= 1890–91 Scottish Cup =

Tournament details
- Country: Scotland

Final positions
- Champions: Heart of Midlothian
- Runners-up: Dumbarton

The 1890–91 Scottish Cup was the 18th season of Scotland's most prestigious football knockout competition. Heart of Midlothian defeated Dumbarton 1–0 to win the trophy.

== Teams ==
Competing teams arranged by district
Dunbartonshire and Stirlingshire		East of Scotland and Fife	Glasgow and Lanarkshire		Renfrewshire, Ayrshire and Buteshire	
Alloa Athletic; Alva; Bridge of Allan; Camelon; Campsie; Campsie Hibernians; Clackmannan; Clydebank; Clydebank Athletic; Dalmuir Thistle; Denny; Dumbarton; Dunipace; East Stirlingshire; Falkirk; Gairdoch; Grangemouth; Grasshoppers	Jamestown; Kilsyth Wanderers; King's Park; Kirkintilloch Athletic; Laurieston; Methlan Park; Milton of Campsie; Old Kilpatrick; Renton; Slamannan; Smithstone Hibs; Southfield Rangers; Stenhousemuir; Tillicoultry; Union; Vale of Bannock; Vale of Leven; Vale of Leven Wanderers	Adventurers; Armadale; Bathgate Rovers; Bellstane Birds; Blairadam; Bo'ness; Bonnyrigg Rose Athletic; Broxburn; Burntisland Thistle; Champfleurie; Cowdenbeath; Dunfermline Athletic; Edinburgh University; Heart of Midlothian; Hibernian; Kirkcaldy Wanderers; Lassodie; Leith Athletic; Linlithgow Athletic; Mossend Swifts; Penicuik Athletic; Raith Rovers; St Bernard's; West Calder	Airdrieonians; Albion Rovers; Battlefield; Burnbank Swifts; Cambuslang; Cambuslang St Bride's; Carfin Shamrock; Carrington; Cartha; Celtic; Clyde; Clydesdale; Cowlairs; Fairfield; Glasgow Hibernian; Glasgow Wanderers; Glengowan; Hamilton Academical; Hamilton Harp; Kelvinside Athletic	Linthouse; Maryhill; Motherwell; Motherwell Shamrock; Northern; Partick Thistle; Queen's Park; Rangers; Royal Albert; Rutherglen; Southern Athletic; Summerton Athletic; Thistle; Uddingston; United Abstainers; Whifflet Shamrock; Whitefield; Wishaw Thistle; 3rd Lanark RV	Abercorn; Annbank; Arthurlie; Ayr; Ayr Athletic; Ayr Parkhouse; Beith; Bute Rangers; Carlton; Cathcart; Dalry; Dykebar; Greenock Abstainers; Hurlford; Irvine; Kilbarchan; Kilbirnie; Kilmarnock	Kilmarnock Athletic; Lanemark; Lochwinnoch; Lugar Boswell; Mauchline; Maybole; Monkcastle; Morton; Neilston; Newmilns; Pollokshaws; Pollokshaws Harp; Port Glasgow Athletic; St Mirren; Saltcoats Victoria; Stevenston Thistle; Stewarton Cunninghame

Competing teams arranged by district
Aberdeenshire	Argyll	Forfarshire	Northern Counties	Perthshire	Southern Counties
Aberdeen; Caledonian; Orion; Victoria United	Inveraray; Lochgilphead; Oban; Oban Rangers	Arbroath; Brechin; Broughty; Dundee East End; Dundee Harp; Dundee Our Boys; Forfar Athletic; Kirriemuir; Lochee; Montrose; Strathmore; Wanderers	Inverness Caledonian; Inverness Thistle; Portland Lybster	Coupar Angus; Crieff; Dunblane; Fair City Athletic; St Johnstone; Vale of Atholl	Annan; Douglas Rovers; Dumfries; Dumfries Wanderers; Mid-Annandale; Moffat; Newton Stewart Athletic; Rising Thistle; Stranraer; 5th Kirkcudbright RV

== First round ==
=== Glasgow and Lanarkshire district ===
Glengowan received a bye to the second round.

Glasgow and Lanarkshire district first round results
Date	Home team	Score	Away team	Venue
6 September 1890	Kelvinside Athletic	1–1	Glasgow Hibernian	Kelburne Street, Glasgow
6 September 1890	Rutherglen	6–0	Cambuslang St Bride's	Lochgair, Rutherglen
6 September 1890	Airdrieonians	3–1	Cowlairs	Mavisbank Park, Airdrie
6 September 1890	Royal Albert	5–4	Motherwell	Raploch Park, Larkhall
6 September 1890	Carrington	1–2	Albion Rovers	Hanover Park, Glasgow
6 September 1890	Uddingston	6–0	Hamilton Harp	Meadowbank, Uddingston
6 September 1890	Motherwell Shamrock	3–7	Fairfield	Ladywell Park, Motherwell
6 September 1890	Northern	5–0 (protested) (Note: A protest by Clydesdale was upheld and a replay was ordered.)	Clydesdale	Hyde Park, Glasgow
6 September 1890	Clyde	7–2	Whitefield	Barrowfield Park, Glasgow
6 September 1890	Celtic	1–0	Rangers	Celtic Park, Glasgow
6 September 1890	Battlefield	1–4	3rd Lanark RV	Mossfield Park, Langside
6 September 1890	Burnbank Swifts	13–0	United Abstainers	Victoria Park, Hamilton
6 September 1890	Thistle	3–5	Queen's Park	Beechwood Park, Glasgow
6 September 1890	Hamilton Academical	0–8	Linthouse	Douglas Park, Hamilton
6 September 1890	Maryhill	4–1	Southern Athletic	Kelvindale Park, Maryhill
6 September 1890	Cambuslang	3–1	Glasgow Wanderers	Whitefield Park, Cambuslang
6 September 1890	Wishaw Thistle	3–2	Partick Thistle	Recreation Park, Wishaw
	Cartha	w/o (Note: Cartha scratched and Carfin Shamrock advanced to the second round.)	Carfin Shamrock	
	Whifflet Shamrock	w/o (Note: Whifflet Shamrock scratched and Summerton Athletic advanced to the second round.)	Summerton Athletic	

Glasgow and Lanarkshire district first round replays
Date	Home team	Score	Away team	Venue
13 September 1890	Glasgow Hibernian	5–1	Kelvinside Athletic	Hibernian Park, Glasgow
20 September 1890	Northern	7–1	Clydesdale	Hyde Park, Glasgow

=== Renfrewshire, Ayrshire and Buteshire district ===
Beith received a bye to the second round.

Renfrewshire, Ayrshire and Buteshire district first round results
Date	Home team	Score	Away team	Venue
6 September 1890	Morton	7–2	Ayr Athletic	Cappielow, Greenock
6 September 1890	Neilston	7–3	Bute Rangers	Nether Kirton Park, Neilston
6 September 1890	Stevenston Thistle	9–2	Stewarton Cunninghame	Warner Park, Stevenston
6 September 1890	Kilmarnock	4–4	Annbank	Rugby Park, Kilmarnock
6 September 1890	Maybole	3–4	Hurlford	Gardenrose Farm, Maybole
6 September 1890	Saltcoats Victoria	4–3	Lochwinnoch	Brewery Park, Saltcoats
6 September 1890	Cathcart	5–3	Pollokshaws Harp	Eglinton Park, Cathcart
6 September 1890	Dalry	5–2	Pollokshaws	Blairland Park, Dalry
6 September 1890	Mauchline	1–3	Kilmarnock Athletic	Connel Park, Mauchline
6 September 1890	Arthurlie	2–5	St Mirren	Dunterlie Park, Barrhead
6 September 1890	Ayr Parkhouse	6–1	Kilbirnie	Beresford Park, Ayr
6 September 1890	Greenock Abstainers	0–13	Newmilns	Ladyburn, Greenock
6 September 1890	Port Glasgow Athletic	0–2	Monkcastle	Clune Park, Port Glasgow
6 September 1890	Abercorn	8–0	Irvine	Underwood Park, Paisley
	Carlton	w/o (Note: Lugar Boswell scratched and Carlton advanced to the second round.)	Lugar Boswell	
	Lanemark	w/o (Note: Dykebar scratched and Lanemark advanced to the second round.)	Dykebar	
	Ayr	w/o (Note: Kilbarchan scratched and Ayr advanced to the second round.)	Kilbarchan	

Renfrewshire, Ayrshire and Buteshire district first round replay
Date	Home team	Score	Away team	Venue
13 September 1890	Annbank	6–2	Kilmarnock	Pebble Park, Annbank

=== Dunbartonshire and Stirlingshire district ===
Dunbartonshire and Stirlingshire district first round results
Date	Home team	Score	Away team	Venue
6 September 1890	Denny	0–4	Alva	Hill Park, Denny
6 September 1890	Campsie	4–1	Laurieston	Alum Works Park, Lennoxtown
6 September 1890	Slamannan	6–2	Gairdoch	Castleburn Park, Slamannan
6 September 1890	Dumbarton	8–2	Smithston Hibs	Boghead Park, Dumbarton
6 September 1890	Kirkintilloch Athletic	2–2	Clydebank	Townhead Park, Kirkintilloch
6 September 1890	Old Kilpatrick	1–6	Jamestown	High Lusset Park, Old Kilpatrick
6 September 1890	Clackmannan	9–0	Milton of Campsie	Chapelhill Park, Clackmannan
6 September 1890	Campsie Hibernians	3–6	Clydebank Athletic	Alum Rock Park, Lennoxtown
6 September 1890	Tillicoultry	1–6	Dalmuir Thistle	Ochilview Park, Tillicoultry
6 September 1890	Camelon	4–3	Alloa Athletic	Victoria Park, Camelon
6 September 1890	Kilsyth Wanderers	2–1	Renton	Garrel Garden, Kilsyth
6 September 1890	Union	12–1	Grasshoppers	St James' Park, Dumbarton
6 September 1890	Methlan Park	1–0	King's Park	Upper Woodyard Park, Dumbarton
6 September 1890	Bridge of Allan	7–2	Southfield Rangers	Coneyhill Park, Bridge of Allan
6 September 1890	East Stirlingshire	8–2	Grangemouth	Merchiston Park, Bainsford
	Dunipace	w/o (Note: Dunipace scratched and Vale of Leven Wanderers advanced to the second round.)	Vale of Leven Wanderers	
	Stenhousemuir	w/o (Note: Stenhousemuir scratched and Vale of Leven advanced to the second round.)	Vale of Leven	
	Vale of Bannock	w/o (Note: Vale of Bannock scratched and Falkirk advanced to the second round.)	Falkirk	

Dunbartonshire and Stirlingshire district first round replay
Date	Home team	Score	Away team	Venue
13 September 1890	Clydebank	4–3	Kirkintilloch Athletic	Hamilton Park, Clydebank

=== East of Scotland and Fife district ===
Bellstane Birds received a bye to the second round and Edinburgh University received a bye to the third round.

East of Scotland and Fife district first round results
Date	Home team	Score	Away team	Venue
6 September 1890	Bathgate Rovers	3–2	Dunfermline Athletic	Boghead Park, Bathgate
6 September 1890	Kirkcaldy Wanderers	3–4	Hibernian	Newtown Park, Kirkcaldy
6 September 1890	Heart of Midlothian	7–2	Raith Rovers	Tynecastle Park, Edinburgh
6 September 1890	Burntisland Thistle	4–2	Bonnyrigg Rose Athletic	Lammerlaws Park, Burntisland
6 September 1890	Cowdenbeath	10–1	Linlithgow Athletic	North End Park, Cowdenbeath
6 September 1890	St Bernard's	7–0 (void) (Note: St Bernard's were disqualified and Adventurers advanced to the second round.)	Adventurers	Powderhall, Edinburgh
6 September 1890	Leith Athletic	3–2	Armadale	Bank Park, Leith
6 September 1890	Penicuik Athletic	5–3	Champfleurie	Kirkhill Park, Penicuik
	Mossend Swifts	w/o (Note: Lassodie scratched and Mossend Swifts advanced to the second round.)	Lassodie	
	Bo'ness	w/o (Note: Blairadam scratched and Bo'ness advanced to the second round.)	Blairadam	
	Broxburn	w/o (Note: West Calder scratched and Broxburn advanced to the second round.)	West Calder	

=== Forfarshire district ===
Forfarshire district first round results
Date	Home team	Score	Away team	Venue
6 September 1890	Forfar Athletic	2–7	Dundee Our Boys	Station Park, Forfar
6 September 1890	Wanderers	3–3	Arbroath	Morgan Park, Dundee
6 September 1890	Montrose	7–1	Broughty	Links Park, Montrose
6 September 1890	Brechin	3–4	Kirriemuir	Montrose Street Park, Brechin
	Dundee Harp	w/o (Note: Lochee scratched and Dundee Harp advanced to the second round.)	Lochee	
	Strathmore	w/o (Note: Strathmore scratched and Dundee East End advanced to the second round.)	Dundee East End	

Forfarshire district first round replay
Date	Home team	Score	Away team	Venue
13 September 1890	Arbroath	4–1	Wanderers	Gayfield Park, Arbroath

=== Perthshire district ===
Perthshire district first round results
Date	Home team	Score	Away team	Venue
6 September 1890	St Johnstone	2–2 (abandoned) (Note: Abandoned following a dispute over St Johnstone's second goal. Coupar Angus were subsequently disqualified and St Johnstone advanced to the second round.)	Coupar Angus	Recreation Grounds, Perth
6 September 1890	Fair City Athletic	7–3	Dunblane	Balhousie Park, Perth
	Crieff	w/o (Note: Vale of Atholl scratched and Crieff advanced to the second round.)	Vale of Atholl	

=== Aberdeenshire district ===
Aberdeenshire district first round results
Date	Home team	Score	Away team	Venue
6 September 1890	Caledonian	2–1	Victoria United	Holburn Grounds, Aberdeen
6 September 1890	Orion	1–5	Aberdeen	Central Park, Aberdeen

=== Northern Counties ===
Portland Lybster received a bye to the second round.

Northern Counties first round results
Date	Home team	Score	Away team	Venue
6 September 1890	Inverness Thistle	2–4	Inverness Caledonian	Kingsmills Park, Inverness

=== Southern Counties ===
Southern Counties first round results
Date	Home team	Score	Away team	Venue
6 September 1890	Annan	2–8	Dumfries Wanderers	Greenknowe, Annan
6 September 1890	Mid-Annandale	16–1	Rising Thistle	Livingstone Place Park, Lockerbie
6 September 1890	Douglas Rovers	0–5	5th Kirkcudbright RV	Balmoral Park, Castle Douglas
6 September 1890	Dumfries	9–0	Newton Stewart	Recreation Grounds, Dumfries
	Stranraer	w/o (Note: Moffat scratched and Stranraer advanced to the second round.)	Moffat	

=== Argyll district ===
Argyll district first round results
Date	Home team	Score	Away team	Venue
6 September 1890	Inveraray	4–1	Lochgilphead	Winterton, Inveraray
6 September 1890	Oban	3–0	Oban Rangers	Dalintart Park, Oban

== Second round ==
=== East of Scotland, Fife, Dunbartonshire and Stirlingshire district ===
East of Scotland, Fife, Dunbartonshire and Stirlingshire district second round results
Date	Home team	Score	Away team	Venue
27 September 1890	Broxburn	5–3	Clackmannan	Albion Park, Broxburn
27 September 1890	Camelon	2–1	Alva	Victoria Park, Camelon
27 September 1890	Bridge of Allan	1–5	Vale of Leven	Coneyhill Park, Bridge of Allan
27 September 1890	Clydebank Athletic	3–5	Kilsyth Wanderers	Whitecrook Park, Clydebank
27 September 1890	Dalmuir Thistle	5–7	Cowdenbeath	Castle Park, Dalmuir
27 September 1890	Campsie	4–4	East Stirlingshire	Alum Works Park, Lennoxtown
27 September 1890	Jamestown	2–5	Mossend Swifts	Balloch Road, Jamestown
27 September 1890	Slamannan	5–2 (protested) (Note: A protest by Clydebank was upheld and a replay was ordered.)	Clydebank	Castleburn Park, Slamannan
27 September 1890	Hibernian	1–9	Dumbarton	Hibernian Park, Edinburgh
27 September 1890	Leith Athletic	7–2	Falkirk	Bank Park, Leith
27 September 1890	Penicuick Athletic	3–4	Methlan Park	Kirkhill Park, Penicuik
27 September 1890	Bathgate Rovers	6–2	Union	Boghead Park, Bathgate
11 October 1890	Bo'ness	7–0	Bellstane Birds	Newtown Park, Bo'ness
	Heart of Midlothian	w/o (Note: Burntisland Thistle scratched and Heart of Midlothian advanced to the third round.)	Burntisland Thistle	
	Adventurers	w/o (Note: Vale of Leven Wanderers were disqualified and Adventurers advanced to the third round.)	Vale of Leven Wanderers	

East of Scotland, Fife, Dunbartonshire and Stirlingshire district second round replays
Date	Home team	Score	Away team	Venue
4 October 1890	East Stirlingshire	3–1	Campsie	Merchiston Park, Bainsford
11 October 1890	Clydebank	5–2	Slamannan	Hamilton Park, Clydebank

=== Glasgow, Lanarkshire, Renfrewshire and Ayrshire ===
Glasgow, Lanarkshire, Renfrewshire and Ayrshire district second round results
Date	Home team	Score	Away team	Venue
27 September 1890	Beith	2–4	Cambuslang	Knockbuckle, Beith
27 September 1890	Celtic	2–2	Carfin Shamrock	Celtic Park, Glasgow
27 September 1890	Fairfield	2–5	Royal Albert	Argyle Park, Govan
27 September 1890	St Mirren	5–1	Albion Rovers	Westmarch, Paisley
27 September 1890	Queen's Park	5–1	Northern	Hampden Park, Crosshill
27 September 1890	Newmilns	2–2	Uddingston	West End Park, Newmilns
27 September 1890	Burnbank Swifts	2–1 (protested) (Note: A protest by Stevenston Thistle was upheld and a replay was ordered.)	Stevenston Thistle	Victoria Park, Hamilton
27 September 1890	Linthouse	7–2	Maryhill	Langlands Park, Govan
27 September 1890	Morton	3–2	Neilston	Cappielow, Greenock
27 September 1890	Clyde	4–3	Hurlford	Barrowfield Park, Glasgow
27 September 1890	Rutherglen	1–3	Ayr	Lochgair, Rutherglen
27 September 1890	Wishaw Thistle	4–1	Glasgow Hibernian	Recreation Park, Wishaw
27 September 1890	Saltcoats Victoria	3–2	Lanemark	Brewery Park, Saltcoats
27 September 1890	3rd Lanark RV	8–1	Kilmarnock Athletic	Cathkin Park, Crosshill
27 September 1890	Ayr Parkhouse	1–2	Summerton Athletic	Beresford Park, Ayr
27 September 1890	Monkcastle	4–2	Dalry	Claremont Park, Kilwinning
27 September 1890	Airdrieonians	3–1	Annbank	Mavisbank Park, Airdrie
27 September 1890	Abercorn	12–0	Cathcart	Underwood Park, Paisley
	Carlton	w/o (Note: Carlton scratched and Glengowan advanced to the third round.)	Glengowan	

Glasgow, Lanarkshire, Renfrewshire and Ayrshire district second round replays
Date	Home team	Score	Away team	Venue
4 October 1890	Carfin Shamrock	1–3	Celtic	Byres Knowe Park, Carfin
4 October 1890	Uddingston	5–1	Newmilns	Meadowbank, Uddingston
11 October 1890	Burnbank Swifts	3–0	Stevenston Thistle	Victoria Park, Hamilton

=== Forfarshire and Perthshire district ===
Dundee Our Boys received a bye to the third round.

Forfarshire and Perthshire district second round results
Date	Home team	Score	Away team	Venue
27 September 1890	Crieff	0–11	Fair City Athletic	Burnside Park, Crieff
27 September 1890	Kirriemuir	0–3	Montrose	Newton Park, Kirriemuir
27 September 1890	Dundee East End	4–2	St Johnstone	Clepington Park, Dundee
27 September 1890	Dundee Harp	1–5	Arbroath	East Dock Street, Dundee

=== Aberdeenshire district ===
Aberdeenshire district second round results
Date	Home team	Score	Away team	Venue
27 September 1890	Aberdeen	8–0	Caledonian	Chanonry Grounds, Aberdeen

=== Northern Counties ===
Northern Counties second round results
Date	Home team	Score	Away team	Venue
	Inverness Caledonian	w/o (Note: Portland Lybster scratched and Inverness Caledonian advanced to the third round.)	Portland Lybster	

=== Southern Counties ===
Stranraer received a bye to the third round.

Southern Counties second round results
Date	Home team	Score	Away team	Venue
27 September 1890	5th Kirkcudbright RV	9–1 (abandoned) (Note: Match abandoned after Mid-Annandale walked off in protest. The result was allowed to stand.)	Mid-Annandale	Palmerston Park, Dumfries
27 September 1890	Dumfries Wanderers	6–5	Dumfries	Cresswell Park, Dumfries

=== Argyll district ===
Argyll district second round results
Date	Home team	Score	Away team	Venue
27 September 1890	Inverary	4–2	Oban	Winterton, Inveraray

== Third round ==
=== Glasgow, Lanarkshire, Ayrshire, Renfrewshire and Argyll district ===
Glasgow, Lanarkshire, Ayrshire, Renfrewshire and Argyll district third round results
Date	Home team	Score	Away team	Venue
18 October 1890	Airdrieonians	8–0	Glengowan	Mavisbank Park, Airdrie
18 October 1890	Linthouse	3–4	Abercorn	Langlands Park, Govan
18 October 1890	Monkcastle	1–7	Burnbank Swifts	Claremont Park, Kilwinning
18 October 1890	Queen's Park	6–0	Uddingston	Hampden Park, Crosshill
18 October 1890	3rd Lanark RV	8–1	Summerton Athletic	Cathkin Park, Crosshill
18 October 1890	Morton	10–0	Inveraray	Cappielow, Greenock
18 October 1890	Royal Albert	6–2	Saltcoats Victoria	Raploch Park, Larkhall
18 October 1890	Wishaw Thistle	2–6	Celtic	Recreation Park, Wishaw
18 October 1890	Cambuslang	1–2	St Mirren	Whitefield Park, Cambuslang
18 October 1890	Clyde	3–4	Ayr	Barrowfield Park, Glasgow

=== East of Scotland, Stirlingshire, Dunbartonshire and Fife district ===
East of Scotland, Stirlingshire, Dunbartonshire and Fife district third round results
Date	Home team	Score	Away team	Venue
18 October 1890	Edinburgh University	3–2	Cowdenbeath	Craiglockart, Edinburgh
18 October 1890	Dumbarton	6–0	Clydebank	Boghead Park, Dumbarton
18 October 1890	Kilsyth Wanderers	1–8	Vale of Leven	Garrel Garden, Kilsyth
18 October 1890	Heart of Midlothian	3–0	Methlan Park	Meggatland, Edinburgh (Note: Match played at Meggatland instead of Tynecastle Park, Heart of Midlothian's registered home ground, to coincide with the Edinburgh International Exhibition.)
18 October 1890	Leith Athletic	12–0	Adventurers	Bank Park, Leith
18 October 1890	Bathgate Rovers	6–0	Broxburn	Boghead Park, Bathgate
18 October 1890	East Stirlingshire	3–3	Camelon	Merchiston Park, Bainsford
18 October 1890	Bo'ness	1–1	Mossend Swifts	Newtown Park, Bo'ness

East of Scotland, Stirlingshire, Dunbartonshire and Fife district third round replays
Date	Home team	Score	Away team	Venue
25 October 1890	Camelon	6–10	East Stirlingshire	Victoria Park, Camelon
25 October 1890	Mossend Swifts	9–1	Bo'ness	Mossend Park, West Calder

=== Forfarshire and Perthshire district ===
Arbroath received a bye to the fourth round.

Forfarshire and Perthshire district third round results
Date	Home team	Score	Away team	Venue
18 October 1890	Dundee Our Boys	4–0	Dundee East End	West Craigie Park, Dundee
18 October 1890	Montrose	4–1	Fair City Athletic	Links Park, Montrose

=== Northern Counties ===
Northern Counties third round results
Date	Home team	Score	Away team	Venue
18 October 1890	Inverness Caledonian	6–2	Aberdeen	Caledonian Park, Inverness

=== Southern Counties ===
5th Kirkcudbright RV received a bye to the fourth round.

Southern Counties third round results
Date	Home team	Score	Away team	Venue
	Dumfries Wanderers	w/o (Note: Stranraer scratched and Dumfries Wanderers advanced to the fourth round.)	Stranraer	

== Fourth round ==
Fourth round results
Date	Home team	Score	Away team	Venue
8 November 1890	Edinburgh University	0–7	Queen's Park	Tynecastle Park, Edinburgh
8 November 1890	5th Kirkcudbright RV	6–2	Arbroath	Palmerston Park, Dumfries
8 November 1890	Montrose	0–3	3rd Lanark RV	Links Park, Montrose
8 November 1890	Dundee Our Boys	1–3	Celtic	West Craigie Park, Dundee
8 November 1890	Ayr	3–4	Heart of Midlothian	Somerset Park, Ayr
8 November 1890	Airdrieonians	1–2	St Mirren	Mavisbank Park, Airdrie
8 November 1890	Abercorn	8–0	Bathgate Rovers	Underwood Park, Paisley
8 November 1890	Dumbarton	7–3	Mossend Swifts	Boghead Park, Dumbarton
8 November 1890	Morton	6–4	Dumfries Wanderers	Cappielow, Greenock
8 November 1890	Royal Albert	1–0	Burnbank Swifts	Raploch Park, Larkhall
8 November 1890	Leith Athletic	3–1	Vale of Leven	Bank Park, Leith
8 November 1890	East Stirlingshire	2–0	Inverness Caledonian	Merchiston Park, Bainsford

== Fifth round ==
Abercorn, East Stirlingshire, Leith Athletic and 3rd Lanark RV received a bye to the quarter-finals.

Fifth round results
Date	Home team	Score	Away team	Venue
29 November 1890	Heart of Midlothian	5–1	Morton	Tynecastle Park, Edinburgh
29 November 1890	Celtic	2–2	Royal Albert	Celtic Park, Glasgow
6 December 1890	Dumbarton	8–0	5th Kirkcudbright RV	Boghead Park, Dumbarton
6 December 1890	St Mirren	2–3	Queen's Park	Westmarch, Paisley

Fifth round replay
Date	Home team	Score	Away team	Venue
6 December 1890	Royal Albert	0–4 (abandoned) (Note: The Royal Albert vs Celtic match was abandoned due to crowd trouble and a replay was ordered.)	Celtic	Raploch Park, Larkhall

Fifth round second replay
Date	Home team	Score	Away team	Venue
13 December 1890	Celtic	2–0	Royal Albert	Ibrox Park, Govan (Note: Played at a neutral venue.)

== Quarter-final ==
Quarter-final results
Date	Home team	Score	Away team	Venue
20 December 1890	Leith Athletic	2–3	Abercorn	Bank Park, Leith
20 December 1890	Dumbarton	3–0	Celtic	Boghead Park, Dumbarton
20 December 1890	East Stirlingshire	1–3	Heart of Midlothian	Merchiston Park, Bainsford
10 January 1891	3rd Lanark RV	1–1	Queen's Park	Cathkin Park, Crosshill

Quarter-final replay
Date	Home team	Score	Away team	Venue
17 January 1891	Queen's Park	2–2	3rd Lanark RV	Hampden Park, Crosshill

Quarter-final second replay
Date	Home team	Score	Away team	Venue
24 January 1891	Queen's Park	1–4	3rd Lanark RV	Hampden Park, Crosshill

== Semi-finals ==
Semi-final results
Date	Home team	Score	Away team	Venue
17 January 1891	Dumbarton	3–1	Abercorn	Boghead Park, Dumbarton
31 January 1891	3rd Lanark RV	1–4	Heart of Midlothian	Cathkin Park, Crosshill

== Final ==
7 February 1891

Heart of Midlothian	1–0	Dumbarton

Hampden Park

== See also ==
- 1890–91 in Scottish football
