= Denny F.C. =

Association football club in Dunbartonshire, Scotland

Denny
- Full name: Denny F.C.
- Nickname: the Dennites
- Founded: 1889
- Dissolved: 1894
- Ground: Hill Park
- Hon. Presidents: Ex-Provost Shanks and John Luke J.P.
- Match Secretary: John Ramsay, William Smellie, James Henderson
- Hon. Secretary: John B. Shirra, W. J. H. Ritchie
Home colours

Denny F.C. was a football club from Denny, Stirlingshire.

== History ==
=== Denny ===
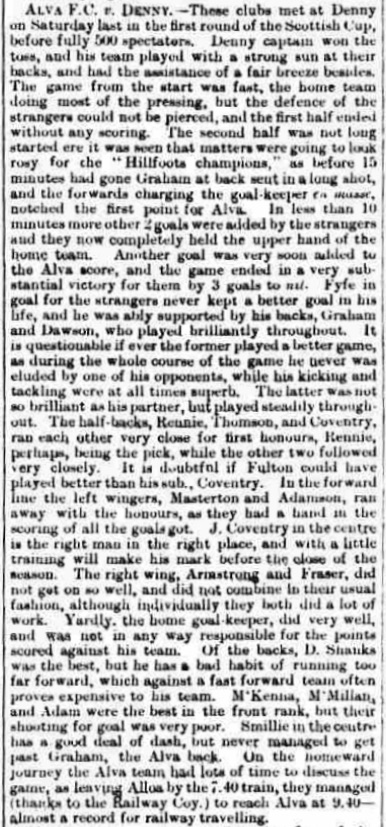
1890–91 Scottish Cup 1st Round, Denny 0–4 Alva, Alloa Advertiser, 13 September 1890

The club was formed at a meeting at the Good Templar hall in Denny on 14 January 1889, with Mr David Shanks of Beechfield appointed as president. The club's formation sparked a debate at the Falkirk Literary Society in February as to whether the club could be a success; its first match, in March, against Stirlingshire Cup semi-finalists Kilsyth Wanderers, ended in defeat, but only by 4–3, Denny having had a two-goal lead at half-time.

Denny had close links with Dunipace, its closest senior member; in 1890–91, the Dunipace match secretary William Smellie took on the duties for both clubs, before in 1891–92 solely devoting himself to Denny. However, there was comment that the town was too small to support two clubs, with Dunipace nearly going under in 1890, and even at that date there was local media encouragement for the clubs to merge.

The club was formed too late to enter the main competitions in 1888–89, but it did take part in the Stirlingshire Charity Cup, although its first match was a 3–2 defeat to the Vale of Bannock. Despite local curiosity as to seeing a side which had not previously played in Stirling, the crowd only paid a gate of £5.

Denny was admitted as a member of the Scottish Football Association in August 1889. It therefore entered the 1889–90 Scottish Cup, as well as the Stirlingshire Cup for the first round. In the national competition, the club lost 5–1 at Alloa Athletic, despite the home side's performance being described as "listless"; Denny earned its first competitive win in the county cup a month later, beating Barnsmuir 8–0, 7 of the goals coming in the second half, and 4 in the last fifteen minutes. In the second round Denny lost 6–1 at Gairdoch, Denny having scored an equalizer on the hour, but going behind again almost from the kick-off and never recovering. The club gained some consolation with its biggest competitive win in the Charity Cup, 13–1 over Stirling Garrison, but lost in the semi-final 6–0 against King's Park at Bridge of Allan; the match attracted the biggest crowd of the competition, and the game turned in the five minutes before half-time, in which King's Park scored its first three goals. The defeat was the club's last appearance in the charity competition.

The club got a home draw in the 1890–91 Scottish Cup against Alva; the crowd of 500 was Denny's highest recorded, but the majority left disappointed as the Clackmannanshire side won 4–0. Again the Stirlingshire Cup provided some consolation, with a 7–1 win over Grasshoppers thanks to a "rattling" performance after going behind inside a minute, and a narrow 1–0 quarter-final defeat to Grangemouth, in which Denny again conceded early, and dominated the game, but could not force an equalizer. However the club would never win in the competition again.

Denny won a Scottish Cup tie for the first time in 1891–92, 4–2 at Laurieston, the result considered one of the surprises of the round and credited to the back play of Shanks; however this was merely the first qualifying round, as from this season the Scottish FA had introduced a preliminary stage. Denny won through to the fourth and final preliminary stage, but lost 10–0 at a strong Arbroath side. This time Shanks "had lost interest in the game early in the second half", by which time Denny was 4 down.

The 1893–94 season was the club's last, the rising tide of professionalism and the various leagues was killing off smaller clubs over the countryside, and Denny was one of several Stirlingshire clubs to go bust at this time. Denny was one of seven clubs to form the Stirlingshire League that season, but it was never quite finished, Denny being joint second when the season was wound up, and the league did not continue.

The signs were ominous at the start of the season; although the club played above itself to gain an unlikely draw at home to the Vale of Leven in the first preliminary round of the Scottish Cup, each side scoring 3 times when playing with the wind, the club had to scratch from the replay. The gulf to the more professional clubs was shown in the first round of the Stirlingshire, Denny losing 8–2 to King's Park; the original tie had to be turned into a friendly after the referee failed to turn up, and the Dennites' apology for accusing the referee Mr French (of Third Lanark) of incompetence during the official tie was so insufficient that Mr French complained to the Scottish FA, Denny's explanation that it had been misinterpreted not being accepted.

The club's formal end came when it was struck from the Scottish FA roll in August 1894.

=== Denny Athletic ===
Denny Athletic
- Full name: Denny Athletic F.C.
- Founded: 1895
- Dissolved: 1915
- Ground: Hill Park
- Match Secretary: James Henderson, James Murray
Home colours

In August 1895, the club re-formed itself as Denny Athletic, at the same ground and Mr Henderson reprising his role as club secretary, and applied successfully to join the Scottish Football Association as a new member.

At the same time the club set up a Junior club, Denny Athletic Juniors, which also operated out of Hill Park, and, at junior level, had more success than the senior club, constantly turning a profit.

The revived senior club had a similar lack of success to its predecessor. It never won a tie in the Stirlingshire Cup; its only success in the competition came in the first round of the new Consolation Cup in 1896–97, beating Grasshoppers 8–6 on aggregate, the second tie being marred when Robert Burns of Grasshoppers and Lawrence M'Laren of Athletic were ordered off for fighting. It also only won one Scottish Qualifying Cup tie in its entries - its first tie, against Rumford Rovers in 1895–96. At the end of its first season, Denny Athletic applied to join the Midland League, but only gained 2 votes, five short of the minimum required.

At the end of the 1898–99 season, Denny announced that it was resigning from the Scottish Football Association, thus ending its tenure as a senior club. Embarrassingly, the Stirlingshire FA President at the time, a Mr Lindsay, was there as representative of Denny, but the Dunipace agreed that he could represent the "other" Denny club instead, so retain his seat. The Junior club continued until 1915, when the expense of running a team during the First World War proved too much.

== Colours ==
The club wore dark blue jerseys and white knickers. On its revival, it adopted "light" blue jerseys, described after one season as simply blue.

== Ground ==
The club originally played at Lea Park in Denny. In 1890 it moved to Hill Park, the first game at the new ground on 18 January being a 5–3 friendly win over Gairdoch.

== Notable players ==
- John Ramsay, formerly of Morton, was the club's first captain.
- Willie Loney, played for Denny Athletic from 1898 until signing for Celtic in August 1900
