= Campsie Hibernians F.C. =

Former association football club in Scotland

Campsie Hibernians
- Nickname: the Hibs
- Founded: 1889
- Dissolved: 1891
- Ground: Brechin's Farm
- Hon. Secretary: H. Murray
- Match Secretary: Daniel Gallacher
Home colours

Campsie Hibernians Football Club was a Scottish association football club based in the village of Lennoxtown, Stirlingshire.

== History ==
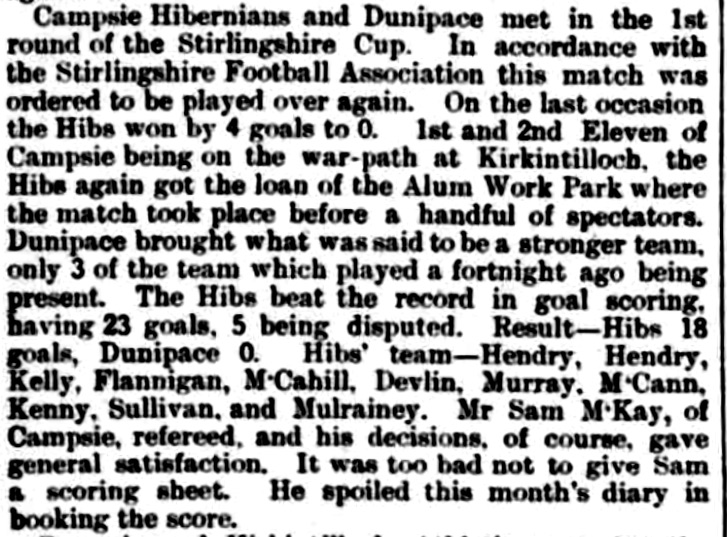
1890–91 Stirlingshire Cup 1st Round, Campsie Hibernians 18–0 Dunipace, Kirkintilloch Herald, 19 November 1890

The club was founded in 1889, only managing a couple of practice games before its first match proper, against Stenhousemuir in the Stirlingshire Cup in October that year; the club went down to double figures, losing a couple of players to injury. At the end of the season, the club played in a four-team tournament for bades presented by one Peter Sloan, wanting to "revive the flagging interest in Campsie football"; in the first tie, the Hibs met Campsie for the first - and only - time in competitive football. Only 250 saw the match, which Campsie won 6–0.

Undaunted, the club joined the Scottish Football Association the following August, and entered the 1890–91 Scottish Cup. However the club went down 6–3 at "home" (the tie being played at Alum Rock Park) to Clydebank Athletic.

It had better fortune in the Stirlingshire. The club seemed to have beaten Dunipace by a healthy 4–0, but, as darkness had ended the tie with 15 minutes to go, the Stirlingshire FA ordered the tie to be replayed. Dunipace made 8 changes, supposedly to make its side stronger, but the Hibs ran riot, scoring 18 goals, and another 5 being disputed. The Hibs were given a bye into the quarter-final, but lost 6–1 against Laurieston, the match being plagued by "a gang of young ruffians who attend football matches for the purpose of causing disturbances".

Even after the club's first match there was some doubt whether Lennoxtown could support two clubs, and, with the Hibs - despite a promising season - eing behind the other Lennoxtown side, the club was dissolved in 1891, leaving the Scottish FA in August and the Stirlingshire in October. The final match definitively played by the club was at the Smithstone Hibernians in April 1891, ending in a 1–0 defeat. There is one record for a Campsie Hibs in October 1893 but, if this is not a misprint, it must refer to a different side.

== Colours ==
The club wore green jerseys with blue knickers.

== Ground ==
The club normally played home matches at Brechin's Farm. For its home cup ties in 1890, the club was able to use Campsie's Alum Rock Park.

== Notable players ==
- James Quigley, of Hibernian, played for the club in 1890.
