= Smithstone Hibs F.C. =

Former association football club in Scotland

Smithstone Hibs
- Full name: Smithstone Hibs F.C.
- Nickname: the Hibs
- Founded: 1889
- Dissolved: 1897
- Ground: Haugh Park
- Hon. Secretary: James Stone, James Doherty
- Match Secretary: James Culley
Home colours

Smithstone Hibs F.C. was a football club from Kilsyth in Scotland.

== History ==
=== Smithstone Hibs ===
The club was sometimes known as Smithstone Hibernian, but the name as officially given was the short form Smithstone Hibs. The town name was also sometimes rendered as Smithston. The first recorded matches for the club came in the Kilsyth Charity Cup in 1889.

In the competition, the Hibs beat Denny 1–0 in a replay in the quarter-final, but the tie had repercussions for the club. The Hibs refused to pay Denny its share of the gate money, and, although the Hibs joined the Scottish Football Association in August 1889, it was expelled within a month for not paying over the amount outstanding to Denny. Only after Hibs officials attended the Denny v Grasshoppers match on 19 October to hand over the cash was the club re-instated.

The Hibs had already been knocked out of the 1889–90 Scottish Cup, losing 5–0 at Duntocher Harp, and the ban prevented the club from entering any of the county cups - curiously, although the other clubs in Kilsyth pledged themselves to the Stirlingshire Association, Smithstone looked to Dunbartonshire.

Nevertheless, the club finished the 1889–90 season on a high note, as it won the Kilsyth Charity Cup, beating Kilsyth Wanderers in the final, and the players earned themselves gold badges.

The club entered the 1890–91 Scottish Cup, and was drawn at home to Dumbarton in the first round, but the club's new Haugh Park ground was not yet ready, so the club had to play at Boghead; despite coming from 3–0 to 3–2 down in the first half, Dumbarton wound up 8–2 winners.

Perhaps because of this lack of ground, the club did not enter the Dunbartonshire Cup. The club did enter the county competition in 1891–92, and survived a protest from Clydebank after beating the Bankies on the ground of Smithstone Emmett - whom the Hibs claimed was their third XI, so therefore on a ground which qualified as "private" - who complained about the Hibs being late and the pitch being obscured by smoke from a passing steam train; the referee's evidence as to the late team being the Clydebank saw the protest routinely dismissed.

The club reached the semi-final of the competition both in that season and in 1892–93, narrowly losing to Vale of Leven - experimenting with three new players - in the former year, and 4–2 against Levendale in the latter, the club finishing the match with 10 men after one of the backs was ordered off while the scores were level.

The club had also entered the Scottish Cup in both seasons, but the Scottish FA had introduced qualifying rounds from 1891 to 1892, and the Hibs fell just short of making the first round proper in each season. In 1891–92 the club at least had the consolation of its biggest competitive win, 11–1 over Linlithgow Athletic in the second round, and in 1892–93 the club was unlucky to lose 2–1 at home to King's Park in the third.

The club's final match under the name appears to have been the 1892–93 Kilsyth Charity Cup final against Campsie, which the Hibs won 3–2, thus retaining the trophy which it had won the previous season by beating Kilsyth Standard 4–1.

=== Kilsyth Hibs ===
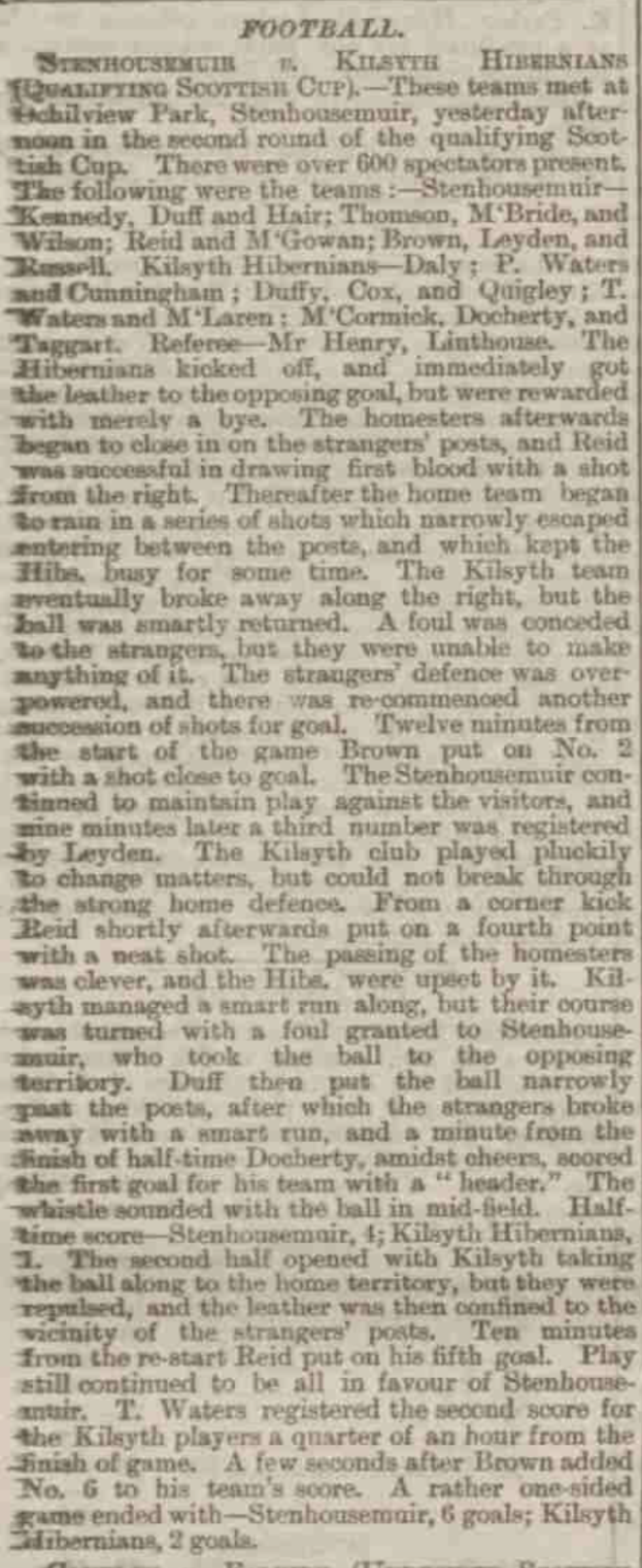
The club's last competitive match, a defeat to Stenhousemuir in the 1896–97 Scottish Qualifying Cup 2nd Round, Falkirk Herald, 9 September 1896

In 1893, the club was effectively re-founded as Kilsyth Hibs, still using the shortened name, playing at the same ground and with James Doherty remaining as club secretary. One of the club's final matches as Smithstone was a 3–0 win at Kilsyth Wanderers, which may have prompted the name change.

Also with the change was a change in county membership as Kilsyth Hibs switched to the Stirlingshire FA, approved as members unanimously, so from 1893 to 1894 entered the Stirlingshire Cup, which had far more competitors than the Dunbartonshire by this stage; however the club never won a tie in the competition. The move also had an unexpected consequence as the Hibs found that 9 of its first XI lived a few yards inside Dunbartonshire, rather than Stirlingshire, which resulted in a second XI losing to Grangemouth in its first entry. For the following season it got special dispensation to be able to field them in county competition.

The club had tried to join the Midland League in 1893, to no avail, and was involved in trying to set up an alternative league with other overlooked clubs, but it was decided to run with 7 clubs alone, and Kilsyth Hibs were left on the outside.

An attempt to gain election to the Midland League in 1896 was also unsuccessful, the club receiving votes from 4 of the other members, when 7 votes were required. The attempt was the club's last throw of the dice; after losing 6–2 at Stenhousemuir in the second round of the 1896–97 Scottish Qualifying Cup, the club scratched from the Stirlingshire Cup, and the club had "collapsed" before the 1897–98 season.

The Smithstone Hibs name was revived in the early 20th century for a Junior club.

=== Reputation ===
The club had a reputation for somewhat brutal approach. Complaints about its robust approach to tactics came from King's Park ("a game in which there was little football"), Broxburn Shamrock ("there was more of the lion than the lamb about [Hibs]...the play was very forcible all through"), Campsie ("more resembling a bullfight than a football match"), and Alloa Athletic ("the Hibs are a burly set of fellows, and are not particular whether they take the man or the ball"). One match with Kilsyth Wanderers was stopped by the referee because "all the players wanted to fight one another" and the Hibs' Paddy Walters had the reputation of being one of the most suspended players.

== Colours ==
The clubs colours were green and white shirts and black knickers.

== Ground ==
The only known ground for the club is Haugh Park, to which it moved in October 1890.

== Notable players ==
- Paddy Trodden, who played one game for Celtic after leaving the club, and also played for Kilmarnock
- Alex Drain, who represented the Dunbartonshire FA and Stirlingshire FA, when a Hibs player between 1892 and 1895, who occasionally turned out for Celtic in friendly matches, and who died of injuries from a broken spine after a mining accident in 1897
