= Southfield Rangers F.C. =

Former association football club in Scotland

Southfield Rangers
- Nickname: the Rangers
- Founded: 1888
- Dissolved: 1891
- Ground: Townhead
- Secretary: Wm. M'Allister
- Captain: George Stewart
Home colours

Southfield Rangers Football Club was a Scottish association football club based in the village of Slamannan, Stirlingshire.

== History ==
The club from the village of Slamannan in Stirlingshire was founded in 1888, taking its name from Southfield Colliery Row in the village. Its first match was an 8–2 victory over Redding Athletic in April. A return match the following February led to Athletic's Robert Whyte being injured; he died three days later.

The club's first competitive football came in the 1889–90 Stirlingshire Cup; the club drew 2–2 with Dunipace at home in the first round, but lost heavily away. By March 1890, however, the club won 11 of 18 matches, and the season finished on a high, as the Rangers beat a scratch Falkirk 4–2, and the club even picked up some silverware; the Rangers won the inaugural Slamannan Charity Cup, beating Slamannan Rovers 4–3 in the final, scoring 2 goals in 2 minutes in the first half, after a 3–3 draw at Barnsmuir.

In August 1890, the club joined the Scottish Football Association. It made its Scottish Cup bow against Bridge of Allan the next month, the match being played at Forthbank as the Bridge of Allan ground was not ready. Surprisingly the Rangers were heavily defeated, by 7 goals to 2, and the club disappeared after a 5–1 defeat at Stenhousemuir in the Stirlingshire Cup.

== Colours ==
The club's colours were amber and black.

== Ground ==
The club played at the Townhead ground, which held 700 as a neutral ground for a cup tie between rivals Slamannan F.C. and Slamannan Rovers in 1890.
