= Campsie =

Campsie may refer to:

- Campsie, New South Wales, Australia
- Campsie, Alberta, Canada
- Campsie, County Tyrone, a townland in County Tyrone, Northern Ireland
- Campsie Fells, range of hills in Scotland
  - Campsie, Stirlingshire, historic civil parish based in the area
    - Milton of Campsie, town in the parish (now East Dunbartonshire)
      - Campsie F.C., football team based in the above town
    - Campsie Village, area of Lennoxtown in Campsie civil parish
      - Campsie Central F.C., football team based on Lennoxtown
  - Campsie Black Watch F.C., football team based in the above town

== See also ==
- Campsey, County Londonderry, Northern Ireland
- Kempsey (disambiguation)
