= Redding Athletic F.C. =

Former association football club in Scotland

Redding Athletic
- Full name: Redding Athletic Football Club
- Nickname: the Athletic
- Founded: 1886
- Dissolved: 1889
- Ground: Meadow Park
- Secretary: James Sims
Home colours

Redding Athletic Football Club was a Scottish association football club based in the village of Redding, Stirlingshire.

== History ==
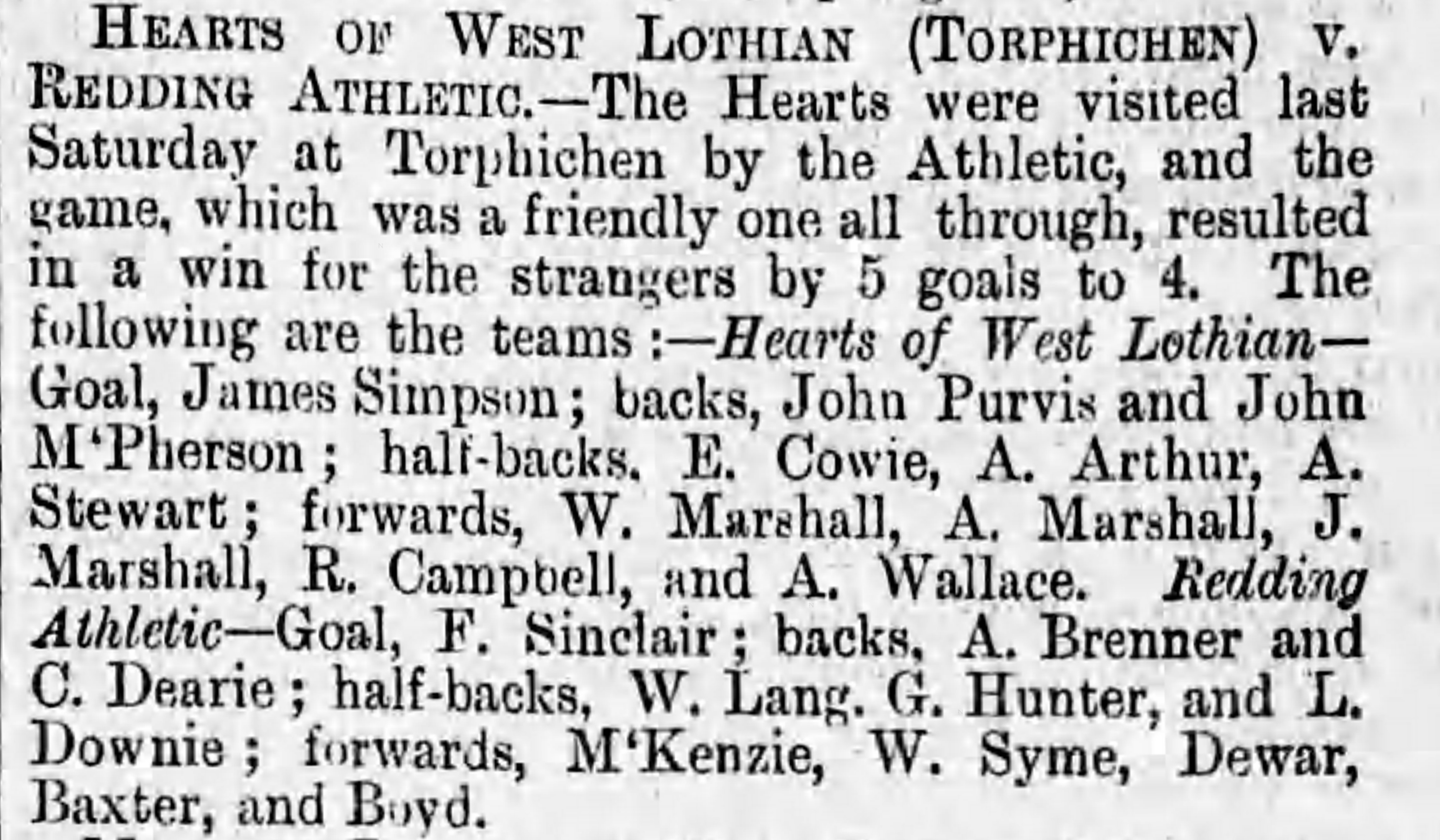
A rare win for the Athletic, in a friendly against a junior side, Lothian Courier, 14 July 1888

The club was founded in 1886. By this time there were a dozen senior clubs in Stirlingshire and Redding was the smallest village to host a club. The club did enter the 1887–88 Scottish Cup, and lost 4–3 to Grahamston in the first round. Redding had a reprieve when Grahamston was disqualified for playing two non-registered players, but it was a mixed blessing - in the second round, Redding was dismantled 17–0 at home to Camelon.

Its first entry to the Stirlingshire Cup in 1887–88 ended in the first round, 5–3 at home to Vale of Bannock. The club's treatment of its visitors showed that the attempt at senior status was far too ambitious; the gate for the tie was 9s 10d, suggesting that the paying attendance was around 20, and the club made a loss on the tie, having to pay 5s to the referee for travel costs and having incurred 5s in futile publicity for the tie. Redding's finances were in such straits that the Vale paid a penny towards the deficit.

In fact there is no record of the club having ever won a match against another senior side. The "home and home" fixtures with Laurieston in 1887–88 ended in 10–2 and 12–0 defeats. Even the Camelon reserve side beat the Athletic 6–1 at the start of 1888–89.

This run of results may have persuaded the club to scratch from its first round tie in the Scottish Cup against Gairdoch. It did however play in the Stirlingshire Cup in 1888–89, but it suffered another hammering, this time 15–1 in its first round tie at King's Park; the Athletic held out for 20 minutes, but was well behind before Gow scored an unexpected consolation.

As bad as these defeats were, the club suffered the worst possible tragedy on 23 February 1889, in a friendly against Southfield of Slamannan. Robert Whyte, a 23 year old player, suffered a kick to the abdomen, and retired to the dressing-room to rest. On the Sunday, it was noticed that his injury was more serious than thought, and he was taken for further medical care. Sadly, two days later, Whyte died.

This may have been the club's final match as there are no reports afterwards. Redding's short and tragic existence ended before the 1889–90 season, when the Scottish Football Association struck it from the roll for non-payment of subscriptions. The name was revived for a couple of pre-season five-a-side competitions in 1890 and 1891.

== Colours ==
The club wore black and blue hooped shirts with white knickers.

== Ground ==
The club's ground was originally at Broomfield Park. In 1888 the club moved to Meadow Park.
