= Alva F.C. =

Association football club in Scotland

Alva
- Full name: Alva Football Club
- Nickname: the Hillfoots
- Founded: 1887
- Dissolved: 1895
- Ground: East End Park, Craigleith Park, Glebe Park
- Hon. Secretary: Andrew Wright
- Match Secretary: W. Dobbie
Home colours

Alva Football Club was a football club based in Alva, Clackmannanshire.

== History ==
The first association football club in Alva was an army Volunteer club, which played a few low-key matches in the mid-1880s. One ill-tempered match with King's Park in 1886 may have been the impetus to form a club with a wider constituency, and a more representative Alva club was formed in 1887, with the Alva Volunteers no longer appearing in the fixture lists, and the first recorded fixture for Alva being a 4–2 home defeat to Alloa side Vale of Forth in September.

=== Early tournaments ===
With Clackmannanshire being too small to have a separate football association, Alva made its competitive debut in the Clackmannanshire Charity Cup in 1887–88. Protests and counter-protests meant that the club played its first round tie with Clackmannan three times, before finally winning through at Alloa Athletic's Bellevue Ground, and Alva won through to the final, losing 6–1 against the Athletic.

Alva was admitted as a member of the Scottish Football Association in August 1888 and entered the 1888–89 Scottish Cup. Alva beat Kilsyth Rangers 6–2 in the first round, but was outclassed in the second round, losing 6–0 at home to Campsie, with three goals against the Hillfoots in the first ten minutes, five in the first 25, and all six by the 35th.

=== Stirlingshire Cup and minor success ===
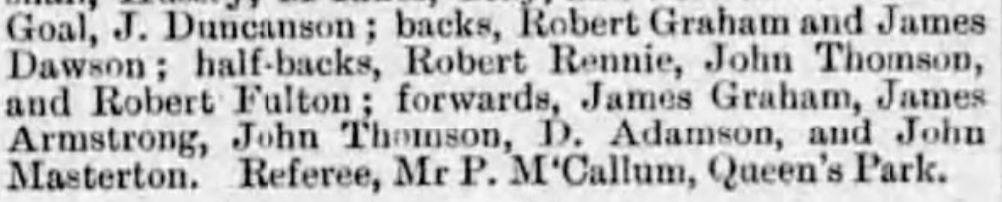
The Alva side which lost 6–3 to King's Park in the first round of the 1889–90 Scottish Cup, Bridge of Allan Gazette, 14 September 1889

In 1889, Alva joined the Stirlingshire Association, having already made its debut in the Stirlingshire Cup. Alva never had success in the tournament, although it recorded some big scores, notably a record 10–1 win at Grasshoppers in the 1889–90 edition (eight of the goals coming in the second half), and two matches against Dunipace in which Alva scored 6 but did not win; a 7–6 defeat in 1888–89 and a 6–6 draw in 1889–90, winning the replay 8–0. In the 1889–90 competition, Alva reached the semi-final, which was the club's best run in the Stirlingshire. It was unlucky to be drawn away in the semi-final, and lost 3–2 at Gairdoch; the lighter Alva side being bullied out of the game by the "Carron men", and protesting in vain about rough play.

Alva did have an unlikely success in an invitational tournament played between Alva, Alloa Athletic, Clackmannan, and King's Park at the close of the 1889–90 season; Alva beat the Stirling side and an Alloa side missing its best players "as usual", the latter 1–0 in a second extra-time period, in front of 1,000 spectators, to win its own tournament, the players earning themselves marble timepieces as prizes.

Alva reached the second round of the national competition again in 1890–91, losing at Camelon at that stage; the game ended "amid excitement", a goal from James Armstrong having halved the Camelon lead in the 87th minute and besieging the home side's goal at the last. The Scottish FA introduced a preliminary round phase from 1891 to 1892, and Alva never reached the main competition again.

The 1890–91 Charity Cup had a strange aftermath. The Hillfoots had lost to a Clackmannan side bolstered by three players whom Alva suspected came from Cowlairs, and therefore were not bona fide club members. Alva therefore engaged a private detective, one John Fairservice, but his investigations found that the players were indeed Clackmannan members, and Alva dropped the matter. However Alva protested at the 5 guinea charge and offered 2 guineas instead; Mr Fairservice sued and was awarded 3 guineas, plus 7s 4d expenses.

=== League competition and local champions ===
With the reduction in attractive fixtures due to this decision and the rise of various leagues, a number of clubs in the eastern central belt formed the Midland League at a meeting in an Alloa hotel in the summer of 1891; Alva was one of the ten founder members. Alva remained a member for four seasons, finishing nearer the bottom than the top in three of them, but in 1892–93 the club finished second, albeit some distance behind unbeaten champions King's Park. The club's consolation that season was its greatest honour, winning the Clackmannanshire Charity Cup for the only time by beating Alloa Athletic 5–0 in the final.

=== Final days ===
The rise of professionalism and League football gradually doomed the smaller clubs. By 1894, there were only three senior teams left in Clackmannanshire; the Charity Cup was played off with Alloa Athletic playing Alva, the losers playing Clackmannan, and the winners of that match playing the winners of the first match - Alva lost to Alloa, beat the Clacks, but lost again in the "final". That turned out to be the club's final match, Alva being struck from the Scottish FA membership roll in August 1895.

== Colours ==
The club originally played in black and white hooped shirts, with white (before 1889) or black knickers, the shirts described as "à la Queen's Park". From 1890 the hoops were rotated to vertical stripes.

In 1893, with a change of ground, the club also changed to red and white vertical stripes, but remained with black shorts. This change lasted for one season before the club reverted to black and white stripes.

== Ground ==
The club played at the following grounds:

- 1887–90: East End Park
- 1890–93: Craigleith Park
- 1893–95: Glebe Park

== Honours ==
- Clackmannan Charity Cup
  - Winners: 1892–93
  - Runners-up: 1887–88, 1891–92, 1894–95
- Midland League
  - Runners-up: 1892–93
- Alva Football Tournament
  - Winners: 1889–90
