= Grahamston F.C. =

Former association football club in Scotland

Grahamston
- Full name: Grahamston Football Club
- Founded: 1883
- Dissolved: 1890
- Ground: Crichton Park
- Secretary: Wm. Law
Home colours

Grahamston Football Club was a Scottish association football club based in the village of Grahamston, Stirlingshire, now part of Falkirk.

== History ==
Grahamston Football Club was founded in 1883 in the small industrial village of Grahamston, just north of Falkirk. The club played mostly friendly matches against clubs from nearby villages in its first season and joined the Stirlingshire Football Association in 1883–84, competing in the regional Stirlingshire Cup for the first time in February 1884, losing 1–0 to Strathblane in the first round. The following season, the club reached the semi-finals of the cup, losing 1–0 to Camelon for a place in the final; Grahamston did not have a shot on target in the first half.

In August 1885, the club was admitted to the Scottish Football Association and became eligible to compete in the Scottish Cup, entering the first round of the 1885–86 tournament a month later. Grahamston was drawn against Grasshoppers from Bonnybridge and drew the first match 2–2 away but lost the replay 4–2 at home. A year later, the club was again eliminated in the first round after losing 2–0 at home to Laurieston. The 1887–88 tournament was the last season Grahamston competed in the Scottish Cup. Drawn against Redding Athletic at home at Crichton Park in the first round, the club won the match 4–3, however, the result was protested because Grahamston fielded two unregistered players in the match (Alex Davidson and Alex Liddell) and was subsequently disqualified.

Grahamston continued to compete in the Stirlingshire Cup until 1889. After losing to Vale of Bannock in the first round in 1888–89 the club protested against the incompetence of the referee – the problem being that the official referee had not turned up, and, having won the toss to choose a replacement official, Grahamston had chosen one of its own. Grahamston subsequently withdrew the protest "to save themselves from being laughed at".

The club's senior existence came to an end in 1888, when it did not renew its Scottish FA subscription, and its defeat to Slamannan in the Stirlingshire Cup in 1889–90 seems to have been its final competitive match.

== Scottish Cup record ==
=== 1885–86 ===
- First round: drew 2–2 vs. Grasshoppers, 12 September 1885
  - First round replay: lost 4–2 vs. Grasshoppers, 19 September 1885

=== 1886–87 ===
- First round: lost 2–0 vs. Laurieston, 11 September 1886

=== 1887–88 ===
- First round: won 4–3 vs. Redding Athletic, 3 September 1887; disqualified.

== Colours ==
The club originally played in blue and black hooped jerseys with white knickers. From 1886 it wore cream jerseys and blue knickers.

== Ground ==
Grahamston played at Crichton Park, Kerse Lane, Falkirk.
