= Kempsey =

Kempsey may refer to the following places:

- Kempsey, New South Wales, Australia
- Kempsey, Worcestershire, England
- Kempsey Shire, a local government area in New South Wales

== See also ==
- Campsie (disambiguation)
- Campsey, County Londonderry, Northern Ireland
