= Bridge of Allan F.C. =

Former association football club in Scotland

Bridge of Allan
- Full name: Bridge of Allan Football Club
- Nickname(s): the Brig, the Spa' men
- Founded: 1878
- Dissolved: 1895
- Ground: Coneyhill Park
- Hon. President: Sir John Ewart, K.C.B.
- Secretary: William Henderson Jr, Gordon Smart
1878–82 colours	later colours

Bridge of Allan Football Club was a Scottish association football club based in Bridge of Allan, Stirlingshire.

== History ==
The club was founded in 1878. It joined the Scottish Football Association in 1880, entitling it to compete 1880–81 Scottish Cup, in which it lost to Central in the first round.

The club also competed in the competition in the following year, drawing twice with Thistle Athletic in the first round, which should have put both clubs into the second round; indeed Bridge of Allan was drawn to play Strathblane and Thistle given a bye at the next stage. However, perhaps to avoid giving a bye, a second replay was held, which Thistle won 8–0, Bridge of Allan only turning up with 9 men.

Following this lack of success, the club left the Scottish FA at the end of the 1881–82 season and went into abeyance, emerging in 1887 to take part in the Stirlingshire Cup. The Brig's first competitive win came in the competition in 1889–90, over Stirling Garrison in the first round, and in the second the club earned its biggest competitive win, hammering Rumford Rovers 13–0. The Brig lost 8–2 at Gairdoch in the quarter-final.

The club re-joined the Scottish FA in 1890, and in the 1890–91 Scottish Cup gained its first - and only - win in the main stage of the national competition, beating Southfield Rangers 7–2 in the first round. The Brig was drawn to host Vale of Leven in the second round, and startled its more illustrious opponent by taking the lead thanks to a goal from C. Reid, and keeping the score level at half-time; but the Vale recorded four unanswered goals in the second half.

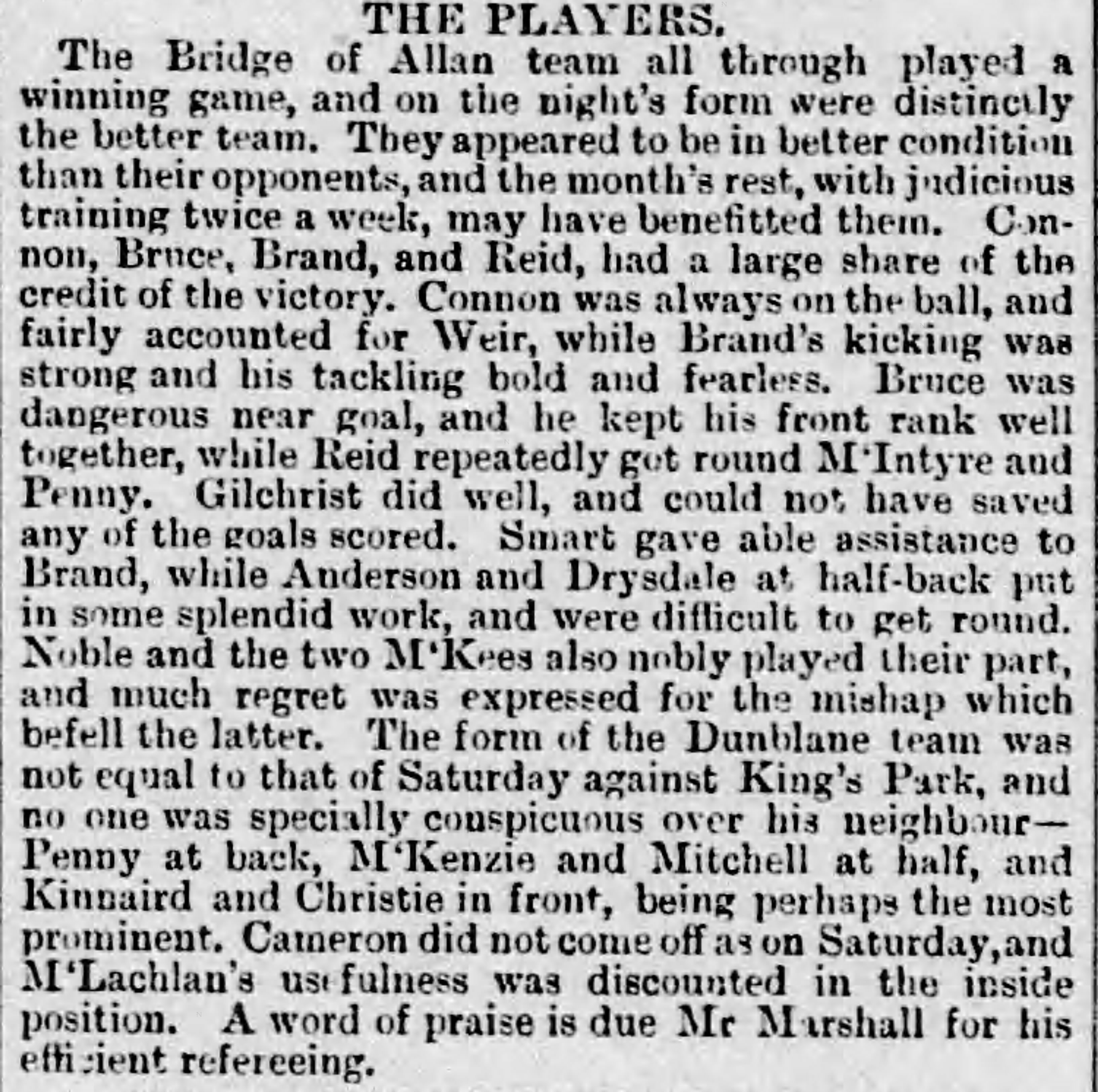
Notes on players in the Stirling Charity Cup final of 1891-92, in which Bridge of Allan beat Dunblane 3–2; Bridge of Allan Gazette, 11 June 1892

A qualifying section was added in 1891–92, and the club won through to the first round proper; the 1891–92 season also saw the club gain its greatest honour, by winning the Stirling Charity Cup, thanks to a 3–2 win over Dunblane at Forthbank. The players celebrated so much that three of them were fined 7s 6d (equivalent to £52 in 2023) for causing a breach of the peace.

The 1891–92 season also saw the club's debut in league competition, as a founder member of the Midland League. The club played in the competition for three seasons, finishing bottom in the 1893–94 campaign, with just one win in 16 matches.

The Brig's last Scottish Cup entry in 1894–95 proved abortive - the club was not allowed to play as it was suspended over non-payment of a debt of 7s 6d (equivalent to £54 in 2023). The club had also been replaced in the Midland League by Gairdoch and the club was defunct by April 1895; an ad hoc club formed for the Charity Cup at the end of the season, supposedly to be made up of former players from the Brig and other players from the Bridge of Allan Roamers club, was unsuccessful, the ensemble having also to rely on players from Queen's Park to make up an XI.

== Colours ==
The club's original colours were navy blue jerseys (with a red Maltese cross badge) and stockings with white knickers. By 1890, the club had adopted black and gold shirts with blue knickers.

== Ground ==
The club's first ground was Westerton Park, 10 minutes' walk from the local railway station. In 1881, the club's ground was Coney Hill Park (later rendered as Coneyhill), but, as it was the same distance from the station, and the club used the Westerton Park hotel for facilities, it may have been the same ground.
