= Central F.C. (Scotland) =

Former association football club in Scotland

Central
- Full name: Central Football Club
- Founded: 1879
- Dissolved: 1886
- Ground: Slatefield Park
- Secretary: Thomas Wark
| 1879–84 colours | 1884–86 colours |

Central Football Club was a football team from Lennoxtown, Stirlingshire, which once reached the quarter-finals of the Scottish Cup.

== History ==
The club was formed in November 1879. The club's recorded name was Central, the name referring to Lennoxtown being close to the centre of the parish of Campsie. The media sometimes referred to the club as Campsie Central.

It first entered the Scottish Cup in 1880–81 and had its best run, reaching the quarter-finals; indeed that season saw the club's only match wins in the competition. In the second round the club beat local rivals Milton of Campsie in a replay, in front of 600 spectators. The club received a bye in the fifth round, as the regional nature of the competition made some of the divisions slightly lop-sided; the sixth round – effectively the quarter-finals – had 6 clubs in it. The Central was drawn at home to eventual competition winners Queen's Park, the match being played on Christmas Day, and Campsie was outmatched from the start, eventually losing 10–1.

The following season the club was drawn to play the Bonnybridge Grasshoppers, but the club withdrew, unable to form an XI.

The Central did not enter the Scottish Cup in 1882–83 or 1883–84, but did so again in 1884–85. The club received a bye into the second round, but was hammered 14–0 by Vale of Leven, conceding seven goals in each half, but by the end of the season it was back to being one of the stronger clubs in Stirlingshire, with centre-forward Dempsey being chosen for the county representative side.

The club's last tie in the Scottish Cup was in 1885–86, losing 4–2 at Dunipace, despite taking a two-goal lead in the first ten minutes. The club however had its best run in the Stirlingshire Cup, reaching the semi-finals after beating Laurieston 4–0 away in the first round, getting a bye in the second, and beating Comely Park of Falkirk 5–2 in a third round replay. The run came to an end at home to King's Park; the difficulties for the Lennoxtown club shown by the match receipts being 3d 2qua short of £1, the match being delayed because one of its players had not turned up, then the first match ball bursting "and no wonder, seeing the sort of ball it was" after half-an-hour; the club had one other ball available, which it used in its practice matches, and that too burst with seven minutes to go. There was no replacement, but, as the visitors were 4–1 up, the result was allowed to stand. Central did protest as to the state of the pitch, half-covered in snow and half-covered in meltwater, but the protest was not upheld, on the basis that it was the club's own pitch and it had telegrammed to say the match could proceed.

Despite this comparative local success, the club did not emerge for the 1886–87 season, presumably because of a lack of finances, and its players joined fellow village side Campsie F.C. instead.

== Colours ==
The club originally played in blue and white, but on its revival wore white shirts, blue knickers, and red hose.

== Ground ==
The club originally played at Slatefield Park, at Balcurroch, in Lennoxtown. The facilities were basic and lacked the by-now customary pavilion, so visiting teams had to change in a nearby pub.
