= Thistle Athletic F.C. =

Association football club in Dunbartonshire, Scotland

Thistle Athletic
- Full name: Thistle Athletic Football Club
- Founded: 1875/8
- Dissolved: 1885
- Ground: Drumclog Park
- Secretary: John D. G. Thomson
Milngavie colours	Thistle Athletic colours

Thistle Athletic Football Club was an association football club based in the town of Milngavie, at the time in Dunbartonshire.

== History ==
=== Milngavie Football Club ===
The first senior club in the town was the Milngavie club, founded in 1875. It first recorded fixture was a 1–0 home defeat to the Grafton club of Glasgow at the start of the 1876–77 season.

The club entered the Scottish Cup for the first time in 1877–78, and won at Alexandria, scoring in the second half after Alexandria dominated the first. The club was brought down to earth by a 9–0 defeat at Lennox in the second.

=== Thistle Athletic Football Club ===
There is no further record of the Milngavie club; for the 1878–79 season, the town was represented by a club registered under the name of Thistle, which gave its foundation date as being 1878. The club however played at the same ground as Milngavie and had the same club secretary, so was either a continuation of Milngavie, or a successor club.

Whether the Thistle was the same club as Milngavie or a separate club was not clear (or apparently important) at the time. The club's first Scottish Cup tie, in the first round in 1878–79, was certainly a 3–0 defeat at Lenzie, with Thistle disputing one of the goals. However, the North British Daily Mail gives the club's name as Milngavie, the Glasgow Herald as Thistle Athletics [sic] and the Milngavie Club, the Scotsman as Thistle (Milngavie), and the Scottish Football Association Yearbook as Milngavie Thistle. One practical difference was that the Thistle club was entered in the Stirlingshire section of the Scottish Cup, whereas, as Milngavie, the club was considered a Dunbartonshire club.

In 1879, the club formally recorded its name as Thistle Athletic. It entered the Scottish Cup under that name until 1881–82; the club scratched to Lenzie before playing in 1880–81.

Its best run in the competition came in 1881–82. In the first round, the club drew twice with Bridge of Allan, which should have put both clubs into the second round; indeed Bridge of Allan was drawn to play Strathblane and Thistle a bye at the next stage. However, perhaps to avoid giving a bye, a second replay was held, which Thistle won 8–0, Bridge of Allan only turning up with 9 men. Thistle duly took Bridge of Allan's place against Strathblane in the second round, and won 3–2; Strathblane protested against the competence of the referee, but the SFA took the dimmest view, refusing the protest and retaining Strathblane's protest deposit money. The run came to an end against Falkirk with a 2–0 home defeat, the Thistle being accused of playing a "very rough game".

=== Reversion to Milngavie ===
In 1882, the club changed its name (back) to Milngavie, although it remained within the Stirlingshire region. It was the club's final season as a senior club; although it enjoyed a fine win at home to East Stirlingshire in the first round of the 1882–83 Scottish Cup, it was hammered 16–0 by Vale of Leven in the second round, which equalled the world record defeat in competitive football (set by Wanderers against Farningham in the 1874–75 FA Cup).

The club was struck from the Scottish FA membership roll in August 1883. Milngavie carried on for two seasons, being one of the first clubs to join the Stirlingshire Association in early 1884, and played twice in the Stirlingshire Cup. Its first entry, in 1883–84, ended with a 5–0 defeat to Falkirk in the second round, but the club was particularly unlucky in its last entry in 1884–85. Milngavie beat Camelon 2–1 in the first round, but the tie was re-played on the basis that "the referee was in an intoxicated state". Camelon won the replay, at neutral ground in Stenhousemuir, 4–1; Milngavie put in a successful protest on the basis that one of the Camelon players had already represented Tayavalla in the competition, but the Stirlingshire committee ordered another replay, and Milngavie appears to have disbanded before the replay could take place. Camelon went on to win the trophy.

The Milngavie name was used from 1888 for an unconnected Junior club.

== Colours ==
As Milngavie, the club played in 1" blue and white hooped shirts, white knickers, and red hose. As Thistle, the club played in 2" red and yellow hooped jerseys and dark blue knickers.

For the club's final incarnation, from 1882–83, it wore all white.

== Ground ==
The club played at Drumclog Park, ten minutes' walk from Milngavie railway station.
