= Vale of Bannock F.C. =

Former association football club in Scotland

Vale of Bannock
- Full name: Vale of Bannock Football Club
- Nickname(s): the Vale, the Black and Red
- Founded: 1880
- Dissolved: 1894
- Ground: Viewvale Park
- Secretary: Alex. Kemp
1887–94 colours

Vale of Bannock Football Club was a Scottish association football club based in the town of Bannockburn, Stirlingshire.

== History ==
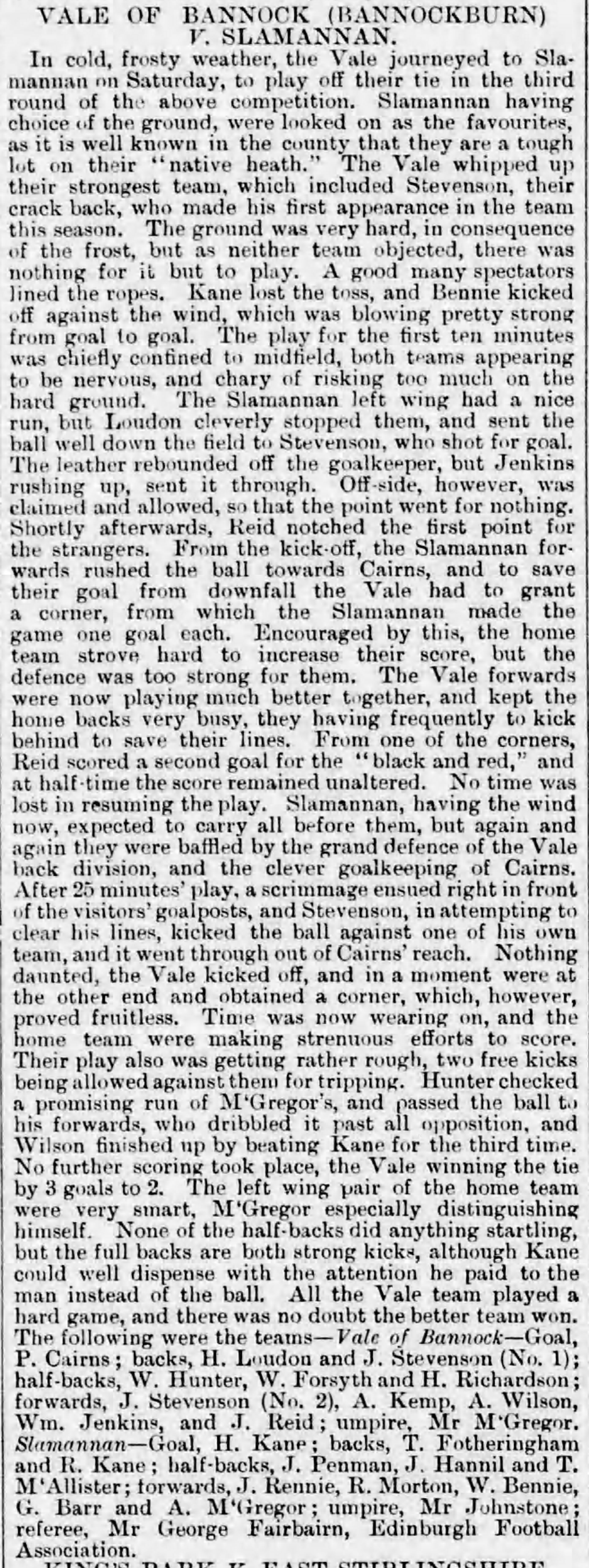
The club's finest win – 3–2 over Slamannan in the quarter-final of the Stirlingshire Cup in 1887–88, Bridge of Allan Gazette, 17 December 1887

The club was founded in 1880. The club took part in the first Stirlingshire Cup in 1883–84 and in 1886 joined the Scottish Football Association, making it eligible to enter the Scottish Cup from the 1886–87 season.

=== Scottish Cup ===
The club won two ties in the main rounds of the Scottish Cup before the introduction of qualifying rounds from 1891 to 1892, after which the club never qualified for the first round again. Both times it did so (in 1886–87 and 1888–89) the club was drawn to face East Stirlingshire in the second round; the first time the club scratched rather than face inevitable defeat, the second time it did turn up, but lost 11–2, which remains the Shire's joint-record victory.

For the most part the Vale was just as unsuccessful in the regional tournament, its first round defeat to Grangemouth in 1891–92 seeing the club concede 6 goals in the first 10 minutes; the start being blamed on a rough carriage journey. The game finished 10–0, Graham of Grangemouth scoring a double hat-trick.

=== Stirlingshire Cup run ===
The club's best run in the Stirlingshire Cup 1887–88; the Vale was 2–1 up against Campsie in its first tie in 1883–84 with half-an-hour remaining when Campsie walked off due to the "hopeless" weather of a "perfect gale of wind and sleet", and Campsie won the replay. In 1887–88, the club went on a remarkable run to the semi-final, winning 5–3 at Redding Athletic and 3–2 against Slamannan en route. The win at tiny Redding was somewhat Pyrrhic, as not only did the minuscule gate (of no more than 30) mean that there was no gate money for the Vale to share, but the Vale was even forced to pay a penny towards the refereeing expenses.

In the semi-final, it took Falkirk three matches to beat the Vale; the original tie ended in a Falkirk win, but was ordered to be replayed, the match finishing in the dark after Falkirk turned up late at Viewvale Park. The replay, also at Viewvale, ended in a draw, Falkirk taking the lead through a freak own goal after a high defensive header "by the force of the wind was carried throughb just below the bar, somewhat to the astonishment of the goalkeeper and the spectators", but the Vale equalized the tie at 2–2 in the 89th minute.

Falkirk finally won through 4–1 at Brockville, in front of 3,000 spectators, although there was adverse comment about the "brutality and treachery which are characteristic of the Falkirk team", Law being sent off for kicking Kemp early in the second half, but the Vale gaining no advantage as Kemp had to leave the field.

Nevertheless, the Vale had made friends through its plucky efforts, with many neutrals hoping to see the club win the Stirling Charity Cup, in which it had reached the final for the first time. However the club was handicapped by losing Stevenson to Aberdeen and Hunter to injury, and was hammered 8–0 by King's Park.

=== End of the club ===
The Vale had one final hurrah in the Charity Cup in 1892–93, beating Bridge of Allan in the semi-final, but again lost 8–0 to King's Park in the final. The club withdrew from the Scottish and Stirlingshire Cups in 1893–94 before playing a fixture, and, along with fellow Stirlingshire senior sides Campsie, Denny, and Bridge of Allan, "gave up the ghost" in 1894, the blame being put on the effects of professionalism.

== Colours ==
The club originally played in "sombre" dark blue and red hooped jerseys, with white knickers. By 1887 the jerseys were black and red hoops.

== Ground ==
The club's first ground was Viewvale Park; from 1884 to 1888 it played at Muir Park before returning to Viewvale in early 1888, there still being unset tar on the fittings for the Stirlingshire Cup tie with Falkirk. The highest recorded crowd was 800, against King's Park in the 1888–89 Charity Cup semi-final.
