= Clydebank Athletic F.C. =

Scottish football club

Clydebank Athletic
- Full name: Clydebank Athletic Club
- Nickname: the Athletic
- Founded: 1882
- Dissolved: 1893
- Ground: Whitecrook Park
- Match Secretary: P. A. Talbot
Home colours

Clydebank Athletic Football Club was a 19th-century football club based in Clydebank, Scotland.

== History ==
The first record of the club is a home match in October 1882 against a side called Meadowbank, who played at Glasgow Green.

The club played on a local level until joining the Scottish Football Association, with 31 other clubs, in August 1890. The club thereupon entered the 1890–91 Scottish Cup. In its first tie, the Athletic won 6–3 at Campsie Hibernians of Lennoxtown, and was drawn at home in the second round to Kilsyth Wanderers. The Athletic took a three-goal lead in the first half, and was still 3 goals to the good on the hour mark, but a remarkable Cuthbert-inspired comeback saw the Wanderers win with 5 goals in the last half-an-hour. The same season, the club entered the Dumbartonshire Cup for the first time, but lost 3–1 at Union in the first round.

The Athletic's move to senior football had come at the wrong time. The Scottish League, formed in 1890, took away the opportunity for friendly fixtures with bigger sides, and Dumbartonshire had three representatives in the first league season; further, in 1891–92, the Scottish FA introduced qualifying rounds for the Scottish Cup, with the top clubs exempt from qualifying and thus removing further opportunities from the smaller clubs. The Athletic entered both the national and county competitions that season, and faced a difficult task in the Scottish, in being drawn away at King's Park in the first preliminary round. The Athletic took an unexpected lead, but it looked as if its chances had gone when, at 2–1 down, one of the Athletic players was ordered off the park for using foul language, and the game was held up for several minutes while he refused to leave the pitch. Even so, the Athletic equalized through an own goal, and, having gone behind again, "astonished the spectators" in making it 3–3 just after half-time, before King's Park scored twice to make the tie secure.

The club's first tie in the Dumbartonshire, against Jamestown, was abandoned after 75 minutes because of bad light; the re-played tie ended 2–2, and Jamestown won the replay 4–1. The Athletic finished the season by being invited to play in the Buchanan Cup, a charity tournament for clubs in the Dumbartonshire area, and entered two sides. However the first XI lost 5–1 at Clydebank and the second XI lost 10–0 at Clydebank's second XI, although in reality it was the Athletic's second X, as one man did not turn up and the club borrowed a spectator for the match.

In the 1892–93 season, the club did not enter the Dumbartonshire, and scratched from the Scottish, and no more is heard of the club.

== Colours ==
The club originally played in "dark navy blue". In 1891 it changed to white shirts with blue knickers.

== Ground ==
The club played at Whitecrook Park in Clydebank.

== See also ==
- History of football in Clydebank
