= Slamannan Rovers F.C. =

Former association football club in Scotland

Slamannan Rovers
- Full name: Slamannan Rovers Football Club
- Nickname: Rovers
- Founded: 1887
- Dissolved: 1902
- Ground: the Glebe
- President: William McAllister
Home colours

Slamannan Rovers Football Club was a Scottish association football club based in the village of Slamannan, Stirlingshire.

== History ==
The club was founded in 1887 as a Junior club. In 1888–89, the club reached the semi-final of the Falkirk Junior Cup, but lost 9–2 to Excelsior of Falkirk, seven of the goals being scored by Ross. Rovers protested on the basis that the referee had wrongly awarded 7 goals. Remarkably, the Falkirk & District Junior Association upheld the protest, leading to the media suggesting that next time Rovers should protest 8 goals to win outright. Ultimately Excelsior won through to the final, which it won 7–3 against Falkirk Athletic.

In 1891 the Rovers joined the Scottish Football Association, thus becoming a senior club, with an entitlement to enter the Scottish Cup and the Stirlingshire Cup. The club's first tie in the latter competition, in 1891–92, was against village rivals Slamannan F.C., and Rovers - the heavier side - won 5–2.

The club only retained senior status from the 1891–92 season to the 1894–95 season, only once reaching the third round of the Stirlingshire Cup, in 1892–93.

Rovers were forced to enter the Scottish Cup in the preliminary rounds instituted in 1891–92; in its first season, the club lost 8–1 at Bathgate Rovers F.C. in the second preliminary round, having gone in at half-time 7–0 down, and the Slamannan goal being a late own-goal.

In 1894–95, the club won through to the first round proper for the only time. The club beat Bonnybridge Grasshoppers F.C. 7–0 away from home in the first round; Grasshoppers protested that Patrick Fisher, who had previously played as a professional for the now-defunct Dundee Harp F.C., had not been registered as an amateur. Fisher explained that he assumed the dissolution of the Harp meant he returned to amateur status. The Scottish Football Association censured Fisher and ordered a re-play; however Grasshoppers instead scratched. Rovers beat Stenhousemuir F.C. 3–1 in the second round and Adventurers F.C. in the third, with a bye putting the club in the first round proper.

The tie against Renton F.C. ended in controversy. The game itself, at the Glebe, before a crowd of 880, had been violent; by half-time, each side was down to 9 men. With six minutes to go, and Renton 3–2 up, the Slamannan fans invaded the pitch, in protest at a Rovers player having been injured. Renton claimed the tie; the Rovers appealed on the basis that the players were not to blame, and M'Call of Renton had incited the crowd by offering to fight any of the Rovers supporters for £5. The tie was replayed at Renton (on the chairman's casting vote) and this time Renton won with some ease, only goalkeeper Bell keeping the score down to 4–0.

The club scratched from its entry to the Scottish Cup the next season, and did not enter the Stirlingshire Cup, instead reverting to Junior football and dissolving in 1902. The name was revived for another Junior club in the 1920s.

== Colours ==
The club played in all navy blue.

== Ground ==
The club's first permanent ground was the Glebe, and the club's first match there was in January 1888; a 7–6 win over Stanley Swifts of Glasgow, although the pitch was described as "very wet and muddy, and altogether unsuitable for playing".

== Notable players ==
- Andrew Burt, later a player for Falkirk F.C. in the Scottish League
