= Strathblane F.C. =

Association football club in Stirlingshire, Scotland

Strathblane
- Full name: Strathblane Football Club
- Nicknames: the Strath Lads, Strathians
- Founded: 1877
- Dissolved: 1885
- Ground: Cuilt Park
- Secretary: Thomas Thorpe
Home colours

Strathblane Football Club was a Scottish football club located in Strathblane, Stirlingshire.

== History ==
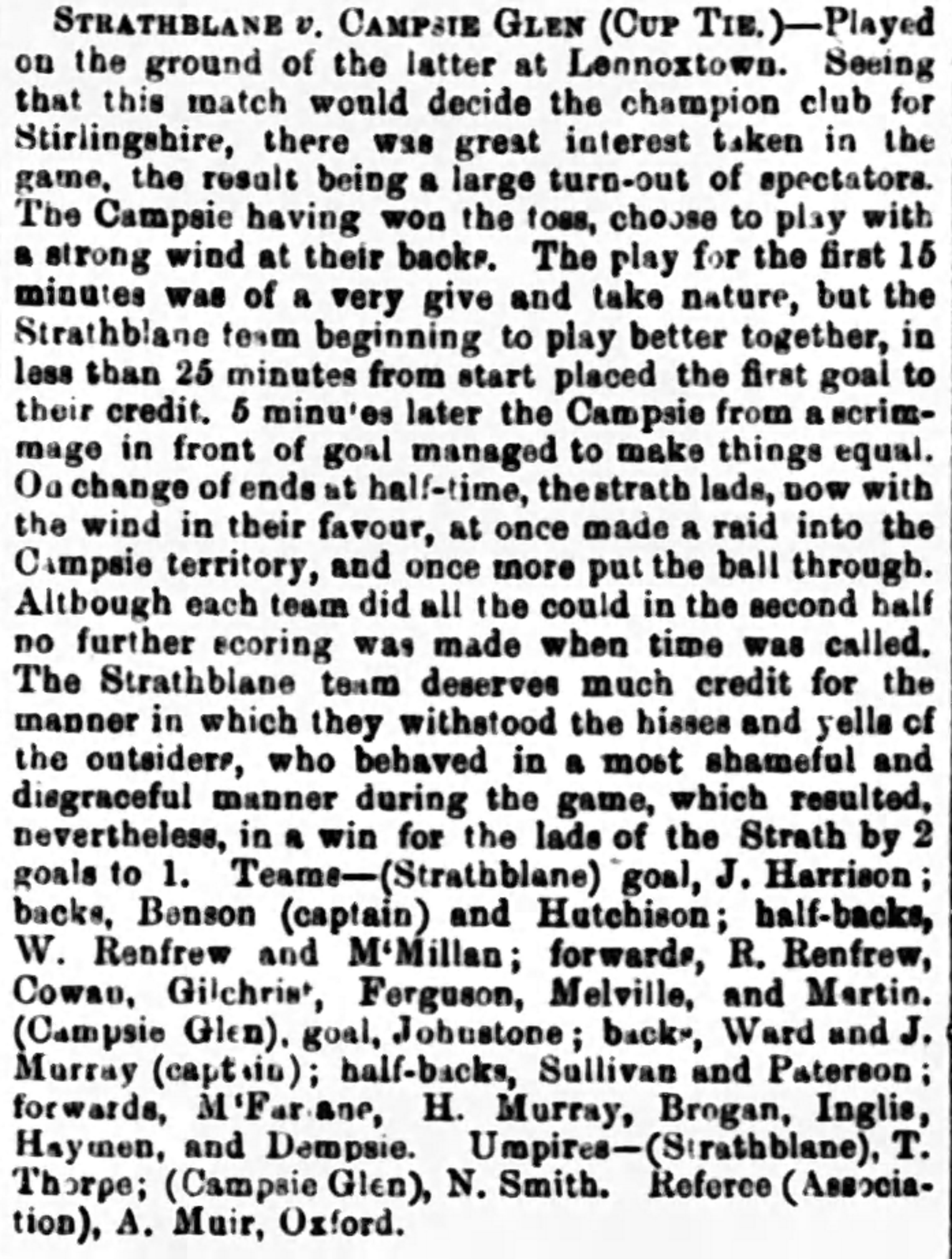
Campsie Glen 1–2 Strathblane, 1879–80 Scottish Cup 3rd Round, Stirling Saturday Observer, 6 November 1879

The club was founded in 1877 and its earliest recorded fixture was against the 10th D.R.V. in December 1877.

Strathblane was one of the first six senior clubs to be founded in Stirlingshire. It was a regular entrant to the Scottish Cup from 1878–79 for 7 seasons.

Its first match in the competition was its biggest win, by 8 goals (plus one disputed) to 1 over Bonnybridge Grasshoppers. Its best run came in 1879–80. The club beat Lenzie 1–0 in the first round, Falkirk by the same score in a "very pleasant and enjoyable game" in the second, and Campsie Glen in the third, to become the "champion club of Stirlingshire" and be the county's representative in the national stage, consisting of 22 clubs. The gap between the top clubs of the Glasgow and Dunbartonshire areas, and the "country" clubs, was demonstrated by the club then losing 10–1 at Queen's Park. Nevertheless "the Strathhians" [sic] received praise for their play "in many respects [being] superior to that shown by several clubs with bigger reputations who have had to succumb to the Queen's Park this season", the blame for the scale of the defeat being put on a goalkeeper who "was not the smartest, and seemed to get confused when trying to help his team".

The club's Cup record followed a pattern of Strathblane generally winning matches against other Stirlingshire clubs and losing to those outside the county. Its biggest defeat in the competition came in 1882–83; after another first round win over Lenzie, Strathblane lost 12–1 at Jamestown in the second.

As an early member of the Stirlingshire Football Association, founded in 1883, the club played in the first Stirlingshire Cup in 1883–84. Two wins took the club into the semi-final, where it lost 2–1 to East Stirlingshire.

The club consistently had 30–35 members, which meant it was overtaken by clubs such as Falkirk and King's Park. Its matches also dried up, with only half-a-dozen played in 1881–82 and 1883–84; as a minor side from a small village, Strathblane was not an attraction for friendly matches.

Its last fixture in the Scottish Cup was a 3–2 defeat at Stenhousemuir in the first round in 1883–84 and Strathblane withdrew from the 1884–85 Scottish Cup when drawn to face Falkirk. It did play in the Stirlingshire Cup, but lost 1–0 to Grahamston in its only tie. The Scottish Football Association struck the club from the membership list before the 1885–86 season.

== Colours ==
The club played in black and white hooped jerseys and white knickers.

== Grounds ==
The club originally played at Cuilt Park, 2 minutes' walk from Blanefield railway station. In 1884 the club moved to a new ground, Blanefield Park, a quarter of a mile from the station.
