= Dunipace F.C. (1879) =

Association football club in Dunbartonshire, Scotland

Dunipace
- Full name: Dunipace Football Club
- Founded: 1879
- Dissolved: 1902
- Ground: Broomhill Farm
- Hon. President: Provost Hunter
- President: John C. Wright
Home colours

Dunipace Football Club was an association football club based in the town of Denny, in Stirlingshire.

== History ==
The club was founded in 1879 out of the Temperance movement; in 1888–89 the club registered its name as Dunipace Temperance Association.

It was not a particularly active club, not playing more than 10 matches in a season until 1884–85. It was also not a successful one. Dunipace entered the Scottish Cup every season from 1881–82 to 1902–03 (except for 1887–88), but never reached the third round.

The club's best performance came in the 1883–84 Scottish Cup, beating Campsie 2–1 in the first round, and holding the much bigger East Stirlingshire side (which had 90 members compared to Dunipace's 40) to a 2–2 draw, only losing 2–1 in the home replay.

Dunipace however was a founder member of the Stirlingshire Football Association in December 1883, and played in the first Stirlingshire Cup in 1883–84. Dunipace looked as if it would bring off a shock by taking a 2–0 half-time lead in the first round at King's Park, but the club had had the benefit of "a perfect gale of wind and sleet", and only 6 of the Dunipace players "faced the elements", so the match was abandoned. The Stirling side won the rescheduled tie 13–0, with Dunipace having kept the score down to 2 in the first half.

Dunipace's best run in the county competition was reaching the semi-final in 1888–89, surviving a "rather unexpected" defeat by one-season wonder Strathcarron Athletic in the first round after Strathcarron was disqualified, and beating Alva 7–6 in the second round after Alva protested Dunipace's original victory. The run ended with a 5–2 defeat at holders East Stirlingshire, despite Dunipace playing "superior to what was expected" and turning around level at 1–1, who went on to retain the trophy. The same season, the club played in the invitational Stirling Charity Cup, and lost in the semi-final to Dunblane at Bannockburn.

After the Scottish Football Association introduced a qualifying section and then the Scottish Qualifying Cup, the club did not reach the first round proper again. Its last fixture in the competition was a 10–1 defeat at home to Lochgelly United in 1902; it had not won a tie since beating Gairdoch 4–2 in 1895. The club had already given up on the local competitions, losing 2–1 to Camelon in the first round of the 1901–02 Stirlingshire Cup and not playing in the consolation tournament.

== Colours ==
The club's colours were red and white hoops, with white knickers, until 1897, when it changed to maroon and blue.

== Ground ==
The club originally played at Broomhill Farm. In 1888–89 it moved to Bankend, and from 1891 to 1892 played at George's Park, near Dunipace Public School.
