= Campsey =

Village in County Londonderry, Northern Ireland

- village
- Location within Northern Ireland
- Coordinates: 55°01′41″N 7°13′19″W
- Country: United Kingdom
- Division: Northern Ireland
- County: County Londonderry
- District area: Derry and Strabane

Campsey or Campsie (from Irish Camsan or Camasaigh, meaning "River Bends") is a small village in County Londonderry, Northern Ireland. In the 2001 Census it had a population of 195 people. It is near Derry city and within the Derry and Strabane district area.

Campsey is an industrial zone with a business park.
