= Camelon F.C. (1884) =

Association football club in Scotland

Camelon
- Full name: Camelon Football Club
- Nickname(s): the Mariners
- Founded: 1884
- Dissolved: 1905
- Ground: Victoria Park
Home colours

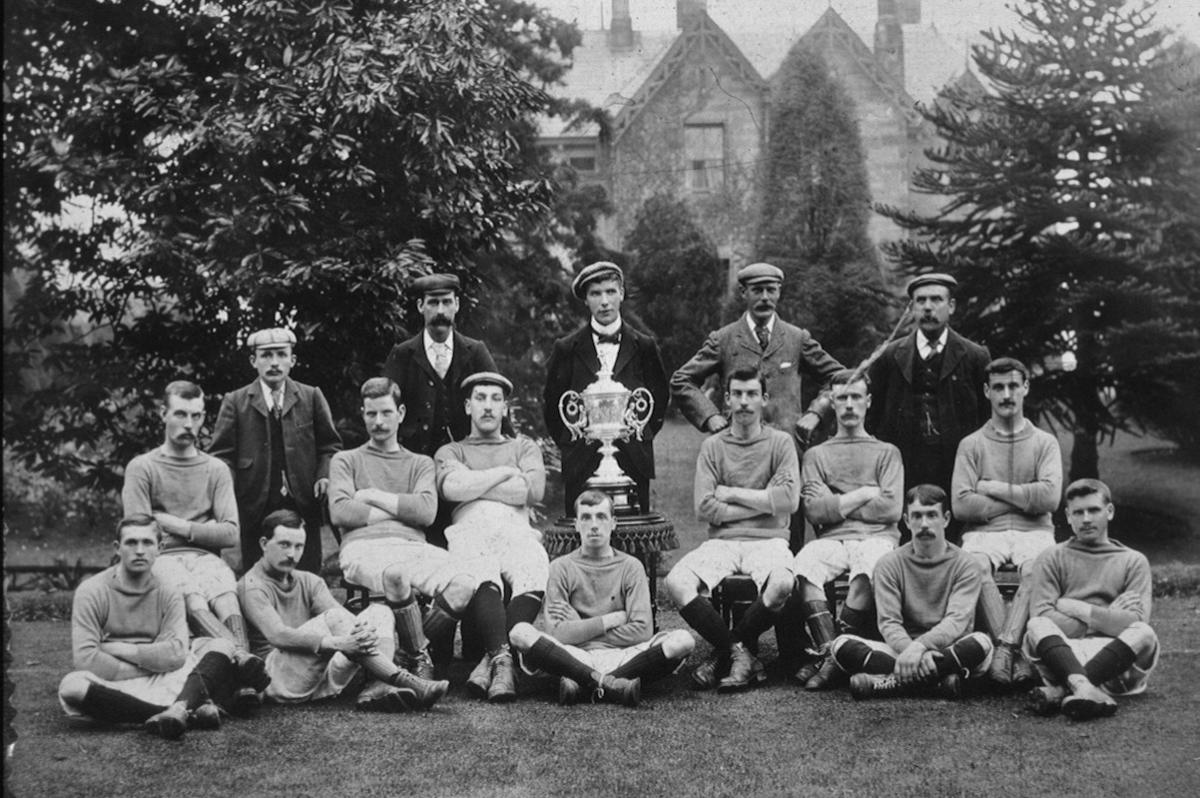
Camelon FC, 1898, with the Stirlingshire Cup

Camelon Football Club was a football club from the town of Camelon, Stirlingshire, Scotland. The club twice won the Stirlingshire Cup in the late 19th century but was wound up in 1905.

== History ==
Camelon was formed as a split from Tayavalla F.C. in 1884. The new club promptly entered the Stirlingshire Cup, which had taken place for the first time the previous season. Camelon's first match in the competition was not auspicious. The club lost 2–1 at Milngavie F.C., but was re-played on the basis that "the referee was in an intoxicated state". Camelon won the replay, at neutral ground in Stenhousemuir, 4–1, and went on to win the trophy. The final, against Campsie F.C., went to two replays and extra-time before Camelon won 2–1, and survived a protest relating to a disallowed goal after the Camelon team dragged their goalkeeper Nisbet - with the ball - to the side of the goal during a scrimmage.

Camelon also reached the final of the Falkirk & District Charity Shield, but lost in a second replay to East Stirlingshire 2–1. During the season, Camelon played Tayavalla for the only time; that the split had been in Camelon's favour was shown by Camelon winning 6–1.

Perhaps emboldened by this success, the club entered the Scottish Cup for the first time in 1885–86, but was unlucky to draw Falkirk F.C. - the first winners of the Stirlingshire Cup - in the first round and lost 3–1 in a "perfect gale". The club also lost to Campsie in the first round of the Stirlingshire Cup, and a protest about Campsie's rough play was dismissed.

=== Scottish Cup runs ===
Camelon twice reached the third round of the Scottish Cup. The first time, in 1887–88, was after a surprise first round win at King's Park F.C. by 5 goals to 1. Camelon had to field a reserve in goal, who adopted the tactic of wearing "very wide dark trousers", which stopped one goal; another was stopped by defender Reid punching the ball out, and, in the days before penalty kicks, King's Park could not force the ball over the line in the resulting free-kick scrimmage. In the second round, Camelon recorded its biggest competitive win, 17–0 over Redding Athletic. However, in the third, the club was drawn at home to eventual winners Renton and lost 8–0.

The second time was in 1889–90. The club drew 3–3 at East Stirlingshire in the third round, three times taking the lead, but in a remarkable replay at Victoria Park, witnessed by 1,500 spectators, with neither side making any changes, the Shire went through in a sixteen-goal thriller; the half-time score being 4–1 in favour of the visitors, who increased their lead to 6–1 early in the second, before the score went 6–2, 6–3, 7–3, 8–3, 8–4, 8–5, 9–5, 9–6, and finished at 10–6.

=== Local leagues ===
The introduction of the Scottish League saw clubs that had not been included trying to form leagues more locally. Camelon was one of the ten sides which formed the Midland League in 1891, with secretary Murphy appointed secretary of the league at the inaugural meeting in Alloa, and the club remained a member until 1897, when it left with most of the surviving clubs to form the Central Football Combination. The club played in the Combination until 1903; for three seasons, it played with five other clubs in the Falkirk area in the Falkirk & District League. The club was generally a mid-table side throughout its tenure of all three competitions, although it was runner-up on three occasions.

=== Second Stirlingshire Cup triumph ===
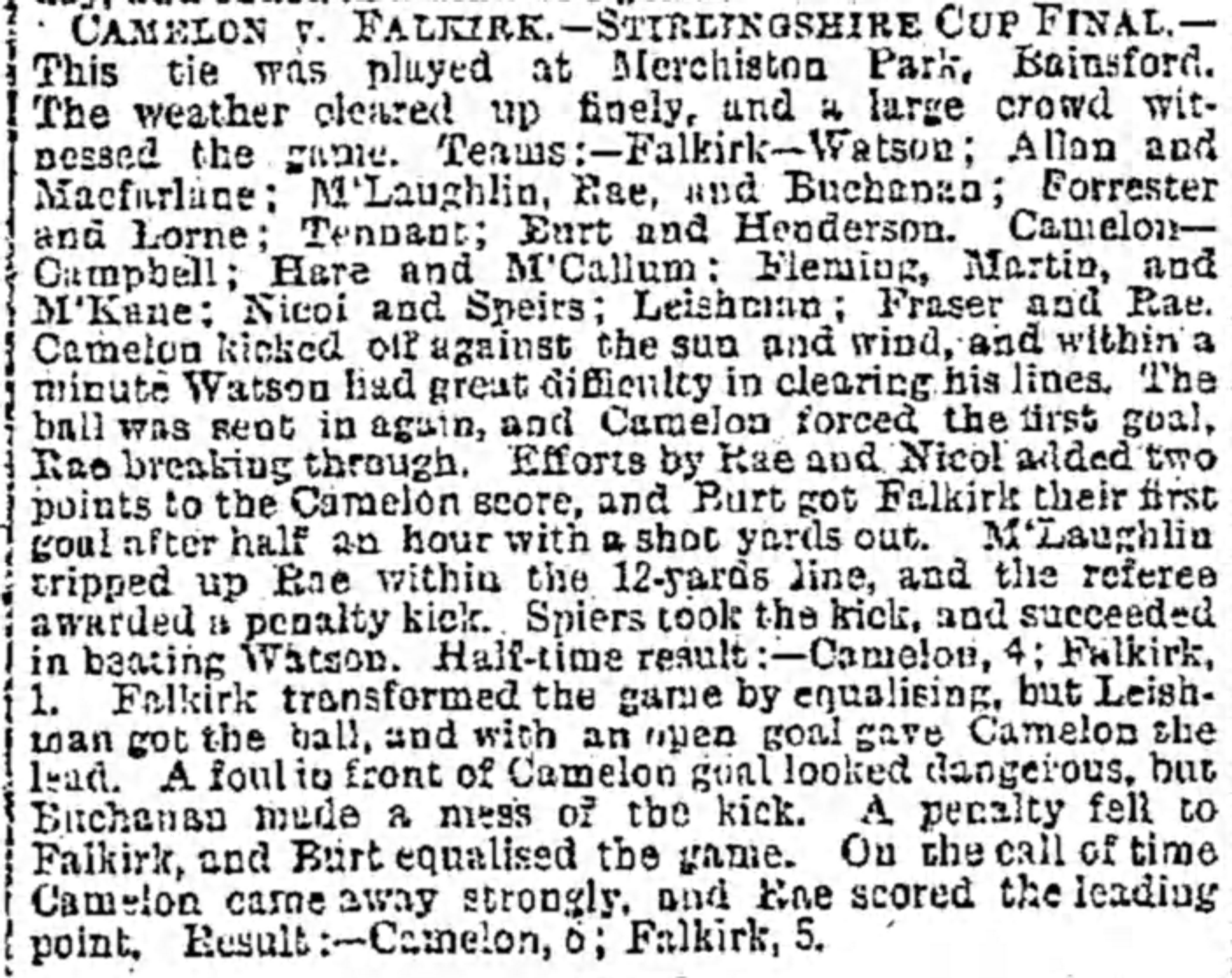
Camelon 6–5 Falkirk, 1897–98 Stirlingshire Cup Final, from the Glasgow Herald, 28 February 1898

With regular league football, the club was in a better position than most other amateur clubs in the area, and in 1897–98 the club reached the final of the Stirlingshire Cup for a second time, against Falkirk. The two sides met the week before the final in the Central Combination, the Mariners winning 2–1. The final was held at East Stirlingshire's ground, and Camelon won a thrilling game with a last-minute winner.

Camelon reached the final for the next four seasons, but lost every time; twice to Stenhousemuir, once to King's Park, and once to East Stirlingshire. The club gained some revenge over Stenhousemuir by winning the Consolation Cup final in 1903–04 against the Warriors.

During this run of finals, the club had its best run in the Scottish Qualifying Cup, in 1902–03, beating Falkirk in the third round to gain entry to the Scottish Cup proper for the first time since 1892. In the first round, the club proved "quite a handful" for Ayr F.C. before going down 2–0.

=== Combination ===
The club stepped up to the national stage in 1903–04, by joining the Scottish Football Combination. The move effectively killed the club. Although the Mariners finished mid-table in its first season, the extra costs proved crippling for the club. It only managed 7 matches in the 1904–05 season before being expelled for not fulfilling its fixtures.

=== Junior football ===
A new Junior club was founded in the aftermath, playing at the Camelon Public Park, but this side petered out in 1910. A new club, Camelon Juniors F.C., was formed in 1920 to provide football in the town.

== Colours ==
The club originally played in black and white "quarters" - in the context of the time, this refers to halves, with the sleeves counterchanged - and navy shorts. In 1886 the club changed its shirts to chocolate and blue halves but retained the shorts. From 1897 the club wore blue shirts and white shorts. Its change jersey was white.

== Ground ==
The club originally played home matches at Camelon House, but moved to the Victoria Park from 1885. Victoria Park was used as the venue for the final of the Stirlingshire Cup every year from 1886 to 1891, except for 1890.

== Notable players ==
- William Allan, played for the club in 1900
- John Bainbridge, future Falkirk right-back, played for the club in 1892–93
