= Kilsyth Wanderers F.C. =

Former association football club in Scotland

Kilsyth Wanderers
- Full name: Kilsyth Wanderers Football Club
- Nickname(s): the Wanderers
- Founded: 1885
- Dissolved: 1902
- Ground: Garrel Gardens Park
Home colours

Kilsyth Wanderers Football Club was a Scottish association football club based in the town of Kilsyth, North Lanarkshire.

== History ==
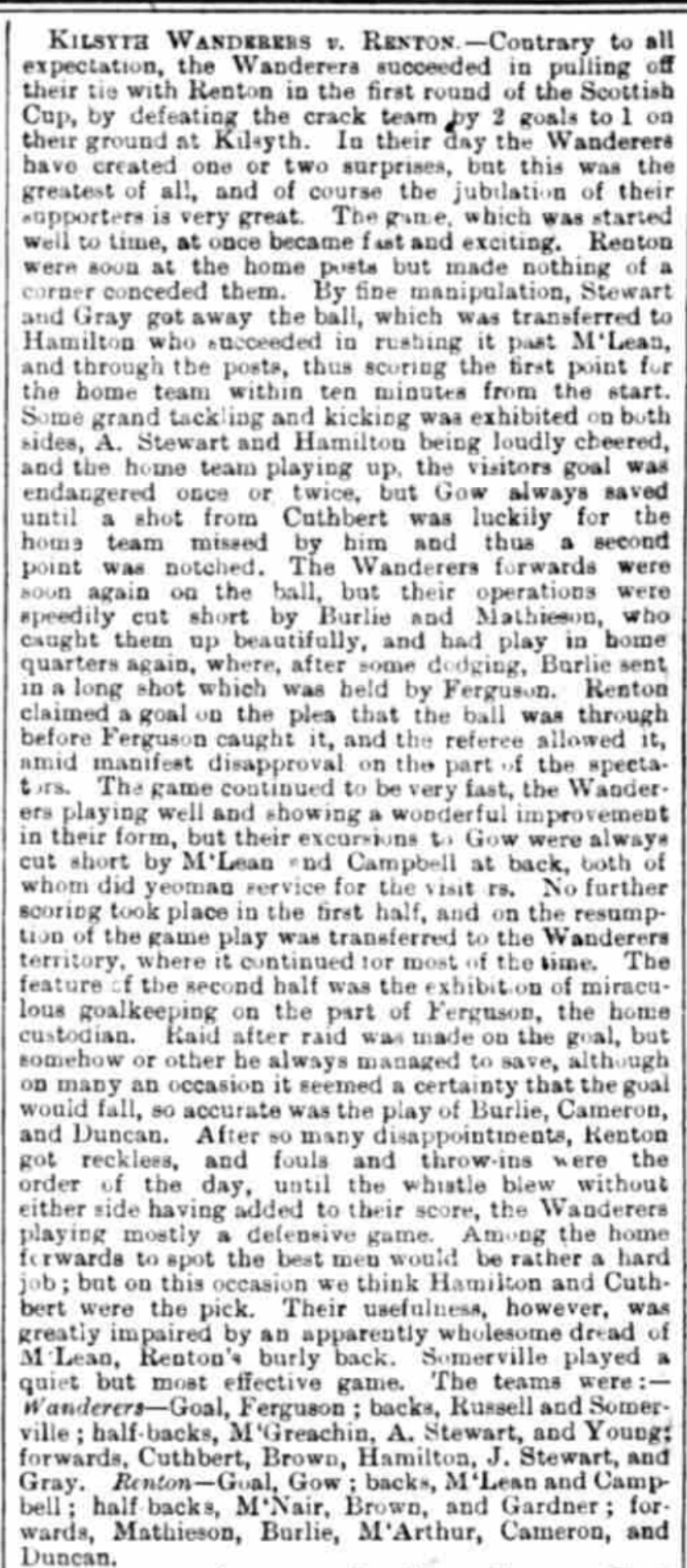
1890–91 Scottish Cup 1st Round, Kilsyth Wanderers 2–1 Renton, Falkirk Herald, 13 September 1890

The first reference to the club is of its hosting Milton of Campsie in August 1885, winning 6–5. The club's first competitive football came in the Stirlingshire Cup in the 1885–86 season, Wanderers losing to Longcroft in the first round.

In August 1887 the club joined the Scottish Football Association, making its Scottish Cup debut in 1887–88 with a defeat at Falkirk, William Hamilton scoring the Wanderers' consolation near the end after Falkirk goalkeeper Mitchell flapped at a cross. The club however improved and reached the semi-final of the Stirlingshire Cup for the first time in 1888–89, but lost to Slamannan, slightly against expectation.

=== Beating Renton ===
It struggled in its first Cup entries, only winning one tie in four seasons, but in the first round of the 1890–91 Scottish Cup, the club pulled off the biggest shock in the competition to date, and perhaps still the greatest shock in the competition's history. The club's opponent, Renton, had just become one of the founder members of the Scottish League and two years before claimed to be world champions, having won the 1888 Scottish Cup Final and then having beaten FA Cup winners West Bromwich Albion. Although Renton had lost many of its best players to professional sides, Kilsyth was not reckoned to be a challenge, with even the local media claiming that "they will not be surprised if they are beaten by a dozen goals, at the very least".

Nevertheless, the Wanderers turned around at half-time 2–1 to the good, and, despite being under siege for the whole of the second half, hung on for the win; a score so outlandish that "few could believe the evening papers". Renton protested on the basis of encroachment by the home spectators but the protest was dismissed on the technical grounds that the objection at the match had been made by Renton's umpire and not the club captain. One unintended consequence of the Wanderers' victory was that Renton arranged a friendly with the suspended St Bernard's in lieu of a second round fixture, which resulted in Renton's expulsion from the Scottish League.

=== Later Scottish Cup matches ===
The club reached the third round, coming from 3–0 down with half-an-hour remaining to beat Clydebank Athletic 5–3 in the second, thanks to inspirational play by captain Cuthbert, before the Vale of Leven pulled off the sort of result people expected Renton to inflict, beating the Wanderers 8–0 at Garrel Garden; all eight goals came in the second half.

From the 1891–92 season, a qualifying element was brought into the Scottish Cup, and the Wanderers only reached the first round proper once more; in 1898–99, by winning through to the fifth round of the Scottish Qualifying Cup (where the club lost to Wishaw Thistle. In the first round, the club had a plum draw at home to Queen's Park, but switched the tie to Hampden Park, and Queen's won 4–0.

=== Local leagues and cups ===
The club came close to winning the Stirlingshire Cup in 1892–93, taking the lead in the final at Brockville against East Stirlingshire and, with the scores at 1–1 in the second half, the Shire was reduced to ten men after Hastings was sent off for kicking a Wanderer; but, despite playing the better football, the Wanderers conceded a winner with four minutes remaining.

With the rise of league competitions in the 1890s, the club sought to join the Midland League, being turned down for membership in 1893–94, but was finally admitted in 1895–96. The club also reached the final of the Stirlingshire in the latter season, playing Falkirk at Merchiston Park, and took the lead in the first minute when Brown finished off a counter-attack, but by half-time the local side was 3–1 up, and with luck going against the Wanderers (including hitting a post just before the break), Falkirk scored three breakaway goals in the second half for a flattering 6–1 scoreline.

The club played in the Midland League, and its successor competition (the Central Football Combination), until 1899–1900, finishing between third and fifth in the competition.

=== End of the club ===
In 1899–1900 the club was forced to withdraw from the Central Combination after playing 9 games for financial reasons; one problem was the difficulty in securing fixtures or availability as the town was not close to a railway station. The club's last match in the Combination, and last recorded match in toto, was a 2–1 defeat at home to Falkirk in on 24 March 1900.

Despite this withdrawal the club was still ranked 6th in the 9-team competition, but at the end of the season it was expelled from the competition for non-payment of subscription and visiting clubs' guarantees. One of the club's players, P. Heenan, had already been banned sine die for on-pitch brutality, the ban coming soon after a 7-month suspension had ended. Most of the club's players left for other clubs over the summer of 1900, and, although an entry was made for the Qualifying Cup in 1900–01, no team could be got together, and the club scratched to Stenhousemuir so late that the Warriors were able to put in a claim for expenses. However the club apparently had no money, not renewing its subscription to the Stirlingshire FA in October 1900. Oddly, the club was not struck from the Scottish FA register before the 1901–02 season, apparently to give the club one last chance for resurrection, and it was entered for the Qualifying Cup draw in August, although it was claimed that was because "someone has blundered". The club was again drawn to face Stenhousemuir but this time scratched in good time. The coup de grâce for the club, which had not played a match since 1900, was its striking from the Scottish FA register in April 1902.

== Colours ==
The club played in black and white vertically striped shirts with blue knickers.

== Ground ==
The club played at Garrel Garden, described as "primitive" and "rough and ridgy".

== Notable players ==
- John Patrick, later a Scottish international
- Alex Drain, who represented the Dumbartonshire FA and Stirlingshire FA, who occasionally turned out for Celtic in friendly matches, and who died of injuries from a broken spine after a mining accident in 1897
- Tom McAteer, later a Scottish Cup winner with Celtic
- James Cleland, who joined the club in 1898 after a professional career

== Honours ==
- Stirlingshire Cup
  - Runner-up: 1892–93, 1895–96
- Kilsyth Charity Cup
  - Winner: 1889–90, 1890–91 (the club was compelled to withdraw from the competition the next season because of its representation on the charity committee)
