= Grangemouth F.C. =

Association football club in Falkirk, Scotland

Grangemouth
- Full name: Grangemouth Football Club
- Nickname: the Portonians
- Founded: 1886
- Dissolved: 1894
- Ground: Muirhead Park, Grangemouth (1886–1888) Caledonian Park, Grangemouth (1888–1894)
Home colours

Grangemouth Football Club was a Scottish association football club based in the town of Grangemouth. The club was founded in 1886 and disbanded eight years later in 1894.

== History ==
Grangemouth Football Club was founded in 1886, possibly the second club from the town of Grangemouth to bear the name.^{[note 1]}

Grangemouth first entered in the Scottish Cup in the 1887–88 season. In the first round the club was drawn against East Stirlingshire from the nearby village of Bainsford and lost the match 5–2. For the following two seasons, Grangemouth was drawn against Slamannan in the first round; losing 5–3 in 1888 but winning 8–0 a year later to progress to the second round for the first time. Grangemouth went on to beat Camelon and Kilsyth Wanderers before losing to eventual finalists Vale of Leven in the fourth round.

The club's best performance in local competition was reaching the Stirlingshire Cup final in 1891, not conceding a goal until the final; however East Stirlingshire proved too strong, with a 4–1 win over Grangemouth on neutral ground at Camelon. It last competed in the Scottish Cup in 1894. Grangemouth also competed in regional competitions such as the Stirlingshire Cup and Midland Football League. The club finished 3rd (out of 9) in the first season (1891–92) of the latter, but failed re-election after finishing bottom in 1892–93.

== Colours ==
The club wore blue and white vertical striped jerseys and blue knickers, serge blue being the available shade for the latter.

== Ground ==
The club was based at Muirhead Park until 1888 when it moved to Caledonian Park where it remained until 1894.

== Honours ==
- Stirlingshire Cup:
  - Runners-up (1): 1890–91

== Records ==
=== Scottish Cup ===
- First Scottish Cup match: v East Stirlingshire, 3 September 1887
- Highest winning margin (eight goals): 8–0 v Slamannan, 7 September 1889
- Highest losing margin (six goals): 8–2 v East Stirlingshire, 6 September 1890; 7–1 v Vale of Leven, 9 November 1889; 7–1 v Renton, 25 November 1893

== Notes ==
^1. Another club from the town called Zetland F.C., which existed between 1882 and 1885, was possibly the same team as one referred to as Grangemouth.
