= Slamannan F.C. =

Former association football club in Scotland

Slamannan
- Full name: Slamannan Football Club
- Nicknames: the Loch, the Mining Lads, the Colliers
- Founded: 1886
- Dissolved: 1902
- Ground: Barnsmuir
Home colours

Slamannan Football Club was a Scottish association football club based in the village of Slamannan, Stirlingshire.

== History ==
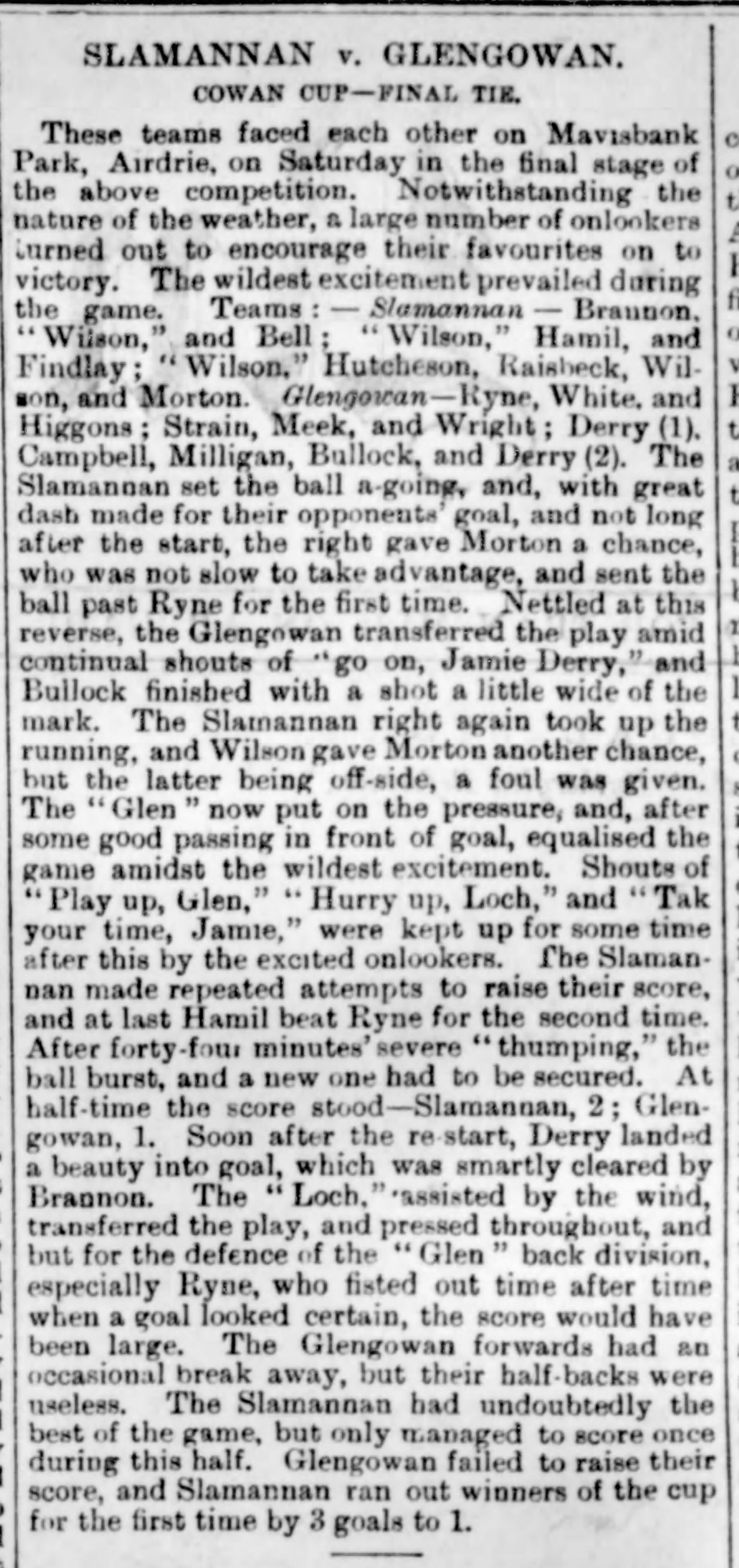
1891 Cowan Cup Final, Slamannan 3–1 Glengowan, Rutherglen Reformer, 8 May 1891

The club was founded in 1886, and was made up entirely of miners.

The club competed in the Scottish Cup for five seasons between 1886 and 1890 as well as the regional Stirlingshire Cup competition. The club reached the second round of the national cup in four of its five entries, but never the third.

Slamannan's best run in the Stirlingshire Cup was in 1888–89, when it reached the final, but lost 7–0 to East Stirlingshire in the final at Victoria Park in Camelon. The same season, Slamannan suffered its biggest Scottish Cup defeat. Having beaten Grangemouth in the first round, the club drew 3–3 against King's Park in the second, surrendering a 3–1 lead in the last ten minutes of the game, but lost 13–1 away in the replay, the club's kick and rush style not working on a better quality pitch.

In 1890–91, the last time the club played in the Scottish Cup proper, the club looked like it had reached the third round for the first time, beating Clydebank 5–3, with all of the scores being registered in the same goal. However Clydebank protested that the goals had been the wrong height at one end and the Bankies won the re-played tie.

The club had more problems with its ground later in the season, in the Stirlingshire Cup quarter-final with East Stirlingshire. The first attempt at the tie saw the referee declare the pitch unplayable, and the clubs played out a 2–2 draw as a friendly instead. The following week, on the morning of the rescheduled game, Slamannan telegraphed East Stirlingshire and the referee to say the ground was in a worse condition, but East Stirlingshire and the referee attended regardless, and the referee declared the pitch playable. As Slamannan had not turned up, E.S. claimed the tie, but, 40 minutes after the scheduled kick-off time, a Slamannan XI was assembled and went 5–1 up with ten minutes to go, when the referee called the tie off for bad light. The Stirlingshire FA ordered the tie to be played off again at Barnsmuir, E.S. this time winning the tie 4–3.

Slamannan did at least have the minor consolation of winning the Cowans' Cup, a four-team tournament presented by a furniture company to clubs in the Slamannan district. Slamannan retained the trophy the following season but scratched to Slamannan Rovers in the tournament's final.

From 1891–92, the Scottish Football Association introduced preliminary rounds to the national cup, and the club never reached the first round proper again. In the 1891–92 Stirlingshire Cup, the club lost in the first round to Slamannan Rovers, and the club stopped entering the competition.

From 1896 to 1898 the club became a Junior club so was ineligible for the senior competitions; in 1898, the club returned to Senior football, and entered the new Scottish Qualifying Cup; however it scratched in 1899–1900 before playing a tie, lost 7–0 to Clackmannan in 1900–01, and in 1901–02 scratched when drawn against the Wee County again. The club had reached the semi-final of the Stirlingshire Cup in 1898–99, and lost to Falkirk Amateurs in the final of the Consolation Cup, but it did not play in the competition afterwards.

The club seems to have ceased operations that season, and was struck off the Scottish FA's register in April 1902.

== Colours ==
The club wore the following;

- 1886–87: scarlet and royal blue jerseys with white knickers
- 1887–88: black, scarlet, and blue hooped jerseys with white knickers
- 1888–90: red and white vertical striped shirts with blue knickers
- 1891–99: white shirts, blue knickers

== Ground ==
The club's first ground was West Limerigg Park. In 1889 it moved to Castleburn Park at Barnsmuir.

West Limerigg was described as "peculiar", being more of cinder than grass, its shape dictated by a right of way running through it, and difficult to reach, requiring a 9-mile wagon journey from Falkirk railway station. Castleburn also sometimes had to have ash laid on it to provide a footing in poor weather.
