= Gairdoch F.C. =

Former association football club in Scotland

Gairdoch
- Full name: Gairdoch Football Club
- Nickname(s): the Light Blues, the Gaira
- Founded: 1886
- Dissolved: 1896
- Ground: Carronshore
- Chairman: Andrew Bell; Secretary: Joe Begg
Home colours

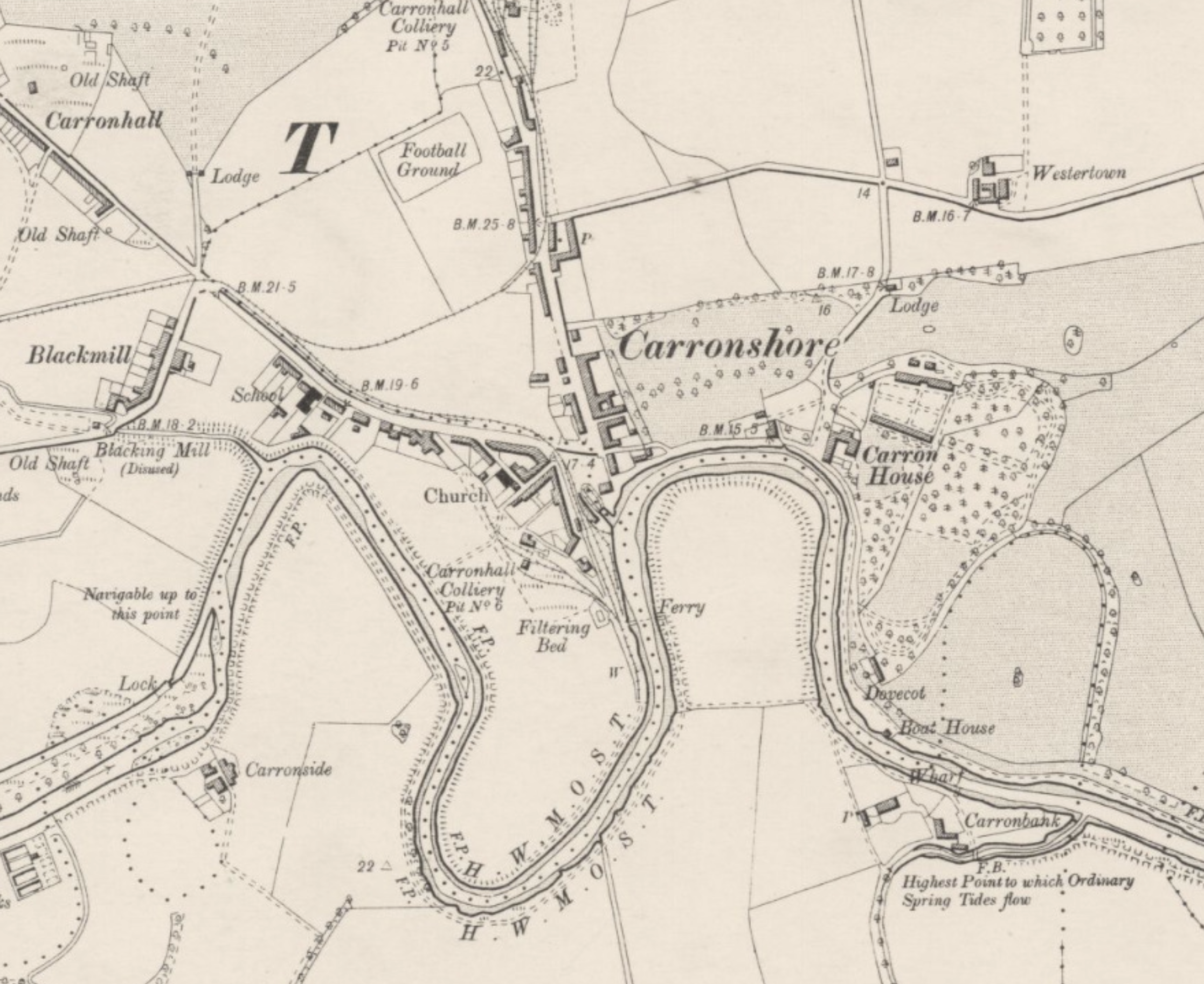
Ordnance Survey Stirlingshire Sheet XXIV.SE, surveyed in 1896, showing the Gairdoch ground location

Gairdoch Football Club was a Scottish association football club based in the village of Carronshore, Stirlingshire.

== History ==
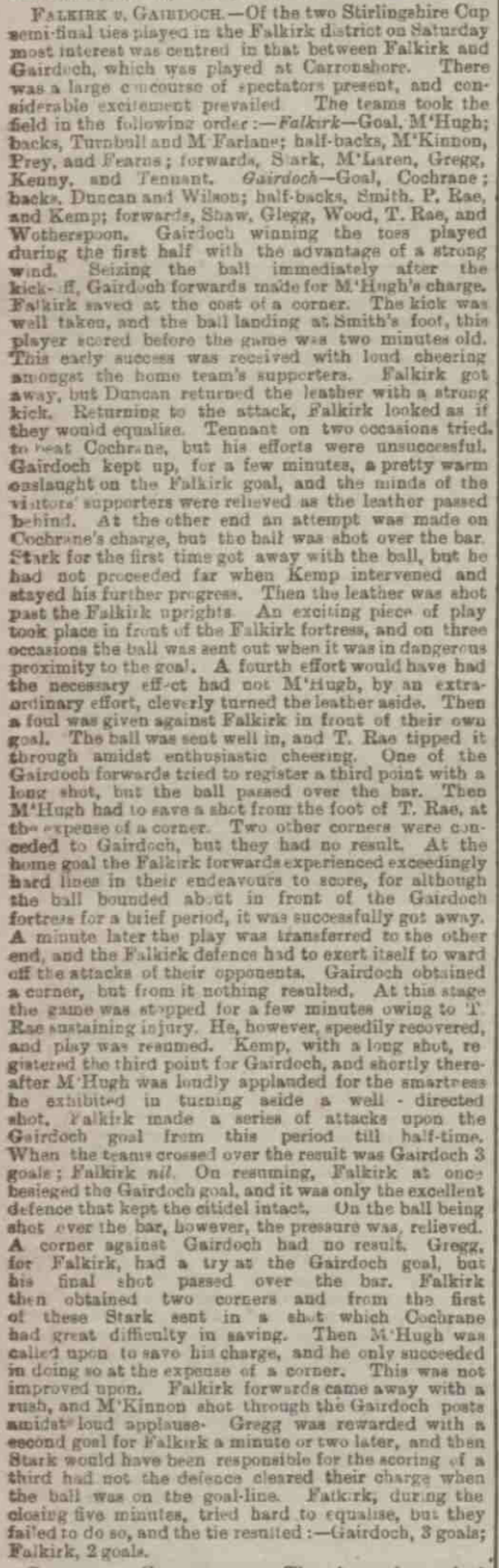
1893–94 Stirlingshire Cup semi-final, Gairdoch 3–2 Falkirk, Falkirk Herald, 24 January 1894

The club was founded in 1886. Its first competitive match was in the 1886–87 Stirlingshire Cup and was a 9–0 win over the Olympic club of Stirling, who blamed a new goalkeeper who "only stopped the shots that were going past".

Gairdoch was one of 35 new members to the Scottish Football Association in 1888, alongside Celtic. The club entered the Scottish Cup from 1888–89 without any success - it lost its three ties in the main rounds and, once qualifying rounds had been introduced from 1891 to 1892, never won through to the main competition. The club got to the final preliminary round in 1892–93 and 1893–94, a 3–1 defeat by King's Park in the former year being the closest the club managed to winning through.

The club was however quite a force at a local level. It surprised everyone by reaching the Stirlingshire Cup final in 1889–90, beating Alva 3–2 in the semi-final, all of the goals coming in the first half, and Alva's protest about rough play was dismissed. Falkirk was far too strong in the final, at East Stirlingshire's Bainsford ground, 2,000 spectators seeing the Bairns stroll home 9–0.

The club also reached the final again in 1893–94, gaining a measure of revenge over Falkirk with a 3–2 semi-final win, nearly throwing away a 3–0 lead and only a last-minute goal-line clearance securing the win. Having beaten final opponents East Stirlingshire in a friendly earlier in the season, Gairdoch was hopeful of winning the trophy, but the original tie at Brockville had to be postponed because of the cut-up state of the pitch, and the sides played a 70-minute friendly instead, E.S. winning 2–1, and the sides enjoying dinner together afterwards. For the final itself, Gairdoch was handicapped by illness forcing it to make a change, and thanks to injuries to P. Rae and Honeyman, finished the match with 9 men; the Shire ended up winning 5–0.

The club's misfortune in finals continued in the Falkirk Charity Cup later that season. Gairdoch gained revenge over East Stirlingshire in the semi-final and met Falkirk in the final; the game ended 0–0, with the Bairns having a goal disallowed for offside, but the replay at Camelon was one-way traffic, Falkirk repeating its crosstown rival's 5–0 win.

Gairdoch did however have one piece of good news at the end of the season, being elected to the Scottish Midland League in place of the moribund Bridge of Allan. Unfortunately this came after East Stirlingshire and Falkirk had both been established as members, and both turned professional, thus enabling the clubs to take players from Gairdoch; in its two seasons of membership, Gairdoch finished bottom both times, only winning 3 matches in 30, one of which - a 5–2 win over Alloa Athletic - was the club's first match in the competition. The club's final match in the competition was a 5–2 defeat to East Stirlingshire in May 1896; the club did not seek re-election at the end of the season.

Gairdoch did enter the Scottish Cup for 1896–97, but scratched to Alloa Athletic, and the formal end for the club was being struck from the local association's register in October. The final indignity was having to face a claim from King's Park for wasted expenses for a cancelled match. The Gairdoch name was kept alive by a Junior side.

== Colours ==
The club originally played in broad black and white hooped shirts and white knickers. In 1889 it changed to light blue jerseys and black knickers, the knickers later described simply as "dark" and the shirts from 1894 as royal blue.

== Ground ==
The club's ground was originally named Grahamston. From 1890 the location was given simply as Carronshore. The ground was off Main Street to the north of the village, in the location now known as Gairdoch Park.
