= Laurieston F.C. =

Former association football club in Stirlingshire, Scotland

Laurieston
- Full name: Laurieston Football Club
- Founded: 1884
- Dissolved: 1895
- Ground: Zetland Park
Home colours

Laurieston Football Club was a Scottish association football club based in the village of Laurieston, Stirlingshire. The club was founded in 1884 and disbanded in 1895. The club competed in the Scottish Cup for five seasons between 1886 and 1890 as well as the regional Stirlingshire Cup competition. From 1891 onwards, the club's home colours were amber and black vertical striped shirts with navy blue shorts.
