= Campsie F.C. =

Former association football club in Scotland

Campsie
- Full name: Campsie Football Club
- Founded: 1883
- Dissolved: 1894
- Ground: Lennox Park
- President: Captain King
- Hon. Secretary: Thos. Roger
- Match Secretary: John Millar Jr
1883–91 colours	1891–94 colours

Campsie Football Club was a Scottish association football club based in the village of Lennoxtown, Stirlingshire.

== History ==
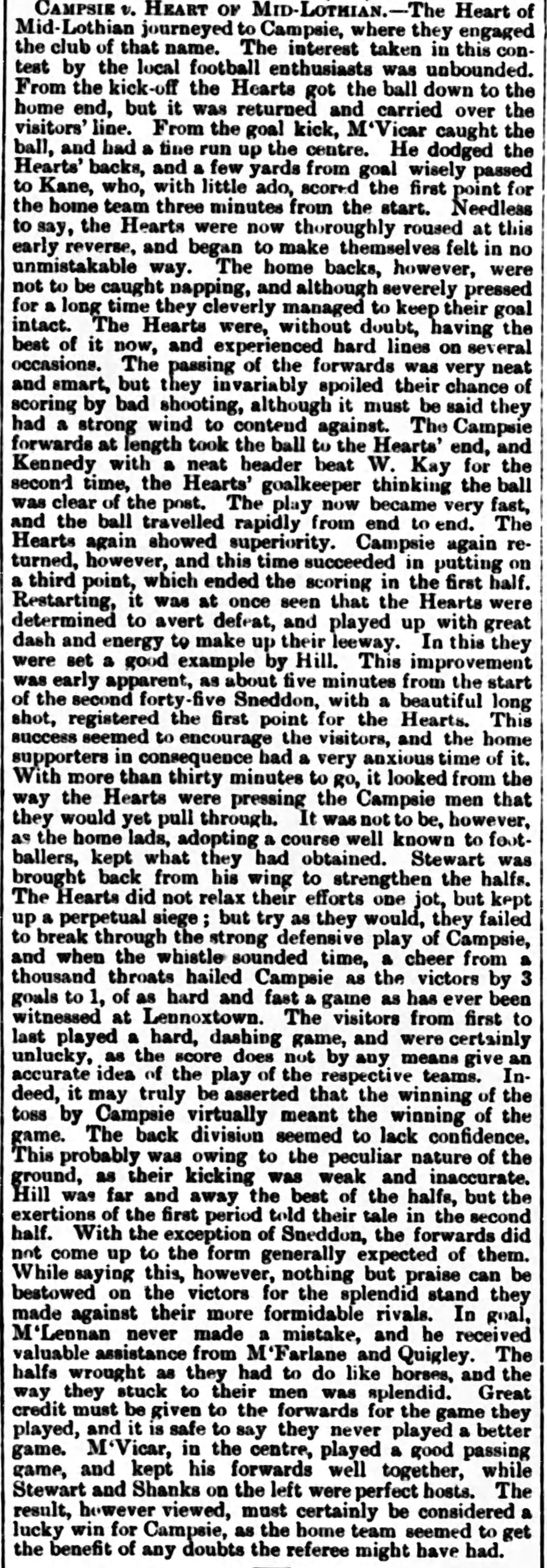
1888–89 Scottish Cup Fourth Round, Campsie 3–1 Heart of Midlothian, Stirling Observer, 8 November 1888

The club was founded in 1883, with the club's initial honorary and match secretaries living in Crosshill Terrace in Lennoxtown. Honorary secretary Thomas Rodger had held the same role with Campsie Glen, one of the previous senior clubs in the town, and the club took over Campsie Glen's Lennox Park ground. The club promptly joined the Scottish Football Association and made its Scottish Cup bow a month later.

=== First Stirlingshire Cup final ===
The club went out in the first round, but later that season was a founder member of the Stirlingshire Association and played in the first Stirlingshire Cup in 1883–84; it had more success in the local tournament, reaching the semi-final, only losing 2–1 to a Falkirk side able to call on the resources of a membership over three times as large - the Campsie side "exhibited the passing game as few clubs in the shire can do". The success stimulated the revival of another senior club in the town (Central) in 1884.

The club went one stage further in 1884–85, reaching the final by beating the two largest teams in the county; King's Park 1–0 away from home in a replay, thanks to an early goal from Alex Stewart, with Campsie having to run a gauntlet of King's Park's younger supporters throwing dirt at their carriage back to the station, and East Stirlingshire in a semi-final replay. The win over the Shire was particularly sweet, the 5–1 score avenging a defeat in the first round of the 1884–85 Scottish Cup. Although favoured in the final against Camelon, who had had a far easier run in the competition and relied on a protest to overturn an earlier defeat, Camelon won 2–1 after extra time in a second replay. Campsie protested that a goal was wrongly disallowed after the Camelon team dragged their goalkeeper Nisbet - with the ball - to the side of the goal during a scrimmage, but to no avail.

Campsie's local form had not been repeated in the Scottish Cup, not winning a tie until 1886–87, when it put double figures past Dunipace in the first round, and put up a tremendous fight at Vale of Leven in the third round, only losing 7–4; Campsie even took the lead, and although the club went 6–1 down, it pulled back to 6–4 with ten minutes to go, before the Vale made the game safe - the Campsie performance having such "dash and judgment" that the Vale supporters started to cheer Campsie on. The match saw Vale play a 2–3–5 formation against Campsie's regular 2–2–6, despite the new formation being criticized for its defensiveness.

=== Scottish Cup quarter-final ===
The club's best Scottish Cup run came in 1888–89, with the club reaching the quarter-final; ironically it proved to be deleterious for the club, as following the season it suffered a number of departures as players were poached by quasi-professional or English clubs, star forward William Dempsey for instance moving to Hibernian. The highlight of the run was a 3–1 win over Heart of Midlothian, but in the quarter-final the 3rd L.R.V. proved too strong, Alex Kain scoring the only Campsie goal in a 6–1 defeat at Cathkin Park.

=== Stirlingshire Cup win ===
The introduction of qualifying rounds from 1891–92 meant that Campsie had to win through to play in the first round proper, and the club only did so in 1892–93, suffering a heavy defeat in the first round proper to Motherwell. The previous season however saw the club win the Stirlingshire Cup for the only time, beating Falkirk 4–1 in the final at King's Park's Forthbank ground; inside-left Smith opening the scoring and Pattison making it two, before the Bairns pulled one back with a "very suspicious offside goal", before two second-half goals made the game safe. Captain Macfarlane and striker Danny McVicar both decided to retire after the match.

=== End of club ===
Falkirk gained revenge over Campsie in the second round of the Stirlingshire Cup in 1892–93; Campsie won the tie, but Falkirk's protest that a Campsie player was barred because of an appearance in an Army Cup tie meant the tie replayed, this time Falkirk winning out. Campsie in turn protested Falkirk for alleged professionalism, but withdrew the protest because of lack of proof, and Campsie did not play competitive football again.

Campsie entered the Scottish Cup in 1893–94, but scratched to Camelon in the first qualifying round. The club's final demise came in 1894, along with fellow Stirlingshire senior sides Vale of Bannock, Denny, and Bridge of Allan, as professionalism - with reliance on gate money - meant the clubs in smaller towns could no longer compete with clubs with bigger catchment areas and league placings.

== Colours ==
The club's home colours were dark blue jerseys and knickers, with red socks, until 1890 when they changed to light blue, first wearing them against Dalmuir Thistle in August.

== Ground ==
The club originally played at Lennox Park, in the east end of the village, half a mile from Lennoxtown station and 1¼ miles from Campsie railway station, and using the High Street for changing facilities. By 1889 the club was playing at the Alum Works Park, which during the summer was the home of the Campsie cricket club.

== Honours ==
- Stirlingshire Cup
  - Winner: 1891–92
  - Runner-up: 1884–85

== Notable players ==
- Quintin Macfarlane, full-back and captain of the club through the 1880s, and in the Stirlingshire Cup triumph, who was often "borrowed" by other clubs when there was no clash with a Campsie fixture, and who represented the Stirlingshire FA in county matches.
- Joe McQue, half-back, who played in the Stirlingshire Cup win in 1892
