= Stirlingshire Cup =

- Founded: 1883
- Region: Stirlingshire
- Teams: 6
- Current champions: Falkirk
- Most championships: Falkirk (34 titles)

The Stirlingshire Cup is an association football cup competition for clubs in the counties of Stirlingshire, Clackmannanshire & Dunbartonshire, Scotland. The competition was founded in 1883 and was contested annually by senior member clubs of the Stirlingshire Football Association until the 2014-15 tournament. The cup returned under a new group stage format for the 2024-25 season, with Championship side Falkirk crowned champions for the 33rd time in a 5-1 win over League Two side Stirling Albion.

== Format ==
Previously the competition was a knock-out tournament contested by the six member clubs of the Stirlingshire Football Association. In the first round draw, two teams receive byes into the semi-final with the remaining four clubs paired against each other. The winners of the two first round matches progress to the semi-final and the losers are eliminated from the tournament.

In season 2024–25 a group stage was introduced with the winners of group 1 (Alloa Athletic, East Stirlingshire & Stirling Albion) playing the winners of group 2 (Dumbarton, Falkirk & Stenhousemuir) in the final.

For 2025-26, the competition was a pre-season tournament. There were two round robin group stages held at the Falkirk Stadium and Ochilview Park on the 21st of June. The final was held on the 24th of June at the Falkirk Stadium. Group A matches were held at Ochilview Park between Stenhousemuir, Dumbarton and Stirling Albion. Group B matches were held at Falkirk Stadium between Falkirk, Alloa Athletic and East Stirlingshire. Group games were to be 60 minutes instead of 90, and went straight to penalties in the event of a draw. Falkirk won the final, beating Stenhousemuir 3-1.

Participating teams (2025–26)

- Alloa Athletic
- Dumbarton
- East Stirlingshire
- Falkirk
- Stenhousemuir
- Stirling Albion

== History ==
The Stirlingshire Cup tournament commenced in the 1883–84 football season as a competition for member clubs of the newly created Stirlingshire Football Association which was founded on 25 December 1883. The original meeting to form the organisation was held in Larbert and was attended by representatives from seven football clubs: Campsie, Dunipace, East Stirlingshire, Falkirk, King's Park, Stenhousemuir and Tayavalla. The first tournament began in January 1884 and was contested by the seven original attendees of the meeting as well as seven other clubs from Stirlingshire: Comely Park, Grahamston, Grasshoppers, Milngavie, Ochil Rangers, Strathblane and Vale of Bannock. The inaugural tournament was won by Falkirk who defeated East Stirlingshire 3–1 in a final replay after an initial 1–1 draw.

== Performance by club ==
Final appearances

Club	Winners	Last final won	Runners-up	Last final lost
Falkirk	34	2025–26	17	2012–13
East Stirlingshire	21	2000–01	17	2014–15
Dumbarton	16	2012–13	6	2011–12
Stirling Albion	14	2005–06	12	2013–14
Alloa Athletic	14	1996–97	20	2000–01
Stenhousemuir	11	2014–15	20	2009–10
King's Park	4	1914–15	5	1938–39
Clydebank	2	1979–80	8	1996–97
Camelon	2	1897–98	4	1901–02
Campsie	1	1891–92	1	1884–85
Gairdoch	0	—	2	1893–94
Kilsyth Wanderers	0	—	2	1895–96
Bo'ness	0	—	2	1927–28
Grangemouth	0	—	1	1890–91
Slamannan	0	—	1	1888–89
Falkirk Amateurs	0	—	1	1928–29
