= East Lanarkshire F.C. =

Former association football club in Scotland

- Full name: East Lanarkshire Football Club
- Nickname(s): the E.L., the Shire
- Founded: 1898
- Dissolved: 1900
- Ground: Hawthorn Park
- Secretary: R. Finlay
Home colours

East Lanarkshire F.C. was an association football club from Harthill, Scotland, active in the late 19th century.

== History ==
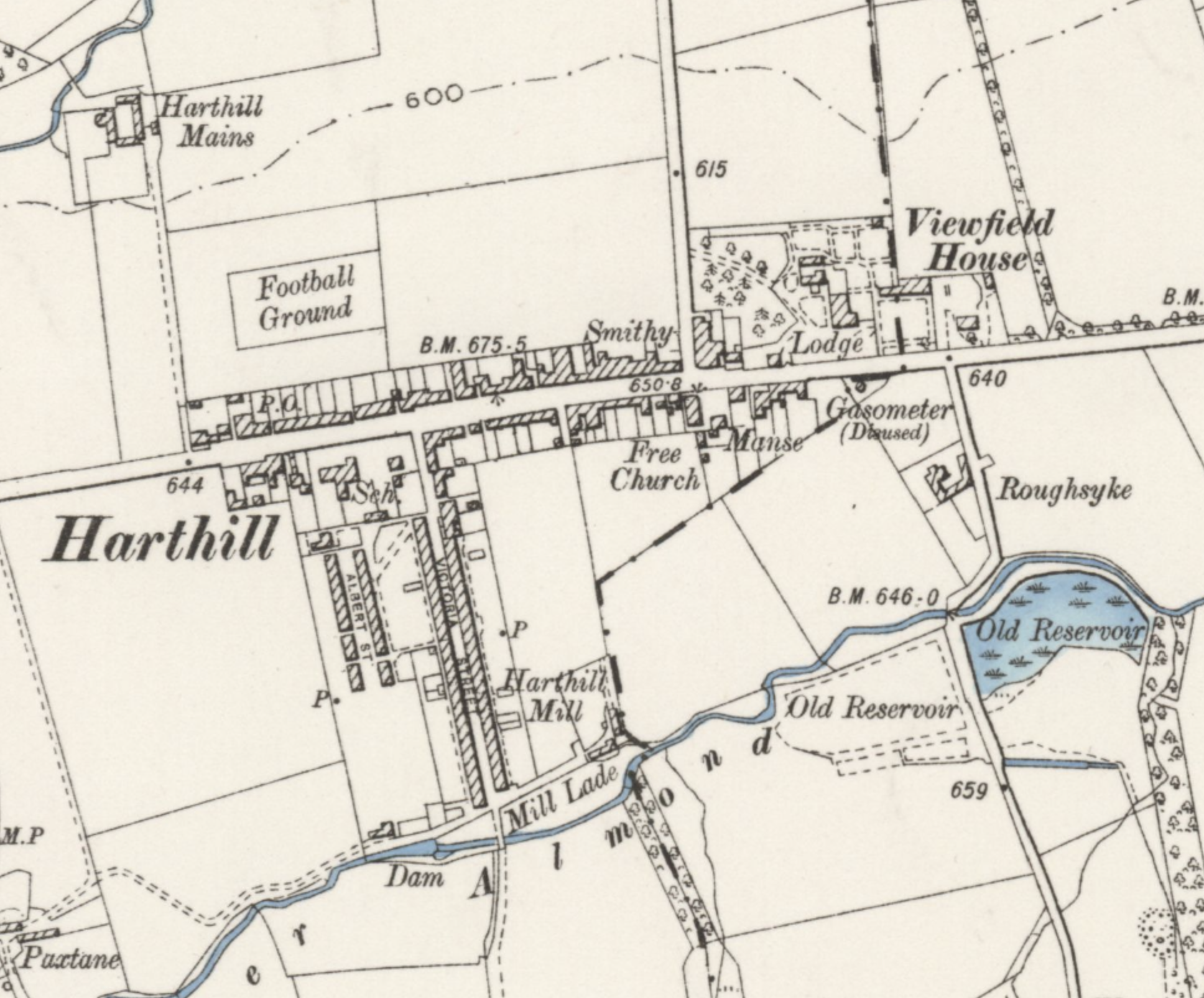
Harthill in 1899

The first East Lanarkshire F.C. was formed as a merger between the Shotts Football Club and the East Lanarkshire Cricket Club in 1876, but the merger either fell apart or was never fully "consummated" as Shotts F.C. continued to play afterwards under the Shotts name.

The instant East Lanarkshire was a separate entity, formed in Harthill, Lanarkshire in April 1898, mostly with players from the recently defunct Harthill Thistle junior side, but also recruiting Dowker, Davidson, and Sommerville from Dykehead, and Sim and John Paterson from East Stirlingshire. Before the 1898–99 season started the club also recruited Bob Reid from Benhar, joined the Lanarkshire Association, and joined the Scottish Football Association, enabling it to play competitive football in the season.

=== First season ===
The club's first match was a 2–2 draw at Bonnybridge Grasshoppers, and its first tie in the Scottish Qualifying Cup was a near-impossible task at Linthouse; the home side won 6–2, the E.L. resorting to long shots. It had a little more fortune in the Lanarkshire Cup, beating Carfin Rovers in a first round replay; the original draw at Carfin was considered a "feather in the cap", and the E.L. exploited home advantage to the full - the Rovers were fatigued through travelling to Harthill by brake in windy conditions, which left the team not only unfit, but at a disadvantage in gauging the effect of the wind on an exposed and unfamiliar ground.

In the second round, the club was drawn at home to Airdrieonians, and offered to sell home advantage for £15. The tie was duly switched to Broomfield Park, and the E.L. startled the home support by equalizing an early goal thanks to a header from Graham, coming in from the left wing, and centre-forward Francis scoring a second equalizer just before half-time; with the second-half wind in their favour, the 'Onians were 5–2 ahead with 8 minutes to go, when the referee stopped the match because of darkness. However, as the early finish was due to the home side turning up late, the Lanarkshire FA unanimously agreed to order a replay, to take place at Harthill, which in effect robbed the E.L. of its £15, as the tie was deemed unplayed; even worse from a financial perspective, with no free time for a replay, and with the expenses of the tie likely to exceed a gate share, Airdrieonians scratched from the competition.

The small consolation was that the E.L. was in the last 4, and entertained Albion Rovers, but put in its "worst display...in their short career", and went down 4–1; demonstrating the economic realities of a smaller club in such a competition, the total receipts were £2 8/-, which suggests a crowd of under 100, but, despite the amount not covering the Rovers' travel expenses, the Coatbridge side had nothing but praise for the Shire's sporting attitude.

The club however was able to enter the Coatbridge Express Cup, and after walking over Hamilton Academical (whose Lanarkshire League commitments precluded it from playing the tie) and beating Carfin Rovers 2–0 the club reached the final against Wishaw Thistle, played at the Acas' Douglas Park; the club prepared with an unexpected 1–0 win in a friendly against East Stirlingshire. The final ended 1–1, the E.L. considered by most spectators to have been unlucky as the Jags' goal was considered offside by a distance. The replay, at Fir Park, ended 2–2; the E.L. squandered a two-goal half-time lead and missed a penalty when still a goal ahead, before conceding an equalizer in the 86th minute. It was third time unlucky for the E.L., without Graham for the second replay (again at Fir Park) due to an accident at work; despite taking the lead before the break, the club went down 3–1.

However, even in the club's first couple of months of playing, it was obvious that the smaller senior clubs in the region were finding it difficult to attract other senior clubs for matches. This was made harder by the bigger clubs in the shire forming the Lanarkshire Football League in October 1898, which required a £10 guarantee for visiting clubs, well beyond the capabilities of the smaller clubs. A smaller Second League was held in the second half of the 1898–99 season, with E.L, Dykehead, Uddingston, Glengowan, and Carfin as members, but it seems to have fizzled out by the end of April.

=== Last season ===
Mr Finlay promised that the E.L. would come back stronger for 1899–1900, signing up 13 players before the summer had even started, and the club seemed to demonstrate this with a hard-fought 2–0 win over Dykehead in the Qualifying Cup first round. However the vagaries of the wind at Longriggend proved too much for the Shire in the second.

The club narrowly lost to Royal Albert in the first round of the Lanarkshire, but was fancied to win at Dykehead in the quarter-final of the Coatbridge Express Cup, having more or less the same side as reached the final the previous season, while Dykehead, having lost its ground and having barely played, had to borrow a junior ground to host the tie. However the E.L. went down 8–1, which seems to have had a deleterious effect on the club, which barely played afterwards - its last recorded fixture is a 5–0 defeat at West Calder in April. It was struck from the Scottish FA roll in August 1900, at least three players joining West Calder, others joining Dykehead, and Graham joining the new East Benhar Rangers.

== Colours ==
The club wore blue and white shirts.

== Ground ==
The club's ground, Hawthorn Park, was to the north of a row of houses on Main Street and remains a football ground today. It was formerly the home of West Benhar, when it was called Harthill Mains.

== Notable players ==
- Billy Morrison, who later played in the Football League, and picked up a Scottish Cup runners-up medal when with Raith Rovers
