= Lanarkshire Football League =

Lanarkshire League
- Founded: 1898
- Abolished: 1901
- Region: Scotland
- Number of teams: 5
- Last champions: Albion Rovers (1st title)
- Most successful club(s): Albion Rovers (1 title); Motherwell (1 title)

The Lanarkshire Football League was a short-lived local football league in Scotland.

== History ==
The League was formed in 1898 in Scotland as one of several supplementary football leagues that were created in order to increase the number of fixtures for Scottish Football League clubs. The new league required home sides to pay a £10 guarantee for visiting clubs, which ensured that only the larger clubs could be members, as crowds of at least 400 were required just to cover the guarantee.

The league existed for only three seasons. Motherwell won the 1898–99 competition by defeating Airdrieonians in a very belated play-off in May 1900 and Albion Rovers the 1900–01 edition; the 1899–1900 edition was unfinished.

A Second League for smaller clubs was held in the second half of the 1898–99 season, but it seems to have fizzled out without completing - fixtures took second place to other competitions such as the Coatbridge Express Cup, and Glengowan was said to be "in a sorry state" by the end of April.

== Membership ==
- Airdrieonians 1898–1899, 1900-1901
- Albion Rovers 1898–1901
- Carfin Emmet 1899–1900
- Hamilton Academical 1898–1899, 1900–1901
- Motherwell 1898–1899, 1900–1901
- Royal Albert 1898–1900
- Wishaw 1899–1900
- Wishaw Thistle 1899–1900
- Wishaw United 1900–1901

=== Second League members ===
- Carfin Rovers
- Dykehead
- East Lanarkshire
- Glengowan
- Uddingston

== See also ==
- Scottish Football (Defunct Leagues)
