= Uddingston F.C. (1898) =

Uddingston
- Full name: Uddingston Football Club
- Founded: 1898
- Dissolved: 1901
- Ground: Meadowbank Park
- Secretary: Andrew D. Smith
Home colours

Uddingston Football Club was an association football club from Uddingston in Lanarkshire.

== History ==
The club was the third senior club from the town; its first record is of its joining the Scottish Football Association in August 1898. It was set up at a difficult time for clubs given the rise of the Scottish Football League and other similar league competitions. A Lanarkshire Football League was founded in October 1898, which required a £10 guarantee for visiting clubs, well beyond the capabilities of the smaller clubs. A smaller Second League was held in the second half of the 1898–99 season, with Uddingston as one of the five members, but it seems to have fizzled out by the end of April.

Uddingston was duly without any level of success. It entered the Lanarkshire Cup three times, from 1898–99 to 1900–01, as well as the Consolation Cup for clubs eliminated before the final; it played five times in the competition, losing four matches, with the exception being a 1–1 draw with Wishaw Thistle in the 1898–99 Consolation - a match which was both "fluky and uninteresting" and in which Uddingston had a goal disallowed.

It also entered the Scottish Qualifying Cup in 1898–99 and 1899–1900. In the former year, the club walked over Longriggend in the first round, and only lost 2–1 at Carfin in the second. In the latter, the club gained its only competitive victory, with a 7–1 win at Glengowan, despite the home side being ranked slight favourite, but the club lost again in the second round, this time 3–1 at Wishaw, hindered by one of its better players (Crichton) having to cry off after an injury received against Carfin Emmet. A protest against the Wishaw goalkeeper for being an "irregular" member was dismissed, Uddingston not learning from a failed protest by Wishaw Thistle against the same player after the first round.

The club was struck off the Scottish FA roll in August 1900. The club still technically existed, as it was entered in the Lanarkshire Cup and was drawn to receive a bye in the first round, and paired with Motherwell in the second, but the tie did not take place. The next Uddingston club was set up in 1910, but it was not a senior club, and the 1898 club remains the last senior club from the town.

== Colours ==
The club played in white.

== Ground ==
The club played at Meadowbank Park, as had its predecessor club.
