= Carfin Emmet F.C. =

Former association football club in Scotland

Carfin Emmet
- Nicknames: Emmet, the Dandy Row
- Founded: 1899
- Dissolved: 1908
- Ground: Byresknowes Park
- Secretary: John Breslin, B. Fern
Home colours

Carfin Emmet F.C., sometimes spelt Carfin Emmett, was an association football club from the village of Carfin in Lanarkshire.

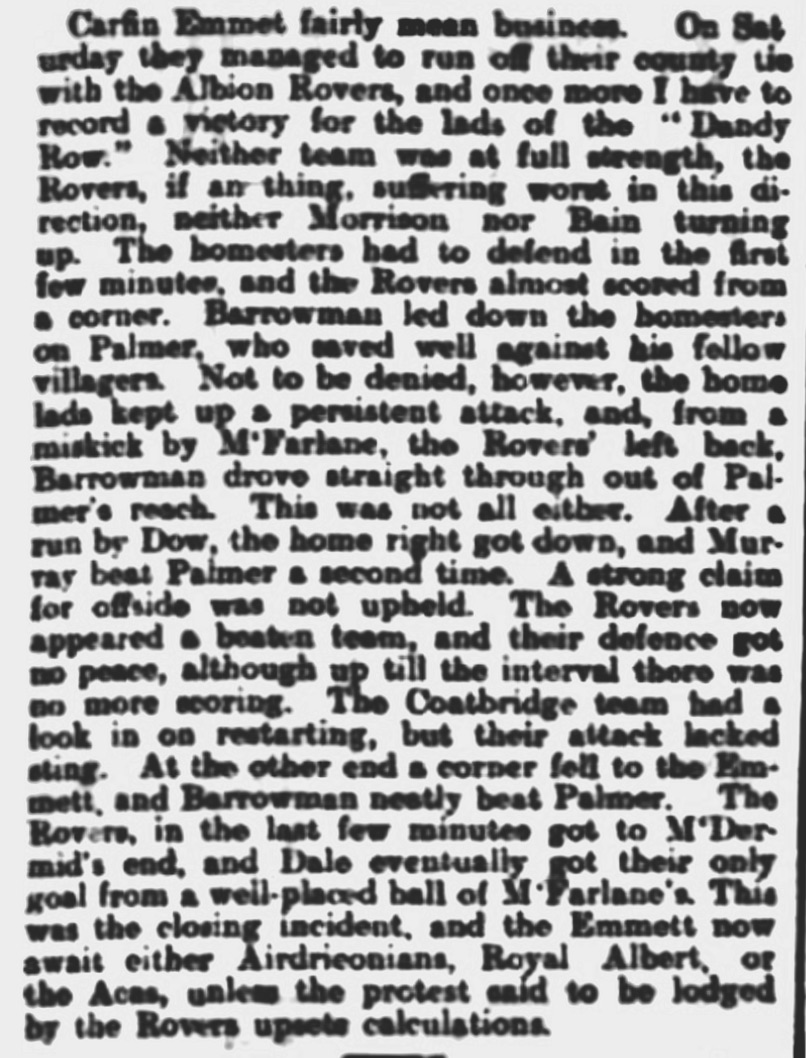
1900–01 Lanarkshire Cup 2nd Round, Albion Rovers 1–3 Carfin Emmet, Hamilton Herald, 1 March 1901

== History ==
The club (officially registered as Carfin Emmet) was a successor club to Carfin Shamrock F.C.; initial club secretary John Breslin had been a stalwart at Shamrock at the start of the decade. The name had been used by a Juvenile side in 1891, but the first record of the Emmet is from its joining the Scottish Football Association in August 1899. The club was formed as the result of a split at Carfin Rovers and both clubs claimed the use of the same ground. Rovers did not survive the split, although its club secretary tried to claim that Emmet had inherited Rovers' debts; after the Scottish FA investigated the matter and ruled the clubs were separate entities, the Carfin secretary's letter was "relegated to the waste paper basket without being read".

The new club's first match was a 3–2 win at Mossend Swifts in August and then beat Albion Rovers in the first round of the Scottish Qualifying Cup; Rovers protested on the basis that Emmet lacked a private ground, but sent a wire to the Scottish FA on the day of the committee meeting to withdraw it. Emmet drew twice with Motherwell in the second, but, whereas in previous years both clubs would have been put through to the third, the Scottish FA had changed the regulations, requiring a second replay, to take place at neutral ground (Hamilton). At the third time of asking, the Scottish League club won through 3–2, the winner coming ten minutes from the end.

The club also entered the Lanarkshire Cup for the first time in 1899–1900, losing to Wishaw Thistle in a first round replay, which saw Breslin and Thistle's M'Lelland ordered off for fighting; Emmet finished the tie with nine men after Smith was injured. The club's first wins in the competition came the following season, with a 5–1 win at Wishaw United and a 3–1 win at Albion Rovers. This took Emmet into the semi-final, but it lost 3–1 to Hamilton Academical, the Acas putting on a special train to take 500 supporters to the village.

The club played in the Lanarkshire League in 1899–1900, and the Midland League in 1903–04. Despite decent records in each competition - indeed the club had a slender chance of winning the Midland League when the competition was abandoned - the club only had one season in each. The Midland League was no longer considered a paying concern, and Emmet (amongst others) applied to join a revamped form of the Scottish Combination; many of the clubs ended up in the new Eastern League, but Emmet was not among them.

The club entered the Lanarkshire Cup every year until 1905–06, and the Qualifying Cup until 1907–08, but with increasingly diminishing returns; the club's final win in the Qualifying Cup was a 4–0 home victory over Longriggend in the first round in 1901–02, by which time "their ranks had been somewhat thinned", with half-back Clifford being tried out at centre-forward, and scoring one of the goals. The only other win it had in the Lanarkshire was over the soldier side of Hamilton Garrison in 1904–05, it being noted that Emmet had been inactive for most of the season. Even in that case, the referee stopped the game shortly after half-time owing to the state of the Carfin pitch, but, with Emmet 3–0 up at the time of abandonment, Garrison ceded the tie rather than force a replay. The financial struggle of trying to exist in an era of League football was shown by Emmet repeatedly switching Qualifying Cup ties in which it had been drawn at home to the "visiting" clubs, in return for a consideration; Albion Rovers paid £2 10s in 1902, and Clyde £8 in 1904.

The last reference to the club is of its scratching to Cartvale in the new Scottish Consolation Cup in January 1908. The name was revived by a short-lived Junior club in 1910, and, turning full circle, by Juvenile clubs in 1914 and 1926.

== Colours ==
The club played in green.

== Ground ==
The club's initial ground was Beechgrove Park, known for its narrowness; it was opened with a game against Wishaw in August 1899 and the biggest known attendance was 2–3,000 for the Qualifying Cup tie with Motherwell in September 1899.

It was lost to building work (probably the Lanarkshire Bridge Works) in 1903, but the club was able to secure Byresknowes Park, the traditional ground of Shamrock. By 1908 however it no longer had a private ground.

== Nickname ==
The club was sometimes known as the Dandy Row, after the street of miners' cottages that was the dominant feature in the village.

== Notable players ==
- James Hanning, who had played in the Football League for Sunderland
- Patrick Slavin, who had played for Celtic
- John Woodlock, who joined Aberdeen (1881) from Emmet in 1902
- Hughie Clifford, former Stoke regular, played for the club in the 1900s
