= Gaelic F.C. =

Gaelic
- Full name: The Gaelic Football Club
- Nickname: the Irishmen
- Founded: 1894
- Dissolved: 1895
- Ground: Cliftonhill
- Hon. Secretary: John Flood
- Match Secretary: Peter McGovern
Home colours

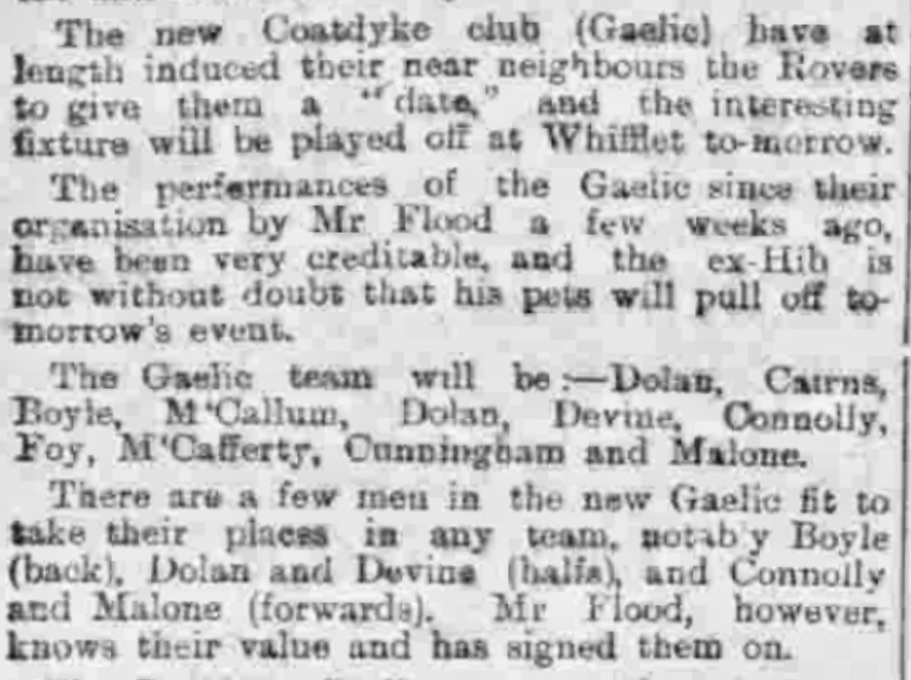
Gaelic F.C. side for a friendly with Albion Rovers F.C., Scottish Referee, 5 October 1894

The Gaelic Football Club was a short-lived association football club from Coatbridge in Lanarkshire, active briefly in the 1890s.

== History ==
The club was founded in August 1894 to be an Irish diaspora club in Coatdyke. The club's promoter, John Flood, had previously been a match secretary for Hibernian. There was confusion as a Mr Flood represented Airdrieonians on the Lanarkshire Association, but that was John's brother.

The club made its debut in the preliminary round of the 1894–95 Scottish Cup, having recruited Michael Dolan from Uddingston, and Foy and Trayner from Albion Rovers, and lost 3–2 at Airdriehill, the match notable for referee McClelland being injured by running into an Airdriehill player. In October, Gaelic made its Lanarkshire Cup debut, and caused a shock by beating the Cup holders Royal Albert, considered "such a surprise as has not taken place for years". However the Royalists protested on the basis that the goals were too wide; the protest was upheld, and a second Gaelic win did not count as the match referee did not turn up, so the game was played out as a 50-minute friendly. Only at the third time of asking could Gaelic make a win stick - by which time the aggregate score over the three games was 13–6.

The effort however in eliminating the bigger club seems to have taken its toll on the Gaelic, as in the next round at Motherwell the club was slaughtered 12–1, home advantage being considered the determining factor, and nine of the Motherwell goals coming in the second half; although the club was facing increasing issues with players being unable to get away from work, plus its ground being unavailable because of building operations. Gaelic protested about the size of the goals, but it was reckoned not to be a serious protest, made solely to needle the Lanarkshire FA with regard to the Royal Albert tie.

As a result of the difficulties in finding players and a playing surface, the club barely operated for most of the season. Despite this it was being touted as a likely member of the Scottish Football Alliance for the following season "provided they improve their playing pitch somewhat". The difficulties of operating against a backdrop of the Scottish League however were evident in the club's finances - a gate against Northern in February was a mere 19s and in March the club brought a claim against Dykehead before the Scottish Football Association for not receiving a £2 guarantee for a match with "no drawings [gate]".

In May, Gaelic was ordered to pay expenses to Hamilton Academical for failing to find a team for a Lanarkshire Consolation Cup tie, and, although the club entered the Scottish Qualifying Cup in 1895–96, this seems to have been something of a "flyer", given that a number of players had left for Albion Rovers. Drawn at home to Kilmarnock Athletic, Flood telegraphed the Ayrshire side offering to scratch from the tie for a consideration, and the Reds offered £2 10/, which he accepted; as membership of the Scottish FA was 5 shillings at the time, and Gaelic never played again, Flood had gained something of a last laugh.

== Colours ==
The club wore red and green striped jerseys and white knickers; in the context of the time, stripes usually referred to hoops.

== Ground ==
The club played at a ground called Cliftonhill, said to have been one of the former grounds of the original Airdrie and thus one of the oldest in Scotland. The ground appears to have been to the west of Cliftonhill House, so directly to the north of the current Cliftonhill ground. One reason behind the club's demise was that, at the start of the 1895–96 season, it was described as "unplayable".

== Notable players ==
- Peter Boyle, defender, who was being touted as ready to move to an English club (which turned out to be Sunderland) in February 1895
- Frank Dolan, former Celtic centre-half
- Michael Dolan, Celtic's first goalkeeper
