= Lanark F.C. =

Former association football club in Scotland

Lanark
- Full name: Lanark Football Club
- Nickname: the Upper Ward
- Founded: 1902
- Dissolved: 1904
- Ground: Spitland
- Match secretary: Alex. Bain
Home colours

Lanark F.C. was a Scottish football team, from the town of Lanark in Lanarkshire, which played in the Scottish Football Combination, a second-rank national league.

== History ==
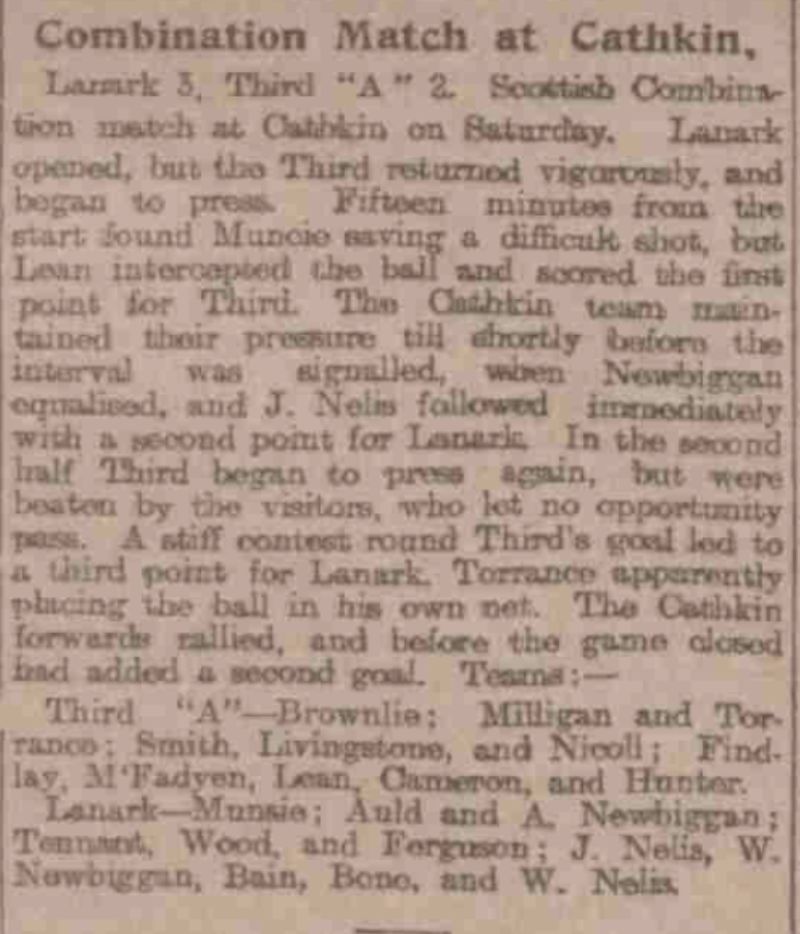
Lanark's only competitive win, from the Scottish Referee, 24 April 1903

The club was formed in 1902, under the auspices of Alex Bain, formerly of Wishaw United. The new club's first match was a 3–3 draw against Cartvale.

It was the third senior club of that name; the first Lanark F.C. had played one tie in the 1880–81 Scottish Cup, and the second had had one season in 1900–01.

Lanark had an unexpected chance to boost its profile when Wishaw United ran out of money towards the end of the 1902–03 season. Wishaw had played 11 out of 18 matches in the Scottish Combination, and, rather than expunging the fixtures, the Combination accepted Lanark's application to take over Wishaw's place, perhaps due to Bain's influence, despite a late application from Dykehead.

It was a bold move given that Lanark had no footballing record of which to speak and the Lanark side was "practically an untrained eleven". Its first tie in the Scottish Qualifying Cup in September 1902 had been a 5–1 defeat to Motherwell, and, although it was waiting to play in the semi-final of the Lanarkshire Cup at the time of admission, it had not played a tie, relying on Motherwell scratching to focus on the Scottish League and a bye to reach that stage.

The club had the further disadvantage that, although it took over Wishaw's place, it was not able to take over any of its players, unless they had played no more than 2 matches in the competition. Lanark's first result in the Combination was a 3–1 defeat at bottom-placed Vale of Leven and the club struggled, but was not humiliated, other than an 8–0 defeat at eventual champions Albion Rovers. It lost 5 of its 7 fixtures, earned a draw at St Mirren's A team, and beat 3rd Lanark's A team 3–1; the win was "scarcely the result anticipated" and "scarcely justified by the play".

The win at the Hi-Hi was the club's sole competitive win. It had lost its semi-final 7–0 at Hamilton Academical and was not re-elected to the Combination at the end of the season, which was considered an "ungrateful" action, put down to clubs from Dunbartonshire and Renfrewshire preferring their own.

The club had originally agreed to join the revived Midland Football League for 1903–04, but it evidently had problems securing both a ground and a team; it did not in fact participate in the competition, forfeited home advantage in the Qualifying Cup to Royal Albert and then played a friendly rather than the tie. At the start of 1904 Lanark also scratched from its first tie in the Lanarkshire Cup.

The last record of the club is an order that it pay expenses to Dykehead for scratching on the day of the scheduled Qualifying Cup match in 1904–05. The club did not enter the Lanarkshire Cup and appears to have disbanded.

== Colours ==
The club's colours were red and white.

== Ground ==
The club played at Spitland Park, described as having "peculiar gradients".
