= Wishaw Thistle =

Wishaw Thistle may refer to:

- Wishaw Thistle F.C., a defunct Scottish association football club from Wishaw in Scotland
- Wishaw F.C., a Scottish association football club known as Wishaw Thistle from 1906 until the 1920s
