= Carfin Rovers F.C. =

Former association football club in Scotland

Carfin Rovers
- Nickname(s): Rovers, the Dandy Dandy
- Founded: 1897
- Dissolved: 1899
- Ground: Beechgrove Park
- Match Secretary: Hughie Clifford, Philip M'Mahon
Home colours

Carfin Rovers F.C. was an association football club from Carfin in Lanarkshire, active in the late 19th century.

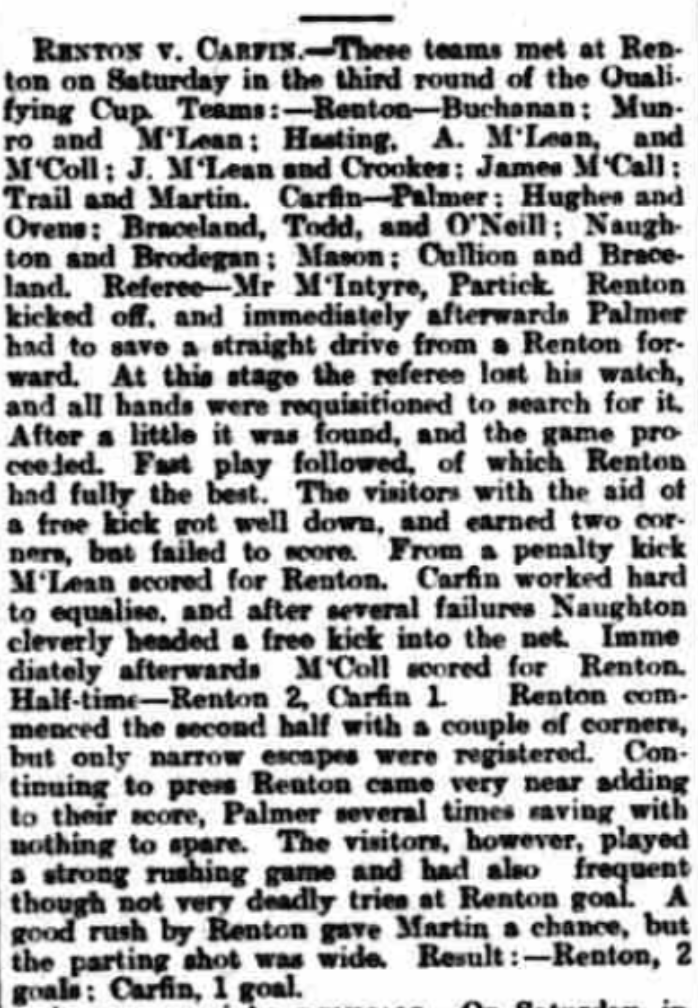
1898–99 Scottish Qualifying Cup 3rd round, Renton 2–1 Carfin Rovers, Hamilton Herald, 14 October 1898

== History ==
The club was formed in 1897, "from the ashes" of the Carfin Shamrock club. The media often referred to the club more simply as Carfin.

Rovers joined the Scottish Football Association that August, Its side for its first Scottish Qualifying Cup tie in 1897–98, at home to Albion Rovers, contained Hughie Clifford and William Mason, both of whom had been players at Shamrock, plus Thomas and Galloway, formerly of Motherwell. A good-tempered match ended 1–0 to the visitors.

Rovers bounced back from the defeat with its biggest competitive win - 13–0 in the Lanarkshire Cup, against Airdriehill - which put the club into the semi-final, against Motherwell, but the Steelmen had an easy time of it, winning 6–1.

Rovers only had one more season in senior football, and beat Uddingston in the second round in the Qualifying Cup (after walking over a "non est" Blantyre), but lost at Renton in the third, when a win would have put the club into the Scottish Cup proper; Carfin was reckoned without a chance before the game, but nearly caused a great shock, the balance of play favouring a draw. However Carfin lost to East Lanarkshire in its first round Lanarkshire Cup tie, the blame in part being put on a decision to go to Harthill by brake in windy conditions, which left the team not only unfit, but at a disadvantage in gauging the effect of the wind on an exposed and unfamiliar ground. The E.L. repeated the result when the clubs met in the Consolation Cup.

The club was also one of the five which formed part of the Lanarkshire Football Second League, scheduled for the latter half of the 1898–99 season, but which does not seem to have completed.

The club died as the result of a breakaway; perhaps notably, the club had changed secretary the previous season amid some rancour. The new club, Carfin Emmet, claimed it had the right to use Beechgrove Park. Rovers' last action was scratching to Albion Rovers in the first round of the 1899–1900 Qualifying Cup, by which time the club existed "in name only"; the club secretary tried to claim that Emmet had inherited Rovers' debts, but after the Scottish FA investigated the matter and ruled the clubs were separate entities, the Carfin secretary's letter was "relegated to the waste paper basket without being read".

== Colours ==
The club wore white jerseys and blue knickers in its first season, and black afterwards.

== Ground ==
The club played at Beechgrove Park, which was "not by any means an ideal one", with a small and narrow playing area.

== Nickname ==
The club's nickname of the Dandy Dandy came from the Dandy Rows, streets of miners' cottages in the village. The club was also known as the Double Back Row for the same reason.

== Notable players ==
- Hughie Clifford, later of Stoke
- William "Cosh" Mason, who had played for Nottingham Forest after leaving Shamrock
