= Scottish Football Combination =

The Scottish Football Combination was a football league football structure set up in Scotland for clubs outside the Scottish Football League and the reserves (or A sides) of some of the League members.

== History ==
=== 1896–1911 ===
The competition was formed on 7 July 1896, by sides from various other competitions, including the Scottish Football Alliance and the Midland League. A handful of reserve clubs also expressed a wish to join, and these were accepted; indeed, the competition was over-subscribed, Hamilton Academical being accepted as members over Albion Rovers by 9 votes to 7, and Third Lanark's A side being preferred to that of Clyde. Nutt of Wishaw Thistle was the inaugural president, with Willie Maley of Celtic as vice-president.

Reserve sides won the first four titles; the prestige of the competition was such that on six occasions before 1906 member clubs were elected to the Scottish League. In 1906, another competition, the Scottish Football Union, was formed, and six clubs left the Combination for the Union. Although new clubs were recruited, the status of the Combination took a blow, and the competition petered out during the 1910–11 season.

=== 1935–37 ===
A second Football Combination was formed with a similar mix of A teams and first XIs in 1935; the A teams were those ineligible to join the regular reserve league as their parent clubs were not in the Scottish First Division. The first President of the revived league was A. A. Jackson of Ayr United and the competition was initially made up of seven clubs, although one of them (Rosyth Dockyard) withdrew before the season started. Clubs agreed to pay 15 third-class railway fares to visiting clubs, and admission was capped at 6d.

This only lasted one full season; the second season saw two clubs stop playing partway through and the Combination disbanded before the 1937–38 season.

== Membership ==
- 5th K.O.S.B.: 1908–10
- Albion Rovers: 1897–1903
- Alloa Athletic: 1903–06
- Annbank: 1909–10
- Arthurlie: 1897–1901
- Ayr Parkhouse: 1904–06
- Ayr United A: 1935–37
- Bathgate: 1905–06
- Beith: 1903–09
- Bo'ness: 1935–37
- Broxburn Athletic: 1906–08
- Camelon: 1903–05
- Celtic A: 1896–97
- Cowdenbeath A: 1906–07
- Dalbeattie Star: 1935–37
- Dumbarton: 1905–06
- Dumfries: 1906–11
- Dykehead: 1905–09
- East Stirlingshire: 1896–97
- Edinburgh City A: 1935–37
- Falkirk: 1896–97
- Galston: 1904–09
- Girvan Athletic: 1908–11, 1935–37
- Hamilton Academical: 1896–98
- Heart of Midlothian A: 1896–97, 1898–99
- Hurlford: 1898–1905, 1806–08
- Johnstone: 1898–1905, 1906–08
- Kilbarchan: 1899–1904
- Lanemark: 1907–11
- Lanark: 1902–03
- Maxwelltown Volunteers: 1907–08
- Maybole: 1906–11
- Morton A: 1903–05
- Nithsdale Wanderers: 1909–11, 1935–37
- Queen's Park Strollers/Victoria XI: 1892–1902, 1903–11, 1935–37
- Rangers A: 1896–1899
- Renton: 1902–06
- Royal Albert: 1896–1906
- St Mirren A: 1899–1904
- Stenhousemuir: 1896–97, 1905–06
- Stranraer: 1935–37
- Third Lanark A: 1897–1903, 1935–36
- Thornliebank: 1897–1901, 1902–06
- Vale OCOBA: 1935–37
- Vale of Leven: 1902–05
- Wishaw Thistle: 1896–1900
- Wishaw United: 1900–03

== Champions ==
Team	Titles	Seasons
Albion Rovers	2	1901–02, 1902–03
Arthurlie	1	1900–01
Ayr United A	1	1936–37
Beith	1	1904–05
Dalbeattie Star	1	1935–66
Dumbarton	1	1905–06
Galston	3	1906–07 (shared), 1907–08, 1908–09
Girvan Athletic	1	1910–11 (shared)
Heart of Midlothian A	1	1896–97
Johnstone	1	1906–07 (shared)
Nithsdale Wanderers	1	1909–10
Queen's Park Strollers	1	1899–1900
Rangers A	2	1897–98, 1898–99
Royal Albert	1	1903–04

== See also ==
- Defunct leagues in Scottish football
