= East Kilbride F.C. (1877) =

East Kilbride
- Full name: East Kilbride Football Club
- Founded: 1877
- Dissolved: 1882
- Ground: Kirktonholm
- President: Thomas Rae
- Secretary: Robert Crombie
Home colours

East Kilbride Football Club was a 19th-century football club based in East Kilbride, Lanarkshire, Scotland.

== History ==
The club was formed in 1877, its first recorded match being in September that year, a 2–1 defeat to Blantyre. An earlier club of the same name, formed in 1871, does not seem to be related.

The club entered the Scottish Cup twice, losing in the first round both times. In 1878–79 it lost 4–0 at Stonelaw, without the Stonelaw goalkeeper having to make a save. In 1879–80 it lost 1–0 at Airdrie.

East Kilbride then stepped back from the national competition, entering the Lanarkshire Cup instead for the first time in 1881–82. The season started promisingly, with a 3–3 draw against Hamilton in a friendly, but in the county cup, the club lost 5–1 at Airdrieonians in the first round. There is no further record of the club afterwards.

== Colours ==
The club wore navy blue and gold hoops.

== Grounds ==
The club originally played at Shaw Park, 5 minutes' walk from East Kilbride railway station. In 1879 it moved to Kirktonholm, three minutes closer to the station.
