= Wishaw F.C. =

Association football club in Scotland

Wishaw
- Full name: Wishaw Football Club
- Nickname: Wishae or Wishy
- Founded: 1903
- Ground: The Beltane, Wishaw
- Capacity: 1,000
- Chairman: Wilson Paterson
- Manager: Johnny Fallon
- League: West of Scotland League Fourth Division
- 2025–26: West of Scotland League Fourth Division, 13th of 16
- Website: http://www.wishaw-juniors.co.uk/
Home colours	Away colours

Wishaw Football Club (previously known as Wishaw Juniors) is a Scottish football club based in the town of Wishaw, North Lanarkshire. The club currently competes in the West of Scotland League Fourth Division.

== History ==
The club was founded in 1903 as Wishaw Amateurs, itself formed after the collapse of Wishaw United F.C., a club made from the remnants of the town's senior clubs Wishaw Thistle F.C. and Wishaw F.C., both of which were wound up in 1900.

The club originally played in the Midland League and changed its name to Wishaw Thistle in 1906. The club replaced Stenhousemuir F.C. in the Scottish Football Union in 1907, and entered the Scottish Cup on a number of occasions, but never made the tournament proper. The club however won the Scottish Consolation Cup (for clubs eliminated from the qualifying rounds) in 1909.

The First World War had a dramatic effect on football but the club managed to continue to operate for a time, sometimes fielding 'guest players', i.e. service personnel who had been players with top English sides such as Tottenham Hotspur and Manchester City, but were stationed locally. Wishaw Thistle's Club Captain, William Angus of Carluke who had also turned out for Glasgow Celtic, was to see action in France very early on in the war and was awarded the Victoria Cross for what was described as the most heroic deed ever by a British soldier in rescuing his officer, Lt William Martin (also from Carluke) on 12 June 1915 at Givenchy-lès-la-Bassée. William Angus was badly injured in the course of the rescue and although retaining a keen interest in football throughout his life – later being president of Carluke Rovers – he was unable to resume playing. After being presented with his medal by King George V, the injured Angus returned to Scotland a National Hero and was presented to packed attendances at Parkhead (Glasgow Celtic) and Ibrox Park (Glasgow Rangers) receiving standing ovations at each stadium.

When football re-commenced at the end of World War I Wishaw Thistle attempted unsuccessfully to restart as a senior club then appears to have re-invented itself as a Junior club in the form of Wishaw YMCA Juniors bringing to an end over 30 years of Senior football in the town.

During its Senior years, Wishaw Thistle won a number of trophies and played host to visiting English Clubs Liverpool, Everton, Stoke, Sunderland and Notts County in friendly matches. It also took part in the Invitation Football Tournament at the 'International Exhibition' held by Edinburgh City Council to commemorate the opening of the world-famous Forth Railway Bridge and also played against many of today's current senior Scottish clubs in the S.F.A. Scottish Cup including, on one occasion hosting Glasgow Celtic in Wishaw. A number of the club's players went on to play for more illustrious clubs. One player, David Calderhead, was later to become manager of Chelsea F C, a position he held for about 25 years; he is credited with turning the London side from being a relatively small club into a major force in the English game.

Wishaw Thistle was a well-supported club in an era when football was growing rapidly as a spectator pastime and high four- and even five- figure crowds were not uncommon for major matches.

=== Wishaw Juniors ===
Wishaw's football club started its second 'incarnation' as a 'Junior' Club under the name of Wishaw YMCA Juniors in 1919–20 as members of the Scottish Junior League, enjoying early success in winning the Scottish Junior League Victory Cup and also the Hozier Cup (named after Lady Hozier, wife of Sir Winston Churchill). A second Hozier Cup was added the following season. The name was then shortened to Wishaw Juniors in 1924 and the club switched to the Lanarkshire Junior Football League.

The club were then one of a large number of rebel clubs which broke away from the Scottish Junior FA in the bitter player contract based 'Intermediate dispute' in the late 1920s – playing for several seasons in the East Division of the Western Intermediate League before returning to the Junior fold once again after the dispute was resolved in 1930–31 as members of the Lanarkshire Junior League where the club remained until World War II.

The war had a major impact on football across the country with many clubs and Leagues closing down – many never to return However, Wishaw managed to continue in operation, competing in the short-lived Lanark and Lothians League which lasted during the War years with a number of Lanarkshire teams joining with their counterparts in West Lothian. During this period Wishaw reached the final of the East of Scotland Cup and have the unusual claim to be the only team to have played in the Scottish, West and East Cup finals. The club also won the St Michael's Cup one of the most prestigious trophies played for by East Junior Clubs. After the end of the War, Wishaw returned to the Lanarkshire Junior League when it reformed.

Re-organisation of Scottish Junior football in 1968 saw the end of the Lanarkshire Junior League which had been losing clubs as junior football declined with the remaining Lanarkshire clubs joining with those from the greater Glasgow area to form the Central Junior Football League. Although Wishaw did start out in the top 'A' Division of the new Central Junior League, being one of the stronger Lanarkshire sides – for various reasons the club was unable to sustain its position and dropped to the bottom 'C' division where it remained for a number of years.

Further re-organisation of Junior football saw the Central League amalgamate with the Ayrshire Junior Football League to form the SJFA West Region in 2002. The club once again found itself stranded in the bottom tier of an expanded 'Regional' structure playing in the Central District Division 2. After struggling for most of the next dozen seasons, Wishaw finally achieved promotion out of the bottom Division in 2013/14 under then manager John McKeown. McKeown was to leave shortly thereafter to take over as manager of top Ayrshire side Cumnock Juniors.

It has been many years since Wishaw tasted success but despite the club's current lower league status it has nevertheless managed to reach the Sectional League Cup Semi-finals in each of seasons 2014–15, 2015–16 and 2016–17 and the Semi-final of the prestigious West of Scotland Junior Cup in 2015–16. In season 2017–18 Wishaw belied their third tier status by reaching the semi-final of the Scottish Junior Cup losing by a single goal in a two-leg tie against Ayrshire side Hurlford United.

=== Recent history ===
Beginning in the late 1960s, Wishaw suffered a prolonged period in the junior football 'wilderness' during which the club not only lost its home ground and most of its support base but also came close to folding completely on several occasions. The club's home town suffered significantly from the 1970s onwards with very high rates of unemployment following the demise of traditional industries locally particularly that of steel making and heavy engineering. Eventually a small group of enthusiastic volunteers took over the running of the club in the early part of the current century and despite very restricted budgets, slow but steady progress was made in rebuilding the club on and off the pitch.

After relocating to The Beltane in Wishaw, the club secured promotion from the bottom tier of the Scottish Junior Football Association (SJFA) West Region during the 2013–14 season under manager John McKeown. Following the season, McKeown left to become manager of Cumnock Juniors. In October 2014, former Dunfermline Athletic midfielder Chris McGroarty was appointed as his successor.

Despite the departure of several key players, McGroarty guided the club to safety in the First Division during his first season. In the 2015–16 season, Wishaw narrowly missed promotion, finishing one point short of the promotion places. During the 2016–17 season, the club recorded a 2–0 victory over Premier League side Cumnock Juniors in the first round of the Scottish Junior Cup. However, Wishaw again failed to secure promotion at the end of the season.

In August 2017 Chris McGroarty and his assistant Glen Weir and coach Mark Daly left the club to join Kilsyth Rangers. Wishaw again moved quickly to appoint former professional footballer John Brogan as their new manager. Brogan played for Scottish senior clubs St Johnstone (where he was that club's record goal scorer), Hibernian and Hamilton Academicals and also had extensive appropriate managerial experience having managed several other Junior Football clubs. Brogan resigned in February 2018 and was replaced by former Hearts striker, Derek Holmes. Wishaw were then managed by Kieran McGuinness, assisted by Barry Fraser and Paul Finnigan until resigning in Dec 2019 citing other commitments. The club then moved quickly bringing back the former McGroarty, Daly, & Weir management team with Mark Daly taking the manager role.

== Stadia ==
Wishaw has had a number of home grounds down the years and has played at Stewarton Street, at the Old Public Park (off Main Street) and at the original Belhaven Park (better known as the site of the former Wishaw Dog Track and originally the home of the Town's long defunct cycling club) but for most of its existence the club was based at Recreation Park at Kirk Road, Wishaw. The ground, which had banked terracing, a grandstand and a covered spectator area and Social Club was lost to the club in the early 1990s and thereafter Wishaw became homeless sharing with Coltness United at Victoria Park, Newmains for a number of years until 1999 when they secured tenancy at Wishaw Sports Centre. This agreement did not work out though and they returned to sharing with Coltness. Wishaw then secured a second deal to play at the Sports Centre, before moving into the nearby Beltane Park for the beginning of the 2011–12 season.[2]

=== Beltane Park ===
Beltane Park
- The Beltane
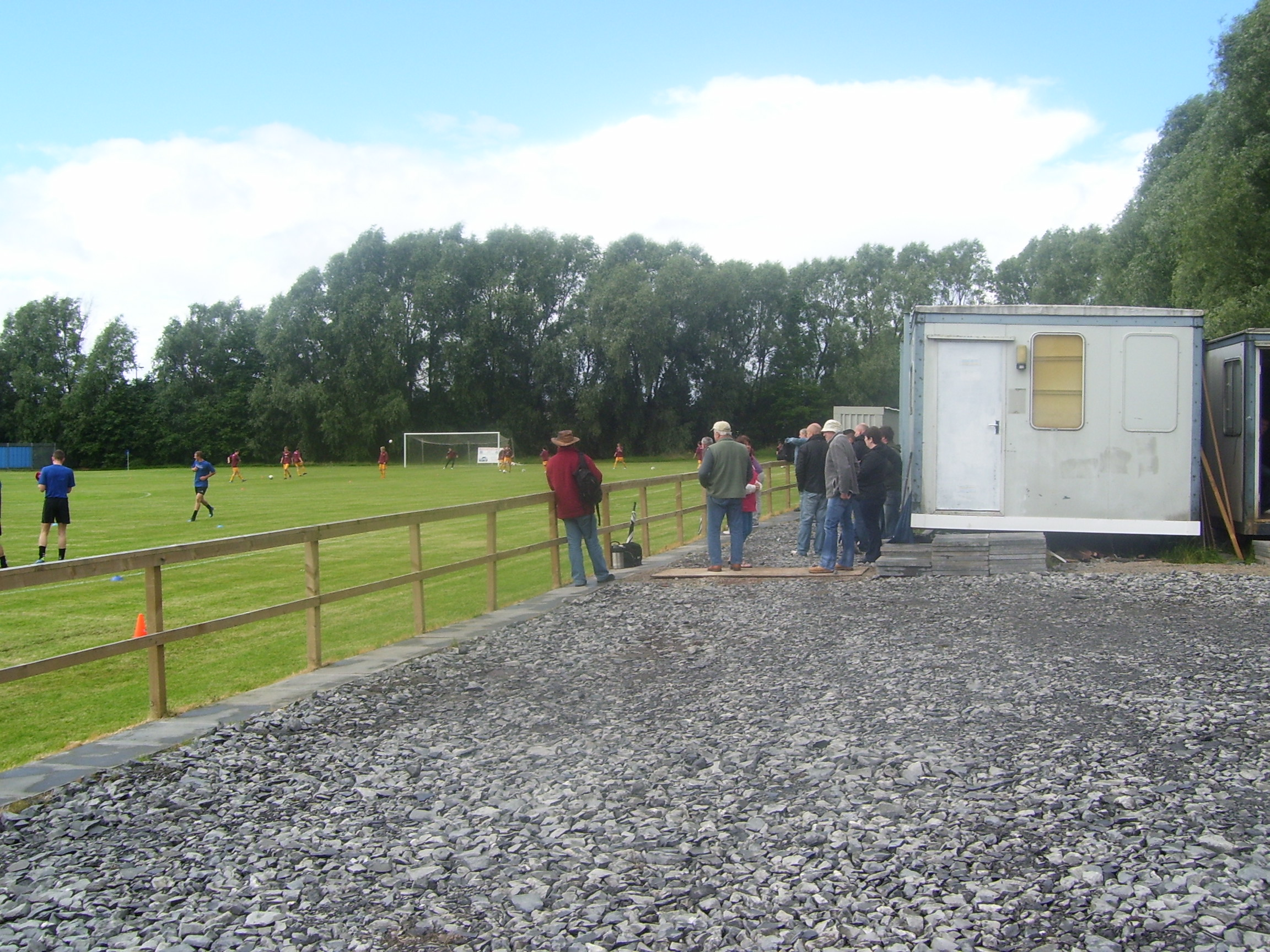

- Location within North Lanarkshire
- Location: Wishaw, North Lanarkshire, Scotland
- Coordinates: 55°46′24.1″N 3°56′4.55″W
- Owner: Wishaw FC
- Capacity: 500
- Surface: Grass

Construction
- Groundbreaking: 2010
- Opened: 2010

Tenant
- Wishaw Juniors

The Beltane, as it is known locally, is likely to be the team's home for the foreseeable future. Originally just an open public pitch, the club's enthusiastic small committee has managed to develop The Beltane into a mini stadium despite only having a very modest budget. The ground is fully fenced off and offers a mixture of hard and grassed standing accommodation for c1,000 persons with Ladies and Gents toilets, Snack Bar, Hospitality Facility, a covered wheelchair viewing platform and a small covered enclosure for 50/60 persons. The Beltane was opened on 28 July 2012 with a match against a Motherwell F.C XI. For a number of years the record attendance was 300 set in a West of Scotland Cup tie against Ayrshire junior giants Auchinleck Talbot which was won 3–2 by the home team despite a three-division gap between the two clubs. However, this was surpassed by an attendance of c650 persons who attended a first leg semi-final of the Scottish Junior Cup on Saturday 14 April 2018.

In 2010, Wishaw Juniors secured a 10-year lease to use Beltane Park as the home ground. Since then, the once open-grassed area has been transformed into a football ground, with terracing along the east side of the ground, and fencing around the whole pitch. Also recently installed at the venue are toilets, a snack bar, a players lounge and dressing rooms, with each of them based in portacabins.

The ground had a capacity of around 500 spectators when officially opened on 28 July 2012, when Wishaw played the under-17's of the local senior side Motherwell.

== Associated teams ==
The club had an under-19 side (now disbanded) and a women's team, which was originally formed in 1995 and has had its name changed several times. It was originally Wishaw Ladies then Lanarkshire Ladies and then Motherwell Ladies Football Club until it was changed to, Wishaw Juniors Ladies. The ladies team folded midway through 2011.

== Honours ==
Scottish Consolation Cup

- 1908–09

Lanarkshire Cup

- 1915–16, 1916–17

Lanarkshire Express Cup

- 1915–16

Lanarkshire Consolation Cup

- 1898–99

Near Misses

- Lanarkshire Junior Challenge Cup: 1890–91
- Lanarkshire Alliance League Runner-up: 1896–97

=== Wishaw Juniors ===
- West of Scotland Cup: 1933–34
- West of Scotland Consolation Cup: 1931–32, 1936–37
- Lanarkshire League: 1925–26, 1934–35, 1937–38, 1940-41 1945–46
- Lanarkshire Junior Challenge Cup: 1925–26, 1933–34, 1937–38, 1941–42, 1965–66
- Lanarkshire Junior Consolation Cup 1919–20
- Lanarkshire Hozier Cup: 1919–20, 1920/21, 1936–37, 1946–47, 1950–51, 1960–61, 1962–63, 1966–67
- Lanarkshire Central Cup:1926–27, 1932–33, 1938–39, 1964–65
- Lanarkshire League Cup: 1925–26,1950–51, 1960–61
- Lanarkshire Intermediate Cup: 1928–29
- St Michael's Cup: 1944–45
- Scottish Junior League Victory Cup: 1919–20

Near misses

- Scottish Junior Cup Semi-Finalists: 1934–35, 2017–18
- Scottish Intermediate Cup Finalists: 1928–29
- West of Scotland Cup Finalists: 1950–51
- East of Scotland Cup Finalists: 1942–43
- St Michael's Cup Finalists: 1941–42
- McIver Cup Finalists 1942–43
- Scottish Junior League Runner-up:1919–20
- Evening Citizen Cup Finalists: 1949–50
- Lanarkshire Junior Challenge Cup Finalists: 1920–21, 1934–35,1945–46
- Lanarkshire Junior League Runner-up: 1933–34, 1936–37, 1962–63
- Lanarkshire League Cup Finalists: 1926–27, 1937–38, 1938–39, 1954–55
- Lanarkshire Central Cup Finalists: 1938–39, 1964–65
- Lanarkshire Consolation Cup Finalists: 1931–32
- Hozier Cup Finalists: 1921–22, 1932–33, 1933–34, 1935–36, 1945–46, 1955–56, 1961–62, 1964–65

== Former players ==
Down the years approximately 150 Wishaw players have moved on to senior professional football clubs in Scotland, England and further afield. Several of these were involved in major trophy success as players, management and backroom staff. Two former players Bobby Moncur (Newcastle United captain) and Jimmy Gordon (as Part of Brian Clough's management team which won the European Cup twice With Nottingham Forest) enjoyed successes in the major European football club competitions. Others continued to play their football at Junior level and enjoyed success with Wishaw being capped also for the Scottish Junior FA International team.

1. FORMER PLAYERS AWARDED JUNIOR INTERNATIONAL CAPS

- 1920 McNab – member of touring party which played 6 matches in Norway with 3 matches against Stavanger (in Stavanger) and 3 matches against Brann (in Bergen) – the first ever tour abroad by a Scottish 'representative' side at any level.
- 1924 Mackay v Ireland
- 1924 Kerr v England
- 1926 Lynas v Ireland
- 1926 Baillie v Wales
- 1926 Lynas v Wales
- 1937 Whiteford V England
- 1938 Watt (capt) v Wales
- 1939 Thomson v England
- 1948 Hunter v Wales

2. FORMER PLAYERS AWARDED FULL SENIOR INTERNATIONAL CAPS

- Bobby Moncur (16)
- Alex Wilson (Arsenal) Also won FA Cup.
- John May (Rangers) (5)
- Bob Telfer (Australia)
- Peter Buchanan(Chelsea) v Wales 1935

3. FORMER PLAYERS WITH OTHER INVOLVEMENT IN INTERNATIONAL FOOTBALL

- Peter Houston (Assistant Scotland Manager).
- Bob Telfer Player, Coach, Referee, Selector and Administrator of football in Australia – Member of Australian Football Hall Of Fame

4. FORMER PLAYERS WITH INVOLVEMENT IN EUROPEAN CLUB COMPETITIONS

- Bobby Moncur – Captain of Newcastle United 1969 Inter City Fairs Cup winning team.
- Jimmy Gordon – Coach for Brian Clough's Nottingham Forest twice European Cup winning side. Assistant manager of Clough's Leeds United. Played for Newcastle and Middlesbrough. See book/film The Dammed United.
- Jackie Hutton – Manager of Cliftonville, took club into Cup Winners Cup against FC Nantes after winning Irish Cup in 1979.

5. PLAYERS WHO HAVE PLAYED AND/OR MANAGED IN SENIOR FOOTBALL

- Peter Buchanan – Chelsea
- Jimmy Gordon – Newcastle, Middlesbrough
- Peter Houston – Falkirk, Dundee United
- Jackie Hutton – Cliftonville, Crusaders & Portadown.
- George McGowan – Motherwell, Preston, Chester and Stockport County. Youth Coach at Wrexham
- Matthew McVittie – Celtic
- Bobby Moncur – Newcastle, Sunderland, Carlisle. Managed Carlisle United, Heart of Midlothian, Plymouth Argyle, Hartlepool.
- Jimmy Moran – Leicester City, Norwich City, Northampton Town, Darlington and Workington
- John May – Rangers
- Jimmy Porter – Accrington Stanley, also was temporarily in charge of Manchester United.
- Clatworthy 'Charlie' Rennox – Manchester United, Clapton Orient, Grimsby Town.
- Alex Wilson – Arsenal (FA Cup winner)

6 PLAYERS TRANSFERRED / ETC to Senior Clubs before WWII INCOMPLETE LIST

- Bill Michael 1898 Heart of Midlothian, Liverpool, Bristol City, Falkirk, Motherwell. One Scottish League Cap.
- John May ?1904 Rangers 178 appearance 18 goals 5 international appearances v Wales and Ireland 3 league appearances
- David Calderhead ?
- John Boylen 1921 Lincoln City (Wigan, Grimsby)
- William McFadyen 1921/22 Motherwell 1 International Cap 1 League Cap
- George Harper 1921/22 Sunderland (Manchester City, Chrystal Palace Luton Town, Weymouth)
- James W Porter 1921/22 Bury (Manchester City) (was City trainer in 1944, Managed Bury & Accrington Stanley).
- Thomas McKay 1924/25 St Mirren (Brighton)
- James Yardley 1924/25 Clapton Orient (Luton, Charlton, Millwall, Third Lanark, Ayr United, Morton).
- Alexander L McDougall 1925/26 Derby County (Wolverhampton Wanderers).
- Craig Arnott 1926/27 Motherwell (Swansea).
- Robert C Kerr 1927 Heart of Midlothian
- Philip R Watson 1927/28 Hamilton Academicals (Barnsley, Blackpool, Queen of the South).
- Robert Donnelly 1931/32 Partick Thistle (Manchester City, Morton). Won League Title With Manchester City.
- John Wood 1932/33 Clyde
- Tommy Egan 1933 Hibernian
- Robert Johnstone 1933/34 Partick Thistle (Motherwell, St Mirren, Albion Rovers).
- Bob Telfer ?
- John McInally 1934
- William Stoddart 1934 St Mirren
- William Black 1934 Hibernian (Watford, Dumfermline)
- Peter Buchanan 1935
- James McCombe 1934/35 Heart of Midlothian (Clyde, Kings Park, Clapham Orient).
- James 'Jimmy'Gordon 1934/35 Newcastle United ( Middlesbrough) Trainer for Brian Clough (see separate entry).
- William H Stoddart 1934/35 St Mirren
- Peter S Buchanan 1935 Chelsea (Fulham) Scottish Cap v Ireland 1937
- Thomas Brady 1935/36 Hibernian
- Frank Farrell 1935/36 Hibernian (Clapham Orient)
- George S Hull 1936 Sheffield United
- James M Lees 1937/38 Leith Athletic
- James Watt 1937/38 Motherwell (Blackpool) Scottish Cap v Australia 1933
- William Thornton 1937/38 Motherwell
- John Divers 1938/39 Airdrieonians (Dundee United)
- Alex Smith 1938/39 Motherwell (Clyde, East Fife)
- Hugh O'Neil 1938/39 Celtic
- William Hannah 1940/41 Partick Thistle (Albion Rovers)
- George Henderson 1940/41 Dumbarton
- DFG Hopkin 1940/41 Hamilton Academicals ( Previously with Wolverhampton Wanderers)
- George Jeffrey 1940/41 Dumbarton (Aberdeen, Hamilton Academicals)
- Andrew Jack ? Tranmere
- G Ross 1940/41 Albion Rovers
- James O'Neil 1940/41 Motherwell
- Richard Hamilton 1941/42 Airdrionians
- Richard Hamilton 1941/42 Morton
- John Hunter 1941/42 Albion Rovers
- Archibald Shaw 1941/42 Motherwell
- Robert Torrance 1942 Dumbarton
- John Craig 1942/43 Dumbarton (East Fife)
- Charles Higgins 1942/43 Morton (Kilmarnock)
- Reginald F Westbrook 1942/43 East Fife
- Francis Walsh 1943/44 Ardeer Rec (Kilmarnock)
- William Callan 1943/44 Kilmarnock
- ? Cunningham 1943/44 Falkirk
- Robert Taggart 1944 Motherwell
- John Collins 1944/45 Hibernian
- David Mathie 1944/45 Motherwell
- Alexander L Wemyss 1944/45
- Samuel C Campbell 1945/46 Partick Thistle
- Thomas McD McCabe 1945/46 Hibernian
- James Henderson (1) 1945/46 Raith Rovers
- James Henderson (2) 1945/46 Motherwell
- Alexander Jardine 1945/46 Dundee United
- James Kilgour 1945/46 Kilmarnock

Players who transferred to senior clubs after the Second World War (incomplete list)

- Archie Shaw FB 1946–58 Motherwell 2 Scottish League Caps
- Willie Thomson 1946–47 Falkirk
- John McFarlane 1946–47 Hamilton Accies
- Alec Jardine FB 1946–47 Dundee United, Millwall
- Sammy Campbell W 1946–47 Partick Thistle
- Willie McSeveney D 1946–48 Dunfermline then Motherwell (one of the Ancell Babes).
- Jim Barclay W 1947–49 Airdrie
- Phil Ward 1947 Hamilton
- Dick Hamilton GK 1949–52 Motherwell
- Guy Lennox CF 1951–53 Airdrie
- Jimmy Greenock WH 1951–59 Queen of the South, Falcons New Jersey
- Bob Park G 1951–52 Queen of the South, Hull City
- John Murray 1951–52 Airdrie
- Jack Henderson FB 1952–53 Clyde
- Dave Shaw CF 1954–56 Airdrie
- Harry Cross 1955–56 Hamilton Accies
- Jimmy McManus 1955–57 Airdrie
- James Moran IF 1956 Leicester City
- Jim Ewart IR 1958 30 Aug Airdrie
- Tommy Milligan LH 1958 30 Aug Airdrie
- Johnny McCulloch OR 1958 11 Oct Airdrie
- Jim MacDonald IF 1958 11 Oct Hibernian
- John Markie CH 1959 2 July Newcastle United
- Eddie King IF 1960 27 Aug Luton Town
- Eddie King IL 1960 17 Sept Hibernian
- Robert Plenderlieth CH 1960 20 Oct Hibernian
- John McVittie W 1961–63 Celtic
- Bobby Waugh OL 1961 25 Feb East Fife then Boca Juniors, Argentina
- John McCulloch CF 1961 28 Oct Berwick Rangers
- Eddie King IF 1961 4 Nov Berwick Rangers
- Bobby McSeveney FB 1961 16 Dec Hull City
- Bobby Moncur 1961 ? Newcastle United
- John (Jackie) Hutton IF 1962 3 Mar Hamilton Accies
- George McGowan OR 1962 11 Aug Preston North End
- George McGowan OR 1962 18 Aug Preston North End
- John Carson 1962–63 ? Hamilton Accies
- Willie Todd OR 1963 1 June Third Lanark
- John Gilmour IF 1964 29 Feb Hamilton Accies
- Peter Campbell OL 1965 Stirling Albion
- Enoch Gilchrist IF 1967 19 Aug Hamilton Accies
- Bobby Fulton LH 1970 12 Dec Airdrionians
- Jim McGuigan CF 1971 27/11 Kilmarnock
- Brian Lannon M !972-75 Ayr United
- Joe Cairney F 1975 13 Sep Airdrie, Brisbane City and Brisbane Lions (favourite trick was the 'Cairney shuffle').
- Douglas Watt FB 1975 27 Dec Airdrionians
- Andy Docherty FB 1976–79 Airdrie
- Peter Houston F 1977–78 Airdrie
- Martin McBride W 1985–90 Motherwell
- Kevin McKeown 1985 Motherwell
- Neil Candlish F 1986–88 Motherwell
- Mark Reilly M 1989–90 Motherwell
- Chris Newall D 2003 Arbroath
- Alan Creer GK 2005 Albion Rovers
- Daniel Kindlan F 2018 Queens Park
- Dean Kindlan M 2018 Queens Park
- Paul McGeough M 2018 Albion Rovers

8 BITS AND PIECES

- 1932/33 Wishaw v Royal Albert Scottish Junior Cup – 1-1, 1-1, 2-0 (Protest) 1-1, Wishaw 1- Royal Albert 0
- 1935/36 On Sat 2 April 1935 Wishaw lose 2–1 to Tranent in Round 7 of the Scottish Junior Cup in front of 16,513 at Tynecastle (Heart of Midlothian FC) ending a 33-game unbeaten run.

In the previous round it took four games to separate Wishaw and Shotts United with a total of 26,500 watching the matches the last being hosted at Fir Park (Motherwell FC).

- In 1935 Wishaw also played host to Edinburgh senior clubs Heart of Midlothian and Hibernian in testimonial matches for players Jimmy Sommerville and Archie Bryce respectively.
- 1979/80 Wishaw v Musselburgh Scottish Junior Cup - 0-0, 0-0, 3-3, 1-1, Musselburgh 0 Wishaw 2
- Local lad Jimmy Delaney played one trial for Wishaw before signing for Celtic and later moving to Manchester United.

9. In Progress

- (Scotland) Pat Holton
- (Scotland) Jim McCafferty
- (Scotland) Tally Sneddon
