= Airdriehill F.C. =

Airdriehill
- Full name: Airdriehill Football Club
- Founded: 1884
- Dissolved: 1899
- Ground: New Monkland
- Match Secretary: John Devlin, John M'Guigan
Home colours

Airdriehill Football Club was a Scottish association football club based in the town of Airdrie, Lanarkshire.

== History ==
The original Airdriehill club was struck from the Scottish Football Association membership roll in 1883, but in 1884 a new club started up with the same name; it appointed John Devlin, match secretary of the old club, to undertake the same role for the new.

The club had already missed the boat with regard to long-term success. It had 46 members on foundation, but Airdrieonians had already reached 100, and it would double its membership for 1885–86, while Airdriehill would be stuck on 40.

Airdriehill therefore struggled throughout its existence. In the Lanarkshire Cup, from 1884 to 1894, it won 3 ties. Its successes came in the Coatbridge Express Cup, which was a competition for clubs eliminated from the county cup before the final. It reached the Express Cup final in 1890–91 (after successfully protesting Wishaw Swifts' fielding of a Cup-tied player in the semi-final) and 1893–94, albeit suffering heavy defeats both times, 9–1 to Burnbank Swifts and 4–0 to Albion Rovers respectively.

The club had even less success in the Scottish Cup. Its first tie in its first entry, in 1884–85, ended in an 8–3 defeat to Wishaw Swifts. It did not enter again until 1886–87, losing 5–0 to Airdrieonians, and in 1887–88 lost 12–0 to Albion Rovers, which remains the Rovers' biggest Cup win.

It then took a year off from the competition again, returning in 1889–90 with a narrow and remarkable 6–5 defeat to Motherwell, Airdriehill's dispute regarding two of the goals being ignored The Scottish Football Association introduced preliminary rounds from 1891 and the Scottish Qualifying Cup from 1895; Airdriehill only won two ties in either competition the 1890s - in the first preliminary round of 1892–93, 5–0 against Burnbank Swifts (James Rice scoring a first-half hat-trick), and in the first preliminary round of 1894–95, 3–2 against new club Gaelic of Coatbridge.

=== 1895–96: dispute with Airdrieonians and the Lanarkshire FA ===
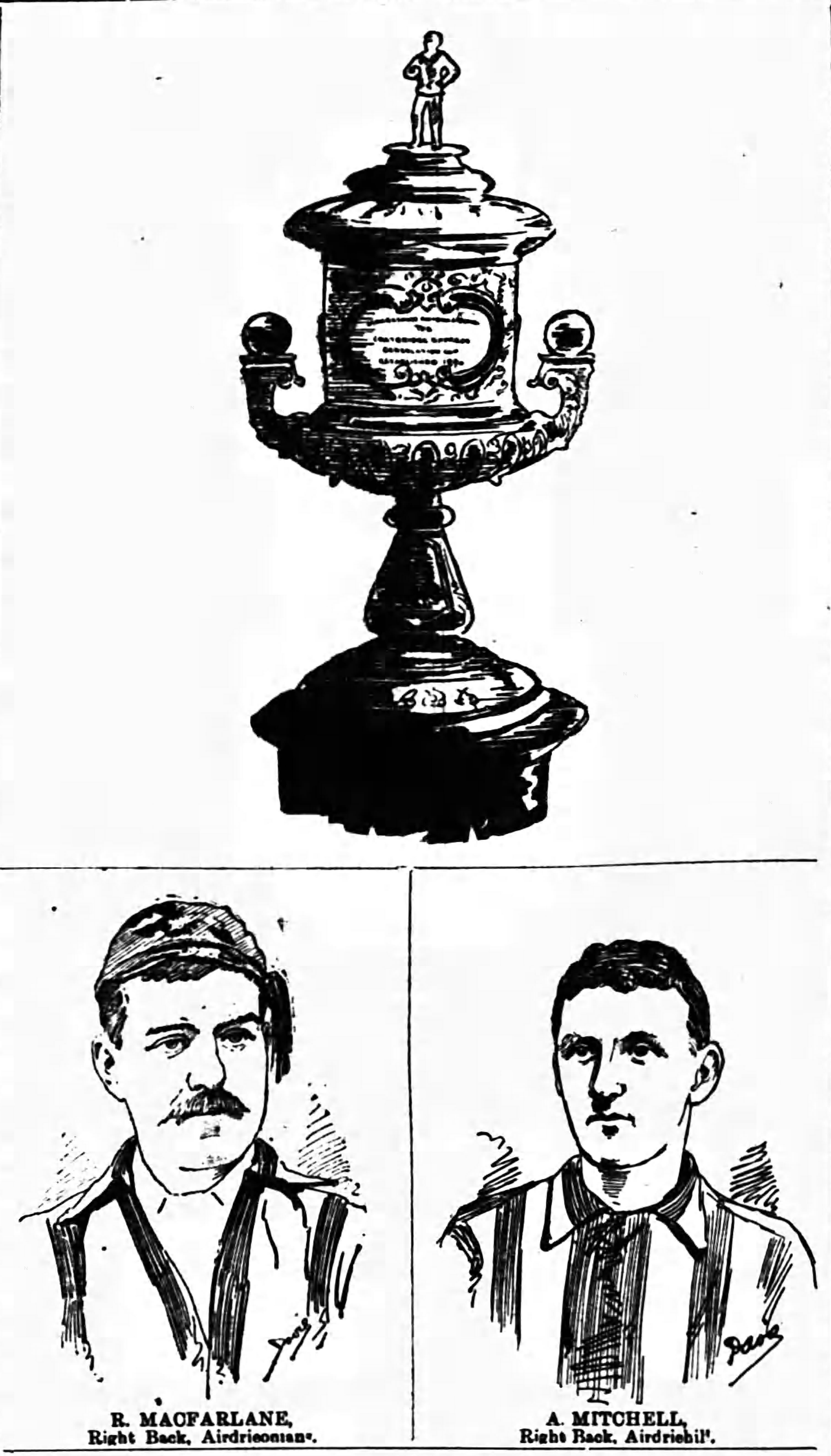
Coatbridge Express Cup, Macfarlane (Airdrieonians), and Mitchell (Airdriehill), Airdrie Advertiser, 30 May 1896

A key factor in the ultimate demise with the club arose from the 1895–96 Lanarkshire Cup. Airdriehill unexpectedly won its first round tie against Airdrieonians (by now in the Scottish League) 4–1, a result described as a "great surprise" and "the sensation of the season". The Onians protested on several grounds, and Airdriehill admitted that the goals were the wrong size (albeit too big, by up to 4 inches), and the pitch markings were not to standard (cut into the ground rather than being chalked, although Airdriehill had filled the cuttings with ash). However the Lanarkshire FA dismissed the protest by 5 votes to 4. Airdrieonians threatened to issue legal proceedings, and on 27 November the LFA called a special meeting, at which the decision was reversed, and Airdrieonians awarded the tie.

Incensed at this, Airdriehill issued legal action, on the basis that the LFA had no grounds on which to re-consider the matter, and, on 13 December 1895, the day before Airdrieonians was due to meet Hamilton Academical in the second round, an injunction was issued, stopping the tie from taking place.

As the legal action dragged into 1896, the Lanarkshire FA, rather than holding up the competition or leaving ties to be unplayed, simply awarded the second round tie to the Academical, leaving Airdriehill and Airdrieonians to play in the Coatbridge Express Cup. Ironically both clubs made it to the final, played on 23 May 1896, before the final verdict in the case. Airdriehill took the lead in the second half, but Airdrieonians soon equalized, and scored twice more in the final ten minutes to take the cup.

Airdriehill had some consolation from the result of the legal case, Sheriff Mair deciding that the LFA had had no power to re-consider the dismissal of Airdrieonians' appeal, and therefore order the LFA to pay damages to Airdriehill.

=== End of the club ===
Despite the legal success, the victory was Pyrrhic. The rise of the Scottish League meant that clubs in Airdriehill's position - with League members close by - was unsustainable.

The club's final years were spent in ignominy; in the first round of the 1896–97 Qualifying Cup, Airdriehill lost 14–0 at Linthouse, and withdrew from the Qualifying Cup without explanation in 1897–98. In the Lanarkshire Cup the same season the club was dismantled 13–0 at the new club Carfin Rovers. Airdriehill scratched again from the Qualifying Cup in 1898–99 and, for withdrawing from the national competition twice in a row, the Scottish FA struck the club from the roll before the season's end.

== Colours ==
The club originally wore scarlet jerseys (described as Garibaldi red) and white knickers. In 1892 the club changed to red shirts and black knickers.

== Grounds ==
The club played at New Monkland, 40 yards from Whiterigg station.
