= Wishaw F.C. (1899) =

Former association football club in Scotland

Wishaw
- Full name: Wishaw Football Club
- Nickname(s): the Vics, the Strikers
- Founded: 1899
- Dissolved: 1900
- Ground: Belhaven Park
- President: Archibald Munro
Home colours

Wishaw F.C. was a Scottish football team, from the town of Wishaw in Lanarkshire, which lasted for one season, but reached the major rounds of the Scottish Cup.

== History ==
The club was founded in June 1899, its foundation being the result of the Junior side Wishaw Victoria deciding to turn Senior and "fully professional"; the club applied to join the Scottish Football Association, the Lanarkshire FA, and the Scottish Football Combination. The club agreed a deal to use the Wishaw Cycling Club's ground at Belhaven Park.

The town of Wishaw already had a Senior club, Wishaw Thistle F.C., which had had some success, and was already a member of the Combination, but was now struggling financially, so the formation of Wishaw was a curious step. It may have been motivated by a disagreement with Thistle and the cycling club over the use of Belhaven Park after Thistle were faced with not being able to use the Old Public Park, but, perhaps significantly, many of the club's new players had taken part in strike action at Wishaw Colliery over the previous year.

The new club suffered a blow when the Combination turned down the club's application to join, and, after applications were re-opened, turned the club down a second time, on the basis that the club had "failed to show any more clearly that two clubs in Wishaw would be a paying concern".

By the time the season started, the club had settled on the name of Wishaw Football Club, amid media concerns that Wishaw could barely support one club. On being admitted to the Scottish FA, the new club signed a number of players, including goalkeeper Joseph Donaldson from Notts County, Goldie from Airdrieonians, and Ross and Wilson from Motherwell, plus Andrew Foyer from Thistle. The club's attempt to poach goalkeeper Broadley from Thistle was unsuccessful. However, the club's first game of the season was in opposition to a Thistle home Combination game at the same time, and the Wishaw public greatly favoured the older club.

=== Competitive football ===
The new club promptly entered the Scottish Cup, and was drawn to play the town rivals away in the first round of the Qualifying Cup, which made the tie "the tit-bit of the whole round". Before 2,000 spectators, the new club won 1–0; Thistle lost regular player Nelson on the eve of the match as he had signed for Reading. Thistle protested on the basis that Donaldson had played for Stevenston Thistle F.C. in the close season, so was not eligible for Wishaw, but the protest was dismissed, witnesses not coming up to proof and the chairman saying "a worse protest had never come before the Association".

Wishaw beat Uddingston 3–1 in the second round of the Qualifying Cup, in a "quiet, uninteresting game", and beat the same club in the first round of the Lanarkshire Cup shortly afterwards, this time by the more comfortable margin of 7–1. In the third round of the Qualifying Cup, Wishaw beat Longriggend 1–0. The win made Wishaw one of the final 16 clubs in the Qualifying Cup, and by doing so the club qualified for the Scottish Cup itself. Longriggend also protested against Donaldson's eligibility, but, without supporting evidence, the protest was dismissed.

In the fourth round of the Qualifying Cup, Wishaw was well beaten by Abercorn, who had adopted a "banging, forceful" style,

Before the first round proper, the club drew with Royal Albert in the Lanarkshire Cup semi-final, and the club duly went to Raploch Park for the replay, but alleged it was told that the match was due to be a friendly rather than the semi-final; the Royalists won 2–1, and were awarded the place in the final, with Wishaw's protest dismissed. Wishaw instructed solicitors to interdict the final, but, after the Lanarkshire FA dismissed a further appeal, decided to drop the action.

With only friendly matches to play between the Cup matches, crowds suffered; the visit of the Hearts "A" team attracted "scarcely a gross" of spectators. The Lanarkshire Football League was re-started up mid-season, but, with only 5 clubs, three of whom were members of other leagues, the fixtures were mostly scheduled for the end of the season.

The club was therefore unlucky to be drawn away to Maybole, a comparatively small club, in the first round proper, as the share of the gate money - in common with all of the ties other than the Thistle derby - did not cover the club's expenses. Although the Vics took the lead, Maybole equalized with a goal that was "glaringly offside", and the game ended 4–2 to the home side, the final goal also being dubious. Two weeks later the club played its first match in the Lanarkshire League, at home to their cross-town rivals, and Thistle gained ample revenge for the Cup exit with a 5–1 win.

=== Merger with Thistle ===
With crowds remaining small, it was obvious that two town clubs could not continue. Meetings took place in April 1900 with a view to merging the two sides, and on the 30th the members resolved to form a new club, Wishaw United F.C., adopting the Queen's Park colours of black and white hoops, but with both clubs finishing their respective seasons and clearing their debts to avoid any liabilities transferring over.

Wishaw nearly finished its existence on a high, being runners-up in the Coatbridge Express Trophy, a consolation cup for those knocked out of the Lanarkshire Cup before the final; the club's final match was a defeat to Dykehead.

== Colours ==
The club played in chocolate and white, probably in halves as that was the most popular pattern for chocolate or brown shirts at the time.

== Grounds ==
The club played at the Belhaven Park cycling track.

== Nickname ==
The media briefly referred to the club as the Strikers, referring to miners rather than footballers, but soon ceased after complaints from the club.
