= Longriggend F.C. =

Former association football club in Scotland

Longriggend
- Full name: Longriggend F.C.
- Nickname(s): the Nor'Westers, the Moss Men
- Founded: 1897
- Dissolved: 1902
- Ground: Viewhill Park
- Match secretary: Peter M'Kinnie, Thomas Ferguson
| to 1898 colours | from 1898 colours |

Longriggend Football Club was an association football club from Longriggend in Lanarkshire, active at the turn of the 20th century.

== History ==
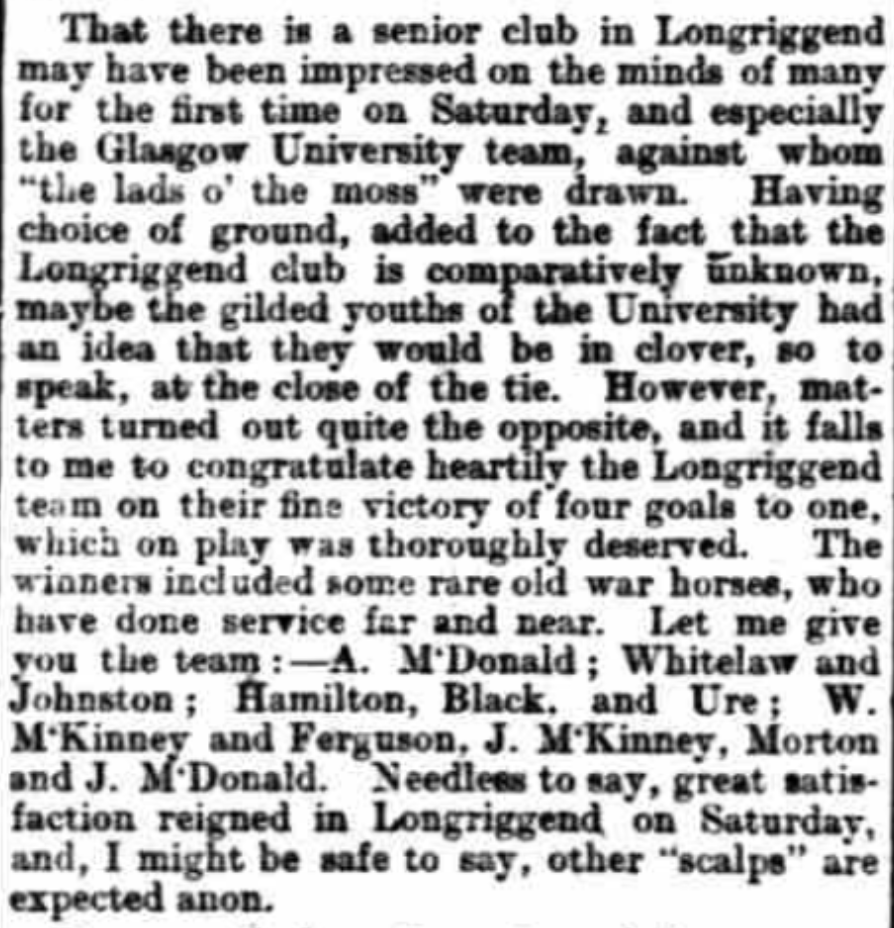
1899–1900 Scottish Qualifying Cup 1st Round, Longriggend 4–1 Glasgow University, Airdrie Advertiser, 16 September 1899

The first club in the village played in the Lanarkshire Cup from 1883 to 1888, and a junior club (the Wanderers) was active from 1891 until 1922. The instant club sprung out of another junior club, simply called Longriggend, in 1897 to enter senior football, being drawn in the Scottish Qualifying Cup before it had even joined the Lanarkshire Association. Somewhat against expectation the club beat the 1st Argyll and Sutherland Highlanders F.C. in the first round, but lost 3–0 to Albion Rovers in the second round, after which the club was indeed accepted into the Lanarkshire FA without opposition.

The club's first tilt at the Lanarkshire Cup that season ended at the first time of asking, with a predictable 5–1 loss at the Cup holders Airdrieonians, the home side taking matters "somewhat easily". That put Longriggend into the Consolation Cup (also known as the Coatbridge Express Cup after its sponsor), and, after a surprise replay win over Wishaw Thistle and a walkover when Royal Albert decided against the expense of a trip to Longriggend, found itself in the final, against Albion Rovers at Broomfield Park. To even greater surprise, Longriggend's "strong, bustling" style harassed the Rovers out of their game, and Longriggend took the trophy with a 3–1 win.

However the success had a deleterious effect on the club as its players were now ripe for poaching. For 1898–99 goalkeeper Hunter was enticed away by Albion Rovers and others had "scattered themselves far and wide", resulting in it scratching from the Qualifying and Lanarkshire Cups.

Although the club made tentative approaches to reverting to junior football in 1899, it remained a senior club, and fell one round short in the Qualifying Cup of making the Scottish Cup proper. After wins over Glasgow University and East Lanarkshire in a "very hard game", Longriggend lost 1–0 to Wishaw, and protested in vain about the eligibility of one of its players.

The club never got so close again, losing in the first round of the Qualifying Cup in the next two seasons to Carfin Emmet, the journey to and from the village of Carfin taking four hours by brake, and the scant gate ensuring the clubs only shared £5 gate money - less expenses. A win over Lanark in the Lanarkshire Cup in 1900–01, given the degraded nature of the senior game, put the club in the semi-final, against Motherwell. The game was a "tousy" affair, with Motherwell arriving at 'Riggend late, Motherwell losing Shields to injury soon after the start and Watt soon after the break, and Wilson (of the Fir Parkers) and Ure (of 'Riggend) were sent off for fighting. The loss of Ure proved pivotal, as Longriggend went from 1–0 up to 3–1 down, but referee Allison of Paisley ended the game early because of bad light, or "apparently scared at the jeering of the spectators". The tie was re-played, and again ended 3–1 to Motherwell, although this time the match was in much better temper.

The club's final appearance - or non-appearance - in competitive football was in the 1901–02 Lanarkshire Cup; having sold home advantage to Wishaw United, Longriggend did not turn up to the tie, wrongly assuming the pitch would be unplayable after a hard frost, and the tie was awarded to Thistle. The club dissolved before the 1902–03 season.

== Colours ==
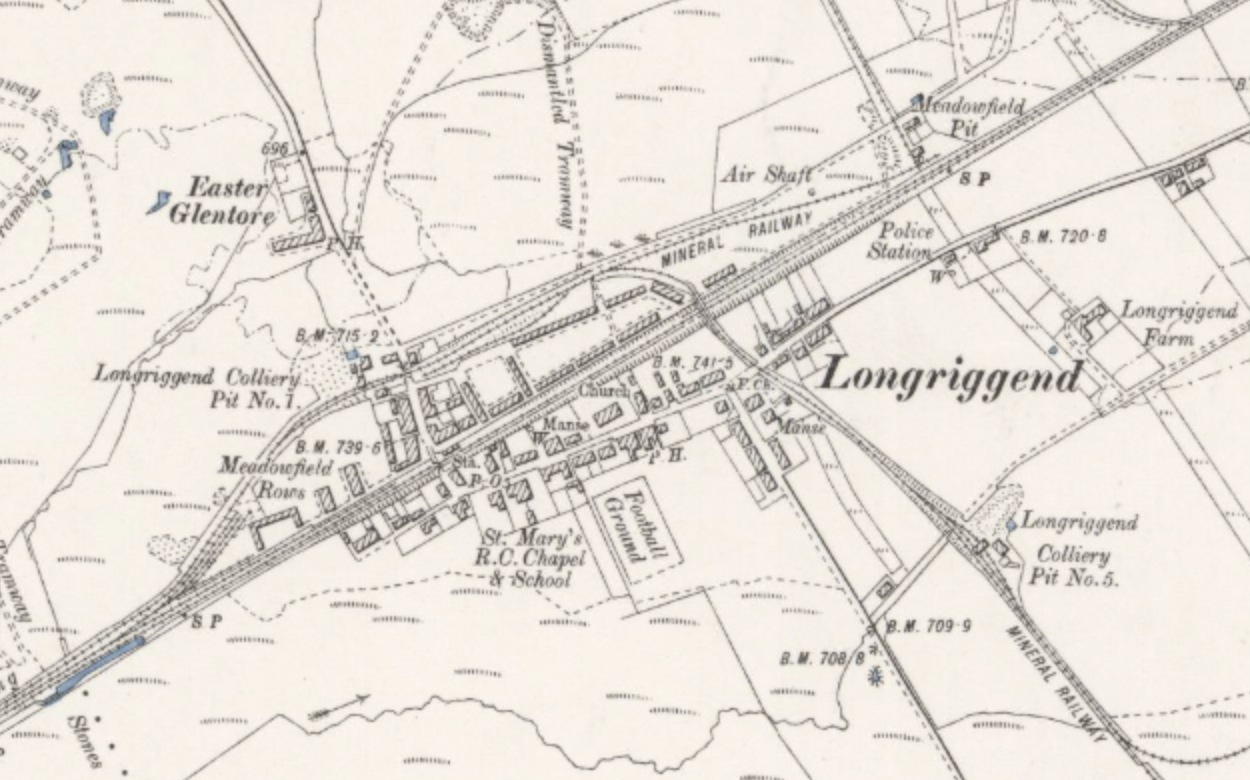
Lanarkshire Sheet III.SE 1896 extract, showing Longriggend and the location of the football ground

The club originally played in dark blue. In 1898 it changed to black and white stripes, which at the time referred to hoops, although in 1899 it seems to have reverted to blue.

== Ground ==
The club played at Viewhill Park. The largest recorded crowd was 500, for the Lanarkshire semi-final with Motherwell in February 1901.

== Honours ==
- Coatbridge Express Cup
  - Winner: 1897–98

== Notable players ==
- Hugh Morgan played for the junior side before joining Airdrieonians.
