= Glengowan F.C. =

Former association football club in Scotland

Glengowan
- Full name: Glengowan Football Club
- Nickname(s): the Glen
- Founded: 1876
- Dissolved: 1900
- Ground: Little Dumbreck
1879–84 colours	1894–1900 colours

Glengowan Football Club was a Scottish association football club based in the village of Caldercruix, Lanarkshire.

== History ==
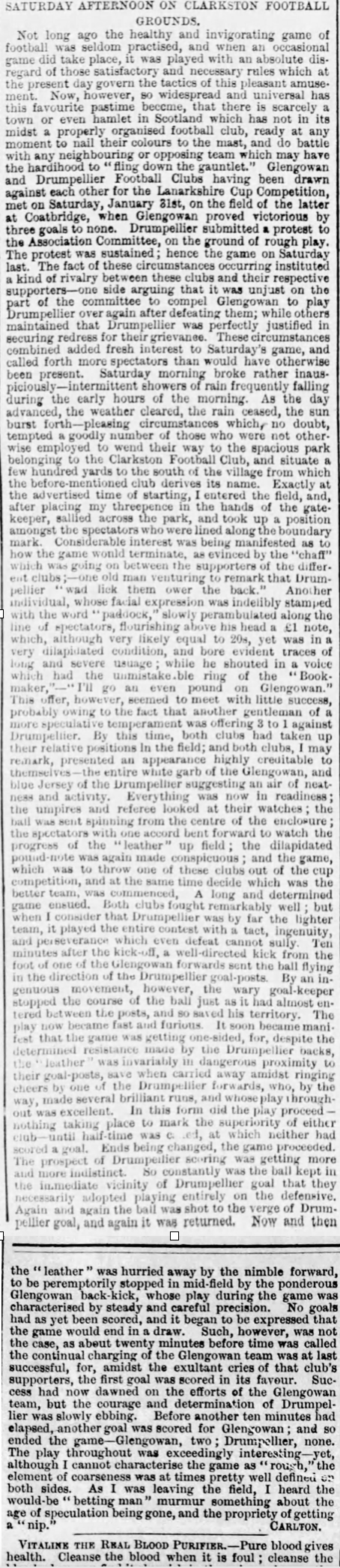
A colourful report of Glengowan's win over Drumpellier in the second round of the Lanarkshire Cup, 1879–80, from the Rutherglen Reformer, 21 February 1880

The club was formed in 1876, and was the works side from the Glengowan print works.

=== 1877–80: initial period of Scottish FA membership ===
Its first appearances of note were in the 1877–78 Scottish Cup. After two wins, the club played Drumpellier of Coatbridge in the third round. The tie resulted in two draws, although the replay at Caldercruix was only declared a 1–1 draw after a protest, as Drumpellier had been reported as 1–0 winners. Under the rules of the competition at the time, both clubs progressed to the fourth round of fixtures, made up of 19 clubs. Glengowan's run came to an end with a 5–0 defeat to South Western of Glasgow. It proved to be Glengowan's best Scottish Cup run, as teams with wider constituencies began to form and overtake a club restricted to a works membership.

In 1879, the club was one of the 16 founder members of the Lanarkshire Football Association. The association set up the first Lanarkshire Cup that season, Glengowan being one of the first entrants and reaching the quarter-final, losing 3–1 at eventual winners Stonelaw; with the game poised at 1–1, a right wing cross was sliced into his own goal by one of the Glengowan backs. The club had had to beat the Drumpellier twice in the second round, as Drumpellier protested against "the disgraceful nature" of Glengowan's play in the original tie; played at neutral ground in Clarkston, Glengowan scored twice in the second half in what was "undoubtedly a very fair exhibition of the game". The club would reach the quarter-final again in 1882–83, but only thanks to two byes.

=== 1880s: junior football ===
Glengowan remained a works team with a membership of 30, and let its Scottish Football Association membership lapse in the early 1880s, re-joining in 1884, still based at the print works; with 39 members it was still nevertheless dwarfed by most of the other senior sides in the county. It only stayed as a senior club for one season, albeit enjoying two wins in the national Cup before losing at Hibernian. In the Lanarkshire Cup, the club twice beat Dykehead in the first round, but both times a replay was ordered on the basis the referee was not properly appointed, and the tie proved to be third time lucky for Dykehead, winning 3–1.

=== 1890s: senior once more ===
Glengowan joined the SFA again in 1890. In its first season back as a senior club, Glengowan gained a bye and walkover in the Scottish Cup to face Airdrieonians in the third round, losing 8–0 (its record Scottish Cup defeat), despite fielding "several smart men" such as Derry, Graham, and Keys. Glengowan also reached the quarter-finals of the Lanarkshire Cup again, losing 1–0 at home to Albion Rovers in a match in which both sides protested the standard of the pitch before kick-off; the Rovers withdrew their protest after winning, but the referee's evidence caused a replay to be ordered, which Rovers won 3–1. Glengowan finished the season as runners-up in a four-team competition, the Cowans' Cup, presented by a furniture company to clubs in the Slamannan district, losing 3–1 to Slamannan F.C. in the final.

1890–91 was the club's last season in the major rounds of the Cup. It did not win a match in the preliminary rounds, which ran from 1891–92 to 1894–95. The club did win one tie in the Scottish Qualifying Cup, in 1895–96, 4–1 over the faded giants Cambuslang; Cambuslang protested on the basis that the pitch was not properly marked off, there were no corner flags, rough play caused Cambuslang two injuries, and "the field was not fit for a cup tie to take place on". The SFA dismissed the protest unanimously.

Seemingly as a last throw of the dice, Glengowan was one of five clubs to set up a second division in the Lanarkshire Football League in 1898–99, but it seems to have fizzled out without completing, and the obligations of league football - including guarantees for visiting clubs - left Glengowan "in a sorry state" by the end of April.

Glengowan's last Qualifying Cup tie was at home to a third incarnation of the Uddingston club in the first round in 1899–1900. Glengowan was narrowly ranked as favourite for the tie but went down to a 7–1 defeat. The club seems finally to have given up on football after losing to Motherwell in the Lanarkshire Cup in the same season; it only turned up to the tie with 9 men, having to press-gang a couple of substitutes, and scratched from the Consolation Cup. The club did finish on a high note, its last recorded fixture being a 4–1 win against a poorly-represented Armadale Daisy on 21 April 1900.

== Colours ==
The club wore the following:

- 1877–79: blue shirts with white knickers (originally described as "trousers".
- 1879–84: white shirts and knickers with black hose.
- 1884–85: black and white
- 1890–94: blue and white vertical stripes with blue knickers.
- 1894–1900: dark blue

== Grounds ==
The club played at Little Dumbreck, later known as Dumbreck Park, 10 minutes' walk from Caldercruix railway station.
