= Jimmy McCombe =

Scottish footballer

Personal information
- Place of birth: Bothwell, Scotland
- Height: 5 ft 9 in (1.75 m)
- Position: Winger

Senior career*
Years	Team	Apps	(Gls)
1931–1932	Bothwellhaugh A		
1932–1933	Wishaw Thistle		
1933–1934	Wishaw Juniors		
1934–1935	Heart of Midlothian	0	(0)
1935–1936	Clyde	6	(0)
1936	King's Park	7	(4)
1936–1938	Clapton Orient	50	(8)
1938–1939	Chelmsford City		
1939–1940	Dartford		
- * Club domestic league appearances and goals

W. James McCombe was a Scottish footballer who played as a winger.

== Career ==
McCombe began his career in 1931 with local club Bothwellhaugh A. Moves to Wishaw Thistle and Wishaw Juniors followed, before signing Heart of Midlothian in 1934. McCombe failed to break into the first team at Hearts (making one Scottish Cup appearance in 1935) and subsequently signed for Clyde in 1935, for whom he made his Scottish Football League debut. Later that year, McCombe joined King's Park. In 1936, McCombe signed for Clapton Orient. On 29 August 1936, McCombe made his debut for the club, scoring in a 1–1 draw at home to Crystal Palace. McCombe stayed at the club for two seasons, making 50 appearances, scoring eight times. In 1938, McCombe signed for newly formed Chelmsford City. In 1939, McCombe joined Dartford.

== Personal life ==
McCombe went by the name "Jimmy", a shortening of his middle name. His first initials were WJ.
