= Wishaw United F.C. =

Former association football club in Scotland

Wishaw United
- Full name: Wishaw United Club
- Nickname(s): the Wishawites
- Founded: 1900
- Dissolved: 1903
- Ground: Stenton Park
- President: James Alexander Smith
- Match secretary: Alex. Bain
Home colours

Wishaw United F.C. was a Scottish football team, from the town of Wishaw in Lanarkshire, which played in the Scottish Football Combination, a third-rank national league.

== History ==
The 1899–1900 season saw two professional football clubs in Wishaw, Wishaw F.C. and Wishaw Thistle, dividing the support and both struggling as a result. Meetings took place in April 1900 with a view to merging the two sides, and on the 30th the members resolved to form a new club, which, despite suggestions of retaining the simple Wishaw name, or adopting the name of the earlier Wishaw Swifts club, was named Wishaw United F.C.. Both clubs finished their respective seasons and clearing their debts to avoid any liabilities transferring over.

The United committee took care to point out that the new club was not assuming any of Thistle's current liabilities when it was chosen to replace it in the Combination. The club completed two seasons in the Combination, finishing 7th of 10 in 1900–01 and 3rd of 8 in 1901–02. the latter season also marked the club's best run in the Lanarkshire Cup, reaching the semi-finals, albeit after only winning one match as Longriggend F.C. did not appear for the quarter-final tie.

The club never reached the first round proper of the Scottish Cup, the regional nature of the qualifying competition meaning that the club was drawn against strong sides early on. In 1900–01 it was drawn to face Scottish League side Motherwell in the first round, and, after a replay, the third match was at the neutral venue of Douglas Park. United took the lead before 'Well recovered to win 3–1.

In 1901–02, the club caused an upset by knocking out Scottish League side Hamilton Academical by 4 goals to 1 – all the more remarkable for it being away from home – in the first qualifying round, before prevailing in the second against fellow Combination side Albion Rovers at the sixth time of asking, a record number of ties for the competition:

- 21 September 1901, at Rovers: 1–1, after Glover saved a Rovers penalty – the replay was to be played at Albion Rovers' Whifflet ground after the Rovers successfully protested about a United player (Thomas Baird) having committed a "professional irregularity";
- 28 September 1901, at Rovers: 0–0;
- 5 October 1901, at Wishaw: 2–2, after Rovers were 2–0 up at half-time;
- 12 October 1901, at Broomfield Park: 2–2 (a.e.t.), after Conlin of Rovers was sent off after 10 minutes, and Wishaw had a goal controversially disallowed at the end of extra-time;
- 19 October 1901, at Fir Park: 1–1 (a.e.t.);
- 26 October 1901, at Douglas Park: 2–1 (a.e.t.).

The clubs were meeting so often, usually in front of large crowds (such as 4,000 for the Broomfield Park match, of which 800 came from Wishaw), that there were suggestions that the clubs were playing out draws deliberately; the overall takings for the tie amounted to £429. United finally won the tie with an extra-time goal from Baird after Rovers had missed another penalty.

A week after the tie was finally decided, United visited Thornliebank F.C. in a tie that would decide who would play in the Scottish Cup proper, but the home side won 4–3, the cause being put down to Thornliebank's notoriously uneven pitch, so advantageous to the side familiar with it that Thornliebank had not been beaten at home all season.

The club did not complete the 1902–03 season. It lost to Academical in the first preliminary round of the Scottish Cup and to Dykehead in the first round of the Lanarkshire Cup. The defeat by Dykehead in February 1903 proved "literally [sic] the straw that broke the camel's back" and the club committee withdrew from the Combination, which had "not been a profitable competition". The club had played 12 of its scheduled 18 matches in the Combination, and Lanark F.C. took over the club's Combination fixtures, with United's secretary Alec Bain taking charge of operations.

== Colours ==
At the initial foundation meeting, the club adopted the same colours as Queen's Park.

== Grounds ==
The club played at Stenton Park. The ground was considered a "white elephant", causing the club to incur significant expense but never attracting the crowds the way Thistle's Old Public Park had done.

== Nickname ==
The media occasionally referred to the team as the Wishawites, while some of the older fans referred to the club as Thistle, or even Swifts, referring to the former town sides.
