= Andrew McGregor =

Scottish footballer

Personal information
- Full name: Andrew McGregor
- Date of birth: 1867
- Place of birth: Wishaw, Scotland
- Date of death: Unknown
- Position: Winger

Senior career*
Years	Team	Apps	(Gls)
-1890	Wishaw Thistle		
1890–1893	Notts County	44	(11)
- * Club domestic league appearances and goals

Andrew McGregor (1867 – unknown) was a Scottish footballer who played in the Football League for Notts County.
