= Pat Holton =

Scottish footballer

Personal information
- Full name: Patrick Carr Holton
- Date of birth: 23 December 1935
- Place of birth: Hamilton, Scotland
- Date of death: 19 December 2014 (aged 78)
- Place of death: Hamilton, Scotland
- Position: Left back

Youth career
- Douglas Water Thistle

Senior career*
Years	Team	Apps	(Gls)
1955–1956	Hamilton Academical	20	(0)
1956–1959	Motherwell	69	(0)
1959–1960	Chelsea	1	(0)
1960–1961	Southend United	11	(0)
1961–1962	St Johnstone	2	(0)
1962–1969	Hamilton Academical	129	(1)
- Wishaw
Total		232	(1)
- * Club domestic league appearances and goals

Patrick Carr Holton (23 December 1935 – 19 December 2014) was a Scottish footballer who played for Hamilton Academical, Motherwell, Chelsea, Southend United and St Johnstone.
