= Parkside, Shotts =

Football ground in Shotts, Scotland

Parkside
- Location within North Lanarkshire
- Location: Shotts, Scotland
- Coordinates: 55.8159°N 3.8096°W
- Surface: Grass
- Record attendance: 4,000

Tenant
- Dykehead

Parkside is a football ground in Shotts, Scotland. It was the home ground of Dykehead during their time in the Scottish Football League (SFL) between 1923 and 1926.

== History ==
Parkside was a basic ground, with the pavilion in the western corner of the pitch being its only structure. The probable record attendance of 4,000 was set for a Scottish Cup first round replay against Albion Rovers on 31 January 1920.

Dykehead were elected into the new Third Division of the SFL in 1923, and the first SFL match at Parkside was played on 25 August 1923, a 3–1 win over Galston. However, the Third Division was disbanded at the end of the 1925–26 season, with the final SFL match at the ground being played on 10 April 1926, a 2–2 draw with Solway Star.

Dykhead folded in 1928, and the ground was left to the YMCA in perpetuity; the site remains in use as a football pitch.
