= Billy Morrison (footballer) =

Scottish footballer

Personal information
- Date of birth: 25 June 1879
- Place of birth: West Benhar, Scotland
- Height: 5 ft 9 1/2 in (1.77 m)
- Position: Half-back

Youth career
- –1898: East Lanarkshire

Senior career*
Years	Team	Apps	(Gls)
1899–1902	West Calder Swifts		
1902–1904	St Bernard's	44	(1)
1904–1908	Fulham	122	(8)
1908–1910	Glossop		
1910–1912	Clyde	35	(5)
1912–1916	Raith Rovers	72	(4)
1915	→ St Bernard's (loan)	2	(0)
1915–1916	→ Morton (loan)	36	(0)
1916–1919	Morton	67	(2)
1919–1920	Falkirk		
- * Club domestic league appearances and goals

William Morrison (25 June 1879 – unconfirmed) was a Scottish footballer who played mainly as a midfielder (either right half or centre-half) for various British clubs.

He played for Fulham between 1904 and 1908, the period when they won the Southern Football League twice and were elected to the Football League, making 142 appearances and scoring nine goals for the club in all competitions. After returning to Scotland he appeared on the losing side in two consecutive Scottish Cup finals: in 1912, Clyde selected Morrison at centre forward to little effect as they lost 2–0 to Celtic, while in 1913 he was on defensive duties as Raith lost to Falkirk by the same scoreline. In his spell with Morton during the First World War (during which the Scottish Football League's top division continued to be contested), the Greenock club finished inside the top four places in four successive seasons, including runners-up to Celtic in 1916–17.
