= Wishaw Swifts F.C. =

Former association football club in Scotland

Wishaw Swifts
- Full name: Wishaw Swifts Football Club
- Nickname(s): the Swifts
- Founded: 1882?
- Dissolved: 1887
- Ground: Academy Park
Home colours

Wishaw Swifts F.C. was a Scottish football team, from the town of Wishaw in Lanarkshire. The club twice reached the last 20 of the Scottish Cup in the 1880s.

== History ==
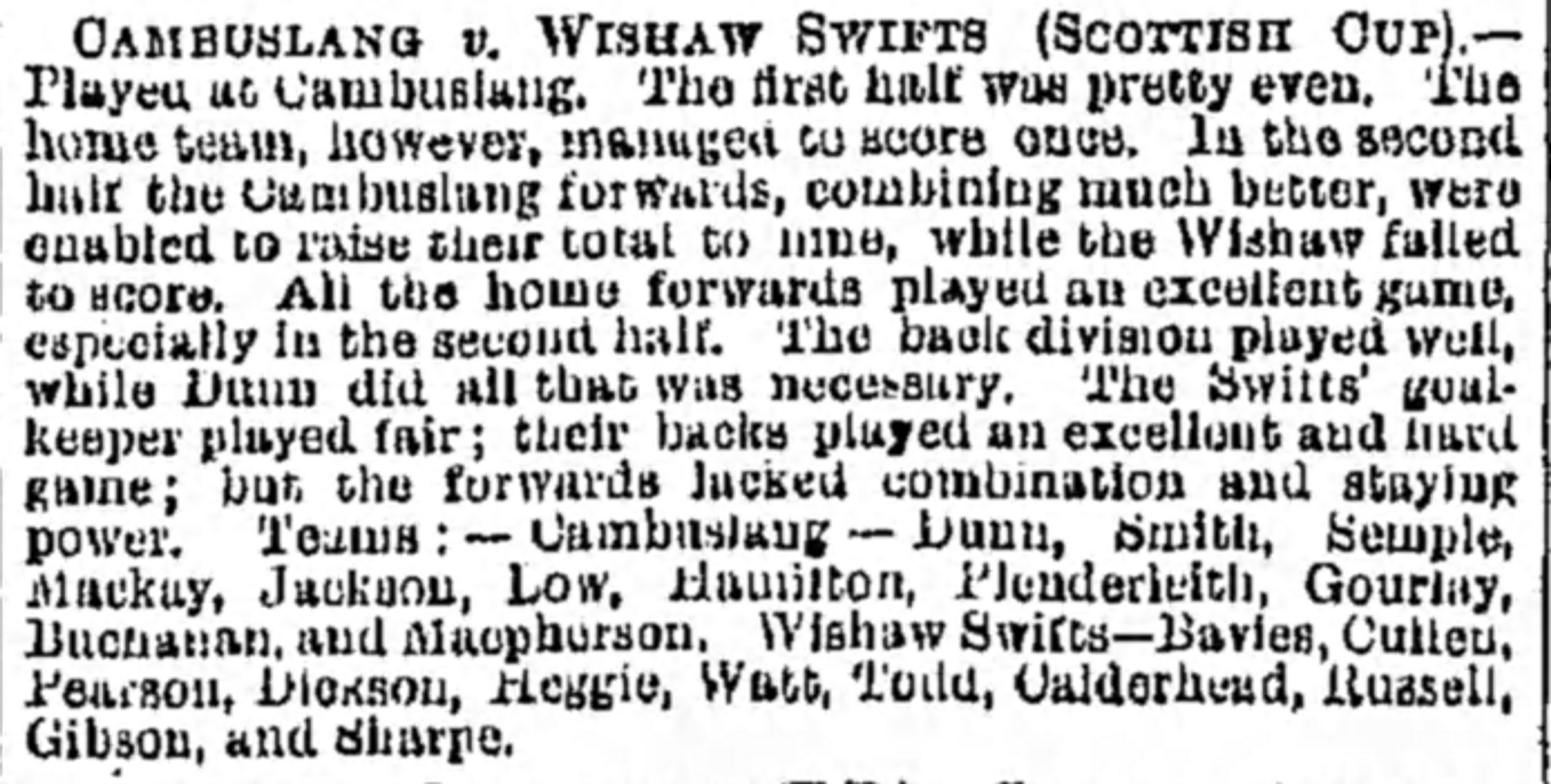
Cambuslang v Wishaw Swifts, Scottish Cup 4th round, 14 November 1885, from the Glasgow Herald two days later

The club gave its foundation date as 1882 and the first reported matches date from early 1883. Towards the end of the 1883–84 season, the club held up well in friendlies against the Lanarkshire Cup holders Cambuslang, only losing 3–1 despite two injuries, and 3rd Lanark R.V., only losing 2–0.

These results may have encouraged the club to try a more serious challenge, and in 1884–85 the club entered both the Scottish Cup and the Lanarkshire Cup for the first time. In the latter competition, the club beat Albion Rovers in the first round; that proved to be the club's only victory in the competition in its three entries.

The club had better results in the Scottish Cup, with wins over Dykehead (in a tie replayed after a Dykehead protest - the club increased its winning margin from 2–1 to 5–2), Airdriehill, and the original Dunfermline club taking the Swifts to the fourth round, made up of 20 clubs. In the fourth round, the club led Greenock Morton for much of the match, but conceded two quick goals with 15 minutes to go to go out 2–1. The club, which had the choice of ground, inadvertently handicapped itself by marking out a new pitch next to the one it had previously been using at Academy Park, so lost the advantage of knowing its peculiarities.

The club reached the same stage again in 1885–86 - this time made up of 19 clubs - beating Albion Rovers 5–0 in a replay en route to a tie with Cambuslang; the Rovers' protest against the Swifts' rough play and rough pitch markings was dismissed. At Cambuslang, although the Swifts kept the score down to 1–0 at half-time, Cambuslang scored eight further goals without reply in the second half.

The club had gained enough status to be invited to play in the Motherwell Charity Cup at the end of the season, but its semi-final tie with Motherwell Alpha ended in chaos, with the players and crowd fighting to such an extent that the police had to intervene. The Swifts felt it politic to withdraw.

The defeat to Cambuslang was the club's last Scottish Cup tie. An early sign of problems had emerged at the start of the season, as the second XI was effectively dissolved by being struck off the Second XI FA register. The Swifts entered for 1886–87 and was drawn to play at Hamilton Academical, but, despite adverts running on the day of the match itself, the Swifts scratched. Despite this, the club was apparently "very pleased for its prospects", but it did not see out the season. There was some talk of amalgamating with Wishaw Thistle F.C. during the season, but Thistle rejected any such moves. last reported game for the club was a 3–1 defeat to Dykehead in February 1887. The club appears to have been abandoned thereafter, with nobody arranging fixtures, players moving to Thistle, and before the 1887–88 season started the Scottish Football Association struck the club off for non-payment of subscriptions.

== Colours ==
The club played in blue shirts and white shorts.

== Grounds ==
The club played at Academy Park, on Stewarton Street; this may have been the same as the ground known as Thistle Park.

== Notable players ==
- David Calderhead, who played for the club from 1883 to 1885
