= James Hanning =

English footballer

Personal information
- Position: Inside forward

Senior career*
| Years | Team | Apps | (Gls) |
| 1897–1898 | Dalziel Rovers | | |
| 1898 | Sunderland | 1 | (0) |
| 1898–1899 | Hamilton Academical | | |
| 1899–1??? | Carfin Emmet | | |
- * Club domestic league appearances and goals

James Hanning was a professional footballer who played as an inside forward for Sunderland.
