= Ed McLaine =

Scottish-Canadian soccer player

Edward “Eddie” MacLaine
Personal information
- Full name: Edward MacLaine
- Date of birth: April 11, 1899
- Place of birth: Coatbridge, Scotland
- Date of death: June 14, 1972 (aged 73)
- Place of death: Lachine, Quebec Canada
- Position: Forward

Senior career*
| Years | Team | Apps | (Gls) |
| 1922–1923 | Albion Rovers | 9 | (0) |
| 1923–1924 | Dykehead | 1 | (0) |
| 1923–1924 | → Mid-Annandale (loan) | 12 | (6) |
- Grenadier Guards
- Montreal Maroons
- Montreal Carsteel
| 1926–1927 | Providence | 35 | (21) |
- Montreal Carsteel

International career
| 1925–1926 | Canada | 2 | (1) |
- * Club domestic league appearances and goals

Edward “Eddie” MacLaine (April 11, 1899 – June 14, 1972) was a Scottish-Canadian soccer player who earned two caps with Canada in 1925 and 1926. He played professionally in Canada and the American Soccer League. He was 73 years old when he died on June 14, 1972.

== Club career ==
MacLaine began his career in his native Scotland with Albion Rovers, Dykehead and Mid-Annandale. In 1924, he moved to Canada where he played for four teams: Grenadier Guards, Montreal Maroons, Montreal Carsteel and Montreal Vickers. He briefly moved south to join Providence of the American Soccer League. In his first year in the league, he scored twenty-one goals in thirty-two league games. In 1927, he began the season with Providence, played three games, then left the team to return to Canada. After his return, he played for Carsteel in 1930 and 1931. In 1931, Montreal Carsteel went to the finals of the National Soccer League; Although McLaine scored two goals, Carsteel fell to Toronto Scottish.

== International career ==
On June 27, 1926, MacLaine scored the only goal as Canada defeated the United States.

== Executive ==
In 1950, MacLaine was the vice-president of the Quebec Soccer Federation.
