= Stonelaw F.C. =

Former association football club in Scotland

Stonelaw
- Full name: Stonelaw F.C.
- Founded: 1875
- Dissolved: 1881
- Ground: Burnside Park
Home colours

Stonelaw Football Club was a Scottish football team located in the town of Rutherglen, Lanarkshire, Scotland.

== History ==
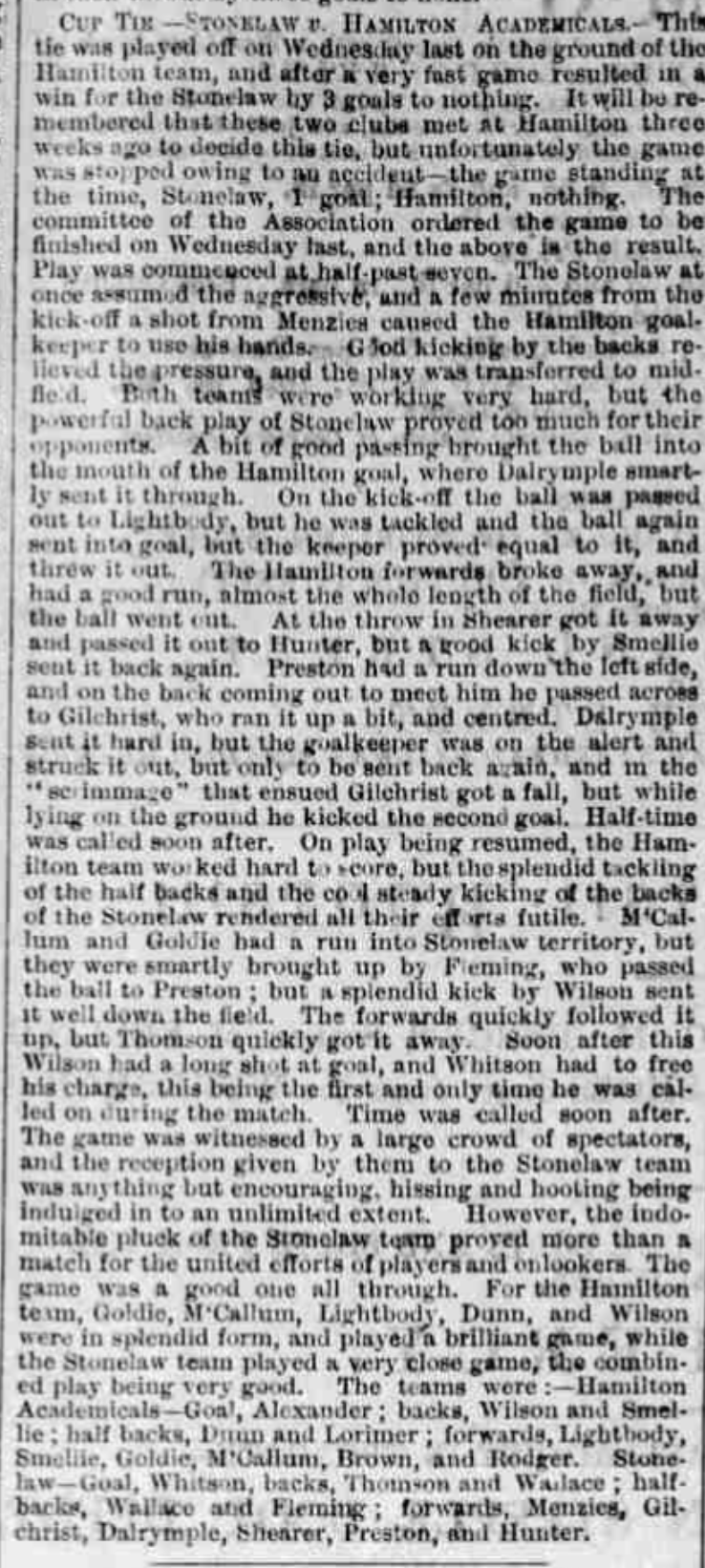
1879–80 Lanarkshire Cup semi-final, Hamilton Academical 0–3 Stonelaw, Rutherglen Reformer, 29 May 1880

The club was founded in 1875 and may have taken its name from Stonelaw Tower in Rutherglen, or from one of the coal mining pits of that name in the local area (one located below the tower). Stonelaw's first known matches come from the 1875–76 season and it entered the Scottish Cup for the first time in 1876–77. The club easily beat Shotts at home in the first round, but lost 4–0 at home to Arthurlie in the second; the club being so little-known that the Glasgow Herald referred to the team as "Stonehouse".

Stonelaw's best Scottish Cup run came in 1878–79, being one of the final ten clubs left in the competition. The club beat the original East Kilbride club 4–0 at home in the first round, the Stonelaw goalkeeper not having a save to make. The club was still so low-key that the national newspapers did not refer to its second or third round wins over Hamilton Academical and Clarkston respectively. The club's run looked as if it had ended with a 2–0 defeat at Thistle of south Glasgow. However, Partick, whom Thistle had beaten in the third round, had put in a protest about Thistle, for using three players who had already played for another side in the Glasgow Cup, which made them cup-tied for all competitions; the Scottish Football Association upheld the protest when drawing the fifth round ties. In the fifth round, the club lost 9–1 at home to Dumbarton, a result so expected that none of the newspapers remarked on it.

Clarkston gained revenge over Stonelaw in the first round of the 1879–80 with a 2–1 win, the first goal scored after the goalkeeper dropped the ball when charged by Forsyth, and Sturton poking the loose ball home. A month later, the club was one of the 16 founder members of the Lanarkshire Football Association, finishing third in the balloting for membership on the executive committee.

The association set up the first Lanarkshire Cup that season, and Stonelaw became the first Lanarkshire champions. Unusually, Stonelaw played Hamilton Academical in two rounds of the competition, as the rules of the competition followed those of the Scottish Cup, in that, if clubs drew twice, they both advanced to the next drawing, and the clubs played out two draws in the second round. The clubs met again three rounds later, in the semi-final, the original attempt at playing out the tie being abandoned just before half-time (with Stonelaw 1–0 up) because of a broken leg to the Acas' Alexander Brown, and with Stonelaw already down to ten men because of an injury to Gilchrist. Stonelaw returned to Hamilton for a replay and won 3–0.

The final was also played at the Acas' ground, against Shotts, and Stonelaw took the lead through an own goal, Menzies securing the game with a second before half-time. There was however some dark whispering that Stonelaw had relied on seven guest players for the final, and, perhaps backing up those rumours, the club never seems to have played a competitive match again; it scratched from its defence of the trophy and from its final two Scottish Cup entries. The name was revived in 1887 briefly by a new club which included Stonelaw's goalkeeper Gilzean in its new incarnation.

== Colours ==
The club wore blue jerseys, white knickers, and blue hose, with a Victoria cross on the shirt.

== Ground ==
The club played at Burnside Park.
