= Scottish Football Alliance =

Former association football league in Scotland

The Scottish Football Alliance was a league football structure set up in Scotland in competition with the Scottish Football League. Its success in the early years of professional football in both England and Scotland made the Alliance the basis for a second division in both countries. The Alliance attracted a number of Junior clubs to the League system, which boosted its future viability.

== 1891–97 ==
Originally founded in 1891 to rival the League, the Scottish Alliance was one of a number of leagues set up a year after the Scottish Football League was formed. The idea came from five Glaswegian clubs - Clyde, Linthouse, Thistle, Partick Thistle, and Northern - and other clubs from around the region were invited, the initial membership eventually including Airdrieonians, Ayr, East Stirlingshire, Morton, Kilmarnock, King's Park, Port Glasgow Athletic, and St Bernard's, although Clyde dropped out. Two other clubs (Leith Athletic F.C. and Aberdeen) also pledged to join but dropped out; Queen's Park F.C. turned down an invitation.

In 1892, several clubs left and the league was reconstituted with a smaller membership; the league decided to reduce to 10 clubs, and, with 2 vacancies, attracted applications from nine clubs. St Bernard's – who had sought to leave – was re-elected, and Vale of Leven were also elected; the disappointed clubs were Albion Rovers, Arthurlie, East Stirlingshire, Hurlford, Morton, Port Glasgow Athletic, and Glasgow Wanderers.

In 1893 a number of clubs returned, but during the summer, the Alliance became the backbone of the new Second Division of the Scottish League. The league, bolstered by the inclusion of a number of clubs from the Scottish Football Federation, continued for four more years by recruiting new members. One candidate club, Gaelic of Coatbridge, was advised to improve the quality of its pitch to gain admission in 1895, but lost its ground entirely and was wound up.

=== Champions ===
- 1891–92 Linthouse
- 1892–93 Cowlairs
- 1893–94 Royal Albert
- 1894–95 Wishaw Thistle
- 1895–96 Wishaw Thistle
- 1896–97 Third Lanark "A"

=== Membership ===
- Airdrieonians 1891–94
- Albion Rovers 1893–96
- Arthurlie 1893–96
- Ayr 1891–92
- Blantyre Victoria 1895–97
- Burnbank Swifts 1895–96
- Cambuslang 1892–93, 1894–97
- Cameronians 1896–97
- Clyde "A" 1896–97
- Cowlairs 1892–93
- Dykehead 1895–96
- East Stirlingshire 1891–92
- Hamilton Academical 1894–96
- Johnstone 1894–95
- Kilmarnock 1891–93
- King's Park 1891–92
- Linthouse 1891–93
- Morton 1891–92
- Neilston 1895–96
- Northern 1891–93, 1896–97 (resigned during the season)
- Partick Thistle 1891–93
- Port Glasgow Athletic 1891–92
- Royal Albert 1893–96
- St Bernard's 1891–93
- Third Lanark "A" 1896–97
- Thistle 1891–93
- Vale of Leven 1892–93
- Wishaw Thistle 1893–96

== 1905–06 ==
The Scottish Alliance was reformed for a season in 1905–06. However it was unfinished and was eventually superseded by the creation of the Scottish Football Union.

=== Membership ===
- Bo'ness
- Broxburn
- Broxburn Shamrock
- Heart of Midlothian "A"
- King's Park
- Rangers "A"
- St Mirren "A"

== 1919–38 ==
In 1919, the Scottish Alliance was re-formed for a second time, principally as a reserve team league for Scottish Football League First Division clubs. Not all of the First Division clubs fielded a reserve team due to the additional costs involved. In 1932–33 season they were joined by Beith, Galston and Bo'ness, who were unable to pay their opponents match guarantees. From 1920, it had a policy of including at least one non-reserve team. On the collapse of the Scottish Football League Third Division in 1926, a large number of clubs found a place in the Alliance. So much so that for one season the competition was split into regional sections. This split lasted only one season, after which the Alliance was amalgamated again into one division.

In 1938, the First Division clubs decided to create a formal league for reserve teams, which meant that Beith and Galston had to be expelled because they were first teams. It also meant that Dundee's reserve team were expelled; as the club had been relegated from the First Division but had still maintained a reserve team in the Alliance.

=== Champions ===
- 1919–20 Kilmarock "A"
- 1920–21 St Mirren "A"
- 1921–22 Celtic "A"
- 1922–23 Airdrieonians "A"
- 1923–24 Rangers "A"
- 1924–25 Heart of Midlothian "A"
- 1925–26 Airdrieonians "A"
- 1926–27 East – Heart of Midlothian "A" (Overall champions) West – Airdrieonians "A"
- 1927–28 Rangers "A"
- 1928–29 Rangers "A"
- 1929–30 Rangers "A"
- 1930–31 Rangers "A"
- 1931–32 Rangers "A"
- 1932–33 Aberdeen "A"
- 1933–34 Celtic "A"
- 1934–35 Rangers "A"
- 1935–36 Aberdeen "A"
- 1936–37 Celtic "A"
- 1937–38 Celtic "A"

=== Membership ===
- Aberdeen "A" 1920–38
- Airdrieonians "A" 1921–34
- Albion Rovers "A" 1920–23
- Arbroath 1920–21
- Ayr United "A" 1919–32, 1937–38
- Beith 1926–27, 1928–38
- Bo'ness 1933–34
- Brechin City 1926–27, 1928–29
- Broxburn United 1926–27
- Celtic "A" 1919–22, 1930–38
- Clyde "A" 1919–21
- Clydebank "A" 1919–20, 1921–22, 1925–26
- Cowdenbeath "A" 1924–26, 1931–32
- Dumbarton "A" 1921–22
- Dykehead 1926–27
- Dundee "A" 1920–24, 1925–28, 1930–32, 1934–38
- Dundee Hibernian 1922–23
- Falkirk "A" 1921–22, 1923–30, 1931–32, 1936–38
- Forfar Athletic 1920–21
- Galston 1932–38
- Hamilton Academical "A" 1921–22, 1929–38
- Heart of Midlothian "A" 1921–38
- Helensburgh 1926–27
- Hibernian "A" 1920–22, 1925–31, 1933–38
- Johnstone 1926–27
- Kilmarnock "A" 1919–38
- Leith Athletic 1923–24, 1926–27
- Lochgelly United 1926–27
- Mid-Annandale 1926–27
- Montrose 1926–27, 1928–29
- Morton "A" 1920–21, 1927–28, 1930–32
- Motherwell "A" 1919–22, 1926–38
- Nithsdale Wanderers 1928–30
- Partick Thistle "A" 1919–38
- Peebles Rovers 1926–27
- Queen of the South "A" 1924–27, 1933–38
- Queen's Park Strollers 1920–38
- Raith Rovers "A" 1921–23, 1924–25, 1927–28
- Rangers "A" 1919–38
- Royal Albert 1926–27
- St Johnstone "A" 1925–30, 1933–38
- St Mirren "A" 1919–24, 1925–38
- Solway Star 1926–27
- Third Lanark "A" 1920–25, 1928–29, 1931–34, 1936–38
- Vale of Leven 1926–27

== 1939–40 ==
In 1939 the Scottish Alliance was re-formed by Babcock & Wilcox, Galston, Girvan Athletic, Nithsdale Wanderers, Queen's Park Strollers, Stranraer and Vale of Leven but disbanded after only a couple of games because of World War II.

== 1956–57 ==
In 1956–57, six reserve sides formed a new Alliance – Dumbarton, St Johnstone, Clyde, Dundee United, Third Lanark, and Queen's Park Victoria XI. Cowdenbeath came in for the Spring tournament.

== See also ==
- Defunct leagues in Scottish football
