= Dykehead F.C. =

Former association football club in Scotland

Dykehead
- Full name: Dykehead Football Club
- Nickname: the Dykies
- Founded: 1880
- Dissolved: 1928
- Ground: Parkside, Shotts
Home colours

Dykehead Football Club was a football club based in the Dykehead area of Shotts, playing their home games at Parkside. The club were members of the Scottish Football League Third Division.

== History ==
The early history of the club is somewhat shrouded in mystery, although it was formed in 1880 and played its first match on 29 May 1880, a 4–0 defeat to West Calder. It made its competitive debut in the 1881–82 Lanarkshire Cup, holding the senior side Glengowan to a draw in the first round before going down in the replay.

In the 1883–84 season, the club caused a major surprise by reaching the final of the Lanarkshire Cup, but lost 4–0 against Cambuslang in the final at the Airdrie Cricket Ground. Off the back of this success, the club joined Scottish Football Association in August 1884. The club duly made its Scottish Cup debut in 1884–85, originally losing 2–1 at Wishaw Swifts in the first round; the Dykies protested on the basis that the pitch was a mere 96 yards long, and the Scottish FA considered disqualifying the Swifts, but ultimately ordered a replay at Shotts, which the Swifts won 5–2.

The club competed in the Scottish Football Alliance in 1894–95, the season being derailed by a miners' strike which affected the club's home matches, and in 1899 with five other clubs tried to form a second division of the Lanarkshire League, although the clubs did not complete their fixtures. The club spent the 1904–05 season in the Eastern Football League, and found a more permanent pre-war berth in the Scottish Football Union, which the Dykies won in 1912–13; although the fixtures were not completed, Dykehead's 17 points from 9 games were enough for the committee to declare the club as champion.

Dykehead eventually ended up in the Western League, which was incorporated by the Scottish Football League as its new Third Division for the 1923–24 season. Dykehead lasted the Division's three seasons, finishing 5th, 12th and 4th, and in the 1924–25 season had its best run in the Scottish Cup, reaching the third round.

The Scottish League abandoned the third division after the 1925–26 season, and Dykehead was cast out. Dykehead spent the following season in the Scottish Football Alliance (now much reduced in status), suffering a loss of £409, and then spent 1927–28 in the Provincial League. With losses unsustainable, the club resolved to quit the senior game, and decided (by a vote of 18 to 14) to join an Intermediate competition run by Scottish Junior Football Association from the 1928–29 season, but the move proved futile. Dykehead lost in the first round of the Scottish Junior Cup, and the Lanarkshire League complained that the club was being admitted to the wrong competition, with the result that at the end of September 1928 the directors resolved to wind up the club.

== Colours ==
The club's traditional colours were black and white, worn as hooped shirts from 1884 to 1888 and in the early 20th century, and as stripes at other times. From 1894 to 1898 the club wore white jerseys with blue serge knickers. In 1925–26 it wore blue jerseys for league matches.

== Ground ==
They played originally played at Youngston Park, By 1893 the club was playing at M'Nair's Park and in 1894 moved to Dykehead Park.

The club was playing at Craigmillar Park by 1897, and found a more permanent home at Parkside when looking to take East of Scotland League football in 1903. After the club's demise, the ground was gifted to the YMCA.

== Former players ==
1. Players that have played/managed in the Football League or any foreign equivalent to this level (i.e. fully professional league).
2. Players with full international caps.
3. Players that hold a club record or have captained the club.

- (Scotland) Tommy Davidson
- (Canada) Ed McLaine
