= Wishaw Thistle F.C. =

Former association football club in Scotland

Wishaw Thistle
- Full name: Wishaw Thistle Football Club
- Nickname: the Jags
- Founded: 1884
- Dissolved: 1900
- Ground: Old Public Park
- Capacity: c. 5,000
Home colours

Wishaw Thistle F.C. was a Scottish football team, from the town of Wishaw in Lanarkshire. The club played in the Scottish Cup and subsidiary League competitions in the 1890s, and came within one vote of joining the Scottish League, but was wound up in 1900.

== History ==
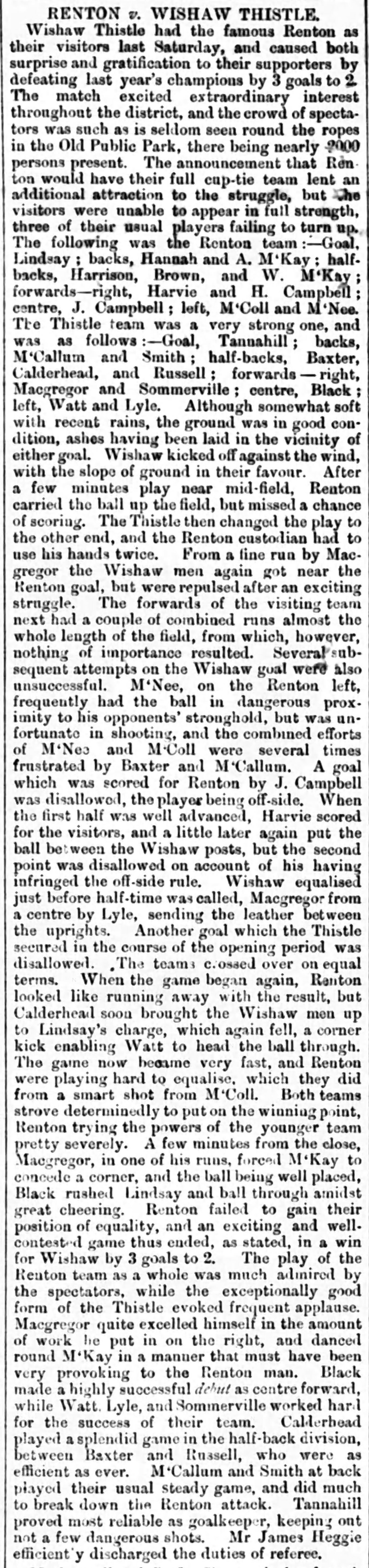
Report of Wishaw Thistle 3–2 Renton, 26 January 1889, from the 2 February 1889 edition of the Wishaw Press

The first reference to the club is ia match against Berryhill Athletic at the end of the 1883–84 season. By the end of the 1884–85 season, it felt strong enough to challenge the senior Wishaw Swifts, but the latter club - despite "very poor" play - was still able to win 5–0.

=== Junior successes ===
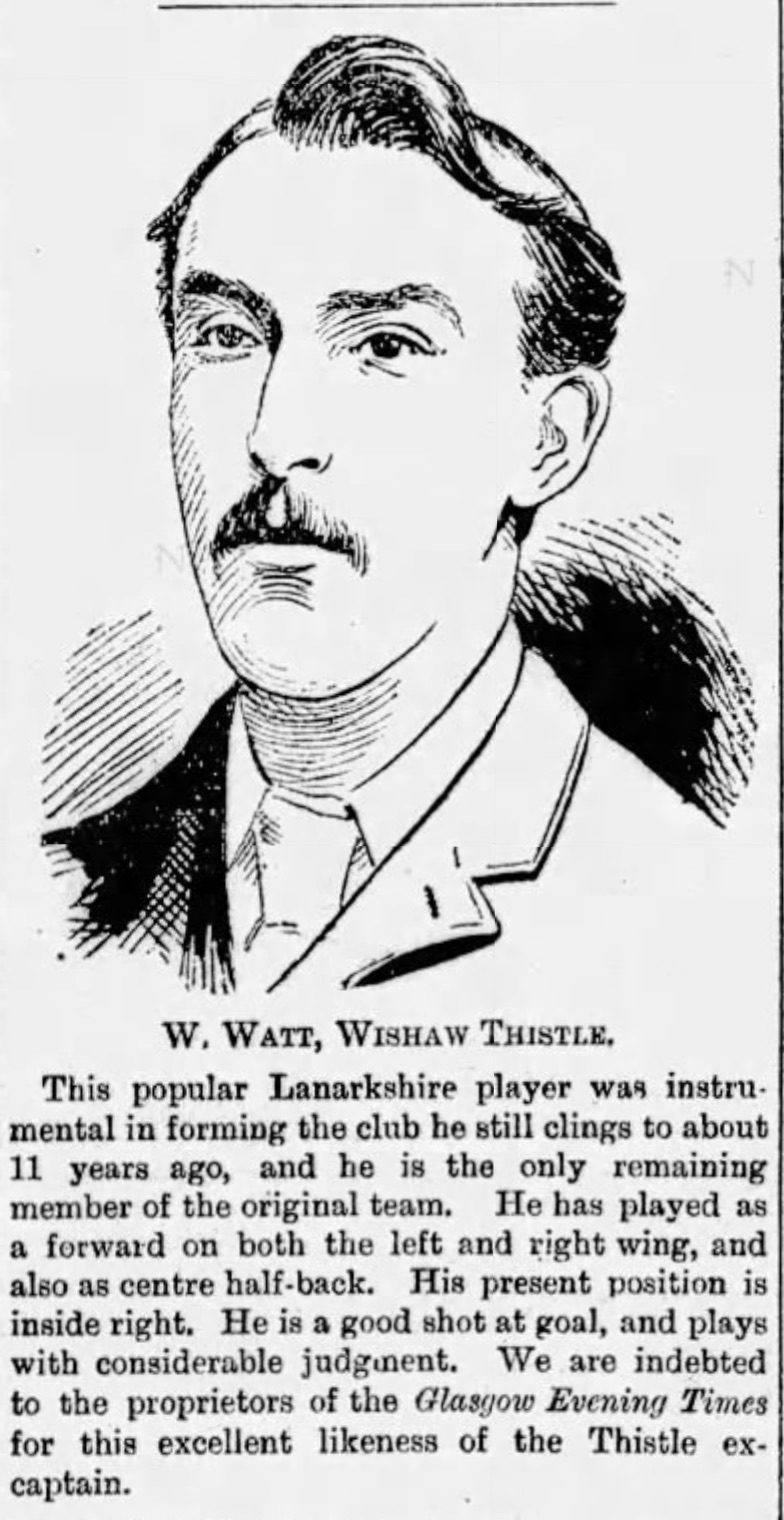
W Watt, Wishaw Thistle F.C., The Reformer, 24 October 1890

The Thistle was originally a Junior club and won the Lanarkshire Junior Cup competition in 1885–86, 1886–87, and 1887–88, the first of the finals seeing the Thistle hammer Hamilton West End 7–1.

In 1887–88 the club won the second edition of the Scottish Junior Cup. The final against Maryhill F.C. needed three games to decide it. Wishaw won the first match, returning from the final venue in Larkhall to the town accompanied by two brass bands celebrating the win, but Maryhill protested about "rough play, full time not having been played, and a goal obtained by Wishaw being off-side". The Scottish Junior FA decided that there had been encroachment by the crowd - around half of whom entered free of charge owing to a failure in organization - and ordered a replay, thanks to the casting vote of the FA President Mr Crawford, who decided he would be referee for the replay. Before the second game could take place, Wishaw had the final of the Lanarkshire competition against Blantyre Thistle to play, which it won 3–2, but Thistle lost the national final 2–1. However, Thistle put in a protest, which was upheld, and finally took the trophy with a 3–1 win at Ibrox Park, having been behind at half-time.

=== Senior club ===
With no more challenge in the Junior game, the club turned Senior for the 1888–89 season. It entered the Scottish Cup for the first time but lost in the first round 4–2 at home to Cambuslang, who had been runners-up the previous season. The club also entered the Lanarkshire Cup for the first time, losing to Carfin Shamrock in the second round. The highlight of the season however was a surprise win in a friendly against Scottish Cup holders - and de facto world champions - Renton, by 3–2, in front of 2,000 at Old Public Park; Renton played with 8 of its Cup-winning team.

The club reached the third round of the Scottish Cup in 1889–90 and 1890–91, which was the furthest the club would reach in the competition. In the former year the club beat Hamilton Academical 5–0 in the first round and drew a bye in the second, before hosting Linthouse in the third in front of a crowd of 2,000. A remarkable game saw the Jags win the toss and, contrary to expectations, play into the wind in the first half, but the decision seemed justified with a goal soon after the start; however, by half-time, the visitors had taken a 6–1 lead, which became 7–1 from the start of the second half after a "suspiciously offside" goal. For the next 25 minutes, Wishaw "completely hemmed in" the Linties and brought the score back to 7–5, but a breakaway goal for Linthouse disheartened the home side and finished the scoring. The club's run in the Lanarkshire Cup in 1889–90 ended in bizarre fashion; after three draws with Carfin Shamrock, and the competition bogged down with outstanding ties, Wishaw proposed re-drawing the second round in toto, and, when that was voted down, withdrew.

1890–91 was the final year the Scottish Cup did not have qualifying rounds. The Jags caused a surprise in the first round by knocking out the 'other' Jags of Partick Thistle, coming from 2–1 down to win 3–2 late on, but the club was unlucky with the third round draw, hosting the newly-dominant Celtic, who won 6–2.

=== Finding a league ===
The formation of the Scottish League was a blow to many of the smaller town clubs in Scotland, depriving them of friendlies and Cup ties, especially after the institution of qualifying rounds for the Cup, and the legalization of professionalism made it very difficult for such clubs to compete. Thistle was not invited to join Scottish Football Alliance, but was invited to apply for membership of the Scottish Football Federation, and its application was successful. The club played in the Federation for its two seasons of existence (1891–92 and 1892–93), with mid-table finishes on each occasion.

The latter season saw the club's greatest Senior Cup honour, as it won the Lanarkshire Cup for the only time, beating Royal Albert 4–1 in the final. Thistle had lost to Airdrieonians in the final the previous season, but, after a dispute with the FA, the Airdrie side withdrew from the competition for 1892–93. The final, at Dalziel Park in Motherwell, was watched by a crowd of 4,000, and Thistle's goals included two "rushes" where the combined strength of the Jags' forwards carried the ball, and the goalkeeper, over the line.

With the Federation dissolving in 1893, Thistle sought to join the Scottish League, but could not find a seconder to support its application. The club therefore joined the Alliance, although the competition had been denuded by most of the clubs being absorbed into the new Scottish League Second Division. The 1893–94 season saw Thistle finish just above the bottom, but the club won the title in 1894–95 and 1895–96, in the former season coming out on top of an 8 team league, 7 of whom would play Scottish League football. After both seasons, Thistle renewed its application to join the League; its 1895 application fell short, but in 1896 the club tied for the third available place with Linthouse, which was seeking re-election, and on a second vote lost out by 21 votes to 19.

The club would never apply again. The Alliance was reduced the following season to a rump of clubs by another mass exodus, including Thistle, to the new Scottish Football Combination for 1896–97. However Thistle's success had meant the club was picked apart by clubs in the Football League and Scottish League, and the club finished bottom twice in its four seasons in the Combination.

=== The end of the club ===
The club's small crowds were causing financial issues for the club; the club made a financial loss when winning the Alliance in 1896, and the local newspaper warned that "unless there is an increased support, it will be almost impossible for Wishaw Thistle to exist as a club". By 1898, the Thistle was struggling to pay players, and in December 1898 several players refused to turn out for the club in a Lanarkshire Cup match with Royal Albert, because it was unable to offer an increase in wages. As part of the fall-out some players were suspended and others transferred. There was some consolation for Thistle at the end of the season, as the club won the Coatbridge Express Trophy, which was a consolation tournament for those knocked out of the Lanarkshire Cup before the final.

A new senior club - simply named Wishaw - was founded in June 1899, its foundation being the result of the Junior side Wishaw Victoria wishing to use the Wishaw Cycling Club's Belhaven Park pitch over the winter, and deciding to turn Senior. Its formation was a mutually destructive move; the new club signed up a number of expensive players, but crowd sympathies lay with Thistle, who attracted the higher crowds. In 1899–1900, Thistle hosted Wishaw in the Scottish Cup first qualifying round in "the tit-bit of the whole round" and, before 2,000 spectators, the new club won 1–0; Thistle lost regular player Nelson on the eve of the match as he had signed for Reading. Thistle protested on the basis that Joseph Donaldson of Wishaw had played for Stevenston Thistle F.C. in the close season, so was not eligible for Wishaw, but the protest was dismissed, witnesses not coming up to proof and the chairman saying "a worse protest had never come before the Association".

The mutually destructive presence of a rival club, and the consequent difficulties for both, made it obvious that two town clubs could not continue. Thistle suffered a further blow with the loss of the Old Public Park to a new road in March. Meetings took place in April 1900 with a view to merging the two sides, and on the 30th the members resolved to form a new club, Wishaw United F.C., adopting the Queen's Park colours of black and white hoops, but with both clubs finishing their respective seasons and clearing their debts to avoid any liabilities transferring over.

The last competitive match for Thistle was a 6–0 Combination defeat at home to Thornliebank F.C. in May 1900. The new club was elected to replace Thistle in the Combination, the United committee being careful to note that it was not taking over Thistle's existing liabilities.

The name was revived in 1906 by the Wishaw Amateurs club.

== Colours ==
The club initially played in striped shirts, leading to a nickname of the Stripes. By 1888 the club had changed to "dark maroon", and by 1892 had adopted white shirts and navy blue shorts. From 1898 to 1900 it played in blue, but at the end of February 1900 introduce d a new "smart and dainty" kit of red and white stripes with white knickers.

== Grounds ==
The club's first ground was known as Thistle Park, and was on Stewarton Street, with an entrance by Academy Road. From 1888 the club played at the Old Public Park. For the Scottish Cup tie with Celtic, a temporary grandstand was erected.

The Jags' match against Kilbarchan F.C. in the Combination in March 1900 was the club's last on its old pitch, as demolition work started in order to build a new road through the middle. The club managed to rent some spare space between the old pitch and some ponds, as a temporary measure while the club looked for a new ground; the greater incline was described as a "kopje", while the pitch surface described as "rig and fur".

== Notable players ==
- Willie Naughton, played for the club in 1890
- Willie McCallum, Celtic player, who had two spells with the club
- Willie Michael, who played for the club from 1890 to 1893
- Andrew McCreadie, who played for the club in 1899–1900
- Andrew McGregor, FA Cup finalist with Notts County, played for the club before moving to England

== Honours ==
Scottish Football Alliance

- Champions: 1894–95, 1895–96

Lanarkshire Cup

- Winners: 1892–93
- Runners-up: 1891–92, 1896–97

Scottish Junior Cup

- Winners: 1887–88

Lanarkshire Junior Cup

- Winners: 1885–86, 1886–87, 1887–88
