= Lanarkshire Cup =

Annual football competition in Scotland

- Sport: football
- Founded: 1879
- Folded: 1996
- No. of teams: various from Lanarkshire
- Country: Scotland
- Confederation: UEFA
- Last champion: Motherwell F.C. (40th title)
- Most titles: Motherwell F.C. (40 titles)

The Lanarkshire Cup was an annual competition open to football teams in the Lanarkshire area. The competition is now defunct. The Lanarkshire FA was dissolved in June 1999 when it was merged with the Ayrshire and Renfrewshire FAs to form the West of Scotland FA. This was because the memberships of these associations had fallen below the 7-club threshold placed on them by the Scottish FA.

== List of winners ==
1879–80 - Stonelaw
1880–81 - Thistle
1881–82 - Hamilton Academical
1882–83 - West Benhar
1883–84 - Cambuslang
1884–85 - Cambuslang
1885–86 - Airdrieonians
1886–87 - Airdrieonians
1887–88 - Airdrieonians
1888–89 - Royal Albert
1889–90 - Royal Albert
1890–91 - Airdrieonians
1891–92 - Airdrieonians
1892–93 - Wishaw Thistle
1893–94 - Royal Albert
1894–95 - Motherwell
1895–96 - Royal Albert
1896–97 - Airdrieonians
1897–98 - Airdrieonians
1898–99 - Motherwell
1899–1900 - Albion Rovers
1900–01 - Motherwell
1901–02 - Hamilton Academical
1902–03 - Airdrieonians
1903–04 - Airdrieonians
1904–05 - Hamilton Academical
1905–06 - Hamilton Academical
1906–07 - Motherwell
1907–08 - Motherwell
1908–09 - Airdrieonians
1909–10 - Hamilton Academical/Wishaw Thistle
1910–11 - Airdrieonians
1911–12 - Motherwell
1912–13 - Airdrieonians
1913–14 - Airdrieonians
1914–15 - Airdrieonians
1915–16 - Wishaw Thistle
1916–17 - Wishaw Thistle
1917–18 - Airdrieonians
1918–19 - Airdrieonians
1919–20 - Hamilton Academical
1920–21 - Albion Rovers
1921–22 - Airdrieonians
1922–23 - Airdrieonians
1923–24 - Hamilton Academical
1924–25 - Airdrieonians
1925–26 -
1926–27 - Motherwell
1927–28 - Motherwell
1928–29 - Motherwell
1929–30 - Motherwell
1930–31 - Airdrieonians
1931–32 - Motherwell
1932–33 -
1933–34 - Hamilton Academical
1934–35 - Airdrieonians
1935–36 -
1936–37 -
1937–38 - Airdrieonians
1938–39 - Hamilton Academical
1939–40 - Motherwell

1848–49 - Albion Rovers
1949–50 - Motherwell
1950–51 - Albion Rovers
1951–52 - Hamilton Academical
1952–53 - Motherwell
1953–54 - Motherwell
1954–55 - Motherwell
1955–56 -
1956–57 - Motherwell
1957–58 - Motherwell
1958–59 - Motherwell
1959–60 - Motherwell
1960–61 - Motherwell
1961–62 - Motherwell
1962–63 - Airdrieonians
1963–64 - Motherwell
1964–65 -
1965–66 - Airdrieonians
1966–67 - Airdrieonians
1967–68 - Motherwell
1968–69 - Motherwell
1969–70 - Airdrieonians
1970–71 - Airdrieonians
1971–72 -
1972–73 - Motherwell
1973–74 - Albion Rovers
1974–75 - Albion Rovers
1975–76 - Airdrieonians
1976–77 - Motherwell
1977–78 -
1978–79 -
1979–80 - Airdrieonians
1980–81 - Motherwell
1981–82 - Albion Rovers
1982–83 - Motherwell
1983–84 - Airdrieonians
1984–85 - Motherwell
1985–86 - Hamilton Academical
1986–87 - Albion Rovers
1987–88 - Airdrieonians
1988–89 - Motherwell
1989–90 - Motherwell
1990–91 - Motherwell
1991–92 - Motherwell/Hamilton Academical
1992–93 - Airdrieonians
1993–94 -
1994–95 -
1995–96 - Airdrieonians
