= 1894–95 Scottish Cup preliminary rounds =

Tournament details
- Country: Scotland
- Teams: 130

Tournament statistics
- Matches played: 114
- Goals scored: 669 (5.87 per match)

The preliminary rounds for the 1894–95 Scottish Cup took place between 1 September and 17 November 1894 to decide the 16 teams that would join the 16 exempt clubs in the first round.

A total of 130 teams entered the preliminary rounds which were open to all members of the Scottish FA.

After the completion of the four preliminary rounds which saw 669 goals scored across 114 matches, Airdrieonians, Annbank, Ayr Parkhouse, Forfar Athletic, Galston, Kilmarnock, King's Park, Lochee United, Motherwell, Mossend Swifts, Orion, Polton Vale, Raith Rovers, Slamannan Rovers, Stevenston Thistle and 5th Kirkcudbright RV advanced to the first round.

Following the introduction of the Scottish Qualifying Cup in 1895–96, this would be the last season to feature preliminary rounds for 118 years.

== Format ==
Alongside the four semi-finalists from the previous season, 12 further teams were voted to be exempt from competing in the preliminary rounds. The names of the remaining clubs were placed into lots according to their districts and drawn into pairs. The home team would be the first team drawn unless only one of the clubs in a pair had a private ground. In the event of a draw, the second team drawn would have the choice of ground for the replay. This process was repeated for the second and third preliminary rounds. All competing clubs were placed into a single lot for the fourth preliminary round.

=== Calendar ===
1894–95 Scottish Cup preliminary rounds calendar
Round	Date	Ties			Clubs
Round	Date	Original	Byes	Replays	Clubs
First preliminary round	1 September 1894	62	6	9	130 → 68
Second preliminary round	22 September 1894	32	4	4	68 → 36
Third preliminary round	13 October 1894	16	4	1	36 → 20
Fourth preliminary round	3 November 1894	4	12	1	20 → 16

=== Teams ===
At a committee meeting on 29 May 1894, the 16 teams to be exempt from the preliminary rounds were decided. By virtue of being semi-finalists in 1893–94, Celtic, Queen's Park, Rangers and 3rd Lanark RV were the first to be exempt. Following a vote, Heart of Midlothian, Dumbarton, Dundee, St Bernard's, St Mirren, Hibernian, Leith Athletic, Clyde, Renton, East Stirlingshire, Battlefield and Abercorn were given an exemption from the preliminary rounds.

Competing teams arranged by district
Dunbartonshire, Stirlingshire and Clackmannanshire		East of Scotland, Fife and Border Counties		Glasgow and Lanarkshire		Renfrewshire, Ayrshire and Argyll	
Alloa Athletic; Alva; Camelon; Clackmannan; Clydebank; Dalmuir Thistle; Dunipace; Duntocher Harp; Falkirk; Gairdoch; Grangemouth	Grasshoppers; Kilsyth Hibernians; Kilsyth Wanderers; King's Park; Laurieston; Newtown Thistle; Slamannan; Slamannan Rovers; Stenhousemuir; Vale of Leven	Adventurers; Bathgate; Black Watch; Bo'ness; Bonnyrigg Rose Athletic; Broxburn Shamrock; Cowdenbeath; Edinburgh Casuals; Edinburgh University; Kelso; Kirkcaldy	Linlithgow Athletic; Loch Rangers; Lochgelly United; Mossend Swifts; Penicuik Athletic; Polton Vale; Raith Rovers; Selkirk; Townhill; Uphall	Airdriehill; Airdrieonians; Albion Rovers; Burnbank Swifts; Cambuslang; Carfin; Cowlairs; Dykehead; Gaelic; Glasgow Wanderers; Glengowan	Gordon Highlanders; Hamilton Academical; Hamilton Harp; Linthouse; Motherwell; Northern; Partick Thistle; Royal Albert; Wishaw Thistle; 4th VB Scottish Rifles	Annbank; Arthurlie; Ayr; Ayr Parkhouse; Beith; Bridge of Weir; Bute Rangers; Cartvale; Cathcart Volunteers; Cronberry Eglinton; Dalry; Dykebar; Galston; Girvan Athletic; Hurlford; Inveraray; Irvine; Johnstone	Kilbarchan; Kilbirnie; Kilmarnock; Kilmarnock Athletic; Kilwinning Eglinton; Lanemark; Lochwinnoch; Monkcastle; Morton; Neilston; Paisley Academicals; Paisley Celtic; Pollokshaws; Port Glasgow Athletic; Saltcoats Victoria; Stevenston Thistle; Thornliebank

Competing teams arranged by district
Aberdeenshire	Forfarshire	Northern Counties	Perthshire	Southern Counties
Aberdeen; Orion; Peterhead; Victoria United	Arbroath; Arbroath Wanderers; Brechin; Dundee Wanderers; Forfar Athletic; Kirriemuir; Lochee United; Montrose; West End	Clachnacuddin; Inverness Caledonian; Inverness Thistle; Inverness Union	Dunblane; Duncrub Park; Fair City Athletic; Rob Roy; St Johnstone; Vale of Atholl; Vale of Ruthven	Annan; Barholm Rovers; Garliestown; Mid-Annandale; Newton Stewart Athletic; St Cuthbert Wanderers; 5th Kirkcudbright RV; 6th Galloway RV

== First preliminary round ==
=== Glasgow and Lanarkshire district ===
Hamilton Harp received a bye to the second preliminary round.

Glasgow and Lanarkshire district first preliminary round results
Date	Home team	Score	Away team	Venue
1 September 1894	Cowlairs	4–4	Dykehead	Gourlay Park, Glasgow
1 September 1894	Airdriehill	3–2	Gaelic	New Monkland, Airdrie
1 September 1894	Albion Rovers	3–5	Carfin	Meadow Park, Coatbridge
1 September 1894	4th VB Scottish Rifles	0–6	Airdrieonians	Maxwell Park, Glasgow
1 September 1894	Partick Thistle	6–1	Royal Albert	Inchview, Partick
1 September 1894	Glengowan	1–3	Wishaw Thistle	Dumbreck Park, Caldercruix
1 September 1894	Cambuslang	3–5	Linthouse	Whitefield Park, Cambuslang
1 September 1894	Northern	3–3	Gordon Highlanders	Hyde Park, Glasgow
1 September 1894	Burnbank Swifts	5–3 (protested) (Note: A protest from Hamilton Academical was upheld and a replay was ordered.)	Hamilton Academical	Victoria Park, Hamilton
	Motherwell	w/o (Note: Glasgow Wanderers scratched and Motherwell advanced to the second preliminary round.)	Glasgow Wanderers	

Glasgow and Lanarkshire district first preliminary round replays
Date	Home team	Score	Away team	Venue
8 September 1894	Dykehead	1–1	Cowlairs	Dykehead Park, Shotts
8 September 1894	Northern	4–1	Gordon Highlanders	Hyde Park, Glasgow
22 September 1894	Hamilton Academical	1–4	Burnbank Swifts	Douglas Park, Hamilton

Glasgow and Lanarkshire district first preliminary round second replay
Date	Home team	Score	Away team	Venue
15 September 1894	Cowlairs	1–2	Dykehead	Airdrie (Note: Match played at a neutral venue.)

=== Renfrewshire, Ayrshire and Argyll district ===
Kilbarchan received a bye to the second preliminary round.

Renfrewshire, Ayrshire and Argyll district first preliminary round results
Date	Home team	Score	Away team	Venue
1 September 1894	Monkcastle	4–1	Neilston	Claremont Park, Kilwinning
1 September 1894	Kilwinning Eglinton	5–6	Paisley Celtic	Blacklands Park, Kilwinning
1 September 1894	Ayr Parkhouse	3–2	Ayr	Beresford Park, Ayr
1 September 1894	Cartvale	3–1	Lochwinnoch	Cartsbridge Park, Busby
1 September 1894	Cronberry Eglinton	4–6	Paisley Academicals	Derrens Holm, Cronberry
1 September 1894	Arthurlie	0–2	Kilmarnock Athletic	Dunterlie Park, Barrhead
1 September 1894	Irvine	1–7	Annbank	Cochrane Park, Irvine
1 September 1894	Kilbirnie	2–3	Lanemark	Milton Park, Kilbirnie
1 September 1894	Beith	1–4	Port Glasgow Athletic	Muir Field, Beith
1 September 1894	Morton	9–0	Saltcoats Victoria	Cappielow, Greenock
1 September 1894	Dalry	1–4	Stevenston Thistle	Townend Park, Dalry
	Girvan Athletic	w/o (Note: Bridge of Weir scratched and Girvan Athletic advanced to the second preliminary round.)	Bridge of Weir	
	Pollokshaws	w/o (Note: Pollokshaws scratched and Kilmarnock advanced to the second preliminary round.)	Kilmarnock	
	Hurlford	w/o (Note: Cathcart Volunteers scratched and Hurlford advanced to the second preliminary round.)	Cathcart Volunteers	
	Thornliebank	w/o (Note: Inveraray scratched and Thornliebank advanced to the second preliminary round.)	Inveraray	
	Galston	w/o (Note: Bute Rangers scratched and Galston advanced to the second preliminary round.)	Bute Rangers	
	Dykebar	w/o (Note: Dykebar scratched and Johnstone advanced to the second preliminary round.)	Johnstone	

=== East of Scotland, Fife and Border Counties ===
Edinburgh University received a bye to the second preliminary round.

East of Scotland, Fife and Border Counties first preliminary round results
Date	Home team	Score	Away team	Venue
1 September 1894	Selkirk	1–8	Raith Rovers	Linglie Park, Selkirk
1 September 1894	Kirkcaldy	3–3	Polton Vale	Newton Park, Kirkcaldy
1 September 1894	Kelso	0–5	Uphall	Springwood Park, Kelso
1 September 1894	Bonnyrigg Rose Athletic	1–4	Bo'ness	Eskbank, Bonnyrigg
1 September 1894	Lochgelly United	1–3	Mossend Swifts	School's Park, Lochgelly
1 September 1894	Penicuik Athletic	4–2	Casuals	Royal Hotel Park, Penicuik
1 September 1894	Adventurers	2–2	Black Watch	Easter Road, Edinburgh
1 September 1894	Broxburn Shamrock	11–1	Loch Rangers	Shamrock Park, Broxburn
1 September 1894	Linlithgow Athletic	4–1	Bathgate	Captain's Park, Linlithgow
1 September 1894	Townhill	2–4	Cowdenbeath	Cairncubie Park, Townhill

East of Scotland, Fife and Border Counties first preliminary round replays
Date	Home team	Score	Away team	Venue
8 September 1894	Polton Vale	5–2	Kirkcaldy	Vale Park, Loanhead
8 September 1894	Black Watch	2–5	Adventurers	Edinburgh

=== Dunbartonshire, Stirlingshire and Clackmannanshire district ===
Gairdoch received a bye to the second preliminary round.

Dunbartonshire, Stirlingshire and Clackmannanshire district first preliminary round results
Date	Home team	Score	Away team	Venue
1 September 1894	Dalmuir Thistle	0–3	Alloa Athletic	Castle Park, Dalmuir
1 September 1894	Dunipace	5–3	Vale of Leven	George's Park, Denny
1 September 1894	Slamannan Rovers	4–4	Grasshoppers	Glebe Park, Slamannan
1 September 1894	King's Park	7–2	Newton Thistle	Forthbank Park, Stirling
1 September 1894	Laurieston	3–2	Alva	Zetland Park, Laurieston
1 September 1894	Stenhousemuir	7–1	Slamannan	Ochilview Park, Stenhousemuir
1 September 1894	Falkirk	7–0	Kilsyth Hibernian	Brockville Park, Falkirk
1 September 1894	Duntocher Harp	2–4	Clackmannan	Fore Park, Duntocher
	Camelon	w/o (Note: Clydebank scratched and Camelon advanced to the second preliminary round.)	Clydebank	
	Kilsyth Wanderers	w/o (Note: Grangemouth scratched and Kilsyth Wanderers advanced to the second preliminary round.)	Grangemouth	

Dunbartonshire, Stirlingshire and Clackmannanshire first preliminary round replay
Date	Home team	Score	Away team	Venue
8 September 1894	Grasshoppers	0–7 (protested) (Note: A protest by Grasshoppers was upheld and a replay was ordered.)	Slamannan Rovers	Longcroft Park, Bonnybridge

Dunbartonshire, Stirlingshire and Clackmannanshire first preliminary round second replay
Date	Home team	Score	Away team	Venue
	Slamannan Rovers	w/o (Note: Grasshoppers scratched and Slamannan Rovers advanced to the second preliminary round.)	Grasshoppers	

=== Forfarshire district ===
Brechin received a bye to the second preliminary round.

Forfarshire district first preliminary round results
Date	Home team	Score	Away team	Venue
1 September 1894	Kirriemuir	0–7	Lochee United	Newton Park, Kirriemuir
1 September 1894	Dundee Wanderers	11–0	Arbroath Wanderers	East Dock Street, Dundee
1 September 1894	Arbroath	2–1	Montrose	Gayfield Park, Arbroath
	Forfar Athletic	w/o (Note: West End scratched and Forfar Athletic advanced to the second preliminary round.)	West End	

=== Aberdeenshire district ===
Aberdeenshire district first preliminary round results
Date	Home team	Score	Away team	Venue
1 September 1894	Aberdeen	3–3	Orion	Chanonry Grounds, Aberdeen
1 September 1894	Victoria United	8–1	Peterhead	Recreation Grounds, Aberdeen

Aberdeenshire district first preliminary round replay
Date	Home team	Score	Away team	Venue
8 September 1894	Orion	5–1	Aberdeen	Central Park, Aberdeen

=== Northern Counties ===
Northern Counties first preliminary round results
Date	Home team	Score	Away team	Venue
1 September 1894	Inverness Caledonian	2–0	Clachnacuddin	Caledonian Park, Inverness
1 September 1894	Inverness Thistle	3–1	Inverness Union	Thistle Park, Inverness

=== Perthshire district ===
Vale of Ruthven received a bye to the second preliminary round.

Perthshire district first preliminary round results
Date	Home team	Score	Away team	Venue
1 September 1894	Duncrub Park	3–5	Fair City Athletic	Duncrub Park, Dunning
1 September 1894	St Johnstone	1–3	Rob Roy	Recreation Grounds, Perth
1 September 1894	Vale of Atholl	4–3	Dunblane	Recreation Grounds, Pitlochry

=== Southern Counties ===
Southern Counties first preliminary round results
Date	Home team	Score	Away team	Venue
1 September 1894	Annan	2–4	5th Kirkcudbright RV	Cricket Field, Annan
1 September 1894	Barholm Rovers	3–5	Newton Stewart Athletic	Barholm Park, Creetown
	Mid-Annandale	w/o (Note: Garlieston scratched and Mid-Annandale advanced to the second preliminary round.)	Garlieston	
	St Cuthbert Wanderers	w/o (Note: 6th Galloway RV scratched and St Cuthbert Wanderers advanced to the second preliminary round.)	6th Galloway RV	

== Second preliminary round ==
=== Glasgow, Lanarkshire, Ayrshire and Renfrewshire district ===
Cartvale received a bye to the third preliminary round.

Glasgow, Lanarkshire, Ayrshire and Renfrewshire district second preliminary round results
Date	Home team	Score	Away team	Venue
22 September 1894	Kilbarchan	3–7	Ayr Parkhouse	Mountview Park, Kilbarchan
22 September 1894	Hamilton Harp	0–0	Northern	West End Park, Hamilton
22 September 1894	Linthouse	2–1	Burnbank Swifts	Langlands Park, Govan
22 September 1894	Airdriehill	1–3	Motherwell	New Monkland, Airdrie
22 September 1894	Galston	5–3	Wishaw Thistle	Riverside Park, Galston
22 September 1894	Stevenston Thistle	4–0	Monkcastle	Warner Park, Stevenston
22 September 1894	Annbank	3–0	Partick Thistle	Pebble Park, Annbank
22 September 1894	Paisley Celtic	3–4	Paisley Academicals	Celtic Park, Paisley
22 September 1894	Port Glasgow Athletic	6–0	Hurlford	Clune Park, Port Glasgow
22 September 1894	Lanemark	2–1	Kilmarnock Athletic	Connell Park, New Cumnock
22 September 1894	Thornliebank	4–2	Johnstone	Deacon's Bank Park, Thornliebank
22 September 1894	Carfin	4–4	Kilmarnock	Byres Knowe Park, Carfin
22 September 1894	Dykehead	4–2	Morton	Dykehead Park, Shotts
	Girvan Athletic	w/o (Note: Girvan Athletic scratched and Airdrieonians advanced to the third preliminary round.)	Airdrieonians	

Glasgow, Lanarkshire, Ayrshire and Renfrewshire district second preliminary round replays
Date	Home team	Score	Away team	Venue
29 September 1894	Northern	4–1	Hamilton Harp	Hyde Park, Glasgow
29 September 1894	Kilmarnock	4–2	Carfin	Rugby Park, Kilmarnock

=== East of Scotland, Fife, Dunbartonshire, Stirlingshire and Clackmannanshire district ===
King's Park and Edinburgh University received a bye to the third preliminary round.

East of Scotland, Fife, Dunbartonshire, Stirlingshire and Clackmannanshire district second preliminary round results
Date	Home team	Score	Away team	Venue
22 September 1894	Falkirk	4–0	Gairdoch	Brockville Park, Falkirk
22 September 1894	Slamannan Rovers	3–1	Stenhousemuir	Glebe Park, Slamannan
22 September 1894	Polton Vale	4–1	Penicuik Athletic	Vale Park, Loanhead
22 September 1894	Mossend Swifts	2–0 (protested) (Note: A protest by Kilsyth Wanderers was upheld and a replay was ordered.)	Kilsyth Wanderers	Mossend Park, West Calder
22 September 1894	Alloa Athletic	6–7	Adventurers	Bellvue Park, Alloa
22 September 1894	Linlithgow Athletic	2–5	Bo'ness	Captain's Park, Linlithgow
22 September 1894	Camelon	3–1	Broxburn Shamrock	Victoria Park, Camelon
22 September 1894	Cowdenbeath	5–0	Dunipace	North End Park, Cowdenbeath
22 September 1894	Uphall	2–4	Raith Rovers	Crossgreen Park, Uphall
	Clackmannan	w/o (Note: Laurieston scratched and Clackmannan advanced to the third preliminary round.)	Laurieston	

East of Scotland, Fife, Dunbartonshire, Stirlingshire and Clackmannanshire district second preliminary round replay
Date	Home team	Score	Away team	Venue
5 October 1894	Mossend Swifts	5–0	Kilsyth Wanderers	Mossend Park, West Calder

=== Forfarshire and Perthshire district ===
Dundee Wanderers received a bye to the third preliminary round.

Forfarshire and Perthshire district second preliminary round results
Date	Home team	Score	Away team	Venue
22 September 1894	Vale of Ruthven	0–5	Lochee United	School Park, Auchterarder
22 September 1894	Forfar Athletic	4–1	Brechin	Station Park, Forfar
22 September 1894	Vale of Atholl	4–1	Arbroath	Recreation Grounds, Pitlochry
22 September 1894	Fair City Athletic	4–1	Rob Roy	Balhousie Park, Perth

=== Aberdeenshire district ===
Aberdeenshire district second preliminary round result
Date	Home team	Score	Away team	Venue
22 September 1894	Victoria United	4–4	Orion	Recreation Grounds, Aberdeen

Aberdeenshire district second preliminary round replay
Date	Home team	Score	Away team	Venue
29 September 1894	Orion	5–0	Victoria United	Central Park, Aberdeen

=== Northern Counties ===
Northern Counties second preliminary round result
Date	Home team	Score	Away team	Venue
22 September 1894	Inverness Thistle	1–0	Inverness Caledonian	Thistle Park, Inverness

=== Southern Counties ===
Southern Counties second preliminary round results
Date	Home team	Score	Away team	Venue
22 September 1894	St Cuthbert Wanderers	2–1	Mid-Annandale	St Mary's Park, Kirkcudbright
22 September 1894	5th Kirkcudbright RV	12–2	Newton Stewart Athletic	Palmerston Park, Dumfries

== Third preliminary round ==
=== Glasgow, Lanarkshire, Ayrshire and Renfrewshire district ===
Northern received a bye to the fourth preliminary round.

Glasgow, Lanarkshire, Ayrshire and Renfrewshire district third preliminary round results
Date	Home team	Score	Away team	Venue
13 October 1894	Cartvale	2–3	Annbank	Cartsbridge Park, Busby
13 October 1894	Thornliebank	2–4	Stevenston Thistle	Deacon's Bank Park, Thornliebank
13 October 1894	Galston	4–0	Port Glasgow Athletic	Riverside Park, Galston
13 October 1894	Airdrieonians	4–2	Linthouse	Broomfield Park, Airdrie
13 October 1894	Dykehead	1–3	Kilmarnock	Dykehead Park, Shotts
13 October 1894	Paisley Academicals	3–7	Motherwell	Greenlaw Park, Paisley
13 October 1894	Lanemark	2–5	Ayr Parkhouse	Connell Park, New Cumnock

=== East of Scotland, Fife, Dunbartonshire, Stirlingshire and Clackmannanshire district ===
Bo'ness and Edinburgh University received a bye to the fourth preliminary round.

East of Scotland, Fife, Dunbartonshire, Stirlingshire and Clackmannanshire district third preliminary round results
Date	Home team	Score	Away team	Venue
13 October 1894	King's Park	3–2	Camelon	Forthbank Park, Stirling
13 October 1894	Slamannan Rovers	5–1	Adventurers	Glebe Park, Slamannan
13 October 1894	Polton Vale	8–2	Falkirk	Vale Park, Loanhead
13 October 1894	Clackmannan	1–3	Mossend Swifts	Mossend Park, West Calder
13 October 1894	Cowdenbeath	3–3	Raith Rovers	North End Park, Cowdenbeath

East of Scotland, Fife, Dunbartonshire, Stirlingshire and Clackmannanshire district third preliminary round replay
Date	Home team	Score	Away team	Venue
27 October 1894	Raith Rovers	2–1	Cowdenbeath	Stark's Park, Kirkcaldy

=== Forfarshire and Perthshire district ===
Fair City Athletic received a bye to the fourth preliminary round.

Forfarshire and Perthshire district third preliminary round results
Date	Home team	Score	Away team	Venue
13 October 1894	Forfar Athletic	5–3	Dundee Wanderers	Station Park, Forfar
13 October 1894	Lochee United	2–0	Vale of Atholl	South Park Road, Dundee

=== Aberdeenshire and Northern Counties ===
Aberdeenshire and Northern Counties third preliminary round results
Date	Home team	Score	Away team	Venue
13 October 1894	Orion	3–1	Inverness Thistle	Central Park, Aberdeen

=== Southern Counties ===
Southern Counties third preliminary round results
Date	Home team	Score	Away team	Venue
13 October 1894	5th Kirkcudbright RV	3–0	St Cuthbert Wanderers	Palmerston Park, Dumfries

== Fourth preliminary round ==
Annbank, Galston, Kilmarnock, Lochee United, Mossend Swifts, Motherwell, Orion, Polton Vale, Raith Rovers, Slamannan Rovers, Stevenston Thistle and 5th Kirkcudbright RV received a bye to the first round.

Fourth preliminary round results
Date	Home team	Score	Away team	Venue
3 November 1894	Bo'ness	2–2	Ayr Parkhouse	Newtown Park, Bo'ness
3 November 1894	Fair City Athletic	1–3	Airdrieonians	Balhousie Park, Perth
3 November 1894	King's Park	9–1	Edinburgh University	Forthbank Park, Stirling
3 November 1894	Forfar Athletic	4–0	Northern	Station Park, Forfar

Fourth preliminary round replay
Date	Home team	Score	Away team	Venue
17 November 1894	Ayr Parkhouse	6–1	Bo'ness	Beresford Park, Ayr

== Aftermath ==
The competition's format was altered at the Scottish FA annual general meeting on 7 May 1895. A proposal to replace the preliminary rounds with a qualifying cup competition was supported by 28 votes to 23 and the Scottish Qualifying Cup was established. As a result, this would be the last season until 2012–13 which would feature preliminary rounds.
