= 1890–91 Kilmarnock F.C. season =

Kilmarnock
1890–91 season
- Stadium: Rugby Park
- Scottish Cup: First round
- Ayrshire Cup: Winners
Home colours

Season 1890–91 was the 18th season of competitive football by Kilmarnock.

== Overview ==
Kilmarnock entered the Scottish Cup for the 18th time and also competed in the Ayrshire Cup. They were eliminated in the first round of the Scottish Cup in a replay by Annbank for the second consecutive season despite scoring six times in the two matches.

Killie fared better in the Ayrshire Cup. After defeating Irvine, 5–0, in the first round, they recorded a club-record 15–0 win against Lanemark in the second round, a record which still stands after 134 years. They overcame Kilbirnie 3–1 in a third round replay to reach the semi-finals where they defeated local rivals Kilmarnock Athletic, 3–2. In the final, Kilmarnock set another record as they defeated Hurlford 7–1 – the largest margin of victory in an Ayrshire Cup final.

After three seasons playing in black and white stripes, Kilmarnock changed their uniforms back to the original Oxford blue. The team would play the next five seasons decked all in blue.

== Scottish Cup ==
Date	Round	Opponents	H / A	Result F–A	Scorers	Attendance
6 September 1890	First round	Annbank	H	4–4		4,000
13 September 1890	First round replay	Annbank	A	2–6		

== Ayrshire Cup ==
Date	Round	Opponents	H / A	Result F–A	Scorers	Attendance
1 November 1890	First round	Irvine	H	5–0		
22 November 1890	Second round	Lanemark	A	15–0		
13 December 1890	Third round	Kilbirnie	H	1–1		
17 January 1891	Third round replay	Kilbirnie	A	3–1		
7 February 1891	Semi-final	Kilmarnock Athletic	A	3–2		
21 February 1891	Final	Hurlford	N	7–1		
