= Monkcastle F.C. =

Association football club in Scotland

Monkcastle
- Full name: Monkcastle Football Club
- Nickname(s): the Monks
- Founded: 1883
- Dissolved: 1900
- Ground: Claremont Park
- Secretary: James S. Morgan, J. Andrews
| Original colours | Final colours |

Monkcastle Football Club was a football club which existed from 1883 to 1900, in the town of Kilwinning, Ayrshire, Scotland.

== History ==
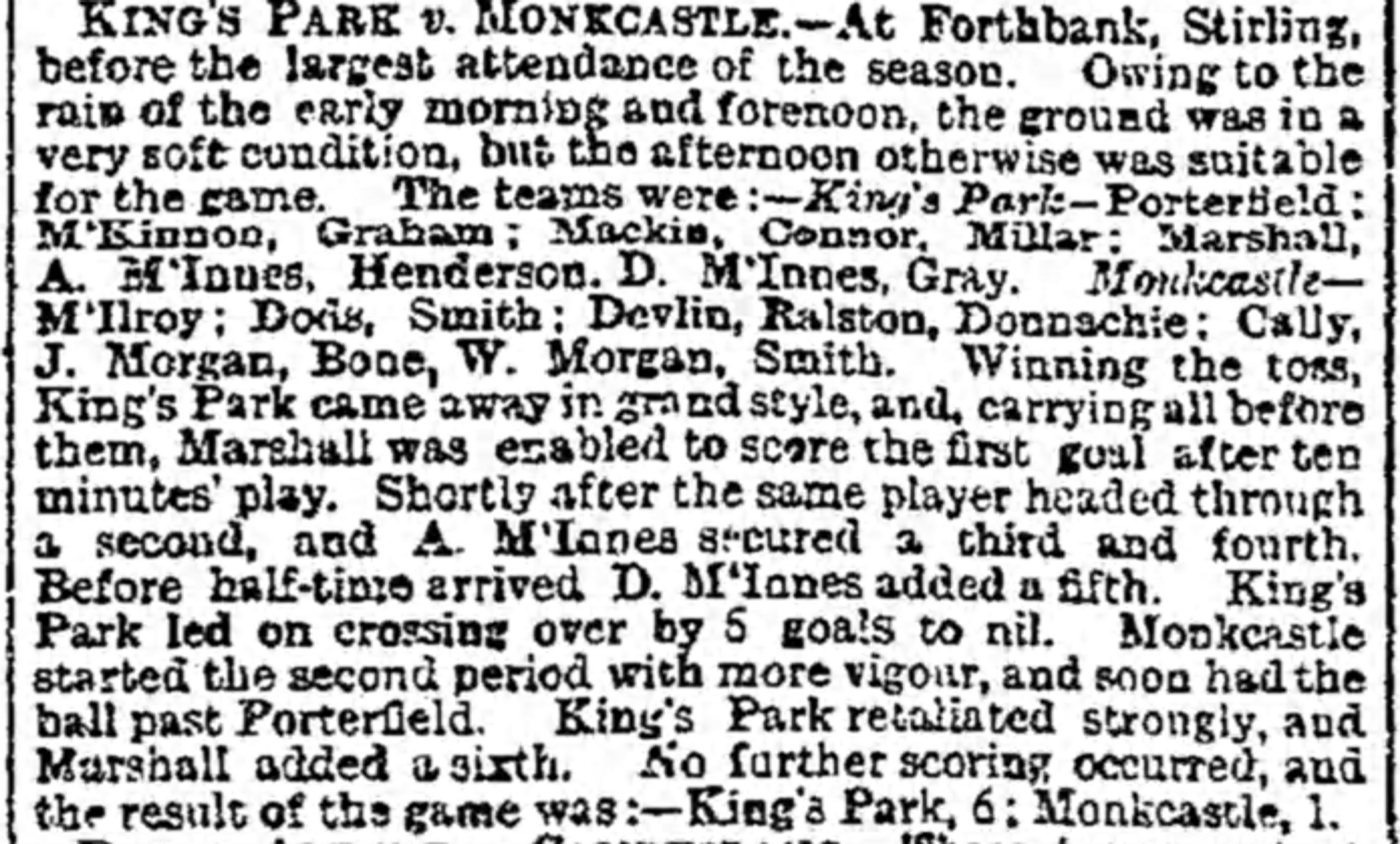
The club's last first round tie: a 6–1 defeat to King's Park in 1892–93, Glasgow Herald, 28 November 1892

The club was formed in 1883 and was named after a district in Kilwinning which contained an old abbey. It was founded by employees of Howie's Iron Foundry in Kilwinning and occasionally referred to as Kilwinning Monkcastle. The Monks joined the Ayrshire Association soon after foundation and played in the Ayrshire Cup for the first time in 1883–84, losing in the second round.

=== National competitions ===
In 1885, the club joined the Scottish Football Association, and entered the 1885–86 Scottish Cup. In the first round, the club lost 3–0 at Lanemark in a match spoilt by a high wind, but Monkcastle protested on the basis that Lanemark had not registered one D. Brown in time. The Scottish FA ordered a replay at Claremont, which the Monks won 2–0, thanks to second half goals from the Morgan brothers. In the second round, Ayr went 4–0 up at Claremont before the Monks scored two late consolations due to their "fine passing". Lanemark gained a revenge in the 1886–87 Scottish Cup with an undisputed first round win.

The club did not play at a senior level from 1887 to 1890, only entering local competitions; it scratched from its 1887–88 Scottish Cup first round tie and was thrown off the senior roll for non-payment of subscriptions in August 1888. However the club was re-admitted in 1890 and on its return to senior football had its best Scottish Cup run in its first season back. Wins at Port Glasgow Athletic and Dalry meant the club made the third round for the only time in its history - Dalry's protest about Monkcastle not hosting the match at its registered ground was unanimously dismissed. At that stage it lost heavily at home to Burnbank Swifts, despite taking the lead.

In 1891–92 the Scottish Football Association introduced qualifying rounds, with the bigger clubs exempted until the first round proper. Monkcastle won its way through to that stage in both 1891–92 and 1892–93, losing in the first round both times; the club's most notable victim in the preliminary rounds was Morton in the third round in 1891, whom the club unexpectedly beat 4–2, scoring four in the first half, the first of J. Morgan's two goals being described as "a beauty". The club continued to enter the Cup, and then the Scottish Qualifying Cup after its introduction in 1895, but did not play in the first round proper again.

=== Local competitions ===
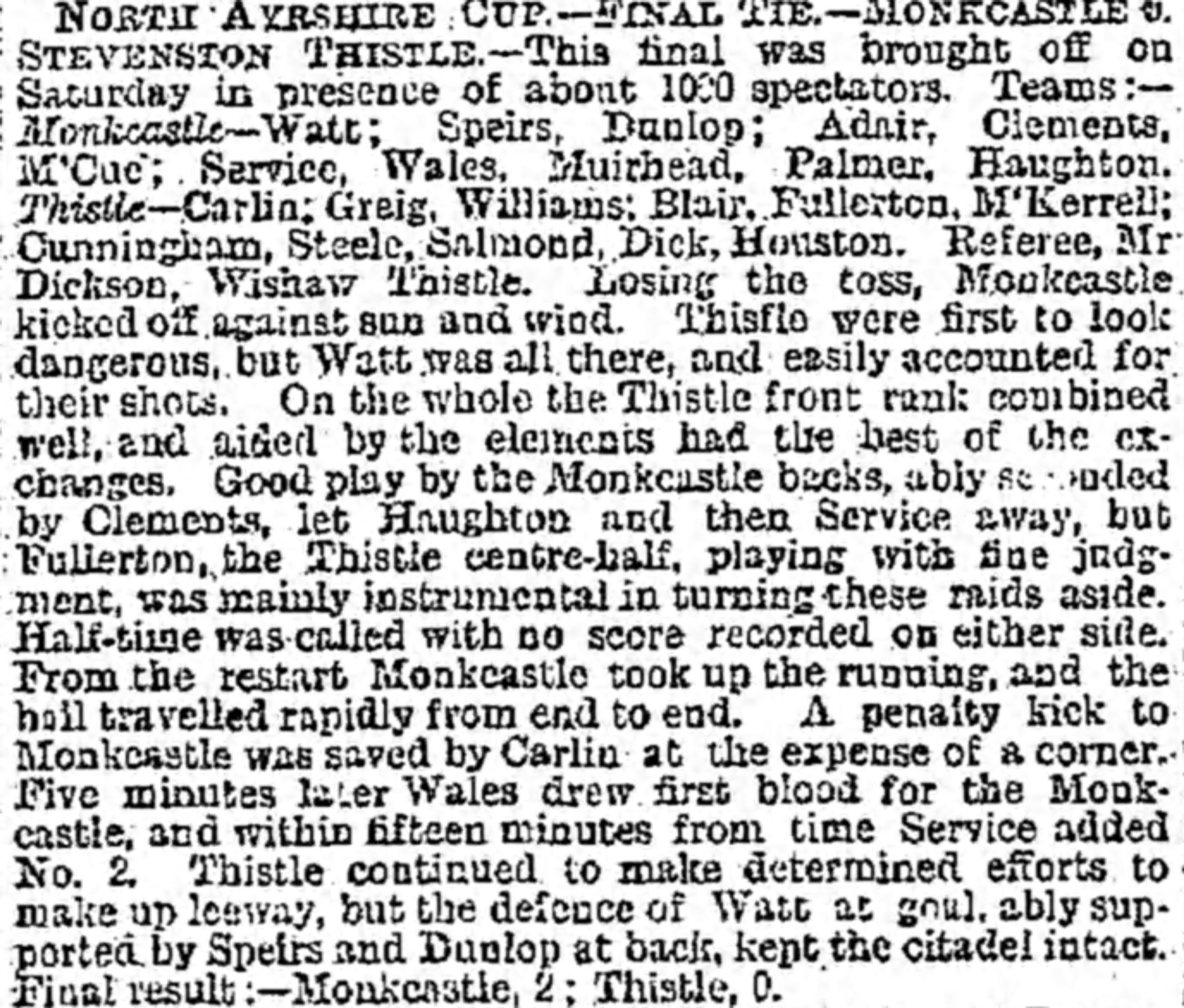
The club's finest achievement: winning the North Ayrshire Cup, Glasgow Herald, 17 May 1897

Monkcastle struggled because of the strength of football in Ayrshire. In the Ayrshire Cup, the club did not get past the second round until 1891–92. That season, it reached the quarter-final, and beat Stevenston Thistle ostensibly to reach the semi-final, but a protest overturned the result and Thistle won the replay. It was the only time the club reached that stage.

The rise of the Scottish League and alternative competitions was also a blow to the club, especially after the larger sides Kilmarnock and Ayr were recruited to membership, further reducing opportunities to play lucrative friendlies or Cup ties. The Ayrshire League was set up in 1891 to help in this regard, and the Monks played in its first three seasons, but struggled, and finished dead last in 1893–94. The club then took the decision to join the Ayrshire Combination, which was ostensibly for the stronger clubs in the county, and in its first season (1894–95) the Monks registered 1 point in 16 games. Paradoxically, this launched the club's most successful seasons. In 1895–96, Monkcastle rose to second in the table, ahead of future League club Ayr Parkhouse, and in 1896–97 it won the North Ayrshire Cup, played for the first time on a group plus final basis. The Monks had come out top of the table ahead of Steventon Thistle, and beat the Thistle in the title play-off.

The Ayrshire Combination only lasted one more season and Monkcastle did not come close to winning the North Ayrshire again. It disbanded in 1900, because of mounting debts, and the loss of the club president, who had defected to Kilwinning Eglinton. The last record of the club on the national stage was its being drawn at home to Galston in the Qualifying Cup in 1900–01. The same season the club drew a bye in the first round of the county cup, but withdraw rather than face Eglinton in the second.

== Colours ==
The club's colours were originally ¾" black and white hooped jerseys and dark shorts.

In 1890 the club changed to blue and white vertical stripes and in 1893 the club changed again to black and gold.

== Grounds ==
The club played at Claremont Park, off Union Road.

== Honours ==
- North Ayrshire Cup
  - Winners: 1896–97
  - Runners-up: 1894–95
- Ayrshire Combination
  - Runners-up: 1895–96

== Notable players ==
- James Allan, capped for Scotland in 1886–87 John Allan of Monkcastle F.C. finished second in the Scottish 880 yard championship of 1888.
