= Dalry F.C. =

Former association football club in Scotland

Dalry
- Full name: Dalry Football Club
- Founded: 1884
- Dissolved: 1897
- Ground: Blairland Park
- Secretary: Daniel Clelland
Home colours

Dalry Football Club was an association football club from Dalry, Ayrshire, Scotland.

== History ==
The club was formed in 1884 with 40 members. In its first season, the club had an equable season, winning 14 and losing 13 of its 34 matches, and coming out with an even goal difference, scoring and conceding 77 goals; by that time the club's membership had risen to 71, which made it one of the biggest Ayrshire clubs outside Kilmarnock and Ayr.

However, as a comparative latecomer, Dalry was never a successful club. It entered the Scottish Cup every season from 1884–85 to 1896–97, and only once got as far as the third round proper; after the Scottish Football Association introduced preliminary rounds in 1891–92, and later the Scottish Qualifying Cup, Dalry did not win through to the first round proper. Indeed, Dalry only won two preliminary ties, both in 1891–92.

The club's best run in the competition was in its second entry in 1885–86. The club's first round tie was at Ayr Rovers, for whom the tie was its first competitive match, and it arranged the kick-off for after the conclusion of the Ayr v Maybole match taking place on the same day. Although that attracted a larger crowd than expected, it was no help to the Rovers, as Dalry won 8–0. In the second round, Dalry beat Lugar Boswell 6–2 at home, all of the goals being scored in the same goal, with Dalry going in at half-time 6–0 to the good. Dalry lost 6–1 at home to Ayr in the third round.

That the club had been swiftly overtaken by other clubs was shown by its losing to Lugar Boswell in the Cup in the next two seasons. In 1886–87 the clubs' second round tie had to be replayed owing to the intoxication of the referee, who could not even remember the match score (3–2 to Lugar Boswell) when the SFA called him as a witness. Lugar Boswell won the replayed tie 6–1 and beat Dalry 9–0 the following season.

Dalry's record in the county competition (the Ayrshire Cup) was of a similar stamp. It entered over the same period as the Scottish Cup (except for 1895–96) and only won 5 ties. Its best run was in 1893–94, when wins over Irvine and Lanemark put Dalry in the quarter-finals, where it lost to Saltcoats Victoria in a replay.

Dalry however had an unexpected success in the Ayrshire Football League. This had been founded in 1891 and Dalry joined before the 1893–94 season. By this time many of the leading clubs had left for alternative leagues, but in 1894–95 Dalry won the title, with 14 points from 10 games; the club's final match was at home to Galston, two points behind, and level on points with Beith, which had completed its fixtures. Needing a point for the title, Dalry stormed home 8–2. However the League wound up at the end of the season, and, without a league for 1895–96, Dalry almost went out of business, scratching from its Scottish Cup tie and not entering the Ayrshire. The club did reform for 1896–97 but it seems to have been one of the 19 struck from the roll in August 1897.

== Colours ==
The club originally wore blue and black hooped shirts and hose, with white knickers. In 1892 the club changed to red and black vertical stripes with black knickers.

== Ground ==
The club's original ground at Bleezepark, to the west of the town, ¾ of a mile from Dalry railway station. In 1886 the club moved to Blairland Park, 200 yards from the station. In 1892, with the change of colours, Dalry also changed grounds, moving to Townend Park.
