= Newmilns F.C. =

Association football club in Scotland

Newmilns
- Full name: Newmilns Football Club
- Nickname(s): the Lacemakers
- Founded: 1887
- Dissolved: 1895
- Ground: West End Park
- Match Secretary: Allan Jackson, R. Y. Cunningham
- Hon. Secretary: James F. Shields
Home colours

Newmilns Football Club was a football club from the village of Newmilns, Ayrshire, Scotland.

== History ==
The club was originally the footballing branch of the 2nd Ayrshire Rifle Volunteers, a company in the Volunteer movement of the British Army, and played under the 2nd A.R.V. name. The club was admitted as member of the Scottish Football Association in 1887 and entered both the Scottish Cup and the Ayrshire Cup for the first time in 1887–88. The club lost in the first round of the Cup in both 1887–88 and 1888–89 to Maybole, both times in replays, the Maybole side being rewarded for the second win with a case of brandy.

In 1889 the club changed its name to Newmilns, possibly to widen its constituency, and seemingly also absorbing two other clubs from the village (Newmilns Rangers and Newmilns Star) which vanish from the records afterwards. The move paid immediate dividends in the national competition, as the club won a tie for the first time in the 1889–90 competition, coming from behind to win 4–1 at Mauchline in a "rather rough game", but losing in the second round 5–0 at Kilbirnie.

The club's biggest competitive Cup win came in the first round of the 1890–91 Scottish Cup, with a 13–0 win away at Greenock Abstainers; however the club lost in a second round replay to Uddingston, the half-time period being enlivened by spectators chasing and killing a hare which had darted onto the empty pitch. The results mirrored the club's performance in the Ayrshire Cup, as it never won more than one tie in any season in the local competition either.

The replay defeat was the club's final match in the competition proper. With the rise of league football, the Scottish FA introduced a qualifying stage, and Newmilns did not win through to the first round again. Newmilns did join a league - the Ayrshire Football League - on its foundation in 1891, but only lasted three seasons in it, finishing bottom and bottom-but-one in its latter two. A highlight was a 14–1 win over Irvine in October 1891, which was the second-biggest win in the competition's history; unfortunately for the club, the biggest win was against the club, when it lost 16–2 at Annbank in January 1893. At the end of the 1893–94 season the club ceased playing competitive football, and in April 1895 the club's assets were auctioned off.

The club however had an influence beyond its on-field achievements; the football division of the Örgryte sports club was set up by lacemakers from Newmilns in 1891 and members played in the first football match in Sweden the following year.

== Colours ==
The club's colours were blue and white hooped jerseys and black knickers.

== Grounds ==
The club originally played at Hillhead Park. In 1889 it moved to West End Park.

== Notable players ==
- Hughie Wilson, who earned an international cap for Scotland while with the club, and who went on to win the title in both England and Scotland
