= Kilmarnock Athletic F.C. (1888) =

Association football club in Kilmarnock, Scotland

Kilmarnock Athletic
- Full name: Kilmarnock Athletic Football Club
- Nickname(s): the Athletic, the Red Shirts, the Quarryites
- Founded: 1888
- Dissolved: 1900
- Ground: Holm Quarry
Home colours

Kilmarnock Athletic Football Club was an association football club from Ayrshire in Scotland.

== History ==
The club was founded in 1888, under the name Rosebank, sometimes named in the media as Kilmarnock Rosebank. The club played one Scottish Cup tie under that name, losing to Stewarton Cunninghame F.C. in the first round in 1888, the match marking the club's "first bow to a football crowd of any size"; Rosebank was under the disadvantage of having to switch the tie to Stewarton as Holm Quarry had already been booked for a cricket match. The club's protest that the Stewarton ground had a tree and hedge growing on the touch line was literally laughed out of a Scottish Football Association meeting.

=== Name change and Scottish Cup entries ===
The club changed its name in December 1888 to Kilmarnock Athletic, losing 3–2 to its Cup conquerors Stewarton in the first match under the new name. The name change was possibly in response to a newspaper report that supporters of the original Kilmarnock Athletic F.C. were still loyal to the "red jackets" and a call for a new side to replace the lost Athletics, especially given that the club changed its shirt colours to those of the former club.

The new Athletic club was not as successful as the former club, playing the Scottish Cup from 1889–90 until 1898–99, only twice winning ties in the main competition rounds. The second occasion (in 1891–92) saw the team through to a second round tie against Celtic, which the Bhoys won 3–0.

After the Scottish Qualifying Cup was introduced, the club only won through to the first round once, in 1897–98, where it had the distinction of twice being beaten by Ayr Parkhouse in consecutive Cup ties. The clubs met in the third round of the Qualifying Cup at Holm Quarry, Parkhouse winning 2–1, and, as all teams reaching that stage were put into the first round of the competition proper, the luck of the draw paired them up again. This time the Parkies hosted the match at Beresford Park, and came out on top a second time; Athletic held the lead with 15 minutes remaining but conceded a winner in the 86th minute.

=== League football ===
In common with many Scottish clubs, after the formation of the Scottish League, the Red Shirts sought league competition. It was one of the five clubs which instigated the Scottish Football Federation, the third such competition in Scotland (after the League and the Scottish Football Alliance) in 1891–92, but finished near the bottom of the table of the competition's first season, and the club, struggling with the increased travel expenses for a national competition, withdrew at the end of the season.

The club then played in local leagues, finishing second in the Ayrshire Football League in 1892–93 and third in the Ayrshire Football Combination in 1894–95, but the more local competitions fell into disarray and despite various attempts at reform or reinvigoration, did not last, and the club was without senior league football for its final years.

=== Ayrshire Cup ===
The club did however have some success in the Ayrshire Cup, reaching the semi-finals on three occasions, and winning the tournament outright in 1896–97 by beating Kilmarnock F.C. in a replay at Somerset Park before a crowd of 3,000; the Athletic took the lead very early on and was 3–0 ahead by half-time, with goals from Logan, Edgar, and Young, and the Athletic "carried themselves safely" in the second half without any further goals. The competition that season was played with the early rounds having two legs, and club appeared to have been knocked out in the first round by Irvine after losing the away leg, but the game was re-played after the local association ruled pitch invasions had made the match impossible.

=== End of the club ===
The cup win was a last hurrah for the club, as the Scottish League was proving too powerful an attraction for clubs outside it, especially after Ayr F.C. and Kilmarnock were admitted as members. The club's final entry to the Scottish Cup was in 1899–1900, but the club scratched before the first qualifying round at Stevenston Thistle. The club was struck from the Scottish Football Association register in April 1900.

== Colours ==
The club's colours as Rosebank were a "smart blue and white uniform" of white shirts with navy shorts. After changing to Kilmarnock Athletic, the club wore maroon shirts, with white shorts for 1890–91 and black shorts thereafter, although the jerseys were described more than once as being red.

== Ground ==
The club's ground was Holm Quarry, previously used by other clubs from the town. The stand at the ground was destroyed by heavy winds in 1895, which was a devastating financial blow for the club.

== Notable players ==
- John Brodie, who played for the club in the late 1890s
- Michael McAvoy and Robert Maxwell, both of whom left the Athletic for Darwen F.C. in late 1891
