= Ayrshire Football League =

- Founded: 1891
- Abolished: 1911
- Region: Scotland
- Most successful club(s): Kilmarnock (3 titles)

The Ayrshire Football League is a defunct soccer league in Scotland.

== Original competition ==
The League was formed in time for the 1891–92 season, by ten clubs which were members of both the Scottish Football Association and the Ayrshire Football Association. The annual fee for playing in the competition was £1, although two clubs would be selected at each season's end to play a friendly match, the crowd proceeds being added to the League's fund. The bottom three in each year had to apply for re-election, and a play-off would decide the title if clubs were level on points at the top of the table; gate money was shared, with visiting clubs guaranteed £2 10s.

By 1893 the Ayrshire Football League had increased to 16 clubs. With the players still mostly amateur, the volume of fixtures was proving too much, and 7 clubs left the League to form the Ayrshire Football Combination, one of the sides leaving being the double champion Annbank.

As a result, the League lost most of its lustre. With the Ayrshire Cup being played on a 2 leg basis, the competition was cut down to 6 clubs in 1894–95, with the visiting guarantee rule scrapped, but one of the clubs leaving - to join the Combination, which was growing from 6 to 8 - was the champion Saltcoats Victoria. The last champion of the original incarnation was Dalry, which had only finished 7th from 9 the previous season. Dalry's final match, on 18 May 1895, was at home to Galston, with Dalry needing a point to win the title, and Galston needing a win to force a three-way play-off; Beith had completed its fixtures but started the day at the top of the table. Dalry however stormed to the title with an 8–2 win.

== Intermittent revivals ==
An Ayrshire League was played between the three leading senior sides in the county (Kilmarnock, Ayr, and Ayr Parkhouse) in 1896–97, won by Kilmarnock.

In December 1900, four clubs (Galston, Beith, Ayr Parkhouse, and Maybole), tried another revival, but Galston withdrew before playing, and the league was never finished; the last played match, a Maybole win over Beith in a game of "the roughest description", left both sides on 4 points, with Parkhouse pointless. The following season, the same four clubs were joined by Stevenston Thistle, but again not all fixtures were played. Maybole claimed the title thanks in part to an agreement with Beith that the game between the two clubs counted as two fixtures, so 4 points were on offer for the winner, and Maybole romped home 6–0.

The final attempt at an Ayrshire League was proposed in February 1909 from the county's members of the Scottish Football League, and was decided by a play-off between the top two clubs in the table. The first two finals saw Kilmarnock beat Ayr, but in the final competition, the newly-created Ayr United - despite being 2 points behind Kilmarnock in the 3-team table - beat Kilmarnock 1–0 at Somerset Park, albeit aided by Kilmarnock's centre-forward Cunningham breaking his collarbone after half-an-hour.

== Champions ==
- 1891–92 Annbank
- 1892–93 Annbank
- 1893–94 Saltcoats Victoria
- 1894–95 Dalry
- 1896–97 Kilmarnock
- 1900–01 unfinished
- 1901–02 Maybole
- 1908–09 Kilmarnock
- 1909–10 Kilmarnock
- 1910–11 Ayr United

== Membership ==
- Annbank 1891–93
- Ayr 1896–97, 1908–10
- Ayr Parkhouse 1891–93, 1896–97, 1900–02, 1908–10
- Ayr United 1910–11
- Beith 1891–95, 1900–02
- Dalry 1893–95
- Galston 1891–95, 1900–02, 1908–11
- Hurlford 1892–93
- Irvine 1891–95
- Kilbirnie 1892–93, 1894–95
- Kilmarnock 1896–97, 1908–11
- Kilmarnock Athletic 1892–94
- Kilwinning Eglinton 1893–95
- Kilwinning Monkcastle 1891–94
- Mauchline 1891–92
- Maybole 1900–02
- Newmilns 1891–94
- Saltcoats Victoria 1891–94
- Stevenston Thistle 1891–93, 1901–02

== See also ==
- Scottish Football (Defunct Leagues)
