= Maybole F.C. (1895) =

Association football club in Scotland

Maybole
- Full name: Maybole Football Club
- Nickname(s): the Shoemakers, the Snobs
- Founded: 1895
- Dissolved: 1921
- Ground: Ladywell Park
Home colours

Maybole Football Club was a football club which existed from 1896 to 1922, from the town of Maybole, Ayrshire, Scotland.

== History ==
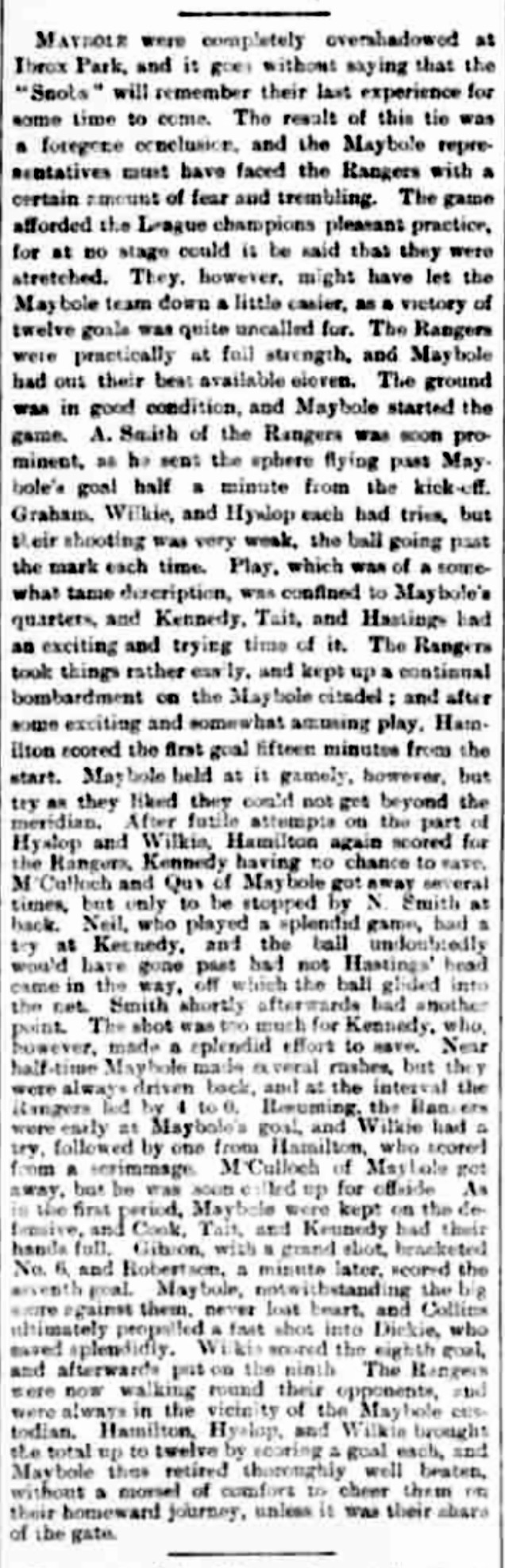
1899–1900 Scottish Cup 2nd Round, Rangers 12–0 Maybole, Ardrossan and Saltcoats Herald, 2 February 1900

The club was formed in 1895, four years after the demise of the previous senior club in the town. The club entered the Ayrshire Cup in 1895 and beat Lugar Boswell in a twice-played tie in the first round, losing to Galston in the second.

The club's first entry into a national competition was in the Scottish Qualifying Cup for 1896–97. Drawn at home to Ayr F.C., the new club took a surprise lead after ten minutes; Ayr equalized ten minutes later and scored five more without reply.

Maybole only won through the Qualifying Cup into the main rounds of the Scottish Cup once, in 1899–1900. Maybole played just one match to reach the required stage, winning one tie by default and gaining another bye. The club's qualifying run ended in the fifth round against Galston; Maybole protested against Galston's use of metal shinpads but the protest was dismissed as having been made out of time.

In the first round proper, the club hosted Wishaw, and went behind early on; Maybole equalized with a goal that was "glaringly offside", and the game ended 4–2 to the home side, the final goal also being dubious.

Maybole's reward was a second round tie at Ibrox Park against Rangers. The club conceded 4 in the first half and 8 in the second, but at least had the consolation of sharing in a gate of £65.

The 1900–01 season saw the club reach the Ayrshire Consolation Cup Final; the club's best run in the competition proper was to the semi-final in 1909–10. Maybole did win the Ayrshire Football League in 1901–02, albeit the League was a low-key competition, and the club's penultimate match, at home to Beith counted as both the home and away fixture for both sides, making it worth 4 points for a win - Maybole's 6–0 triumph over a Cabes side missing its four best forwards put the Snobs joint top with Galston, which had already played its fixtures, and a win over Ayr Parkhouse secured the title.

The club briefly had rivalry in the town; in 1905 a new club, Vale of Carrick, was founded, but the Maybole players stayed loyal to the club, forcing the Vale to recruit from Glasgow. The Vale lasted only half a season, Maybole beating Vale 7–1 in a league fixture at Ladywell Park. In 1906–07, the club joined the Scottish Football Combination for clubs in the south-west of Scotland, but was a perennial struggler, never finishing the season above last or last-but-one.

The club's last Scottish Cup tie came in the 1914–15 season; the club scratched from successive entries in 1919–20 and 1920–21, so was barred from entering for 1921–22. The last record of a club activity is an Ayrshire Cup fixture with Ayr United in 1921.

== Colours ==
The club's colours were as follows:

- 1896–97: chocolate & white vertical stripes
- 1897–99: maroon shirt, black shorts
- 1899–1901: red
- 1901–22: maroon shirts, white shorts

== Grounds ==
The club originally played at Gardenrose Park. In 1898, it moved to Ladywell Park, raising funds for a pavilion via a national subscription.
