= 1892–93 in Scottish football =

Football in Scotland
- Season: 1892–93

1892–93 in Scottish football

Scottish Football League champions
- Celtic

Scottish Cup winners
- Queen's Park

Junior Cup winners
- Vale of Clyde

Scotland national team
- 1893 BHC

1892–93 in Scottish football was the 20th season of competitive football in Scotland and the third season of the Scottish Football League.

== League competitions ==
=== Scottish Football League ===
Celtic became Scottish Football League champions for the first time.

Pos	Team	Pld	W	D	L	GF	GA	GD	Pts	Qualification or relegation
1	Celtic (C)	18	14	1	3	54	25	+29	29	Champions
2	Rangers	18	12	4	2	41	27	+14	28	
3	St Mirren	18	9	2	7	40	39	+1	20	
4	Third Lanark	18	9	1	8	53	39	+14	19	
5	Heart of Midlothian	18	8	2	8	39	41	−2	18	
6	Dumbarton	18	8	1	9	35	35	0	17	
6	Leith Athletic	18	8	1	9	35	31	+4	17	
8	Renton	18	5	5	8	31	44	−13	15	Re-elected
9	Abercorn (R)	18	5	1	12	35	52	−17	11	Not re-elected. Joined the 1893–94 Scottish Division Two
10	Clyde (R)	18	2	2	14	25	55	−30	6	Not re-elected. Joined the 1893–94 Scottish Division Two

Source: statto.com
Rules for classification: Teams finish equal if level on points. Points system: 2 points for a win, 1 point for a draw, 0 points for a loss
(C) Champions; (R) Relegated

== Other honours ==
=== Cup honours ===
==== National ====
Competition	Winner	Score	Runner-up
Scottish Cup	Queen's Park	2 – 1 (Note: Replay ordered. First match null and void.)	Celtic
Scottish Junior Cup	Vale of Clyde	3 – 0 (Note: Replay needed.)	Dumbarton Fern

==== County ====
Competition	Winner	Score	Runner-up
Aberdeenshire Cup	Victoria United	3 – 2	Orion
Ayrshire Cup	Annbank	5 – 2	Kilbirnie
Border Cup	Selkirk	w.o. (Note: Walkover awarded. First two matches were drawn.)	Hawick Rangers
Dumbartonshire Cup	Dumbarton	7 – 1	Levendale
East of Scotland Shield	Hearts	3 – 1	St Bernard's
Fife Cup	Cowdenbeath	2 – 1	Raith Rovers
Forfarshire Cup	Arbroath	1 – 0	Dundee Harp
Glasgow Cup	Rangers	3 – 1	Celtic
North of Scotland Cup	Inverness Thistle	5 – 2	Forres Mechanics
Lanarkshire Cup	Wishaw Thistle	4 – 1	Royal Albert
Linlithgowshire Cup	Broxburn	3 – 2	Bathgate Rovers
Perthshire Cup	St Johnstone	4 – 1	Dunblane
Renfrewshire Cup	Morton	3 – 0	St Mirren
Southern Counties Cup	Queen of the South Wanderers	2 – 1	Newton Stewart Athletic
Stirlingshire Cup	East Stirlingshire	2 – 1	Kilsyth Wanderers

=== Non-league honours ===
==== Senior ====
Division	Winner
Ayrshire League	Annbank
Midland League	King's Park
Northern League	Arbroath
Scottish Alliance	Cowlairs
Scottish Federation	Royal Albert
South of Scotland League	unfinished

== Scotland national team ==
Date	Venue	Opponents	Score (Note: Scotland's score is shown first.)	Competition	Scotland scorer(s)
18 March 1893	Racecourse Ground, Wrexham (A)	Wales	8–0	BHC	John Madden (4), John Barker (3), William Lambie
25 March 1893	Celtic Park, Glasgow (H)	Ireland	6–1	BHC	William Sellar (2), Sandy McMahon, James Kelly, James Hamilton, Own goal
1 April 1893	Richmond Athletic Ground, London (A)	England	2–5	BHC	William Sellar (2)

Key:

- (H) = Home match
- (A) = Away match
- BHC = British Home Championship

Team	Pld	W	D	L	GF	GA	GD	Pts
England (C)	3	3	0	0	17	3	+14	6
Scotland	3	2	0	1	16	6	+10	4
Ireland	3	1	0	2	6	15	−9	2
Wales	3	0	0	3	3	18	−15	0

Rules for classification: 1) points. The points system worked as follows: 2 points for a win and 1 point for a draw.
(C) Champions

== Other national teams ==
=== Scottish League XI ===
Date	Venue	Opponents	Score (Note: Scottish League XI's score is shown first.)	Scotland scorer(s)
8 April	Celtic Park, Glasgow (H)	(England) Football League XI	3–4	John Taylor, John Madden, Sandy McMahon
29 April	Ulsterville Park, Belfast (A)	(Northern Ireland) Irish League XI	2–3	Robert Laing, Andrew Brown

== See also ==
- 1892–93 Rangers F.C. season
