= North Ayrshire Cup =

- Founded: 1893
- Abolished: 1908
- Region: Scotland
- Most successful club(s): Kilwinning Eglinton/Beith/Galston, 3 wins each

The North Ayrshire Cup, also known as the North Ayrshire League or North Ayrshire League Cup. was a league association football tournament for senior teams in the north of Ayrshire, Scotland.

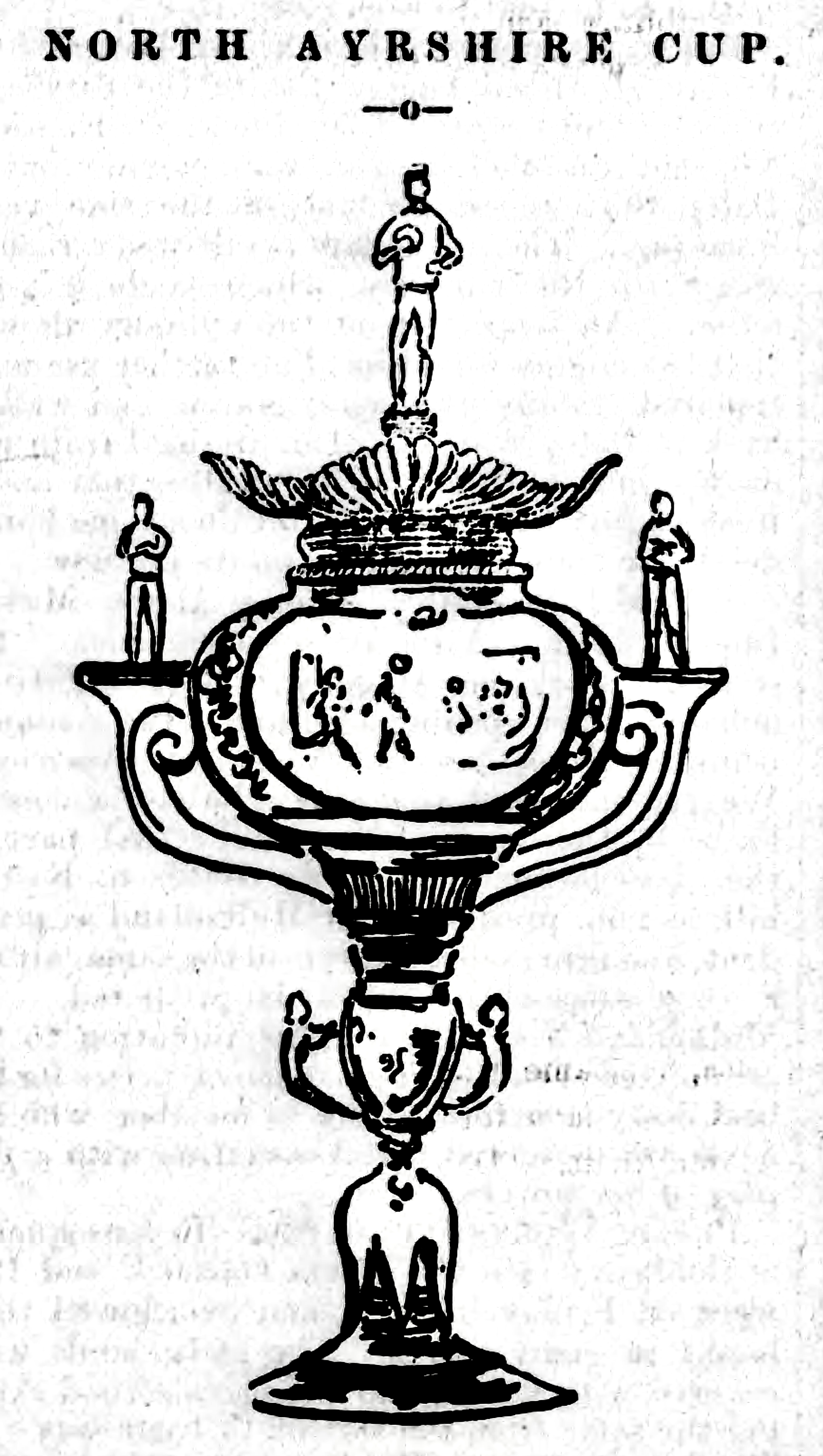
North Ayrshire Cup, Irvine Herald, 22 October 1897

== History ==
The North Ayrshire Football Association was formed at a meeting in Kilwinning in April 1894, to provide competition for senior clubs in the north of the county. The clubs agreed to contribute to a trophy, to be called the North Ayrshire Cup, for the following season. Further funds came from a friendly between Queen's Park and a North Ayrshire select at Stevenston.

The first two seasons were played as a knockout, and from 1895–96 to 1905–06 as a regular league, finishing with a play-off. With the number of clubs diminishing, its last two seasons were played as a two-legged knockout, and the final instalment remained unfinished.

== List of champions ==
- 1893–94: Saltcoats Victoria
- 1894–95: Stevenston Thistle
- 1895–96: Stevenston Thistle (2)
- 1896–97: Monkcastle
- 1897–98: Kilwinning Eglinton
- 1898–99: Galston
- 1899–00: Kilwinning Eglinton (2)
- 1900–01: Beith
- 1901–02: Kilwinning Eglinton (3)
- 1902–03: Galston (2)
- 1903–04: Beith (2)
- 1904–05: Beith (3)
- 1905–06: Hurlford
- 1906–07: Galston (3)
- 1907–08: unfinished

== See also ==
- Scottish Football (Defunct Leagues)
