= Ayrshire Football Combination =

Football league in Scotland

The Ayrshire Football Combination was formed in 1893 as a breakaway from the Ayrshire Football League. Its original membership was Annbank F.C., Ayr F.C., Ayr Parkhouse F.C., Hurlford F.C., Kilbirnie, Kilmarnock F.C. and Stevenston Thistle F.C.

In 1897 Ayr F.C. joined the Scottish Football League and this sounded the death knell of the Combination.

Champions

- 1893–94 Annbank
- 1894–95 Ayr
- 1895–96 Ayr
- 1896–97 Ayr

Membership

- Annbank 1893–1895
- Ayr 1893–1897
- Ayr Parkhouse 1893–1897
- Beith1895–1897
- Galston 1896–1897
- Hurlford 1893–1897
- Irvine 1895–1897
- Kilbirnie 1893–18894
- Kilmarnock 1893–1895
- Kilmarnock Athletic 1894–1896
- Kilwinning Monkcastle 1894–1897
- Salcoats Victoria 1894–1895
- Stevenson Thistle 1893–1897

== See also ==
- Scottish Football (Defunct Leagues)
