= James Cairns (forward) =

Scottish footballer (active 1898)

Personal information
- Position: Inside right

Senior career*
Years	Team	Apps	(Gls)
1895–?	Stevenston Thistle		
?–1897	Glossop North End		
1897–1898	Lincoln City	0	(0)
1898	Newton Heath	1	(0)
1898–?	Berry's Association	?	(?)
- * Club domestic league appearances and goals

James Cairns was a Scottish footballer who played at inside right for several English clubs, including Lincoln City and Newton Heath in the late 1890s.

Cairns was born in Ardrossan, Scotland. He began his football career with Stevenston Thistle in 1895, before moving to Glossop North End. In September 1897, he joined Football League side Lincoln City, but before he made an appearance for the club, he had moved on to Newton Heath in April 1898. It took Cairns six months to make his debut for the Heathens, eventually playing at inside right in a 2–1 home win over Burslem Port Vale on 8 October 1898. It would turn out to be his only appearance for Newton Heath, however, and he joined Berry's Association in November 1898 before retiring from football.
