= Frank Watt (footballer) =

Scottish footballer

Francis Watt (16 February 1866 – 29 August 1951) was a Scottish footballer who played primarily for hometown club Kilbirnie, as well as short spells with Queen's Park, Clydesdale Harriers, Third Lanark (he was listed as a player at that club when selected for the Glasgow FA team in 1888) and Rangers, with his status as an amateur allowing him to move fairly freely between clubs.

An outside right, Watt scored three goals in four international appearances for Scotland, all while a Kilbirnie player (he was the only player from the Ayrshire club to be capped).
