= Kilwinning Eglinton F.C. =

Association football club in Scotland

Kilwinning
- Full name: Kilwinning Eglinton Football Club
- Nickname(s): the Furnacemen
- Founded: 1893
- Dissolved: 1936
- Ground: Blacklands Park
Home colours

Kilwinning Eglinton Football Club was a football club which existed before World War 2, from the town of Kilwinning, Ayrshire, Scotland.

== History ==
There is one record of an Eglinton club from Kilwinning dating from 1884, but the first evidence for the Kilwinning Eglinton club is from 1893. The club's secretary worked at the Eglinton Iron Works and the ground was built by the ironworks owner William Baird & Company.

The Furnacemen scratched from its first Ayrshire Cup entry in 1893–94, and finished 6th out of 9 in the short-lived Ayrshire League in the same season. The club also lost to Galston F.C. in the first preliminary round of the Scottish Cup.

The club enjoyed some local success, winning the North Ayrshire Cup in 1897–98 and 1899–1900. In 1900–01, the club won the Ayrshire Consolation Cup (for clubs eliminated from the Ayrshire Cup before the final), and also reached the first round proper of the Scottish Cup for the first time. The club beat Ayr Parkhouse F.C. en route to the fourth round of the Qualifying Cup; in the main draw the club lost 10–0 at St Mirren.

In 1901–02, the club scored a remarkable triple; retaining the Consolation Cup and winning the North Ayrshire Cup, and enjoying its best Scottish Cup run, by reaching the fifth round of the Qualifying Cup. The club beat Ayr F.C. 3–1 in the first round of the Qualifying and lost 1–0 at Maxwelltown Volunteers F.C. in the fifth. In the Cup itself, the club ran Arbroath close, taking the lead after ten minutes before conceding a penalty, and only losing 3–2.

The last time the club made the first round proper was in 1903–04, again via reaching the fourth round of the Qualifying Cup. In the first round of the Cup the club lost 2–1 at Albion Rovers, after selling the right to home advantage.

The club entered the Ayrshire and Renfrewshire Football League in the 1903–04 and 1904–05 seasons, but did not take part in the first season, and the second season was abandoned as incomplete.

In the 1907–08 season, the club became a Junior club, and moved to the Irvine & District League; the club's loss of senior status meant it had to abandon its entries to the Scottish and Ayrshire Cups for 1908–09. The last records of the club playing date from May 1936.

== Colours ==
The club's colours were as follows:

- 1893–95: blue
- 1895–97: black and yellow stripes
- 1897 Aug-Nov: maroon
- 1897 Nov–1901: green and white hoops
- 1901–06: blue and white stripes
- 1906-07: blue
- 1907–36: black & amber

== Grounds ==
The club played at Blacklands Park.

== Nickname ==
The club was nicknamed the Furnacemen, after its proximity to the ironworks in Kilwinning.

== Notable players ==
- Bob Currie, player with Heart of Midlothian and Bury
- Bill Culley, Scottish Cup winner with Kilmarnock
