= Irvine F.C. (1877) =

Association football club in Scotland

Irvine
- Full name: Irvine Football Club
- Nickname: the Chemists
- Founded: 1877
- Dissolved: 1899
- Ground: Cochrane Park
Home colours

Irvine Football Club was a football club from the town of Irvine, Ayrshire, Scotland.

== History ==
The club was formed in 1877, under the name Irvine Academicals, sometimes given as Irvine Academical, and its first recorded matches were played in 1879. The club was originally primarily for the former pupils of the Irvine Royal Academy.

The Academicals played friendly matches for the first few years of its existence, and first entered a competition of note - the Ayrshire Cup - in 1882. Its first tie, against Stevenson Dynamite, was annulled following a protest, and in the replay the Academicals won 5–0. However the Academicals were hammered in the second round 14–2 at Lugar Boswell.

This setback may have put the Academicals off from entering the following season, as the club next entered in 1884–85, losing in the second round to Hurlford; the original tie was ended 12 minutes early, with Hurlford three goals to the good, but Hurlford was even stronger in the replay at Newfield, winning 10–1. The Academicals' first win in the competition came in 1886–87, 7–1 against Springside Athletic, but the club lost 2–0 at Kilbirnie in the second round.

Before the 1887–88 season, the club changed its name from Irvine Academicals to simply Irvine, and in 1888–89 the club entered the Scottish Cup for the first time. Irvine was drawn to play at Beith F.C., and in "miserably wet and cheerless weather" on a "perfect quagmire" of a pitch, Irvine won 3–2. Irvine received a bye into the third round, but lost 4–2 at Hurlford.

In the next two seasons, before the Scottish Football Association introduced a preliminary stage, the club lost to Lugar Boswell (in a replay) and Abercorn in first round ties, both by 8–0.

Irvine was a founder member of the Ayrshire Football League in 1891, although in the four seasons for which the League existed, the club was never above mid-table. On the collapse of the League at the end of the 1894–95 season, the club joined the Ayrshire Football Combination, but that competition only lasted for 2 more seasons, and Irvine finished in the bottom two both times.

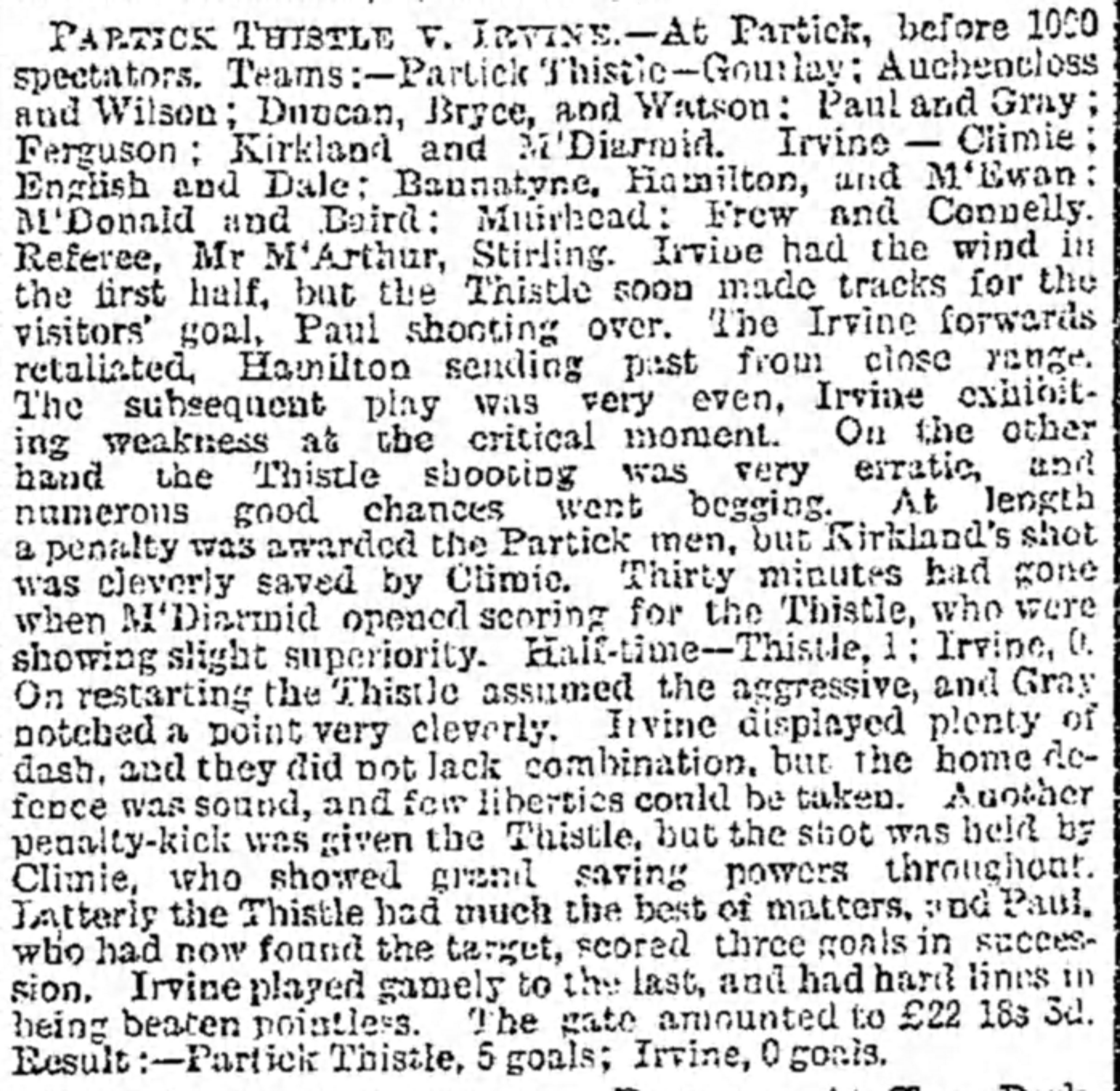
Partick Thistle 5–0 Irvine, Scottish Cup 1st Round, Glasgow Herald, 16 January 1899

The club's best run in the Ayrshire Cup came in 1894–95; Irvine reached the semi-final, but was beaten 10–0 on aggregate by Kilmarnock. The original second leg was abandoned because of rain, when Irvine was 3–0 down, and 6–0 down on aggregate. The club never won another tie in the competition - even when Irvine beat Maybole in the first round in 1897–98, Maybole protested, and won the replay with a double figure score. In 1898–99, the club enjoyed its best run in the Scottish Qualifying Cup, beating Hurlford, Kilmarnock Athletic, and Wigtown, to reach the first round proper of the 1898–99 Scottish Cup. The club was drawn away to Partick Thistle and lost the tie 5–0.

It was the club's last achievement. The club did enter the Scottish and Ayrshire Cups for 1899–1900, but was disbanded before the seasons started; "A long list of debts were read against the club, and money at hand was stated be 6s." The motion to wind up the senior club was put by a member of the Junior club Irvine Meadow XI.

James Green of Irvine F.C. finished second in the Scottish 440 yard championship of 1888.

== Colours ==
The club's colours were navy blue shirts and white shorts.

== Grounds ==
The club originally played on a pitch marked out on the Irvine Mains. By 1881 the club was playing at a ground on the Kilwinning Road known as Newfield.

The club held athletics meetings in 1884 and 1885 at Meadow Park on Quarry Road, and the club moved there for football matches for the 1885–86 season.

In March 1888, the club held a concert in order to raise funds for a pavilion, "which no club in Irvine has hitherto had the advantage of". Before the 1888–89 season started, the club asked permission from the local council to use the publicly-owned Cochrane Park as its ground, and permission was duly granted. In August 1888 the club proposed spending £30 on building a pavilion and repairing the "delapidated" [sic] fence. The ground remained the club's home until its demise.
