= Stevenston Thistle F.C. =

Association football club in Scotland

Stevenston Thistle
- Full name: Stevenston Thistle Football Club
- Nickname(s): the Thistle, the Jags, the Dynamite Boys
- Founded: 1885
- Dissolved: 1904
- Ground: Warner Park
Home colours

Stevenston Thistle Football Club was a football club from the town of Stevenston, Ayrshire, Scotland.

== History ==
The club was founded in 1885. The club's first reported matches are from 1886 and it started to play competitive football from 1887–88, losing in the first round of the Ayrshire Cup and the Scottish Cup.

The club reached the third round of the national competition in 1889–90, where it lost at Abercorn; the score was 2–2 at half-time but three goals in the first five second-half minutes saw the home side through. The following season the club successfully protested a second round defeat by Burnbank Swifts on the basis that the full 90 minutes had not been played, but the club lost the replayed tie anyway.

The club's best performance came after the Scottish Football Association brought in preliminary rounds in 1891, as in reaching the first round proper in 1894–95, the club won 3 ties for the only time, and the last 32 was the furthest the club reached in the competition. The club was drawn to play Clyde at the latter's Barrowfield Park and lost 7–2.

In 1891, the club was a founder member of the Ayrshire Football League; after two seasons of mediocrity, and the league growing to an unfeasible number of clubs, Thistle was one of six clubs which broke away to form the Ayrshire Football Combination, with the North Ayrshire Cup running alongside it as a geographically limited (and therefore cheaper) competition.

The club remained a member of the Combination until its collapse in 1896–97, without success, and finished bottom in its one season back in the Ayrshire League in 1901–02. However, the Thistle won the North Ayrshire Cup in 1894–95 (played as a knockout) and 1895–96 (played as a league, beating Beith 2–1 in a title playoff). The club was also runner-up in 1896–97 and 1898–99 - in the latter season losing a play-off to Galston, after the clubs had finished level on points, by 8 goals to 1. The club also reached the final of the Ayrshire Cup for the only time in 1900–01, and, against the odds, took Ayr to a replay, only going down 2–1 at the second time of asking.

By 1902–03, local leagues were no longer feasible, with Ayrshire clubs in the Scottish League attracting the most attention, and the North Ayrshire League collapsed during the season, with the Thistle having only played four games. The club scratched from its Scottish Qualifying Cup first round tie with Hurlford in 1903–04, having lost the use of Warner Park, and was formally struck off the Scottish FA register before the 1904–05 season.

== Colours ==
The club originally played in maroon shirts with a gold hoop and white knickerbockers. From 1889 to 1894 the club wore blue and white stripes, and after 1894 black and white stripes.

== Grounds ==
The club played at Warner Park, which was later used as the ground for Stevenston United.

== Notable players ==
- James Cairns, who left the club in 1895 to play in the Football League
- Willie Fisher, who joined the club in 1901 having played for several teams in the Football League
- Joseph Frew, who played in the Football League in between two stints with the club
