= Berry's Association F.C. =

Defunct association football team

Berry's Association
- Full name: Berry's Association Football Club
- Nickname: the Blacking Lads
- Founded: 1890
- Dissolved: 1916
- Ground: Blackley Cricket Ground
Home colours

Berry's Association F.C. was a works association football club from Manchester, active before the First World War. The club was almost always referred to as Berry's Association, i.e. Association being part of the club's name, until its final seasons, when it was normally referred to simply as Berry's.

== History ==
The club was founded in 1890 as the works side of the Berry's Blacking Factory and originally played in the Manchester Alliance. It was called W. Berry's Employés until 1897, when it changed name to Berry's Association, and was elected to the Lancashire Combination.

The club enjoyed four mid-table seasons in the Combination, and beat Freetown 4–0 in the final of the Manchester Junior Cup in 1898–99, in front of 2,000 at Manchester City's Hyde Road. However, after the 1900–01 season it did not seek re-election to the Combination and joined the more local Manchester League.

The club reached the Manchester Junior Cup final every season from 1901–02 to 1904–05, losing the first two finals but winning the last two. In 1903–04 the club also won the Manchester League for the only time, two points ahead of Northwich Victoria, although when Mr Wiggins, the League President, presented the trophy to Gilgryst of Berry's, he rather unnecessarily remarked that the club had set no new records, even though its performance had been "grand".

In 1906–07 the club stepped up to the Manchester Senior Cup, unsuccessfully, and amidst a decline, won the Junior Cup again in 1908–09, beating Hazel Grove, to general surprise, 2–0 in a replay; the original game - in which Hazel Grove scored a late penalty to equalize - was at Manchester United and the replay at Manchester City. The club's defence in 1909–10 ended against Ramsbottom in the first round amidst a flurry of penalty controversy. The first match was abandoned, and Ramsbottom won the replayed match 2–1, but Berry's protested, as, when Berry's took a penalty, a Ramsbottom defender stood behind the goal-line (the referee waving away protests_, the penalty was saved, and the defender cleared it; the referee admitted getting the laws of the game wrong, and the replay turned on penalties for each side - Ramsbottom scored, Berry's missed. Berry's had been particularly unfortunate as all ties took place at the Rams' Nuttall Lane ground.

Berry's withdrew from the Manchester League following the 1910–11 season. It joined the South-East Lancashire Combination, winning a league and cup double in 1912–13. The club also lost the 1913–14 Junior Cup final 4–3, to the FA Amateur Cup finalists Northern Nomads, the match held at Hurst. Berry's had a 2–0 lead at half-time but the Nomads scored three times in the first seven minutes of the second half, and Berry's then had Currie sent off for repeated fouling, and although Presnell scored an equalizer, he was carried off as a result, and, although he returned later, Berry's were effectively down to 9 men when the Nomads scored the winner.

However, the onset of the First World War meant that the club gradually lost its players to service. The club's final match, effectively a title decider at home to Mossley on 11 December 1915 (Mossley having a five point lead over Berry's with three games remaining), was a farce; only 7 players turned up, Berry's claiming that the others had gone to a recruiting office to "attest", and the match was delayed 50 minutes until Berry's selected spectators to make up the numbers. Despite this, the score was 1–1 when the referee blew six minutes early because of darkness, each side reduced to 10 after "a bout of fisticuffs" between Meehan (Berry's) and Beevers (Mossley). By the start of 1916, five of the eight clubs (including Berry's) had announced they would take no further part in the competition, and the league disbanded. Berry's did not re-emerge after the war.

== Colours ==
The club originally wore blue jerseys. By 1902 it wore red and white striped shirts.

== Ground ==
The club played at a ground off Church Street in Harpurhey before moving to the Blackley Cricket Ground on Beverley Street in 1903.

== Honours ==
- Manchester League
  - Winner: 1903–04
- Manchester Junior Cup
  - Winner: 1898–99, 1903–04, 1904–05, 1908–09
  - Runner-up: 1894–95, 1895–96, 1901–02, 1902–03, 1913–14
- South-east Lancashire Combination
  - Winner: 1912–13
- South-east Lancashire Cup
  - Winner: 1912–13

== Notable players ==
- List of notable players
