= Lanemark F.C. =

Former association football club in Scotland

Lanemark
- Full name: Lanemark Football Club
- Nickname(s): the Lannies/Laneys
- Founded: 1877
- Dissolved: 1921
- Ground: Connel Park, South Boag, New Cumnock, Scotland
- League: South of Scotland League; 1892–1893; North Ayrshire Football League; 1899–1901; Ayrshire and Renfrewshire Football League; 1904–1905; Scottish Football Combination; 1907–1911
Home colours

Lanemark Football Club was based in the town of New Cumnock, and was one of a number of football clubs formed in the late nineteenth century in and around the Ayrshire coalfield.

== History ==
The original Lanemark F.C. was founded in 1877, although there is a match recorded for a Lanemark side in August 1875. The club took its name from the Lanemark Coal Company which was formed in 1865 to work coal in the vicinity of Lanemark Farm in New Cumnock. As the coal industry grew so did the demand for workers, so the coal company built small basic houses in terraces known as “rows” in the South Boag area of the town.

After entering the Scottish Cup from 1877–78 to 1881–82, never once getting past the first round, the club lost two key players (John Graham and John Reynolds) to Portland, and the club, for the next three years, scratched from competitions rather than playing. In 1885, the club was re-formed, with the same ground and colours.

The club's best season of note in the Scottish Cup came in 1888–89, a season for which the club had strengthened, bringing in players from Hibernian such as John Reynolds (who had played for the club in the early part of the decade) as captain and Breckenridge, helping the club to a 7–0 win over Stevenston Thistle - the club's biggest Cup win - in the first round. Lanemark reached the fourth round before losing 0–8 at Connel Park to a powerful Renton side in front of a crowd of 1,000. The following season however the club suffered a devastating blow when Reynolds was killed in a mining explosion in October.

In 1892 Lanemark joined the new South of Scotland Football League but the League collapsed in disarray, with very few matches arranged; Lanemark only played once, a 9–1 defeat at 5th K.R.V. The next season the club returned to their normal diet of friendlies and local Cup competitions, of which there were many.

The early years of the twentieth century saw Lanemark competing in the North Ayrshire Football League, then the Ayrshire and Renfrewshire Football League and finally the Scottish Combination. It was as a member of the last that the club had its best run in the Ayrshire Cup, in 1906–07, achieving shock wins over both Kilmarnock and Ayr to reach the final, where it lost to Hurlford.

On 30 August 1919, Lanemark played Queen of the South at Palmerston Park, that the Doonhamers won 4–0, only their third-ever friendly match.

However, the club began to struggle financially and it scratched from the 1920–21 Scottish Cup qualifying rounds. The formal end for the club came with its removal from the club register in August 1921.

A new junior club, New Cumnock United, was formed later that same year, also based at Connel Park, but disbanded in 1928. In 1930 the current Western Super League side Glenafton Athletic was formed and their early years were also spent at Connel Park, before moving to their current ground, Loch Park, in 1960.

== Colours ==
The club originally played in royal blue and white jerseys, white knickers, and blue hose, plus a blue cap. By 1880 it had changed to royal blue jerseys and navy blue knickers. After changing the knickers to white in 1887, the club re-adopted the royal and navy blue combination from 1895.

In honour of the recently deceased John Reynolds, Lanemark wore white jerseys with black armbands in the 1889–90 Scottish Cup tie with Ayr Athletic.

== Ground ==
The club played at Connel Park.

== Players ==
see Category:Lanemark F.C. players
