= Kilmarnock Athletic F.C. =

Association football club in Kilmarnock, Scotland

Kilmarnock Athletic
- Full name: Kilmarnock Athletic Football Club
- Nicknames: the Athletics, the Holm Callans
- Founded: 1877
- Dissolved: 1885
- Ground: Holm Quarry
Home colours

Kilmarnock Athletic Football Club was an association football club from Ayrshire in Scotland.

== History ==
On 5 May 1877, the Kilmarnock Cricket Club hosted a charity match between an Ayrshire select and a Glasgow select, in order to raise funds for a statue in honour of Robert Burns, on its Holm Quarry ground. The match was a success, and, in the aftermath, the K.C.C. took over the Winton club in order to continue hosting football.

For its first season the club was known as the Kilmarnock Cricket and Football Club and its first competitive match was a 4–0 win over Maybole Thistle in the first round of the 1877–78 Scottish Cup, with players such as goalkeeper M'Lelland, plus Whyte, Smith, Cunningham, Goudie, Ferguson, and captain Kennedy having been part of the Winton regular XI. The K.C. & F.C. lost 1–0 to Mauchline in the second round.

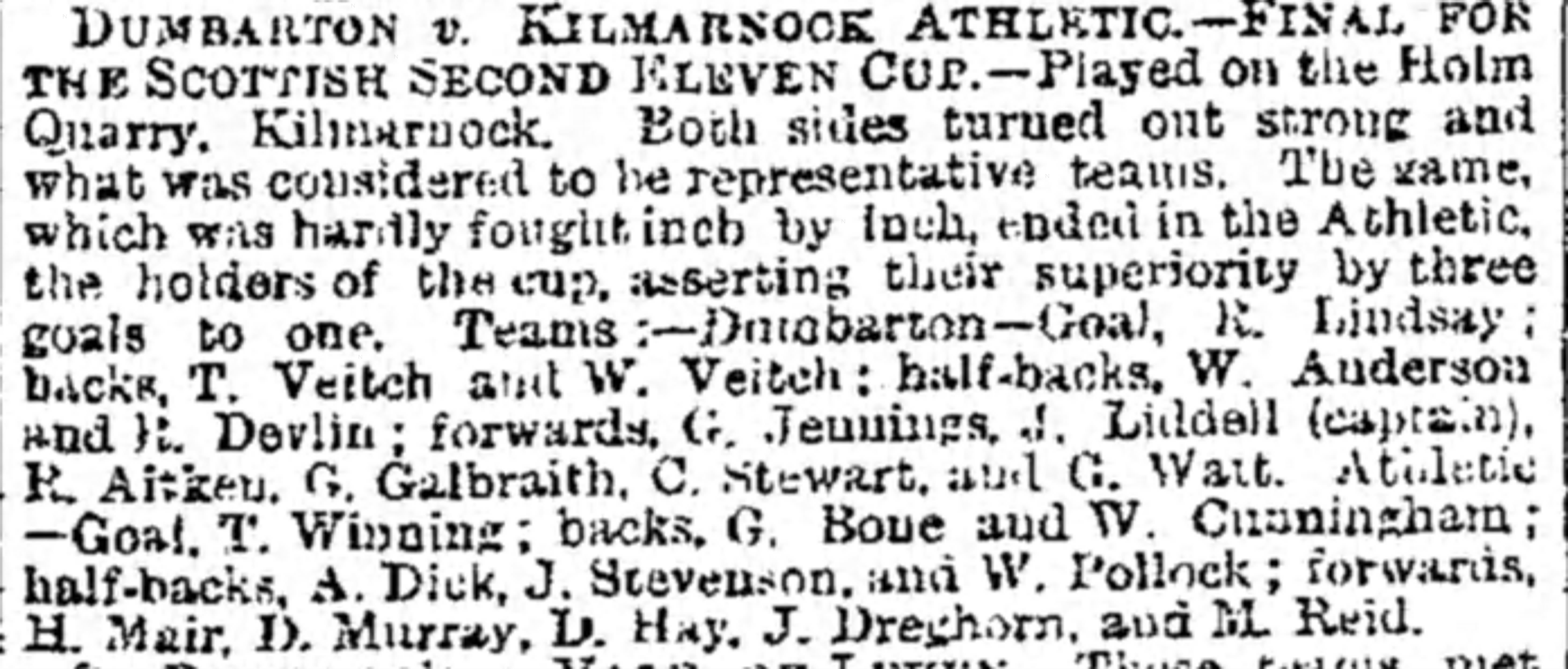
Scottish Second XI Final Replay, Kilmarnock Athletic 3–1 Dumbarton, Glasgow Herald, 31 March 1884

The following season, the club joined the Scottish Football Association under the new name of Kilmarnock Athletic. The club was quickly successful, winning the Ayrshire Cup in 1878–79. From 1881 to 1884 the club was one of the top clubs in Scotland. In 1881–82, the club reached the semi-final of the Scottish Cup, only narrowly losing to Queen's Park.

In 1882–83, the club had an annus mirabilis, winning two of the Ayrshire trophies; the Ayrshire Cup and the Kilmarnock Merchants' Charity Cup, the latter of which was awarded to the club when Hurlford F.C. walked off the pitch in protest at going 2–1 behind in the final. The Athletics also repeated the previous year's feat of reaching the Scottish Cup semi-final. The club was drawn to play Vale of Leven away, and held the Alexandria side to a draw, only to lose 2–0 in the replay at home. The club did however win one national competition; the Second XI Cup, beating Dumbarton 2–0 in the final at Boghead Park, and the Athletic retained the trophy against the same opponent with a 3–1 replay win at Holm Quarry the following season, thanks to goals from Murray, Hay, and Mair, after a 1–1 draw at Boghead.

The club's Cup runs paradoxically caused the club's demise. The club was now an attractive friendly fixture for English clubs, and the Athletics went on tour of England over the following winter. The legalisation of professional football in England meant the players were susceptible to offers of professional contracts south of the border. The club had started the 1884–85 season with its record win, 14–0 over Stewarton Cunninghame F.C. in the Scottish Cup, but the club's leading player, John Goodall, plus two other players (Hay and Walkinshaw), left the club during the winter; the Great Lever club persuaded them not to return home with the Athletic after a friendly in Bolton. The club also lost three other players to Halliwell.

A month after defeat to Ayr in the Merchants' Cup in 1884–85, the club was wound up.

== Later clubs ==
The name Kilmarnock Athletic was used for two clubs in the years afterwards; a junior club formerly known as Kilmarnock Britannia, who used the name in the 1886–87 season, and a senior club originally known as Rosebank, who used the name from 1889 to 1900.

== Colours ==
As the K.C. & F.C., the club wore navy. After changing name to Athletic, the club's colours were crimson shirts (until 1880), scarlet shirts (until 1883), and maroon shirts (until dissolution), with white shorts. In practice the shades of red may have referred to the same colour.

== Ground ==
The club's ground was Holm Quarry, which was briefly shared by Kilmarnock F.C. until the rent forced Killie to find an alternative pitch.

== Notable players ==
- John Goodall, Double winner with Preston North End
- J. Inglis and R. Brown, both earning Scotland caps while with the Athletic
- Alec Dick, later an Everton player
