= Beresford Park =

Stadium in South Ayrshire, Scotland

- Location within South Ayrshire
- Location: Ayr, Scotland
- Coordinates: 55.4570°N 4.6281°W
- Surface: Grass

Construction
- Opened: 1884
- Closed: 1926
- Demolished: 1926

Tenants
- Ayr FC Ayr Parkhouse FC Ayr United FC Reserves: 1884 – 1888; 1888 – 1910; 1910 – 1926

Beresford Park was a former football stadium in town of Ayr in Scotland. The ground was the former home of Scottish Football League teams Ayr FC and Ayr Parkhouse before their merger to form Ayr United FC. The ground was located in the centre of the town, adjacent to Burns statue square, where the current Odeon cinema stands. Parkhouse street and Beresford Terrace now stand on the former site of the stadium named after Ayr Parkhouse FC, former tenants of the ground and the ground itself respectively.

== Ayr FC ==
Ayr FC moved to Beresford Park from Springvale Park in 1884 where they stayed until 1888, when they moved to Somerset Park, current home of Ayr United, taking the grandstand and clubhouse with them. Ayr FC moved from Beresford Park as the Annual Ayr Cattle Show, that was hosted at Beresford Park had been booked earlier than usual, clashing with the clubs clash with the FA Cup holders Aston Villa.

== Ayr Parkhouse FC ==
When Ayr FC moved to Somerset Park, Ayr Parkhouse FC moved from their home at the "Old Racecourse" in the Seafield area of the town. Ayr Parkhouse FC remained at Beresford Park until the merger with Ayr FC in 1910.
