= Kilbirnie F.C. =

Association football club in Scotland

Kilbirnie
- Full name: Kilbirnie Football Club
- Founded: 1874
- Dissolved: 1896
- Ground: Milton Park
Home colours

Kilbirnie Football Club was a football club from the village of Kilbirnie, Ayrshire, Scotland.

== History ==
The club was founded in 1874, although it claimed a foundation date of 1865, probably referring to the foundation date of a cricket club which may have been the genesis of the football club. The earliest reported match for the club is from March 1875.

The club entered the Scottish Cup for the first time in 1875–76, withdrawing rather than playing a second round replay at Mauchline. The club's best run came in its first incarnation came in 1879–80, reaching the fifth round (last 13), having twice taken advantage of the rule permitting both teams to proceed if the original tie and replay both ended in draws; at the fifth round stage, the club lost to the quasi-professional Dumbarton F.C. side. The same season, the club reached the final of the Ayrshire Cup, but lost 1–0 to Beith after the "roughest game ever played".

Kilbirnie seems to have gone into abeyance after the 1882–83 tournament. The club entered the Scottish Cup for 1883–84 but withdrew before playing its tie with Kilmarnock F.C.; that season the club's Stonyholm Park ground was described as "lately" occupied by the club, which also did not take part in the Ayrshire Cup until 1884. When the club reached the Ayrshire Cup final for the first time in 1887, the club was described as "rather brilliant but comparatively new", suggesting a re-foundation, as otherwise the club would have been older than its opponent (Hurlford F.C.). The club lost the final 4–0, thanks to with two goals from William Scobie and two from Johnny M'Knight, but gained revenge over Hurlford in the final the following season, at the same venue, helped by having the majority of the 5,000 crowd behind it, including "a large number of the fair sex"; the match ended 4–3, with Morgans on the left wing scoring one goal, plus his cross resulting in an own goal, to make the half-time score 2–2, and two late goals turning the final around.

The years just before professionalism became legal in Scotland were the best for the club; as well as winning the Ayrshire Cup in 1888, the club also won the Ayrshire Charity Cup in 1889, beating Ayr F.C. in the final, and in 1889–90 reached the last 8 of the Scottish Cup for the only time. Drawn at home to Cup holders Third Lanark RV, the club trained with the athlete Bobbie Hindle to prepare, but to no avail, as the club lost 4–1. It was in these seasons that Frank Watt became the only Kilbirnie player to be capped, playing four times for Scotland, scoring three times.

However the club missed out on league football at a crucial time. Kilbirnie did not join the Ayrshire Football League until its second season in 1892–93. The club finished 5rd out of 11, but for the following season seven of the stronger clubs (including Kilbirnie) founded a new league, the Ayrshire Football Combination. The competition proved too hot for Kilbirnie, which finished last, and re-joined the Ayrshire League for 1894–95. The Combination season had proved disastrous, and, coupled with professionalism, a season of high expenses and low return, and the foundation of the Scottish League, the village club had lost the ability to compete. The club duly finished bottom of the Ayrshire League and could not fulfil one of its fixtures.

The club's last match in the Scottish Cup proper had been a 6–1 defeat at Ayr Parkhouse F.C. in the first round in 1890, and its final entry to the competition in 1896–97 saw the club scratch from the Cup rather than face Parkhouse in a proper tie; the clubs played out a friendly instead which Parkhouse won 9–4. That seems to have been the club's final match, as it "dropped out" of the Ayrshire association and there are no further matches for it. The club was formally removed from the Scottish FA in 1897 for no longer having a private ground.

== Colours ==
The club's colours were orange and black hooped jerseys, with white knickers. The club's change jersey was white.

== Grounds ==
The club seems to have played at the same ground from 1874 to 1883, normally known as Stonyholm Park, described as a private ground at Kirkstead, in the north of the village, and also as Bridgend Park.

On its revival the club played at Milton Park, which had a cinder track and pavilion.

== Honours ==
Scottish Cup

- Best run: last 8, 1889–90

Ayrshire Cup

- Winners: 1887–88
- Runners-up: 1879–80, 1886–87, 1892–93

Ayr Charity Cup

- Winners: 1888–89
- Runners-up: 1886–87

== Notable players ==
- Frank Watt, Scotland international
