= Hurlford F.C. =

Association football club in Scotland

Hurlford
- Full name: Hurlford Football Club
- Nickname: the Villagers
- Founded: 1875
- Dissolved: 1924
- Ground: Station Park
Home colours

Hurlford Football Club was a football club that existed from 1875 to 1924, from the village of Hurlford, Ayrshire, Scotland.

== History ==
The club was founded in 1875. The club was one of the strongest in Ayrshire in the pre-professional period, but, in common with fellow village clubs like Annbank F.C. and Mauchline F.C., the club found that the arrival of the Scottish League and the legalization of professionalism meant that it could not compete with those from the larger towns of Kilmarnock and Ayr.

=== Scottish Cup ===
The club entered the Scottish Cup for the first time in 1877–78, although did not win a tie for two years; when it finally did so, in 1879–80, the club reached the last 13, but had the misfortune to be drawn against Queen's Park F.C., at the time the strongest side in the country. The game, at Hampden Park, ended 15–1 to the home side, Hurlford's goal coming late on from the only attack it had all match; the blame was put on players leaving their positions to join in futile attacks and getting caught on the break, and that the goalkeeper "seemed to fear instead of being anxious to repel the approach of the ball".

The club's 1885–86 second round tie with Kilmarnock F.C. went to four replays before Hurlford finally won through, with a surprisingly easy 5–1 win at Rugby Park, only to lose 5–0 to Arthurlie F.C. in the third round.

The club's best season came in 1886–87. The club reached the quarter-final of the Scottish Cup for the only time. Drawn against Dumbarton F.C., the original tie at Station Park ended in a goalless draw, with Dumbarton playing under protest because of the state of the pitch. The replay at Boghead was played after a heavy snowfall, cleared from the pitch by the local unemployed, but the ground remained slippery, and, although the match went ahead, Dumbarton again only did so under protest. Hurlford came from behind to win 2–1, but despite evidence "pro and con" the protest, a Scottish FA committee unanimously favoured the bigger club, to the extent that they ordered the second replay to take place again at Boghead. Hurlford did not even receive any gate money from the tie as Dumbarton claimed it had all been spent on clearing the ground. In the second replay, Hurlford took the lead after 50 minutes, but within two minutes were behind, and ultimately lost 3–1.

Hurlford did put in a counter-protest but the Scottish FA conveniently postponed the hearing until after the semi-final, which Dumbarton won, so the protest was dismissed by 14 votes to 4. Nevertheless, many neutrals had "doubts as to whether justice had been fairly dealt to the Ayrshire men".

The club's main highlight afterwards was a 7–0 first round win over Ayr F.C. in 1888, although this was due to Ayr fielding a 'scratch' team, with the first XI playing a more lucrative friendly in England; after 1891, the club struggled to get through the qualifying rounds. The club continued to enter the Cup until 1922–23, its final tie being a 4–0 defeat at eventual winners Celtic F.C. in the second round, Joe Cassidy scoring all four goals and missing a penalty.

=== Local successes ===
The club reached the Ayrshire Cup final every season bar two from 1883 to 1894, although the club only won three finals in that period. The first win was in 1887, the "hardy tykes" of Hurlford - the club known for having smaller, faster players - beating the "rather brilliant but comparatively new" Kilbirnie F.C. at Rugby Park, with two goals from William Scobie and two from Johnny M'Knight.

Kilbirnie gained revenge the following season, at the same venue, helped by having the majority of the crowd behind it, but in 1889 the club beat Ayr F.C. (again at Rugby Park), having beaten Kilmarnock F.C. in the semi-final (after two replays). The win was considered a surprise, Ayr's "dark-shirted" side having a weight advantage over the "flash-coloured men" (averaging over 11 stone per player, compared to Hurlford's ten), and Hurlford missing players through injury, but Hurlford showed greater teamwork and first-half goals from Minford or M'Knight - both went up for a header together - and Goudie clinched the trophy.

The club's third triumph came in 1894, beating Saltcoats Victoria F.C. 2–1 at Holm Quarry in front of 5,000 spectators, but in the 20th century the competition lost its lustre, as the Scottish League teams started to enter reserve sides instead.

=== Leagues ===
Although the Ayrshire Football League was founded in 1891–92, Hurlford joined a league which covered the Scottish south-west, the Scottish Football Federation, instead. This was a competition of some quality, with 6 of its initial 12 clubs eventually joining the Scottish League, and Hurlford finished 3rd overall. However, the decision proved financially disastrous, with low crowds and high expenses, so, after one season, Hurlford withdrew. The club applied to join the Scottish Football Alliance, which had two vacancies, but was one of seven clubs which lost out in the ballot.

Instead the club joined the Ayrshire League for 1892–93. Hurlford finished 3rd out of 12 clubs, but for 1893–94 seven of the stronger clubs (including Hurlford) founded a new league, the Ayrshire Football Combination. Hurlford again finished 3rd, between Ayr F.C. and Kilmarnock F.C., but by 1897 both of those clubs had joined the Scottish League and the Ayrshire Combination was fell into disarray. The final season (1896–97) saw a number of fixtures not completed, with the championship to be decided between Ayr Parkhouse F.C. and Hurlford. The game that would decide the title should have taken place on 11 May 1897, being the replay of a fixture abandoned the previous November, with Parkhouse leading Hurlford 5–0 when bad light interfered; however Hurlford did not attend the replay and Parkhouse took the title.

The club intermittently played in the North Ayrshire Cup, which was competed for on a league basis for much of the 1900s, and played in the Ayrshire & Renfrewshire League in 1904–05, but the club only played two matches (winning both) before the league fell apart. It was however winner of the North Ayrshire Cup in 1905–06, played on a league basis with a final play-off, albeit by then there were a mere five sides left in it.

In 1906, the club joined the Scottish Football Combination, and, after an abortive second season in which the club withdrew after 2 matches, it remained a member until the league collapsed in 1911.

For 1912–13, the club joined the Scottish Football Union, in which the club remained until World War One. After the War, in 1919–20, with the Union defunct, the club joined the West of Scotland League, albeit it finished bottom in three of the next four seasons; a measure of the club's standing is that, in 1921–22, with its match at home to Dykehead F.C. unplayed, and Dykehead needing 2 points for the title, the League committee simply handed the trophy to Dykehead rather than make the clubs play out the match.

=== End of the club ===
The club finished bottom of the league in 1922–23, albeit a handful of fixtures remained unplayed, and the club was more or less level with Solway Star F.C. and a Queen's Park reserve side. At the end of the season, the Scottish League resolved to form a third division, and the clubs in the West of Scotland League were all invited; the only two clubs which did not decide to join were the Queen's Park side and Hurlford, who did not reply to the invitation, suggesting the club had wound up at the close of the season. The club remained members of the Scottish Football Association until August 1924, when the SFA struck Hurlford from the membership list.

== Colours ==
The club's colours were as follows:

Colours
Years	Jersey colour	Shorts	Socks
1875–78	Black & red hoops	Navy	
1878–79	Blue with white sash		
1879–86	Blue	White	Red
1886–88	White	White	
1888–92	Black, red, & gold vertical stripes		
1892–94	Black & white stripes	Navy	
1894–95	Black, red, & gold vertical stripes		
1895–97	Black & white stripes		
1897–1903	Blue	Navy	
1903–06	Red & white		
1906–11	Blue		
1911–12	Maroon		
1912–14	Black & white		
1914–23	Blue		

The club played an Ayr Charity Cup tie against Mauchline in February 1885 wearing all white, while Mauchline wore its "old [as in traditional] colours of blue and white stripes", suggesting that Hurlford was wearing a change kit.

== Grounds ==
The club played at a number of grounds in its early years:

- 1875–78: Mauchline Road
- 1878–80: Blair Park
- 1880–82: Struthens Park
- 1882–86: Drumbiehill Park
- 1886–88: Corsehill Park

In 1888, the club moved to the "splendid" Station Park, which became the club's permanent home.

== Honours ==
Scottish Cup

- Best run: last 8, 1886–87

Ayrshire Cup

- Winners: 1886–87, 1888–89, 1893–94, 1906–07, 1908–09, 1910–11
- Runners-up: 1883–84, 1884–85, 1887–88, 1889–90, 1890–91, 1891–92, 1911–12

North Ayrshire Cup

- Winners: 1905–06

Ayr Charity Cup

- Runners-up: 1890–91, 1912–13

Ayrshire Combination

- Runners-up: 1896–97

== Notable players ==
- Archie Goldie, often spelt "Goudie", who played up front for Hurlford, but became a defender for Liverpool F.C. and Small Heath F.C.
