= Annbank F.C. =

Association football club in Scotland

Annbank
- Full name: Annbank Football Club
- Nickname(s): the Miners, the Colliers
- Founded: 1879
- Dissolved: 1920
- Ground: Pebble Park
- Chairman: George Watson
- President: Alex. Martin
Home colours

Annbank Football Club was a football club that existed from 1879 to 1920, from the village of Annbank, Ayrshire, Scotland.

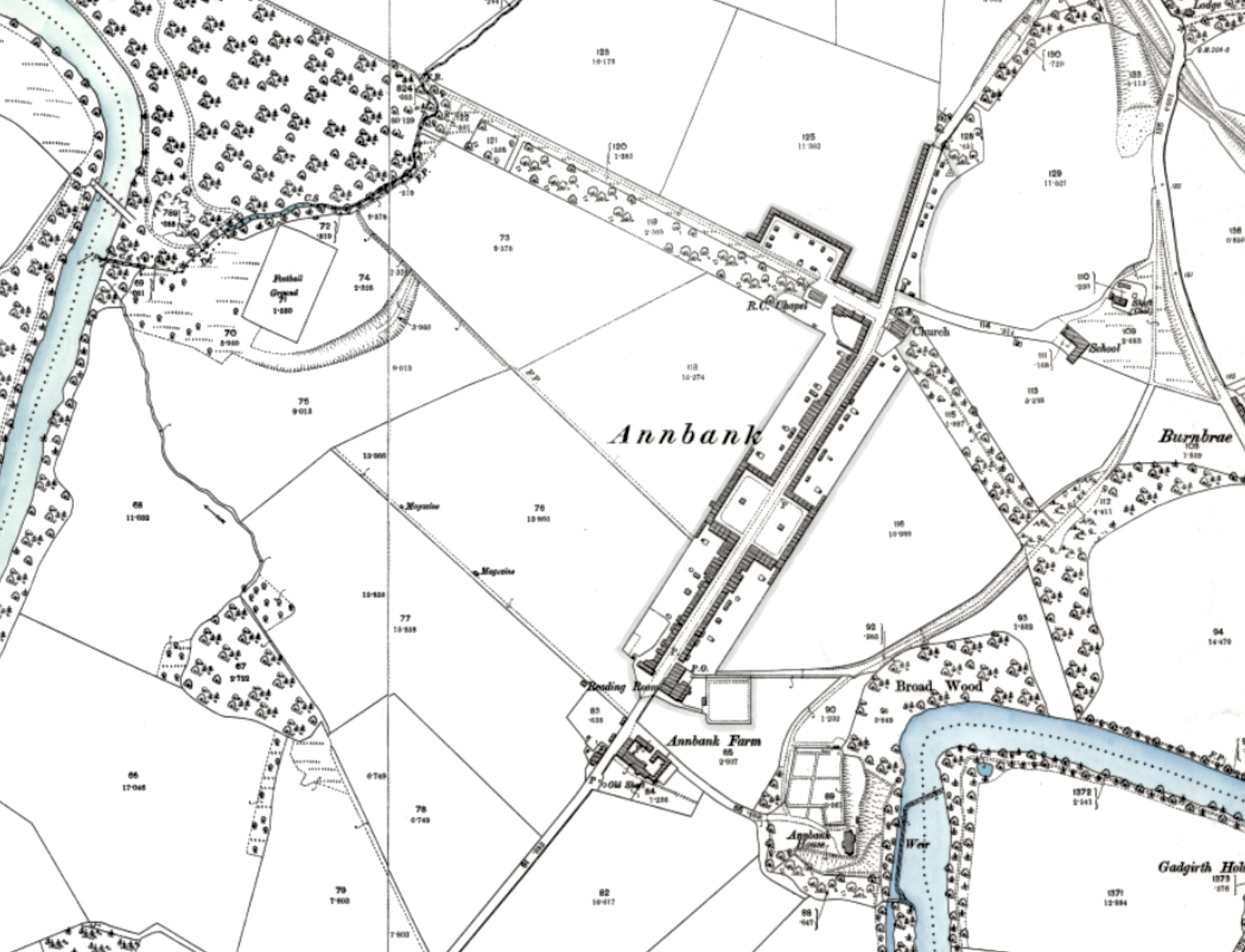
Pebble Park and the village of Annbank, from Ordnance Survey Ayrshire XXXIV.1, 1895

== History ==
The club was founded in 1879. In 1880, the club played its first competitive matches in the Ayrshire Cup, going all the way to the final, losing to Lugar Boswell.

The club entered the Scottish Cup for the first time in 1881–82. The club often punched its weight in the national competition, even reaching the quarter-finals on two occasions. The first quarter-final appearance came in 1884–85, and it included a win over Kilmarnock F.C. before a defeat at Hibernian.

Annbank's reputation was as a tough side and its players were often miners. In 1884, one of the Annbank players, goalkeeper Daniel Fitzsimmons, was arrested for assaulting an Ayr F.C. player during an Ayrshire Cup tie, and one of the club's forwards, Walter Dunlop, was seriously injured in a mining explosion which killed four of his co-workers. By the late 1880s, the club was one of the strongest in Ayrshire, winning the Ayrshire Cup for three years in four, and being good enough to beat the Scottish League aspirants Thistle F.C. 4–2 away from home in a friendly, despite walking off the field temporarily in protest at a refereeing decision.

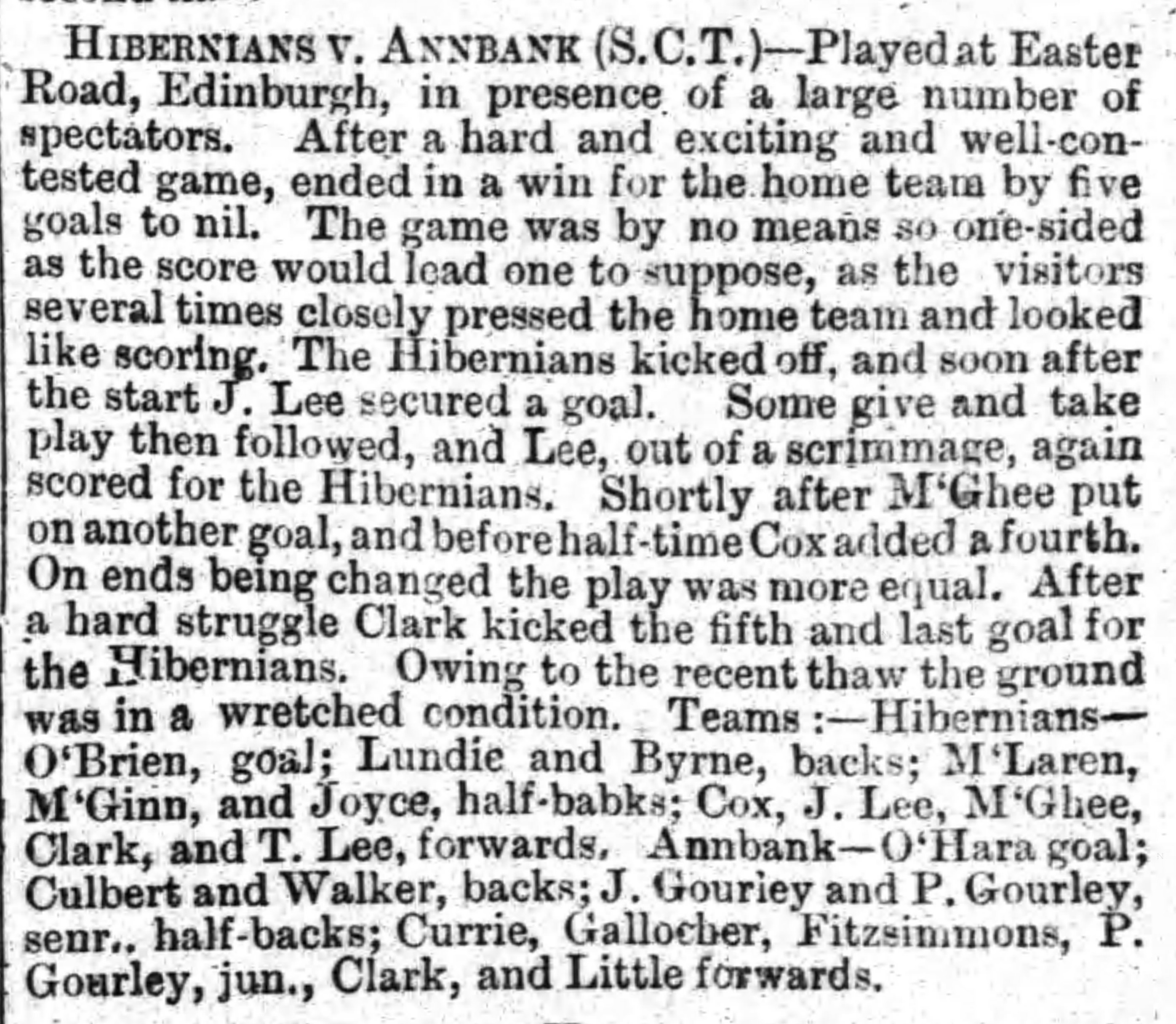
1884–85 Scottish Cup quarter-final, Hibernian 5–0 Annbank, Irvine Express, 2 January 1885

The club was also a regular invitee to the Ayr Charity Cup, an invitation for the leading four clubs in Ayrshire, losing the final in 1886 to Ayr, but won the final at Somerset Park against the same club in 1890, in front of a crowd of 3,000, winning 5–2.

Its reputation as a hard side to play survived into the early 1890s, the club's tactics in its second and last Scottish Cup quarter-final against Rangers F.C. in 1891–92 being described as kick and rush. Nevertheless, it was also a club with a reputation for a large female following.

=== Local leagues ===
In 1891, the club was a founder member of the Ayrshire Football League, winning the competition in its first two seasons. The second season had seen the league grow to 16 clubs, which both increased travel costs and reduced overall crowds, as some of the smaller clubs in the competition lacked the support of the more established clubs. In 1893, seven of them, including Annbank, therefore withdrew to form the Ayrshire Football Combination. Annbank again was the first champion, but after a mid-table finish in 1894–95 it withdrew. Kilmarnock joining the Scottish League in 1894–95, followed by Ayr in 1896–97, seem to have been disastrous for the club, simultaneously removing opponents that could generate revenue and diverting supporters to the higher standard League game.

Further, the introduction of the qualifying rounds for the Scottish Cup in 1891, and from 1894–95, the Scottish Qualifying Cup, was also detrimental to the club; Annbank won the first-ever Qualifying Cup, beating East Stirlingshire in the final at Underwood Park in Paisley, the ground of Abercorn F.C.; the Shire showed the greater skill, but the Miners, with the veteran "White" Gourlay marshalling the defence, gained something of a smash and grab victory. However the introduction of the qualifying rounds reduced the opportunities for the club to play national opposition. The same season the club reached the Ayrshire Cup final against Kilmarnock, but the clubs refused to play at the scheduled ground (Warner Park in Stevenston). The Ayrshire FA refused to award the trophy or medals, but Annbank and Kilmarnock played an unofficial final anyway, which Annbank won in a replay at Rugby Park.

After leaving the Ayrshire Combination, the club struggled to find an alternative league in which to play. In 1900–01, the club played in the North Ayrshire League, finishing second behind Beith F.C., but the competition only had 7 clubs, and the club withdrew from the competition the next season. In 1903–04 the club was one of the six founder members of the Ayrshire & Renfrewshire League, finishing third, but Annbank did not play in the league's second and final season.

The club's final attempt to play in a senior league was a disaster. In 1909, the club joined the Scottish Football Combination, but only played two matches - a win over a Queen's Park reserve side and a defeat at the 5th King's Own Scottish Borderers F.C. - before withdrawing.

=== Final years ===
The club continued to enter the Scottish Qualifying Cup until 1919–20, although it last reached the competition proper in 1910–11, losing to Motherwell F.C. in the first round. The club's defeat to Girvan F.C. in the first round of the qualifying cup in 1919 appears to have been the club's final match.

== Colours ==
The club's colours were as follows:

- 1879–86: white shirt with blue sash, white shorts
- 1886–89: red & white stripes
- 1889–90: cardinal & royal blue
- 1890–1920: white shirts with navy shorts

The club had adopted white shirts in time for the Ayr Charity Cup final in 1890.

== Grounds ==
The club played at Pebble Park, in Annbank.

== Notable players ==
- Johnny Graham, Annbank's only capped player, who later became one of Preston's Invincibles

== Honours ==
Scottish Cup

- Best run: last 8, 1884–85 and 1891–92

Scottish Qualifying Cup

- Winners: 1895–96

Ayrshire Cup

- Winners: 1889–90, 1891–92, 1892–93
- Unofficial winners: 1894–95
- Runners-up: 1879–80, 1902–03

Ayr Charity Cup

- Winners: 1889-90
- Runners-up: 1885-86

Ayrshire Football League

- Winners: 1891–92. 1892–93

Ayrshire Football Combination

- Winners: 1893-94
