= Ayrshire Cup =

Annual Scottish association football regional competition

- Founded: 1877
- Abolished: 1998
- Region: Ayrshire (Scotland)
- Last champions: Kilmarnock (1997–98 last competition)
- Most championships: Kilmarnock (43 titles)

The Ayrshire Cup was an annual association football regional competition in Scotland. The cup competition was a knockout tournament between football clubs in the historic county of Ayrshire. The Ayrshire Cup was first held in 1877–78, the trophy being a solid silver vase, 30 inches high, and valued at £100, designed by Messrs John Cameron & Son. The first winners were Mauchline.

The competition was most recently held in the 1997–98 season, when it was won by Kilmarnock. Although the Cup has not been competed for since, discussions have taken place between all the major participating clubs (Ayr United, Girvan and Kilmarnock) who have stated that they would welcome the return of the Ayrshire Cup.

== History ==
The Ayrshire Cup was first proposed by two medical students who tried to persuade Ayr United to invest into the competition. After failing to persuade the club, John Wallace, who was a local from Kilmarnock, offered to and did put in the finances needed to organise the event including allowing the town to choose the final venue of the cup.

The first time the Ayrshire Cup was competed for was in 1877–78, with the first winners being Mauchline. 26 clubs entered the first year of the competition, consisting of Catrine, Largs Western, Beith Thistle, Dalry Rangers, Kilmarnock, Kilbirnie, Ayr Academicals, Kilmarnock Cricket and Football Club, Kilmarnock Portland, Kilmarnock Dean, Kilmarnock Hawthorn, Kilmaurs Floors, Irvine, Mauchline, Burnfoothill Ramblers, Maybole Carrick, Tarbolton, Beith, Maybole Ladywell, Cumnock, Rankinston Mountaineers, Lanemark, Stewarton, Kilmarnock Star, Vale of Irvine, Girvan, and Hurlford.

The number of entrants for the cup peaked prior to World War II at over 40, however by 1946 Ayr United and Kilmarnock were the only entrants. In 1978–79 Girvan Amateurs joined the competition,. The last winner outside the 'big two' (being Ayr United and Kilmarnock) was Beith who won it in 1926–27.

Before penalty shoot-outs were introduced in 1970–71, if a cup final was tied it would be given to the club who won it the previous year. The last cup final was played in 1998 between Kilmarnock and Ayr United with Kilmarnock coming out victorious and as the last winner of the Ayrshire Cup.

The Ayrshire FA was dissolved in June 1999 when it was merged with the Renfrewshire and Lanarkshire FAs to form the West of Scotland FA. This was because the memberships of these associations had fallen below the 7-club threshold placed on them by the Scottish FA.

== Performance by club ==
	Club	Wins	Last win	Runners-up	Last final lost
1	Kilmarnock	43	1998	28	1997
2	Ayr United	26	1997	29	1998
3	Hurlford	6	1911	7	1912
4	Galston	6	1925	6	1924
5	Ayr	4	1910	3	1909
6	Annbank	4	1895	2	1903
7	Beith	3	1927	4	1938
8	Stevenston United	2	1920	2	1922
9	Kilmarnock Athletic	2	1883	0	
10	Ayr Parkhouse	1	1902	3	1910
10	Kilbirnie	1	1888	3	1893
11	Kilmarnock Portland	1	1882	2	1879
12	Lugar Boswell	1	1881	1	1883
13	Mauchline	1	1878	0	
13	Kilmarnock Athletic (1888)	1	1897	0	
15	Girvan	0		3	1982
16	Lanemark	0		1	1907
16	Stevenston Thistle	0		1	1901
16	Saltcoats Victoria	0		1	1894

== Ayrshire Cup Finals ==
=== Key ===
(R)	Replay, or repeat if original match was declared void
(SR)	Second Replay
‡	Match void
*	Match went to extra time
†	Match decided by a penalty shootout after extra time

=== Finals ===
Season	Winner	Score	Runner-up	Venue	Attendance	Notes
1877–78	Mauchline	4–3	Kilmarnock Portland	Holm Quarry, Kilmarnock	5,000	
1878–79	Kilmarnock Athletic	1–1 *	Kilmarnock Portland	Rugby Park, Kilmarnock		
1878–79 (R)	Kilmarnock Athletic	2–1 *	Kilmarnock Portland	Rugby Park, Kilmarnock	4,000	
1879–80	Beith	1–0	Kilbirnie	Holm Quarry, Kilmarnock	5,000	
1880–81	Lugar Boswell	5–0	Annbank	Rugby Park, Kilmarnock	5,000	
1881–82	Kilmarnock Portland	4–0	Kilmarnock	Holm Quarry, Kilmarnock		
1882–83	Kilmarnock Athletic	0–0*	Lugar Boswell	Rugby Park, Kilmarnock		
1882–83 (R)	Kilmarnock Athletic	3–2	Lugar Boswell	Rugby Park, Kilmarnock	4,000	
1883–84	Kilmarnock	2–2*	Hurlford	Holm Quarry, Kilmarnock		
1883–84 (R)	Kilmarnock	1–0	Hurlford	Holm Quarry, Kilmarnock		
1884–85	Kilmarnock	2–0	Hurlford	Holm Quarry, Kilmarnock	3,000	
1885–86	Kilmarnock	2–1	Ayr	Rugby Park, Kilmarnock		
1886–87	Hurlford	4–1	Kilbirnie	Rugby Park, Kilmarnock	6,000	
1887–88	Kilbirnie	4–3	Hurlford	Rugby Park, Kilmarnock	5,000	
1888–89	Hurlford	2–0	Ayr	Rugby Park, Kilmarnock	6,000	
1889–90	Annbank	3–2	Hurlford	Rugby Park, Kilmarnock	7,000	
1890–91	Kilmarnock	7–1	Hurlford	Holm Quarry, Kilmarnock		
1891–92	Annbank	3–0	Hurlford	Rugby Park, Kilmarnock		
1892–93	Annbank	5–2	Kilbirnie	Rugby Park, Kilmarnock		
1893–94	Hurlford	2–2*	Saltcoats Victoria	Holm Quarry, Kilmarnock		
1893–94 (R)	Hurlford	2–1	Saltcoats Victoria	Holm Quarry, Kilmarnock	5,000	
1894–95	Annbank	2–2*	Kilmarnock	Rugby Park, Kilmarnock		
1894–95 (R)	Annbank	4–2	Kilmarnock	Rugby Park, Kilmarnock		
1895–96	Kilmarnock	7–2	Galston	Holm Quarry, Kilmarnock	5,000	
1896–97	Kilmarnock Athletic (1888)	1–1*	Kilmarnock	Beresford Park, Ayr		
1896–97 (R)	Kilmarnock Athletic (1888)	3–0	Kilmarnock	Somerset Park, Ayr		
1897–98	Kilmarnock	9–3	Galston	Holm Quarry, Kilmarnock		
1898–99	Kilmarnock	6–3	Galston	Rugby Park, Kilmarnock		
1899–1900	Kilmarnock	4–0	Ayr Parkhouse	Somerset Park, Ayr	4,000 - 5,000	
1900–01	Ayr	1–1*	Stevenston Thistle	Rugby Park, Kilmarnock	6,000	
1900–01 (R)	Ayr	2–1	Stevenston Thistle	Rugby Park, Kilmarnock	3,000 - 4,000	
1901–02	Ayr Parkhouse	1–0	Galston	Rugby Park, Kilmarnock		
1902–03	Galston	4–3‡	Annbank	Beresford Park, Ayr		
1902–03	Galston	1–1‡	Annbank	Rugby Park, Kilmarnock	3,000	
1902–03	Galston	2–0	Annbank	Somerset Park, Ayr		
1903–04	Galston	4–1	Beith	Rugby Park, Kilmarnock		
1904–05	Ayr	1–0	Kilmarnock	Beresford Park, Ayr	5,000	
1905–06	Ayr	1–0	Ayr Parkhouse	Beresford Park, Ayr	3,800	
1906–07	Hurlford	3–1	Lanemark	Somerset Park, Ayr		
1907–08	Galston	2–2*	Kilmarnock	Somerset Park, Ayr		
1907–08 (R)	Galston	2–1	Kilmarnock	Rugby Park, Kilmarnock		
1908–09	Hurlford	1–1*	Ayr	Beresford Park, Ayr		
1908–09 (R)	Hurlford	1–0	Ayr	Beresford Park, Ayr		
1909–10	Ayr	1–0	Ayr Parkhouse	Somerset Park, Ayr	5,000	
1910–11	Hurlford	3–2	Ayr United	Beresford Park, Ayr		
1911–12	Ayr United	2–0	Hurlford	Beresford Park, Ayr		
1912–13	Galston	3–3*	Ayr United	Rugby Park, Kilmarnock		
1912–13 (R)	Galston	2–1	Ayr United	Rugby Park, Kilmarnock		
1913–14	Galston	3–2	Stevenston United	Rugby Park, Kilmarnock		
1914–15	Stevenston United	0–0*	Kilmarnock	Riverside Park, Galston		
1914–15 (R)	Stevenston United	2–1 *	Kilmarnock	Riverside Park, Galston		
No competition from 1915–16 to 1918–19 due to World War I
1919–20	Stevenston United	1–0	Galston	Rugby Park, Kilmarnock		
1920–21	Kilmarnock					
1921–22	Kilmarnock	5–2	Stevenston United	Rugby Park, Kilmarnock		
1922–23	Kilmarnock	5–0	Ayr United			
1923–24	Beith		Galston			
1924–25	Galston	4–1	Kilmarnock	Rugby Park, Kilmarnock	1,000	
1925–26	Ayr United	3–3 (agg)	Beith			
1925–26 (R)	Ayr United	4–1	Beith			
1926–27	Beith					
1927–28	Kilmarnock					
1928–29	Ayr United	5–1	Kilmarnock	Somerset Park, Ayr	1,000	
1929–30	Kilmarnock					
1930–31	Kilmarnock	5–1	Beith	Rugby Park, Kilmarnock		
1931–32	Incomplete					
1932–33	Ayr United	3–1	Kilmarnock		2,000	
1933–34	No Competition					
1934–35	Kilmarnock	3–3*	Ayr United			
1934–35 (R)	Kilmarnock	8–0	Ayr United			
1935–36	Ayr United	2–2*	Kilmarnock			
1935–36 (R)	Ayr United	3–2	Kilmarnock			
1936–37	No Competition					
1937–38	Ayr United	7–1	Beith			
1938–39	Ayr United	2–2*	Kilmarnock			
1938–39 (R)	Ayr United	3–1	Kilmarnock			
No competition from 1939–40 to 1945–46 due to World War II
1946–47	Kilmarnock	4–2	Ayr United			
1947–48	No Competition					
1948–49	No Competition					
1949–50	Ayr United	3–1 (agg)	Kilmarnock			
1950–51	Kilmarnock	6–1 (agg)	Ayr United			
1951–52	Kilmarnock	4–3 (agg)	Ayr United			
1952–53	Kilmarnock	5–0 (agg)	Ayr United			
1953–54	Kilmarnock	5–1 (agg)	Ayr United			
1954–55	Kilmarnock	3–0	Ayr United			
1955–56	Kilmarnock	7–0 (agg)	Ayr United			
1956–57	Kilmarnock	1–0	Ayr United			
1957–58	Ayr United	2–1 (agg)	Kilmarnock			
1958–59	Kilmarnock	4–4 (agg)	Ayr United			
1959–60	Kilmarnock	3–2 (agg)	Ayr United			
1960–61	Ayr United	3–0	Kilmarnock			
1961–62	Kilmarnock	7–2 (agg)	Ayr United			
1962–63	Incomplete					
1963–64	Incomplete					
1964–65	Ayr United	1–0	Kilmarnock			
1965–66	Kilmarnock	3–1 (agg)	Ayr United			
1966–67	Incomplete					
1967–68	Incomplete					
1968–69	Ayr United		Kilmarnock			
1969–70	Ayr United	2–0	Kilmarnock			
1970–71	Ayr United	2–2 (agg) (5–4p)†	Kilmarnock			
1971–72	Kilmarnock	3–1 (agg)	Ayr United			
1972–73	Kilmarnock	2–1 (agg)	Ayr United			
1973–74	Kilmarnock	1–1 (5–4p)†	Ayr United			
1974–75	Ayr United	1–0	Kilmarnock			
1975–76	Ayr United	4–0 (agg)	Kilmarnock			
1976–77	Ayr United	2–2 (6–5p)†	Kilmarnock			
1977–78	Ayr United	2–1	Kilmarnock			
1978–79	Kilmarnock	4–0	Girvan			
1979–80	Ayr United	10–2 (agg)	Girvan			
1980–81	Kilmarnock	2–0 (agg)	Ayr United			
1981–82	Kilmarnock	12-0	Girvan			
1982–83	Kilmarnock	1–0	Ayr United			
1983–84	Kilmarnock	2–1	Ayr United			
1984–85	Kilmarnock	2–1	Ayr United			
1985–86	Ayr United	2–1	Kilmarnock			
1986–87	Kilmarnock	3–0	Ayr United			
1987–88	Ayr United	2–0	Kilmarnock			
1988–89	Ayr United	2–0	Kilmarnock			
1989–90	Kilmarnock	2–1*	Ayr United			
1990–91	Ayr United	2–1	Kilmarnock			
1991–92	Kilmarnock	4–0	Ayr United			
1992–93	Kilmarnock	2–1	Ayr United			
1993–94	Kilmarnock	3–3 (3–2p)†	Ayr United		3,613	
1994–95	Ayr United	4–3	Kilmarnock			
1995–96	Kilmarnock	1–0	Ayr United			
1996–97	Ayr United	2–0	Kilmarnock		2,176	
1997–98	Kilmarnock	4–2	Ayr United		4,652	

== See also ==
- Ayrshire derby

== Notes ==
1. Includes one title shared between Kilmarnock and Ayr United in 1959
2. Annbank and Kilmarnock refused to play the final at Warner Park, Stevenston, which had been stipulated as the venue by the Ayrshire Football Association. The cup and badges were withheld but the teams played a game for the Championship.
3. The game at Somerset Park on 18 April 1902 was unfinished due to a break-in by Annbank supporters. Annbank lodged another protest regarding Ralston of Galston but this was thrown out by the Ayrshire F.A. The Association also voted by 7 votes to 2 to award the Cup to Galston as Annbank had wanted the game replayed as the game had not been completed. This was after a protested game won 4-3 by Galston at Beresford Park, Ayr and a 1-1 draw at Rugby Park, Kilmarnock on 11 April
4. Title shared between Kilmarnock and Ayr United

== Ayrshire Cups in other categories ==
Ayrshire Cups continue to operate at Junior level – the region's clubs have a strong presence nationally, winning the Scottish Junior Cup on multiple occasions – and in the local amateur league.

The Ayrshire Cup was last run in the 2017-18 season, with Kilwinning Rangers winning the last edition after defeating Largs Thistle.
