= Ayr Parkhouse F.C. =

Former association football club in Scotland

Ayr Parkhouse
- Full name: Ayr Parkhouse Football Club
- Nickname: The Parkies
- Founded: 1886
- Dissolved: 1910
- Ground: Ballantyne Drive (1886); Racecourse (1886–1888); Beresford Park (1888–1910)
Home colours

Ayr Parkhouse Football Club were a football club from the town of Ayr in Scotland. The club was a member of the Scottish Football League until 1910, when they merged with neighbours Ayr to form Ayr United.

== History ==
Ayr Parkhouse were formed in 1886 and took their name from the Parkhouse farmhouse where the club's players trained, William Frew, a centre-forward for Parkhouse, was the son of the farmer who owned it. They initially played their home games at Ballantine Drive, before moving to the Ayr Racecourse ground, now known as the Old Racecourse. In 1888 Ayr vacated the better developed Beresford Park, and Ayr Parkhouse moved in, where they played for the remainder of their existence, although altering the ground since moving in, . In 1891 they joined the Ayrshire Football League, but moved onto the Ayrshire Football Combination in 1893, of which they were founder members along with Ayr with whom they would develop a healthy rivalry.

However, Ayr Parkhouse decided to remain a faithfully amateur club, only turning professional in 1905. Despite the club's amateur status, they competed well in their league and the Scottish Cup, reaching the quarter finals of the competition in the 1894–95 season, where they fell to that year's runners-up Renton.

Local success continued, but the rivalry that was built up with Ayr ceased to have a regular outlet when that club were admitted to membership of the Scottish Football League in 1897. Ayr Parkhouse's ambitions were beginning to outgrow their local successes and the club's early amateurness fuelled hostility to membership of the professional Scottish Football League was waning. In 1901 they unsuccessfully applied for membership, but, after finishing second in the Scottish Amateur Football League they managed to get elected to full league status in 1903, just ahead of St. Johnstone. Their initial season in the league was a disaster. They finished bottom of Division Two and therefore had to reapply for membership, but they declined to do so. Aberdeen were elected instead.

After two seasons out of the league, playing instead in the Scottish Football Combination, Ayr Parkhouse were accepted back into the Second Division. This was in 1906. The club performed without much distinction in the following four seasons. At the end of the 1909–10 season, Ayr and Ayr Parkhouse merged to form Ayr United.

== Colours ==
The club's colours were blue and white, usually in the combination of striped or hooped jerseys and white shorts, other than from 1892 to 1894 when it wore plain dark blue jerseys.

== Honours ==
Ayrshire Cup

- Winners (1): 1901–02

Ayrshire Consolation Cup

- Winners (1): 1897–98

Ayr Charity Cup

- Winners (7): 1893–94, 1894–95, 1895–96, 1896–97, 1897–98, 1898–99, 1905–06

Kilmarnock Charity Cup

- Winners (2): 1894–95, 1896–97

Scottish 2nd XI Cup

- Runners-up (1): 1901–02

== Notable former players ==
- Alex Bell: transferred to Manchester United in 1902. He was Manchester United's first Scotland international, in 1912.
- John Cameron
- Robert Capperauld
