= Saltcoats Victoria F.C. =

Association football club in Scotland

Saltcoats Victoria
- Full name: Saltcoats Victoria Football Club
- Nickname: The Seasiders
- Founded: 1889 (re-formed 1911)
- Ground: Campbell Park, Saltcoats
- Coordinates: 55°38′1″N 4°46′11″W
- Chairman: Robert Latta
- Manager: Stevie Wilson
- League: West of Scotland League Fourth Division
- 2025–26: West of Scotland League Fourth Division, 12th of 16
- Website: https://saltcoatsvictoria.co.uk/
Home colours

Saltcoats Victoria Football Club is a Scottish football club based in the town of Saltcoats, North Ayrshire. Nicknamed the Seasiders, the club was originally formed in 1889 and plays at Campbell Park. They currently compete in the West of Scotland League Fourth Division.

== History ==
=== Scottish Junior Cup ===
Saltcoats won the Scottish Junior Cup, for the only time in their history, in 1925. The final, against Glasgow based St Anthony's, took place on 23 May of that year, in front of an 18,000 crowd at Firhill Stadium. The match ended in a 1–1 draw and a replay was scheduled for 30 May. This replay ended in a 3–3 draw at McKenna park in Glasgow. A third and final tie-breaker was once again played at Firhill on 6 June, with Saltcoats winning 2–1.

== Current squad ==
As of 11 November 2026

Note: Flags indicate national team as defined under FIFA eligibility rules; some limited exceptions apply. Players may hold more than one non-FIFA nationality.

No.	Pos.	Nation	Player
—	GK	SCO	Calum Robertson
—	GK	SCO	Thomas Barrett
—	DF	SCO	Adem Whyte
—	DF	SCO	Jack Hanlon
—	DF	SCO	Jamie Stirling
—	DF	SCO	Ross Agnew
—	DF	SCO	Ryan Ritchie
—	MF	SCO	Aaron Robertson
—	MF	SCO	Andrew McIntyre
—	MF	SCO	Brian McCullough
—	MF	SCO	Cameron McIntyre
—	MF	SCO	Dean Wilson
—	MF	SCO	Euan Kolankaya
—	MF	SCO	Finlay Smith

No.	Pos.	Nation	Player
—	MF	SCO	Haydon Barrett
—	MF	NGR	Olamilekan Adebomi
—	MF	SCO	Reiss Love
—	MF	SCO	Ruaridh Thompson
—	MF	SCO	Rudi Johnston
—	MF	SCO	Sean McGillivray
—	MF	SCO	Shayne O'Neill
—	FW	SCO	David Sawyers
—	FW	SCO	Euan Anderson
—	FW	SCO	Gary Brown
—	FW	SCO	Lewis Donachy
—	FW	SCO	Owen McGhee
—	FW	SCO	Taylor Clark

== Coaching staff ==
As of 10 October 2026

Position	Name
Manager	Stevie Wilson
Assistant Manager	Davey Wilson
Coach	Malky Stevenson
Goalkeeping Coach	Chris Lamb

== Campbell Park ==
Campbell Park is now owned by North Ayrshire Council. The grandstand was destroyed by a severe storm in the early 1970s. The changing rooms were maintained for some years after, but now the club relies on pre-fabricated facilities. After these facilities were deemed unsuitable, the club was forced to groundshare with local rivals Ardeer Thistle for three years before returning in 2011 with new 'vandal-proof' facilities being installed.

== Support and Community ==
Saltcoats has always had loyal support, and locals have shown in the past that they will turn out in numbers for big games. When Saltcoats twice reached the quarter-final stage of the Scottish Junior Cup in the 1970s, the home legs both attracted an estimated 3,000+ supporters. Like many Junior clubs, Saltcoats relies on a hard-working committee and sponsors to maintain revenue.

The team is currently managed by Stevie Wilson.

== Honours ==
Scottish Junior Cup

- Winners (1): 1924–25

=== Other Honours ===
- West of Scotland Cup winners: 1945–46, 1946–47
- Ayrshire First Division winners: 1923–24, 1925–26, 1926–27, 1938–39, 1945–46
- Ayrshire Second Division winners: 1992–93
- Ayrshire (Ardrossan & Saltcoats Herald) Cup: 1911–12, 1937–38, 1939–40, 1946–47
- Ayrshire League (Kerr & Smith) Cup: 1926–27, 1932–33, 1937–38, 1945–46
- Ayrshire District (Irvine Times) Cup: 1923–24, 1924–25, 1937–38, 1952–53
- Western Junior League Cup: 1926–27
- Irvine & District League: 1912–13

== Former players ==
1. Players that have played/managed in the Scottish Football League or any foreign equivalent to this level (i.e. fully professional league).
2. Players with full international caps.
3. Players that hold a club record or have captained the club.

- (Scotland) Allan Craig
- (Scotland) Johnny Crosbie
- (Scotland) (United States) Jack Marshall
- (Scotland) David McKellar
- (Scotland) Ray Montgomerie
- (Scotland) Jimmy Simpson
