= Beith F.C. =

Former association football club in Scotland

Beith
- Full name: Beith Football Club
- Nickname(s): The Cabinet Makers, the Cabes
- Founded: 1875
- Dissolved: 1938
- Ground: Bellsdale Park, Beith
Home colours

Beith Football Club were a football club based at Bellsdale Park in Beith, Scotland. The club were members of the Scottish Football League from 1923 to 1926.

== History ==
The club was initially formed in 1875 and were founder members of the Ayrshire Football Association in 1877, but went into abeyance in 1883 and did not re-emerge fully until 1888. Nicknamed 'the cabinet makers', they joined the Ayrshire Football League in 1891 and would later play in the Scottish Football Combination, winning that competition in 1905. Around this time the club featured goalkeeper Hugh McDonald, who later had some success at Woolwich Arsenal. They eventually ended up in the Western League, which was incorporated by the Scottish Football League as its new Third Division for the 1923–24 season.

Beith lasted the Division's three seasons, finishing 7th, 13th and 12th, but were not retained by the League. The club joined the Scottish Football Alliance, playing against Galston and reserve teams of the Scottish Football League First Division clubs. Beith won the Scottish Qualifying Cup in 1928 and won the Scottish Qualifying Cup South in 1932, 1933 and 1935. When the First Division clubs decided that only their reserve teams could play in their reserve league, Beith were left without a competition to play in. The club decided in 1938 to leave the senior ranks and become Beith Juniors. and join the Western League North Division for 1939–40 season.

== Stadium ==
- 1875–1882 Gateside Toll
- 1882–1883 Marshalland
- 1888–1894 Knockbuckle
- 1894–1903 James Meadow (Muir Field)
- 1903–1915 Glebe Park
- 1919 Kersland Field Glengarnock
- 1920–1938 Bellsdale Park.

== Honours ==
- Scottish Combination League
  - Champions: 1904–05
- Scottish Qualifying Cup
  - Winners: 1928
- Scottish Qualifying Cup South
  - Winners: 1932, 1933, 1935
- Ayrshire FA Challenge Cup
  - Winners: 1880, 1924, 1927
- North Ayrshire Cup
  - Winners: 1906, 1924, 1927
- Ayrshire Qualifying Cup
  - Winners: 1927, 1928
- Ayrshire Consolation Cup
  - Winners: 1904
- Ayr Charity Cup
  - Winners: 1908
- Kilmarnock Charity Cup
  - Winners: 1881
