= Ayr F.C. =

Former association football club in Scotland

Ayr
- Full name: Ayr Football Club
- Nickname(s): The Auld Town
- Founded: 1879
- Dissolved: 1910
- Ground: Springvale Park (1879–1884); Beresford Park (1884–1888); Somerset Park (1888–1910)
Home colours

Ayr Football Club was a Scottish Football League club from Ayr, Scotland. They were formed in 1879 by a merger of the Ayr Thistle and Ayr Academicals football clubs. Their initial home ground was Springvale Park, which they left in 1884 to play home fixtures at Beresford Park, which they in turn left in 1888 to move to Somerset Park. Ayr won their first ever game at Somerset Park 3–0 against Aston Villa.

Ayr had spent 13 seasons in the Scottish Football League Division Two, with a best finish of third place which they managed on three occasions. They never won promotion above this level. Ayr F.C. merged with fellow league members Ayr Parkhouse in 1910 to form Ayr United. This is the first and only example in Scottish football of a merger between two league clubs from the same town. The merger came about because it was felt that a merged club would have better prospects of playing in Division One. Ayr United achieved that status three years after the merger.

== Origins ==
In 1879 two clubs from Ayr, Ayr Thistle and Ayr Academicals, merged to form a new club, the team was to be called Ayr F.C. and Springvale Park was chosen as the home ground. However, the club did retain the Academicals name for its Athletics section. There was a team simply called Ayr prior to the existence of Ayr F.C. but there is no connection between the two clubs. Shortly after the merger, a team calling themselves Ayr Thistle F.C. appeared briefly and shared only a name with the previous Ayr Thistle and no connection to the then-newly formed Ayr F.C., however, they did not last long. The Ayr Academicals name was also revived around 1884 and again had no connection to Ayr F.C.

== History ==
At the time of the merger, two other prominent Ayr Clubs were Ayr Rovers F.C., who played at Savoy Park and Ayr Robert Burns F.C., who played at Mair Park and Virginia Park respectively. Ayr F.C. played both in their early years and in their first season they competed in the Scottish Cup for the first time, although they were put out in the First Round by Kilmarnock Athletic and the following season they recorded a 20-0 (twenty) over Dreghorn Black Watch in the Ayrshire Cup. Two weeks after this match they travelled to Belfast for an Exhibition match with Cliftonville, the Ayr side winning 4–1. These 'exhibition games' were regular and saw some of the biggest teams of the day play against the Ayr side, for example, Aston Villa played against Ayr no more than four times, three times in Ayr, once in Birmingham. By the turn of the century Ayr F.C. had also played in these exhibition matches against Sunderland, Preston North End and Bolton Wanderers. In 1884, Ayr F.C. moved the short distance from Springvale Park to Beresford Park at the top of the town (on the site that Odeon now stands). The inauguration match was won 3–1 against a side called Glasgow Pilgrims. The club's reserve side also had some success, with the 'Ayr Strollers' winning the 1887-88 Scottish Second XI Cup.

In 1888, problems arose when the Annual Cattle Show was scheduled earlier than usual. The Cattle Show required Beresford Park and adjoining fields, but Ayr F.C. had a friendly arranged with Aston Villa on a conflicting date. This saw the club move north of the River Ayr to Somerset Park, originally renting it from Walker's Chemical Works, situated just to the north. They also brought their clubhouse and grandstand with them from Beresford Park. Further adjustments to the ground for about a decade saw the club left with a debt of £600 in 1898. Ayr F.C.'s departure from Beresford Park, saw Ayr Parkhouse move in, and eventually developed a rivalry between the two clubs as the team from south of the river grew. A further important event in the club's history took place in 1888, when Ayr took on Canada and won convincingly 4–0 at the new Somerset Park.

Between March and April 1897 Somerset Park was closed as the club changed the orientation of the pitch and to include a tarmacadam cycle track as well as a new grandstand. This was the format the ground would stay until the 1920s when it was changed to its current layout (by Ayr United).

In 1901 Ayr F.C. won the Ayrshire Cup meaning the trophy would come back to the county town for the first time after defeating Stevenston Thistle 2–1 in a replay at Rugby Park. The club would go on to have further success in this competition, winning it again in 1905, 1906 and 1910, twice beating rivals Ayr Parkhouse in the final (in 1906 and 1910, in 1905 the beat Kilmarnock 1–0 to lift the trophy).

== Grounds ==
- 1879–1884 Springfield Park
- 1884–1888 Beresford Park
- 1888–1910 Somerset Park

== Honours ==
- Scottish County League
  - Champions (1): 1899–1900
- Ayrshire Combination
  - Champions (3): 1894–95, 1895–96, 1896–97
- Ayrshire Cup
  - Winners (4): 1900–01, 1904–05, 1905–06, 1909–10
- Ayr Charity Cup
  - Winners (8): 1884–85, 1885–86, 1886–87, 1890–91, 1892–93, 1900–01, 1901–02, 1904–05
- Kilmarnock Charity Cup
  - Winners (2): 1884–85, 1886–87

== Colours ==
1879–1910, Crimson & gold halved shirts, white shorts, crimson with gold top socks.
