= 1880s Kilmarnock F.C. seasons =

== 1880–81 season ==
Kilmarnock
1880–81 season
- Stadium: Rugby Park
- Scottish Cup: Third round
- Ayrshire Cup: Third round
Home colours

Season 1880–81 was the eighth season of competitive football by Kilmarnock.

=== Overview ===
Kilmarnock entered the Scottish Cup for the eighth time and also competed in the Ayrshire Cup. For the first time, Killie reached the third round of the Scottish Cup following a walkover against Stewarton Cunninghame in the first round and a 6–3 win against Ayr in the second round. A 3–3 draw against Mauchline set up third round replay in which Kilmarnock lost 3–0 at Rugby Park. In the first round of the Ayrshire Cup, Kilmarnock drew 2–2 with Barkip before winning the replay 7–0 in at Rugby Park. Kilmarnock required a second replay to see off Cronberry Eglinton after 5–5 and 2–2 draws before they lost 5–0 to Coylton Coila in the third round.

During the club's early years, the team would play in Oxford blue shirts, white shorts and Oxford blue socks. The now traditional blue and white vertical stripes weren't introduced until 1896.

=== Scottish Cup ===
Date	Round	Opponents	H / A	Result F–A	Scorers	Attendance
September 1880	First round	Stewarton Cunninghame	w/o			
9 October 1880	Second round	Ayr	H	6–3		
23 October 1880	Third round	Mauchline	A	1–2		3,000
6 November 1880	Third round	Mauchline	A	3–3		
13 November 1880	Third round replay	Mauchline	H	0–3		1,000

Notes

1. A- Kilmarnock protested that the full 90 minutes wasn't played. The Scottish Football Association upheld the protest and a rematch was ordered.

=== Ayrshire Cup ===
Date	Round	Opponents	H / A	Result F–A	Scorers	Attendance
30 October 1880	First round	Barkip	A	2–2		
20 November 1880	First round replay	Barkip	H	7–0		
27 November 1880	Second round	Cronberry Eglinton	A	5–5		
4 December 1880	Second round replay	Cronberry Eglinton	N	2–2		
January 1881	Second round second replay	Cronberry Eglinton	N	x–x		
5 February 1881	Second round third replay	Cronberry Eglinton	N	1–0		
February 1881	Third round	Coylton Coila	A	0–5		

== 1881–82 season ==
Kilmarnock
1881–82 season
- Stadium: Rugby Park
- Scottish Cup: Fifth round
- Ayrshire Cup: Runners-up
- Kilmarnock Merchants' Charity Cup: First round
Home colours

Season 1881–82 was the ninth season of competitive football by Kilmarnock.

=== Overview ===
Kilmarnock entered the Scottish Cup for the ninth time and also competed in the Ayrshire Cup and the Kilmarnock Merchants' Charity Cup. In the Scottish Cup, they defeated Largs Athletic 6–0 in the first round before defeating Auchinleck Boswell 7–1 to go through to the third round for the second consecutive season. Kilmarnock then won 2–0 against Kilbirnie to reach the fourth round for the first time. They progressed even further after beating Dundee Our Boys 9–2 before losing 4–1 to Arthurlie in the fifth round.

In the Ayrshire Cup, Kilmarnock reached the final for the first time. A 2–0 win against Kilbirnie in the first round was followed up by away wins against Rankinston and Beith Thistle. Kilmarnock won their fourth round match against Lanemark 3–0 before they were given a bye in the semi-finals. The final was an all-Kilmarnock affair as Kilmarnock met Kilmarnock Portland at the neutral Holm Quarry. Playing in their first-ever cup final on 25 March 1882, Kilmarnock lost 4–0 as Portland won the Ayrshire Cup for the first time.

Lugar Boswell were the opponents for Kilmarnock's first tie in the Kilmarnock Merchants' Charity Cup but the match ended in disappointment as Lugar won 4–0 at Rugby Park.

=== Scottish Cup ===
Date	Round	Opponents	H / A	Result F–A	Scorers	Attendance
10 September 1881	First round	Largs Athletic	H	6–0		
8 October 1881	Second round	Auchinleck Boswell	H	7–1		
22 October 1881	Third round	Kilbirnie	H	2–0		
19 November 1881	Fourth round	Dundee Our Boys	H	9–2		
10 December 1881	Fifth round	Arthurlie	A	1–4		2,000

=== Ayrshire Cup ===
Date	Round	Opponents	H / A	Result F–A	Scorers	Attendance
1 October 1881	First round	Kilbirnie	A	2–0		
5 November 1881	Second round	Rankinston	H	6–3		
14 January 1882	Third round	Beith Thistle	A	2–1		
28 January 1882	Third round	Beith Thistle	A	4–0		
4 February 1882	Fourth round	Lanemark	H	3–0		
March 1882	Semi-final	Bye				
25 March 1882	Final	Kilmarnock Portland	N	0–4		

Notes

1. B- A protest from Beith Thistle was upheld and a rematch was ordered.

=== Kilmarnock Merchants' Charity Cup ===
Date	Round	Opponents	H / A	Result F–A	Scorers	Attendance
1 April 1882	First round	Lugar Boswell	H	0–4		

=== Friendly ===
Date	Opponents	H / A	Result F–A	Scorers	Attendance
3 September 1881	Heart of Midlothian	A	4–2		

== 1882–83 season ==
Kilmarnock
1882–83 season
- Stadium: Rugby Park
- Scottish Cup: Second round
- Ayrshire Cup: Third round
- Kilmarnock Merchants' Charity Cup: First round
Home colours

Season 1882–83 was the 10th season of competitive football by Kilmarnock.

=== Overview ===
Kilmarnock entered the Scottish Cup for the 10th time and also competed in the Ayrshire Cup and the Kilmarnock Merchants' Charity Cup. In the Scottish Cup, they defeated Mauchline 2–0 in the first round before they were eliminated by Hurlford following a 6–2 defeat. Hurlford also knocked Kilmarnock out of the Ayrshire Cup in the third round while Annbank defeated Killie in the first round of the Kilmarnock Merchants' Charity Cup.

=== Scottish Cup ===
Date	Round	Opponents	H / A	Result F–A	Scorers	Attendance
16 September 1882	First round	Mauchline	H	2–0		
30 September 1882	Second round	Hurlford	H	2–6		

=== Ayrshire Cup ===
Date	Round	Opponents	H / A	Result F–A	Scorers	Attendance
7 October 1882	First round	Hurlford	A	1–4		

=== Kilmarnock Merchants' Charity Cup ===
Date	Round	Opponents	H / A	Result F–A	Scorers	Attendance
31 March 1883	First round	Annbank	H	2–4		

== 1883–84 season ==
Kilmarnock
1883–84 season
- Stadium: Rugby Park
- Scottish Cup: Third round
- Ayrshire Cup: Winners
- Kilmarnock Merchants' Charity Cup: Winners
Home colours

Season 1883–84 was the 11th season of competitive football by Kilmarnock.

=== Overview ===
Kilmarnock entered the Scottish Cup for the 11th time and also competed in the Ayrshire Cup and Kilmarnock Merchants' Charity Cup. A walkover win came in the first round of the Scottish Cup as Kilbirnie failed to raise a team. In the second round, Kilmarnock saw off Hurlford 3–0 before they were eliminated in the third round by Thornliebank in a match that had to be replayed after the original result was declared void.

In the Ayrshire Cup, Kilmarnock reached the final for the second time after a walkover against Kilmarnock Portland was followed by wins against Maybole, Lugar Boswell and Kilmarnock Athletic. Hurlford were their opponents in the final at Holm Quarry on 22 March 1884 but the teams couldn't be separated as the game ended 2–2. However, Kilmarnock edged the replay two weeks later at the same venue to win the Ayrshire Cup for the first time.

There was also success in the Kilmarnock Merchants' Charity Cup as Kilmarnock defeated Hurlford in a third competition after a 5–1 win at Holm Quarry in the final on 31 May 1884.

=== Scottish Cup ===
Date	Round	Opponents	H / A	Result F–A	Scorers	Attendance
8 September 1883	First round	Kilbirnie	w/o			
29 September 1883	Second round	Hurlford	H	3–0		1,000
20 October 1883	Third round	Thornliebank	A	1–2		
3 November 1883	Third round	Thornliebank	A	1–2		

Notes

1. C- A protest from Kilmarnock was upheld and a rematch was ordered.

=== Ayrshire Cup ===
Date	Round	Opponents	H / A	Result F–A	Scorers	Attendance
October 1883	First round	Kilmarnock Portland	w/o			
27 October 1883	Second round	Maybole	A	4–3		
1 December 1883	Third round	Lugar Boswell	A	3–2		
19 January 1884	Semi-final	Kilmarnock Athletic	A	3–1		
22 March 1884	Final	Hurlford	N	2–2		
5 April 1884	Final replay	Hurlford	N	1–0		

=== Kilmarnock Merchants' Charity Cup ===
Date	Round	Opponents	H / A	Result F–A	Scorers	Attendance
May 1884	First round	Bye				
13 May 1884	Semi-final	Annbank	N	4–1		
31 May 1884	Final	Hurlford	N	5–1		

== 1884–85 season ==
Kilmarnock
1884–85 season
- Stadium: Rugby Park
- Scottish Cup: Second round
- Ayrshire Cup: Winners
- Kilmarnock Merchants' Charity Cup: Runners-up
- Ayr Charity Cup: Runners-up
Home colours

Season 1884–85 was the 12th season of competitive football by Kilmarnock.

=== Overview ===
Kilmarnock entered the Scottish Cup for the 12th time and also competed in the Ayrshire Cup, the Kilmarnock Merchants' Charity Cup and - for the first time - the Ayr Charity Cup. In the Scottish Cup, Kilmarnock were involved in a controversial first round tie. Kilmarnock initially defeated Hurlford 6–1 at Drumbiehill Park but a protest over a breach of registration rules was upheld and the result was declared void. The match was replayed and this time Hurlford won 3–1, however a similar protest by Kilmarnock was also upheld and Hurlford were disqualified from the competition. In the second round, Killie lost 4–1 to Annbank at Pebble Park.

A successful Ayrshire Cup campaign started with wins over Monkcastle and Lugar Boswell before Kilmarnock received a bye to the semi-finals. On 31 January 1885, Kilmarnock thumped Ayr 5–2 at Rugby Park to reach the final for the second consecutive season. They retained the cup after defeating Hurlford 2–0 in the final at Holm Quarry.

The two charity cups saw similar fates for Kilmarnock. In the final of the Kilmarnock Merchants' Charity Cup, they lost 3–2 to Ayr at Rugby Park before losing to the same team in the Ayr Charity Cup final.

=== Scottish Cup ===
Date	Round	Opponents	H / A	Result F–A	Scorers	Attendance
20 September 1884	First round	Hurlford	A	6–1		
27 September 1884	First round	Hurlford	A	1–3		
4 October 1884	Second round	Annbank	A	1–4		

Notes

1. E- A protest from Hurlford regarding a breach of registration rules was upheld by the Scottish Football Association and a rematch was ordered. Prior to the kick-off of the rematch, Kilmarnock submitted a similar protest which was subsequently upheld. As a result; both matches were declared void, Hurlford were disqualified and Kilmarnock advanced to the second round.

=== Ayrshire Cup ===
Date	Round	Opponents	H / A	Result F–A	Scorers	Attendance
11 October 1884	First round	Monkcastle	H	4–2		
November 1884	Second round	Lugar Boswell	H	2–1		
December 1884	Third round	Bye				
31 January 1885	Semi-final	Ayr	H	5–2		
28 February 1885	Final	Hurlford	H	2–1		

=== Kilmarnock Merchants' Charity Cup ===
Date	Round	Opponents	H / A	Result F–A	Scorers	Attendance
March 1885	First round	Bye				
April 1885	Semi-final	Bye				
30 May 1885	Final	Ayr	H	2–3		

=== Ayr Charity Cup ===
Date	Round	Opponents	H / A	Result F–A	Scorers	Attendance
21 March 1885	First round	Annbank	N	6–2		
15 May 1885	Semi-final	Mauchline	N	3–1		
6 June 1885	Final	Ayr	N	2–5		

== 1885–86 season ==
Kilmarnock
1885–86 season
- Stadium: Rugby Park
- Scottish Cup: Second round
- Ayrshire Cup: Winners
- Kilmarnock Merchants' Charity Cup: Winners
Home colours

Season 1885–86 was the 13th season of competitive football by Kilmarnock.

=== Overview ===
Kilmarnock entered the Scottish Cup for the 13th time and also competed in the Ayrshire Cup and Kilmarnock Merchants' Charity Cup. In the first round of the Scottish Cup, Kilmarnock easily saw off Annbank with a 7–1 win at Rugby Park. Their second round tie against Hurlford was more of a marathon after one match was declared void, two were drawn and one abandoned before the tie was finally settled six weeks after the original match. Hurlford won through with a 5–1 victory in the fifth match on 14 November 1885.

A third successive Ayrshire Cup triumph began with an 8–1 win over Maybole in the second round after Kilmarnock received a bye in the first round. The third round saw a 7–0 win over Annbank on Boxing Day 1885 following a protested match that Kilmarnock had won 5–0. Lanemark were defeated 3–1 in the semi-finals before Killie retained the trophy with a 2–1 win against Ayr in the final.

The Kilmarnock Merchants' Charity Cup also saw Kilmarnock end with a 100% record after they defeated Kilmarnock Britannia, Kilbirnie and Ayr to lift the cup for the second time in three seasons.

=== Scottish Cup ===
Date	Round	Opponents	H / A	Result F–A	Scorers	Attendance
12 September 1885	First round	Annbank	H	7–1		
3 October 1885	Second round	Hurlford	H	3–4		
17 October 1885	Second round	Hurlford	H	1–1		2,000
31 October 1885	Second round replay	Hurlford	N	1–1		2,000
7 November 1885	Second round replay	Hurlford	A	2–2		2,000
14 November 1885	Second round second replay	Hurlford	H	1–5		

Notes

1. F- A protest from Kilmarnock regarding a breach of registration rules was upheld by the Scottish Football Association and a rematch was ordered.
2. G- Played at Ayr. Match abandoned after 80 minutes.

=== Ayrshire Cup ===
Date	Round	Opponents	H / A	Result F–A	Scorers	Attendance
September 1885	First round	Bye				
21 November 1885	Second round	Maybole	H	8–1		
19 December 1885	Third round	Annbank	A	1–1		
26 December 1885	Third round replay	Annbank	H	7–0		
16 January 1886	Semi-final	Lanemark	H	2–0		
February 1886	Semi-final	Lanemark	H	3–1		
6 March 1886	Final	Ayr	H	2–1		

Notes

1. H- Stopped at half time after Lanemark left the field.

=== Kilmarnock Merchants' Charity Cup ===
Date	Round	Opponents	H / A	Result F–A	Scorers	Attendance
27 February 1886	First round	Kilmarnock Britannia	H	2–0		
3 April 1886	Semi-final	Kilbirnie	H	2–1		
8 May 1886	Final	Ayr	H	5–0		

== 1886–87 season ==
Kilmarnock
1886–87 season
- Stadium: Rugby Park
- Scottish Cup: Quarter-final
- Ayrshire Cup: Second round
- Kilmarnock Merchants' Charity Cup: Runners-up
Home colours

Season 1886–87 was the 14th season of competitive football by Kilmarnock.

=== Overview ===
Kilmarnock entered the Scottish Cup for the 14th time and also competed in the Ayrshire Cup and Kilmarnock Merchants' Charity Cup. In the Scottish Cup, Cumnock scratched the first round tie giving Kilmarnock a walkover victory. A club record 10–2 win was recorded against Lanemark in the second round and this was followed by a 7–2 win against Lugar Boswell in the third round. A bye in the fourth round then saw Kilmarnock defeat Dunblane 6–0 in the fifth round before the journey came to an end in the quarter-finals with a 5–0 loss to Queen's Park.

There was a similar start in the Ayrshire Cup when Girvan scratched from their first round tie. However, Killie's quest for a fourth consecutive Ayrshire Cup win was ended in the second round when they lost 2–1 to Hurlford. They did reach the final of the Kilmarnock Merchants' Charity Cup but it was Ayr who had their name on the trophy after the competition committee decided to play the final second replay at Beresford Park in Ayr, the home of Ayr Parkhouse. Kilmarnock refused to play the match and Ayr were awarded the trophy.

=== Scottish Cup ===
Date	Round	Opponents	H / A	Result F–A	Scorers	Attendance
11 September 1886	First round	Cumnock	w/o			
2 October 1886	Second round	Lanemark	H	10–2		
23 October 1886	Third round	Lugar Boswell	H	7–2		2,000
13 November 1886	Fourth round	Bye				
4 December 1886	Fifth round	Dunblane	H	6–0		2,000
25 December 1886	Quarter-final	Queen's Park	H	0–5		2,500

=== Ayrshire Cup ===
Date	Round	Opponents	H / A	Result F–A	Scorers	Attendance
September 1886	First round	Girvan	w/o			
6 November 1886	Second round	Hurlford	A	1–2		

=== Kilmarnock Merchants' Charity Cup ===
Date	Round	Opponents	H / A	Result F–A	Scorers	Attendance
March 1887	First round	Lugar Boswell	Bye			
9 April 1887	Semi-final	Hurlford	H	5–0		3,000
16 April 1887	Final	Ayr	H	3–3		
23 April 1887	Final replay	Ayr	H	1–1		3,000
May 1887	Final second replay	Ayr	N	–		

Notes

1. I- Ayr were awarded the trophy after Kilmarnock refused to play the second replay at Beresford Park.

== 1887–88 season ==
Kilmarnock
1887–88 season
- Stadium: Rugby Park
- Scottish Cup: Fourth round
- Ayrshire Cup: Third round
- Kilmarnock Merchants' Charity Cup: Runners-up
- Ayr Charity Cup: Winners
Home colours

Season 1887–88 was the 15th season of competitive football by Kilmarnock.

=== Overview ===
Kilmarnock entered the Scottish Cup for the 15th time and also competed in the Ayrshire Cup, Kilmarnock Merchants' Charity Cup and Ayr Charity Cup. The first round of the Scottish Cup saw an 8–2 win against Ayr Thistle at Rugby Park. Kilmarnock received a bye in the second round and In the third round, Killie drew 2–2 against Dykebar before winning the replay 9–1. The fourth round saw Kilmarnock knocked out by Partick Thistle after a replay.

In the first round of the Ayrshire Cup, Kilmarnock set a new record for the club's biggest victory when they defeated Burnfoothill 13–0. It was only the second time the team had scored 10 or more goals in a single game. Maybole – a team who Kilmarnock would also put 13 goals past in the Kilmarnock Merchants' Charity Cup later in the season – were defeated 2–0 in the second round before Kilmarnock's Ayrshire Cup journey was ended by a 2–1 defeat to Kilbirnie at Parkfoot.

There were contrasting fates in the two charity cup competitions despite reaching the final in both. Kilmarnock lifted the Ayr Charity Cup for the first time after thumping Ayr 5–1 but the final of the Kilmarnock Merchants' Charity Cup went unplayed after Kilmarnock refused to play just five days after their semi-final replay victory over Kilmarnock Thistle. As a result, the cup was awarded to Hurlford.

For the first time, Kilmarnock played in vertical stripes however these were black and white rather than the now-traditional blue and white stripes which were first introduced in 1896.

=== Scottish Cup ===
Date	Round	Opponents	H / A	Result F–A	Scorers	Attendance
3 September 1887	First round	Ayr Thistle	H	8–2	Taylor (2), McPherson (2)	
24 September 1887	Second round	Bye				
15 October 1887	Third round	Dykebar	A	2–2	Smith, McGuinness	3,000
22 October 1887	Third round replay	Dykebar	H	9–1	Taylor (2), Higgins (3), McGuinness	
5 November 1887	Fourth round	Partick Thistle	A	2–2	McPherson (2)	4,000
12 November 1887	Fourth round replay	Partick Thistle	H	1–4	McGuinness	5,000

=== Ayrshire Cup ===
Date	Round	Opponents	H / A	Result F–A	Scorers	Attendance
17 September 1887	First round	Burnfoothill	H	13–0		
29 October 1887	Second round	Maybole	A	2–0		
17 December 1887	Third round	Kilbirnie	A	1–2		

=== Kilmarnock Merchants' Charity Cup ===
Date	Round	Opponents	H / A	Result F–A	Scorers	Attendance
24 March 1888	First round	Maybole	H	13–0		
May 1888	Semi-final	Kilmarnock Thistle	A	–		
21 May 1888	Semi-final replay	Kilmarnock Thistle	H	5–1		
26 May 1888	Final	Hurlford	N	–		

Notes

1. J- Kilmarnock refused to play the final just five days after the semi-final replay and the cup was awarded to Hurlford.

=== Ayr Charity Cup ===
Date	Round	Opponents	H / A	Result F–A	Scorers	Attendance
3 March 1888	Semi-final	Hurlford	N	4–0		
31 March 1888	Final	Ayr	N	5–1		

== 1888–89 season ==
Kilmarnock
1888–89 season
- Stadium: Rugby Park
- Scottish Cup: Second round
- Ayrshire Cup: Semi-final
- Kilmarnock Merchants' Charity Cup: Runners-up
- Ayr Charity Cup: Semi-final
- Glasgow Exhibition Cup: First round
Home colours

Season 1888–89 was the 16th season of competitive football by Kilmarnock.

=== Overview ===
Kilmarnock entered the Scottish Cup for the 16th time and also competed in the Ayrshire Cup, Kilmarnock Merchants' Charity Cup, Ayr Charity Cup and Glasgow Exhibition Cup.

In the early-season Glasgow Exhibition Trophy - a one-off tournament held to coincide with the International Exhibition of Science, Art and Industry - Kilmarnock lost their first round tie to Kilbirnie in a replay. It would be the first of four tournaments that Kilbirnie would eliminate Kilmarnock from over the season.

The Scottish Cup was the second of them. After a convincing 5–0 first round win against Lugar Boswell, Killie lost 3–1 at home against Kilbirnie in the second round.

Kilmarnock were involved in a marathon of an Ayrshire Cup campaign which saw them play nine matches before being eliminated in the semi-finals. An 11–1 first round win over Stewarton Cunninghame was followed by a 4–0 win over Mauchline in the second round. After two draws and a protested match, Kilmarnock eventually saw off Irvine in the third round with a 3–0 win at the neutral Somerset Park. The semi-final against Hurlford also reached a second replay after two draws but this time it was Hurlford who would advance with a 3–1 win.

In both charity cup competitions, Kilmarnock were due to play Kilbirnie in the semi-finals. However, after Ayr and Hurlford were disqualified from Kilmarnock Merchants' Charity Cup, the semi-final tie became the final. Kilbirnie won 4–2 to lift the trophy and then, just a week later, they also knocked Kilmarnock out of the Ayr Charity Cup.

=== Scottish Cup ===
Date	Round	Opponents	H / A	Result F–A	Scorers	Attendance
1 September 1888	First round	Lugar Boswell	A	5–0	Lyle, Forbes (2), Russell, Campbell	
22 September 1888	Second round	Kilbirnie	H	1–3	Brodie	5,000

=== Ayrshire Cup ===
Date	Round	Opponents	H / A	Result F–A	Scorers	Attendance
6 October 1888	First round	Stewarton Cunninghame	A	11–1		
27 October 1888	Second round	Mauchline	A	4–0		
17 November 1888	Third round	Irvine	A	2–2		
26 November 1888	Third round replay	Irvine	H	5–1		
1 December 1888	Third round replay	Irvine	H	2–2		
8 December 1888	Third round second replay	Irvine	N	3–0		
15 December 1888	Semi-final	Hurlford	H	3–3		
22 December 1888	Semi-final replay	Hurlford	A	1–1		
12 January 1889	Semi-final second replay	Hurlford	N	1–3		

Notes

1. K- A protest from Irvine was upheld by the Ayrshire Football Association and a rematch was ordered.

=== Kilmarnock Merchants' Charity Cup ===
Date	Round	Opponents	H / A	Result F–A	Scorers	Attendance
2 March 1889	First round	Bye				
30 March 1889	Second round	Maybole	H	4–4		
13 April 1889	Second round replay	Maybole	N	5–1		
April 1889	Semi-final	Kilbirnie		–		
11 May 1889	Final	Kilbirnie	H	2–4		

Notes

1. L- Kilmarnock were due to play Kilbirnie in the semi-final however both teams were given a bye to the final after the other semi-finalists, Ayr and Hurlford were disqualified.

=== Ayr Charity Cup ===
Date	Round	Opponents	H / A	Result F–A	Scorers	Attendance
23 February 1889	First round	Irvine	A	4–1		
20 April 1889	Semi-final	Kilbirnie	H	1–1		
18 May 1889	Semi-final replay	Kilbirnie	A	3–5		

=== Glasgow Exhibition Cup ===
Date	Round	Opponents	H / A	Result F–A	Scorers	Attendance
August 1888	First round	Kilbirnie	H	1–1		
11 August 1888	First round replay	Kilbirnie	A	0–1		

== 1889–90 season ==
Kilmarnock
1889–90 season
- Stadium: Rugby Park
- Scottish Cup: First round
- Ayrshire Cup: First round
- Kilmarnock Merchants' Charity Cup: Semi-final
Home colours

Season 1889–90 was the 17th season of competitive football by Kilmarnock.

=== Overview ===
Kilmarnock entered the Scottish Cup for the 17th time and also competed in the Ayrshire Cup and Kilmarnock Merchants' Charity Cup. In all three competitions, Kilmarnock were eliminated by Annbank in their first match.

=== Scottish Cup ===
Date	Round	Opponents	H / A	Result F–A	Scorers	Attendance
7 September 1889	First round	Annbank	H	2–3	Campbell	4,000

=== Ayrshire Cup ===
Date	Round	Opponents	H / A	Result F–A	Scorers	Attendance
26 October 1889	First round	Annbank	H	1–2		

=== Kilmarnock Merchants' Charity Cup ===
Date	Round	Opponents	H / A	Result F–A	Scorers	Attendance
21 March 1890	First round	Stevenston Thistle	H	9–0		
12 April 1890	Semi-final	Annbank	H	2–5		3,000
