= 1975–76 Scottish Football League =

Scottish football season

Statistics of Scottish Football League in season 1975–76.

== Scottish Premier Division ==
Pos	Team	Pld	W	D	L	GF	GA	GD	Pts	Qualification or relegation
1	Rangers (C)	36	23	8	5	60	24	+36	54	Qualification for the European Cup first round
2	Celtic	36	21	6	9	71	42	+29	48	Qualification for the UEFA Cup first round
3	Hibernian	36	18	7	11	55	43	+12	43	Qualification for the UEFA Cup first round
4	Motherwell	36	16	8	12	57	49	+8	40	
5	Heart of Midlothian	36	13	9	14	39	45	−6	35	Qualification for the Cup Winners' Cup first round
6	Ayr United	36	14	5	17	46	59	−13	33	
7	Aberdeen	36	11	10	15	49	50	−1	32	
8	Dundee United	36	12	8	16	46	48	−2	32	
9	Dundee (R)	36	11	10	15	49	62	−13	32	Relegation to the 1976–77 Scottish First Division
10	St Johnstone (R)	36	3	5	28	29	79	−50	11	Relegation to the 1976–77 Scottish First Division

Source: Statto
Rules for classification: 1) points; 2) goal difference; 3) number of goals scored.
(C) Champions; (R) Relegated

== Scottish First Division ==
Pos	Team	Pld	W	D	L	GF	GA	GD	Pts	Promotion or relegation
1	Partick Thistle (C, P)	26	17	7	2	47	19	+28	41	Promotion to the Premier Division
2	Kilmarnock (P)	26	16	3	7	44	29	+15	35	Promotion to the Premier Division
3	Montrose	26	12	6	8	53	43	+10	30	
4	Dumbarton	26	12	4	10	53	46	+7	28	
5	Arbroath	26	11	4	11	41	39	+2	26	
6	St Mirren	26	9	8	9	37	37	0	26	
7	Falkirk	26	10	5	11	38	35	+3	25	
8	Airdrieonians	26	7	11	8	44	41	+3	25	
9	Hamilton Academical	26	7	10	9	37	37	0	24	
10	Queen of the South	26	9	6	11	44	47	−3	24	
11	Morton	26	7	9	10	31	40	−9	23	
12	East Fife	26	8	7	11	39	53	−14	23	
13	Dunfermline Athletic (R)	26	5	10	11	30	51	−21	20	Relegation to the Second Division
14	Clyde (R)	26	5	4	17	34	52	−18	14	Relegation to the Second Division

Source: RSSSF and statto
Rules for classification: 1) points; 2) goal difference; 3) number of goals scored.
(C) Champions; (P) Promoted; (R) Relegated

== Scottish Second Division ==
Pos	Team	Pld	W	D	L	GF	GA	GD	Pts	Promotion
1	Clydebank (C, P)	26	17	6	3	46	15	+31	40	Promotion to the First Division
2	Raith Rovers (P)	26	15	10	1	45	22	+23	40	Promotion to the First Division
3	Alloa Athletic	26	14	7	5	48	32	+16	35	
4	Queen's Park	26	10	9	7	41	33	+8	29	
5	Cowdenbeath	26	11	7	8	44	43	+1	29	
6	Stirling Albion	26	9	7	10	39	32	+7	25	
7	Stranraer	26	11	3	12	49	43	+6	25	
8	East Stirlingshire	26	8	8	10	33	33	0	24	
9	Albion Rovers	26	7	10	9	35	38	−3	24	
10	Stenhousemuir	26	9	5	12	39	44	−5	23	
11	Berwick Rangers	26	7	5	14	32	44	−12	19	
12	Forfar Athletic	26	4	10	12	28	48	−20	18	
13	Brechin City	26	6	5	15	30	53	−23	17	
14	Meadowbank Thistle	26	5	6	15	24	53	−29	16	

Source: "1975-1976 Second Division - SPFL Archive". SPFL.
Rules for classification: 1) points; 2) goal difference; 3) number of goals scored.
(C) Champions; (P) Promoted

== See also ==
- 1975–76 in Scottish football
