= 1975–76 Scottish First Division =

Scottish First Division
- Season: 1975–76
- Champions: Partick Thistle
- Promoted: Partick Thistle; Kilmarnock
- Relegated: Dunfermline Athletic; Clyde
- Matches played: 182
- Goals scored: 569 (3.13 per match)
- Top goalscorer: John Bourke, John Whiteford (17)
- Biggest home win: Partick Thistle 5–0 East Fife, 15 November 1975
- Biggest away win: Queen of the South 1–7 Airdrieonians, 13 September 1975; East Fife 1–7 Montrose, 7 February 1976

The 1975–76 Scottish First Division season was the first season in which the Scottish First Division became the second tier of Scottish football and the number of teams was reduced from 20 to 14. The season was won by Partick Thistle, who were promoted along with Kilmarnock to the Premier Division. Dunfermline Athletic and Clyde were relegated to the Second Division.

== League table ==
Pos	Team	Pld	W	D	L	GF	GA	GD	Pts	Promotion or relegation
1	Partick Thistle (C, P)	26	17	7	2	47	19	+28	41	Promotion to the Premier Division
2	Kilmarnock (P)	26	16	3	7	44	29	+15	35	Promotion to the Premier Division
3	Montrose	26	12	6	8	53	43	+10	30	
4	Dumbarton	26	12	4	10	53	46	+7	28	
5	Arbroath	26	11	4	11	41	39	+2	26	
6	St Mirren	26	9	8	9	37	37	0	26	
7	Falkirk	26	10	5	11	38	35	+3	25	
8	Airdrieonians	26	7	11	8	44	41	+3	25	
9	Hamilton Academical	26	7	10	9	37	37	0	24	
10	Queen of the South	26	9	6	11	44	47	−3	24	
11	Morton	26	7	9	10	31	40	−9	23	
12	East Fife	26	8	7	11	39	53	−14	23	
13	Dunfermline Athletic (R)	26	5	10	11	30	51	−21	20	Relegation to the Second Division
14	Clyde (R)	26	5	4	17	34	52	−18	14	Relegation to the Second Division

Source: RSSSF and statto
Rules for classification: 1) points; 2) goal difference; 3) number of goals scored.
(C) Champions; (P) Promoted; (R) Relegated
