= Ladywell F.C. =

Association football club in Scotland

Ladywell
- Full name: Ladywell (Maybole) Football Club
- Founded: 1876
- Dissolved: 1880
- Ground: Broomknowes
- Hon. Secretary: John M'Culloch, Andrew Lees
- Match Secretary: John McBride
Home colours

Ladywell F.C. was a football club from Maybole, Ayrshire, active in the 1870s.

== History ==
The club was formed in 1876, two years after the older senior club in the town, Maybole Carrick, and in the aftermath of the end of Maybole Thistle. The football club was formed out of a cricket club which played on Broomknowes and which may have been the factory side of John Gray & Co, whose "immense shoe factory" was called Ladywell.

The first recorded match of the club took place in February 1876, against Girvan Ailsa, although ominously the match was not finished because of a dispute over an Ailsa goal. At the end of the season, Ladywell beat Carrick 2–1 in a friendly at Baltersan, the losers giving three hearty cheers to the victors.

Ladywell's first competitive football came in the first Ayrshire Cup in 1877–78, beating Cumnock in the first round but losing at Beith in the second, the homesters considering the Ladywell to be "a little coarse, and their conduct throughout was extremely childish". Maybole entered in the next two seasons, reaching the third round in 1878–79.

It also entered the Scottish Cup twice. Its first entry, in 1878–79, saw the club reach the second round after beating Tarbolton 3–0. In the second it lost 3–1 at Catrine.

The club reached one stage further in 1879–80. It survived protests after both of its wins. In the first round, Boswell protested that the referee was a member of the Ladywell; the protest was stood over but never revived. In the second round, Stewarton protested that there were no ropes around the pitch; thanks to evidence from the referee that "the spectators had not interfered with the play in the slightest", and the score 6–1 to Ladywell, the protest was easily dismissed.

Having been drawn to face Kilbirnie in the third round, the club first faced the Ardnith club, at Lanemark's ground in the third round of the Ayrshire Cup. Ardnith won 3–2 and the result seems to have dissuaded the Maybole side from continuing, as it scratched to Kilbirnie, and no further matches are recorded for the club; a new club, Maybole, took up the senior cudgels in the town. The Ladywell name was revived for a one-off game in May 1881 and again towards the end of the century.

== Colours ==
The club wore red, yellow, and blue 2" hooped jerseys, with white knickers.

== Ground ==
The club played at Broomknowes, half-a-mile from Maybole railway station.

== Notable players ==
- Adam Dunnachie, who later played for Bolton Wanderers, started his career with Ladywell
