= Ayr Rovers F.C. =

Former association football club in Scotland

Ayr Rovers
- Full name: Ayr Rovers Football Club
- Nickname(s): the Rovers
- Founded: 1885
- Dissolved: 1887
- Ground: Springvale Park
- Secretary: F. G. M'Gregor
Home colours

Ayr Rovers Football Club was an association football club from Ayr, Ayrshire, Scotland.

== History ==
The club was founded in 1885, originally with 30 members, but within a year had grown to 70, which made it nearly as big as Ayr F.C. The club was not related to an earlier Ayr Rovers which played at Robbsland Park and which disbanded in 1881.

Soon after the club's foundation, it joined the Scottish Football Association, and entered the 1885–86 Scottish Cup. Indeed the club's first recorded match was its first round tie with Dalry, which the club scheduled to take place after the Ayr v Maybole tie on the same day had finished, hoping to attract spectators; however the weather militated against people wanting to watch two matches, and Dalry dismantled Rovers to the tune of 8 goals to 0. A mix-up with the wires had the score originally reported as a Rovers win.

The Rovers recovered enough to beat the Stevenson Dynamite in its first Ayrshire Cup tie, albeit in a second replay at Monnkcastle, by 1–0, plus having two goals disallowed. In the second round, the Rovers hosted Ayr, whose players were distracted by a Scottish Cup tie with 3rd Lanarkshire R.V. the following week, and who put in a "wretched" performance, but nevertheless were still good enough to beat the Rovers 2-0.

The club was given a boost at the start of 1886, when it received an invitation to enter the Ayr Charity Cup, after Kilmarnock and Lugar Boswell turned down theirs. The club successfully protested its first round defeat by Annbank on the basis that Barbour had not been registered as an Annbank player for the required 6 weeks. The protest availed the Rovers little as Annbank won the replay at Springvale 5–0.

The club's performances gradually improved in 1886–87; it lost in the Scottish Cup once more to Dalry, although this time only by 5–2, in a tie which aroused next to no media interest. The club's performances in the county cup were more creditable, a walkover and a win over Kilmarnock Athletic putting the club into the quarter-finals, where it faced Hurlford. Hurlford had beaten Kilmarnock in an earlier round, and Kilmarnock had put 7 and 12 past the Rovers in two friendlies that season. Rovers arranged the tie for New Year's Day 1887, which meant Hurlford refused to play as having already arranged a fixture, and Rovers claimed the tie. The Ayrshire FA ordered the tie to be played by the end of January, and the Rovers gained a surprising draw. Hurlford set matters right in the replay, scoring inside 3 minutes, turning around at half-time 5–0 up, and winning 7–0; the man of the match was Rovers' goalkeeper Dunbar, hailed as an "Ayrshire Macaulay".

Nevertheless, the Rovers were on an upward trajectory, winning 5–1 at Monkcastle in the Charity Cup, and beat Clyde in a friendly, shortly after the latter had beaten Ayrshire Cup holders Kilmarnock. The club's final match in the season was a defeat at Kilbirnie in the Charity Cup semi-final, and players competed in athletic sports over the summer.

However the increasing success appears to have proved fatal for the club. By the start of the 1887–88 season, "the majority of the team ha[d] gone over to Ayr", with others to the new Ayr Thistle club, and the club did not renew its membership of the Scottish FA. The club had already entered the Ayrshire Cup and a side was got up to play a tie at Irvine, which ended 6–1 to the home side. The club was definitively defunct by the start of the 1888–89 season, with goalkeeper Dunbar and back Simpson joining up with some former team-mates at the new Ayr Athletic.

== Colours ==
The club wore black and white vertical stripes with white knickers.

== Ground ==
The club's ground was Springvale Park in Midton Road.
