= Maybole F.C. =

Maybole F.C. may refer to:

- Maybole Juniors F.C., association football side currently playing in the West of Scotland League
- Maybole F.C. (1880), former senior football side
- Maybole F.C. (1895), former senior football side

== See also ==
- Maybole Carrick F.C.
