= Ayr Athletic F.C. =

Former association football club in Scotland

Ayr Athletic
- Full name: Ayr Athletic Football Club
- Nickname(s): the Athletic, the Boys
- Founded: 1888
- Dissolved: 1892
- Ground: Athletic Park
- Hon. President: G. White Esq.
- Chairman: Baillie Templeton
- Secretary: James Robertson, Thomas Steen Jr
- Coach: Cox M'Whirter
Home colours

Ayr Athletic Football Club was an association football club from Ayr, Ayrshire, Scotland.

== History ==
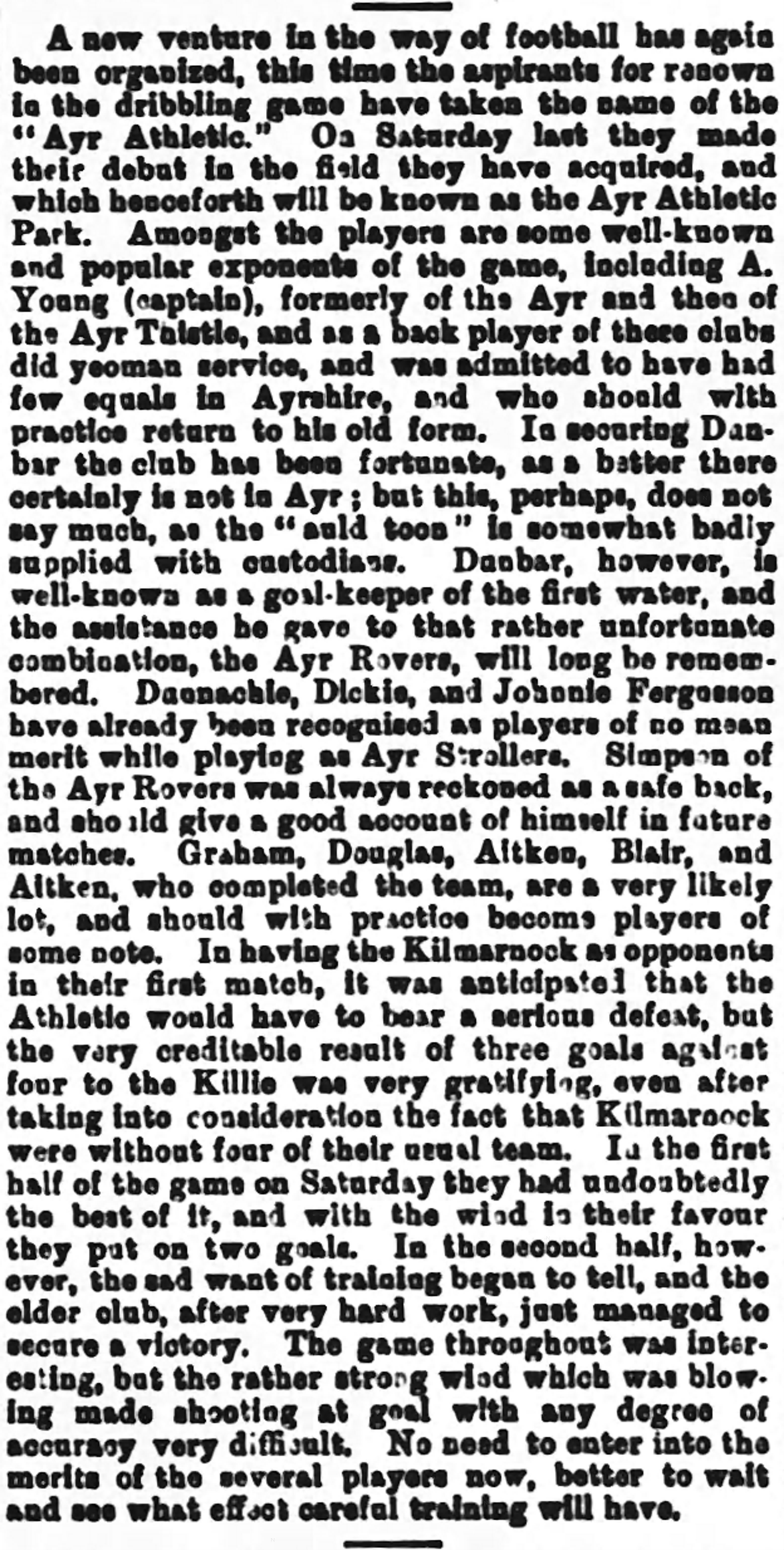
Foundation of Ayr Athletic F.C., Irvine Herald and Cunninghame Advertiser, 6 October 1888

=== Foundation and first season ===
The club was founded at a meeting in the Wallace Town Hall on 12 September 1888, by "two or three discontented ones" from Ayr F.C. This was four months after Ayr had moved "to the other side of the water" from Beresford Park to Somerset Park, and those who preferred to stay in Townhead set up the Athletic.

The Athletic started operations with a 4–3 friendly defeat to Kilmarnock on 29 September 1888. The club had been founded too late to enter the Scottish Cup, but did enter the Ayrshire, and it won its first round tie 5–3 at Galston, brothers Hugh and John Aitken scoring three of the goals.

The club lost 6–3 at home to Lugar Boswell in the second round in a "wretched affair", Athletic conceding all six in the first half, two of which were put down to "the referee with a blindness for which the Lugar team has heartily to thank him". Although the club had split from Ayr, there was still a lot of good feeling for the parent club; the Athletics players hoping "the A.F.C. will win the County cup this year, as there are several much respected and deserving old players worthy to wear the coveted badge", although backing themselves for 1889–90. There was also no enmity at fan level - Ayr's 3–1 win at Lanemark in the third round of the Ayrshire being greeted at Athletic Park "with about as much joy as if it had been a win for the Athletic" - yet the club was a victim of a hoaxer who had claimed that the Athletic was a junior side, therefore unable to play friendlies against senior outfits.

Nevertheless, the club was prominent enough to secure a home friendly with Rangers in February 1889, only losing 2–1, and was invited into the Ayr Charity Cup at the close of the season; after upsetting Annbank in the quarter-final, the club met Ayr for the first time in competitive football in the semi-final. The Athletic taking the lead, but Athletic's centre-forward McMurtrie broke his leg in an awkward tackle at the start of the second half, and the "parent" club romped home 8–2. The incident seems to have soured relations between Ayr and Ayr Athletic; for the 1889–90 season "the senior club will have no dealings with the Townhead club whatever", and even Ayr announcing a friendly with an Ayr Parkhouse club looking to turn senior "raised a lot of bad feeling".

=== National competition ===
The club duly joined the Scottish Football Association in August 1889, in effect replacing the defunct Ayr Thistle, and was able to enter the 1889–90 Scottish Cup. Its debut match in the competition, at Maybole, was a scarcely believable 6–6 draw, the Athletic coming from 4–2 behind at half-time, and goalkeeper Dunbar being blamed for "glaring" mistakes. Dunbar redeemed himself in the replay, in which Maybole equalized a first-half goal with ten minutes remaining, but Athletic scored two late goals to win through 3–1. A bye took the club into the third round, and, with a weekend spare, the club had generated enough of a reputation to be invited to play in Ireland in lieu of a second round Cup tie, losing 4–3 at Distillery.

The third round tie at Lanemark was an emotional affair for the home side, whose captain John Reynolds had been killed in a mining explosion shortly before the game, leading to Lanemark asking (in vain) for a postponement. The Athletic took an early lead, but the Lannies had made it 4–1 with 10 minutes to go; the Athletic scored two late goals to come close to earning a replay. Based on "hearsay" that the Lannies were fielding William Graham from Preston North End, and had therefore deployed a banned professional, Athletic put in a protest, but it was dismissed as the "W. Graham" concerned proved to be a different player.

The club however had peaked; by the time it beat Lugar Boswell in the second round of the 1889–90 Ayrshire Cup, the club had lost four regular players to England, and Ayr's unexpected Scottish Cup win over Morton had reinvigorated the older club. The club was not expected to have any difficulty in beating the 1st Ayrshire Rifle Volunteers of Dalry in the quarter-final of the Ayrshire, but the Athletic put up a "poor exhibition" and went down 2–1. The Ayrshire Post blamed the referee, former Hurlford player Neil Craig, for giving 30 fouls against the Athletic compared to 4 against the Dalry side, and failing to spot a good goal for the homesters; the victors asserted that the Athletic's Gavin was lucky not to be ordered off, and that Mr Craig acted with "perfect impartiality."

Gavin was indeed suspended for a month in the aftermath, and the Athletic sanctioned for not protecting Mr Craig sufficiently from the anger of the crowd. The club was never a force again. Towards the end of the 1889–90 season, the club lost in the first round of the Ayr Charity Cup to Kilbirnie at Somerset Park, the game ending 10 minutes early when an angry crowd invaded the pitch; the Athletic protest that the tie should be replayed, as the club was not responsible for the crowd, which would not have been so riled "had the referee not been so biased against us", was defeated 4 to 3.

=== Loss of ground ===
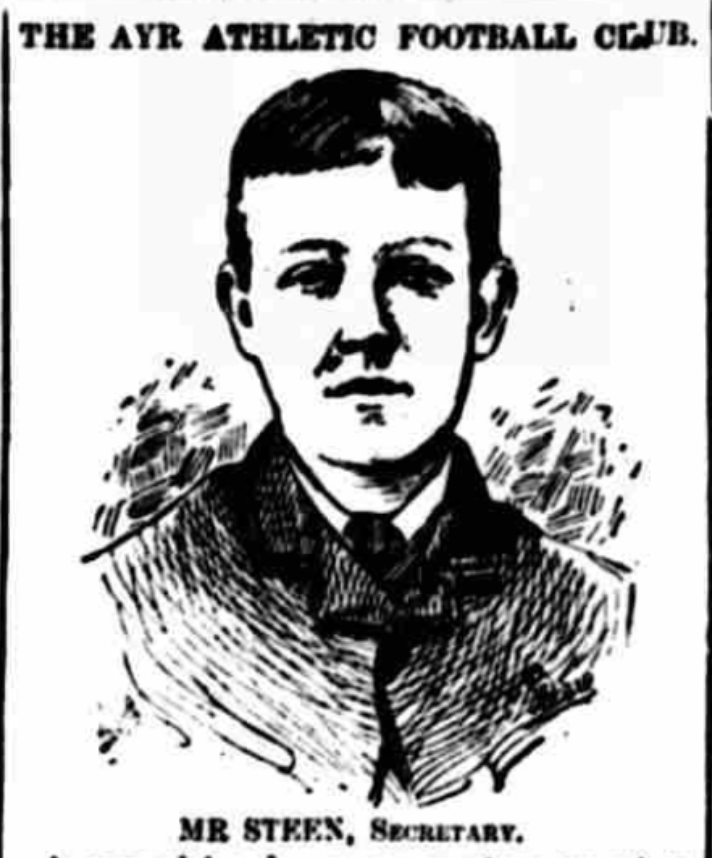
Thomas Steen Jr, Ayr Athletic F.C. secretary, Ayrshire Post, 11 September 1891

Ayr Parkhouse joined the Scottish Football Association in 1890, which meant the town now had three senior clubs. Parkhouse seized the initiative by renting the Athletic ground without the Athletic's knowledge, and, blindsided by the move and stalled while finding a new ground, the Athletic was eclipsed. The financial cost to the club was £270, which led to later financial difficulties. The club had also not been able to practise over the summer, and started the 1890–91 season with a record defeat - 13–1 at Newmilns. Athletic lost in both the first round of the Scottish Cup (7–2 at Morton) and Ayrshire Cup (5–2 at Mauchline). The defeat at Mauchline caused a rupture in the club as it turned up at Mauchline short-handed, the club's conveyance having left before the due time and leaving three players behind; this appears to have driven some player away, and a return friendly with Mauchline had to be restricted to an hour because the Athletic could not get a full side together.

Worse was to follow in the Charity Cup, as the Athletic was not even invited to compete. The Charity Committee ordered Athletic to play a trial game with Parkhouse at the latter's Beresford Park, and Athletic refused to play, given there were neutral venues available, even though Beresford Park was the former Athletic Park; Parkhouse took the Charity Cup entry by default. Athletic did get to play Parkhouse in a competition to raise funds for the Ayr Swimming Club, at Somerset Park, but the result - 8–1 to the Parkies - justified the Charity Committee's decision.

Professionalism and more established clubs in the game made it harder for newer and smaller clubs to compete; the Athletic suffered, like many others, by not being able to hold onto players, as "there was always someone who tried to wile him away, and unfortunately too often succeeded". The situation was exacerbated by the cost of a new ground, the support falling off to "meagre" levels, and, crucially, missing out on the chance of being a member of the Ayrshire Football League, as the Ayr representative for the initial competition in 1891–92 was Parkhouse. The club did apply to join the Scottish Football Federation instead, as that nascent competition had a vacancy after King's Park switched allegiance to the Scottish Football Alliance, but it was only one of ten clubs applying for one vacancy, and it missed out to Clydebank.

=== Final season ===
There were rumours that the club would not survive into 1891–92, but, despite losing Fullarton, Kelly, and Logan on the eve of the season to play for Ayr Strollers, the club did manage to play through the season. It came from behind to win its first preliminary round tie in the Scottish Cup against Cathcart 3–1, helped by the opposition losing four players due to work commitments, but the Athletic being so denuded that even club secretary Steen - who had only rarely played for the reserves - made an unexpected first team debut. Perhaps indicating the club's financial straits, not every player wore an identical jersey in the tie; this led to a protest from Cathcart, but, as there was no clash with Cathcart's dark blue, the protest was dismissed. Athletic went out in a second round replay to Kilbarchan, having only conceded a late equalizer in the first game.

The game was the club's last throw of the dice, as it thereafter lost key players Hunter, Mair, Allan, and Peebles, lost its next match 14–0 at Kilbirnie, was ordered to pay £6 to the Moffat club to redeem a guarantee for a fixture, and, in the first round of the Ayrshire, lost 11–2 at Lugar Boswell, having turned up without a goalkeeper or right-back, pressing the club's linesman and a fan into service.

The club changed its colours in 1892 to those of the Adventurers club in Edinburgh, but it is unclear whether the club ever got to wear them - it was barred from playing its Scottish Cup tie with Monkcastle because the debt to Moffat was still outstanding, and, when scheduled to play Ayr Parkhouse in the Ayrshire Cup, nobody knew if the club still existed. Its failure to turn up suggested the answer was in the negative. In November 1892 the faithful Steen, who had been with the club from its start, offered the club's grandstand, barricade, and club-house for sale to "contractors, joiners, &c.", presumably for breaking up. By the 1895 Ordnance Survey, there was no trace left of the ground.

== Colours ==
The club wore gold and chocolate vertically striped shirts with black knickers. In 1892 it registered dark blue, light blue, and white vertical striped shirts, although the club does not seem to have played in the 1892–93 season.

== Ground ==
The Athletic's original plan was to play at Ayr Racecourse, but the club instead took over the Cattle Market ground, which had been the ground of Ayr Thistle, and which the club re-christened Athletic Park. In August 1889, the ground was made into a public show ground "to Athletic surprise and annoyance", which compromised the club's resources. Worse was to follow in April 1890, when the club sought to renew its lease with the railway company landlord, to be told that Parkhouse had already agreed to lease it.

In September 1890, therefore, the club moved to a new ground, which it also called Athletic Park, on Dalmellington Road. The ground was said to be in "a splendid situation" and the pitch "almost dead level", and the first match there was a 4–2 win over a strong Battlefield side on 27 September.

== Notable players ==
- James Hunter, half-back, winner of the Ayrshire Charity Cup with Ayr, who joined the Athletic in 1890

== Nickname ==
The club was nicknamed "the Boys", after taking a particularly young side to Maybole for a friendly in December 1888.
