= Rankinston F.C. =

Association football club in Scotland

Rankinston
- Full name: Rankinston F.C.
- Nickname(s): the Mountaineers
- Founded: 1876
- Dissolved: 1883
- Ground: Littlemills
- Match Secretary: Hugh Reynolds, Irvin Clifford
Home colours

Rankinston Football Club was an association football club from the village of Rankinston, Ayrshire.

== History ==
The club was founded as Rankinston Mountaineers in 1876. Apart from a one-off reference in a friendly against Coylton Coila in 1880, its last recorded match under its full name was against Mauchline in February 1878, and the club was formally registered as Rankinston, although the media occasionally used the Rankinstone spelling.

It was never a large club; its highest membership, in its last season of 1882–83, was a mere 35. It was also never very active, only playing 10 matches in its last season before turning senior, and 9 in its first senior season.

Nevertheless, it was one of the inaugural entrants to the Ayrshire Cup in 1877–78, and it won through to the third round on three occasions, its best performance in 1879–80 seeing it only lose narrowly at Kilmarnock Athletic at that stage.

Perhaps encouraged by that the club turned senior and entered the 1880–81 Scottish Cup. It entered the national competition three times, and every time was drawn against Maybole in the first round. The first tie between the sides in 1880–81 was a brutal one, Maybole allegedly audibly deciding to play the man rather than the ball, only for Rankinston to retaliate to greater effect, reducing Maybole to 10 men, and winning 1–0, two further goals "disallowed by the referee from Maybole". Maybole however protested successfully against the lack of ropes and the Mountaineers' rough play, and the Scottish FA ordered a replay with a neutral referee. The replay took place at Springvale Park, the home of Ayr F.C., and Maybole scored a "decisive" 3–1 victory. Rankinston had a change of approach in the aftermath - its thrilling 5–5 draw with Hurlford in the Ayrshire Cup later in October was "one of the best ever played in Rankinston" and "of a friendly nature all through".

Its remaining Scottish Cup entries however were ignominious. In 1881–82 Maybole won 7–0 and in 1882–83 Rankinston simply scratched.

The club's last run in the Ayrshire Cup, in 1882–83, came to an unfortunate end; drawn at Largs Athletic in the quarter-final, the club's players missed the train, and the club had to scratch. The club's formal end came when it was struck off the Scottish FA's roll in August 1883. The name was revived for a Junior club in 1890.

== Colours ==
The club wore black and white jerseys and hose.

== Ground ==
The club's ground, Littlemills, was 2½ miles from Drongan railway station.
