= 1975–76 in Scottish football =

Premier Division champions
- Rangers

First Division champions
- Partick Thistle

Second Division champions
- Clydebank

Scottish Cup winners
- Rangers

League Cup winners
- Rangers

Spring Cup winners
- Airdrieonians

Junior Cup winners
- Bo'ness United

Teams in Europe
- Celtic, Dundee United, Hibernian, Rangers

Scotland national team
- 1976 BHC, UEFA Euro 1976 qualifying
- ← 1974–75 1976–77 →

The 1975–76 season was the 103rd season of competitive football in Scotland and the 79th season of Scottish league football. It was the first season in the new, three-tier setup.

The Premier Division champions succeeded the last Division One champions, and the new First Division champions were equivalent to the old Division Two champions. The new Second Division was a completely new competition.

Both the First and Second Divisions now contained 14 teams, previously considered a difficult number to ensure a balanced schedule. A 26-game programme, with every team playing each other home and away, was considered too short, a 52-game programme (with each team playing each other home and away twice) too congested. A 39-game schedule would leave an imbalance with each side having two fixtures at home against some teams, and one against others. The Scottish Football League addressed the problem by opting for a 26-game calendar and introducing a supplementary competition, the Spring Cup, open only to teams from the First and Second Divisions, to be played at the season's end. It was discontinued after a single season.

== Scottish Premier Division ==
Pos	Team	Pld	W	D	L	GF	GA	GD	Pts	Qualification or relegation
1	Rangers (C)	36	23	8	5	60	24	+36	54	Qualification for the European Cup first round
2	Celtic	36	21	6	9	71	42	+29	48	Qualification for the UEFA Cup first round
3	Hibernian	36	18	7	11	55	43	+12	43	Qualification for the UEFA Cup first round
4	Motherwell	36	16	8	12	57	49	+8	40	
5	Heart of Midlothian	36	13	9	14	39	45	−6	35	Qualification for the Cup Winners' Cup first round
6	Ayr United	36	14	5	17	46	59	−13	33	
7	Aberdeen	36	11	10	15	49	50	−1	32	
8	Dundee United	36	12	8	16	46	48	−2	32	
9	Dundee (R)	36	11	10	15	49	62	−13	32	Relegation to the 1976–77 Scottish First Division
10	St Johnstone (R)	36	3	5	28	29	79	−50	11	Relegation to the 1976–77 Scottish First Division

Source: Statto
Rules for classification: 1) points; 2) goal difference; 3) number of goals scored.
(C) Champions; (R) Relegated

Champions: Rangers
Relegated: Dundee, St Johnstone

== Scottish League First Division ==
Pos	Team	Pld	W	D	L	GF	GA	GD	Pts	Promotion or relegation
1	Partick Thistle (C, P)	26	17	7	2	47	19	+28	41	Promotion to the Premier Division
2	Kilmarnock (P)	26	16	3	7	44	29	+15	35	Promotion to the Premier Division
3	Montrose	26	12	6	8	53	43	+10	30	
4	Dumbarton	26	12	4	10	53	46	+7	28	
5	Arbroath	26	11	4	11	41	39	+2	26	
6	St Mirren	26	9	8	9	37	37	0	26	
7	Falkirk	26	10	5	11	38	35	+3	25	
8	Airdrieonians	26	7	11	8	44	41	+3	25	
9	Hamilton Academical	26	7	10	9	37	37	0	24	
10	Queen of the South	26	9	6	11	44	47	−3	24	
11	Morton	26	7	9	10	31	40	−9	23	
12	East Fife	26	8	7	11	39	53	−14	23	
13	Dunfermline Athletic (R)	26	5	10	11	30	51	−21	20	Relegation to the Second Division
14	Clyde (R)	26	5	4	17	34	52	−18	14	Relegation to the Second Division

Source: RSSSF and statto
Rules for classification: 1) points; 2) goal difference; 3) number of goals scored.
(C) Champions; (P) Promoted; (R) Relegated

Promoted: Partick Thistle, Kilmarnock
Relegated: Dunfermline Athletic, Clyde

== Scottish League Second Division ==
Pos	Team	Pld	W	D	L	GF	GA	GD	Pts	Promotion
1	Clydebank (C, P)	26	17	6	3	46	15	+31	40	Promotion to the First Division
2	Raith Rovers (P)	26	15	10	1	45	22	+23	40	Promotion to the First Division
3	Alloa Athletic	26	14	7	5	48	32	+16	35	
4	Queen's Park	26	10	9	7	41	33	+8	29	
5	Cowdenbeath	26	11	7	8	44	43	+1	29	
6	Stirling Albion	26	9	7	10	39	32	+7	25	
7	Stranraer	26	11	3	12	49	43	+6	25	
8	East Stirlingshire	26	8	8	10	33	33	0	24	
9	Albion Rovers	26	7	10	9	35	38	−3	24	
10	Stenhousemuir	26	9	5	12	39	44	−5	23	
11	Berwick Rangers	26	7	5	14	32	44	−12	19	
12	Forfar Athletic	26	4	10	12	28	48	−20	18	
13	Brechin City	26	6	5	15	30	53	−23	17	
14	Meadowbank Thistle	26	5	6	15	24	53	−29	16	

Source: "1975-1976 Second Division - SPFL Archive". SPFL.
Rules for classification: 1) points; 2) goal difference; 3) number of goals scored.
(C) Champions; (P) Promoted

Promoted: Clydebank, Raith Rovers

== Cup honours ==
Competition	Winner	Score	Runner-up
Scottish Cup 1975–76	Rangers	3 – 1	Heart of Midlothian
League Cup 1975–76	Rangers	1 – 0	Celtic
Spring Cup	Airdrieonians	4 – 2 (a.e.t.)	Clydebank
Junior Cup	Bo'ness United	3 – 0	Darvel Juniors

== Other honours ==
=== National ===
Competition	Winner	Score	Runner-up
Scottish Qualifying Cup – North	Elgin City	3 – 1 *	Inverness Thistle
Scottish Qualifying Cup – South	Vale of Leithen	5 – 2 *	Girvan

=== County ===
Competition	Winner	Score	Runner-up
Aberdeenshire Cup	Fraserburgh	3-1	Huntly
Ayrshire Cup	Ayr United	4 – 0 *	Kilmarnock
East of Scotland Shield	Hearts	8 – 0	Meadowbank Thistle
Fife Cup	Raith Rovers	3 – 2 *	East Fife
Forfarshire Cup	Dundee United	3 – 1	Dundee
Glasgow Cup	Rangers	3 – 1	Celtic
Lanarkshire Cup	Airdrie		
Stirlingshire Cup	Stenhousemuir	1 – 0	East Stirling

^{*} – aggregate over two legs

=== Highland League ===
Top Three
Pos	Team	Pld	W	D	L	GF	GA	GD	Pts
1	Nairn County	30	19	6	5	75	35	+40	44
2	Fraserburgh	30	20	4	6	67	35	+32	44
3	Keith	30	19	5	6	65	30	+35	43

== Individual honours ==
Award	Winner	Club
Footballer of the Year	(Scotland) John Greig	Rangers

== Scotland national team ==
Date	Venue	Opponents	Score	Competition	Scotland scorer(s)
3 September	Idraetsparken, Copenhagen (A)	Denmark	1–0	ECQG4	Joe Harper
29 October	Hampden Park, Glasgow (H)	Denmark	3–1	ECQG4	Kenny Dalglish, Bruce Rioch, Ted MacDougall
17 December	Hampden Park, Glasgow (H)	Romania	1–1	ECQG4	Bruce Rioch
7 April	Hampden Park, Glasgow (H)	Switzerland	1–0	friendly	Willie Pettigrew
6 May	Hampden Park, Glasgow (H)	Wales	3–1	BHC	Willie Pettigrew, Bruce Rioch, Eddie Gray
8 May	Hampden Park, Glasgow (H)	Northern Ireland	3–0	BHC	Archie Gemmill, Kenny Dalglish, Don Masson
15 May	Hampden Park, Glasgow (H)	England	2–1	BHC	Don Masson, Kenny Dalglish

1976 British Home Championship – Winners

Key:

- (H) = Home match
- (A) = Away match
- ECQG4 = European Championship qualifying – Group 4
- BHC = British Home Championship
