= Hugh McLean =

Hugh McLean may refer to:

- Hubert McLean (1907–1997), New Zealand rugby union player, known as Hugh McLean
- Hugh Havelock McLean (1854–1938), Canadian soldier, politician and Lieutenant Governor of New Brunswick
- Hugh McLean (cricketer) (1864–1915), Australian cricketer
- Hugh McLean (Slavicist) (1925–2017), Slavic literature scholar
- Hugh McLean (organist) (1930–2017), Canadian organist
- Hugh McLean (footballer) (born 1952), Scottish footballer
