= Catrine F.C. =

Former association football club in Scotland

Catrine
- Full name: Catrine Football Club
- Founded: 1877
- Dissolved: 1881
- Ground: Burn Park
- Hon. Secretary: James Dale
Home colours

Catrine Football Club was a Scottish association football club based in the village of Catrine, Ayrshire.

== History ==
The club was founded in 1877. Within a season it could claim to be one of the largest sides in Ayrshire, with 90 members, which was more than Kilmarnock, and only beaten by Kilmarnock Athletic, neighbours Mauchline, both by small margins, and the mammoth Portland which had twice as many members as any other club in the shire.

Catrine entered both the Scottish Cup and the Ayrshire Cup in its first season. It lost in the first round of the former to Beith, conceding from an early corner but dominating the game without equalizing. Catrine beat Maybole Carrick 2–1 in the latter, despite having to play against a wind that rose up against it in the second half, going out to Mauchline 2–0 at the last 6 stage.

Its only win in the Scottish Cup came in 1878–79; following a bye in the first round, Catrine beat Maybole Ladywell 3–1 in the second. In the third, the club was unlucky to be drawn against the Portland - the other three Ayrshire sides still in the competition were drawn against clubs from other districts, and all won with ease - and went out 3–0 in an "excellent" match, the opening goal being an unusual one as it was palmed into his own goal by a Catrine defender, but Portland did not claim "hands" so the goal was given.

In 1879–80 Catrine had its best run in the Ayrshire Cup. A mammoth first round tie against Cronberry Eglinton went to three replays; the requirement for so many replays was put down to a referee in the tie who was "unfair, unsatisfactory, and one-sided", as Catrine had twice had goals disallowed in the matches ties, including one which "passed the posts fully half a yard before it was returned" but which the referee refused as not having crossed the line. With a new official who "gave entire satisfaction" Catrine went nap. It then beat the Afton Lads 8–1 and Saltcoats Crescent in a replay to reach the quarter-final. At that stage it was drawn at home to favourites Kilbirnie, but nearly pulled off a shock result, going 3–2 up in the second half, and continuing on the attack rather than trying to hold on for the win, which allowed Kilbirnie to score a late equalizer. Kilbirnie won the replay 4–0, despite Catrine's "manly" game, Catrine being unlucky when a Forsyth free-kick went straight between the posts without anyone getting a touch on it; at the time the laws of the game made all free-kicks indirect.

Catrine remained a village club, and by 1880 only had 60 members, while nearby Mauchline had 150. In the face of larger competition, the club seems to have given up during the 1880–81 season, due in part to the problem of keeping up membership when struggling with "many removals from our village to better spheres of labour". It did enter the 1881–82 Scottish Cup and was drawn away at Kilbirnie, but the club had dissolved before the tie was due to be played.

== Colours ==
The club started playing in white jerseys, white knickers with a black stripe, and black and white hose, but after one season changed to scarlet (later red) jerseys, white knickers, and blue hose, which remained the club's colours till its dissolution.

== Ground ==
The club's first ground was Burn Park, 2 1/2 miles from Mauchline railway station. From 1880 the club played at Alexander Park, although this may have been a re-named Burn Park.
