= Spring Cup =

Scottish football tournament

- Sport: Football
- Founded: 1976
- No. of teams: 28
- Country: Scotland
- Most recent champion: Airdrieonians

The Spring Cup was a Scottish football tournament played in 1976. It was introduced for members of Division One and Two of the Scottish Football League in the wake of league reconstruction in 1975, to be played after the conclusion of all the league fixtures at the end of the 1975–76 season. It derived its title from the season (spring) it was played in.

== League reconstruction and foundation ==
When Scottish Football League member clubs voted in favour reconstruction in the summer of 1974, the format they approved was a three division structure of 10, 14 and 14 teams respectively, to be introduced at the beginning of the 1975–76 season. The new Divisions One and Two would now contain 14 teams, previously considered a difficult number for creating a balanced schedule. A 26-game programme (with every team playing each other home and away) was considered too short, a 52-game programme (with each team playing each other home and away twice) too congested. A 39-game schedule would leave an imbalance with sides having two fixtures at home against some teams, and one against others. The solution the Scottish Football League opted for was a 26-game calendar augmented by a supplementary cup competition, the "Spring Cup". The tournament, to be played at the season's end, was open only to teams from Divisions One and Two.

== Format ==
The 28 Division One and Two clubs were divided into seven groups of 4 teams. These sides would play each other home and away, with two points awarded for a win and one for a draw, the top two sides in the group qualifying for the second round. In addition, the two third-placed sides with the best record would also qualify. The second round and quarter-finals were played on a two-leg, home and away basis, while the semi-finals and final were to be played at neutral venues.

== 1975–76 Spring Cup ==
Division One Airdrieonians won the competition, defeating Division Two Clydebank in the final. They had qualified from a group containing Brechin City, East Fife and Stranraer. In the second round they eliminated Dunfermline Athletic 5–4 on aggregate, while in the quarter-finals they beat Hamilton Academical. In the semi-final, a strike from Cairney and two own goals helped them defeat Morton 3–1 at Love Street.

=== First round ===
==== Group 1 ====
Team	Pld	W	D	L	GF	GA	GD	Pts
Airdrieonians	6	4	1	1	11	7	+3	9
East Fife	6	3	1	2	10	5	+5	7
Brechin City	6	1	3	2	9	8	+1	5
Stranraer	6	1	1	4	7	17	-10	3

Home team	Score	Away team	Date
Airdrieonians	2–1	Brechin City	6 March 1976
Stranraer	1–0	East Fife	6 March 1976
Brechin City	4–0	Stranraer	13 March 1976
East Fife	3–0	Airdrieonians	13 March 1976
East Fife	2–0	Brechin City	20 March 1976
Stranraer	0–1	Airdrieonians	20 March 1976
Airdrieonians	1–0	East Fife	27 March 1976
Stranraer	2–2	Brechin City	27 March 1976
Brechin City	1–1	Airdrieonians	3 April 1976
East Fife	4–2	Stranraer	3 April 1976
Airdrieonians	6–2	Stranraer	10 April 1976
Brechin City	1–1	East Fife	10 April 1976

==== Group 2 ====
Team	Pld	W	D	L	GF	GA	GD	Pts
Falkirk	6	4	1	1	10	5	+5	9
Alloa Athletic	6	2	3	1	10	8	+2	7
Kilmarnock	6	1	3	2	5	6	-1	5
Berwick Rangers	6	0	3	3	4	10	-6	3

Home team	Score	Away team	Date
Alloa Athletic	3–1	Falkirk	6 March 1976
Berwick Rangers	0–0	Kilmarnock	10 March 1976
Falkirk	2–0	Berwick Rangers	13 March 1976
Kilmarnock	0–0	Alloa Athletic	13 March 1976
Berwick Rangers	2–2	Alloa Athletic	20 March 1976
Kilmarnock	0–1	Falkirk	20 March 1976
Alloa Athletic	2–2	Kilmarnock	27 March 1976
Berwick Rangers	1–1	Falkirk	27 March 1976
Falkirk	3–1	Alloa Athletic	3 April 1976
Kilmarnock	3–1	Berwick Rangers	3 April 1976
Alloa Athletic	2–0	Berwick Rangers	10 April 1976
Falkirk	2–0	Kilmarnock	10 April 1976

==== Group 3 ====
Team	Pld	W	D	L	GF	GA	GD	Pts
St Mirren	6	5	0	1	18	2	+16	10
Partick Thistle	6	4	0	2	14	5	+9	8
Meadowbank Thistle	6	2	1	3	6	17	-11	5
Forfar Athletic	6	0	1	5	5	15	-10	1

Home team	Score	Away team	Date
Forfar Athletic	0–1	Partick Thistle	6 March 1976
Meadowbank Thistle	0–4	St Mirren	6 March 1976
Partick Thistle	5–0	Meadowbank Thistle	13 March 1976
St Mirren	5–0	Forfar Athletic	13 March 1976
Forfar Athletic	3–3	Meadowbank Thistle	20 March 1976
St Mirren	1–2	Partick Thistle	20 March 1976
Forfar Athletic	0–1	St Mirren	27 March 1976
Meadowbank Thistle	2–1	Partick Thistle	27 March 1976
Partick Thistle	4–2	Forfar Athletic	3 April 1976
St Mirren	4–0	Meadowbank Thistle	3 April 1976
Meadowbank Thistle	1–0	Forfar Athletic	10 April 1976
Partick Thistle	1–3	St Mirren	10 April 1976

==== Group 4 ====
Team	Pld	W	D	L	GF	GA	GD	Pts
Dumbarton	6	4	0	2	12	7	+5	8
Arbroath	6	3	0	3	8	6	+2	6
Albion Rovers	6	3	0	3	9	10	-1	6
Stenhousemuir	6	2	0	4	6	10	-4	4

Home team	Score	Away team	Date
Stenhousemuir	0–2	Arbroath	6 March 1976
Dumbarton	4–1	Albion Rovers	10 March 1976
Albion Rovers	1–0	Stenhousemuir	13 March 1976
Arbroath	0–1	Dumbarton	13 March 1976
Albion Rovers	1–0	Arbroath	20 March 1976
Stenhousemuir	2–1	Dumbarton	20 March 1976
Dumbarton	1–2	Arbroath	27 March 1976
Stenhousemuir	2–3	Albion Rovers	27 March 1976
Arbroath	0–1	Stenhousemuir	3 April 1976
Albion Rovers	1–2	Dumbarton	7 April 1976
Arbroath	3–2	Albion Rovers	10 April 1976
Dumbarton	3–1	Stenhousemuir	10 April 1976

==== Group 5 ====
Team	Pld	W	D	L	GF	GA	GD	Pts
Queen's Park	6	2	3	1	9	6	+3	7
Dunfermline Athletic	6	3	1	2	7	8	-1	7
Hamilton Academical	6	2	2	2	5	8	-3	6
Cowdenbeath	6	2	0	4	8	7	+1	4

Home team	Score	Away team	Date
Cowdenbeath	3–0	Hamilton Academical	6 March 1976
Queen's Park	1–1	Dunfermline Athletic	6 March 1976
Dunfermline Athletic	1–0	Cowdenbeath	13 March 1976
Hamilton Academical	1–1	Queen's Park	13 March 1976
Dunfermline Athletic	1–2	Hamilton Academical	20 March 1976
Queen's Park	2–0	Cowdenbeath	20 March 1976
Cowdenbeath	4–0	Dunfermline Athletic	27 March 1976
Queen's Park	1–1	Hamilton Academical	27 March 1976
Dunfermline Athletic	2–1	Queen's Park	3 April 1976
Hamilton Academical	1–0	Cowdenbeath	6 April 1976
Cowdenbeath	1–3	Queen's Park	10 April 1976
Hamilton Academical	0–2	Dunfermline Athletic	10 April 1976

==== Group 6 ====
Team	Pld	W	D	L	GF	GA	GD	Pts
Raith Rovers	6	4	1	1	12	9	+3	9
Clydebank	6	4	0	1	15	6	+9	8
Clyde	6	2	1	3	7	11	-4	5
Queen of the South	6	1	0	5	6	14	-8	2

Home team	Score	Away team	Date
Clyde	1–3	Clydebank	6 March 1976
Raith Rovers	4–2	Queen of the South	10 March 1976
Clydebank	1–2	Raith Rovers	13 March 1976
Queen of the South	1–2	Clyde	13 March 1976
Clyde	2–2	Raith Rovers	20 March 1976
Clydebank	4–0	Queen of the South	20 March 1976
Queen of the South	1–3	Clydebank	27 March 1976
Raith Rovers	2–1	Clyde	27 March 1976
Clydebank	3–0	Clyde	3 April 1976
Queen of the South	2–0	Raith Rovers	3 April 1976
Clyde	1–0	Queen of the South	10 April 1976
Raith Rovers	2–1	Clydebank	10 April 1976

==== Group 7 ====
Team	Pld	W	D	L	GF	GA	GD	Pts
Montrose	6	4	1	1	15	11	+4	9
Morton	6	4	1	1	11	7	+4	9
East Stirlingshire	6	1	2	4	4	8	-4	4
Stirling Albion	6	0	2	4	6	10	-4	2

Home team	Score	Away team	Date
East Stirlingshire	1–2	Morton	6 March 1976
Morton	2–4	Montrose	13 March 1976
Stirling Albion	0–0	East Stirlingshire	13 March 1976
Montrose	3–0	East Stirlingshire	20 March 1976
Stirling Albion	0–1	Morton	20 March 1976
East Stirlingshire	2–1	Stirling Albion	27 March 1976
Montrose	1–4	Morton	27 March 1976
Montrose	3–2	Stirling Albion	31 March 1976
Stirling Albion	2–3	Montrose	3 April 1976
Morton	1–0	East Stirlingshire	7 April 1976
East Stirlingshire	1–1	Montrose	10 April 1976
Morton	1–1	Stirling Albion	10 April 1976

=== Second Rounds ===
==== First leg ====
Home team	Score	Away team	Date
Arbroath	2–1	Falkirk	14 April 1976
Clydebank	4–1	Albion Rovers	14 April 1976
Dunfermline Athletic	4–2	Airdrieonians	14 April 1976
Montrose	3–1	Hamilton Academical	14 April 1976
Morton	1–1	Queen's Park	14 April 1976
Partick Thistle	1–0	East Fife	14 April 1976
St Mirren	3–0	Alloa Athletic	14 April 1976
Raith Rovers	2–2	Dumbarton	17 April 1976

==== Second leg ====
Home team	Score	Away team	Date	Agg
Airdrieonians	3–0	Dunfermline Athletic	17 April 1976	5–4
Albion Rovers	2–0	Clydebank	17 April 1976	3–4
Alloa Athletic	1–4	St Mirren	17 April 1976	1–7
East Fife	2–0	Partick Thistle	17 April 1976	2–1
Falkirk	2–0	Arbroath	17 April 1976	3–2
Hamilton Academical	6–3	Montrose	17 April 1976	7–6
Queen's Park	2–3	Morton	17 April 1976	3–4
Dumbarton	4–0	Raith Rovers	19 April 1976	6–2

=== Quarter-finals ===
==== First leg ====
Home team	Score	Away team	Date
Clydebank	1–0	East Fife	21 April 1976
Dumbarton	4–2	Falkirk	21 April 1976
Hamilton Academical	0–4	Airdrieonians	21 April 1976
Morton	1–0	St Mirren	21 April 1976

==== Second leg ====
Home team	Score	Away team	Date	Agg
Airdrieonians	5–0	Hamilton Academical	24 April 1976	9–0
East Fife	1–0	Clydebank	24 April 1976	1–1
Falkirk	1–2	Dumbarton	24 April 1976	3–6
St Mirren	0–1	Morton	24 April 1976	0–2

=== Semi-finals ===
Home team	Score	Away team	Date
Airdrieonians	3–1	Morton	28 April 1976
Clydebank	3–1	Dumbarton	28 April 1976

=== Final ===
3 May 1976

Airdrieonians	4 – 2 (a.e.t.)	Clydebank
McCulloch 74' 106', McVeigh 105'; Walker 115'		Larnach 2' 100'

Firhill Stadium
Attendance: 5,000
Referee: W Mullan (Dalkeith)

== Demise ==
It quickly became apparent that the competition was not proving popular with spectators, and club directors began to talk of further change. The Scottish Football League itself seemed to have an ambiguous attitude to the competition, failing to have the trophy engraved before the first final. In May 1976, a motion forwarded by Albion Rovers to have a 39-game Division One and Two calendar, effectively ending the Spring Cup, was overwhelmingly backed, coming into force for the start of the 1976–77 season.

== See also ==
- Scottish C Division League Cup
- Scottish B Division Supplementary Cup
- Scottish Challenge Cup
