= Cathcart F.C. =

Former association football club in Scotland

Cathcart
- Full name: Cathcart Football Club
- Founded: 1889
- Dissolved: 1892
- Ground: Eglinton Park
- President: Neil McIntosh
- Secretary: R. C. Boyce, J. Allan, J. M'Naught
Home colours

Cathcart Football Club was an association football club from Cathcart, south of Glasgow, active in the 1890s.

== History ==
Cathcart was formed in 1889, its first match being a 4–2 victory over Kilbarchan, played at Netherlee Park. The club was a member of the Renfrewshire association (Cathcart was not annexed to Glasgow until 1912). It played in the Renfrewshire Cup for the only time in 1889–90, beating the 1st R.R.V. in a first round replay, helped by the Volunteers having to play the first half with nine men as two players missed their train, and Cathcart scored four goals in their absence. Cathcart lost to Port Glasgow Athletic in the second round.

Cathcart joined the Scottish Football Association in August 1890 once it had secured a private ground. Its first tie in the 1890–91 Scottish Cup was a win at home to Pollokshaws Harp, by a score given as 5–1 or 5–3. The second round however was a disaster, the club losing 12–0 at Abercorn. Cathcart did beat Maryhill in its first match in the Govan Jubilee Cup, and drew the semi-final with Glasgow Wanderers, Cathcart's protests that a second equalizer for Wanderers had passed over rather than under the bar being in vain. It does not appear that the replay took place, despite Mr Campbell of the Wanderers making a public plea for Cathcart to reply to his correspondence for arranging the tie, and Wanderers played in the final.

The club took advantage of the move to a private ground to shift over to the Glasgow Association (this was permitted as they were now based just outside the city boundaries), and played in the 1890–91 and 1891–92 Glasgow Cup, losing in the first round both times. Cathcart also lost in the first preliminary round of the 1891–92 Scottish Cup to the moribund Ayr Athletic, and a rather hopeless protest that the Athletic players were not all wearing identical shirts was dismissed, as there was no confusion with the Cathcart outfit. The club did not play competitively after its Glasgow Cup loss and was struck from the Scottish FA roll in August 1892.

== Colours ==
The club played in dark blue jerseys and knickers, in honour of the old 23rd R.R.V. which came from the same area.

== Ground ==
After a season at Netherlee Park, the club opened its new ground, Eglinton Park, with a defeat to Battlefield. The ground was shared with Glasgow Wanderers, and was on the opposite side of the White Cart Water to Cathcart railway station.
