= Jim Donaldson (footballer) =

Scottish footballer (born 1958)

Personal information
- Full name: James McLintock Donaldson
- Date of birth: 24 December 1958 (age 67)
- Position: Midfielder

Youth career
- Eastercraigs

Senior career*
Years	Team	Apps	(Gls)
1975–1977	Dumbarton	6	(0)
1985–1988	Alloa Athletic	104	(4)
- * Club domestic league appearances and goals

James McLintock Donaldson (born 24 December 1958) is a former footballer who first signed up as a senior with Dumbarton. However, after two seasons, and being unable to earn a regular first team place, he joined the junior ranks and signed for Blantyre Vics before going on to play for Baillieston. Here he was spotted by Alloa Athletic in 1985, and went on to have 3 successful seasons with them.
