= Mark Treanor =

Scottish footballer

Personal information
- Date of birth: 1 April 1963 (age 63)
- Place of birth: Glasgow, Scotland
- Position: Defender

Youth career
- Eastercraigs

Senior career*
Years	Team	Apps	(Gls)
1979–1988	Clydebank	275	(13)
1988–1992	St Johnstone	105	(11)
1992–1993	Falkirk	3	(0)
1993–1994	Clydebank	14	(2)
1994–1995	Stranraer	4	(0)
Total		401	(26)
- * Club domestic league appearances and goals

Mark Treanor (born 1 April 1963) is a Scottish former professional footballer.

A right-back, Glasgow-born Treanor began his career with Clydebank in 1979. In nine years with the Bankies, he made 275 league appearances and scored 13 goals.

In March 1989, he joined St Johnstone and went on to make 105 appearances for the Perth club.

His next move, in 1992, was to Falkirk, for whom he played three games. The following year he returned to his first club, Clydebank, making fourteen appearances and scoring two goals.

In 1994, he signed for Stranraer, who would prove to be his final league club. He moved into junior football with Baillieston Juniors, where he brought his playing career to a close.
