= Jim Gallacher =

Scottish footballer

Personal information
- Full name: Jim Gallacher
- Date of birth: 29 March 1951 (age 75)
- Place of birth: Clydebank, Scotland
- Position: Goalkeeper

Senior career*
Years	Team	Apps	(Gls)
1969–1972	Arbroath	36	(0)
1972–1992	Clydebank	613	(0)
Total		649	(0)

Managerial career
- 1992–1997: Clydebank (Goalkeeper coach)
- 2001–2008: Scotland (Goalkeeper coach)
- 2008–2016: Dumbarton (Goalkeeper coach)
- * Club domestic league appearances and goals

James Gallacher (born 29 March 1951) is a Scottish former football goalkeeper. Gallacher played for Arbroath and Clydebank in the Scottish Football League. He made over 600 league appearances for the Bankies in a career that spanned four decades (late 1960s to early 1990s) and was fondly known as 'The Gal' by the club's supporters. He followed his playing career at New Kilbowie Park by coaching the club's goalkeepers until 1997. Then followed a spell from 2001 until 2008 coaching with the Scotland Women's National team. That ended and until 2016 Jim was goalkeeper coach at Dumbarton

His son, Paul Gallacher, also became a professional football goalkeeper, playing for Dundee United, Norwich City and Scotland, while his nephew Tony Gallacher was previously on the books of Liverpool.

== See also ==
- List of footballers in Scotland by number of league appearances (500+)
