= Beith Thistle F.C. =

Former association football club in Scotland

Beith Thistle
- Nickname(s): the Thistle
- Founded: 1881
- Dissolved: 1883
- Ground: Thistle Park
- Hon. Secretary: Andrew Guy
- Match Secretary: Thomas Harrington
- Captain: William Edmondstone
Home colours

Beith Thistle F.C. was an association football club from the town of Beith in Ayrshire.

== History ==
The Ayrshire club was formed in 1881, five years after Beith F.C., the first senior club in the town. An earlier Beith Thistle active in the 1870s appears to be an unrelated side.

With 15 wins out of 21 matches in its first season, and bolstered by an easy win over Beith towards the end of the season (by 5 goals, plus one disputed, to one), the Thistle felt confident enough to join the Scottish Football Association in June 1882. With 85 members, it was nearly as large as the older club, and one of the largest in the county.

One of the club's defeats in its first season was against Kilmarnock in the Ayrshire Cup third round - the club had little problem reaching that far, with an 8–1 win over Kilmarnock Arthurlie and a 5–2 win over Largs Athletic, but the 2–1 defeat to Kilmarnock was so unwelcome that the club managed to get the tie replayed after protesting a refereeing decision - only to lose again, this time 4–0, the opening goal being an own goal from the Beith goalkeeper mis-kicking.

However, in the 1882–83 Scottish Cup first round, the Beith F.C. had its revenge over the Thistle, coming from behind to win 4–2. The defeat seems to have undone the club - after one more match later in the month, a contentious 4–3 win over Lochwinnoch after the latter walked off in protest at a goal not being allowed, the club's final reported match is a 7–1 Ayrshire Cup second round defeat at Portland.

The club seems effectively to have merged with Beith, as captain Edmonstone, secretary Harrington, and leading scorer Brogan are all recorded as playing for Beith F.C. in October 1882. The last records for the club are an anomalous entry to the 1883–84 Scottish Cup (the 5s subscription paid by an unknown, possibly hoping to revive the club or gain a second chance for Beith players), Thistle unsurprisingly scratching to its first round opponent Hurlford; and the inevitable strike-off from the Scottish FA roll in August 1884, ironically at the same time as Beith.

== Colours ==
The club wore red jerseys and white knickers.

== Ground ==
The club's ground as a senior club, Thistle Park, was on Roughwood Road, 2 miles from the G & S.W. station and 1 mile from the G, B, and K station. The club moved there from Netherhill Field in December 1881.
