= Glasgow Wanderers F.C. =

Former association football club in Scotland

Glasgow Wanderers
- Full name: Glasgow Wanderers Football Club
- Nickname: the Wanderers
- Founded: 1889
- Dissolved: 1895
- Ground: Eglinton Park
- Secretary: John Dewar
Home colours	Away colours

Glasgow Wanderers Football Club was a 19th-century football club from Glasgow, which played for a season in the Scottish Football Federation.

== History ==
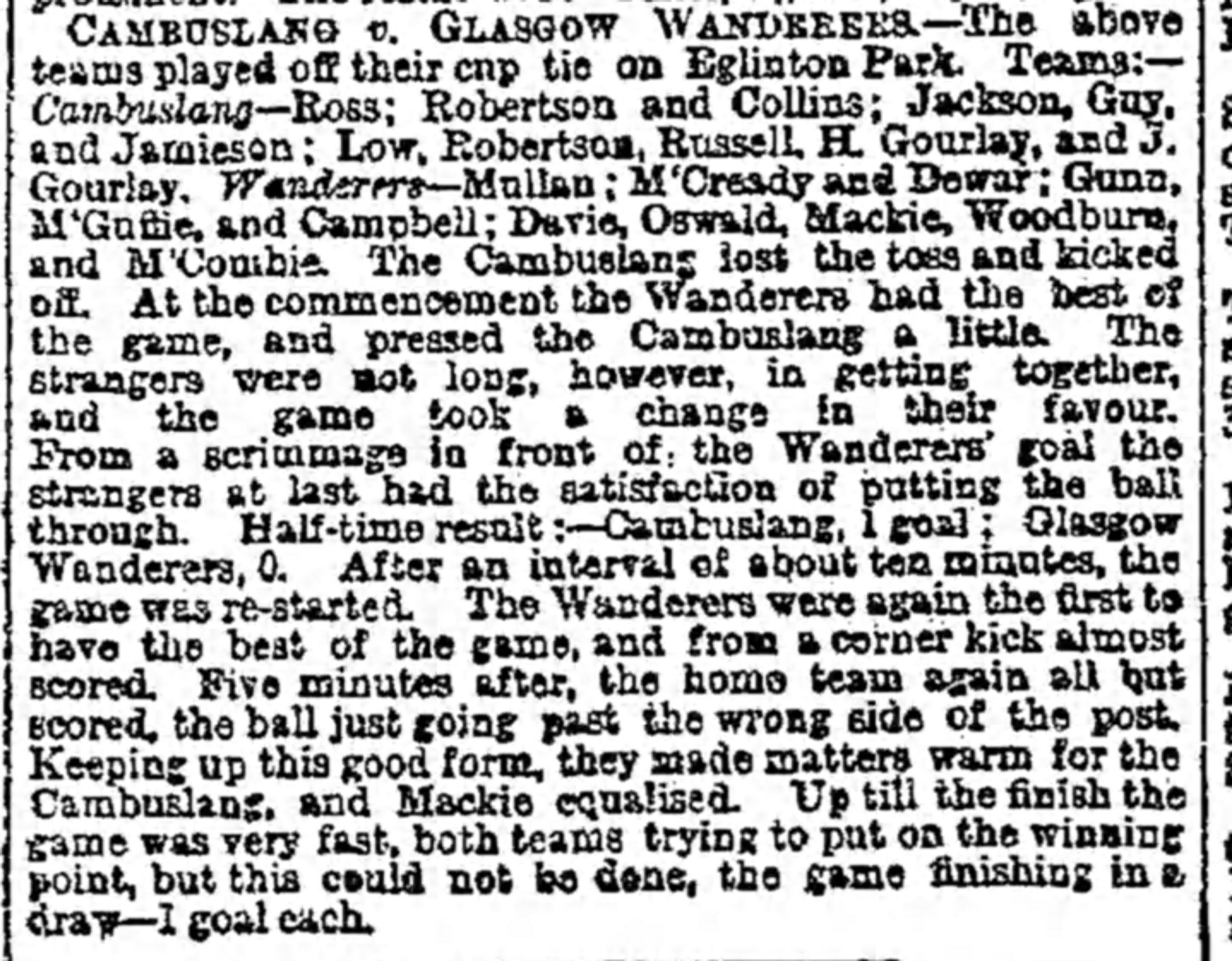
Report from the 1890–91 Glasgow Cup 1st Round tie with Cambuslang: Glasgow Herald, November 3, 1890

=== Victoria ===
The club was founded in 1889 under the name Victoria Athletic Club, and admitted to the Scottish Football Association and Glasgow Football Association that August, despite there being no record of it playing any matches beforehand.

The Victoria optimistically secured a ground at Eglinton Park in Govanhill and started to put up a barricade, but, in the 1889–90 Scottish Cup, the club visited Cowlairs, and was "slaughtered" 21–1. The Cowlairs back James MacPherson found matters so easy that he smoked a pipe during the match.

Given that Victoria had been drawn to visit Celtic in the Glasgow Cup, an even heavier defeat was likely, but the tie never took place. The club had started hosting matches by November 1889, when it lost 1–0 at home to Carlton, and it picked up a 5–3 win at home to the Third Lanark reserves in December.

=== Name change to Glasgow Wanderers ===
Following this improvement in form, the club held a meeting in February 1890, at which it changed its name to Glasgow Wanderers, a name which had been occasionally used for select XIs until 1887.

In the 1890–91 Scottish Cup first round, the club was drawn away to Cambuslang, and after equalizing an early Cambuslang goal, the Wanderers conceded two more before half time, and a dull second half saw the home team win 3–1.

Thanks to a win over Cathcart and a bye, the club reached the quarter-finals of the Glasgow Cup, and drew Cambuslang again. After a 6–0 win over Champfleurie in a friendly the Wanderers "say they fancy themselves to beat the Cambuslang in the Glasgow ties". The original tie at Eglinton Park ended 1–1; Cambuslang won the replay 4–1, but the Wanderers protested on several grounds, including that Cambuslang, rather than wearing their registered dark blue, changed into a white shirt, which was not distinguishable from the Wanderers' light blue change kit as the light fell. Most grounds were dismissed, but, as the referee conceded that he had ended the game nine minutes early because of darkness, the replay was re-played, again going Cambuslang's way, albeit only 2–1 this time.

The club also reached the final of the Govan Jubilee Cup that season, albeit it did not win a tie, relying on two walkovers, with semi-final opponent Cathcart refusing to answer correspondence to arrange a replay, after a 2–2 draw. The Wanderers were bested by Summerton Athletic in the final at the original Ibrox Park, going down 5–2.

=== Scottish Football Federation ===
The club was evidently ambitious, with a full programme for 1890–91, including a New Year tour of the north, and a match at Thistle F.C. which saw captain William Dewar sent off for using bad language. For 1891–92, despite the club's youth, it looked to join a football league, and club secretary John Dewar was one of the motive forces behind forming the Scottish Football Federation. The Federation was a competition for clubs overlooked by the new Scottish League and Scottish Football Alliance, forming a de facto third-tier competition. However Dewar left the club for Sunderland Albion before the season was properly under way and the club struggled, losing its first two matches 6–0 (to Royal Albert) and 7–2 (to Albion Rovers) before gaining its first win at Burnbank Swifts. The club struggled for the rest of the season, being bottom of the table after 18 matches, although a late run of wins saw the club climb above Motherwell and Burnbank (whose game against Falkirk never took place).

Its Cup runs were also short-lived, losing in the first preliminary round of the Scottish Cup to Partick Thistle, and in the second round of the Glasgow Cup (after a bye in the first) to Clyde. The Clyde match was particularly ill-tempered, being described as a "rabble affair" which ended with the Wanderers well behind after players "exchanged blows" and the Wanderers - despite being the home side - were "mobbed off the field". The club's protest was dismissed, although Clyde's M'Reedie was cautioned for "blacken[ing] the eyes of M'Innes, of the Wanderers".

=== Decline ===
The Wanderers withdrew from the Federation at the end of the season and its brief period as a competitive force was already over. That Clyde received the cheers in the Glasgow Cup tie at Eglinton Park suggests that the Wanderers had not found support in the crowded Glasgow football environment. The club continued to enter the Scottish Cup (and then the Scottish Qualifying Cup) until 1894–95, and never won a tie. The only time the club made it past the first qualifying round of the Scottish Cup was in walking over the United Abstainers in the first preliminary round in 1892. Wanderers then lost 9–2 at Pollokshaws in the second preliminary round.

The club had a similar lack of success in the Glasgow Cup. The club entered until 1893–94, and its only win had been its first tie against Cathcart. The club's final entry to the competition saw it lose 11–0 at Cowlairs - arriving "very late and a few men short" - and it scratched from its final Scottish Qualifying Cup entry after being drawn to play Motherwell. The club does not appear to have played during the 1894–95 season and was formally struck from the Scottish Football Association register in August 1895.

== Colours ==
The club played navy blue.

For the 1890 Glasgow Cup replay with Cambuslang, whose colours were dark blue, the Wanderers, as visiting club, had the choice of colours, and decided to play in a change strip of light blue.

== Ground ==
The club played at Eglinton Park. The clubhouse was subject to a burglary in September 1892, thieves escaping with club kits, four pairs of boots, and three footballs.

== Notable players ==
- William Dewar, who was chosen for an international trial match in 1891
