= Tarbolton F.C. =

Association football club in Scotland

Tarbolton
- Full name: Tarbolton Football Club
- Nickname(s): Burntonians
- Founded: 1876
- Dissolved: 1879
- Ground: Langlands
- Secretary: James Guthrie
Home colours

Tarbolton Football Club was a football club from the village of Tarbolton, Ayrshire, Scotland.

== History ==
The club was founded in 1876.

The club had a short existence, entering competitions between 1877 and 1879. The club's first competitive match was in the 1877–78 Scottish Cup and was a 1–1 draw at Maybole Carrick. Carrick won the replay, and also the Ayrshire Cup match between the two sides in the same season.

In 1878–79, the club lost again in the first round of the Scottish Cup, this time at Ladywell, but did win in the first round of the Ayrshire Cup, beating Vale of Irvine from Galston. The village club was overmatched in the second round against Kilmarnock Athletic and lost 7–1.

Although Tarbolton entered the national and county competitions for 1879–80, it scratched from both first round ties, and seems to have disbanded. Its last recorded match is a 7–1 defeat at the Mauchline reserve side.

== Colours ==
The club's colours were scarlet and white hooped jerseys and stockings, with white knickers.

== Grounds ==
The club played at a field at Langlands Farm, owned by farmers J. and A. H. Drinnan, and used the Crown Inn as a dressing room.
