= Ayr Thistle F.C. (1886) =

Former association football club in Scotland

Ayr Thistle
- Full name: Ayr Thistle Football Club
- Nickname(s): the Thistle
- Founded: 1886
- Dissolved: 1889
- Ground: Cattle Market Field
- Hon. President: J. Douglas Baird Esq.
- President: Wm. Miller Esq.
- Match Secretary: R. Paterson
Home colours

Ayr Thistle Football Club was an association football club from Ayr, Ayrshire, Scotland.

== History ==
The club was founded at a meeting at the Cattle Market Hotel in Ayr on Christmas Eve in 1886, on the basis that "the prestige of the Ayr Football Club seems to be a little on the wane, and interest in football matters generally seems to be dying"; the other senior club in the town, Ayr Rovers, was evidently not worthy of consideration. The club took the name Ayr Thistle in emulation of the previous club of that name.

The Thistle's first match was on New Year's Day, at home to Hurlford, and the attraction of the new team - plus the strength of its side - was such that Hurlford preferred the friendly to playing in the Ayrshire Charity Cup against Ayr Rovers. The Thistle still had not had time to build up a team, and borrowed Monaghan - who had recently moved from Ayr F.C. to Queen of the South Wanderers - to play in goal, but Thistle had still recruited Andrew Young from Ayr as captain, as well as M'Creadie, M'Lauchlan, John Fergusson, and Jack from the Ayr side. Despite the lack of team practice, and the strength of a Hurlford side which held the Ayrshire Cup, the home side only lost 6–4.

The club was too late to enter the Ayrshire Cup for 1886–87, but did enter in 1887–88, as well as the 1887–88 Scottish Cup, having joined the Scottish Football Association in August 1887. It lost both of its first round ties 8–2; at Kilmarnock in the national and Kilbirnie in the county. In Kilmarnock tie, Thistle briefly looked as if it could pull off a surprising comeback, bringing the score from 5–0 at half-time to 5–2 going into the last quarter of the game, but Kilmarnock scored three late goals. Kilbirnie was so comfortable in the county tie that it could undertake some tactical experimentation by swapping the backs and the wings.

In between the ties however the Thistle unexpectedly beat Ayr in a friendly 4–3, but the two cup defeats, followed by an 11–3 defeat for a weak side at Queen of the South Wanderers, seems to have dispirited the club, and the number of games it scheduled fell off alarmingly. The club's anniversary match was a muted affair, a 3–1 defeat to Mauchline with a "limited" attendance. The club fell apart even before the end of the club's first full season; it scratched from a tie in the Ayr Charity Cup with Shields Athletic, with reports that the Thistle had "broken up". The club was not quite dead yet, but the formation of Ayr Athletic, to replace an Ayr side moving to the north side of the river, and taking on some of the Thistle players and ground, killed off the club. Thistle had entered the 1888–89 Scottish Cup and was drawn to host the 2nd Ayrshire Rifle Volunteers in the first round, but scratched from the tie on the eve of the fixture.

The final indignity was that Young, James Donaldson, and James Robertson, as members of the club, faced a claim for £13 from Messrs W. & G. Ferguson, joiners, for the cost of erecting the clubhouse. Young claimed that he had left the club before the clubhouse was started; the sheriff held that the membership as a whole was responsible for payment of the defunct club's debts.

== Colours ==
The club wore blue and yellow hoops with blue knickers.

== Ground ==
The club's ground was at the Cattle Market Field in Ayr.
