= Hugh McLean (footballer) =

Scottish footballer

Personal information
- Full name: Hugh McLean
- Date of birth: 20 January 1952 (age 74)
- Place of birth: Stornoway, Scotland
- Position: Midfielder

Youth career
- Tantallon United

Senior career*
Years	Team	Apps	(Gls)
1966–1973	West Bromwich Albion	6	(0)
1974–1975	Swindon Town	19	(0)
1975–1981	Dumbarton	70	(16)
- * Club domestic league appearances and goals

Hugh McLean (born 20 January 1952) is a Scottish former footballer who played for West Bromwich Albion, Swindon Town and Dumbarton.
