= Largs Athletic F.C. =

Association football club in Scotland

Largs Athletic
- Full name: Largs Athletic Football Club
- Nickname(s): the Athletic
- Founded: 1880
- Dissolved: 1883
- Ground: Glebe Park
- Secretary: Alex E. Barbour
Home colours

Largs Athletic Football Club was a football club which existed in the early 1880s, in the town of Largs, Ayrshire, Scotland.

== History ==
The first club in the town, Largs Western, had the problem that Largs was not on a railway, so travel was difficult; it scratched from its two entries in the Ayrshire Cup in 1877–78 and 1878–79.

Consequently, senior football in Largs took time to settle, and Largs Athletic was the first attempt at one. The club was founded in November 1880, after a scratch match between married and single men caught the attention. It was also not particularly active, due to the travel difficulties, and in 1880–81 only played 9 times, winning 7 and losing 2. The club's most notable win that season was an unexpected 3–2 home win over St Mirren; the club finished the year with a positive balance of £4.

The club joined the Scottish Football Association in June 1881 and entered the 1881–82 Scottish Cup. Owing to some confusion at the Scottish FA, Largs Athletic was drawn to face Kilmarnock in the first round, but another club, simply called Largs, was also drawn to face Girvan. There was however no such club as Largs; unfortunately for the Athletic, it could not switch ties to play the smaller Girvan, and was beaten 6–0 at Kilmarnock. It also lost in its Ayrshire Cup debut, 5–2 at Beith Thistle.

1882–83 was the club's last season, as it was unable to secure its ground for the following campaign. It once more lost in the first round of the Scottish Cup - 7–0 at Annbank - but rode its luck in the Ayrshire to reach the semi-final; it had one bye, one walkover after Rankinston "lost its train", and one win, over West Kilbride. West Kilbride protested about Largs having "imported" players "from Glasgow, Rothesay &c" but as there was no evidence West Kilbride lost both its appeal and its deposit. In the semi-final Athletic's luck ran out, losing 10–0 to Lugar Boswell.

== Colours ==
The club wore scarlet jerseys and hose, and white knickers.

== Ground ==
The club's ground was Glebe Park in Brisbane Road. The club had had great difficulty in securing it as its ground, and after its first season had to pay a rent that "would put a Land Leaguer into hysterics".
