= Stewarton Cunninghame F.C. =

Association football club in Scotland

Stewarton Cunninghame
- Full name: Stewarton Cunninghame Football Club
- Nickname: the Bonnet Makers
- Founded: 1877
- Dissolved: 1905
- Ground: Standalone Park
Home colours

Stewarton Cunninghame Football Club was a football club from the town of Stewarton, Ayrshire, Scotland.

== History ==
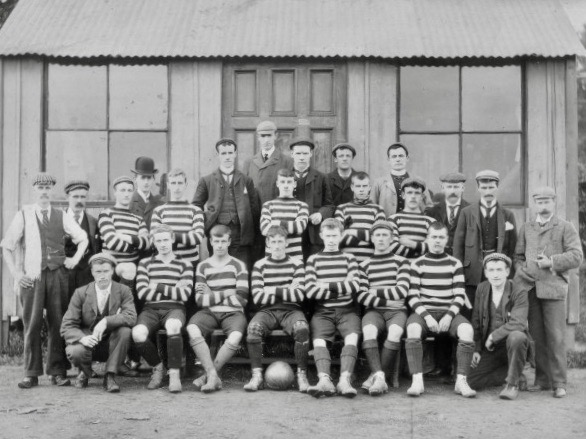
An undated Stewarton Cunninghame side, circa 1890

The club was formed in 1877 and took its name from the district of Cunninghame. The club's name was often given as Stewarton Cunningham or simply Stewarton. It first played competitive football in the 1879–80 season when it entered the Ayrshire Cup, reaching the third round. Its best run in the competition came in 1881–82, when it reached the fourth round.

The club made its debut in the Scottish Cup in 1879–80, losing 6–1 to Maybole Ladywell in the second round, a protest against encroachment getting short shrift. After a withdrawal, the club returned in 1881–82 by losing 9–0 at Portland, and the next year suffered a 5–3 home defeat to Ayr.

After losing Scottish Cup ties in 1883–84 and 1884–85 to Kilmarnock Athletic by 9–1 and 14–0 respectively, and 9–1 in the Ayrshire Cup to Mauchline in the latter year, the club left Senior football to become a member of the Scottish Junior Football Association, which made it ineligible to play in the Scottish Cup or the Ayrshire Cup.

The club reverted to Senior status in 1887, and seemingly reached the semi-final of the Ayrshire Cup with a 2–0 win over Annbank in 1887–88; however, after a protest "on account of the ground not being in good order", Annbank won the replayed tie 3–1, to the "great dissatisfaction" of the "little town". On its first entry back into the Scottish Cup in 1888–89, Cunninghame registered its only win in the main competition, 4–3 against the new Rosebank club of Kilmarnock, the match marking Rosebank's "first bow to a football crowd of any size"; Stewarton had been drawn away, but Rosebank's Holm Quarry ground had already been booked for a cricket match.

The rise of professionalism left the Bonnet Makers behind, and after two disastrous defeats in 1891–92 - 14–0 at home to Kilmarnock in the Ayrshire Cup, and 9–0 at Dalry in the qualifying rounds of the Scottish Cup - it returned to the Junior game. The club's greatest success in the Junior ranks was winning the Ayrshire Junior League in 1900–01, after a 5–1 play-off victory over the Afton Lads club. However the club left the competition before the 1904–05 season.

== Colours ==
The club's colours were originally navy shirts with white shorts, and later white jerseys with navy shorts; in 1888, the club changed to yellow and black, which remained the club's colours for the rest of its existence, other than a one-season flirtation with red and white stripes in 1899–1900.

== Grounds ==
The club originally played at High Cross Farm, moving to Standalone Park in 1880. Rosebank protested in 1888 that the ground had a tree and hedge growing on the touch line; the Scottish Football Association representatives at the meeting literally laughed at the protest. In 1892 the club moved to Rigghead Park.

== Notable player ==
- David Russell, who joined Preston North End F.C. as a professional in 1884.
