= James Campbell (footballer, born 1869) =

Scottish footballer

Personal information
- Full name: James Paterson Campbell
- Date of birth: 29 March 1869
- Place of birth: Kilmarnock, Scotland
- Date of death: 20 April 1938 (aged 69)
- Place of death: Kilmarnock, Scotland
- Position: Centre forward

Youth career
- Kilmarnock Thistle

Senior career*
Years	Team	Apps	(Gls)
1888–1901	Kilmarnock	74	(48)

International career
1891–1892	Scotland	2	(0)
- * Club domestic league appearances and goals

James Paterson Campbell (29 March 1869 – 20 April 1938) was a Scottish footballer who played for Kilmarnock and Scotland, mainly as a centre forward, though he could also play at centre half. He won the Scottish Football League's Division Two title twice (1897–98 and 1898–99), and played in the 1898 Scottish Cup Final which Kilmarnock lost to Rangers; in the previous season's competition he had scored 27 goals in 13 matches as they reached the semi-finals.
