= 1976–77 Scottish Second Division =

Scottish Second Division
- Season: 1976–77
- Champions: Stirling Albion
- Promoted: Stirling Albion; Alloa Athletic

The 1976–77 Scottish Second Division was won by Stirling Albion who, along with second placed Alloa Athletic, were promoted to the First Division. Forfar Athletic finished bottom.

== Table ==
Pos	Team	Pld	W	D	L	GF	GA	GD	Pts	Promotion
1	Stirling Albion (C, P)	39	22	11	6	59	29	+30	55	Promotion to the First Division
2	Alloa Athletic (P)	39	19	13	7	73	45	+28	51	Promotion to the First Division
3	Dunfermline Athletic	39	20	10	9	52	36	+16	50	
4	Stranraer	39	20	6	13	74	53	+21	46	
5	Queen's Park	39	17	11	11	65	51	+14	45	
6	Albion Rovers	39	15	12	12	74	61	+13	42	
7	Clyde	39	15	11	13	68	64	+4	41	
8	Berwick Rangers	39	13	10	16	37	51	−14	36	
9	Stenhousemuir	39	15	5	19	38	49	−11	35	
10	East Stirlingshire	39	12	8	19	47	63	−16	32	
11	Meadowbank Thistle	39	8	16	15	41	57	−16	32	
12	Cowdenbeath	39	13	5	21	46	64	−18	31	
13	Brechin City	39	7	12	20	51	77	−26	26	
14	Forfar Athletic	39	7	10	22	43	68	−25	24	

Source: "1976-1977 Second Division - SPFL Archive". SPFL.
Rules for classification: 1) points; 2) goal difference; 3) number of goals scored.
(C) Champions; (P) Promoted
