= 1976–77 Scottish First Division =

Scottish First Division
- Season: 1976–77
- Champions: St Mirren
- Promoted: St Mirren; Clydebank
- Relegated: Raith Rovers; Falkirk
- Matches played: 273
- Goals scored: 845 (3.1 per match)
- Top goalscorer: William Pirie (36)
- Biggest home win: Clydebank 8–1 Arbroath, 03.01.1977
- Biggest away win: Falkirk 0–8 Dundee, 22.01.1977

The 1976–77 Scottish First Division season was won by St Mirren, who were promoted along with Clydebank to the Premier Division. Raith Rovers and Falkirk were relegated to the Second Division.

== League table ==
Pos	Team	Pld	W	D	L	GF	GA	GD	Pts	Promotion or relegation
1	St Mirren (C, P)	39	25	12	2	91	38	+53	62	Promotion to the Premier Division
2	Clydebank (P)	39	24	10	5	89	38	+51	58	Promotion to the Premier Division
3	Dundee	39	21	9	9	90	55	+35	51	
4	Morton	39	20	10	9	77	52	+25	50	
5	Montrose	39	16	9	14	61	62	−1	41	
6	Airdrieonians	39	13	12	14	63	58	+5	38	
7	Dumbarton	39	14	9	16	63	68	−5	37	
8	Arbroath	39	17	3	19	46	62	−16	37	
9	Queen of the South	39	11	13	15	58	65	−7	35	
10	Hamilton Academical	39	11	10	18	44	59	−15	32	
11	St Johnstone	39	8	13	18	42	64	−22	29	
12	East Fife	39	8	13	18	40	71	−31	29	
13	Raith Rovers (R)	39	8	11	20	45	68	−23	27	Relegation to the Second Division
14	Falkirk (R)	39	6	8	25	36	85	−49	20	Relegation to the Second Division

Source: RSSSF and statto
Rules for classification: 1) points; 2) goal difference; 3) number of goals scored.
(C) Champions; (P) Promoted; (R) Relegated
