= 1976–77 Scottish Premier Division =

71st season of top-tier football league in Scotland

Scottish Premier Division
- Season: 1976–77
- Champions: Celtic; 1st Premier Division title 30th Scottish title
- Relegated: Heart of Midlothian; Kilmarnock
- European Cup: Celtic
- UEFA Cup: Aberdeen; Dundee United
- Cup Winners' Cup: Rangers
- Matches: 180
- Goals: 507 (2.82 per match)
- Top goalscorer: Willie Pettigrew (21)
- Biggest home win: Kilmarnock 6–1 Ayr United
- Biggest away win: Ayr United 0–5 Aberdeen

The 1976–77 Scottish Premier Division season was won by Celtic, nine points ahead of Rangers. Heart of Midlothian and Kilmarnock were relegated.

== Table ==
Pos	Team	Pld	W	D	L	GF	GA	GD	Pts	Qualification or relegation
1	Celtic (C)	36	23	9	4	79	39	+40	55	Qualification for the European Cup first round
2	Rangers	36	18	10	8	62	37	+25	46	Qualification for the Cup Winners' Cup first round
3	Aberdeen	36	16	11	9	56	42	+14	43	Qualification for the UEFA Cup first round
4	Dundee United	36	16	9	11	54	45	+9	41	Qualification for the UEFA Cup first round
5	Partick Thistle	36	11	13	12	40	44	−4	35	
6	Hibernian	36	8	18	10	34	35	−1	34	
7	Motherwell	36	10	12	14	57	60	−3	32	
8	Ayr United	36	11	8	17	44	68	−24	30	
9	Heart of Midlothian (R)	36	7	13	16	49	66	−17	27	Relegation to the 1977–78 Scottish First Division
10	Kilmarnock (R)	36	4	9	23	32	71	−39	17	Relegation to the 1977–78 Scottish First Division

Source: Statto
Rules for classification: 1) points; 2) goal difference; 3) number of goals scored.
(C) Champions; (R) Relegated

== Results ==
=== Matches 1–18 ===
During matches 1–18 each team plays every other team twice (home and away).

Home \ Away	ABE	AYR	CEL	DNU	HOM	HIB	KIL	MOT	PAR	RAN
Aberdeen		1–0	2–1	3–2	2–2	1–0	2–0	3–1	1–1	3–3
Ayr United	0–5		0–2	1–4	0–1	2–3	3–1	4–1	2–1	1–1
Celtic	2–2	3–0		5–1	2–2	1–1	2–1	2–0	2–1	2–2
Dundee United	3–2	2–2	1–0		1–1	2–1	3–0	2–0	2–1	0–0
Heart of Midlothian	2–1	2–2	3–4	1–2		0–1	2–2	2–1	0–0	0–1
Hibernian	0–0	1–0	1–1	1–2	1–1		2–0	0–2	0–0	1–1
Kilmarnock	1–2	6–1	0–4	1–0	2–1	1–1		1–1	0–0	0–4
Motherwell	1–1	4–1	2–2	1–1	1–1	2–2	5–4		3–0	3–1
Partick Thistle	2–2	0–2	2–4	1–5	2–1	1–1	2–1	2–0		2–1
Rangers	1–0	1–1	0–1	3–0	4–2	1–1	0–0	1–0	1–0	

Legend: Blue = home team win; Yellow = draw; Red = away team win.

=== Matches 19–36 ===
During matches 19–36 each team plays every other team twice (home and away).

Home \ Away	ABE	AYR	CEL	DNU	HOM	HIB	KIL	MOT	PAR	RAN
Aberdeen		0–2	2–0	0–1	4–1	0–0	2–0	2–1	0–2	2–1
Ayr United	0–0		2–4	1–4	1–1	1–2	1–1	3–2	1–1	0–2
Celtic	4–1	2–0		2–0	5–1	4–2	1–0	2–2	2–0	1–0
Dundee United	2–3	0–1	1–2		1–2	1–0	4–0	1–1	0–0	0–1
Heart of Midlothian	1–1	1–2	0–3	1–1		2–2	4–0	3–2	1–0	1–3
Hibernian	0–0	2–0	0–1	0–0	3–1		0–0	1–2	1–1	0–0
Kilmarnock	1–2	0–1	1–3	1–2	2–2	0–1		2–2	1–3	1–0
Motherwell	1–3	2–4	3–0	4–0	2–1	1–1	2–0		1–1	0–2
Partick Thistle	2–1	0–1	1–1	0–0	2–0	1–0	3–1	0–0		4–3
Rangers	1–0	5–1	2–2	2–3	3–2	2–1	3–0	4–1	2–1	

Legend: Blue = home team win; Yellow = draw; Red = away team win.

== Awards ==
Award	Winner	Club
SFWA Footballer of the Year	(Scotland) Danny McGrain	Celtic
