= Scottish Football Federation =

Association football competition, 1891–1893

The Scottish Football Federation was an association football competition formed in 1891 which ran for just two seasons. The proposal for a competition came from seven clubs (Falkirk, King's Park, Royal Albert, Glasgow Wanderers, Pollokshaws, Kilmarnock Athletic, and Arthurlie) which had been overlooked for the Scottish League and Scottish Football Alliance.

In 1893 it was absorbed by the Scottish Football Alliance when that league lost all but one of its members to the Scottish Football League's new Division Two.

== 1891–92 ==
Pos	Team	Pld	W	D	L	GF	GA	PTS
1	Arthurlie	22	16	3	3	107	38	35
2	Albion Rovers	22	15	1	6	88	51	31
3	Hurlford	22	11	4	7	58	51	26
4	Falkirk	21	11	3	7	61	49	25
5	Wishaw Thistle	22	10	4	8	69	71	24
6	Pollokshaws	22	10	2	10	73	58	22
7	Royal Albert	22	10	1	11	70	54	21
8	Kilmarnock Athletic	22	7	3	12	51	67	17
9	Clydebank	22	7	3	12	46	87	17
10	Glasgow Wanderers	22	7	2	13	44	88	16
11	Burnbank Swifts	21	4	6	11	49	80	14
12	Motherwell	22	4	6	12	58	80	14

- Burnbank Swifts v Falkirk was not played

== 1892–93 ==
Pos	Team	Pld	W	D	L	GF	GA	PTS
1	Royal Albert	18	11	5	2	66	36	27
2	Motherwell	18	11	3	4	77	46	25
3	Arthurlie	18	10	3	5	55	36	23
4	Neilston	18	10	3	5	40	28	23
5	Albion Rovers	18	8	3	7	66	52	19
6	Wishaw Thistle	18	8	1	9	55	39	17
7	East Stirlingshire	18	6	3	9	49	68	15
8	Falkirk	18	6	3	9	46	66	15
9	Pollokshaws	18	7	1	10	58	52	14
10	Clydebank	18	0	1	17	18	107	1

== Champions ==
- 1891–92 - Arthurlie
- 1892–93 - Royal Albert

== Member clubs ==
- Albion Rovers 1891–1893
- Arthurlie 1891–1893
- Burnbank Swifts 1891–1892
- Clydebank
- East Stirlingshire 1892–1893
- Falkirk 1891–1893
- Glasgow Wanderers 1891–1893
- Hurlford 1891–1893
- Kilmarnock Athletic 1891–1893
- Motherwell 1891–1893
- Neilston 1892–1893
- Pollokshaws 1891–1893
- Royal Albert 1891–1893
- Wishaw Thistle 1891–1893
