= Coylton Coila F.C. =

Former association football club in Scotland

Coylton Coila
- Full name: Coylton Coila Football Club
- Nickname: the Coila
- Founded: 1877
- Dissolved: 1883
- Ground: Bogside Park
- Chairman/Club Patron: Claud Hamilton Esq. of Sundrum
- Match Secretary: Richard Thomson
| Home colours | Away colours |

Coylton Coila Football Club was a Scottish association football club based in the village of Coylton, Ayrshire.

== History ==
The club was founded in 1877 out of a curling club. By 1879 it had enough members to form 2 sides. The club was named after Coila, the muse of national bard Robert Burns.

The club entered the Scottish Cup for the first time in 1880–81. In the first round it was drawn to play Kilmarnock Portland at the latter's Hamilton Park ground. Despite being a "very powerful-looking team", the village side was outmatched by the experienced Portland; the Coila conceded the first goal after ten minutes and by the end of the match had conceded seven more.

Coila also played in the Ayrshire Cup from 1878 to 1881. Its last tie in the competition - and seemingly its last ever match - was a semi-final defeat to Annbank in 1880–81. The club's run to the semi-final included a 5–0 win over Kilmarnock, Coila opening the scoring after three minutes; one report suggested that the heavier Coila team used hard charging to intimidate the Kilmarnock side although "we are happy to say that none of the casualties have, as yet, proved fatal", but another report recorded that there was only one foul given, and Kilmarnock's focus was on measuring the pitch to support a futile protest.

Although the club entered both the national and local competitions in 1881–82, it scratched before its first round tie in both; it was due to meet Hurlford in the Ayrshire Cup and Beith in the Scottish. The club was removed from the Scottish Football Association roll in August 1882 for non-payment of subscriptions. The club tried to make a comeback by entering the Ayrshire Cup in 1883–84, but again scratched from the competition before playing, this time because the Coila fell out with the Ayrshire FA committee.

== Colours ==
The club played in all white. In the Cup tie at Portland in 1880, the club wore red and white jerseys, as Portland's regular uniform was also white jerseys and knickers.

== Ground ==
The club played at Bogside Park, 2 miles from Drongan railway station, and 300 yards from the Coylton Arms Inn, which originally provided the club's facilities. In 1881 the club found a club house on premises in New Coylton, owned by Matthew Leggatt, landlord of the Finlayson Arms.
