= Cumnock F.C. (1875) =

Former association football club in Scotland

Cumnock
- Full name: Cumnnock Football Club
- Nickname(s): the Reds
- Founded: 1875
- Dissolved: 1886
- Ground: New Station Field
- Secretary: Arch. Campbell
Home colours

Cumnock Football Club was an association football club from Cumnock, Ayrshire, Scotland.

== History ==
The club was formed in 1875; its first season consisted of 7 matches, with 1 win, 3 draws, and 3 defeats. The club's first secretary, Archibald Campbell, worked at the Clydesdale Bank in town.

Cumnock entered the Scottish Cup from the 1876–77 season until 1886–87. The furthest it reached was the third round, which it managed on two occasions. The first time (in 1879–80) was without winning a tie; in the first round, the club was drawn at Irvine, but arrived 2 hours late because of a railway accident. The Scottish Football Association ordered a replay on the following Saturday, a coin toss giving Cumnock home advantage, but Irvine refused to comply, and the SFA therefore awarded the tie to Cumnock. Cumnock then had a second round bye, but lost at Hurlford in the third round. The club did not win a tie until 1880–81, beating Auchinleck Boswell 7–1 away in the first round, but losing again at Hurlford in the second.

The second time the club reached the third round was in 1883–84, having beaten Maybole 4–0 and enjoying a bye, then losing 4–1 at Cartvale. This match was the only time the club played a tie against a club not from Ayrshire.

Cumnock had a similar lack of success in the Ayrshire Cup, a competition which it entered from its first instalment in 1877–78 until 1886–87. In 1878–79 the club reached the third round for the only time and lost 8–0 at Kilmarnock Athletic, which went on to win the competition.

The 1885–86 season was the last in which the club played competitive matches. In the national and county cups it was eliminated by Hurlford by heavy scores; in the first round of the Scottish by 5 goals to 1, and in the second round of the Ayrshire by 8 goals to 2.

The club remained theoretically active in 1886–87, but it had to cede its first round tie against Kilmarnock in the Scottish Cup as being unable to raise a team. The club was scheduled to face the obscure Ballochmyle club - a side which only existed for one season - in the first round of the Ayrshire Cup before 25 September, but Cumnock scratched from that fixture too. The only reported match the club may have played in the season was a friendly defeat at Thornhill, the losing club being named as Old Cumnock.

== Colours ==
The club wore maroon shirts and white shorts. The club was known as the Reds, even though one report naming them as such confirms the shirt colour to have been maroon.

== Ground ==
The club originally played at Greenmill Holm on the Ayr Road. In 1879 the club moved to a ground near the new railway station, prosaically named New Station Field.
