= 1976–77 in Scottish football =

Premier Division champions
- Celtic

First Division champions
- St Mirren

Second Division champions
- Stirling Albion

Scottish Cup winners
- Celtic

League Cup winners
- Aberdeen

Junior Cup winners
- Kilbirnie Ladeside

Teams in Europe
- Celtic, Heart of Midlothian, Hibernian, Rangers

Scotland national team
- 1977 BHC, 1978 World Cup qualification
- ← 1975–76 1977–78 →

Season 1976–1977 was the 104th season of competitive football in Scotland and the 80th season of Scottish league football.

After the failure of the Spring Cup and the 26-game season in the First and Second Divisions, a 39-game season was instituted in these divisions with a slight imbalance in the number of home and away games played by each team; however, this was seen as preferable to a lengthy 52-game season.

== Scottish Premier Division ==
Pos	Team	Pld	W	D	L	GF	GA	GD	Pts	Qualification or relegation
1	Celtic (C)	36	23	9	4	79	39	+40	55	Qualification for the European Cup first round
2	Rangers	36	18	10	8	62	37	+25	46	Qualification for the Cup Winners' Cup first round
3	Aberdeen	36	16	11	9	56	42	+14	43	Qualification for the UEFA Cup first round
4	Dundee United	36	16	9	11	54	45	+9	41	Qualification for the UEFA Cup first round
5	Partick Thistle	36	11	13	12	40	44	−4	35	
6	Hibernian	36	8	18	10	34	35	−1	34	
7	Motherwell	36	10	12	14	57	60	−3	32	
8	Ayr United	36	11	8	17	44	68	−24	30	
9	Heart of Midlothian (R)	36	7	13	16	49	66	−17	27	Relegation to the 1977–78 Scottish First Division
10	Kilmarnock (R)	36	4	9	23	32	71	−39	17	Relegation to the 1977–78 Scottish First Division

Source: Statto
Rules for classification: 1) points; 2) goal difference; 3) number of goals scored.
(C) Champions; (R) Relegated

Champions: Celtic
Relegated: Hearts, Kilmarnock

== Scottish League First Division ==
Pos	Team	Pld	W	D	L	GF	GA	GD	Pts	Promotion or relegation
1	St Mirren (C, P)	39	25	12	2	91	38	+53	62	Promotion to the Premier Division
2	Clydebank (P)	39	24	10	5	89	38	+51	58	Promotion to the Premier Division
3	Dundee	39	21	9	9	90	55	+35	51	
4	Morton	39	20	10	9	77	52	+25	50	
5	Montrose	39	16	9	14	61	62	−1	41	
6	Airdrieonians	39	13	12	14	63	58	+5	38	
7	Dumbarton	39	14	9	16	63	68	−5	37	
8	Arbroath	39	17	3	19	46	62	−16	37	
9	Queen of the South	39	11	13	15	58	65	−7	35	
10	Hamilton Academical	39	11	10	18	44	59	−15	32	
11	St Johnstone	39	8	13	18	42	64	−22	29	
12	East Fife	39	8	13	18	40	71	−31	29	
13	Raith Rovers (R)	39	8	11	20	45	68	−23	27	Relegation to the Second Division
14	Falkirk (R)	39	6	8	25	36	85	−49	20	Relegation to the Second Division

Source: RSSSF and statto
Rules for classification: 1) points; 2) goal difference; 3) number of goals scored.
(C) Champions; (P) Promoted; (R) Relegated

Promoted: St. Mirren, Clydebank
Relegated: Raith Rovers, Falkirk

== Scottish League Second Division ==
Pos	Team	Pld	W	D	L	GF	GA	GD	Pts	Promotion
1	Stirling Albion (C, P)	39	22	11	6	59	29	+30	55	Promotion to the First Division
2	Alloa Athletic (P)	39	19	13	7	73	45	+28	51	Promotion to the First Division
3	Dunfermline Athletic	39	20	10	9	52	36	+16	50	
4	Stranraer	39	20	6	13	74	53	+21	46	
5	Queen's Park	39	17	11	11	65	51	+14	45	
6	Albion Rovers	39	15	12	12	74	61	+13	42	
7	Clyde	39	15	11	13	68	64	+4	41	
8	Berwick Rangers	39	13	10	16	37	51	−14	36	
9	Stenhousemuir	39	15	5	19	38	49	−11	35	
10	East Stirlingshire	39	12	8	19	47	63	−16	32	
11	Meadowbank Thistle	39	8	16	15	41	57	−16	32	
12	Cowdenbeath	39	13	5	21	46	64	−18	31	
13	Brechin City	39	7	12	20	51	77	−26	26	
14	Forfar Athletic	39	7	10	22	43	68	−25	24	

Source: "1976-1977 Second Division - SPFL Archive". SPFL.
Rules for classification: 1) points; 2) goal difference; 3) number of goals scored.
(C) Champions; (P) Promoted

Promoted: Stirling Albion, Alloa Athletic

== Cup honours ==
Competition	Winner	Score	Runner-up
Scottish Cup 1976–77	Celtic	1 – 0	Rangers
League Cup 1976–77	Aberdeen	2 – 1 (a.e.t.)	Celtic
Junior Cup	Kilbirnie Ladeside	3 – 1	Kirkintilloch Rob Roy

== Other honours ==
=== National ===
Competition	Winner	Score	Runner-up
Scottish Qualifying Cup - North	Peterhead	2 – 1	Inverness Caledonian
Scottish Qualifying Cup - South	Selkirk	2 – 1 * †	Civil Service Strollers

=== County ===
Competition	Winner	Score	Runner-up
Aberdeenshire Cup	Peterhead		
Ayrshire Cup	Ayr United	2 – 2 ‡	Kilmarnock
East of Scotland Shield	Hibernian	1 – 0	Hearts
Fife Cup	Dunfermline Athletic	5 – 2 *	Cowdenbeath
Forfarshire Cup	Dundee United	3 – 0	Arbroath
Lanarkshire Cup	Motherwell		Airdrie
Renfrewshire Cup	St Mirren	5 – 2 *	Morton
Stirlingshire Cup	Stirling Albion	0 – 0 ‡	Clydebank

^{*} - aggregate over two legs
† - play off
‡ - won on penalties

=== Highland League ===
Top Three
Pos	Team	Pld	W	D	L	GF	GA	GD	Pts
1	Inverness Caledonian	30	21	4	5	80	31	+49	46
2	Peterhead	30	21	4	5	77	35	+42	46
3	Nairn County	30	19	3	8	64	39	+25	41

== Individual honours ==
Award	Winner	Club
Footballer of the Year	(Scotland) Danny McGrain	Celtic

== Scotland national team ==
Date	Venue	Opponents	Score	Competition	Scotland scorer(s)
8 September	Hampden Park, Glasgow (H)	Finland	6–0	Friendly	Andy Gray (2), Eddie Gray, Kenny Dalglish, Bruce Rioch, Don Masson (pen.)
13 October	Sparta Stadion, Prague (A)	Czechoslovakia	0–2	WCQG7	
17 November	Hampden Park, Glasgow (H)	Wales	1–0	WCQG7	Own goal
27 April	Hampden Park, Glasgow (H)	Sweden	3–1	Friendly	Asa Hartford, Kenny Dalglish, Joe Craig
28 May	The Racecourse, Wrexham (A)	Wales	0–0	BHC	
1 June	Hampden Park, Glasgow (H)	Northern Ireland	3–0	BHC	Kenny Dalglish (2), Gordon McQueen
4 June	Wembley Stadium, London (A)	England	2–1	BHC	Gordon McQueen, Kenny Dalglish
15 June	Estadio Nacional, Santiago (A)	Chile	4–2	Friendly	Lou Macari (2), Kenny Dalglish, Asa Hartford
18 June	Boca Junior Stadium, Buenos Aires (A)	Argentina	1–1	Friendly	Don Masson
23 June	Estadio do Maracana, Rio de Janeiro (A)	Brazil	0–2	Friendly	

1977 British Home Championship - Winners

Key:

- (H) = Home match
- (A) = Away match
- WCQG7 = World Cup qualifying - Group 7
- BHC = British Home Championship
