= Maybole Carrick F.C. =

Association football club in Scotland

Maybole Carrick
- Full name: Maybole Carrick Football Club
- Founded: 1874
- Dissolved: 1883
- Ground: Myremill Holm
- Secretary: William Watson
Home colours

Maybole Carrick Football Club was a football club which existed in the 1870s, from the town of Maybole, Ayrshire, Scotland.

== History ==
The club was formed in 1874 and took its name from the district of Carrick. The earliest known match reported by a major newspaper was a defeat at Ayr Academy in January 1876.

The club was one of the smaller clubs in Ayrshire, but nevertheless did enter the Scottish Cup regularly from 1876–77 to 1879–80, and the Ayrshire Cup from its inauguration in 1877–78 for three seasons. Its first competitive match was a 5–0 defeat at Kilbirnie in the 1875–76 Scottish Cup.

The only substantial run the club had was in the 1877–78 Scottish Cup, when wins over Tarbolton and Queen of the South Wanderers (the latter game played at Cumnock) put the club into the third round, which was made up of 16 clubs, and 4 in the Ayrshire section. The club was drawn to visit Beith but lost 3–0, generally being outclassed by the home side, the third goal from M'Quire being a rare header.

After the 1879–80 season, in which the club was eliminated in the first round of the Scottish Cup at Hurlford by 8–1, the club gave up on senior football, becoming a junior club; the town's senior representation being continued by the new Maybole club. The club was playing junior football until at least 1883.

== Colours ==
The club's colours were red and blue hoops, with white shorts and blue stockings.

== Grounds ==
The club originally played at Myremill Holm.
