= 1977–78 Scottish First Division =

Scottish First Division
- Season: 1977–78
- Champions: Morton
- Promoted: Morton; Heart of Midlothian
- Relegated: Alloa Athletic; East Fife
- Matches played: 273
- Goals scored: 810 (2.97 per match)
- Top goalscorer: William Pirie (35)
- Biggest home win: Dundee 6–0 Alloa Athletic, 14.01.1978
- Biggest away win: Arbroath 0–7 Heart of Midlothian, 24.12.1977

The 1977–78 Scottish First Division season was won by Morton, who were promoted along with Heart of Midlothian to the Premier Division. Alloa Athletic and East Fife were relegated to the Second Division.

== League table ==
| Pos | Team | Pld | W | D | L | GF | GA | GD | Pts | Promotion or relegation |
|---|---|---|---|---|---|---|---|---|---|---|
| 1 | Morton (C, P) | 39 | 25 | 8 | 6 | 85 | 42 | +43 | 58 | Promotion to the Premier Division |
| 2 | Heart of Midlothian (P) | 39 | 24 | 10 | 5 | 77 | 42 | +35 | 58 | Promotion to the Premier Division |
| 3 | Dundee | 39 | 25 | 7 | 7 | 91 | 44 | +47 | 57 | |
| 4 | Dumbarton | 39 | 16 | 17 | 6 | 65 | 48 | +17 | 49 | |
| 5 | Stirling Albion | 39 | 15 | 12 | 12 | 60 | 52 | +8 | 42 | |
| 6 | Kilmarnock | 39 | 14 | 12 | 13 | 52 | 46 | +6 | 40 | |
| 7 | Hamilton Academical | 39 | 12 | 12 | 15 | 54 | 56 | −2 | 36 | |
| 8 | St Johnstone | 39 | 15 | 6 | 18 | 52 | 64 | −12 | 36 | |
| 9 | Arbroath | 39 | 11 | 13 | 15 | 42 | 55 | −13 | 35 | |
| 10 | Airdrieonians | 39 | 12 | 10 | 17 | 50 | 64 | −14 | 34 | |
| 11 | Montrose | 39 | 10 | 9 | 20 | 55 | 71 | −16 | 29 | |
| 12 | Queen of the South | 39 | 8 | 13 | 18 | 44 | 68 | −24 | 29 | |
| 13 | Alloa Athletic (R) | 39 | 8 | 8 | 23 | 44 | 84 | −40 | 24 | Relegation to the Second Division |
| 14 | East Fife (R) | 39 | 4 | 11 | 24 | 39 | 74 | −35 | 19 | Relegation to the Second Division |

Source: RSSSF and statto
Rules for classification: 1) points; 2) goal difference; 3) number of goals scored.
(C) Champions; (P) Promoted; (R) Relegated
