= Maybole F.C. (1880) =

Association football club in Scotland

Maybole
- Full name: Maybole Football Club
- Nickname(s): the Shoemakers, Athletic
- Founded: 1880
- Dissolved: 1892
- Ground: Myremill Holm
- Secretary: W. E. Crawford, John Wallace
1880–86 colours	1888–91 colours

Maybole Football Club was a football club which existed from 1880 to 1891, in the town of Maybole, Ayrshire, Scotland.

== History ==
The club was formed in 1880 and instantly entered the Scottish Cup. The club took over the ground of the previous senior club in the town, Maybole Carrick, which had become a junior club. Maybole entered the competition every year until 1891–92, twice reaching the third round.

Maybole was drawn to play Rankinston Mountaineers in the first round in its first three entries. In the 1880–81 Scottish Cup, Maybole apparently lost, but protested successfully against the lack of ropes and the Mountaineers' rough play, and the Scottish FA ordered a replay with a neutral referee. The replay took place at Springvale Park, the home of Ayr F.C., and Maybole scored a "decisive" 3–1 victory. In 1881–82 Maybole won 7–0, with goals scored by Houston (2), Crawford (2), Kinney, Macdonald, and Rodger; the score was the record win for the club. In 1882–83, Rankinston scratched.

The club's Ayrshire Cup defeat by Ayr F.C. in the first round in 1884–85 led to a curious sequel. The Ayrshire Post criticized the Maybole fans as being "a disgrace to the town" because of their "wild howlings". This led to a reply by one John Clydesdale, stating that the Ayr fans were "the most unruly in the county", but after a rejoinder from 'a native of Maybole' that the Maybole fans were an "unruly crowd of spectators" giving forth "an unearthly yell...which continued more or less to the end of the game. I forbear even to hint of the language they used to the Ayr players", and accusing him of being the "worse of drink" spectator who "took off his coat and hat and went over the ropes to help Maybole", John Clydesdale wrote back to say that the letter purporting to be from him was a forgery.

The club's last entry to the Scottish Cup, in 1891–92, was after the introduction of qualifying rounds. In the first qualifying round, the club was drawn to play Mauchline, but withdrew, and the last recorded match for the club was a 9–0 defeat to Kilbirnie in the Ayrshire Cup that season. The club did enter in 1892–93, but scratched from the competition before the first round. Senior football re-started in 1895 with the formation of a new Maybole club.

== Colours ==
The club's colours were as follows:

- 1880–86: maroon shirts, white shorts
- 1886–88: black & white stripes
- 1888–91: blue shirt, white shorts

== Grounds ==
The club originally played at Myremill Holm. From the start of the 1884–85 season, the club moved to a new ground at Gardenrose Farm, immediately above the railway station.
