= 1881–82 Scottish Cup =

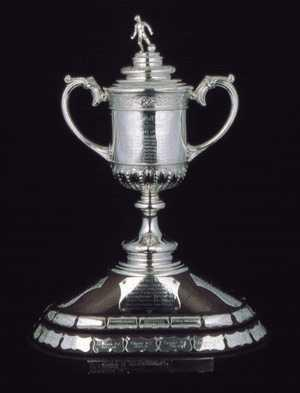
- The Scottish Cup trophy

Tournament details
- Country: Scotland
- Teams: 147

Final positions
- Champions: Queen's Park (sixth title)
- Runners-up: Dumbarton

Tournament statistics
- Matches played: 138
- Goals scored: 691 (5.01 per match)

The 1881–82 Scottish Cup – officially the Scottish Football Association Challenge Cup – was the ninth season of Scotland's most prestigious football knockout competition. A total of 147 teams entered the competition, five more than the previous record set in 1879–80. For the second season in a row, defending champions Queen's Park played Dumbarton in the final. After the original match finished in a 2–2 draw on 18 March 1882, Queen's Park won the trophy for a sixth time with a 4–1 win in the replay 1 April 1882.

== Calendar ==
As with the previous competitions, the eighth edition of the Scottish Cup took on the format of a traditional knockout tournament. For the earlier rounds, the names of competing teams were placed into lots according to their districts and drawn into pairs. The home team for each tie was determined by the toss of a coin unless it was mutually agreed or only one of the two clubs drawn against one another had a private ground. In the event of a draw, the team who lost the toss would have the choice of ground for the replay. A similar procedure was used for subsequent rounds however, any club which had received a bye in the previous round would first be drawn against one of the winners of the previous round. The names of winning teams were placed into one lot for later rounds. The choice of venue for the final matches was reserved to the Scottish Football Association.

Round	First match date	Fixtures			Clubs
Round	First match date	Original	Byes	Replays	Clubs
First Round	27 August 1881	68	11	5	147 → 79
Second Round	1 October 1881	35	9	5	79 → 45
Third Round	22 October 1881	18	9	7	45 → 27
Fourth Round	12 November 1881	11	5	2	27 → 16
Fifth Round	3 December 1881	8	0	2	16 → 8
Quarter-finals	31 December 1881	4	0	1	8 → 4
Semi-finals	18 February 1882	2	0	0	4 → 2
Final	18 March 1882	1	0	1	2 → 1

- Both Glasgow and Edinburgh Universities were given byes to the third round.
- Two teams qualified for the third round after drawing their second round replay.

== Teams ==
Of the 154 teams, all bar one entered the competition in the first round. Dunblane Wanderers were admitted into the competition after the first round draw and entered in the second round.

Ayrshire	Dunbartonshire	Glasgow and Suburbs		Lanarkshire	Renfrewshire
Annbank; Auchinleck Boswell; Ayr; Beith; Catrine; Coylton Coila; Cumnock; Dean; Girvan; Hurlford; Irvine; Kilbirnie; Kilmarnock; Kilmarnock Athletic; Kilmarnock Portland; Lanemark; Largs; Largs Athletic; Lugar Boswell; Mauchline; Maybole; Rankinston; Stewarton Cunninghame	Alclutha; Dumbarton; Helensburgh; Jamestown; Kilmaronock Thistle; Kirkintilloch Athletic; Lennox; Renton; Star of Leven; Vale of Leven; Victoria	Alexandra Athletic; Annfield; Athole; Battlefield; Caledonian; City; Clyde; Clydesdale; Cowlairs; Dennistoun; Eastern Athletic; Glasgow University; Govan; Harmonic; Ingram; John Elder; Jordanhill; Kelvinbank; Kinning Park Athletic	Luton; Mavisbank; Northern; Oxford; Partick; Partick Thistle; Petershill; Pilgrims; Pollokshields Athletic; Possil Bluebell; Possilpark; Queen's Park; Rangers; Shawlands Athletic; South Western; Whitefield; Windsor; 1st Lanark RV; 3rd Lanark RV	Airdrie; Airdriehill; Airdrieonians; Bellshill; Cambuslang; Clarkston; Drumpellier; Glengowan; Hamilton Academical; Lanark; Plains Blue Bell; Royal Albert; Shotts; Stonelaw; Thistle; Tollcross Athletic; Uddingston; Upper Clydesdale; West Benhar	Abercorn; Arthurlie; Barrhead; Cartside; Cartvale; Glenkilloch; Johnstone; Johnstone Athletic; Johnstone Rovers; Kennishead; Kilbarchan; Ladyburn; Levern; Morton; Netherlee; Paisley Athletic; Pollok; Port Glasgow Athletic; Renfrew; St Mirren; Southern; Thornliebank; Wellington Park; Yoker
Dumfriesshire	Edinburgh	Forfarshire	Stirlingshire	Perthshire	Wigtownshire
Moffat; Queen of the South Wanderers; 5th Kirkcudbrightshire RV	Addiewell; Brunswick; Dunfermline; Edinburgh University; Hanover; Heart of Midlothian; Hibernian; Kinleith; St Bernard's; West Calder	Arbroath; Dundee Harp; Dundee Our Boys; St Clement's; Strathmore	Bridge of Allan; Campsie Athletic; Campsie Central; Dunipace; Falkirk; Grasshoppers; King's Park; Lenzie; Milton of Campsie; Southfield; Strathblane; Thistle Athletic	Aberfeldy; Blairgowrie; Dunblane Wanderers; Coupar Angus; Dunkeld; Rob Roy; Vale of Teith	Cree Rovers; Stranraer

Notes

1. A-There is no record of a club called Largs that existed in the 1880s. It is believed they were entered erroneously alongside a number of clubs which had disbanded before the first round draw as a result of confusion with Largs Athletic.

== First round ==
=== Matches ===
==== Glasgow and Suburbs ====
Luton received a bye to the second round. Glasgow University received a bye to the third round.

10 September 1881	Rangers	2–1	3rd Lanark RV	Kinning Park
	Weir; Pringle			Stadium: Kinning Park; Attendance: 3,000

10 September 1881	Mavisbank	1–3	Partick Thistle	Glasgow
				Stadium: Lorne Park

10 September 1881	Pollokshields Athletic	1–3	Petershill	Pollokshields
				Stadium: Pollok Park

10 September 1881	Annfield	1–1	Eastern Athletic	Glasgow

10 September 1881	Battlefield	1–3	Northern	Langside
				Stadium: Overdale Park

17 September 1881	1st Lanark RV	0–7	Cowlairs	Glasgow
				Stadium: Burnbank Park

17 September 1881	Queen's Park	14–0	Caledonian	Crosshill
				Stadium: Hampden Park

17 September 1881	Partick	5–1	Possilpark	Partick
				Stadium: Inchview

Harmonic	w/o	Govan

South Western	w/o	Jordanhill

John Elder	w/o	Shawlands Athletic

Windsor	w/o	Whitefield

Athole	—	Ingram

Clydesdale	w/o	Clyde

Alexandra Athletic	w/o	Possil Bluebell

Dennistoun	—	City

Oxford	w/o	Pilgrims

Kelvinbank	w/o	Kinning Park Athletic

==== Renfrewshire district ====
3 September 1881	St Mirren	5–1	Johnstone Rovers	Paisley
				Stadium: Thistle Park

10 September 1881	Kilbarchan	8–1	Ladyburn	Kilbarchan
				Stadium: Whitlands

10 September 1881	Johnstone	9–1	Greenock Southern	Johnstone
				Stadium: Cartland Bank

10 September 1881	Thornliebank	5–0	Johnstone Athletic	Thornliebank
				Stadium: Deacon's Bank Park

10 September 1881	Netherlee	1–4	Wellington Park	Netherlee
				Stadium: Netherlee Park

10 September 1881	Levern	4–2	Morton	Hurlet
				Stadium: Wellington Park

10 September 1881	Abercorn	3–3	Arthurlie	Paisley
				Stadium: Blackstoun Park

10 September 1881	Barrhead	0–2	Glenkilloch	Barrhead
				Stadium: Beacon's Field

17 September 1881	Paisley Athletic	6–1	Port Glasgow Athletic	Paisley
				Stadium: East Park

17 September 1881	Cartvale	4–2	Renfrew	Busby
				Stadium: Cartbridge Park

Kennishead	w/o	Yoker

Cartside	w/o	Pollok

==== Ayrshire district ====
Annbank received a bye to the second round.

10 September 1881	Lugar Boswell	3–0	Lanemark	Lugar
				Stadium: Thomerson Field

10 September 1881	Kilmarnock	6–0	Largs Athletic	Kilmarnock
	Hay (x2)			Stadium: Rugby Park

10 September 1881	Cumnock	1–1	Mauchline	Cumnock
				Stadium: New Station Field

17 September 1881	Kilmarnock Athletic	7–1	Ayr	Kilmarnock
				Stadium: Holm Quarry

17 September 1881	Maybole	7–0	Rankinston Mountaineers	Maybole
				Stadium: Myremill Holm

17 September 1881	Stewarton Cunninghame	0–10	Kilmarnock Portland	Stewarton
				Stadium: Standalone Park

Largs	—	Girvan

Irvine	w/o	Hurlford

Coylton Coila	w/o	Beith

Dean	w/o	Auchinleck Boswell

Kilbirnie	w/o	Catrine

==== Dunbartonshire district ====
Helensburgh Victoria received a bye to the second round.

10 September 1881	Kilmaronock Thistle	2–6	Helensburgh	Gartocharn
				Stadium: Ardoch

10 September 1881	Dumbarton	9–1	Alclutha	Dumbarton
				Stadium: Boghead Park

Star of Leven	w/o	Kirkintilloch Athletic

Renton	w/o	Jamestown

Lennox	w/o	Vale of Leven

==== Stirlingshire district ====
10 September 1881	Falkirk	3–0	King's Park	Falkirk
				Stadium: Blinkbonny Park

10 September 1881	Southfield	0–3	Milton of Campsie	Slamannan

17 September 1881	Bridge of Allan	1–1 (a.e.t.)	Thistle Athletic	Bridge of Allan
				Stadium: Coneyhill Park

1 October 1881	Strathblane	7–0	Dunipace	Blanefield
				Stadium: Cuilt Park

Grasshoppers	w/o	Campsie Central

Campsie Athletic	w/o	Lenzie

==== Lanarkshire district ====
Airdrieonians received a bye to the second round.

10 September 1881	Glengowan	2–4	West Benhar	Caldercruix
				Stadium: Dumbreck Park

10 September 1881	Cambuslang	5–0	Royal Albert	Cambuslang
				Stadium: Bogleshole

10 September 1881	Hamilton Academical	1–0	Plains Blue Bell	Hamilton
				Stadium: South Haugh

10 September 1881	Shotts	5–1	Drumpellier	Shotts
				Stadium: Springhill Farm

Lanark	w/o	Clarkston

Upper Clydesdale	w/o	Uddingston

Thistle	w/o	Stonelaw

Airdrie	w/o	Tollcross Athletic

Airdriehill	w/o	Bellshill

==== Edinburgh district ====
Dunfermline received a bye to the second round. Edinburgh University received a bye to the third round.

27 August 1881	Hibernian	7–0	Addiewell	Edinburgh
				Stadium: Hibernian Park

10 September 1881	St Bernard's	1–0	Heart of Midlothian	Edinburgh
				Stadium: Royal Gymnasium Ground

10 September 1881	Hanover	2–3	Brunswick	Edinburgh
				Stadium: Tynecastle Park

17 September 1881	West Calder	5–1	Kinleith	West Calder
				Stadium: Burngrange Park

==== Perthshire district ====
10 September 1881	Blairgowrie	0–4	Coupar Angus	Blairgowrie

Dunkeld	w/o	Rob Roy

Vale of Teith	w/o	Aberfeldy

==== Forfarshire district ====
Dundee Harp received a bye to the second round.

10 September 1881	Arbroath	1–2	Dundee Our Boys	Arbroath
				Stadium: Gayfield Park

Strathmore	w/o	St Clement's

==== Wigtownshire district ====
Stranraer	w/o	Cree Rovers

==== Dumfriesshire district ====
Queen of the South Wanderers received a bye to the second round.

17 September 1881	5th Kirkcudbrightshire RV	3–2 (a.e.t.)	Moffat	Dumfries
				Stadium: Palmerston Park

=== Replays ===
==== Glasgow and Suburbs ====
Eastern Athletic	w/o	Annfield

==== Renfrewshire district ====
17 September 1881	Arthurlie	4–0	Abercorn	Barrhead
				Stadium: Arthurlie Cross

==== Ayrshire district ====
17 September 1881	Mauchline	5–1	Cumnock	Mauchline
				Stadium: Connel Park

==== Stirlingshire district ====
1 October 1881	Thistle Athletic	8–0	Bridge of Allan	Milngavie
				Stadium: Drumclog Park

Notes

1. B-Match not played. Both clubs had disbanded before the first round took place.
2. C-Annfield disbanded before their replay with Eastern Athletic.
3. D-Match not played. Girvan disbanded before the first round took place and Largs were erroneously included in the draw.

== Second round ==
=== Matches ===
==== Glasgow and Suburbs ====
Petershill received a bye to the third round.

1 October 1881	Luton	1–9	Northern	Glasgow
				Stadium: Lorne Park

1 October 1881	Partick	3–0	Kinning Park Athletic	Partick
				Stadium: Inchview

1 October 1881	Alexandra Athletic	4–1	Whitefield	Glasgow
				Stadium: Kennyhill Park

1 October 1881	Partick Thistle	3–1 (Void)	Pilgrims	Partick
				Stadium: Jordanvale Park

8 October 1881	Queen's Park	2–2	Cowlairs	Crosshill
				Stadium: Hampden Park

Rangers	w/o	Harmonic

Eastern Athletic	w/o	South Western

John Elder	w/o	Clyde

==== Renfrewshire district ====
Johnstone were drawn to receive a bye to the third round and, after initially being omitted from the draw, Cartvale were granted a bye to the third round.

1 October 1881	Arthurlie	3–0	Pollok	Barrhead
				Stadium: Arthurlie Cross

1 October 1881	Levern	3–4	Thornliebank	Hurlet
				Stadium: Darnley Holm

8 October 1881	Paisley Athletic	3–1	St Mirren	Paisley
				Stadium: East Park

8 October 1881	Wellington Park	3–4	Kilbarchan	Greenock
				Stadium: Wellington Park

8 October 1881	Glenkilloch	2–0	Yoker	Neilston
				Stadium: Butterwell Park

==== Ayrshire district ====
Kilbirnie received a bye to the third round.

1 October 1881	Kilmarnock Athletic	5–0	Maybole	Kilmarnock
				Stadium: Holm Quarry

8 October 1881	Lugar Boswell	3–1	Annbank	Lugar
				Stadium: Thomerson Field

8 October 1881	Mauchline	1–1	Kilmarnock Portland	Mauchline
				Stadium: Connel Park

8 October 1881	Kilmarnock	7–1	Auchinleck Boswell	Kilmarnock
	Burnett; Morton; Hamilton; Robertson			Stadium: Rugby Park

1 October 1881	Beith	3–3	Hurlford	Beith
				Stadium: Gateside Toll

==== Lanarkshire district ====
1 October 1881	Cambuslang	6–2	Airdrieonians	Cambuslang
				Stadium: Bogleshole

1 October 1881	Thistle	10–0	Uddingston	Lanark

1 October 1881	Airdrie	1–1	Airdriehill	Airdrie
				Stadium: Rochsoles

1 October 1881	Clarkston	1–2	West Benhar	Airdrie
				Stadium: Blackrigg Farm

8 October 1881	Shotts	2–1	Hamilton Academical	Shotts
				Stadium: Springhill Farm

==== Stirlingshire district ====
8 October 1881	Grasshoppers	0–5	Falkirk	Bonnybridge
				Stadium: Milnquarter

8 October 1881	Milton of Campsie	3–1 (Void)	Lenzie	Milton of Campsie
				Stadium: Brassburn Park

8 October 1881	Thistle Athletic	3–2	Strathblane	Milngavie
				Stadium: Drumclog Park

==== Dunbartonshire district ====
1 October 1881	Vale of Leven	0–2	Dumbarton	Alexandria
			Own goal	Stadium: North Street Park; Attendance: 4,000

8 October 1881	Jamestown	5–0	Star of Leven	Jamestown
				Stadium: Balloch Road

Helensburgh	w/o	Helensburgh Victoria

==== Edinburgh district ====
Brunswick received a bye to the third round.

8 October 1881	Hibernian	2–1	St Bernard's	Edinburgh
	Rourke (x2)			Stadium: Hibernian Park; Attendance: 5,500

West Calder	w/o	Dunfermline

==== Perthshire district ====
1 October 1881	Rob Roy	3–1	Coupar Angus	Callander
				Stadium: Garmhor Park

8 October 1881	Dunblane Wanderers	2–6	Vale of Teith	Dunblane
				Stadium: Kippenross Park

==== Forfarshire district ====
Strathmore received a bye to the third round.

8 October 1881	Dundee Harp	1–1	Dundee Our Boys	Dundee
				Stadium: Tayside Park

==== Dumfriesshire district ====
8 October 1881	5th Kirkcudbrightshire RV	1–2 (a.e.t.)	Queen of the South Wanderers	Dumfries
				Stadium: Palmerston Park

==== Wigtownshire district ====
Stranraer received a bye to the third round.

=== Replays ===
==== Glasgow and Suburbs ====
15 October 1881	Queen's Park	9–0	Cowlairs	Crosshill
				Stadium: Hampden Park

15 October 1881	Partick Thistle	7–1	Pilgrims	Partick
				Stadium: Jordanvale Park

==== Ayrshire district ====
15 October 1881	Kilmarnock Portland	1–5	Mauchline	Kilmarnock
				Stadium: Hamilton Park

8 October 1881	Hurlford	4–4	Beith	Hurlford
				Stadium: Struthens Park

==== Lanarkshire District ====
22 October 1881	Airdriehill	2–3	Airdrie	Airdrie
				Stadium: Airdriehill Park

==== Stirlingshire district ====
15 October 1881	Milton of Campsie	2–0	Lenzie	Milton of Campsie
				Stadium: Brassburn Park

==== Forfarshire district ====
15 October 1881	Dundee Our Boys	5–2	Dundee Harp	Dundee
				Stadium: Baxter Park

Notes

1. E-A protest by Pilgrims that the ground was "not properly roped and staked" was upheld and a replay was ordered.
2. F-A protest by Lenzie that "the field was a stubble one" was upheld and a replay was ordered.
3. G-Both teams qualified for the third round.

== Third round ==
=== Matches ===
==== Glasgow and Suburbs ====
Glasgow University and Queen's Park received a bye to the fourth round.

22 October 1881	Petershill	2–2	Partick Thistle	Glasgow
				Stadium: Avenue Park

22 October 1881	Rangers	3–1	Alexandra Athletic	Kinning Park
	Hill; Pringle (x2)			Stadium: Kinning Park; Attendance: 3,000

22 October 1881	Northern	1–2	Clyde	Glasgow
				Stadium: Hyde Park

22 October 1881	Partick	1–2 (Void)	South Western	Partick
				Stadium: Inchview

==== Renfrewshire district ====
Thornliebank received a bye to the fourth round.

29 October 1881	Kilbarchan	2–1 (Void)	Johnstone	Kilbarchan
				Stadium: Whitlands

29 October 1881	Glenkilloch	0–3	Cartvale	Neilston
				Stadium: Butterwell Park

29 October 1881	Arthurlie	7–1	Paisley Athletic	Barrhead
				Stadium: Arthurlie Cross

==== Lanarkshire district ====
Thistle received a bye to the fourth round.

22 October 1881	Cambuslang	4–2 (Void)	West Benhar	Cambuslang
				Stadium: Bogleshole

29 October 1881	Airdrie	4–4	Shotts	Airdrie
				Stadium: Rochsoles

==== Ayrshire district ====
Kilmarnock Athletic received a bye to the fourth round.

22 October 1881	Kilmarnock	2–0	Kilbirnie	Kilmarnock
	Wallace; Hay			Stadium: Rugby Park

22 October 1881	Hurlford	0–0	Mauchline	Hurlford
				Stadium: Struthens Park

22 October 1881	Lugar Boswell	0–1	Beith	Lugar
				Stadium: Thomerson Field

==== Stirlingshire district ====
Milton of Campsie received a bye to the fourth round.

22 October 1881	Thistle Athletic	0–2	Falkirk	Milngavie
				Stadium: Drumclog Park

==== Dunbartonshire district ====
Helensburgh received a bye to the fourth round.

22 October 1881	Dumbarton	5–0	Jamestown	Dumbarton
	Watt; Miller; Brown (x2)			Stadium: Boghead Park; Attendance: 3,000

==== Edinburgh district ====
Edinburgh University and Hibernian received a bye to the fourth round.

22 October 1881	West Calder	4–1	Brunswick	West Calder
				Stadium: Burngrange Park

==== Perthshire district ====
22 October 1881	Rob Roy	1–6	Vale of Teith	Callander
				Stadium: Garmhor Park

==== Forfarshire district ====
29 October 1881	Strathmore	1–4	Dundee Our Boys	Dundee
				Stadium: Rollo's Pier

==== Dumfriesshire district ====
29 October 1881	Stranraer	4–1	Queen of the South Wanderers	Stranraer
				Stadium: Rephad

=== Replays ===
==== Glasgow and Suburbs ====
29 October 1881	Partick Thistle	2–0 (Void)	Petershill	Partick
				Stadium: Jordanvale Park

5 November 1881	South Western	1–0	Partick	Govan
				Stadium: Copeland Park

==== Renfrewshire district ====
5 November 1881	Kilbarchan	2–2 (a.e.t.)	Johnstone	Kilbarchan
				Stadium: Whitlands

==== Lanarkshire district ====
5 November 1881	Shotts	5–0	Airdrie	Shotts
				Stadium: Springhill Farm

5 November 1881	West Benhar	3–2	Cambuslang	Harthill
				Stadium: Harthill Mains

==== Ayrshire district ====
29 October 1881	Mauchline	2–0	Hurlford	Mauchline
				Stadium: Connel Park

=== Second replays ===
==== Glasgow and Suburbs ====
5 November 1881	Partick Thistle	3–2 (a.e.t.)	Petershill	Partick
				Stadium: Jordanvale Park

==== Renfrewshire district ====
12 November 1881	Johnstone	3–0	Kilbarchan	Johnstone
				Stadium: Cartland Bank

Notes

1. H-Match declared as a draw following a protest by Partick and a replay was ordered.
2. I-A protest by Johnstone that the spectators encroached onto the field was upheld and a replay was ordered.
3. J-A protest by West Benhar that the spectators encroached onto the field was upheld and a replay was ordered.
4. K-Abandoned after 70 minutes when Kilbirnie left the field in protest over a disputed goal. The result was allowed to stand and Kilmarnock advanced to the fourth round.
5. L-Abandoned after 83 minutes when Queen of the South Wanderers left the field in protest over a disputed goal. The result was allowed to stand and Stranraer advanced to the fourth round.
6. M-A protest by Petershill that the enclosure was "not properly kept" and that horses broke in and stopped play was upheld and a second replay was ordered.
7. N-Abandoned at half time when Partick left the field in protest over a disputed goal. The result was allowed to stand and South Western advanced to the fourth round.

== Fourth round ==
Beith, Dumbarton, Shotts, South Western and Vale of Teith received a bye to the fifth round.

=== Matches ===
12 November 1881	Falkirk	3–1	Milton of Campsie	Falkirk
				Stadium: Blinkbonny Park

12 November 1881	Helensburgh	1–1	Arthurlie	Helensburgh
				Stadium: Kirkmichael Park

12 November 1881	Thornliebank	0–2	Rangers	Thornliebank
			Hill; Own goal	Stadium: Deacon's Bank Park

12 November 1881	Edinburgh University	2–3	Clyde	Edinburgh
				Stadium: Craiglockart

12 November 1881	Mauchline	2–3	Kilmarnock Athletic	Mauchline
				Stadium: Connel Park

12 November 1881	Thistle	0–1	Partick Thistle	Lanark

19 November 1881	Queen's Park	3–1	Johnstone	Crosshill
				Stadium: Hampden Park

19 November 1881	Glasgow University	4–5	Cartvale	Glasgow
				Stadium: Gilmorehill

19 November 1881	West Benhar	4–4	Hibernian	Harthill
				Stadium: Harthill Mains

19 November 1881	Kilmarnock	9–2	Dundee Our Boys	Kilmarnock
				Stadium: Rugby Park

West Calder	w/o	Stranraer

=== Replays ===
19 November 1881	Arthurlie	1–0	Helensburgh	Barrhead
				Stadium: Arthurlie Cross

26 November 1881	Hibernian	8–0	West Benhar	Edinburgh
				Stadium: Hibernian Park

== Fifth round ==
=== Matches ===
3 December 1881	Queen's Park	10–0	Partick Thistle	Crosshill
				Stadium: Hampden Park

3 December 1881	Vale of Teith	0–5	Shotts	Doune
				Stadium: Tullochan Knowe

3 December 1881	Kilmarnock Athletic	2–0	Beith	Kilmarnock
				Stadium: Holm Quarry

3 December 1881	Clyde	4–5	Cartvale	Glasgow
				Stadium: Barrowfield Park

3 December 1881	Hibernian	2–6 (Void)	Dumbarton	Edinburgh
	Rourke; Byrne			Stadium: Hibernian Park; Attendance: 4,000

3 December 1881	South Western	1–2 (Void)	Rangers	Govan
			Inglis; McFarlane	Stadium: Copeland Park; Attendance: 3,000

10 December 1881	Arthurlie	4–1	Kilmarnock	Barrhead
			Hamilton	Stadium: Arthurlie Cross; Attendance: 2,000

10 December 1881	West Calder	4–2	Falkirk	West Calder
				Stadium: Burngrange Park

=== Replays ===
24 December 1881	Hibernian	2–6	Dumbarton	Edinburgh
			Hutcheson; McAuley; Lindsay; Brown; Meikleham (x2)	Stadium: Hibernian Park; Attendance: 4,000

24 December 1881	Rangers	4–0	South Western	Kinning Park
	Hill; Inglis; Christie; McFarlane			Stadium: Kinning Park; Attendance: 1,000

Notes

1. O-A protest by Hibernian regarding the impartiality of the referee and umpires was upheld and a replay was ordered.
2. P-A protest by South Western regarding a disputed goal was upheld and a replay was ordered.

== Quarter-finals ==
=== Matches ===
31 December 1881	West Calder	3–5	Cartvale	West Calder
				Stadium: Burngrange Park

7 January 1882	Queen's Park	15–0	Shotts	Crosshill
				Stadium: Hampden Park

14 January 1882	Kilmarnock Athletic	5–2	Arthurlie	Kilmarnock
				Stadium: Holm Quarry

28 January 1882	Dumbarton	2–1 (Void)	Rangers	Dumbarton
			Pringle 80'	Stadium: Boghead Park; Attendance: 5,000

=== Replay ===
4 February 1882	Dumbarton	5–1	Rangers	Dumbarton
	McKinnon; Lindsay (x2); Miller; Brown		Hill	Stadium: Boghead Park; Attendance: 5,000

Notes

1. Q-A protest by Rangers that the referee had called time five minutes early was upheld and a replay was ordered.

== Semi-finals ==
=== Matches ===
18 February 1882	Queen's Park	3–2	Kilmarnock Athletic	Crosshill
				Stadium: Hampden Park

18 February 1882	Dumbarton	11–2	Cartvale	Dumbarton
	McAuley; Meikleham (x3); Brown; Lindsay (x4); Kennedy; Own goal			Stadium: Boghead Park

== Final ==
=== Original match ===
18 March 1882
15:00

Queen's Park	2–2	Dumbarton
Harrower (x2)		Brown; Meikleham

Cathkin Park, Crosshill
Attendance: 12,000

=== Replay ===
1 April 1882
15:00

Queen's Park	4–1	Dumbarton
Ker; Harrower; Richmond; Kay		Miller

Cathkin Park, Crosshill
Attendance: 15,000

== See also ==
- 1881–82 in Scottish football
