= 1880–81 Scottish Cup =

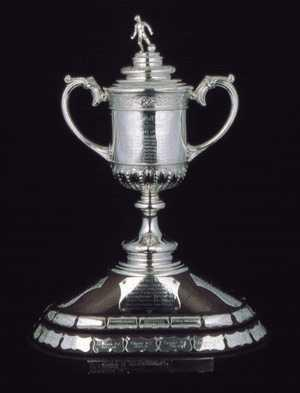
- The Scottish Cup trophy

Tournament details
- Country: Scotland
- Teams: 136

Final positions
- Champions: Queen's Park (fifth title)
- Runners-up: Dumbarton

Tournament statistics
- Matches played: 121
- Goals scored: 554 (4.58 per match)

The 1880–81 Scottish Cup – officially the Scottish Football Association Challenge Cup – was the eighth season of Scotland's most prestigious football knockout competition. Defending champions Queen's Park retained the cup and won the competition for the fifth time after they beat Dumbarton 3–1 in a replayed final which saw Dr John Smith score the first Scottish Cup final hat-trick on 9 April 1881.

== Calendar ==
As with the previous competitions, the eighth edition of the Scottish Cup took on the format of a traditional knockout tournament. For the earlier rounds, the names of competing teams were placed into lots according to their districts and drawn into pairs. The home team for each tie was determined by the toss of a coin unless it was mutually agreed or only one of the two clubs drawn against one another had a private ground. In the event of a draw, the team who lost the toss would have the choice of ground for the replay. A similar procedure was used for subsequent rounds, except that any club which had received a bye in the previous round would first be drawn against one of the winners of the previous round. The names of winning teams were placed into one lot for later rounds. The choice of venue for the final matches was reserved to the Scottish Football Association.

Round	First match date	Fixtures			Clubs
Round	First match date	Original	Byes	Replays	Clubs
First Round	4 September 1880	65	6	3	136 → 71
Second Round	2 October 1880	33	5	5	71 → 38
Third Round	23 October 1880	17	4	1	38 → 21
Fourth Round	13 November 1880	10	1	1	21 → 11
Fifth Round	4 December 1880	5	1	0	11 → 6
Quarter-finals	25 December 1880	3	0	0	6 → 3
Semi-finals	5 February 1881	1	1	0	3 → 2
Final	26 March 1881	1	0	1	2 → 1

- Both Glasgow and Edinburgh Universities were given byes to the third round.

== Teams ==
All 136 teams entered the competition in the first round.

Ayrshire	Glasgow and Suburbs		Lanarkshire	Renfrewshire
Auchinleck Boswell; Ayr; Ayr Thistle; Beith; Catrine; Coylton Coila; Cumnock; Dean; Girvan; Hurlford; Irvine; Kilbirnie; Kilmarnock; Kilmarnock Athletic; Kilmarnock Portland; Lanemark; Mauchline; Maybole; Rankinston; Stewarton Cunninghame	Ailsa; Alexandra Athletic; Athole; Caledonian; City; Clyde; Clydesdale; Cowlairs; Dennistoun; Glasgow University; Govan; Harmonic; High School; Ingram; John Elder; Jordanhill; Kelvinbank; Lancefield	Maxwell; Northern; Oxford; Partick; Partick Thistle; Petershill; Pilgrims; Pollokshields Athletic; Possil Bluebell; Possilpark; Queen's Park; Rangers; Shawlands Athletic; South Western; Whitefield; Windsor; 3rd Lanark RV; 19th Lanark RV	Airdrie; Airdrie Bluebell; Airdriehill; Bellshill; Cambuslang; Clarkston; Drumpellier; Excelsior; Glengowan; Hamilton Academical; Lanark; Plains Blue Bell; Royal Albert; Shotts; Stonelaw; Thistle; Tollcross Athletic; Uddingston; Upper Clydesdale	Abercorn; Arthurlie; Barrhead; Cartside; Cartvale; Glenkilloch; Johnstone; Johnstone Athletic; Johnstone Rovers; Kennishead; Levern; Morton; Netherlee; Oakfield; Pollok; Renfrew; Renfrew Ramblers; St Mirren; Thornliebank; Wellington Park; Yoker; 17th Renfrew RV
Dunbartonshire	Edinburghshire and Fifeshire	Perthshire and Forfarshire	Stirlingshire	Wigtownshire and Dumfriesshire
Alclutha; Dumbarton; Helensburgh; Jamestown; Kilmaronock Thistle; Kirkintilloch Athletic; Lennox; Renton; Star of Leven; Vale of Leven; Victoria	Brunswick; Dunfermline; Edinburgh University; Hanover; Heart of Midlothian; Hibernian	Arbroath; Coupar Angus; Dunkeld; Dundee Our Boys; Rob Roy; St Clement's; Strathmore; Vale of Teith	Bridge of Allan; Campsie Athletic; Central; Falkirk; Grasshoppers; King's Park; Lenzie; Milton of Campsie; Strathblane; Thistle Athletic	Cree Rovers; Queen of the South Wanderers; Stranraer; 5th Kirkcudbrightshire RV

Notes

1. I-There is no record of a club called Airdrie Bluebell that existed in the 1880s. It is believed it was erroneously included in the hat alongside a number of clubs which had disbanded before the first round draw as a result of confusion with Plains Blue Bell - the latter club had been referred to as an Airdrie side in the 1879–80 Minute Book.

== First round ==
=== Matches ===
==== Glasgow and Suburbs ====
Possil Bluebell received a bye to the second round. Glasgow University received a bye to the third round.

4 September 1880	Petershill	3–4	Cowlairs	Glasgow
				Stadium: Avenue Park

11 September 1880	Queen's Park	7–0	John Elder	Crosshill
				Stadium: Hampden Park

11 September 1880	Athole	1–1 (Void)	Whitefield	Partick
				Stadium: Merkland Park

11 September 1880	Northern	3–1	3rd Lanark RV	Glasgow
				Stadium: Hyde Park

11 September 1880	Jordanhill	1–0	Windsor	Glasgow
				Stadium: Anniesland Park

11 September 1880	Oxford	6–0	Maxwell	Crosshill
				Stadium: Bellevue Park

11 September 1880	Pollokshields Athletic	0–4	Partick	Pollokshields
				Stadium: Pollok Park

11 September 1880	South Western	7–0	Ingram	Govan
				Stadium: Copeland Park

11 September 1880	Rangers	4–1	Govan	Kinning Park
				Stadium: Kinning Park

18 September 1880	Caledonian	1–2	Clyde	Glasgow
				Stadium: Kelvinbridge Cricket Ground

18 September 1880	Pilgrims	4–2	Lancefield	Govan
				Stadium: Trinidad Park

18 September 1880	Alexandra Athletic	4–1	Kelvinbank	Glasgow
				Stadium: Kennyhill Park

Dennistoun	w/o	Partick Thistle

Possilpark	w/o	High School

City	w/o	19th Lanark RV

Ailsa	w/o	Harmonic

Clydesdale	w/o	Shawlands Athletic

==== Renfrewshire district ====
4 September 1880	Arthurlie	2–0	Johnstone	Barrhead
				Stadium: Arthurlie Cross

4 September 1880	St Mirren	3–0	Johnstone Athletic	Paisley
				Stadium: Thistle Park

4 September 1880	Pollok	5–0	Johnstone Rovers	Pollokshaws
				Stadium: Broom Park

11 September 1880	Glenkilloch	2–3	Morton	Neilston
				Stadium: Butterwell Park

18 September 1880	Cartside	6–2	Kennishead	Johnstone
				Stadium: Milliken Park

18 September 1880	Thornliebank	3–0	Renfrew	Thornliebank
				Stadium: Deacon's Bank Park

18 September 1880	Abercorn	7–1	Barrhead	Paisley
				Stadium: Blackstoun Park

18 September 1880	17th Renfrew RV	6–1	Wellington Park	Lochwinnoch
				Stadium: Barr Castle Park

Cartvale	w/o	Levern

Renfrew Ramblers	w/o	Yoker

Netherlee	w/o	Oakfield

==== Ayrshire district ====
11 September 1880	Rankinston	3–0 (Void)	Maybole	Rankinston
				Stadium: Long Row

11 September 1880	Beith	4–1	Irvine	Beith
				Stadium: Gateside Toll

11 September 1880	Catrine	0–2	Ayr	Catrine
				Stadium: Alexander Park

11 September 1880	Kilmarnock Portland	8–0	Coylton Coila	Kilmarnock
				Stadium: Hamilton Park

18 September 1880	Auchinleck Boswell	1–7	Cumnock	Auchinleck
				Stadium: Glenshamrock Park

18 September 1880	Kilbirnie	3–0	Lanemark	Kilbirnie
				Stadium: Stonyholm Park

Girvan	w/o	Kilmarnock Athletic

Hurlford	w/o	Ayr Thistle

Kilmarnock	w/o	Stewarton Cunninghame

Mauchline	w/o	Dean

==== Lanarkshire district ====
Glengowan received a bye to the second round.

4 September 1880	Clarkston	1–0	Plains Blue Bell	Airdrie
				Stadium: Blackrigg Farm

11 September 1880	Bellshill	0–3	Airdrie	Bellshill
				Stadium: Viewhill Park

11 September 1880	Excelsior	3–0	Drumpellier	Airdrie
				Stadium: Mavisbank Park

11 September 1880	Tollcross Athletic	0–5	Thistle	Shettleston
				Stadium: Mains Park

11 September 1880	Uddingston	2–2	Royal Albert	Uddingston
				Stadium: Mayfield

11 September 1880	Shotts	4–0	Lanark	Shotts
				Stadium: Stane Farm

Airdriehill	w/o	Airdrie Bluebell

Cambuslang	w/o	Upper Clydesdale

Stonelaw	w/o	Hamilton Academical

==== Dunbartonshire district ====
Vale of Leven received a bye to the second round.

11 September 1880	Lennox	1–2 (Void)	Helensburgh	Dumbarton
				Stadium: Levengrove Park

11 September 1880	Dumbarton	7–0	Victoria	Dumbarton
				Stadium: Boghead Park

11 September 1880	Jamestown	6–0	Alclutha	Jamestown
				Stadium: Balloch Road

18 September 1880	Star of Leven	3–2	Kirkintilloch Athletic	Alexandria
				Stadium: Bridge Street

Renton	w/o	Kilmaronock Thistle

==== Stirlingshire district ====
4 September 1880	Grasshoppers	1–2	Milton of Campsie	Bonnybridge
				Stadium: Seabegs

18 September 1880	King's Park	1–0	Strathblane	Stirling
				Stadium: Forthbank Park

18 September 1880	Central	2–0	Bridge of Allan	Lennoxtown
				Stadium: Slatefield Park

Lenzie	w/o	Thistle Athletic

Falkirk	w/o	Campsie Athletic

==== Perthshire and Forfarshire district ====
11 September 1880	Rob Roy	2–1	Dundee Our Boys	Callander
				Stadium: Garmhor Park

18 September 1880	Coupar Angus	4–1	Strathmore	Coupar Angus
				Stadium: Larghan Park

St Clement's	w/o	Dunkeld

Vale of Teith	w/o	Arbroath

==== Edinburghshire and Fifeshire ====
Hibernian received a bye to the second round. Edinburgh University received a bye to the third round.

11 September 1880	Heart of Midlothian	3–1	Brunswick	Edinburgh
				Stadium: Powderhall; Attendance: 550

18 September 1880	Hanover	3–5	Dunfermline	Edinburgh
				Stadium: Royal Gymnasium Ground

==== Wigtownshire and Dumfriesshire district ====
11 September 1880	Stranraer	3–0	Queen of the South Wanderers	Stranraer
				Stadium: Rephad

5th Kirkcudbrightshire RV	w/o	Cree Rovers

=== Replays ===
==== Glasgow and Suburbs ====
25 September 1880	Whitefield	1–2 (a.e.t.)	Athole	Govan
				Stadium: Ibrox Park

==== Ayrshire district ====
30 September 1880	Maybole	3–1	Rankinston	Ayr
				Stadium: Springvale Park

==== Lanarkshire district ====
18 September 1880	Royal Albert	5–0	Uddingston	Larkhall
				Stadium: Raploch Park

==== Dunbartonshire district ====
25 September 1880	Helensburgh	8–1	Lennox	Helensburgh
				Stadium: Kirkmichael Park

Notes

1. A-Replays were ordered for both the Lennox–Dumbarton and Athole–Whitefield ties after the original match was declared null and void owing to an irregularity in the appointment of a referee.
2. B-A protest from Maybole that the ground was not "roped in" was upheld and a replay was ordered.

== Second round ==
=== Matches ===
==== Glasgow and Suburbs ====
2 October 1880	Northern	0–1	Rangers	Glasgow
			Struthers 85'	Stadium: Hyde Park; Attendance: 3,000

2 October 1880	Alexandra Athletic	1–0	Athole	Glasgow
				Stadium: Kennyhill Park

2 October 1880	Jordanhill	0–1	Partick Thistle	Glasgow
				Stadium: Anniesland Park

2 October 1880	Queen's Park	5–0	Possilpark	Crosshill
				Stadium: Hampden Park

2 October 1880	Harmonic	1–1	Clyde	Glasgow
				Stadium: Onslow Park

9 October 1880	South Western	2–0	Partick	Govan
				Stadium: Copeland Park

9 October 1880	Pilgrims	7–0	City	Govan
				Stadium: Trinidad Park

9 October 1880	Cowlairs	4–3	Oxford	Glasgow
				Stadium: Gourlay Park

Possil Bluebell	w/o	Shawlands Athletic

==== Renfrewshire district ====
Cartside received a bye to the third round.

2 October 1880	Netherlee	0–2	Yoker	Netherlee
				Stadium: Netherlee Park

2 October 1880	St Mirren	3–2	17th Renfrew RV	Paisley
				Stadium: Thistle Park

2 October 1880	Abercorn	4–2	Morton	Paisley
				Stadium: Blackstoun Park

2 October 1880	Arthurlie	1–1	Cartvale	Barrhead
				Stadium: Arthurlie Cross

2 October 1880	Pollok	3–1	Thornliebank	Pollokshaws
				Stadium: Broom Park

==== Ayrshire district ====
2 October 1880	Hurlford	2–1	Cumnock	Hurlford
				Stadium: Struthens Park

2 October 1880	Kilbirnie	3–0 (Void)	Kilmarnock Athletic	Kilbirnie
				Stadium: Stonyholm Park

2 October 1880	Kilmarnock Portland	0–1	Beith	Kilmarnock
				Stadium: Hamilton Park

9 October 1880	Kilmarnock	6–3	Ayr	Kilmarnock
				Stadium: Rugby Park

9 October 1880	Mauchline	6–1	Maybole	Mauchline
				Stadium: Connel Park

==== Lanarkshire district ====
2 October 1880	Glengowan	1–1	Thistle	Caldercruix
				Stadium: Dumbreck Park

2 October 1880	Excelsior	2–3	Airdrie	Airdrie
				Stadium: Mavisbank Park

2 October 1880	Clarkston	2–1	Airdriehill	Airdrie
				Stadium: Blackrigg Farm

2 October 1880	Royal Albert	1–0	Shotts	Larkhall
				Stadium: Raploch Park

9 October 1880	Hamilton Academical	1–3	Cambuslang	Hamilton
				Stadium: South Haugh

==== Dunbartonshire ====
2 October 1880	Dumbarton	2–1	Jamestown	Dumbarton
	Lindsay (x2)			Stadium: Boghead Park

2 October 1880	Helensburgh	5–1	Star of Leven	Helensburgh
				Stadium: Kirkmichael Park

9 October 1880	Renton	0–1	Vale of Leven	Renton
				Stadium: Tontine Park

==== Stirlingshire district ====
Lenzie received a bye to the third round.

2 October 1880	Falkirk	2–1	King's Park	Falkirk
				Stadium: Blinkbonny Park

2 October 1880	Central	5–5	Milton of Campsie	Lennoxtown
				Stadium: Slatefield Park

==== Perthshire and Forfarshire district ====
2 October 1880	Dunkeld	0–4	Rob Roy	Dunkeld
				Stadium: Inver Road

2 October 1880	Coupar Angus	1–2	Arbroath	Coupar Angus
				Stadium: Larghan Park

==== Edinburgh district ====
Heart of Midlothian received a bye to the third round.

9 October 1880	Hibernian	3–1	Dunfermline	Edinburgh
	McFadyen; Quinn			Stadium: Hibernian Park

==== Kirkcudbrughtshire and Wigtownshire district ====
9 October 1880	5th Kirkcudbrightshire RV	4–3	Stranraer	Dumfries
				Stadium: Palmerston Park

=== Replays ===
==== Glasgow and Suburbs ====
9 October 1880	Clyde	1–0	Harmonic	Glasgow
				Stadium: Barrowfield Park

==== Renfrewshire district ====
9 October 1880	Cartvale	1–2	Arthurlie	Busby
				Stadium: Cartbridge Park

==== Ayrshire district ====
16 October 1880	Kilbirnie	2–1	Kilmarnock Athletic	Kilbirnie
				Stadium: Stonyholm Park

==== Lanarkshire district ====
9 October 1880	Thistle	6–1	Glengowan	Lanark

==== Stirlingshire district ====
9 October 1880	Milton of Campsie	1–3	Central	Milton of Campsie
				Stadium: Brassburn Park

Notes

1. C-Abandoned after 55 minutes when Kilmarnock Athletic left the field in protest at a disallowed goal. The match was declared null and void and a replay was ordered.

== Third round ==
=== Matches ===
==== Glasgow and Suburbs ====
Glasgow University and South Western received a bye to the fourth round.

23 October 1880	Cowlairs	2–1 (Void)	Alexandra Athletic	Glasgow
				Stadium: Gourlay Park

23 October 1880	Rangers	3–0	Partick Thistle	Kinning Park
	Angus (x3)			Stadium: Kinning Park; Attendance: 1,000

23 October 1880	Clyde	4–0	Shawlands Athletic	Glasgow
				Stadium: Barrowfield Park

23 October 1880	Queen's Park	8–1	Pilgrims	Crosshill
				Stadium: Hampden Park

==== Renfrewshire district ====
30 October 1880	Cartside	4–3	Yoker	Johnstone
				Stadium: Milliken Park

23 October 1880	Abercorn	1–4	St Mirren	Paisley
				Stadium: Blackstoun Park

23 October 1880	Arthurlie	2–0	Pollok	Barrhead
				Stadium: Arthurlie Cross

==== Ayrshire and Kirkcudbrightshire district ====
23 October 1880	Beith	17–2	5th Kirkcudbrightshire RV	Beith
				Stadium: Gateside Toll

23 October 1880	Mauchline	2–1 (Void)	Kilmarnock	Mauchline
				Stadium: Connel Park

23 October 1880	Kilbirnie	0–2	Hurlford	Kilbirnie
				Stadium: Stonyholm Park

==== Lanarkshire district ====
Clarkston received a bye to the fourth round.

23 October 1880	Royal Albert	0–5	Cambuslang	Larkhall
				Stadium: Raploch Park

Thistle	w/o	Airdrie

==== Dunbartonshire and Stirlingshire district ====
23 October 1880	Helensburgh	1–4	Vale of Leven	Helensburgh
				Stadium: Kirkmichael Park

23 October 1880	Falkirk	1–6	Dumbarton	Falkirk
				Stadium: Blinkbonny Park

30 October 1880	Central	6–1	Lenzie	Lennoxtown
				Stadium: Slatefield Park

==== Perthshire, Forfarshire and Edinburgh district ====
Edinburgh University received a bye to the fourth round.

6 November 1880	Arbroath	2–1	Rob Roy	Arbroath
				Stadium: Gayfield Park

23 October 1880	Heart of Midlothian	5–3	Hibernian	Edinburgh
	A. McNeil (x2); Edwards; Alexander; J. McNeil		Scrimmage (x2)	Stadium: Powderhall; Attendance: 5,000

=== Replays ===
==== Glasgow and Suburbs ====
6 November 1880	Cowlairs	2–1	Alexandra Athletic	Glasgow
				Stadium: Gourlay Park

==== Renfrewshire district ====
6 November 1880	Yoker	2–2	Cartside	Yoker
				Stadium: Holm Park

==== Ayrshire and Kirkcudbrightshire district ====
6 November 1880	Mauchline	3–3	Kilmarnock	Mauchline
				Stadium: Connel Park

=== Second replays ===
==== Renfrewshire district ====
13 November 1880	Cartside	4–3	Yoker	Johnstone
				Stadium: Milliken Park

==== Ayrshire and Kirkcudbrightshire district ====
13 November 1880	Kilmarnock	0–3	Mauchline	Kilmarnock
				Stadium: Rugby Park; Attendance: 1,000

Notes

1. D-A protest by Alexandra Athletic that Cowlairs had fielded an ineligible player was upheld and a replay was ordered.
2. E-Match declared as a draw following a protest by Yoker and a replay was ordered.
3. F-A protest by Kilmarnock was upheld and a replay was ordered.
4. G-Abandoned after 60 minutes due to darkness.

== Fourth round ==
Thistle received a bye to the fifth round.

=== Matches ===
13 November 1880	Heart of Midlothian	3–0	Cambuslang	Edinburgh
	Alexander (x2); Edwards			Stadium: Powderhall

13 November 1880	Edinburgh University	0–1	Central	Edinburgh
				Stadium: Craiglockart

13 November 1880	Arthurlie	4–3 (Void)	South Western	Barrhead
				Stadium: Arthurlie Cross

13 November 1880	Dumbarton	9–0	Glasgow University	Dumbarton
	McKinnon (x2); Kennedy; Lindsay; Meikleham; Own goal (x2)			Stadium: Boghead Park

13 November 1880	Rangers	11–0	Clyde	Kinning Park
	Steel; Angus; Struthers; Pringle			Stadium: Kinning Park

13 November 1880	Queen's Park	11–2	Beith	Crosshill
				Stadium: Hampden Park

13 November 1880	St Mirren	1–0	Cowlairs	Paisley
				Stadium: Thistle Park

20 November 1880	Cartside	1–3	Hurlford	Johnstone
				Stadium: Milliken Park

Mauchline	w/o	Clarkston

Vale of Leven	w/o	Arbroath

=== Replay ===
27 November 1880	Arthurlie	2–1 (a.e.t.)	South Western	Barrhead
				Stadium: Arthurlie Cross

Notes

1. H-A protest by South Western was upheld and a replay was ordered.

== Fifth round ==
Central received a bye to the quarter-finals.

=== Matches ===
4 December 1880	Vale of Leven	7–1	Thistle	Alexandria
				Stadium: North Street Park

4 December 1880	St Mirren	1–5	Dumbarton	Paisley
				Stadium: Thistle Park

11 December 1880	Arthurlie	4–0	Heart of Midlothian	Barrhead
				Stadium: Arthurlie Cross

11 December 1880	Mauchline	0–2	Queen's Park	Mauchline
				Stadium: Connel Park

18 December 1880	Hurlford	0–3	Rangers	Hurlford
			Angus; Christie; McNeil	Stadium: Struthens Park

== Quarter-finals ==
=== Matches ===
25 December 1880	Central	1–10	Queen's Park	Lennoxtown
				Stadium: Slatefield Park

25 December 1880	Rangers	1–3	Dumbarton	Kinning Park
	Pringle 55'		McKinnon; Lindsay; Meikleham	Stadium: Kinning Park; Attendance: 4,500

25 December 1880	Arthurlie	0–2	Vale of Leven	Barrhead
				Stadium: Arthurlie Cross

== Semi-finals ==
Queen's Park received a bye to the final.

=== Match ===
5 February 1881	Vale of Leven	0–2	Dumbarton	Alexandria
			Kennedy; Lindsay	Stadium: North Street Park; Attendance: 8,000

== Final ==
=== Original match ===
26 March 1881
15:00

Queen's Park	2–1 (Void)	Dumbarton
Kay (x2)		Brown

Kinning Park sports ground, Kinning Park
Attendance: 15,000

=== Replay ===
9 April 1881
15:00

Queen's Park	3–1	Dumbarton
Smith (x3)		Meikleham

Kinning Park sports ground, Kinning Park
Attendance: 10,000

== See also ==
- 1880–81 in Scottish football
