= 1879–80 Scottish Cup =

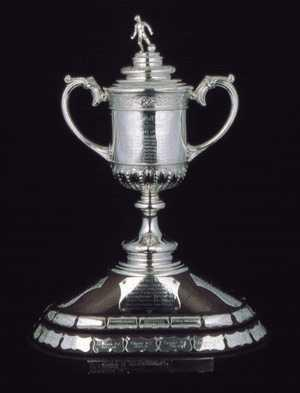
- The Scottish Cup trophy

Tournament details
- Country: Scotland
- Teams: 142

Final positions
- Champions: Queen's Park (fourth title)
- Runners-up: Thornliebank

Tournament statistics
- Matches played: 137
- Goals scored: 605 (4.42 per match)

The 1879–80 Scottish Cup – officially the Scottish Football Association Challenge Cup – was the seventh season of Scotland's most prestigious football knockout competition. With 142 entrants, this season saw the largest number of teams to compete for the trophy since its inception. Three-time defending champions Vale of Leven lost their first match in the competition for four seasons when they were knocked out in the first round, losing 4–3 to rivals Dumbarton. Queen's Park regained the trophy as they won the competition for the fourth time after beating Thornliebank 3–0 in the final on 21 February 1880.

== Format ==
As with the previous competitions, the seventh edition of the Scottish Cup took on the format of a traditional knockout tournament. For the earlier rounds, the names of competing teams were placed into lots according to their districts and drawn into pairs. The home team for each tie was determined by the toss of a coin unless it was mutually agreed or only one of the two clubs drawn against one another had a private ground. In the event of a draw, the team who lost the toss would have the choice of ground for the replay. A similar procedure was used for subsequent rounds however, any club which had received a bye in the previous round would first be drawn against one of the winners of the previous round. The names of winning teams were placed into one lot for later rounds. The choice of venue for the final matches was reserved to the Scottish Football Association.

=== Calendar ===
Round	First match date	Fixtures			Clubs
Round	First match date	Original	Byes	Replays	Clubs
First Round	6 September 1879	65	13	7	142 → 81
Second Round	4 October 1879	38	5	5	81 → 44
Third Round	1 November 1879	22	1	2	44 → 22
Fourth Round	22 November 1879	11	0	2	22 → 13
Fifth Round	20 December 1879	6	1	1	13 → 7
Quarter-finals	3 January 1880	3	1	1	7 → 4
Semi-finals	17 January 1880	2	0	0	4 → 2
Final	21 February 1880	1	0	0	2 → 1

- Both Glasgow and Edinburgh University were given byes to the third round.
- Two teams qualified for the second round after drawing their first round replay.
- Two teams qualified for the third round after drawing their second round replay.
- Four teams qualified for the fifth round after drawing their fourth round replay.
- Star of Leven, Kirkintilloch Athletic and Lennox were reinstated after Jamestown were disqualified.

== Teams ==
Of the 143 entrants, 135 entered the competition in the first round. The remaining eight sides – namely Barrhead Rangers, Bellshill, Cartside, Dennistoun, High School, Plains Blue Bell, Stewarton Cunninghame and Strathmore – were admitted into the competition in the second round.

Ayrshire	Dunbartonshire	Glasgow and Suburbs		Lanarkshire	Renfrewshire
Auchinleck Boswell; Ayr; Ayr Academicals; Beith; Catrine; Cumnock; Dean; Girvan; Hurlford; Irvine; Kilbirnie; Kilmarnock; Kilmarnock Athletic; Kilmarnock Portland; Lanemark; Mauchline; Maybole Carrick; Maybole Ladywell; Stewarton Cunninghame; Tarbolton Burntonians	Alclutha; Dumbarton; Jamestown; Helensburgh; Kilmaronock Thistle; Kirkintilloch Athletic; Lennox; Renton; Renton Thistle; Star of Leven; Vale of Leven	Ailsa; Albatross; Alexandra Athletic; Athole; Blackfriars; Blythswood; Burnside; Caledonian; City; Clyde; Clydesdale; Dennistoun; Derby; Glasgow University; Govan; Govanhill Lacrosse; Harmonic Good Templars; Havelock; High School; John Elder; Jordanhill; Kelvinbank; Northern	Oxford; Parkgrove; Partick; Petershill; Pollokshields Athletic; Possil Bluebell; Possilpark; Queen's Park; Rangers; Rosslyn; South Western; Stonefield; Telegraphists; Thistle; Union; Wellpark; Whitefield; Whiteinch; 1st Lanark RV; 3rd Lanark RV; 4th Renfrew RV; 19th Lanark RV	Airdrie; Avondale; Bellshill; Cambuslang; Clarkston; Clydebank; Drumpellier; East Kilbride; Excelsior; Glengowan; Hamilton Academical; Mount Vernon; Newmains; Plains Blue Bell; Shotts; Stonelaw; Uddingston; Upper Clydesdale	Arthurlie; Barrhead; Barrhead Rangers; Busby; Cartside; Cartvale; Glenkilloch; Johnstone Athletic; Kennishead; Levern; Morton; Netherlee; Port Glasgow; Renfrew; Renfrew Ramblers; Thornliebank; Wellington Park; Yoker; 17th Renfrew RV; 23rd Renfrew RV
Dumfriesshire	Edinburgh and East	Forfarshire	Perthshire	Stirlingshire	Wigtownshire
Annan Wanderers; Queen of the South Wanderers	Brunswick; Dunfermline; Edinburgh Thistle; Edinburgh University; Hanover; Heart of Midlothian; Hibernian; Swifts; 3rd Edinburgh RV	Arbroath; Dundee Our Boys; St Clement's; Strathmore	Clifton & Strathfillan; Coupar Angus; Rob Roy; Vale of Teith	Campsie Glen; Falkirk; Grasshoppers; King's Park; Lenzie; Milton of Campsie; Strathblane; Thistle Athletic	Cree Rovers; Stranraer

== First round ==
Although 142 teams were entered in the competition, it was not uncommon for clubs to merge or fold without the Scottish Football Association being notified so they were still included in the draw for the cup. As a result, 25 teams were given walkovers into the second round. They joined Kirkintilloch Athletic, St Clement's and Tarbolton Burntonians who received a bye to the second round. Glasgow University and Edinburgh University received a bye to the third round.

The first round got underway on 6 September 1879 when Beith drew with Kilbirnie. Both teams would advance to the second round after they drew their replay on 27 September and the Scottish Football Association decided to allow them both into the draw. The majority of the ties were played two weeks later. Defending champions Vale of Leven were handed a tough draw away to rivals Dumbarton. It would be the first time the defending champions failed to make it past the first hurdle as a brace from Joseph Lindsay helped Dumbarton to a 4–3 win in their first competitive match at Boghead Park. Queen's Park and Rangers played out a goalless draw in front of 7,000 spectators at Kinning Park to set up a replay a week later while Kilmarnock Athletic defeated Ayr 6–0, Thornliebank won 4–0 at home to Yoker, Netherlee and Morton drew 0–0 and Renton were held to a 2–2 draw by Kilmarnock Thistle. In the replays on 27 September, Queen's Park exacted revenge for the previous season's defeat as they trounced Rangers 5–1 at Hampden Park, Morton and Netherlee shared 11 goals as the former advanced 7–4 at Cappielow and Renton recorded the biggest win of the round, defeating Kilmaronock Thistle 8–0 away from home.

Jamestown had defeated Star of Leven 2–1 on 20 September but would later be disqualified from the competition after the referee for their second round match against Kirkintilloch Athletic was found to be a member of the club. Star of Leven would be reinstated in the fourth round to play Kirkintilloch Athletic. The round concluded when Campsie Glen defeated Thistle Athletic 4–0 on 4 October after they had been ordered to replay the original match, which Campsie Glen also won, two weeks earlier.

=== Matches ===
==== Glasgow and Suburbs ====
20 September 1879	Jordanhill	2–1	Kelvinbank	Glasgow
				Stadium: Anniesland Park

20 September 1879	Rangers	0–0	Queen's Park	Kinning Park
				Stadium: Kinning Park; Attendance: 7,000

20 September 1879	Govan	2–1	Caledonian	Govan
				Stadium: Moore Park

20 September 1879	City	0–0	Possilpark	Glasgow

20 September 1879	Pollokshields Athletic	2–2	Oxford	Pollokshields
				Stadium: Pollok Park

20 September 1879	Alexandra Athletic	4–0	Albatross	Glasgow
				Stadium: Kennyhill Park

20 September 1879	Northern	3–0	Thistle	Glasgow
				Stadium: Hyde Park

27 September 1879	Partick	2–0	Petershill	Partick
				Stadium: Inchview

27 September 1879	Whitefield	7–0	Govanhill Lacrosse	Govan
				Stadium: Whitefield Park

Havelock	w/o	4th Renfrew RV

Union	w/o	3rd Lanark RV

John Elder	w/o	Derby

Parkgrove	w/o	Clydesdale

Whiteinch	w/o	South Western

Stonefield	w/o	Harmonic Good Templars

Telegraphists	w/o	Possil Bluebell

Athole	w/o	Blythswood

Wellpark	w/o	19th Lanark RV

1st Lanark RV	w/o	Clyde

Burnside	w/o	Ailsa

Blackfriars	w/o	Rosslyn

==== Dunbartonshire district ====
20 September 1879	Dumbarton	4–3	Vale of Leven	Dumbarton
	Lindsay (x2); Own goal			Stadium: Boghead Park

20 September 1879	Helensburgh	4–2	Alclutha	Helensburgh
				Stadium: Kirkmichael Park

20 September 1879	Jamestown	2–1	Star of Leven	Jamestown
				Stadium: Balloch Road

20 September 1879	Renton	2–2	Kilmaronock Thistle	Renton
				Stadium: Tontine Park

Lennox	w/o	Renton Thistle

==== Lanarkshire district ====
20 September 1879	Clarkston	2–1	Stonelaw	Airdrie
				Stadium: Brownieside Park

20 September 1879	Clydebank	1–2	Excelsior	Rutherglen
				Stadium: Phoenix Park

20 September 1879	East Kilbride	0–1	Airdrie	East Kilbride
				Stadium: Kirktonholm

20 September 1879	Hamilton Academical	2–0	Glengowan	Hamilton
				Stadium: South Haugh

27 September 1879	Shotts	2–1	Drumpellier	Shotts
				Stadium: Stane Farm

Uddingston	w/o	Cambuslang

Mount Vernon	w/o	Upper Clydesdale

Avondale	w/o	Newmains

==== Edinburgh and East ====
20 September 1879	Hibernian	5–1	Hanover	Edinburgh
	Cox; Donnelly (x3); Lee			Stadium: Mayfield

20 September 1879	Brunswick	5–0	Swifts	Edinburgh
				Stadium: Brunswick Park

20 September 1879	Dunfermline	2–0	Edinburgh Thistle	Dunfermline
				Stadium: Ladysmill

Heart of Midlothian	w/o	3rd Edinburgh RV

==== Ayrshire district ====
6 September 1879	Beith	2–2	Kilbirnie	Beith
				Stadium: Gateside Toll

20 September 1879	Ayr	0–6	Kilmarnock Athletic	Ayr
				Stadium: Springvale Park

20 September 1879	Dean	1–3	Mauchline	Kilmarnock
				Stadium: Hillhead

27 September 1879	Catrine	0–2	Hurlford	Catrine
				Stadium: Burn Park

27 September 1879	Auchinleck Boswell	0–2	Maybole Ladywell	Auchinleck
				Stadium: Glenshamrock Park

Cumnock	w/o	Irvine

Maybole Carrick	w/o	Girvan

Lanemark	w/o	Kilmarnock Portland

Kilmarnock	w/o	Ayr Academicals

==== Renfrewshire district ====
20 September 1879	Cartvale	5–2	Wellington Park	Busby
			Overlee Park

20 September 1879	Barrhead	0–5	Renfrew	Barrhead
				Stadium: Beacon's Field

20 September 1879	Netherlee	0–0	Morton	Netherlee

20 September 1879	17th Renfrew RV	4–1	Levern	Lochwinnoch
				Stadium: Barr Castle Park

20 September 1879	Kennishead	2–1	Glenkilloch	Thornliebank

20 September 1879	Thornliebank	4–0	Yoker	Thornliebank
				Stadium: Deacon's Bank

27 September 1879	Busby	0–3	Arthurlie	Busby
				Stadium: Cartsbridge Park

23rd Renfrew RV	w/o	Renfrew Ramblers

Port Glasgow	w/o	Johnstone Athletic

==== Stirlingshire district ====
20 September 1879	Milton of Campsie	3–1	King's Park	Milton of Campsie
				Stadium: Brassburn Park

20 September 1879	Campsie Glen	4–1 (Void)	Thistle Athletic	Lennoxtown
				Stadium: Lennox Park

27 September 1879	Strathblane	1–0	Lenzie	Blanefield
				Stadium: Cuilt Park

27 September 1879	Falkirk	4–2	Grasshoppers	Falkirk
				Stadium: Randyford Park

==== Perthshire district ====
27 September 1879	Coupar Angus	1–2	Rob Roy	Coupar Angus
				Stadium: Larghan Park

Vale of Teith	w/o	Clifton & Strathfillan

==== Forfarshire district ====
20 September 1879	Arbroath	5–1	Dundee Our Boys	Arbroath
				Stadium: Hospitalfield

==== Dumfriesshire district ====
Queen of the South Wanderers	w/o	Annan

==== Wigtownshire district ====
20 September 1879	Cree Rovers	0–2	Stranraer	Newton Stewart
				Stadium: Barn Park

=== Replays ===
==== Glasgow and Suburbs ====
27 September 1879	Queen's Park	5–1	Rangers	Crosshill
			Steel	Stadium: Hampden Park; Attendance: 5,000

27 September 1879	Possilpark	3–1	City	Possilpark
				Stadium: Saracen Park

27 September 1879	Oxford	0–4	Pollokshields Athletic	Crosshill
				Stadium: Bellevue Park

==== Dunbartonshire district ====
27 September 1879	Kilmaronock Thistle	0–8	Renton	Gartocharn
				Stadium: Ross Lane Park

==== Ayrshire district ====
27 September 1879	Kilbirnie	2–2	Beith	Kilbirnie
				Stadium: Stonyholm Park

==== Renfrewshire district ====
27 September 1879	Morton	7–4	Netherlee	Greenock
				Stadium: Cappielow

==== Stirlingshire district ====
4 October 1879	Campsie Glen	4–0	Thistle Athletic	Glasgow
				Stadium: Kennyhill Park

Notes

1. A-Jamestown were disqualified following their third round match with Lennox. Their opponents from the first and second round – Star of Leven and Kirkintilloch Athletic – were reinstated and played a match to determine who would play Lennox. These matches are all considered part of the fourth round.
2. B-Both teams advanced to the second round.

== Second round ==
A further two sides scratched from the competition as Cumnock and Strathmore were given a walkover against Tarbolton Burntonians and St Clement's respectively while Arbroath, Parkgrove and Renfrew received a bye to the third round.

The second round began on 4 October 1879 with Kilmarnock Athletic's 1–1 draw with Kilbirnie, however, most ties were played a week later. Queen's Park marched through to the third round with a resounding 14–1 win over 1st Lanark RV while there were also big wins for South Western (9–0 vs. Athole), Dumbarton (7–0 vs. Helensburgh) and Hurlford (8–1 vs. Maybole Carrick). Morton shared 12 goals, this time with Arthurlie, but they were on the receiving end as the Barrhead side won 9–3 while Thornliebank won 6–1 at home to 17th Renfrew RV. Heart of Midlothian defeated Brunswick 3–2 on 18 October.

The second round concluded on 1 November 1879 when 3rd Lanark RV overcame Possil Bluebell 1–0 in a replay.

Jamestown had defeated Kirkintilloch Athletic 1–0 but, after their third round tie, it was discovered that the referee in that win had been a member of the club. As a result, but Kirkintilloch Athletic and Jamestown's first round opponents, Star of Leven, were reinstated to the competition to face off in the fourth round.

=== Matches ===
==== Glasgow and Suburbs ====
11 October 1879	Whitefield	3–1 (Void)	Northern	Govan
				Stadium: Whitefield Park

11 October 1879	3rd Lanark RV	0–0	Possil Bluebell	Crosshill
				Stadium: Cathkin Park

11 October 1879	Queen's Park	14–1	19th Lanark RV	Crosshill
				Stadium: Hampden Park

11 October 1879	Partick	3–1	Havelock	Partick
				Stadium: Inchview

11 October 1879	South Western	9–0	Athole	Govan
				Stadium: Copeland Park

11 October 1879	Clyde	2–1	Govan	Glasgow
				Stadium: Barrowfield Park

11 October 1879	Alexandra Athletic	5–0	Harmonic Good Templars	Glasgow
				Stadium: Kennyhill Park

11 October 1879	Pollokshields Athletic	5–1	Dennistoun	Pollokshields
				Stadium: Pollok Park

11 October 1879	John Elder	1–0 (Void)	Jordanhill	Govan
				Stadium: Fairfield

18 October 1879	Ailsa	3–1	Rosslyn	Govan
				Stadium: Buckingham Park

18 October 1879	Possilpark	4–1	High School	Glasgow
				Stadium: Burnbank Park

==== Ayrshire district ====
4 October 1879	Kilmarnock Athletic	1–1	Kilbirnie	Kilmarnock
				Stadium: Holm Quarry

11 October 1879	Mauchline	6–2	Kilmarnock	Mauchline
				Stadium: Connell Park

11 October 1879	Maybole Ladywell	6–1	Stewarton Cunninghame	Maybole

11 October 1879	Maybole Carrick	1–8	Hurlford	Maybole
				Stadium: Myremill Holm

18 October 1879	Kilmarnock Portland	2–1	Beith	Kilmarnock
				Stadium: Hamilton Park

Cumnock	w/o	Tarbolton Burntonians

==== Renfrewshire district ====
11 October 1879	Renfrew Ramblers	1–2	Barrhead Rangers	Renfrew
				Stadium: Longcroft Park

11 October 1879	Kennishead	5–0	Cartside	Thornliebank

11 October 1879	Johnstone Athletic	6–0	Cartvale	Johnstone
				Stadium: Mossbank Park

11 October 1879	17th Renfrew RV	1–6	Thornliebank	Lochwinnoch
				Stadium: Barr Castle Park

11 October 1879	Arthurlie	9–3	Morton	Barrhead
				Stadium: Arthurlie Cross

==== Lanarkshire district ====
11 October 1879	Plains Blue Bell	2–0	Newmains	Plains

11 October 1879	Airdrie	1–1	Cambuslang	Airdrie
				Stadium: Cairnhill Park

11 October 1879	Shotts	0–2	Clarkston	Shotts
				Stadium: Stane Farm

11 October 1879	Hamilton Academical	3–0	Upper Clydesdale	Hamilton
				Stadium: South Haugh

11 October 1879	Excelsior	2–1	Bellshill	Airdrie
				Stadium: Mavisbank

==== Dunbartonshire district ====
11 October 1879	Renton	1–1	Lennox	Renton
				Stadium: Tontine Park

11 October 1879	Kirkintilloch Athletic	0–1	Jamestown	Kirkintilloch
				Stadium: Bellfield Park

11 October 1879	Dumbarton	7–0	Helensburgh	Dumbarton
	Lindsay; Own goal			Stadium: Boghead Park

==== Edinburgh district ====
11 October 1879	Dunfermline	0–4	Hibernian	Dunfermline
			Quinn; Flynn	Stadium: Ladysmill

18 October 1879	Heart of Midlothian	3–2	Brunswick	Edinburgh
				Stadium: Powderhall

==== Stirlingshire district ====
11 October 1879	Milton of Campsie	0–4	Campsie Glen	Milton of Campsie
				Stadium: Brassburn Park

11 October 1879	Strathblane	1–0	Falkirk	Blanefield
				Stadium: Cuilts Park

==== Perthshire district ====
18 October 1879	Rob Roy	3–0	Vale of Teith	Callander
				Stadium: Garmhor Park

==== Forfarshire district ====
Strathmore	w/o	St Clement's

==== Wigtownshire and Dumfriesshire district ====
11 October 1879	Queen of the South Wanderers	6–0	Stranraer	Dumfries
				Stadium: Nunholm

=== Replays ===
==== Glasgow and Suburbs ====
18 October 1879	3rd Lanark RV	1–0	Possil Bluebell	Crosshill
				Stadium: Cathkin Park

25 October 1879	Jordanhill	1–2	John Elder	Glasgow
				Stadium: Anniesland Park

25 October 1879	Northern	w/o	Whitefield

==== Ayrshire district ====
18 October 1879	Kilbirnie	1–0	Kilmarnock Athletic	Kilbirnie
				Stadium: Stonyholm Park

==== Lanarkshire district ====
18 October 1879	Cambuslang	4–1	Airdrie	Cambuslang
				Stadium: Bogleshole

==== Dunbartonshire district ====
18 October 1879	Lennox	1–1	Renton	Dumbarton
				Stadium: Levenhulme Park

Notes

1. C-A protest by Northern was upheld and a replay was ordered.
2. D-A protest by Jordanhill was upheld and a replay was ordered.
3. E-Both teams advanced to the third round.

== Third round ==
Possilpark were the lucky club to receive the only bye to the fourth round. The third round began on 1 November 1879 with a clutch of ties, included amongst them; Dumbarton's 5–0 win over Renton, Queen's Park's 5–1 triumph against Partick, Thornliebank's 1–0 defeat of Barrhead Rangers and Parkgrove's first match in the competition after they benefitted from a walkover and a bye in the previous rounds, a 6–2 defeat of Alexandra Athletic. Jamestown also recorded a 5–1 win against Lennox but it was to be the end of the road for the Dunbartonshire side. After it was discovered the referee in their second round match with Kirkintilloch Athletic was a member of the club, Jamestown were disqualified and the three teams they had eliminated were reinstated in the fourth round.

Hamilton Academical defeated Excelsior 7–1 at South Haugh, Cumnock – one of three teams along with Parkgrove and Strathmore to reach the third round without playing a single game – lost 1–0 to Hurlford, Arbroath and Clyde recorded 6–1 and 6–0 wins against Strathmore and Ailsa respectively and Hibernian won 2–1 in the Edinburgh derby.

=== Matches ===
==== Glasgow and Suburbs ====
1 November 1879	Parkgrove	6–2	Alexandra Athletic	Govan
				Stadium: Trinidad Park

1 November 1879	Queen's Park	5–1	Partick	Crosshill
				Stadium: Hampden Park

1 November 1879	Clyde	6–0	Ailsa	Glasgow
				Stadium: Barrowfield Park

1 November 1879	South Western	2–1	John Elder	Govan
				Stadium: Copeland Park

1 November 1879	Pollokshields Athletic	2–1	Northern	Pollokshields
				Stadium: Pollok Park

8 November 1879	3rd Lanark RV	1–1	Glasgow University	Crosshill
				Stadium: Cathkin Park

==== Ayrshire district ====
1 November 1879	Mauchline	0–0	Kilmarnock Portland	Mauchline
				Stadium: Connell Park

8 November 1879	Cumnock	0–1	Hurlford	Cumnock
				Stadium: New Station Field

Maybole Ladywell	w/o	Kilbirnie

==== Renfrewshire district ====
1 November 1879	Arthurlie	1–2	Renfrew	Barrhead
				Stadium: Arthurlie Cross

1 November 1879	Johnstone Athletic	3–1	Kennishead	Johnstone
				Stadium: Mossbank Park

1 November 1879	Thornliebank	1–0	Barrhead Rangers	Thornliebank
				Stadium: Deacon's Bank

==== Lanarkshire and Dumfriesshire district ====
1 November 1879	Cambuslang	4–2	Clarkston	Cambuslang
				Stadium: Bogleshole; Referee:

8 November 1879	Hamilton Academical	7–1	Excelsior	Hamilton
				Stadium: South Haugh

Plains Blue Bell	w/o	Queen of the South Wanderers

==== Dumbartonshire district ====
1 November 1879	Dumbarton	5–0	Renton	Dumbarton
				Stadium: Boghead Park

1 November 1879	Jamestown	5–1 (Void)	Lennox	Jameston
				Stadium: Balloch Road

==== Edinburgh and Perthshire district ====
8 November 1879	Rob Roy	1–0	Edinburgh University	Callander
				Stadium: Garmhor Park

15 November 1879	Hibernian	2–1	Heart of Midlothian	Edinburgh
	Byrne; Cavanagh			Stadium: Mayfield

==== Stirlingshire district ====
1 November 1879	Campsie Glen	1–2	Strathblane	Lennoxtown
				Stadium: Lennox Park; Referee: A. Muir

==== Forfarshire district ====
15 November 1879	Arbroath	6–1	Strathmore	Arbroath
				Stadium: Hospitalfield

=== Replay ===
==== Glasgow and Suburbs ====
15 November 1879	3rd Lanark RV	6–0	Glasgow University	Crosshill
				Stadium: Cathkin Park

==== Ayrshire district ====
8 November 1879	Kilmarnock Portland	0–1	Mauchline	Kilmarnock
				Stadium: Hamilton Park

== Fourth round ==
The fourth round began with two matches to determine which of Jamestown's reinstated opponents would take their place in the competition. First, Kirkintilloch Athletic defeated Star of Leven 5–2 on 15 November 1879 to earn the right to play Lennox whom they defeated 6–2 a week later. However, it was ultimately in vain as they lost 5–1 to 3rd Lanark RV on 29 November.

The round saw a number of one-sided games. On 22 November 1879, three teams recorded double-figures scorelines; Dumbarton won 11–0 at home to Clyde, Queen's Park defeated Strathblane 10–1 at Hampden Park and Thornliebank won 12–0 at home to Possilpark. Hibernian drew 2–2 with Parkgrove and Kilbirnie drew 1–1 with Hurlford to set up replays the following week but all four sides advanced to the fifth round after both replays ended with the scores tied.

=== Matches ===
15 November 1879	Kirkintilloch Athletic	5–2	Star of Leven	Kirkintilloch
				Stadium: Bellfield Park

22 November 1879	Kirkintilloch Athletic	6–2	Lennox	Kirkintilloch
				Stadium: Bellfield Park

22 November 1879	Hibernian	2–2	Parkgrove	Edinburgh
				Stadium: Mayfield

22 November 1879	South Western	4–0	Arbroath	Govan
				Stadium: Copeland Park

22 November 1879	Pollokshields Athletic	2–1	Renfrew	Pollokshields
				Stadium: Pollok Park

22 November 1879	Kilbirnie	1–1	Hurlford	Kilbirnie
				Stadium: Stonyholm Park

22 November 1879	Dumbarton	11–0	Clyde	Dumbarton
				Stadium: Boghead Park

22 November 1879	Rob Roy	4–2	Johnstone Athletic	Callander
				Stadium: Garmhor Park

22 November 1879	Thornliebank	12–0	Possilpark	Thornliebank
				Stadium: Deacon's Bank

22 November 1879	Queen's Park	10–1	Strathblane	Crosshill
				Stadium: Hampden Park

29 November 1879	3rd Lanark RV	5–1	Kirkintilloch Athletic	Crosshill
				Stadium: Cathkin Park

29 November 1879	Hamilton Academical	0–2	Mauchline	Hamilton
				Stadium: South Haugh

29 November 1879	Cambuslang	3–0	Plains Blue Bell	Cambuslang
				Stadium: Bogleshole

=== Replays ===
29 November 1879	Parkgrove	2–2	Hibernian	Govan
				Stadium: Trinidad Park

29 November 1879	Hurlford	1–1	Kilbirnie	Hurlford
				Stadium: Blair Park

Notes

1. F-Abandoned after 75 minutes due to darkness.
2. G-Both teams advanced to the fifth round.

== Fifth round ==
3rd Lanark RV were the only team to receive a bye to the quarter-finals. All six of the fifth round ties were played on 20 December 1879 with one tie going to a reply the following week. Queen's Park recorded the biggest win of the competition as they defeated Hurlford 15–1 at Hampden Park. Thornliebank also recorded a double-figures as they beat Rob Roy 12–0 at home. A double from Quinn helped Hibernian to a 2–0 win at Connell Park against Mauchline while Dumbarton beat Kilbirnie 6–2 at Boghead Park. South Western had defeated Parkgrove 1–0 in the first match but a successful protest warranted a replay and South Western progressed with a 3–2 win.

=== Matches ===
20 December 1879	Parkgrove	0–1 (Void)	South Western	Govan
				Stadium: Trinidad Park

20 December 1879	Dumbarton	6–2	Kilbirnie	Dumbarton
				Stadium: Boghead Park

20 December 1879	Queen's Park	15–1	Hurlford	Crosshill
				Stadium: Hampden Park

20 December 1879	Thornliebank	12–0	Rob Roy	Thornliebank
				Stadium: Deacon's Bank

20 December 1879	Cambuslang	0–4	Pollokshields Athletic	Cambuslang
				Stadium: Bogleshole

20 December 1879	Mauchline	0–2	Hibernian	Mauchline
			Quinn (x2)	Stadium: Connell Park

=== Replay ===
27 December 1879	Parkgrove	2–3	South Western	Govan
				Stadium: Trinidad Park

Notes

1. H-A protest by Parkgrove was upheld and a replay was ordered.

== Quarter-finals ==
With just seven teams left, there were only three quarter-final ties and Queen's Park received a bye to the semi-finals. The first match, between Thornliebank and 3rd Lanark RV was due to be played on 27 December 1879 but was abandoned due to the weather. On 3 January 1880, Dumbarton and Pollokshields Athletic recorded comfortable home wins, 6–2 vs. Hibernian and 6–1 vs. South Western respectively. In the replay at Cathkin Park, Thornliebank and 3rd Lanark RV played out a 1–1 draw before Thornliebank won the second replay 2–1 – played at the ground of South Western as Cathkin Park was being used for international trial matches.

=== Matches ===
27 December 1879	Thornliebank	0–2 (Abandoned)	3rd Lanark RV	Thornliebank
				Stadium: Deacon's Bank

3 January 1880	Pollokshields Athletic	6–1	South Western	Pollokshields
				Stadium: Pollok Park

3 January 1880	Dumbarton	6–2	Hibernian	Dumbarton
			Rourke (x2)	Stadium: Boghead Park; Attendance: 2,000

=== Replay ===
3 January 1880	3rd Lanark RV	1–1	Thornliebank	Crosshill
				Stadium: Cathkin Park

=== Second replay ===
10 January 1880	Thornliebank	2–1 (a.e.t.)	3rd Lanark RV	Govan
				Stadium: Copeland Park

Notes

1. I-Abandoned after 35 minutes due to inclement weather.

== Semi-finals ==
For the first time in four seasons, two semi-finals were played. Both games were played on 17 January 1880. Queen's Park saw off Dumbarton 1–0 at Hampden Park to reach the final for the first time in four years while Thornliebank defeated Pollokshields Athletic 2–1 at home to reach the final for the first time.

=== Matches ===
17 January 1880	Queen's Park	1–0	Dumbarton	Crosshill
				Stadium: Hampden Park

17 January 1880	Thornliebank	2–1	Pollokshields Athletic	Thornliebank
				Stadium: Deacon's Bank

== Final ==
The final took place at Cathkin Park on 21 February 1880. It was Thornliebank's first appearance in the final but for Queen's Park, it was their fourth and on each of their previous three appearances, they lifted the trophy. Thomas Highet – who scored three goals in the 1876 final and replay, the last time Queen's Park won the competition – scored twice against Thornliebank to help Queen's Park to a 3–0 win and a fourth title, maintaining their 100 per cent record in Scottish Cup finals.

21 February 1880
15:00

Queen's Park	3–0	Thornliebank
Ker; Highet (x2)

Cathkin Park, Crosshill
Attendance: 4,000

== See also ==
- 1879–80 in Scottish football
