= 1880–81 Morton F.C. season =

Morton
1880–81 season
- Scottish Cup: Second round (lost to Abercorn)
- Highest home attendance: c. 2,000 v. Abercorn (2 October 1880, Scottish Cup).

The 1880–81 season was Morton Football Club's fourth season in which they competed at a national level, entering the Scottish Cup.

== Fixtures and results ==
Win Draw Loss Postponed

=== Scottish Cup ===
18 September 1880 First Round	Morton	3 – 2	Glenkilloch	Cappielow Park
	,,		,

2 October 1880 Second Round	Abercorn	4 – 2	Morton	Blackstoun Park
	MacAulay; Fulton		Gillespie	Attendance: 2,000

=== Renfrewshire Cup ===
9 October 1880 First Round	Johnstone Athletic	4 – 2	Morton	Mossbank Park
	,,,		,

=== Friendlies ===
18 September 1880 Friendly	Morton	4 – 0	Orient	Cappielow Park
	Gillespie, Fleming; Bell		,

16 October 1880 Friendly	Morton	2 – 2	Johnstone	Cappielow Park
	,		,

23 October 1880 Friendly	Govan	2 – 3	Morton	Moore Park
	,		,,

30 October 1880 Friendly	^{[note 1]}Morton	1 – 1	Greenock Southern	Cappielow Park
	Hannah		Cameron

6 November 1880 Friendly	Morton	1 – 1	City	Cappielow Park
	Goal		Goal

28 November 1880 Friendly	Morton	2 – 0	Abercorn	Cappielow Park
	,

29 January 1881 Friendly	Morton	3 – 3	Rangers Swifts	Cappielow Park
	,,		,,

5 February 1881 Friendly	Morton	4 – 1 ^{[note 2]}	Wellington	Cappielow Park
	,,,		Goal

12 February 1881 Friendly	Morton	1 – 2	Johnstone Athletic	Cappielow Park
	Goal		,

26 February 1881 Friendly	Pollok	3 – 2	Morton	Broom Park
	,,		,

12 March 1881 Friendly	Morton	3 – 1	Govan	Cappielow Park
	,,		Goal

19 March 1881 Friendly	Orient	0 – 3	Morton
			Ramsay; Barrie; Gillespie

2 April 1881 Friendly	Abercorn	2 – 0	Morton	Blackstoun Park
	,

9 April 1881 Friendly	Morton	3 – 1	Ladyburn	Cappielow Park
	,,		Goal

16 April 1881 Friendly	Morton	–	Pollok^{[note 3]}	Cappielow Park

1. Scratch Morton team.
2. One goal from each team was recorded as "disputed".
3. Pollok failed to appear.
