= Cartside F.C. =

Former association football club in Scotland

Cartside
- Full name: Cartside Football Club
- Founded: 1878
- Dissolved: 1881
- Ground: Over Johnston
- Match Secretary: William Boyd
- Hon. Secretary: David Wedderspoon
colours

Cartside Football Club was a football club based in Kilbarchan, near Johnstone, Renfrewshire, in Scotland.

== History ==
The club was one of four senior clubs in the area formed in 1878, along with Johnstone F.C., Johnstone Rovers, and Johnstone Athletic.

The club entered the Scottish Cup for the first time in 1879–80, losing 5–0 in the second round to Kennishead after a first round bye. Cartside gained a revenge the following season, with a 6–2 win, albeit by this time Kennishead had been denuded by the more established Thornliebank side which had taken most of its forward line. Cartside had the benefit of a bye in the second round and hosted Yoker in the third round, coming from 3–0 down to take an apparent 4–3 victory, but the tie was declared a draw after a Yoker protest, and Cartside's replay win put the club into the final 21 clubs. At that stage the club lost 3–1 at home to Hurlford.

Cartside was always by far the smallest senior side in Johnstone. By 1880 the three other clubs had 350 members between them; Cartside had just 30. By 1881 it still only had 36 and the next smallest in the town (Johnstone) had 100; even the newly founded Kilbarchan had 54.

Cartside had also played the fewest matches of any of the sides in the town in 1880–81, with 5 wins from its 10 matches. It did not even enter the Renfrewshire Cup. It did however enter the Johnstone & District Cup in 1879–80 and 1880–81, winning one tie, a 6–2 home win over Kilbarchan in 1880–81.

The size gap was too big for Cartside to catch up, and, although it entered the 1881–82 Scottish Cup and was drawn to face Pollok in the first round, it had dissolved before it could play the tie.

== Colours ==
The club wore red and black hooped jerseys and hose, and white knickers.

== Ground ==
The club's ground was Over Johnstone Park, a 3-minute walk from Millikenpark railway station. Kilbarchan moved into the ground briefly in 1890.
