= Bellshill F.C. =

Bellshill
- Full name: Bellshill Football Club
- Founded: 1879
- Dissolved: 1884
- Ground: Viewhill Park
- President: H. N. L. Foster Esq., R. Neilson Esq.
- Secretary: Andrew Burns, James Scott
Home colours

Bellshill Football Club was a 19th-century football club based in Bellshill, Lanarkshire, Scotland.

== History ==
The club was formed in August 1879.

It shares the distinction with Dean F.C. of Kilmarnock and Angus F.C. of Forfar of having played 4 Scottish Cup ties, all in the main competition stages, and having lost them all. Its results were:

- 1879–80: 1–2 at Excelsior; a second round tie as Bellshill were admitted to the competition after the first round.
- 1880–81: 0–3 at Airdrie
- 1881–82: scratched to Airdriehill
- 1882–83: 1–2 at Benhar
- 1883–84: 0–8 at Cambuslang; six goals came in the first half, when Cambuslang was kicking against the wind and the sun.

Four months into its first season, in November 1879, Bellshill was one of the 16 clubs which founded the Lanarkshire Football Association. Bellshill duly entered the first Lanarkshire Cup, but lost in the first round at Shettleston, a Bellshill protest being dismissed.

In its first season, Bellshill had 30 members, which put it on par with clubs like Excelsior and Cambuslang. However, it did not participate in the 1881–82 season, as its players (including captain William Moody) and committee members had mainly been part of the junior Bellshill Daisy club. The Scottish Football Association recorded the club as "dissolved," although upon Bellshill's return in 1882, it still claimed a foundation date of 1879.

That seems to have stalled the club, as, by 1883, Bellshill had not grown at all, but Cambuslang had 70 members and Excelsior (now called Airdrieonians) had 40. The size of the gap was shown by a 10–0 friendly defeat at Royal Albert in February 1883; four years earlier, the clubs had been of similar sizes, but the Royalists now had double the membership. The club did not pay its subscription to the Scottish Football Association for 1884–85, being struck from the membership before the season started.

== Colours ==
Bellshill originally played in cardinal and white, with white trousers. In 1882, it changed to 1 1/2-inch black-and-white hooped jerseys and white knickers.

== Grounds ==
The club originally played at Bellshill Park, a 15-minute walk from Bellshill railway station, gaining its venue in 1880 at Viewhill Park, Muirmadkin Road.
