= 1879–80 in Scottish football =

Football in Scotland
- Season: 1879–80

1879–80 in Scottish football

Scottish Cup winners
- Queen's Park

The 1879–80 season was the seventh season of competitive football in Scotland. This season saw the introduction of the fourth regional competition with the inaugural playing of the Lanarkshire Cup.

== Scottish Cup ==
Winner	Score	Runner-up
Queen's Park	3–0	Thornliebank

== County honours ==
Competition	Winner	Score	Runner-up
Ayrshire Cup	Beith	1–0	Kilbirnie
Edinburgh FA Cup	Hibernian	5–0	Dunfermline
Lanarkshire Cup	Stonelaw	2–0	Shotts
Renfrewshire Cup	Thornliebank	2–0	Kennishead

== Other honours ==
Competition	Winner	Score	Runner-up
Glasgow Charity Cup	Queen's Park	2–1*	Rangers

* After a replay

== Teams in F.A. Cup ==
Season	Club	Round	Score	Result
1879–80	Queen's Park	1st round	(England) Sheffield	Withdrew

== Scotland national team ==
Date	Venue	Opponents	Score	Competition	Scotland scorers
13 March 1880	Hampden Park, Glasgow	England	5–4	Friendly	George Ker (3), John Campbell Baird, John Kay
27 March 1880	Hampden Park, Glasgow	Wales	5–1	Friendly	David Davidson, William Beveridge, Joseph Lindsay, J. McAdam, John Campbell
