= 23rd Renfrewshire Rifle Volunteers F.C. =

Former association football club in Scotland

23rd Renfrewshire Rifle Volunteers
- Full name: 23rd Renfrewshire Rifle Volunteers F.C.
- Nicknames: 23d R.R.V., the Volunteers
- Founded: 1873
- Dissolved: 1879
- Ground: Muirland Park, Cathcart
- Secretary: John Dewar, George Fyfe, John M'Intosh
Home colours

23rd Renfrewshire Rifle Volunteers (RV) was a 19th-century football club based in New Cathcart, in Glasgow, which participated in the early seasons of the Scottish Cup.

== History ==
The club was founded in November 1873 The club was formed out of a Volunteer company within the 2nd Administrative Battalion of the Renfrewshire RV.

Its first reported match was against the Eastern second XI. The 23rd R.R.V. met the Eastern's first XI in its first Scottish Cup entry five months later, losing 3–0.

The club reached the second round of the Cup three times. The first time, in 1875–76, was due to the rule at the time that teams advanced after two draws, and the Volunteers held Sandyford twice. In the next two seasons, the club won its first round fixtures, beating Thornliebank in 1876–77 (2–0 in a replay at Cowglen, after a 1–1 draw at home) and Levern in 1877–78.

However, on every occasion, the club lost its third round tie, every time by 1–0; in 1876–77, the club protested the single goal scored by Busby, to no avail. The club's Cup matches were almost all low-scoring affairs, only 12 goals being scored in 10 games.

The club did enter the first Renfrewshire Cup in 1878–79, beating Johnstone Athletic and Pollok to reach the third round, where it lost to Thornliebank Caledonia by the only goal.

The club scratched from its final Scottish Cup entry in 1879–80 and there are no further matches recorded for the club.

== Colours ==
The club played in dark blue jerseys and knickerbockers, and red socks.

== Ground ==
The club played at Muirland Park in New Cathcart, provided to the club by Mr Curr of Merrylee Farm.
