= Shettleston F.C. =

Shettleston F.C. may refer to:

- Shettleston F.C. (1880), Scottish association football club from the 19th century
- Glasgow United F.C., football club formerly known as Shettleston
