= 1877–78 Morton F.C. season =

Morton
1877–78 season
- Scottish Cup: First round (lost to Barrhead)

The 1877–78 season was Morton Football Club's first season in which they competed at a national level, entering the fifth Scottish Cup.

== Fixtures and results ==
Win Draw Loss Postponed

=== Scottish Cup ===
29 September 1877 First Round	Barrhead	7 – 0	Morton	Beaconsfield Park
	,,,,,,

=== Friendlies ===
22 September 1877 Friendly	Morton	0 – 2	Possil Park	Garvel Park
			,

3 November 1877 Friendly	Morton	1 – 0	Renfrew Ramblers	Garvel Park
	Goal

10 November 1877 Friendly	Wellington Park	1 – 2	Morton	Wellington Park
	Richmond		Blake; MacGuire

1 December 1877 Friendly	Port Glasgow Athletic	0 – 3	Morton	Devol Farm
			,,

26 January 1878 Friendly	Morton	1 – 0	Port Glasgow Athletic	Garvel Park
	Goal

9 March 1878 Friendly	Morton	0 – 3	Derby	Garvel Park
			,,

16 March 1878 Friendly	Morton	3 – 0	Kelvinside	Garvel Park
	,,

23 March 1878 Friendly	Morton	0 – 0	Wellington Park	Garvel Park

23 March 1878 Friendly	Morton	5 – 0	Greenock Ramblers	Garvel Park
	,,,,
