= Kinning Park Athletic F.C. =

Former association football club in Scotland

Kinning Park Athletic
- Full name: Kinning Park Athletic Football Club
- Founded: 1881
- Dissolved: 1885
- Ground: Vermont Park
- Hon. Secretary: Donald M'Allister, Thomas Crawford
- Match Secretary: Christopher Steel, Francis Blake
Home colours

Kinning Park Athletic F.C. was a nineteenth-century Glasgow-based football club, from Kinning Park, Govan, now in Glasgow. The club was also referred to as Kinning Park Athletics.

== History ==
The club was formed in March 1881, with 49 members on joining the Scottish Football Association three months later. It entered the 1881–82 Scottish Cup, and gained a walkover in the first round, as opponents Kelvinbank scratched. In the second round, Kinning Park was beaten 3–0 by Partick, despite Partick missing star forward M'Naughton; Partick also had two goals disallowed.

The club left the Scottish FA in August 1882, but was re-founded in 1884, with the same ground and colours. This senior stint also only lasted one season as it left the Scottish FA again in August 1885.

The obvious difficulty for the club was that Rangers played at the Kinning Park ground, and had already attracted the loyalties of local supporters. Its second and last season as a senior club saw the club lose 8–0 at Battlefield in the Cup, and 9–0 at Dalry in a friendly. The club's true level was shown by the only non-defeats recorded for it, which were both against junior sides - a 4–1 win against fellow Kinning Park side Violet in January 1885, and a 2–2 draw with Western Athletics in March 1885, which appears to be the club's final match.

== Colours ==
The club originally wore dark blue jerseys and "pants", with a red stripe on the side, and black and white hose.

== Ground ==
The club's home ground was Vermont Park, at the head of Lambhill Street.
