= Levern F.C. =

Association football club in Scotland

Levern
- Full name: Levern Football Club
- Nickname: Stubborn Chiels
- Founded: 1874
- Dissolved: 1884
- Ground: Wellington Park
Home colours

Levern Football Club was a Scottish football club from the village of Hurlet, near Barrhead, East Renfrewshire.

== History ==
The club was founded in 1874 and its first recorded match was against Busby that November, a first XI playing in Hurlet and a second XI visiting Busby.

Levern entered the Scottish Cup from 1875 to 1883. Its first entry, in 1875–76, was its most successful. In the first round, the club played Barrhead side Arthurlie, drawing 0–0 away from home; the club was still so obscure that the Scotsman gave the club's name as Severn. The Scotsman got the club's name right for the replay, which Levern won 4–0 in a "fast and well-contested game". In the second round the club beat Hamilton F.C. 3–0 with goals from Cameron, Craig, and Crawford.

The club's third round defeat at home to the 3rd Lanarkshire Rifle Volunteers was the club's only defeat of the season. Criticism was made of the club's "charging" game, as being "very common amongst provincial clubs, but is certainly not one to be commended or cultivated". This criticism was emphasized at the start of the 1876–77 season, when "a disgusted spectator" said of the club's tactics against Barrhead that "foul charging, shoving with their hands, and hacking seem to them to be the best way of playing football". The club's umpire John Chisholm did defend the club, and said that a "bitter animosity" had developed between the sides over a series of matches.

There was however some force to the critique of the club's style as not being the most effective way to play. By 1876–77 Levern was already lagging behind Arthurlie, losing in the first round of the 1876–77 Scottish Cup to Airdrie F.C., while Arthurlie reached the third round; the 'Lie would reach that far - or further - for every season of Levern's existence, while Levern won only one more tie, against Greenock Morton in 1881–82.

Levern entered the first Renfrewshire Cup in 1878–79, but lost at Glenkilloch in the first round. The club's only win in the competition also came in 1881–82, away to old rivals Barrhead, 3–0, after Barrhead protested Levern's original 2–0 win.

The biggest defeat recorded for the club was its 7–1 defeat at Abercorn in the 1883–84 Scottish Cup; by this time Levern had slipped so far down that the Glasgow Herald had taken the club full circle by referring to it as Severn. Levern's 6–0 loss at Arthurlie in the Renfrewshire Cup on 13 October 1883 was the club's final competitive match.

== Colours ==
The club played in blue and white hoops with navy shorts until 1879, when the shorts were changed to white.

== Ground ==
The club originally played at Wellington Park, Househill; a quarter of a mile from Nitshill railway station. By 1881 the club was playing at Darnley Holm.
