= Abercorn F.C. =

Former association football club in Scotland

Abercorn
- Full name: Abercorn Football Club
- Nicknames: the Abbies, the Blackstounites
- Founded: 1877
- Dissolved: 1920
- Ground: East Park, Paisley (1877–1879); Blackstoun Park, Paisley (1879–1889); Underwood Park, Paisley (1889–1899); Old Ralston Park, Paisley (1899–1909); New Ralston Park, Paisley (1909–1920)
Home colours

Abercorn Football Club was a football club in Paisley, Scotland. The club were members of the Scottish Football League from 1890 until 1915 and folded in 1920. Abercorn were founder members of the Scottish Football League, but eventually could not compete with local rivals St Mirren. During their time in the SFL the club played at Underwood Park, Old Ralston Park and New Ralston Park. Their colours were blue and white stripes.

== History ==
Abercorn F.C. was formed on 10 November 1877 with an initial membership of 200, a few months after St Mirren had been formed in the town, with their first game been played in December against the 79th Highland Reserve Volunteers, the match ending in a 1–1; Robert Fulton, the president of the club, recorded the first goal, and gate were receipts of £3.

In June 1878 at a meeting at the Star Hotel in Paisley were the representatives from Abercorn, Arthurlie, Barrhead, Barrhead Rangers, Barrhead Thistle, Bridge of Weir, Caledonia (Thornliebank), Cartvale, Clydevale (Greenock), Glenkilloch, Johnstone Athletic, Jordanhill, Levern, Linwood, Pollok, Thornliebank, 17th R.R.V. and 23rd R.R.V.. At the meeting these clubs became the founder members of Renfrewshire County Football Association and a cup was purchased a year later from Summerton Jewellers of Paisley. Abercorn would win the Renfrewshire County Cup on five occasions, the first time, in 1886, with a 3–0 victory over Port Glasgow Athletic at Cappielow Park; although Abercorn was the outsider, the Greenock locals were decidedly on the Abbies' side.

In 1887–88, Abercorn reached semi-final of the Scottish Cup; in those days, the semi-finals were not at neutral venues, and the Abbies were drawn at home to Cambuslang. Munro gave Abercorn a half-time lead, but Cambuslang dominated the second half, Plenderleith levelling the tie. The replay was a disaster; Abercorn conceded a goal just on half-time to give Cambuslang a 2–1 lead, and collapsed in the second-half to a 10–1 defeat. They would repeat the achievement of reaching the cup semi-finals in each of their next two seasons.

In 1890 the club became founder members of the Scottish Football League, alongside Cambuslang, Celtic, Cowlairs, Dumbarton, Heart of Midlothian, Rangers, Renton, Saint Mirren, Third Lanark and Vale of Leven. The club finished the inaugural season of the league in seventh place out of ten, but had the satisfaction of finishing ahead of St Mirren, who ended in eighth place. This success was short-lived, however, as when a Scottish Football League Division Two was created in 1893, Abercorn and Clyde were voted out of Division One because they had remained amateur clubs, and were instead forced to become founder members of the lower division; the club's refusal to turn professional would eventually drive the club out of existence. In 1895–96 the club won Division Two, earning promotion back to Division One after a ballot. However, they finished bottom of Division One the following season, and were relegated back to Division Two.

Abercorn won the lower championship in 1908–09, but were not promoted to Division One. They also failed to be elected to Division One after finishing as runners-up in 1911–12. The following season the club won the Scottish Qualifying Cup; during their run in this competition the club got its record attendance when 7,000 spectators attended the semi-final match with Nithsdale Wanderers.

The club dropped out of the Scottish Football League in 1915, when Division Two went into abeyance. They played in the Western League from 1915–16 until 1919–20, when their lease on their New Ralston ground was ended at the behest of the local town council. This was ostensibly in order to build an Ice Rink, which did not happen for another four years. It was long accused that St Mirren had used their connections with Paisley Town Council to kill off their rival.

Unable to secure another ground within the town, this effectively spelled the end of Abercorn. Despite not being entered in any league competition they played one game in season 1920–21 with effectively a scratch team in a Scottish Cup defeat away to Vale of Leven. Around 2,000 spectators witnessed the last game that Abercorn played, which resulted in an 8–2 victory for Vale of Leven. Abercorn retained membership of the Scottish Football Association until 29 March 1922, when they were disbarred for failing to secure their own private home ground. Effectively though the club were defunct in 1920 when it played its last game, although an annual Abercorn Football Club dinner was still held in the town until 1939 just before the outbreak of World War II.

In season 2009–10, 90 years after the original club disappeared, a new club was formed under the Abercorn name in Paisley. The new club has had a marked lack of success, however. In its inaugural 18-game season, it lost all its matches.

== Colours ==
The club's colours were white and blue, in varying arrangements:

- 1877–1880: Royal blue and white hooped shirts, white shorts.
- 1880–1882: Navy blue shirts, white shorts.
- 1882–1908: White shirts, navy blue shorts.
- 1910–1911: Royal blue shirts, white shorts.
- 1911–1920: Royal blue and white striped shirts, white shorts.

== Ground ==
Their home matches were initially played at East Park on the corner of Seedhill Road and Mill Street, before moving onto Blackstoun Park in Well Street in 1879. In 1889 they moved 200 yards to Underwood Park, where they remained until an 1899 move to Old Ralston Park in East Lane in the Williamsburgh area of Paisley which was 700 yards from their first ground at East Park. In 1909 the club moved to a site directly to the west of Old Ralston Park; New Ralston Park.

== Notable players ==
- * Notable players ( 63 )

== Honours ==
Scottish Division Two

- Champions: 1895–96, 1908–09

Scottish Qualifying Cup

- Winners: 1912–13

Renfrewshire Cup

- Winners: 1885–86, 1886– 87, 1888–89, 1889–90

Renfrewshire Victoria Cup

- Winners: 1911–12

Paisley Charity Cup

- Winners: 1885–86, 1888–89, 1891–92, 1894–95, 1904–05, 1908–09, 1912–13

Abercorn Sports Tournament

- Winners: 1891

== Other sports ==
Robert Mitchell (Abercorn FC) won the Scottish half-mile championship at Powderhall Stadium, Edinburgh, in June 1894, and was second in the quarter-mile behind Alfred Downer of Scottish Pelicans. As a member of St Mirren Mitchell had previously won the Scottish half-mile title four times, from 1889 to 1892.
