= Victoria F.C. =

Former association football club in Scotland

Victoria
- Full name: Victoria Football Club
- Founded: 1878
- Dissolved: 1881
- Ground: Victoria Park
- Hon. Secretary: Thomas Maxwell
- Match Secretary: Robert Love
- Captain: W. Arrol
Home colours

Victoria Football Club was an association football club from Helensburgh, in Dunbartonshire, which twice entered the Scottish Cup.

== History ==
The Victoria club - often referred to as Helensburgh Victoria, or Victoria (Helensburgh), to distinguish it from others with a similar name - was founded in 1878. It was the second club to be founded in the town, four years after the Helensburgh Football Club. The first reported meeting of the two clubs, at Helensburgh's Kirkmichael Park in November 1879, ended 4–0 to the older club.

After winning 11 of 16 matches in 1879–80, the club joined the Scottish Football Association in 1880, entitling it to play in the 1880–81 Scottish Cup. With the Cup being drawn on a regional basis, and with the Dunbartonshire area containing the three best sides in the country at the time, the club was unlucky to be drawn to visit Dumbarton, one of the trio. Nobody gave Victoria a chance, but, with several new players in the Dumbarton line-up, it took time for the home side to gel, and Victoria was able to frustrate the home side for a while, going in at half-time 2–0 down; however Dumbarton scored five without reply in the second half.

However the club did not survive long as a senior club. Its entry to the 1881–82 Scottish Cup was its last appearance in the game. It obtained a bye in the first round, and was drawn to face Helensburgh in the second round, but scratched. A Junior club with the same name started up in 1884.

== Colours ==
The club wore navy blue, in common with many of the Dunbartonshire clubs at the time.

== Ground ==
Before turning senior, the club played at the Public Park in Helensburgh. The club's private Victoria Park ground was on the Old Luss Road, 7 minutes' walk from Helensburgh railway station. The first match at the new ground was a 7–0 victory over Bowling in February 1880, Paterson having the honour of the first goal.
