= Athole F.C. =

Association football club in Glasgow City, Scotland

Athole
- Full name: Athole Football Club
- Founded: 1879
- Dissolved: 1881
- Ground: Merkland Park
- President: Mr D. A. Gow
- Secretary: Andrew Gibb, Joseph Halley
- Captain: D. D. Thomson
Home colours

Athole Football Club was a 19th-century football club from Partick, in Glasgow.

== History ==
The club was founded in 1879, the club taking its name from its meeting place of the Athole Arms Hotel, with 60 members. The club's name was sometimes rendered as Athol but it was officially registered as Athole.

It was active in its first season, playing 38 matches. This included one match in the 1879–80 Scottish Cup - the club gained a walkover against Blythswood in the first round, which had amalgamated with the Derby club in October 1878, so its entry appears to have been either a mistake or wishful thinking. In the second round, the club lost 9–0 at home to South Western, despite some "pretty play" and good form shown by Thomson, Hunter, and Marshall.

The club however improved during the season, and a 10-man scratch side held the 3rd Lanark Rifle Volunteers to a draw in January 1880. In the 1880–81 Scottish Cup, the club drew 1–1 at home to Whitefield; logically the replay should have been at Whitefield, but Athole protested on the basis of "an irregularity in the appointment of referees", so the replay was at a neutral venue in Govan; Athole won 2–1 in extra-time. In the second round, Athole lost 1–0 at Alexandra Athletic, Duncan scoring the winner with a high shot with 4 minutes to go. Athole by now was prominent enough as a side to undertake a tour of north-east England over Christmas and New Year in 1880–81.

The club entered the 1881–82 Scottish Cup, and was drawn at home to Ingram, but, despite this improvement in trajectory, Athole had disbanded before the tie was due to be played - as indeed had Ingram. The final club secretary, Joseph Halley, later took up the same role at Cowlairs.

== Colours ==
The club played in navy blue jerseys and stockings trimmed with gold, with white knickers.

== Grounds ==
Athole played at Merkland Park in Partick, effectively evicting Rosslyn, which had to move to the University of Glasgow grounds.
