= Cree Rovers F.C. =

Former association football club in Scotland

Cree Rovers
- Full name: Cree Rovers Football Club
- Founded: 1878
- Dissolved: 1881
- Ground: Barn Park
- President and Captain: D. M'Arthur
- Secretary: James Matthews
Home colours

Cree Rovers F.C. was an association football club from Newton Stewart, Wigtownshire, Scotland.

== History ==
The club was founded in January 1878, and was named after the River Cree.

The Rovers entered the Scottish Cup four times, but only played in the competition twice. In 1878–79, the club had a walkover in the first round, but lost 3–0 at home to Queen of the South Wanderers in the second. In 1879–80, the Rovers lost 2–0 at home to Stranraer.

The club entered in both 1880–81 and 1881–82, but scratched from the 1880–81 competition, and had definitely disbanded before the 1881–82 competition, with most of the club members having joined the new Newton Stewart club. The last recorded match for the club was against a Wigtownshire select side towards the end of the 1880–81 season.

== Colours ==
The club played in blue and red hoops with white knickerbockers and blue hose, except in its first season, in which the knickerbockers were navy.

== Ground ==
The club played at Barn Park, Kirroughtree, and had its club house at the Cree Hotel.
