= William Garside =

Scottish footballer

Personal information
- Full name: William Garside
- Date of birth: 26 February 1872
- Place of birth: Milton, Glasgow, Scotland
- Date of death: 2 October 1951 (aged 79)
- Place of death: Cathcart, Glasgow, Scotland
- Position: Winger

Senior career*
Years	Team	Apps	(Gls)
1894–1897	Third Lanark	32	(7)
1897–1898	Bury	5	(0)
1898–1899	Neilston		
1899	Arthurlie		
1900	Thornliebank		
Total		37	(1)
- * Club domestic league appearances and goals

William Garside (26 February 1872 – 2 October 1951) was a Scottish footballer who played in the Football League for Bury.
