= Shettleston F.C. (1879) =

Former association football club in Scotland

Shettleston
- Full name: Shettleston Football Club
- Founded: 1880
- Dissolved: 1889
- Ground: Greenhouse Park
- President: Thomas Key
| 1879–1884 colours | 1884–86 colours |

Shettleston Football Club was a football club from Shettleston in Glasgow.

== History ==
The club was founded in 1879, and played in the first Lanarkshire Cup in 1879–80, surviving a protest from Bellshill in the first round against a 1–0 win, but losing 6–0 in the second round to Clarkston.

Shettleston entered the Scottish Cup for the first time in 1883–84, losing to Royal Albert in the first round. The club entered every season until 1889–90, but only ever won one tie; against the original Airdrie at Coatbridge in 1884–85. In the second round the club originally lost 9–1 at West Benhar, but the Scottish Football Association ordered a replay after Shettleston protested against Benhar's "rough play". This was to no avail for Shettleston as it lost again, albeit only 4–1, at neutral ground in Airdrie in front of over a thousand spectators; the Shettleston fans "hooted and hissed tremendously" at the Benhar side.

The club reached the second round again in 1887–88, in unusual circumstances. The club scratched to Carfin Shamrock in the first round, but Shettleston protested that it had been placed in the Lanarkshire section of the draw, when it should have been in the Glasgow section, given that its ground was within the Glasgow municipal boundaries. The SFA conceded a mistake had been made and re-instated Shettleston into the second round, and, in the second round, Shettleston was drawn against Glasgow opposition in Northern of Springburn. Let down by insufficient teamwork, Shettleston lost 6–3. Shamrock had beaten Shettleston in the first round in 1886–87 and Shettleston had protested about Shamrock's rough play, although the appeal was dismissed.

The club's biggest competitive win was in the first Glasgow Cup in 1887–88, winning 10–0 away at United Abstainers, scoring the first after four minutes and 4 by the time a quarter of an hour had passed. The club however lost 11–0 at Cambuslang in the second round, with goalkeeper Wilson receiving special praise for his efforts. Shettleston had a similar set of results in the tournament in 1888–89; beating Rutherglen 9–2 but losing 11–2 at Celtic, in the Bhoys' first-ever Glasgow Cup tie.

Shettleston's biggest achievements came in the North-Eastern Cup, a low-level Glaswegian tournament, albeit often consisting of no more than eight clubs. Shettleston twice reached the semi-final, in 1883–84 and 1888–89, both times after winning one tie.

The club's final recorded match is a 7–1 first round defeat at home to the Battlefield club of south Glasgow in the 1889–90 Scottish Cup. The two sides were drawn together again in the Glasgow Cup; Shettleston scratched before the inevitable defeat, unable to raise a team, and did not play competitive football again.

In 1890, after the club disbanded, a new senior club, Shettleston Swifts, started up, but it did not have any links to the Shettleston club.

== Colours ==
The club originally played in navy. In 1884 it changed to black and white, originally in ½-inch hoops and in 1886 to 1-inch "perpendicular" stripes. In 1887 the club switched to red and white stripes.

== Ground ==
The club's home ground was originally at Greenhouse Park. In 1887 the club moved to Carntyne Park.
