= Renfrew F.C. (1875) =

Former association football club in Scotland

Renfrew
- Full name: Renfrew F.C.
- Founded: 1875
- Dissolved: 1890
- Ground: Glebe Park
- Secretary: James Syme
Home colours

Renfrew Football Club was a Scottish football team located in the town of Renfrew.

== History ==
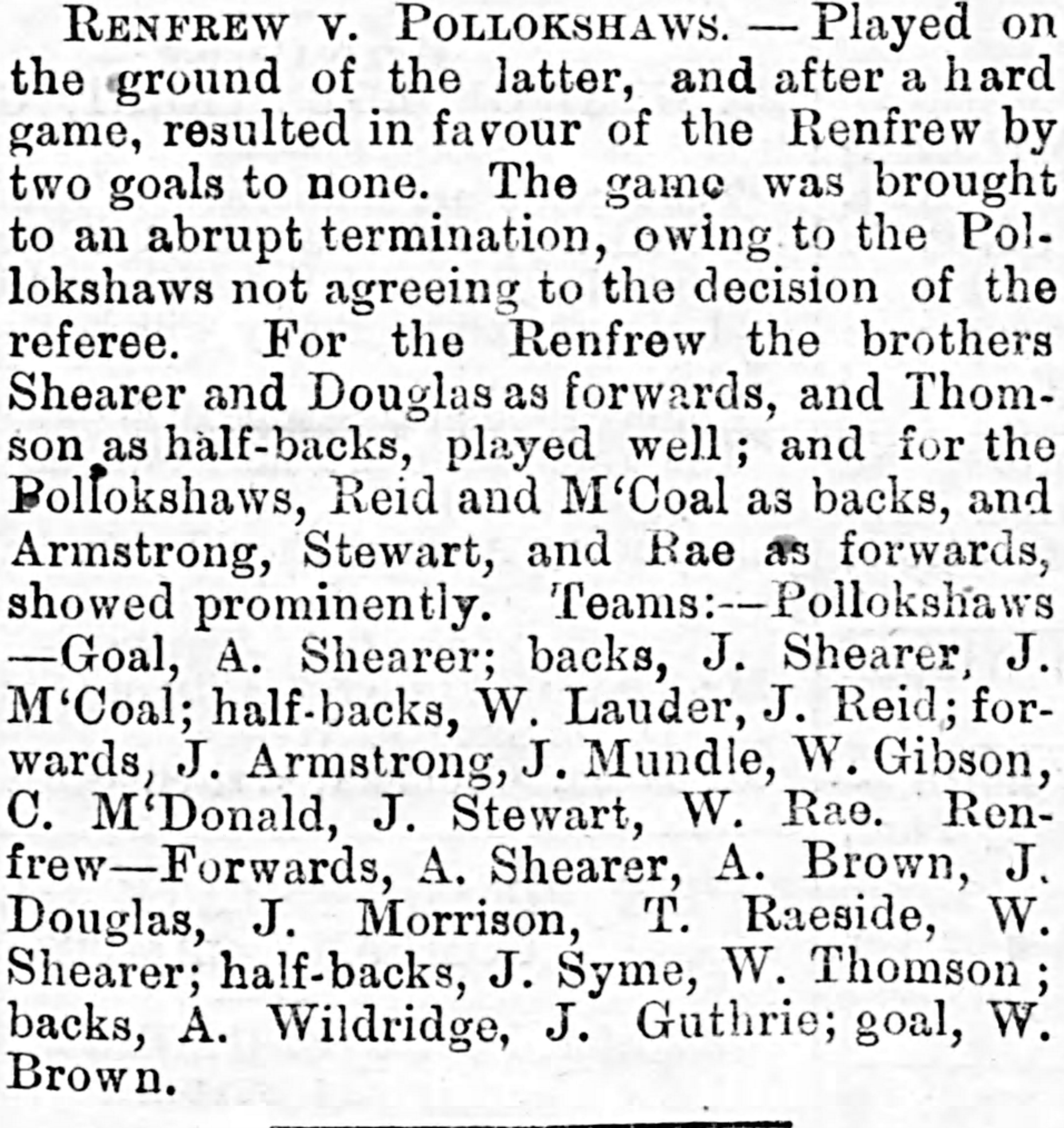
1877–78 Scottish Cup 1st Round, Pollokshaws 0–2 Renfrew, Paisley Daily Express, 8 October 1877

The club was founded in 1875, with 30 members in its first season. The club's first recorded match was a 1–0 home win against Arthurlie in February 1876.

Renfrew entered the Scottish Cup every season from 1876–77 to 1889–90. The club's second entry, in 1877–78, saw it reach the fifth round, albeit in unusual circumstances. The club won its first round tie at Pollokshaws by default, the home side walking off the pitch while 2–0 down in protest at a refereeing decision. In the second round the club won 4–0 at Glenkilloch of Neilston, but was seemingly knocked out in the third by Barrhead, which then beat Partick in the fourth round. However Barrhead was disqualified from the competition and both Renfrew and Partick were placed in the fifth round, which that season consisted of the final 12 clubs. Renfrew's run came to an end with a 2–0 loss to Mauchline.

The club was soon overtaken by other clubs in the district. The Renfrewshire Cup started in 1879–80 but the club did not enter until 1881–82; it lost 3–0 to Arthurlie in the semi-finals. The club entered the competition for the next 8 seasons but never reached so far again.

By 1889. the club was in financial difficulties, and was dependent on Abercorn from Paisley - a much larger town than Renfrew - agreeing to play a friendly free of charge later in the season in order to replenish funds. The club entered both the Scottish Cup and the Renfrewshire Cup for 1889–90, but withdrew from both competitions without playing a match, not being able to get up an XI even for the cannon-fodder of Greenock Abstainers in the national competition. The club was formally struck off the Scottish FA register in August 1890.

== Colours ==
The club wore navy shirts, white knickers, and blue and white hose until 1887. In 1887 the club changed to all navy, and from 1888 all white.

== Ground ==
The club played at Glebe Park, on the Paisley Road. There was an incident of hooliganism at the ground at the start of the 1887–88 season, when one Wm. Hughes of Glasgow refused to pay the admission fee for a friendly with Dykebar, and threatened to knife anyone who tried to charge him; he was fined £1.

== Notable players ==
- Jimmy Douglas, who played for Renfrew from 1879 to 1880, during which time he earned an international cap, and later won the FA Cup with Blackburn Rovers
