= Irvine F.C. (1875) =

Association football club in Scotland

Irvine
- Full name: Irvine Football Club
- Nickname(s): the Irvinites
- Founded: 1875
- Dissolved: 1881
- Ground: Kilwinning Park
- Secretary: James Lightbody
Home colours

Irvine Football Club was a football club from the town of Irvine, Ayrshire, Scotland.

== History ==
The club was formed in 1875, as an offshoot of a cricket club formed the previous year, and played its first match on the Burgh Moor in November that year against Portland of Kilmarnock, losing 2–0 after conceding two late goals to the more experienced club.

The club was one of the entrants to the first Ayrshire Cup in 1877–78, being thrown out of the competition on a technicality.

Irvine entered the Scottish Cup on three occasions. Its first entry in 1879–80 saw the club disqualified without playing. Irvine was drawn at home to Cumnock, and set the kick-off for 3.30; Cumnock arrived two hours late because of a railway accident, Irvine refused to play, and both sides claimed the tie. The Scottish Football Association ordered a replay on the following Saturday, tossing a coin to see who would host the tie. The coin fell in favour of Cumnock, but Irvine refused to turn up, perhaps peeved at having lost home advantage through no fault of its own, and the SFA disqualified Irvine for not complying with the SFA's direction.

In 1880–81 the club played its only Cup match, at Beith, losing 4–1 after failing to take advantage of the strong wind behind its players in the first half. The club was due to host Hurlford in the first round in 1881–82, but, on the basis that the players had not had any practice, the club agreed to cede the tie.

The club's final competitive match was a 4–0 Ayrshire Cup defeat at Stewarton Cunninghame in October 1881, and the final actual recorded match a 3–1 defeat at home to the obscure Ayr Western. A concert was given to raise funds for the club on 30 December 1881, although an advert for it appeared on the following day. There are no recorded matches afterwards.

== Colours ==
The club's colours were originally red, white, and blue, probably in hoops as the dominant design at the time. The colours it registered with the Scottish FA were navy blue shirts and white shorts.

== Grounds ==
The club originally played on the Burgh Moor, moving to a pitch on the Irvine Mains farm by 1878. By 1879 the club was playing at the Newfield ground on the Kilwinning Road, later the home of the Irvine Academicals.
