= City F.C. =

Former association football club in Scotland

- Full name: City Football Club
- Founded: 1878
- Dissolved: 1881
- Ground: Ashton Park
- Secretary: George Bruce, John Munro
Home colours

City Football Club was a football club based in the burgh of Partick (now part of the city of Glasgow), Scotland.

== History ==
The club was founded in 1878 with 40 members. It had some professional leanings; the second club secretary, John Munro, was an accountant at a company processing Spanish pyrites.

City joined the Scottish Football Association in 1879, and entered the 1879–80 Scottish Cup. In the first round, City drew 1–1 with Possilpark in a "very hard and fast but pleasant" game, but lost 3–1 in the replay. City protested that Possilpark had not ensured the pitch area had been properly roped off, leading to spectator interference, and that one goal had come via a rebound from a flagpost on the touchline. The Scottish Football Association unanimously dismissed the protest.

City had the benefit of its 1880–81 Scottish Cup first round opponents 19th L.R.V. scratching from the competition. In the second round the club was well beaten at Pilgrims.

Although the club claimed 50 members at the start of the 1880–81 season, which was not insubstantial - it was the same size as fellow suburb club Partick and larger than Partick Thistle - the club dissolved before the 1881–82 season, unable to take up its place in the Scottish Cup. Ironically its scheduled opponents Dennistoun had dissolved several months before.

== Colours ==
The club played in 1" navy blue and 1/2" white hooped jerseys, and white shorts.

== Ground ==
The club played at Ashton Park, behind the Western Infirmary. This had been the home of Shaftesbury before that club ceased playing regular football. As the ground was on University Avenue, it was sometimes called Avenue Park.
