= James McAdam (footballer) =

Scottish footballer (1860–1911)

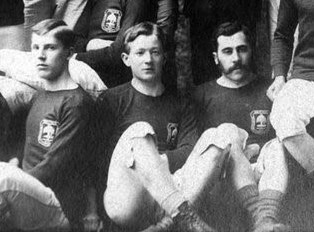
- McAdam (centre) with other members of the Glasgow select team in 1880.

Personal information
- Full name: James McAdam
- Date of birth: 30 March 1860
- Place of birth: Thornliebank, Scotland
- Date of death: 16 October 1911 (aged 51)
- Place of death: New York City, United States
- Position: Right winger

Youth career
- Kerland

Senior career*
Years	Team	Apps	(Gls)
1878–1881	Third Lanark		
1881–1884	Cumbrae		

International career
1880	Scotland	1	(0)
- * Club domestic league appearances and goals

James McAdam (30 March 1860 – 16 October 1911) was a Scottish footballer who played as a right winger.

== Career ==
McAdam played club football for Third Lanark, and made one appearance for Scotland in 1880. A schoolmaster by profession, he worked on the Isle of Cumbrae and played for local teams, and later emigrated to the United States.
