= Kennishead F.C. =

Association football club in Scotland

Kennishead
- Full name: Kennishead Football Club
- Founded: 1875
- Dissolved: 1881
- Ground: Kennishead Park
- Hon. Secretary: Robert Macfarlane
- Match Secretary: John Paterson Jr.
Home colours

Kennishead Football Club was a football club from Thornliebank, Renfrewshire, Scotland.

== History ==
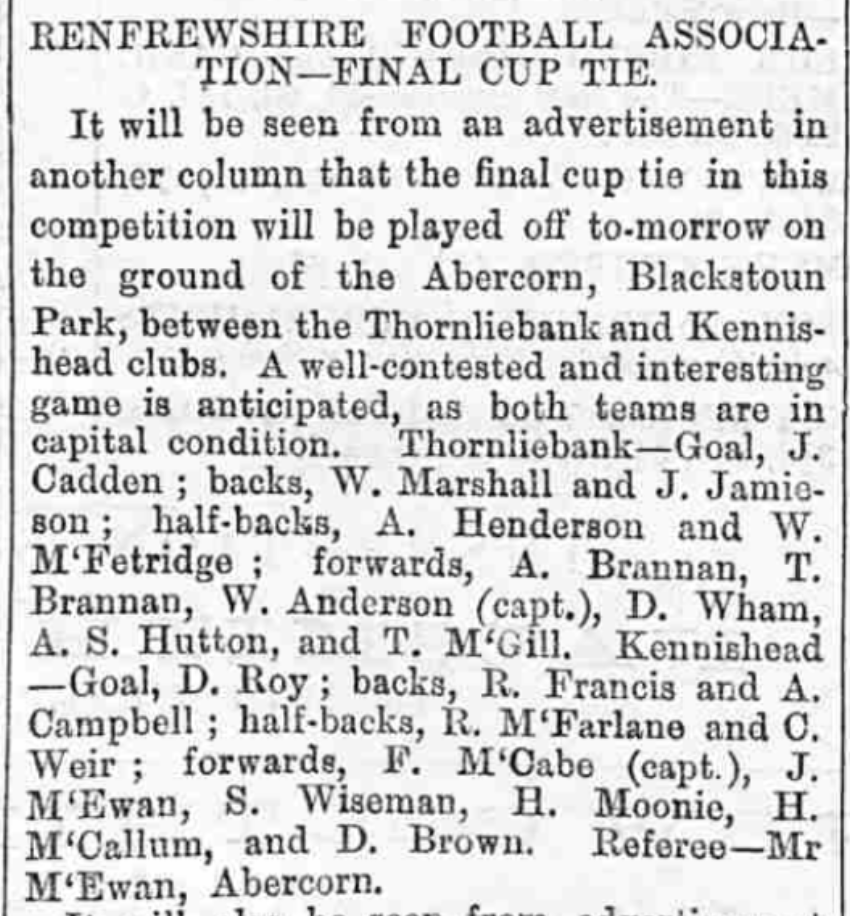
1879–80 Renfrewshire Cup Final teams, Thornliebank v Kennishead, Paisley Daily Express, 16 April 1880

The club was formed in 1875, the same year as village rivals Thornliebank, under the name Caledonia. The club entered the first Renfrewshire Cup in 1878–79, and reached the semi-final against Arthurlie. The Caledonia thrilled the crowd "to the greatest excitement" with a goal from a passing move involving Muirhead, M'Farlane, Wotherspoon, M'Cabe, and Brannan. Arthurlie scored a late equalizer and time ended with Caledonia in front of the Arthurlie goal. The replay however at Dunterlie Park was one-sided, a crowd of 700 seeing Arthurlie win 5–0. Cross-village rivals Thornliebank gained revenge by winning the final.

The club turned senior, by joining the Scottish Football Association, in 1879, only on the condition that it change its name, to avoid confusion with the Caledonian; the club therefore changed its name to Kennishead, after the ground where it played. Its first season as a senior club was its most successful. It reached the third round of the 1879–80 Scottish Cup, after wins over Glenkilloch and Cartside, but came up short at Johnstone Athletic.

Kennishead however went one better than the previous season in the Renfrewshire Cup, its run to the final including a record 12–0 win over Clydevale of Greenock; the home side was so dominant that the Clydevale goalkeeper was singled out for praise, "saving his charge again and again". The final was against holders Thornliebank, played at Abercorn's Blackstoun Park, and Thornliebank duly retained the trophy thanks to two second-half goals.

The match was the club's high peak. The Thornliebank club had, bit by bit, been taking the better players, including the Brannan brothers and McFetridge, from the club; before the start of the 1880–81 season, Thornliebank had also secured the services of McFarlane, Moonie, Wiseman, and captain M'Cabe. The diminution of the side was made obvious by a 6–2 defeat to Cartside in the first round of the Scottish Cup and Kennishead did not even enter the Renfrewshire Cup. Kennishead's final action was entering the 1881–82 Scottish Cup; the club was dissolved before it could play its tie against Yoker.

== Colours ==
The club wore black and white jerseys and hose, and white knickers.

== Grounds ==
The club played at Kennishead Park, a 3-minute walk from Kennishead station.

== Notable players ==
- Bill McFettridge, who played for Caledonia before joining Thornliebank, and later Burnley
