= Glenkilloch F.C. =

Association football club in Glasgow City, Scotland

Glenkilloch
- Full name: Glenkilloch Football Club
- Founded: 1874
- Dissolved: 1882
- Ground: Butterwell Park
- Capacity: 2,000
- Hon. Secretary: William Niven, Robert Pollok
- Match Secretary: Arthur Hughes
Home colours

Glenkilloch Football Club was a Scottish football team, based in Neilston, in Renfrewshire, Scotland.

== History ==
The club was founded in 1874. Its first emergence onto the national stage was in the 1877–78 Scottish Cup, beating Wellington Park 2–0 in its first tie, in a "fast and exciting game", thanks to strikes from J. M'Corkindale and P. Thorpe. In the second the club lost at Renfrew.

The club was one of the founders of the Renfrewshire Football Association in November 1878, and took part in the first Renfrewshire Cup in the 1878–79 season. The club won its first round ties in 1878–79 and 1879–80, but both times lost to Thornliebank in the second round.

The club did not grow in the way others from the county did; in the 1870s it generally had 40 members, on a par with most other clubs, but by 1881 its membership had dropped to 30 and it was far outstripped by most others in the vicinity, the only smaller county club being Netherlee. Despite this, the club reached the third round of the 1881–82 Scottish Cup, the furthest it reached in the competition. Its first round tie at Barrhead was erroneously reported as a 1–1 draw, as Glenkilloch had actually won 2–1.

It was however the club's last entry to the competition. After losing to Cartvale in the third round in October and Port Glasgow Athletic in the second round of the Renfrewshire in November, the club had problems in raising a team; it had to pull out of a friendly with Johnstone Athletic towards the end of November 1881 at the last minute, leaving the home side out of pocket for expenses and a wasted fixture. The formal end to the club came when it was removed from the Scottish FA register for non-payment of subscriptions in August 1882. Senior football in the town was revived when the Neilston club was formed the next season.

== Colours ==
The club wore red and white hooped jerseys and hose, with white knickers.

== Grounds ==
The club played at Butterwell Park, a 15-minute walk from Neilston Low railway station. The ground hosted the first Renfrewshire Cup final, between Arthurlie and Thornliebank, on 26 April 1879; the tie went to a second replay before Thornliebank lifted the trophy.
