= Airdrie F.C. =

Former association football club in Scotland

Airdrie
- Full name: Airdrie Football Club
- Nickname(s): the Hammer Drivers
- Founded: 1868
- Dissolved: 1885
- Ground: Rochsoles
Home colours

Airdrie Football Club was a Scottish association football club based in the town of Airdrie, Lanarkshire.

== History ==
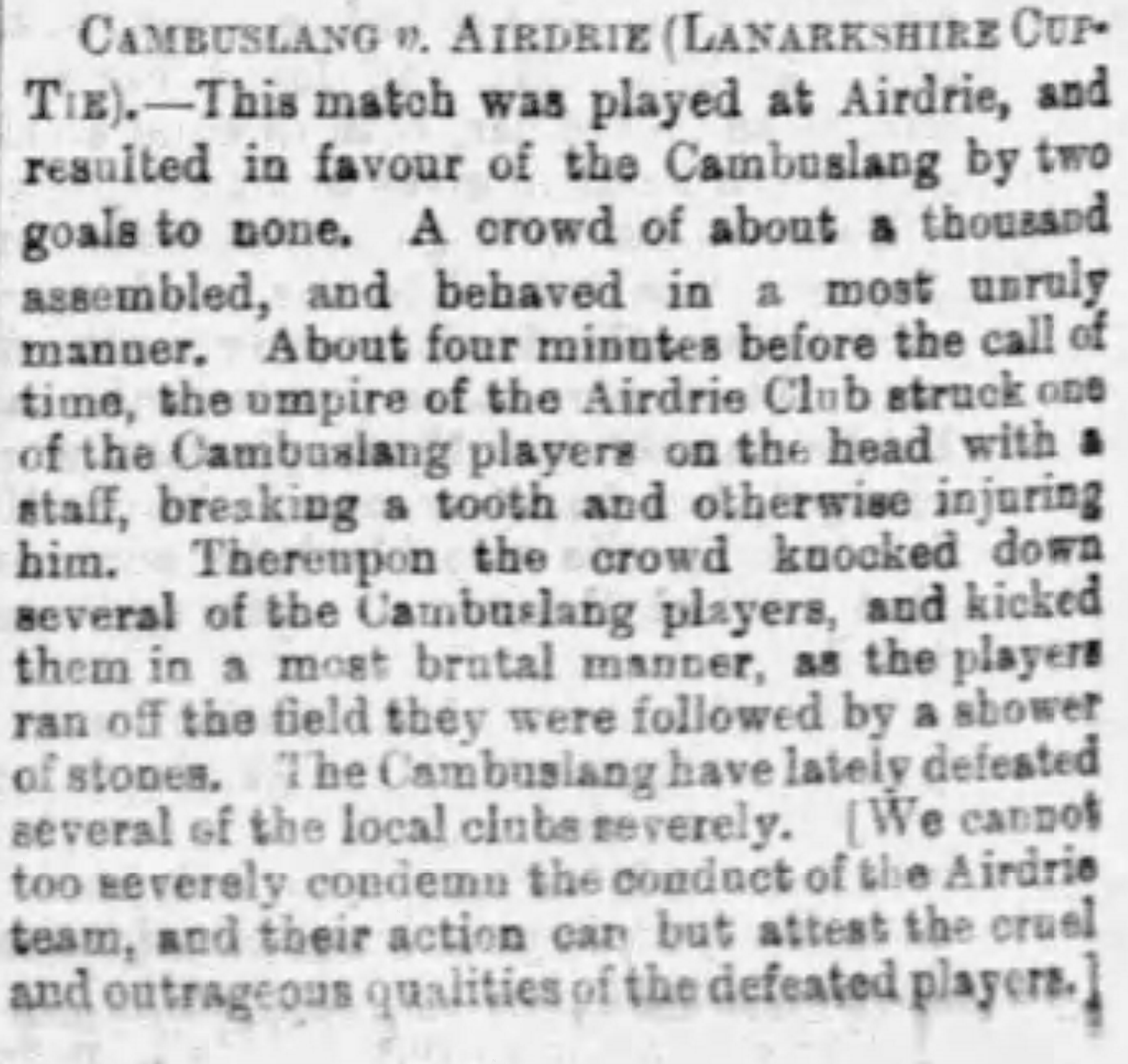
Airdrie 0–2 Cambuslang, 1881–82 Lanarkshire Cup semi-final, from the Rutherglen Reformer, 17 February 1882

The club was founded in 1868. Although not a club with an explicitly Irish identity, the club was formed by Irish workers in the Lanarkshire area, originally played on a field owned by Major Archibald Gerard, a practising Roman Catholic, and tended to attract players of Irish origin.

It was one of the first clubs to play association football in the world. Its match against Queen's Park in June 1870, played to 14 per side, was Queen's Park fourth association match. It remained the only senior club in Airdrie until the foundation of Clarkston in 1877 and Excelsior in 1878.

The club entered the Scottish Cup for the first time in 1875–76, its first Cup tie against Hamilton ending in a goalless draw, although Airdrie played "apparently with the motive that charging was the sole motive and end of the game". Its best runs in the competition came in the three seasons between 1880–81 and 1882–83, when it reached the third round, albeit in 1881–82 thanks in part to a first round bye. In the third round that year, the club held Shotts to a draw in the original tie, which was the closest the club came to the fourth round.

Airdrie was also one of the founder members of the Lanarkshire Football Association, and one of the entrants to the first Lanarkshire Cup in 1879–80. Its best run in the competition was in 1881–82, when it was one of the three semi-finalists, but lost 2–0 to Cambuslang; the game ended prematurely after Airdrie's nominated umpire attacked one of the Cambuslang players, which sparked a general brouhaha. Its biggest competitive win came in the Lanarkshire in 1884, with an 11–0 win at home to Rutherglen Clydesdale.

Despite the head start in the town, Airdrie soon fell behind the other clubs in the locality, given the other clubs' recruitment policies were more catholic than Catholic. Airdrie had 60 members in 1877, but by 1878 its membership had reduced to 25, with Clarkston and Excelsior claiming 30 members each. The club never caught back up with its rivals - indeed by 1881 its membership had dropped to 20 and it was forced to move back to Major Gerard's estate.

The number of games the club played also diminished, with only 5 matches in 1883–84. By 1884 the club was dwarfed by Airdrieonians - the new name for Excelsior - which boasted nearly six times as many members, and even the similarly moribund Airdriehill had a larger membership than Airdrie. Airdrie's last Scottish Cup entry was in 1884–85, and was a first round defeat to Shettleston at neutral Coatbridge; it was Shettletson's only win in 7 Scottish Cup entries. Airdrie's last competitive match was a 7–2 defeat to Airdrieonians in the 1884–85 Lanarkshire Cup second round, and the formal end for the club was its being struck from the SFA's register in August 1885.

== Colours ==
Its original colours were blue and scarlet jerseys and hose, with white knickers.

In 1882 the club changed to white jerseys and knickers with black and white hose; in 1884 it added green tassels to the shirts, and changed the knickers and hose to green, perhaps reflecting its Irish links.

== Grounds ==
The club played at the following grounds:

- 1868: the Rochsoles Estate, owned by Major Gerard
- by 1876: a pitch "three-quarters of a mile from town", the nearest station being South Side
- 1877–78: Academy Park, 200 yards from Airdrie railway station
- 1878–81 : Cairnhill Park, 5 minutes south of the station
- 1881–84: Rochsoles
- 1884–85: Smith's Field, between Airdrie and Coatdyke
