= Jamestown, West Dunbartonshire =

Coordinates: 55.997°N 4.572°W

Jamestown
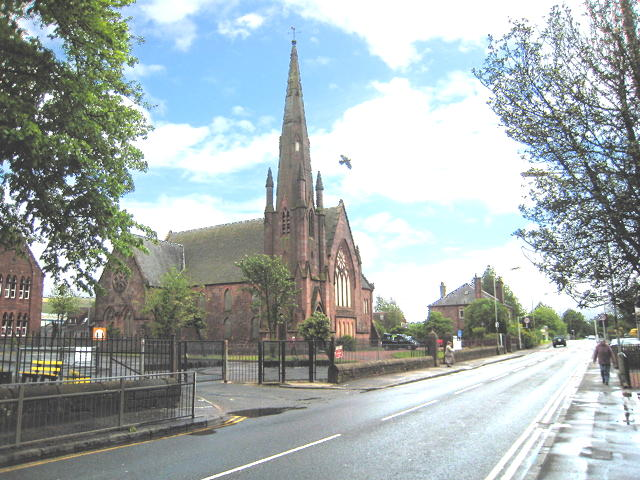
- Jamestown Parish Church, built 1869-70, is a Category B listed building.

- Location within West Dunbartonshire
- OS grid reference: NS3981
- Civil parish: Bonhill
- Council area: West Dunbartonshire
- Lieutenancy area: Dunbartonshire
- Country: Scotland
- Sovereign state: United Kingdom
- Post town: ALEXANDRIA
- Postcode district: G83
- Dialling code: 01389
- Police: Scotland
- Fire: Scottish
- Ambulance: Scottish
- UK Parliament: West Dunbartonshire
- Scottish Parliament: Dumbarton

Jamestown is a village in the Vale of Leven conurbation in West Dunbartonshire, Scotland.

Located on the east bank of the River Leven, it is sandwiched between Balloch to the north and Bonhill to the south.
