= Thornliebank F.C. =

Association football club in Scotland

Thornliebank
- Full name: Thornliebank Football Club
- Nickname: Model Villagers
- Founded: 1875
- Dissolved: 1908
- Ground: Heatherty Hill, Deacon's Bank Park, Summerlee Park
1875–84 colours	1884-1907 colours

Thornliebank Football Club was a football club that existed between 1875 and 1907, based in Thornliebank, Renfrewshire, Scotland.

== History ==
Thornliebank's first recorded fixture was a defeat at the Lancelot club in Glasgow in October 1875, and by January 1876 the club had enough player members to provide two teams. It first entered the Scottish Cup in 1876–77, losing in the first round to the 23rd Renfrew R.V. side from Cathcart. The club gained revenge the following year, beating the 23rd on the way to the 5th round (last 12), where the club lost at Renton. The club had progressed from the fourth round after drawing twice with Hibernian; the Edinburgh club claimed to have won the original tie 2–1, but the Scottish Football Association noted the referee had reported the result as 1–1, so ordered a replay, which was drawn; both clubs were put through to the fifth.

The first Renfrewshire Cup took place in 1878–79. Thornliebank was a favourite in the competition, as the club supplied 4 players to the Renfrewshire representative side for the season's matches against the Ayrshire association. and Thornliebank duly won the competition, a feat it repeated in 1879–80. Thornliebank's second win was at the expense of village rivals Kennishead, the Thornliebank committee being so impressed with the forwards McFarlane, Moonie, Wiseman, and captain M'Cabe that Thornliebank signed them up for 1880–81, an action which effectively killed Kennishead off.

=== 1879–80 Scottish Cup run ===
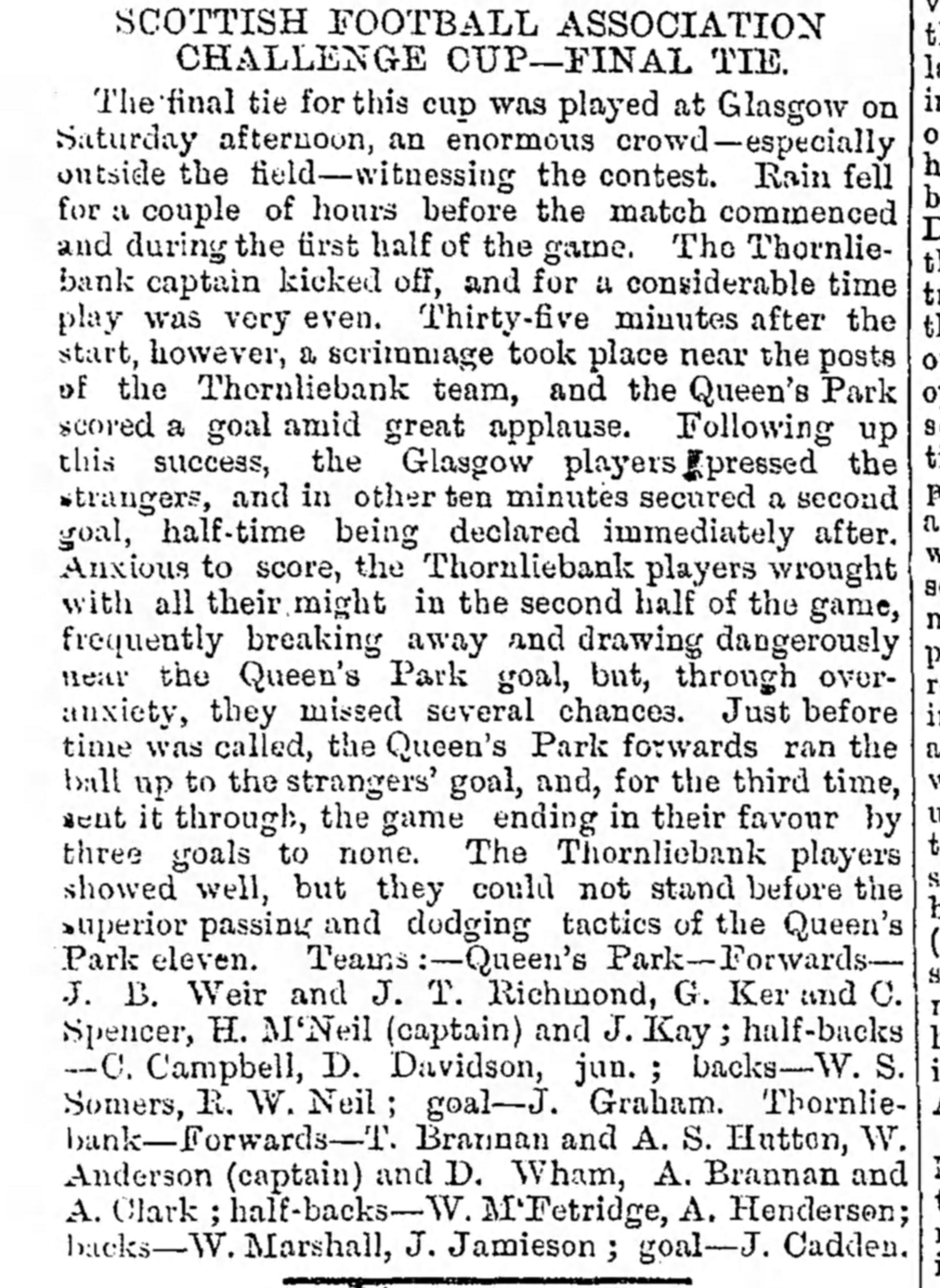
1880 Scottish Cup Final report, Aberdeen Journal, 23 February 1880

That season, the club also reached the Scottish Cup final. After two easy ties, the club struggled to a 1–0 win over Barrhead Rangers, with a breakaway goal five minutes from time. In the fourth round, the club hammered Possilpark by a score given as 12–0 or 13–0; the Rutherglen Reformer noting that "they had nothing to do but score, and they did it". The club also put 12 past Rob Roy of Callander in the fifth round before meeting the 3rd Lanarkshire R.V. in a tie that Thornliebank was not expected to win. After the original tie at Deacon's Bank ended in a draw, and a hurricane-force storm prevented extra-time, the replay took place at Copeland Park in Govan, the home of South-Western, as the Thirds' regular Cathkin Park ground was being used for Scottish FA trial matches. The Thirds thought they had opened the scoring, but the goal was disallowed as they had already claimed for a foul, which was instead given; after 90 minutes, the score was 1–1, so the clubs played an extra 20 minutes. Thornliebank won the game with "a capital shot by Wham, 35 yards off". It was noted that the Thirds were unable to play their usual passing game because of the pressing of Thornliebank, so resorted to long balls, charging, and scrimmaging, which was more Thornliebank's style.

Despite being able to beat the powerful Volunteers, the club was not fancied to beat Pollokshields Athletic in the semi-final. Neutral venues were not used at that time, and the draw had the match played at Thornliebank. The home advantage proved decisive; although Shields took the lead, and generally dominated the game, the ground was "hard as iron, rendering dribbling an impossibility", and the home side scored two late goals to reach the final.

The final however was a step too far, Queen's Park proving too strong in awful conditions. Thornliebank had the previous week made a trip to Vale of Leven F.C. for a warm-up match, in which it suffered its first defeat of the season.

=== Later history ===
The 1879–80 season was the high water mark of the club - it never won the Renfrewshire Cup again and its attempt at the Scottish Cup in 1880–81 ended surprisingly early, with a home defeat by Pollok in the second round. The club's next best run in the Cup came in 1884–85, beaten by Vale of Leven in the quarter-finals, although the club entered until 1907–08; its biggest win had come in the second round in 1883–84, 14–0 against Bute Rangers. The advent of professionalism (often "under the counter") was deleterious to the club - in consecutive ties against Abercorn F.C. in 1888 and 1889, the club conceded 8 and 10 goals. After qualifying rounds were introduced, the club did not reach the main stages of the draw once.

The club replaced Hamilton Academical in the Scottish Football Combination during the 1897–98 season and stayed in the league until 1901, albeit always struggling, and finishing bottom in 1900–01. Thornliebank returned in 1902 but the club did not complete the 1905–06 season. In December 1905, in a match at Alloa, eight Thornliebank players were ordered off for dissent, with 17 minutes to go and the club 8–1 down; the club was also penalized for not turning up to fixtures, and ultimately expelled.

The club's final competitive match came in the 1907–08 Scottish Cup qualifying, against Abercorn; the game was abandoned because of bad light with Abercorn 3–1 up, and the result was allowed to stand. Thornliebank scratched from the consolation cup and was formally dissolved at the end of the season.

== Colours ==
The club originally played in white jerseys with blue knickers, and from 1884 until its demise it wore black and white 1" hoops and blue knickers.

== Grounds ==
The club played at three grounds; originally at Cowglen on Heatherty Hill, and by 1879 the club had moved to Deacon's Bank Park, a 15 minute walk south of Thornliebank railway station, where it played throughout the 1880s. The club's ground in 1895 was at North Bank, and from 1896 Summerlea Park, although these may have been the same ground.

== Honours ==
Scottish Cup

- Runners-up: 1879–80

Renfrewshire Cup

- Winners: 1878–79, 1879–80

Renfrewshire Victoria Cup

- Winners: 1897–98, 1902–03, 1903–04

== Former players ==
=== Scottish League/Football League players ===
- (Scotland) James Bonar
- (Scotland) Paddy Travers
- (Scotland) William McFetridge
- (England) William Brown (Preston North End FC, Tottenham Hotspur FC, Lincoln City FC)
- (Scotland) Neil Lindsay
- (Scotland) William Garside

=== Players with full international caps ===
- (Scotland) Thomas Jackson (whilst at St Mirren FC)
- (Scotland) Robert Downie (whilst at Third Lanark AC)
- (Scotland) Thomas Sloan (whilst at Third Lanark AC)
