= Johnstone Athletic F.C. =

Former association football club in Scotland

Johnstone Athletic
- Full name: Johnstone Athletic Football Club
- Founded: 1878
- Dissolved: 1884
- Ground: Mossbank Park
Home colours

Johnstone Athletic Football Club was a football club based in Johnstone, Renfrewshire, in Scotland.

== History ==
The club was one of three senior clubs in Johnstone formed in 1878, along with Cartside, Johnstone F.C., and Johnstone Rovers. It quickly became the biggest side in the town, with 140 members, compared to Johnstone's 90 and the Rovers' 120, by 1880, which also made it the biggest side in Renfrewshire.

It was the only club from the town to enter the first Renfrewshire Cup, in 1878–79, although the club lost in the first round to the 23rd R.R.V. by 2 goals to 0.

The appetite for football in Johnstone was such that the clubs formed their own Johnstone association, which created a cup competition from 1878 to 1879; the tie between the Athletics and Johnstone in September 1879, which ended 2–2, was attended by a crowd of 2,000, as was the second replay (at Mossdale Park), won 1–0 by Johnstone.

The Athletic was the first in the town to enter the Scottish Cup, doing so in 1879–80. Its first season in the competition was its most successful. After getting a walkover in the first round, the Athletic beat Cartvale 6–0 (plus one disputed) in the second round and Kennishead 3–1 in the third. In the fourth round (final 22) the Athletic lost 4–2 at home to Rob Roy of Callander.

The Athletic entered the Scottish Cup for the next four years, but lost in the first round every time. Its record in the Renfrewshire Cup was little better. Only in 1883–84 did the club win more than one tie; in the first round the club walked off the pitch when 6–3 down to the Sir John Maxwell and lost a replay 2–1 in extra time, but successfully protested that the Sir John had arrived 25 minutes late - despite being at home - and the Sir John was disqualified. In the second the club beat Clippens in a "somewhat rough game" 4–0 but, at 4–1 down to Thornliebank in the quarter-final, the Athletic walked off with 35 minutes to go and put in a protest regarding the weather, to no avail.

With the growth of under-the-counter professionalism, Johnstone was too small a town to host three senior football sides; as early as 1881 the Johnstone chairman, Bailie Love, made tentative suggestions of combining the Johnstone and Athletic teams. The Athletic was the first to dissolve; although it had started out as the largest side in the area, it was soon overtaken in members by Rovers and ability by Johnstone (who won the first three Johnstone & District Cups), and in terms of membership size also by the clubs from Paisley.

The club's last activity was hosting athletic games - which included a 4-a-side tournament, won by Olympic of Greenock - in July 1884. It did not pay its subscription for the 1884–85 season and was removed from the Scottish Football Association roll. The name was taken up by a Junior club in Dundee.

== Colours ==
The club originally played in navy blue jerseys and knickers, and navy blue and white stockings. It adopted white knickers in 1883.

== Ground ==
The club played at Mossbank Park, 5 minutes' walk from the station.
