= Barrhead F.C. =

Former association football club in Scotland

Barrhead
- Full name: Barrhead Football Club
- Founded: 1874; 151 years ago
- Dissolved: 1882; 143 years ago
- Ground: Beacon's Field, Barrhead
Home colours

Barrhead Football Club was a Scottish association football club based in the town of Barrhead, Renfrewshire. The club was founded in 1874 and disbanded in 1882. The club competed in the Scottish Cup for eight seasons between 1874 and 1882. The club's home colours were dark blue shirts with white shorts.
