= 1879–80 Morton F.C. season =

Morton
1879–80 season
- Scottish Cup: Second round (lost to Arthurlie)

The 1879–80 season was Morton Football Club's third season in which they competed at a national level, entering the seventh Scottish Cup.

== Fixtures and results ==
Win Draw Loss Postponed

=== Scottish Cup ===
| 20 September 1879 First Round | Netherlee | 0 – 0 | Morton |

| 27 September 1879 First Round | Morton | 7 – 4 | Netherlee | Cappielow Park |
| | Gillespie,, Ramsay, Barrie; Barr | | ,,, |

| 11 October 1879 First Round | Arthurlie | 8 – 3 | Morton | Dunterlie Park |
| | ,,,,,,, | | ,, |

=== Renfrewshire Cup ===
| 18 October 1879 First Round | Morton | 2 – 3 | Arthurlie | Cappielow Park |
| | Gillespie | | ,, |

=== Friendlies ===
| 13 September 1879 Friendly | Morton | 1 – 2 | John Elder | Cappielow Park |
| | Gillespie | | , |

| 13 September 1879 Friendly | Possil Blue Bell | 4 – 1 | Morton | Hamilton Hill Park |
| | ,,, | | Barr |

| 1 November 1879 Friendly | Morton | 0 – 2 | Orient | Cappielow Park |
| | | | , |

| 22 November 1879 Friendly | Morton | 1 – 2 | Govan | Cappielow Park |
| | Goal | | Stones, Marshall |

| 29 November 1879 Friendly | Wellington Park | 0 – 2 | Morton | Wellington Park |
| | | | Ramsay; Richmond |

| 29 November 1879 Friendly | Ladyburn | 2 – 5 | Morton | Ladyburn Park |
| | , | | ,,,, |

| 17 January 1880 Friendly | Morton | 2 – 1 | Ladyburn | Cappielow Park |
| | Barr; Ramsay | | Goal |

| 14 February 1880 Friendly | Pollok | 5 – 1 | Morton | Broom Park |
| | ,,,, | | Goal |

| 17 April 1880 Friendly | Morton | 5 – 0 | St. Blane | Cappielow Park |
| | ,,,, |

| 24 April 1880 Friendly | Morton | 0 – 3 | Thornliebank | Cappielow Park |
| | | | ,, |
