= 1878–79 Scottish Cup =

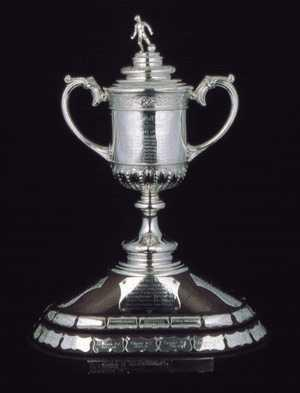
- The Scottish Cup trophy

Tournament details
- Country: Scotland
- Teams: 126

Final positions
- Champions: Vale of Leven (third title)
- Runners-up: Rangers

Tournament statistics
- Matches played: 126
- Goals scored: 566 (4.49 per match)

The 1878–79 Scottish Cup – officially the Scottish Football Association Challenge Cup – was the sixth season of Scotland's most prestigious football knockout competition. Defending champions Vale of Leven met Rangers in the final but, after a 1–1 draw in the original match on 19 April 1879, the replay was scratched and Vale of Leven were awarded the cup. Rangers objected to a goal being disallowed in the original match and refused to play the replay.

This was the second consecutive season that more than 100 teams entered the competition with a record 126 clubs competing.

== Format ==
As with the previous competitions, the sixth edition of the Scottish Cup took on the format of a traditional knockout tournament. For the earlier rounds, the names of competing teams were placed into lots according to their districts and drawn into pairs. The home team for each tie was determined by the toss of a coin unless it was mutually agreed or only one of the two clubs drawn against one another had a private ground. In the event of a draw, the team who lost the toss would have the choice of ground for the replay. A similar procedure was used for subsequent rounds however, any club which had received a bye in the previous round would first be drawn against one of the winners of the previous round. The names of winning teams were placed into one lot for later rounds. The choice of venue for the final matches was reserved to the Scottish Football Association.

=== Calendar ===
The exact dates of some matches are unknown as newspaper coverage of football in the late 19th century was not as comprehensive as it would become.

Round	First match date	Fixtures			Clubs
Round	First match date	Original	Byes	Replays	Clubs
First Round	21 September 1878	59	7	8	126 → 68
Second Round	12 October 1878	33	2	2	68 → 34
Third Round	2 November 1878	16	2	0	34 → 18
Fourth Round	30 November 1878	9	0	1	18 → 10
Fifth Round	22 December 1878	5	0	0	10 → 5
Quarter-finals	22 March 1879	2	1	0	5 → 3
Semi-finals	29 March 1879	1	1	0	3 → 2
Final	19 April 1879	1	0	0	2 → 1

- Both Glasgow and Edinburgh University were given byes to the third round.
- Clydesdale and Dennistoun were both disqualified from the competition without playing their first round tie.
- Six teams qualified for the second round after drawing their first round replay.
- Glengowan and Airdrie were both disqualified from the competition after their second round tie.
- Both Partick and Stonelaw were reinstated in the fifth round after Thistle were disqualified.

== Teams ==
All 126 teams entered the competition in the first round.

Ayrshire	Dunbartonshire	Glasgow and Suburbs		Lanarkshire	Renfrewshire
Auchinleck Boswell; Ayr Academicals; Ayr Thistle; Beith; Catrine; Cumnock; Dean; Girvan; Hurlford; Kilbirnie; Kilmarnock; Kilmarnock Athletic; Kilmarnock Portland; Lanemark; Mauchline; Maybole Carrick; Maybole Ladywell; Tarbolton Burntonians	Alclutha; Alexandria; Dumbarton; Helensburgh; Jamestown; Kilmaronock Thistle; Lennox; Renton; Renton Thistle; Star of Leven; Vale of Leven; 10th Dumbarton RV	Ailsa; Albatross; Alexandra Athletic; Blackfriars; Blythswood; Burnside; Caledonian; Clyde; Clydesdale; Dennistoun; Derby; Glasgow University; Govan; Govanhill Lacrosse; Havelock; John Elder; Jordanhill; Kelvinbank; Northern; Oxford; Parkgrove	Partick; Petershill; Pollokshields Athletic; Possil Bluebell; Possilpark; Queen's Park; Rangers; Rosslyn; Shaftesbury; South Western; Stonefield; Telegraphists; Thistle; Union; Wellpark; Whitefield; Whiteinch; 1st Lanark RV; 3rd Lanark RV; 4th Renfrew RV; 19th Lanark RV	Airdrie; Avondale; Clarkston; Drumpellier; East Kilbride; Glengowan; Hamilton Academical; Mount Vernon; Newmains; Shotts; Stonelaw; Uddingston; Upper Clydesdale	Arthurlie; Barrhead; Busby; Cartvale; Glenkilloch; Levern; Morton; Pollokshaws; Port Glasgow; Renfrew; Thornliebank; Wellington Park; 17th Renfrew RV; 23rd Renfrew RV
Dumfriesshire	Edinburgh	Forfarshire	Perthshire	Stirlingshire	Wigtownshire
Annan Wanderers; Queen of the South Wanderers	Brunswick; Dunfermline; Edinburgh Thistle; Edinburgh University; Hanover; Heart of Midlothian; Hibernian; Swifts; 3rd Edinburgh RV	Arbroath; Dundee Our Boys; St Clement's	Clifton & Strathfillan; Coupar Angus; Rob Roy; Vale of Teith	Campsie Glen; Falkirk; Grasshoppers; Lenzie; Shaughraun; Strathblane; Thistle Athletic	Cree Rovers; Stranraer

== First round ==
In total, there were 59 first round ties after five teams received a bye to the second round, Pollokshaws disbanded before the competition began and Glasgow University and Edinburgh University received a bye to the third round. However, only 51 ties were played after Girvan, Blythswood, Stranraer, Maybole Carrick, Star of Leven, 4th Renfrew RV and Govanhill Lacrosse scratched to Catrine, Clyde, Cree Rovers, Mauchline, Renton, Stonefield and Wellpark respectively. Dennistoun were drawn to play Clydesdale but both teams scratched and were eliminated from the competition.

Two-time defending champions Vale of Leven began the competition with a 6–0 home win against Alclutha from Dumbarton on 21 September 1878. On the same day, Queen's Park – who were looking to regain the trophy they had last won in 1876 – had a similarly convincing win as they saw off Kelvinbank 8–0. Rangers defeated Shaftesbury 3–0 at Kinning Park a week later while there were big wins for Kilmarnock Portland (9–0 vs. Dean), Upper Clydesdale (12–0 vs. Newmains) and Whitefield (10–0 vs. Telegraphists).

=== Matches ===
==== Dumfriesshire district ====
5 October 1878	Annan Wanderers	0–3	Queen of the South Wanderers	Annan

==== Wigtownshire district ====
Cree Rovers	w/o	Stranraer

==== Ayrshire district ====
21 September 1878	Kilmarnock Portland	9–0	Dean	Kilmarnock
				Stadium: Hamilton Park

28 September 1878	Ayr Academicals	4–1	Cumnock	Ayr
				Stadium: Springvale Park

28 September 1878	Auchinleck Boswell	0–2	Ayr Thistle	Auchinleck
				Stadium: Glenshamrock Park

28 September 1878	Beith	1–0	Hurlford	Beith
				Stadium: Gateside Toll

28 September 1878	Kilmarnock	0–2	Kilbirnie	Kilmarnock
				Stadium: Rugby Park

28 September 1878	Lanemark	2–2	Kilmarnock Athletic	New Cumnock
				Stadium: Connell Park

5 October 1878	Maybole Ladywell	3–0	Tarbolton Burntonians	Maybole

Catrine	w/o	Girvan

Mauchline	w/o	Maybole Carrick

==== Glasgow and Suburbs ====
Burnside received a bye to the second round and Glasgow University to the third round.

21 September 1878	Possil Bluebell	8–0	19th Lanark RV	Possilpark
				Stadium: Hamilton Hill Park

21 September 1878	Queen's Park	8–0	Kelvinbank	Crosshill
				Stadium: Hampden Park

21 September 1878	Thistle	2–0	Possilpark	Glasgow
				Stadium: Glasgow Green

28 September 1878	1st Lanark RV	0–0	Parkgrove	Glasgow
				Stadium: Burnbank Park

28 September 1878	Alexandra Athletic	3–1	Jordanhill	Glasgow
				Stadium: Kennyhill Park

28 September 1878	Govan	7–0	Ailsa	Govan
				Stadium: Moore Park

28 September 1878	Havelock	1–7	3rd Lanark RV	Govan
				Stadium: Middleton Park

28 September 1878	Blackfriars	0–7	John Elder	Glasgow
				Stadium: Belvedere Park

28 September 1878	Derby	0–0	Oxford	Glasgow
				Stadium: Craigbank Park

28 September 1878	Northern	2–2	Partick	Glasgow
				Stadium: Hyde Park

28 September 1878	Petershill	4–2	Albatross	Glasgow
				Stadium: Avenue Park

28 September 1878	Rangers	3–0	Shaftesbury	Kinning Park
	Struthers			Stadium: Kinning Park

28 September 1878	Rosslyn	0–1	Union	Partick
				Stadium: Merkland Park

28 September 1878	Pollokshields Athletic	3–3	Whiteinch	Pollokshields
				Stadium: Pollok Park

28 September 1878	Whitefield	10–0	Telegraphists	Govan
				Stadium: Whitefield Park

5 October 1878	South Western	2–0	Caledonian	Govan
				Stadium: Copeland Park

Clyde	w/o	Blythswood

Clydesdale	–	Dennistoun

Wellpark	w/o	Govanhill Lacrosse

Stonefield	w/o	4th Renfrew RV

==== Edinburgh district ====
Edinburgh University received a bye to the third round.

21 September 1878	Heart of Midlothian	3–1	Swifts	Edinburgh
				Stadium: Powburn

28 September 1878	3rd Edinburgh RV	3–1	Brunswick	Edinburgh
				Stadium: Powburn

28 September 1878	Edinburgh Thistle	2–1	Hanover	Edinburgh
				Stadium: East Meadows

28 September 1878	Hibernian	5–2	Dunfermline	Edinburgh
	Donnelly			Stadium: The Meadows

==== Dunbartonshire district ====
21 September 1878	Jamestown	3–1	Lennox	Jamestown
				Stadium: Balloch Road

21 September 1878	Vale of Leven	6–0	Alclutha	Alexandria
				Stadium: North Street Park

28 September 1878	Alexandria	2–2	Renton Thistle	Alexandria
				Stadium: Balloch Road

28 September 1878	Dumbarton	8–1	10th Dumbarton RV	Dumbarton
				Stadium: Townend

5 October 1878	Helensburgh	4–0	Kilmaronock Thistle	Helensburgh
				Stadium: Kirkmichael Park

Renton	w/o	Star of Leven

==== Lanarkshire district ====
Clarkston received a bye to the second round.

28 September 1878	Avondale	0–7	Airdrie	Strathaven
				Stadium: Townhead Park

28 September 1878	Glengowan	4–3	Mount Vernon	Caldercruix
				Stadium: Little Dumbreck

28 September 1878	Hamilton Academical	0–0	Uddingston	Hamilton
				Stadium: South Haugh

28 September 1878	Newmains	0–12	Upper Clydesdale	Newmains
				Stadium: Brown Street

5 October 1878	Shotts	3–0	Drumpellier	Shotts
				Stadium: Calderhead

5 October 1878	Stonelaw	4–0	East Kilbride	Rutherglen
				Stadium: Burnside Park

==== Renfrewshire district ====
21 September 1878	Barrhead	2–0	Wellington Park	Barrhead
				Stadium: Beacon's Field

28 September 1878	Cartvale	1–4	Arthurlie	Busby
				Stadium: Overlee Park

28 September 1878	Busby	3–1	Morton	Busby
				Stadium: Cartsbridge Park

28 September 1878	Levern	1–1	23rd Renfrew RV	Hurlet
				Stadium: Wellington Park

28 September 1878	Renfrew	1–1	17th Renfrew RV	Renfrew
				Stadium: Glebe Park

28 September 1878	Thornliebank	3–0	Glenkilloch	Thornliebank
				Stadium: Heatherty Hill

Port Glasgow	w/o	Pollokshaws

==== Stirlingshire district ====
Shaugraun received a bye to the second round.

28 September 1878	Falkirk	1–0	Campsie Glen	Falkirk
				Stadium: Randyford Park

28 September 1878	Lenzie	3–0	Thistle Athletic	Lenzie
				Stadium: Lenzie Football Field

5 October 1878	Strathblane	8–1	Grasshoppers	Blanefield
				Stadium: Cuilt Park

==== Forfarshire district ====
St Clement's received a bye to the second round.

28 September 1878	Arbroath	3–0	Dundee Our Boys	Arbroath
				Stadium: Woodville Park

==== Perthshire district ====
5 October 1878	Rob Roy	1–0	Coupar Angus	Perth
				Stadium: North Inch

5 October 1878	Clifton & Strathfillan	0–1	Vale of Teith	Tyndrum
				Stadium: Private Park

=== Replays ===
==== Ayrshire district ====
5 October 1878	Kilmarnock Athletic	4–0	Lanemark	Kilmarnock
				Stadium: Holm Quarry

==== Glasgow and Suburbs ====
5 October 1878	Parkgrove	6–2	1st Lanark RV	Govan
				Stadium: Trinidad Park

5 October 1878	Oxford	1–1	Derby	Crosshill
				Stadium: Queen's Park

5 October 1878	Partick	2–0	Northern	Partick
				Stadium: Inchview

5 October 1878	Whiteinch	3–3	Pollokshields Athletic	Partick
				Stadium: Westburn Park

==== Dunbartonshire district ====
5 October 1878	Renton Thistle	1–1	Alexandria	Renton
				Stadium: Southend Park

==== Lanarkshire district ====
5 October 1878	Hamilton Academical	3–1	Uddingston	Hamilton
				Stadium: South Haugh

==== Renfrewshire district ====
5 October 1878	23rd Renfrew RV	0–1	Levern	Cathcart
				Stadium: Muirland Park

5 October 1878	17th Renfrew RV	1–2	Renfrew	Lochwinnoch
				Stadium: Barr Castle Park

Notes

1. A-Both sides withdrew from the competition.
2. B-Both teams advanced to the second round.

== Second round ==
The second round began on 12 October 1878 with Govan's 2–1 over Oxford. Most of the ties were played a week later. Queen's Park defeated Pollokshields Athletic 6–0 at Hampden Park while Rangers won 6–1 at home to Whitefield. Vale of Leven recorded the biggest win of the round as they thumped Renton Thistle 11–0 at North Street Park on 26 October.

With an even number of teams in the draw, no byes were awarded but not every team would play a match. St Clement's scratched from their tie with Arbroath before Shotts scratched from their replay with Clarkston after the teams had drawn 1–1 on 19 October. Glengowan defeated Airdrie 2–0 away from home but neither side advanced as both were disqualified and, despite losing 5–0 to South Western, a protest from Petershill was upheld and a replay was ordered. South Western also won the replay 8–0.

=== Matches ===
==== Glasgow and Suburbs ====
Glasgow University received a bye to the third round.

12 October 1878	Govan	2–1	Oxford	Govan
				Stadium: Moore Park

19 October 1878	Alexandra Athletic	3–0	Burnside	Glasgow
				Stadium: Kennyhill Park

19 October 1878	South Western	5–0 (Void)	Petershill	Govan
				Stadium: Copeland Park

19 October 1878	Partick	2–1	Possil Bluebell	Partick
				Stadium: Inchview

19 October 1878	Rangers	6–1	Whitefield	Kinning Park
				Stadium: Kinning Park

19 October 1878	Clyde	1–4	Thistle	Glasgow
				Stadium: Barrowfield Park

19 October 1878	Whiteinch	1–3	Derby	Partick
				Stadium: Westburn Park

19 October 1878	Parkgrove	1–0	Union	Govan
				Stadium: Trinidad Park

19 October 1878	John Elder	4–0	Stonefield	Govan
				Stadium: Fairfield

19 October 1878	3rd Lanark RV	8–1	Wellpark	Crosshill
				Stadium: Cathkin Park

19 October 1878	Queen's Park	6–0	Pollokshields Athletic	Crosshill
				Stadium: Hampden Park

==== Ayrshire district ====
19 October 1878	Beith	3–1	Ayr Thistle	Beith
				Stadium: Gateside Toll

19 October 1878	Catrine	3–1	Maybole Ladywell	Catrine
				Stadium: Burn Park

19 October 1878	Kilbirnie	0–2	Kilmarnock Athletic	Kilbirnie
				Stadium: Stonyholm Park

19 October 1878	Ayr Academicals	1–5	Mauchline	Ayr
				Stadium: Springvale Park

==== Renfrewshire district ====
19 October 1878	Kilmarnock Portland	4–1	Thornliebank	Kilmarnock
				Stadium: Hamilton Park

19 October 1878	Arthurlie	3–1	Busby	Barrhead
				Stadium: Arthurlie Cross

19 October 1878	Levern	1–2	Renfrew	Hurlet
				Stadium: Wellington Park

19 October 1878	Barrhead	6–2	Port Glasgow	Barrhead
				Stadium: Beacon's Field

==== Lanarkshire district ====
19 October 1878	Shotts	1–1	Clarkston	Shotts
				Stadium: Calderhead

19 October 1878	Stonelaw	2–0	Hamilton Academical	Rutherglen
				Stadium: Burnside Park

26 October 1878	Glengowan	2–0	Airdrie	Caldercruix
				Stadium: Little Dumbreck

==== Edinburgh district ====
Edinburgh University received a bye to the third round.

19 October 1878	Hibernian	3–0	3rd Edinburgh RV	Edinburgh
	Quinn; Donnelly; Heron			Stadium: The Meadows

19 October 1878	Heart of Midlothian	1–0	Edinburgh Thistle	Edinburgh
				Stadium: Powburn

==== Dunbartonshire district ====
19 October 1878	Renton	1–6	Dumbarton	Renton
	Loy		Grant; McMaster; Galbraith; Lawrence; Own goal (x2)	Stadium: Tontine Park; Attendance: 4,000

19 October 1878	Helensburgh	4–1	Alexandria	Helensburgh
				Stadium: Kirkmichael Park

19 October 1878	Jamestown	7–0	Upper Clydesdale	Jamestown
				Stadium: Balloch Road

26 October 1878	Vale of Leven	11–0	Renton Thistle	Alexandria
				Stadium: North Street Park

==== Stirlingshire district ====
19 October 1878	Strathblane	1–0	Falkirk	Blanefield
				Stadium: Cuilt Park

19 October 1878	Shaugraun	1–0	Lenzie	Campsie
				Stadium: Brassburn Park

==== Forfarshire district ====
Arbroath	w/o	St Clement's

==== Perthshire district ====
26 October 1878	Rob Roy	3–1	Vale of Teith	Callander
				Stadium: Garmhor Park

==== Wigtownshire and Dumfriesshire districts ====
26 October 1878	Cree Rovers	0–3	Queen of the South Wanderers	Newton Stewart
				Stadium: Barn Park

=== Replays ===
==== Glasgow and Suburbs ====
26 October 1878	South Western	8–0	Petershill	Govan
				Stadium: Copeland Park

==== Lanarkshire district ====
Clarkston	w/o	Shotts

Notes

1. C-Both sides were disqualified from the competition after the referee stopped the match early because of violent play.
2. D-Abandoned after 30 minutes. 3rd Edinburgh RV conceded the tie.

== Third round ==
Two teams received a bye to the fourth round while Glasgow University scratched from their tie with Queen's Park. The third round began on 2 November 1878 as 3rd Lanark RV defeated South Western 2–1 at Cathkin Park. A week later, free-scoring Vale of Leven took their tally for the competition to 32 goals after a thumping 15–0 win over Jamestown at North Street Park setting a new Scottish Cup record for the biggest margin of victory in the process. Rangers defeated Parkgrove 8–2 while Beith recorded a 7–1 triumph over Barrhead.

Although Thistle defeated Partick 2–1 on 16 November and did play in and win their fourth round tie, they were later disqualified from the competition with Partick reinstated in the fifth round.

=== Matches ===
==== Glasgow and Suburbs ====
2 November 1878	3rd Lanark RV	2–1	South Western	Crosshill
				Stadium: Cathkin Park

9 November 1878	Rangers	8–2	Parkgrove	Kinning Park
	Dunlop; Hill (x3); Struthers (x3); Campbell			Stadium: Kinning Park; Attendance: 3,000

9 November 1878	Alexandra Athletic	2–0	John Elder	Glasgow
				Stadium: Kennyhill Park

9 November 1878	Govan	4–0	Derby	Govan
				Stadium: Moore Park

16 November 1878	Partick	1–2	Thistle	Partick
				Stadium: Inchview

Queen's Park	w/o	Glasgow University

==== Ayrshire, Dumfriesshire and Renfrewshire districts ====
Renfrew received a bye to the fourth round.

9 November 1878	Catrine	0–3	Kilmarnock Portland	Catrine
				Stadium: Burn Park

9 November 1878	Beith	7–1	Barrhead	Beith
				Stadium: Gateside Toll

9 November 1878	Mauchline	4–1	Arthurlie	Mauchline
				Stadium: Connel Park

16 November 1878	Kilmarnock Athletic	5–0	Queen of the South Wanderers	Kilmarnock
				Stadium: Holm Quarry

==== Lanarkshire, Dunbartonshire, Stirlingshire and Perthshire districts ====
Rob Roy received a bye to the fourth round.

9 November 1878	Stonelaw	1–0	Clarkston	Rutherglen
				Stadium: Burnside Park

9 November 1878	Helensburgh	2–0	Shaugraun	Helensburgh
				Stadium: Kirkmichael Park

9 November 1878	Dumbarton	5–0	Strathblane	Dumbarton
				Stadium: Townend

9 November 1878	Vale of Leven	15–0	Jamestown	Alexandria
				Stadium: North Street Park

==== Edinburgh and Forfarshire districts ====
16 November 1878	Edinburgh University	2–5	Hibernian	Edinburgh
			Flynn (x2); Rourke (x3)	Stadium: Craiglockart

9 November 1878	Heart of Midlothian	2–1	Arbroath	Edinburgh
				Stadium: Powburn

== Fourth round ==
Most fourth round ties were played on 30 November 1878 and, with an even number of teams, there were no byes awarded. Vale of Leven continued their fine form, recording a third consecutive double-figures win, as they defeated Govan 11–1 conceding a goal for the first time in the process. Beith were the last Ayrshire team standing after thumping Kilmarnock Athletic 9–1 while Mauchline lost 5–0 to Queen's Park and Kilmarnock Portland lost 6–1 in a replay to Dumbarton. Similarly, Hibernian became the last Edinburgh club standing after thumping Rob Roy 9–0 while Heart of Midlothian lost 2–1 to Helensburgh. Rangers defeated Alexandra Athletic 3–0.

Thistle, who had defeated Partick in the previous round, were disqualified from the competition following their 2–0 win over Stonelaw and both Partick and Stonelaw were reinstated.

=== Matches ===
30 November 1878	Renfrew	0–4	3rd Lanark RV	Renfrew
				Stadium: Glebe Park

30 November 1878	Vale of Leven	11–1	Govan	Alexandria
				Stadium: North Street Park

30 November 1878	Queen's Park	5–0	Mauchline	Crosshill
				Stadium: Hampden Park

30 November 1878	Thistle	2–0	Stonelaw	Glasgow
				Stadium: Glasgow Green

30 November 1878	Kilmarnock Portland	1–1	Dumbarton	Kilmarnock
				Stadium: Hamilton Park

30 November 1878	Rangers	3–0	Alexandra Athletic	Kinning Park
	Dunlop; McQuarrie			Stadium: Kinning Park

30 November 1878	Helensburgh	2–1	Heart of Midlothian	Helensburgh
				Stadium: Kirkmichael Park

30 November 1878	Beith	9–1	Kilmarnock Athletic	Beith
				Stadium: Gateside Toll

7 December 1878	Hibernian	9–0	Rob Roy	Edinburgh
				Stadium: The Meadows

=== Replay ===
7 December 1878	Dumbarton	6–1	Kilmarnock Portland	Dumbarton
				Stadium: Townend

Notes

1. E-Thistle were disqualified from the competition and both Stonelaw and Partick were reinstated.

== Fifth round ==
All five fifth round matches were played on 8 March 1879. Dumbarton reached the quarter-finals for the first time in three seasons with a 9–1 win at home to Stonelaw while fellow Dunbartonshire club Helensburgh defeated the last remaining Edinburgh side, Hibernian, 2–1 away from home. Queen's Park played 3rd Lanark RV in a replay of the 1876 final at Hampden Park and they eased through with a 5–0 win while Rangers defeated Partick 4–0. Holders Vale of Leven defeated Beith 6–1 at North Street Park.

=== Matches ===
8 March 1879	Vale of Leven	6–1	Beith	Alexandria
				Stadium: North Street Park

8 March 1879	Stonelaw	1–9	Dumbarton	Rutherglen
				Stadium: Burnside Park

8 March 1879	Hibernian	1–2	Helensburgh	Edinburgh
	Donnelly			Stadium: The Meadows

8 March 1879	Queen's Park	5–0	3rd Lanark RV	Crosshill
				Stadium: Hampden Park

8 March 1879	Rangers	4–0	Partick	Kinning Park
	Hill; Steel; Angus (x2)			Stadium: Kinning Park

== Quarter-finals ==
With just five teams left, there were only two quarter-final ties and Helensburgh received a bye to the semi-finals. Both games were played on 22 March 1879. Queen's Park's quest to regain the trophy was ended by Glasgow rivals Rangers as Dunlop scored the only of the game at Hampden Park to see them through to the semi-finals. They were joined by Vale of Leven as the defending champions eased passed Dunbartonshire rivals Dumbarton with a 3–1 win at North Street Park.

=== Matches ===
22 March 1879	Queen's Park	0–1	Rangers	Crosshill
			Dunlop	Stadium: Hampden Park

22 March 1879	Vale of Leven	3–1	Dumbarton	Alexandria
			Lindsay	Stadium: North Street Park; Attendance: 6,000

== Semi-final ==
For the third consecutive season, there was just one semi-final played and Rangers, for the second time, received a bye to the final. Helensburgh hosted Dunbartonshire rivals Vale of Leven but they were no match for a Vale side targeting a third consecutive title as they succumbed to a 3–0 loss at Kirkmichael Park.

=== Matches ===
29 March 1879	Helensburgh	0–3	Vale of Leven	Helensburgh
				Stadium: Kirkmichael Park

== Final ==
Hampden Park in Glasgow again played host to the Scottish Cup final as Vale of Leven faced Rangers in a rematch of the 1877 final on 19 April 1879. That tie took three matches to decide and it initially looked like this year's final would be no different after goals from Struthers and Ferguson saw the teams draw 1–1 in front of 6,000 spectators. However, Rangers had been incensed by the referee's decision to disallow a goal and refused to play the replay, scheduled for 26 April. As a result, Vale of Leven were awarded the trophy, their third success in three years.

=== Original match ===
19 April 1879
15:00

Vale of Leven	1–1	Rangers
Ferguson		Struthers 12'

Hampden Park, Crosshill
Attendance: 6,000

=== Replay ===
26 April 1879

Vale of Leven	w/o	Rangers

== See also ==
- 1878–79 in Scottish football
