= Ailsa F.C. =

Former association football club in Scotland

Ailsa
- Full name: Ailsa Football Club
- Founded: 1874
- Dissolved: 1880
- Ground: Buckingham Park
- President: A. Dunlop
- Secretary: David Dunlop
- Captain: W. Dyet
Home colours

Ailsa Football Club was a 19th-century association football club originally based at Pollokshields, in Glasgow.

== History ==
The club was founded in 1874 and took its name from the rock of Ailsa Craig, and its first reported matches come from the 1875–76 season. It was one of the smaller Glasgow clubs, with a membership of 30 in 1876, more only than Shawfield and Union at the time.

The club first entered the Scottish Cup in 1877–78, losing 2–0 to Lenzie. Ailsa also lost in the first round the following year, 7–0 at Govan, although the North British Daily Mail report incorrectly referred to Ailsa as "Woodburn".

In the 1879–80 Scottish Cup, the club reached the third round; after a walkover in the first, Ailsa beat Rosslyn 3–1, but lost 6–0 at Clyde in the third, even though Clyde played with ten men for the second half.

It was the club's last Cup fixture. Although it did enter the 1880–81 Scottish Cup, it scratched to the Good Templars Harmonic.

A new Ailsa club, with no known link to the original, played in Anniesland in the 1892–93 season.

== Colours ==
The club's colours were pale blue and white 1-inch hooped shirts and stockings, with white knickerbockers.

== Ground ==
The club originally played at a private ground in Pollokshields. In 1878 the club moved to Buckingham Park off Copeland Road, Govan.
