= Milton of Campsie F.C. =

Former association football club in Scotland

Shaughraun/Milton of Campsie
- Full name: Shaughraun Football Club/Milton of Campsie Football Club
- Founded: 1876
- Dissolved: 1882
- Ground: Glazert Bank Park
- Hon. Secretary: R. B. Cochrane, Allan Baird
Shaughraun colours	Milton of Campsie colours

Milton of Campsie Football Club was a football team from Milton of Campsie, Stirlingshire.

== Shaughraun ==
The club was formed in 1876 under the name Shaughraun; it was the second senior club founded in Stirlingshire, after Bonnybridge Grasshoppers. The name is Irish for "wanderers" and was the name of a play which had been a fixture in London theatres from 1875. The spelling caused problems for newspapers as it was often rendered as Shaughran.

It was one of 36 clubs to join the Scottish Football Association in September 1877.

Shaughraun entered the Scottish Cup twice under its original name. In 1877–78, in the only tie in the Stirlingshire district, it lost 2–1 at Clifton & Strathfillan; there was a dispute as to the amount of time played when the game was brought to a halt, but the score stood. The following season Shaughraun beat Lenzie in the second round (having had a bye in the first). The third round tie at Helensburgh ended in the first half; Shaughraun walked off in protest at the second Helensburgh goal being awarded.

== Milton of Campsie ==
In 1879 the club changed its name to Milton of Campsie, retaining Allan Baird as club secretary and keeping its facilities at Mrs Whitehead's Inn. It reached the second round of the Cup under that name in 1879–80, but lost a 4–0 win at home to Campsie Glen. Milton of Campsie lodged a protest on the basis that the referee had given a decision before anyone had appealed for it, in breach of the then Law XIII. Not only did the Association dismiss the protest, it reprimanded Milton of Campsie for "the language used in the protest against the referee".

The club's last Scottish Cup entry in 1881–82 was its best; for the first time, the club won two ties in the same competition, and thanks to a bye, it made the fourth round (last 27). The club had to win its second round tie against Lenzie twice, the original win being overturned on the basis that the pitch was covered in stones and not a fit state for football. Lenzie had the choice of venue for the replay, but as its own ground was occupied, got permission from Thomas Allan, owner of Kincaid House in Milton of Campsie, to host the match on a field near the house, which had formerly been a bowling green. Lenzie's "very refined game" was no match for the more brutal Milton style, and Milton of Campsie won 2–0. In the third round the club lost 3–1 at Falkirk.

Before the 1882–83 season, the club was removed from the Scottish Football Association roll for non-payment of subscriptions. The name was revived twice more; in 1885, for a club playing at French Mill, and in 1890, for a senior club playing at Cannerton Park, but these seem to have had no link (other than geographical) to the original club.

== Colours ==
The club's first colours were red, white, and blue. In 1878 they changed to green "ganzies", white knickers, and blue hose. In 1880 the club changed its jerseys to blue, which seems to have been a navy blue, with white knickers and red hose.

== Ground ==
The club played at the following grounds:

- 1876–77: Lochmill
- 1877–78: Brassburn Park
- 1878–79, 1880–82: Glazert Bank Park, near French mill.
- 1879–80: West Baldorran Park
