= Possil Bluebell F.C. =

Former association football club in Scotland

Possil Bluebell
- Full name: Possil Bluebell Football Club
- Nickname(s): the Blue Bell
- Founded: 1878
- Dissolved: 1881
- Ground: Hamilton Hill Park
- Secretary: John Wren, William Robertson
Home colours

Possil Bluebell Football Club was a 19th-century football club from the Possilpark area of Glasgow in Scotland.

== History ==
The club was founded in 1878, with the name originally stylized as Possil Blue Bell. With 28 members in its first season, the club was the second-smallest known senior club in Glasgow, only Union known to have been smaller. The club still only had 38 members in its second season.

Notwithstanding its size, the club entered the 1878–79 Scottish Cup, and enjoyed an 8–0 win over the 19th L.R.V. in the first round. The club lost 2–1 at Partick in the second, the home side having a third chalked off and the Blue Bell goal being a consolation with ten minutes to go - the Partick goalkeeper only touched the ball on two other occasions.

The club made the second round again the following season, albeit thanks to the Telegraphists ceding the first round tie. Given little chance against the 3rd L.R.V., the Bluebell put up a remarkable fight, holding the Hi-Hi to a goalless draw at the original Cathkin Park thanks to "capital back play" and only losing 1–0 in the replay, held at Govanhill; the Volunteers' superior fitness told as the Blue Bell dominated the first half, the Hi-Hi the second.

However that was as good as it got for the club; with other clubs in Glasgow and its environs emerging, a small club like the Bluebell was simply swamped. Indeed, the last record of the club playing is in a match against the Good Templars Harmonic in February 1880 for which it needed to borrow players from the unknown Possil Park United.

It entered the Scottish Cup for the next two seasons, but scratched from its first tie in 1880–81, even a first round bye not persuading the side to play its second round tie. In 1881–82, the club was drawn to play Alexandra Athletic, but had dissolved before the tie could take place. The name was revived in 1886 for a side playing out of Overnewton.

== Colours ==
The club wore dark blue jerseys and knickers, and red hose with a white stripe.

== Ground ==
The club played at Hamilton Hill Park, a 15-minute walk from Cowlairs railway station.

== Notable players ==
Two Blue Bell players went on to win the Scottish Cup - George McArthur with Dumbarton in 1883, and Tom Robertson (who made his Blue Bell debut in the replay against the 3rd L.R.V.), with Queen's Park in 1890 and 1893, and St Bernards in 1895.
