= Carlton F.C. (Greenock) =

Former association football club in Scotland

Carlton
- Full name: Carlton F.C.
- Nickname(s): Ladyburn Parkites
- Founded: 1887
- Dissolved: 1891
- Ground: Ladyburn
- Match Secretary: A. M. Sutherland
Home colours

Carlton Football Club was a Scottish football team located in the town of Greenock, Renfrewshire.

== History ==
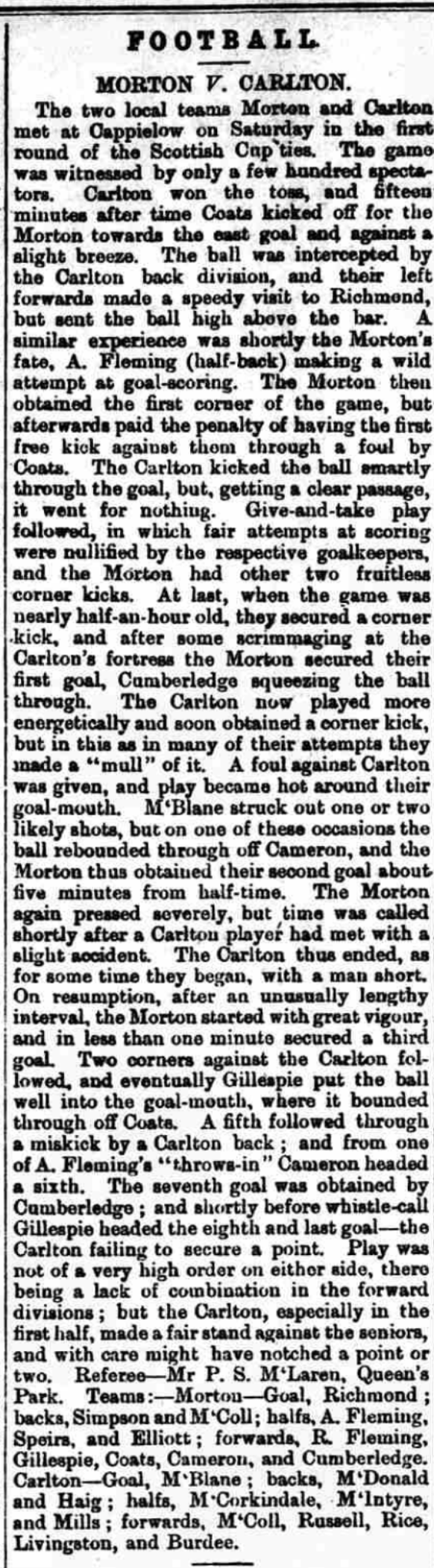
1889–90 Scottish Cup 1st Round, Morton 8–0 Carlton, Greenock Telegraph, 9 September 1889

The club was founded in September 1887, at a time when most of the Greenock senior clubs, apart from Morton, had disbanded, and the junior scene was heading towards a "comatose state". The club's first match was a 10–2 defeat to the 2nd Renfrewshire Rifle Volunteers.

=== Turning senior ===
Carlton turned senior in August 1888, although there was some confusion with the Scottish FA originally thinking that the applicant club was a team from Edinburgh.

There was also some confusion within the club itself. Drawn to visit Pollokshaws in the first round of the 1888–89 Scottish Cup, the club contrived to leave Greenock without goalkeeper Campbell, half-back Watson, or right-wing Malcolm.The club found two substitutes but had to play the match with 10 men. The result was a 14–0 thrashing.

The club's unconvincing start continued with a withdrawal from the Renfrewshire Cup in the same season, but it did get an invitation to play in the Greenock & District Charity Cup, much to the chagrin of the Greenock Abstainers, who considered the berth should have been theirs. This caused tension between the two sides, such that they refused to play each other, until burying the hatchet at the start of the 1889–90 season; Carlton proved a point by winning the fixture at Ingleston 6–2. Although the club lost in the first round of the Charity Cup, the defeat was to a very strong Dumbarton side, and Carlton "gave their senior opponents more trouble than they bargained for".

=== Gradual improvements ===
The 1889–90 season was a little better. Carlton suffered another heavy defeat in the national cup, 8–0 at Morton in front of only "a few hundred" spectators, but there were extenuating circumstances, as the club started and finished with 10 men, losing a player at 2–0 down to injury. It had similar bad luck with injury in the Renfrewshire, when, at 1–0 down to Dykebar, the Carlton goalkeeper broke his wrist, and, down to 10 men, Carlton conceded another three. At least the club was considered to have put in a "highly creditable appearance", and was by now considered to be pushing to be the second team in Greenock, vying with the more experienced 1st Renfrew Rifle Volunteers.

The club's momentum included playing the reserve sides of some of the bigger clubs, Carlton conceding two "soft" goals late on to lose 3–2 to Celtic's second XI towards the end of the season, and it enjoyed a 5–1 victory over the much bigger Arthurlie in the first round of the Charity Cup, although Carlton lost 10–0 at Morton in the semi-final, watched by a crowd of 1,500.

=== Sudden collapse ===
At the end of the season, the club lost a number of its players to other clubs, including M'Coll and M'Corquodale to Morton, and it was in such a moribund state that secretary/president Mr Sutherland wrote to the club's opponent in the first round of the 1890–91 Scottish Cup, Lugar Boswell, to scratch. However, the Carlton letter to Lugar Boswell had crossed with a Lugar Boswell letter to the Scottish FA notifying it that Lugar Boswell was unable to get up a team, and therefore was ceding the tie to Carlton. Sutherland therefore got Carlton put into the hat for the second round, but, despite Carlton being drawn in a winnable tie against Glengowan in the second, he could not find an XI.

The club had also already entered the Renfrewshire Cup for 1890–91, being drawn at home to Howwood in the first round, and Sutherland was able to borrow Cappielow Park for the occasion, as well as recruit a number of old Morton men for the line-up. The match started late and was brought to a halt after 85 minutes, with Carlton eight goals to the good. Despite the one-sidedness making the game "very laughable at times" and "fun for the money", the Renfrewshire Association made the "somewhat ridiculous" decision to order a replay, which should have been a sinecure for Carlton, but, due to a misunderstanding, not enough players had turned up, so the club scratched from the tie - and within 10 minutes of the scratching the full complement appeared. To add to the air of unreality, Howwood scratched before facing an inevitable humiliation at the hands of Port Glasgow Athletic.

Without a ground, and without any competitive football available, there is no record of Carlton having played again. The club technically existed for the 1890–91 season as Sutherland was president of the Renfrewshire FA, via his role at Carlton, until the season's end.

== Colours ==
The club wore blue and white.

== Ground ==
The club gained permission, on foundation, to use Wellington Park for its first season; the ground had been used by other senior clubs before, including the eponymous club. Before the 1888–89 season, the club took over Ladyburn Park from the moribund Greenock Rangers, the ground being (re-)opened with a 2–1 defeat to Dumbarton Union on 18 August 1888. Carlton tried to secure the Berry Yards for 1889–90, but was unable to do so, so reverted to Ladyburn.

The club's apparent end before the start of the 1890–91 season meant that the club ceded Ladyburn to the Abstainers, so Carlton had to borrow Cappielow for its Renfrewshire tie.

== Notable players ==
- William M'Coll, later a Scottish international, who left for Morton in 1890
