= Kelvinbank F.C. =

Association football club in Glasgow City, Scotland

Kelvinbank
- Full name: Kelvinbank Football Club
- Founded: 1876
- Dissolved: 1880
- Ground: Westbourne Park
- Secretary: Dugald Maccall, William J. Cumming, George R. Connell
Home colours

Kelvinbank Football Club was a 19th-century football club originally based in Govan, but which spent the majority of its existence in Partick, in Glasgow.

== History ==
The club was founded in 1876. The earliest recorded match for the club was a 1–0 defeat at the Renfrew Ramblers in December 1876.

The club was one of 36 admitted to the Scottish Football Association at the start of the 1877–78 season, which meant the club could enter the 1877–78 Scottish Cup. In the first round, Kelvinbank beat Petershill 3–2 at the latter's Avenue Park in a "very fast game". In the second, despite the "good service" of M'Call in goal, Kelvinbank went down 2–1 at Parkgrove.

The club entered the Cup for the next four seasons. In the first three it lost in the first round; in the fourth it scratched. Kelvinbank was particularly unlucky with the draw, never being drawn at home in an era in which home advantage was vital. Further, in 1878–79, it was given an impossible task by being drawn at Queen's Park, the giants of the game at the time, who breezed past 8–0, Jerry Weir scoring a hat-trick. The strength of the home side was shown by the Cup tie following a curtain-raiser between Stoke and the Queen's Park reserve XI, which the reserves won 4–1.

By 1881 the club was restricted to 40 members, fewer than Partick and Partick Thistle. With a declining membership and a large number of new clubs starting up, Kelvinbank did not pay its subscription for the 1882–83 season, and was removed from the Scottish FA membership roll.

== Colours ==
The club played in scarlet and blue 2" hooped shirts, white knickers, and blue hose.

== Grounds ==
The club played at the following grounds:

- 1876–78: Summerton Park in Govan, also described as Fairfield
- 1878–79: Dowanhill Park in Partick, five minutes from the Glasgow Gasworks tram station
- 1879–81: Westbourne Park, Hyndland Road, 5 minutes' walk from the Glasgow Botanic Gardens tram terminus
