= Newmains F.C. =

Newmains
- Full name: Newmains Football Club
- Nickname(s): the Down-the-way Club
- Founded: 1876
- Dissolved: 1885
- Ground: Brown Street
- Hon. secretary: Robert K. Hinshalwood
- Match secretary: Thomas Russell
to 1881 colours	from 1881 colours

Newmains Football Club was a 19th-century football club based in Newmains, Lanarkshire, Scotland.

== History ==
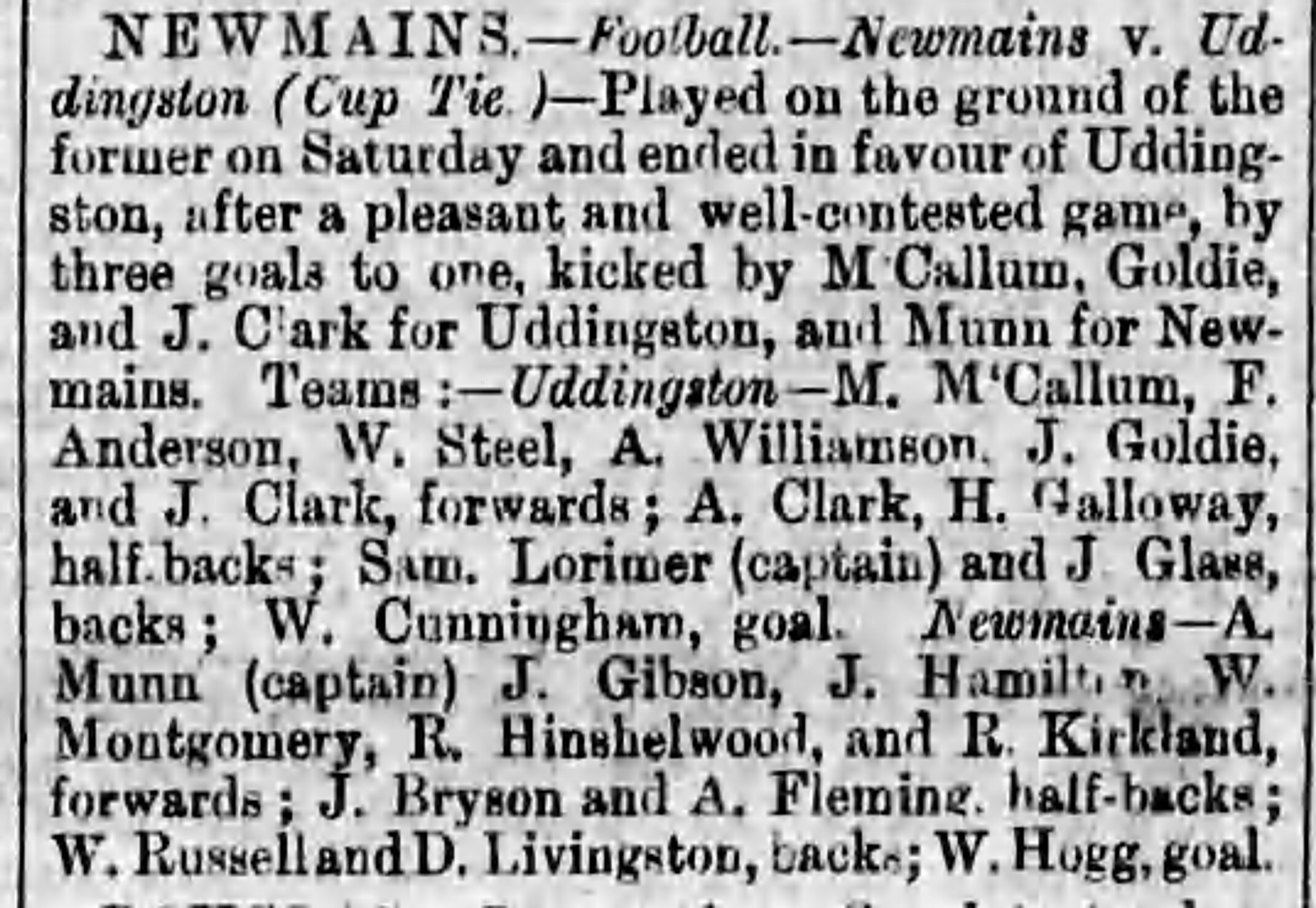
Newmains 1–3 Uddingston, 1877–78 Scottish Cup 1st Round, Hamilton Advertiser, 29 September 1877

The club was formed in 1876, as a winter activity for the Newmains cricket club, its football captain being the cricket captain Archibald Munn. It was linked to the Coltness iron works and gave the works as its correspondence address.

The club's first match at the end of the 1876–77 season, against Shotts, who sent a team "for the purpose of inaugurating the association game in that district". The ensuing defeat did not discourage Newmains; the teams had a convivial entertainment after the match and Newmains joined the Scottish Football Association three months later.

The club's first competitive match was in the first round of the 1877–78 Scottish Cup, losing at home to Uddingston. The club entered the Scottish Cup twice more, but did not win a fixture. In the first round of the 1878–79 Scottish Cup, the club was decimated at home by Upper Clydesdale, the final score being 12–0 and three of the Upper Clydesdale scoring hat-tricks. In the 1879–80 Scottish Cup, the club passed into the second round after first round opponents Avondale dissolved before the tie; in the second the club lost 2–0 at Plains Blue Bell.

Newmains continued playing football over the next few years, mostly at a low-key level, but the club did beat Edina of Edinburgh away from home in a friendly in 1882–83, and entered the Lanarkshire Cup for the only time in 1883–84. The 7–1 defeat at Hamilton Academical seems to have put the club off undertaking any more serious football activity, and in 1883 it lost two key players to emigration; the club does not have any matches recorded after 1885.

== Colours ==
The club originally wore blue and white hoops. In 1881, the club changed to orange and black.

== Grounds ==
The club originally played on the cricket pitch near Brown Street, using the local school's club house for facilities. In 1879, it moved to Crindledyke Park, a quarter of a mile from Newmains railway station.
