= Windsor F.C. (Glasgow) =

Association football club in Glasgow City, Scotland

Windsor
- Full name: Windsor F.C.
- Founded: 1876
- Dissolved: 1881
- Ground: Dalmarnock Park
- Hon. Secretary: Charles M'Fie
- Match Secretary: John Brown
Home colours

Windsor Football Club was an association football club from Bridgeton, Glasgow, active in the 1870s and 1880s.

== History ==
The club, claimed a foundation date of 1877, but there are records of fixtures from 1876. The club's first competitive football came in the West of Scotland Cup for non-senior clubs, reaching the third round in 1877–78, but losing to reigning champions Marchtown in the first round at Pollokshields in 1878–79.

The club had a successful 1879–80 season at junior level, although one of its two defeats was in the Royal Standard Cup (for clubs in and around the Gorbals area).

Despite this competitive setback, Windsor turned senior at the end of the season and entered the 1880–81 Scottish Cup. The club's first match as a senior club that season was a "fast and exciting" 4–2 win at Tollcross, but, in the first round of the Cup, Windsor lost 1–0 at Jordanhill; there was some consolation two months later when the club beat Rosehill of Paisley 10–0.

The club did enter the 1881–82 Scottish Cup, and was drawn to play Whitefield, but dissolved before the tie could take place.

== Colours ==
The club wore white jerseys and knickers, and red and black hose.

== Ground ==
The club originally played on the Glasgow Green. In order to join the Scottish Football Association, the club needed a private ground, and found one at Dalmarnock Park, 3 minutes' walk from the London Road car terminus, either on or very close to the site used by the Thistle.
