= 19th Lanarkshire Rifle Volunteers F.C. =

Association football club in Glasgow City, Scotland

19th L.R.V.
- Full name: 19th Lanarkshire Rifle Volunteers F.C.
- Nickname(s): the Warriors
- Founded: 1877
- Dissolved: 1881
- Ground: Onslow Park
- Hon. secretary: Robert Nisbet
- Match secretary: John J. Alexander
Home colours

The 19th Lanarkshire Rifle Volunteers Football Club was a 19th-century association football club based in Glasgow.

== History ==
The club was formed out of the 19th Lanark R.V.C., incorporated in 1859, as a company in the Volunteer movement of the British Army. The Volunteers included sporting activities within their purview and newspapers often carried reports of such activities. The growth of football in Scotland, especially thanks to Queen's Park, and the success of army teams in England such as the Royal Engineers A.F.C., encouraged regiments to form football clubs as part of the physical regimen.

The football side was founded in 1877, and was comparatively late to the game for a Glaswegian Volunteer side, with the 1st and 3rd Lanarkshire, and the 4th Renfrewshire already having joined the Scottish Football Association before the 19th did so.

The club's first season saw it only play two matches; nevertheless it entered the Scottish Cup in 1878–79. The club was drawn at Possil Bluebell and lost 8–0.

The club entered the competition again in 1879–80, and was given a walkover in the first round as scheduled opponents Wellpark had dissolved before the match. In the second round the club was humiliated 14–1 at Queen's Park; even the Warriors' goal - a consolation when already 8–0 down - drew laughter as it was scored when a bored Graham in the Queen's Park goal had temporarily absented himself, and Volunteer forward McCracken was able to run the ball through.

It was obvious that the game was already developed beyond the capabilities of the side, especially as even in its second season it only played 10 times, and although it was drawn to play City in the 1880–81 Scottish Cup, it scratched from the competition.

== Colours ==
The club wore scarlet jerseys, serge blue knickers, and blue and white hose, similar to the regimental colours of scarlet tunics and blue trousers.

== Grounds ==
The club played at Onslow Park, the ground of Dennistoun, and also shared with Good Templars Harmonic.
