= Mount Vernon F.C. =

Former association football club in Glasgow City, Scotland

Mount Vernon
- Full name: Mount Vernon Football Club
- Founded: 1876
- Dissolved: 1879
- Ground: Carmyle Park
- Secretary: William Kyle, William Bowie
Home colours

Mount Vernon Football Club was a 19th-century football club based in Mount Vernon, Glasgow, Scotland.

== History ==
The club was founded in 1874, with the club's first recorded match being a 0–0 draw against the Sandyford second XI, although the Sandyford side was more of an X as it was a player short.

The club had 30 members by 1877, when it joined the Scottish Football Association, after only 2 defeats in 16 matches in the 1876–77 season. The club also only lost 2 matches in its first senior season, but one of those was in the first round of the Scottish Cup, a 2–1 defeat at home to Glengowan. One notable win for Mount Vernon was a 1–0 victory over Shotts despite playing the game with only 9 men.

Mount Vernon met Glengowan again in the first round of the 1878–79 Scottish Cup, Glengowan again winning by the odd goal, this time 4–3.

Mount Vernon did enter the Cup in 1879–80, and was drawn at home to Upper Clydesdale, but had dissolved before the tie could take place.

== Colours ==
The club played in navy blue.

== Ground ==
The club's ground was Carmyle Park, a five-minute walk from Mount Vernon railway station.
