= Vale of Avon F.C. =

Vale of Avon
- Nickname(s): the Vale
- Founded: 1880
- Dissolved: 1886
- Ground: Grierson's Holm
- President: George Stewart
- Match Secretary: James Campbell
- Captain: James Grainger
1883–84 colours	1884–85 colours

Vale of Avon Football Club was an association football club from Strathaven, Lanarkshire.

== History ==
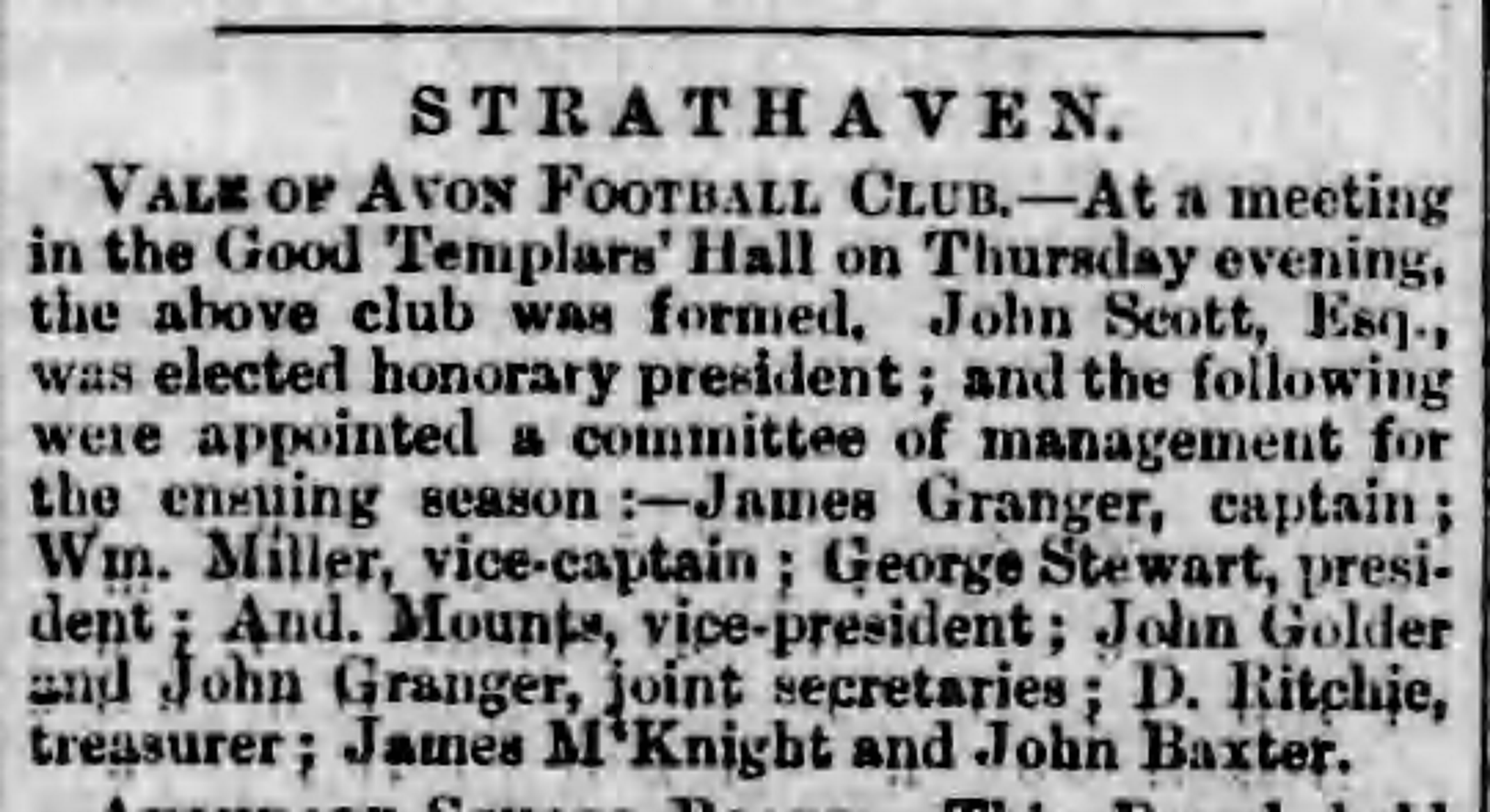
Formation of the Vale of Avon Football Club, Hamilton Advertiser, 3 April 1880

The club was formed on 1 April 1880, at a meeting at the Good Templars' Hall. It was effectively a replacement for the defunct Avondale and eventually rented a ground from the former honorary secretary of Avondale (James Grierson).

The club played at a junior level for its first three seasons, one match with Carluke being ended after 20 minutes because of "the very quarrelsome nature of the Vale team", or, alternatively, because the Carluke team left the field in protest at having a goal disallowed.

It was admitted to the Scottish Football Association in August 1883, in time to enter the 1883–84 Scottish Cup, and drew a bye into the second round, but scratched when paired with Benhar.

The club claimed a successful 1883–84 season with 10 wins, 2 draws, and 1 defeat, the one loss coming in the club's only Lanarkshire Cup entry, 3–1 at Albion Rovers. Despite this ostensible success, the club scratched from the 1884–85 Scottish Cup after being drawn against the much smaller Airdriehill.

The club's somewhat pointless run as a senior team ended in 1885 when it did not renew its Scottish FA membership. It continued once more at a junior level until the 1885–86 season, but before the 1886–87 season could get underway, fell apart amid a welter of recrimination; the club did not convene a meeting to approve the club accounts, and, despite the committee's assertion that the club "is not dead: it merely sleepeth", it never re-started.

== Colours ==
The earliest known colours for the club are navy and white jersey and hose, and white knickers. In 1884 it changed to black and white jersey and hose, with blue knickers.

== Ground ==
After playing on public fields for a season, the club found a more permanent location in August 1881 on a field owned by a Mr Semple in Westfield. In May 1882 the club acquired a lease of Grierson's Holm, half-a-mile from Strathaven railway station.

== See also ==
- Greenock Abstainers F.C., Good Templar football club in Greenock
- Harmonic F.C., Good Templar football club in Dennistoun
