= Shaftesbury F.C. (Scotland) =

Former association football club in Scotland

- Full name: Shaftesbury Football Club
- Founded: 1876
- Dissolved: 1878
- Ground: Ashton Park
- Secretary: E. S. Graham
- Captain: J. Holm
Home colours

Shaftesbury Football Club was a football club based in the burgh of Partick (now part of the city of Glasgow), Scotland.

== History ==
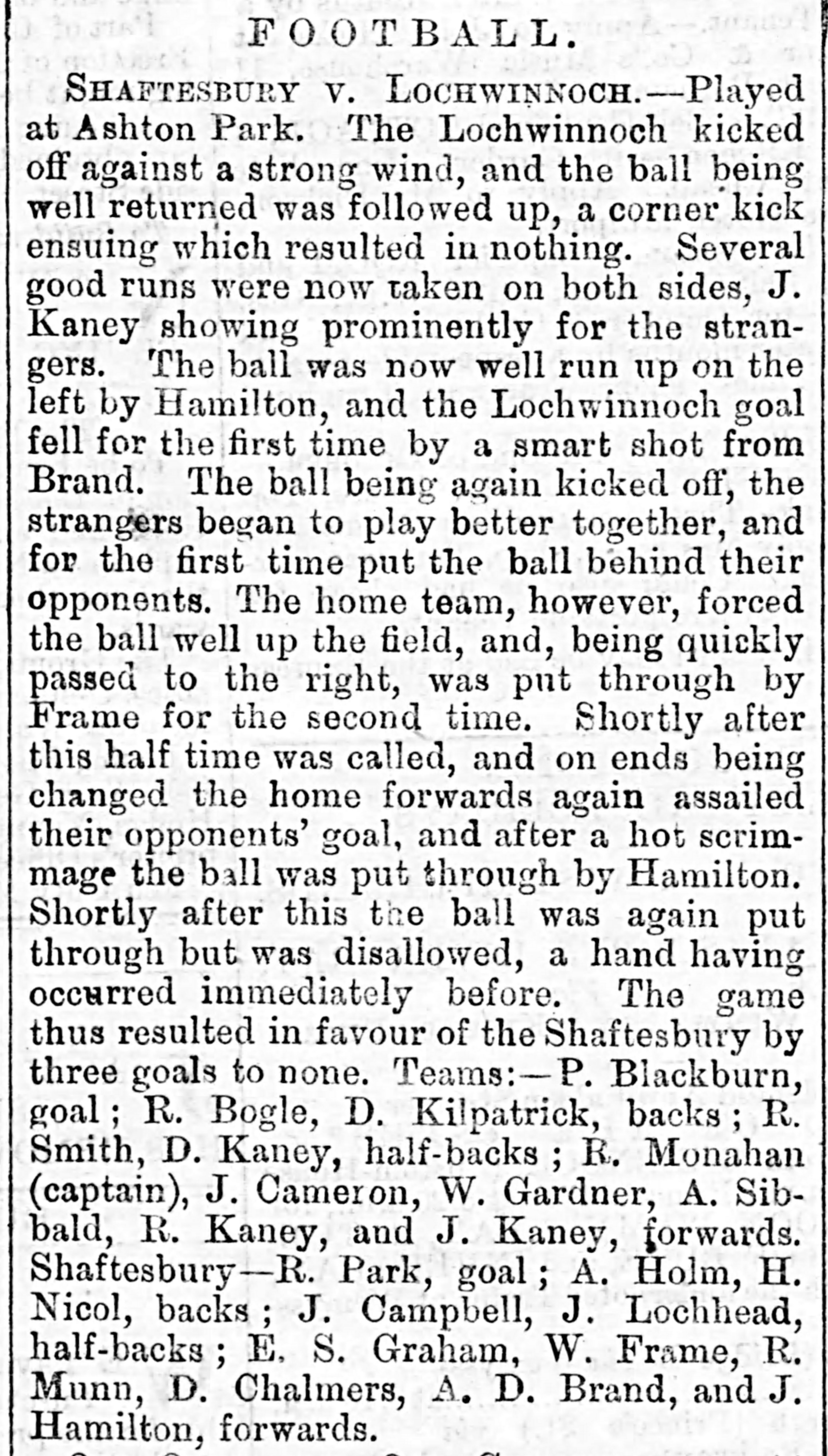
A friendly victory over the original Lochwinnoch club, Paisley Daily Express, 24 September 1877

The club was founded in 1876. It was linked to the Glasgow Royal Infirmary; the club took its name from Lord Shaftesbury, who had laid the foundation for the Infirmary's Lenzie Hospital in 1871, the club played at least one match for the benefit of the Western Infirmary, and its ground was behind the Western Infirmary in Partick. The club's correspondence address was also that of the Royal College of Physicians and Surgeons of Glasgow.

Shaftesbury only played senior football for 2 seasons, despite having a large membership (it operated two XIs throughout most of its existence), joining the Scottish Football Association in 1877. It duly entered the 1877–78 Scottish Cup, losing in the first round at home to Rosslyn 3–1.

The club was more enthusiastic than technical; for one friendly at Clydesdale in 1877, only ten players turned up, and the club's solution to the problem was to play without a goalkeeper. Shaftesbury changed its approach for the second half, by which time the club was 5–0 down, and the game ended 6–2.

The club had been active in 1877–78, winning 10 out of 22 matches, and entered the 1878–79 Scottish Cup. The club was unlucky to be drawn away to Rangers, and lost 3–0, the defeat - following on from a 4–0 reverse at Beith - seeming to dispirit the club to the extent that it did not survive the season. It did try out a match under electric lights against Parkgrove in November 1878 but the experiment was not a success.

== Colours ==
The club played in dark blue jerseys, white knickers, and red stockings.

== Ground ==
The club played at Ashton Park. This became the ground of City after Shaftesbury ceased playing regular football.

== Notable players ==
- Andrew Holm, later a Scottish international
