= Campsie Glen F.C. =

Former association football club in Scotland

Campsie Glen
- Full name: Campsie Glen Football Club
- Founded: 1878
- Dissolved: 1882
- Ground: Lennox Park
- Match Secretary: Thomas Rodger
- Hon. Secretary: James Fergus Jun.
Campsie Glen colours	Campsie Athletic colours

Campsie Glen Football Club was a football team from Lennoxtown, Stirlingshire.

== History ==
The club was formed in 1878. In its first season, the club won 11 of its 16 matches, and only lost 3.

One of those defeats was in the first round of the 1878–79 Scottish Cup, 1–0 (plus one disputed) at Falkirk; the club was one of the 6 sides from Stirlingshire to enter the competition. Its second and last entry under the Campsie Glen name, in 1879–80, was much more successful. In the first round, the club beat Thistle Athletic 4–1; Thistle had walked off the pitch in protest at crowd encroachment early in the second half, with the score at 1–1. Thistle formally protested about the defeat on the basis that the ground was not roped off and at one point a spectator deliberately tripped the Thistle goalkeeper, and the Scottish Football Association ordered that the tie be re-played on neutral ground, which turned out to be at Alexandra Athletic in Glasgow. The protest proved to be futile as the Glen won 4–0 this time.

The club had another 4–0 win in the second round, at Milton of Campsie, and again faced a protest, this time on the basis that the referee had given a decision before anyone had appealed for it, in breach of the then Law XIII. Not only did the Association dismiss the protest, it reprimanded Milton of Campsie for "the language used in the protest against the referee".

The third round tie, at home to Strathblane, was a de facto Stirlingshire final, as 8 clubs from the county had entered, and the winners were hailed as the champion club of the shire. The clubs had played a bruising game in March 1879, with Michael Devlin of the Glen being sent to hospital with a broken collarbone, but the Glen managing to win 3–0 (with one other goal disputed). However Strathblane gained revenge in the Cup, beating the Glen 2–1.

== Campsie Athletic ==
There is no record of Campsie Glen after the 1879–80 season, and the club appears to have re-formed as Campsie Athletic, with the same ground and same match secretary as Glen. Athletic entered the Scottish Cup in 1880–81 and 1881–82, but did not play a match; it scratched from its first scheduled tie and was dissolved before its second.

== Colours ==
The club played in black jerseys, white knickers, and black and white hose. As Athletic the club registered its colours as red and white jerseys, white knickers, and red hose, although there is no record of the club ever having played.

== Ground ==
The club played at Lennox Park, a 10-minute walk from Lennoxtown station.
