= Barrhead Rangers F.C. =

Association football club in Scotland

Barrhead Rangers
- Full name: Barrhead Rangers F.C.
- Founded: 1875
- Dissolved: 1880
- Ground: Springfield Park
- Match Secretary: Alex Lindsay
- Captain: J. M'Aulay

Barrhead Rangers Football Club was a Scottish football club from Barrhead, East Renfrewshire.

== History ==
The club's first recorded match was a 2–0 defeat in a friendly at Glasgow Rangers in February 1875. The Rangers' first competitive football was in the first Renfrewshire Cup in 1877–78, reaching the second round. The same season the club entered the West of Scotland Cup set up by clubs refused membership to the Scottish Football Association for not having their own private grounds. The Rangers won through three rounds to the quarter-final, but lost 4–1 at home to eventual winners Marchtown, M'Lay scoring the Rangers goal.

The club joined the SFA in September 1879, seemingly too late to be entered into the 1879–80 Scottish Cup, as the first round had already taken place; however the club, along with some other later entrants, was put into the second round. Ironically its crosstown rivals Barrhead had already been eliminated, and Rangers took advantage, beating Renfrew Ramblers in the second round, and the Rangers were only narrowly beaten at the eventual finalists Thornliebank in the third, the Model Villagers scoring the only goal of the game on a breakaway with five minutes to go.

In the Renfrewshire Cup that season, the Rangers beat Abercorn 5–1, before facing another Barrhead side, Arthurlie. The tie, before 500 spectators at Springfield, ended 1–1; it is however not clear if a replay was ever held, as there is no further reference to the Barrhead Rangers club. The club appears to have merged into Arthurlie, as its key players - M'Nab, new captain M'Cowat, and Melville, who had all played for the Renfrewshire representative side while registered with Rangers - are all recorded as playing for Arthurlie the following season.

The name was revived in 1887 for a Junior club.

== Colours ==
There is no available record of the club's colours; it joined the Scottish FA too late for inclusion in the yearbook, and was absorbed into Arthurlie before it could make a second entry.

== Ground ==
The club's home ground was Springfield Park.
