= Thomas Robertson (footballer, born 1864) =

Scottish footballer

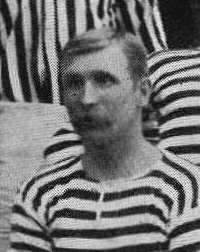
Robertson in 1890

Thomas Robertson (28 December 1864 – January 1924) was a Scottish footballer, who played for Cowlairs, Aston Villa, Queen's Park, St Bernard's and Scotland.

== Career ==
Robertson was the son of a dairyman who had a lease over a field close to Possil Park. He made his debut as a 16 year old in a Scottish Cup replay for Possil Bluebell against the Third Lanark Rifle Volunteers in 1880, replacing half-back Harry Davies, who was unavailable. As an apprentice engineer at the Hyde Park Locomotive Works, he moved to Northern, which had links with the works, after Blue Bell broke up; by 1888 he was playing with Northern's rival Cowlairs, and by 1890 he was with Queen's Park. He was a winner of the Scottish Cup with both Queen's Park (1890, 1893) and St Bernard's (1895).

After retiring as a player, Robertson was a football referee and became president of the Scottish Football League.

== See also ==
- List of Scotland national football team captains
