= St Andrew's F.C. (Edinburgh) =

Association football club in Scotland

St Andrew's
- Full name: St Andrew'sFootball Club
- Founded: 1874
- Dissolved: 1876
- Ground: East Meadows
- Secretary: Wm. Henderson
- Captain: Bob Winton
Home colours

St Andrew's Football Club was a short-lived Scottish football club from the city of Edinburgh, which was instrumental in the continuance of Heart of Midlothian.

== History ==
The club was formed in 1874, based on the St Andrew's boys' club, whose members often played football on the Meadows. The first recorded matches for the club are from the 1875–76 season.

St Andrew's entered the Scottish Cup for the only time in 1876–77. Heart of Midlothian had also entered the Cup, but, having in effect disbanded, withdrew; a number of its players therefore joined St Andrew's in time to play in the competition.

In the first round, the club beat Grasshoppers from Bonnybridge thanks to a second-half goal from Tom Purdie, who had been the Hearts' first captain.

Two weeks after the Cup tie, the club played in the Edinburgh Cup for the only time, and lost 1–0 to the Swifts, in a match in which St Andrew's did not test Simpson in the Swifts goal once. One week after losing in the Edinburgh Cup, the club played in second round of the Scottish Cup, against St Clement's of Dundee, the match taking place on neutral ground at Kirkcaldy. St Andrew's took the lead following an own goal in a "melée", and St Clement's claimed an equalizer from Sharp, to which St Andrew's objected; St Clement's scored again soon afterwards, to win the tie 2–1, the St Andrew's protest being dismissed.

The last game played under the St Andrew's name was a 0–0 draw with Hanover on 4 November 1876.

At a club meeting towards the end of the year, the former Hearts players proposed that St Andrew's should change its name to Heart of Midlothian, to avoid confusion with the city of St Andrews, and on the basis that the Hearts name carried some value and distinction. The members agreed and Heart of Midlothian in essence took over the St Andrew's club, the next match the members played, in January 1877 (the return match with the Hanover), being under the Heart of Midlothian name.

== Colours ==
The club played originally in navy blue and by 1876 had changed to white and blue.

== Ground ==
In common with other early clubs in the city, the club played at the East Meadows.

== Notable players ==
In its two Scottish Cup ties, the sides included the following Hearts players:

- Tom Purdie
- John Cochrane
- George Mitchell
- Bob Winton
- John Alexander
- John Sweeney
- Andrew Lees
- George Barbour
