= Greenock Abstainers F.C. =

Former association football club in Scotland

Greenock Abstainers
- Full name: Greenock Abstainers F.C.
- Nickname(s): the Abstainers
- Founded: 1887
- Dissolved: 1892
- Ground: Upper Ingleston Park
- Secretary: Robert Dixon
Home colours

Greenock Abstainers Football Club was a Scottish football team located in the town of Greenock, Renfrewshire.

== History ==
The first reference to the club is from 1887, under the name John Dunlop Templars, as an athletic division of the Greenock branch of the International Organisation of Good Templars. The club was named for John Dunlop, known as the father of the temperance movement in Scotland. The Templars entered the Renfrewshire Cup for the first time in 1888–89, and made its competition bow in the third round with a walkover when Roseberry scratched, and a bye; however the club suffered a 14–1 drubbing at Abercorn, the Templars goal coming from a long shot when 3–0 down which Abercorn goalkeeper Goudie misjudged when trying to clear. The result was something of a foregone conclusion as the Abercorn 3rd XI was good enough to draw with the Templar 1st XI.

Perhaps prompted by such a heavy defeat, on 4 February 1889, the club changed its name to Greenock Abstainers, in the hope of attracting players of a temperance mindset who were not part of the Templar movement. That August the club ambitiously became a member of the Scottish Football Association and entered the 1889–90 Scottish Cup. The club was lucky to be drawn against the moribund Renfrew in the first round; Renfrew was unable to raise an XI, and ceded the tie. In the second round, the Abstainers lost 8–0 at Port Glasgow Athletic before a crowd of 500. The same season, the club played in the Renfrewshire Cup for the only time under the Abstainers name, and lost 6–1 to Kilbarchan.

The club's first recorded senior victory was a 1–0 home win over Bridge of Weir in December 1889. The club also raised funds at the end of the season by hosting a match between a Paisley select (made up of St Mirren and Dykebar players) and a Greenock select (made up of Morton and Port Glasgow Athletic players), which was "financially a big success".

At the end of the season, the Abstainers' James Campbell, attending the Scottish Football Association AGM, proposed against a Renton motion that there be a qualifying section for the 1890–91 Scottish Cup. Mr Campbell carried the room on that occasion, allowing the Abstainers to enter the competition at the first round proper, but the club's narrow constituency in an era of growing professionalism doomed it to obsolescence. In its first round tie the club suffered a 13–0 defeat against Newmilns; the club had been drawn at home but ceded home advantage. It had entered the Renfrewshire but withdrew when drawn to face the Neilston club.

The Scottish FA brought in a qualifying process for the 1891–92 Scottish Cup, and the Abstainers were drawn to face Johnstone in the first qualifying round. The consequent 20–1 defeat seems to have persuaded the Abstainers to throw in the towel; it scratched to Arthurlie in the county competition and there are no further matches recorded for the club. It was formally struck from the club register in August 1892.

== Colours ==
The club played in dark blue.

== Ground ==
The club originally played at Docherty's Park. By 1888 the club had moved to Ingleston Park and in 1890 it took over Ladyburn from the moribund Carlton.

== See also ==
- Harmonic F.C., Good Templar football club in Dennistoun
- Vale of Avon F.C., Good Templar football club in Strathaven
- United Abstainers F.C., Scottish Temperance League club in Crosshill, Glasgow
