= Shawlands Athletic F.C. =

Association football club in Glasgow City, Scotland

Shawlands Athletic
- Full name: Shawlands Athletic Football Club
- Nickname(s): the Athletic
- Founded: 1880
- Dissolved: 1881
- Ground: Blythswood Park
- Hon. Secretary: Wm. M'Kittrick Jr
Home colours

Shawlands Athletic Football Club was a Scottish football team, based in Pollokshaws, now part of Glasgow (at the time a separate burgh).

== History ==
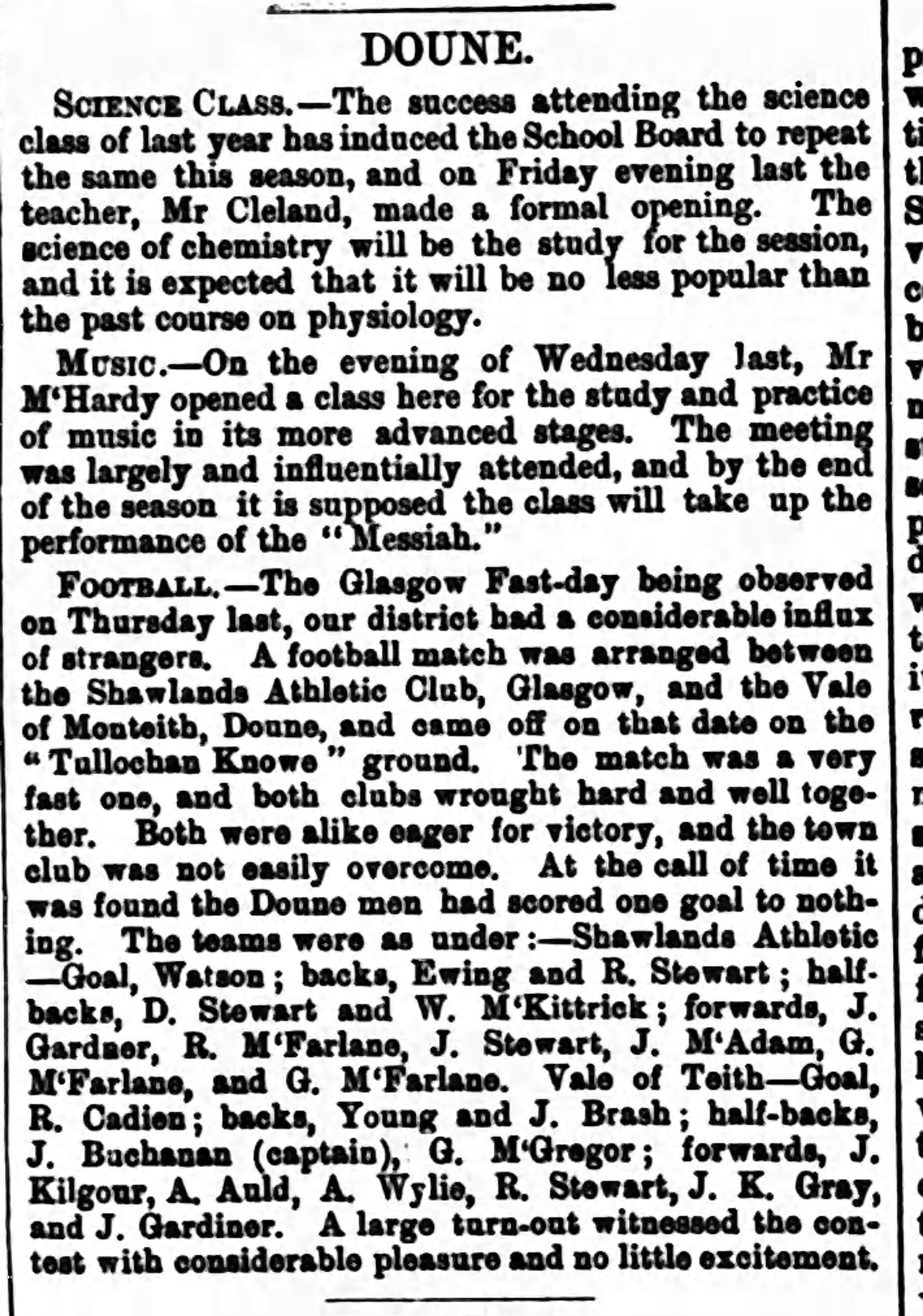
Vale of Teith 1–0 Shawlands Athletic, Stirling Saturday Observer, 28 October 1880

The club was founded in March 1880 and joined the Scottish Football Association five months later. It only played one season in senior football, 1880–81, but, thanks to the luck of the draw, went some way into the two major competitions it was entitled to enter - the Scottish Cup and Renfrewshire Cup.

In the former, the club gained walkovers against both Clydesdale and Possil Bluebell to reach the third round, where the club was drawn to visit Clyde. As the Thursday before the third round tie was Glasgow fast-day, the club visited the Vale of Teith club in Doune for a warm-up match, losing 1–0. Two days later the Athletic lost 4–0 at Clyde in a "very pleasant" game, Sloan scoring a hat-trick.

In the county competition, the club benefitted from an error from the Renfrewshire Association, which did not notify the Athletic before the first round draw was due to be made. The same error applied to Wellington Park of Greenock, so both sides were allowed into the competition at the fourth round stage, to play each other. Shawlands won 4–1 away, to be put into a fifth round tie with Pollok. The clubs drew 2–2, and, as the only other clubs left in the competition after the fifth round of fixtures was played were Arthurlie and St Mirren, both Shawlands and Pollok were moved into the semi-final, to play one the other clubs each. The Athletic was drawn to play St Mirren and lost 2–0 at the Saints' Thistle Park, in front of 2,000 spectators, the Saints scoring both in the first and last knockings of the game.

Despite this promising start to the club's existence, and an entry to the 1881–82 Scottish Cup, the club had dissolved before it could play its first round tie.

== Colours ==
The club played in 1" black and ½" white hooped jerseys, white knickers, and black and white hose.

== Ground ==
The club played at Blythswood Park.

== Notable players ==
- William Anderson, the "Demon Dodger", who left the club for Queen's Park.
