= Wellpark F.C. =

Association football club in Glasgow City, Scotland

Wellpark
- Full name: Wellpark F.C.
- Founded: 1875
- Dissolved: 1879
- Ground: Dalmarnock Park
- Hon. Secretary: Samuel Leckie
Home colours

Wellpark Football Club was an association football club from east Glasgow, active in the 1870s.

== History ==
The club was formed in 1875, out of a cricket club. The football club was playing matches against other clubs at least by 1876.

In 1877, the combined membership of the cricket and football sections donated 11/6 to a relief fund in aid of locked-out Clyde dockyard workers.

In August 1877, the Scottish Football Association refused membership to a number of clubs without their own private grounds, and several clubs set up the West of Scotland Football Association to cater for those clubs. The new association set up the West of Scotland Cup which Wellpark, playing on the public Glasgow Green, duly entered. The West of Scotland Cup attracted 47 entrants and Wellpark reached the third round, where it drew with Springfield; however Wellpark withdrew before the replay and Springfield went on to the final.

It also played in the second (and last) West of Scotland Cup in 1878–79, losing to Partick Thistle in a semi-final replay. By this time however the club had joined the Scottish Football Association and made its debut in the 1878–79 Scottish Cup. Its first round opponents, Govanhill Lacrosse, scratched. Reality bit in the second round when the club visited the 3rd Lanarkshire Rifle Volunteers, and "from the commencement of the game it became apparent that the Wellpark were overmatched", the one bright spark in an 8–1 defeat being Chalmers' "fine run" resulting in him "sending the leather past the keeper".

Wellpark did enter the 1879–80, but dissolved before its tie with the 19th Lanarkshire Rifle Volunteers.

== Colours ==
The club described its colours as "blue, white, and red", without giving any further details.

== Ground ==
The club originally played on Glasgow Green. On turning senior, it became one of many which played at a ground called Dalmarnock Park; the Wellpark's was off Mordaunt Street, 5 minutes' walk from Bridgeton Cross.
