= West of Scotland Cup =

- Founded: 1877
- Abolished: 1879
- Region: Scotland
- Teams: 51

The West of Scotland Cup was an association football cup competition for clubs in Scotland which were barred from the Scottish Football Association which was played in 1877–78 and 1878–79.

== Format ==
The competition was a knock-out tournament contested by the member clubs of the West of Scotland Football Association.

== History ==
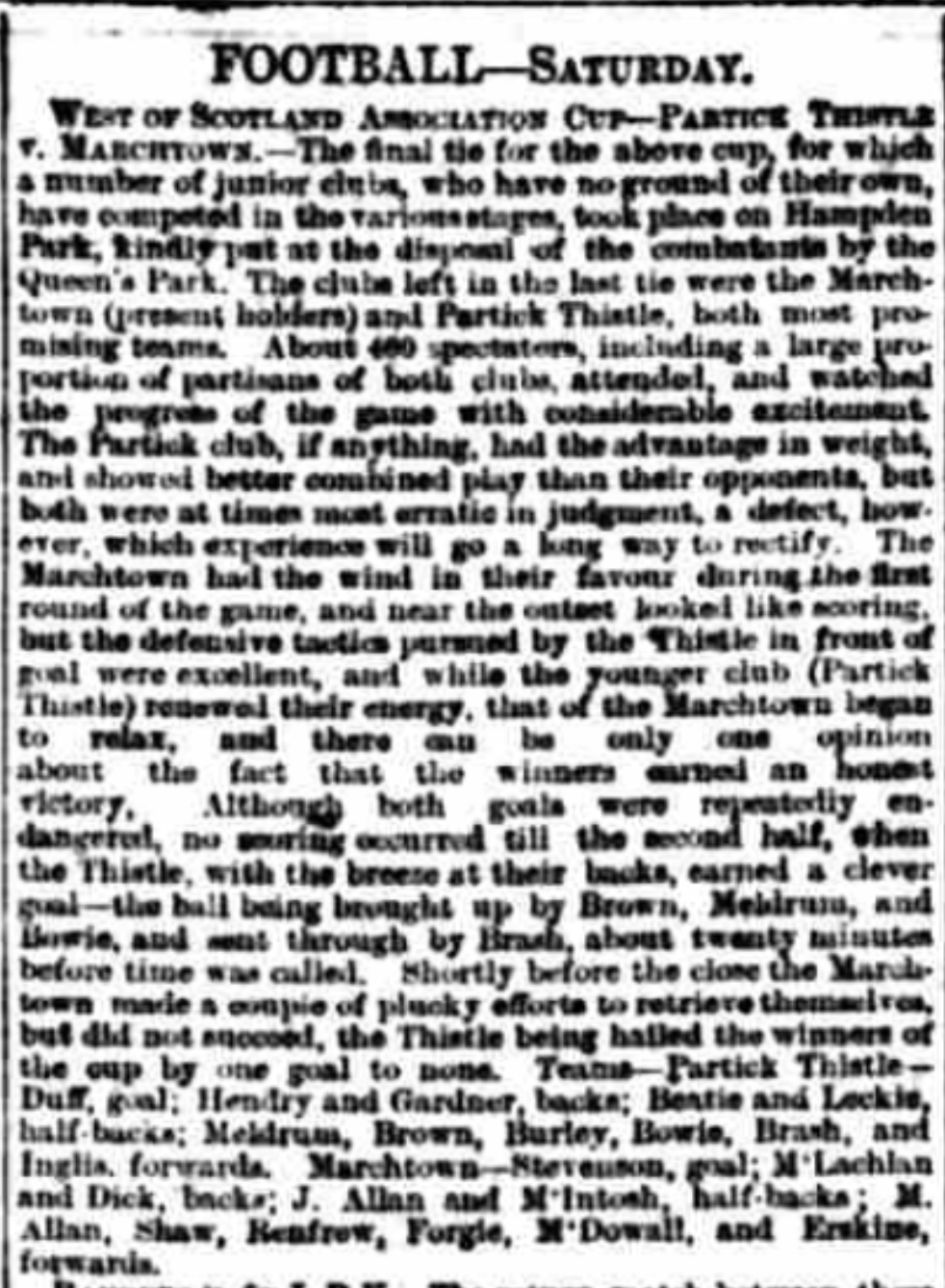
1878–79 West of Scotland Cup final, Partick Thistle 1–0 Marchtown, North British Daily Mail, 7 April 1879

In September 1877, the Scottish FA turned down membership applications from the following clubs:

- Vale of Leven Wanderers
- Thistle
- Dumbarton Wanderers
- Baron of Renfrew
- Renfrew Ramblers
- Springfield
- Stirling King's Arms
- Walworth

The reason given was that these clubs did not have their own private grounds. Previously, clubs which played on public grounds were allowed membership to the Association, but the growth of the game and the need to cover guarantees required a rule change. One senior club, Lancelot, which lacked its own private ground, did not renew its membership as a result.

In late September, therefore, at the instigation of Vale of Leven Wanderers, several club representatives met at White's Temperance Hotel, with the aim of setting up an association. This new entity was called the West of Scotland Football Association for public park sides, and Daniel Browning of Woodlands F.C. took the presidency. The Association raised funds for a cup, the West of Scotland Cup. The competition attracted nearly 50 entrants in its first year, and required five rounds before the final, between two Glasgow clubs, Marchtown and Springburn.

The West of Scotland Association approached Queen's Park for permission to play the final at Hampden Park, but on the casting vote of the chairman, the application was refused:

Mr. W. C. Mitchell proposed that the application be granted, believing that the new association was deserving of encouragement, if for nothing else than that it had relieved the Scottish Association of a number of clubs which had hitherto proved a drag on it. Mr. A. Rae considered that cup competitions had already served their purpose, and the less the club, as a general principle, had to do with them the better.

The final instead was played at Rangers' Kinning Park, and ended in a 1–1 draw, being "characterised by a good style of play" and before a "good turn-out of spectators", the teams taking supper together after the match in Middleton's Restaurant. The replay (at the same venue) was more controversial, Marchtown scoring the only goal of the game after one of the umpires had noted a handball, but as play continued and the handling had no bearing on the goal itself, the goal was allowed, and Marchtown declared champion.

Marchtown also reached the final in the 1878–79 tournament, this time losing 1–0 to Partick Thistle, although Queen's Park condescended this time to host the tie. The association did not survive into a third season, probably because, as more money came into the game, and players looked to have their expenses paid, it became more important for clubs to be able to charge for admission.

== Legacy ==
Although the tournament was only played twice, it was the first national competition for clubs that were not of a senior standard, and something of a forerunner to the Scottish Junior Football Association. Two of the competition's entrants - Partick Thistle and Cowlairs - would go on to play in the Scottish League, and Wellpark, Barrhead Rangers, Windsor, and Govanhill graduated from the tournament to joining the Scottish FA. It also provided a means of competitive football for Dennistoun and Star of Leven who were without grounds temporarily. John McDowall, secretary to (and forward for) Marchtown, became the Scottish FA secretary in 1882.

== Results ==
West of Scotland Cup Finals
Season	Winner	Score	Runners Up	Venue
1877–78	Marchtown	1–1, 1–0	Springburn	Kinning Park
1878–79	Partick Thistle	1–0	Marchtown	Hampden Park
