= Clifton & Strathfillan F.C. =

Former association football club in Scotland

Clifton & Strathfillan
- Full name: Clifton & Strathfillan Football Club
- Nicknames: C and S
- Founded: 1877
- Dissolved: 1879
- Ground: Auchtertyre
- Hon. Secretary: William Harvey
Home colours

Clifton & Strathfillan Football Club was a Scottish association football club from the village of Tyndrum, Perthshire.

== History ==
The club was founded in 1877; it was essentially a merger between two informal clubs of players from the Clifton and Strathfillan areas. On New Year's Day 1877, the two "clubs" played a 16-a-side match at the start of 1877, the Clifton players wearing blue and white caps, and the Strathfillan players wearing red, it being noted that the combined club had received a number of challenges. The following week the two clubs played the Luss club, and on 12 January 1877, the club played a return match, a 12-a-side game for one hour which ended goalless. Straight after that match, the C and S faced Glenorchy in a 20-a-side game; the C and S won 4–0, with a hat-trick from Sinclair.

The combined club was one of the first three clubs in Stirlingshire to join the Scottish Football Association, doing so in September 1877. At the time, with 87 members, it was easily the biggest senior club in the region.

The club competed in the Scottish Cup for the 1877–78, and, as the draw was regionalized at the time, met the other two Stirlingshire senior clubs in the competition. In the first round, the club beat Shaughraun 2–1; there was a dispute as to the amount of time played when the game was brought to a halt, but the score stood. In the second the club lost 3–0 to Grasshoppers of Bonnybridge, held at the Roman Camp in Callander. One of the spectators was a bagpiper, who "played at intervals during the match", and a dance was held on the pitch afterwards.

The club's remoteness meant that finding opponents was a problem, and in the 1877–78 season it only played 9 matches. For the 1878–79 Scottish Cup, the club moved to the new Perthshire section of the draw, and hosted Vale of Teith, the visitors winning 1–0. The two clubs were drawn together in the first round of the 1879–80 Scottish Cup, but the tie did not take place, as Clifton & Strathfillan had dissolved.

== Scottish Cup record ==
=== 1877–78 ===
- First round: Won 2–1 v. Shaughraun, 29 September 1877
- Second round: Lost 0–3 v. Grasshoppers, 20 October 1877

=== 1878–79 ===
- First round: Lost 0–1 v. Vale of Teith, 5 October 1878

== Colours ==
The club wore 1" blue and white hooped jerseys and hose, and white knickers.

== Ground ==
The club played at Auchtertyre, about 15 minutes' walk from Tyndrum station, and had a clubhouse on the ground.
