= Blackfriars F.C. =

Former association football club in Scotland

Blackfriars
- Full name: Blackfriars Football Club
- Founded: 1876
- Dissolved: 1879
- Ground: Belvidere Park
- Secretary: Thomas D. Kirk
Home colours

Blackfriars Football Club was a 19th-century Scottish association football club based in Parkhead, in Glasgow.

== History ==
The club was founded in 1876 and had 25 members in its first season, which made it one of the smallest clubs in the city.

=== Blackfriars Parish Church ===
The club took its name from Blackfriars Parish Church, which was being built in Dennistoun at the time of formation, its parent church on the High Street having just been demolished. It became a member of the Scottish Football Association in September 1877.

Blackfriars entered the Scottish Cup three times. Its first entry, in 1877–78, was the only one with any profit, as the club walked over the now-defunct Hyde Park Loco Works in the first round, and got past the second round by drawing twice with Rovers. Both matches were at Belvidere Park, the first ending 2–2, and the latter 0–0; the Rovers dominated the replay all match, its goalkeeper only touching the ball twice. Under the rules of the competition at the time, both clubs went through to the third round of drawings.

By a strange happenstance, the clubs were then drawn together again, and, in the third tie at Belvidere, the game again ended in a draw, this time 1–1. At the fourth time of asking, and for the first time at Rovers' home, the Rovers won through 2–0; Lindsay (goalkeeper), McGowan, and Colin of the Blackfriars receiving particular praise.

The club's second entry in 1878–79 ended much more quickly, with a 7–0 home defeat to the John Elder works side. The final match recorded for the club was a 4–1 defeat at Caledonia of Thornliebank in March 1879; although the club had entered the 1879–80 Scottish Cup and been drawn at home to Rosslyn, the club had broken up before the tie could take place.

== Colours ==
The club's colours were navy jerseys and white knickerbockers.

== Ground ==
The club played at Belvidere Park, a 10-minute walk from Parkhead railway station.
