= Renton Thistle F.C. =

Defunct association football club in Dunbartonshire, Scotland

Renton Thistle
- Full name: Renton Thistle Football Club
- Founded: 1873
- Dissolved: 1879
- Ground: Renton Public Park
- Secretary: J. Ralston, James Thomson
Home colours

Renton Thistle Football Club was an association football club based in the town of Renton, in Dunbartonshire.

== History ==
The club was founded in 1873, in the wake of other clubs in the West Dunbartonshire area such as Vale of Leven, Renton, and Dumbarton. Its earliest recorded match is a draw with Star of Leven in November 1873.

The club entered the Scottish Cup for the first time in 1875–76, and gained a walkover in the first round after opponents Queen's Park Juniors scratched. In the second round the Thistle lost 2–1 at Dumbarton.

With other clubs in the region having greater backing, the club remained firmly in their shadows, and only ever won one Scottish Cup tie; against Alclutha in the first round in 1877–78. A bye took the club into the third round for the only time in its history, where it lost to Renton 2–0.

The club also progressed to the second round on two other occasions, under the rule that both clubs proceeded after two draws, against Vale of Leven Rovers of Alexandria in 1876–77 and against Alexandria in 1878–79. In the former year the club lost 5–1 at the Lennox club of Dumbarton in the second round; in the latter, the club was hammered 11–0 at Vale of Leven, although a generous Leven secretary praised the "young team" as having "the stuff for making a capital team".

However, the Vale of Leven defeat was the last Cup tie for the club. By 1878 the club only had 28 members and was the smallest senior side in Dumbartonshire. While the revived Renton club was increasing its membership, Thistle remained static. It entered the 1879–80 Scottish Cup tournament and was drawn against Lennox, but was described as "dissolved" before the match took place; this was not quite the case, as Thistle played out a draw with Bonhill in October 1879, but there is nothing further on the club afterwards.

Two further games are recorded for a Renton Thistle at the end of the 1880–81 season, against Dumbarton Albion and Holytown, but this may have been a different entity. The name was revived by Junior club in 1885.

== Colours ==
The club's colours were blue shirts, white knickers, and red hose.

== Ground ==
The club played on the Public Park at the south end of Renton, a three-minute walk from Renton railway station.
