= Port Glasgow F.C. (1876) =

Former association football club in Port Glasgow, Scotland

Port Glasgow
- Full name: Port Glasgow Football Club
- Founded: 1876
- Dissolved: 1879
- Ground: Dougliehill
- Secretary: Alexander Bell, James Crawford
Home colours

Port Glasgow Football Club was a football club based in Port Glasgow, Scotland.

== History ==
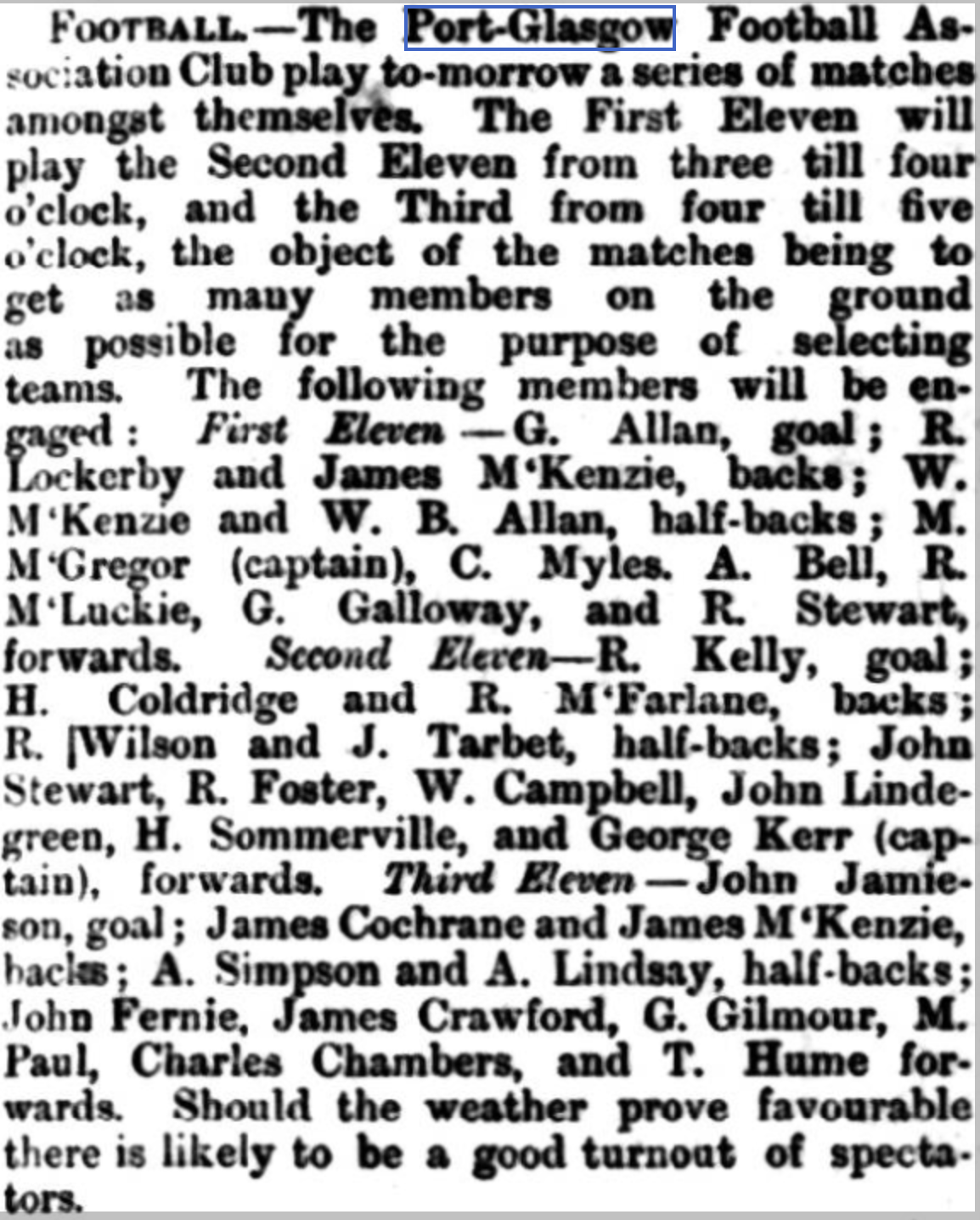
The Port Glasgow F.C. first three XIs, Greenock Telegraph and Clyde Shipping Gazette, 19 October 1877

The club was formed in 1876. It entered the Scottish Cup three times. In the 1877–78 Scottish Cup, the club lost 1–0 at home to Thornliebank in the first round.

The club was lucky with the draw in the first round of the 1878–79 Scottish Cup, as opponents Pollokshaws had disbanded before the season started. The club was not so lucky in the second round, drawn to visit Barrhead at Parkhouse, and Barrhead had an "easy" 6–2 win.

Port Glasgow did enter the Cup in 1879–80 and was drawn to face Johnstone Athletic, but was said to have been dissolved before the tie could take place - the Scottish FA had turned down membership applications from clubs without private grounds from 1877, and as the club had lost its ground before the 1878–79 season, it is likely that, despite a membership figure that was among the largest in Renfrewshire, the lack of gate money made senior football impossible. The club did continue operating until the end of 1879.

== Colours ==
The club played in 2 inch black and white hooped jerseys, white knickers, and black and white hooped stockings.

== Ground ==
The club originally had a private ground at Dougliehill within five minutes' walk from the Caledonian railway station, albeit no club house. By 1878 the club had lost its ground and played on public parks.
