= John Elder F.C. =

Association football club in Glasgow City, Scotland

John Elder
- Full name: John Elder Football Club
- Founded: 1876
- Dissolved: 1886
- Ground: Fairfield Park
- Hon. Secretary: John W. Gibb, Thos. Pringle
- Match Secretary: Robert Love, John W. Gibb
Home colours

John Elder Football Club was a Scottish association football club based in Govan, now part of Glasgow. It was the football side for workers with the John Elder & Co. shipbuilding company.

== History ==
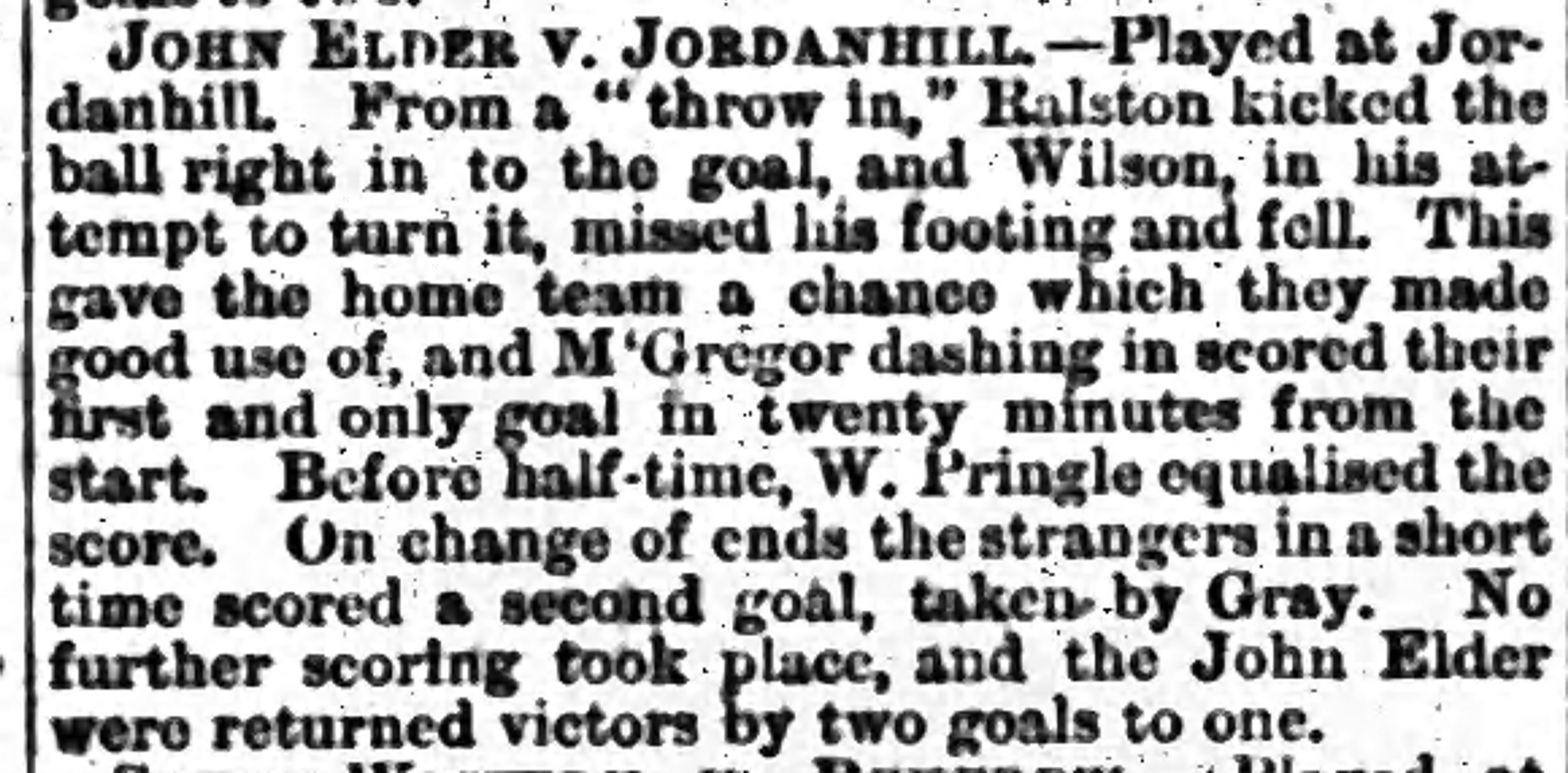
1879–80 Scottish Cup 2nd Round, Jordanhill 1–2 John Elder, North British Daily Mai, 27 October 1879

The club was founded in 1876, and had enough players for two XIs in its first season.

The club joined the Scottish Football Association in time to enter the 1877-78 Scottish Cup. It went through to the second round after two draws with Rovers, which meant that, under the competition rules, both sides progressed, but lost 1–0 at Govan in the second.

John Elder reached the third round of the competition in the next two seasons. In the first round of the 1878–79 Scottish Cup, the club earned its biggest competitive win, 7–0 away at Blackfriars, and beat Stonefield at Dalmarnock Park in the second, the club's secretary Pringle scoring a brace. The club was knocked out 2–1 in the third by Alexandra Athletic after a "thoroughly contested" game.

The following season the club walked over the dissolved Derby club, and seemed to have beaten Jordanhill in the second; however the Association upheld a protest from Jordanhill on the basis that the pitch was not roped off, and spectators interfered with play four or five times, the referee's evidence being that no fewer than 300 spectators were over the touch line. The replay took place at Jordanhill and John Elder came from behind to win 2–1. The tables were turned in the third by South Western, as John Elder took the lead, but only held it for a couple of minutes, and went out 2–1.

As Scottish football became more popular, and new clubs started, John Elder was, like other works sides, left behind. Its 40 members in 1877 made it one of the biggest senior clubs in Glasgow; by 1881, the same number of members made it one of the smallest. The club did enter the 1881–82 Scottish Cup, and gained a walkover in the first round as scheduled opponents Shawlands Athletic had dissolved, but scratched when drawn against Clyde in the second. At the end of the season, it did not renew its Scottish FA membership, and so left senior football. The club played lower-level football until at least 1886, but the conversion of John Elder & Co. to a limited company seems to have ended the club's operation at any reportable level.

== Colours ==
The club's colours were 1" navy and white hooped jerseys (with a badge on the breast) and hose, with white knickers.

== Ground ==
The club played at Fairfield Park, also known as Dock Park, shared with Govan for a season until the latter club moved to Moore Park in 1877.
