= Rosslyn F.C. =

Former association football club in Scotland

Rosslyn
- Full name: Rosslyn Football Club
- Founded: 1876
- Dissolved: 1881
- Ground: Merkland Park
- Secretary: Charles W. Campbell/John Duncan
Home colours

Rosslyn Football Club was a 19th-century association football club based in Glasgow, Scotland.

== History ==
The club claimed a foundation date of 1871, but there are no matches recorded for it from before 1876, and no records of the club in the early years of the Scottish Football Association.

Rosslyn entered the Scottish Cup on three occasions. In 1877–78, the club beat Shaftesbury of Hillhead 3–1 away from home, and lost to Caledonian of Glasgow 1–0 in the second.

The following season, the club lost 1–0 at home to Union of Crosshill. The club had more than halved in size over a season, dropping from 53 members in 1878 to 25 in 1879.

The club's final entry, in 1879–80, saw the club get a walkover in the first round, as scheduled opponents Blackfriars had seemingly disbanded. In the second round the club lost 3–1 at Ailsa.

The final game recorded for the club was a 1–0 win at the 2nd XI of Carrick at the end of the 1880–81 season.

== Colours ==
The club's colours were navy blue jerseys and hose with white knickers, except for 1878–79 when the jerseys were white with a badge.

== Ground ==
The club's original ground was in Overnewton.

In September 1877, the club moved to a new ground at Brighton Park in Govan, however by December the club moved to a new ground in Partick.

In 1878–79 the club played at Merkland Park, but in 1879 moved to the University grounds, at least initially on a temporary basis, as Athole took over Merkland.
