= Annan Wanderers F.C. =

Former association football club in Scotland

Annan Wanderers
- Full name: Annan Wanderers Football Club
- Nickname(s): Wanderers
- Founded: 1876
- Dissolved: 1879
- Ground: Hillend
- President: Louis C. Salkeld Esq.
- Secretary: George Hope Jr
- Captain: Alex. Pollock
Home colours

Annan Wanderers F.C. was an association football club from Annan, Dumfriesshire, Scotland.

== History ==
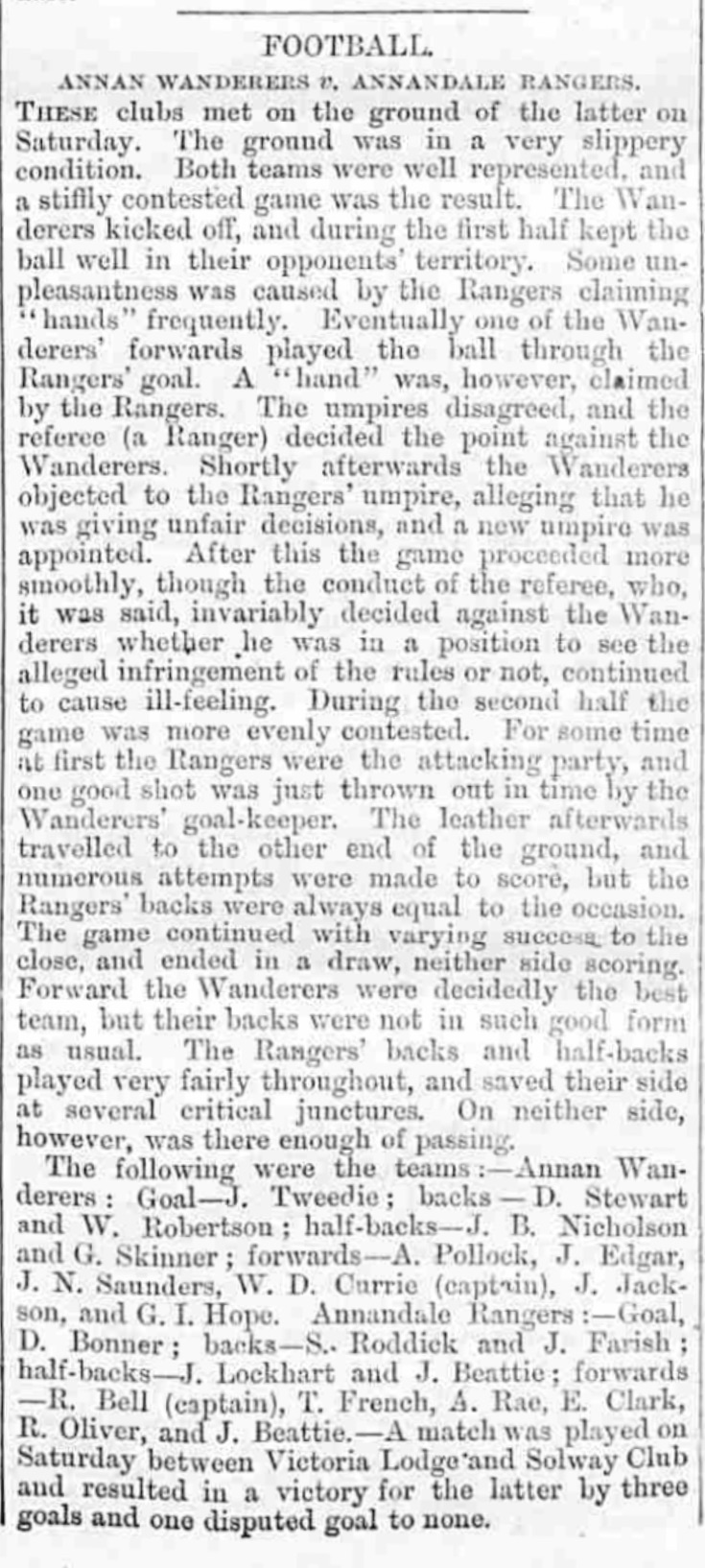
Annan Wanderers 0–0 Annandale Rangers, Annandale Observer and Advertiser, 18 January 1878

The village of Annan was one of the first places to adopt association football, the Annan N.B. Football Club being founded in December 1867, albeit it never seems to have played outside Dumfriesshire, its most notable opponent being the Kinmount side under the captaincy of the Marquess of Queensberry.

The Wanderers club was founded in 1876, its first recorded game against another club being a draw with Dumfries Wanderers in February 1877.

Given the paucity of other clubs, the Wanderers did not play many matches, and after 3 wins in 6 matches in 1878, the club joined the Scottish Football Association and entered the 1878–79 Scottish Cup. The regional nature of the draw meant the Wanderers were bound to play the only other senior side in the area, the Queen of the South Wanderers, and the clubs already had a keen rivalry - one match between the sides earlier in the year was left unfinished after the Dumfries side walked off in protest at a goal being given to Annan. The luck of the draw had the tie take place in Annan, but - despite the home side borrowing three Annan Rangers players for the match - the visitors side had an easy 3–0 victory, with one more goal not being allowed after the umpires could not agree as to whether the ball had gone in. Beattie in the visitors' goal only handled the ball once.

Annan entered the Scottish Cup again the following year, but, again with only the QotS Wanderers in its section of the draw, the clubs were again forced together, and, despite being drawn at home again, Annan was dissolved before playing the tie. A new club was promptly founded in September 1879, involving many of the same people as before (including patron Louis Salkeld and the Wanderers' last captain W. D. Currie), but it only lasted a couple of years.

== Colours ==
The club played in scarlet and white jerseys and hose, with white knickers. Whether consciously or not, this reflected the Annan N.B. colours of white with red caps.

== Ground ==
The club played at Hillend, half-a-mile from the railway station, and with a clubhouse on the grounds.
