= Alexandria F.C. =

Association football club in Dunbartonshire, Scotland

Alexandria
- Full name: Alexandria Cricket & Football Club
- Founded: 1877
- Dissolved: 1879
- Ground: Football & Cricket Ground, Balloch Road
- Secretary: James Purdon (1877), Hugh M'Nichol (1878)
Home colours

Alexandria Cricket and Football Club was an association football club based in the town of Alexandria, in Dunbartonshire.

== History ==
The club was founded in 1877, as a winter activity for members of the Alexandria Cricket Club, and was registered with the Scottish Football Association as the Alexandria Cricket club.

The club entered the Scottish Cup for the first time in 1877–78, and lost at home to Milngavie, who scored twice in the second half after Alexandria dominated the first.

Alexandria entered again the following year, and progressed through to the second round, after two draws with Renton Thistle, the first a 2–2 draw at home with goals from Abraham and Docherty either side of a brace for the Thistle, the second 1–1 at Renton; under the rules of the competition at the time, both clubs went through in those circumstances. In the second round, the club surrendered home advantage to Helensburgh, and lost 4–1. There is no further record for the club.

== Colours ==
The club's colours were blue and white "stripes" (in the context of the time, this refers to hoops) and white knickerbockers.

== Ground ==
The club played at the cricket ground on Balloch Road.
