= Marchtown F.C. =

Association football club in Glasgow City, Scotland

Marchtown
- Full name: Marchtown F.C.
- Founded: 1873
- Dissolved: 1879
- Ground: Pollokshields
- Match Secretary: John McDowall
Home colours

Marchtown Football Club was an association football club from Glasgow, notable for being the first "junior" competition winners in 1878.

== History ==
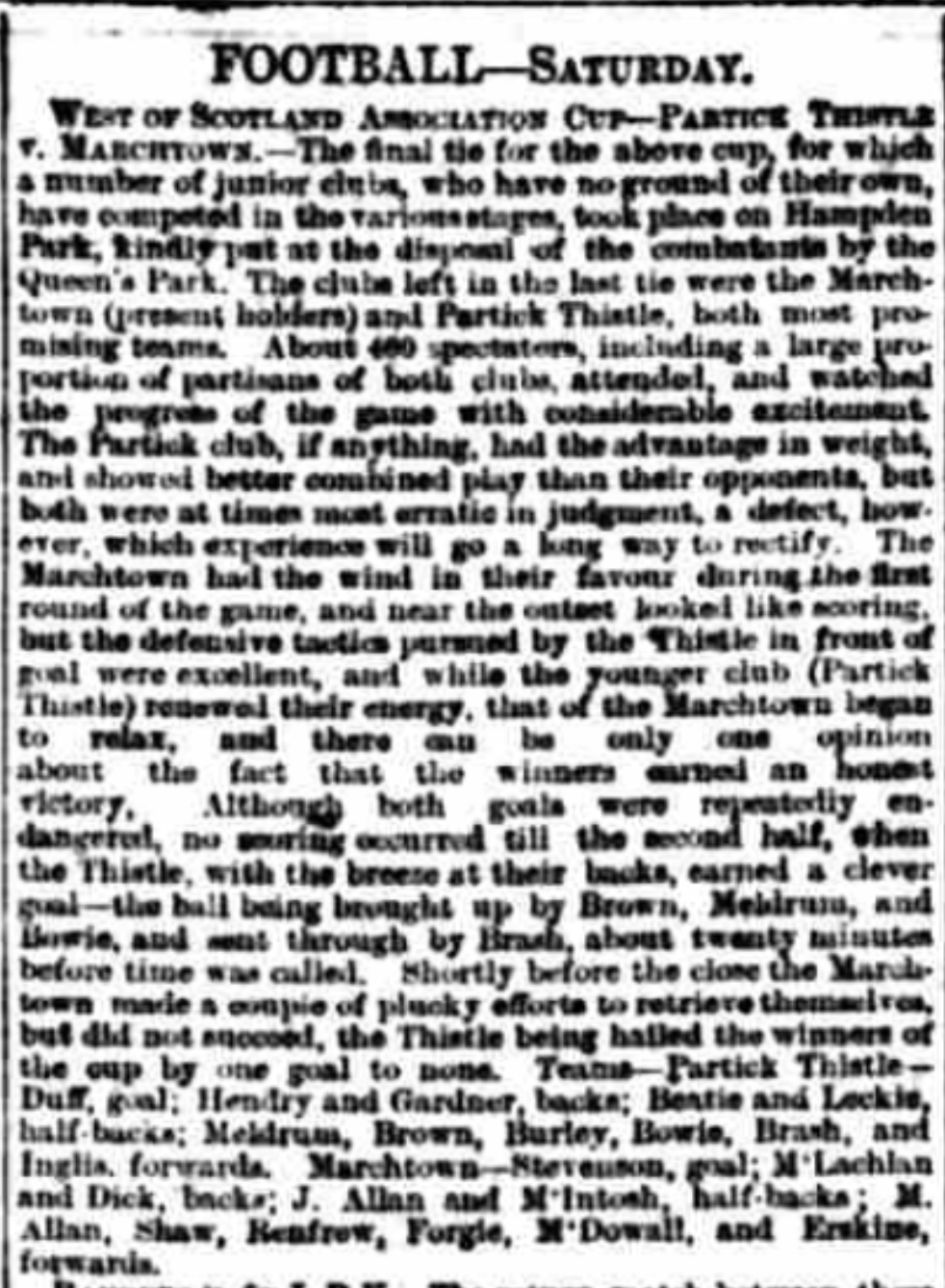
1878–79 West of Scotland Cup final, Partick Thistle 1–0 Marchtown, North British Daily Mail, 7 April 1879

The Marchtown club was the most successful of the "junior" clubs before the formation of the Scottish Junior Football Association. The club's name came from the former name of the Strathbungo district and the club's base was in Pollokshields.

The club claimed a foundation date of 1873, although its earliest recorded match is a draw with Thornliebank Rainbow in October 1877, played at Queen's Park, Glasgow. The previous month, the Scottish Football Association refused membership to a number of clubs without their own private grounds, and several clubs set up the West of Scotland Football Association to cater for those clubs. The new association set up the West of Scotland Cup, which Marchtown duly entered, along with over forty other sides. After beating (amongst others) Barrhead Rangers, the club reached the final, held at Rangers' Kinning Park, against Springfield. The game ended in a 1–1 draw, the game being "characterised by a good style of play" and before a "good turn-out of spectators", the teams taking supper together after the match in Middleton's Restaurant. The replay was more controversial, Marchtown scoring the only goal of the game after one of the umpires had raised a handball, but as play continued and the handling had no bearing on the goal itself, the goal was allowed, and Marchtown declared champion.

In 1878–79 it had a remarkable record of scoring 59 goals and claiming to have only conceding 2; one of the clubs it beat was the senior side Renfrew Ramblers. Unfortunately for the club, one of the goals conceded was against Partick Thistle in the West of Scotland Cup final, and it was the only goal of the game.

Despite the club's record proving it to be of senior standard, Marchtown did not take the step of joining the Scottish Football Association. However secretary John McDowall took up the same role at the Scottish FA from 1882. The final reference to a Marchtown club is in a defeat at Ardrossan Seafield in September 1881, although that was the only match recorded for Marchtown after 1879 so may have been a different side. It is possible that the Stevenson and McLachlan who played in the 1879 final are the same players as those of the same name and same position for Third Lanarkshire Rifle Volunteers in the early 1880s.

== Colours ==
The club wore broad blue and white hoops.

== Ground ==
The club played public parks, normally in Pollokshields.

== Notable players ==
- James Erskine, who later represented the Glasgow Select in a match against the Sheffield Football Association when a player for South Western.
