= Pollokshaws F.C. (1876) =

Association football club in Glasgow City, Scotland

Pollokshaws
- Full name: Pollokshaws F.C.
- Founded: 1876
- Dissolved: 1878
- Ground: Norwood Park
- Hon. Secretary: James Stewart
Home colours

Pollokshaws Football Club was an association football club from the village of Pollokshaws, at the time outside Glasgow, in Renfrewshire, which twice entered the Scottish Cup.

== History ==
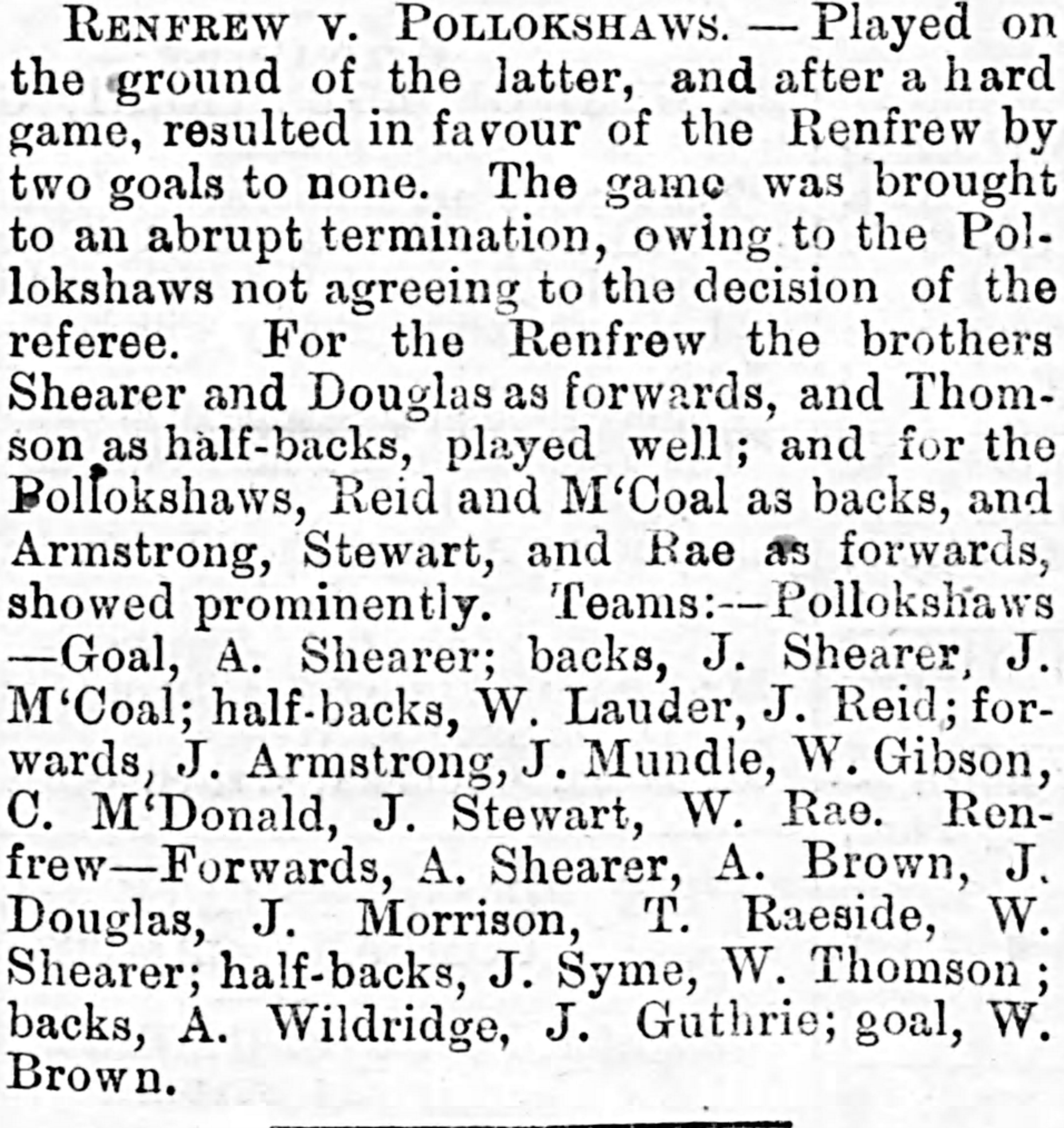
1877–78 Scottish Cup 1st Round, Pollokshaws 0–2 Renfrew, Paisley Daily Express, 8 October 1877

The club was founded in 1876. The earliest recorded match for the club was a 2–0 defeat to Thornliebank in October that year.

In its first season it won and lost 6 matches each, and drew 3 more, and off the back of that record joined the Scottish Football Association in August 1877.

Its only senior match, in the first round of the 1877–78 Scottish Cup, was not completed. At home to Renfrew, Pollokshaws had gone 2–0 down, when its players walked off in protest at a refereeing decision. The match was never re-played and Renfrew was put into the second round.

The club did enter the 1878–79 Scottish Cup but, after it was drawn at Port Glasgow, secretary James Stewart notified the Scottish Football Association that it had been dissolved.

== Colours ==
The club wore blue jerseys, white knickers, and black and white hose.

== Ground ==
The club's home ground was Norwood Park, on the Pollok estate. The ground was later used by the Maxwell and Granton clubs.
