= Uddingston F.C. =

Uddingston
- Full name: Uddingston Football Club
- Founded: 1877
- Dissolved: 1882
- Ground: Mayfield
- Hon. President: John Addie
- Secretary: Alex Inglis Jr
Home colours

Uddingston Football Club was a 19th-century football club based in Uddingston, Lanarkshire, Scotland.

== History ==
The club was formed in 1876, and was admitted to the Scottish Football Association at the start of the 1877–78 season. This entitled the club to enter the Scottish Cup for the first time. In the first round, the club won 3–1 at Newmilns, thanks to goals from the feet of M. M'Callum, J. Goldie, and J. Clark, and in the second the club won 3–0 at Hamilton.

That would however be the last Scottish Cup tie the club won. In the third round, with the Lanarkshire region joining the Glasgow region in the draw, the club lost 13–0 at Rangers, which remains Rangers' joint biggest margin of victory. Uddingston lost in the first round in 1878–79 (3–1 at Hamilton Academical, in a replay, with both games taking place at Hamiton's South Avenue) and 1880–81 (3–0 at Royal Albert), and withdrew after being drawn against Cambuslang in 1879–80.

Although the Lanarkshire Cup started in 1879–80, the club only entered once (in 1880–81), losing in the second round to Thistle of east Glasgow .

The final record of the club is its appearance in the 1881–82 Scottish Cup. It received a walkover in the first round from Upper Clydesdale but was beaten 10–0 by Thistle in the second, the first goal coming after five minutes and seven coming in the first half.

The club seems to have wound up after the 1881–82 season. There are references to matches for an Uddingston side in the mid-1880s but they appear to refer to a different junior club. A second Uddingston senior club was founded in 1887.

== Colours ==
The club played in the following:

- 1877–80: blue and white hooped shirts with white knickers and stockings
- 1880–81: all white
- 1881–82: black and white half-inch hooped jerseys, white knickers

== Grounds ==
The club played at private grounds 10 minutes' walk from the station, which was finally named in 1881 as Mayfield.
