= Govanhill F.C. =

Association football club in Glasgow City, Scotland

Govanhill Lacrosse
- Full name: Govanhill Lacrosse F.C.
- Founded: 1876
- Dissolved: 1882
- Ground: Bankhall Park
- Hon. Secretary: John C. Mackay, William Muir
- Match Secretary: James Thomson
Home colours

Govanhill Football Club was an association football club from Govanhill, in Renfrewshire, which at the time was a separate burgh to Glasgow.

== History ==
The club was founded out of a lacrosse club and was originally called Govanhill Lacrosse. Being an offshoot of an existing club meant that it had a large stock of members from which to choose a footballing XI, and in 1878, its 60 members made it one of the larger sides in the Glasgow area. Indeed, the earliest recorded fixture for the club was between its first two XIs at the start of 1878.

In April 1878, the club played in the second-ever football match in Falkirk, beating Falkirk F.C. 1–0 at Randyford (the ground of the East Stirlingshire cricket club).

Despite this advantage, it conceded a bye to Wellpark in its first Scottish Cup entry in 1878–79, possibly because it was not allowed to play as it did not have a private ground; instead it entered the West of Scotland Cup for teams playing on public parks, although its first round tie with Argyle was abandoned over a dispute relating to the only goal, and never seems to have been re-played. Its only tie in the Scottish Cup - in the first round the following season, by which time the club had shortened its name to Govanhill - was a 7–0 hammering at Whitefield, McDougall scoring five for the home side. Never an active club, it continued briefly into the 1880s as a Junior club.

== Colours ==
The club played in 1" blue and white hooped jerseys and white knickers.

== Ground ==
The club's ground as a senior club was at Bankhall Park, 1½ miles from St Enoch railway station. As a junior club, it played at Queen's Park.

== Notable players ==
- Kilpatrick, goalkeeper, also played for 3rd Lanarkshire Rifle Volunteers
