= Netherlee F.C. =

Association football club in Scotland

Netherlee
- Full name: Netherlee F.C.
- Founded: 1878
- Dissolved: 1884
- Ground: Netherlee Park
- Hon. President: Peter Fraser
- Match President: C. M'Kenzie
- Secretary: William Gourlay
Home colours

Netherlee Football Club was a Scottish football team that was active in the 1870s and 1880s. They were based in the village of Netherlee, in the parish of Cathcart, Renfrewshire.

== History ==
The club was founded in 1878, although an earlier Netherlee club was active in 1875 and 1876. Netherlee was one of the smallest clubs in Renfrewshire; in 1881, its 28-strong membership made it the smallest senior club in the county.

Unsurprisingly the club was entirely unsuccessful. It entered the Renfrewshire Cup twice, in 1879–80 and 1880–81, and lost both of its first round ties; 3–1 to Kennishead in 1879–80 and 5–3 to Pollok in 1880–81.

The club also never won a tie in the Scottish Cup in four entries, although its overall results were a little better. Indeed, in the club's first tie, in 1879–80, it drew 0–0 with Morton, a club with twice the membership, although Morton won the replay 7–4.

In 1880–81, Netherlee reached the second round, albeit only because opponents Oakfield had dissolved before the tie took place. Netherlee lost 2–0 to Yoker in the second round, and the following year the club lost at Wellington Park, the only victory for the Greenock club in the competition.

The club nearly gave up the unequal struggle in 1882, not paying its subscription to the Scottish Football Association, and therefore being unable to enter the cup competitions that year. The club however kept playing junior football, and re-joined the Association in August 1883, which entitled it to one last entry in the 1883–84 Scottish Cup. The club lost again in the first round, 5–2 at Greenock Southern. The club once more dropped off the SFA roll at the end of the season, this time never to return.

== Colours ==
The club wore white jerseys, navy knickers, and scarlet hose. In 1883 it changed its jerseys to black and white hoops.

== Ground ==
The club played at Netherlee Park, a 10-minute walk from the Cathcart omnibus stop, or from the Clarkston railway station.
