= Upper Clydesdale F.C. =

Uper Clydesdale
- Full name: Upper Clydesdale Football Club
- Founded: 1877
- Dissolved: 1881
- Ground: Shawfield Park
- President: Robert Coltart, J. G. Hutchinson
- Hon. secretary: John Macfarlane, Robert Coltart
Home colours	Change colours

Upper Clydesdale Football Club was a 19th-century football club based in Rutherglen, Lanarkshire, Scotland.

== History ==
The Strathclyde F.C. was one of the earliest senior clubs in Rutherglen, joining the Scottish Football Association soon after the club's founding in 1877. It entered the 1877–78 Scottish Cup, and beat West End 5–1 in the first round, but lost 8–1 at Partick in the second, being 2–1 down at half-time but conceding six in the second half.

The last fixture recorded for Strathclyde is a return fixture West End in January 1878. Before the 1878–79 season the club was re-founded as Upper Clydesdale, playing in almost the same colours, at the same ground, and with the only two known Strathclyde players (Coulter/Colthart and Williamson, also the Strathclyde secretary) playing for the Upper Clydesdale as well. There is one reference to a Strathclyde club playing against Eastern in October 1879 but as the game took place at Kelvinbank it refers to a different side.

By this time, the club had a membership of 70, making it second in Lanarkshire only to Drumpellier, which was a long-standing cricket club as well as football club.

The club entered the 1878–79 Scottish Cup and in the first round was drawn away at the established Newmains club. Upper Clydesdale ran riot, winning 12–0 and three of its players (Williamson, Muir, and Robert Colthart) scoring hat-tricks.

However the club never won another competitive match. It lost 7–0 at Jamestown in the second round, illustrating the strength of the game in Dunbartonshire, and 3–0 to Hamilton Academical in the second round the following year, conceding the first goal after 2 minutes, after a first-round walkover.

The club was a founder member of the Lanarkshire Association and entered the first Lanarkshire Cup in 1879–80, going out to Larkhall in the second round, having gained a walkover in the first when Cambuslang did not turn up. By 1880 its membership had reduced to 50, with many other Lanarkshire clubs now overtaking the club. It scratched from the next two editions of the Scottish Cup - in 1880–81 returning the favour to Cambuslang, who walked over into the second round - which meant it was automatically expelled from the Scottish Football Association.

== Colours ==
Strathclyde wore royal and navy blue hooped jerseys, and white knickers. As Upper Clydesdale, the club wore the same colours, but with a red star added to the left breast. The club's change colours were white and blue, probably in hoops.

== Grounds ==
The club played at Shawfield Park, Rutherglen Bridge, a five-minute walk from Bridgeton Cross. From 1880 the ground was shared by Glasgow Thistle.
