= Renfrew Ramblers F.C. =

Former association football club in Scotland

Renfrew Ramblers
- Full name: Renfrew Ramblers F.C.
- Founded: 1875
- Dissolved: 1880
- Ground: Longcroft Park
- Chairman: A. Thomson
- Secretary: Alex Fraser, John Elder
Home colours

Renfrew Ramblers Football Club was a Scottish football team located in the town of Renfrew.

== History ==
The club was founded in 1875, the same year as Renfrew F.C.; indeed the first recorded match for the Ramblers was against Renfrew in March 1876. Its first full season was successful, with 12 wins and only 3 defeats in 24 matches.

The club had a disadvantage to the Renfrew club as it did not have its own ground, playing instead at a public park. As a result, the Scottish Football Association rejected the Ramblers' application for membership in 1877 because of its lack of private facilities. The club therefore joined the West of Scotland Football Association, set up with other similarly rejected clubs, and entered the West of Scotland Cup for 1877–78. However the Ramblers scratched before playing a tie.

The Ramblers finally joined the Scottish FA in 1879, after a season in which it won 10 of its 14 games, as it had obtained use of a private ground. It only enjoyed the 1879–80 season as a senior club, in which its record was, on the face of it, similar to Renfrew's, with 7 wins and 7 defeats in 17 matches. However Renfrew had signed up 65 members, while the Ramblers were behind on 40, and the gap was already too big to make up. The club did not even join the Renfrewshire Association, so could not play in the Renfrewshire Cup.

In its one senior season, the Ramblers played in the Scottish Cup for the only time. It had a walkover in the first round as opponents 23rd R.R.V. had disbanded before the tie was played. In the second it lost 2–1 at home to Barrhead Rangers. It also lost in the final of the Yoker Cup, a competition the club had won in 1878–79, 2–0 to Jordanhill in front of a small but enthusiastic crowd of 500.

The Ramblers entered the Cup in 1880–81, and was drawn at home to Yoker, but scratched from the tie, and there is no further record of the club; the last regular XI match it is known to have played was a 3–0 win at St Mirren in May 1880. The name was revived in 1886 for a short-lived Junior club.

== Colours ==
The club wore the same dark blue shirts, white knickers, and blue and white hose as did Renfrew F.C.

== Ground ==
The club originally played at a public park in Renfrew before securing its own private ground at Longcroft Park on Inchinnan Road in 1879. The club's first home match on its own private turf was a charity match, to raise funds for the Renfrew unemployed, against the Springfield side from Partick, in March that year.
