= Wellington Park F.C. (Greenock) =

Former association football club in Scotland

Wellington Park
- Full name: Wellington Park F.C.
- Founded: 1876
- Dissolved: 1882
- Ground: Wellington Park
- Secretary: Jas. Park, James M'Cowam
Home colours

Wellington Park Football Club was a Scottish football team located in the town of Greenock, Renfrewshire.

== History ==
The club was founded in 1876, with 30 members, which made it bigger than Greenock Morton, founded in the same year. It took its name from the public park where it played its earliest matches. The first recorded match for the club was against Union in January 1877.

The club was however unsuccessful. It entered the Scottish Cup every season from 1877–78 to 1881–82. It lost in the first round in its first four entries. The club never grew from its initial membership. In 1881 it was still claiming a membership of 30; by then, not only was Morton more than twice the size, but the new club Greenock Southern had already overtaken it.

The club had not joined the Renfrewshire Football Association at its foundation, but did so during the 1880–81 season. An error by the Renfrewshire F.A. meant that neither Wellington Park nor Shawlands Athletic was notified as to decisions in relation to entry to the Renfrewshire Cup, so both sides were allowed into the competition at the fourth round stage, to play each other. Shawlands won 4–1 at the Park, and the Park never entered the competition again.

It did however enter the Scottish Cup one last time in 1881–82, and won a tie for the only time, when it beat Netherlee 4–1 in the first round. In the second the club lost 4–3 at home to Kilbarchan in a tie played at Cappielow Park; notably one of the club's best players in the tie, Barr, was not a Wellington Park player, but had been borrowed from Kilbirnie. Wellington's protest that Kilbarchan, whose colours were registered as navy jerseys, had played in five different colours, one of which was the same as Wellington's, was dismissed, on the basis that the competition committee had no right to interfere. There are no recorded matches for the club over the rest of the season and the club was duly deleted from the Scottish Football Association membership roll in August 1882.

== Colours ==
The club wore scarlet and blue jerseys and hose, with white knickers.

== Ground ==
The club played at Wellington Park, at the foot of Whinhill, 5 minutes' walk from Lynedoch railway station. By 1878 it had carved out a private ground on the park.
