= Grasshoppers F.C. =

Former association football club in Scotland

Grasshoppers
- Full name: Grasshoppers Football Club
- Nickname(s): the Hoppers
- Founded: 1875
- Dissolved: 1901
- Ground: Longcroft Park (1886–1901)
Home colours

Grasshoppers Football Club, sometimes known as Bonnybridge Grasshoppers, was a Scottish association football club based in Bonnybridge, Stirlingshire. The club was founded in 1875 and disbanded in 1901. The club was called Longcroft Thistle for a year in 1886–87 after relocating to the nearby village of Longcroft. The club competed in the Scottish Cup for periods between 1876 and 1890 and also the regional Stirlingshire Cup competition.

== History ==
Grasshoppers Football Club was founded in 1875 and played its first home matches at Bonnyside Fields until 1877. The club played for short periods at other grounds including two spells at Peathill Park between 1877–79 and 1884–86, Seabegs between 1879 and 1881, Milnquarter between 1881 and 1884 before lastly moving to Longcroft Park between 1886 and 1901 which was located in the nearby village of Longcroft. For the first season at Longcroft Park, in 1886–87, the club changed its name to Longcroft Thistle (sometimes Thistle) and in around August 1887 it was struck from the Scottish Football Association membership roll after failing to pay a subscription charge. The club returned in 1889 and its original name was resurrected until the club disbanded in 1901.

Grasshoppers first entered in the Scottish Cup in the 1876–77 season, the fourth staging of the tournament. In the first round the club was drawn against St. Andrew's from Edinburgh and lost the match 1–0. The following season, Grasshoppers entered the competition in the second round and won against Clifton & Strathfillan from Tyndrum and qualified for the third round, the furthest the club progressed, losing 4–0 to Jordanhill. Grasshoppers went on to compete in the tournament for nine more seasons, the last in 1890–91 when its heaviest defeat of 12–1 was inflicted by Union of Dumbarton. In the years following, the club failed to progress past the preliminary rounds to qualify for the Scottish Cup.

== Scottish Cup record ==
- First Scottish Cup match: v St. Andrew's, 30 September 1876
- Highest winning margin (four goals): 4–0 v Dunipace, 13 September 1884
- Highest losing margin (eleven goals): 12–1 v Union, 6 September 1890
