= Union F.C. (Glasgow) =

Association football club in Glasgow City, Scotland

Union
- Full name: Union Football Club
- Founded: 1873
- Dissolved: 1880
- Ground: Queen's Park
- Secretary: James R. Murdoch
Home colours

Union Football Club was a 19th-century football club based in Glasgow.

== History ==
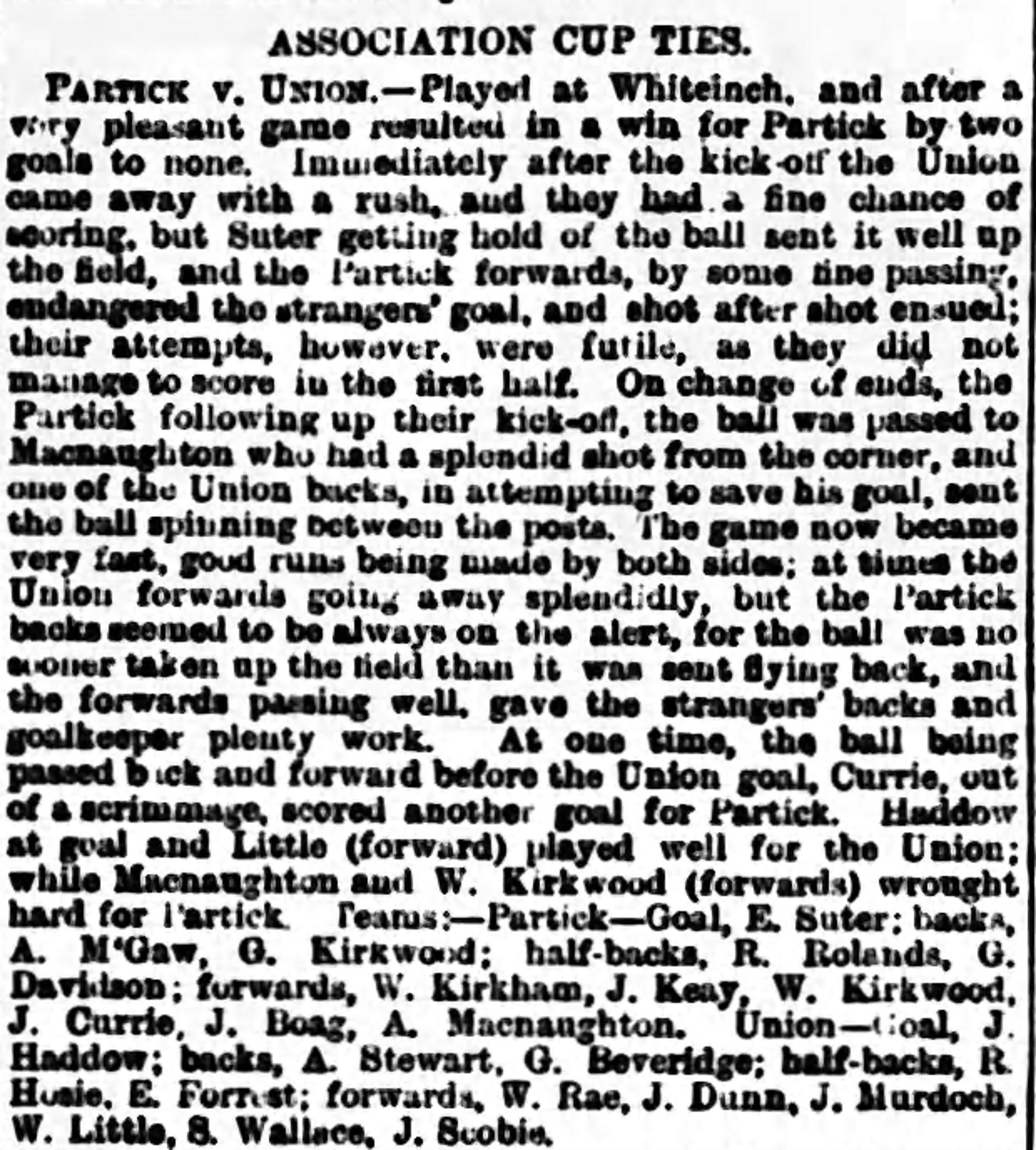
Report on the 1877 Cup defeat by Partick, from the North British Daily Mail

The club was founded in 1873. The first recorded match against another side was at Govan in October 1875.

It was not a major club; it did not play any of more prestigious clubs in Glasgow at the time, such as Queen's Park, Clydesdale, or Rangers. It had fielded a second XI in 1875–76, but by 1877 its membership was 21, the smallest recorded in Charles Alcock's Football Annual for the year. The club's secretary, James Murdoch of Prince Edward Street in Crosshill, was a commercial traveller and nearing his forties when the club was founded.

The only major fixtures in which the club participated were in the Scottish Cup. In 1877–78, Union lost 2–0 at the original Partick club. In 1878–79, Union won its first round tie against fellow Glaswegian club Rosslyn, at the latter's Merkland Park, the only goal being scored by R. Wallace. The club went out in the second round to Parkgrove by the same score, at Trinidad Park in Govan, having been pressed all match and Parkgrove having two goals disallowed; goalkeeper Borland received praise from the press, and, perhaps not coincidentally, is reported as playing for Parkgrove later in the season.

The club scratched when overmatched with 3rd Lanarkshire Rifle Volunteers in the first round in 1879–80. The club did continue playing in the season, the last recorded fixture being a 1–0 win over the obscure Eldon club.

== Colours ==
The club played in blue jerseys, white knickerbockers, and blue stockings.

== Grounds ==
The club played at the Queen's Park, Glasgow, and did not have its own clubhouse.
