= Harmonic F.C. =

Association football club in Glasgow City, Scotland

Harmonic
- Full name: Good Templars' Harmonic Football Club
- Nickname: the Harmonic
- Founded: 1878
- Dissolved: 1882
- Ground: Onslow Park
- Match Secretary: George Falconer
- Hon. Secretary: Andrew Watson,
Home colours

Harmonic Football Club was a Scottish association football club based in Dennistoun, in Glasgow.

== History ==
The club was founded in 1878, as an athletic division of the Glasgow branch of the International Organisation of Good Templars, and its earliest recorded match comes from the end of the 1878–79 season. The club was often known as Good Templars Harmonic or similar, the Harmonic referring to weekly entertainments which the group used to hold.

The Harmonic entered the Scottish Cup from 1879–80 to 1881–82. The club reached the second round in every season, without winning a match, as in each tournament its opponent scratched or had disbanded before the first round.

The club's first Cup tie was therefore in the second round in 1879–80, at Alexandra Athletic, which its opponents won 5–0. A measure of the strength of Glasgow football at the time is shown by Harmonic, one of the minor clubs in the city, beating Hanover, one of the leading clubs in Edinburgh, 3–0 in a friendly in November 1879. The club was also good enough to beat Cowlairs in the same month. Harmonic's only competitive wins come in the same season, in the Royal Standard and Grand National Halls Cup for teams in and around Gorbals.

The Harmonic had a better Scottish Cup showing in 1880–81, drawing its second round tie 1–1 with Clyde, W. Smith equalizing a Clyde goal before half-time, and pressing its opponents for most of the second-half without breaking through. Clyde however won the replay at Barrowfield Park, scoring the only goal of the game "by some clever play".

The replay proved to be Harmonic's last Scottish Cup tie; when scheduled to face Rangers in the second round in 1881–82, the Harmonic scratched, allowing Rangers to play a friendly against St Bernard's instead. The club's last recorded fixtures come later in the month, against Paisley Athletic.

== Colours ==
The club originally gave its colours as Oxford and Cambridge blue. In 1880 the club played in light blue jerseys, white knickerbockers, and blue stockings.

== Ground ==
The club played at Onslow Park, two minutes' walk from the Dennistoun car stop, which had previously been the ground of the Dennistoun club.

== See also ==
- Greenock Abstainers F.C., Good Templar football club in Greenock
- Vale of Avon F.C., Good Templar football club in Strathaven
