= 1884–85 Morton F.C. season =

Morton
1884–85 season
- Scottish Cup: Fifth round (lost to Hibernian)
- Highest home attendance: c. 4,000 v. Abercorn (27 September 1884, Scottish Cup)

The 1884–85 season was Morton Football Club's eighth season in which they competed at a national level, entering the Scottish Cup.

== Fixtures and results ==
Win Draw Loss Postponed

=== Scottish Cup ===
13 September 1884 First Round	Morton	2 – 2	Abercorn	Cappielow Park
	Fleming; Barrie		Dutch; McGinty

20 September 1884 First Round Replay	Abercorn	3 – 4 ^{[note 1]}	Morton	Blackstoun Park
	,,		,,,	Attendance: 4,000

27 September 1884 First Round Replay	Abercorn	2 – 2 ^{[note 2]}	Morton	Blackstoun Park
	Dutch ?		Nugent; Walker	Attendance: 4,000

4 October 1884 Second Round	Morton	Bye

25 October 1884 Third Round	Morton	5 – 0	Greenock Southern	Cappielow Park
	McKinnon; Barrie; McKendrick,,

15 November 1884 Fourth Round	Wishaw Swifts	1 – 2	Morton
	Goal		? Nugent

6 December 1884 Fifth Round	Hibernian	4 – 0	Morton	Hibernian Park
	McGrail ?,,

1. An Abercorn protest was upheld and the game was ordered to be replayed.
2. Abercorn and Morton both qualified for the second round.

=== Renfrewshire Cup ===
1 November 1884 First Round	Morton	6 – 1	Cartavale	Cappielow Park
	Fleming; McKendrick, Cameron,		Goal

22 November 1884 Second Round	Clippens	0 – 1	Morton	Moss Park
			Goal

20 December 1884 Third Round	St. Mirren	3 – 4	Morton	Westmarch
	Brown og ?		Barrie; Brown, Nugent	Referee: Mr Goudie (Rangers)

7 February 1885 Semi Final	Morton	2 – 2 ^{[note 3]}	Arthurlie	Cappielow Park
	Fleming; McKendrick		Ketterson; McCowat	Attendance: 4000; Referee: James Aitken (Johnstone)

14 February 1885 Semi Final	Morton	2 – 2	Arthurlie	Cappielow Park
	McKendrick,		McPherson,	Attendance: 6000; Referee: Mr Bell (Renfrew)

21 February 1885 Semi Final Replay	Arthurlie	1 – 1	Morton	Dunterlie Park
	Goal		Mills	Attendance: 2000; Referee: Mr J.G. Bell

7 March 1885 Semi Final Replay	Arthurlie	2 – 3	Morton	Blackstoun Park
	McPherson ?		Fleming; Brown; Nugent	Attendance: 6000; Referee: Mr J.G. Bell

21 March 1885 Final	Port Glasgow Athletic	2 – 1	Morton	Westmarch
	Brown; McCartney		Barrie	Attendance: 8000; Referee: Mr J.G. Bell

3. A Morton protest was upheld and the fixture was ordered to be replayed.

=== Greenock Charity Cup ===
25 April 1885 First Round	Morton	5 – 2	Greenock Northern	Cappielow Park
	Hughes; McKendrick, Fleming ?		? Barrie

14 May 1885 Semi Final	Morton	10 – 3	Greenock Rangers	Cappielow Park
	,,,,,,,,,		,,

30 May 1885 Final	Morton	0 – 0	Port Glasgow Athletic	Cappielow Park
				Attendance: 5000; Referee: Mr J Nesbit (Queen's Park)

6 June 1885 Final Replay	Port Glasgow Athletic	3 – 2 ^{[note 4]}	Morton	Bogston Park
	Graham,,		? og	Attendance: 7000; Referee: Mr Robertson

4. Game was abandoned near full time due to a pitch invasion. A replay was ordered, which Athletic declined so Morton were awarded the cup.

=== Friendlies ===
16 August 1884 Friendly	Morton	3 – 3	Pilgrims	Cappielow Park
	Aitken; Campbell; Hughes		,,

23 August 1884 Friendly	Partick Thistle	4 – 2	Morton
	,,,		,

30 August 1884 Friendly	Morton	9 – 1	Royal Scots Greys	Cappielow Park
	Walker, McKinnon,, Fleming, Malcolm,		Goal

4 October 1884 Friendly	Morton	2 – 3	Clyde	Cappielow Park
	McKendrick,		,,

18 October 1884 Friendly	Morton	2 – 0	Olympic	Cappielow Park
	McKendrick; McKinnon

29 November 1884 Friendly	Morton	4 – 1	Renfrew	Cappielow Park
	? McKendrick, Fleming

27 December 1884 Friendly	Morton	5 – 0	1st Renfrewshire Rifle Volunteers	Cappielow Park
	,,,,

1 January 1885 Friendly	Arbroath	2 – 3	Morton	Gayfield Park
	,		,,

3 January 1885 Friendly	Morton	1 – 2	Annbank	Cappielow Park
	Nugent		,

10 January 1885 Friendly	Renfrew	3 – 1	Morton	Glebe Street
	,,		Goal

17 January 1885 Friendly	Morton	2 – 2	Greenock Northern	Cappielow Park
	McKendrick; McKinnon		? Barrie

24 January 1885 Friendly	Morton	5 – 3	Ayr	Cappielow Park
	McKendrick,, Nugent; Barrie		? og Lindsay

31 January 1885 Friendly	Morton	6 – 4	Olympic	Cappielow Park
	Fleming; Nugent; McKenzie,,		,,,

14 March 1885 Friendly	1st Renfrewshire Rifle Volunteers	2 – 1	Morton	Academy Park
	,		Goal

28 March 1885 Friendly	Morton	0 – 4	Hibernian	Cappielow Park
			,,,

4 April 1885 Friendly	Morton	2 – 1	Pilgrims	Cappielow Park
	,		Goal

11 April 1885 Friendly	Morton	2 – 2	Thornliebank	Cappielow Park
	Lindsay; Fleming		,

4 April 1885 Friendly	Morton	3 – 0	Greenock Southern	Cappielow Park
	,,
