= 1883–84 Scottish Cup =

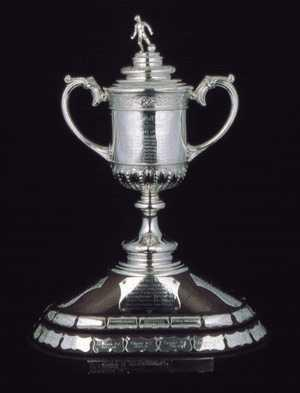
- The Scottish Cup trophy

Tournament details
- Country: Scotland
- Teams: 132

Final positions
- Champions: Queen's Park (seventh title)
- Runners-up: Vale of Leven

Tournament statistics
- Matches played: 127
- Goals scored: 712 (5.61 per match)

The 1883–84 Scottish Cup – officially the Scottish Football Association Challenge Cup – was the 11th season of Scotland's most prestigious football knockout competition. Queen's Park won the competition for the seventh time after Vale of Leven could not field a team on the date fixed for the final due to player illness.

Reigning champions Dumbarton were knocked out in the first round by neighbours Renton, becoming the first club not to make at least two successful defences of their title since its inception (Queen's Park and Vale of Leven each won three in a row, then Queen's Park won three more) and beginning a contrasting sequence whereby the winners changed each season for the next 13 years, until Rangers retained the trophy in 1898.

== Calendar ==
Round	First match date	Fixtures			Clubs
Round	First match date	Original	Byes	Replays	Clubs
First Round	8 September 1883	63	6	8	132 → 70
Second Round	29 September 1883	32	6	1	70 → 38
Third Round	20 October 1883	17	4	4	38 → 21
Fourth Round	3 November 1883	10	1	0	21 → 11
Fifth Round	1 December 1883	3	5	1	11 → 8
Quarter-finals	22 December 1883	4	0	0	8 → 4
Semi-finals	19 January 1884	2	0	0	4 → 2
Final	23 February 1884	1	0	0	2 → 1

- Edinburgh University were given a bye to the third round.
- Two teams qualified for the second round after drawing their first round replay.

Notes

1. A-The date that the final was scheduled to be played.

== Teams ==
All 132 teams entered the competition in the first round.

Ayrshire	Glasgow and district	Lanarkshire	Northern Counties	Renfrewshire
Annbank; Ayr; Beith; Beith Thistle; Cumnock; Hurlford; Kilbirnie; Kilmarnock; Kilmarnock Athletic; Kilmarnock Portland; Lugar Boswell; Mauchline; Maybole; Stewarton Cunninghame	Alexandra Athletic; Battlefield; Clyde; Cowlairs; Dean Park; Glencairn; Granton; Luton; Mavisbank; Northern; Orchard; Partick; Partick Thistle; Pilgrims; Pollokshields Athletic; Possilpark; Queen's Park; Rangers; South Western; Thistle; Whitefield; Whitehill; 3rd Lanark RV	Airdrie; Airdrieonians; Bellshill; Cambuslang; Clarkston; Drumpellier; Hamilton Academical; Plains Blue Bell; Royal Albert; Shettleston; Tollcross; Vale of Avon; West Benhar	Aberdeen; Angus; Arbroath; Balgay; Coupar Angus; Dundee East End; Dundee Harp; Dundee Hibernian; Dundee Our Boys; Dundee West End; Perseverance; Strathmore (Arbroath); Strathmore (Dundee)	Abercorn; Arthurlie; Bute Rangers; Caledonia; Cartvale; Clippens; Glenpatrick; Johnstone; Johnstone Athletic; Johnstone Rovers; Kilbarchan; Levern; Linwood; Lochwinnoch; Lyle Athletic; Northern (Greenock); Morton; Netherlee; Olympic; Paisley Athletic; Pollok; Port Glasgow Athletic; Renfrew; St Mirren; Sir John Maxwell; Southern (Greenock); Thornliebank; West End Athletic; Woodland; Yoker
Dunbartonshire	Edinburghshire	Perthshire	Southern Counties	Stirlingshire
Dumbarton; Dunbritton; Jamestown; Kilmaronock Thistle; Levendale; Renton; Vale of Leven; Vale of Leven Wanderers	Brunswick; Dunfermline; Edina; Edinburgh University; Heart of Midlothian; Hibernian; Kinleith; Newcastleton; St Bernard's; West Calder	Breadalbane; Dunblane; Vale of Athole; Vale of Teith	Drumlanrig Rangers; East End Rovers; Moffat; Newton Stewart Athletic; Queen of the South Wanderers; Vale of Nith; 5th Kirkcudbrightshire RV	Alloa Athletic; Campsie; Dunipace; East Stirlingshire; Falkirk; King's Park; Lenzie; Stenhousemuir; Strathblane; Tayavalla

== First round ==
=== Matches ===
==== Glasgow and district ====
Cowlairs received a bye to the second round.

8 September 1883	Possilpark	2–4	Orchard	Possilpark
				Stadium: Saracen Park

8 September 1883	Dean Park	1–2	Mavisbank	Govan
				Stadium: Woodville Park

8 September 1883	Pollokshields Athletic	4–1	Thistle	Pollokshields
				Stadium: Pollok Park

8 September 1883	3rd Lanark RV	5–2	Clyde	Crosshill
				Stadium: Cathkin Park

8 September 1883	Northern	0–1	Rangers	Glasgow
			Gossland	Stadium: Hyde Park

8 September 1883	Whitehill	3–1	Alexandra Athletic	Glasgow
				Stadium: Haghill Park

8 September 1883	Partick	0–8	Queen's Park	Partick
				Stadium: Inchview

8 September 1883	Battlefield	8–1	South Western	Langside
				Stadium: Overdale Park

8 September 1883	Granton	3–1	Glencairn	Govan
				Stadium: Norwood Park

Luton	w/o	Whitefield

Partick Thistle	w/o	Pilgrims

==== Renfrewshire district ====
8 September 1883	Abercorn	7–0	Levern	Paisley
				Stadium: Blackstoun Park

8 September 1883	Kilbarchan	3–4	Paisley Athletic	Kilbarchan
				Stadium: Whitlands

8 September 1883	Arthurlie	3–0	Pollok	Barrhead
				Stadium: Dunterlie Park

8 September 1883	St Mirren	6–0	Caledonia	Paisley
				Stadium: Westmarch

8 September 1883	Johnstone	3–4	Thornliebank	Johnstone
				Stadium: Cartbank Park

8 September 1883	Linwood	1–4	Woodland	Linwood

8 September 1883	Greenock Northern	5–3	Sir John Maxwell	Greenock
				Stadium: Bogston Park

8 September 1883	Netherlee	2–5	Greenock Southern	Netherlee
				Stadium: Netherlee Park

8 September 1883	Lyle Athletic	2–4	Johnstone Rovers	Greenock
				Stadium: Ladyburn Park

8 September 1883	Morton	1–0	Renfrew	Greenock
				Stadium: Cappielow

8 September 1883	Clippens	3–2	Johnstone Athletic	Linwood
				Stadium: Moss Park

8 September 1883	Cartvale	8–0	West End Athletic	Busby
				Stadium: Cartbridge Park

8 September 1883	Yoker	0–2	Olympic	Yoker
				Stadium: Holm Park

Glenpatrick	w/o	Bute Rangers

Lochwinnoch	w/o	Port Glasgow Athletic

==== Ayrshire district ====
8 September 1883	Annbank	1–3	Mauchline	Annbank
				Stadium: Pebble Park

8 September 1883	Lugar Boswell	3–1	Ayr	Lugar
				Stadium: Rosebank Park

22 September 1883	Cumnock	4–0	Maybole	Cumnock
				Stadium: New Station Field

Kilmarnock Athletic	w/o	Beith

Kilmarnock	w/o	Kilbirnie

Kilmarnock Portland	w/o	Stewarton Cunninghame

Beith Thistle	w/o	Hurlford

==== Dunbartonshire district ====
8 September 1883	Vale of Leven	12–0	Leverndale	Alexandria
				Stadium: North Street Park

8 September 1883	Renton	2–1	Dumbarton	Renton
	McIntyre		Keir	Stadium: Tontine Park; Attendance: 3,000

8 September 1883	Vale of Leven Wanderers	1–1	Dunbritton	Alexandria
				Stadium: Institute Park

Kilmaronock Thistle	w/o	Jamestown

==== Lanarkshire district ====
Vale of Avon received a bye to the second round.

8 September 1883	Drumpellier	2–2	West Benhar	Coatbridge
				Stadium: Drumpellier Cricket Ground

8 September 1883	Hamilton Academical	4–1	Airdrieonians	Hamilton
				Stadium: South Haugh

8 September 1883	Royal Albert	8–0	Shettleston	Larkhall
				Stadium: Raploch Park

8 September 1883	Airdrie	1–0 (void)	Tollcross	Airdrie
				Stadium: Rochsoles

8 September 1883	Cambuslang	8–0	Bellshill	Cambuslang
				Stadium: Westburn Park

Clarkston	w/o	Plains Blue Bell

==== Stirlingshire district ====
8 September 1883	Dunipace	2–1	Campsie	Denny
				Stadium: Broomhill Farm

8 September 1883	Alloa Athletic	0–5	Falkirk	Alloa
				Stadium: Gaberston Park

8 September 1883	East Stirlingshire	3–0	Tayavalla	Falkirk
				Stadium: Randyford Park

15 September 1883	Strathblane	2–3	Stenhousemuir	Strathblane
				Stadium: Cuilt Park

15 September 1883	King's Park	11–0	Lenzie	Stirling
				Stadium: Forthbank Park

==== Edinburghshire district ====
Newcastleton received a bye to the second round. Edinburgh University received a bye to the third round.

8 September 1883	Edina	2–1 (void)	Kinleith	Edinburgh
				Stadium: Craigmillar Park

8 September 1883	Hibernian	5–0	West Calder	Edinburgh
				Stadium: Hibernian Park

8 September 1883	Heart of Midlothian	8–0	Brunswick	Edinburgh
	Wood (x6); Ronaldson; Lees			Stadium: Tynecastle Fields

15 September 1883	Dunfermline	1–13	St Bernard's	Dunfermline
				Stadium: Ladysmill Park

==== Northern Counties ====
Coupar Angus received a bye to the second round.

8 September 1883	Dundee Harp	9–0	Angus	Dundee
				Stadium: Viewforth Park

8 September 1883	Balgay	2–2	Strathmore (Arbroath)	Dundee
				Stadium: Flinchar Craig Park

8 September 1883	Dundee West End	2–3	Dundee Our Boys	Dundee
				Stadium: Balgay Farm

8 September 1883	Perseverance	2–2	Dundee Hibernian	Dundee
				Stadium: Magdalene Park

8 September 1883	Arbroath	3–3	Aberdeen	Arbroath
				Stadium: Gayfield Park

8 September 1883	Dundee East End	0–1	Strathmore (Dundee)	Dundee
				Stadium: Madeira Park

==== Perthshire district ====
8 September 1883	Dunblane	2–1	Vale of Teith	Dunblane
				Stadium: Kippenross Park

Vale of Athole	w/o	Breadalbane

==== Southern Counties ====
Drumlanrig Rangers received a bye to the second round.

8 September 1883	Vale of Nith	2–4	Moffat	Dumfries
				Stadium: Milldamhead Park

8 September 1883	Queen of the South Wanderers	7–7	5th Kirkcudbrightshire RV	Dumfries
				Stadium: Nunholm

East End Rovers	w/o	Newton Stewart Athletic

=== Replays ===
==== Dunbartonshire district ====
15 September 1883	Dunbritton	4–0	Vale of Leven Wanderers	Dumbarton
				Stadium: Woodyard Park

==== Lanarkshire district ====
15 September 1883	West Benhar	12–0	Drumpellier	Harthill
				Stadium: Harthill Mains

22 September 1883	Tollcross	4–3 (a.e.t.)	Airdrie	Glasgow
				Stadium: Wellshot Park

==== Edinburghshire district ====
22 September 1883	Edina	4–0	Kinleith	Edinburgh
				Stadium: Craigmillar Park

==== Northern Counties ====
15 September 1883	Strathmore (Arbroath)	1–1	Balgay	Arbroath
				Stadium: Gayfield Park

15 September 1883	Dundee Hibernian	3–4	Perseverance	Dundee
				Stadium: West Craigie Park

15 September 1883	Arbroath	7–0	Aberdeen	Arbroath
				Stadium: Gayfield Park

==== Southern Counties ====
15 September 1883	5th Kirkcudbrightshire RV	3–1	Queen of the South Wanderers	Dumfries
				Stadium: Palmerston Park

Notes

1. A-Glenpatrick were disqualified for not turning up.
2. B-A protest by Tollcross that the pitch markings were unclear was upheld and a replay was ordered.
3. C-A protest by Kinleith was upheld and a replay was ordered.
4. D-The 7–7 draw between Queen of the South Wanderers and 5th Kirkcudbrightshire RV is the highest-scoring drawn match ever played in the Scottish Cup.
5. E-Both teams qualified for the second round.

== Second round ==
=== Matches ===
==== Glasgow and District ====
29 September 1883	Cowlairs	3–2	Granton	Glasgow
				Stadium: Gourlay Park

29 September 1883	Battlefield	7–2	Whitefield	Langside
				Stadium: Overdale Park

29 September 1883	Pollokshields Athletic	6–2	Mavisbank	Pollokshields
				Stadium: Pollok Park

29 September 1883	3rd Lanark RV	2–4	Queen's Park	Crosshill
				Stadium: Cathkin Park

29 September 1883	Rangers	14–2	Whitehill	Kinning Park
	McHardy			Stadium: Kinning Park

29 September 1883	Partick Thistle	8–1	Orchard	Partick
				Stadium: Muirpark

==== Renfrewshire district ====
Morton received a bye to the third round.

29 September 1883	Cartvale	6–2	Greenock Southern	Busby
				Stadium: Cartbridge Park

29 September 1883	Port Glasgow Athletic	1–3	Arthurlie	Port Glasgow
				Stadium: Clune Park

29 September 1883	Olympic	5–0	Clippens	Paisley
				Stadium: Thistle Park

29 September 1883	Abercorn	2–0	Paisley Athletic	Paisley
				Stadium: Blackstoun Park

29 September 1883	Thornliebank	14–0	Bute Rangers	Thornliebank
				Stadium: Deacon's Bank Park

29 September 1883	St Mirren	7–0	Woodland	Paisley
				Stadium: Westmarch

29 September 1883	Johnstone Rovers	6–1	Greenock Northern	Johnstone
				Stadium: Newfield Park

==== Ayrshire district ====
Cumnock received a bye to the third round.

29 September 1883	Kilmarnock	3–0	Hurlford	Kilmarnock
	Grier; Wark; McLaughland			Stadium: Rugby Park; Attendance: 1,000

29 September 1883	Kilmarnock Athletic	9–1	Stewarton Cunninghame	Kilmarnock
				Stadium: Holm Quarry

29 September 1883	Lugar Boswell	1–3	Mauchline	Lugar
				Stadium: Rosebank Park

==== Dunbartonshire and Stirlingshire district ====
Vale of Leven received a bye to the third round.

29 September 1883	Renton	6–1	King's Park	Renton
				Stadium: Tontine Park

29 September 1883	Falkirk	9–1	Stenhousemuir	Falkirk
				Stadium: Blinkbonny

29 September 1883	Jamestown	7–1	Dunbritton	Jamestown
				Stadium: Balloch Road

29 September 1883	East Stirlingshire	2–2	Dunipace	Falkirk
				Stadium: Randyford Park

==== Lanarkshire district ====
Hamilton Academical received a bye to the third round.

29 September 1883	Cambuslang	7–0	Tollcross	Cambuslang
				Stadium: Westburn Park

29 September 1883	Royal Albert	8–1	Clarkston	Larkhall
				Stadium: Raploch Park

West Benhar	w/o	Vale of Avon

==== Edinburghshire district ====
St Bernard's received a bye to the third round.

29 September 1883	Newcastleton	1–4	Heart of Midlothian	Newcastleton
			Aitken (x2); Waugh; Douglas	Stadium: Liddel View Park

6 October 1883	Hibernian	10–1	Edina	Edinburgh
	Brogan (x6)			Stadium: Hibernian Park

==== Perthshire and Northern Counties ====
29 September 1883	Dunblane	4–1	Coupar Angus	Dunblane
				Stadium: Kippenross Park

29 September 1883	Strathmore (Dundee)	3–1	Balgay	Dundee
				Stadium: Rollo's Peir

29 September 1883	Dundee Our Boys	2–0	Strathmore (Arbroath)	Dundee
				Stadium: West Craigie Park

Dundee Harp	w/o	Vale of Athole

Perseverance	w/o	Arbroath

==== Southern Counties ====
29 September 1883	Drumlanrig Rangers	2–3	East End Rovers	Thornhill
				Stadium: Tibbers Holm

29 September 1883	Moffat	2–3	5th Kirkcudbrightshire RV	Moffat
				Stadium: Well Village Cricket Field

=== Replay ===
==== Dunbartonshire and Stirlingshire district ====
6 October 1883	Dunipace	1–2	East Stirlingshire	Denny
				Stadium: Broomhill

Notes

1. F-Thornliebank and Bute Rangers mutually agreed to stop the match after 75 minutes.

== Third round ==
=== Matches ===
==== Perthshire and Northern Counties ====
Dunblane received a bye to the fourth round.

20 October 1883	Arbroath	1–1	Dundee Harp	Arbroath
				Stadium: Gayfield Park

20 October 1883	Strathmore (Dundee)	2–2	Dundee Our Boys	Dundee
				Stadium: Rollo's Peir

==== Glasgow, Stirlingshire and Dunbartonshire district ====
Pollokshields Athletic received a bye to the fourth round.

20 October 1883	Partick Thistle	6–0	East Stirlingshire	Partick
				Stadium: Muirpark

20 October 1883	Rangers	5–2	Falkirk	Kinning Park
	Hamilton; McGregor; McHardy; Gossland			Stadium: Kinning Park; Attendance: 2,000

20 October 1883	Jamestown	2–4	Battlefield	Jamestown
				Stadium: Balloch Road

20 October 1883	Cowlairs	0–5	Queen's Park	Glasgow
				Stadium: Gourlay Park

20 October 1883	Vale of Leven	4–1	Renton	Alexandria
				Stadium: North Street Park

==== Edinburgh and Lanarkshire district ====
Edinburgh University and Royal Albert received a bye to the fourth round.

20 October 1883	Heart of Midlothian	1–4	Hibernian	Edinburgh
	Wood		Lee; Brogan; McGhee (x2)	Stadium: Tynecastle Field; Attendance: 6,000

20 October 1883	St Bernard's	7–0	Benhar	Edinburgh
				Stadium: Powderhall

20 October 1883	Cambuslang	6–0	Hamilton Academical	Cambuslang
				Stadium: Westburn Park

==== Southern Counties ====
20 October 1883	East End Rovers	1–6	5th Kirkcudbrightshire RV	Dumfries
				Stadium: Milldamhead

==== Renfrewshire and Ayrshire district ====
20 October 1883	Morton	1–2 (Void)	Kilmarnock Athletic	Greenock
				Stadium: Cappielow

20 October 1883	Olympic	0–5	Mauchline	Paisley
				Stadium: Thistle Park

20 October 1883	Cartvale	4–1	Cumnock	Busby
				Stadium: Cartbridge Park

20 October 1883	Abercorn	7–0	Johnstone Rovers	Paisley
				Stadium: Blackstoun Park

20 October 1883	Arthurlie	3–1	St Mirren	Barrhead
				Stadium: Dunterlie Park

20 October 1883	Thornliebank	1–0 (Void)	Kilmarnock	Thornliebank
				Stadium: Deacon's Bank Park

=== Replays ===
==== Perthshire and Northern Counties ====
27 October 1883	Dundee Harp	2–1	Arbroath	Dundee
				Stadium: Viewforth Park

27 October 1883	Dundee Our Boys	5–1	Strathmore (Dundee)	Dundee
				Stadium: West Craigie Park

==== Renfrewshire and Ayrshire district ====
3 November 1883	Morton	0–4	Kilmarnock Athletic	Greenock
				Stadium: Cappielow

3 November 1883	Thornliebank	2–1	Kilmarnock	Thornliebank
			Higgins	Stadium: Deacon's Bank Park

Notes

1. G-A protest by Morton was upheld and a replay was ordered.
2. H-A protest by Kilmarnock was upheld and a replay was ordered.

== Fourth round ==
Arthurlie received a bye to the fifth round.

=== Matches ===
10 November 1883	5th Kirkcudbrightshire RV	1–8	Hibernian	Dumfries
				Stadium: Palmerston Park

10 November 1883	Cartvale	4–2	Abercorn	Busby
				Stadium: Cartbridge Park

10 November 1883	Dunblane	1–6	Rangers	Dunblane
				Stadium: Kippencross Park

10 November 1883	Kilmarnock Athletic	2–3	Cambuslang	Kilmarnock
				Stadium: Holm Quarry

10 November 1883	Mauchline	4–0	Royal Albert	Mauchline
				Stadium: Connel Park

10 November 1883	Partick Thistle	0–4	Queen's Park	Partick
				Stadium: Muirpark

10 November 1883	Pollokshields Athletic	11–0	Dundee Our Boys	Pollokshields
				Stadium: Pollok Park

10 November 1883	St Bernard's	2–0	Thornliebank	Edinburgh
				Stadium: Powderhall

10 November 1883	Vale of Leven	6–0	Dundee Harp	Alexandria
				Stadium: North Street Park

Battlefield	w/o	Edinburgh University

== Fifth round ==
Battlefield, Cambuslang, Cartvale, Hibernian and Queen's Park received a bye to the quarter-finals.

=== Matches ===
1 December 1883	Arthurlie	0–0	Vale of Leven	Barrhead
				Stadium: Dunterlie Park

1 December 1883	Mauchline	2–3	Pollokshields Athletic	Mauchline
				Stadium: Connel Park

1 December 1883	St Bernard's	0–3	Rangers	Edinburgh
			McHardy; Pringle; Gossland	Stadium: Powderhall; Attendance: 2,000

=== Replay ===
8 December 1883	Vale of Leven	3–1	Arthurlie	Alexandria
				Stadium: North Street Park

== Quarter-finals ==
=== Matches ===
22 December 1883	Cambuslang	1–5	Rangers	Cambuslang
			Inglis; Heggie; Pringle; Gossland (x2)	Stadium: Westburn Park

22 December 1883	Hibernian	6–1	Battlefield	Edinburgh
				Stadium: Hibernian Park; Attendance: 1,200

22 December 1883	Queen's Park	6–1	Cartvale	Pollokshields
				Stadium: Titwood

22 December 1883	Vale of Leven	4–2	Pollokshields Athletic	Alexandria
				Stadium: North Street Park

== Semi-finals ==
=== Matches ===
19 January 1884	Vale of Leven	3–0	Rangers	Alexandria
				Stadium: North Street Park; Attendance: 7,000

2 February 1884	Hibernian	1–5	Queen's Park	Edinburgh
				Stadium: Hibernian Park; Attendance: 8,500

== Final ==
23 March 1884

Queen's Park	w/o	Vale of Leven

Vale of Leven did not appear for the final in protest after a request made on the Wednesday before the match was due to take place for a postponement due to bereavement, illness and injury had been refused by the Scottish FA.

== See also ==
- 1883–84 in Scottish football
