= 1883–84 Morton F.C. season =

Morton
1883–84 season
- Scottish Cup: Third round (lost to Kilmarnock Athletic)

The 1882–83 season was Morton Football Club's seventh season in which they competed at a national level, entering the Scottish Cup.

== Fixtures and results ==
Win Draw Loss Postponed

=== Scottish Cup ===
8 September 1883 First round	Morton	1 – 0	Renfrew	Cappielow Park
	Goal

29 September 1883 Second round	Morton	bye

20 October 1883 Third round	Morton	1 – 2 ^{[note 1]}	Kilmarnock Athletic	Cappielow Park
	Goal		,

3 November 1883 Third round	Morton	0 – 4	Kilmarnock Athletic	Cappielow Park
			,,,

1. Morton v Kilmarnock Athletic result was declared void.

=== Renfrewshire Cup ===
6 October 1883 First round	Woodland	1 – 4	Morton
	Goal		Allan; Reid; Gillespie

1 December 1883 Second round	Morton	2 – 2	Cartvale	Cappielow Park
	Nugent; Reid		,	Attendance: 1000

8 December 1883 Second Round Replay	Cartvale	8 – 3	Morton	Cartbridge Park
	Wyllie; McNee; McFall; Calderwood; Adams,		Roberts; Gillespie; Nugent

=== Friendlies ===
1 September 1883 Friendly	Morton	10 – 2	Airdrieonians	Cappielow Park
	,,,,,,,,,		,

22 September 1883 Friendly	Morton	7 – 5	Pollokshields Athletic	Cappielow Park
	,,,,,,		,,,,

29 September 1883 Friendly	Morton	5 – 1	Rangers Swifts	Cappielow Park
	,,,,		Goal

13 October 1883 Friendly	Morton	5 – 2	Partick Thistle	Cappielow Park
	McKinnon; Reid,, Gillespie		,

27 October 1883 Friendly	Morton	2 – 0	Johnstone	Cappielow Park
	,

17 November 1883 Friendly	Clyde	1 – 3	Morton	Barrowfield Park
	Goal		Barrie; Nugent; Kilgour

24 November 1883 Friendly	Morton	1 – 3	Renton	Cappielow Park
	Goal		,,

15 December 1883 Friendly	Morton	2 – 1	Port Glasgow Athletic	Cappielow Park
	Barrie; Nugent		Goal	Attendance: 3000

5 January 1884 Friendly	^{[note 2]}Paisley Athletic	–	Morton	East Park

12 January 1884 Friendly	Morton	7 – 3	Greenock Southern	Cappielow Park
	Aitken, ?,, Nugent; Ramsay		,,

19 January 1884 Friendly	Cowlairs	2 – 2	Morton	Gourlay Park
	,		Aitken,

2 February 1884 Friendly	Vale of Leven	0 – 1	Morton
			Fleming

9 February 1884 Friendly	Morton	5 – 3	Third Lanark	Cappielow Park
	Fleming,,, Barrie		,,

8 March 1884 Friendly	St. Mirren	3 – 2	Morton	Westmarch
	Gilmour; Brown		,

15 March 1884 Friendly	Johnstone	4 – 3	Morton	Cartbank Park
	,,,		,,

29 March 1884 Friendly	Morton	–	Thistle^{[note 3]}	Cappielow Park

5 April 1884 Friendly	Morton	4 – 5	Greenock Northern	Cappielow Park
	? Nugent; Aitken,		?, Neill, Barr

12 April 1884 Friendly	Partick Thistle	4 – 1	Morton
	,,,		Goal

19 April 1884 Friendly	Port Glasgow Athletic	5 – 2	Morton	Clune Park
	Hannah; McErrol, og Hunter		Gillespie; Barrie	Attendance: 6000

26 April 1884 Friendly	Renton	4 – 0	Morton
	,,,

2. Paisley Athletic did not turn up.
3. Thistle could not appear and sent a telegram, which Morton did not receive until near kick-off.
