= Lyle Athletic F.C. =

Former association football club in Scotland

Lyle Athletic
- Full name: Lyle Athletic F.C.
- Founded: 1880
- Dissolved: 1889
- Ground: Bogston Park
- Hon. Secretary: Robert Sheddon, Martin Dowling
- Match Secretary: George Cameron, William Barclay
Ladyburn colours	Lyle Athletic colours

Lyle Athletic Football Club was a Scottish football team located in the town of Greenock, Renfrewshire.

== Ladyburn ==
The club was founded in January 1880 under the name Ladyburn, after the park where the club played. It entered the Scottish Cup in 1881–82 and 1882–83, but suffered heavy first round defeats both times; at half-time in its 1881–82 tie with Kilbarchan, Ladyburn was 2–1 down, but conceded six goals in the second half without replying. In 1882–83 it lost even more heavily, 10–1 at Abercorn.

It also entered the Renfrewshire Cup for the only time in 1881–82, losing 4–2 at Sir John Maxwell in the only tie it played, the Sir John holding Ladyburn to 2–1 when playing against the wind, and scoring 3 without reply when with it.

== Lyle Athletic ==
After the defeat to Abercorn, the club was re-founded as Lyle Athletic, named in honour of Abram Lyle, albeit without a number of players, who had decamped to Morton. Its first match under its new name was a 7–3 win over Aldergrove at Ladyburn Park; the club reached the semi-final of the Greenock and District Cup that season.

It entered the Scottish Cup in 1883–84 and 1884–85, but again lost in the first round both times, the first time 4–2 at home to Johnstone Rovers and the second time 9–1 at Johnstone.

The club was always one of the smallest in the shire; even in 1884 it only had 30 members. That year, in Greenock alone, the senior clubs included Rangers, Greenock Rovers, Southern, Northern, Morton, and the 1st R.R.V.; the Athletic was easily the smallest senior club in town. At the end of the 1884–85 season it therefore did not renew its subscription to the Scottish Football Association and continued as a junior club.

Ironically, as a junior club, Athletic gained its one win in the county competition; in the 1886–87 Renfrewshire Cup the club beat Barrhead Victoria 3–1 in the first round, played at Port Glasgow Athletic due to the loss of Bogston. In the second the club turned up late at Neilston, having missed the Port Glasgow train. It scratched from the fixture, but played a 40-minute friendly out instead, which Neilston won. The club's final match appears to have been at the start of 1889, but the name was revived for a "fast-rising" team in 1892.

== Colours ==
As Ladyburn, the club originally wore blue jerseys and white knickers, but changed to white jerseys and knickers with a red Maltese cross in 1882. As Lyle Athletic, the club wore white jerseys and blue knickers with a white stripe.

== Ground ==
The club's first ground was Ladyburn Park, close to Bogston railway station. From 1882 it played at Bogston Park, shared with Northern (Greenock). It lost the ground thanks to railway operations, and had to find a new one "further east", although in 1886 it once more used Ladyburn Park thanks to new tenants Rangers.
