= 1885–86 Morton F.C. season =

Morton
1885–86 season
- Scottish Cup: First round (lost to Cartvale)

The 1885–86 season was Morton Football Club's ninth season in which they competed at a national level, entering the Scottish Cup.

== Fixtures and results ==
Win Draw Loss Postponed

=== Scottish Cup ===
12 September 1885 First Round	Cartvale	2–1	Morton	Cartbridge Park
	? Maitland		Campbell

=== Renfrewshire Cup ===
31 October 1885 First Round	Morton	7–0	Woodvale	Cappielow Park
	James Coates, Fleming ? Gray; John Coates ?

21 November 1885 Second Round	Morton	14–1	Greenock Southern	Cappielow Park
	,,,,,,,,,,,,		Goal

19 December 1885 Third Round	Morton	5–2	Johnstone	Cappielow Park
	Fleming, Mills; Nugent,		,

20 February 1886 Semi Final	Abercorn	6–5	Morton	Blackstoun Park
	Allison, Johnstone,,		Nugent; Joyce, Barrie; James Coates	Attendance: 4000; Referee: Mr Brown (Queen's Park)

=== Friendlies ===
6 March 1886 Friendly	Morton	2–2	Hibernian	Cappielow Park
	Fleming; James Coates		,

24 April 1886 Friendly	Morton	4–1	London Caledonians	Cappielow Park
	James Coates,,		og
