= 1884–85 Scottish Cup =

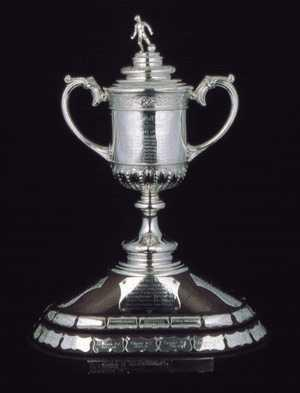
- The Scottish Cup trophy

Tournament details
- Country: Scotland
- Teams: 132

Final positions
- Champions: Renton (first title)
- Runners-up: Vale of Leven

Tournament statistics
- Matches played: 147
- Goals scored: 821 (5.59 per match)

The 1884–85 Scottish Cup – officially the Scottish Football Association Challenge Cup – was the 12th season of Scotland's most prestigious football knockout competition. Renton won the competition for the first tie after they defeated Vale of Leven in a replayed final.

Defending champions Queen's Park lost to Battlefield in the third round.

== Calendar ==
Round	First match date	Fixtures			Clubs
Round	First match date	Original	Byes	Replays	Clubs
First Round	13 September 1884	63	4	7	130 → 68
Second Round	4 October 1884	31	6	7	68 → 39
Third Round	25 October 1884	19	1	3	39 → 20
Fourth Round	15 November 1884	10	0	3	20 → 11
Fifth Round	6 December 1884	3	5	0	11 → 8
Quarter-finals	27 December 1884	4	0	0	8 → 4
Semi-finals	24 January 1885	2	0	1	4 → 2
Final	21 February 1885	1	0	1	2 → 1

- Two teams qualified for the second round after drawing their first round replay.
- Four teams qualified for the third round after drawing their second round replay.
- Two teams qualified for the fifth round after drawing their fourth round replay.

== Teams ==
All 130 teams entered the competition in the first round.

Ayrshire	Dunbartonshire	Glasgow and District	Lanarkshire	Renfrewshire
Annbank; Ayr; Cumnock; Dalry; Hurlford; Kilmarnock; Kilmarnock Athletic; Lugar Boswell; Mauchline; Maybole; Stewarton Cunninghame	Albion; Dumbarton; Dumbarton Athletic; Dunbritton; Jamestown; Lenzie; Levendale; Renton; Rock; Vale of Leven; Vale of Leven Wanderers; Yoker	Battlefield; Clyde; Cowlairs; Cyrus; Dean Park; Eastern Athletic; Granton; Glasgow United YMCA; Kinning Park Athletic; Northern (Glasgow); Orchard; Partick; Partick Thistle; Pilgrims; Pollokshields; Pollokshields Athletic; Possilpark; Queen's Park; Rangers; Shawlands; Springburn Hibernian; Thistle; Whitefield; Whitehill; 3rd Lanark RV	Airdrie; Airdriehill; Airdrieonians; Albion Rovers; Cambuslang; Chryston; Clarkston; Drumpellier; Dykehead; Glengowan; Hamilton Academical; Royal Albert; Shettleston; Tollcross; Vale of Avon; West Benhar; Westburn; Wishaw Swifts	Abercorn; Arthurlie; Cartvale; Clippens; Greenock Rangers; Greenock Rovers; Johnstone; Johnstone Rovers; Kilbarchan; Lyle Athletic; Morton; Neilston; Northern (Greenock); Olympic; Paisley Athletic; Pollokshaws; Port Glasgow Athletic; Renfrew; Southern; St Mirren; Thornliebank; 1st Renfrew RV
Edinburghshire	Northern Counties	Perthshire	Stirlingshire	Southern Counties
Bo'ness; Dunfermline; Edina; Heart of Midlothian; Hibernian; Newcastleton; Norton Park; St Bernard's; West Calder	Aberdeen; Angus; Arbroath; Coupar Angus; Dundee East End; Dundee Harp; Dundee Our Boys; Dundee West End; Lindertis; Perseverance; Strathmore (Arbroath); Strathmore (Dundee)	Breadalbane; Crieff Juniors; Dunblane; Vale of Teith	Alloa Athletic; Campsie; Campsie Central; Dunipace; East Stirlingshire; Falkirk; Grasshoppers; King's Park; Stenhousemuir; Strathblane; Tayavalla	Moffat; Queen of the South Wanderers; Thornhill; Vale of Nith; Volunteer Athletic; 5th Kirkcudbrightshire RV

== First round ==
=== Matches ===
==== Glasgow and District ====
Dean Park received a bye to the second round.

13 September 1884	Whitefield	3–3	Thistle	Govan
				Stadium: Whitefield Park

13 September 1884	Possilpark	7–0	Cyrus	Possilpark
				Stadium: Saracen Park

13 September 1884	Northern (Glasgow)	6–4	Glasgow University YMCA	Glasgow
				Stadium: Hyde Park

13 September 1884	Clyde	1–2	Cowlairs	Glasgow
				Stadium: Barrowfield Park

13 September 1884	3rd Lanark RV	3–2	Partick Thistle	Crosshill
				Stadium: Cathkin Park

13 September 1884	Partick	9–1	Eastern Athletic	Partick
				Stadium: Inchview

13 September 1884	Shawlands	0–1	Granton	Pollokshaws
				Stadium: Norwood Park

13 September 1884	Queen's Park	4–0	Pollokshields	Govan
				Stadium: Copeland Park

13 September 1884	Pollokshields Athletic	6–2	Pilgrims	Pollokshields
				Stadium: Pollok Park

13 September 1884	Battlefield	8–0	Kinning Park Athletic	Langside
				Stadium: Mossfield Park

13 September 1884	Rangers	11–0	Whitehill	Kinning Park
				Stadium: Kinning Park

Orchard	w/o	Springburn Hibernian

==== Renfrewshire district ====
13 September 1884	Renfrew	1–0	Johnstone Rovers	Renfrew
				Stadium: Glebe Park

13 September 1884	Clippens	3–1	Greenock Rovers	Linwood
				Stadium: Moss Park

13 September 1884	Arthurlie	2–0	Olympic	Barrhead
				Stadium: Dunterlie Park

13 September 1884	St Mirren	4–3 (Void)	Neilston	Paisley
				Stadium: Westmarch

13 September 1884	Thornliebank	6–0	Northern (Greenock)	Thornliebank
				Stadium: Deacon's Bank Park

13 September 1884	Morton	2–2	Abercorn	Greenock
				Stadium: Cappielow

13 September 1884	Cartvale	12–1	Greenock Rangers	Busby
				Stadium: Cartbridge Park

13 September 1884	Paisley Athletic	2–3	Southern	Paisley
				Stadium: East Park

13 September 1884	Port Glasgow Athletic	6–1	1st Renfrew RV	Port Glasgow
	McCartney (x2); Stewart; McMinn (x2)			Stadium: Clune Park

13 September 1884	Johnstone	9–1	Lyle Athletic	Johnstone
				Stadium: Cartbank Park

Kilbarchan	w/o	Pollokshaws

==== Ayrshire district ====
Maybole received a bye to the second round.

13 September 1884	Cumnock	3–2	Mauchline	Cumnock
				Stadium: New Station Field

13 September 1884	Dalry	3–7	Annbank	Dalry
				Stadium: Bleezepark

13 September 1884	Ayr	4–1	Lugar Boswell	Ayr
				Stadium: Beresford Park

20 September 1884	Kilmarnock Athletic	14–0	Stewarton Cunninghame	Kilmarnock
				Stadium: Holm Quarry

20 September 1884	Kilmarnock	6–1 (Void)	Hurlford	Kilmarnock
				Stadium: Rugby Park

==== Dunbartonshire district ====
13 September 1884	Renton	2–1	Vale of Leven Wanderers	Renton
				Stadium: Tontine Park

13 September 1884	Jamestown	1–1	Vale of Leven	Jamestown
				Stadium: Balloch Road

13 September 1884	Dumbarton Rock	0–2	Yoker	Dumbarton

Lenzie	w/o	Dumbarton Athletic

Dumbarton	w/o	Levendale

Albion	w/o	Dunbritton

==== Lanarkshire district ====
13 September 1884	Clarkston	1–4	Hamilton Academical	Airdrie
				Stadium: Blackrigg Farm Park

13 September 1884	Airdrie	4–6	Shettleston	Airdrie
				Stadium: Smith's Field

13 September 1884	Tollcross	2–6	Westburn	Glasgow
				Stadium: Main's Park

13 September 1884	Royal Albert	1–4	Cambuslang	Larkhall
				Stadium: Raploch Park

13 September 1884	Drumpellier	0–6	Airdrieonians	Coatbridge
				Stadium: Blair Lodge Park

13 September 1884	Wishaw Swifts	2–1 (Void)	Dykehead	Wishaw
				Stadium: Academy Park

13 September 1884	Albion Rovers	1–2	Glengowan	Coatbridge
				Stadium: Meadow Park

20 September 1884	Chryston	1–8	West Benhar	Chryston
				Stadium: Millbrae Park

Airdriehill	w/o	Vale of Avon

==== Stirlingshire district ====
Campsie Central received a bye to the second round.

13 September 1884	Stenhousemuir	1–2	Tayavalla	Stenhousemuir
				Stadium: South Broomage

13 September 1884	Grasshoppers	4–0	Dunipace	Bonnybridge
				Stadium: Peathill Park

13 September 1884	Alloa Athletic	0–4	King's Park	Alloa
				Stadium: Gaberston Park

13 September 1884	East Stirlingshire	4–2	Campsie	Falkirk
				Stadium: Randyford Park

Falkirk	w/o	Strathblane

==== Edinburghshire district ====
Heart of Midlothian received a bye to the second round.

13 September 1884	Bo'ness	0–2	Hibernian	Bo'ness
				Stadium: Bo'ness Football Park

13 September 1884	Dunfermline	10–2	Newcastleton	Dunfermline
				Stadium: Ladysmill

13 September 1884	St Bernard's	6–0	Edina	Edinburgh
				Stadium: Powderhall

13 September 1884	West Calder	3–0	Norton Park	West Calder
				Stadium: Burngrange Park

==== Perthshire district ====
13 September 1884	Dunblane	8–0	Crieff Juniors	Dunblane
				Stadium: Kippenross Park

Breadalbane	w/o	Vale of Teith

==== Northern Counties ====
13 September 1884	Lindertis	1–4	Aberdeen	Kirriemuir
				Stadium: Knowehead

13 September 1884	Angus	1–5	Strathmore (Dundee)	Forfar
				Stadium: Station Park

13 September 1884	Strathmore (Arbroath)	1–4	Dundee Our Boys	Arbroath
				Stadium: Damley Park

13 September 1884	Arbroath	3–2	Dundee Harp	Arbroath
				Stadium: Gayfield Park

13 September 1884	Dundee East End	8–1	Coupar Angus	Dundee
				Stadium: Rollo's Pier

Dundee West End	w/o	Perseverance

==== Southern Counties ====
13 September 1884	Thornhill	0–13	Queen of the South Wnaderers	Thornhill
				Stadium: Tibbers Holm

13 September 1884	Moffat	2–5	5th Kirkcudbrightshire RV	Moffat
				Stadium: Ballplay Road

13 September 1884	Volunteer Athletic	1–4	Vale of Nith	Newton Stewart
				Stadium: Holm Park

=== Replays ===
==== Glasgow and District ====
20 September 1884	Thistle	3–1	Whitefield	Glasgow
				Stadium: Beechwood Park

==== Renfrewshire district ====
27 September 1884	Neilston	1–4	St Mirren	Neilston
				Stadium: Nether Kirton Park

20 September 1884	Abercorn	3–4 (Void)	Morton	Paisley
				Stadium: Blackstoun Park

==== Ayrshire district ====
27 September 1884	Hurlford	3–1	Kilmarnock	Hurlford
				Stadium: Drumbiehill Park

==== Dunbartonshire district ====
20 September 1884	Vale of Leven	4–1	Jamestown	Alexandria
				Stadium: North Street Park

==== Lanarkshire district ====
27 September 1884	Dykehead	2–5	Wishaw Swifts	Shotts
				Stadium: Private Park

=== Second replay ===
==== Renfrewshire district ====
27 September 1884	Abercorn	2–2	Morton	Paisley
				Stadium: Blackstoun Park

Notes

1. A-A protest by Neilston was upheld and a replay was ordered.
2. B-A protest by Hurlford was upheld and a replay was ordered.
3. C-A protest by Dykehead was upheld and a replay was ordered.
4. D-A protest by Abercorn was upheld and a replay was ordered.
5. E-Hurlford were disqualified and Kilmarnock re-instated.
6. F-Both teams qualified for the second round.

== Second round ==
=== Matches ===
==== Glasgow and District ====
Partick received a bye to the third round.

4 October 1884	Dean Park	2–0	Springburn Hibernian	Govan
				Stadium: Woodville Park

4 October 1884	Cowlairs	1–2	Pollokshields Athletic	Glasgow
				Stadium: Gourlay Park

4 October 1884	3rd Lanark RV	2–2	Rangers	Crosshill
			Morton; Gossland	Stadium: Cathkin Park; Attendance: 6,000

4 October 1884	Possilpark	0–3	Battlefield	Possilpark
				Stadium: Saracen Park

4 October 1884	Granton	1–3	Northern (Glasgow)	Govan
				Stadium: Norwood Park

4 October 1884	Thistle	1–4	Queen's Park	Glasgow
				Stadium: Beechwood Park

==== Renfrewshire district ====
Cartvale and Morton received a bye to the third round.

4 October 1884	Arthurlie	1–0	Abercorn	Barrhead
				Stadium: Dunterlie Park

4 October 1884	Southern	2–2	Pollokshaws	Greenock
				Stadium: Berrylands Park

4 October 1884	Thornliebank	1–0	Port Glasgow Athletic	Thornliebank
				Stadium: Deacon's Bank Park

4 October 1884	Clippens	1–7	Renfrew	Linwood
				Stadium: Moss Park

4 October 1884	St Mirren	3–0	Johnstone	Paisley
				Stadium: Westmarch

==== Ayrshire district ====
4 October 1884	Maybole	1–4	Kilmarnock Athletic	Maybole
				Stadium: Gardenrose Farm

4 October 1884	Annbank	4–1	Kilmarnock	Annbank
				Stadium: Pebble Park

4 October 1884	Ayr	5–0	Cumnock	Ayr
				Stadium: Beresford Park

==== Dunbartonshire and Stirlingshire district ====
4 October 1884	Vale of Leven	14–0	Campsie Central	Alexandria
				Stadium: North Street Park

4 October 1884	Yoker	17–0	Tayavalla	Yoker
				Stadium: Holm Park

4 October 1884	Dumbarton Athletic	3–1	King's Park	Dumbarton
				Stadium: Burnside Park

4 October 1884	East Stirlingshire	2–10	Renton	Falkirk
				Stadium: Randyford Park

4 October 1884	Dumbarton	2–0	Albion	Dumbarton
	Hutton			Stadium: Boghead Park

4 October 1884	Grasshoppers	1–4	Falkirk	Bonnybridge
				Stadium: Peathill Park

==== Lanarkshire district ====
Hamilton Academical received a bye to the third round.

4 October 1884	West Benhar	9–1 (Void)	Shettleston	Harthill
				Stadium: Harthill Mains

4 October 1884	Airdrieonians	2–2	Cambuslang	Airdrie
				Stadium: Mavisbank Park

4 October 1884	Glengowan	4–1	Westburn	Caldercruix
				Stadium: Little Dumbreck

4 October 1884	Wishaw Swifts	8–3	Airdriehill	Wishaw
				Stadium: Academy Park

==== Edinburghshire and Perthshire district ====
St Bernard's received a bye to the third round.

4 October 1884	Dunfermline	1–11	Heart of Midlothian	Dunfermline
				Stadium: Ladysmill Park

4 October 1884	Hibernian	5–1	Vale of Teith	Edinburgh
				Stadium: Hibernian Park

4 October 1884	West Calder	0–1	Dunblane	West Calder
				Stadium: Burngrange Park

==== Northern Counties ====
4 October 1884	Dundee Our Boys	8–1	Dundee West End	Dundee
				Stadium: West Craigie Park

4 October 1884	Strathmore (Dundee)	1–1	Dundee East End	Dundee
				Stadium: Rollo's Pier

4 October 1884	Aberdeen	1–7	Arbroath	Aberdeen
				Stadium: Holburn Cricket Ground

==== Southern Counties ====
Vale of Nith received a bye to the third round.

4 October 1884	5th Kirkcudbrightshire RV	3–4	Queen of the South Wanderers	Dumfries
				Stadium: Palmerston Park

=== Replays ===
==== Glasgow and District ====
11 October 1884	Rangers	0–0	3rd Lanark RV	Kinning Park
				Stadium: Kinning Park; Attendance: 7,000

==== Renfrewshire district ====
11 October 1884	Pollokshaws	3–3	Southern	Pollokshaws
				Stadium: Broom Park

18 October 1884	Port Glasgow Athletic	2–2	Thornliebank	Port Glasgow
	Graham; McKerrol			Stadium: Clune Park

==== Lanarkshire District ====
11 October 1884	Cambuslang	10–2	Airdrieonians	Cambuslang
				Stadium: Westburn Park

18 October 1884	West Benhar	4–1	Shettleston	Airdrie

==== Northern Counties ====
11 October 1884	Dundee East End	2–5	Strathmore (Dundee)	Dundee
				Stadium: Madeira Park

=== Second replay ===
==== Renfrewshire district ====
25 October 1884	Thornliebank	2–1	Port Glasgow Athletic	Thornliebank
			Brown	Stadium: Deacon's Bank Park

Notes

1. G-A protest by Port Glasgow Athletic was upheld and a replay was ordered.
2. H-A protest by Shettleston was upheld and a replay was ordered.
3. I-Heart of Midlothian were disqualified and Dunfermline re-instated.
4. J-Both teams qualified for the third round.
5. K-Played at a neutral venue.

== Third round ==
=== Matches ===
==== Glasgow, Dunbartonshire and Stirlingshire district ====
25 October 1884	Pollokshields Athletic	4–1	Dumbarton	Pollokshields
	Shaw (x2); Own goal			Stadium: Pollok Park; Referee: A. Stuart

25 October 1884	Renton	9–2	Northern (Glasgow)	Renton
				Stadium: Tontine Park

25 October 1884	Dean Park	2–2	Dumbarton Athletic	Govan
				Stadium: Copeland Park

25 October 1884	Vale of Leven	4–1	Yoker	Alexandria
				Stadium: North Street Park

25 October 1884	3rd Lanark RV	0–3	Rangers	Glasgow
			Morton; Cook; Lawrie	Stadium: Cathkin Park; Attendance: 4,000

25 October 1884	Queen's Park	2–3	Battlefield	Crosshill
				Stadium: Hampden Park

25 October 1884	Partick	4–2	Falkirk	Partick
				Stadium: Inchview

==== Renfrewshire and Ayrshire district ====
Annbank received a bye to the fourth round.

25 October 1884	Morton	5–0	Southern	Greenock
				Stadium: Cappielow

25 October 1884	Arthurlie	3–0	Cartvale	Barrhead
				Stadium: Dunterlie Park

25 October 1884	St Mirren	1–0 (Void)	Renfrew	Paisley
				Stadium: Westmarch

25 October 1884	Ayr	4–2	Kilmarnock Athletic	Ayr
				Stadium: Beresford Park

1 November 1884	Thornliebank	4–0	Pollokshaws	Thornliebank
				Stadium: Deacon's Bank Park

==== Edinburghshire and Lanarkshire district ====
25 October 1884	Hibernian	5–1	Glengowan	Edinburgh
				Stadium: Hibernian Park

25 October 1884	West Benhar	5–1	St Bernard's	Harthill
				Stadium: Harthill Mains

25 October 1884	Cambuslang	3–0	Hamilton Academical	Cambuslang
				Stadium: Westburn Park

1 November 1884	Wishaw Swifts	7–1	Dunfermline	Wishaw
				Stadium: Academy Park

==== Forfarshire and Perthshire district ====
25 October 1884	Dunblane	2–4	Arbroath	Dunblane
				Stadium: Kippencross Park

25 October 1884	Dundee Our Boys	5–1	Strathmore (Dundee)	Dundee
				Stadium: West Craigie Park

==== Southern Counties ====
25 October 1884	Vale of Nith	0–6	Queen of the South Wanderers	Dumfries
				Stadium: Milldamhead Park

=== Replays ===
==== Glasgow, Dunbartonshire and Stirlingshire district ====
1 November 1884	Dean Park	0–3	Dumbarton Athletic	Govan
				Stadium: Woodville Park

==== Renfrewshire and Ayrshire district ====
8 November 1884	St Mirren	3–0 (Void)	Renfrew	Paisley
				Stadium: Westmarch

=== Second replay ===
==== Renfrewshire and Ayrshire district ====
13 November 1884	St Mirren	6–3	Renfrew	Paisley
				Stadium: Westmarch

Notes

1. L-A protest by Dean Park over a registration irregularity was upheld and a replay was ordered.
2. M-A protest by Renfrew was upheld and a replay was ordered.
3. N-Match abandoned after 45 minutes. A protest by Renfrew was upheld and a replay was ordered.

== Fourth round ==
=== Matches ===
15 November 1884	Hibernian	5–1	Ayr	Edinburgh
				Stadium: Hibernian Park

15 November 1884	Pollokshields Athletic	0–3	Battlefield	Pollokshields
				Stadium: Pollok Park

15 November 1884	Dundee Our Boys	2–2	West Benhar	Dundee
				Stadium: West Craigie Park

15 November 1884	Annbank	5–2	Queen of the South Wanderers	Annbank
				Stadium: Pebble Park

15 November 1884	Arbroath	4–3 (Void)	Rangers	Arbroath
			Morton 10'; McKenzie 20'; Gossland	Stadium: Gayfield Park; Attendance: 4,000

15 November 1884	Wishaw Swifts	1–2	Morton	Wishaw
				Stadium: Academy Park

15 November 1884	Cambuslang	2–2	Thornliebank	Cambuslang
				Stadium: Westburn Park

15 November 1884	Dumbarton Athletic	6–3	Partick	Dumbarton
				Stadium: St James' Park

15 November 1884	Arthurlie	1–2	Vale of Leven	Barrhead
				Stadium: Dunterlie Park

15 November 1884	Renton	2–1	St Mirren	Renton
				Stadium: Tontine Park

=== Replays ===
22 November 1884	West Benhar	8–3	Dundee Our Boys	Harthill
				Stadium: Harthill Mains

22 November 1884	Thornliebank	0–0	Cambuslang	Thornliebank
				Stadium: Deacon's Bank Park

20 December 1884	Arbroath	1–8	Rangers	Arbroath
				Stadium: Gayfield Park; Attendance: 2,000

Notes

1. O-A protest by Rangers about the size of the pitch was initially dismissed but later upheld and a replay was ordered.
2. P-Both teams qualified for the fifth round.

== Fifth round ==
Battlefield, Renton, Thornliebank, Vale of Leven and the winners of the replayed Arbroath vs Rangers tie received a bye to the quarter-finals.

=== Matches ===
6 December 1884	Dumbarton Athletic	1–4	Cambuslang	Dumbarton
				Stadium: St James' Park

6 December 1884	Annbank	5–1	West Benhar	Annbank
				Stadium: Pebble Park

6 December 1884	Hibernian	4–0	Morton	Edinburgh
	McGhee; McGrail; Clarke			Stadium: Hibernian Park

== Quarter-finals ==
=== Matches ===
27 December 1884	Battlefield	Not played	Cambuslang	Kinning Park
				Stadium: Kinning Park

27 December 1884	Hibernian	5–0	Annbank	Edinburgh
	Cox; Lee (x2); McGhee; Clarke			Stadium: Hibernian Park

27 December 1884	Renton	5–3	Rangers	Renton
			McKenzie; Peacock; Gossland	Stadium: Tontine Park; Attendance: 4,000

27 December 1884	Thornliebank	3–4	Vale of Leven	Thornliebank
				Stadium: Deacon's Bank Park

=== Replay ===
10 January 1885	Cambuslang	3–1	Battlefield	Cambuslang
				Stadium: Westburn Park

Notes

1. Q-Battlefield did not appear and Cambuslang claimed the tie. However, a replay was ordered to be played and Battlefield would lose home advantage.

== Semi-finals ==
=== Matches ===
24 January 1885	Hibernian	2–3	Renton	Edinburgh
	McGinn; McGhee			Stadium: Hibernian Park; Attendance: 7,000

31 January 1885	Vale of Leven	0–0	Cambuslang	Alexandria
				Stadium: North Street Park

=== Replay ===
7 February 1885	Cambuslang	1–3	Vale of Leven	Cambuslang
				Stadium: Westburn Park

== Final ==
21 February 1885
15:00

Renton	0–0	Vale of Leven
	Report

Hampden Park, Crosshill
Attendance: 3,000

=== Replay ===
28 February 1885
15:00

Renton	3–1	Vale of Leven
A. McCall; A. McIntyre (x2)	Report

Hampden Park, Crosshill
Attendance: 5,000
