= Linwood F.C. =

Former association football club in Scotland

Linwood
- Full name: Linwood F.C.
- Founded: 1882
- Dissolved: 1884
- Ground: Craig Park
- Match secretary: William Graham
- Hon. Secretary: James McKinstry
Home colours

Linwood Football Club was a Scottish football team from the town of Linwood, Renfrewshire.

== History ==
The club was founded in 1882, at the same time as the Clippens club in the same town. The club won 6 out of 8 matches in its first half-season. One of the defeats was at Johnstone Rovers in the Johnstone & District Cup - the club's first competitive match.

Whereas Clippens joined the Scottish Football Association almost immediately, Linwood waited until 1883 to do so. Although Linwood joined the association in time to play in the 1883–84 Scottish Cup, it was too late to play in the first round of the Renfrewshire Cup. However, the club was allowed to join the county competition in the second round, where it lost 5–1 at Paisley Athletic. By the time the tie was played, Linwood was already out of the Scottish Cup, having lost 4–1 against another Paisley side, Woodland.

The last appearance of the club was a losing effort in the 4-a-side tournament at the Johnstone F.C. athletic games in June 1884. Before the 1884–85 season, Linwood was taken over by Clippens. Clippens did not survive the season, and in February 1886 there was an attempt to revive the Linwood club, although the attempt did not take hold.

== Colours ==
The club played in all white - the same outfit as Clippens.

== Ground ==
The club's ground was Craig Park, 1 mile from Elderslie railway station.
