= Lochwinnoch F.C. =

Former association football club in Scotland

Lochwinnoch
- Full name: Lochwinnoch F.C.
- Nickname(s): the Curlers
- Founded: 1881
- Dissolved: 1899
- Ground: Field Park
1889–96 colours

Lochwinnoch Football Club was a 19th-century Scottish football team located in the village of Lochwinnoch, Renfrewshire.

== History ==
The club was founded in 1881, its first recorded match being a 1–1 draw with Kilbarchan in November that year.

Lochwinnoch entered the Scottish Cup from 1882–83 to 1898–99, other than in 1884–85 and 1885–86, but only ever won one tie in the main rounds; 5–1 against Pollokshaws in 1887–88. After 1891–92, when the Scottish Football Association introduced qualifying rounds and (from the 1895–96 season) the Scottish Qualifying Cup, the club only ever won one further tie, 5–2 against Bridge of Weir in 1896–97.

The club's lack of success in the national competition was mirrored in the county competition, its appearances in the Renfrewshire Cup normally ending with a heavy defeat. Lochwinnoch's best performance came in 1888–89, beating Johnstone Rangers 2–1 away in the first round, drawing a bye in the second, and only losing to Morton 4–2 in the third. It was a significant improvement, given the club had lost 12–0 to Morton in the first round in 1886, but it could not be sustained as professionalism in the game grew.

However, the club did have success at district level, winning the Johnstone & District Cup in its first entry in 1887–88. Lochwinnoch beat Johnstone Harp 1–0 in the final, thanks to a superior passing game. The club also won the Charity Cup - a trophy donated by the Johnstone Rangers club for clubs in Johnstone - the same year.

The last record of the club is of its withdrawal from the 1898–99 Scottish Qualifying Cup, having been drawn to face Thornliebank.

== Colours ==
The club is known to have worn the following colours:

Colours
Years	Jersey	Shorts
1883–84	White	White
1886–87	Navy	White
1887–89	Scarlet	White
1889–96	Red	Blue
1896–99	White	Navy

== Ground ==
The club played at Field Park.
