= Mearns Athletic F.C. =

Former association football club in Scotland

Mearns Athletic
- Full name: Mearns Athletic F.C.
- Nickname: the Athletics
- Founded: 1883
- Dissolved: 1889
- Ground: Croft Park
- Hon. Secretary: David Craig
- Match Secretary: A. C. Vallance
Home colours

Mearns Athletic F.C. was an association football club from Newton Mearns in Renfrewshire, active in the 1880s.

== History ==
The club was formed in 1883; its first match was at home to Thornliebank in December, and, although it was a 6–2 defeat to a strong side, "for their first match they played very well". Its introduction to competitive football was remarkable; its first tie in the Renfrewshire Cup, in the first round of 1884–85, was the club's biggest win - a 13–0 drubbing of the senior Glenpatrick side. Reality bit in the second round, the Athletic losing 12–0 at home to Port Glasgow Athletic, the Port men apparently roused by the Athletic's refusal to switch the tie to Clune Park.

The club had one season of senior football, joining the Scottish Football Association in August 1885 and being struck off 12 months later. In that time it played one Scottish Cup tie, a 3–2 defeat at Woodvale in the first round in 1885–86.

The Athletic continued playing outside the Scottish FA for a few years afterwards, recording another big win (7–0 over Busby) in the 1887–88 Renfrewshire Cup, played at Thornliebank; but after losing 12–0 at Clippens Thistle in the first round of the following year's tournament, the Athletic leaves no further trace.

=== Death of Daniel Houghney ===
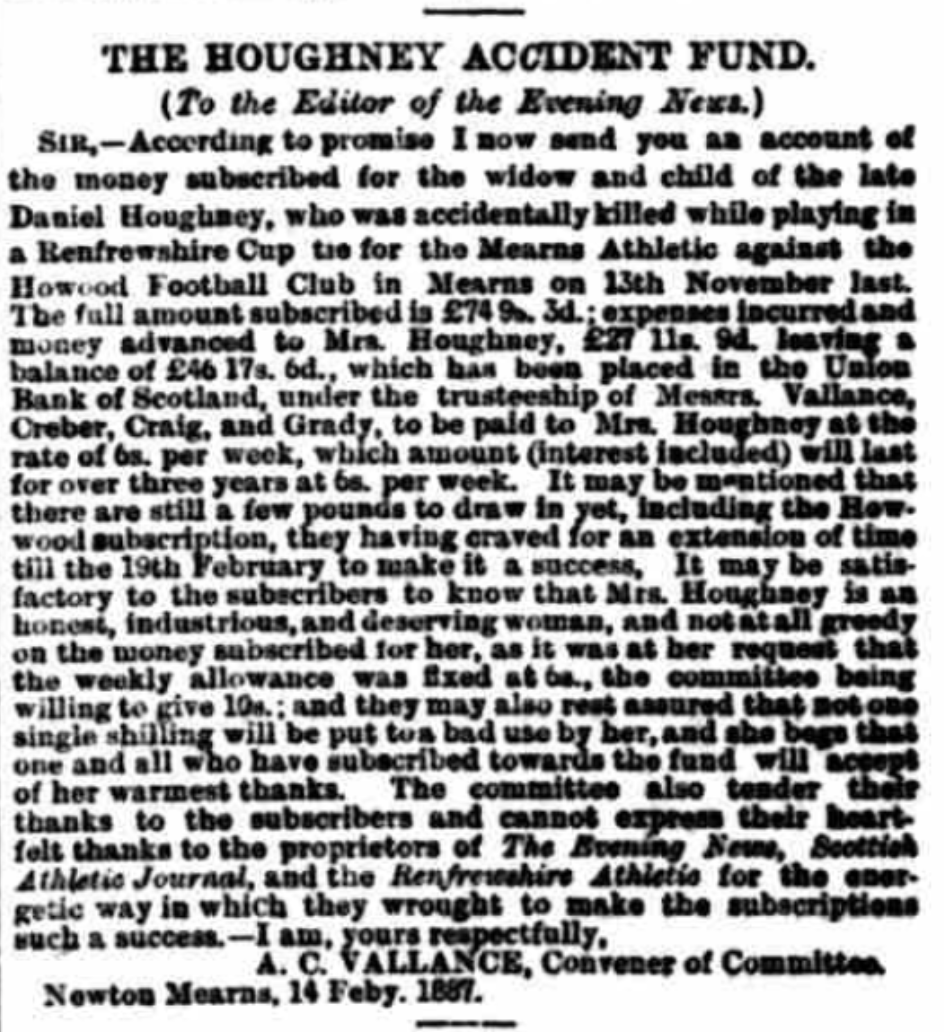
Fund raised for the late Daniel Houghney of Mearns Athletic, Glasgow Evening News, 14 February 1887

In the first round of the 1886–87 Renfrewshire Cup, the Athletic lost 1–0 to Howwood, but protested against the non-registration of a Howwood player, and the match was ordered to be re-played at Croft Park. The match, which took place on 12 November, was a rough one, three Athletics players being injured, and Howwood winning 3–2. Daniel Houghney, one of the Athletics' backs, was struck in the stomach by the knee of Hattrick of the Howwood, and was carried off. Houghney's injury was so severe that he died the next day. Hattrick was arrested, but no charges were laid.

An accident fund raised £75 for Mr Houghney's widow and child. Houghney was 27 years old.

== Colours ==
The club wore blue and white hooped jerseys and white knickers.

== Ground ==
The club's ground, Croft Park, was 100 yards from the village.

== Notable players ==
- John Kelly, goalkeeper, who played for Celtic in 1888–89 after leaving Mearns Athletic, including in the 1889 Scottish Cup final
