= Woodland F.C. =

Former association football club in Scotland

Woodland
- Founded: 1880
- Dissolved: 1884
- Ground: Meiklerigg Park
- President: W. Craig
- Secretary: Alex. Crombie, Archibald Campbell
- Captain: James Barr
Home colours

Woodland F.C. was an association football club from Paisley, Renfrewshire.

== History ==
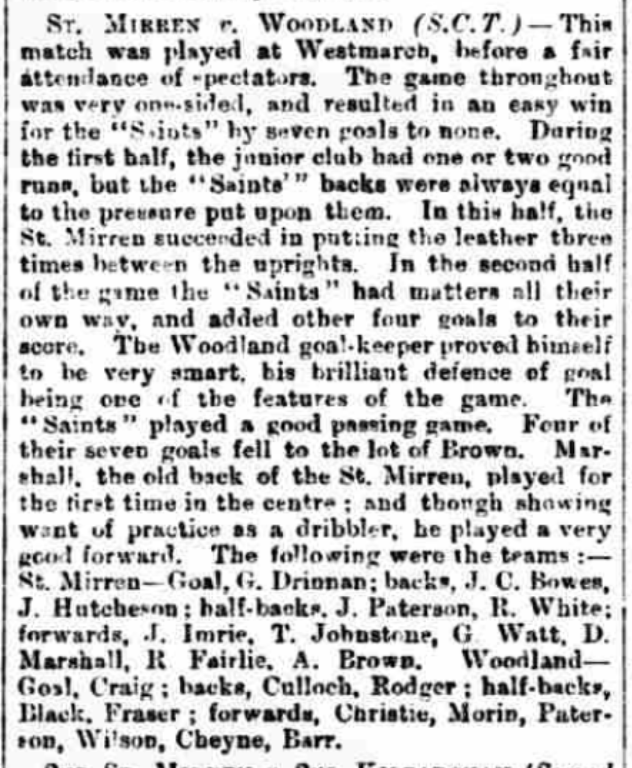
1883–84 Scottish Cup 2nd Round, Woodland 0–7 St Mirren, Paisley & Renfrewshire Gazette, 6 October 1883

Woodland was formed in 1880, with matches recorded from March that year. Caught up in the general explosion of the sport's popularity, it joined the Scottish Football Association in June 1882, at the same time as neighbours Woodside. Never having entered the leading local competition, the Renfrewshire Cup, before turning senior, its first competitive football came in the 1882–83 Scottish Cup. Woodland drew 1–1 with Sir John Maxwell in the first round at home, but lost 5–3 in the replay, throwing away a 3–1 lead.

The two clubs met again in the Renfrewshire Cup a month later, this time the Sir John winning 8–1. Woodland's second and last Scottish Cup attempt in 1883–84 was more successful, inasmuch as the club earned a win, 4–1 at Linwood. In the second round the club was drawn to play St Mirren, one of the two biggest clubs in the town, and went down 7–0. In the first round of the Renfrewshire, the club was drawn at home to Morton, and again lost, although this time by a creditable 4–1 scoreline, and having a goal disallowed for offside when 3–1 down.

With only 40 members at its peak, the club was much smaller than the leading clubs in the town; the big three, Abercorn, Paisley Athletic, and St Mirren had 200, 160, and 200 respectively. The club suffered heavy defeats from all of them in competitive matches. Apart from the Cup tie with St Mirren, Woodland lost 6–1 to Athletic in the first round of the 1882–83 Paisley Charity Cup, in a "most friendly" game "free from any rough play of any description", despite taking an early lead. and 11–2 to Abercorn in the first round of the same competition the following year, the club's final competitive match.

As the season went on, the club struggled at times to find an XI, failing to turn up to a friendly at Northern (Greenock) in March 1884. Along with fellow Paisley side West End Athletic, the club left the Scottish FA before the 1884–85 season.

== Colours ==
The club wore blue jerseys and white knickers.

== Ground ==
The club's ground, Meiklerigg Park, was 20 minutes from Paisley railway station.
