= Bute Rangers F.C. =

Former association football club in Scotland

Bute Rangers
- Full name: Bute Rangers Football Club
- Founded: 1880
- Dissolved: 1902
- Ground: Meadowcap Park
- Match Secretary: Adam Rutherford, J. D. Wilson
1880–84 colours	1892 onwards colours

Bute Rangers Football Club was a Scottish association football club based in the town of Rothesay on the Isle of Bute.

== History ==
The club was founded in 1880 and started with success, winning the Rothesay Cup in its first season. The obvious difficulty for the club on the national stage was its being on an island, requiring sea crossings in order to play. Consequently it was one of the less active senior clubs in Scotland; in 1881–82 it only played 6 matches, winning 2 and drawing 4, scoring 10 and conceding 2.

In 1882–83, the club tried its hand on the national stage, and entered the 1882–83 Scottish Cup, but lost 7–0 at Arthurlie in the first round; the club only conceded one other goal in its other 6 matches.

The following season, the club entered the Scottish Cup again, and was drawn to visit Glenpatrick. The Rangers duly travelled to Castle Park in Johnstone, Glenpatrick's ground, only to find that the home side had not turned up. Bute Rangers duly claimed the tie, and after considering correspondence from both sides, the Scottish Football Association accepted the claim and unanimously disqualified Glenpatrick. In the second round, Bute was drawn to visit Thornliebank in Renfrewshire, and was hammered 14–0. This seems to have dissuaded the club from entering the national competition, and it ceased to be a member of the Scottish Football Association from August 1884.

The Rangers nevertheless continued playing on a local level. It was dominant on the Buteshire scene; it won the local cup competition - called the Rothesay Cup from 1881 to 1886, and the Buteshire Cup afterwards - seven times by 1892, when it ceased being a Senior competition, albeit the competition had no more than 6 entrants in any year.

The Rangers re-emerged on the national stage in 1889–90, entering the Scottish Cup again, and only losing 2–1 against Kilbarchan. In 1890–91 however the club lost heavily, 7–3, at Neilston. The Scottish Football Association then introduced qualifying rounds, and, from 1895, the Scottish Qualifying Cup, and Rangers never won a single tie, until it stopped entering after 1894–95. Its best result was a 4–4 draw with Neilston in 1892–93; this was a second preliminary round tie, Lugar Boswell having scratched to the Rangers in the first, leaving the Rangers out of pocket for match expenses, and requiring a suspension for Boswell in order to get the debt paid.

As a member of the Renfrewshire Football Association, the Rangers were entitled to enter the Renfrewshire Cup, and did so three times. However, the club only played one tie, scratching from two of its entries. Its one match was a 7–1 defeat at Dykebar in 1891–92.

The SFA removed the Rangers from the Roll for non-payment of subscriptions before the 1895–96 season. The club continued as a Junior club, playing in the Scottish Junior Cup; it finally gained a win in a national competition by beating Paisley Thistle 5–3 in the second round in 1895–96, having received a bye in the first. Bute scratched from the third round after a replay required it to visit Hurlford Thistle, and its only other entry, in 1898–99, saw a 6–1 first round defeat at St Blanes. Bute protested against its fellow Rothesay's side's win, but the protest was thrown out. It could not repeat its Senior success in the Buteshire Cup either, never managing to win the competition, which was now dominated by St Blanes and Royal Victoria, and the club was dissolved in 1902.

== Colours ==
The club originally played in white jerseys, white knickers, and blue hose. By the time of its return to the national game in 1889, the club had changed its knickers to blue. In 1892, the club changed to amber and blue shirts and white knickers, possibly taken from the yellow, blue, and white livery colours of the Marquess of Bute.

== Ground ==
Bute Rangers started off at a ground near the High Street, 5 minutes' walk from the quay. In 1891 the club moved to Meadowcap Park in Rothesay.

== Honours ==
Rothesay/Buteshire Cup:

- Winners: 1880–81, 1882–83, 1884–85, 1887–88, 1888–89, 1889–91, 1891–92
- Runners-up: 1881–82, 1885–86
