= Woodvale F.C. =

Woodvale F.C. may refer to:

- Woodvale F.C. (Northern Ireland), an intermediate association football club from Belfast, Northern Ireland.
- Woodvale F.C. (Scotland), a former association football club from Thornliebank, Renfrewshire, Scotland which existed from 1883 to 1889.
