= Sir John Maxwell F.C. =

Association football club in Glasgow City, Scotland

Sir John Maxwell
- Full name: Sir John Maxwell Football Club
- Nickname(s): the Sir John
- Founded: 1879
- Dissolved: 1884
- Ground: Norwood
- Match Secretary: William M'Neil
Home colours

Sir John Maxwell Football Club was a Scottish football team, based in Pollokshaws, now part of Glasgow (at the time a separate burgh).

== History ==
The club was founded in 1879, and with 30 members in 1881 was the smallest senior side in Renfrewshire (joint with Glenpatrick). It was named in honour of a local philanthropist who had died two decades before.

The club entered the Renfrewshire Cup from 1880–81 to 1883–84, reaching the quarter-final in 1881–82 thanks to a bye and one of the club's two wins in the competition; the Sir John protested its defeat by Cartvale at that stage, to no avail. Its last tie was against Johnstone Athletic in the first round in 1883, and with Sir John Maxwell 6–3 up, the Athletic walked off; the match nevertheless was replayed, and the Sir John won with an extra-time goal, but Athletic successfully protested that the Sir John had arrived 25 minutes late - despite being at home - so the Sir John was disqualified.

Its Scottish Cup record was similarly undistinguished, reaching the second round in its first entry in 1882–83, after beating Woodland in a replay in the first, coming from 3–1 down to win 5–3; it lost to Port Glasgow Athletic in the second, following a confusing original tie that was reported as being a 3–3 draw, 4–3 win to the Sir John, 5–3 win to the Sir John, and in any event, 3 goals for the Sir John disputed; perhaps unsurprisingly there was a protest put in, but from the Sir John, on the basis that the referee turned out to have been a member of the Port. The following season it lost to Greenock Northern in the first round, by another 5–3 scoreline, the Scottish Football Association unanimously dismissing a protest as to the state of the ground.

On 18 April 1884, at a meeting at the town hall between members of the club and of the Pollok club, it was agreed to merge the two sides, under the name Pollokshaws. William M'Neil, the match secretary of the Maxwell, was kept on as match secretary for the new club.

== Colours ==
The club wore dark blue jerseys, white knickers, and scarlet stockings.

== Grounds ==
The club played at a private ground at Norwood, with a clubhouse on Maxwell Street.
