= Bridge of Weir F.C. =

Former association football club in Scotland

Bridge of Weir
- Nickname(s): Bridge
- Founded: 1887
- Dissolved: 1902
- Ground: Crofthead Park
- Hon. President: J. A. Muirhead
- Secretary: J. R. Gillies
to 1896 colours	from 1896 colours

Bridge of Weir F.C. was an association football club from the village of the same name in Renfrewshire, active in senior football in the late 19th century.

== History ==
The first Bridge of Weir F.C. was active from 1878 to 1881, its highlight being runner-up in the Johnstone and District Cup to Johnstone F.C. in 1879. It played in the first four editions of the Renfrewshire Cup but lost each of its ties.

Apart from a one-off match in 1886, involving a team of 10 from a coffee factory against a team of 7 said to represent the Bridge of Weir "club", there was no representative side in the village between 1881 and 1887. On 5 November 1887, a scratch team from Glasgow played a pick-up side from the village at Shillingworth Park, and that stimulated a debate as to why there was no football club in Bridge of Weir. Two weeks later the village scratch side beat Kilmalcolm F.C. 2–1, and by the end of the 1887–88 season the Bridge of Weir was playing quite regularly.

It made a low-key return to competitive football in 1888–89, losing in the second round of the Johnstone Cup to Johnstone Union, a protest about rough play being dismissed. In 1889–90 it started to enter the Renfrewshire Cup, and, in 1893–94, having joined the Scottish Football Association, the preliminary rounds of the Scottish Cup.

However Bridge had no success in these competitions. It scratched from the Scottish Cup in its first two entries, thus debarring it from the competition for a season, re-entering in 1896 to play in the new Scottish Qualifying Cup. It scratched twice in four years, losing the other two ties it played, 5–2 at home to Lochwinnoch in 1896–97 and 6–1 at Johnstone in 1898–99, hampered by an injury reducing the Bridge to ten men for part of the game.

It won only one tie in the Renfrewshire; 6–3 against Paisley Academicals in 1892–93. The second round saw the club's heaviest competitive defeat of 13–2 at home to Abercorn. Its final two entries to the competition, in 1897–98 and 1898–99, saw it scratch before playing. The club's record of repeated scratchings saw it thrown out of the Scottish FA in April 1900, and the last records of the club playing date from the end of the 1901–02 season.

== Colours ==
The club originally played in royal blue and scarlet shirts, with blue knickers. In 1896 it changed to blue shirts and black knickers.

== Ground ==
The first ground in the village used for football was Shillingworth Park. On its revival the club played at Gryfe Park, and on turning senior moved to Horsewood. From 1894, it played at Crofthead Park.
