= Greenock Rangers F.C. =

Former association football club in Scotland

Rangers
- Full name: Rangers F.C.
- Founded: 1881
- Dissolved: 1889
- Ground: Wellington Park
- Hon. Secretary: Wm. Hendry
- Match Secretary: Duncan M'Vicar
Home colours

Rangers Football Club was a Scottish football team located in the town of Greenock, Renfrewshire.

== History ==
The club was founded in 1881. Despite the existence of the already-famous Rangers in Glasgow, the Greenock club's official name was also simply Rangers, although the Scottish Football Association recorded it as Rangers (Greenock), and the media usually referred to the club as Greenock Rangers. It replaced Wellington Park at the ground of the same name.

The club turned senior in 1884 by joining the Scottish Football Association. It entered the 1884–85 Scottish Cup, but was hammered 12–1 by Cartvale in the first round; its first entry into the Renfrewshire Cup was almost as disastrous, with an 11–1 home defeat to Neilston. It did however win a tie in the Greenock & District Charity Cup, 5–3 at 1st R.R.V.; it was the club's only competitive victory.

At the time Rangers turned senior, Greenock had a number of clubs, including senior clubs Southern, Greenock Rovers, Lyle Athletic, Northern (Greenock), Morton, and the 1st R.R.V.; between them, they had 320 members, but St Mirren in nearby Paisley had 300 members alone. With 30 members, Rangers was the joint-smallest of them.

However, in 1885, it claimed a 189 members, which would have made it the biggest of the clubs in the town. Nevertheless, it still lost in the first round of the 1885–86 Scottish Cup, 5–1 at Johnstone, and in the first round of the Renfrewshire. The membership figure may be a mistake as by 1886 it had reduced to 60.

Either way, the club was singularly unsuccessful. In four Scottish Cup entries and five Renfrewshire Cup entries, it never won a tie. The only time it reached the second round of the Scottish Cup was in 1886–87, when it successfully protested the 1st R.R.V. for fielding two unregistered players. In the second round Rangers lost 8–2 at Abercorn.

The club had one minor recognition when secretary John B. Walker was elected President of the Renfrewshire F.A. in 1887. It did not help the club - it suffered another double-digit defeat in the national cup and withdrew from the county after arriving late for the tie at Renfrew. The club was considered defunct by 1888–89, with doubts about the club being able to take part in its Scottish Cup tie that season with Pollokshaws Harp justified when the team withdrew; it did however manage to get together a scratch side for the Renfrewshire Cup tie at Port Glasgow Athletic, which ended in another double-digit defeat. the club finally gave up the unequal struggle, not renewing its Scottish FA subscription for the 1889–90 season. The club continued at a new ground as a Junior side, under former secretary M'Vicar, until 1890 and a second side of the same name was formed in 1892.

== Colours ==
The club wore navy blue and white 1" hooped jerseys, white knickers, and red stockings.

== Ground ==
The club firstly played at Wellington Park, at the foot of Whinhill, 5 minutes' walk from Lynedoch railway station. In 1886 it moved to Ladyburn Park.
