= Clippens F.C. =

Former association football club in Scotland

Clippens
- Full name: Clippens F.C.
- Founded: 1882
- Dissolved: 1885
- Ground: Moss Park
- Secretary: James Agnew, Robert Murdoch
Home colours

Clippens Football Club was a Scottish football team from the town of Linwood, Renfrewshire.

== History ==
The club was founded in 1882. It played five matches in its first half-season with 1 win, 3 draws, and 1 defeat. Indeed, the club finished the half-season by winning the Johnstone & District Cup, beating Kilbarchan 3–2 in the final.

Clippens therefore took the step of joining the Scottish Football Association in August, entering both the Scottish Cup and the Renfrewshire Cup in 1882–83. It lost in the first round in both - 3–2 to Glenpatrick in the former and 6–1 to Kilbarchan in the latter.

The club won in the Scottish Cup for the first time in 1883–84, with a 3–2 win over Johnstone Athletic in round 1, and survived a protest about players wearing "tacketed" boots (i.e. with nails in the soles), but lost 5–0 in the second round at Olympic of Greenock. Johnstone Athletic gained revenge in the Renfrewshire Cup second round, beating Clippens 4–0 in a "somewhat rough" tie.

Before the 1884–85 season, Clippens took over the Linwood club, making Clippens a "much stronger combination", first seen to good effect with a win over Greenock Rovers in the first round of the Scottish Cup; the score was 3–1, with two more goal disputed. However, in the second round, the club lost 7–1 at home to Renfrew, with two more Renfrew goals being disallowed. The club did get its best result in the Renfrewshire Cup, with a narrow 1–0 defeat to Morton in the second round. Clippens protested the Morton goal as being offside, to no avail.

Despite the takeover, the club was rapidly overtaken by other clubs in the county. By 1885, it had a mere 30 members, half of its total after its first season. The club did not pay its subscription to the Scottish Football Association, so was struck off the membership roll before the 1885–86 season, which meant it could not enter the Scottish Cup.

The club was replaced in the town the following season by Clippens Athletic, which suffered an abject humiliation in the Renfrewshire Cup, with a 24–0 defeat to Neilston - made even worse by Neilston starting the match with 9 men. In 1887 the club changed its name to Thistle. In 1888–89, a club named Clippens - probably the Thistle - sought entry to the Scottish Cup directly into the second round but the Scottish FA refused permission.

== Colours ==
The club played in all white.

== Ground ==
The club's ground was Moss Park, also known as Old Moss Park, 1 mile from Houston station.

== Notable players ==
- Tom Brandon, later a Scottish international
