= Pollok F.C. (1878) =

Association football club in Glasgow City, Scotland

Pollok
- Full name: Pollok Football Club
- Founded: 1878
- Dissolved: 1884
- Ground: Broom Park
- Match Secretary: William M'Laren
Home colours

Pollok Football Club was a Scottish football team, based in Pollokshaws, now part of Glasgow (at the time a separate burgh).

== History ==
The club was founded in 1878. The club attracted members quickly (65 in its first season) and entered the first Renfrewshire Cup in 1878–79. In 1880–81, the club entered the Scottish Cup for the first time and had its best season in each competition, reaching the semi-final of the Renfrewshire and the third round of the Scottish.

Its Scottish Cup run included a win over Thornliebank, the runners-up in the previous season and reigning Renfrewshire champion club, which "astonished the football world". Pollok lost in both competitions to Arthurlie, who went on to win the Renfrewshire Cup; the Renfrewshire semi-final - at Arthurlie's Dunterlie Park - was decided only by a goal five minutes from time.

Arthurlie also knocked Pollok out of the 1881–82 Scottish Cup, this time in Pollok's first tie in the competition. it did so again in the 1883–84 Scottish Cup with three late goals. In the 1882–83 Scottish Cup, Pollok made it through to the third round, after a narrow win over Renfrew and two draws against Abercorn, entitling both teams to be carried over. This meant that Pollok was drawn to play outside Renfrewshire for the first time, at Lugar Boswell. The trip to Ayrshire was too much for one of the team, who arrived late, and obliged Pollok to play with ten men for the first 30 minutes, to the club's cost - by half-time the score was 5–0. Lugar added one more in the second half, plus two disputed goals.

On 18 April 1884, during a meeting at the town hall between members of the club and of the Sir John Maxwell club, it was agreed to merge the two sides, under the name Pollokshaws. Although a new ground was planned, the new club continued at the Pollok ground.

== Colours ==
The club originally played in dark blue. From 1881, the club played in light blue jerseys, white knickers, and black and white hose.

== Grounds ==
The club played at Broom Park, Cowglen.
