= Avondale F.C. (1884) =

Former association football club in Scotland

Avondale
- Full name: Avondale Football Club
- Founded: 1884
- Dissolved: 1887
- Ground: Alum Work Park
- Hon. Secretary: John Carlin
- Match Secretary: Wm. J Hart
Home colours

Avondale Football Club was a football team from Lennoxtown, Stirlingshire.

== History ==
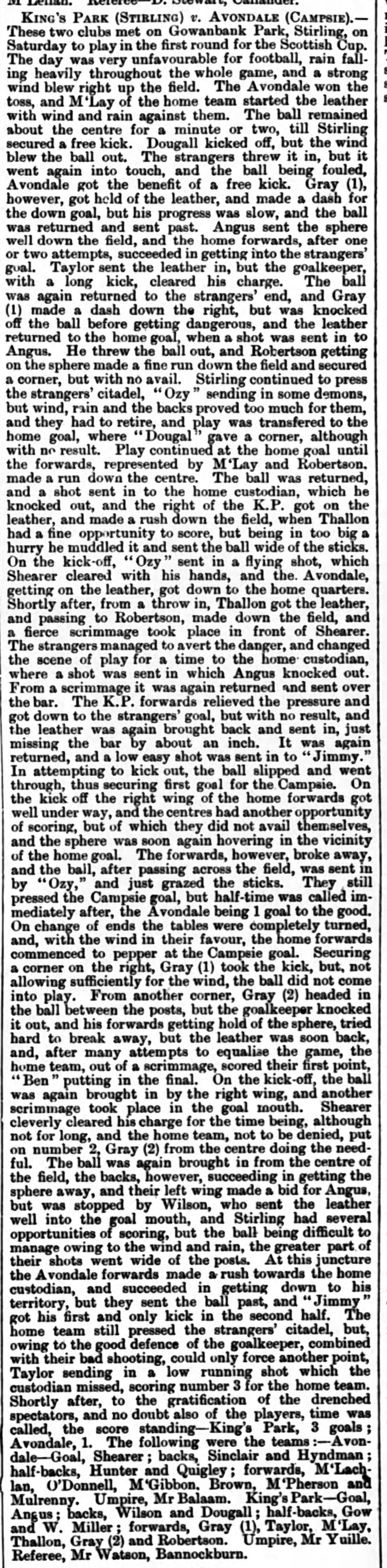
1885–86 Scottish Cup 1st Round, King's Park 3–1 Avondale, Stirling Saturday Observer, 17 September 1885

The club was formed in 1884. It became the third senior club to set up in Lennoxtown, after Central and Campsie.

Avondale joined the Scottish Football Association a year later, having won 6 of 15 matches in its first season. It entered the Scottish Cup in 1885–86 and 1886–87, losing in the first round both times. In the former year it was unlucky to be drawn away to the much larger King's Park, but only lost 3–1, having led at half-time, after the K.P. goalkeeper Jimmy Angus misjudged a long shot "which could have been kept out by an infant", "much to the amusement of the onlookers, and the chagrin of the big 'un". The second half however was a different story, Angus able to don an overcoat in the inclement weather; the crowd was around 200, including a "solitary female who bravely faced the elements". In the latter, the club lost 4–3 at Slamannan.

The club had a little more success in local competition. Its first tie in the Stirlingshire Cup, in 1884–85, was against Tayavalla and Avondale won 6–3. Tayavalla successfully protested on the basis the referee had not turned up, but scratched anyway before the replay. Avondale beat Dunipace in the second round after a "fast and exciting game" but lost at East Stirlingshire in the third. It suffered double digit defeats in the first round in its two other entries, although in 1886–87 it had originally held Falkirk to a draw.

Avondale's short existence came to an end in August 1887, when it was struck from the Scottish Football Association membership roll for non-payment of subscriptions.

== Colours ==
The club played in red and blue jerseys, blue knickers, and red hose.

== Ground ==
The club originally played at Alum Work Park, half-a-mile from Lennoxtown station. In 1886 it moved to Lennoxtown Park.
