= Tayavalla F.C. =

Association football club in Scotland

Tayavalla
- Full name: Tayavalla Football Club
- Founded: 1882
- Dissolved: 1885
- Ground: Camelon House
- Capacity: c. 3,000
- Secretary: John Mackie Reid
1882–83 colours	1883–85 colours

Tayavalla Football Club was a football club from the town of Camelon, Stirlingshire, Scotland.

== History ==
The club was formed in 1882 out of a cricket club, which took its name from the Gaelic term for a house on the Antonine wall near the town. The club entered the Scottish Cup for the first time in 1883–84, losing to East Stirlingshire in the first round.

Tayavalla was a founder member of the Stirlingshire Football Association and played in the first Stirlingshire Cup in 1883–84. The club beat the original Stenhousemuir 5–2 in the first round but lost to eventual finalists East Stirlingshire F.C. in the quarter-final. Tayavalla's Camelon House ground hosted the final, won by Falkirk in a replay.

Before the start of the 1884–85 season, the club was affected by a split, which saw a number of members form the new Camelon club. Despite this the club won its first round tie in the 1884–85 Scottish Cup 2–1 at Stenhousemuir. However, in the second round, the club was utterly outclassed by Yoker, losing 17–0. The club was little better off in the Stirlingshire Cup, losing 6–3 at Avondale of Campsie in the first round; although the club put in a successful protest on the basis the referee had not turned up, it decided to scratch from the competition.

Three months after its elimination from the Stirlingshire Cup, Tayavalla played Camelon for the only time; that the split had been in Camelon's favour was shown by Camelon winning 6–1. Tayavalla hosted the Stirlingshire Cup final again in 1884–85, even though Camelon was one of the clubs competing,

The last Tayavalla match was a 2–1 defeat in a friendly at King's Park in April 1885. Three of the East Stirlingshire side which beat Falkirk 8–1 in a friendly at the end of the 1884–85 season were Tayavalla players, and five of the last Tayavalla side played for East Stirlingshire against Queen's Park early in the 1885–86 season. Given that the club's home colours for 1884–85 were those of East Stirlingshire, Tayavalla had become a de facto supplementary XI for the Shire.

The club was struck off the Scottish Football Association roll before the 1885–86 season for non-payment of subscriptions, ending the club's independent existence.

== Colours ==
The club played in navy shirts and white shorts in its first season, and black and white "striped" shirts with navy shorts in its last two.

== Ground ==
The club played home matches "within the policies" at Camelon House, by Lock 16 of the Forth and Clyde Canal.

== Notable players ==
- Laurie McLachlan, scorer of over 100 goals for East Stirlingshire in the 1880s, played for the club in 1884–85
