= Johnstone Rovers F.C. =

Former association football club in Scotland

Johnstone Rovers
- Full name: Johnstone Rovers Football Club
- Nickname(s): the Rovers
- Founded: 1878
- Dissolved: 1885
- Ground: Mains Park
- Match Secretary: Daniel M'Glyn, William M'Connell
1878–82 colours	1882–85 colours

Johnstone Rovers Football Club was a football club based in Johnstone, Renfrewshire, in Scotland.

== History ==
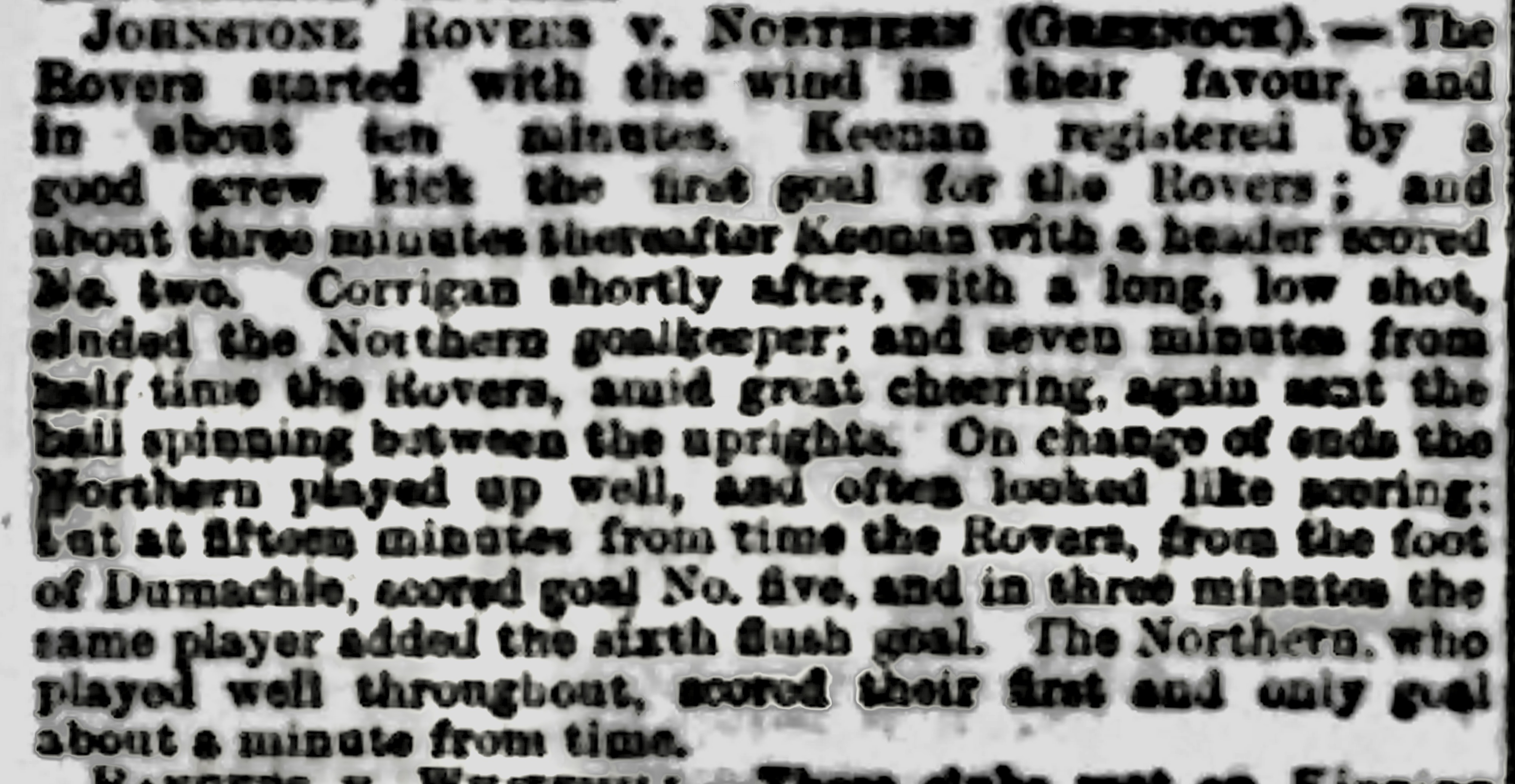
Johnstone Rovers 6–1 Greenock Northern, 2nd round Scottish Cup 1883–84, from the 1 October 1883 North British Daily Mail

The club was one of four senior clubs in Johnstone formed in 1878, along with Cartside, Johnstone F.C. and Johnstone Athletic. The earliest known matches for the club date from October 1879.

Football in Johnstone grew quickly, the three senior sides having 350 members between them; Rovers' 120 members made it the middle club in the town. (At the time, the two senior Paisley clubs only had a total membership of 220.) By the following season the Rovers had a membership of 183, making it the second-biggest club in Renfrewshire, behind only St Mirren.

Its size however did not translate into success. Rovers entered the Johnstone Association Cup from 1879–80 to 1883–84, without ever winning; curiously its second XI reached the semi-final in the final entry, outlasting the senior XI. The clubs generated enough of a reputation for Rovers to be invited to play friendlies in Ireland.

Unlike the Athletic, the Rovers had not been founder members of the Renfrewshire Association, so only entered the Renfrewshire Cup from the competition's second season of 1881–82. The club seemed to have won its first round tie with a 2–1 win over Pollok, but the tie was replayed after a protest. The Rovers let a two goal lead slip to draw 2–2, and after the match "a disgraceful scene took place" as the Pollok referee and players were "mobbed by both spectators and players of the Rover's [sic] club, and at last had to take refuge in the Houston railway station." As a result, the Rovers was expelled from the competition; the Rovers complained that the referee was also the chairman of the committee meeting at which the Rovers' conduct was discussed, although the Pollok stated that the referee was "pursued over hedges and ditches, reaching Paisley all covered with blood and dirt". The Rovers did reach the semi-final in 1882–83, the only season in which the club won any ties.

Rovers entered the Scottish Cup every year from 1880–81 to 1884–85. Similarly to the Renfrewshire, the club only won ties in one year, namely 1883–84. In the first round, Rovers beat Lyle Athletic 4–2 away, and Greenock Northern 6–1 at home. In a sign of how Paisley had overtaken Johnstone in footballing terms, Rovers lost in front of 2,000 spectators at Abercorn 7–0 in the third round.

With the growth of under-the-counter professionalism, Johnstone was too small a town to host three senior football sides; as early as 1881 the Johnstone chairman, Bailie Love, made tentative suggestions of combining the Johnstone and Athletic teams. After Athletic folded in 1884, Rovers still boasted 200 members, more than double that of Johnstone's total, and the same as Abercorn.

Nevertheless, the club members agreed that it made sense to amalgamate the remaining sides, and in 1885 the two clubs merged. Despite Rovers' superior size, and having beaten Johnstone 2–1 in a friendly in October 1884, the new club continued under the simple Johnstone name, wearing Johnstone's navy colours, and at Johnstone's Cartbank Park. The merger may not have received unanimous support, as the Johnstone Harp club was founded in 1886; many of the figures involved in the Rovers had Irish roots.

The name was also used by an unrelated club from Dundee.

== Colours ==
The club originally played in royal blue jerseys, white pants, and royal blue hose. In 1882 the club changed its jersey to white.

== Ground ==
The club originally played at Mains Park, 5 minutes' walk from the station. In 1882 the club moved to Newfield Park.
