= Hugh McHardy =

Scottish footballer

Personal information
- Position: Left back

Senior career*
Years	Team	Apps	(Gls)
- Rangers
- St Mirren

International career
1885	Scotland	1	(0)
- * Club domestic league appearances and goals

Hugh McHardy was a Scottish footballer who played as a left back.

== Career ==
McHardy played club football for Rangers and St Mirren, and made one appearance for Scotland in 1885.
