= Southern F.C. (Greenock) =

Former association football club in Scotland

Southern
- Full name: Southern F.C.
- Founded: 1877
- Dissolved: 1886
- Ground: Finnart Park
- Secretary: James Gordon
1877–83 colours	1883–86 colours

Southern Football Club was a Scottish football team located in the town of Greenock, Renfrewshire.

== History ==
The club was founded in 1877, under the name Greenock (Southern). It turned senior in 1881 by joining the Scottish Football Association under the name Southern.

The club entered the Scottish Cup every year from 1881–82 to 1885–86. Its best run in the competition was in 1884–85, when it reached the third round for the only time. In the first round the club beat Paisley Athletic 3–2 away; in the second, it drew twice with Pollokshaws, which, under the rules of the competition, meant both sides passed into the third round of fixtures. At that stage the club was drawn at Morton and lost 5–0, a turning point having a goal disallowed for a prior foul when 3–0 down.

It first entered the Renfrewshire Cup in 1882–83, and that year was its best run, reaching the quarter-finals; however that was after one win and one bye. In the last eight, the club lost 8–0 at St Mirren.

The club's 1885–86 season demonstrated the gap between the top clubs and the rest had grown to an impossible extent. In the Scottish Cup it lost 10–1 at home to Neilston; an early indication of the erosion in the team's resources being that Southern only had ten men. In the Renfrewshire, the club gained its best competitive win in the first round, 9–2 against Glenpatrick, but in the second round suffered its worst defeat, 14–1 at Morton.

Southern's problem was that the Greenock football market was saturated. In 1884, the town had a number of clubs, including senior clubs Rangers, Greenock Rovers, Lyle Athletic, Northern (Greenock), Morton, and the 1st R.R.V.; between them, they had 320 members, but St Mirren in nearby Paisley had 300 members alone. Southern had but 40 members that season and by 1887 all but three of these clubs had folded. Southern was one of them - along with geographical stablemates Northern, Southern was struck from the Scottish FA membership roll in August 1886, and the Renfrewshire the following month.

== Colours ==
The club originally wore navy jerseys, white knickers, and navy stockings. In 1883 the club changed to 1" hooped black and white jerseys, white knickers, and black and white stockings.

== Ground ==
The club originally played at Finnart Park, a 10-minute walk from the station. In 1882 the club moved to West End Park. In 1884 it moved to Berrylands Park, a 2-minute walk from Upper Greenock railway station.
