= Glenpatrick F.C. =

Former association football club in Scotland

Glenpatrick
- Founded: 1879
- Dissolved: 1886
- Ground: Castle Park
- Hon. Secretary: Alexander Graham
- Match Secretary: James M'Kim, Hugh Neason
Home colours

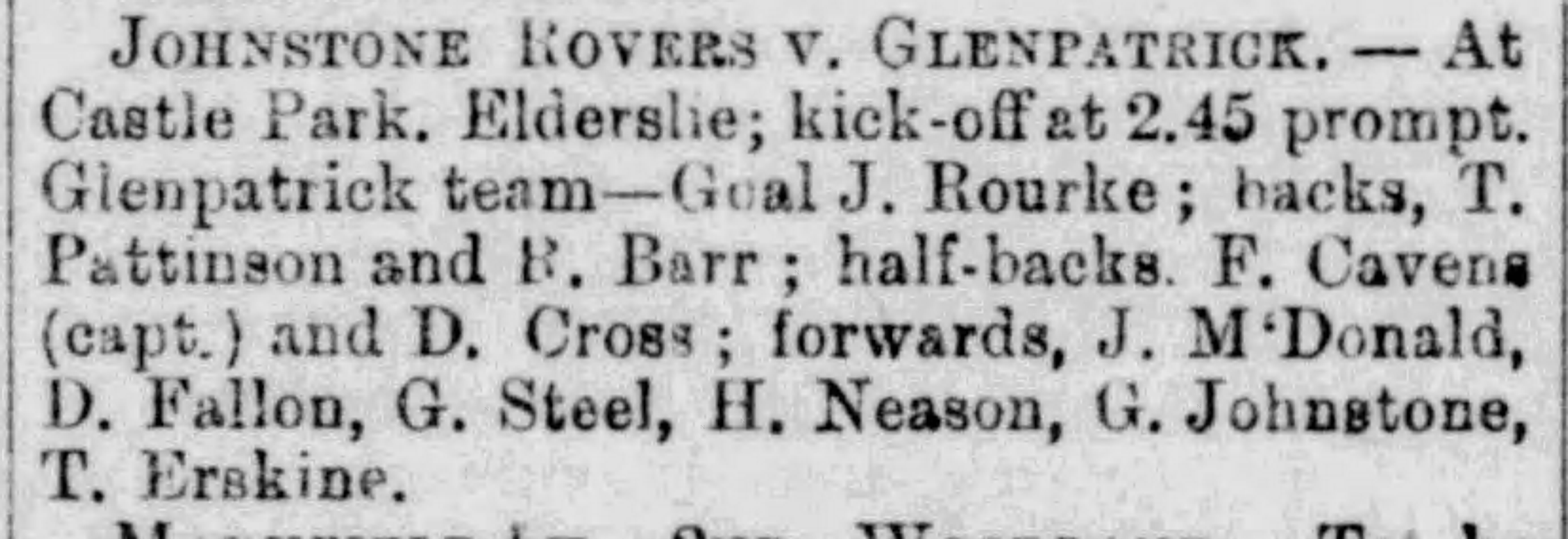
Glenpatrick side for a friendly with Johnstone Rovers, Paisley Daily Express, 1 December 1882

== History ==
The Glenpatrick football club, from Elderslie, near Johnstone, Renfrewshire, was founded in 1879. It may have been linked to the Glenpatrick Carpet Works, which was based in Elderslie, near the club's ground.

The club joined the Scottish Football Association in August 1882, by which time Johnstone already had several clubs which had turned senior. Even though Glenpatrick had grown to 80 members in 1883, there were three other senior clubs in Johnstone which were larger and more established.

Consequently, Glenpatrick was never able to generate any momentum. It did win its first Scottish Cup tie, at Clippens in the first round in 1882–83, either by 3–2 or 4–2; but lost 7–0 to Thornliebank in the second round.

The club did at least get a record 10–0 win over Britannia of Renfrew in the first round of the 1882–83 Renfrewshire Cup, its first appearance in the county competition, but its second round against Arthurlie ended in an 11–1 defeat. Even worse followed at a more local level; in the Johnstone & District Cup, Glenpatrick lost 14–0 to Johnstone, the defeat made even worse by it being at Castle Park.

These heavy defeats seemed to give the club pause. Although it had already entered the 1883–84 Scottish Cup, and was drawn at home to Bute Rangers, Glenpatrick did not turn up, and the Scottish FA awarded the Rangers the tie, as well as made Glenpatrick pay the Rangers' expenses.

With the football scene in the town rationalizing around fewer clubs, Glenpatrick withdrew from senior status before the 1884–85 season. The club played twice more in the Renfrewshire Cup, but, after two more heavy defeats, it faded away by 1886, Johnstone Harp taking over the ground.

== Colours ==
The club wore blue jerseys and white knickers.

== Ground ==
The club's home ground was Castle Park in Elderslie, 200 yards from Elderslie railway station, and its distance from the town was not considered conducive to large crowds.
