= Woodvale F.C. (Scotland) =

Former association football club in Scotland

Woodvale
- Full name: Woodvale Football Club
- Founded: 1883
- Dissolved: 1889
- Ground: Robslea Park
- Secretary: Robert Murray
Home colours

Woodvale Football Club was a football club based in Thornliebank, Renfrewshire, in Scotland.

== History ==
The club was formed in 1883, and turned senior in 1885 by joining the Scottish Football Association. It was a quixotic decision, given the town already had a well-established and successful senior side in Thornliebank F.C., and Woodvale's brief history as a senior club was markedly unsuccessful.

Woodvale entered the Scottish Cup three times. In its first entry, in 1885–86, it beat Mearns Athletic in the first round and lost to Arthurlie in the second. Its second entry ended in withdrawal before playing a tie, and it did not enter again until 1888–89; the club's re-entry to the competition was controversial, as an objection was made on the basis that the club had allegedly forged the registration of David M'Keteridge as a player - the SFA allowed the entry and investigated the charge.

Woodvale beat Johnstone Harp 5–4 away from home in the first round, and in the second, apparently beat the 1st Renfrewshire Rifle Volunteers 3–2. However, Woodvale has lost its ground, and hosted the tie at Thornliebank's. The Volunteers protested that this was a breach of the Cup regulations and the SFA ordered a replay at the 1st R.R.V.'s ground in Greenock, but Woodvale turned up to the replay with only 8 players. Woodvale therefore scratched from the competition, but in order not to disappoint a large crowd, the clubs played a friendly, with Woodvale borrowing two players as substitutes; the Volunteers won 3–0.

Despite winning a couple of Scottish Cup ties, Woodvale's record in the local Renfrewshire Cup was appalling. It entered every season between 1884–85 and 1888–89, but twice scratched, and lost in the other three years in its first matches by a combined score of 29 goals to 0; 11–0 at Arthurlie in 1884–85, 7–0 at Morton in 1885–86, and 11–0 at 1st R.R.V. in 1887–88.

The club's senior run came to an end when the SFA removed the club from the membership roll in August 1889. The club continued on a junior level briefly but no matches are recorded after November 1889, the name being revived by a club in Greenock in 1891.

== Colours ==
The club played in red and blue jerseys with white knickers.

== Ground ==
The club originally played on the North Bank. On turning senior, the club moved to a private ground at Robslea Park, 5 minutes' walk from the station. By 1888, it had found a new home at Arden Park, although it was not available for the Scottish Cup tie with the 1st R.R.V.
