= Stenhousemuir F.C. (1881) =

Association football club in Larbert, Scotland

Stenhousemuir
- Full name: Stenhousemuir Football Club
- Founded: 1881
- Dissolved: 1885
- Ground: South Broomage
- Secretary: J. Morrison
Home colours

Stenhousemuir Football Club was a Scottish football club located in Stenhousemuir, Falkirk.

== History ==
The club was founded in 1881, out of a cricket club.

Stenhousemuir was a founder member of the Stirlingshire Football Association and played in the first Stirlingshire Cup in 1883–84. The club lost to Tayavalla 5–2 in the first round.

The same season the club entered the Scottish Cup for the first time. Stenhousemuir beat Strathblane 3–2 in the first round, but lost 9–1 to Falkirk in the second.

In the first round of the 1884–85 Scottish Cup, the club lost again to Tayavalla, this time at home. Stenhousemuir did at least win a tie in the Stirlingshire Cup, 3–2 at the unheralded Falkirk Harp, but lost 4–1 at Camelon in the second round. The club appears to have given up football after this defeat, and the Scottish Football Association struck the club from membership before the 1885–86 season.

== Colours ==
The club played in black and white hooped jerseys and hose, with blue knickers.

== Grounds ==
The club originally played at Burnhead, 5 minutes' walk from Larbert station. From 1884 the club played at South Broomage.
