= Neilston F.C. (1883) =

Former association football club in Neilston, Renfrewshire, Scotland

Neilston
- Full name: Neilston Football Club
- Founded: 1883
- Dissolved: 1902
- Ground: Nether Kirton Park
- Capacity: 2,000
- President: John Montgomery
- Hon. Secretary: Hugh Cairnduff
- Match Secretary: Robert Cairnduff
Home colours

Neilston Football Club was a Scottish football team, based in Neilston, in Renfrewshire, Scotland.

== History ==
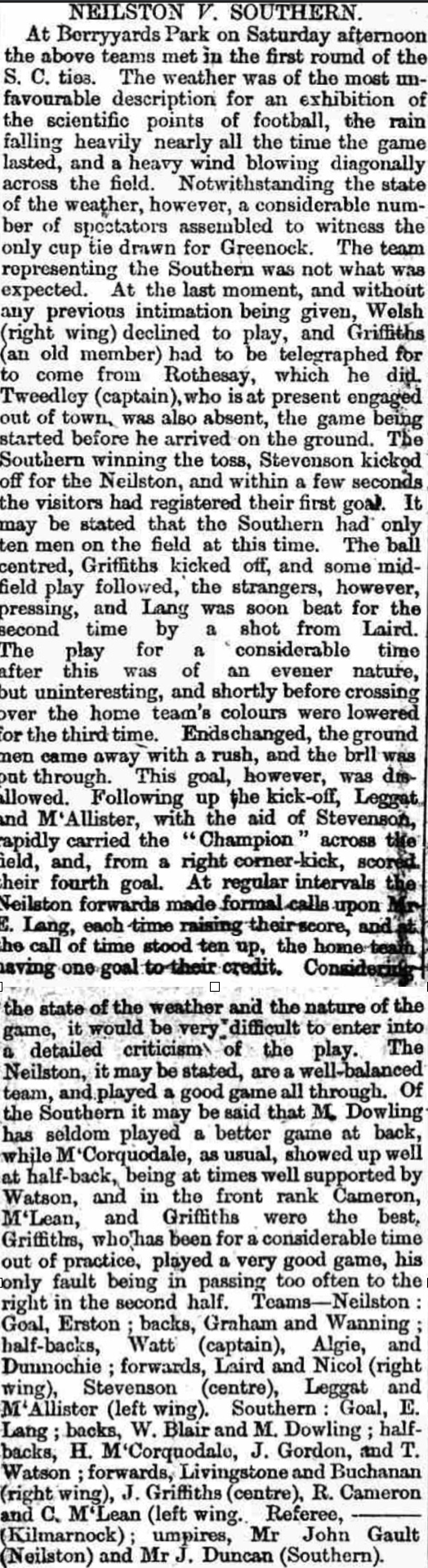
1885–86 Scottish Cup 1st Round, Southern (Greenock) 1–10 Neilston, Greenock Telegraph, 14 September 1885

The club was founded in 1883. Its earliest reported match (at home to Grafton on 5 January 1884) was in front of 1,000 spectators.

=== Scottish Cup ===
Neilston was not a successful club. Although it entered the Scottish Cup every season from 1884–85 until 1901–02, it only ever won two ties in the main competition. After the introduction of preliminary rounds in 1891–92 and the Scottish Qualifying Cup in 1895–96, Neilston never played in the first round proper again - indeed Neilston only won three further ties.

Neilston's best performance in the competition came in 1885–86. Neilston won 10–1 away at Greenock side Southern, before holding Port Glasgow Athletic to a 1–1 draw away, losing 2–0 in the replay.

=== Renfrewshire Cup ===
Even though the regional nature of the national competition's early rounds meant that Neilston never won its way out of the Renfrewshire division, it did have success in the Renfrewshire Cup. Neilston reached the semi-finals in 1885–86, 1886–87, 1888–89, 1891–92, and 1894–95. Neilston was also runner-up in the Victoria Cup, a consolation tournament for clubs eliminated from the main competition, in 1897–98, losing 3–1 to Thornliebank. Its Renfrewshire Cup run in 1885–86 featured three remarkable wins - 13–0 over Mearns Athletic, 24–0 over Clippens Thistle (13 coming in the first half, after Neilston had to start the game with 9 men), and 10–1 away at Kilnside - before losing almost as heavily (7–0) to Port Glasgow Athletic in the semi.

The club's best semi-final performance was in 1886–87; at home to Arthurlie, with a crowd of 2,000, the visitors beat Neilston 3–2. The club also came close to the final in 1888–89, playing at home against Abercorn before another crowd of 2,000, Neilston taking the lead before going down 3–1.

=== Friendlies in Ireland ===
In 1887, thanks to the club's comparative success in the Renfrewshire, it was invited to Ireland to play a New Year's Eve friendly against Linfield, the first match Linfield had ever played against a team from Great Britain; the match ended 3–3. In August 1888 the club was invited back to play Distillery, the home side winning 4–0.

=== League competition ===
In 1892, the club took the step of embarking on league football, by joining the Scottish Football Federation, which had been founded in 1891. The club only played in the 1892–93 season before the competition wound up. The Federation had proved to be a financial drain, given the distances involved and the £5 guarantee for visiting sides, and the clubs agreed to dissolve the Federation to start a new, smaller, competition, for ten clubs, to be called the Scottish Football Combination; Neilston was one of the seven clubs accepted. However the Combination never started, as, after the Scottish League absorbed many of the Scottish Football Alliance members in its new Second Division, four of the six Combination clubs (Albion Rovers, Wishaw Thistle, Arthurlie, and Royal Albert) joined the Alliance instead. A fifth club - Motherwell - joined the League itself. Neilston was left on the sidelines, even though its one Federation season had been successful, the club finishing 3rd overall with 10 wins in 18, the biggest win being 7–1 over Pollokshaws; Neilston had been lucky that the original game was abandoned due to darkness with the club 3–2 down.

The club tried league football again in 1895–96, finally joining the Alliance, 6 of whose 10 members would play (or had played) Scottish League football. In this higher standard, Neilston struggled, and finished 8th - this was the bottom-but-one spot at Northern did not complete the season. Having lost money over the season, Neilston did not seek re-election.

=== End of the club ===
Neilston's last attempt at league competition was in a re-formed Federation in 1898–99, which now included some reserve sides; but it was disastrous for the club, Neilston losing all six of its matches and not finishing out the season. The club was moribund in the aftermath, not entering the Renfrewshire until 1901 and then scratching from its first tie, and losing 4–1 at Johnstone in the first round of the Qualifying Cup in 1901. The Scottish Football Association gave the club one last chance in April 1902, when voting against striking the club from the roll, but the club never seems to have played again.

== Colours ==
The club wore dark blue jerseys and knickers, with red hose.

== Grounds ==
The club originally played at Nether Kirton Park, 15 minutes' walk from the station. In 1891 the club moved to Holehouse Park.
