= 1st Renfrewshire Rifle Volunteers F.C. =

Association football club in Greenock, Scotland

1st R.R.V.
- Full name: 1st Renfrewshire Rifle Volunteers Football Club
- Nickname(s): the Riflemen, the Volunteers
- Founded: 1884
- Dissolved: 1890
- Ground: Academy Park
- Hon. secretary: James A. Brown
- Match secretary: Daniel Menzies
Home colours

The 1st Renfrewshire Rifle Volunteers Football Club was a 19th-century association football club based in Greenock, Scotland.

== History ==
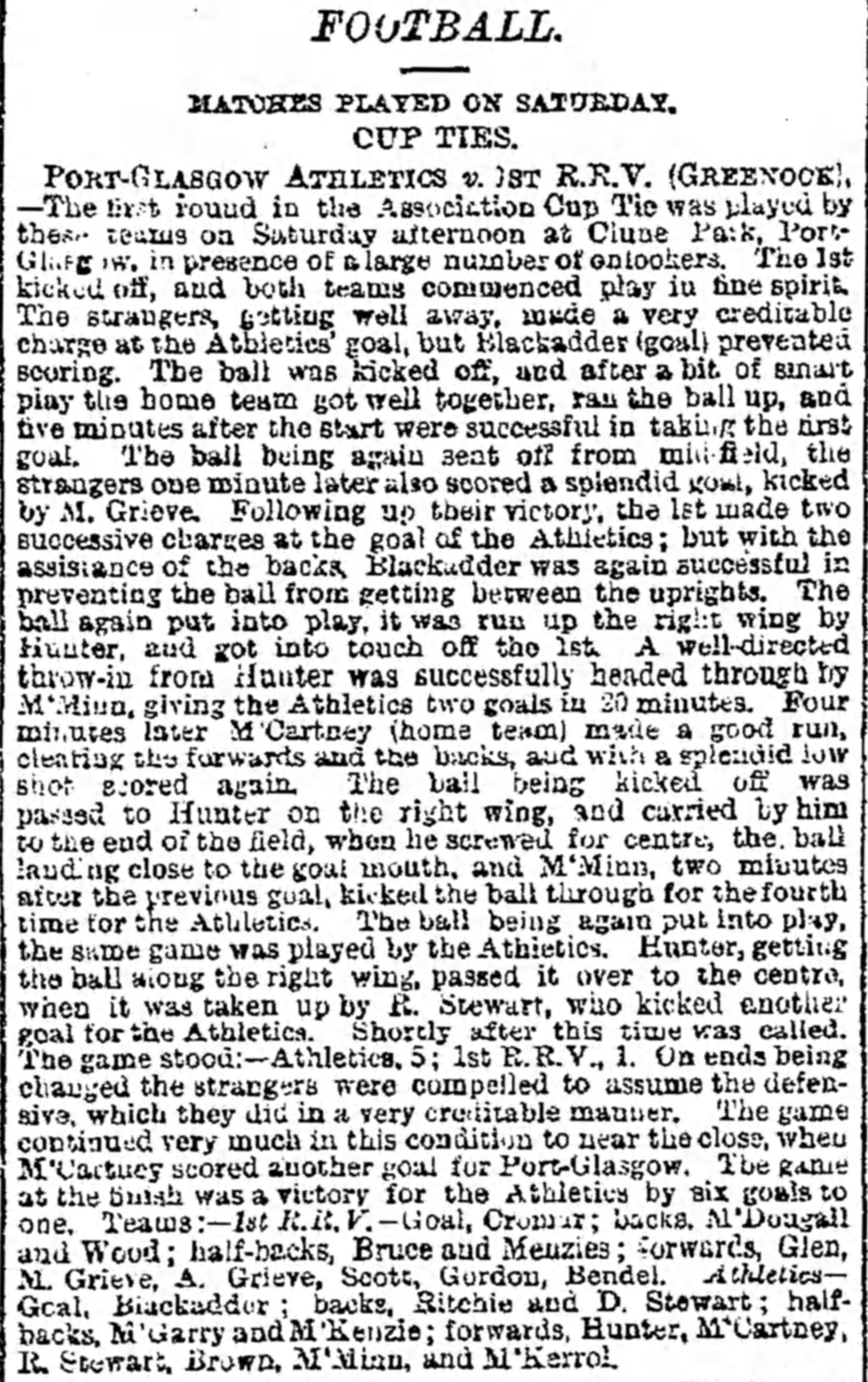
1st R.R.V.'s first Scottish Cup tie, Glasgow Daily Herald, 15 September 1884

The club was formed out of the 1st Renfrewshire Rifle Volunteers, a company in the Volunteer movement of the British Army. The Volunteers included sporting activities within their purview and newspapers often carried reports of such activities. The growth of football in Scotland, especially thanks to Queen's Park F.C., and the success of army teams in England such as the Royal Engineers A.F.C., encouraged regiments to form football clubs as part of the physical regimen.

The 1st R.R.V. was formed in 1884 with 50 members and immediately joined the Scottish Football Association as a senior club. This entitled the Volunteers to enter the Scottish Cup, and it did so every year from 1884–85 to 1889–90.

The 1st R.R.V. however was a latecomer to the senior game amongst the Volunteer clubs, with only the 5th K.R.V. remaining of the senior sides, not counting the 3rd Lanarkshire which had a much broader sweep; only one other Volunteer side (the 6th G.R.V.) would turn senior afterwards. Consequently, although the 1st R.R.V.'s membership rose to 100 by 1886, it constantly struggled against clubs in the area who had a wider recruitment.

This is demonstrated by the Volunteers' Scottish Cup record. With the competition seeded on a regional basis in the era, the club was drawn against other senior clubs in the Renfrewshire area, and, in six entries, it only ever won one tie. Even when the club thought it had beaten Greenock Rangers in the first round in 1886–87, the losers protested on the basis that two of the Riflemen had not properly been registered as players, and the SFA disqualified the club.

The club did reach the third round in 1888–89, but without playing a match. In the first round the club drew a bye and in the second the club lost 3–2 at Woodvale, who hosted the tie at Thornliebank's ground as it lacked its own private ground; the Volunteers protested that this was a breach of the Cup regulations and the SFA ordered a replay at Academy Park, but Woodvale turned up to the replay with only 8 players. Woodvale therefore scratched from the competition, but in order not to disappoint a large crowd, the clubs played a friendly, with Woodvale borrowing two players as substitutes; the Volunteers won 3–0. In the third round the Volunteers lost 4–3 at home to Kilbirnie before a crowd of 2,000.

The Volunteers finally won a tie legitimately for the first time in its final entry. Drawn at home to Pollokshaws Harp, the Riflemen went behind early, but stormed back to win 7–1. Reality bit in the second round; at Morton, the score was 7–1 again to the home side, but this time at half-time, the match ending 10–2 to the homesters.

The club was also an entrant to the Renfrewshire Cup, in the same seasons, two highlights being an 11–0 hammering of Woodvale in 1887–88 and an 8–0 beating of Johnstone Harp in 1888–89. The 1887–88 season saw the club's best run in the competition, also beating Kilbarchan to reach the quarter-finals, where Arthurlie proved a step too far.

With the rise of professional football (originally in England), the 1st R.R.V. could no longer remain competitive against clubs with a wider constituency, and it was struck off the SFA's register before the 1890–91 season.

A Junior club of the same name was subsequently formed. More popularly known as Greenock Volunteers, this existed until around 1901.

== Colours ==
The club wore red, black, and yellow hooped shirts, with dark knickers.

== Grounds ==
The club played on the Academy Park, 7 minutes' walk from Prince's Pier station. In 1889, the club registered its ground as Volunteer Park, although this may have been the same location.
