= Northern F.C. (Greenock) =

Former association football club in Scotland

Northern
- Full name: Northern F.C.
- Founded: 1880
- Dissolved: 1886
- Ground: Bogston Park
- Secretary: William Alexander, Archibald Malcolm
Home colours

Northern Football Club was a Scottish football team located in the town of Greenock, Renfrewshire.

== History ==
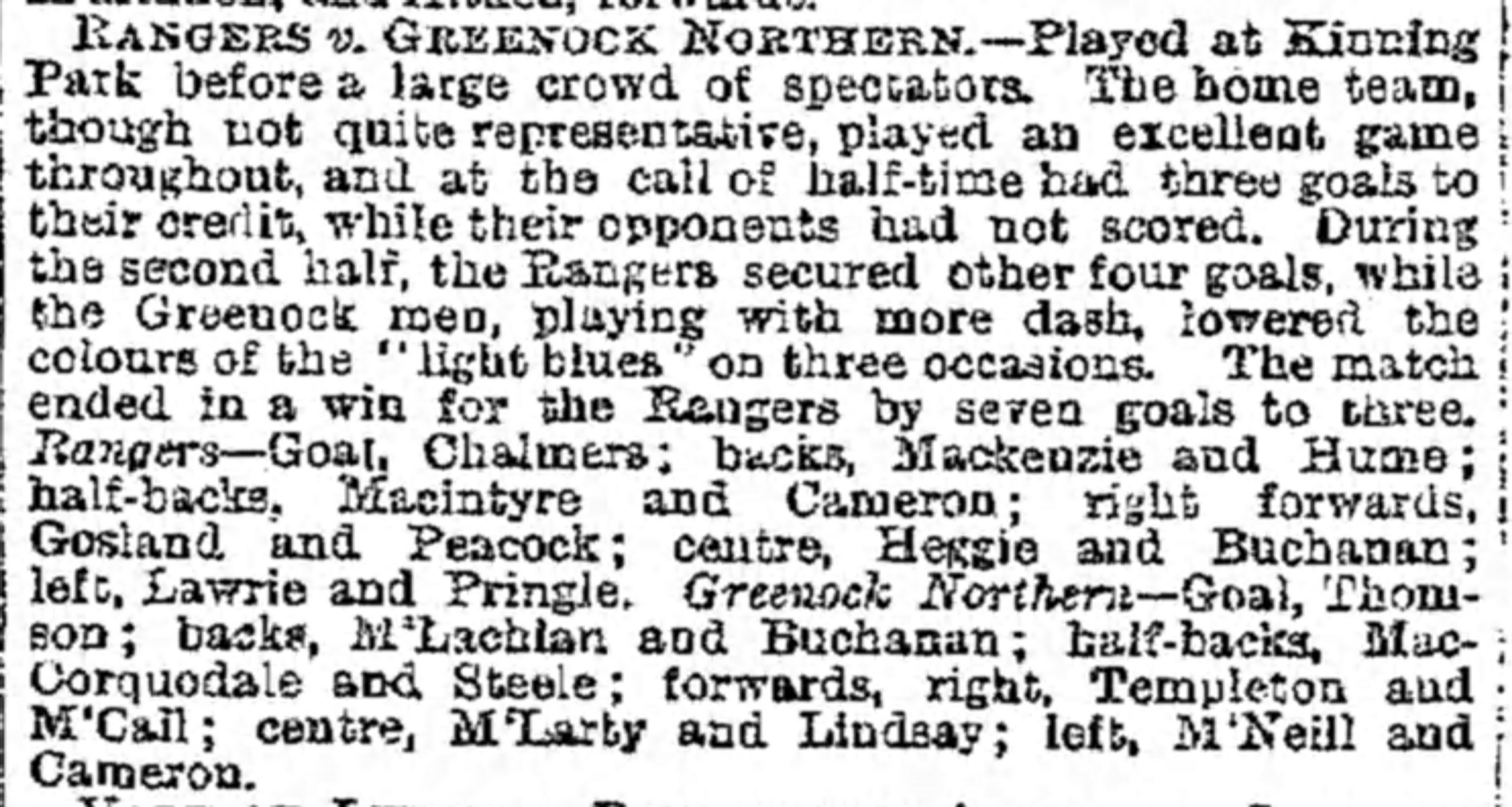
OThe club's final match, a 7–3 defeat at Rangers; Glasgow Herald, 8 March 1886

The club was founded in 1880. Despite the existence of the Glaswegian club Northern, the Greenock club's official name was simply Northern as well, and it was admitted to membership of the Scottish Football Association in 1883 as Northern;. Outside Renfrewshire the club was usually referred to as Greenock Northern.

Its first competitive football came in 1883–84, with entries to the Scottish Cup and the Renfrewshire Cup. The club won its first match in both competitions, and lost in the second round in both. In the 1883–84 Scottish Cup, the club beat Sir John Maxwell 5–3 at home in the first round, and survived a protest from the visitors as to the state of the Bogston pitch. In the second the club went down 6–1 at Johnstone Rovers. In the Renfrewshire, Northern "made short work" of the junior side Greenock Caledonia, winning 4–0 at home, but lost a close game with Arthurlie in the second round.

Northern entered both competitions for the next two years, and lost in its first fixture every time, albeit only losing by the odd goal in seven to the much bigger St Mirren in the 1884–85 Renfrewshire, considered something of "a moral victory" for Northern.

Northern's problem was that the Greenock football market was saturated. In 1884, the town had a number of clubs, including senior clubs Rangers, Greenock Rovers, Lyle Athletic, Southern (Greenock), Morton, and the 1st R.R.V.; between them, they had 320 members, but St Mirren in nearby Paisley had 300 members alone. Northern had 50 members that season and grew to 70 in 1885, but by 1887 all but three of these clubs had folded. Northern was one of them; after a defeat to Rangers in March 1886, "lt is stated freely that the Northern Football Club is thing of the past, it cannot be the fault of their energetic match secretary, Mr Alexander". Along with Greenock geographical stablemates Southern, it was struck from the Scottish FA membership roll in August 1886, and the Renfrewshire the following month, its players "throwing in [their] lot with the Morton". The club was resuscitated briefly as a Junior club.

== Colours ==
The club's colours were royal blue jerseys, white knickers, and red hose.

== Ground ==
The club played at Bogston Park, a 5-minute walk from the Bogston railway station. It shared the ground with Lyle Athletic.
