= Pollokshaws F.C. =

Association football club in Glasgow City, Scotland

Pollokshaws
- Full name: Pollokshaws Football Club
- Nicknames: the 'Shaws, the Queer Folk
- Founded: 1884
- Dissolved: 1895
- Ground: Broom Park
- President: William M'Lean
- Match Secretary: William M'Neil
1884–89 colours	1889–94 colours

Pollokshaws Football Club was a Scottish football team, based in Pollokshaws, now part of Glasgow (at the time a separate burgh).

== History ==
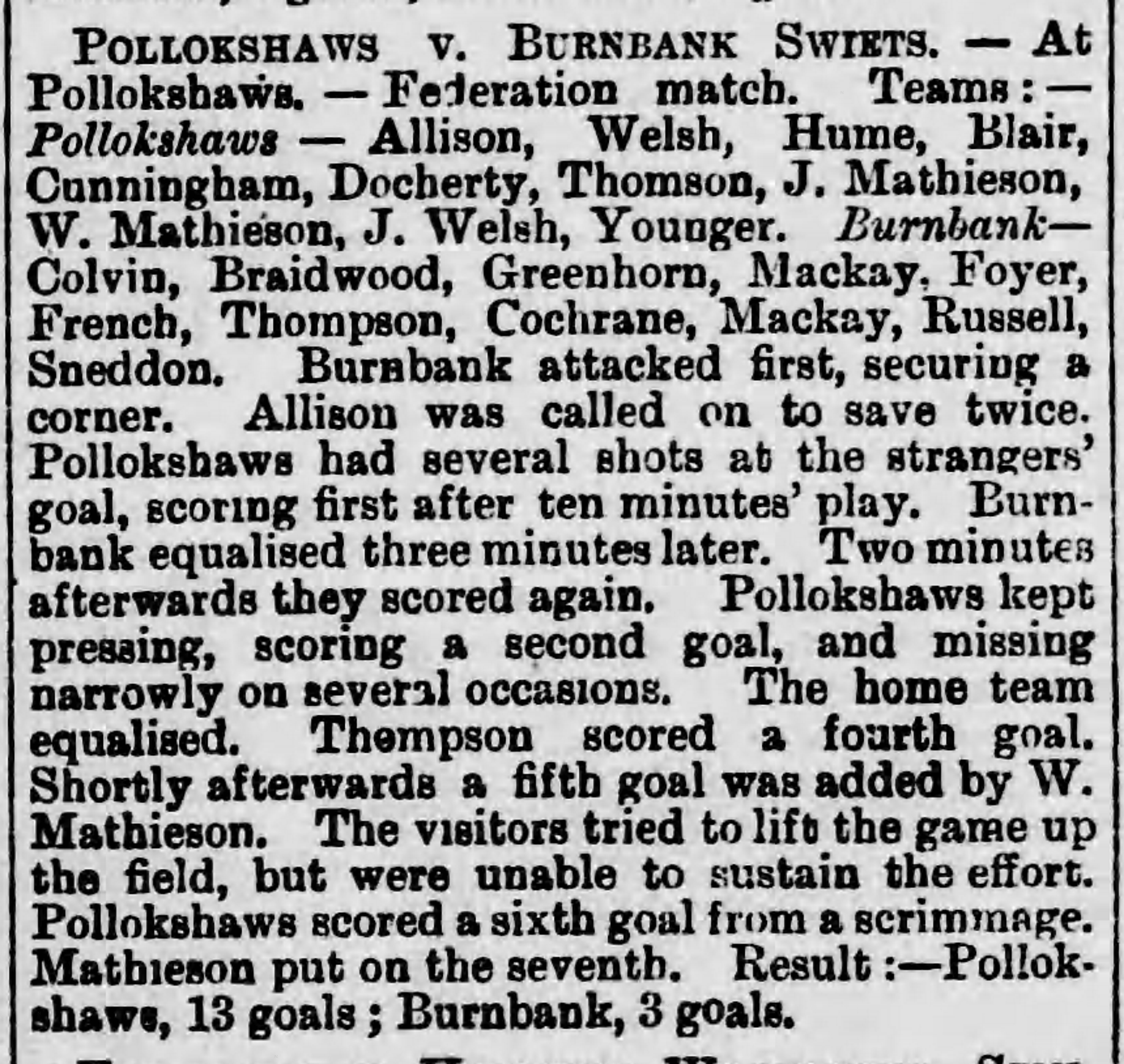
Pollokshaws 13–3 Burnbank Swifts, Scottish Football Federation, 12 March 1892. Taken from the Rutherglen Reformer, 18 March 1892.

The club was founded on 18 April 1884, at a meeting at the town hall, as a merger between the Pollok and Sir John Maxwell clubs; William M'Neil, the match secretary of the Maxwell, was kept on as match secretary for the new club. The club was the second club with the Pollokshaws name, the original club lasting from 1876 to 1878.

The new club entered the Scottish Cup and the Renfrewshire Cup for the 1884–85 season. In the former competition, the club received a bye in the first round, and after two draws against Southern of Greenock in the second, the club (in accordance with the competition's rules) was given a third-round place. The club's run ended with a 4–0 defeat at Thornliebank.

One week after the Thornliebank defeat, Pollokshaws gained a measure of comfort with its equal biggest-ever win in competitive football, beating Houston Athletic 14–0 in the Renfrewshire Cup, but the club lost in the second round to Olympic of Paisley.

For some reason the club did not enter the 1885–86 Scottish Cup, only the Renfrewshire, losing again to Thornliebank. Its best run in the Renfrewshire came in 1886–87, two wins (one of which was a splendid 5–3 win at St Mirren, coming from 3–2 down at half-time, despite injury reducing the side to 10 men, and having to play into a stiff wind) and a bye taking it into the quarter-finals, where the club took Abercorn to a replay; Abercorn went on to win the competition. The club had some fervid support at the time - at Christmas 1886, after Abercorn had beaten Pollokshaws in the Renfrewshire Cup replay, two ironworkers were accused of assaulting a tramway car conductor who had "made a disparaging remark" about the club, and one was sentenced to 30 days' imprisonment.

The club only won two ties in the main rounds of the Scottish Cup - another 14–0 win, this time against Carlton of Greenock, in 1888–89, and 3–1 against Dykebar the following year - and did not win through to the main rounds after the introduction of qualifying rounds in 1891–92, falling one round short in 1892–93. Indeed, in the first qualifying round in 1891–92 the club suffered its biggest Cup defeat, 12–0 at Ayr, ten goals coming in the second half as the 'Shaws had to face an "incessant downpour".

From 1889 to 1890, the club moved from the Renfrewshire FA to the Glasgow Football Association and started to enter the Glasgow Cup instead, but in seven entries only won one tie, 3–1 at Rutherglen in 1890–91 - the third 'Shaws goal provoking a "free fight" in the crowd, which "did not interfere with the progress of the game".

The lack of success meant that the club was overlooked for membership in either the Scottish League or the Scottish Football Alliance. The club, therefore, got together with a number of others to found the Scottish Football Federation in 1891. The competition lasted for two seasons, Pollokshaws finishing mid-table in both, recording three double-digit wins - 13–3 win over Burnbank Swifts in March 1892, 14–1 over Clydebank in November 1892, and 10–2 over Falkirk in January 1893 - but the Federation closed at the end of the 1892–93 season. The Federation had proved to be a financial drain, given the distances involved and the £5 guarantee for visiting sides, and the clubs agreed to dissolve the Federation to start a new, smaller, competition, for ten clubs, to be called the Scottish Football Combination; Pollokshaws was one of the seven clubs accepted. However the Combination never started, as, after the Scottish League absorbed many of the Alliance members in its new Second Division, four of the six Combination clubs (Albion Rovers, Wishaw Thistle, Arthurlie, and Royal Albert) joined the Alliance instead. A fifth club - Motherwell - joined the League itself.

Without a league competition, Pollokshaws withered. The club's last recorded competitive match, against Rangers in the 1893–94 Glasgow Cup, ended in an 11–0 defeat; its last recorded friendly match, at Vale of Leven in April 1894, ended in a 7–0 defeat. Pollokshaws entered both the Scottish Cup and Glasgow Cup in 1894–95 but withdrew from both before playing a tie, and the club was formally struck off before the 1895–96 season.

== Colours ==
The club originally wore red jerseys and white knickerbockers, with a black and white hose. In 1889 the club changed to red and white vertical stripes, with blue knickers.

== Grounds ==
The club originally played at Broom Park, Cowglen. In 1889 the club moved to Maxwell Park.

== Nickname ==
The media referred to the club as the 'Shaws, but also as the Queer Folk, taken from the nickname given to Flemish weavers who came to the area in the 17th century.
