= Kilbarchan F.C. =

Former association football club in Scotland

Kilbarchan
- Full name: Kilbarchan F.C.
- Nickname(s): the Habbies
- Founded: 1879
- Dissolved: 1906
- Ground: Mountview Park
- Secretary: James Wright Hill
1879–84 colours	1894–1901 colours

Kilbarchan Football Club was a Scottish football team located in the village of Kilbarchan, Renfrewshire.

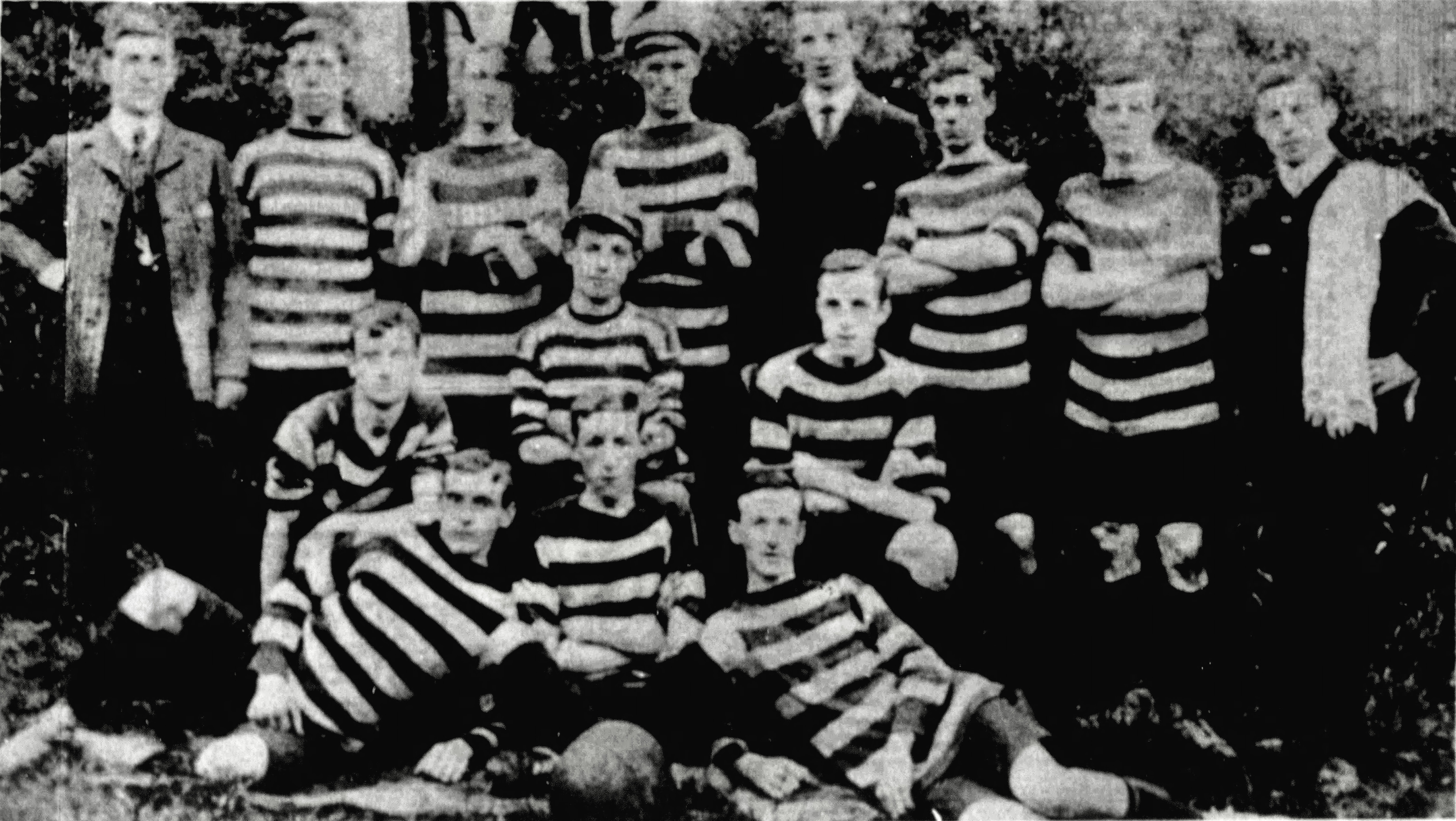
Kilbarchan F.C., late 1880s

== History ==
The club was founded in October 1879. Despite being one of the smaller sides in the county, the club survived, with scant success, for almost three decades.

The club's first notable achievement was reaching the final of the Johnstone & District Cup in 1881–82, losing to Clippens; the club would gain revenge in the final two years later.

1881–82 also saw the club's first entries into the Scottish Cup and Renfrewshire Cup. In the county competition, Kilbarchan went out at the first time of asking, 4–1 to Renfrew. In the national competition, however, the club had what proved to be its best run, reaching the third round. In the first round, the club beat Ladyburn 8–1, thanks to six unanswered second-half goals, and in the second won 4–3 at Wellington Park, in a match played at Morton's Cappielow Park. In the third, the club lost at Johnstone at the third time of asking; Kilbarchan had won the original tie 2–1, but Johnstone successfully protested that the winning goal came from a deflection off an encroaching spectator, and that, when the ball went out of play, the Kilbarchan fans continually ran the clock down by kicking the ball further away. The second attempt was drawn and the third won by Johnstone. Kilbarchan put in a protest after Johnstone's win, but not against Johnstone; it protested that, under the competition rules, after two draws, both clubs should have been advanced. However the Scottish FA ruled that the first match had been voided, so did not count towards the total.

Kilbarchan entered both competitions until 1905–06, although missed two seasons in the 1880s. It only ever won two more matches in the Scottish Cup proper - 6–0 at Woodside in 1882–83 and 2–1 at Bute Rangers in 1889–90 - and after the introduction of a qualifying stage in 1891–92 never made the first round proper again. The club did however earn its biggest competitive win in the first qualifying round in 1891–92, 10–0 over the 1st Argyll Rifle Volunteers.

The club was similarly unsuccessful in the Renfrewshire competition, only twice winning two ties in any season. The first time, in 1889–90, put the club in the quarter-finals; the second time, in 1901–02, into the semi-final, with the rise of the various leagues having wiped out most of the smaller non-league sides. In the latter season Kilbarchan took Morton to a replay before going out 2–0.

Given the dominance of the leagues, and with some of the Renfrewshire sides being members, a new competition for the smaller clubs, the Renfrewshire Victoria Cup, was set up from 1897, and the club had more success against a lower standard. The club won the competition in 1901–02, by beating Thornliebank 6–3 in a two-legged final, but that season only four clubs had entered.

Kilbarchan first joined a league in 1896–97, the Renfrewshire Combination, between six Renfrewshire clubs; Kilbarchan won the title, but the competition was not repeated. The club joined a more national league in 1899, the Scottish Football Combination, a competition which included three Scottish League reserve sides, plus six other clubs, three of whom would eventually join the Scottish League. Kilbarchan was not successful in the Combination, finishing near the bottom in its first three seasons - only surviving re-election in 1902–03 over Dykehead on a casting vote - and at the very bottom in 1903–04. It left the competition afterwards.

Its last competitive match was a defeat to Cartvale in the Renfrewshire Cup in 1905–06; the two clubs had been drawn together in the first round of the Scottish Qualifying Cup, but Kilbarchan scratched.

== Colours ==
The club wore the following colours:

- 1879–84: navy jerseys, white knickers
- 1884–87: black and white jerseys, white knickers
- 1887–90: black and white hooped jerseys, blue knickers
- 1890–92: white shirt, blue knickers
- 1892–94: navy blue
- 1894–1901: black and gold hooped shirts, white knickers
- 1901–06: royal blue shirts, white shorts

The club survived a protest from Wellington Park after the clubs' 1881–82 Scottish Cup second round tie, on the basis that Kilbarchan players were not all wearing navy jerseys, but had played in five different coloured jerseys, one of which was the same as Wellington's blue and red.

== Ground ==
The club originally played at Whitlands, just outside the village. In 1890, the club changed ground as well as colours, moving to Overjohnstone Park. The club repeated the process in 1892, moving to Mountview Park.

== Honours ==
- Renfrewshire Combination:
  - Champions: 1896–97
- Renfrewshire Victoria Cup:
  - Winners: 1901–02
  - Runners-up: 1899–1900, 1903–04
- Johnstone & District Cup:
  - Winners: 1883–84
  - Runners-up: 1881–82

== External references ==
- Scottish Cup ties
- Renfrewshire Cup/Renfrewshire Victoria Cup
- Scottish Combination
