= Renfrewshire Cup =

Association football competition

The Renfrewshire Cup was an annual association football competition between teams in the historic county of Renfrewshire in the west central Lowlands of Scotland. The final was generally a Renfrewshire derby contested between the two largest teams in the county, Paisley's St Mirren and Greenock side Morton.

== Tournament ==
The tournament for the Renfrewshire Cup was contested between four teams from the county. St Mirren and Greenock Morton qualified automatically and each team competed with one of the finalist teams from a local amateur tournament, the Victoria Cup. The two victorious teams from these semi-finals went on to compete in the final game.

== History ==
1991 was the last year in which Morton or St Mirren lost to other opposition. On this occasion amateurs Bellaire defeated St Mirren at Love Street with a 1–0 victory. Morton defeated them in the final.

The first tournament was held in 1879 and won by Thornliebank. In the 1953–54 season, Babcock & Wilcox were the only team outwith St Mirren and Morton to win it since Port Glasgow were triumphant in 1909.

The Renfrewshire FA was dissolved in June 1999 when it was merged with the Ayrshire and Lanarkshire FAs to form the West of Scotland FA. This was because the memberships of these associations had fallen below the 7-club threshold placed on them by the Scottish FA.

Despite this, the Renfrewshire Cup continued until it was last contested in 2014, when St Mirren won the trophy at Cappielow, beating Morton 1–0.

=== Former holders ===
As of 19 July 2014

The number of times each team has won the Renfrewshire Cup:

- St Mirren - 55
- Greenock Morton - 53
- Abercorn - 5
- Port Glasgow Athletic - 5
- Arthurlie - 2
- Thornliebank - 2
- Babcock & Wilcox - 1
