= 1888–89 Celtic F.C. season =

Celtic
1888–89 season
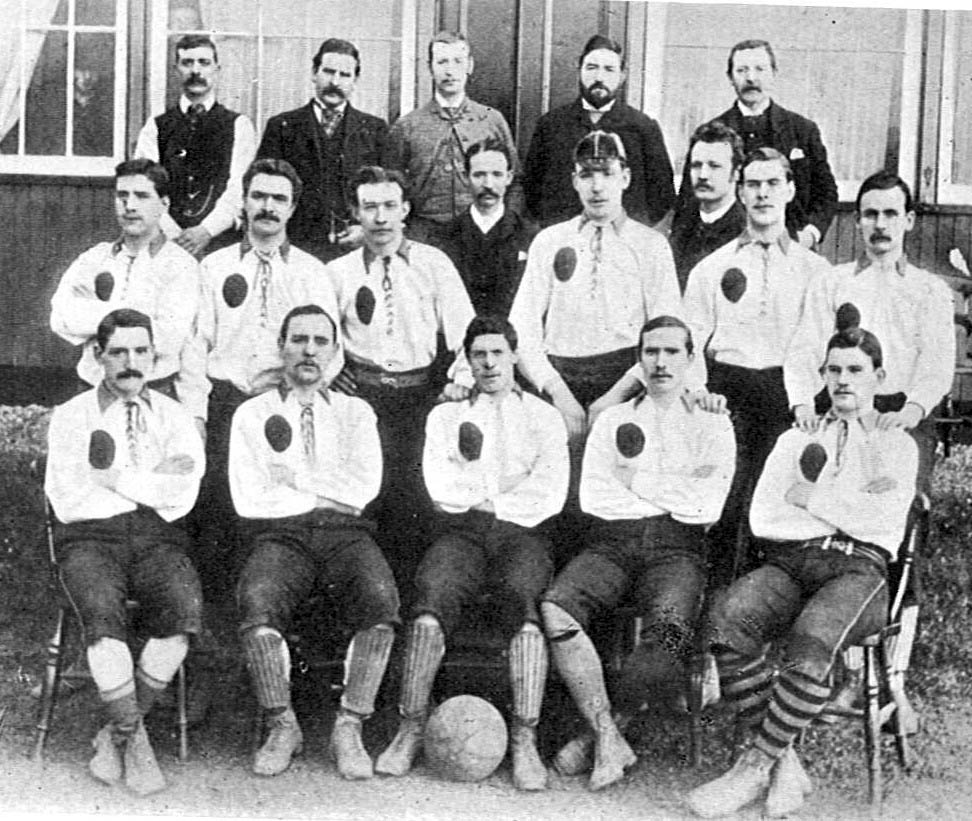
- Chairman: Dr John Conway
- Stadium: Celtic Park
- 1888 Glasgow Exhibition Cup: Runners-up
- Scottish Cup: Runners-up
- Glasgow Cup: Semi-finals
- Glasgow North Eastern Cup: Winners
- Top goalscorer: League: N/A; All: Willie Groves (11)
Home colours

The 1888–89 season was the first season of football by Celtic, a football club set up the previous year in Glasgow, Scotland, with the purpose of alleviating poverty in the Irish–Scots population in the city's East End area. They competed in the Scottish Cup, Glasgow Exhibition Cup, Glasgow Merchants Charity Cup, Glasgow Cup and Glasgow North Eastern Cup, as well as over forty friendly matches.

Their first ever match was a friendly against fellow Glasgow team Rangers at the original Celtic Park on 27 May 1888 which Celtic won 5-2 in front of almost 2,000 spectators. Their first competitive match was a 1-1 draw with Abercorn in the 1888 Glasgow Exhibition Cup.

Celtic ended their first ever Scottish Cup entry as runners-up, as they lost the final 1-2 to Third Lanark at the original Hampden Park. Celtic lost the original final 3-0, but the SFA voided the result due to the poor conditions and the unplayable nature of the pitch through snow. The match was ordered to be replayed the following week, on 9 February 1889, where Third Lanark won again with a 2–1 victory.

The Glasgow club won their first ever competition that season as they defeated Cowlairs 6-1 in the 1889 Glasgow North Eastern Cup final at Barrowfield Park on 10 May 1889.

== Results and fixtures ==
Win Draw Loss Postponed

=== Pre-season and friendlies ===
28 May 1888 Friendly	Celtic	5–2	Rangers	Glasgow, Scotland
15:00 GMT	Maley; Kelly; Maley; Maley; McCallum	Celtic Report	Soutar; Soutar	Stadium: Celtic Park; Attendance: 2000; Referee: Mr McFadden (Edinburgh Hibs)

9 June 1888 Friendly	Celtic	1–0	Dundee Harp	Glasgow, Scotland
16:30 GMT	Coleman	Celtic Report	Renwick; Boyd; Unknown	Stadium: Celtic Park; Attendance: 6000; Referee: Unknown

16 June 1888 Friendly	Celtic	3–3	Mossend Swifts	Glasgow, Scotland
15:00 GMT	McLaren 25'; Gorevin 40'; McCallum 85'	Celtic Report	Renwick; Boyd; Unknown	Stadium: Celtic Park; Attendance: 4000; Referee: Unknown

23 June 1888 Friendly	Celtic	3–4	Clyde	Glasgow, Scotland
15:00 GMT	Unknown	Celtic Report	Britton; Unknown	Stadium: Celtic Park; Attendance: Unknown; Referee: Unknown

4 August 1888 Friendly	Celtic	3–2	Hibernian	Glasgow, Scotland
15:00 GMT				Stadium: Celtic Park

11 August 1888 Friendly	Airdrie	0–6	Celtic
15:00 GMT

18 August 1888 Friendly	Clyde	1–5	Celtic
15:00 GMT

22 August 1888 Friendly	Third Lanark	4–3	Celtic
15:00 GMT

23 August 1888 Friendly	Abercorn	2–4	Celtic
15:00 GMT

27 August 1888 Friendly	Northern	0–3	Celtic
15:00 GMT

3 September 1888 Friendly	Whitefield	1–5	Celtic
15:00 GMT

8 September 1888 Friendly	Celtic	3–0	Dumbarton	Glasgow, Scotland
15:00 GMT				Stadium: Celtic Park

15 September 1888 Friendly	Dumbarton	1–2	Celtic
15:00 GMT

29 September 1888 Friendly	Celtic	4–1	Airdrie	Glasgow, Scotland
15:00 GMT				Stadium: Celtic Park

8 October 1888 Friendly	Dundee Harp	1–7	Celtic
15:00 GMT

8 October 1888 Friendly	Hibernian	0–3	Celtic
15:00 GMT

29 September 1888 Friendly	Celtic	1–0	Renton	Glasgow, Scotland
15:00 GMT				Stadium: Celtic Park

1 December 1888 Friendly	Port Glasgow Athletic	2–5	Celtic
15:00 GMT

22 December 1888 Friendly	Vale of Level	1–2	Celtic
15:00 GMT

31 December 1888 Friendly	Celtic	7–1	Mitchell St Georges	Glasgow, Scotland
15:00 GMT				Stadium: Celtic Park

3 January 1889 Friendly	Celtic	6–2	Corinthians	Glasgow, Scotland
15:00 GMT				Stadium: Celtic Park

5 January 1889 Friendly	Thistle	3–2	Celtic
15:00 GMT

19 January 1889 Friendly	Morton	4–5	Celtic
15:00 GMT

26 January 1889 Friendly	Celtic	1–1	Airdrie	Glasgow, Scotland
15:00 GMT				Stadium: Celtic Park

2 February 1889 Friendly	Celtic	0–3	Third Lanark
15:00 GMT

16 February 1888 Friendly	Corinthians	3–1	Celtic
15:00 GMT

23 February 1889 Friendly	Celtic	0–3	Clydesdale Harriers	Glasgow, Scotland
15:00 GMT				Stadium: Celtic Park

2 March 1889 Friendly	Celtic	4–4	Abercorn	Glasgow, Scotland
15:00 GMT				Stadium: Celtic Park

9 March 1889 Friendly	Celtic	5–4	Hibernian	Glasgow, Scotland
15:00 GMT				Stadium: Celtic Park

23 January 1889 Friendly	Newcastle West End	3–4	Celtic
15:00 GMT

9 March 1889 Friendly	Celtic	4–1	Third Lanark	Glasgow, Scotland
15:00 GMT				Stadium: Celtic Park

6 April 1889 Friendly	Motherwell	3–8	Celtic
15:00 GMT

13 April 1889 Friendly	Cowlairs	0–1	Celtic
15:00 GMT

19 April 1889 Friendly	Bolton Wanderers	2–0	Celtic
15:00 GMT

20 April 1889 Friendly	Burnley	1–3	Celtic
15:00 GMT

22 April 1889 Friendly	Distillery	0–1	Celtic
15:00 GMT

23 April 1889 Friendly	United Belfast	2–5	Celtic
15:00 GMT

18 April 1889 Friendly	Thistle	0–2	Celtic
15:00 GMT

23 May 1889 Friendly	Celtic	5–1	Celtic
15:00 GMT

25 May 1889 Friendly	Celtic	2–1	Preston North End
15:00 GMT

=== Glasgow Cup ===
6 October 1888 Second round	Celtic	11–2	Shettelston	Glasgow
15:00 GMT		Celtic Report		Stadium: Celtic Park; Attendance: 7,000

27 October 1888 Third Round	Rangers	1–6	Celtic	Glasgow
15:00 GMT	Wilson 20'	Celtic Report	Groves 21'; Dunbar 41', 75'; Coleman 70'; Maley 72'; Kelly 85'	Stadium: Ibrox Stadium; Attendance: 4,000

17 November 1888 Semi-final	Celtic	0–2	Queens Park	Glasgow
15:00 GMT		Celtic Report	Berry 1'; Robertson 51'	Stadium: Celtic Park; Attendance: 7,000

=== Glasgow Exhibition Cup ===
1 August 1888 First-round	Abercorn	1–1	Celtic	Glasgow, Scotland
15:00 GMT		Celtic Report		Stadium: Exhibition Grounds, Kelvinside; Attendance: 4000

21 August 1888 Second-round	Celtic	3–1	Dumbarton Athletic	Glasgow, Scotland
15:00 GMT		Celtic Report		Stadium: Exhibition Grounds, Kelvinside

29 August 1888 Semi-final	Celtic	1–0	Partick Thistle	Glasgow, Scotland
15:00 GMT		Celtic Report		Stadium: Exhibition Grounds, Kelvinside

6 September 1888 Final	Celtic	0–2	Cowlairs	Glasgow, Scotland
15:00 GMT		Celtic Report		Stadium: Exhibition Grounds, Kelvinside; Attendance: 6,000

=== Scottish Cup ===
1 September 1888 First round	Celtic	5–1	Shettleston	Glasgow, Scotland
15:00 GMT		Celtic Report		Stadium: Celtic Park

22 September 1888 Second round	Celtic	8–0	Cowlairs	Glasgow, Scotland
15:00 GMT		Celtic Report		Stadium: Celtic Park

13 October 1888 Third Round	Celtic	4–1	Albion Rovers	Glasgow, Scotland
15:00 GMT		Celtic Report		Stadium: Celtic Park

3 November 1888 Fourth Round	St Bernard's	1–4	Celtic	Edinburgh, Scotland
15:00 GMT		Celtic Report		Stadium: Old Logie Green

24 Nov 1888 Fifth Round	Clyde	0–1; Replay Ordered	Celtic	Glasgow, Scotland
15:00 GMT		Celtic Report	34' Britton	Stadium: Celtic Park; Attendance: 9000

8 December 1888 Fifth Round	Celtic	9–2	Clyde	Glasgow, Scotland
15:00 GMT	6' 27' Maley; 10' McLaren; 47' McCallum; 70' Groves	Celtic Report	20' 21' Cherrie	Stadium: Celtic Park; Attendance: 9000; Referee: Mr Robertson

15 December 1888 Sixth Round	East Stirlingshire	1–2	Celtic	Falkirk, Scotland
15:00 GMT		Celtic Report		Stadium: Merchiston Park; Attendance: 3,000

12 January 1889 Semi-final	Dumbarton	1–4	Celtic	Dumbarton, Scotland
15:00 GMT		Celtic Report		Stadium: Boghead Park; Attendance: 6,000

2 February 1889 Final	Celtic	0–3; Replay Ordered	Third Lanark	Glasgow, Scotland
15:00 GMT		Celtic Report		Stadium: Hampden Park; Attendance: 13,000

9 February 1889 Final	Celtic	1–2	Third Lanark	Glasgow, Scotland
15:00 GMT		Celtic Report		Stadium: Hampden Park

=== Glasgow North Eastern Cup ===
29 Dec 1888 First round	Clydesdale	1–5	Celtic	Glasgow, Scotland
15:00 GMT	Rowan	Celtic Report	Dunbar; Maley; McCallum; Groves	Stadium: Southcroft Park; Referee: Mr T Quairus

16 March 1889 Semi-final	Celtic	4–1	Northern	Glasgow, Scotland
15:00 GMT	McLeod 10'	Celtic Report	13' Dunbar; 55' McCallum; Coleman	Stadium: Celtic Park

11 May 1889 Final	Celtic	6–1	Cowlairs	Glasgow, Scotland
15:00 GMT	Coleman 19'; Groves; Gallagher 15'; Dowds 79'; Maley 21'	Celtic Report	McPherson	Stadium: Barrowfield Park; Attendance: 8000; Referee: McPherson

=== Glasgow Merchants Charity Cup ===
4 May 1889 Semi-final	Celtic	2–5	Renton	Glasgow, Scotland
15:00 GMT	Unknown; Groves	Celtic Report	Harvie; Campbell; McCall	Stadium: Hampden Park; Attendance: 20,000; Referee: Unknown

== Squad ==
Note: Flags indicate national team as defined under FIFA eligibility rules; some limited exceptions apply. Players may hold more than one non-FIFA nationality.

No.	Pos.	Nation	Player
—	GK	SCO	Willie Dunning
—	DF	SCO	Mick McKeown
—	DF	SCO	Willie Maley
—	DF	SCO	Jas Kelly
—	DF	SCO	Jas McLaren
—	DF	IRL	Alexander Collins
—	MF	SCO	Johnny Coleman
—	MF	SCO	Mick Dunbar
—	MF	SCO	Tom Maley
—	MF	SCO	Paddy Gallagher

No.	Pos.	Nation	Player
—	MF	SCO	Neil McCallum
—	FW	SCO	Willie Groves

== Team statistics ==
=== Overall ===
Competition	Started round	Current position / round	Final position / round	First match	Last match
Scottish Cup	1st round	—	Runners-up	1 September 1888	9 February 1889

Updated to match played 21 May 2017.
Source: Competitions

== See also ==
- List of Celtic F.C. seasons
