= 1893–94 Hibernian F.C. season =

Hibernian
1893–94 season
- Scottish Second Division: 1st
- Scottish Cup: 3rd Preliminary Round
- Average home league attendance: 13,721 (down 618)

During the 1893–94 season Hibernian, a football club based in Edinburgh, finished first out of 10 clubs in the Scottish Second Division.

== Scottish Second Division ==
Match Day	Date	Opponent	H/A	Score	Hibernian Scorer(s)	Attendance
1	19 August	Thistle	A	2–1		500
2	26 August	Morton	H	9–2		1,000
3	9 September	Clyde	A	4–0		3,000
4	16 September	Abercorn	H	7–2		3,000
5	30 September	Northern	A	2–2		1,000
6	7 October	Cowlairs	H	3–4		
7	21 October	Port Glasgow Athletic	A	3–3		
8	4 November	Thistle	H	4–0		1,000
9	25 November	Motherwell	H	8–2		2,000
10	2 December	Morton	A	1–0		
11	3 February	Partick Thistle	H	6–1		4,000
12	3 March	Abercorn	A	3–3		1,000
13	10 March	Clyde	H	4–3		3,000
14	17 March	Cowlairs	A	3–2		2,000
15	31 March	Partick Thistle	A	7–1		
16	7 April	Northern	H	6–0		500
17	14 April	Motherwell	A	1–2		5,000
18	19 May	Port Glasgow Athletic	H	10–1		

=== Final League table ===
P	Team	Pld	W	D	L	GF	GA	GD	Pts
1	Hibernian	18	13	3	2	83	29	53	29
2	Cowlairs	18	13	1	4	72	32	40	27
3	Clyde	18	11	2	5	51	36	15	24

=== Scottish Cup ===
Round	Date	Opponent	H/A	Score	Hibernian Scorer(s)	Attendance
PR1	2 September	Cowdenbeath	A	1–0		
PR2	23 September	Broxburn	H	5–0		
PR3	14 October	Vale of Leven	A	0–1		

== See also ==
- List of Hibernian F.C. seasons
