= 1888 Glasgow Exhibition Cup =

Tournament details
- Country: Scotland
- Teams: 16

Final positions
- Champions: Cowlairs (1st title)
- Runners-up: Celtic
- Semifinalists: Partick Thistle; St Mirren

Tournament statistics
- Matches played: 18

The Exhibition Cup was a one-off football tournament contested in Glasgow, Scotland. Held to coincide with the International Exhibition of Science, Art and Industry, this early season competition was won by Cowlairs, beating Celtic in the final. The matches, played over the month of August 1888 with the final on 6 September, were staged at the University of Glasgow recreation grounds at Gilmorehill (today occupied by various departments of the institution such as the Kelvin Building of Physics and the Graham Kerr Building of Zoology), close to the exhibition's main site at Kelvingrove. While the tournament winners were awarded a handsome trophy, the runners up were presented with gold badges.

Although the Scottish Football League had yet to be formed, the Exhibition Cup could be considered something of a second-tier tournament, as none of the entrants had been a winner or finalist in the Scottish Cup in its first 15 years of existence. However the tournament has some historical significance for Celtic, as it was the first final the club played, having only formed a few months earlier, and their first ever defeat. The result was seen as a surprise, as Celtic had assembled a strong team of experienced players, mostly with Irish connections, from Hibernian and Renton, although Cowlairs also boosted their squad with guest players. The two teams met again a few weeks later in the second round of the 1888–89 Scottish Cup, Celtic this time winning emphatically 8–0, and went on to the final, losing to Third Lanark. Celtic also progressed to the final of the 1889 Glasgow North Eastern Cup, where they gained further revenge on Cowlairs by defeating them 6–1 to win their first trophy.

== Matches ==
=== First round ===
Team 1	Aggregate	Team 2
Abercorn	1–1	Celtic
Clyde	?	Northern
St Mirren	4–2	Dykebar
Dumbarton Athletic	2–1	Morton
Cowlairs	9–1	Thistle
Kilbirnie	1–1	Kilmarnock
Partick Thistle	5–2	Airdrieonians
Albion Rovers	4–3	East Stirlingshire

==== Replays ====
Team 1	Aggregate	Team 2
Kilmarnock	0–1	Kilbirnie
Celtic	?	Abercorn

=== Quarter-finals ===
Team 1	Aggregate	Team 2
Cowlairs	5–0	Clyde
Partick Thistle	2–1	Kilbirnie
St Mirren	1–1	Albion Rovers
Celtic	3–1	Dumbarton Athletic

==== Replays ====
Team 1	Aggregate	Team 2
Albion Rovers	0–4	St Mirren

=== Semi-finals ===
Team 1	Aggregate	Team 2
Celtic	1–0	Partick Thistle
Cowlairs	1–0	St Mirren

=== Final ===
6 September 1888

Cowlairs	2–0	Celtic
Stewart 50'; Bishop 65'	Report

University of Glasgow Recreation Grounds, Glasgow
Attendance: 6,000
Referee: J. N. Crerar

Cowlairs
Celtic

GK	Thomas Duff
RB	John McCartney
LB	William McLeod
RH	Allan Stewart (Note: Guest player – Stewart from Queen's Park, McCall from Renton.)
CH	Alexander Sinclair
LH	James McPherson
OR	Andrew Bishop
IR	Tom McInnes
CF	James Hamilton
IL	James McCall
OL	John McPherson

GK	Bill Dunning
RB	James McLaren
LB	Alec Collins
RH	Michael McKeown
CH	James Kelly
LH	Paddy Gallacher
OR	Neil McCallum
IR	Michael Dunbar
CF	Willie Groves
IL	John Coleman
OL	John O'Connor

== See also ==
- Glasgow International Exhibition Cup, similar tournament in 1901 at the same venue
- Edinburgh Exhibition Cup, similar tournament in 1908
- Empire Exhibition Trophy, similar tournament in 1938 (also featuring English clubs)
- Saint Mungo Cup, similar tournament in 1951
- Coronation Cup (football), similar tournament in 1953 (also featuring English clubs)
