= 1889–90 Celtic F.C. season =

Celtic
1889–90 season
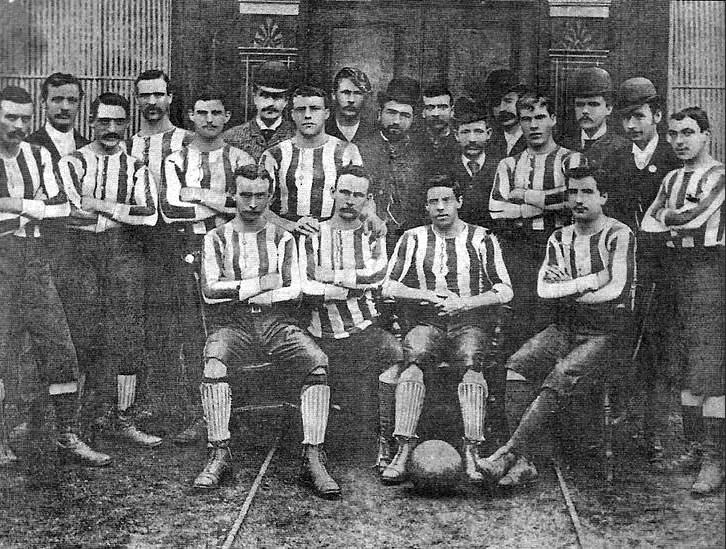
- Chairman: Dr John Conway
- Stadium: Celtic Park
- Scottish Cup: First round
- Glasgow Cup: Runners-up
- Glasgow North Eastern Cup: Winners

The 1888–89 season was the second season of football by Celtic. They competed in the Scottish Cup, Glasgow Exhibition Cup, Glasgow Merchants Charity Cup, Glasgow Cup and Glasgow North Eastern Cup, they won the latter for the second consecutive year.

== Results and fixtures ==
Win Draw Loss Postponed

=== Pre-season and friendlies ===
9 August 1889 Friendly	Glasgow Select	1–5	Celtic	Glasgow, Scotland
15:00 GMT		Celtic Report		Stadium: Benburb Park

16 August 1889 Friendly	Victoria United	0–10	Celtic	Aberdeen, Scotland
15:00 GMT		Celtic Report		Stadium: Central Park

17 August 1889 Friendly	Dundee Harp	2–5	Celtic	Dundee, Scotland
15:00 GMT		Celtic Report		Stadium: East Dock Street Park

24 August 1889 Friendly	Cambuslang	2–0	Celtic	Cambuslang, Scotland
15:00 GMT		Celtic Report		Stadium: Whitefield Park

31 August 1889 Friendly	Celtic	1–1	Dumbarton	Glasgow, Scotland
15:00 GMT		Celtic Report		Stadium: Celtic Park; Attendance: 5000

21 September 1889 Friendly	Sunderland	0–1	Celtic	Sunderland, England
15:00 GMT		Celtic Report		Stadium: Newcastle Road

28 September 1889 Friendly	Celtic	3–2	Sunderland	Glasgow, Scotland
15:00 GMT		Celtic Report		Stadium: Celtic Park

3 October 1889 Friendly	Celtic	1–0	Blackburn Rovers
15:00 GMT		Celtic Report

5 October 1889 Friendly	Celtic	1–1	Rangers
15:00 GMT		Celtic Report

12 October 1889 Friendly	Celtic	0–2	Everton
15:00 GMT		Celtic Report

19 October 1889 Friendly	St Bernards	0–3	Celtic
15:00 GMT		Celtic Report

26 October 1889 Friendly	5th KRV	0–3	Celtic
15:00 GMT		Celtic Report

9 November 1889 Friendly	Celtic	2–0	Cowlairs
15:00 GMT		Celtic Report

16 November 1889 Friendly	Celtic	7–1	Hibernian
15:00 GMT		Celtic Report

23 November 1889 Friendly	Celtic	2–2	Dumbarton
15:00 GMT		Celtic Report

21 December 1889 Friendly	Sunderland	1–2	Celtic
15:00 GMT		Celtic Report

28 December 1889 Friendly	Celtic	1–6	Cowlairs
15:00 GMT		Celtic Report

1 January 1890 Friendly	Celtic	3–2	Everton
15:00 GMT		Celtic Report

4 January 1890 Friendly	Celtic	7–0	Heart of Midlothian
15:00 GMT		Celtic Report

11 January 1890 Friendly	Celtic	1–0	St. Mirren
15:00 GMT		Celtic Report

8 February 1890 Friendly	Heart of Midlothian	1–0	Celtic
15:00 GMT		Celtic Report

22 February 1890 Friendly	Mitchell St Georges	5–2	Celtic
15:00 GMT		Celtic Report

8 March 1890 Friendly	Celtic	4–1	Motherwell
15:00 GMT		Celtic Report

22 March 1890 Friendly	Celtic	3–2	Vale of Leven
15:00 GMT		Celtic Report

29 March 1890 Friendly	Celtic	4–2	Third Lanark
15:00 GMT		Celtic Report

4 April 1890 Friendly	Bolton Wanderers	4–0	Celtic
15:00 GMT		Celtic Report

5 April 1890 Friendly	Everton	3–1	Celtic
15:00 GMT		Celtic Report

7 April 1890 Friendly	Blackburn Rovers	1–1	Celtic
15:00 GMT		Celtic Report

8 April 1890 Friendly	Distillery	1–6	Celtic
15:00 GMT		Celtic Report

12 April 1890 Friendly	Celtic	1–1	Notts County
15:00 GMT		Celtic Report

3 May 1890 Friendly	Heart of Midlothian	1–2	Celtic
15:00 GMT		Celtic Report

10 May 1890 Friendly	Celtic	2–2	Bolton Wanderers
15:00 GMT		Celtic Report

17 May 1890 Friendly	Celtic	4–2	Wolverhampton Wanderers
15:00 GMT		Celtic Report

22 May 1890 Friendly	Celtic	1–0	Preston North End
15:00 GMT		Celtic Report

24 May 1890 Friendly	Celtic	2–4	Third Lanark
15:00 GMT		Celtic Report

27 May 1890 Friendly	St. Mirren	0–2	Celtic
15:00 GMT		Celtic Report

31 May 1890 Friendly	Celtic	2–2	Old Renton
15:00 GMT		Celtic Report

=== Scottish Cup ===
7 September 1889 First round (Note: Rearranged game after abandoned) (Note: Match abandoned due to crowd encroachment)	Celtic	0–0	Queens Park	Glasgow, Scotland
15:00 GMT		Celtic Report		Stadium: Celtic Park; Attendance: 16,000

14 September 1889 First round	Queens Park	2–1	Celtic	Glasgow, Scotland
15:00 GMT		Celtic Report		Stadium: Hampden Park; Attendance: 11,000

=== Glasgow Cup ===
2 November 1889 Glasgow Cup	Celtic	5–1	United Abstainers
15:00 GMT		Celtic Report

30 November 1889 Glasgow Cup	Celtic	4–1	Cambuslang
15:00 GMT		Celtic Report

14 December 1889 Glasgow Cup	Celtic	2–3	Queens Park
15:00 GMT		Celtic Report

=== Glasgow Merchants Charity Cup ===
19 April 1890 Semi-final	Celtic	0–2	Third Lanark
15:00 GMT		Celtic Report

=== Glasgow North Eastern Cup ===
7 December 1889 First round	Celtic	5–0	Clydesdale
15:00 GMT		Celtic Report

18 January 1890 Second round	Celtic	1–1	Cowlairs
15:00 GMT		Celtic Report

25 January 1890 Second round	Cowlairs	0–5	Celtic
15:00 GMT		Celtic Report

15 February 1890 Semi-final	Thistle	0–5	Celtic
15:00 GMT		Celtic Report

15 March 1890 Final	Celtic	2–0	Northern
15:00 GMT		Celtic Report

=== Rangers & Clydesdale Harriers Sports Cup ===
3 August 1889 Semi-final	Celtic	2–0	Renton	Glasgow, Scotland
15:00 GMT		Celtic Report		Stadium: Ibrox Park; Attendance: 6000

6 August 1889 Final	Rangers	0–2	Celtic	Glasgow, Scotland
15:00 GMT		Celtic Report		Stadium: Ibrox Park; Attendance: 4000
