= 1887–88 Dumbarton F.C. season =

Dumbarton
1887–88 season
- Stadium: Boghead Park, Dumbarton
- Scottish Cup: Second Round
Home colours

The 1887–88 season was the 15th Scottish football season in which Dumbarton competed at a national level.

== Scottish Cup ==
Following an easy first round victory, Dumbarton were knocked out of the Scottish Cup at the second round stage by their old rivals Vale of Leven.

1 September 1887 Cup round 1	Dumbarton	10–0	Dunbritton	Boghead Park
	Goal			Attendance: 3,500

24 September 1887 Cup round 1	Dumbarton	1–5	Vale of Leven	Boghead Park
	Aitken 42'		10'; Cowan 45' scrimmage 70'	Attendance: 3,000; Referee: T Park

== Dumbartonshire Cup ==
Following an easy win in the second round, Dumbarton lost to Renton in the third round.

19 November 1887 Round 2	Dumbarton	9-0	Methlan Park	Boghead Park
	Goal

10 December 1887 Round 3	Renton	1-0	Dumbarton	Tontine Park
	McCall

== Glasgow Charity Cup ==
A good win was achieved in the first round against 3rd LRV, but Cambuslang were to prove too strong in the semi-final replay, after a 1–1 draw.

25 April 1888 First Round	Dumbarton	5–0	3rd LRV	Cathkin Park
	scrimmage Madden; Lapsley			Attendance: 2,000; Referee: Mr McFadden

4 May 1888 Semi-final	Cambuslang	1–1	Dumbarton	Cathkin Park
	scrimmage		Aitken	Attendance: 2,000

9 May 1888 Semi-final replay	Cambuslang	3–0	Dumbarton	Cathkin Park
	Buchanan; Smith; Tate (o.g.)			Attendance: 1,000; Referee: Mr Watt

== Friendlies ==
Dumbarton's fixture list during the season grew to its largest so far with 43 'friendly' matches being played. This included home and away ties against Rangers, Hibernian, Vale of Leven, Partick Thistle, Morton, Port Glasgow and 3rd LRV, a match against Renfrewshire Cup holders Abercorn, and a 4 match tour of the north of Scotland during the New Year holidays. In addition 6 matches were played against English opposition with mixed results. In all, 23 were won, 4 drawn and 16 lost, scoring 134 goals and conceding 98.

13 August 1887 Friendly	Dundee Wanderers	1–5	Dumbarton	Morgan Park, Dundee
	Goal		Goal

20 August 1887 Friendly	St Bernard's	5–4	Dumbarton	Powderhall
	Boyd 5'; Heggie scrimmage Campbell		Gibson (o.g.); Robertson; Jamieson	Referee: J Muirhead

23 August 1887 Friendly	Shettleston	1–2	Dumbarton	Carntyne Park, Glasgow
	Reid		Keir 55', 65'

25 August 1887 Friendly	Dumbarton	5–1	Northern	Boghead Park
	Bell; Low; Lapsley; Jamieson		Goal

27 August 1887 Friendly	Queen's Park	5–3	Dumbarton	Hampden Park
	scrimmage 35'; Hamilton 40', 65'; Berry; Harvie		Aitken 15'; Jamieson 20'; Bell	Attendance: 4,000; Referee: Mr McCulloch

3 September 1887 Friendly	Dumbarton	8–1	Mauchline	Boghead Park
	Bell; Mair; Lapsley; Jamieson		Goal

10 September 1887 Friendly	Dumbarton	4–2	Hibernian	Boghead Park
	Jamieson 1'; Bell 2'; Lowe 45'; Aitken 55'		McGhee 15'; Groves 20'	Attendance: 3,000; Referee: Mr Boag

17 September 1887 Friendly	Rangers	2–3	Dumbarton	Ibrox Park
	scrimmage 18'; Lawrie 85'		Jamieson 10'; Aitken; Lapsley	Attendance: 1,000

1 October 1887 Friendly	Dumbarton	7–2	Albion Rovers	Boghead Park
	Aitken; Bell; Low; Lindsay		Tate	Attendance: 1,000

8 October 1887 Friendly	Dumbarton	2–2	(England) Blackburn Rovers	Boghead Park
	Aitken 85', 90'		Chadwick 15', 86'	Attendance: 2,000; Referee: J Boag

15 October 1887 Friendly	Partick Thistle	4–3	Dumbarton	Whiteinch, Glasgow
	Buchanan 20'; Paul 44'; Stewart; Marshall 80'		Jamieson 30', 82'; Aitken 50'	Attendance: 2,000

22 October 1887 Friendly	Motherwell	1–1	Dumbarton	Roman Road, Motherwell
	McPherson 42'		Goal

29 October 1887 Friendly	Dumbarton	8–1	Athenians	Boghead Park
	Mair 15' scrimmage Jamieson; Bell; Aitken; Lapsley		Chadwick

5 November 1887 Friendly	Clyde	1–2	Dumbarton	Barrowfield Park
	Finlay 70'		Jamieson	Attendance: 2,000

12 November 1887 Friendly	Dumbarton	2–2	Vale of Leven	Boghead Park
	Dewar 70'; 90'		8'; McLaren 60'	Attendance: 2,000

3 December 1887 Friendly	Dumbarton	0–4	Morton	Boghead Park
			5'; 10'; 60'

17 December 1887 Friendly	Morton	0–5	Dumbarton	Cappielow Park
			Aitken 20'; Bell; Dewar 50'	Referee: Mr Walker

24 December 1887 Friendly	Dumbarton	4–0	Port Glasgow	Boghead Park
	10'; 50'; 55'

31 December 1887 Friendly	Dundee Wanderers	4–5	Dumbarton	Morgan Park, Dundee
	Cooper; Hendry		Dewar; Lapsley Tosh (o.g.)	Attendance: 2,000

2 January 1888 Friendly	Arbroath	2–3	Dumbarton	Gayfield Park
	Crawford		Lapsley; Low

3 January 1888 Friendly	Montrose	1–5	Dumbarton	Links Park
	Goal		Liddell; McIntosh (o.g.)

4 January 1888 Friendly	Aberdeen	3–12	Dumbarton	Recreation Grounds, Aberdeen
	(o.g.); Lumsden; Clark		Bell 15'; Aitken 18'; Barr scrimmage Lowe; Dewar

7 January 1888 Friendly	Hibernian	5–1	Dumbarton	Easter Road
	Coleman; Gorevin; Groves		Bell 80'

14 January 1888 Friendly	Clyde	3–1	Dumbarton	Barrowfield Park
	Cherry Cochrane		Dewar

21 January 1888 Friendly	St Mirren	1–0	Dumbarton	Westmarch (stadium)
	Morton

4 February 1888 Friendly	Dumbarton	5–0	Cowlairs	Boghead Park
	Bell 20'; Madden; Aitken 49'; Dewar			Attendance: 1,500

11 February 1888 Friendly	3rd LRV	2–1	Dumbarton	Cathkin Park (1872–1903)
	McIntyre; Stark 45'		Lapsley	Attendance: 1,000

18 February 1888 Friendly	Dumbarton	3–1	3rd LRV	Boghead Park
	Galbraith; McMillan 46'; Lapsley 51'		Mailey 20'

25 February 1888 Friendly	Kings Park	2–4	Dumbarton	Laurelhill Park, Stirling
	Ferguson		Lapsley 65', 75'; McMillan; Dewar

3 March 1888 Friendly	Vale of Leven	1–3	Dumbarton	Alexandria
	Forbes 7'		Bell 55', 60'	Attendance: 4,000

10 March 1888 Friendly	Dumbarton	4–4	Rangers	Boghead Park
	Bell 1'; Dewar 12'; Aitken 56', 80'		18' scrimmage 30' 71'	Attendance: 3,000

22 March 1888 Friendly	Montrose	3–4	Dumbarton	Links Park
	Goal		Goal	Attendance: 2,500

24 March 1888 Friendly	Grangemouth	1–3	Dumbarton	Muirhead Park, Grangemouth
	scrimmage		Goal

30 March 1888 Friendly	(England) Preston North End	7–0	Dumbarton	Deepdale
	Gordon 10', 15', 80'; Dewhurst; Ross; 55'; Drummond 83'			Attendance: 7,000; Referee: Mr Brownlow

31 March 1888 Friendly	(England) Burnley	1–2	Dumbarton	Turf Moor
	McCrae 55'		Lowe 2'; 30'	Attendance: 5,000

2 April 1888 Friendly	(England) Blackburn Rovers	2–1	Dumbarton	Leamington Road
	Chadwick 4'; Rushton		Lapsley	Attendance: 6,000

7 April 1888 Friendly	Queen's Park	6–2	Dumbarton	Hampden Park
	Hamilton, J 15'; Auld; Allan 45'; Berry; Gray; Hamilton, A		scrimmage Madden	Attendance: 2,000

14 April 1888 Friendly	Cowlairs	2–0	Dumbarton	Gourlay Park, Cowlairs
	Binks 44'; 89'			Attendance: 1,000

21 April 1888 Friendly	Dumbarton	1–2	Partick Thistle	Boghead Park
	Low 45'		Suter

24 April 1888 Friendly	Dumbarton	3–0	Union (Dumbarton)	Boghead Park
	Goal

27 April 1888 Friendly	Dumbarton	0–1	(England) Preston North End	Boghead Park
			Goodall	Attendance: 4,000

28 April 1888 Friendly	Hearts	1–2	Dumbarton	Tynecastle Stadium
	Sneddon		Dewar	Referee: J Boag

5 May 1888 Friendly	Abercorn	3–2	Dumbarton	Recreation Grounds, Paisley
	Allison scrimmage		Low 50'

19 May 1888 Friendly	Port Glasgow	5–2	Dumbarton	Clune Park, Port Glasgow
	Brown 5'; Neill		Goal

== Player statistics ==
Of note amongst those donning the club's colours for the first time were Duncan Stewart and John Bell.
At the same time the club's squad was depleted by the loss four internationalists:
- Robert 'Plumber' Brown and Joe Lindsay moved to local rivals Dumbarton Athletic. James McAulay emigrated to Burma and Billy Robertson also heading for 'pastures new'.
In addition after returning from a short spell with Bolton Wanderers, Jock Hutcheson left the club for the final time.

Only includes appearances and goals in competitive Scottish Cup matches.

Player	Position	Appearances	Goals
(Scotland) McLuskie	GK	2	0
(Scotland) R D Hunter	DF	2	0
(Scotland) Duncan Stewart	DF	2	0
(Scotland) J Dennett	MF	1	0
(Scotland) Leitch Keir	MF	2	0
(Scotland) McNee	MF	1	0
(Scotland) Peter Miller	MF	2	0
(Scotland) Ralph Aitken	FW	1	1
(Scotland) Jack Bell	FW	2	0
(Scotland) R Jamieson	FW	2	0
(Scotland) William Lapsley	FW	2	0
(Scotland) J Low	FW	2	0
(Scotland) Hugh Mair	FW	1	0

=== International caps ===
An international trial match was played on 18 February 1888 to consider selection of teams to represent Scotland in the upcoming games in the 1888 British Home Championship. Leitch Keir was selected to take part.

Subsequently, four Dumbarton players were selected to play for Scotland as follows:

- Geordie Dewar and Duncan Stewart earned their first caps and Ralph Aitken earned his second cap against Ireland. Both Dewar and Aitken scored in the 10–2 win over the Irish.

- Leitch Keir earned his fifth cap against England.

=== Representative matches ===
Dumbarton players were selected to play in Dumbartonshire county XI's as follows:

Date	Opponent	Result	Players (Goals)
22 October 1887	Lancashire	4-1	Jamieson (1); Keir; Stewart
28 January 1888	Edinburgh	4-1	Aitken (1); Bell (2); Dewar; Hunter
28 January 1888	Renfrewshire	2-1	Lapsley; McMillan
25 March 1888	Lanarkshire	1-4	Low

In addition:

- Leitch Keir was selected to play in a Scots Anglo XI against a Scots Welsh XI on 26 May 1888. The 'English' XI won 4–3.

- Geordie Dewar was selected to play in a Scottish Internationalists XI against Perthshire and Aberdeenshire on 20 and 21 April respectively.

== Reserve team ==
Dumbarton were defeated in the second round of the Scottish Second XI Cup by Vale of Leven.

In the Dumbartonshire Second XI Cup competition, Dumbarton lost out in the semi-final to Renton.
