= Airdrie F.C. (disambiguation) =

Airdrie F.C. may refer to the following Scottish association football clubs based in or around the town of Airdrie, North Lanarkshire:

- Airdrie F.C., a defunct club that competed in the Scottish Cup between 1875 and 1884
- Airdrie Bluebell F.C., a supposed football club which was part of the first round draw for the 1880–81 Scottish Cup, but which was an erroneous duplication of the Plains Blue Bell F.C. entry;
- Airdriehill F.C. (1879), a defunct club from Airdriehill that competed between 1879 and 1883
- Airdriehill F.C., a defunct club from Airdriehill that entered the Scottish Cup between 1884 and 1898
- Airdrieonians F.C. (1878), a defunct club, commonly known as Airdrie, that existed between 1878 and 2002
- Airdrieonians F.C. (known as Airdrie United between 2002 and 2013), a successor club to the original Airdrieonians
