= 1878–79 Morton F.C. season =

Morton
1878–79 season
- Scottish Cup: First round (lost to Busby)

The 1878–79 season was Morton Football Club's second season in which they competed at a national level, entering the sixth Scottish Cup.

== Fixtures and results ==
Win Draw Loss Postponed

=== Scottish Cup ===
28 September 1878 First Round	Busby	3 – 1	Morton	Overlee Park
	,,		Goal

=== Friendlies ===
1 August 1878 Friendly	Morton	2 – 1	Wellington Park	Garvel Park
	,		Goal

7 September 1878 Friendly	Morton	1 – 1	Barrhead	Garvel Park
	Goal		Goal

14 September 1878 Friendly	Possil Park	0 – 2	Morton	Saracen Park
			,

16 November 1878 Friendly	Union	5 – 0	Morton	Queen's Park
	,,,,	Played on a public park.

17 May 1879 Friendly	Morton	0 – 3	Wellington Park	Cappielow Park^{[note 1]}
			Thomson; Blake; Richmond

1. Game was played "on a field behind Cappielow Sugar Refinery".
