= Petershill F.C. (1877) =

Former association football club in Scotland

Petershill
- Full name: Petershill Football Club
- Founded: 1877
- Dissolved: 1883
- Ground: Germiston Park
- Hon. Secretary: James Duncan
- Match Secretary: Wm. C Dean
Home colours

Petershill Football Club was a 19th-century football club from the Springburn area of Glasgow in Scotland.

== History ==
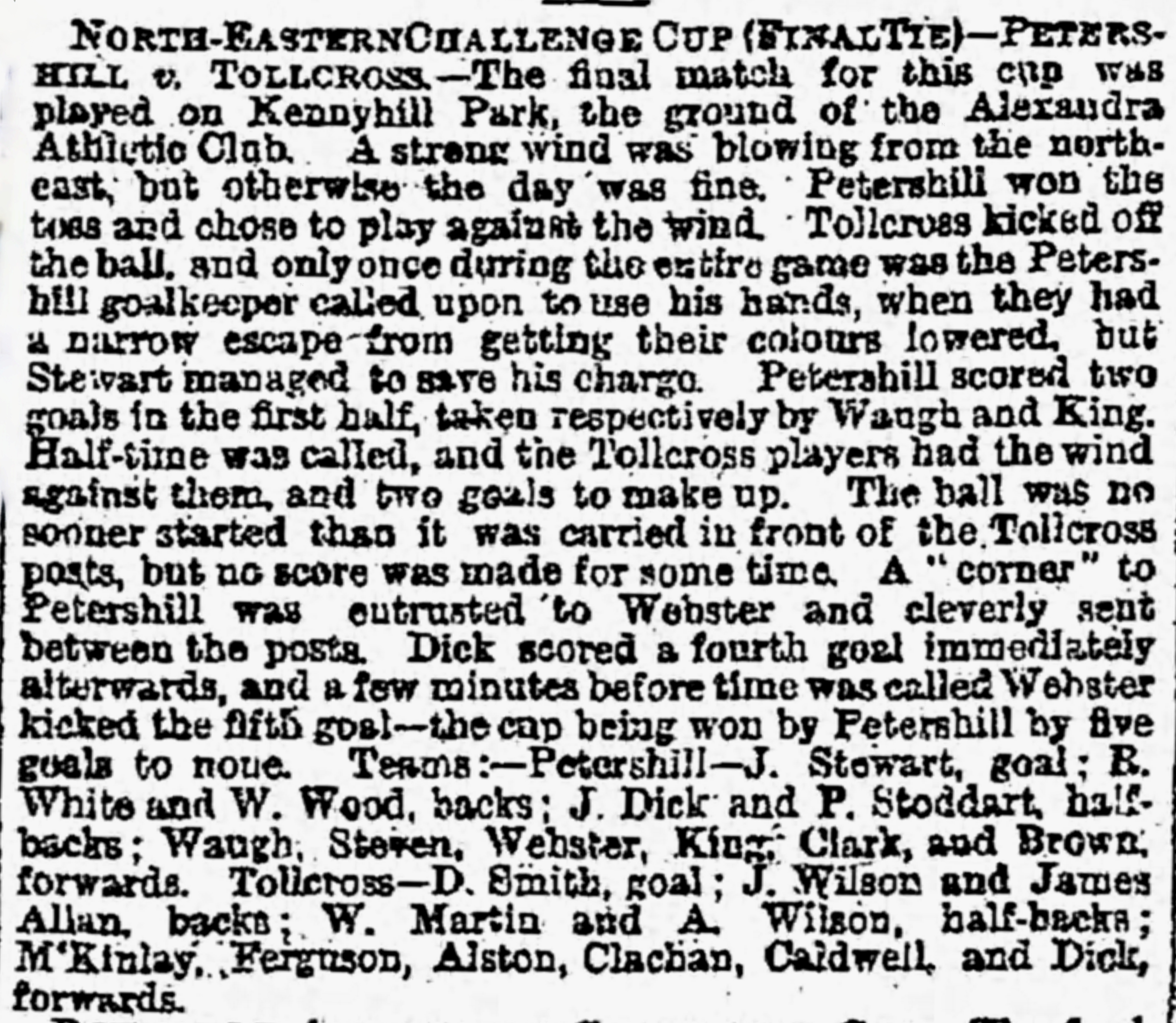
Report of Petershill winning the Glasgow North Eastern Cup, 1882

The club was formed in 1877 in Springburn, an area that was growing rapidly due to its importance to Glasgow's railway industry, and promptly joined the Scottish Football Association.

Petershill was an active if unsuccessful club, entering the Scottish Cup every season from 1877–78 to 1882–83, but it only won two ties. In 1878–79 Petershill beat Albatross in the first round; in the second, the club lost 4–1 at South Western, with one South Western goal being disallowed and the Petershill one being awarded after a protest. Petershill successfully protested the defeat, to no avail - the S.W. showed no mercy and inflicted an 8–0 defeat on the side, its record Cup loss.

Its other successful tie was in 1881–82, with a 3–1 win at Pollokshields Athletic. Petershill drew a bye into the third round, and drew 2–2 with Partick Thistle in the first tie. Thistle won the replay 2–0, but Petershill successfully protested on the basis that "three horses broke through the ropes" and "not only interfered with the game, but threatened to molest the players". At the third time of asking, Petershill took a 2–1 half-time lead, but lost 3–2; unusually, the Scottish FA had insisted on the tie being concluded, and the match went to extra-time.

That season, the club was one of the most active in Glasgow, having played 32 matches over the preceding season. The club even finished the 1881–82 season with its only triumph, winning the first North-Eastern Cup (for clubs in north-east Glasgow) with a 5–0 win over Tollcross in the final at Kennyhill Park.

However the club did not survive the 1882–83 season, its last known fixture being a 5–2 defeat at Thistle in the first round of the North-Eastern Cup in March 1883; the club had borrowed some of the geographically inappropriate South Western players to strengthen the side for the tie. At the conclusion of the season, many of the Petershill members decamped to fellow Springburn side Northern, the two effectively amalgamating. Petershill was formally removed from the SFA member roll in August 1883. The name was revived by a Junior side in 1897.

== Colours ==
Petershill wore blue and black hoops.

== Ground ==
The club had a nomadic existence in the Springburn area, and played at the following grounds:

- 1877–78: Avenue Park
- 1878–79: Keppochhill Park
- 1879–80: Petershill Park
- 1880–83: Germiston Park on Petershill Road

== Honours ==
- Glasgow North Eastern Cup
  - Winners: 1881–82
