= Tollcross F.C. =

Association football club in Glasgow City, Scotland

Tollcross
- Full name: Tollcross Football Club
- Founded: 1879
- Dissolved: 1888
- Ground: various (see below)
- President: Mr Cherrie
- Secretary: Wm. Walter Oldfield, Alex Dick Jr.
1879–84 colours	1886–88 colours

Tollcross Football Club was a 19th-century football club from Tollcross, in the east end of Glasgow.

== History ==
The club was founded in 1879, under the name Tollcross Athletic. The club changed its name in 1883 to Tollcross.

=== Scottish Cup entries ===
Tollcross entered the Scottish Cup from 1880–81 to 1887–88, apart from 1882 to 1883 when the club was mostly inactive. The club only won two ties, but twice reached the third round, thanks to disqualifications to other sides.

Its first win in the competition came in 1883–84, when beating Airdrie in a replay; Tollcross lost the original tie 1–0, but, in what would become a theme, protested, on the basis that the touchlines were not "discernable"; the Scottish Football Association agreed switched the tie to Tollcross. Tollcross came from 2–1 down at half-time to bring the scores level at 3–3, and in the second period of extra-time, Tollcross scored the winner "amidst great cheering and excitement".

The first time Tollcross reached the third round was in 1885–86, thanks to a 4–2 win at Clydesdale of Rutherglen, and a successful protest against Dykehead's win in the second round, on the basis that not one of the Dykehead players had been registered. In the third, the club visited Airdrieonians, originally to general apathy as the tie was considered almost a walkover for the home side, but Tollcross caused a stir by coming from 2–0 down to equalize the tie; however the Onians soon pulled away, the score being 4–2 at half-time and 8–2 by the end.

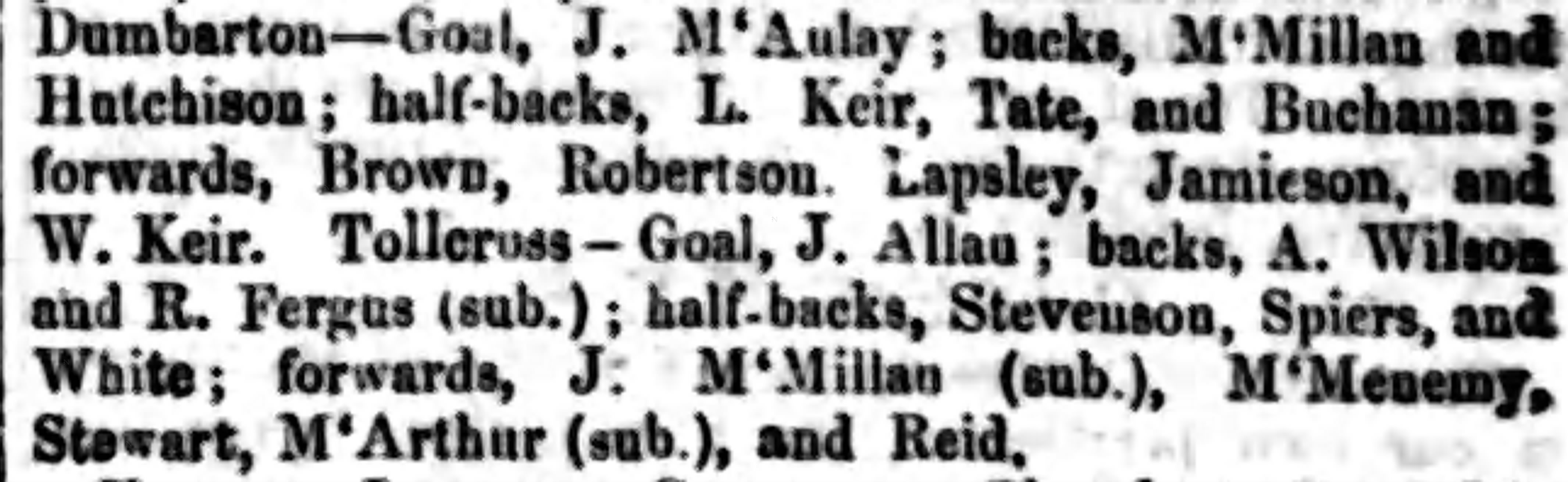
The teams for the Dumbarton v Tollcross friendly, played in lieu of the 1886–87 Cup tie

The following season the club made the third round again. Once more it won on a protest about the non-registration of players, this time against Royal Albert in the first round, and drew a bye from the second. The prospect of an away tie with eventual finalists Dumbarton in the third proved too much for some of the Tollcross side, as only eight players turned up, so the club scratched from the tie. As 1,000 spectators had also turned up, Dumbarton lent Tollcross three reserves, so the clubs could play out a friendly, which a showboating Dumbarton won 6–1.

=== Lanarkshire Cup ===
Although a Glasgow club, Tollcross was more active against teams in Lanarkshire than in the city, and played in the Lanarkshire Cup in 1880–81 and from 1883–84 to 1886–87. It lost every tie it played, including a defeat to West Benhar in 1884–85 that was given as 14–2 or 15–2.

The club's most notable tie was a first round defeat to Airdrieonians in 1885–86, the tie played a week after the FA Cup tie between the sides, and Tollcross' unexpected moxie in the tie encouraging a larger than expected crowd of 800 to attend; however this time Airdrieonians scored eight without reply. Nevertheless, Tollcross protested against four of the Onians players as not being "local" within the meaning of the competition rules, as they had been brought over from West Benhar, 16 miles from Airdrie; Airdrieonians claiming "local" in this instance meant the county, not the club. On the casting vote of the chairman (William Macintyre of Drumpellier) the Lanarkshire FA ordered a replay to take place, this time at Tollcross.

The decision was not popular, with even the Tollcross representative, Mr M'Nish, embarrassed about the grounds of the protest, and concerned that half of his team may fall foul of such a strict interpretation. Rather than prove the point by replaying the tie without the four players, Airdrieonians took the matter further, and a flurry of meetings took place within the Association, as well as within member clubs (including Drumpellier voting confidence in Mr Macintyre). Eventually the Lanarkshire FA voted to overturn its previous decision and dismiss the protest, thanks to the evidence of former LFA president Mr Dyer who confirmed that the rule was aimed at stopping importation of players from Glasgow, rather than within the shire.

=== North Eastern Cup win ===
The club did enjoy one success in local competition, winning the North Eastern Cup for clubs in Glasgow in 1886–87; although the competition was by now attracting very few entrants, four would join the Scottish League in future seasons. Tollcross beat Shettleston in the semi-final to meet Cowlairs in the final, at Northern's Hyde Park ground; however Cowlairs did not turn up, as it was playing a more lucrative friendly against Partick Thistle on the day of the final, so Tollcross won by default. Legend had it that Tollcross, tasked with kicking off and putting the ball through the posts, somehow missed.

=== End of the club ===
The cup win may have been the club's last appearance; there are no matches recorded for the club afterwards. It evidently struggled with consistency, never staying at a ground for more than three years, and changing colours radically twice. It reached its peak membership of 100 in 1885, but its membership had nearly halved the following season, with nearby Shettleston's rising in concert, despite the clubs' rivalry - the Tollcross supporters turned up to a Shettleston friendly against King's Park in March 1887 to cheer on the visitors. Its last manifestation was its entry to the 1887–88 Scottish Cup, scratching before the first round, and the club was formally struck from the membership roll of the Association before the 1888–89 season.

== Colours ==
The club originally played in blue jerseys and white knickers. In 1884 it changed to scarlet jerseys, and in 1885 was one of the first clubs to don vertical stripes, Tollcross' schema being black and gold, with white knickers; however the following season the club changed the design to hoops, possibly because of the expense of supply.

== Grounds ==
The club had a nomadic existence in the east end of Glasgow:

- 1879–81: Helenvale Park, formerly the home of the Albatross club
- 1881–83: High Belvidere, previously occupied by Blackfriars
- 1883–84, Wellshot Park, Shettleston
- 1884–86: Main's Park, 2 minutes' walk from Carmyle railway station
- 1886–88: German's Park

At the start of the 1886–87 season, the club was without a ground, which forced it to cede home advantage in its Cup tie with Royal Albert.
