= Robert Calderwood =

Scottish footballer

Personal information
- Full name: Robert Calderwood
- Date of birth: 4 October 1862
- Place of birth: Busby, Scotland
- Date of death: 13 May 1939 (aged 76)
- Place of death: Busby, Scotland
- Positions: Outside left; centre forward

Senior career*
Years	Team	Apps	(Gls)
1879–1882	Cartvale		
1882–1883	Paisley Athletic		
1883–1886	Cartvale		
1886–1887	Cowlairs		
1887	Bootle		
1889–1890	Cowlairs		
1890–1891	Newcastle West End		
1891–1892	Thistle		
1892–1894	Cartvale		

International career
1885	Scotland	3	(3 (Note: The SFA website and London Hearts website credit Calderwood with two goals against Wales; Andy Mitchell's book and John Litster's files assign the first of these to William Anderson.))
- * Club domestic league appearances and goals

Robert Calderwood (4 October 1862 – 13 May 1939) was a Scottish footballer who played as an outside left or centre forward for Cartvale (1878 club), Cowlairs, Bootle, Newcastle West End, Thistle, Cartvale (1892 club) and Scotland.

Calderwood scored three goals for Scotland in the 1884–85 British Home Championship. He was later suspended for two years by the Scottish Football Association . The suspension was imposed because he was judged to have become a professional after signing for English club Bootle. This came to light after he made an appearance for Cowlairs in the (amateur-only) 1887–88 Scottish Cup, despite having already turned professional. He returned to play at a high level after this suspension.
