= 1893–94 Scottish Division Two =

Scottish Division Two
- Season: 1893–94
- Champions: Hibernian
- Promoted: Clyde

The 1893–94 Scottish Division Two was the first season of play in the Scottish Football League Division Two.

It was won by Hibernian, with Thistle finishing bottom.

== Table ==
Pos	Team	Pld	W	D	L	GF	GA	GD	Pts	Qualification or relegation
1	Hibernian (C)	18	13	3	2	83	29	+54	29	
2	Cowlairs	18	13	1	4	72	32	+40	27	
3	Clyde (P)	18	11	2	5	51	36	+15	24	Elected to 1894–95 Scottish Division One
4	Motherwell	18	11	1	6	61	46	+15	23	
5	Partick Thistle	18	10	0	8	56	58	−2	20	
6	Port Glasgow Athletic	18	9	2	7	52	52	0	13 (Note: Port Glasgow Athletic were deducted 7 points for fielding an ineligible player.)	
7	Abercorn	18	5	2	11	42	60	−18	12	
8	Morton	18	4	1	13	36	62	−26	9	Re-elected
8	Northern	18	3	3	12	29	66	−37	9	Not re-elected (Note: Northern were not re-elected and Thistle did not apply for re-election. Dundee Wanderers and Airdrieonians were elected in their place.)
10	Thistle	18	2	3	13	31	72	−41	7	Did not apply for re-election

Updated to match(es) played on May 2013. Source: statto.com, SFHA
Rules for classification: Teams finish equal if level on points. Points system: 2 points for a win, 1 point for a draw, 0 points for a loss.
(C) Champions; (P) Promoted
