= Glasgow Hibernian F.C. =

Former association football club in Scotland

Glasgow Hibernian
- Full name: Glasgow Hibernian F.C.
- Founded: 1889
- Dissolved: 1890
- Ground: Hibernian Park; Oatlands; Glasgow
- Secretary: R. McNair
Home colours

Glasgow Hibernian Football Club was a football club based in Glasgow, Scotland which existed for little over a year between 1889 and 1890.

== History ==
=== Formation ===
The club was formed as a breakaway from Celtic F.C., which itself had only existed for under two years. One of the founders of Celtic and its first vice-president, cooperage-owning businessman and Irish nationalist James Quillan, engaged in public disputes via newspapers with other committee members in spring 1889, and again at the club's AGM in June of that year over various points in order to gather support for his alternative vision of a charitable sporting society with membership limited to persons of an Irish and Catholic background, for the benefit of that generally very poor and marginalised immigrant community in Glaswegian society. Celtic had a similar ethos but accepted members and players of all backgrounds (although in their first year they had an all-Catholic team) and under the stewardship of John Glass were already being run on a more commercial basis than some members desired, including making financial inducements to players in the supposedly amateur game in Scotland. Local churches associated with Celtic were also said to be exasperated at the drunken disorderly behaviour of some of the team's followers, and Quillan's group sought to align themselves to the temperance movement, although the fact that some of their meetings were held in pubs casts doubt on the whether the stated desire to distance their new club from alcohol was genuine.

With Quillan having been voted out of the Celtic committee, his associates turned to the original Hibernian F.C. based in Edinburgh – which had formed the blueprint for the creation of Celtic, had offered financial support but then been damaged badly by the Glasgow club enticing their players away to the new enterprise, and at that time maintained the selective membership policy Quillan sought to emulate – and attempted unsuccessfully to persuade their owners to relocate to Glasgow. In the summer of 1889 the 'malcontents' thereafter formed a new club, Glasgow Hibernian the name of a defunct team which in 1885 was part of the inspiration to create a Glasgow version of the original Hibernian, and was a proposed title for Celtic rejected by founder Brother Walfrid to avoid confusion with the Edinburgh team.

=== Results ===
With the wary Edinburgh Hibernian having rebuffed a proposal to act as opponent in their inaugural match, Glasgow Hibernian first entered the Scottish Cup for the 1889–90 season, but despite having assembled a team of a decent standard through loan arrangements (including Jim Cassidy, John Cunningham, Lewis Campbell, Willie Naughton, Jerry Reynolds and Willie Dunning who all went on to play professionally in England) lost 3–1 at home to Thistle F.C. from nearby Dalmarnock in the first round, watched by 500 spectators. They fared little better in the Glasgow Cup, being drawn against the leading club of the era, Queen's Park, in the opening round and suffering a 4–0 defeat at home. The 4,000 attendance for that match would have been particularly disappointing to the owners who had hoped (and budgeted accordingly) to attract a greater number of fans from the local area, as Celtic had done as soon as they began playing matches – in contrast to Hibernian's crowd, Queen's Park's meeting with Celtic two weeks earlier drew 22,000 spectators to the first Celtic Park followed by 10,000 to the second Hampden for a replay even with prices increased to keep spectator numbers down to manageable levels.

The early cup exits left only sporadic friendlies to occupy the club until the next season, including one against Heart of Midlothian and two against Partick Thistle. In February 1890, Hibernian Park was the venue for the Scotland Junior international team's first match against Northern Ireland Juniors, the Scots winning 11–0.

In the 1890–91 Scottish Cup first round, Hibernian overcame Kelvinside Athletic 5–1 in a replay, but then lost 4–1 away to Wishaw Thistle. The Glasgow Cup appeared to have brought a more favourable draw than the previous year, but Hibernian again failed to progress as they were eliminated by Summerton Athletic from Govan (who had been beaten 11–0 by Queen's Park at the same stage in 1889) in a replay after a 2–2 draw at home.

=== Collapse ===
Within a few weeks of the Summerton defeat, the Glasgow Hibernian club was dissolved in late October 1890 with no prospect of matchday income in the near future and outstanding debts. A court order was brought against James Quillan the following year by the club's former secretary (a wood merchant who was owed money, presumably for the construction of the stadium) as the only individual identified in its paperwork as a 'promoter', although his involvement while the team was in operation was not widely known or publicised (he was still a club member at Celtic, and later returned to active involvement with the Parkhead club before his death in 1901).

== Colours ==
The club originally wore green jerseys and black knickers, and in its last season it wore green and maroon vertically striped shirts.

== Ground ==
Funds of £500 were provided to build a new ground, which they named Hibernian Park (again aping the Edinburgh Hibs' home of the time), on the south bank of the River Clyde near to the Oatlands neighbourhood, on the Rutherglen Road. It was close to areas with large Irish populations including Hutchesontown, Bridgeton, the Calton and the Gorbals. The new ground was 1 kilometre (0.62 mi) away from Barrowfield Park, home of the established Clyde F.C., on the opposite bank of the river.

In 1892, Thistle of Dalmarnock took over Hibernian Park and renamed it Braehead Park; however, they themselves only survived for two more years before folding after an attempt to compete in the Scottish Football League resulted in several humiliating defeats. The ground was then used by Benburb before being acquired to become part of the landscaped Richmond Park in 1898 (precipitating Benburb's reformation in Govan), and in the early 21st century the land had some new apartments built upon it (located close to Polmadie Bridge).
