= Graham Charity Cup =

- Organiser(s): Graham Charity Committee (GCC)
- Founded: 1888; 138 years ago
- Abolished: 1893; 133 years ago
- Region: Eastern Glasgow
- Teams: 4–5 (Note: According to the Scottish Referee, Celtic were never asked to compete. This was true for at least the first two editions of the tournament.)
- Last champions: Thistle (1st title)
- Most championships: Clyde (4 titles)

The Graham Charity Cup was an association football competition. It was open to clubs in the East End of Glasgow, Scotland. It was a short-lived competition that lasted between 1888 and 1893.

== History ==
The competition was instituted by Mr John D. Graham for the benefit of charities in the East End of Glasgow. Graham was a board member of Clyde FC and the Scottish Football Association.

The competition was organized by the Graham Charity Committee (GCC). The committee consisted of a President, a Vice president, a Treasurer, and a Secretary.

The competition had a rule that debarred players from assisting other clubs so long as their own team was still in the running for the trophy. (Note: An example was W. Burns (of Camelon) played for Shettleston against Thistle. He was therefore ineligible to play for his parent club in the Falkirk Charity Cup.)

No competition was held in 1891–92.

== Results ==
=== 1887–88 ===
Round	Date	Opponent	Score	Opponent	Venue	Notes	Ref
Semi Final	18 February 1888	Thistle	2–1	Rutherglen	Barrowfield		
Semi Final	18 February 1888	The SFA ordered match to be replayed. Ineligible player fielded during first match.					
Semi Final	14 April 1888	Thistle	5–3	Rutherglen	Barrowfield	Replay. Attendance: 3,000.	
Semi Final	3 March 1888	Clyde	1–0	Shettleston	Beechwood		
Final	6 June 1888	Clyde	4–2	Thistle	Beechwood	Attendance: 4,000.	

=== 1888–89 ===
Round	Date	Winner	Score	Runner-up	Venue	Notes	Ref
Semi Final	29 April 1889 (Note: On 20 April 1889 the replay with Thistle and Shettleston at Barrowfield was postponed for a week because of a match between tenants Clyde and Queen of the South Wanderers.)	Shettleston	4–2	Thistle	Barrowfield		
Semi Final	29 April 1889	The SFA sustained protest made by Thistle to have the match replayed.					
Semi Final	16 May 1889	Thistle	3–2	Shettleston	Barrowfield	Replay.	
Semi Final		Clyde		Rutherglen			
Final	30 May 1889	Clyde	2–2	Thistle	Barrowfield	Attendance: 7,000.	
Final	6 June 1889	Clyde	7–1	Thistle	Barrowfield	Replay.	

=== 1889–90 ===
Round	Date	Opponent	Score	Opponent	Venue	Notes	Ref
1st Round	22 April 1890	Carrington		Clydesdale	Barrowfield		
Semi Final	29 April 1890	Thistle	1–1 (Note: The Scotsman reported the score as Thistle 2–1 Rutherglen in the first match played on 29 April 1890.)	Rutherglen	Barrowfield		
Semi Final	14 May 1890	Thistle		Rutherglen	Barrowfield	Replay.	
Semi Final	6 May 1890	Clyde	6–1	Carrington	Beechwood		
Final	24 May 1890	Clyde	5–2	Thistle	Beechwood	£85 total amount.	

=== 1890–91 ===
Round	Date	Opponent	Score	Opponent	Venue	Notes	Ref
Semi Final		Carrington v Clydesdale					
Semi Final		Clyde v Rutherglen					
Final							

=== 1892–93 ===
Round	Date	Opponent	Score	Opponent	Venue	Notes	Ref
Final	20 May 1893	Clyde	2–4	Thistle			
