= Allan Stewart (footballer) =

Scottish footballer

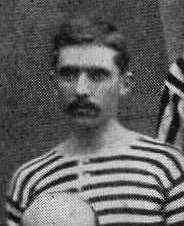
- Stewart with Queen's Park in 1890.

Personal information
- Full name: Allan Stewart
- Date of birth: 12 April 1865
- Place of birth: Kilmarnock, Scotland
- Date of death: 2 October 1907 (aged 42)
- Place of death: London, England
- Position: Right half

Senior career*
Years	Team	Apps	(Gls)
- Pilgrims
1886–1890	Queen's Park		
1888	→ Cowlairs (guest)		

International career
1888–1889	Scotland	2	(1)
- * Club domestic league appearances and goals

Allan Stewart (12 April 1865 – 2 October 1907) was a Scottish footballer who played as a right half.

== Career ==
Born in Kilmarnock and raised in the south of Glasgow, Stewart played club football for Queen's Park (Note: The Queen's Park archive website attributes appearances from 1891 to 1894 to Allan Stewart; checks show these were made by David Stewart (no relation).) and won the Scottish Cup with the club in 1890 – he scored the winning goal in the replayed final, as he had also done in that season's Glasgow Cup final (despite his defensive role, he was known for his powerful shooting from distance). Soon afterwards he quit the game and relocated to London. He had also played as a guest for Cowlairs in one competitive fixture: the final of the 1888 Glasgow Exhibition Cup, and scored in that victory too.

Stewart made two appearances for Scotland, in British Home Championship fixtures against Wales and Ireland. He featured once for the English amateur team Corinthian.
