= Tommy Dunbar =

Tommy Dunbar may refer to:

- Tom Dunbar (1959–2011), outfielder for Major League Baseball's Texas Rangers
- Tom Dunbar (footballer), Scottish footballer who was the first man to cross the Old Firm divide twice
- Tommy Dunbar, founding member of The Rubinoos
