= Airdriehill F.C. (1879) =

Airdriehill
- Full name: Airdriehill Football Club
- Founded: 1879
- Dissolved: 1883
- Ground: Airdriehill Park
- Match Secretary: John Devlin
Home colours

Airdriehill Football Club was a Scottish association football club based in the town of Airdrie, Lanarkshire.

== History ==
The club was founded in March 1879. It played 11 friendly matches in its first season, which encouraged it to take the step up to entering the 1880–81 Scottish Cup. The club was drawn to play Airdrie Bluebell in the first round, but the opponent did not exist, there seemingly being confusion with Plains Blue Bell. Airdriehill lost in the second round 2–1 at Clarkston.

The club entered the Lanarkshire Cup for the first time in 1880–81 as well, and in the second round at Shotts, with Airdriehill 4–0 down, its players "retired in a very exhausted condition, and would not play in the second half"; Airdriehill protested that the ground was not roped in, and the Lanarkshire FA ordered a replay at Clarkston, which Shotts won this time 5–0.

The 1881–82 season was slightly better, as the club (again after a first round walkover) managed a draw in the second round of the Scottish Cup, at the original Airdrie club, but lost 3–2 in the replay. In the Lanarkshire, Airdriehill scored its biggest competitive win in the first round, 8–2 against Whifflet Star of Coatbridge, but lost 4–1 at Cambuslang in the second round. Again Airdriehill protested and earned a replay; this time Cambuslang won 8–0.

By 1882 the club was in a downward spiral, with only 25 members, half of its membership on foundation; its members seem to have joined Airdrie or the Airdrieonians. It did not enter the Lanarkshire Cup in 1882–83, and lost 7–0 at home to Shotts in the Scottish. Airdriehill does not seem to have played any other matches at any level of importance.

The club had fallen so far that when it failed to pay its subscription for the 1883–84 season the Scottish Football Association forgot to include it on the agenda in the list of clubs facing removal from the membership roll. The club was nevertheless struck off, and in 1884 match secretary John Devlin was involved in the founding of a replacement club, also called Airdriehill.

== Colours ==
Its colours were originally blue and yellow jerseys with white knickers. In 1882 the club changed to white.

== Grounds ==
The club played at private grounds at Airdriehill, 50 yards from Whiterigg station.
