= Shotts F.C. =

Shotts
- Full name: Shotts Football Club
- Founded: 1876
- Dissolved: 1883
- Ground: Springhill
- President: William Miller
- Secretary: G. Turner
Home colours

Shotts Football Club was a 19th-century football club based in Shotts, Lanarkshire, Scotland. Although it only existed for 7 years, it twice reached the Lanarkshire Cup final and once reached the Scottish Cup quarter-final.

== History ==
The club was formed in 1876, as a works side for the Shotts Ironworks, and its first match was on 26 August 1876, against a Partick F.C. side, which won 8–0. There had been an attempt to merge with the East Lanarkshire Cricket Club and play under the East Lanarkshire name before undertaking competitive football, but the club only ever played under the Shotts name.

Its first competitive match was in the 1876–77 Scottish Cup, losing at Stonelaw in the first round. One of its earliest reported matches - against the Shotts Instrumental Band - was abandoned after a visiting player broke his collarbone in a fall, the match umpire fortunately being a doctor.

=== Lanarkshire Cup ===
In 1878–79, the club was one of the 16 founder members of the Lanarkshire Football Association, and came fifth in the ballot for representation on the committee. It played in the first Lanarkshire Cup that season, and its first tie, against Calderbank, saw the club gain its record win of 17–0. The club played Hamilton Academical four times in the third round (made up of five clubs), without there being a winner; rather than trying to break the tie, the Acas were ordered to play Stonelaw, with Shotts to meet the winner. As two clubs scratched, the tie between Shotts and the winner (Stonelaw) was the tournament final and it was played at the Acas' ground. Stonelaw took the lead through an own goal, Menzies securing the game with a second before half-time. There was however an allegation that Stonelaw had relied on seven guest players for the final, and, although no protest was made, Stonelaw vanishes from the fixture lists afterwards.

Shotts nearly had instant redemption, reaching the final of the same competition in 1880–81, played at Clarkston in front of "several thousand" spectators, but losing 3–2 to Thistle of east Glasgow, due to a goalkeeping slip with 2 minutes to go. The club had won 12 out of 16 matches, but its only two defeats were the Lanarkshire final and in the second round of the 1880–81 Scottish Cup.

=== Scottish Cup 1881–82: quarter-finalists ===
In the 1881–82 Scottish Cup, the club had its best run in the competition. In the first round, Shotts came from behind to beat Drumpellier 5–1. In the second, the club was drawn at home to Hamilton Academical, and, unlike in the Lanarkshire Cup the previous year, the tie only needed one match to decide it, Shotts winning 2–1.

This put the club into the third round for the first time, and, after a 4–4 draw away from home, Shotts beat the original Airdrie club 5–0. A bye in the fourth round put the club into the fifth, where it was drawn to play at Vale of Teith of Doune, and Shotts enjoyed another 5–0 win; Allender scoring the first after four minutes, Gilchrist heading home the second from a left-wing cross, M'Laughlan making it three 10 minutes before the break from a right-wing cross supplied by captain Darling, and M'Laughlan completing his hat-trick with two second-half goals.

The sixth round was the quarter-finals. Unfortunately for the club, it was drawn against the eventual winners Queen's Park, and, "with a spirit of pluck which clearly showed true football enthusiasm", gave up the home advantage the draw had given it. The club's reward was conceding 9 goals in the first half, and another 6 in the second.

=== End of the club ===
By the time the club played the Scottish Cup quarter-final, the club had already lost in the second round of the Lanarkshire Cup, and Shotts did not enter the local competition in 1882–83. It did enter the Scottish Cup, but, after a 7–0 win at Airdriehill in the first round, it was beaten 10–1 at West Benhar in the second, having taken the lead in the match through an own goal. The club does not seem to have survived into the 1883–84 season, its final match being a "sore defeat" to Wishaw Thistle in April, and the senior football representation for the town passing to Dykehead.

== Colours ==
The club originally played in magenta. By 1877 they were green and red, described as green and crimson from 1878.

== Grounds ==
The club played at the following grounds:

- 1876–77: a field owned by a farmer, Mr Waddell, a short distance from town
- 1877–79: Calderhead
- 1879–81: Stane Farm
- 1881–83: Springhill Farm.
