= Plains F.C. =

Former association football club in Scotland

Plains
- Full name: Plains F.C.
- Founded: 1885
- Dissolved: 1891
- Ground: Mossfield Park
- Hon. Secretary: Thomas Hamilton
- Match Secretary: A. Brown
Home colours

Plains Football Club was an association football club from the village of Plains, Lanarkshire.

== History ==
Plains F.C. was the second senior club to come from the village, after Plains Blue Bell, which had become defunct by mid-1884. The club's first match was in March 1885, a 3–2 win at home to Armadale, and its first competitive football came in the Lanarkshire Cup in 1885–86. Plains lost 4–0 at Dykehead in the second round; the match was marred by a broken leg to Dykehead's Williams, although Plains were not so sympathetic, protesting in vain about the darkness and an offside decision - and that Williams (an ironmoulder from Glasgow) was ineligible to play.

The club was struggling for finances in 1887, with a small membership and heavy ground rent, and one solution was to join the Scottish Football Association and hope for lucrative Scottish Cup ties. The club duly joined in August 1887, and did enjoy some luck in the draw in the 1887–88 Scottish Cup. The club's first round opponent, Tollcross, scratched, despite being expected to beat Plains, and the club drew a bye in the second round.

In the third round, however, the club was drawn to visit Vale of Leven Wanderers, having its best-ever season after recruiting players from Vale of Leven. A one-sided contest went the way of the Dunbartonshire side 9–0.

Plains did not renew its Scottish FA subscription for 1888–89, and indeed did not play again until re-joining the Lanarkshire Association for the 1890–91 season. The club's last match of any note was a 6–0 defeat at Royal Albert in the Coatbridge Express club (for those eliminated from the Lanarkshire Cup) in March 1891, and Plains finally gave up the ghost at the end of the season.

== Colours ==
The club played in a unique combination of navy, red, and brown.

== Ground ==
Plains' home ground was called Mossfield Park.
