= John Hill (Scottish footballer) =

Scottish footballer

Personal information
- Date of birth: c. 1860
- Place of birth: Plains, Scotland
- Position: Left half

Senior career*
Years	Team	Apps	(Gls)
1882–1884	Plains Bluebell		
1884–1885	Glengowan		
1885–1887	Airdrieonians		
1887–1888	Queen's Park		
1888–1893	Heart of Midlothian	33	(2)
1893–1894	Airdrieonians	0	(0)

International career
1891–1892	Scotland	2	(0)
- * Club domestic league appearances and goals

John Hill was a Scottish footballer who played as a left half.

== Career ==
Born in Plains, Hill played club football for Airdrieonians, Queen's Park and Heart of Midlothian and made two appearances for Scotland. He won the Scottish Cup with Hearts in 1891, and later served as the club's president.

== See also ==
- List of Scotland national football team captains
