= Cartvale F.C. (1878) =

Association football club in Renfrewshire, Scotland

Cartvale
- Full name: Cartvale Football Club
- Founded: 1878
- Dissolved: 1890
- Ground: Cartbridge Park
1879-82 colours	1882–86 colours

Cartvale Football Club was a short-lived football club from Busby, East Renfrewshire that existed from 1878 until 1890. The club regularly competed in the Scottish Cup and reached the semi-finals in 1882.

== History ==
The club was founded in 1878, originally playing at Overlee Park, moving to Cartsbridge Park by 1879. Its first entry into the Scottish Cup was in 1878–79, ending in defeat to Arthurlie in the first round.

The club's best run in the competition came in 1881–82, thanks in part to an unusual occurrence. The club beat Renfrew in the first round, but, thanks to a clerical error, was omitted from the second round draw, and had to be given a bye.

A meeting of the Business Committee was held in these rooms at one o'clock on Tuesday the 4th Oct for the purpose of considering what should be done with the Cartvale, who were omitted in the second round of the Cup drawings. The Sec[retar]y stated to those present which included JW Hamilton - who occupied the chair - Messrs R Broome, Devlin, Young, Paton and Stoddart that he had been in correspondence with the Johnstone, who had received a bye, endeavouring to get them to meet the Cartvale, but as they considered it unconstitutional to play a club which had not been drawn along with the others, the only course open to the committee was to give both clubs a bye, and this they instructed the Sec[retar]y to do.

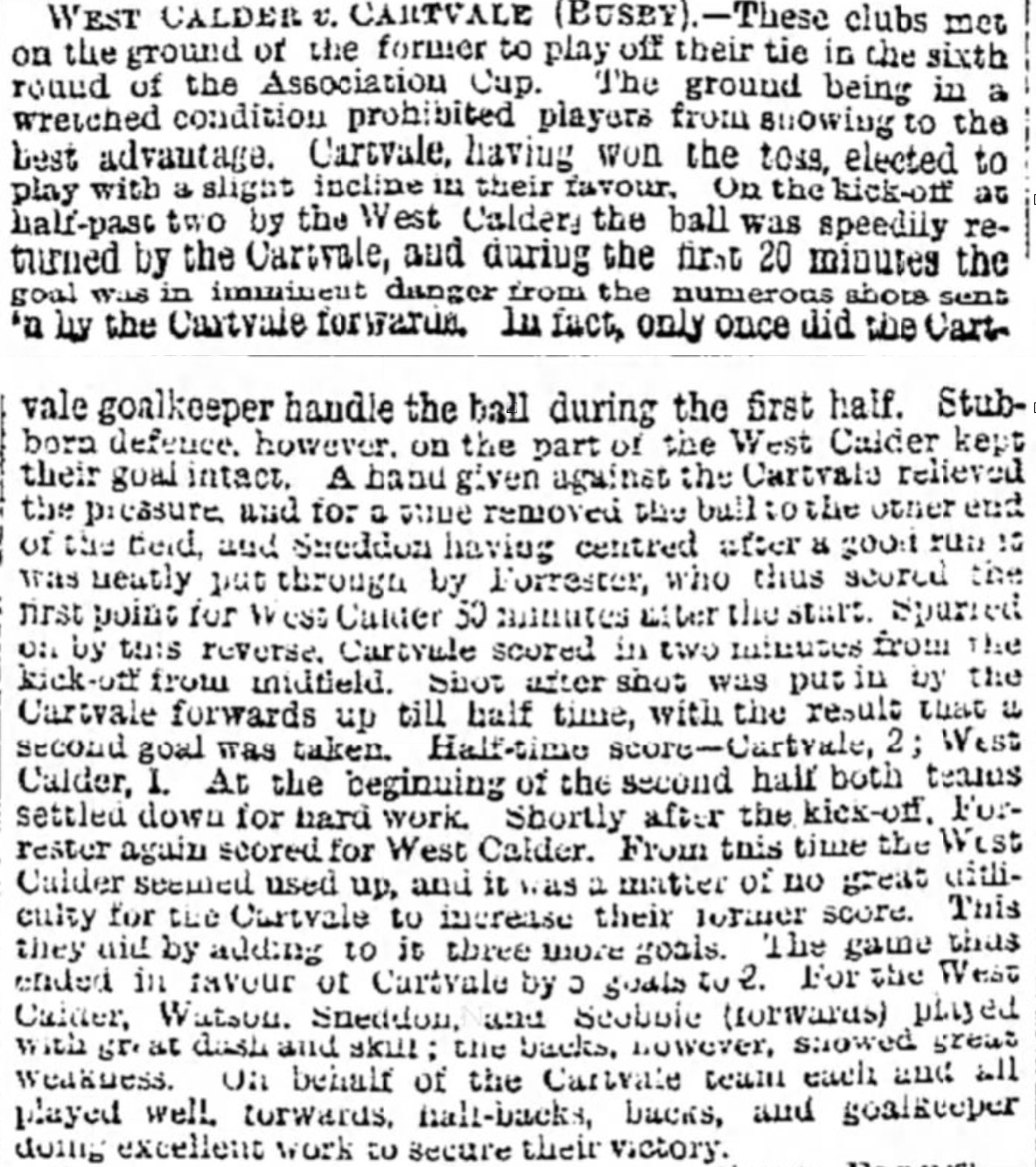
1881–82 Scottish Cup quarter-final, Cartvale 5–2 West Calder, Glasgow Herald, 2 January 1882

The club reaped the benefits of the bye, as it went on its best-ever Cup run, reaching the semi-finals. However the club was overmatched against Dumbarton, conceding a goal in the second minute, turning around at half-time 5–1 in arrears, and ultimately losing 11–2.

Cartvale had some consolation in the Renfrewshire Cup in the same season, as it reached the final for the only time in its history. The game was played at Blackstoun Park in Paisley, the home ground of Abercorn, with Arthurlie as opponent. Cartvale was unlucky to lose the toss, as Arthurlie chose to play with the wind at their backs in the first half, and the wind had dropped for the second; Arthurlie took the trophy with a 2–0 win.

The club reached the final 8 in 1883–84, beating three other Renfrewshire sides, but when drawn to meet Queen's Park at Titwood in the quarter-finals the club again found the step up too difficult, losing 6–1 after conceding four in the second half.

The club's last entry to the national competition was in 1886–87, losing 6–2 at Johnstone. In 1887, the club changed its name to Busby, which had been the name of an earlier club which had existed from 1873 to 1880. The club seems to have wound up by 1890, as its last entry to the Renfrewshire Cup was in 1889–90. Drawn at home to St Mirren in the second round, Busby took the lead, but lost 11–2. By this time the club was not considered on the same level as the senior clubs it had previously played on an even basis, with Abercorn sending a reserve side to play Busby at the start of the season.

== Colours ==
The club's colours were as follows:

Cartvale colours
Years	Shirts	Shorts	Hose
1878–79	Black and white	White	Black
1879–82	White	White	Black
1882–86	Black with red cross	White	Black
1886–90	White	Black	Black

== Ground ==
Cartvale played at Cartbridge Park, 5 minutes' walk from the station, and the Busby Hotel sufficed for facilities.

== Notable players ==
- Robert Calderwood, capped three times for Scotland while with the club
- Michael Dunbar, capped once for Scotland while with the club, scoring in the international against Ireland in 1886
- Tom Dunbar, who later played for both Old Firm clubs
- John Kelly, goalkeeper, who moved to Celtic F.C. in time to play in the 1889 Scottish Cup Final
- J. E. McKillop, referee for the 1886 Scottish Cup Final
