= Tom Dunbar (footballer) =

Scottish footballer

Personal information
- Full name: Thomas Dunbar
- Date of birth: 18 August 1868
- Place of birth: Busby, Scotland
- Date of death: 28 April 1908 (aged 39)
- Position: Defender

Senior career*
Years	Team	Apps	(Gls)
- Rutherglen
1887–1888	Hibernian		
1888	Celtic		
1888–1890	Cartvale		
1890–1891	Celtic	4	(0)
1890	→ St Mirren (loan)	3	(1)
1891–1892	Rangers	11	(0)
1892–1898	Celtic	49	(3)
1897–1898	Cartvale		

International career
1895	Scottish League XI	1	(0)
- * Club domestic league appearances and goals

Thomas Dunbar (18 August 1868 – 28 April 1908) was a Scottish footballer who played for Celtic and Rangers. He is one of only two players to cross the Old Firm divide twice, the other being Kenny Miller.

== Career ==
Having played once for the team in the Scottish Cup in 1888 (a match in which his elder brother Michael also played), Dunbar signed for Celtic from Busby Cartvale in 1890. Following a short loan spell with St Mirren, one of his first Scottish Football League appearances for the Bhoys came at Rangers during a 2–1 victory on 2 May 1891. A few months later, in November 1891, he joined Rangers hoping to play more regularly, but although he did so the team had a poor run of results during the campaign and he returned to Celtic by July of the following year. He was one of several players of the Catholic faith to feature for Rangers in the pre-World War I era, after which an unwritten rule was introduced at the club which persisted for several decades.

He spent the next five years with Celtic and left in 1897, seldom a first choice when all players were available but making a total of 61 League and Scottish Cup appearances for the club across both spells; he was part of the squad which won the title in 1892–93, 1893–94 and 1895–96, and the Glasgow Cup in 1894–95.

== See also ==
- Played for Celtic and Rangers
