= Plains Blue Bell F.C. =

Former association football club in Scotland

Plains Blue Bell
- Full name: Plains Blue Bell Football Club
- Nickname: the Blue Bell
- Founded: 1878
- Dissolved: 1885
- Ground: Plains Football Ground
- Hon. Secretary: James Jack, James Gage
- Match Secretary: Robert Simpson, John Hills
Home colours

Plains Blue Bell Football Club was a Scottish association football club based in the village of Plains, Lanarkshire.

== History ==
The club was founded in 1878. It was sometimes referred to as Plains Blue Bells, and sometimes as Bluebell(s), although the name as registered was Plains Blue Bell.

The Blue Bell sought to join the Scottish Football Association in time to enter the 1879–80 Scottish Cup, but its entry was postponed for later consideration. It was however allowed to enter the competition for the second round, where it beat Newmains. The win was the club's only Cup tie victory in 5 entries.

In the third the club was fortunate when opponents Queen of the South Wanderers scratched; in the fourth the club lost 3–0 at Cambuslang, the Blue Bell side's game being "characterised by roughness rather than by art", although there was a bizarre aftermath when the club protested at the standard of refereeing, and the referee wrote to the Scottish FA to declare the result as being 2–2. The SFA nevertheless held to the result as reported.

The Blue Bell was one of the founders of the Lanarkshire Association in late 1879, and entered the first Lanarkshire Cup the same year. The club's best run in the competition came in 1882–83, when it reached the semi-final; in the first round, the club drew three times with Dykehead, meaning both teams progressed into the second round. Plains lost the semi-final to eventual winners Benhar.

It was however the club's last entry to the competition. It had already put in an entry to the 1883–84 Scottish Cup but scratched to Clarkston. The club's senior existence ended when it struck off the association membership roll in August 1884; two isolated references to "Plains Bluebell" in 1885 probably relate to the Plains Football Club. Some members of the "now defunct" club formed an XI that played a one-off match in 1886, and the name was later used for a Junior side.

== Colours ==
The club originally wore red and black hooped jerseys, blue (serge) knickers, and red stockings. In 1881 it changed its knickers to white.

== Grounds ==
The club's original ground was a private enclosure 1 mile from Clarkston railway station. In 1882 it had a new ground in Plains itself, 100 yards from the new Plains railway station. Given the small size of Plains, which at the time was little more than a series of houses strung along Main Street, the ground did not have a distinctive name, and was referred to as "the football ground".

== Notable players ==
- John Hill, played for Plains in 1882–84, and later earned a Scotland cap.
