= Busby F.C. =

Association football club in Renfrewshire, Scotland

Busby
- Full name: Busby Football Club
- Founded: 1873
- Dissolved: 1880
- Ground: Field Park
- Hon. Secretary: William Leggatt
Home colours

Busby Football Club was an association football club from Busby in Renfrewshire.

== History ==
The club was founded in 1873 and its earliest reported matches are from 1874.

The club's first entry to the Scottish Cup was in 1876–77. At the time, the first two rounds were played on a geographical basis, and Busby was one of only four clubs in the Renfrewshire division of the draw; the club beat Renfrew and the 23rd Renfrewshire Rifle Volunteers (who had beaten Thornliebank) - the 23rd protested the Busby goal, to no avail - which put the club into the national section. After two draws against Hamilton at this third round stage, the second in front of a crowd of over 500, both clubs were put through to the fourth round in accordance with the regulations at the time.

The club's run ended with a 4–0 defeat at Vale of Leven, the defeat blamed on Busby's "long kicking" and inability to deal with the Vale's short passing.

It was the club's best run in the competition, the club disbanding shortly after losing at home to Arthurlie in the first round of the 1879–80 tournament. One of the club's victims was Greenock Morton, whom the club beat in the first round in 1878–79, although the North British Daily Mail confused Busby with Cartvale F.C., stating that Barrhead had beaten Busby, rather than Cartvale, "four goals and two disputed to one".

The Busby name was briefly revived from 1887 to 1890 after the Cartvale club changed its name.

== Colours ==
The club's colours were listed as red, white, and blue until 1877, and blue and white striped jerseys (at the time, stripes referred to hoops), with white knickers and red hose afterwards; the descriptions may refer to the same kit.

== Ground ==
The club's ground was Field Park until 1877, and Cartsbridge Park afterwards. The ground was noted to be particularly narrow, making good play difficult.

== Notable players ==
- Robert Calderwood, future international
