= Braehead Park =

Football ground in Glasgow, Scotland

- Location within Glasgow council area
- Former names: Hibernian Park
- Location: Glasgow, Scotland
- Coordinates: 55.8417°N 4.2365°W
- Surface: Grass
- Record attendance: 4,000

Construction
- Opened: 1889

Tenants
- Glasgow Hibernian (1889–1890); Thistle (1892–1895)

Braehead Park, originally known as Hibernian Park, was a football ground in the Oatlands area of Glasgow, Scotland. It was the home ground of Glasgow Hibernian from 1889 until 1890, then used by Thistle from 1892 until they folded in 1895.

== History ==
The ground was constructed in summer 1889 by the founders of Glasgow Hibernian, a new club formed by dissident members of Celtic who wanted a team for the Irish community of Glasgow run along similar lines to Edinburgh Hibs, and hoped to capitalise on the large fanbase Celtic had already amassed in the community, as the surrounding areas of south and eastern Glasgow had a large Irish Catholic population. Initially known as Hiberian Park, the ground was located on the southern bank of the River Clyde, east of Hutchesontown, and 0.56 miles (0.90 km) away from Barrowfield Park, home of the established Clyde, on the opposite bank of the river. A stand was built on the southern side of the pitch, and embankments raised around the other three sides.

However, poor results and attendances were recorded (4,000 attended a Glasgow Cup defeat to Queen's Park in September 1889, but this was only about 20% of the crowd when Celtic faced the same opponent in the same month) and Glasgow Hibernian folded by autumn 1890. While known as Hibernian Park, in February 1890 the ground staged the first match in what became the Scotland Junior international team's regular series against Northern Ireland Juniors, the Scots winning the match 11–0.

Thistle, originally based a short distance to the east at Beechwood Park in Dalmarnock, moved to the vacant ground in 1892 and named it Braehead Park, opening with a match against neighbours Clyde. In 1893 they joined the Scottish Football League, becoming founder members of Division Two. The first SFL match was played at Braehead Park on 19 August 1893, with Thistle losing 2–1 to Hibernian. By the time Partick Thistle visited on 21 October, the ground was said to have been in a state of disrepair. The probable record attendance for the club was 2,000, set for a Glasgow Cup game against Celtic on 28 October 1893, with Thistle losing 7–0.

Thistle resigned from the SFL at the end of their first season, and the final league match was played at the ground on 24 March 1894, with the visiting Motherwell team winning 8–1. The club folded a year later.

The ground was used for a few years by a team called Benburb (a precursor to the Benburb club founded a short time later in Govan) who called it 'Benburb Park', until 1898 when it was acquired by the Glasgow Corporation and became part of Richmond Park, but was not retained for football use – although the park did have a football pitch as one of its features. Housing was later built on the site in the early 21st century as part of the regeneration of Oatlands.
