= Glasgow North Eastern Cup =

- Founded: 1881; 144 years ago
- Abolished: 1895; 130 years ago
- Region: Scotland
- Last champions: Clyde (4th title)
- Most championships: Cowlairs (5 titles)

The Glasgow North Eastern Cup was a senior competition organised by the North Eastern FA in Glasgow, and open to clubs in the East and North areas of the city.

== History ==
The trophy was made following a donation by Archibald A. Adams of Shirgarton, a member of the Alexandra Athletic club.

== 1881–82 season ==
=== Matches ===
==== Semi-final ====
8 April 1882	Alexandra Athletic	1–2	Tollcross	Glasgow
15:00		Report		Stadium: Unknown; Referee: Unknown

15 April 1882	Petershill	3–2	Clyde	Glasgow
15:00		Report		Stadium: Unknown; Referee: Unknown

==== Final ====
20 May 1882	Tollcross	0–5	Petershill	Glasgow
15:00		Report		Stadium: Kennyhill Park; Referee: Unknown

== 1886-87 season ==
Tollcross were awarded the trophy in 1886–87. Cowlairs were supposed to be their opponents in the final, but the team never turned up for the match.

== 1888-89 season ==
Celtic were presented with the trophy and the accompanying badges on May 31, 1889. A smoking ceremony was held in Campbell's, Dunlop Street.

== 1890-91 season ==
Holders Celtic chose not to enter the competition in 1890–91 with the inauguration of the Scottish League.

The Scottish FA scheduled the Home Nations match between Scotland and Ireland on the same day as the tournament final. The North Eastern FA felt aggrieved as it would likely result in reduced attendances for both teams on the day.

== Winners ==
Season	Winners	Score	Runners-up	Venue	Ref
1881–82	Petershill		Tollcross		
1882–83	Cowlairs		Clyde		
1883–84	Cowlairs	3–2	Northern		
1884–85	Northern	5–1	Thistle		
1885–86	Cowlairs	3–2	Clyde	Beechwood Park	
1886–87	Tollcross	w.o.	Cowlairs		
1887–88	Cowlairs	1–0	Northern	Barrowfield Park	
1888–89	Celtic	6–1	Cowlairs	Barrowfield Park	
1889–90	Celtic	2–0	Northern	Barrowfield Park	
1890–91	Clyde	3–0	Northern	Beechwood Park	
1891–92	Northern	1–0	Thistle		
1892–93	Clyde	3–0	Cowlairs		
1893–94	Clyde		Cowlairs		
1894–95	Clyde	3–2	Partick Thistle	Barrowfield Park	
