= Thomas McKeown =

Thomas or Tom McKeown may refer to:

- Thomas McKeown (footballer), Scottish footballer
- Thomas McKeown (physician), British physician, epidemiologist and historian of medicine
- Tom D. McKeown (1878–1951), U.S. representative from Oklahoma
- Tom McKeown (poet) (born 1937), American poet
