= Albatross F.C. =

Association football club in Glasgow City, Scotland

Albatross
- Full name: Albatross Football Club
- Founded: 1876
- Dissolved: 1880
- Ground: Helenvale Park
- Secretary: Robert White, James Smellie, Andrew Shearer
Home colours

Albatross Football Club was a 19th-century football club from the east end of Glasgow.

== History ==
The club was founded in 1876. By its second season, it had 37 members, which made it one of the smaller senior clubs in Glasgow. The club may have had an association with the Ferguson, Shaw & Sons company of oil and grease refiners, as one of the club's match secretaries accepted correspondence at the firm's Stockwell Street premises.

The club was one of 36 admitted to the Scottish Football Association at the start of the 1877–78 season, which meant the club could enter the 1877–78 Scottish Cup. In the first round, Albatross lost 6–0 at Govan.

Albatross entered for the next two seasons, but lost in the first round both times; 4–2 at Petershill in 1878–79 and 4–0 at the much larger Alexandra Athletic in 1879–80.

The club only played 9 matches in the 1878–79 season, with 3 wins, draws, and losses, and only 11 goals scored in those matches. Still only boasting 37 members, the club was the third smallest senior club in the city (along with Ailsa), and bigger only than Rosslyn and Union. It did not re-emerge for the 1880–81 season.

== Colours ==
The club played in royal blue jerseys, white knickers, and blue and white hose.

== Grounds ==
The club originally played at Barrowfield Park, ten minutes' walk from Bridgeton Cross, and which was also the home of the Clyde club at the time. In 1877 the club moved to Helenvale Park in Parkhead, where the Glasgow Corporation Transport F.C. ground would be built half a century later.
