= Hyde Park, Glasgow =

Football ground in Glasgow, Scotland

Hyde Park
- Location within Glasgow council area
- Location: Glasgow, Scotland
- Coordinates: 55.8799°N 4.2315°W
- Surface: Grass
- Record attendance: 6,000

Construction
- Opened: 1874
- Closed: 1897

Tenant
- Northern

Hyde Park was a football ground in the Springburn area of Glasgow, Scotland. It was the home ground of Northern for most of its existence.

== History ==
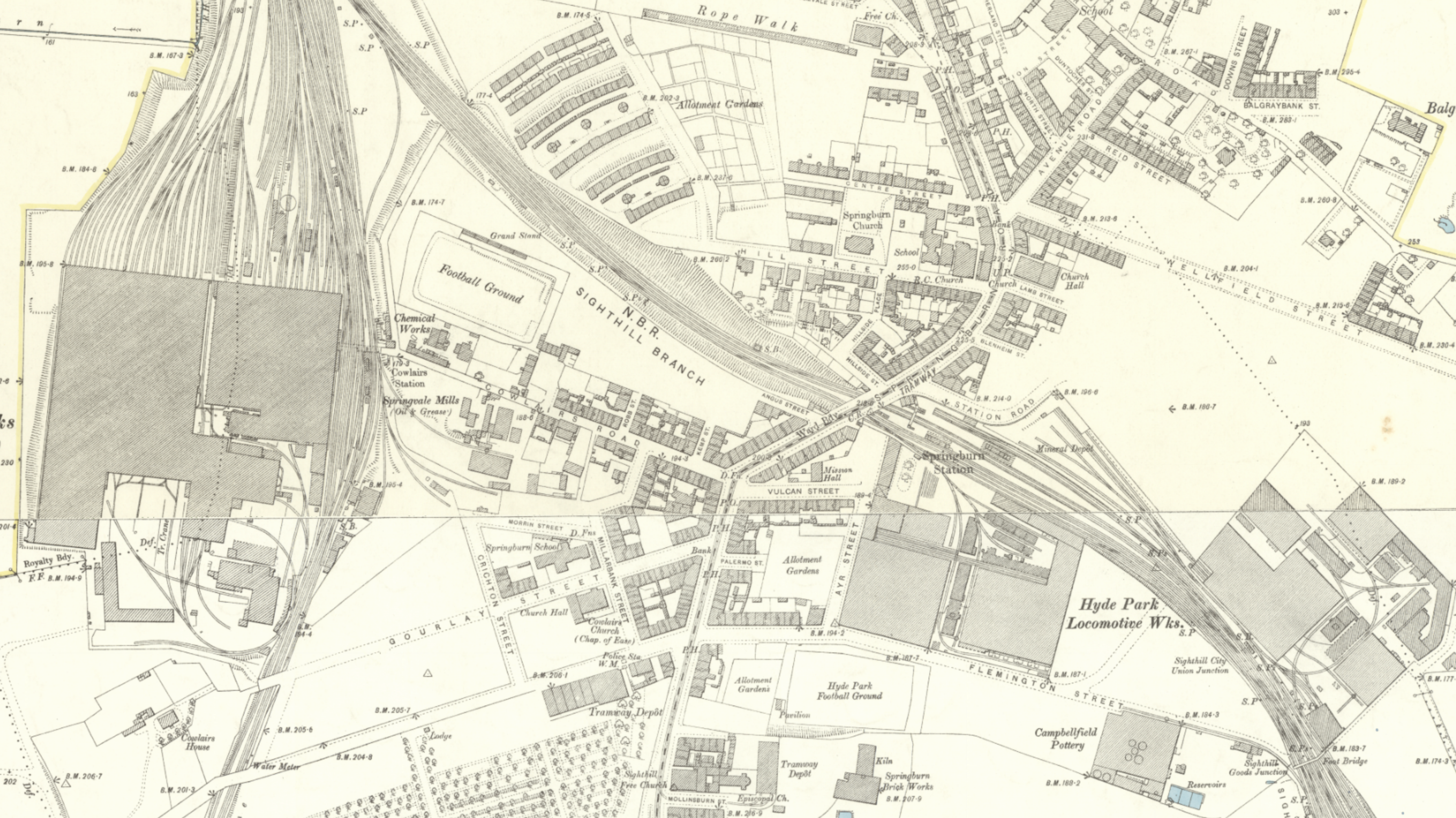
1896 Ordnance Survey map showing the Cowlairs railway works and Cowlairs F.C. football ground (left), and the Hyde Park locomotive works plus the Hyde Park ground (right)

Northern was established in 1874 and started playing at Hyde Park in February 1875. The ground was located opposite the Neilson and Company Hyde Park Locomotive Works, and had few spectator facilities; a pavilion in the south-west corner of the ground and some embankments along the southern side of the pitch. The record attendance at the ground was probably 6,000, which was set for a Glasgow Cup second round match against Rangers on 12 October 1889, with the visitors winning 6–3. This was matched for another Glasgow Cup game against Celtic on 7 October 1893, with Celtic winning 3–2.

In 1893 the club became a founder member of Scottish Football League Division Two, and the first SFL match was played at Hyde Park on 26 August 1893, with Clyde winning 3–1. However, Northern were not re-elected to the league at the end of the season, and their final SFL match at Hyde Park was played on 28 April 1894, with Greenock Morton winning 7–2.

Northern remained at the ground until folding in 1897, after which the site was converted to housing and office buildings for the Locomotive Works.
