= Clarkston F.C. =

19th-century Scottish football club

Clarkston
- Full name: Clarkston Football Club
- Founded: 1877
- Dissolved: 1885
- Ground: Blackrigg Farm
- Secretary: Alex. Sloan
Home colours

Clarkston Football Club was a 19th-century football club based in Clarkston, now in Airdrie, Lanarkshire, Scotland.

== History ==
The club was formed in 1877. Its earliest recorded game was a goalless draw with Hamilton Thistle in December 1877.

The club entered the Scottish Cup from 1878–79 to 1884–85. In its first entry it got through to the third round without winning a tie; it had a bye in round 1 and drew twice with Shotts in the second, which, under the competition rules, meant both sides were put through. In the third the club lost 1–0 at Stonelaw.

The club was a formative influence within its county. In 1878–79, the club secretary, Alex Sloan, circulated a letter among other clubs in Lanarkshire, seeking to form a local association; Clarkston was one of the 16 founder members of the Lanarkshire Football Association, and was top of the ballot for representation on the committee.

Clarkston duly entered the first Lanarkshire Cup that season. Its run in the competition was complex. In the first round opponents Airdrie were disqualified for fielding an ineligible player, in the second Clarkston beat Shettleston 6–0, in the third it drew twice with Hamilton Academical, with both sides being added to Shotts and Stonelaw in the de facto semi final. However Clarkston seems to have withdrawn before playing its tie with Stonelaw.

Clarkston won two ties in each of its next two Scottish Cup entries. In 1879–80 it gained revenge over Stonelaw with a 2–1 win, the first goal scored after the goalkeeper dropped the ball when charged by Forsyth, and Sturton poking the loose ball home, and the winner coming from a shot from the corner which "to the surprise of almost all as well as the goalkeeper" was carried under the tape by the wind. In the second, Clarkston won 2–0 at Shotts in a "well-contested and very friendly" game, and, in the third round, the club lost 4–2 at Cambuslang in an "interesting game".

In 1880–81, winning two ties put Clarkston through to the fourth round, thanks to another bye, where it was drawn to play an Ayrshire side - either Kilmarnock or Mauchline - at home. That tie went to two replays, the second of which (won by Mauchline) being played on the day most of the fourth round ties were played. It meant the fifth round was drawn out before Clarkston could arrange the fourth round tie, and, as the draw was to play Queen's Park, one of the strongest clubs in the world at the time, Clarkston withdrew, knowing that its run would end then at the latest.

The same season, Clarkston also reached the semi-final of the Lanarkshire Cup again, en route recording its biggest win; 14–0 against the Foresters club, watched by between 300 and 400 spectators, the first goal coming in the first minute and 8 before half-time. In the semi-final the club lost 3–0 to Shotts in a replay.

The 1880–81 season was the club's high point. It did not reach so far in the Lanarkshire Cup again and only once more won two ties in the Scottish Cup. This was in 1882–83, when it beat Drumpellier (after a protested tie) and Royal Albert in a "very agreeable" game. In the third round the club was drawn to play at Queen's Park and lost by an unlucky 13 goals to nil, five falling to Harrower. The previous week Clarkston had beaten Glengowan 9–0 in a friendly.

Clarkston had never been a big club, its membership never being more than 50. By its final season its membership of 30 was dwarfed by that of Airdrieonians, whose membership was up to 100, and was also smaller than Airdrie and Airdriehill; indeed no senior Lanarkshire club had a smaller membership. The club ceased operations after the 1884–85 season, finishing up with a 5–0 defeat at West Benhar in the inaugural Airdrie Charity Cup, and the Scottish Football Association struck the club from membership before the 1885–86 season. The club had entered the Lanarkshire Cup for the season, and was drawn at home to Plains, but the match did not take place.

== Colours ==
The club played in navy blue.

== Grounds ==
The club never managed to gain a permanent home, changing on a regular basis. It is known to have played at the following:

- 1879–80: Brownieside, 10 minutes' walk from Clarkston station, the ground described as "the slope of a hill...divided into two or three places by deep ruts across it, in which any of the players could easily have hid themselves"
- 1880–82: Blackrigg Farm, a "spacious" ground 2 minutes from the station, and a few hundred yards to the south of the village. Blackrigg Farm hosted the Lanarkshire Cup final in 1881
- 1882–84: Cowbrae, 10 minutes from the station
- 1884–85: Craigneuk Park, 2 minutes' walk from the station
