= Drumpellier F.C. =

Former association football club in Scotland

Drumpellier
- Full name: Drumpellier F.C.
- Nickname(s): the Drumpellierites
- Founded: 1874
- Dissolved: 1888
- Ground: Drumpellier Cricket Ground
- President: Col. Buchanan
- Secretary: John Stewart
Home colours

Drumpellier Football Club was a Scottish football team located in the town of Coatbridge, Lanarkshire, Scotland.

== History ==
The club was founded in 1874, as an offshoot of the Drumpellier Cricket Club, with 98 members within two seasons. Its first recorded match was towards the end of the 1874–75 season, against the 1st Lanark club.

Drumpellier entered the Scottish Cup for the first time in 1875–76. The club won at Barrhead in the first round after Ferrie "breasted through" after a save from a Walton shot. The club beat Heart of Midlothian 2–0 in the second round but lost 5–1 to Dumbarton in the third, in part due to three of the Drumpellier players being "seriously injured" by Dumbarton players illegally "charging from behind".

The club had difficulty arranging matches; its next game did not take place until six weeks later, a defeat at Alexandra Athletic, in a match affected by some players preferring to watch the big Cup tie between Queen's Park and Vale of Leven on the same day.

The club's first appearance in the Cup was its most successful, in that it was one of the final 14 clubs, but it reached one round further in 1877–78, albeit the fourth round was made up of 19 clubs, and Drumpellier only won one match to reach that far, 3–2 at Shotts F.C. in the first round. The club received a bye in the second, and drew twice with Glengowan F.C. in the third, although the replay at Caldercruix was only declared a 1–1 draw after a protest, as Drumpellier had been reported as 1–0 winners. Under the rules of the competition at the time, both clubs progressed to the fourth round, but Drumpellier lost 3–1 at Parkgrove after taking a (disputed) lead.

Drumpellier continued to enter the Cup every season until 1887–88, but never won another tie; indeed it only drew once, at home Benhar F.C. in the first round in 1883–84, in an "exceedingly rough" match, at which the "conduct of the spectators was beyond all excuse". In the replay the club suffered a club record 12–0 defeat. Its final tie, against Motherwell F.C., ended in a 3–2 defeat, after Motherwell scored two late goals.

Drumpellier had more success in local football. The club took part in the first Lanarkshire Cup in 1879–80, losing in the second round against Glengowan in a replay, played at the neutral ground of Clarkston after Drumpellier's protest against Glengowan's rough play was upheld. Drumpellier lost to Dykehead F.C. in the semi-final in 1883–84, having recorded its record win of 11–0 against Airdrie Caledonians in the second round, and reached the final in 1886–87. The club had originally lost to 5–3 Cambuslang Hibernian in the first round. Drumpellier protested on a number of grounds - rough play, one goal being given when it had passed over the bar, the final two Hibernian goals being "clearly off-side", and spectators interfering with play - and the Lanarkshire FA put both teams through to the second round. In the final, at the South Avenue ground of Hamilton Academical, Drumpellier lost 5–0 to holders Airdrieonians, in front of a poor crowd, the reason put down to there being "but one team in the hunt"; the 'Onians scored three in the first half, and only the heroics of goalkeeper Dolan kept the score down to 5.

Drumpellier's last competitive match was a 5–0 defeat at fellow Coatbridge side Albion Rovers in the third round of the Lanarkshire Cup the next season. The last reference to a club match is a 1–0 defeat at Hamilton Academical towards the end of the 1887–88 season.

== Colours ==
The club wore navy blue jerseys and white knickers, with Cambridge blue and white stockings.

== Ground ==
The club originally played at the "beautiful" Drumpellier Cricket Ground, which belonged to the club's president Col. Buchanan. In 1884, the club moved to Blair Lodge Park, opening its tenure with a Scottish Cup tie against Airdrieonians.
