= 1878–79 in Scottish football =

Football in Scotland
- Season: 1878–79

1878–79 in Scottish football

Scottish Cup winners
- Vale of Leven

The 1878–79 season was the sixth season of competitive football in Scotland. This season saw the introduction of the third regional competition with the inaugural playing of the Renfrewshire Cup.

== Scottish Cup ==
Winner	Score	Runner-up
Vale of Leven	1–1	Rangers

== County honours ==
Competition	Winner	Score	Runner-up
Ayrshire Cup	Kilmarnock Athletic	2–1*	Kilmarnock Portland
Edinburgh FA Cup	Hibernian	2–0*	Hearts
Renfrewshire Cup	Thornliebank	2–0 †	Arthurlie

* – replay
† – second replay

== Other honours ==
Competition	Winner	Score	Runner-up
Glasgow Charity Cup	Rangers	2–1	Vale of Leven

== Scotland national team ==
Date	Venue	Opponents	Score	Competition	Scotland scorers
5 April 1879	Kennington Oval, London	England	4–5	Friendly	Billy MacKinnon (2), John McDougall, John Smith
7 April 1879	Acton Park, Wrexham	Wales	3–0	Friendly	John Smith (2), Peter Campbell
