= John Conway (surgeon) =

Surgeon and Celtic F.C. honorary president (1859–1894)

Dr. John Conway
- John Conway in an undated photograph
- Born: 1859; Glasgow, Scotland
- Died: 24 January 1894 (aged 34–35)
- Education: St Aloysius' College, Glasgow; University of Glasgow
- Occupation: Surgeon · honorary physician · football president
- Known for: Honorary football president of Celtic F.C. (1887–1891)

John Conway (1859 – 24 January 1894) was a Scottish surgeon and honorary physician, who was the honorary president of Celtic F.C. from 1887 to 1891.

== Early life and career ==
John Conway was born in 1859 in Glasgow, Scotland. Conway grew up in a Roman Catholic household, with his father, John Conway Sr., being the first Catholic representative of the Glasgow Parochial Board. He studied at St Mungo's Academy with Brother Walfrid as his tutor.

He then would study at St Aloysius' College, Glasgow, before going to the University of Glasgow as a medical student. After graduating from Glasgow, he was admitted to the Royal College of Surgeons of England, however he refused, in favor of assisting the poor in Glasgow. He would open a medical clinic in Glasgow after. He would continue to be a doctor after founding Celtic F.C., and eventually became the honorary physician of Whitevale Children’s Refuge in 1890.

He also established the Glasgow Printing Company, along with future committee member Joseph Shaughnessy. Shareholders of the company included James Quillan, Celtic vice-president, Joseph Nelis, and John Glass. Shaughnessy would be the secretary of the company until committee member Michael Cairns.

He would also be a member of the Society of Saint Vincent de Paul, the Catholic Union, the Catholic Benefit Society, the Catholic Literary Society, and the Irish National Foresters.

=== Celtic F.C. ===
Conway would be involved in the formation of Celtic F.C., starting in 1884. He would be the honorary president of Celtic F.C. from 1887, the teams founding, to 1890. He would also kick the first ball at Celtic Park in 1888, in a game between Hibernian and Cowlairs. He would be succeeded as Honorary President by Joseph Shaughnessy in 1891.

He was also one of the founding fathers of Celtic F.C., as he, along with John Glass, Brother Walfrid, Pat Welsh, and John McLaughlin founded the club in 1887.

== Personal life and death ==
Conway died on 24 January 1894, aged 35 due to apoplexy.

== See also ==
- History of Celtic F.C. (1887–1994)
