= Willie Dunning =

Scottish footballer

Personal information
- Full name: William Dunning
- Date of birth: 2 January 1865
- Place of birth: Arthurlie, Scotland
- Date of death: 1902 (aged 36–37)
- Position: Goalkeeper

Senior career*
| Years | Team | Apps | (Gls) |
| 1888–1889 | Johnstone | | |
| 1889–1890 | Celtic | | |
| 1890 | Glasgow Hibernian | | |
| 1891–1892 | Bootle | | |
| 1892–1895 | Aston Villa | 64 | (0) |
| Total | | 64 | (0) |
- * Club domestic league appearances and goals

William Dunning (2 January 1865 – 1902) was a Scottish footballer who played in the Football League for Aston Villa.
