= Michael Dunbar =

Scottish footballer

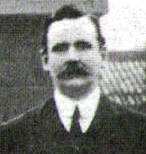

Personal information
- Full name: Michael Dunbar
- Date of birth: 30 October 1863
- Place of birth: Glasgow, Scotland
- Date of death: 6 September 1921 (aged 57)
- Position: Inside right

Senior career*
Years	Team	Apps	(Gls)
–1886	Cartvale		
1886–1887	Cowlairs		
1887–1888	Hibernian		
1888–1893	Celtic	14	(4)

International career
1886	Scotland	1	(1)
- * Club domestic league appearances and goals

Michael Dunbar (30 October 1863 – 6 September 1921) was a Scottish footballer. He played for Cartvale, Cowlairs, Hibernian and Celtic as an inside right. After being forced to retire from playing football due to injury, Dunbar became a director of Celtic.
