= West Benhar F.C. =

Former association football club in Scotland

Coordinates: 55.861312°N 3.754052°W

West Benhar FC
- Full name: West Benhar FC
- Founded: 1880
- Dissolved: 1886
- Ground: Harthill Mains
- President: John M'Naghten Esq.
- Secretary: Thomas Goldie
Home colours

West Benhar Football Club (also known simply as Benhar) was a senior football club from the small mining settlement of West Benhar, a mile to the south west of Harthill, Scotland. There is now little left of this settlement.

== History ==
They were formed in August 1880 by Thomas "Baker" Brown and for a short spell were a renowned cup team, playing in local competitions as well as the Scottish Cup.

The club entered the national competition from 1881–82 to 1885–86. Benhar's Cup record was strong; in the club's first entry, it reached the fourth round, and held Hibernian to a draw before losing the replay. The same season, the club also entered the Lanarkshire Cup for the first time, but lost in the first round.

However, in 1882–83, the club won the Lanarkshire. The final, at Airdrie Cricket Ground, saw Benhar beat Royal Albert 4–1.

The 1883–84 Scottish Cup saw the club's biggest competitive win. In the first round, the club was surprisingly held to a 2–2 draw at the fading Drumpellier club, in an "exceedingly rough" match, at which the "conduct of the spectators was beyond all excuse". In the replay Benhar made no mistake with a 12–0 win.

Benhar's best Scottish Cup run came in 1884–85, reaching the fifth round (final 11 clubs). It had to play the second round tie with Shettleston twice, the Scottish Football Association ordering a replay after Shettleston protested against Benhar's "rough play" in Benhar's 9–1 victory. This was to no avail for Shettleston as it lost again, albeit only 4–1, at neutral ground in Airdrie in front of over a thousand spectators; the Shettleston fans "hooted and hissed tremendously" at the Benhar side.

In the third round, the club gained revenge over St Bernards for a heavy defeat in the Cup the previous year with a 5–1 win; in the fourth Benhar beat Our Boys of Dundee 8–3 in a home replay. Our Boys protested the defeat on the basis that the match ended in darkness, due to Benhar not sending a coach to collect the Our Boys team from Shotts, which required Our Boys to walk 4 miles to Harthill. Benhar provided evidence that it sent a telegram offering to send a conveyance either to Shotts or West Craigs, but the answer did not come until after the match, as it had been sent to the wrong address, so the protest was dismissed.

The run ended at Annbank in some controversy. Annbank won the toss and chose to kick with a heavy wind behind it; by half-time Annbank was 5 goals to the good. With the wind now in its favour, Benhar scored within 3 minutes of the kick-off, but Annbank resorted to the tactic of clearing the ball out of the ground at every opportunity, taking advantage of the nearby Ayr Water, and, with no time being added on for such time-wasting, the club lost at least 15 minutes in fishing the ball out of the river.

The club also nearly repeated its 1882 success in the Lanarkshire Cup in the same season, reaching the final, after an acrimonious semi-final against Airdrieonians, West Benhar originally winning 2–1 but being made to replay after a protest; a second Airdrieonians protest against the crowd control was dismissed. In the final Benhar lost 5–3 to Cambuslang in a replay, in front of 2,500 at Hamilton; and over the season scored 140 goals in 30 matches. It finished the season by reaching the final of the first Airdrie Charity Cup, beating Clarkston 5–0 in the semi-final tie, but went down 6–2 to Airdrieonians before 3,000 spectators at the Airdrie Cricket Ground.

However the club's success was also its downfall. Professionalism was made legal in England by the Football Association in 1885 and the club lost a number of its players to other clubs; in particular a number of players, such as the Reid brothers, Glen, and Sneddon, crossed over to play for the ambitious Airdrieonians. The season after being one of the top dozen clubs in Scotland, Benhar was struck from the Second XI roll, and could not field enough players against Hamilton Academical in a Scottish Cup tie. The last reported match for the club was a 5–2 defeat at East Stirlingshire in a friendly in August 1885 and the club was touted as being defunct the following month, although the club remained technically entered in the Lanarkshire Cup, and after two walkovers was drawn to Cambuslang in the third round in January 1886; it scratched from the tournament on the day of the match. The club's formal end was its removal from the register of clubs before the 1886–87 season.

=== Reform ===
What was left of the club reformed as West Benhar Violet as members of the Scottish Junior Football Association and was a finalist in the Scottish Junior Cup in 1889 and 1892, before folding around the turn of the century.

== Colours ==
The club played in red and blue hooped jerseys and socks, plus white knickers with red and blue stripes.

== Ground ==
Their home ground was situated in nearby Harthill, and the pitch still exists in the village today. It was reputed that Benhar had never lost a home game at Harthill Mains; certainly the club was unbeaten at home until at least November 1883 and never lost a competitive match there.

== Famous players ==
- Matt McQueen, who resided in Harthill and worked at the Benhar Colliery. He joined Leith Athletic where he won two International caps for Scotland. He was eventually signed by Liverpool where after retiring as a player he became Manager and a Director of the club.
- Hugh McQueen, Matt's brother

== Honours ==
Lanarkshire Cup

- Winners: 1882–83
- Runners-up: 1884–85

Airdrie Charity Cup

- Runners-up: 1884–85
