= Northern F.C. =

Former association football club in Scotland

Northern
- Full name: Northern Football Club
- Nickname: the Hyde Men
- Founded: 17 September 1874
- Dissolved: 1897
- Ground: Hyde Park, Glasgow
Home colours

Northern Football Club was a football club based at Hyde Park in the Springburn area of Glasgow, Scotland. The club was a founder member of Scottish Football League Division Two, but left after a single season.

== History ==
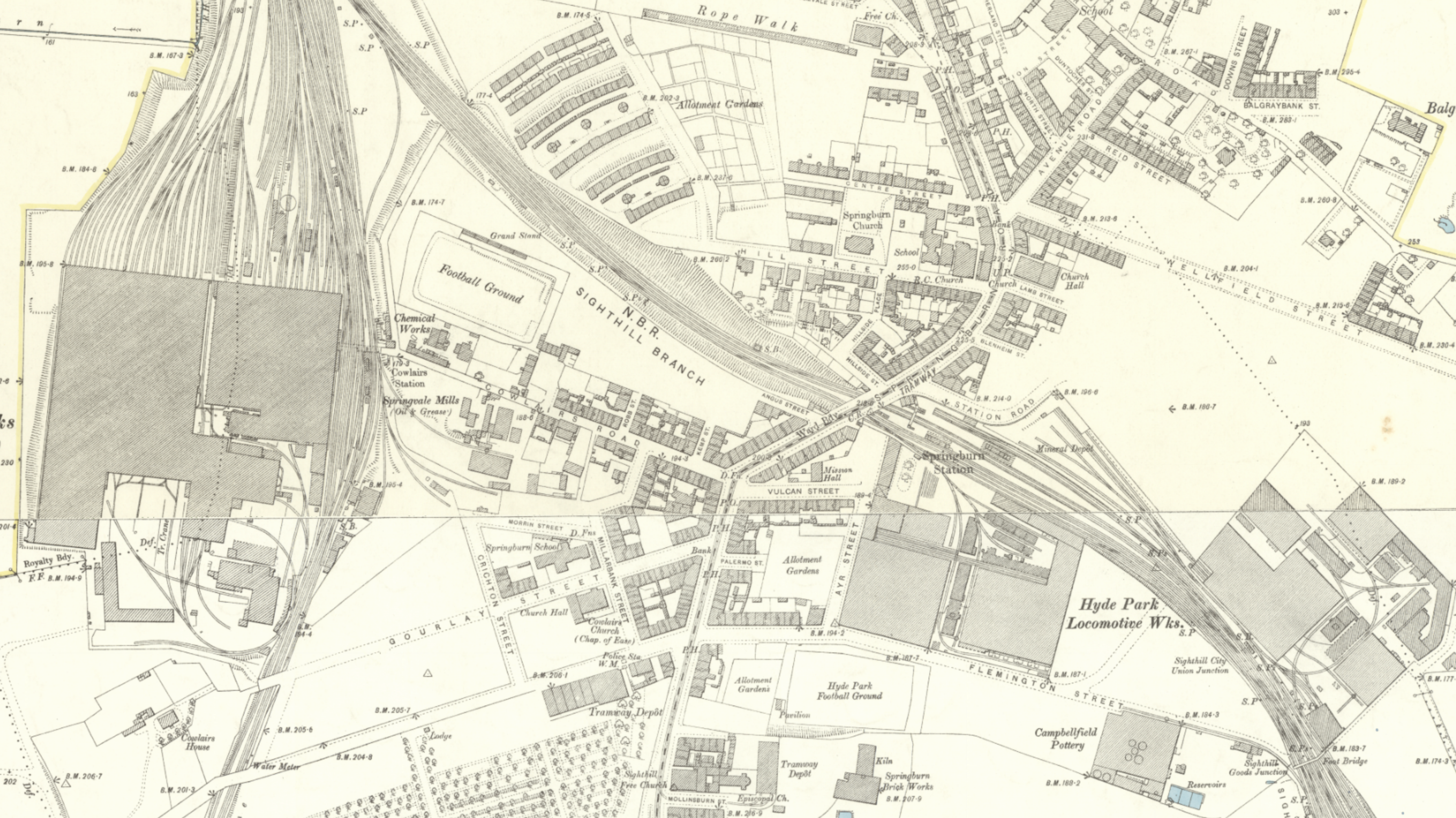
1896 Ordnance Survey map showing the Cowlairs railway works and Cowlairs F.C. football ground (left), and the Hyde Park locomotive works plus Northern's football ground (right)

The club was formed in 1874, as a football playing branch of the Northern Cricket Club, although details of their early years are largely unknown; in its second season, the club won 9 of its 14 matches. In 1883 they merged with another local team Petershill (a different club from the surviving Junior club of that name) and were founder members of the Glasgow Football Association in the same year.

The club was never particularly successful. Despite entering the Scottish Cup every season from 1875–76 to 1892–93, it only reached the fourth round on one occasion; in its second entry, in 1876–77. That run saw the club gain its biggest Cup win, 12–0 over Telegraphists, Cunningham scoring five times. The club also only reached the quarter-final of the Glasgow Cup once, in 1888–89; Northern held Queen's Park to a remarkable 5–5 draw, coming from 2–0 down to lead 5–2 at the break, and conceding a late equalizer, with loud Northern protests that the goal was offside. However Northern lost the "rough and tumble sort" of replay at Hampden Park by six goals to nil; Queen's went on to win the trophy.

Its only triumphs of note came in the Glasgow North Eastern Cup, which was largely dominated by the club's neighbour Cowlairs, which won the trophy every season bar one from 1882–83 to 1887–88; the one exception was 1884–85, in which Northern beat Cowlairs in the semi-final and then beat Thistle 5–1 in the final at Inchview. However the formation and instant success of Celtic - which beat Northern in the North-East Glasgow semi-final in 1888–89, Celtic taking its first trophy by beating Cowlairs in the final - resulted in support draining away from the much less endowed Northern. Indeed, Celtic beat Northern in the 1890–91 final, Northern only regaining the trophy after Celtic gave up entering.

Despite this lack of success, Northern was one of the five clubs which agreed to set up the Scottish Football Alliance in 1891, to provide regular league competition. After two mediocre seasons, Northern (and a number of other Alliance members) accepted an invitation to form the new Division Two of the Scottish League. 1893–94 proved to be their sole season in the league, with the club finishing ninth out of ten, and failing re-election, losing on a fourth ballot by 1 vote to Airdrieonians. It returned to the Scottish Alliance but during the course of the 1896–97 season was wound up, the final straw being an 8–1 home defeat to Royal Albert at Christmas.

Petershill Juniors were formed in summer 1897, just after Northern folded and a year after Cowlairs; due to the circumstances they could be seen as a successor representing the Springburn area, albeit their club history does not mention those clubs, only linking their formation to the demise of St Mungo's Juniors in the area.

== Colours ==
The club's original colours, as agreed at the initial meeting, were royal blue and scarlet hoops. By 1877 the club had changed to light and dark blue halved shirts with white knickers.

== Ground ==
The club originally played at Lodge Park, but opened its new ground at Hyde Park on 13 February 1875, with a game between the club's first and second elevens.

== Honours and records ==
- Glasgow North-Eastern Cup:
  - Winner: 1884–85, 1891–92
  - Runner-up: 1883–84, 1887–88, 1888–89, 1889–90, 1890–91
- Record Scottish League win: 5–2 v Abercorn
- Record Scottish League defeat: 0–7 v Cowlairs
