= Thistle F.C. =

Former association football club in Scotland

Coordinates: 55.838790°N 4.214379°W

Thistle
- Full name: Thistle Football Club
- Nicknames: The Jags, the East-Enders
- Founded: 1875
- Dissolved: 1894
- Ground: 1882–1884: Dalmarnock Park; 1884–1892: Beechwood Park, Dalmarnock; 1892–1894: Braehead Park, Oatlands
Home colours

Thistle Football Club (also known as Glasgow Thistle and Bridgeton Thistle) was a 19th-century football club based in Glasgow. The club was briefly a member of the Scottish Football League Division Two, and has been described as the most insignificant and least successful to have entered the league. It played at Braehead Park during its Scottish League season.

== History ==
=== Original club ===
The original Thistle club was among the oldest in Scotland, formed in the wake of rudimentary versions of the game played on Glasgow Green which themselves had roots in the traditional Handsel Monday holiday mass-participation events, introduced to the city by men from Callander in Perthshire. They are known to have been active with a club structure by 1868, as that year Thistle were the first opponents faced by the country's oldest documented club Queen's Park. By 1873 however the club was defunct, with many of its members joining the Eastern club.

=== Revived club ===
The revived Thistle was founded in 1875, still playing on Glasgow Green; because the club was still playing there in 1877, the club was originally turned down for membership of the Scottish FA, on the basis that the SFA did not want member clubs without their own grounds. At the time, the area was becoming both densely populated and heavily industrialised, and several aspiring teams formed among the tenements and factories. Thistle were early rivals to Clyde whose first ground was nearby at Barrowfield Park, which had been the home of Eastern until 1877.

Thistle eventually turned senior in 1878 and started to enter the Scottish Cup; the club was also a member of the Lanarkshire association, and won the Lanarkshire Cup in 1881, beating Shotts in the final by the odd goal in five, having taken advantage of a goalkeeping slip with 2 minutes to go. That season saw the club's best Scottish Cup run, reaching the final 12, albeit helped by two byes.

Thistle switched to the Glasgow Football Association in 1883 and became a founder member of the Scottish Football Alliance in 1891, by which time Celtic had been formed in the neighbourhood, quickly attracting bigger crowds.

Although they had struggled in the Alliance competition (finishing bottom of 12 teams in 1891–92 and fifth of 10 the following year), Thistle's Campbell, Mackie, and Gemmell were selected for the prestigious Glasgow v Sheffield match in 1892. Thistle were one of the clubs invited to form the new Division Two of the Scottish League for the 1893–94 season. However, the club's enforced move to Braehead Park proved costly. The new site was only a short distance away from the streets where their core support resided but on the opposite bank of the River Clyde; in previous and future decades it would have been easily accessible via Rutherglen Bridge at Shawfield, but the move took place between the demolition of the old bridge at that site (1890) and the completion of its replacement (1896), making travel more difficult during those years via a temporary wooden structure.

Thistle duly failed to make an impact in league competition, suffering some heavy defeats, including a 13–1 reverse at fellow new entrants Partick Thistle on 10 March 1894, the largest defeat in the Scottish League up to that point; it has only been exceeded by Dundee Wanderers' 15–1 loss to Airdrieonians the following season. Thistle had beaten their Partick namesakes 6–2 in the Alliance League in October 1892, but by the time they first met in the SFL, Braehead Park was said to have been in a state of disrepair and its team was struggling financially, although in that match the score was only Thistle 3–4 Partick Thistle.

Finishing bottom of the league, the club folded before the re-election meeting, despite takings of £118 at a benefit match between Sunderland and a Scottish Football League XI. Its final fixture was a friendly against Clyde.

A group of Thistle supporters almost immediately formed a new club, Strathclyde F.C., named after the street where Beechwood Park stood. They entered the Junior setup, initially playing back in Dalmarnock at New Beechwood Park and eventually settling at New Springfield Park (towards Parkhead and close to Celtic Park); they won the Scottish Junior Cup three times before eventually folding in the 1960s.

== Colours ==
The club played in 1" blue and white hooped shirts (at the time, described as stripes), and hose, and white shorts until 1886, with blue (serge) shorts thereafter.

== Grounds ==
The club started at Glasgow Green, and played across the Clyde at Shawfield in 1881–82. After returning to the north side of the river to play at Dalmarnock Park for two seasons, from 1884, the club played at Beechwood Park in the Dalmarnock district of Glasgow, fairly close to Glasgow Green (not to be confused with the ground of that name which was home to Leith Athletic F.C. in the same era).

In 1892 Thistle was unable to use Beechwood Park, and it moved back to the southern side of the river (in the Oatlands neighbourhood) to Hibernian Park, the former home of the now-defunct Glasgow Hibernian. Thistle re-christened the ground Braehead Park.

== Honours ==
- Lanarkshire Cup:
  - Winners (1): 1880–81
- Royal Standard Cup:
  - Winners (1): 1880–81
- Graham Charity Cup:
  - Winners (1): 1892–93
