= Barrowfield Park =

Football ground in Glasgow, Scotland

- Location within Glasgow council area
- Location: Glasgow, Scotland
- Coordinates: 55.8402°N 4.2216°W
- Surface: Grass
- Record attendance: 10,000

Construction
- Closed: 1898

Tenants
- Eastern (1875–1877); Clyde (1877–1898); Stonefield; Albatross

Barrowfield Park was a football ground in the Bridgeton / Dalmarnock area of Glasgow, Scotland. It was the home ground of Eastern during the 1870s and Clyde between 1877 and 1898.

== History ==
Clyde moved to Barrowfield Park in 1877, initially groundsharing with Albatross, and during the next thirteen years a cycle track was created around the pitch, an uncovered seated stand was built on the eastern side of the pitch and a pavilion erected in the south-eastern corner of the ground, whilst embankments were developed at the north and south ends of the pitch.

Clyde joined the Scottish Football League in 1891, and the first league game at Barrowfield Park was played on 15 August, with Clyde beating Vale of Leven 10–3; the scoreline remained the club's record home league win at the ground, and was also the first double-digit scoreline in SFL history. A fortnight later the ground's record league attendance was set when 10,000 watched a 7–2 defeat to Glasgow rivals Celtic. This was equalled for a Scottish Cup fifth third-round game against Rangers on 6 February 1892.

As the SFL grew in popularity, Barrowfield Park became increasingly ill-suited to hosting league football; many spectators able to get into the ground without paying and opposition clubs complained about the lack of facilities. With the club's lease about to expire, the club moved to the Shawfield Stadium in 1898. The final league game was played at Barrowfield Park on 3 January 1898, with Clyde losing 4–2 to Hibernian. The last game of any form was a friendly against Sunderland on 30 April, with the game finishing 3–3. The site was later used for housing and a school, the facade of which survives into the 21st century.

=== Continuation of the name ===
The ground's name would appear to originate from the historic Barrowfield estate which once occupied much of the surrounding area; there was also a large dye works of that name nearby. In the 1930s a housing scheme located about half a mile to the north would also take the Barrowfield name, and when local Junior club Bridgeton Waverley were displaced by this residential development, they named their replacement home in the Parkhead district 'New Barrowfield'. It later became the training ground of Celtic for many years.
