= Cowlairs F.C. =

Former association football club in Scotland

Cowlairs
- Full name: Cowlairs Football Club
- Founded: 1876
- Dissolved: 1896
- Ground: Gourlay Park, Glasgow
1876–80 colours	1880–86 colours	1893–95 colours

Cowlairs Football Club was a 19th-century football club from the Cowlairs area of Glasgow in Scotland. The club was of the founder members of the Scottish Football League in 1890, and played at Springvale Park during their time in the league.

== History ==
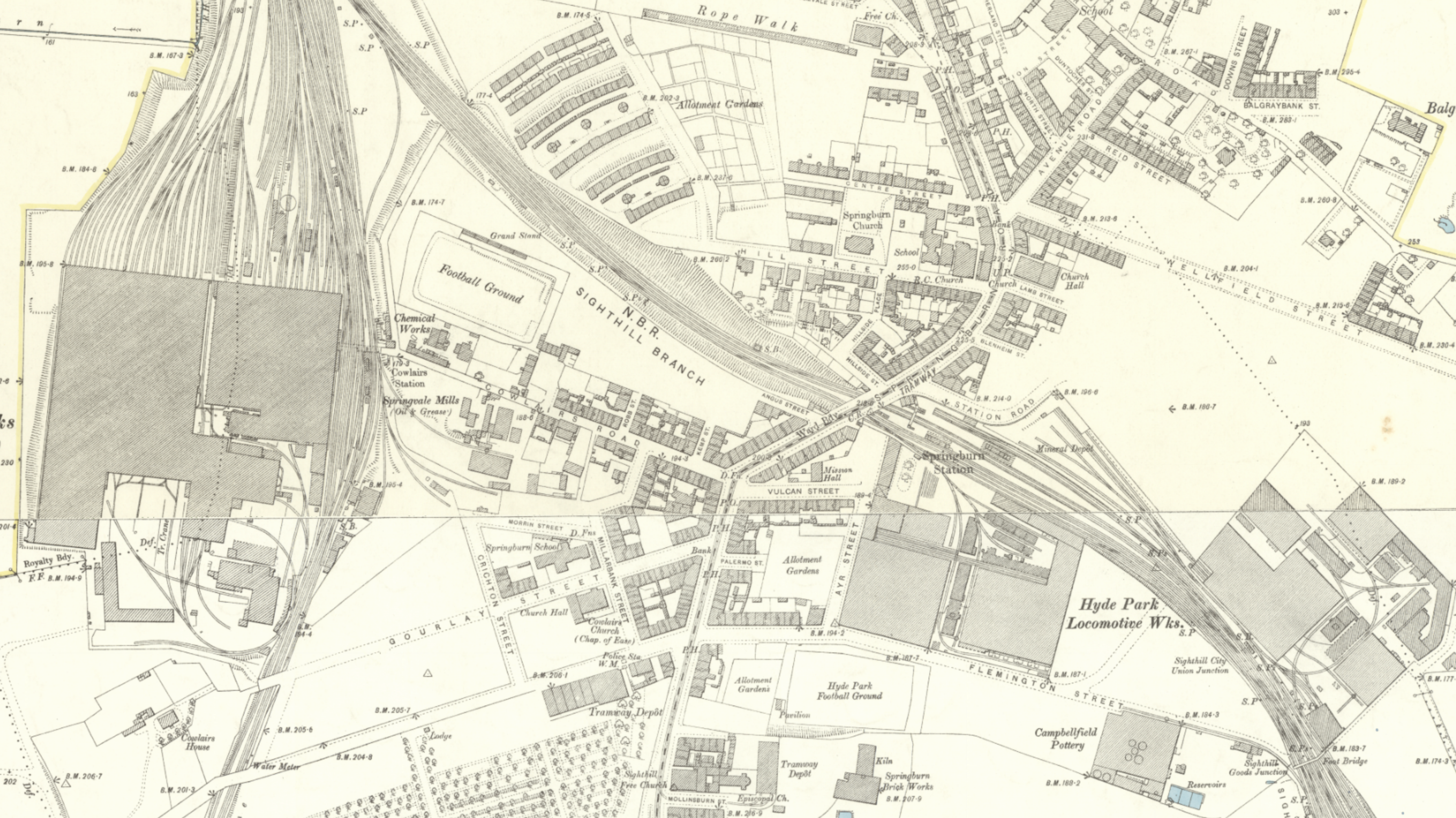
1896 Ordnance Survey map showing the Cowlairs railway works and Gourlay Park (left), and the Hyde Park locomotive works plus Northern's Hyde Park ground (right)

Cowlairs F.C. was formed in 1876 by craftsmen from the Hyde Park and Cowlairs railway works in Springburn, an area that was growing rapidly due to its importance to Glasgow's railway industry. In its early years, the club was a member of the Glasgow FA and was looked on as a junior club, at a time when "junior" clubs were simply smaller and of limited standing in the game, and prior to the establishment of a separate Junior grade of competition. The club entered the Scottish Cup for the first time in 1880–81, reaching the fourth round.

By the latter part of the decade, Cowlairs' reputation was growing. In 1886–87 they entered the English FA Cup (which was open to Scottish clubs at this time), beating Darwen Old Wanderers in the first round and Rossendale in the second; Cowlairs beat the latter by a record away score of 10–2. As the competition was regional in the first few rounds, the Scottish teams that had won through were all within the same division, and Cowlairs were drawn to fellow Glaswegians Rangers in the third round, losing 3–2 at Kinning Park, Cowlairs showing "dashing play, but unfortunately their play was not free from roughness". With the Scottish FA taking a dim view of Scots clubs playing English professional clubs, Cowlairs did not enter the FA Cup again.

The club had players of sufficient standing in this period to have two of their number gain international recognition for Scotland: Tom McInnes, capped once in 1889, and John McPherson, who won two of his nine caps while at Cowlairs, in 1889 and 1890.

Cowlairs was one of the clubs which together formed the Scottish League, but finished bottom of the table at the end of its first season, not helped by having four points deducted for fielding ineligible players. With the club also facing accusations of professionalism (which had yet to be legalised in Scottish football) following an inspection of clubs' books by the League, it was unsurprising that Cowlairs was unsuccessful in its re-election vote, losing out to Leith Athletic. Despite not being in any league competition the following season, the club enjoyed its longest Scottish Cup run, losing to Celtic in the quarter-finals.

Prior to the 1892–93 season, Cowlairs joined the Scottish Alliance, finishing as champions. Although they club failed to be elected back to the top flight of the Scottish League at the season's end, it was instead chosen to join the new Division Two for the 1893–94 season. Cowlairs were joined by relegated clubs Clyde and Abercorn, Scottish Alliance League clubs Thistle, Greenock Morton, Motherwell, Northern, Partick Thistle and Port Glasgow Athletic, as well as Hibernian. Cowlairs lost 1–0 in the final of the 1894 Glasgow Cup to Rangers.

Cowlairs' return to League football started well, securing runners-up spot that season to Hibernian; however, the club were not promoted to Division One, missing out following a ballot to third-placed Clyde. They continued to be beset by financial and administrative problems, and after finishing bottom of Division Two in 1895–96, the club were again voted out of the league. They subsequently left Springvale Park and returned to Gourlay Park. The club closed down in 1896.

Petershill Juniors were formed in summer 1897, just after Northern folded and a year after Cowlairs; due to the circumstances they could be seen as a successor representing the Springburn area, albeit their club history does not mention either club, only linking their formation to the demise of St Mungo's Juniors in the area.

== Colours ==
Cowlairs utilised a wide variety of colour schemes in its short existence, including:

- 1876 Light blue shirts, white shorts.
- 1876–80 White shirts, white shorts, black socks.
- 1880–86 Royal blue shirts, white shorts, red socks.
- 1886–88 Chocolate and light blue halved shirts, white shorts, chocolate socks with light blue trim.
- 1888–92 White shirts, dark blue shorts, dark blue socks.
- 1892 Red shirts, white shorts.
- 1893–95 Red shirts, navy blue shorts, navy blue socks.

== Ground ==
The club played at Gourlay Park, on the Cowlairs Road, a 3-minute walk from Cowlairs Station, at least from 1880 and including its League run, until the club's demise. The ground was also referred to as Springvale Park in the media in the 1890s, although the club's returns to the Scottish FA always called it Gourlay Park.

== Honours ==
- Scottish Alliance League
  - Champions 1892–93
- Glasgow North Eastern Cup
  - Winners 1883, 1884, 1886, 1888, 1889
- Glasgow Exhibition Cup
  - Winners 1888

== See also ==
- Category:Cowlairs F.C. players

== Sources ==
- Bob Crampsey (1990) The First 100 Years, Scottish Football League ISBN 0-9516433-0-4
- Dave Twydell (1993) Rejected FC Glasgow & District, York Publishing
- John Aitken (2013) The Scottish Football League 125, Scottish Non League publishing
