= King Cup (Scotland) =

- Founded: 1886
- Region: East of Scotland
- Teams: 42 (2024–25)
- Current champions: Bo'ness Athletic
- Most championships: Gala Fairydean and The Spartans (12 title)

The King Cup is an association football cup competition for members of the East of Scotland Football Association in Scotland. The competition was founded in 1886.

== Format ==
The competition is a knock-out tournament contested by the member clubs of the East of Scotland Football Association.

Since 2019–20 it has been restricted to clubs in the three divisions below the East of Scotland League's Premier Division.

== Initial entrants ==
- Adventurers
- Bellstane Birds
- Bonnyrigg Rose
- Britannic Star
- Broxburn Shamrock
- Broxburn Thistle
- Burntisland Thistle
- Champfleurie
- Cowdenbeath
- Dunfermline Athletic
- Glencairn
- Grange Athletic
- Leith Harp
- Leith Thistle
- Mossend Swifts
- Oakbank Thistle
- Polton Vale
- Queensferry Hibernian
- Sarsfield
- Uphall Bluebell
- Vale of Midlothian
- West Calder

== History ==
In 1886, the sportswear manufacturer and seller Percival King donated a cup to the Edinburgh Football Association. With no apparent use for it, a suggestion was made to form a competition for "semi-junior Edinburgh clubs", i.e. excluding Heart of Midlothian, Hibernian, St Bernards, the university, the clubs from Leith which had their own competition, and the "country" clubs which could play for county competitions. A modified version of this suggestion - that the tournament be open to all members of the Edinburgh Association, other than holders of district and charity cups - was accepted. In May 1888, the association changed its name to the East of Scotland Football Association.

The first winner was Mossend Swifts, which came from behind to beat Burntisland Thistle 4–1 in the final at Easter Road. The competition remained a leading senior trophy until the 1900s, with clubs from the Borders also being allowed to enter, but the rise of the Scottish Football League and other local leagues had the effect of some clubs withdrawing to focus on more lucrative league football and others going out of business. By 1904 the competition only had 8 entrants, none of which were in the Scottish League.

The 1912–13 competition ended in confusion. The final, between Peebles Rovers and the fourth iteration of Broxburn Shamrock, was postponed because of bad weather, and Shamrock refused to turn up to the replay, on the basis that it had already got a fixture on the scheduled date. Shamrock was duly disqualified, but rather than award the cup to Rovers, the East of Scotland FA selected Shamrock's beaten semi-final opponents - Gala Fairydean, also the Cup holders - to take its place; this "has not been received with enthusiasm in Peebles", on the basis that Fairydean had been eliminated fairly and squarely, and Rovers refused to play. The competition was therefore abandoned.

In 1946–47, the competition was played via two groups, but the format only lasted one season. The Leith Athletic reserve side was the first senior reserve side to enter, apart from a one-off appearance by St Bernard's A half-a-century before, and in 1947–48, the Hibernian B side won the competition, beating Eyemouth United 6–1 in the final.

The first winner after the COVID-19-enforced hiatus was Heriot-Watt University, who beat Livingston United 1–0 after extra time. Lochore Welfare lifted the trophy for the first time in 2022–23, with a 2–1 win over Dunipace at Whitburn's Central Park, having eliminated the holders in the second round.

== Winners ==
- 1886–87: Mossend Swifts (1)
- 1887–88: Mossend Swifts (2)
- 1888–89: Broxburn (formerly Thistle) (1)
- 1889–90: Armadale [1880]
- 1890–91: Raith Rovers
- 1891–92: Bathgate Rovers
- 1892–93: Bo'ness (1)
- 1893–94: Cowdenbeath (1)
- 1894–95: Polton Vale
- 1895–96: Mossend Swifts (3)
- 1896–97: St Bernard's A
- 1897–98: Cowdenbeath (2)
- 1898–99: Raith Rovers (2)
- 1899–1900: Cowdenbeath (3)
- 1900–01: Raith Rovers (3)
- 1901–02: Lochgelly United
- 1902–03: Hearts of Beath
- 1903–04: Bathgate (1)
- 1904–05: Bathgate (2)
- 1905–06: Bathgate (3)
- 1906–07: West Lothian Albion
- 1907–08: Peebles Rovers (1)
- 1908–09: Berwick Rangers (1)
- 1909–10: West Calder Swifts
- 1910–11: Gala Fairydean (1)
- 1911–12: Gala Fairydean (2)
- 1912–13: final unplayed
- 1913–14: Gala Fairydean (3)
- 1919–20: Bo'ness (2)
- 1920–21: Civil Service (Strtollers) (1)
- 1921–22: Vale of Leithen (1)
- 1922–23: Leith Athletic
- 1923–24: Berwick Rangers (2)
- 1924–25: Civil Service Strollers (2)
- 1925–26: Berwick Rangers (3)
- 1926–27: Civil Service Strollers (3)
- 1927–28: Berwick Rangers (4)
- 1928–29: Gala Fairydean (4)
- 1929–30: Armadale [1910]
- 1930–31: Penicuik Athletic (1)
- 1931–32: Penicuik Athletic (2)
- 1932–33: Berwick Rangers (5)
- 1933–34: Clerwood Amateurs
- 1934–35: Duns (1)
- 1935–36: Penicuik Athletic (3)
- 1936–37: Vale of Leithen (2)
- 1937–38: Penicuik Athletic (4)
- 1938–39: Duns (2)
- 1946-47: Gala Fairydean (5)
- 1947–48: Hibernian B (1)
- 1948–49: Hibernian B (2)
- 1949–50: Heart of Midlothian B (1)
- 1950–51: Heart of Midlothian B (2)
- 1951–52: Heart of Midlothian B (3)
- 1952–53: Peebles Rovers (2)
- 1953–54: Peebles Rovers (3)
- 1954–55: unfinished
- 1955–56: Vale of Leithen (3)
- 1956–57: unfinished
- 1957–58: Duns (3)
- 1959–60: Vale of Leithen (4)
- 1960–61: Gala Fairydean (6)
- 1961–62: Peebles Rovers (4)
- 1962–63: Peebles Rovers (5)
- 1963–64: Duns (4)
- 1964–65: Gala Fairydean (7)
- 1965–66: Gala Fairydean (8)
- 1966-67: Hawick Royal Albert (1)
- 1967–68: Coldstream
- 1968–69: Gala Fairydean (9)
- 1969–70: Heart of Midlothian 'Colts' (4)
- 1970–71: Heart of Midlothian 'Colts' (5)
- 1971–72: Gala Fairydean (10)
- 1972–73: Hibernian 'Colts' (3)
- 1973–74: The Spartans (1)
- 1974–75: Selkirk (1)
- 1975–76: Selkirk (2)
- 1976–77: Edinburgh University (1)
- 1977–78: The Spartans (2)
- 1978–79: no competition
- 1979–80: Kelso United
- 1980–81: Berwick Rangers reserves
- 1981–82: Hawick Royal Albert (2)
- 1982–83: Whitehill Welfare (1)
- 1983–84: Hawick Royal Albert (3)
- 1984–85: Postal United (1)
- 1985–86: Vale of Leithen (5)
- 1986–87: Vale of Leithen (6)
- 1987–88: The Spartans (3)
- 1988–89: Gala Fairydean (11)
- 1989–90: Berwick Rangers reserves (2)
- 1990–91: Civil Service Strollers (4)
- 1991–92: Vale of Leithen (7)
- 1992–93: Whitehill Welfare (2)
- 1993–94: Whitehill Welfare (3)
- 1994–95: Whitehill Welfare (4)
- 1995–96: Whitehill Welfare (5)
- 1996–97: Craigroyston
- 1997–98: Whitehill Welfare (6)
- 1998–99: Edinburgh City (formerly Postal United) (2)
- 1999–00: Edinburgh City (3)
- 2000–01: The Spartans (4)
- 2001–02: The Spartans (5)
- 2002–03: The Spartans (6)
- 2003–04: Lothian Thistle
- 2004–05: The Spartans (7)
- 2005–06: The Spartans (8)
- 2006–07: Edinburgh University (1)
- 2007–08: The Spartans (9)
- 2008–09: Heriot-Watt University (1)
- 2009–10: The Spartans (10)
- 2010–11: The Spartans (11)
- 2011–12: Stirling University
- 2012–13: The Spartans (12)
- 2013–14: Edinburgh University (2)
- 2014–15: Peebles Rovers (6)
- 2015–16: Leith Athletic [1996]
- 2016–17: Leith Athletic [1996] (2)
- 2017–18: Kelty Hearts
- 2018–19: Tranent
- 2019–20: unfinished
- 2020–21: no competition
- 2021–22: Heriot-Watt University (2)
- 2022–23: Lochore Welfare
- 2023–24: Heriot-Watt University (3)
- 2024–25: Bo'ness Athletic
