= Armadale Volunteers F.C. =

Former association football club in Scotland

Armadale Volunteers
- Nickname(s): the Volunteers
- Founded: 1887
- Dissolved: 1900
- Ground: Volunteer Park
- Secretary: J. Gordon, James Greig
colours

Armadale Volunteers F.C. was an association football club from Armadale, West Lothian, active in the 1890s.

== History ==
Although it is claimed that the West Lothian club was formed in 1881, when the Armadale Star club wanted to use Volunteer Park and was effectively taken over by the Volunteer movement of the British Army, there is no record of either club before 1887.

The Volunteers reached the semi-final of the M'Lagan Junior Cup for clubs in the shire in 1887–88, losing to Cardross Swifts in a match interrupted by crowd violence. It did however win the Linlithgowshire Junior Cup the next season, getting revenge over Cardross Swifts with a 2–0 win in the final at Erin Rovers' ground, thanks to goals from Riddell and Christison. The club also won the less prestigious Moffat Cup (for clubs in the Broxburn area) in 1893–94 and 1894–95.

The 1894–95 season saw the club's best run in the Scottish Junior Cup, reaching the fourth round. Evidently the Volunteers felt ready to take a step up to senior level in 1895, the year after the town's previous senior club, Armadale, had dissolved; it joined the Scottish Football Association at the start of 1895, having entered the three major local competitions - the East of Scotland Shield, the King Cup, and Linlithgowshire Cup at the start of the season. A number of Armadale players, including Gallacher, Clemenson, Prentice, Ramsay, Morrison, and M'Laren, found their way into the Volunteer side.

In 1894–95, the club reached the final of the Linlithgowshire - albeit by now the competition only had six entries - and lost 3–0 against Bo'ness at Linlithgow. The club also took eventual King Cup winners Mossend Swifts to a replay in the King Cup semi-final.

The club's greatest honour in the year however came in the Linlithgowshire League, a successor competition to the East of Scotland League, which only took place in 1895–96. The League only had 4 clubs (Bo'ness, Linlithgow Athletic, and Bathgate, and no club completed its fixtures, but, after the Volunteers won all of its 5 matches, including an 8–2 revenge win over Bo'ness, it was uncatchable at the top of the table. The trophy awarded was the 2nd XI Cup, which had been repurposed after that tournament was considered redundant.

After a promising opening to a senior career, the club added the Scottish Qualifying Cup and the new Linlithgow Charity Cup (also known as the Gardener's Cup) to its schedule in 1896–97. The Volunteers beat Broxburn Shamrock in the first round of the Qualifying, losing at Penicuik Athletic in the second. The club was something of a bugbear for the Shamrock during the season, beating it in the East of Scotland Shield, but, most importantly, beating Shamrock in the final of the Linlithgowshire Cup. The club completed a cup double by beating Bathgate in a replay in the final of the Gardener's Cup, 3–0 at Bathgate.

The pressures of professionalism and local clubs in the Scottish League had however decimated the smaller clubs and the Volunteers never reached such heights again. It was runner-up in the 1897–98 Linlithgowshire Cup, but only after Bathgate withdrew rather than play Bo'ness, and the Volunteers won a repêchage semi-final against Bellstane Birds. It also reached the semi-final of the East of Scotland Shield, by now denuded of the major Edinburgh clubs, losing 5–1 to Raith Rovers, but did not win another competitive match before disbanding in 1900. An attempt later in the year to form a new senior club fell flat and the town had to wait until 1910 for the formation of the next Armadale F.C.

== Colours ==
The club wore black and gold shirts and white knickers.

== Ground ==
The club played at Volunteer Park.

== Honours ==
- Linlithgowshire Cup (Rosebery Cup)
  - Winner: 1896–97
  - Runner-up: 1895–96, 1897–98
- Linlithgowshire Charity Cup (Gardener's Cup)
  - Winner: 1896–97
- Linlithgowshire League
  - Winner: 1895–96
- Linlithgowshire Junior Cup
  - Winner: 1888–89
