= Norton Park F.C. =

Former association football club in Scotland

Norton Park
- Full name: Norton Park Football Club
- Nickname(s): the N.P.
- Founded: 1881
- Dissolved: 1890
- Ground: Norton Park
- Match Secretary: George Bethune
Home colours

Norton Park Football Club was a Scottish association football club based in Edinburgh.

== History ==
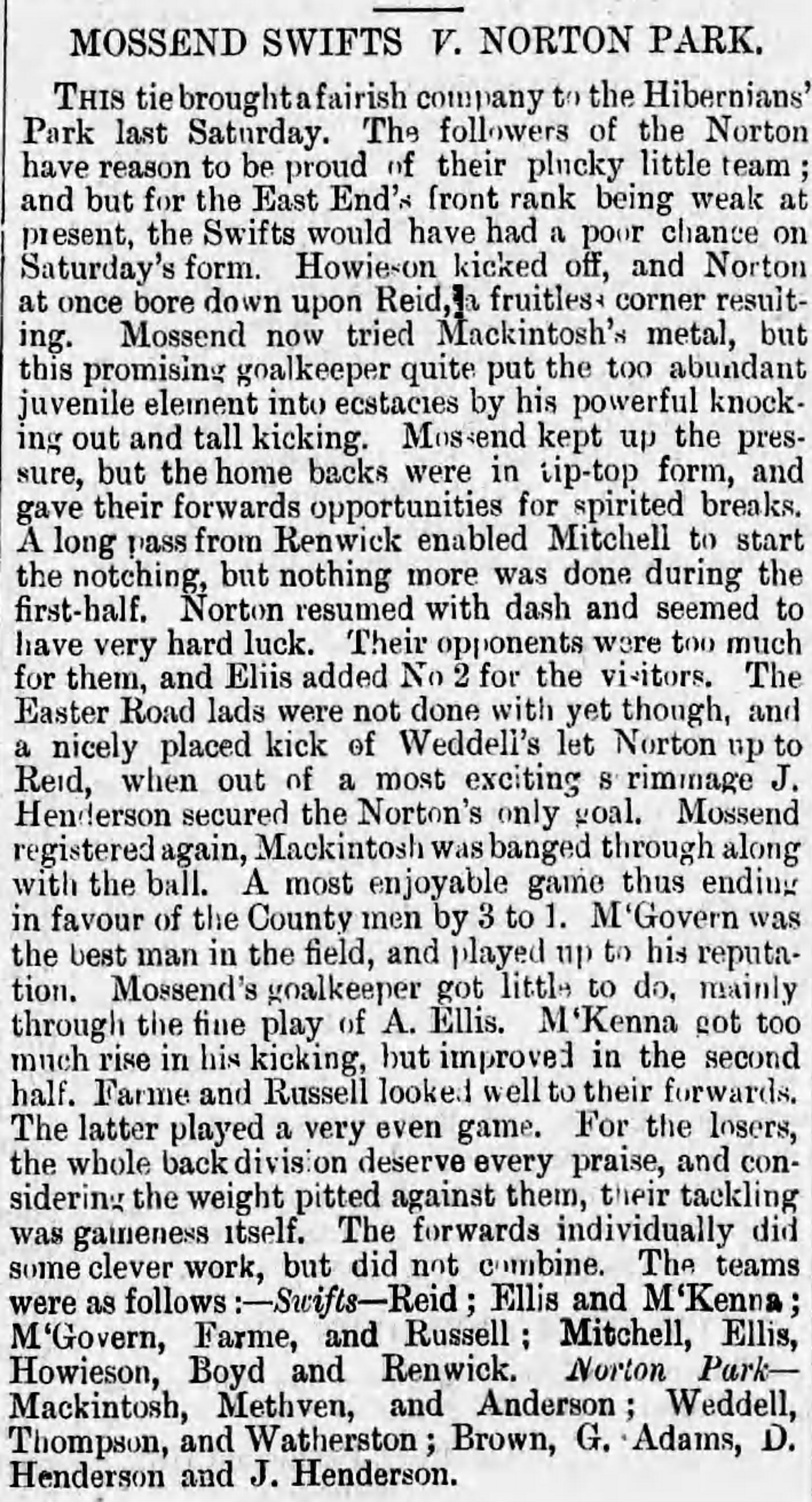
1887–88 King Cup Semi-final, Mossend Swifts 3–1 Norton Park, West Lothian Courier, 18 February 1888

The club was founded in 1881 and took its name from a park near to its first ground, and where the club ended up playing.

The club entered the Edinburgh Shield in its first season, and continued to enter every season until 1890–91. In 1883–84, the club lost in the first round to Hibernian, but only by 4 goals to 1, and having taken a surprise lead; in the Consolation Cup, for clubs eliminated before the main competition's final, Norton Park had its best run, reaching the semi-final against Bo'ness. Norton Park lost the tie 3–1, but obtained a replay after protesting the Bonessians' rough play. It was to no avail - Bo'ness won 2–0 in a "spirited" game.

After this minor success, in the summer of 1884 the club joined the Scottish Football Association, and entered the Scottish Cup for the first time in 1884–85, losing 3–0 at West Calder in the first round, in a match which was "fast" but "not at all rough".

The club entered the Cup for six seasons, but only won 2 ties; it withdrew from its first round tie at Newcastleton in 1886–87 as it was unable to travel the distance. Its first win came in 1885–86 when it beat Glencairn 6–1, but lost 7–1 at Bo'ness in the second round.

In 1887–88, the club had the daunting task of visiting Tynecastle Park to play Heart of Midlothian in the first round. As with the Hibs game, the club lost 4–1, but again with some honour, Laing equalizing an early Hearts goal.

The Park was more successful in local competitions in which smaller clubs entered. It was one of the entrants to the first Percival King Cup in 1886–87, a competition for clubs in the east of Scotland, which excluded the larger Edinburgh sides. The club reached the semi-final in 1887–88, going down 3–1 to eventual winners Mossend Swifts, the match being held at the Hibs' Easter Road ground.

The club lost a number of its players at the end of the season, and there were rumours that it would break up in toto, but it managed not only to provide an XI for its 1888–89 Scottish Cup first round tie at Bellstane Birds, but won 3–2, two goals from new forward Balsali helping the club to a decisive 3–0 lead, the Birds only scoring in the last 15 minutes. The club lost 3–1 at St Bernards in the second round, taking the lead through John Adams; but Adams blotted his copybook by punching a St Bernards shot off the line, which, under the rules used at the time, resulted in St Bernards being awarded a goal, and the game ended 3–1 in the Saints' favour.

The club lost even more players over the summer to clubs offering appropriate inducements, and the N.P.'s last full season was 1889–90. Its final tie in the Scottish Cup was a defeat to Bellstane Birds, who recorded a 6–3 victory; it was the Birds' only win in the main rounds of the competition. That only nine players turned up for a friendly at Champfleurie in October showed the difficulties the club was in, and a home friendly in January with West Calder was held up for an hour while the club tried to find eleven players. The club was humiliated in the King Cup by Broxburn, losing 14–1; even the consolation goal was a fluke, from a double deflection. Norton Park nearly did not see out the season, initially scratching from the East of Scotland Consolation Cup, but eventually putting a team out to lose to Adventurers on 29 March 1890.

The club did not pay its subscription for 1890–91 and the Scottish FA struck it from the membership roll in August 1890. Norton Park continued into the season as a junior side, but after losing in the first round of the Shield at Dunfermline Athletic (by the unusual score of 8–4), the club did not play again.

== Colours ==
The club's colours were blue and white "perpendicular striped" jerseys, white knickers, and blue hose.

== Ground ==
The club originally played on a ground off Lovers' Lane in Edinburgh. In 1885 it moved to Norton Park itself, at 78 Easter Road in Edinburgh. The club had to spend the 1886–87 season at Hawkhill before securing a rent again at Easter Road, which "is by no means as level as Hawkhill, but at least is within the bounds of civilisation".

== Notable players ==
- George Thallon, later of King's Park and Falkirk, centre-forward (and occasional goalkeeper) for the club for nearly 2 seasons in the mid-1880s
