= Broxburn Shamrock F.C. (1881) =

Former association football club in Scotland

Broxburn Shamrock
- Full name: Broxburn Shamrock Football Club
- Nicknames: the Shamrock, the Green 'Uns
- Founded: 1881
- Dissolved: 1889
- Ground: Easter Park
- Hon. Secretary: Francis Kane
Home colours

Broxburn Shamrock F.C. was an association football club from Broxburn in West Lothian.

== History ==
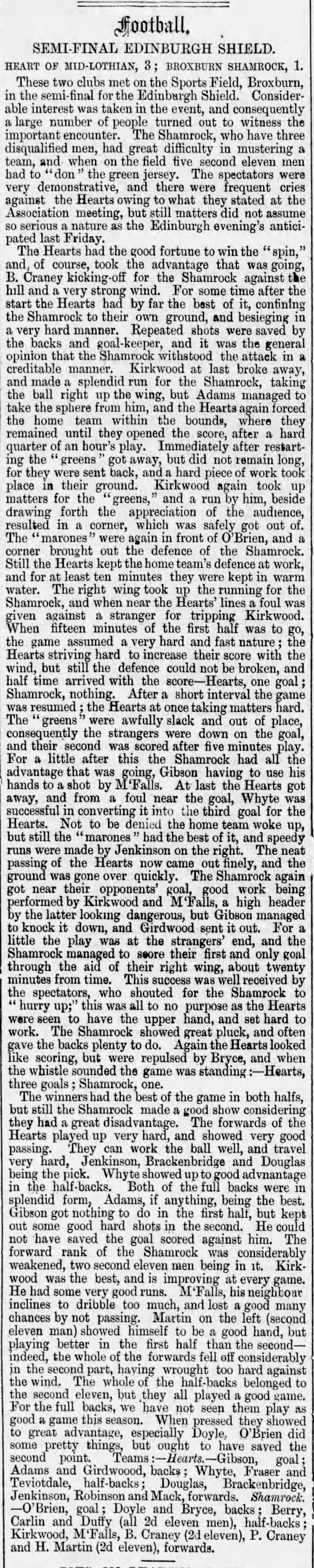
1886–87 Edinburgh Shield semi-final, Broxburn Shamrock 1–3 Heart of Midlothian, from the Lothian Courier, 29 January 1887

The club was founded in 1881 and was the first of at least four senior clubs to bear the Broxburn Shamrock name. Its first recorded match was a 1–0 defeat at Bellstane Birds in October 1881; the following month saw the club's first recorded win, over Addiewell.

=== Early competitions ===
It first came to attention in the Edinburgh Shield in 1883–84. Although the club was eliminated in the second round, it had a promising run in the Consolation Cup, for sides which had been knocked out in the main competition. After Selkirk failed to turn up to the quarter-final tie, the Shamrock faced Armadale in the semi-final, and was beaten 5–0. However the Shamrock protested that the Armadale captain had not handed to the referee a list of the players, and the Consolation Cup committee disqualified the Dale, putting the Shamrock into the final against Bo'ness. The final went to a replay, which Bo'ness won 4–0.

The club's rivalry with Armadale continued with a win in the Edinburgh Shield first round in 1884–85, put down to the Shamrock importing players from Edinburgh and Airdrie. Armadale gained a revenge by beating the Shamrock in the Consolation Cup that year, and a more important one in the Linlithgowshire Cup in 1885–86; it was the second year of the county competition and the two clubs met in the final, which the Dale won 2–1 with a goal in the last 90 seconds.

=== Scottish Cup ===
The Shamrock had at least the consolation of turning senior at the start of the 1885–86 season, and therefore entering the Scottish Cup for the first time. It was however a competition in which the club did not have any success. It entered from 1885–86 to 1888–89, and never won a tie. The Shamrock did reach the second round in 1887–88, having lost 4–0 to Mossend Swifts in the first round, but the Swifts were disqualified for the non-registration of Dickson before the tie. The Shamrock went out 4–1 to St Bernard's in a second round replay, even though the Saints lost Low through injury for part of the match, McFaulds scoring for Shamrock 30 seconds from time.

=== Local competitions ===
In 1886–87, the club had its best run in the competition; it survived a protest from Bo'ness for fielding players from outside the county, on the basis that there was no rule against it. In the third round, against expectations, the Shamrock beat Mossend Swifts 4–2, albeit "a dirtier game has not for a long time been seen in this county". Mossend protested on the grounds of rough play, and referee Smith complained that, when he gave a decision against the Shamrock, he was surrounded by five or six players, plus the Shamrock umpire. The Edinburgh association declined to punish the club, but Turner, Mulvey, and C. McFaulds were suspended from the competition, and umpire Slaven - said to be "the worst referee ever seen on a football field" - was barred from officiating again.

With Shamrock missing three key players, the Swifts gained a significant revenge against it in the King Cup (for clubs outside Edinburgh in the East of Scotland area) - after the Shamrock protested a 3–1 defeat on the basis that the Royal Gymnasium pitch was unfit, the Swifts had no mercy in the second match, winning 10–0, in a match that was paradoxically played "on the friendliest terms".

It is possible that the players' attention was elsewhere, as the following week the Shamrock was to play Armadale in the semi-final of the Linlithgowshire Cup. Shamrock did not enjoy the luck of the Irish, as the referee did not turn up, and the match - which lasted an hour, and which Shamrock won 2–1 - was declared a friendly.

Before the match could be played out, the club had to take on the mighty Heart of Midlothian in the semi-final of the Edinburgh Shield. The Hearts asked in vain for the semi-final to be played on neutral ground, but with the Greens having to field five reserves, the result was not considered to be in any doubt; that the score was only 3–1 to Hearts was considered a "good show". The Shamrock did not recover in time for the Linlithgowshire semi-final on the Sports Field, which Armadale won 4–2, the fourth goal being a breakaway in the 85th minute as Shamrock looked for the equalizer; notably, "although some foul work took place", the game was played in a "friendly spirit".

=== Disqualification and end of the club ===
However, the club could not take advantage in 1887–88. Its Scottish Cup replay with St Bernard's was played under protest, as the Saints recognized "James Martin" of the Shamrock side as being one John Potter, a player for Uphall Bluebell. For fielding a player under an assumed name, the Shamrock was disqualified from SFA membership for the season.

It had been assumed that the club was consequently dissolved, but to "great surprise" the Shamrock reorganized. However the club had been badly affected by the suspension - it suffered a further temporary suspension for not paying expenses to Bo'ness - and 1888–89 was the club's last season. It had an unwanted hat-trick by losing in the Scottish Cup, Linlithgowshire Cup, and Edinburgh Shield after having wins overturned and ties replayed:

- in the Scottish Cup, the club beat West Calder 3–2 in the first round, but the tie was held to be a friendly as the referee did not turn up, and the tie was played off at West Calder instead, the home side winning 2–1;
- in the Linlithgowshire, the club beat Champfleurie 3–1 in the first round, but a replay was ordered, and, after two draws, Champfleurie won the tie 7–0;
- in the Edinburgh Shield, the club beat Edinburgh University 5–3 in the third round, but the students protested that the match was not played on the Shamrock's private ground, the match being held at Sports Field, which had been 'transferred' to the sole use of Broxburn F.C. (formerly Broxburn Thistle), and a replay was ordered to take place at the university's ground in Corstorphine, which the university won 4–2.

The club's catastrophic run of maladministration continued in the King Cup, being disqualified after beating Linlithgow Athletic 7–1 in the first round for fielding an unregistered player. The final indignity for the club came at the hands of the Broxburn club - in January 1889 the Shamrock's first and second XIs lost to Broxburn's respective XIs 5–0 and 6–2 respectively, and the last record of a Shamrock match is the 2nd XI's defeat to Broxburn by 7 goals to 1 in the Linlithgow 2nd XI Cup two months later.

Shamrock did not pay its subscription for the 1889–90 season, so was thrown off the roll of senior clubs. In 1891, a new club with the same name was formed, with a different ground, slightly different uniform, and different committee, as a "resuscitation" of the Shamrock.

== Colours ==
The club's colours were originally green jerseys, white knickerbockers, and green stockings. In 1887 the club changed its knickers to blue, and for its last season to green and black.

== Ground ==
The club originally played at Easter Park, one mile from the station. In 1886 the club moved to Sports Park and the following season it registered Shamrock Park as its home, although it kept playing out matches at Sports Park.

The Greens' highest recorded crowd was 800, for a Scottish Cup tie with Mossend Swifts in September 1886, the Linlithgowshire semi-final with Armadale in 1887, and the Scottish Cup replay with St Bernard's in 1887.

== Honours ==
- Linlithgowshire Cup/Rosebery Cup:
  - Runners-up: 1885–86
- East of Scotland Consolation Cup:
  - Runners-up: 1883–84

== Notable players ==
- Dan Doyle, club captain in 1886–87
