= West Lothian Albion F.C. =

Association football club in Scotland

West Lothian Albion
- Nickname(s): the Albion
- Founded: 1906
- Dissolved: 1913
- Ground: Niddry Sports Park
- President: John Black
- Hon. Secretary: Patrick D'Alton
- Match Secretary: Andrew Mabon
1906–08 colours	1908–10 colours

West Lothian Albion F.C. was an association football club from Winchburgh, West Lothian.

== History ==
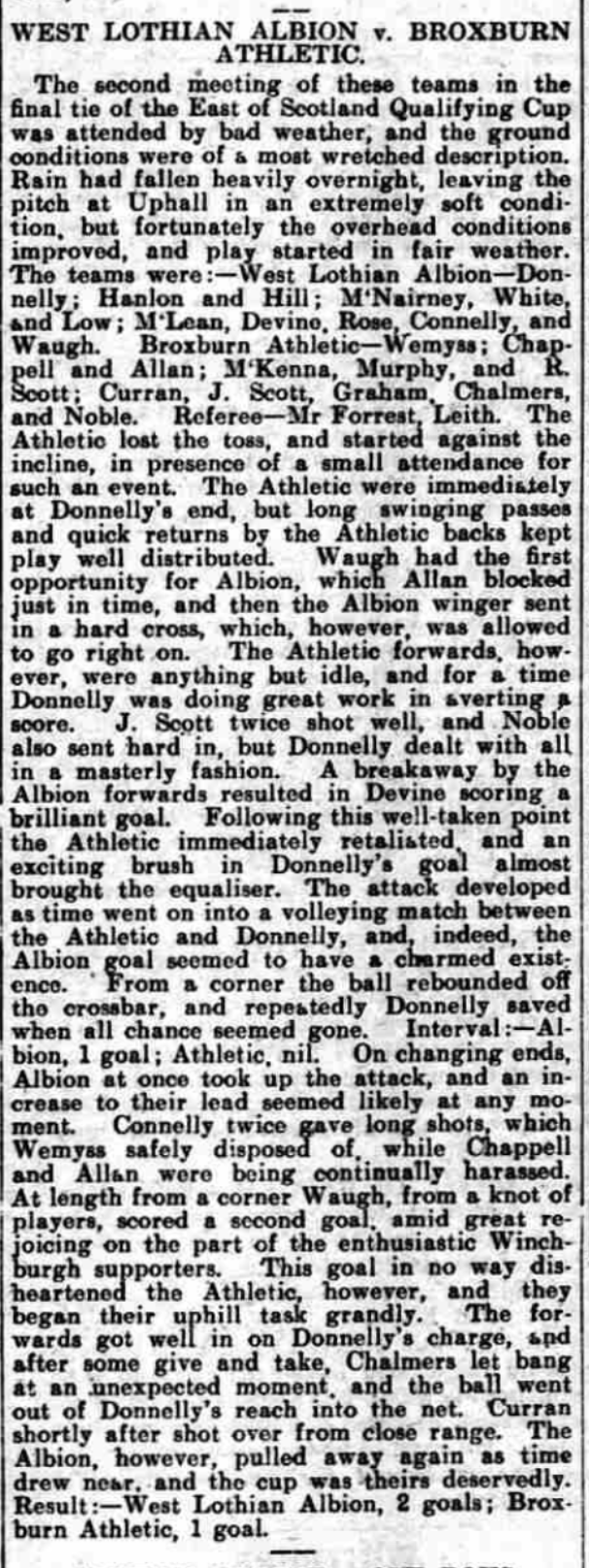
1907–08 East of Scotland Qualifying Cup Final, West Lothian Albion 2–1 Broxburn Athletic, Linlithgow Gazette, 15 November 1907

The club was founded in April 1906, thanks to funding from the Oakbank Oil Company, and the consequent growth of Winchburgh from a village to a small town, which provided enough of a population to support a senior football club. The club's original president, John Black, was a works manager for the oil company, and the company also provided a free ground.

The club was admitted to the East of Scotland Football Association almost on foundation and soon afterwards joined the Scottish Football Association, signing William White, Peter Lowe, Charles Devine, and Dan Clark from Broxburn, Nugent and Pat Finnigan from Broxburn Shamrock, and the ex-Hibernian player Mackay from Linlithgow Rose. Even before playing a match, the club applied to join the Scottish Football Union, but lost out in the vote; it did however gain election to the Eastern League, replacing the moribund Adventurers.

Its debut season was successful. The Eastern League did not complete, with the Albion winning 4 and losing 3 of its 7 matches, to be level on points with the Heart of Midlothian "A" at the top of the table. Although it narrowly lost to Bathgate in the first round of the Linlithgowshire Cup, and its run in the East of Scotland qualifying cup ruined by multiple protests, it won the King Cup, beating Vale of Leithen 2–1 in the final at Peebles, Devine scoring the winner from the penalty-spot.

The first season however was the club's best. The Eastern League morphed into the Midland League, but the Albion had two mediocre seasons before the league reduced to three clubs. The Albion did win the East of Scotland Qualifying Cup in 1907–08, its run including a 7–0 win at home to Broxburn Shamrock, but lost to the same Broxburn Athletic side in the competition proper that it had beaten in the Qualifying final. After 1909, it only won one more cup match, 3–2 at Armadale in the 1910–11 King Cup.

The club also entered the Scottish Qualifying Cup every season from 1906–07 to 1912–13, but never won through to the Scottish Cup itself; it was generally unlucky with the draw, twice going out to Scottish League club Leith Athletic. Its only win in the competition was in its first match – a 4–1 win at West Calder Swifts, having gone behind early on.

By the 1911–12 season the club was close to bankrupt. The club desultorily played its cup ties in the season "to clear their feet financially, before stopping operations altogether", a sign of the club's decline being defeats to the obscure Amphion Amateurs in the King Cup and the East of Scotland Qualifying Cup. It entered the Scottish Qualifying Cup and the East of Scotland equivalent in 1912–13, on the basis that it would be easier to scratch and retain membership hoping for a recovery, than resign and then try to re-join; the club duly scratched from both competitions before playing in either. Although it was allowed to retain its membership of both associations, the club does not seem to have played in 1912–13 at all, and its resignation from the Scottish FA in August 1913 was the club's coup de grâce.

The name was revived in 1925 for a juvenile club.

== Colours ==
The club originally wore dark blue jerseys with white shorts, and dark blue stockings with white rings. The club changed in 1908 to maroon shirts, white shorts, and black socks. From 1910 to 1912 the club wore blue jerseys.

== Ground ==
The club played at the Niddry Sports Field. The club's tie with Bathgate in the Linlithgowshire Cup in March 1907 attracted a crowd of 2,000, although when the club hosted Leith in the Qualifying Cup second round in 1906, over a thousand of the 1,500 crowd were supporters of the visitors.
