= Polton Vale F.C. =

Association football club in Scotland

Polton Vale
- Full name: Polton Vale Football Club
- Nickname(s): the Vale
- Founded: 1886
- Dissolved: 1902
- Ground: Loanhead Park
1886–94 colours	1897–1902 colours

Polton Vale Football Club was a football club from the town of Loanhead, Midlothian, Scotland. The club played in the Scottish Cup in the 1890s and had some success at local level, but was thrown off the club register in 1902.

== History ==
The first recorded match for the club was in the King Cup, for members of the East of Scotland Football Association, in 1886.

=== Rise and Consolation Cup successes ===
The club first rose to prominence with an unexpected run to the semi-final of the Edinburgh Shield in 1888–89; the Vale's quarter-final win over Cowdenbeath, in a twice-replayed tie, was considered a particular surprise. The club lost the semi-final 11–0 against Heart of Midlothian.

The club's first success of note was in the Shield's Consolation Cup (for clubs knocked out before the final) in 1890–91, beating Penicuik Athletic 3–2 in the final. This success led to a nomination that the club be one of the four that would be exempt to the fifth round of the Shield the following season, but Vale came bottom of the six nominated clubs in the ballot.

The club's growing ambitions were shown by its first entry to the Scottish Cup in 1891–92, although by then the competition had introduced preliminary rounds, and the club did not make it through to the first round proper in its first three seasons. At the end of the 1891–92 season, the Vale applied to join the Eastern Alliance; however the competition would not be revived until 1893–94, when the club was admitted, but the competition did not start until late in the season, and was left uncompleted, with the Vale 3rd out of 7 teams, but well behind leaders Broxburn Shamrock.

The club again reached the semi-final of the Shield in 1892–93, and again won the Consolation Cup; the club had to win 8 ties in order to take the trophy, its defeat in the main competition being again to Hearts (albeit this time only 5–0). The club beat Bathgate Rovers in the final at New Logie Green 4–2, indebted to some brilliant goalkeeping from Leitch. One notable occurrence during the run was that a protest by Mossend Swifts against the Vale's quarter-final win, because of bad weather affecting the match, was dismissed at a subsequent hearing by the Swifts' own club secretary Mr Williamson, his honesty "stand[ing] out as bold example as to how representatives should conduct themselves".

=== 1894–95: King Cup triumph ===
1894–95 proved to be the club's best season. It reached the Shield semi-final for the third time, albeit at the start of the season the Edinburgh clubs in the Scottish League withdrew from the East of Scotland FA, and did not take part in the competition again. In the semi-final the club lost 1–0 to Adventurers of Edinburgh. The club however gained consolation by winning the King Cup for the only time, beating Raith Rovers 2–1 in the final at Bonnyrigg; one consequence of the triumph was the club had to withdraw from the Shield's Consolation Cup.

The club also reached the first round proper of the 1894–95 Scottish Cup, beating Falkirk 8–2 in the qualifying stages. The first round draw sent the Vale to Ayr Parkhouse, where the home side won 5–3 in a "not specially interesting" game.

=== 1895–96: double runners-up ===
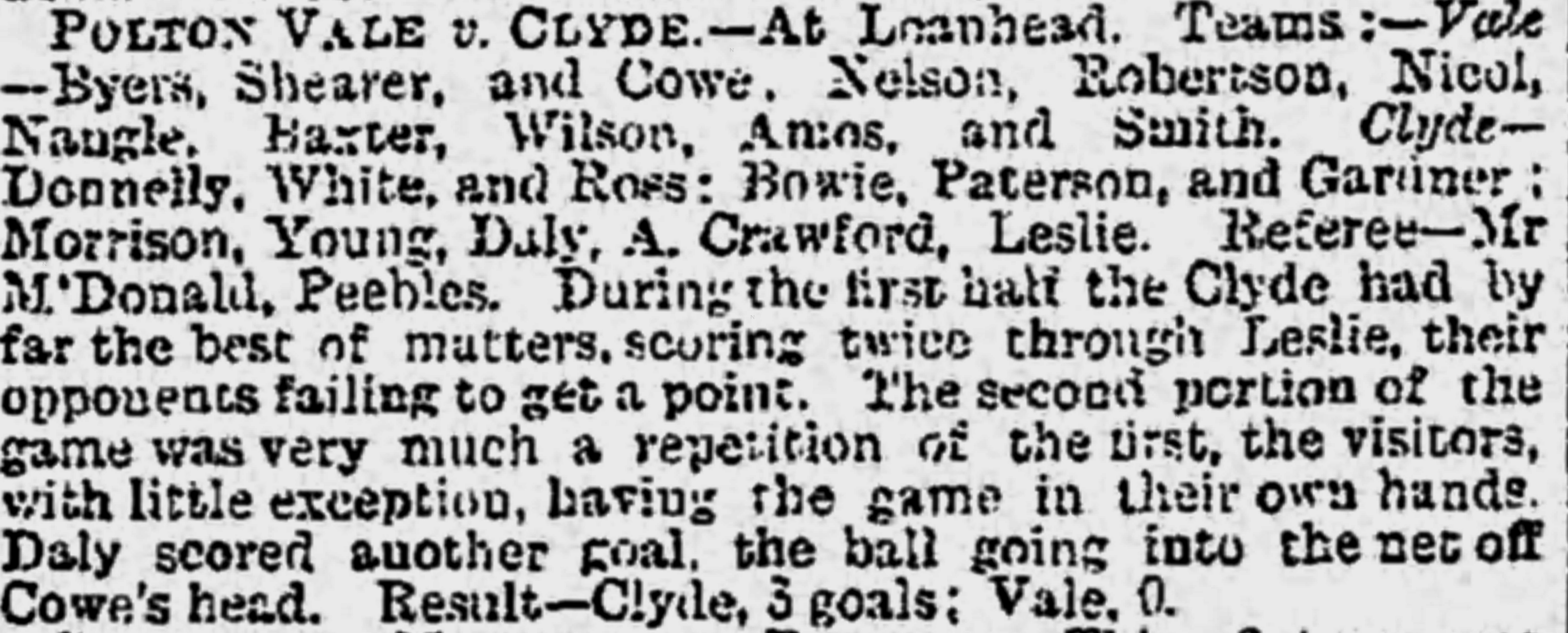
Polton Vale 0–3 Clyde, Scottish Cup First Round, 1895–96; from the Glasgow Herald, 13 January 1896

The club came close to retaining the King Cup, reaching the final, but losing to Mossend Swifts by 4 goals to 1 in front of 2,000 spectators at Bathgate. The Vale protested, but, because the protest was served on the Swifts too late, the East of Scotland FA dismissed it.

The Vale also reached the final of the Shield - now called the East of Scotland Shield - for the only time, and faced Mossend Swifts again, this time at Tynecastle Park but in front of only 1,000. It looked as if the Vale had gained revenge over the Swifts with a 2–1 win, thanks to goals from Nangle and Amos. However the Swifts protested that Vale's left-back Oag and inside-right Phillips for "professional irregularities". The protest was upheld and the Swifts won the replayed tie at Easter Road by another 4–1 scoreline.

For 1895–96, the Scottish Football Association introduced the Scottish Qualifying Cup, which acted both as a tournament in its own right and as an eliminator for the Scottish Cup. By reaching the fifth round of the Qualifying Cup (losing to Arbroath F.C.), the Vale was entitled to enter the Scottish Cup proper, and was drawn at home to Clyde in the first round, but lost 3–0.

=== Decline ===
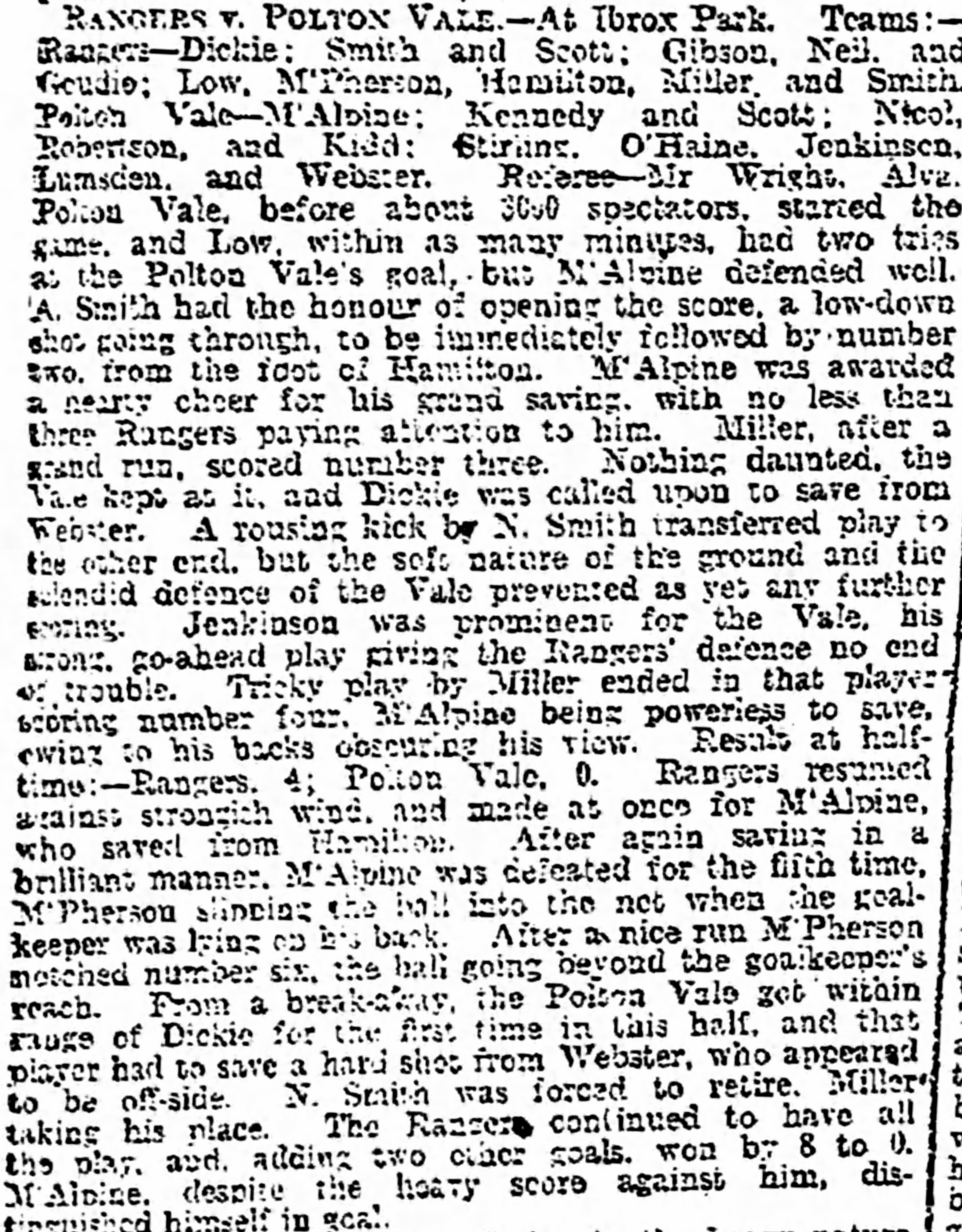
Rangers 8–0 Polton Vale, Scottish Cup First Round, 1897–98; from the Glasgow Herald, 10 January 1898

The Vale would never have a similar run of success again. A sign of desperation was when appealing its defeat by Dunfermline Athletic in the Qualifying Cup in 1895–96, on the basis that one Walls was playing under the name Campbell; "the papers submitted to the Association went to show that the man's name was really Walls, that he was baptised Walls, and that he was married under the name Walls". The Vale did reach the King Cup final in 1896–97, drawing with the St Bernard's "A" team 2–2, albeit the game finished with the Vale fans chanting "kill the referee", requiring the official (a Mr Banks of Bathgate) to receive a police escort. The club was consequently thrown out of the East of Scotland FA and therefore forced to default the replay, but the club was re-admitted before the 1897–98 season.

The club won through the Qualifying Cup for the second and last time in 1897–98, and the club received a plum tie when drawn at home to Rangers in the Scottish Cup. The Vale sold home advantage, and lost 8–0 at Ibrox Park.

However the financial benefit from the tie was short-lived. 1899 saw the club's final King Cup matches and 1900 the club's final Scottish Qualifying Cup entry, the club scratching to West Calder; despite an attempt to rescind the withdrawal, the Scottish FA ruled that the club had ceded the tie to West Calder.

The club's final competitive match was in 1901, a 4–2 defeat at Bathgate in the East of Scotland Consolation Cup. The very last match reported match was a 13–1 defeat at West Calder.

The club did enter the East of Scotland Shield's Qualifying Cup competition in 1901–02, but scratched when drawn to play Vale of Leithen. The club does not seem to have played during the season and the end came when it was struck off the Scottish FA member roll in April 1902.

== Colours ==
The club's colours were originally all navy. In 1894, the club changed its shirt colour to blue and black, and in 1896–97 the club wore blue shirts with a white sash, and white shorts. In 1897 the club changed to the blue and white vertical stripes that remained its kit until the end.

== Ground ==
The club's ground was Loanhead Park, although reports almost always refer to the ground simply as Loanhead.

== Notable players ==
- Peter Robertson, future Scottish international, played for the club in the early 1890s
