= Broxburn F.C. (1883) =

Former association football club in Scotland

Broxburn
- Full name: Broxburn Football Club
- Nickname: the Oilmen
- Founded: 1883
- Dissolved: 1894
- Ground: Albion Park
- Hon. Secretary: James Wilson
Home colours

Broxburn F.C. was an association football club from Broxburn in West Lothian.

== History ==
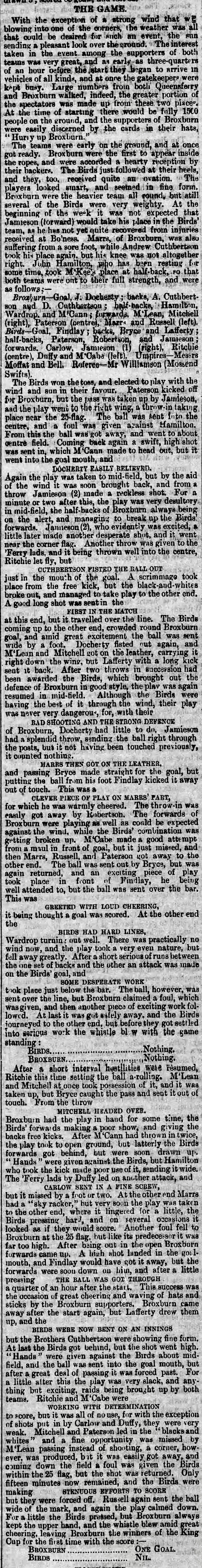
1888–89 King Cup Final; Broxburn 1–0 Bellstane Birds. West Lothian Courier and General Advertiser etc. Sat Mar 23 1889

The club was founded in 1883 as Broxburn Thistle, its founder members including Thomas Paterson, who had been involved with the junior club Broxburn Star, and who was still playing for the club in 1893.

Its first competitive football was in the Edinburgh Shield that season The first serious impact the club had on the local stage was reaching the final of the Consolation Cup in 1886–87, against Bo'ness, which went to three matches before Bo'ness won, albeit the second match was abandoned after Thistle fans swept onto the pitch in protest at the refereeing and refused to leave.

In 1886, the club joined the Scottish Football Association, and entered the Scottish Cup for the first time that season. The club beat the Bellstane Birds in the first round, and nearly upset Heart of Midlothian in the second, only losing 2–1.

Before the 1888–89 season, the club changed its name simply to Broxburn. That season, the club had its joint best run in the Scottish Cup, albeit thanks in part to a bye in the first round. In the second round Broxburn won 9–3 at Adventurers - coming from 3–1 down at half-time, and being aided greatly by the Adventurers goalkeeper unable to play the second half because of an injury - and gave Hearts an almighty shock in the third, taking a 2–0 lead in the first ten minutes thanks to a chip from Marr and a tap-in from Russell, before the Edinburgh side brought it back to 2–2 with ten minutes to go. 400 Broxburn supporters went on a special train to Edinburgh for the replay; Broxburn held out for 65 minutes before Hearts scored twice to go through.

The same season saw the club's greatest triumph, winning the King Cup, for clubs in the east of Scotland, for the only time, beating Bellstane Birds in the final at Champfleurie. With no convenient telegraph office in the village, those unable to go to the match were kept updated by pigeon; 1,000 Broxburn locals greeted the team at the station on its return with the trophy, and an estimated 3–4,000 were waiting at the Strathbock Hotel for a celebratory dinner.

In 1889–90, the club won the Linlithgowshire Cup for the first time, beating the same opponents in the final, this time far more comfortably, with a 7–0 scoreline, goals including a 30-yard screamer from Marr and McCann scoring one in-off the bar; however the Linlithgowshire had dropped by now to six clubs and Broxburn only played a semi-final before the final.

The 1890–91 Scottish Cup saw the Oilmen reach the third round again; once more the club benefitted from not having to play the first round, opponents West Calder scratching. In the third, Broxburn lost 6–0 at Bathgate Rovers, Broxburn having its best players to professional clubs and resorting to playing recruits from junior side Cardross Swifts. From the following season, the Scottish FA introduced qualifying rounds, and Broxburn never appeared in the first round proper again.

Broxburn won the county competition a second time in 1892–93. In the first round, the club beat local rivals Broxburn Shamrock; the original tie at Shamrock Park ended 1–1, the Shamrock goal trickling over the line after defender Findlay jumped over a weak header from O'Connell to let goalkeeper Sneddon collect it, only Sneddon had not anticipated the manoeuvre. Broxburn won a tight replay 4–3.

In the final, the club met the holders, Bathgate Rovers, with the match due to be hosted by the Shamrock, apparently for financial reasons; after the Rovers refused to play there, with Mr Brown of the Rovers saying "a rottener place to go and play football has not been found", the Cup was originally awarded to Broxburn. On reflection, the Linlithgowshire FA agreed to have the final at Uphall. In the match, Bathgate looked as if it would retain the trophy, going into a 2–0 lead. However, Broxburn equalized, one of the goals being "strongly appealed against" on the grounds of offside, and then seemingly took the lead from a header; referee James Archer gave the goal after consulting with a linesman, while the Rovers complained that the ball had gone "10 inches" over the bar (for which there was some support from Mr Brodie of Bo'ness, at the match in his role as a Linlithgowshire FA committee member). "After some fruitless minutes had been spent in altercation" on the pitch, the Rovers walked off, and Broxburn waited with Mr Archer until the expiration of time.

Two weeks before the County final, the club had played Bo'ness in the King Cup final at Linlithgow, and to some surprise lost 2–1, Walker's late equalizer followed by an even later winner. The game was notable for being the first use of a ball coated in India-rubber rather than bare leather.

The formation of the Scottish League, and various attempts at competitor competitions, had had a deleterious effect on the more local clubs. Broxburn's attempt at a joining a league, in 1891–92, proved disastrous - the Eastern Football Alliance not even surviving one season. In 1893 the county had 8 senior clubs; by 1895 this had halved. Broxburn was not among them. After a strong 1892–93 season, the club lost Sibbalds to St Bernards and Fleming to East Stirlingshire, and it lost 7–1 to Mossend Swifts in the first round of the Edinburgh Shield, as well as suffering first round exits in the Linlithgowshire and King Cups.

By the start of 1894, the club only had "two or three of the old players" left, the majority having moved to England as professionals or "new pastures "Eastwards", for a friendly with Bathgate on 6 January 1894. The 2–1 defeat was the club's last match, as the club was taken over by Broxburn Shamrock shortly afterwards, on the basis the village was too small to compete with split loyalties, although, contrary to expectations, the Shamrock was not able to take over Albion Park, the ground was handed over to the junior side Broxburn Athletic.

== Colours ==
The club's colours were originally black and white hoops with blue knickers. In 1891 the club changed to light blue shirts with black knickers. The club's final season was played in red and white vertical stripes with white knickers.

== Ground ==
The club originally played at Sports Park. The highest recorded attendance there was 2,000 for the 1888 Cup tie with Heart of Midlothian, which included 800 supporting the visitors. The profit from the tie was £10, higher than the sum Hearts offered to switch the tie to Edinburgh.

In 1889, the club moved to a new, purpose-built ground, Albion Park, which the club opened with a friendly against Mossend Swifts, the visitors spoiling the party by winning "a beautiful game" 5–1.

== Honours ==
- King Cup:
  - Winners: 1888–89
  - Runners-up: 1892–93
- Linlithgowshire Cup/Rosebery Cup:
  - Winners: 1889–90, 1892–93
- East of Scotland Consolation Cup:
  - Runners-up: 1886–87
