= Bathgate Rovers F.C. =

Former association football club in Scotland

Bathgate Rovers
- Full name: Bathgate Rovers Football Club
- Founded: 1883
- Dissolved: 1893
- Ground: Boghead Park
- Secretary: Thomas Narton
Durhamtown Rangers colours	Bathgate Rovers colours

Bathgate Rovers Football Club was a football club from Bathgate in West Lothian, which was active between 1883 and 1893. The club was one of the more successful in the county for a decade, winning both the King Cup and the Linlithgowshire Cup in the same year, before folding into a new Bathgate club.

== History ==
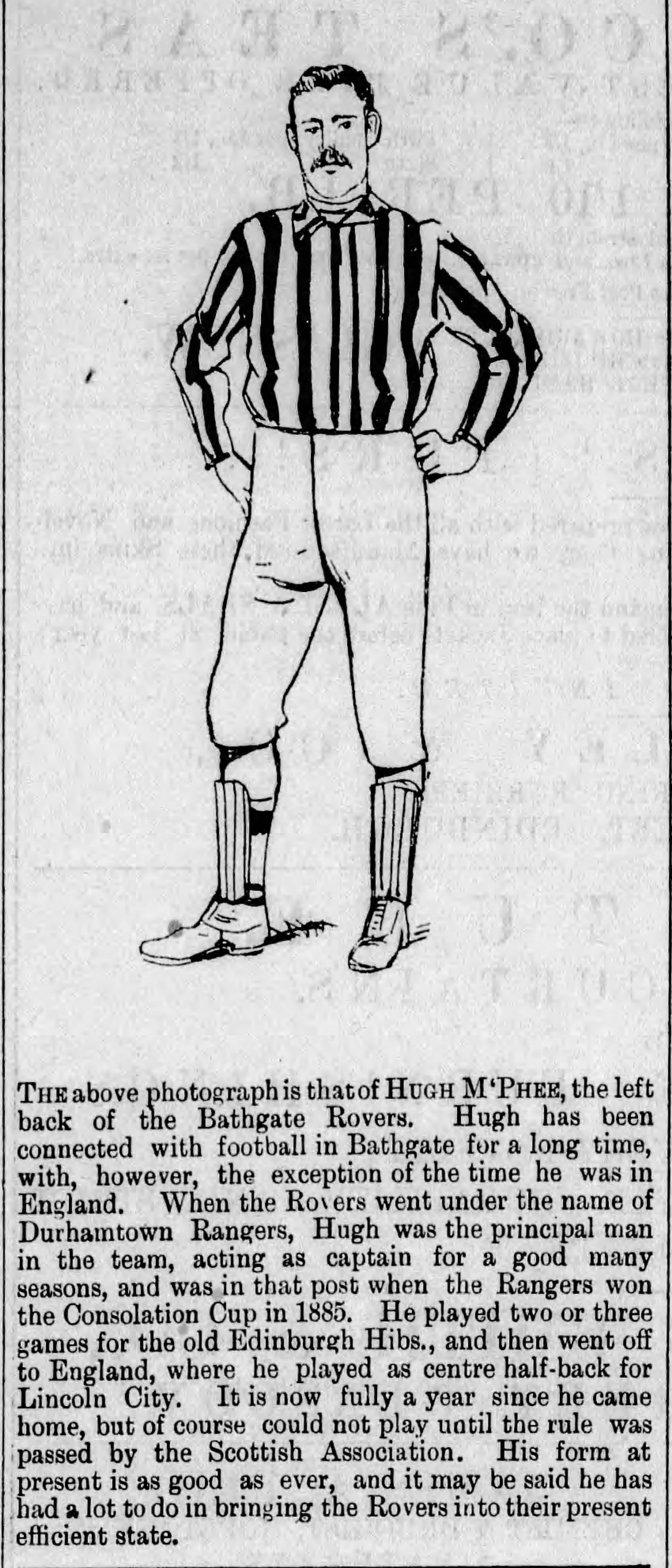
Hugh McPhee, former captain of Durhamtown Rangers and player for Hibernian and Lincoln City, Lothian Courier, 31 October 1891

=== Durhamtown Rangers ===
The club was formed in 1883 under the name Durhamtown Rangers by Irish workers in Bathgate, and by the end of the season its matches were being reported. In 1884–85, the club entered the first Linlithgowshire Cup (also known as the Rosebery Cup), and was knocked out of the semi-final by Mossend Swifts. Durhamtown protested on the basis that Mossend was not actually in Linlithgowshire, and, although it was proved that Mossend was indeed outside the county boundary, the Swifts were allowed to continue in the tournament. Durhamtown did at least win the Consolation Cup for those knocked out before the final, beating Loanhead Sarsfield 5–0 at Powderhall Stadium, William "Brassey" Murnin scoring a hat-trick and Tobin two more.

The club reached the final of the Linlithgowshire Cup for the first time in 1886–87, against Armadale, at Broxburn. The pitch was covered in snow, and the clubs agreed to play the match as a friendly instead. Unfortunately, nobody had told the crowd, and when the teams changed ends after 30 minutes, it dawned on the spectators that the match was not for the trophy, and they stopped the match, demanding refunds. The replay at Bo'ness attracted 600 spectators, 400 neutrals and the majority of the remainder backing the Dale, and a "most brutal" game ended 2–2, despite Durhamtown being handicapped by losing Murnin (by now captain) to a broken leg five minutes into the game. Armadale finally won in the second replay at Champfleurie 2–0.

The same season saw the club make its Scottish Cup debut, being drawn away at Hibernian. The Rangers took a shock lead after a quarter-of-an-hour, but three goals for the Hibs in the first twenty minutes in the second half turned the tie around, and the final score was 5–1; indeed Hibernian would go on to win the trophy.

=== Erin Rovers ===
During the summer, the club changed its name to Erin Rovers, as part of a takeover of the Bathgate Volunteers club. The club again drew Hibs in the Scottish Cup, this time in the second round, having beaten Bellstane Birds at home 5–0 in the first, the visiting team subject to the habitual abuse from Bathgate supporters. Hibernian asked the Rovers to scratch, but the club refused to do so. The game therefore played out at Bogside, the visitors winning 6–0.

The club entered the King Cup, for East of Scotland teams, for the first time in 1887–88, losing 1–0 at home to Armadale in the first round, even though the Dale was down to 10 men for 75 minutes after Johnstone was knocked flat by the ball. The club had more success in the more local Linlithgowshire tournament, finally breaking the Armadale bogey with a 2–1 win in the semi-final, the players' speed and accuracy in passing "far out-distanc[ing]" those of the Dale.

Not long after the start of the 1887–88 season, the Erin Rovers were said to be "beginning to reform", after which "they will play in white", suggesting that the club was widening its appeal beyond the Irish diaspora; there had been occasional references in 1887 to the club under the name Bathgate Rovers. The club had changed its colours to white in time for the Linlithgowshire Cup final with Bo'ness at Champfleurie Park, but a strong wind meant that Bo'ness winning the toss and choosing to kick with the wind was crucial for the match. Bo'ness scored four in the first half, and a tired Rovers only managed three in the second.

In the 1888–89 the season was often referred to as Bathgate Erin Rovers, as well as Bathgate Rovers, In the Scottish Cup, the club gained its record competition victory to date, beating Leith Harp 6–0, scoring the first inside 30 seconds, and John Kelly scoring a hat-trick. In the second round, the club drew the other major side in Edinburgh, Heart of Midlothian, in the second round, losing 4–0, albeit two goals came in the last ten minutes.

The club did however have its best run in the Edinburgh Shield, reaching the semi-final, and only going out to Leith Athletic in a second replay, although there was controversy as the Rovers earlier claimed the tie because of the non-appearance of the Athletic on a previously scheduled date; by 12 votes to 6, the East of Scotland committee decided that the Athletic had been wired by the referee that the pitch was unplayable.

=== Bathgate Rovers ===
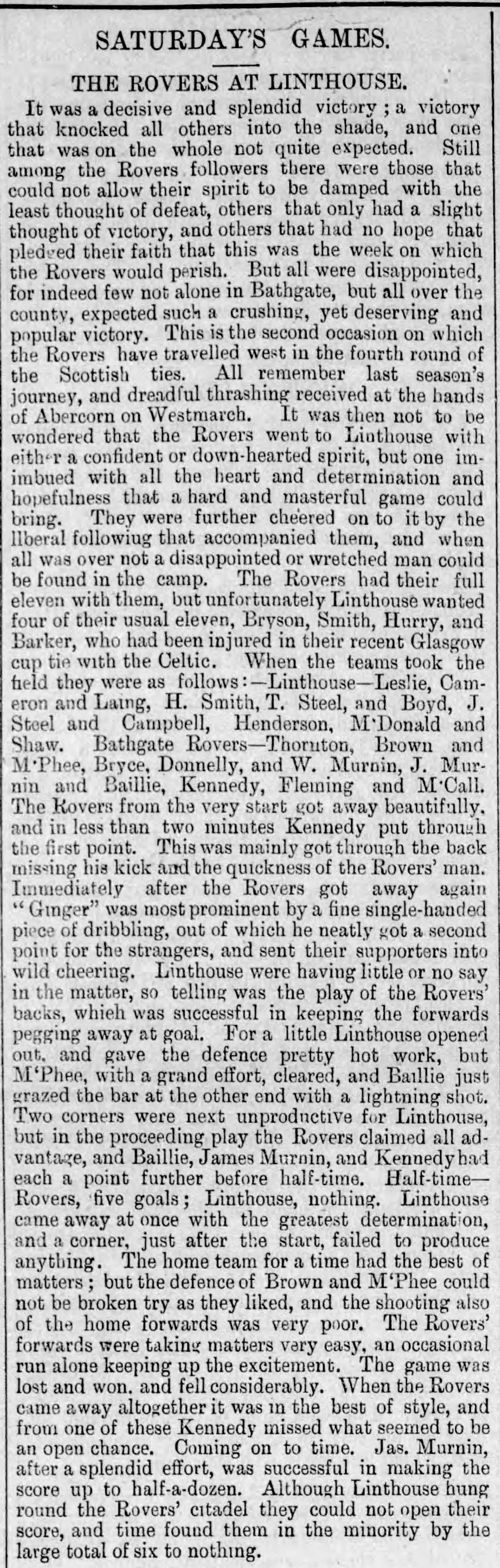
Linthouse 0–6 Bathgate Rovers, 1891–92 Scottish Cup first round, Lothian Courier, 5 December 1891

From 1889 to 1890 the club was formally called Bathgate Rovers. The club got off to a poor start under its new name, being held to a 3–3 draw at home by the unheralded Champfleurie in the 1889–90 Scottish Cup, albeit in front of a crowd of "no more than two dozen", and for some unknown reason scratched from the competition before the scheduled replay. The club had also lost some key players (temporarily, as it turned out), including the "grand old man" Brown to Armadale, and "Brassey" Murnin, who had been the regular goalkeeper after recovering from his leg-break, who emigrated to the United States.

The 1890–91 season was better for the club, even though the Armadale jinx struck again, as the Dale knocked the Rovers out of both the Linlithgowshire and East of Scotland competitions at the semi-final stage. The club did go the furthest it had in the Scottish Cup; it survived a protest from Dunfermline Athletic after a 3–2 win in the first round with regard to the "beastly" pitch, and matched its 6–0 record Cup win against a Broxburn side shorn of its best players and resorting to playing recruits from junior side Cardross Swifts. However, in the fourth round it was hammered 8–0 by Abercorn.

The club was in financial difficulty after the 1890–91 season, with the balance sheet showing "a considerable balance to the wrong side". Indeed, the club turned up with only 8 players against Penicuik Athletic in the semi-final of the East of Scotland Consolation Cup that season, but only lost 2–1.

=== 1891–92: double and split ===
The club's greatest successes came in 1891–92. The Scottish Cup had introduced qualifying rounds, and Rovers had won through to the first round proper with wins over Armadale, Falkirk, Slamannan, and Clydebank. In the first round proper, Rovers was drawn at the eventual Scottish Football Alliance champions Linthouse, and won by the startling score of 6–0. The club was met at Bathgate Station by cheering supporters, who had received news of the game via telegram; the only disappointment was the small crowd, which meant the club's gate share was 2s 2d.

Although the club lost by the same score in the second round, it was against Queen's Park at Hampden Park, and the club had kept the score down to 1–0 at half-time and the second only came after 70 minutes. It was also a prestigious fixture which the club was delighted to have. It had ample compensation by completing the local double of winning both King and County - the King Cup and Linlithgowshire Cup - and had its best result in the East of Scotland Shield, reaching the semi-final. The Rosebery Cup for winning the Linlithgowshire championship was awarded after a 4–0 win over the revived Broxburn Shamrock with goals from Fleming, a scrimmage, James "Ginger" Murnin (captain William's brother), and McColl;

However, at the moment of its greatest triumph, and apparently due to "sectarianism", at the end of the 1891–92 season there was a split within the club. A new side - Bathgate Athletic F.C. - was formed, with a ground at the head of the High Street, and wearing "smart" blue and white jerseys, albeit its application to join the East of Scotland Association was originally turned down on the basis that "nothing was known about them". Nevertheless, the split had affected Rovers; in the Scottish Cup, the club lost 4–1 at Levendale in the second round, with Bryce sent off for over-protesting about the Levendale third goal and the club only picking up 7½d in gate money, and lost heavily to Broxburn in the King and East of Scotland competitions.

=== 1892–93 Linlithgowshire Cup final ===
The club however did reach the final of the Linlithgowshire Cup, albeit only needing to play two matches to get there. The club met Broxburn once more, in a match scheduled to be hosted by Broxburn Shamrock, apparently for financial reasons; after the Rovers refused to play, with Mr Brown of the Rovers saying "a rottener place to go and play football has not been found", the Cup was originally awarded to Broxburn. On reflection, the Linlithgowshire FA agreed to have the final at Uphall. In the match, Bathgate looked as if it would retain the trophy, going into a 2–0 lead. However, Broxburn equalized, one of the goals being "strongly appealed against" on the grounds of offside, and then seemingly took the lead from a header; referee James Archer gave the goal after consulting with a linesman, while the Rovers complained that the ball had gone "10 inches" over the bar (for which there was some support from Mr Brodie of Boness, at the match in his role as a Linlithgowshire FA committee member). "After some fruitless minutes had been spent in altercation" on the pitch, the Rovers walked off, never to return to the match, or the competition.

The local FA had a meeting after the match, to vote on the Rovers' protests; the meeting was deadlocked at 4–4 apiece on the Rovers protests, and Mr Archer - who as well as being referee was President of the local FA - refused to use his casting vote, while Mr Young of Broxburn threatened to withdraw his club from the association as a result. At a follow-up meeting, Mr Archer resigned as president, on the basis that the vote had in effect been one of no confidence, which left Mr Young as president pro tem. The Rovers' protest now suggested the ball had been 18 inches over the bar, and was dismissed on the basis that the Rovers should have continued the match, albeit under protest.

The club finished the season with further disappointment, losing 4–2 against Polton Vale at St Bernards' New Logie Green ground in the final of the East of Scotland Consolation Cup.

=== End of club and re-emergence as Bathgate F.C. ===
The Athletic split resulted in two sides that were heading towards insolvency, and the Rovers allowed its lease over Boghead Park to expire at the end of the 1892–93 season. Consequently, a meeting was held at the Bathgate Institute, with a view to forming a new club for the town, and it was agreed to set up a fresh club, Bathgate F.C., which would endeavour (successfully) to re-gain use of Boghead, and which was made up of Rovers and Athletic players.

== Colours ==
The club played in the following colours:

- Durhamtown Rangers (1883–87): royal blue and green shirt, navy shorts
- Erin Rovers (1887–88): green shirt, navy shorts
- Erin/Bathgate Rovers (1888–93): white shirt, navy shorts

== Ground ==
The club played at Boghead Park, known as the "loch" because of its tendency to flood, and which hosted the 1888–89 Linlithgowshire Cup final between Armadale and Bo'ness.

== Honours ==
- King Cup
  - Winners: 1891–92
- Linlithgowshire Cup
  - Winners: 1891–92
  - Runners-up: 1886–87, 1887–88, 1892–93
- Linlithgowshire Consolation Cup
  - Winners: 1884–85
- East of Scotland Consolation Cup
  - Runners-up: 1892–93
