= Kingscavil =

Coordinates: 55.972°N 3.548°W

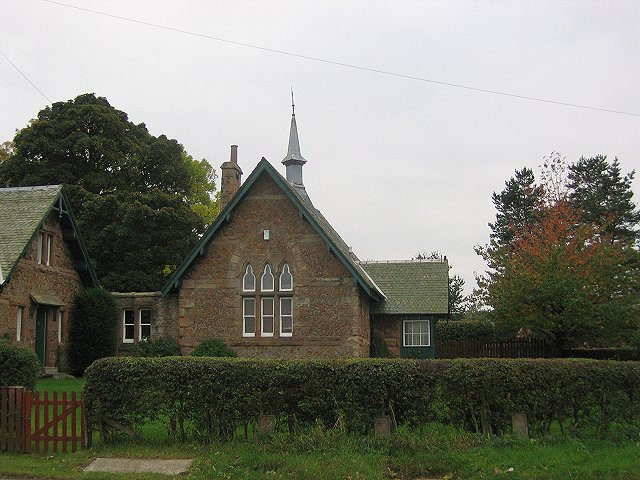
- The old school

- Location within West Lothian
- OS grid reference: NT033765
- Civil parish: Linlithgow
- Council area: West Lothian
- Lieutenancy area: West Lothian
- Country: Scotland
- Sovereign state: United Kingdom
- Post town: LINLITHGOW
- Postcode district: EH49
- Dialling code: 01506
- Police: Scotland
- Fire: Scottish
- Ambulance: Scottish
- UK Parliament: Bathgate and Linlithgow
- Scottish Parliament: Linlithgow

Kingscavil (NT029765) is a small settlement in West Lothian lying between Linlithgow and Bridgend on the old A9 (now the B9080).

== History ==
Kingscavil had historically been under the direct control of the Scottish Crown. During King Robert the Bruce's resettlement plans, Kingscavil was granted to Sir James Douglas which was witnessed by Edward Bruce as part of "omnes terras de Kincauill" as well as the village of East Calder.

Kingscavil had a quarry located in it. Sandstone quarried from Kingscavil was used to construct Linlithgow Palace. Kingscavil later became a hub for shale oil extraction, with the village being built up with workers going to live there. Kingscavil Church was also constructed in 1902 by the Church of Scotland in English Gothic style to serve the village. However, following a collapse in the shale oil industry in the 1930s, the majority of the new village was demolished. This came after an inquiry into conditions in the village was set up by the Department of Health, the first to have been held under the Housing (Scotland) Act 1930. The inquiry was commissioned following West Lothian County Council receiving reports from their inspectors about the sanitary conditions in the new housing. The inquiry found in 1937 that the housing was inadequate and should be demolished with the residents being re-homed in nearby Bridgend.

== Sport ==
A football club from the village, Champfleurie F.C., played in the Scottish Cup in the 1880s, hosting Heart of Midlothian at Champfleurie Park in the second round in 1889–90.
