= Burntisland Thistle F.C. =

Former association football club in Scotland

Burntisland Thistle
- Full name: Burntisland Thistle Football Club
- Nicknames: the Thistle, the Black & Whites
- Founded: 1876
- Dissolved: 1892
- Ground: Lammerlaws Park
- Secretary: John S. Richardson
Home colours

Burntisland Thistle Football Club was an association football club from Burntisland in Fife, Scotland.

== History ==
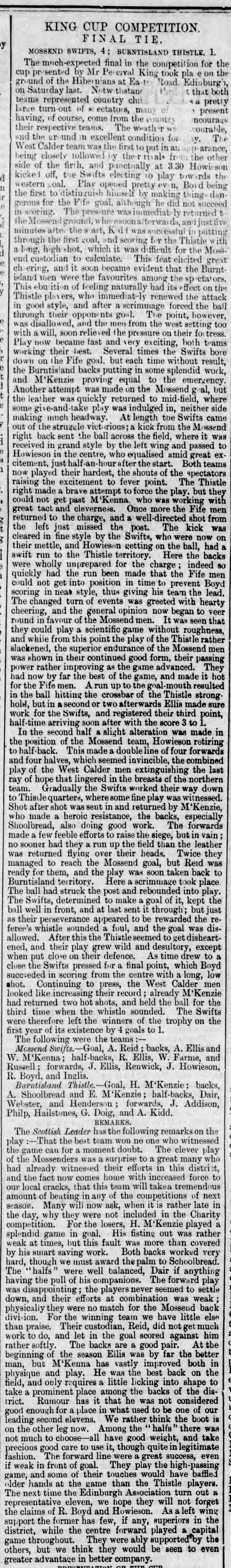
1886–87 King Cup Final, Mossend Swifts 4–1 Burntisland Thistle, Lothian Courier 12 March 1887

The club was formed in 1876, being one of the first five clubs in Fifeshire, as an activity for members of the Burntisland Thistle Cricket Club. The Thistle's first competitive match came in the Edinburgh Cup in 1879–80, losing 2–1 at home to Hanover in the first round. Thistle managed its first competitive win in the same competition in 1880–81, beating Addiewell 7–1 away from home, but its reward was a second round tie with Hibernian and the Thistle was hammered 15–0.

Thistle did not enter the newly named Edinburgh Shield in 1882–83; in 1881–82, it lost 9–0 at Dunfermline in 1881–82, but for 1882–83 as there were now enough clubs in Fifeshire for a competition between themselves, rather than face humiliation in a competition dominated by the well-established Edinburgh clubs. Accordingly, in April 1882, the Fifeshire Football Association was established, and the first Fife Cup took place in 1882–83. Thistle was a founder member and played in the initial competition, losing to Cowdenbeath in the semi-final.

The club did return to play in the Edinburgh Shield, albeit without significant success. The club's best performance was reaching the semi-final of the Consolation Cup (for clubs eliminated before the final) in 1886–87, being beaten 5–3 by Bo'ness, the Thistle handicapped by being without its two best players (Hailstanes and David Dair, the latter replaced by brother Willie).

=== 1886–87: double runner-up ===
Thistle never won the Fife Cup; it was twice runner-up. In 1886–87, the club met Dunfermline Athletic in the final, at Lady's Mill. After 55 minutes, with the score 1–0 to Athletic, a fight broke out between the players, on the basis that the Athletic's Knight claimed to have been struck by Thistle's goalkeeper Mackenzie who was trying to clear the ball. The fight spread to the crowd, and lasted half-an-hour before the fighters were separated. Referee M'Kay of Northern awarded the match to Athletic on the basis of rough play by the Burntisland goalkeeper, After a protest, the final was re-played, and at the third time of asking Athletic won 3–1 at Cowdenbeath.

The club was also runner-up in the first Percival King Cup, for East of Scotland clubs outside Edinburgh, winning the semi-final against Champfleurie when the Thistle charged the Celestials' goalkeeper Sneddon over the goal-line while he was still holding the ball. The Thistle lost 4–1 to Mossend Swifts in the final at Easter Road.

1886–87 was the club's first as a member of the Scottish Football Association, and thus the first season in which it entered the Scottish Cup; Dunfermline scratched from the clubs' first round tie and the Black and Whites lost to Cowdenbeath in the second.

=== 1887–88: second Fife Cup final ===
The club reached the Fife Cup final again in 1887–88, losing 6–1 in a replay against Lassodie at Lady's Mill in Dunfermline in the final. In the 1887–88 Scottish Cup, the club seemed to have gained revenge over Dunfermline Athletic, after a 4–2 win, but the club was disqualified because of the non-registration of H. M'Leod. The one consolation the club had in the season was its second XI winning the Fifeshire Second XI Cup - albeit by default as Alloa Athletic's reserves did not turn up for the final.

=== Final years ===
The club let its Scottish FA subscription lapse for 1888–89, only taking part in local competitions. Its only win in the national competition came in the 1890–91 Scottish Cup, 4–2 over Bonnyrigg Rose Athletic in the first round. The Thistle scratched to Heart of Midlothian in the second.

The Scottish FA introduced qualifying rounds for the Cup from 1891 to 1892; in the first qualifying round, at home to Linlithgow Athletic the club looked in a positive position with a 4–1 half-time lead, but lost a man to injury for the second, and was beaten 6–4. The club left the Scottish FA for the second and final time at the end of the season but it had already quit the senior game for the Scottish Junior Football Association, playing in the Scottish Junior Cup for the first time, and losing 8–1 at East Benhar Heatherbell in the second round. The club does not seem to have continued afterwards.

== Colours ==
The club played in black and white jersey and hose, with blue serge knickers.

== Ground ==
The Thistle's ground was Lammerlaws Park, a 10-minute walk from the station.

== Notable players ==
- Bob Bonthron, a Thistle player in the 19th century who played for Manchester United and Birmingham in the 20th
