= Bob Boyd (footballer) =

Scottish footballer

Robert Boyd (born in Whifflet Old Monkland on 2 July 1867, died in West Calder Midlothian on 11 August 1930) was a Scottish footballer who worked as a shale miner and played for Mossend Swifts, Leith Athletic, Third Lanark and Scotland. Bob Boyd played in 2 international matches in 1889 and 1891. He was the first player from the East of Scotland League to play for the Scotland national team.
