= Addiewell F.C. =

Association football club in Scotland

Addiewell
- Full name: Addiewell Football Club
- Founded: 1880
- Dissolved: 1885
- Ground: Cuthill Park
- Captain: James M'Nicol
- Hon. & Match Secretary: Kenneth Lamond
Home colours

Addiewell Football Club was a Scottish senior football club from the village of Addiewell, Midlothian.

== History ==
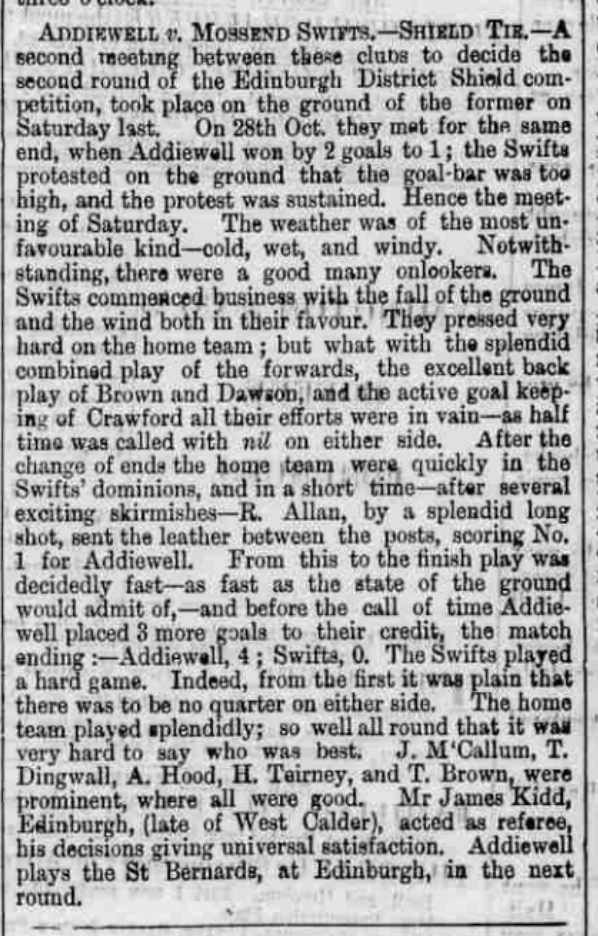
1882–83 Edinburgh Shield 2nd Round, Addiewell 4–0 Mossend Swifts, West Lothian Courier, 25 November 1882

The club was founded in 1880. Its first recorded match was an 8–0 defeat to the Shotts reserve XI, and its first competitive football came in the Edinburgh Shield that September, with a 7–1 defeat to Burntisland Thistle.

The club did improve over the season, and won 6 of 12 matches, but one of the defeats was by 8 goals to 1 at home to the closest club West Calder, which, although with fewer members, had more experience of the game. Addiewell nevertheless joined the Scottish Football Association, at the same time as West Calder, in time to enter the 1881–82 Scottish Cup.

Addiewell was unlucky with its first round draw, having to face Hibernian away. The clubs played their tie in advance of the other scheduled ties, probably to "lock in" the Hibernian players for the competition, and Hibs won 7–0. The club also lost in the first round of the Edinburgh Shield, to West Calder, 1–0; an Addiewell protest that it had wrongly been denied a goal was dismissed.

1882–83 was the club's final season of senior football. It walked over serial withdrawers Dunfermline in the first round of the Scottish Cup, and, before its second round tie with Heart of Midlothian, beat St Lennox Zebras in the Edinburgh Shield for its first competitive win. Unfortunately, the club had scheduled its conversazione - the term for an annual celebration - on the eve of the Hearts tie, resulting in a "poor muster of the first eleven"; only four regular first-team players - not including the captain - were in a fit state to play. The consequence is that Hearts ran up 14 goals without reply.

Addiewell at least reached the third round of the Edinburgh Shield, having to beat Mossend Swifts twice after a protest, but went down 8–0 to St Bernards in the third.

Addiewell left the Scottish FA before the 1883–84 season, but was active until 1885–86, albeit in October 1885 the club's conversazione "was not nearly so large as on earlier occasions" and indeed it does not seem to have played after the 1884–85 season.

== Colours ==
The club wore white jerseys and "pants", with red stockings.

== Ground ==
The club's ground was at Cuthill Park, 2 miles from the nearest railway station.
