= Linlithgow Athletic F.C. =

Former association football club in Scotland

Linlithgow Athletic
- Full name: Linlithgow Athletic Football Club
- Nickname(s): the Athletic
- Founded: 1888
- Dissolved: 1897
- Ground: Captain's Park
- Secretary: Alex. Bennie
Home colours

Linlithgow Athletic F.C. was an association football club from Linlithgow in West Lothian.

== History ==
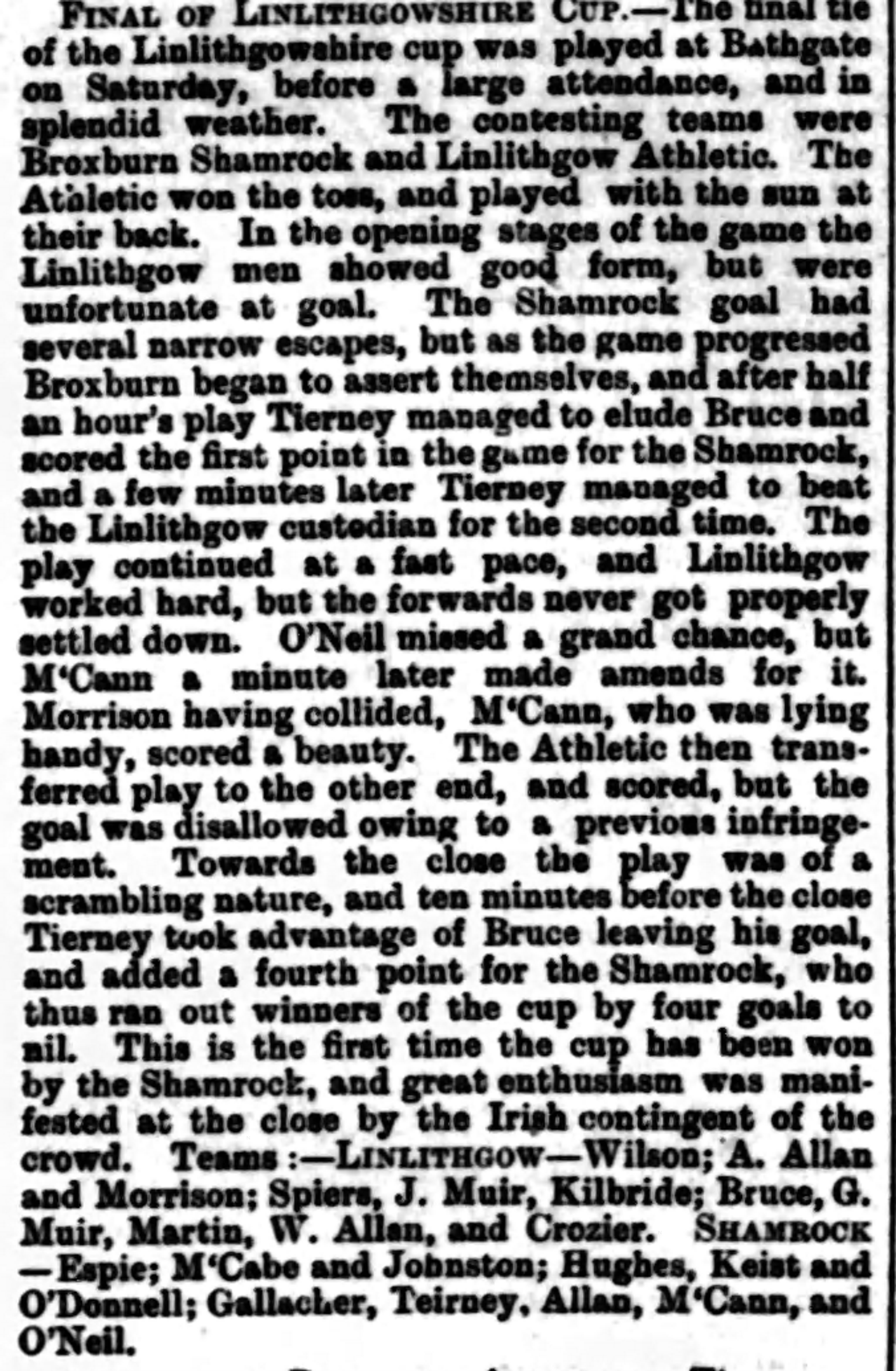
1893–94 Linlithgowshire Cup Final, Broxburn Shamrock 4–0 Linlithgow Athletic, Lothian Courier 28 April 1894

The club was formed at the start of 1888, the club's opening match being a 1–0 home win over Dean Rangers of Edinburgh.

It was generally one of the least successful senior clubs in the county, not helped by losing some of its leading players before its first full season. It only played in the main rounds of the Scottish Cup twice, and suffered heavy defeats on both occasions - 6–2 at home to the Adventurers of Edinburgh in 1888–89 and 10–1 at Cowdenbeath in 1890–91; the Cowdenbeath game suggesting a lack of fitness amongst the Athletic, as eight of the Cowden goals came in the final half-an-hour.

The Athletic was similarly unsuccessful in the Edinburgh Shield, the most notable of the local competitions which the club entered. It entered every year from 1888–89 until 1896–97, and only won twice - 9–1 against Pumpherston in 1891–92 and 5–1 at a scratch Bellstane Birds in 1894–95. The slightly less prestigious Percival King Cup also provided slim pickings for the Athletic, only once reaching the third round, in 1893–94.

The only competition in which the Athletic had any level of success was the Linlithgowshire Cup, which generally had entrants in the single digits. Even the Athletic's one appearance in the final, in 1893–94, was aided by considerable fortune. The club protested a first-round defeat to the original incarnation of Uphall because of the non-registration of one player, and won the replayed tie. Its next opponent - Armadale - was disqualified before the tie was played because it did not provide a list of players from its tie with Bo'ness. That was enough to put the Athletic in the final, against Broxburn Shamrock at Bathgate, and the Shamrock won 4–0.

Despite the efforts of the faithful club secretary Alexander Bennie, who stayed loyal to his post for the club's entire existence, and who had even scored in the club's first competitive match in 1888, the club threw in the towel soon after the start of the 1896–97 season. The last throw of the dice had been an attempt in 1895–96 to form a Linlithgowshire league - the club had not participated in any of the predecessor competitions such as the Eastern Alliance - but that collapsed after the Athletic had played just 3 matches, the last - the club's last match of all - being a 1–1 draw at Armadale.

In 1896–97, the club was forced to scratch in the first round of both the Scottish Cup and Edinburgh Shield (to Penicuik Athletic and Broxburn Shamrock respectively), and did not pay its subscription to the local association as being "not being able to raise a team", at least two of its "best men" having joined Bo'ness. The coup de grâce was being struck off the Scottish Football Association membership list before the start of the next season. A junior club, Linlithgow Athletic Rovers, played at Captain's Park during the season, perhaps as a Junior continuation; but this incarnation only lasted until October 1897, its last match being a 2–0 defeat to North-Western.

== Colours ==
The club's first colours were white shirts and blue knickers. In 1894 the shirts changed to red and black hoops.

== Ground ==
The club played at Captain's Park.

== Honours ==
- Linlithgowshire Cup
  - Runners-up: 1893–94

== Notable players ==
- George Allan, one-time record goalscorer for Liverpool F.C. and Scottish Championship winner with Celtic F.C.
