= Armadale F.C. (1880) =

Former association football club in Scotland

Armadale
- Full name: Armadale Football Club
- Nickname: the Miner Lads
- Founded: 1880
- Dissolved: 1894
- Ground: Mayfield
- Match Secretary: James Archer
1880–89 colours

Armadale Football Club was a football club based in Armadale, West Lothian in Scotland.

== History ==
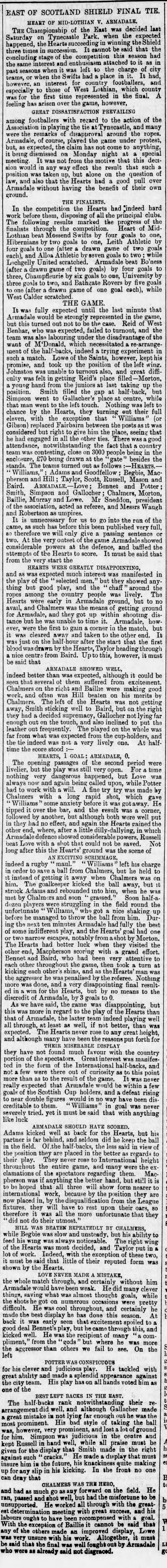
1890–91 East of Scotland Shield Final, Heart of Midlothian 3–0 Armadale, Lothian Courier, 21 March 1891

The club's foundation date was published as 1870, but this may have been a typographical error for 1880, as the club's first recorded matches date from the 1880–81 season. The club was a staunch Protestant side and within West Lothian became "such a favourite among Scotsmen".

The club's first achievement of note was in the Edinburgh Shield consolation tournament of 1883–84, for clubs eliminated from the main competition before the final. Armadale reached the semi-final, and beat Broxburn Shamrock 5–0. However the Shamrock protested that the Armadale captain had not handed to the referee a list of the players, and the Consolation Cup committee disqualified Armadale.

Armadale was the strongest club in Linlithgowshire for much of its history. It reached the final of the first Linlithgowshire Cup - also known as Lord Rosebery's Cup - in 1884–85. In the final, Armadale played Mossend Swifts, who faced a protest from its beaten semi-final opponents, Durhamtown Rangers, on the basis that the village of Mossend was not actually in Linlithgowshire. The Swifts were allowed to play the final, which his Lordship considered "quite satisfactory", and beat Armadale 3–2 at Bo'ness in the final. For the 1885–86 tournament, the Linlithgowshire Association simply "forgot" to invite the Swifts to defend the trophy, which had not had the Swifts' name inscribed thereon.

=== 1885–1889: first Scottish Cup entries and two Linlithgowshire Cup wins ===
The club more than made up for this by winning the trophy for the next two seasons. It gained an ample revenge over Broxburn Shamrock in the final in 1885–86, winning with a goal in the last 90 seconds. The club also won the one-off Linlithgowshire Charity Cup in 1885–86, with a 9–0 win over the Bathgate Volunteers in the final at Durhamtown's ground.

In the 1886–87 Linlithgowshire final, Armadale met Durhamtown Rovers, at Broxburn. The pitch was covered in snow, and the clubs agreed to play the match as a friendly instead. Unfortunately, nobody had told the crowd, and when the teams changed ends after 30 minutes, it dawned on the spectators that the match was not for the trophy, and they stopped the match, demanding refunds. The replay at Bo'ness attracted 600 spectators, 400 neutrals and the majority of the remainder backing Armadale, and a "most brutal" game ended 2–2, despite Durhamtown being handicapped by losing captain Murnin to a broken leg five minutes into the game. Armadale finally won in the second replay at Champfleurie 2–0.

The club made its first entry to the Scottish Cup in 1886–87 and for the only time in the club's history it won two ties in the same season. The second round was an endurance visit Newcastleton, Armadale ending the day in the third round, but 7/6 out of pocket, as the gate only amounted to 14/2, suggesting a paying audience of 12. In the third round, the club lost 5–2 at St Bernards.

In the 1888–89 Scottish Cup the club finally got its first home draw in the Scottish Cup, at the fifth time of asking, and took advantage by gaining its record win, with a 12–0 hammering of Champfleurie, whose organization failings saw it only able to enter a scratch side. After a bye in the second round, Armadale was drawn away again, and again lost 5–2, this time at Mossend Swifts; the Swifts took a 2-goal lead inside the first five minutes, which Armadale pegged back to 2–2 by half-time, but the Swifts' superior passing game told the difference towards the end of the game.

=== 1889–90: final flourish ===
The club had to wait until 1890–91 to win the county cup again, but in 1889–90 won the King Cup for the only time, beating Bellstane Birds 5–2 in the final.

The club's greater achievement however was winning through five rounds to reach the final of the East of Scotland Shield, in which the club played Heart of Midlothian. Armadale was desperately unlucky with the venue; the competition regulations demanded the final be played at a neutral venue, but Hearts' Tynecastle Park was for some reason allowed in the ballot for final venue, and it duly came out of the hat, so Armadale had to play the final at its opponent's ground. Armadale protested, but the Edinburgh FA unsurprisingly backed the bigger club. A poor Hearts were nevertheless good enough to beat Armadale 3–0.

The same season the club was drawn at home to Hibernian in the Scottish Cup; the tie was played at the new ground on Volunteer Park, and Armadale drew its biggest-ever crowd. By the 35th minute the Hibees were 3–0 up; Armadale brought it back to 3–2 with 15 minutes remaining, but could not find an equalizer.

=== Decline ===
The 1890–91 Scottish Cup was the last in which every entrant started in the first round proper; the club was drawn away - yet again - to Leith Athletic, and lost 3–2, amid controversy; Armadale had a goal disallowed for unknown reasons, and Leith's winner came from a shot across the goal which the crowd claimed had gone in (apparently a regular tactic at Bank Park). After some deliberation, Leith claimed the goal, which the referee awarded, resulting in Armadale coming close to walking off the pitch. Referee M'Culloch was considered "not fit to referee a game" and that "the sooner he is struck off the efficient list the better". Armadale duly protested, but, in another instance of protecting the bigger clubs, the Scottish FA ruled the protest out of time, as not being received by the 6 p.m. Thursday protest deadline, even though the postmark confirmed a Tuesday posting.

The introduction of qualifying rounds for the Cup 1891–92, and the arrival of league football, was devastating for the clubs in the smaller Linlithgowshire towns. Armadale did not play in the Scottish Cup proper again and the Linlithgowshire Cup reduced to 6 entrants for 1890–91, one of whom did not turn up for its first tie. In the final, Armadale beat Bo'ness 2–0 at Boghead, with a goal from Baillie in the first half and Chalmers in the second; Bo'ness' protest that right-winger Lowe had not been registered before the deadline was swiftly dismissed. Armadale did play in the Eastern Alliance in its one season in 1891–92, but struggled, being bottom-but-one in the unfinished competition after 3 wins in 12 matches.

The club's decline was swift and in part down to administrative incompetence, as the long-serving secretary Archer had left in 1893. The club appears not to have renewed its Scottish FA subscription for the 1893–94 season, being struck off the roll, but instantly replaced by a Phoenix club, which disclaimed the debts of the previous.

This "new" Armadale was disqualified from the Linlithgowshire Cup in 1893–94 because the new secretary repeated the error of an earlier generation, and forgot the elemental task of sending a list of players, this time though after a successful tie. Armadale was also invited to join the new East of Scotland League in January 1894, but did not respond to the invitation, which had gone to the Honorary Secretary rather than the Match Secretary; the Hon. Sec. did not pass the invitation on. The club was considered defunct before the 1894–95 season - indeed the Linlithgow Association started the following season with but 2 members, the blame put on professionalism killing the county game - and the only references afterwards to Armadale appear to relate to the Armadale Volunteers F.C.

== Colours ==
The club wore the following colours:

- 1880–89: navy jerseys and stockings, with white knickers
- 1889–91: blue and white striped jerseys, white knickers
- 1891–93: light blue jerseys, white knickers
- 1894: dark and light blue shirts, white knickers

== Ground ==
The club's ground was originally Mayfield, a mile from the station. From 1890 the club played at Volunteer Park, its first game there being the Scottish Cup tie with Hibernian.

== Honours ==
- King Cup:
  - Winners: 1889–90
  - Runners-up: 1890–91
- Linlithgowshire Cup/Rosebery Cup:
  - Winners: 1885–86, 1886–87, 1890–91
  - Runners-up: 1884–85, 1888–89
- East of Scotland Shield:
  - Runners-up: 1890–91
