= Uphall F.C. =

Former association football club in Scotland

Uphall
- Full name: Uphall Football Club
- Founded: 1907
- Dissolved: 1909
- Ground: Goschen Park
- Secretary: John Carlyle
Home colours

Uphall Football Club was a football club from Uphall in West Lothian.

== History ==
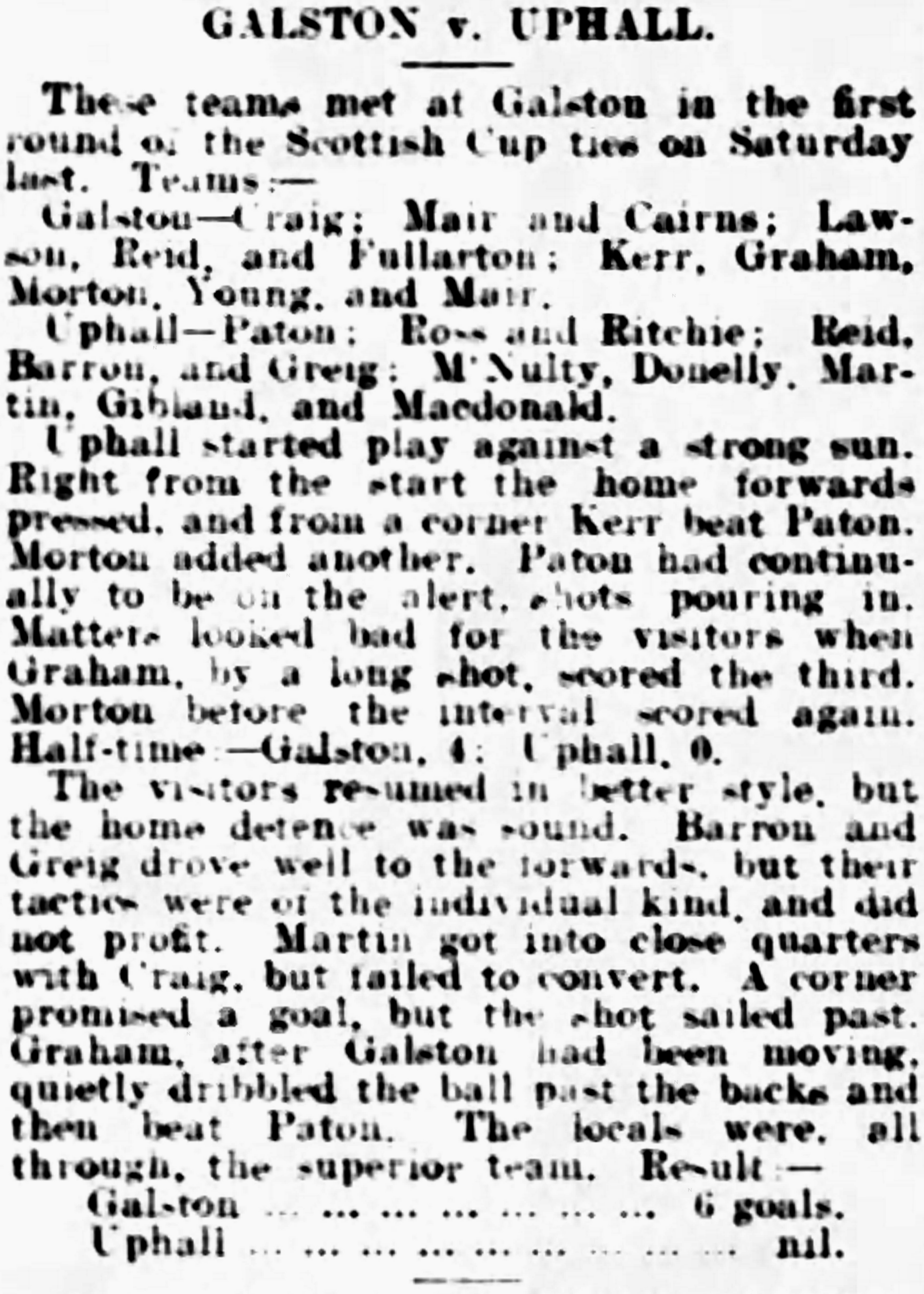
Report on the club's Scottish Cup First Round defeat, Lothian Courier, 24 January 1908

The club was the second senior football club to bear the name of the town; an earlier Uphall had played in the East of Scotland League in 1893–94. The second club was founded on 1 May 1907 by gentlemen wishing to see senior football return to Uphall, and office holders and a committee were immediately chosen. The club signed a number of players very quickly, including Peter Greig of Dunfermline Athletic, two junior internationals, and the former international goalkeeper M'Wattie, subject to clearance to play as an amateur.

Uphall was admitted to the Scottish Football Association in time for the 1907–08 season and the club's first match was a 4–4 draw against the third incarnation of Broxburn Shamrock, Uphall throwing away a four-goal lead.

The club's first competitive match was a 4–2 defeat to West Calder Swifts F.C. in the East of Scotland Cup's qualifying section in September. Having failed to qualify for the main section of a regional tournament, the club unexpectedly qualified for the main section of the national tournament. In the first round of the Scottish Qualifying Cup in 1907–08, the club beat Broxburn Shamrock in a replay, which, like the original tie, was held at Goschen Park, as Shamrock's new ground was not ready. In the second qualifying round, Uphall beat Clackmannan F.C. 2–1 in a replay, with a freak winner from Forbes as Clackmannan goalkeeper Paterson wrongly thought his weak shot was going wide.

By beating Aberdeen University 3–0 in the third round, Uphall guaranteed entry into the Scottish Cup proper; despite the importance of the match there was only a "small attendance". The club's Qualifying Cup run ended at Dumfries F.C. in the next round, and in the first round proper the club was unlucky to be drawn at Galston F.C. rather than a Scottish League club. The club went down to a 6–0 defeat.

The 1907–08 season had been a good one for the club in local competition. It had reached the semi-final of the King Cup, for members of the East of Scotland FA, and was runner-up in the Free Gardeners' Cup, an invitational charity competition, albeit not having to play a semi-final as Broxburn Shamrock's East of Scotland Cup tie took precedence; Uphall lost 2–0 to Bathgate F.C. in the final. The club did however win one trophy, namely the East of Scotland Consolation Cup competition, drawing 2–2 with Selkirk F.C. in the original final at Whitestone Park in Peebles, equalizing with 3 minutes to go by bundling Selkirk goalkeeper Hewitson over the goal-line while he was still holding the ball. The replay at Galashiels was a 3–2 win for Uphall; MacRitchie (2) and Gibland putting Uphall 3–0 to the good, but a Souters comeback saw the club rely on Sam Paton in goal to hold onto the lead.

For the 1908–09 season, the club brought in three players from the now-defunct Broxburn Shamrock, but Uphall lost in the first round of the King Cup, the East of Scotland Qualifying Cup, and the Scottish Qualifying Cup, all by mid-September. The starting line-up in the Qualifying Cup defeat to Broxburn Athletic was entirely different to the side which had reached the first round the season before.

Without the income from competitive matches, the club was in a shambolic state by the start of 1909. In January 1909, the club was set to host Bathgate in the Scottish Consolation Cup. Only a handful of spectators - mostly from Bathgate - attended; the Uphall side entered the pitch ten minutes late; there was no sign of a match ball; and three of the regular Uphall players were replaced by juniors. Uphall therefore scratched from the tie and the match was played as a friendly, with "the players indulging in a lot of tom-foolery", and, although the game only ran to an hour, Bathgate won 9–0.

Two months later, the club failed to turn up for a home tie in the Linlithgowshire Cup against Broxburn Athletic F.C., not only being unable to raise a team, but not even notifying the Athletic. Before the start of the 1909–10 season, the Scottish Football Association struck the club off for non-payment of subscriptions.

== Colours ==
The club played in blue and white striped jerseys.

== Ground ==
The club's home ground was Goschen Park, midway between Uphall and Broxburn; it had previously been the home of Broxburn Shamrock.
