= Linlithgowshire Cup =

- Founded: 1884
- Abolished: 1926
- Region: Linlithgowshire
- Teams: highest: 14 (1884–85)
- Most championships: Bo'ness (13 wins)

The Linlithgowshire Cup was an association football cup competition for senior clubs in the historic county of Linlithgowshire, Scotland. The competition was founded in 1884 and the last completed competition was in the 1925–26 season.

== Format ==
The competition was a knock-out tournament contested by the member clubs of the Linlithgowshire Football Association; the motive force for the setting-up of the Linlithgowshire FA, in 1884, was James Carlow of Bellstane Birds, who approached Lord Rosebery to provide patronage for a cup as a prize for local clubs. The trophy was sometimes called the Rosebery Cup.

== Initial entrants ==
- Addiewell
- Armadale
- Bellstane Birds
- Bo'ness
- Broxburn Harp
- Broxburn Shamrock
- Broxburn Thistle
- Durhamtown Rangers (later renamed Erin Rovers and Bathgate Rovers)
- Fauldhouse Hibernian
- Grange Athletic
- Kinneil Star
- Linlithgow
- Mossend Swifts
- Uphall Bluebell

== History ==
The first competition, in 1884–85, ended in some embarrassment. In one of the semi-finals, Mossend Swifts beat Durhamtown Rangers, who then protested on the basis that Mossend was not actually in Linlithgowshire, and so the club should not be allowed to enter. Mossend pointed out that it had been invited to join the association and paid its scrip; the Rangers produced a letter from setting out the terms of the competition, namely it was for clubs in the county only. After some measurement revealed that Mossend was 100 yards beyond the shire border, the Swifts were allowed to play the final, which his Lordship considered "quite satisfactory", and the Swifts beat Armadale 3–2 at Bo'ness in the final. For the 1885–86 tournament, the Linlithgowshire Association simply "forgot" to invite the Swifts to defend the trophy, which did not have a winner inscribed for 1884–85.

The final in 1892–93 was not played to a finish. Broxburn had come from 2–0 down against Bathgate Rovers to level the match, and, after a header appeared to have crossed the goal-line, appealed for a third goal. Referee James Archer gave the goal after consulting with a linesman, while the Rovers complained that the ball had gone "10 inches" over the bar (for which there was some support from Mr Brodie of Bo'ness, at the match in his role as a Linlithgowshire FA committee member). "After some fruitless minutes had been spent in altercation" on the pitch, the Rovers walked off, and Broxburn waited with Mr Archer until the expiration of time.

The rise of professionalism and League football killed off many of the village clubs. By 1898–99, the competition had 6 entries, and one of those (Bellstane Birds) withdrew before playing a match; the competition was not played at all in 1899–1900 and in 1900–01 only one match took place. The situation scarcely improved over the next few years, with clubs merging to stay alive, and the competition restricted to the few clubs that had a precarious foothold in the Scottish League or a similar competition which could generate a regular income.

The 1904–05 final was particularly fraught. The initial game, at Newton Park, was abandoned after 82 minutes, with Bathgate leading Broxburn by a goal to nil, after the spectators "broke in". The second game ended 1–0 to Broxburn, but Bathgate protested successfully that Broxburn was playing a professional (Finnigan) who had not been cleared to play. The third match (like the second, at Shamrock Park in Broxburn) ended in a draw after extra-time. The deciding match did not take place until September 1905, Bathgate finally emerging victorious 3–2.

Two other finals saw matches abandoned, both times due to weather. In 1909–10 the game was stopped at 65 minutes with the scores level, the abandonment bringing "few regrets". The 1924–25 final was first postponed because of a storm when both teams were ready to kick-off, and the second attempt abandoned after half-an-hour; despite the game taking place in April, a snowstorm suddenly descended, making play impossible.

From the 1914–15 tournament until 1925–26, the competition only had four entries - the second Armadale club, Bo'ness, Broxburn United (a merger of the second Broxburn club and Broxburn Athletic, and Bathgate. The competition finally ground to a halt in 1926–27, when Bo'ness left the Linlithgowshire Association for the Stirlingshire, and, with only three senior members left, the Linlithgowshire Association disbanded after drawing the one round of the competition required.

== Finals ==
Year	Winner	Score	Runner-up
1884–85	Mossend Swifts	3–2	Armadale (1)
1885–86	Armadale (1)	2–1	Broxburn Shamrock (1)
1886–87	Armadale (1)	2–2, 2–0	Durhamtown Rangers
1887–88	Bo'ness	4-3	Erin Rovers
1888–89	Bo'ness	1–0	Armadale (1)
1889–90	Broxburn (1)	7–0	Bellstane Birds
1890–91	Armadale (1)	2–0	Bo'ness
1891–92	Bathgate Rovers	4–0	Broxburn Shamrock (2)
1892–93	Broxburn (1)	3–2	Bathgate Rovers
1893–94	Broxburn Shamrock (2)	4–0	Linlithgow Athletoc
1894–95	Bathgate	5–4	Bo'ness
1895–96	Bo'ness	3–0	Armadale Volunteers
1896–97	Armadale Volunteers	1–1, 3–0	Broxburn Shamrock (2)
1897–98	Bo'ness	3–0	Armadale Volunteers
1898–99	Bo'ness	2–1	Bathgate
1899–1900	n/a	n/a	n/a
1900–01	Bo'ness	3–0	Bathgate
1901–02	Bo'ness	3–1	Broxburn (2)
1902–03	Broxburn (2)	1–0	Bo'ness
1903–04	Broxburn (2)	2–0	Bathgate
1904–05	Bathgate	1a0, 0–1, 1–1, 3–2	Broxburn (2)
1905–06	Bathgate	1–1, 4–2	Bo'ness
1906–07	Bo'ness	2–1	Broxburn (2)
1907–08	Broxburn (2)	2–2, 1–1, 4–1	Broxburn Athletic
1908–09	Bo'ness	2–1	Bathgate
1909–10	Bo'ness	2a2, 1–0	Broxburn Athletic
1910–11	Bathgate	1–1, 2–1	Bo'ness
1911–12	Bathgate	5–2	Broxburn Athletic
1912–13	Armadale (2)	2–1	Broxburn United
1913–14	Broxburn United	2–1	Armadale (2)
1914–15	Broxburn United	2–1	Bo'ness
1915–16	Armadale (2)	2–1	Bathgate
1916–17	Armadale (2)	2–1	Broxburn United
1917–19	n/a	n/a	n/a
1919–20	Bathgate	2–0	Armadale (2)
1920–21	Bo'ness	2–0	Bathgate
1921–22	Armadale (2)	1–0	Bo'ness
1922–23	Broxburn United	3–0	Armadale (2)
1923–24	Broxburn United	1–0	Armadale (2)
1924–25	Bo'ness	0a1, 4–1	Armadale (2)
1925–26	Bo'ness	3–1	Bathgate
