= Broxburn Shamrock F.C. =

Former association football club in Scotland

Broxburn Shamrock
- Full name: Broxburn Shamrock Football Club
- Nicknames: The Shamrock, the Greens, the Miners
- Founded: 1891
- Dissolved: 1898
- Ground: Shamrock Park, Pyothall Road
Home colours

Broxburn Shamrock F.C. was an association football club from Broxburn in West Lothian, which once reached the semi-final of the Scottish Cup.

== History ==
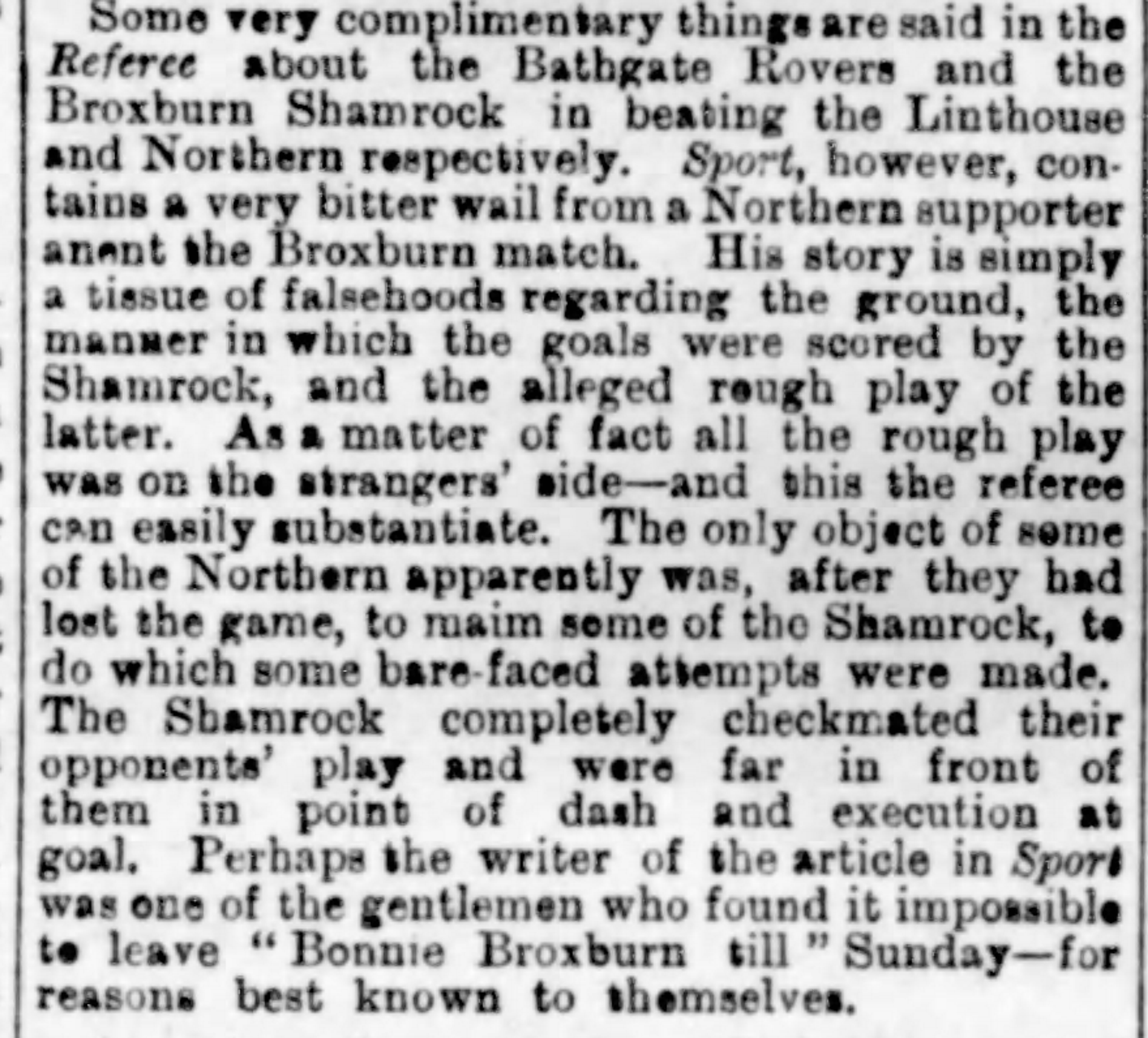
The Lothian media defending Broxburn Shamrock from accusations of dirty play against Northern (Glasgow) in the 1891-92 Scottish Cup; Rutherglen Reformer, 4 December 1891

There were four clubs which took the Broxburn Shamrock name:

- the first existed from 1881 to 1888;
- the second (this club) from 1891 to 1897;
- the third from 1903 to 1908;
- the fourth from 1909 to 1914.

The second Shamrock, described as a "resuscitated" club, played its first game was at Redcraig Athletic of mid-Calder in a friendly in February 1891. After a half-season of friendly matches, the club successfully applied to become a member of the Eastern Football Alliance, albeit in the teeth of some opposition from the committee who suggested delaying the club's application.

The Eastern Alliance did not conclude its first season; Shamrock was in second place at the time, two points off the lead with a game in hand. The club's first home league game was the "New Reekie" derby against Broxburn F.C.; it was abandoned after 40 minutes due to a storm, with the Shamrock 3–2 ahead - the Greens won the second attempt 2–1, despite "a rather rough element" towards the end of the match which saw Shamrock's M'Cann ordered off.

The club's first entry in the Scottish Cup saw the club win through three qualifying rounds and gaining a bye in the fourth - one of the ties being a win over Campsie F.C. in a replayed tie after a protest, based on bad weather and the ground being "in several places flooded with water", overturned the original Shamrock win - to enter the competition proper; after beating Northern F.C. of Glasgow 7–2 at home in the first round, Shamrock lost in the second, 5–4 at home to the Cup holders Heart of Midlothian. The club was handicapped by not having captain Meechan playing; although the Scottish game was strictly amateur at the time, there were certain ways around this, and Meechan apparently felt undervalued, that "he was disappointed at the size of a subscription raised for him during the time he was off work".

=== Scottish Cup semi-final ===
The club's second Scottish Cup entry, in 1892–93, would turn out even better. After again winning through four qualifying rounds to reach the competition proper, the club would progress to the semi-finals, its victims including St Mirren F.C., who would finish third in the Scottish League that season; however, ominously, the club's tie with the Buddies only attracted a small crowd, a much bigger crowd going to Albyn Park to watch Broxburn lose to Hearts in the East of Scotland Shield. St Mirren protested about the "indecent language" from the crowd - the referee, Mr M'Lean of Ayr, stating that "he had never officiated before a more excited crowd, and he feared had St Mirrens [sic] won he would have been subjected to much abuse" but the protest was dismissed on the basis of it not being correctly lodged; instead the SFA censured the Shamrock.

The club played Queen's Park F.C. at Hampden Park in the semi-final, in front of 7,000 spectators, the crowd reduced by the view that it would be a foregone conclusion for the home side. Shamrock duly went out to the eventual Cup winners, although the score was only 4–2, a possible third goal denied after defender Smellie handled on the line, but no penalty was given, "to the no small chagrin of the Shamrock supporters". However, the Shamrock was criticised for being the "roughest team ever seen at Hampden", with a "very perverted conception of Association football"; the club had "made a careful study of the peculiarities of the physical game...the game on Saturday was one of the foulest witnessed in Glasgow for a long time." The local media were kinder, blaming the referee for "not using his prerogative" and asserting that "shady and disagreeable tactics were being brought in by both sides". Queen's Park had to play the second half with ten men, due to an injury to William Lambie, put down as being the result of a "crippling" (Glasgow Herald) or a "collision" (Lothian Courier).

=== Post-professionalism decline ===
The Scottish FA permitted professional football from the start of the 1893–94 season, which was a blow to the Broxburn sides; the town was barely large enough to support one professional club, let alone two. The Shamrock did not need to enter the qualifying rounds in the 1893–94 Scottish Cup, and went 3–1 up in the first round proper tie at home to Arbroath F.C., but conceded seven goals without reply in the second half; reserve goalkeeper Keast fumbled the ball over the line to make the score 3–2, the Shamrock then "played the man rather than the ball", and with the score 3–3 Keast was sent off "for rough play".

The club had more success on the local level. The new East of Scotland League also did not complete a full season, Shamrock holding an 8 point lead with half of the fixtures completed, but the club did win the Linlithgowshire Cup for the only time, beating Linlithgow Athletic F.C. 4–0 at Bathgate in the final.

The Arbroath match was the club's final tie in the Scottish Cup proper, with any promising players being taken by richer sides. Before the start of the 1894–95 season, the Shamrock took over the Broxburn club, on the basis the village was too small to compete with split loyalties. In the wake of this, the club did gain its biggest competitive win in the first qualifying round in 1894–95, beating Loch Rangers of Kingseat 11–0. However the club lost 3–1 at Camelon F.C. in the second round, despite taking the lead. The club did not enter the Cup in 1895–96, and lost in the qualifying rounds in 1896–97.

The decline in local football was shown by the Linlithgowshire Cup having reduced to 5 clubs for 1896–97, Shamrock losing in the final to the Armadale Volunteers side in a replay, but the club did not enter the competition or the King Cup for East of Scotland sides again, and lost in the first round of the East of Scotland Shield in 1897–98 (again to Armadale Volunteers). The club did enter the Scottish Cup in 1897–98 and 1898–99, but scratched both times, the second time taken as evidence that senior football in Broxburn was "completely dead".

== Colours ==
The club's colours were green and white, the jerseys being plain green.

== Ground ==
The club's first home match was played at the Sports Field in Broxburn. For the 1891–92 season, T.P. Doyle, owner of the Buchan Arms hotel, leased a ground at Pyothall Road, opened with a match against the Adventurers F.C. of Edinburgh, "opposite the refinery, the entrance being by Port Buchan", although it was "a bit out of the way". The ground was soon named Shamrock Park and was notorious for its narrowness.

== Honours ==
- Scottish Cup:
  - Best run: semi-finalists 1892–93
- Linlithgowshire Cup:
  - Winners: 1893–94
  - Runners-up: 1891–92, 1896–97
- King Cup:
  - Best run: semi-finalists 1892–93
- East of Scotland Shield:
  - Best run: semi-finalists 1896–97

== Notable players ==
- Peter Meechan, the club's first captain, who won championship titles in both England and Scotland
- George Allan, one-time record goalscorer for Liverpool F.C. and Scottish Championship winner with Celtic F.C.
