= Bellstane Birds F.C. =

Former association football club in Scotland

Bellstane Birds
- Full name: Bellstane Birds Football Club
- Nickname(s): the Birds
- Founded: 1881
- Dissolved: 1894
- Ground: Bird's Park
- Match Secretary: James Carlow
Home colours

Bellstane Birds Football Club was a Scottish association football club based in Queensferry, West Lothian.

== History ==
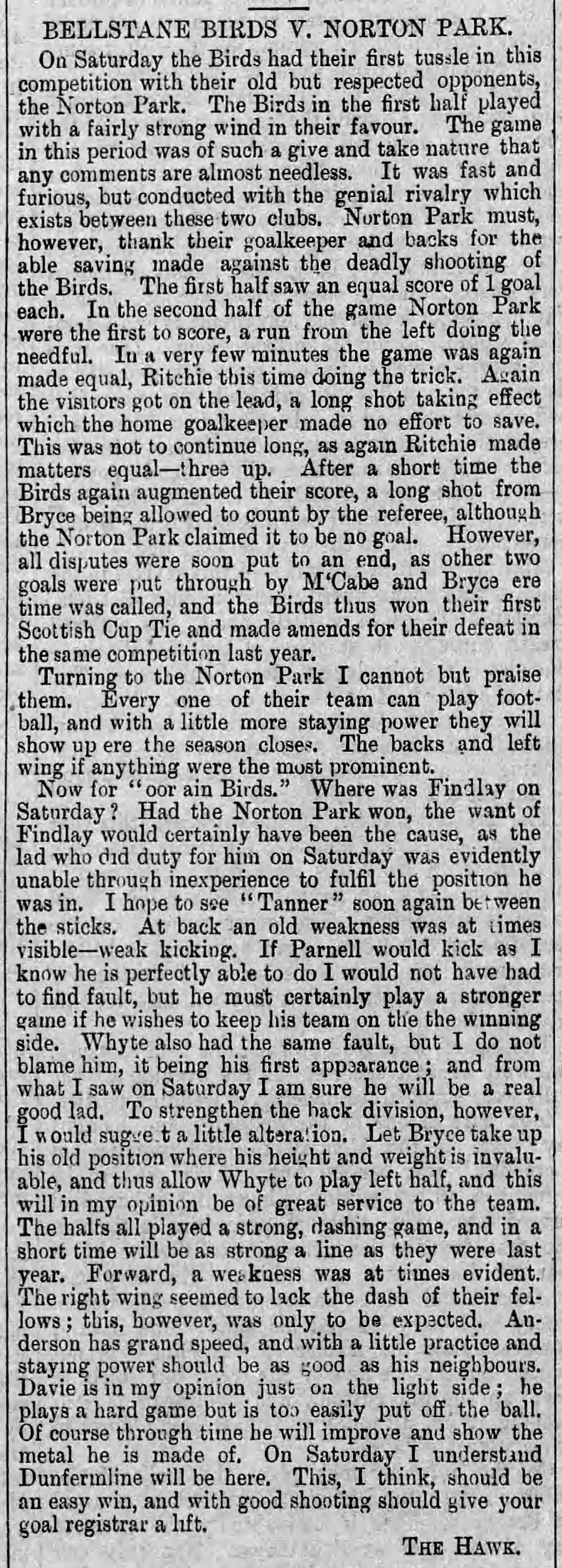
The Birds' only Scottish Cup win, Lothian Courier, 14 September 1889

The club played its first recorded match in October 1881, a 1–0 win over the first Broxburn Shamrock club. For the first season of activity the club was often referred to as the Queensferry Bellstane Birds. The club's name derives from a carving in the town centre depicting an owl on a stone bell, representing the original bell which signified the start of the market.

Although not a large club, the Birds were influential in football in Linlithgowshire, considered "the most enterprising club that has ever been in the county"; the Linlithgowshire FA was set up in 1884 by the Birds' James Carlow, who approached Lord Rosebery to provide patronage for a cup as a prize for local clubs. Lord Rosebery was also a patron of the club, along with other connected individuals, such as Lord Hopetoun and future Prime Minister Henry Campbell-Bannerman.

The Birds took a momentous step by joining the Scottish Football Association in August 1886, entitling the club to enter the Scottish Cup. It did so from 1886–87 until 1890–91, the last year before the Scottish FA introduced qualifying rounds. The only time the club won a tie was in 1889–90, when it beat the Edinburgh side Norton Park 6–3. The club's reward was a second round home tie with Heart of Midlothian. 800 Hearts fans followed their club to Queensferry, and were shocked when Duffy gave the home side the lead "amid deafening cheers". However, by half-time the visitors were 2–1 to the good, and the game finished 4–1 in their favour.

The club never won a trophy of note, four times being runner-up in local competitions. In the 1888–89 Percival King Cup, for clubs in the east of Scotland, the Birds lost to Broxburn in the final at Champfleurie; the Birds suffered their defeat in good part, delighted at having reached the final. In 1889–90, the Birds had an unwanted triple, losing to the same side in the Linlithgowshire Cup final in February 1890, this time suffering a 7–0 defeat. One week later the club lost again in the King Cup final, this time to Armadale, by 5–2. And six weeks after that, the Birds lost 3–0 to Bo'ness in the final of the Consolation Cup at Champfleurie for the East of Scotland Shield.

The club's best chance of success was in the one-off Linlithgowshire Charity Cup in 1885–86; the club walked off the pitch in the semi-final with Armadale, after Armadale had been awarded an equalizer for a scrimmage that did not get within "three feet of the goal" (emphasis in original report). Armadale beat the Bathgate Volunteers 9–0 in the final.

The club's final reported match was a 3–1 defeat at home to the second Broxburn Shamrock in the King's Cup in November 1894. The name was revived for other clubs afterwards, including one active from 1896 to 1898. The club also had an unexpected afterlife in the Transvaal, as some Queensferry men started a football club there in 1896, under the Bellstane Birds name.

== Colours ==
The club's colours were red and blue.

== Ground ==
The Birds played at Bird's Park in Queensferry.
