= Champfleurie F.C. =

Former association football club in Scotland

Champfleurie
- Full name: Champfleurie Football Club
- Nickname(s): the Celestials
- Founded: 1886
- Dissolved: 1891
- Ground: Champfleurie Park
Home colours

Champfleurie Football Club was a football club from Kingscavil in West Lothian.

== History ==
The club was formed in 1886 and named after the house of an early benefactor. Champfleurie's first competitive fixtures came in the Linlithgowshire Cup in 1886–87; after losing two friendlies to the Bathgate Volunteers, the first by 10 goals to nil, the Celestials brought in "football experts" which changed the entire XI, and Champfleurie beat the Volunteers 2–1 in the first round of the cup, despite a protest from the Volunteers that one of the Celestials was a professional athlete, having received a cash prize at the Slamannan games. Champfleurie lost 4–0 in the second round at Bellstane Birds.

The club entered the three main local competitions (the Edinburgh Shield, for members of the East of Scotland Football Association, the King Cup for smaller clubs in the east of Scotland, and the Linlithgowshire Cup, for members solely from the county of Linlithgowshire) from 1886–87 to 1890–91. The club's best run in the most prestigious of the three, the Shield, was to the quarter-final in 1889–90, the club then scratching when drawn to play Cowdenbeath. Champfleurie reached the semi-final of the other two tournaments; the former in its first entry in 1886–87, the latter in its last entry in 1890–91. The club lost its King Cup semi-final tie in 1887 to Burntisland Thistle 1–0, the only goal coming when goalkeeper Sneddon was charged over the goal-line while still holding the ball.

However, by 1890 the combination of professional football and leagues starting up had reduced the Linlithgowshire FA to a mere 8 clubs, and, without four of its regular players, Champfleurie lost the county cup semi-final 10–0 at Bo'ness - a defeat that was 9 goals worse than the same fixture two months before.

The club also entered the Scottish Cup, its first entry coming in 1888–89. Drawn to play Armadale, failings within the organization of the club led to a scratch team being thrown together for the tie, with players not knowing they had been chosen until three days before the tie; Armadale won 12–0. In 1890, the Champfleurie second XI gained revenge for the parent club, beating the Armadale second XI at Captain Park in Linlithgow to win the Linlithgowshire Second XI Cup. The match finished 9–4 to Champfleurie, who were helped by the Dale's Gallacher being sent off (while his side was 3–2 to the good) for threatening the referee.

Things went better in 1889–90. Champfleurie held Bathgate Rovers to a 3–3 draw at the latter's Boghead ground, albeit in front of a crowd of "no more than two dozen", and the Rovers - who had been forced to choose a scratch team for the original match - were unable to raise a team for the replay at Champfleurie. The Celestials had a plum tie of Heart of Midlothian at home in the second round, and were not disgraced in losing 5–0, the score only being 1–0 at half-time and Hearts flattered by goals in the 80th and 90th minute. The club's final entry was in 1890–91, losing 5–3 at Penicuik Athletic.

Although the club seemed to be in generally good order, and took part in five-a-side football matches over the summer of 1891 (including winning the Foresters' Games tournament at Linlithgow), it had not entered any tournaments for 1891–92 and seems to have become defunct before the start of the season.

== Colours ==
The club played in red jerseys and navy shorts.

== Ground ==
The club played at Champfleurie Park, which was used as the final venue for the Linlithgowshire and King Cups a number of times. The highest recorded attendance for a Champfleurie match was 700, for the Cup tie with Hearts.

== Notable players ==
- Matt McQueen, full-back, who played for Champfleurie in 1887 and 1888–89.
- Hugh McQueen, Matt's brother, also played for Champfleurie in 1888–89.
