= Adventurers F.C. =

Former association football club in Scotland

Adventurers
- Full name: Adventurers Football Club
- Nicknames: the Advents, the City Lads, the Capitalists
- Founded: 1883
- Dissolved: 1907
- Ground: Slateford Road
- Hon. Secretary: Thomas Common
Home colours

Adventurers Football Club was a Scottish association football club based in Edinburgh.

== History ==
The earliest recorded matches for the club are from 1883, and for its first few years played at a junior level.

=== Scottish Cup ===
In 1888 the club turned senior by joining the Scottish Football Association and entered the 1888–89 Scottish Cup. Its first match in the national competition was a 6–2 win at Linlithgow Athletic but it lost 9–3 at Broxburn in the second. The Adventurers had been 3–1 to the good at half-time, but its goalkeeper was unable to play the second half because of an injury.

The club never won another tie in the main rounds of the Cup. In the 1890–91 Scottish Cup, it reached the third round, having lost 7–0 at St Bernards in the first. However the staunchly amateur Adventurers protested that St Bernards had been paying players illegally. The cause was taken up by Dunfermline Athletic, upset that one of its players (James Ross) had been induced to leave the Athletic to play for the Saints, for a promise of 10s per match. The consequences of the protest were profound. St Bernards was disqualified for professionalism and the Adventurers re-instated; St Bernards was further suspended from all football for a month, during which period the club played a friendly against Renton, which saw Renton expelled from the newly instituted Scottish League and ultimately both clubs expelled from the Association. Adventurers meanwhile gained a bye into the third round, and was hammered 12–0 by Leith Athletic.

=== King Cup ===
The Scottish FA introduced qualifying rounds, and then a qualifying cup, from 1891–92 onwards and the Advents did not reach the first round proper again. However the Advents proved to be one of the more enduring non-league clubs in Edinburgh, being regular entrants to the two main local competitions - the Edinburgh (later East of Scotland) Shield and the King Cup - until 1905–06. The club never won either tournament. It reached the King Cup final in 1891–92, and was 4–2 up against Bathgate Rovers at Broxburn, thanks to two goals from Baxter and one each from Common and Mackenzie, deep into the final, but the Rovers scored two late goals. The replay was again held on Albion Park, with many of the locals preferring to support the Adventurers, but this time the Rovers - augmented by adding "China" Fleming to the starting XI - won 2–0; the Advents handicapped by losing Hastie to a family bereavement and relying on the less effective Nicol.

The club appeared to have reached the final three years later, beating Raith Rovers 2–1 in the semi-final, coming from behind with two goals for which the Advents "scrimmaged through" the Rovers goalkeeper along with the ball. However Rovers successfully protested about the non-registration of Allan and won the replay 4–2, coming from 2–1 down.

=== Edinburgh/East of Scotland Shield ===
The club was less successful in the more prestigious competition. To start with, it was generally knocked out in the early rounds, but had some good runs in the Consolation Cup for eliminated clubs. The Advents were fancied to beat Leith Harp in the Consolation's 1887–88 semi-final at Tynecastle Park, but their play was "devoid of almost anything like enthusiasm", and they were beaten 2–0. The Advents did finally reach the final of the Consolation Cup in 1891–92, but lost 3–2 to the village side Lassodie, after squandering a number of second half chances.

The club had an unexpected improvement of its chances in the main competition in 1894–95, as the League teams in Edinburgh disdained to enter. Adventurers took advantage by reaching the final for the only time, but lost 4–0 to Bo'ness at Linlithgow. It was the high point for the club in the competition as it struggled to get past the first round, or, indeed, the qualifying competition when that was introduced in 1897–98.

However, after several years without winning a tie, in 1902–03, the club had a fortunate series of draws in the Consolation Cup, including a bye and a scratching, to reach the final. Bo'ness had the bulk of chances, but could not convert any, and the Adventurers, led by Charleston up front, earned their only trophy with a 3–0 win.

=== Eastern Alliance/League ===
The rise of the Scottish League meant that clubs over the nation looked for alternative league competition. In the east of Scotland, in 1891–92, a number of clubs formed the Eastern Alliance, and the Adventurers were invited to join after Leith Hibernian withdrew before the season's start. The competition did not last a full season, the Adventurers winning 3 of its 10 matches, out of 14 scheduled.

The club's second attempt at League football was in the Eastern League, and the club was a founder member in 1904–05. The number of clubs in Edinburgh, and the club's amateurism, had eroded the club's player base, and in two seasons it did not win a single match; its final home game in May 1906, a 6–0 defeat to Broxburn Athletic, attracted a crowd of 300, and secretary Martin announced the club would not seek re-election as it was unlikely to play in 1906–07. Indeed, the club never played again, its end confirmed by its being struck off the Scottish Football Association's roll in May 1907.

== Colours ==
The club's original colour was white shirts with blue knickers. In 1890 the club changed its shirts to dark blue and white, In 1892 the club changed to its trademark dark blue, light blue, and white vertical stripes, with blue shorts, which remained the club's colours until changing to navy in 1901.

== Ground ==
The club originally played at Stockbridge Park. By the time the club turned senior, it was playing on Gorgie Park on the Slateford Road. The Vale of Leven Wanderers refused to play a Scottish Cup tie there because it claimed the ground was part of a public park, which meant no gate money. The Scottish FA however turned down the Wanderers' protest. Towards the end of the 1894–95 season the club moved to a new ground, still however on the Slateford Road.

The club's final season in 1905–06 was played at Mill Park in Musselburgh.

== Honours ==
- East of Scotland Shield
  - Runners-up: 1894–95
- East of Scotland Consolation Cup
  - Winners: 1902–03
  - Runners-up: 1891–92
- King Cup
  - Runners-up: 1891–92
