= Mossend Swifts F.C. =

Association football club in Scotland

Mossend Swifts FC
- Full name: Mossend Swifts FC
- Founded: 1880
- Dissolved: 1903
- Ground: Mossend Park (1888-1903)
- Owner: Robert Robb
| Home colours | Change colours |

Mossend Swifts were a Scottish senior football club from the shale mining village of Mossend, just to the north of the town of West Calder, West Lothian. There is now little left of this village (not to be confused with Mossend in North Lanarkshire – contiguous with Bellshill – which also had teams operating in the same era).

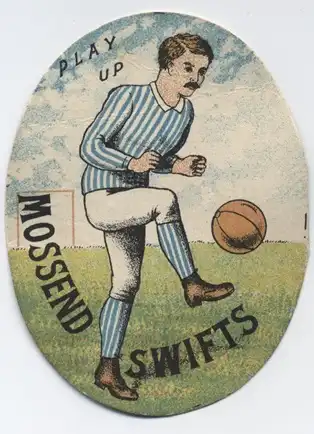
Mossend Swifts support card

== History ==
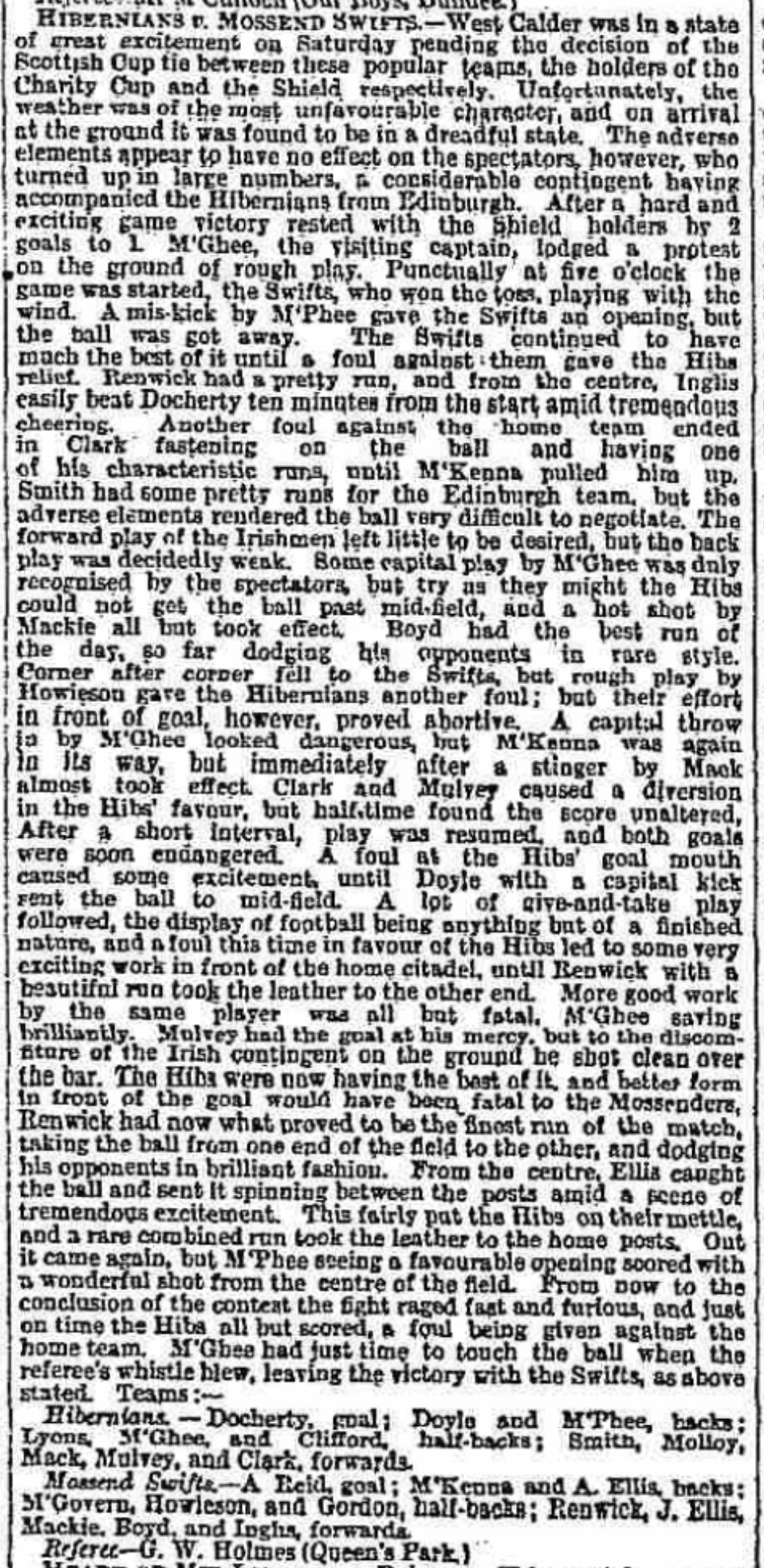
1888–89 Scottish Cup 1st Round, Mossend Swifts 2–1 Hibernian, Scotsman, 3 September 1888

The club was founded in 1880.

The Swifts won the first Linlithgowshire Cup - also known as Lord Rosebery's Cup - in 1884–85 unusual circumstances. In the semi-final, the Swifts beat Durhamtown Rangers, who then protested on the basis that Mossend was not actually in Linlithgowshire, and so the club should not be allowed to enter. Mossend pointed out that it had been invited to join the association and paid its scrip; the Rangers produced a letter from Lord Rosebery setting out the terms of the competition, namely it was for clubs in the county only. The compromise was to let the Swifts complete the tournament, which his Lordship considered "quite satisfactory", and the Swifts beat Armadale 3–2 at Bo'ness in the final. For the 1885–86 tournament, the Linlithgowshire Association simply "forgot" to invite the Swifts to defend the trophy, which had not had the Swifts' name inscribed thereon.

The club joined the Scottish Football Association in August 1886 and entered the Scottish Cup from 1886–87. Its first season as a senior club saw it win the King Cup (for members of the East of Scotland FA), beating Burntisland Thistle 4–1 in the final; the club went behind in the first five minutes, but goals from Howieson, Boyd, and Ellis put the Swifts 3–1 up at the break, and the Swifts employed a tactical change - Howieson stepping back to midfield, to make two banks of four in front of the full-backs - to preserve the lead. Ellis rounded off the scoring with a long, low shot late on.

The club's best run in the national competition came in 1888–89, reaching the final 16; in the first round the Swifts caused a major shock by defeating Hibernian 2–1at Mossend Park in front of a crowd of 2,000. The club was eliminated in the fifth round at Dumbarton; the club was unlucky as the original tie was declared a friendly because of a waterlogged pitch, and, as the Swifts had drawn 1–1 (albeit in a match of one hour's duration), it lost the potential to host the replay. The Swifts protested its defeat in the re-played tie on the grounds of roughness on the part of Dumbarton, but to no avail; although the referee reported Dumbarton's Madden to the Scottish FA for repeated tripping, he also reported the Swifts' Ellis and Mackay for kicking their opponents in the stomach, Mackay kicking Stewart so hard that Stewart was knocked unconscious for an hour.

Already by 1891 there was talk of a possible merger with West Calder F.C. on the basis that West Calder could not support two football clubs. Nevertheless, the Swifts continued successfully for a number of years, including winning the King Cup and East of Scotland Shield (the new name for the Edinburgh Shield) in 1895–96, both times beating Polton Vale in the final. The club had an easy 4–1 in the former, in front of 2,000 spectators at Bathgate; a Vale protest was dismissed for lateness.

The Shield was a different matter, the Swifts apparently losing 2–1 at Tynecastle Park, but a protest that Vale's left-back Oag and inside-right Phillips for "professional irregularities" was upheld. In the re-played final at Easter Road, the Swifts again won by 4–1.

The merger with finally took place in May 1903, the merger creating a new club, West Calder Swifts F.C.; although the name was a merger of the two teams' names, the combined club played at West Calder's ground, wearing West Calder's kit. The club's trainer however was the Mossend Swifts trainer David Bowman, who finished with 23 years' service at both sides.

== Colours ==
The club originally gave its colours as red and white, and by 1889 was wearing blue and white stripes. From 1900 to the club's end it wore maroon shirts.

The club's change kit was dark blue.

== Ground ==
The club originally played at Burnvale Park. From 1888 it played at Mossend Park.

== Honours ==
East of Scotland Shield

- Winner: 1887–88, 1895–96

King Cup

- Winner 1886–87, 1887–88, 1895–96

East of Scotland Qualifying Cup

- Runner-up 1897–98

Linlithgowshire Cup

- Winner 1884–85

Rosebery Charity Cup

- Winner 1888–89
- Runner-up 1887–88

== Notable former players ==
Two players were capped for Scotland whilst with Mossend Swifts. Robert (Bob) Boyd won two caps against Ireland in 1889 and Wales in 1891. Dave Ellis was one of five brothers who played for Swifts and earned his solitary cap against Ireland in 1892.

- (Scotland) Bob Boyd
- (Scotland) Dave Ellis
- (Scotland) James Ellis
- (Scotland) George Hogg
- (Scotland) Tom Nicol
