= West Calder F.C. =

Association football club in Scotland

West Calder
- Full name: West Calder Football Club
- Founded: 1878
- Dissolved: 1903
- Ground: Burngrange Park
1878–85 colours	1888–97 colours

West Calder was a Scottish senior football club from the town of West Calder, Midlothian.

== History ==
The club was founded in 1878 and entered the Edinburgh Cup in 1879–80 for the first time. The club's first tie, at Bathgate F.C., had the Bathgate Reed Band as pre-match entertainment, and the home side won 2–0.

=== 1881–82 season ===
The club's most successful season was 1881–82. It saw the club enter the Scottish Cup for the first time, and the team reached the quarter-finals, which proved to be its best-ever run. The club's first round tie with Kinleith F.C. was due to take place on 17 September 1881, and the club arranged a "double-header", with a scratch team playing the 42nd Highlanders first, but Kinleith did not turn up. The match instead took place the following week, West Calder scoring four in the second half to win 5–1. The club benefitted from two withdrawals and wins over Brunswick F.C. of Stockbridge and Falkirk F.C. (coming from behind to win 4–2) to reach the quarter-finals at home to Cartvale. West Calder took the lead, against the run of play, after half an hour; the score was still 2–2 early in the second half, but superior fitness for Cartvale on a pitch in "wretched" condition saw the visitors score three more to win 5–2.

The club also reached the semi-final of the Edinburgh Cup, although the tie with the experienced Hibernian F.C. was a step-up in quality for the club, and Hibs won 7–1.

=== Further Edinburgh Cup semi-finals ===
The club reached the semi-final of the Edinburgh Cup twice more, in 1883–84 and 1884–85. The club lost to Edinburgh University F.C. in the latter season; there was a complaint that the university had been exempted until the final four, because of the need to play within term times, and West Calder protested as the field was unfenced, with spectators standing on the playing surface, but the protest was dismissed.

=== King Cup entries ===
The other main local competition for the club was the King Cup, for members of the East of Scotland Football Association, and donated by the athletic outfitter Percival King. The club entered the first edition of the competition in 1886 and played at Broxburn Thistle F.C. in the first round, where, "according to the referee", Thistle won 2–1; "the Thistle got 2 goals for scoring 1, and West Calder got 1 for scoring 3".

The club did not win a tie until 1897–98, when it won through three rounds (and enjoyed a bye) to reach the final, played at the Mossend Swifts F.C. ground in a snowstorm; West Calder lost to Cowdenbeath F.C. 4–2. The following season the club made the final again, this time at Newtown Park in Kirkcaldy, before a crowd of 3,000; despite taking the lead with a long shot from Crawford, the club lost 2–1 to Raith Rovers F.C., before a crowd of 3,000.

=== Difficulties and merger ===
By the late 1880s the club was finding it increasingly difficult to guarantee fixtures, professionalism enticing players away and difficult economic circumstances causing others to look for work outside the area; in 1887–88 alone the club lost 30 of its 130 members. Already by 1891 there was talk of a possible merger with Mossend Swifts on the basis that West Calder could not support two football clubs. After the introduction of qualifying rounds to the Scottish Cup, the club did not make the main section of the draw until 1898–99.

The club won its first-ever trophy in 1892, albeit via its new reserve side (known as the Wanderers) winning the Midlothan Junior Cup, but by 1893 the Wanderers was operating as a separate organization, on the basis that "there was hardly any use carrying on a senior club because of the difficulty in getting senior players, and of keeping them when they had reared them". By 1899 the club was in financial difficulties, with £177 expenditure against £190 income for 1898–99, but excluding several expenses which fell to be paid after the season ended.

The club at least had made the full stages of the Scottish Cup in 1898–99, albeit only having won two ties in the Qualifying Cup, as two byes took the club into the fifth round of the qualifying stage, entitling it to entry into the main stage; one of the ties was an 8–1 win over Mossend Swifts. In the first round, the club beat Forfar Athletic in the first round 5–4 thanks to an 88th minute "long, raking shot, which took everybody by surprise", but lost 3–1 at Port Glasgow Athletic, despite taking the lead, in the second. It also won another trophy, albeit only the prize for winning the Qualifying Competition for the East of Scotland Shield (the renamed Edinburgh Shield), beating Lochgelly United F.C. 3–0 in the final at Mossend Park.

The merger with Mossend Swifts finally took place in May 1903, the merger creating a new club, West Calder Swifts F.C.; although the name was a merger of the two teams' names, the combined club played at West Calder's ground, wearing West Calder's kit. The club's trainer however was the Mossend Swifts trainer David Bowman, who finished with 23 years' service at both sides.

== Colours ==
The club played in the following colours:

- 1878–1885: navy shirt, white knickers, white hose
- 1885–1888: maroon and black halved jerseys, white knickers and hose
- 1888–1897: maroon and black halved jerseys, blue (serge) knickers
- 1897–1902: royal blue shirts, white knickers
- 1902–03: red and black stripes

== Ground ==
The club's ground was Burngrange Park. The facilities were spartan, lacking large dressing rooms, so clubs had to change in the pavilion or in a nearby hotel. The ground was formally fenced off in 1888 at a cost of £22 10s.
