= 1886–87 Scottish Cup =

Scottish Cup
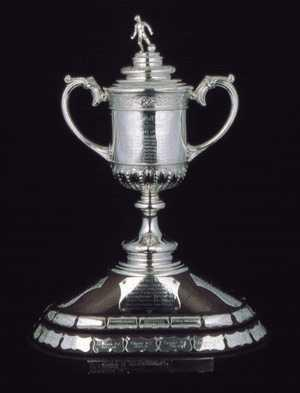
- The Scottish Cup trophy

Tournament details
- Country: Scotland
- Teams: 139

Final positions
- Champions: Hibernian (first title)
- Runners-up: Dumbarton

Tournament statistics
- Matches played: 139
- Goals scored: 855 (6.15 per match)

The 1886–87 Scottish Cup was the 14th season of Scotland's most prestigious football knockout competition. Hibernian won the competition for the first time after they beat Dumbarton 2–1 in the final.

== Calendar ==
| Round | First match date | Fixtures | | | Clubs |
| Round | First match date | Original | Byes | Replays | Clubs |
|---|---|---|---|---|---|
| First Round | 11 September 1886 | 67 | 5 | 6 | 139 → 72 |
| Second Round | 2 October 1886 | 34 | 4 | 6 | 72 → 39 |
| Third Round | 23 October 1886 | 18 | 3 | 1 | 39 → 21 |
| Fourth Round | 6 November 1886 | 5 | 11 | 0 | 21 → 16 |
| Fifth Round | 27 November 1886 | 8 | 0 | 3 | 16 → 8 |
| Quarter-finals | 25 December 1886 | 4 | 0 | 2 | 8 → 4 |
| Semi-finals | 22 January 1887 | 2 | 0 | 0 | 4 → 2 |
| Final | 12 February 1887 | 1 | 0 | 0 | 2 → 1 |

- Two teams qualified for the third round after drawing their second round replay.

== Teams ==
Of the 139 teams, all bar one entered the competition in the first round. Dykehead were admitted into the competition after the first round draw and entered in the second round.

| Dunbartonshire | Edinburghshire | Glasgow and District | | Lanarkshire | Renfrewshire |
|---|---|---|---|---|---|
| Bonhill; Dumbarton; Dumbarton Athletic; Dumbarton Union; Dunbritton; Duntocher; Jamestown; Kirkintilloch Athletic; Kirkintilloch Central; Kirkintilloch Harp; Lenzie; Renton; Vale of Leven; Vale of Leven Hibernian; Vale of Leven Wanderers; Yoker | Armadale; Bellstane Birds; Bo'ness; Broxburn Shamrock; Broxburn Thistle; Durhamstown Rangers; Edina; Heart of Midlothian; Hibernian; Mossend Swifts; Newcastleton; Norton Park; St Bernard's; West Calder | Battlefield; Blairvaddick; Carrick; Clyde; Cowlairs; Govan Athletic; Kelvinside Athletic; Linthouse; Northern; Partick Thistle | Pollokshields Athletic; Queen's Park; Rangers; St Andrew's; St Peter's; Southern Athletic; Thistle; Westbourne; Whitefield; 3rd Lanark RV | Airdriehill; Airdrieonians; Albion Rovers; Cambuslang; Cambuslang Hibernian; Carfin Shamrock; Clydesdale; Drumpellier; Dykehead; Hamilton Academical; Motherwell; Royal Albert; Rutherglen; Shettleston; Tollcross; Wishaw Swifts | Abercorn; Arthurlie; Cartvale; Greenock Rangers; Johnstone; Johnstone Harp; Lochwinnoch; Morton; Neilston; Pollokshaws; Port Glasgow Athletic; Renfrew; St Mirren; Thornliebank; Woodvale; 1st Renfrew RV |
| Ayrshire | Fife | Northern Counties | Perthshire | Southern Counties | Stirlingshire |
| Annbank; Ayr; Ayr Rovers; Cumnock; Dalry; Hurlford; Kilbirnie; Kilmarnock; Lanemark; Lugar Boswell; Maybole; Monkcastle | Alloa Athletic; Burntisland Thistle; Cowdenbeath; Dunfermline; Dunfermline Athletic | Aberdeen; Arbroath; Broughty; Dundee East End; Dundee Harp; Forfar Athletic; Lindertis; Orion; Our Boys (Dundee); Strathmore (Arbroath); Strathmore (Dundee); Wanderers | Caledonian Rangers; Coupar Angus; Crieff; Dunblane; Erin Rovers; Fair City Athletic; Oban; Our Boys (Blairgowrie); St Johnstone | Moffat; Nithsdale; Queen of the South Wanderers; Thornhill; Vale of Annan; Vale o' Nith; 5th Kirkcudbrightshire RV | Avondale; Camelon; Campsie; Dunipace; East Stirlingshire; Falkirk; Grahamston; King's Park; Laurieston; Longcroft Thistle; Slamannan; Vale of Bannock |

== First round ==
=== Matches ===
==== Glasgow and District ====
| 11 September 1886 | Pollokshields Athletic | 2–1 (Void) | St Andrew's | Pollokshields |
| | | | | Stadium: Pollok Park |

| 11 September 1886 | Rangers | 9–1 | Govan Athletic | Kinning Park |
| | Gray; Peacock; Gow | | | Stadium: Kinning Park; Attendance: 500 |

| 11 September 1886 | Battlefield | 0–2 | Cowlairs | Langside |
| | | | | Stadium: Mossfield Park |

| 11 September 1886 | Partick Thistle | 2–3 | Queen's Park | Partick |
| | | | | Stadium: Inchview |

| 11 September 1886 | Thistle | 13–0 | Blairvaddick | Glasgow |
| | | | | Stadium: Beechwood Park |

| 11 September 1886 | Carrick | 0–2 | Westbourne | Possilpark |
| | | | | Stadium: Saracen Park |

| 11 September 1886 | Linthouse | 4–0 | Southern Athletic | Govan |
| | | | | Stadium: Langlands Park |

| 11 September 1886 | Northern | 1–4 | 3rd Lanark RV | Glasgow |
| | | | | Stadium: Hyde Park |

| 11 September 1886 | Kelvinside Athletic | 1–2 | Whitefield | Glasgow |
| | | | | Stadium: Kelburne Street |

| 11 September 1886 | Clyde | 5–1 | St Peter's | Glasgow |
| | | | | Stadium: Barrowfield Park |

==== Renfrewshire district ====
| 11 September 1886 | Lochwinnoch | 0–6 | Morton | Lochwinnoch |
| | | | | Stadium: Field Park |

| 11 September 1886 | Johnstone | 6–2 | Cartvale | Johnstone |
| | | | | Stadium: Cartbank Park |

| 11 September 1886 | Greenock Rangers | 3–4 | 1st Renfrew RV | Greenock |
| | | | | Stadium: Ladyburn Park |

| 11 September 1886 | Thornliebank | 3–2 | Neilston | Thornliebank |
| | | | | Stadium: Deacon's Bank Park |

| 11 September 1886 | Renfrew | 3–3 | Abercorn | Renfrew |
| | | | | Stadium: Glebe Park |

| 11 September 1886 | Port Glasgow Athletic | 10–1 | Johnstone Harp | Port Glasgow |
| | Brown (x2); Coogan (x2); Alexander (x2) | | | Stadium: Clune Park; Attendance: 1,000 |

| 18 September 1886 | St Mirren | 5–3 | Arthurlie | Paisley |
| | | | | Stadium: Westmarch |

| Woodvale | w/o | Pollokshaws |

==== Ayrshire district ====
| 11 September 1886 | Ayr | 2–3 | Hurlford | Ayr |
| | | | | Stadium: Beresford Park |

| 11 September 1886 | Dalry | 5–2 | Ayr Rovers | Dalry |
| | | | | Stadium: Blairland Park |

| 11 September 1886 | Annbank | 3–4 | Kilbirnie | Annbank |
| | | | | Stadium: Pebble Park |

| 11 September 1886 | Monkcastle | 1–3 | Lanemark | Kilwinning |
| | | | | Stadium: Claremont Park |

| Kilmarnock | w/o | Cumnock |

| Lugar Boswell | w/o | Maybole |

==== Dunbartonshire district ====
| 11 September 1886 | Dumbarton Athletic | 8–0 | Duntocher | Dumbarton |
| | | | | Stadium: Burnside Park |

| 11 September 1886 | Vale of Leven | 9–0 | Kirkintilloch Athletic | Alexandria |
| | | | | Stadium: North Street Park |

| 11 September 1886 | Vale of Leven Wanderers | 6–3 | Jamestown | Alexandria |

| 11 September 1886 | Yoker | 4–2 | Dumbarton Union | Yoker |
| | | | | Stadium: Holm Park |

| 11 September 1886 | Dumbarton | 5–0 | Vale of Leven Hibernians | Dumbarton |
| | Brown; Hartley; McMillan; Keir (x2) | | | Stadium: Boghead Park |

| 11 September 1886 | Kirkintilloch Central | 1–8 | Bonhill | Kirkintilloch |
| | | | | Stadium: Springfield |

| Renton | w/o | Kirkintilloch Harp |

| Dunbritton | w/o | Lenzie |

==== Edinburghshire district ====
| 11 September 1886 | St Bernard's | 3–2 | Bo'ness | Edinburgh |
| | | | | Stadium: Powderhall |

| 11 September 1886 | Bellstane Birds | 2–2 | Broxburn Thistle | South Queensferry |
| | | | | Stadium: Bird's Park |

| 11 September 1886 | West Calder | 1–3 | Armadale | West Calder |
| | | | | Stadium: Burngrange Park |

| 11 September 1886 | Hibernian | 6–1 | Durhamstown Rangers | Edinburgh |
| | Groves (x3); Smith; Clarke | | | Stadium: Hibernian Park |

| 11 September 1886 | Edina | 1–7 | Heart of Midlothian | Edinburgh |
| | | | | Stadium: Royal Gymnasium Ground |

| 11 September 1886 | Broxburn Shamrock | 1–2 | Mossend Swifts | Broxburn |
| | | | | Stadium: Easter Park |

| Newcastleton | w/o | Norton Park |

==== Stirlingshire district ====
| 11 September 1886 | Grahamston | 0–2 | Laurieston | Grahamston |
| | | | | Stadium: Crichton Park |

| 11 September 1886 | East Stirlingshire | 6–3 | Camelon | Falkirk |
| | | | | Stadium: Randyford Park |

| 11 September 1886 | Longcroft Thistle | 3–3 | Vale of Bannock | Longcroft |

| 11 September 1886 | Campsie | 10–0 | Dunipace | Lennoxtown |
| | | | | Stadium: Lennox Park |

| 11 September 1886 | King's Park | 1–3 | Falkirk | Stirling |
| | | | | Stadium: Forthbank Park |

| 11 September 1886 | Slamannan | 4–3 | Avondale | Slamannan |
| | | | | Stadium: West Limerigg Park |

==== Fife district ====
Cowdenbeath received a bye to the second round.

| 11 September 1886 | Dunfermline Athletic | 4–8 | Alloa Athletic | Dunfermline |
| | | | | Stadium: East End Park |

| Burntisland Thistle | w/o | Dunfermline |

==== Lanarkshire district ====
Cambuslang Hibernian received a bye to the second round.

| 11 September 1886 | Tollcross | 0–3 | Royal Albert | Tollcross |
| | | | | Stadium: German's Park |

| 11 September 1886 | Rutherglen | 2–0 | Drumpellier | Rutherglen |
| | | | | Stadium: Phoenix Park |

| 11 September 1886 | Airdrieonians | 5–0 | Airdriehill | Airdrie |
| | | | | Stadium: Mavisbank Park |

| 11 September 1886 | Clydesdale | 1–5 | Albion Rovers | Rutherglen |
| | | | | Stadium: Southcroft |

| 11 September 1886 | Cambuslang | 6–1 | Motherwell | Cambuslang |
| | | | | Stadium: Whitefield Park |

| 11 September 1886 | Shettleston | 3–3 | Carfin Shamrock | Glasgow |
| | | | | Stadium: Greenhouse Park |

| Hamilton Academical | w/o | Wishaw Swifts |

==== Perthshire district ====
Caledonian Rangers and Moffat received a bye to the second round.

| 11 September 1886 | St Johnstone | 3–3 | Erin Rovers | Perth |
| | | | | Stadium: Recreation Grounds |

| 11 September 1886 | Dunblane | 12–0 | Crieff | Dunblane |
| | | | | Stadium: Kippenross Park |

| Coupar Angus | w/o | Fair City Athletic |

| Oban | w/o | Blairgowrie Our Boys |

==== Northern Counties ====
| 11 September 1886 | Strathmore (Arbroath) | 3–0 | Strathmore (Dundee) | Arbroath |
| | | | | Stadium: Damley Park |

| 11 September 1886 | Lindertis | 3–4 | Dundee Harp | Kirriemuir |
| | | | | Stadium: Knowehead |

| 11 September 1886 | Arbroath | 20–0 | Orion | Arbroath |
| | | | | Stadium: Gayfield Park |

| 11 September 1886 | Wanderers | 2–7 | Broughty | Dundee |
| | | | | Stadium: Morgan Park |

| 18 September 1886 | Dundee Our Boys | 2–5 | Forfar Athletic | Dundee |
| | | | | Stadium: West Craigie Park |

| Aberdeen | w/o | Dundee East End |

==== Southern Counties ====
Moffat received a bye to the second round.

| Queen of the South Wanderers | w/o | Nithsdale |

| Vale of Nith | w/o | Vale of Annan |

| 5th Kirkcudbrightshire RV | w/o | Thornhill |

=== Replays ===
==== Glasgow and District ====
| 25 September 1886 | St Andrew's | 4–1 | Pollokshields Athletic | Pollokshields |
| | | | | Stadium: Lorne Park |

==== Renfrewshire district ====
| 18 September 1886 | Abercorn | 9–0 | Renfrew | Paisley |

==== Edinburghshire district ====
| 18 September 1886 | Broxburn Thistle | 4–1 | Bellstane Birds | Broxburn |
| | | | | Stadium: Sports Park |

==== Stirlingshire district ====
| 18 September 1886 | Vale of Bannock | 2–0 | Longcroft Thistle | Bannockburn |
| | | | | Stadium: Muir Park |

==== Lanarkshire district ====
| 18 September 1886 | Carfin Shamrock | 3–0 | Shettleston | Carfin |
| | | | | Stadium: Byres Knowe Park |

==== Perthshire district ====
| 18 September 1886 | Erin Rovers | 7–1 | St Johnstone | Perth |
| | | | | Stadium: St Catherine's Park |

Notes

1. A-A protest by St Andrew's was upheld and a replay was ordered.
2. B-Greenock Rangers were awarded the tie after 1st Renfrew RV fielded two non-registered players.
3. C-Originally due to be played on 11 September, the match was postponed due to inclement weather and St Mirren and Arthurlie instead played a friendly.
4. D-Match abandoned after 75 minutes after Duntocher gave up.
5. E-Jamestown were awarded the tie after Vale of Leven Wanderers fielded a non-registered player.
6. F-Tollcross were awarded the tie after Royal Albert fielded a non-registered player.

== Second round ==
=== Matches ===
==== Glasgow and District ====
| 2 October 1886 | Rangers | 5–2 | Westbourne | Kinning Park |
| | McKenzie; Buchanan; Duncan; Pringle | | | Stadium: Kinning Park; Attendance: 600 |

| 2 October 1886 | Linthouse | 1–4 | 3rd Lanark RV | Govan |
| | | | | Stadium: Langlands Road |

| 2 October 1886 | Thistle | 12–0 | St Andrew's | Glasgow |
| | | | | Stadium: Beechwood Park |

| 2 October 1886 | Queen's Park | 7–0 | Whitefield | Crosshill |
| | | | | Stadium: Hampden Park |

| 2 October 1886 | Clyde | 4–3 | Cowlairs | Glasgow |
| | | | | Stadium: Barrowfield Park |

==== Edinburghshire district ====
St Bernard's received a bye to the third round.

| 2 October 1886 | Broxburn Thistle | 1–2 | Heart of Midlothian | Broxburn |
| | | | | Stadium: Sports Field |

| 2 October 1886 | Newcastleton | 1–5 | Armadale | Newcastleton |
| | | | | Stadium: Liddel View Park |

| 2 October 1886 | Mossend Swifts | 1–1 | Hibernian | West Calder |
| | | | McGhee | Stadium: Mossend Park |

==== Stirlingshire district ====
| 2 October 1886 | Slamannan | 0–3 | Campsie | Slamannan |
| | | | | Stadium: West Limerigg Park |

| 2 October 1886 | Laurieston | 1–3 | Falkirk | Laurieston |
| | | | | Stadium: Zetland Park |

| East Stirlingshire | w/o | Vale of Bannock |

==== Renfrewshire district ====
| 2 October 1886 | Abercorn | 8–2 | Greenock Rangers | Paisley |
| | | | | Stadium: Blackstoun Park |

| 2 October 1886 | Johnstone | 4–0 | Pollokshaws | Johnstone |
| | | | | Stadium: Cartbank Park |

| 2 October 1886 | St Mirren | 2–3 | Port Glasgow Athletic | Paisley |
| | | | Coogan; Brandon (x2) | Stadium: Westmarch; Attendance: 6,000 |

| 2 October 1886 | Thornliebank | 0–2 | Morton | Thornliebank |
| | | | | Stadium: Deacon's Bank Park |

==== Ayrshire district ====
| 2 October 1886 | Lugar Boswell | 3–2 (Void) | Dalry | Lugar |
| | | | | Stadium: Rosebank Park |

| 2 October 1886 | Kilmarnock | 10–2 | Lanemark | Kilmarnock |
| | | | | Stadium: Rugby Park |

| 2 October 1886 | Hurlford | 3–2 | Kilbirnie | Hurlford |
| | | | | Stadium: Corsehill Park |

==== Dunbartonshire district ====
| 2 October 1886 | Renton | 2–0 | Dumbarton Athletic | Renton |
| | | | | Stadium: Tontine Park |

| 2 October 1886 | Lenzie | 0–13 | Vale of Leven | Lenzie |
| | | | | Stadium: Lenzie Football Field |

| 2 October 1886 | Bonhill | 1–2 | Jamestown | Bonhill |
| | | | | Stadium: Croft Loan Park |

| 2 October 1886 | Dumbarton | 4–0 | Yoker | Dumbarton |
| | Jamieson (x2); Brown (x2) | | | Stadium: Boghead Park |

==== Fife district ====
Alloa Athletic received a bye to the third round.

| 2 October 1886 | Burntisland Thistle | 3–3 | Cowdenbeath | Burntisland |
| | | | | Stadium: Lammerlaws Park |

==== Lanarkshire district ====
Tollcross received a bye to the third round.

| 2 October 1886 | Airdrieonians | 3–2 | Carfin Shamrock | Airdrie |
| | | | | Stadium: Mavisbank Park |

| 2 October 1886 | Rutherglen | 1–1 | Cambuslang | Rutherglen |
| | | | | Stadium: Phoenix Park |

| 2 October 1886 | Albion Rovers | 7–0 | Dykehead | Coatbridge |
| | | | | Stadium: Meadow Park |

| 2 October 1886 | Cambuslang Hibernian | 3–1 | Hamilton Academical | Cambuslang |
| | | | | Stadium: Westburn Park |

==== Perthshire district ====
Coupar Angus received a bye to the third round.

| 2 October 1886 | Caledonian Rangers | 4–4 | Erin Rovers | Perth |
| | | | | Stadium: Dovecotland |

| 2 October 1886 | Dunblane | 8–1 | Oban | Dunblane |
| | | | | Stadium: Kippenross Park |

==== Northern Counties ====
| 2 October 1886 | Dundee East End | 5–4 | Broughty | Dundee |
| | | | | Stadium: Pitkerro Park |

| 2 October 1886 | Strathmore (Arbroath) | 3–3 | Dundee Harp | Arbroath |
| | | | | Stadium: Damley Park |

| 2 October 1886 | Forfar Athletic | 2–5 | Arbroath | Forfar |
| | | | | Stadium: Station Park |

==== Southern Counties ====
| 2 October 1886 | Moffat | 3–5 | 5th Kirkcudbrightshire RV | Moffat |
| | | | | Stadium: Ballplay Road |

| 2 October 1886 | Queen of the South Wanderers | 12–2 | Vale of Nith | Dumfries |
| | | | | Stadium: Caledonian Park |

=== Replays ===
==== Edinburghshire district ====
| 9 October 1886 | Hibernian | 3–0 | Mossend Swifts | Edinburgh |
| | Groves; Reynolds; Clarke | | | Stadium: Hibernian Park |

==== Ayrshire district ====
| 16 October 1886 | Lugar Boswell | 6–1 | Dalry | Lugar |
| | | | | Stadium: Rosebank Park |

==== Fife district ====
| 16 October 1886 | Cowdenbeath | 3–1 | Burntisland Thistle | Cowdenbeath |
| | | | | Stadium: Jubilee Park |

==== Lanarkshire district ====
| 9 October 1886 | Cambuslang | 6–1 | Rutherglen | Cambuslang |
| | | | | Stadium: Whitefield Park |

==== Perthshire district ====
| 9 October 1886 | Erin Rovers | 6–1 | Caledonian Rangers | Perth |
| | | | | Stadium: St Catherine's Park |

==== Northern Counties ====
| 9 October 1886 | Dundee Harp | 3–3 | Strathmore (Arbroath) | Dundee |
| | | | | Stadium: East Dock Street |

Notes

1. G-A protest by Dalry was upheld and a replay was ordered after the referee was "held to be incompetent".
2. H-Carfin Shamrock were awarded the tie after Airdrieonians fielded a non-registered player.
3. I-Both teams qualified for the second round.

== Third round ==
=== Matches ===
==== Glasgow, Dunbartonshire, Stirlingshire and Lanarkshire district ====
Carfin Shamrock received a bye to the fourth round.

| 23 October 1886 | Cambuslang Hibernian | 5–1 | Jamestown | Cambuslang |
| | | | | Stadium: Westburn Park |

| 23 October 1886 | East Stirlingshire | 1–3 | Clyde | Falkirk |
| | | | | Stadium: Randyford Park |

| 23 October 1886 | Falkirk | 3–8 | Queen's Park | Falkirk |
| | | | | Stadium: Brockville Park |

| 23 October 1886 | 3rd Lanark RV | 3–1 | Renton | Crosshill |
| | | | | Stadium: Cathkin Park |

| 23 October 1886 | Vale of Leven | 7–4 | Campsie | Alexandria |
| | | | | Stadium: North Street Park |

| 23 October 1886 | Rangers | 0–2 | Cambuslang | Kinning Park |
| | | | | Stadium: Kinning Park; Attendance: 4,000 |

| 23 October 1886 | Albion Rovers | 4–2 | Thistle | Coatbridge |
| | | | | Stadium: Meadow Park |

| Dumbarton | w/o | Tollcross |

==== Edinburghshire and Fife district ====
| 23 October 1886 | St Bernard's | 5–2 | Armadale | Edinburgh |
| | | | | Stadium: Powderhall |

| 23 October 1886 | Hibernian | 5–1 | Heart of Midlothian | Edinburgh |
| | McGinn; McLaren; Groves; Reynolds; Clarke | | | Stadium: Hibernian Park; Attendance: 7,000 |

| 23 October 1886 | Cowdenbeath | 6–1 | Alloa Athletic | Cowdenbeath |
| | | | | Stadium: Jubilee Park |

==== Renfrewshire and Ayrshire district ====
Morton received a bye to the fourth round.

| 23 October 1886 | Johnstone | 0–5 | Hurlford | Johnstone |
| | | | | Stadium: Cartbank Park |

| 23 October 1886 | Abercorn | 1–5 | Port Glasgow Athletic | Paisley |
| | | | Coogan | Stadium: Blackstoun Park; Attendance: 5,500 |

| 23 October 1886 | Kilmarnock | 7–2 | Lugar Boswell | Kilmarnock |
| | | | | Stadium: Rugby Park; Attendance: 2,000 |

==== Perthshire and Northern Counties ====
Arbroath received a bye to the fourth round.

| 23 October 1886 | Erin Rovers | 3–2 | Coupar Angus | Perth |
| | | | | Stadium: St Catherine's Park |

| 23 October 1886 | Dundee East End | 3–3 | Dunblane | Dundee |
| | | | | Stadium: Pitkerro Park |

| 23 October 1886 | Strathmore (Arbroath) | 1–8 | Dundee Harp | Arbroath |
| | | | | Stadium: Damley Park |

==== Southern Counties ====
| 23 October 1886 | Queen of the South Wanderers | 6–3 | 5th Kirkcudbrightshire RV | Dumfries |
| | | | | Stadium: Caledonian Park |

=== Replay ===
==== Perthshire and Northern Counties ====
| Dundee East End | w/o | Dunblane |

== Fourth round ==
On the motion of Mr McCulloch of Dundee Harp, the Scottish FA decided to ensure that the fourth round would be the last round requiring byes and that there would be only five ties, all involving one of the five clubs that had received byes thus far. Consequently, Clyde, Dumbarton, Dunblane, Dundee Harp, Hibernian, Hurlford, Kilmarnock, Port Glasgow Athletic, Queen's Park, Vale of Leven and 3rd Lanark RV all received a bye to the fifth round.

=== Matches ===
| 6 November 1886 | Morton | 11–0 | Carfin Shamrock | Greenock |
| | | | | Stadium: Cappielow |

| 13 November 1886 | Albion Rovers | 1–6 | Cambuslang | Coatbridge |
| | | | | Stadium: Meadow Park |

| 13 November 1886 | Queen of the South Wanderers | 8–2 | Arbroath | Dumfries |
| | | | | Stadium: Caledonian Park |

| 13 November 1886 | St Bernard's | 5–1 | Erin Rovers | Edinburgh |
| | | | | Stadium: Powderhall |

| 13 November 1886 | Cowdenbeath | 0–3 | Cambuslang Hibernian | Cowdenbeath |
| | | | | Stadium: Jubilee Park |

== Fifth round ==
=== Matches ===
| 27 November 1886 | Vale of Leven | 2–0 | Cambuslang Hibernian | Alexandria |
| | | | | Stadium: North Street Park |

| 4 December 1886 | Hibernian | 7–3 | Queen of the South Wanderers | Edinburgh |
| | McGhee (x2); Groves (x2); Reynolds; Smith (x2) | | | Stadium: Hibernian Park |

| 4 December 1886 | Clyde | 0–0 | 3rd Lanark RV | Glasgow |
| | | | | Stadium: Barrowfield Park |

| 4 December 1886 | Queen's Park | 1–1 | Cambuslang | Crosshill |
| | | | | Stadium: Hampden Park |

| 4 December 1886 | Hurlford | 5–1 | Morton | Hurlford |
| | | | | Stadium: Corsehill Park |

| 4 December 1886 | Kilmarnock | 6–0 | Dunblane | Kilmarnock |
| | | | | Stadium: Rugby Park; Attendance: 2,000 |

| 4 December 1886 | Port Glasgow Athletic | 6–2 | St Bernard's | Port Glasgow |
| | Graham; Coogan (x2) | | | Stadium: Clune Park; Attendance: 4,000 |

| Dumbarton | w/o | Dundee Harp |

=== Replays ===
| 11 December 1886 | 3rd Lanark RV | 4–2 | Clyde | Crosshill |
| | | | | Stadium: Cathkin Park |

| 11 December 1886 | Cambuslang | 4–5 | Queen's Park | Cambuslang |
| | | | | Stadium: Westburn Park |

Notes

1. J-As Dundee Harp could not afford to make the trip to Dumbarton, the club scratched from the competition, and invited Dumbarton to East End Park to play a friendly instead, which ended 2–2. However, Harp advertised the match as a Cup tie and many media outlets reported it as such.

== Quarter-finals ==
=== Matches ===
| 25 December 1886 | Port Glasgow Athletic | 1–3 | Vale of Leven | Port Glasgow |
| | Brandon | | | Stadium: Clune Park |

| 25 December 1886 | Kilmarnock | 0–5 | Queen's Park | Kilmarnock |
| | | | | Stadium: Rugby Park; Attendance: 2,500 |

| 25 December 1886 | 3rd Lanark RV | 1–2 | Hibernian | Crosshill |
| | | | Reynolds; Clarke | Stadium: Cathkin Park; Attendance: 5,000 |

| 25 December 1886 | Hurlford | 0–0 | Dumbarton | Hurlford |
| | | | | Stadium: Corsehill Park |

=== Replay ===
| 8 January 1887 | Dumbarton | 1–2 (Void) | Hurlford | Dumbarton |
| | | | | Stadium: Boghead Park |

=== Second replay ===
| 22 January 1887 | Dumbarton | 3–1 | Hurlford | Dumbarton |
| | Jamieson; Madden; Keir | | | Stadium: Boghead Park; Attendance: 2,000 |

Notes

1. K-A protest by Dumbarton was upheld and a replay was ordered.

== Semi-finals ==
=== Matches ===
| 22 January 1887 | Hibernian | 3–1 | Vale of Leven | Edinburgh |
| | Montgomery; Groves (x2) | | | Stadium: Hibernian Park; Attendance: 6,000 |

| 29 January 1887 | Queen's Park | 1–2 | Dumbarton | Crosshill |
| | | | Robertson (x2) | Stadium: Hampden Park; Attendance: 3,000 |

== Final ==
12 February 1887
15:00

| Hibernian | 2–1 | Dumbarton |
|---|---|---|
| Montgomery; Groves | | Aitken |

Hampden Park, Crosshill
Attendance: 15,000
