= Bonhill F.C. =

Association football club in Dunbartonshire, Scotland

Bonhill
- Full name: Bonhill Football Club
- Nickname(s): the Toughs
- Founded: 1885
- Dissolved: 1888
- Ground: Croft Loan Park
- Hon. President: Ellis Jones
- President: Archibald Wilson
- Match secretary: Martin Moran
Home colours

Bonhill Football Club was an association football club based in the town of Bonhill, in Dunbartonshire.

== History ==
The club was founded in 1885, and, having quickly leased a ground, entered the Scottish Cup. The club's first match in the competition was a 1–1 draw at Lenzie in the September 1885, but winning 6–0 in the replay. In the second round the club lost 10–0 at Vale of Leven.

The national cup being drawn on a regional basis in the early rounds meant that the club only ever faced local sides; with the county being the strongest for football, that doomed the club to early exits in its remaining entries. In the 1886–87 Scottish Cup the club beat Kirkintilloch Central 8–1 away in the first round, but lost at home to Jamestown in the second, somewhat against expectations, as Bonhill had won 5 out of 6 games thus far in the season, but the club could not turn around a 2–0 half-time deficit.

The club's final Scottish Cup entry, in 1887–88, ended in the first round, with a 6–1 home defeat to Dumbarton Athletic; Bonhill took the lead after six minutes, with Bruce forcing the ball home from a scrimmage, but Bonhill only held the lead for three minutes, went behind in the 38th, and collapsed in the second half.

Bonhill faced a similar problem as it did in the Scottish Cup in the Dumbartonshire Cup, and only ever won one match in the competition (2–1 at Kirkintilloch Athletic in 1887–88). With three of the strongest sides in the world as near neighbours (Vale of Leven, Renton, and Dumbarton), the club was defunct by early 1889, the last recorded game being a defeat at home to Kirkintilloch Central in February 1888.

== Colours ==
The club's colours were light blue shirts and white knickerbockers.

== Ground ==
The club played at a park which ran alongside Croft Loan, leased from Mr Shanks of Ladyton.
