= 1887–88 Scottish Cup =

Scottish Cup
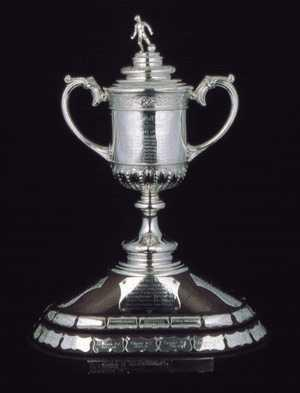
- The Scottish Cup trophy

Tournament details
- Country: Scotland
- Teams: 145

Final positions
- Champions: Renton (second title)
- Runners-up: Cambuslang

Tournament statistics
- Matches played: 158
- Goals scored: 1,026 (6.49 per match)

The 1887–88 Scottish Cup was the 15th season of Scotland's most prestigious football knockout competition. Renton won the competition for the second time after they beat Cambuslang 6–1 in the final. The result set a new record as the largest margin of victory in a Scottish Cup Final - a record that was equalled by Celtic in 1972 but has never been bettered.

== Calendar ==
Round	First match date	Fixtures			Clubs
Round	First match date	Original	Byes	Replays	Clubs
First Round	27 August 1887	70	5	6	145 → 75
Second Round	24 September 1887	34	6	5	75 → 42
Third Round	15 October 1887	20	2	4	42 → 22
Fourth Round	5 November 1887	6	10	4	22 → 16
Fifth Round	26 November 1887	8	0	0	16 → 8
Quarter-finals	17 December 1887	4	0	1	8 → 4
Semi-finals	14 January 1888	2	0	1	4 → 2
Final	4 February 1888	1	0	0	2 → 1

== Teams ==
All 145 teams entered the competition in the first round.

Dunbartonshire	Edinburghshire	Glasgow and Suburbs	Lanarkshire	Northern Counties	Renfrewshire
Bonhill; Dumbarton; Dumbarton Athletic; Dumbarton Union; Dunbritton; Jamestown; Kirkintilloch Athletic; Kirkintilloch Central; Kirkintilloch Harp; Methlan Park; Renton; Vale of Leven; Vale of Leven Hibernians; Vale of Leven Wanderers	Armadale; Athenian; Bellstane Birds; Bo'ness; Broxburn Shamrock; Broxburn Thistle; Erin Rovers (Bathgate); Heart of Midlothian; Hibernian; Leith Athletic; Mossend Swifts; Norton Park; St Bernard's; West Calder	Battlefield; Carrick; Clyde; Cowlairs; Kelvinside Athletic; Glasgow University; Govan Athletic; Linthouse; Northern; Partick Thistle; Pollokshields Athletic; Queen's Park; Rangers; St Andrew's; Shettleston; Southern Athletic; Thistle; United Abstainers; Westbourne; Whitefield; 3rd Lanark RV	Airdriehill; Airdrieonians; Albion Rovers; Cambuslang; Cambuslang Hibernian; Carfin Shamrock; Clydesdale; Drumpellier; Dykehead; Hamilton Academical; Hamilton Hibernian; Motherwell; Plains; Royal Albert; Rutherglen; Tollcross; Uddingston	Aberdeen; Aberdeen Rovers; Arbroath; Broughty; Dundee East End; Dundee Harp; Forfar Athletic; Lindertis; Lochee; Montrose; Orion; Our Boys (Dundee); Strathmore (Arbroath); Strathmore (Dundee); Wanderers	Abercorn; Arthurlie; Dykebar; Greenock Rangers; Johnstone Harp; Kilbarchan; Lochwinnoch; Morton; Neilston; Paisley Athletic; Pollokshaws; Port Glasgow Athletic; Renfrew; St Mirren; Thornliebank; 1st Renfrew RV
Argyll	Ayrshire	Fife	Perthshire	Southern Counties	Stirlingshire
Lochgilphead; Oban	Annbank; Ayr; Ayr Thistle; Dalry; Hurlford; Kilbirnie; Kilmarnock; Lanemark; Lugar Boswell; Mauchline; Maybole; Monkcastle; 2nd Ayrshire RV	Alloa Athletic; Burntisland Thistle; Cowdenbeath; Dunfermline; Dunfermline Athletic; Lassodie	Caledonian Rangers; Coupar Angus; Crieff; Dunblane; Erin Rovers (Perth); Fair City Athletic; Our Boys (Blairgowrie); St Johnstone	Moffat; Newcastleton; Nithsdale; Queen of the South Wanderers; Thornhill; Vale o' Nith; 5th Kirkcudbrightshire RV	Camelon; Campsie; East Stirlingshire; Falkirk; Grahamston; Grangemouth; Kilsyth Wanderers; King's Park; Laurieston; Redding Athletic; Slamannan; Vale of Bannock

Notes

1. A-Shettleston were included in Lanarkshire district for the first round but, following an appeal, they were reinstated in the second round as part of Glasgow and Suburbs.

== First round ==
=== Matches ===
==== Glasgow and Suburbs ====
Glasgow University and Southern Athletic received a bye to the second round.

3 September 1887	Partick Thistle	10–0	Westbourne	Partick
				Stadium: Inchview

3 September 1887	Pollokshields Athletic	4–1	United Abstainers	Pollokshields
				Stadium: Pollok Park

3 September 1887	Rangers	4–1	Battlefield	Govan
	Lawrie; White (x2); Brand			Stadium: Ibrox Park; Attendance: 3,500

3 September 1887	Kelvinside Athletic	6–3	St Andrew's	Glasgow
				Stadium: Kelburne Street

3 September 1887	Northern	5–1	Govan Athletic	Glasgow
				Stadium: Hyde Park

3 September 1887	Linthouse	3–3	Whitefield	Govan
				Stadium: Langlands Park

3 September 1887	3rd Lanark RV	1–2 (Void)	Cowlairs	Crosshill
				Stadium: Cathkin Park

3 September 1887	Clyde	0–7	Queen's Park	Glasgow
				Stadium: Barrowfield Park; Attendance: 5,000

3 September 1887	Carrick	0–10	Thistle	Possilpark
				Stadium: Saracen Park

==== Renfrewshire district ====
27 August 1887	Port Glasgow Athletic	11–0	Greenock Rangers	Port Glasgow
	McMillan (x3); McLaren; Neil			Stadium: Clune Park

3 September 1887	Lochwinnoch	5–1	Pollokshaws	Lochwinnoch
				Stadium: Field Park

3 September 1887	Kilbarchan	0–4	Arthurlie	Kilbarchan
				Stadium: Whitlands

3 September 1887	Dykebar	5–2	Morton	Paisley
				Stadium: Thistle Park

3 September 1887	1st Renfrew RV	1–8	Renfrew	Greenock
				Stadium: Academy Park

3 September 1887	Abercorn	9–0	Johnstone Harp	Paisley
				Stadium: Blackstoun Park

3 September 1887	Thornliebank	1–2	St Mirren	Thornliebank
				Stadium: Deacon's Bank Park

Paisley Athletic	w/o	Neilston

==== Edinburghshire district ====
3 September 1887	Hibernian	5–0	Broxburn Thistle	Edinburgh
	McLaren; Smith; McGhee; Dunbar; Clarke			Stadium: Hibernian Park

3 September 1887	Erin Rovers (Bathgate)	5–0	Bellstane Birds	Bathgate
				Stadium: Boghead Park

3 September 1887	Broxburn Shamrock	0–4	Mossend Swifts	Broxburn
				Stadium: Shamrock Park

3 September 1887	West Calder	9–0	Athenian	West Calder
				Stadium: Burngrange Park

3 September 1887	Heart of Midlothian	4–1	Norton Park	Edinburgh
	Patterson; Carruthers; MacKay; Jenkinson			Stadium: Tynecastle Park

3 September 1887	Bo'ness	4–1	Leith Athletic	Bo'ness
				Stadium: Newtown Park

3 September 1887	St Bernard's	3–2	Armadale	Edinburgh
				Stadium: Powderhall

==== Ayrshire district ====
Mauchline received a bye to the second round.

3 September 1887	Maybole	3–3	2nd Ayrshire RV	Maybole
				Stadium: Gardenrose Farm

3 September 1887	Lugar Boswell	9–0	Dalry	Lugar
				Stadium: Rosebank Park

3 September 1887	Kilmarnock	8–2	Ayr Thistle	Kilmarnock
	Taylor (x2); McPherson (x2)			Stadium: Rugby Park

Ayr	w/o	Monkcastle

Hurlford	w/o	Annbank

Kilbirnie	w/o	Lanemark

==== Dunbartonshire district ====
1 September 1887	Dumbarton	10–0	Dunbritton	Dumbarton
				Stadium: Boghead Park; Attendance: 3,500

3 September 1887	Jamestown	3–2 (Void)	Vale of Leven Hibernians	Jamestown
				Stadium: Balloch Road

3 September 1887	Dumbarton Union	0–6	Renton	Dumbarton
				Stadium: Woodyard Park

3 September 1887	Bonhill	1–6	Dumbarton Athletic	Bonhill
				Stadium: Croft Loan

3 September 1887	Kirkintilloch Athletic	5–1	Kirkintilloch Central	Kirkintilloch
				Stadium: Townhead Park

3 September 1887	Vale of Leven Wanderers	7–2	Methlan Park	Alexandria
				Stadium: Balloch Road

Vale of Leven	w/o	Kirkintilloch Harp

==== Lanarkshire district ====
3 September 1887	Cambuslang Hibernian	6–4	Hamilton Hibernian	Cambuslang
				Stadium: Westburn Park

3 September 1887	Albion Rovers	12–0	Airdriehill	Coatbridge
				Stadium: Meadow Park

3 September 1887	Rutherglen	4–1	Clydesdale	Rutherglen
				Stadium: Phoenix Park

3 September 1887	Carfin Shamrock	4–0	Shettleston	Carfin
				Stadium: Byres Knowe Park

3 September 1887	Uddingston	2–5	Royal Albert	Uddingston
				Stadium: Meadowbank

3 September 1887	Drumpellier	2–3	Motherwell	Coatbridge
				Stadium: Blair Lodge Park

3 September 1887	Airdrieonians	8–0	Dykehead	Airdrie
				Stadium: Mavisbank Park

Plains	w/o	Tollcross

Hamilton Academical	w/o	Cambuslang

==== Stirlingshire district ====
3 September 1887	Falkirk	4–1	Kilsyth Wanderers	Falkirk
				Stadium: Brockville Park

3 September 1887	King's Park	1–5	Camelon	Stirling
				Stadium: Forthbank Park

3 September 1887	Grahamston	4–3	Redding Athletic	Grahamston

3 September 1887	Grangemouth	2–5	East Stirlingshire	Grangemouth
				Stadium: Muirhead Park

3 September 1887	Vale of Bannock	3–4	Campsie	Bannockburn
				Stadium: Muir Park

3 September 1887	Slamannan	5–4	Laurieston	Slamannan
				Stadium: West Limerigg Park

==== Fife district ====
3 September 1887	Alloa Athletic	6–2	Cowdenbeath	Alloa
				Stadium: Gaberston Park; Attendance: 1,000

3 September 1887	Burntisland Thistle	4–2	Dunfermline Athletic	Burntisland
				Stadium: Lammerslaw Park

3 September 1887	Dunfermline	3–2	Lassodie	Dunfermline
				Stadium: Ladysmill

==== Northern Counties ====
Aberdeen Rovers received a bye to the second round.

3 September 1887	Strathmore (Dundee)	6–3	Forfar Athletic	Dundee
				Stadium: Logie Park

3 September 1887	Wanderers	7–0	Lochee	Dundee
				Stadium: Morgan Park

3 September 1887	Broughty	5–7	Montrose	Broughty Ferry
				Stadium: Forthill Park

3 September 1887	Strathmore (Arbroath)	1–13	Dundee East End	Arbroath
				Stadium: Damley Park

3 September 1887	Lindertis	1–2	Dundee Harp	Kirriemuir
				Stadium: Knowehead

3 September 1887	Arbroath	18–0	Orion	Arbroath
				Stadium: Gayfield Park

3 September 1887	Aberdeen	4–9	Dundee Our Boys	Aberdeen
				Stadium: Recreation Grounds

==== Perthshire district ====
3 September 1887	Erin Rovers (Perth)	3–9	St Johnstone	Perth
				Stadium: St Catherine's Park

3 September 1887	Caledonian Rangers	1–7	Crieff	Perth
				Stadium: Dovecotland

3 September 1887	Dunblane	2–3	Fair City Athletic	Dunblane
				Stadium: Duckburn Park

3 September 1887	Coupar Angus	9–2	Blairgowrie Our Boys	Coupar Angus
				Stadium: Station Park

==== Argyll district ====
3 September 1887	Lochgilphead	1–9	Oban	Lochgilphead
				Stadium: Bank Park

==== Southern Counties ====
Nithsdale received a bye to the second round.

3 September 1887	Queen of the South Wanderers	6–0	Vale of Nith	Dumfries
				Stadium: Cresswell Park

3 September 1887	Moffat	7–1	Newcastleton	Moffat
				Stadium: Ballplay Road

3 September 1887	5th Kirkcudbrightshire RV	5–0	Thornhill	Dumfries
				Stadium: Palmerston Park

=== Replays ===
==== Glasgow and Suburbs ====
10 September 1887	Whitefield	2–1	Linthouse	Govan
				Stadium: Whitefield Park

17 September 1887	3rd Lanark RV	1–4	Cowlairs	Crosshill
				Stadium: Cathkin Park

==== Ayrshire district ====
10 September 1887	2nd Ayrshire RV	4–6	Maybole	Newmilns
				Stadium: Hillhead Park

==== Dunbartonshire district ====
17 September 1887	Vale of Leven Hibernians	2–2	Jamestown	Alexandria
				Stadium: Hill Street

=== Second replay ===
==== Dunbartonshire district ====
24 September 1887	Jamestown	3–1	Vale of Leven Hibernians	Jamestown
				Stadium: Balloch Road

Notes

1. B-A protest by 3rd Lanark RV that Calderwood of Cowlairs was guilty of professionalism was upheld. Calderwood was banned from football for two years and a replay was ordered.
2. C-Burntisland Thistle, Dundee Harp, Dunfermline, Grahamston and Mossend Swifts were disqualified for non-registration of players and Broxburn Shamrock, Lindertis, Lassodie, Redding Athletic and Dunfermline Athletic were subsequently re-instated.
3. D-A protest by Vale of Leven Hibernians was upheld and a replay was ordered.
4. E-A protest by Shettleston that they had wrongly been included in the Lanarkshire district rather than in Glasgow and Suburbs as their ground was within the municipal counties of Glasgow was upheld. They were reinstated in the second round in Glasgow and Suburbs.

== Second round ==
=== Matches ===
==== Glasgow and Suburbs ====
24 September 1887	Cowlairs	9–1	Southern Athletic	Glasgow
				Stadium: Gourlay Park

24 September 1887	Partick Thistle	2–1	Rangers	Partick
			Brand	Stadium: Inchview; Attendance: 5,000

24 September 1887	Queen's Park	9–0	Kelvinside Athletic	Crosshill
				Stadium: Hampden Park

24 September 1887	Thistle	6–0	Glasgow University	Glasgow
				Stadium: Beechwood Park

24 September 1887	Whitefield	2–0	Pollokshields Athletic	Govan
				Stadium: Whitefield Park

24 September 1887	Northern	6–3	Shettleston	Glasgow
				Stadium: Hyde Park

==== Renfrewshire district ====
24 September 1887	Abercorn	6–0	Neilston	Paisley
				Stadium: Blackstoun Park

24 September 1887	Arthurlie	3–3	St Mirren	Barrhead
				Stadium: Dunterlie Park; Attendance: 4,000

24 September 1887	Lochwinnoch	2–5	Dykebar	Lochwinnoch
				Stadium: Field Park

24 September 1887	Renfrew	3–3	Port Glasgow Athletic	Renfrew
			Graham; McMillan; Hunter	Stadium: Glebe Street

==== Edinburghshire district ====
Heart of Midlothian received a bye to the third round.

24 September 1887	Erin Rovers (Bathgate)	0–6	Hibernian	Bathgate
			Smith; Groves (x2); 1 own goal: Clarke (x2)	Stadium: Dedethill; Attendance: 1,000

24 September 1887	Bo'ness	5–1	West Calder	Bo'ness
				Stadium: Newtown Park

24 September 1887	St Bernard's	1–1	Broxburn Shamrock	Edinburgh
				Stadium: Powderhall

==== Dunbartonshire district ====
Vale of Leven Wanderers received a bye to the third round.

24 September 1887	Dumbarton	1–5	Vale of Leven	Dumbarton
	Aitken		McLaren; Cowan	Stadium: Boghead Park

24 September 1887	Renton	4–2	Dumbarton Athletic	Renton
				Stadium: Tontine Park

1 October 1887	Jamestown	7–1	Kirkintilloch Athletic	Jamestown
				Stadium: Balloch Road

==== Ayrshire district ====
Kilmarnock received a bye to the third round.

24 September 1887	Kilbirnie	3–0	Mauchline	Kilbirnie
				Stadium: Milton Park

24 September 1887	Maybole	0–13	Ayr	Maybole
				Stadium: Gardenrose Farm

24 September 1887	Hurlford	9–1	Lugar Boswell	Hurlford
				Stadium: Corsehill Park

==== Lanarkshire district ====
Plains received a bye to the third round.

24 September 1887	Carfin Shamrock	3–1	Motherwell	Carfin
				Stadium: Byreknowes Park

24 September 1887	Rutherglen	3–6	Albion Rovers	Rutherglen
				Stadium: Lochgair Park

24 September 1887	Cambuslang	2–0	Royal Albert	Cambuslang
				Stadium: Westburn Park

24 September 1887	Airdrieonians	3–0	Cambuslang Hibernian	Airdrie
				Stadium: Mavisbank Park

==== Stirlingshire district ====
24 September 1887	Falkirk	2–2	Campsie	Falkirk
				Stadium: Brockville Park

24 September 1887	Redding Athletic	0–17	Camelon	Redding

24 September 1887	Slamannan	1–6	East Stirlingshire	Slamannan
				Stadium: Barnsmuir

==== Fife district ====
Lassodie received a bye to the third round.

24 September 1887	Alloa Athletic	0–1	Dunfermline Athletic	Alloa
				Stadium: Gaberston Park

==== Northern Counties ====
24 September 1887	Wanderers	10–0	Aberdeen Rovers	Dundee
				Stadium: Morgan Park

24 September 1887	Lindertis	3–2	Dundee East End	Kirriemuir
				Stadium: Knowehead

24 September 1887	Dundee Our Boys	5–3	Montrose	Dundee
				Stadium: West Craigie Park

24 September 1887	Arbroath	3–1	Strathmore (Dundee)	Arbroath
				Stadium: Gayfield Park

==== Perthshire and Argyll district ====
Oban received a bye to the third round.

24 September 1887	Fair City Athletic	3–0	St Johnstone	Perth
				Stadium: Balhousie Park

Coupar Angus	w/o	Crieff

==== Southern Counties ====
24 September 1887	Moffat	4–4	Queen of the South Wanderers	Moffat
				Stadium: Ballplay Road

24 September 1887	Nithsdale	2–9	5th Kirkcudbrightshire RV	Dumfries
				Stadium: Milldamhead

=== Replays ===
==== Renfrewshire district ====
1 October 1887	St Mirren	4–1	Arthurlie	Paisley
	Brown (x3); Scrimmage			Stadium: Westmarch; Attendance: 5,000

1 October 1887	Port Glasgow Athletic	5–3	Renfrew	Port Glasgow
	McFarlane; McMillan (x2); Hunter (x2)			Stadium: Clune Park

==== Edinburghshire district ====
1 October 1887	Broxburn Shamrock	1–4	St Bernard's	Broxburn
				Stadium: Shamrock Park

==== Stirlingshire district ====
1 October 1887	Campsie	2–2	Falkirk	Milton of Campsie
				Stadium: Lennox Park

==== Southern Counties ====
1 October 1887	Queen of the South Wanderers	7–4	Moffat	Dumfries
				Stadium: Cresswell Park

Notes

1. F-Both teams qualified for the third round.

== Third round ==
=== Matches ===
==== Glasgow, Dunbartonshire, Stirlingshire and Lanarkshire district ====
Partick Thistle received a bye to the fourth round.

15 October 1887	Falkirk	2–2	Carfin Shamrock	Falkirk
				Stadium: Brockville Park

15 October 1887	Vale of Leven Wanderers	9–0	Plains	Alexandria
				Stadium: Balloch Road

15 October 1887	Queen's Park	3–0	Jamestown	Crosshill
				Stadium: Hampden Park

15 October 1887	Camelon	0–8	Renton	Camelon
				Stadium: Victoria Park

15 October 1887	Cowlairs	8–1	Campsie	Glasgow
				Stadium: Gourlay Park

15 October 1887	Vale of Leven	3–0	Airdrieonians	Alexandria
				Stadium: North Street Park

15 October 1887	Thistle	2–0	Whitefield	Glasgow
				Stadium: Beechwood Park

15 October 1887	East Stirlingshire	0–0	Cambuslang	Bainsford
				Stadium: Merchiston Park

15 October 1887	Northern	3–4	Albion Rovers	Glasgow
				Stadium: Hyde Park

==== Edinburghshire and Fife district ====
15 October 1887	Heart of Midlothian	1–1	Hibernian	Edinburgh
	Wood		Scrimmage	Stadium: Tynecastle Park; Attendance: 6,000

15 October 1887	Lassodie	1–3	Bo'ness	Lassodie
				Stadium: Green Bank Park

St Bernard's	w/o	Dunfermline Athletic

==== Ayrshire and Renfrewshire ====
15 October 1887	Kilbirnie	1–3	Abercorn	Kilbirnie
				Stadium: Milton Park

15 October 1887	Hurlford	2–4	St Mirren	Hurlford
				Stadium: Corsehill Park

15 October 1887	Ayr	4–0	Port Glasgow Athletic	Ayr
				Stadium: Beresford Park

15 October 1887	Dykebar	2–2	Kilmarnock	Paisley
			Smith; McGuinness	Stadium: Thistle Park; Attendance: 3,000

==== Perthshire and Northern Counties ====
Lindertis received a bye to the fourth round.

15 October 1887	Oban	1–5	Arbroath	Oban
				Stadium: Dalintart Park

15 October 1887	Wanderers	8–0	Coupar Angus	Dundee
				Stadium: Morgan Park

15 October 1887	Fair City Athletic	0–5	Dundee Our Boys	Perth
				Stadium: Balhousie Park

==== Southern Counties ====
15 October 1887	5th Kirkcudbrightshire RV	2–6	Queen of the South Wanderers	Dumfries
				Stadium: Palmerston Park

=== Replays ===
==== Glasgow, Dunbartonshire, Stirlingshire and Lanarkshire district ====
22 October 1887	Carfin Shamrock	3–0	Falkirk	Carfin
				Stadium: Byreknowes Park

22 October 1887	Cambuslang	4–2	East Stirlingshire	Cambuslang
				Stadium: Westburn Park

==== Edinburghshire and Fife district ====
22 October 1887	Hibernian	1–3	Heart of Midlothian	Edinburgh
	Gallagher		Lindsay 17', 90'; Common 49'	Stadium: Hibernian Park; Attendance: 8,500

==== Ayrshire and Renfrewshire district ====
22 October 1887	Kilmarnock	9–1	Dykebar	Kilmarnock
	Taylor (x2); Higgins (x3); McGuinness			Stadium: Rugby Park; Attendance: 3,000

== Fourth round ==
Abercorn, Albion Rovers, Arbroath, Cambuslang, Carfin Shamrock, Cowlairs, Dundee Our Boys, Queen's Park, St Bernard's and Thistle received a bye to the fifth round.

=== Matches ===
5 November 1887	Ayr	3–2	Vale of Leven	Ayr
				Stadium: Beresford Park

5 November 1887	Partick Thistle	2–2	Kilmarnock	Partick
			McPherson (x2)	Stadium: Inchview

5 November 1887	Lindertis	1–13	Renton	Kirriemuir
				Stadium: Knowehead

5 November 1887	Heart of Midlothian	1–1	St Mirren	Edinburgh
	Common 40'		McHardie 83'	Stadium: Tynecastle Park; Attendance: 5,000

5 November 1887	Vale of Leven Wanderers	2–0	Bo'ness	Alexandria
				Stadium: Balloch Road

5 November 1887	Wanderers	4–3	Queen of the South Wanderers	Dundee
				Stadium: Morgan Park

=== Replays ===
12 November 1887	Kilmarnock	1–4	Partick Thistle	Kilmarnock
	McGuinness			Stadium: Rugby Park; Attendance: 5,000

12 November 1887	St Mirren	2–2	Heart of Midlothian	Paisley
	Brandon 30'; Scrimmage 90'		Brackenridge 40'; Jenkinson	Stadium: Westmarch; Attendance: 6,000

=== Second replay ===
19 November 1887	Heart of Midlothian	2–2	St Mirren	Bainsford
	Brackenridge (x2)		Johnstone; Fairlie	Stadium: Merchiston Park; Attendance: 4,000

=== Third replay ===
26 November 1887	Heart of Midlothian	2–4	St Mirren	Glasgow
	Brackenridge (x2)		Brown; Brandon; Scrimmage	Stadium: Cathkin Park; Attendance: 2,000

== Fifth round ==
=== Matches ===
26 November 1887	Dundee Our Boys	4–2	Albion Rovers	Dundee
				Stadium: West Craigie Park

26 November 1887	Partick Thistle	0–2	Queen's Park	Partick
				Stadium: Inchview

26 November 1887	Arbroath	5–1	Cowlairs	Arbroath
				Stadium: Gayfield Park

26 November 1887	Abercorn	9–0	St Bernard's	Paisley
				Stadium: Blackstoun Park

26 November 1887	Cambuslang	10–0	Ayr	Cambuslang
				Stadium: Westburn Park

26 November 1887	Thistle	2–9	Vale of Leven Wanderers	Glasgow
				Stadium: Beechwood Park

26 November 1887	Wanderers	5–2	Carfin Shamrock	Dundee
				Stadium: Morgan Park

3 December 1887	St Mirren	2–3	Renton	Paisley
	Fairlie; Brandon			Stadium: Westmarch; Attendance: 8,000

Notes

1. G-Match abandoned after 85 minutes after Albion Rovers refused to continue playing. The result was allowed to stand

== Quarter-final ==
=== Matches ===
17 December 1887	Abercorn	3–1	Arbroath	Paisley
				Stadium: Blackstoun Park

17 December 1887	Renton	5–1	Wanderers	Renton
				Stadium: Tontine Park

17 December 1887	Cambuslang	6–0	Dundee Our Boys	Cambuslang
				Stadium: Westburn Park

17 December 1887	Queen's Park	7–1	Vale of Leven Wanderers	Crosshill
				Stadium: Hampden Park

== Semi-finals ==
=== Matches ===
14 January 1888	Renton	3–1	Queen's Park	Renton
				Stadium: Tontine Park

14 January 1888	Abercorn	1–1	Cambuslang	Paisley
				Stadium: Blackstoun Park

=== Replay ===
21 January 1888	Cambuslang	10–1	Abercorn	Cambuslang
				Stadium: Whitefield Park

== Final ==
4 February 1888
15:00

Renton	6–1	Cambuslang

Hampden Park, Crosshill
Attendance: 10,000
