= Lenzie F.C. =

Association football club in Dunbartonshire, Scotland

Lenzie
- Full name: Lenzie Football Club
- Founded: 1874
- Dissolved: 1890
- Ground: Lenzie Football Field
- Hon. Secretary: Sydney Broadfoot
Home colours

Lenzie Football Club was an association football club based in the town of Lenzie, in Dunbartonshire.

== History ==
The club was founded in 1874. Its earliest reported match was from the 1875–76 season; a 4–0 win over the "Alert" club (possibly a misprint for Albert) in January, with a hat-trick for Kirkland.

Lenzie entered the Scottish Cup every season from 1876–77 until 1883–84, but with a pronounced lack of success. The club only ever won two Cup ties; the first against Ailsa in 1877–78, and the second by 3–0 at home to Thistle Athletic of Milngavie in 1878–79, with the visitors disputing one of the goals.

Nevertheless, in 1879, the club took part in a demonstration game at the Ulster Cricket Ground against a scratch team of local players in one of the earliest competitive football matches held in Northern Ireland. The club also played a friendly against Cliftonville the same year, and returned to play the same team in 1881.

In 1880–81, the club reached the third round, thanks to the luck of the draw; twice the club was awarded byes. In the third round, Central beat the club 6–1.

The club existed "in name only" from 1883 to 1885, albeit retaining membership of the Scottish Football Association, and there still being "some funds to the credit of the club", which sparked an attempt to revive the side in 1885. The revived club entered the 1885–86 Scottish Cup, drawing 1–1 with Bonhill in the first round, but losing 6–0 in the replay. The club also entered the Dumbartonshire Cup for the only time but withdrew when drawn to face Dumbarton Athletic.

In the 1886–87 Scottish Cup, the withdrawal of first round opponents Dunbritton put the club into the second round, but a 13–0 defeat at home to Vale of Leven persuaded the club to step back from front-level football, and it closed out its career with a match against Chryston Athletic in the 1889–90 season. The name was later taken up by Lenzie Juniors, a Junior side which took the simpler name in 1890.

== Colours ==
The club's colours were white jerseys (with a badge added in 1880) and knickerbockers, and navy blue hose.

== Ground ==
The club played at a ground at Muntin Park, simply known as the Lenzie Football Field, a five-minute walk south from the station, opposite the Convalescent Home (later to become Lenzie Hospital), and later part of a golf course.

After protesting a defeat by Milton of Campsie in the second round of the 1881–82 Scottish Cup, the club had the right to host a re-play, but was unable to use its home ground, so got permission from Thomas Allan, owner of Kincaid House in Milton of Campsie, to host the match on a field near the house, which had formerly been a bowling green.
