= Methlan Park F.C. =

Association football club in Dunbartonshire, Scotland

Methlan Park
- Full name: Methlan Park Football Club
- Founded: 1883
- Dissolved: 1895
- Ground: Woodyard Park
- Patron: Robert McMillan
- Match Secretary: John Mathieson, John L. Muir
- Hon. President: Mr R. Paton
Home colours

Methlan Park Football Club was an association football club based in the town of Dumbarton, in West Dunbartonshire.

== History ==
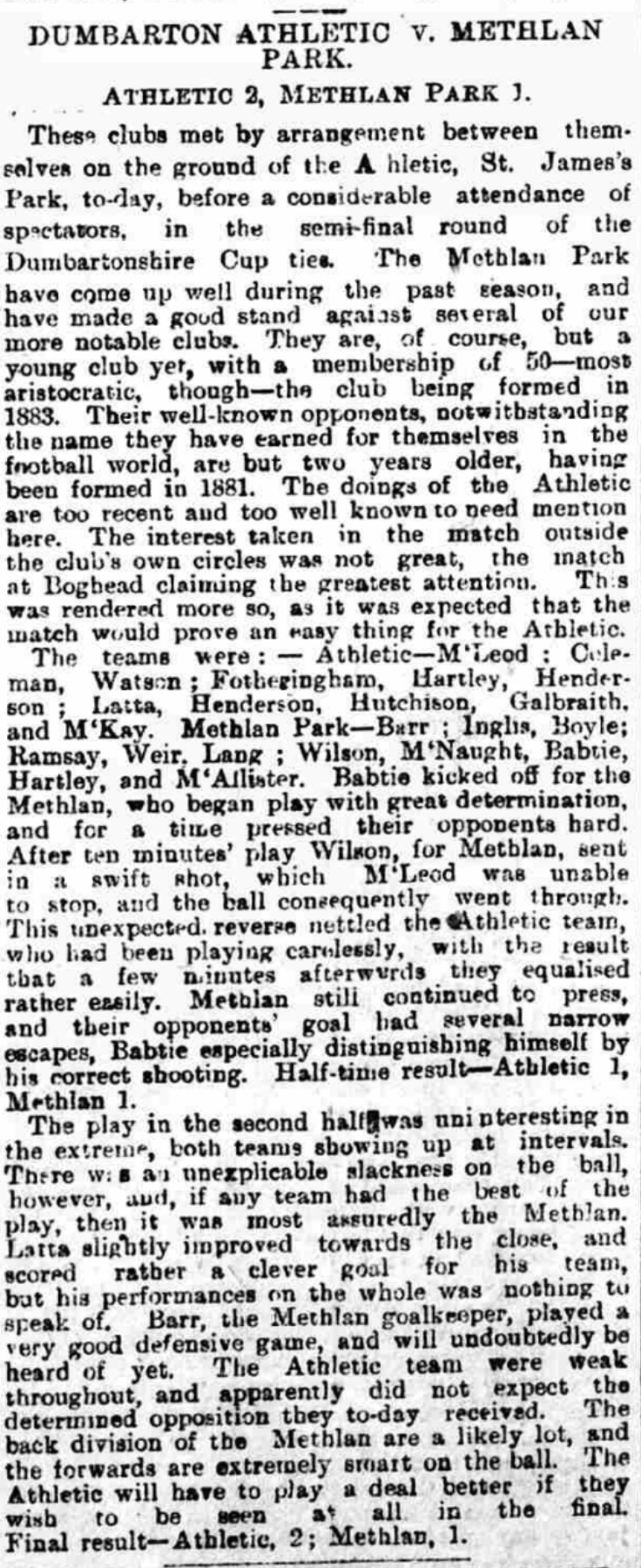
1888–89 Dumbartonshire Cup semi-final, Dumbarton Athletic 2–1 Methlan Park, Glasgow Evening Post, 19 January 1889

The club was formed in 1883 as a somewhat "aristocratic" club, The club may have had links with the Temperance movement as it often held its meetings in the Lennox Temperance Hotel.

The earliest recorded match for the club was at Victoria of Helensburgh in April 1885. Its first competitive match was in the Dumbartonshire Cup at home to Dumbarton Athletic in 1886–87 and ended in a 9–1 defeat, the Methlan goal being almost the last kick of the game.

Undaunted, the club joined the Scottish Football Association in 1887 and entered the Scottish Cup for the first time in 1887–88. Although it suffered heavy defeats in both national and county competitions, the club rapidly improved, and in 1888–89 had its best run in both competitions. In the Scottish Cup, wins over Kirkintilloch Athletic (with three goals in seven minutes) and Vale of Leven Hibernians put the club in the fourth round. The run ended at Dumbarton with a 9–0 defeat, Methlan Park's poor performance being put down to "funk", and Dumbarton deliberately eased off towards the end.

In the Dumbartonshire Cup, Methlan Park registered its biggest competitive win, 8–0 at Kirkintilloch Central in the first round, the game ending eight minutes early when the Central walked off the pitch because of darkness, and only lost 2–1 at Dumbarton Athletic in the semi-final, even taking the lead. It reached the semi-final twice more (in 1889–90 and 1891–92).

Methlan Park's difficulty was that three clubs in the shire - Dumbarton, Vale of Leven, and Renton - were all founder members of the Scottish League, and competing with three clubs backed by local factories was impossible. The club scratched from the qualifying stage of the 1892–93 and 1893–94 Scottish Cup and did not enter the local competition. The club continuing registering with the Scottish FA, but was defunct by April 1895, although the name survived as that of a juvenile side.

== Colours ==
The club played in red and yellow hooped jerseys, with white knickers until 1889 and blue knickers afterwards.

== Ground ==
The club played at Lower Woodyard Park until 1888 and then Upper Woodyard Park, which were a pair of fields next door to Woodyard Park, which had been the home of Alclutha and until 1890 was the home of Union.

The Park had rented both fields during the football season, plus one of them over the summer months for practice, at a rent of £22 per annum, from a John McCallum. McCallum also rented the fields over the summer to a cowfeeder, William Donaldson, who refused to pay the full rent on the basis that he expected both fields over the summer.

== Notable players ==
- Dickie Boyle, a Football League champion with Everton, was the club's vice-captain before joining Dumbarton
- Alex Latta was the club's vice-president in 1888
