= Union F.C. (Dumbarton) =

Association football club in Dunbartonshire, Scotland

Union
- Full name: Union Football Club
- Founded: 1882
- Dissolved: 1894
- Ground: Woodyard Park
- Match Secretary: Angus Brown, Robert Sloan
1882–87 colours	1887–91 colours

Union Football Club was an association football club based in the town of Dumbarton, in West Dunbartonshire.

== History ==
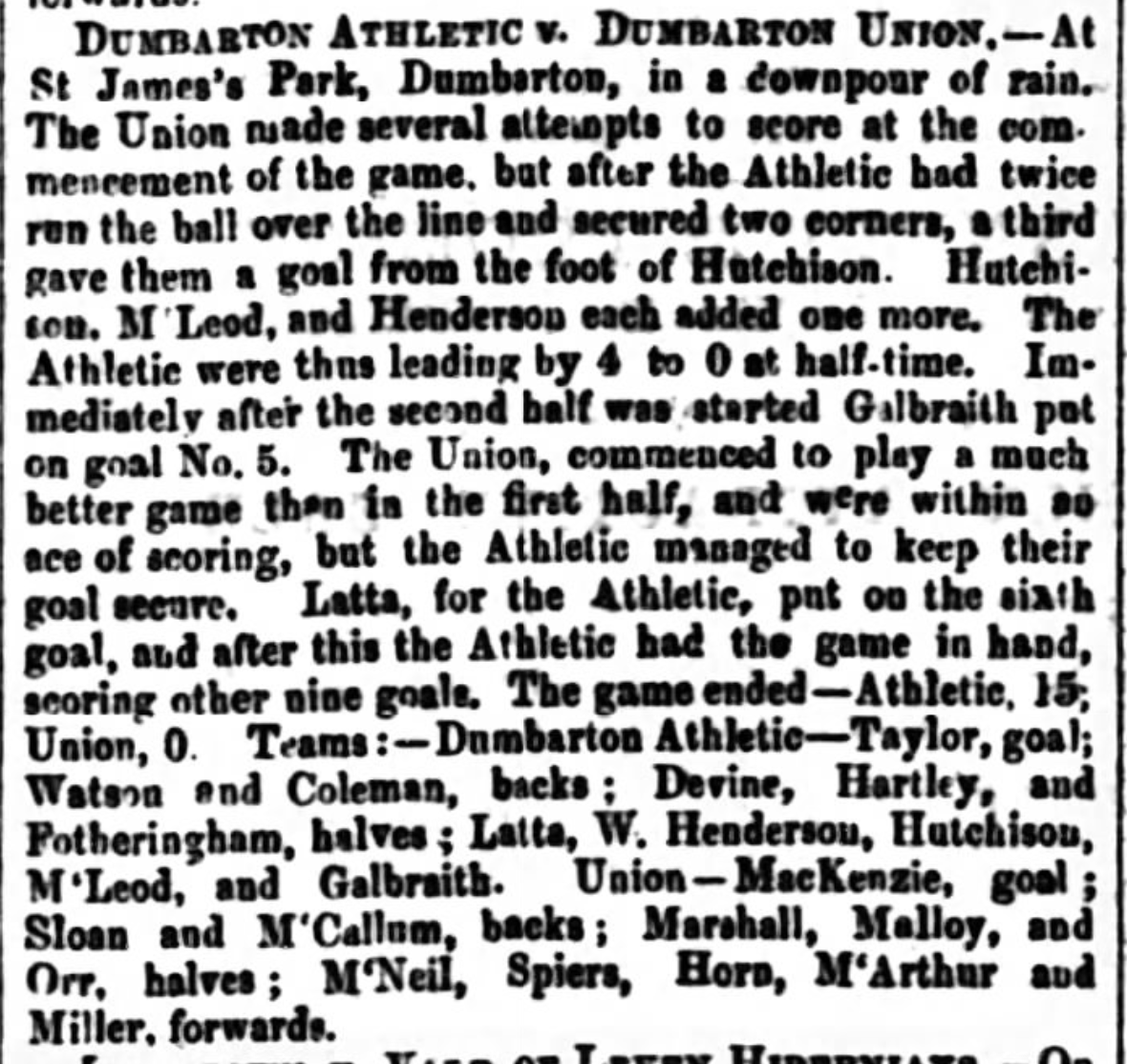
Report of Dumbarton Athletic's 15–0 win over Dumbarton Union, Scottish Cup 1888–89, from the Lennox Herald, 8 September 1888

The club was founded in 1882, and was often referred to as Union (Dumbarton) or Dumbarton Union to avoid confusion with other Union clubs, such as Union (Glasgow).

Given the strength of the three main Dumbartonshire sides (Renton, Vale of Leven, and Dumbarton), as well as other well-established clubs in the area such as Jamestown and the Vale of Leven Wanderers, it was difficult for Union to establish itself. It spent three years playing minor football before joining the Scottish Football Association and being eligible to enter the Scottish Cup in 1885–86.

Its first match in the competition was a 5–1 defeat against Yoker, at the Dalmuir Thistle ground on account of Yoker's temporary homelessness, but, after a protest that the ground was 7 feet too narrow at one end, Union won the replayed tie (at Dumbarton Athletic's Burnside Park) 1–0, much to the surprise of the "friends of the Union", expecting the much heavier Yoker side to win, but taking advantage of Yoker's lack of practice, and enjoying a slice of fortune when a late goal-bound Yoker shot was stopped accidentally by the referee. In the second round it lost 7–0 at Dumbarton.

Yoker gained revenge in the first round in the following season, coming from 2–0 down at half-time to beat Union 4–2, and the worst defeat Union had in the competition came in the first round in 1888–89, losing 15–0 against Dumbarton Athletic.

In the 1889–90 Scottish Cup, by contrast, Union had its best run, reaching the third round, and faced to the strong Cambuslang side. The crowd was much lower than expected as most Dumbarton people went to see the Dumbarton v 3rd L.R.V. taking place in the town on the same day, but St James' Park had an influx of locals as the Dumbarton match finished earlier. Union took a surprise lead at half-time, but Cambuslang equalized with 10 minutes to go. Cambuslang scored what appeared to be the winner with almost the last kick of the game; Union protested that the goal was in the 93rd minute, and the referee had not been entitled to go beyond the 90 minutes. The referee (Mr J. Caldwell) stated that "it was his duty" to extend time, not because of time-wasting, but because a high wind often carried the ball into an adjoining field, and time was wasted in retrieving it; however Cambuslang had not protested about the issue at the time. By a vote of 8–7 the Scottish FA ordered a replay, but it was merely a stay of execution as Cambuslang won through 6–0, thanks in part to scoring three goals between the 60th and 64th minute.

The next year Union recorded its biggest competitive win, 12–1 over Bonnybridge Grasshoppers in the first round, having gone behind; but lost at Bathgate Rovers in the second.

The problems of the Scottish Cup being held in regions for the first rounds, and Dumbartonshire being a footballing hotbed in the era, meant that Union had the same problems in the local competition as in the national. In the Dumbartonshire Cup, the club tended to beat non-SFA members heavily, but struggled against other SFA members. The club's best run in 1886–87 saw it beat Jamestown, Kirkintilloch Central (8–0 away), and Duntocher, to reach the semi-final; however there it faced Vale of Leven and lost 4–0.

The beginning of the Scottish League, which featured the three biggest Dumbartonshire clubs, and the introduction of qualifying rounds to the Scottish Cup, were deleterious to the smaller senior clubs in the area. Union never won through to the first round proper, and scratched from its final entry in 1893–94. The same season, the club entered the Dumbartonshire Cup for the last time, which had shrunk to 8 entrants, and Union did not survive into 1894–95.

== Colours ==
The club's colours were originally navy shirts, white shorts, and blue and white hose. In 1887 the club changed to white jerseys with blue knickers, and in 1891 changed the shirts to blue and white hoops.

== Ground ==
The club originally played at Woodyard Park, the home of Alclutha, with whom the club overlapped for two years, and soon found Methlan Park as neighbours at Upper Woodyard Park. In 1890 the club moved to St James' Park, which had been the ground of Dumbarton Athletic.
