= Kirkintilloch Athletic F.C. =

Association football club in Glasgow City, Scotland

Kirkintilloch Athletic
- Full name: Kirkintilloch Athletic Football Club
- Nicknames: the Athletics, the Spiders
- Founded: 1885
- Dissolved: 1894
- Ground: Townhead Park
Home colours

Kirkintilloch Athletic Football Club was a 19th-century association football club based in Kirkintilloch in Dunbartonshire.

== History ==
The club was formed in 1885, at the start of the cricket season; it was the second club with the name. It quickly joined the Scottish Football Association for the 1885–86 season, and its first match was a 3–1 win over the Livingstone club of Glasgow.

It was, unfortunately, poor preparation for its first Scottish Cup tie, at home to Renton, the Scottish Cup holders and arguably the best team in the world; the visitors duly won 15–0. The local newspaper, perhaps miscounting, or out of kindness, gave the score as 14–0, and stated that the Kirkintilloch side "acquitted themselves fairly well".

The Athletic's problem was starting up as a football team in an area already saturated with clubs, and suffered some heavy beatings in the Cup by more established, and better-backed, sides; 9–0 by Vale of Leven in 1886–87, without even the consolation of the club receiving any gate receipts, as expenses took up the whole of the small gate; 7–1 by Jamestown in 1887–88; 5–0 by Methlan Park in 1888–89, who scored three goals in seven minutes, and 5–2 by Dumbarton Union in 1889–90.

The only win the club had in the Scottish Cup in this period was in 1887–88, beating town rivals Kirkintilloch Central 5–1; a friendly between the two in 1886 had to be abandoned, with the Athletics 3–0 up, after some of the 500 in attendance invaded the pitch in protest at a Central goal being disallowed.

Outside Dumbartonshire, the club looked a little better, only going down to Clydebank by the odd goal in seven in a replay in 1890–91. The Athletics had been handicapped at the start of the season, with regular goalkeeper Buchanan moving to Glasgow Thistle and having to rely on a "good, young" successor in Robert Reid. The club entered the Cup for the next three seasons, after the introduction of qualifying rounds, but never won through to the first round.

The club could find little respite in the local Dumbartonshire Cup. With the bigger teams generally entering, the Athletic could pick off the smaller sides, but struggled against the bigger. The club's best run in the competition came in 1890–91, reaching the semi-final, and to general surprise holding Vale of Leven to a 0–0 draw; however in the replay the Vale scored 12 without reply.

One of the club's best results was a 4–2 win in a friendly with Dumbarton F.C. at the start of the 1889–90 season; it was the first match for Dumbarton after the takeover of Dumbarton Athletic, albeit only one Athletic player had carried over, and he was playing out of position.

A combination of factors in the early 1890s, chiefly the arrival of professionalism and the creation of the Scottish League, drove a number of clubs out of business; the Dumbarton Cup was reduced to 6 entrants by 1894–95. The Athletics' last game in the competition had been in the previous season, and the last reported match a defeat by Dumbarton Rangers in 1893.

== Colours ==
The club originally wore royal blue shirts and white shorts. In 1887 it changed the royal blue to navy blue, and in 1889 the shorts to match the shirt.

== Grounds ==
The club played at Townhead Park.
