= Carrick F.C. =

Former association football club in Scotland

Carrick
- Full name: Carrick Football Club
- Founded: 1874
- Dissolved: 1888
- Ground: Saracen Park
- Hon. Secretary: George Thompson
- Match Secretary: John Sinclair
Home colours

Carrick Football Club was a 19th-century football club originally from the Partick area of Glasgow in Scotland, but which moved to Possilpark for a brief period.

== History ==
The club was founded in August 1874 playing in Maryhill. For most of its existence the club played low-level football.

In 1884, Possilpark F.C. dissolved, and its ground at Saracen Park was put up for rent. Carrick took on the ground from the start of the 1885–86 season and joined the Scottish Football Association, entitling it to enter the Scottish Cup, which it did for the first time in 1886–87.

Initially the move looked promising, as, in one of its first senior matches, Carrick beat Kirkintilloch Athletic 5–0, and later beat Wishaw Swifts; although the club lost at Lindertis of Forfarshire, it was at least well-regarded enough to be able to play friendlies distance from Glasgow.

The step-up to senior competition however proved to be another matter. In the first round of the Cup in 1886–87, the club lost 2–0 at home to Westbourne, a club with little pedigree. The club's second and last entry, in 1887–88, was disastrous; Carrick lost 10–0 at home to Thistle of east Glasgow in the first round.

The club did continue playing afterwards, and Saracen Park is still described as Carrick's home at the close of the season. However the move to senior football, in an area with more established clubs like Cowlairs and Northern, appears to have been too ambitious, as the club disappears before the 1888–89 season, and the ground is taken over by Temperance Athletic.

== Colours ==
The club played in royal blue and white one-inch striped shirts, and dark blue shorts with white stripes.

== Ground ==
The club originally played in Maryhill; by 1884–85 the club had moved to Kelvinside. As a senior club, it played at Saracen Park, behind the Saracen Foundry, in Possilpark, north Glasgow. The pitch was 120 yards x 78 yards, and the ground had a clubhouse and 36 ft tall flagpole. The ground is close to the current Saracen Park, opened in 1937.
