= Westbourne F.C. =

Former association football club in Scotland

Westbourne
- Full name: Westbourne Football Club
- Founded: 1879
- Dissolved: 1888
- Ground: Mosside Park
- Hon. Secretary: William W Lang
- Match Secretary: John M'Callum
Home colours

Westbourne Football Club was a 19th-century football club originally from the Strathbungo area of Glasgow.

== History ==
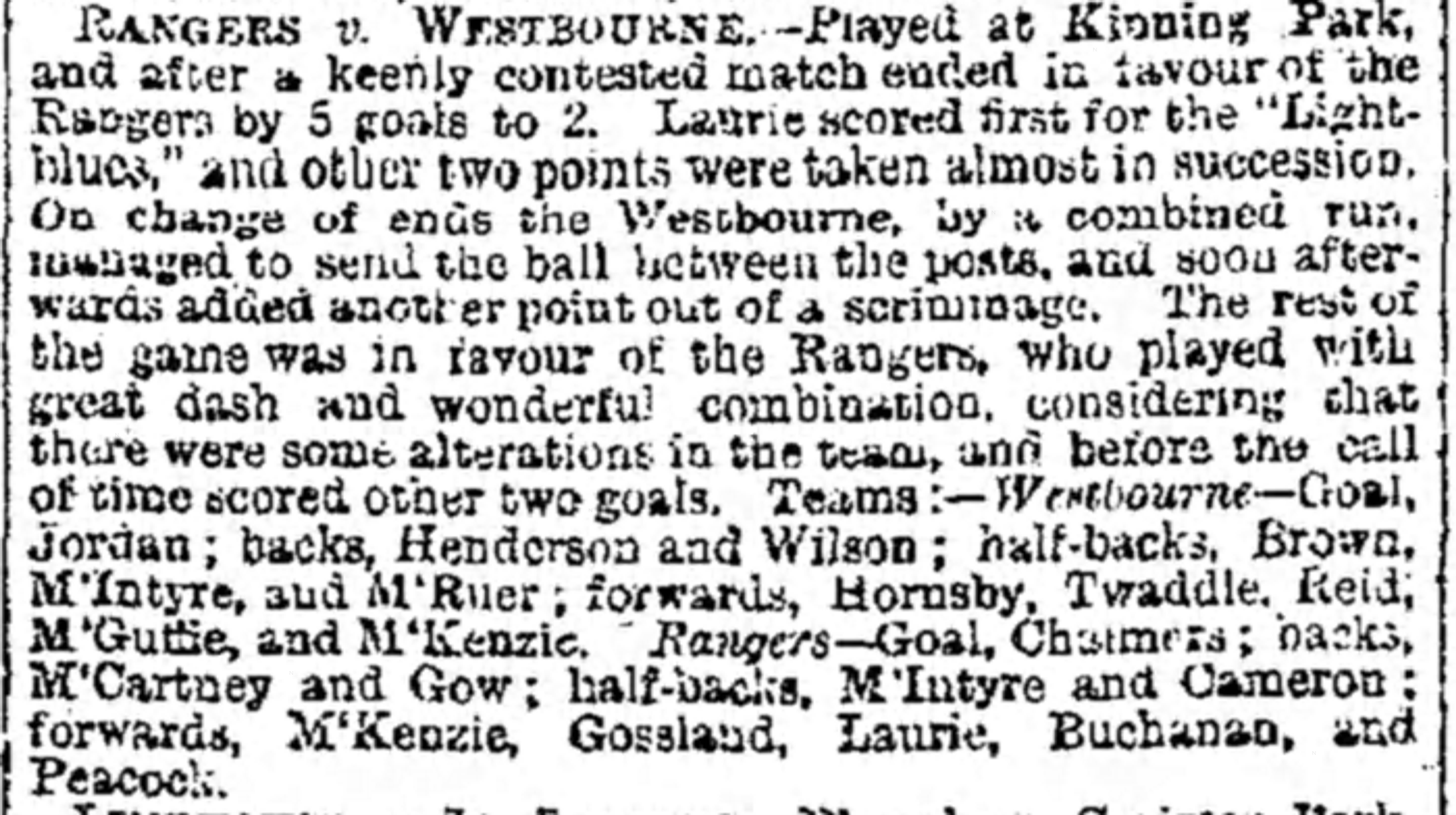
Rangers 5–2 Westbourne, Scottish Cup Second Round, 1886–87, Glasgow Herald 4 October 1886

The club was founded in 1879. Its matches gained no attention until it started to play Senior opposition in 1884–85.

Westbourne was admitted as a member of the Scottish Football Association in August 1885 and entered the Scottish Cup for the first time in 1885–86. The club lost 11–0 at Thistle in the first round, the first six goals coming in the 25 minutes before half-time, and Sloan in the Thistle goal only having one save to make.

The club's second entry to the Cup, in 1886–87, saw the club's only win in the competition; 2–0 at Carrick. In the second round, the club was drawn away to Rangers. Having turned around at half-time 3–0 down, Westbourne pulled two goals back, but ultimately conceded two further goals.

Westbourne was a founder member of the Glasgow Football Association in 1887–88 and entered the Glasgow Cup that season, beating St Andrews 4–1 at Moray Park in the first round, but going down 5–1 to Rangers (by now at the first Ibrox Park) in the second.

The club also entered the Scottish Cup that season and played a "plucky game" at Partick Thistle, albeit the forwards being criticized for lacking combination; regardless, the club lost 10–0. Westbourne did finish the season by entering the Govan Jubilee Cup for the only time, and was given a bye into the semi-final, but lost 8–2 at eventual winners Whitefield.

The club seems to have dissolved at the end of the season; it was one of the smaller clubs in the area, with only 50 members in 1886, more than only three other senior clubs in the Glasgow FA. The club did not pay its subscription for 1888–89 and was therefore struck from the roll.

== Colours ==
The club originally wore white shirts, blue knickers, and blue hose. In 1886 it was one of the first Scottish clubs to wear vertical stripes, adopting red and white striped shirts, with the same blue knickers and hose.

== Ground ==
The club played at Moss Side Park, near the Moss Side Brickworks, officially part of Strathbungo although geographically in Crossmyloof.
