= Kirkintilloch Central F.C. =

Association football club in Kirkintilloch, Scotland

Kirkintilloch Central
- Full name: Kirkintilloch Central Football Club
- Founded: 1885
- Dissolved: 1889
- Ground: Westermains Park
- Secretary: Andrew Aitken
1885–87 colours	1887–89 colours

Kirkintilloch Central Football Club was a 19th-century association football club based in Kirkintilloch in Dunbartonshire.

== History ==
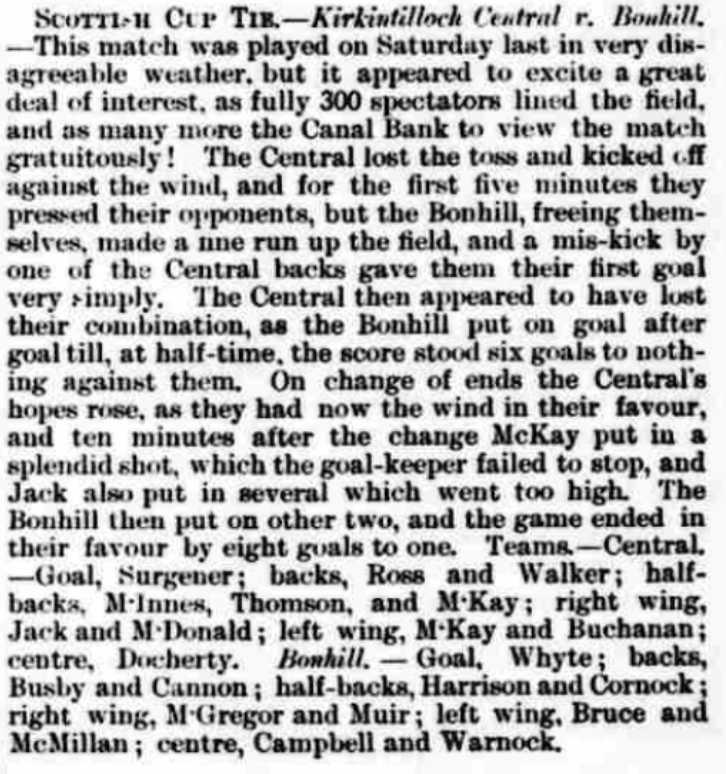
1886–87 Scottish Cup 1st Round, Kirkintilloch Central 1–8 Bonhill, Kirkintilloch Herald, 15 September 1886

The club was formed in 1885, at the same time as Kirkintilloch Athletic and Kirkintilloch Harp. While Athletic joined the Scottish Football Association for the 1885–86 season, Central and Harp did not do so until the next season; this appears to have been costly for both clubs, as players who wanted to play in the Scottish Cup joined the more ambitious Athletic.

The club's first match was a 3–0 win against the Athletic's second XI in October 1885. There was evidently some bitterness between the sides later, a friendly with Athletics in April 1886 having to be abandoned, with the Athletics 3–0 up, after some of the 500 in attendance invaded the pitch in protest at a Central goal being disallowed. The Central fans were also blamed for spoiling a friendly between the Athletic and Bonhill in October 1886 by turning up with 20 minutes to go and "shouting so loudly". However the three senior clubs, plus Junior club Kirkintilloch Rob Roy, did club together to buy a trophy for a town competition, the Jubilee Cup, to commemorate the Golden Jubilee of Queen Victoria in 1887.

With Dunbartonshire boasting three of the strongest clubs in the world (Renton, Vale of Leven, and Dumbarton), all of whom were Scottish Cup winners by 1885, and with three senior clubs vying for support in one small town, Central found it impossible to compete on an adequate level. Its three Scottish Cup appearances saw a run of embarrassing defeats:

- 1886–87: 8–1 at home to Bonhill
- 1887–88: 5–1 at Kirkintilloch Athletic
- 1888–89: 13–1 at Dumbarton

There was little respite in the Dunbartonshire Cup either, as the club was faced with similar draws to those in the national cup, which was regionalized in the early rounds. The club's first tie in the competition, in 1886–87, was an 8–0 defeat at home to Union, six of the goals coming in the first half, and Union time-wasting in the second; the referee intimated he would have supported a Central protest against rough play, but, given the margin, the club decided an appeal would have looked like "petty spite".

The club suffered heavy defeats in the next two seasons as well - 10–4 at home to Vale of Leven Wanderers in the second round in 1887–88, the score being 3–3 at half-time but the Wanderers' superior fitness telling, scoring another seven before the final consolation goal; and 8–0 at home to Methlan Park in the first round in 1888–89. The Methlan Park score could have been worse, but the Central walked off the pitch because of darkness with 8 minutes remaining.

The one spark of light was its only competitive win in the first round of 1887–88, a remarkable 9–1 hammering of Dumbarton Harp, and the Harp's one was "taken in the dusk". The club was a victim of geography; it obtained respectable results when playing outside the county, such as beating Whifflet Shamrock 4–0 in September 1888. However the club had suffered from players leaving for more lucrative employment, and only had seven of its regular first time in the 1888–89 Cup tie with Dumbarton. A further blow came with the loss of its ground in November 1888, which caused its players to seek matches elsewhere.

The final match recorded for the club was a 5–1 defeat to Athletic in the town cup. The inevitable axe fell in August 1889, when the club was struck off the Scottish FA roll for non-payment of subscriptions. The club had entered the Dunbartonshire Cup, but had broken up before the start of the season.

== Colours ==
The club originally played in orange and blue hooped jerseys and hose, with blue knickers. In 1887 the club changed to white.

== Grounds ==
The club's ground was originally Westermains Park, Kerr Street, Bellfield, a 10-minute walk from Kirkintilloch railway station. One issue with the ground was that it was possible to watch for free from Canal Bank; it was reckoned that 300 paid to see the Cup tie with Bonhill, and 300 watched from the Bank.

In 1887 it moved to Springfield Park, the first game there being the win over Dumbarton Harp.
