= Nithsdale F.C. =

Former association football club in Scotland

Nithsdale Football Club
- Full name: Nithsdale
- Founded: 1885
- Dissolved: 1889
- Ground: Victoria Park
- Hon. Secretary: James Williamson, J. W. Blacklock
- Match Secretary: James Swan
- Captain: Symonds, R. F. Macbeth-Robinson
Home colours

Nithsdale Football Club was an association football club from Dumfries, Scotland.

== History ==
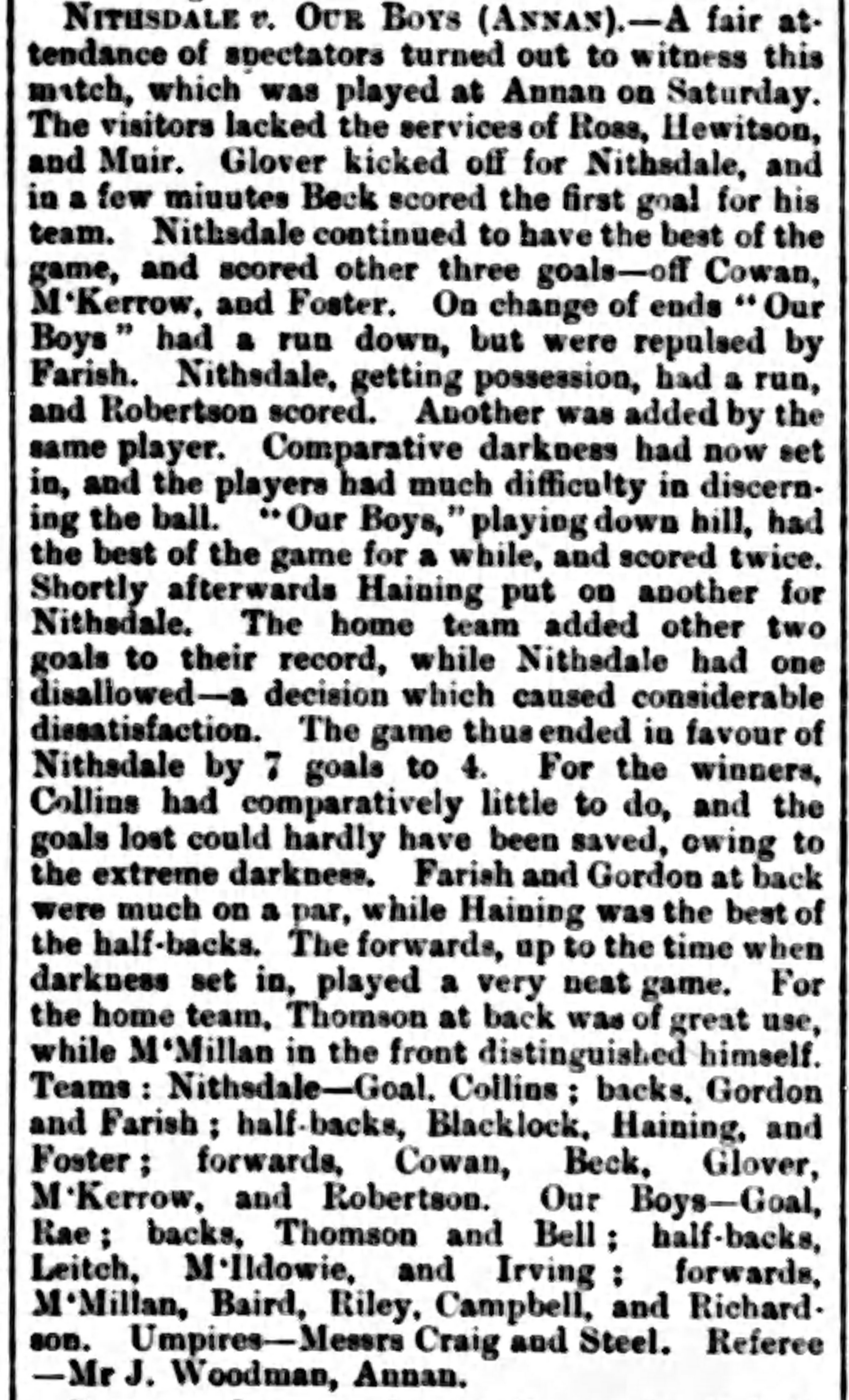
A rare win for Nithsdale, in a friendly against Our Boys (Annan); from the Dumfries and Galloway Standard of 9 November 1887

The club was founded in 1885. The club may have had a connection with the Union Bank as at least two of its honorary secretaries worked there. It entered the Churchill Cup, a competition for clubs from the county, in its first season, and lost 6–1 at Moffat in the first round. The same season, the club was invited to take part in the Southern Counties Charity Cup, but lost 10–1 to the 5th Kirkcudbrightshire Rifle Volunteers in its one match.

Nithsdale entered the Scottish Cup for the first time in 1886–87, but, having been drawn against the Queen of the South Wanderers, the strongest team in the area, Nithsdale withdrew.

The following two seasons saw the club play its only fixtures in the competition. After the club drew a bye in the first round in 1887–88, the club lost 9–2 at home to the 5th K.R.V., and in the first round in 1888–89 was hammered 13–0 at Newton Stewart Athletic.

In the local competitions the club suffered similar defeats. In 1886–87, Nithsdale lost 13–1 at Moffat in the Churchill Cup, albeit an early injury caused the club to play almost the entire match one short, and lost 10–1 to Queen of the South Wanderers in the Charity Cup. 1887–88 would be the club's best season, as it reached the second round of the Churchill Cup; this was having lost 9–2 to QoS Wanderers - having taken the lead, and having played a "scientific and gentlemanly game" - but the Wanderers were disqualified over a professionalism scandal and Nithsdale re-instated. The 5th K.R.V. beat Nithsdale 12–2 at the Recreation Grounds in the second round. In the Charity Cup, Nithsdale recorded its best ever result in competitive football - losing only 5–2 to Moffat.

Nithsdale suffered much worse defeats in 1888–89; 9–1 to the 5th K.R.V. in the Churchill Cup, 14–1 at the same club in the Southern Counties Charity Cup, and 11–2 and 17–3 at Queen of the South Wanderers in two friendlies. The former lasted only 60 minutes and the Wanderers' goalkeeper Lawson was so bored he went upfield to join in the attacks, scored one goal, and had another disallowed for offside. In the latter, the Nithsdale defender Farish played in goal for the Wanderers. Even when four of the regular Nithsdale players were replaced by Queen of the South Wanderers players for a friendly with the 5th K.R.V., the club went down 7–0, and "without the assistance of the Wanderers, who were the most prominent throughout the game in the Nithsdale ranks, the Volunteers would have had the play much as they liked".

The club did have occasional friendly wins, the biggest being 7–0 over the Annan Oddfellows in 1888–89, but the club's ultimate humiliation came at the end of season Andrew Lawson Cup competition. Nithsdale hosted the 5th K.R.V.'s second eleven, and lost by the "surprising majority of 27 goals to 1", 18 of which came in the first half.

The club members seem to have had a re-think after that defeat; the club secretary at the time, J. W. Blacklock, was involved in starting up a fresh club, Dumfries, which claimed to be a continuation of the Nithsdale, although it sported different colours and played at a former Nithsdale ground.

== Colours ==
The club's colours were maroon jerseys and hose, and white knickers.

== Ground ==
The club played at Victoria Park, Green Brae, for its first two seasons, moving Milldamhead in 1887 and the Recreation Grounds in 1889.
