= Yoker F.C. =

Association football club in Dunbartonshire, Scotland

Yoker
- Full name: Yoker Football Club
- Founded: 1876
- Dissolved: 1887
- Ground: Holm Park
- Match Secretary: Dugald C. Maccoll
Home colours

Yoker Football Club was an association football club based in the Scottish town of Yoker, now part of Glasgow.

== History ==
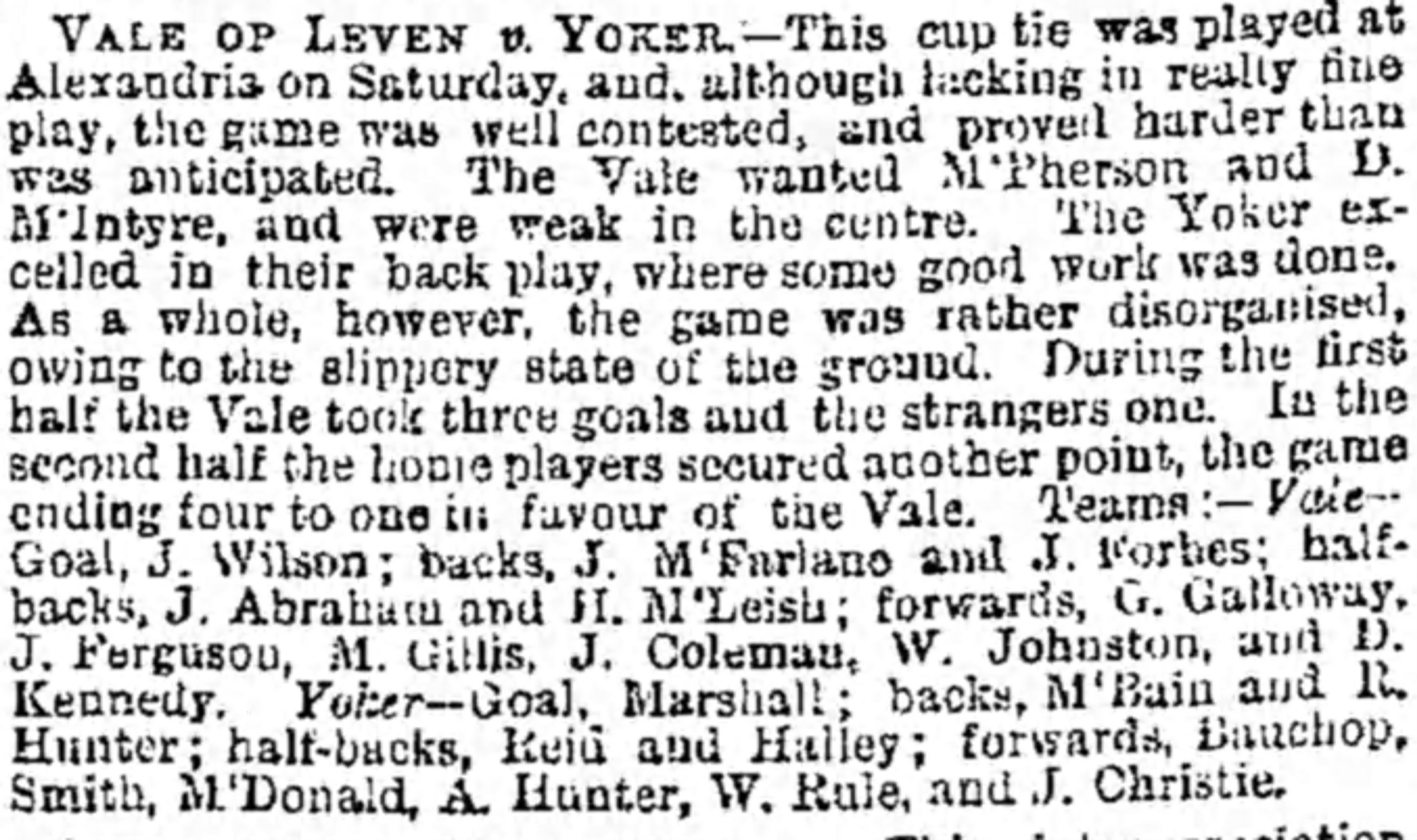
Vale of Leven 4–1 Yoker, 1884–85 Scottish Cup 3rd Round, Glasgow Herald, 27 October 1884

Yoker claimed a foundation date in 1876 and its earliest fixture recorded is a 6–0 defeat by Jordanhill in 1878.

The club originally played within the purview of Renfrewshire, and its first entry to the Scottish Cup, in 1879–80, saw the club drawn to visit Thornliebank, the holders of the Renfrewshire Cup, the home side winning 4–0. Perhaps considering that the Renfrewshire Cup was a step too far, Yoker played more local competitive football, and twice played in the final of the low-key Yoker Cup.

Yoker finally entered the Renfrewshire Cup in 1882–83 and 1883–84, but only won one tie, and twice went out to Southern of Greenock.

Yoker's Scottish Cup performances had been unremarkable, until, in 1884–85, the Dunbartonshire Association was founded, and Yoker switched allegiance. This put it in the Dunbartonshire area of the Scottish Cup draw, which included Stirlingshire from the second round. In the first round, Yoker beat Rock of Dumbarton, 2–0, away from home; in the second, the club hammered Tayavalla 17–0; this broke the previous Scottish Cup record of 16–0, for Vale of Leven against Milngavie in 1882, and was also higher than the FA Cup record of the same score, set by Wanderers against Farningham in 1874. This performance may have been due to the presence of John Christie, a former Bolton Wanderers and Rangers player who had recently joined the side, and who played in the club's third round defeat at Vale of Leven.

Yoker took part in the first Dunbartonshire Cup in 1884–85, and reached the semi-final, away at Dumbarton. The young Yoker side took the lead after 20 minutes by rushing Dumbarton goalkeeper M'Aulay through the goal, but three Dumbarton goals in the second half put the home side through. It was the only time the club reached so far.

Yoker lost its ground temporarily before the 1885–86 Scottish Cup got under way and Yoker the club had to host its tie with Union at the Dalmuir Thistle ground, which proved disastrous, as, despite Yoker winning 5–1, Union successfully obtained a replay, on the basis that the ground was 7 feet too narrow at one end. Union won the replayed tie (at Dumbarton Athletic's Burnside Park) 1–0, the heavier Yoker side suffering from a lack of practice, and missing out on an equalizer when the referee inadvertently stopped a goalbound Yoker shot late on.

Yoker gained revenge in the first round in the following season, coming from 2–0 down at half-time to beat Union 4–2, although Union tried to get some recompense by protesting that Yoker had not paid out a fair share of the gate money; the protest was dismissed on the Nelsonian basis that Yoker had not put any checks in place. In the second round, Yoker lost 4–0 at Dumbarton, all of the goals coming in the second half. The clubs met one month later in the second round of the Dunbartonshire Cup, this time Yoker losing 9–0, the first five goals coming in a burst between the 30th and 45th minute.

1886–87 was the club's last season; the club's final two matches were against the new Blairvaddick club for the Govan Jubilee Cup, which Blairvaddick won at the second time of asking 1–0. Yoker was struck from the roll for non-payment of subscriptions in August 1887.

== Colours ==
The club's colours were navy shirts, white knickers, and red hose, apart from between 1885 and 1887 when the knickers were also navy.

== Ground ==
The club played at Holm Park, close to Ferry Road Head and Renfrew Wharf railway station on the other side of the River Clyde.

== Notable players ==
- John Christie, formerly of Bolton and Rangers
- Richard Hunter, later capped for Scotland, and who was the club's match secretary for its final season
