= Levendale F.C. (1889) =

Association football club in Dunbartonshire, Scotland

Levendale
- Full name: Levendale Football Club
- Nickname(s): the Light Blues
- Founded: 1889
- Dissolved: 1893
- Ground: Institute Park
- Hon. Secretary: John Tait
- Match Secretary: J. MacKinnon
Home colours

Levendale Football Club was an association football club from Alexandria, Dumbartonshire, active in the 19th century, and was the second senior club of that name.

== History ==
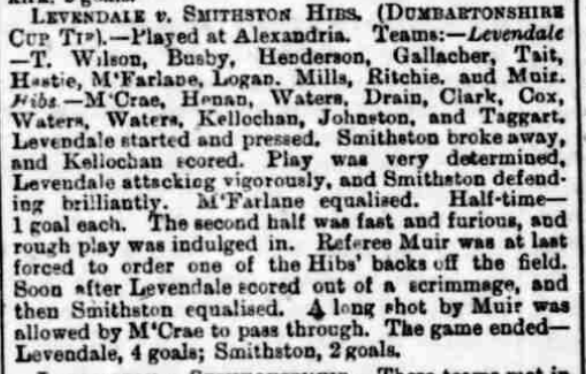
1892–93 Dumbartonshire Cup semi-final, Levendale 4–2 Smithstone Hibs, Falkirk Herald, 4 February 1893

The earliest record of the club is a 3–1 win over the Vale of Clyde in February 1890.

The club joined the Scottish Football Association in August 1892, after a season in which the club had not been able to play a single match, as "the senior team in the neighbourhood" (the Vale of Leven) was "employing most of the young talent". The club hoped, by recruiting a number of former Vale players with the promise of senior football, that it could retain a more consistent XI.

The club only played the 1892–93 season as a senior club, in which it lost 14 of its 24 matches. It played in the qualifying rounds of the 1892–93 Scottish Cup, and was one match short of playing in the Scottish Cup proper, going down 4–1 at Motherwell in the fourth and final preliminary round, Levendale handicapped when 1–0 down by an injury to Logan. The Motherwell press was not complimentary of Levendale, claiming the club behaved "very shabbily" after the game and "took their defeat...in a most ungentlemanly manner".

However, the club had a remarkable run in its only Dumbartonshire Cup entry, thanks in part to Renton not entering, and the Dumbartonshire FA keeping Vale of Leven and Dumbarton exempt until the semi-finals, due to their Scottish League commitments. Three wins put Levendale into the final, played at Renton's Tontine Park, but opponent Dumbarton was too strong, with a 7–1 victory, Levendale conceding three late goals.

Levendale however could not capitalize on the fine run, with League football decimating clubs in smaller towns. It never entered the Dumbartonshire Cup again and scratched from its final entry to the Scottish Cup in 1893–94.

== Colours ==
The club wore light blue shirts and white knickers.

== Ground ==
The club's home ground was Institute Park.
