= Jerry Reynolds (footballer) =

Scottish footballer

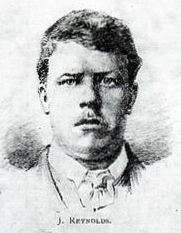
- Portrait of Reynolds in 1892

Personal information
- Full name: Jeremiah Reynolds
- Date of birth: 15 April 1867
- Place of birth: Maryhill, Scotland
- Date of death: 26 December 1944 (aged 77)
- Place of death: Glasgow, Scotland
- Position: Full back

Senior career*
Years	Team	Apps	(Gls)
- Cowlairs
1886–1887	Hibernian	0	(0)
1889–1895	Celtic	74	(0)
1895–1899	Burnley	107	(0)
- * Club domestic league appearances and goals

Jeremiah Reynolds (15 April 1867 – 26 December 1944) was a Scottish professional footballer who played as a full back.

== Death ==
Reynolds died on 26 December 1944 at the age of 77.
