= Pollokshields F.C. =

Association football club in Glasgow City, Scotland

Pollokshields/St Andrew's
- Full name: Pollokshields Football Club
- Founded: 1878
- Dissolved: 1888
- Ground: Lorne Park
- Secretary: Andrew Seaton Jr
Home colours

Pollokshields Football Club was a Scottish football team, based in the Pollokshields district of Glasgow (at the time a separate burgh). From 1885 the club was called St Andrew's.

== History ==
=== Pollokshields ===
The club was founded in 1878, as a junior side. Pollokshields joined the Scottish Football Association in 1884. At the time it turned senior, the club had 30 members, which made it the joint smallest senior team in Glasgow (with Orchard); the older Pollokshields Athletic had 112 members.

It entered the Scottish Cup for the first round in 1884–85, and was unlucky to draw Queen's Park, the biggest team of the era, in the first round. The game took place at Copeland Park in Govan and ended 4–0 to Queen's Park.

=== St Andrew's ===
Before the start of the 1885–86 season, the club changed its name to St Andrew's, possibly as an extra distinguishing factor from Pollokshields Athletic; the club also moved to ground, and changed its colours.

Its first competitive match under its new name was in the second round of the 1885–86 Scottish Cup, as the club had had a walkover in the first round; the second round tie was an easy 6–0 win over Glasgow Cambridge. The third round tie was against the 3rd Lanarkshire Rifle Volunteers, another strong Glaswegian team, and the Hi-Hi duly won 11–0.

The pattern of easy win followed by heavy defeat was repeated in the 1886-87 Scottish Cup, albeit with a twist. In the first round, the club was drawn to play at Pollokshields Athletic, and lost 5–2. However St Andrew's put in a successful protest (on the basis that the Athletic had chalked the goal lines behind the goal posts) and won the replayed tie - at Lorne Park - 4–1. In the second round the club lost 12–0 at Thistle.

Despite beating the more established club in the area, St Andrew's had never caught the imagination the same way, and remained much the smaller side. Its last Scottish Cup entry in 1887–88 ended in first round defeat at Kelvinside Athletic and St Andrew's had disbanded by the summer. The club did not pay its Scottish FA subscription for 1888–89 and was therefore struck from the roll.

== Colours ==
As Pollokshields, the club wore dark blue and white hooped jerseys with dark blue "trousers". On changing name to St Andrew's, the club changed to white shirts with "dark" knickers. In 1887 the club changed its shirts to blue and white vertical stripes.

== Grounds ==
The club originally played at Murcia Park. With the name change to St Andrew's, the club moved to Lorne Park, which had been the hone of Pollokshields Athletic until 1878 and of Mavisbank until 1884.
