= Vale of Leven Wanderers F.C. =

Association football club in Dunbartonshire, Scotland

Vale of Leven Wanderers
- Full name: Vale of Leven Wanderers Football Club
- Nickname(s): the Cheughs
- Founded: 1883
- Dissolved: 1891
- Ground: Balloch Road
- President: Allan M'Lean
Home colours

Vale of Leven Wanderers Football Club was an association football club based in the town of Alexandria, in the Vale of Leven area of West Dunbartonshire.

== History ==
The club was founded in 1883 "to strengthen and stimulate young men in athletics", It was the second club of that name; the first Vale of Leven Wanderers, formed in 1877, was refused membership to the Scottish Football Association for not having its own ground and disbanded shortly afterwards.

This club was admitted to the SFA in August 1883 and entered the Scottish Cup in its first season; drawn against Dunbritton, the Wanderers lost in a replay, becoming the only club ever to lose to Dunbritton in the latter's 13 entries to the competition.

The club was hampered by being in the shadow of the more established sides in the area, and Vale of Leven was able to "requisition" Wanderers players for more important matches. The club may also have been finding it difficult to find a suitable pitch as in 1885 it proposed a change in the laws of the game (as applied in Scotland) to reduce the maximum size of pitch from 200 x 100 yards to 130 x 65.

Nevertheless, the club was showing signs of prominence. In 1884–85 it lost in the Scottish Cup to Renton, but only by 2–1, and also went out to the Vale of Leven in the Dumbartonshire Cup by the same score. Before the start of the 1885–86 season, it was one of eight clubs invited to take part in the Dumbartonshire FA's summer tournament, losing 2–0 to Dumbarton Athletic in the semi-final, the first goal coming when goalkeeper M'Callum caught the ball but was barged between the posts by the Athletics' Alex Latta. In the Dumbartonshire Cup proper that season, the club reached the semi-final.

These results had the added complication of making the club known to clubs in England, who, being professional, could approach the amateur Scottish players; half-back M'Lean guested for Accrington in a friendly match at Dumbarton in 1886, although there was no permanent transfer.

The club thought it had gained its first victory in the Scottish Cup in 1886–87, beating Jamestown 6–3, but the Jamestown club protested on the basis that the Wanderers' John Cummings had not been properly registered; the Scottish FA upheld the protest and awarded the tie to Jamestown.

=== 1887–88: Scottish Cup quarter-final ===
The 1887–88 season proved to be the club's best. The club was bolstered by a number of players from Vale of Leven, and reached the final of the pre-season Dunbartonshire tournament, losing to Renton after goalkeeper M'Callum "bungled" a shot. On the national stage, the club won through four Scottish Cup ties, and enjoyed one bye, to reach the quarter-finals. the most remarkable result was in the fifth round tie at Thistle of east Glasgow; the home side was expected to win, but appalling weather had made the pitch resemble a "clay hole", and at half-time the Wanderers were 4–1 up. By the time the Thistle scored their second goal, the Wanderers had notched another five. The club was unlucky to be drawn away to Queen's Park in the last eight, but started the game with a rush, and scored a goal inside five minutes. That was as good as it got for the Wanderers; by half-time they were 3–1 down and the final score was 7–1 to Queen's Park.

The club was still in the Dumbartonshire Cup, and in the semi-final, against Vale of Leven, led with 15 minutes remaining; the Vale equalized while the Wanderers were disputing a throw-in award, and then won the tie with the literal last kick of the game, the Wanderers' umpire asserting that time was up before the ball entered the goal, but the referee stating that 30 seconds remained in the match. The Wanderers' formal protest against the result was dismissed.

=== Loss of ground and decline ===
The club fell off badly in 1888–89, the problem being that it lost its Balloch Road ground and had difficulty finding another, and, by the time it did so, it was too late to organize fixtures. Further, the club had the worst possible draw in the second round of the Cup, as opponents Renton had not only won the Scottish Cup, but also had beaten the FA Cup winners West Bromwich Albion. Although the Wanderers kept the match tight in the first half, turning around 3–2 down, Renton scored seven unanswered goals in the second half. The club also lost 5–0 to Dumbarton in the county cup, the lack of match fitness showing with four goals conceded in the second half. The impact was not just sporting, but financial; the club lost a significant amount of income through not playing and never caught back up.

The Wanderers opened the 1889–90 season against the Vale of Leven at the Wanderers' ground, with the senior side winning 9–0. It was an indication of things to come. Although the Wanderers did get to the semi-final of the county cup for the third time, it was after winning just one tie, and it conceded 9 goals to Strathmore of Dundee in a friendly and 8 to Queen's Park in the Scottish Cup. By the end of the season the club president was conceding that the finances were "on the wrong side".

The foundation of the Scottish League in 1890 was the final blow for the club. Dumbarton, Vale of Leven, and Renton were founder members, and, with most of the attention now given to League matches, and less opportunity for lucrative friendlies against top local sides, the Wanderers could no longer afford to run a second eleven, and refused to play in the second round of the Scottish Cup against Adventurers because the Edinburgh side's Slateford Road ground was part of a public park - which meant no gate money. The Scottish FA however turned down the Wanderers' protest.

The club collapsed completely after drawing at Jamestown in the Dumbartonshire Cup - the club lost the home replay 12–1. The club did not play competitively again and, at the end of the season, was wound up.

I deeply regred that the financial difficulties forced us to consider the advisability of continuing the struggle against a waning enthusiasm and a decrease of popular feeling among the professing followers of the best of British pastimes. -Allan M'Lean

There were two final entries into the Scottish Cup preliminary rounds, in 1892–93 and 1893–94, in the name of Vale of Leven Wanderers, both resulting in the club scratching before its scheduled first ties.

== Colours ==
The club's colours were black and white striped shirts and socks, with blue knickers.

== Ground ==
The club originally did not have a ground, and played "home" matches at a public park. By 1887 it was playing at Balloch Road, and after it was forced to move, eventually found a pitch at Hill Street.

In January and February 1890 the club's ground was broken into by three schoolboys who stole footballs on the basis that they were "mad for a game" - they were sentenced to six stripes of the birch rod.

== Nickname ==
The club was nicknamed "the Cheughs", a dialect word meaning "toughs", "for its gameness".

== Notable players ==
- James Wilson, later a Scottish Cup finalist with Vale of Leven
- John Murray, later of Sunderland AFC
- Frank Dyer, who played for a number of clubs in the Football League
- Tom M'Lean, brother of club secretary Allan M'Lean, who moved to Notts County
