= John Gow (footballer, born 1869) =

Scottish footballer

Personal information
- Full name: John Robertson Gow
- Date of birth: 17 April 1869
- Place of birth: Blair Atholl, Scotland
- Position: Outside forward

Senior career*
Years	Team	Apps	(Gls)
1885–1889	Rangers		

International career
1888	Scotland	1	(0)
- * Club domestic league appearances and goals

John Robertson Gow (born 17 April 1869) was a Scottish footballer who played as an outside forward.

== Career ==
Born in Blair Atholl, Gow played club football for Rangers, and made one appearance for Scotland in 1888. He later became the club president of Rangers in 1896.

== Personal life ==
Gow was also a noted sprinter and hurdler. His brother Donald was also a Scottish international player.
