= James McLaren (footballer) =

Scottish footballer

Personal information
- Full name: James McLaren
- Place of birth: Lugar, Ayrshire, Scotland
- Position: Half-back

Senior career*
Years	Team	Apps	(Gls)
1883–1888	Hibernian	0	(0)
1888–1891	Celtic		
- Greenock Morton
- Clyde
1895–1896	Celtic		

International career
1888–1890	Scotland	3	(1)
- * Club domestic league appearances and goals

James McLaren (born in Lugar) was a Scottish footballer, who played for Hibernian, Celtic, Greenock Morton, Clyde and Scotland. He won three caps for Scotland, scoring one goal and captaining the side once.

== See also ==
- List of Scotland national football team captains
