= Alclutha F.C. =

Former association football club in Scotland

Alclutha
- Full name: Alclutha Football Club
- Founded: 1872
- Dissolved: 1888
- Ground: Barloan Toll, Dumbarton
- Hon. Secretary: Alex. Kennedy Jr
- President: Archibald Paton, M. McCallum
Home colours

Alclutha Football Club was a football club based in Dumbarton, Scotland. From 1883 the club was called Dunbritton Football Club.

The name Alclutha derives from the Scots Gaelic name for the town, and means "rock of the Clyde". Dunbritton is an old form of Dumbarton, meaning "Britons' fort".

== History ==
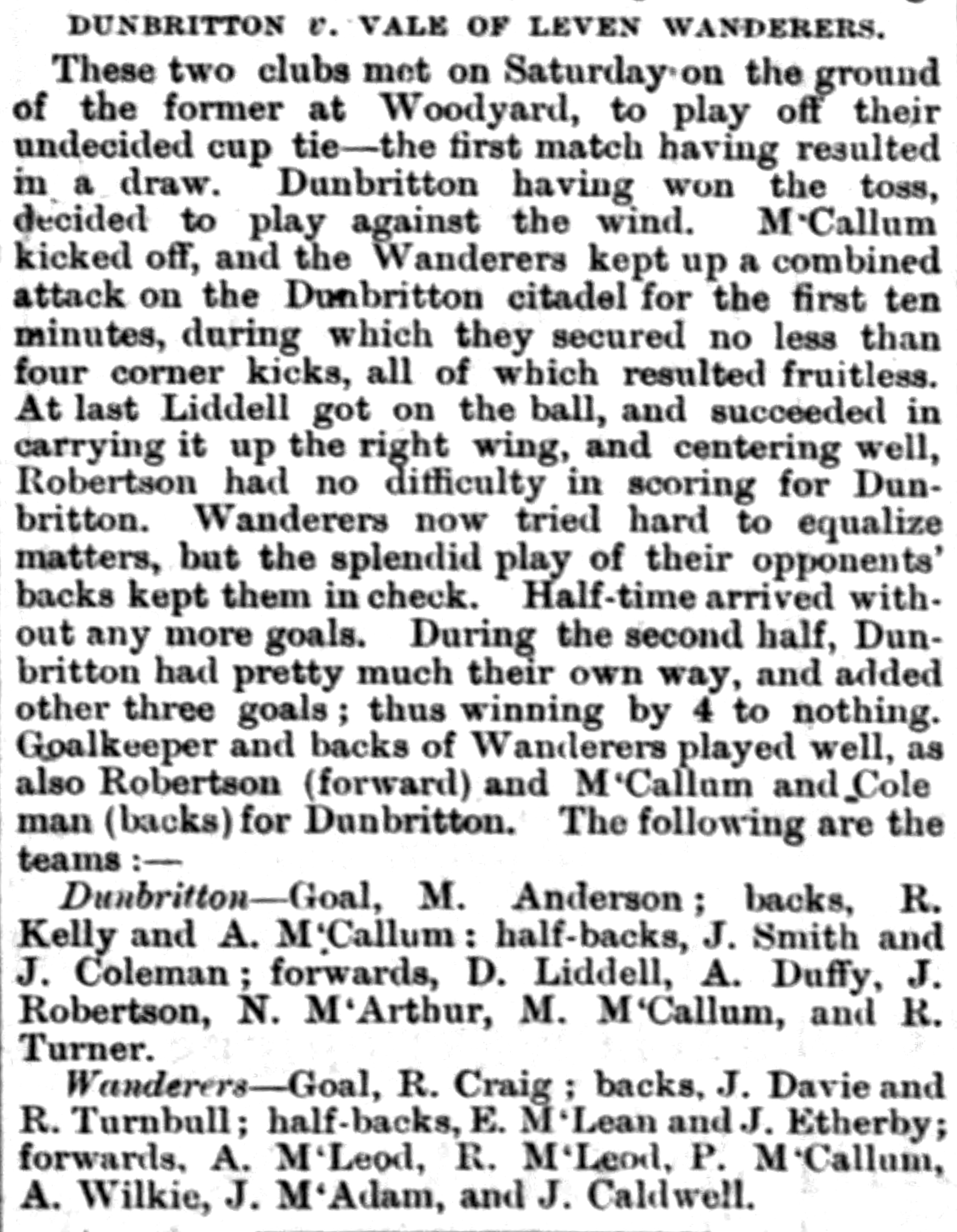
1883–84 Scottish Cup first round replay, Dunbritton 4–0 Vale of Leven Wanderers, Dumbarton Observer, 22 September 1883

Dunbartonshire was a hotbed of the game in the early years of organised football in Scotland, with the county's three leading clubs of the era, Dumbarton, Renton and Vale of Leven all forming in 1872, emerging out of shinty clubs in local factories who were turned to the association game by the influence of Queen's Park.

Alclutha was formed in the same year, but did not have the same factory backing. It was therefore always in the shadow of the other Dunbartonshire clubs; indeed, it issued a series of challenges to Dumbarton F.C. in early 1875, none of which was answered, "they evidently thinking of themselves far above us...that it was not worth their while wasting time on us." Although it entered the Scottish Cup consistently from 1875–76 to 1887–88, it only won one of its 12 matches in the competition.

The club's first match in the competition was arguably the club's best performance. Drawn at home to Renton, the lighter Alclutha side dominated the first half, despite kicking into the wind, and only conceded a winner in the 85th minute, after a stray pass from one of the backs allowed the heavier Renton forwards to force the ball home.

The club was competitive in the 1870s, with goalkeeper Fraser being chosen for the Dunbartonshire representative side in 1876, despite both Renton and Vale of Leven having been Scottish Cup finalists. However the club's lack of backing ensured it could never develop into a permanently strong club. As early as 1877 the club noted that its best players were being enticed by other sides, and in 1878, its best-ever player, James McAulay, was poached by Dumbarton after he had impressed playing as a back in the 6–0 Cup defeat by Vale of Leven.

After eight consecutive first round defeats in the Cup, the club's change of name to Dunbritton - the name having been used before, for a club which played on public parkland - brought an instant change of luck. In the 1883–84 tournament, the club was drawn to play Vale of Leven Wanderers at Alexandria, and obtained a draw; even better, the club won the replay 4–0, for its only ever competitive victory.

However, after losing to Jamestown in the second round by 7–1, the club barely played. It entered the Scottish Cup for the next three seasons but withdrew every time; the Dumbartonshire Cup competition started in 1884–85 and the club entered for the first two seasons, but again withdrew before playing a match.

The club's final match appears to have been a 10–2 Scottish Cup defeat at Dumbarton in 1887, and the club was struck from the Scottish FA register in 1888. The Alclutha name was revived for an exhibition match between former players at Dumbarton's Boghead Park in 1893.

== Colours ==
The club originally wore dark blue shirts with white knickerbockers/shorts and red hose. In 1878 the club changed to all navy blue, and in 1881 re-adopted white knickers, but retained the navy stockings. This remained the club's outfit until its demise.

== Ground ==
The club played on a pitch near Barloan Toll in Dumbarton until 1880. After then it moved to Woodyard Park.
