= Jamestown F.C. =

Association football club in Dunbartonshire, Scotland

Jamestown
- Full name: Jamestown Football Club
- Founded: 1877
- Dissolved: 1893
- Ground: Balloch Road
- Secretary: John Miller, Lewis Downes, Peter Macadam
Home colours

Jamestown Football Club was an association football club based in the village of Jamestown, in the Vale of Leven area of West Dunbartonshire, which entered the Scottish Cup from 1878 to 1890.

== History ==
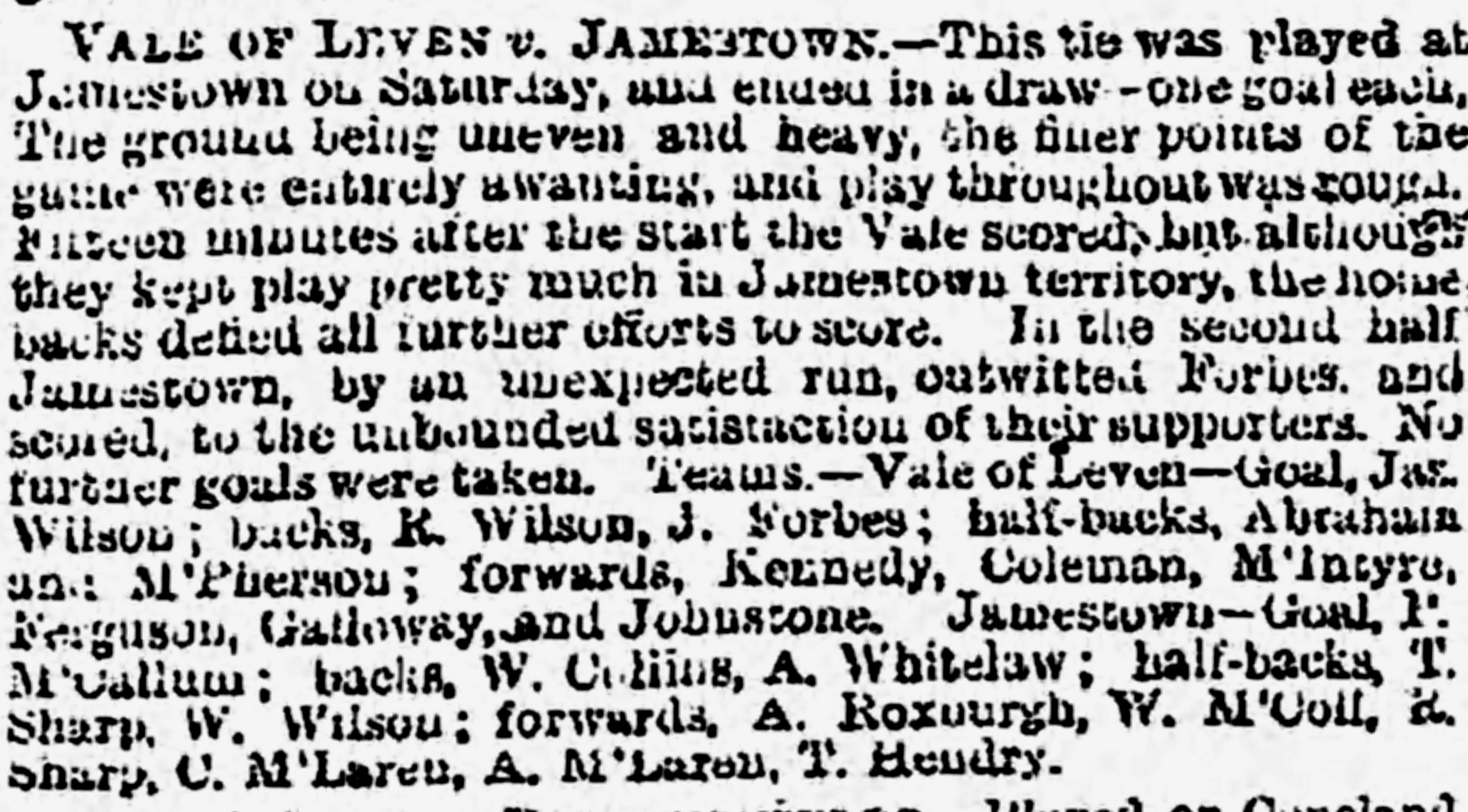
Jamestown v Vale of Leven, Scottish Cup 1884–85, from the Glasgow Herald, 15 September 1884

The club was founded in 1877 and the second to bear that name, the first Jamestown only playing in 1873. The club's first competition was the 1878–79 Scottish Cup, and the club surprisingly beat the veterans Lennox of Dumbarton in the first round. The club's first Cup run ended at the third round stage at Vale of Leven, the eventual winners, by the score of 15–0, although the club "worked so pluckily throughout" that "they deserved a less crushing defeat".

=== 1879–80 Scottish Cup disqualification ===
The club reached the third round 7 times, but never won through to the fourth. The next time the club made it so far was in 1879–80 Scottish Cup. That season, Vale of Leven lost in the first round to Dumbarton F.C.; those players who had not appeared in the match (and so were not Cup-tied) looked to join another side. One Vale player, Robert Paton, missed the match as he was acting as referee for Jamestown's 2–1 win over Star of Leven. Paton's performance was criticized for a number of questionable decisions. The Star protested the result on the basis that Paton was a member of the Jamestown club, but the protest was dismissed after Paton gave evidence that he was not a member.

By the third round, Jamestown was the only Levenside club remaining in the competition, and Paton (as well as three other Vale players) played for Jamestown in its third round win over Lennox. This however resulted in a protest from Lennox on the basis that the four players were not bona fide members of the Jamestown club. After the Scottish FA committee heard the evidence, it decided that Paton had indeed been a member of Jamestown. However, the committee also ruled that, contrary to its earlier findings, Paton had been a member of Jamestown before the competition started, and was therefore ineligible to referee the Star of Leven tie. The Scottish FA therefore disqualified Jamestown ab initio, retrospectively awarding the first round tie to Star of Leven. Jamestown threatened to take legal action but the disqualification was not overturned.

The links between Jamestown and Vale of Leven caused problems again in 1882–83, with Jamestown lending the Vale's second XI two players for its semi final in the Second XI Cup against Kilmarnock Athletic. However this link caused the Vale's disqualification from the tournament as the players were ineligible for a second XI competition.

=== Early 1880s: the Dunbartonshire region ===
The Scottish Cup in this era had its early rounds on a regional basis. This was unfortunate for the smaller Dunbartonshire sides, as every Cup final (except one) from 1876 to 1888 featured one of the three main Dunbartonshire clubs (Renton, Vale of Leven, and Dumbarton), all of whom were heavily backed by local factories; indeed Vale of Leven's backer was the Orr-Ewing factory, which was based in Jamestown.

This made it very difficult for the smaller sides to win through the Dunbartonshire region and Jamestown lost to Dumbarton in the Cup every year from 1880–81 to 1882–83. The club was at its peak in 1880, "having been strengthened by importations from other clubs", and in the Cup only narrowly lost 2–1 at Boghead. The following month Jamestown beat Vale of Leven away from home 3–1 in a friendly.

At this time, the Renton club was in abeyance, and, although it entered the Cup for 1881–82, it scratched to Jamestown in the first round. The next season however Renton re-started with factory backing and was re-established as one of the leading Scots clubs. Although Jamestown scored its biggest Scottish Cup win in 1882, beating Strathblane 12–1, Dumbarton was now able to beat Jamestown 8–1 in the third round.

From 1884 the club also started to enter the Dumbartonshire Cup, although, given the strength of the region, the club had even less success than in the Scottish Cup, never winning more than once in any tournament.

=== Late 1880s: further Scottish Cup protests ===
The club lost in the first round of the 1886–87 to Vale of Leven Wanderers 6–3, but the club protested on the basis that the Wanderers' John Cummings had not been properly registered; the Scottish FA upheld the protest and awarded the tie to Jamestown. The club lost in the third round 5–1 at Cambuslang Hibernian, the home team also having two goals disallowed.

At the end of the 1887–88 season, the club suffered a tragedy when one of its players, the forward Harry M'Culloch, drowned in the Leven. M'Culloch had been a member of the Jamestown rowing eight which had won the Loch Lomond regatta in 1887.

=== Enmity with Vale of Leven Hibernians ===
The club was involved in protests in relation to ties with the Vale of Leven Hibernians in the first round of both the 1887–88 Scottish Cup and the 1888–89 Scottish Cup. In the former year, after Jamestown won 3–2, the Hibs protested against Jamestown's rough play, alleging that the Hibs "had been treated more like beasts than human beings"; the result was the Scottish FA ordered a re-play in Alexandria and Jamestown's Hendry was suspended. The replay ended 2–2 and a second replay (also at Alexandria) on 24 September ended 3–1 to Jamestown.

Between 9 and 10pm that evening, the Jamestown umpire, Daniel Turner, having escorted the referee to Alexandria Station, was attacked by two of the Hibs team, who "brutally kicked" him and seriously injured his head. The following week, the two players, Michael Kilcoyne and Edward Redden, plus another club member, were put on trial; the defence was that Turner, who was "much the worse of liquor", had struck the first blow, and the three were acquitted. It was not the end of the matter; the next month the Scottish Football Association suspended two Hibernian players (Cannon and Connor) for a month, and the Hibs umpire M'Dowd for the season, on the basis that "the game...had more the appearance of a melee than a tie" and M'Dowd was "encouraging the players in ungentlemanly conduct".

In the latter year, Jamestown protested after losing 6–1, on the bizarre grounds that the team that has just beaten them was "not a club, and that they had not even eleven members". After the Hibs produced membership cards, the Scottish FA dismissed the protest as "the most absurd one that ever came before the Association", resulting in the Scottish FA admonishing Jamestown.

=== End of the club ===
The introduction of the Scottish League, of which Dumbarton, Vale of Leven, and nearby Renton were all members, was a devastating blow for the club. Unable to compete with their crowds, and with fewer opportunities for lucrative friendly matches, the club's last competitive match in the Dumbartonshire Cup was in 1891. It continued to enter the Scottish Cup after qualifying rounds were introduced, losing 8–2 at East Stirlingshire in the first round in 1891–92 - the Shire were 2–0 up while still playing with 10 men as one of its players had not turned up - but scratched from the competition in 1892–93 when drawn to face Laurieston. It did not enter again and its final recorded matches were in 1893. The role of football in the village was taken over by the amateur side Jamestown Athletic.

== Colours ==
The club's colours were navy shirts, white knickers, and black stockings for most of its existence. In 1888 the club changed to white jerseys and blue knickers, and from 1892 to black and white striped shirts with navy shorts.

== Ground ==
The club played at a private pitch on Balloch Road.
