= Dumbarton Athletic F.C. =

Association football club in Dunbartonshire, Scotland

Dumbarton Athletic
- Full name: Dumbarton Athletic Football Club
- Nickname(s): the Athletics, the D.A.F.C.
- Founded: 1881
- Dissolved: 8 August 1889
- Ground: St James' Park
- President: Archibald Little
1881–85 colours	1887–89 colours

Dumbarton Athletic Football Club was an association football club based in the town of Dumbarton, in Scotland.

== History ==
The club was founded in 1881. The club was a club of young players; club president (and right-winger) Archibald Little, a shipyard clerk, was still in his teens on foundation, and the club's star players, apprentice shipbuilder Alex Latta, and Geordie Dewar, were in their mid-teens when making their club debuts. Given another star player (James Coleman) was a ship's riveter, and that members of the Denny family had honorary positions on the club's committee, it is likely that the club's origin was in the Denny shipbuilding yard.

=== 1884–85: first competitive season ===
The Athletics were a fast-rising side and in 1884 entered the Scottish Cup for the first time. The club was not expected to beat King's Park in the second round (having had a bye in the first) but "surprised the most sanguine expectations of its friends" with a 3–1 victory. The club's first Cup run ended in the fifth round with a 4–1 home defeat to Cambuslang, the Athletics having one goal disallowed and having hit the bar with the game scoreless. The Athletics' protest that the Cambuslang goalkeeper was "not in uniform" was dismissed.

The same season, the club also entered the Dumbartonshire Cup for the first time, and reached the semi-final. The club lost 2–0 to Vale of Leven on the day, but amidst such controversy that the referee (Mr M'Houl of Renton) "was only got safely off the field by the timely intervention of the secretary of the Athletic Club". The Athletics protested on seven grounds, two of which were considered by the Dumbarton FA grounds; firstly, that the Vale had been awarded a goal which was palpably offside, but which the referee mistakenly allowed because he did not know that the offside law applied from a free-kick; secondly, that the Athletics had been wrongly denied a goal, when they scored a goal after a Vale foul, but the free-kick had not been awarded, therefore advantage should have applied. The Dumbartonshire FA agreed that one Vale goal should be chalked off, but, after four hours of discussion which was "not free of bitter feeling", the Athletics were not awarded their goal, on the basis that the Athletics umpire had appealed for the foul before the ball went into the goal, so the Vale was put through as 1–0 winners.

=== Scottish Cup entries ===
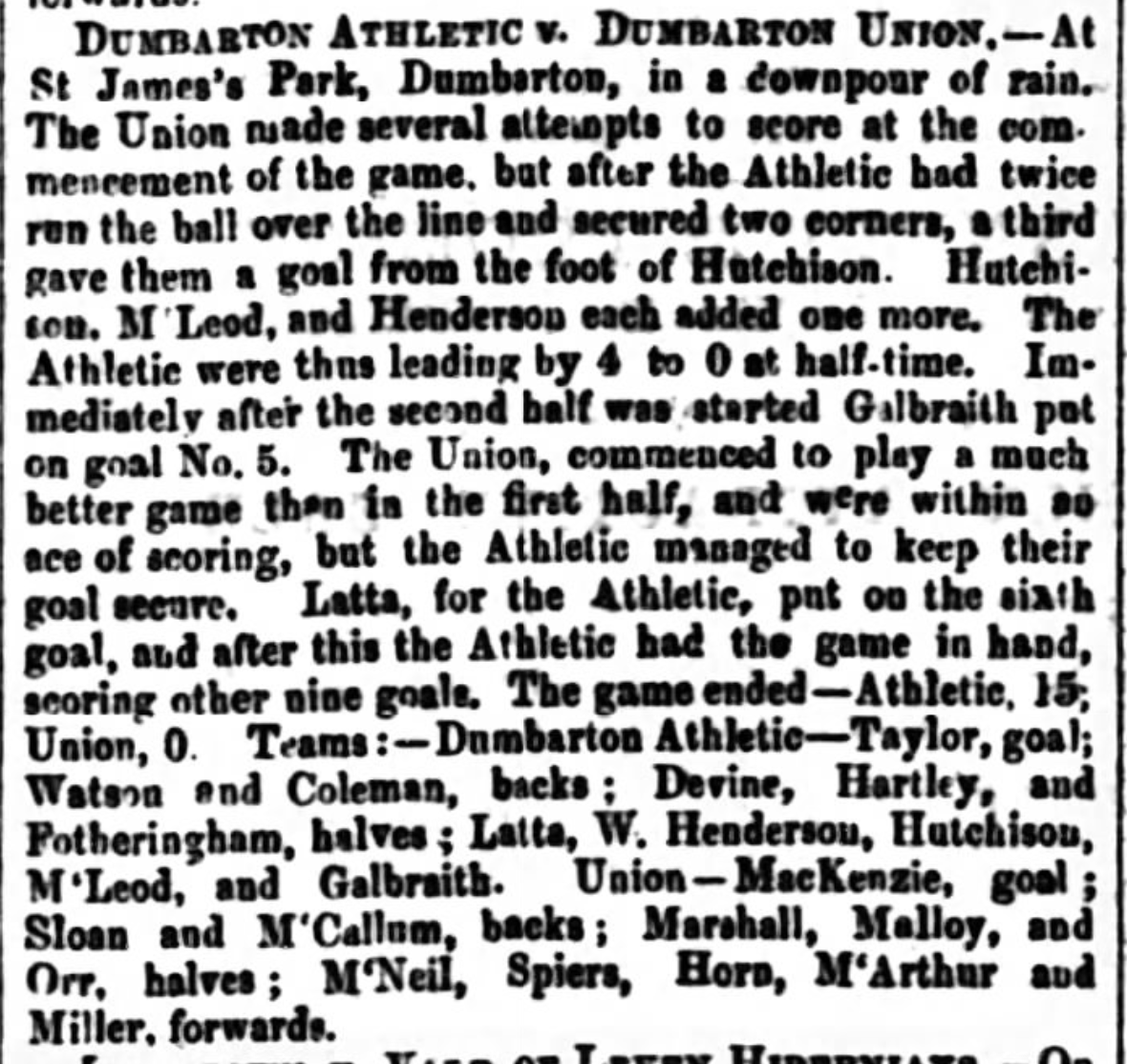
Report of Dumbarton Athletic's 15–0 win over Dumbarton Union, Scottish Cup 1888–89, from the Lennox Herald, 8 September 1888

The regional nature of the Scottish Cup draw was unfortunate for the Athletics, as every final from 1881 to 1888 featured one of the three main Dunbartonshire clubs (Renton, Vale of Leven, and Dumbarton), all of whom were heavily backed by local factories. The club entered the Scottish Cup four more times, and every time was knocked out by Renton. In 1887–88, the club protested against the Renton boots, which had bars rather than studs, and the ill-feeling as a result of this protest, which included allegations that the boots examined by the Scottish Football Association were not the same boots as used in the match, led to Renton cancelling all friendlies with the Athletics.

The club's best run in the competition was its final run, in 1888–89, in which it reached the quarter-finals; during this run, the club gained its biggest competitive win, 15–0 over Dumbarton Union, and its most prominent win, 4–2 over the Vale of Leven, in front of over 3,000 spectators at St James' Park. The tie with Renton - the Athletics' last-ever Cup match - was particularly hard lines; Lindsay, who started the match "wholly covered with bandages", went off injured after 15 minutes, but, despite playing with 10 men for most of the match, Athletics only lost 2–1, with the second Renton goal being an own goal.

=== Regional competition ===
The club at least could avoid Renton in the Dumbartonshire Cup, as the Dark Blues did not play in the competition for much of the 1880s owing to a dispute with the local FA. However, as the third best remaining side in the county, it still had to cope with the two bigger clubs. The club reached the final twice. In 1885–86, "the young Athletic" beat Dumbarton in the semi-final "to great surprise", and then were 5 minutes away from beating Vale of Leven in the final, until the Vale forced an equalizer from a scrimmage. The replay at Renton's Tontine Park attracted 4,000 spectators, but, despite having the better of the game, the Athletics went down 2–1.

The club's second final was in 1888–89, losing to Dumbarton 6–2 in a game noted for its good spirits. The Athletics also reached the final of the prestigious Dumbarton FA Tournament in 1886–87, held before the start of the season, again losing to Dumbarton.

The club did however win one competition of note; the Greenock Charity Cup, in 1887–88, beating St Mirren F.C. in the final. The club was prominent enough to be invited to take part in the 1888 Glasgow Exhibition Cup; its defeat to Celtic F.C. in the quarter-finals was Celtic's first competitive victory.

=== Takeover by Dumbarton ===
As professionalism entered the game more and more, the formation of the Football League was generating new opportunities for Scottish players, and the clubs in the bigger towns were attracting bigger crowds, it became apparent that Dumbarton was too small to support two clubs; in 1888 the Lennox Herald remarked that "surely Saturday's match will teach those wishing to uphold two first-class clubs in Dumbarton that the thing is utterly impossible. Football is being ruined in the burgh, and I think that the sooner some arrangement is come to, and a view to having representation by one good club, the better." Later in the year Bailie Denny, honorary president of Dumbarton, advised the clubs to "sink all differences...to bring honour to the town."

With only moral, rather than financial, support from the Dennys, the Athletics were in debt to the tune of £168; a mammoth sum in those days, higher than any player transfer fee until the mid-1890s. Discussions took place in secret between committee members of Dumbarton and the Athletics, and, on 8 August 1889, the Athletics committee unanimously agreed "to throw in their lot with their senior neighbours".

Although described as a takeover, it was more an absorption, as the "merged" club played at Dumbarton's Boghead, in Dumbarton's colours, with a first XI made up mostly of Dumbarton players, and with Dumbarton taking over the Athletics' debts. Although most Athletics players were expected to be transferred to Dumbarton, it did not work out as intended; when the post-Athletics Dumbarton club played its first game, at Kirkintilloch Athletic in August 1889, only one of the Athletics players turned out for the Sons - goalkeeper John M'Leod, who was having to play as full-back owing to the non-appearance of a defender. The best of the Athletics, Alex Latta, decided to eschew the new club and instead signed professional forms with Everton. This led to comments that Dumbarton, by taking on the Athletics' debts, had, in essence, paid £168 for one player. However, many of the Athletics players who did not find other clubs did join the Dumbarton organisation, making up most of the reserve side, which played under the name Dumbarton Rangers.

== Colours ==
The club played in the following colours:

Dumbarton Athletic colours
Seasons	Shirts	Shorts
1881–85	Navy & sky blue hoops	Navy
1885–87	One-inch black & white hoops	Navy
1887–89	Red & black vertical stripes	White

== Ground ==
The club's original ground was St James' Park on Glasgow Road. In 1885 to 1886, the club moved to Burnside Park, opening the ground with a 4–2 win over Yoker. From the 1887–88 season the club once more returned to St James' Park. However, the ground was not considered to be in the best condition, being described as a "slough of despond" and "part of the Lake District".

== Notable players ==
Alex Latta, capped for Scotland while with Dumbarton Athletic, and Geordie Dewar, later capped for Scotland and an FA Cup winner with Blackburn Rovers, both played for the club from 1884 at the latest. A. M. Marshall of Dumbarton Athletic won the Scottish 880 yard championship of 1888.
