= Dumbartonshire Cup =

Scottish football trophy

Dunbartonshire Cup
- Sport: Association football
- Founded: 1884
- Folded: 1940
- No. of teams: various from Dunbartonshire
- Country: Scotland
- Last champion: Dumbarton F.C. (20th title)
- Most titles: Dumbarton F.C. (20 titles)

The Dunbartonshire Cup was the championship trophy of the Dunbartonshire FA from its inception in 1884 until the organization disbanded in 1938. There was however an 'extra' playing of the competition in 1939, immediately after the outbreak of the Second World War, prior to the 'emergency' football leagues commencing.

At its height in the 1880s, the competition was only second in importance to the Scottish Cup because three of the top teams of the time - Dumbarton, Renton and Vale of Leven - took part.

== History ==
=== Key ===
Key to list of winners
*	Replay
†	Match played over two legs

=== Results ===
Dunbartonshire Cup Finals
Season	Winner	Score	Runners Up	Venue
1884–85	Dumbarton (1)	3–0	Vale of Leven	Tontine Park
1885–86	Vale of Leven (1)	2–1 *	Dumbarton Athletic	Tontine Park
1886–87	Renton (1)	5–0 *	Vale of Leven	Boghead Park
1887–88	Vale of Leven (2)	2–1	Renton	St James' Park, Dumbarton
1888–89	Dumbarton (2)	6–2	Dumbarton Athletic	Millburn Park
1889–90	Dumbarton (3)	2–0	Vale of Leven	Boghead Park
1890–91	Dumbarton (4)	4–1	Vale of Leven	Boghead Park
1891–92	Dumbarton (5)	2–0	Vale of Leven	Boghead Park
1892–93	Dumbarton (6)	7–1	Levendale	Tontine Park
1893–94	Dumbarton (7)	4–1	Duntocher Harp	Castle Grounds, Dalmuir
1894–95	Dumbarton (8)	2–1	Renton	Boghead Park
1895–96	Renton (2)	3–0	Dumbarton	Millburn Park
1896–97	Vale of Leven (3)	3–2	Dumbarton	Tontine Park
1897–98	Dumbarton (9)	3–2	Vale of Leven	Tontine Park
1898–99	Dumbarton (10)	6–3	Renton	Nillburn Park
1899–1900	Vale of Leven (4)	5–3	Renton	Boghead Park
1900–01	Vale of Leven (5)	2–1	Dumbarton	Tontine Park
1901–02	Vale of Leven (6)			
1902–03	No competition			
1903–04	No competition			
1904–05	Vale of Leven (7)	4–1	Renton	Millburn Park
1905–06	Vale of Leven (8)	1–0	Dumbarton	Tontine Park
1906–07	Vale of Leven (9)	2–0 *	Dumbarton	Tontine Park
1907–08	Renton (3)	2–0	Dumbarton	Millburn Park
1908–09	Renton (4)	1–0	Dumbarton	Millburn Park
1909–10	Dumbarton Harp (1)	2–1	Dumbarton	Tontine Park
1910–11	Vale of Leven (10)	1–1	Dumbarton Harp	Tontine Park
1911–12	Dumbarton Harp (2)	1–0 *	Renton	Millburn Park
1912–13	Dumbarton Harp (3)	1–0 *	Renton	Millburn Park
1913–14	Renton (5)	1–0 *	Dumbarton	Millburn Park
1914–15	Dumbarton (11)	4–3	Vale of Leven	Boghead Park
1915–16	Clydebank (1)	2–0	Vale of Leven	Boghead Park
1916–17	Clydebank (2)			
1917–18	Clydebank (3)	1–0	Dumbarton	Boghead Park
1918–19	Clydebank (4)	2–1	Dumbarton Harp	Clydeholm
1919–20	Clydebank (5)	5–1	Renton	Boghead Park
1920–21	Vale of Leven (11)	2–0	Clydebank	Boghead Park
1921–22	Dumbarton (12)	2–0	Dumbarton Harp	Boghead Park
1922–23	Dumbarton (13)	1–0	Dumbarton Harp	Boghead Park
1923–24	Clydebank (6)	3–2	Dumbarton Harp	Boghead Park
1924–25	Helensburgh (1)	1–0	Dumbarton	Boghead Park
1925–26	Helensburgh (2)	3-1	Dumbarton	Ardencaple Park
1926–27	Helensburgh (3)	6-0	Dumbarton	Clydeholm
1927–28	Clydebank (7)	4-2 *	Dumbarton	Clydeholm
1928–29	Clydebank (8)	1-0	Dumbarton	Clydeholm
1929–30	Dumbarton (14)	6-2	Clydebank	Boghead Park
1930–31	Dumbarton (15)	5-0	Clydebank	Boghead Park
1931–32	Dumbarton (16)	3-1	Vale Ocoba	Millburn Park
1932–33	Dumbarton (17)	2-0	Vale Ocoba	Boghead Park
1933–34	Vale Ocoba (1)	3-1	Dumbarton	Millburn Park
1934–35	Vale Ocoba (2}	7-4 †	Dumbarton	
1935–36	Dumbarton (18)	1-0	Vale Ocoba	Millburn Park
1936–37	Dumbarton (19)	2-0	Vale Ocoba	Boghead Park
1939–40	Dumbarton (20)	4–2	Vale of Leven	Boghead Park
