= 1891–92 Scottish Cup preliminary rounds =

Tournament details
- Country: Scotland
- Teams: 167

Tournament statistics
- Matches played: 147
- Goals scored: 976 (6.64 per match)

The preliminary rounds for the 1891–92 Scottish Cup took place between 5 September and 5 December 1891 to decide the 17 teams that would join the 15 exempt clubs in the first round. This was the first season to feature preliminary rounds following a change to the competition format from the previous 18 editions.

A total of 167 teams entered the preliminary rounds which were open to all members of the Scottish FA.

After the completion of the four preliminary rounds which saw 976 goals scored across 147 matches, Aberdeen, Arbroath, Annbank, Ayr, Battlefield, Bathgate Rovers, Bridge of Allan, Broxburn Shamrock, Cowlairs, Dunblane, East Stirlingshire, Kilmarnock Athletic, Linthouse, Mid-Annandale, Monkcastle, St Bernard's and Thistle advanced to the first round.

== Background ==
Following the creation of the Scottish Football Association (SFA) in 1873, membership swelled to 81 by 1876 and entrants to the Scottish Cup regularly exceeded 100 between 1877 and 1891. This, coupled with some heavily one-sided ties – including Arbroath's world-record 36–0 win against Bon Accord – prompted calls for a system of exemption for the leading clubs. The formation of the Scottish Football League in 1890 created a sea change and allowed the leading clubs to bring forward a change to the competition format. At the SFA's annual general meeting on 12 May 1891, Mr Kennedy of Dumbarton proposed that the Scottish Cup be split into two parts; a preliminary stage and a final stage. This would see 16 clubs given an exemption from competing in the preliminary stage while the rest of the competition entrants would play-off for the 16 remaining places in the first round of the final stage. The resulting vote came down to the chairman's casting vote and he sided in favour of introducing the preliminary stages.

== Format ==
Alongside the four semi-finalists from the previous season, 12 further teams were voted to be exempt from competing in the preliminary rounds. The names of the remaining clubs were placed into lots according to their districts and drawn into pairs. The home team would be the first team drawn unless only one of the clubs in a pair had a private ground. In the event of a draw, the second team drawn would have the choice of ground for the replay. This process was repeated for the second and third preliminary rounds. All competing clubs were placed into a single lot for the fourth preliminary round.

=== Calendar ===
1891–92 Scottish Cup preliminary rounds calendar
Round	Date	Ties			Clubs
Round	Date	Original	Byes	Replays	Clubs
First preliminary round	5 September 1891	81	5	9	167 → 86
Second preliminary round	26 September 1891	40	6	7	86 → 48 (Note: No team was eliminated in two ties which resulted in drawn replays and all four teams advanced.)
Third preliminary round	17 October 1891	23	2	3	48 → 25
Fourth preliminary round	7 November 1891	8	9	1	25 → 17

=== Teams ===
At a committee meeting on 11 June 1891, the 16 teams to be exempt from the preliminary rounds were decided. By virtue of being semi-finalists in 1890–91, Heart of Midlothian, 3rd Lanark RV, Dumbarton and Abercorn were the first to be exempt. Following a vote, Queen's Park, Rangers, Celtic, Renton, St Mirren, Vale of Leven, Clyde, Cambuslang, Dundee Our Boys, Kilmarnock, Northern and Leith Athletic were given an exemption from the preliminary rounds. However, Dundee Our Boys requested to take part in the preliminary rounds. Their request was granted and their place in the first round was vacated. As a result, 17 teams would qualify through the preliminary rounds rather than 16.

Competing teams arranged by district
Dunbartonshire, Stirlingshire and Clackmannanshire		East of Scotland and Fife	Forfarshire	Glasgow and Lanarkshire		Renfrewshire and Ayrshire	
Alloa Athletic; Alva; Bridge of Allan; Camelon; Campsie; Clackmannan; Clydebank; Clydebank Athletic; Dalmuir Thistle; Denny; Dunipace; Duntocher Harp; East Stirlingshire; Falkirk; Gairdoch; Grangemouth; Grasshoppers	Jamestown; Kilsyth Standard; Kilsyth Wanderers; King's Park; Kirkintilloch Athletic; Laurieston; Methlan Park; Old Kilpatrick; Slamannan; Slamannan Rovers; Smithstone Hibs; Stenhousemuir; Tillicoultry; Union; Vale of Bannock; Vale of Leven Wanderers	Adventurers; Armadale; Bathgate Rovers; Bo'ness; Bonnyrigg Rose Athletic; Broxburn; Broxburn Shamrock; Burntisland Thistle; Cowdenbeath; Dunfermline Athletic; Edinburgh University; Kirkcaldy Wanderers; Lassodie; Linlithgow Athletic; Lochgelly United; Mossend Swifts; Muirhouse Rovers; Penicuik Athletic; Polton Vale; Raith Rovers; St Bernard's	Arbroath; Brechin; Broughty; Dundee East End; Dundee Harp; Dundee Our Boys; Forfar Athletic; Johnstone Wanderers; Kirriemuir; Lochee United; Montrose; Strathmore	Airdrieonians; Albion Rovers; Battlefield; Burnbank Swifts; Cambuslang St Bride's; Carfin Hibernians; Carrington; Clydesdale; Cowlairs; Fairfield; Glasgow Wanderers; Glengowan; Hamilton Academical; Hamilton Harp; Kelvinside Athletic; Linthouse	Maryhill; Motherwell; Partick Thistle; Royal Albert; Rutherglen; Shettleston Swifts; Southern Athletic; Summerton Athletic; Thistle; Uddingston; United Abstainers; Whifflet Shamrock; Whitefield; Wishaw Thistle; 21st Royal Scots Fusiliers	Annbank; Arthurlie; Ayr; Ayr Athletic; Ayr Parkhouse; Beith; Bute Rangers; Cathcart; Catrine Thistle; Cronberry Eglinton; Dalry; Dykebar; Galston; Greenock Abstainers; Hurlford; Irvine; Johnstone	Kilbarchan; Kilbirnie; Kilmarnock Athletic; Lanemark; Lochwinnoch; Mauchline; Maybole; Monkcastle; Morton; Neilston; Newmilns; Pollokshaws; Port Glasgow Athletic; Saltcoats Victoria; Stevenston Thistle; Stewarton Cunninghame; 1st Argyll RV

Competing teams arranged by district
Aberdeenshire and Kincardineshire	Argyll	Northern Counties	Perthshire	Selkirkshire	Southern Counties
Aberdeen; Bon Accord; Caledonian; Orion; Stonehaven; Victoria United	Inveraray; Lochgilphead; Oban; Oban Rangers	Clachnacuddin; Fort William; Inverness Caledonian; Inverness Thistle; Inverness Union; Wick Rovers	Coupar Angus; Dunblane; Fair City Athletic; Our Boys; St Johnstone; Vale of Atholl; Vale of Ruthven	Selkirk; Vale of Gala	Annan; Douglas Rovers; Dumfries St John's; Mid-Annandale; Moffat; Newton Stewart; Newton Stewart Athletic; Queen of the South Wanderers; Rising Thistle; Stranraer; 5th Kirkcudbright RV

== First preliminary round ==
=== Glasgow and Lanarkshire district ===
Rutherglen received a bye to the second preliminary round.

Glasgow and Lanarkshire district first preliminary round results
Date	Home team	Score	Away team	Venue
5 September 1891	Burnbank Swifts	5–1	Hamilton Harp	Victoria Park, Hamilton
5 September 1891	Thistle	6–1	Shettleston Swifts	Beechwood Park, Glasgow
5 September 1891	Linthouse	12–0	Carfin Hibernians	Langlands Park, Govan
5 September 1891	Wishaw Thistle	7–3	Albion Rovers	Old Public Park, Wishaw
5 September 1891	Motherwell	1–4	Cowlairs	Dalziel Park, Motherwell
5 September 1891	Glasgow Wanderers	1–2	Partick Thistle	Eglinton Park, Govanhill
5 September 1891	Southern Athletic	1–6	Royal Albert	Moray Park, Strathbungo
5 September 1891	Hamilton Academical	2–4	21st Royal Scots Fusiliers	Douglas Park, Hamilton
5 September 1891	Clydesdale	2–2	Whitefield	Southcroft, Rutherglen
	Cambuslang St Bride's	w/o (Note: Cambuslang St Bride's scratched and Carrington advanced to the second preliminary round.)	Carrington	
	Kelvinside Athletic	w/o (Note: Uddingston scratched and Kelvinside Athletic advanced to the second preliminary round.)	Uddingston	
	Glengowan	w/o (Note: Summerton Athletic failed to appear for the tie on 5 September 1891 so Glengowan were granted a walkover to the second preliminary round.)	Summerton Athletic	
	Fairfield	w/o (Note: Fairfield scratched and Whifflet Shamrock advanced to the second preliminary round.)	Whifflet Shamrock	
	Battlefield	w/o (Note: United Abstainers scratched and Battlefield advanced to the second preliminary round.)	United Abstainers	
	Maryhill	w/o (Note: Maryhill scratched and Airdrieonians advanced to the second preliminary round.)	Airdrieonians	

Glasgow and Lanarkshire district first preliminary round replay
Date	Home team	Score	Away team	Venue
12 September 1891	Whitefield	7–0	Clydesdale	Whitefield Park, Govan

=== Renfrewshire and Ayrshire district ===
Renfrewshire and Ayrshire district first preliminary round results
Date	Home team	Score	Away team	Venue
5 September 1891	Port Glasgow Athletic	6–3	Lanemark	Clune Park, Port Glasgow
5 September 1891	Stevenston Thistle	5–2	Galston	Warner Park, Stevenston
5 September 1891	Cathcart	1–3	Ayr Athletic	Eglinton Park, Cathcart
5 September 1891	Johnstone	20–1	Greenock Abstainers	Cartland Bank, Johnstone
5 September 1891	Kilbarchan	10–0	10th Argyll RV	Overjohnstone Park, Kilbarchan
5 September 1891	Ayr	12–0	Pollockshaws	Somerset Park, Ayr
5 September 1891	Bute Rangers	3–4	Monkcastle	Meadowcap Park, Rothesay
5 September 1891	Beith	2–2	Arthurlie	Knockbuckle, Beith
5 September 1891	Newmilns	1–7	Dykebar	West End Park, Newmilns
5 September 1891	Cronberry Eglinton	2–4	Hurlford	Derrens Holm, Cronberry
5 September 1891	Saltcoats Victoria	6–3	Lochwinnoch	Brewery Park, Saltcoats
5 September 1891	Kilbirnie	2–2	Morton	Milton Park, Kilbirnie
5 September 1891	Stewarton Cunninghame	3–2	Irvine	Standalone Park, Stewarton
5 September 1891	Annbank	8–3	Ayr Parkhouse	Pebble Park, Annbank
5 September 1891	Neilston	3–6	Kilmarnock Athletic	Holehouse Park, Neilston
12 September 1891	Dalry	5–0	Catrine Thistle	Blairland Park, Dalry
	Mauchline	w/o (Note: Maybole scratched and Mauchline advanced to the second preliminary round.)	Maybole	

Renfrewshire and Ayrshire district first preliminary round replays
Date	Home team	Score	Away team	Venue
12 September 1891	Arthurlie	3–1	Beith	Dunterlie Park, Barrhead
12 September 1891	Morton	8–1	Kilbirnie	Cappielow, Greenock

=== Dunbartonshire, Stirlingshire and Clackmannanshire district ===
Clackmannan received a bye to the second preliminary round.

Dunbartonshire, Stirlingshire and Clackmannanshire district first preliminary round results
Date	Home team	Score	Away team	Venue
5 September 1891	Laurieston	2–4	Denny	Zetland Park, Laurieston
5 September 1891	Alva	1–0	Stenhousemuir	Craigleith Park, Alva
5 September 1891	Camelon	1–3	Dalmuir Thistle	Victoria Park, Camelon
5 September 1891	Campsie	7–3	Kilsyth Wanderers	Alum Works Park, Lennoxtown
5 September 1891	King's Park	5–3	Clydebank Athletic	Forthbank Park, Stirling
5 September 1891	Gairdoch	2–4	Grangemouth	Gairdoch Park, Carronshore
5 September 1891	Methlan Park	1–3	Slamannan Rovers	Upper Woodyard Park, Dumbarton
5 September 1891	Smithstone Hibs	6–3	Alloa Athletic	Haugh Park, Kilsyth
5 September 1891	Vale of Bannock	5–3	Slamannan	Viewvale Park, Bannockburn
5 September 1891	Kilsyth Standard	3–4	Dunipace	Balmalloch Park, Kilsyth
5 September 1891	East Stirlingshire	8–2	Jamestown	Merchiston Park, Bainsford
5 September 1891	Old Kilpatrick	0–3	Kirkintilloch Athletic	High Lusset Park, Old Kilpatrick
5 September 1891	Bridge of Allan	7–2	Union	Coneyhill Park, Bridge of Allan
5 September 1891	Clydebank	7–1	Grasshoppers	Hamilton Park, Clydebank
	Falkirk	w/o (Note: Tillicoultry scratched and Falkirk advanced to the second preliminary round.)	Tillicoultry	
	Vale of Leven Wanderers	w/o (Note: Vale of Leven Wanderers scratched and Duntocher Harp advanced to the second preliminary round.)	Duntocher Harp	

=== East of Scotland and Fife district ===
Edinburgh University received a bye to the third preliminary round.

East of Scotland and Fife district first preliminary round results
Date	Home team	Score	Away team	Venue
5 September 1891	Bonnyrigg Rose Athletic	1–6	Penicuik Athletic	Dundas Park, Bonnyrigg
5 September 1891	Lassodie	0–3	Cowdenbeath	Green Bank Park, Lassodie
5 September 1891	Kirkcaldy Wanderers	2–3	Polton Vale	Newtown Park, Kirkcaldy
5 September 1891	Armadale	3–3	Bathgate Rovers	Volunteer Park, Armadale
5 September 1891	Burntisland Thistle	4–6	Linlithgow Athletic	Lammerlaws Park, Burntisland
5 September 1891	Muirhouse Rovers	1–7	Mossend Swifts	Quality Road, Davidson's Mains
5 September 1891	Dunfermline Athletic	4–0	Bo'ness	East End Park, Dunfermline
5 September 1891	Broxburn	2–1	Raith Rovers	Albion Park, Broxburn
5 September 1891	Adventurers	0–5	St Bernard's	Gorgie Park, Edinburgh
	Broxburn Shamrock	w/o (Note: Lochgelly United scratched and Broxburn Shamrock advanced to the second preliminary round.)	Lochgelly United	

East of Scotland and Fife district first preliminary round replay
Date	Home team	Score	Away team	Venue
12 September 1891	Bathgate Rovers	3–0	Armadale	Boghead Park, Bathgate

=== Forfarshire district ===
Forfarshire district first preliminary round results
Date	Home team	Score	Away team	Venue
5 September 1891	Dundee Harp	4–4	Dundee Our Boys	East Dock Street, Dundee
5 September 1891	Broughty	3–3	Montrose	Forthill Park, Broughty Ferry
5 September 1891	Forfar Athletic	1–3	Dundee East End	Station Park, Forfar
5 September 1891	Arbroath	0–1 (abandoned) (Note: The Arbroath vs. Brechin match was abandoned after 87 due to crowd trouble. Following a protest by Arbroath, a replay was ordered.)	Brechin	Gayfield Park, Arbroath
5 September 1891	Lochee United	3–4	Johnstone Wanderers	South Park Road, Dundee
5 September 1891	Strathmore	3–7	Kirriemuir	Logie Park, Dundee

Forfarshire district first preliminary round replays
Date	Home team	Score	Away team	Venue
12 September 1891	Dundee Our Boys	0–2	Dundee Harp	West Craigie Park, Dundee
12 September 1891	Montrose	5–1	Broughty	Links Park, Montrose
19 September 1891	Brechin	3–9	Arbroath	Montrose Street Park, Brechin

=== Perthshire district ===
Vale of Atholl received a bye to the second preliminary round.

Perthshire district first preliminary round results
Date	Home team	Score	Away team	Venue
5 September 1891	Our Boys	0–5	Dunblane	Loonbrae, Blairgowrie
5 September 1891	St Johnstone	2–3	Fair City Athletic	Recreation Grounds, Perth
5 September 1891	Vale of Ruthven	1–6	Coupar Angus	Auchterarder Public School Park, Auchterarder

=== Argyll district ===
Argyll district first preliminary round results
Date	Home team	Score	Away team	Venue
5 September 1891	Inveraray	3–2	Oban	Winterton, Inveraray
	Oban Rangers	w/o (Note: Lochgilphead scratched and Oban Rangers advanced to the second preliminary round.)	Lochgilphead	

=== Aberdeenshire and Kincardineshire district ===
Aberdeenshire and Kincardineshire district first preliminary round results
Date	Home team	Score	Away team	Venue
5 September 1891	Victoria United	0–0	Orion	Recreation Grounds, Aberdeen
5 September 1891	Stonehaven	0–8	Bon Accord	Urie Ground, Stonehaven
	Aberdeen	w/o (Note: Caledonian scratched and Aberdeen advanced to the second preliminary round.)	Caledonian	

Aberdeenshire and Kincardineshire district first preliminary round replay
Date	Home team	Score	Away team	Venue
12 September 1891	Orion	5–1	Victoria United	Central Park, Aberdeen

=== Northern Counties ===
Northern Counties first preliminary round results
Date	Home team	Score	Away team	Venue
5 September 1891	Clachnacuddin	0–5	Inverness Caledonian	Grant Street Park, Inverness
	Fort William	w/o (Note: Inverness Union scratched and Fort William advanced to the second preliminary round.)	Inverness Union	
	Inverness Thistle	w/o (Note: Wick Rovers scratched and Inverness Thistle advanced to the second preliminary round.)	Wick Rovers	

=== Selkirkshire district ===
Selkirkshire district first preliminary round results
Date	Home team	Score	Away team	Venue
5 September 1891	Vale of Gala	3–4	Selkirk	Mossilee, Galashiels

=== Southern Counties ===
Moffat received a bye to the second preliminary round.

Southern Counties first preliminary round results
Date	Home team	Score	Away team	Venue
5 September 1891	Newton Stewart	2–2	Annan	Minniegaff, Newton Stewart
5 September 1891	Stranraer	2–3	5th Kirkcudbright RV	Westwood Park, Stranraer
5 September 1891	Mid-Annandale	5–4	Dumfries St John's	Livingstone Place Park, Lockerbie
5 September 1891	Queen of the South Wanderers	14–0	Douglas Rovers	Cresswell Park, Dumfries
	Newton Stewart Athletic	w/o (Note: Rising Thistle scratched and Newton Stewart Athletic advanced to the second preliminary round.)	Rising Thistle	

Southern Counties first preliminary round replay
Date	Home team	Score	Away team	Venue
	Annan	w/o (Note: Newton Stewart scratched and Annan advanced to the second preliminary round.)	Newton Stewart	

== Second preliminary round ==
=== East of Scotland, Fife, Dunbartonshire and Stirlingshire district ===
Cowdenbeath received a bye to the third preliminary round.

East of Scotland, Fife, Dunbartonshire and Stirlingshire district second preliminary round results
Date	Home team	Score	Away team	Venue
26 September 1891	Bridge of Allan	3–0	Clackmannan	Coneyhill Park, Bridge of Allan
26 September 1891	Alva	3–9	Mossend Swifts	Craigleith Park, Alva
26 September 1891	East Stirlingshire	3–0 (abandoned) (Note: The East Stirlingshire vs. King's Park match was abandoned after 42 minutes following a blizzard.)	King's Park	Merchiston Park, Bainsford
26 September 1891	Kirkintilloch Athletic	4–2	Polton Vale	Townhead Park, Kirkintilloch
26 September 1891	Denny	2–1	Dunfermline Athletic	Hill Park, Denny
26 September 1891	Penicuik Athletic	2–3	Dalmuir Thistle	Hays Park, Penicuik
26 September 1891	Vale of Bannock	0–7	Clydebank	Viewvale Park, Bannockburn
26 September 1891	St Bernard's	7–1	Dunipace	Logie Green, Edinburgh
26 September 1891	Smithstone Hibs	11–1	Linlithgow Athletic	Haugh Park, Kilsyth
26 September 1891	Broxburn Shamrock	6–4 (protested) (Note: A protest by Campsie was upheld and a replay was ordered.)	Campsie	Pyothall Road, Broxburn
26 September 1891	Grangemouth	0–2	Falkirk	Caledonian Park, Grangemouth
26 September 1891	Bathgate Rovers	8–1	Slamannan Rovers	Boghead Park, Bathgate
26 September 1891	Duntocher Harp	4–2	Broxburn	St Helena Park, Duntocher

East of Scotland, Fife, Dunbartonshire and Stirlingshire district second preliminary round replays
Date	Home team	Score	Away team	Venue
3 October 1891	East Stirlingshire	7–2	King's Park	Merchiston Park, Bainsford
10 October 1891	Broxburn Shamrock	3–1	Campsie	Pyothall Road, Broxburn

=== Glasgow, Lanarkshire, Renfrewshire and Ayrshire district ===
Saltcoats Victoria received a bye to the third preliminary round.

Glasgow, Lanarkshire, Renfrewshire and Ayrshire district second preliminary round results
Date	Home team	Score	Away team	Venue
26 September 1891	Annbank	4–0	Rutherglen	Pebble Park, Annbank
26 September 1891	Dalry	9–0	Stewarton Cunninghame	Blairland Park, Dalry
26 September 1891	Carrington	2–8	Burnbank Swifts	Hanover Park, Glasgow
26 September 1891	Partick Thistle	0–3	Hurlford	Inchview, Partick
26 September 1891	Wishaw Thistle	5–2	Arthurlie	Old Public Park, Wishaw
26 September 1891	Morton	3–1	Airdrieonians	Cappielow, Greenock
26 September 1891	Ayr	3–3	21st Royal Scots Fusiliers	Somerset Park, Ayr
26 September 1891	Royal Albert	6–6	Cowlairs	Raploch Park, Larkhall
26 September 1891	Dykebar	1–4	Mauchline	Thistle Park, Paisley
26 September 1891	Johnstone	4–7	Thistle	Cartland Bank, Johnstone
26 September 1891	Ayr Athletic	3–3	Kilbarchan	Athletic Park, Ayr
26 September 1891	Stevenston Thistle	3–3	Kilmarnock Athletic	Warner Park, Stevenston
26 September 1891	Battlefield	9–0	Whitefield	Mossfield Park, Langside
26 September 1891	Port Glasgow Athletic	4–1	Glengowan	Clune Park, Port Glasgow
	Kelvinside Athletic	w/o (Note: Kelvinside Athletic scratched and Monkcastle advanced to the third preliminary round.)	Monkcastle	
	Linthouse	w/o (Note: Whifflet Shamrock scratched and Linthouse advanced to the third preliminary round.)	Whifflet Shamrock	

Glasgow, Lanarkshire, Renfrewshire and Ayrshire district second preliminary round replays
Date	Home team	Score	Away team	Venue
3 October 1891	21st Royal Scots Fusiliers	1–2	Ayr	Kelburn Park, Glasgow
3 October 1891	Cowlairs	4–4 (Note: The four teams involved in drawn replays – Cowlairs, Royal Albert, Kilmarnock Athletic and Stevenston Thistle – advanced to the third preliminary round.)	Royal Albert	Gourlay Park, Glasgow
3 October 1891	Kilbarchan	4–1	Ayr Athletic	Overjohnstone Park, Kilbarchan
3 October 1891	Kilmarnock Athletic	2–2	Stevenston Thistle	Holm Quarry, Kilmarnock

=== Forfarshire and Perthshire district ===
Forfarshire and Perthshire district second preliminary round results
Date	Home team	Score	Away team	Venue
26 September 1891	Vale of Atholl	1–7	Dundee East End	Recreation Park, Pitlochry
26 September 1891	Arbroath	7–1	Fair City Athletic	Gayfield Park, Arbroath
26 September 1891	Dundee Harp	5–2	Johnstone Wanderers	East Dock Street, Dundee
26 September 1891	Coupar Angus	4–0	Montrose	Station Park, Coupar Angus
26 September 1891	Kirriemuir	1–8	Dunblane	Newton Park, Kirriemuir

=== Argyll district ===
Argyll district second preliminary round results
Date	Home team	Score	Away team	Venue
26 September 1891	Inveraray	4–2	Oban Rangers	Winterton, Inveraray

=== Aberdeenshire district ===
Orion received a bye to the third preliminary round.

Aberdeenshire district second preliminary round results
Date	Home team	Score	Away team	Venue
26 September 1891	Bon Accord	2–5	Aberdeen	Holburn Grounds, Aberdeen

=== Northern Counties ===
Inverness Caledonian received a bye to the third preliminary round.

Northern Counties second preliminary round results
Date	Home team	Score	Away team	Venue
	Inverness Thistle	w/o (Note: Fort William scratched and Inverness Thistle advanced to the third preliminary round.)	Fort William	

=== Southern Counties and Selkirkshire district ===
Annan received a bye to the third preliminary round.

Southern Counties and Selkirkshire district second preliminary round results
Date	Home team	Score	Away team	Venue
26 September 1891	Queen of the South Wanderers	6–1	Moffat	Cresswell Park, Dumfries
26 September 1891	Newton Stewart Athletic	1–1	Mid-Annandale	Holm Park, Newton Stewart
	5th Kirkcudbright RV	w/o (Note: Selkirk scratched and 5th Kirkcudbright RV advanced to the third preliminary round.)	Selkirk	

Southern Counties and Selkirkshire district second preliminary round replay
Date	Home team	Score	Away team	Venue
	Mid-Annandale	w/o (Note: Newton Stewart Athletic scratched and Mid-Annandale advanced to the third preliminary round.)	Newton Stewart Athletic	

== Third preliminary round ==
=== Glasgow, Lanarkshire, Renfrewshire, Ayrshire and Argyll district ===
Glasgow, Lanarkshire, Renfrewshire, Ayrshire and Argyll district third preliminary round results
Date	Home team	Score	Away team	Venue
17 October 1891	Saltcoats Victoria	1–7	Linthouse	Brewery Park, Saltcoats
17 October 1891	Monkcastle	4–2	Morton	Claremont Park, Kilwinning
17 October 1891	Cowlairs	5–0	Dalry	Gourlay Park, Glasgow
17 October 1891	Ayr	6–1	Inveraray	Somerset Park, Ayr
17 October 1891	Annbank	2–0	Hurlford	Pebble Park, Annbank
17 October 1891	Burnbank Swifts	5–0	Mauchline	Victoria Park, Hamilton
17 October 1891	Thistle	9–1	Kilbarchan	Beechwood Park, Glasgow
17 October 1891	Kilmarnock Athletic	5–4	Port Glasgow Athletic	Holm Quarry, Kilmarnock
17 October 1891	Wishaw Thistle	3–2	Royal Albert	Old Public Park, Wishaw
17 October 1891	Battlefield	4–2	Stevenston Thistle	Mossfield Park, Langside

=== Dunbartonshire, Fife, Stirlingshire and East of Scotland district ===
Dalmuir Thistle received a bye to the fourth preliminary round.

Dunbartonshire, Fife, Stirlingshire and East of Scotland district third preliminary round results
Date	Home team	Score	Away team	Venue
17 October 1891	Cowdenbeath	0–3	Clydebank	North End Park, Cowdenbeath
17 October 1891	Denny	6–1	Edinburgh University	Hill Park, Denny
17 October 1891	Bridge of Allan	4–2	Duntocher Harp	Coneyhill Park, Bridge of Allan
17 October 1891	St Bernard's	5–1	Kirkintilloch Athletic	Logie Green, Edinburgh
17 October 1891	Bathgate Rovers	5–5	Falkirk	Boghead Park, Bathgate
17 October 1891	East Stirlingshire	5–4	Mossend Swifts	Merchiston Park, Bainsford
17 October 1891	Smithstone Hibs	1–2	Broxburn Shamrock	Haugh Park, Kilsyth

Dunbartonshire, Fife, Stirlingshire and East of Scotland district third preliminary round replay
Date	Home team	Score	Away team	Venue
24 October 1891	Falkirk	0–3	Bathgate Rovers	Brockville Park, Falkirk

=== Forfarshire and Perthshire district ===
Arbroath received a bye to the fourth preliminary round.

Forfarshire and Perthshire district third preliminary round results
Date	Home team	Score	Away team	Venue
17 October 1891	Dundee Harp	1–1	Dundee East End	East Dock Street, Dundee
17 October 1891	Coupar Angus	3–3	Dunblane	Station Park, Coupar Angus

Forfarshire and Perthshire district third preliminary round replays
Date	Home team	Score	Away team	Venue
24 October 1891	Dundee East End	2–0	Dundee Harp	Carolina Port, Dundee
	Dunblane	w/o (Note: Coupar Angus scratched and Dunblane advanced to the fourth preliminary round.)	Coupar Angus	

=== Aberdeenshire district ===
Aberdeenshire district third preliminary round results
Date	Home team	Score	Away team	Venue
17 October 1891	Orion	1–3	Aberdeen	Central Park, Aberdeen

=== Northern Counties ===
Northern Counties third preliminary round results
Date	Home team	Score	Away team	Venue
17 October 1891	Inverness Thistle	2–1	Inverness Caledonian	Kingsmills Park, Inverness

=== Southern Counties ===
Southern Counties third preliminary round results
Date	Home team	Score	Away team	Venue
17 October 1891	Queen of the South Wanderers	4–7	5th Kirkcudbright RV	Cresswell Park, Dumfries
	Mid-Annandale	w/o (Note: Annan scratched and Mid-Annandale advanced to the fourth preliminary round.)	Annan	

== Fourth preliminary round ==
Linthouse, Ayr, Bridge of Allan, East Stirlingshire, Mid-Annandale, Dunblane, Broxburn Shamrock, St Bernard's and Kilmarnock Athletic received a bye to the first round.

Fourth preliminary round results
Date	Home team	Score	Away team	Venue
7 November 1891	Aberdeen	2–1	Dalmuir Thistle	Chanonry Grounds, Aberdeen
7 November 1891	Arbroath	10–0	Denny	Gayfield Park, Arbroath
7 November 1891	Annbank	8–2	Wishaw Thistle	Pebble Park, Annbank
7 November 1891	Inverness Thistle	0–1	Battlefield	Neutral venue, Pitlochry (Note: Played at an unknown neutral venue in Pitlochry.)
7 November 1891	Bathgate Rovers	5–1	Clydebank	Boghead Park, Bathgate
7 November 1891	Dundee East End	3–6	Monkcastle	Forthbank Park, Stirling (Note: Match played at a neutral venue.)
7 November 1891	Thistle	5–2	Burnbank Swifts	Beechwood Park, Glasgow
7 November 1891	Cowlairs	9–3 (protested) (Note: A protest by 5th Kirkcudbright RV was upheld and a replay was ordered.)	5th Kirkcudbright RV	Gourlay Park, Glasgow

Fourth preliminary round replay
Date	Home team	Score	Away team	Venue
5 December 1891	Cowlairs	7–3	5th Kirkcudbright RV	Gourlay Park, Glasgow
