= 1893–94 Scottish Cup preliminary rounds =

Tournament details
- Country: Scotland
- Teams: 162

Tournament statistics
- Matches played: 131
- Goals scored: 811 (6.19 per match)

The preliminary rounds for the 1893–94 Scottish Cup took place between 30 August and 11 November 1893 to decide the 16 teams that would join the 16 exempt clubs in the first round.

A total of 162 teams entered the preliminary rounds which were open to all members of the Scottish FA.

After the completion of the four preliminary rounds which saw 811 goals scored across 131 matches, Airdrieonians, Albion Rovers, Arbroath, Battlefield, Black Watch, Cambuslang, Cowlairs, East Stirlingshire, Grangemouth, Hurlford, Inverness Thistle, Kilmarnock, Orion, Port Glasgow Athletic, Vale of Leven and 5th Kirkcudbright RV advanced to the first round.

== Format ==
Alongside the four semi-finalists from the previous season, 12 further teams were voted to be exempt from competing in the preliminary rounds. The names of the remaining clubs were placed into lots according to their districts and drawn into pairs. The home team would be the first team drawn unless only one of the clubs in a pair had a private ground. In the event of a draw, the second team drawn would have the choice of ground for the replay. This process was repeated for the second and third preliminary rounds. All competing clubs were placed into a single lot for the fourth preliminary round.

=== Calendar ===
1893–94 Scottish Cup preliminary rounds calendar
Round	Date	Ties			Clubs
Round	Date	Original	Byes	Replays	Clubs
First preliminary round	2 September 1893	79	4	6	162 → 83
Second preliminary round	23 September 1893	40	3	7	83 → 43
Third preliminary round	14 October 1893	19	5	9	43 → 26 (Note: No team was eliminated in two ties which resulted in drawn replays and all four teams advanced.)
Fourth preliminary round	4 November 1893	10	6	3	26 → 16

=== Teams ===
At a committee meeting on 30 May 1893, the 16 teams to be exempt from the preliminary rounds were decided. By virtue of being semi-finalists in 1892–93, Broxburn Shamrock, Celtic, Queen's Park and St Bernard's were the first to be exempt. Following a vote, Dumbarton, Renton, Rangers, Heart of Midlothian, St Mirren, Thistle, King's Park, Abercorn, Leith Athletic, 3rd Lanark RV, Linthouse and Clyde were given an exemption from the preliminary rounds.

Competing teams arranged by district
Dunbartonshire, Stirlingshire and Clackmannanshire		East of Scotland and Fife	Forfarshire	Glasgow and Lanarkshire		Renfrewshire and Ayrshire	
Alloa Athletic; Alva; Bridge of Allan; Camelon; Campsie; Clackmannan; Clydebank; Dalmuir Thistle; Denny; Dunipace; Duntocher Harp; East Stirlingshire; Falkirk; Gairdoch; Grangemouth	Grasshoppers; Kilsyth Hibernians; Kilsyth Wanderers; Kirkintilloch Athletic; Laurieston; Levendale; Methlan Park; Slamannan; Slamannan Rovers; Stenhousemuir; Union; Vale of Bannock; Vale of Leven; Vale of Leven Wanderers	Adventurers; Argyll and Sutherland Highlanders; Armadale; Bathgate; Bo'ness; Bonnyrigg Rose Athletic; Broxburn; Cowdenbeath; Dunfermline Athletic; Edinburgh University; Hibernian; Kirkcaldy; Linlithgow Athletic; Lochgelly United; Mossend Swifts; Muirhouse Rovers; Penicuik Athletic; Polton Vale; Raith Rovers; Selkirk; Uphall; Vale of Gala	Arbroath; Arbroath Wanderers; Brechin; Dundee (Note: Dundee were formed when Dundee East End and Dundee Our Boys merged before applying to join the Scottish Football League. The two amalgamated clubs were erroneously entered into the competition along with the newly formed Dundee.); Dundee East End; Dundee Harp; Dundee Our Boys; Forfar Athletic; Johnstone Wanderers; Kirriemuir; Lochee United; Montrose; Strathmore	Airdriehill; Airdrieonians; Albion Rovers; Battlefield; Black Watch; Burnbank Swifts; Cambuslang; Carfin Hibernians; Carfin Shamrock; Carrington; Cowlairs; Dykehead; Fairfield; Glasgow Wanderers; Glengowan	Hamilton Academical; Hamilton Harp; Kelvinside Athletic; Maryhill; Motherwell; Northern; Partick Thistle; Royal Albert; Shettleston Swifts; Southern Athletic; United Abstainers; Whifflet Shamrock; Whitefield; Wishaw Thistle; 4th VB Scottish Rifles	Annbank; Arthurlie; Ayr; Ayr Parkhouse; Beith; Bridge of Weir; Bute Rangers; Cartvale; Cathcart Volunteers; Cronberry Eglinton; Cumnock Springbank; Dalry; Dykebar; Galston; Girvan Athletic; Hurlford; Irvine; Johnstone; Kilbarchan	Kilbirnie; Kilmarnock; Kilmarnock Athletic; Kilwinning Eglinton; Lanemark; Lochwinnoch; Mauchline; Monkcastle; Morton; Neilston; Newmilns; Paisley Academicals; Paisley Celtic; Pollokshaws; Port Glasgow Athletic; Saltcoats Victoria; Stevenston Thistle; Thornliebank; 1st Argyll RV

Competing teams arranged by district
Aberdeenshire	Argyll	Dumfriesshire	Northern Counties	Perthshire
Aberdeen; Fraserburgh Wanderers; Hawthorn; Orion; Peterhead; Victoria United	Dunach; Fort William; Inveraray; Oban Rangers	Annan; Barholm Rovers; Douglas Rovers; Moffat; Newton Stewart Athletic; Queen of the South Wanderers; St Cuthbert Wanderers; Thistle; 5th Kirkcudbright RV; 6th Galloway RV	Clachnacuddin; Inverness Caledonian; Inverness Thistle; Inverness Union	Dunblane; Fair City Athletic; Our Boys; St Johnstone; Vale of Atholl; Vale of Ruthven

== First preliminary round ==
=== Glasgow and Lanarkshire district ===
Glasgow and Lanarkshire district first preliminary round results
Date	Home team	Score	Away team	Venue
2 September 1893	Shettleston Swifts	1–3	4th VB Scottish Rifles	Cyprus Park, Shettleston
2 September 1893	Airdriehill	0–5	Motherwell	New Monkland, Airdrie
2 September 1893	Northern	0–3	Wishaw Thistle	Hyde Park, Glasgow
2 September 1893	Partick Thistle	3–3	Airdrieonians	Inchview, Partick
2 September 1893	Cambuslang	6–1	Carrington	Whitefield Park, Cambuslang
2 September 1893	Glengowan	2–3	Burnbank Swifts	Dumbreck Park, Caldercruix
2 September 1893	Glasgow Wanderers	0–2	Dykehead	Eglinton Park, Glasgow
2 September 1893	Cowlairs	11–1	Carfin Hibernians	Gourlay Park, Glasgow
	Southern Athletic	w/o (Note: Southern Athletic scratched and Black Watch advanced to the second preliminary round.)	Black Watch	
	Maryhill	w/o (Note: Maryhill scratched and Royal Albert advanced to the second preliminary round.)	Royal Albert	
	Kelvinside Athletic	w/o (Note: Kelvinside Athletic scratched and Hamilton Academical advanced to the second preliminary round.)	Hamilton Academical	
	Whitefield	w/o (Note: Whitefield scratched and Albion Rovers advanced to the second preliminary round.)	Albion Rovers	
	Hamilton Harp	w/o (Note: Fairfield scratched and Hamilton Harp advanced to the second preliminary round.)	Fairfield	
	Carfin Shamrock	w/o (Note: Whifflet Shamrock scratched and Carfin Shamrock advanced to the second preliminary round.)	Whifflet Shamrock	
	Battlefield	w/o (Note: United Abstainers scratched and Battlefield advanced to the second preliminary round.)	United Abstainers	

Glasgow and Lanarkshire district first preliminary round replay
Date	Home team	Score	Away team	Venue
9 September 1893	Airdrieonians	3–1	Partick Thistle	Broomfield Park, Airdrie

=== Renfrewshire and Ayrshire district ===
Renfrewshire and Ayrshire district first preliminary round results
Date	Home team	Score	Away team	Venue
2 September 1893	Bute Rangers	3–4	Neilston	Meadowcap Park, Rothesay
2 September 1893	Hurlford	3–3	Kilbirnie	Station Park, Hurlford
2 September 1893	Lochwinnoch	2–5	Cronberry Eglinton	Field Park, Lochwinnoch
2 September 1893	Galston	4–0	Kilwinning Eglinton	Portland Park, Galston
2 September 1893	Beith	4–3	Kilbarchan	Knockbuckle Park, Beith
2 September 1893	Newmilns	12–2	Cumnock Springbank	West End Park, Newmilns
2 September 1893	Ayr	4–2	Ayr Parkhouse	Somerset Park, Ayr
2 September 1893	Paisley Celtic	4–1	Dykebar	Celtic Park, Paisley
2 September 1893	Girvan Athletic	Not played (Note: After receiving no communication from Pollokshaws before the tie, Girvan Athletic assumed they would be granted a walkover and organised a friendly in Maybole. However, Pollokshaws turned up for the tie as scheduled. A replay was subsequently ordered at Pollokshaws.)	Pollokshaws	Hamilton Park, Girvan
2 September 1893	Johnstone	3–2	Kilmarnock Athletic	Cartland Bank, Johnstone
2 September 1893	Lanemark	3–3	Cathcart Volunteers	Connel Park, New Cumnock
2 September 1893	Cartvale	6–0	1st Argyll RV	Cartsbridge Park, Busby
2 September 1893	Kilmarnock	5–3	Morton	Rugby Park, Kilmarnock
2 September 1893	Stevenston Thistle	5–3	Thornliebank	Warner Park, Stevenston
2 September 1893	Saltcoats Victoria	5–3	Arthurlie	Brewery Park, Saltcoats
2 September 1893	Irvine	5–2	Dalry	Cochrane Park, Irvine
	Port Glasgow Athletic	w/o (Note: Bridge of Weir scratched and Port Glasgow Athletic advanced to the second preliminary round.)	Bridge of Weir	
	Paisley Academicals	w/o (Note: Paisley Academicals scratched and Annbank advanced to the second preliminary round.)	Annbank	
	Monkcastle	w/o (Note: Mauchline scratched and Monkcastle advanced to the second preliminary round.)	Mauchline	

Renfrewshire and Ayrshire district first preliminary round replays
Date	Home team	Score	Away team	Venue
9 September 1893	Kilbirnie	2–3	Hurlford	Milton Park, Kilbirnie
9 September 1893	Cathcart Volunteers	3–4	Lanemark	Hazelwood Park, Cathcart
	Pollokshaws	w/o (Note: Girvan Athletic scratched and Pollokshaws advanced to the second preliminary round.)	Girvan Athletic	

=== East of Scotland and Fife district ===
Broxburn and Edinburgh University received a bye to the second preliminary round.

East of Scotland and Fife district first preliminary round results
Date	Home team	Score	Away team	Venue
2 September 1893	Selkirk	8–0	Vale of Gala	Linglie Park, Selkirk
2 September 1893	Cowdenbeath	1–2	Hibernian	North End Park, Cowdenbeath
2 September 1893	Armadale	8–1	Argyll and Sutherland Highlanders	Volunteer Park, Armadale
2 September 1893	Uphall	2–5	Polton Vale	Crossgreen Park, Uphall
2 September 1893	Mossend Swifts	9–0	Adventurers	Mossend Park, West Calder
2 September 1893	Bathgate	0–0	Kirkcaldy	Boghead Park, Bathgate
2 September 1893	Muirhouse Rovers	6–2	Penicuik Athletic	Quality Road, Davidson's Mains
2 September 1893	Raith Rovers	8–0	Dunfermline Athletic	Stark's Park, Kirkcaldy
2 September 1893	Bonnyrigg Rose Athletic	4–3	Bo'ness	Dundas Park, Bonnyrigg
	Lochgelly United	w/o (Note: Linlithgow Athletic scratched and Lochgelly United advanced to the second preliminary round.)	Linlithgow Athletic	

East of Scotland and Fife district first preliminary round replay
Date	Home team	Score	Away team	Venue
9 September 1893	Kirkcaldy	3–2	Bathgate	Newtown Park, Kirkcaldy

=== Dunbartonshire, Stirlingshire and Clackmannanshire district ===
Dunbartonshire, Stirlingshire and Clackmannanshire district first preliminary round results
Date	Home team	Score	Away team	Venue
2 September 1893	Kirkintilloch Athletic	0–2	Slamannan Rovers	Townhead Park, Kirkintilloch
2 September 1893	Denny	8–0	Bridge of Allan	Hill Park, Denny
2 September 1893	Kilsyth Hibernians	2–3	Vale of Leven	Haugh Park, Kilsyth
2 September 1893	Kilsyth Wanderers	5–1	Dunipace	Garrel Garden, Kilsyth
2 September 1893	Gairdoch	3–2	Stenhousemuir	Main Street, Carronshore
2 September 1893	Dalmuir Thistle	2–1	Slamannan	Castle Park, Dalmuir
2 September 1893	Grangemouth	4–0	Grasshoppers	Caledonian Park, Grangemouth
2 September 1893	East Stirlingshire	8–1	Alva	Merchiston Park, Bainsford
	Duntocher Harp	w/o (Note: Union scratched and Duntocher Harp advanced to the second preliminary round.)	Union	
	Campsie	w/o (Note: Campsie scratched and Camelon advanced to the second preliminary round.)	Camelon	
	Falkirk	w/o (Note: Clydebank scratched and Falkirk advanced to the second preliminary round.)	Clydebank	
	Vale of Leven Wanderers	w/o (Note: Vale of Leven Wanderers scratched and Clackmannan advanced to the second preliminary round.)	Clackmannan	
	Laurieston	w/o (Note: Vale of Bannock scratched and Laurieston advanced to the second preliminary round.)	Vale of Bannock	
	Levendale	w/o (Note: Levendale scratched and Methlan Park advanced to the second preliminary round.)	Methlan Park	

=== Forfarshire district ===
Despite having merged with Dundee East End to form Dundee, Dundee Our Boys were erroneously included in the draw and received a bye to the second preliminary round.

Fifeshire district first preliminary round results
Date	Home team	Score	Away team	Venue
30 August 1893	Brechin	4–6	Dundee Harp	Montrose Street Park, Brechin
2 September 1893	Forfar Athletic	1–6	Strathmore	Station Park, Forfar
2 September 1893	Arbroath	7–1	Arbroath Wanderers	Gayfield Park, Arbroath
2 September 1893	Johnstone Wanderers	6–2	Lochee United	Clepington Park, Dundee
2 September 1893	Kirriemuir	2–3	Montrose	Newton Park, Kirriemuir
	Dundee	w/o (Note: Dundee East End amalgamated with Dundee Our Boys to form Dundee but were erroneously included in the draw. Dundee received a walkover and advanced to the second preliminary round.)	Dundee East End	

=== Aberdeenshire district ===
Aberdeenshire district first preliminary round results
Date	Home team	Score	Away team	Venue
2 September 1893	Orion	9–1	Hawthorn	Cattofield, Aberdeen
2 September 1893	Aberdeen	11–1	Fraserburgh Wanderers	Chanonry Grounds, Aberdeen
2 September 1893	Peterhead	2–3	Victoria United	Recreation Park, Peterhead

=== Northern Counties ===
Northern Counties first preliminary round results
Date	Home team	Score	Away team	Venue
2 September 1893	Clachnacuddin	3–1	Inverness Union	Grant Street Park, Inverness
2 September 1893	Inverness Thistle	6–2	Inverness Caledonian	Kingsmills Park, Inverness

=== Perthshire district ===
Perthshire district first preliminary round results
Date	Home team	Score	Away team	Venue
2 September 1893	Dunblane	4–4	St Johnstone	Duckburn Park, Dunblane
2 September 1893	Fair City Athletic	5–0	Vale of Atholl	Balhousie Park, Perth
2 September 1893	Vale of Ruthven	1–7	Our Boys	School Park, Auchterarder

Perthshire district first preliminary round replay
Date	Home team	Score	Away team	Venue
9 September 1893	St Johnstone	3–5	Dunblane	Recreation Grounds, Perth

=== Argyll district ===
Argyll district first preliminary round results
Date	Home team	Score	Away team	Venue
2 September 1893	Oban Rangers	1–4	Dunach	Mossfield Park, Oban
	Inveraray	w/o (Note: Fort William scratched and Inveraray advanced to the second preliminary round.)	Fort William	

=== Dumfriesshire district ===
Dumfriesshire district first preliminary round results
Date	Home team	Score	Away team	Venue
2 September 1893	Newton Stewart Athletic	2–3	Queen of the South Wanderers	Holm Park, Newton Stewart
2 September 1893	Thistle	0–9	5th Kirkcudbright RV	Innerfield Park, Lochmaben
	6th Galloway RV	w/o (Note: 6th Galloway RV scratched and St Cuthbert Wanderers advanced to the second preliminary round.)	St Cuthbert Wanderers	
	Annan	w/o (Note: Douglas Rovers scratched and Annan advanced to the second preliminary round.)	Douglas Rovers	
	Moffat	w/o (Note: Barholm Rovers scratched and Moffat advanced to the second preliminary round.)	Barholm Rovers	

== Second preliminary round ==
=== Glasgow, Lanarkshire, Renfrewshire and Ayrshire district ===
Glasgow, Lanarkshire, Renfrewshire and Ayrshire district second preliminary round results
Date	Home team	Score	Away team	Venue
23 September 1893	Saltcoats Victoria	6–2	Royal Albert	Brewery Park, Saltcoats
23 September 1893	Motherwell	6–1	Burnbank Swifts	Dalziel Park, Motherwell
23 September 1893	Hamilton Academical	1–7	Airdrieonians	Douglas Park, Hamilton
23 September 1893	Beith	1–3	Hurlford	Knockbuckle Park, Beith
23 September 1893	Kilmarnock	1–0	Newmilns	Rugby Park, Kilmarnock
23 September 1893	Cambuslang	4–3	Paisley Celtic	Whitefield Park, Cambuslang
23 September 1893	Hamilton Harp	2–3	Black Watch	West End Park, Hamilton
23 September 1893	Neilston	5–3	Stevenston Thistle	Holehouse Park, Neilston
23 September 1893	Cowlairs	5–1	4th VB Scottish Rifles	Gourlay Park, Glasgow
23 September 1893	Battlefield	4–3	Wishaw Thistle	Mossfield Park, Glasgow
23 September 1893	Albion Rovers	5–1	Dykehead	Meadow Park, Coatbridge
23 September 1893	Galston	3–0	Irvine	Portland Park, Galston
23 September 1893	Cartvale	4–2	Annbank	Cartsbridge Park, Busby
23 September 1893	Ayr	0–1	Johnstone	Somerset Park, Ayr
	Port Glasgow Athletic	w/o (Note: Pollokshaws scratched and Port Glasgow Athletic advanced to the third preliminary round.)	Pollokshaws	
	Cronberry Eglinton	w/o (Note: Monkcastle scratched and Cronberry Eglinton advanced to the third preliminary round.)	Monkcastle	
	Carfin Shamrock	w/o (Note: Carfin Shamrock scratched and Lanemark advanced to the third preliminary round.)	Lanemark	

=== East of Scotland, Fife, Dunbartonshire, Stirlingshire and Clackmannanshire district ===
Edinburgh University received a bye to the third preliminary round.

East of Scotland, Fife, Dunbartonshire, Stirlingshire and Clackmannanshire district second preliminary round results
Date	Home team	Score	Away team	Venue
23 September 1893	Alloa Athletic	6–2	Bonnyrigg Rose Athletic	Bellvue Park, Alloa
23 September 1893	Hibernian	5–0	Broxburn	Easter Road, Edinburgh
23 September 1893	Denny	3–3	Vale of Leven	Hill Park, Denny
23 September 1893	Laurieston	1–12	Falkirk	Zetland Park, Laurieston
23 September 1893	Slamannan Rovers	5–0	Muirhouse Rovers	Glebe, Slamannan
23 September 1893	Dalmuir Thistle	0–2	East Stirlingshire	Castle Park, Dalmuir
23 September 1893	Raith Rovers	2–3	Gairdoch	Stark's Park, Kirkcaldy
23 September 1893	Grangemouth	6–2	Armadale	Caledonian Park, Grangemouth
23 September 1893	Camelon	3–5	Kirkcaldy	Victoria Park, Camelon
23 September 1893	Duntocher Harp	2–5	Mossend Swifts	St Helena Park, Duntocher
	Kilsyth Wanderers	w/o (Note: Methlan Park scratched and Kilsyth Wanderers advanced to the third preliminary round.)	Methlan Park	
	Polton Vale	w/o (Note: Clackmannan scratched and Polton Vale advanced to the third preliminary round.)	Clackmannan	
	Lochgelly United	w/o (Note: Selkirk scratched and Lochgelly United advanced to the third preliminary round.)	Selkirk	

East of Scotland, Fife, Dunbartonshire, Stirlingshire and Clackmannanshire district second preliminary round replay
Date	Home team	Score	Away team	Venue
	Vale of Leven	w/o (Note: Denny scratched and Vale of Leven advanced to the third preliminary round.)	Denny	

=== Forfarshire and Perthshire district ===
Forfarshire and Perthshire district second preliminary round results
Date	Home team	Score	Away team	Venue
23 September 1893	Strathmore	4–2	Dundee (Note: Dundee were also scheduled to play St Mirren in Division One on 23 September. As a result, they played their first team in the league match and sent a reserve team to face Strathmore.)	Carolina Port, Dundee
23 September 1893	Dunblane	4–2	Fair City Athletic	Duckburn Park, Dunblane
23 September 1893	Montrose	1–3	Dundee Harp	Links Park, Montrose
23 September 1893	Johnstone Wanderers	9–1	Our Boys	Cartland Bank, Johnstone
	Arbroath	w/o (Note: Dundee Our Boys amalgamated with Dundee East End to form Dundee but were erroneously included in the draw and received a bye to the second preliminary round. Arbroath received a walkover and advanced to the third preliminary round.)	Dundee Our Boys	

=== Argyll district ===
Argyll district second preliminary round results
Date	Home team	Score	Away team	Venue
23 September 1893	Dunach	1–3	Inveraray	Mossfield Park, Oban

=== Aberdeenshire district ===
Orion received a bye to the third preliminary round.

Aberdeenshire district second preliminary round results
Date	Home team	Score	Away team	Venue
23 September 1893	Victoria United	8–0	Aberdeen	Recreation Grounds, Aberdeen

=== Northern Counties district ===
Northern Counties district second preliminary round results
Date	Home team	Score	Away team	Venue
23 September 1893	Inverness Thistle	4–3	Clachnacuddin	Kingsmills Park, Inverness

=== Southern Counties district ===
St Cuthbert Wanderers received a bye to the third preliminary round.

Southern Counties district second preliminary round results
Date	Home team	Score	Away team	Venue
23 September 1893	5th Kirkcudbright RV	5–0	Annan	Palmerston Park, Dumfries
23 September 1893	Queen of the South Wanderers	15–1	Moffat	Recreation Grounds, Dumfries

== Third preliminary round ==
=== Glasgow, Lanarkshire, Renfrewshire, Ayrshire and Argyll district ===
Queen of the South Wanderers received a bye to the fourth preliminary round.

Glasgow, Lanarkshire, Renfrewshire, Ayrshire and Argyll district third preliminary round results
Date	Home team	Score	Away team	Venue
14 October 1893	Albion Rovers	7–0	Neilston	Meadow Park, Coatbridge
14 October 1893	Galston	2–2	Cambuslang	Portland Park, Galston
14 October 1893	Cronberry Eglinton	1–3 (abandoned) (Note: Abandoned due to darkness after 86 minutes. The tie was ordered to be replayed.)	Battlefield	Derrens Holm, Cronberry
14 October 1893	Cowlairs	3–3	Black Watch	Gourlay Park, Glasgow
14 October 1893	Hurlford	3–0	Johnstone	Station Park, Hurlford
14 October 1893	Lanemark	4–2	Saltcoats Victoria	Connel Park, New Cumnock
14 October 1893	Cartvale	1–3	Airdrieonians	Cartsbridge Park, Busby
14 October 1893	Kilmarnock	3–3	Motherwell	Rugby Park, Kilmarnock
14 October 1893	St Cuthbert Wanderers	2–2	5th Kirkcudbright RV	St Mary's Park, Kirkcudbright
	Inveraray	w/o (Note: Inveraray scratched and Port Glasgow Athletic advanced to the fourth preliminary round.)	Port Glasgow Athletic	

Glasgow, Lanarkshire, Renfrewshire, Ayrshire and Argyll district third preliminary round replays
Date	Home team	Score	Away team	Venue
21 October 1893	Cambuslang	2–2 (Note: The four teams involved in drawn replays advanced to the fourth preliminary round.)	Galston	Whitefield Park, Cambuslang
21 October 1893	Cowlairs	1–1	Black Watch	Gourlay Park, Glasgow
21 October 1893	Motherwell	1–3	Kilmarnock	Dalziel Park, Motherwell
21 October 1893	5th Kirkcudbright RV	9–0	St Cuthbert Wanderers	Palmerston Park, Dumfries
28 October 1893	Cronberry Eglinton	1–5	Battlefield	Derrens Holm, Cronberry

=== East of Scotland, Fife, Dunbartonshire, Stirlingshire and Clackmannanshire district ===
East Stirlingshire and Edinburgh University received a bye to the fourth preliminary round.

East of Scotland, Fife, Dunbartonshire, Stirlingshire and Clackmannanshire district third preliminary round results
Date	Home team	Score	Away team	Venue
14 October 1893	Alloa Athletic	4–5	Falkirk	Bellvue Park, Alloa
14 October 1893	Gairdoch	3–1	Polton Vale	Main Street, Carronshore
14 October 1893	Lochgelly United	1–4	Kilsyth Wanderers	School's Park, Lochgelly
14 October 1893	Kirkcaldy	Not played (Note: Kirkcaldy claimed the tie after Mossend Swifts telegrammed to inform them that they had missed their train connection in Edinburgh. The tie was ordered to be replayed after a letter from the stationmaster at West Calder was presented to the SFA confirming that Mossend Swifts could not have made it to Kirkcaldy.)	Mossend Swifts	Newtown Park, Kirkcaldy
14 October 1893	Vale of Leven	1–0	Hibernian	Millburn Park, Alexandria
14 October 1893	Grangemouth	3–0	Slamannan Rovers	Caledonian Park, Grangemouth

East of Scotland, Fife, Dunbartonshire, Stirlingshire and Clackmannanshire district third preliminary round replay
Date	Home team	Score	Away team	Venue
28 October 1893	Kirkcaldy	3–3	Mossend Swifts	Newtown Park, Kirkcaldy

East of Scotland, Fife, Dunbartonshire, Stirlingshire and Clackmannanshire district third preliminary round second replay
Date	Home team	Score	Away team	Venue
	Mossend Swifts	w/o (Note: Kirkcaldy scratched and Mossend Swifts advanced to the fourth preliminary round.)	Kirkcaldy	

=== Aberdeenshire and Northern Counties ===
Inverness Thistle received a bye to the fourth preliminary round.

Aberdeenshire and Northern Counties third preliminary round results
Date	Home team	Score	Away team	Venue
14 October 1893	Victoria United	1–6	Orion	Recreation Grounds, Aberdeen

=== Forfarshire and Perthshire district ===
Dundee Harp received a bye to the fourth preliminary round.

Forfarshire and Perthshire district third preliminary round results
Date	Home team	Score	Away team	Venue
14 October 1893	Strathmore	3–2 (protested) (Note: A protest from Arbroath was upheld and a replay was ordered.)	Arbroath	Carolina Port, Dundee
	Dunblane	w/o (Note: Johnstone Wanderers scratched and Dunblane advanced to the fourth preliminary round.)	Johnstone Wanderers	

Forfarshire and Perthshire district third preliminary round replay
Date	Home team	Score	Away team	Venue
28 October 1893	Strathmore	3–3	Arbroath	Carolina Port, Dundee

Forfarshire and Perthshire district third preliminary round second replay
Date	Home team	Score	Away team	Venue
4 November 1893	Arbroath	3–1	Strathmore	Gayfield Park, Arbroath

== Fourth preliminary round ==
Airdrieonians, Arbroath, Black Watch, Cowlairs, Kilmarnock and Vale of Leven received a bye to the first round.

Fourth preliminary round results
Date	Home team	Score	Away team	Venue
4 November 1893	Dundee Harp	1–3	East Stirlingshire	East Dock Street, Dundee
4 November 1893	Inverness Thistle	4–3	Queen of the South Wanderers	Kingsmills Park, Inverness
4 November 1893	5th Kirkcudbright RV	4–2	Dunblane	Palmerston Park, Dumfries
4 November 1893	Edinburgh University	3–3	Hurlford	Craiglockart, Edinburgh
4 November 1893	Orion	4–2	Kilsyth Wanderers	Cattofield, Aberdeen
4 November 1893	Cambuslang	7–0	Gairdoch	Whitefield Park, Cambuslang
4 November 1893	Battlefield	8–1	Lanemark	Mossfield Park, Glasgow
4 November 1893	Falkirk	3–3	Albion Rovers	Brockville Park, Falkirk
4 November 1893	Mossend Swifts	2–2	Port Glasgow Athletic	Mossend Park, West Calder
4 November 1893	Grangemouth	3–1	Galston	Caledonian Park, Grangemouth

Fourth preliminary round replays
Date	Home team	Score	Away team	Venue
11 November 1893	Hurlford	8–1	Edinburgh University	Station Park, Hurlford
11 November 1893	Albion Rovers	5–2	Falkirk	Meadow Park, Coatbridge
11 November 1893	Port Glasgow Athletic	9–3	Mossend Swifts	Clune Park, Port Glasgow
