= 1889–90 Scottish Cup =

Scottish Cup
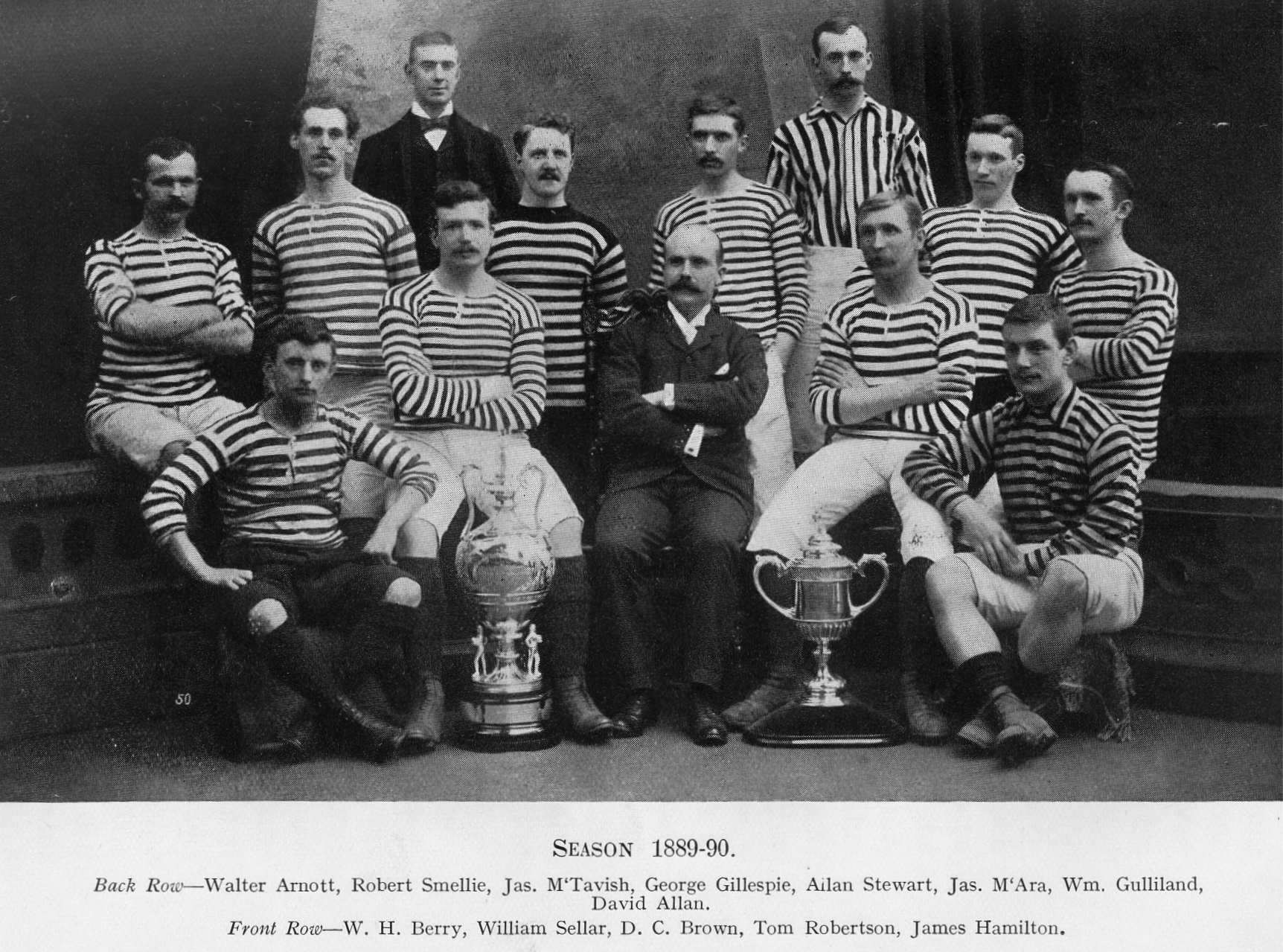
- Queen's Park's winning team with the trophy

Tournament details
- Country: Scotland
- Teams: 158

Final positions
- Champions: Queen's Park (ninth title)
- Runners-up: Vale of Leven

The 1889–90 Scottish Cup was the 17th season of Scotland's most prestigious football knockout competition. Queen's Park defeated rivals Vale of Leven 2–1 in a replayed final.

== Calendar ==
Round	First match date	Fixtures			Clubs
Round	First match date	Original	Byes	Replays	Clubs
First Round	31 August 1889				→
Second Round	28 September 1889				→
Third Round	19 October 1889				→
Fourth Round	9 November 1889				→
Fifth Round	30 November 1889				→
Quarter-finals	21 December 1889				→
Semi-finals	18 January 1890				→ 2
Final	22 February 1890	1	0	1	2 → 1

== Teams ==
All 158 teams entered the competition in the first round.

Ayrshire	East of Scotland	Glasgow and District		Lanarkshire	Renfrewshire	Stirlingshire
Annbank; Ayr; Ayr Athletic; Beith; Dalry; Hurlford; Irvine; Kilbirnie; Kilmarnock; Kilmarnock Athletic; Lanemark; Lugar Boswell; Maybole; Mauchline; Newmilns; Stevenston Thistle; Stewarton Cunninghame	Adventurers; Armadale; Bathgate Rovers; Bellstane Birds; Bo'ness; Broxburn; Champfleurie; Edinburgh University; Heart of Midlothian; Hibernian; Leith Athletic; Mossend Swifts; Norton Park; St Bernard's; West Calder	Battlefield; Carrington; Celtic; Clyde; Cowlairs; Fairfield; Glasgow Hibernian; Kelvinside Athletic; Linthouse; Maryhill; Northern; Partick Thistle	Queen's Park; Rangers; Shettleston; Southern Athletic; Summerton Athletic; Temperance Athletic; Thistle; United Abstainers; Victoria; Whitefield; 3rd Lanark RV	Airdriehill; Airdrieonians; Albion Rovers; Cambuslang; Cambuslang St Bride's; Clydesdale; Carfin Shamrock; Hamilton Academical; Motherwell; Royal Albert; Rutherglen; Uddingston; Whifflet Shamrock; Wishaw Thistle	Abercorn; Arthurlie; Bute Rangers; Carlton; Dykebar; Greenock Abstainers; Johnstone Harp; Kilbarchan; Lochwinnoch; Morton; Neilston; Pollokshaws; Pollokshaws Harp; Port Glasgow Athletic; Renfrew; St Mirren; Thornliebank; 1st Renfrew RV	Alloa Athletic; Alva; Camelon; Campsie; Denny; Dunipace; East Stirlingshire; Falkirk; Gairdoch; Grangemouth; Kilsyth Wanderers; King's Park; Laurieston; Stenhousemuir; Slamannan; Tillicoultry; Vale of Bannock
Argyll	Dunbartonshire	Fife	Forfarshire	Northern Counties	Perthshire	Southern Counties
Lochgilphead; Oban; Oban Rangers	Bowling; Clydebank; Dumbarton; Dumbarton Union; Duntocher Harp; Jamestown; Kirkintilloch Athletic; Methlan Park; Old Kilpatrick; Renton; Smithstone Hibs; Vale of Leven; Vale of Leven Wanderers	Burntisland Thistle; Cowdenbeath; Dunfermline; Dunfermline Athletic; Kirkcaldy Wanderers; Lassodie; Raith Rovers	Arbroath; Brechin; Broughty; Dundee East End; Dundee Our Boys; Dundee Harp; Forfar Athletic; Lindertis; Lochee; Montrose; Strathmore; Wanderers	Aberdeen; Orion; Portland Lybster; Victoria United	Caledonian Rangers; Coupar Angus; Crieff; Dunblane; Fair City Athletic; Our Boys (Blairgowrie); St Johnstone; Vale of Atholl	Dumfries; Dumfries Harp; Mid-Annandale; Moffat; Newton Stewart Athletic; Queen of the South Wanderers; 5th Kircudbrightshire RV

== First round ==
=== Matches ===
==== Ayrshire district ====
Lanemark received a bye to the second round.

7 September 1889	Dalry	3–3	Kilbirnie	Dalry
				Stadium: Blairland Park

7 September 1889	Maybole	6–6	Ayr Athletic	Maybole
				Stadium: Gardenrose Farm

7 September 1889	Mauchline	1–4	Newmilns	Mauchline
				Stadium: Connel Park

7 September 1889	Stevenston Thistle	4–1	Kilmarnock Athletic	Stevenston
				Stadium: Warner Park

7 September 1889	Ayr	16–0	Beith	Ayr
				Stadium: Somerset Park

7 September 1889	Stewarton Cunninghame	0–5	Hurlford	Stewarton
				Stadium: Standalone Park

7 September 1889	Irvine	2–2	Lugar Boswell	Irvine
				Stadium: Cochrane Park

7 September 1889	Kilmarnock	2–3	Annbank	Kilmarnock
	Campbell			Stadium: Rugby Park; Attendance: 4,000

==== Dunbartonshire district ====
Kirkintilloch Athletic received a bye to the second round.

7 September 1889	Bowling	1–8	Renton	Bowling
				Stadium: Dunglass Park

7 September 1889	Vale of Leven	0–0	Dumbarton	Alexandria
				Stadium: Millburn Park; Attendance: 4,000

7 September 1889	Jamestown	2–4	Methlan Park	Jamestown
				Stadium: Balloch Road

7 September 1889	Duntocher Harp	5–0	Smithstone Hibs	Duntocher
				Stadium: St Helena Park

7 September 1889	Old Kilpatrick	1–7	Dumbarton Union	Old Kilpatrick
				Stadium: High Lusset Park

Clydebank	w/o	Vale of Leven Wanderers

==== East of Scotland ====
Edinburgh University received a bye to the second round.

31 August 1889	West Calder	2–9	Broxburn	West Calder
				Stadium: Burngrange Park

7 September 1889	Bathgate Rovers	3–3	Champfleurie	Bathgate
				Stadium: Boghead Park

7 September 1889	Mossend Swifts	6–0	Bo'ness	West Calder
				Stadium: Mossend Park

7 September 1889	Bellstane Birds	6–3	Norton Park	Queensferry
				Stadium: Bird's Park

7 September 1889	St Bernard's	0–3	Heart of Midlothian	Edinburgh
			Scott; McIntosh (o.g.); Baird	Stadium: New Logie Green; Attendance: 5,000

7 September 1889	Leith Athletic	6–2	Adventurers	Edinburgh
				Stadium: Hawkhill

7 September 1889	Armadale	2–3	Hibernian	Armadale
			McGhee (x2); Dukes	Stadium: Volunteer Park

==== Fife district ====
Dunfermline received a bye to the second round.

7 September 1889	Lassodie	3–2	Burntisland Thistle	Lassodie
				Stadium: Green Bank Park

7 September 1889	Raith Rovers	1–2	Dunfermline Athletic	Kirkcaldy
				Stadium: Robbies Park

7 September 1889	Cowdenbeath	8–0	Kirkcaldy Wanderers	Cowdenbeath
				Stadium: North End Park

==== Renfrewshire district ====
31 August 1889	Abercorn	10–1	Lochwinnoch	Paisley
				Stadium: Underwood Park

7 September 1889	Arthurlie	2–4	St Mirren	Barrhead
				Stadium: Dunterlie Park; Attendance: 3,000

7 September 1889	1st Renfrew RV	7–1	Pollokshaws Harp	Greenock
				Stadium: Volunteer Park

7 September 1889	Bute Rangers	1–2	Kilbarchan	Rothesay
				Stadium: High Street

7 September 1889	Pollokshaws	3–1	Dykebar	Pollokshaws
				Stadium: Maxwell Park

7 September 1889	Morton	8–0	Carlton	Greenock
				Stadium: Cappielow

7 September 1889	Port Glasgow Athletic	2–1	Neilston	Port Glasgow
	McMillan; Brandon			Stadium: Clune Park

Renfrew	w/o	Greenock Abstainers

Thornliebank	w/o	Johnstone Harp

==== Glasgow and District ====
Clyde received a bye to the second round.

7 September 1889	Rangers	6–2	United Abstainers	Govan
				Stadium: Ibrox Park

7 September 1889	3rd Lanark RV	3–2	Partick Thistle	Crosshill
				Stadium: Cathkin Park

7 September 1889	Shettleston	1–7	Battlefield	Glasgow
				Stadium: Carntyne Park

7 September 1889	Whitefield	0–5	Northern	Govan
				Stadium: Whitefield Park

7 September 1889	Linthouse	7–2	Fairfield	Linthouse
				Stadium: Langlands Park

7 September 1889	Glasgow Hibernian	1–3	Thistle	Glasgow
				Stadium: Hibernian Park

7 September 1889	Celtic	0–0	Queen's Park	Glasgow
				Stadium: Celtic Park; Attendance: 26,000

7 September 1889	Carrington	0–3	Maryhill	Glasgow
				Stadium: Hanover Park

7 September 1889	Cowlairs	21–1	Victoria	Glasgow
				Stadium: Gourlay Park

Kelvinside Athletic	w/o	Southern Athletic

Temperance Athletic	w/o	Summerton Athletic

==== Lanarkshire district ====
7 September 1889	Hamilton Academical	0–5	Wishaw Thistle	Hamilton
				Stadium: Douglas Park

7 September 1889	Rutherglen	2–8	Uddingston	Rutherglen
				Stadium: Lochgair

7 September 1889	Carfin Shamrock	4–0	Albion Rovers	Carfin
				Stadium: Byreknowes Park

7 September 1889	Royal Albert	12–0	Whifflet Shamrock	Larkhall
				Stadium: Raploch Park

7 September 1889	Airdriehill	5–6	Motherwell	Airdrie
				Stadium: Airdriehill Park

7 September 1889	Clydesdale	1–6	Cambuslang	Rutherglen
				Stadium: South Croft

Cambuslang St Bride's	w/o	Airdrieonians

==== Forfarshire district ====
7 September 1889	Montrose	2–4	Forfar Athletic	Montrose
				Stadium: Links Park

7 September 1889	Dundee Our Boys	6–3	Strathmore	Dundee
				Stadium: West Craigie Park

7 September 1889	Lindertis	0–5	Wanderers	Kirriemuir
				Stadium: The Hill

7 September 1889	Arbroath	3–5	Dundee Harp	Arbroath
				Stadium: Gayfield Park

7 September 1889	Lochee	4–1	Brechin	Dundee
				Stadium: South Park Road

7 September 1889	Broughty	1–6	Dundee East End	Broughty Ferry
				Stadium: Forthill Park

==== Northern Counties ====
7 September 1889	Orion	3–1	Victoria United	Aberdeen
				Stadium: Central Park

Portland Lybster	w/o	Aberdeen

==== Stirlingshire district ====
Camelon received a bye to the second round.

7 September 1889	Kilsyth Wanderers	5–1	Stenhousemuir	Kilsyth
				Stadium: Garrel Gardens Park

7 September 1889	Gairdoch	0–7	East Stirlingshire	Carronshore
				Stadium: Grahamstown Park

7 September 1889	Vale of Bannock	3–6	Campsie	Bannockburn
				Stadium: Viewvale

7 September 1889	Falkirk	11–1	Tillicoultry	Falkirk
				Stadium: Brockville Park

7 September 1889	Slamannan	0–8	Grangemouth	Slamannan
				Stadium: Castleburn Park

7 September 1889	Alva	3–6	King's Park	Alva
				Stadium: Craigleith Park

7 September 1889	Alloa Athletic	5–1	Denny	Alloa
				Stadium: Gaberston Park

7 September 1889	Dunipace	2–3	Laurieston	Denny
				Stadium: Bankend

==== Perthshire district ====
7 September 1889	Fair City Athletic	8–0	Coupar Angus	Perth
				Stadium: Balhousie Park

7 September 1889	Blairgowrie Our Boys	3–5	St Johnstone	Blairgowrie and Rattray
				Stadium: Lower Haugh Park

7 September 1889	Dunblane	4–1	Caledonian Rangers	Dunblane
				Stadium: Duckburn Park

Vale of Atholl	w/o	Crieff

==== Argyll district ====
Lochgilphead received a bye to the second round.

7 September 1889	Oban	5–2	Oban Rangers	Oban
				Stadium: Dalintart Park

==== Southern Counties ====
Lochgilphead received a bye to the second round.

7 September 1889	Newton Stewart Athletic	3–4	Queen of the South Wanderers	Newton Stewart
				Stadium: Holm Park

7 September 1889	Moffat	8–0	Dumfries	Moffat
				Stadium: Ballplay Road

7 September 1889	Mid-Annandale	3–11	5th Kirkcudbrightshire	Lockerbie
				Stadium: Livingstone Place Park

=== Replays ===
==== Ayrshire district ====
14 September 1889	Kilbirnie	5–2	Dalry	Kilbirnie
				Stadium: Milton Park

14 September 1889	Ayr Athletic	3–1	Maybole	Ayr

14 September 1889	Lugar Boswell	8–0	Irvine	Lugar
				Stadium: Rosebank Park

==== Dunbartonshire district ====
14 September 1889	Dumbarton	1–1	Vale of Leven	Dumbarton
	Mair		Walker	Stadium: Boghead Park; Attendance: 4,000; Referee: Cameron

==== East of Scotland ====
Champfleurie	w/o	Bathgate Rovers

==== Glasgow and District ====
14 September 1889	Queen's Park	2–1	Celtic	Glasgow
			Groves	Stadium: Hampden Park; Attendance: 11,000

Notes

1. A-Clydebank forfeited the tie on the basis that it was four players short, but won a resulting friendly 3–1.
2. B-Match abandoned after 75 minutes. The result was allowed to stand.
3. C-Both teams advanced to the second round.

== Second round ==
Ayr Athletic, Champfleurie, Edinburgh University, Kilsyth Wanderers, Pollokshaws and Wishaw Thistle received a bye to the third round.

=== Matches ===
28 September 1889	Abercorn	10–1	Thornliebank	Paisley

28 September 1889	Aberdeen	2–1	Orion	Aberdeen
				Stadium: Central Park

28 September 1889	Airdrieonians	5–2	Uddingston	Airdrie
				Stadium: Mavisbank Park

28 September 1889	Battlefield	0–2	Thistle	Glasgow

28 September 1889	Bellstane Birds	1–4	Heart of Midlothian	South Queensferry
	Duffy		Scott; Baird (x2); Taylor	Stadium: Bird's Park; Attendance: 2,000

28 September 1889	Broxburn	2–2	Leith Athletic	Broxburn
				Stadium: Albyn Park

28 September 1889	Camelon	4–4	Grangemouth	Camelon

28 September 1889	Campsie	3–7	Alloa Athletic	Milton of Campsie
				Stadium: Lennox Park

28 September 1889	Carfin Shamrock	6–2	Motherwell	Carfin
				Stadium: Byreknowes Park

28 September 1889	Clyde	1–2	Northern	Glasgow
				Stadium: Barrowfield Park

28 September 1889	Cowlairs	1–1	Linthouse	Glasgow

28 September 1889	Dumbarton Union	5–2	Kirkintilloch Athletic	Dumbarton

28 September 1889	Dumfries Harp	1–5	Queen of the South Wanderers	Dumfries

28 September 1889	Dundee Harp	5–6	Dundee Our Boys	Dundee

28 September 1889	Duntocher Harp	3–4	Vale of Leven Wanderers	Duntocher

28 September 1889	Falkirk	5–2	King's Park	Falkirk
				Stadium: Brockville Park

28 September 1889	Hibernian	4–3	Mossend Swifts	Edinburgh
	McMahon (x2)			Stadium: Hibernian Park; Attendance: 2,500

28 September 1889	Kelvinside Athletic	0–13	Rangers	Glasgow
			McIntyre; Mitchell; Wyllie (x2); Robin; Allan (x2); Henderson (x2)	Stadium: Kelburne Park; Attendance: 2,000

28 September 1889	Kilbirnie	5–0	Newmilns	Kilbirnie

28 September 1889	Lanemark	2–1	Hurlford	New Cumnock

28 September 1889	Lassodie	3–3	Cowdenbeath	Lassodie
				Stadium: Greenbank Park

28 September 1889	Laurieston	1–4	East Stirlingshire	Laurieston
				Stadium: Zetland Park

28 September 1889	Lochee	1–7	Forfar Athletic	Dundee

28 September 1889	Lugar Boswell	0–2	Ayr	Lugar

28 September 1889	Moffat	4–1	5th Kirkcudbrightshire RV	Moffat

28 September 1889	Port Glasgow Athletic	8–0	Greenock Abstainers	Port Glasgow
				Stadium: Clune Park

28 September 1889	Queen's Park	11–0	Summerton Athletic	Glasgow
				Stadium: Hampden Park

28 September 1889	Renton	1–2	Dumbarton	Renton
			Fraser; Lindsay	Stadium: Tontine Park; Attendance: 4,000

28 September 1889	Royal Albert	1–1	Cambuslang	Larkhall

28 September 1889	St Johnstone	2–2	Fair City Athletic	Perth
				Stadium: Recreation Grounds

28 September 1889	St Mirren	6–0	Kilbarchan	Paisley
	Dunlop; Hill (x2); Brown; Johnston; McBain			Stadium: Westmarch

28 September 1889	Stevenston Thistle	3–2	Annbank	Stevenston

28 September 1889	Vale of Atholl	4–9	Dunblane	Pitlochry

28 September 1889	Vale of Leven	4–1	Methlan Park	Alexandria
				Stadium: Millburn Park

28 September 1889	Wanderers	0–2	Dundee East End	Dundee

28 September 1889	1st Renfrew RV	2–10	Morton	Greenock
				Stadium: Volunteer Park

28 September 1889	3rd Lanark RV	9–3	Maryhill	Glasgow
				Stadium: Cathkin Park

Dunfermline Athletic	w/o	Dunfermline

Oban	w/o	Lochgilphead

=== Replays ===
5 October 1889	Cambuslang	4–1	Royal Albert	Cambuslang

5 October 1889	Fair City Athletic	3–2	St Johnstone	Perth
				Stadium: Balhousie Park

5 October 1889	Grangemouth	7–2	Camelon	Grangemouth

5 October 1889	Leith Athletic	2–1	Broxburn	Edinburgh

5 October 1889	Linthouse	3–2	Cowlairs	Glasgow

Cowdenbeath	w/o	Lassodie

== Third round ==
Cowdenbeath received a bye to the fourth round.

=== Matches ===
19 October 1889	Abercorn	5–2	Stevenston Thistle	Paisley

19 October 1889	Aberdeen	5–3	Forfar Athletic	Aberdeen
				Stadium: Central Park

19 October 1889	Alloa Athletic	3–0	Oban	Alloa
				Stadium: Gaberston Park

19 October 1889	Champfluerie	0–5	Heart of Midlothian	Kingscavil
				Stadium: Champfluerie Park

19 October 1889	Dumbarton	1–1	3rd Lanark RV	Dumbarton
				Stadium: Boghead Park; Attendance: 4,000

19 October 1889	Dumbarton Union	1–3 (Void)	Cambuslang	Dumbarton

19 October 1889	Dunblane	3–0	Fair City Athletic	Dunblane

19 October 1889	Dundee Our Boys	2–3	Dundee East End	Dundee

19 October 1889	Dunfermline Athletic	4–4	Hibernian	Dunfermline
			Flannigan; McMahon; C. McGhee; Smith	Stadium: East End Park

19 October 1889	Edinburgh University	0–9	Leith Athletic	Edinburgh
				Stadium: Craiglockart

19 October 1889	Falkirk	1–6	East Stirlingshire	Falkirk
				Stadium: Brockville Park

19 October 1889	Grangemouth	2–2	Kilsyth Wanderers	Grangemouth

19 October 1889	Lanemark	4–3	Ayr Athletic	New Cumnock

19 October 1889	Moffat	0–0	Queen of the South Wanderers	Moffat

19 October 1889	Morton	1–4	Ayr	Greenock
				Stadium: Cappielow

19 October 1889	Northern	2–1 (Void)	Carfin Shamrock	Glasgow

19 October 1889	Port Glasgow Athletic	3–4	Kilbirnie	Port Glasgow
	McMillan			Stadium: Clune Park

19 October 1889	Queen's Park	8–0	Vale of Leven Wanderers	Glasgow
				Stadium: Hampden Park

19 October 1889	Rangers	0–0	Vale of Leven	Govan
				Stadium: Ibrox Park; Attendance: 8,500

19 October 1889	St Mirren	5–1	Pollokshaws	Paisley
	Johnston (x2); Hill; Brown; Dunlop			Stadium: Westmarch

19 October 1889	Thistle	2–2	Airdrieonians	Glasgow
				Stadium: Beechwood Park

19 October 1889	Wishaw Thistle	5–8	Linthouse	Wishaw

=== Replays ===
26 October 1889	Airdrieonians	3–1	Thistle	Airdrie
				Stadium: Mavisbank Park

26 October 1889	Hibernian	11–1	Dunfermline Athletic	Edinburgh
	Coyle; Quigley; J. McGhee (x3); McMahon (x3); Smith (x3)			Stadium: Hibernian Park

26 October 1889	Kilsyth Wanderers	0–1	Grangemouth	Kilsyth

26 October 1889	Queen of the South Wanderers	5–5	Moffat	Dumfries

26 October 1889	Vale of Leven	3–2	Rangers	Alexandria
			Wyllie; Gow	Stadium: Millburn Park; Attendance: 4,500

26 October 1889	3rd Lanark RV	1–0	Dumbarton	Glasgow
				Stadium: Cathkin Park; Attendance: 8,000; Referee: Sneddon (Edinburgh)

2 November 1889	Cambuslang	6–0	Dumbarton Union	Cambuslang

2 November 1889	Northern	3–2	Carfin Shamrock	Glasgow

Notes

1. C-Both teams advanced to the fourth round.

== Fourth round ==
=== Matches ===
9 November 1889	Aberdeen	1–13	Queen's Park	Aberdeen
				Stadium: Central Park

9 November 1889	Airdrieonians	2–3	Abercorn	Airdrie
				Stadium: Mavisbank Park

9 November 1889	Ayr	2–2	Leith Athletic	Ayr
				Stadium: Somerset Park

9 November 1889	Dunblane	4–6	Cowdenbeath	Dunblane
				Stadium: Duckburn Park

9 November 1889	Dundee East End	3–2 (Void)	Cambuslang	Dundee

9 November 1889	Grangemouth	1–7	Vale of Leven	Grangemouth
				Stadium: Muirhead Park

9 November 1889	Heart of Midlothian	9–1	Alloa Athletic	Edinburgh
	Scott; Jenkinson (x3); Scrimmage; McPherson (x2)		Duff	Stadium: Tynecastle Park; Attendance: 3,000

9 November 1889	Kilbirnie	5–2	East Stirlingshire	Kilbirnie
				Stadium: Parkfoot

9 November 1889	Lanemark	2–8	St Mirren	New Cumnock
	Johnston; Bowie; W. McBain (x2); E. McBain; Dunlop (x3)			Stadium: Connell Park

9 November 1889	Moffat	4–2	Carfin Shamrock	Moffat

9 November 1889	Queen of the South Wanderers	3–7	Hibernian	Dumfries
				Stadium: Cresswell Park

9 November 1889	3rd Lanark	2–0	Linthouse	Glasgow
				Stadium: Cathkin Park

=== Replays ===
16 November 1889	Leith Athletic	4–1	Ayr	Edinburgh

23 November 1889	Dundee East End	3–2	Cambuslang	Dundee

== Fifth round ==
Hibernian, Kilbirnie, Leith Athletic and 3rd Lanark RV received a bye to the quarter-finals.

=== Matches ===
30 November 1889	Cowdenbeath	2–8	Abercorn	Cowdenbeath
				Stadium: North End Park

30 November 1889	Moffat	2–2	Dundee East End	Moffat

30 November 1889	Queen's Park	1–0	St Mirren	Glasgow
				Stadium: Hampden Park; Attendance: 10,000

30 November 1889	Vale of Leven	3–1	Heart of Midlothian	Alexandria
	Scrimmage 1'; Paton 70', 87'		Grierson 80'	Stadium: Millburn Park; Attendance: 3,000

=== Replay ===
7 December 1889	Dundee East End	5–1	Moffat	Dundee

== Quarter-finals ==
Team One	Team Two	Score
Abercorn	Hibernian	6–2
Queen's Park	Leith Athletic	1–0
Kilbirnie	Third Lanark	1–4
Vale of Leven	East End	4–0

== Semi-finals ==
Team One	Team Two	Score
Vale of Leven	Third Lanark	3–0
Queen's Park	Abercorn	2–0

== Final ==
=== Original ===
15 February 1890
15:00

Queen's Park	1–1	Vale of Leven
Hamilton 89'		McLachlan 30'

Ibrox Park, Govan
Attendance: 11,000

=== Replay ===
22 February 1890
15:00

Queen's Park	2–1	Vale of Leven
Hamilton 80'; Stewart 82'		Bruce 18'

Ibrox Park, Govan
Attendance: 13,000

=== Teams ===
Queen's Park:
GK	George Gillespie
RB	Walter Arnott
LB	Bob Smellie
RH	James McAra
CH	Allan Stewart
LH	Tom Robertson
OR	William Berry
IR	William Gulliland
CF	James Hamilton
IL	David Allan
OL	William Sellar

Vale of Leven:
GK	James Wilson
RB	Andrew Whitelaw
LB	John Murray
RH	Archie Osborne
CH	John McNicol
LH	James Sharp
OR	Jimmy McLachlan
IR	Gilbert Rankin
CF	Jim Paton
IL	Daniel Bruce
OL	James McMillan

- Teams were unchanged for the replay.
