= Pollokshaws Harp F.C. =

Association football club in Glasgow City, Scotland

Pollokshaws Harp
- Full name: Pollokshaws Harp Football Club
- Nickname: the Harp
- Founded: 1888
- Dissolved: 1891
- Ground: Norwood Park
- Match Secretary: John M'Ardle, John Mulholland
Home colours

Pollokshaws Harp Football Club was a Scottish football team, based in Pollokshaws, now part of Glasgow (at the time a separate burgh).

== History ==
The club was founded in 1888 and promptly joined the Scottish Football Association. Although drawn in the Renfrewshire section of the Scottish Cup, the club affiliated itself more with Glasgow, and entered the Glasgow Cup in 1888–89 rather than the Renfrewshire Cup. Its Glasgow Cup entry was a mixed blessing - the Harp beat the hapless Govan Athletic 8–2 in the first round, but lost 10–0 at Northern in the second. In November 1888 the club played a friendly against its town rival Pollokshaws and lost 8–0.

The club also entered the Scottish Cup in the same season, but lost 5–2 at home to Thornliebank in the second round, after walking over Greenock Northern in the first. The Harp also lost in the first round in the next two seasons. In the 1889–90 Scottish Cup, M'Donald gave the club the lead at the 1st Renfrewshire Rifle Volunteers, but the Volunteers scored seven goals without further reply. In the 1890–91 Scottish Cup, the Harp lost at Cathcart, by a score given as 5–1 or 5–3. It may not even have played at all in the Glasgow Cup; its one further entry in 1890–91 saw the club drawn to play Cambuslang, but there is no record of the match taking place; Cambuslang played Clyde on the day the tie was meant to have taken place, and the Harp seem to have ceded the tie.

The final match the club is known to have played was a 3–2 defeat at Clydesdale of Rutherglen, and in August 1891 the club was deleted from the roll for non-payment of subscriptions.

== Colours ==
The club originally wore white jerseys and dark blue knickers. In 1890 the club changed its shirts to green.

== Ground ==
The club played at Norwood Park, which had been used by other clubs in the area, most recently Shawlands and Granton.
