= John Rae (footballer, born 1862) =

Scottish footballer (1862–1917)

Personal information
- Full name: John Rae
- Date of birth: 27 December 1862
- Place of birth: Rutherglen, Scotland
- Date of death: 20 November 1917 (aged 54)
- Place of death: Hartwood, Scotland
- Position: Left back

Youth career
- Burnbank

Senior career*
Years	Team	Apps	(Gls)
–	Rutherglen		
1887–1890	Third Lanark		
1890–1892	Sunderland Albion		
1892	Thistle		
1893–1894	Third Lanark	11	(0)

International career
1889–1890	Scotland	2	(0)
1891	Football Alliance XI	1	(0)
- * Club domestic league appearances and goals

John Rae (1862 – 20 November 1917), sometimes misidentifed as James or Jim Rae, was a Scottish footballer who played as a left back for Rutherglen, Third Lanark (two spells, winning the Scottish Cup in 1889 in the first), Sunderland Albion and Scotland (gaining two caps between 1889 and 1890).
