= Cambuslang St Bride's F.C. =

Association football club in Scotland

Cambuslang St Bride's
- Full name: Cambuslang St Bride's Football Club
- Nickname: the Saints
- Founded: 1889
- Dissolved: 1893
- Ground: Westburn Park
- Hon. Secretary: R. Morgan
- Match Secretary: Hugh Gallacher
Home colours

Cambuslang St Bride's Football Club was an association football club from Cambuslang, Lanarkshire.

== History ==
The club was founded in 1889 by Glaswegian workers from Douglas, Lanarkshire, after predecessor Irish diaspora club Cambuslang Hibernian had been expelled from the Scottish Football Association for financial shenanigans. It played at the same Westburn Park ground as the Hibernians and took its name from the local Roman Catholic parish which had been founded in 1878.

The club was admitted to both the Scottish Football Association and the Glasgow Football Association in August 1889. The difficulties it had in the shadow of the much bigger Cambuslang F.C. were shown by the club losing its first match 8–1 at Whifflet Shamrock. Facing an inevitable defeat at home to Airdrieonians in the first round of the 1889–90 Scottish Cup, St Bride's "scratched on the field" and played a friendly instead, which the visitors won 7–1.

A week later the Saints scratched to Northern in the 1889–90 Glasgow Cup. It was the sole entry to the competition, as it left the Glasgow FA in August 1890. It kept its Scottish FA membership open to enter the 1890–91 Scottish Cup, and was drawn to play comparative minnows Rutherglen. However, again, St Bride's scratched, again played out a friendly, and again suffered a six-goal drubbing, this time 6–0.

The club had more success playing Junior ťsides, such as beating Millburn Athletic 5–0 but by November 1890 was struggling to form an XI, only seven players turning up for consecutive games against Glasgow East End (albeit with four replacements St Bride's still won 2–0) and against the Clyde F.C. reserve side.

The Saints somehow kept going to 1891–92, but scratched a third time in the Scottish Cup, this time to Carrington in the first qualifying round, After three successive withdrawals, the Scottish FA could not let the Saints remain as members, and the club does not seem to have played after a 2–1 win against the short-lived Linfield side of Anniesland in February 1892. Cambuslang Hibernian reformed as a Junior level club at around the same time.

== Colours ==
The club played in green.

== Ground ==
The club played at Westburn Park, also known as Roslea Park.
