= Shawlands F.C. =

Association football club in Glasgow City, Scotland

Shawlands
- Full name: Shawlands Football Club
- Founded: 1884
- Dissolved: 1886
- Ground: Norwood Park
- Hon. Secretary: Thos. A. Burton
Home colours

Shawlands Football Club was a Scottish football team, based in Pollokshaws, now part of Glasgow (at the time a separate burgh).

== History ==
The club was founded in 1884, with 53 members; it never grew above that figure, meaning the club was one of the smallest senior clubs in Glasgow.

Its record as a senior club was undistinguished. It took part in the Scottish Cup twice, in 1884–85 and 1885–86. In the former year, it was drawn to play Granton, an older but slightly bigger club which also played at Norwood Park. Granton scored the only goal of the game.

In its second entry, the club was drawn to visit 3rd Lanarkshire Rifle Volunteers, one of the leading clubs in the city, and was outclassed, the Volunteers winning 9–1; the Shawlands goal was a late consolation from a long shot.

The club played very few recorded games. It did not play in any of the regional cup competitions and the only "home and home" fixtures recorded for it were in 1884–85 against the obscure Helensburgh Athletic, resulting in a 3–3 draw and 5–1 defeat, and its only recorded win a 3–0 triumph over Pollokshaws in the same season. Together with Granton, it was struck from the Scottish FA roll in August 1886.

== Colours ==
The club played in white jerseys and navy knickers.

== Ground ==
The club shared Norwood Park with the Granton club. After the clubs' dissolution, the ground was taken over by Pollokshaws Harp.
