= Granton F.C. =

Association football club in Glasgow City, Scotland

Granton
- Full name: Granton Football Club
- Founded: 1879
- Dissolved: 1886
- Ground: Norwood Park
- Match Secretary: James Nicol
- Hon. Secretary: William Wilton
Home colours

Granton Football Club was a Scottish football team, based in Pollokshaws, now part of Glasgow (at the time a separate burgh).

== History ==
The club was founded in 1879, its earliest known match being a win over Kennington Reserves; it turned senior in 1882 by joining the Scottish Football Association, but with 23 members it was the smallest such club in Glasgow; indeed only Southfield of Slamannan was smaller. The move to senior football however attracted more members and by 1883 it was able to field three XIs, the third of which was captained by William Sellar.

Granton entered the Scottish Cup from 1882–83 to 1885–86, twice reaching the second round. In 1883–84 the club beat Glencairn 3–1 in the first round but lost 3–2 at Cowlairs in the second.

In the 1884–85 Scottish Cup, the club was drawn to play Shawlands, a new club which was also using Norwood Park as its home ground, and won 1–0; however Northern beat Granton 4–0 in the second round.

The rapid growth of the game, and the rise of professionalism, swiftly overtook Granton, and its last Cup tie was an 11–0 defeat at Partick Thistle, the club having sold home advantage. Together with Shawlands, it was struck from the Scottish FA roll in August 1886.

== Colours ==
The club played in 1" black and white hooped jerseys and blue knickers.

== Ground ==
The club played at Norwood Park. After the club's dissolution, the ground was taken over by Pollokshaws Harp.
