= Summerton Athletic F.C. =

Association football club in Glasgow City, Scotland

Summerton Athletic
- Full name: Summerton Athletic Football Club
- Nickname(s): the Athletic
- Founded: 1885
- Dissolved: 1892
- Ground: Victoria Park
- Hon. Secretary: William Hanna
Home colours

Summerton Athletic Football Club was a Scottish association football club based in Govan, now part of Glasgow.

== History ==
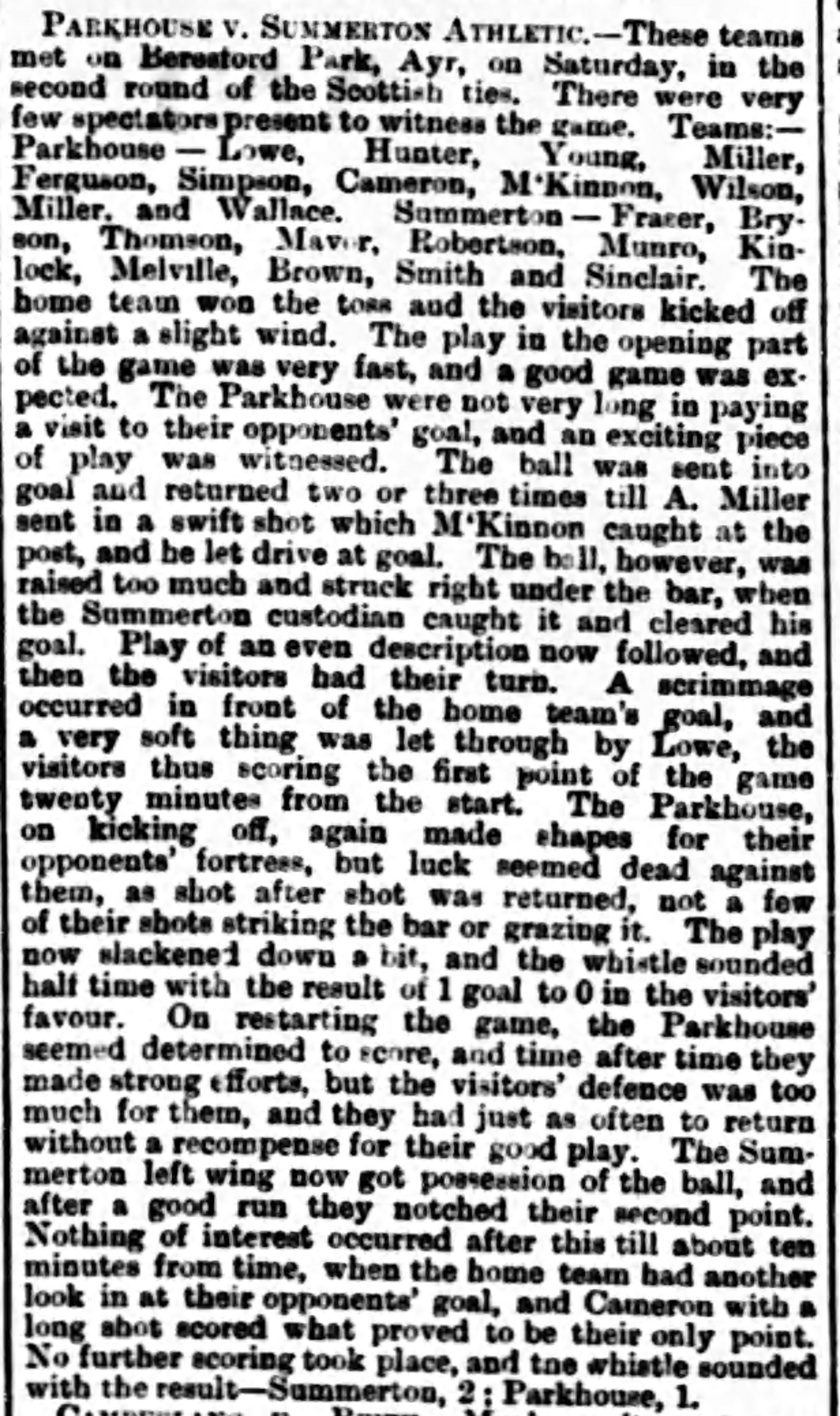
1890–91 Scottish Cup 2nd Round, Ayr Parkhouse 1–2 Summerton Athletic, Ayrshire Post, 3 October 1890

The club was founded in 1885 as a junior club; after success in local junior competitions, the club turned senior in 1889, by joining the Scottish Football Association, replacing the now-defunct Govan Athletic as members, the Govan secretary William Hanna (an Irish-born commercial clerk) taking over as secretary of Summerton.

Even a club as obscure as Summerton had suffered from the professionalism in the English game, losing John Smith and Robert Bryson to Elswick Rangers before the start of the 1889–90 season. The club at least started its senior career on a positive note, with an easy 5–1 win over Clydesdale, and it gained a walkover in the first round of the 1889–90 Scottish Cup, after Temperance Athletic scratched. Reality soon struck - in the first round of the Glasgow Cup, the club lost 4–1 at home to Partick Thistle, and in the second round of the national cup, the club was drawn away at Queen's Park. The home side scored 5 when playing against the wind and eased off when they had reached 11.

The club's consolation came in the Govan Jubilee Cup, which it won for the first time, beating Fairfield 1–0 in the final, at the first Ibrox Park, in front of 2,000 spectators. It was the prelude to the club's best season. In 1890–91, the club reached the third round of the Scottish Cup for the only time, albeit only winning one tie, 2–1 against Ayr Parkhouse in the second round, after Whifflet Shamrock withdrew before the first. in the third round, at 3rd L.R.V., Smith gave the club a surprise early lead, but the Volunteers came back to win 8–1.

Summerton also won a tie for the only time in the Glasgow Cup, beating Glasgow Hibernian in a first round replay. Second round conquerors Cowlairs were later suspended for professionalism, but the Athletic's application to be re-instated in Cowlairs' place was rejected. The Athletic closed the season by retaining the Govan Cup, beating Glasgow Wanderers 5–2 in the final. It even held the much bigger Linthouse to a "most sensational" 4–4 draw in the semi-final of the Govan & Ibrox Cup, although losing heavily in the replay.

However the Scottish League had also played its first season, and with Rangers in the League and Linthouse joining the Scottish Football Alliance, there was no realistic prospect of survival for other clubs in the Govan area. The Govan cup competitions fell into desuetude, and the club's last entry to the Glasgow Cup, in 1891–92, ended in the first round with a 5–1 defeat at home to the amateur Battlefield club. The club failed to appear for its first preliminary round tie in the 1891–92 Scottish Cup, and, although it entered the 1892–93 competition, it had dissolved before the first preliminary round ties took place. The name was continued by a separate junior side.

== Colours ==
The club's colours were black and white horizontal stripes with black knickers.

== Ground ==
The club played at Victoria Park, shared with United Abstainers Athletic.

== Notable players ==
- Jock Smith, who had an extensive career in the Football League

== Honours ==
- Govan Jubilee Cup:
  - Winner: 1889–90, 1890–91
- Govan & Ibrox Cup:
  - Runner-up: 1887–88
- Govan & Plantation Junior Cup:
  - Winner: 1885–86, 1886–87
- Govan Jubilee Junior Cup:
  - Winner: 1888–89
