= Govan Athletic F.C. =

Association football club in Glasgow City, Scotland

Govan Athletic
- Full name: Govan Athletic Football Club
- Nicknames: the Govanites, the Athletic
- Founded: 1885
- Dissolved: 1889
- Ground: Moore Park
- Secretary: W. Hanna
Home colours

Govan Athletic Football Club, often given in the form Govan Athletics, was a Scottish association football club based in Govan, now part of Glasgow.

== History ==
The club was founded in 1885, with its first recorded football matches coming from the 1885–86 season.

The Athletics entered the Scottish Cup for the first time in 1886–87. The club was drawn away to Rangers, and the notably young team was heavily defeated, 9–1, the only Govanite goal being scored just before half time - when already five goals down - by Barclay following a run down the wing.

The club was evidently ambitious; it had a reserve XI up and running from the 1886–87 season and even played a friendly against Glentoran in Belfast, the Govanites losing a four-goal lead to draw 5–5.

However the ambition soon ran dry. The second XI was struck from the Second Eleven Association roll after just one season for non-payment of subscriptions, and it suffered another heavy defeat in the first round of the 1887–88 Scottish Cup, this time 5–1 at Northern. The club also lost one of its players, David McGhee, a plumber from Burndyke Street, "playing a gentlemanly game", when he suffered a broken leg in a tackle against Vale of Bannock. The Vale held a benefit concert for McGhee, which raised £7 for him.

Before the start of the 1888–89 season, one of the best Athletic players, Archibald, was enticed away by Sunderland Albion. The Athletics nevertheless beat Union of Dumbarton 5–2 in its opening match of the season at Moore Park, but, one week later, the club was humiliated in the first round of the 1888–89 Scottish Cup when losing 16–0 at Kelvinside Athletic. The Govanites were 6–0 down at half-time, and after Stewart ran the length of the pitch from the start of the second half to make it seven, two of the Govan players walked off the pitch.

The club's failures on the national scale were mirrored in local competition. The only competitive match the club is ever know to have won was in the Govan Charity Cup in 1886–87, beating Blairvaddick 3–1 in the first round; it then lost 5–1 to Linthouse after protesting a 6–0 defeat in the original tie. The Athletic lost 11–0 at home to Renfrew in the 1887–88 Jubilee Cup, and scratched from the 1888–89 edition just before its first round match with Whitefield started, as the club had several players missing. The match was played as a friendly instead, which Whitefield won 13–0. The club did play one tie in the Glasgow Cup, in 1888–89, an 8–2 defeat at Pollokshaws Harp.

Govan did continue to the end of the season, but was struck from the membership rolls before the 1889–90 season. The final match known was a 4–1 defeat at Linthouse in the Govan & Ibrox Cup on 8 May 1889.

== Colours ==
The club's colours were black and white horizontal stripes with blue knickers.

== Ground ==
The club played at Moore Park, on Broomloan Road, which had previously been the ground of Govan F.C., which was dissolved in around 1881.
