= Carrington F.C. =

Association football club in Glasgow City, Scotland

Carrington
- Full name: Carrington Football Club
- Founded: 1883
- Dissolved: 1894
- Ground: Hanover Park
- Hon. Secretary: James Lennox, James M'Arthur
- Match Secretary: J. W. Maxwell Jr, Charles Stewart
Home colours

Carrington Football Club was a Scottish association football club based in Dennistoun, in Glasgow.

== History ==
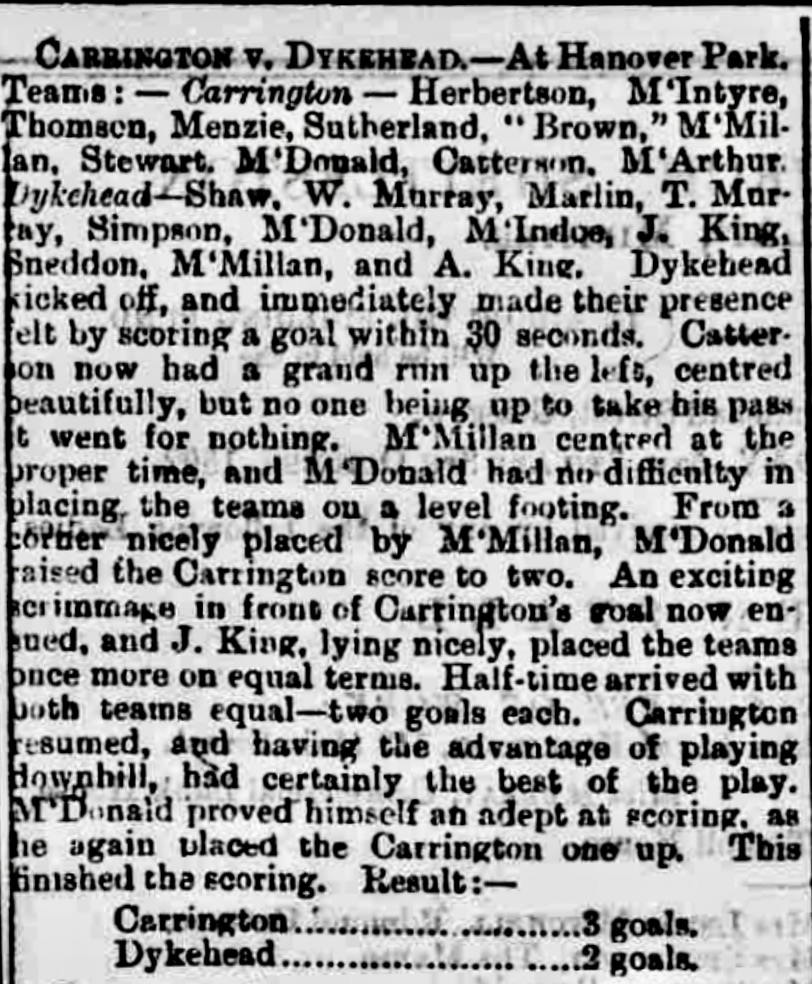
1892–93 Scottish Cup 1st Qualifying Round, Carrington 3–2 Dykehead, Rutherglen Reformer, 9 September 1892

A Carrington F.C., based at Wilton Park in east Glasgow, existed from 1874 to 1876, but this club was first noted in the 1883–84 season. By 1886 the club had become the leading Junior club in the east end, winning the North-Eastern Junior Cup from 1886–87 to 1888–89 consecutively, having been runner-up in 1884–85 and 1885–86. Even in 1887 the club had a decent following, 2,000 seeing the club's success in the final over Towerhill at Beechwood Park; earlier in that season's tournament, the club earned its biggest competitive win, 15–1 over Easthorn.

It took the step up to Scottish Football Association membership in August 1889. It entered four senior tournaments (the Scottish Cup, Glasgow Cup, North-Eastern Cup, and Graham Cup) in the 1889–90 season; the step-up to the senior level was by now so great that the club only won one tie in any of them, 2–0 against Clydesdale in the Graham Cup. It did originally beat Rutherglen in the North-Eastern but the match was re-played after a protest, to Carrington's detriment.

Its Scottish Cup bow was a 3–0 home defeat to Maryhill, and it also lost in the first round of the 1890–91 Scottish Cup, albeit only by 2–1 to the more experienced Albion Rovers; Carrington equalized when Stuart "banged through" a cross from M'Millan, but late on Bryson won the game for the Rovers. However, in the first round of the 1890–91 Glasgow Cup, Carrington lost 12–2 at Rangers; it was the club's biggest competitive defeat, the Carrington spirit shown by the team scoring its goals "at a time when some teams would not have had the heart to raise an aggressive rush", albeit allegedly when the Rangers goalkeeper "was seeking shelter in the pavilion".

From the 1891–1892 season, the Scottish FA introduced preliminary rounds to the national competition, but despite the bigger sides being exempted from qualifying, the club still lacked any success in the tournament. In 1891–92, the club at least got past the first round, after Cambuslang St Bride's scratched, but lost in the second 7–2 against Burnbank Swifts.

Carrington gained its one and only win in the competition in the first round in 1892–93, beating Dykehead 3–2 at home in the first preliminary; Dykehead protested that one of the corner flags was missing and that the pitch markings had been erased by heavy showers, but Carrington proved it had gone over the touchlines with lime and goal-lines with sawdust, and the referee gave evidence confirming the position, so the protest was dismissed. Carrington lost 10–3 at Annbank in the second, although it startled the home side with a goal inside two minutes, against the wind and the slope. Its last tie, in 1893–94, was a 6–1 defeat at Cambuslang, and in the wake of that defeat Carrington scratched to the 3rd Lanark in the Glasgow Cup.

With Celtic as one of the dominant powers in the Scottish game, plus neighbours Cowlairs, Northern, Clyde, and Thistle all being Scottish League members in period, there was no room for Carrington. It never won a tie in either the Glasgow or North-Eastern Cups, and in its last three entries in the latter competition, it was the only entrant which never made it to the Scottish League. Carrington never joined any of the alternative leagues, its application to join the Scottish Football Federation for the 1891–92 season not succeeding, and, with the few available friendlies too thin a gruel on which to subsist, the club gave up the ghost before the 1894–95 season.

== Colours ==
The club's earliest recorded colours are black and white striped jerseys. From 1889 the club wore dark blue jerseys, knickers, and hose.

== Ground ==
The club played at Hanover Park.
