= Uddingston F.C. (1887) =

Uddingston
- Full name: Uddingston Football Club
- Founded: 1886
- Dissolved: 1891
- Ground: Meadowbank
- Secretary: J. Wise Jr, A. N. C. Smith
Home colours

Uddingston Football Club was a 19th-century football club based in Uddingston, Lanarkshire, Scotland.

== History ==
The club was formed in August 1886, five years after the dissolution of the previous senior club in the town; one link with the previous club was Alex Inglis, who continued as a forward for the new club. Its earliest recorded match was at home to Hamilton Academical in April 1887, with George Somerville from Queen's Park guesting for the new side.

The club's first entry into the Scottish Cup in 1887–88 was not a success, with a 5–2 home defeat to Royal Albert.

However the 1888–89 season proved to be the club's most successful. In the 1888–89 Scottish Cup, the club reached the fourth round (final 22) for the only time, albeit thanks to some fortune, as the club received a bye in the first round, and a walkover from Glasgow University in the third; in between the club beat Rutherglen Clydesdale 5–1.

The run ended at home to Mossend Swifts (by which time Somerville had switched loyalties to Uddingston), but, in the Lanarkshire Cup, Uddingston reached the final for the only time. The club had recruited a new goalkeeper (M. Dolan from newly-defunct Drumpellier) and four other county representatives, and had only lost two matches all season; the Cup tie and a friendly with Carfin Shamrock just before Christmas 1888, which the club avenged by beating the Shamrock 3–2 away in the Lanarkshire Cup semi-final. In an earlier round the club had hammered Hamilton Academical 6–1 and the club had even managed a 2–2 draw at Rangers in a friendly.

The final (at Whifflet Shamrock's Meadow Park), against Royal Albert, was a 2–2 draw, Uddingston coming from two down with two goals from half-back Brown. The replay, at the same venue in front of 2,000 spectators, was spoilt by a heavy downpour which turned the pitch into a quagmire, and Uddingston, losing the toss, faced the worst of the conditions; despite this, Elliott gave the club the lead, but the Royalists equalized before half-time and won the game with 20 minutes to go. A protest against the state of the pitch was dismissed but the club had some consolation with a 4–3 friendly win over Hibernian.

There were already problems lurking for the side, however, as Lanarkshire was facing an influx of football agents seeking to recruit players for the professional game in England. The club remained locally strong in 1889–90 and 1890–91, reaching the semi-final of the Lanarkshire Cup in both years, and reached the third round of the Scottish Cup in the latter year, although the step up to face Queen's Park at Hampden Park was too far, and the club lost 6–0, five goals coming before half-time.

However, after showing such promise, the club's collapse was swift. It lost the use of its ground towards the end of the 1890–91 season, and, having been drawn at home in the Consolation Cup to Wishaw Thistle, had to cede home advantage; the club duly lost 6–3, having been 6–1 behind at half-time. The defeat is the club's last recorded match. It did enter the Scottish Cup for 1891–92, but scratched from the competition after being drawn against the low-key Kelvinside Athletic; the club did not live long enough to enter the county cup in the same season.

== Colours ==
The club played in white shirts and blue knickers, with a change shirt of black and white vertical stripes.

== Grounds ==
The club played at Meadowbank. The final game was a defeat by Battlefield in March 1891.
