= 21st Royal Scots Fusiliers F.C. =

Association football club in Glasgow City, Scotland

21st Royal Scots Fusiliers
- Full name: 21st Royal Scots Fusiliers F.C.
- Nickname(s): the Sodgers, the Red-coats
- Founded: 1873
- Dissolved: 1892
- Ground: Maryhill Barracks
- Secretary: D. M. Stuart
Home colours

The 21st Royal Scots Fusiliers F.C. was an association football club from Glasgow, which caused a surprise in the 1891–92 Scottish Cup qualifying round.

== History ==
The club was an army side, taken from the Royal Scots Fusiliers, and based at the Maryhill Barracks. The club retained the old name of the regiment during its existence as a senior club.

The earliest record for the club is a 4–0 defeat at Alexandra Athletic in December 1873. The club took on a more serious aspect when it joined the Scottish Football Association in August 1891 and entered the Scottish Cup, after the introduction of qualifying rounds.

The club started with a remarkable 4–2 win at Hamilton Academical, and held Ayr F.C. to a 3–3 draw away from home (having been 3–1 to the good at half-time, albeit with the best of the "boisterous" conditions). However many of the soldiers were redeployed in October 1891 to Fort George, and that seems to have had a deleterious effect on the club - it lost the replay to Ayr 2–1, and lost 3–0 in the Ayrshire Cup to Stevenston Thistle.

The last recorded game for the club was a 2–1 defeat to Saltcoats Victoria in November 1891 and the club did not renew its Scottish FA membership at the end of the season.

== Colours ==
The club's colours were dark blue and red.

== Ground ==
The club played at Kelburn Park, next to Maryhill Barracks.
