= Whifflet Shamrock F.C. =

Former association football club in Scotland

Whifflet Shamrock
- Full name: Whifflet Shamrock F.C.
- Nickname: the Dark Greens
- Founded: 1886
- Dissolved: 1895
- Ground: School Street Park
- Hon. Secretary: Patrick Kerr, D. M'Michael, James Mooney
- Match Secretary: P. M'Kay
Home colours

Whifflet Shamrock Football Club was a Scottish football team located in the town of Coatbridge, Lanarkshire, Scotland.

== History ==
The first match recorded for the club is a defeat at home to Whifflet Britannia in October 1886. The club turned senior by joining the Scottish Football Association in 1888 and it entered both the Scottish Cup and the Lanarkshire Cup for the first time in 1888–89.

The club was however entirely unsuccessful, with Albion Rovers already firmly established in Coatbridge. Its two Scottish Cup ties were both heavy defeats - 6–1 to Carfin Shamrock in 1888–89 and 12–0 to Royal Albert in 1889–90; the latter defeat on the heels of the club's biggest victory, an 8–1 win over a poorly-represented Cambuslang St Bride's. Its three entries in the Lanarkshire also all ended in defeat and the club never played in the consolation tournament.

After the introduction of the Scottish League in 1890–91, the club was moribund. Its last recorded fixture was a 5–0 home defeat to Hamilton Harp in February 1891. It entered the Scottish Cup until 1893–94, but did not play a tie, scratching in every season, including in its last appearance in the first round proper in 1890–91 to Summerton Athletic. The last entry in 1893–94 saw the club scratch to Carfin Shamrock. Its last Lanarkshire Cup tie was a defeat at Airdriehill in the first round in 1890–91 and it withdrew from the consolation competition.

The club does not seem to have played in 1892–93, 1893–94, or 1894–95, although it kept its Scottish Football Association membership going until 1894 and hosted a junior football tournament until 1892, but by August 1895, the club had definitely dissolved, "showing the effect that professionalism has had in the provinces".

== Colours ==
The club wore dark green shirts and black knickers.

== Ground ==
The club played at School Street Park.
