= Dalziel Park (stadium) =

Stadium in Motherwell, Scotland

Dalziel Park Stadium
- Location within North Lanarkshire
- Location: (Scotland) Motherwell, North Lanarkshire
- Coordinates: 55°47′8.42″N 3°59′11.33″W
- Owner: The Motherwell Football & Athletic Club Ltd.

Construction
- Opened: 1889
- Closed: 1895
- Demolished: 1895

Tenant
- Motherwell F.C.(1889–1895)

Dalziel Park Stadium was a football stadium located at Airbles Street and Glencairn Street in Motherwell, North Lanarkshire, that hosted the home matches of Motherwell, formed after a merger between Alpha and Glencairn. The first official match at the stadium was a 3–3 draw against Rangers. The exact capacity is unknown.

After three years playing at a site on Roman Road, Motherwell played at Dalziel Park until 1895. The club had turned professional the previous year, and the ground was considered unsuitable for professional football, with the surface being described as small and muddy. The ground had only one stand, a pavilion based on the west side. Baron Hamilton of Dalzell granted a lease of land in the northern part of his Dalzell Estate, half-a-mile away, where Motherwell built a new stadium, Fir Park, where they are based to this day. The last match at Dalziel Park was against Royal Albert on 31 May 1895, with income raised from the match used to fund the new stadium.

The old stadium was demolished and replaced by residential housing.

== Sources ==
- Wilson, Derek (2008). Motherwell FC On This Day. Pitch Publishing. ISBN 978-1-905411-37-5.
- Wilson, Derek (2009). Motherwell FC Miscellany. Pitch Publishing. ISBN 978-1-905411-37-5.
- Inglis, Simon (1996). Football Grounds of Britain. Collins Willow. ISBN 0-00-218426-5.
- Hay, Ian (2006). Football Grounds from the Air. Myriad. ISBN 1-904-736-56-4.
