= Hamilton Harp F.C. =

Association football club in Scotland

Hamilton Harp
- Full name: Hamilton Harp F.C.
- Nickname: the Harp
- Founded: 1890
- Dissolved: 1896
- Ground: West End Park
- Match Secretary: Patrick McInerney, John Lynas
Home colours

Hamilton Harp F.C. was an association football club from Hamilton, Lanarkshire, Scotland, active in the 1890s.

== History ==
The club was founded in 1890, after the demise of the previous Irish diaspora club in the town, Hamilton Hibernians. Shortly after formation the club had already amassed nearly a hundred members. It joined the Lanarkshire Association in May 1890 and the Scottish Football Association in August 1890. The first match for the club was a surprising 4–3 win in a friendly at Hamilton Academical the same month; however the Harp was bolstered by the presence of three Celtic players.

The Harp's first competitive match was in the first round of the 1890–91 Scottish Cup, at Uddingston, in a match that was expected to be tight. However the home side was 3–0 up at half-time and added another three, without reply, in the second half. The club's debut in the Lanarkshire Cup the same season was also unsuccessful, the club losing its two ties; 5–4 at Glengowan in the first round of the competition itself, in a game reported to be a "cracker", the winner coming in the final minute; and 8–0 at home to Motherwell in the Coatbridge Express Cup, which was a consolation competition for clubs eliminated from the main tournament.

The first senior season set the tone for the Harp's competitive career. The Scottish FA introduced qualifying rounds (and later the Scottish Qualifying Cup) for clubs to play through before playing in the Scottish Cup proper from the 1891–92 season, and Harp lost every tie it played until 1894–95, when it gained an unexpected 0–0 draw with Northern in the first round, losing in the replay. Even more surprisingly the Harp earned its only win in the competition the following season, 5–2 against the same club, considered "one of the best results of the day", but lost 3–1 at Annbank in the second round.

The Harp did not fare much better in the Lanarkshire Cup, only ever winning two ties in the main competition; 8–4 against Dykehead in 1892–93, and 4–3 against Glengowan in 1895–96 - the Glengowan tie seeing a fight between M'Namee of Harp and Griffin of Glengowan, for which they were both sent off, and suspended for a month. A Glengowan protest for crowd encroachment, and the winning goal being offside, was dismissed. By this second win, the decimation of senior clubs meant that the Harp reached the semi-final of the county cup, losing 4–0 to Motherwell in the last four, despite borrowing M'Keown from Celtic to play in goal.

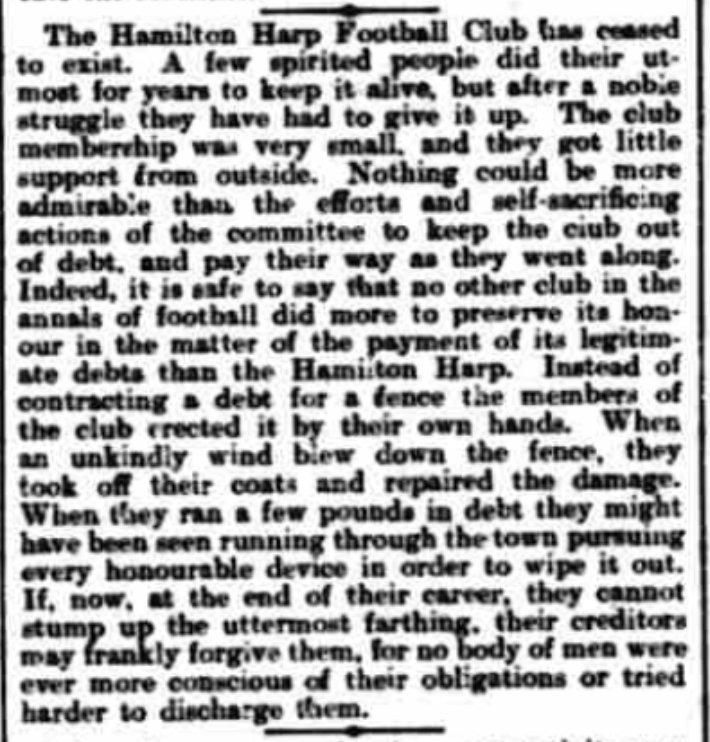
Dissolution of Hamilton Harp F.C., Hamilton Herald, 3 July 1896

The "decadence" of professionalism was too much for the Harp, and, although it formally "ceased to be" in August 1897, the club had dissolved in July 1896. The club's final act was writing to Cameronians to say that it was scratching from its 1896–97 Scottish Cup preliminary tie, allowing the Cameronians to arrange a friendly with Alloa Athletic. The club had hoped to turn to Junior status in 1896 but found the debt accrued too much of an obstacle. The final match for the club, in the Coatbridge Express Cup in April, summed up the club's issues - only 7 players turned up at Albion Rovers, so the Harp scratched, and borrowed four players for a friendly instead, which the Rovers won 6–2 despite an " altogether lifeless" display.

== Colours ==
The club originally wore white shirts and blue (serge) knickers, but briefly adopted blue and white shirts in March 1891 which appear to have been dropped by the start of the next season. From 1894 the club wore green shirts and white knickers.

== Ground ==
The club played at West End Park, owned by the council. Its first home match was against a 2–2 draw with Celtic XI in May 1890 in front of a "splendid" crowd.
