= Whitefield F.C. =

Association football club in Glasgow City, Scotland

Whitefield
- Full name: Whitefield Football Club
- Founded: 1877
- Dissolved: 1892
- Ground: Whitefield Park
- Capacity: 2,000
- President: W. Kinghorn
Home colours

Whitefield Football Club was a Scottish association football club based in Govan, now part of Glasgow.

== History ==
The club was founded on 3 November 1877. It first entered the Scottish Cup in 1878–79. Its first match in the competition - a 10–0 win over Telegraphists - would prove to be its biggest win in the competition.

Whitefield entered the Cup every season until 1892–93, although it scratched in 1888 before playing a tie; in 1888–89, it played its scheduled first round opponent, the 3rd Lanarkshire Rifle Volunteers, in a friendly instead.

The club survived in the shadow of Rangers longer than other clubs in Govan; indeed in 1885 it was strengthened by taking over another Govanite club, Dean Park. Whitefield however was never a successful side, only once reaching the third round of the Scottish Cup, in 1887–88. The club beat Linthouse in the first round and Pollokshields at home in the second, but lost 2–0 at Thistle, in front of a crowd of 3,000, in the third.

=== Local competitions and rivalry with Linthouse ===
The club had the same lack of success in the Glasgow Cup, the strongest of the local competitions. In six entries the club only won one tie. Its best run - to the quarter-final in 1892–93 - was thanks to a walkover and a bye.

On a district level the club was more successful. The club's highest profile honour was winning the Jubilee Cup in 1887–88. Whitefield beat neighbours Linthouse 2–1 away from home en route to the final, in a match which attracted a crowd of 2,000, and in the final (in front of 1,500, at Argyll Park) the club beat Kelvinside Athletic 4–0. The club's first match in defence of its Jubilee cup in December 1888 should have been the club's biggest competitive win, as Whitefield beat Govan Athletic 13–1; however the Athletics scratched from the competition before the match started, so it was played as a friendly instead.

The Govan Charity Cup was played in two seasons, in 1885–86 and 1886–87, and Whitefield won on both occasions. The triumph in 1887 was controversial, as the final tie with Linthouse was acrimonious. After a draw, it seemed that Whitefield had won the trophy by beating Linthouse 2–0 in a replay at Victoria Park (the home of Summerton Athletic). However Linthouse protested and in a further game at Victoria Park, in front of 2,000 fans, the Linties won 3–1. Whitefield put in a counter-protest and was awarded the trophy, possibly on the basis that the Linthouse protest had been invalid.

The clubs were drawn against each other in the first round of the 1887–88 Scottish Cup. The tie at Craigton Park was witnessed by 1,000 spectators and ended 3–3. Whitefield won the replay 2–1 at home, with Linthouse having players cautioned for violent play almost from the start, and "feelings ran high among the spectators" due to the "highly questionable tactics of the Linthouse".

The rivalry however swung in Linthouse's favour soon afterwards; in the Govan & Ibrox Cup of 1888–89, before another large crowd of 2,000, the Linties beat Whitefield 9–0, with all nine goals coming in the second half. When the Scottish Football Alliance was formed in 1891–92, Linthouse was a founder member, and Whitefield was left behind without a league competition.

=== Final matches ===
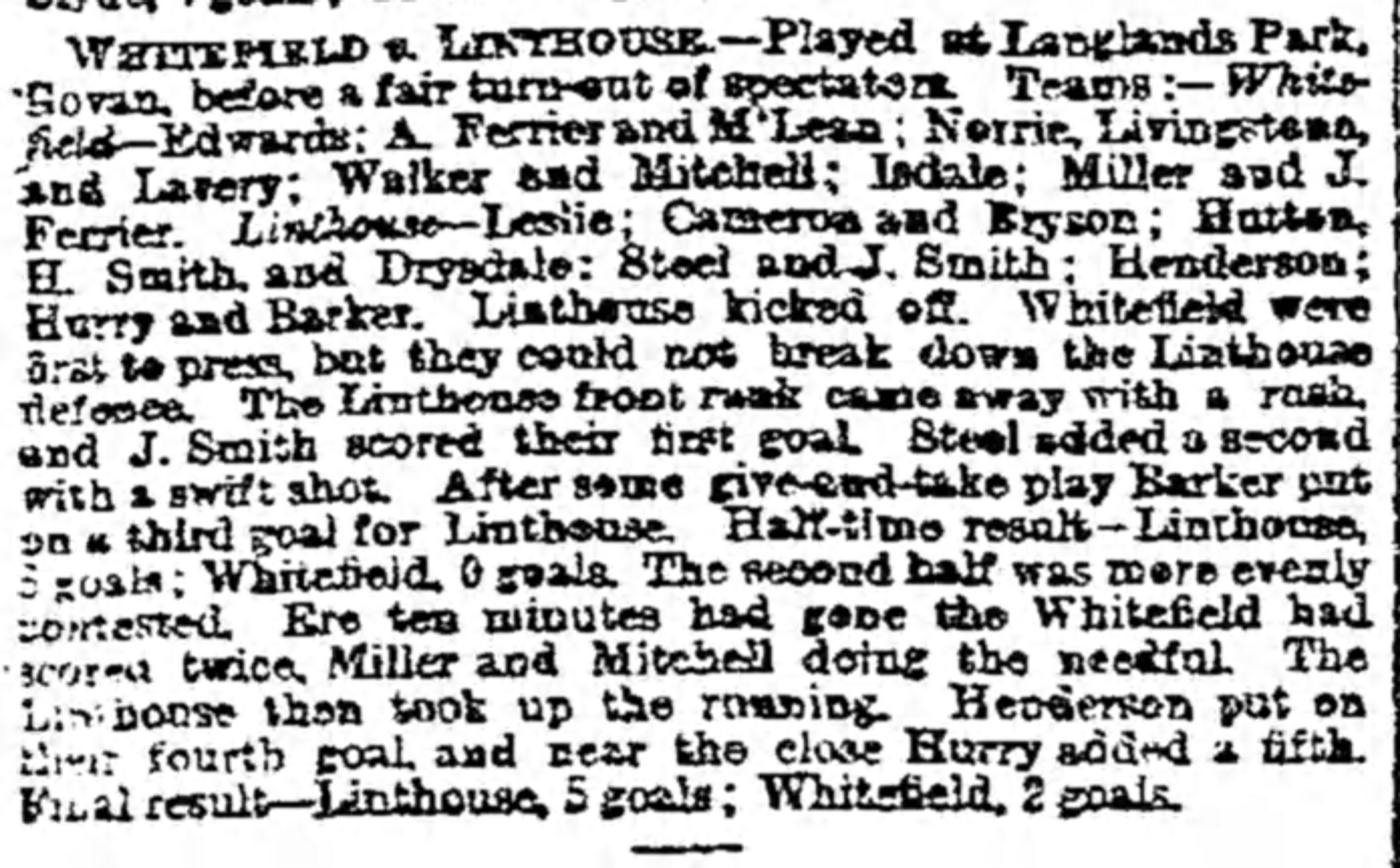
Linthouse 5–2 Whitefield, Glasgow Cup 1st Round, from the Glasgow Herald, 9 November 1891

Whitefield's final Scottish Cup ties came in the 1891–92 preliminary rounds. In the first preliminary round, the club beat Clydesdale of Rutherglen 7–0 in a replay, but lost 9–0 - the club's heaviest Scottish Cup defeat - at Battlefield in the second.

In the Glasgow Cup, the club's quarter-final tie with Linthouse was switched from Whitefield Park to Linthouse's Langlands Park, "owing to the big attraction", but at kick-off time Whitefield had not turned up; Linthouse therefore kicked a goal and claimed the tie. The two sides did play the tie properly the following week, with Linthouse winning 5–2.

The club had disbanded by the time the 1892–93 season started, so it could not take part in its first qualifying round match in the Scottish Cup. However, because opponents Summertown Athletic had also been wound up, some club members re-started the Whitefield to play a second round tie with Motherwell. On arrival at Motherwell, Whitefield scratched from the competition, and the clubs played out a friendly instead, Motherwell winning 3–0; this seems to have been Whitefield's final match. As was common with defunct clubs hoping for a revival or one final payday, the club entered both the Scottish Cup and Glasgow Cup in 1893–94, but scratched from both competitions before playing a match.

== Colours ==
The club's colours were originally blue jerseys and white knickers, the jerseys from 1879 being described as navy blue, with navy hose. In 1888 the club changed to a navy and white jersey, probably in hoops, and blue knickers.

== Ground ==
The club played at Whitefield Park, from which the club took its name, with an entrance on Copeland Road. This was a ground in Govan and not related to the home ground of Cambuslang. After 1892 the ground was used by the South Western Juniors side.

The clubhouse was a victim of burglary in 1886, two boys breaking in to steal three jerseys plus a pair of boots, a football, and a comb.

== Notable players ==
- Charlie Gorevin, one of the players in the first Celtic F.C. match in 1888
