= Rutherglen F.C. (1875) =

Former association football club in Scotland

Rutherglen
- Full name: Rutherglen Football Club
- Nickname: Ru'glen
- Founded: 1875
- Dissolved: 1891
- Ground: Phoenix Park
- Match Secretary: Allan McCall
- Hon Secretary: W. D. MacDonald
Home colours

Rutherglen Football Club was a Scottish football club based in Rutherglen, active in the 19th century.

== History ==
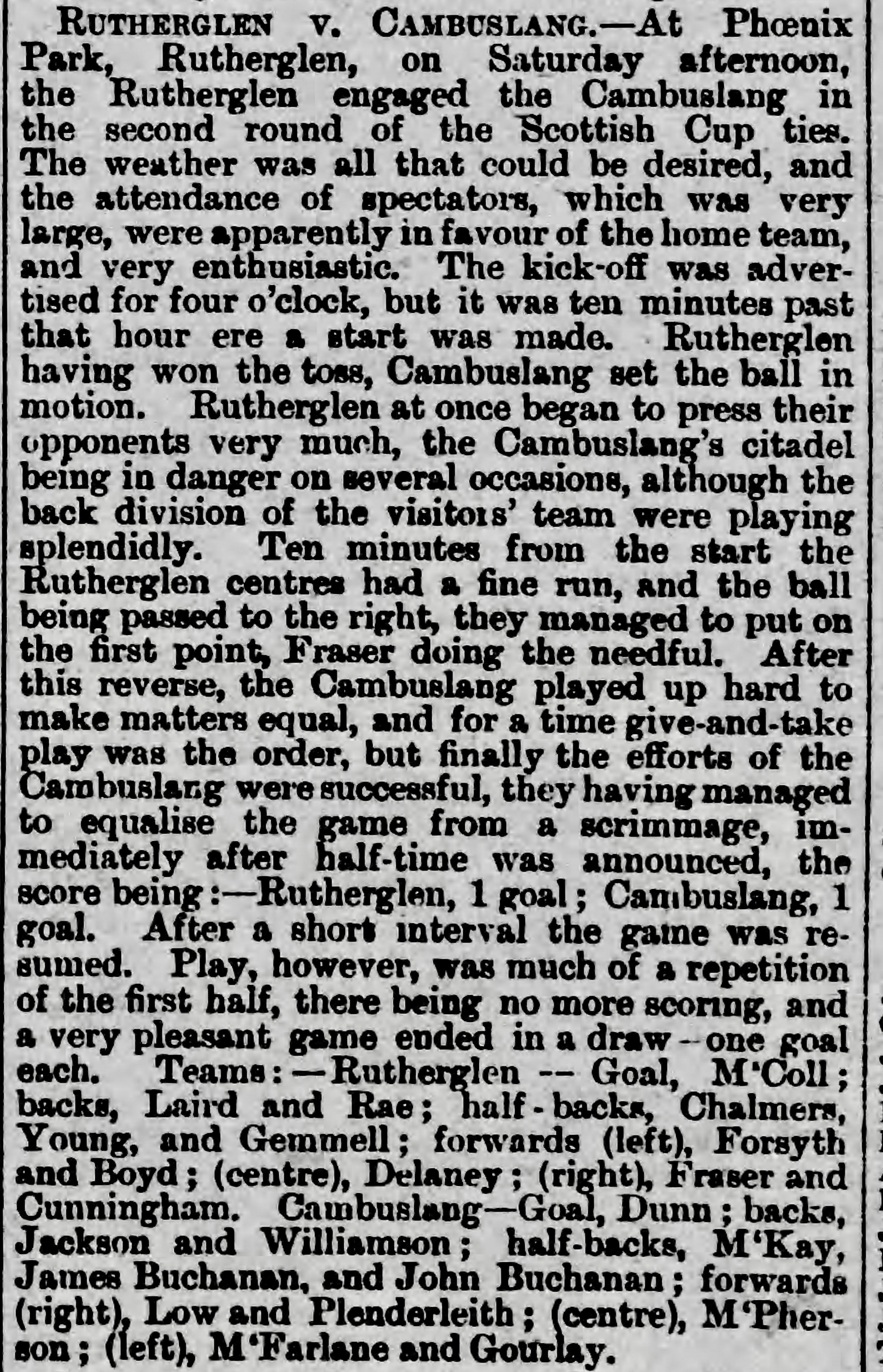
Report of the club's shock 1–1 draw with Cambuslang in the 2nd round of the 1886–87 Scottish Cup, Rutherglen Reformer, 8 October 1886

The club was founded in 1875, under the name Westburn. The club kept a low profile - so low that even a rare match report in 1881 got the result wrong - until joining the Scottish Football Association in 1884, and it entered the 1884–85 Scottish Cup. In the first round, the club won 6–2 at Tollcross in the first round, and lost 4–1 at Glengowan in the second.

In 1885, the club changed its name to Rutherglen. It continued to enter the Scottish Cup, but never got past the second round. Its best performance was in 1886–87, a first-round win over Drumpellier - Drumpellier protested in vain against rough play and the pitch conditions, forfeiting the 10/ protest deposit - giving the club a second round home tie with Cambuslang. Ru'glen held the future finalists to a draw in what was "without a doubt the greatest surprise of the day", and even had the balance of play. Cambuslang put matters right with a 6–1 win in the replay, but Ru'glen emerged from the tie with significant credit, having played "a brilliant game", and enjoying entertainment afterwards with the victorious players, as "harmony filled up the remainder of the evening". Unfortunately for the club its performance had attracted "agents" which resulted in a number of players leaving the club - by the first round the following season, it only had 3 of the regular season eleven left.

The only other times the club got to the second round were both due to first round ties with fellow Rutherglen club Clydesdale. In 1887–88, Rutherglen won 4–1 away from home; in 1888–89, both teams progressed after two draws.

Rutherglen entered the Lanarkshire Cup from 1884–85 until 1888–89. Its best run was to the quarter-final in 1885–86, which included beating Albion Rovers (twice after the original win was overturned, Ru'glen having turned up 25 minutes late, leaving the Rovers outside in driving rain), but lost at Airdrieonians; "Athlete" of the Rutherglen Reformer had predicted an 8–0 win for the 'Onians, and he was almost correct, Rutherglen scoring a 75th minute consolation.

Ru'glen had to withdraw from the competition in 1888–89 as a rejig of regions saw Rutherglen transferred to the auspices of the Glasgow Association, and it entered the Glasgow Cup from that season instead. However it lost all four of its ties in a tougher environment. Rutherglen twice reached the semi-final of the Glasgow North Eastern Cup, a low-grade contest which nevertheless attracted some high-class entrants. Both of the club's semi-final defeats were against clubs that would play in the Scottish League; Cowlairs in 1887–88 and Northern in 1889–90.

=== Merger failure and self-destruction ===
With Clyde, Cambuslang, and Thistle all in the neighbourhood of the town, the outlook for the smaller clubs in Rutherglen was not promising, especially as Rutherglen's tenancy was due to run out in 1892, and it had had great difficulties even finding that ground in 1887. The club therefore proposed a merger with Clydesdale, to take effect from the 1891–92 season. The Clydesdale committee agreed to form a new club (to be called Ruglonians) and to play at Clydesdale's Southcroft ground; however the Clydesdale members voted the proposal down on the basis that Clydesdale was at least solvent, unlike Rutherglen, and a merger would simply add to the debt for which the Clydesdale would be responsible.

The Clydesdale proposed that the Rutherglen members instead join the Clydesdale, which was met with dismay, especially given that Rutherglen claimed to have reduced its debts from £60 to £23, while Clydesdale's had been increasing. With catcalling on both sides, they both continued into 1891–92. Rutherglen lost 5–1 at Lochgair against Queen's Park in the Glasgow Cup, and entered the Scottish Cup in the new preliminary round stage.

Rutherglen drew a bye in the first preliminary round; in the second preliminary round against Annbank, Rutherglen persuaded Clydesdale goalkeeper Alexander Neil to play for Ru'glen, in return for his train fare and a shilling for lunch. The Rutherglen team list had him down as "McVee". Clydesdale took note as to what had happened and complained to the Scottish Football Association, on the basis that Neil had played for Clydesdale in its first preliminary round tie with Whitefield. The Rutherglen secretary (J. Anderson) explained that McVee had been chosen as goalkeeper, but could not play, so Neil played in goal as an emergency, and, as "he knew Annbank would win the tie", he "did not think they were doing much harm". The upshot was both Neil and Rutherglen were suspended. Although the club's suspension was for a month, there is no record of it playing again.

== Colours ==
The club wore black and white hooped jerseys. For its final season it wore light blue jerseys.

== Ground ==
The club played at Phoenix Park. In 1887, evicted from Phoenix Park and struggling to find a ground in the burgh, the club secured a 5-year lease at Lochgair, on Col. Buchanan's Eastfield estate, taking with it the paling and the clubhouse from Phoenix. The club opened the ground with a first round Scottish Cup against Albion Rovers, before an attendance of 1,200; the visitors won 6–3.

== Notable players ==
- "Spriggie" Rae, club captain in 1886–87, later a Scottish international when playing for 3rd L.R.V.
