= Clydesdale F.C. (1883) =

Clydesdale
- Full name: Clydesdale Football Club
- Founded: 1883
- Dissolved: 1892
- Ground: South Croft
- President: Harry McNeil
- Secretary: Matthew McIndoe
1883–87 colours	1887–91 colours

Clydesdale Football Club was a 19th-century football club based in Rutherglen, Scotland.

== History ==
The club was formed in 1883, and played its first competitive match in the Lanarkshire Cup in 1884. The club was part of the Temperance Movement and its members were teetotallers. The media occasionally referred to the club as Rutherglen Clydesdale to distinguish them from the other club of that name based further west closer to the centre of Glasgow.

Clydesdale started to enter the Scottish Cup in 1885–86, losing 4–2 at home to Tollcross in its first entry. The club entered every season until 1891–92 and never won a tie.

The club's peak (such as it was) came in the 1888–89 season. It reached the second round of the Scottish Cup, thanks to drawing twice against local rivals Rutherglen; under the rules of the competition at the time, both teams progressed after two draws. In the second round, Clydesdale visited Uddingston, and was 4–0 down at half-time, both sides scoring once in the second half. The club also reached the semi-final of the Lanarkshire Cup, albeit only thanks to a bye and a default, after the club had initially lost to Rutherglen in the quarter-final. In the semi-final, at Royal Albert of Larkhall, the young Clydesdale side took a shock lead with a shot from Rowan, but the Royalists equalized early in the second half after a long scrimmage, and took the lead with a goal which was "very much offside", and with Clydesdale effectively down to nine men through injuries, eventually went out 3–1.

The club finished the season with its one cup success, in a Lanarkshire Football Association invitational tournament which was meant to be played as a series of double-header ties in three separate geographical divisions, the aim to raise funds to buy a trophy for a second XI tournament; however most of the clubs withdrew, with the result that there were only two tournaments, with two entrants in each. The Motherwell branch final was then threatened by Motherwell withdrawing late on, but Clydesdale agreed to step in, to face Carfin Shamrock. "Contrary to all expectations" Clydesdale won 1–0.

Clydesdale had long struggled for crowds, with Rutherglen locals preferring the rival town side or the clubs in nearby Cambuslang. By the end of the 1890–91 season, the club was around £20 in debt, and the Rutherglen club proposed a merger. The Clydesdale committee agreed to form a new club (to be called Ruglonians) and to play at Southcroft; however the Clydesdale members voted the proposal down on the basis that Clydesdale was at least solvent, unlike the recently evicted Rutherglen side, and a merger would simply add to the debt for which the Clydesdale would be responsible. The proposal that the Rutherglen members simply join the Clydesdale club was met with dismay, especially given that Rutherglen claimed to have reduced its debts from £60 to £23, while Clydesdale's had been increasing.

However, before the start of the 1891–92 season the club was forced to hold a raffle in order to pay off its debts. Although the club managed a 2–2 draw at home to Whitefield in the first preliminary round of the Scottish Cup, the Govan side won the replay at home by either 6–0 or 7–0, easing off after scoring 5 in the first half, Clydesdale being handicapped by four of its players not turning up, and the four substitutes being "by no means shining lights".

Clydesdale's last recorded match in the Lanarkshire Cup was a 10–0 defeat at Wishaw Thistle in the second round, eight goals coming in the first half and goalkeeper Gibson being singled out for special praise. The club's last competitive match was a 12–0 defeat to Northern F.C. in the North-Eastern Cup in January 1892, a competition for clubs in the north and east of Glasgow, which the club had entered five times without ever winning a match.

The last record of the club is being drawn to play Hamilton Harp in the Coatbridge Express Cup (which functioned as the Lanarkshire Consolation Cup). The match was scheduled to take place on 26 March 1892, but was postponed, and never in fact took place, with Harp going through to the second round.

== Colours ==
The club originally played in navy shirts, white shorts, and red socks. From 1887 to 1891 it wore cream shirts and white shorts; for its final season, the club adopted all navy.

== Ground ==
The club played on the South Croft (also given as Southcroft) at Shawfield. By 1889 the ground had a pavilion with bathing facilities. The highest crowd at the ground was against Celtic in the North Eastern Cup on 29 December 1888, a match Celtic won 5–1. Southcroft was later the home of Rutherglen Glencairn (founded in 1896) for more than a century.
