= Kelvinside Athletic F.C. =

Former association football club in Scotland

Kelvinside Athletic
- Full name: Kelvinside Athletic
- Nickname(s): Christian Athletics, Young Men
- Founded: 1883
- Dissolved: 1893
- Ground: Kelburne Street
- Hon. Secretary: John M. M'Laren, D. D. Warren
- Match Secretary: John H. Chalmers, John D. Martin
G.U.Y.M.C.A.A.C. colours	1886–91 Kelvinside Athletic colours

Kelvinside Athletic Football Club was a 19th-century athletics club from Kelvinside in Glasgow, originally the footballing branch of the Glasgow United YMCA Athletic Club.

== History ==
The Glasgow branches of the YMCA had been involved in sports since the 1860s and in 1883 members formed an athletics club, the Glasgow United YMCA Athletic Club, which included a football side, as well as cricket, tennis, and gymnastics sections.

=== Football side ===
In the summer of 1883, the University of Glasgow football club, which had existed since 1877, and which had been a regular entrant of the Scottish Cup from 1878 to 1882, allowed its subscription to the Scottish Football Association to lapse. The YMCA football club - to which the media habitually referred as G.U.Y.M.C.A.A.C. - effectively took its place; it played 12 matches in the 1883–84 season and remained unbeaten, with 8 wins.

The club therefore joined the Scottish FA for the 1884–85 season, which entitled it to enter the Scottish Cup, and it did so for the competition that season. The club went down 6–4 to Northern at the latter's Hyde Park ground, having ceded the home advantage the draw had given the club. By the end of the season, the club was attracting friendlies against sides such as Alpha, which later became Motherwell.

For 1885–86, the club had expanded enough (with membership doubling to 120, making it one of the biggest clubs in Glasgow in terms of membership, with only Queen's Park, Rangers, and the 3rd Lanarkshire Rifle Volunteers boasting larger memberships) to join the Scottish Second XI Football Association. It also entered the Scottish Cup a second time, gaining a walkover victory against Eastern, but being drawn in the second round at home to the 3rd L.R.V., who, as well as being one of the few bigger sides, also had significantly more Cup experience. The Hi-Hi duly won 8–1.

=== Change to Kelvinside ===
Although the club still boasted 120 members in 1886, it did not enter the Scottish Cup under the G.U.Y.M.C.A.A.C. name; it continued playing other sports under that name, but for football and cricket changed its name to Kelvinside Athletic, which retained the Scottish FA membership.

Under the Kelvinside name, the club finally won a Scottish Cup tie for the first time in 1887–88, beating St Andrew's 6–3 in the first round. The club however never got past the second round; as professionalism increased, Kelvinside's amateurism was left behind. Although it was one of the better amateur clubs - it beat Govan Athletic 16–0 in the first round in 1888–89, two of the Govan players walking off the pitch after Stewart ran the length of the pitch from the start of the second half to score the club's seventh - it similarly fell well short of the more established sides in the area. The season after its record win, Kelvinside suffered its record defeat, 13–0 at Rangers. It also never got past the first round of the Glasgow Cup, although it did have some wins in competitions in Govan, losing the final of the 1887–88 Govan Jubilee Cup to Whitefield in front of 1,500 at Argyll Park.

The club appears to have given up the ghost after one final entry to the Scottish Cup in 1893–94, being drawn to face Hamilton Academical but was not able to play the tie after being removed from the Scottish FA register in August 1893.

== Colours ==
The club originally wore black and white one-inch striped jerseys with white knickers; in a throwback to earlier times, the club also specified a black and white cricket cap.

As Kelvinside, the club wore white shirts and blue knickers. In 1891 it changed its shirts to black and white, probably in hoops as other designs were normally specified in returns to the SFA.

== Ground ==
The club played at the Glasgow University YMCA Park, on Kelburne Street, in Kelvinside, taking over from the Glasgow Academical club. The ground was known as Kelburn Park from 1891.

== Notable players ==
- Jack Angus, scouted by Third Lanark after the clubs' Cup tie in 1888
