= 1892–93 Scottish Cup preliminary rounds =

Tournament details
- Country: Scotland
- Teams: 162

Tournament statistics
- Matches played: 143
- Goals scored: 914 (6.39 per match)

The preliminary rounds for the 1892–93 Scottish Cup took place between 3 September and 5 November 1892 to decide the 16 teams that would join the 16 exempt clubs in the first round.

A total of 162 teams entered the preliminary rounds which were open to all members of the Scottish FA.

After the completion of the four preliminary rounds which saw 914 goals scored across 143 matches, Aberdeen, Airdrieonians, Albion Rovers, Annbank, Broxburn Shamrock, Camelon, Campsie, Cowlairs, Dunblane, King's Park, Monkcastle, Motherwell, Queen of the South Wanderers, Royal Albert, Stenhousemuir and 5th Kirkcudbright RV advanced to the first round.

== Format ==
Alongside the four semi-finalists from the previous season, 12 further teams were voted to be exempt from competing in the preliminary rounds. The names of the remaining clubs were placed into lots according to their districts and drawn into pairs. The home team would be the first team drawn unless only one of the clubs in a pair had a private ground. In the event of a draw, the second team drawn would have the choice of ground for the replay. This process was repeated for the second and third preliminary rounds. All competing clubs were placed into a single lot for the fourth preliminary round.

=== Calendar ===
1892–93 Scottish Cup preliminary rounds calendar
Round	Date	Ties			Clubs
Round	Date	Original	Byes	Replays	Clubs
First preliminary round	3 September 1892	77	7	7	162 → 87 (Note: No team was eliminated in two ties which resulted in drawn replays and all four teams advanced.)
Second preliminary round	24 September 1892	41	5	7	87 → 47 (Note: No team was eliminated in one tie which resulted in a drawn replay and both teams advanced.)
Third preliminary round	15 October 1892	22	3	7	47 → 26 (Note: No team was eliminated in one tie which resulted in a drawn replay and both teams advanced.)
Fourth preliminary round	5 November 1892	10	6	0	26 → 16

=== Teams ===
At a committee meeting on 31 May 1892, the 16 teams to be exempt from the preliminary rounds were decided. By virtue of being semi-finalists in 1891–92, Celtic, Queen's Park, Rangers and Renton were the first to be exempt. Following a vote, Dumbarton, Heart of Midlothian, Leith Athletic, Kilmarnock, Clyde, 3rd Lanark RV, Abercorn, St Bernard's, St Mirren, Cambuslang, Linthouse and Northern were given an exemption from the preliminary rounds.

Competing teams arranged by district
Dunbartonshire, Stirlingshire and Clackmannanshire		East of Scotland and Fife	Forfarshire	Glasgow and Lanarkshire		Renfrewshire and Ayrshire	
Alloa Athletic; Alva; Bridge of Allan; Camelon; Campsie; Clackmannan; Clydebank; Clydebank Athletic; Dalmuir Thistle; Denny; Dunipace; Duntocher Harp; East Stirlingshire; Falkirk; Gairdoch; Grangemouth; Grasshoppers; Jamestown	Kilsyth Standard; Kilsyth Wanderers; King's Park; Kirkintilloch Athletic; Laurieston; Levendale; Methlan Park; Old Kilpatrick; Slamannan; Slamannan Rovers; Smithstone Hibs; Stenhousemuir; Tillicoultry; Union; Vale of Bannock; Vale of Leven; Vale of Leven Wanderers	Adventurers; Armadale; Bathgate Rovers; Bo'ness; Bonnyrigg Rose Athletic; Broxburn; Broxburn Shamrock; Cowdenbeath; Dunfermline Athletic; Edinburgh University; Kirkcaldy; Lassodie; Linlithgow Athletic; Lochgelly United; Mossend Swifts; Muirhouse Rovers; Penicuik Athletic; Polton Vale; Raith Rovers; Vale of Gala	Arbroath; Arbroath Wanderers; Brechin; Dundee East End; Dundee Harp; Dundee Our Boys; Forfar Athletic; Johnstone Wanderers; Kirriemuir; Lochee United; Montrose; Strathmore; Strathmore Athletic	Airdriehill; Airdrieonians; Albion Rovers; Battlefield; Burnbank Swifts; Carfin Hibernians; Carfin Shamrock; Carrington; Cowlairs; Dykehead; Fairfield; Glasgow Perthshire; Glasgow Wanderers; Glengowan; Hamilton Academical	Hamilton Harp; Kelvinside Athletic; Maryhill; Motherwell; Partick Thistle; Pollokshaws; Royal Albert; Shettleston Swifts; Southern Athletic; Summerton Athletic; Thsitle; United Abstainers; Whifflet Shamrock; Whitefield; Wishaw Thistle	Annbank; Arthurlie; Ayr; Ayr Athletic; Ayr Parkhouse; Beith; Bute Rangers; Cronberry Eglinton; Cumnock Springbank; Dalry; Dykebar; Galston; Girvan Athletic; Hurlford; Irvine; Johnstone	Kilbarchan; Kilbirnie; Kilmarnock Athletic; Lanemark; Lochwinnoch; Lugar Boswell; Mauchline; Monkcastle; Morton; Neilston; Newmilns; Port Glasgow Athletic; Saltcoats Victoria; Stevenston Thistle; 1st Argyll RV

Competing teams arranged by district
Aberdeenshire	Argyll	Northern Counties	Perthshire	Southern Counties
Aberdeen; Orion; Stonehaven; Peterhead; Victoria United	Inveraray; Lochgilphead; Oban; Oban Rangers	Clachnacuddin; Inverness Caledonian; Inverness Thistle; Inverness Union	Coupar Angus; Dunblane; Fair City Athletic; Our Boys; St Johnstone; Vale of Atholl; Vale of Ruthven	Annan; Douglas Rovers; Dumfries St John's; Gladstonians; Mid-Annandale; Moffat; Newton Stewart Athletic; Queen of the South Wanderers; Rising Thistle; St Cuthbert Wanderers; Sanquhar Rangers; Stranraer; 5th Kirkcudbright RV

== First preliminary round ==
=== Glasgow and Lanarkshire district ===
Glasgow and Lanarkshire district first preliminary round results
Date	Home team	Score	Away team	Venue
3 September 1892	Airdriehill	5–0	Burnbank Swifts	New Monkland, Airdrie
3 September 1892	Hamilton Academical	5–5	Motherwell	Douglas Park, Hamilton
3 September 1892	Cowlairs	7–0	Battlefield	Gourlay Park, Glasgow
3 September 1892	Glasgow Perthshire	2–17	Wishaw Thistle	Kelburn Park, Glasgow
3 September 1892	Albion Rovers	9–1	Shettleston Swifts	Meadow Park, Coatbridge
3 September 1892	Carrington	3–2	Dykehead	Hanover Park, Glasgow
3 September 1892	Thistle	2–4	Carfin Shamrock	Braehead Park, Glasgow
3 September 1892	Pollokshaws	2–1	Hamilton Harp	Maxwell Park, Pollokshaws
	Royal Albert	w/o (Note: Fairfield scratched and Royal Albert advanced to the second preliminary round.)	Fairfield	
	Partick Thistle	w/o (Note: Maryhill scratched and Partick Thistle advanced to the second preliminary round.)	Maryhill	
	Whitefield	w/o (Note: Both Summerton Athletic and Whitefield had disbanded ahead of the season but Whitefield later reformed and advanced to the second preliminary round.)	Summerton Athletic	
	Kelvinside Athletic	w/o (Note: Kelvinside Athletic scratched and Glengowan advanced to the second preliminary round.)	Glengowan	
	Southern Athletic	w/o (Note: Southern Athletic scratched and Airdrieonians advanced to the second preliminary round.)	Airdrieonians	
	Carfin Hibernians	w/o (Note: Whifflet Shamrock scratched and Carfin Hibernians advanced to the second preliminary round.)	Whifflet Shamrock	
	United Abstainers	w/o (Note: United Abstainers scratched and Glasgow Wanderers advanced to the second preliminary round.)	Glasgow Wanderers	

Glasgow and Lanarkshire district first preliminary round replay
Date	Home team	Score	Away team	Venue
10 September 1892	Motherwell	3–2 (protested) (Note: A protest from Hamilton Academical was upheld and a replay was ordered.)	Hamilton Academical	Dalziel Park, Motherwell

Glasgow and Lanarkshire district first preliminary round second replay
Date	Home team	Score	Away team	Venue
17 September 1892	Motherwell	5–2	Hamilton Academical	Dalziel Park, Motherwell

=== East of Scotland and Fife district ===
Raith Rovers and Edinburgh University received a bye to the second preliminary round.

East of Scotland and Fife district first preliminary round results
Date	Home team	Score	Away team	Venue
3 September 1892	Vale of Gala	0–10	Kirkcaldy	Hollybush, Galashiels
3 September 1892	Dunfermline Athletic	1–4	Armadale	East End Park, Dunfermline
3 September 1892	Bathgate Rovers	7–1	Adventurers	Boghead Park, Bathgate
3 September 1892	Mossend Swifts	2–1	Broxburn	Mossend Park, West Calder
3 September 1892	Lassodie	0–5	Cowdenbeath	Green Bank Park, Lassodie
3 September 1892	Linlithgow Athletic	4–1	Muirhouse Rovers	Captain's Park, Linlithgow
3 September 1892	Broxburn Shamrock	5–0	Bonnyrigg Rose Athletic	Shamrock Park, Broxburn
3 September 1892	Bo'ness	3–4	Polton Vale	Newtown Park, Bo'ness
3 September 1892	Penicuik Athletic	2–2	Lochgelly United	Kirkhill Park, Penicuik

East of Scotland and Fife district first preliminary round replay
Date	Home team	Score	Away team	Venue
10 September 1892	Lochgelly United	7–1	Penicuik Athletic	School's Park, Lochgelly

=== Renfrewshire and Ayrshire district ===
Renfrewshire and Ayrshire district first preliminary round results
Date	Home team	Score	Away team	Venue
3 September 1892	Dalry	0–7	Kilbarchan	Townend Park, Dalry
3 September 1892	Morton	7–1	1st Argyll RV	Cappielow, Greenock
3 September 1892	Irvine	4–6	Stevenston Thistle	Cochrane Park, Irvine
3 September 1892	Cumnock Springbank	1–1	Kilbirnie	New Station Park, Cumnock
3 September 1892	Ayr Parkhouse	4–0	Lanemark	Beresford Park, Ayr
3 September 1892	Saltcoats Victoria	5–1	Mauchline	Brewery Park, Saltcoats
3 September 1892	Annbank	11–2	Cronberry Eglinton	Pebble Park, Annbank
3 September 1892	Ayr	3–1	Beith	Somerset Park, Ayr
3 September 1892	Port Glasgow Athletic	5–0	Kilmarnock Athletic	Clune Park, Port Glasgow
3 September 1892	Johnstone	1–0	Hurlford	Cartland Bank, Johnstone
3 September 1892	Dykebar	0–2	Arthurlie	Thistle Park, Paisley
	Galston	w/o (Note: Lochwinnoch scratched and Galston advanced to the second preliminary round.)	Lochwinnoch	
	Ayr Athletic	w/o (Note: Ayr Athletic scratched and Monkcastle advanced to the second preliminary round.)	Monkcastle	
	Girvan Athletic	w/o (Note: Newmilns scratched and Girvan Athletic advanced to the second preliminary round.)	Newmilns	
	Bute Rangers	w/o (Note: Lugar Boswell scratched and Bute Rangers advanced to the second preliminary round.)	Lugar Boswell	

Renfrewshire and Ayrshire district first preliminary round replay
Date	Home team	Score	Away team	Venue
10 September 1892	Kilbirnie	5–1	Cumnock Springbank	Milton Park, Kilbirnie

=== Dunbartonshire, Stirlingshire and Clackmannanshire district ===
Bridge of Allan received a bye to the second preliminary round.

Dunbartonshire, Stirlingshire and Clackmannanshire district first preliminary round results
Date	Home team	Score	Away team	Venue
3 September 1892	Smithstone Hibs	7–0	Alloa Athletic	Haugh Park, Kilsyth
3 September 1892	King's Park	9–1	Tillicoultry	Forthbank Park, Stirling
3 September 1892	Slamannan Rovers	4–6	Vale of Leven	The Glebe, Slamannan
3 September 1892	Falkirk	5–1	Vale of Bannock	Brockville Park, Falkirk
3 September 1892	Dalmuir Thistle	2–4	Gairdoch	Castle Park, Dalmuir
3 September 1892	Stenhousemuir	1–0	Dunipace	Ochilview Park, Stenhousemuir
3 September 1892	Kilsyth Wanderers	4–0	Alva	Garrel Garden, Kilsyth
3 September 1892	Grasshoppers	3–3	Denny	Longcroft Park, Bonnybridge
3 September 1892	Kirkintilloch Athletic	2–2	Union	Townhead Park, Kirkintilloch
3 September 1892	Levendale	1–1	Camelon	Balloch Road, Jamestown
3 September 1892	East Stirlingshire	7–1	Slamannan	Merchiston Park, Bainsford
3 September 1892	Clackmannan	4–1	Clydebank	Chapelhill Park, Clackmannan
	Old Kilpatrick	w/o (Note: Old Kilpatrick scratched and Kilsyth Standard advanced to the second preliminary round.)	Kilsyth Standard	
	Campsie	w/o (Note: Clydebank Athletic scratched and Campsie advanced to the second preliminary round.)	Clydebank Athletic	
	Laurieston	w/o (Note: Jamestown scratched and Laurieston advanced to the second preliminary round.)	Jamestown	
	Grangemouth	w/o (Note: Methlan Park scratched and Grangemouth advanced to the second preliminary round.)	Methlan Park	
	Duntocher Harp	w/o (Note: Vale of Leven Wanderers scratched and Duntocher Harp advanced to the second preliminary round.)	Vale of Leven Wanderers	

Dunbartonshire, Stirlingshire and Clackmannanshire district first preliminary round replays
Date	Home team	Score	Away team	Venue
10 September 1892	Denny	1–1 (Note: The four teams involved in drawn replays advanced to the second preliminary round.)	Grasshoppers	Hill Park, Denny
10 September 1892	Union	6–1	Kirkintilloch Athletic	St James' Park, Dumbarton
10 September 1892	Camelon	2–2	Levendale	Victoria Park, Camelon

=== Forfarshire district ===
Johnstone Wanderers received a bye to the second preliminary round.

Forfarshire district first preliminary round results
Date	Home team	Score	Away team	Venue
3 September 1892	Dundee Harp	4–3	Montrose	East Dock Street, Dundee
3 September 1892	Dundee East End	4–1	Arbroath Wanderers	Carolina Port, Dundee
3 September 1892	Dundee Our Boys	4–3	Lochee United	West Craigie Park, Dundee
3 September 1892	Arbroath	15–0	Brechin	Gayfield Park, Arbroath
3 September 1892	Strathmore	3–4	Strathmore Athletic	Logie Park, Dundee
3 September 1892	Kirriemuir	0–10	Forfar Athletic	Newton Park, Kirriemuir

=== Aberdeenshire district ===
Aberdeen received a bye to the second preliminary round.

Aberdeenshire district first preliminary round results
Date	Home team	Score	Away team	Venue
3 September 1892	Victoria United	2–7	Orion	Chanonry Grounds, Aberdeen
	Peterhead	w/o (Note: Stonehaven scratched and Peterhead advanced to the second preliminary round.)	Stonehaven	

=== Northern Counties ===
Northern Counties first preliminary round results
Date	Home team	Score	Away team	Venue
3 September 1892	Inverness Caledonian	4–1	Inverness Thistle	Caledonian Park, Inverness
3 September 1892	Inverness Union	4–1	Clachnacuddin	Cemetery Road, Inverness

=== Perthshire district ===
Vale of Ruthven received a bye to the second preliminary round.

Perthshire district first preliminary round results
Date	Home team	Score	Away team	Venue
3 September 1892	Fair City Athletic	0–3	St Johnstone	Balhousie Park, Perth
3 September 1892	Vale of Atholl	3–7	Dunblane	Recreation Park, Pitlochry
3 September 1892	Our Boys	5–2	Coupar Angus	Lower Haughs, Blairgowrie

=== Argyll district ===
Argyll district first preliminary round results
Date	Home team	Score	Away team	Venue
3 September 1892	Inveraray	6–2	Lochgilphead	Winterton, Inveraray
3 September 1892	Oban	4–3	Oban Rangers	Glencruitten Park, Oban

=== Southern Counties ===
Annan received a bye to the second preliminary round.

Southern Counties first preliminary round results
Date	Home team	Score	Away team	Venue
3 September 1892	Queen of the South Wanderers	14–2	Gladstonians	Recreation Grounds, Dumfries
3 September 1892	Newton Stewart Athletic	1–6	5th Kirkcudbright RV	Holm Park, Newton Stewart
10 September 1892	Rising Thistle	2–6	Douglas Rovers	Innerfield Park, Lochmaben
	St Cuthbert Wanderers	w/o (Note: Sanquhar Rangers scratched and St Cuthbert Wanderers advanced to the second preliminary round.)	Sanquhar Rangers	
	Stranraer	w/o (Note: Mid-Annandale disbanded after the draw and Stranraer advanced to the second preliminary round.)	Mid-Annandale	
	Dumfries St John's	w/o (Note: Dumfries St John's scratched and Moffat advanced to the second preliminary round.)	Moffat	

== Second preliminary round ==
=== Glasgow, Lanarkshire, Renfrewshire and Ayrshire district ===
Monkcastle received a bye to the third preliminary round.

Glasgow, Lanarkshire, Renfrewshire and Ayrshire district second preliminary round results
Date	Home team	Score	Away team	Venue
24 September 1892	Wishaw Thistle	6–0	Ayr	Old Public Park, Wishaw
24 September 1892	Bute Rangers	4–4	Neilston	Meadowcap Park, Rothesay
24 September 1892	Port Glasgow Athletic	7–1	Saltcoats Victoria	Clune Park, Port Glasgow
24 September 1892	Pollokshaws	9–2	Glasgow Wanderers	Maxwell Park, Pollokshaws
24 September 1892	Annbank	10–3	Carrington	Pebble Park, Annbank
24 September 1892	Arthurlie	2–2	Airdrieonians	Dunterlie Park, Barrhead
24 September 1892	Ayr Parkhouse	2–0	Morton	Beresford Park, Ayr
24 September 1892	Carfin Shamrock	4–1	Airdriehill	Shamrock Park, Carfin
24 September 1892	Partick Thistle	3–1	Johnstone	Inchview, Partick
24 September 1892	Kilbirnie	2–3	Cowlairs	Milton Park, Kilbirnie
24 September 1892	Stevenston Thistle	16–0	Girvan Athletic	Warner Park, Stevenston
24 September 1892	Galston	5–2	Kilbarchan	Portland Park, Galston
24 September 1892	Albion Rovers	10–0	Carfin Hibernians	Meadow Park, Coatbridge
	Motherwell	w/o (Note: Whitefield scratched and Motherwell advanced to the third preliminary round.)	Whitefield	
	Royal Albert	w/o (Note: Glengowan scratched and Royal Albert advanced to the third preliminary round.)	Glengowan	

Glasgow, Lanarkshire, Renfrewshire and Ayrshire district second preliminary round replays
Date	Home team	Score	Away team	Venue
1 October 1892	Airdrieonians	6–3	Arthurlie	Broomfield Park, Airdrie
	Neilston	w/o (Note: Bute Rangers scratched and Neilston advanced to the third preliminary round.)	Bute Rangers	

=== East of Scotland, Dunbartonshire, Fife and Stirlingshire district ===
Edinburgh University received a bye to the third preliminary round.

East of Scotland, Dunbartonshire, Fife and Stirlingshire district second preliminary round results
Date	Home team	Score	Away team	Venue
24 September 1892	Raith Rovers	1–3	Smithstone Hibs	Stark's Park, Kirkcaldy
24 September 1892	Levendale	4–1	Bathgate Rovers	Balloch Road, Jamestown
24 September 1892	Union	6–0	Grasshoppers	St James' Park, Dumbarton
24 September 1892	Vale of Leven	3–6	East Stirlingshire	Millburn Park, Alexandria
24 September 1892	Polton Vale	2–2	Grangemouth	Loanhead Park, Loanhead
24 September 1892	Laurieston	1–5	King's Park	Zetland Park, Laurieston
24 September 1892	Clackmannan	4–3	Armadale	Chapelhill Park, Clackmannan
24 September 1892	Denny	0–1	Kilsyth Wanderers	Hill Park, Denny
24 September 1892	Cowdenbeath	6–2	Kirkcaldy	North End Park, Cowdenbeath
24 September 1892	Duntocher Harp	2–1	Mossend Swifts	St Helena Park, Duntocher
24 September 1892	Linlithgow Athletic	3–3	Gairdoch	Captain's Park, Linlithgow
24 September 1892	Stenhousemuir	6–1	Lochgelly United	Ochilview Park, Stenhousemuir
24 September 1892	Campsie	3–1	Falkirk	Alum Works Park, Lennoxtown
24 September 1892	Kilsyth Standard	0–6	Camelon	Balmalloch Park, Kilsyth
	Broxburn Shamrock	w/o (Note: Bridge of Allan scratched and Broxburn Shamrock advanced to the third preliminary round.)	Bridge of Allan	

East of Scotland, Dunbartonshire, Fife and Stirlingshire district second preliminary round replays
Date	Home team	Score	Away team	Venue
1 October 1892	Grangemouth	3–3 (Note: The two teams involved in the drawn replay advanced to the third preliminary round.)	Polton Vale	Caledonia Park, Grangemouth
1 October 1892	Gairdoch	6–0	Linlithgow Athletic	Main Street, Carronshore

=== Forfarshire and Perthshire district ===
Dundee Our Boys received a bye to the third preliminary round.

Forfarshire and Perthshire district second preliminary round results
Date	Home team	Score	Away team	Venue
24 September 1892	Vale of Ruthven	3–3	Strathmore Athletic	Auchterarder Public School Park, Auchterarder
24 September 1892	Johnstone Wanderers	3–3	Dundee Harp	Clepington Park, Dundee
24 September 1892	Our Boys	2–5	Arbroath	Lower Haughs, Blairgowrie
24 September 1892	Dunblane	2–0	St Johnstone	Duckburn Park, Dunblane
24 September 1892	Dundee East End	2–3	Forfar Athletic	Carolina Port, Dundee

Forfarshire and Perthshire district second preliminary round replays
Date	Home team	Score	Away team	Venue
1 October 1892	Vale of Ruthven	0–4	Strathmore Athletic	Auchterarder Public School Park, Auchterarder
1 October 1892	Dundee Harp	3–2	Johnstone Wanderers	East Dock Street, Dundee

=== Argyll district ===
Argyll district second preliminary round results
Date	Home team	Score	Away team	Venue
	Inveraray	w/o (Note: Oban scratched and Inveraray advanced to the third preliminary round.)	Oban	

=== Aberdeenshire district ===
Orion received a bye to the third preliminary round.

Aberdeenshire district second preliminary round results
Date	Home team	Score	Away team	Venue
24 September 1892	Aberdeen	9–2	Peterhead	Chanonry Grounds, Aberdeen

=== Northern Counties ===
Northern Counties second preliminary round results
Date	Home team	Score	Away team	Venue
24 September 1892	Inverness Union	1–2	Inverness Caledonian	Cemetery Road, Inverness

=== Southern Counties ===
5th Kirkcudbright RV received a bye to the third preliminary round.

Southern Counties second preliminary round results
Date	Home team	Score	Away team	Venue
24 September 1892	Douglas Rovers	2–2	Annan	Balmoral Park, Castle Douglas
24 September 1892	Stranraer	3–10	Queen of the South Wanderers	Westwood Park, Stranraer
24 September 1892	St Cuthbert Wanderers	6–4	Moffat	St Mary's Park, Kirkcudbright

Southern Counties second preliminary round replay
Date	Home team	Score	Away team	Venue
	Annan	w/o (Note: Douglas Rovers scratched and Annan advanced to the third preliminary round.)	Douglas Rovers	

== Third preliminary round ==
=== Glasgow, Lanarkshire, Renfrewshire, Ayrshire and Argyll district ===
Ayr Parkhouse received a bye to the third preliminary round.

Glasgow, Lanarkshire, Renfrewshire, Ayrshire and Argyll district third preliminary round results
Date	Home team	Score	Away team	Venue
15 October 1892	Royal Albert	6–0	Stevenston Thistle	Raploch Park, Larkhall
15 October 1892	Monkcastle	5–1	Neilston	Claremont Park, Kilwinning
15 October 1892	Airdrieonians	4–2	Carfin Shamrock	Broomfield Park, Airdrie
15 October 1892	Cowlairs	2–2	Galston	Gourlay Park, Glasgow
15 October 1892	Albion Rovers	4–2	Port Glasgow Athletic	Meadow Park, Coatbridge
15 October 1892	Pollokshaws	4–2	Wishaw Thistle	Maxwell Park, Pollokshaws
15 October 1892	Partick Thistle	2–2	Motherwell	Inchview, Partick
	Annbank	w/o (Note: Inveraray scratched and Annbank advanced to the fourth preliminary round.)	Inveraray	

Glasgow, Lanarkshire, Renfrewshire, Ayrshire and Argyll district third preliminary round replays
Date	Home team	Score	Away team	Venue
22 October 1892	Galston	0–2	Cowlairs	Portland Park, Galston
22 October 1892	Motherwell	3–3 (Note: The two teams involved in the drawn replay advanced to the fourth preliminary round.)	Partick Thistle	Dalziel Park, Motherwell

=== East of Scotland, Dunbartonshire, Fifes, Stirlingshire and Clackmannanshire district ===
Edinburgh University received a bye to the third preliminary round.

East of Scotland, Dunbartonshire, Fifes, Stirlingshire and Clackmannanshire district third preliminary round results
Date	Home team	Score	Away team	Venue
15 October 1892	Gairdoch	4–0	Polton Vale	Main Street, Carronshore
15 October 1892	Broxburn Shamrock	3–1	East Stirlingshire	Shamrock Park, Broxburn
15 October 1892	Campsie	3–3	Grangemouth	Alum Works Park, Lennoxtown
15 October 1892	Cowdenbeath	3–3	Stenhousemuir	North End Park, Cowdenbeath
15 October 1892	Camelon	4–1	Kilsyth Wanderers	Victoria Park, Camelon
15 October 1892	Levendale	4–2	Duntocher Harp	Balloch Road, Jamestown
15 October 1892	Union	2–3	Clackmannan	St James' Park, Dumbarton
15 October 1892	Smithstone Hibs	1–2	King's Park	Haugh Park, Kilsyth

East of Scotland, Dunbartonshire, Fifes, Stirlingshire and Clackmannanshire district third preliminary round replays
Date	Home team	Score	Away team	Venue
22 October 1892	Grangemouth	2–4	Campsie	Caledonia Park, Grangemouth
22 October 1892	Stenhousemuir	7–2	Cowdenbeath	Ochilview Park, Stenhousemuir

=== Forfarshire and Perthshire district ===
Forfarshire and Perthshire district third preliminary round results
Date	Home team	Score	Away team	Venue
15 October 1892	Dundee Our Boys	2–2	Dunblane	West Craigie Park, Dundee
15 October 1892	Arbroath	16–0	Strathmore Athletic	Gayfield Park, Arbroath
15 October 1892	Dundee Harp	2–2	Forfar Athletic	East Dock Street, Dundee

Forfarshire and Perthshire district third preliminary round replays
Date	Home team	Score	Away team	Venue
22 October 1892	Dunblane	5–2	Dundee Our Boys	Duckburn Park, Dunblane
22 October 1892	Forfar Athletic	3–2	Dundee Harp	Station Park, Forfar

=== Southern Counties ===
Southern Counties third preliminary round results
Date	Home team	Score	Away team	Venue
15 October 1892	St Cuthbert Wanderers	1–9	5th Kirkcudbright RV	St Mary's Park, Kirkcudbright
15 October 1892	Annan	1–3	Queen of the South Wanderers	Greenknowe, Annan

=== Northern Counties and Aberdeenshire district ===
Inverness Caledonian received a bye to the fourth preliminary round.

Northern Counties and Aberdeenshire district third preliminary round result
Date	Home team	Score	Away team	Venue
15 October 1892	Orion	3–3	Aberdeen	Cattofield, Aberdeen

Northern Counties and Aberdeenshire district third preliminary round replay
Date	Home team	Score	Away team	Venue
22 October 1892	Aberdeen	4–2	Orion	Chanonry Grounds, Aberdeen

== Fourth preliminary round ==
Airdrieonians, Annbank, Camelon, Cowlairs, Dunblane and Royal Albert received a bye to the first round.

Fourth preliminary round results
Date	Home team	Score	Away team	Venue
5 November 1892	Inverness Caledonian	2–5	Aberdeen	Caledonian Park, Inverness
5 November 1892	Pollokshaws	1–2	Albion Rovers	Maxwell Park, Pollokshaws
5 November 1892	Campsie	6–3	Arbroath	Alum Works Park, Lennoxtown
5 November 1892	5th Kirkcudbright RV	6–2	Ayr Parkhouse	Palmerston Park, Dumfries
5 November 1892	Motherwell	4–1	Levendale	Dalziel Park, Motherwell
5 November 1892	Stenhousemuir	8–3	Forfar Athletic	Ochilview Park, Stenhousemuir
5 November 1892	Broxburn Shamrock	4–3	Partick Thistle	Shamrock Park, Broxburn
5 November 1892	Queen of the South Wanderers	4–2	Clackmannan	Holm Quarry, Kilmarnock (Note: Match played at a neutral venue.)
5 November 1892	Gairdoch	1–3	King's Park	Gairdoch Park, Carronshore
	Monkcastle	w/o (Note: Edinburgh University scratched and Monkcastle advanced to the first round.)	Edinburgh University	
