= Strathmore Athletic F.C. =

Former association football club in Scotland

Strathmore Athletic
- Founded: 1889
- Dissolved: 1893
- Ground: Hillside
- Hon. Secretary: A. M. Lupton
- Match Secretary: A. N. M'Kenzie
Home colours

Strathmore Athletic F.C. was an association football club from Dundee, Tayside, active in the late 19th century.

== History ==
The original Strathmore Athletic side was the second XI of Dundee side Strathmore, which was active under that name in the 1880s. The senior Strathmore Athletic was founded as Strathmore Juniors in 1889 - confusingly, also the name of a side from Arbroath that had been active over the previous years - and changed its name to Strathmore Athletic in August 1891. Just to add to the confusion, this was also the name of a side from Aberdeen.

The club joined the Scottish Football Association in August 1892, joining an already overcrowded Dundee scene, which at the time included Broughty, East End, Harp, Lochee United, Our Boys, Strathmore, and Wanderers at senior level. The club also laboured under the disadvantage that, on joining, its new Hillside Park ground was not in a fit state, so it was not allowed to play ties at home.

Nevertheless, the club had an unexpectedly successful start in the 1892–93 Scottish Cup preliminary rounds, with a 4–3 win at Strathmore in the first round, the winner coming from a counter-attack after the older side had hit the post. A player named Osborne scored a hat-trick for Athletic, and his presence led to a protest from Strathie, on the basis that he had not been properly registered - the referee had noted his name as Osborne, but his surname was Steven, the player having given his middle name to avoid publicity. On Strathmore conceding that Osborne/Steven came from "a very respectable family" and had recently returned from Rangoon, the Scottish FA unanimously dismissed the protest.

In the second, the club had a 4–0 replay win at Vale of Ruthven putting the club into the third round. At that stage, the club was drawn to play Arbroath, and despite a reckoning that the Athletic "may be relied upon to give a good account of themselves", the Athletic was 6–0 down after 45 minutes and 16–0 down after 90.

The club played in the Forfarshire Cup that season, and won through its first tie against Kirriemuir after protesting a defeat on the basis that the ground was 9 inches too narrow. Its next tie, against the Harp, ended 8–1 to the "wearers of the green", but Athletic protested that the game had ended after 79 minutes because of darkness, and, to general disbelief the Association ordered a replay; perhaps not coincidentally this caused the postponement of a Northern League match between the Harp and East End. The Harp had no mercy at the second time of asking, kept the Athletic penned in its own half for the entire game, and won 11–0.

The club continued to the end of the 1892–93 season, finishing up with a defeat at Arbroath Wanderers in May, but the club had vanished without trace by the end of the month.

== Colours ==
The club wore royal blue jerseys and dark blue knickers.

== Ground ==
As Strathmore Juniors, the club played at Rollo's Pier. The club opened the Hillside ground at the start of the 1891–92 season with a 5–2 win over Our Boys of Alyth.
