= Angus F.C. =

Association football club in Angus, Scotland

Angus
- Full name: Angus Football Club
- Founded: 1880
- Dissolved: 1886
- Ground: Bankhead Farm
- Match Secretary: David Easton, George C. Nevay
Home colours

Angus Football Club was an association football club from Forfar in Scotland. Although it was entirely unsuccessful as a club, it was instrumental in the formation of Forfar Athletic.

== History ==
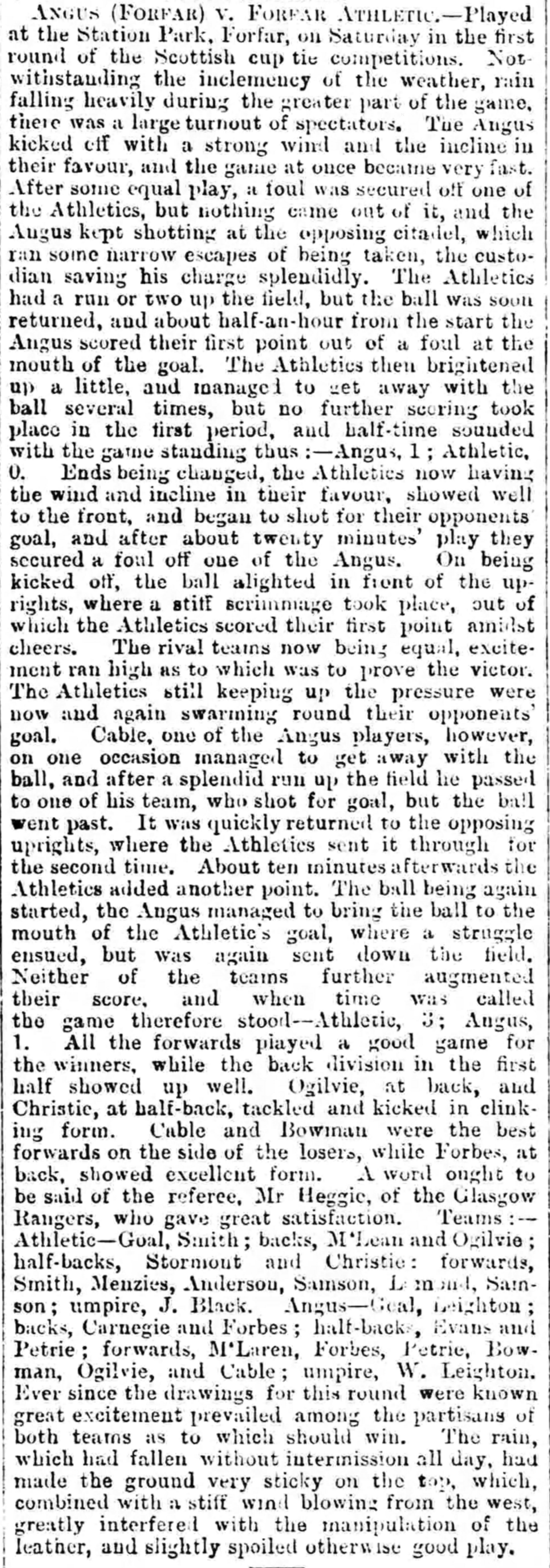
Forfar Athletic 3–1 Angus, Scottish Cup 1st round, 1885–86, from the Dundee Courier, 14 September 1885

The club was founded in 1880. Although the first club senior club in the town, it remained a small outfit for the first half of its existence; with 25 members in 1882, it was still the smallest senior club in Forfarshire.

Angus first entered the Scottish Cup in 1882–83, losing at home to Balgay 1–0, a second Balgay goal not being allowed as the goalposts had been knocked down in the struggle around the ball.

A one-goal defeat was Angus' best result in the competition. In 1883–84 the club went down 9–0 at the strong Dundee Harp side, and in the following season 5–1 at home to Dundee Strathmore. Angus was just as unsuccessful in its two Forfarshire Cup entries, losing 3–0 at home to Tay Bank of Dundee - a junior side - in 1884–85 and 2–0 at home to West End in 1885–86.

=== The cuckoo in the nest: Angus Athletic ===
Angus strengthened in September 1883 by taking over the Forfar East End junior club, the East End side becoming the Angus second XI, taking on the name of Angus Athletic. This meant that by 1884 Angus had 37 members, but was still much smaller than any of the Dundee clubs. The Angus Athletic took part in junior and second XI competitions in the county; in 1884–85 the Athletics finished as runner-up in the Forfarshire Second XI cup, losing 4–1 to the Dundee Harp reserves in the final.

The Athletics also occasionally played senior sides in friendlies. In 1884–85, the Athletics played the nearby Lindertis side on at least three occasions, with wins of 4–2 and 6–1 (at home) and 7–0 away.

=== Forfar Athletic formation and demise of Angus ===
Senior football grew hugely in Forfar in 1885. Angus increased its membership to 60. However, towards the end of the season, the Angus Athletic split away to form a new club, Forfar Athletic. Its last match as Angus Athletic was a 5–4 win over the Alpine club of Arbroath on 2 May 1885; its first recorded match as Forfar Athletic was against Our Boys Rangers of Dundee on 16 May 1885. The Forfar match secretary (James Black) had been the East End secretary in 1883, and Angus' honorary secretary the previous season. The new club acquired 40 members before the 1885–86 season started.

The Athletics joined the Forfarshire Football Association in June, alongside the Angus. The key match between the sides came in the first round of the 1885–86 Scottish Cup. It was Forfar's first match in the competition; it proved to be Angus' last. Angus had warmed up for the match with a rare big win the previous week, 5–1 at Dalhousie, and took the lead in the tie, but did not take enough advantage of having the conditions in its favour in the first half, and went down 3–1. On the Forfar side, eight of the players - Ogilvie, Christie, Stormont, Smith, Menzies, Anderson, Samson, and Lamond - had played for Angus Athletic in the Second XI Cup final the previous season, and one more player (Black) was the Forfar nominated umpire for the tie. None of the Angus Athletic players was playing for Angus.

The result of the tie switched momentum to the new club. By 1886, Angus was stuck on 60 members, while the Athletic had risen to 150 members, and was one of the biggest clubs in the county. The nail was driven in at the Forfarshire Cup; Angus went out in the first round while Forfar reached the semi-final.

Angus nearly had one slight moment of retribution against Forfar, in a friendly on 7 November 1885 at Station Park, in which Angus was 3–1 up at half-time and still 4–3 up early in the second half; however, the play was "brought to an abrupt conclusion" and the match abandoned.

Given this sweeping rise of a rival club, Angus shut up shop. its final reported match was a 7–2 defeat at Montrose in November 1885, and it was struck off the association membership roll for non-payment of subscriptions in August 1886.

== Colours ==
The club played in 2" hooped blue and black jerseys and hose, with white knickers.

== Grounds ==
The club's ground was originally at Bankhead Farm, 5 minutes' walk from Forfar railway station owned by Andrew Christie. When the club decided to move, it presented Mr Christie with a portrait. The Angus Athletic reserves played on Market Muir.

In the 1884–85 season, the club moved to Station Park, shared with the new Forfar Athletic club. The first match reported match played there, with the "wet and sloppy" pitch described as "a field behind the station", was an Angus Athletic game against Partick Thistle at the start of 1885, which ended in a 1–1 draw.
