= Lochee F.C. =

Former association football club in Scotland

Lochee
- Full name: Lochee Football Club
- Nickname: the Athletics
- Founded: 1884
- Dissolved: 1890
- Ground: South Road Park
- Hon. President: the Rev. Thomas Lennie
- President: William Morrison
- Match Secretary: Thomas Hill
Home colours

Lochee Football Club was a Scottish association football club based in Lochee, part of Dundee.

== History ==
The club was founded in 1884. Lochee made its competitive debut in the Forfarshire Cup in 1885, losing 11–1 at Montrose. The result was the start of a trend, as the club's exit from the county competition was usually down to a heavy defeat:

- 1886–87, second round, 15–0 at home to Dundee Harp;
- 1887–88, first round, 7–0 at Wanderers;
- 1888–89, semi-final, scratched;
- 1889–90, first round, 14–0 at Arbroath, the half-time score being 2–0 and the Lochee collapse being "totally unexpected", and the goalkeeper was praised for his "good game, the score being no indication of the play".

The club did at least have the consolation of two five-goal victories, 5–0 against the 3rd Forfar Rifle Volunteers in 1886–87 (with all five goals coming in the second half) and 8–3 against Friockheim in 1888–89.

Although the club did reach the semi-final in 1888–89, that was after only playing one tie. The club was drawn to play at Arbroath, but, finding difficulties in raising a team, obtained a postponement of the tie for a week, and still could only turn up with 9 players. Williamson from Arbroath offered to assist but Lochee formally scratched and, with another substitute, Lochee played out an hour-long friendly, which ended 5–1 to Arbroath.

The club's record in the Scottish Cup was little better. Its first entry, in 1887–88, ended in the first round with a 7–0 defeat at Dundee Wanderers, with the score being 0–0 at half-time but 5–0 by the 55th minute. Lochee did win its first round ties in 1888–89 (3–2 at Orion of Aberdeen) and 1889–90 (4–1 at home to Brechin), but lost in the second round both times. In 1888–89 the club lost 4–2 at Our Boys of Dundee, at one point coming from 3–0 down to 3–2 and only failing to equalize through "unmitigated bungling". The club's final tie in 1889–90 was a 7–1 defeat at home to Forfar Athletic, Hutton scoring Lochee's only goal when already five down, and the club's weak half-back line being blamed for the defeat.

Lochee's final competitive fixture was in March 1890; a 6–2 defeat at Dundee Wanderers in the Dundee Burns Club Charity Cup, a competition for Dundee sides in which Lochee had taken part from 1886 but in which it had never won a match.

At the end of the 1889–90 season, Lochee claimed to have a "balance on the right side" despite "the many difficulties the club had to contend against" , but the club did not undertake any activities over the summer or arrange any friendlies, and, when turning up at East Dock Street to play Dundee Harp for the first round of the 1890–91 Scottish Cup, announced its withdrawal; the clubs played out a friendly, which Harp won 5–1.

The club played one final match afterwards (a 4–0 friendly defeat at Fair City Athletics). On 17 September 1890, a meeting at the Weavers' Hall took place, between those "favourable to the formation of a new football club"; those present founded a new side, Lochee United, wearing similar colours to Lochee, playing at South Road Park, and expressed hopes that "the majority of the old Lochee players will be found in the ranks of the new club"; the Rev. Lennie took up the post of Honorary President in the new club, although other executive roles were filled by a new team. The new club made its first appearance against Broughty on 27 September 1890 and the original Lochee ended.

== Colours ==
The club played in black and white hoops with white shorts.

== Ground ==
The club's first ground was Wellgrove Park, in the west of Lochee. By 1886 the club had moved to an athletics ground at South Park Road.
