= Argyllshire Cup =

- Founded: 1889
- Abolished: 1891
- Region: Argyllshire
- Number of teams: 8
- Most successful club(s): 1st A.R.V. (Dunoon)

The Argyllshire Cup was an association football cup competition for clubs in the county of Argyllshire, Scotland.

== Format ==
The competition was a knock-out tournament contested by the member clubs of the Argyllshire Football Association. As a senior competition, it attracted entries from the senior clubs in the county:

- 1st A.R.V.
- Campbeltown Athletic
- Inveraray
- Lochgilphead
- Oban
- Balaclava/Oban Rangers

Entries also came from Dunselma in 1889–90 and 1890–91, and Kintyre in 1890–91.

== History ==
The Argyllshire Football Association was founded in 1889, and the draw for the first competition was made in the Crown Hotel, Oban, in November. Inveraray's Cup tie with Oban Rangers was its first-ever football match in the competition.

The competition was only held twice. The winner both times was the 1st Argyll Rifle Volunteers side from Dunoon. The Volunteers beat Oban 3–1 in the first final at the original Ibrox Park in April 1890. In the second, at Cappielow Park in March 1891, it beat a Campbeltown Athletic side, denuded of its best players by work commitments, 5–0.

The 1st A.R.V. withdrew from the Argyllshire association after the final, complaining about the travel expenses and the lack of reimbursement from the association, on the basis that "the whole thing is meant for Oban", and joined the Buteshire Association. Although there was some disgruntlement as to the town of Oban carrying most of the association expenses, it was agreed that the county was too large and sparsely populated to sustain a county-wide association, and the competition was never held again.
