= Carfin Shamrock F.C. =

Former association football club in Scotland

Carfin Shamrock
- Full name: Carfin Shamrock Football Club
- Nicknames: the Shamrock, the Bhoys
- Founded: 1885
- Dissolved: 1895
- Ground: Byres Knowe Park
- Capacity: 6,000
Home colours

Carfin Shamrock F.C. was a Scottish football team, from the village of Carfin in Lanarkshire. Although the club only existed from 1885 to 1895, it reached the last 16 of the Scottish Cup, and provided a number of footballers who played for clubs in the Football League and Scottish League.

== History ==
The club was founded in 1885 and entered the Lanarkshire Cup in its first season. It entered the Scottish Cup for the first time in 1886–87. The club lost 11–0 at Greenock Morton in the fourth round on front of 1,100 spectators.

The club reached the fifth round in 1887–88, which that season marked the last 16, and was the furthest the club reached in the competition. In the fifth round the club lost 5–2 at Wanderers of Dundee, even though the Wanderers had to play the last 30 minutes with 10 men due to injury.

The Bhoys reached the fourth round again in 1889–90. The club's third round tie at Northern of Springburn was abandoned with the Shamrock 2–1 down because of crowd violence, which spilled onto the pitch, and saw the referee and some players injured. The Scottish FA ordered a replay at Ibrox Park, which the Shamrock won 4–3, in a match "singularly free from rough play", thanks to Breslin finishing off after a "splendid run" from Naughton with just 30 seconds to go. The Shamrock lost 4–2 at Moffat, at one point reducing a 3–0 lead to 3–2.

The club's most remarkable achievement however was holding Celtic to a draw in the 1890–91 Scottish Cup, at Celtic Park, scoring two goals in the final few minutes to secure a 2–2 scoreline. Celtic won the replay at Byreknowes Park 3–1. Later in the season the club beat Royal Albert by two goals to secure the Airdrie Charity Cup for the only time. It was a particularly resilient achievement by Shamrock, as early in 1890 a number of players left the club for the newly-formed Motherwell Shamrock.

The rise of Celtic, which was a greater attraction for fans and players (the Shamrock's Eddie Pearson played in Celtic's first-ever match), and the creation of league competitions, were disastrous for Shamrock, which never secured a place in a league, and was reduced to playing only in cup competitions.

=== Two Shamrocks, the Hibernians, and the end of the club ===
Another blow was losing the right to play at Byresknowes Park at the end of the 1890–91 season, which seems to have caused a split in the club; not only did this result in the formation of a new club, Carfin Hibernians, wearing the same green and white (albeit with hoops rather than stripes), and who managed to secure Byres Knowe Park for the season, ), but two Carfin Shamrocks. One Shamrock was led by a Mr Johnston (who had the minute books and papers, and a ground lease near to the Hibernians' ground), and one Shamrock led by a Mr R Timmeny (who had lately been elected secretary of the Shamrock and claimed to have found a new ground), with both claiming the right to play under the Shamrock name. Mr Timmeny won the argument, partly on the basis that the Lanarkshire FA thought Mr Johnston might have been running a sham operation in order to secure the status of the Hibernians, so Mr Johnson was ordered to call his club Carfin Unknowns, and membership to the Lanarkshire FA was refused; no more is heard of his operation.

Given the confusion, Shamrock lost its Scottish FA membership; after the Timmeny faction had won out, the club was allowed back into the Scottish Football Association, and did try to enter the Scottish Cup at the third qualifying round, but was refused permission to do so.

Although there were reports that Shamrock and Hibernians had "rubbed noses" at the end of the 1891–92 season, they remained separate. Shamrock did enter the 1892–93 Scottish Cup preliminary rounds, losing 4–2 at Airdrieonians in the third. The following year, Shamrock gained a bye in the first round, but some of its players played for Carfin Hibernians in their first round tie at Cowlairs, under the mistaken assumption that the game could be treated as a friendly. The upshot was that many of the Shamrock players were now Cup-tied and the club therefore scratched from the second round. To prevent such an occurrence again, and given the lack of success for either side, the clubs merged under the name Carfin, at the Byresknowes ground.

The club thereupon had something of an Indian summer, with a surprise 5–3 win at an unsettled Albion Rovers in the first round of the Scottish Qualifying Cup, and holding Kilmarnock to a 4–4 draw in the second round, before going out 4–2 in the replay. Shamrock's very last match was a 7–3 defeat at Airdrieonians in the final of the Airdrie Charity Cup, at the end of the 1894–95 season, not helped by having to use substitutes in place of three players who had not turned up. The club did not pay its subscription to the Scottish Football Association for the 1895–96 season and was therefore struck off the register. The club was not revived, players joining other local clubs, Mason and M'Farlane for example joining Airdrieonians.

=== Controversies ===
The club's first Lanarkshire Cup tie in 1885–86 saw the Shamrock beat Royal Albert by 9 goals to 1. However the Royalists protested that Shamrock had "borrowed" three players from Alpha of Motherwell who were Cup-tied, having already played in the Scottish Cup for Alpha, and therefore were not eligible for the competition. The match was replayed and Royal Albert won 6–0.

The Shamrock gained an early notoriety for violence on the pitch. In the club's first Scottish Cup run, Shettleston protested unsuccessfully about rough play after Carfin had won in their first round tie, and Airdrieonians also did so after their second round tie; the Plains club also protested after their Lanarkshire Cup tie in the same season, after a match which saw the Shamrock introduce "the game of fisticuffs" after the Plains left-half-back had been carried off with a broken leg after a foul on him. Slightly ironically, Airdrieonians had beaten Shamrock 3–2 in the second round of the Scottish Cup, but the Scottish FA reversed the result on considering two counter-protests from Shamrock; firstly, that the winning goal had come when there were some people on the pitch, and, secondly, one of the Onians (Sharp, who had "quarrelled with the Clyde", and whose identity the Clyde club apparently passed on to the Shamrock) had not been registered with the club for the required one month before the tie.

After losing 11–0 at Morton in the fourth round, Shamrock protested against the Greenock side's rough play; however the referee gave evidence that "any rough play came at the hands of the Shamrock half-backs", and the Shamrock lost its 10s protest deposit.

In the 1889–90 Lanarkshire Cup, the Shamrock beat Wishaw Thistle 9–1 in a replay, but an appeal (seemingly because of a delay to the kick-off for want of a ball) saw another replay, which also ended in a draw; with the competition stalled, Wishaw proposed re-drawing the second round in toto, and, when that was voted down, withdrew. Shamrock lost its second round tie at Royal Albert and protested against the state of the ground, and that the umpires were neutral; this protest was dismissed.

A different type of controversy came out of the club's triumph in the Coatbridge Express Trophy in 1889–90. This competition was later known as the Lanarkshire Consolation Cup and was for clubs who had been knocked out of the Lanarkshire Cup in the early rounds. For the final of the Trophy against Motherwell, Carfin borrowed four reserves from Celtic, who had only played second XI football during the season, so were not barred by the rules of the Lanarkshire Cup. Carfin duly won 4–1 and survived a protest, although the relevant tournament rule was amended afterwards to prevent players who had played in second XI tournaments from playing for other clubs. As a consequence of the rule change, the Shamrock refused to defend its trophy after losing 7–1 to Airdrieonians in the main competition's semi-final.

The club's new ground in 1892 caused problems because of the pitch markings; both Airdriehill and Motherwell protested Cup defeats, the former on the basis that the touchlines were not in place (and also that local fans threw stones at the players as they left the village), the latter on the basis that the centre circle and the six yard penalty curves around the posts were missing, but there were lines across the pitch at the 6, 12, and 18 yard lines.

One unfortunate incident in 1886 which was not the club's fault was that many spectators who had attended a match advertised as Fence Rovers v Carfin Shamrock at Kirkmuirhill were disappointed to find that the visiting club was not the Carfin Shamrock, but the Craigneuk Shamrock; the Fence Rovers secretary had not known there were two Shamrock sides in the same area.

== Colours ==
The club played in striped shirts and black shorts for its existence, the stripes being black and white initially, changing to red and white vertical in 1888, and to green and white from 1890.

With the change of name to Carfin, the club changed its colours, to white shirts and black knickers.

The club's change colour was dark blue.

== Grounds ==
The club played at Byres Knowe Park, described as "a perfect quagmire". The highest attendance was 6,000 for the Cup tie with Celtic on 4 October 1890.

In 1891 the club was forced to move to a new ground simply called Shamrock Park; on the demise of Hibernians, the club moved back to Byres Knowe.

== Notable players ==
- Pat Breslin, future Scotland international
- Paddy Gallacher, later of Celtic and Preston North End
- Hughie Clifford, later of Stoke
- William Mason, later of Heart of Midlothian F.C. and Nottingham Forest
- Felix Mooney, who turned professional and joined Ardwick
- Chippy Naughton, later of Hibernian F.C.
- Jerry Reynolds, enticed away from Shamrock by Celtic before he could be Cup-tied
