= Campbeltown Athletic F.C. =

Association football club in Argyllshire, Scotland

Campbeltown Athletic
- Full name: Campbeltown Athletic Football Club
- Founded: 1885
- Dissolved: 1891
- Ground: Castleacres
- Secretary: Charles A. Douglas
Home colours

Campbeltown Athletic Football Club was an association football club from Campbeltown, Argyllshire, and the only club from the area to have entered the Scottish Cup.

== History ==
The earliest recorded match for the club is a 2–0 win over the Campbeltown Rangers at Kinloch Park in May 1885.

The club made an impact by winning the Campbeltown Charity Cup in 1887, and beating Morton 6–4 in a home friendly, although Morton won the return friendly 10–1. It dipped its toe into senior football by joining the Scottish Football Association in August 1888, but scratched from its first round Scottish Cup tie with Oban, and left the Scottish FA the following season.

It did however take part in the two editions of the Argyllshire Cup, losing to 1st A.R.V. in both competitions. In 1889–90, the clubs met in the semi-final at the Showfield, the game ending 3–3; Campbeltown protested about the "vacillation of an incompetent referee" who was "a round man in a square hole when acting as a referee", albeit in vain, and the Volunteers won the replay 3–2, with a goal in the last three minutes.

In 1890–91, the clubs met in the final. There were however very few entrants in the two tournaments; the Athletics' only other tie was a 5–0 win in 1890–91 over a Kintyre side reduced to 8 men by the end of the match. The Athletics' problem in the final was getting a team together; while the Volunteers could rely on military orders, the Athletics' side was made up of fishermen and sailors who had more pressing duties. Goalkeeper Mathieson - a crew member on a smack - had to sail through a storm from Lamlash in order to get to the final, held at Cappielow Park, so it was a distinctly second-choice Athletic which lost 5–0. Perhaps because of the difficulties in raising a side, no more is heard of the team after the end of the season.

== Colours ==
The club wore royal blue jerseys and dark blue knickers.

== Ground ==
The club's ground was the Showfield, on Castleacres.
