= Motherwell Shamrock F.C. =

Former association football club in Scotland

Motherwell Shamrock
- Full name: Motherwell Shamrock F.C.
- Nickname: the Shamrock
- Founded: 1890
- Dissolved: 1892
- Ground: Ladywell Park
- Secretary: John Timminey, James Rodgers
Home colours

Motherwell Shamrock F.C. was an association football club from Motherwell, Lanarkshire, active in the early 1890s.

== History ==
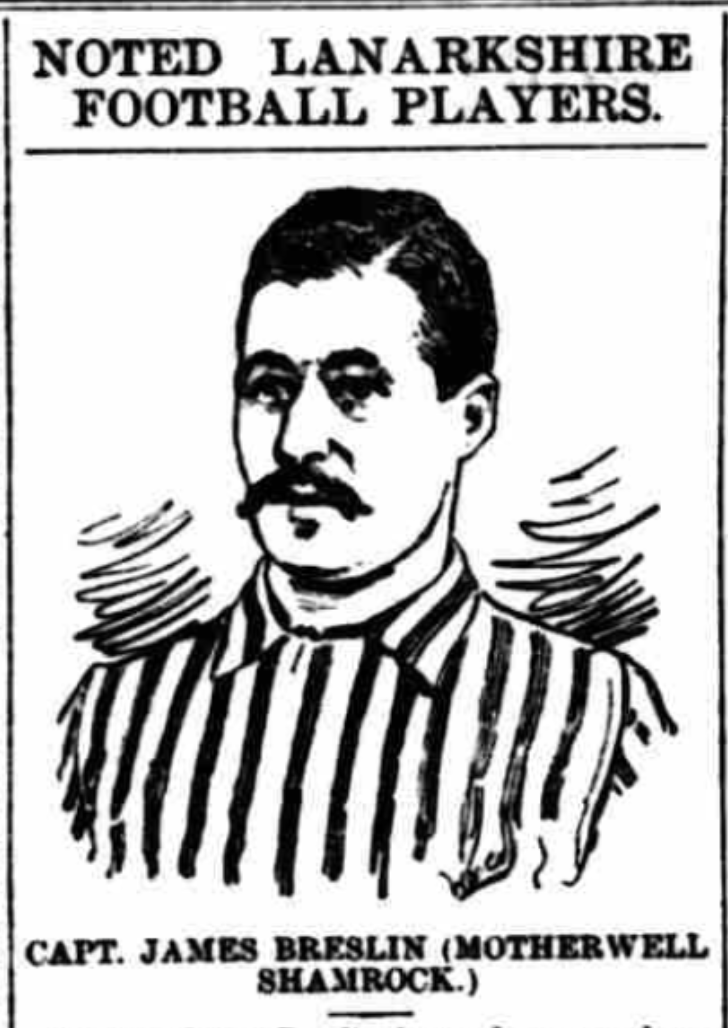
James Breslin (Motherwell Shamrock), Hamilton Herald, 30 May 1890

The club was formed in early 1890 as a split from Carfin Shamrock; the club's first secretary, John Timminey, had been Carfin's secretary in 1889, and Carfin captain (and club co-founder) "Dodger" Breslin threw in his lot with the new club. The club's first match was against a Glasgow select in April 1890, watched by the Celtic President, who was checking to ensure none of the Celtic players was appearing for a rival Irish diaspora club without permission.

The Motherwell side tried to get an invitation to the Airdrie Charity Cup, on the basis that it now had a large number of Carfin players, but the charity committee stayed loyal to the Carfin; in any event, under the rules of the competition, the Motherwell players were mostly Cup-tied, for having represented Carfin in other tournaments in the earlier part of the season.

The Shamrock joined the Scottish Football Association in August 1890 and was expected to win its debut Scottish FA Cup tie the next month at home to the little-regarded Fairfield club of Glasgow, but the visitors scored five in the first half and ran out 7–3 winners. Perhaps worse for Motherwell was that Carfin Shamrock held Celtic to a draw in the second round.

Two months later, Shamrock held Albion Rovers to a draw in its first Lanarkshire Cup tie, due to the Rovers "skylarking" when in an easy two-goal lead, but lost 8–1 in the home replay, and scratched from its entry to the Consolation Cup to "no surprise". The club's moment had passed before it was even founded; the rise of League football, the unexpected continuance (at least temporarily) of Carfin, and the all-encompassing growth of Celtic were all mortal blows to the Shamrock. The club had already lost its ground to Dalziel Rovers in March 1891, and ceased to exist at the close of the 1890–91 season, although an attempt to revive the name saw an application for re-admission to the Scottish FA in August 1892, to no avail.

== Colours ==
The club wore green and white vertically striped shirts, and dark blue knickers.

== Ground ==
The club's ground was Ladywell Park.
