= Arbroath Amateurs F.C. =

Association football club in Angus, Scotland

Arbroath Amateurs
- Founded: 1911
- Dissolved: 1921
- Ground: Lochlands Cricket Ground
- President: David Littlejohn Sr
- Match Secretary: D. A. Mitchell
1919–21 colours

Arbroath Amateurs F.C. was an association football club from Arbroath, Forfarshire, active in the 1910s.

== History ==
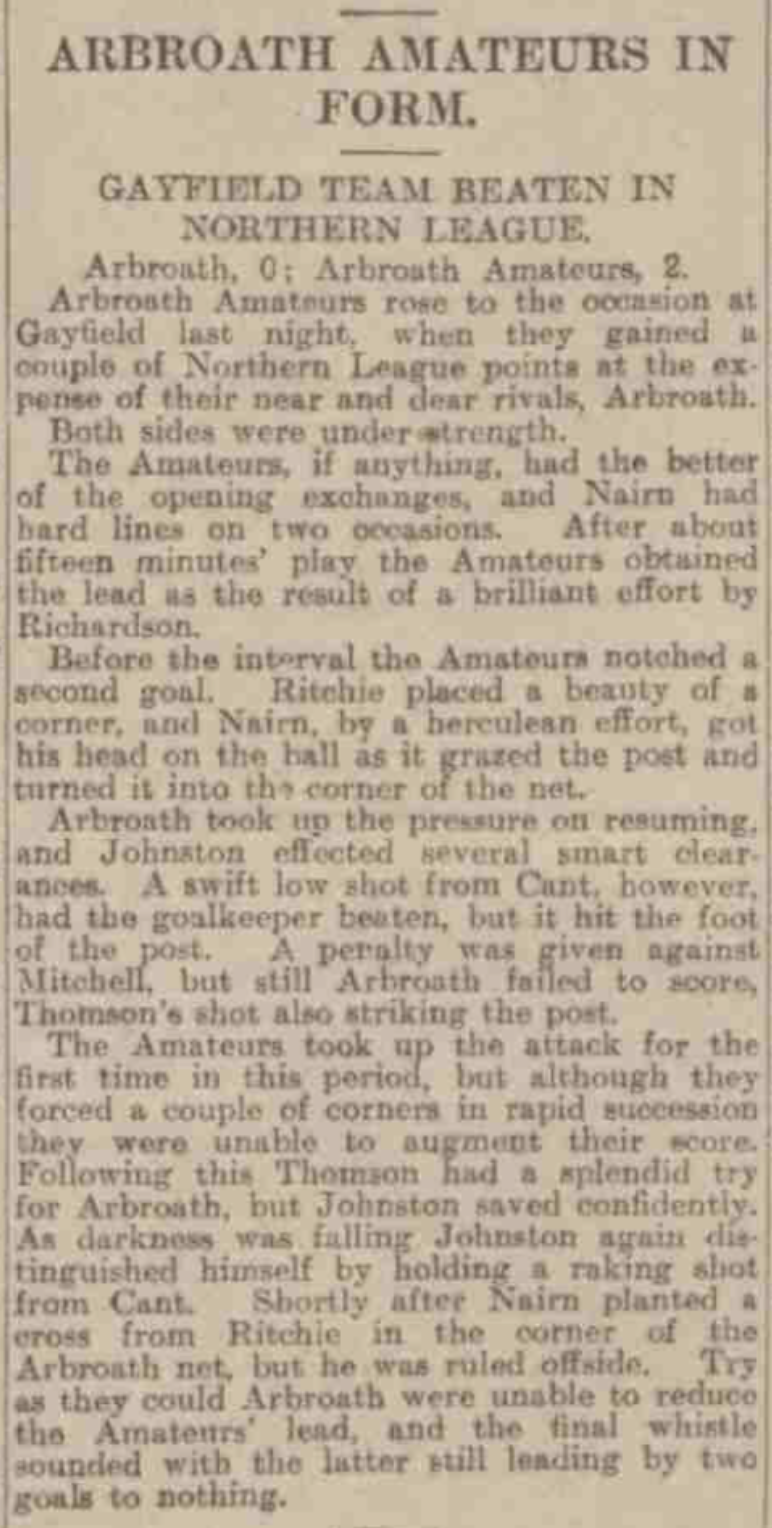
The Amateurs' most remarkable win, 2–0 at Arbroath in the 1912–13 Northern League, Dundee Courier, 24 April 1913

The club was founded in September 1911 and it joined the local association, and the Scottish Football Association, in 1912. The club was disbanded in September 1914 for the duration of the First World War, as a number of its players were amongst the earliest volunteers - 22 by mid-September. The club re-emerged in July 1919.

Given the club's amateur stance in an era of professionalism, and with Arbroath F.C. in the same town, it was not formed with the sole aim of on-field triumph. It entered the Scottish Qualifying Cup and Forfarshire Cup from 1912–13 until 1920–21, but lost every tie it played. The club also played in the Northern League from 1912–13 until 1919–20, but was always either bottom or close to it, and in its final season it stopped playing after conceding 22 goals in 3 matches.

The club's final match was a 4–0 defeat to Brechin City in the Forfarshire Cup on 3 January 1921, and two months later the club gave up the hopeless struggle, donating the £10 balance in its account equally between Brechin City and Montrose. The club was, in effect, replaced in 1922 by Arbroath Athletic, which was similarly unsuccessful.

== Colours ==
The club wore the following colours:

- 1911–13: maroon and light blue
- 1913–15: black and white
- 1919–21: white

== Ground ==
The Amateurs used the Lochlands cricket pitch (previously used by Arbroath Wanderers as its base, but played its more lucrative matches, such as League and occasional Cup matches, at Arbroath's Gayfield.
