= Balgay F.C. =

Former association football club in Scotland

Balgay
- Full name: Balgay Football Club
- Founded: 1881
- Dissolved: 1884
- Ground: Blackness Park
- President: J. Arthur
- Secretary: Robert Kidd
1881–83 colours	1883–84 colours

Balgay Football Club was an association football club from Balgay, a suburb of Dundee, Scotland.

== History ==
Although the club claimed a formation date of 1880, it was actually founded in December 1881. After a successful half-season, in which the club won 10 of its 16 matches, the club turned senior by joining the Scottish Football Association.

This entitled the club to enter the 1882–83 Scottish Cup. In the first round, Balgay won 1–0 at Angus of Forfar, a second Balgay goal not being allowed as the goalposts had been knocked down in the struggle around the ball. In the second the club went down 5–3 at Our Boys. Towards the end of the season, Balgay was one of the founder members of the Forfarshire Football Association, Kidd of Balgay being elected to the committee.

The club entered the Scottish Cup a second time in 1883–84 and was placed in the second round, under the rule that, after two draws, both clubs involved would progress; in Balgay's case, it obtained two draws with Strathmore of Arbroath. By a double coincidence, the club was drawn to play the other Strathmore of Dundee in the second round of the competition, and in the first round of the new Forfarshire Cup, both games taking place in successive weekends in September 1883. The first game, in the Forfarshire, ended 9–0 to Strathmore, which meant there was not much interest in the Scottish Cup tie the following week, only a small crowd attending Magdalen Park. Balgay surprised the home side by scoring the first goal, but conceded a quick equalizer, and went down 3–1.

The switch to senior football was too late for Balgay, with, in the 1883–84 season, four clubs in the town larger than Balgay. The club seems to have given up after a 10–1 defeat to Strathmore (Dundee) in March 1884. It did not re-emerge for the 1884–85 season, being struck from the SFA membership list in August for non-payment of subscription. A different junior Balgay club played a handful of games in 1885–86.

== Colours ==
The club originally wore 1½" maroon and drab jerseys and hose, with white knickers. In 1883 it changed its jerseys and hose to black.

== Grounds ==
The club's first ground was Blackness Park, 10 minutes' walk from Dundee railway station. In 1883 it moved to Fleuchar Craig Park.

The use of Blackness Park for football had an unexpected afterlife as the "cursing and swearing, the blasphemous and filthy language used during their matches baffl[ing] description, and would not be believed unless one had been a witness of it" was used as a ground for opposing Dundee Wanderers using Stirling Park as its home in 1886.
