= 1st Argyll Rifle Volunteers F.C. =

Association football club in Argyllshire, Scotland

1st A.R.V.
- Full name: 1st Argyll Rifle Volunteers Football Club
- Nickname: the Volunteers
- Founded: 1889
- Dissolved: 1894
- Ground: Dunoon
- Secretary: W. Cavers
Home colours

The 1st Argyll Rifle Volunteers F.C. was an association football club from Dunoon, Argyllshire, active in the 1890s.

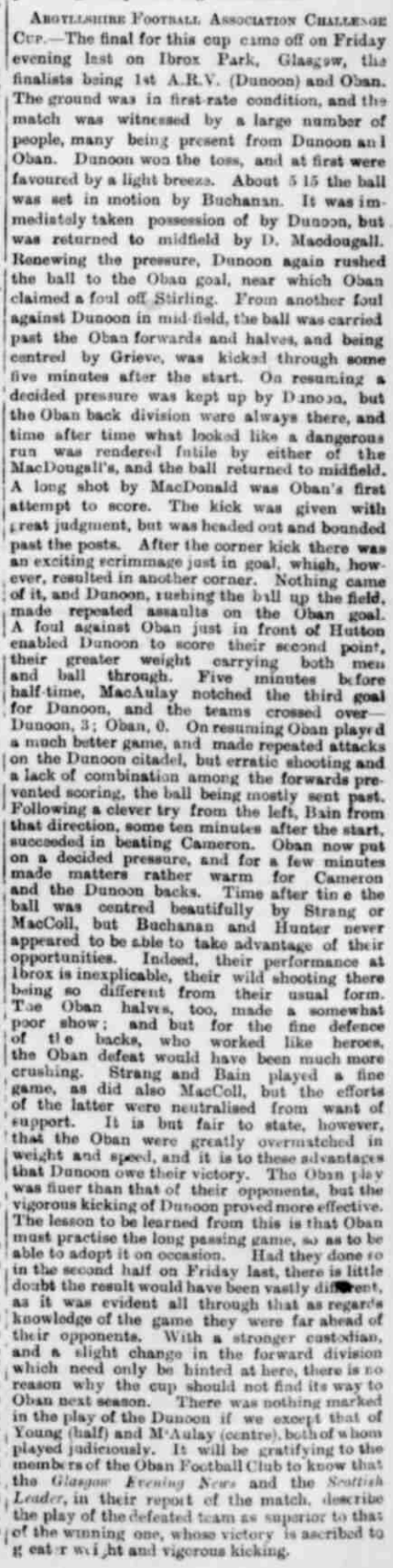
1889–90 Argyllshire Cup Final, 1st A.R.V. 3–1 Oban, Oban Times, 12 April 1890

== History ==
The club was formed out of the 1st Argyll and Bute Artillery Volunteers, a company in the Volunteer movement of the British Army. The 1st Argyll was formed in 1880, after a reforming of various companies within the Argyll and Sutherland Highlanders.

The club was one of the founder members of the Argyllshire Football Association and won the local Cowal Association Cup in its first season. It took part in the two editions of the Argyllshire Cup, the first of which was played in the 1889–90 season. Despite four of the other entrants having been senior clubs which had entered the Scottish Cup, the Volunteers won the competition, beating Oban F.C. 3–1 in the first final at the original Ibrox Park in April 1890. The club had survived a protest from Campbeltown Athletic in the semi-final, angry at supposedly poor refereeing which had cost it the semi-final.

In the second, at Cappielow Park in March 1891, the club had a walkover against Inveraray in the semi-final, who failed to turn up for the tie. In the final it beat a Campbeltown Athletic side, denuded of its best players by work commitments, 5–0.

The 1st A.R.V. withdrew from the Argyllshire association after the final, complaining about the travel expenses and the lack of reimbursement from the association, on the basis that "the whole thing is meant for Oban", and joined the Buteshire Association. In doing so, the club also joined the Scottish Football Association, meaning the club could play in the Scottish Cup. However, the difference in standard between the local area and the national stage was far too big to bridge. The club entered three times, from 1891–92 to 1893–94, and lost heavily in the first qualifying tie each time - 10–0 at Kilbarchan in 1891, 7–1 at Morton in 1892 (albeit only 2–1 down at half-time), and 6–0 at Cartvale in 1893. The club was struck off the Scottish Football Association roll in 1894 and never played at a reportable level afterwards.

== Colours ==
The club wore black and white hooped shirts and blue knickers.

== Ground ==
The club's ground was in Dunoon, possibly the Public Park off Sandbank Road, near the Drill Hall.
