= Lochgilphead F.C. =

Defunct association football club in Scotland

Lochgilphead
- Full name: Lochgilphead Football Club
- Founded: 1884
- Dissolved: 1893
- Match Secretary: A. Carswell, W. C. Harvey
Home colours

Lochgilphead Football Club was a Scottish association football club based in the town of Lochgilphead, Argyll.

== History ==
The club was founded in 1884 out of a cricket club, its earliest recorded match being a win over the Lochgilphead Fishermen's Football Club in December 1885. The club joined the Scottish Football Association in August 1887, once it had a ground to use. It entered the 1887–88 Scottish Cup, but was beaten 9–1 at home by the more experienced Oban F.C.

The club's embarrassment at its Cup debut spurred the team into several weeks of training before its first tie in the 1888–89 Scottish Cup, at home to the new Balaclava Rangers club; the visitors being further handicapped by a "very wet hour's drive" in a brake from Crina'n, and having to supplement the side with schoolboys because of player non-availability. Lochgilphead had a 7–1 lead at half-time, and ultimately won 15–1. Three players scored hat-tricks - J. Watson (with 5), D. Macvean (with 4), and J. Maccallum. As compensation Lochgilphead stood its visitors to tea in the Argyll Hotel afterwards. The margin of victory suggested that Lochgilphead could handle Oban in the second round, but returned home with a 4–2 defeat.

The club scratched to Oban in the 1889–90 Scottish Cup due to the £15 cost of travel, and a preference to focus on the new Argyllshire Cup, which provided more chance of success. The club however was drawn at Oban in the first round of the county competition, and the home side won 5–3.

Lochgilphead lost at Inveraray in the first round of the 1890–91 and it did not enter the last Argyllshire Cup. From the 1891–92 season the Scottish FA introduced qualifying rounds for the Scottish Cup; Lochgilphead entered for two seasons, but scratched in 1891–92, and lost 6–2 at Inverarary in 1892-93.

The defeat was the club's last competitive match. The remoteness of the village kept matches to a minimum; in 1890–91 the club only had 4 games, winning and losing 2 each, while even the Oban clubs were able to play 17 (Rangers) and 26 (Oban) times in the season. The £24 rent for the field (the cost and upkeep being met by no more than 18 members) was also crippling, and the "golf crase" which had "caught on" in Lochgilphead was proving to be more attractive to the club members. A meeting in November to urge the club on to greater effort was to no avail and at a meeting on 12 April 1893 the club committee agreed to give up Bank Park and dispose of the pavilion. The club's last action was to play a friendly at Inveraray the following day - Lochgilphead signed off with a 3–1 win.

== Colours ==
The club originally wore blue and white 1" hooped shirts with blue knickers, similar colours to the other senior club in the county. In 1892 the club kept the same colours, but changed the direction of the hoops to "perpendicular" stripes.

== Ground ==
Lochgilphead originally did not have a permanent ground, but in 1887 had permission from Campbell of Achindarrach to play at Bank Park, and that arrangement was made more permanent from 1888.
