= Fairfield F.C. (Scotland) =

Association football club in Glasgow City, Scotland

Fairfield
- Full name: Fairfield Football Club
- Founded: 1884
- Dissolved: 1894
- Ground: Argyle Park
- Secretary: George Williams, R. M'Nair
Home colours

Fairfield Football Club was a Scottish association football club based in Govan, now part of Glasgow.

== History ==
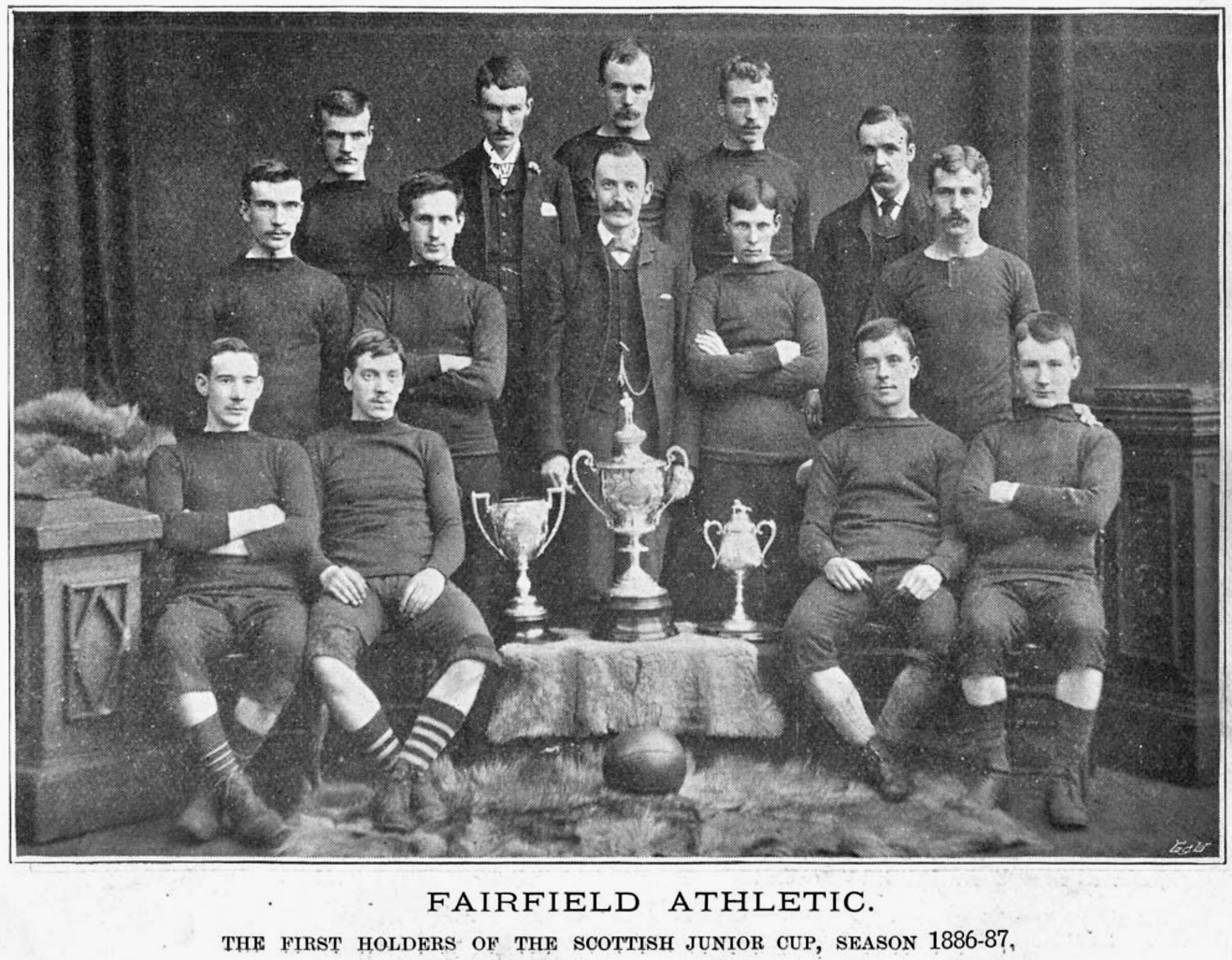
Fairfield F.C., first Scottish Junior Cup winners, 1886–87, from the Scottish Junior Portfolio, 1897

The club originally played at a Junior level, its first recorded matches coming in the 1884–85 season. The club was often referred to as Fairfield Athletic.

It was an entrant to the first Scottish Junior Cup in 1886–87. After a walkover, a bye, and three wins, the club reached the final, against Woodburn of Edinburgh, played at Argyle Park, at the time the ground of Fairfield's rival Junior club Summerton. It looked as if Fairfield had won the trophy, going 4–1 ahead with a quarter of an hour to go, when Woodburn walked off the pitch in protest at the fourth goal, and lodging a protest against the refereeing, which it claimed was "partial". Nevertheless, the game was re-played, but the protest merely delayed matters - Fairfield won the re-play 3–1 to become the first Junior Cup winners. The following season Fairfield won two Govan junior competitions.

The club finished the 1888–89 season by reaching the final of the Govan & Ibrox Cup, holding the senior Linthouse club to 2–2 draw, having been 2 goals to the good; the replay, at Whitefield Park, ended 5–3 to Linthouse, Daniel Barr of Fairfield having his arm broken. The closeness of the matches may have persuaded the club to turn Senior. It was duly admitted as a member of the Scottish Football Association in August 1889, and entered the Scottish Cup for the first time in the 1889–90 season. Its first match as a senior club was a 6–0 win over Hamilton Academical at the end of August, but its first Scottish Cup tie, a week later, was less auspicious, losing 7–2 to Linthouse, although Fairfield held a 2–1 lead just before half-time. The club also lost by 5 goals in its debut Glasgow Cup tie, going down 6–1 at Cowlairs, although the Fairfield club was "well pleased, having been treated in a very gentlemanly way".

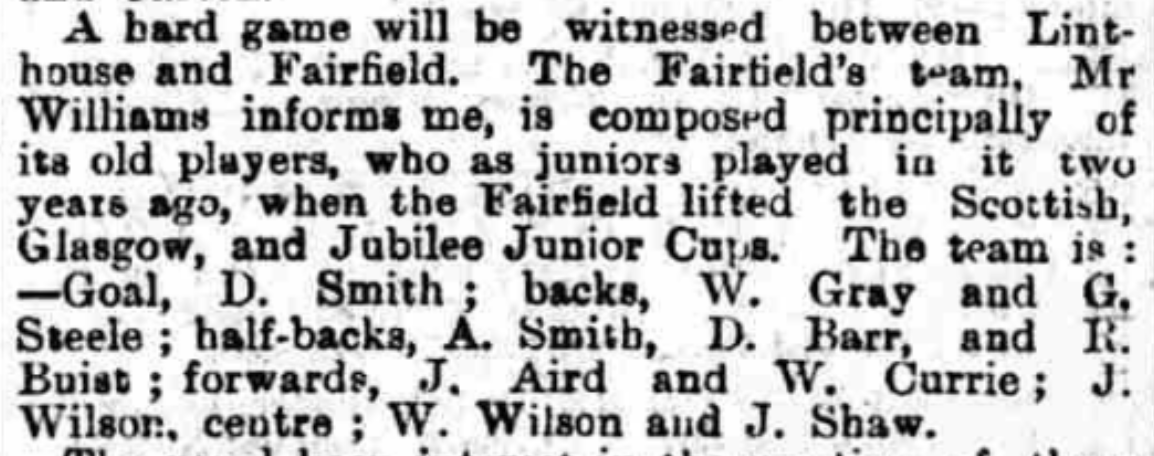
1889–90 Scottish Cup 1st Round, the Fairfield side which faced Linthouse, Glasgow Evening News, 6 September 1889

The club did win for the first time in the Scottish Cup in 1890–91, and in an emphatic manner; at Motherwell Shamrock, the club turned around 5–2 up at half-time, and finished 7–3 winners. Royal Albert proved too strong in the second round, winning 5–2. The club's Glasgow Cup run ended at the first time of asking, thanks to a 4–2 defeat at Partick Thistle.

Fairfield did not play a competitive senior fixture again. It entered the qualifying rounds of the Scottish Cup from 1891–92 to 1893–94 but each time withdrew before playing a tie; it never entered the Glasgow Cup or Govan competitions again. The club was formally terminated by its expulsion from the Scottish FA in August 1894.

== Colours ==
The club wore dark blue jerseys and knickers.

== Ground ==
The club originally played at Lorne Park, taking over from Mavisbank. From 1888, it took over Summerton's ground at Argyle Park, which had previously been the home of Ingram.

== Honours ==
- Scottish Junior Cup:
  - Winner: 1886–87
- Govan Jubilee Cup:
  - Runner-up: 1889–90
- Govan & Ibrox Cup:
  - Runner-up: 1888–89
- Govan & Plantation Junior Cup:
  - Winner: 1887–88
  - Runner-up: 1885–86
- Govan Jubilee Junior Cup:
  - Winner: 1887–88
