= Oban F.C. =

Former association football club in Scotland

Oban Football Club
- Full name: Oban
- Nicknames: The highlanders, the blues
- Founded: 1882
- Dissolved: 1894
- Ground: Dalintart Park
- Captain: Peter Fisher
| 1882–87 colours | 1891–94 colours |

The Oban Football Club was a football team based in Oban, Scotland.

== History ==
Oban F.C. was founded in 1882 and was admitted as a member of the Scottish Football Association before the 1885–86 season. The club's geographical isolation meant that it played few football fixtures, often relying on clubs passing through on the railway to the Highlands during the early summer months; the Scottish FA's restrictions on playing football in the off-season, adopted in 1891, was therefore costly for the club.

The town's remoteness also caused problems for the club in its entries to the Scottish Cup. With the competition arranged on a geographical basis, the club had to be placed in the Perthshire, Tayside, and Aberdeenshire region for its first entry in 1885–86, and was drawn to visit Vale of Teith in Doune, a difficult journey across Scotland. Unsurprisingly the club lost 9–1, its goal coming with a quarter of an hour remaining, with two Vale men receiving treatment for injuries.

The tables were turned the following season, when the club was drawn at home to Blairgowrie Our Boys in the first round, as Our Boys found it impossible to travel the distance to Oban and back in one day, and therefore scratched from the competition. In the second round the club lost at Dunblane.

From 1887–88 the club had nearer neighbours (relatively speaking) entering the Cup, and its first ties would be against one of those clubs; in 1887–88 and 1888–89 (after Campbeltown Athletic scratched) against Lochgilphead, and in 1889–90 and 1890–91 against Oban Rangers. The pattern of each entry was the same; Oban beat its local rivals, and then lost to a club from outside the immediate region. By virtue of a bye in 1888–89, the club reached the furthest it managed in the competition, the fourth round (final 26), but lost 6–0 at home to Clyde, all of the goals coming in the first half and Oban futilely disputing two of the goals.

The difficulties in travel were shown by the Arbroath side having to take 13 hours to travel the 130 mile distance between the towns in the 1887–88 competition, and arriving in Oban at 6am. Oban took the lead against the travel-weary Red Lichties, but the more experienced side turned things around to win 5–1, and enjoyed being "handsomely entertained" after the match. Arbroath nevertheless protested against the inaccuracy of the geographic drawing, suggesting that it would be easier for clubs from Stirlingshire to visit Oban than those from the much larger northern area.

Despite the club's efforts to promote the game in a region that was dominated by shinty, few other clubs were formed in the area. The Argyllshire Cup was created for them for the 1889–90 season, but the only competitors were the club's Scottish Cup opponents, plus Dunselma, and the 1st Argyll Rifle Volunteers of Dunoon. Oban and the Volunteers met in the first final, which was played at the original Ibrox Park; the Volunteers won 3–1. The competition was only played once more, in 1890–91, again won by the Volunteers, Oban losing to Inveraray.

The club's last entry was in 1892–93, by which time the Scottish FA had introduced qualifying rounds, and the club scratched to Inveraray in the second qualifier, having beaten Oban Rangers in the first.

== Colours ==
The club originally played in red shirts with dark blue knickerbockers. In 1887 the club changed the shirt to blue, and in 1891 the knickerbockers to white.

== Ground ==
The club's home ground was originally Dalintart Park. In 1891, Oban moved to Glencruitten Park.
