= West End F.C. (Dundee) =

Former association football club in Scotland

West End
- Full name: West End Football Club
- Nickname(s): the Enders
- Founded: 1880
- Dissolved: 1886
- Ground: Blackness Road
- President: David Wynd, Andrew Pennie
- Secretary: Alexander Chalmers, George C. Owen
- Captain: R. C. Stiven
Home colours

West End Football Club was an association football club from Dundee, Scotland.

== History ==
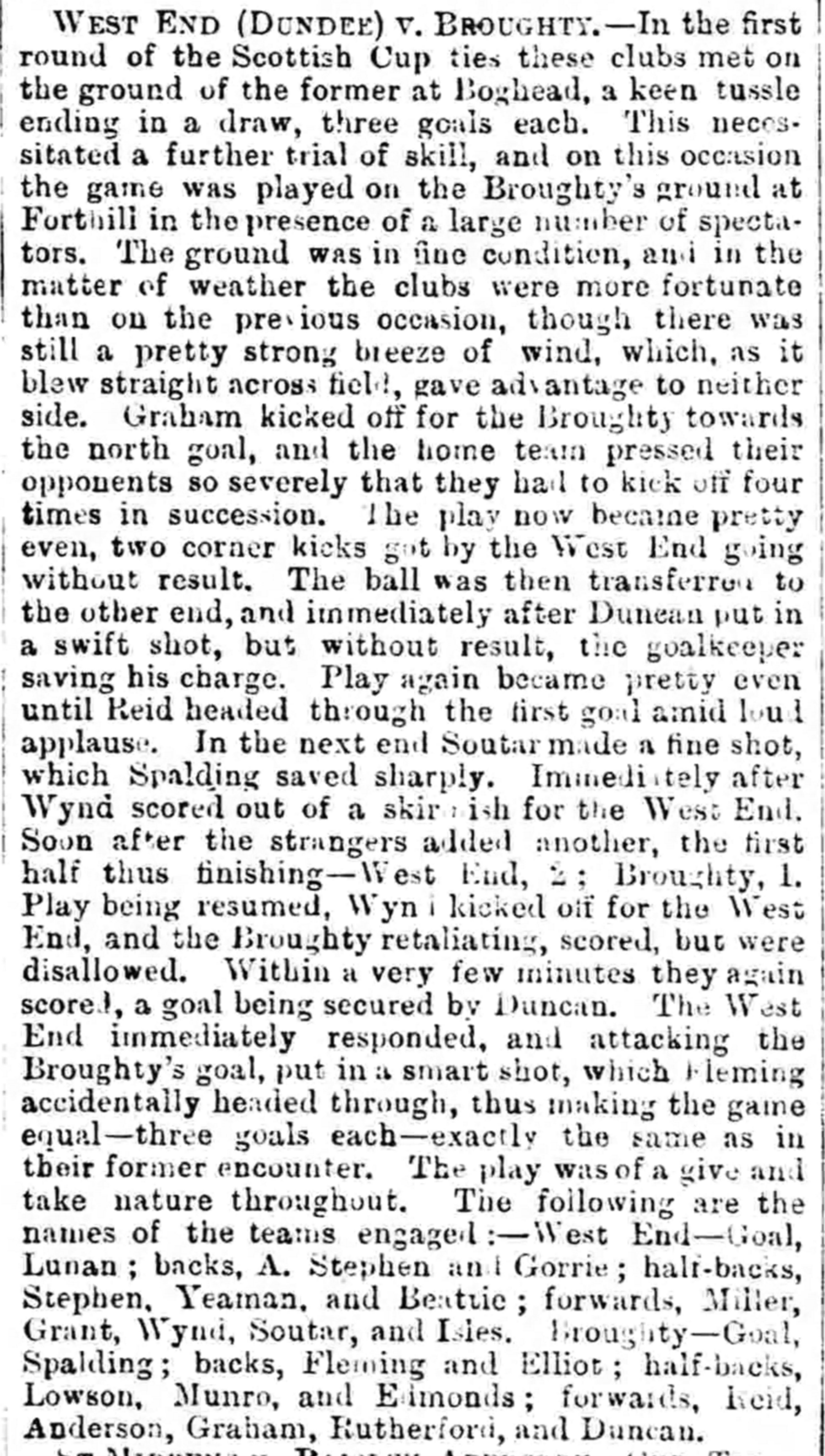
1885–86 Scottish Cup First Round, West End 3–3 Broughty, Dundee Courier, 21 September 1885

The club was formed in 1880, and its first reported match was against the 2nd XI of a club simply termed "Dundee" in February 1881.

Once the club had acquired private grounds, it was able to enter the Scottish Cup, and did so for the first time in 1882–83. West End beat Strathmore of Dundee 1–0 at Rollo's Pier, thanks to the only goal of the game from White, converting a cross 7 minutes before half-time. In the second round, West End lost 5–1 to Vale of Teith, although an "excellent tea" at the Woodside Hotel in Doune afterwards left the West End players "highly delighted".

The club entered the Cup three more times, but never won another tie. It gained a walkover into the second round in 1884–85 when the ill-named Perseverance did not turn up for the first round tie, but was thrashed 8–1 at Dundee Our Boys. In its last entry, in 1885–86, West End was drawn at home to Broughty, and, benefitting from a strong wind behind its players' backs in the first half, took a two-goal lead in the first five minutes, and went 3–0 up before Broughty pulled one back before half-time; now playing with the wind, Broughty brought the match back to 3–3 but could not force a winner. The replay at Forthill also ended 3–3, the final goal of the game being an own goal in West End's favour, and both sides progressed to the second round. West End was drawn at home to the other Strathmore of Arbroath and lost 5–4, eight of the goals coming in a "fast and furious" second half.

West End had a little more success in the Forfarshire Cup, entering from 1883–84 to 1885–86, and winning in the first round in each of its entries; its first tie, against Windmill F.C., was the club's biggest competitive win, scoring 11 without reply. The club was drawn at home to holders Arbroath in the second round, and narrowly lost 3–2, surprising the spectators by taking an early lead. It reached the semi-final in 1884–85 - albeit only winning one tie to get so far - but scratched to Strathmore (Arbroath) in the semi-final.

West End's final tie in the competition was against the Arbroath Strathmore again, in the second round in 1885–86. West End won the tie 4–1, but it was replayed after a protest, and this time the Strathie won 4–3; a West End protest that it had two goals wrongly disallowed was dismissed.

By 1885 the club was outgunned by the other Dundee sides, not having significantly recruited since its foundation. It had 57 members, compared to East End's 90, Strathmore's 150, Dundee Harp's 170, and Our Boys' 240. Although at the time the club "ha[d] never been seen to better advantage in the past seasons", the club did not survive the 1885–86 season, the final reported match known being a 4–2 defeat at Strathmore (Arbroath) in February. The club was struck off the Scottish Football Association roll before the start of the 1886–87 season. The West End name was taken in April 1887 by the Dundee Bluebell club.

== Colours ==
The club played in navy jersey and hose, with white knickers.

== Grounds ==
In common with other Dundee clubs, West End had a number of grounds:

- 1880–82: Magdalen Green public park
- 1882–83: private ground on Perth Road
- 1883–84: Balgay Farm
- 1884–86: private grounds named Boghead, on Blackness Road.

The club borrowed Rollo's Pier to host Hibernian in a friendly in October 1885; an estimated 3–4,000 spectators saw the visitors win 10–0.
