= Lindertis F.C. =

Association football club in Angus, Scotland

Lindertis
- Full name: Lindertis Football Club
- Nicknames: Kirrie, the Kirriemarians
- Founded: 1883
- Dissolved: 1891
- Ground: The Hill, Knowhead
- Hon. Secretary: William Smith
- Match Secretary: James Milne
Home colours

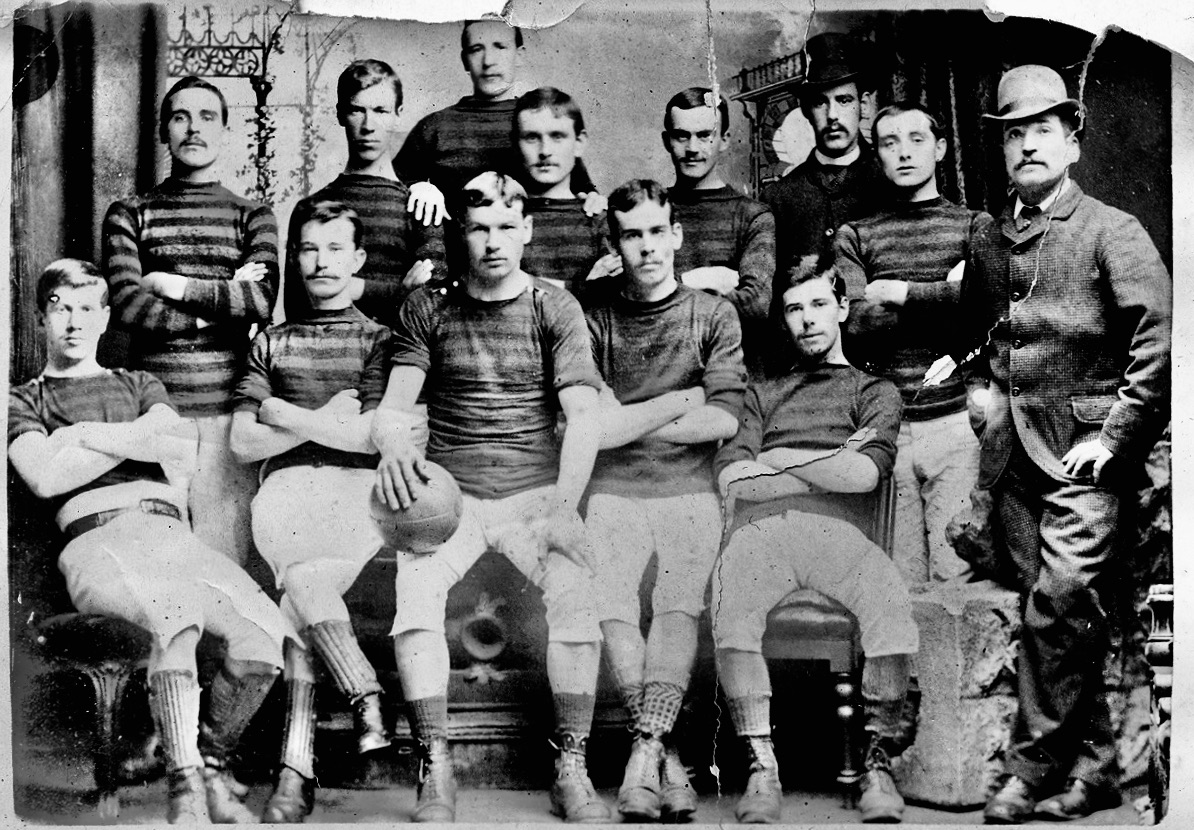
The Lindertis Football Club, 1887. Picture from Angus Council collections, cared for by ANGUSalive Museums, Galleries and Archives. Reference number Reference MS747_16_9.

Lindertis Football Club was an association football club from Kirriemuir in Scotland.

== History ==
The club was founded in 1883, taking its name from the Lindertis estate near the town, and its first reported match was a 5–0 win over a team of shoemakers in October that year.

The club entered the Scottish Cup five times. It lost in its first tie in four of those seasons; its 14–1 defeat to Forfar Athletic in 1888–89, 11 of the Forfar goals coming in the first half, remains the Loons' biggest-ever win.

The club only ever won one Scottish Cup tie, in 1887–88. In the first round, the club met Dundee Harp, who had beaten Lindertis the previous season 4–3, a match in which Lindertis had been 3–0 down at half-time, fought back to equalize, and conceded a winner at the end. History looked to have repeated itself as Harp returned to Dundee with a 2–1 win. However Harp was disqualified from the competition for fielding unregistered players, and Lindertis put into the second round against Harp's Dundonian rivals East End. Lindertis won an "exceedingly rough" tie 3–2, and survived a protest from the East End, on the basis that the match referee was not the neutral from Arbroath originally planned, who had taken the wrong train and ended up in Coupar Angus, but a drunken Lindertis fan, who "took off his hat and cheered lustily when the Lindertis scored". The referee, a Mr A. Gray from Kirriemuir, said he had not been drunk, and denied he had been wearing a hat. Instead Lindertis was fined ten shillings for not having corner flags in place.

The club received a bye from the third round, which was a mixed blessing, as Lindertis was drawn to play Renton, the runners-up the previous season, at home. The club was rewarded with a large crowd, including many from Forfar, but Renton was 8–0 up at the half-time break and eventually won 13–1. Lindertis promptly lost a number of its best players to the better-resourced Forfar Athletic.

The club did not have any more success on a local level. It only ever played 3 times in the Forfarshire Cup, conceding 8 goals in every tie. It did however win two ties in the Forfarshire Charity Cup, each win entitling it to play in the semi-final. The first time (in 1888–89) the club lost 9–1 at Arbroath, the home side's domination shown by particular praise being given to the Kirrie goalkeeper Forrest; the second, in 1889–90, saw the club drawn to play at Montrose, but Lindertis turned up with six reserves, and Montrose won 11–1.

Lindertis had entered the Scottish Cup and Forfarshire Cup tie at the start of the 1889–90 season, but lost most of its players to a new club in the town, the Kirriemuir Harriers, and, after its Scottish Cup defeat, was "practically defunct"; the club's committee members tried to reorganize the club, but was forced to scratch from its Forfarshire Cup tie with East End at the last minute, leaving East End out of pocket for 16s 6d of expenses. The club was struck from the Scottish Football Association register before the 1890–91 season for non-payment of subscriptions, and the new Kirriemuir club became the town's representative in the competition from that season. There was one final match recorded for the club, in February 1891, a 7–4 defeat at Forfar Athletic, a match in which the Loons debuted their new blue and black shirts, and Lindertis' entry to the Charity Cup for later in the month was ceded to Kirriemuir on the basis that the club was formally defunct.

== Colours ==
The club played in navy and maroon hooped shirts and white shorts.

== Grounds ==
The club's ground was variously known as The Hill or Knowehead, and was owned by a Mr Clarke.
