= Carfin Hibernians F.C. =

Former association football club in Scotland

Carfin Hibernians
- Full name: Carfin Hibernians F.C.
- Nickname: the Hibs
- Founded: 1891
- Dissolved: 1894
- Ground: Byresknows Park
- Match Secretary: P. Brolley
Home colours

Carfin Hibernians Football Club was a Scottish football team based in Carfin, North Lanarkshire. Founded in the late 19th century, the club primarily competed in regional leagues and cup competitions, gaining recognition for its strong association with the local Irish Catholic community. The team was one of several clubs formed by Irish immigrants in Scotland. It participated in the Scottish Cup multiple times, achieving some notable results against more established teams.

== History ==
The club, from Carfin in Lanarkshire, was formed in 1891 as a split from the Carfin Shamrock club, which was in turn being riven by factions, consequently losing its membership of the Scottish Football Association. The offshoot's competitive match took place at Linthouse in the first qualifying round of the 1891–92 Scottish Cup and ended in a 12–0 defeat.

The club also entered the Lanarkshire Cup that season (as it turned out, for the only time), and beat Hamilton Harp in the first round; Harp protested that Hibernians turned up so late that the match finished in the dark, even though the game was at Hibernians' own ground, but this protester was dismissed. The club also turned up late (and one man short) for the second round tie with Airdrieonians, formally scratched from the competition, and played out a friendly match, in which the Onians scored 11 without reply. The defeat put the Hibernians into the Consolation Cup (the Coatbridge Express Cup), and the club was drawn to visit Wishaw Thistle; Hibernians again scratched on the day of the match, and the clubs played a friendly match, which ended at half-time with 3–0 in favor of Thistle because of bad weather conditions.

The Hibernians and Shamrock nearly merged back together in 1892, but retained separate operations for the next two seasons. Hibernians achieved better results in the qualifying rounds for the 1892–93 Scottish Cup, beating Whifflet Shamrock in the first round, but losing in the second 10–0 at Albion Rovers, who played almost the entire game with 10 men, but "cribbed, cabined, and confined the Hibernians throughout" and "had some fun with them".

The Hibernians' final match of note was in the first qualifying round of the 1893–94 Scottish Cup, in which the club had been drawn at home to Cowlairs, but the club sold home advantage for £6 - the club was in financial struggle, so that some players even had to wear their normal clothing. Despite Cowlairs only playing with 10 men, and with several Shamrock men guesting - mistakenly under the impression the game was a friendly - the Hibernians lost 11–1. As a result of this debacle, the two Carfin clubs agreed to merge under the simple name Carfin.

== Colours ==
The club wore green and white hoops, with black knickers.

== Ground ==
The club played at Byresknowes Park, which had been Shamrock's ground, and forcing the older club to move. A Mr Johnston, who claimed to represent the Shamrock, said that he had arranged an adjoining pitch for Shamrock for the season, but the local association declared that he had no right to represent the Shamrock club, and his purported club faded away.
