= Brechin F.C. =

Association football club in Angus, Scotland

Brechin
- Full name: Brechin Football Club
- Nicknames: the City Lads, City Men
- Founded: 1886
- Dissolved: 1896
- Ground: Montrose Street Park
- Secretary: George Findlay, John Sandeman
- Patron: Mr R. A. Sinclair
1886–90 colours	1890–95 colours

Brechin Football Club was an association football club from Brechin in Scotland.

== History ==
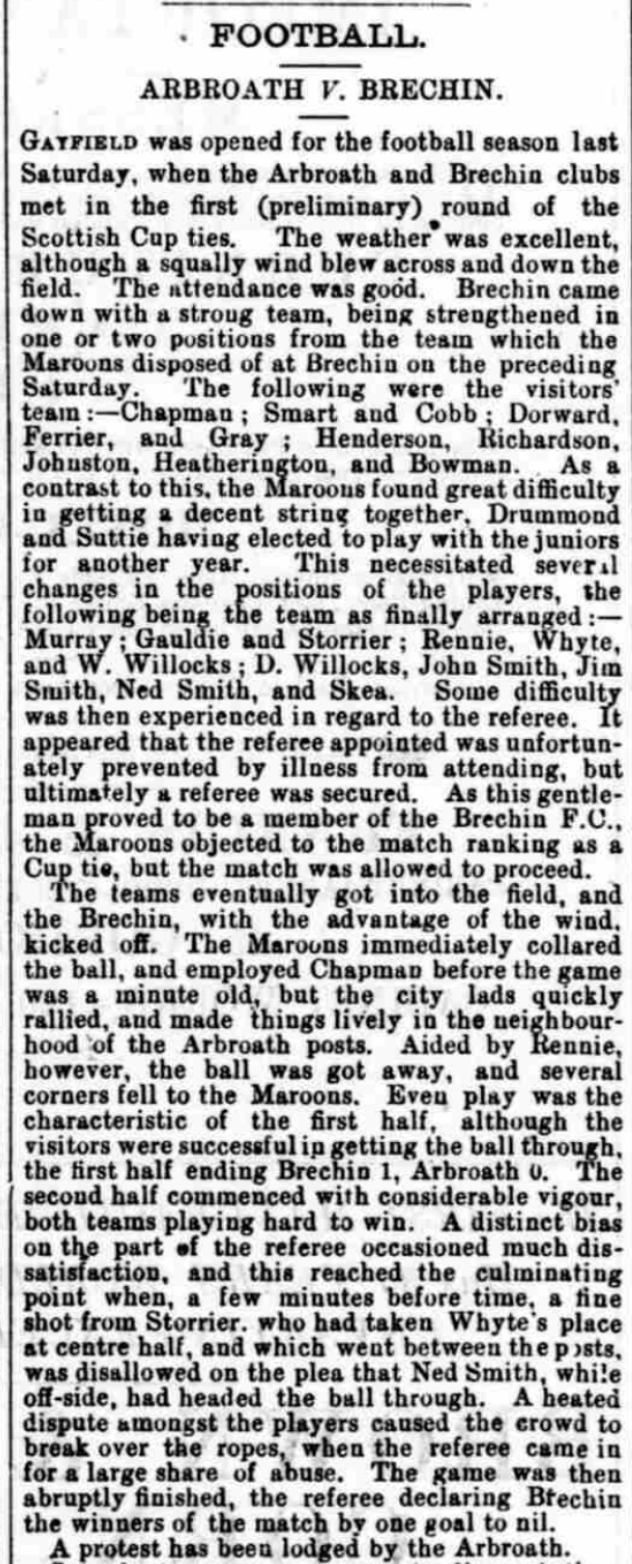
Brechin's abandoned Cup tie with Arbroath, 1891-92

The first attempt at founding an association football club in Brechin was in 1879; the club lasted until 1883.

Senior football began in 1888 when the club joined the Scottish Football Association under the name Brechin. The club had been founded as Brechin United in September 1886, following a meeting at the Alma Hotel between members of the Rangers and Thistle clubs, with a Mr Sinclair agreeing to help fund the new club. The United name was last used in November 1887; one player (forward J. Dakers) was a hold-over from the original Brechin club's first match.

=== Local competitions ===
The club was notable for its consistent lack of success. It appeared in the leading county competition - the Forfarshire Cup - from 1887–88 to 1895–96 and lost every single tie it played, amassing a goal difference of 7 for, 41 against in its six ties. Its record in the invitational Forfar & District Charity Cup, which excluded clubs from Dundee, was marginally better; it entered from 1887–88 to 1894–95, and won two ties in the competition, both in 1892–93 - 9–1 against Arbroath Wanderers, who started the game with 9 men and only added one more during the 90 minutes, and 5–0 against Kirriemuir, flattered by 3 goals in the last 20 minutes. The City Lads lost 5–3 at home to Forfar Athletic in the semi-final; Brechin was briefly 2–1 up but two goals in two minutes during the second half changed the game for the visitors.

=== Scottish Cup main rounds ===
Its Scottish Cup record was similarly meagre, losing every tie it played. The club made its debut in 1888–89; drawn at the more experienced Montrose, and handicapped by a goalkeeper making his debut, Brechin went down 8–1. The following season the club lost 4–1 at Lochee), and in 1890–91 4–3 to Kirriemuir, the match being dominated by Brechin but Kirrie scoring four times from four breaks.

=== 1891–92 tie with Arbroath ===
From the 1891–92 season the Scottish FA introduced qualifying rounds, and the club lost each of its first ties until its final entry in 1895–96. The club however was unlucky in 1891–92. Drawn to play at Arbroath in the first qualifying round, the clubs played an already-arranged friendly in August, with the Red Lichties winning 7–3. The media therefore thought that, as regards the Cup tie, "the result cannot be doubtful", but Arbroath was forced to make changes, and Brechin came away with a surprise 1–0 win. However Arbroath had protested before the match that the official referee had not turned up due to illness, and the replacement (Mr Dalgetty) being a Brechin club member meant the match could not count as a Cup tie; the referee's decisions "occasioned much dissatisfaction" and, after he controversially disallowed a late equalizer for offside, the crowd broke onto the pitch, causing the abandonment of the match and the referee to declare the result as it stood.

Although Mr Dalgetty claimed to have left the Brechin club some time before, and Arbroath admitted that one of the Arbroath players (Henry Rennie) had seized him by the throat, the Scottish FA upheld the protest on the basis that the match had not been completed, and ordered a replay at Brechin. The Red Lichties required a police escort for the replay, but, undaunted, won 9–3, and Brechin suffered a record defeat (15–0) to the same side the following season, Brechin ruing a decision to sell home advantage.

=== End of the club ===
The club did not play after the end of 1895; it was effectively bankrupt. In January 1896, the club's landlord, David Milne of Drumlachie, brought a claim against the club for £8 of unpaid rent, and obtained a decree to secure the club's assets - "paling, seats, forms, etc." - which were on the ground; the court granted the decree. The club was formally dissolved in February.

== Colours ==
The club originally played in blue, red, and white vertically striped shirts. The club changed in 1890 to white shirts and blue knickers, and in 1895 to dark blue.

== Grounds ==
The club originally played at the Brechin Recreation Ground. From March 1888 the club used Montrose Street Park, also the ground of the Brechin East End junior side.
