= Broughty F.C. =

Former association football club in Scotland

Broughty
- Full name: Broughty Football Club
- Nickname(s): the Ferry, the Suburban Youths
- Founded: 1882
- Dissolved: 1892
- Ground: Forthill Park
- Hon. President: Ex-Bailie Norrie
- Secretary: William Anderson, J. M. Forbes
Home colours

Broughty Football Club was an association football club from Broughty Ferry, Dundee, Scotland.

== History ==
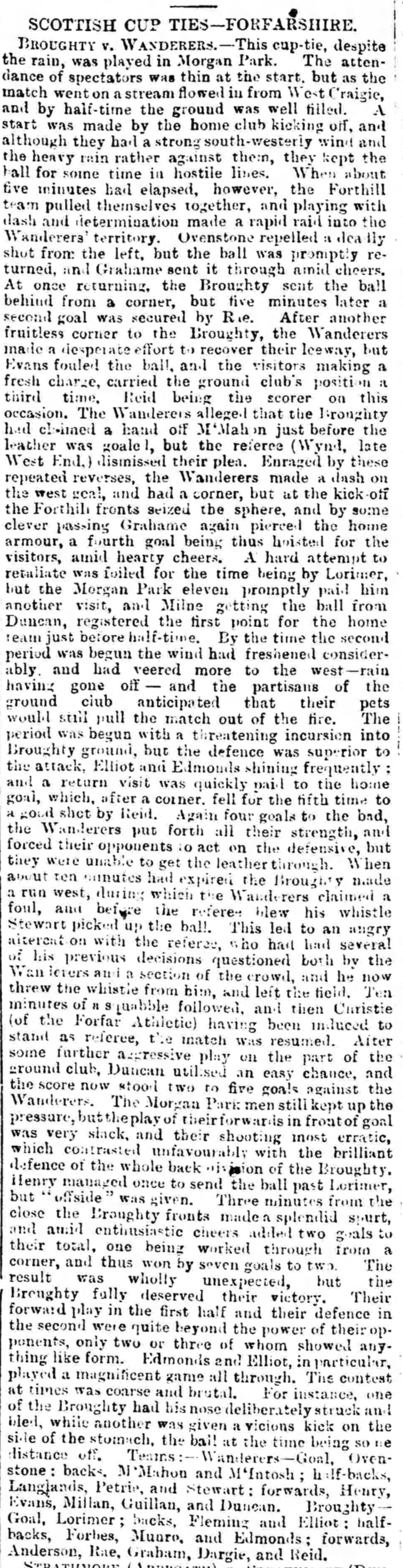
Broughty's finest game; its one Scottish Cup win, from the Dundee Courier, 13 September 1886

Broughty was founded in 1882 and its earliest recorded match was that December, a 1–1 draw at home to East End Wanderers. The media sometimes referred to the club as Broughty Ferry but its registered name was simply Broughty.

It was immediately active in local football, being one of the 17 clubs which founded the Forfarshire Football Association in February 1883, and the club's Mr Scott becoming the organization's first secretary.

The club was therefore one of the first competitors in the first Forfarshire Cup in 1883–84, but its debut was as disastrous as could be, losing 22–0 to Dundee Harp, a world record at the time.

Chastened by this, Broughty did not enter the following season, but in August 1885 the club joined the Scottish Football Association, and entered the Scottish Cup for the first time, as well as trying the Forfarshire again. In the 1885–86 Scottish Cup, Broughty was drawn away to West End of Dundee. Playing into the wind, Broughty went 2–0 down after five minutes; turning around at half-time three goals down, Broughty brought it back to 3–3 but could not force a winner. The replay at Forthill also ended 3–3, the final goal of the game being an own goal in West End's favour, and under the competition rules both sides progressed to the second round.

In the second round, the club went to the nearer side of Dundee to play East End, and lost in a thrice-played tie; the original game ended 2–2, the East End not having its strongest team out and having two players injured for most of the match, and Broughty protesting an 8–3 defeat in the replay as East End fielded an unregistered player (Douglas Galbraith).

Broughty did win its first round tie in the Forfarshire that season, 6–0 against Monifieth, but lost to the Harp in the second round. A measure of the difference in sides is that the Harp only scoring four goals "created much surprise amongst the spectators, and no little gratification to the friends of the Broughty."

In the 1886–87 Scottish Cup first round, Broughty beat Dundee Wanderers 7–2 away from home, in a match notable for the referee walking off with ten minutes to go in protest at the crowd; East End beat the club again in the second, 5–4, two late Broughty goals making the tie tighter than it seemed.

Those two ties would be the only competitive matches Broughty ever won. Broughty continued entering both competitions until 1891–92, drawing 3–3 at home to Montrose in the first preliminary round of the Scottish, a match marred by a fight between Broughty left-winger Paterson and Montrose half-back Burgess; Paterson was laid out and Burgess sent off. Montrose won the replay 5–1, the Ferry goal being a "very doubtful" late consolation. In the first round of the Forfarshire, at East End, Broughty won the toss and made East End kick into a strong wind and rain; however, despite this, Broughty was 3–0 down at half-time, and with the conditions due to be against them, Broughty did not turn out for the second half.

A sign of the desperation of the club was that it had turned up for a friendly at Brechin with only two players plus the trainer, the rest of the team "having tarried by the way at Friockheim, for what purpose and why it was not stated". Unsurprisingly there is no more heard from the club after the season.

== Colours ==
The club played in pink jerseys, unique in Scotland for the time, although more popular in England.

== Grounds ==
Broughty's ground was Forthill Park, half a mile from the station. It had previously been the ground of the Abertay rugby union club and was also one of the Forfarshire cricket grounds.
