= Inveraray F.C. =

Former association football club in Scotland

Inveraray
- Full name: Inveraray Football Club
- Founded: 1889
- Dissolved: 1895
- Ground: Winterton
- Secretary: Ernest Smith
Home colours

Inveraray Football Club was a Scottish association football club based in the town of Inveraray, Argyll.

== History ==
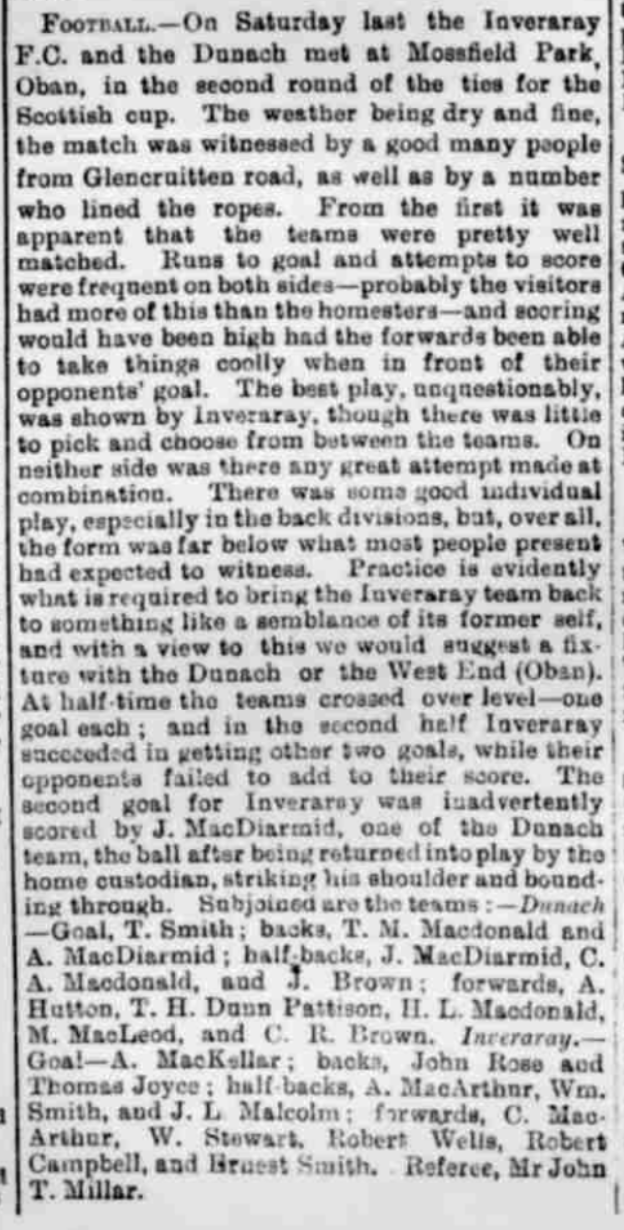
1893–94 Scottish Cup 2nd preliminary round, Dunach 1–3 Inveraray, Oban Times, 30 September 1893

The club was founded in 1889, as an offshoot of a shinty club, and played its first match in the 1889–90 Argyllshire Cup against Oban Rangers. Inveraray's innate skills and stamina helped the club to two replays against the more experienced side before bowing out.

The club turned senior in 1890 and entered the 1890–91 Scottish Cup. It beat Lochgilphead in the first round and survived a second round protest by Oban F.C. on the basis that four of the Inveraray players had won prizes at the Highland Games, the Scottish FA ruling that it had no power over money paid outside football. Inveraray was drawn at Morton in the third round, and, rather than scratching because of the distance, the players drove to Kilmun, caught a boat from there to Greenock, and travelled back the same day. In the circumstances, a 10–0 defeat was not unexpected.

The Scottish FA introduced preliminary rounds from the following season, and in the first preliminary in 1891–92, Inveraray beat Oban Rangers, who protested that the Winterton pitch was the wrong size, and included formal plans with its protest. Inveraray - not wanting to incur the expense of travelling to Glasgow - sent depositions from the groundsman and two referees who knew the ground, and the protest was dismissed. The club entered the competition until 1894–95, never reaching the first round proper, and was struck from the SFA register in August 1895.

== Colours ==
The club originally wore white jerseys with blue knickers. In 1892 it changed the jerseys to yellow and black.

== Ground ==
The club played at Winterton.
