= Oban Rangers F.C. =

Former association football club in Scotland

Oban Rangers Football Club
- Full name: Oban Rangers
- Nicknames: the Rangers, the Clavites, the Stripes,
- Founded: 1886
- Dissolved: 1893
- Ground: Mossfield Park
- President: Peter Thomson
- Secretary: R. W. Campbell, Roderick M. M'Calman
Home colours

Oban Rangers Football Club was a football team based in Oban, Scotland.

== History ==
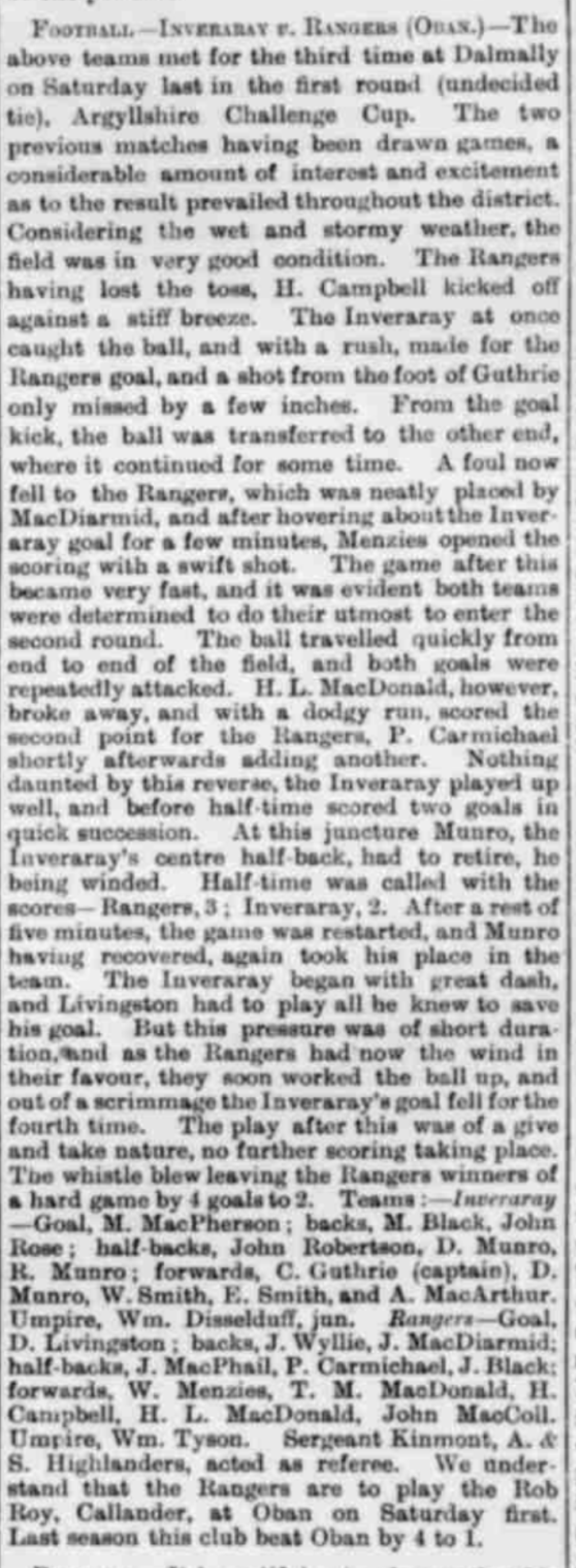
1889–90 Argyllshire Cup 2nd Replay, Oban Rangers 4–2 Inveraray, Oban Times, 25 January 1890

The club was founded in 1886 as Balaclava Rangers; its earliest recorded matches were against the Oban F.C. second XI, and its tactical nous was somewhat lacking, the players "follow[ing] the ball like children chasing butterflies".

Nevertheless, the club improved, although remained "under-estimated", and by the end of the 1887–88 season was able to face the Oban first XI on an equal footing. The club duly resolved to apply for membership of the Scottish Football Association at the end of the season, and was successful in its application. This meant that the club could enter the 1888–89 Scottish Cup. The regional nature of the Cup in that era meant the club was drawn away to Lochgilphead, one of the few other clubs in the north of Argyllshire, and which had spent several weeks practising before the tie; further handicapped by a "very wet hour's drive" in a brake from Crina'n, the Rangers were 7–1 behind at half-time, and ultimately were humiliated 15–1.

On 31 May 1889, the club resolved to change its name to The Rangers, although the club was almost always referred to as Oban Rangers, and occasionally Rangers (Oban). It entered both the Scottish Cup under its new name, and was drawn at Oban in the first round; with a 2–0 half-time lead it looked as if Rangers would finally beat the senior side for the first time. However the second half was "wholly in favour of Oban", who scored 5 times without reply, Oban goalkeeper Arthur Hutton only making one further save.

Four days after the tie, clubs in the county met to form a new Argyllshire Football Association, and set up a cup competition. The first round of the county tournament saw the club's only victory in a competitive match; the club originally drew 1–1 with Inveraray, a shinty side playing its first football match, and Rangers finished a man short after Macmillan left the field exhausted; Inveraray had two goals chalked off for offside. The replay at Oban ended 3–3 and a second replay, at Dalmally, finally fell to the Rangers. The club met Oban in the semi-final, drawing 3–3 having largely dominated the game and having a goal disallowed; the Rangers lost the brothers MacDonald for the replay and lost 4–1.

In the first round of the 1890–91 Scottish Cup, Rangers was once again drawn to play Oban, the tie being held on the new Oban ground of Glencruitten. Rangers went into the tie as favourite, on the basis that the Rangers had improved over the year while Oban had deteriorated, but the older side won 3–0; four days after the tie, the clubs met again, for a trophy donated by Col. Malcolm M.P. as part of the Argyllshire Gathering. Rangers' ill-luck struck again, as Oban scored a last-minute equalizer after injury had reduced Rangers to 10 men for the second half. In the Argyllshire Cup, the sides met yet again, and yet again Oban won through, with a last-minute winner; Rangers' protest that the goal was scored after the expiry of time was rejected by one vote.

The Rangers' luck finally turned in December 1890, when the long-delayed replay for the Argyllshire Gathering Cup took place at Glencruitten. Oban was forced on the defensive all match, and Rangers won 2–1, to register the club's first win over Oban.

However, the club's opportunities fell away soon afterwards. There were no further county competitions, and in 1891–92 the Scottish Cup introduced preliminary rounds. The Rangers entered the national competition until 1893–94 but lost its first tie every time; it protested its defeat to Inveraray in 1891–92 on the basis that the pitch was the wrong size, and included formal plans with its protest, but Inveraray - not wanting to incur the expense of travelling to Glasgow - sent depositions from the groundsman and two referees who knew the ground, and the protest was dismissed. One consolation was that, at the start of the 1891–92 season, the Rangers beat Oban 6–2 in a friendly.

The club's remoteness was a problem; even the older Oban found problems in arranging fixtures, and in 1892–93 Rangers only played 4 matches, winning 1 and losing 3. Even the derby match against Oban in November 1892 had to be called off because of difficulty in raising sides. The club had still been "on a very sound financial footing" in 1890, but after losing to Dunach in the first preliminary round of the Scottish Cup in September 1893, the club seems to have dissolved.

== Colours ==
The club originally wore royal blue and white 1" hooped jerseys and white knickers. In 1889 the knickers were changed to blue (serge), and in 1893 the shirts also changed to blue.

== Ground ==
The club played at Mossfield Park, rented from the council at a cost of £1.

In 1888, the club erected a corrugated iron pavilion on its practice ground at Market Stance, paid for by a public subscription.
