= Lochee United F.C. (1890) =

Former association football club in Scotland

Lochee United
- Full name: Lochee United Club
- Nickname(s): the United, the Queen's Park of the North
- Founded: 1890
- Dissolved: 1909
- Ground: St Margaret's Park
- Capacity: 2,000
- Hon. President: the Rev. Thomas Lennie
1895–98 colours	1898–1909 colours

Lochee United Football Club was a Scottish association football club based in the town of Lochee, now part of Dundee.

== History ==
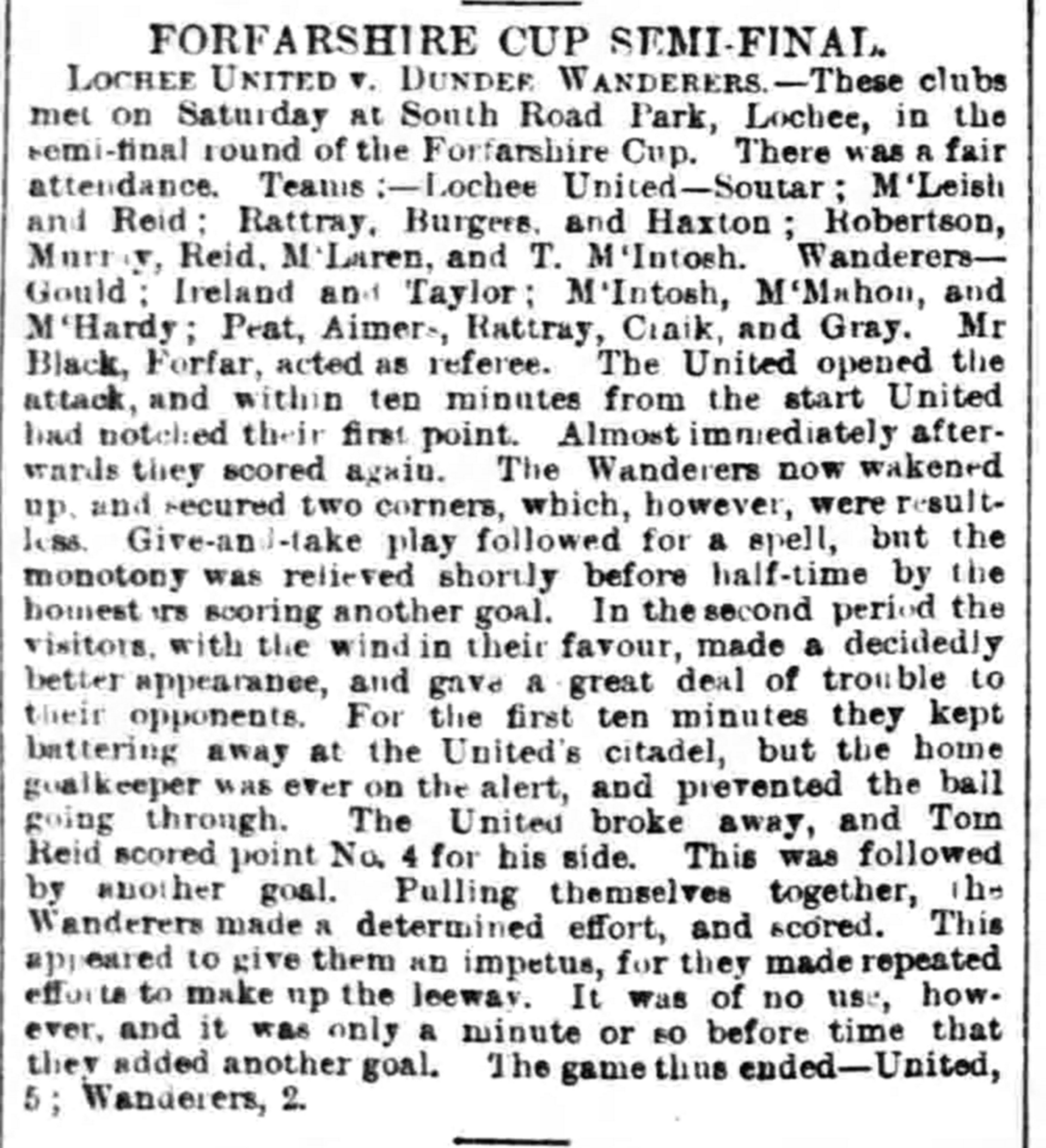
Lochee United 5–2 Dundee Wanderers, Forfarshire Cup Semi-final, 1894–95, from the Dundee Courier, 24 December 1894

On 17 September 1890, a meeting at the Weavers' Hall took place, between those "favourable to the formation of a new football club"; those present founded Lochee United as a successor side to the moribund Lochee F.C., playing at Lochee's South Road Park, and expressing hopes that "the majority of the old Lochee players will be found in the ranks of the new club"; Lochee's honorary president Rev. Lennie took up the post of Honorary President in the new club, although other executive roles were filled by a new team. The ethos of the club was strict amateurism, and it was the only senior amateur side north of the River Tay for most of its existence.

The new club made its first appearance in a friendly at Broughty on 27 September 1890 in a 12–1 defeat. Initially the club was as unsuccessful as the original Lochee; it never won a tie in the Dundee charity cups that were played until 1896. The Scottish Football Association had also brought in a qualifying stage for the Scottish Cup, and the club lost in the first preliminary round in its first three entries.

In 1894–95 however the club had a notable upturn in form. In the Scottish Cup, it won through two qualifying rounds to reach the first round proper for the first time, albeit losing 5–2 to King's Park in a "disagreeable" game. In the Forfarshire Cup, not only did the club win a tie for the first time, it reached the final, against Dundee; after an argument in which Dundee requested to hold the final at home and refused to play at the Wanderers' East Dock Street ground, the match was played at Gayfield. Dundee changed to dark blue for the tie, and had been weakened by losing players to the international match between Scotland and Wales, but won with the only goal of the game, coming from a scrimmage near the end; play had just been interrupted by a pitch invasion after a spectator attacked referee Sangster, being the signal for a "general free for all".

Perhaps buoyed by this, Lochee joined the Northern League in 1895, of which it was a member until the 1907–08 season, albeit the club was a perennial struggler, never finishing in the top half of the table, finishing bottom four times, and even going through the 1896–87 season without a win. The club's biggest win in the competition - 6–0 over Fair City Athletic - came in its first season.

The club's next significant cup run came in 1897–98, by which time the Scottish Cup preliminary rounds had been replaced by the Scottish Qualifying Cup. By reaching the fourth round, United qualified for the Cup proper. The Qualifying Cup run ended with a 10–1 defeat at Orion of Aberdeen, "and but for the plucky work of Coventry in goal" the result would have been worse; Lochee's consolation from Reid being the last goal of the game. In the first round itself, Lochee lost 8–0 at home to Heart of Midlothian, the United hampered by losing Morris for the second half thanks to a foot injury, albeit the club was already four down.

The club continued to enter the Scottish Qualifying Cup until 1909–10, but did not win through to the first round proper again. The United reached the Forfarshire Cup final again in 1899–1900, but the various leagues in Scotland had whittled the smaller clubs down so much that the tournament only had six entries, one of those being Dundee's reserve side, and United only had one tie before the final at Dens Park, which United lost 1–0 to Arbroath in a replay, the goal having "a flavour of luck" about it.

The club lost its ground in 1908 to junior side Lochee Harp, and the club seems not to have recovered from the blow, dropping out of the Northern League and not entering the Forfarshire Cup. The club did enter the Qualifying Cup for 1909–10, but scratched before the tie with Dundee Wanderers was played.

== Colours ==
The club originally played in Lochee's black and white hoops with white knickers. In 1892 the club changed its knickers to blue, and in 1895 to black.

In 1898 the club changed the strip entirely, to blue shirts and white shorts.

== Ground ==
The club originally played at Lochee's South Park Road. In 1896, the club moved to a new ground, which it named St Margaret's Park (after the Rev. Lennie's church), on Loon's Road, in a more central location in the town and 2 minutes' walk from tram stops; the first game at the new ground was a Northern League fixture with Forfar Athletic on 1 November 1896. The highest crowd recorded was 2,000 for the inaugural match, and for the Cup tie with Hearts in 1898.
