= Arbroath Wanderers F.C. =

Association football club in Angus, Scotland

Arbroath Wanderers
- Full name: Arbroath Wanderers F.C.
- Nickname(s): the Wanderers, the Damleyites
- Founded: 1891
- Dissolved: 1897
- Ground: Damley Park
- Hon. President: A. W. R. Birrell
- Secretary: G. D. Campbell
- Captain: D. Kinnear
1891–94 colours	1894–97 colours

Arbroath Wanderers F.C. was an association football club from Arbroath in Forfarshire, active in the 1890s.

== History ==
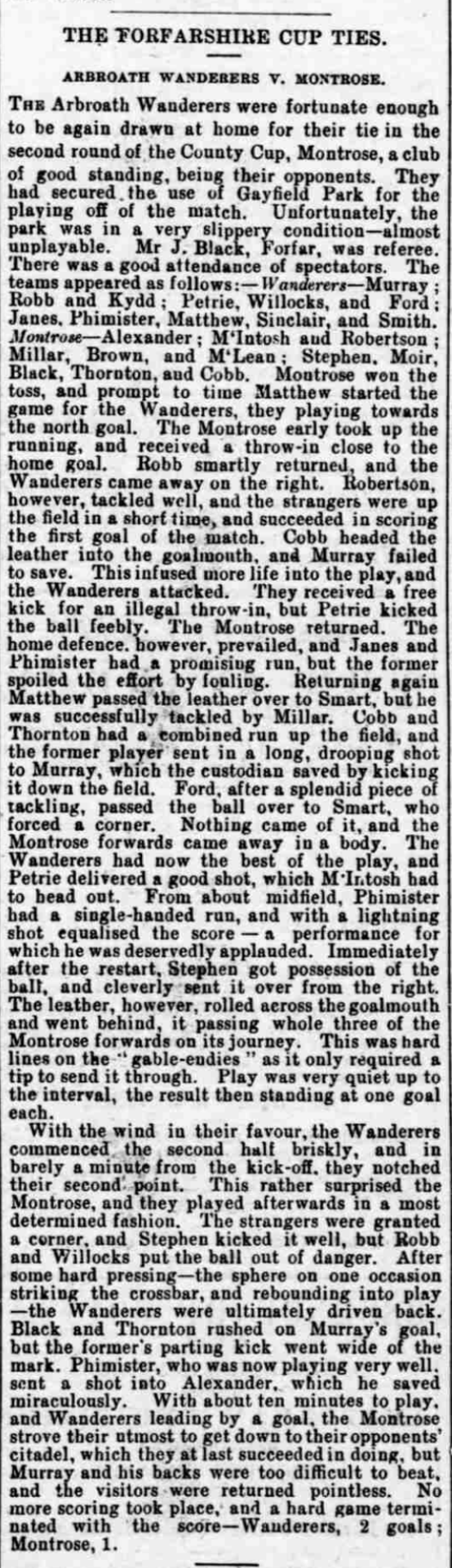
1895–96 Forfarshire Cup 2nd Round, Arbroath Wanderers 2–1 Montrose (result overturned), Arbroath Herald, 21 November 1895

The [club was formed in November 1891 by individuals who thought Arbroath could use a second senior club, and, without being able to secure a home ground for its first season, lived up to its name by playing every match away from home. Its first match - against the Montrose second XI - was a 9–2 defeat, but it won its second game, 4–0, at Friockheim. The club secured Damley Park from mid-1892, enabling the club to join the Scottish Football Association, and from the 1892–93 season it started to enter both the Scottish Cup preliminary rounds and the Forfarshire Cup.

With the much bigger and more established Arbroath F.C. on the club's doorstep, it found the going hard, losing every one of its Scottish ties, and it did not win in the Forfarshire Cup until 1894–95; the club was drawn against the new Dundee Hibernian, and sold home advantage for a guarantee of £4, but, after the Wanderers won 4–3, not only did it only receive £1 (said to be the whole of the gate money), but the Forfarshire FA ordered a replay as the match had stopped six minutes early. The Wanderers put the position right with a 7–1 win in the replay at home. The club lost 4–2 in the second round at the amateurs of Lochee United, a protest on various matters including the state of the pitch, the ball being lost for four minutes after it was kicked over a fence, and the game finishing in darkness; the Forfarshire FA dismissed it as "frivolous".

That season was at least the club's most successful on the pitch to that date, with 13 wins, 5 draws, and 12 defeats, but the club was in a financially perilous state, In 1895–96, the club earned its most prominent win, by beating Forfar Athletic 3–2 in the Forfarshire Cup, the winner being headed home by Smart after Phimister lifted the ball over a scrimmage. The Loons were top of the Northern League at the time, and would go on to win the title; the result was seen as sweet revenge, as the Wanderers had not been considered good enough for a place in the competition at the start of the season. In the second round it seemingly had beaten Montrose - its conquerors in the new Scottish Qualifying Cup - on a "wretched" Gayfield, but it was replayed after a protest about the pitch and "molesting" by spectators, and the Gable Endies won the second go, this time at Damley Park, 2–1. A Wanderers protest that the winning goal came 3 minutes after time, and Murray in goal could not stop it because he had been incapacitated by a foul, was dismissed.

Without a league to play in, and now out of all of the competitions, the Wanderers had the problem of surviving the second half of the season on friendlies while rival clubs were receiving a regular income from the Northern League. The difficulties of keeping the team together in such circumstances were made evident by a 10–0 defeat to Forfar Athletic in February 1896. The finances were also laid bare by a Montrose protest in February that the Wanderers had not paid Montrose its gate money share from the Forfarshire ties in November.

The club's 1896–97 season was disastrous. Although it had its best result in the Scottish Qualifying Cup - a 1–0 defeat to Lochee United, in front of a poor crowd - the club suffered successive defeats to Montrose (in the Forfarshire Cup) and Victoria United by 10–1 and 9–1. In 1897 the left the Forfar Association and only entered the Qualifying Cup; in the first round it sold its home advantage to Forfar Athletic - and on the day of the match sent two telegrams to Forfar, one saying the players had missed the train, the second that there were not enough players. The Wanderers were ordered to pay 24s in compensation. The club had one last attempt at revival, but its application in October for re-admission to the Forfarshire was refused, and no more is heard of the club.

== Colours ==
The club wore red, blue, and chocolate hoops originally. By 1894 the club had changed to maroon and white striped jerseys.

== Ground ==
The club's home pitch was Damley Park, the home of Strathmore the previous decade. In 1894 it moved to Lochlands Park, a cricket ground later used by Arbroath Amateurs, but secured Damley Park once more in August 1895.

== Notable players ==
- Alex Penny, left-back with a number of clubs, including Newcastle East End and Arbroath, played a season for the Wanderers
