= Kirriemuir F.C. =

Association football club in Angus, Scotland

Kirriemuir
- Full name: Kirriemuir Football Club
- Nickname(s): the Harriers, the Kirrie, the Auld Lichts
- Founded: 1889
- Dissolved: 1897
- Ground: Newton Park
- Secretary: James Valentine
Home colours

Kirriemuir F.C. was an association football club from Kirriemuir in Scotland.

== History ==
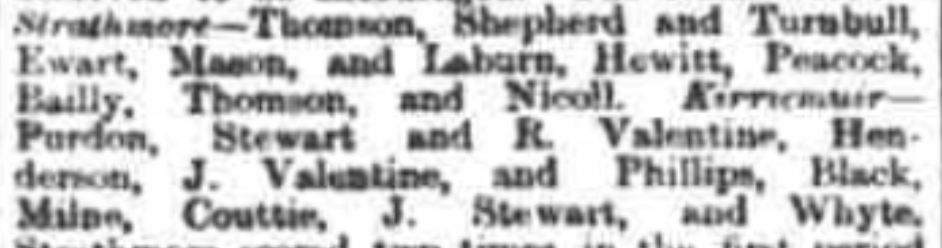
1891–92 Scottish Cup 1st round, Strathmore 3–7 Kirriemuir, line-ups, Dundee Advertiser, 7 September 1891

The club was formed in 1889 out of an athletics club, with a number of players from the other senior club in the town, the moribund Lindertis, changing allegiance.

The club joined the Scottish Football Association in August 1890, effectively in place of Lindertis, which did not renew its subscription; Kirriemuir had to overcome concern that it did not have its own private ground. The club's first competitive match, at Brechin in the first round of the 1890–91 Scottish Cup, was a 4–3 win against the odds; all of the Kirriemuir goals coming on breaks. The club lost 3–0 in the second round at home to Montrose, and had the misfortune to be drawn against the Gable Endies in the first round of the Forfarshire Cup, losing again.

Kirriemuir did not play in the proper rounds of the Cup again; from 1891 the Scottish FA introduced qualifying rounds, and later the Scottish Qualifying Cup, and Kirriemuir did not progress far enough again to make the main draw. Indeed, the club only won once more in the competition - 7–3 against Strathmore of Dundee in 1891–92, at the latter's new Logie Park ground, having been 2–0 down at half-time. The Kirrie came close to a win in the first round in 1893–94, leading perennial blockage Montrose 2–1 in the dying stages of their tie, but Montrose scored twice late to win 3–2.

It had a similar lack of success in the local competitions. The club played three times in the Forfarshire Charity Cups, which excluded clubs from Dundee, from 1890–91 to 1892–93, but only won two ties, both against Coupar Angus. It entered the county competition until 1896–97, again only winning one tie, against Friockheim in 1894–95. The consolation was that the 13–1 score was the club's biggest win; the downside was the second round saw the club's biggest defeat, 15–0 at Montrose.

The club gave up the unequal struggle in 1896. It was struck from the Scottish FA membership and, although still in the Forfarshire Association, did not send a team, or even word, to Arbroath, with regard to their first round tie in the Forfarshire Cup. This caused some embarrassment to Alexander Gow, who had been sent to the Forfarshire FA at the start of the season as the Kirriemuir representative, but whose club had not played a single match all season, and who could only suggest that - as "the introduction of professionalism had dome much towards the decadence of football" - the Scottish FA should send some surplus funds to the poorer county clubs. No such funds were forthcoming and Mr Gow's representation on the Forfarshire Association was the Kirrie's last presence in football.

== Colours ==
The club originally played in blue jerseys and knickers. In 1894 it changed to red and blue.

== Ground ==
The club played at Newton Park.

== Nickname ==
One of the club's nicknames, the Auld Lichts, derived from a Calvinist sect which had a high proportion of believers in the Kirriemuir population.
