= 1890–91 Dumbarton F.C. season =

Dumbarton
1890–91 season
- Stadium: Boghead Park, Dumbarton
- Scottish Football League: Champions (Joint)
- Scottish Cup: Runners Up
- Top goalscorer: League: Jack Bell (20); All: John Taylor (28)
Home colours

The 1890–91 season was the 18th Scottish football season in which Dumbarton competed at a national level, entering the inaugural Scottish Football League and the Scottish Cup. In addition Dumbarton played in the Dumbartonshire Cup, the League Charity Cup and the Greenock and District Charity Cup, winning each of them.

== Season ==
=== August ===
The season began with an invitation to play in the Rangers FC Sports eleven-a-side tournament. On 2 August Dumbarton defeated St Mirren 2–0 in the semi-final, but lost out a week later to the hosts, Rangers, 4–1 in the final.

On 16 August the opening games in the inaugural Scottish Football League championship were played, and Dumbarton began their campaign with a home fixture against Cowlairs. The team lined up as McLeod (goal); Hannah and Watson (backs); Keir, Boyle and McMillan (half backs); and Bell, Hutcheson; Mair; Henderson and Taylor (forwards). Taylor scored Dumbarton's first ever league goal after 15 minutes, but shortly thereafter Cowlairs equalised. In the second half Cowlairs were kept hemmed in as the Sons hit every part of the woodwork but the ball would not go in. Taylor scored late on but it was ruled out for offside and the game ended at 1–1.

Football was included as part of the International Exhibition of Science, Art & Industry held in Edinburgh in 1890, and the third game held in this connection was between Dumbarton and Leith Athletic. Wilson from the second XI taking Hutcheson's place was the only change to the team. The game was held in good conditions apart from a strong wind blowing down the pitch meaning most of the play was confined to one end. In the first half the Sons played against the wind and with good defensive play reached the interval only one down. In the second half Dumbarton used the conditions to their advantage and two goals from Wilson and another from Mair gave Dumbarton a 3–1 win.

Three days later, Dumbarton travelled to Cathkin Park, to play Third Lanark in a league fixture. Hutcheson returned to the side. Bell opened his account after 30 minutes but Thirds replied soon after, this being the score at half time. Taylor and Mair restored the Sons advantage and the game finished 3–1.

On 30 August Hearts came to Boghead to fulfil a league fixture. McNaught came in to replace Henderson in the front line and reserve player McDonald played for McMillan. Hearts were first to score but Bell with his third goal in three league games equalised matters just before half time. The Sons came out in the second half intent on pushing forward and goals from Bell and Mair secured a 3–1 win.

At the end of the month, Dumbarton sat in second place in the league with five points from three games, a point behind Rangers.

=== September ===
Dumbarton were drawn away against Smithston Hibs in the first round of the Scottish Cup on 6 September, but as the opponents did not have a suitable standard of ground the match was switched to Boghead. Alex Miller took McDonald's place in the half back line, The Sons were firm favorites for this tie and were a goal ahead from McNaught within five minutes. In the end Dumbarton eased through with an 8–2 win.

The early pace setters in the league, Dumbarton and Rangers met on 13 September at Boghead, An unchanged side took the field, The Sons were quick off the mark and goals from Bell (2) and Mair had the home side well ahead by half time. Dumbarton continued to play strongly in the second half and defeated their rivals 5–1, Bell completing his hat-trick.

After a free week, it was back to Scottish Cup business on 27 September, with Hibernian being the opponents at Easter Road. McDonald came in for Hannah and McMillan returned and replaced Keir. The Sons were ahead within minutes and held a 3–1 lead at half time. In the second half it was all Dumbarton with a further six goals – Taylor completing his hat trick – and a final 9–1 scoreline.

=== October ===
On 4 October Dumbarton entertained near neighbours Vale of Leven for their home league fixture. The team was unchanged. An own goal provided the Sons with the lead but despite having most of the play it was Vale that equalised before half time. The second half began in a similar fashion with the Vale keeper being tested repeatedly. Eventually the Vale's defence was broken and Dumbarton won the tie by 3–1.

A week later it was Abercorn who were the visitors to Boghead on league business, with the only change to the team being the return of Hannah to the defence. Taylor had the Sons two ahead by half time then in the second half Taylor completed his hat trick and a brace from Galbraith finished off a 5–1 thrashing.

Clydebank were drawn at Boghead to play Dumbarton in the third round of the Scottish Cup on 18 October. Dumbarton fielded an unchanged full strength eleven. Taylor (2) and McMillan had the Sons comfortably ahead by half time. A further two from Taylor and one from Bell completed the scoring for a 6–0 victory.

The return league fixture at Cowlairs was played on 25 October. Unfortunately Cowlairs ground was unavailable and the Northern club made their ground available for the tie. The Sons were again able to field their strongest team. The Dumbarton men spend most of the first half swarmed around the Cowlairs goal with scores resulting from three scrimmage and a Bell strike giving the Sons a 4–0 lead. The game was more even in the second half and Cowlairs got one back, only for Bell to get his second and Taylor (his 17th goal of the season) to make the final score 5–1.

So at the end of the month Dumbarton led the league with 13 points from 7 matches, 4 points ahead of Rangers with a game more played.

=== November ===
Following a free week it was back to Scottish Cup business on 8 November, with a fourth round tie against Mossend Swifts at Boghead. The same eleven took to the field. The game was barely seconds old when Mossend scored, but within ten minutes the Sons had scored twice through McNaught to take the lead. Mossend then responded with two goals of their own before McMillan, Mair and Taylor gave Dumbarton a 5-3 half time lead. The second half saw the home side score two more for a final result of 7–3.

On 15 November, eight of the Dumbarton first XI - McLeod; Watson; McMillan; Boyle; Taylor; Galbraith; Mair and McNaught – were selected to play in the county side against Renfrewshire. A 3–1 win was recorded with Taylor scoring two goals and Mair the other.

After a walkover against Dumbarton Albion, Dumbarton played away in the second round of the Dumbartonshire Cup against Duntocher Harp on 22 November. One change was made to the team with Keir returning and Hannah dropping out. Bell Galbraith and Taylor had the Sons well ahead early in the first half, and at the interval the score stood in Dumbarton's favour by 4–2. With the wind and rain at their backs Dumbarton completely dominated in the second half and ran out winners by 10–2.

On 29 November it was to have been the fifth round home tie in the Scottish Cup against 5th KRV, but the referee ruled the pitch unplayable. Instead, they played a friendly, where late goals from Taylor and McMillan gave Dumbarton a 2–0 victory.

=== December ===
The re-run of the postponed Scottish Cup tie against 5th KRV was played on 6 December. An unchanged side took to the field The Sons had little difficulty in breaching the KRV defence and were 6–0 up by half time - Taylor notching a hat-trick (his fourth of the season so far). A further two goals in the second half completed the scoring for an 8–0 victory.

The Dumbartonshire Cup semi-finals were played on 13 December with Dumbarton drawn at home to play Clydebank. Robertson came up from the seconds to give Bell a rest. The Bankies surprised the Sons by scoring first but by half time had turned things around by leading 2–1. A further two goals in the second half made the final score 4–1.

On 20 December, the biggest match of the season so far saw 10,000 spectators crammed into Boghead to witness Dumbarton play Celtic in the Scottish Cup quarter final. The team was back to full strength with the return of Bell. Snow covered the ground and despite the referee being happy for the game to be played Celtic lodged a protest. Mair had the Sons in front at half time and then Mair again and Bell in the second half completed a 3–0 victory. The protest was subsequently dismissed.

The final match of the year involved the away league fixture against Abercorn on 27 December. Once again the full squad was available to play. The Abbies started off the stronger and were ahead but Taylor got the equaliser before half time. Taylor scored again (his 25th of the season) to make the final score a 2–1.

So at the end of 1890, Dumbarton remained unbeaten – leading the league with 15 points from 8 games, six ahead of Rangers - and still going strong in both the national and county cups.

=== January ===
On New Year's Day Dumbarton played in front of a 15,000 crowd at Celtic Park. The Sons played without Keir who was replaced by second XI man Stewart. The Celts were first to score but Dumbarton equalised before half time. No further scoring took place the result being a 1–1 draw which was all the more impressive as Stewart was lost to injury for most of the second half.

Two further friendlies were played on 2 and 3 January with easy wins being recorded against Arbroath (6–0 away) and Kings Park (8–3 home) respectively.

After a blank week on 17 January Dumbarton played Abercorn in the Scottish Cup semi-final at Boghead. The full first XI played with Keir returning to the squad. The Sons were soon ahead from a Galbraith goal and McNaught made it two by the interval. Bell got a third and while the Abbies scored late on, the game was won by 3–1 and Dumbarton were in the final.

On 24 January Dumbarton played their home league fixture against Cambuslang. Watson and Taylor were missing and replaced by Lang (Methlan Park) and Thompson (second XI). McNaught was first to score before Bell scored twice to give the Sons a 3–0 interval lead. Keir and then late on Thompson scored in the second half for an easy 5–0 win.

With no match on 31 January, Dumbarton still headed the league with 17 points from 9 matches.

=== February ===
The 1891 Scottish Cup Final was played on 7 February at Hampden Park, pitting the odds on favorites unbeaten Dumbarton against the surprise package Hearts. Full strength Sons took to the field in front of an 11,000 crowd. Hearts were first to show and were ahead after 13 minutes and held that lead with ease till the interval. After a disappointing first half Dumbarton picked up a little in the second but in the end Hearts were worthy winners.

The following week saw Dumbarton playing in another cup final – this time for the county championship. The venue was Boghead against Vale of Leven and the Sons team was minus Galbraith his place taken by Thompson. Vale were in front after 3 minutes and as was the case in the Scottish final the Sons were finding it difficult to get into the game. In the second half however Dumbarton played to their best and after Mair equalised, Taylor, Bell and Mair again scored for a 4–1 win – lifting the cup for the third season in a row.

On 21 February Celtic visited Boghead on league duty. Lang and Hutcheson replaced McMillan and Mair in the Sons team. The game was fast and exciting throughout and Galbraith had Dumbarton ahead by half time. Celtic came back in the second half and equalised, and although Boyle had the home team ahead once more, the Celts had the final say the game ending a 2–2 draw.

Vale of Leven returned to Boghead on 28 February for a league match. Wilson took the place of McNaught in the attack It only took two minutes for Keir to put Dumbarton ahead, and Taylor and an own goal made it three by half time. Boyle scored the only goal of the second half and the result was a comfortable 4–0 victory.

So at the end of the month Dumbarton would still lead the league with 20 points from 11 matches – leading Rangers by four points.

=== March ===
The beginning of March saw the selection of the teams to play for Scotland in the upcoming British Home Championship. Disputes between the Scottish Football Association and the Scottish League as to priority of players' commitments ensured that few league players would be capped. Indeed, only McMillan was selected from Dumbarton to play against Ireland. In the end he decided instead to play for Dumbarton in a league match.

On 7 March Dumbarton played the first of their league fixtures against St Mirren at Boghead. McNaught returned to the team but McMillan, Taylor and Mair were missing. Surprisingly it was Saints that took the lead after 20 minutes but Bell then McNaught had the Sons ahead by the interval. The second half was all Dumbarton with Bell scoring a further three goals for a 4–1 win. Bell's four-goal haul was all the more remarkable as he had a poisoned hand and spent the whole match with his arm strapped to his chest.

A free week was followed on 21 March by a trip to Cambuslang for the return league match. McMillan and Taylor were back in their respective positions. The Sons were to find the visitors' keeper in fine form and it was Cambuslang that would start the second half a goal ahead. The Dumbarton nerves were restored by goals from Taylor and Bell within five minutes of the restart. The Cambuslang goal continued to survive a barrage of shots but in a break away the Sons conceded to come away with a disappointing 2–2 draw.

On 28 March Third Lanark arrived at Boghead for the return league fixture, where an unchanged side took the field. Bell and then McLeod, who had come out of goals and changed places with Hutcheson, had the Sons two ahead by the interval. Then Hutcheson (who had switched again with McLeod) scored a third before Thirds found the net for the first time. However two further goals for Dumbarton made the final score 5–1.

Two days later Dumbarton travelled to Belfast to play the Distillery on Easter Monday. In a one sided game the Sons returned after an 8–1 win.

So at the end of the month the league race had tightened up – both Dumbarton and Rangers were on 25 points, but Dumbarton had played a game fewer.

=== April ===
On 4 April Dumbarton played Partick Thistle at Cappielow in the semi-final of the Greenock Charity Cup. McKenzie took over in goals while McLeod replaced Boyle in the half back line. Smith replaced Hutcheson at centre forward. Bell scored after ten minutes and another before half time and 2–0 was the score at full time.

The following week, the most important match of the league to date took place at Parkhead as Celtic entertained Dumbarton. Boyle returned to the team and McLeod resumed his place in goals. The Celts were a goal ahead at half time but the game might have turned midway through the second half. Bell scored what he, and most in the ground, thought was the equaliser. However a number of the Celtic defence cried offside and this was agreed by the referee. Some of the Dumbarton players were ready to leave the field in protest but were persuaded to stay. The rest of the game saw the Sons encamped around the Celtic goal but no further scoring took place.

On 18 April, Dumbarton made the trip to Edinburgh to play Hearts in the league. Lang took McMillan's place at right back. The Dumbarton men were anxious to make up in some way for the defeat in the Scottish Cup final and were one ahead from Bell at half time. Further goals from Bell, Taylor and Galbraith were testament to the dominance of the Sons forwards and the game ended 4–0.

The destiny of the league championship was at stake with the meeting against Rangers on 25 April at Ibrox. McMillan was back in the team but it was Rangers that started much the stronger and were ahead within minutes, and by half time were three up. The Gers scored again in the second half before two quick fire goals from Bell brought the Sons back into the game. Dumbarton continued to pile on the pressure but in the end time ran out and the game was lost 4–2.

With one match to play, Dumbarton had 27 points in the league – the same as Rangers with one fewer match played.

=== May ===
Dumbarton played their final league game on 2 May against St Mirren at Paisley. A couple of changes were made with Lang replacing Boyle and James Miller taking Taylor's place. Goals by Galbraith (2) and Bell had the Sons three ahead by half time. The Saints recovered to score midway through the second half, though J Miller restored the three goal lead shortly thereafter. St Mirren scored again at the end to make the score 4–2. At the same time Celtic had beaten Rangers, meaning that Rangers would require to win their game in hand to equal Dumbarton's points total.

The following Monday evening Dumbarton Rangers (Dumbarton's second XI) beat Clydebank's 2nd XI 4–0 to win the Dumbartonshire Second XI Cup – the third scoop of both county cups in succession.

On 9 May while Dumbarton had a rest week, Rangers won their outstanding fixture to tie with Dumbarton at the top of the league, and in the absence of rules to decide on a winner, the League committee decided on a play off.

The semi-final of the new League Charity Cup (set up by the league clubs in Glasgow at short notice after a scheduling dispute with the Glasgow Merchants Charity Cup organisers – Dumbarton took up an invitation to compete) was played at Celtic Park between Dumbarton and Rangers on 16 May. Boyle returned to the team. Both teams played a fast game and play raged from end to end. Taylor opened the scoring for Dumbarton after 30 minutes and that was the score at the interval. The Sons kept up the pressure in the second half but there was no further scoring. Near the end McMillan and a Rangers player had a 'disagreement' and both were sent from the field.

The league decider was played at Cathkin Park on 21 May in front of 10,000 spectators. The team was unchanged from that which had played five days earlier. Rangers were determined to make good their previous disappointing performance and after a spirited first half they led 2–0. After the interval the Sons got down to the task in hand but it wasn't till 20 minutes from time that Taylor got one back. J Miller then scored the equaliser and despite hemming the Gers in for the final minutes a winning goal could not be found. It was subsequently decided that rather than have a further playoff that the Championship be shared.

Over the next two days Dumbarton played two friendlies in a north of Scotland tour (2–2 against Arbroath on 22 May and 6–2 against Aberdeen on 23 May).

On 30 May a friendly was played against Kings Park at Stirling and was won 4–2.

=== June ===
As the football season came to its end, Dumbarton still had two finals to play.

On 3 June the final of the Greenock Charity Cup was decided at Cappielow as Dumbarton played hosts Morton for the second year in succession. Hutcheson returned at centre forward in place of J Miller. The Sons were quickly into their stride and were four up by half time. Play settled down in the second half and a goal for each team made the final score 5–1.

Then on 10 June, Celtic were the opponents in the final of the League Charity Cup at Cathkin Park. Miller was back in the attack As it was Dumbarton saved their best final performance for the crowd of 12,000. Bell opened the scoring and despite constant pressure this was the score at the interval. It was more of the same in the second half and two goals from Taylor ended the season on a high with a 3–0 win and yet another piece of silverware for the Dumbarton trophy cabinet.

== Match results ==
=== Scottish League ===
16 August 1890	Dumbarton	1–1	Cowlairs	Boghead Park
	Taylor 15'		Baker 16'	Attendance: 3,000; Referee: T Robertson

23 August 1890	Third Lanark	1–3	Dumbarton	Cathkin Park
	Johnstone 35'		Bell 30'; Taylor; McMillan	Attendance: 4,000; Referee: Mr Cameron

30 August 1890	Dumbarton	3–1	Hearts	Boghead Park
	Taylor 42'; Bell 60'; Mair		MacPherson 20'	Attendance: 3,000; Referee: Mr Kennedy

13 September 1890	Dumbarton	5–1	Rangers	Boghead Park
	Bell 12'; Mair; Taylor		Hislop 75'	Attendance: 4,000; Referee: Mr McIntyre

4 October 1890	Vale of Leven	1–3	Dumbarton	Millburn Park
	Bruce		McLeod (o.g.) Mair	Attendance: Mr Robertson

11 October 1890	Dumbarton	5–1	Abercorn	Boghead Park
	Taylor 45'; Galbraith		Raeside	Referee: Mr Cameron

25 October 1890	Cowlairs	1–6	Dumbarton	Hyde Park, Glasgow
	70'		(o.g.) (o.g.) (o.g.); Bell; Taylor	Referee: mr Gossland

27 December 1890	Abercorn	1–2	Dumbarton	Underwood Park, Paisley
	Nicol		Taylor	Attendance: 6,000

24 January 1891	Dumbarton	5–0	Cambuslang	Boghead Park
	McNaught 15'; Bell; Kerr 70'; Thomson 89'			Referee: Mr Marshall

21 February 1891	Dumbarton	2–2	Celtic	Boghead Park
	Galbraith 12'; Boyle 65'		Dunbar 69'	Attendance: 6,000

28 February 1891	Dumbarton	4–0	Vale of Leven	Boghead Park
	Keir 2'; Taylor 30'; Wilson 33' (o.g.); Boyle 60'

7 March 1891	Dumbarton	5–1	St Mirren	Boghead Park
	Bell; McNaught		Dunlop 20'	Referee: Mr Marshall

21 March 1891	Cambuslang	2–2	Dumbarton	Whitefield Park
	Brown 80'		Taylor 47'; Bell 48'	Attendance: 3,000

28 March 1891	Dumbarton	5–1	Third Lanark	Boghead Park
	Bell 30'; McLeod 40'; Hutcheson; Taylor (o.g.)		Thomson	Referee: Mr Marshall

11 April 1891	Celtic	1–0	Dumbarton	Celtic Park
	Keir 25' (o.g.)			Attendance: 10,000; Referee: Mr Robertson

20 April 1891	Hearts	0–4	Dumbarton	Tynecastle Stadium
			Taylor 40'; Bell; Galbraith 90'	Attendance: 5,500; Referee: Mr Heggie

25 April 1891	Rangers	4–2	Dumbarton	Ibrox Park
	McCreadie, A 3'; Hislop 15'; Keir 35' (o.g.); McPherson 65'		Bell 70'	Attendance: 12,000

2 May 1891	St Mirren	2–4	Dumbarton	Westmarch
	Morrison 65'; Dunlop		Galbriath 20', 42'; Bell; Miller, J	Attendance: 3,000

=== Scottish League Play Off ===
21 May 1891 Championship play-off	Dumbarton	2–2	Rangers	Cathkin Park
	Taylor; Miller, J		Hislop; McCreadie, H	Attendance: 10,000

=== Scottish Cup ===
6 September 1890 First round	Dumbarton	8–2	Smithston Hibernian	Boghead Park
	McNaught 5'; Taylor; Galbraith (o.g.)		Goal

27 September 1890 Second round	Hibernian	1–9	Dumbarton	Easter Road
	McMahon		Taylor; Galbraith; Boyle; Mair; McNaught; Bell	Attendance: 3,000; Referee: Mr Melsih

18 October 1890 Third round	Dumbarton	6–0	Clydebank	Boghead Park
	Taylor 15' 20' 50'; McMillan; Bell

8 November 1890 Fourth round	Dumbarton	7–3	Mossend Swifts	Boghead Park
	McNaught; McMillan; Mair; Taylor; Miller, A Galbraith		Watson 1' (o.g.); Ellis; Boyd

6 December 1890 Fifth round	Dumbarton	8–0	5th KRV	Boghead Park
	Taylor 10'; Bell; McNaught; Boyle; Galbraith

20 December 1890 Quarter-finals	Dumbarton	3–0	Celtic	Boghead Park
	Mair 1', 55'; Bell 75'			Attendance: 10,000; Referee: Mr Dunn

17 January 1891 Semi-final	Dumbarton	3–1	Abercorn	Boghead Park
	Galbraith; McNaught; Bell		Goal	Attendance: 10,000; Referee: Mr Dunn

7 February 1891 Final	Dumbarton	0–1	Hearts	Hampden Park
			Russell 13'	Attendance: 10,836; Referee: Mr Park

=== Dumbartonshire Cup ===
Round 1	Dumbarton	WO	Dumbarton Albion

22 November 1890 Round 2	Duntocher Harp	2–10	Dumbarton	St Helens Park, Duntocher
	Goal		Bell 5'; Galbraith; Taylor

13 December 1890 Semi-final	Clydebank	1–4	Dumbarton	Hamilton Park, Clydebank
	Goal		Boyle; Mair; Taylor (o.g.)

14 February 1891 Final	Dumbarton	4–1	Vale of Leven	Boghead Park
	Mair; Taylor; Bell		Graham 3'	Attendance: 4,000

=== League Charity Cup ===
16 May 1891 Semi-final	Rangers	0–1	Dumbarton	Celtic Park
			Taylor 30'	Attendance: 7,000; Referee: Mr Bishop

10 June 1891 Final	Celtic	0–3	Dumbarton	Cathkin Park
			Bell 15'; Taylor 50', 80'	Attendance: 8,000; Referee: Mr Marshall

=== Rangers Sports Tournament ===
2 August 1890 Semi-final	Dumbarton	2–0	St Mirren	Ibrox Park
	Henderson; Bell 47'			Attendance: 5,000

9 August 1890 Final	Rangers	3–1	Dumbarton	Ibrox Park
	Hislop 75'; McPherson		42'

=== Greenock & District Charity Cup ===
4 April 1891 Semi-final	Partick Thistle	0–2	Dumbarton	Cappielow Park
			Bell 10'	Attendance: 4,000

6 June 1891 Final	Morton	1–5	Dumbarton	Cappielow Park
	Goal		Taylor; Galbraith; Bell	Attendance: 4,000; Referee: Mr Rose

=== Friendlies ===
20 August 1890 Friendly	Leith Athletic	1–3	Dumbarton	Recreation Ground, Edinburgh
	McInroy 10'		Wilson 65'; Mair	Attendance: 5,500; Referee: J McDowall

29 November 1890 Friendly	Dumbarton	2–0	5th KRV	Boghead Park
	Taylor; McMillan 80'			Attendance: 5,500; Referee: R Young

1 January 1891 Friendly	Celtic	1–1	Dumbarton	Celtic Park
	Maley 20'		Taylor	Attendance: 15,000; Referee: Mr Robertson

2 January 1891 Friendly	Arbroath	0–6	Dumbarton	Gayfield Park
			Taylor McNaught

3 January 1891 Friendly	Dumbarton	8–3	King's Park	Boghead Park
	Taylor 5'; Bell; Mirk (o.g.); Watson; Mair		Gray; Thomson, J Ferguson 45'	Attendance: 2,000; Referee: Mr Thomson

30 March 1891 Friendly	(Ireland) Belfast Distillery	1–8	Dumbarton	Grosvenor Park, Belfast
	Stansfield		Taylor; Bell

22 May 1891 Friendly	Arbroath	2–2	Dumbarton	Gayfield Park
	Smith, John; Smith, Jim		Miller, J Bell

23 May 1891 Friendly	Aberdeen	2–6	Dumbarton	The Chanonry, Aberdeen
	Watson (o.g.); Leggat		Galbraith; Boyle; Taylor; Miller, J scrimmage	Attendance: 5,000

30 May 1891 Friendly	King's Park	2–4	Dumbarton	Stirling
	Ferguson 10'; Millar		Miller, J McNaught	Attendance: 500; Referee: Mr Seaton

== Player statistics ==
Amongst those leaving the club from the first XI were Ralph Aitken to Newcastle West End, Duncan Stewart to Port Glasgow Athletic and Joe Lindsay to Renton. The first XI was enhanced by John Taylor and Daniel Watson stepping up from the reserves and also James McNaught joining from Methlan Park.

Jack Bell became the first ever League topscorer with 20 goals. However, his partner 'up front' John Taylor scored more competitive goals in total - 33 to Bell's 31.

No.	Pos	Nat	Player	Total		Scottish League		Scottish Cup	
No.	Pos	Nat	Player	Apps	Goals	Apps	Goals	Apps	Goals
	GK	(Scotland) SCO	John McLeod	27	1	19	1	8	0
	DF	(Scotland) SCO	John Hannah	9	0	6	0	3	0
	DF	(Scotland) SCO	Alex McDonald	3	0	2	0	1	0
	DF	(Scotland) SCO	Alex Miller	24	1	16	0	8	1
	DF	(Scotland) SCO	Daniel Watson	26	0	18	0	8	0
	MF	(Scotland) SCO	Dickie Boyle	26	4	18	2	8	2
	MF	(Scotland) SCO	Jones	1	0	1	0	0	0
	MF	(Scotland) SCO	Leitch Keir	21	1	16	1	5	0
	MF	(Scotland) SCO	Alex Lang	5	0	5	0	0	0
	MF	(Scotland) SCO	Tom McMillan	20	3	13	1	7	2
	FW	(Scotland) SCO	Jack Bell	27	25	19	20	8	5
	FW	(Scotland) SCO	James Galbraith	26	12	18	6	8	6
	FW	(Scotland) SCO	William Henderson	1	0	1	0	0	0
	FW	(Scotland) SCO	Alex Hutcheson	6	1	6	1	0	0
	FW	(Scotland) SCO	Neil Kerr	1	1	1	1	0	0
	FW	(Scotland) SCO	Hugh Mair	16	7	8	3	8	4
	FW	(Scotland) SCO	James McNaught	25	9	17	2	8	7
	FW	(Scotland) SCO	John Miller	2	2	2	2	0	0
	FW	(Scotland) SCO	John Taylor	24	28	16	15	8	13
	FW	(Scotland) SCO	William Thomson	2	1	2	1	0	0
	FW	(Scotland) SCO	Wilson	5	0	5	0	0	0

== Reserve team ==
Dumbarton were defeated by Queen's Park in the second round of the Scottish Second XI Cup, but retained the Dumbartonshire Second XI Cup for the third successive year with a win in the final over Clydebank.
