= 1889–90 Dumbarton F.C. season =

Dumbarton
1889–90 season
- Stadium: Boghead Park, Dumbarton
- Scottish Cup: Third Round
Home colours

The 1889–90 season was the 17th Scottish football season in which Dumbarton competed at a national level.

== Story of the Season ==
=== August ===
The season began on 10 August with an away fixture against local county side, Kirkintilloch Athletic. A scratch side was fielded with seven first team regulars missing and only McLeod of the demised Dumbarton Athletic turning out at full back. The game was a poor one that the Sons lost 4–2.

The following week Dumbarton were invited to play the first game at Leith Athletic's new ground. While not at full strength, Dewar, McMillan and Stewart returned and McLeod played in his preferred position as keeper. Play was much improved on the previous week resulting in a 6–3 win. At the same time it was learned that Alex Latta formerly of Dumbarton Athletic and whose attacking skills were undoubted, had decided to turn professional and move to Everton.

On 22 August Dumbarton travelled to neighbours Clydebank. The Sons were still under strength but Watson played his first game in a Dumbarton shirt. The play was mixed and in the end a 3–3 draw was a fair result.

Two days later, Boghead hosted its opening game of the season against Methlan Park. The selection committee continued to try different combinations to ascertain the best eleven for the upcoming cup matches. A rather scrappy game finished in a 1–1 draw.

Dumbarton were the first visitors of the season to Celtic Park on 29 August. The return of Keir and Joe Lindsay for their first games of the season meant a more recognisable team took the field. Miller shocked the 5,000 crowd by opening the scoring for Dumbarton after five minutes and the Sons play continued to be of a fine calibre though the Celts equalised before half time. Both teams strived for a winner in the second half but in the end the result stood at 1-1.

=== September ===
Dumbarton opened up their Scottish Cup campaign on 7 September. The draw was still made on a regional basis and it was perhaps unfortunate that Dumbarton had to play one of the other favourites for the competition, Vale of Leven, at Alexandria. The team that took the field was McLeod (goal); Stewart and Hannah (full backs); McMillan; Boyle and Keir (half backs); and Fraser, Weir, Bell, Mair and Alex Miller (forwards). In a tight game the Vale showed up more than the Sons in front of goal but both defences stood firm for a 0–0 draw.

A week later the replay took place at Boghead with the same eleven taking the field. In a lively game Vale opened the scoring in the first half but after the interval Mair managed to score to make the final score 1-1. In the draw made by the SFA on the following Tuesday both Dumbarton and Vale of Leven were advanced to the next round.

On 21 September Hearts visited Boghead. The team was weakened by the loss of Hannah and Keir who were both unfit and Weir who had moved south to play professional at Gateshead. Hearts were first to score but Mair had the Sons level by half time. After the restart both teams contributed to a fast and equal game but it was Hearts who found the net for a 2–1 win.

The following weekend pitted Dumbarton against Renton in the Scottish Cup at Tontine Park. Former Dumbarton Athletic players, James Galbraith and Joe Lindsay took their places in the team for this vital match. The Sons were quick off the mark and Fraser gave them the lead after seven minutes. Lindsay scored a second after 25 minutes and this was the state of play at the interval. Renton pushed hard in the second half and managed a goal with ten minutes remaining but the victory was Dumbarton's by 2–1.

=== October ===
Dumbarton made a visit to Hampden Park to play Queen's Park on 5 October. Hannah and Bell returned to the side. Both teams opened up well but despite chances at each end the interval arrived goalless. Fast attacking play continued and Queens managed to score ten minutes into the second half. This however was the only goal of the game.

On 12 October, Stewart; McMillan; McLeod and Bell played in the Dumbartonshire county side against Ayrshire at Ayr, and were on the losing side by 1–4. On the same day, Dumbarton minus the county reps met their neighbours Union at Boghead, but despite the missing talent managed a 2–0 win with goals from Mair and Chapman.

The following Saturday it was the third round of the Scottish Cup with a home tie against cup holders 3rd LRV. A full strength side was available. Both teams started well but it was the Thirds who crossed over at half time a goal to the good. The Sons recovered in the second half and a Boyle goal secured a 1–1 draw and a replay.

The teams met again on 26 October at Cathkin Park and it was another titanic struggle. The same eleven took to the field but it was the holders who prevailed 1–0.

=== November ===
With interest in the Scottish Cup at an end, Dumbarton turned their attention to the Dumbartonshire Cup, and on 2 November played Kirkintilloch Athletic in the first round. Stewart was missing from the squad, but with a goal in each half from Aitken and Fraser, the Sons advanced to the next round.

The following week Dumbarton were on their travels again with a visit to Thistle in Glasgow. Five regulars were missing and replaced by second XI players. Nevertheless, an own goal and a strike from Bell was sufficient for a 2–0 win.

On 16 November, Jamestown were visitors to Boghead in the second round of the county cup. A full strength team was available with the exception of the addition of William Thomson. Jamestown managed to hold off the Sons attack for 15 minutes but as soon as McMillan scored the first it was then a question of how many. Two more in the first half followed by four in the second resulted in a 7–1 rout.

Then a week later saw the season's second trip to Glasgow to play Celtic. Due to injuries a team reshuffle was required, with notably McLeod coming out of goal to play at left half. Despite the missing team members, Dumbarton started well but found themselves a goal down at the interval. Another Celtic goal was scored early in the second half but two goals in the final 15 minutes ensured that the Sons carved out a 2–2 draw.

On 30 November Dumbarton played Cowlairs at Boghead. Hannah was a returnee to the team but in poor conditions Dumbarton's luck in front of goal deserted them. From a breakaway Colwairs scored 15 minutes into the second half but Bell got the equaliser 10 minutes later. Continued pressure brought no further goals the result being a 1–1 draw.

=== December ===
Methlan Park arrived at Boghead on 7 December to contest the semi-final of the Dumbartonshire Cup. Lindsay returned to the front line. The Sons started well and on 20 minutes Chapman put the home side in front. Methlan equalised before half time but in the second half goals from Mair, Bell and one from a scrimmage resulted in a comfortable 4–1 victory for Dumbarton.

Dumbarton made a visit to Abercorn on 14 December. Second XI player Goodwin was given a start on the left wing. Galbraith was first to score for the Sons and the home side equalised before half time. Goodwin restored the lead early in the second half and soon thereafter an Abercorn player had to leave the field injured. Play then became a bit ‘rough’ and through a free kick Abercorn brought the score level again. The 10 men continued the pressure and in the process of scoring their third goal the Abercorn scorer was severely injured and had to be carried from the field Despite the handicap of playing with only 9 men, the home team secured a 3–2 win.

On 21 December, it was a home game against Partick Thistle, McMillan and Bell were missing from the Sons line up. Galbraith scored his second goal in successive games within minutes to put the home side one up and Goodwin also scored but this time it was into his own goal leaving the half time score at 1-1. Partick went ahead early in the second half but a last minute goal from Mair rescued a 2–2 draw.

The final game of 1889 saw a local derby against Renton at Boghead. Bell and McMillan returned but Stewart and Fraser did not play. Dumbarton were two ahead at half time but early into the second half Renton had managed to equalise. The Sons then retook the lead only for Renton to put through just on time to make the final score 3-3.

=== January ===
The New Year's holiday was taken up with a tour of north Scotland and Fife. The hectic schedule began with a trouncing by Forfar Athletic 0–7, but improved greatly over the next three days with wins over Our Boys Dundee (4–1), Arbroath (8–3) and Dunfermline (8–0).

On 11 January, Dumbarton visited Tynecastle with a ‘scratch’ team which was missing 5 regulars. Nonetheless, a McLeod double (who was playing outfield rather than his usual place between the posts) was enough to secure a 2–2 draw. Interestingly Hearts ‘scored’ a third goal which the referee allowed, but following a Dumbarton protest, the Hearts players agreed that the ball had gone over the bar, and persuaded the referee that the goal be disallowed.

Following a free week, it was Kilmarnock who were visitors to Boghead. The team took on a more recognizable look but McLeod maintained his place in the attack. Bell equalised an earlier Kilmarnock goal before half time and Bell with his second half and Mair scored in the second for a final score of 3–1.

=== February ===
The month began with a free week for Dumbarton – but not its players. Two inter-county games were played on 1 February, with McMillan; Keir; Bell and Galbraith playing against the East of Scotland and McLeod; Hannah and Lindsay playing against Renfrewshire. Both games were lost, 3-5 and 3-7 respectively.

After a blank week due to fog, on 15 February the Scottish Cup final between Queens Park and Vale of Leven was played. While the Dumbarton first XI did not play the Sons second string were represented in the final of the Scottish Second XI Cup against Rangers, but finished as runners-up after a 1–0 defeat.

On 22 February Dumbarton played a match against neighbours Methlan Park at Boghead. Taylor replaced Keir and Goodwin maintained his place in an otherwise full strength team. Goals from Bell in the first half and Galbraith and Aitken in the second made for a comfortable 3–0 win.

=== March ===
At Boghead on 1 March, Dumbarton, the county cupholders faced Vale of Leven, runners up in the Scottish Cup the week previously, in the final of the county championship. Keir returned at left half and Hutcheson replaced Taylor in the attack Despite being underdogs, Galbraith scored a goal in each half and it was Dumbarton who would retain the cup with a 2–0 win.

A week later, while Dumbarton first XI rested up, a trial match was held at Celtic Park to decide on the players to represent Scotland in the upcoming Home Internationals, with both John Bell and John McLeod selected to take part. At the same time the second XIs of Dumbarton and Vale of Leven met to decide on the destination of the Dumbartonshire Second XI Cup, and Dumbarton made it a county double with an easy 7–1 win.

On 15 March, Dumbarton visited Renton for a local derby match. A strong Sons team took the field minus McMillan, and played up well with Mair scoring for a half time lead. In the second half Mair completed his hat trick and another from Hutcheson made the final score 4–0.

Dumbarton played a ‘scratch’ team as they hosted a trial match for the Dumbartonshire Junior Association XI on 22 March. The juniors put up stiff opposition before going down to the senior team by 3–2.

On 29 March, Scotland played Ireland in Belfast. John McLeod and John Bell were both capped for this match – which resulted in a 4–1 win for the Scots. On the same day, Dumbarton travelled to Kilmarnock, and despite the missing personnel, returned with a 2–1 win.

=== April ===
The month began with a local derby at home against Clydebank on 5 April. The Bankies scored first but the Sons equalised when the Clydebank keeper scored an own goal. By half time Dumbarton had increased their score to three and another in the second half made the final result 4–1.

Two days later as part of the Easter holidays Dumbarton set sail for their first ‘overseas’ challenge, and played out an exciting 4–4 draw with Belfast Distillery. Thomson, McDonald and Galbraith had the Sons 3-1 ahead at halftime but despite another from Galbraith the Belfast side fought back for the draw.

On 12 April Dumbarton played Glasgow Thistle in the first round of a tournament organised by Glasgow Hibernians. The Sons were missing three of their cup team but played well to deserve a half time lead from a Galbraith goal. The second half was completely one-sided and the Thistle were brushed aside 6–1.

The following week, while the team rested, three of the players, Hannah; McMillan and Boyle, were on county duty, with Dumbartonshire losing 2–4 to North Eastern Glasgow, McMillan scoring one of the goals.

On 24 April, Dumbarton travelled to Edinburgh to play St Bernards. Four regulars were missing but the Sons managed to come out on top by 5–3

A couple of days later Dumbarton played their first tie in the Greenock Charity Cup against Dykebar at Cappielow. The Sons were on top from the start and were two up within 10 minutes. In the end Dumbarton came away with a fine 6–0 victory.

=== May ===
May began with a match on the 3rd against Rangers at Ibrox. Boyle and Keir were amongst those of the ‘cup’ team missing from the team. Rangers were first to get on the score card but Mair equalised for Dumbarton in the second half for a 1–1 draw.

It was not until 24 May that Dumbarton played their next match – coincidentally again against Rangers at Ibrox. This time it was in the first tie of a competition for the benefit of United Abstainers FC. The Sons were near full strength and with goals from McMillan, Bell and an own goal the Sons secured a 3–2 win.

On 31 May another piece of silverware was up for grabs as Dumbarton took on Morton at Cappielow in the final of the Greenock Charity Cup. The Sons fielded the same team. Taylor had the Sons two ahead within six minutes. Bell made it three and it was four before half time. The domination continued in the second half as Dumbarton won the cup by 9–0.

=== June ===
Only one tie remained to be decided at the beginning of June and that was the result of the United Abstainers FC tournament, which pitted Dumbarton against Third Lanark. On 5 June the teams turned out at Ibrox Park and fought out a goalless draw, but in the replay a fortnight later, it was Third Lanark who got the decisive goal in a close encounter.

=== Post Season Notes ===
The season ended with the publication of the fixture list for the first ever Scottish Football League – Dumbarton's first tie would be against Cowlairs at home on 16 August. However one honour had already been achieved with former player Alex Lawrance of Dumbarton being voted in as Chairman of the League.

== Results ==
=== Scottish Cup ===
7 September 1889 Cup R1	Vale of Leven	0–0	Dumbarton	Millburn Park
				Attendance: 4,000; Referee: Mr Robertson

14 September 1889 Cup R1r	Dumbarton	1–1	Vale of Leven	Boghead Park
	Mair 77'		Walker 30'	Attendance: 4,000; Referee: Mr Cameron

28 September 1889 Cup R2	Renton	1–2	Dumbarton	Tontine Park
	scrimmage 82'		Fraser 7'; Lindsay 25'	Attendance: 4,000; Referee: Mr Robertson

19 October 1889 Cup R3	Dumbarton	1–1	3rd LRV	Boghead Park
	Boyle		scrimmage	Attendance: 4,000; Referee: Mr Sneddon

26 October 1889 Cup R3	3rd LRV	1–0	Dumbarton	Cathkin Park
	Burke 55'			Attendance: 4,000; Referee: Mr Sneddon

=== Dumbartonshire Cup ===
2 November 1889 First round	Kirkintilloch Athletic	0–2	Dumbarton	Kirkintilloch
			Aitken; Fraser

16 November 1889 Second round	Dumbarton	7–1	Jamestown	Boghead PArk
	McMillan 15'; Bell Mair		McKay

7 December 1889 Semi-final	Dumbarton	4–1	Methlan Park	Boghead Park
	Chapman 20'; Mair scrimmage McGregor (o.g.)		McNaught

1 March 1890 Final	Dumbarton	2–0	Vale of Leven	Boghead Park
	Galbraith 10', 70'			Attendance: 5,000

=== Greenock & District Charity Cup ===
26 April 1890 Semi-final	Dykebar	0–6	Dumbarton	Cappielow Park
			5'; Aitken 10' Bell	Attendance: 2,000

31 May 1890 Final	Morton	1–9	Dumbarton	Cappielow Park
	Coates		Taylor 5', 6'; Bell 7'; McDonald; McMillan 46'; 50'	Attendance: 2,000

=== United Abstainers F.C. Gold Cup ===
24 May 1890 Semi-final	Rangers	2–3	Dumbarton	Ibrox Park
	Bowie; Hislop		Galbraith; Mair; Hislop (o.g.)	Attendance: 2,000; Referee: Mr Mackay

5 June 1890 Final	3rd LRV	0–0	Dumbarton	Ibrox Park
				Attendance: 5,000; Referee: T Park

17 June 1890 Final replay	3rd LRV	1–0	Dumbarton	Ibrox Park
	Thomson 55'			Attendance: 6,000; Referee: T Park

=== Friendlies ===
10 August 1889 Friendly	Kirkintilloch Athletic	4–2	Dumbarton	Hawkhill
	Comrie; Gray; McNab		McKinnon 30'; Mair 43'

17 August 1889 Friendly	Leith Athletic	3–6	Dumbarton	Bank Park, Leith
	Laing McLeod		Bell Weir	Referee: F Watt

22 August 1889 Friendly	Clydebank	3–3	Dumbarton	Clydebank
	Stewart scrimmage 50'		Weir; McMillan; 60'

24 August 1889 Friendly	Dumbarton	1–1	Methlan Park	Boghead Park
	47'		scrimmage 20'	Attendance: 600

31 August 1889 Friendly	Celtic	1–1	Dumbarton	Celtic Park
	Gallacher 30'		Miller 5'	Attendance: 5,000; Referee: Mr Robertson

21 September 1889 Friendly	Dumbarton	1–2	Hearts	Boghead Park
	Mair		Baird 25'; Jenkinson	Referee: A McLean

5 October 1889 Friendly	Queen's Park	1–0	Dumbarton	Hampden Park
	Hamilton 55'			Attendance: 1,000

12 October 1889 Friendly	Dumbarton	2–0	Union (Dumbarton)	Boghead Park
	Mair 30'; Chapman 47'

9 November 1889 Friendly	Thistle	0–2	Dumbarton	Beechwood Park, Glasgow
			Hannah (o.g.); Bell 80'

23 November 1889 Friendly	Celtic	2–2	Dumbarton	Celtic Park
	Dowds 20'; McLaren 47'		Galbraith 75'; Lindsay 90'	Attendance: 3,000

30 November 1889 Friendly	Dumbarton	1–1	Cowlairs	Boghead Park
	Bell		60'

14 December 1889 Friendly	Abercorn	3–2	Dumbarton	Underwood Park
	McLardie		Galbraith 1'; Goodwin 50'

21 December 1889 Friendly	Dumbarton	2–2	Partick Thistle	Boghead Park
	Galbraith 3'; Mair 87'		Goodwin 5' (o.g.); Drummond 50'

28 December 1889 Friendly	Dumbarton	3–3	Renton	Boghead Park
	Mair scrimmage 78'		Brown; McIntyre	Attendance: 2,000

1 January 1890 Friendly	Forfar Athletic	7–0	Dumbarton	Station Park, Forfar
	scrimmage 10'; Dundas; Bowman; Mann; Lindsay

2 January 1890 Friendly	Our Boys Dundee	1–4	Dumbarton	West Craigie Park, Dundee
	Butters		Bell 20' 30'; Fraser 60'

3 January 1890 Friendly	Arbroath	3–8	Dumbarton	Gayfield Park
	Robertson; Smith		O'Kane (o.g.) scrimmage Aitken; Bell; McMillan	Attendance: 2,000

4 January 1890 Friendly	Dunfermline Athletic	0–8	Dumbarton	East End Park
			Goal

11 January 1890 Friendly	Hearts	2–2	Dumbarton	Tynecastle Stadium
	Scott; Greirson		McLeod

25 January 1890 Friendly	Dumbarton	3–1	Kilmarnock	Boghead Park
	Bell 70'; Mair		Hannah 20' (o.g.)

22 February 1890 Friendly	Dumbarton	3–0	Methlan Park	Boghead Park
	Bell 30'; Galbraith; Aitken

15 March 1890 Friendly	Renton	0–4	Dumbarton	Tontine Park
			Mair 55'; Hutcheson

22 March 1890 Friendly	Dumbarton	3–2	Dumbartonshire Junior Association XI	Boghead Park
	Goal		Goal

29 March 1890 Friendly	Kilmarnock	1–2	Dumbarton	Rugby Park
	Wark		Mair 30'; 89'	Attendance: 4,000

5 April 1890 Friendly	Dumbarton	4–1	Clydebank	Boghead Park
	scrimmage (o.g.)		Goal

7 April 1890 Friendly	(Ireland) Belfast Distillery	4–4	Dumbarton	Grosvenor Park, Belfast
	Goal		Thomson; McDonald; Galbraith	Attendance: 3,000

12 April 1890 Friendly	Dumbarton	6–1	Thistle	Hibernian Park, Glasgow
	Galbraith		Goal

24 April 1890 Friendly	St Bernard's	3–5	Dumbarton	Logie Green, Edinburgh
	scrimmage Groves; Henderson		Galbraith; Chapman; Taylor	Referee: W Waugh

3 May 1890 Friendly	Rangers	1–1	Dumbarton	Ibrox Park
	McPherson 43'		Mair 90'

== Player statistics ==
Amongst those leaving the club from the first XI were, John Madden to Celtic, William Lapsley to Third Lanark, Geordie Dewar to Blackburn Rovers and James Bell to Aston Villa.

Those joining the first XI included a number of players following the ‘amalgamation’ with near neighbours Dumbarton Athletic, notable among those being Joe Lindsay, James Galbraith, John McLeod and Daniel Watson. In addition John Taylor joined from Newtown Thistle.

Only includes appearances and goals in competitive Scottish Cup matches.

Player	Position	Appearances	Goals
(Scotland) John McLeod	GK	5	0
(Scotland) John Hannah	DF	4	0
(Scotland) Duncan Stewart	DF	5	0
(Scotland) Dickie Boyle	MF	5	1
(Scotland) Leitch Keir	MF	5	0
(Scotland) Alex McDonald	MF	1	0
(Scotland) Tom McMillan	MF	4	0
(Scotland) Ralph Aitken	FW	3	0
(Scotland) Jack Bell	FW	5	0
(Scotland) James Fraser	FW	5	1
(Scotland) James Galbraith	FW	5	0
(Scotland) Joe Lindsay	FW	3	1
(Scotland) Hugh Mair	FW	2	1
(Scotland) Alex Miller	FW	3	0
(Scotland) James Weir	FW	2	0

== Reserve team ==
Dumbarton reached the third round of the Scottish Second XI Cup before losing out to Queen's Park in a replay. However the Dumbartonshire Second XI Cup was retained after a win in the final over Vale of Leven.
