= 1894–95 Dumbarton F.C. season =

Dumbarton
1894–95 season
- Stadium: Boghead Park, Dumbarton
- Scottish League Division One: 9th
- Scottish Cup: Second Round
- Top goalscorer: League: William Campbell (7); All: William Campbell/ Hugh Craig (7)
Home colours

The 1894–95 season was the 22nd Scottish football season in which Dumbarton competed at national level, entering the Scottish Football League and the Scottish Cup. In addition Dumbarton played in the Dumbartonshire Cup.

== Story of the Season ==
=== August ===
On 11 August Dumbarton travelled down the coast to open Somerset Park for the season and came away with a 1–1 draw.

The first real test for the new look Dumbarton team came a week later with a visit to Ibrox in the league. Rangers ran out easy 3–0 winners, but it was not all gloom as the result may have been different but for the lack of a Dumbarton striker.

=== September ===
After a free week, Dumbarton entertained Leith Athletic in the league and recorded their first win by 3–2. Leith however were not aided by an injury to one of their players requiring them to play with a man short for most of the second half.

On 8 September it was a trip north for a league match against Dundee and after holding their own in the first half it was the home side who triumphed 3–0.

A week later St Bernards were entertained at Boghead and after well contested game it was the visitors who left with both points after a 4–3 win.

On 22 September, Dumbarton travelled to Paisley to play St Mirren in the league. Goal scoring was no problem but it would be their old colleague John Taylor who did the damage by scoring a hat-trick for the Saints in a second 4–3 defeat in a row.

The run of defeats continued a week later when unbeaten league leaders Hearts left Boghead having inflicted a crushing 4–1 defeat on the Dumbarton men.

So at the end of September Hearts led the league with 10 points from 5 matches, followed by Rangers with the same number of points from 6 games. Dumbarton lagged at the bottom along with Leith and Third Lanark with just one win to show from 6 games.

=== October ===
After a free week, Dundee came to Boghead to fulfil the return league fixture and unfortunately the result was no different with a 4–2 defeat being suffered. As in previous weeks the problem seemed to be staying power as Dumbarton led 2-1 going into the second half. In addition an injury to D Thomson required yet a further call on the 2nd XI with James Hartley being the newest recruit so far.

The downward spiral continued on 13 October when a visit to Parkhead finished in a 6–0 thrashing from Celtic.

And it was no different the following week where Dumbarton continued their travels, this time to Tynecastle, and suffered a 3–1 defeat to unbeaten Hearts.

At the end of October Hearts were running away at the top of the league unbeaten with 18 points from 9 games followed by Rangers with 12 points from 8 games. Dumbarton were marooned at the bottom with 2 points to show from their 9 games.

=== November ===
A home game at Boghead on 3 November against Clyde brought some hope of a return to winning ways, but things were against Dumbarton from the start as Tom McMillan was missing due to injury requiring a shuffling of the pack. As it happened his defensive skills were much missed as Clyde left with a 2–1 victory.

The return of McMillan a week later against Third Lanark at Cathkin Park did little to stem the run of bad results and Dumbarton left having suffered a 6–3 beating. Again it was a case of holding their own until the latter stages of the game before tiring badly. It proved however to be Tom McMillan's final appearance for the club - during his ten seasons he set a record of 111 appearances in all national competitive matches.

On 17 November Dumbarton travelled to Cappielow in a friendly against Second Division Morton. The match was evenly contested but finished in a 2–1 victory for the home side.

A week later there was a welcome relief from the league with Dumbarton's first tie in the Scottish Cup. However this was no walkover with the visit of Ayrshire side Galston who had already a few scalps to their name in the competition. Being his 100th appearance for Dumbarton, McLeod switched to striker with 2nd XI player, Robert Colquhoun replacing him as goalkeeper, and while his effect up front was ineffectual, Dumbarton managed to scramble a 2–1 win.

The league at the end of November looked more and more like Hearts for the taking with 11 wins from 11 games, Rangers trailing 8 points behind, though with 2 games less played. Dumbarton sat at the bottom with their solitary win.

=== December ===
The first Saturday in December saw a return to league duty and the daunting visit of Rangers to Boghead. Rangers were trying their best to keep pace with league leaders Hearts but on Dumbarton's side was that Rangers had not yet won a league match at Boghead. As it was Rangers wait would be extended for a further season with Dumbarton pulling off an incredible 1–0 victory.

On 8 December Dumbarton carried forward their new found confidence with a friendly win at Alexandria against Vale of Leven by 3–1.

The mini revival came to an end the following weekend with a 2-1 second round Scottish Cup defeat against King's Park at Stirling. The task was more challenging than would have been the case with the loss of Tom McMillan and yet another 2nd XI debutant, George Jackson, taking his place in the team.

Things went from bad to worse on 23 December when Dumbarton returned from Edinburgh having suffered a 5-0 league thrashing from St Bernards.

On the last day of the year Dumbarton played a friendly at Tontine Park against neighbours Renton and came away with a 2–1 win.

The league at the end of 1894 still looked like a stroll for Hearts, though having tasted defeat for the first time, they headed Rangers by 6 points with 6 games to play. Dumbarton were joined at the bottom by Leith Athletic both with 2 wins.

=== January ===
The first two weekends in January saw little football due to frost, but on 19 January Dumbarton and Vale of Leven turned out to play the semi-final of the county cup at Boghead. The state of the pitch was still considered unplayable by the referee, nevertheless a friendly was played which ended in a 1–1 draw.

The weather put paid to the rest of the month.

=== February ===
Whilst freezing conditions continued to play havoc with club matches, William Thomson played for the Scottish League XI against the Irish League in Belfast on 2 February – the Scots winning 4–1.

=== March ===
Dumbarton returned to competitive football for the first time in over two months on 2 March but the tale of woe continued with another league defeat this time to Third Lanark at Bognead losing 4–2. Again it was a case of the Dumbarton men failing to last the pace as they held their opponents at 2-2 till late in the game.

Another home league game was played a week later this time against Celtic and while the result was yet another defeat the scoreline of 2-0 reflected the stiff resistance put up by the home side.

The league game against Clyde on 16 March was another of those which had marked most of the season – Dumbarton having most of the play – 1–0 up at half time – then fell away as the game went on – eventually losing 3–1.

After a free week Dumbarton played their penultimate league match against St Mirren at Boghead on 30 March. As had been the case for most of the season Dumbarton put on agreat show in the first half and led 2-0 – but unlike the rest of the season this time they maintained their form and ran out 4–1 winners.

So at the end of March – Hearts having long ago secured the championship, the only matter to be decided in the league was who would join Dumbarton and Leith Athletic in the bottom 3 places and be subject to the dreaded election process for relegation.

=== April ===
The final league game of the season took place on 6 April against fellow strugglers Leith Athletic in Edinburgh. A win would see Dumbarton lift themselves off the bottom of the table but this would be a hard ask as not a single point had been earned away from Boghead all season. As it was the result was a 1–1 draw and both clubs finished on equal records.

The Easter weekend was spent across the border where Dumbarton played friendlies against Arsenal on 13 April and Chatham two days later losing 5-1 and 3-2 respectively.

On 20 April while Dumbarton had a rest weekend, neighbours Renton aimed to follow up their success ten years earlier with a win in the Scottish Cup final against St Bernards. It would a big ask of the Second Division side and it was the capital side who walked away with the cup after a close 2–1 win.

The last game of the month saw Dumbarton entertain Vale of Leven in the semi-final of the Dumbartonshire Cup and achieved a well-earned 5–0 victory.

=== May ===
On 4 May Dumbarton travelled to Aberdeen to play a friendly against Orion and in an evenly contested match the home side won 3–2.

With the county cup final fixed for the 25th, a practice match was played against junior side Dunipace which Dumbarton won comfortably 4–1.

And so the final game of the season saw Dumbarton come up against the Scottish Cup runners up Renton for ownership of the county cup and it was Dumbarton who kept a tight grip on the trophy for the seventh year in a row with a 2–1 win.

=== June ===
The season ended on a positive note as Dumbarton retained their First Division status in the league elections on 3 June – results were as follows:

Team	Votes	Result
Dundee	14	Re-elected to First Division
Hibernian	11	Promoted from Second Division
Dumbarton	10	Re-elected to First Division
Motherwell	4	Not promoted to First Division
Leith Athletic	3	Relegated to Second Division

== Match results ==
=== Scottish League ===
18 August 1894 Scottish League	Rangers	3–0	Dumbarton	Ibrox Park
	Barker 4', 46'

1 September 1894 Scottish League	Dumbarton	3–2	Leith Athletic	Boghead Park
	Nash; Johnstone; Craig 90'		8'; Paterson

8 September 1894 Scottish League	Dundee	3–0	Dumbarton	Carolina Port
	Sawers 1' scrimmage Fleming 80'			Attendance: 5,000; Referee: J Marshall

15 September 1894 Scottish League	Dumbarton	3–4	St Bernard's	Boghead Park
	Craig; Boyle; Nash		Oswald 5', 85'; McMillan 7' (o.g.); Brady 62'	Referee: Mr Maxwell

22 September 1894 Scottish League	St Mirren	4–3	Dumbarton	Love Street (stadium)
	scrimmage Taylor; Connell		Craig; Campbell; Boyle

29 September 1894 Scottish League	Dumbarton	1–4	Hearts	Boghead Park
	Campbell 1'		Michael; Chambers; Nash (o.g.)	Attendance: 1,000; Referee: A McKenzie

13 October 1894 Scottish League	Dumbarton	2–4	Dundee	Boghead Park
	Thomson; Craig		Thomson scrimmage Fleming	Attendance: 700; Referee: Mr Cameron

20 October 1894 Scottish League	Celtic	6–0	Dumbarton	Celtic Park
	Cassidy; Madden; Blessington			Attendance: 4,000; Referee: Mr Lindsay

27 October 1894 Scottish League	Hearts	3–1	Dumbarton	Tynecastle Stadium
	Chambers; Baird		Boyle	Attendance: 5,500; Referee: Mr Kirkwood

3 November 1894 Scottish League	Dumbarton	2–3	Clyde	Boghead Park
	Craig; Campbell		Miller; Leslie

10 November 1894 Scottish League	Third Lanark	6–3	Dumbarton	Cathkin Park
	McMillan 20' (o.g.); 30' scrimmage Barber; Gardner		Thomson, W 31'; Boyle; Seaton	Referee: Mr Baillie

1 December 1894 Scottish League	Dumbarton	1–0	Rangers	Boghead Park
	Campbell			Referee: Mr Richardson

22 December 1894 Scottish League	St Bernard's	5–0	Dumbarton	New Logie Green
	Wilson; Oswald; Murdoch; Baird; Laing			Referee: J Marshall

2 March 1895 Scottish League	Dumbarton	2–4	Third Lanark	Boghead Park
	Campbell		Bell 10'; Brown	Referee: A McLean

9 March 1895 Scottish League	Dumbarton	0–2	Celtic	Boghead Park
			McMahon; Madden	Attendance: 4,000; Referee: Mr Barbour

16 March 1895 Scottish League	Clyde	3–1	Dumbarton	Barrowfield Park
	Bowie; Barnes; Leslie		Stevenson	Attendance: 1,500

30 March 1895 Scottish League	Dumbarton	4–1	St Mirren	Boghead Park
	Campbell 3'; Stevenson; Hartley; Craig		Brown	Referee: Mr McLeod

6 April 1895 Scottish League	Leith Athletic	1–1	Dumbarton	Beechwood Park (Leith)
	Goal		(o.g.)	Attendance: 1,000

=== Scottish Cup ===
24 November 1894 Cup R1	Dumbarton	2–1	Galston	Boghead Park
	Johnstone; Craig		Goal

15 December 1894 Cup R2	King's Park	2–1	Dumbarton	Forthbank Park
	McInnes scrimmage		Jackson	Referee: J Ferguson

=== Dumbartonshire Cup ===
27 April 1895 Semi-final	Dumbarton	5–0	Vale of Leven	Boghead Park
	1'; Campbell; Craig 49'			Attendance: 200

25 May 1895 Final	Dumbarton	2–1	Renton	Boghead Park
	Seaton; Campbell		Goal

=== Friendlies/Benefits ===
11 August 1894 Friendly	Ayr	1–1	Dumbarton	Somerset Park
	Colville 60'		Craig 15'

17 November 1894 Friendly	Morton	2–1	Dumbarton	Cappielow Park
	Drysdale; Joyce		(pen.)

8 December 1894 Friendly	Vale of Leven	1–3	Dumbarton	Millburn Park
	Lindsay		McIndewar 30'; Nash

31 December 1894 Friendly	Renton	1–2	Dumbarton	Tontine Park
	Price		Fraser

19 January 1895 Friendly	Dumbarton	1–1	Vale of Leven	Boghead Park
	Thomson, W		Goal	Referee: Mr McIntyre

13 April 1895 Friendly	(England) Arsenal	5–1	Dumbarton	Plumstead
	Mortimer (o.g.); Boyle; Howatt; Caldwell		Gracie	Attendance: 6,000

15 April 1895 Friendly	(England) Chatham	3–2	Dumbarton	Chatham
	Lawrence; Robertson		Stevenson; Gracie	Attendance: 3,000; Referee: Mr Saywell

4 May 1895 Friendly	Orion (Aberdeen)	3–2	Dumbarton	Cattofield
	Leggatt; Thom 46'; Stopani		Hendry; Seaton	Attendance: 2,000; Referee: P Simpson

13 May 1895 Benefit	Dunipace	1–4	Dumbarton	Dunipace
	Wright		Weir; Seaton; Campbell

== Player statistics ==
At the start of their second 'professional' season, Dumbarton were struck immediately by mass desertions not only across the border but to fellow league clubs who could afford to pay more for talented players. So before season 1894-95 has started, Dumbarton had lost the services of Billy Andrews to Bolton Wanderers, Lawrence Bell to Third Lanark, Bob Ferrier to Sheffield Wednesday, Alf Smith to Third Lanark, John Taylor to St Mirren and Albert Saunderson to Stoke.

So at the start of the season the first XI started out with a number of new faces, and coming into the team were Tom Keir (full back); Hugh Craig (right wing); William Forsyth and William Boyle (centre forwards) and James Gracie (left wing) all promoted from the second XI.

No.	Pos	Nat	Player	Total		First Division		Scottish Cup	
No.	Pos	Nat	Player	Apps	Goals	Apps	Goals	Apps	Goals
	GK	(Scotland) SCO	John McLeod	20	0	18	0	2	0
	DF	(Scotland) SCO	Tom Keir	20	0	18	0	2	0
	DF	(Scotland) SCO	Tom McMillan	10	0	10	0	0	0
	MF	(Scotland) SCO	Robert Colquhoun	2	0	1	0	1	0
	MF	(Scotland) SCO	Jimmy Hartley	8	1	7	1	1	0
	MF	(Scotland) SCO	John McNicol	3	0	3	0	0	0
	MF	(Scotland) SCO	Alex Miller	20	0	18	0	2	0
	MF	(Scotland) SCO	Billy Nash	18	2	16	2	2	0
	MF	(Scotland) SCO	Daniel Thomson	12	0	11	0	1	0
	MF	(Scotland) SCO	William Thomson	14	2	12	2	2	0
	FW	(Scotland) SCO	William Boyle	9	4	9	4	0	0
	FW	(Scotland) SCO	William Campbell	20	7	18	7	2	0
	FW	(Scotland) SCO	Hugh Craig	20	7	18	6	2	1
	FW	(Scotland) SCO	William Forsyth	3	0	3	0	0	0
	FW	(Scotland) SCO	James Gracie	10	0	10	0	0	0
	FW	(Scotland) SCO	George Jackson	3	1	2	0	1	1
	FW	(Scotland) SCO	Robert Johnstone	8	2	6	1	2	1
	FW	(Scotland) SCO	John McIndewar	3	0	2	0	1	0
	FW	(Scotland) SCO	John Seaton	4	1	4	1	0	0
	FW	(Scotland) SCO	James Stevenson	12	2	11	2	1	0
	FW	(Scotland) SCO	Hugh Weir	1	0	1	0	0	0

== Reserve team ==
Dumbarton lost in the first round of the Scottish Second XI Cup to Queen's Park.
