= 1894–95 Hibernian F.C. season =

Hibernian
1894–95 season
- Scottish Second Division: 1st
- Scottish Cup: 3rd Round
- Average home league attendance: 13,721 (down 618)

During the 1894–95 season Hibernian, a football club based in Edinburgh, finished first out of 10 clubs in the Scottish Second Division.

== Scottish Second Division ==
Match Day	Date	Opponent	H/A	Score	Hibernian Scorer(s)	Attendance
1	18 August	Partick Thistle	H	5–1		2,000
2	1 September	Abercorn	A	5–1		3,000
3	8 September	Dundee Wanderers	H	8–2		1,500
4	15 September	Airdrieonians	H	6–1		3,000
5	6 October	Motherwell	A	0–2		5,500
6	13 October	Morton	A	7–1		
7	20 October	Morton	H	6–3		
8	3 November	Abercorn	H	4–2		1,000
9	10 November	Dundee Wanderers	A	6–0		3,000
10	17 November	Renton	A	2–3		
11	22 December	Cowlairs	H	8–2		500
12	2 February	Motherwell	H	5–0		1,000
13	9 March	Port Glasgow Athletic	A	2–2		2,000
14	16 March	Cowlairs	A	8–2		1,000
15	6 April	Port Glasgow Athletic	H	3–3		
16	13 April	Partick Thistle	A	4–0		3,000
17	4 May	Renton	H	9–1		3,000
18	25 May	Airdrieonians	A	4–2		5,000

=== Final League table ===
P	Team	Pld	W	D	L	GF	GA	GD	Pts
1	Hibernian	18	14	2	2	92	28	64	30
2	Motherwell	18	10	2	6	56	39	17	22
3	Port Glasgow Athletic	18	8	4	6	62	56	6	20

=== Scottish Cup ===
Round	Date	Opponent	H/A	Score	Hibernian Scorer(s)	Attendance
R1	24 November	Forfar Athletic	H	6–1		
R2	15 December	Celtic	H	2–0		3,000
R2 R	29 December	Celtic	H	0–2		3,000

== See also ==
- List of Hibernian F.C. seasons
