= 1890–91 Celtic F.C. season =

Celtic
1890–91 season
- Stadium: Celtic Park
- Scottish Football League: 3rd
- Scottish Cup: Sixth round
- Glasgow Cup: Winners
- Scottish League Charity Competition: Runners-up

The 1890–91 season was the third season of football by Celtic.

This marked the first season where Celtic took part in the newly formed Scottish Football League, in which they placed third. They also competed in the Scottish Cup, Scottish League Charity Competition and Glasgow Cup, which they won for the first time with a 4–0 win against Third Lanark.

== Pre-season and friendlies ==
2 October 1890 Friendly	Celtic	2–2	Sunderland
15:00 GMT		Celtic Report

29 November 1890 Friendly	Royal Albert	2–2	Celtic
15:00 GMT		Celtic Report

27 December 1890 Friendly	Celtic	4–2	St. Mirren
15:00 GMT		Celtic Report

1 January 1891 Friendly	Celtic	1–1	Dumbarton
15:00 GMT		Celtic Report

17 January 1891 Friendly	Celtic	1–3	Clyde
15:00 GMT		Celtic Report

27 March 1891 Friendly	Bolton Wanderers	2–2	Celtic
15:00 GMT		Celtic Report

28 March 1891 Friendly	Ardwick	2–7	Celtic
15:00 GMT		Celtic Report

30 March 1891 Friendly	Blackburn Rovers	0–2	Celtic
15:00 GMT		Celtic Report

31 March 1891 Friendly	Sheffield Wednesday	1–3	Celtic
15:00 GMT		Celtic Report

13 April 1891 Friendly	Celtic	5–5	Blackburn Rovers
15:00 GMT		Celtic Report

18 April 1891 Friendly	Celtic	2–0	Bolton Wanderers
15:00 GMT		Celtic Report

21 April 1891 Friendly	Celtic	4–0	Preston North End
15:00 GMT		Celtic Report

9 May 1891 Friendly	Celtic	2–1	Renton
15:00 GMT		Celtic Report

21 May 1891 Friendly	Clyde	2–1	Celtic
15:00 GMT		Celtic Report

23 May 1891 Friendly	Celtic	8–1	Third Lanark
15:00 GMT		Celtic Report

== Competitions ==
=== Overview ===
==== League table ====
Pos	Team	Pld	W	D	L	GF	GA	GD	Pts	Qualification or relegation
1	Dumbarton (Note: Dumbarton and Rangers finished equal on points, and a play-off to determine the winner ended in a 2−2 draw so both teams were declared joint champions.) (C)	18	13	3	2	61	21	+40	29	Joint Champions
1	Rangers (C)	18	13	3	2	58	25	+33	29	Joint Champions
3	Celtic	18	11	3	4	48	21	+27	21 (Note: Celtic, 3rd LRV and Cowlairs were deducted four points each for fielding ineligible players.)	
4	Cambuslang	18	8	4	6	47	42	+5	20	
5	3rd LRV	18	8	3	7	38	39	−1	15	

Rules for classification: 1) Points;
(C) Champions

=== Scottish Football League ===
16 August 1890 Football League (Note: Renton were later expelled from the league and the match was voided)	Celtic	1–4	Renton	Glasgow
15:00 GMT		Celtic Report		Stadium: Celtic Park; Attendance: 8,000

23 August 1890 Football League	Heart of Midlothian	0–5	Celtic	Edinburgh
15:00 GMT		Celtic Report		Stadium: Tynecastle Park; Attendance: 5,000

30 August 1890 Football League	Celtic	5–2	Cambuslang	Glasgow
15:00 GMT		Celtic Report		Stadium: Celtic Park; Attendance: 3,500

13 September 1890 Football League	Third Lanark	2–1	Celtic	Glasgow
15:00 GMT		Celtic Report		Stadium: Cathkin Park; Attendance: 12,000

25 October 1890 Football League	Abercorn	1–5	Celtic	Abercorn
15:00 GMT		Celtic Report		Stadium: Underwood Park; Attendance: 5,000

3 January 1891 Football League	Celtic	5–1	Cowlairs	Glasgow
15:00 GMT		Celtic Report		Stadium: Celtic Park; Attendance: 4,000

24 January 1891 Football League	Vale of Leven	3–1	Celtic	Glasgow
		Celtic Report		Stadium: Millburn Park; Attendance: 4,000

7 February 1891 Football League	Celtic	3–2	St Mirren	Glasgow
		Celtic Report		Stadium: Celtic Park; Attendance: 2,000

21 February 1891 Football League	Dumbarton	2–2	Celtic	Dumbarton
15:00 GMT		Celtic Report		Stadium: Boghead Park; Attendance: 6,000

28 February 1891 Football League	Celtic	1–0	Heart of Midlothian	Glasgow
15:00 GMT		Celtic Report		Stadium: Celtic Park; Attendance: 8,000

7 March 1891 Football League	Cambuslang	3–1	Celtic	Leith
15:00 GMT		Celtic Report		Stadium: Whitefield Park; Attendance: 4,000

14 March 1891 Football League	Celtic	2–0	Cowlairs	Glasgow
15:00 GMT		Celtic Report		Stadium: Celtic Park; Attendance: 6,000

21 March 1891 Football League	Celtic	2–2	Rangers	Glasgow
15:00 GMT		Celtic Report		Stadium: Celtic Park; Attendance: 8,000

4 April 1891 Football League	St Mirren	1–0	Celtic	Paisley
15:00		Celtic Report		Stadium: Westmarch; Attendance: 5,000

11 April 1891 Football League	Celtic	1–0	Dumbarton	Glasgow
15:00 GMT		Celtic Report		Stadium: Celtic Park; Attendance: 11,000

25 April 1891 Football League	Celtic	1–1	Third Lanark	Glasgow
15:00 GMT		Celtic Report		Stadium: Celtic Park; Attendance: 6,000

29 April 1891 Football League	Cowlairs	0–5	Celtic	Glasgow
15:00		Celtic Report		Stadium: Springvale Park; Attendance: 2,500

2 May 1891 Football League	Rangers	1–2	Celtic	Glasgow
15:00 GMT		Celtic Report		Stadium: Ibrox Park; Attendance: 8,500

5 May 1891 Football League	Celtic	9–1	Vale of Leven	Glasgow
15:00 GMT		Celtic Report		Stadium: Celtic Park; Attendance: 1,800

12 May 1891 Football League	Celtic	2–0	Abercorn	Glasgow
15:00 GMT		Celtic Report		Stadium: Celtic Park; Attendance: 1,500

=== Scottish Cup ===
6 September 1890 First round	Celtic	1–0	Rangers	Glasgow
15:00 GMT		Celtic Report		Stadium: Celtic Park; Attendance: 16,000

27 September 1890 Second round	Celtic	2–2	Carfin Shamrock	Glasgow
15:00 GMT		Celtic Report		Stadium: Celtic Park

4 October 1890 Second round replay	Carfin Shamrock	1–3	Celtic	Carfin
15:00 GMT		Celtic Report		Stadium: Byreknowes Park; Attendance: 6,000

18 October 1890 Third round	Wishaw Thistle	2–6	Celtic	Wishaw
15:00 GMT		Celtic Report		Stadium: Celtic Park; Attendance: 4,000

8 November 1890 Fourth round	Dundee Our Boys	1–3	Celtic	Dundee
15:00 GMT		Celtic Report		Stadium: West Craigie Park

6 December 1890 Fifth round	Royal Albert	0–4 (Note: Match stopped 12 minutes from time)	Celtic	Larkhall
15:00 GMT		Celtic Report		Stadium: Raploch Park; Attendance: 2,000

13 December 1890 Fifth round replay	Celtic	2–0	Royal Albert	Glasgow
15:00 GMT		Celtic Report		Stadium: Ibrox Park; Attendance: 2,000

20 December 1890 QF	Dumbarton	3–0	Celtic	Dumbarton
15:00 GMT		Celtic Report		Stadium: Boghead Park

=== Glasgow Cup ===
20 September 1890 Glasgow Cup	Celtic	7–1	Battlefield
15:00 GMT		Celtic Report

11 October 1890 Glasgow Cup	Northern	1–2	Celtic
15:00 GMT		Celtic Report

1 November 1890 Glasgow Cup	Celtic	5–0	Clyde
15:00 GMT		Celtic Report

22 November 1890 Glasgow Cup	Celtic	5–1	Partick Thistle
15:00 GMT		Celtic Report

14 February 1891 Glasgow Cup	Celtic	4–0	Third Lanark
15:00 GMT		Celtic Report

=== Scottish League Charity Competition ===
30 May 1891	Celtic	6–1	Third Lanark
15:00 GMT		Celtic Report

10 June 1891 Final	Celtic	0–3	Dumbarton
15:00 GMT		Celtic Report
