= Harp F.C. (1894) =

Former association football club in Scotland

Harp
- Full name: Harp Football Club
- Nicknames: the Hibs, the Greens
- Founded: 1894
- Dissolved: 1897
- Ground: West Craigie Park/East Dock Street
- Secretary: C. Mulholland
Home colours

Harp Football Club, founded as Hibernian Football Club, was a Scottish association football club, founded in Dundee in 1894.

== History ==
=== Hibernian ===
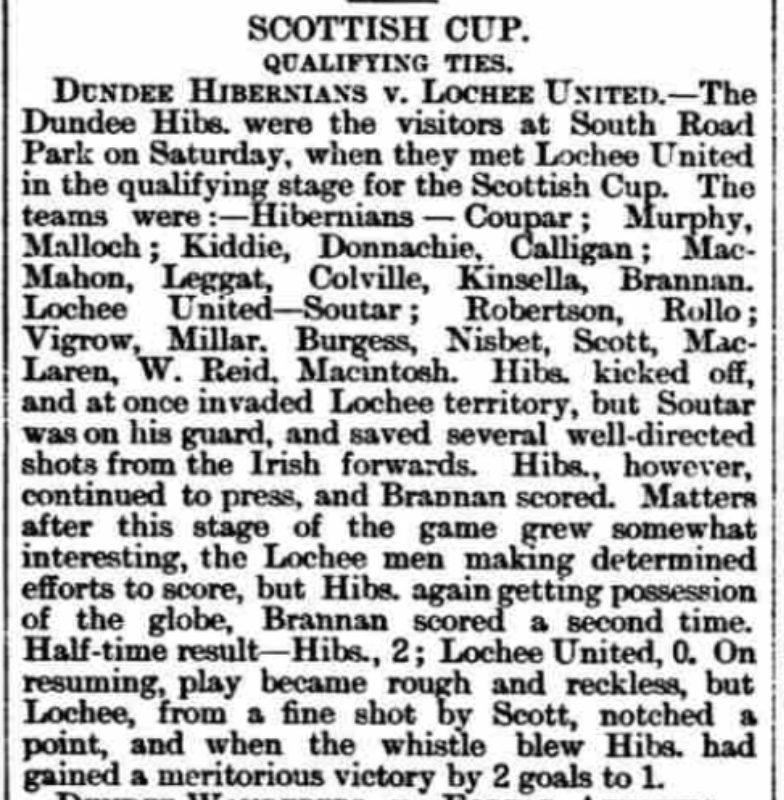
The club's only competitive win, 2–1 at Lochee United in the 1895–96 Qualifying Cup, Dundee Courier, 2 September 1895

The Tayside club had been founded out of the insolvency of Harp at the end of the 1893–94 season. By the end of August 1894, the new Hibernian club had been founded, made up largely of former Harp players. The club's name as registered was simply Hibernian, the club being called Hibernians (Dundee) or Dundee Hibernians when confusion with the Edinburgh club was likely.

The club's first match was a 3–1 defeat at Arbroath in September 1894, but considered a promising start. It made its competitive debut in the Forfarshire Cup the following month, losing 4–3 at home to Arbroath Wanderers at West Craigie Park, but an early indication of concern was a crowd numbering merely 50. Even worse, the Hibs had paid the Wanderers £4 for the right to host the tie, instantly leaving the Hibs £3 out of pocket even before expenses; and although a protest about the match ending early saw the Forfarshire FA order a replay, the Wanderers beat the Hibs 7–1.

=== Harp ===
At the start of the 1895–96 season, the club joined the Scottish Football Association, and asked permission to change its name to Harp, "as they could not live under" the Hibernian name; the club had already played one match under the Harp name. Some confusion led to the belief that this Harp was a new club, although its players were those of the Hibernian the previous season, and, as the Scottish FA initially denied permission, the Harp had to remain as Hibernian for the time being.

On 17 September 1895 the Scottish FA relented, on the basis that there was no direct legal connection with the old Harp. By this time, the club had already been knocked out of the Scottish Qualifying Cup, having lost in the second round to St Johnstone, not helped by a mix of losing players to the English game and the refusal of the more well-off Irish citizens in town to support the new club.

The club made its competitive bow under its new name in a Forfarshire Cup tie against Arbroath, in an increasingly contentious tie which took 5 attempts to resolve. The first attempt was turned into a friendly due to the "lake-like" state of East Dock Park, a 4–2 win for Harp was overturned on the basis that Fagan was ineligible to play, a 4–2 win for Arbroath was overturned on the basis that the match ended 7 minutes early through darkness, and a 1–1 draw at East Dock Street were all played at East Dock Street, before Arbroath put the matter beyond doubt, with a 6–0 win at Gayfield, the Harp's consolation being a share in a gate of 2,500.

The Harp played in the season-closing Dundee Charity Shield, beating Lochee United in the semi-final, and was due to play Dundee in the final. However Dundee refused to take part, so Harp offered to play the Wanderers rather than accept the trophy by default. The Wanderers took full advantage, beating the Harp 5–1.

Alas for the Harp its generosity was not matched by its landlord. Its tenancy expired on 3 June 1896, and the club was temporarily disbanded, losing its Scottish FA membership, and not being able to pursue a proposed application to join the Northern League.

However the club committee revived the club in late August, albeit with an entirely different set of players, and secured East Dock Street Park once more; the club was re-admitted to the Scottish FA in time to play in the second round of the Qualifying Cup. The club lost 3–1 to Forfar Athletic, ominously in front of a poor attendance.

The club struggled through the season, at one point going on a long hiatus after a disastrous journey to Arbroath for the Forfarshire Cup tie - only four players and three officials turned up to Gayfield, seven players having abandoned the journey at Broughty Ferry after an argument, leading to an impromptu friendly instead and demands from the Arbroath public for a return of their threepences.

Harp finally applied in June 1897 to join the Northern League, but lost the vote to the two clubs seeking re-election; it was the death knell for the club. Evicted once more from East Dock Street at the end of the season, the club committee wrote to the Scottish FA stating that it was unable to obtain a private ground, and asked to be let out of the ties for a season; in fact the Harp was never revived.

== Colours ==
The club wore green shirts and white knickers.

== Ground ==
The club originally played at West Craigie Park, shared with the Wanderers at the time. In August 1895 the club moved to the old Harp's former ground of East Dock Street.
