= James Galbraith =

James Galbraith may refer to:

- Sir James Galbraith, 1st Baronet (c. 1759–1827), Irish politician
- James Galbraith (British Army officer) (1833–1880), Irish officer in the British Army
- James Galbraith (British politician) (1872–1945), British Conservative politician, MP for East Surrey
- James Ponsonby Galbraith, Lord Lieutenant of Tyrone
- James Galbraith (Canadian politician) (born 1940), Canadian politician
- James K. Galbraith (born 1952), American economist and writer
- James Galbraith (footballer), Scottish footballer
