= Dundee Harp F.C. =

Former association football club in Scotland

Dundee Harp
- Full name: Dundee Harp Football Club
- Founded: 1879
- Dissolved: 1894
- Ground: Magdalen Green, Dundee; Tayside Park, Dundee; Viewforth Park, Dundee; East Dock Street, Dundee
Home colours

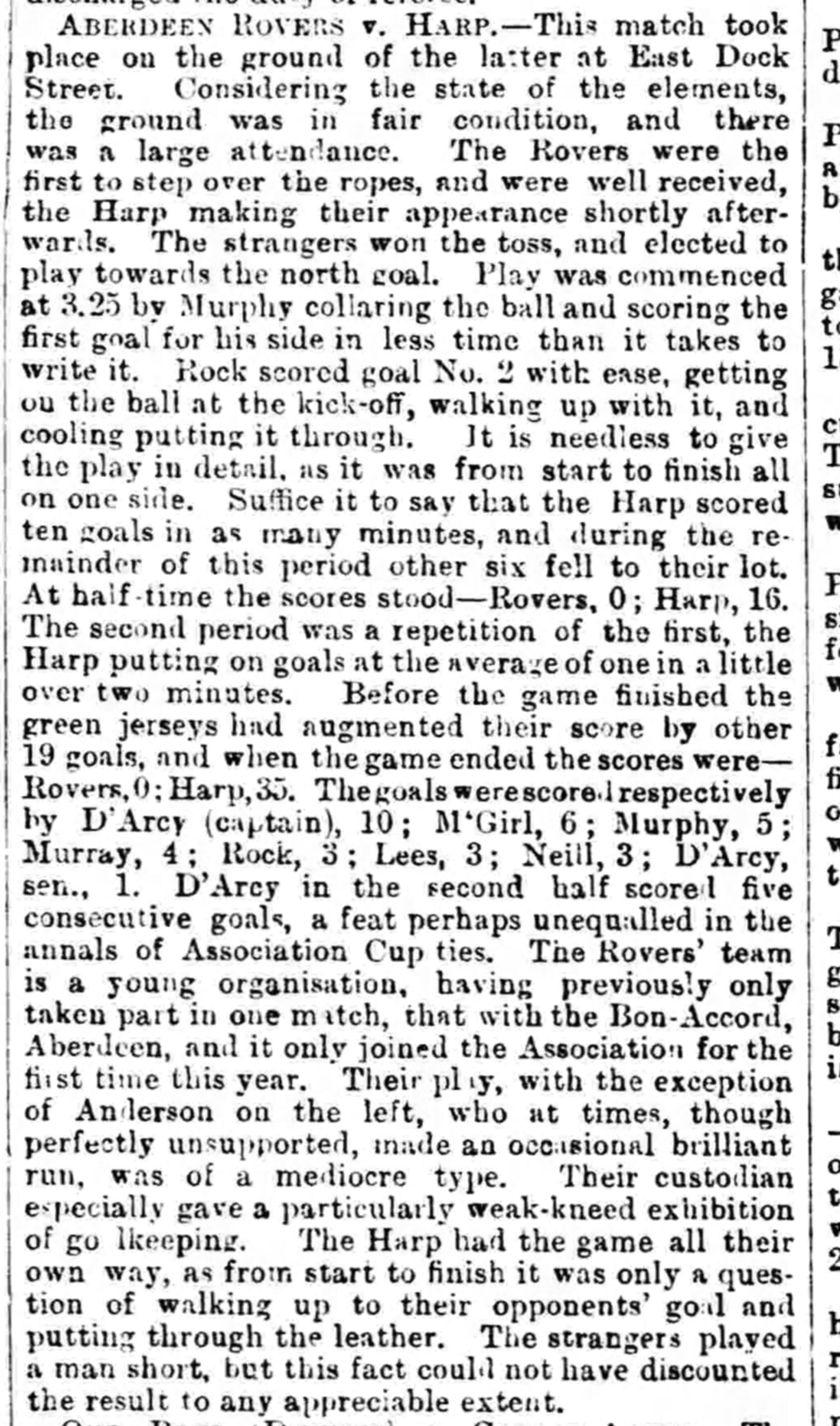
Match report for Dundee Harp 35-0 Aberdeen Rovers, The Courier and Argus, 15 September 1885

Dundee Harp Football Club was a football club based in Dundee, Scotland. Founded in 1879, the team went out of business in 1894.

== History ==
Dundee Harp was founded to provide a focus of sporting interest for the city's large Roman Catholic community, largely of Irish descent, following the example of the leaders of the same community in Edinburgh who founded Hibernian in 1875 along the same principles. The club's ground was located near the gas works in East Dock Street. The club did not compete in a national league, mostly playing in local and regional competitions in the East of Scotland.

=== 35–0 win over Aberdeen Rovers ===
Harp's most notable result was a 35–0 victory against Aberdeen Rovers F.C. in a game played on 12 September 1885. Remarkably, this occurred on the same day that Arbroath beat Bon Accord 36–0, the largest margin of victory in senior football history.

There is a story that the referee in the Harp-Aberdeen Rovers game had noted 37 goals, Harp's secretary suggested a miscount must have occurred as he had recorded only 35. The match official, acknowledging that it was difficult for him to keep accurate details during such a deluge of goals, accepted the lower tally and wired the official score of 35–0 to SFA headquarters. However the contemporary reports mention 35 goals and apportion them between scorers.

Dundee Harp full back Tom O'Kane was an ex-Arbroath player, and persuaded the Dundee club's officials to send a telegram to his former colleagues at Gayfield Park boasting of his team's record breaking achievement. The Harp players and officials were not to know that Arbroath had actually gone one better against another unfortunate Aberdeen side on that same afternoon. On receiving the Harp telegram, Arbroath officials took great delight in sending a reply boasting of the Angus side's superior achievement. It was only when O'Kane arrived back in Arbroath on the late Saturday evening train that he discovered the truth. Locals were quick to tell him that the Arbroath result was no joke and Harp's record-breaking claim was about to be lost.

=== 1886–87 Scottish Cup run ===
The following season saw the club's best run in the Scottish Cup, reaching the fifth round stage, which in 1886–87 was made up of the last 16. The club was drawn to face eventual winners Dumbarton at the latter's Boghead ground. However Dumbarton instead came to Dundee, as Harp could not afford to travel to Dumbarton, given the expense of travel from the east coast to the west. The Harp twice fell behind and twice equalized - albeit Dumbarton protested both goals, the first on the basis that the Harp had claimed a free-kick but played on, the second on the basis that the Harp attempt to bundle goalkeeper M'Aulay behind the line had not succeeded - to draw 2–2. Even so, managing a draw against the Sons of the Rock was "to the surprise of many".

However, despite the tie being advertised as a Cup tie, it transpired after the match that the Harp had actually conceded the tie to Dumbarton, and had attracted Dumbarton to visit Dundee as a friendly match, rather than as a Cup tie. The Dumbarton club was unaware that the Harp sold the match as a Cup tie and the Dumbartonshire media reported the match as a friendly. The consequence of this was that the entire Harp executive was unanimously voted out at the end of the year. Even worse, Harp was so cash-strapped that it could not pay the £18 appearance guarantee to Dumbarton.

=== Death of the club ===
Dundee Harp was suspended by the SFA in 1894 for inability to pay match guarantees to visiting clubs and Harp then disappeared from the scene. In order to help the club members pay debts for which they had become personally liable, the Dundee Charity Committee held a match at Clepington Park between Dundee and a "select" XI made up of players from Dundonians and Lochee United.

By the end of August 1894, a new club, Hibernian, had been founded, made up largely of former Harp players. This club had no connection to the club of the same name that was founded in 1909 and became Dundee United in 1923. This Dundee Hibernian changed its name to Dundee Harp in 1896, but the following year the club went out of business, weighed down by debts which it could not meet. Although a club named Harp F.C. was founded in the Lochee district of Dundee in 1904, this was a junior club (the equivalent of a non-league club in England), the level at which it still plays today, under the name Lochee Harp.

== Colours ==
The club played in green shirts until 1892, changing to green and white "striped jerseys" by 1893.

== Grounds ==
The club played at Magdalen Green from 1879 until moving to Tayside Park in 1881. In 1883 they moved to Viewforth Park, but moved again the following year to East Dock Street, also known as the Harp Athletic Grounds.

== Honours ==
Forfarshire Cup

- 1884–85, 1885–86, 1886–87

Burns Charity Cup

- 1883–84, 1884–85, 1885–86
