= Daniel Watson (footballer) =

Scottish footballer

Personal information
- Full name: Daniel Watson

Senior career*
Years	Team	Apps	(Gls)
1888–1889	Dumbarton Athletic		
1890–1892	Dumbarton	24	(0)
- * Club domestic league appearances and goals

Daniel Watson was a Scottish professional footballer who played in the 1880s and 1890s.

== Career ==
Watson played club football in Scotland and began his career with Dumbarton Athletic. In the following season, Dumbarton Athletic were to merge with their more successful neighbour, Dumbarton and Watson was one of the few 'Athletic' players who were to step straight into the Dumbarton side.

== Honours ==
Dumbarton

- Scottish League: Champions 1890–1891;1891–92
- Scottish Cup: Runners Up 1890-91
- Dumbartonshire Cup: Winners 1888–89;1889–1890;1890–1891
- League Charity Cup: Winners 1890–91
- 1 representative cap for Dumbartonshire in 1890.
