= Hugh Mair =

Scottish footballer

Personal information
- Full name: Hugh Mair
- Position: Forward

Senior career*
Years	Team	Apps	(Gls)
1887–1897	Dumbarton	11	(4)
- * Club domestic league appearances and goals

Hugh Mair was a Scottish footballer who played in the 1880s and 1890s.

== Career ==
Mair played club football in Scotland, joining Dumbarton where he was to spend the best part of ten seasons.

== Honours ==
Dumbarton

- Scottish League: Champions 1890-1891
- Scottish Cup: Runners Up 1890-1891
- Dumbartonshire Cup: Winners 1888–89;1889-1890;1890-1891
- League Charity Cup; Winners 1890-91
- 1 representative cap for Dumbartonshire in 1890.
