= Percy Hislop =

Scottish footballer

Personal information
- Date of birth: 12 September 1870
- Place of birth: Glasgow, Scotland
- Date of death: 1929 (aged 58–59)
- Position: Forward

Senior career*
Years	Team	Apps	(Gls)
–	Glasgow Royal		
–	Westburn		
1888–1890	Partick Thistle		
1890–1891	Rangers	18	(9)
1891–1892	Aston Villa	7	(3)
- Forfar Athletic
- * Club domestic league appearances and goals

Percy Hislop, also known as David Hislop (12 September 1870 – 1929) (Note: It is not clear at present why Hislop appears to have been known as David in Scotland and Percy in England, nor his precise personal details; archive checks have uncovered no Percy Hislop born around 1870 or died around 1929 in Scotland, nor any David Hislop or David Percy of those dates who offer any obvious connection. There are press reports which confirm the same man played for Rangers then Aston Villa. The reasons for his apparent rapid fall from prominence (playing regularly at leading clubs a few months before being reported with a small club in the north-east of Scotland) is equally unclear – possibly due to injury but no contemporary press reports have been found to clarify this.) was a Scottish footballer who played as a forward in the Football League for Aston Villa.

He had earlier played in Scotland for Partick Thistle and Rangers, making an important contribution to the Govan club's first national championship in the inaugural 1890–91 Scottish Football League, playing in all of the 18 regular fixtures and scoring in the play-off against Dumbarton, a 2–2 draw which resulted in the title being shared between the clubs.

Hislop moved to England shortly afterwards and made his Aston Villa debut on 5 September 1891 in a 5-1 home victory over Blackburn Rovers. Having scored on his debut and been a regular member of the starting line-up for Villa at the start of the 1891–92 Football League season, he did not play for them again after October 1891, and the following year returned north with non-league Forfar Athletic.
