= Springvale Park =

Former football ground in Glasgow, Scotland

- Location within Glasgow council area
- Location: Cowlairs, Glasgow, Scotland
- Coordinates: 55.8830°N 4.2367°W
- Record attendance: 6,000
- Surface: Grass
- Opened: 1890
- Closed: 1895

Tenants
- Cowlairs (1890–1895)

Springvale Park was a football ground in the Cowlairs area of Glasgow, Scotland. It was the home ground of Cowlairs F.C. during their time in the Scottish Football League.

== History ==
The ground was opened in 1890 when Cowlairs moved from Gourlay Park prior to the start of the first Scottish Football League season. It was located on Cowlairs Road to the east of the Cowlairs railway works. The first league game at the stadium was played on 23 August 1890, with Cowlairs beating Vale of Leven 3–2. The highest league attendance at the ground was probably the 2,500 who watched Cowlairs lose 5–0 to Celtic on 29 April 1891, with the likely record attendance being 6,000 for a Glasgow Cup semi-final game against Celtic on 27 October 1894. By then the stadium had an open seated stand on the northern side of the pitch, a pavilion complex in the south-eastern corner, and a running track that was added in 1893.

At the end of the 1894–95 season Cowlairs failed to be re-elected to the Scottish League. After leaving the league, they returned to Goulay Park. The last league match at Springvale Park was played on 27 April 1895, with Cowlairs beating Dundee Wanderers 2–1.

The site was later used to expand the surrounding railway sidings and for a railway chord allowing direct services between Glasgow Queen Street and Springburn.
