= 1891–92 Aston Villa F.C. season =

English football club season

Aston Villa
1891–92 season
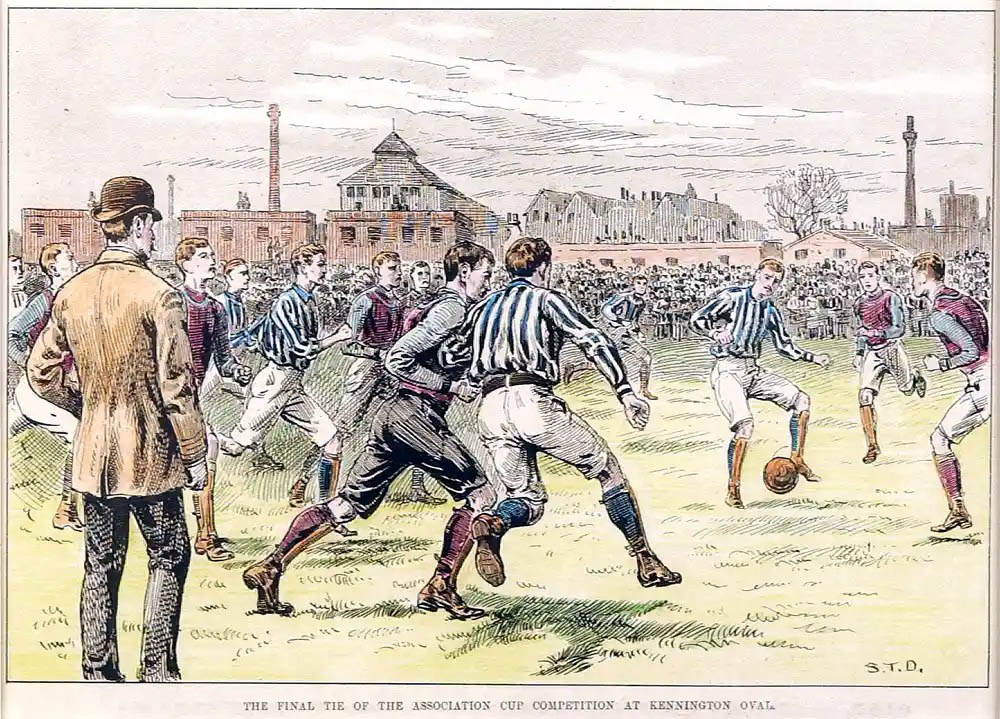
- 1892 FA Cup Final by Stephen Dadd
- President: James Hinks
- Manager: George Ramsay
- Ground: Wellington Road
- Football League: 4th
- FA Cup: Runners-up (1)
Home colours	Away colours

The Football League
- Season: 1891–92
- Champions: Sunderland (1st English title)
- Relegated: Darwen
- Top goalscorer: John Campbell (Sunderland), 32
- Highest scoring: Aston Villa – Accrington 12–2 (12 March 1892)

The 1890–91 English football season was Aston Villa's fourth season in the Football League. Aston Villa (Villa) made a strong start to the season, winning their first four games and scoring sixteen goals. They eventually finished fourth in The Football League and set a club record for goals scored in a league match while defeating Accrington 12-2. Aston Villa did not draw a single match during the season. The campaign was part of a relatively dominant period in Aston Villa's history: footballers such as James Cowan, Charlie Athersmith and John Devey are noted for their contributions during this season and the following years. In addition the eventual captain Jack Devey debuted this year.

It was the FA Cup, however, which retained the most excitement for supporters. Villa defeated Heanor Town F.C., Darwen, local rivals Wolverhampton Wanderers F.C. and Sunderland to reach their second FA Cup final, which was played at The Oval at that time. Villa were matched against their Warwickshire rivals West Bromwich Albion F.C., as they were in 1887 FA Cup Final, where Aston Villa won 2-0. Villa were viewed as strong favourites in 1892, as they had already beaten Albion home and away in the league; in the end, they were defeated 3-0. After the match, rumours circulated that goalkeeper Jimmy Warner had thrown the match. He would be transferred to Newton Heath F.C. following the controversy, which included accusations that he had thrown the match to resolve gambling debts.

This was the first season in which the penalty kick was introduced into the game. Initially the penalty could be taken from anywhere along the "12-yard line". The penalty spot was not invented until 1902. As late as 1901, in the warm weather months, Villa would forgo their heavier woollen club colours in favour of thin cotton red shirts.

== First Division ==
Pos	Team	Pld	W	D	L	GF	GA	GAv	Pts
2	Preston North End	26	18	1	7	61	31	1.968	37
3	Bolton Wanderers	26	17	2	7	51	37	1.378	36
4	Aston Villa	26	15	0	11	89	56	1.589	30
5	Everton	26	12	4	10	49	49	1.000	28
6	Wolverhampton Wanderers	26	11	4	11	59	46	1.283	26

=== Matches ===
5 September 1891	Aston Villa	5–1	Blackburn Rovers	Wellington Road
	Percy Hislop; Jack Devey; Billy Dickson; Charlie Athersmith	Report
Note: Percy Hislop scores on his debut.

12 September 1891	Aston Villa	5–1	West Bromwich Albion	Wellington Road
	Charlie Athersmith; Jack Devey; Percy Hislop; Billy Dickson	Report

19 September 1891	Preston North End	0–1	Aston Villa	Deepdale
		Report	Percy Hislop

28 September 1891	Aston Villa	5–3	Sunderland	Wellington Road
	James Brown; Dennis Hodgetts; Billy Dickson; Jack Devey; Charlie Athersmith	Report

3 October 1891	Derby County	4–2	Aston Villa	Racecourse Ground
	Billy Dickson (2)	Report

10 October 1891	Aston Villa	1–2	Bolton Wanderers	Wellington Road
	Percy Hislop	Report

17 October 1891	Burnley	4–1	Aston Villa	Turf Moor
		Report	Billy Dickson

24 October 1891	Stoke	2–3	Aston Villa	Victoria Ground
		Report	Lewis Campbell; Jack Devey; Billy Dickson

31 October 1891	Darwen	1–5	Aston Villa	Barley Bank
		Report	Lewis Campbell (2); Charlie Hare (2); Jack Devey

7 November 1891	Aston Villa	5–1	Notts County	Wellington Road
	Jack Devey; Dennis Hodgetts; Lewis Campbell; Charlie Hare; Charlie Athersmith	Report

14 November 1891	West Bromwich Albion	0–3	Aston Villa	Stoney Lane
	Jack Devey; Lewis Campbell; Charlie Hare	Report

21 November 1891	Aston Villa	2–1	Stoke	Wellington Road
	Lewis Campbell; Charlie Athersmith	Report

28 November 1891	Everton	5–1	Aston Villa	Anfield
		Report	Dennis Hodgetts

5 December 1891	Aston Villa	6–1	Burnley	Wellington Road
	Jack Devey; Billy Dickson; James Brown	Report

19 December 1891	Wolverhampton Wanderers	2–0	Aston Villa	Molineux
		Report

26 December 1891	Aston Villa	7–0	Darwen	Wellington Road
	Dennis Hodgetts; Lewis Campbell; Charlie Athersmith; Jack Devey	Report

28 December 1891	Aston Villa	3–4	Everton	Wellington Road
	Jack Devey; Dennis Hodgetts	Report

2 January 1892	Notts County	5–2	Aston Villa	Trent Bridge
		Report	Charlie Athersmith; Jack Devey

4 January 1892	Accrington	3–2	Aston Villa	Thorneyholme Road
		Report	Charlie Athersmith; Jack Devey

9 January 1892	Aston Villa	6–0	Derby County	Wellington Road
	Jack Devey; Billy Dickson; Dennis Hodgetts; Lewis Campbell; Charlie Athersmith	Report

5 March 1892	Blackburn Rovers	4–3	Aston Villa	Ewood Park
		Report	Lewis Campbell; Billy Dickson

12 March 1892	Aston Villa	12–2	Accrington	Wellington Road
	Dennis Hodgetts; Jack Devey (5); Billy Dickson (3); Lewis Campbell (3)	Report

26 March 1892	Sunderland	2–1	Aston Villa	Newcastle Road
		Report	Jack Devey

2 April 1892	Bolton Wanderers	1–2	Aston Villa	Pike's Lane
		Report	Jack Devey; Billy Dickson

16 April 1892	Aston Villa	3–1	Preston North End	Wellington Road
	Billy Dickson (2); Jack Devey	Report

18 April 1892	Aston Villa	3–6	Wolverhampton Wanderers	Wellington Road
	Dennis Hodgetts; Billy Dickson; Jack Devey	Report

Source: avfchistory.co.uk

== FA Cup ==
16 January 1892 1st Round	Aston Villa	4–1	Heanor Town

30 January 1892 2nd Round	Aston Villa	2–0	Darwen

13 February 1892 3rd Round	Wolves	1–3	Aston Villa

1892 Semi-Final	Sunderland	1–4	Aston Villa	Sheffield

19 March 1892 Final	West Brom	0–3	Aston Villa	Kennington Oval
				Attendance: 32,710; Referee: Charles Clegg
Note: A Warm, Sunny and cloudless day.
