= 1894–95 Scottish Division Two =

Scottish Division Two
- Season: 1894–95
- Champions: Hibernian
- Promoted: Hibernian

The 1894–95 Scottish Division Two was won by Hibernian, with Cowlairs finishing bottom.

== Table ==
Pos	Team	Pld	W	D	L	GF	GA	GD	Pts	Promotion or relegation
1	Hibernian (C, P)	18	14	2	2	92	28	+64	30	Promoted to the 1895–96 Scottish First Division
2	Motherwell	18	10	2	6	56	39	+17	22	
3	Port Glasgow Athletic	18	8	4	6	62	56	+6	20	
3	Renton	17	10	0	7	46	44	+2	20	
5	Morton	18	9	1	8	59	63	−4	19	
6	Abercorn	18	7	4	7	51	65	−14	18	
6	Airdrieonians	18	8	2	8	68	45	+23	18	
8	Partick Thistle	18	7	3	8	50	62	−12	17	
9	Dundee Wanderers (R)	17	3	1	13	44	86	−42	9 (Note: Renton failed to turn up for a fixture against Dundee Wanderers. Two points were awarded to Dundee Wanderers.)	Resigned (Note: Both Dundee Wanderers and Cowlairs resigned from the league at the end of the season.)
10	Cowlairs (R)	18	2	3	13	37	77	−40	7	Resigned

Source: statto.com
Rules for classification: Teams finish equal if level on points. Points system: 2 points for a win, 1 point for a draw, 0 points for a loss
(C) Champions; (P) Promoted; (R) Relegated
