= James Galbraith (British Army officer) =

British army officer

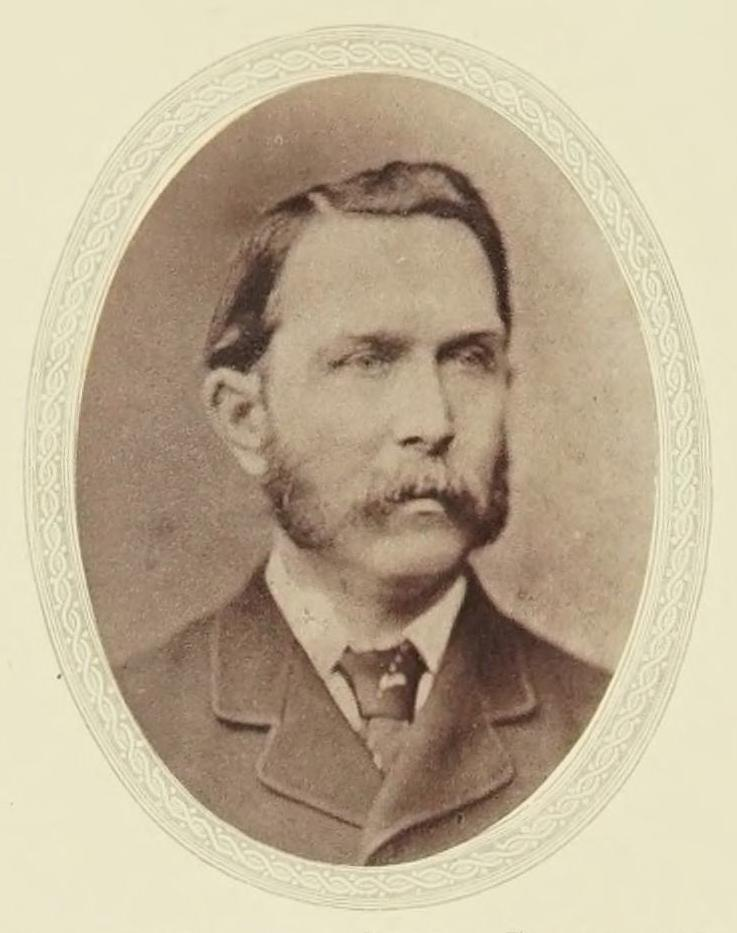
- Photographic portrait printed in Sydney H. Shadbolt's The Afghan Campaigns of 1878–1880 (1882)
- Born: 1833; Ireland
- Died: 27 July 1880 (aged 46–47); Maiwand, Afghanistan
- Military career
- Allegiance: United Kingdom
- Branch: British Army
- Service years: 1851–1880
- Rank: Lieutenant-Colonel
- Commands: 66th (Berkshire) Regiment
- Conflicts: Second Anglo-Afghan War; Battle of Maiwand †

James Galbraith (1833 – 27 July 1880) was an Irish officer in the British Army. He served in the 66th (Berkshire) Regiment of Foot, being stationed in numerous British colonies. He participated in the Second Anglo-Afghan War. There he fought in the Battle of Maiwand where he was killed in action.

== Life ==
=== Origins ===
James Galbraith was born in 1833, the fifth son of Samuel Galbraith, Esq., of Clanabogan, in the County of Tyrone, Ireland, and of Susannah Jane, his wife, daughter of the Rev. Robert Handcock, D.D., of Dublin and of Lacken, County Roscommon, and granddaughter of William Handcock, Esq., for many years MP for Athlone. In Burkes' Landed Gentry the Galbraiths of Clanabogan are stated to have been of Scotch descent, and to have settled in Ulster in the reign of Charles I.

Educated at home, James Galbraith passed his examination at Sandhurst for a commission in the Army, and was gazetted in December 1851, to an Ensigncy by purchase, in the 66th Regiment, with which corps to the last his life was identified. He proceeded, on appointment, to the Depôt, then stationed in Guernsey; and after serving there for some eighteen months embarked for Canada to join the headquarters. While in that country he was promoted (June 1854) to a lieutenancy. The regiment was ordered home in the autumn of the same year, and a few months after its arrival in England was sent to Gibraltar. In the spring of 1855 Galbraith was sent home to the Depôt (which had been transferred to Leeds), to act as paymaster and quartermaster. In February 1856 he obtained his company, by purchase.

=== India ===
Captain Galbraith sailed for the East Indies in the year 1857, with two companies of the regiment, under the command of Major Benson, in HMS Gloriana, and joined the Headquarters at Cannanor, where the 66th was stationed for over four years. For some part of this period he commanded a detachment at Calicut. Returning to England with the regiment for its term of home service, he did duty with it at Devonport, Aldershot, Guernsey, Jersey, the Curragh, and Dublin, and obtained while stationed in Ireland (August 1869) his Majority.

On the regiment being ordered a second time to India, in 1870, Major Galbraith commanded a wing, during the voyage out, in one of Her Majesty's troop-ships; and three companies while stationed at Haidarabad, Sind. He subsequently commanded the regiment at Belgaum during parts of the years 1874 and 1875, and again at Haidarabad from the spring of 1879 till he succeeded to the permanent command at Karachi, in November 1879. In the interval (October 1877) he obtained his Brevet Lieutenant-Colonelcy.

=== Afghanistan ===
In February 1880, the 66th was ordered to Kandahar, and arrived there under his command on 25 March 1880, four days before the departure of the Bengal troops for Kabul under command of Sir Donald Stewart. Colonel Galbraith commanded the regiment on the 14 July, when the mutineers of the Wali's army were defeated near Girishk and his guns retaken.

It was on 27 July 1880, on the fatal field of Maiwand, that Galbraith fell, fighting manfully against the overwhelming numbers of Ayub Khan's followers. "He was last seen", wrote General Primrose in his despatch, "on the nullah bank, kneeling on one knee, with a colour in his hand, officers and men rallying round him". When the battle-field was revisited by the force under command of Brigadier-General Daubeny, in September, his body, and that of his old friend Captain McMath, were found together, with those of many of their comrades.

=== Legacy ===
Colonel Galbraith was unmarried. He was a large landed proprietor in County Galway, and a magistrate, and had been High Sheriff of that county.

== Bibliography ==
- Hanna, Henry Bathurst (1910). The Second Afghan War 1878–79–80: Its Causes, Its Conduct, and Its Consequences. Vol. 3. London: Constable & Co. Ltd. pp. 390, 409, 416, 429.
- Robson, Brian (1986). The Road to Kabul: The Second Afghan War 1878–1881. Arms and Armour Press. p. 262.
- Shadbolt, Sydney H. (1882). The Afghan Campaigns of 1878–1880. Vol. 1: Biographical Division. London: Sampson Low, Marston Searle, and Rivington. pp. 53, 63, 84–85.
- Stacpoole-Ryding, Richard J.; Chaloner, Andy (2008). Maiwand: The Last Stand of the 66th (Berkshire) Regiment in Afghanistan, 1880. History Press.
- "General Order. Military Department. Simla, the 27th September, 1880". The London Gazette. No. 24903. 19 November 1880. pp. 5799–5824.
- "Officers Killed at Maiwand". The Illustrated London News. No. 2163. Vol. LXXVII. 13 November 1880. p. 468.
