= East Dock Street =

Football ground in Dundee, Scotland

- Location within Dundee City council area
- Location: Dundee, Scotland
- Coordinates: 56.4658°N 2.9491°W
- Surface: Grass
- Record attendance: 5,000

Tenants
- Dundee Harp (1884–1894); Dundee Wanderers (1894)

East Dock Street, also known as the Harp Athletic Grounds, was a football ground in Dundee, Scotland. It was the home ground of Dundee Harp, and was used by Dundee Wanderers at the start of the 1894–95 season.

== History ==
The ground was home to Dundee Harp between 1884 and 1894, and the venue of their 35–0 win over Aberdeen Rovers on 12 September 1885 in the first round of the Scottish Cup. It was used to host the final of the Forfarshire Cup in 1887, 1889, 1890, 1891 and 1896, with the 5,000 spectators at the 1887 final possibly being the ground's record attendance.

When the newly formed Dundee Wanderers were elected to Division Two of the Scottish Football League in 1894, they began the 1894–95 season playing their home matches at East Dock Street rather than their Clepington Park ground. The first match was a 2–2 draw with Motherwell on 25 August 1894, and following matches against Port Glasgow Athletic on 15 September (a 9–0 win) and Airdrieonians on 20 October (a 2–1 defeat), Wanderers' final league match at the ground was on 10 November, a 6–0 defeat to Hibernian. The club then moved back to Clepington Park for the remainder of the season. The site is now part of an industrial estate.
