= John Seaton (footballer) =

Scottish footballer

Personal information
- Full name: John Seaton
- Date of birth: 1862
- Date of death: September 1910 (aged 47–48)

Senior career*
Years	Team	Apps	(Gls)
1894–97	Dumbarton	14	(1)
	Clyde	?	(?)
- * Club domestic league appearances and goals

John Seaton (1862 – September 1910) was a Scottish footballer who played for Dumbarton and Clyde.

== Honours ==
Dumbarton

- Dumbartonshire Cup: Runners Up 1895–96
