= Thomas McMillan (footballer) =

Scottish footballer

Personal information
- Full name: Thomas McMillan
- Date of birth: 11 October 1864
- Place of birth: Mauchline, Scotland
- Date of death: 2 January 1928 (aged 63)
- Place of death: Dumbarton, Scotland
- Positions: Right half; right back

Youth career
- Mauchline

Senior career*
Years	Team	Apps	(Gls)
1884–1885	Dumbarton Athletic		
1885–1895	Dumbarton	71	(4)
1888	→ Rutherglen (loan)		

International career
1887	Scotland	1	(0)
1894	Scottish League XI	1	(0)
- * Club domestic league appearances and goals

Thomas McMillan (11 October 1864 – 2 January 1928) was a Scottish footballer.

== Career ==
McMillan played for Mauchline, Dumbarton Athletic, Dumbarton and Scotland.

== Honours ==
Dumbarton

- Scottish Football League: 1890–91, 1891–1892
- Scottish Cup: Runner-up 1887, 1891
- Dumbartonshire Cup: 1888–89, 1889–90, 1890–91, 1892–93, 1893–94
- League Charity Cup: 1891
- Greenock Charity Cup: 1890; Runner-up 1889
- 1 cap for Scotland in 1887
- 1 cap for the Scottish League in 1894
- 11 representative caps for Dumbartonshire between 1885 and 1893, scoring 3 goals
- 1 international trial match for Scotland in 1892.
