= James Galbraith (footballer) =

Scottish footballer

Personal information
- Place of birth: Dumbarton, Scotland
- Position: Inside right

Senior career*
Years	Team	Apps	(Gls)
1888–1889	Dumbarton Athletic		
1890–1892	Dumbarton	24	(7)
- * Club domestic league appearances and goals

James Galbraith was a Scottish footballer who played in the early 1890s.

== Career ==
Galbraith played club football in Scotland and began his career with Dumbarton Athletic. In the following season, Dumbarton Athletic were to merge with their more successful neighbour, Dumbarton and Galbraith was one of the few 'Athletic' players who were to make it straight into the Dumbarton side.

== Honours ==
Dumbarton

- Scottish League: Champions 1890–91, 1891–92
- Scottish Cup: Runners Up 1890–91
- Dumbartonshire Cup: Winners 1889–90
- League Charity Cup: Winners 1890–91
- Greenock Charity Cup: Winners 1889–90, 1890–91; Runners Up 1891–92
- Two representative caps for Dumbartonshire between 1889 and 1890.
