= 1890–91 Scottish Football League =

Scottish Football League
- Season: 1890–91
- Dates: 16 August 1890 – 21 May 1891
- Champions: Dumbarton and Rangers (both 1st title)
- Relegated: Cowlairs (not re-elected)
- Matches: 90
- Goals: 409 (4.54 per match)
- Top goalscorer: Jack Bell (20 goals)
- Biggest home win: Celtic 9–1 Vale of Leven (5 May 1891)
- Biggest away win: Heart of Midlothian 0–5 Celtic (23 August 1890); Cowlairs 1–6 Dumbarton (25 October 1890); Cowlairs 0–5 Celtic (29 April 1891)
- Highest scoring: Cowlairs 7–5 Abercorn (28 February 1891)
- Longest winning run: 8 games: Dumbarton
- Longest unbeaten run: 14 games: Dumbarton
- Longest winless run: 8 games: St Mirren
- Longest losing run: 7 games: Abercorn

The 1890–91 Scottish Football League was the first season of the Scottish Football League. It began on 16 August 1890 and concluded on 21 May 1891. The league was won jointly by Dumbarton and Rangers who ended the season with an equal number of points.

== Season overview ==
Dumbarton and Rangers ended the league season with an equal number of points so a play-off match was organised at Cathkin Park in Glasgow on 21 May 1891 to determine the winner. The game ended in a 2–2 draw so both clubs were declared champions.

On 30 September 1890 after playing four games in the league, Renton was suspended by the Scottish Football Association for professionalism, and the club was subsequently expelled from the league with their record expunged. Celtic, 3rd LRV and Cowlairs were docked four points each for fielding ineligible players. At the end of the season, the bottom three teams had to submit applications to rejoin the league for the next season along with other non-league clubs. St Mirren, Vale of Leven and Cowlairs submitted applications along with non-league club Leith Athletic. In the election, Cowlairs lost their league position to Leith Athletic, with St Mirren and Vale of Leven being re-elected.

== Clubs ==
The inaugural season of the Scottish Football League was contested by 11 clubs. This was reduced to 10 clubs after four games when Renton was expelled from the league for professionalism.

Locations of teams in the 1890–91 Scottish Football League

Team	Home town/city	Home ground
3rd LRV	Glasgow	Cathkin Park
Abercorn	Paisley	Underwood Park
Cambuslang	Cambuslang	Whitefield Park
Celtic	Glasgow	Celtic Park
Cowlairs	Glasgow	Springvale Park
Dumbarton	Dumbarton	Boghead Park
Heart of Midlothian	Edinburgh	Tynecastle
Rangers	Glasgow	Ibrox Park
Renton	Renton	Tontine Park
St Mirren	Paisley	Westmarch
Vale of Leven	Alexandria	Millburn Park

== Table ==
Pos	Team	Pld	W	D	L	GF	GA	GD	Pts	Qualification or relegation
1	Dumbarton (Note: Dumbarton and Rangers finished equal on points, and a play-off to determine the winner ended in a 2−2 draw so both teams were declared joint champions.) (C)	18	13	3	2	61	21	+40	29	Joint Champions
1	Rangers (C)	18	13	3	2	58	25	+33	29	Joint Champions
3	Celtic	18	11	3	4	48	21	+27	21 (Note: Celtic, 3rd LRV and Cowlairs were deducted four points each for fielding ineligible players.)	
4	Cambuslang	18	8	4	6	47	42	+5	20	
5	3rd LRV	18	8	3	7	38	39	−1	15	
6	Heart of Midlothian	18	6	2	10	31	37	−6	14	
7	Abercorn	18	5	2	11	36	47	−11	12	
8	St Mirren	18	5	1	12	39	62	−23	11	Re-elected
8	Vale of Leven	18	5	1	12	27	65	−38	11	Re-elected
10	Cowlairs (Note: Cowlairs failed re-election to compete in the league for the next season.) (R)	18	3	4	11	24	50	−26	6	Not re-elected
11	Renton (Note: Renton were expelled from the league in September 1890 for professionalism and their record was expunged.)	0	0	0	0	0	0	0	0	Expelled, record expunged

Rules for classification: 1) Points;
(C) Champions; (R) Relegated

== Results ==
Home \ Away	ABC	CAM	CEL	COW	DUM	HOM	RAN	STM	VOL	3RD
Abercorn		2–5	1–5	1–0	1–2	1–0	1–1	5–1	6–0	2–4
Cambuslang	4–5		3–1	4–0	2–2	2–0	2–6	3–2	8–2	2–2
Celtic	2–0	5–2		2–0	1–0	1–0	2–2	3–2	9–1	1–1
Cowlairs	7–5	1–1	0–5		1–6	1–2	0–2	4–2	3–2	2–2
Dumbarton	5–1	5–0	2–2	1–1		3–1	5–1	5–1	4–0	5–1
Heart of Midlothian	1–1	2–2	0–5	4–0	0–4		0–1	1–0	8–1	4–1
Rangers	2–0	2–1	1–2	1–1	4–2	5–2		8–2	4–0	4–1
St Mirren	4–2	2–3	1–0	5–2	2–4	3–2	3–7		1–1	3–2
Vale of Leven	2–1	2–1	3–1	2–1	1–3	2–4	1–3	5–2		1–2
3rd Lanark RV	2–1	1–2	2–1	3–0	1–3	4–0	0–4	5–3	4–1	

Legend: Blue = home team win; Yellow = draw; Red = away team win.

== Championship play-off ==
Rangers defeated 3rd Lanark RV 4–1 in their final league match on 9 May 1891 to move level with Dumbarton on 29 points, and a play-off was organised to determine which team would be crowned champions. However, the match finished as a draw and, with no more dates available for a further replay before the end of the season, it was decided that Dumbarton and Rangers would be declared joint champions.

21 May 1891

Dumbarton	2–2	Rangers
Miller; Taylor		A. McCreadie; Hislop

Cathkin Park, Glasgow
Attendance: 10,000
Referee: J. Marshall

Dumbarton:
GK	John McLeod
RB	Daniel Watson
LB	Alex Miller
RH	Tom McMillan
CH	Dickie Boyle
LH	Leitch Keir
OR	Jack Taylor
IR	James Galbraith
CF	John Miller
IL	James McNaught
OL	Jack Bell

Rangers:
GK	David Reid
RB	Donald Gow
LB	William Hodge
RH	Robert Marshall
CH	Andrew McCreadie
LH	David Mitchell
OR	David Hislop
IR	James Henderson
CF	Neil Kerr
IL	John McPherson
OL	John Allan (Note: Some sources credit an appearance to Hugh McCreadie rather than John Allan, but contemporary reports contradict this; consequently the goal by 'McCreadie' must have been scored by Andrew.)

== See also ==
- 1890–91 in Scottish football
- 1904–05 Scottish Division One#Championship play-off
