= Alex Miller (1890s footballer) =

Scottish footballer

Personal information
- Full name: Alexander Miller

Senior career*
Years	Team	Apps	(Gls)
1888–1898	Dumbarton	89	(1)
1896–1897	Rangers (loan)	2	
1897–1898	Clyde (loan)	1	
- * Club domestic league appearances and goals

Alex Miller was a Scottish football player during the 1880s and 1890s.

== Career ==
Miller played for the vast majority of his career with Dumbarton, but had two short loan spells with Rangers and Clyde before retiring.

== Honours ==
Dumbarton

- Scottish League: Champions 1890-1891;1891-1892
- Scottish Cup: Runners Up 1890-1891
- Dumbartonshire Cup: Winners 1888-1889;1891-1892;1893–94;1894–95 Runners Up 1895–96
- League Charity Cup: 1890–91
- Greenock Charity Cup: Runners Up 1888-89
