= 1889–90 in Scottish football =

Football in Scotland
- Season: 1889–90

1889–90 in Scottish football

Scottish Cup winners
- Queen's Park

Junior Cup winners
- Burnbank Swifts

Scotland national team
- 1890 BHC

The 1889–90 season was the 17th season of competitive football in Scotland.

== Honours ==
=== Cup honours ===
==== National ====
Competition	Winner	Score	Runner-up
Scottish Cup	Queen's Park	2 – 1 (Note: Replay needed.)	Vale of Leven
Scottish Junior Cup	Burnbank Swifts	3 – 1	Benburb

==== County ====
Competition	Winner	Score	Runner-up
Aberdeenshire Cup	Aberdeen	8 – 3	Orion
Ayrshire Cup	Annbank	3 – 2	Hurlford
Buteshire Cup	Bute Thistle	7 – 1	Bute North End
Dumbartonshire Cup	Dumbarton	2 – 0	Vale of Leven
East of Scotland Shield	Hearts	2 – 0	Leith Athletic
Fife Cup	Cowdenbeath	5 –0	Lochgelly Athletic
Forfarshire Cup	Dundee Our Boys	2 – 1	Dundee East End
Glasgow Cup	Queen's Park	5 – 2	Celtic
Lanarkshire Cup	Royal Albert	4 – 2	Airdrie
Linlithgowshire Cup	Broxburn	7 – 0	Bellstane Birds
North of Scotland Cup	Caledonian	3 – 1	Inverness Thistle
Perthshire Cup	St Johnstone	5 – 1	Coupar Angus
Renfrewshire Cup	Abercorn	1 – 0	Port Glasgow Athletic
Stirlingshire Cup	Falkirk	9 – 0	Gairdoch

== Scotland national team ==
Date	Venue	Opponents	Score (Note: Scotland's score is shown first.)
22 March 1890	Underwood Park, Paisley	Wales	5 – 0
29 March 1890	Ulster Cricket Ground, Belfast	Ireland	4 – 1
5 April 1890	Hampden Park, Glasgow	England	1 – 1

Team	Pld	W	D	L	GF	GA	GD	Pts
England (C)	3	2	1	0	13	3	+10	5
Scotland (C)	3	2	1	0	10	2	+8	5
Wales	3	1	0	2	6	10	−4	2
Ireland	3	0	0	3	4	18	−14	0

Rules for classification: 1) points. The points system worked as follows: 2 points for a win and 1 point for a draw
(C) Champions
