= 1894–95 Scottish Football League =

Scottish football season

Status of the Scottish Football League in season 1894–95.

== Overview ==
Hearts won the Scottish Division One.

Hibernian topped the Scottish Division Two for the second successive year. Renton failed to show for their fixture at Dundee Wanderers, hence only 17 games played for both clubs. Dundee Wanderers were awarded the two points for the game.

== Scottish League Division One ==
| Pos | Team | Pld | W | D | L | GF | GA | GD | Pts | Qualification or relegation |
|---|---|---|---|---|---|---|---|---|---|---|
| 1 | Heart of Midlothian (C) | 18 | 15 | 1 | 2 | 50 | 18 | +32 | 31 | Champions |
| 2 | Celtic | 18 | 11 | 4 | 3 | 50 | 29 | +21 | 26 | |
| 3 | Rangers | 18 | 10 | 2 | 6 | 41 | 26 | +15 | 22 | |
| 4 | Third Lanark | 18 | 10 | 1 | 7 | 51 | 39 | +12 | 21 | |
| 5 | St Mirren | 18 | 9 | 1 | 8 | 34 | 34 | 0 | 19 | |
| 6 | St Bernard's | 18 | 8 | 1 | 9 | 37 | 40 | −3 | 17 | |
| 7 | Clyde | 18 | 8 | 0 | 10 | 38 | 47 | −9 | 16 | |
| 8 | Dundee | 18 | 6 | 2 | 10 | 28 | 33 | −5 | 14 | |
| 9 | Dumbarton | 18 | 3 | 1 | 14 | 27 | 58 | −31 | 7 | |
| 10 | Leith Athletic (R) | 18 | 3 | 1 | 14 | 32 | 64 | −32 | 7 | Relegated to the 1895–96 Scottish Division Two |

Source: "1894-1895 Division 1 - SPFL Archive". SPFL.
Rules for classification: Teams finish equal if level on points. Points system: 2 points for a win, 1 point for a draw, 0 points for a loss
(C) Champions; (R) Relegated

== Scottish League Division Two ==
| Pos | Team | Pld | W | D | L | GF | GA | GD | Pts | Promotion or relegation |
|---|---|---|---|---|---|---|---|---|---|---|
| 1 | Hibernian (C, P) | 18 | 14 | 2 | 2 | 92 | 28 | +64 | 30 | Promoted to the 1895–96 Scottish First Division |
| 2 | Motherwell | 18 | 10 | 2 | 6 | 56 | 39 | +17 | 22 | |
| 3 | Port Glasgow Athletic | 18 | 8 | 4 | 6 | 62 | 56 | +6 | 20 | |
| 3 | Renton | 17 | 10 | 0 | 7 | 46 | 44 | +2 | 20 | |
| 5 | Morton | 18 | 9 | 1 | 8 | 59 | 63 | −4 | 19 | |
| 6 | Abercorn | 18 | 7 | 4 | 7 | 51 | 65 | −14 | 18 | |
| 6 | Airdrieonians | 18 | 8 | 2 | 8 | 68 | 45 | +23 | 18 | |
| 8 | Partick Thistle | 18 | 7 | 3 | 8 | 50 | 62 | −12 | 17 | |
| 9 | Dundee Wanderers (R) | 17 | 3 | 1 | 13 | 44 | 86 | −42 | 9 (Note: Renton failed to turn up for a fixture against Dundee Wanderers. Two points were awarded to Dundee Wanderers.) | Resigned (Note: Both Dundee Wanderers and Cowlairs resigned from the league at the end of the season.) |
| 10 | Cowlairs (R) | 18 | 2 | 3 | 13 | 37 | 77 | −40 | 7 | Resigned |

Source: statto.com
Rules for classification: Teams finish equal if level on points. Points system: 2 points for a win, 1 point for a draw, 0 points for a loss
(C) Champions; (P) Promoted; (R) Relegated

== See also ==
- 1894–95 in Scottish football
