= Celtic Park (1888) =

Former football ground in Glasgow, Scotland (1888–1892)

- Location within Glasgow council area
- Location: Glasgow, Scotland
- Coordinates: 55.8499°N 4.2013°W
- Surface: Grass
- Field size: 110 x 66 yards

Construction
- Built: 1887–88
- Opened: 8 May 1888
- Closed: 1892

Tenant
- Celtic

Celtic Park was a football ground in Glasgow, Scotland. It was the home ground of Celtic from 1888 until they moved to the site of the modern Celtic Park in 1892. The ground staged an international match between Scotland and Ireland in 1891.

== History ==
Located to the south-east of the Eastern Necropolis graveyard in the Parkhead district of Glasgow, Celtic Park was opened on 8 May 1888. The club had obtained a lease on the site on 13 November 1887, and over the next six months Celtic founder Brother Walfrid brought together a large group of Irish volunteers to build the ground; they erected an uncovered stand with a capacity of around 1,000, laid a nineteen-foot wide track around the pitch (with the aim of hosting cycling events), and created banking around the track to be used as terracing. Although the ground was built for Celtic, the opening match at the stadium on 8 May 1888 was between the Edinburgh-based Hibernian and Glasgow club Cowlairs, a game that ended in a 0–0 draw with a crowd of 3,000 present. Hibernian had agreed to play the opening match in order to fulfil a promise that the club's founder and manager Canon Edward Joseph Hannan had made to Brother Walfrid; Celtic benefited from the gate receipts. Celtic's first match at the ground was played on 28 May 1888 against Rangers, with the home side winning 5–2 in front of almost 2,000 spectators.

In 1890 Celtic were founder members of the Scottish Football League (SFL). On the opening day of the league's first season, Celtic played Renton at Celtic Park. Renton's Cameron scored the first-ever goal in the SFL as the visitors won 4–1 in front of a crowd of 10,000. The ground hosted a Scotland international match against Ireland in the 1890–91 British Home Championship; the match was played on 28 March 1891 and ended in a 2–1 win for Scotland. The highest recorded league attendance at Celtic Park was 15,000 for a match against Hearts on 17 October 1891, with Celtic winning 3–1.

In 1892 Celtic decided to leave the ground after the landlord increased the annual rent from £50 to £450. The club moved a short distance to a new ground, which was also named Celtic Park. The final league match at the original Celtic Park was played on 14 May 1892, a 2–0 win over Leith Athletic. After the Renton match (the result of which had been expunged when Renton were expelled from the SFL a few weeks into the season), Celtic had not lost another league game at the ground. The site was later used for housing.
