= Forfarshire Cup =

Scottish football tournament

The Forfarshire Cup is a football competition in Scotland competed for by teams in the Forfarshire Football Association from Angus, Dundee and Perth. The name of the competition is often baffling to some, as "Forfarshire" is an archaic and anglicised name for Angus which became official in the late 19th century around the time of Local Government (Scotland) Act 1889 which restructured and renamed many of Scotland's counties, however the name quickly fell into disuse and was very rarely used in everyday conversation and non existent today.

The Forfarshire Football Association was founded in 1883 and comprised eighteen clubs. Twelve from Dundee, two from Arbroath and one each from Broughty Ferry and Lochee (both independent of Dundee at the time), Coupar Angus and Montrose. The association immediately put up a trophy for competition between its member clubs. At that time, cup competitions were the only form of organised football in Scotland. In the early days of Scottish football the county cups were regarded as just as prestigious as the Scottish Cup, especially outwith the west of Scotland and the Central Belt whose teams were most successful in the Scottish Cup, with the result that they often attracted substantial crowds. Even in 1911, several special trains conveyed supporters of Arbroath to Dens Park for the final against Dundee Hibs and they contributed to a crowd of more than 7,000.

The competition has continued to be played every season as of 2006, although the Dundee clubs left in the 1980s. Dundee United asked the Forfarshire FA for permission to field their reserve team, as it had become virtually impossible for United to find suitable dates for their ties due to their regular participation in European competition. When this was refused the club withdrew from the competition and the FFA; shortly afterwards, Dundee followed suit. United re-entered the competition in the 2001–02 season, and the club now fields a mixture of first team and reserve/youth players. Even long before this Dundee played reserve teams in the early 20th century and withdrew from various seasons' competitions. Dundee withdrew completely for a few years in the early 1950s and also in the 1960s due to fixture congestion. From 2011–12 season, the competition was played as an under-19 tournament.

Dundee, to date, have won 28 trophies and as such are the most successful team in the competition's history.

Forfarshire FA remains an Affiliated Association of the Scottish Football Association.

== List of winners ==
- Until October 1923 Dundee United were known as Dundee Hibernian
- Lochee United were a senior team not affiliated with their junior namesake
- 1919–1920 competition was replayed after Dundee appealed against an ineligible player
- 1927–1928 competition was discontinued at the semi-final stage
- Stadium info- Rollo's Pier- home of Strathmore (Dundee). Strathmore later merged with Johnstone Wanderers to form Dundee Wanderers. East Dock Street- home of Dundee Harp.

Season	Winner	Runner-up	Score	Venue	Attendance
1883–84	Arbroath	Dundee Harp	2–1	Rollo's Pier	5,000
1884–85	Dundee Harp	Strathmore (Arbroath)	2–2; 15–1 (R)	Rollo's Pier	8,000 (replay)
1885–86	Dundee Harp	Arbroath	5–3	West Craigie Park	11,000
1886–87	Dundee Harp	Strathmore (Dundee)	4–2	West Craigie Park	7,000
1887–88	Arbroath	Strathmore (Dundee)	10–2	East Dock Street	7,000
1888–89	Arbroath	Dundee East End	2–1	East Dock Street	3,500
1889–90	Dundee Our Boys	Dundee East End	2–1	East Dock Street	6,000
1890–91	Dundee Our Boys	Dundee East End	6–2	East Dock Street	
1891–92	Montrose	Dundee East End	5–3	Carolina Port	
1892–93	Arbroath	Dundee Harp	1–0	Carolina Port	
1893–94	Dundee	Dundee Harp	4–0	Carolina Port	10,000
1894–95	Dundee	Lochee United	1–0	Gayfield Park	
1895–96	Arbroath	Dundee	2–0	East Dock Street	
1896–97	Arbroath	Forfar Athletic	2–2; 5–2 (R)	Carolina Port	
1897–98	Dundee Wanderers	Arbroath	1–1; 7–5 (R)	Carolina Port	
1898–99	Arbroath	Dundee Wanderers	4–2	Carolina Port	
1899–1900	Arbroath	Lochee United	3–3; 1–0 (R)	Dens Park	5,000 (replay)
1900–01	Dundee	Dundee Wanderers	1–0	Dens Park	4,000
1901–02	Dundee Wanderers	Arbroath	3–2	Dens Park	6,000
1902–03	Dundee	Montrose	2–1	Links Park	2,000
1903–04	Dundee Wanderers	Montrose	1–1; 3–0 (R)	Dens Park; Gayfield Park (replay)	5,000
1904–05	Dundee	Arbroath	walkover		
1905–06	Forfar Athletic	Arbroath	1–1; 2–1 (R)	Dens Park; Links Park (replay)	
1906–07	Arbroath	Dundee	1–0	Dens Park	2,000
1907–08	Forfar Athletic	Montrose	4–1	Dens Park	5,000
1908–09	Dundee	Brechin City	2–0	Dens Park	3,000
1909–10	Brechin City	Arbroath	4–1	Dens Park	
1910–11	Dundee Hibernian	Arbroath	1–0	Dens Park	7,000
1911–12	Dundee	Brechin City	2–0	Dens Park	3,000
1912–13	Dundee	Montrose	1–1; 7–0 (R)	Dens Park	3,000 (replay)
1913–14	Arbroath	Dundee Hibernian	1–1; 2–1	Dens Park	8,000; 9,000 (replay)
1914–15	Dundee Hibernian	Arbroath	2–0	Dens Park	5,000
1915–16	Suspended during World War I				
1916–17	Suspended during World War I				
1917–18	Suspended during World War I				
1918–19	Suspended during World War I				
1919–20	Dundee Hibernian	Dundee	1–0	Dens Park	12,000
1920–21	Arbroath	Dundee	2–2; 3–0 (R)	Dens Park; Gayfield Park	9,000; 2,000 (replay)
1921–22	Montrose	Forfar Athletic	1–0	Gayfield Park	5,000
1922–23	Dundee	Forfar Athletic	2–0	Dens Park	
1923–24	Arbroath	Forfar Athletic	3–0	Dens Park	
1924–25	Dundee	Arbroath	1–0	Dens Park	6,000
1925–26	Dundee	Arbroath	4–2	Tannadice Park	
1926–27	Brechin City	Montrose	4–3 agg	Links Park; Glebe Park	
1927–28	Not completed				
1928–29	Dundee United	Forfar Athletic	2–1	Dens Park	
1929–30	Dundee United	Montrose	2–1	Dens Park	
1930–31	Forfar Athletic	Dundee	2–1	Dens Park	
1931–32	Montrose	Dundee United	1–0	Gayfield Park	
1932–33	Montrose	Dundee	1–1; 1–0 (R)	Gayfield Park	2,000; 2,500 (replay)
1933–34	Arbroath	Brechin City	4–1	Tannadice Park	
1934–35	Dundee	Arbroath	1–1; 1–0 (R)	Tannadice Park	11,600; 8,600 (replay)
1935–36	Arbroath	Montrose	1–0	Gayfield Park	
1936–37	Arbroath	Brechin City	3–1	Links Park	
1937–38	Dundee	Dundee United	3–0	Dens Park	3,000
1938–39	Arbroath	Dundee United	2–0	Dens Park	
1939–40	Arbroath	Dundee	1–1; 2–0 (R)	Dens Park; Gayfield Park	2,000; 1,500 (replay)
1940–41	Suspended during World War II				
1941–42	Suspended during World War II				
1942–43	Suspended during World War II				
1943–44	Suspended during World War II				
1944–45	Dundee	Arbroath	6–0	Dens Park	6,500
1945–46	Dundee	Forfar Athletic	6–1	Dens Park	4,000
1946–47	Dundee	Dundee United	5–0	Dens Park	14,000
1947–48	Dundee United	Arbroath	4–1	Dens Park	
1948–49	Dundee	Arbroath	1–1; 2–0 (R)	Dens Park	5,500 (replay)
1949–50	Dundee	Brechin City	3–2 (aet)	Dens Park	3,500
1950–51	Dundee United	Dundee	3–2	Dens Park	12,500
1951–52	Montrose	Arbroath	2–1	Gayfield Park	
1952–53	Brechin City	Dundee United	2–1	Tannadice Park	
1953–54	Dundee United	Arbroath	2–1	Tannadice Park	3,000
1954–55	Dundee	Montrose	6–0	Dens Park	1,500
1955–56	Dundee	Arbroath	2–0	Dens Park	4,500
1956–57	Not completed				
1957–58	Arbroath	Forfar Athletic	3–2	Glebe Park	3,000
1958–59	Brechin City	Dundee United	6–0	Gayfield Park	
1959–60	Dundee	Forfar Athletic	3–2	Dens Park	6,500
1960–61	Dundee United	Montrose	6–3	Tannadice Park	
1961–62	Montrose	Arbroath	2–1	Gayfield Park	
1962–63	Dundee United	Arbroath	2–1 (aet)	Dens Park	6,000
1963–64	Dundee United	Montrose	4–0	Tannadice Park	
1964–65	Dundee United	Dundee	1–0	Tannadice Park	15,000
1965–66	Dundee	Brechin City	2–1	Dens Park	1,500
1966–67	Dundee	Dundee United	4–3	Dens Park	7,000
1967–68	Not completed				
1968–69	Dundee United	Arbroath	2–0	Tannadice Park	
1969–70	Not completed				
1970–71	Dundee	Dundee United	2–0	Tannadice Park	8,000
1971–72	Dundee United	Dundee	4–0	Tannadice Park	6,500
1972–73	Montrose	Dundee United	2–1	Gayfield Park	
1973–74	Not completed				
1974–75	Dundee United	Montrose	3–1	Links Park	
1975–76	Dundee United	Dundee	3–1	Tannadice Park	10,778
1976–77	Dundee United	Arbroath	3–0	Gayfield Park	
1977–78	Not completed				
1978–79	Forfar Athletic	Dundee	3–1	Station Park	2,000
1979–80	Dundee United	Dundee	2–1	Dens Park	9,027
1980–81	Not completed				
1981–82	Not completed				
1982–83	Not completed				
1983–84	Forfar Athletic	Dundee	3–2	Station Park	2,308
1984–85	Dundee United	Forfar Athletic	2–1	Tannadice Park	2,580
1985–86	Dundee	Dundee United	2–0	Tannadice Park	5,201
1986–87	Dundee United	Montrose	5–0	Tannadice Park	1,162
1987–88	Dundee United	Dundee	3–2	Dens Park	4,773
1988–89	Dundee	Arbroath	3–0	Gayfield Park	
1989–90	Dundee	St Johnstone	3–2	McDiarmid Park	4,786
1990–91	Forfar Athletic	Brechin City			
1991–92	Montrose	St Johnstone	4–1	Links Park	
1992–93	St Johnstone	Montrose	4–1	Links Park	473
1993–94	Arbroath	Dundee	2–0	Gayfield Park	
1994–95	Forfar Athletic	St Johnstone	3–2	Station Park	483
1995–96	Arbroath	Forfar Athletic	3–2	Gayfield Park	
1996–97	Brechin City				
1997–98	Forfar Athletic	St Johnstone	2–1	Station Park	
1998–99	St Johnstone	Brechin City	1–0	McDiarmid Park	
1999–2000	Dundee	Forfar Athletic	2–2 (4–3 pens)	Station Park	
2000–01	Not completed				
2001–02	Dundee United	Montrose	5–1	Tannadice Park	
2002–03	Not completed				
2003–04	St Johnstone	Montrose	2–0	McDiarmid Park	
2004–05	Dundee United	Forfar Athletic	1–0	Station Park	1,097
2005–06	Not completed				
2006–07	St Johnstone	Arbroath	3–2	Gayfield Park	
2007–08	Brechin City	Montrose	2–1	Glebe Park	353
2008–09	Not completed				
2009–10	Not completed				
2010–11	Not completed				
2011–12	St Johnstone	Dundee United	1–1 (4–2 pens.)	Tannadice Park	
2012–13	Not completed				
2013–14	Not completed				
2014–15	Forfar Athletic	Arbroath	3–3 (5–4 pens.)	Gayfield Park	577

Rank	Club	Number of Wins
1	Dundee	28
2	Dundee Hibernian/United	21
3	Arbroath	20
4	Montrose	10
5	Forfar Athletic	9
6	Brechin City	6
7	St Johnstone	5
8	Dundee Harp	3
=	Dundee Wanderers	3
10	Dundee Our Boys	2
