= 1888–89 in Scottish football =

Football in Scotland
- Season: 1888–89

1888–89 in Scottish football

Scottish Cup winners
- Third Lanark

Junior Cup winners
- Burnbank Swifts

Scotland national team
- 1889 BHC

The 1888–89 season was the 16th season of competitive football in Scotland.

== Honours ==
=== Cup honours ===
==== National ====
Competition	Winner	Score	Runner-up
Scottish Cup	Third Lanark	2 – 1	Celtic
Scottish Junior Cup	Burnbank Swifts	4 – 1	West Benhar Violet

==== County ====
Competition	Winner	Score	Runner-up
Aberdeenshire Cup	Aberdeen	4 – 3	Orion
Ayrshire Cup	Hurlford	2 – 0	Ayr
Buteshire Cup	Bute Rangers	3 – 1 (Note: Replay needed.)	Bute Thistle
Dumbartonshire Cup	Dumbarton	6 – 2	Dumbarton Athletic
East of Scotland Shield	Hearts	5 – 2	Leith Athletic
Fife Cup	Cowdenbeath	4 –2	Lassodie
Forfarshire Cup	Arbroath	2 – 1	Dundee East End
Glasgow Cup	Queen's Park	8 – 0	Partick Thistle
Lanarkshire Cup	Royal Albert	2 – 1	Uddingston
Linlithgowshire Cup	Bo'ness	1 – 0	Armadale
North of Scotland Cup	Crown	3 – 1	Inverness Rovers
Perthshire Cup	Dunblane	6 – 5	Fair City Athletic
Renfrewshire Cup	Abercorn	3 – 2	St Mirren
Stirlingshire Cup	East Stirlingshire	7 – 0	Slamannan

== Glasgow Exhibition Cup ==
The tournament was held to coincide with the International Exhibition of Science, Art and Industry. Held during the early season, the one-off competition was held at the Exhibition Grounds.

Competition	Winner	Score	Runner-up
Glasgow Exhibition Cup	Cowlairs	2 – 0	Celtic

== Scotland national team ==
Date	Venue	Opponents	Score (Note: Scotland's score is shown first.)
9 March 1889	Ibrox Stadium, Glasgow	Ireland	7 – 0
13 April 1889	Kennington Oval, London	England	3 – 2
15 April 1889	Racecourse Ground, Wrexham	Wales	0 – 0

Team	Pld	W	D	L	GF	GA	GD	Pts
Scotland	3	2	1	0	10	2	+8	5
England	3	2	0	1	12	5	+7	4
Wales	3	1	1	1	4	5	−1	3
Ireland	3	0	0	3	2	16	−14	0

Rules for classification: 1) points. The points system worked as follows: 2 points for a win and 1 point for a draw.
