= John McLeod (footballer, born 1866) =

Scottish footballer

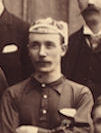

Personal information
- Full name: John McLeod
- Date of birth: 12 March 1866
- Place of birth: Dumbarton, Scotland
- Date of death: 4 February 1953 (aged 86)
- Place of death: Dumbarton, Scotland
- Position: Goalkeeper

Senior career*
Years	Team	Apps	(Gls)
1885–1889	Dumbarton Athletic		
1889–1895	Dumbarton	87	(3)
1895–1896	Rangers	5	(2)

International career
1888–1893	Scotland	5	(0)
1892–1893	Scottish League XI	2	(0)
- * Club domestic league appearances and goals

John McLeod (12 March 1866 – 4 February 1953) was a Scottish footballer who played as a goalkeeper.

== Career ==
McLeod played for Dumbarton Athletic, Dumbarton, Rangers and Scotland.

== Honours ==
Dumbarton

- Scottish League: Champions 1890–91 (shared), 1891–92
- Scottish Cup: Runners-up 1890–91
- Dumbartonshire Cup: 1889–90, 1890–91, 1891–92, 1892–93, 1893–94, 1894–95
- League Charity Cup: 1890–91
- Greenock Charity Cup: 1889–90
- 5 caps for Scotland between 1889 and 1893
- 2 caps for the Scottish League between 1891 and 1893
- 1 representative cap for Scotland against Canada XI in 1891
- 4 representative caps for Dumbartonshire
- 3 international trial matches for Scotland between 1890 and 1893

== See also ==
- List of Scotland national football team captains
