= Dundee Wanderers F.C. =

Former association football club in Scotland

Dundee Wanderers
- Full name: Dundee Wanderers Football Club
- Nickname(s): the Forkies, the Clepingtonians, the Maroons
- Founded: 1894
- Dissolved: 1913
- Ground: Clepington Park
1894–98 colours	1898–1911 colours

Dundee Wanderers Football Club was a football club based in Dundee, Scotland. They were formed in 1894 as a result of a merger between two local clubs, Johnstone Wanderers and Strathmore. The club was briefly a member of the Scottish Football League (SFL), playing in Division Two during the 1894–95 season, but after finishing second from bottom of the league they failed re-election. In December 1894 the suffered an all-time record SFL defeat, losing 15–1 to Airdrieonians. Their home ground was Clepington Park (now Tannadice Park, the home of Dundee United).

== History ==
Johnstone Wanderers and Strathmore were both members of the Northern League in the 1893–94 season, but, after six matches they both resigned. One week later, 1894 when a new club, Dundonians, was formed by merger between the two, and played its first match under that name against Hibernian that month. As the media often referred to the Dundee club as "the Dundonians", Dundee made a formal objection, and the new club instead used the Wanderers name.

The new club spent the 1894–95 season as members of the Second Division, finishing ninth out of ten. Their performance might well have been worse had they not been awarded two points after Renton failed to fulfil a fixture against the club, with the Dunbartonshire side instead opting for a glamour friendly against Queen's Park. Wanderers' brief sojourn in the Scottish League did produce one record that still stands, however, with the club's 15–1 away defeat to Airdrieonians remaining the heaviest defeat in Scottish League history.

The club lost the tenancy of Clepington Park during the summer of 1894, as a consequence of which they played the first half of their one season as a League club at East Dock Street. In December they returned to Clepington Park, but failed to secure re-election to the Scottish League for season 1895–96 and went on to join the Northern League.

They became Northern League champions in 1900, but lost the tenancy of Clepington Park again in 1909 to the newly formed Dundee Hibernian (later Dundee United). Rendered homeless, Wanderers had to play all of their matches on the grounds of their opponents the following season and, still unable to find a ground, were forced to resign from the Northern League at the end of it, playing only cup ties and friendly matches during 1910–11. Having secured the tenancy of St Margaret's Park in Lochee, the club re-joined the Northern League for season 1911–12 but their demise was approaching.

The final national competitive match played by Dundee Wanderers was a Scottish Cup tie at Arbroath on 7 September 1912, which it lost 8–0. The only record of the club taking the field again was for a Forfarshire Cup semi-final tie at Dens Park, Dundee (against Dundee 'A') on 15 March 1913. Wanderers had received a bye into the semi-final, but lost by six goals to one and the club was formally wound up at the end of that season.

== Stadium ==
The club originally played at Clepington Park. In 1910, after losing the tenancy, the club moved to St Margaret's Park, Lochee.

== Colours ==
The club originally played in red and white jerseys with blue knickers. In 1898 the club changed to the old Wanderers colours of maroon shirts with a blue sash. For its final two seasons the club played in navy blue and gold, leading to a nickname of the Wasps.

== Honours ==
As Dundee Wanderers.

Northern League

- 1899–1900

Forfarshire Cup

- 1897–98, 1901–02

Dewar Shield

- 1903–04

As Wanderers.

Burns Charity Cup

- 1886–87, 1887–88

Dundee Charity Cup

- 1893–94

Storrie Cup

- 1887–88
