= Underwood Park, Paisley =

Former football ground in Paisley, Scotland

Underwood Park
- Location within Renfrewshire
- Location: Paisley, Scotland
- Coordinates: 55.8493°N 4.4375°W
- Surface: Grass
- Record attendance: 7,500

Construction
- Opened: 1889
- Closed: 1899

Tenant
- Abercorn (1889–1899)

Underwood Park was a football ground in Paisley, Scotland. It was the home ground of Abercorn during their first decade in the Scottish Football League.

== History ==
Abercorn moved to the ground in 1889 from Blackstoun Park. The new ground had a 750-capacity wooden stand along the western side of the pitch, with a pavilion brought from Blackstoun Park re-erected in the north-west corner of the ground. In 1890 the wooden stand had a roof added to it, with a cycling and running track later added around the pitch.

Abercorn were founder members of the Scottish Football League, and the first league game was played at Underwood Park on 13 September 1890 against Renton. However, when Renton were later expelled from the league, the result was expunged. On 22 March 1890 the ground was used for a British Home Championship game between Scotland and Wales, with Scotland winning 5–0. in front of a crowd of 7,500. Abercorn's highest league attendance at Underwood Park was set early the following season when 6,000 saw a 5–2 defeat to Celtic on 12 September 1891.

On 21 July 1894 Andrew Hannah of Clydesdale Harriers set a Scottish All-comers record of 9:41 for two miles in a race held at the ground. However, the record lasted for only ninety minutes, as the same afternoon Fred Bacon (Ashton-under-Lyme H.) ran 9:27 2/5 at the Edinburgh Northern Harriers Sports at the Powderhall Grounds in Edinburgh.

In 1899 Abercorn moved to Old Ralston Park, with the council buying the site to use for stables and waste destruction. The final league match was played at Underwood Park on 8 April 1899, a 3–3 draw against Ayr.
