= 1900–01 Heart of Midlothian F.C. season =

Heart of Midlothian
1900–01 season
- Stadium: Tynecastle Park
- Scottish First Division: 10th
- Scottish Cup: Winners

During the 1900–01 season Hearts competed in the Scottish First Division, the Scottish Cup and the East of Scotland Shield.

== Fixtures ==
=== East of Scotland Shield ===
13 April 1901 East of Scotland Shield R1	Hibernian	1–1	Hearts	Easter Road

20 April 1901 East of Scotland Shield R1 Replay	Hibernian	1–0	Hearts	Easter Road

6 May 1901 East of Scotland Shield SF	Hearts	4–0	St Bernard's	Easter Road

18 May 1901 East of Scotland Shield Final	Hearts	2–3	Leith Athletic	Easter Road

=== Rosebery Charity Cup ===
20 May 1901 Rosebery Charity Cup SF	St Bernard's	4–4	Hearts	Royal Gymnasium Ground

25 May 1901 Rosebery Charity Cup SF Replay	St Bernard's	1–2	Hearts	Royal Gymnasium Ground

31 May 1901 Rosebery Charity Cup Final	Hibernian	4–0	Hearts	Easter Road

=== Scottish Cup ===
12 January 1901 Scottish Cup R1	Hearts	7–0	Mossend Swifts	Tynecastle Park
				Attendance: 3,000

9 February 1901 Scottish Cup R2	Hearts	2–1	Queen's Park	Tynecastle Park
				Attendance: 14,000

16 February 1901 Scottish Cup R3	Port Glasgow Athletic	1–5	Hearts	Clune Park
				Attendance: 4,500

9 March 1901 Scottish Cup SF	Hearts	1–1	Hibernian	Tynecastle Park
				Attendance: 19,500

23 March 1901 Scottish Cup SF Replay	Hibernian	1–2	Hearts	Easter Road
				Attendance: 18,000

6 April 1901 Scottish Cup Final	Hearts	4–3	Celtic	Ibrox Park
				Attendance: 17,000

=== East of Scotland League ===
15 August 1900 East of Scotland League	Hearts	1–3	Leith Athletic	Tynecastle Park

18 August 1900 East of Scotland League	Hibernian	3–2	Hearts	Easter Road

24 November 1900 East of Scotland League	Hearts	6–0	Raith Rovers	Tynecastle Park

5 January 1901 East of Scotland League	Hearts	4–3	St Bernard's	Tynecastle Park

16 March 1901 East of Scotland League	Hearts	0–1	Dundee	Tynecastle Park

30 March 1901 East of Scotland League	Leith Athletic	0–3	Hearts	Chancelot Park

4 May 1901 East of Scotland League	Dundee	4–1	Hearts	Dens Park

=== Inter City League ===
1 January 1901 Inter City Football League	Hibernian	3–1	Hearts	Easter Road

2 January 1901 Inter City Football League	Celtic	3–2	Hearts	Celtic Park

23 February 1901 Inter City Football League	Hearts	3–2	Celtic	Tynecastle Park

2 March 1901 Inter City Football League	Rangers	2–2	Hearts	Ibrox Park

8 April 1901 Inter City Football League	Third Lanark	1–3	Hearts	Cathkin Park

15 April 1901 Inter City Football League	Hearts	3–4	Third Lanark	Tynecastle Park

27 April 1901 Inter City Football League	Hearts	1–1	Rangers	Hampden Park

7 May 1901 Inter City Football League	Queen's Park	1–0	Hearts	Hampden Park

11 May 1901 Inter City Football League	Hearts	4–0	Queen's Park	Tynecastle Park

15 May 1901 Inter City Football League	Hearts	0–1	Hibernian	Tynecastle Park

=== Scottish First Division ===
25 August 1900 Scottish First Division	Hearts	0–1	Rangers	Tynecastle Park
				Attendance: 11,000

1 September 1900 Scottish First Division	Hibernian	3–0	Hearts	Easter Road
				Attendance: 10,500

8 September 1900 Scottish First Division	Hearts	0–4	Dundee	Tynecastle Park
				Attendance: 7,500

15 September 1900 Scottish First Division	Morton	2–2	Hearts	Cappielow Park
				Attendance: 5,000

17 September 1900 Scottish First Division	Hearts	0–2	Celtic	Tynecastle Park
				Attendance: 7,000

22 September 1900 Scottish First Division	Hearts	1–2	Queen's Park	Tynecastle Park
				Attendance: 8,000

24 September 1900 Scottish First Division	Rangers	1–0	Hearts	Ibrox Park
				Attendance: 6,000

29 September 1900 Scottish First Division	Dundee	1–2	Hearts	Dens Park
				Attendance: 6,000

6 October 1900 Scottish First Division	Hearts	1–3	Partick Thistle	Tynecastle Park
				Attendance: 3,000

13 October 1900 Scottish First Division	Hearts	0–0	Hibernian	Tynecastle Park
				Attendance: 6,500

20 October 1900 Scottish First Division	St Mirren	2–1	Hearts	St Mirren Park, Love Street
				Attendance: 5,000

27 October 1900 Scottish First Division	Hearts	1–2	Morton	Tynecastle Park
				Attendance: 2,500

3 November 1900 Scottish First Division	Hearts	0–0	Third Lanark	Tynecastle Park
				Attendance: 3,000

10 November 1900 Scottish First Division	Kilmarnock	1–3	Hearts	Rugby Park
				Attendance: 4,000

17 November 1900 Scottish First Division	Celtic	1–3	Hearts	Celtic Park
				Attendance: 6,000

1 December 1900 Scottish First Division	Hearts	0–0	St Mirren	Tynecastle Park
				Attendance: 1,500

8 December 1900 Scottish First Division	Hearts	7–0	Kilmarnock	Tynecastle Park
				Attendance: 3,000

15 December 1900 Scottish First Division	Partick Thistle	0–1	Hearts	Meadowside
				Attendance: 3,500

22 December 1900 Scottish First Division	Third Lanark	1–0	Hearts	Cathkin Park
				Attendance: 3,000

19 January 1901 Scottish First Division	Queen's Park	4–0	Hearts	Hampden Park
				Attendance: 8,000

== See also ==
- List of Heart of Midlothian F.C. seasons
