= 1899–1900 Heart of Midlothian F.C. season =

Heart of Midlothian
1899–1900 season
- Stadium: Tynecastle Park
- Scottish First Division: 4th
- Scottish Cup: Semi-finalists
Home colours

During the 1899–1900 season Hearts competed in the Scottish First Division, the Scottish Cup and the East of Scotland Shield.

== Fixtures ==
=== East of Scotland Shield ===
5 May 1900 East of Scotland Shield Final	Hibernian	0–3	Hearts	Easter Road

=== Rosebery Charity Cup ===
24 April 1900 Rosebery Charity Cup SF	St Bernard's	0–4	Hearts	Easter Road

19 May 1900 Rosebery Charity Cup Final	Hearts	3–3	Hibernian	Tynecastle Park

23 May 1900 Rosebery Charity Cup Final Replay	Hearts	3–0	Hibernian	Old Powderhall

=== Scottish Cup ===
13 January 1900 Scottish Cup R1	Hearts	0–0	St Mirren	Tynecastle Park
				Attendance: 6,500

20 January 1900 Scottish Cup R1 Replay	St Mirren	0–3	Hearts	Love Street
				Attendance: 6,000

27 January 1900 Scottish Cup R2	Hearts	1–1	Hibernian	Tynecastle Park
				Attendance: 14,000

3 February 1900 Scottish Cup R2 Replay	Hibernian	1–2	Hearts	Easter Road
				Attendance: 12,500

10 February 1900 Scottish Cup R3	Third Lanark	1–2	Hearts	Cathkin Park
				Attendance: 3,000

10 March 1900 Scottish Cup SF	Queen's Park	2–1	Hearts	Hampden Park
				Attendance: 16,000

=== East of Scotland League ===
15 August 1900 East of Scotland League	Hearts	1–3	Leith Athletic	Tynecastle Park

15 August 1900 East of Scotland League	Hearts	1–3	Leith Athletic	Tynecastle Park

6 January 1900 East of Scotland League	Hearts	7–0	Raith Rovers	Tynecastle Park

24 March 1900 East of Scotland League	Hearts	2–1	Dundee	Tynecastle Park

9 April 1900 East of Scotland League	Dundee	1–0	Hearts	Dens Park

14 April 1900 East of Scotland League	Hearts	0–0	Leith Athletic	Tynecastle Park

30 April 1900 East of Scotland League	St Bernard's	3–1	Hearts	Old Logie Green

12 May 1900 East of Scotland League	Hibernian	0–0	Hearts	Easter Road

=== Inter City League ===
30 December 1899 Inter City Football League	Rangers	3–1	Hearts	Ibrox Park

1 January 1900 Inter City Football League	Hearts	3–3	Hibernian	Tynecastle Park

17 February 1900 Inter City Football League	Queen's Park	1–0	Hearts	Hampden Park

3 March 1900 Inter City Football League	Hearts	1–3	Third Lanark	Tynecastle Park

31 March 1900 Inter City Football League	Third Lanark	2–0	Hearts	Cathkin Park

7 April 1900 Inter City Football League	Hearts	4–1	Rangers	Tynecastle Park

16 April 1900 Inter City Football League	Hibernian	1–1	Hearts	Easter Road

21 April 1900 Inter City Football League	Hearts	3–2	Celtic	Tynecastle Park

28 April 1900 Inter City Football League	Hearts	4–1	Queen's Park	Tynecastle Park

7 May 1900 Inter City Football League	Celtic	5–0	Hearts	Celtic Park

=== Scottish First Division ===
2 September 1899 Scottish First Division	Rangers	4–3	Hearts	Ibrox Park
				Attendance: 20,000

9 September 1899 Scottish First Division	St Bernard's	2–4	Hearts	New Logie Green
				Attendance: 6,000

16 September 1899 Scottish First Division	Hearts	3–0	Celtic	Tynecastle Park
				Attendance: 6,500

18 September 1899 Scottish First Division	Hearts	1–1	Rangers	Tynecastle Park
				Attendance: 15,500

23 September 1899 Scottish First Division	Hearts	1–0	Kilmarnock	Tynecastle Park
				Attendance: 5,000

30 September 1899 Scottish First Division	Celtic	0–2	Hearts	Celtic Park
				Attendance: 10,000

7 October 1899 Scottish First Division	Hearts	2–0	Third Lanark	Tynecastle Park
				Attendance: 4,500

14 October 1899 Scottish First Division	Hearts	5–0	St Bernard's	Tynecastle Park
				Attendance: 4,200

21 October 1899 Scottish First Division	Clyde	1–2	Hearts	Shawfield Stadium
				Attendance: 4,000

28 October 1899 Scottish First Division	Hibernian	1–0	Hearts	Easter Road
				Attendance: 9,000

4 November 1899 Scottish First Division	Hearts	3–2	Celtic	Tynecastle Park
				Attendance: 10,000

11 November 1899 Scottish First Division	Hearts	4–1	Dundee	Tynecastle Park
				Attendance: 2,500

18 November 1899 Scottish First Division	St Mirren	2–2	Hearts	St Mirren Park, Love Street
				Attendance: 3,000

25 November 1899 Scottish First Division	Hearts	1–3	Hibernian	Tynecastle Park
				Attendance: 7,500

9 December 1899 Scottish First Division	Hearts	4–1	Clyde	Tynecastle Park
				Attendance: 2,000

16 December 1899 Scottish First Division	Dundee	0–1	Hearts	Dens Park
				Attendance: 7,000

23 December 1899 Scottish First Division	Third Lanark	1–0	Hearts	Cathkin Park
				Attendance: 3,000

17 March 1900 Scottish First Division	Kilmarnock	2–1	Hearts	Rugby Park
				Attendance: 4,500

== See also ==
- List of Heart of Midlothian F.C. seasons
