= 1894–95 Heart of Midlothian F.C. season =

Heart of Midlothian
1894–95 season
- Stadium: Tynecastle Park
- Scottish First Division: 1st
- Scottish Cup: Semi-finalists

During the 1894–95 season Hearts competed in the Scottish First Division, the Scottish Cup and the East of Scotland Shield.

== Fixtures ==
=== Rosebery Charity Cup ===
15 May 1895 Rosebery Charity Cup SF	St Bernard's	3–7	Hearts	New Logie Green

29 May 1895 Rosebery Charity Cup Final	Leith Athletic	1–3	Hearts	Bank Park

=== Scottish Cup ===
24 November 1894 Scottish Cup R1	Rangers	1–2	Hearts	Ibrox Park
				Attendance: 12,000

15 December 1894 Scottish Cup R2	Abercorn	1–6	Hearts	Bank Park
				Attendance: 3,000

12 January 1895 Scottish Cup R3	Hearts	4–2	King's Park	Tynecastle Park
				Attendance: 3,000

9 March 1895 Scottish Cup SF	St Bernard's	0–0	Hearts	New Logie Green
				Attendance: 14,500

16 March 1895 Scottish Cup SF Replay	St Bernard's	1–0	Hearts	New Logie Green
				Attendance: 18,000

=== Edinburgh League ===
8 December 1894 Edinburgh Football League	Hibernian	1–2	Hearts	Easter Road

13 April 1895 Edinburgh Football League	Leith Athletic	2–3	Hearts	Bank Park

20 April 1895 Edinburgh Football League	Hibernian	2–1	Hearts	Easter Road

4 May 1895 Edinburgh Football League	St Bernard's	0–5	Hearts	Old Logie Green

11 May 1895 Edinburgh Football League	Hearts	5–1	Leith Athletic	Tynecastle Park

25 May 1895 Edinburgh Football League	Hearts	6–0	St Bernard's	Tynecastle Park

=== Scottish First Division ===
18 August 1894 Scottish First Division	Hearts	6–3	Third Lanark	Tynecastle Park
				Attendance: 5,500

1 September 1894 Scottish First Division	Hearts	1–0	St Mirren	Tynecastle Park
				Attendance: 5,000

8 September 1894 Scottish First Division	Third Lanark	0–3	Hearts	Cathkin Park
				Attendance: 8,000

15 September 1894 Scottish First Division	Hearts	3–1	Leith Athletic	Tynecastle Park
				Attendance: 6,500

29 September 1894 Scottish First Division	Dumbarton	1–4	Hearts	Boghead Park
				Attendance: 1,000

6 October 1894 Scottish First Division	Hearts	4–3	St Bernard's	Tynecastle Park
				Attendance: 7,500

13 October 1894 Scottish First Division	St Mirren	1–2	Hearts	St Mirren Park, Love Street

20 October 1894 Scottish First Division	Rangers	0–1	Hearts	Ibrox Park
				Attendance: 10,000

27 October 1894 Scottish First Division	Hearts	3–1	Dumbarton	Tynecastle Park
				Attendance: 5,500

3 November 1894 Scottish First Division	Celtic	0–2	Hearts	Celtic Park
				Attendance: 24,000

17 November 1894 Scottish First Division	Leith Athletic	1–4	Hearts	Bank Park
				Attendance: 6,000

1 December 1894 Scottish First Division	Hearts	2–4	Clyde	Tynecastle Park
				Attendance: 5,000

22 December 1894 Scottish First Division	Dundee	0–2	Hearts	Carolina Port
				Attendance: 4,000

19 January 1895 Scottish First Division	Hearts	0–0	Rangers	Tynecastle Park
				Attendance: 8,000

16 February 1895 Scottish First Division	Hearts	4–0	Celtic	Tynecastle Park
				Attendance: 8,000

23 March 1895 Scottish First Division	Clyde	3–2	Hearts	Barrowfield Park
				Attendance: 2,000

30 March 1895 Scottish First Division	Hearts	4–0	Dundee	Tynecastle Park
				Attendance: 4,500

6 April 1895 Scottish First Division	St Bernard's	0–3	Hearts	New Logie Green
				Attendance: 15,000

== See also ==
- List of Heart of Midlothian F.C. seasons
