= 1897–98 Heart of Midlothian F.C. season =

Heart of Midlothian
1897–98 season
- Stadium: Tynecastle Park
- Scottish First Division: 4th
- Scottish Cup: 3rd Round

During the 1897–98 season Hearts competed in the Scottish First Division, the Scottish Cup and the East of Scotland Shield.

== Fixtures ==
=== East of Scotland Shield ===
15 January 1898 East of Scotland Shield R1	Hearts	6–0	Armadale	Old Logie Green

29 January 1898 East of Scotland Shield SF	Hearts	6–2	Mossend Swifts	Easter Road

26 February 1898 East of Scotland Shield Final	Hearts	2–2	Leith Athletic	Old Logie Green

19 March 1898 East of Scotland Shield Final	Hearts	2–0	Leith Athletic	Old Logie Green

=== Rosebery Charity Cup ===
14 May 1898 Rosebery Charity Cup SF	Leith Athletic	1–2	Hearts	Bank Park

21 May 1898 Rosebery Charity Cup Final	Hibernian	1–6	Hearts	Easter Road

=== Scottish Cup ===
8 January 1898 Scottish Cup R1	Hearts	8–0	Lochee United	Tynecastle Park
				Attendance: 2,000

22 January 1898 Scottish Cup R2	Hearts	4–1	Morton	Tynecastle Park
				Attendance: 4,000

5 February 1898 Scottish Cup R3	Dundee	3–0	Hearts	Carolina Port
				Attendance: 7,000

=== East of Scotland League ===
12 February 1898 East of Scotland League	Hearts	2–1	Hibernian	Tynecastle Park

5 March 1898 East of Scotland League	Dundee	1–3	Hearts	Carolina Port

12 March 1898 East of Scotland League	St Bernard's	2–1	Hearts	Old Logie Green

26 March 1898 East of Scotland League	Hibernian	1–1	Hearts	Easter Road

2 April 1898 East of Scotland League	Hearts	3–1	St Bernard's	Tynecastle Park

9 April 1898 East of Scotland League	Leith Athletic	1–3	Hearts	Bank Park

30 April 1898 East of Scotland League	Hearts	3–0	Leith Athletic	Tynecastle Park

=== Scottish First Division ===
4 September 1897 Scottish First Division	Partick Thistle	3–2	Hearts	Meadowside
				Attendance: 7,000

11 September 1897 Scottish First Division	Hearts	0–0	Celtic	Tynecastle Park
				Attendance: 14,000

18 September 1897 Scottish First Division	Hibernian	1–1	Hearts	Easter Road
				Attendance: 14,000

20 September 1897 Scottish First Division	Hearts	2–2	Rangers	Tynecastle Park
				Attendance: 11,500

25 September 1897 Scottish First Division	Hearts	2–4	St Mirren	Tynecastle Park
				Attendance: 5,500

2 October 1897 Scottish First Division	Rangers	2–0	Hearts	Ibrox Park
				Attendance: 11,000

9 October 1897 Scottish First Division	Hearts	5–1	St Bernard's	Tynecastle Park
				Attendance: 5,000

16 October 1897 Scottish First Division	Dundee	1–6	Hearts	Carolina Port
				Attendance: 4,000

23 October 1897 Scottish First Division	Celtic	3–2	Hearts	Celtic Park
				Attendance: 17,000

30 October 1897 Scottish First Division	Hearts	2–0	Dundee	Tynecastle Park
				Attendance: 4,500

6 November 1897 Scottish First Division	Clyde	2–2	Hearts	Barrowfield Park
				Attendance: 3,000

13 November 1897 Scottish First Division	Hearts	2–3	Third Lanark	Tynecastle Park
				Attendance: 1,500

20 November 1897 Scottish First Division	St Bernard's	1–5	Hearts	New Logie Green
				Attendance: 4,000

27 November 1897 Scottish First Division	St Mirren	3–1	Hearts	St Mirren Park, Love Street
				Attendance: 7,000

4 December 1897 Scottish First Division	Hearts	8–1	Clyde	Tynecastle Park
				Attendance: 2,000

11 December 1897 Scottish First Division	Third Lanark	2–5	Hearts	Cathkin Park
				Attendance: 2,000

18 December 1897 Scottish First Division	Hearts	3–2	Hibernian	Tynecastle Park
				Attendance: 7,000

25 December 1897 Scottish First Division	Hearts	6–2	Partick Thistle	Tynecastle Park
				Attendance: 2,000

== See also ==
- List of Heart of Midlothian F.C. seasons
