= 1895–96 Heart of Midlothian F.C. season =

Heart of Midlothian
1895–96 season
- Stadium: Tynecastle Park
- Scottish First Division: 4th
- Scottish Cup: Winners

During the 1895–96 season Hearts competed in the Scottish First Division, the Scottish Cup and the East of Scotland Shield.

== Fixtures ==
=== Rosebery Charity Cup ===
6 May 1896 Rosebery Charity Cup SF	Hearts	2–0	Hibernian	Tynecastle Park

25 May 1896 Rosebery Charity Cup Final	Hearts	8–2	Leith Athletic	Tynecastle Park

=== Scottish Cup ===
11 January 1896 Scottish Cup R1	Blantyre	1–12	Hearts	Tynecastle Park
				Attendance: 500

1 February 1896 Scottish Cup R2	Ayr	1–5	Hearts	Somerset Park
				Attendance: 2,000

8 February 1896 Scottish Cup R3	Arbroath	0–4	Hearts	Gayfield Park
				Attendance: 6,000

22 February 1896 Scottish Cup SF	Hearts	1–0	St Bernard's	Tynecastle Park
				Attendance: 16,000

14 March 1896 Scottish Cup Final	Hearts	3–1	Hibernian	New Logie Green
				Attendance: 17,034

=== Cup Winners Challenge ===
29 April 1896 Cup Winners Challenge	Hearts	3–0	Sheffield Wednesday	Tynecastle Park

=== Edinburgh League ===
7 March 1896 Edinburgh Football League	St Bernard's	1–2	Hearts	Old Logie Green

21 March 1896 Edinburgh Football League	Hibernian	0–1	Hearts	Easter Road

4 April 1896 Edinburgh Football League	Hearts	4–2	St Bernard's	Tynecastle Park

20 April 1896 Edinburgh Football League	Hearts	7–1	Hibernian	Tynecastle Park

25 April 1896 Edinburgh Football League	Leith Athletic	1–5	Hearts	Bank Park

16 May 1896 Edinburgh Football League	Hearts	2–2	Leith Athletic	Tynecastle Park

=== Scottish First Division ===
17 August 1895 Scottish First Division	St Mirren	2–1	Hearts	St Mirren Park, Love Street
				Attendance: 8,000

24 August 1895 Scottish First Division	Clyde	1–2	Hearts	Barrowfield Park
				Attendance: 3,000

31 August 1895 Scottish First Division	Hearts	1–2	Rangers	Tynecastle Park
				Attendance: 8,000

7 September 1895 Scottish First Division	Hearts	3–0	Third Lanark	Tynecastle Park
				Attendance: 6,000

14 September 1895 Scottish First Division	Celtic	0–5	Hearts	Celtic Park
				Attendance: 18,000

21 September 1895 Scottish First Division	St Bernard's	0–5	Hearts	New Logie Green
				Attendance: 7,000

28 September 1895 Scottish First Division	Hearts	4–3	Hibernian	Tynecastle Park
				Attendance: 17,500

5 October 1895 Scottish First Division	Hearts	9–1	Clyde	Tynecastle Park
				Attendance: 5,000

12 October 1895 Scottish First Division	Dundee	5–0	Hearts	Carolina Port
				Attendance: 7,500

19 October 1895 Scottish First Division	Dumbarton	2–9	Hearts	Boghead Park
				Attendance: 1,200

26 October 1895 Scottish First Division	Hearts	5–1	St Mirren	Tynecastle Park
				Attendance: 3,500

2 November 1895 Scottish First Division	Hearts	2–0	St Mirren	Tynecastle Park
				Attendance: 7,000

23 November 1895 Scottish First Division	Hearts	1–4	Celtic	Tynecastle Park
				Attendance: 16,500

30 November 1895 Scottish First Division	Third Lanark	5–4	Hearts	Cathkin Park
				Attendance: 4,000

7 December 1895 Scottish First Division	Rangers	7–2	Hearts	Ibrox Park

14 December 1895 Scottish First Division	Hearts	6–0	St Bernard's	Tynecastle Park
				Attendance: 4,500

21 December 1895 Scottish First Division	Hibernian	3–2	Hearts	Easter Road
				Attendance: 4,500

15 February 1896 Scottish First Division	Hearts	7–0	Dumbarton	Tynecastle Park
				Attendance: 2,500

== See also ==
- List of Heart of Midlothian F.C. seasons
