= 1896–97 Heart of Midlothian F.C. season =

Heart of Midlothian
1896–97 season
- Stadium: Tynecastle Park
- Scottish First Division: 1st
- Scottish Cup: 2nd Round

During the 1896–97 season Hearts competed in the Scottish First Division, the Scottish Cup and the East of Scotland Shield.

== Fixtures ==
=== Rosebery Charity Cup ===
5 May 1897 Rosebery Charity Cup SF	Hearts	1–1	St Bernard's	Tynecastle Park

7 May 1897 Rosebery Charity Cup SF Replay	Hearts	4–1	St Bernard's	Tynecastle Park

11 May 1897 Rosebery Charity Cup Final	Hearts	0–3	Hibernian	Tynecastle Park

=== Scottish Cup ===
9 January 1897 Scottish Cup R1	Hearts	2–0	Clyde	Tynecastle Park
				Attendance: 2,000

6 February 1897 Scottish Cup R2	Third Lanark	5–2	Hearts	Cathkin Park
				Attendance: 12,000

=== Edinburgh League ===
4 January 1897 Edinburgh Football League	East Stirlingshire	1–1	Hearts	Merchiston Park

27 February 1897 Edinburgh Football League	Dundee	1–1	Hearts	Carolina Port

13 March 1897 Edinburgh Football League	Hibernian	5–1	Hearts	Easter Road

20 March 1897 Edinburgh Football League	Hearts	4–0	St Bernard's	Tynecastle Park

27 March 1897 Edinburgh Football League	Hearts	3–0	Leith Athletic	Tynecastle Park

3 April 1897 Edinburgh Football League	Hearts	3–2	Dundee	Tynecastle Park

10 April 1897 Edinburgh Football League	St Bernard's	0–1	Hearts	Old Logie Green

19 April 1897 Edinburgh Football League	Hearts	4–3	Hibernian	Tynecastle Park

1 May 1897 Edinburgh Football League	Hearts	8–0	East Stirlingshire	Tynecastle Park

8 May 1897 Edinburgh Football League	Leith Athletic	2–2	Hearts	Bank Park

=== Scottish First Division ===
15 August 1896 Scottish First Division	Dundee	0–5	Hearts	Carolina Port
				Attendance: 8,000

22 August 1896 Scottish First Division	Hearts	6–1	Abercorn	Tynecastle Park
				Attendance: 6,000

29 August 1896 Scottish First Division	Hearts	2–1	St Mirren	Tynecastle Park
				Attendance: 6,000

5 September 1896 Scottish First Division	Celtic	3–0	Hearts	Celtic Park
				Attendance: 25,000

12 September 1896 Scottish First Division	Rangers	5–0	Hearts	Ibrox Park
				Attendance: 14,000

19 September 1896 Scottish First Division	Hearts	2–2	Dundee	Tynecastle Park
				Attendance: 6,500

21 September 1896 Scottish First Division	Hearts	2–1	Rangers	Tynecastle Park
				Attendance: 6,000

26 September 1896 Scottish First Division	Hibernian	2–0	Hearts	Easter Road
				Attendance: 12,000

3 October 1896 Scottish First Division	St Bernard's	2–5	Hearts	New Logie Green
				Attendance: 7,500

17 October 1896 Scottish First Division	St Mirren	0–2	Hearts	St Mirren Park, Love Street
				Attendance: 3,000

24 October 1896 Scottish First Division	Hearts	1–1	Celtic	Tynecastle Park
				Attendance: 11,000

31 October 1896 Scottish First Division	Abercorn	0–1	Hearts	Underwood Park
				Attendance: 1,500

7 November 1896 Scottish First Division	Hearts	3–1	St Bernard's	Tynecastle Park
				Attendance: 3,000

21 November 1896 Scottish First Division	Hearts	2–1	Third Lanark	Tynecastle Park
				Attendance: 3,000

5 December 1896 Scottish First Division	Hearts	1–0	Hibernian	Tynecastle Park
				Attendance: 10,500

12 December 1896 Scottish First Division	Third Lanark	1–5	Hearts	Cathkin Park
				Attendance: 2,500

13 February 1897 Scottish First Division	Clyde	1–5	Hearts	Barrowfield Park
				Attendance: 3,000

20 February 1897 Scottish First Division	Hearts	5–0	Clyde	Tynecastle Park
				Attendance: 4,000

== See also ==
- List of Heart of Midlothian F.C. seasons
