= 1901–02 Heart of Midlothian F.C. season =

Heart of Midlothian
1901–02 season
- Manager: Peter Fairley
- Stadium: Tynecastle Park
- Scottish First Division: 3rd
- Scottish Cup: 3rd Round

During the 1901–02 season Hearts competed in the Scottish First Division, the Scottish Cup and the East of Scotland Shield.

== Fixtures ==
=== Glasgow Exhibition Cup ===
27 August 1901 Glasgow Exhibition Cup R1	Queen's Park	1–2	Hearts	Gilmorehill

5 September 1901 Glasgow Exhibition Cup SF	Celtic	2–1	Hearts	Gilmorehill

=== East of Scotland Shield ===
1 March 1902 East of Scotland Shield R1	Hearts	4–2	Dunfermline Athletic	Tynecastle Park

15 March 1902 East of Scotland Shield SF	Hearts	2–0	Bathgate	Tynecastle Park

29 March 1902 East of Scotland Shield Final	Hibernian	2–1	Hearts	Easter Road

=== Rosebery Charity Cup ===
17 May 1902 Rosebery Charity Cup SF	St Bernard's	2–6	Hearts	Royal Gymnasium Ground

24 May 1902 Rosebery Charity Cup Final	Hibernian	1–0	Hearts	Easter Road

=== Glasgow Charity Cup ===
19 May 1902 Glasgow Charity Cup R1	Celtic	3–1	Hearts	Celtic Park

=== Scottish Cup ===
11 January 1902 Scottish Cup R1	Cowdenbeath	0–0	Hearts	Cowdenbeath
				Attendance: 3,000

18 January 1902 Scottish Cup R1 Replay	Hearts	3–0	Cowdenbeath	Tynecastle Park
				Attendance: 7,000

25 January 1902 Scottish Cup R2	Hearts	4–1	Third Lanark	Tynecastle Park
				Attendance: 11,800

15 February 1902 Scottish Cup R3	Hearts	1–1	Celtic	Tynecastle Park
				Attendance: 14,000

22 February 1902 Scottish Cup R3 Replay	Cetic	2–1	Hearts	Celtic Park
				Attendance: 24,000

=== East of Scotland League ===
19 August 1901 East of Scotland League	St Bernard's	1–2	Hearts	Royal Gymnasium Ground

1 January 1902 East of Scotland League	Hearts	1–1	Hibernian	Tynecastle Park

4 January 1902 East of Scotland League	Dundee	1–0	Hearts	Dens Park

8 March 1902 East of Scotland League	Hibernian	2–0	Hearts	Easter Road

22 March 1902 East of Scotland League	Hearts	0–0	Dundee	Tynecastle Park

5 April 1902 East of Scotland League	Hearts	2–1	Leith Athletic	Tynecastle Park

14 April 1902 East of Scotland League	Hearts	2–1	St Bernard's	Tynecastle Park

12 May 1902 East of Scotland League	Leith Athletic	0–1	Hearts	Chancelot Park

=== Inter City League ===
28 December 1901 Inter City Football League	Hearts	2–2	Rangers	Tynecastle Park

31 March 1902 Inter City Football League	Celtic	2–3	Hearts	Celtic Park

12 April 1902 Inter City Football League	Hearts	4–1	Third Lanark	Tynecastle Park

19 April 1902 Inter City Football League	Rangers	0–2	Hearts	Ibrox Park

21 April 1902 Inter City Football League	Hearts	4–2	Celtic	Tynecastle Park

26 April 1902 Inter City Football League	Third Lanark	1–1	Hearts	Cathkin Park

3 May 1902 Inter City Football League	Queen's Park	1–2	Hearts	Hampden Park

10 May 1902 Inter City Football League	Hearts	3–2	Hibernian	Tynecastle Park

15 May 1902 Inter City Football League	Hibernian	2–3	Hearts	Easter Road

=== Scottish First Division ===
17 August 1901 Scottish First Division	Hearts	2–1	Dundee	Tynecastle Park
				Attendance: 5,000

24 August 1901 Scottish First Division	Rangers	2–1	Hearts	Ibrox Park
				Attendance: 17,000

31 August 1901 Scottish First Division	Hearts	3–1	Morton	Tynecastle Park
				Attendance: 7,000

7 September 1901 Scottish First Division	Third Lanark	2–0	Hearts	Cathkin Park
				Attendance: 7,300

14 September 1901 Scottish First Division	Hibernian	1–2	Hearts	Easter Road
				Attendance: 12,000

16 September 1901 Scottish First Division	Hearts	0–2	Rangers	Tynecastle Park
				Attendance: 9,000

21 September 1901 Scottish First Division	Hearts	3–0	Kilmarnock	Tynecastle Park
				Attendance: 6,000

28 September 1901 Scottish First Division	Hearts	1–1	Queen's Park	Tynecastle Park
				Attendance: 6,000

5 October 1901 Scottish First Division	St Mirren	1–2	Hearts	St Mirren Park, Love Street
				Attendance: 3,500

12 October 1901 Scottish First Division	Hearts	4–0	Dundee	Tynecastle Park
				Attendance: 5,000

19 October 1901 Scottish First Division	Kilmarnock	1–0	Hearts	Rugby Park
				Attendance: 4,000

26 October 1901 Scottish First Division	Queen's Park	2–1	Hearts	Hampden Park
				Attendance: 5,000

2 November 1901 Scottish First Division	Hearts	2–2	Celtic	Tynecastle Park
				Attendance: 12,000

9 November 1901 Scottish First Division	Hearts	4–1	Third Lanark	Tynecastle Park
				Attendance: 2,000

16 November 1901 Scottish First Division	Morton	1–3	Hearts	Cappielow Park
				Attendance: 4,000

23 November 1901 Scottish First Division	Hearts	2–0	St Mirren	Tynecastle Park
				Attendance: 6,000

30 November 1901 Scottish First Division	Celtic	1–2	Hearts	Celtic Park
				Attendance: 10,000

7 December 1901 Scottish First Division	Dundee	4–2	Hearts	Dens Park
				Attendance: 7,000

== See also ==
- List of Heart of Midlothian F.C. seasons
