= 1898–99 Heart of Midlothian F.C. season =

Heart of Midlothian
1898–99 season
- Stadium: Tynecastle Park
- Scottish First Division: 2nd
- Scottish Cup: 1st Round

During the 1898–99 season Hearts competed in the Scottish First Division, the Scottish Cup and the East of Scotland Shield.

== Fixtures ==
=== East of Scotland Shield ===
11 February 1899 East of Scotland Shield R1	St Bernard's	1–1	Hearts	Old Logie Green

18 February 1899 East of Scotland Shield R1 Replay	Hearts	5–3	St Bernard's	Tynecastle Park

4 March 1899 East of Scotland Shield SF	Hearts	3–1	Lochgelly United	Tynecastle Park

18 March 1899 East of Scotland Shield Final	Hibernian	0–1	Hearts	Easter Road

=== Rosebery Charity Cup ===
8 May 1899 Rosebery Charity Cup SF	Hibernian	2–3	Hearts	Easter Road

27 May 1899 Rosebery Charity Cup Final	Leith Athletic	1–0	Hearts	Bank Park

=== Scottish Cup ===
14 January 1899 Scottish Cup R1	Rangers	4–1	Hearts	Ibrox Park
				Attendance: 25,612

=== East of Scotland League ===
4 February 1899 East of Scotland League	Hearts	4–1	Raith Rovers	Tynecastle Park

25 February 1899 East of Scotland League	Dundee	0–3	Hearts	Carolina Port

11 March 1899 East of Scotland League	Leith Athletic	3–2	Hearts	Bank Park

1 April 1899 East of Scotland League	Hibernian	1–1	Hearts	Easter Road

3 April 1899 East of Scotland League	Raith Rovers	2–3	Hearts	Stark's Park

8 April 1899 East of Scotland League	Hearts	4–2	Leith Athletic	Tynecastle Park

15 April 1899 East of Scotland League	St Bernard's	0–2	Hearts	Old Logie Green

22 April 1899 East of Scotland League	Hearts	2–1	St Bernard's	Tynecastle Park

29 April 1899 East of Scotland League	Hearts	3–1	Hibernian	Tynecastle Park

13 May 1899 East of Scotland League	Hearts	4–2	Dundee	Tynecastle Park

=== Scottish First Division ===
3 September 1898 Scottish First Division	Hearts	2–3	Rangers	Tynecastle Park
				Attendance: 17,500

10 September 1898 Scottish First Division	St Mirren	2–3	Hearts	St Mirren Park, Love Street
				Attendance: 4,000

17 September 1898 Scottish First Division	St Bernard's	1–3	Hearts	New Logie Green
				Attendance: 6,000

19 September 1898 Scottish First Division	Hearts	2–2	Celtic	Tynecastle Park
				Attendance: 13,500

24 September 1898 Scottish First Division	Hearts	4–0	Clyde	Tynecastle Park
				Attendance: 4,500

1 October 1898 Scottish First Division	Rangers	3–1	Hearts	Ibrox Park
				Attendance: 5,000

8 October 1898 Scottish First Division	Hearts	4–0	Dundee	Tynecastle Park
				Attendance: 14,000

15 October 1898 Scottish First Division	Hearts	5–1	Partick Thistle	Tynecastle Park
				Attendance: 3,000

22 October 1898 Scottish First Division	Clyde	3–3	Hearts	Shawfield Stadium
				Attendance: 4,000

29 October 1898 Scottish First Division	Hibernian	1–5	Hearts	Easter Road
				Attendance: 11,000

5 November 1898 Scottish First Division	Hearts	3–1	St Bernard's	Tynecastle Park
				Attendance: 6,000

12 November 1898 Scottish First Division	Hearts	2–1	Third Lanark	Tynecastle Park
				Attendance: 3,500

26 November 1898 Scottish First Division	Hearts	6–3	Dundee	Tynecastle Park
				Attendance: 1,500

3 December 1898 Scottish First Division	Dundee	2–5	Hearts	Carolina Port
				Attendance: 2,000

10 December 1898 Scottish First Division	Third Lanark	2–1	Hearts	Cathkin Park
				Attendance: 3,000

17 December 1898 Scottish First Division	Celtic	3–2	Hearts	Celtic Park
				Attendance: 6,000

24 December 1898 Scottish First Division	Hearts	4–2	St Mirren	Tynecastle Park
				Attendance: 5,000

7 January 1899 Scottish First Division	Partick Thistle	0–1	Hearts	Meadowside
				Attendance: 2,000

== See also ==
- List of Heart of Midlothian F.C. seasons
