= 1902–03 Heart of Midlothian F.C. season =

Heart of Midlothian
1902–03 season
- Manager: Peter Fairley
- Stadium: Tynecastle Park
- Scottish First Division: 4th
- Scottish Cup: Finalists

During the 1902–03 season Hearts competed in the Scottish First Division, the Scottish Cup and the East of Scotland Shield.

== Fixtures ==
=== East of Scotland Shield ===
4 April 1903 East of Scotland Shield R1	Hearts	1–2	Leith Athletic	Easter Road

=== Rosebery Charity Cup ===
16 May 1903 Rosebery Charity Cup SF	Hearts	1–3	Leith Athletic	Easter Road

=== Scottish Cup ===
10 January 1903 Scottish Cup R1	Clyde	3–2	Hearts	Shawfield Stadium
				Attendance: 2,000

24 January 1903 Scottish Cup R2	Ayr	2–4	Hearts	Somerset Park
				Attendance: 4,000

21 February 1903 Scottish Cup R3	Hearts	2–1	Third Lanark	Tynecastle Park
				Attendance: 12,000

28 February 1903 Scottish Cup SF	Dundee	0–0	Hearts	Dens Park
				Attendance: 24,000

7 March 1903 Scottish Cup SF Replay	Hearts	1–0	Dundee	Tynecastle Park
				Attendance: 32,000

11 April 1903 Scottish Cup Final	Rangers	1–1	Hearts	Celtic Park
				Attendance: 28,000

18 April 1903 Scottish Cup Final Replay	Rangers	0–0	Hearts	Celtic Park
				Attendance: 16,000

25 April 1903 Scottish Cup Final 2nd Replay	Rangers	2–0	Hearts	Celtic Park
				Attendance: 32,000

=== East of Scotland League ===
15 August 1902 East of Scotland League	Hearts	2–1	Hibernian	Tynecastle Park

18 August 1902 East of Scotland League	Hearts	1–0	St Bernard's	Tynecastle Park

1 January 1903 East of Scotland League	Hibernian	0–1	Hearts	Easter Road

7 February 1903 East of Scotland League	Hearts	3–0	Leith Athletic	Tynecastle Park

6 April 1903 East of Scotland League	Raith Rovers	0–4	Hearts	Stark's Park

2 May 1903 East of Scotland League	St Bernard's	1–1	Hearts	Royal Gymnasium Ground

4 May 1903 East of Scotland League	Leith Athletic	1–2	Hearts	Chancelot Park

9 May 1903 East of Scotland League	Hearts	4–1	Dundee	Tynecastle Park

11 May 1903 East of Scotland League	Hearts	4–1	Raith Rovers	Tynecastle Park

=== Inter City League ===
17 January 1903 Inter City Football League	Hibernian	0–0	Hearts	Easter Road

31 January 1903 Inter City Football League	Rangers	4–4	Hearts	Ibrox Park

14 February 1903 Inter City Football League	Hearts	4–1	Partick Thistle	Tynecastle Park

14 March 1903 Inter City Football League	Hearts	4–2	Queen's Park	Tynecastle Park

21 March 1903 Inter City Football League	Hearts	2–0	Third Lanark	Tynecastle Park

28 March 1903 Inter City Football League	Hearts	2–0	St Mirren	Tynecastle Park

20 April 1903 Inter City Football League	Hearts	3–0	Celtic	Tynecastle Park

13 May 1903 Inter City Football League	Hearts	1–2	Dundee	Tynecastle Park

=== Scottish First Division ===
16 August 1902 Scottish First Division	Morton	3–2	Hearts	Cappielow Park
				Attendance: 4,000

23 August 1902 Scottish First Division	Hearts	0–2	Dundee	Tynecastle Park
				Attendance: 7,000

30 August 1902 Scottish First Division	St Mirren	1–1	Hearts	St Mirren Park, Love Street
				Attendance: 5,000

6 September 1902 Scottish First Division	Hearts	2–1	Rangers	Tynecastle Park
				Attendance: 11,000

13 September 1902 Scottish First Division	Hibernian	0–0	Hearts	Easter Road
				Attendance: 13,000

15 September 1902 Scottish First Division	Hearts	1–2	Celtic	Tynecastle Park
				Attendance: 9,000

20 September 1902 Scottish First Division	Hearts	4–0	Queenb's Park	Tynecastle Park
				Attendance: 8,000

27 September 1902 Scottish First Division	Partick Thistle	2–2	Hearts	Meadowside
				Attendance: 3,000

29 September 1902 Scottish First Division	Celtic	2–2	Hearts	Celtic Park
				Attendance: 14,000

4 October 1902 Scottish First Division	Rangers	2–1	Hearts	Ibrox Park
				Attendance: 11,000

11 October 1902 Scottish First Division	Hearts	1–1	Hibernian	Tynecastle Park
				Attendance: 14,500

18 October 1902 Scottish First Division	Dundee	0–1	Hearts	Dens Park
				Attendance: 12,800

25 October 1902 Scottish First Division	Hearts	3–1	Port Glasgow Athletic	Tynecastle Park
				Attendance: 4,000

1 November 1902 Scottish First Division	Queen's Park	2–5	Hearts	Hampden Park
				Attendance: 7,000

8 November 1902 Scottish First Division	Hearts	1–3	St Mirren	Tynecastle Park
				Attendance: 3,500

15 November 1902 Scottish First Division	Third Lanark	0–3	Hearts	Cathkin Park
				Attendance: 5,000

22 November 1902 Scottish First Division	Kilmarnock	1–3	Hearts	Rugby Park
				Attendance: 3,000

29 November 1902 Scottish First Division	Hearts	4–2	Partick Thistle	Tynecastle Park
				Attendance: 4,000

6 December 1903 Scottish First Division	Hearts	1–1	Kilmarnock	Tynecastle Park
				Attendance: 2,500

20 December 1902 Scottish First Division	Port Glasgow Athletic	0–3	Hearts	Clune Park
				Attendance: 3,000

27 December 1922 Scottish First Division	Hearts	3–0	Morton	Tynecastle Park
				Attendance: 2,000

3 January 1903 Scottish First Division	Hearts	3–1	Third Lanark	Tynecastle Park
				Attendance: 5,000

== See also ==
- List of Heart of Midlothian F.C. seasons
