= 1894–95 Celtic F.C. season =

Celtic
1895–96 season
- Stadium: Celtic Park
- Scottish First Division: 2nd
- Scottish Cup: Third round

1894–95 was the seventh season of football for Celtic, who competed in the Scottish First Division. They failed to win any major domestic honour after having won either the league or the Scottish Cup in the previous three seasons. However, they won both the Glasgow Cup and the Glasgow Charity Cup.

== Competitions ==
=== Scottish First Division ===
==== League table ====
Pos	Team	Pld	W	D	L	GF	GA	GD	Pts	Qualification or relegation
1	Heart of Midlothian (C)	18	15	1	2	50	18	+32	31	Champions
2	Celtic	18	11	4	3	50	29	+21	26	
3	Rangers	18	10	2	6	41	26	+15	22	
4	Third Lanark	18	10	1	7	51	39	+12	21	
5	St Mirren	18	9	1	8	34	34	0	19	

Source: "1894-1895 Division 1 - SPFL Archive". SPFL.
Rules for classification: Teams finish equal if level on points. Points system: 2 points for a win, 1 point for a draw, 0 points for a loss
(C) Champions

==== Matches ====
11 August 1894 First Division	Dundee	1–1	Celtic	Dundee
				Stadium: Carolina Port; Attendance: 9,000

18 August 1894 First Division	Celtic	5–2	St Bernard's	Glasgow
				Stadium: Celtic Park; Attendance: 5,000

25 August 1894 First Division	Third Lanark	2–1	Celtic	Glasgow
				Stadium: Cathkin Park; Attendance: 6,000

8 September 1894 First Division	St Mirren	0–3	Celtic	Paisley
				Stadium: St Mirren Park, Love Street; Attendance: 8,000

22 September 1894 First Division	Celtic	5–3	Rangers	Glasgow
				Stadium: Celtic Park; Attendance: 16,000

13 October 1894 First Division	Clyde	2–4	Celtic	Glasgow
				Stadium: Barrowfield Park; Attendance: 4,000

20 October 1894 First Division	Celtic	6–0	Dumbarton	Glasgow
				Stadium: Celtic Park; Attendance: 2,000

3 November 1894 First Division	Celtic	0–2	Hearts	Glasgow
				Stadium: Celtic Park; Attendance: 24,000

10 November 1894 First Division	St Bernard's	0–2	Celtic	Edinburgh
				Stadium: New Logie Green; Attendance: 8,000

22 December 1894 First Division	Celtic	2–2	St Mirren	Glasgow
				Stadium: Celtic Park; Attendance: 6,000

16 February 1895 First Division	Hearts	4–0	Celtic	Edinburgh
				Stadium: Tynecastle Park; Attendance: 8,000

23 February 1895 First Division	Celtic	4–4	Third Lanark	Glasgow
				Stadium: Celtic Park; Attendance: 5,000

9 March 1895 First Division	Dumbarton	0–2	Celtic	Dumbarton
				Stadium: Boghead Park; Attendance: 4,000

16 March 1895 First Division	Celtic	4–0	Leith Athletic	Glasgow
				Stadium: Celtic Park; Attendance: 2,000

23 March 1895 First Division	Rangers	1–1	Celtic	Glasgow
				Stadium: Ibrox Park; Attendance: 5,000

30 March 1895 First Division	Leith Athletic	5–6	Celtic	Leith
				Stadium: Bank Park; Attendance: 2,500

27 April 1895 First Division	Celtic	2–0	Clyde	Glasgow
				Stadium: Celtic Park; Attendance: 5,000

4 May 1895 First Division	Celtic	2–1	Dundee	Glasgow
				Stadium: Celtic Park; Attendance: 6,000

=== Scottish Cup ===
24 November 1894 First round	Celtic	4–1	Queen's Park	Glasgow
				Stadium: Celtic Park; Attendance: 15,000

15 December 1894 Second round	Hibernian	2–0	Celtic	Edinburgh
				Stadium: Easter Road; Attendance: 3,000

29 December 1894 Second round replay	Hibernian	0–2	Celtic	Edinburgh
				Stadium: Easter Road; Attendance: 3,000

19 January 1895 Third round	Dundee	1–0	Celtic	Dundee
				Stadium: Carolina Port; Attendance: 12,000
