= 1904–05 Heart of Midlothian F.C. season =

Heart of Midlothian
1904–05 season
- Manager: William Waugh
- Stadium: Tynecastle Park
- Scottish First Division: 7th
- Scottish Cup: 2nd Round

During the 1904–05 season Hearts competed in the Scottish First Division, the Scottish Cup and the East of Scotland Shield.

== Fixtures ==
=== East of Scotland Shield ===
| 10 September 1904 East of Scotland Shield SF | Hearts | 1–1 | Leith Athletic | Tynecastle Park |

| 17 December 1904 East of Scotland Shield SF Replay | Leith Athletic | 1–2 | Hearts | Old Logie Green |

| 15 April 1905 East of Scotland Shield Final | Hearts | 2–2 | Hibernian | Tynecastle Park |

| 22 April 1905 East of Scotland Shield Final Replay | Hearts | 0–1 | Hibernian | Tynecastle Park |

=== Rosebery Charity Cup ===
| 20 May 1905 Rosebery Charity Cup SF | Hearts | 2–1 | St Bernard's | Tynecastle Park |

| 27 May 1905 Rosebery Charity Cup Final | Hearts | 5–0 | Leith Athletic | Tynecastle Park |

=== East of Scotland Cup ===
| 6 May 1905 East of Scotland Cup SF | Hibernian | 1–1 | Hearts | Easter Road |

| 11 May 1905 East of Scotland Cup Semi-Final Replay | Hearts | 2–1 | Hibernian | Tynecastle Park |

| 15 May 1905 East of Scotland Cup Final | Hearts | 3–0 | Leith Athletic | Tynecastle Park |

=== Scottish Cup ===
| 28 January 1905 Scottish Cup R1 | Dundee | 1–3 | Hearts | Dens Park |
| | | | | Attendance: 14,000 |

| 11 February 1905 Scottish Cup R2 | St Mirren | 2–1 | Hearts | St Mirren Park, Love Street |
| | | | | Attendance: 17,924 |

=== East of Scotland League ===
| 15 August 1904 East of Scotland League | Hearts | 2–0 | Hibernian | Tynecastle Park |

| 23 August 1904 East of Scotland League | Hearts | 1–2 | Falkirk | Tynecastle Park |

| 5 September 1904 East of Scotland League | Falkirk | 1–2 | Hearts | Brockville Park |

| 8 October 1904 East of Scotland League | Hibernian | 2–2 | Hearts | Easter Road |

| 4 January 1905 East of Scotland League | Hearts | 0–0 | Dundee | Tynecastle Park |

| 25 March 1905 East of Scotland League | Hearts | 4–0 | Leith Athletic | Tynecastle Park |

| 29 April 1905 East of Scotland League | Hearts | 4–1 | St Bernard's | Tynecastle Park |

| 1 May 1905 East of Scotland League | Aberdeen | 3–1 | Hearts | Pittodrie Park |

| 8 May 1905 East of Scotland League | St Bernard's | 1–2 | Hearts | Royal Gymnasium Ground |

| 10 May 1905 East of Scotland League | Hearts | 4–1 | Aberdeen | Tynecastle Park |

| 13 May 1905 East of Scotland League | Leith Athletic | 1–2 | Hearts | Old Logie Green |

=== Inter City League ===
| 21 January 1905 Inter City Football League | Hearts | 3–3 | St Mirren | Tynecastle Park |

| 18 March 1905 Inter City Football League | Hearts | 1–1 | Airdrieonians | Tynecastle Park |

| 1 April 1905 Inter City Football League | Airdrieonians | 3–1 | Hearts | Broomfield Park |

| 10 April 1905 Inter City Football League | Dundee | 3–0 | Hearts | Dens Park |

=== Scottish First Division ===
| 20 August 1904 Scottish First Division | Kilmarnock | 3–2 | Hearts | Tynecastle Park |
| | | | | Attendance: 4,500 |

| 27 August 1904 Scottish First Division | Hearts | 4–1 | Third Lanark | Tynecastle Park |
| | | | | Attendance: 11,000 |

| 3 September 1904 Scottish First Division | Celtic | 1–1 | Hearts | Celtic Park |
| | | | | Attendance: 19,000 |

| 17 September 1904 Scottish First Division | Motherwell | 2–4 | Hearts | Fir Park |
| | | | | Attendance: 6,000 |

| 19 September 1904 Scottish First Division | Hearts | 2–0 | Celtic | Tynecastle Park |
| | | | | Attendance: 10,000 |

| 24 September 1904 Scottish First Division | Airdrieonians | 3–2 | Hearts | Broomfield Park |
| | | | | Attendance: 10,500 |

| 26 September 1904 Scottish First Division | Rangers | 1–1 | Hearts | Ibrox Park |
| | | | | Attendance: 20,188 |

| 1 October 1904 Scottish First Division | Hearts | 0–1 | Partick Thistle | Tynecastle Park |
| | | | | Attendance: 5,500 |

| 15 October 1904 Scottish First Division | Partick Thistle | 2–1 | Hearts | Meadowside |
| | | | | Attendance: 4,000 |

| 22 October 1904 Scottish First Division | Hearts | 3–1 | St Mirren | Tynecastle Park |
| | | | | Attendance: 6,000 |

| 29 October 1904 Scottish First Division | Hibernian | 3–0 | Hearts | Easter Road |
| | | | | Attendance: 8,000 |

| 5 November 1904 Scottish First Division | Hearts | 0–5 | Rangers | Tynecastle Park |
| | | | | Attendance: 12,500 |

| 12 November 1904 Scottish First Division | Dundee | 2–0 | Hearts | Dens Park |
| | | | | Attendance: 7,300 |

| 19 November 1904 Scottish First Division | Hearts | 2–0 | Port Glasgow Athletic | Tynecastle Park |
| | | | | Attendance: 3,500 |

| 26 November 1904 Scottish First Division | Third Lanark | 7–1 | Hearts | Cathkin Park |
| | | | | Attendance: 1,000 |

| 3 December 1904 Scottish First Division | Hearts | 6–0 | Airdrieonians | Tynecastle Park |
| | | | | Attendance: 5,000 |

| 10 December 1904 Scottish First Division | St Mirren | 1–1 | Hearts | St Mirren Park, Love Street |
| | | | | Attendance: 4,000 |

| 24 December 1904 Scottish First Division | Port Glasgow Athletic | 3–0 | Hearts | Clune Park |
| | | | | Attendance: 3,000 |

| 31 December 1904 Scottish First Division | Hearts | 4–1 | Motherwell | Tynecastle Park |
| | | | | Attendance: 3,000 |

| 2 January 1905 Scottish First Division | Hearts | 1–0 | Hibernian | Tynecastle Park |
| | | | | Attendance: 9,000 |

| 7 January 1905 Scottish First Division | Hearts | 1–3 | Kilmarnock | Tynecastle Park |
| | | | | Attendance: 4,500 |

| 4 February 1905 Scottish First Division | Queen's Park | 2–0 | Hearts | Hampden Park |
| | | | | Attendance: 4,000 |

| 18 February 1905 Scottish First Division | Morton | 1–0 | Hearts | Cappielow Park |
| | | | | Attendance: 1,000 |

| 25 February 1905 Scottish First Division | Hearts | 3–1 | Dundee | Tynecastle Park |
| | | | | Attendance: 4,500 |

| 4 March 1905 Scottish First Division | Hearts | 2–0 | Morton | Tynecastle Park |
| | | | | Attendance: 3,000 |

== See also ==
- List of Heart of Midlothian F.C. seasons
