= 1903–04 Heart of Midlothian F.C. season =

Heart of Midlothian
1903–04 season
- Manager: William Waugh
- Stadium: Tynecastle Park
- Scottish First Division: 2nd
- Scottish Cup: 1st Round

During the 1903–04 season Hearts competed in the Scottish First Division, the Scottish Cup and the East of Scotland Shield.

== Fixtures ==
=== East of Scotland Shield ===
12 December 1903 East of Scotland Shield SF	Hearts	2–2	Leith Athletic	Easter Road

30 April 1904 East of Scotland Shield SF Replay	Hearts	1–0	Leith Athletic	Royal Gymnasium Ground

14 May 1904 East of Scotland Shield Final	St Bernard's	2–7	Hearts	Old Logie Green

=== Rosebery Charity Cup ===
23 May 1904 Rosebery Charity Cup SF	Hearts	3–0	Leith Athletic	Tynecastle Park

30 May 1904 Rosebery Charity Cup Final	Hearts	3–0	Hibernian	Tynecastle Park

=== City Cup ===
1 January 1904 City Cup First Leg	Hearts	0–0	Hibernian	Tynecastle Park

3 May 1904 City Cup Second Leg	Hibernian	1–5	Hearts	Easter Road

=== Scottish Cup ===
23 January 1904 Scottish Cup R1	Rangers	3–2	Hearts	Ibrox Park
				Attendance: 30,000

=== East of Scotland League ===
8 September 1903 East of Scotland League	Falkirk	1–5	Hearts	Brockville Park

21 September 1903 East of Scotland League	Hibernian	0–1	Hearts	Easter Road

8 September 1903 East of Scotland League	Hearts	2–0	Hibernian	Tynecastle Park

7 November 1903 East of Scotland League	Hearts	2–0	St Bernard's	Tynecastle Park

12 March 1904 East of Scotland League	Hearts	3–0	Leith Athletic	Tynecastle Park

18 April 1904 East of Scotland League	Hearts	6–1	Dundee	Tynecastle Park

=== Inter City League ===
19 March 1904 Inter City Football League	Hearts	1–0	Rangers	Tynecastle Park

26 March 1904 Inter City Football League	Hearts	4–0	Partick Thistle	Tynecastle Park

9 April 1904 Inter City Football League	Hearts	3–2	Third Lanark	Tynecastle Park

11 April 1904 Inter City Football League	Dundee	1–0	Hearts	Dens Park

16 April 1904 Inter City Football League	Hearts	1–0	Queen's Park	Tynecastle Park

23 April 1904 Inter City Football League	Hearts	2–1	St Mirren	Tynecastle Park

7 May 1904 Inter City Football League	Hearts	1–1	Hibernian	Tynecastle Park

=== Scottish First Division ===
15 August 1903 Scottish First Division	Hearts	5–1	St Mirren	Tynecastle Park
				Attendance: 8,500

22 August 1903 Scottish First Division	Third Lanark	2–1	Hearts	Hampden Park
				Attendance: 12,500

29 August 1903 Scottish First Division	Hearts	4–2	Dundee	Tynecastle Park
				Attendance: 14,000

5 September 1903 Scottish First Division	Partick Thistle	1–1	Hearts	Meadowside
				Attendance: 7,000

12 September 1903 Scottish First Division	Hearts	5–0	Motherwell	Tynecastle Park
				Attendance: 6,000

19 September 1903 Scottish First Division	Rangers	5–1	Hearts	Ibrox Park
				Attendance: 9,000

26 September 1903 Scottish First Division	Hearts	2–1	Kilmarnock	Tynecastle Park
				Attendance: 6,500

10 October 1903 Scottish First Division	Hearts	2–0	Hibernian	Tynecastle Park
				Attendance: 12,500

17 October 1903 Scottish First Division	Dundee	2–1	Hearts	Dens Park
				Attendance: 11,720

24 October 1903 Scottish First Division	Celtic	4–0	Hearts	Celtic Park
				Attendance: 5,000

31 October 1903 Scottish First Division	Hearts	4–1	Partick Thistle	Tynecastle Park
				Attendance: 6,000

14 November 1903 Scottish First Division	Hearts	2–0	Port Glasgow Athletic	Tynecastle Park
				Attendance: 32,000

21 November 1903 Scottish First Division	Port Glasgow Athletic	1–1	Hearts	Clune Park
				Attendance: 3,000

28 November 1903 Scottish First Division	Motherwell	0–4	Hearts	Fir Park
				Attendance: 3,000

19 December 1903 Scottish First Division	Hearts	1–0	Morton	Tynecastle Park
				Attendance: 3,000

26 December 1903 Scottish First Division	Airdrieonians	1–2	Hearts	Tynecastle Park
				Attendance: 3,000

2 January 1904 Scottish First Division	Hearts	3–1	Queen's Park	Tynecastle Park
				Attendance: 8,000

9 January 1904 Scottish First Division	Morton	1–2	Hearts	Cappielow Park
				Attendance: 3,000

16 January 1904 Scottish First Division	St Mirren	3–0	Hearts	St Mirren Park, Love Street
				Attendance: 4,000

30 January 1904 Scottish First Division	Hearts	2–1	Rangers	Tynecastle Park
				Attendance: 12,500

6 February 1904 Scottish First Division	Queen's Park	2–2	Hearts	Hampden Park
				Attendance: 4,000

13 February 1904 Scottish First Division	Hearts	4–1	Third Lanark	Tynecastle Park
				Attendance: 8,500

20 February 1904 Scottish First Division	Hibernian	2–4	Hearts	Easter Road
				Attendance: 4,000

27 February 1904 Scottish First Division	Hearts	5–0	Airdrieonians	Tynecastle Park
				Attendance: 4,500

5 March 1904 Scottish First Division	Kilmarnock	2–3	Hearts	Rugby Park
				Attendance: 2,000

2 April 1904 Scottish First Division	Hearts	2–1	Celtic	Tynecastle Park
				Attendance: 11,000

== See also ==
- List of Heart of Midlothian F.C. seasons
