= 1895–96 Hibernian F.C. season =

Hibernian
1895–96 season
- Scottish First Division: 3rd
- Scottish Cup: Finalists
- Average home league attendance: 13,721 (down 618)

During the 1895–96 season Hibernian, a football club based in Edinburgh, finished third out of 10 clubs in the Scottish First Division.

== Scottish First Division ==
Match Day	Date	Opponent	H/A	Score	Hibernian Scorer(s)	Attendance
1	17 August	Third Lanark	A	7–2		5,000
2	24 August	Celtic	H	4–2		10,000
3	31 August	Dundee	A	2–2		6,000
4	7 September	St Mirren	A	3–1		5,000
5	14 September	Clyde	H	4–3		3,000
6	21 September	Dumbarton	H	7–2		1,500
7	28 September	Heart of Midlothian	A	3–4		17,500
8	5 October	Celtic	A	1–3		20,000
9	12 October	St Mirren	H	5–1		3,000
10	19 October	St Bernard's	A	5–2		6,000
11	26 October	Rangers	H	1–1		8,000
12	9 November	Dumbarton	A	3–1		
13	23 November	Rangers	A	0–4		6,000
14	30 November	St Bernard's	H	2–3		5,000
15	7 December	Third Lanark	H	2–5		2,000
16	21 December	Heart of Midlothian	H	3–2		4,500
17	18 January	Dundee	H	3–1		4,000
18	1 February	Clyde	A	3–0		

=== Final League table ===
P	Team	Pld	W	D	L	GF	GA	GD	Pts
2	Rangers	18	11	4	3	57	39	18	26
3	Hibernian	18	11	2	5	58	39	19	24
4	Heart of Midlothian	18	11	0	7	68	36	32	22

=== Scottish Cup ===
Round	Date	Opponent	H/A	Score	Hibernian Scorer(s)	Attendance
R1	9 January	East Stirlingshire	A	3–2		3,000
R2	8 February	Raith Rovers	H	6–1		3,000
R3	15 February	Rangers	A	3–2		18,000
SF	22 February	Renton	H	2–1		12,000
F	14 March	Heart of Midlothian	N	1–3		17,034

== See also ==
- List of Hibernian F.C. seasons
