= 1896–97 Celtic F.C. season =

Celtic 1896–97 football season

Celtic
1896–97 season
- Manager: Willie Maley
- Stadium: Celtic Park
- Scottish First Division: 4th
- Scottish Cup: First round

1896–97 was Celtic Football Club's ninth season of competitive association football. They competed in the Scottish First Division.

It was the first season in the club's history in which they didn't win any trophies, neither national nor local, such as the Glasgow Cup or Glasgow Charity Cup. It was also the last season played by James Kelly, Celtic's first ever captain.

== Competitions ==
=== Scottish First Division ===
==== League table ====
Pos	Team	Pld	W	D	L	GF	GA	GD	Pts
2	Hibernian	18	12	2	4	50	20	+30	26
3	Rangers	18	11	3	4	64	30	+34	25
4	Celtic	18	10	4	4	42	18	+24	24
5	Dundee	18	10	2	6	38	30	+8	22
6	St Mirren	18	9	1	8	38	29	+9	19

Source: statto.com
Rules for classification: Teams finish equal if level on points. Points system: 2 points for a win, 1 point for a draw, 0 points for a loss

==== Matches ====
15 August 1896 First Division	Hibernian	3–1	Celtic	Edinburgh
				Stadium: Easter Road; Attendance: 12,000

17 August 1896 First Division	Clyde	2–7	Celtic	Glasgow
				Stadium: Barrowfield Park; Attendance: 3,000

22 August 1896 First Division	Celtic	2–0	St Bernard's	Glasgow
				Stadium: Celtic Park; Attendance: 8,000

29 August 1896 First Division	Abercorn	0–6	Celtic	Abercorn
				Stadium: Underwood Park; Attendance: 4,500

5 September 1896 First Division	Celtic	3–0	Hearts	Glasgow
				Stadium: Celtic Park; Attendance: 25,000

12 September 1896 First Division	St Bernard's	1–2	Celtic	Edinburgh
				Stadium: New Logie Green; Attendance: 8,000

26 September 1896 First Division	Celtic	2–1	St Mirren	Glasgow
				Stadium: Celtic Park; Attendance: 6,000

3 October 1896 First Division	Dundee	2–2	Celtic	Dundee
				Stadium: Carolina Port; Attendance: 17,000

10 October 1896 First Division	Celtic	1–1	Rangers	Glasgow
				Stadium: Celtic Park; Attendance: 24,000

17 October 1896 First Division	Celtic	2–0	Third Lanark	Glasgow
				Stadium: Celtic Park; Attendance: 10,000

24 October 1896 First Division	Hearts	1–1	Celtic	Edinburgh
				Stadium: Tynecastle Park; Attendance: 11,000

7 November 1896 First Division	Celtic	5–0	Abercorn	Glasgow
				Stadium: Celtic Park; Attendance: 1,000

28 November 1896 First Division	Celtic	1–1	Hibernian	Glasgow
				Stadium: Celtic Park; Attendance: 15,000

5 December 1896 First Division	Third Lanark	0–3	Celtic	Glasgow
				Stadium: Cathkin Park; Attendance: 4,000

12 December 1896 First Division	Celtic	4–1	Clyde	Glasgow
				Stadium: Celtic Park; Attendance: 5,000

19 December 1896 First Division	Rangers	2–0	Celtic	Glasgow
				Stadium: Ibrox Park; Attendance: 15,000

20 February 1897 First Division	Celtic	0–1	Dundee	Glasgow
				Stadium: Celtic Park; Attendance: 8,000

13 March 1897 First Division	St Mirren	2–0	Celtic	Paisley
				Stadium: St Mirren Park, Love Street; Attendance: 4,000

=== Scottish Cup ===
9 January 1897 First round	Arthurlie	4–2	Celtic	Arthurlie
				Stadium: Dunterlie Park; Attendance: 2,000
