= 1900–01 Celtic F.C. season =

Celtic
1900–01 season
- Manager: Willie Maley
- Stadium: Celtic Park
- Scottish First Division: 2nd
- Scottish Cup: Finalists

1900–1901 was Celtic's 13th season of competitive football. As members of the Scottish Football Association, they competed in the Scottish First Division. Celtic ended the league as runners-up and could not retain their Scottish Cup trophy, losing the final 3-4 to Heart of Midlothian.

== Competitions ==
=== Scottish First Division ===
==== League table ====
Pos	Team	Pld	W	D	L	GF	GA	GD	Pts	Qualification or relegation
1	Rangers (C)	20	17	1	2	60	25	+35	35	Champions
2	Celtic	20	13	3	4	49	28	+21	29	
3	Hibernian	20	9	7	4	29	22	+7	25	
4	Morton	20	9	3	8	40	40	0	21	
5	Kilmarnock	20	7	4	9	35	47	−12	18	

Source: "1900-1901 Division 1 - SPFL Archive". SPFL.
Rules for classification: Teams finish equal if level on points. Points system: 2 points for a win, 1 point for a draw, 0 points for a loss
(C) Champions

==== Matches ====
15 August 1900 First Division	Celtic	3–3	Partick Thistle	Glasgow
				Stadium: Celtic Park; Attendance: 4,000

18 August 1900 First Division	Morton	2–3	Celtic	Greenock
				Stadium: Cappielow Park; Attendance: 6,500

25 August 1900 First Division	Celtic	3–1	Hibernian	Glasgow
				Stadium: Celtic Park; Attendance: 12,000

1 September 1900 First Division	Third Lanark	1–2	Celtic	Glasgow
				Stadium: Cathkin Park; Attendance: 8,000

8 September 1900 First Division	Queen's Park	0–2	Celtic	Glasgow
				Stadium: Hampden Park; Attendance: 17,000

17 September 1900 First Division	Hearts	0–2	Celtic	Edinburgh
				Stadium: Tynecastle Park; Attendance: 7,000

24 September 1900 First Division	Celtic	5–1	Third Lanark	Glasgow
				Stadium: Celtic Park; Attendance: 8,000

29 September 1900 First Division	Hibernian	2–2	Celtic	Edinburgh
				Stadium: Easter Road; Attendance: 12,500

6 October 1900 First Division	Celtic	2–1	Rangers	Glasgow
				Stadium: Celtic Park; Attendance: 16,000

13 October 1900 First Division	Celtic	2–0	Queen's Park	Glasgow
				Stadium: Celtic Park; Attendance: 12,000

27 October 1900 First Division	Celtic	1–0	Kilmarnock	Glasgow
				Stadium: Celtic Park; Attendance: 5,000

3 November 1900 First Division	Kilmarnock	2–1	Celtic	Kilmarnock
				Stadium: Rugby Park; Attendance: 6,500

10 November 1900 First Division	Dundee	1–1	Celtic	Dundee
				Stadium: Dens Park; Attendance: 14,000

17 November 1900 First Division	Celtic	1–3	Hearts	Glasgow
				Stadium: Celtic Park; Attendance: 6,000

24 November 1900 First Division	Celtic	4–2	Morton	Glasgow
				Stadium: Celtic Park; Attendance: 1,000

1 December 1900 First Division	Partick Thistle	2–6	Celtic	Glasgow
				Stadium: Meadowside

15 December 1900 First Division	Celtic	3–0	St Mirren	Glasgow
				Stadium: Celtic Park; Attendance: 3,000

22 December 1900 First Division	Celtic	1–2	Dundee	Glasgow
				Stadium: Celtic Park; Attendance: 3,000

1 January 1901 First Division	Rangers	2–1	Celtic	Glasgow
				Stadium: Ibrox Park; Attendance: 30,000

19 January 1901 First Division	St Mirren	3–4	Celtic	Paisley
				Stadium: St Mirren Park, Love Street; Attendance: 3,000

=== Inter City League ===
2 January 1901 Inter City League	Celtic	3–2	Hearts	Glasgow
				Stadium: Celtic Park

23 February 1901 Inter City League	Hearts	3–2	Celtic	Edinburgh
				Stadium: Tynecastle Park

2 March 1901 Inter City League	Celtic	3–0	Queen's Park	Glasgow
				Stadium: Celtic Park

8 April 1901 Inter City League	Rangers	4–3	Celtic	Glasgow
				Stadium: Ibrox Park

13 April 1901 Inter City League	Celtic	1–0	Rangers	Glasgow
				Stadium: Celtic Park

20 April 1901 Inter City League	Celtic	0–2	Third Lanark	Glasgow
				Stadium: Celtic Park

24 April 1901 Inter City League	Celtic	1–2	Hibernian	Glasgow
				Stadium: Celtic Park

30 April 1901 Inter City League	Queen's Park	0–5	Celtic	Glasgow
				Stadium: Hampden Park

4 May 1901 Inter City League	Hibernian	1–0	Celtic	Edinburgh
				Stadium: Easter Road

=== Scottish Cup ===
12 January 1901 First round	Celtic	1–0	Rangers	Glasgow
				Stadium: Celtic Park; Attendance: 28,000

9 February 1901 Second round	Celtic	6–0	Kilmarnock	Glasgow
				Stadium: Celtic Park; Attendance: 12,000

16 February 1901 Third round	Dundee	0–1	Celtic	Dundee
				Stadium: Dens Park; Attendance: 17,000

23 March 1901 Semi-final	Celtic	1–0	St Mirren	Glasgow
				Stadium: Celtic Park; Attendance: 17,000

6 April 1901 Final	Celtic	3–4	Hearts	Glasgow
				Stadium: Ibrox Park; Attendance: 17,000
