= Hawkhill =

Cricket and football ground in Edinburgh, Scotland

- Location within the City of Edinburgh council area
- Location: Edinburgh, Scotland
- Coordinates: 55.9646°N 3.1577°W
- Surface: Grass

Construction
- Closed: 1920

Tenants
- Leith Caledonian CC; Leith Athletic F.C.

Hawkhill was a cricket and football ground in the Leith area of Edinburgh, Scotland. It was the home ground of Leith Athletic.

== History ==
The ground was originally used by Leith Caledonian Cricket Club, before Leith Athletic started playing at the ground after being established in 1887. A running track was installed around the perimeter of the pitch, and stands built on the western side and in the south-eastern corner. In 1891 homeless Hibernian agreed to play at Hawkhill, but after a single match on 28 February (a 1–1 draw with Mossend Swifts) a dispute over the terms of the lease resulted in Hibs leaving the ground.

Leith also later left to play at Beechwood Park until 1899, but were left temporarily homeless for the 1899–1900 season. They played their first home match of the season at St Bernard's' New Logie Green, but their second home match on 9 September was played back at Hawkhill, a 2–1 win over Partick Thistle. After playing their next game at New Logie Green, Leith returned to Hawkhill for the remainder of the season, the last match being a 1–0 defeat to Morton on 24 March. At the end of the season the club moved to their new Chancelot Park ground.

The ground closed in 1920 when it became part of Hawkhill Recreation Ground. The site was later used for housing.
