= Logie Green =

Logie Green may refer to two adjacent stadiums:

- New Logie Green, a football ground in Edinburgh in use between 1893 and 1899
- Old Logie Green, a football ground in Edinburgh in use between 1904 and 1926
