= Glasgow Football League =

Glasgow League
- Founded: 1896
- Abolished: 1906
- Region: Scotland
- Teams: 4–6
- Last champions: Third Lanark (2nd title)
- Most championships: Rangers (2 titles); Third Lanark (2 titles)

The Glasgow Football League was formed in 1896 (130 years ago) in Scotland as one of several supplementary football leagues that were created in order to increase the number of fixtures for Scottish Football League clubs. In 1899 a number of clubs who played in the Edinburgh / East of Scotland Football League joined and the league was renamed the Inter City Football League. The Glasgow Football League was briefly reformed in its own right in 1904 (122 years ago).

In general, attendances were disappointing (for example only 3,000 watched Celtic v Rangers in May 1902 and only 2,500 were at Hampden Park for Queen's Park v Third Lanark in the League decider in 1905). Several Scottish Football League fixtures also doubled up as Glasgow League matches, including the 1904–05 title play-off on 6 May 1905 between Rangers and Celtic.

== Membership ==
- Celtic 1895–1899, 1904–1906
- Clyde 1896–1899, 1905–1906
- Partick Thistle 1898–1899, 1904–1906
- Queen's Park 1895–1899, 1904–1906
- Rangers 1895–1899, 1904–1906
- Third Lanark 1895–1899, 1904–1906

== Champions ==
- 1895–96 Rangers
- 1896–97 Queen's Park
- 1897–98 Rangers
- 1898–99 Celtic
- 1899–1904 - replaced by the Inter City Football League
- 1904–05 Third Lanark
- 1905–06 Third Lanark

== See also ==
- Scottish Football (Defunct Leagues)
