= John Watson (footballer, born 1959) =

Scottish footballer

Personal information
- Date of birth: 13 February 1959 (age 67)
- Place of birth: Edinburgh, Scotland
- Position: Forward

Senior career*
Years	Team	Apps	(Gls)
-1980	Telman Star		
1980–1981	Meadowbank Thistle	4	(0)
1981–1983	Hong Kong Rangers		
1983–1989	Dunfermline Athletic	195	(72)
1989–1990	Fulham	14	(0)
1990–1993	Airdrieonians	71	(9)
Total		284	(81)
- * Club domestic league appearances and goals

John Watson (born 13 February 1959) is a Scottish retired professional footballer who played for Meadowbank Thistle, Hong Kong Rangers, Dunfermline Athletic, Fulham and Airdrieonians.

== Career ==
Watson started his career with amateur club Telman Star, before joining the senior ranks with Meadowbank Thistle, who signed him during the 1980–81 season. Watson made his debut on 11 October 1980 against Queen's Park, but failed to make another appearance for the club after manager Willie MacFarlane was sacked just two months later.

After a spell in Hong Kong with Hong Kong Rangers, where he played alongside former Meadowbank colleagues Hugh McGauran and Jimmy McQuade, Watson returned to Scotland and signed for Dunfermline Athletic. During six years with the Pars, he scored 85 goals in 214 league games and finished as the club's top scorer three times. Watson's contribution to Dunfermline Athletic was recognised formally when he was inducted to their Hall of Fame.

At the age of 30, Watson moved to London and signed for Fulham for the 1989–90 season, where he played 14 times in the league without scoring. In all competitions, he played 21 games for the Craven Cottage side, scoring twice.

In 1990 Watson returned to Scotland once more, playing three years with Airdrieonians, before joining the coaching staff at Berwick Rangers.
