= 1895–96 in Scottish football =

Football in Scotland
- Season: 1895–96

1895–96 in Scottish football

Division One champions
- Celtic

Division Two champions
- Abercorn

Scottish Cup winners
- Heart of Midlothian

Junior Cup winners
- Cambuslang Hibs

Scotland national team
- 1896 BHC

The 1895–96 season of Scottish football was the 23rd season of competitive football in Scotland and the sixth season of the Scottish Football League. This season also saw the introduction of the Scottish Qualifying Cup.

== League competitions ==
=== Scottish Division One ===
Celtic topped the Scottish Division One.

Pos	Team	Pld	W	D	L	GF	GA	GD	Pts	Qualification or relegation
1	Celtic (C)	18	15	0	3	64	25	+39	30	Champions
2	Rangers	18	11	4	3	57	39	+18	26	
3	Hibernian	18	11	2	5	58	39	+19	24	
4	Heart of Midlothian	18	11	0	7	68	36	+32	22	
5	Dundee	18	7	2	9	33	42	−9	16	
6	St Bernard's	18	7	1	10	36	53	−17	15	
6	Third Lanark	18	7	1	10	47	51	−4	15	
8	St Mirren	18	5	3	10	31	51	−20	13	
9	Clyde	18	4	3	11	39	59	−20	11	
10	Dumbarton (R)	18	4	0	14	36	74	−38	8	Relegated to the 1896–97 Scottish Division Two

Source: "1895-1896 Division 1 - SPFL Archive". SPFL.
Rules for classification: Teams finish equal if level on points. Points system: 2 points for a win, 1 point for a draw, 0 points for a loss
(C) Champions; (R) Relegated

=== Scottish Division Two ===
Abercorn came first in the Scottish Division Two. Leith Athletic and Renton finished second and third

Pos	Team	Pld	W	D	L	GF	GA	GD	Pts	Promotion or relegation
1	Abercorn (C, P)	18	12	3	3	55	31	+24	27	Promoted to the 1896–97 Scottish First Division
2	Leith Athletic	18	11	1	6	55	37	+18	23	
3	Kilmarnock	18	10	1	7	51	46	+5	21	
3	Renton	18	9	3	6	40	28	+12	21	
5	Airdrieonians	18	7	4	7	48	44	+4	18	
5	Partick Thistle	18	8	2	8	46	54	−8	18	
7	Port Glasgow Athletic	18	6	4	8	40	41	−1	16	
8	Motherwell	18	5	3	10	31	52	−21	13	
9	Morton	18	4	4	10	32	42	−10	12	
10	Linthouse	18	5	1	12	26	49	−23	11	

Source: statto.com
Rules for classification: Teams finish equal if level on points. Points system: 2 points for a win, 1 point for a draw, 0 points for a loss.
(C) Champions; (P) Promoted

== Other honours ==
=== Cup honours ===
==== National ====
Competition	Winner	Score	Runner-up
Scottish Cup	Heart of Midlothian	3 – 1	Hibernian
Scottish Qualifying Cup	Annbank	3 – 0	East Stirlingshire
Scottish Junior Cup	Cambuslang Hibs	3 – 1	Parkhead

==== County ====
Competition	Winner	Score	Runner-up
Aberdeenshire Cup	Victoria United	6 – 2	Aberdeen
Ayrshire Cup	Kilmarnock	7 – 2	Galston
Border Cup	Selkirk	6 – 2	Newcastleton
Dumbartonshire Cup	Renton	3 – 0	Dumbarton
East of Scotland Shield	Mossend Swifts	4 – 1	Polton Vale
Fife Cup	Clackmannan	w.o. (Note: Match awarded as Walkover.)	Alloa Athletic
Forfarshire Cup	Arbroath	2 – 0	Dundee
Glasgow Cup	Celtic	6 – 3	Queen's Park
Lanarkshire Cup	Royal Albert	6 – 1	Motherwell
Linlithgowshire Cup	Bo'ness	3 – 0	Armadale
North of Scotland Cup	Clachnacuddin	4 – 1	Elgin City
Perthshire Cup	St Johnstone	5 – 3 (Note: Replay needed.)	Dunblane
Renfrewshire Cup	Port Glasgow Athletic	3 – 0	St Mirren
Southern Counties Cup	St Cuthbert Wanderers	4 – 1	Douglas Wanderers
Stirlingshire Cup	Falkirk	6 – 1	Kilsyth Wanderers

=== Non-league honours ===
Highland League

Top Three
Pos	Team	Pld	W	D	L	GF	GA	GD	Pts
1	Inverness Caledonian (Note: Finished first after a play-off.)	10	7	1	2	29	16	+13	15
2	Inverness Thistle	10	7	1	2	26	11	+15	15
3	Clachnacuddin	10	5	2	3	32	19	+13	12

Source: RSSSF

Other Senior Leagues

Division	Winner
Ayrshire Combination	Ayr
Midland League	Stenhousemuir
Northern League	Forfar Athletic
Scottish Alliance	Wishaw Thistle

== Scotland national team ==
Date	Venue	Opponents	Score (Note: Scotland's score is shown first.)	Competition	Scotland scorer(s)
21 March 1896	Carolina Port, Dundee (H)	Wales	4–0	BHC	Robert Neil (2), Alex Keillor, Daniel Paton
28 March 1896	Solitude, Belfast (A)	Ireland	3–3	BHC	Robert McColl (2), James Blessington
4 April 1896	Celtic Park, Glasgow (H)	England	2–1	BHC	William Lambie, John Bell

Scotland were winners of the 1896 British Home Championship.

Key:

- (H) = Home match
- (A) = Away match
- BHC = British Home Championship

Team	Pld	W	D	L	GF	GA	GD	Pts
Scotland (C)	3	2	1	0	9	4	+5	5
England	3	2	0	1	12	3	+9	4
Wales	3	1	0	2	7	14	−7	2
Ireland	3	0	1	2	4	11	−7	1

Rules for classification: 1) points. The points system worked as follows: 2 points for a win and 1 point for a draw.
(C) Champions

== Other national teams ==
=== Scottish League XI ===
Date	Venue	Opponents	Score (Note: Scottish League XI's score is shown first.)	Scotland scorer(s)
15 February	Celtic Park, Glasgow (H)	(Northern Ireland) Irish League XI	3–2	Allan Martin (3)
11 April	Goodison Park, Liverpool (A)	(England) Football League XI	1–5	James Oswald

== See also ==
- 1895–96 Rangers F.C. season
