= 1897–98 Scottish Division One =

5th season of top-tier football league in Scotland

Scottish Division One
- Season: 1897–98
- Champions: Celtic; 4th title
- Matches: 90
- Goals: 414 (4.6 per match)
- Top goalscorer: Robert Hamilton (18 goals)

The 1897–98 Scottish Division One season was won by Celtic by four points over nearest rival Rangers.

== League table ==
| Pos | Team | Pld | W | D | L | GF | GA | GD | Pts | Qualification or relegation |
|---|---|---|---|---|---|---|---|---|---|---|
| 1 | Celtic (C) | 18 | 15 | 3 | 0 | 56 | 13 | +43 | 33 | Champions |
| 2 | Rangers | 18 | 13 | 3 | 2 | 71 | 15 | +56 | 29 | |
| 3 | Hibernian | 18 | 10 | 2 | 6 | 47 | 29 | +18 | 22 | |
| 4 | Heart of Midlothian | 18 | 8 | 4 | 6 | 54 | 33 | +21 | 20 | |
| 5 | St Mirren | 18 | 8 | 2 | 8 | 30 | 36 | −6 | 18 | |
| 5 | Third Lanark | 18 | 8 | 2 | 8 | 37 | 38 | −1 | 18 | |
| 7 | Dundee | 18 | 5 | 3 | 10 | 29 | 36 | −7 | 13 (Note: Dundee and Partick Thistle finished level on points but Dundee won a play-off match to determine ranking positions.) | |
| 8 | Partick Thistle | 18 | 6 | 1 | 11 | 34 | 64 | −30 | 13 | |
| 9 | St Bernard's | 18 | 4 | 1 | 13 | 35 | 67 | −32 | 9 | |
| 10 | Clyde | 18 | 1 | 3 | 14 | 21 | 83 | −62 | 5 | |

Source: statto.com
Rules for classification: Teams finish equal if level on points. Points system: 2 points for a win, 1 point for a draw, 0 points for a loss
(C) Champions

== Results ==
| Home \ Away | CEL | CLY | DND | HOM | HIB | PAR | RAN | STB | STM | THI |
|---|---|---|---|---|---|---|---|---|---|---|
| Celtic | | 6–1 | 2–1 | 3–2 | 4–1 | 3–1 | 0–0 | 5–1 | 3–0 | 4–0 |
| Clyde | 1–9 | | 1–5 | 2–2 | 2–4 | 2–3 | 1–8 | 4–2 | 2–3 | 1–1 |
| Dundee | 1–2 | 6–0 | | 1–6 | 1–1 | 5–0 | 2–1 | 0–0 | 0–0 | 4–2 |
| Heart of Midlothian | 0–0 | 8–1 | 2–0 | | 3–2 | 6–2 | 2–2 | 5–1 | 2–4 | 2–3 |
| Hibernian | 1–2 | 5–0 | 2–0 | 1–1 | | 4–2 | 0–5 | 6–1 | 3–1 | 6–0 |
| Partick Thistle | 3–6 | 1–1 | 3–1 | 3–2 | 0–3 | | 1–5 | 5–3 | 1–0 | 5–2 |
| Rangers | 0–4 | 7–0 | 5–0 | 2–0 | 1–0 | 6–1 | | 8–1 | 9–0 | 0–0 |
| St Bernard's | 0–2 | 3–1 | 4–1 | 1–5 | 3–2 | 9–1 | 2–4 | | 1–2 | 1–3 |
| St Mirren | 0–0 | 4–0 | 2–1 | 3–1 | 2–3 | 1–0 | 1–5 | 7–2 | | 0–1 |
| Third Lanark | 0–1 | 6–1 | 3–0 | 2–5 | 1–3 | 5–2 | 0–3 | 6–0 | 2–0 | |

Legend: Blue = home team win; Yellow = draw; Red = away team win.
