= 1895–96 Scottish Cup =

Tournament details
- Country: Scotland

Final positions
- Champions: Heart of Midlothian
- Runners-up: Hibernian

The 1895–96 Scottish Cup was the 23rd season of Scotland's most prestigious football knockout competition. This season saw the introduction of the Scottish Qualifying Cup as a preliminary competition.

The cup was won by Heart of Midlothian when they beat Hibernian 3–1 in the final.

== Calendar ==
Round	First match date	Fixtures	Clubs
First round	11 November 1895	16	32 → 16
Second round	25 January 1896	8	16 → 8
Quarter-finals	8 February 1896	4	8 → 4
Semi-finals	22 February 1896	2	4 → 2
Final	14 March 1896	1	2 → 1

== First round ==
Home team	Score	Away team
Annbank	3 – 2	Kilmarnock
Arbroath	5 – 0	King's Park
Ayr	3 – 2	Abercorn
Blantyre	1 – 12	Heart of Midlothian
Celtic	2 – 4	Queen's Park
Dumbarton	1 – 1	Rangers
East Stirlingshire	2 – 3	Hibernian
Lochgelly United	2 – 1	Raith Rovers *
Greenock Morton	2 – 3	Dundee
Polton Vale	0 – 3	Clyde
Port Glasgow Athletic	4 – 2	Arthurlie
Renton	1 – 0	Cowdenbeath
St Bernard's	8 – 1	Clackmannan
St Johnstone	4 – 3	Dundee Wanderers
St Mirren	7 – 0	Alloa Athletic
Third Lanark	6 – 0	Leith Athletic

- Match Declared Void

=== First round replay ===
Home team	Score	Away team
Lochgelly United	2 –5	Raith Rovers
Rangers	3 – 1	Dumbarton

== Second round ==
Home team	Score	Away team
Arbroath	3 –1	St Johnstone
Ayr	1 – 5	Heart of Midlothian
Hibernian	6 – 1	Raith Rovers
Queen's Park	8 – 1	Port Glasgow Athletic
Rangers	5 – 0	St Mirren
Renton	2 – 1	Clyde
St Bernard's	2 – 0	Annbank
Third Lanark	4 – 1	Dundee

== Quarter-final ==
Home team	Score	Away team
Arbroath	0 – 4	Heart of Midlothian
Queen's Park	2 – 3	St Bernard's
Rangers	2 – 3	Hibernian
Third Lanark	3 – 3	Renton

=== Quarter-final replay ===
Home team	Score	Away team
Renton	2 – 0	Third Lanark

== Semi-finals ==
Home team	Score	Away team
Heart of Midlothian	1 – 0	St Bernard's
Hibernian	2 – 1	Renton

== Final ==
14 March 1896

Heart of Midlothian	3–1	Hibernian
Davie Baird 3' (pen.); Alex King; Willie Michael		Jo O'Neill

New Logie Green

== See also ==
- 1895–96 in Scottish football
