= Robert Clements (footballer) =

Scottish footballer

Personal information
- Position: Inside left

Senior career*
| Years | Team | Apps | (Gls) |
- Leith Athletic

International career
| 1891 | Scotland | 1 | (0) |
- * Club domestic league appearances and goals

Robert Clements was a Scottish footballer, who played for Leith Athletic and Scotland.
