= 1894–95 Scottish Division One =

2nd season of top-tier football league in Scotland

Scottish Division One
- Season: 1894–95
- Champions: Heart of Midlothian; 1st title
- Relegated: Leith Athletic
- Matches: 90
- Goals: 388 (4.31 per match)
- Top goalscorer: James Miller (12 goals)

The 1894–95 Scottish Division One season was won by Heart of Midlothian by five points over nearest rival Celtic.

== League table ==
Pos	Team	Pld	W	D	L	GF	GA	GD	Pts	Qualification or relegation
1	Heart of Midlothian (C)	18	15	1	2	50	18	+32	31	Champions
2	Celtic	18	11	4	3	50	29	+21	26	
3	Rangers	18	10	2	6	41	26	+15	22	
4	Third Lanark	18	10	1	7	51	39	+12	21	
5	St Mirren	18	9	1	8	34	34	0	19	
6	St Bernard's	18	8	1	9	37	40	−3	17	
7	Clyde	18	8	0	10	38	47	−9	16	
8	Dundee	18	6	2	10	28	33	−5	14	
9	Dumbarton	18	3	1	14	27	58	−31	7	
10	Leith Athletic (R)	18	3	1	14	32	64	−32	7	Relegated to the 1895–96 Scottish Division Two

Source: "1894-1895 Division 1 - SPFL Archive". SPFL.
Rules for classification: Teams finish equal if level on points. Points system: 2 points for a win, 1 point for a draw, 0 points for a loss
(C) Champions; (R) Relegated

== Results ==
Home \ Away	CEL	CLY	DUM	DND	HOM	LEI	RAN	STB	STM	THI
Celtic		2–0	6–0	2–1	0–2	4–0	5–3	5–2	2–2	4–4
Clyde	2–4		3–1	2–0	3–2	5–2	1–5	1–4	0–2	4–3
Dumbarton	0–2	2–3		2–4	1–4	3–2	1–0	3–4	4–1	2–4
Dundee	1–1	4–1	3–0		0–2	4–1	2–1	2–2	0–1	1–2
Heart of Midlothian	4–0	2–4	3–1	4–0		3–1	0–0	4–3	1–0	6–3
Leith Athletic	5–6	2–1	1–1	3–2	1–4		3–4	0–2	1–2	3–2
Rangers	1–1	4–1	3–0	1–0	0–1	5–1		2–1	4–3	0–1
St Bernard's	0–2	0–3	5–0	2–0	0–3	6–3	1–4		2–0	2–4
St Mirren	0–3	4–2	4–3	5–1	1–2	3–2	4–2	0–1		2–0
Third Lanark	2–1	4–2	6–3	1–3	0–3	7–1	0–2	4–0	4–0	

Legend: Blue = home team win; Yellow = draw; Red = away team win.
