= 1900–01 Scottish Cup =

Tournament details
- Country: Scotland

Final positions
- Champions: Heart of Midlothian
- Runners-up: Celtic

The 1900–01 Scottish Cup was the 28th season of Scotland's most prestigious football knockout competition. The cup was won by Heart of Midlothian when they beat holders Celtic 4–3 in the final at Ibrox Park (the same scoreline as in the previous season) to claim the trophy for a third time in their history.

== Calendar ==
Round	First match date	Fixtures	Clubs
First round	12 January 1901	16	32 → 16
Second round	26 January 1901	8	16 → 8
Quarter-finals	16 February 1901	4	8 → 4
Semi-finals	9 March 1901	2	4 → 2
Final	6 April 1901	1	2 → 1

== First round ==
Home team	Score	Away team
Ayr	2 – 2	Orion
Celtic	1 – 0	Rangers
Clyde	6 – 0	East Stirlingshire
Dundee	3 – 1	Arthurlie
Dundee Wanderers	0 – 3	Abercorn
Forfar Athletic	0 – 4	Leith Athletic
Heart of Midlothian	7 – 0	Mossend Swifts
Hibernian	7 – 0	Dumbarton
Kilmarnock	3 – 2	Airdrieonians
Greenock Morton	10 – 0	Bo'ness
Port Glasgow Athletic	9 – 1	Newton Stewart
Royal Albert	1 – 1	St Johnstone
St Bernard's	5 – 0	Partick Thistle
St Mirren	10 – 0	Kilwinning Eglinton
Stenhousemuir	1 – 3	Queen's Park
Third Lanark	5 – 0	Douglas Wanderers

=== First round replay ===
Home team	Score	Away team
Orion	1 – 3	Ayr
St Johnstone	0 - 2	Royal Albert

== Second round ==
Home team	Score	Away team
Ayr	1 –3	St Mirren
Celtic	2 – 1	Kilmarnock *
Clyde	3 – 5	Dundee
Heart of Midlothian	2 – 1	Queen's Park
Leith Athletic	0 – 3	Port Glasgow Athletic
Greenock Morton	1 – 1	St Bernard's **
Royal Albert	1 – 1	Hibernian
Third Lanark	1 – 1	Abercorn

- Match declared void as referee not present.
  - Match Abandoned

=== Second round replay ===
Home team	Score	Away team
Celtic	6 – 0	Kilmarnock
Greenock Morton	3 – 1	St Bernard's
Abercorn	0 – 1	Third Lanark
Hibernian	1 – 0	Royal Albert

== Quarter-final ==
Home team	Score	Away team
Dundee	0 – 1	Celtic
Hibernian	2 – 0	Greenock Morton
Port Glasgow Athletic	1 – 5	Heart of Midlothian
St Mirren	0 – 0	Third Lanark

=== Quarter-final replay ===
Home team	Score	Away team
Third Lanark	1 – 1	St Mirren

=== Quarter-final second replay ===
Home team	Score	Away team
St Mirren	3 – 3	Third Lanark

=== Quarter-final third replay ===
Home team	Score	Away team
St Mirren	1 – 0	Third Lanark

== Semi-finals ==
Home team	Score	Away team
Celtic	1 – 0	St Mirren
Heart of Midlothian	1 – 1	Hibernian

=== Semi-final replay ===
Home team	Score	Away team
Hibernian	1 – 2	Heart of Midlothian

== Final ==
6 April 1901

Heart of Midlothian	4–3	Celtic

Ibrox Park

== See also ==
- 1900–01 in Scottish football
