= 1899–1900 Scottish Football League =

Scottish football season

Statistics of the Scottish Football League in season 1899–1900.

== Overview ==
Rangers were champions of the Scottish Division One.

Partick Thistle won the Scottish Division Two.

== Scottish League Division One ==
Pos	Team	Pld	W	D	L	GF	GA	GD	Pts	Qualification or relegation
1	Rangers (C)	18	15	2	1	69	27	+42	32	Champions
2	Celtic	18	9	7	2	46	27	+19	25	
3	Hibernian	18	9	6	3	43	24	+19	24	
4	Heart of Midlothian	18	10	3	5	41	24	+17	23	
5	Kilmarnock	18	6	6	6	30	37	−7	18	
6	Dundee	18	4	7	7	36	39	−3	15	
6	Third Lanark	18	5	5	8	31	38	−7	15	
8	St Mirren	18	3	6	9	30	46	−16	12	
8	St Bernard's (R)	18	4	4	10	29	47	−18	12	Relegated to the 1900–01 Scottish Division Two
10	Clyde (R)	18	2	0	16	24	70	−46	4	Relegated to the 1900–01 Scottish Division Two

Source: "1899-1900 Division 1 - SPFL Archive". SPFL.
Rules for classification: Teams finish equal if level on points. Points system: 2 points for a win, 1 point for a draw, 0 points for a loss
(C) Champions; (R) Relegated

== Scottish League Division Two ==
Pos	Team	Pld	W	D	L	GF	GA	GD	Pts	Promotion or relegation
1	Partick Thistle (C, P)	18	14	1	3	55	26	+29	29	Promoted to the 1900–01 Scottish Division One
2	Morton (P)	18	14	0	4	66	25	+41	28	Promoted to the 1900–01 Scottish Division One
3	Port Glasgow Athletic	18	10	0	8	50	41	+9	20	
4	Leith Athletic	18	9	1	8	32	37	−5	19	
4	Motherwell	18	9	1	8	38	36	+2	19	
6	Abercorn	18	7	2	9	46	39	+7	16	
7	Hamilton Academical	18	7	1	10	33	45	−12	15	
8	Ayr	18	6	2	10	39	48	−9	14	
9	Airdrieonians	18	4	3	11	27	49	−22	11	
10	Linthouse (R)	18	2	5	11	28	68	−40	9	Failed re-election (Note: Linthouse failed re-election to compete in the next season and were replaced by East Stirlingshire.)

Source: statto.com
Rules for classification: Teams finish equal if level on points. Points system: 2 points for a win, 1 point for a draw, 0 points for a loss
(C) Champions; (P) Promoted; (R) Relegated

== See also ==
- 1899–00 in Scottish football
