= Edinburgh Athletic F.C. =

Former association football club in City of Edinburgh, Scotland

Edinburgh Athletic
- Full name: Edinburgh Athletic Football Club
- Nickname(s): The Crew
- Founded: 1968
- Dissolved: 2008
- Ground: Muirhouse Sports Ground, Marine Drive, Edinburgh
Home colours

Edinburgh Athletic Football Club were a Scottish football team based in Edinburgh. They played in the East of Scotland Football League until they merged into Leith Athletic in 2008.

The club were originally named Manor Thistle, having started as a team of employees of the many solicitors' firms in Edinburgh's Manor Place. They played at the Jewel and Esk Valley College ground until 1996 when they moved to Marine Drive playing fields in the north-west of the city near Muirhouse. They joined the East of Scotland League in 1991 and merged with Telman Star Amateur F.C. in 1997 to form Edinburgh Athletic F.C.

Their highest league placing was in season 1996–97 when they finished fourth in the East of Scotland Football League Premier Division. They were relegated to the First Division the following season and finished bottom in their final season before the merger with Leith Athletic.

== Colours ==
Home colours used when club was named Manor Thistle FC

Manor Thistle played in Maroon-coloured shirts with a sky-blue trim, white shorts, and Maroon socks. After changing name to Edinburgh Athletic the club played in navy-blue shirts and shorts.

== Honours ==
King Cup

- Runners-up : 1996–97

Alex Jack Cup

- Winners: 2002–03

As Manor Thistle

East of Scotland League First Division

- Winners: 1991–92

Alex Jack Cup

- Winners (2): 1992–93, 1995–96
