= 1901–02 Scottish Division One =

9th season of top-tier football league in Scotland

Scottish Division One
- Season: 1901–02
- Champions: Rangers; 5th title
- Matches: 90
- Goals: 284 (3.16 per match)
- Top goalscorer: William Maxwell (10 goals)

The 1901–02 Scottish Division One season was won by Rangers by two points over nearest rival Celtic.

== League table ==
Pos	Team	Pld	W	D	L	GF	GA	GD	Pts	Qualification or relegation
1	Rangers (C)	18	13	2	3	43	29	+14	28	Champions
2	Celtic	18	11	4	3	38	28	+10	26	
3	Heart of Midlothian	18	10	2	6	32	21	+11	22	
4	Third Lanark	18	7	5	6	30	26	+4	19	
5	St Mirren	18	8	3	7	29	28	+1	19	
6	Hibernian	18	6	4	8	36	24	+12	16	
7	Kilmarnock	18	5	6	7	21	25	−4	16	
8	Queen's Park	18	5	4	9	21	32	−11	14	
9	Dundee	18	4	5	9	16	31	−15	13	
10	Morton	18	1	5	12	18	40	−22	7	

Source: nozdrul.plus.com
(C) Champions

== Results ==
Home \ Away	CEL	DND	HOM	HIB	KIL	MOR	QPA	RAN	STM	THI
Celtic		1–1	1–2	2–2	4–2	2–1	1–0	2–4	3–1	3–2
Dundee	2–3		2–0	1–0	0–0	0–0	2–0	0–3	1–2	1–1
Heart of Midlothian	2–2	4–0		2–1	3–0	3–1	1–1	0–2	2–0	4–1
Hibernian	1–2	5–0	1–2		5–0	1–2	8–1	2–3	1–2	2–2
Kilmarnock	0–1	4–0	1–0	0–0		3–2	1–1	4–2	1–2	1–2
Morton	1–2	1–4	1–3	0–2	1–1		2–2	2–3	1–3	1–4
Queen's Park	3–2	1–0	2–1	2–0	0–1	1–1		0–1	3–0	0–1
Rangers	2–2	3–1	2–1	0–2	3–2	2–1	2–1		3–2	1–4
St Mirren	2–3	3–0	1–2	1–1	1–1	1–1	4–0	1–5		2–0
Third Lanark	0–2	0–0	2–0	1–2	0–0	4–1	4–3	2–2	0–1	

Legend: Blue = home team win; Yellow = draw; Red = away team win.
