= Beechwood Park, Leith =

Former football ground in Leith, Scotland

Beechwood Park
- Location within the City of Edinburgh council area
- Former names: Bank Park
- Location: Edinburgh, Scotland
- Coordinates: 55.9639°N 3.1629°W
- Surface: Grass
- Record attendance: 7,000

Construction
- Closed: 1899

Tenant
- Leith Athletic F.C. (1891–1899)

Beechwood Park, initially known as Bank Park, was a football ground in the Leith area of Edinburgh, Scotland. It was the home ground of Leith Athletic during their first seven seasons in the Scottish Football League (SFL).

== History ==
Leith Athletic played at Bank Park when they joined the SFL in 1891. The first league match was played at the ground on 22 August 1891, with Leith beaten 3–2 by Renton; Renton's Alex McColl scored the first-ever penalty kick in SFL history during the game. The ground's record attendance was set later in the season when 7,000 saw Leith draw 3–3 with Dumbarton in a Scottish Cup second round replay on 13 February 1892. The highest league attendance was set a few weeks later on 18 April, with 6,000 watching a 2–1 win over Celtic.

In 1895 the ground was renamed Beechwood Park. Leith left in 1899, with the final league match played on 15 April 1899, a 3–3 draw with Kilmarnock. The club briefly groundshared with St Bernard's at New Logie Green at the start of the 1899–1900 season, and played the remainder of their matches at Hawkhill. The following season they moved to Chancelot Park. After the club left Beechwood Park the North British Railway built the line into Leith Central across the site.
