= 1896–97 Scottish Division One =

4th season of top-tier football league in Scotland

Scottish Division One
- Season: 1896–97
- Champions: Heart of Midlothian; 2nd title
- Relegated: Abercorn
- Matches: 90
- Goals: 388 (4.31 per match)
- Top goalscorer: Willie Taylor (12 goals)

The 1896–97 Scottish Division One season was won by Heart of Midlothian, two points ahead of nearest rival Hibernian.

== League table ==
Pos	Team	Pld	W	D	L	GF	GA	GD	Pts	Qualification or relegation
1	Heart of Midlothian (C)	18	13	2	3	47	22	+25	28	Champions
2	Hibernian	18	12	2	4	50	20	+30	26	
3	Rangers	18	11	3	4	64	30	+34	25	
4	Celtic	18	10	4	4	42	18	+24	24	
5	Dundee	18	10	2	6	38	30	+8	22	
6	St Mirren	18	9	1	8	38	29	+9	19	
7	St Bernard's	18	7	0	11	32	40	−8	14	
8	Third Lanark	18	5	1	12	29	46	−17	11	
9	Clyde	18	4	0	14	27	65	−38	8	
10	Abercorn (R)	18	1	1	16	21	88	−67	3	Relegated to the 1897–98 Scottish Division Two

Source: statto.com
Rules for classification: Teams finish equal if level on points. Points system: 2 points for a win, 1 point for a draw, 0 points for a loss
(C) Champions; (R) Relegated

== Results ==
Home \ Away	ABC	CEL	CLY	DND	HOM	HIB	RAN	STB	STM	THI
Abercorn		0–6	1–3	1–7	0–1	2–2	2–9	2–3	3–2	1–2
Celtic	5–0		4–1	0–1	3–0	1–1	1–1	2–0	2–1	2–0
Clyde	6–2	2–7		0–2	1–5	0–7	2–7	1–2	3–1	3–2
Dundee	3–0	2–2	1–0		0–5	3–0	3–2	4–1	3–2	2–0
Heart of Midlothian	6–1	1–1	5–0	2–2		1–0	2–1	3–1	2–1	2–1
Hibernian	9–0	3–1	5–1	3–1	2–0		4–3	2–0	3–0	2–0
Rangers	6–1	2–0	2–1	3–1	5–0	4–3		3–2	5–1	6–1
St Bernard's	6–0	1–2	4–1	2–1	2–5	0–1	3–2		0–2	2–3
St Mirren	4–2	2–0	5–0	4–1	0–2	2–0	2–2	4–0		2–0
Third Lanark	8–3	0–3	3–2	3–1	1–5	1–3	1–1	2–3	1–3	

Legend: Blue = home team win; Yellow = draw; Red = away team win.
