= Chancelot Park =

Former football ground in Leith, Scotland

- Location within the City of Edinburgh council area
- Location: Edinburgh, Scotland
- Coordinates: 55.9725°N 3.1935°W
- Surface: Grass

Tenant
- Leith Athletic

Chancelot Park was a football ground in the Leith area of Edinburgh, Scotland. It was the home ground of Leith Athletic from 1900 until 1904 and again from 1919 until 1924.

== History ==
Leith moved to Chancelot Park in 1900 from their Hawkhill ground. Their first league match was played at the new ground on 8 September 1900, a 1–0 win over Airdrieonians. However, in 1904 the club took over Old Logie Green, formerly the ground of St Bernard's, their final league game at Chancelot Park being a 2–0 defeat to Raith Rovers on 5 March 1904.

The club returned to Chancelot Park after World War I as St Bernard's had taken over Old Logie Green, and played some of its matches at Chancelot Park until being readmitted to the Scottish Football League in 1924, when they returned to Old Logie Green. The ground later became Lethem Park.
