= 1900–01 Scottish Division One =

8th season of top-tier football league in Scotland

Scottish Division One
- Season: 1900–01
- Champions: Rangers; 4th title
- Relegated: Partick Thistle
- Matches: 110
- Goals: 385 (3.5 per match)
- Top goalscorer: Robert Hamilton (20 goals)

The 1900–01 Scottish Division One season was won by Rangers by six points over nearest rival Celtic.

== League table ==
Pos	Team	Pld	W	D	L	GF	GA	GD	Pts	Qualification or relegation
1	Rangers (C)	20	17	1	2	60	25	+35	35	Champions
2	Celtic	20	13	3	4	49	28	+21	29	
3	Hibernian	20	9	7	4	29	22	+7	25	
4	Morton	20	9	3	8	40	40	0	21	
5	Kilmarnock	20	7	4	9	35	47	−12	18	
5	Third Lanark	20	6	6	8	20	29	−9	18	
7	Dundee	20	6	5	9	36	35	+1	17	
7	Queen's Park	20	7	3	10	33	37	−4	17	
9	St Mirren	20	5	6	9	33	43	−10	16	
10	Heart of Midlothian	20	5	4	11	22	30	−8	14	
11	Partick Thistle (R)	20	4	2	14	28	49	−21	10	Relegated to the 1901–02 Scottish Division Two

Source: "1900-1901 Division 1 - SPFL Archive". SPFL.
Rules for classification: Teams finish equal if level on points. Points system: 2 points for a win, 1 point for a draw, 0 points for a loss
(C) Champions; (R) Relegated

== Results ==
Home \ Away	CEL	DND	HOM	HIB	KIL	MOR	PAR	QPA	RAN	STM	THI
Celtic		1–2	1–3	3–1	1–0	4–2	3–3	2–0	2–1	3–0	5–1
Dundee	1–1		1–2	1–3	3–0	5–2	4–0	4–0	1–5	1–1	0–0
Heart of Midlothian	0–2	0–4		0–0	7–0	1–2	1–3	1–2	0–1	0–0	0–0
Hibernian	2–2	2–1	3–0		2–2	1–1	2–0	0–1	4–1	1–0	2–0
Kilmarnock	2–1	2–0	1–3	2–2		4–1	2–1	2–1	1–2	2–2	2–1
Morton	2–3	5–1	2–2	1–0	3–2		2–3	6–2	1–3	1–0	1–0
Partick Thistle	2–6	1–1	0–1	0–1	1–2	1–2		1–4	1–2	5–3	3–1
Queen's Park	0–2	1–0	4–0	1–1	5–5	3–0	2–0		2–3	0–0	0–2
Rangers	2–1	4–2	1–0	6–0	5–1	3–2	4–1	3–2		5–2	4–0
St Mirren	3–4	3–3	2–1	0–2	3–1	0–2	5–2	4–3	1–4		2–1
Third Lanark	1–2	2–1	1–0	0–0	3–2	2–2	1–0	1–0	1–1	2–2	

Legend: Blue = home team win; Yellow = draw; Red = away team win.
