= Royal Gymnasium Ground =

Former sports venue in Edinburgh, Scotland

- The Gymmie
- Location within the City of Edinburgh council area
- Location: Edinburgh, Scotland
- Coordinates: 55.9602°N 3.1974°W
- Capacity: 40,000
- Surface: Grass

Construction
- Opened: 1880
- Renovated: 1922–24
- Closed: 1943

Tenants
- St Bernard's

The Royal Gymnasium Ground was a football ground in Edinburgh, Scotland. It was the home ground of St Bernard's for most of their existence.

== History ==
The Royal Gymnasium Ground was built on the site of the Royal Patent Gymnasium in Royal Crescent Park. St Bernard's first moved to the Royal Gymnasium Ground in 1880, when it was only a football pitch. Due to the lack of facilities, the club moved to Powderhall in 1883, before moving on to New Logie Green in 1889. After their lease on New Logie Green expired at the end of 1899, they played temporarily at Ibrox and New Powderhall, before returning to the Royal Gymnasium Ground in November 1900. The site had been left derelict and a new ground was constructed; the pitch was laid on a north–south axis, with a covered stand on the eastern side of the pitch containing a seated area and a paddock. The club's first league game at the ground was played on 3 November 1900, a 3–3 draw with Hamilton Academical.

During World War I the Army commandeered the ground. It was used by the Royal Army Service Corps as a heavy transport depot, which destroyed the pitch and drainage system. When the war ended, the club were unable to return, and were forced to play at Leith Athletic's Old Logie Green (a renamed Powderhall) instead. In 1922 the club's supporters purchased the Royal Gymnasium Ground. The stadium was completely rebuilt, with the pitch rotated to an east–west axis; a new 1,500-seat stand was built on the southern side of the pitch and embankments and terracing were installed on the other three sides, giving a capacity of 40,000. The redevelopment took two years, and the first game back at the ground was not played until 15 November 1924, a 1–0 defeat to Arthurlie. The first few matches of the 1924–25 season had been played at Tynecastle as Leith had taken over Old Logie Green again following their readmission to the SFL.

Due to their pitch at New Powderhall being waterlogged, Leith played a home match at the Royal Gymnasium Ground on 24 September 1937, a 2–1 win over Alloa Athletic in front of 3,000 spectators. St Bernard's highest recorded league attendance at the ground was set on 19 November 1932 when 15,000 saw a 1–0 defeat to Edinburgh rivals Hibernian.

During World War II the club suffered a financial crisis, and were forced to sell the ground. £2,000 was raised by selling the grandstand to Leith to use at their New Meadowbank ground. The site of the Royal Gymnasium Ground became part of the King George V playing fields and a car park. St Bernard's last SFL match at the ground had been a 0–0 draw with Queen's Park on 2 September 1939.

== Greyhound racing ==
The greyhound track around the pitch opened with a first meeting held on 2 September 1930 and racing was held on Tuesday and Thursday evenings and Wednesday and Saturday afternoons. The turf had to be lifted at the corners of the pitch and the hare was on a wire hawser. The racing was independent (unlicensed) and only lasted until 1933.
