= Inter City Football League =

Inter City League
- Founded: 1899
- Abolished: 1906
- Region: Scotland
- Number of teams: 4–9
- Last champions: Dundee (1st title)
- Most successful club(s): Heart of Midlothian (2 titles)

The Inter City Football League was formed in 1899 in Scotland as one of several supplementary football leagues that were created in order to increase the number of fixtures for Scottish Football League clubs.

The founder members of the league were Celtic, Queen's Park, Rangers and Third Lanark (who had previously played supplementary fixtures in the Glasgow Football League) plus Heart of Midlothian and Hibernian (who in addition to the Inter City League continued to play supplementary matches in the Edinburgh / East of Scotland Football League). In 1902 Dundee, Partick Thistle and St Mirren joined and this remained the league's line-up until it disbanded in 1904.

== Champions ==
- 1899–1900 Celtic
- 1900–01 Third Lanark
- 1901–02 Heart of Midlothian
- 1902–03 Heart of Midlothian
- 1903–04 unfinished
- 1904–05 unfinished
- 1905–06 Dundee

== See also ==
- Scottish Football (Defunct Leagues)
