= Ibrox Park (1887–1899) =

Football ground in Scotland

- Location within Glasgow council area
- Location: Ibrox, Scotland
- Coordinates: 55.8533°N 4.3068°W
- Surface: Grass

Construction
- Built: 1887
- Opened: 20 August 1887
- Closed: 9 December 1899
- Demolished: 1899

Tenant
- Rangers F.C. (1887–99)

Ibrox Park was a football ground in Ibrox, Scotland. It was the home ground of Rangers from 1887 until they moved to the adjacent second Ibrox in 1899. The ground staged the Scottish Cup Final four times and also three Scotland international matches.

== History ==
Rangers' previous ground at Kinning Park had been built up to hold 20,000 people, but further expansion was impossible and so the club identified a site further west to build a new ground. Although the site at Ibrox (at that time part of the burgh of Govan, today part of Glasgow) was then on the outskirts of the city, it had good transport links, including the nearby Ibrox railway station. A ten-year lease on the site was secured and a ground constructed by Fred Braby & Co. An uncovered 1,200-seat stand was erected on the northern side of the pitch with an adjacent pavilion. The other three sides were terraced, with a running track around the pitch. The ground was opened on 20 August 1887 with a friendly match against Preston North End.

A new grandstand was built on the southern side of the pitch, after which the ground was used to host three Scotland internationals; an 1889 British Home Championship match against Ireland (7–0 to Scotland), an 1892 British Home Championship match against England (1–4) and an 1897 British Home Championship match against Ireland (5–1). It was also used to host the 1890 Scottish Cup final, and the replay, between Queen's Park and Vale of Leven.

Rangers were playing at the ground when they joined the new Scottish Football League for the 1890–91 season, with the first league match played at the ground on 18 August 1890, a 5–2 win against Hearts in front of a crowd of 4,000. The ground was chosen to host the 1892 Scottish Cup Final between Celtic and Queen's Park, but proved inadequate for the estimated 30,000 attendance. There were further problems when Ibrox hosted the international against England three weeks later; a stand collapsed, causing two deaths. The 1893 Cup Final, again between Celtic and Queen's Park, was also staged at Ibrox, but again there were problems; the match was declared void due to poor pitch conditions and had to be played again. The ground hosted the Cup Final for the fourth and last time when St Bernard's played Renton in 1895.

With the new Celtic Park, opened in 1892, becoming established as Glasgow's leading football venue, Rangers subsequently decided to take out a lease on a new site adjacent to Ibrox Park and build a new stadium from scratch, which opened in December 1899. The second Ibrox Park (now Ibrox Stadium) was built west of and partially overlapping the site of its predecessor, which backed directly onto Copland Road; the eastern end of the site was used for housing. The club's final league match at the original Ibrox Park was played on 9 December 1899, a 6–1 win over Kilmarnock with 5,000 in attendance. However, the new Ibrox was not ready in time for the next match against St Mirren on 16 December, which was instead played at Partick Thistle's Meadowside.

=== Athletics ===
On Saturday 22 June 1895 the thirteenth annual Scottish Amateur Athletic Championships were held at Ibrox Park. There had for a number of years been a disagreement in Scottish athletics over whether professional cycle racing events should be allowed at amateur athletics meetings. There were strong views both in favour and against the position, and arriving at a deadlock in their negotiations several western district clubs in favour of allowing professional cycle events, led by Clydesdale Harriers, seceded from the Scottish AAA and formed the Scottish Amateur Athletics Union (SAAU). The consequence of this was that there were two national championships in both 1895 and 1896 held under the auspices of the two separate bodies. In 1895 they were both held on the same day in the same city, at the grounds of opposing football clubs, and if attendance is anything to go by the Scottish public made their feeling on the topic abundantly clear. Over 6,000 fans attended the breakaway SAAU championships at Hampden Park where Robert Langlands became the first Scottish athlete to break two minutes for 880 yards, whilst barely 1000 spectators saw Mrs McNab, the wife of the Hon. Secretary SAAA, present the prizes at Ibrox Park.
