= Edinburgh Football League =

Edinburgh / East of Scotland League
- Founded: 1894
- Abolished: 1907
- Region: Scotland
- Teams: 4–7
- Last champions: Dundee (3rd title)
- Most championships: Heart of Midlothian (7 titles)

The Edinburgh Football League was formed in 1894 in Scotland as one of several supplementary football leagues that were created in order to increase the number of fixtures for Scottish Football League clubs. It changed its name to the East of Scotland Football League in 1896 when Dundee joined.

In 1899, some of its clubs also entered the Inter City League along with former Glasgow League clubs. The East of Scotland League eventually disbanded in 1908 and has no connection to the present day East of Scotland Football League. A 'North-Eastern Cup' was organised in place of the league, which ran until 1914.

== Member clubs ==
Membership included Aberdeen, Dundee, East Stirlingshire, Falkirk, Heart of Midlothian, Hibernian, Leith Athletic, Raith Rovers, and St Bernard's. The league champions were awarded the McRae Cup.

== Champions ==
- 1894–95 Heart of Midlothian
- 1895–96 Heart of Midlothian
- 1896–97 Heart of Midlothian
- 1897–98 Heart of Midlothian
- 1898–99 Heart of Midlothian
- 1899–1900 Heart of Midlothian
- 1900–01 Dundee
- 1901–02 Hibernian
- 1902–03 Dundee
- 1903–04 Heart of Midlothian
- 1904–05 Falkirk
- 1905–06 Aberdeen
- 1906–07 Dundee
- 1907–08 Unfinished

=== North-Eastern Cup ===
- 1908–09 Dundee
- 1909–10 Heart of Midlothian
- 1910–11 Hibernian
- 1911–12 Falkirk
- 1912–13 Heart of Midlothian
- 1913–14 Aberdeen

== See also ==
- List of defunct football leagues in Scotland
