= Old Logie Green =

Former football ground in Edinburgh, Scotland

- Location within the City of Edinburgh council area
- Location: Edinburgh, Scotland
- Coordinates: 55.9662°N 3.1957°W
- Surface: Grass
- Record attendance: 15,000

Construction
- Closed: 1926

Tenants
- St Bernard's (1883–1889); Leith Athletic (1904–1915); St Bernard's (1921–1924); Leith Athletic (1924–1926)

Old Logie Green was a football ground in the Bonnington area of Edinburgh, Scotland. It was the home ground of Leith Athletic and St Bernard's between 1904 and 1926, both having previously played at the neighbouring New Logie Green ground.

== History ==
The ground was originally known as Powderhall, and was renamed the Heriot Cricket and Football Ground before becoming Old Logie Green. It was located directly to the south-east of the Powderhall Grounds, which later became New Powderhall, and to the north-east of New Logie Green.

Leith Athletic moved to the ground from Chancelot Park in 1904, and played their first league game there on 27 August 1904, a 3–1 win over Hamilton Academical. The ground already had a covered stand on the eastern side of the pitch, and embankments were later built around the rest of it. On 11 May 1907 it was used as a neutral venue for a play-off match between Raith Rovers and East Stirlingshire to decide the tenth and eleventh places in Division Two, Raith winning 3–2.

The probable record attendance at Old Logie Green was set on 22 January 1910 when 15,000 watched a Scottish Cup first round match against Clyde, with the visitors winning 1–0. Leith's highest league attendance at the ground was 5,000 for a 0–0 draw with Raith Rovers on 5 February 1910. The Scottish Football League was suspended during World War I, and Leith's final SFL league game at the ground before the suspension was played on 20 February 1915, with Albion Rovers beaten 3–0. However, Leith did not rejoin the SFL after the war, and played matches at Chancelot Park and Wardie Park instead during the post-war period.

At the start of the 1921–22 season, the first season of Division Two football after the war, St Bernard's moved into the ground, playing their first league match on 27 August 1921, a 0–0 draw with Arbroath in front of 800 spectators. Their Royal Gymnasium Ground had been commandeered by the Army during the war, who had used it as a heavy transport depot. This had destroyed the pitch and the drainage system, meaning the ground was unusable. Although it was purchased by the club's supporters in 1922, it took until November 1924 for it to be completely rebuilt. St Bernard's last league match at Old Logie Green was played on 12 April 1924, a 2–1 defeat to Broxburn United. As their lease had expired, the club played a few matches at Tynecastle at the start of the 1924–25 season before moving back to the Royal Gymnasium Ground.

Having been readmitted to the SFL for the start of the 1924–25 season, Leith returned to Old Logie Green, playing their first league game back at the ground on 23 August 1924, a 2–1 win over Clackmannan. However, they remained there for just two seasons, moving to the adjacent New Powderhall in 1926. The final league match was played at Old Logie Green on 17 April 1926, a 4–1 win over Johnstone in front of 1,500 spectators. The site was subsequently used for kennels for the greyhound racing track at New Powderhall, and a supermarket was later built on it.
