= New Logie Green =

Sports venue in Edinburgh, Scotland

- Location within the City of Edinburgh council area
- Location: Edinburgh, Scotland
- Coordinates: 55.9649°N 3.1974°W
- Surface: Grass
- Record attendance: 16,034

Construction
- Opened: 1889
- Closed: 1899

Tenant
- St Bernard's

New Logie Green was a football ground in the Powderhall area of Edinburgh, Scotland. It was the home ground of St Bernard's from 1889 until 1899, and was also used to host the 1896 Scottish Cup final, the only time the Scottish Cup final has been played outside Glasgow. The ground was named after a nearby mansion.

== History ==
St Bernard's moved to New Logie Green in 1889 from Powderhall. An uncovered seated stand was built on the western side of the pitch and a pavilion in the north-east corner, with banking around the rest of the pitch. St Bernard's were elected into Division One of the Scottish Football League in 1893, and the first SFL match was played at New Logie Green on 26 August 1893, when 5,000 watched a 0–0 draw with Rangers. A grandstand was erected in 1894, and the highest league attendance was set on 10 November that year when a crowd of 8,000 saw a 2–0 defeat to Celtic. This was equalled on 19 September 1898 for a 2–0 defeat to Rangers.

The ground was selected by the Scottish FA to host that 1896 cup final between Edinburgh rivals Hearts and Hibernian, as the usual venue, Hampden Park, was being used for an international rugby match. Although a temporary stand was erected at the northern end of the pitch especially for the game, there were warnings that New Logie Green, which had an estimated capacity of 23,000, was not large enough to host a cup final. Supporters called for the match to be moved to Hampden Park or Ibrox in Glasgow, and Hearts even suggested playing the game at their own Tynecastle ground, but the game was not moved. The match was played on 14 March, with Hearts winning 3–1. Although the attendance of 16,034 was a ground record, it was well below capacity. The ground was also used by another Edinburgh club, Leith Athletic for two matches at the start of the 1899–1900 season.

St Bernard's' lease on the ground expired on 31 December 1899, and their final match at New Logie Green was on 30 December, a 3–3 draw with St Mirren. Their only remaining home league match of the season was played at Ibrox. After starting the 1900–01 season at New Powderhall, the club moved back to the Royal Gymnasium Ground, which they had originally played at in the 1880s. The site of New Logie Green was subsequently used as a car park for New Powderhall, and eventually for housing. In 1904 Leith Athletic moved to Old Logie Green (the original Powderhall stadium), which was located directly to the north-east of New Logie Green and to the south-east of New Powderhall.
