= Cathkin Park (1872–1903) =

Former football ground in Glasgow, Scotland

- Location within Glasgow council area
- Location: Glasgow, Scotland
- Coordinates: 55.8349°N 4.2542°W
- Surface: Grass
- Record attendance: 16,000

Construction
- Opened: 1872
- Closed: 1903

Tenants
- Third Lanark

Cathkin Park was a football ground in the Crosshill area of Glasgow, Scotland. It was the home ground of Third Lanark from their foundation in 1872 until they moved to New Cathkin Park in 1903. It also hosted Scottish Cup final matches and the Scotland national team.

== History ==
Third Lanark were founded in 1872 by members of the Third Lanarkshire Rifle Volunteers and began playing on a piece of land that formed part of a drilling field for the regiment. As the stadium developed, a grandstand was built on the western side of the pitch, a pavilion in the north-west corner, open seating on the northern and eastern sides of the pitch, and embankments at the southern end. An early experiment in floodlighting was conducted there in October 1878. The ground was considered good enough to host the Scottish Cup final in 1881–82, as well as its replay, with 14,000 turning up to watch Queen's Park beat Dumbarton 4–1. It was also selected as the venue of the 1883–84 final, although the match did not happen as Vale of Leven did not have enough players available, and was used again for the 1885–86 final. In 1884 it hosted two British Home Championship international matches, with Scotland beating England 1–0 in front of 10,000 spectators on 15 March (the first ever all-ticket match) and Wales 4–1 in front of 5,000 on 29 March.

Third Lanark were founder members of the Scottish Football League in 1890, and the first league match was played at Cathkin Park on 23 August 1890, with Dumbarton winning 3–1. At the end of the 1890–91 season it hosted a championship play-off between Dumbarton and Rangers, who had finished level on points. Following a 2–2 draw in front of 10,000 spectators, the clubs were jointly awarded the championship. The ground was used for play-offs again on 20 May 1896 when a match took place to decide which club would finish third and fourth in Division Two; Renton beating Kilmarnock 2–1.

The ground's highest league attendance of 16,000 was set on 19 August 1899 when Rangers visited, with the visitors winning 5–1. This was equalled for another game against Rangers on 28 September 1901, this time the game ending 2–2. In June 1902 the final of the first major Anglo-Scottish club competition, the British League Cup, took place at Cathkin (att: 10,000), won by Celtic against Rangers 3–2 after extra time.

At the end of the 1902–03 season the club left the original Cathkin Park to move to a new ground. Queen's Park had built a new stadium to replace their leased Hampden Park ground – which was about 500 yards (460 m) south of Cathkin – but had also named the new stadium Hampden Park. Third Lanark took over the older Hampden, renaming it New Cathkin Park, although it later became known as simply Cathkin Park. Third Lanark's final league game at the old Cathkin Park was played on 4 April 1903, losing 1–0 to Dundee. However, the final league match played at the ground was played on 17 October 1903, when Queen's Park used it as a home ground for their game against Partick Thistle (a 1–1 draw) as the new Hampden Park was not yet ready. After the new Hampden opened, Third Lanark used it for much of the 1903–04 season (which ended with them winning the league title) whilst building work was carried out at New Cathkin Park – the clubs failed to reach an arrangement over the sale of the existing fixtures, these were removed by Queen's Park and an almost entirely new stadium was constructed, with the grandstand at the old ground (relatively new, having been installed in 1891) relocated to the new site.

The site of the original Cathkin Park – approximately at the junction of Warren Street and Boyd Street – was subsequently used for housing.
