= Leith Athletic F.C. =

Association football club in Scotland

Leith Athletic
- Full name: Leith Athletic Football Club
- Nickname: The Leithers
- Founded: 1887; reformed 1996
- Ground: Meadowbank Stadium, Edinburgh
- Capacity: 500
- Coordinates: 55°57′25″N 3°9′31″W
- Chairman: Ger Freedman
- Manager: Steven Freedman
- League: East of Scotland League First Division
- 2025–26: East of Scotland League First Division, 8th of 16
Home colours	Away colours

Leith Athletic Football Club is a football club based in the Leith area of Edinburgh, Scotland. They compete in the East of Scotland Football League, First Division. First team matches are played at Meadowbank Stadium.

The present club considers itself to be a continuation of the original Leith Athletic F.C., which was founded in 1887. They played in the Scottish Football League in four different spells between 1897 and 1953, but went out of business in 1955. The name was revived at local youth level in 1996. In 2008, Leith Athletic returned to senior football when they amalgamated with Edinburgh Athletic and took the latter's place in the East of Scotland League.

== History ==
=== Original club ===
Leith Athletic were founded in 1887 in the Port of Leith. In 1891, Leith replaced Glasgow side Cowlairs in the Scottish Football League. After a reasonable start (fourth out of 12 in 1892), Leith had to apply for re-election in 1894 and 1895. They received only three votes in the latter year and were relegated to the Second Division. Leith fared rather better in the second flight, finishing second in 1896, 1897 and 1899, but they could not muster enough votes to be elected back into the First Division. In 1905, having failed again in the end of 1905 season voting, Leith Athletic were wound up and a new limited company formed to take over the old club's assets.

In 1891, Robert Clements and Matt McQueen played for Scotland against Ireland in Glasgow, McQueen having played a year earlier against Wales at Underwood Park in Paisley. Geordie Anderson, James Blessington and Robert Laing would represent the Scottish Football League against the Scottish Alliance League and the Irish League in the 1892–93 season. Blessington was transferred to Celtic in June 1893 for £20, and would gain four caps for Scotland against England and Ireland.

Now playing as Leith F.C., the team comfortably won the Scottish Second Division championship in 1906. Despite this triumph, they failed to be elected to the First Division, as runners-up Clyde and fourth placed Hamilton Academical were preferred. Leith and Raith Rovers finished level on points and were declared joint champions in 1910. Raith were promoted, but it appears that Leith did not contest the elections. The 1912–13 season saw Leith finish in last position and won re-election to stay in the league. They survived until the competition was suspended in 1915 and they joined the Eastern League.

Leith closed down for the duration of the First World War in 1916. When the club was reformed in 1919, the old name of Leith Athletic was revived and the club joined the Western League. After playing for one season (1923–24) in the Scottish Alliance, Leith were admitted to the Third Division in 1924. Leith won the Third Division championship in 1926, but failed to win election to the Second Division. The club were eliminated on the chairman's casting vote in the third ballot. It was becoming apparent that the two most prominent Edinburgh clubs, Heart of Midlothian and Hibernian were blocking attempts by Leith to progress.

The abolition of the Third Division meant that Leith had to rejoin the Scottish Alliance, but in 1927 they were admitted into the Scottish League, replacing Nithsdale Wanderers. The club's fortunes improved and they won the Second Division championship in 1930 and promotion to the First Division. Leith survived in the top division in 1931, but were relegated in 1932. The club were a middle-ranking Second Division side until the league was suspended in 1939–40.

An attempt in 1945 to revive St Bernard's, who had lost their ground in 1943 through a merger with Leith Athletic came to nothing. In 1946, Leith became founder members of the new Division C (third tier). The Second Division was expanded from 14 to 16 clubs in 1947, and Leith were elected to one of the vacancies. They were relegated in 1948, however, when the third tier was split, Leith joined Division C (North & East).

The C Divisions were made up largely of reserve teams and Leith campaigned for the non-reserve teams to be included in the Second Division. They were not successful and were expelled in August 1953, when they refused to play any more fixtures in Division C. It was too late for the club to join another competition and the club went out of business in 1955. In a supreme irony, the two C Divisions were abandoned that summer and, just as Leith had wanted, the non-reserve sides were admitted to the Second Division.

=== Modern club ===
A new Leith Athletic was formed in 1996, primarily as a club for boys football, with teams at various age groups between the ages of 5 and 21, whilst the club's adult side joined the Central Scottish Amateur Football League. In 2005, they attained their first Scottish amateur international, when Paul Lee played in a 2–1 win against Leinster. In the same year, Danny Swanson, Douglas Thom and Shaun Woodburn were capped for the Scottish Youth Football Association under-19 team, playing against Mid Ulster and Wales.

Leith Athletic amalgamated with Edinburgh Athletic in 2008 and took its place in the East of Scotland Football League. Leith were promoted to the East of Scotland Premier Division in 2011 but were relegated after one season. They regained their Premier Division place in 2013 and later won the league when it became a single division in 2015–16.

== Stadium ==
At the time of their election to the Scottish Football League in 1891, Leith played at Bank Park, which was renamed Beechwood Park in 1895. After the end of the 1898–99 season the club moved to St Bernard's' New Logie Green, where they played two league matches before moving to Hawkhill for the remainder of the 1899–1900 season.

Between 1900 and 1904 Leith played at Chancelot Park, before moving to Old Logie Green. After the SFL was suspended during World War I the club played some matches at Chancelot Park and Wardie Park. When the club returned to the SFL in 1924 they returned to Old Logie Green. At the end of the 1925–26 season the club moved again, this time to New Powderhall.

After only a season at New Powderhall, the club moved to Marine Gardens, where they remained until moving to Meadowbank in 1936. After World War II the ground required rebuilding, and Leith spent the 1946–47 season at the adjacent New Meadowbank. When the original Meadowbank was reopened, it was renamed Old Meadowbank. In the early 1950s an experimental floodlit match was played against an invitation XI including the then leading Arsenal player, Jimmy Logie.

The reformed club played at Leith Links and Muirhouse Playing Fields before moving to the Meadowbank 3G pitch adjacent to Meadowbank Stadium in 2013. When Meadowbank closed for redevelopment in December 2017, matches were relocated to Peffermill 3G.

== Former players ==
Two players from the original Leith Athletic were capped by Scotland: Matt McQueen, who made two appearances, in 1890 and 1891; and Robert Clements, capped once in 1891.

== Records ==
- Record attendance: 18,079 v East Fife, Division Two, 29 March 1930 (at Marine Gardens)

== Honours ==
East of Scotland Football League

- Winners: 2015–16

East of Scotland Qualifying Cup

- Runners-up: 2014–15

East of Scotland League Cup

- Winners: 2014–15, 2016–17
- Runners-up: 2015–16, 2017–18

King Cup

- Winners: 2015–16, 2016–17

Alex Jack Cup

- Winners: 2009–10, 2012–13, 2013–14, 2014–15, 2015–16
- Runners-up: 2017–18

=== Original club ===
Scottish Football League Division Two

- Winners: 1905–06, 1909–10, 1929–30
- Runners-up: 1895–96, 1896–97, 1898–99, 1914–15

Scottish Football League Division Three

- Runners-up: 1925–26, 1948–49

Scottish Qualifying Cup

- Winners: 1905, 1909, 1925, 1948, 1949

East of Scotland Shield

- Winners: 1900–01

Rosebery Charity Cup

- Winners: 1890–91, 1898–99, 1931–32, 1938–39

King Cup

- Winners: 1922–23
