= St Bernard's F.C. =

Former association football club in Scotland

St Bernard's
- Full name: St Bernard's Football Club
- Nickname: St Bernard
- Founded: 1878
- Dissolved: 1943
- Ground: The Meadows, Edinburgh; Powburn Park, Edinburgh; John Hope's Park, Edinburgh; Royal Gymnasium Ground, Edinburgh; New Powderhall, Edinburgh; New Logie Green, Edinburgh; Old Logie Green, Edinburgh
Home colours

St Bernard's Football Club was a football club based in Edinburgh, Scotland. The club was established in 1878 and joined the Scottish Football League. Their biggest success came in winning the 1894–95 Scottish Cup. They played at several different grounds before making the Royal Gymnasium Ground their long-term home. However, after having to sell it in 1943, the club was dissolved.

== History ==
=== Early years ===
"St Bernard's" (with an apostrophe) were one of several rugby playing clubs in Edinburgh, with matches being reported back to 1876, another being United FC. United had taken to the Association code by March 1878 and later that year merged with the still-rugby playing St Bernard's club to form an association club. The oft-repeated claim of a link with 3rd ERV is spurious as only one of their members was associated with the new club. The famous St Bernard's Well sitting on the banks of the Water of Leith nearby was taken as the badge of the club.

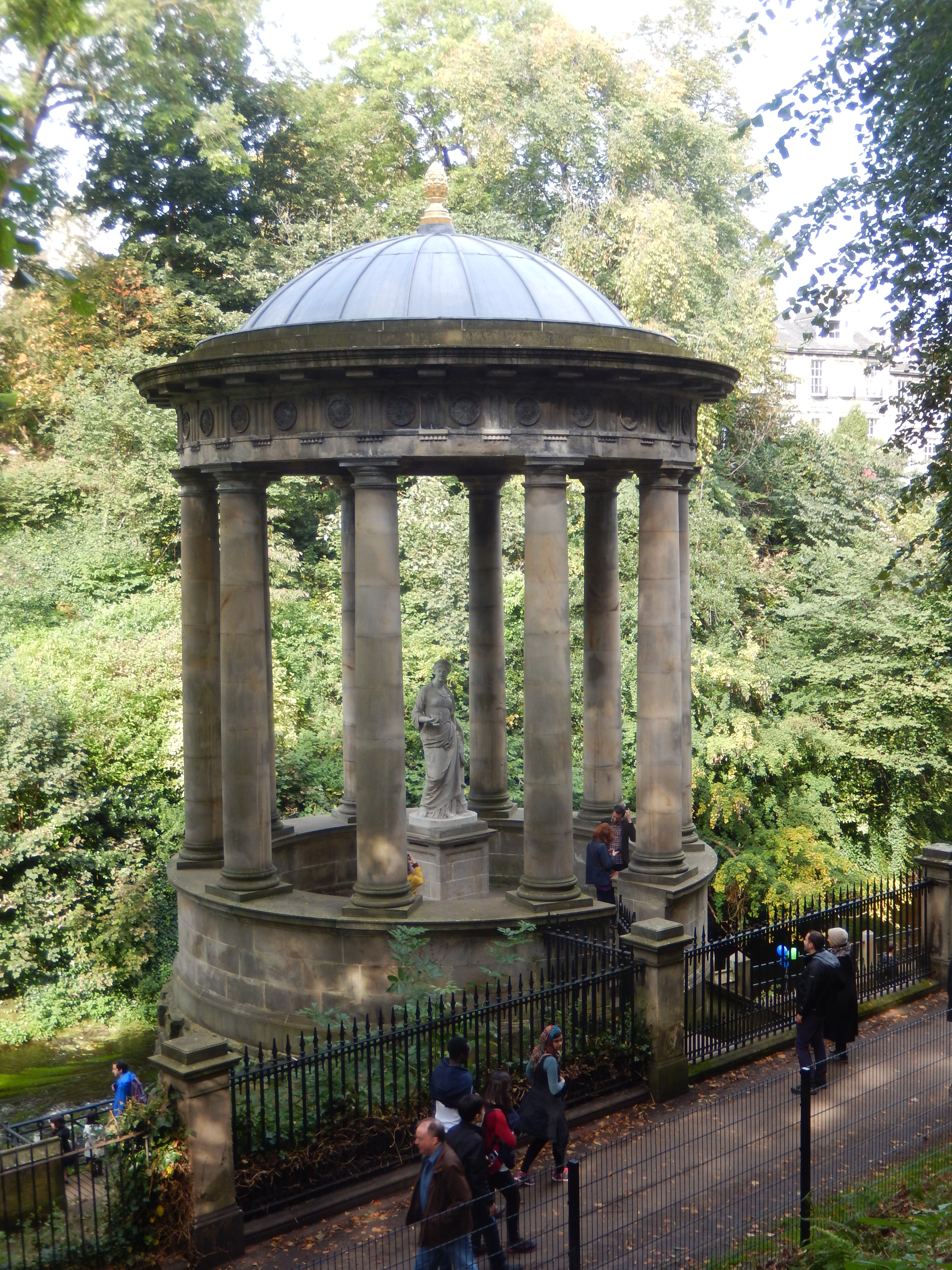
The club took its name from St Bernard's Well, a local landmark on the Water of Leith

Originally the club played at The Meadows along with Heart of Midlothian and later also Hibernian, before moving to their own ground, firstly at Powburn Park in Newington and then to John Hope's Park in Stockbridge, where its close proximity to the then playing fields of Edinburgh Academy helped them gain a following.

=== Joining The Gymmie ===
In 1880 the club transferred to the grounds of the Royal Patent Gymnasium Grounds, affectionately known as the 'Gymmie'. First built in 1864 to cater for the growing Victorian passion for healthy recreation, the Gymnasium's centrepiece was a giant rotary boat seating up to 60 rowers, although it also provided equipment for stilts, quoits and bowls, and even ice-skating in winter.

When one of Saints' founding members, William Lapsley, took over as proprietor of the Gymnasium he opted to allow Saint Bernard's exclusive use of its football pitch. Lapsley was made Honorary President of Saints, and became the driving financial force behind the club. However, the ground proved too cramped for spectators and players alike, and St Bernard's played their games first at Powderhall from 1883 (later the ground for Leith Athletic), and then to nearby New Logie Green in 1889 (which had also been used before by Heart of Midlothian and Hibernian). After a year back at Powderhall in 1900, they returned to the Royal Gymnasium by 1901.

=== Entry into the Scottish League ===
The club was involved in the discussions that led to the formation of the Scottish Football League (SFL) in 1890. The club did not play in the 1890–91 Scottish Football League season, however, as they were not elected into membership by the other clubs. In September 1890, the Scottish Football Association (SFA) expelled St Bernard's from membership for concealed professionalism. Undaunted, the club members immediately formed another club called "Edinburgh Saints" and arranged to play a friendly against Renton. The SFA refused permission for the match to proceed, but the clubs went ahead regardless. This challenged the authority of the SFA, who expelled the two clubs from membership and suspended their players for the rest of the 1890–91 season.

After a year of playing exhibition matches all over Britain they were allowed to rejoin the SFA in 1892 and played in the non-league Scottish Alliance. A year later, St Bernard's applied to join the SFL and were admitted to the First Division. Remarkably, St Bernard's finished their first season in the SFL in third place, thrashing St Mirren 8–0 and beating both Hearts and Rangers in their own grounds in the process.

=== Scottish Cup Winners in 1895's 'Edinburgh Slam' ===
Come the summer of 1895, all three Edinburgh clubs were enjoying success. Heart of Midlothian won the Scottish League for the first time, the resurrected Hibernian had won the Second Division and promotion, whilst St Bernard's had won the Scottish Cup — beating Hearts in the semi-final replay before going on to beat a young Renton side (only two of their players were over 20 years old) in the final 2–1 at Ibrox on 20 April 1895 (The winning trainer, James Wilson, left the club in 1897 and joined Glasgow Rangers as trainer 1897-1914. He died in 1914 from pneumonia). It was Honorary President William Lapsley (who had insisted that the team drank from the St Bernard's Well before going to the match) rather than club captain George Murdoch who collected and lifted the trophy before the 12,000 strong crowd — a larger one greeting the team when they returned to Edinburgh's Waverley Station later that day.

Their only other cup successes of note thereafter were winning the Scottish Qualifying Cup in 1908 and 1915.

=== Eclipse ===
However, despite the excellent facilities the Gymnasium provided for training, the dominance of Heart of Midlothian and Hibernian in the city was already beginning to tell. St Bernard's had a notably smaller band of regular followers, although some Hearts and Hibs fans would elect to go to a St Bernard's match if their own favourites were playing away. Their lower gates meant less money for wages, and so they were unable to prevent English clubs snapping up their best players. When the club reached the cup semi-final in 1896, losing 1–0 to Hearts, just five of the cup winning team were left in the line-up. Ironically, St Bernard's went on to host the 1896 Scottish Cup Final. With the other finalist being Hibernian, the SFA allowed the match to be played at New Logie Green, the only time the Scottish Cup Final has been held outside Glasgow.

In 1900, the club was relegated to the Second Division after losing a test match to St Mirren. Although St Bernard's won the Second Division at the first attempt, they were not elected to the First Division by the other clubs. The decisive disaster for the club came in 1903, when their financial benefactor William Lapsley was killed when his cab crashed after the horse bolted. In 1907 they won the Second Division again, but failed to gain election once again. In 1915, the club finished joint top once more along with Cowdenbeath and Leith Athletic, but again lost out in two test matches (neither of whom were promoted in any case).

=== The post war years ===
In 1916, the club was mothballed as the Royal Gymnasium was used by the War Department, when they were given it back the pitch was destroyed and the ground damaged: it took until 1922 and a protracted legal battle for inadequate compensation to be paid, and not until 15 November 1924 that the Royal Gymnasium was fit to play in again. In the meantime, the club took over Old Logie Green from Leith Athletic.

Furthermore, the Scottish League refused initially to have them back. Joining the rebel "Central League" (made up of other debarred sides or those objecting to the lack of automatic promotion/relegation between the two divisions), St Bernard's became part of the new Second Division when the Scottish League capitulated to its rival in 1921. Much of the credit for St Bernard's resurrection during this period must go to Tom "Brandon" Ross, who doubled as trainer and groundsman, and was the winner of the annual Powderhall New Year Sprint aged 46, but there also came unexpected help from Heart of Midlothian, who allowed St Bernard's to play at Tynecastle during this time. In 1931, a former Hearts player even donated maroon socks for the club's kit!

During the Depression, St Bernard's showed remarkable innovation in providing unemployed players with jobs whether in the Royal Gymnasium or with firms owned by the company's directors: resulting in them gaining talent that otherwise may have gone elsewhere or left football altogether. In 1928, they gained the remarkable goalkeeping talent of Edinburgh University Divinity student Leonard Small. Nicknamed "The Holy Goalie", he was later forced to give up the game by Church authorities: in later years he was appointed an OBE and became Moderator of the Church of Scotland in 1966.

=== The final years ===
In 1934–35, although still in the Second Division, St Bernard's had become a force to be reckoned with by bucking against the trend in football and concentrating on attacking football. Although this came at the expense of losing goals, it provided an exciting (and thus crowd drawing) spectacle — an idea later used successfully by George "Corky" Young at Third Lanark in the 1960s. St Bernard's missed promotion by only three points, but scored 100 goals in the process — a feat they were to repeat the next two seasons as well. In 1938 they reached the Scottish Cup semi finals, losing to eventual winners East Fife after a second replay. There was a crowd of 35,264 at Tynecastle Park — the largest ever attendance to watch a St Bernard's match.

When the Second World War began, the Scottish League was reorganised into regional leagues. At first this suited St Bernard's as they were able to enjoy matches with local rivals Heart of Midlothian and Hibernian. However, the league was shut down at the behest of Aberdeen when it was decided to put Hearts and Hibs into the same region as Celtic and Rangers. When the Eastern league was resurrected in 1942, both St Bernard's and Leith Athletic were barred from 1943 after a poor season. Their last match was on 16 May 1942, a 3–2 home defeat to East Fife. With no league to play in, it was decided to "mothball" the club until the war's close, as many other Scottish clubs had done at this time.

Disaster struck, however, when one of the directors — a coal merchant called Cooper — died later that year, and the Executors of his Will demanded the immediate repayment of a loan he'd given the club. With no means of income, the club was forced to sell the only asset it had — the Royal Gymnasium ground — leaving St Bernard's destitute.

The club was entered for the Scottish Qualifying Cup in 1946 – a gambit Abercorn had adopted under similar circumstances in 1920 – but the game never took place. The club sold their 1,200 seater stand to Leith Athletic. St Bernard's hoped that they would be allowed to play at their ground until they could find themselves a new venue, but once the stand was acquired Leith Athletic promptly refused. The St Bernard's Supporters Club started a successful boys club in 1947, but all other attempts to resurrect the club failed, and in 1951 the St Bernard's Supporters Club voted to disband and its funds to be used to provide an annual competition — the St Bernard's Cup — for local primary schools in the Edinburgh area.

Both the St Bernard's Cup and the St Bernard's Boys Club continue to this day. There have also been forays by St Bernard's into running sides in various local amateur leagues. In the 2017/18 season, the Saturday amateur team won the East of Scotland cup, one of the most prestigious trophies in the amateur game.

== Internationals ==
Eight St Bernard's players were chosen to represent Scotland between 1887 and 1897. The club's international players were as follows:

- William Baird
- Bob Foyers
- James Hutton
- James Lowe
- Duncan McLean
- James McMillan
- Jimmy Oswald
- Daniel Paton

== Colours ==
The team played in a number of kits, including blue jerseys and white knickers (from 1892 to 1900, and 1906 to 1920), white with blue knickers (from 1878 to 1892), the "Rosebery" colours (pink and gold hoops) between 1900 and 1903, and blue and white hoops (from 1924). The current boys and amateur club use all four for each of their teams.

== Honours ==
- Scottish Cup
  - Winners: 1894–95
- Scottish Football League Division Two
  - Winners: 1900–01, 1906–07
- Scottish Qualifying Cup
  - Winners: 1907, 1914
- East of Scotland Shield
  - Winners: 1875–76, 1896–97
- Rosebery Charity Cup
  - Winners: 1907–08, 1914–15, 1930–31, 1937–38
- Dunedin Cup
  - Winners: 1909–10
