= 1895–96 British Home Championship =

Tournament details
- Host country: England, Ireland, Scotland and Wales
- Dates: 29 February – 4 April 1896
- Teams: 4

Final positions
- Champions: Scotland (8th title)
- Runners-up: England

Tournament statistics
- Matches played: 6
- Goals scored: 32 (5.33 per match)
- Top scorer: (England) Steve Bloomer (6 goals)

The 1895–96 British Home Championship was an edition of the annual international football tournament played between the British Home Nations. Despite England achieving an almost record 9–1 victory over Wales, the trophy was won by Scotland who won two and drew one of their matches, the draw coming in a hard-fought duel with Ireland.

Wales and Ireland kicked off the tournament with the Welsh heavily defeating the Irish in Wrexham. England too beat the Irish in their opening game, although by a smaller scoreline and England then achieved their 9–1 victory over Wales with Steve Bloomer scoring five, an England record. Scotland too beat Wales, scoring four without reply before being held by the Irish in an exciting and close match.

In the final game at Celtic Park, England and Scotland played for the trophy, England only needing a draw whilst the Scots required a win to take the tournament. To improve their chances, Scotland decided to select England-based players for the first time, holding a selection trial between their 'Home' and 'Anglo' players which became an annual event for the next 30 years. In a close and dramatic game, Scotland narrowly beat the English 2–1 and won the championship. The decisive Scotland v England match, watched by a crowd of 60,000, generated receipts of £3,640, a world record at the time for a football match.

== Table ==
Team	Pld	W	D	L	GF	GA	GD	Pts
Scotland (C)	3	2	1	0	9	4	+5	5
England	3	2	0	1	12	3	+9	4
Wales	3	1	0	2	7	14	−7	2
Ireland	3	0	1	2	4	11	−7	1

Rules for classification: 1) points. The points system worked as follows: 2 points for a win and 1 point for a draw.
(C) Champions

== Results ==
29 February 1896

Wales	6–1	Ireland
Lewis 9', 20'; Meredith 23', 84'; Pugh 60'; Morris 34'		Turner 70'

Racecourse Ground, Wrexham
Attendance: 3,000
Referee: James Cooper(England)

7 March 1896

Ireland	0–2	England
		Smith 40'; Bloomer 75'

Solitude, Belfast
Attendance: 12,000
Referee: James Robertson (Scotland)

16 March 1896

Wales	1–9	England
Chapman 65'		Bloomer 25', 40', 60', 83', 89'; Smith 15', 44'; Bassett 33'; Goodall 80'

Arms Park, Cardiff
Attendance: 10,000
Referee: Tom Robertson (Scotland)

21 March 1896

Scotland	4–0	Wales
Neil 19', 71'; Keillor 30'; Paton 59'

Carolina Port, Dundee
Attendance: 11,700
Referee: Joseph McBride (Ireland)

28 March 1896

Ireland	3–3	Scotland
Barron 20', 32'; Milne 43' (pen.)		McColl 7', 25'; Murray 78'

Solitude, Belfast
Attendance: 8,000
Referee: James Cooper (England)

4 April 1896

Scotland	2–1	England
Lambie 22'; Bell 33'		Bassett 80'

Celtic Park, Glasgow
Attendance: 51,345
Referee: Humphrey Percy Jones (Wales)

== Winning squad ==
- Scotland

Name	Apps/Goals by opponent			Total	
Name	(Wales) WAL	(Ireland) IRE	(England) ENG	Apps	Goals
Bob McColl	1	1/2		2	2
William Lambie		1	1/1	2	1
James Blessington		1	1	2	0
Jock Drummond		1	1	2	0
Neilly Gibson		1	1	2	0
George Hogg		1	1	2	0
Alex King	1		1	2	0
Bobby Neill	1/2			1	2
Jack Bell			1/1	1	1
Pat Murray		1/1		1	1
Sandy Keillor	1/1			1	1
Daniel Paton	1/1			1	1
Tom Brandon			1	1	0
Jimmy Cowan			1	1	0
Ned Doig			1	1	0
Thomas Hyslop			1	1	0
Kenneth Anderson		1		1	0
John Cameron		1		1	0
James Kelly		1		1	0
Peter Meehan		1		1	0
William Blair	1			1	0
John Gillespie	1			1	0
Robert Glen	1			1	0
Rab Macfarlane	1			1	0
Duncan McLean	1			1	0
William Thomson	1			1	0
