= 1895–96 Dumbarton F.C. season =

Dumbarton
1895–96 season
- Stadium: Boghead Park, Dumbarton
- Scottish League Division One: 10th
- Scottish Cup: Second Round
- Top goalscorer: League: Bell (7); All: Bell (7)
Home colours

The 1895–96 season was the 23rd Scottish football season in which Dumbarton competed at national level, entering the Scottish Football League and the Scottish Cup. In addition Dumbarton played in the Dumbartonshire Cup.

== Story of the season ==
=== August ===
Dumbarton's first outing of the season was a formidable one with Rangers visiting Boghead on 17 August on league business. Rangers had never won at Dumbarton, and despite the fact that the new team were an untried unit, the Sons went into an early 2–0 lead with both goals scored by Saunderson. Nevertheless, Rangers talent would come through and they scored four goals before half time. The final score was a disappointing, though hardly unexpected, 5–3 loss.

A week later Dumbarton travelled to meet Dundee in the league at Carolina Park. In a disappointing performance the Sons were well beaten in a 4–1 defeat.

The last day of the month saw the two clubs who were so far pointless in the league meet at Boghead – and it was the Sons who came out best against Clyde in a nine-goal thriller 5–4.

At the other end of the league table it was Celtic who were making the early running with 6 points from their first 4 games.

=== September ===
On 7 September the destination was Logie Green to play St Bernards. The Edinburgh side were currently in fine form having dropped just one point from their first 3 matches, but they found the Sons more than a handful as the visitors built up an early 2–0 lead. The stamina of the professionals however was to tell and in the end the home side escaped with a rather fortunate 4–3 win.

The following Saturday saw Dumbarton at home to entertain St Mirren, and in a spirited performance it was two consecutive home wins with a 4–2 victory.

On 21 September it was away to Edinburgh, to Easter Road against Hibernian. At half time Dumbarton were well in the game being only 2–3 behind but in the second half the Sons had no answer to the powerful Hibs front men and at full time the home team had added four more goals for a 7–2 win.

The final league game of September was another big challenge as Celtic visited Boghead. Things got tougher before the match began as Dumbarton had to draft in two players (Black and Reid) from Newtown Thistle, to replace Saunderson and Weir on the left wing. Nevertheless, if Celtic thought that they might copy Hibernian's goal feast of the previous week, then they were mistaken. Although two goals down early on, the Sons got one back, from the replacement Black, by half time. Celtic scored a third, but Nash replied for Dumbarton and in the end were unlucky not to earn at least a point.

So the league positions after 7 games showed Hibernian at the top with 11 points, a point ahead of Hearts and Celtic. Dumbarton were in 8th place with 4 points.

=== October ===
October opened with a trip to Cathkin Park to play Third Lanark in the league. Once again there were forced changes in the team due to the departure of James Hartley to Sunderland. So with Saunderson still unavailable a reshuffle was required and new boy Morrice from Newtown Thistle was introduced at right back. Alex Miller at left back celebrated his 100th appearance in a Dumbarton shirt but the other changes had an unsettling effect and in a disappointing game Dumbarton went down to a 5–2 defeat.

On 12 October Dumbarton had a break from competitive football and arranged to play a friendly against Alliance League side Royal Albert in Larkhall. Unfortunately the home forwards were none too 'friendly' and the Sons came away after a sound 5–1 beating.

The following Saturday it was back to league business with a home tie against champions Hearts. Again changes to the team were required with another new face at right back – Campbell from the reserves – and Nash was also missing. It was not unexpected that the Sons would struggle and so it was as they received a 9–2 thrashing.

On 26 October it was another home fixture and again against an Edinburgh side, this time St Bernards. The Dumbarton team showed yet another change with John Gillan – an Aston Villa reserve - being played at centre half. The Saints had, like the Sons, been having a poor season but in a game which raged from one end of the field to the other it was the homesters that came out on top by 4–3.

At the end of October Hibernian, Celtic and Hearts were equal at the top of the league on 16 points from 11 games. Dumbarton stayed in 8th place but now had 6 points.

=== November ===
The first Saturday in November saw Dumbarton on their travels again attempting to break their 'duck' away from home. This time the team to face St Mirren was unchanged from the week before and while the first half was a drab affair but as soon as Dumbarton scored a minute into the second half the play improved and after an exciting 45 minutes the Sons held on for a 2–1 win and their first 2 points on the road.

On 9 November Dumbarton entertained Hibernian at Boghead and hoped to improve on the away fixture in September. The team showed one change with Miller coming back in at left back in place of Thomson. However, on the day luck was to desert the Sons by losing Nash in the first half and Hendry in the second to injuries. Nevertheless, the remaining players made an impressive showing and only lost out to the league leaders by 3–1.

The following weekend Dumbarton welcomed county neighbours Newtown Thistle for a friendly. The match was a poor one but at the finish the Sons chalked up another victory by 2–1.

On 23 November, for a consecutive week, it was a friendly fixture, this time with a trip to play Second Division strugglers Motherwell. There was another new face in at centre forward, Hugh McIlhany replacing James Stevenson who had moved south to join Preston North End, but it was the home team that started strongly and by half time were 3–0 up. Dumbarton improved in the second half and replied with two goals but were unable to find an equaliser and thus lost 3–2.

The final game of November was played at Barrowfield against Clyde. The team was missing Gracie at centre forward and Docherty in goal and in their place came Samuel Woods from Greenock Morton and Richardson from the reserves. The home tie in August had been a thriller but this time it was mostly one way traffic with Clyde easing past a poor Dumbarton side 5–1.

The league now had Celtic pulling ahead at the top with 22 points from 14 games – four in front of Hibs and Hearts. Dumbarton maintained 8th place with 8 points.

=== December ===
On 7 December Dumbarton welcomed Dundee to play their return league fixture. Back in the team was regular goalkeeper Docherty and it was good thing too as he saved the Sons from a sound beating. Nevertheless, Dundee left Boghead with both points after a 2–1 win.

A week later it was another home fixture, this time against Third Lanark. With inside right Woods missing, Hugh Malloy from Abercorn was brought in. The game was an exciting one with Docherty again playing exceptionally in goal but in the end the stamina of the professionals told and the game finished 4–2 in their favour.

Celtic, the league leaders, at Parkhead can be no tougher challenge and this is what Dumbarton faced on 21 December. Woods replaced Weir on the left wing but in front of a meagre crowd the result was never in doubt and the Celts ran out easy 3–0 victors.

Dumbarton's match against Hearts a week later fell victim to the weather, so at the end of 1895 it was Celtic who were in control at the top of the league with 28 points from 17 games, and Rangers 8 points behind with 3 games in hand. Dumbarton had slipped to 9th with 8 points, the same as Clyde in 8th and St Mirren in 10th.

=== January ===
Dumbarton travelled north for the New Year holidays and played Arbroath and Victoria United (Aberdeen) on 1 and 2 January. Unfortunately the Sons losing streak continued with 3–0 and 8–0 defeats respectively.

On 4 January Dumbarton headed to Ibrox to play their penultimate league fixture. Rangers were still in with a chance of the title assuming they won all their remaining games. The Dumbarton team showed two changes with McNicol replacing Thomson at right back and Hastings stepping up from the reserves to take Nash's place. Surprisingly Saunderson put Dumbarton into the lead but by half time Rangers had equalised and despite another splendid display from Docherty in goals Rangers superior stamina told in the end as they strolled to a 3–1 win.

After a postponement due to bad weather, Dumbarton got their Scottish Cup campaign off and running on 18 January. Coincidentally it was Rangers again but this time at Boghead. Thomson and Nash returned to the team and in a brilliant display which had been lacking for some time, Dumbarton were within three minutes of creating the biggest upset of the season. Woods had scored early in the second half to give Dumbarton the lead only for Rangers to secure a replay with a last gasp equaliser.

A week later it was back to Ibrox and another shock looked on as Dumbarton took a first-minute lead through a McIlhany goal. However, as had been the case earlier in the month, the professionals changed up a gear and moved into the next round of the cup with a 3–1 victory.

=== February ===
On 1 February Dumbarton had a week free from league and cup commitments and travelled to Edinburgh to play Leith Athletic. Unfortunately Dumbarton played poorly apart from keeper Docherty and despite his performance the home team won 5–0.

The following Saturday it was county cup duty as Dumbarton took on Newtown Thistle at Boghead in the semi-final. Although the 'juniors' opened the scoring Dumbarton were soon in control and ran out comfortable 5–1 winners.

Hearts and Dumbarton finished off their respective league campaigns on 15 February at Tynecastle. The Sons were anchored at the bottom of the league and this showed as there was never a serious challenge mounted and the Hearts were untroubled in a 7–0 rout.

Following a free week, on 29 February it was the battle of the wooden spooners as Dumbarton travelled to Greenock to play Morton who had finished bottom of the Second Division. At half time the Sons led 3–2 but in a miserable second half performance the Sons were completely outplayed and were deservedly beaten 7–3, although losing Campbell to injury with the score at 3–3 did not help.

=== March ===
The first weekend in March was a quiet one for competitive matches as international trials were being held, however the bad news for Dumbarton was that Miller had decided to move to Small Heath. With Docherty trialling with Celtic the Sons defence was in poor shape losing such talent.

On 14 March it was the final of the Dumbartonshire Cup. Dumbarton were attempting to retain the cup for the eighth successive year, but while the Sons season had been a poor one, Renton's had been successful – not only riding high in the Second Division but also semi finalists in the Scottish Cup. Once only second in importance to the national competition, the county cup had lost much of its appeal, nonetheless a crowd of 4,000 turned up to witness the contest. Renton were at full strength while Dumbarton were missing a few first teamers – and while the Sons kept things level until half time, Renton piled on the pressure in the second half and won comfortably by 3–0.

After a free week, Dumbarton took on St Mirren at Paisley on 28 March in a friendly fixture. The Sons had won both the league fixtures against the Buddies but in a ‘wretched’ display Dumbarton were overwhelmed by an average St Mirren side 7–1.

=== April ===
A friendly against Linthouse was planned for 4 April, but it was decided to cancel in view of the Scotland v England international on the same day.

The following week Dumbarton travelled to play a friendly against local team Helesburgh and in a high scoring game came out on top 4–3.

On 20 April it was on the road again to play Linthouse and once more it was a successful trip as a 2–0 victory was recorded.

Dumbarton's final game of the season was played a week later against Renton at Boghead – a chance for revenge for the county cup defeat. However it was the visitors who came away best with a 2–1 win.

=== May ===
On 26 May the Scottish League met to decide on promotion and relegation issues between the bottom three clubs of the First Division and the top three clubs of the Second Division. Dumbarton's case for remaining in the top flight was poor this being the second successive season that they were up for election – and so relegation it was, with Abercorn replacing the Sons. Full election results as follows:

Team	Votes	Result
Clyde	14	Re-elected to First Division
St Mirren	13	Re-elected to First Division
Abercorn	8	Promoted from Second Division
Leith Athletic	4	Not promoted to First Division
Dumbarton	2	Relegated to Second Division
Renton	1	Not promoted to First Division

The relegation had repercussions as Alex Lawrence had to give up the presidency of the Scottish League due to the fact that the chair had to be held by a representative of a First Division club.

=== June ===
Better news came at the SFA meeting on 2 June when Dumbarton were selected as one of the 12 clubs exempted from qualifying for the Scottish Cup next season.

== Match results ==
=== Scottish League ===
17 August 1895 Scottish League	Dumbarton	3–5	Rangers	Boghead Park
	Saunderson; Boyle		Miller; Barker; Smith, A

24 August 1895 Scottish League	Dundee	4–1	Dumbarton	Carolina Port
	Gilligan 1'; Dundas (pen.)		Saunderson	Attendance: 2,000; Referee: Mr McLaughlin

31 August 1895 Scottish League	Dumbarton	5–4	Clyde	Boghead Park
	Hartley; Thomson, D (pen.) weir Bell		Gray, H Young; Thomson, D (o.g.)

7 September 1895 Scottish League	St Bernard's	4–3	Dumbarton	New Logie Green
	Cleland 60'; Miller (o.g.); Brown 75'		Thomson; Weir; Hartley 90'	Attendance: 2,000; Referee: Mr Watt

14 September 1895 Scottish League	Dumbarton	4–2	St Mirren	Boghead Park
	Hartley; Saunderson; Stevenson 45'		Milligan; Hurry

21 September 1895 Scottish League	Hibernian	7–2	Dumbarton	Easter Road Stadium
	Whyte; Kennedy; Neill (pen.)		Weir	Attendance: 1,500; Referee: J Muir

28 September 1895 Scottish League	Dumbarton	2–3	Celtic	Boghead Park
	Black; Nash		Divers; Blessington scrimmage	Attendance: 4,000; Referee: Mr Dickson

5 October 1895 Scottish League	Third Lanark	5–2	Dumbarton	Cathkin Park
	Steel 5'; McCall; Peddie; Fyfe		Stevenson; Nash

19 October 1895 Scottish League	Dumbarton	2–9	Hearts	Boghead Park
	Saunderson; Boyle		King; Baird; Mackie; Walker 46'; Taylor	Attendance: 1,200; Referee: J McLaughlin

26 October 1895 Scottish League	Dumbarton	4–3	St Bernard's	Boghead Park
	Gracie 39'; Weir 44'; Bell		Laing; Wilson; Cleland	Attendance: 1,000; Referee: Mr Henry

2 November 1895 Scottish League	St Mirren	1–2	Dumbarton	Love Street (stadium)
	Wylie		Bell	Referee: Mr J Campbell

9 November 1895 Scottish League	Dumbarton	1–3	Hibernian	Boghead Park
	Bell		Ferguson; Neill 44'; Broslin

30 November 1895 Scottish League	Clyde	5–1	Dumbarton	Barrowfield Park
	Daly 5' (pen.); Paterson; Crawford, A 70'; Leslie		Woods	Referee: Mr AB McKenzie

7 December 1895 Scottish League	Dumbarton	1–2	Dundee	Boghead Park
	McIlhany		Vail; Thomson	Attendance: 500; Referee: Mr McKenzie

14 December 1895 Scottish League	Dumbarton	2–4	Third Lanark	Boghead Park
	Bell		Garside; Peddie

21 December 1895 Scottish League	Celtic	3–0	Dumbarton	Celtic Park
	Martin 4'; McMahon 44'; Doyle (pen.)			Attendance: 1,300; Referee: J Marshall

14 January 1896 Scottish League	Rangers	3–1	Dumbarton	Ibrox Park
	Oswald; McCreadie; Miller (o.g.)		Saunderson	Attendance: 2,000

15 February 1896 Scottish League	Hearts	7–0	Dumbarton	Tynecastle Stadium
	Walker; Taylor; Walls; Russell; King; Chambers			Attendance: 2,500; Referee: Mr McLeod

=== Scottish Cup ===
18 January 1896 Cup R1	Dumbarton	1–1	Rangers	Boghead Park
	Woods		Stewart 89'

25 January 1896 Cup R1	Dumbarton	3–1	Rangers	Boghead Park
	Smith, A Oswald		McIlhany	Attendance: 6,000

=== Dumbartonshire Cup ===
8 February 1896 Semi-final	Dumbarton	5–1	Newtown Thistle	Boghead Park
	Malloy; Boyle; Nash		Goal

14 March 1896 Final	Dumbarton	0–3	Renton	Boghead Park
			Price 55'	Attendance: 4,000

=== Friendlies ===
12 October 1895 Friendly	Royal Albert	5–1	Dumbarton	Raploch Park
	<McMaster 30'; Steel; Morrison		Goal

16 November 1895 Friendly	Dumbarton	2–1	Newtown Thistle	Boghead Park
	Weir		Goal

23 November 1895 Friendly	Motherwell	3–2	Dumbarton	Dalziel Park (stadium)
	Ferguson 5'; Edgar 10'		Stevenson

1 January 1896 Friendly	Arbroath	3–0	Dumbarton	Gayfield Park
	McGlashan; Nicholl; Hutton

2 January 1896 Friendly	Victoria United	8–0	Dumbarton	Wellington Bridge Grounds, Aberdeen
	Ritchie; Smith; McConnachie			Referee: Mr Dorian

1 February 1896 Friendly	Leith Athletic	5–0	Dumbarton	Beechwood Park (Leith)
	Walker; Brown

29 February 1896 Friendly	Morton	7–3	Dumbarton	Cappielow Park
	Rennie; Davidson		Saunderson

28 March 1896 Friendly	St Mirren	7–1	Dumbarton	Love Street (stadium)
	Stevenson; Milligan; Wylie		46'

11 April 1896 Friendly	Helensburgh	3–4	Dumbarton	Ardencaple Park
	Goal		Goal

18 April 1896 Friendly	Linthouse	0–2	Dumbarton	Langlands Park (Govan)
			Woods

25 April 1896 Friendly	Dumbarton	1–2	Renton	Boghead Park
	Goal		Goal

== Player statistics ==
=== Players ===
With a combination of dwindling crowds and funds together with the inability to attract the best players, the decision was made to return the club to amateur status.

Despite the fact that the bulk of the first team backed the decision, a number of players made the move elsewhere, with Tom Keir heading to Hearts, John McLeod to Rangers, James Stevenson to Preston North End as well as Hugh Craig who also travelled south of the border and Tom McMillan who retired.

So the new season began with a number of new faces in the first XI, most stepping up from the reserves but included John Docherty (goalkeeper) from Vale of Leven.

No.	Pos	Nat	Player	Total		First Division		Scottish Cup	
No.	Pos	Nat	Player	Apps	Goals	Apps	Goals	Apps	Goals
	GK	(Scotland) SCO	Robert Colquhoun	1	0	1	0	0	0
	GK	(Scotland) SCO	John Docherty	18	0	16	0	2	0
	GK	(Scotland) SCO	Richardson	1	0	1	0	0	0
	DF	(Scotland) SCO	Campbell	4	0	4	0	0	0
	DF	(Scotland) SCO	John McNicol	5	0	4	0	1	0
	DF	(Scotland) SCO	Alex Miller	16	0	14	0	2	0
	DF	(Scotland) SCO	Henry Mitchell	1	0	1	0	0	0
	DF	(Scotland) SCO	Daniel Thomson	17	2	15	2	2	0
	DF	(Scotland) SCO	Morrice	1	0	1	0	0	0
	MF	(Scotland) SCO	John Gillan	11	0	9	0	2	0
	MF	(Scotland) SCO	Hastings	2	0	2	0	0	0
	MF	(Scotland) SCO	Robert Hendry	18	0	16	0	2	0
	MF	(Scotland) SCO	Billy Nash	16	2	15	2	1	0
	MF	(Scotland) SCO	St Clair	8	0	8	0	0	0
	FW	(Scotland) SCO	Bell	12	7	12	7	0	0
	FW	(Scotland) SCO	Black	2	1	2	1	0	0
	FW	(Scotland) SCO	William Boyle	3	2	3	2	0	0
	FW	(Scotland) SCO	James Gracie	6	1	4	1	2	0
	FW	(Scotland) SCO	Jimmy Hartley	7	4	7	4	0	0
	FW	(Scotland) SCO	Henry Malloy	4	0	2	0	2	0
	FW	(Scotland) SCO	McDavid	1	0	1	0	0	0
	FW	(Scotland) SCO	Hugh McIlhany	8	2	6	1	2	1
	FW	(Scotland) SCO	McIntyre	1	0	1	0	0	0
	FW	(Scotland) SCO	Thomas Reid	2	0	2	0	0	0
	FW	(Scotland) SCO	Albert Saunderson	18	5	16	5	2	0
	FW	(Scotland) SCO	John Seaton	8	0	8	0	0	0
	FW	(Scotland) SCO	James Stevenson	12	3	12	3	0	0
	FW	(Scotland) SCO	Hugh Weir	10	6	10	6	0	0
	FW	(Scotland) SCO	Samuel Woods	7	2	5	1	2	1

== Reserve team ==
Dumbarton lost in the second round of the Scottish Second XI Cup to Third Lanark.
