= 1892–93 Dumbarton F.C. season =

Dumbarton
1892–93 season
- Stadium: Boghead Park, Dumbarton
- Scottish Football League: 7th
- Scottish Cup: Second Round
- Top goalscorer: League: Lawrence Bell (9); All: Lawrence Bell (11)
Home colours

The 1892–93 season was the 20th Scottish football season in which Dumbarton competed at a national level, entering the Scottish Football League and the Scottish Cup. In addition Dumbarton played in the Dunbartonshire Cup and the Glasgow Charity Cup.

== Story of the Season ==
=== June–July ===
A close season tournament was played for the benefit of Port Glasgow AFC and on 27 June Dumbarton defeated the hosts 7–2, whilst in the other tie, Rangers got the better of Clyde by 4–0.

On 9 July the final of the Port Glasgow benefit tournament was played at Ibrox, but with the loss of Taylor early in the game who was ordered off for kicking the Rangers goalkeeper, Rangers were rarely troubled and ran out winners by 4–1.

=== August ===
The 1892–93 season opened on 13 August with a friendly fixture in Dumfries against 5th KRV, and whilst the team was composed mostly of 2nd XI players, Dumbarton still managed a win by 3–2.

The league season opened a week later with a home tie against St Mirren. The loss of the backbone of the team – added to the three who had travelled south were Taylor who was suspended and McMillan who had yet to decide on his future, meant that the unbeaten league record at ‘fatal’ Boghead would be sorely tested and so it proved with the visitors leaving as the winners by 2–1.

On the 27th, Dumbarton travelled to Ayr to play a friendly, and in a foul strewn game came away with a 1–1 draw.

=== September ===
On 3 September Dumbarton had the unenviable task of a visit on league business to Ibrox, and while most pundits expected an easy Rangers win, with the return of McMillan to the fold, Dumbarton put up a strong performance, and although leading twice eventually succumbed by 3–2.

The following week saw the visit of Leith Athletic to Boghead, and whilst the game was not great, a 2–1 win ensured that Dumbarton gained their first league points of the season.

It was meant to be a league visit to neighbours Renton on 20 September, but as the referee failed to appear, a friendly was played, which Dumbarton won 2–0.

A week later, despite having most of the play, Dumbarton allowed Third Lanark to leave Boghead with both points in the league encounter, the latter winning 2–1.

So at the end of the month, Hearts topped the league table with 11 points from 6 games, 2 ahead of Rangers who had a game in hand. Dumbarton trailed in 8th with 2 points from 4 games played.

=== October ===
On 1 October, Dumbarton played their return league fixture at Paisley against St Mirren. The match was an even one, and Dumbarton went in at half time 2-1 ahead. However Smith was lost to injury early in the second half and despite scoring a third goal which was disallowed, it was St Mirren that made their 1-man advantagetell by winning 3–2.

The following week Dumbarton travelled to play Hearts at Tynecastle. Hearts had been going well in the league, but the introduction of David Thomson and Lawrence Bell to the team, and the return from suspension of Taylor, made a huge difference to the Dumbarton performance, who were well worthy of their 3–1 win.

Following on from the previous week's success, Dumbarton looked forward to a home tie against Celtic with an unchanged team. However the Celts completely dominated the game and left Boghead with a 3–0 win.

On 24 October, Abercorn were the visitors to Boghead and were soundly thrashed 5-1 – Dumbarton's biggest win of the season so far. Interestingly, McLeod left his usual position of goalkeeper to play centre forward in the first half of the game, with Hartley taking his place between the sticks.

A week later brought a visit to Boghead by neighbours Renton for a friendly fixture and ended in a 2–1 win for Dumbarton.

So at the end of the month Rangers still led the league with 14 points from 8 games, ahead of Hearts a point behind with a game more played. Dumbarton remained in 8th place with 6 points from 8 games.

=== November ===
The return fixture against Third Lanark was played at Cathkin Park on 5 November. Dumbarton were missing Keir and J. Bell due to injury and this showed as a 3–0 defeat was suffered.

The following week there was a rest for the club, but not for all the players. John McLeod, Tom McMillan, William Thomson, John Taylor, Abe Hartley and James McNaught were all selected to play in the Dumbartonshire representative team against a Renfrewshire XI at Abercorn's ground. The match was drawn 2–2 with Taylor scoring one of the goals.

A return to a full strength squad did not have the desired effect on 19 November as Dumbarton lost away to Leith Athletic by 3–0. Notwithstanding the score, Dumbarton had most of the play but were met by a ‘superlative’ display by the Leith goalkeeper.

The 26 November saw Dumbarton visit Clyde for their first game in the Scottish Cup. Unfortunately the weather had turned Barrowfield Park into a ‘series of small lakes’, nevertheless a friendly was played which Clyde won 4–1.

So at the end of November the league was still led by Rangers with 15 points from 9 games, with Celtic and Hearts 2 points behind. Dumbarton still held on to 8th place with 6 points from 10 games.

=== December ===
The first two Saturdays in December were written off due to wintry weather, but at the fourth time of asking the outstanding Scottish Cup tie against Clyde was eventually played off on 17 December. However, with Dumbarton leading 6-1 twenty minutes into the second half, the home crowd invaded the pitch assaulting the referee and some of the Dumbarton players. The referee was unable to continue and the game suspended. However at a subsequent SFA meeting the tie was awarded to Dumbarton.

It was supposed to be a return to league duty a week later with Rangers visiting Boghead, but again the weather intervened.

And so the final game of 1892 would be the first of Dumbarton's holiday matches with a fine 5–1 away win against Kirkcaldy.

=== January ===
The holiday success at Kirkcaldy was followed by friendly wins over Dunfermline (5–0) and Hearts (2–0) on 2 and 3 January respectively.

The following Saturday was supposed to see Rangers visit Dumbarton for a Scottish Cup tie but once again a postponement was necessary due to an unplayable pitch. The same was the case a week later.

The long-awaited match took place on 21 January and not for the first time this season it was a case of an inspired goalkeeper who kept the Dumbarton forwards at bay and Rangers left with a 1–0 win. A protest from Dumbarton that the referee ended the match 3 minutes early was subsequently withdrawn. On the same day however it was better news for the second XI as the Dumbarton Rangers defeated the Union reserves to secure the county cup.

On 28 January, neighbours Vale of Leven came to Boghead on county cup business, and despite having most of the play Dumbarton had to settle for a 1–1 draw.

=== February ===
Dumbarton answered the doubters in the replay of the semi-final of the Dumbartonshire Cup on 4 February at Alexandria by recording a fine 6–2 win.

A week later, and being free of league and cup duties, Dumbarton travelled over the Irish Channel to play Linfield Athletic. The 4–2 defeat suffered may have had something to do with the rough journey over to Ireland as most of the Dumbarton team were seasick and had barely recovered when play commenced.

It was back to league business on 18 February where Dumbarton travelled to Barrowfield and came away with a 2–1 victory.

The chance to bring silverware back to Boghead was not missed as on 25 February Dumbarton easily defeated Levendale 7–1 to lift the county cup for the fifth year in succession.

=== March ===
International trial matches were held on 4 March to consider selection of teams to represent Scotland in the upcoming Home International Championship - John McLeod and John Taylor took part. Despite this, the league match against Renton went ahead on the same day. The result of a 1–1 draw was a fair one – bearing in mind that Renton were also short of men for the international trials. Although the absence of McNaught who had travelled south, in addition to the ‘trialists’ and the sending off of Lawrence Bell in the second half did not help Dumbarton's cause.

With the final of the Scottish Cup being played at Hampden, Dumbarton journeyed to London on 11 March to play the Royal Arsenal. Unfortunately while a 3–1 defeat was suffered, the game had other consequences in that the club's president Denny resigned due to his pro-amateurism stance.

On 18 March, McLeod, Thomson and John Bell played for Scotland against Wales in an 8–0 victory for the Scots. It was unsurprising then that these men were sorely missed in the league match played against Celtic at Parkhead on the same day – a heavy 5–1 beating being handed out.

The following week Dumbarton made the trip to Edinburgh to play Hibs in a friendly and in an evenly contested match it was the home team who took the spoils 3–2.

So the league at the end of March looked like this; Rangers played 13 with 22 points; St Mirren played 16 with 20 points; Celtic played 12 with 19 points. Dumbarton were stuck in 8th with 9 points from 13 games.

=== April ===
On the first day of April Dumbarton welcomed Hearts to Boghead and achieved a convincing 5–1 win. This would mark John Bell's last game for Dumbarton and his goal scoring skills would be sadly missed.

So a week later, while the club had a rest weekend, John Bell and John Taylor earned their second 'League' caps in the Scottish League XI vs. the English League match at Parkhead - the game finishing in a 4–3 win for the English, with Taylor scoring one of the goals.

On 15 April, Clyde visited Boghead in the league and left having been defeated 3-1 – the first time Dumbarton had strung two successive victories together all season.

A week later it was Rangers turn to come to Dumbarton – league leaders with an unbeaten record to date but never having won at Boghead – and it was Dumbarton who would triumph in a stunning 3–0 victory.

However the successful run came to an abrupt end on 29 April, when a visit to Abercorn in the penultimate league game ended in a dismal 4–0 defeat.

So at the end of the month Rangers still topped the league with 26 points, with one game left to play, but Celtic were only 3 points behind with 3 games in hand. Dumbarton maintained 8th place with 15 points.

=== May ===
Tuesday 2 May was an important date for Scottish football as it was on this date that the SFA officially accepted professionalism within the sport - Dumbarton was one of the few dissenting voices.

Following a free week, Dumbarton travelled to Cathkin Park to meet Celtic in the semi-final of the Glasgow Charity Cup, and a close encounter finished in a 0–0 draw. Four days later at the same venue however it was Celtic that prevailed by 3–1.

And so on 20 May, the last league game of the season took place at Tontine Park, where Dumbarton defeated Renton handsomely by 4–0.

The result meant that Dumbarton leap-frogged Renton into 7th place in the league, and thereby avoided the dreaded reselection process – and it was Celtic who claimed their first ever championship, pipping Rangers by a single point.

=== June ===
At the club's AGM a motion to adopt professionalism for the following season was passed.

== Match results ==
=== Scottish League ===
20 August 1892 Scottish League	Dumbarton	1–2	St Mirren	Boghead Park
	Gillan		Harrison 10'; Mullen	Referee: J Marshall

3 September 1892 Scottish League	Rangers	3–2	Dumbarton	Ibrox Park
	Bruce; Barker		Hartley 1'; Thomson, W	Attendance: 6,000; Referee: Mr Allison

10 September 1892 Scottish League	Dumbarton	2–1	Leith Athletic	Boghead Park
	Bell, L		Cleghorn	Attendance: 1,500; Referee: Mr McNicol

24 September 1892 Scottish League	Dumbarton	1–2	Third Lanark	Boghead Park
	Hartley		Mackay 20'; Boyd	Attendance: 1,500; Referee: Mr Allison

1 October 1892 Scottish League	St Mirren	3–2	Dumbarton	Westmarch (stadium)
	Shaw; McLean		Bell, J Taylor	Referee: J Marshall

8 October 1892 Scottish League	Hearts	1–3	Dumbarton	Tynecastle Stadium
	Taylor		Bell, L Hartley; McNaught	Attendance: 3,500; Referee: J Marshall

15 October 1892 Scottish League	Dumbarton	0–3	Celtic	Boghead Park
			Campbell; Davidson	Attendance: 3,500; Referee: Mr McNicol

22 October 1892 Scottish League	Dumbarton	5–1	Abercorn	Boghead Park
	Bell, J Bell, L McNaught; Hartley 89'		Cuthbertson

5 November 1892 Scottish League	Third Lanark	3–0	Dumbarton	Cathkin Park
	Mackay 50'; Boyd			Attendance: 1,500; Referee: S Mackay

19 November 1892 Scottish League	Leith Athletic	3–0	Dumbarton	Bank Park, Leith
	Henderson; Laing; Russell			Attendance: 4,000; Referee: J Marshall

18 February 1893 Scottish League	Clyde	1–2	Dumbarton	Barrowfield Park
	Goal		Bell, L 15'	Attendance: 2,000

4 March 1893 Scottish League	Dumbarton	1–1	Renton	Boghead Park
	Bell, L		McGregor	Referee: Mr McLaughlin

18 March 1893 Scottish League	Celtic	5–1	Dumbarton	Celtic Park
	Mulvey; Blessington; Davidson; Kelly		Johnstone 61'	Attendance: 8,000

1 April 1893 Scottish League	Dumbarton	5–1	Hearts	Boghead Park
	Fairbairn (o.g.); Bell, J Bell, L		McLaren	Attendance: 1,500; Referee: Mr Marshall

15 April 1893 Scottish League	Dumbarton	3–1	Clyde	Boghead Park
	Bell, L Keir; Taylor		Goal	Attendance: 1,500

22 April 1893 Scottish League	Dumbarton	3–0	Rangers	Boghead Park
	Johnstone 7'; Bell, L Taylor 62'			Referee: Mr McBain

29 April 1893 Scottish League	Abercorn	4–0	Dumbarton	Underwood Park, Paisley
	Miller; Boyd; Barr; McMillan (o.g.)			Referee: J Marshall

20 May 1893 Scottish League	Renton	0–4	Dumbarton	Tontine Park
			Campbell; Johnstone; Mair (o.g.)

=== Scottish Cup ===
17 December 1892 Cup R1	Clyde	1–6	Dumbarton	Barrowfield Park
	Cherrie		McNaught 5'; Bell, J 20'; Bell, L	Attendance: 1,500; Referee: Mr Clark

21 January 1893 Cup R2	Dumbarton	0–1	Rangers	Boghead Park
			McPherson	Attendance: 4,000; Referee: Mr Allison

=== Dumbartonshire Cup ===
28 January 1893 Semi-final	Dumbarton	1–1	Vale of Leven	Boghead Park
	Taylor }		Graham	Referee: J Marshall

4 February 1893 Semi-final Replay	Vale of Leven	2–6	Dumbarton	Millburn Park
	McFarlane } Graham }		Taylor 10'; Bell, J Bell, L	Attendance: 1,500; Referee: J Marshall

25 February 1893 Final	Dumbarton	7–1	Levendale	Tontine Park
	Bell, L McNaught; Taylor		Mills	Attendance: 2,000

=== Glasgow Charity Cup ===
13 May 1893 Semi-final	Celtic	0–0	Dumbarton	Cathkin Park
				Attendance: 6,000

17 May 1893 Semi-final Replay	Celtic	3–1	Dumbarton	Cathkin Park
	Kelly 10'; 68'		Bell, L 20'	Attendance: 6,000; Referee: Mr Robertson

=== Port Glasgow Athletic Benefit Tournament ===
27 June 1892 Semi-final	Port Glasgow Athletic	2–7	Dumbarton	Clune Park
	Goal		Taylor 10'

9 July 1892 Final	Rangers	4–1	Dumbarton	Ibrox Park
	McPherson 20'; Barker; McCreadie; Kerr		Keir	Attendance: 3,000; Referee: R Young

=== Friendlies ===
13 August 1892 Friendly	5th KRV	2–3	Dumbarton	Palmerston Park
	Elliott; Aitken		McDonald; Ferrier	Referee: F Farish

27 August 1892 Friendly	Ayr	1–1	Dumbarton	Somerset Park
	scrimmage 10'		3'

17 September 1892 Friendly	Renton	0–2	Dumbarton	Tontine Park
			Miller; Smith	Attendance: 3,000; Referee: T Oliver

29 October 1892 Friendly	Dumbarton	2–1	Renton	Boghead Park
	Hartley; Thomson, W		McGregor	Referee: J Marshall

26 November 1892 Friendly	Clyde	4–1	Dumbarton	Barrowfield Park
	McIntosh scrimmage Templeton		Taylor	Attendance: 500; Referee: Mr Hay

31 December 1892 Friendly	Kirkcaldy	1–5	Dumbarton	Newton Park, Kirkcaldy
	Anderson		Bell; Campbell; McNaught; Thomas (o.g.); Cairns (o.g.)	Referee: Mr Blewes

2 January 1893 Friendly	Dunfermline	0–5	Dumbarton	East End Park, Dunfermline
			Goal

3 January 1893 Friendly	Hearts	0–2	Dumbarton	Tynecastle Stadium
			Bell, J	Attendance: 7,000; Referee: Mr Riddell

11 February 1893 Friendly	(Northern Ireland) Linfield	4–2	Dumbarton	Ulsterville, Belfast
	Milne; Torrans; Smith (o.g.)		Saunderson; Gillan	Attendance: 3,500; Referee: W Potter

11 March 1893 Friendly	(England) Royal Arsenal	3–1	Dumbarton	Plumstead
	Shaw 35'; Elliot		Saunderson	Attendance: 6,000; Referee: Lt Simpson

25 March 1893 Friendly	Hibernian	3–2	Dumbarton	Easter Road
	Goal		Bell; Campbell	Attendance: 3,000

29 May 1893 Benefit	Dumbarton	1–0	Renton	Boghead Park
	Campbell

== Player statistics ==
As Dumbarton entered season 1892–93, the defending league champions for the second year running, while professionalism in England was widespread, clubs in Scotland could do little to detract their players from the offers being made by English agents.

Dumbarton were no exception and by the start of the season had already lost the services of John Miller to Liverpool, Dickie Boyle to Everton and James Galbraith to Middlesbrough.

However, during the season Dumbarton were further weakened by the loss of Abe Harley to Everton (January), James McNaught to Newton Heath (March), John Bell to Everton (April) and William Thomson to Aston Villa (April), not forgetting John Gillan, who had become a first team regular in November, also to Aston Villa (April). Nevertheless, the second XI continued to provide new local talent, and among those stepping up to the senior team were Lawrence Bell, Daniel Thomson, William Nash and Albert Saunderson.

No.	Pos	Nat	Player	Total		Scottish League		Scottish Cup	
No.	Pos	Nat	Player	Apps	Goals	Apps	Goals	Apps	Goals
	GK	(Scotland) SCO	John Barr	2	0	2	0	0	0
	GK	(Scotland) SCO	John McLeod	18	0	16	0	2	0
	DF	(Scotland) SCO	Tom McMillan	18	0	16	0	2	0
	DF	(Scotland) SCO	Alf Smith	19	0	17	0	2	0
	MF	(Scotland) SCO	Carrick	1	0	1	0	0	0
	MF	(Scotland) SCO	John Gillan	7	1	5	1	2	0
	MF	(Scotland) SCO	Leitch Keir	15	1	14	1	1	0
	MF	(Scotland) SCO	Alex McDonald	5	0	5	0	0	0
	MF	(Scotland) SCO	Alex Miller	10	0	9	0	1	0
	MF	(Scotland) SCO	Billy Nash	5	0	5	0	0	0
	MF	(Scotland) SCO	Nelson	1	0	1	0	0	0
	MF	(Scotland) SCO	J Orr	1	0	1	0	0	0
	MF	(Scotland) SCO	Daniel Thomson	9	0	9	0	0	0
	FW	(Scotland) SCO	Jack Bell	15	9	13	7	2	2
	FW	(Scotland) SCO	Lawrence Bell	13	11	11	9	2	2
	FW	(Scotland) SCO	William Campbell	4	1	4	1	0	0
	FW	(Scotland) SCO	Chisholm	1	0	1	0	0	0
	FW	(Scotland) SCO	Bob Ferrier	7	0	5	0	2	0
	FW	(Scotland) SCO	Abe Hartley	8	5	8	5	0	0
	FW	(Scotland) SCO	Robert Johnstone	6	4	6	4	0	0
	FW	(Scotland) SCO	Hugh Mair	2	1	2	1	0	0
	FW	(Scotland) SCO	James McNaught	13	3	11	1	2	2
	FW	(Scotland) SCO	Billy Robertson	2	0	2	0	0	0
	FW	(Scotland) SCO	Albert Saunderson	8	0	8	0	0	0
	FW	(Scotland) SCO	A Smith	3	0	3	0	0	0
	FW	(Scotland) SCO	John Taylor	14	3	12	3	2	0
	FW	(Scotland) SCO	William Thomson	11	1	9	1	2	0
	FW	(Scotland) SCO	Wilson	2	0	2	0	0	0

== Reserve Team ==
Dumbarton lost out to Clyde in the third round of the Scottish Second XI Cup but made it five wins on the trot by beating Dumbarton Union in the final of the Dumbartonshire Second XI Cup.
