= 1891–92 Scottish Cup =

Tournament details
- Country: Scotland
- Teams: 32

Final positions
- Champions: Celtic
- Runners-up: Queen's Park

The 1891–92 Scottish Cup was the 19th edition of Scotland's most prestigious football knockout competition.

Heart of Midlothian unsuccessfully defended its 1891 title in the Quarter-final on 6 February 1892 in neutral ground Hampden Park, Glasgow losing to Renton, 2–3.

The Celtic successful pursuit of its 1892 Cup on 12 March 1892 in Ibrox Park, Govan against Queen's Park, 1–0 with its 40,000 attendees was interrupted when the match declared void due to repeated crowd encroachment.

Celtic successfully sealed the pursuit of the 1892 Cup in the Final replay on 9 April 1892 in Ibrox Park, Govan defeating Queen's Park, 5–1. 30,000 attended.

The first qualifying process was begun in this Cup.

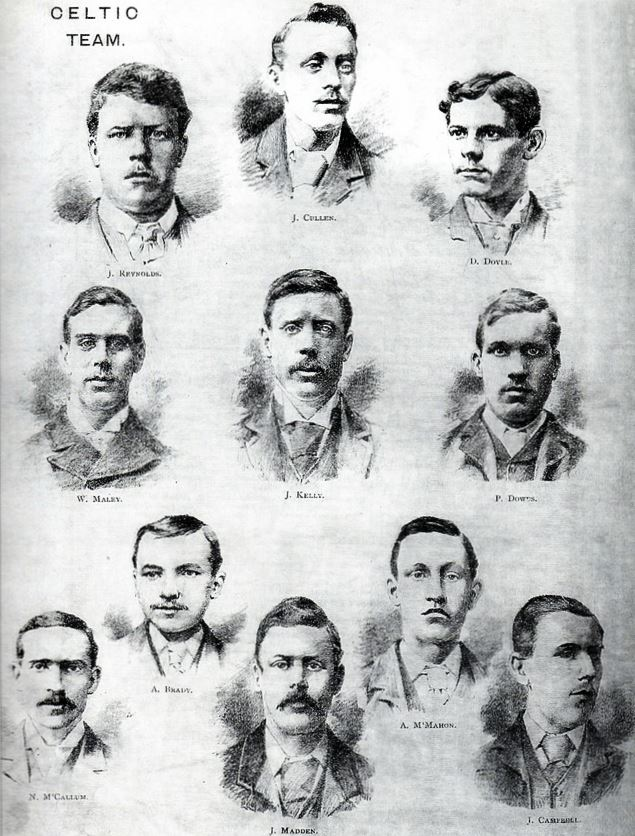
1892 Scottish Cup winners.

== Calendar ==
Round	First match date	Fixtures	Clubs
First round	28 November 1891	16	32 → 16
Second round	19 December 1891	8	16 → 8
Quarter-finals	23 January 1892	4	8 → 4
Semi-finals	6 February 1892	2	4 → 2
Final	12 March 1892	1	2 → 1

== Teams ==
Competing teams
Clubs exempt from preliminary rounds	Clubs qualified via preliminary rounds
Abercorn; Cambuslang; Celtic; Clyde; ~~Dundee Our Boys~~ (Note: Dundee Our Boys were voted to receive an exemption but requested to take part in the preliminary rounds. The request was granted and they were eliminated in the first preliminary round.); Dumbarton; Heart of Midlothian; Kilmarnock; Leith Athletic; Northern; Queen's Park; Rangers; Renton; St Mirren; Vale of Leven; 3rd Lanark RV	Aberdeen; Arbroath; Annbank; Ayr; Battlefield; Bathgate Rovers; Bridge of Allan; Broxburn Shamrock; Cowlairs; Dunblane; East Stirlingshire; Kilmarnock Athletic; Linthouse; Mid-Annandale; Monkcastle; St Bernard's; Thistle

== First round ==
First round results
Date	Home team	Score	Away team	Venue
28 November 1891	Dumbarton	4–0	Thistle	Boghead Park, Dumbarton
28 November 1891	East Stirlingshire	1–6	Kilmarnock	Merchiston Park, Bainsford
28 November 1891	St Mirren	2–4	Celtic	Westmarch, Paisley
28 November 1891	Broxburn Shamrock	7–2	Northern	Pyothall Road, Broxburn
28 November 1891	Leith Athletic	5–0	Dunblane	Beechwood Park, Edinburgh
28 November 1891	Heart of Midlothian	3–1 (abandoned) (Note: The Heart of Midlothian vs. Clyde match was abandoned after 85 minutes due to darkness and was subsequently replayed.)	Clyde	Tynecastle Park, Edinburgh
28 November 1891	Kilmarnock Athletic	7–2	Bridge of Allan	Holm Quarry, Kilmarnock
28 November 1891	Annbank	2–1	Battlefield	Pebble Park, Annbank
28 November 1891	Linthouse	0–6	Bathgate Rovers	Langlands Park, Govan
28 November 1891	Abercorn	2–3	Queen's Park	Underwood Park, Paisley
28 November 1891	3rd Lanark RV	3–0	Vale of Leven	Cathkin Park, Glasgow
28 November 1891	Rangers	5–1	St Bernard's	Ibrox Park, Govan
28 November 1891	Monkcastle	3–4	Arbroath	Forthbank Park, Stirling (Note: Match played at a neutral venue.)
28 November 1891	Renton	7–4	Ayr	Tontine Park, Renton
5 December 1891	Aberdeen	2–6	Mid-Annandale	Forthbank Park, Stirling
12 December 1891	Cowlairs	3–1	Cambuslang	Gourlay Park, Glasgow

First round replay
Date	Home team	Score	Away team	Venue
5 December 1891	Heart of Midlothian	8–0	Clyde	Tynecastle Park, Edinburgh

== Second round ==
Second round results
Date	Home team	Score	Away team	Venue
19 December 1891	3rd Lanark RV	1–3	Dumbarton	Cathkin Park, Glasgow
19 December 1891	Broxburn Shamrock	4–5	Heart of Midlothian	Pyothall Road, Broxburn
19 December 1891	Cowlairs	11–2	Mid-Annandale	Gourlay Park, Glasgow
19 December 1891	Annbank	2–1	Leith Athletic	Pebble Park, Annbank
19 December 1891	Queen's Park	6–0	Bathgate Rovers	Hampden Park, Glasgow
19 December 1891	Rangers	0–0	Kilmarnock	Ibrox Park, Govan
19 December 1891	Arbroath	0–3	Renton	Carolina Port, Dundee
19 December 1891	Celtic	3–0	Kilmarnock Athletic	Celtic Park, Glasgow

Second round replay
Date	Home team	Score	Away team	Venue
26 December 1891	Kilmarnock	1–1	Rangers	Rugby Park, Kilmarnock

Second round second replay
Date	Home team	Score	Away team	Venue
23 January 1892	Kilmarnock	2–3	Rangers	Westmarch, Paisley

== Quarter-final ==
Quarter-final results
Date	Home team	Score	Away team	Venue
23 January 1892	Celtic	4–1	Cowlairs	Celtic Park, Glasgow
23 January 1892	Renton	4–4	Heart of Midlothian	Tontine Park, Renton
23 January 1892	Dumbarton	2–2	Queen's Park	Boghead Park, Dumbarton
30 January 1892	Rangers	2–0	Annbank	Ibrox Park, Govan

Quarter-final replays
Date	Home team	Score	Away team	Venue
30 January 1892	Heart of Midlothian	2–2	Renton	Tynecastle Park, Edinburgh
30 January 1892	Queen's Park	4–1	Dumbarton	Hampden Park, Glasgow

Quarter-final second replay
Date	Home team	Score	Away team	Venue
6 February 1892	Heart of Midlothian	2–3	Renton	Hampden Park, Glasgow

== Semi-finals ==
Semi-final results
Date	Home team	Score	Away team	Venue
6 February 1892	Celtic	5–3	Rangers	Celtic Park, Glasgow
13 February 1892	Renton	1–1	Queen's Park	Tontine Park, Renton

Semi-final replay
Date	Home team	Score	Away team	Venue
27 February 1892	Queen's Park	3–0	Renton	Hampden Park, Glasgow

== Final ==
12 March 1892

Celtic	1–0	Queen's Park
Campbell 60'

Ibrox Park, Govan
Attendance: 40,000
Referee: G. Sneddon

Match declared void due to repeated crowd encroachment.

=== Final replay ===
9 April 1892

Celtic	5–1	Queen's Park
McMahon 90'; Campbell; Kelly		Waddell 20'

Ibrox Park, Govan
Attendance: 30,000
Referee: G. Sneddon

=== Teams ===
Celtic:
GK	Joseph Cullen
RB	Jerry Reynolds
LB	Dan Doyle
RH	Willie Maley
CH	James Kelly
LH	Peter Dowds
OR	Neil McCallum
IR	Alex Brady
CF	Jake Madden
IL	Sandy McMahon
OL	John Campbell
Replay:	Paddy Gallacher replaced Madden and moved to midfield, with Dowds moving up front. (Note: The FitbaStats website states that Madden played in the second match and Matthew Flannagan played instead of Dowds, but other reports contradict this (and Flannagan did not join the club until the following month).)

Queen's Park:
GK	Andrew Baird
RB	Donald Sillars
LB	Bob Smellie
RH	John Gillespie
CH	Tom Robertson
LH	David Stewart
OR	William Gulliland
IR	Tom Waddell
CF	James Hamilton
IL	William Lambie
OL	William Sellar
Replay:	John Lambie (Note: There is uncertainty over the identity of the 11th player for Queen's Park. The Scotsman asserts it was Scottish international John Lambie who came into the team, although he was living in England and not registered with the club at the time. The Glasgow Herald report states that 'Gillespie' came into the side, but John Gillespie was already in the line-up in place of the injured Walter Arnott. The Queen's Park archive website has a second 'J Gillespie' in the match report, but has a "Scott, H." in its players list making his only appearance for the club. The Herald report also mentions "Scott" in quote marks, indicating the likelihood of the name being a pseudonym, and the Scottish Referee confirms this was "an old and favourite player" without naming him.) replaced Smellie and moved to the attack, with Sellar moving to the defence.

== See also ==
- 1891–92 in Scottish football
