= 1892–93 Celtic F.C. season =

Celtic
1892–93 season
- Stadium: Celtic Park
- Scottish First Division: 1st
- Scottish Cup: Finalists

1892–93 was the fifth season of Scottish football for Celtic, who competed in the Scottish Football League.

Celtic won the league for the first time by just one point. It was the club's second major domestic honour, as they had won the Scottish Cup the previous season. They failed to retain that trophy, though, as they lost the final replay 2-1 against Queen's Park. Celtic won the originally scheduled final 1-0, but although the match was voided upon pre-match inspection, it was played nonetheless so as to not upset the 30,000 crowd gathered at Ibrox Park, with the decision announced to spectators in the second half.

== Pre-season and friendlies ==
16 July 1892 League	Celtic	1–1	Clyde	Celtic Park
15:00 GMT		Celtic Report

6 August 1892 League	Dundee Harp	2–5	Celtic	Athletic Ground
15:00 GMT		Celtic Report

1 September 1982 Friendly	Celtic	0–1	Sheffield United	Celtic Park
15:00 GMT		Celtic Report

2 September 1982 Friendly	Middlesbrough	0–2	Celtic	Linthorpe Road
15:00 GMT		Celtic Report

3 September 1982 Friendly	Newcastle East End	0–1	Celtic	St James' Park
15:00 GMT		Celtic Report

5 September 1982 Friendly	Sunderland	1–0	Celtic	Newcastle Road
15:00 GMT		Celtic Report

6 October 1892 Friendly	Celtic	0–3	Sunderland	Celtic Park
15:00 GMT		Celtic Report

8 October 1892 Friendly	Celtic	2–1	Third Lanark	Celtic Park
15:00 GMT		Celtic Report

7 November 1892 Friendly	Stoke City	5–0	Celtic	Victoria Ground
15:00 GMT		Celtic Report

24 December 1892 Friendly	Celtic	3–2	Third Lanark	Celtic Park
15:00 GMT		Celtic Report

26 December 1892 Friendly	Ardwick	0–5	Celtic	Hyde Road
15:00 GMT		Celtic Report

31 December 1892 Friendly	Celtic	6–0	Third Lanark	Celtic Park
15:00 GMT		Celtic Report

2 January 1893 Friendly	Celtic	2–2	Hearts	Celtic Park
15:00 GMT		Celtic Report

3 January 1893 Friendly	Celtic	1–1	Notts County	Celtic Park
15:00 GMT		Celtic Report

27 March 1893 Friendly	Celtic	2–1	All Ireland XI	Celtic Park
15:00 GMT		Celtic Report

1 April 1893 Friendly	Celtic	3–0	London Caledonians	Celtic Park
15:00 GMT		Celtic Report

1 April 1893 Friendly	Celtic	1–3	Rangers	Ibrox Stadium
15:00 GMT		Celtic Report

8 April 1893 Friendly	Kilmarnock	1–2	Celtic	Ibrox Stadium
15:00 GMT		Celtic Report

15 April 1893 Friendly	Celtic	2–2	Blackburn Rovers	Celtic Park
15:00 GMT		Celtic Report

17 April 1893 Friendly	Hearts	1–3	Celtic	Tynecastle Park
15:00 GMT		Celtic Report

18 April 1893 Friendly	Everton	2–1	Celtic	Goodison Park
15:00 GMT		Celtic Report

18 April 1893 Friendly	Celtic	2–0	Everton	Celtic Park
15:00 GMT		Celtic Report

10 May 1893 Friendly	Airdrieonians	3–4	Celtic	Broomfield Park
15:00 GMT		Celtic Report

23 May 1893 Friendly	Celtic	1–5	Queen's Park	Celtic Park
15:00 GMT		Celtic Report

29 May 1893 Friendly	King's Park	1–1	Celtic	Forthbank Park
15:00 GMT		Celtic Report

== Competitions ==
=== Scottish Football League ===
==== League table ====
Pos	Team	Pld	W	D	L	GF	GA	GD	Pts	Qualification or relegation
1	Celtic (C)	18	14	1	3	54	25	+29	29	Champions
2	Rangers	18	12	4	2	41	27	+14	28	
3	St Mirren	18	9	2	7	40	39	+1	20	
4	Third Lanark	18	9	1	8	53	39	+14	19	
5	Heart of Midlothian	18	8	2	8	39	41	−2	18	

Source: statto.com
Rules for classification: Teams finish equal if level on points. Points system: 2 points for a win, 1 point for a draw, 0 points for a loss
(C) Champions

==== Matches ====
20 August 1892 Football League	Celtic	4–3	Renton	Glasgow
				Stadium: Celtic Park; Attendance: 15,000

27 August 1892 Football League	Hearts	3–1	Celtic	Edinburgh
				Stadium: Tynecastle Park; Attendance: 8,000

10 September 1892 Football League	Celtic	3–2	Abercorn	Glasgow
				Stadium: Celtic Park; Attendance: 6,000

24 September 1892 Football League	Rangers	2–2	Celtic	Glasgow
				Stadium: Ibrox Park; Attendance: 14,000

1 October 1892 Football League	Celtic	3–1	Clyde	Glasgow
				Stadium: Celtic Park; Attendance: 8,000

15 October 1892 Football League	Dumbarton	0–3	Celtic	Dumbarton
				Stadium: Boghead Park; Attendance: 6,000

22 October 1892 Football League	St Mirren	1–3	Celtic	Paisley
				Stadium: Westmarch; Attendance: 8,000

5 November 1892 Football League	Celtic	5–0	Heart of Midlothian	Glasgow
				Stadium: Celtic Park; Attendance: 8,000

28 January 1893 Football League	Leith Athletic	0–1	Celtic	Leith
				Stadium: Bank Park; Attendance: 2,500

11 February 1893 Football League	Abercorn	4–2	Celtic	Abercorn
				Stadium: Underwood Park; Attendance: 4,000

18 March 1893 Football League	Celtic	5–1	Dumbarton	Glasgow
				Stadium: Celtic Park; Attendance: 8,000

25 March 1893 Football League	Renton	0–2	Celtic	Renton
				Stadium: Tontine Park; Attendance: 4,000

22 April 1893 Football League	Third Lanark	0–6	Celtic	Glasgow
				Stadium: Cathkin Park; Attendance: 10,000

29 April 1893 Football League	Celtic	3–0	Rangers	Glasgow
				Stadium: Celtic Park; Attendance: 14,000

2 May 1893 Football League	Celtic	4–1	St Mirren	Glasgow
				Stadium: Celtic Park; Attendance: 8,000

6 May 1893 Football League	Clyde	1–2	Celtic	Glasgow
				Stadium: Barrowfield Park; Attendance: 6,000

9 May 1893 Football League	Celtic	3–1	Leith Athletic	Glasgow
				Stadium: Celtic Park; Attendance: 10,000

9 May 1893 Football League	Celtic	2–5	Third Lanark	Glasgow
				Stadium: Celtic Park; Attendance: 3,000

=== Scottish Cup ===
26 November 1892 First round	Celtic	3–1	Linthouse	Glasgow
				Stadium: Celtic Park

17 December 1892 Second round	Celtic	7–0	5th Kirkcudbrightshire Rifle Volunteers	Glasgow
				Stadium: Celtic Park

21 January 1893 Third round	Celtic	5–1	Third Lanark	Glasgow
				Stadium: Celtic Park; Attendance: 8,000

4 February 1893 Semi-final	Celtic	5–0	St Bernard's	Glasgow
				Stadium: Celtic Park; Attendance: 11,500

25 February 1893 Final	Queen's Park	0–1	Celtic	Glasgow
				Stadium: Ibrox Park; Attendance: 13,329

11 March 1893 Final Replay	Queen's Park	2–1	Celtic	Glasgow
				Stadium: Ibrox Park; Attendance: 13,329

=== Glasgow Cup ===
16 September 1892 Glasgow Cup	Pollokshaws	2–7	Celtic	Glasgow
15:00 GMT		Celtic Report		Stadium: Maxwell Park; Attendance: 4,000

12 November 1892 Glasgow Cup	Partick Thistle	1–1	Celtic	Glasgow
15:00 GMT		Celtic Report		Stadium: Inchview Park; Attendance: 200

19 November 1892 Glasgow Cup	Celtic	8–0	Partick Thistle	Glasgow
15:00 GMT		Celtic Report		Stadium: Celtic Park; Attendance: 4,000

7 January 1893 Glasgow Cup	Celtic	5–2	Third Lanark	Glasgow
15:00 GMT		Celtic Report		Stadium: Celtic Park; Attendance: 26,000

18 February 1893 Glasgow Cup	Celtic	1–3	Rangers	Glasgow
15:00 GMT		Celtic Report		Stadium: Cathkin Park

=== Glasgow Merchants Charity Cup ===
13 May 1893 Glasgow Merchants Charity Cup	Celtic	0–0	Dumbarton	Glasgow
15:00 GMT		Celtic Report		Stadium: Celtic Park

17 May 1893 Glasgow Merchants Charity Cup	Dumbarton	0–1	Celtic	Glasgow
15:00 GMT		Celtic Report		Stadium: Cathkin Park

27 May 1893 Glasgow Merchants Charity Cup	Celtic	5–0	Rangers	Glasgow
15:00 GMT		Celtic Report		Stadium: Celtic Park
