= 1893–94 Dumbarton F.C. season =

Dumbarton
1893–94 season
- Stadium: Boghead Park, Dumbarton
- Scottish League Division One: 5th
- Scottish Cup: Second Round
- Top goalscorer: League: Robert Johnstone (11); All: Robert Johnstone (11)
Home colours

The 1893–94 season was the 21st Scottish football season in which Dumbarton competed at national level, entering the Scottish Football League and the Scottish Cup. In addition Dumbarton played in the Dumbartonshire Cup.

== Scottish League ==
The demand for league football nationally resulted in the creation of a new second division. Meanwhile, Dumbarton competed in their first season as a professional outfit. From now on it would be a 'big ask' for the club to compete with the larger outfits as they could not generate the required funds to attract the best talent. Nevertheless, a creditable 5th place in the First Division was achieved with 19 points, 10 behind champions Celtic.

26 August 1893 Scottish League	Celtic	0–0	Dumbarton	Celtic Park
				Attendance: 10,000; Referee: A McKenzie

2 September 1893 Scottish League	Dumbarton	1–5	St Bernard's	Boghead Park
	Ferrier		Oswald 75'; McNab; Crossan 86'	Referee: J Marshall

9 September 1893 Scottish League	Third Lanark	1–3	Dumbarton	Cathkin Park
	McInnes 35'		Johnstone (o.g.); McLeod, D 88'	Attendance: 4,000

16 September 1893 Scottish League	Dumbarton	1–1	Dundee	Boghead Park
	Taylor 59'		Dundas 49'	Attendance: 2,000; Referee: Mr McLaughlin

23 September 1893 Scottish League	Rangers	4–0	Dumbarton	Ibrox Park
	McCreadie; Marshall; Smith (o.g.); Steel			Attendance: 4,000

30 September 1893 Scottish League	Dumbarton	2–2	Hearts	Boghead Park
	Taylor; Johnstone		Russell; Chambers	Attendance: 1,000; Referee: Mr Cameron

7 October 1893 Scottish League	Renton	1–1	Dumbarton	Tontine Park
	scrimmage 65'		Johnstone 30'

21 October 1893 Scottish League	Dumbarton	3–3	St Mirren	Boghead Park
	Mirk (o.g.); Hendry; Saunderson 89'		Bell; McLean 45'	Referee: Mr Richardson

28 October 1893 Scottish League	Leith Athletic	2–4	Dumbarton	Beechwood Park (Leith)
	Lee; Henderson		Ferrier; Campbell (o.g.)	Attendance: 2,000; Referee: J Marshall

4 November 1893 Scottish League	St Bernard's	2–1	Dumbarton	New Logie Green
	Laing; Crossan		Johnstone

11 November 1893 Scottish League	St Mirren	1–2	Dumbarton	Westmarch (stadium)
	McLean		Johnstone; Taylor 90'	Referee: J Marshall

18 November 1893 Scottish League	Dumbarton	2–0	Renton	Boghead Park
	Johnstone 20'; Ferrier

9 December 1893 Scottish League	Dundee	4–0	Dumbarton	West Craigie Park
	Thomson 25'; Dundas; Keiler			Attendance: 2,500; Referee: Mr Allison

23 December 1893 Scottish League	Dumbarton	4–5	Celtic	Boghead Park
	Johnstone; Bell, L		Cassidy; McMahon; Blessington; McMillan (o.g.)	Attendance: 6,000

20 January 1894 Scottish League	Dumbarton	2–0	Rangers	Boghead Park
	Saunderson; Bell, L			Referee: Mr Allison

3 February 1894 Scottish League	Dumbarton	3–1	Leith Athletic	Boghead Park
	Ferrier 15'; Taylor; Johnstone		McFarlane 20'	Referee: J Marshall

17 March 1894 Scottish League	Dumbarton	2–1	Third Lanark	Boghead Park
	Ferrier; Bell, L		Stewart 15'	Referee: J Baillie

28 April 1894 Scottish League	Hearts	2–1	Dumbarton	Tynecastle Stadium
	Taylor		Johnstone 15'	Attendance: 4,000; Referee: Mr McLaughlin

== Scottish Cup ==
After a first round win over local rivals Vale of Leven, Dumbarton were defeated in the second round by St Bernards.

25 November 1893 Cup R1	Vale of Leven	1–2	Dumbarton	Millburn Park
	McColl 65'		Bell, L 25'; Saunderson 80'

16 December 1893 Cup R2	Dumbarton	1–3	St Bernard's	Boghead Park
	Taylor		Scott 10'; Wilson	Referee: W Hay

== Dumbartonshire Cup ==
Dumbarton retained the Dumbartonshire Cup, defeating Duntocher Harp in the final.

30 December 1893 Semi Final	Vale of Leven	1–3	Dumbarton	Boghead Park
	Gallacher 86'		Taylor 35'; Wilson 38' (o.g.); Saunderson 49'	Referee: Mr Allison

21 April 1894 Final	Dumbarton	4–1	Duntocher Harp	Castle Grounds, Dalmuir
	Campbell; Bell, L (o.g.)		Goal	Attendance: 1,000; Referee: A McLean

== Friendlies ==
During the season 17 'friendly' matches were played, including a 'mini' north of England tour during the New Year holidays. In all, 6 were won, 5 drawn and 6 lost, scoring 41 goals and conceding 39.

5 August 1893 Friendly	5th KRV	2–4	Dumbarton	Palmerston Park
	Henderson; Morley		McCalley (o.g.); Bell; Campbell	Attendance: 1,000; Referee: W Cairns

12 August 1893 Friendly	Ayr	2–3	Dumbarton	Somerset Park
	Kelly		scrimmage 80'	Referee: Mr Craig

19 August 1893 Friendly	King's Park	5–2	Dumbarton	Forthbank Park
	Gray; Angus; Wilson; McInnes		Taylor; Johnstone	Referee: C Don

19 October 1893 Friendly	Dundee Harp	3–2	Dumbarton	East Dock Street
	Brady; Brannan		Taylor	Referee: Mr Campbell

1 January 1894 Friendly	(England) Blackburn Rovers	4–2	Dumbarton	Ewood Park
	Whitehead; Hall; Southworth 80'		Johnstone; Bell	Attendance: 3,000

1 January 1894 Friendly	(England) Darwen	2–1	Dumbarton	Darwen
	Orr; Maxwell		Bell	Attendance: 3,000

13 January 1894 Friendly	Wishaw Thistle	4–4	Dumbarton	Recreation Park, Wishaw
	King; Brownlie; Watt		Bell; Taylor	Attendance: 1,000; Referee: Mr McLeod

10 February 1894 Friendly	Motherwell	2–3	Dumbarton	Dalziel Park (stadium)
	Allan 1'; Lightbody 25'		Johnstone; Andrews	Referee: Mr Allison

24 February 1894 Friendly	Queen's Park	3–3	Dumbarton	Hampden Park
	Muir; Waddell; Lambie		Johnstone; Andrews 85'	Attendance: 1,500; Referee: Mr Harrison

3 March 1894 Friendly	Morton	2–2	Dumbarton	Cappielow Park
	scrimmage McIntyre 75'		Campbell 46'; Seaton 51'

10 March 1894 Friendly	Dumbarton	5–0	Battlefield	Boghead Park
	Saunderson; Taylor; Andrews

24 March 1894 Friendly	Renton	1–2	Dumbarton	Tontine Park
	Bell 20'		Campbell 12'; Boyle 80'

31 March 1894 Friendly	Leith Athletic	4–1	Dumbarton	Beechwood Park (Leith)
	Walker; Scott		Bell

14 April 1894 Friendly	St Bernard's	1–1	Dumbarton	New Logie Green
	Crossan		Campbell	Attendance: 2,000

12 May 1894 Friendly	E Stirling	2–1	Dumbarton	Merchiston Park
	McDonald; Steel		Boyle	Attendance: 2,000

19 May 1894 Friendly	Partick Thistle	0–3	Dumbarton	Meadowside
			Ferrier 10'; Sanderson; Campbell 60'	Attendance: 1,000; Referee: Mr Drummond

26 May 1894 Friendly	Third Lanark	2–2	Dumbarton	Cathkin Park (1872–1903)
	Goal		Ferrier	Attendance: 1,000

== Player statistics ==
Despite the switch to professionalism, Dumbarton struggled to hold on to their 'star' players and during the season lost, amongst others, internationalist John Taylor who moved to St Mirren.

No.	Pos	Nat	Player	Total		First Division		Scottish Cup	
No.	Pos	Nat	Player	Apps	Goals	Apps	Goals	Apps	Goals
	GK	(Scotland) SCO	John Barr	4	0	3	0	1	0
	GK	(Scotland) SCO	John McLeod	16	0	15	0	1	0
	DF	(Scotland) SCO	James McGregor	3	0	3	0	0	0
	DF	(Scotland) SCO	Tom McMillan	17	0	15	0	2	0
	DF	(Scotland) SCO	Alf Smith	19	0	17	0	2	0
	MF	(Scotland) SCO	Alex Lang	2	0	2	0	0	0
	MF	(Scotland) SCO	Alex Miller	14	0	12	0	2	0
	MF	(Scotland) SCO	Billy Nash	13	0	12	0	1	0
	MF	(Scotland) SCO	Albert Saunderson	15	3	13	2	2	1
	MF	(Scotland) SCO	Daniel Thomson	19	0	17	0	2	0
	MF	(Scotland) SCO	Wilson	1	0	1	0	0	0
	FW	(Scotland) SCO	Billy Andrews	12	0	10	0	2	0
	FW	(Scotland) SCO	Lawrence Bell	20	4	18	3	2	1
	FW	(Scotland) SCO	William Campbell	11	1	11	1	0	0
	FW	(Scotland) SCO	Bob Ferrier	17	6	15	6	2	0
	FW	(Scotland) SCO	Robert Hendry	2	1	2	1	0	0
	FW	(Scotland) SCO	Robert Johnstone	17	11	15	11	2	0
	FW	(Scotland) SCO	David McLeod	5	1	5	1	0	0
	FW	(Scotland) SCO	John Taylor	14	5	13	4	1	1

=== International caps ===
John Taylor earned his third and fourth 'League' caps in Scottish League XI's against the Irish and English Leagues respectively - scoring a goal in the 6–2 win over the Irish.

Tom McMillan also earned his first 'League' cap in the match against the Irish League.

== Reserve team ==
Dumbarton were defeated in the second round of the Scottish Second XI Cup by Celtic.
