= Dave Ellis (footballer) =

Scottish footballer

Personal information
- Full name: David Thomson Ellis
- Date of birth: 10 April 1869
- Place of birth: West Calder, Scotland
- Date of death: 29 January 1940 (aged 70)
- Place of death: Edinburgh, Scotland
- Position: Centre-forward

Senior career*
Years	Team	Apps	(Gls)
–1892	Mossend Swifts		
1892–1893	Heart of Midlothian	14	(2)

International career
1892	Scotland	1	(1)
- * Club domestic league appearances and goals

David Thomson Ellis (10 April 1869 – 29 January 1940) was a Scottish footballer who played as a centre-forward and made one appearance for the Scotland national team.

== Club career ==
Ellis played for Mossend Swifts in the early 1890s, but also featured in a friendly match for Heart of Midlothian on 1 March 1890. He joined Heart of Midlothian in the second half of the 1891–92 season, where he played until the end of the following season, making fourteen appearances and scoring two goals for the club in the Scottish Football League. Ellis also featured for Celtic as a guest player in a friendly against Nottingham Forest on 4 April 1892.

== International career ==
Ellis earned his first and only cap for Scotland on 19 March 1892 in the 1891–92 British Home Championship against Ireland in Belfast. He scored Scotland's third goal of the match in the 70th minute, extending their lead to 3–1, with the match ultimately finishing as a 3–2 win.

== Personal life ==
Ellis was born on 10 April 1869 in West Calder. His brother James was also a footballer, and played alongside David at Mossend Swifts. As a result, some sources erroneously attributed the national team cap against Ireland to James. Ellis was married to Elizabeth Kennady, and died on 29 January 1940 in Edinburgh at the age of 70.

== Career statistics ==
=== Club ===
Club	Season	League			Cup (Note: Includes Scottish Cup)		Other		Total		Ref.
Club	Season	Division	Apps	Goals	Apps	Goals	Apps	Goals	Apps	Goals	Ref.
Heart of Midlothian	1891–92	Scottish Football League	3	2	0	0	0	0	3	2	
Heart of Midlothian	1892–93	Scottish Football League	11	0	5	3	3 (Note: Appearances in the East of Scotland Shield)	6	19	9	
Heart of Midlothian	Totals		14	2	5	3	3	6	22	11	—

=== International ===
Scotland
Year	Apps	Goals
1892	1	1
Total	1	1

=== International goals ===
No.	Date	Venue	Opponent	Score	Result	Competition
1	19 March 1892	Solitude, Belfast, Ireland	Ireland	3–1	3–2	1891–92 British Home Championship
