= 1892–93 Scottish Cup =

Tournament details
- Country: Scotland
- Teams: 32

Final positions
- Champions: Queen's Park
- Runners-up: Celtic

The 1892–93 Scottish Cup was the 20th season of Scotland's most prestigious football knockout competition. The Cup was won by Queen's Park when they beat Celtic 2–1 in the final after a replay.

== Calendar ==
Round	First match date	Fixtures	Clubs
First round	26 November 1892	16	32 → 16
Second round	17 December 1892	8	16 → 8
Quarter-finals	21 January 1893	4	8 → 4
Semi-finals	4 February 1893	2	4 → 2
Final	25 February 1893	1	2 → 1

== Teams ==
Competing teams
Clubs exempt from preliminary rounds	Clubs qualified via preliminary rounds
Abercorn; Cambuslang; Celtic; Clyde; Dumbarton; Heart of Midlothian; Kilmarnock; Leith Athletic; Linthouse; Northern; Queen's Park; Rangers; Renton; St Bernard's; St Mirren; 3rd Lanark RV	Aberdeen; Airdrieonians; Albion Rovers; Annbank; Broxburn Shamrock; Camelon; Campsie; Cowlairs; Dunblane; King's Park; Monkcastle; Motherwell; Queen of the South Wanderers; Royal Albert; Stenhousemuir; 5th Kirkcudbright RV

== First round ==
First round results
Date	Home team	Score	Away team	Venue
26 November 1892	Celtic	3–1	Linthouse	Celtic Park, Glasgow
26 November 1892	Airdrieonians	3–6	3rd Lanark RV	Broomfield Park, Airdrie
26 November 1892	Motherwell	9–2 (protested) (Note: A protest by Campsie was upheld and a replay was ordered.)	Campsie	Dalziel Park, Motherwell
26 November 1892	Aberdeen	4–6	St Mirren	Chanonry Grounds, Aberdeen
26 November 1892	Dunblane	0–3	Broxburn Shamrock	Duckburn Park, Dunblane
26 November 1892	Stenhousemuir	1–1	Heart of Midlothian	Ochilview Park, Stenhousemuir
26 November 1892	Northern	1–3	Leith Athletic	Hyde Park, Glasgow
26 November 1892	Royal Albert	6–1	Cambuslang	Raploch Park, Larkhall
26 November 1892	Abercorn	6–0	Renton	Underwood Park, Paisley
26 November 1892	Albion Rovers	1–2	Kilmarnock	Meadow Park, Coatbridge
26 November 1892	St Bernard's	5–1	Queen of the South Wanderers	New Logie Green, Edinburgh
26 November 1892	Rangers	7–0	Annbank	Ibrox Park, Govan
26 November 1892	King's Park	6–1	Monkcastle	Forthbank Park, Stirling
26 November 1892	5th Kirkcudbright RV	5–3	Camelon	Palmerston Park, Dumfries
17 December 1892	Clyde	1–6 (Note: Match abandoned after 65 minutes due to crowd trouble. The result was allowed to stand.)	Dumbarton	Barrowfield Park, Glasgow
21 January 1893	Cowlairs	1–4	Queen's Park	Gourlay Park, Glasgow

First round replays
Date	Home team	Score	Away team	Venue
17 December 1892	Motherwell	6–4	Campsie	Dalziel Park, Motherwell
17 December 1892	Heart of Midlothian	8–0	Stenhousemuir	Tynecastle Park, Edinburgh

== Second round ==
Second round results
Date	Home team	Score	Away team	Venue
17 December 1892	Leith Athletic	0–2	St Mirren	Beechwood Park, Edinburgh
17 December 1892	Celtic	7–0	5th Kirkcudbright RV	Celtic Park, Glasgow
17 December 1892	Royal Albert	1–1	St Bernard's	Raploch Park, Larkhall
17 December 1892	Abercorn	4–5	3rd Lanark RV	Underwood Park, Paisley
17 December 1892	Broxburn Shamrock	3–0	King's Park	Shamrock Park, Broxburn
24 December 1892	Motherwell	2–4	Heart of Midlothian	Dalziel Park, Motherwell
21 January 1893	Dumbarton	0–1	Rangers	Boghead Park, Dumbarton
28 January 1893	Kilmarnock	0–8	Queen's Park	Rugby Park, Kilmarnock

Second round replay
Date	Home team	Score	Away team	Venue
24 December 1892	St Bernard's	5–2	Royal Albert	New Logie Green, Edinburgh

== Quarter-final ==
Quarter-final results
Date	Home team	Score	Away team	Venue
21 January 1893	Broxburn Shamrock	4–3	St Mirren	Shamrock Park, Broxburn
21 January 1893	Celtic	5–1	3rd Lanark RV	Celtic Park, Glasgow
28 January 1893	St Bernard's	3–2	Rangers	New Logie Green, Edinburgh
4 February 1893	Heart of Midlothian	1–1	Queen's Park	Tynecastle Park, Edinburgh

Quarter-final replay
Date	Home team	Score	Away team	Venue
11 February 1893	Queen's Park	5–2	Heart of Midlothian	Hampden Park, Glasgow

== Semi-finals ==
Semi-final results
Date	Home team	Score	Away team	Venue
4 February 1893	Celtic	5–0	St Bernard's	Celtic Park, Glasgow
18 February 1893	Queen's Park	4–2	Broxburn Shamrock	Hampden Park, Glasgow

== Final ==
25 February 1893

Celtic	1 – 0	Queen's Park
Towie

Ibrox Park, Govan
Attendance: 30,000
Referee: R. F. Harrison

Match declared void due to frozen pitch (decided pre-match after inspection, but not announced to spectators until the second half).

=== Final replay ===
11 March 1893

Queen's Park	2 – 1	Celtic
Sellar		Blessington

Ibrox Park, Govan
Attendance: 15,000
Referee: R. F. Harrison

The winning goal was believed by some observers not to have fully entered the goal before being cleared, and Celtic protested but the score stood. Although their use would not have resolved that particular incident, this controversy and debate led to goal nets being introduced in the latter stages of the Scottish Cup from then on.

=== Teams ===
Celtic:
GK	Joseph Cullen
RB	Jerry Reynolds
LB	Dan Doyle
RH	Willie Maley
CH	James Kelly
LH	Tom Dunbar
OR	James Blessington
IR	Thomas Towie
CF	Jake Madden
IL	Sandy McMahon
OL	John Campbell
Replay:	Unchanged. (Note: The FitbaStats website states that Michael Dunbar (brother of Tom) played in the first match, but other reports contradict this.)

Queen's Park:
GK	Andrew Baird
RB	Donald Sillars
LB	Bob Smellie
RH	John Gillespie
CH	Tom Robertson
LH	David Stewart
OR	William Gulliland
IR	Tom Waddell
CF	James Hamilton
IL	William Sellar
OL	William Lambie
Replay:	Robert McFarlane replaced Robertson.
