= William Lambie (footballer) =

Scottish footballer

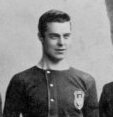
- Lambie in Scotland kit, 1895

Personal information
- Full name: William Allan Lambie
- Date of birth: 10 January 1873
- Place of birth: Crosshill, Scotland
- Date of death: 16 June 1936 (aged 63)
- Place of death: Pollokshields, Scotland
- Position: Outside left

Senior career*
Years	Team	Apps	(Gls)
- Queen's Park
1892	Ardwick	3	(0)
- Queen's Park

International career
1892–1897	Scotland	9	(5)
- * Club domestic league appearances and goals

William Allan Lambie (10 January 1873 – 16 June 1936) was a Scottish footballer of the 1880s and 1890s.

== Career ==
Born in southern Glasgow and privately educated at the High School of Glasgow, Lambie played mainly at outside left for Queen's Park; he joined the club alongside school friends William Gulliland and Tom Waddell, and together they claimed Scottish Cup runners-up medals in 1892 and winner's medals in 1893 – the club's last triumph in the competition. Aside from a brief spell at Ardwick (Manchester City) in 1892 and one guest appearance for Corinthian, Lambie remained at Queen's Park until around 1900, also claiming winner's medals from the minor Glasgow Merchants Charity Cup (1891, his breakthrough with four goals in the final) and Glasgow League (1897); again, these were the last occasions the Spiders lifted the trophies.

He was capped nine times by the Scotland national team, making his debut against Ireland in 1892 at the age of 19. He scored five goals, including once in each of his first four appearances, and had a role in three British Home Championship wins (1893–94, 1895–96 and 1896–97).

In the 1901–02 season, a man purporting to be Lambie was engaged by Burnley without having been seen playing. In the first few minutes of his first match it became clear that it was an imposter; he was taken off the field during the game and was promptly fired.

== Personal life ==
His older brother John was also a Queen's Park regular and an international, and holds the records for being the youngest Scotland player and captain of all time. A third brother, Robert, also featured for Queen's Park; the three siblings' careers barely overlapped in terms of playing together.

== International goals ==
Scores and results list Scotland's goal tally first.

#	Date	Venue	Opponent	Score	Result	Competition
1	19 March 1892	Solitude Ground, Belfast	Ireland	2–1	3–2	BHC
2	18 March 1893	The Racecourse, Wrexham	Wales	7–0	8–0	BHC
3	7 April 1894	Celtic Park, Glasgow	England	1–0	2–2	BHC
4	30 March 1895	Celtic Park, Glasgow	Ireland	1–0	3–1	BHC
5	4 April 1896	Celtic Park, Glasgow	England	1–0	2–1	BHC

== See also ==
- List of Scotland national football team captains
- List of Scottish football families
