= 1895–96 Celtic F.C. season =

Celtic
1895–96 season
- Stadium: Celtic Park
- Scottish First Division: 1st
- Scottish Cup: First round

1895–96 was the eighth football season played by Celtic. They competed in the Scottish First Division, which they won for the third time in four seasons. It was the fourth major domestic honour won by the club. They also successfully defended the Glasgow Cup and won the Glasgow Charity Cup for the fifth time in a row.

== Competitions ==
=== Scottish First Division ===
==== League table ====
Pos	Team	Pld	W	D	L	GF	GA	GD	Pts	Qualification or relegation
1	Celtic (C)	18	15	0	3	64	25	+39	30	Champions
2	Rangers	18	11	4	3	57	39	+18	26	
3	Hibernian	18	11	2	5	58	39	+19	24	
4	Heart of Midlothian	18	11	0	7	68	36	+32	22	
5	Dundee	18	7	2	9	33	42	−9	16	

Source: "1895-1896 Division 1 - SPFL Archive". SPFL.
Rules for classification: Teams finish equal if level on points. Points system: 2 points for a win, 1 point for a draw, 0 points for a loss
(C) Champions

==== Matches ====
10 August 1895 First Division	Dundee	1–2	Celtic	Dundee
				Stadium: Carolina Port; Attendance: 10,000

17 August 1895 First Division	Celtic	3–0	Clyde	Glasgow
				Stadium: Celtic Park; Attendance: 8,000

24 August 1895 First Division	Hibernian	4–2	Celtic	Edinburgh
				Stadium: Easter Road; Attendance: 10,000

31 August 1895 First Division	Celtic	4–0	St Mirren	Glasgow
				Stadium: Celtic Park; Attendance: 5,000

7 September 1895 First Division	Rangers	2–4	Celtic	Glasgow
				Stadium: Ibrox Park; Attendance: 16,000

14 September 1895 First Division	Celtic	0–5	Heart of Midlothian	Glasgow
				Stadium: Celtic Park; Attendance: 18,000

16 September 1895 First Division	St Bernard's	3–0	Celtic	Edinburgh
				Stadium: New Logie Green; Attendance: 5,000

28 September 1895 First Division	Dumbarton	2–3	Celtic	Dumbarton
				Stadium: Boghead Park; Attendance: 4,000

5 October 1895 First Division	Celtic	3–1	Hibernian	Glasgow
				Stadium: Celtic Park; Attendance: 20,000

12 October 1895 First Division	Clyde	1–5	Celtic	Glasgow
				Stadium: Broomfield Park; Attendance: 7,000

26 October 1895 First Division	Celtic	11 – 0	Dundee	Glasgow
				Stadium: Celtic Park; Attendance: 11,500

9 November 1895 First Division	Celtic	7–0	Third Lanark	Glasgow
				Stadium: Celtic Park; Attendance: 3,000

23 November 1895 First Division	Hearts	1–4	Celtic	Edinburgh
				Stadium: Tynecastle Park; Attendance: 16,500

30 November 1895 First Division	St Mirren	1–3	Celtic	Paisley
				Stadium: St Mirren Park, Love Street; Attendance: 4,000

7 December 1895 First Division	Celtic	2–1	St Bernard's	Glasgow
				Stadium: Celtic Park; Attendance: 1,000

14 December 1895 First Division	Celtic	6–2	Rangers	Glasgow
				Stadium: Celtic Park; Attendance: 25,500

21 December 1895 First Division	Celtic	3–0	Dumbarton	Glasgow
				Stadium: Celtic Park; Attendance: 1,300

29 February 1896 First Division	Third Lanark	1–2	Celtic	Glasgow
				Stadium: Cathkin Park; Attendance: 8,000

=== Scottish Cup ===
18 January 1896 First round	Celtic	2–4	Queen's Park	Glasgow
				Stadium: Celtic Park; Attendance: 26,000

=== Friendly ===
20 April 1896 (Note: Reported in some sources (though not a contemporary match report) as being an unofficial British/World Championship – Aston Villa had just won the 1895–96 Football League title.)	Celtic	3–2	Aston Villa	Glasgow
	McMahon 44' 89'; Ferguson	Report	Campbell 3'; Devey 85'	Stadium: Celtic Park; Attendance: 8,000; Referee: Mr Dickson
