= 1892–93 Heart of Midlothian F.C. season =

Heart of Midlothian
1892–93 season
- Stadium: Tynecastle Park
- Scottish Football League: 5th
- Scottish Cup: 3rd Round
- East of Scotland Shield: Winners

During the 1892–93 season Hearts competed in the Scottish Football League, the Scottish Cup and the East of Scotland Shield.

== Fixtures ==
=== East of Scotland Shield ===
21 January 1893 East of Scotland Shield R1	Broxburn	0–3	Hearts	Albyn Park

28 January 1893 East of Scotland Shield SF	Hearts	5–0	Polton Vale	Tynecastle Park

25 February 1893 East of Scotland Shield Final	Hearts	3–1	St Bernard's	Tynecastle Park

=== Rosebery Charity Cup ===
20 May 1893 Rosebery Charity Cup SF	Leith Athletic	2–5	Hearts	Bank Park

27 May 1893 Rosebery Charity Cup Final	Hearts	3–3	Hibernian	Powderhall

=== Scottish Cup ===
26 November 1892 Scottish Cup R1	Stenhousemuir	1–1	Hearts	Ochilview Park
				Attendance: 2,000

17 December 1892 Scottish Cup R1 Replay	Hearts	8–0	Stenhousemuir	Tynecastle Park
				Attendance: 2,500

24 December 1892 Scottish Cup R2	Motherwell	2–4	Hearts	Dalziel Park
				Attendance: 2,000

4 February 1893 Scottish Cup R3	Hearts	1–1	Queen's Park	Tynecastle Park
				Attendance: 13,500

11 February 1893 Scottish Cup R3 Replay	Queen's Park	5–2	Hearts	Hampden Park
				Attendance: 16,000

=== Scottish Football League ===
20 August 1892 Scottish Football League	Third Lanark	1–4	Hearts	Cathkin Park
				Attendance: 400

27 August 1892 Scottish Football League	Hearts	3–1	Celtic	Tynecastle Park
				Attendance: 8,000

3 September 1892 Scottish Football League	Abercorn	3–4	Hearts	Underwood Park
				Attendance: 5,000

10 September 1892 Scottish Football League	Hearts	2–2	Renton	Tynecastle Park
				Attendance: 3,500

17 September 1892 Scottish Football League	Leith Athletic	1–3	Hearts	Bank Park
				Attendance: 5,000

24 September 1892 Scottish Football League	Hearts	4–0	St Mirren	Tynecastle Park
				Attendance: 4,500

1 October 1892 Scottish Football League	Renton	4–1	Hearts	Tontine Park
				Attendance: 2,000

8 October 1892 Scottish Football League	Hearts	1–3	Dumbarton	Tynecastle Park
				Attendance: 3,500

15 October 1892 Scottish Football League	Clyde	2–3	Hearts	Barrowfield Park
				Attendance: 4,000

5 November 1892 Scottish Football League	Celtic	5–0	Hearts	Celtic Park
				Attendance: 10,000

18 February 1893 Scottish Football League	St Mirren	3–1	Hearts	Westmarch Park
				Attendance: 3,000

4 March 1893 Scottish Football League	Hearts	2–2	Third Lanark	Tynecastle Park
				Attendance: 1,500

11 March 1893 Scottish Football League	Hearts	3–1	Abercorn	Tynecastle Park
				Attendance: 2,500

18 March 1893 Scottish Football League	Hearts	1–2	Rangers	Tynecastle Park
				Attendance: 3,000

1 April 1893 Scottish Football League	Dumbarton	5–1	Hearts	Boghead Park
				Attendance: 1,500

15 April 1893 Scottish Football League	Hearts	3–1	Leith Athletic	Tynecastle Park
				Attendance: 3,500

29 April 1893 Scottish Football League	Hearts	2–3	Clyde	Tynecastle Park
				Attendance: 1,500

6 May 1893 Scottish Football League	Rangers	2–1	Hearts	Ibrox Park
				Attendance: 7,000

== See also ==
- List of Heart of Midlothian F.C. seasons
