= James Blessington =

Scottish footballer

Personal information
- Date of birth: 28 February 1874
- Place of birth: Linlithgow, Scotland
- Date of death: 18 April 1939 (aged 65)
- Place of death: Newton Abbott, England
- Height: 5 ft 7 in (1.70 m)
- Position: Inside right

Youth career
- Harp Athletic

Senior career*
Years	Team	Apps	(Gls)
1890–1892	Hibernian		
1891–1892	→ Leith Athletic (loan)	20	(8)
1892–1898	Celtic	83	(31)
1898	→ Preston North End (loan)		
1898–1899	Preston North End		
1899	Derby County	2	(0)
1899–1900	Bristol City		
1900–1903	Luton Town		
1903–1909	Leicester Fosse	100	(18)

International career
1892–1898	Scottish League XI	6	(1)
1894–1896	Scotland	4	(0)

Managerial career
- 1907–1909: Leicester Fosse
- * Club domestic league appearances and goals

James Blessington (28 February 1874 – 18 April 1939) was a Scottish football player (an inside right) and manager.

== Playing career ==
=== Club ===
Born in Linlithgow, West Lothian, Blessington began his playing career with several Edinburgh sides, including Hibernian (then temporarily known as Leith Hibernians) and Leith Athletic, before moving to Glasgow to join Celtic in 1892. He spent six seasons at Celtic Park, earning three Scottish Football League titles (1892–93, 1893–94 and 1895–96).

He moved to England in 1898, spending short periods with Preston North End, Derby County, Bristol City followed by three years at Luton Town and his longest spell at Leicester Fosse between 1903 and 1909.

=== International ===
Blessington was capped four times by the Scotland national team between 1894 and 1896 during his time with Celtic. He also made six appearances for the Scottish League representative side, scoring one goal.

== Managerial career and later life ==
Between 1907 and 1909 Blessington acted as player-manager of Leicester Fosse (though he played only very occasionally), becoming that club's first manager, and was in charge for a total of 84 games.

He then moved to Ireland, where he helped coach Belfast Celtic and also assisted the Irish Amateur Athletic Association as a handicapper. He later moved to Newton Abbot in Devon, where he ran a pub.
