= Lawrence Bell (footballer) =

Scottish footballer (1872–1945)

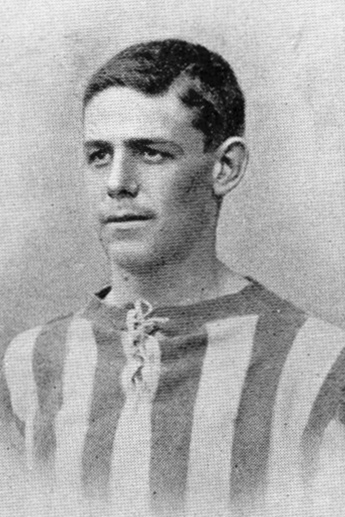
- Bell while with West Bromwich Albion in 1904.

Personal information
- Full name: Lawrence Bell
- Date of birth: 31 December 1872
- Place of birth: Dumbarton, Scotland
- Date of death: 7 April 1945 (aged 72)
- Place of death: Dumfries, Scotland
- Positions: Centre forward; outside right

Youth career
- Langbank

Senior career*
Years	Team	Apps	(Gls)
1892–1894	Dumbarton	29	(12)
1894–1895	Third Lanark	13	(7)
1895–1897	The Wednesday	46	(13)
1897–1899	Everton	41	(16)
1899–1903	Bolton Wanderers	99	(43)
1903–1904	Brentford	25	(4)
1904–1905	West Bromwich Albion	16	(6)
1905	Hibernian	?	(?)
Total		269	(100)

International career
1895	Scottish League XI	1	(1)
- * Club domestic league appearances and goals

Lawrence Bell (31 December 1872 – 7 April 1945), sometimes known as Laurie Bell or Lawrie Bell, was a Scottish professional footballer who played as a centre forward and outside right. He is most notable for his time in the Football League with The Wednesday and Bolton Wanderers. He represented the Scottish League XI.

== Club career ==
Bell began his playing career with hometown Scottish League club Dumbarton in 1892, before transferring to Third Lanark in 1894. After joining First Division club The Wednesday in 1895, he played the remainder of his career in England. In his first season with The Wednesday, Bell was a member of the club's FA Cup-winning team. After departing Olive Grove in 1897 and then spending two seasons with Everton (one playing alongside his elder brother Jack, previously also a Dumbarton teammate), Bell's most successful goalscoring period came with First Division club Bolton Wanderers, for whom he scored 45 goals in 103 appearances between 1899 and 1903. After leaving Burnden Park, he ended his career with spells at Brentford and West Bromwich Albion.

== Representative career ==
Bell scored on his only appearance for the Scottish League XI, in a 4–1 victory over their Irish counterparts on 2 February 1895.

== Personal life ==
Bell was the younger brother of Scottish international Jack Bell.

== Career statistics ==
Appearances and goals by club, season and competition
Club	Season	League			National cup (Note: Includes Scottish Cup, FA Cup)		Other		Total	
Club	Season	Division	Apps	Goals	Apps	Goals	Apps	Goals	Apps	Goals
Dumbarton	1892–93	Scottish League	11	9	2	2	0	0	13	11
Dumbarton	1893–94	Scottish League Division One	18	3	2	1	0	0	20	4
Dumbarton	Total		29	12	4	3	0	0	33	15
Third Lanark	1894–95	Scottish League Division One	12	7	0	0	2 (Note: Appearances in Glasgow Cup)	2	14	9
The Wednesday	1895–96	First Division	24	7	6	3	—		30	10
The Wednesday	1896–97	First Division	23	3	1	0	—		24	3
The Wednesday	Total		47	10	7	3	—		54	13
Everton	1897–98	First Division	23	12	5	3	—		28	15
Everton	1898–99	First Division	18	5	2	0	—		20	5
Everton	Total		41	17	7	3	—		48	20
Bolton Wanderers	1900–01 (Note: Laurie Bell at WorldFootball.net)	First Division	33	8	0	0	—		33	8
Bolton Wanderers	1901–02	First Division	17	7	0	0	—		17	7
Bolton Wanderers	Total		99	44	4	1	—		103	45
Brentford	1903–04	Southern League First Division	25	4	3	0	—		28	4
West Bromwich Albion	1904–05	Second Division	16	6	1	0	—		17	6
Career total			269	100	26	10	2	2	297	112

== Honours ==
Dumbarton

- Dumbartonshire Cup: 1892–93, 1893–94

The Wednesday

- FA Cup: 1895–96

== See also ==
- List of Bolton Wanderers F.C. players
- List of Scottish football families
- List of Sheffield Wednesday F.C. players
