= 1897–98 Scottish Football League =

Scottish football season

Statistics of the Scottish Football League in season 1897–98.

== Overview ==
Celtic are champions of the Scottish Division One.

Kilmarnock won the Scottish Division Two but were not promoted.

== Scottish League Division One ==
| Pos | Team | Pld | W | D | L | GF | GA | GD | Pts | Qualification or relegation |
|---|---|---|---|---|---|---|---|---|---|---|
| 1 | Celtic (C) | 18 | 15 | 3 | 0 | 56 | 13 | +43 | 33 | Champions |
| 2 | Rangers | 18 | 13 | 3 | 2 | 71 | 15 | +56 | 29 | |
| 3 | Hibernian | 18 | 10 | 2 | 6 | 47 | 29 | +18 | 22 | |
| 4 | Heart of Midlothian | 18 | 8 | 4 | 6 | 54 | 33 | +21 | 20 | |
| 5 | St Mirren | 18 | 8 | 2 | 8 | 30 | 36 | −6 | 18 | |
| 5 | Third Lanark | 18 | 8 | 2 | 8 | 37 | 38 | −1 | 18 | |
| 7 | Dundee | 18 | 5 | 3 | 10 | 29 | 36 | −7 | 13 (Note: Dundee and Partick Thistle finished level on points but Dundee won a play-off match to determine ranking positions.) | |
| 8 | Partick Thistle | 18 | 6 | 1 | 11 | 34 | 64 | −30 | 13 | |
| 9 | St Bernard's | 18 | 4 | 1 | 13 | 35 | 67 | −32 | 9 | |
| 10 | Clyde | 18 | 1 | 3 | 14 | 21 | 83 | −62 | 5 | |

Source: statto.com
Rules for classification: Teams finish equal if level on points. Points system: 2 points for a win, 1 point for a draw, 0 points for a loss
(C) Champions

== Scottish League Division Two ==
| Pos | Team | Pld | W | D | L | GF | GA | GD | Pts | Qualification or relegation |
|---|---|---|---|---|---|---|---|---|---|---|
| 1 | Kilmarnock (C) | 18 | 14 | 1 | 3 | 64 | 29 | +35 | 29 | |
| 2 | Port Glasgow Athletic | 18 | 12 | 1 | 5 | 66 | 36 | +30 | 25 | |
| 3 | Morton | 18 | 9 | 4 | 5 | 47 | 38 | +9 | 22 | |
| 4 | Leith Athletic | 18 | 9 | 2 | 7 | 40 | 39 | +1 | 20 | |
| 5 | Abercorn | 18 | 6 | 4 | 8 | 33 | 41 | −8 | 16 | |
| 5 | Ayr | 18 | 7 | 2 | 9 | 36 | 43 | −7 | 16 | |
| 5 | Linthouse | 18 | 6 | 4 | 8 | 38 | 39 | −1 | 16 | |
| 8 | Airdrieonians | 18 | 6 | 2 | 10 | 45 | 56 | −11 | 14 | |
| 9 | Hamilton Academical | 14 | 5 | 2 | 7 | 26 | 32 | −6 | 12 (Note: Hamilton Academical took Renton's place in the league and fulfilled the club's remaining fixtures.) | |
| 10 | Motherwell | 18 | 3 | 4 | 11 | 31 | 56 | −25 | 10 | |
| - | Renton (R) | 4 | 0 | 0 | 4 | 2 | 19 | −17 | 0 | Resigned (Note: Renton resigned after playing four games.) |

Source: statto.com
Rules for classification: Teams finish equal if level on points. Points system: 2 points for a win, 1 point for a draw, 0 points for a loss
(C) Champions; (R) Relegated

== See also ==
- 1897–98 in Scottish football
