= James Ellis (footballer) =

Scottish footballer (1867–1939)

Personal information
- Date of birth: 27 May 1867
- Place of birth: Bathgate, Scotland
- Date of death: 16 April 1939 (aged 71)
- Place of death: Champion, Alberta, Canada
- Position: Inside right

Senior career*
Years	Team	Apps	(Gls)
1888–1892	Mossend Swifts		
1892–1893	Third Lanark	12	(3)
–	Leith Athletic		
- * Club domestic league appearances and goals

James Ellis (27 May 1867 – 16 April 1939) was a Scottish footballer who played as an inside right for Mossend Swifts, Third Lanark and Leith Athletic.

== Personal life ==
Ellis's brother Dave was also a footballer, and played alongside James at Mossend Swifts. As a result, some sources erroneously attributed a Scotland national team cap against Ireland to James, when in fact David was the player who appeared.
