= Allan Martin (footballer) =

Scottish footballer (1872–1906)

Personal information
- Date of birth: 26 February 1872
- Place of birth: Giffnock, Scotland
- Date of death: 12 May 1906 (aged 34)
- Place of death: Springburn, Scotland
- Position: Centre forward

Senior career*
Years	Team	Apps	(Gls)
1889–1892	Northern		
1892–1893	Rangers	2	(0)
1892	→ Northern (loan)		
1893	→ Leith Athletic (loan)		
1893–1895	Hibernian	32	(27)
1895–1896	Celtic	17	(18)
1896–1899	Hibernian	40	(17)

International career
1892	Scottish Alliance XI	1	(0)
1896	Scottish League XI	1	(3)
- * Club domestic league appearances and goals

Allan Martin (26 February 1872 – 12 May 1906) was a Scottish footballer who played for Rangers, Leith Athletic, Celtic and Hibernian. He finished as the top scorer in the Scottish Football League Division One in the 1895–96 season.

== Career ==
Raised in Glasgow and trained as an iron works furnace tender (a trade he was reluctant to curtail as his reputation as a footballer increased), Martin began his career as a half back with Northern F.C. and was selected for the Scottish Football Alliance XI against the rival Scottish Football League in 1892. He soon joined Rangers but played only two league matches for the club, going back to Northern before the end of the year (during which time he was selected to represent the Glasgow FA in their annual challenge match against Sheffield), moving on to Leith Athletic for another short period, and thereafter joining Hibernian in 1893. In his first spell with the Easter Road club, Martin helped Hibs win Scottish Division Two in the inaugural 1893–94 campaign and again in 1894–95, the latter leading to election to Division One; they also won the Rosebery Charity Cup in 1894 with a 4–2 win over Hearts (featuring a Martin hat-trick).

In summer 1895 he moved to Celtic due to being offered higher wages; in his single season with the Bhoys, he scored 21 goals in 22 matches – 18 in 17 in the League, finishing national top goalscorer – as Celtic won Division One, the Glasgow Cup and the Glasgow Merchants Charity Cup; he played but did not score in the 11–0 league win over Dundee which remains the club's record margin of victory.

Martin then returned to Hibernian, but was less prolific in his second spell with 19 goals in 45 League and Scottish Cup appearances between August 1896 and December 1898. The club finished league runners-up in 1896–97 and won the Rosebery Cup at the end of that season.

Martin's last appearance for Hibernian was their 0–10 defeat to Rangers on Christmas Day 1898. There is little recorded evidence of his career after leaving Hibs at the approximate age of 27, when in theory he would have been in his athletic prime but perhaps less so with the demands of his labour-intensive job and possible deteriorating health. Certainly he died aged 33 in 1906 'after a long illness', from multiple causes including tuberculosis.

Martin represented the Scottish League once, in February 1896 while playing for Celtic. He scored all three of the SFL goals in a 3–2 win over the Irish League XI.

== See also ==
- Played for Celtic and Rangers
