= 1891–92 Heart of Midlothian F.C. season =

Heart of Midlothian
1891–92 season
- Stadium: Tynecastle Park
- Scottish Football League: 3rd
- Scottish Cup: Quarter-final
- East of Scotland Shield: Winners

During the 1891–92 season Hearts competed in the Scottish Football League, the Scottish Cup and the East of Scotland Shield.

== Results ==
=== Friendlies ===
8 August 1891 Friendly	Leith Athletic	1–0	Hearts	Bank Park

18 August 1891 Friendly	St Bernards	3–3	Hearts	New Logie Green

1 January 1892 Friendly	Hearts	6–3	London Casuals	Tynecastle Park

2 January 1892 Friendly	Hearts	7–1	Dumbarton	Tynecastle Park

2 April 1892 Friendly	Hearts	2–1	Leith Athletic	Tynecastle Park

18 April 1892 Friendly	Hearts	2–0	West Bromwich Albion	Tynecastle Park

16 May 1892 Friendly	St Bernards	1–3	Hearts	New Logie Green

20 May 1892 Friendly	Victoria United	1–3	Hearts	Central Park

21 May 1892 Friendly	Inverness Caledonian	0–2	Hearts	Caledonian Park

31 May 1892 Friendly	Wishaw Thistle	2–5	Hearts	Recreation Park, Wishaw

=== Scottish Football League ===
15 August 1891 Scottish Football League	Hearts	3–1	Celtic	Tynecastle Park
				Attendance: 4,500

22 August 1891 Scottish Football League	St Mirren	2–5	Hearts	Westmarch Park
				Attendance: 4,000

29 August 1891 Scottish Football League	Hearts	3–1	Dumbarton	Tynecastle Park
				Attendance: 7,000

5 September 1891 Scottish Football League	Cambuslang	3–3	Hearts	Whitefield Park
				Attendance: 1,500

12 September 1891 Scottish Football League	Hearts	4–2	Renton	Tynecastle Park
				Attendance: 3,000

19 September 1891 Scottish Football League	Dumbarton	5–1	Hearts	Boghead Park
				Attendance: 3,000

21 September 1891 Scottish Football League	Hearts	2–1	Abercorn	Tynecastle Park
				Attendance: 4,000

26 September 1891 Scottish Football League	Hearts	2–0	Third Lanark	Tynecastle Park
				Attendance: 3,000

3 October 1891 Scottish Football League	Clyde	3–10	Hearts	Barrowfield Park
				Attendance: 4,000

10 October 1891 Scottish Football League	Hearts	2–2	St Mirren	Tynecastle Park
				Attendance: 4,500

17 October 1891 Scottish Football League	Celtic	3–1	Hearts	Celtic Park
				Attendance: 16,000

24 October 1891 Scottish Football League	Hearts	3–1	Leith Athletic	Tynecastle Park
				Attendance: 4,000

31 October 1891 Scottish Football League	Vale Of Leven	2–2	Hearts	Millburn Park
				Attendance: 3,000

7 November 1891 Scottish Football League	Hearts	6–1	Vale Of Leven	Tynecastle Park
				Attendance: 3,000

21 November 1891 Scottish Football League	Rangers	0–1	Hearts	Ibrox Park
				Attendance: 5,000

26 December 1891 Scottish Football League	Hearts	1–0	Cambuslang	Tynecastle Park
				Attendance: 2,000

12 March 1892 Scottish Football League	Abercorn	1–3	Hearts	Underwood Park
				Attendance: 2,000

19 March 1892 Scottish Football League	Hearts	7–0	Vale Of Leven	Tynecastle Park
				Attendance: 2,000

9 April 1892 Scottish Football League	Renton	0–3	Hearts	Tontine Park
				Attendance: 1,000

16 April 1892 Scottish Football League	Hearts	2–1	Clyde	Tynecastle Park
				Attendance: 3,000

23 April 1892 Scottish Football League	Hearts	3–2	Rangers	Tynecastle Park
				Attendance: 4,500

30 April 1892 Scottish Football League	Leith Athletic	2–2	Hearts	Bank Park
				Attendance: 6,000

7 May 1892 Scottish Football League	Third Lanark	3–2	Hearts	Cathkin Park
				Attendance: 1,500

=== Scottish Cup ===
28 November 1891 Scottish Cup first round	Hearts	3–1 (abandoned)	Clyde	Tynecastle Park

5 December 1891 Scottish Cup first round	Hearts	8–0	Clyde	Tynecastle Park
				Attendance: 1,000

19 December 1891 Scottish Cup second round	Broxburn Shamrock	4–5	Hearts	Shamrock Park
				Attendance: 2,500

23 January 1892 Scottish Cup third round	Renton	4–4	Hearts	Tontine Park
				Attendance: 2,000

30 January 1892 Scottish Cup third round replay	Hearts	2–2	Renton	Tynecastle Park
				Attendance: 13,000

6 February 1892 Scottish Cup third round second replay	Hearts	2–3	Renton	Hampden Park
				Attendance: 14,000

=== East of Scotland Shield ===
12 December 1891 EoSS First Round	Hearts	3–1	Mossend Swifts	Tynecastle Park

13 February 1892 EoSS Semi-Final	Hearts	3–2	Armadale	Tynecastle Park

27 February 1892 EoSS Final	Hearts	2–0	St Bernards	Old Logie Green

=== Rosebery Charity Cup ===
14 May 1892 Rosebery Charity Cup Semi-Final	Hearts	4–2	Mossend Swifts	Old Logie Green

28 May 1892 Rosebery Charity Cup Final	Hearts	2–1	Leith Athletic	Old Logie Green

== See also ==
- List of Heart of Midlothian F.C. seasons
