= William Bowie (footballer) =

Scottish footballer

William Bowie (31 December 1869 – 9 June 1934) was a Scottish footballer who played for Linthouse, Clyde and Scotland. He was the only serving Linthouse player to have been selected for international duty.
