= John Lambie (footballer, born 1868) =

Scottish footballer

Johnny Lambie
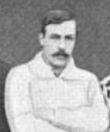
- Lambie with London Caledonians in 1894

Personal information
- Full name: John Alexander Lambie
- Date of birth: 18 December 1868
- Place of birth: Gorbals, Glasgow, Scotland
- Date of death: 25 December 1923 (aged 55)
- Place of death: London, England
- Position: Forward

Senior career*
Years	Team	Apps	(Gls)
1885–1888	Queen's Park		
- London Caledonians
- Corinthian,
- Swifts
1893–1894	Queen's Park		

International career
1887–1888	Scotland	2	(0)
- * Club domestic league appearances and goals

John Alexander Lambie (18 December 1868 – 25 December 1923) was a Scottish footballer who played as a forward in the 1880s and 1890s.

Lambie holds the record of being the youngest Scotland captain of all time; additionally, he was the youngest player to ever play for Scotland from his debut in 1887 until 2025, when the record was broken by James Wilson.

== Career ==
Lambie was a regular in the Queen's Park first team by the age of 16, and quickly won the Scottish Cup in 1886. He had been due to make his international debut for Scotland in a game against Ireland on 20 March 1886 aged 17 but had to withdraw at short notice, and due to his replacement James Kelly scoring (on his own debut) this has been recorded erroneously as among the youngest feats of international goalscoring. However, Lambie was still barely 18 when he did play against the same opposition on 19 February 1887 in a 4–1 win for Scotland and was appointed captain for the occasion, setting national records (the captaincy record still stands as of 2025, in which year the appearance record was broken by James Wilson; in 1888, Willie Groves set the mark for youngest goalscorer). In an era when international fixtures were far less common than modern times and with differing selection conventions, Lambie's second and final cap was against England on 17 March 1888; Scotland lost 5–0.

His international career was effectively ended when he moved to London for business reasons in May 1888, where he appeared for London Caledonians, the Corinthians, Swifts and the city's representative side. He made a guest appearance for Queen's Park under a pseudonym in the 1892 Scottish Cup Final, then featured more regularly for the Spiders in the 1893–94 season before returning to England.

== Personal life ==
His younger brother William was also a noted footballer with Queen's Park and Scotland (he too won the Scottish Cup and made his international debut while a teenager); A third brother, Robert, also featured for Queen's Park; the three siblings' careers barely overlapped in terms of playing together.

== See also ==
- List of Scotland national football team captains
- List of Scottish football families
