= Pat Murray (footballer) =

Scottish footballer

Patrick Murray (6 May 1874 – 25 December 1925) was a Scottish footballer who played for Hibernian and Scotland.
