= William Blair (Scottish footballer) =

Association football player

Personal information
- Date of birth: 11 March 1872
- Place of birth: Greenock, Scotland
- Position: Left half

Senior career*
Years	Team	Apps	(Gls)
–	Morton		
1891–1897	Third Lanark	91	(7)
1897–1902	Morton	40	(7)
Total		131	(14)

International career
1896	Scotland	1	(0)
- * Club domestic league appearances and goals

William Blair (born 11 March 1872) was a Scottish footballer who played as a left half for Greenock Morton, Third Lanark and Scotland. He was also an accomplished rower.
