= Kenneth Anderson (footballer) =

Scottish footballer (1875–1900)

Personal information
- Date of birth: 23 July 1875
- Place of birth: Glasgow, Scotland
- Date of death: 27 August 1900 (aged 25)
- Position: Goalkeeper

Senior career*
Years	Team	Apps	(Gls)
1894–1900	Queen's Park		

International career
1896–1898	Scotland	3	(0)
- * Club domestic league appearances and goals

Kenneth Anderson (23 July 1875 – 27 August 1900) was a Scottish footballer, who played as a goalkeeper for Queen's Park and Scotland.
