= 1895–96 Scottish Football League =

Scottish football season

Statistics of the Scottish Football League in season 1895–96.

== Overview ==
Celtic topped the Scottish Division One.

Abercorn came first in the Scottish Division Two. Leith Athletic and Renton finished second and third

== Scottish League Division One ==
Pos	Team	Pld	W	D	L	GF	GA	GD	Pts	Qualification or relegation
1	Celtic (C)	18	15	0	3	64	25	+39	30	Champions
2	Rangers	18	11	4	3	57	39	+18	26	
3	Hibernian	18	11	2	5	58	39	+19	24	
4	Heart of Midlothian	18	11	0	7	68	36	+32	22	
5	Dundee	18	7	2	9	33	42	−9	16	
6	St Bernard's	18	7	1	10	36	53	−17	15	
6	Third Lanark	18	7	1	10	47	51	−4	15	
8	St Mirren	18	5	3	10	31	51	−20	13	
9	Clyde	18	4	3	11	39	59	−20	11	
10	Dumbarton (R)	18	4	0	14	36	74	−38	8	Relegated to the 1896–97 Scottish Division Two

Source: "1895-1896 Division 1 - SPFL Archive". SPFL.
Rules for classification: Teams finish equal if level on points. Points system: 2 points for a win, 1 point for a draw, 0 points for a loss
(C) Champions; (R) Relegated

== Scottish League Division Two ==
Pos	Team	Pld	W	D	L	GF	GA	GD	Pts	Promotion or relegation
1	Abercorn (C, P)	18	12	3	3	55	31	+24	27	Promoted to the 1896–97 Scottish First Division
2	Leith Athletic	18	11	1	6	55	37	+18	23	
3	Kilmarnock	18	10	1	7	51	46	+5	21	
3	Renton	18	9	3	6	40	28	+12	21	
5	Airdrieonians	18	7	4	7	48	44	+4	18	
5	Partick Thistle	18	8	2	8	46	54	−8	18	
7	Port Glasgow Athletic	18	6	4	8	40	41	−1	16	
8	Motherwell	18	5	3	10	31	52	−21	13	
9	Morton	18	4	4	10	32	42	−10	12	
10	Linthouse	18	5	1	12	26	49	−23	11	

Source: statto.com
Rules for classification: Teams finish equal if level on points. Points system: 2 points for a win, 1 point for a draw, 0 points for a loss.
(C) Champions; (P) Promoted

== See also ==
- 1895–96 in Scottish football
