= 1896–97 Scottish Division Two =

Scottish Second Division
- Season: 1896–97
- Champions: Partick Thistle
- Promoted: Partick Thistle

The 1896–97 Scottish Second Division was won by Partick Thistle with Dumbarton finishing bottom.

== Table ==
Pos	Team	Pld	W	D	L	GF	GA	GD	Pts	Promotion or relegation
1	Partick Thistle (C, P)	18	14	3	1	61	28	+33	31	Promoted to the 1897–98 Scottish First Division
2	Leith Athletic	18	13	1	4	55	27	+28	27	
3	Airdrieonians	18	10	1	7	49	39	+10	21	
3	Kilmarnock	18	10	1	7	44	33	+11	21	
5	Morton	18	7	2	9	38	40	−2	16	
6	Linthouse	18	8	2	8	44	53	−9	14 (Note: Linthouse were docked four points.)	
6	Renton	18	6	2	10	34	41	−7	14	
8	Motherwell	18	6	1	11	40	55	−15	13	
8	Port Glasgow Athletic	18	4	5	9	38	50	−12	13	
10	Dumbarton (R)	18	2	2	14	27	64	−37	6	Resigned (Note: Dumbarton resigned from the league at the end of the season.)

Source: statto.com
Rules for classification: Teams finish equal if level on points. Points system: 2 points for a win, 1 point for a draw, 0 points for a loss
(C) Champions; (P) Promoted; (R) Relegated
