= Thomas Towie =

Scottish footballer

Personal information
- Full name: Thomas Towie
- Date of birth: 21 November 1868
- Place of birth: Dublin, Ireland
- Date of death: 22 December 1944 (aged 76)
- Place of death: Dumbarton, Scotland
- Position: Forward

Senior career*
Years	Team	Apps	(Gls)
- Dumbarton
1891–1892	Preston North End	22	(9)
- Renton
1892–1893	Celtic	0	(0)
1893–1894	Derby County	8	(1)
- Rossendale
- * Club domestic league appearances and goals

Thomas Towie (21 November 1868 – 22 December 1944) was an Irish footballer who played in the Football League for Derby County and Preston North End in the 1890s.

== Celtic ==
Although Towie never played a league game for Celtic, he featured for them on five occasions in various cup competitions between December 1892 and April 1893 and scored two goals.
