= Andrew Baird (footballer) =

Scottish footballer

Personal information
- Full name: Andrew Baird
- Date of birth: 11 June 1866
- Place of birth: Irvine, Scotland
- Date of death: 1916 (aged 49–50)
- Position: Goalkeeper

Senior career*
Years	Team	Apps	(Gls)
1888–1889	Kilbirnie		
1889–1890	Irvine		
1890–1894	Queen's Park	0	(0)

International career
1892–1894	Scotland	2	(0)
- * Club domestic league appearances and goals

Andrew Baird (11 June 1866 – 1916) was a Scottish amateur footballer who played for Queen's Park as a goalkeeper. He was capped by Scotland at international level.

== Honours ==
Queen's Park

- Scottish Cup: 1892–93
