= Govandale Park =

Football ground in Govan, Scotland

- Location within Glasgow council area
- Location: Govan, Scotland
- Coordinates: 55.865°N 4.314°W
- Surface: Grass
- Record attendance: 10,000

Construction
- Opened: 1894
- Closed: 1912

Tenants
- Linthouse F.C. (1894–1900); Benburb F.C. (1900–1912)

Govandale Park was a football ground in the burgh of Govan, Scotland. It was the home ground of Linthouse F.C. between 1894 and their disbandment in 1900.

== History ==
Linthouse moved to Govandale Park in 1894 from their Langlands Park ground. A narrow stand was erected on the southern side of the pitch, and a pavilion built in the north-east corner of the ground. In contrast to their previous home which was on the southern edge of the town, the new ground was in the heart of the burgh, having previously been the northern portion of the grounds of Govandale House. It was situated slightly west of Govan Old Parish Church and very close to the south bank of the River Clyde. Neither ground was actually in Linthouse which was a neighbourhood further west, however at that time the established local shipbuilding industry was expanding rapidly, with little land available as most was being occupied by yards or tenement housing for their workers; Linthouse (which was independent of Govan until 1901) was home to Alexander Stephen and Sons, while the Fairfield Company premises stretched from Linthouse along the river almost to the western end of Govandale Park.

The club joined Division Two of the Scottish Football League in 1895, and the first SFL match was played at Govandale Park on 17 August 1895, a 2–1 win over Airdrieonians. The probable record attendance of 10,000 was set a few weeks later on 21 September for a Glasgow Cup match against Celtic, with the visitors winning 7–1.

At the end of the 1899–1900 season Linthouse opted not to apply for re-election to the league. Their final SFL match at Govandale Park was on 10 March 1900, a 2–2 draw with Motherwell. The club subsequently folded later in the year.

The ground was taken over by a new version of Benburb F.C. which had had several previous incarnations based in other parts of southern Glasgow; they consolidated in Govan, becoming prominent members of the Scottish Junior Football Association, but moved on again to a ground at Broomloan Road in 1912. Within a few years, the eastern half of the Govandale site was converted into a playpark, while Fairfield were allowed to expand their yard into the western half. In the late 20th century, housing at Wanlock Street was built on the playpark.
