= John Gillespie (footballer, born 1870) =

Scottish footballer

Personal information
- Date of birth: 15 November 1870
- Place of birth: Falkirk, Scotland
- Date of death: 4 September 1933 (aged 62)
- Place of death: Edinburgh, Scotland
- Position: Defender

Youth career
- Comely Park

Senior career*
Years	Team	Apps	(Gls)
- Falkirk
1892–1900	Queen's Park		
- Rangers

International career
1896	Scotland	1	(0)
- * Club domestic league appearances and goals

John Gillespie (15 November 1870 – 4 September 1933) was a Scottish footballer who played as a defender.

== Career ==
Born in Falkirk, Gillespie played club football mainly for Falkirk and Queen's Park, with his amateur status allowing him to make guest appearances for several clubs, including Rangers, Partick Thistle, St Johnstone and Everton. With Queen's Park he won the Scottish Cup in 1893 (after being a losing finalist in 1892), the Glasgow League in 1896–97, and the Glasgow Cup in 1898. He then served in the Imperial Yeomanry in the Boer War.

He made one appearance for Scotland in 1896.

== See also ==
- List of Scotland national football team captains
