= 1895–96 Scottish Division One =

3rd season of top-tier football league in Scotland

Scottish Division One
- Season: 1895–96
- Champions: Celtic; 3rd title
- Relegated: Dumbarton
- Matches: 90
- Goals: 469 (5.21 per match)
- Top goalscorer: Allan Martin (19 goals)

The 1895–96 Scottish Division One season was won by Celtic by four points over nearest rival Rangers.

== League table ==
Pos	Team	Pld	W	D	L	GF	GA	GD	Pts	Qualification or relegation
1	Celtic (C)	18	15	0	3	64	25	+39	30	Champions
2	Rangers	18	11	4	3	57	39	+18	26	
3	Hibernian	18	11	2	5	58	39	+19	24	
4	Heart of Midlothian	18	11	0	7	68	36	+32	22	
5	Dundee	18	7	2	9	33	42	−9	16	
6	St Bernard's	18	7	1	10	36	53	−17	15	
6	Third Lanark	18	7	1	10	47	51	−4	15	
8	St Mirren	18	5	3	10	31	51	−20	13	
9	Clyde	18	4	3	11	39	59	−20	11	
10	Dumbarton (R)	18	4	0	14	36	74	−38	8	Relegated to the 1896–97 Scottish Division Two

Source: "1895-1896 Division 1 - SPFL Archive". SPFL.
Rules for classification: Teams finish equal if level on points. Points system: 2 points for a win, 1 point for a draw, 0 points for a loss
(C) Champions; (R) Relegated

== Results ==
Home \ Away	CEL	CLY	DUM	DND	HOM	HIB	RAN	STB	STM	THI
Celtic		3–0	3–0	11–0	0–5	3–1	6–2	2–1	4–0	7–0
Clyde	1–5		5–1	0–1	1–2	0–3	2–2	5–0	1–3	2–7
Dumbarton	2–3	5–4		1–2	2–9	1–3	3–5	4–3	4–2	2–4
Dundee	1–2	1–2	4–1		5–0	2–0	1–3	4–1	1–1	2–0
Heart of Midlothian	1–4	9–1	7–0	2–0		4–3	1–2	6–0	5–1	3–0
Hibernian	4–2	4–3	7–2	3–1	3–2		1–1	2–3	5–1	2–5
Rangers	2–4	4–4	3–1	3–1	7–2	4–0		2–0	3–3	0–4
St Bernard's	3–0	1–4	4–3	4–2	0–5	2–5	3–4		4–3	4–1
St Mirren	1–3	2–2	1–2	3–1	2–1	1–3	1–7	1–3		3–2
Third Lanark	1–2	6–2	5–2	3–4	5–4	2–7	2–3	0–0	0–2	

Legend: Blue = home team win; Yellow = draw; Red = away team win.
