= 1893–94 Scottish Football League =

Scottish football season

Statistics of the Scottish Football League in season 1893–94.

== Overview ==
Celtic became Scottish Division One champions. Renton were relegated, Dundee and Leith Athletic re-elected to Division One.

Clyde were elected to Division One, Hibernian and Cowlairs remained in the Scottish Division Two. Port Glasgow Athletic were docked seven points for fielding an ineligible player.

== Scottish League Division One ==
Pos	Team	Pld	W	D	L	GF	GA	GD	Pts	Relegation
1	Celtic (C)	18	14	1	3	53	32	+21	29	Champions
2	Heart of Midlothian	18	11	4	3	46	32	+14	26	
3	St Bernard's	18	11	1	6	53	39	+14	23	
4	Rangers	18	8	4	6	44	30	+14	20	
5	Dumbarton	18	7	5	6	32	35	−3	19	
6	St Mirren	18	7	3	8	49	47	+2	17	
7	Third Lanark	18	7	3	8	38	44	−6	17	
8	Dundee	18	6	3	9	47	59	−12	15	
9	Leith Athletic	18	4	2	12	36	46	−10	10	
10	Renton (R)	18	1	2	15	23	57	−34	4	Relegated to the 1894–95 Scottish Division Two

Source: worldfootball.net, Scottish Professional Football League
Rules for classification: Points system: 2 points for a win, 1 point for a draw, 0 points for a loss.
(C) Champions; (R) Relegated

== Scottish League Division Two ==
Pos	Team	Pld	W	D	L	GF	GA	GD	Pts	Qualification or relegation
1	Hibernian (C)	18	13	3	2	83	29	+54	29	
2	Cowlairs	18	13	1	4	72	32	+40	27	
3	Clyde (P)	18	11	2	5	51	36	+15	24	Elected to 1894–95 Scottish Division One
4	Motherwell	18	11	1	6	61	46	+15	23	
5	Partick Thistle	18	10	0	8	56	58	−2	20	
6	Port Glasgow Athletic	18	9	2	7	52	52	0	13 (Note: Port Glasgow Athletic were deducted 7 points for fielding an ineligible player.)	
7	Abercorn	18	5	2	11	42	60	−18	12	
8	Morton	18	4	1	13	36	62	−26	9	Re-elected
8	Northern	18	3	3	12	29	66	−37	9	Not re-elected (Note: Northern were not re-elected and Thistle did not apply for re-election. Dundee Wanderers and Airdrieonians were elected in their place.)
10	Thistle	18	2	3	13	31	72	−41	7	Did not apply for re-election

Updated to match(es) played on May 2013. Source: statto.com, SFHA
Rules for classification: Teams finish equal if level on points. Points system: 2 points for a win, 1 point for a draw, 0 points for a loss.
(C) Champions; (P) Promoted

== See also ==
- 1893–94 in Scottish football
