= Alf Smith (Scottish footballer) =

Scottish footballer

Personal information
- Full name: Alfred Smith
- Position: Full back

Senior career*
Years	Team	Apps	(Gls)
1891–1894	Dumbarton	40	(0)
1894–1896	Third Lanark	18	(0)
- * Club domestic league appearances and goals

Alfred 'Alf' Smith was a Scottish footballer who played in the early 1890s.

== Career ==
Smith played club football in Scotland and began his career with Dumbarton. He then turned "professional" with a move to Third Lanark.

== Honours ==
Dumbarton

- Scottish League: Champions 1891–1892
- Dumbartonshire Cup: Winners 1891–1892;1892–1893;1893–1894
