= William Gulliland =

Scottish footballer

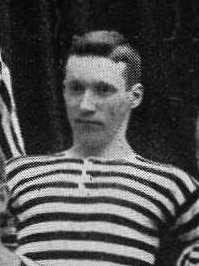
Gulliland in Queen's Park kit, 1890

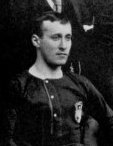
Gulliland in Scotland kit, 1895

William Gulliland (3 February 1871 – 13 March 1928) was a Scottish footballer. He played as a midfielder primarily for Queen's Park and represented Scotland four times.

Gulliland made his international debut against Wales on 21 March 1891.
