= Tom Waddell (footballer) =

Scottish footballer

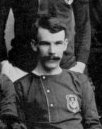
Waddell in Scotland kit, 1895

Thomas Smith Waddell (born 9 September 1870 – 31 January 1956) was a Scottish footballer, who played for Queen's Park and Scotland.
