= 1892–93 Scottish Football League =

Scottish Football League
- Season: 1892–93
- Champions: Celtic; 1st title
- Relegated: Abercorn and Clyde (not re-elected)
- Matches: 90
- Goals: 388 (4.31 per match)
- Top goalscorer: Sandy McMahon; John Campbell (11 goals)

Statistics of the Scottish Football League in season 1892–93.

== Overview ==
Celtic became Scottish Football League champions for the first time.

== League table ==
Pos	Team	Pld	W	D	L	GF	GA	GD	Pts	Qualification or relegation
1	Celtic (C)	18	14	1	3	54	25	+29	29	Champions
2	Rangers	18	12	4	2	41	27	+14	28	
3	St Mirren	18	9	2	7	40	39	+1	20	
4	Third Lanark	18	9	1	8	53	39	+14	19	
5	Heart of Midlothian	18	8	2	8	39	41	−2	18	
6	Dumbarton	18	8	1	9	35	35	0	17	
6	Leith Athletic	18	8	1	9	35	31	+4	17	
8	Renton	18	5	5	8	31	44	−13	15	Re-elected
9	Abercorn (R)	18	5	1	12	35	52	−17	11	Not re-elected. Joined the 1893–94 Scottish Division Two
10	Clyde (R)	18	2	2	14	25	55	−30	6	Not re-elected. Joined the 1893–94 Scottish Division Two

Source: statto.com
Rules for classification: Teams finish equal if level on points. Points system: 2 points for a win, 1 point for a draw, 0 points for a loss
(C) Champions; (R) Relegated

== Results ==
Home \ Away	ABC	CEL	CLY	DUM	HOM	LEI	RAN	REN	STM	THI
Abercorn		4–2	5–1	4–0	3–4	1–0	0–4	1–2	1–2	5–2
Celtic	3–2		3–1	5–1	5–0	3–1	3–0	4–3	4–1	2–5
Clyde	5–2	1–2		1–2	2–3	1–2	0–3	2–2	1–2	2–4
Dumbarton	5–1	0–3	3–1		5–1	2–1	3–0	1–1	1–2	1–2
Heart of Midlothian	3–1	3–1	2–3	1–3		3–1	1–2	2–2	4–0	2–2
Leith Athletic	1–1	0–1	3–0	3–0	1–3		1–2	6–2	5–1	2–1
Rangers	4–3	2–2	4–2	3–2	2–1	3–2		2–0	0–0	2–1
Renton	2–1	0–2	1–1	0–4	4–1	2–3	2–2		3–2	3–1
St Mirren	4–0	1–3	8–1	3–2	3–1	4–1	2–2	3–0		1–4
Third Lanark	8–0	0–6	4–1	3–0	1–4	1–2	2–4	6–2	6–1	

Legend: Blue = home team win; Yellow = draw; Red = away team win.
