= Linthouse F.C. =

Former association football club in Scotland

Linthouse
- Full name: Linthouse Football Club
- Nickname(s): The Linties
- Founded: 1881
- Dissolved: 1900
- Ground: Langlands Park, Govan; Govandale Park, Govan
Home colours

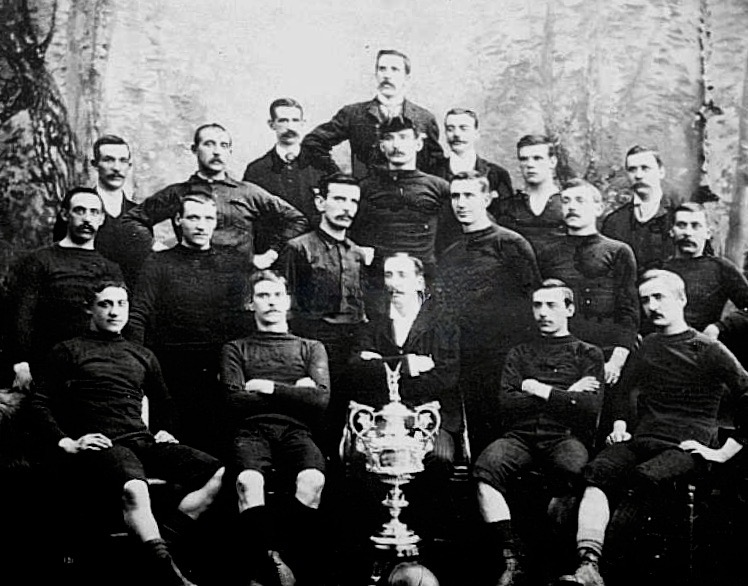
Linthouse Football Club, 1888

Linthouse Football Club was a football club from the Linthouse district of Govan, Scotland. The club played in navy blue.

== History ==
The club were established in 1881 from an athletics club, in an era when the shipbuilding industry in the area was expanding rapidly with thousands moving into the area. The club first came to the attention of the newspapers in 1883.

The club first played in the Scottish Cup in 1885–86, losing to Northern in the first round. Linthouse's best run in the competition came in 1888–89, when it reached the fourth round for the only time. The third round tie at Wishaw Thistle saw the Linties win 8–5 in front of a crowd of 2,000. The Jags won the toss and, contrary to expectations, played into the wind in the first half, but the decision seemed justified with a goal soon after the start; however, by half-time, the Linties had taken a 6–1 lead, which became 7–1 from the start of the second half after a "suspiciously offside" goal. For the next 25 minutes, Wishaw "completely hemmed in" the Linties and brought the score back to 7–5, but a breakaway goal for Linthouse disheartened the home side and finished the scoring. In the fourth round, the club was unlucky to be drawn away to the Cup holders, the Third Lanarkshire Rifle Volunteers, but only lost 2–0, the Linties' play being "exceedingly good and promising".

=== Local competitions and rivalry with Whitefield ===
The club had a rivalry with Govan neighbours Whitefield. Whitefield won the 1886–87 Govan Charity Cup, when, after a draw with Linthouse, Whitefield beat the Linties 2–0 in a replay at Victoria Park (the home of Summerton Athletic). However Linthouse protested and in a further game at Victoria Park, in front of 2,000 fans, the Linties won 3–1. Whitefield put in a counter-protest and was awarded the trophy, possibly on the basis that the Linthouse protest had been invalid.

The clubs were drawn against each other in the first round of the 1887–88 Scottish Cup. The tie at Craigton Park was witnessed by 1,000 spectators and ended 3–3. Whitefield won the replay 2–1 at home, with Linthouse having players cautioned for violent play almost from the start, and "feelings ran high among the spectators" due to the "highly questionable tactics of the Linthouse".

The clubs also met later in the season, in the Govan Jubilee Cup, in a match which attracted a crowd of 2,000, which Whitefield won en route to winning the competition.

The rivalry however swung in Linthouse's favour soon afterwards; in the Govan & Ibrox Cup of 1888–89, before another large crowd of 2,000, the Linties beat Whitefield 9–0, with all nine goals coming in the second half. Linthouse also won the Jubilee Cup that season as well as the Govan & Ibrox for each of the four seasons in which it was played. When the Scottish Football Alliance was formed in 1891–92, Linthouse was a founder member, and Whitefield was left behind without a league competition.

=== Finding a League ===
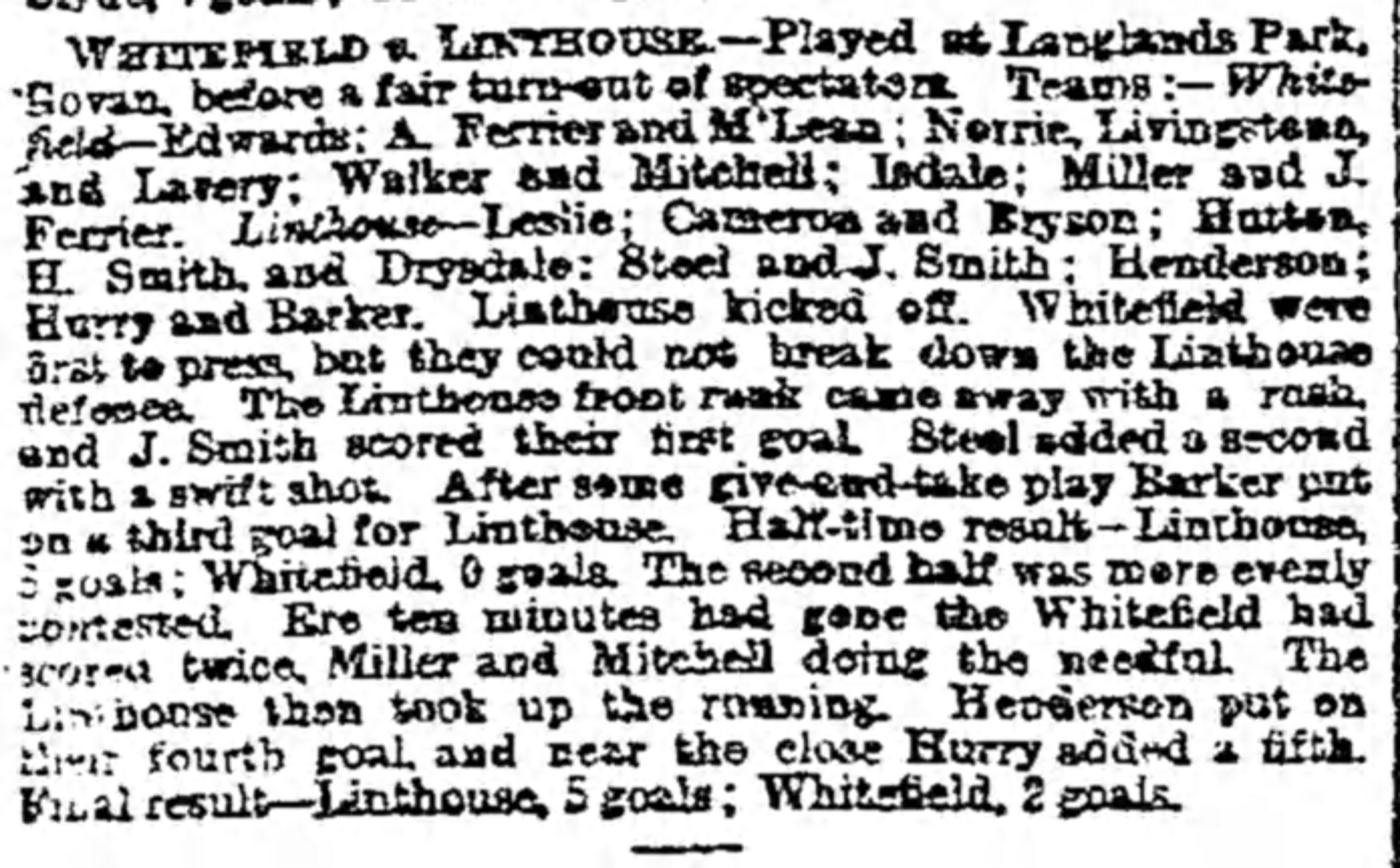
Linthouse 5–2 Whitefield, Glasgow Cup 1st Round, from the Glasgow Herald, 9 November 1891

Linthouse was a member of the Scottish Football Alliance in its inaugural 1891–92 season, and was the league's first champion, despite "some folks saying for the life of them that they can see no great ability in the Linthouse team"; Linthouse clinched the title with a 3–1 win at Port Glasgow Athletic, while second placed Kilmarnock lost at Airdrieonians, which put the Linties 5 points clear of Killie, with the latter having 1 game remaining. The same season saw the club reach the semi-final of the Glasgow Cup for the first time, losing 9–2 to Celtic. The quarter-final was against the now-moribund Whitefield, switched from Whitefield to Langlands Park "owing to the big attraction", but at kick-off time Whitefield had not turned up; Linthouse therefore kicked a goal and claimed the tie. The two sides did play the tie properly the following week, with Linthouse winning 5–2.

The club fell seven points short of retaining its title in 1892–93, and applied to join the Scottish League, but the club's application was not even considered for a vote. After the 1893–94 season, the club applied again, this time mustering 7 votes, well short of the required threshold.

For 1894–95 the club only played Cup matches, the Alliance having fallen apart with member clubs leaving for the League during the Alliance's brief run. At the season's close, the Linties applied a third time for League membership, and this time was successful, gaining a maximum 24 votes.

=== Scottish League members ===
The club's 1895–96 League season was not a successful one, with the club finishing bottom of the ten-club division. The club nearly lost its League place at the end of the season. Wishaw Thistle, which had successfully retained the Scottish Football Combination, applied to join the League, and in the election voting, Linthouse and Wishaw tied for the third and final League place. On a run-off vote, Linthouse retained its place by 21 votes to 19.

One consolation that season was a record attendance of 10,000 for the Glasgow Cup game against Celtic in September 1895 (a 7–1 defeat).

The club spent five seasons in Division Two without much success, their highest finish being fifth in season 1897–98. Arguably their best achievements were in the Glasgow Cup, where they reached the semi-finals three times (in the 1891–92, 1896–97 and 1899–1900 seasons), losing to Rangers or Celtic each time. Even then, examination of their progress indicates they had fortunate draws against obscure teams on those occasions, while typically losing to the better-known opponents. The main exception to this was a 3–1 win in October 1896 over Partick Thistle who were something of a local rival, the clubs being based about a mile apart in competing burghs on opposite banks of the River Clyde, meeting frequently in the Alliance and SFL Division Two, and occasionally in the Scottish Qualifying Cup.

In 1899–1900 the club finished bottom of the division, and was struggling with low attendances in the shadow of Rangers; the club's Glasgow Cup semi-final with Celtic could only attract 5,000 fans, while Rangers could attract 40,000 against the same opponents. Part of the blame was also put on new Junior clubs offering better entertainment and taking fans from the smaller clubs, Linthouse being specifically named as one of the clubs that had been "killed" by the rise of Junior football. At the end of the season, Linthouse decided not to seek re-election to the league.

=== End of the club ===
Despite rumours in August that the club had closed shop, Linthouse entered the Scottish Cup and Glasgow Cup for 1900–01, with the intent of running on purely amateur lines. The club even progressed to the second preliminary round of the Scottish as first round opponents Clydebank forfeited the tie. However Linthouse in turn forfeited its second round tie with Motherwell, as well as its first round Glasgow Cup tie, and the football side was discontinued.

== Colours ==
The club mostly played in all navy blue, other than in 1886–87 when its shirts were black and white vertical stripes with blue knickers.

== Grounds ==
The club originally played at Langlands Park on the southern edge of Govan. In 1894, the club moved to Govandale Park in the centre of town.

== Honours ==
Scottish Alliance

- Champions: 1891–92

Govan Jubilee Cup

- Winners: 1888–89

Govan & Ibrox Cup

- Winners: 1887–88, 1888–89, 1889–90, 1890–91

== Notable players ==
One Linthouse player was capped; William Bowie, in March 1891.

== See also ==
Category:Linthouse F.C. players
