= 1900–01 Queens Park Rangers F.C. season =

English football club season

Queens Park Rangers
1900–01 season
- Manager: Jock Campbell (Trainer)
- Stadium: Kensal Rise Athletic Stadium
- Southern League Division One: 7th
- FA Cup: 5th Qualifying round
- Western Football League Division One: 4th
- Top goalscorer: League: Tommy Downing, Percy Humphreys 9 All: Percy Humphreys 12
- Highest home attendance: 8,000 (15 December 1900) Vs Bristol R
- Lowest home attendance: 3,000 (24 November 1900) Vs Chatham
- Biggest win: 7–1 (8 September 1900) Vs Swindon
- Biggest defeat: 1–5 (2 March 1901) Vs Southampton
Home colours	Away colours

The 1900–01 Queens Park Rangers season was the club's 13th season of existence and their 2nd season in the Southern League Division One, the top non-league division of football in England at the time. QPR also competed in the Western Football League.

== Season summary ==
In the 1900–01 season QPR continued play in the Southern League Division One and finished 8th. Whilst in the Western League, QPR finished 4th.

=== Southern League Division One ===
Pos	Team	Pld	W	D	L	GF	GA	GR	Pts
5	Tottenham Hotspur	28	16	4	8	55	33	1.667	36
6	West Ham United	28	14	5	9	40	28	1.429	33
7	Bristol Rovers	28	14	4	10	46	35	1.314	32
8	Queens Park Rangers	28	11	4	13	43	48	0.896	26
9	Reading	28	8	8	12	24	25	0.960	24

=== Results ===
QPR scores given first

Win Draw Loss

=== Southern League Division One ===
Date	Venue	Opponent	Result	Score F–A	Scorers	Attendance	League Position
1 September 1900	A	Bristol R	L	1–2	Downing	3,000	13
8 September 1900	H	Swindon	W	7–1	Gray 2, Downing 3, Humphreys, Hitch	4,000	6
15 September 1900	A	Reading	L	0–3		4,000	11
22 September 1900	H	Watford	W	1–0	Goldie	5,000	7
29 September 1900	A	Kettering T	L	1–2	Downing	3,000	10
6 October 1900	H	Luton	L	1–3	Humphreys	4,000	12
13 October 1900	A	Gravesend U	D	2–2	Gray, Downing	3,000	9
20 October 1900	H	Tottenham	W	2–1	Gray, Humphreys	5,000	9
27 October 1900	H	Millwall Athletic	L	0–2		5,000	10
10 November 1900	H	Southampton	L	0–1		9,000	11
24 November 1900	H	Chatham	Null	3–0	Foxall, Ronaldson 2	3,000	8
1 December 1900	A	New Brompton	L	1–2	Ronaldson	2,000	11
15 December 1900	H	Bristol R	W	4–3	Hitch (pen), Ronaldson, Humphreys, Downing	8,000	9
22 December 1900	A	Swindon	L	2–4	Humphreys, Keech	4,000	12
29 December 1900	H	Reading	D	0–0		5,000	11
5 January 1901	A	Watford	W	1–0	Skinner	2,000	9
12 January 1901	H	Kettering T	W	2–0	Foxall, Humphreys	4,000	7
19 January 1901	A	Luton	D	2–2	Gray, Humphreys	3,000	8
26 January 1901	H	New Brompton	W	2–0	Christie, Humphreys	3,000	7
9 February 1901	A	Bristol C	L	0–2		5,000	8
16 February 1901	A	Millwall Athletic	W	1–0	Gray	7,000	8
23 February 1901	H	West Ham	L	0–2		6,000	8
2 March 1901	A	Southampton	L	1–5	Gray	4,000	8
9 March 1901	H	Portsmouth	W	3–2	Ronaldson 2, Gray	5,000	8
16 March 1901	H	Gravesend U	W	4–2	Foxall, Humphreys, Hitch, Ronaldson	5,000	8
23 March 1901	H	Bristol C	W	2–0	Ronaldson 2	5,000	7
30 March 1901	A	Tottenham	L	1–4	Downing	4,000	8
5 April 1901	A	West Ham	L	1–2	Downing	9,000	8
27 April 1901	A	Portsmouth	D	1–1	Ronaldson	3,000	8

== Western Football League Division One ==
Pos	Team	Pld	W	D	L	GF	GA	GR	Pts
1	Portsmouth	16	11	2	3	36	23	1.565	24
2	Millwall Athletic	16	9	5	2	33	14	2.357	23
3	Tottenham Hotspur	16	8	5	3	37	19	1.947	21
4	Queens Park Rangers	16	7	4	5	39	24	1.625	18

Date	Venue	Opponent	Result	Score F–A	Scorers	Attendance	League Position
5 December 1900	A	Portsmouth	L	1–4	Newbigging		7
19 December 1900	H	Portsmouth	W	3–2	Gray, Ronaldson, Humphreys	2,000	
25 December 1900	H	Millwall Athletic	L	0–1		6,000	7
2 January 1901	H	Swindon	W	3–1	Humphreys, Ronaldson, Hitch	1,500	5
18 February 1901	H	Bristol C	L	0–2		1,000	7
14 March 1901	A	Swindon	L	2–3	Ronaldson 2	200	7
18 March 1901	H	Tottenham	D	1–1	Gray	2,000	
20 March 1901	A	Reading	W	6–1	Downing 2, Shaw (og), Foxall, Ronaldson 2		6
27 March 1901	A	Southampton	L	0–1			7
6 April 1901	A	Bristol R	W	3–2	Gray, Foxall, Frankham (og)	2,500	7
8 April 1901	A	Millwall Athletic	D	1–1	Gray	5,000	6
9 April 1901	A	Bristol C	D	2–2	Hitch, Downing		6
13 April 1901	H	Bristol R	W	5–0	Gray, Humphreys 2, Downing, Ronaldson	3,000	5
15 April 1901	A	Tottenham	D	2–2	Humphreys, Burton (og)	1,200	4
20 April 1901	H	Southampton	W	6–1	Ronaldson 3, Downing, Humphreys 2	3,000	4
22 April 1901	H	Reading	W	4–1	Ronaldson 2, Humphreys 2		4

=== FA Cup ===
Round	Date	Venue	Opponent	Result	Score F–A	Scorers	Attendance
FACup Q3	3 November 1900	H	Fulham	W	7–0	Goldie 2, Foxall 2, Downing, Gray, Hitch	4,000
FACup Q4	17 November 1900	A	Watford	D	1–1	Gray	4,000
FACup Q4 Rep	21 November 1900	H	Watford	W	4–1	Humphreys 3, Newbigging	2,000
FACup Q5	8 December 1900	A	Luton	L	0–3		5,000

== Squad ==
Position	Nationality	Name	Southern League Appearances	Southern League Goals	FA Cup Appearances	FA Cup Goals	Western League Appearances	Western League Goals
GK	(England)	Harry Collins						
GK		Jack Leather						
GK	(Scotland)	Alex Newbigging	5		2	1	8	1
GK	(England)	Harry Clutterbuck	28		4		15	
DF	(England)	Jack White						
DF	(England)	George Newlands	22		4		8	
DF	(England)	John Bowman						
DF		John Cole	1					
DF		John Musselwhite						
DF		Stuart Lennox	10				7	
DF		Ernest Gray						
DF	(England)	Charlie Aston						
DF	(Scotland)	Alex McConnell	23		4		15	
DF	(England)	Bill Ponting	1					
MF		Albert Edwards						
MF	(England)	Alf Hitch	28	3	4	1	15	2
MF	(England)	Ben Freeman						
MF	(England)	Henry (Harry) Skinner	27	1	4		16	
MF	(England)	Bill Keech	14	1	3		4	
MF	(Scotland)	James Bellingham	15		2		15	
FW	(England)	Arthur King						
FW	(Scotland)	Jack Pryce						
FW	(England)	Ernest Handford					1	
FW		A. Burton						
FW	(Scotland)	David Christie	8	1			4	
FW	(England)	George Seeley						
FW	(Scotland)	Hugh McQueen						
FW	(Scotland)	William Goldie	5	1	4	2		
FW	(England)	Tommy Downing	18	9	2	1	12	5
FW	(England)	Abe Foxall	27	2	4	2	14	2
FW	(Scotland)	Duncan Ronaldson	18	8			16	12
FW	(England)	Percy Humphreys	27	9	4	3	13	9
FW	(Scotland)	Peter Turnbull	3					
FW	(England)	Tom Gray	28	8	4	2	13	5

== Transfers in ==
Name	from	Date	Fee
Gooding, J. *		cs1900	
Albert Edwards	Swindon	1900	
George Newlands	Vale of Clyde	19 September 1900	
Ernest Gray	New Brompton	29 September 1900	
Alex Newbigging	Lanark U	13 October 1900	
Stuart Lennox	Cambridge St.Mary's	30 October 1900	
Ben Freeman	Grays U	17 May 1901	
Arthur King	Gainsborough Trinity	21 May 1901	
George Seeley	New Brompton	28 May 1901	
Jack White	Grays U	28 May 1901	
Chisholm, George	Oswestry	30 May 1901	
Hugh McQueen	Derby	30 May 1901	
Charlie Aston	Aston Villa	4 June 1901	
Harry Collins	Burnley	24 June 1901	
John Bowman	Stoke	29 June 1901	
Jack Pryce	Sheffield W	29 June 1901	
Burton, A.		cs1901	
William (Bill) Keech	Irthlingborough	cs1901	
Billington, Frank		Apr1901	

== Transfers out ==
Name	from	Date	Fee	Date	To	Fee
Jones, T.	Dec1898			cs 00		
Henry Handford	cs1898			cs 00	Willesden Town	
Gaylard, Hugh *	Nov1898	Uxbridge		cs 00	Richmond Association	
Knowles, Joe	8 May 1899	South Shields		cs 00	Retired	
McKenzie, James P. *	cs1890			cs 00		
Haywood, Adam	4 May 1899	Woolwich Arsenal		cs 00	New Brompton	
Haxton, A.	28 October 1899	Gravesend U		cs 00		
Wallington, Edward *	Dec1891	Kensal		cs 00		
Hadwick, Edwin *	Oct1897	Ilford		cs 00		
White, Bill	2 November 1899	West Calder Swifts		Aug 00	West Calder Swifts	
Hannah, Jimmy	4 May 1899	Third Lanark		Aug 00	Dykehead	
Cowie, Andrew	14 July 1899	Manchester C		Sep 00	Lochee U	
Tennant, Bill	4 May 1899	Arthurlie		Sep 00	Third Lanark	
John Cole	28 May 1900	Gainsborough Trinity		Sep 00		
Peter Turnbull	2 May 1899	Millwall Athletic		Oct 00	Brentford	
Manning, William	23 May 1900	Cambridge St.Mary's		Oct 00	Cambridge St.Mary's	
Albert Edwards	1900	Swindon		01	Swindon	
Harry Clutterbuck	Small Heath	2 May 1899		1 May	Grimsby	
Alex McConnell	Woolwich Arsenal	4 May 1899		1 May	Grimsby	
Alf Hitch	Grays U	15 May 1899		1 May	Nottingham	
James Bellingham	Falkirk	1 June 1900		1 May	Grimsby	
Henry (Harry) Skinner	Uxbridge	Apr1899		1 May	Grimsby	
Tommy Downing	Grays U	1 June 1900		1 May	Small Heath	
Tom Gray	New Brompton	15 May 1900		1 May	Bury	
Percy Humphreys	Cambridge St.Mary's	23 May 1900		1 May	Notts County	
Abe Foxall	Liverpool	20 June 1900		1 May	Woolwich Arsenal	
Duncan Ronaldson	Vale of Clyde	17 November 1900		1 May	Grimsby	
Alex Newbigging	Lanark U	13 October 1900		1 June	Nottingham	
Walborn, William R. *		Nov1896		cs 01		
Bill Ponting	Ryde Sports	16 July 1900		cs 01	Shepherd's Bush	
Gooding, J. *		cs1900		cs 01		
