= 1901–02 Queens Park Rangers F.C. season =

English football club season

Queens Park Rangers
1901–02 season
- Manager: Waters (Trainer)
- Stadium: Latimer Road
- Southern League Division One: 12th
- FA Cup: 5th Qualifying round
- Western Football League Division One: 8th
- Top goalscorer: League: Hugh McQueen 9 All: Harry Millar 12
- Highest home attendance: 12,000 (28 December 1901) Vs Tottenham
- Lowest home attendance: 2,000 (25 January 1901) Vs Brentford
- Biggest win: 5–1 (29 March 1901) Vs Northampton
- Biggest defeat: 1–7 (12 March 1901) vs Reading
Home colours	Away colours

The 1901–02 Queens Park Rangers season was the club's 14th season of existence and their 3rd season in the Southern League Division One, the top non-league division of football in England at the time. Qpr also competed in the Western Football League. and completed their 3rd season in the London League Premier Division

== Season summary ==
In the 1901–02 season QPR continued play in the Southern League Division One and Finished 13th whilst in the Western league, Qpr finished 8th.

=== Southern League Division One ===
Pos	Team	Pld	W	D	L	GF	GA	GR	Pts	Qualification
10	New Brompton	30	10	7	13	39	38	1.026	27	
11	Northampton Town	30	11	5	14	53	65	0.815	27	
12	Queens Park Rangers	30	9	6	15	34	55	0.618	24	
13	Watford	30	9	4	17	36	58	0.621	22	
14	Wellingborough	30	9	3	18	34	72	0.472	21	
15	Brentford	30	7	6	17	34	61	0.557	20	Relegation test matches

=== Results ===
QPR scores given first

Win Draw Loss

=== Southern League Division One ===
Date	Venue	Opponent	Result	Score F–A	Scorers	Attendance	League Position
7 September 1901	H	Watford	L	0–1		5,000	13
14 September 1901	A	Tottenham	L	0–2		10,000	15
28 September 1901	A	Portsmouth	L	0–1		7,000	16
5 October 1901	H	Swindon	W	4–0	Pryce, Millar, Stewart, McQueen	3,000	12
12 October 1901	A	Brentford	D	1–1	Millar	3,000	12
19 October 1901	H	Kettering T	W	2–1	McQueen, Seeley	5,000	11
26 October 1901	A	Luton	L	0–1		5,000	12
9 November 1901	H	West Ham	W	2–1	McQueen, Pryce	4,000	10
23 November 1901	H	Southampton	L	0–1		6,000	11
7 December 1901	H	New Brompton	D	1–1	McQueen	2,300	9
21 December 1901	A	Watford	D	1–1	Millar	2,300	11
28 December 1901	H	Tottenham	L	0–3		12,000	11
4 January 1901	A	Wellingborough	L	0–1		1,500	12
11 January 1901	H	Portsmouth	D	1–1	Stewart	5,000	12
18 January 1901	A	Swindon	W	3–0	Aston (pen), King, Wheldon	4,000	11
25 January 1901	H	Brentford	W	3–2	Newlands, Wheldon, Stewart	2,000	10
1 February 1901	A	Kettering T	L	0–3		4,000	10
8 February 1901	H	Luton	D	2–2	King, Wheldon	3,000	10
15 February 1901	H	Millwall Athletic	L	0–2		4,000	11
22 February 1901	A	West Ham	L	0–4		4,000	12
1 March 1901	H	Reading	W	1–0	McQueen	3,000	10
8 March 1901	A	Southampton	L	2–4	Wheldon, McQueen (pen)	2,000	13
12 March 1901	A	Reading	L	1–7	Millar	5,000	13
15 March 1901	H	Bristol R	D	0–0		3,000	13
20 March 1901	A	Northampton	L	1–4	Millar	3,000	13
22 March 1901	A	New Brompton	W	1–0	McQueen	3,000	12
29 March 1901	H	Northampton	W	5–1	Millar, Wheldon 2, McQueen 2	4,000	11
12 April 1901	A	Millwall Athletic	L	1–6	Millar	4,500	12
19 April 1901	H	Wellingborough	D	1–1	Seeley	4,000	12
30 April 1901	A	Bristol R	L	1–4	Edwards	3,000	12

== Western Football League Division One ==
Pos	Team	Pld	W	D	L	GF	GA	GR	Pts	Result
1	Portsmouth	16	13	1	2	53	16	3.313	27	
2	Tottenham Hotspur	16	11	3	2	42	17	2.471	25	
3	Reading	16	7	3	6	29	22	1.318	17	
4	Millwall Athletic	16	8	1	7	25	29	0.862	17	
5	Bristol Rovers	16	8	0	8	25	31	0.806	16	
6	Southampton	16	7	1	8	30	28	1.071	15	
7	West Ham United	16	6	2	8	30	20	1.500	14	
8	Queens Park Rangers	16	5	1	10	17	43	0.395	11	
9	Swindon Town	16	0	2	14	8	53	0.151	2	Left league at end of season

Date	Venue	Opponent	Result	Score F–A	Scorers	Attendance	League Position
9 September 1901	A	Bristol R	L	0–4			
16 September 1901	H	West Ham	L	1–4	Millar	1,000	
25 September 1901	A	Swindon	D	1–1	Pryce		
30 September 1901	H	Tottenham	L	1–3	Pryce	5,000	7
7 October 1901	H	Southampton	L	2–3	Millar, McQueen (pen)	2,000	7
16 October 1901	A	Southampton	L	1–5	Stewart		8
28 October 1901	H	Portsmouth	W	2–1	King, McQueen	4,000	8
4 November 1901	H	Bristol R	Null				
9 December 1901	A	Tottenham	L	2–3	Aston (pen), Pryce	2,500	8
25 December 1901	H	Millwall Athletic	L	0–2		3,000	8
26 December 1901	A	Reading	L	0–5		4,000	8
20 January 1902	A	West Ham	W	1–0	King	1,200	8
10 March 1902	H	Swindon	W	4–2	Pryce, Millar 2, Keech B.		8
28 March 1902	H	Reading	W	1–0	Bowman	3,000	8
31 March 1902	A	Millwall Athletic	L	0–5		6,000	8
9 April 1902	A	Portsmouth	L	0–5		2,000	8
26 April 1902	H	Bristol R	W	1–0	Millar	3,000	8

== London League Premier Division ==
Pos	Team	Pld	W	D	L	GF	GA	Pts
1	West Ham	8	5	1	2	18	9	11
2	Tottenham	8	3	3	2	15	13	9
3	Millwall Athletic	8	2	4	2	9	13	8
4	Queens Park Rangers	8	2	2	4	11	14	6
5	Woolwich Arsenal	8	2	2	4	9	13	6

Date	Venue	Opponent	Result	Score F–A	Scorers	Attendance	League Position
2 December 1901	H	Millwall Athletic	D	0–0		1,000	
1 January 1902	A	West Ham	L	1–2	King		
3 February 1902	H	Woolwich Arsenal	D	2–2	Stewart, Wheldon	500	
10 February 1902	A	Tottenham	W	5–1	Wheldon, Stewart, McQueen, Millar, King	1,200	
17 February 1902	A	Woolwich Arsenal	L	0–3		1,000	
17 March 1902	A	Millwall Athletic	L	0–3		600	
1 April 1902	H	West Ham	W	2–1	McQueen, King		
14 April 1902	H	Tottenham	L	1–2	McQueen	1,800	4

=== Southern Professional Charity Cup ===
Round	Date	Venue	Opponent	Result	Score F–A	Scorers	Attendance
SCC 1	19 April 1902	A	Reading	L	0–4		

=== FA Cup ===
Round	Date	Venue	Opponent	Result	Score F–A	Scorers	Attendance
FACup Q3	2 November 1901	H	Crouch End Vampires (London League)	W	2–0	Stewart, Millar	1,500
FACup Q4	16 November 1901	H	West Norwood	Null abandoned	1–0	Pryce	2,000
FACup Q4 Rep	20 November 1901	H	West Norwood	W	4–0	Millar 4	3,000
FACup Q5	30 November 1901	A	Luton	L	0–2		5,000

== Squad ==
Position	Nationality	Name	Southern League Appearances	Southern League Goals	FA Cup Appearances	FA Cup Goals	Western League Appearances	Western League Goals	London League Premier Appearances	London League Premier Goals
GK	(England)	Harry Collins	30		3		14		7	
GK		Jack Leather					2		1	
DF	(England)	Jack White	26		1		16		8	
DF	(England)	George Newlands	25	1	3		10		6	
DF	(England)	John Bowman	20		3		11	1	6	
DF		John Musselwhite					1		1	
DF		Jack Edwards								
DF		Stuart Lennox	1				1			
DF		Ernest Gray					1		1	
DF	(England)	Charlie Aston	25	1	3		13	1	6	
MF		Albert Edwards	10	1			8		3	
MF	(England)	Alf Hitch								
MF	(Scotland)	John Hamilton								
MF	(England)	Ben Freeman	29		3		14		7	
MF	(England)	William Clipsham								
MF	(England)	Henry (Harry) Skinner								
MF	(England)	Bill Keech	15		3		8		3	
FW	(Scotland)	John Stewart	23	3	3	1	9	1	5	2
FW	(England)	Tommy Wilson								
FW		Tommy Mays								
FW	(England)	Harry Abbott								
FW	(England)	Arthur King	15	2			9	2	7	3
FW	(England)	Walter Busby								
FW	(Scotland)	Bobby Colvin								
FW	(Scotland)	Jack Pryce	15	2	3	1	13	4	4	
FW	(England)	Ben Keech	1				1	1		
FW	(England)	Ernest Handford	3							
FW	(Scotland)	Robert McKinlay	4				1			
FW		Frank Jordan	2				1		6	2
FW		A. Burton					1			
FW	(Scotland)	David Christie	2				2			
FW	(England)	Fred Wheldon	14	6			5		6	2
FW	(England)	George Seeley	19	2	3		9		6	
FW	(Scotland)	Hugh McQueen	26	9	3		11	2	6	3
FW	(Scotland)	Harry Millar	24	7	3	5	15	5	5	1
FW	(Wales)	Roger Evans	1							

== Transfers in ==
Name	from	Date	Fee
Burton, A.		cs1901	
Ben Keech	Irthlingborough	cs1901	
Billington, Frank		Apr1901	
Ben Freeman	Grays U	17 May 1901	
Arthur King	Gainsborough Trinity	21 May 1901	
George Seeley	New Brompton	28 May 1901	
Jack White	Grays U	28 May 1901	
Chisholm, George	Oswestry	30 May 1901	
Hugh McQueen	Derby	30 May 1901	
Charlie Aston	Aston Villa	4 June 1901	
Harry Collins	Burnley	24 June 1901	
John Bowman	Stoke	29 June 1901	
Jack Pryce	Sheffield W	29 June 1901	
Albert Edwards	Manchester C	6 July 1901	
Harry Millar	Sheffield W	11 July 1901	
Ball, G.		Sep1901	
John Stewart	Third Lanark	5 Oct 1901	
Robert McKinlay	Vale of Clyde	24 Oct 1901	
Moorhead, Robert *	Bromley	Dec1901	
Fred Wheldon	West Bromwich	6 Dec 1901	£400
Roger Evans	Clapton	Mar1902	Loan
Alf Hitch	Nottingham	5 May 1902	
Walter Busby	Wellingborough	3 May 1902	
William Clipsham	Wandsworth	5 May 1902	
Bobby Colvin	Luton	7 May 1902	
Tommy Wilson	Aston Villa	12 May 1902	
John Hamilton	Millwall Athletic	14 May 1902	
Harry Abbott	Blackburn	14 May 1902	
Jack Edwards	Grays U	17 May 1902	
Tommy Mays	Grays U	23 May 1902	
Henry (Harry) Skinner	Grimsby	9 June 1902	

== Transfers out ==
Name	from	Date	Fee	Date	To	Fee
Walborn, William R. *		Nov1896		cs 1901		
Ponting, Bill *	Ryde Sports	16 July 1900		cs 1901	Shepherd's Bush	
Gooding, J. *		cs1900		cs 1901		
Clutterbuck, Harry	Small Heath	2 May 1899		May 1901	Grimsby	
McConnell, Alex	Woolwich Arsenal	4 May 1899		May 1901	Grimsby	
Alf Hitch	Grays U	15 May 1899		May 1901	Nottingham	
Bellingham, James	Falkirk	1 June 1900		May 1901	Grimsby	
Henry (Harry) Skinner	Uxbridge	Apr1899		May 1901	Grimsby	
Downing, Tommy	Grays U	1 June 1900		May 1901	Small Heath	
Gray, Tom	New Brompton	15 May 1900		May 1901	Bury	
Humphreys, Percy	Cambridge St.Mary's	23 May 1900		May 1901	Notts County	
Foxall, Abe	Liverpool	20 June 1900		May 1901	Woolwich Arsenal	
Ronaldson, Duncan	Vale of Clyde	17 Nov 1900		May 1901	Grimsby	
Newbigging, Alex	Lanark U	13 Oct 1900		June 1901	Nottingham	
Goldie, William	Stevenston Thistle	24 Aug 1900		August 1901	Kilwinning Eglinton	
Jordan, Harry *	Watford	Oct1898		October 1901	Watford	
Stuart Lennox	Cambridge St.Mary's	30 Oct 1900		October 1901		
Burton, A.		cs1901		October 1901		
Ball, G.		Sep1901		December 1901		
Roger Evans	Clapton	Mar1902	Loan	March 1902	Clapton	Loan
William (Bill) Keech	Loughborough	13 May 1899		May 1902	Brentford	
David Christie	Ryde Sports	20 June 1900		May 1902		
Billington, Frank		Apr1901		May 1902		
John Stewart	Third Lanark	5 Oct 1901		May 1902	Hibernian	
Fred Wheldon	West Bromwich	6 Dec 1901	£400	May 1902	Portsmouth	
Hugh McQueen	Derby	30 May 1901		June 1902	Gainsborough Trinity	
Ernest Gray	New Brompton	29 Sep 1900		cs 1902		
Ball, G.		Sep 1901		cs 1902		
Moorhead, Robert *	Bromley	Dec 1901		cs 1902	Wandsworth	
Robert McKinlay	Vale of Clyde	24 Oct 1901		cs 1902		
Chisholm, George	Oswestry	30 May 1901		cs 1902		
