= 1902–03 Queens Park Rangers F.C. season =

English football club season

Queens Park Rangers
1902–03 season
- Manager: Charles Miles
- Stadium: Kensal Rise Athletic Stadium
- Southern League Division One: 9th
- FA Cup: QR3
- Western Football League Division One: 7th
- London League Premier Division: 5th
- Top goalscorer: League: All: John Blackwood 9
- Highest home attendance: 10,000 (21 February 1903) Vs Southampton F.C.
- Biggest win: 4–2 (11 October 1902) Vs Kettering T
- Biggest defeat: 0–6 (4 April 1903) Vs Millwall Athletic
Home colours	Away colours

The 1902–03 Queens Park Rangers season was the club's 15th season of existence and their 4th season in the Southern League Division One, the top non-league division of football in England at the time. QPR also competed in the Western Football League. and completed their fourth season in the London League Premier Division

== Season summary ==
In the 1902–03 season QPR continued play in the Southern League Division One and Finished 9th whilst in the Western league, Qpr finished 7th.

=== Southern League Division One ===
Pos	Team	Pld	W	D	L	GF	GA	GR	Pts
7	Millwall Athletic	30	14	3	13	52	37	1.405	31
8	Northampton Town	30	12	6	12	39	48	0.813	30
9	Queens Park Rangers	30	11	6	13	34	42	0.810	28
10	West Ham United	30	9	10	11	35	49	0.714	28
11	Luton Town	30	10	7	13	43	44	0.977	27

=== Results ===
QPR scores given first

Win Draw Loss

=== Southern League Division One ===
Date	Venue	Opponent	Result	Score F–A	Scorers	Attendance	League Position
3 September 1902	H	Wellingborough	W	2–0	Busby 2	5,000	1
6 September 1902	A	Tottenham Hotspur F.C.	D	0–0		13,000	1
13 September 1902	H	West Ham United F.C.	D	0–0		7,000	1
20 September 1902	A	Portsmouth F.C.	L	1–2	Hitch	10,000	3
27 September 1902	H	New Brompton	L	1–2	Wilson	6,000	6
4 October 1902	A	Swindon	L	0–2		4,000	13
11 October 1902	H	Kettering T	W	4–2	Wilson, Hitch, Busby, Colvin	5,000	8
18 October 1902	A	Luton Town F.C.	L	1–4	Edwards, J.	4,000	9
25 October 1902	H	Reading	L	1–3	Hamilton	7,000	13
1 November 1902	H	Luton Town F.C.	L	0–3		8,000	
8 November 1902	A	Southampton F.C.	L	0–2		4,000	14
22 November 1902	A	Bristol R	L	0–4		5,000	15
29 November 1902	H	Northampton	D	0–0		4,000	15
6 December 1902	A	Watford	W	2–0	Brown 2	4,000	10
20 December 1902	H	Tottenham Hotspur F.C.	L	0–4		7,000	13
27 December 1902	A	West Ham United F.C.	L	0–2		2,500	14
3 January 1903	H	Portsmouth F.C.	W	4–3	Hitch, Blackwood 2, Brown	6,000	14
10 January 1903	A	New Brompton	D	0–0		3,000	13
17 January 1903	H	Swindon	W	2–0	Brown 2	4,000	11
24 January 1903	A	Kettering T	W	1–0	Busby	5,000	10
31 January 1903	H	Luton	W	3–1	Abbott 2, Hamilton	5,000	10
14 February 1903	H	Millwall Athletic	L	0–1		7,000	10
21 February 1903	H	Southampton F.C.	D	0–0		10,000	10
4 March 1903	H	Brentford F.C.	W	3–0	Blackwood 2, Freeman	5,000	10
7 March 1903	H	Bristol R	W	2–0	Blackwood, Young (og)	4,000	9
21 March 1903	H	Watford	W	3–0	Brown 2, Blackwood	4,000	6
28 March 1903	A	Brentford F.C.	W	2–0	Blackwood 2	4,000	6
31 March 1903	A	Northampton	D	1–1	Brown	3,000	6
4 April 1903	A	Millwall Athletic	L	0–6		2,000	7
14 April 1903	A	Wellingborough Town F.C.	L	1–2	Blackwood	2,000	9
18 April 1903	A	Reading	L	0–1		4,000	9

== Western Football League Division One ==
Pos	Team	Pld	W	D	L	GF	GA	GR	Pts
4	Tottenham Hotspur	16	6	7	3	20	14	1.429	19
5	Millwall Athletic	16	6	3	7	23	29	0.793	15
6	Reading	16	7	0	9	20	21	0.952	14
7	Queens Park Rangers	16	6	2	8	18	31	0.581	14
8	Brentford	16	3	4	9	16	34	0.471	10
9	West Ham United	16	2	4	10	15	29	0.517	8

Date	Venue	Opponent	Result	Score F–A	Scorers	Attendance	League Position
22 September 1902	H	Tottenham	L	0–1		4,000	
6 October 1902	H	Southampton	D	0–0	Abbott, Colvin (pen)	2,000	
13 October 1902	A	West Ham	L	0–0		2,000	
20 October 1902	H	Portsmouth	L	0–2		3,000	8
3 November 1902	A	Tottenham	L	0–2		2,000	9
10 November 1902	A	Millwall Athletic	L	0–2		1,500	9
25 December 1902	H	Brentford	W	5–0	Blackwood 2, Brown 2, Abbott, White	6,000	8
26 December 1902	A	Reading	W	0–0	Hamilton	6,000	8
19 January 1903	A	Southampton	L	0–2		1,000	8
2 February 1903	H	Millwall Athletic	W	1–0	Abbott, Busby	2,000	
9 February 1903	H	West Ham	W	1–0	Brown, Abbott	3,000	7
11 March 1903	A	Portsmouth	L	0–1		3,000	8
10 April 1903	H	Reading	W	1–0	Wilson, Bowman, Brown	4,000	
11 April 1903	H	Bristol R	W	1–0	Brown	4,000	6
13 April 1903	A	Brentford	D	0–0		4,000	
25 April 1903	A	Bristol R	L	0–2	Hamilton	2,000	7

== London League Premier Division ==
Pos	Team	Pld	W	D	L	GF	GA	Pts
1	Tottenham	10	7	1	2	19	4	15
2	West Ham	10	5	3	2	15	13	13
3	Woolwich Arsenal	10	6	0	4	14	10	12
4	Millwall Athletic	10	3	4	3	18	14	10
5	Queens Park Rangers	10	2	3	5	9	15	7
6	Brentford	10	1	1	8	9	28	3

Date	Venue	Opponent	Result	Score F–A	Scorers	Attendance	League Position
8 September 1902	A	Millwall Athletic	D	0–1	Hamilton	2,000	
15 September 1902	A	Woolwich Arsenal	L	0–3	King	800	
29 September 1902	H	Millwall Athletic	D	0–0	Abbott	2,000	
27 October 1902	H	Woolwich Arsenal	L	0–1		2,000	
17 November 1902	H	West Ham	L	0–1		1,500	5
5 January 1903	A	Brentford	D	0–1	Abbott 2	1,500	5
26 January 1903	A	West Ham	L	0–0		1,000	5
16 March 1903	H	Tottenham	W	1–0	Abbott (pen)	3,000	5
30 March 1903	A	Tottenham	L	0–1		2,500	5
20 April 1903	H	Brentford	W	2–0	Janes, Blackwood, White	1,000	5

=== Southern Professional Charity Cup ===
Round	Date	Venue	Opponent	Result	Score F–A	Scorers	Attendance
SCC 1	3 December 1902	A	Portsmouth F.C.	L	2–4	Hamilton, Blackwood	2,000

=== FA Cup ===
Round	Date	Venue	Opponent	Result	Score F–A	Scorers	Attendance
FACup Q3	1 November 1902	H	Luton Town F.C.	L	0–3		8,000

=== Friendlies ===
Date	Venue	Opponent	Result	Score F–A	Scorers	Attendance
8 October 1902	H	Eastbourne	L	2–1	Jones, Hamilton	

== Squad ==
Position	Nationality	Name	Southern League Appearances	Southern League Goals	FA Cup Appearances	FA Cup Goals	Western League Appearances	Western League Goals	London League Premier Appearances	London League Premier Goals
GK	(England)	Harry Collins	30		1		14		10	
GK		Jack Leather					2		1	
DF	(England)	Jack White	17		1		13	1	6	1
DF	(England)	George Newlands	26				12		9	
DF	(England)	Frank Lyon								
DF	(England)	Arthur Archer								
DF	(England)	John Bowman	27		1		11	1	8	
DF		John Musselwhite	1				2		2	
DF	(England)	John Rance								
MF	(England)	Sam Downing								
MF		Albert Edwards	4				2		2	
MF	(England)	Alf Hitch	26	3			13		8	
MF		George (Paddy) Milward								
MF	(Scotland)	John Hamilton	28	2	1		16	2	8	1
MF	(England)	Ben Freeman	20	1			13		7	
MF	(England)	Albert Bull								
MF		Bill Banner								
MF		J Prater					3			
MF	(England)	William Clipsham	2		1		1			
FW	(Scotland)	John Stewart								
FW	(Scotland)	Billy Cross								
FW	(Scotland)	John Blackwood	15	9			7	2	3	1
FW	(England)	Tommy Wilson	29	2	1		15	1	9	
FW		Tommy Mays	1						1	
FW	(England)	Albert Brown	18	8			9	5	5	
FW	(England)	Harry Abbott	23	2	1		13	4	7	4
FW	(England)	Tommy McCairns								
DF		Jack Edwards	18	1	1		8		6	
FW	(England)	Arthur King	6		1		4		2	1
FW	(England)	Walter Busby	14	4	1		7	1	6	
FW		George Unwin					1			
FW	(England)	William Janes							3	1
FW	(Scotland)	Bobby Colvin	11	1			3	1	4	
MF	(England)	Henry (Harry) Skinner	9		1		5		2	
FW	(Scotland)	Jack Pryce	5				2		1	

== Transfers in ==
Name	from	Date	Fee
George Unwin	Cambridge St.Mary's	4 Sep 1902	
John Rance	Chesham Generals	5 Sep 1902	
William Janes	Grays U	18 Sep 1902	
Albert Brown	Southampton	24 Oct 1902	96
John Blackwood	Reading	21 Nov 1902	
Handford, Henry *	Willesden Town	Nov1902	
J Prater		Dec1902	
Wood		Apr1903	
Sam Downing	West Hampstead	Apr1903	
Albert Bull	Reading	2 May 1903	
Tommy McCairns	Wellingborough	3 May 1903	
George (Paddy) Milward	Chesterfield	5 May 1903	
Billy Cross	Third Lanark	5 May 1903	
Arthur Archer	New Brompton	5 May 1903	
Frank Lyon	Watford	5 May 1903	
Bill Banner	Chesterfield	8 May 1903	
Ward, Ernie	Clapton Orient	June1903	
Evans, Roger *	Clapton	June1903	
Smith, W.		cs1903	

== Transfers out ==
Name	from	Date	Fee	Date	To	Fee
Gray, Ernest	New Brompton	29 Sep 1900		cs 1902		
Ball, G.		Sep1901		cs 1902		
Moorhead, Robert *	Bromley	Dec1901		cs 1902	Wandsworth	
McKinlay, Robert	Vale of Clyde	24 Oct 1901		cs 1902		
Chisholm, George	Oswestry	30 May 1901		cs 1902		
Aston, Charlie	Aston Villa	4 June 1901		Aug 1902	Burton U	
Jordan, Frank *		Oct1898		Sep 1902		
Seeley, George	New Brompton	28 May 1901		Sep 1902	Southampton Wanderers	
Millar, Harry	Sheffield W	11 July 1901		Sep 1902	Kilbarchan	
Henry (Harry) Skinner	Grimsby	9 June 1902		Nov 1902		
Jack Edwards	Grays U	17 May 1902		Mar 1903	Essa	
Walter Busby	Wellingborough	3 May 1902		May 1903	Woolwich Arsenal	
Bobby Colvin	Luton	7 May 1902		May 1903	Swindon	
Arthur King	Gainsborough Trinity	21 May 1901		June 1903	Grays U	
Wood		Apr1903		cs 1903	Willesden Town	
Handford, Henry *	Willesden Town	Nov1902		cs 1903		
William Clipsham	Wandsworth	5 May 1902		cs 1903		
George Unwin	Cambridge St.Mary's	4 Sep 1902		cs 1903	Grantchester	
J Prater		Dec1902		cs 1903		
