= 1903–04 Queens Park Rangers F.C. season =

English football club season

Queens Park Rangers
1903–04 season
- Manager: Charles Miles
- Stadium: Kensal Rise Athletic Stadium
- Southern League Division One: 5th
- FA Cup: Q3
- Western Football League Division One: 6th
- London League Premier Division: 4th
- Top goalscorer: League: All: John Blackwood 18
- Highest home attendance: 15,000 (Oct 17 1903) Vs Southampton F.C.
- Lowest home attendance: 3,500 (Apr 9 1904) Vs Brighton & Hove Albion F.C.
- Biggest win: 6-1 (Dec 19 1903) vs Portsmouth F.C.
- Biggest defeat: 0-4 (Feb 27 1904) Vs Millwall F.C.
Home colours	Away colours

The 1903–04 Queens Park Rangers season was the club's 16th season of existence and their 5th season in the Southern League Division One, the top non-league division of football in England at the time. Qpr also competed in the 1904–05 Western Football League. and completed their 5th season in the London League Premier Division

== Season summary ==
In the 1903–04 season QPR continued play in the Southern League Division One and Finished 5th whilst in the Western league, Qpr finished 6th.

=== Southern League Division One ===
Pos	Team	Pld	W	D	L	GF	GA	GR	Pts
1	Southampton	34	22	6	6	75	30	2.500	50
2	Tottenham Hotspur	34	16	11	7	54	37	1.459	43
3	Bristol Rovers	34	17	8	9	64	42	1.524	42
4	Portsmouth	34	17	8	9	41	38	1.079	42
5	Queens Park Rangers	34	15	11	8	53	37	1.432	41

=== Results ===
QPR scores given first

Win Draw Loss

=== Southern League Division One ===
Date	Venue	Opponent	Result	Score F–A	Scorers	Attendance	League Position
Sep 5 1903	H	Brentford F.C.	W	1-0	Brown	10,000	4
Sep 12 1903	A	West Ham United F.C.	L	0-1		6,000	12
Sep 19 1903	H	Tottenham Hotspur F.C.	W	2-0	McGowan, Abbott	6,000	6
Sep 26 1903	A	Luton Town F.C.	L	0-1		6,000	10
Oct 3 1903	H	New Brompton	W	3-0	McGowan 2, Milward	7,000	7
Oct 10 1903	A	Kettering T	L	1-2	Milward	2,000	11
Oct 17 1903	H	Southampton F.C.	L	0-3		15,000	12
Oct 24 1903	A	Fulham F.C.	D	2-2	Murphy (pen), McGowan	16,000	11
Nov 7 1903	A	Swindon Town F.C.	D	1-1	Blackwood	8,000	11
Nov 14 1903	H	Northampton Town F.C.	W	4-1	Milward, Blackwood 3	5,000	9
Nov 21 1903	H	Reading F.C.	D	1-1	Blackwood	10,000	9
Nov 28 1903	A	Wellingborough Town F.C.	D	1-1	Murphy	4,000	8
Dec 5 1903	H	Bristol Rovers F.C.	W	2-1	Blackwood, Hamilton	5,000	8
Dec 12 1903	A	Brighton & Hove Albion F.C.	W	3-1	Blackwood, Milward 2	5,000	8
Dec 19 1903	H	Portsmouth F.C.	W	6-1	Hitch, Blackwood 3, Murphy 2	8,000	6
Dec 28 1903	A	Northampton Town F.C.	L	1-2	Wilson	3,000	8
Jan 2 1904	A	Brentford F.C.	W	4-1	Murphy (pen), Milward 2, Blackwood	5,000	7
Jan 9 1904	H	West Ham United F.C.	W	2-1	Murphy, Milward	6,000	7
Jan 16 1904	A	Tottenham Hotspur F.C.	D	2-2	Blackwood 2	12,000	6
Jan 30 1904	A	New Brompton	L	0-2		1,000	6
Feb 6 1904	H	Kettering T	W	2-0	Murphy, Blackwood	4,000	5
Feb 13 1904	A	Southampton F.C.	L	1-2	Blackwood	7,000	6
Feb 20 1904	H	Fulham F.C.	D	1-1	Cross	12,000	6
Feb 27 1904	A	Millwall F.C.	L	0-4		8,000	7
Mar 5 1904	H	Swindon Town F.C.	W	1-0	Blackwood	5,000	7
Mar 12 1904	H	Plymouth Argyle F.C.	W	1-0	Abbott	6,000	6
Mar 17 1904	H	Luton Town F.C.	W	2-1	Milward, Brown (pen)	4,000	6
Mar 19 1904	A	Reading F.C.	D	1-1	Blackwood	5,000	4
Mar 26 1904	H	Wellingborough Town F.C.	W	3-0	Bowman, Milward, Blackwood	10,000	5
Apr 2 1904	A	Bristol Rovers F.C.	D	1-1	Cross	7,000	5
Apr 9 1904	H	Brighton & Hove Albion F.C.	D	1-1	Milward	3,500	5
Apr 13 1904	A	Plymouth Argyle F.C.	D	1-1	Brown	6,000	6
Apr 16 1904	A	Portsmouth F.C.	D	0-0		6,000	5
Apr 30 1904	H	Millwall F.C.	W	2-1	Murphy, Skilton	7,000	5

== Western Football League Division One ==
Pos	Team	Pld	W	D	L	GF	GA	GR	Pts
6	Queens Park Rangers	16	5	5	6	15	21	0.714	15
7	Reading	16	4	4	8	16	26	0.615	12
8	Bristol Rovers	16	4	3	9	29	29	1.000	11

Date	Venue	Opponent	Result	Score F–A	Scorers	Attendance	League Position
Sep 7 1903	A	Bristol R	W	2-1	Murphy, Milward		
Sep 14 1903	H	Plymouth	D	1-1	McGowan	3,000	
Sep 23 1903	A	Portsmouth	L	0-3		4,000	3
Oct 5 1903	A	Tottenham	L	0-3		6,000	
Oct 12 1903	H	Portsmouth	D	1-1	Blackwood	4,000	5
Oct 19 1903	A	Brentford	L	0-1		2,000	6
Nov 2 1903	A	Southampton	L	1-5	Milward		7
Nov 9 1903	H	Tottenham	W	2-0	Blackwood 2	3,000	
Nov 16 1903	H	West Ham *	Null	2-2	Blackwood, Fair (og)	2,000	4
Dec 26 1903	A	Reading	L	0-3		7,000	
Jan 18 1903	H	Southampton	D	0-0		1,000	7
Feb 24 1903	A	Plymouth	W	1-0	Mays	3,000	6
Feb 29 1903	H	Brentford	D	0-0		1,000	6
Apr 1 1903	H	Reading	D	0-0		9,000	
Apr 5 1903	H	Bristol R	W	3-0	Abbott, Brown, Hitch	2,000	
Apr 11 1903	H	West Ham	W	3-1	Bowman, Brown 2	1,000	5
Apr 14 1903	A	West Ham	L	1-2	Mays	600	6

== London League Premier Division ==
Pos	Team	Pld	W	D	L	GF	GA	Pts
1	Millwall	12	11	1	0	38	8	23
2	Tottenham	12	7	1	4	23	14	15
3	Woolwich Arsenal	12	6	2	4	24	19	14
4	Queens Park Rangers	12	5	2	5	18	23	12
5	Brentford	12	2	3	7	16	19	7
6	Fulham	12	3	1	8	10	29	7
7	West Ham	12	2	2	8	14	31	6

Date	Venue	Opponent	Result	Score F–A	Scorers	Attendance	League Position
Sep 1 1903	H	Fulham	W	2-0	Brown, Blackwood	8,000	2
Dec 25 1903	H	Millwall	L	0-2		10,000	
Jan 11 1903	A	Woolwich Arsenal	L	2-6	McGowan, White	3,000	
Feb 1 1903	H	West Ham	W	5-1	Brown 3, Milward, Cross	2,000	
Feb 15 1903	H	Tottenham	L	0-3		3,000	
Mar 7 1903	A	Tottenham	W	3-1	Brown, Abbott 2	2,000	
Mar 14 1903	A	Brentford	L	0-4		2,000	
Mar 21 1903	H	Woolwich Arsenal	W	3-1	Blackwood, Brown 2 (1 pen)		4
Mar 28 1903	A	West Ham	D	1-1	Mays	600	4
Apr 4 1903	A	Millwall	L	0-3		5,000	4
Apr 18 1903	H	Brentford	W	2-1	Edwards, Banner	2,000	4
Apr 25 1903	A	Fulham	D	0-0		1,000	4

=== Southern Professional Charity Cup ===
Round	Date	Venue	Opponent	Result	Score F–A	Scorers	Attendance
One	Sep 30 1903	A	Reading	L	0-1		3,000

=== FA Cup ===
Round	Date	Venue	Opponent	Result	Score F–A	Scorers	Attendance
FACup Q3	Oct 31 1903	H	Fulham (Southern League)	D	1-1	Murphy	12,000
FAC Q3 R	Nov 4 1903	A	Fulham (Southern League)	L	1-3	Brown	18,000

== Squad ==
Position	Nationality	Name	Southern League Appearances	Southern League Goals	FA Cup Appearances	FA Cup Goals	Western League Appearances	Western League Goals	London League Premier Appearances	London League Premier Goals
GK	(England)	Harry Collins	33		2		15		10	
GK		Jack Leather	1				1		2	
DF	(England)	Jack White	8				8		7	1
DF	(England)	George Newlands	32		2		2		9	
DF	(England)	Frank Lyon	2		2		3		1	
DF	(England)	Seeley Fox					1			
DF	(England)	Arthur Archer	31				12		8	
DF	(England)	John Bowman	29	1	2		11	1	9	
DF		John Musselwhite					2			
DF	(England)	John Rance					1			
MF	(England)	Sam Downing	20				9		6	
MF	(England)	George Ryder					1		1	
MF		Albert Edwards	3				3		3	1
MF	(England)	Alf Hitch	30	1	2		9	1	8	
MF		George (Paddy) Milward	30	11			6	2	8	1
MF	(Scotland)	John Hamilton	19	1	2		7		3	
MF	(England)	Ben Freeman	2				3		4	
MF	(England)	Albert Bull	13		2		7		6	
MF		Bill Banner	4				7		4	1
FW	(England)	Neil Murphy	22	8	1	1	11	1	5	1
FW	(England)	Fred Bevan								
FW	(Scotland)	John Stewart								
FW	(England)	Percy Skilton	1	1						
FW	(Scotland)	Billy Cross	13	2			9		5	1
FW	(Scotland)	Duncan Ronaldson								
FW	(England)	Harry Singleton								
FW	(Scotland)	John Blackwood	24	18			6	3	6	2
FW	(England)	Frank McGowan	7	4	2		5	1	4	1
FW	(England)	Tommy Wilson	30	1	2		10		8	
FW		Tommy Mays	3				5	2	4	1
FW	(England)	Albert Brown	12	3	1	1	7	3	7	7
FW	(England)	Harry Abbott	4	2			9	1	3	2
FW	(England)	Tommy McCairns	1		2					

== Transfers in ==
Name	from	Date	Fee
Smith, W.		cs1903	
Frank McGowan	Morpeth Harriers	July1903	
Neil Murphy	Sheffield U	Aug 4,1903	
George Ryder	Morpeth Harriers	Dec1903	
Potter, R.	Bowes Park Albion	Feb1904	
Scott		Apr1904	
Seeley Fox	Ealing	Apr1904	
Scott		Apr1904	
Percy Skilton	Harrow	Apr1904	
John Cross	Third Lanark	May 4, 1904	
Fred Bevan	Reading	May 1, 1904	
Duncan Ronaldson	Bury	May 3, 1904	
John Stewart	Hibernian	May 4, 1904	
Harry Singleton	New Brompton	May 4, 1904	

== Transfers out ==
Name	from	Date	Fee	Date	To	Fee
Wood		Apr1903		cs 03	Willesden Town	
Handford, Henry *	Willesden Town	Nov1902		cs 03		
Clipsham, William	Wandsworth	May 5, 1902		cs 03		
Unwin, George	Cambridge St.Mary's	Sep 4,1902		cs 03	Grantchester	
Prater, J.		Dec1902		cs 03		
Ward, Ernie	Clapton Orient	June1903		Aug 03	Clapton Orient	
Pryce, John (Jack)	Sheffield W	June 29, 1901		Oct 03	Brighton	
Keech, Ben	Irthlingborough	cs1901		Nov 03	Willesden Town	
Tommy McCairns	Wellingborough	May 3, 1903		Dec 03	Brighton	
Janes, William	Grays U	Sep 18,1902		Feb 04	Clapton Orient	
Scott		Apr1904		cs 04		
Harry Abbott	Blackburn	May 14, 1902		May 4	Bolton	
Albert Brown	Southampton	Oct 24,1902	£96	May 4	Preston	
Tommy Wilson	Aston Villa	May 12, 1902		May 4	Bolton	
