= 1894–95 Scottish Cup =

Tournament details
- Country: Scotland

Final positions
- Champions: St Bernard's
- Runners-up: Renton

The 1894–95 Scottish Cup was the 22nd season of Scotland's most prestigious football knockout competition. The Cup was won by St Bernard's when they beat Renton, 2–1, in the final.

== Calendar ==
Round	First match date	Fixtures	Clubs
First round	24 November 1894	16	32 → 16
Second round	15 December 1894	8	16 → 8
Quarter-finals	19 January 1895	4	8 → 4
Semi-finals	9 March 1895	2	4 → 2
Final	20 April 1895	1	2 → 1

== First round ==
Home team	Score	Away team
Abercorn	1 – 5	Leith Athletic *
Ayr Parkhouse	5 – 3	Polton Vale
Celtic	4 – 1	Queen's Park
Clyde	7 – 2	Stevenston Thistle
Dumbarton	2 – 1	Galston
Dundee	5 – 1	Orion
Hibernian	6 – 1	Forfar Athletic
Kilmarnock	5 – 1	East Stirlingshire
Lochee United	2 – 5	King's Park
Motherwell	1 – 2	Mossend Swifts
Raith Rovers	6 – 3	5th KRV *
Rangers	1 – 2	Heart of Midlothian
Slamannan Rovers	2 – 3	Renton *
St Bernard's	4 – 2	Airdrieonians
St Mirren	5 – 0	Battlefield *
Third Lanark	4 – 5	Annbank

- Match Declared Void

=== First round replay ===
Home team	Score	Away team
Abercorn	4 –1	Leith Athletic
5th KRV	4 – 3	Raith Rovers
Renton	4 –0	Slamannan Rovers
St Mirren	8 –1	Battlefield

== Second round ==
Home team	Score	Away team
Abercorn	1 –6	Heart of Midlothian
Ayr Parkhouse	3 – 1	Mossend Swifts
Clyde	4 – 2	Annbank
Dundee	2 – 0	St Mirren
Hibernian	2 – 0	Celtic *
King's Park	2 – 1	Dumbarton
Renton	6 – 0	5th KRV
St Bernard's	3 – 1	Kilmarnock

- Match Declared Void

=== Second round replay ===
Home team	Score	Away team
Hibernian	0 –2	Celtic

== Quarter-final ==
Home team	Score	Away team
Ayr Parkhouse	2 – 3	Renton
Clyde	2 – 6	St Bernard's
Dundee	1 – 0	Celtic
Heart of Midlothian	4 – 2	King's Park

=== Quarter-final replay ===
Home team	Score	Away team
Clyde	1 – 2	St Bernard's

== Semi-finals ==
Home team	Score	Away team
Dundee	1 – 2	Renton *
Heart of Midlothian	0 – 0	St Bernard's

- Match was played as a friendly due to difficult field conditions

=== Semi-final replay ===
Home team	Score	Away team
Dundee	3 – 3	Renton
Heart of Midlothian	0 – 1	St Bernard's

=== Semi-final second replay ===
Home team	Score	Away team
Renton	3 – 0	Dundee

== Final ==
20 April 1895

St Bernard's	2–1	Renton
Cleland		Gilfillan 44'

Ibrox Park, Govan
Attendance: 12,000

=== Teams ===
St. Bernard's:
GK	James Sneddon
RB	Bob Foyers
LB	Coombe Hall
RH	George Murdoch
CH	Tom Robertson
LH	Patrick McManus
OR	Robert Laing
IR	Daniel Paton
CF	Jimmy Oswald
IL	Bernard Crossan
OL	James Cleland

Renton:
GK	Matthew Dickie
RB	John L. Ritchie
LB	Archie McCall
RH	David Tait
CH	William McColl
LH	Robert Glen
OR	John McLean
IR	John Murray
CF	Jack Pryce
IL	David Gilfillan
OL	Robert Duncan

== See also ==
- 1894–95 in Scottish football
