= John Blackwood (footballer, born 1877) =

Scottish footballer

- Blackwood with Reading in 1902–03

Personal information
- Date of birth: 31 August 1877
- Place of birth: Glasgow, Scotland (Note: Other sources vary as to Blackwood's place of birth. Joyce, 2012, and Litster, 2012, have Maine, US, while 11v11.com has Burnley, England. The Portsmouth Evening News, on 21 December 1904, described him as "born in Scotland".)
- Date of death: 4 January 1913 (aged 35)
- Place of death: Glasgow, Scotland
- Position: Centre forward

Senior career*
Years	Team	Apps	(Gls)
?–1899	Petershill		
1899–1900	Celtic	1	(0)
1899–1900	→ Partick Thistle (loan)	8	(7)
1900–1901	Woolwich Arsenal	17	(6)
1901–1902	Reading	23	(6)
1902–1904	Queens Park Rangers	39	(27)
1904–1905	West Ham United	4	(1)
1905–?	Royal Albert		
- * Club domestic league appearances and goals

John Blackwood (31 August 1877 – 4 January 1913) was a Scottish footballer who played as a centre forward in the Scottish League for Celtic and Partick Thistle, in the Football League for Woolwich Arsenal, and in the Southern League for Reading, Queens Park Rangers and West Ham United.

== Career ==
Blackwood started his career with Petershill and joined Scottish First Division club Celtic on 23 September 1899. He and Willie McOustra were signed by the club after playing in a friendly against The Kaffirs, a touring team from the Orange Free State. After a single appearance, he was loaned to Partick Thistle of the Second Division the following month. He made his debut for Thistle in November, replacing Willie Paul in the forward line in a 2–0 win over Airdrieonians, and scored his first goals later in the month, against Morton. In December, he scored twice, the first in the opening minute, in an 8–1 win against Linthouse. He continued to score goals for Thistle into the new year, with eight goals in two friendlies against Clachnacuddin and Orion, and a hat-trick against St Mirren in the Western League. He had been due to play in the Scottish Cup first round match against Galston on 13 January 1900. The club had arranged with the Caledonian Railway for the train carrying the team to stop at Gorbals to pick up Blackwood and William Goudie, but it did not stop. He did feature twice in the competition, scoring once, and scored seven goals in eight appearances for Thistle in the league. At the end of the season, Blackwood was recalled by Celtic, who then sold him to Football League Second Division club Woolwich Arsenal.

After joining Woolwich Arsenal in May 1900, Blackwood scored on his debut, in a 2–1 win over Gainsborough Trinity on the opening day of the 1900–01 season. This was to be his only season with the club; he scored six goals in 17 league appearances. He also scored during his one appearance in the FA Cup, against Darwen on 5 January 1901. He left for Reading in May 1901.

In November 1902, Blackwood joined Queens Park Rangers. He made 15 Southern League First Division appearances during the 1902–03 season, scoring nine goals. He also played and scored in the first round of the Southern Professional Charity Cup, against Luton Town, and featured in seven Western League matches, scoring two, and three London League games, scoring once. The following season, he scored 18 goals in 24 Southern League appearances, with returns of three goals in six appearances in the Western League, and two goals in six appearances in the London League.

He joined fellow Southern League First Division club West Ham United in December 1904. Taking over centre forward duties from Billy Bridgeman, he scored on his debut, against Portsmouth on 26 December, but his four-match run in the team coincided with one of the club's worst ever losing streaks. (Note: West Ham lost nine matches between 26 November 1904 and 21 January 1905. This included eight league matches. West Ham's longest losing run in league competition is nine matches, in 1932.) He played the last of his games for West Ham on 7 January 1905, against his old club QPR, after which Bridgeman was recalled to the team. After leaving the Irons, he returned to Scotland, joining Royal Albert on 2 September 1905.

== Career statistics ==
Appearances and goals by club, season and competition
Club	Season	League			FA Cup (Note: Includes Scottish Cup and FA Cup)		Other		Total	
Club	Season	Division	Apps	Goals	Apps	Goals	Apps	Goals	Apps	Goals
Celtic	1899–1900	Scottish League Division One	1	0	0	0	—		1	0
Partick Thistle (loan)	1899–1900	Scottish League Division Two	8	7	2	1	—		10	8
Woolwich Arsenal	1900–01	Football League Second Division	17	6	1	1	—		18	7
Reading	1901–02	Southern League	23	6	2	0	—		25	6
Reading	1902–03	Southern League	0	0	0	0	—		0	0
Reading	Total		23	6	2	0			25	6
Queens Park Rangers	1902–03	Southern League	15	9	0	0	11 (Note: Includes 1 appearance (1 goal) in Southern Professional Charity Cup, 7 appearances (2 goals) in Western League and 3 appearances (2 goals) in London League.)	4	26	14
Queens Park Rangers	1903–04	Southern League	24	18	0	0	12 (Note: Includes 6 appearances (3 goals) in Western League and 6 appearances (2 goals) in London League.)	5	36	23
Queens Park Rangers	Total		39	27	0	0	23	9	61	37
West Ham United	1901–02	Southern League	4	0	0	0	—		4	0
Career total			92	46	5	2	23	9	119	58
