= 1917–18 Queens Park Rangers F.C. season =

English football club season

Queens Park Rangers
1917–18 season
- Chairman: J. H. Fielding
- Manager: James Howie
- Stadium: Loftus Road
- 1917–18 London Combination: 8th
- Top goalscorer: League: George Fox 8 All: George Dale 9
- Highest home attendance: 6,000 (1 April 1918) Vs Chelsea
- Lowest home attendance: 1,500 (6 April 1918) Vs Brentford
- Biggest win: 6–1 (19 January 1918) vs Clapton Orient
- Biggest defeat: 2–7 (2 February 1918) Vs Tottenham
Home colours	Away colours

The 1917–18 Queens Park Rangers season was the club's 30th season of existence and their 3rd season in The London Combination, a competition made up of reserve and senior teams founded during World War I. QPR finished 8th in the league during the campaign.

== Season summary ==
=== standings ===
Pos	Club	P	W	D	L	F	A	GA	Pts
2	West Ham United	36	20	9	7	103	51	2.861	49
3	Fulham	36	20	7	9	75	60	2.083	47
4	Tottenham Hotspur	36	22	2	12	86	56	2.388	46
5	The Arsenal	36	16	5	15	76	57	2.111	37
6	Brentford	36	16	3	17	81	94	2.250	35
7	Crystal Palace	36	13	4	19	54	83	1.500	30
8	Queens Park Rangers	36	14	2	20	20	48	0.555	30

=== Results ===
Date	Opponent	Venue	Result	Score F–A	Scorers	Attendance
1 September 1917	Arsenal	A	L	0–2		6,000
8 September 1917	West Ham	H	L	0–3		5,000
15 September 1917	Fulham	A	L	1–2	Gregory	4,000
22 September 1917	Crystal P	H	W	4–1	Dale, Thurman, Fox 2	
29 September 1917	Clapton Orient	H	W	2–0	Dale, Thurman	
6 October 1917	Millwall	A	L	2–4	Dale, Mitchell	3,500
13 October 1917	Tottenham	H	L	2–3	Thompson, Mitchell	2,000
20 October 1917	Chelsea	A	W	2–1	Dale 2	7,500
27 October 1917	Arsenal	H	W	2–0	Mitchell, Brown	5,000
3 November 1917	West Ham	A	L	0–4		4,500
10 November 1917	Fulham	H	L	2–3	Dale,Thurman	3,000
17 November 1917	Crystal P	A	L	1–4	Dale,	
24 November 1917	Clapton Orient	A	W	2–1	Fox, Campbell	
1 December 1917	Millwall	H	W	1–0	Brown,	3,000
8 December 1917	Tottenham	A	W	1–0	Smith	3,000
15 December 1917	Chelsea	H	L	0–1		4,000
22 December 1917	Arsenal	A	L	0–3		3,000
25 December 1917	Brentford	A	D	1–1	Walters	
26 December 1917	Brentford	H	L	0–4		
29 December 1917	West Ham	H	D	1–1	Smith	2,500
5 January 1918	Fulham	A	L	0–1		4,000
12 January 1918	Crystal P	H	W	2–1	Walters, Smith	2,000
19 January 1918	Clapton Orient	H	W	6–1	Brown, Dale, Fox 3, Walters	2,000
26 January 1918	Millwall	A	W	1–0	Mitchell	4,000
2 February 1918	Tottenham	H	L	2–7	Walters, Smith	3,000
9 February 1918	Brentford	A	L	1–6	Jones	3,000
16 February 1918	Arsenal	H	L	0–3		3,500
23 February 1918	West Ham	A	L	0–4		6,500
2 March 1918	Fulham	H	L	0–1		3,500
9 March 1918	Crystal P	A	W	2–0	Maclinton, Jones	
16 March 1918	Clapton Orient	A	W	1–0	Grendon	
23 March 1918	Millwall	H	W	4–1	Maclinton, Walters 3	3,000
29 March 1918	Chelsea	A	L	0–1		3,000
30 March 1918	Tottenham	A	W	2–1	Fox, Smith	5,000
1 April 1918	Chelsea	H	L	1–2	Fox	6,000
6 April 1918	Brentford	H	L	2–6	Maclinton 2	1,500

=== War Fund Cup ===
Date	Opponent	Venue	Result	Score F–A	Scorers	Attendance
13 April 1918	Crystal P	H	W	2-1	Britton, Archibald	1,000
20 April 1918	Crystal P	A	L	1-3	Dale	
27 April 1918	Millwall	H	W	4-3	Jefferson, Walters, Maclinton 2	2,000
4 May 1918	Millwall	A	L	1-3	Archibald	

== Squad ==
Position	Nationality	Name	London Combination Appearances	London Combination Goals	War Fund Cup Appearances	War Fund Cup Goals
GK	(England)	Joe Merrick				
GK	(England)	Harry Gould				
GK	(England)	Jack Durston				
GK	(Scotland)	Jock Denoon	33		2	
GK		Duffield	2		2	
DF	(England)	Billy Draper	29		4	
DF	(England)	Joe Wingrove				
DF	(England)	Harry Pullen				
DF		Hawkins	1			
DF	(England)	Joseph Wilde				
DF	(England)	Tom Millington				
DF	(England)	J H Steer	7		4	
DF	(England)	Francis Wright	23		3	
DF		H. Green			1	
DF		Basil Loney	16			
DF		A Read	1			
DF		Jack White	21			
MF		Griffen	3			
MF	(England)	Jack Gregory	6	1		
MF	(England)	Archie Mitchell	31	4	2	
MF	(England)	John Baldock	16		2	
MF	(England)	Jack Broster				
MF	(England)	Alf Whyman	1			
MF	(England)	George Fox	35	8	4	
MF	(England)	Bill Wake				
MF	(England)	Sam Downing	7		3	
MF	(England)	Frederick Congreve				
MF	(England)	F. Butler				
MF	(England)	W T Brown				
MF		Kellar	1			
MF		L Lewis	4			
MF		Arthur Sanders	1			
MF		Trindale	1			
FW	(England)	David Donald				
FW	(England)	Jimmy Birch				
FW	(England)	Jack Smith	10	5		
FW	(England)	Billy Thompson	3	1		
FW	(England)	Fred Grendon	35	1	2	
FW	(England)	George Dale	29	8	2	1
FW	(England)	Bob Jefferson	13		3	1
FW	(England)	George McClinton	7	4	3	2
FW	(England)	Joe Walters	15	7	2	1
FW	(England)	A E Brown	14	3		
FW		Jimmy Archibald			4	2
FW		Britton			1	1
FW		Sandy Campbell	2	1		
FW		John Coleman	1			
FW		Harry Cousins	3			
FW		Crosslands	1			
FW		Edwards	1			
FW		Hales	1			
FW		Hanford	1			
FW		Vincent Hassan	3			
FW		J Jones	2	2		
FW		Munson	1			
FW		Over	2			
FW		Harry Thurman	13	3		

== Transfers in ==
Name	from	Date	Fee
George Fox	Fulham	cs1917	
Thurman, Harry		cs1917	
Joe Walter	Oldham	Sep1917	
W T Brown		Oct1917	
Jack Smith	Third Lanark	Nov1917	
Cousins, T	Chelsea	Nov1917	
Bob Jefferson	Swindon	Dec1917	Loan
Duffield, J		Feb1918	
J H Steer		Feb1918	
Sam Downing		Mar1918	
George McClinton		Mar1918	
A E Brown		cs1918	

== Transfers out ==
Name	from	Date	Fee	Date	To	Fee
Duffield, J		Feb1918		cs 18		
Hassan, Vincent		Dec1916		cs 18		
Thurman, Harry		cs1917		cs 18		
Cousins, T	Chelsea	Nov1917		cs 18		
