= Jack Pryce =

Scottish footballer

Personal information
- Full name: John Pryce
- Date of birth: 25 January 1874
- Place of birth: Renton, Scotland
- Date of death: December 1905 (aged 31)
- Place of death: Renton, Scotland
- Positions: Centre forward; inside forward

Senior career*
Years	Team	Apps	(Gls)
1893–1896	Renton		
1896–1898	Hibernian	34	(13)
1898–1899	Glossop North End	20	(6)
1899–1901	Sheffield Wednesday	54	(5)
1901–1903	Queens Park Rangers	20	(2)
1903–1905	Brighton & Hove Albion	23	(5)
- * Club domestic league appearances and goals

John Pryce (25 January 1874 – December 1905), also known as Jack or Johnny Pryce, was a Scottish professional footballer who played as a centre forward or inside forward in the Scottish League for Renton and Hibernian, in the English Football League for Glossop North End and Sheffield Wednesday, and in the Southern League for Queens Park Rangers and Brighton & Hove Albion.

== Life and career ==
Pryce was born in Renton, Dunbartonshire, in 1874. He joined his local Scottish League club, Renton, in 1893. He helped them reach the 1895 Scottish Cup Final, taking two replays to beat Dundee in the semi-finals, but the then Second Division club lost 2–1 to St Bernard's.

In May 1896, Pryce moved on to Hibernian. He was ever-present as Hibs finished runners-up in his first season, and his 11 goals from 20 matches in league and cup made him the club's top scorer. He was selected at centre forward for Scotland's team to play Wales in the Home Championships in March 1927, but had to withdraw because of injury. In his second season with Hibs, he scored 3 goals from 16 matches as his team finished a distant third.

In the 1898 close season, Pryce became one of numerous Scottish professionals enticed over the border by Samuel Hill-Wood, then the wealthy and ambitious owner of Glossop North End, newly elected to the English Second Division, who would later become chairman of Arsenal. Pryce contributed 6 goals from 20 league matches as the team finished as runners-up and were promoted to the First Division, by which time he had moved on to Sheffield Wednesday, already a top-tier club.

Pryce's arrival failed to lift his new club off the foot of the table, but he was involved in a strange ending to a match. In November 1898, After Wednesday's match at home to Aston Villa in November 1898 was abandoned after 79 minutes because of bad light, the Football Association ordered it to be completed at a later date. On 13 March 1899, the remaining 11 minutes were duly played, but with several changes in personnel, one of which was the inclusion of Pryce, who had not even been at the club at the time of the original fixture. He played in 31 of the 34 Second Division matches as Wednesday won the 1899–1900 title and returned to the top flight, although he was sent off in the FA Cup replay which Wednesday lost to Sheffield United. He played in about half of the First Division fixtures in 1900–01.

Pryce then spent two seasons with Queens Park Rangers: he played in half of a possible 30 Southern League matches in his first season but appeared in only 5 in 1902–03. He joined another Southern League club, Brighton & Hove Albion, in October 1903, made his debut in December, and was ever-present until the end of the season, but played only twice in 1904–05.

He returned to his native Scotland, where an accident left him unable to work and thus unable to support his wife and three children. In late October 1905, he was reported to be "lying very ill at Renton, there being faint hopes of his recovery." A benefit match arranged in mid-November between Old Rentonians, featuring well-known players including Scotland internationals James McCall, Neil McCallum, Duncan McLean and John Murray, and the Scottish Amateurs was well supported. Pryce died at Renton in early December at the age of 30.

== Career statistics ==
Appearances and goals by club, season and competition
Club	Season	League			National Cup (Note: Includes Scottish Cup, FA Cup)		Total	
Club	Season	Division	Apps	Goals	Apps	Goals	Apps	Goals
Hibernian	1896–97	Scottish First Division	18	10	2	1	20	11
Hibernian	1897–98	Scottish First Division	16	3	4	1	20	4
Hibernian	Total		34	13	6	2	40	15
Glossop North End	1898–99	Football League Second Division	20	6	4	2	24	8
Sheffield Wednesday	1898–99	Football League First Division	7	0	—		7	0
Sheffield Wednesday	1898–99	Football League Second Division	31	4	3	0	34	4
Sheffield Wednesday	1898–99	Football League First Division	16	1	1	0	17	1
Sheffield Wednesday	Total		54	5	4	0	58	5
Queens Park Rangers	1901–02	Southern League First Division	15	2	3	0	18	2
Queens Park Rangers	1902–03	Southern League First Division	5	0	0	0	5	0
Queens Park Rangers	Total		20	2	3	0	23	2
Brighton & Hove Albion	1901–02	Southern League First Division	21	5	0	0	21	5
Brighton & Hove Albion	1902–03	Southern League First Division	2	0	0	0	2	0
Brighton & Hove Albion	Total		23	5	0	0	23	5
Career total			151	31	17	4	168	35

== Honours ==
Renton

- Scottish Cup runner-up: 1894–95

Hibernian

- Scottish Football League runner-up: 1896–97

Glossop North End

- Football League Second Division runner-up: 1898–99

Sheffield Wednesday

- Football League Second Division winner: 1899–1900
