= 1916–17 Queens Park Rangers F.C. season =

English football club season

Queens Park Rangers
1916–17 season
- Chairman: J. H. Fielding
- Manager: James Howie
- Stadium: Kensal Rise
- 1916–17 London Combination: 10th
- Top goalscorer: George Dale, Walter Lawrence,Vincent Hassan 10
- Highest home attendance: 6,000 (18 November 1916) Vs Chelsea , (28 April 1917) Vs Millwall
- Lowest home attendance: 700 (10 March 1917) Vs Crystal Palace
- Biggest win: 4–0 (6 January 1917) Vs Southampton
- Biggest defeat: 1–7 (2 December 1916) Vs Portsmouth, (30 December 1916) Vs Fulham
| Home colours | Away colours |

The 1916–17 Queens Park Rangers season was the club's 29th season of existence and their 2nd season in The London Combination, a competition made up of reserve and senior teams founded during World War I. QPR finished 10th in the league during the campaign.

== League standings ==
| Pos | Club | P | W | D | L | F | A | GA | Pts |
|---|---|---|---|---|---|---|---|---|---|
| 4 | Tottenham Hotspur | 40 | 24 | 5 | 11 | 112 | 64 | 2.800 | 53 |
| 5 | The Arsenal | 40 | 19 | 10 | 11 | 62 | 47 | 1.550 | 48 |
| 6 | Fulham | 40 | 21 | 3 | 16 | 102 | 63 | 2.550 | 45 |
| 7 | Luton Town | 39 | 20 | 3 | 16 | 101 | 82 | 2.589 | 43 |
| 8 | Crystal Palace | 38 | 14 | 7 | 17 | 68 | 72 | 1.789 | 35 |
| 9 | Southampton | 39 | 13 | 8 | 18 | 57 | 80 | 1.461 | 34 |
| 10 | Queens Park Rangers | 39* | 10 | 9 | 20 | 48 | 86 | 1.230 | 29 |

=== Results ===
QPR scores given first

Win Draw Loss

=== London Combination Principal Tournament ===
| Date | Venue | Opponent | Result | Score F–A | Scorers | Attendance | League Position |
|---|---|---|---|---|---|---|---|
| 2 September 1916 | H | Luton | L | 1–4 | Dale | | 9 |
| 9 September 1916 | A | Reading | W | 3–2 | Pennifer, Smith (og), Matthews | 2,000 | 8 |
| 16 September 1916 | H | Millwall | L | 0–4 | | 4,000 | 9 |
| 23 September 1916 | A | Watford | L | 0–2 | | 1,000 | 13 |
| 30 September 1916 | H | Clapton Orient | D | 0–0 | | 3,000 | 11 |
| 7 October 1916 | A | Fulham | L | 0–2 | | 5,000 | 13 |
| 14 October 1916 | A | Southampton | L | 1–2 | Fox | | 13 |
| 21 October 1916 | H | West Ham | L | 0–4 | | 3,000 | 13 |
| 28 October 1916 | A | Tottenham | W | 5–4 | Elliott (og), Dale, Salmon 2, Mitchell | 4,000 | 13 |
| 4 November 1916 | H | Crystal P | W | 1–0 | Lawrence | 1,500 | 10 |
| 11 November 1916 | A | Brentford | W | 4–1 | Lawrence 3, Dale | 2,000 | 9 |
| 18 November 1916 | H | Chelsea | L | 1–2 | Dale | 6,000 | 11 |
| 25 November 1916 | A | Luton | L | 0–6 | | 3,000 | 11 |
| 2 December 1916 | H | Portsmouth | L | 1–7 | Kinlin | | 11 |
| 9 December 1916 | A | Millwall | L | 1–2 | Hassan | 5,000 | 11 |
| 23 December 1916 | A | Clapton Orient | L | 1–2 | Mitchell (pen) | | 11 |
| 25 December 1916 | H | Arsenal | L | 2–3 | Dale, Hassan | 3,000 | 12 |
| 26 December 1916 | A | Arsenal | D | 0–0 | | 4,500 | 11 |
| 30 December 1916 | H | Fulham | L | 1–7 | Lawrence | 3,000 | 13 |
| 6 January 1917 | H | Southampton | W | 4–0 | Hassan 2, Lawrence, Baldock | 1,000 | 11 |
| 13 January 1917 | A | West Ham | L | 3–5 | Dale, Whyman, Lawrence | 5,000 | 12 |
| 20 January 1917 | H | Tottenham | D | 1–1 | Hassan | 1,200 | 10 |
| 27 January 1917 | A | Crystal P | L | 0–4 | | 1,500 | 12 |
| 3 February 1917 | H | Brentford | W | 2–0 | Whiting, Hassan | 1,000 | 10 |
| 10 February 1917 | A | Chelsea | L | 0–3 | | 4,000 | 10 |
| 17 February 1917 | H | Watford | W | 2–1 | Lawrence, Hassan | | 10 |
| 24 February 1917 | A | Luton | L | 0–2 | | | 11 |
| 3 March 1917 | A | Fulham | D | 0–0 | | 3,000 | 11 |
| 10 March 1917 | H | Crystal P | W | 3–2 | Lawrence, Hassan 2 | 700 | 11 |
| 17 March 1917 | A | Millwall | L | 0–1 | | 5,000 | 11 |
| 24 March 1917 | H | Brentford | D | 2–2 | Dale, Barlow | | 11 |
| 31 March 1917 | A | Watford | W | 2–1 | Grimsdell (og), Goddard | 500 | 10 |
| 6 April 1917 | H | Chelsea | D | 2–2 | Hassan, Baldock | 3,500 | 10 |
| 7 April 1917 | H | Luton | D | 2–2 | Dale 2 (1 pen) | 3,000 | 10 |
| 9 April 1917 | A | Chelsea | L | 1–3 | Lawrence | 7,000 | 10 |
| 14 April 1917 | H | Fulham | W | 2–0 | Dale, Baldock | 1,500 | 10 |
| 19 April 1917 | A | Brentford | D | 0–0 | | 1,000 | 10 |
| 21 April 1917 | A | Crystal P | L | 0–3 | | | 10 |
| 28 April 1917 | H | Millwall | D | 0–0 | | 6,000 | 10 |

== Squad ==
| Position | Nationality | Name | London Combination Appearances | London Combination Goals |
|---|---|---|---|---|
| GK | (England) | Jack Durston | 11 | |
| GK | (Scotland) | Jock Denoon | 19 | |
| GK | (England) | William Winyard | 8 | |
| DF | (England) | Basil Loney | 22 | |
| DF | (England) | Billy Draper | 34 | |
| DF | (England) | Joe Wingrove | | |
| DF | (England) | Harry Pullen | | |
| DF | (England) | Joseph Wilde | | |
| DF | (England) | Tom Millington | | |
| DF | (England) | Francis Wright | 23 | |
| DF | (England) | Jack White | 4 | |
| DF | (England) | Bill Hooper | 8 | |
| DF | (England) | George Somerville | 1 | |
| DF | (England) | H. Green | 6 | |
| MF | (England) | Lewis Lewis | 17 | |
| MF | (England) | G. Hughes | 1 | |
| MF | (England) | Jack Gregory | | |
| MF | (England) | Archie Mitchell | 39 | 2 |
| MF | (England) | John Baldock | 24 | 3 |
| MF | (England) | Jack Broster | 1 | |
| MF | (England) | Alf Whyman | 11 | 1 |
| MF | (England) | George Fox | 12 | 1 |
| MF | (England) | Bill Wake | 3 | |
| MF | (England) | F. Butler | 4 | |
| MF | (England) | John Brown | 1 | |
| MF | (England) | John Pennifer | 6 | 1 |
| MF | (England) | David Nisbet | 3 | |
| MF | | Vincent Hassan | 22 | 10 |
| FW | (England) | Walter Lawrence | 20 | 10 |
| FW | (England) | David Donald | 6 | |
| FW | (England) | Jimmy Birch | 1 | |
| FW | (England) | Billy Thompson | 2 | |
| FW | (England) | Fred Grendon | 21 | |
| FW | (England) | George Dale | 27 | 10 |
| FW | (England) | Tommy Simons | 1 | |
| FW | (England) | Alfred Hicks | 2 | |
| FW | (England) | A R Matthews | 3 | 1 |
| FW | (England) | Tommy Goddard | 13 | 1 |
| FW | (England) | George Whiting | 8 | 1 |
| Guest | (England) | Drysdale, J (Driver) | 1 | |
| Guest | (England) | Saxon, Victor (Capt) | 1 | |
| Guest | (England) | Berrington, Alf | 1 | |
| Guest | (England) | Salmon, E (Pte) | 3 | 2 |
| Guest | (England) | Tebay, Albert | 2 | |
| Guest | (England) | Wren, A W | 1 | |
| Guest | (England) | Richards, George | 1 | |
| Guest | (England) | Toms, Jack | 2 | |
| Guest | (England) | Birkett (Bomber) | 1 | |
| Guest | (England) | Wash, J (Air-Mech) | 2 | |
| Guest | (England) | Beale, Leo (Air-Mech) | 1 | |
| Guest | (England) | Kirk, T (Pte) | 1 | |
| Guest | (England) | Shult (Pte) | 1 | |
| Guest | (England) | Wise, E A | 1 | |
| Guest | (England) | Soffe (P.C.) | 1 | |
| Guest | (England) | Kinlin, Richard (Pte) | 1 | 1 |
| Guest | (England) | Virtue, G (Pte) | 2 | |
| Guest | (England) | Beckerley, Fred | 1 | |
| Guest | (England) | Howie, David | 2 | |
| Guest | (England) | Needham (Pte) | 2 | |
| Guest | (England) | Thompson, Andy | 2 | |
| Guest | (England) | Thwaites, Arthur | 2 | |
| Guest | (England) | Marshall, J | 1 | |
| Guest | (England) | Strickland (Air-Mech) | 1 | |
| Guest | (England) | Fleming (Pte) | 1 | |
| Guest | (England) | Lawford, B (Pte) | 3 | |
| Guest | (England) | Barlow, L (Sgt) | 3 | 1 |
| Guest | (England) | Crossley, T | 3 | |
| Guest | (England) | James, Oscar | 1 | |

== Transfers in ==
| Name | from | Date | Fee |
|---|---|---|---|
| Green, H | | cs1916 | |
| Bennett, F | | cs1916 | |
| A R Matthews | The Army (Lt) | Sep1916 | |
| Lewis Lewis | Boscombe | Sep1916 | |
| Walter Lawrence | Crystal P | Oct1916 | |
| William Winyard | Millwall | Oct1916 | |
| Francis Wright | | Nov1916 | |
| Vincent Hassan | | Dec1916 | |
| Tommy Goddard | Dulwich Hamlet | Dec1916 | |
| Fred Grendon | Northampton | Dec1916 | Loan |
| F Butler | | Dec1916 | |
| John Brown | Reading | 2 Dec 1916 | |
| Jock Denoon | Chelsea | 12 January 1917 | |
| George Whiting | Blackpool | Feb1917 | |
| Hughes, G | | Apr1917 | |
| Jack White | | Apr1917 | |
| George Fox | Fulham | cs1917 | |
| Thurman, Harry | | cs1917 | |

== Transfers out ==
| Name | from | Date | Fee | Date | To | Fee |
|---|---|---|---|---|---|---|
| Matthews, F W * | Hampstead Town | cs1913 | | cs 1916 | | |
| Jefferies, Harry | | Oct1915 | | cs 1916 | | |
| Payne, Arthur | Old Crusaders | Aug1914 | | cs 1916 | | |
| Robinson, T | Catford Southend | cs1915 | | cs 1916 | | |
| Hughes, T | | Mar1916 | | cs 1916 | | |
| Cannell, Alfred | | July1914 | | cs 1916 | | |
| Humphreys, Arthur | Hampstead Town | cs1915 | | cs 1916 | | |
| Linkson, Oscar | Shelbourne | cs1915 | | August 1916 | Died in WW1 | |
| George Somerville | | Feb1916 | | September 1916 | | |
| David Nisbet | London Caledonians | cs1915 | | September 1916 | | |
| Alfred Hicks | Ilford | Oct1915 | | October 1916 | Clapton Orient | |
| A R Matthews | The Army (Lt) | Sep1916 | | October 1916 | The Army | |
| Green, H | | cs1916 | | December 1916 | | |
| John Brown, | Reading | 2 Dec 1916 | | December 1916 | Southampton | |
| John Pennifer | Hampstead Town | July1913 | | December 1916 | Luton | |
| Blake, Freddie * | Ilford | Jan1914 | | December 1916 | Clapton Orient | |
| George Fox | Hampstead Town | Mar1915 | | December 1916 | Fulham | |
| Higgins, Dan * | Kingston-on-Thames | Jan1913 | | December 1916 | Retired (war injury) | |
| Bill Hooper | Hampstead Town | Feb1916 | | January 1917 | | |
| William Winyard | Millwall | Oct1916 | | April 1917 | Clapton Orient | |
