= Maxwelltown Volunteers F.C. =

Former association football club in Scotland

Maxwelltown Volunteers Football Club
- Full name: Maxwelltown Volunteers Football Club
- Nickname(s): the Volunteers
- Founded: 1897
- Dissolved: 1908
- Ground: Palmerston Park, Dumfries
Home colours

The Maxwelltown Volunteers Football Club was a football team based in Dumfries, Scotland.

== History ==
The club emerged from volunteer regiments (i.e. part-time soldiers) being raised in response to increasing unrest within Continental Europe and the British Empire, the Maxwelltown Volunteers being founded by 1860. Ultimately eleven Companies were raised throughout Galloway and their services accepted by Queen Victoria. Maxwelltown in Dumfries was the home of the 5th Kirkcudbrightshire Rifle Volunteers, until in 1896 reforms saw the 5th KRV abolished, its members joining the Maxwelltown Volunteers regiment and the members of the former regiment's football club founding a new club in 1897.

The Volunteers entered the Scottish Cup from 1901 to 1908. The club won its way through the qualifying rounds to the competition proper four times, but never reached the second round proper. Its best performance was in 1903–04, twice holding Abercorn F.C. to draws before losing in the second replay.

The club had considerable success on a local level. The club won the Southern Counties Cup, for teams in the south-west of Scotland, in 1905 and 1908, and every other year from 1904 to 1907 won the Consolation Cup for clubs knocked out before the final. The club also won the less prestigious Dumfries & Galloway Cup three times.

The club's sole league season was a mid-table finish in the Scottish Combination in 1907–08. A re-organisation of private militias in 1908 saw all volunteer forces in Galloway absorbed into the 5th King's Own Scottish Borderers Regiment, which saw the Volunteers re-form as a new club, the 5th King's Own Scottish Borderers. After the troops returned from the First World War, the 5th KOSB joined forces with other local teams in the Dumfries area to form the current Scottish Football League side Queen of the South in 1919.

== Colours ==
The club played in blue.

== Ground ==
The club played at Palmerston Park.

== Honours ==
Southern Counties Cup

- Winners: 1904–05, 1907–08
- Runners-up: 1901–02

Dumfries & Galloway Cup

- Winners: 1902–03, 1903–04, 1907–08

== Notable players ==
- Bobby Colvin, former Liverpool F.C. player, played for the Volunteers in 1905.
- David Calderhead Jr, future Chelsea F.C. player, played for the Volunteers in 1906.
- Tommy Gibson, who left the Volunteers for Nottingham Forest in 1907.
