= 1898–99 Scottish Division Two =

Scottish Second Division
- Season: 1898–99
- Champions: Kilmarnock
- Promoted: Kilmarnock

The 1898–99 Scottish Second Division was the sixth season of the Scottish Football League Second Division.

Defending champions Kilmarnock retained their title after going through the full season unbeaten. It was the only time that a team has gone unbeaten for a full season in the second tier of Scottish football. Kilmarnock were subsequently elected to the Scottish Football League First Division for the 1899–1900 season.

== Background ==
The Scottish Football League Second Division was formed in 1893 and first contested in the 1893–94 season.

Kilmarnock were the defending champions having won the 1897–98 title by four points over nearest rivals Port Glasgow Athletic. However, they were not elected to Division One as the three proceeding league champions had been and instead would remain in Division Two. Only once previously had the Division Two winners not been elected to Division One – Hibernian in 1893–94.

== Format ==
The league took on a traditional double round robin format. Each team played every other team twice – once at home and once away from home – for a total of 18 matches each. Two points were awarded for a win, one point was awarded for a draw and nothing was awarded for a loss. Teams were ranked on total number of points accumulated. There were no tie breakers so teams finishing level on points were considered of equal rank.

== Table ==
Pos	Team	Pld	W	D	L	GF	GA	GD	Pts	Promotion or relegation
1	Kilmarnock (C, P)	18	14	4	0	73	24	+49	32	Elected to the 1899–1900 Scottish First Division
2	Leith Athletic	18	12	3	3	63	38	+25	27	
3	Port Glasgow Athletic	18	12	1	5	75	51	+24	25	
4	Motherwell	18	7	6	5	41	40	+1	20	
5	Airdrieonians	18	6	3	9	36	46	−10	15	
5	Hamilton Academical	18	7	1	10	48	58	−10	15	
7	Ayr	18	5	3	10	35	51	−16	13	
7	Morton	18	6	1	11	36	42	−6	13	
9	Linthouse	18	5	1	12	29	62	−33	11	
10	Abercorn	18	4	1	13	41	65	−24	9	

Rules for classification: Teams finish equal if level on points. Points system: 2 points for a win, 1 point for a draw, 0 points for a loss.
(C) Champions; (P) Promoted

== Aftermath ==
Having successfully defended their title, Kilmarnock were later elected to Scottish Football League First Division for the 1899–1900 season.

This was the only time that a team completed an unbeaten season in the second tier of Scottish football.
