= 1899–1900 Celtic F.C. season =

Celtic
1899–1900 season
- Manager: Willie Maley
- Stadium: Celtic Park
- Scottish First Division: 2nd
- Scottish Cup: Winners

1899–1900 was Celtic's twelfth season of competitive football. They competed in the Scottish First Division, in which they ended runners-up. They won the Scottish Cup for the second season in a row, defeating Queen's Park 4–3. It was the seventh major domestic competition won by Celtic.

Forward Sandy McMahon, who had been playing for the club since 1890, became the club's third ever captain, following Dan Doyle's retirement.

== Competitions ==
=== Scottish First Division ===
==== League table ====
Pos	Team	Pld	W	D	L	GF	GA	GD	Pts	Qualification or relegation
1	Rangers (C)	18	15	2	1	69	27	+42	32	Champions
2	Celtic	18	9	7	2	46	27	+19	25	
3	Hibernian	18	9	6	3	43	24	+19	24	
4	Heart of Midlothian	18	10	3	5	41	24	+17	23	
5	Kilmarnock	18	6	6	6	30	37	−7	18	

Source: "1899-1900 Division 1 - SPFL Archive". SPFL.
Rules for classification: Teams finish equal if level on points. Points system: 2 points for a win, 1 point for a draw, 0 points for a loss
(C) Champions

==== Matches ====
19 August 1899 First Division	Celtic	3–2	Clyde	Glasgow
				Stadium: Celtic Park; Attendance: 10,000

26 August 1899 First Division	Kilmarnock	2–2	Celtic	Kilmarnock
				Stadium: Rugby Park; Attendance: 11,500

2 September 1899 First Division	Celtic	5–2	Third Lanark	Glasgow
				Stadium: Celtic Park; Attendance: 10,000

9 September 1899 First Division	Celtic	2–1	Hibernian	Glasgow
				Stadium: Celtic Park; Attendance: 15,000

18 September 1899 First Division	Hibernian	1–1	Celtic	Edinburgh
				Stadium: Easter Road; Attendance: 12,000

23 September 1899 First Division	Clyde	0–5	Celtic	Glasgow
				Stadium: Shawfield Stadium; Attendance: 8,500

25 September 1899 First Division	Third Lanark	0–3	Celtic	Glasgow
				Stadium: Cathkin Park; Attendance: 10,000

30 September 1899 First Division	Celtic	0–2	Hearts	Glasgow
				Stadium: Celtic Park; Attendance: 10,000

7 October 1899 First Division	Rangers	3–3	Celtic	Glasgow
				Stadium: Ibrox Park; Attendance: 48,000

21 October 1899 First Division	St Mirren	2–2	Celtic	Paisley
				Stadium: St Mirren Park, Love Street; Attendance: 7,000

28 October 1899 First Division	Celtic	5–0	St Bernard's	Glasgow
				Stadium: Celtic Park; Attendance: 2,000

4 November 1899 First Division	Hearts	3–2	Celtic	Edinburgh
				Stadium: Tynecastle Park; Attendance: 10,000

25 November 1899 First Division	Dundee	1–2	Celtic	Dundee
				Stadium: Dens Park; Attendance: 10,000

2 December 1899 First Division	St Bernard's	1–1	Celtic	Edinburgh
				Stadium: New Logie Green; Attendance: 4,000

9 December 1899 First Division	Celtic	3–1	St Mirren	Glasgow
				Stadium: Celtic Park; Attendance: 3,000

16 December 1899 First Division	Celtic	3–3	Kilmarnock	Glasgow
				Stadium: Celtic Park; Attendance: 2,000

23 December 1899 First Division	Celtic	1–1	Dundee	Glasgow
				Stadium: Celtic Park; Attendance: 1,000

1 January 1900 First Division	Celtic	3–2	Rangers	Glasgow
				Stadium: Celtic Park; Attendance: 21,000

=== Inter City League ===
29 December 1899 Inter City League	Hibernian	1–0	Celtic	Edinburgh
				Stadium: Easter Road

20 January 1900 Inter City League	Celtic	3–2	Queen's Park	Glasgow
				Stadium: Celtic Park

3 March 1900 Inter City League	Celtic	4–1	Hibernian	Glasgow
				Stadium: Celtic Park

17 March 1900 Inter City League	Third Lanark	4–4	Celtic	Glasgow
				Stadium: Cathkin Park

24 March 1900 Inter City League	Queen's Park	1–3	Celtic	Glasgow
				Stadium: Hampden Park

31 March 1900 Inter City League	Rangers	1–2	Celtic	Glasgow
				Stadium: Ibrox Park

16 April 1900 Inter City League	Celtic	2–1	Rangers	Glasgow
				Stadium: Celtic Park

21 April 1900 Inter City League	Hearts	3–2	Celtic	Edinburgh
				Stadium: Tynecastle Park

5 May 1900 Inter City League	Celtic	1–1	Third Lanark	Glasgow
				Stadium: Celtic Park

7 May 1900 Inter City League	Celtic	5–0	Hearts	Glasgow
				Stadium: Celtic Park

=== Scottish Cup ===
13 January 1900 First round	Celtic	7–1	Bo'ness	Glasgow
				Stadium: Celtic Park; Attendance: 1,000

27 January 1900 Second round	Port Glasgow Athletic	1–5	Celtic	Port Glasgow
				Stadium: Clune Park; Attendance: 4,000

17 February 1901 Third round	Celtic	4–0	Kilmarnock	Glasgow
				Stadium: Celtic Park; Attendance: 8,000

24 February 1900 Semi-final	Rangers	2–2	Celtic	Glasgow
				Stadium: Ibrox Park; Attendance: 17,000

10 March 1900 Semi-final Replay	Celtic	4–0	Rangers	Glasgow
				Stadium: Celtic Park; Attendance: 32,000

14 April 1900 Final	Celtic	4–3	Queen's Park	Glasgow
				Stadium: Ibrox Park; Attendance: 18,000
