= William Goudie =

Scottish footballer

Personal information
- Position: Left-half

Senior career*
Years	Team	Apps	(Gls)
1896–1898	Third Lanark	1	(0)
1898–1899	Rangers	0	(0)
1899–1901	Partick Thistle	36	(1)
1901–1909	Falkirk	2	(0)
1901	→ Rangers (loan)	1	(0)
- * Club domestic league appearances and goals

William B. Goudie was a footballer who played as a left-half in the Scottish League for Third Lanark, Rangers, Partick Thistle and Falkirk.

== Career ==
Goudie joined Third Lanark on 31 December 1896. He then played for Rangers before joining Partick Thistle on 1 August 1899. He made 36 Scottish League appearances, and three in the Scottish Cup, for Thistle. He had been due to play in the Scottish Cup first round match against Galston on 13 January 1900. The club had arranged with the Caledonian Railway for the train carrying the team to stop at Gorbals to pick up Goudie and John Blackwood, but it did not stop.

Goudie joined Falkirk on 13 September 1901. He made his league debut for the club against Clyde on 16 August 1902. During his time there, he won the Falkirk Infirmary Shield and the Stirlingshire Consolation Cup in 1901–02, and was runner-up in the Dewar Shield in 1903–04. He returned to Rangers on loan briefly in September 1901.
