= John Murray (footballer, born 1874) =

Scottish footballer

Personal information
- Date of birth: c. 1874
- Date of death: 17 October 1933 (aged 58–59)
- Position: Inside forward

Senior career*
Years	Team	Apps	(Gls)
1891–1897	Renton	93	(23)
1897–1898	Dundee	0	(0)

International career
1895	Scotland	1	(0)
- * Club domestic league appearances and goals

John Murray (c. 1874 – 17 October 1933) was a Scottish footballer who played as an inside forward.

== Career ==
Murray played club football for Renton and Dundee, and made one appearance for Scotland against Wales in March 1895. He was runner-up in the Scottish Cup with Renton in 1895.
