= 1897–98 Hibernian F.C. season =

Hibernian
1897–98 season
- Scottish First Division: 3rd
- Scottish Cup: 3rd Round
- Average home league attendance: 13,721 (down 618)

During the 1897–98 season Hibernian, a football club based in Edinburgh, finished third out of 10 clubs in the Scottish First Division.

== Scottish First Division ==
| Match Day | Date | Opponent | H/A | Score | Hibernian Scorer(s) | Attendance |
|---|---|---|---|---|---|---|
| 1 | 4 September | Celtic | A | 1–4 | | 17,000 |
| 2 | 11 September | Rangers | A | 0–1 | | 15,000 |
| 3 | 18 September | Heart of Midlothian | H | 1–1 | | 14,000 |
| 4 | 25 September | St Bernard's | A | 2–3 | | 4,000 |
| 5 | 27 September | Third Lanark | A | 3–1 | | 7,000 |
| 6 | 2 October | Partick Thistle | H | 4–2 | | 6,000 |
| 7 | 9 October | Clyde | H | 5–0 | | 2,500 |
| 8 | 16 October | St Bernard's | H | 6–1 | | 4,000 |
| 9 | 23 October | St Mirren | A | 3–2 | | 4,000 |
| 10 | 6 November | Third Lanark | H | 6–0 | | 15,000 |
| 11 | 13 November | Dundee | H | 2–0 | | 5,000 |
| 12 | 20 November | Partick Thistle | A | 3–0 | | 3,000 |
| 13 | 27 November | Celtic | H | 1–2 | | 12,000 |
| 14 | 4 December | Dundee | A | 1–1 | | 4,000 |
| 15 | 11 December | Rangers | H | 0–5 | | 9,000 |
| 16 | 18 December | Heart of Midlothian | A | 2–3 | | 7,000 |
| 17 | 25 December | St Mirren | H | 3–1 | | 2,000 |
| 18 | 3 January | Clyde | A | 4–2 | | 1,500 |

=== Final League table ===
| P | Team | Pld | W | D | L | GF | GA | GD | Pts |
|---|---|---|---|---|---|---|---|---|---|
| 2 | Rangers | 18 | 13 | 3 | 2 | 71 | 15 | 56 | 29 |
| 3 | Hibernian | 18 | 10 | 2 | 6 | 47 | 29 | 18 | 22 |
| 4 | Heart of Midlothian | 18 | 8 | 4 | 6 | 54 | 33 | 21 | 20 |

=== Scottish Cup ===
| Round | Date | Opponent | H/A | Score | Hibernian Scorer(s) | Attendance |
|---|---|---|---|---|---|---|
| R1 | 14 January | Abercorn | A | 1–1 | | 2,000 |
| R1 R | 15 January | Abercorn | H | 7–1 | | 4,000 |
| R2 | 22 January | East Stirlingshire | H | 3–1 | | 2,000 |
| R3 | 5 February | Third Lanark | A | 0–2 | | 12,000 |

== See also ==
- List of Hibernian F.C. seasons
