= 1900–01 Woolwich Arsenal F.C. season =

English football club season

Woolwich Arsenal
1900–01 season
- Manager: Harry Bradshaw
- Stadium: Manor Ground
- Second Division: 7th
- FA Cup: Second Round
Home colours	Away colours

In the 1900–01 season, Woolwich Arsenal played 34 games, won 15, drew 6 and lost 13. The team finished 7th in the league.

== Results ==
Arsenal's score comes first

Win	Draw	Loss

=== Football League Second Division ===
Date	Opponent	Venue	Result	Attendance	Scorers
1 September 1900	Gainsborough Trinity	H	2–1		
8 September 1900	Walsall	H	1–1		
15 September 1900	Burton Swifts	A	0–1		
22 September 1900	Barnsley	H	1–2		
29 September 1900	Chesterfield Town	H	1–0		
6 October 1900	Blackpool	A	1–1		
13 October 1900	Stockport County	H	2–0		
20 October 1900	Small Heath	A	1–2		
27 October 1900	Grimsby Town	A	0–0		
3 November 1900	Leicester Fosse	H	2–1		
10 November 1900	Newton Heath	H	2–1		
17 November 1900	Glossop	A	1–0		
24 November 1900	Middlesbrough	H	1–0		
1 December 1900	Burnley	A	0–3		
8 December 1900	Burslem Port Vale	H	3–0		
15 December 1900	Leicester Fosse	A	0–1		
22 December 1900	New Brighton Tower	H	2–1		
24 December 1900	Walsall	A	0–1		
29 December 1900	Gainsborough Trinity	A	0–1		
12 January 1901	Burton Swifts	H	3–1		
19 January 1901	Barnsley	A	0–3		
26 January 1901	Lincoln City	A	3–3		
16 February 1901	Stockport County	A	1–3		
19 February 1901	Chesterfield Town	A	1–0		
2 March 1901	Grimsby Town	H	0–1		
9 March 1901	Lincoln City	H	0–0		
16 March 1901	Newton Heath	A	0–1		
23 March 1901	Glossop	H	2–0		
30 March 1901	Middlesbrough	A	1–1		
6 April 1901	Burnley	H	3–1		
8 April 1901	Blackpool	H	3–1		
13 April 1901	Burslem Port Vale	A	0–1		
22 April 1901	Small Heath	H	1–0		
27 April 1901	New Brighton Tower	A	0–1		

==== Final League table ====
Pos	Team	Pld	W	D	L	GF	GA	GAv	Pts	Promotion or relegation
1	Grimsby Town (C, P)	34	20	9	5	60	33	1.818	49	Promotion to the First Division
2	Small Heath (P)	34	19	10	5	57	24	2.375	48	Promotion to the First Division
3	Burnley	34	20	4	10	53	29	1.828	44	
4	New Brighton Tower	34	17	8	9	57	38	1.500	42	Dissolved
5	Glossop	34	15	8	11	51	33	1.545	38	
6	Middlesbrough	34	15	7	12	50	40	1.250	37	
7	Woolwich Arsenal	34	15	6	13	39	35	1.114	36	
8	Lincoln City	34	13	7	14	43	39	1.103	33	
9	Burslem Port Vale	34	11	11	12	45	47	0.957	33	
10	Newton Heath	34	14	4	16	42	38	1.105	32	
11	Leicester Fosse	34	11	10	13	39	37	1.054	32	
12	Blackpool	34	12	7	15	33	58	0.569	31	
13	Gainsborough Trinity	34	10	10	14	45	60	0.750	30	
14	Chesterfield Town	34	9	10	15	46	58	0.793	28	
15	Barnsley	34	11	5	18	47	60	0.783	27	
16	Walsall (R)	34	7	13	14	40	56	0.714	27	Failed re-election and demoted
17	Stockport County	34	11	3	20	38	68	0.559	25	Re-elected
18	Burton Swifts	34	8	4	22	34	66	0.515	20	Re-elected

Rules for classification: 1) Points; 2) Goal average; 3) Goals scored
(C) Champions; (P) Promoted; (R) Relegated

=== FA Cup ===
Round	Date	Opponent	Venue	Result	Attendance	Goalscorers
Intermediate Round	5 January 1901	Darwen	A	2–0		
Round 1	9 February 1901	Blackburn Rovers	H	2–0		
Round 2	23 February 1901	West Bromwich Albion	H	0–1		
