= Fred Bevan =

English footballer

Personal information
- Date of birth: 27 February 1879
- Place of birth: Poplar, London, England
- Date of death: 1935 (aged 55–56)
- Position: Forward

Senior career*
Years	Team	Apps	(Gls)
- Millwall Athletic
1901–1902	Manchester City	8	(1)
-1904	Reading		
1904-1906	Queens Park Rangers	32	(20)
1906–1907	Bury	31	(16)
1907	Fulham	5	(1)
1907–1909	Derby County	51	(17)
1909–1912	Clapton Orient	118	(35)
- Chatham
Total		213	(70)
- * Club domestic league appearances and goals

Frederick Edward T. Walter Bevan (27 February 1879 – 1935) was an English footballer who played in the Football League for Manchester City, Bury, Fulham, Derby County and Clapton Orient.
