= Patrick McManus (footballer) =

Scottish footballer

Personal information
- Full name: Patrick McManus
- Date of birth: 10 September 1867
- Place of birth: Blackburn, West Lothian, Scotland
- Date of death: 1940 (aged 68–69)
- Position: Wing half

Senior career*
Years	Team	Apps	(Gls)
1891–1892	Cowlairs		
1892–1893	Derby County	0	(0)
1893	Derby Town		
1893	Darlington		
1893	Mossend Swifts		
1894	St Bernard's		
1895	Celtic	1	(0)
1896	St Bernard's		
1896–1898	West Bromwich Albion	28	(1)
1898	Warmley		
1898	Thames Ironworks		
Total		28	(1)
- * Club domestic league appearances and goals

Patrick McManus (10 September 1867 – 1940) was a Scottish footballer who played in the Football League for West Bromwich Albion.
