= Tom Gray (footballer, born 1875) =

English footballer

Personal information
- Full name: Thomas Gray
- Date of birth: 24 July 1875
- Place of birth: Grimsby, England
- Date of death: 1944 (aged 68–69)
- Position: Inside forward

Senior career*
Years	Team	Apps	(Gls)
1897–1898	Saltburn		
1898–1898	Gainsborough Trinity	8	(1)
1899	Small Heath	0	(0)
1899–1900	New Brompton		
1900–1901	Queens Park Rangers	32	(10)
1901–1903	Bury	25	(5)
- * Club domestic league appearances and goals

Thomas Gray (24 July 1875–1944) was an English footballer who played in the Football League for Bury and Gainsborough Trinity.
