= Roger Evans (footballer) =

Welsh footballer

Personal information
- Date of birth: 17 November 1879
- Place of birth: Menai Bridge, Anglesey, Wales
- Date of death: 25 April 1974 (aged 94)
- Place of death: Swanage, Dorset, England
- Position: Centre forward

Senior career*
Years	Team	Apps	(Gls)
1898-1900	Ilford		
1900-1905	Clapton		
1899-1904	Queens Park Rangers	1	

International career
1902	Wales	1	(0)
- * Club domestic league appearances and goals

Roger Evans (17 November 1879-25 April 1974) was a Welsh international footballer. He was part of the Wales national football team, and was capped once for a match on 22 February 1902 against Ireland. At the time he was playing for Clapton.

== See also ==
- List of Wales international footballers (alphabetical)
