= James Cleland (footballer) =

Scottish footballer (1869–1942)

Personal information
- Full name: James Cleland
- Date of birth: 7 October 1869
- Place of birth: Glasgow, Scotland
- Date of death: 16 November 1942 (aged 73)
- Place of death: Glasgow, Scotland
- Position: Outside left

Senior career*
Years	Team	Apps	(Gls)
–1893	Minerva		
1893–1894	Third Lanark	11	(2)
1894–1896	St Bernard's	7	(2)
1895	→ Liverpool (loan)	1	(0)
1896–1897	Abercorn	5	(2)
1897–1898	Partick Thistle	6	(3)
- * Club domestic league appearances and goals

James Cleland (7 October 1869 – 16 November 1942) was a Scottish footballer who played as an outside left.

== Career ==
Cleland made one appearance for Liverpool, in the test match against Bury at the end of the 1894–95 season. Injuries to key players meant that Cleland got the chance to play for the club, following his loan from Edinburgh club St Bernard's.

== Personal life ==
Cleland was born on 7 October 1869 in Glasgow to Matthew Cleland, a mercantile clerk, and Margaret Lithgow Cleland (née Allan). Cleland married to Agnes Hutchison Rankin on 26 December 1901 in Glasgow. He died on 16 November 1942 in Glasgow at the age of 73.
