= 1896–97 Hibernian F.C. season =

Hibernian
1896–97 season
- Scottish First Division: 2nd
- Scottish Cup: 2nd Round
- Average home league attendance: 13,721 (down 618)

During the 1896–97 season Hibernian, a football club based in Edinburgh, finished second out of 10 clubs in the Scottish First Division.

== Scottish First Division ==
Match Day	Date	Opponent	H/A	Score	Hibernian Scorer(s)	Attendance
1	15 August	Celtic	H	3–1		12,000
2	19 August	Third Lanark	H	2–0		2,000
3	22 August	Dundee	A	0–3		6,000
4	29 September	Clyde	A	7–0		3,000
5	5 September	Rangers	H	4–3		10,000
6	12 September	Abercorn	A	2–2		1,000
7	19 September	St Bernard's	H	2–0		5,000
8	26 September	Heart of Midlothian	H	2–0		12,000
9	3 October	Rangers	A	3–4		2,000
10	17 October	St Bernard's	A	1–0		8,000
11	31 October	Dundee	H	3–1		6,000
12	7 November	Third Lanark	A	3–1		5,000
13	14 November	Clyde	H	5–1		2,000
14	21 November	Abercorn	H	5–0		900
15	28 November	Celtic	A	1–1		15,000
16	5 December	Heart of Midlothian	A	0–1		10,500
17	16 January	St Mirren	H	3–0		4,000
18	13 January	St Mirren	A	0–2		2,000

=== Final League table ===
P	Team	Pld	W	D	L	GF	GA	GD	Pts
1	Heart of Midlothian	18	13	2	3	47	22	25	28
2	Hibernian	18	12	2	4	50	20	30	26
3	Rangers	18	11	3	4	64	30	34	25

=== Scottish Cup ===
Round	Date	Opponent	H/A	Score	Hibernian Scorer(s)	Attendance
R1	9 January	Duncrab Park	A	10–1		
R2	23 January	Rangers	A	0–3		22,000

== See also ==
- List of Hibernian F.C. seasons
