= Duncan Ronaldson =

Scottish footballer

Personal information
- Full name: Duncan McKay Ronaldson
- Date of birth: 21 April 1879
- Place of birth: Blythswood, Scotland
- Date of death: 20 September 1947 (aged 68)
- Place of death: Glasgow, Scotland
- Height: 5 ft 8 in (1.73 m)
- Position: Inside forward

Senior career*
Years	Team	Apps	(Gls)
1898–1899	Vale of Clyde		
1899–1900	Rutherglen Glencairn		
1900–1901	Queen's Park Rangers	18	(8)
1901–1903	Grimsby Town	64	(19)
1903–1904	Bury	15	(4)
1904–1905	Queen's Park Rangers	21	(6)
1905–1907	Norwich City		
1907–1908	Brighton & Hove Albion	19	(6)
1908–1909	Southend United		
1909–1910	Norwich City		
1910–1913	Dunfermline Athletic	9	(1)
- * Club domestic league appearances and goals

Duncan McKay Ronaldson (21 April 1879 – 20 September 1947) was a Scottish professional footballer who played as an inside forward.
