= 1899–1900 Scottish Division One =

7th season of top-tier football league in Scotland

Scottish Division One
- Season: 1899–1900
- Champions: Rangers; 3rd title
- Relegated: St Bernard's; Clyde
- Matches: 90
- Goals: 379 (4.21 per match)
- Top goalscorer: Robert Hamilton; Willie Michael (15 goals each)

The 1899–1900 Scottish Division One season was won by Rangers by seven points over nearest rival Celtic.

== League table ==
Pos	Team	Pld	W	D	L	GF	GA	GD	Pts	Qualification or relegation
1	Rangers (C)	18	15	2	1	69	27	+42	32	Champions
2	Celtic	18	9	7	2	46	27	+19	25	
3	Hibernian	18	9	6	3	43	24	+19	24	
4	Heart of Midlothian	18	10	3	5	41	24	+17	23	
5	Kilmarnock	18	6	6	6	30	37	−7	18	
6	Dundee	18	4	7	7	36	39	−3	15	
6	Third Lanark	18	5	5	8	31	38	−7	15	
8	St Mirren	18	3	6	9	30	46	−16	12	
8	St Bernard's (R)	18	4	4	10	29	47	−18	12	Relegated to the 1900–01 Scottish Division Two
10	Clyde (R)	18	2	0	16	24	70	−46	4	Relegated to the 1900–01 Scottish Division Two

Source: "1899-1900 Division 1 - SPFL Archive". SPFL.
Rules for classification: Teams finish equal if level on points. Points system: 2 points for a win, 1 point for a draw, 0 points for a loss
(C) Champions; (R) Relegated

== Results ==
Home \ Away	CEL	CLY	DND	HOM	HIB	KIL	RAN	STB	STM	THI
Celtic		3–2	1–1	0–2	2–1	3–3	3–2	5–0	3–1	5–2
Clyde	0–5		0–7	1–2	3–4	2–3	2–6	2–4	3–1	4–2
Dundee	1–2	3–1		1–1	2–2	3–3	2–3	3–0	5–2	0–0
Heart of Midlothian	3–2	4–1	4–1		1–3	1–0	1–1	5–0	3–0	2–0
Hibernian	1–1	5–0	3–3	1–0		3–1	0–2	1–1	5–1	3–2
Kilmarnock	2–2	3–1	2–1	2–1	0–3		2–4	2–1	2–2	1–1
Rangers	3–3	7–0	6–0	4–3	3–2	6–1		4–3	4–1	2–1
St Bernard's	1–1	3–2	2–0	2–4	0–4	1–1	1–4		3–3	4–0
St Mirren	2–2	3–0	4–0	2–2	1–1	0–1	1–3	4–3		1–1
Third Lanark	0–3	5–0	3–3	3–2	1–1	2–1	1–5	2–0	5–1	

Legend: Blue = home team win; Yellow = draw; Red = away team win.
