= Jock Denoon =

Scottish footballer (1890–1952)

Personal information
- Full name: John Denoon
- Date of birth: 10 April 1890
- Place of birth: Inverness, Scotland
- Date of death: 1952 (aged 61–62)
- Position: Goalkeeper

Senior career*
Years	Team	Apps	(Gls)
1906–1907	Tockgorm		
1907–1908	Nelson (Inverness)		
1908–1909	Inverness Thistle		
1909–1910	Chelsea	0	(0)
1911–1913	Motherwell		
1914–1915	Norwich City		
1915–1917	Chelsea		
1917–1920	Queens Park Rangers		
1920–1927	Swansea Town	173	(0)
1927	Mid Rhondda United		
1927	New Tredegar		
Total		173	(0)
- * Club domestic league appearances and goals

John Denoon (10 April 1890 – 1952) was a Scottish footballer who played in the Football League for Swansea Town.
