= Charlie Aston =

English footballer

Personal information
- Full name: Charles Lane Aston
- Date of birth: 1875
- Place of birth: Bilston, England
- Date of death: 9 January 1931 (aged 55–56)
- Place of death: Leytonstone, England
- Position: Full back

Youth career
- Bilston United

Senior career*
| Years | Team | Apps | (Gls) |
| 1895–1898 | Walsall | | |
| 1898–1901 | Aston Villa | 23 | (0) |
| 1901–1902 | Queens Park Rangers | | |
| 1902–1903 | Burton United | | |
| 1903–1904 | Gresley Rovers | | |
| 1904–1905 | Burton United | | |
| 1905–1908 | Watford | | |
- Leyton
- * Club domestic league appearances and goals

Charles Lane Aston (1875 – 9 January 1931) was an English footballer.

== Career ==
Born in Bilston, Staffordshire, Aston started his career at local club Bilston United. He joined Walsall as a professional in December 1895, getting his first experience of playing in the Football League before joining First Division side Aston Villa in 1898. (Note: For the avoidance of confusion, in this article "Aston" used alone refers to the article's subject, Charlie Aston. "Villa" used alone refers to Aston Villa) During his first full season at the club, Aston played 13 games as Villa won the league. Villa retained their title in 1899–1900.

Aston left Villa in 1901. After one-season spells at Queens Park Rangers, Burton United, Gresley Rovers and Burton United again, Aston joined Watford in 1905. He played 51 games as Watford won the United League but finished 14th in the Southern League. The following season, Watford improved to finish 9th in the Southern League, and Aston scored his only goal for the club in a 2–0 win over Portsmouth on 22 September 1906 at Cassio Road. After playing in all 41 of Watford's fixtures in 1907–08, Aston left to club to join Leyton, with whom he finished his career. He died in Leytonstone on 9 January 1931.
