= Bobby Colvin =

Scottish footballer (1876–1940

Personal information
- Full name: Robert Colvin
- Date of birth: 5 December 1876
- Place of birth: Kirkconnel, Scotland
- Date of death: 1 October 1940 (aged 63)
- Height: 5 ft 4 in (1.63 m)
- Position: Outside right

Senior career*
Years	Team	Apps	(Gls)
1897-1898	Liverpool	3	
1897	Maxwelltown Thistle F.C.		
1898	Oldham County		
1898-99	Glossop North End	15	(2)
1899-1901	New Brighton Tower	34	(5)
1901-02	Luton Town	28	(2)
1902-03	Queens Park Rangers	11	(1)
1903-1904	Swindon Town		
1905	Maxwelltown Volunteers		
1905	Carlisle United		
Total		53	(7)
- * Club domestic league appearances and goals

Bobby Colvin (5 December 1876 – 1 October 1940) was a Scottish footballer who played as an outside right for Liverpool, Glossop North End (1898–99), New Brighton Tower, (1899–1901), Luton Town (1901–02), Queens Park Rangers (1902–03), Swindon Town (1903–04), and Carlisle United.
