= Harry Abbott (footballer, born 1883) =

English footballer

Personal information
- Date of birth: 1883
- Place of birth: Blackburn, England
- Position: Inside left

Senior career*
Years	Team	Apps	(Gls)
- Padiham
1901	Blackburn Rovers	0	(0)
1902-1904	Queens Park Rangers	23	(2)
1904	Bolton Wanderers	1	(0)
1905	Swindon Town	18	(2)
- * Club domestic league appearances and goals

Harry Abbott (born 1883) was a footballer who played in the Football League for Bolton Wanderers and in the Southern League for Swindon Town. He usually played inside right.
