= Harry Skinner (footballer) =

English footballer

Personal information
- Full name: Henry George Skinner
- Date of birth: 7 July 1875
- Place of birth: Windsor, Berkshire, England
- Date of death: 1946 (aged 70–71)
- Place of death: Windsor, England
- Position: Wing half

Senior career*
Years	Team	Apps	(Gls)
1895–1897	Windsor & Eton		
1897–1899	Uxbridge		
1899–1901	Queens Park Rangers	40	(1)
1901–1902	Grimsby Town	1	(0)
1902–1903	Queens Park Rangers	9	
- * Club domestic league appearances and goals

Henry George Skinner (7 July 1875 – 1946) was an English professional footballer who played as a wing half.

Signed from Uxbridge in August 1899 he turned professional at Qpr and played in 13 Southern league games in 1899-1900 and scored 1 goal in 27 Southern League appearances in 1900-01 before leaving for Second division champions Grimsby Town in July 1901. He appeared in 1 game in the football league first division before his return to Qpr playing 9 games before departing in November 1902.
