= John Bowman (footballer) =

English footballer and manager (1879–1943)

Personal information
- Full name: John William Bowman
- Date of birth: 23 April 1879
- Place of birth: Middlesbrough, England
- Date of death: 26 January 1943 (aged 63)
- Place of death: Sudbury, Middlesex, England
- Position: Defender

Youth career
- Shelton Juniors
- Hanley St. Jude's
- Burslem Park

Senior career*
Years	Team	Apps	(Gls)
1899	Burslem Port Vale	0	(0)
1899–1900	Stoke	4	(0)
1901–1905	Queens Park Rangers	175	(3)
1905	Norwich City		
Total		179	(3)

Managerial career
- 1905–1907: Norwich City
- 1912–1916: Croydon Common
- 1930–1931: Queens Park Rangers
- * Club domestic league appearances and goals

John William Bowman (23 April 1879 – 26 January 1943) was an English football player and manager.

He played one cup game for Burslem Port Vale in 1899, having previously appeared for several nearby amateur sides. He then spent two seasons with Stoke, playing four games in the Football League, before he joined Queens Park Rangers in 1901. In four years with QPR, he played more than 100 matches before he was selected to serve Norwich City as manager in March 1905. He stepped down in 1907, returning to the game in 1912 for a four-year stint as Croydon Common manager. He then returned to QPR in various roles whilst he ran his sports outfitters business at 7 Park Parade, Harlesden. He later became a club director, also briefly taking the managerial reins in 1931 before stepping down due to ill health.

== Playing career ==
Bowman moved to Staffordshire at a young age and started with Shelton Juniors before moving on to Hanley St. Jude's and Burslem Park before joining Burslem Port Vale of the Second Division in February 1899. He played at left-half in a 1–1 draw with Walsall in a Birmingham Senior Cup semi-final match on 13 March 1899, but was not selected again. After being released at the end of the season he moved on to their local rivals Stoke. He played two First Division for the "Potters" in both 1899–1900 and 1900–01, before he signed for Queens Park Rangers in June 1901, playing as centre-half. At this time he weighed 11 st 7 lb (73 kg) and was 5 ft 7 in (1.70 m) tall. He played 103 league games for the Southern League club, scoring two goals.

In addition to playing football, Bowman was also a renowned athlete (a strong runner and swimmer), a teetotaller, and a non-smoker. He married Elsie Ethel Annells at St John's Church, Kensal Green, in July 1905.

== Management career ==
After carrying out the role of club secretary at Queen's Park Rangers, Bowman was Norwich City's first-ever manager and was in charge for 78 matches between 1905 and 1907, winning 31, losing 24 and drawing 23 games. He also played several matches for the club.

Bowman is also the first person recorded as referring to the club as "the Canaries". The reference comes in an interview recorded in the Eastern Daily Press with the newly appointed manager in April 1905. The paper quotes him saying, "Well I knew of the City's existence... I have... heard of the canaries." Norwich City historian Eastwood notes:

This as far as we can tell is the first time that the popular pastime of the day ie... rearing... canaries was linked with Norwich City FC... the club still played in blue and white, and would continue to do so for another two seasons."

After leaving City, he took up the manager position of Croydon Common before returning to his old club, QPR, as a director and later as team manager. Appointed in May 1930, he had to retire due to ill health in November 1931. Bowman remained in the North West London area and ran a sports shop at 7 Park Parade, Harlesden, with branches in Wembley and Marylebone.

== Career statistics ==
=== Playing statistics ===
Appearances and goals by club, season and competition
Club	Season	League			FA Cup		Total	
Club	Season	Division	Apps	Goals	Apps	Goals	Apps	Goals
Burslem Port Vale	1898–99	Second Division	0	0	0	0	0	0
Stoke	1899–1900	First Division	2	0	0	0	2	0
Stoke	1900–01	First Division	2	0	0	0	2	0
Stoke	Total		4	0	0	0	4	0
Queens Park Rangers	1901–02	Southern League; Western League; London League	37	1	3	0	40	1
Queens Park Rangers	1902–03	Southern League; Western League; London League	46	0	1	0	47	0
Queens Park Rangers	1903–04	Southern League; Western League; London League	49	1	2	0	49	2
Queens Park Rangers	1904–05	Southern League; Western League	43	1	1	0	44	1
Queens Park Rangers	Total		175	3	7	0	182	3
Career total			179	3	7	0	186	3

=== Managerial statistics ===
Managerial record by team and tenure
Team	From	To	Record				
Team	From	To	P	W	D	L	Win %
Queens Park Rangers	31 May 1930	1 November 1931	58	23	9	26	39.7
