= Alf Hitch =

English footballer

Personal information
- Full name: Alfred Hitch
- Date of birth: 14 July 1876
- Place of birth: Walsall, England
- Date of death: 1962 (aged 85–86)
- Place of death: Uxbridge, England
- Position: Right-half

Senior career*
Years	Team	Apps	(Gls)
- Walsall Unity
- Brownhills Albion
1897	Walsall Wood Athletic		
1897–1898	Walsall	2	(0)
1898	Wellington Town		
1898	Thames Ironworks	3	(0)
1898	Grays United		
1899–1901	Queens Park Rangers	49	(5)
1901–1902	Nottingham Forest	13	(2)
1902–1906	Queens Park Rangers	92	(11)
1906–1908	Watford	69	(2)
- * Club domestic league appearances and goals

Alfred Hitch (14 July 1876 – 1962) was an English professional footballer who played as a right-half or centre-half. He played in the Football League for Walsall and Nottingham Forest, and in the Southern League for Thames Ironworks, Queens Park Rangers and Watford.

Hitch joined Second Division club Walsall in 1897 and made two appearances. In 1898, he made six appearances for Thames Ironworks, the club that would later be reformed as West Ham United.

He joined Queens Park Rangers in 1899 for the club's initial season in the Southern League First Division. He spent a season at First Division Nottingham Forest in 1901–02, before returning to QPR to captain the team. He ended his career at Watford, where he was also appointed captain.

Hitch was chosen to play in a 'South vs North' trial match for England in February 1901.
