= Jack White (footballer, born 1879) =

English footballer

Personal information
- Full name: Jabez W. White
- Date of birth: 1879
- Place of birth: Droylsden, England
- Position: Full back

Senior career*
Years	Team	Apps	(Gls)
- Ollenshaw United
- Grays Anchor
- Swanscombe
-May 1901	Grays United		
1901-1908	Queens Park Rangers	108	
1908–1910	Leeds City	60	(0)
- Merthyr Town
- * Club domestic league appearances and goals

Jabez W. "Jack" White (born 1879) was a footballer who played as a full back for Leeds City in the Football League. He also played for Ollenshaw United, Grays Anchor, Swanscombe, Grays United, Queens Park Rangers and Merthyr Town.
