= 1888 Scottish Cup final =

- Event: 1887–88 Scottish Cup
Renton	Cambuslang
6	1
- Date: 4 February 1888
- Venue: Hampden Park, Crosshill
- Referee: A. Kennedy
- Attendance: 15,000

The 1888 Scottish Cup final played at the second Hampden Park in Crosshill (today part of Glasgow) on 4 February 1888 was won by Renton, who beat Cambuslang 6–1.

== Background ==
Renton were favourites going into the match, the Dunbartonshire club having already lifted the trophy in 1885 and finished runners-up to Queen's Park in 1886; in contrast, it was Cambuslang's first and only major final, though the Lanarkshire side had won the first edition of the Glasgow Cup a week earlier, beating Rangers in the final.

== Match ==
The gate for the match - just under £600 - was the largest for any sporting fixture in Scotland to date, beating the record of £526 for the Scotland v England rugby union international at Raeburn Place three years before. As both team's colours were dark blue, one had to change, and Cambuslang donned white jerseys.

Reports from the day indicate that despite the outcome the final was very evenly fought for the most part, with Cambuslang having several chances and Renton goalkeeper John Lindsay performing strongly before his team eventually took control of the play. Indeed Cambuslang - who had won the toss, and played with the wind in the first half - had two corners against a "demoralised" Renton side before M'Nee scored a "lucky" goal for Renton after 17 minutes, against the run of play, placing the ball after a long and exciting scrimmage. Cambuslang tried to restore equality with "three hot rushes", but they were all "beautifully manœuvred" by Lindsay in the Renton goal. After M'Coll and M'Nee "work[ed] like demons" in the Renton forward line, Renton gained three swift corners, and M'Callum made it 2–0 from the third of these. Cambuslang soon returned to the attack and Hugh Gourlay halved the lead out of a "brief" scrimmage close to half-time.

M'Nee restored the two-goal margin with a "long swift shot" almost immediately after the re-start, before Cambuslang took control once more, creating a number of chances, and coming close to making the score 3–2 until a foul was given against them while trying to scrimmage the ball into the goal; straight from the free-kick Renton made the game safe at 4–1. For the last twenty minutes, Renton toyed with a tired Cambuslang side, repeatedly creating chances but mostly missing them.

The margin of victory stood as a Scottish Cup Final record outright until being matched in 1972, but has never been surpassed.

== Aftermath ==
Three months later the same teams contested the final of the Glasgow Merchants Charity Cup at the same venue, Renton again winning by a 4–0 scoreline for what was their third of four successive victories in that competition. A week after that, they became unofficial "World Champions" after challenging and defeating FA Cup holders West Bromwich Albion.

== Summary ==
4 February 1888

Cambuslang	1 – 6	Renton
H. Gourlay	Report	J. McCall; McCallum; McNee

Hampden Park
Attendance: 15,000
Referee: A. Kennedy

Cambuslang	Renton

=== Teams ===
Cambuslang:
GK	James Dunn
FB	William Smith
FB	William Semple
HB	McKay
HB	James 'White' Gourlay
HB	Andrew Jackson
FW	John Buchanan
FW	James Buchanan
FW	James Plenderleith
FW	Hugh Gourlay
FW	James Gourlay

Renton:
GK	John Lindsay
FB	Andrew Hannah
FB	Archie McCall
HB	Bob Kelso
HB	James Kelly
HB	Donald McKechnie
FW	Neil McCallum
FW	Harry Campbell
FW	Johnny Campbell
FW	James McCall
FW	Jack McNee

== See also ==
- 1887–88 Scottish Cup
