= 1885–86 in Scottish football =

Football in Scotland
- Season: 1885–86

1885–86 in Scottish football

Scottish Cup winners
- Queen's Park

Scotland national team
- 1886 BHC

The 1885–86 season was the 13th season of competitive football in Scotland.

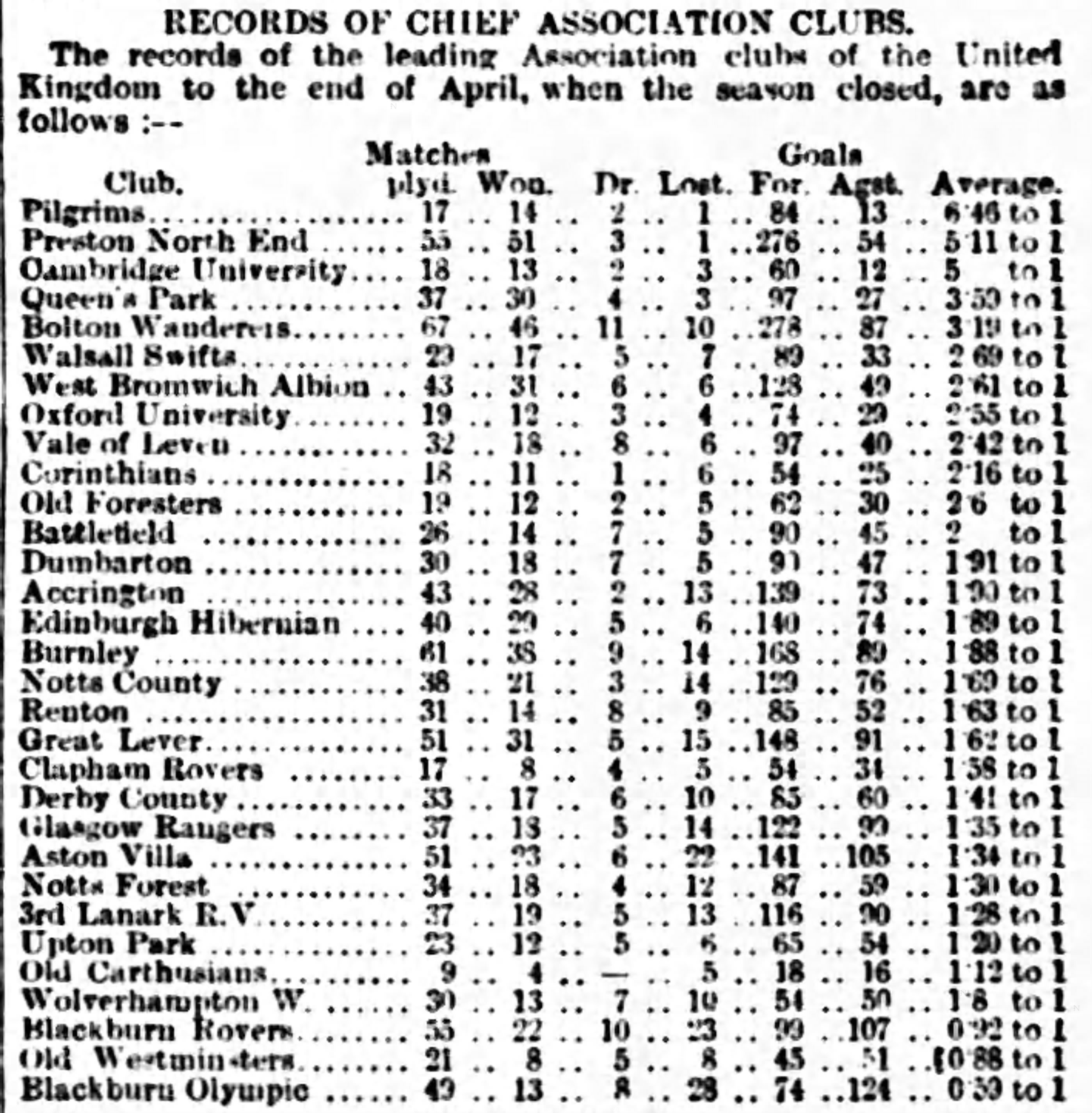
An early form of football league table, showing the leading clubs in England and Scotland, ranked by goal average, Newcastle Daily Chronicle, 13 May 1886

== Honours ==
=== Cup honours ===
==== National ====
Competition	Winner	Score	Runner-up
Scottish Cup	Queen's Park	3 – 1	Renton

==== County ====
Competition	Winner	Score	Runner-up
Ayrshire Cup	Kilmarnock	2 – 1	Ayr
Buteshire Cup	Cumbrae	3 – 0	Bute Rangers
Dumbartonshire Cup	Vale of Leven	2 – 1 (Note: Replay needed.)	Dumbarton Athletic
East of Scotland Shield	Hibernian	5 – 1	St Bernard's
Fife Cup	Alloa Athletic	4 – 0	Cowdenbeath
Forfarshire Cup	Dundee Harp	5 – 3	Arbroath
Lanarkshire Cup	Airdrie	5 – 1	Cambuslang
Linlithgowshire Cup	Armadale	2 – 1	Broxburn Shamrock
Perthshire Cup	Dunblane	3 – 2	Coupar Angus
Renfrewshire Cup	Abercorn	4 – 0	Port Glasgow Athletic
Stirlingshire Cup	East Stirlingshire	3 – 1	King's Park

==== Other ====
Competition	Winner	Score	Runner-up
Glasgow Charity Cup	Renton	3–1	Vale of Leven

== Teams in F.A. Cup ==
Season	Club	Round	Opponent	Result
1885–86	Heart of Midlothian	1st round	(England) Padiham	Withdrew
1885–86	Partick Thistle	1st round	Queen's Park	1 – 5
1885–86	Queen's Park	1st round	Partick Thistle	5 – 1
1885–86	Queen's Park	2nd round	(England) South Shore	Withdrew
1885–86	Rangers	1st round	(England) Rawtenstall	Withdrew
1885–86	Third Lanark	1st round	(England) Blackburn Park Road	4 – 2
1885–86	Third Lanark	2nd round	(England) Church	Withdrew

== Scotland national team ==
Date	Venue	Opponents	Score (Note: Scotland's score is shown first.)	Competition	Scotland scorers
20 March 1886	Ulster Cricket Ground, Belfast	Ireland	7–2	British Home Championship	Charles Heggie (4), John Lambie, Michael Dunbar, James Gourlay
27 March 1886	Hampden Park, Glasgow	England	1–1	British Home Championship	George Somerville
10 April 1886	Hampden Park, Glasgow	Wales	4–1	British Home Championship	Bob McCormick, James McCall, David Allan, William Harrower

Pos	Team	Pld	W	D	L	GF	GA	GD	Pts
1	Scotland (C)	3	2	1	0	12	4	+8	5
2	England (C)	3	2	1	0	10	3	+7	5
3	Wales	3	1	0	2	7	7	0	2
4	Ireland	3	0	0	3	3	18	−15	0

Rules for classification: 1) Points. The points system worked as follows: 2 points for a win and 1 point for a draw.
(C) Joint champions
