= 1886 Scottish Cup final =

- Event: 1885–86 Scottish Cup
Queen's Park	Renton
3	1
- Date: 13 February 1886
- Venue: Cathkin Park, Crosshill
- Referee: J. E. McKillop (Cartvale)
- Attendance: 7,000

The 1886 Scottish Cup final was the 13th final of the Scottish Cup and the final of the 1885–86 Scottish Cup, the most prestigious knockout football competition in Scotland. The match was played at Cathkin Park in Crosshill (today part of Glasgow) on 13 February 1886, and was watched by a crowd of "between 7,000 and 8,000", "between 8,000 and 9,000", or "not less than 9,000", or 10,000 spectators. The final was contested by defending champions Renton and seven-time winners Queen's Park.

This was the first Scottish Cup final since 1880 to be decided without the need for a replay (excluding the 1884 final which went unplayed).

== Background ==
Queen's Park had reached the final on seven previous occasions and had gone on to win the competition on each occasion. This was the fifth time in seven seasons which Queen's Park had reached the final.

Defending champions Renton had previously reached the final only twice, winning the trophy in 1885, ten years after finishing as runners-up.

Renton and Queen's Park had previously played twice in the Scottish Cup, although they had not been drawn together for over a decade. Renton had not scored a goal against Queen's Park before the 1886 final with the Glasgow side winning 3–0 in the 1875 final and 2–0 in the 1874 semi-finals.

== Route to the final ==
=== Queen's Park ===
Round	Opposition	Score
First round	St Peter's	16–0
Second round	Pilgrims	1–0
Third round	East Stirlingshire	3–0
Fourth round	Airdrieonians	1–0
Fifth round	Arthurlie	2–1
Quarter-final	bye	
Semi-final	3rd Lanark RV	3–0

=== Renton ===
Round	Opposition	Score
First round	Kirkintilloch Athletic	15–0
Second round	Dumbarton Athletic	7–2
Third round	Albion	1–0
Fourth round	Cowlairs	4–0
Fifth round	Vale of Leven	2–2
Fifth round replay	Vale of Leven	3–0
Quarter-final	bye	
Semi-final	Hibernian	2–0

== Report ==
The first quarter of the game was played in heavy rain. Queen's Park, who had the benefit of a wind behind them in the first half, took the lead early on when Somerville turned home a Hamilton shot that had been blocked by Hannah. (Note: This is the report from two newspapers; the Lennox Herald credits the goal to Lambie, the Glasgow Herald to Hamilton.) Renton came close to an equalizer shortly before half-time when Gillespie caught a shot from McCall and was nearly driven over the line in the resulting maul.

A quarter of an hour into the second half, following Renton pressure, Kelso drove a free-kick through a crowd of players to make the score 1-1; as direct free-kicks did not exist, Queen's Park protested the goal, but the referee deemed that there had been a touch on the way through. A short while afterwards, Christie injured his foot, and was a passenger for the rest of the match, having to leave the pitch for a while; Renton pressed home with a man advantage, but could not score, and, following a break after 70 minutes, Harrower scored from a Hamilton cross. Near the end Queen's Park made it three from a 'scrimmage', which was credited to Somerville, (Note: The Lennox Herald credits the goal to Christie, the Glasgow Herald to Somerville) after a move involving Hamilton and Harrower.

== Match details ==
13 February 1886
15:00

Queen's Park	3–1	Renton
Somerville 10', 85'; Harrower 70'	Report	Kelso 60'

Cathkin Park
Attendance: 7,000-10,000
Referee: J. E. McKillop (Cartvale)

QUEEN'S PARK:
GK	George Gillespie
FB	Walter Arnott
FB	Andrew Watson
HB	Charles Campbell
HB	John J. Gow
LW	Robert Christie
LW	David Allan
FW	George Somerville
FW	William Harrower
RW	Alexander Hamilton
RW	John Lambie

RENTON:
GK	John Lindsay
FB	Andrew Hannah
FB	Archie McCall
HB	Bob Kelso
HB	Donald McKechnie
RW	Alexander Barbour
RW	James Kelly
FW	Alec Grant
FW	J. McIntyre
LW	James McCall
LW	J. Thomson

== Aftermath ==
Renton gained a measure of revenge at the end of the season, beating Queen's Park 5–2 in the semi-final of the Glasgow Charity Cup, a prestige tournament for four invited clubs; Renton beat local rivals Vale of Leven in the final.
