= 1888 World Championship (football) =

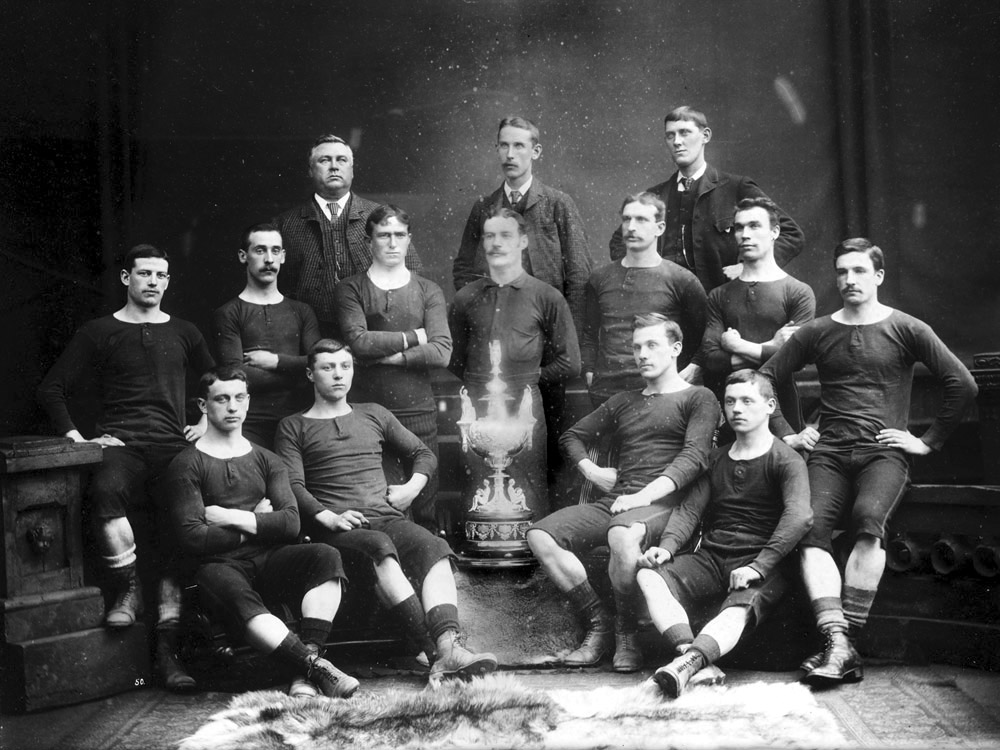
- Renton team, winning side
- Event: Football World Championship
Renton	West Bromwich Albion
(Scotland)	(England)
4	1
- Date: 19 May 1888
- Venue: Hampden Park, Crosshill
- Attendance: 6,000
- Weather: Thunderstorm

The 1888 World Championship was an exhibition football match that took place in Crosshill (today part of Glasgow), Scotland, on 19 May 1888 between the winners of the Scottish Cup, Renton, and the English FA Cup, West Bromwich Albion. The match was won by Renton who beat Albion 4–1. The match was played in very bad weather and a replay in England was proposed, but never took place.

== Overview ==
This was not the first "World Championship" game between English and Scottish sides; however, the next edition was the first such club competition contested between national league winners (as the leagues had not been yet created before that time). Johnny Campbell, who played for Renton in this fixture, would also win a world championship with Sunderland in 1895; he is therefore the first known British footballer to have been twice listed as a world champion with different clubs.

It was noted in the press that West Brom were "one of the English clubs which have never had a Scotchman either as a coach or a player" and the match were therefore seen as a truly international event – by this point may of the leading English clubs (which were allowed to become professional in 1885) had Scottish players, and in the aforementioned Sunderland v Hearts match in 1895 both entrants had an all-Scottish line-up.

Renton's win was something of a watershed for Scottish football, as within a few days James Kelly and Neil McCallum had left to join the newly-formed Celtic and quickly helped to establish them as a force in the game, Meanwhile Renton soon lost several other members of their 'world champion' team to professional clubs in England (including Andrew Hannah who moved to West Brom after he impressed them in the Glasgow match) and gradually declined, never returning to the same level.

== Participant teams ==
Team	Qualification
(England) West Bromwich Albion	1887–88 FA Cup winners
(Scotland) Renton	1887–88 Scottish Cup winners

== Match details ==
19 May 1888

Renton (Scotland)	4–1	(England) West Bromwich Albion
McNee; J. McCall; H. Campbell	Report	Pearson

Hampden Park, Crosshill
Attendance: 6,000
Referee: (Ireland) J. Sinclair

Renton	West Bromwich; Albion

=== Teams ===
Renton:
GK	(Scotland) John Lindsay
FB	(Scotland) Andrew Hannah
FB	(Scotland) Archie McCall
HB	(Scotland) Bob Kelso
HB	(Scotland) James Kelly
HB	(Scotland) Donald McKechnie
FW	(Scotland) Harry Campbell
FW	(Scotland) James McCall
FW	(Scotland) Johnny Campbell
FW	(Scotland) Neil McCallum
FW	(Scotland) Jack McNee

West Bromwich Albion:
GK
(England) Bob Roberts
FB
(England) Charlie Mason (Note: Guest player from Wolverhampton Wanderers.)
FB
(England) Harry Green
HB
(England) Ezra Horton
HB
(England) Charlie Perry
HB
(England) George Timmins
FW
(England) Billy Bassett
FW
(England) George Woodhall
FW
(England) Jem Bayliss (c)
FW
(England) Joe Wilson
FW
(England) Tom Pearson
