= 1885 Scottish Cup final =

- Event: 1884–85 Scottish Cup
Renton	Vale of Leven
0	0
- Date: 21 February 1885
- Venue: Hampden Park, Crosshill
- Attendance: 3,000

Replay
Renton	Vale of Leven
3	1
- Date: 28 February 1885
- Venue: Hampden Park, Crosshill
- Attendance: 5,000

The 1885 Scottish Cup final was the 12th final of the Scottish Cup and the final of the 1884–85 Scottish Cup, the most prestigious knockout football competition in Scotland. For only the second time in the competition's history, the final was contested by two teams from outside Glasgow: Renton, who had never won the cup before, and three-time winners Vale of Leven, representing neighbouring communities in Dunbartonshire (their home grounds were approximately 1.6 miles (2.6 km) apart).

The original match - which ended in a 0–0 draw - was played at the second Hampden Park in Crosshill (today part of Glasgow) on 21 February 1885 and was watched by a crowd of 3,000 spectators. The replay took place at the same venue on 28 February 1885 in front of 5,000 spectators. Renton won the competition for the first time after they beat Vale of Leven 3–1.

This was the first Scottish Cup final to be held at the second Hampden Park.

== Background ==
Vale of Leven had reached the final on four previous occasions, winning the trophy for three consecutive seasons between 1877 and 1879. They had reached the final for the third season in succession however, they never appeared for the previous final in protest after the SFA had refused to postpone the match. Prior to 1885, no team had reached the final for three successive seasons without lifting the trophy at least once.

Renton had only previously reached the final once before 10 years earlier when they lost 3–0 to Queen's Park

As the earlier rounds of the Scottish Cup were regionalised at the time, Dunbartonshire neighbours Renton and Vale of Leven had previously met three times in the competition with Vale of Leven progressing each time.

== Route to the final ==
=== Renton ===
Round	Opposition	Score
First round	Vale of Leven Wanderers	2–1
Second round	East Stirlingshire	10–2
Third round	Northern	9–2
Fourth round	St Mirren	2–1
Fifth round	bye	
Quarter-final	Rangers	5–3
Semi-final	Hibernian	3–2

=== Vale of Leven ===
Round	Opposition	Score
First round	Jamestown	1–1
First round replay	Jamestown	4–1
Second round	Campsie Central	14–0
Third round	Yoker	4–1
Fourth round	Arthurlie	2–1
Fifth round	bye	
Quarter-final	Thornliebank	4–3
Semi-final	Cambuslang	0–0
Semi-final replay	Cambuslang	3–1

== Match details ==
=== Original ===
==== Report ====
The Vale suffered a blow before the match when captain McPherson was rendered hors de combat, R. Wilson of the 2nd XI taking his place at half-back. The Scottish FA had still not learned that playing the Cup final in winter was not conducive to good football, and, after a series of frosts had rendered Hampden Park hard and rutted, the players also had to contend with a "perfect gale". Vale of Leven won the toss, and, contrary to accepted wisdom, kicked into the wind, and played defensively, showing "that the Vale meant to reserve themselves for the second half". Renton failed to take advantage; the closest it came to scoring was when a M'Coll shot passed over Abraham's foot and struck the right-hand post.

The Vale had five corners in the second half, but could not break through a plucky Renton side, which pulled five players into the back division for the half. Vale's centre-forward pairing of Johnstone and Ferguson received particular criticism for their ineffectiveness. Renton's lighter, nimbler forwards were praised for better passing when facing the wind than the more lumpen football of the Vale.

After the match, one of the Vale supporters, James McCulloch, aged about 34, fell into an unprotected boiling water tank at Queen Street Station in Glasgow, and died of his injuries the next day.

21 February 1885
15:00

Renton	0–0	Vale of Leven
	Report

Hampden Park, Crosshill
Attendance: 3,000
Referee: J. E. M'Killop (Cartvale)

RENTON:
GK	John Lindsay
FB	Andrew Hannah
FB	Archie McCall
HB	Bob Kelso
HB	Donald McKechnie
FW	Alexander Barbour
FW	James Kelly
FW	A. McIntyre
FW	James McCall
FW	Grant
FW	Thomson
Team unchanged for replay.

VALE OF LEVEN:
GK	James Wilson
FB	Andrew McIntyre
FB	John Forbes
HB	J. Abraham
HB	R. Wilson
RW	J. Galloway
RW	D. McIntyre
FW	John Ferguson
FW	W. H. Johnstone
LW	M. D. Gillies
LW	D. Kennedy
For the replay, McPherson replaced J. Wilson.

=== Replay ===
==== Report ====
The weather for the replay was much more favourable, and McPherson, fit again, replaced Wilson in the Vale line-up. The crowd, estimated between 5,000 and 7,000, was made up mostly of Dunbartonshire locals, and the bulk of support was behind Renton. Despite the return of the Vale captain, Renton dominated most of the match, Vale reliant on breaks to put any pressure on, only Galloway of the Vale causing any difficulties for Renton, for whom Kelso and McKechnie "played magnificently". The game also had an early instance of gamesmanship, as Abraham placed a ball for a free-kick near the Renton goal, and a Renton forward kicked it into touch to give his side more time to pack the goal area.

After a scoreless first-half, Renton took the lead after about 65 minutes, after some clever passing gave McColl a chance before the posts, aided by a slip from Wilson in the Vale goal. A few minutes later Vale had its best change, Ferguson hitting the post, but after 80 minutes a "well-planned attack" from McIntyre, McCall, and Kelly, resulted in McIntyre doubling Renton's lead. With the Vale side throwing men forward, Renton broke away with three minutes to go, and McIntyre added a third, the goal surviving an appeal "not without good grounds" for offside, and the only Vale goal came from a scrimmage almost on the whistle, when some of the Renton supporters had already left the ground.

After the telegraph confirming the victory arrived at Renton Post Office, the joyous villagers lit a huge bonfire on Carman Hill, and assembled at the station, the Renton Brass Band playing "See, The Conquering Hero Comes". The players were taken by waggonette to Cordale House, to be congratulated by club patron Alexander Wylie, and "up to a late hour" fireworks, squibs, rockets, fog-signals, and even a gun were let off.

28 February 1885
15:00

Renton	3–1	Vale of Leven
A. McCall 65'; A. McIntyre 80' 87'	Report	"scrimmage" 90'

Hampden Park
Attendance: 5-7,000
