= George Campbell (footballer, born 1864) =

Scottish footballer

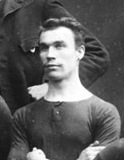

Personal information
- Full name: George Campbell
- Date of birth: 1 December 1864
- Place of birth: Cardross, Scotland
- Date of death: 4 April 1898 (aged 33)
- Place of death: Kirkcaldy, Scotland
- Positions: Half back; left back

Senior career*
Years	Team	Apps	(Gls)
1888–1890	Renton	5	(0)
1890–1893	Aston Villa	51	(2)
1893–1895	Dundee	18	(0)
- * Club domestic league appearances and goals

George Campbell (1 December 1864 – 4 April 1898) was a Scottish footballer who played in the Football League for Aston Villa.

== Career ==
Campbell began his senior career with local club Renton, who had become established as one of Scotland's leading teams (at that time there were two other Campbells in the line-up, Johnny and Harry, but none of the three men were related). He came into the side at half back after several key players moved on in the wake of Renton's Scottish Cup and unofficial 'World Championship' wins in 1888. The replacements also performed strongly, winning a Glasgow Merchants Charity Cup and being invited to join the Scottish Football League in its first season of 1890–91, only for the Dunbartonshire club and its players to be expelled from the then-amateur competition for matters relating to professionalism. On a personal level, Campbell was invited to a trial for the Scotland national team in March 1890, but did not go further in the selection process after some players absent from the trials became available again.

After Renton's expulsion, Campbell soon signed for English Football League club Aston Villa along with former teammate Jimmy Brown; at the time of the 1891 census the pair were lodging together in Birmingham along with Jimmy Cowan who had come from the same district in Scotland. While Cowan went on to great success with Villa, Campbell and Brown remained on the fringes of the team – neither played in the 1892 FA Cup Final, and both left the club and went their separate ways during 1893 (Brown joined Leicester Fosse).

Campbell transferred back to Scotland with Dundee, playing in their first-ever season after a merger of two older clubs (prompted by the eventual legalisation of professional contracts in the SFL, with larger clubs seen as more likely to prosper). He was appointed Dundee captain and remained there until the end of the 1894–95 season at which point he had to retire from the game due to ill health, which later led to his death in 1898.
