= Jimmy Brown (footballer, born 1869) =

English footballer

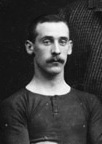

Personal information
- Full name: James Brown
- Date of birth: 17 June 1869
- Place of birth: Bonhill, Scotland
- Date of death: 11 January 1924 (aged 54)
- Place of death: Leicester, England
- Positions: Centre half; centre forward

Senior career*
Years	Team	Apps	(Gls)
- Renton Union
- Renton Thistle
1888–1890	Renton	5	(0)
1890–1893	Aston Villa	52	(3)
1893–1899	Leicester Fosse	130	(18)
1899–1900	Loughborough		
- * Club domestic league appearances and goals

James Brown (17 June 1869 – 11 January 1924) was a Scottish footballer who played in the Football League for Aston Villa and Leicester Fosse.

== Career ==
Brown began his senior career with local club Renton, who had become established as one of Scotland's leading teams – he came into the side at centre half to replace key man James Kelly who had moved on along with some others in the wake of Renton's Scottish Cup and unofficial 'World Championship' wins in 1888. The younger replacements also performed strongly, winning a Glasgow Merchants Charity Cup and being invited to join the Scottish Football League in its first season of 1890–91, only for the Dunbartonshire club and its players to be expelled from the competition for matters relating to professionalism.

Brown soon signed for English Football League club Aston Villa along with former Renton teammate George Campbell; at the time of the 1891 census the pair were lodging together in Birmingham along with Jimmy Cowan who had come from the same district in Scotland. While Cowan went on to great success with Villa, Campbell and Brown remained on the fringes of the team (neither played in the 1892 FA Cup Final), both leaving the club and going their separate ways during 1893 (Campbell joined Dundee).

Brown transferred to Leicester Fosse, initially members of the Midland League. In his first season he had a role as a forward and finished as the club's top goalscorer for the Leicester were then admitted to the Football League Second Division with Brown, now back in a more defensive role, featuring regularly over the next four seasons. Now in his 30s, in 1899 he joined Loughborough before his retiral from playing; he remained in the Leicester area with his family and worked as a tobacconist.
