= Jack McNee =

Scottish footballer

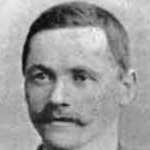

Personal information
- Full name: John McNee
- Date of birth: 30 March 1866
- Place of birth: Renton, Dunbartonshire, Scotland
- Position: Inside forward

Senior career*
Years	Team	Apps	(Gls)
- Renton Wanderers
1887–1889	Renton		
1889–1893	Bolton Wanderers	87	(23)
- Kingsland
1893–1894	Renton	12	(4)
1894–1895	Newcastle United	21	(4)
1895–1897	Gateshead N.E.R.		
1897–1900	Watford	62	(32)
1901	Southampton (trial)	0	(0)
1901	Fulham	4	(1)
- * Club domestic league appearances and goals

John McNee (born 30 March 1866) was a Scottish footballer. He played as an inside forward in both English and Scottish football.

== Career ==
Born in Renton, Dunbartonshire, McNee started his career in the village with Renton Wanderers. He later joined the village's stronger club, Renton F.C., scoring twice for them in their 6–1 win over Cambuslang in the 1888 Scottish Cup Final, and twice more in the unofficial Football World Championship match against West Bromwich Albion.

A year later he moved to England and played in the Football League for Bolton Wanderers (four seasons, including an FA Cup semi-final in 1890) and Newcastle United (one season, after a brief return to Renton), followed by two years with Gateshead N.E.R. in the Northern Alliance.

He joined Southern League side West Hertfordshire in October 1897; they subsequently renamed as Watford at the end of the season. McNee was a regular first-team player in his first season at the club, and ever-present in his second. In 1899–1900, McNee scored 20 goals in all competitions as Watford won both the Southern League Second Division and the Bucks and Contiguous Counties League. He left Watford at the end of the season.

In April 1901, he played one match for Southampton in the Wessex League, but was not offered a contract. In August 1901, he joined Fulham for their promotion season from Southern League Division Two.
