= John Forbes (footballer) =

Scottish footballer

Personal information
- Full name: John Forbes
- Date of birth: 13 January 1862
- Place of birth: Bonhill, Scotland
- Date of death: 31 January 1928 (aged 66)
- Position: Full-back

Senior career*
Years	Team	Apps	(Gls)
1878–1879	Star of Leven		
1879–1888	Vale of Leven		
1888–1894	Blackburn Rovers	106	(1)

International career
1884–1887	Scotland	5	(0)
- * Club domestic league appearances and goals

John Forbes (13 January 1862 – 31 January 1928) was a Scottish footballer who played in the English Football League for Blackburn Rovers.

== Club career ==
=== Vale of Leven ===
Forbes began his career as a forward with Star of Leven. In 1879 he joined Vale of Leven, again as a forward, but was quickly converted into a half-back and then full-back due to his pace. While playing for the Vale he appeared in two Scottish Cup Finals, in 1883 and 1885, but had the misfortune to be on the losing side to local rivals on both occasions. The 1883 final was played at the first Hampden Park on 31 March 1883 and the opposition was Dumbarton; it ended 2–2. In the replay, also at Hampden on 7 April, Dumbarton won 2–1. The 1885 final was played at the new, second Hampden on 21 February 1885 and the opposition was Renton; it ended 0–0. In the replay at the same venue on 28 February, Renton won 3–1.

Forbes would likely also have featured in the 1884 final but his mother died in the week of the match and the funeral was arranged for the same day as the final. The Scottish Football Association declined to alter the date of the game for this and other excusal reasons proposed by Vale of Leven, and as a result the club refused to participate in the match out of respect for Forbes and his family and forfeited the trophy to Queen's Park after a vote on the issue.

Forbes was a guest player for Rangers as they beat Lincoln City in the 1886–87 FA Cup Fifth Round. In March 1887 he was a member of the Rangers team that was beaten by Aston Villa in the FA Cup semi–final at Nantwich Road, Crewe.

=== Blackburn Rovers ===
Upon moving to English football, Forbes became an immediate favourite with the Blackburn fans. Playing as a full–back, he made his League debut on 13 October 1888 at Wellington Road, the then home of Aston Villa. The visitors lost 6–1. He appeared in 16 of the 22 League matches played by Blackburn in season 1888–89 and was part of a defence that achieved four clean–sheets. Forbes also played in all five FA Cup ties at full–back including the semi–final and semi–final replay against Wolverhampton Wanderers, the latter of which Rovers lost 3–1.

Forbes's playing career ended in 1894. He played in 127 first–class matches for Blackburn Rovers (106 in the Football League and 21 in the FA Cup) and scored twice, one in each of the major competitions. He played in five FA Cup semi-finals, winning three, and in two FA Cup Finals, both of which were won.

== International career ==
Forbes made his international debut on 26 January 1884 at the Ulster Cricket Ground, Belfast against Ireland; Scotland won 5–0. Forbes played in all three of the 1883–84 British Home Championship matches, Scotland winning all three and only conceding one goal. He returned to international duty in 1886–87, missing just one of three British Home Championship matches. His first international match that season was at Leamington Road, the then home of Blackburn Rovers. Scotland defeated England 3–2. Scotland also beat Wales in what was Forbes' last appearance (leaving him with a 100% record for his country) as within a year he had moved to England – at that time the SFA would not consider players based outside Scotland.

== Playing style ==
By the standards of his era, John Forbes was a cultured full-back, who relied on speed rather than power to overcome opponents. In an article in "The Scottish Referee" in March 1902, it was said of Forbes that in his youth, 'so fast was he that he lost command of the ball, over running it, and waiting for it to come to him, and not vice versa'. However, his gift of speed and natural athleticism led him to adopt a roving commission in the role and his critics castigated him for being 'all over the shop'. He was later converted into a right-back before being switched to the opposite flank. It was as a left–back that his talent blossomed to the extent that he was capped by Scotland.

His strengths as a player lay in his speed and in his ability to clear his lines, despite the fact that he was not the most powerful kicker of a football. His slight physique meant that he could not barge opponents off the ball, but had to use more subtle methods, which often involved reading the game and using his speed to intercept the ball before opponents could gain possession.
