= James Gourlay (disambiguation) =

James Gourlay is a British conductor.

James or Jimmy Gourlay may also refer to:

- James Gourlay (footballer, born 1860) (1860–1939), Scottish international footballer in 1888, father of Jimmy Gourlay
- James Gourlay (footballer, born 1862) (1862–1926), Scottish international footballer in 1886
- Jimmy Gourlay (1888–1970), Scottish footballer (Everton FC and Greenock Morton FC), son
