= John McNee =

John McNee may refer to:

- John McNee (diplomat), Canadian diplomat
- Sir John William McNee, British pathologist and bacteriologist
- Jack McNee (John McNee), Scottish footballer
