= Clydebank Football Club =

Clydebank Football Club may refer to:

- Clydebank F.C. (Rutherglen), an association football club which existed from 1874 to 1886, from Rutherglen in Lanarkshire
- Clydebank F.C. (1888), an association football club which existed from 1888 to 1895
- Clydebank F.C. (1899), an association football club which existed from 1899 to 1901
- Clydebank F.C. (1914), a Scottish League football club which existed from 1914 to 1931
- Clydebank F.C. (1965), a Scottish League football club which existed from 1965 to 2002, which ultimately became Airdrieonians F.C.
- Clydebank F.C., an association football club formed in 2003 to replace the 1965 club
