= Willie Hughes (footballer) =

Scottish footballer (1909–196)

Personal information
- Full name: William Hughes
- Date of birth: 7 July 1909
- Place of birth: Winchburgh, Scotland
- Date of death: 1 January 1996 (aged 86)
- Place of death: Bellshill, Scotland
- Height: 5 ft 10 in (1.78 m)
- Positions: Outside left; left half

Senior career*
Years	Team	Apps	(Gls)
–	Bellstane Birds		
1927–1929	Bathgate	69	(10)
1929–1936	Celtic	94	(12)
1929	→ Ayr United (loan)		
1936–1948	Clyde	57	(3)
1938	→ Bo'ness (loan)		
1938–1941	Arbroath	19	(4)
Total		244	(34)
- * Club domestic league appearances and goals

William Hughes (7 July 1909 – 1 January 1996) was a Scottish footballer who played mainly as an outside left, although he was a versatile player who could operate in several positions.

His longest spell was with Celtic where he made over 100 appearances in all competitions and spent seven seasons but was a regular starter only in one (1933–34), otherwise being seen as a squad member who could fill in for several roles. He was not selected for the club's two Scottish Cup finals during the period in 1931 and 1933 despite playing in earlier rounds, and only made four appearances when they won the Scottish Football League in 1935–36, so it is unlikely that he received a winner's medal from a major competition.

He began his league career with Bathgate, departing when the club went defunct, and after leaving Celtic played for Clyde and Arbroath, in a more defensive role than in his early career. During World War II he featured for Hamilton Academical, later joining the club's coaching staff.

Originally from West Lothian, Hughes settled in Blantyre, South Lanarkshire; his first marriage was to Bridie Kelly, daughter of James Kelly and sister of Bob Kelly, both of whom served as chairman of Celtic.
