= Bob Kelso (footballer) =

Scottish footballer

Personal information
- Full name: Robert Robison Kelso
- Date of birth: 2 October 1865
- Place of birth: Cardross, Dunbartonshire, Scotland
- Date of death: 19 November 1950 (aged 85)
- Place of death: Dumbarton, Scotland
- Position: Half back

Senior career*
Years	Team	Apps	(Gls)
1886–1888	Renton		
1888	Newcastle West End		
1888–1889	Everton	1	(0)
1889–1891	Preston North End	38	(0)
1891–1896	Everton	88	(5)
1896–1898	Dundee	33	(1)
1898	Bedminster	20	(1)

International career
1885–1898	Scotland	7	(0)
1898	Scottish League XI	1	(0)
- * Club domestic league appearances and goals

Robert Robison Kelso (2 October 1865 – 19 November 1950) was a Scottish footballer who played for Renton, Newcastle West End, Preston North End, Everton, Dundee, Bedminster and the Scotland national team.

== Career ==
Kelso was born in Cardross, Dunbartonshire, and began his football career with Renton where he won the Scottish Cup in 1885 and 1888 and played on the losing side in the 1886 final. He also won the Champions of the World title in 1888 when Scottish Cup holders Renton defeated English FA Cup holders West Bromwich Albion.

He moved to Newcastle West End in 1888 and then to Everton the following year. He made his Everton and Football League debut on 19 January 1889 at Anfield, Liverpool against "The Invincibles", Preston North End. John Weir, the Everton right-half was injured and so Kelso got his chance to play. In front of 15,000 fans Everton played well but Preston scored two late goals and looked the better side at the end of the game. Kelso must have made a good impression on his opponents as he left Anfield for Deepdale in May 1889.

With Preston he won the English league championship in 1889–90 before moving back to Everton in 1891 where he played in the 1893 FA Cup Final. He returned to his native Scotland in 1896 with Dundee, where he made 40 total appearances with 2 goals and earned selection for the Scottish League representative team, before ending his career with a brief spell in the Southern League at Bedminster in 1898–99.

He won seven caps for Scotland, making his debut in an 8–2 win over Ireland on 14 March 1885. He captained his country in his final Scotland appearance, a 3–0 win over Ireland on 26 March 1898.

Kelso was described as a player who was difficult to get past, caught the eye with his powerful and timely tackling, and was always clearing the ball well while specialising in long-range dipping shots at goal.

== Personal life ==
His nephew, Tommy Kelso, was also a Scotland international footballer, who played for Manchester City, Dundee and Rangers. Bob's brother James Kelso played for Renton, and once appeared for Liverpool.

== Professional baseball ==
Kelso played baseball professionally as a shot stop for Preston North End Baseball Club in the 1890 National League of Baseball of Great Britain, but spent much of the season with the amateur team.

== See also ==
- List of Scotland national football team captains
- List of Scottish football families
