= Sandy Kennedy =

Scottish footballer

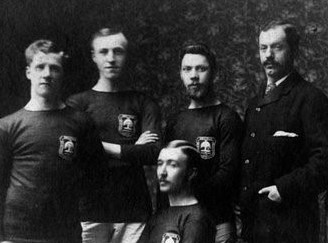
Kennedy (standing 3rd left) with other members of the Glasgow select team in 1880

Alexander "Sandy" Kennedy (13 March 1853 – 26 December 1944) was a Scottish footballer, who played for Eastern, Third Lanark and Scotland.

== Birth and Death ==
Kennedy was born in Dalquhurn on 13 March 1853 and died on Boxing Day 1944 at the age of 91.
