= James Gourlay (footballer, born 1860) =

Scottish footballer

Personal information
- Full name: James McCrorie Gourlay
- Date of birth: 1 November 1860
- Place of birth: Annbank, Scotland
- Date of death: 3 October 1939 (aged 78)
- Place of death: Annbank, Scotland
- Positions: Half back; forward

Senior career*
Years	Team	Apps	(Gls)
- Cambuslang
- Annbank

International career
1888	Scotland	1	(0)
- * Club domestic league appearances and goals

James McCrorie Gourlay (1 November 1860 – 10 March 1939) was a Scottish footballer who played as a half back or forward.

== Career ==
Born in Annbank, Gourlay played club football for Cambuslang (playing for them in the 1888 Scottish Cup Final alongside his cousin Hugh, who scored their side's goal) and Annbank (being part of his hometown team's run to the quarter-finals of the 1891–92 Scottish Cup), and made one appearance for Scotland against Wales in 1888. He is often confused with another James Gourlay, also a Cambuslang player, who was capped for Scotland in 1886.

His son Jimmy was also a footballer, who scored the winning goal in the 1922 Scottish Cup Final; his descendants include the lawn bowls champions David Gourlay Sr. and David Gourlay Jr.
