= Michael Kelly (Scottish politician) =

Scottish Labour politician and businessman (born 1940)

- Born: November 1, 1940 (age 85)
- Education: University of Strathclyde
- Occupations: Politician, businessman, writer, PR consultant
- Known for: "Glasgow's miles better" campaign; longtime Celtic F.C. board member (descendant of James Kelly, Celtic's first captain)
- Political party: Scottish Labour

Michael Kelly CBE (born 1 November 1940) is a Scottish Labour politician and businessman. He graduated from the University of Strathclyde and became a lecturer in economics there and a Labour councillor. From 1984 he was managing director of Michael Kelly Associates, a PR company. He held the position of Lord Provost of Glasgow from 1980 to 1984, and was Rector of the University of Glasgow from 1984 to 1987. As Lord Provost, he was instrumental in the city's adoption of the Glasgow's miles better campaign and slogan, which is credited with an important role in Glasgow's cultural renaissance during the 1980s. A member of one of the families that had controlled Celtic F.C. since its foundation, he sat on the club's board of directors until 1994, when the club reached the verge of bankruptcy and the much-criticised old regime was ousted by Fergus McCann's takeover.

He is a descendant of James Kelly, Celtic's first ever captain.

Kelly is now a writer and PR consultant.

Academic offices
Preceded by Reginald Bosanquet	Rector of the University of Glasgow; 1984–1987	Succeeded by Winnie Madikizela-Mandela
