= 1874–75 in Scottish football =

Football in Scotland
- Season: 1874–75

1874–75 in Scottish football

Scottish Cup winners
- Queen's Park

Season 1874–75 in Scottish football saw the Scottish Cup being contested for the second time.

== Overview ==
After its successful introduction the previous season, the Scottish Cup was again competed for, with Queen's Park once again lifting the trophy. For the second season running, Queen's contented themselves with the domestic tournament, declining to enter the FA Cup.

International competition was once again restricted to the annual clash with England, while the Glasgow v Sheffield representative fixture was played in Scotland for the first time.

== Scottish Cup ==
There was a modest expansion in the competition in its second season, which attracted 25 entrants – up from 16 for the previous season. There was geographic expansion too, with the 3rd Edinburgh Rifle Volunteers team becoming the first team from the east of the country to participate.

Holders Queen's Park once again lifted the trophy, defeating Western and West End in the early rounds, then progressing to the semi-finals when opponents Rovers withdrew. The semi-final, against the previous season's runners-up, Clydesdale, took three games to settle with Queen's finally winning 1–0 at Kinning Park following 0–0 and 2–2 draws. Renton, meanwhile had defeated their local rivals Dumbarton in their own replayed tie.

The final saw Queen's Park comfortably run out 3–0 winners. The crowd, estimated at 7,000, reflected the growing interest in football as it was almost three times the number that had attended the previous year.

== Scotland national team ==
The 1875 international saw Scotland visiting London for a second time, on this occasion returning with a draw.

Date	Venue	Opponents	Score	Competition	Scotland scorer(s)
6 March 1875	Kennington Oval, London	England	2–2	Friendly	Henry McNeil, Peter Andrews

== Representative matches ==
27 February 1875: (Scotland) Glasgow 2 (England) Sheffield 0 (Hamilton Crescent, Partick)

== Notes and references ==
- Smailes, Gordon (1995). The Breedon Book of Scottish Football Records. Derby: Breedon Books. ISBN 1-85983-020-X.
