= Glasgow's miles better =

1980s advertising campaign

The Glasgow's miles better logo

Glasgow's miles better was a 1980s campaign to promote the city of Glasgow as a tourist destination and as a location for industry. It was developed by Scottish advertising agency Struthers Advertising, and featured the phrase "Glasgow's Miles Better" wrapped around the cartoon figure of Mr. Happy. It is regarded as one of the world's earliest and most successful attempts to rebrand a city, and received a number of domestic and international awards.

== Background ==
In 1982, Struthers Advertising had undertaken an anti-smoking campaign for the Scottish Health Education Group featuring members of the Scotland national football team under the theme "The squad don't smoke". Later that year, the then Lord Provost of Glasgow Michael Kelly announced plans to make Glasgow a no smoking city by the year 2000. John Struthers wrote to Michael Kelly offering assistance with the No Smoking aim. The Lord Provost said he was simply the figurehead for the No Smoking group but he and John Struthers met over coffee. During that meeting, the Lord Provost said how much he wanted a campaign for Glasgow similar to the highly successful I Love New York campaign, but the City had no money to fund such an initiative.

As a result of that meeting, John Struthers undertook not only to create but also initially fund the development of a campaign capable of meeting the Lord Provost's objectives. Various concepts were developed and rejected, but in March 1983 Struthers presented the Glasgow's Miles Better proposal to Kelly supported with a fund raising strategy. The Lord Provost loved the whole concept and personally took it on board. Struthers and Kelly made a formidable combination that gave the whole campaign an impetus hitherto unseen in UK civic marketing activity. The campaign was launched in June 1983 by the Lord Provost to media attention and comment.

Some £100,000 was raised as a result of the Struthers fund raising proposals followed by the Scottish Development Agency (now Scottish Enterprise) agreeing to match this sum pound for pound. The reason for their contribution was due to a report they had commissioned, part of which suggested that the City of Glasgow would derive significant economic benefits from increased external marketing activity. When this funding was put in place, the City of Glasgow finally decided to offer financial support from their Common Good Fund amounting to some £60,000.

The campaign ran across UK media and was supported by extensive PR initiatives. One of the PR stories concerned Edinburgh. One of the Struthers recommendations was to target tourists during the Edinburgh Festival, so a modest campaign was booked to run on the sides of six Edinburgh buses. In the 1980s, Edinburgh buses were owned by Edinburgh Council, which took umbrage at the thought of Glasgow being promoted on their buses, and as a result, they banned the campaign. Within days, the story of Edinburgh banning Glasgow had gone worldwide and even made the front page of the Wall Street Journal.

Glasgow had previously suffered from a reputation as a hard-drinking, gang-ridden, working-class city. The campaign initially targeted the citizens of Glasgow and encouraged them to support the activity which focused on the cultural richness of Glasgow, its environment (more parkland per capita than any other city in Europe), its mild climate and its suitability for enterprise.

The result was a very significant change in the way Glasgow was perceived externally, and the figure of Mr. Happy from the Mr. Men children's books appeared on posters and badges alongside the slogan. In analysing the campaign, Brown, Moran and Gaudin (2013) suggest it "is considered to be one of the best city promotions ever mounted by any British city. It put a smile on a city that was both down on its heels and negatively perceived."

John Struthers was the man credited with devising the "Glasgow's Miles Better" campaign.

In later phases of the campaign, the catch-phrase was adapted in a number of ways, such as "Glasgow smiles better".

Edinburgh apparently responded to the campaign with a billboard and banner advertising campaign bearing the slogan, "Edinburgh: Count Me In".
