= Tontine Park =

Former football ground in Renton, Scotland

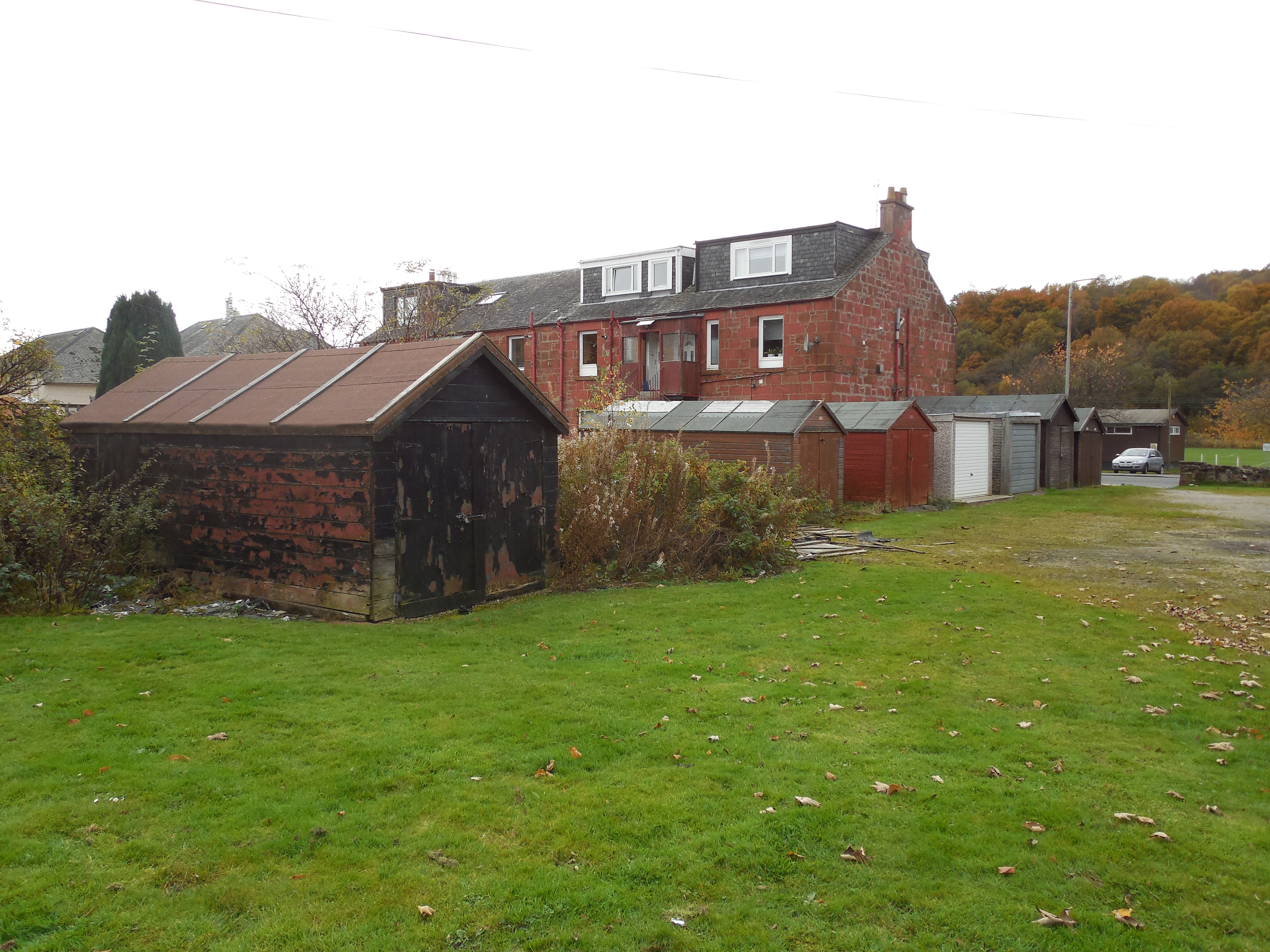

- Location within West Dunbartonshire
- Location: Renton, Scotland
- Coordinates: 55.9657°N 4.5824°W
- Surface: Grass

Construction
- Opened: 1878
- Closed: 1922
- Demolished: 1928

Tenant
- Renton F.C. (1878–1922)

Tontine Park was a football ground in Renton, West Dunbartonshire, Scotland. It was the home ground of Renton F.C. from 1878 until 1922, including their time in the Scottish Football League.

== History ==
Renton moved to Tontine Park from South Park in 1878. There were no stands at the ground, only a pavilion on the north-western corner of the pitch.

Renton were founder members of the Scottish Football League in 1890, and the first league match was played at Tontine Park on 23 August 1890 with Renton drawing 2–2 with St Mirren; however, the club were expelled from the league later in the season after playing an unauthorised friendly against 'Edinburgh Saints', a nom de plume for St Bernard's, a team who had been suspended by the Scottish FA for paying their players, against the rules at the time.

Renton were re-instated in season 1891–92, and reached the semi-finals of the Scottish Cup competition, hosting Queen's Park at Tontine Park in February 1892, a match in front of a 10,000 crowd which was drawn 1–1 and which saw the temporary trestle stand on the east side of the ground collapse, breaking one person's leg. Queen's Park won the replay a fortnight later.

A few weeks into the 1897–98 season, Renton again resigned from the league. The last SFL match was played at Tontine Park on 16 October 1897, a 3–1 defeat to Leith Athletic.

After the club folded in 1922 the site was used for housing, with Archie McCall, one of the heroes of the 1880s, among the builders involved on the project.
