= Harry Campbell (footballer, born 1867) =

Scottish footballer

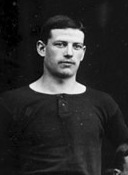

Personal information
- Full name: Henry Campbell
- Date of birth: 6 June 1867
- Place of birth: Renton, Scotland
- Date of death: 15 November 1915 (aged 48)
- Place of death: Blackburn, England
- Height: 5 ft 7 1/2 in (1.71 m)
- Position: Inside right

Youth career
- Renton Athletic
- 1885–1886: Renton Thistle

Senior career*
Years	Team	Apps	(Gls)
1886–1889	Renton		
1889–1893	Blackburn Rovers	98	(22)

International career
1889	Scotland	1	(0)
- * Club domestic league appearances and goals

Henry Campbell (6 June 1867 – 15 November 1915) was a Scottish footballer who played in the Football League for Blackburn Rovers. He was the first man to win both the Scottish Cup (in 1888 with hometown club Renton, where he also won the unofficial 'World Championship' and two Glasgow Merchants Charity Cups) and the English FA Cup (in 1890 with Blackburn).

Campbell played once for Scotland in 1889, a short time before his move to Lancashire along with compatriots Geordie Dewar and Tom Brandon in a Rovers recruitment drive north of the border (this meant they would not be selected by Scotland, a situation which did not change until 1896). He missed out on a possible second FA Cup medal in 1891 due to contracting pneumonia.
