= Neil McCallum (footballer, born 1868) =

Scottish footballer

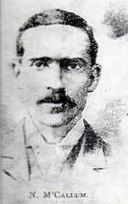

Personal information
- Full name: Cornelius McCallum
- Date of birth: 3 July 1868
- Place of birth: Bonhill, Scotland
- Date of death: 5 November 1920 (aged 52)
- Place of death: Springburn, Glasgow
- Position: Outside right

Senior career*
Years	Team	Apps	(Gls)
1885–1888	Renton (Note: No league stats apply – the Scottish Football League began in the 1890–91 season.)		
1888–1890	Celtic	189	(178)
1890	Blackburn Rovers	2	(0)
1890–1891	Nottingham Forest (Note: Includes stats for the Football Alliance for 1890–91.)	19	(8)
1891–1892	Celtic	20	(12)
1892–1895	Nottingham Forest	36	(13)
1894	→ Loughborough (loan)		
1895	→ Newark Town (loan)		
1895–1896	Notts County	13	(3)
1896–1897	Heanor Town		
- Gravesend

International career
1888	Scotland	1	(1)
1892	Scottish League XI	1	(0)
- * Club domestic league appearances and goals

Cornelius "Neil" McCallum (3 July 1868 – 5 November 1920) was a Scottish footballer who played as an outside right for Renton, Celtic, Blackburn Rovers, Nottingham Forest, Notts County, Heanor Town and Scotland.

McCallum had the distinction of being part of the Renton team that defeated West Bromwich Albion in a challenge match in May 1888, billed as the "World Championship". By now also an international but still a teenager, later in the same month he joined the newly formed Celtic and scored the club's first ever goal in their inaugural match, a 5–2 win over Rangers. When he won the Scottish Cup during his second spell at Celtic in 1892 alongside former Renton teammate James Kelly, they became the first players to win the competition with two different clubs, having also been victorious with their old club in 1888.

His nephew Charles and great-nephew Denis McCallum were also footballers, the latter playing for Celtic in the 1920s.
