= Charles McCallum =

Scottish footballer

Personal information
- Full name: Charles McCallum
- Place of birth: Scotland
- Date of death: August 1930
- Place of death: Glasgow, Scotland
- Position: Winger

Senior career*
Years	Team	Apps	(Gls)
1910–1911	Burnley	4	(0)
- * Club domestic league appearances and goals

Charles McCallum (died 10 August 1930) was a Scottish professional footballer who played as a winger. His uncle Neil and his son Denis both played for Celtic.
