= Frank Kelly (footballer, born 1892) =

Scottish footballer

Personal information
- Full name: Francis David Kelly
- Date of birth: 8 December 1892
- Place of birth: Glasgow, Scotland
- Date of death: 5 May 1919 (aged 26)
- Place of death: Montargis, France
- Position: Outside right

Senior career*
Years	Team	Apps	(Gls)
1912–1915	Blantyre Victoria		
1915–1919	Motherwell	82	(17)
1918	→ Celtic (guest)	1	(0)
1918	→ Celtic (guest)	1	(0)
- * Club domestic league appearances and goals

Francis David Kelly (8 December 1892 – 5 May 1919) was a Scottish professional footballer who played as an outside right in the Scottish League for Motherwell and Celtic.

== Personal life ==
Kelly was the son of former Celtic player and chairman James Kelly, while his younger brother Robert also served the club as chairman. He served as a private in the Cameronians (Scottish Rifles) during the First World War. Kelly survived the war, but was killed trying to jump onto a train in Montargis, France on 5 May 1919. He was buried in Montargis Communal Cemetery.

== Career statistics ==
Appearances and goals by club, season and competition
Club	Season	League			Scottish Cup		Total	
Club	Season	Division	Apps	Goals	Apps	Goals	Apps	Goals
Motherwell	1915–16	Scottish Division One	35	9	—		35	9
Motherwell	1916–17	Scottish Division One	35	7	—		35	7
Motherwell	1917–18	Scottish Division One	12	1	—		12	1
Motherwell	Total		82	17	—		82	17
Celtic (guest)	1917–18	Scottish Division One	1	0	—		1	0
Celtic (guest)	1918–19	Scottish Division One	1	0	—		1	0
Celtic (guest)	Total		2	0	—		2	0
Career total			84	17	0	0	84	17
