= Skeets Gallacher =

Scottish boxer (1925–2013)

Richard "Skeets" Gallacher (24 August 1925 in Renton, Scotland – 10 December 2013) was a Scottish boxer. As a boy he was trained as a boxer by his father, who identified him as a natural southpaw. Richard was nicknamed "Skeets" after Skeets Gallagher and had his first fight in 1942 weighing only 7 stones (44 kg). Skeets went on to win 34 consecutive amateur contests and in doing so became Scottish and British Champion. Defeats of French and American rivals later saw him crowned unofficial amateur flyweight champion of the world. His professional career was cut short by injury, but he remained a well-respected figure still involved in later years in keep fit classes and local boxing clubs. Gallacher Way in Renton was named after him in 1995.
