= James Gourlay (footballer, born 1862) =

Scottish footballer

Personal information
- Date of birth: 30 October 1862
- Place of birth: Cambuslang, Scotland
- Date of death: 8 June 1926 (aged 63)
- Place of death: Cambuslang, Scotland
- Position: Outside left

Senior career*
Years	Team	Apps	(Gls)
1884–1890	Cambuslang		

International career
1886	Scotland	1	(1)
- * Club domestic league appearances and goals

James Gourlay (30 October 1862 – 8 June 1926) was a Scottish footballer who played as an outside left.

== Career ==
Born in Cambuslang, Gourlay played club football for Cambuslang (appearing in the 1888 Scottish Cup Final) and made one appearance for Scotland against Ireland in 1886 (a 7–2 victory in which he scored the last goal). He is often confused with another James Gourlay, also a Cambuslang player, who was capped for Scotland in 1888.
