= Robert Kelly (football chairman) =

Scottish football chairman

Sir Robert Kelly
- Born: Robert McErlean Kelly; 17 October 1902; Blantyre, Scotland
- Died: 21 September 1971 (aged 68); Burnside, Glasgow, Scotland
- Known for: Celtic Football Club Chairman; SFA President
- Board member of: Celtic F.C., Scottish Football Association
- Spouse: Marie Josephine Reilly (m. 1933)
- Parent(s): James Kelly; Margaret (née McErlean)

Sir Robert McErlean Kelly (17 October 1902 – 21 September 1971) was appointed a member of the board of Scottish football club Celtic after the death of his father James Kelly in 1931. He later became chairman in 1947, a position he held until 1971.

== Early life ==
Robert Kelly was born on 17 October 1902 in Blantyre, Lanarkshire, the fourth son in a family of six sons and four daughters. His father James Kelly played for Celtic, and was the club's first ever captain. James Kelly subsequently became a director at the club and had a brief spell as chairman. Robert Kelly's mother, Margaret, was also herself the daughter of a Celtic founder.

Kelly and his brothers were educated at St Joseph's College, Dumfries, a fee-paying school opened to develop a professional Catholic middle class in Scotland. His eldest brother, Frank, went on to play a handful of games for Celtic in 1918, but was killed trying to jump onto a train in France in 1919. Three other brothers played for Queen's Park. Kelly himself played football for a spell at junior level for Blantyre Victoria, but was limited due to an injury sustained to his arm in a childhood traffic accident, and he soon gave up playing at his father's behest. Despite his arm injury, Kelly was also an excellent tennis player. Kelly went on to become a stockbroker by profession.

== Celtic director and football legislator ==
Following the death of his father, Kelly joined the Celtic board of directors in 1932. Taking an interest in the administrative side of the game, he joined the Scottish League Management Committee in 1939. When chairman Tom White died in 1947, Kelly was appointed as his successor. Although Celtic's performances were generally poor at this time, Kelly's value as a legislator was quickly realised, and he was elected as president of the Scottish Football League in 1950.

Kelly was a prime advocate in Scotland for use of the new all-weather white ball, in preference to the then standard brown leather ball which generally got heavier as the match progressed and was difficult for spectators to see on dark afternoons.

He also resolutely defended Celtic's right to fly the Eire flag at Celtic Park when the SFA made efforts in 1952 to have it removed. He had a close working relationship at Celtic with manager Jimmy McGrory, and indeed had the final say on team selection in most instances. This resulted in decisions on line-ups that on occasion appeared somewhat eccentric.

Despite this, Celtic's performances improved in the early 1950s, and a Scottish Cup Final win in 1951 was followed three years later by a league and cup double. In the late 1950s, he introduced a youth system, nicknamed 'Kelly's Babes', signing up a large group of talented local teenagers in an effort to emulate the Busby Babes of the era.

In 1960, Kelly was elected as president of the SFA, and his tenure in that role coincided with an upturn in Scotland's football success. He expressed strong views on a variety of footballing matters, opposing the live television coverage of matches, due to concern that the fees obtained would not compensate for loss of atmosphere within the ground. He was, however, dismissive of the World Cup, stating regarding the 1962 tournament in Chile – "I can see no sense in playing... [in]... a remote country in which I understand it takes one year to become acclimatised." He also initially lacked enthusiasm for European club competitions, instead advocating the setting up of a British Cup tournament.

Celtic, however, were once again struggling in the early 1960s. By early 1965 they had gone over seven years without a major trophy. At this time, Kelly approached Jock Stein to become manager of Celtic. Stein agreed, taking control of all team matters from Kelly. Within weeks, Celtic won the Scottish Cup, and the following season won the first of nine successive league championships. In season 1966–1967 Celtic won all four domestic competitions, and also became the first non-Latin club to win the European Cup, defeating Inter Milan 2–1 in Lisbon. Many of the Lisbon Lions players were 'Kelly Babes' who had been with the club for several years, though it took the appointment of Stein for their potential to be effectively honed.

In the 1969 New Year Honours, Kelly became the first club chairman in Scotland to be knighted, for services to Scottish football. He regarded the honour as belonging to Celtic and Scotland as much as to himself.

Kelly stood down as chairman in April 1971, where he was then given the honorary title at Celtic of Club President. Desmond White succeeded him as Celtic chairman. After several months of illness, Kelly died at his home on 21 September 1971.

Jock Stein stated that "No man has done more for the club [Celtic] in every way than Sir Robert Kelly." Scottish League president, James Aitken, described Kelly as one of the "giants" of Scottish football, and that he was "a most outstanding legislator."
