= Clydebank F.C. (Rutherglen) =

Scottish football club

Clydebank
- Full name: Clydebank Football Club
- Nickname: the Clyde
- Founded: 1874
- Dissolved: 1886
- Ground: Phoenix Park
- Chairman: Colin Gardner
- Secretary: Thomas Millar
Home colours

Clydebank Football Club was a 19th-century football club based in Rutherglen, Scotland.

== History ==
The club was formed in 1874, as a winter activity for the Clydebank Cricket Club. It was the first football club to use the Clydebank name and the only one not to come from the town of Clydebank located to the north-west of Glasgow; instead their home was south-east of the city centre, on the left bank of the River Clyde.

The earliest matches recorded for the club are from the 1875–76 season. Although the club was active in its early years, including fixtures against well-regarded clubs such as Cambuslang and Caledonian, it did not join the Scottish Football Association until the 1879–80 season. This enabled it to enter the Scottish Cup for the first time, although the club lost 2–1 at Airdrie Excelsior in the first round.

In the same season, it was one of the founder members of the Lanarkshire Football Association. It played in the first Lanarkshire Cup, losing 4–2 to Shotts F.C. in the second round.

Despite this increased activity and membership, the club never entered either competition again, instead playing junior football until 1886.

== Colours ==
The club originally played in blue shirts and white shorts. By 1879 it had changed to red and blue two-inch "stripes" (in the context of the time referring to hoops).

== Ground ==
The club's earliest recorded matches were played on Glasgow Green before the first home matches recorded at Phoenix Park in Rutherglen in 1876. The ground was by the Dalmarnock Bridge.
