= James Kelly (footballer, born 1865) =

Scottish footballer

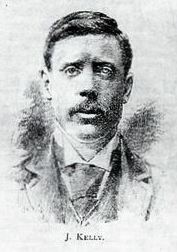

Personal information
- Full name: James Kelly
- Date of birth: 25 January 1865
- Place of birth: Renton, Scotland
- Date of death: 20 February 1932 (aged 67)
- Place of death: Blantyre, Scotland
- Position: Centre-half

Youth career
- Renton Wanderers

Senior career*
Years	Team	Apps	(Gls)
1883–1888	Renton		
1888–1897	Celtic	103	(3)

International career
1886–1893	Scotland	9	(2)
1893–1897	Scottish League XI	7	(0)
- * Club domestic league appearances and goals

James Kelly (25 January 1865 – 20 February 1932) was a Scottish footballer who played for Renton, Celtic and Scotland.

At Renton, his hometown club, Kelly had won the Scottish Cup twice (1885 and 1888), as well as a beaten finalist in 1886 and a 'World Champion' after they defeated West Bromwich Albion in an 1888 challenge match.

Converted from an inside forward to a centre-half of attacking bent in what was an important evolution in tactics developed at Renton, he was the first Celtic captain, playing in their first-ever match, a 5–2 win against Rangers in May 1888 (less than two weeks after playing in Renton's World Championship game). He added to his medal collection with another Scottish Cup in 1892 alongside former Renton teammate Neil McCallum, becoming the first players to win the competition with two different clubs. Kelly also won the Scottish Football League title in 1892–93, 1893–94 and 1895–96 (and reached three other cup finals, albeit losing them all), playing a major role in the establishment of Celtic as one of the leading clubs in the country.

He was capped nine times by Scotland and scored twice. He also appeared seven times for the Scottish League XI. After retiring as a player, Kelly became a director of Celtic, serving as chairman between 1909 and 1914.

His descendants Bob Kelly, Michael Kelly and Kevin Kelly also became Celtic directors; a son, Frank also briefly played for the club prior to his death in World War I, and in 1934 another Celtic player Willie Hughes married James Kelly's daughter Bridie, two years after he died.

== See also ==
- List of Scotland national football team captains
- List of Scottish football families
