= Renton, West Dunbartonshire =

Coordinates: 55.971°N 04.584°W

Renton
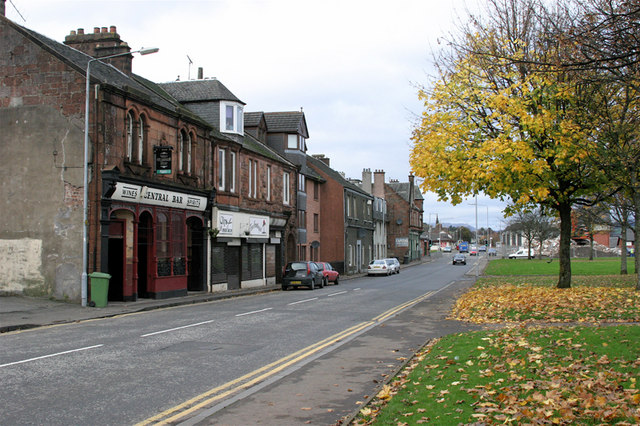
- Main Street in Renton

- Location within West Dunbartonshire
- Population: 2,350 (2020)
- OS grid reference: NS3878
- Civil parish: Cardross
- Council area: West Dunbartonshire
- Lieutenancy area: Dunbartonshire
- Country: Scotland
- Sovereign state: United Kingdom
- Post town: DUMBARTON
- Postcode district: G82
- Dialling code: 01389
- Police: Scotland
- Fire: Scottish
- Ambulance: Scottish
- UK Parliament: West Dunbartonshire
- Scottish Parliament: Dumbarton

Renton is a village in the Vale of Leven in West Dunbartonshire, Scotland. In the 2001 National Census it had a population of 2,138.

Renton is particularly famous for its association football side. Renton F.C. was one of the 11 founding members of the Scottish Football League and was the winner of the 1885 and 1888 Scottish Cups, producing many famous players.

== History ==
Renton was built as a model village in 1762, taking its name from Cecilia Renton, the wife of the local landlord. Dalquhurn Bleachworks in 1715 and Cordale Printworks in 1770 were responsible for attracting new industrial workers. At the north of the village stood the Place of Bonhill, a residence from 1642; to the South was Dalquhurn House. Two parallel north–south streets, Main Street and Back Street, were first joined by Station Street, Stirling Street, Burns Street, Thimble Street, Market Street and Red Row. In late Victorian times, the village extended southwards to Leven Street, Alexander Street and John Street. Further expansion occurred in the 1930s as housing was built in the grounds of Cordale House. In the early 1960s the majority of the sandstone properties in the village were compulsorily purchased by Dumbarton County Council, demolished and replaced by the council with 1960s Brutalist-style concrete houses and flats, the majority of which have been replaced by proper houses, own front and back door, by the Cordale Housing Association.

Renton has traditionally been a stronghold of radical left-wing politics. During the 1930s it had Communist councillors, Bunger Lamont, never toed the Labour Party line and independent councillors such as Jimmy McKenzie (1960/70s). Since 1999 it has been represented on West Dunbartonshire council by Jim Bollan, at present the Scottish Socialist Party's only councillor.

It lies on the main road, A82 as was, between Alexandria and Dumbarton. Renton railway station is on the line from Glasgow to Balloch. It has a footbridge across the River Leven to the Strathleven Industrial Estate (once a major source of employment), and a minor road, with a steep 33% hill, across Carman Hill to Cardross.

=== Robert the Bruce's manor house ===
Despite a report that appeared in The Observer on Sunday 22 February 2009 stating that the buried ruins of the manor house of Robert the Bruce had been found in the Pillanflatt area of Renton, this interpretation has yet to be confirmed. While there is strong charter evidence to indicate the presence of a manor or hunting lodge belonging to Bruce in the area, this is more likely to have been located in the vicinity of Mains of Cardross, to the south of the Pillanflat, rather than in the area to the north of it. Stone, plaster and mortar are not generally susceptible to scientific dating techniques, and lime mortar was used from the Roman period up to the late 19th or early 20th centuries.

According to Bruce Historian Stuart Smith, a charter dating from 1362 charter states that Robert the Bruce resided between Kings Park of Cardross and the lands of Pillanflatt, bounding the lands of Dalquhurn. This would suggest a site to the south of the Pillanflat, but to the north of Castle Park, in the vicinity of what is now Mains of Cardross.

=== Modern times ===
In recent times, Renton has seen some major social regeneration most notably, although not restricted to, housing.

== Notable residents ==
- Jack Ashurst, footballer
- Robert the Bruce, King Of Scotland
- Jane Duncan, author
- Andy Duncan, footballer
- Sir Alex Ferguson: Both his grandfather & father were born in Renton & worked in the shipyard in Dumbarton. The family moved to Linthouse near Govan to gain employment in the Govan shipyard.
- Skeets Gallacher, boxer
- James Allison Glen, Canadian politician
- Andrew Hannah, footballer
- Alex Jackson, footballer
- James Kelly, footballer
- Duncan McLaren, Scottish politician
- John O'Hare, footballer
- Tobias Smollett, writer and surgeon
- William Wilson, Australian politician

== Sport ==
When Renton F.C. won the World Cup, the footballing world was in its infancy in 1888, almost exclusively played by Scottish and English clubs. It was a World Cup Championship by default – nevertheless Renton's claim is undisputed. They won the Scottish Cup with a 6-1 thrashing of Cambuslang F.C. Then they humbled English Cup holders West Bromwich Albion, who had prepared in Scotland for two weeks. The score was 4–1 in front of a record 10,000 fans at Hampden Park. Renton endorsed their title with an away win against "The Invincibles" of Preston North End. A "Champion of the World" sign was proudly displayed on the pavilion at Tontine Park. They are one of the few teams to have their name engraved on the Scottish Cup multiple times (2 wins), They were ahead of their time in training for stamina and strength. Their weapon was Renton's own famous "chicken bree", the ingredients never disclosed but it was probably port wine switched with a couple of eggs administered daily.

Quoiting (pronounced kiteing) was a popular sport amongst the male villagers. Quoiting greens were found in Renton, Alexandria, Hardgate and many Ayrshire villages. Quoits were heavy iron rings, rounded on one side, flat on the other and weighed 8–12 pounds (3.5–5.5 kilograms) but could be up to 23 pounds (10 kilograms). They were hurled at a steel pin driven into a 3-foot (90-centimetre) square clay bed, with the common length of the green being 18 yards (16 metres). Renton were Scottish Champions in 1949 and 1986. There is a photograph of the victorious 1949 team in Renton Railway Station.

== Facilities ==
There are several recreational and consumer-related facilities in Renton, including a new mini supermarket and healthy living centre. There is a bowling green and a Freemasons lodge.

Wylie Park (known locally as Tontine Park ) is also used most Saturdays and Sundays for football games. It is home to local youth football team Renton Craigandro.

There is a youth club at the Autism and Aspergers Centre (old nursery) every Wednesday, 6pm-7:30pm for Primary 1 to 6 and 7:30pm-9pm for 1st, 2nd and 3rd Years at high school.
