= Alexander Barbour =

Scottish footballer (1862–1930)

Personal information
- Date of birth: 7 June 1862
- Place of birth: Dumbarton, Scotland
- Date of death: 29 December 1930 (aged 68)
- Place of death: Bonhill, Scotland
- Position: Forward

Youth career
- 1880-1881: Dalry Primrose F.C.
- 1881-1882: Dalry Albert F.C.
- 1882-1883: Dundee

Senior career*
Years	Team	Apps	(Gls)
1883–1888	Renton		
1888–1891	Bolton Wanderers	34	(17)
1891–1892	Glossop North End		
1892–18??	Nottingham Forest	1	(0)

International career
1885	Scotland	1	(1)
- * Club domestic league appearances and goals

Alexander Barbour (7 June 1862 – 29 December 1930) was a Scottish footballer, who played for Renton, Bolton Wanderers, Glossop North End, Nottingham Forest and the Scotland national team.

Barbour, who was born in Dumbarton and played as a striker, won the Scottish Cup with Renton in 1885. He won his first, and only, Scotland cap the same year, scoring in an 8–2 win over Ireland. He also played in the unsuccessful Scottish Cup final the previous year as Renton lost 3–1 to Queen's Park. He was transferred from British Guiana to the Gold Coast in 1902. At the time of his civil service transfer, he tried to relocate his family to be with him but this was not sanctioned by his employers.

He was signed by Bolton Wanderers in May 1888 and scored 17 goals in 34 matches in three years for the club. He had a season with Glossop North End in season 1891-92 and was then signed by Nottingham Forest as a coach, although he made one final league appearance for them in 1893.
