= Andrew Hannah =

Scottish footballer (1864–1940)

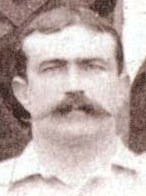
- Hannah on a 1892 Liverpool team photo

Personal information
- Full name: Andrew Boyd Hannah
- Date of birth: 17 September 1864
- Place of birth: Renton, Dunbartonshire, Scotland
- Date of death: 29 May 1940 (aged 75)
- Place of death: Glasgow, Scotland
- Height: 5 ft 7 1/2 in (1.71 m)
- Position: Right-back

Youth career
- Renton Wanderers

Senior career*
| Years | Team | Apps | (Gls) |
| 1882–1888 | Renton | | |
| 1888 | West Bromwich Albion | | |
| 1888–1889 | Renton | | |
| 1889–1891 | Everton | 42 | (0) |
| 1891–1892 | Renton | 18 | (0) |
| 1892–1895 | Liverpool | 40 | (1) |
| 1895–1896 | Rob Roy | | |
| 1896–1897 | Clyde | 9 | (0) |

International career
| 1888 | Scotland | 1 | (0) |
| 1892 | Scottish League XI | 1 | (0) |
- * Club domestic league appearances and goals

Andrew Boyd Hannah (17 September 1864 – 29 May 1940) was a Scottish footballer who played as a right-back. He missed just two games in Everton's 1890–91 title-winning season. In 1892 he became the first captain of Liverpool. In 2006 he was listed in 100 players who shook the Kop, a Liverpool fan poll. He made one appearance for the Scotland national team, in 1888.

== Career ==
=== Renton ===
Born in Renton, Dunbartonshire, to Irish parents, Hannah first played for Renton, where he was part of a side that won the Scottish Cup twice and were then crowned unofficial champions of the world after defeating English cup holders, West Bromwich Albion in 1888. Hannah so impressed his opponents that they signed him in time for the first ever Football League season but he was unable to settle at Stoney Lane and returned to his hometown club for a second spell before being enticed south again in time for the second Football League season.

=== Everton ===
Hannah's second spell in England came at Everton and proved to be his most successful as he was ever-present in the side which finished runners-up in the 1889–90 season. The following season was even better for the Scot, as the Everton claimed their first league title. Hannah himself had missed just two games and was a vital part of the club's success. That summer, however, he returned to Scotland for a third spell with his hometown club Renton.

=== Liverpool ===
In 1892, following Everton's departure from Anfield and the formation of a new club, Liverpool, to replace them, Hannah was lured back to Merseyside by the new club's manager, John McKenna and treasurer William Barclay, the latter having been his manager in his Everton days. Hannah was the right back in Liverpool's first ever competitive fixture, an 8–0 victory against Higher Walton on the 3 September 1892 in the Lancashire League, which the Reds went on to win convincingly. Andrew then had the honour of becoming one of the 11 players that played in Liverpool's first Football League fixture the following season a 2–0 win over Middlesbrough Ironopolis at the Paradise Field on 2 September 1893; he went on to play in 24 of the 28 matches which saw Liverpool win the Football League Second Division. He also became the first person to captain both Liverpool and Everton.

Hannah went on to play 73 times for Liverpool before leaving in 1895. He only managed to score the one goal, in a 2–0 victory over Burslem Port Vale on the 14 April 1894. His teammates in his final season included David Hannah, also a former Renton player and possibly a cousin to a degree (like Andrew's parents David was also born in County Down before relocating to Dunbartonshire) but not a direct relative.

Subsequently he moved back to Scotland where he worked in a shipyard and lived in Kirkintilloch and Clydebank.

=== Scotland ===
Hannah made one appearance for Scotland whilst a Renton player, on 10 March 1888. The match ended in a 5–1 victory over Wales at Hibernian Park, Edinburgh. He also represented the Scottish League once, in 1892 during his third Renton spell.

== Honours ==
Renton

- Scottish Cup: 1884–85, 1887–88; runner-up 1885–86

Everton

- Football League: 1890–91

Liverpool

- Football League Second Division: 1893–94
