= John Lindsay (footballer, born 1862) =

Scottish footballer (1862–1932)

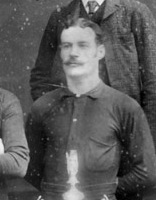

Personal information
- Full name: John Lindsay
- Date of birth: 1862
- Place of birth: Renton, Scotland
- Date of death: 1932 (aged 69–70)
- Place of death: Dumbarton, Scotland
- Position: Goalkeeper

Senior career*
Years	Team	Apps	(Gls)
1885-1889	Renton		
1889–1892	Accrington	21	(0)
1892-1893	Renton		
1893-1894	St. Bernard's		

International career
1888–1893	Scotland	3	(0)
- * Club domestic league appearances and goals

John Lindsay (1862–1932) was a Scottish footballer who played in the Football League for Accrington. He represented Scotland three times between 1888 and 1893.

== Club career ==
Lindsay played in goal in all three Scottish Cup Finals played by Renton, his hometown club. He spent four years on their books between 1885 and 1889.

Lindsay signed for Accrington in 1889 and played in all but one first team match during the 1889–90 season, which was Accrington's best Football League outcome, finishing sixth; however they conceded 56 goals, the fourth worst in the division. Lindsay failed to keep a clean sheet in any league match, only doing so in an FA Cup replay, won 3–0 against West Bromwich Albion.

He remained with Accrington for another two seasons but never played again in major competitions, returning to Renton in 1892.
