= Football World Championship =

- Organiser(s): FA (England); SFA (Scotland)
- Founded: 1876
- Abolished: 1904; 122 years ago
- Teams: 2
- Most championships: Queen's Park (4 titles)

The Football World Championship, also known as the United Kingdom Championship or the International Club Championship, was an exhibition association football match played between the English and Scottish club champions (either national cup or league championship) on a regular, but not annual, basis in the late 19th and early 20th centuries, with varying degrees of press attention and public interest. Perhaps the most widely publicised at the time under the 'World Championship' name was the 1888 event between Renton and West Bromwich Albion, while in the modern age interest from historians has drawn more attention to matches involving Sunderland, particularly the 1895 match.

== History ==
=== 1870s ===
Matches were played between the winners of the English FA Cup and the Scottish Cup from November 1876, when Wanderers lost to Queen's Park at The Oval in London; press reports from the time made little mention of the fact that both were holders of the principal trophy of their country, and the fixture was a repeat of an arrangement from the previous year. It appears that a return match in Glasgow was planned during the 1876–77 season (as had occurred in 1875–76), but there are no records of this taking place due to a dispute over expenses. The next meeting between the cup winners was in April 1878 between Wanderers and Vale of Leven (both of whom had just retained the respective trophies), again taking place in London, won by the Scottish side and with no great fanfare over its significance. Vale of Leven were also involved in the next match in December 1879 when they defeated Old Etonians at the first Hampden Park, the first such match to take place in Scotland and in difficult weather conditions.

=== 1880s ===
In May 1880, Queen's Park beat Clapham Rovers in Glasgow (with proceeds from the match going to a memorial fund for SFA secretary William Dick who had recently died) then repeated this in London the following February. The Spiders then routed Old Carthusians 8–0 in January 1882 at Hampden (again in very bad weather, and something of a freak result as the Charterhouse School alumni restricted Vale of Leven to a 2–1 defeat a day later). with no return match known to have taken place. All of these matches were reported in some detail by newspapers, but no mention was given to a formal championship, either of 'Great Britain' or 'The World'.

That situation changed somewhat in September 1883, when Dumbarton's match against Blackburn Olympic in Scotland was referred to in multiple publications as the "Championship of the United Kingdom". This resulted in a convincing win for Dumbarton; it is unclear whether a return match in February 1884 (won more narrowly by Blackburn Olympic) was considered a second leg of the same tie. The situation at that time was complicated somewhat by the fact that Scottish teams could and did enter the FA Cup, somewhat negating the idea of there being two separate paths to the trophies: a prime example of this came only a week afterwards, when Blackburn Olympic played Queen's Park in the semi-final of the 1883–84 FA Cup in Nottingham. The Scots (who had by then been awarded the Scottish Cup when Vale of Leven refused to play on the scheduled date) progressed to the 1884 FA Cup Final where they lost 2–1 to Blackburn Rovers, another side from the same Lancashire town as the previous winners. Although both clubs played several other cross-border friendlies over the next year, they did not meet each other again until the 1885 FA Cup Final, by which time Queen's Park's status as Scottish Cup holders had been ended (they were eliminated as early as October in a shock defeat to Battlefield, while Renton won the title in February). Thus the second Anglo-Scottish FA Cup final on 4 April 1885 – again won by Blackburn Rovers – could also not be considered a true meeting of the English and Scottish reigning champions. Over the next season Rovers never met Renton, but did challenge Queen's Park twice in that period (the matches noteworthy for the rule laid down by staunchly amateur Scottish Football Association that any professionals employed by Blackburn could not take part, with the makeshift teams well beaten home and away as a consequence). The 1886 FA Cup winners were Blackburn Rovers for a third successive time while Queen's Park reclaimed the Scottish version, but once again these familiar opponents did not arrange to face each other over the next season; Rovers this time did play Renton.

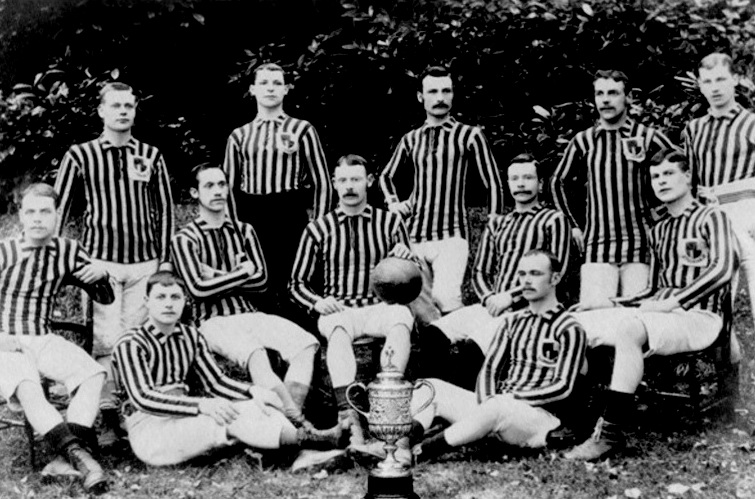
The Aston Villa team of 1887, champion

A match was played in April 1887 at Perry Barr, Birmingham between the teams who had just won the respective cups, Hibernian and Aston Villa, with the home side winning 3–0. Local newspapers are said to have reported this as a de facto world championship game, however, the Scottish publications The Glasgow Herald and The Scotsman reported on it in no grander terms or greater detail than several other cross-border challenge matches of that weekend and the similar meetings of previous years, acknowledging the participants' status only in passing. Having lost this match, Hibernian are said to have advertised their August 1887 friendly against Preston North End (which they won 2–1) as 'The Association Football Championship of the World' and thus claimed the honour; however, while Preston were emerging as one of the leading sides of the period and had beaten strong Scottish opposition in the form of Queen's Park and Renton in the 1886–87 FA Cup, the Lilywhites had lost in the semi-finals to West Bromwich Albion, who had lost to Aston Villa, who had beaten Hibs.

The 1886–87 FA Cup was also the last edition in which Scottish clubs would take part, with Rangers reaching the semi-finals. With the cross-border matches at official level having ended, much attention was given in the press to the meeting of 1887–88 Scottish Cup winners Renton and 1887–88 FA Cup winners West Bromwich Albion in May 1888, with it being noted that unlike many English clubs, West Brom had only English players in their team, and therefore the fixture had a genuinely international aspect. Renton, whose players all originated from their small community in Dunbartonshire, won 4–1 in the midst of a thunderstorm at the second Hampden Park in Glasgow; a re-match in the Black Country under more clement conditions never materialised, although Renton demonstrated their credentials further with a victory over Preston a month later, followed by wins against Sunderland (twice) and Aston Villa during their year as 'holders'. a small pewter trophy – the only known physical prize from any of these matches – was commissioned (today displayed at the Scottish Football Museum) and a "Champions of the World" sign was erected at their Tontine Park ground (which did not survive its demolition in the 1920s). Renton's reign was ended at the semi-final stage of the 1888–89 Scottish Cup by 3rd Lanark R.V., who went on to lift the trophy and faced off against 'The Invincibles' of Preston North End, who had won both the FA Cup and the inaugural 1888–89 title of the Football League without losing a match; a 3–3 draw was the outcome, although local press reports made little of the status of the fixture despite the grandiose label attached to the previous year's match and the fame of Preston's (mostly Scottish) side and their achievement of that season.

With no formal name, date or other consistent factor to denote the 'British/World Championship' matches, discerning what may be considered the latest instalment of such an event was made more complicated by the introduction of the English national league competition, although Preston's 1888–89 double triumph meant there would be one more year where it was not a consideration. As the 1889–90 season concluded, the potential English participants were Preston again (Football League) and Blackburn Rovers (FA Cup); however, neither played against Scottish Cup holders Queen's Park at the end of that season (Queen's Park played an under-strength Blackburn in the weeks between the Scottish final and the English final) or during the next.

=== 1890s ===
The Scottish Football League began in the 1890–91 season, which introduced a fourth possible participant into the mix – and uniquely a fifth after its first edition, when Rangers and Dumbarton shared the title after a play-off. Everton were the English league champions, while Heart of Midlothian won the Scottish Cup and Blackburn retained the English equivalent. Blackburn and Hearts had played each other in Edinburgh a few months before their cup wins and also in 1890, but did not do so again while holders. The only relevant meeting was between Rangers and Everton, who initially played at the first Ibrox Park in October 1891, the Toffees winning 4–1. A return match scheduled for Boxing Day did not take place, and it was not until April 1892 that Rangers gained some revenge with a 2–0 win at Goodison Park; press reports clearly regarded the matches as a pair, but again there was little mention of any additional honour being at stake. By the time of the delayed second match, both clubs had lost their champion status, Dumbarton claiming the Scottish title outright and Sunderland displacing Everton; West Bromwich Albion and Celtic were the cup winners. Again there was only one fixture which could make any claim to be a cross-border championship, this being Sunderland v Celtic which took place in September 1892 (1–0 to Sunderland) followed quickly by a reverse fixture a month later (3–0 to Sunderland). The Wearsiders kept their league title and Celtic won the Scottish league, but there was no re-match between them the following season. Instead it was 1893 Scottish Cup winners Queen's Park who took on Sunderland, with the April 1893 match described somewhat imprecisely in the Glasgow Herald as a "holiday match between the English and Scottish champions". Sunderland again prevailed 4–2, two days after their second championship was sealed mathematically. Queen's Park then took on the new FA Cup winners Wolverhampton Wanderers in Glasgow a fortnight later and won comprehensively 5–0,

As soon as new 1893–94 league champions were declared – Aston Villa and Celtic respectively – they met in Birmingham on 9 April 1894, headlined by the Scottish Referee as "The Championship of the World". Once again the English side came out on top, this time by a 3–2 scoreline. A few weeks later the cup winners also faced off, the first time the holders of both trophies had been brought together in the wake of their wins, with Rangers overcoming Notts County 3–1. Those teams met again almost a year later (Notts County won 1–0), at which point they were technically still holders with both 1895 domestic cup finals having been moved to later dates, though it is not clear if the matches were to be seen as home-and-away legs, a rematch or two unconnected encounters. Almost as soon as these rescheduled finals did take place, the respective league champions Hearts and Sunderland met in Edinburgh on 27 April 1895, in a match about which the Sunderland Daily Echo commented In Edinburgh the match was billed as for "The championship of the world"! However that may be there can be no doubt that it was an important event, because Sunderland and the Hearts are respectively champions of the English and Scottish Leagues, so that their encounter was of an international character. Sunderland, at that time known as the 'Team of all Talents', formed almost entirely of Scottish players, won 5–3. They also played twice more during the following six months, but newspaper reports made no mention of the previous 'world championship' match and did not appear to regard the follow-ups as any kind of continuing series. The demonstrable ability and coaching of the Scottish professionals in Sunderland's team and others, combined with a series of poor results in the annual fixture against England, prompted the Scottish Association to finally change their selection policy and invite English-based players to play for the national side the following year.

By April 1896, Sunderland had lost their title to Aston Villa, the FA Cup winners being The [Sheffield] Wednesday, while Hearts had been replaced as league winners by Celtic but had claimed the Scottish Cup. both combinations met in the closing weeks of that 1895–96 season, with Celtic hosting Villa and running out winners by 3–2, and Hearts defeating Wednesday 3–0 at Tynecastle Park. On the Celtic v Villa match, the 'Scottish Referee' reported its view that "We think that more importance should be attached to the honour of the international League championship. It means a big effort on the part of the clubs engage, and given such brilliant football as that seen on Monday evening at Celtic Park, is worthy of three times the attendance that graced the meeting that evening."

Despite this apparent enthusiasm for the fixture in some quarters, there was no match known to have taken place between double winners Aston Villa opposing either Rangers (Scottish Cup) or Hearts (SFL) in the 1896–97 period, but conversely in March 1898 Sheffield United and Celtic met at Bramall Lane, before the Yorkshire men (who won 1–0 on the day) were even confirmed as champions of England. The Blades did go on to take the title, and the outcome of the rematch a month later was a 1–1 draw. The four trophy winners in 1898–99 were familiar names: Aston Villa, Sheffield United, Celtic and Rangers, but it appears no match was arranged between them. As in previous years, when the next league season concluded, its champions – Aston Villa and Rangers – played in Glasgow at the earliest opportunity, resulting in a goalless draw; the Scottish Referee reported "neither club can claim the championship", suggesting that an honour of some kind was being contested, but The Scotsman made no mention of any prize as such, although stating that the teams were strong and the match keenly contested.

=== 1900s ===
At the end of the 1900–01 season there was no sign of league champions Rangers and Liverpool meeting, but the cup winners Hearts and Tottenham Hotspur (members of the Southern Football League) faced off in September 1901 (0–0 in London) and January 1902 (3–1 to Hearts in Edinburgh). City rivals Hibernian took the Scottish Cup but there is no record of them meeting 1902 FA Cup Final victors Sheffield United, nor any fixture between league winners Sunderland and Rangers. At the end of that season, the four-team British League Cup – a fundraising tournament following the 1902 Ibrox disaster – was held, with the league winners and runners-up of both countries involved; however, the champions never played each other. In 1903 Hibs took the SFL title and Sheffield Wednesday won the Football League, while Rangers the Scottish Cup and Bury the FA Cup. Rangers and Bury met over two matches, with both the first fixture on Christmas Day 1903 and the return on 4 January 1904 won 2–1 by the Shakers.

From the reports available, it appears Bury v Rangers was the final match between Scottish and English trophy holders in the early 20th century; by that point leagues had already expanded to fill more dates in the regular season calendar along with other commitments, while foreign travel was becoming more accessible in the close season for the leading clubs. With interest in the sport and skill levels rising across Europe and the Americas, it was no longer convincing to describe an exclusively British event as a 'World Championship'. The changing football landscape leading up to the outbreak of World War I was shown in the summer of 1914, when the English and Scottish cup holders – Burnley and Celtic respectively – were both on tour in central Europe, and a match between them was arranged in Hungary, with the 'Budapest Cup' trophy on offer. A fiercely-contested match ended in a draw; Celtic later won a replay at Turf Moor three months later, with the war by now underway (the trophy was never presented, with a replacement gifted in 1988). Both clubs had lost matches on their tours, and any claim by Celtic to some kind of wider honour could have been challenged by Irish Cup holders Glentoran of Belfast who had won the Vienna Cup, a similar contemporaneous event in Austria.

== Summary ==
According to all known fixtures between eligible clubs. Winners marked in bold. (C) denotes a match between cup winners, (L) a match between league champions.

Ed.	Year	Final			Venue	City	Ref.
Ed.	Year	Winner	Score	Runner-up	Venue	City	Ref.
1	1876 (C)	(Scotland) **Queen's Park**	6–0	(England) Wanderers	The Oval	Lambeth	
2	1878 (C)	(Scotland) **Vale of Leven**	3–1	(England) Wanderers	The Oval	Lambeth	
3	1879 (C)	(Scotland) **Vale of Leven**	5–2	(England) Old Etonians	Hampden Park (I)	Crosshill	
3	1880–81 (C)	(Scotland) **Queen's Park**	3–2	(England) Clapham Rovers	Hampden Park (I)	Crosshill	
3	1880–81 (C)	(Scotland) **Queen's Park**	1–0	(England) Clapham Rovers	The Oval	Lambeth	
4	1882 (C)	(Scotland) **Queen's Park**	8–0	(England) Old Carthusians	Hampden Park (I)	Crosshill	
5	1883–84 (C)	(Scotland) **Dumbarton**	6–1	(England) Blackburn Olympic	Boghead Park	Dumbarton	
5	1883–84 (C)	(Scotland) **Dumbarton**	3–4	(England) Blackburn Olympic	Hole-i'-th'-Wall	Blackburn	
6	1887 (C)	(England) **Aston Villa**	3–0	(Scotland) Hibernian	Perry Barr	Birmingham	
7	1888 (C)	(Scotland) **Renton**	4–1	(England) West Bromwich Albion	Hampden Park (II)	Crosshill	
8	1889 (C)	(Scotland) **Third Lanark** (Note: Both teams were crowned champions as no playoff match was held.)	3–3	(no runner-up)	Cathkin Park (I)	Crosshill	
8	1889 (C)	(England) **Preston North End**	3–3	(no runner-up)	Cathkin Park (I)	Crosshill	
9	1891–92 (L)	(England) **Everton**	4–1	(Scotland) Rangers	Ibrox Park (I)	Govan	
9	1891–92 (L)	(England) **Everton**	0–2	(Scotland) Rangers	Goodison Park	Liverpool	
10	1892 (LvC)	(England) **Sunderland**	1–0	(Scotland) Celtic	Newcastle Road	Sunderland	
10	1892 (LvC)	(England) **Sunderland**	3–0	(Scotland) Celtic	Celtic Park	Glasgow	
11	1893 (LvC)	(England) **Sunderland**	4–2	(Scotland) Queen's Park	Newcastle Road	Sunderland	
11	1893 (C)	(Scotland) **Queen's Park**	5–0	(England) Wolverhampton Wanderers	Hampden Park (II)	Glasgow	
12	1894 (L)	(England) **Aston Villa**	3–2	(Scotland) Celtic	Perry Barr	Birmingham	
12	1894 (C)	(Scotland) **Rangers**	3–1	(England) Notts County	Ibrox Park (I)	Govan	
13	1895 (L)	(England) **Sunderland**	5–3	(Scotland) Heart of Midlothian	Tynecastle	Edinburgh	
14	1896 (L)	(Scotland) **Celtic**	3–2	(England) Aston Villa	Celtic Park	Glasgow	
14	1896 (C)	(Scotland) **Heart of Midlothian**	3–0	(England) Sheffield Wednesday	Tynecastle	Edinburgh	
15	1898 (L)	(England) **Sheffield United**	1–0	(Scotland) Celtic	Bramall Lane	Sheffield	
15	1898 (L)	(England) **Sheffield United**	1–1	(Scotland) Celtic	Celtic Park	Glasgow	
16	1900 (L)	(Scotland) **Rangers**	0–0	(no runner-up)	Ibrox Park	Govan	
16	1900 (L)	(England) **Aston Villa**	0–0	(no runner-up)	Ibrox Park	Govan	
17	1901–02 (C)	(Scotland) **Heart of Midlothian**	0–0	(England) Tottenham Hotspur	White Hart Lane	London	
17	1901–02 (C)	(Scotland) **Heart of Midlothian**	3–1	(England) Tottenham Hotspur	Tynecastle	Edinburgh	
18	1903–04 (C)	(England) **Bury**	2–1	(Scotland) Rangers	Gigg Lane	Bury	
18	1903–04 (C)	(England) **Bury**	2–1	(Scotland) Rangers	Ibrox Park	Govan	

== Titles by club ==
Club	Titles	Winning years
(Scotland) Queen's Park	4	1876, 1880–81, 1882, 1893
(England) Aston Villa	3	1887, 1894, 1900
(England) Sunderland	3	1892, 1893, 1895
(Scotland) Vale of Leven	2	1878, 1879
(Scotland) Rangers	2	1894, 1900
(Scotland) Heart of Midlothian	2	1896, 1901–02
(Scotland) Dumbarton	1	1884
(Scotland) Renton	1	1888
(Scotland) Third Lanark	1	1889
(England) Preston North End	1	1889
(England) Everton	1	1891–92
(Scotland) Celtic	1	1896
(England) Sheffield United	1	1898
(England) Bury	1	1903–04

== Successors ==
=== England vs. Scotland club tournaments ===
- British League Cup (1902)
- Budapest Cup (1914)
- Empire Exhibition Trophy (1938)
- Coronation Cup (1953)
- Texaco Cup (1970–1975)
- Anglo-Scottish Cup (1975–1981)
- Dubai Champions Cup (1986–1989)

=== International club tournaments ===
- Challenge Cup (Austria-Hungary) (1897–1911)
- Challenge International du Nord (1898–1914)
- Coupe Van der Straeten Ponthoz (1900–1907)
- Coupe Jean Dupuich (1908–1925)
- Torneo Internazionale Stampa Sportiva (1908)
- Sir Thomas Lipton Trophy (1909–1911)
- Copa Rio (1951–1952)
- Small Club World Cup (1952–1970)
- Intercontinental Cup (1960–2004)
- FIFA Club World Cup (2000, 2005–present)

== See also ==
- List of football matches between British clubs in UEFA competitions
- List of Scottish football clubs in the FA Cup
- England–Scotland football rivalry
