= Renton F.C. =

Former association football club in Scotland

Renton
- Full name: Renton Football Club
- Nickname(s): the Dark Blues
- Founded: 1872
- Dissolved: 1922
- Ground: Tontine Park, Renton
from 1882 colours

Renton Football Club was a football club based in Renton, West Dunbartonshire, Scotland. Formed in 1872, it was a prominent team in the early history of Scottish football, and was one of the teams that featured in the first ever Scottish Cup fixture. It won the competition twice, in 1885 and 1888, and was also runners-up three times. Its 6–1 win against Cambuslang in 1888 is the joint record win in a Scottish Cup final.

The club was one of the founding members of the Scottish Football League in 1890, but was expelled soon after for breaching the regulations against professionalism. It returned to the League in 1891, but struggled financially and resigned in 1897. The team continued to play in more minor leagues before finally folding in 1922.

Renton were one of the first clubs to win the Football World Championship when in 1888, as Scottish Cup holders, it challenged and beat the FA Cup holders West Bromwich Albion. In its existence, the club produced 13 internationalists in 11 years.

== History ==
Dunbartonshire was a hotbed of the game in the early years of organised football in Scotland, with the county's three leading clubs of the era, Dumbarton, Renton and Vale of Leven all forming in 1872, emerging out of shinty clubs in local factories who were turned to the association game by the influence of Queen's Park F.C. Renton's side was formed by employees of William Stirling & Sons, the dye factory of Alexander Wylie, who provided the club with finance and support.

Although not one of the founder members of the Scottish Football Association in 1873, Renton joined the body in time to enter the inaugural (1873–74) Scottish Cup tournament, and on 18 October 1873 was one of the clubs involved in the first day of competition for the new trophy. Renton faced Kilmarnock on neutral territory at Crosshill, Glasgow, winning 2–0. Although full details of the matches played are difficult to ascertain, it is generally believed that this was the first of the three games played that day to kick off, and therefore the first official competitive football match to take place in Scotland. Renton went on to reach the semi-final, losing to eventual winners Queen's Park. The following season they went one step further, reaching the final, but again lost to Queen's Park, by 3–0.

=== The glory years ===
During the 1880s Renton was amongst the most powerful clubs in the country. It lifted the Scottish Cup for the first time in 1885, beating local rivals Vale of Leven in the final. The 1886 final once again ended in defeat against Queen's Park, but Renton lifted the trophy for a second time in 1888 with an emphatic 6–1 win over Cambuslang, a winning margin that has never been exceeded in a Scottish Cup final. During this period, Renton also lifted another prestigious trophy of the era, the Glasgow Merchants' Charity Cup, four years in succession. During season 1886–87, Renton competed in the FA Cup. It defeated Accrington 1–0 at home in the first round. Following a 2–2 draw at home in the second round, it beat Blackburn Rovers 2–0 in a replay. Preston ended their FA Cup run in the third round, winning 2–0 at Renton.

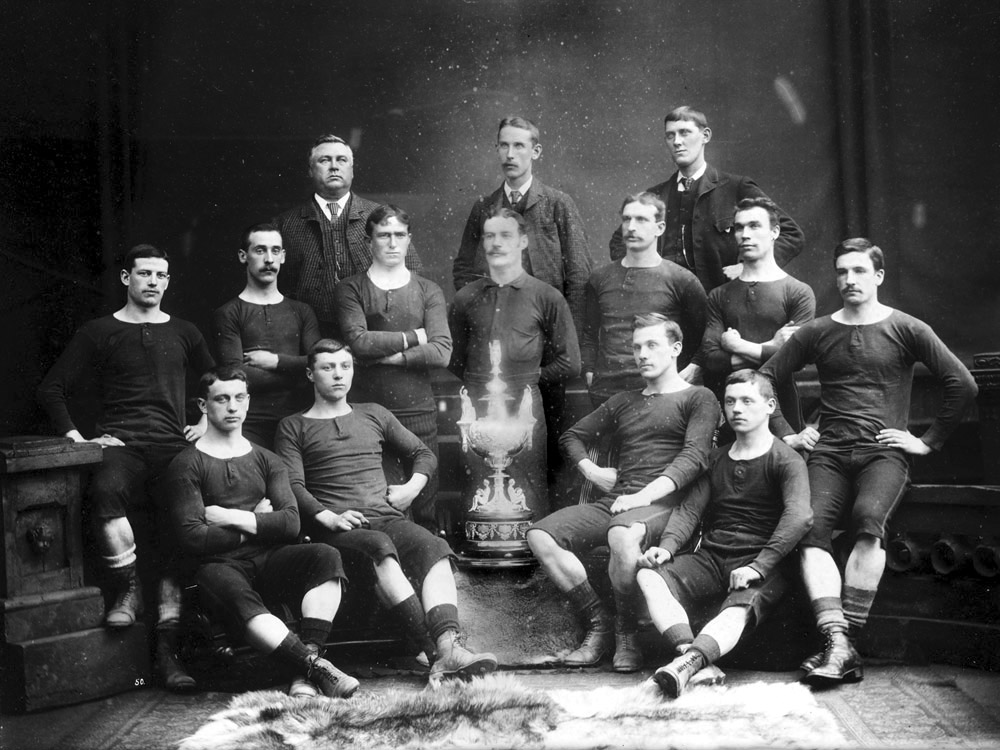
Renton 1888–89 team

Three months after their second Scottish Cup triumph, Renton returned to the scene, the second Hampden Park in Glasgow, to face FA Cup holders West Bromwich Albion in a challenge match billed as being for the "Championship of the United Kingdom and the World". The fixture was really no more than a friendly organised between the clubs, without any direct sanction from the respective national associations. Given there were no league competitions as yet, a meeting between the English and Scottish Cup winners could reasonably lay some claim to deciding the leading club in the UK (albeit without any opportunity for the Welsh or Irish equivalents to compete). When Renton won the World Cup, the footballing world was in its infancy in 1888, almost exclusively played by Scottish and English clubs. It was a World Cup Championship by default – nevertheless Renton's claim is undisputed. A “Champion of the World” sign was proudly displayed on the pavilion at Tontine Park. The trophy can be found in the Hampden Park museum.

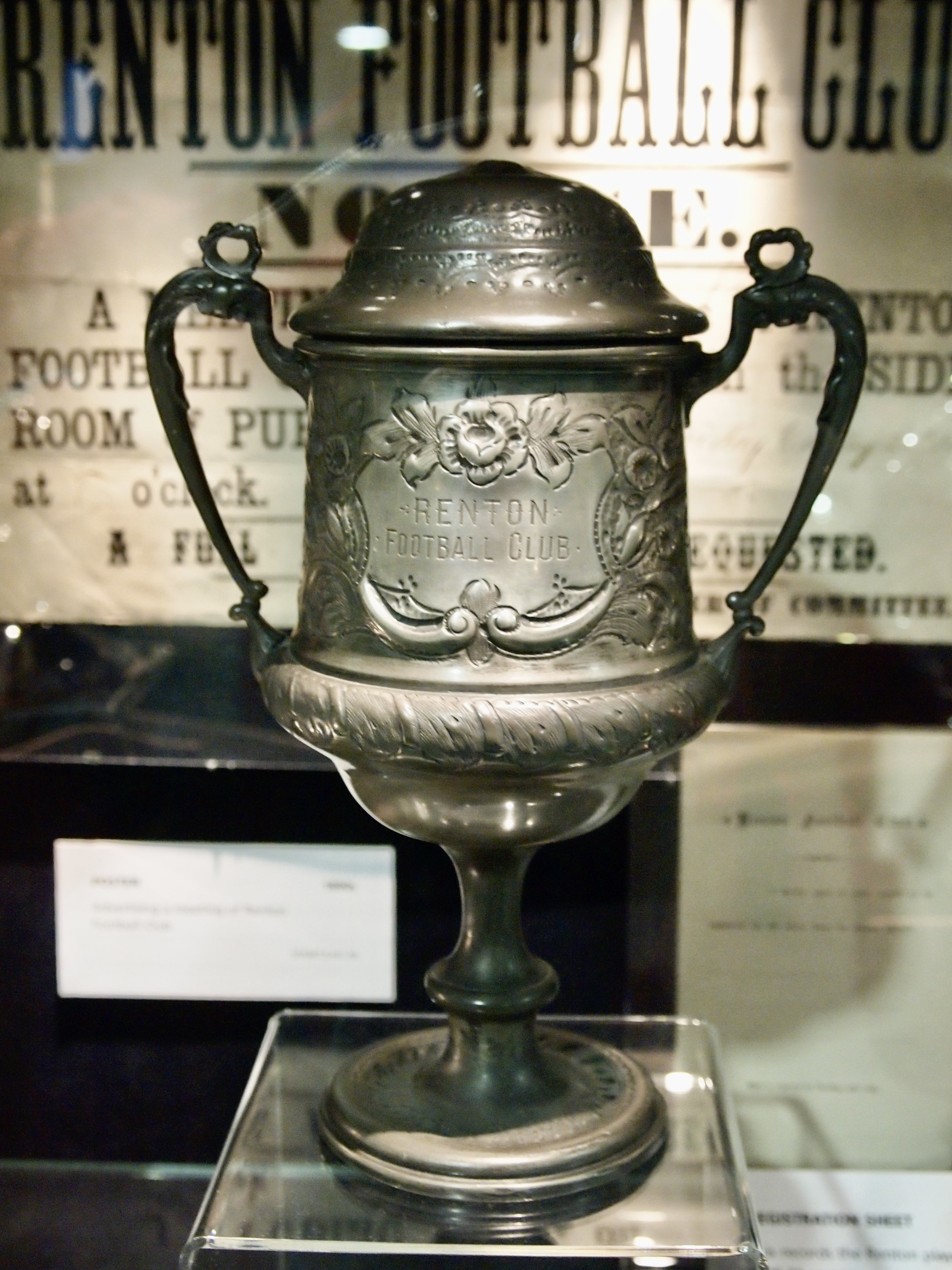
The small pewter trophy commissioned by Renton F.C. to commemorate their victories in the 1887–88 season.

=== Scottish League ===
The formation of the Football League proved disastrous for Renton, as, before the 1889–90 season, 9 of their first team players had left for English clubs. In 1890, Renton were one of the eleven founder members of the Scottish Football League, the meeting which led to the establishment of the new competition having been instigated by Renton club secretary Peter Fairly.

The club's first experience of League competition was to be cut short a month into the 1890–91 season, however, by a disastrous run of events. The club lost in the first round of the 1890–91 Scottish Cup, 2–1 at Kilsyth Wanderers, the result being considered the biggest shock in Cup history. With no second round tie, the club filled the gap with a friendly against a team billed as "Edinburgh Saints". This was in reality St Bernard's, which had been suspended following allegations of professionalism, in thin disguise. As a result of this Renton was suspended from all football.

Renton successfully sued the SFA to have its suspension lifted and subsequently resumed its place in the Scottish League for 1891–92. The St Bernard's case illustrated the growing creep of illegal professionalism in Scottish football, a trend no doubt encouraged by the introduction of regular league competition, and one which was to lead to the decline of small town or village clubs, who could never hope to match the financial muscle of the big city clubs.

At the end of the 1893–94 season — the first season after the legalisation of professionalism in Scotland — Renton was relegated to the League's Division Two, never to return to the top level. They continued to run into trouble with the authorities, failing to turn up for their away fixture against Dundee Wanderers in 1894–95, in favour of playing a more lucrative friendly against Queen's Park. The points were therefore awarded to the Wanderers. The club was more rigorous in its attention to that season's Scottish Cup, however, reaching the final for the fifth (and as it turned out, last) time. Once more pitted against the opposition that had embroiled them in their earlier brush with officialdom — St Bernard's — Renton lost out by a 2–1 scoreline.

=== Decline ===
Despite this appearance back in the national spotlight, Renton's time in the Scottish League was drawing to a close. In common with Vale of Leven and Dumbarton, the amateur game had favoured Renton, as the clubs all had backing from factories in the area; players could be de facto professionals by taking a factory wage for playing football - something that was common in England - and gaining an advantage over clubs whose players had full-time jobs.

However, once professionalism was allowed, gate money for the biggest clubs easily outstripped the money available from private company backers. Financial hardship began to hit deeply for a club only ever capable of drawing a few hundred spectators to home matches; at one point, the club had even considered relocating to Glasgow as a solution to their problems (where its appearance had always drawn thousands). Its league career ended four games into the 1897–98 season when, unable to meet its financial guarantees, it tendered its resignation. This was accepted, with Hamilton Academical taking on Renton's remaining fixtures – less than a decade after Renton's "world championship". The club continued to play in a variety of minor senior leagues – mainly the Western League along with their derby rivals Vale of Leven before finally folding in 1922 (not 1921 as sometimes stated) – it entered the 1922–23 Scottish Qualifying Cup, but scratched to Hamilton Garrison.

Its final hour of fame came in the Scottish Cup of 1906–07 when it put out St Bernard's – then leading Division Two – after two draws, and then stunned Scottish football by putting out Dundee, which was to finish second in Division One that year. It finally went out to Queen's Park in the quarter-finals of the competition.

== Colours ==
The club's initial colours were red/scarlet and white striped (in the context of the time, this refers to hooped) jerseys and blue knickerbockers. In 1882 the club changed to red and blue, possibly as all dark blue with red trim, as in 1886 it described its colours as dark blue jerseys, and dark blue knickers with red stripes.

The club retained dark blue for the rest of its existence, and was so attached to it that when playing local rivals Vale of Leven refused to change the jerseys; in the Glasgow Charity Cup final in 1886, the only difference between the sides was that Renton donned white knickers, and in the 1887–88 Dumbartonshire Cup final the Vale was ordered to wear the white jerseys of the Dumbartonshire Association.

== Stadium ==
The club originally played on a public park close to Renton railway station at the north end of the village. In 1877, the club moved to South Park, 500 yards from the station, and in 1878 to Tontine Park, which remained the club's ground for the rest of its existence. After the club's demise, the ground was built over for housing in 1928, with the former location of the centre circle being commemorated in one of the gardens.

== Noted players ==
Twelve Renton players were chosen to represent Scotland between 1885 and 1896. The club's international players were as follows:

- Alexander Barbour
- Harry Campbell
- Robert Glen
- Andrew Hannah
- James Kelly
- Bob Kelso
- John Lindsay
- Archie McCall
- James McCall
- Neil McCallum
- William McColl
- John Murray

== Honours ==
- Scottish Cup:
  - Winners: 1884–85, 1887–88
  - Runners-up: 1874–75, 1885–86, 1894–95

=== Other Honours ===
League

- Scottish Combination
  - Runners-up: 1902–03, 1903–04
- Western League
  - Runners-up: 1917–18

County

- Dumbartonshire Cup:
  - Winners: 1887, 1896, 1908, 1909, 1914
  - Runners-up: 1888, 1895, 1899, 1900, 1905, 1912, 1913, 1920
- Dumbartonshire & District League
  - Runners-up: 1902

Charity

- Glasgow Merchants Charity Cup:
  - Winners: 1886, 1887, 1888, 1889
- East End Catholic Charity Cup:
  - Winners: 1887

Other

- Football World Championship:
  - Champions: 1888
- Dumbartonshire 2nd XI Cup:
  - Winners: 1886, 1887
  - Runners-up: 1888
- Mavisbank Tournament
  - Winners: 1887

== Footnotes ==
Sources

- Crampsey, Bob (1990). The First 100 Years. Glasgow: Scottish Football League. ISBN 0-9516433-0-4.
- Smailes, Gordon (1995). The Breedon Book of Scottish Football Records. Derby: Breedon Books. ISBN 1-85983-020-X.
- Twydell, Dave (1997). Rejected F.C. of Scotland (Volume 3). Harefield, Middlesex: Yore Publications. ISBN 1-874427-17-8.
- Currie, David. "Renton Crowned World Champions". A Sporting Nation. BBC Sport Scotland.
