= Archie McCall =

Scottish footballer

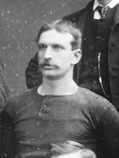
McCall in 1888.

Archibald McCall (8 May 1867 – 17 April 1936) was a Scottish footballer, who played for Renton and Scotland.
