= James McCall (footballer) =

Scottish footballer

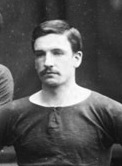
McCall in 1888

James McCall (2 March 1865 - 16 February 1925) was a Scottish footballer who played for Renton and Scotland.

== Sources ==
- Smith, Paul (2013). Scotland Who's Who. Pitch Publishing. ISBN 9781909178847.
