= Cambuslang F.C. =

Former association football club in Scotland

- Full name: Cambuslang Football Club
- Nickname: the Villagers
- Founded: 1874
- Dissolved: 1897
- Ground: Whitefield Park; Cambuslang; South Lanarkshire
Home colours	Away colours

Cambuslang Football Club was a Scottish football club, based in the Cambuslang area of Lanarkshire (in modern Greater Glasgow). Cambuslang was one of the founding members of the Scottish Football League, but left the league after just two seasons.

== History ==
The club was founded in 1874. The new football club was named Excelsior with a pitch being laid out in Cambuslang Public Park, known locally as Bogshole Park.

The new club were challenged by the lads from the village of Halfway to play for the right to call themselves Cambuslang, so the Excelsior team went to Halfway and in their first match at Clyde Street Park won by the scoreline of 6–0; from then on the Excelsior name was scratched and Cambuslang Football and Athletic Club were formed.

In 1879 at a meeting at the Cross Hotel in Hamilton the secretary of Cambuslang was joined by those of Airdrie, Airdriehill, Drumpellier, Hamilton Academical, Glengowan, Clydebank, Uddingston, West Benhar, Benhar and Stonelaw where it was agreed that each club would pay 10 shillings (50p) towards a county cup and the new district would be known as the Lanarkshire County Football Association. Cambuslang won Lanarkshire Cup in 1883–84 and 1884–85, the latter by beating Benhar 5–3 in a replay in front of 2,500 at Hamilton. The club was also runner -up four times before falling out with the Lanarkshire Football Association and joining the Glasgow Football Association for the 1887–88 season; the club officially left the Lanarkshire Association, while Mr Park a club board member, also stepped down as the association president, in March 1887, and an attempt to bring the club back into the Lanarkshire fold before the new season foundered. For the new season the club also moved to a new ground, Whitefield Park, opening with a match against Dumbarton Athletic in August.

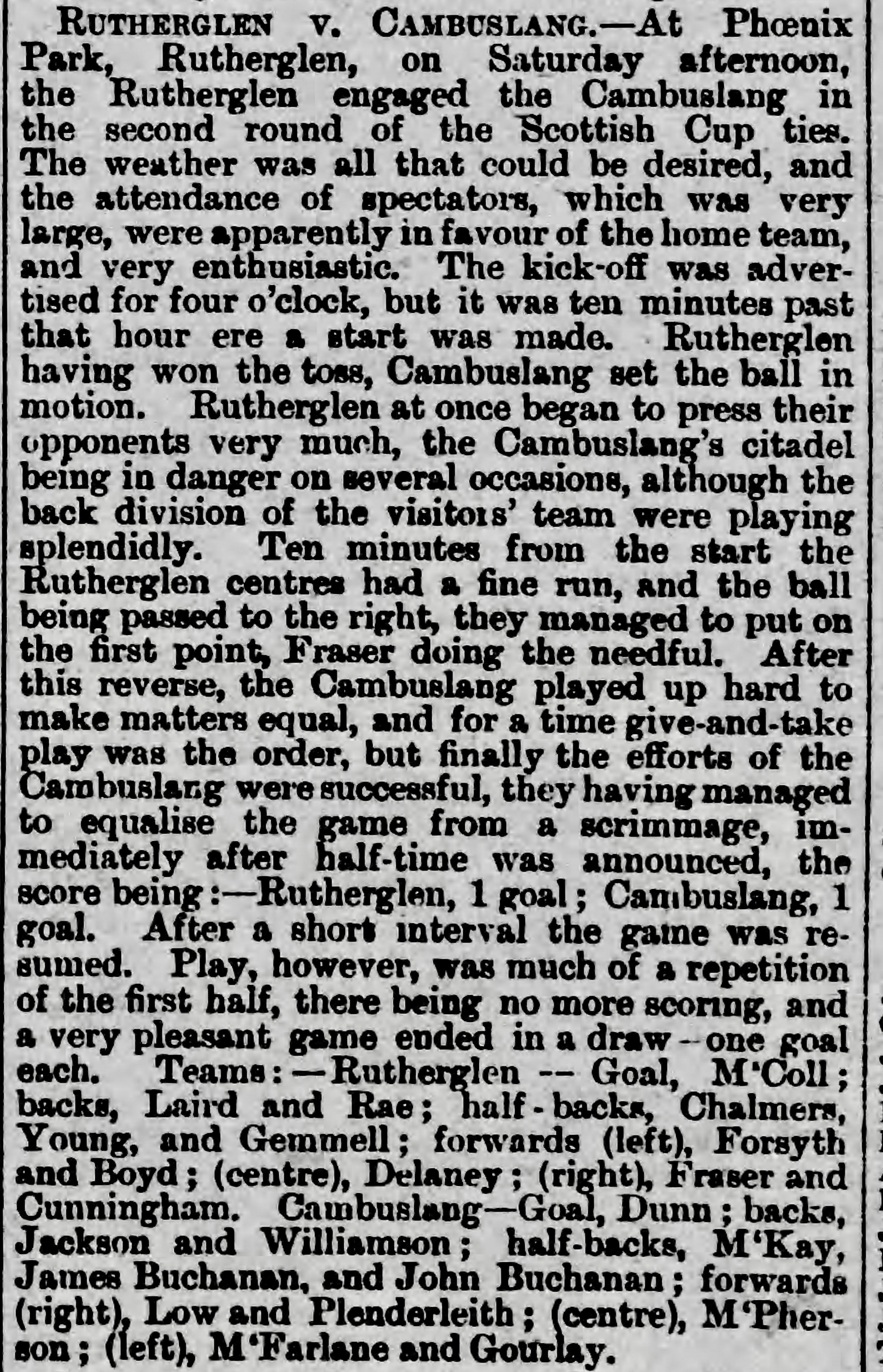
Report of the club's 1–1 draw with Rutherglen in the 2nd round of the 1886–87 Scottish Cup, Rutherglen Reformer, 8 October 1886

Cambuslang reached the Scottish Cup Final in 1888, having beaten Abercorn 10–1 in a semi-final replay after a 1–1 draw with a goal from Billy Mortimer, but lost the final 6–1 to Renton in what remains the joint-largest margin in the competition's history (matched in 1972). The two clubs also met in the final of the Glasgow Charity Cup three months later, Renton winning 4–0. In between, however, Cambuslang had the consolation of winning the inaugural Glasgow Cup, beating Rangers 3–1 in the final in front of 12,000 at Hampden Park.

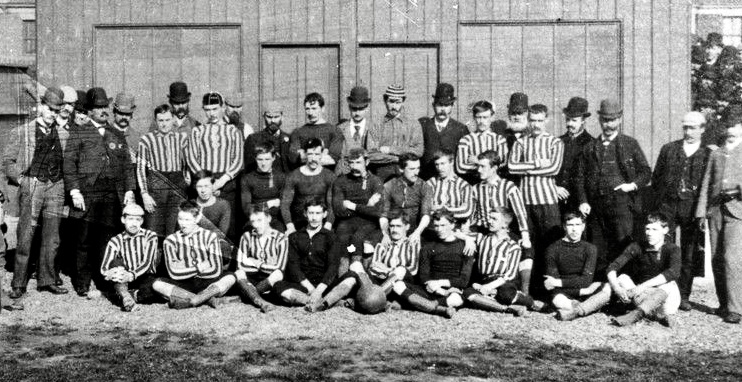
Sunderland v Cambuslang (dark shirts), photographed together at the Newcastle Road ground, 8 September 1888

Cambuslang joined the Scottish Football League at its inauguration in 1890 and finished fourth in the 1890–91 season. The club finished last in the eleven team league in 1891–92, however, and did not seek re-election to the league. They made no effort to re-join the league when it added a Second Division.

Cambuslang's demise came at the end of the 1896–97 season, playing in the Scottish Alliance League.

The Junior team Cambuslang Rangers have nothing whatsoever to do with the former defunct club but they shared the ground for the first year in 1896–97 before moving on. They were called Cambuslang Rovers from 1896 to 1899 before changing to Rangers in 1899 (they were a merger of three local Junior teams), the other junior side was Cambuslang Hibernian who were formed in 1884 and used Bogshole, later renamed Mains Park.

== Stadium ==
- 1874–1876 Bogshole
- 1876–1887 Westburn Green/Westburn Park
- 1887–1897 Whitefield Park

== Colours ==
The club played in dark blue, with varying amounts of white (knickers in 1874, knickers and socks from 1879 to 1886, and knickers again from 1893 to the club's end). The club's change kit was white shirts, which it used in its Scottish Cup final appearance.

== Honours ==
- Scottish Cup: Runners-up 1887–88
- Lanarkshire Cup: 1884, 1885
- Glasgow Cup: 1888
- Glasgow Charity Cup: runners-up 1888

== See also ==
- Category:Cambuslang F.C. players

== Sources ==
- Bob Crampsey (1990). The First 100 Years. Scottish Football League. ISBN 0-9516433-0-4.
