= Cathkin Park =

Municipal park in Glasgow, Scotland

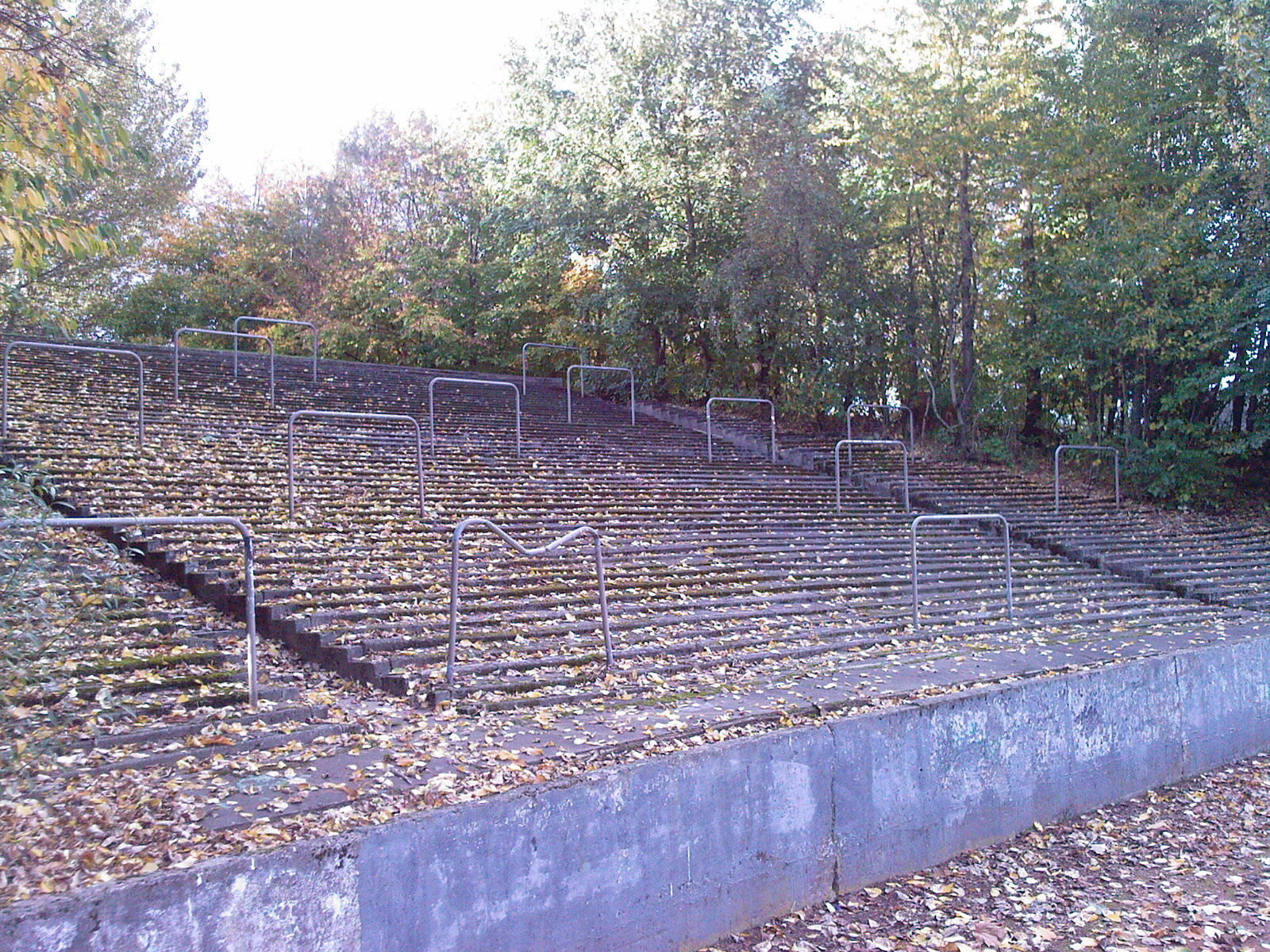

- Location in Glasgow
- Former names: Hampden Park (1884 – 1903)
- Location: Glasgow, Scotland
- Coordinates: 55°49′48″N 4°15′12″W
- Capacity: 50,000
- Surface: Grass
- Record attendance: 51,518

Construction
- Opened: 1884; 142 years ago
- Closed: 1967; 59 years ago

Tenants
- Queen's Park (1884–1903); Third Lanark (1903–1967)

Cathkin Park is a municipal park in Glasgow, Scotland. The park is maintained by the city's parks department, and it is a public place where football is still played. The park contains the site of the second Hampden Park, previously home to the football clubs Queen's Park (from 1884 to 1903) and Third Lanark (from 1903 to 1967). The site of the original Hampden Park is just to the west.

== Football ground ==
The park formerly contained a football stadium, which had played host to organised football since 1884. It was originally known as Hampden Park (the second by that name, succeeding the original Hampden Park) and was rented by Queen's Park between 1884 and 1903; the club dismantled their pavilion from the old ground and rebuilt it at the new site, playing some matches at Titwood until it was ready. The first match, a goalless draw against Dumbarton, was played on 18 October 1884 watched by 7,000. As Hampden Park, the ground hosted seven Scottish Cup finals (plus two replays) between 1885 and 1899, as well as several finals of the Glasgow Cup and Glasgow Merchants Charity Cup, the 'unofficial World Championship' club challenge match in 1888, and nine Scotland international fixtures between 1885 and 1890. A single rugby union international (which usually took place in Edinburgh) was played there: Scotland defeated England in the 1896 Home Nations Championship in front of 20,000 spectators.

At the turn of the 20th century, Queen's Park decided to build their own stadium and in 1903 moved to the third (and current) Hampden Park on open ground about 500 yards (460 m) further south. Third Lanark took over the lease of the existing ground which they renamed New Cathkin Park as they had previously played at another stadium named Cathkin Park about 500 yards (460 m) north of their new home (situated close to Dixon Halls on the east side of Cathcart Road). The two clubs failed to come to an agreement for the sale of the pavilion, which was privately owned while the ground itself was leased; instead Queen's Park attempted unsuccessfully to seek other buyers for an outright purchase, then dismantled it and sold most of the components individually, receiving less income than the value of Third Lanark's original offer (rumours persisted that Queen's Park's pavilion was returned to the site of the first Hampden to be used as the clubhouse for the bowling club established there in 1905, but no evidence was found for this during investigations into the sites' historical significance). Third Lanark then rebuilt the ground virtually from scratch, relocating their grandstand from the old Cathkin Park – this was relatively new, having first been installed in 1891.

During Third Lanark's first season following the move (1903–04, in which they finished as Scottish champions), several home matches were played at the new Hampden while work was carried out on the reconstructed Cathkin Park. No major finals were played at this version of the ground, but it became the regular home of the Home Scots v Anglo-Scots international trial match which ran from the 1890s to the 1920s. Meanwhile the club continued to be a member of the top division of Scottish football for most of the next 60 years.

A new stand was built on the north side of the stadium in 1962, but despite this investment, Third Lanark were soon on the verge of collapse due to financial mismanagement by the hierarchy led by Bill Hiddelston. Their last match at Cathkin took place on 25 April 1967, when they played out a 3–3 draw against Queen of the South. Jimmy Davidson scored one goal for Queens and Brian McMurdo two, including the last senior goal at the park (the Thirds goals came from Kinnaird with two goals and McLaughlan with the other). A Glasgow Challenge Cup Final on 13 May 1967 between two Junior sides, Cambuslang Rangers and Rutherglen Glencairn, (Cambuslang winning 2–0) was the last official football match at Cathkin Park; the final goal came from Cambuslang Rangers forward Peter Coleman after 17 minutes.

Some parts of the new stand were taken to be used at Cliftonhill (including the wooden seats which remain in situ in the 21st century). A tentative proposal for use of the oval-shaped ground by Glasgow Tigers (speedway) team in 1968 fell through when the stand was subjected to an arson attack (one of a spate which also included incidents at Hampden and Ibrox). Thereafter the stadium subsequently fell into disrepair and most of the fabric was gradually removed. Property developers intended to buy the land but a deal was cancelled when it was designated to remain recreational in usage, and it became a municipal park with the pitch at its centre, while the remains of the surrounding terraces from three sides of the ground were never demolished and can still be seen.

A reformed Third Lanark team, participating in the Greater Glasgow Amateur League, played in the park in the early 21st century, as did Hampden AFC and boys team the Jimmy Johnstone Academy. In 2017, Third Lanark A.F.C. announced a £5 million plan to return to Cathkin and redevelop the ground, with an all-weather pitch, a 2000-seat stand, floodlights and community facilities for football and cricket. In the meantime, the latest of several projects to carry out basic renovations on the remaining terracing and barriers by volunteers, including actor Simon Weir, took place in early 2019. The Jimmy Johnstone Academy leased the ground, and received planning permission in December 2023 to fence off the pitch, despite objections from local residents. However, in August 2024, a local resident won a judicial review of Glasgow City Council's decision to grant the planning permission, with the decision deemed unlawful for failing to take account of the Land Reform (Scotland) 2003 Act, known as Scotland's right to roam legislation.

In September 2025, the ground was designated a scheduled monument by Historic Environment Scotland.

== Athletics ==
Hampden Park hosted the Scottish Amateur Athletics Association championships on a number of occasions, starting on Saturday 25 June 1887. E. Latimer Stones (Partick Thistle FC) broke the Scottish record for the pole vault with his winning height of 11 feet (3.35m), and the half mile was won by John Braid (Stanley House Cricket Club) who competed in the Olympic Games in 1900, playing cricket, for France. The championships returned to Hampden Park on Saturday 22 June 1889 when athletes from Clydesdale Harriers won both the 1 mile (Charles Pennycook 4:29 4/5) and 4 miles (John W. McWilliam 20:56 1/5) championships, with both men setting Championship Best performances. James Greig, from Perth, a student at Clare College, Cambridge, won the 120 yard hurdles (16 2/5) and the high jump (5 ft 6in, 1.67m). Greig later became the vice-President of the Scottish AAA. E. Latimer Stones of Ulverston AC returned to defend his pole vault title and set new Scottish All-comers record figures of 11 ft 4in (3.45m). This remained a Scottish All-comers record until 26 July 1924, and a Scottish Native record and Championship Best performance until 27 June 1931 when it was beaten by Patrick Ogilvie of Cambridge University at the other Hampden Park. On Thursday 2 April 1891 the Scottish 10 mile Championship was held at Hampden Park. Andrew Hannah of Clydesdale Harriers won the event for the third successive year, and set Scottish All-comers records at 5 miles (26:35 3/5), 6 miles (32:11 2/5), 7 miles (37:41 4/5), 8 miles (43:13 3/5), 9 miles (48:48 1/5), and 10 miles (54:18 3/5). The only other finisher was William Carment (Edinburgh H.) in 58:12 4/5. Hannah would eventually win this title a record seven times between 1889 and 1896. On Saturday 20 June 1891 the Scottish Amateur Athletics Championships returned to Hampden Park when David Duncan, a former pupil of Royal High School in Edinburgh and a former President of the Scottish AAA won the 1 mile for the fifth time representing Edinburgh Harriers. Duncan won the 1 mile at the first four Championships from 1883 to 1886.

There had for a number of years been a disagreement in Scottish athletics over whether professional cycle racing events should be allowed at amateur athletics meetings. There were strong views both in favour and against the position, and arriving at a deadlock in their negotiations several western district clubs in favour of allowing professional cycle events, led by Clydesdale Harriers, seceded from the Scottish AAA and formed the Scottish Amateur Athletics Union (SAAU). The consequence of this was that there were two national championships in both 1895 and 1896 held under the auspices of the two separate bodies. In 1895 they were both held on the same day in the same city, at the grounds of opposing football clubs, and if attendance is anything to go by the Scottish public made their feeling on the topic abundantly clear. Over 6,000 fans attended the breakaway SAAU championships at Hampden Park where Robert Langlands of Clydesdale Harriers became the first Scottish athlete to break two minutes for 880 yards, whilst barely 1000 spectators saw Mrs McNab, the wife of the Hon. Secretary SAAA, present the prizes at Ibrox Park where Alfred Downer (Scottish Pelicans) won the 100 yards, 220 yards, and 440 yards titles for the third consecutive year.

On Saturday, 27 June 1896 the Scottish AAU Championships returned to Hampden Park when two men from Clydesdale Harriers set Scottish Native records in winning their events. William Robertson won the mile in 4:27 1/5 and Stewart Duffus won the 4 miles in 20:10 4/5.

== Gallery ==
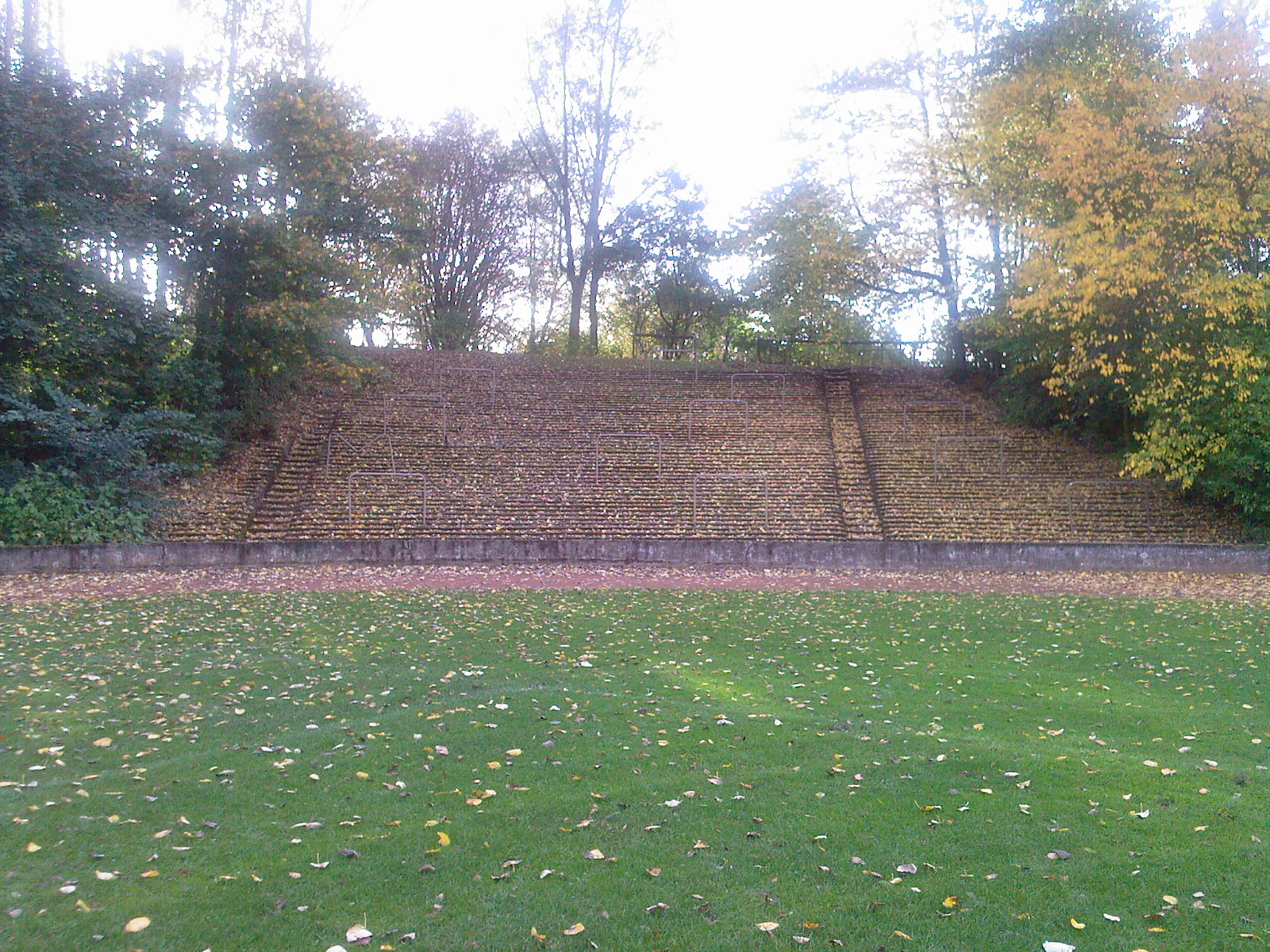
A view of one of the terraces from the pitch

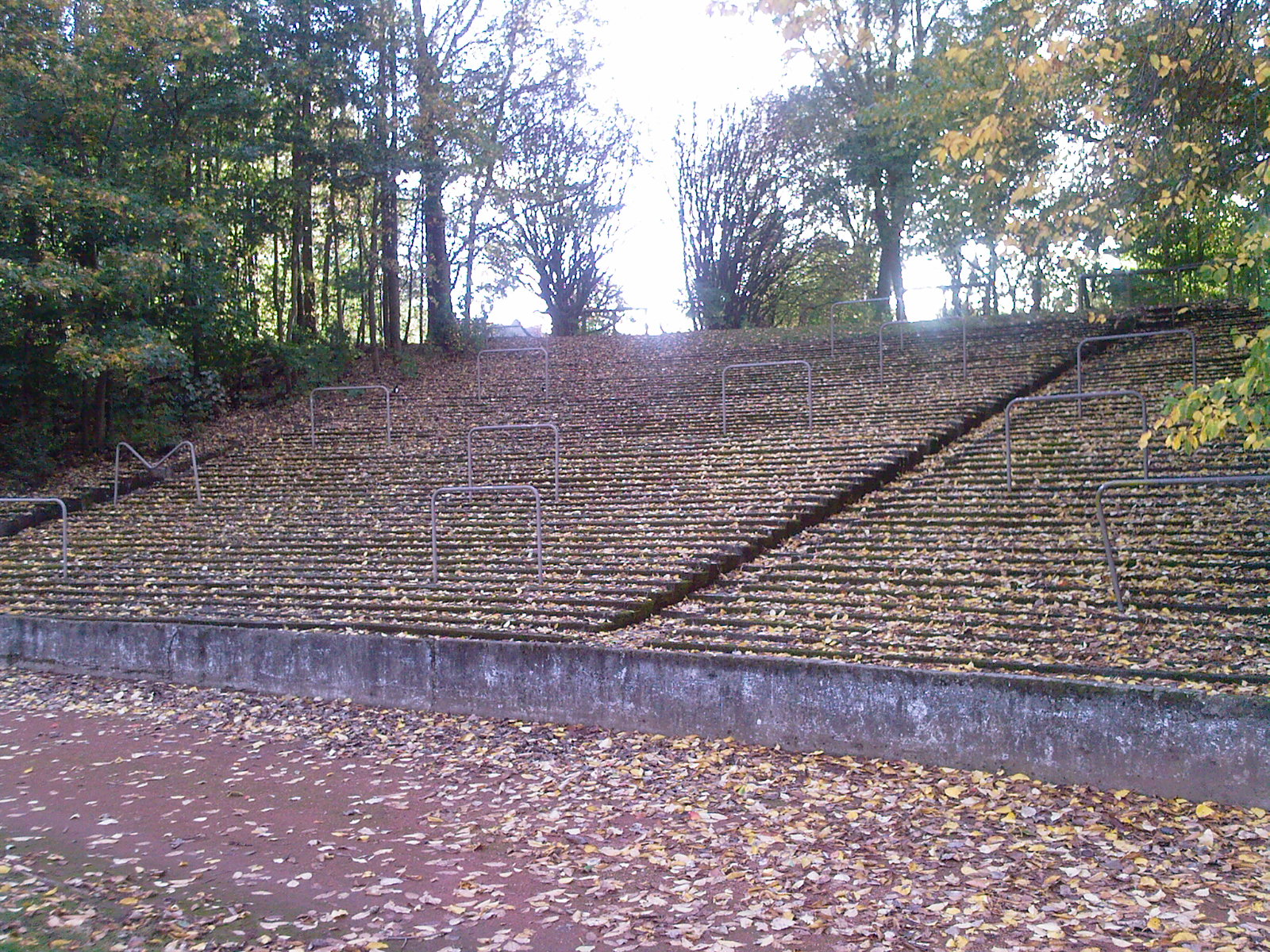
Close view of an abandoned terrace

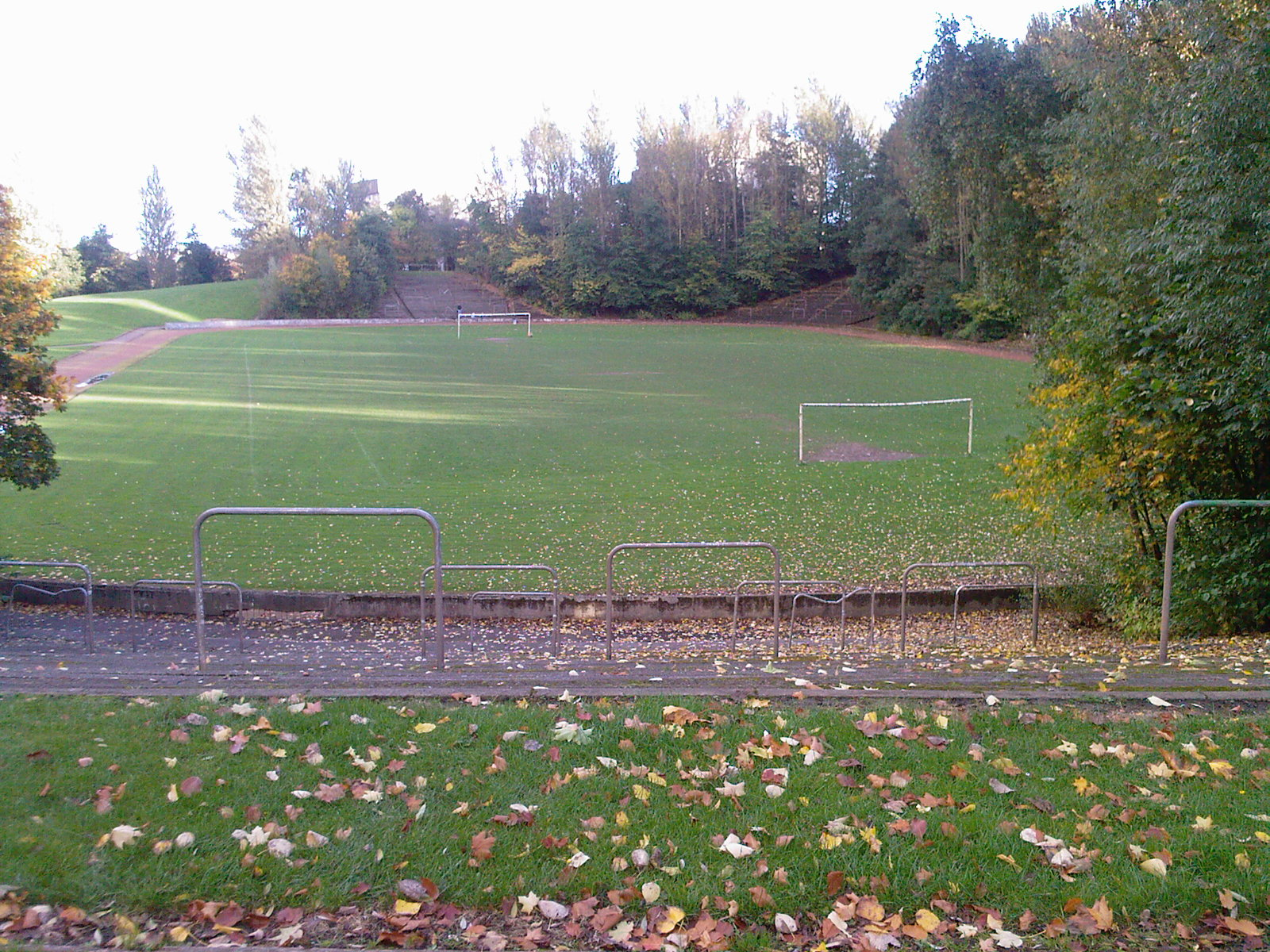
View from the back of the terrace with the pitch and other terraces visible
