= List of Third Lanark A.C. players =

Third Lanark Athletic Club was a football club based in Glasgow, Scotland founded in 1872. Initially known as 3rd Lanarkshire Rifle Volunteers, they were founder members of the Scottish Football League in 1890, having won the Scottish Cup a year earlier. League champions in 1904, they won the Scottish Cup again in 1905 and spent 58 seasons out of a total of 70 in the top tier, before rapidly declining amidst financial mismanagement and going out of business in 1967.

The following list consists of Third Lanark players who meet at least one of the following criteria:

- Played in 100 Scottish Football League matches for the club
- Member of squad that won the Scottish League title in 1903–04
- Member of team that won the Scottish Cup (1889 and 1905)
- Member of team that played on the losing side in a major cup final (1876, 1878, 1906, 1936, 1959)
- Member of team that won the Glasgow Cup (1902, 1903, 1908, 1963) or Glasgow Merchants Charity Cup (1890, 1898, 1901, 1952, 1954, 1956)
- Played for the Scotland national football team while registered with the club
- Played for the Scottish Football League XI while registered with the club

The only player who achieved all of the above was Hughie Wilson, a member of the successful 1900s group – three of his teammates also claimed winner's medals from each of the four trophies available at the time. By contrast, prominent players of later eras like Tommy McInally, Felix Staroscik and Alex Harley did not meet any of the criteria. Goalkeeper Jimmy Brownlie is the club record holder for appearances, Scotland caps and SFL caps, all by some margin. The record goalscorer is Neil Dewar.

For a list of all Third Lanark players with a Wikipedia article, see Category:Third Lanark A.C. players.

== List of players ==
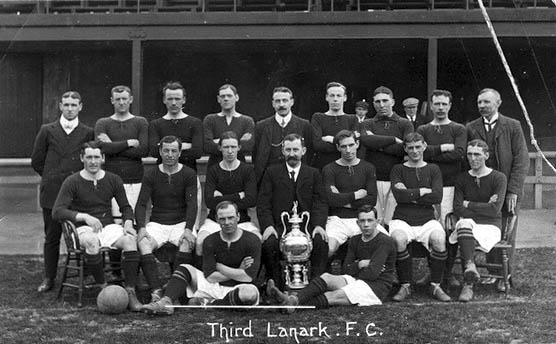
Third Lanark's squad of the early 1900s was the most successful in the club's 95-year history

Position Key

GK	Goalkeeper
DF	Full-back / Centre half
MF	Midfielder / Wing half
W	Outside forward /Winger
FW	Inside forward / Centre forward

Name	Pos	Years	Apps	Goals	SD1	CUP	FIN	GLA	GCC	SFA	SFL
Jimmy Brownlie	GK	1906–1923	481	2				Y (Note: 1908–09 Glasgow Cup.)		16	14
Robert Orr	DF	1909–1924	392	31							2
Jocky Robertson	GK	1951–1963	287	0			Y (Note: 1959–60 Scottish League Cup.)	Y (Note: 1962–63 Glasgow Cup.)	Y (Note: 1951–52 Charity Cup (shared with Clyde).) (Note: 1953–54 Charity Cup.) (Note: 1955–56 Charity Cup.)		
James Blair	MF	1930–1944	251	9			Y (Note: 1935–36 Scottish Cup.)				2
Robert Barr	DF	1897–1910	239	1	Y (Note: 1903–04 Scottish Division One.)	Y (Note: 1904–05 Scottish Cup.)	Y (Note: 1905–06 Scottish Cup.)	Y (Note: 1902–03 Glasgow Cup.) (Note: 1903–04 Glasgow Cup.)	Y (Note: 1897–98 Charity Cup.) (Note: 1900–01 Charity Cup.)		
Jimmy Carabine	DF	1931–1946	238	14			Y			3	5
Charlie McCormack	DF	1915–1924	234	4							
Tom Sloan	DF	1900–1914	233	11	Y	Y		Y		1	
Matt Balunas	DF	1946–1955	220	0					Y		
Jimmy Mason	FW	1936–1952	207	34						7	7
Tom Fairfoul	MF	1906–1913	206	27				Y			1
John Cross	MF	1898–1904; 1905–1911	192	21	Y		Y	Y	Y	1	1
Jim Walker	FW	1919–1925	189	7							
Frank Walker	FW	1919–1927	188	68						1	
Neil Dewar	FW	1929–1933; 1937–1940	187	163						3	2
Robert Ferguson	DF	1906–1912	185	7				Y			
Billy Lewis	DF	1956–1964	181	6			Y	Y			
William McIntosh	DF	1901–1910	179	3	Y	Y		Y		1	
Harry Mooney	MF	1946–1954	175	1					Y		
James Simpson	DF	1928–1936	174	0							
James McLellan	MF	1929–1935	171	16							
Isaac Walker	MF	1914–1922	171	3							
Matt Gray	FW	1957–1963	166	94			Y				
James Johnston	W	1901–1907; 1908–1910	166	59	Y	Y	Y	Y	Y		1
Jimmy Harrower	DF	1947–1954	165	2					Y		
Johnny Lynas	W	1929–1935	158	54							
Sam Brown	DF	1922–1928	150	16							
Joe McInnes	W	1956–1963	149	30			Y	Y			
Wattie Dick	MF	1949–1955	148	75					Y		
John Rankin	W	1909–1916	146	32							1
John Hannah	MF	1912–1919	146	5							
John Brown	DF	1955–1960	144	2			Y		Y (Note: Unable to confirm if this was John Brown (on loan from Hibernian) or Bobby Brown (on trial after leaving Motherwell).)		
Jimmy Raeside	GK	1899–1906	143	0	Y	Y	Y	Y	Y	1	
Francis Jack	FW	1928–1933	138	40							
Hughie Wilson	MF	1901–1907	136	37	Y	Y	Y	Y	Y	2	1
Ally MacLeod	W	1949–1955; 1963–1964	136	18					Y		
Jimmy Denmark	DF	1931–1937	134	4			Y				
Joe Breslin	W	1930–1934	129	46							
Bobby Craig	FW	1955–1959	124	61			Y		Y		
Hugh Hamill	FW	1925–1929	124	43							
Colin Mainds	MF	1909–1913	123	5							
Jim Reilly	MF	1959–1963	122	11			Y	Y			
Russell Allan	FW	1918–1921	121	50							
Findlay McGillivray	DF	1959–1965	121	2				Y			
Dave Hilley	FW	1958–1962	117	37			Y				1
Jimmy Goodfellow	MF	1958–1963	117	30				Y			
John Neilson	MF	1899–1900; 1902–1908	116	16	Y	Y	Y	Y			1
Willie Cunningham	MF	1957–1964	114	7			Y	Y			
Bruce Clarke	MF	1928–1934	112	13							
John McCormick	DF	1959–1964	112	0							
James Warden	DF	1927–1934	110	11							1
Adam Forsyth	DF	1951–1956	106	2					Y		
Robert Kennedy	FW	1934–1939	105	45			Y				
Jimmy Simpson	MF	1894–1904	105	4					Y	3	
George Henderson	FW	1947–1953	104	34					Y		
John Clark	DF	1928–1933	104	12							
Robert Muir	GK	1935–1939	104	0			Y				
Jim Little	DF	1962–1967	104	0							
Jimmy McInnes	MF	1935–1938	103	7			Y				
Willie Waugh	GK	1929–1932	103	0							
George Hay	FW	1934–1937	102	86			Y				
Bobby Kennedy	MF	1952–1957	97	6					Y		
Robert Hosie	FW	1908–1915	96	21				Y			
William Blair	MF	1891–1897	91	7						1	
Robert Howe	W	1934–1937	90	19			Y				
Alex Kinnaird	W	1935–1938	81	28			Y				
Robert Thomson	DF	1898–1903	80	1				Y	Y		
James Richardson	FW	1907–1910	79	54				Y			
David Hill	DF	1904–1911	76	0			Y	Y		1	
Jack Kidd	FW	1904–1910	74	15		Y					
Johnny Kelly	DF	1941–1950	74	1							1
Sam Phillips	DF	1952–1956	72	7					Y		
George McCue	DF	1897–1902	72	3					Y		
Bobby Mitchell	W	1942–1949; 1956	70	42					Y (Note: 1955–56 Charity Cup – experienced guest player brought in specifically for this match.)		2
George Dobbie	FW	1951–1957	69	36					Y		
Hugh Smith	DF	1958–1961	68	3					Y		
Pat Gallacher	FW	1934–1936	65	17			Y				
Robert Graham	FW	1902–1904; 1905–1906	61	20	Y		Y	Y			
Joe Davis	DF	1961–1964	59	0				Y			
Rabbie Beveridge	FW	1895–1899	58	22					Y		
John McFie	FW	1907–1911; 1913–1914	58	14					Y		
David Munro	W	1904–1907	57	21		Y	Y				
Robert Barbour	DF	1893–1898	57	4							1
James Comrie	DF	1903–1906	54	15	Y	Y	Y				
Thomas McKenzie	FW	1903–1905	50	29	Y	Y		Y			
Dave Gardner	DF	1894–1899	50	1					Y	1	
Willie Barclay	W	1952–1956	49	4					Y		
Robert Downie	GK	1888–1893	48	0		Y (Note: 1888–89 Scottish Cup.)			Y (Note: 1889–90 Charity Cup.)	1	
Bob Hamilton	DF	1935–1937	47	1			Y				
Andrew Thomson	DF	1888–1894	45	2		Y			Y	1	1
William Johnstone	FW	1884–1894	44	14		Y			Y	3	
Willie Wardrope	W	1902–1904	42	14	Y			Y			1
Jimmy McMorran	FW	1962–1964	41	8				Y			
George McCallum	DF	1958–1962	41	0			Y				
Johnny Campbell	FW	1903–1906	40	12	Y			Y			
Jimmy Duncan	MF	1951–1956	40	1					Y		
Thomas Gibbons	FW	1897–1900	36	10					Y		
Alex Milne	GK	1896–1900	34	0					Y		
James Gillespie	W	1897–1902	32	10						1	1
Andrew Lynn	W	1900–1902	32	7					Y		
Alec Smith	MF	1897–1898; 1900–1903	31	0					Y		
Herbert Banks	MF	1897–1899	28	5					Y		
Tommy Wark	FW	1955–1957	27	16					Y		
Willie Cross	W	1901–1903; 1909–1910	26	6					Y		
Bob Johnstone	W	1897–1899	25	12					Y		
William Love	MF	1888–1893	25	2					Y		
John Fyfe	W	1894–1896	24	10						1	
Sammy Baird	MF	1962–1963	24	1				Y			
Bobby Kerr	FW	1953–1955	23	18					Y		
Jimmy Hannah	W	1888–1889; 1897–1899	23	3		Y			Y	1	
Jimmy Muir	FW	1950–1951; 1953–1954	19	1					Y		
Ian Goodall	W	1950–1952	18	7					Y		
James Burke	FW	1889–1892	18	5					Y		
William Lapsley	FW	1889–1892	18	2					Y		
Ian Gordon	DF	1955–1957	18	0				Y			
Ian Spence	FW	1962–1963	17	4				Y			
William Maxwell	FW	1901–1902	16	10							1
William Thomson	FW	1885–1892	16	9					Y		
Andrew Stewart	W	1893–1895	16	8						1	
Henry Boyd	FW	1893–1894	15	6							1
Robert McFarlane	MF	1888–1892	14	2		Y			Y		
Rab Macfarlane	GK	1896–1897	14	0							1
Lawrie Bell	FW	1894–1895	13	7							1
Alex Lochhead	MF	1888–1891; 1892–1893	13	0		Y			Y	1	
William Porter	W	1899–1901	11	3							1
John Rae	DF	1887–1890; 1893–1894	11	0		Y			Y	2	
George Prior	FW	1902–1903	10	2				Y			
Ian Hilley	W	1959–1960	5	3			Y				
Peter Dallas	FW	1955–1957	2	1					Y		
Jimmy Oswald	FW	1888–1889; 1893	1	0		Y				1	
John Auld	DF	1884; 1885–1890	0	0		Y				3	
John Marshall	W	1883–1890	0	0		Y			Y	4	
John Oswald	FW	1888–1889	0	0		Y					
John Hunter	DF	1875–1880	0	0			Y (Note: 1875–76 Scottish Cup.) (Note: 1877–78 Scottish Cup.)			4	
William Miller	W	1875–1878	0	0			Y			1	
John Wallace	GK	1875–1879	0	0			Y				
Archie Hunter	FW	1877–1878	0	0			Y				
John Kay	FW	1877–1878	0	0			Y			(Note: His SFA profile states he 'returned to Third Lanark in 1883', but contemporary match reports of his 3 Scotland appearances of that time list him as a Queen's Park player.)	
Sandy Kennedy	DF	1877–1884	0	0			Y			3	
Jimmy Lang	FW	1877–1879	0	0			Y			1	
Willie Reid	FW	1905	0	0			Y				
William Somers	DF	1877–1879	0	0			Y			2	
Robert Walker	W	1875–1877	0	0			Y				
T. Scoular	FW	1875–1876	0	0			Y				
J. Watson	DF	1874–1882	0	0			Y				
P. White	MF	1875–1876	0	0			Y				
J.G. Crichton	FW	1875–1876	0	0			Y				
David Davidson	MF	1876–1877	0	0			Y				
William Drinnan	FW	1875–1876	0	0			Y				
A. McCririck	W	1877–1878	0	0			Y				
J. McDonald	FW	1875–1876	0	0			Y				
John McKenzie	MF	1877–1879	0	0			Y				
William Peden	FW	1877–1878	0	0			Y				
James McAdam	W	1878–1883	0	0						1	
John Weir	MF	1884–1887	0	0						1	
Alec Robertson	FW	1898–1902	0	0					Y		
Tommy Docherty	MF	1956	0	0					Y		
Ivor Broadis	FW	1956	0	0					Y		
