= List of Third Lanark A.C. seasons =

This is a list of Third Lanark A.C. seasons in Scottish football, from their foundation in 1872 to their dissolution in 1967. It details the club's achievements in senior league and cup competitions and the top scorers for each season, where known.

Third Lanark were formed in 1872, playing at the original Cathkin Park in Glasgow's Crosshill neighbourhood. The club soon became members of the Scottish Football Association and initially began competing in the Scottish Cup from its first season in 1873. They played in the inaugural season of the Scottish Football League, in 1890–91 where they finished in 5th place. In their early years, Thirds existed in the shadow of their neighbours Queen's Park, and even took over the Spiders home ground Hampden Park in 1903 – renaming it New Cathkin Park – when Queen's Park moved out to a larger replacement further south (which was also named Hampden Park and is the earliest version of the extant stadium bearing that name). By the time of the stadium move, Third Lanark had already won the Scottish Cup (in 1889) and celebrated their new surroundings by winning the League Championship for what would prove to be the only time in the 1903–04 season. Another cup win followed in 1905, but from then on, major honours would elude them as the other Glasgow clubs Rangers and Celtic became increasingly more successful and popular, although they reached further finals and maintained their presence in the top division for the majority of the next 60 years.

Third Lanark reached the 1959 Scottish League Cup Final, losing to Heart of Midlothian, and finished in third place in the 1960–61 Scottish League. However, despite winning the Glasgow Cup for the fourth time and building a new stand at their ground in 1963, they suffered relegation two years later. A drop in spectator numbers and financial mismanagement and possible embezzlement led to them being liquidated just two years later in 1967. Their rapid demise was in stark contrast to the fortunes of their old Glasgow rivals that year, as Celtic finished that season as European champions, Rangers also reached the final of the Cup Winners' Cup and Clyde finished in third place behind the Old Firm.

The club's Cathkin Park home still exists as a municipal park surrounded by crumbling remains of the terracing.

== Seasons ==
Season	League										Cup / other competitions					Top goalscorer (Note: Goals in all competitions are counted, where available.)	
Season	∆	Division	P	W	D	L	F	A	Pts	Pos	Scot	Lge (Note: Scottish War Emergency Cup 1939–40, Scottish Southern League Cup 1940–46 and Scottish League Cup 1946–67.)	Glas	Char	Other (Note: Other competitions recorded: English FA Cup 1885–87, Glasgow Football League 1895–99 and 1904–06, Inter City Football League 1899–04, War Fund Shield 1914–15 and 1917–18, Victory Cup 1919, Scottish War Emergency Cup 1939–40, Summer Cup 1940–46 and 1963–65, Saint Mungo Cup 1951 and Franco Scottish Cup 1961–62.)	Player	Gls
1873–74	—	— (Note: Scottish League football did not start until 1890 when the Scottish Football League was formed.)								—	QF	— (Note: No league cup competition was held until 1940.)	— (Note: The Glasgow Cup was first contested in the 1887–88 season.)	— (Note: The Glasgow Merchants' Charity Cup was first contested in the 1878–79 season.)	—	W. Dick	1 (Note: W. Dick captained the side and scored their only goal of the game in their Scottish Cup quarter-final draw with Clydesdale. The replay ended 0–0 and Thirds lost the second replay 2–0, making Dick's goal the only one scored in competition by the club in 1873–74.)
1874–75	—	—								—	QF	—	—	—	—	—	—
1875–76	—	—								—	F (Note: Thirds reached their first Scottish Cup final in 1876, losing 2–0 to Glasgow rivals Queen's Park in a replay after the original tie had ended in a 1–1 draw.)	—	—	—	—	—	—
1876–77	—	—								—	R3	—	—	R1 (Note: 3rd Lanark RV lost 3–0 to Queen's Park in the first round of the inaugural Glasgow Merchants' Charity Cup. The first round tie was essentially the semi-final, as the winners reached the final, as was the case until the 1901–02 competition.)	—	—	—
1877–78	—	—								—	F (Note: Thirds reached their second Scottish Cup final in 1878 but again failed to win, this time losing 1–0 to Vale of Leven.)	—	—	R1 (Note: Despite winning their first round tie 2–1 against Rangers, Thirds later scratched from the Glasgow Merchants' Charity Cup and did not play in the final.)	—	—	—
1878–79	—	—								—	R5	—	—	R1	—	—	—
1879–80	—	—								—	R1	—	—	DNE	—	—	—
1880–81	—	—								—	R1	—	—	DNE	—	—	—
1881–82	—	—								—	R1	—	—	DNE	—	—	—
1882–83	—	—								—	QF	—	—	DNE	—	—	—
1883–84	—	—								—	R2	—	—	F (Note: Beaten 8–0 in Glasgow Merchants' Charity Cup final replay by Queen's Park at Titwood Park after original tie ended 1–1.)	—	—	—
1884–85	—	—								—	R3	—	—	DNE	—	—	—
1885–86	—	—								—	SF	—	—	DNE	R2 (Note: Third Lanark were due to play Church in the English FA Cup second round but scratched the tie.)	—	—
1886–87	—	—								—	R6	—	—	DNE	R2 (Note: Beaten 3–2 by Bolton Wanderers in the English FA Cup second round.)	—	—
1887–88	—	—								—	R1	—	R1	DNE	—	—	—
1888–89	—	—								—	W (Note: Third Lanark won their first Scottish Cup in 1889. Celtic were beaten 3–0 in the original tie, but due to the poor conditions and the unplayable nature of the pitch through snow, the match was ordered to be replayed the following week. Third Lanark claimed a 2–1 victory in the replayed tie.)	—	R3	R1	—	—	—
1889–90	—	—								—	SF	—	R3	W (Note: Beat Queen's Park 2–1 at Hampden Park in Glasgow Merchants' Charity Cup final.)	—	—	—
1890–91	1	SFL (Note: The Scottish Football League had only one division until the 1893–94 season)	18	8	3	7	38	39	15 (Note: Third Lanark were deducted four points for fielding ineligible players.)	5th	SF	—	F (Note: Reached first Glasgow Cup final but were beaten 4–0 by Celtic at Hampden Park.)	DNE	—	—	—
1891–92	1	SFL	22	8	5	9	44	47	21	=6th	R6	—	R1	DNE	—	—	—
1892–93	1	SFL	18	9	1	8	54	40	19	4th	QF	—	SF	R1	—	—	—
1893–94	1	Div 1 (Note: For the 1893–94 season a second tier of the Scottish Football League was formed by the inclusion of a number of clubs previously in the Scottish Football Alliance, with the leagues named Division One and Division Two.)	18	7	3	8	37	45	17	7th	SF	—	QF	R1	—	—	—
1894–95	1	Div 1	18	10	1	7	51	39	21	4th	R1	—	R2 (Note: Thirds beat Northern 5–0 in the first round but no record exists of any subsequent rounds played by the club in the 1894–95 season.)	R1	—	—	—
1895–96	1	Div 1	18	7	1	10	47	51	15	=6th	QF	—	R2	R1	3rd	—	—
1896–97	1	Div 1	18	5	1	12	29	46	11	8th	QF	—	R1	F (Note: Lost the Glasgow Merchants' Charity Cup final 6–1 to Rangers at Hampden Park.)	4th	—	—
1897–98	1	Div 1	18	8	2	8	37	38	18	=5th	SF	—	SF	W (Note: Won the Glasgow Merchants' Charity Cup after 1–0 win over Rangers at 'Old' Cathkin Park.)	5th	—	—
1898–99	1	Div 1	18	7	3	8	33	38	17	6th	R2	—	SF	R1	4th	—	—
1899–1900	1	Div 1	18	5	5	8	31	38	15	=6th	QF	—	R1	R1	2nd	—	—
1900–01	1	Div 1	20	6	6	8	20	29	18	=5th	QF	—	SF	W (Note: Beat Celtic 3–0 in Glasgow Merchants' Charity Cup final replay at Gilmorehill after original tie ended 0–0.)	1st (Note: Thirds won the six team Inter City Football League in the 1900–01 season by one point ahead of Hibernian.)	—	—
1901–02	1	Div 1	18	7	5	6	30	26	19	4th	R2	—	SF	SF	4th	William Maxwell	10 (Note: League goals only; top scorer in division.)
1902–03	1	Div 1	22	8	5	9	34	27	21	7th	QF	—	W (Note: Won first Glasgow Cup, beating Celtic 3–0 in the final at Ibrox Park.)	SF	3rd	—	—
1903–04	1	Div 1	26	20	3	3	61	26	43	1st	SF	—	W (Note: Retained Glasgow Cup by beating Celtic 1–0 in the final replay, after the first tie ended 1–1.)	SF	1st (Note: Won the five team 1903–04 Glasgow Football League tournament.)	—	—
1904–05	1	Div 1	26	14	7	5	60	28	35	3rd	W (Note: Thirds won their second and final Scottish Cup trophy in 1905, beating Rangers 3–1 in a replay after the original tie ended goalless.)	—	SF	SF	1st (Note: Won the six team 1904–05 Glasgow Football League tournament.)	—	—
1905–06	1	Div 1	30	16	2	12	62	39	34	6th	F (Note: Thirds fifth Scottish Cup final ended in a 1–0 defeat to Hearts at Ibrox Stadium.)	—	F (Note: Beaten 3–0 by Celtic in the Glasgow Cup final.)	SF	—	—	—
1906–07	1	Div 1	34	15	9	10	57	48	39	6th	R2	—	F (Note: Beaten 3–2 by Celtic in the Glasgow Cup final at Ibrox Park.)	SF	—	—	—
1907–08	1	Div 1	34	13	7	14	45	50	33	9th	R1	—	SF	R1	—	—	—
1908–09	1	Div 1	34	11	10	13	56	49	32	12th	QF	—	W (Note: Won the Glasgow Cup for a third time, beating Celtic 4–0 in a second replay after the first two final ties ended 1–1 and 2–2 respectively.)	SF	—	—	—
1909–10	1	Div 1	34	16	7	11	59	53	39	7th	R2	—	SF	F (Note: Lost the Glasgow Charity Merchants' Cup final on 8–3 corner count to Clyde after 1–1 draw at Hampden Park.)	—	—	—
1910–11	1	Div 1	34	16	7	11	59	53	39	8th	R5	—	SF	SF	—	—	—
1911–12	1	Div 1	34	12	7	15	40	57	31	11th	SF	—	SF	R1	—	—	—
1912–13	1	Div 1	34	8	12	14	31	41	28	15th	R2	—	R1	SF	—	—	—
1913–14	1	Div 1	38	13	10	15	42	51	36	8th	SF	—	F (Note: Beaten 3–0 in the Glasgow Cup final by Rangers.)	F (Note: Lost the Glasgow Merchants' Charity Cup final 6–0 to Celtic at Hampden Park.)	—	—	—
1914–15	1	Div 1	38	10	12	16	51	57	32	16th	— (Note: The Scottish Cup was not held in the 1914–15, 1915–16, 1916–17, 1917–18 or 1918–19 seasons due to the First World War, or the 1939–40, 1940–41, 1941–42, 1942–43, 1943–44, 1944–45 or 1945–46 seasons due to the Second World War.)	—	R1	SF	QF	—	—
1915–16	1	Div 1	38	9	11	18	38	56	29	17th	—	—	SF	R1	—	—	—
1916–17	1	Div 1	38	19	11	8	53	37	49	5th	—	—	SF	R1	—	—	—
1917–18	1	Div 1	34	10	7	17	56	62	27	13th	—	—	SF	SF	QR	—	—
1918–19	1	Div 1	34	11	9	14	60	60	31	12th	—	—	R1	R1	R2 (Note: Reached the second round of the 1919 Victory Cup.)	—	—
1919–20	1	Div 1	42	16	11	15	57	62	43	8th	QF	—	SF	R1	—	—	—
1920–21	1	Div 1	42	19	6	17	74	61	44	8th	R1	—	R1	R1	—	—	—
1921–22	1	Div 1	42	17	12	13	58	52	46	9th	R2	—	SF	SF	—	—	—
1922–23	1	Div 1	38	11	8	19	40	59	30	17th	SF	—	SF	SF	—	—	—
1923–24	1	Div 1	38	11	8	19	54	78	30	18th	R1	—	F (Note: Beaten 3–1 in the Glasgow Cup final by Rangers.)	R1	—	—	—
1924–25	1	Div 1	38	11	8	19	53	84	30	20th (↓)	R1	—	SF	R1	—	—	—
1925–26	2	Div 2	38	19	8	11	72	47	46	6th	QF	—	R1	SF	—	—	—
1926–27	2	Div 2	38	17	10	11	67	48	44	4th	R1	—	R1	R1	—	—	—
1927–28	2	Div 2	38	18	9	11	99	66	45	2nd (↑)	R2	—	SF	SF	—	—	—
1928–29	1	Div 1	38	10	6	22	71	102	26	19th (↓)	R2	—	SF	SF	—	—	—
1929–30	2	Div 2	38	23	6	9	92	53	52	4th	R1	—	R1	SF	—	—	—
1930–31	2	Div 2	38	27	7	4	107	42	61	1st (↑)	QF	—	R1	R1	—	—	—
1931–32	1	Div 1	38	21	4	13	92	81	46	4th	R1	—	R1	F (Note: Lost the Glasgow Merchants' Charity Cup final 6–1 to Rangers at Hampden Park.)	—	—	—
1932–33	1	Div 1	38	14	7	17	70	80	35	13th	R2	—	SF	R1	—	—	—
1933–34	1	Div 1	38	8	9	21	62	103	25	19th (↓)	R2	—	R1	SF	—	—	—
1934–35	2	Div 2	34	23	6	5	94	43	52	1st (↑)	R2	—	R1	R1	—	—	—
1935–36	1	Div 1	38	14	5	19	63	71	33	9th	F (Note: Thirds sixth and last Scottish Cup final in 1936 ended in a 1–0 defeat to Rangers at Hampden Park in front of a crowd of 88,859.)	—	SF	R1	—	—	—
1936–37	1	Div 1	38	20	6	12	79	61	46	6th	R2	—	R1	R1	—	—	—
1937–38	1	Div 1	38	11	13	14	68	73	35	9th	R1	—	F (Note: Beaten 2–1 in the Glasgow Cup final by Rangers.)	SF	—	—	—
1938–39	1	Div 1	38	12	8	18	80	96	32	15th	QF	—	R1	F (Note: Lost the Glasgow Merchants' Charity Cup on 7–4 corner count to Rangers after 0–0 draw at Hampden Park.)	—	—	—
1939–40	—	ELW (Note: The official Scottish Football League was suspended after five rounds of games due to the outbreak of the Second World War. Lanark were 9th in the table at the time. To replace the Football League, unofficial competitions were held, with Third Lanark being placed in the War Emergency League West Division for 1939–40.)	30	10	5	15	53	78	25	12th	—	—	SF	R1	R2	—	—
1940–41	—	South (Note: The unofficial wartime competitions were reorganised for the 1940–41 season, with a Southern Football League and Cup created. This format remained the same until 1945.)	30	9	7	14	56	80	25	13th	—	Grp^{4th}	R1	SF	R2	—	—
1941–42	—	South	30	14	2	14	79	90	30	8th	—	Grp^{4th}	R1	R1	R2	—	—
1942–43	—	South	30	8	4	18	58	83	20	13th	—	SF	F (Note: Beaten 5–2 by Rangers in the Glasgow Cup final.)	F (Note: Lost 3–0 to Celtic in Glasgow Merchants' Charity Cup final at Hampden Park.)	R1	—	—
1943–44	—	South	30	7	3	20	60	100	17	16th	—	Grp^{4th}	SF	R1	R1	—	—
1944–45	—	South	30	11	3	16	55	65	25	12th	—	Grp^{3rd}	SF	R1	R1	—	—
1945–46	—	A Div (Note: With the war at an end, a larger two tier structure was formed for the 1945–46 season, with Third Lanark placed in the A Division. The Scottish Football League officially resumed in 1946.)	30	14	2	14	63	68	30	9th	—	Grp^{3rd}	R1	SF	R2	—	—
1946–47	1	Div A	30	11	6	13	56	64	28	9th	R3	Grp^{4th}	F (Note: Lost 2–1 in the Glasgow Cup final to Clyde.)	SF	—	Bobby Mitchell	22
1947–48	1	Div A	30	10	6	14	56	73	26	11th	R2	Grp^{4th}	F (Note: Lost second successive Glasgow Cup final, being beaten 4–1 by Rangers.)	SF	—	—	—
1948–49	1	Div A	30	13	5	12	56	52	31	7th	R2	Grp^{3rd}	F (Note: Beaten in third successive Glasgow Cup final, this time losing 3–1 to Celtic in front of a competition record crowd of 87,000 at Hampden Park.)	SF	—	—	—
1949–50	1	Div A	30	11	3	16	44	62	25	12th	R2	Grp^{2nd}	SF	SF	—	—	—
1950–51	1	Div A	30	11	2	17	40	51	24	13th	R2	Grp^{2nd}	R1	SF	—	—	—
1951–52	1	Div A	30	9	8	13	51	62	26	12th	SF	Grp^{3rd}	SF	=W (Note: Played out a 2–2 draw with Clyde in the Glasgow Merchants' Charity Cup final at Hampden Park. Clyde and Third Lanark shared the trophy, each retaining it for six months.)	R1	—	—
1952–53	1	Div A	30	8	4	18	52	75	20	16th (↓)	SF	QF	SF	SF	—	—	—
1953–54	2	Div B	30	13	10	7	78	48	36	3rd	R3	QF	F (Note: Lost 3–0 in the Glasgow Cup final to Rangers.)	W (Note: Won the Glasgow Merchants' Charity Cup, beating Rangers 1–0 in the final at Hampden Park.)	—	—	—
1954–55	2	Div B	30	13	7	10	63	49	33	5th	R6	Grp^{2nd}	R1	R1	—	—	—
1955–56	2	Div 2	36	16	3	17	80	64	35	10th	R5	Grp^{3rd}	SF	W (Note: Won the Glasgow Merchants' Charity Cup, beating Partick Thistle 4–2 in the final at Hampden Park.)	—	—	—
1956–57	2	Div 2	36	24	3	9	105	51	51	2nd (↑)	R4	Grp^{4th}	SF	SF	—	—	—
1957–58	1	Div 1	34	13	4	17	69	88	30	14th	QF	QF	F (Note: Lost 4–2 in Glasgow Cup final replay to Rangers. The original tie ended 1–1.)	R1	—	—	—
1958–59	1	Div 1	34	11	10	13	74	83	32	11th	SF	Grp^{4th}	SF	R1	—	—	—
1959–60	1	Div 1	34	13	4	17	75	83	30	12th	R1	F (Note: Thirds last major cup final resulted in a 2–1 defeat to Hearts in the 1959 Scottish League Cup final at Hampden Park.)	R1	SF	—	—	—
1960–61	1	Div 1	34	20	2	12	100	80	42	3rd	R3	Grp^{3rd}	SF	SF	—	Alex Harley	42
1961–62	1	Div 1	34	13	5	16	59	60	31	11th	QF	Grp^{3rd}	F (Note: Beaten 3–2 in Glasgow Cup final replay by Celtic after 1–1 draw in original tie.)	— (Note: Between 1962 and 1966 (when the competition was discontinued) the Glasgow Merchants' Charity Cup was competed for by a Glasgow Select XI and an invited English club.)	RU (Note: France won the last edition of the Franco-Scottish trophy by winning the series, 2 aggregate victories to 1. Third Lanark lost their tie 6–1 on aggregate to Rouen.)	—	—
1962–63	1	Div 1	34	9	8	17	56	68	26	14th	R3	Grp^{4th}	W (Note: Won the Glasgow Cup for the fourth and final time, beating Celtic 2–1. This was to be Thirds last cup triumph.)	—	—	—	—
1963–64	1	Div 1	34	9	7	18	47	74	25	16th	R1	Grp^{3rd}	SF	—	Grp	—	—
1964–65	1	Div 1	34	3	1	30	22	99	7	18th (↓)	R2	Grp^{3rd}	SF	—	Grp	—	—
1965–66	2	Div 2	36	12	8	16	55	65	32	14th	R1	SR	n/a (Note: Glasgow Cup competition was not completed in 1965–66. Third Lanark won their first round tie before the competition stopped.)	—	—	—	—
1966–67	2	Div 2	38	13	8	17	67	78	34	11th	2P	Grp^{4th}	R1	—	—	—	—
1967–68	—	Club liquidated (✝) (Note: A winding up order was issued to Third Lanark on 7 June 1967 and the club's membership of the Scottish Football League ceased on 26 June 1967, with all remaining players made available for transfer.)								—	—						

=== Key ===
Key to divisions

SFL	Scottish Football League
Div 1	Scottish Football League Division One
Div 2	Scottish Football League Division Two
Div A	Scottish Football League Division A
Div B	Scottish Football League Division B
ELW	War Emergency League West Division
South	War Southern Football League
A Div	War A Division

Key to league position
colour codes and symbols

1st	League champions (top tier only)
2nd	League runners-up (top tier only)
3rd	League third place (top tier only)
(↑)	Promoted as champions
(↑)	Promoted
(↓)	Relegated

Key to cup colour codes
and rounds

W	Winners
F	Finalists / runners-up
SF	Semi-finals
QF	Quarter-finals
R1	First round, etc.
SR	Supplementary round
1P	First preliminary round, etc.
Grp	Group stage
^{4th}	Position in group stage

=== League performance summary ===
The Scottish Football League was founded in 1890 and, other than during seven years of hiatus during the Second World War, the national top division has been played every season since.

Over the course of 77 completed league seasons, Third Lanark competed in 58 seasons of the Scottish Football League Division One (1890–1925, 1928–29, 1931–34, 1935–39, 1946–53 and 1957–65), 12 seasons of the Scottish Football League Division Two (1925–28, 1929–31, 1934–35, 1953–57 and 1965–67) and seven seasons of wartime competition (1939–46).

The following is a summary of Third Lanark's total league performance statistics until their liquidation in 1967:

	∆	Sea	P	W	D	L	F	A	Pts	High	Low	Ave	P↑	R↓
Division One	1	58 (Note: Division One totals include all top tier seasons from 1890–1939 and since 1946. The incomplete 1939–40 edition has not been counted in the totals.)	1,810	667	358	785	3,093	3,407	1,673	1st	20th	10th	—	5
Division Two	2	12 (Note: Division Two totals include all second tier seasons from 1893–1915, 1921–1939 and since 1946.)	430	218	85	127	979	654	521	1st	14th	5th	4	—
War Leagues	—	7 (Note: War league totals include all seasons from 1939–40 to 1945–46, when the Scottish Football League was suspended for the Second World War.)	210	76	26	111	424	564	172	8th	16th	12th	—	—
Total	—	77	2,450	961	469	1,023	4,496	4,625	2,366	—	—	—	4	5

== Sources ==
- Soccerbase
- FitbaStats
- Football Club History Database
