= 1922–23 Dundee Hibernian F.C. season =

Dundee United
1922–23 season
- Manager: Jimmy Brownlie
- Stadium: Tannadice Park
- Scottish Football Alliance: ?th ?
- Eastern Football League: 8th W1 D1 L3 F4 A8 P3
- Scottish Cup: Round 2

The 1922–23 season was the 14th year of football played by Dundee Hibernian, and covers the period from 1 July 1922 to 30 June 1923. It was the last full season in which the team played under its original name.

== Match results ==
Dundee Hibernian played a total of 33 matches during the 1922–23 season.

=== Legend ===
Win
Draw
Loss

All results are written with Dundee Hibernian's score first. Own goals in italics

=== Scottish Football Alliance ===
Date	Opponent	Venue	Result	Attendance	Scorers
19 August 1922	Partick Thistle "A"	A	2-2		
26 August 1922	St Mirren "A"	H	0-2	2,000	
2 September 1922	St Mirren "A"	A	1-2		
9 September 1923	Heart of Midlothian "A"	H	0-2	2,000	
16 September 1922	Aberdeen "A"	A	2-2		
23 September 1922	Queen's Park Strollers	A	1-2		
30 September 1922	Rangers "A"	H	1-1		
2 October 1922	Aberdeen "A"	H	0-1		
14 October 1922	Raith Rovers "A"	H	1-0		
21 October 1922	Ayr United "A"	A	0-1		
28 October 1922	Airdrieonians "A"	H	1-1		
11 November 1922	Albion Rovers "A"	H	4-0		
25 November 1922	Kilmarnock "A"	H	1-0		
2 December 1922	Raith Rovers "A"	A	0-0		
9 December 1922	Kilmarnock "A"	A	1-2		
23 December 1922	Dundee "A"	A	1-6		
6 January 1923	Dundee "A"	H	0-3		
3 February 1923	Partick Thistle "A"	H	1-1		
10 February 1923	Albion Rovers "A"	A	0-1		
17 February 1923	Ayr United "A"	H	1-0		
24 February 1923	Third Lanark "A"	H	3-1		
3 March 1923	Heart of Midlothian "A"	A	0-5		
24 March 1923	Third Lanark "A"	A	2-2		
31 March 1923	Rangers"A"	A	2-3		
7 April 1923	Airdrieonians "A"	A	0-7		
28 April 1923	Queen's Park Strollers	H	0-0		

=== Eastern League ===
Date	Opponent	Venue	Result	Attendance	Scorers
18 November 1922	Leith Athletic	A	3-1		
16 December 1922	Montrose	A	0-2		
20 January 1923	Clackmannan	A	0-2		
9 April 1923	Aberdeen "A"	H	1-2		
21 April 1923	Dundee "A"	A	1-1		

=== Scottish Cup ===
Date	Rd	Opponent	Venue	Result	Attendance	Scorers
13 January 1923	R1	Beith	H	3-1	3,000	
27 January 1923	R2	Nithsdale Wanderers	H	0-1	2,000	
