= William McIntosh (disambiguation) =

William McIntosh (1775–1825) was a Creek Nation chief.

William McIntosh may also refer to:

- William McIntosh (footballer), Scottish international footballer
- Will McIntosh, American science fiction writer
- Willie McIntosh (actor), Thai actor
- Willie McIntosh (curler), Scottish curler
- William M'Intosh (1838–1931), Scottish physician and marine zoologist
- William McIntosh (fur trader) (died 1832), fur trader and treasurer of the Indiana Territory
- William McIntosh (politician), soldier and politician from Massachusetts

== See also ==
- William Priestly MacIntosh (1857–1930), Australian sculptor
- William Mackintosh (disambiguation)
