= Glasgow Perthshire F.C. =

Association football club in Glasgow City, Scotland

Glasgow Perthshire
- Full name: Glasgow Perthshire Football Club
- Nickname: The Shire
- Founded: 1890
- Ground: Keppoch Park, Glasgow
- Coordinates: 55°53′8″N 4°14′53″W
- Head Coach: Billy Adams
- League: West of Scotland League Third Division
- 2025–26: West of Scotland League Third Division, 16th of 16
- Website: glasgowperthshirefc.com
Home colours

Glasgow Perthshire Football Club is a Scottish football club based in Possilpark, in the north of Glasgow.

== History ==
The Glasgow Perthshire Athletic Club, within which the football club operated, was formed on 7 November 1890 at the Waterloo Rooms in Glasgow, by members of the Glasgow Perthshire Society.

=== Senior football ===
The club joined the Scottish Football Association in August 1892, and entered the preliminary rounds for the 1892–93 Scottish Cup. It was drawn at home to Wishaw Thistle in its first tie. The club got off to a bad start, Milligan heading through his own goal, although when 3–0 down Lamb pulled a goal back with a cross-shot. However, by half-time, the visitors were 6–2 up, and the Shire collapsed in the second half, the club going down 17–2.

Two weeks later the club lost 9–0 at Cambuslang in the Glasgow Cup; again fitness seemed to be an issue, the score only being 2–0 at half-time and 4–0 with less than half-an-hour to go.

=== Junior football ===
The Shire therefore returned to Junior status, and won the Scottish Junior Cup three times. The club's first success came in 1931–32, in its fortieth season of entry, goals from McVicar and Corrance giving the club a 2–1 win over Kirkintilloch Rob Roy.

The club's other two successes both came during the Second World War. Its win in the 1940–41 final was an epic affair, coming iafter three games against Armadale Thistle. The Shire was considered lucky to draw the first game, in front of 20,000 at Firhill, after both of its goals in a 2–2 draw were disputed (as was one of the Thistle's goals); the claims being made that Jack's opening goal was following up a shot from an offside Davidson, and Phillips' header to make it 2–1 was clawed from behind, rather than in front of, the line by Johnson in the Thistle goal. The replay, also at Firhill, ended goalless, McKinlay missing a penalty for Thistle after a "soft" handball; the second replay, at Tynecastle Park, went the Shire's way, 3–1, Gibson at centre-half receiving particular praise.

The club's final triumph, in 1943–44, was helped by opponents Blantyre Victoria losing inside-left Duffy to injury for most of the match, Graham scoring the only goal of the game with a "clipper" shot.

It pulled out of all competitive fixtures for the 2007–08 season, but re-entered for the 2008–09 season.

It currently competes in the West of Scotland League Third Division

== Colours ==
The club's black and white stripes date back at least to 1893.

== Ground ==
The club originally played at Kelburn Park. It moved to Keppoch Park in July 1932. The ground is close to Saracen Park, and also the home of Ashfield.

== Notable former players ==
The following ex-Perthshire players were capped for Scotland.

- Bobby Campbell - Chelsea
- Jimmy Connor - Sunderland
- Jimmy Lawrence - Newcastle United
- Tom Sloan - Third Lanark
- James Stark - Rangers
- Robert Thomson - Celtic

== Honours ==
Scottish Junior Cup

- Winners: 1931–32, 1940–41, 1943–44

=== Other Honours ===
- West of Scotland Cup winners: 1939–40
- Central League B Division winners / overall champions: 1976–77
- Central League A Division runners-up: 1979–80
- Central Division One winners: 1984–85, 2011–12
- West Central Second Division winners: 2001–02, 2016–17
- Glasgow Junior Cup: 1913–14
