= Alan Mackay (footballer) =

Scottish footballer and coach

Personal information
- Full name: Alan Mackay
- Date of birth: 1 November 1943 (age 82)
- Place of birth: Glasgow, Scotland
- Height: 6 ft 2 in (1.88 m)
- Positions: Left half; left back

Youth career
- Third Lanark
- Glasgow United

Senior career*
Years	Team	Apps	(Gls)
- Strathclyde
1963–1967	Third Lanark	71	(2)
1967–1969	Motherwell	39	(0)
1969–1974	Dumbarton	106	(1)
- * Club domestic league appearances and goals

Alan Mackay (born 11 January 1943) is a Scottish former football player and coach. He played for Third Lanark, Motherwell and Dumbarton in the Scottish Football League. After retiring, he worked as a coach with Dumbarton for five years.

== Playing career ==
Mackay was born in Glasgow; he started his senior career with Third Lanark in 1963, moving from local junior team Strathclyde alongside Tony Connell. The Cathkin Park club were relegated to Scottish Division Two in his second season. He played 71 times for Thirds, scoring twice before moving to Motherwell after the club went bust in 1967. He stayed at Fir Park for two years, making 39 appearances, and had a role in the squad that won the Division Two title in his second season, although by its end he had left the club.

After being released by Motherwell, Mackay moved to Dumbarton where he played until retiring in 1974. He played 106 times there, scoring twice and winning Division Two in his third season with the club. While at Dumbarton he played with many notable players such as Murdo MacLeod, John Cushley, Willie Wallace and Ian Wallace

== Coaching career ==
He was a coach at Dumbarton for five years after retiring, working as reserve and youth coach as well as scouting the opposition for manager Alex Wright, who described his work as "invaluable" to the club in their attempts to challenge the Old Firm.

== Personal life ==
Mackay worked in insurance and as a salesman during his playing career. After retiring, he worked as an insurance broker before founding his own company.
