= John Neilson (footballer, born 1874) =

Scottish footballer

Personal information
- Date of birth: 26 December 1874
- Place of birth: Renfrew, Scotland
- Position: Left half

Senior career*
Years	Team	Apps	(Gls)
- Renfrew Victoria
1896–1897	Abercorn	1	(0)
1897	Celtic	1	(0)
1897–1899	Abercorn	15	(5)
1899–1900	Third Lanark	15	(0)
1900–1902	Bristol Rovers	49	(6)
1902–1908	Third Lanark	101	(16)
1907–1908	→ Wishaw Thistle (loan)		
1908–1909	Albion Rovers	15	(5)
Total		197	(32)

International career
1900	Scottish League XI	1	(1)
- * Club domestic league appearances and goals

John Neilson (born 26 December 1874) was a Scottish footballer who played for Abercorn, Celtic, Third Lanark, Bristol Rovers and Albion Rovers, mainly as a left half.

He won the Scottish Football League championship with Third Lanark in 1903–04 and played in two consecutive Scottish Cup finals – a win over Rangers in 1905 via a replay and a loss to Heart of Midlothian in 1906. He also won two Glasgow Cup medals, the second of which (from the 1903–04 season) was sold at auction in 2011.

Neilson was selected once for the Scottish Football League XI in 1900, scoring in a 6–0 victory over the Irish League XI.
