= William Mackintosh =

William Mackintosh, MacIntosh, McIntosh or M'Intosh may refer to:

- Captain William Mackintosh, Irish-born British Army officer and Canadian engineer
- W. A. Mackintosh William Archibald Mackintosh, (1895–1970), Canadian academic
- William Mackintosh, Lord Kyllachy (1842–1918), Scottish advocate
- Mackintosh of Borlum (1658–1743), Scottish soldier
- William M'Intosh (1838–1931), also spelt McIntosh, Scottish physician and marine zoologist
- William MacKintosh (fur trader) (1784-1842), worked for the Hudson's Bay Company, in Rupertland

== See also ==
- William McIntosh (disambiguation)
