= 1929–30 Dundee United F.C. season =

Dundee United
1929–30 season
- Manager: Jimmy Brownlie
- Stadium: Tannadice Park
- Scottish Football League First Division: 19th W7 D8 L23 F56 A109 P22
- Scottish Cup: Round 2

The 1929–30 Dundee United F.C. season was the 25th edition of Dundee United F.C. annual football play in Scottish Football League First Division from 1 July 1929 to 30 June 1930.

== Match results ==
Dundee United played a total of 40 matches during the 1929–30 season, ranked 19th.

=== Legend ===
Win
Draw
Loss

All results are written with Dundee United's score first. Own goals in italics

=== First Division ===
Date	Opponent	Venue	Result	Attendance	Scorers
10 August 1929	Clyde	H	3–3	10,000	
17 August 1929	Hamilton Academical	A	2–5	3,000	
24 August 1929	Morton	H	3–1	1,000	
31 August 1929	Dundee	A	0–1	16,000	
7 September 1929	Airdrieonians	H	0–3	12,000	
14 September 1929	Heart of Midlothian	A	2–4	19,500	
21 September 1929	Queen's Park	H	2–1	8,000	
28 September 1929	Rangers	A	1–3	15,000	
5 October 1929	St Mirren	A	1–6	6,000	
19 October 1929	Ayr United	A	1–6	5,000	
23 October 1929	Celtic	H	2–2	6,000	
26 October 1929	Cowdenbeath	H	2–1	7,000	
2 November 1929	Motherwell	A	1–6	3,000	
9 November 1929	Partick Thistle	H	3–2	4,000	
16 November 1929	Kilmarnock	A	2–0	5,000	
23 November 1929	Aberdeen	H	2–4	12,000	
30 November 1929	St Johnstone	H	1–1	23,517	
7 December 1929	Falkirk	H	2–2	6,000	
14 December 1929	Hibernian	A	0–3	6,000	
21 December 1929	Clyde	A	2–3	5,000	
28 December 1929	Hamilton Academical	H	1–2	7,000	
1 January 1930	Cowdenbeath	A	1–4	4,000	
2 January 1930	Ayr United	H	1–2	4,000	
4 January 1930	Morton	A	1–6	10,000	
11 January 1930	Dundee	H	0–1	16,000	
25 January 1930	Airdrieonians	A	3–4	2,000	
11 February 1930	Queen's Park	A	0–1	4,000	
19 February 1930	Rangers	H	0–1	8,000	
22 February 1930	St Mirren	H	0–2	5,000	
1 March 1930	Celtic	A	0–7	7,000	
8 March 1930	Motherwell	H	1–1	3,000	
15 March 1930	Partick Thistle	A	1–1	6,000	
22 March 1930	Kilmarnock	H	6–4	5,000	
29 March 1930	Aberdeen	A	2–2	12,000	
2 April 1930	Heart of Midlothian	H	2–3	4,000	
5 April 1930	St Johnstone	A	1–6	2,000	
12 April 1930	Falkirk	A	5–2	2,000	
19 April 1930	Hibernian	H	2–2	1,000	

=== Scottish Cup ===
Date	Rd	Opponent	Venue	Result	Attendance	Scorers
18 January 1930	R1	Stranraer	A	2–0	2,500	
1 February 1930	R2	Partick Thistle	H	0–3	8,573	
