= George McCallum =

George McCallum may refer to:

- George McCallum (footballer) (1935–2022), Scottish association footballer
- George McCallum (sprinter) (born 1963), Scottish athletics competitor
