= James Johnston (1900s footballer) =

Scottish footballer

Personal information
- Position: Outside right

Senior career*
Years	Team	Apps	(Gls)
1901–1907	Third Lanark	119	(47)
1907–1908	Swindon Town	34	(4)
1908–1910	Third Lanark	47	(12)
Total		200	(63)

International career
1903	Scottish League XI	1	(0)
- * Club domestic league appearances and goals

James Johnston (Note: The surname is spelled Johnstone in some sources, and a lack of other personal information makes it difficult to clarify the correct name.) was a Scottish footballer who played as an outside right, mainly for Third Lanark.

He won the Scottish Football League championship with the Glasgow club in 1903–04 and played in two consecutive Scottish Cup finals, scoring in the first – a win over Rangers in 1905 via a replay – but losing to Heart of Midlothian in 1906. He also played in England with Swindon Town (then competing in the Southern Football League) for a season, finding the winning goal in an FA Cup 'giant killing' of Sheffield United, before returning to Third Lanark for two more years, collecting a Glasgow Cup medal to add to two others won in his first spell.

Johnston was selected once for the Scottish Football League XI in 1903, and played twice in the Glasgow Football Association's annual challenge match against Sheffield.
