= Tom Sloan (footballer, born 1880) =

Scottish footballer

Personal information
- Full name: Thomas Parker Sloan
- Date of birth: 4 October 1880
- Place of birth: Glasgow, Scotland
- Position: Centre half

Senior career*
Years	Team	Apps	(Gls)
- Thornliebank
1899–1900	Glasgow Perthshire		
1900–1914	Third Lanark	233	(11)

International career
1904	Scotland	1	(0)
- * Club domestic league appearances and goals

Thomas Parker Sloan (born 4 October 1880) was a Scottish footballer who played as a centre half.

== Career ==
Born in Glasgow, Sloan played club football for Third Lanark, where he served as club captain and won the Scottish Football League championship with them in 1904, followed by the Scottish Cup in 1905. He later served as a club director.

Sloan made one appearance for Scotland in 1904.
