= 1873–74 3rd Lanark RV season =

3rd Lanark RV
1873–74 season
- Stadium: Cathkin Park
- Scottish Cup: Quarter-finals
Home colours

The 1873–74 season was the first season of competitive football by 3rd Lanark RV.

== Overview ==
As one of the eight founder members of the Scottish FA, 3rd Lanark RV took part in the inaugural Scottish Cup. Subscription fees from 15 of the 16 clubs that entered the competition were used to pay for the trophy for which they compete.

The team reached the quarter-finals without playing a match after first round opponents Southern withdrew. However, 3rd Lanark RV were defeated by eventual finalists Clydesdale after a second replay.

During the club's early years, the team would play in red shirts and blue shorts. Their traditional white shorts weren't introduced until 1876.

== Results ==
=== Scottish Cup ===
Date	Round	Opponents	H / A	Result F–A	Scorers	Attendance
October 1873	First round	Southern	Walkover			
8 November 1873	Quarter-final	Clydesdale	A	1–1		
15 November 1873	Quarter-final replay	Clydesdale	H	0–0		
6 December 1873	Quarter-final second replay	Clydesdale	N	0–2		

=== Friendlies ===
Date	Opponents	H / A	Result F–A	Scorers	Attendance
17 January 1874	Western	H	1–1		
