= 1926–27 Dundee United F.C. season =

Dundee United
1926–27 season
- Manager: Jimmy Brownlie
- Stadium: Tannadice Park
- Scottish Football League First Division: 20th W7 D8 L23 F56 A101 P22
- Scottish Cup: Round 4

The 1926–27 Dundee United F.C. season was the 22nd edition of Dundee United F.C. annual football play in Scottish Football League First Division from 1 July 1926 to 30 June 1927.

== Match results ==
Dundee United played a total of 43 matches during the 1926–27 season. ranked 20th.

=== Legend ===
Win
Draw
Loss

All results are written with Dundee United's score first. Own goals in italics

=== First Division ===
| Date | Opponent | Venue | Result | Attendance | Scorers |
|---|---|---|---|---|---|
| 14 August 1926 | Rangers | A | 0–2 | 20,000 | |
| 21 August 1926 | Hibernian | H | 0–2 | 9,000 | |
| 28 August 1926 | Dundee | A | 0–5 | 20,000 | |
| 4 September 1926 | Kilmarnock | H | 1–2 | 10,000 | |
| 11 September 1926 | Cowdenbeath | A | 1–4 | 4,000 | |
| 18 September 1926 | Clyde | H | 3–1 | 6,000 | |
| 25 September 1926 | Falkirk | A | 3–5 | 6,000 | |
| 2 October 1926 | Queen's Park | H | 2–2 | 10,000 | |
| 9 October 1926 | Hamilton Academical | A | 1–1 | 2,000 | |
| 16 October 1926 | Dunfermline Athletic | A | 0–2 | 8,000 | |
| 23 October 1926 | Airdrieonians | H | 2–4 | 8,000 | |
| 30 October 1926 | Greenock Morton | H | 0–0 | 5,000 | |
| 6 November 1926 | St Johnstone | A | 1–4 | 6,000 | |
| 13 November 1926 | Aberdeen | H | 2–2 | 7,000 | |
| 20 November 1926 | Motherwell | H | 0–1 | 8,000 | |
| 27 November 1926 | Celtic | A | 2–7 | 4,000 | |
| 4 December 1926 | Heart of Midlothian | H | 5–3 | 8,000 | |
| 11 December 1926 | Partick Thistle | A | 2–2 | 8,000 | |
| 18 December 1926 | St Mirren | H | 2–1 | 6,000 | |
| 25 December 1926 | Rangers | H | 2–0 | 15,000 | |
| 1 January 1927 | Greenock Morton | A | 1–3 | 5,000 | |
| 3 January 1927 | Dundee | H | 1–0 | 20,000 | |
| 8 January 1927 | Kilmarnock | A | 0–3 | 4,000 | |
| 15 January 1927 | Cowdenbeath | H | 0–2 | 10,000 | |
| 29 January 1927 | Clyde | A | 0–1 | 3,000 | |
| 9 February 1927 | Falkirk | H | 0–2 | 5,000 | |
| 12 February 1927 | Queen's Park | A | 3–5 | 12,000 | |
| 26 February 1927 | Dunfermline Athletic | H | 4–4 | 8,000 | |
| 2 March 1927 | Hamilton Academical | H | 1–2 | 3,000 | |
| 9 March 1927 | Airdrieonians | A | 2–7 | 3,000 | |
| 12 March 1927 | Hibernian | A | 2–3 | 12,000 | |
| 19 March 1927 | St Johnstone | H | 1–2 | 6,000 | |
| 26 March 1927 | Aberdeen | A | 2–2 | 9,500 | |
| 2 April 1927 | Motherwell | A | 0–6 | 3,000 | |
| 9 April 1927 | Celtic | H | 3–3 | 5,000 | |
| 16 April 1927 | Heart of Midlothian | A | 2–1 | 9,500 | |
| 23 April 1927 | Partick Thistle | H | 2–1 | 2,500 | |
| 30 April 1927 | St Mirren | A | 3–4 | 3,000 | |

=== Scottish Cup ===
| Date | Rd | Opponent | Venue | Result | Attendance | Scorers |
|---|---|---|---|---|---|---|
| 19 January 1927 | R1 | Arbroath Athletic | A | 7–0 | 2,500 | |
| 5 February 1927 | R2 | Vale of Leven | H | 4–1 | 6,300 | |
| 23 February 1927 | R3 | Montrose | H | 2–2 | 5,000 | |
| 24 February 1927 | R3 R | Montrose | A | 3–1 | 3,000 | |
| 5 March 1927 | R4 | Partick Thistle | A | 0–5 | 25,000 | |
