= Thomas McKenzie (footballer) =

Scottish footballer (c.1884–??)

Personal information
- Full name: Thomas McKenzie
- Date of birth: c. 1884
- Place of birth: Glasgow, Scotland
- Position: Centre forward

Senior career*
Years	Team	Apps	(Gls)
1902–1903	Petershill		
1903–1905	Third Lanark	50	(29)
1905–1906	Sunderland	8	(1)
1906–1907	Plymouth Argyle	26	(10)
1907	Portsmouth		
1907–1908	Glossop	6	(1)
1908–1909	Queens Park Rangers	9	(1)
- Dunfermline Athletic
- * Club domestic league appearances and goals

Thomas McKenzie was a Scottish professional footballer who played as a centre forward in the Scottish League, Southern League and Football League in the early 20th century.

== Career ==
A centre forward, McKenzie began his professional career with Scottish League First Division club Third Lanark. He was a member of the squads which won the league championship in 1903–04 and the Scottish Cup in 1904–05 and he scored 33 goals in 60 appearances for the club. McKenzie subsequently became a journeyman in English football and played in the Southern and Football Leagues for Sunderland, Plymouth Argyle, Portsmouth, Glossop and Queens Park Rangers.

== Career statistics ==
Appearances and goals by club, season and competition
Club	Season	League			National Cup		Other		Total	
Club	Season	Division	Apps	Goals	Apps	Goals	Apps	Goals	Apps	Goals
Third Lanark	1903–04	Scottish Division One	21	11	2	1	1 (Note: Appearance in Glasgow Cup)	0	24	12
Third Lanark	1904–05	Scottish Division One	23	14	5	2	1	0	29	16
Third Lanark	1905–06	Scottish Division One	6	4	0	0	1	1	7	5
Third Lanark	Total		50	29	7	3	3	1	60	33
Sunderland	1905–06	First Division	8	1	0	0	—		8	1
Plymouth Argyle	1906–07	Southern League First Division	26	10	1	0	—		27	10
Queens Park Rangers	1908–09	Southern League First Division	9	1	0	0	—		9	1
Career total			93	41	8	3	3	1	103	45

== Honours ==
Third Lanark

- Scottish Division One: 1903–04
- Scottish Cup: 1904–05
