= Southern F.C. =

Southern F.C. may refer to:

- Southern F.C. (Glasgow)
- Southern F.C. (Greenock)
- Southern District F.C., football club from Hong Kong
- Southern FC, football club from Australia
