= Robert Barr (footballer) =

Scottish footballer

Personal information
- Place of birth: Scotland
- Position: Right back

Youth career
- Kelburne
- Park Royal

Senior career*
Years	Team	Apps	(Gls)
- Black Watch
1896–1910	Third Lanark	239	(1)
1910–1911	Abercorn	6	(0)
- * Club domestic league appearances and goals

Robert Barr was a Scottish footballer who played as a right back, mainly for Third Lanark, making over 300 appearances for the Glasgow club in all competitions over 13 years.

== Career ==
Having joined the Warriors from a spell in the Army where he had risen to the rank of captain in the Black Watch, Barr won the Scottish Football League championship in 1903–04, playing in 24 of the 26 fixtures, and played in two consecutive Scottish Cup finals – a win over Rangers in 1905 via a replay and a loss to Heart of Midlothian in 1906.

In the first few years of his career between 1897 and 1901, he also won the Glasgow Merchants Charity Cup twice and was a beaten finalist on a further occasion, then claimed two winner's medals in the Glasgow Cup medals and was a runner-up twice in the space of five years between 1902 and 1907. A benefit match against Queen's Park was played in 1906.

Despite his success at club level, Barr's sole representative appearance was for the Glasgow FA in their annual challenge match against Sheffield in October 1906. He had stiff competition for international recognition in his position from the likes of Nicol Smith, Tom Jackson, Donald McLeod and Andrew McCombie.
