= Andrew Thomson (Scottish footballer) =

Scottish footballer

Personal information
- Full name: Andrew Thomson
- Date of birth: 27 August 1865
- Place of birth: Barrhead, Scotland
- Date of death: 2 June 1936 (aged 70)
- Place of death: Prestwick, Scotland
- Position: Full-back

Senior career*
Years	Team	Apps	(Gls)
- Levern F.C.
1882–1888	Arthurlie		
1888–1894	Third Lanark	45	(2)

International career
1886–1889	Scotland	2	(0)
1893	Scottish League XI	1	(0)
- * Club domestic league appearances and goals

Andrew Thomson (27 August 1865 – 2 June 1936) was a Scottish footballer who played as a full-back. He earned two caps for Scotland in 1886 and 1889.

== Club career ==
During his career, Thomson played for Levern, Arthurlie and Third Lanark. He won the Scottish Cup with Third Lanark in 1889.

== International career ==
Thomson made his first appearance for Scotland on 20 March 1886, in a 7–2 away win against Ireland. He earned his second and final cap three years later, serving as team captain in a scoreless draw in Wrexham against Wales on 15 April 1889. In some sources, Thomson was mistakenly listed as two different players. He was also selected to play for the Scottish Football League XI and for Renfrewshire and Glasgow in challenge matches.

== Personal life ==
Thomson was born in Grahamston, Barrhead. Later in his life he moved to Pollokshields, where his gold medals were stolen from his home, before retiring to Prestwick, where he died on 2 June 1936 at the age of 70.

== See also ==
- List of Scotland national football team captains
