= John Marshall (Third Lanark footballer) =

Scottish footballer

John Marshall was a Scottish footballer who played for Wellpark, Harmonic, Third Lanark and Scotland, mainly as an outside forward. Marshall played four times for Scotland between 1885 and 1887 and scored one goal on his debut in an 8–2 win against Ireland in March 1885. He was also selected for several of the Glasgow Football Association's challenge matches against other British city selections (a regular occurrence in the era), and at club level was a Scottish Cup winner with Third Lanark in 1889. He later became a football referee.
