= Jimmy Oswald =

Scottish footballer

- Oswald in Scotland kit, 1895

Personal information
- Full name: James Oswald
- Date of birth: 3 January 1868
- Place of birth: Greenock, Scotland
- Date of death: 26 February 1948 (aged 80)
- Place of death: Glasgow, Scotland
- Position: Forward

Senior career*
Years	Team	Apps	(Gls)
- Clyde Bank
- Govan
- Kilbirnie
- Third Lanark
1889–1893	Notts County	95	(55)
1893	→ Third Lanark (loan)	1	(0)
1893–1895	St Bernard's	32	(18)
1895–1899	Rangers	26	(13)
1899–1903	Morton	41	(23)

International career
1889–1897	Scotland	3	(1)
1894–1896	Scottish Football League XI	3	(3)
- * Club domestic league appearances and goals

James Oswald (3 January 1868 – 26 February 1948) was a Scottish footballer who played as a centre forward. He took part in the 1891 FA Cup Final for Notts County (scoring their goal in a 3–1 defeat to Blackburn Rovers). During his career he also played in Scotland for Third Lanark and St Bernard's, winning the Scottish Cup with both clubs either side of his spell in England, in 1889 and 1895. He also spent four years with Rangers (1895 to 1899), during which time they claimed two Scottish Cups and a Scottish Football League title, but Oswald was a reserve and his involvement in these wins was minimal. He then finished his career at Morton.

Oswald made three appearances for Scotland (scoring once) between 1894 and 1896. He also represented the Scottish Football League XI three times.

His younger brother John Oswald was also a footballer; both siblings (who were born in Greenock but relocated to the Gorbals area of Glasgow with their family when very young), played together in the 1889 Scottish Cup Final, then moved to England to play for Notts County.

== See also ==
- List of Scotland national football team captains
- List of Scottish football families
