= Robert Downie (footballer) =

Scottish footballer

Personal information
- Date of birth: 19 March 1867
- Place of birth: Anderston, Scotland
- Date of death: 27 July 1893 (aged 26)
- Place of death: Dalmuir, Scotland
- Position: Goalkeeper

Senior career*
Years	Team	Apps	(Gls)
- Thornliebank
1888–1893	Third Lanark	48	(0)

International career
1892	Scotland	1	(0)
- * Club domestic league appearances and goals

Robert Downie (19 March 1867 in Glasgow – 27 July 1893) was a Scottish footballer who played for Thornliebank, Third Lanark and Scotland as a goalkeeper. He was a Scottish Cup winner in 1889.
