= 1959 Scottish League Cup final =

- Event: 1959–60 Scottish League Cup
Heart of Midlothian	Third Lanark
2	1
- Date: 24 October 1959
- Venue: Hampden Park, Glasgow
- Attendance: 57,994

The 1959 Scottish League Cup final was a football match played on 24 October 1959 at Hampden Park in Glasgow and was the final of the 14th Scottish League Cup competition. The final was contested by Hearts, who had won the previous year's final, and Third Lanark. Third Lanark led 1–0 at half time thanks to an early goal by Joe McInnes, but Hearts turned things around and won 2–1 to retain the cup thanks to second half goals by Johnny Hamilton and Alex Young. Hearts later completed a League and League Cup double – the only non Old Firm side to achieve such a double.

== Match details ==
24 October 1959

Heart of Midlothian	2–1	Third Lanark
Hamilton 57'; Young 59'	Report	McInnes 2'

Hampden Park, Glasgow
Attendance: 57,994
Referee: Tom Wharton

HEARTS:
GK	Gordon Marshall
FB	Bobby Kirk
FB	George Thomson
RH	Andy Bowman
CH	John Cumming (c)
LH	Billy Higgins
RW	Gordon Smith
IF	Ian Crawford
CF	Alex Young
IF	Bobby Blackwood
LW	Johnny Hamilton
Manager:
Tommy Walker

THIRD LANARK :
GK	Jocky Robertson
FB	Billy Lewis
FB	John Brown
RH	Jim Reilly
CH	George McCallum
LH	Willie Cunningham
RW	Joe McInnes
IF	Bobby Craig
CF	Dave Hilley (c)
IF	Matt Gray
LW	Ian Hilley
Manager:
George Young
