= Findlay McGillivray =

Scottish footballer

Personal information
- Full name: Findlay McGillivray
- Date of birth: 19 March 1940 (age 86)
- Place of birth: Newtongrange, Scotland
- Height: 5 ft 10 in (1.78 m)
- Position: Full back

Youth career
- Newtongrange Bluebell

Senior career*
Years	Team	Apps	(Gls)
1955–1959	Newtongrange Star		
1959–1964	Third Lanark	121	(2)
1964–1966	Rangers	0	(0)
1966–1967	Bradford (Park Avenue)	39	(0)
1967–1969	St Johnstone	44	(0)
1969–1970	Albion Rovers	1	(0)
1970–1972	Newtongrange Star		
Total		205	(2)

International career
1962	Scotland U23	1	(0)
- * Club domestic league appearances and goals

Findlay McGillivray (born 19 March 1940) is a Scottish former professional footballer who played as a full back.

== Career ==
Born in Newtongrange, Mcgillivray (sometimes known as 'Junior') played for Newtongrange Star, Third Lanark, Rangers, Bradford Park Avenue, St Johnstone and Albion Rovers.

In September 2012, McGillivray was made a Life Members of the Third Lanark Supporters Club.
