= Tony Connell =

Scottish footballer (1944–2024)

Personal information
- Full name: Anthony Connell
- Date of birth: 27 January 1944
- Place of birth: Glasgow, Scotland
- Date of death: 30 December 2024 (aged 80)
- Position: Full-back

Senior career*
Years	Team	Apps	(Gls)
- Strathclyde
1963–1967	Third Lanark	91	(1)
1967–1971	St Mirren	114	(1)
1971–1974	Queen of the South	59	(1)
1974–1976	Pollok		
- * Club domestic league appearances and goals

Anthony Connell (27 January 1944 – 30 December 2024) was a Scottish football player and coach. A full-back, he played for Third Lanark, St Mirren and Queen of the South in the Scottish Football League and also played Junior football with Pollok for his final two seasons, then coached them for one season after his retirement.

== Playing career ==
Connell was born in Govan; he started his senior career with Third Lanark in 1963, moving from local junior team Strathclyde alongside Alan Mackay. The Cathkin Park club were relegated to Scottish Division Two in his second season. He played 91 times for Thirds, scoring once before moving to St Mirren after Thirds went bust in 1967 (he had played in the club's final game against Dumbarton). Saints won promotion to Scottish Division One in his first season with the club as they won the league. He was named their Player of the Year in 1969–70, before leaving at the end of the next season. He made a total of 114 appearances scoring once. He joined Queen of the South in Division Two in 1971 and left in 1974, playing 59 games and scoring once. After this he played for Pollok for two seasons, then coached the junior club for a further season.

In 2007, he was inducted into the St Mirren hall of fame.

== Personal life and death ==
Connell was a part-time footballer and also worked for Glasgow Corporation Housing Department throughout his career. He died peacefully on 30 December 2024, at the age of 80.
