= John Oswald (footballer) =

Scottish footballer

Personal information
- Full name: John McGill Oswald
- Date of birth: 1869
- Place of birth: Greenock, Scotland
- Date of death: 1953
- Place of death: East Kilbride, Scotland
- Position: Inside right

Senior career*
| Years | Team | Apps | (Gls) |
- Third Lanark
| 1889–1890 | Notts County | 22 | (6) |
| 1890–1891 | Burnley | 15 | (1) |
- Sunderland Albion
| | Morton | 4 | (1) |
- * Club domestic league appearances and goals

John McGill Oswald (1869–1953) was a Scottish professional footballer who played as an inside right. He won the Scottish Cup with Third Lanark alongside his elder brother Jimmy Oswald in 1889, scoring in the victory over Celtic in the final. Both siblings (who were born in Greenock but relocated to the Gorbals area of Glasgow with their family when very young), then moved to England to play for Notts County.
