= 1874–75 3rd Lanark RV season =

3rd Lanark RV
1874–75 season
- Stadium: Cathkin Park
- Scottish Cup: Quarter-finals
Home colours

The 1874–75 season was the second season of competitive football by 3rd Lanark RV.

During the club's early years, the team would play in red shirts and blue shorts. Their traditional white shorts weren't introduced until 1876.

== Scottish Cup ==
3rd Lanark RV entered the Scottish Cup for the second time but were eliminated in the quarter-finals by Dumbarton

Date	Round	Opponents	H / A	Result F–A	Scorers	Attendance
17 October 1873	First round	Barrhead	H	0–0		
24 October 1873	First round replay	Barrhead	H	1–0		
21 November 1874	Second round	Standard	A	0–0		
28 November 1874	Second round replay	Standard	H	2–0		
26 December 1874	Quarter-final	Dumbarton	A	0–1		
