= William McIntosh (footballer) =

Scottish footballer

Personal information
- Full name: William Forbes McIntosh
- Date of birth: 2 January 1879
- Place of birth: Stirling, Scotland
- Date of death: 15 January 1973 (aged 94)
- Place of death: Edmonton, Canada
- Positions: Left back; left half

Senior career*
Years	Team	Apps	(Gls)
- King's Park
- East Stirlingshire
1901–1910	Third Lanark	179	(3)
1910–1911	Vale of Leven	6	(0)
1911–1912	Fulham	6	(0)

International career
1905	Scotland	1	(0)
- * Club domestic league appearances and goals

William Forbes McIntosh (2 January 1879 – 15 January 1973) was a Scottish footballer who played as a left back or left half.

He played club football for Third Lanark and Vale of Leven, and made one appearance for Scotland in 1905. With Third Lanark, McIntosh won the Scottish Football League title in 1903–04 and the Scottish Cup in 1905. He later emigrated to Canada.
