= Bob Johnstone (Scottish footballer) =

Scottish footballer

Personal information
- Full name: Robert Johnstone
- Place of birth: Renton, West Dunbartonshire, Scotland
- Height: 5 ft 7 in (1.70 m)
- Position: Outside left

Senior career*
Years	Team	Apps	(Gls)
1892–1895	Dumbarton	27	(17)
1895–1896	Renton	13	(5)
1896–1897	Sunderland	12	(1)
1897–1899	Third Lanark	25	(12)
1899–1???	Dunfermline Athletic		
- * Club domestic league appearances and goals

Robert Johnstone was a Scottish professional footballer who played as an outside left for Sunderland.
