= Jimmy Brownlie =

Scottish footballer and manager

Personal information
- Date of birth: 15 May 1885
- Place of birth: Blantyre, Scotland
- Date of death: 29 December 1973 (aged 88)
- Place of death: Dundee, Scotland
- Position: Goalkeeper

Senior career*
| Years | Team | Apps | (Gls) |
| 1902–1906 | Blantyre Victoria | | |
| 1906–1923 | Third Lanark | 481 | (2) |
| 1918–1919 | → Morton (loan) | 22 | (0) |
| 1923–1926 | Dundee United | 30 | (0) |
| Total | | 533 | (2) |

International career
| 1909–1919 | Scottish League XI | 14 | (0) |
| 1909–1914 | Scotland | 16 | (0) |
| 1917 | Scottish League (wartime) | 1 | (0) |
| 1919 | → Scotland (wartime) | 4 | (0) |

Managerial career
- 1923–1931: Dundee United
- 1934–1936: Dundee United
- 1938–1939: Dundee United
- * Club domestic league appearances and goals

James Brownlie (15 May 1885 – 29 December 1973) was a Scottish footballer and manager, who played as a goalkeeper.

== Career ==
Brownlie was born in Blantyre, Lanarkshire, and was an outstanding personality in Scottish football over many years, as a goalkeeper and manager. Almost his entire professional playing career, lasting from 1906 to 1923, was spent with Third Lanark, having joined them from local Junior team Blantyre Victoria to replace Jimmy Raeside who had moved to English football.

Brownlie continued to work in his chosen trade as a bricklayer while playing for Thirds and maintained a humble outlook despite being an important member of what was one of Scotland's leading clubs of the time (although their best spell, in which they won the Scottish Football League in 1904 and the Scottish Cup in 1905, then reached its final again the following year, narrowly preceded his arrival – his sole honour was a Glasgow Cup in 1908).

Brownlie scored a goal at least twice for Third Lanark, the first a rebound from a penalty kick he had taken against Motherwell in 1911 and the other during the 1914–15 season. (Note: It is claimed in some publications that a rule change in 1912 regarding goalkeepers being restricted to their area (prior to which they could roam and handle the ball anywhere in their own half) was prompted by both Brownlie and opposite number Colin Hampton scoring with long clearances in a 1910 fixture, again against Motherwell; however, newspaper reports from the relevant period do not indicate such an event took place. Other publications state both goalkeepers scored penalties, but although Motherwell did convert a penalty in the same match as Brownlie did, the report of the time indicated forward Thomas Gilchrist was their scorer.)

At international level, he played for Scotland in 16 of the last 17 internationals before the First World War, was also selected in four unofficial Victory Internationals once the conflict was over, and took part in a Scottish tour of North America in 1921 organised by Third Lanark. He played for the Scottish League XI 14 times.

In May 1923, Brownlie was appointed player-manager of Dundee Hibernian, who were renamed Dundee United later that year. He continued to play for a further season, but later made one further appearance in an emergency, at the age of 40 in 1926. His first managerial spell with the club found early success, with the Division Two title in 1925, and again in 1929, but he left the club in April 1931 on the brink of a third promotion.

He returned in 1934 with the club at a low ebb, one away from bottom of Division Two, and helped to effect a partial revival before he left again in October 1936. A third and final spell came in season 1938–39, in a dual role with Sam Irving; both men were also appointed as directors of the club at this time. In May 1939, Brownlie announced that he was giving up both roles due to the pressure of his other business interests.

After leaving his position at Dundee United, Brownlie continued to regularly attend the club's matches and saw the side finally return to Scotland's top division in 1960. In January 2019 it was announced that Brownlie was to be inducted into the Dundee United Hall of Fame at a dinner the following month.

== Honours ==
=== As a manager ===
Dundee United

- Scottish League Division Two: 1924–25, 1928–29

== See also ==
- List of footballers in Scotland by number of league appearances (500+)
- List of goalscoring goalkeepers
- List of Third Lanark A.C. players
