= Johnny Lynas =

Scottish footballer (1907–1988)

Personal information
- Date of birth: 18 January 1907
- Place of birth: Blantyre, Scotland
- Date of death: 1988 (aged 80–81)
- Height: 5 ft 4 in (1.63 m)
- Position: Outside right

Senior career*
| Years | Team | Apps | (Gls) |
| 1924–1925 | Linlithgow Port | | |
| 1925–1926 | Shettleston | | |
| 1926–1927 | Rutherglen Glencairn | | |
| 1927–1928 | Bo'ness | 27 | (4) |
| 1928–1929 | Sunderland | 10 | (1) |
| 1929–1935 | Third Lanark | 158 | (54) |
| 1935 | Raith Rovers | 4 | (0) |
| Total | | 199 | (59) |
- * Club domestic league appearances and goals

John Lynas (18 January 1907 – 1988) was a Scottish professional footballer who played as an outside right for Sunderland, Bo'ness and Third Lanark.
