= Jocky Robertson =

Scottish footballer (1926–2004)

Jocky Robertson (21 May 1926 – 2004) was a Scottish footballer who played as a goalkeeper for Armadale Thistle, Third Lanark and Berwick Rangers despite being of notably short height.

== Early life ==
Jocky Robertson was born in Edinburgh on 21 May 1926. He grew up on a council estate in the Prestonfield area of the city, and supported Heart of Midlothian. He sustained a serious injury to his hands while working in a cardboard box factory, but recovered sufficiently to resume playing as a goalkeeper.

== Playing career ==
Robertson played in junior football for Armadale Thistle and represented the Scotland Junior international team. He joined Third Lanark in 1951 and after making his senior debut against Airdrieonians on 2 December 1951 went on to be their first-choice goalkeeper for the next twelve years. He was part of the Third Lanark team that reached the 1959 Scottish League Cup Final, losing 2–1 against Heart of Midlothian, (Note: Playing against the team he had supported as a boy, Robertson wore a Hearts shirt underneath his goalkeeper's jersey in the final.) and then finished third in the Scottish Football League in the 1960–61 season, scoring 100 goals but conceding 80. The team thereafter went into decline as talented players were sold, and Robertson was also allowed to leave, making his final appearance against Dundee in May 1963. A mooted testimonial match failed to happen, and Robertson had a short spell with Berwick Rangers before retiring.

== Style of play ==
At a height of 5 feet 5 1/2 inches (1.664 m), Robertson was extremely short for a goalkeeper, but was able to command the penalty area due to his ability to judge when to jump for the ball and his reliability in catching. His technique of gathering the ball and going to ground in a single movement helped him cope against aggressive opponents in an era when goalkeepers could be physically challenged when in possession. He was confident facing cross balls, claiming that Charlie Church of Queen's Park was the only opponent to consistently cause him problems.

== Personal life and death ==
After leaving professional football, Robertson worked as an upholsterer. He was married and had three children, six grandchildren and eight great-grandchildren.

Robertson died in Edinburgh in 2004.
