= Jimmy Raeside =

Scottish footballer

Personal information
- Full name: James Smith Raeside
- Birth name: James Smith Reside
- Date of birth: 1879
- Place of birth: Camlachie, Scotland
- Date of death: 17 January 1946 (aged 66–67)
- Place of death: Glasgow, Scotland
- Position: Goalkeeper

Youth career
- 1896–1898: Wellington Stars

Senior career*
| Years | Team | Apps | (Gls) |
| 1898–1899 | Parkhead | | |
| 1899–1906 | Third Lanark | 143 | (0) |
| 1906–1912 | Bury | 156 | (3) |
| Total | | 299 | (3) |

International career
| 1906 | Scotland | 1 | (0) |
- * Club domestic league appearances and goals

James Smith Raeside (1879 – 17 January 1946) was a Scottish footballer who played as a goalkeeper.

== Career ==
Raeside was born in Glasgow, the son of William Raeside and Margaret Smith. He played club football for Parkhead, Third Lanark and Bury. He won the Scottish Football League with Third Lanark in 1903–04 (playing in all 26 fixtures) and the Scottish Cup in 1905. During his spell in England with Bury, he scored three penalties in league matches.

At representative level, he was selected for the Glasgow FA's annual challenge match against Sheffield on two occasions, played in the 'Home Scots v Anglo-Scots' international trial in 1905, and then made one appearance for Scotland in 1906.

He married first to Margaret Lawrie Beck in 1904 in Scotland. She died in 1908. He married secondly Florence Williamson in 1910 in Manchester.
