= Andy Bowman =

Scottish footballer (1934–2009)

Personal information
- Full name: Andrew Bowman
- Date of birth: 7 March 1934
- Place of birth: Pittenweem, Fife, Scotland
- Date of death: 2 March 2009 (aged 74)
- Place of death: Dundee, Scotland
- Position: Wing half

Senior career*
Years	Team	Apps	(Gls)
1951–1955	Chelsea	1	(0)
1955–1961	Heart of Midlothian	70	(3)
1961–1963	Newport County	69	(7)
1963–1965	Tonbridge Angels		
1965–1966	Hamilton Academical	11	(0)
1966–1967	Hawick Royal Albert		
1967–1968	Stenhousemuir	12	(0)
Total		163	(10)
- * Club domestic league appearances and goals

Andrew Bowman (7 March 1934 – 2 March 2009) was a Scottish footballer who played most of his career with Hearts. He played as a wing half.

== Playing career ==
Bowman played for the Scotland schoolboys team in 1949. Chelsea signed him on 7 March 1951, his 17th birthday. He played only one game in Chelsea's league team in 1953–54 season.

He moved to Hearts in 1955 for a transfer fee of £1,000. Bowman won the Scottish League in 1957–58 and 1959–60, and the 1959 Scottish League Cup Final while with Hearts. He made 135 appearances for Hearts, scoring eight goals.

He then signed for Newport County in 1961, before moving on to non-league Tonbridge.

After a spell in the United States, he returned to Scotland, playing for Hamilton Academical and Hawick Royal Albert.

== Off the pitch ==
After retiring from football he spent most of his working life with Scottish & Newcastle breweries.

His son David followed him into professional football.

Andy Bowman died on 2 March 2009, following a heart attack, having suffered from Alzheimer's disease during his latter years.
