= 1959–60 Scottish League Cup =

Tournament details
- Country: Scotland

Final positions
- Champions: Heart of Midlothian
- Runners-up: Third Lanark

The 1959–60 Scottish League Cup was the fourteenth season of Scotland's second football knockout competition. The competition was won by Heart of Midlothian for a second successive season, after they defeated Third Lanark 2–1 in the final. Hearts would later go on to become the only Scottish club outside the Old Firm to win a League and League Cup double.

== First round ==
=== Group 1 ===
Team	Pld	W	D	L	GF	GA	GR	Pts
Raith Rovers	6	5	0	1	13	5	2.600	10
Airdrieonians	6	2	2	2	12	10	1.200	6
Celtic	6	2	1	3	9	10	0.900	5
Partick Thistle	6	1	1	4	3	12	0.250	3

Home team	Score	Away team	Date
Partick Thistle	0–0	Airdrieonians	8 August 1959
Raith Rovers	2–1	Celtic	8 August 1959
Airdrieonians	2–3	Raith Rovers	12 August 1959
Celtic	1–2	Partick Thistle	12 August 1959
Airdrieonians	4–2	Celtic	15 August 1959
Raith Rovers	2–0	Partick Thistle	15 August 1959
Airdrieonians	4–0	Partick Thistle	22 August 1959
Celtic	1–0	Raith Rovers	22 August 1959
Partick Thistle	0–2	Celtic	26 August 1959
Raith Rovers	3–0	Airdrieonians	26 August 1959
Celtic	2–2	Airdrieonians	29 August 1959
Partick Thistle	1–3	Raith Rovers	29 August 1959

=== Group 2 ===
Team	Pld	W	D	L	GF	GA	GR	Pts
Third Lanark	6	5	1	0	19	8	2.375	11
Clyde	6	2	2	2	11	9	1.222	6
Dunfermline Athletic	6	2	1	3	9	14	0.643	5
St Mirren	6	1	0	5	8	16	0.500	2

Home team	Score	Away team	Date
Clyde	0–0	Dunfermline Athletic	8 August 1959
St Mirren	2–3	Third Lanark	8 August 1959
Dunfermline Athletic	3–0	St Mirren	12 August 1959
Third Lanark	2–0	Clyde	12 August 1959
Clyde	4–2	St Mirren	15 August 1959
Third Lanark	6–1	Dunfermline Athletic	15 August 1959
Dunfermline Athletic	1–4	Clyde	22 August 1959
Third Lanark	3–1	St Mirren	22 August 1959
Clyde	2–2	Third Lanark	26 August 1959
St Mirren	1–2	Dunfermline Athletic	26 August 1959
Dunfermline Athletic	2–3	Third Lanark	29 August 1959
St Mirren	2–1	Clyde	29 August 1959

=== Group 3 ===
Team	Pld	W	D	L	GF	GA	GR	Pts
Heart of Midlothian	6	4	2	0	16	6	2.667	10
Aberdeen	6	3	1	2	16	15	1.067	7
Kilmarnock	6	2	1	3	13	13	1.000	5
Stirling Albion	6	0	2	4	8	19	0.421	2

Home team	Score	Away team	Date
Aberdeen	3–1	Stirling Albion	8 August 1959
Kilmarnock	0–4	Heart of Midlothian	8 August 1959
Heart of Midlothian	2–2	Aberdeen	12 August 1959
Stirling Albion	2–2	Kilmarnock	12 August 1959
Kilmarnock	2–3	Aberdeen	15 August 1959
Stirling Albion	1–2	Heart of Midlothian	15 August 1959
Heart of Midlothian	2–0	Kilmarnock	22 August 1959
Stirling Albion	2–5	Aberdeen	22 August 1959
Aberdeen	1–4	Heart of Midlothian	26 August 1959
Kilmarnock	5–0	Stirling Albion	26 August 1959
Aberdeen	2–4	Kilmarnock	29 August 1959
Heart of Midlothian	2–2	Stirling Albion	29 August 1959

=== Group 4 ===
Team	Pld	W	D	L	GF	GA	GR	Pts
Motherwell	6	6	0	0	19	8	2.375	12
Rangers	6	4	0	2	18	8	2.250	8
Dundee	6	2	0	4	12	17	0.706	4
Hibernian	6	0	0	6	9	25	0.360	0

Home team	Score	Away team	Date
Hibernian	1–6	Rangers	8 August 1959
Motherwell	4–2	Dundee	8 August 1959
Dundee	4–3	Hibernian	12 August 1959
Rangers	1–2	Motherwell	12 August 1959
Hibernian	1–3	Motherwell	15 August 1959
Rangers	2–0	Dundee	15 August 1959
Dundee	1–4	Motherwell	22 August 1959
Rangers	5–1	Hibernian	22 August 1959
Hibernian	1–3	Dundee	26 August 1959
Motherwell	2–1	Rangers	26 August 1959
Dundee	2–3	Rangers	29 August 1959
Motherwell	4–2	Hibernian	29 August 1959

=== Group 5 ===
Team	Pld	W	D	L	GF	GA	GR	Pts
Falkirk	6	4	1	1	13	7	1.857	9
Ayr United	6	3	2	1	12	8	1.500	8
Hamilton Academical	6	1	2	3	12	16	0.750	4
Berwick Rangers	6	0	3	3	8	14	0.571	3

Home team	Score	Away team	Date
Berwick Rangers	2–3	Ayr United	8 August 1959
Falkirk	3–2	Hamilton Academical	8 August 1959
Ayr United	2–1	Falkirk	12 August 1959
Hamilton Academical	3–3	Berwick Rangers	12 August 1959
Berwick Rangers	0–2	Falkirk	15 August 1959
Hamilton Academical	1–0	Ayr United	15 August 1959
Ayr United	1–1	Berwick Rangers	22 August 1959
Hamilton Academical	2–3	Falkirk	22 August 1959
Berwick Rangers	2–2	Hamilton Academical	26 August 1959
Falkirk	1–1	Ayr United	26 August 1959
Ayr United	5–2	Hamilton Academical	29 August 1959
Falkirk	3–0	Berwick Rangers	29 August 1959

=== Group 6 ===
Team	Pld	W	D	L	GF	GA	GR	Pts
Arbroath	6	4	0	2	11	12	0.917	8
Albion Rovers	6	3	1	2	12	9	1.333	7
Stenhousemuir	6	3	0	3	9	8	1.125	6
Dumbarton	6	1	1	4	9	12	0.750	3

Home team	Score	Away team	Date
Albion Rovers	1–2	Stenhousemuir	8 August 1959
Arbroath	2–0	Dumbarton	8 August 1959
Dumbarton	3–3	Albion Rovers	12 August 1959
Stenhousemuir	2–3	Arbroath	12 August 1959
Arbroath	0–3	Albion Rovers	15 August 1959
Stenhousemuir	0–2	Dumbarton	15 August 1959
Dumbarton	3–4	Arbroath	22 August 1959
Stenhousemuir	3–0	Albion Rovers	22 August 1959
Albion Rovers	1–0	Dumbarton	26 August 1959
Arbroath	1–0	Stenhousemuir	26 August 1959
Albion Rovers	4–1	Arbroath	29 August 1959
Dumbarton	1–2	Stenhousemuir	29 August 1959

=== Group 7 ===
Team	Pld	W	D	L	GF	GA	GR	Pts
East Fife	6	5	1	0	16	1	16.000	11
Brechin City	6	2	3	1	12	9	1.333	7
Queen of the South	6	0	3	3	8	15	0.533	3
Forfar Athletic	6	0	3	3	9	20	0.450	3

Home team	Score	Away team	Date
Brechin City	0–0	East Fife	8 August 1959
Queen of the South	1–1	Forfar Athletic	8 August 1959
East Fife	4–0	Queen of the South	12 August 1959
Forfar Athletic	2–2	Brechin City	12 August 1959
Forfar Athletic	0–3	East Fife	15 August 1959
Queen of the South	2–2	Brechin City	15 August 1959
East Fife	3–0	Brechin City	22 August 1959
Forfar Athletic	4–4	Queen of the South	22 August 1959
Brechin City	6–1	Forfar Athletic	26 August 1959
Queen of the South	0–2	East Fife	26 August 1959
Brechin City	2–1	Queen of the South	29 August 1959
East Fife	4–1	Forfar Athletic	29 August 1959

=== Group 8 ===
Team	Pld	W	D	L	GF	GA	GR	Pts
Cowdenbeath	6	4	2	0	16	9	1.778	10
St Johnstone	6	4	1	1	20	13	1.538	9
Alloa Athletic	6	2	1	3	13	16	0.813	5
Morton	6	0	0	6	6	17	0.353	0

Home team	Score	Away team	Date
Alloa Athletic	4–2	Morton	8 August 1959
Cowdenbeath	3–1	St Johnstone	8 August 1959
Morton	0–2	Cowdenbeath	12 August 1959
St Johnstone	6–3	Alloa Athletic	12 August 1959
Cowdenbeath	4–3	Alloa Athletic	15 August 1959
Morton	2–4	St Johnstone	15 August 1959
Morton	0–1	Alloa Athletic	22 August 1959
St Johnstone	3–3	Cowdenbeath	22 August 1959
Alloa Athletic	1–3	St Johnstone	26 August 1959
Cowdenbeath	3–1	Morton	26 August 1959
Alloa Athletic	1–1	Cowdenbeath	29 August 1959
St Johnstone	3–1	Morton	29 August 1959

=== Group 9 ===
Team	Pld	W	D	L	GF	GA	GR	Pts
Dundee United	4	3	1	0	9	1	9.000	7
Queen's Park	4	3	0	1	8	6	1.333	6
Stranraer	4	2	0	2	7	9	0.778	4
East Stirlingshire	4	1	0	3	7	7	1.000	2
Montrose	4	0	1	3	4	12	0.333	1

Home team	Score	Away team	Date
Dundee United	2–0	East Stirlingshire	8 August 1959
Queen's Park	4–1	Stranraer	8 August 1959
East Stirlingshire	1–2	Queen's Park	12 August 1959
Montrose	1–1	Dundee United	12 August 1959
Dundee United	2–0	Stranraer	15 August 1959
East Stirlingshire	5–1	Montrose	15 August 1959
Montrose	0–2	Queen's Park	22 August 1959
Stranraer	2–1	East Stirlingshire	22 August 1959
Queen's Park	0–4	Dundee United	29 August 1959
Stranraer	4–2	Montrose	29 August 1959

== Supplementary round ==
=== First leg ===
Home team	Score	Away team	Date
Falkirk	1–1	Dundee United	31 August 1959

=== Second leg ===
Home team	Score	Away team	Date	Agg
Dundee United	0–3	Falkirk	2 September 1959	1–4

== Quarter-finals ==
=== First leg ===
Home team	Score	Away team	Date
Cowdenbeath	3–1	East Fife	9 September 1959
Motherwell	1–1	Heart of Midlothian	9 September 1959
Raith Rovers	2–2	Arbroath	9 September 1959
Third Lanark	2–1	Falkirk	9 September 1959

=== Second leg ===
Home team	Score	Away team	Date	Agg
Arbroath	2–1	Raith Rovers	16 September 1959	4–3
East Fife	1–2	Cowdenbeath	16 September 1959	2–5
Falkirk	0–3	Third Lanark	16 September 1959	1–5
Heart of Midlothian	6–2	Motherwell	16 September 1959	7–3

== Semi-finals ==
Home team	Score	Away team	Date
Heart of Midlothian	9–3	Cowdenbeath	7 October 1959
Third Lanark	3–0	Arbroath	7 October 1959

== Final ==
24 October 1959

Heart of Midlothian	2–1	Third Lanark
Hamilton 57'; Young 59'		McInnes 2'

Hampden Park, Glasgow
Attendance: 57,994
