= Colin Hampton =

Scottish footballer

Personal information
- Full name: Colin McKenzie Hampton
- Date of birth: 1 September 1888
- Place of birth: Brechin, Scotland
- Date of death: 17 January 1968 (aged 79)
- Place of death: Stracathro, Scotland
- Height: 5 ft 11 in (1.80 m)
- Position: Goalkeeper

Youth career
- Brechin Arnot
- –1906: Brechin Hearts

Senior career*
Years	Team	Apps	(Gls)
1906–1907	Brechin Rovers		
1907–1909	Brechin City		
1909–1914	Motherwell	134	(0)
1914–1925	Chelsea	79	(0)
1925	Brechin City	9	(0)
1925–1926	Crystal Palace	3	(0)

International career
1912	Scottish League XI	1	(0)
- * Club domestic league appearances and goals

Colin Hampton MM (1 September 1888 – 17 January 1968) was a Scottish professional footballer who played as a goalkeeper in the Football League for Chelsea and Crystal Palace. He also played in the Scottish League for Motherwell and hometown club Brechin City. He made one appearance for the Scottish League XI in 1912.

== Personal life ==
Hampton's second cousin Harry was also a footballer and the pair played together at Brechin City. In August 1915, one year since the outbreak of the First World War, Hampton enlisted in the Royal Field Artillery, but by December he had become a gunner in the Motor Machine Gun Service. Three months later he was promoted to corporal while serving with the 28th Battery. By 1918 he had risen to the rank of sergeant and was serving as a machine gunner in the Machine Gun Corps (Motors) in Mesopotamia. Hampton was taken prisoner by the Ottoman Army later that year when his armoured car was wrecked by shellfire. During the march to Constantinople, he and his fellow prisoners were released after the armistice was declared and he was awarded the Military Medal in 1919. He was demobilised in May 1919. After the war, Hampton ran a confectionery shop in Brechin and worked in a factory in Coventry and as a special constable during the Second World War. He died of emphysema at Stracathro Hospital in January 1968.

== Career statistics ==
Appearances and goals by club, season and competition
Club	Season	League			National Cup		Total	
Club	Season	Division	Apps	Goals	Apps	Goals	Apps	Goals
Motherwell	1909–10	Scottish First Division	4	0	0	0	4	0
Motherwell	1910–11	Scottish First Division	32	0	4	0	36	0
Motherwell	1911–12	Scottish First Division	32	0	6	0	38	0
Motherwell	1912–13	Scottish First Division	31	0	3	0	34	0
Motherwell	1913–14	Scottish First Division	35	0	4	0	39	0
Motherwell	Total		134	0	17	0	151	0
Chelsea	1913–14	First Division	1	0	0	0	1	0
Chelsea	1914–15	First Division	1	0	0	0	1	0
Chelsea	1919–20	First Division	15	0	0	0	15	0
Chelsea	1920–21	First Division	6	0	0	0	6	0
Chelsea	1921–22	First Division	9	0	0	0	9	0
Chelsea	1922–23	First Division	25	0	3	0	28	0
Chelsea	1923–24	First Division	22	0	0	0	22	0
Chelsea	Total		79	0	3	0	82	0
Brechin City	1925–26	Scottish Third Division	9	0	3	0	12	0
Career total			222	0	23	0	245	0

== Honours ==
Motherwell

- Lanarkshire Cup: 1911–12

Chelsea

- London Challenge Cup: 1919–20
