= Southern F.C. (Glasgow) =

Former association football club in Scotland

Southern
- Full name: Southern Football Club
- Founded: 1871
- Dissolved: 1875 (converted to rugby)
- Ground: Albert Park
- Secretary: Robert Ramsey Kerland
Home colours

Southern Football Club was a 19th-century football club based in Crosshill, Glasgow.

== History ==
The club was founded in 1871, out of the Southern Cricket Club, and originally played under both association rules and rugby union rules.

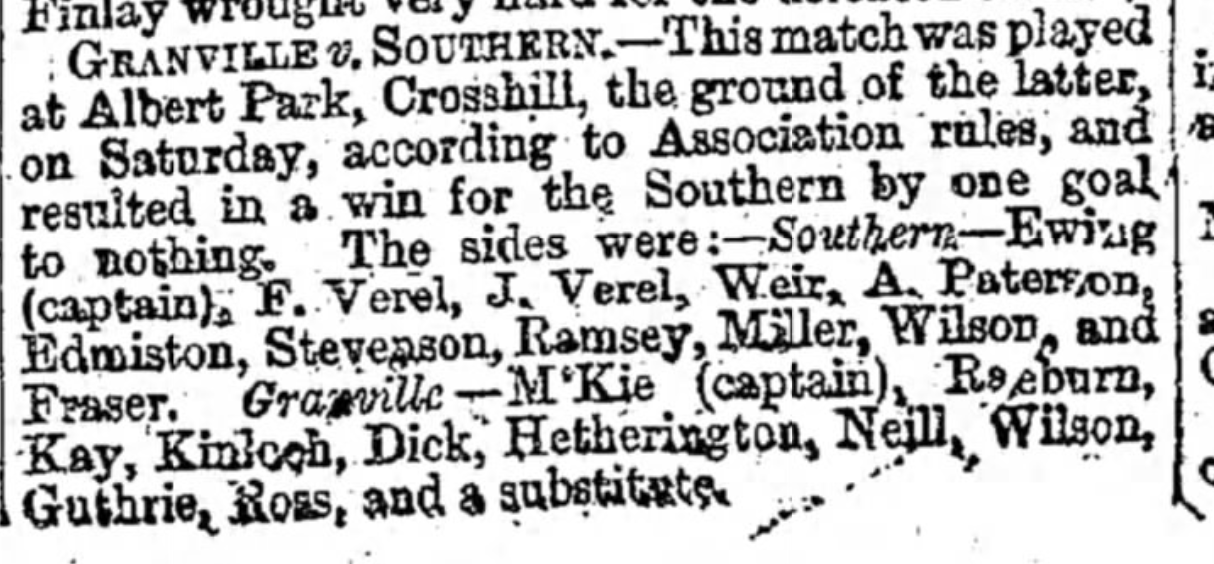
Match report for Southern v Granville, 1 February 1873

Southern was one of the original 16 teams to enter the inaugural Scottish Cup. It was the last entrant, and the only club not to donate to the cost of the Cup. The club was drawn to play the Third Lanarkshire Rifle Volunteers, but scratched, and the club did not enter the competition again.

The club continued to play association football in 1873–74, but it does not seem to have played any association matches in 1874–75. By 1875 the club had dropped the association football section and was solely playing rugby.

== Colours ==
The club wore red and white jerseys and stockings, with blue knickerbockers.

== Ground ==
The club played at Albert Park in Crosshill. As a rugby club it played at Mossfield Park in Strathbungo.
