= Joe McInnes =

Scottish footballer (1932–2021)

Joseph Clarke McInnes (9 December 1932 – 29 August 2021) was a Scottish footballer who played for Kilmarnock, Larkhall Thistle, Hamilton, Partick Thistle, Accrington Stanley, Third Lanark, Stirling Albion and Bangor. Coincidentally, both Accrington Stanley and Third Lanark were to go out of business soon after McInnes had left each club.

McInnes scored the goal for Third Lanark in the 1959 Scottish League Cup Final as they lost 2–1 to Hearts.
