= Glasgow Perthshire Charitable Society =

Glasgow Perthshire Charitable Society is a charity registered in Scotland.

== The society ==
The Glasgow Perthshire Charitable Society was founded in 1835, and is one of the oldest charities in Scotland still in existence. Today it is generally referred to as "The Glasgow Perthshire". The society is based in Glasgow, though its directors and members reside in various parts of Scotland.

=== Charity registration ===
The society is registered with the Office of the Scottish Charity Regulator (OSCR) with Registered Charity No. SC009576. The society's entry on the OSCR web site contains basic information and financial details of the society. The society has been a registered charity since 7 May 1895 (although it was founded sixty years earlier in 1835).

=== Mission and remit ===
Today the society primarily provides bursaries to students from the county of Perthshire attending one of Glasgow's universities or higher education institutions. Historically, the society provided grants and pensions to senior citizens and others from Perthshire who lived in Glasgow and met the appropriate criteria.

=== Board of directors ===
The society is run by the board of directors, chaired by the Preses (an old Scots word meaning Presiding Officer – for example see Preses o the Scots Pairlament), and comprising a Treasurer, Secretary, and ordinary board members who take on duties such as Bursary Coordinator and Grants Coordinator. The Board run the society in their spare time and receive no remuneration for their work.

=== History ===
The society was formed in 1835 originally to provide assistance to those whose had moved to Glasgow from Perthshire seeking employment, and had fallen on hard times. The society has frequently been mentioned in the press over the years, with some examples provided on the society's web site.

The earliest known reference to the society in the press is in The Glasgow Herald of 16 Dec 1857, a report of the society's annual dinner. The most recent press article found so far is from 13 Dec 1965.

In 1985, a celebration of the 150th anniversary of the society was hosted by the City Council in Glasgow City Chambers, attended by members, directors, grantees, pensioners, bursars, members of the City Council, and the Lord Lieutenant of Perth and Kinross.

=== Website ===
The society web site contains up to date information about the society, including the current board of directors, bursaries, and grants.

The society's web site is currently maintained by one of the directors, Alastair F. Brown, and is hosted on BrownNet.
