= William McIntosh (politician) =

Soldier and politician from Massachusetts

William McIntosh was a soldier and politician from Massachusetts.

McIntosh born in Dedham, Massachusetts. He later moved to Needham in the mid-1760s. During the American Revolution, McIntosh served as a colonel in the 1st Suffolk Regiment. He saw action at Dorchester Heights, Castle Island, Fishkill, and at other battles in New York.

McIntosh served in a number of elected positions, including 12 years as a selectman in Needham between 1767 and 1792. In 1775, he was Needham's delegate to the Third Provincial Congress and between 1775 and 1783 served five one year terms as its representative to the Great and General Court.

When George Washington arrived in Needham following his election as president, McIntosh and a group of other townsmen greeted him at the town line. Washington is said to have greeted him by name. Martha Washington gave McIntosh a kerchief with the commander-in-chief's image upon it.
