= George McCallum (footballer) =

Scottish footballer (1935–2022)

Personal information
- Full name: George Thomson McCallum
- Date of birth: 24 August 1935
- Place of birth: Stirling, Scotland
- Date of death: 18 March 2022 (aged 86)
- Place of death: Stirling, Scotland
- Position: Centre half

Senior career*
Years	Team	Apps	(Gls)
–	Camelon Juniors		
1958–1962	Third Lanark	41	(0)

International career
1959	SFL trial v SFA	1	(0)
- * Club domestic league appearances and goals

George Thomson McCallum (24 August 1935 – 18 March 2022) was a Scottish footballer who played for Third Lanark as a centre half.

In his short career, which only began at senior level after he undertook his National Service, he showed sufficient promise to be selected for a trial match between a Scottish Football League XI team and a Scottish Football Association team in March 1959, and in October of that year played in the 1959 Scottish League Cup Final, a 2–1 defeat for Thirds against Heart of Midlothian, in which he acknowledged culpability for the winning goal. Four days later, in a Scottish Football League fixture between the same teams rearranged to accommodate the cup final, he suffered a knee injury which halted his progress and ultimately forced him to quit the game by 1962.

He later worked manufacturing thermal insulation, and attended numerous events remembering Third Lanark (the club, which had finished 3rd in the 1960–61 Scottish Division One table, went defunct in 1967).
