= William MacKintosh (fur trader) =

William MacKintosh was a fur trader in the early 19th Century, spending much of that time at posts on Peace River, Athabasca River, and other upper tributaries to the Mackenzie River.

When he began his career as a fur trader, there was a rivalry between the older Hudson's Bay Company, founded in 1670, and the newer Northwest Company. The rivalry was particular intense in the regions that drained into Great Slave Lake, where MacKintosh was posted, and when a nearby Hudson's Bay Company outpost ran out of food, during the winter, of 1815, he not only declined to share provisions with them, but influenced the local First Nations peoples to also not provide them with food. The result was “No less than 15 men, 1 clerk with a woman and child died of starvation going up Peace River.”

The management of the Northwest Company rewarded MacKintosh for his aggressiveness by making him a partner, in 1816. But when the two companies merged, in 1821, new HBC colleagues remembered his callousness.
