= Johnny Hamilton (footballer, born 1935) =

Scottish footballer

Personal information
- Full name: John Hamilton
- Date of birth: 22 January 1935
- Place of birth: Larkhall, Scotland
- Date of death: 8 August 2013 (aged 78)
- Place of death: Edinburgh, Scotland
- Position: Right winger

Youth career
- Lesmahagow

Senior career*
Years	Team	Apps	(Gls)
1955–1967	Heart of Midlothian	293	(75)
1967–1968	Watford	8	(2)
1968–1971	Berwick Rangers	71	(14)
Total		372	(91)

International career
1956–1957	Scotland U23	2	(1)
1958	Scottish League XI	1	(0)
1960	SFL trial v SFA	1	(0)
- * Club domestic league appearances and goals

Johnny Hamilton (22 January 1935 – 8 August 2013) was a Scottish footballer, who played for Hearts, Watford and Berwick Rangers.

He scored 157 goals in 496 appearances for Hearts between 1955 and 1967.

Hamilton played for the Scottish League XI once, in 1958. After retiring as a football player, Hamilton coached the Hearts youth team between 1974 and 1979. He then ran a newsagents in Slateford Road, Edinburgh. Hamilton died in August 2013, aged 78.

Johnny married Elizabeth Farquhar and had three children, Karen, Ross and Gary.
