= Bobby Craig (footballer, born 1935) =

Scottish footballer

Personal information
- Full name: Robert McAllister Craig
- Date of birth: 8 April 1935
- Place of birth: Airdrie, Scotland
- Date of death: 1 October 2010 (aged 75)
- Place of death: Toronto, Canada
- Position: Inside forward

Youth career
- Blantyre Celtic

Senior career*
Years	Team	Apps	(Gls)
1955–1959	Third Lanark	124	(61)
1959–1962	Sheffield Wednesday	84	(25)
1962	Blackburn Rovers	8	(3)
1962–1963	Celtic	17	(13)
1963–1964	St Johnstone	11	(2)
1964–1965	Oldham Athletic	18	(4)
1965	Toronto City	7	(1)
1965–1966	Johannesburg Wanderers	7	(3)
1967	Third Lanark	9	(1)
- * Club domestic league appearances and goals

Bobby Craig (8 April 1935 – 1 October 2010) was a Scottish footballer who played for Third Lanark, Sheffield Wednesday, Blackburn Rovers, Celtic, St Johnstone, Oldham Athletic, Toronto City and Johannesburg Wanderers as an inside-right. Craig played in the final match played by Third Lanark before the club went out of business. After retiring as a player he settled in Toronto, where he died aged 75.
