= 1904–05 Scottish Cup =

Tournament details
- Country: Scotland

Final positions
- Champions: Third Lanark
- Runners-up: Rangers

The 1904–05 Scottish Cup was the 32nd season of Scotland's most prestigious football knockout competition. The Cup was won by Third Lanark when they beat Rangers 3–1 in a replay.

== Calendar ==
Round	First match date	Fixtures	Clubs
First round	28 January 1905	16	32 → 16
Second round	11 February 1905	8	16 → 8
Quarter-finals	25 February 1905	4	8 → 4
Semi-finals	25 March 1905	2	4 → 2
Final	8 April 1905	1	2 → 1

== First round ==
Home team	Score	Away team
Aberdeen	2 – 1	Queens Park
Airdrieonians	7 – 0	St Johnstone
Arthurlie	0 – 0	Motherwell
Bathgate	2 – 1	Arbroath
Cowdenbeath	2 – 0	6th GRV
Dumfries	1 – 2	Celtic
Dundee	1 – 3	Hearts
Hibernian	1 – 1	Partick Thistle
Kilmarnock	2 – 2	Beith
Kirkcaldy United	3 – 1	Crieff Morrisonians
Lochgelly United	5 – 1	Inverness Caledonian
Greenock Morton	2 – 0	Renton
Port Glasgow Athletic	3 – 0	Stranraer
Rangers	2 – 1	Ayr Parkhouse
St Mirren	1 – 0	Clyde
Third Lanark	4 – 1	Leith Athletic

=== First round replay ===
Home team	Score	Away team
Beith	3 – 1	Kilmarnock
Motherwell	1 – 0	Arthurlie
Partick Thistle	4 – 2	Hibernian

== Second round ==
Home team	Score	Away team
Aberdeen	1 – 1	Bathgate*
Airdrieonians	3 – 0	Port Glasgow Athletic
Beith	4 – 0	Cowdenbeath
Celtic	3 – 0	Lochgelly United
Kirkcaldy United	0 – 1	Partick Thistle
Greenock Morton	0 – 6	Rangers
Motherwell	0 – 1	Third Lanark
St Mirren	2 – 1	Heart of Midlothian

- Game Abandoned

=== Second round replay ===
Home team	Score	Away team
Aberdeen	6 – 1	Bathgate

== Quarter-final ==
Home team	Score	Away team
Celtic	3 – 0	Partick Thistle
Rangers	5 – 1	Beith
St Mirren	0 – 0	Airdrieonians
Third Lanark	4 – 1	Aberdeen

=== Quarter-final replay ===
Home team	Score	Away team
Airdrieonians	3 – 1	St Mirren

== Semi-finals ==
25 March 1905 (Note: Game Abandoned on 80 minutes due to crowd disturbance, result stood.)

Celtic	0–2	Rangers
		Speedie 65'; Robertson 79'

Celtic Park, Glasgow
Attendance: 30,000
Referee: T. Robertson

25 March 1905

Third Lanark	2–1	Airdrieonians
Wilson; Johnston		Thomson

Cathkin Park, Glasgow
Attendance: 14,000
Referee: J. Baillie

== Final ==
8 April 1905

Third Lanark	0–0	Rangers

Hampden Park
Attendance: 54,000
Referee: T. Robertson

=== Final replay ===
15 April 1905

Third Lanark	3–1	Rangers
Wilson; Johnston		Smith

Hampden Park
Attendance: 30,000
Referee: J. Deans

=== Teams ===
Rangers:
GK	Tom Sinclair
RB	Alex Fraser
LB	Alex Craig
RH	George Henderson
CH	James Stark
LH	John Robertson
OR	Robert Hamilton
IR	Finlay Speedie
CF	Robert McColl
IL	Archie Kyle
OL	Alex Smith
Replay:	Tommy Low replaced Hamilton

Third Lanark:
GK	Jimmy Raeside
RB	Robert Barr
LB	William McIntosh
RH	James Comrie
CH	Tom Sloan
LH	John Neilson
OR	James Johnston
IR	Jack Kidd
CF	Thomas McKenzie
IL	Hughie Wilson
OL	David Munro
Replay:	Unchanged

== See also ==
- 1904–05 in Scottish football
