= 1889 Scottish Cup final =

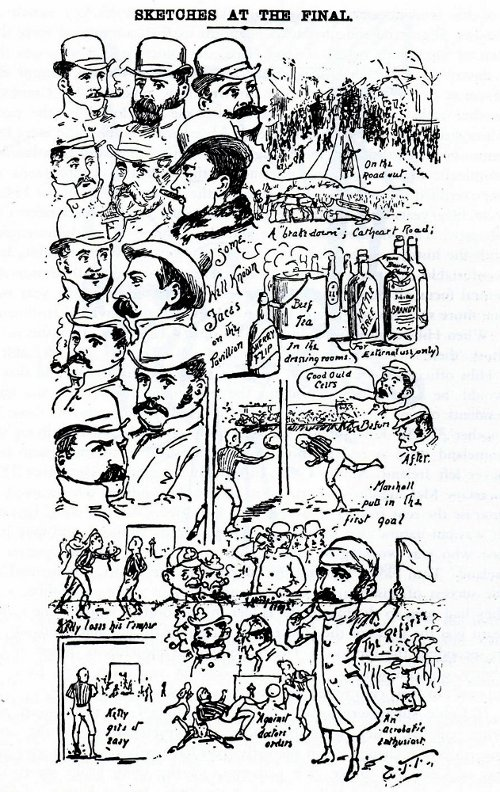
- Illustration from 'The Scottish Referee' newspaper
- Event: 1888–89 Scottish Cup
Celtic	Third Lanark
0	3
Celtic	Third Lanark
- Date: 2 February 1889
- Venue: Hampden Park, Crosshill
- Referee: Charles Campbell
- Attendance: 18,000
- Weather: Snow showers

Replay
Celtic	Third Lanark
1	2
- Date: 9 February 1889
- Venue: Hampden Park, Crosshill
- Referee: Charles Campbell
- Attendance: 16,000
- Weather: Fine

The 1889 Scottish Cup final, colloquially known as the Snow final, was a football match played on 2 February 1889 at Hampden Park in Crosshill (today part of Glasgow) and was the final of the 16th staging of the Scottish Cup. Celtic and Third Lanark (then know officially as 3rd Lanarkshire Rifle Volunteers) contested the match.

Third Lanark won the match 3–0. Due to the poor conditions and the unplayable nature of the pitch through snow, the match was ordered to be replayed the following week on 9 February 1889, where Third Lanark won again with a 2–1 victory.

The match was Third Lanark's first Scottish Cup and in Celtic's inaugural season it was their first appearance in the Scottish Cup final.

== Road to the final ==
Third Lanark had a bye in the first round and did not enter the competition until round two. Both teams had to replay games en route to the final.

This was Celtic's first season in the Scottish Cup and indeed football, so making it to the final was quite an achievement. Their debut was a spectacular 5–1 win against Shettleston with John O'Connor scoring all five goals. Celtic eased through subsequent rounds with ease until they met Clyde in round five. Clyde won the match 1–0, but Celtic appealed the match as unplayable. Clyde had started the game in illegal footwear and by the time they changed into legal footwear, the match started late and it finished in darkness. Celtic appealed for the match to be replayed and as it was deemed unplayable by the end, the appeal went in Celtic's favour. On the replay Celtic easily routed Clyde, beating them 9–2 at Parkhead. Subsequently, Clyde appealed against the decision to replay the game, but were overruled and Celtic went through.

Third Lanark had an even more prolonged route to the final with the matches against Queens Park and Abercorn having to be replayed following appeals. The Abercorn match went to a third replay before Third Lanark finally went through.

Typical of football at the time, there were several high-scoring games, with Celtic scoring 36 goals and Third Lanark 41 goals en route to the final.

Celtic				Round	Third Lanark			
Home team	Score	Away team	Celtic scorer(s)	Round	Home team	Score	Away team	Third Lanark scorer(s)
Celtic	5–1	Shettleston	O'Connor	Round One	Bye to the second round			
Celtic	8–0	Cowlairs	McCallum; Dunbar; T Maley; Kelly; Groves	Round Two	Kelvinside Athletic	0–8	Third Lanark	unknown
Celtic	4–1	Albion Rovers	Gallagher; Groves; Dunbar; T Maley	Round Three	Third Lanark	2–1	Queens Park	unknown
				Replay	Third Lanark	4–2	Queens Park	unknown
St Bernard's	1–4	Celtic	McCallum; T Maley; Groves	Round Four	Third Lanark	7–1	Hurlford	unknown
Clyde	1–0	Celtic		Round Five	Third Lanark	5–4	Abercorn	unknown
Celtic	9–2	Clyde	T Maley 6' 27'; McLaren 10'; McCallum 47'; Groves 70'	Replay	Abercorn	2–2	Third Lanark	unknown
				2nd Replay	Abercorn	2–2	Third Lanark	unknown
				3rd Replay	Abercorn	1–3	Third Lanark	unknown
East Stirlingshire	1–2	Celtic	McCallum	Round Six	Third Lanark	6–1	Campsie	unknown
Dumbarton	1–4	Celtic	Groves; Dunbar	Semi-finals	Third Lanark	2–0	Renton	Oswald; Hannah

== First match ==
Snow showers and strong winds had affected Glasgow on 2 February 1889. Around 11 am the officials decided that although there was a light covering of snow, the ground was playable. However, further heavy snow showers continued into the afternoon and by the time kick-off came, the pitch was ankle deep. It was decided that the match should be played, but both teams played under protest and agreed that, as the pitch was unplayable, the match would be treated as a friendly. The players threw snowballs at each other as they ran onto the pitch.

With the wind at their backs, Celtic made most of the early pressure, but despite that went a goal down in the 20th minute after Johnstone centred to Marshall to give Third Lanark the lead. In the second half Third Lanark had most of the pressure and went 2–0 up after Celtic goalkeeper Kelly dropped the snow-covered ball to let John Oswald score. Third Lanark continued to dominate the match and Hannah wrapped the game up for them with a third goal a minute from time.

The match attendance of 18,000 was a record for Scottish football at the time.

=== Match details ===
2 February 1889
15:00

Celtic	0–3	Third Lanark
		Marshall 20'; John Oswald 55'; Hannah 90'

Hampden Park, Crosshill
Attendance: 18,000
Referee: Charles Campbell

=== Teams ===
Celtic:
GK	(Scotland) John Kelly
RB	(Scotland) Paddy Gallacher
LB	(Scotland) Michael McKeown
RH	(Scotland) Willie Maley
CH	(Scotland) James Kelly
LH	(Scotland) James McLaren
OR	(Scotland) Neil McCallum
IR	(Scotland) Michael Dunbar
CF	(Scotland) Willie Groves
IL	(Scotland) John Coleman
OL	(Scotland) Tom Maley

Third Lanark:
GK	(Scotland) Robert Downie
RB	(Scotland) Andrew Thomson
LB	(Scotland) John Rae
RH	(Scotland) Alex Lochhead
CH	(Scotland) John Auld
LH	(Scotland) Robert McFarlane
OR	(Scotland) John Marshall
IR	(Scotland) John Oswald
CF	(Scotland) Jimmy Oswald
IL	(Scotland) William Johnstone
OL	(Scotland) Jimmy Hannah

- Both teams unchanged for replay.

== Aftermath ==
Two days later, on 4 February 1889, a special meeting of the Scottish Football Association was held to discuss the match. Both teams claimed that prior to the match they had agreed that because of the poor playing conditions it would be played as a friendly. Although a signed document was produced to show that the teams had agreed to play the match as a friendly, it was challenged by some members. Airdrieonians representative Mr Reid moved that the agreement should not be recognised and the result should stand. The referee, Charles Campbell, and his umpires were then questioned and stated that the ground had been unplayable. Following this admission it was unanimously agreed that the tie be replayed the following Saturday.

== Replay ==
The replay took place the following week on 9 February 1889, this time in fine conditions, though on a hard pitch. Attendance at the match is believed to have been as many as 18,000–20,000 spectators. Shortly before kickoff Third Lanark handed in a protest about having to play on the pitch and having to replay the match. Despite their protest the game went ahead, and as Third Lanark won the toss they chose to play with the wind on their back.

The teams were evenly matched in the early stages, but Celtic's Coleman had to retire early injured and so Celtic had to play the remainder of the match with ten men. Third Lanark then had the bulk of possession, but it was Celtic who went closest as McCallum hit the post. The deadlock was broken in the 23rd minute when Third Lanark's Marshall scrambled the ball home from close range; Kelly saved the shot but it was judged to have crossed the line. In the second half, Celtic had most of the pressure and spurned a number of chances before a McCallum header equalised for them in the 67th minute. Despite Celtic bossing the remainder of the match, it was Third Lanark who scored next with John Oswald scoring the winner late in the game. This was the first of Third Lanark's two Scottish Cups; they won again in 1905.

=== Match details ===
9 February 1889
15:00

Celtic	1–2	Third Lanark
McCallum 67'		Marshall 23'; John Oswald

Hampden Park, Crosshill
Attendance: 16,000
Referee: Charles Campbell

== See also ==
- 1889 World Championship (football)
