= 1903–04 Scottish Division One =

11th season of top-tier football league in Scotland

Scottish Division One
- Season: 1903–04
- Champions: Third Lanark; 1st title
- Matches: 182
- Goals: 620 (3.41 per match)
- Top goalscorer: Robert Hamilton (28 goals)

The 1903–04 Scottish Division One season was won by Third Lanark by four points over nearest rival Heart of Midlothian. The top division of Scottish football expanded from 12 to 14 teams, and Airdrieonians and Motherwell joined the division having finished first and second in Division Two the previous season.

== League table ==
| Pos | Team | Pld | W | D | L | GF | GA | GD | Pts | Qualification or relegation |
|---|---|---|---|---|---|---|---|---|---|---|
| 1 | Third Lanark (C) | 26 | 20 | 3 | 3 | 61 | 26 | +35 | 43 | Champions |
| 2 | Heart of Midlothian | 26 | 18 | 3 | 5 | 63 | 35 | +28 | 39 | |
| =3 | Celtic | 26 | 18 | 2 | 6 | 68 | 27 | +41 | 38 | |
| =3 | Rangers | 26 | 16 | 6 | 4 | 80 | 33 | +47 | 38 | |
| 5 | Dundee | 26 | 13 | 2 | 11 | 54 | 45 | +9 | 28 | |
| =6 | St Mirren | 26 | 11 | 5 | 10 | 45 | 38 | +7 | 27 | |
| =6 | Partick Thistle | 26 | 10 | 7 | 9 | 46 | 41 | +5 | 27 | |
| 8 | Queen's Park | 26 | 6 | 9 | 11 | 28 | 47 | −19 | 21 | |
| 9 | Port Glasgow Athletic | 26 | 8 | 4 | 14 | 32 | 49 | −17 | 20 | |
| 10 | Hibernian | 26 | 7 | 5 | 14 | 29 | 40 | −11 | 19 | |
| =11 | Morton | 26 | 7 | 4 | 15 | 32 | 53 | −21 | 18 | |
| =11 | Airdrieonians | 26 | 7 | 4 | 15 | 32 | 62 | −30 | 18 | |
| 13 | Motherwell | 26 | 6 | 3 | 17 | 26 | 61 | −35 | 15 | |
| 14 | Kilmarnock | 26 | 4 | 5 | 17 | 24 | 63 | −39 | 13 | |

Source: nozdrul.plus.com
(C) Champions

== Results ==
| Home \ Away | AIR | CEL | DND | HOM | HIB | KIL | MOR | MOT | PAR | PGA | QPA | RAN | STM | THI |
|---|---|---|---|---|---|---|---|---|---|---|---|---|---|---|
| Airdrieonians | | 4–3 | 2–1 | 1–2 | 0–2 | 1–2 | 1–3 | 2–1 | 2–2 | 1–0 | 0–1 | 1–3 | 3–1 | 0–4 |
| Celtic | 3–0 | | 4–2 | 4–0 | 1–0 | 6–1 | 5–1 | 6–0 | 2–1 | 4–1 | 3–0 | 2–2 | 3–1 | 1–3 |
| Dundee | 4–3 | 2–1 | | 2–1 | 1–2 | 4–0 | 6–0 | 7–1 | 3–0 | 3–1 | 3–0 | 3–1 | 1–1 | 0–1 |
| Heart of Midlothian | 5–0 | 2–1 | 4–2 | | 2–0 | 2–1 | 1–0 | 5–0 | 4–1 | 2–0 | 3–1 | 2–1 | 5–1 | 4–1 |
| Hibernian | 4–0 | 0–2 | 0–1 | 2–4 | | 2–2 | 2–0 | 2–1 | 2–2 | 4–1 | 1–1 | 1–2 | 2–1 | 0–2 |
| Kilmarnock | 0–2 | 1–6 | 1–2 | 2–3 | 0–0 | | 1–1 | 2–1 | 1–3 | 0–4 | 2–1 | 2–2 | 2–0 | 1–2 |
| Morton | 3–1 | 0–1 | 1–1 | 1–2 | 3–1 | 4–2 | | 2–3 | 1–3 | 0–1 | 2–1 | 0–5 | 1–0 | 1–2 |
| Motherwell | 1–2 | 1–2 | 1–3 | 0–4 | 1–0 | 2–0 | 0–0 | | 2–0 | 1–0 | 2–4 | 2–5 | 1–0 | 0–2 |
| Partick Thistle | 3–0 | 0–4 | 6–1 | 1–1 | 3–1 | 4–0 | 2–1 | 2–2 | | 1–0 | 2–0 | 1–4 | 1–1 | 2–2 |
| Port Glasgow Athletic | 2–2 | 2–3 | 1–0 | 1–1 | 3–1 | 4–1 | 2–0 | 4–3 | 1–2 | | 2–1 | 1–1 | 0–1 | 0–1 |
| Queen's Park | 1–1 | 1–0 | 2–1 | 2–2 | 3–1 | 1–1 | 1–1 | 1–0 | 1–1 | 0–0 | | 2–3 | 0–0 | 2–8 |
| Rangers | 5–0 | 0–0 | 6–1 | 5–1 | 1–1 | 3–0 | 3–1 | 3–0 | 2–0 | 8–1 | 5–0 | | 2–2 | 4–3 |
| St Mirren | 5–2 | 0–1 | 2–0 | 3–0 | 3–0 | 3–0 | 3–2 | 0–0 | 1–0 | 5–1 | 3–1 | 5–4 | | 1–2 |
| Third Lanark | 1–1 | 3–1 | 4–1 | 2–1 | 2–0 | 3–2 | 1–2 | 3–0 | 1–0 | 3–0 | 0–0 | 1–0 | 4–2 | |

Legend: Blue = home team win; Yellow = draw; Red = away team win.
