= Third Lanark A.C. =

Former association football club in Scotland

Third Lanark
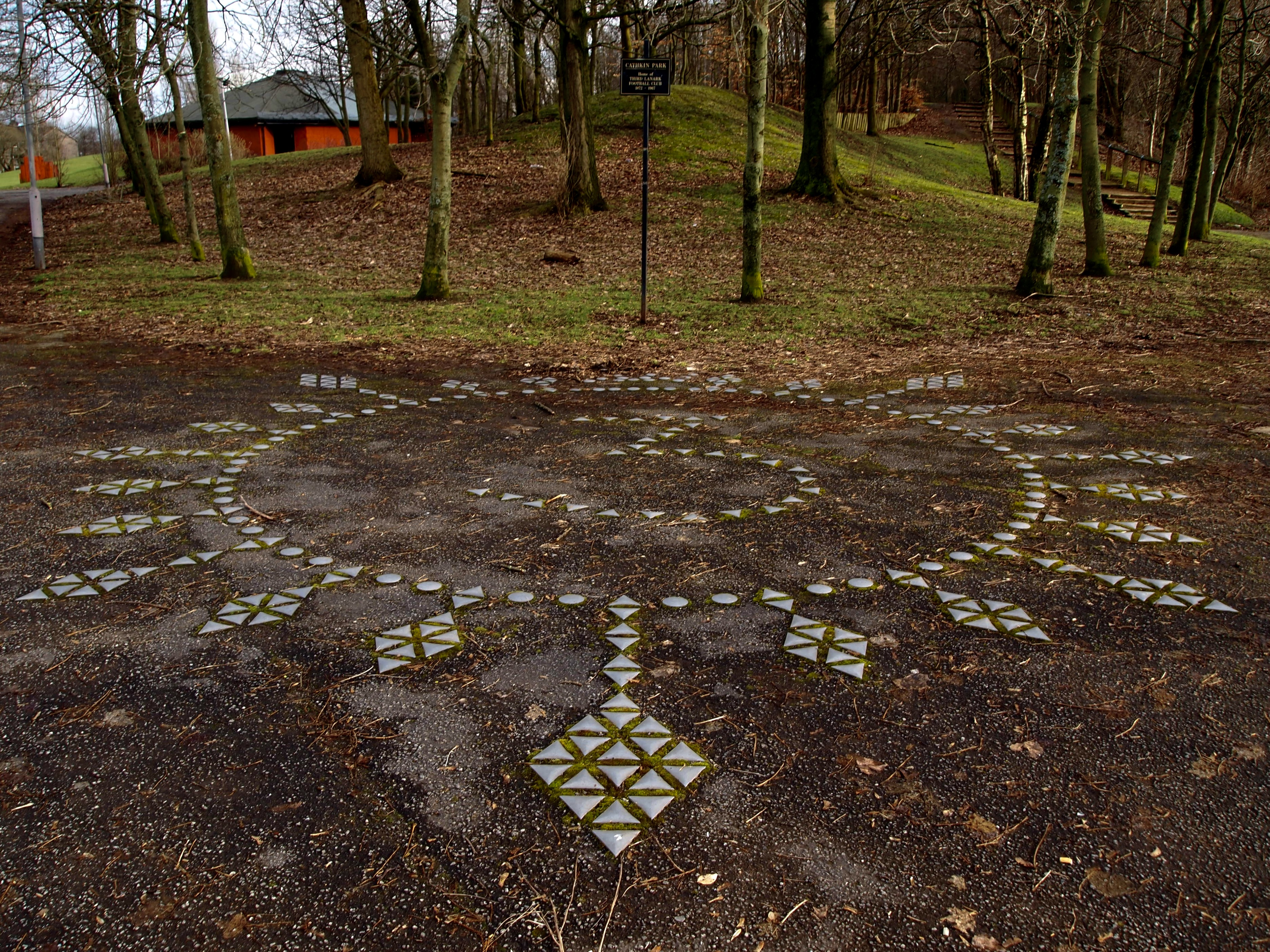
- Third Lanark A.C. badge embedded at New Cathkin Park
- Full name: Third Lanark Athletic Club
- Nicknames: Thirds, Warriors, Redcoats, The Hi-Hi
- Founded: 1872; 154 years ago
- Dissolved: 1967; 59 years ago
- Ground: Cathkin Park, Crosshill, Glasgow
Home colours

Third Lanark Athletic Club was a Scottish football club based in Glasgow. Founded in 1872 as an offshoot of the 3rd Lanarkshire Rifle Volunteers, the club was a founder member of the Scottish Football Association (SFA) in 1872 and the Scottish Football League (SFL) in 1890. Third Lanark played in the top division of the SFL for the majority of the club's existence, and won the league championship in 1903–04. The club also won the Scottish Cup twice, in 1889 and 1905. Third Lanark went out of business in 1967 as a result of mismanagement, six years after having finished in third place in the SFL. Third Lanark's former ground, Cathkin Park in Crosshill, is still partially standing and is used for Amateur league football.

== History ==
=== Foundation and expansion ===
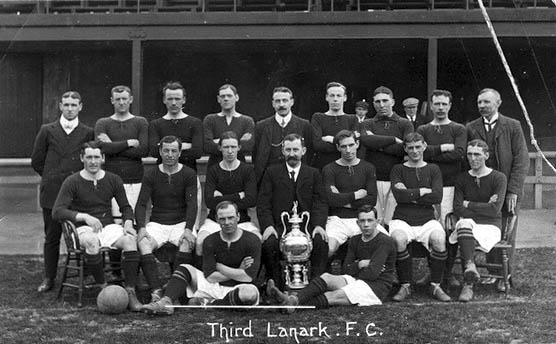
The 1904 Third Lanark team posing with the Glasgow Cup trophy - they would end the season as Scottish champions

Third Lanark started as the football team of the Third Lanarkshire Rifle Volunteers (3rd LRV), part of the Volunteer Force. The team was formally founded on 12 December 1872 at a meeting of the Third Lanarkshire Rifle Volunteers in the Regimental Orderly Room in Howard Street, Glasgow. The soldiers, inspired by the first ever international friendly which had taken place two weeks previously, decided to form their own team. Several of the Scotland team in that match, made up solely of Queen's Park players, had been part of the regiment: including Billy Dickson, Billy MacKinnon and Joseph Taylor. In its early years, the club was successful in shooting competitions, with members winning the prestigious 'Queen's Prize' (still contested today as an event within the Commonwealth Games).

A later meeting decided that the playing kit should be: "A cowl – one end blue, the other yellow, a scarlet guernsey. Blue trousers or knickerbockers with blue stockings." It was later decided that all guernseys should have the number three on them, and at the first AGM in March 1873, the constitution was amended to allow members of Queen's Park to become office bearers of Thirds. The players first used an old drill field on Victoria Road (north of the village of Strathbungo, close to today's Govanhill Park, roughly on the site of Hutcheson's Grammar School's Primary department), to train. The club soon moved a short distance to a new ground, Cathkin Park situated at the junction of Allison Street and Hollybrook Street.

Having joined the newly formed Glasgow Football Association in 1883, the club was a founder member of the Scottish Football League in 1890. By then, Third Lanark had already won the Scottish Cup in 1889, having fallen at the final in 1876 and 1878. The name was changed to Third Lanark AC in 1903, when official links with the military were severed. In the same year, the club moved to the second Hampden Park which had been vacated and deconstructed by Queen's Park who themselves had relocated to a new third Hampden. Third Lanark had to play much of the 1903–04 at this new Hampden while their own ground, renamed New Cathkin Park, was rebuilt for their use. Despite this upheaval, they won their only Scottish League championship in that season, as well as the Scottish Cup again in 1905 (they were losing finalists in 1906). In that pre-World War I period they also claimed the minor Glasgow Merchants Charity Cup in 1890, 1898, and 1900 and the Glasgow Cup in 1903, 1904 and 1909.

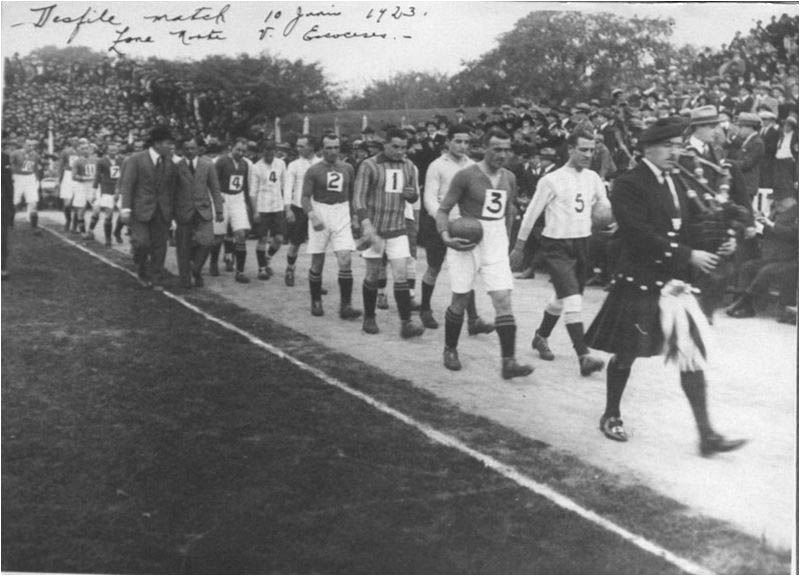
Third Lanark (in dark jerseys) entering the field along with Argentine "Zona Norte" to play a friendly match, June 1923

In 1921, Third Lanark organised a tour of North America inviting several guest players to join them and thus being billed in some press reports and marketing as a 'Scotland XI'. Indeed, only four of the players were actually registered with Third Lanark. During the tour they played 25 matches, winning 24 and drawing the other game. Two years later the club (again with some guest players) made a tour over South America, playing a total of eight friendly matches in Buenos Aires and Montevideo, including a game against the Argentina national side on 24 June. They dropped out of the top division for the first time in 1925 and spent a period as a 'yo-yo club', with three relegations and three promotions in total over the next decade. As well as consolidating in Division One until the interruption of World War II, the club also reached another Scottish Cup Final in 1936, going down 1–0 to Rangers.

After being relegated in 1953, Third Lanark beat Rangers 1–0 to lift the Glasgow Charity Cup in 1954, and captured the same trophy two years later against Partick Thistle, then returned to the top tier in 1957.

After losing to Hearts in the 1959 Scottish League Cup Final, the last day of the 1960–61 season saw the club reach a historic landmark. Third Lanark beat Hibernian 6–1 at Cathkin Park to reach 100 goals for the season, and the win secured third place in Scotland's top division. The following season saw Thirds take part in European competition for the only time when the club faced Rouen of France home and away in the Anglo-Franco-Scottish Friendship Cup (Rouen won 4–0 at Cathkin on 7 November 1961 and 2–1 in France on 9 May 1962). Third Lanark won its final senior trophy, the Glasgow Cup, on 8 April 1963, beating Celtic 2–1 in the final at Hampden Park.

Third Lanark fielded one of the only Scottish Jewish professional footballer players, Sam Latter. Third Lanark had a notable following among the Jewish community in Glasgow, many of whom lived nearby. It was reported by the Jewish Chronicle that as late as 1960, around one-quarter of match-going fans were Jewish. When the club folded, many Jewish supporters of Third Lanark opted to begin supporting Celtic, despite most within the broader Glasgow Jewish community supporting Old Firm rivals Rangers.

=== Decline ===
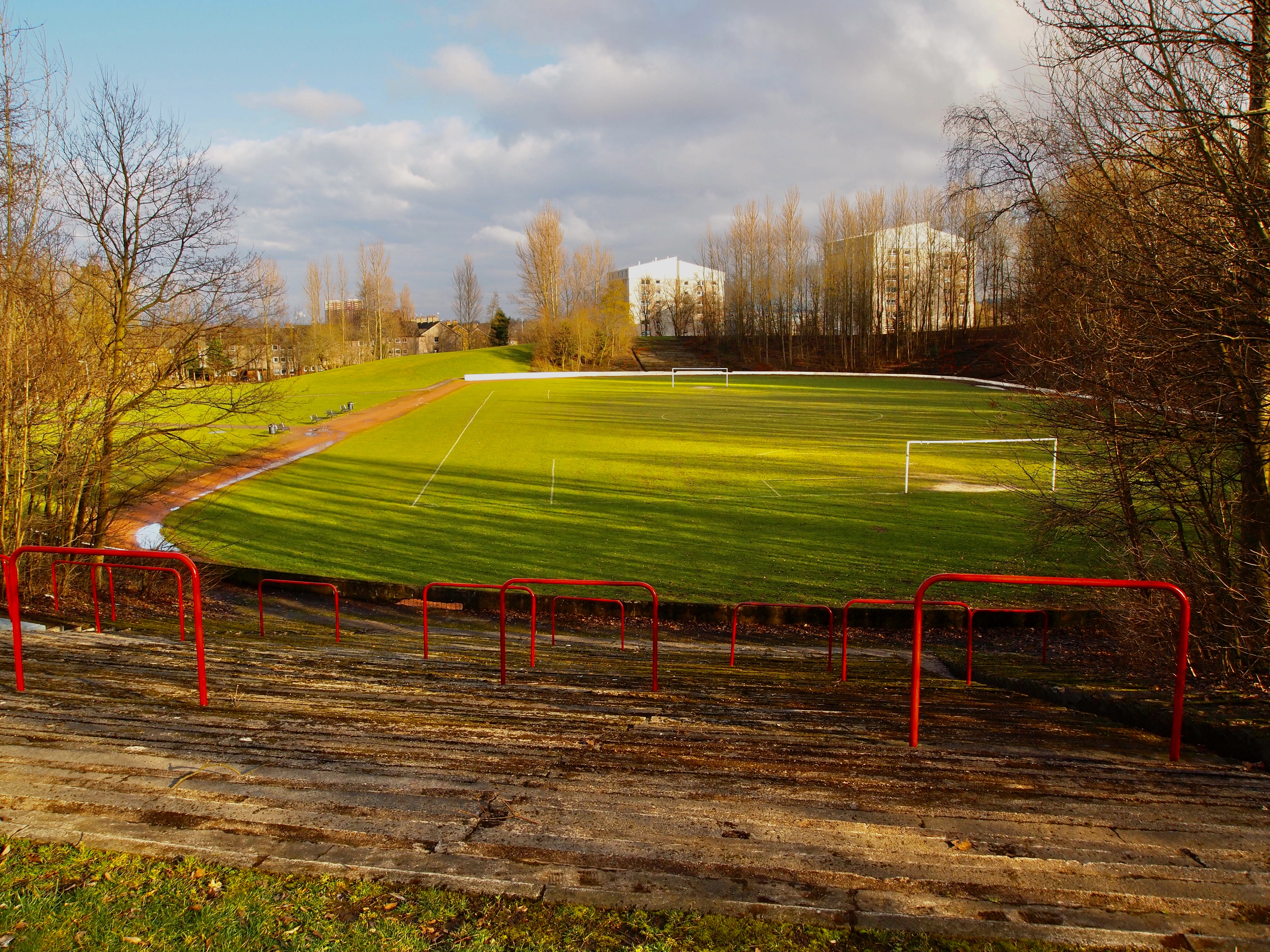
New Cathkin Park as it appeared in 2011

Only four years after that successful 1960–61 season, the club's decline began. The 1965–66 season found Thirds in Division Two, having been relegated as a consequence of the club's most unsuccessful season ever, with only three wins and a single draw from 34 matches in the league in 1964–65 (the final 21 fixtures were all lost).

There followed another two seasons of mediocrity and discontent. On 8 January 1966, the Glasgow Herald announced in a front-page story that the board was investigating the possibility of moving Third Lanark to the new town of East Kilbride and selling Cathkin Park for housing. That season, Third Lanark played 36 league matches, winning 12, drawing 8 and losing the other 16, thus gaining 32 points to finish fourteenth out of nineteen clubs. 55 goals were scored and 65 conceded.

Third Lanark recorded its lowest-ever home League attendance of 297 spectators on Saturday 15 April 1967 (on the same day as the England-Scotland international at Wembley) for the visit of Clydebank. Third Lanark won 1–0 with a goal from forward John Kinnaird; it would be the team's final competitive victory. The last Third Lanark home game against Queen of the South on Tuesday 25 April 1967 ended in a 3–3 draw; Brian McMurdo scored twice for Queens in the second half, including the last goal in senior football at Cathkin Park (the Thirds goals came from John Kinnaird (2) and Hugh McLaughlan; they were 3–1 up at half time). The final attendance at the ground was given as 325 spectators.

The final Thirds game was a humiliating defeat at Boghead Park when hosts Dumbarton won 5–1 on Friday 28 April 1967 in front of 581 spectators (the last Thirds goal was scored by future Airdrie and Hearts star Drew Busby). The line-up in that final game at Boghead was: Bob Russell; Tony Connell and Gerry Heaney; Hugh McLaughlan, Jim Little and Gordon McEwan; Hugh Rundell, Bobby Craig, Drew Busby, Don May and John Kinnaird. The manager was former Rangers captain Bobby Shearer, assisted by former Scotland international John McKenzie as trainer.

This game ended Third Lanark's participation in senior football in Scotland. In the club's final season of existence in Division Two of the Scottish Football League, Third Lanark played 38 League games, winning 34 points out of a possible 76 to finish eleventh out of twenty clubs. They won 13 games, drew 8 and lost the remaining 17; 67 goals were scored and 78 conceded. In the 1960–61 season, home and away, Thirds had attracted 555,489 paying customers to their matches; in the final season of 1966–67, just 55,543 spectators attended their matches.

About a fortnight after the final match at Boghead Park, it was announced that Glasgow Corporation had received an offer from the Third Lanark board to sell it the land at Cathkin for housing. The club's board acknowledged that a lack of funds had made this move inevitable. Around the same time, the board also announced that it was negotiating with an estate company to build a new stadium at Bishopbriggs, to the north of Glasgow. In the end, the stadium was never built.

A subsequent Board of Trade investigation into Third Lanark's affairs - which was published in November 1968 - revealed constant player squabbles and bitter internal struggles for power, as well as the fact that the corruption at Cathkin extended to defrauding the club lottery (which rarely paid out the weekly £200 prize). It was also disclosed that players were paid late and often in coins rather than notes, they had to make their own way to away matches, hot water was not available after matches and every appointment in the club's management was made personally by club chairman Bill Hiddleston. This may have been a disincentive for anyone who was not close to Hiddleston to remain working for, or remain as a shareholder of, the club.

All of these events finally took their toll; on 7 June 1967, Lord Fraser in the Court of Session in Edinburgh issued a winding-up order and appointed an official liquidator. The petition to wind up the club had been brought by a Glasgow building company which claimed that the club owed it more than £2000 for work done on the new stand at Cathkin Park. The judge accepted figures submitted on behalf of the provisional liquidator which showed that the club's liabilities exceeded its liquid assets by £40,000 in preference to those presented by the club and, with no sign of that position changing any time soon, he was left with no alternative but to issue an order to wind up the club.

On 26 June 1967, it was announced that Third Lanark's membership of the Scottish Football League had ceased and that the club's remaining players were up for transfer.

On 1 July 1968, four former directors of Third Lanark were found guilty of contravening the Companies Act 1948 by failing to keep proper books of account during the two years preceding the liquidation of Third Lanark, and fined £100 each. The investigation by the Board of Trade accused club chairman Bill Hiddleston of blatant corruption and found that "the circumstances (merited) police inquiry". Hiddleston had died of a heart attack in Blackpool on 16 November 1967.

The role of chairman Hiddleston in the club's liquidation was, and remains, the subject of debate among those close to Third Lanark. He may have wished to profit personally from the sale of Cathkin Park for property development. Cathkin Park was sold for housing during the 1967 close season, but Glasgow City Council refused planning permission. On the other hand, he built a new grandstand for the club in 1963, an unlikely thing to do if Hiddleston had intended to put the club out of business. Another allegation was that Hiddelston wanted to force the club to move to either Cumbernauld or East Kilbride, the then booming New towns in the Glasgow commuter belt, which at that time had no senior sides of their own.

=== After liquidation ===
After Third Lanark went into liquidation, some Third Lanark fans began supporting other local clubs such as Queen's Park or Clyde, and others began supporting the Old Firm. The nearby Junior club Pollok also received many new fans. Although most other Scottish teams that went into liquidation were later reformed as amateur sides, there was no such resurrection for Third Lanark for many years. It has been suggested that this was because there was such a prolonged period of downfall for Third Lanark that many fans felt too tired of what had gone on at the club to try to bring it back.

A youth team later adopted the name "Third Lanark Athletic" (playing at Rosebank Park), as did a ladies' team. Occasionally exhibition matches were staged at Cathkin with a scratch Third Lanark team. Former Glasgow MP Sir Teddy Taylor bought the company name "Third Lanark Athletic Club Ltd" from the sequestrators in 1967, when there remained the possibility of the club continuing in another form.

=== Rebirth as an amateur side ===
Third Lanark returned to its now dilapidated Cathkin Park home, playing in the Greater Glasgow Amateur League.

On 9 June 2008, a four-man delegation from the club made a surprise announcement to the press, stating that Third Lanark AC would be interested in returning to the Scottish Football League, after SPL team Gretna decided to withdraw from the SFL. The other contenders for the vacant league place were Spartans, Cove Rangers, Annan Athletic, Preston Athletic and Edinburgh City. However, there was no formal application from Third Lanark to enter the SFL, and the club remained in Division 3 of the Greater Glasgow Amateur League. The vacant senior League place finally went to Annan Athletic.

In recent times, there have been moves towards reviving the senior club.

Third Lanark A.F.C. is an amateur team who, as of the 2018–19 season, play in the Central Scottish Amateur Football League. The team previously competed in the West of Scotland AFL and the Greater Glasgow Premier AFL. As of 2018, the team is playing its home games at the Toryglen Regional Football Centre (a modern facility a short distance from Cathkin Park) and at the Barlia Football Centre in Glasgow's Castlemilk district, having played at Fullarton Park (home of Vale of Clyde F.C.), in prior seasons.

== Nickname ==
Third Lanark was known as Thirds, the Warriors, the Redcoats, and the Hi Hi. The last nickname was rumoured to have started during a match in the late 1890s, when a defender kicked the ball so high out of the ground that the crowd started screaming "High High High" and that nickname stayed with the club ever since. The fans invariably started to sing "Hi Hi Hi!" as a battle cry to encourage the team to victory during the club's matches. There was a public house called The Hi Hi Bar at the southern end of Crown Street in the Gorbals area of Glasgow, about one mile from the club's Cathkin Park stadium.

== Ground ==
Third Lanark played at the original Cathkin Park from their foundation until 1903, at which time they took over Queen's Park's Hampden Park ground, renaming it New Cathkin Park, while Queen's Park moved to a new Hampden Park in Mount Florida. New Cathkin Park is currently owned by Glasgow City Council, and large areas of the terracing remain intact on three sides of the ground.

== Ownership and finances ==
Third Lanark was incorporated in 1903. Its initial shareholders were mostly middle-class fans who were wealthy enough to invest in the club. Very few of them were business people or entrepreneurs.

== Managers ==
| Name | Years | Honours |
|---|---|---|
| Jimmy Carabine | 1946–1950 | |
| Alec Ritchie | 1950–1954 | Glasgow Merchants Charity Cup (1951–52, 1953–54) |
| James S. Blair | 1954–1955 | |
| Bill Hiddleston | 1955–1957 | Glasgow Merchants Charity Cup (1955–56) |
| Bob Shankly | 1957–1959 | |
| George Young | 1959–1962 | Scottish League Cup runners-up 1959–60 |
| Willie Steel | 1963–1964 | Glasgow Cup (1962–63) |
| Bobby Evans | 1964–1965 | |
| Bill Hiddleston | 1965–1966 | |
| Frank Joyner | 1966–1967 | |
| Bobby Shearer | January–June 1967 | |

== Honours ==
- Scottish Football League Division One:
  - Winners 1903–04
- Scottish Football League Division Two:
  - Winners 1930–31, 1934–35
- Scottish Cup:
  - Winners 1888–89, 1904–05
  - Runners-up (4) 1875–76, 1877–78, 1905–06, 1935–36
- Scottish League Cup:
  - Runners-up 1959–60
- Glasgow League:
  - Winners 1904–05, 1905–06
- Glasgow Cup:
  - Winners 1903, 1904, 1909, 1963
  - Runners-up (12) 1891, 1906, 1907, 1914, 1924, 1938, 1943, 1947, 1948, 1949, 1954, 1958
- Glasgow Charity Cup:
  - Winners 1890, 1898, 1901, 1952
  - Shared: 1954, 1956
  - Runners-up (8) 1884, 1897, 1910, 1914, 1932, 1939, 1943, 1946

== Other sources ==
- Litster, John (2010). Third Lanark: Life and Death of the Hi Hi. Programme Monthly. ISBN 978-0-95346-823-2.
- McEwan, Michael (2021). The Ghosts of Cathkin Park: The Inside Story of Third Lanark's Demise. Birlinn General. ISBN 978-1-90971-598-1.
