= Glasgow Football Association =

Football governing body in Glasgow, Scotland

Glasgow Football Association

Founded in 1883, the Glasgow Football Association, based in the city of Glasgow, Scotland and affiliated to the national Scottish Football Association, is one of the oldest such bodies in football. In the modern game its influence is limited, the remit being "to represent the interests of the senior football clubs in Glasgow". Those senior clubs competing across the divisions in the Scottish Professional Football League include the two largest and most successful in the country by some distance, Celtic and Rangers (collectively the Old Firm), as well as Partick Thistle, Queen's Park (the oldest football club in Scotland) and Clyde (who have not been based permanently in Glasgow since the 1980s); the three smaller clubs exist in the shadow of their dominant neighbours. A sixth team, Third Lanark, had a strong record until their sudden collapse in the mid 1960s.

The association's most prominent role is the administration of the Glasgow Cup, a tournament for clubs in the city first contested in 1888, which was once a coveted prize but diminished in importance during the 20th century as national and continental football became more popular; from the 1990s it was contested between the member clubs' youth teams, with a 2020 revamp mixing senior teams from the smaller clubs and underage teams from Celtic and Rangers. In addition to the Glasgow Cup, the association aims to "encourage the involvement of local schools and the development of youth football through a variety of other programmes and events". The Glasgow FA looks after the city's senior clubs but not those in lower categories: for example, the West of Scotland Football League contains several Glasgow-based semi-professional clubs (most previously affiliated to the Scottish Junior Football Association, West Region), and the Greater Glasgow Premier AFL is just one of several leagues involving teams from the city under the Scottish Amateur Football Association umbrella.

== History ==
The seven founders of the organisation at a meeting on 6 March 1883 (formed to compete with the older – 1877 – rival Edinburgh Association) included three of the six senior clubs that would carry on membership into the mid 20th century: Rangers, Clyde and Queen's Park, plus Northern, Partick and Pollokshields Athletic. By the end of 1883, thirteen clubs were members: the initial six plus Battlefield, Cowlairs, Luton, Partick Thistle, South-Western, Third Lanark and Thistle. The obvious absentee from the list is Celtic, which was first conceived in 1887 and began playing the following year; in contrast, Clydesdale were one of the leading clubs who had provided players for Scotland in the 1870s but were defunct by the time of the association's founding.

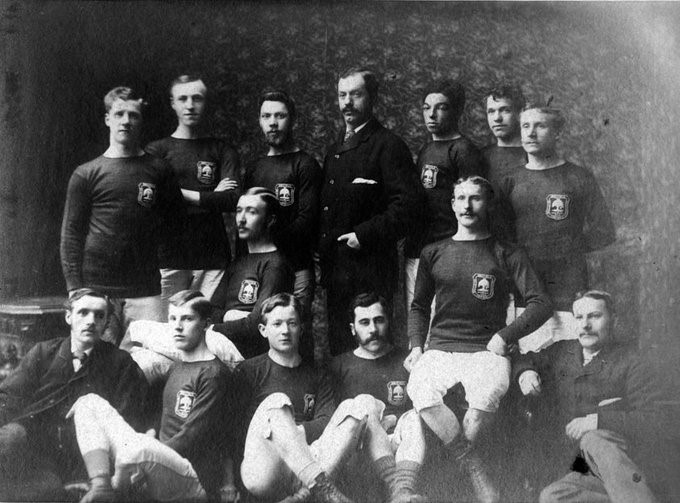
The Glasgow representative team of 1880

Glasgow had a representative team which took part in challenge matches against other associations, most notably a series against the Sheffield Football Association which ran from 1874 to 1960, and played an important role in the early development of football due to the contrasting styles, rules and innovations used in two cities that were home to some of the oldest institutions of the game, such as Queen's Park and Sheffield F.C. respectively. The fixture fell out of favour in the late 1940s with new tournaments such as Scottish and English League Cups taking precedence, but was temporarily revived when floodlights were installed at more grounds to accommodate evening matches.

Other matches were played by Glasgow against the London XI in the 1880s, and against Edinburgh/East of Scotland for charity fundraising, particularly in the 1920s, (a one-off match between them as part of the George VI coronation celebrations in 1937 drew 40,000 spectators to Hampden Park) as well as occasional fixtures such as the last editions of the Glasgow Merchants Charity Cup against English clubs in the mid-1960s, and a one-off match against a Football League XI for the Silver Jubilee of Elizabeth II in 1977.

The Scottish Football Association (SFA) handled the selection for matches that involved Glasgow before 1883, but the Glasgow Association inherited management of the team after its formation.

== Glasgow v Sheffield ==
- 68 matches played;
- Glasgow: 33 wins (168 goals);
- Sheffield: 23 wins (123 goals);
- 12 draws.

=== Match list ===
Glasgow's score is given first in all cases.

#	Date	Venue	Att.	Score	Glasgow goalscorers	Ref.
1	14 March 1874	Bramall Lane (A)	6,000	2–2	Frederick Anderson, Jerry Weir	
2	27 February 1875	Hamilton Crescent (H)	10,000	2–0	D. McLeish, Willie Miller	
3	19 February 1876	Bramall Lane (A)	6,000	2–0	Peter Andrews (2)	
4	10 February 1877	Hampden Park (I) (H)		2–0	John Hunter	
5	9 February 1878	Bramall Lane (A)	10,000	4–2	Moses McNeil (2), Thomas Britten, Peter Campbell	
6	15 February 1879	Hampden Park (I) (H)	10,000	4–1	James Richmond (2), Harry McNeil, George Ker	
7	14 February 1880	Sheaf House (A)	4,000	1–0	Eadie Fraser	
8	12 February 1881	Hampden Park (I) (H)	5,000	3–0	J. Erskine, Eadie Fraser, George Ker	
9	11 February 1882	Bramall Lane (A)	12,000	1–3	A. Wylie	
10	17 February 1883	Hampden Park (I) (H)		4–2	John Kay (2), Woodville Gray, William Harrower	
11	16 February 1884	Bramall Lane (A)		2–1	John Smith, Alec Hamilton	
12	14 February 1885	Hampden Park (II) (H)		9–1	Willie Turner (4), William Harrower (2), Davie Allan (2), Bob Christie	
13	23 January 1886	Bramall Lane (A)	2,000	2–2	D. McIntyre, William Tait	
14	5 February 1887	Hampden Park (II) (H)	2,000	10–3	William Sellar (3), James Allan (3), John Marshall (2), John Lambie, Own goal	
15	28 January 1888	Bramall Lane (A)	7,000	3–2	Billy Johnstone (2), Tom Robertson	
16	19 January 1889	Hampden Park (II) (H)	5,000	8–1	Jimmy Oswald, John Buchanan (2), J. Britton, John Marshall (2), Willie Berry, James McLaren	
17	11 January 1890	Bramall Lane (A)	5,000	3–1	Jimmy Hamilton, Thomas Wyllie (2)	
18	10 January 1891	Bramall Lane (A)	10,000	3–4	Jake Madden, Alan Maxwell, John McPherson	
19	9 January 1892	Hampden Park (II) (H)	4,000	4–2	William Sellar (2), Sandy McMahon, John Harvey	
20	12 November 1892	Bramall Lane (A)	3,000	3–3	John Allan (2), scrimmage	
21	11 November 1893	Olive Grove	5,000	2–7	Hugh McCreadie, Willie Paul	
22	7 December 1895	Cathkin Park (I) (H)	3,000	3–1	William Lambie, John Proudfoot, Willie Paul	
23	7 November 1896	Bramall Lane (A)	2,000	1–5	James Allison	
24	6 November 1897	Cathkin Park (I) (H)	9,000	0–0	none	
25	10 December 1898	Bramall Lane (A)	5,000	1–2	Alec Crawford	
26	4 November 1899	Hampden Park (II) (H)	6,000	4–0	Thomas Bowie, Robert McColl (2), William Stewart	
27	29 October 1900	Bramall Lane (A)	4,000	1–3	John McPherson	
28	11 September 1901	Shawfield (H)	4,000	1–1	Hughie Wilson	
29	27 October 1902	Hillsborough (A)	5,000	2–0	Finlay Speedie, Johnny Campbell	
30	9 September 1903	Ibrox (H)	3,000	3–0	Robert Hamilton, Hughie Wilson, Jimmy Quinn	
31	24 October 1904	Bramall Lane (A)	6,000	0–2	none	
32	25 April 1906	Meadowside (H)		1–0	Archie Kyle	
33	15 October 1906	Hillsborough (A)	6,000	2–3	Jimmy McMenemy, Archie Kyle	
34	18 March 1908	Meadowside (H)	5,000	2–2	Archie Kyle, Jimmy Speirs	
35	19 October 1908	Bramall Lane (A)	6,000	0–2	none	
36	20 October 1909	Firhill (H)	5,000	0–1	none	
37	15 October 1910	Hillsborough (A)	3,000	2–2	Alec Bennett, James Bowie	
38	16 October 1911	Cathkin Park	6,000	1–2	Willie Reid	
39	21 October 1912	Bramall Lane (A)	7,000	1–1	Andy McAtee	
40	13 September 1913	Ibrox (H)	8,000	3–0	Willie Reid, Jimmy Galt, Patsy Gallacher	
41	26 October 1914	Hillsborough (A)	6,000	1–2	Willie Reid	
42	14 September 1920	Firhill (H)	7,000	4–1	Andy Fyfe (3), Adam McLean	
43	12 September 1921	Bramall Lane (A)	25,000	1–1	Jimmy Kinloch	
44	19 September 1922	Firhill (H)	6,000	5–0	Adam McLean, Jimmy Kinloch, James McAlpine, Harry Rae, Alec Reid	
45	10 September 1923	Hillsborough (A)	10,000	2–1	Jimmy Kinloch, Tommy McInally	
46	9 September 1924	Hampden Park (H)	14,000	5–0	Tommy McInally (3), Robert Gillespie, Patsy Gallacher	
47	14 September 1925	Bramall Lane (A)	18,000	1–1	Bobby McKay	
48	21 September 1926	Firhill (H)	6,000	2–1	Bill Johnstone (2)	
49	19 September 1927	Hillsborough (A)	12,000	1–4	Jimmy Simpson	
50	18 September 1928	Hampden Park (H)	13,000	5–1	Stewart Chalmers (2), Davie Ness, James McAlpine, Jimmy Fleming	[64]
51	16 September 1929	Bramall Lane (A)		0–2	none	
52	22 September 1930	Hampden Park (H)	8,000	4–1	John Simpson (2), George Brown, James Crawford	
53	14 September 1931	Hillsborough (A)	10,000	2–7	Jim Murray, John Torbet	
54	2 November 1932	Ibrox (H)	6,000	4–1	Own goal, Neil Dewar (3)	
55	23 October 1933	Bramall Lane (A)		4–3	Billy Boyd, Johnny McKenzie (2), Hugh O'Donnell	
56	7 November 1934	Firhill (H)	8,000	2–4	James Crawford, Alex Venters	
57	23 September 1935	Hillsborough (A)		1–3	George Hay	
58	4 November 1936	Hampden Park (H)	7,800	1–2	Alex McSpadyen	
59	20 September 1937	Belle Vue (Doncaster) (A)	7,971	2–1	Edwin Watson (2)	
60	19 September 1938	Ibrox (H)	2,000	1–5	Tom Robertson	
61	24 October 1949	Bramall Lane (A)	22,500	2–4	Jimmy Walker (2)	
62	10 November 1954	Shawfield (H)	20,000	4–5	Bert Cromar, Tommy Ring, Charlie Tully, Jimmy Ward	
63	16 November 1955	Hillsborough (A)	23,032	2–3	Bert McCann, Bobby Collins	
64	14 November 1956	Shawfield (H)	13,000	2–2	Tommy Ring, Bobby Craig	
65	20 November 1957	Bramall Lane (A)	10,986	0–3	none	
66	19 November 1958	Firhill (H)	22,000	4–0	Ian McMillan, Davie McParland, John Coyle, Matt Gray	
67	11 November 1959	Hillsborough (A)		1–1	Matt Gray	
68	16 November 1960	Celtic Park (H)	7,000	5–0	Matt Gray, Davie McParland, George Smith (2), Alex Harley	

== Glasgow v London ==
- 8 matches played;
- Glasgow: 5 wins (27 goals);
- London: 2 wins (15 goals);
- 1 draw.

=== Match list ===
Glasgow's score is given first in all cases.

#	Date	Venue	Att.	Score	Glasgow goalscorers	Ref.
1	20 January 1883	Hampden Park (I) (H)	5,000	4–0	John Kay, Frank Shaw, William Harrower, W. Pringle	
2	15 December 1883	Kennington Oval (A)	3,500	2–3	Woodville Gray (2)	
3	20 December 1884	Hampden Park (II) (H)	5,000	6–2	William Anderson (2), William Sellar, John Marshall, William Harrower, Charles Campbell	
4	5 December 1885	Kennington Oval (A)	2,000	5–2	William Sellar (2), G. Miller (2), J. Brown	
5	27 November 1886	Hampden Park (II) (H)	4,000	2–2	Charles Heggie, John Marshall	
6	3 March 1888	Kennington Oval (A)		0–3	none	
7	23 March 1889	Hampden Park (II) (H)	2,000	5–1	John McPherson, James McPherson, George Hector (2), Willie Paul	
8	25 January 1890	Kennington Oval (A)		3–2	Billy Johnstone, Willie Paul, Thomas Wyllie	
