= Donald McLean (footballer) =

Scottish footballer (1934–2022)

Donny McLean
Personal information
- Full name: Donald Hunter McLean
- Date of birth: 22 December 1934
- Place of birth: Rutherglen, Scotland
- Date of death: 1 May 2022 (aged 87)
- Place of death: Camberley, Surrey, England
- Position: Wing half

Youth career
- 1951–1955: Queen's Park

Senior career*
Years	Team	Apps	(Gls)
1953–1960	Queen's Park	95	(7)

International career
1956	Scotland Amateurs	8	(0)
- * Club domestic league appearances and goals

Donald Hunter McLean (22 December 1934 – 1 May 2002) was a Scottish amateur football who played in the Scottish League as a wing half back for Queen's Park.

== Career ==
McLean was playing football before he can remember, but as a five-year-old in 1940 he recalled that the local lads would play before, during and after school in the streets of Rutherglen with newspaper-filled balls.

Organised football had a religious twist for Donald who as a 10-year-old joined the newly formed Sunday School team coached by Douglas who was also the Sunday School teacher. Of this period, Donny remarked, "Douglas let us play. That was the main thing." The uniforms were bought with a combination of clothing coupons and raised money, as rationing was still in effect.

He attended Farie Street Primary where as an 11-year-old he found his form as a midfielder and developed the style that would mark his career; making goals for others.

The local academy, Rutherglen, which had a strong football team, were impressed by his abilities and he was asked for a try out when he was of age. He passed the entrance exams and made the team.

The highlights of his stay at the Rutherglen Academy: playing for the Senior team as a 15-year-old in the Scottish Schoolboy Tournament, playing against Bradford at Hampden Park, Scotland's national stadium in front of between 7000–8000 fans and playing at Ibrox, home of Rangers, against a team of players selected from the rest of Scotland. One of his classmates was Niall Hopper, who also joined Queen's Park and went on to enjoy a long career with the club.

After his school days he was chosen to play for the Scottish under-21 team.

His career with Queen's Park began at the age of 17. Here he played with the entry level Victoria 11, before being called up to the Hampden 11 (where he played alongside one of his idols, David Letham, who was approaching retirement) and by the time he went to do National Service at the age of 18 he had been through the Stroller 11 and had made the top team: Queen's Park First 11.

In the National service McLean was stationed in the small village of Lendl in the province of Carinthia, Austria. Much of his time was spent playing football. He played for two teams, a local Austrian team consisting of displaced persons, locals and a couple of British, and the Army team of Klagenfurt. The calibre of play was high so when he returned to Glasgow in 1955 he hadn't lost a step and was placed with Queen's Park Stroller 11.

He played his first game for the First 11 in the 1955–56 season, winning the second tier), and the next season he saw action in the top division, with that and the following campaign being the last time the Spiders attained these lofty heights.

McLean once played in front of 60,000 people and regularly played for crowds of 25,000–30,000. He featured in the 1957 final of the Glasgow Merchants Charity Cup (a minor trophy played between local clubs); the match at Ibrox was won 2–1 by Rangers. His time with the club coincided with some of its best-loved players, such as Hastie, Cromar and Hopper, while in the latter part of his spell he shared teams with a young Alex Ferguson.

He was capped by Scotland at the amateur level for playing against Holland, Switzerland and Germany.

McLean retired from football in 1960.

== Death ==
McLean died in Camberley, Surrey on 1 May 2022, at the age of 87.
