= Jessiman =

Jessiman is a surname. Notable people with the surname include:

- Duncan Jessiman (1923–2006), Canadian lawyer
- George Jessiman (1900–1986), Scottish footballer
- Hugh Jessiman (born 1984), American ice hockey player
- James Jessiman, Scottish footballer
- Jim Jessiman (1912–1989), Canadian politician
- Ryan Jessiman (born 1983) London tattoo artist
