= Omand =

Omand is a surname. Notable people with the surname include:

- David Omand (born 1947), British senior civil servant
- Willie Omand or Junior Omand, (1931–2005), Scottish footballer
- John Omand (1823–1905), the namesake of Omand's Creek
