= Andrew Watson (footballer, born 1856) =

Scottish footballer (1856–1921)

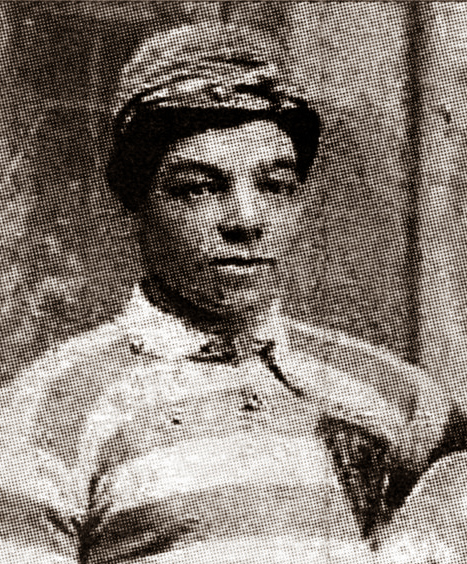
- Watson in 1882

Personal information
- Date of birth: 24 May 1856
- Place of birth: Demerara, British Guiana
- Date of death: 8 March 1921 (aged 64)
- Place of death: London, England
- Position: Full back

Senior career*
Years	Team	Apps	(Gls)
1874	Maxwell		
1874–1880	Parkgrove		
1880–1882	Queen's Park	0	(0)
1882–1884	Swifts		
1884–1885	Corinthians		
1885–1887	Queen's Park	0	(0)
1887–1892	Bootle		

International career
1881–1882	Scotland	3	(0)
- * Club domestic league appearances and goals

Andrew Watson (24 May 1856 – 8 March 1921) was a Scottish footballer who is widely considered to be the first black person to play association football at international level. He played three matches for Scotland between 1881 and 1882. Arthur Wharton was previously commonly thought to be the first black player, as he was the first black professional footballer to play in the Football League, but Watson's career predated him by over a decade. There is evidence that Watson was paid professionally when at Bootle in 1887, two years prior to Wharton becoming a professional with Rotherham Town; however, the Merseyside club did not play in the Football League at the time Watson played there.

== Early life and education ==
Watson was the son of a wealthy Scottish sugar planter Peter Miller Watson (1805–1869) (the son of James Watson, of Crantit, Orkney, Scotland) and a local British Guianese woman named Hannah Rose. He came to Britain with his father, and his older sister Annetta, and they inherited a substantial amount when their father died in London in 1869.

He was educated at Heath Grammar School in Halifax, West Yorkshire and then from 1871 at King's College School, in Wimbledon, London, where records show he excelled at sports including football. He later studied natural philosophy, mathematics and engineering at the University of Glasgow when he was 19, where his love of football blossomed. He played in the full-back position, on either the right or the left flank.

== Early life, marriages, children ==
Watson left Glasgow University after one year, and in 1877, became a partner in Watson, Miller, and Baird, a wholesale warehouse business in Glasgow. In November 1877, he married Jessie Nimmo Armour (1860–1882), the daughter of John Armour, a cabinet-maker. Their son Rupert Andrew was born in 1878, and a daughter Agnes Maude in 1880. Watson moved to London with his family in the summer of 1882 for work reasons. His wife died in the autumn of 1882 and their two children returned to Glasgow to live with their grandparents.

He returned to Glasgow and married for a second time, to Eliza Kate Tyler (1861–1949) in February 1887. She was the daughter of Joseph Tyler, East India merchant. Later that year, he moved to Liverpool, where he worked on ships and sat exams to qualify as a marine engineer. Watson and Eliza had two children, a son Henry Tyler in 1888 and a daughter Phyllis Kate in 1891.

Through his father, he was related to William Ewart Gladstone, who served four terms as British Prime Minister during the late 19th century, and likely also related to the 21st-century English poet Malik Al Nasir through his mother.

== Football career ==
=== Club career ===
After first playing for Maxwell in 1876, Watson signed for local side Parkgrove, where he was additionally their match secretary, making him the first black administrator in football. At Parkgrove he played alongside another black player, Robert Walker.

Watson also took part in athletics competitions, winning the high jump on several occasions.

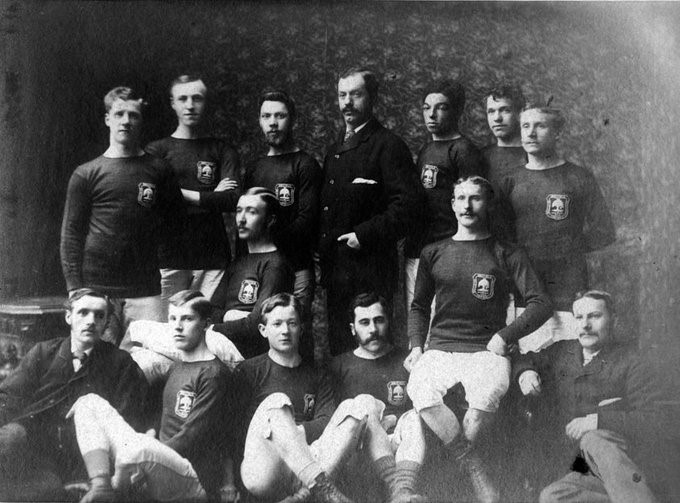
Andrew Watson, back row, third from right with the Glasgow Select Team in 1880

On 14 February 1880, Watson was selected to represent Glasgow against Sheffield at Bramall Lane, an annual fixture played between 1874 and 1960; Glasgow won 1–0. He was also selected for a tour to Canada in the summer of 1880 which was cancelled after the death of William Dick, secretary of the Scottish Football Association.

In April 1880, Watson also signed for Queen's Park – then Britain's largest football team – and became their secretary in November 1881. He led the team to two consecutive Scottish Cup wins in 1881 and 1882, thus becoming the first black player to win a major competition.

Watson's entry in the Scottish Football Association Annual of 1880–81 reads as follows:

Watson, Andrew: One of the very best backs we have; since joining Queen's Park has made rapid strides to the front as a player; has great speed and tackles splendidly; powerful and sure kick; well worthy of a place in any representative team.

In 1882, Watson moved to London and became the first black player to play in the English Cup when he turned out for Swifts. In 1883, he was the first foreign player to be invited to join the leading amateur club in England, the Corinthians. His time there included an 8–1 victory against Blackburn Rovers, who were at that time the English Cup holders. He also played for other amateur English clubs, including Pilgrims, Brentwood, and London Caledonians. As one of the 'Scotch Professors' of the age who introduced a more sophisticated and effective passing game into England where individualistic dribbling had previously been used, Watson was described by the founder of the Scottish Football Museum in a 2021 report as "the most influential black footballer of all time. There is nobody that comes close".

The colour of his skin was of no significance to his peers, and there is no specific historical record of racism on the part of the Scottish Football Association, although in an 1885 profile, mention was made of him "On more than one occasion being subjected to vulgar insults by splenetic, ill-tempered players". One match report is more interested in Watson's unusual brown boots rather than the customary black boots of that time. As written in the minutes, before one match where Watson was injured and unable to play, an SFA vice-president said if Watson had been fit he would have happily drugged a fellow Scottish international to give Watson his place. He played his last match for Queen's Park in 1886.

Paul McDonald, writing for the BBC, noted: "Payments to players had been made legal in England in 1885 and professional footballers were paid decent salaries for that time. Ironically, this attracted many Scottish players southwards to ply their trade in England, whereas in Scotland the game remained, in theory anyway, an amateur game until 1893."

==== Professionalism ====
In 1886 and 1887, the English club Bootle advertised for players in Scotland, as the Scotch Professors innovation of the modern passing game took hold in England. Several Scottish players were enticed to relocate by the offer:- Tom Veitch (Dumbarton), Campbell (Moffat), Frank Woods (Moffat), Robert Anderson (Dumbarton), Billy Hastings (Airdrieonians) among others. It was later found by a SFA committee investigating a Scottish player, Robert Calderwood, who returned north - he obtained a new job in Cowlairs offering 30 shillings per week, and subsequently turned out for Cowlairs F.C. - that he received a wage of 26 shillings per week from Bootle F.C.. The SFA found Calderwood guilty of professionalism and he was banned for two years, but they found that Cowlairs F.C. played the player unknowingly and they were merely ordered to replay a match against Third Lanark.

Watson also signed for Merseyside club Bootle in 1887. Bootle offered wages and signing fees to a number of players, and research by Tony Onslow outlined in The Forgotten Rivals. A History of Bootle Football Club indicates that Watson was paid professionally. This means that Watson's professional career would predate the professional career of Arthur Wharton, who was previously considered to be the first black footballer to play professionally.

Onslow writes that Watson was Bootle's star signing and that the club pulled off the biggest coup in Merseyside by signing the Scotland international player. It is not known exactly how much Watson was paid by the Merseyside club, but as their star signing he would have doubtless commanded more than the 26 shillings per week offered to Calderwood, who was similarly a Scotland international player.

When Bootle was drawn with a Smethwick side Great Bridge Unity F.C., the Midlands club received a telegram from a 'Smith of Oakfield' who stated that Bootle's Watson and another Scottish player Robert Anderson were being paid – and as such should be ineligible for their tie. Watson and others were in the Bootle side that beat Unity 2–1; and so, directly after the match, Unity lodged a complaint with the F.A. The F.A. announced that they would let Bootle proceed to the next round, but they would instead launch an investigation into the club.

Onslow writes:

Bootle Football Club now faced a local FA committee on charge of paying a certain number of their players. Dr. Morley of Blackburn, President of the northern branch, chaired the meeting that took place at the Crompton Hotel in Liverpool. Also present was Morton P. Betts from the London executive and all the prominent members of the Liverpool and District F.A. committee. Former Bootle players [Robert] Izatt and [John] Weir were called to give evidence before the commitee [sic?] adjourned and referred the matter to London.

Both Robert Izatt and John Weir were Scottish players (formerly from Third Lanark) also signed by Bootle. Weir was a Scotland international, having just been capped that year. Much to the annoyance of Bootle, both players moved on from the club shortly after signing and moved on to Everton, who at the time were Bootle's main rivals in Merseyside.

The club was found guilty by the FA but the punishment was lenient – they had that same season closed Anfield for a month when Everton similarly paid players – and Bootle escaped with a mere caution. The new Everton players John Weir and Robert Izatt - alongside Everton's other Scotch Professors of Dick, Watson, Goudie, Cassidy, and Murray - were all deemed as professional players and had their registrations suspended.

The payment of Watson, Anderson, Calderwood and others at the club also explains the investigations of the local Bootle newspaper into the club's finances. Around the start of the 1887–88 season, The Bootle Times was asking questions into the club's finances, trying to work out who was getting what. It also, in passing, takes a dig at Bootle F.C.'s reliance on Scottish players by its phrasing of 'own local club, if indeed we may call it that', hinting that the newspaper suspected the payments made to the club's Scottish players were indeed where the club's financial surplus went. The payments to Scotch Professors around Merseyside would have been common knowledge.

The Saturday 1 October 1887 edition noted:

QUESTIONS WHICH REQUIRE ANSWERS. In Bootle and other places the football season has commenced in right earnest. Our own local club, if indeed we may call it that, has started has well; 9 games have already played which have proved to be of the most interesting character to those who taken interest in such pastimes. [...] First and foremost comes the "profit and loss account" of the club in question, and this is a very interesting item. Saturday after Saturday the ground is simply crowded with spectators, all of whom, with the exception of the subscribers, pay 3d. gate money. Last Saturday week, taking the figure from a Liverpool contemporary, we find that upwards of 5,000 persons on the field, and last Saturday there must have at least 4,000. Bring them together and we have 9,000 people upon the football field in two weeks. Nine thousand people at 3d. per head, would bring a gate of over £112. £112 to be raised in a fortnight by one club is no small sum, and it augurs well for the popularity of the game in Bootle, and the result of this season's play. [...] If, for the sake of argument, we place the length of the football season at eight months, and consider that the "gates" will average 1,000 persons each week, we shall thus conclude that at least £800 - £1000 will be taken in one year. Of course this money is not all clear profit. From it has to be deducted travelling and various other expenses incidental to a club of the standing of the Bootle Football Club; but we venture to assert that after all claims have been met a large surplus must remain. What, then, we require to know, is Where does this surplus go? If it were possible to obtain a balance sheet of the club, it would not be necessary to ask these questions. We have applied for a balance sheet upon more than one occasion, but the request has been met by one excuse or another, to the effect that no balance sheet was printed.

The 15 October 1887 edition of The Bootle Times notes: "the questions asked of us a fortnight ago with reference to the working and management of the club have not been answered."

=== International career ===
Watson won three international caps for Scotland. His first cap came against England in London on 12 March 1881, in which he captained the side. Scotland won 6–1, which (as of 2024) is still a record home defeat for England. A few days later, Scotland played Wales and won 5–1, Watson captaining Scotland again.

Watson's last cap came against England in Glasgow on 11 March 1882. This was a 5–1 victory again to Scotland. Watson moved to London in the summer of 1882, which effectively ended his international career as the SFA only picked players based in Scotland at this time.

The next non-white person to receive a full international cap for Scotland was Paul Wilson in 1975. The next black person selected to play for Scotland after Andrew Watson was Nigel Quashie in 2004, 123 years later. He also became the first non-white player to score for the Scotland senior team (Scotland 4x1 Trinidad & Tobago).

== Later life and tributes ==
Watson retired to London in around 1910 and died of pneumonia at 88 Forest Road, Kew, in 1921. He is buried in Richmond Cemetery.

In 1926, the sportswriter "Tityrus" (the pseudonym of J. A. H. Catton, editor of the Athletic News) named Andrew Watson as left-back in his all-time Scotland team. A mural of Watson was painted on the side of a cafe in Shawlands, south Glasgow in 2020, and he also features prominently in the First Hampden Mural at Hampden Bowling Club.

In 2025, a plaque honouring Watson was revealed outside of The Crossley Heath School, the amalgamation of Heath Grammar School, his former high school, and Crossley and Porter School. This plaque was unveiled by Viv Anderson, who was the first black player for the England national football team.

== Honours ==
Queen's Park

- Scottish Cup: 1880–81, 1881–82, 1885–86
- Glasgow Merchants Charity Cup: 1879–80, 1880–81, 1883–84

== See also ==
- Willie Clarke (footballer), the first black player to score in the English Football League, he played for Scotland at a junior level.
- List of Scotland international footballers born outside Scotland
- List of Scotland national football team captains
- James Robertson (rugby union, born 1854) – the first black person to play rugby union. Robertson played for Royal HSFP and represented Edinburgh District in the 1870s.
- Robert Walker (Third Lanarkshire Rifle Volunteers footballer), another black player to play association football alongside Watson at Parkgrove.
