= Apsley F.C. (Scotland) =

Defunct association football club in Scotland

Apsley
- Full name: Apsley Football Club
- Founded: 1876
- Dissolved: 1883
- Ground: Bellevue Park
- Hon. Secretary: George Baillie
Winton colours	Apsley colours

Apsley Football Club was a 19th-century association football club from Mount Florida, in Glasgow.

== History ==
The club was founded in 1876 under the name Winton, the first recorded match for the club being against the 10th D.R.V. in April that year. It was admitted to the Scottish Football Association in time to enter the 1877–78 Scottish Cup, but, despite having 45 members, the club scratched when drawn to face Parkgrove. The club was thereupon briefly taken over by Rovers, but the merged club did not survive the season.

In 1879, the club re-formed as Apsley, after the buildings close to the ground (and in which the club's honorary secretary lived). Apsley played mostly low-key matches, until the club decided to enter the 1882–83 Scottish Cup. Drawn at Cowlairs in the second round, after gaining a bye in the first round, the club attacked from the kick-off, but conceded a breakaway goal; the score was 3–0 after 10 minutes, 7–0 at half-time, and 13–0 at the end.

The club continued playing afterwards, one notable result a 5–4 victory at a young Stenhousemuir club a fortnight after the Cup defeat, but the club did not survive the season.

== Colours ==
The club's colours were originally navy jerseys, white knickerbockers, and blue and white hose. By 1882 it was wearing red and white 1 inch hooped jerseys and stockings, with blue knickerbockers.

== Ground ==
The club played at private grounds at Bellevue Park in Mount Florida, ten minutes' walk from Crosshill terminus.

== Notable players ==
- Walter Lamont, who earned a Scotland cap in 1885
