= Albert Gray =

Albert Gray or Grey may refer to:

- Albert L. Gray (1847–1916), Canadian-born American dry goods merchant and Wisconsin Assemblyman
- Bert Gray (1900–1969), Welsh international footballer
- Albert Grey, 4th Earl Grey (1851–1917), British nobleman and politician who served as Governor General of Canada
- Albert Alexander Gray (1868–1936), British physician and otologist
