= Donald Sillars =

Scottish footballer

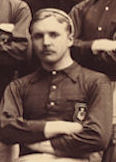
Sillars in Scotland kit, 1892

Donald Currie Sillars (30 October 1868 – 25 September 1905) was a Scottish footballer, who played as a half-back or (in emergencies) right back for Battlefield, Pollokshields Athletic, Queen's Park, Rangers and Scotland. Sillars was also a captain in the Glasgow Highlanders.

Sillars died after being found injured on the Paisley and Barrhead Railway Line.

== See also ==
- List of Scotland national football team captains
