= Stonelaw High School =

Coordinates: 55°49′16″N 4°11′47″W

Location
- 140 Calderwood Road; Rutherglen, South Lanarkshire, G73 3BP; Scotland

Information
- Type: Secondary School
- Established: 1970
- Local authority: South Lanarkshire
- Head Teacher: Brenda McLachlan
- Staff: 90 FTE
- Gender: Co-educational
- Age: 11 to 18
- Enrolment: 1353
- Houses: Arran; Bain; Bute; Skye
- Colours: Red, Black, dark blue
- Website: www.stonelaw.s-lanark.sch.uk

Stonelaw High School is a non-denominational state high school located in Rutherglen, Scotland, near the city of Glasgow. It is one of 17 Secondary Schools throughout South Lanarkshire Council. The school offers a wide range of educational experiences for S1 – S6, from traditional subjects to more vocational subjects, as well as an extensive range of extra-curricular activities, school trips and visits.

== Admissions ==
The headteacher is Brenda McLachlan. The current school roll is around 1350 pupils and there are 90 FTE teachers.

The school's catchment area includes Rutherglen, areas of Cambuslang, and Halfway. Stonelaw High School has seven feeder primary schools: Bankhead Primary, Burgh Primary, Burnside Primary, Calderwood Primary, James Aiton Primary, Park View Primary, and Spittal Primary.

The current school building was completed in summer 1998 on Calderwood Road, Rutherglen. The school uses a traditional house system, with pupils being organised into one of three houses: Arran, Bute, and Skye.

Stonelaw was awarded 'sports hub' status on 5 November 2013 by MSP Shona Robison Minister for Commonwealth Games and Sport. Outwith learning hours, the sports facilities are available for hire by the local community in partnership with South Lanarkshire Council, with several local clubs based there.

Stonelaw High was rated "excellent" and highlighted as "sector leading" by Education Scotland inspectors in the school's recent inspection report in 2023.

== History ==
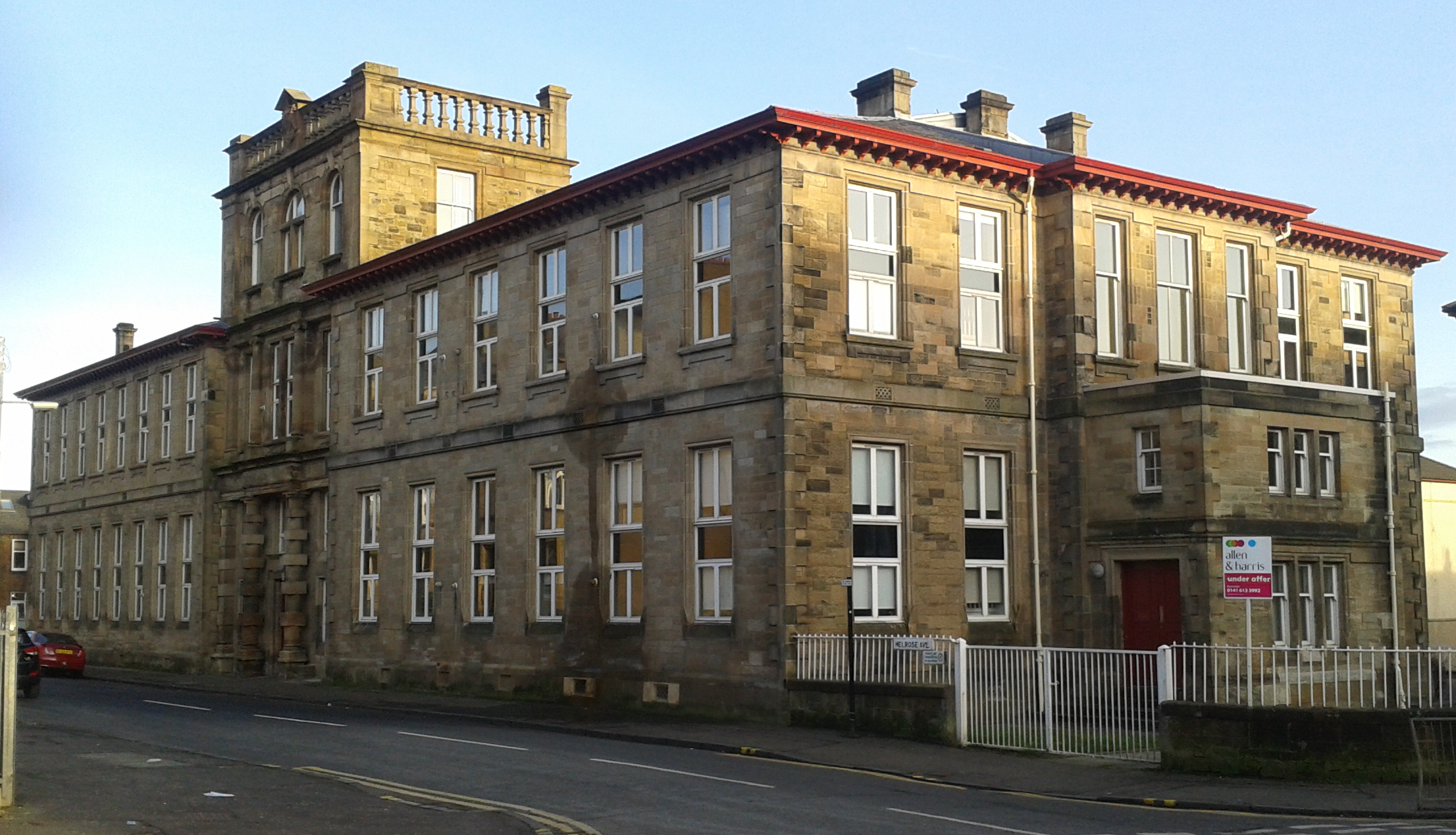
The original Stonelaw Public School / Rutherglen Academy building

Stonelaw Public School on Melrose Avenue was built in 1886. It became Rutherglen Academy in 1926. A separate institution, Gallowflat Public School (named after the mansion house which stood nearby from the 1760s to the 1910s) was based on Hamilton Road from 1909.

=== Grammar school ===
Prior to 1970, a selective secondary education system existed in Scotland that involved two grades of secondary schools: Senior Secondaries and Junior Secondaries. At the heart of this selective system was an exam called the 11-Plus taken by all children in the last year of primary school. Those who passed the 11-Plus went to one of the Senior Secondaries (six-year schools) while all others attended one of the Junior Secondaries (four-year schools). Senior Secondary pupils were expected to stay on at school until aged eighteen and proceed to some sort of tertiary education at university or college, whereas Junior Secondary pupils had to leave school aged fifteen for jobs and/or apprenticeships. Before 1972, fifteen was the minimum school leaving age in Scotland. The mid-19th century Macdonald School building in the heart of Rutherglen was used as an annex for the academy, which required the pupils to walk approximately 400 yards between the sites.

=== Comprehensive ===
Stonelaw High School was established in August 1970 as a four-year school, merging some of the pupils already at Rutherglen Academy with pupils from Gallowflat Junior Secondary. Other Academy pupils who had been at primary schools in Cambuslang, Carmunnock and Burnside largely went up to the new (1970) Cathkin High School. Initially, Stonelaw pupils wishing to do Highers or Certificates of Sixth-Year Studies (CSYS) – these being pre-university qualifications – transferred to Cathkin High for their last two years but eventually Stonelaw High became a six-year school.

The new Stonelaw school was based in the former Academy buildings at the corner of Stonelaw Road and Melrose Avenue along with an 'annex' – the Gallowflat buildings on Hamilton Road. As with the arrangements for the Macdonald building (which closed for this purpose when Stonelaw High opened), the two-site setup again involved hundreds of pupils walking between departments via several residential streets several times a day, which continued for the next 28 years.

=== Relocation ===
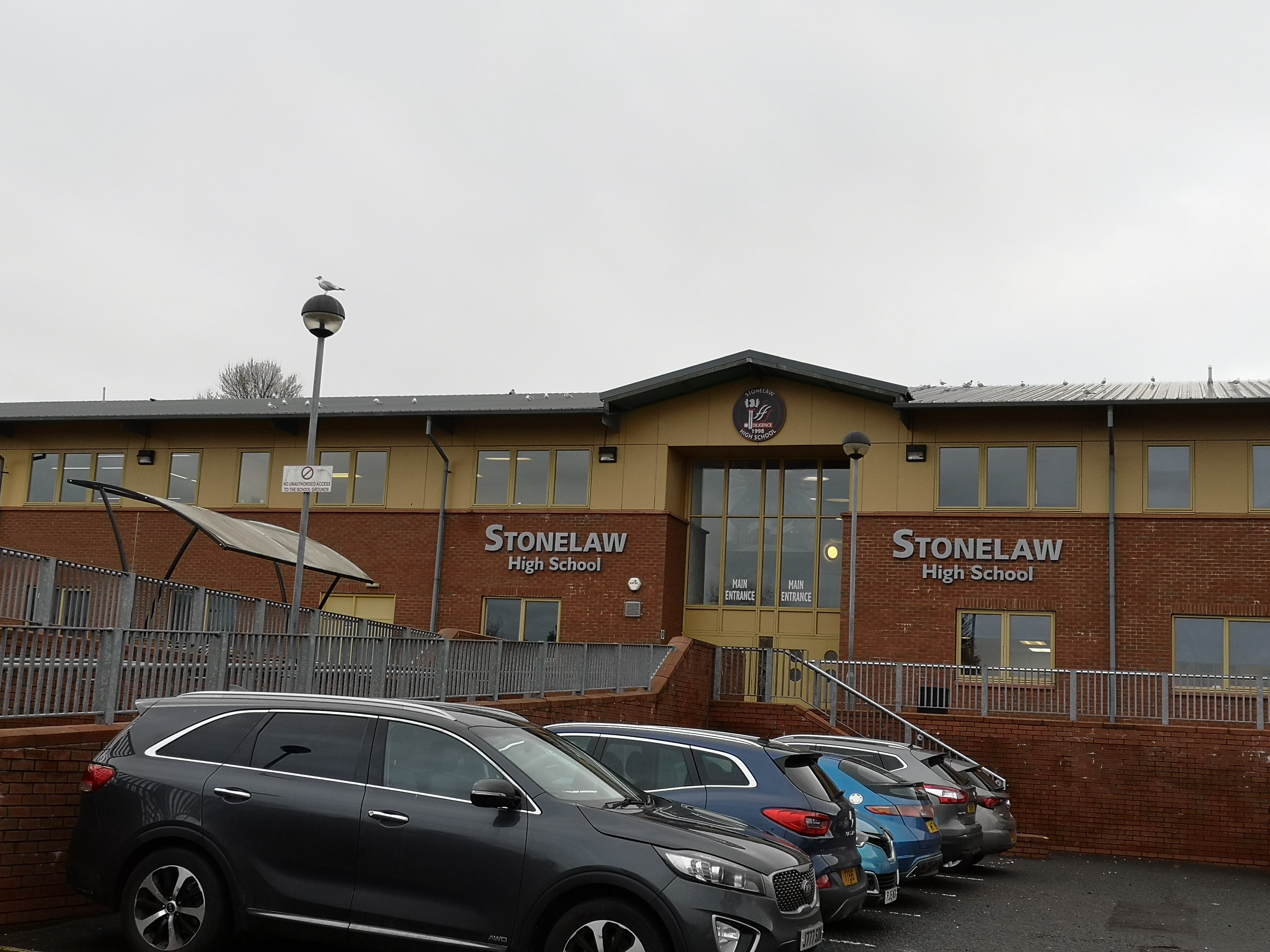
Main entrance to the new buildings (2019)

The school relocated to new premises on Calderwood Road, Rutherglen in summer 1998, on land which had once been part of a farm. The playing fields, adjacent to the new site but finished in 1996 prior to the construction of the buildings, were previously the recreation grounds for the James Templeton & Co textile factory located at Glasgow Green which had also built some company houses in nearby streets.

The main Rutherglen Academy building, a Category B listed structure which survived a World War II bomb intended for nearby industrial sites, was redeveloped into 36 residential apartments in 2001, with the other buildings demolished and further modern flats constructed within the footprint, in a complex known as Academy Gate.

At the Gallowflat site, the main building (a replacement for the original which was destroyed by a fire in 1941) was used by Rutherglen High School, an additional educational needs facility, from 1999 until 2008 when they relocated to a new campus shared with the rebuilt Cathkin High School.

The main building at Gallowflat was soon replaced by a nursing home, David Walker Gardens, opened in 2011. The remaining east block at Gallowflat (the home economics department, its age reflected in its 'Girls' carving above the door – the demolished 'Boys' block further west housed the technical subjects) is also Category B listed but lay empty and disused for over two decades; plans to convert it into residences were approved in 2015 and this was eventually completed by 2024.

== Feeder Schools ==
The primary schools whose pupils progress to Stonelaw include Bankhead Primary School, Burgh Primary School, Burnside Primary School, Calderwood Primary School, and Spittal Primary School, all located within Rutherglen, James Aiton Primary School in Cambuslang, and Park View Primary School in Halfway.

The inclusion of Park View Primary in Stonelaw's catchment list following its construction in 2014 caused some controversy locally, as other schools nearby (including Hallside Primary in Drumsagard which was too small to accommodate local pupils, requiring the construction of Park View to be built to resolve the issue) are affiliated to Cathkin High School; however due to capacity issues there, the new school was linked to Stonelaw despite the sites being 2.3 miles (3.7 km) apart, which – along with another new school in Newton being affiliated to Uddingston Grammar School – caused concern from parents that divisions would be created in the communities of eastern Cambuslang. By contrast, Calderwood Primary is immediately adjacent to the Stonelaw buildings.

== Notable alumni ==
=== Stonelaw High School (1970–) ===
- Ray Deans, footballer
- Simon Donnelly, footballer
- Jayd Johnson, actress
- Scott Kyle, actor
- Suzie McAdam, actress
- Stevan McAleer, racing driver
- William McLachlan, footballer
- Jonathan Saunders, fashion designer
- Richard Rankin, actor
- Steven Saunders, footballer
- Scott Stewart, footballer
- Alan Trouten, footballer
- Gary Erskine, artist
- Audrey Tait, musician

=== Rutherglen Academy (1926–1970) ===
- Archie Baird, footballer (Aberdeen etc.)
- Sir Denis William Brogan, historian, Professor of Political Science from 1939 to 1968 at the University of Cambridge, father of Hugh Brogan
- Janet Brown, female impressionist
- Andy Cameron, comedian
- Steven Campbell (artist)
- Duncan Glen, poet
- Niall Hopper, footballer
- Adam Little, footballer
- George Logan, best known as Dr Evadne Hinge of the comedy act Hinge and Bracket
- Mamie Magnusson, journalist
- Donny McLean, footballer
- Jim McColl OBE, entrepreneur and "Scotland's richest man" (£800 million in 2008)
- Prof Edwin Morgan OBE, Titular Professor of English from 1975 to 1980 at the University of Glasgow, and National Poet for Scotland from 2004 to 2010
- Alexander Pollock, Conservative MP for Moray and Nairn / Moray from 1979 to 1987
- Adam Thomson CBE, founder of Caledonian Airways (managing director from 1964 to 1970 and chief executive from 1970 to 1988)
- Midge Ure, musician

=== Stonelaw Public School (1886–1926) ===
- Alec Bennett, footballer
- Stan Laurel, actor, writer and comedian ("Laurel and Hardy")

=== Notable former teachers ===
- Norman Buchan, Labour MP from 1983 to 1990 for Paisley South
- Bill Butler, politician
- Jonathan Page, footballer
- Alistair MacLean, Scottish novelist, taught at Gallowflat School
- Harry Johnston (PE teacher), footballer with Montrose and Partick Thistle and cricketer for Scotland
- Jim Holmes, janitor, footballer with Greenock Morton
