= United Abstainers F.C. =

Former association football club in Scotland

United Abstainers
- Full name: United Abstainers Athletic Football Club
- Nickname(s): the Abstainers, the Teetotallers
- Founded: 1887
- Dissolved: 1893
- Ground: Victoria Park, Glasgow
Home colours

United Abstainers Football Club was a football club from Crosshill in Glasgow.

== History ==
The club, sometimes referred to as the United Abstainers Athletic Club, was formed by William Shanks, agent and collector for the Scottish Temperance League. Although the club was nicknamed the Teetotallers, the players were not complete abstainers; their refreshment of choice at at least one game was noted as being stout.

The Abstainers joined the Scottish Football Association and the Glasgow Football Association for the 1887–88 season. The club's first competitive fixture, in the first round of the 1887–88 Scottish Cup, was a 4–1 defeat at Pollokshields Athletic.

In 1888–89 however the team caused "a bit of a surprise" by getting revenge against a "strong" Pollokshields in the first round, beating the Athletics 2–1 at Victoria Park, the winning goal coming about ten minutes from time. In the second round however Battlefield F.C. swept the Abstainers aside, scoring 5 in the first half and 6 in the second, without reply.

The club lost in the first round of the Scottish Cup in the next two seasons, 6–2 at Rangers F.C. in 1889–90 (managing to hold the home side to 3–2 in the first half) and 11–0 at Burnbank Swifts F.C. in 1890–91. After qualifying rounds were introduced, the Abstainers entered for the next three seasons, but, drawn once against Glasgow University F.C. and twice against Battlefield in the first stage, withdrew every time before playing.

The club could not even muster one win in the Glasgow Cup. Its first match in the competition in 1887 was a 10–0 defeat at home to Shettleston F.C., being 1–0 down after four minutes and 4–0 down after a quarter of an hour. After first round defeats by both Rangers and Celtic F.C. in the next two seasons, the club scratched from its last four entries. The last references to the club in the media relate to its being drawn against Pollokshaws F.C. in the Glasgow Cup in 1893.

== Colours ==
The club played in blue and gold vertical stripes, with white shorts.

== Ground ==
The club's home ground was Victoria Park in Crosshill.

== See also ==
- Bell's Temperance F.C., temperance football club in Accrington
- Greenock Abstainers F.C., Good Templar football club in Greenock
