= Ian Harnett =

Scottish footballer

Personal information
- Full name: Ian Gerald Harnett
- Date of birth: 13 December 1926
- Place of birth: Scotland
- Date of death: June 2001 (aged 74)
- Place of death: Scotland
- Positions: Right back; wing half

Youth career
- Lochee Harp

Senior career*
Years	Team	Apps	(Gls)
1945–1961	Queen's Park	303	(2)

International career
1953–1960	Scotland Amateurs	16	(0)
- * Club domestic league appearances and goals

Ian Gerald Harnett (13 December 1926 – June 2001) was a Scottish amateur football right back who made over 300 appearances in the Scottish League for Queen's Park. He also served on the club's committee and as president. He was capped by Scotland at amateur level.

== Personal life ==
Harnett was educated at St Joseph's College, Dumfries and studied engineering at Glasgow University. He also played cricket for Forfarshire and Kilmarnock.

== Honours ==
Queens Park

- Scottish League Second Division: 1955–56
