= Dean Park F.C. =

Association football club in Glasgow City, Scotland

Dean Park
- Full name: Dean Park Football Club
- Nickname(s): the Govaners
- Founded: 1879
- Dissolved: 1885
- Ground: Osborne Park
- Match Secretary: Duncan Duff, Daniel M'Intyre
- Hon. Secretary: Alexander M'Eachan
Home colours

Dean Park Football Club was a Scottish football team, based in the Govan district of Glasgow (at the time a separate burgh).

== History ==
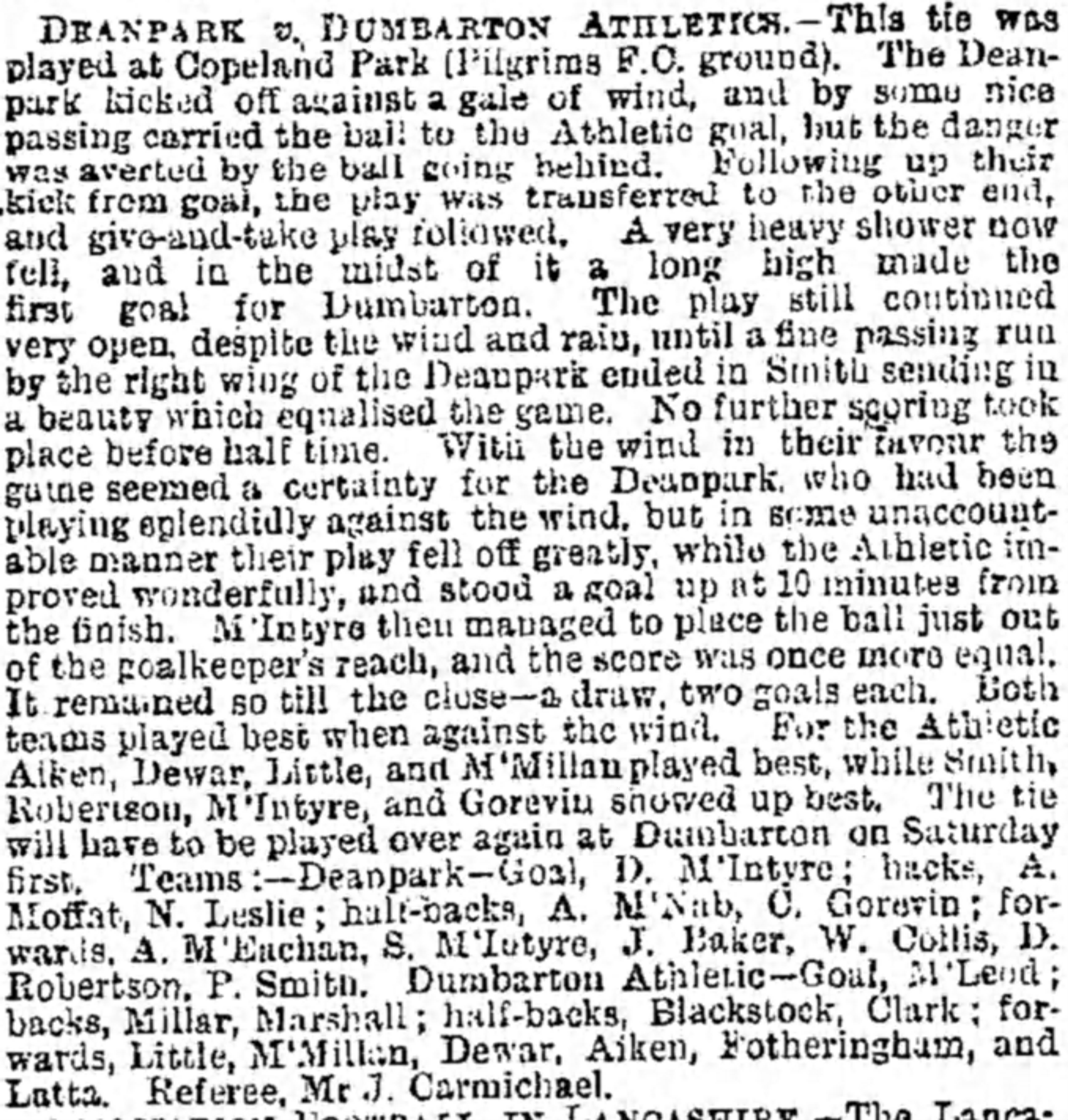
1884–85 Scottish Cup 3rd Round, Dean Park 1–1 Dumbarton Athletic, Glasgow Herald, 27 October 1884

The club was founded in 1879, and in August 1883, after a season in which the club won 17 out of 24 matches, was accepted as a member of the Scottish Football Association.

The club entered the 1883–84 Scottish Cup and lost to Mavisbank in the first round. Dean Park protested, on the basis that the referee was a member of the Mavisbank club; the protest was dismissed, but, unusually, "under the circumstances", the Scottish FA returned the deposit to Dean Park.

The club's second and last entry to the competition in 1884–85 was more successful - the club gained the benefit of a first round bye, playing a friendly against Central instead; right-winger Peter Morton scored a hat-trick in a 4–1 win, but the match was bittersweet, as it was Morton's last for the club, having agreed to join Rangers. In the second round, Dean Park beat Springburn Hibernians 2–0 in a match held at Rangers' Kinning Park, Robertson scoring the first goal for Dean Park in the first minute. In the third, the club earned a replay against the strong Dumbarton Athletic side with a draw at the Pilgrims ground of Copeland Park, and a Dean Park protest against an ineligible player led to the replay also being held at Govan; however Athletic won 3–0 at the second time of asking.

The club's membership that season was just 40, one of the smallest in Glasgow, and at the season's close the club was taken over by Govan neighbours Whitefield. The name was revived for a Junior club in 1888.

== Colours ==
The club wore dark blue jerseys, white knickers, and red stockings.

== Grounds ==
The club first played at Osborne Park, Summerton Road, Govan. In 1884 the club moved to Woodville, on Copeland Road, which was also the ground of the Telegraphists, and susceptible to flooding.
