= Pilgrims F.C. (Glasgow) =

Former association football club in Scotland

Pilgrims
- Full name: Pilgrims Football Club
- Founded: 1880
- Dissolved: 1886
- Ground: Copeland Park
- Match Secretary: David M'Intosh
- Hon Secretary: Frederick Franz
1880–82 colours	1884–86 colours

Pilgrims Football Club was a Scottish football club based in Govan, now in Glasgow, active in the 19th century.

== History ==
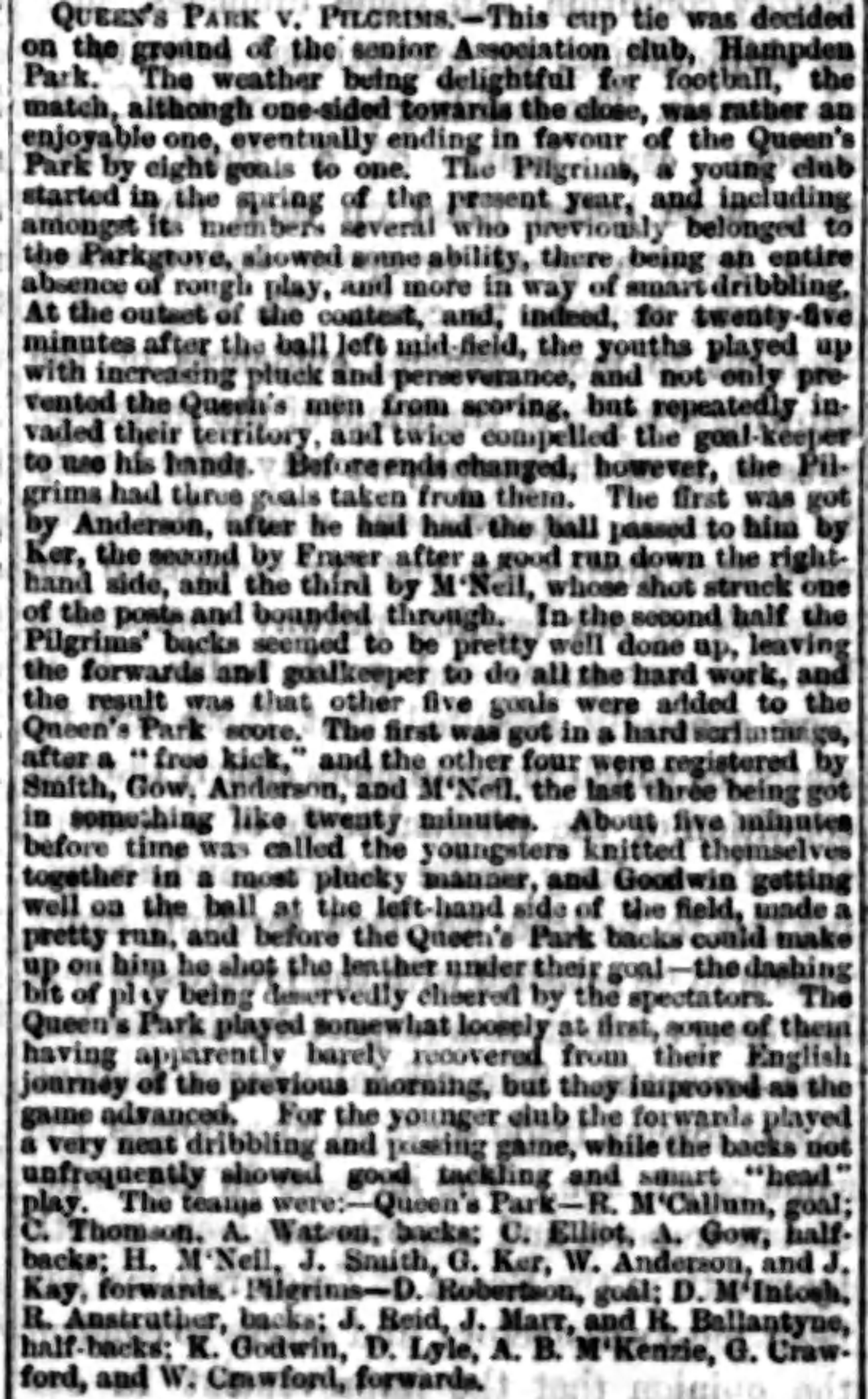
Third round Scottish Cup tie against Queen's Park, North British Daily Mail, 25 October 1880

The club was founded in March 1880 with 40 members; in what remained of the 1879–80 season, the club played two matches, with a scoring record of 7–2. It was a resolutely amateur side, in common with neighbouring sides Queen's Park, Battlefield, and Pollokshields Athletic; occasionally players from all four teams would form an exhibition side under the name Glasgow Wanderers.

The club was also boosted in 1880 by the admission of many of the members of the Parkgrove club, which was also faced with having to give up its Trinidad Park ground.

The Pilgrims entered the Scottish Cup every year from 1880–81 until 1885–86. Its best run came in its first entry. The club beat Lancefield at Middleton Park in the first round, S. Lyall scoring all 4 goals in a 4–2 win, despite the "great credit" of visiting goalkeeper Boyd, who "used both hands and feet cleverly, and saved his charge repeatedly". In the second round the club gained its biggest Cup win - 7–0 over City - but in the third round it was brought down to earth by its record defeat, 8–1 against fellow travellers Queen's Park.

Despite this promising start, the club only won one more Cup tie - in the first round in the 1882–83 Scottish Cup, beating Possilpark 6–0. In 1883, the club took over South Western, which was also using Copeland Park, the Pilgrims name evidently carrying more of a cachet as South Western had over 80 members compared to the Pilgrims' 46.

The club was still prominent enough in the 1884–85 season to be invited to open Beresford Park, the new ground of Ayr, the home side winning the inaugural match 3–1. Towards the end of the season, Walter Lamont, a left-winger, became the only Pilgrims player to earn an international cap; Lamont had a dream debut, scoring the first goal in Scotland's 8–2 win over Ireland, but was not capped again.

With the rise of professionalism in England, and south Glasgow being saturated with amateur clubs, the Pilgrims fell away; the club failed to pay its subscription for the 1886–87 season and was therefore struck off the Scottish Football Association member roll.

== Colours ==
The club's initial colours were 1" white and ½" black hooped jerseys with blue knickers, and stockings of any colour. In 1881 the club changed to a more regular 1" black and white hooped jersey, and in 1883 to white knickers.

In 1884, perhaps in honour of the takeover of South Western, the club changed its jerseys to South Western's orange and black, albeit in stripes.

== Ground ==
The club's first home ground was Middleton Park. After a season the club moved to Copeland Park. On the club's dissolution, Copeland Park was hired out to the new St Peter's club.

== Notable players ==
- Walter Lamont, the club's only international player
