= Arthur Wharton =

First black professional footballer

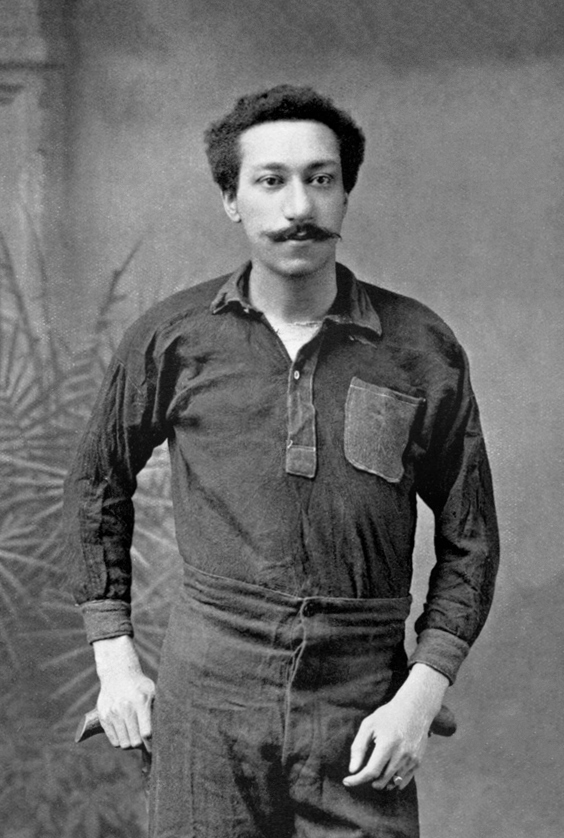

Personal information
- Date of birth: 28 October 1865
- Place of birth: Jamestown, Gold Coast
- Date of death: 13 December 1930 (aged 65)
- Place of death: Edlington, Yorkshire, England
- Positions: Goalkeeper; winger

Senior career*
Years	Team	Apps	(Gls)
1885–1886	Darlington		
1886–1888	Preston North End		
1889–1894	Rotherham Town	19	(0)
1894–1895	Sheffield United	1	(0)
1895–1896	Rotherham Town	15	(0)
1896–1897	Stalybridge Rovers		
1897–1899	Ashton North End		
1899–1901	Stalybridge Rovers		
1901–1902	Stockport County	6	(0)
- * Club domestic league appearances and goals

Arthur Wharton (28 October 1865 – 12 December 1930) was a British footballer. He is widely considered to be the first black professional footballer in the world. Though not the first black player outright – the amateurs Robert Walker, of Queen's Park, and Scotland international player, Andrew Watson (possibly a professional before Arthur Wharton for Bootle F.C. in 1887), predate him – Wharton may have been the first black professional and the first to play in the Football League.

== Early life, ancestry and early career ==
Wharton was born in Jamestown, Gold Coast (now part of Accra, Ghana). His father Henry Wharton was a Grenadian missionary of Scottish and West African descent, while his mother, Annie Florence Egyriba was a member of the Fante Ghanaian royalty. In his home country Wharton attended Mfantsipim School. Wharton moved to England in 1882 at age 19, to train as a Methodist missionary, but soon abandoned this in favour of becoming a full-time athlete.

He was an all-round sportsman – in 1886, he equalled the amateur world record of 10 seconds for the 100-yard sprint in the AAA championship. He was also a keen cyclist and cricketer, playing for local teams in Yorkshire and Lancashire. However, Wharton is best remembered for his exploits as a footballer; while he was not the first mixed-heritage footballer in the United Kingdom — leading amateurs Robert Walker and Scotland international Andrew Watson predate him, however Wharton was the first mixed-heritage footballer to turn professional.

== Football career ==
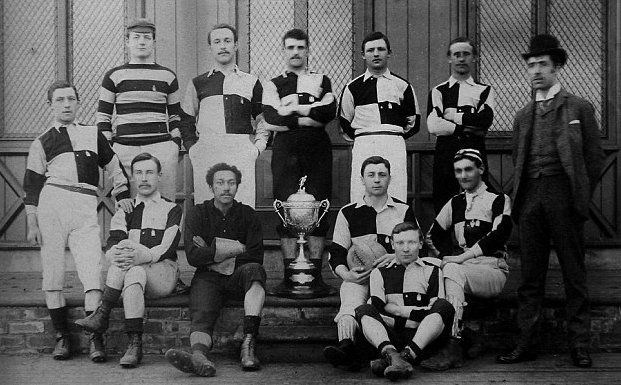
Wharton (seated second from left on front row) while playing for Darlington F.C. (1887)

Wharton started as an amateur playing as a goalkeeper for Darlington F.C., where he was spotted by Preston North End after playing against them. He joined them as an amateur, and was part of the team that reached FA Cup semi-finals in 1886–87. During the third round victory against Renton, Wharton's clean sheet was described by Athletic News as "one of the best exhibitions of goalkeeping I have seen for a long time." Though part of "The Invincibles" of the 1880s, he left Preston in 1888 to concentrate on his running, and thus was not part of the team that subsequently won the Double in 1888–89.

In 1888 the Sheffield Football Association agreed to give a testimonial to Sheffield Wednesday's Billy Mosforth, versus Preston North End. The meeting of both clubs in the FA Cup meant that the match was postponed until February, by which point the Olive Grove was snow covered and the match was switched to Bramall Lane. Arthur volunteered for the 'Sheffield Wednesday and District' team but despite both clubs being locked into a draw in the first half Preston ran away with the match, winning 8–1. It was reported that Wednesday's heavy loss was "in great measure owing to the wretched performance of Wharton, who utterly failed to uphold his high reputation as a goalkeeper" and that he "could not have stopped the ball had it been half as big as a balloon". It was reported that at times the Wednesday fans applauded every kick Arthur took and one fan angrily asked the Preston team where they had "brought him from" as it was well known that Arthur was a former Preston player. There were even fears that Arthur would be the victim of violence as he left the field. Arthur did have a connection to Sheffield Wednesday, through his trainer in Sheffield 'Billy' South, who amongst other noted Sheffield sporting icons of the day also trained Wednesday's Tommy Crawshaw.

Having failed to impress at Sheffield Wednesday he returned to football in 1889, joining Rotherham Town, signing as a professional. In 1890 he married Emma Lister (1866–1944) at Rotherham in Yorkshire. By 1891 he was the landlord of the Albert Tavern in Rotherham. In 1894 he moved to Sheffield United, though he was understudy to regular first-team goalkeeper William "Fatty" Foulke. During the 1894–95 season, Wharton played three games for Sheffield United, against Leicester Fosse, Linfield and Sunderland — the latter being a First Division game, making Wharton the first mixed-heritage player to play in the top flight. In 1895 he left for Stalybridge Rovers but after falling out with the management moved to Ashton North End in 1897, where he opened a tobacconist shop in Ashton-under-Lyne. Ashton North End went bankrupt in 1899, and he returned to Stalybridge Rovers, playing with a young Herbert Chapman, before seeing out his career playing for Stockport County of the Second Division in 1901–02. As well as playing in goal, he would also occasionally feature outfield as a winger.

== Legacy ==
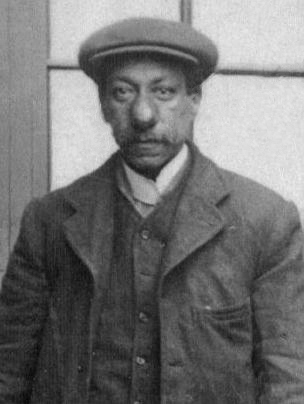
Arthur Wharton in later years

Having developed a drinking problem, Wharton retired from football in 1902 and found employment as a colliery haulage worker at the Yorkshire Main Colliery in Edlington. By 1911 he was employed as a collier and living in Moorthorpe, West Yorkshire, with wife Emma. When World War I began in 1914 Wharton joined the Volunteer Training Corps (roughly equivalent to the Home Guard of World War II), volunteering to give his life in defence of Britain if called upon. On his death in 1930 he was buried in an unmarked pauper's grave. The grave was given a headstone in 1997 after a campaign by anti-racism campaigners Football Unites, Racism Divides. In 2003 Wharton was inducted into the English Football Hall of Fame in recognition of the impact he made on the game. A campaign to have a statue erected in Darlington as well as in Rotherham to acknowledge Wharton's achievements has gained wide support within the professional game. In 2012, a small statue of Wharton was presented to Sepp Blatter at the headquarters of FIFA, where it will be on permanent display. On 16 October 2014, a statue honouring Wharton was unveiled at St George's Park National Football Centre in Burton.

In 2020, a mural was unveiled in Darlington on Arthur Wharton's 155th anniversary.

== Career statistics ==
Club	Season	League			FA Cup		Other		Total	
Club	Season	Division	Apps	Goals	Apps	Goals	Apps	Goals	Apps	Goals
Preston North End	1886–87	—			6	0	—		6	0
Preston North End	1887–88	—			0	0	—		0	0
Preston North End	Total		—		6	0	—		6	0
Darlington	1887–88	—			1	0	—		1	0
Rotherham Town	1893–94	Division Two	19	0	1	0	—		20	0
Sheffield United	1894–95	Division One	1	0	0	0	1 (Note: Appearance in United Counties League)	0	2	0
Rotherham Town	1895–96	Division Two	15	0	5	0	—		20	0
Stockport County	1901–02	Division Two	6	0	0	0	1 (Note: Appearance in Manchester Senior Cup)	0	7	0
Career total			41	0	13	0	2	0	56	0
