= Luton F.C. (Glasgow) =

Former association football club in Scotland

Luton
- Full name: Luton Football Club
- Founded: 1879
- Dissolved: 1883
- Ground: Nelson Park
- President: Mr P. W. Scott
- Secretary: James Nisbet
Home colours

Luton Football Club was a 19th-century association football club based at Plantation, Glasgow.

== History ==
The club was founded in the 1879–80 season, originally as a junior club, and was an inaugural member of the Scottish Junior Football Association in 1880. Luton played in the first Scottish Junior Cup in 1880–81, which at the time was a one-off competition and not played again for five years.

Luton became a senior club in 1881 and entered the Scottish Cup three times, playing twice. It lost 9–1 against Northern in the first round in 1881–82 - the Luton goal coming after the ball was "fouled at the Northern goal" - and 4–0 at Clyde in 1882–83.

The club was a founder member of the Glasgow Football Association in April 1883, but its short existence ended before the next season started, as it was taken over by the Possilpark club. The club had already entered the Scottish Cup for 1883–84 and had to scratch from its tie with Whitefield.

== Colours ==
The club's colours were originally black and white hoops with white knickerbockers, changing to navy knickerbockers for its final season.

== Ground ==
The club played at Nelson Park, although its Cup tie with Northern was held at Lorne Park, the home of Mavisbank.
