= Tommy Barr =

Scottish footballer

Personal information
- Full name: Thomas Barr
- Date of birth: 23 April 1942 (age 84)
- Place of birth: Carluke, Scotland
- Position: Right back

Senior career*
Years	Team	Apps	(Gls)
- Lanark United
1965–1974	Queen's Park	236	(2)

International career
1965–1971	Scotland Amateurs	22	(0)
- * Club domestic league appearances and goals

Thomas Barr (born 23 April 1942) is a Scottish retired amateur football right back who made over 230 appearances in the Scottish League for Queen's Park. He represented Scotland at amateur level.
