= Ian Campbell (Queen's Park footballer) =

Scottish footballer

Personal information
- Full name: Ian Campbell
- Place of birth: Scotland
- Positions: Forward; midfielder

Senior career*
Years	Team	Apps	(Gls)
- Ardeer Recreation
1965–1977	Queen's Park	219	(52)

International career
1966–1971	Scotland Amateur	12	(6)
- * Club domestic league appearances and goals

Ian Campbell is a Scottish retired amateur football forward and midfielder who made over 210 appearances in the Scottish League for Queen's Park.
