= Willie Hastie =

Scottish footballer

Personal information
- Full name: William McKenzie Hastie
- Date of birth: 7 January 1924
- Place of birth: Plantation, Scotland
- Date of death: 14 November 1995 (aged 71)
- Positions: Left half; left back

Senior career*
Years	Team	Apps	(Gls)
–1948	Gala Fairydean Rovers		
1948–1958	Queen's Park	282	(14)

International career
1949–1957	Scotland Amateurs	21	(0)
1952	Great Britain	1	(0)
- * Club domestic league appearances and goals

William McKenzie Hastie (7 January 1924 – 14 November 1995) was a Scottish amateur footballer who made more than 280 appearances in the Scottish League for Queen's Park as a left half. He represented Scotland at amateur level and made one friendly appearance for Great Britain. After his retirement as a player, Hastie became a coach at Queen's Park.

== Honours ==
Queen's Park

- Scottish League Second Division: 1955–56
