= Oxford F.C. =

Former association football club in Scotland

Oxford
- Full name: Oxford Football Club
- Founded: 1873
- Dissolved: 1881
- Ground: Bellevue Park
- President: James Caddell
- Secretary: James J. Brown
- Captain: Charles Gibson
Home colours

Oxford Football Club was a Scottish association football club based in the Crosshill area of Glasgow.

== History ==
The club claimed a foundation date of 1869, but this probably refers to the cricket club from which the football club emerged. The club's first recorded football matches did not take place until 1874, the very first being a 0–0 draw against Rangers on Glasgow Green, and 1873–74 was the club's first season of football, with a record of 2 wins, 6 draws, and 3 defeats, scoring 9 and conceding 8.

The club competed in the Scottish Cup for seven seasons between 1874 and 1881. The first tie the club played was a 2–0 defeat at Rangers in 1874–75, the first goal coming when McNeil "sent both the Oxford goalkeeper [M'Kinley] and the ball underneath the tape".

The club only made it to the second round twice. The first time, in 1878–79, was under the rule that both clubs advanced after two drawn matches; the club drew twice against Derby of Glasgow before losing 2–1 at Govan F.C. in the second round.

The second occasion was in 1880–81, when a 6–0 victory against the Maxwell club, thanks to goals from Kaye (2), Martin, Smith, M'Lean, and Dunlop, was the club's only win in the competition. The club lost 4–3 at Cowlairs in the second round in a "fast and speedy" match, and the club does not appear to have played again; although it entered the 1881–82 Scottish Cup, it scratched before the first round tie with Pilgrims of Glasgow.

== Colours ==
The club played in blue and white jerseys with red stockings.

== Ground ==
The club originally played at Queen's Park. From 1879 the club played at Bellevue Park.
