= Jimmy Ward (footballer, born 1929) =

Scottish footballer

Personal information
- Full name: James Ward
- Date of birth: 26 July 1929
- Place of birth: Shettleston, Scotland
- Date of death: October 1985 (aged 56)
- Place of death: Bournemouth, England
- Position: Centre forward

Senior career*
Years	Team	Apps	(Gls)
1952–1956	Queen's Park	75	(47)
1953–1956	Hendon	13	(5)
1956–1957	Crewe Alexandra	6	(0)
1957	Queen's Park	2	(0)
1957–1958	Hounslow Town		
1958–1959	St Johnstone	2	(0)

International career
1953–1956	Scotland Amateurs	8	(0)
- * Club domestic league appearances and goals

James Ward (26 July 1929 – October 1985) was a Scottish amateur football centre forward who played in the Scottish League for Queen's Park and St Johnstone. He also played in the Football League for Crewe Alexandra and was capped by Scotland at amateur level.
