= Walter Lamont =

Scottish footballer

Personal information
- Position: Right winger

Senior career*
Years	Team	Apps	(Gls)
- Apsley
- Corinthians
- Pilgrims

International career
1885	Scotland	1	(1)
- * Club domestic league appearances and goals

Walter Lamont was a Scottish footballer who played as a right winger.

== Career ==
Lamont played club football for Apsley, Pilgrims and Corinthians, and made one appearance for Scotland in 1885.
