= Thomas Britten =

Welsh footballer

Personal information
- Full name: Thomas Johnson Britten
- Date of birth: 6 March 1858
- Place of birth: Byton, England
- Date of death: 24 October 1910 (aged 52)
- Place of death: Johannesburg, South Africa
- Position: Centre forward

Senior career*
| Years | Team | Apps | (Gls) |
| 1878 | Parkgrove | | |
| 1880 | Presteigne | | |

International career
| 1878–1880 | Wales | 2 | (0) |
- * Club domestic league appearances and goals

Thomas Johnson Britten (6 March 1858 – 24 October 1910) was a footballer. Though born and raised in rural Herefordshire in England, his birth was registered in the nearest town Presteigne across the Welsh border and he was deemed eligible to play for the Wales national football team, which he did twice in 1878 and 1880. He made his debut on 23 March 1878 against Scotland and played his second and last match on 27 March 1880 against the same opposition.

Britten had other links to Scotland as he worked in Glasgow for several years, playing for the local club Parkgrove and for a Glasgow select in an inter-city challenge match. His profession as a mining engineer took him around Britain, and he appeared for several other regional representative teams (which convened fairly regularly in that era). In 1880 he was playing club football in Wales for Presteigne, and in 1887 he was with London club Crusaders. He declined the offer of another Wales cap at least twice in the 1880s, and due to his birthplace he was also invited to play for England but remained on the reserve list and never made an appearance. He later emigrated to South Africa where he was a noted figure in the field of mining machinery.

== See also ==
- List of Wales international footballers born outside Wales
