= Parkgrove F.C. =

Former association football club in Scotland

Parkgrove
- Full name: Parkgrove Football Club
- Founded: 1874
- Dissolved: 1897
- Ground: Kinning Park 1874-1876; Clifford Park 1876- 77; Trinidad Park 1877-1880
Home colours

Parkgrove F.C. were a nineteenth-century Glasgow-based senior football club. They were based in Govan, Glasgow.

== History ==
Originally the team played in red & blue colours (1874–79); but for the 1879–80 season they changed to a white shirt with thin black hoops.

The club is notable for having two of the earliest known black footballers; Andrew Watson and Robert Walker. While at Parkgrove, Watson became the club's match secretary – making him also the first black administrator in association football.

It was noted that Parkgrove played with a cosmopolitan team. Thomas Britten, a Welsh international football player, played for the club in 1878. Another of its players, goalkeeper Tommy Marten, was noted as being from Japan although it was later established that he was half Chinese.

The club made the fifth round of the Scottish Cup in 1879–80. They drew with South Western; but were beaten in the replay. South Western progressed to the Quarter-Finals but were beaten by Pollokshields Athletic.

=== Decline ===
The club couldn't make a game with Dunfermline F.C. on New Year's Day 1880. Many of the club's players moved to the new Pilgrims side for the 1880–81 season.

It was noted that Parkgrove moved out of their Trinidad Park ground in 1880. A notice of the ground at the Broomloan estate states that Parkgrove recently moved - and that the ground was now for let. Kinning Park, home of Rangers at the time Parkgrove played at Trinidad Park, was fairly near; The Gers moved to the first Ibrox Park, directly adjacent to the Trinidad site, in 1887.

The Scottish Referee noted on 8 October 1894 that they were asked to contradict a rumour that the Parkgrove club were about to collapse. It noted that the secretary advised that the club was in healthy condition and was likely to survive for many days.

The club was still extant late that same year, playing Rangers on 15 December 1894 in the Kirkwood Shield competition. They were still playing in 1896 as they were in a Partick Thistle-sponsored tournament in season 1896–97; however, by August 1897, Parkgrove was listed by the Scottish Referee as one of the many defunct clubs of Glasgow.

== Notable former players ==
- Andrew Watson, Scottish international football player; and the first black association football player.
- Robert Walker, another black player to play association football alongside Watson at Parkgrove.
- Thomas Britten, Welsh international player - who was noted as Parkgrove's leading striker.
