= St Peter's F.C. =

Association football club in Glasgow City, Scotland

St Peter's
- Full name: St Peter's F.C.
- Nickname: the Saints
- Founded: 1885
- Dissolved: 1887
- Ground: Eastvale Park
- Hon. Secretary: John Kennedy
- Match Secretary: John Murray
Home colours

St Peter's F.C. was a football club from Glasgow, active in the mid-1880s.

== History ==
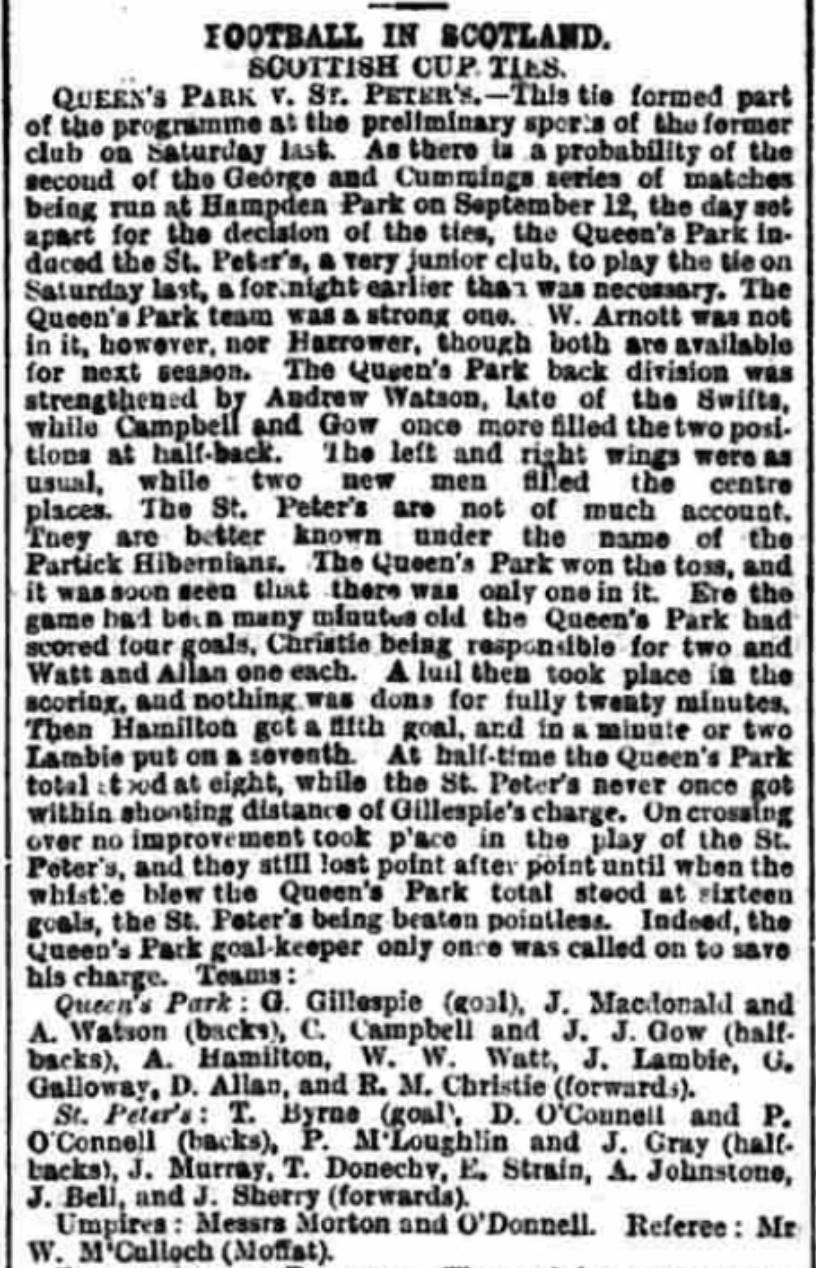
1885–86 Scottish Cup 1st Round, Queen's Park 16–0 St Peter's, The Sportsman, 1 September 1885

The club was formed in Kelvinhaugh, Glasgow in 1885, under the name Partick Hibernians, its first recorded game being a 1–0 defeat to Woodbank.

In August 1885, the club changed its name to St Peter's (possibly named after St Peter's church in Partick), joined the Scottish Football Association, and entered the 1885–86 Scottish Cup. The club had the misfortune to be drawn at Queen's Park in the first round, and the tie was moved up a week so that it could be one of the entertainments at the Queen's Park athletic sports. Within ten minutes, Queen's Park was four goals to the good, by half-time the score was 8, and by the end 16, St Peter's only making Gillespie in the Queen's Park goal work once. The score remains the Spiders' record victory and, at the time, was the second-highest win in the Scottish Cup.

The club survived its baptism of fire and even picked up a big win itself in October, 9–1 against Mearns Athletic. However the club lost both of its other competitive matches - 6–1 to Clyde in the first round of the 1886–87 Scottish Cup and 3–1 to Whitefield in the 1886–87 Govan Charity Cup, although a week after the defeat to Clyde, St Peter's scored a remarkable 5–0 victory over a scratch side from Hibernians F.C. The game was however notable for taking place at Glengarry Park, the home of the Columba club started up by Brother Walfrid, and to raise funds for a charity run by him, proving to be a key influence in the foundation of Celtic.

St Peter's did not renew its subscription for a third season of senior football and the last record of the club is of John Rae breaking his thigh bone during training in March 1887. By 1888 Copeland Park was no longer being used for football.

== Colours ==
The club wore light blue jerseys, dark blue "pants", and scarlet hose.

== Ground ==
St Peter's originally played at Eastvale Park, 10 minutes' walk from the Finnieston car stop, the club crossing the Clyde to Copeland Park in August 1886, replacing the Pilgrims as tenants of the Customs Cricket Club.
