= Peter Buchanan (footballer, born 1938) =

Scottish footballer

Personal information
- Full name: Peter Gordon Blyth Buchanan
- Date of birth: 14 February 1938 (age 88)
- Place of birth: Scotland
- Position: Centre forward

Senior career*
Years	Team	Apps	(Gls)
–1960	Pollok		
1960–1969	Queen's Park	210	(124)

International career
1961–1966	Scotland Amateurs	17	(11)
1964	Great Britain	2	(2)
- * Club domestic league appearances and goals

Peter Gordon Blyth Buchanan (born 14 February 1938) is a Scottish retired amateur footballer who made over 200 appearances as a centre forward in the Scottish League for Queen's Park. He later served on the club's committee and as president. He is Scotland's joint-top scorer at amateur level and made two 1964 Summer Olympic qualifying appearances for Great Britain.

== Honours ==
Scotland Amateurs

- FA Centenary Amateur International Tournament
