= Ray Deans =

Scottish footballer

Personal information
- Full name: Raymond Alexander Deans
- Date of birth: 24 January 1966 (age 60)
- Place of birth: Lanark, Scotland
- Position: Striker

Youth career
- Chelsea

Senior career*
Years	Team	Apps	(Gls)
1983–1985	Clyde	53	(14)
1985–1986	Doncaster Rovers	19	(5)
Total		72	(19)
- * Club domestic league appearances and goals

Raymond Alexander Deans (born 24 January 1966) is a Scottish retired footballer.

A former pupil of Stonelaw High School in Rutherglen, Deans started his career as an apprentice with Chelsea before moving back to Scotland in 1983. He made his Clyde debut aged 17 under manager Craig Brown, and went on to score 14 league goals for the club in two years, before transferring to Doncaster Rovers for a fee of £40,000. He only spent a season there, as injury forced him to retire in 1986, aged only 20.
