= Laurie McBain (footballer) =

Scottish footballer

Personal information
- Full name: Laurence Durkie McBain
- Date of birth: 7 December 1907
- Place of birth: St Andrews, Scotland
- Date of death: 20 September 1937 (aged 29)
- Place of death: Dundee, Scotland
- Position: Forward

Senior career*
Years	Team	Apps	(Gls)
1924–1927	Queen's Park	43	(21)
1927–1933	St Johnstone	105	(16)
1929	→ Raith Rovers (loan)	7	(1)
1933	Dundee United	15	(3)

International career
1926	Scotland Amateurs	1	(2)
- * Club domestic league appearances and goals

Laurence Durkie McBain (7 December 1907 – 20 September 1937) was a Scottish professional footballer who made over 100 appearances in the Scottish League for St Johnstone as a forward. He also played for Queen's Park, Dundee United and Raith Rovers and was capped by Scotland at amateur level.
