= Maxwell F.C. =

Former association football club in Scotland

Maxwell
- Full name: Maxwell Football Club
- Founded: 1878
- Dissolved: 1882
- Ground: Norwood Park
- Secretary: R. Thomson Wilson
Home colours

Maxwell F.C. was a nineteenth-century Glasgow-based senior football club.

== History ==
The club was founded in 1878 and its first fixtures are reported from the 1879–80 season. In 1880, after a season in which the club won 11 of 17 matches, it joined the Scottish Football Association.

The club only played one season of senior football. Maxwell's only match in the Scottish Cup was a 6–0 defeat in the first round of the 1880–81 tournament to Oxford of Crosshill in the first round; it was the Oxford's only win in the competition in seven seasons.

The club is notable for being the first club of the first black football player, Andrew Watson. Another Maxwell player - Louis Baretto - was a lascar sailor born in Bombay.

== Colours ==
The club wore navy and white hooped jerseys and hose, with white knickers.

== Ground ==
The club had a private ground at Norwood Park, on Dumbreck Road, near Haggs Castle. By 1882 it was the ground of Granton, and of Sir John Maxwell, which was founded in the same year as the Maxwell, although it joined the Scottish Association separately in 1882.

== Notable former players ==
- Andrew Watson (footballer, born 1856), Scottish international football player; and the first black association football player.
