= Possilpark F.C. =

Former association football club in Scotland

Possilpark
- Full name: Possilpark Football Club
- Founded: 1876
- Dissolved: 1884
- Ground: Saracen Park
- Hon. President: R. Fulton Esq.
- President: Mr J. Oliver
Home colours

Possilpark Football Club was a 19th-century football club from the Possilpark area of Glasgow in Scotland. The club no longer exists and has been replaced by Glasgow Perthshire F.C., which plays in the West of Scotland Football League.

== History ==
The club was founded in 1876, under the name Possil Park; the media used the names Possil Park and Possilpark almost interchangeably, and from 1880 to 1884 the club gave its name as Possilpark.

The club entered the Scottish Cup almost as soon as it was founded, in 1876–77, losing 2–1 at home to Blythswood in the first round, T. Brown scoring the club's goal. The club's second match in the competition, the following season, was a 13–0 defeat to Rangers, which still remains the 'Gers' (joint) biggest margin of victory in a competitive match.

In its 9 entries in the Cup, the club only won 3 ties; 2 of them coming in 1879–80, which (thanks to a bye) put the club in the fourth round, made up of 22 clubs. However the club then suffered another heavy defeat, by a score given as 12–0 or 13–0, to eventual finalists Thornliebank.

The club was boosted before the 1883–84 season by amalgamating with Luton, bringing the club up to a still-small membership of 50.

The club's last (and biggest) Cup win came in its last entry in 1884–85, with a 7–0 win over Cyrus of north-east Glasgow. Possilpark lost in the next round at home "before a considerable following of both clubs" to Battlefield, 3–0, with two Battlefield claims not being allowed.

The Cup defeat was the club's last reported fixture. Although the club had been not insubstantial, by 1883 it had been eclipsed in its neighbourhood by Cowlairs and Northern. Saracen Park was put up for sale or rent in November 1884, suggesting the club could no longer pay its rent, and the Carrick side, which had existed at a junior level for a decade, took the ground over from 1885 onwards. The coup de grâce for Possilpark came when the Scottish Football Association struck the club from the register for non-payment of subscriptions before the 1885–86 season.

== Colours ==
The club wore the following colours:

Colours
Years	Jersey colour	Shorts
1877–78	Black, red and white hoops	
1878–80	Navy with white Maltese cross	
1880–81	Navy with white Maltese cross	Navy
1881–82	Navy	Navy
1882–84	Royal blue	
1884–85	Black & white hoops	Navy

== Ground ==
The club played at Saracen Park, behind the Saracen Foundry, in Possilpark, north Glasgow. The pitch was 120 yards x 78 yards, and the ground had a clubhouse and 36 ft tall flagpole. The ground is close to the current Saracen Park, opened in 1937.
