= Junior Omand =

Scottish footballer

Personal information
- Full name: William Omand
- Date of birth: 14 September 1931
- Place of birth: Glasgow, Scotland
- Date of death: January 2005 (aged 73)
- Place of death: Scotland
- Positions: Outside left; left half

Youth career
- –1949: Giffnock North
- 1949–1951: Queen's Park

Senior career*
Years	Team	Apps	(Gls)
1951–1962	Queen's Park	258	(63)

International career
1953–1961	Scotland Amateurs	19	(6)
- * Club domestic league appearances and goals

William Omand (14 September 1931 – 2005), known as Junior Omand, was Scottish amateur footballer who made over 250 appearances in the Scottish League for Queen's Park as an outside left. He later became president of the club. Omand represented Scotland at amateur level and played for touring team Middlesex Wanderers. As a player, he was described as "something of a reversion to the traditional Scottish inside forward, hunched over the ball and driving towards the opposition goal".

== Personal life ==
Omand attended Queen's Park Secondary School.

== Honours ==
Queen's Park

- Scottish Football League Division Two: 1955–56
