= Mavisbank F.C. =

Association football club in Glasgow City, Scotland

Mavisbank
- Full name: Mavisbank Football Club
- Founded: 1877
- Dissolved: 1884
- Ground: Lorne Park
- Secretary: Archibald Taylor Jr
Home colours

Mavisbank Football Club was a Scottish football team, based in the Pollokshields district of Glasgow (at the time a separate burgh).

== History ==
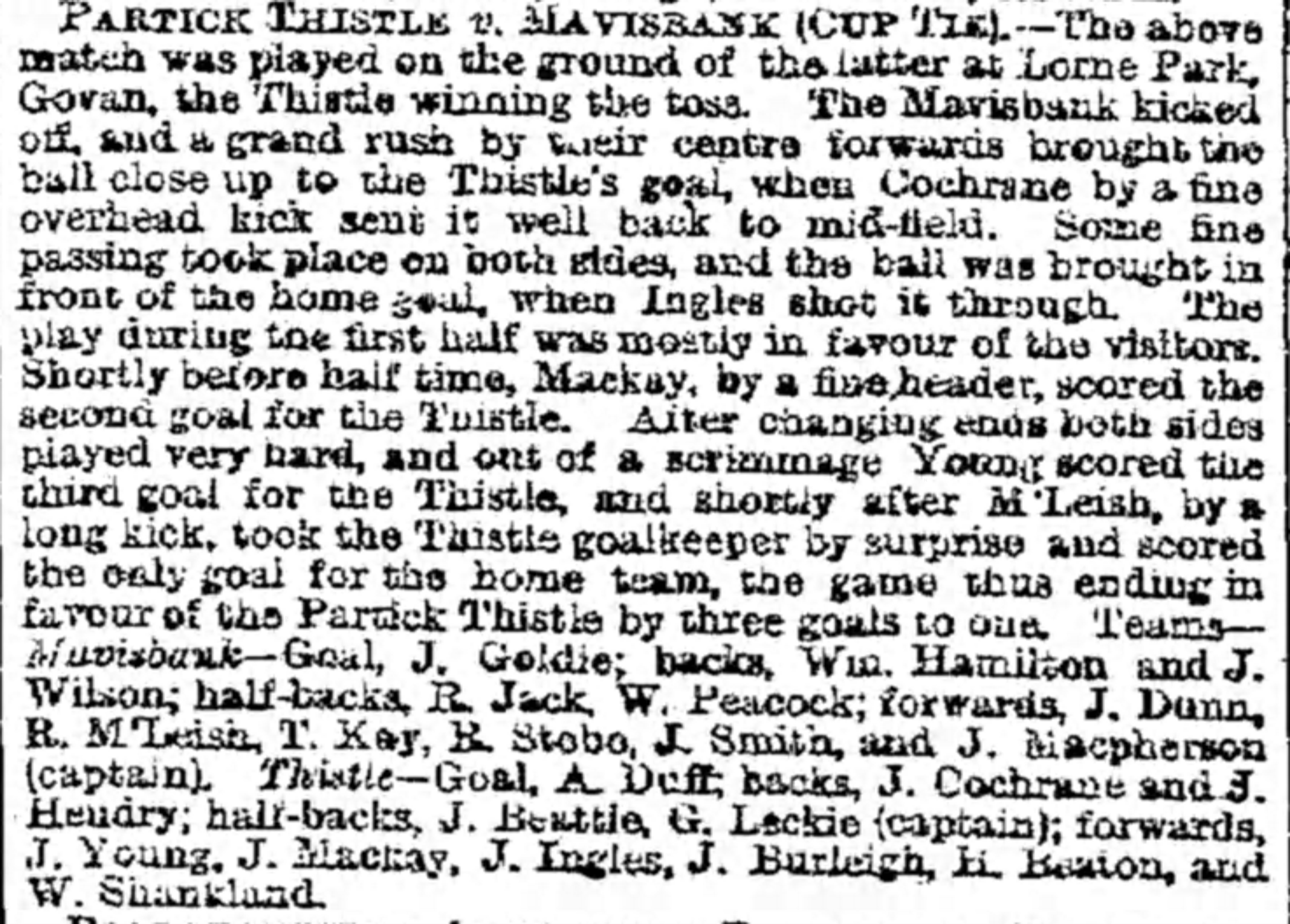
1881–82 Scottish Cup 1st Round, Mavisank 1–3 Partick Thistle, Glasgow Herald, 12 September 1881

The club was founded in 1877, out of a cricket club, with matches reported from the 1878–79 season. After playing at a low-level for four years, the club joined the Scottish Football Association in 1881. It was drawn to play Partick Thistle in the 1881–82 Scottish Cup for its competition debut, and lost 3–1 to the older club.

The club entered the competition twice more, both times winning in the first round against a more junior club, but losing in the second to a more experienced club. Its 14–2 defeat to Partick Thistle in the second round in 1882–83 was the Jags' biggest competitive for half-a-century; Mavisbank had been drawn at home, but switched the tie for a bigger gate, and found itself 10–0 down at half-time.

Mavisbank's last win in the competition, over Dean Park in 1883–84, drew a protest from the losing side, on the basis that the referee was a member of the Mavisbank club; the protest was dismissed, but, unusually, "under the circumstances", the Scottish FA returned the deposit to Dean Park. The club's final tie was a 6–2 defeat at neighbours Pollokshields Athletic, the half-time score being 2–2, but Mavisbank not having taken advantage of having the wind behind it in the first half.

Despite having 65 members in 1883–84, which made it a mid-sized club in Glasgow, the club ceased playing soon after the Athletic defeat, and was struck from the membership roll in August 1884.

== Colours ==
The club wore navy blue jerseys and white knickers.

== Grounds ==
The club played at Lorne Park, which had been the hone of Ramblers until 1877 and Pollokshields Athletic until 1878, and would become the home ground of Pollokshields/St Andrew's.
