= Malky Mackay (footballer, born 1942) =

Scottish footballer

Malky Mackay MBE
Personal information
- Full name: Malcolm Dingwall Mackay
- Date of birth: 19 January 1942 (age 84)
- Place of birth: Saltcoats, Scotland
- Position: Forward

Senior career*
Years	Team	Apps	(Gls)
–1962	Coltness United		
1962–1976	Queen's Park	352	(126)

International career
1966–1971	Scotland Amateurs	20	(6)
1967	Great Britain	1	(0)
- * Club domestic league appearances and goals

Malcolm Dingwall Mackay MBE (born 19 January 1942) is a Scottish former amateur footballer who made over 350 appearances in the Scottish League for Queen's Park. He later became president of the club and is a member of the club's committee. Mackay represented Scotland at amateur level and made one friendly appearance for Great Britain.

== Personal life ==
Mackay is married with two sons and a daughter. His oldest son, Malcolm Jr, also became a professional football player and manager. As of February 2012, aged 70, Mackay was semi-retired and working for an insurance company in Glasgow. He was appointed a Member of the Order of the British Empire (MBE) in the 2015 New Year Honours for services to football in Glasgow.
