= Doug Grant (footballer) =

Scottish footballer

Personal information
- Full name: Douglas Alistair Glennie Grant
- Date of birth: 10 January 1938 (age 88)
- Place of birth: Elgin, Scotland
- Position: Wing half

Senior career*
Years	Team	Apps	(Gls)
- Elgin City
1959–1964	Queen's Park	115	(14)
- Elgin City

International career
1959–1968	Scotland Amateurs	23	(5)
- * Club domestic league appearances and goals

Douglas Alistair Glennie Grant (born 10 January 1938) is a Scottish retired amateur footballer who made over 110 appearances as a wing half in the Scottish League for Queen's Park. He represented Scotland at amateur level.
