= Joseph Kyle =

Scottish footballer

Personal information
- Full name: Joseph Reid Kyle
- Date of birth: 16 October 1913
- Place of birth: Barrhead, Scotland
- Date of death: November 1962 (aged 49)
- Place of death: Haymarket, Scotland
- Position: Inside forward

Senior career*
Years	Team	Apps	(Gls)
1934–1943	Queen's Park	160	(63)

International career
1935–1939	Scotland Amateurs	11	(7)
1936	Great Britain	1	(0)
- * Club domestic league appearances and goals

Joseph Reid Kyle (16 October 1913 – November 1962) was a Scottish amateur footballer who played as an inside forward in the Scottish League for Queen's Park. He represented Great Britain at the 1936 Summer Olympics and was capped by Scotland at amateur level.
