= David Letham =

Scottish footballer and administrator

Personal information
- Date of birth: 7 May 1922
- Place of birth: Glasgow, Scotland
- Date of death: 17 March 2007 (aged 84)
- Place of death: East Renfrewshire, Scotland
- Position: Wing half

Youth career
- 1940–1946: Queen's Park

Senior career*
| Years | Team | Apps | (Gls) |
| 1946–1951 | Queen's Park | 98 | (12) |
- * Club domestic league appearances and goals

David Letham (7 May 1922 – 17 March 2007) was a Scottish football player and administrator.

== Biography ==
Letham attended John Street Secondary School in Bridgeton from 1934. In 1942 he completed teacher training at Jordanhill College. He then enlisted in the RAF as a navigator until the end of the war. He became a Physical Education teacher at John Street, where he remained, with the exception of several years' service in Bernard Street and Albert Secondary schools, until his retirement in 1982. He was principal PE teacher from 1969.

== Playing career ==
Letham played as a wing half for Queen's Park, making 98 appearances in the Scottish Football League.

Letham was also a member of the Great Britain squad at the 1948 Summer Olympics.

== Administration career ==
After retiring as a player, Letham became President of both Queen's Park and the Scottish Football League.
