= Willie Paul (footballer) =

Scottish footballer

Personal information
- Date of birth: 7 February 1866
- Place of birth: Partick, Scotland
- Date of death: 23 October 1911 (aged 45)
- Place of death: Govan, Scotland
- Position: Centre forward

Senior career*
Years	Team	Apps	(Gls)
1884–1901	Partick Thistle	106	(70)
1890	→ Queen's Park (loan)	0	(0)

International career
1888–1890	Scotland	3	(5)
- * Club domestic league appearances and goals

William Paul (7 February 1866 – 23 October 1911) was a Scottish footballer who played for Partick Thistle and Scotland as a centre forward.

== Career ==
Paul featured for Partick Thistle across three decades, with his statistics in competitive matches for the club standing at 127 goals in 218 appearances. As an amateur, he was free to play for other teams and assisted Queen's Park on several occasions, particularly in the 1890–91 season, also playing for the Clydesdale Harriers (today purely an athletics club but in that era also involved in football, its members including several of the west of Scotland's leading players).

He was capped three times by Scotland and scored five goals (including four in one match in 1890).

== Personal life ==
Paul also worked as a shipwright at the Glasgow dockyards. He died in 1911, at age 45, from an appendix-related ailment. He was buried in the Western Necropolis in Maryhill.

== See also ==
- List of Scotland national football team hat-tricks
