= Willie Turner (footballer) =

Scottish footballer

Personal information
- Full name: William Turner
- Date of birth: c. 1866
- Position: Forward

Senior career*
Years	Team	Apps	(Gls)
- Pollokshields Athletic

International career
1885–1886	Scotland	2	(1)
- * Club domestic league appearances and goals

William Turner (born c. 1866) was a Scottish footballer who played as a forward.

== Career ==
Turner played club football for Pollokshields Athletic, and made two appearances for Scotland, scoring one goal.
