= Albert Alexander Gray =

British physician and otologist

Albert Alexander Gray FRSE (8 October 1868 – 4 January 1936) was a British physician and otologist.

== Life ==
He was born at Firbank, a large villa in Pollokshields in Glasgow, one of the nine children of William Gray, a biscuit manufacturer in his role as principal partner of Gray Dunn & Co (creators of the Blue Riband Biscuit), and his wife, Margaret Sarah Pace. He was educated at Bootham School (an independent Quaker boarding school) in Yorkshire and then Glasgow Academy. he then studied medicine at Glasgow University graduating MB in 1890. He immediately began to specialise in diseases of the ear. He practiced at Glasgow Royal Infirmary and lectured at Glasgow University.

He received his doctorate (MD) in 1897. In 1898 he was elected a Fellow of the Royal Society of Edinburgh. his proposers were John Gray McKendrick, Magnus Maclean, William Jack and Sir William Thomson (Lord Kelvin).

His later life was spent working at the Ferens Institute of Oto-Laryngology (1927 until death).

He died, aged 67, in 1936.

== Family ==
Among his siblings was the footballer Woodville Gray, a Scottish international.

In 1892 he married Mabel Henderson. They had two sons: Donald Gray and Oliver Gray.

== Publications ==
- The Labyrinth of Animals (1908)
- The Ear and its Diseases (1910)
- Otosclerosis (1917)
- The Mechanism of the Cochlea (1924) co-written with George Wilkinson
