= Frank Shaw (footballer) =

Scottish footballer

Personal information
- Full name: Francis Watson Shaw
- Date of birth: 13 May 1864
- Place of birth: Glasgow, Scotland
- Position: Winger

Senior career*
Years	Team	Apps	(Gls)
- Pollokshields Athletic
- Queen's Park

International career
1884	Scotland	2	(1)
- * Club domestic league appearances and goals

Francis Watson Shaw (born 13 May 1864) was a Scottish footballer who played as a winger.

== Career ==
Born in Glasgow, Shaw played club football for Pollokshields Athletic and Queen's Park, and made two appearances for Scotland in 1884. He retired from football in 1885 to sail to India.
