= William Sellar =

Scottish footballer

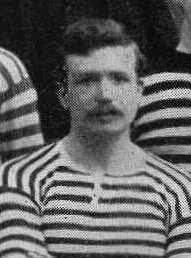
Sellar in Queen's Park kit, 1890

William Sellar (21 September 1866 – 10 June 1914) was a Scottish footballer, who played for Queen's Park, Battlefield, Rangers and Scotland.

== See also ==
- List of Scotland national football team captains
