= Archie Kyle =

Scottish footballer

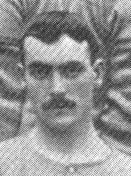

Personal information
- Full name: Archibald Kyle
- Date of birth: 13 July 1883
- Place of birth: Kinning Park, Scotland
- Date of death: 21 July 1957 (aged 74)
- Place of death: Glasgow, Scotland
- Position: Centre forward

Youth career
- Parkhead

Senior career*
Years	Team	Apps	(Gls)
1904–1908	Rangers	99	(47)
1908–1909	Blackburn Rovers	36	(8)
1909	Bradford Park Avenue		
1910	Bo'ness		
1910	Linfield		
1910–1911	Clyde	27	(6)
1911–1914	St Mirren	90	(12)
1914–1918	Hamilton Academical	129	(32)

International career
1906–1908	Scottish League XI	2	(1)
- * Club domestic league appearances and goals

Archibald Kyle (13 July 1883 – 21 July 1957) was a Scottish football player who played for Rangers, Blackburn Rovers and Hamilton Academical.

== Career ==
Kyle joined Rangers from Parkhead in 1904. He was one of a number of Roman Catholic players at the club during the early 1900s. Kyle made 110 League and Scottish Cup appearances for the club and scored 52 goals during his four-season spell. He was unable to claim any major honours in an era when rivals Celtic were dominant, the nearest being a runners-up medal from the 1904–05 Scottish Cup.

He left Rangers 1908 to move to England with Blackburn Rovers and later Bradford Park Avenue before a brief stint in Ireland at Linfield. Kyle returned to Scotland and played with Clyde, St Mirren and Hamilton Academical.

== Personal life ==
Kyle married Letitia Hargreaves in 1905 and raised his family in Bridgeton, Glasgow. His grandson from daughter Mary "Catherine" Miller née Kyle is singer-songwriter Frankie Miller.

In 1924, he and John Browning, a former Celtic player, were found guilty of attempting to bribe Bo'ness player Peter Brown in a public house in Glasgow's Dundas Street: both men were sentenced to 60 days' hard labour.
