= Robert Walker (Third Lanark footballer) =

Scottish footballer

Youth career
- –1875: Queen's Park

Senior career*
| Years | Team | Apps | (Gls) |
| 1875–1877 | 3rd Lanark RV | 0 | (0) |
| 1877–1878 | Parkgrove | 0 | (0) |
| Total | | 0 | (0) |
- * Club domestic league appearances and goals

Robert Walker was a Scottish footballer who was one of the first black players of the sport. He played in the late 1870s for Parkgrove (alongside fellow black player Andrew Watson) and between 1875 and 1877 for 3rd Lanark RV (with whom he was a runner-up in the 1876 Scottish Cup Final). He took part in two trials for the Scotland national football team (1876 and 1877), but this did not lead to a full cap.

== See also ==
- Andrew Watson (footballer, born 1856) – the first black person to play association football. Watson played for Maxwell, Parkgrove, and Queen's Park before being capped for Scotland
- James Robertson (rugby union, born 1854) – the first black person to play rugby union. Robertson played for Royal HSFP and represented Edinburgh District in the 1870s.
- Willie Clarke (footballer) – the first black player to score in the English Football League, a Scottish footballer who played for Third Lanark in the late 1890s.
