= James Jessiman =

Scottish footballer

Personal information
- Full name: James F. Jessiman
- Place of death: Barrhead, Scotland
- Positions: Inside forward; wing half

Senior career*
Years	Team	Apps	(Gls)
1919–1920	Raith Rovers	13	(3)
1920–	East Stirlingshire		
1924–1925	Arthurlie	27	(1)
1925–1929	Morton	109	(24)
1930–1931	Stenhousemuir	16	(3)
- * Club domestic league appearances and goals

James F. Jessiman was a Scottish footballer who made over 100 appearances in the Scottish League for Morton as an inside forward and wing half. He also played for Arthurlie, Stenhousemuir, Raith Rovers and East Stirlingshire.

== Career statistics ==
Appearances and goals by club, season and competition
Club	Season	League			Scottish Cup		Total	
Club	Season	Division	Apps	Goals	Apps	Goals	Apps	Goals
Raith Rovers	1919–20	Scottish First Division	13	3	1	0	14	3
Arthurlie	1924–25	Scottish Second Division	27	1	2	1	29	2
Morton	1925–26	Scottish First Division	30	2	3	0	33	2
Morton	1926–27	Scottish First Division	35	3	1	0	36	3
Morton	1927–28	Scottish Second Division	35	18	2	1	37	19
Morton	1928–29	Scottish Second Division	9	1	1	0	10	1
Morton	Total		109	24	4	1	116	25
Stenhousemuir	1930–31	Scottish Second Division	16	3	1	0	17	3
Career total			165	31	11	2	176	33
