= Niall Hopper =

Scottish footballer (1935–2024)

Personal information
- Full name: Niall Campbell Randells Hopper
- Date of birth: 9 September 1935
- Place of birth: Scotland
- Date of death: 11 July 2024 (aged 88)
- Positions: Forward; right half

Senior career*
Years	Team	Apps	(Gls)
–1955	Cambuslang Rangers		
1955–1969	Queen's Park	286	(60)

International career
1956–1969	Scotland Amateurs	27	(6)
1967	Great Britain	3	(0)
- * Club domestic league appearances and goals

Niall Campbell Randells Hopper (9 September 1935 – 11 July 2024) was a Scottish amateur footballer who played in the Scottish League for Queen's Park as a wing half and inside forward. He represented Scotland at amateur level and made three friendly appearances for Great Britain.

== Honours ==
Queen's Park

- Scottish League Division Two: 1955–56
