= George Jessiman =

Scottish footballer (1900–1986)

Personal information
- Full name: George Thomas Russell Jessiman
- Date of birth: 24 September 1900
- Place of birth: Gorbals, Scotland
- Date of death: 1986 (aged 86)
- Place of death: Glasgow, Scotland
- Position: Outside left

Senior career*
| Years | Team | Apps | (Gls) |
| –1922 | Arthurlie | | |
| 1922–1923 | Morton | 29 | (1) |
| 1923–1927 | Arthurlie | 120 | (58) |
| 1927–1931 | Clyde | 82 | (11) |
| 1931–1932 | Albion Rovers | 26 | (9) |
| 1932–1933 | Alloa Athletic | 1 | (0) |

International career
| 1926 | Scotland Amateurs | 1 | (1) |
- * Club domestic league appearances and goals

George Thomas Russell Jessiman (24 September 1900 – 1986) was a Scottish amateur football outside left who made 120 appearances in the Scottish League for Arthurlie. He also played for Clyde, Morton, Albion Rovers and Alloa Athletic and was capped by Scotland at amateur level.

== Career statistics ==
Appearances and goals by club, season and competition
| Club | Season | League | | | Scottish Cup | | Other | | Total | |
| Club | Season | Division | Apps | Goals | Apps | Goals | Apps | Goals | Apps | Goals |
|---|---|---|---|---|---|---|---|---|---|---|
| Morton | 1922–23 | Scottish First Division | 29 | 1 | 1 | 0 | — | | 30 | 1 |
| Arthurlie | 1923–24 | Scottish Third Division | 31 | 13 | — | | 2 (Note: Appearances in Scottish Qualifying Cup) | 0 | 33 | 13 |
| Arthurlie | 1924–25 | Scottish Second Division | 31 | 11 | 2 | 0 | — | | 33 | 11 |
| Arthurlie | 1925–26 | Scottish Second Division | 31 | 20 | 3 | 2 | — | | 34 | 22 |
| Arthurlie | 1926–27 | Scottish Second Division | 27 | 14 | 3 | 1 | — | | 30 | 15 |
| Arthurlie | Total | | 120 | 58 | 8 | 3 | 2 | 0 | 130 | 61 |
| Clyde | 1927–28 | Scottish First Division | 30 | 2 | 1 | 0 | — | | 31 | 2 |
| Clyde | 1928–29 | Scottish First Division | 36 | 6 | 3 | 0 | — | | 39 | 6 |
| Clyde | 1929–30 | Scottish First Division | 16 | 3 | 0 | 0 | — | | 16 | 3 |
| Clyde | Total | | 82 | 11 | 4 | 0 | — | | 86 | 11 |
| Albion Rovers | 1931–32 | Scottish Second Division | 26 | 9 | 2 | 0 | — | | 28 | 9 |
| Alloa Athletic | 1932–33 | Scottish Second Division | 1 | 0 | 0 | 0 | — | | 1 | 0 |
| Career total | | | 258 | 79 | 15 | 3 | 2 | 0 | 275 | 82 |

== Honours ==
Arthurlie

- Scottish League Third Division: 1923–24
