= Woodville Gray =

Scottish footballer

Personal information
- Date of birth: 10 June 1866
- Place of birth: Govan, Lanarkshire, Scotland
- Date of death: 28 February 1938 (aged 71)
- Place of death: Birkenhead, Cheshire, England
- Position: Forward

Senior career*
Years	Team	Apps	(Gls)
- Glasgow Academy
- Pollokshields Athletic
- Queen's Park

International career
1886	Scotland	1	(0)
- * Club domestic league appearances and goals

Woodville Gray (10 June 1866 – 28 February 1938) was a Scottish footballer who played as a forward.

== Career ==
A member of a large and successful Quaker family who manufactured biscuits (Gray Dunn & Co), Gray played club football for Glasgow Academy, Pollokshields Athletic and Queen's Park (his handful of appearances as a 'guest player' including a Glasgow Merchants Charity Cup victory and an appearance on the losing side in the 1885 FA Cup Final).

He made one appearance for Scotland in 1886; he had first been called up in 1883, which would have made him the youngest player in the nation's history – but he had to decline the invitation.

Among his siblings was the physician Albert Alexander Gray.
