= James Crawford (footballer, born 1904) =

Scottish footballer

Personal information
- Full name: James M. Crawford
- Date of birth: 21 May 1904
- Place of birth: Shettleston, Scotland
- Date of death: 24 May 1976 (aged 72)
- Place of death: Castle Douglas, Scotland
- Position: Outside right

Senior career*
Years	Team	Apps	(Gls)
1922–1937	Queen's Park	449	(102)

International career
1926–1935	Scotland Amateurs	10	(5)
1931–1933	Scotland	5	(0)
1931–1935	Scottish League XI	3	(1)
1936	Great Britain	3	(0)
- * Club domestic league appearances and goals

James M. Crawford (21 May 1904 – 24 May 1976) was a Scottish amateur footballer who played as an outside right for Queen's Park in the Scottish League in the 1920s and 1930s.

== Representative career ==
Crawford was one of the last amateur players to earn selection for Scotland and won five caps in the early 1930s, plus three selections for the Scottish League XI. As an amateur, he was also eligible for selection by Great Britain at the Olympic Games and he played in both of the team's matches in Berlin in 1936. Crawford also represented Scotland at amateur level.

== Personal life ==
Crawford attended Whitehill Secondary School. As well as a footballer he was also an accomplished sprinter, winning several Scottish titles and setting national records. Away from sport he worked as a clothing retailer and served in the Royal Air Force during World War II.

== See also ==
- List of one-club men in association football
