= Bert Cromar =

Scottish footballer and club president

Personal information
- Full name: Robert Lindsay Cromar
- Date of birth: 8 October 1931
- Place of birth: Glasgow, Scotland
- Date of death: 4 June 2007 (aged 75)
- Place of death: Glasgow, Scotland
- Positions: Right half; right back; centre forward

Youth career
- 1948–1950: Queen's Park

Senior career*
Years	Team	Apps	(Gls)
1950–1963	Queen's Park	366	(46)

International career
1951–1963	Scotland Amateurs	35	(4)
- * Club domestic league appearances and goals

Robert Lindsay Cromar (8 October 1931 – 4 June 2007) was a Scottish amateur footballer who made over 360 appearances as a right half and right back in the Scottish League for Queen's Park. He captained the club and later served as president. Cromar represented Scotland at amateur level and captained the team on occasion.

== Personal life ==
Cromar was married with three children. He rose to the position of joint-general manager of Bank of Scotland.

== Honours ==
Scotland Amateurs

- FA Centenary Amateur International Tournament
