= Scotland national amateur football team =

Scotland Amateurs
- Association: Scottish Football Association (1926–1949, 1954–1974), Scottish Amateur Football Association (1949–1954)
- Most caps: Billy Neil (45)
- Top scorer: Donald Ford, Peter Buchanan (11)
- FIFA code: SCO
| First colours | Second colours |

First international
- England Amateurs 1–4 Scotland Amateurs (Filbert Street, Leicester; 18 December 1926)

Biggest win
- Scotland Amateurs 6–0 Ireland Amateurs (Celtic Park, Glasgow; 28 January 1933)

Biggest defeat
- England Amateurs 8–3 Scotland Amateurs (Champion Hill, Dulwich; 11 March 1939)

The Scotland national amateur football team was the amateur representative team for Scotland at football. It was formed in 1926 and continued until 1974.

== History ==
=== Origins and first match (1893–1926) ===
Following the adoption of professionalism in 1893, the Scotland national football team continued to field both professional and amateur players, but by the outbreak of the First World War in 1914, the number of amateurs winning international caps was in decline. Between the formation of the SAFA in 1909 and 1926, the SFA turned down requests from the SAFA, the FA and the FFF to stage international matches featuring a Scottish team made up of purely amateur players. One reason was that a Scottish amateur national team featuring no players from wholly amateur Scottish League First Division club Queen's Park would not be in the national interest, due to the prospective Scotland amateur matches clashing with Queen's Park's. In August 1926, the SAFA announced that the first Scotland amateur international match would take place against their English counterparts on 18 December that year at Filbert Street, with the team's selection being determined by the SFA. In front of a 10,000 crowd, Scotland won the match 4–1, courtesy of two goals from Laurie McBain and one each from George Jessiman and James Crawford.

=== Pre-war (1926–1939) ===
Between 1926 and 1939, Scottish League First Division club Queen's Park provided the majority of the players for the Scotland amateur team, with many of the players winning full international caps as well. With England as the biggest opponent and crowd draw amongst the Home Nations, the strongest possible team was selected and often included an all-Queen's Park XI. In the same period, Scotland played regular friendly matches against the Wales and Ireland amateur representative teams and the matches were used to experiment with lineups featuring amateur players from other Scottish League clubs, in addition to amateurs playing in the Highland League, East of Scotland League, the Scottish Junior leagues, for Scottish Universities and in England. Friendly matches were played versus France and Denmark in 1932.

In its first entry into the unofficial British Amateur Championship in the 1927–28 season, Scotland finished as runners-up to England and won the competition for the first time during the 1929–30 season, finishing undefeated. Further victories followed in the 1933–34, 1935–36 and 1936–37 seasons, before the outbreak of the Second World War in August 1939 caused the cessation of amateur international football. Scotland's penultimate match before the declaration of war resulted in its heaviest defeat, 8–3 versus England at Champion Hill on 11 March 1939.

=== Post-war (1939–1974) ===
Following the end of the Second World War in 1945, the Scottish amateur team did not play again until 1949. The SAFA assumed responsibility for team selection and Scotland's first match in a decade took place versus Ireland at Grosvenor Park on 16 March 1949, with John Boyd scoring a late equaliser to salvage a 2–2 draw. The team would win just two more British Amateur Championships over the next 25 years, in the 1951–52 and 1961–62 seasons. Starting in 1952, amateur internationals were regularly staged against non-Home Nations opposition and two years later, the SFA once again became responsible for team selection. The team entered two competitions in 1963, the FA Centenary Amateur Tournament and the Uhuru Cup in Kenya and finished as winners and runners-up respectively. Scotland finished as runners-up in the 1966–67 UEFA Nations Amateur Cup, losing 2–1 to Austria at the Lluís Sitjar Stadium in Palma, Majorca. The team played its final match on 5 April 1974, a 1–1 British Amateur Championship draw with England at Highfield Road. The team ceased to exist later that year, when the FA abolished the distinction between amateurism and professionalism in domestic football.

== Venues ==
The Scotland amateur team predominantly played its home matches at Hampden Park, Glasgow – a ground also home to the full Scotland national team and Queen's Park. Matches outside Glasgow were mainly played in Kilmarnock, Aberdeen and Dumfries.

== Records ==
=== Most appearances ===
| # | Name | Position | Years | Club(s) | Appearances | Goals |
|---|---|---|---|---|---|---|
| 1 | Billy Neil | CH | 1957–1969 | Airdrieonians, Queen's Park | 45 | 0 |
| 2 | Bert Cromar | WH/FB | 1951–1963 | Queen's Park | 35 | 4 |
| 3 | Niall Hopper | FW | 1956–1969 | Queen's Park | 27 | 6 |
| 4 | Doug Grant | WH | 1959–1968 | Elgin City, Queen's Park | 23 | 5 |
| 5 | Tommy Barr | FB | 1965–1971 | Lanark United, Queen's Park | 22 | 0 |
| 6 | Willie Hastie | WH/FB | 1949–1957 | Queen's Park | 21 | 0 |
| 7 | Malky Mackay | FW | 1966–1971 | Queen's Park | 20 | 6 |
| 8 | Willie Omand | WH/FW | 1953–1961 | Queen's Park | 19 | 6 |
| 9 | Peter Buchanan | FW | 1961–1966 | Queen's Park | 17 | 11 |
| 10 | Ian Harnett | FB | 1953–1960 | Queen's Park | 16 | 0 |

=== Most goals ===
| # | Name | Position | Years | Club | Goals | Appearances |
|---|---|---|---|---|---|---|
| 1 | Donald Ford | FW | 1965–1966 | Heart of Midlothian | 11 | 9 |
| 2 | Peter Buchanan | FW | 1961–1966 | Queen's Park | 11 | 17 |
| 3 | John Dodds | FW | 1930–1936 | Queen's Park | 9 | 8 |
| 4 | Peter Lorimer | WH | 1963 | Leeds United | 7 | 7 |
| 5 | Joseph Kyle | CF/IF | 1935–1939 | Queen's Park | 7 | 11 |
| 6 | George Boardman | IF | 1963 | Queen's Park | 6 | 4 |
| 7 | Ian Campbell | IF | 1966–1971 | Queen's Park | 6 | 12 |
| 8 | Willie Omand | WH/FW | 1953–1961 | Queen's Park | 6 | 19 |
| 9 | Malky Mackay | FW | 1966–1971 | Queen's Park | 6 | 20 |
| 10 | Niall Hopper | FW/RH | 1956–1969 | Queen's Park | 6 | 27 |

== Honours and achievements ==
- British Amateur Championship:
  - Winners: 1929–30, 1933–34, 1935–36, 1936–37, 1951–52, 1961–62
  - Shared: 1930–31, 1948–49, 1957–58, 1958–59, 1964–65
- FA Centenary Amateur Tournament winners: 1963
- UEFA Amateur Cup runners-up: 1966–67
- Uhuru Cup runners-up: 1963
