= Pollokshields Athletic F.C. =

Association football club in Glasgow City, Scotland

Pollokshields Athletic
- Full name: Pollokshields Athletic Football Club
- Nickname(s): Shields, the Gilded Youths, the P.A.C.
- Founded: 1875
- Dissolved: 1888
- Ground: Pollok Park
- Manager: Kenneth Wilson
Home colours

Pollokshields Athletic F.C. was a Scottish football team, based in the Pollokshields district of Glasgow (at the time a separate burgh).

== History ==
The club was founded in 1875, originally as a rugby union club, and was playing association football by 1877. The club first entered the Scottish Cup in 1877–78, losing 3–0 at Northern F.C. in the first round. The following season the club drew twice with Whiteinch F.C. in the first round, and both clubs were put through to the second; Shields were drawn at home to Queen's Park F.C. and lost heavily.

However, in 1879–80, the club reached the semi-finals for the first time, after beating Oxford F.C., Dennistoun F.C., Northern F.C., Renfrew F.C., and winning 4–0 at Cambuslang F.C. The club was favoured to beat Thornliebank F.C. in the semi-final, but neutral venues were not used at that time, and the draw had the match played at Thornliebank's ground. The home advantage proved decisive; although Shields took the lead, and generally dominated the game, the ground was "hard as iron, rendering dribbling an impossibility", and the home side scored two late goals to reach the final.

Despite recruitment for the following season, Athletic's form fell away, and the club was unable to entice English clubs for friendly matches. It did not win another Scottish Cup tie until 1882–83, when the club again miraculously reached the semi-finals; the standout result being a 5–2 replay win over the Third L.R.V. in the quarter-finals, having been 2–0 down before half-time.

The run ended against eventual winners Dumbarton F.C., the original game at Hampden Park, in front of 7,000 people, ending 1–0 to the Dumbarton club, but the goal was heavily disputed; Dumbarton claimed to have put the ball over the line in a scrimmage, and "after considerable hesitation" the goal was given, but "there were not many on the field who thought a goal had been scored, and the decision was not well received". Shields put in a protest, and Dumbarton agreed to a re-play, provided the match take place at Dumbarton's Boghead ground. With home advantage, Dumbarton won with ease.

The following season, one of the club's players, Woodville Gray, was called up for the Scotland international match with Wales, but had to withdraw. Had Gray played, he would have been Scotland's youngest-ever cap, not having had his 18th birthday at the time. Gray's one cap came before he was 20.

The club was a founder member of the Glasgow Football Association the following season and played in the first two editions of the Glasgow Cup in 1887 and 1888. Shields were competitive in the Scottish Cup for the next few seasons, a highlight being a 4–1 defeat of Dumbarton "to the surprise of the spectators", coming from 1–0 down, in 1884–85, but after that season the club did not get past the second round again. In 1886–87, the club was drawn to play St Andrew's, a local rival which used the Shields' former ground at Lorne Park, and won 5–2. However St Andrew's put in a successful protest (on the basis that the pitch markings had not been properly chalked out) and won the replayed tie - at Lorne Park - 4–1.

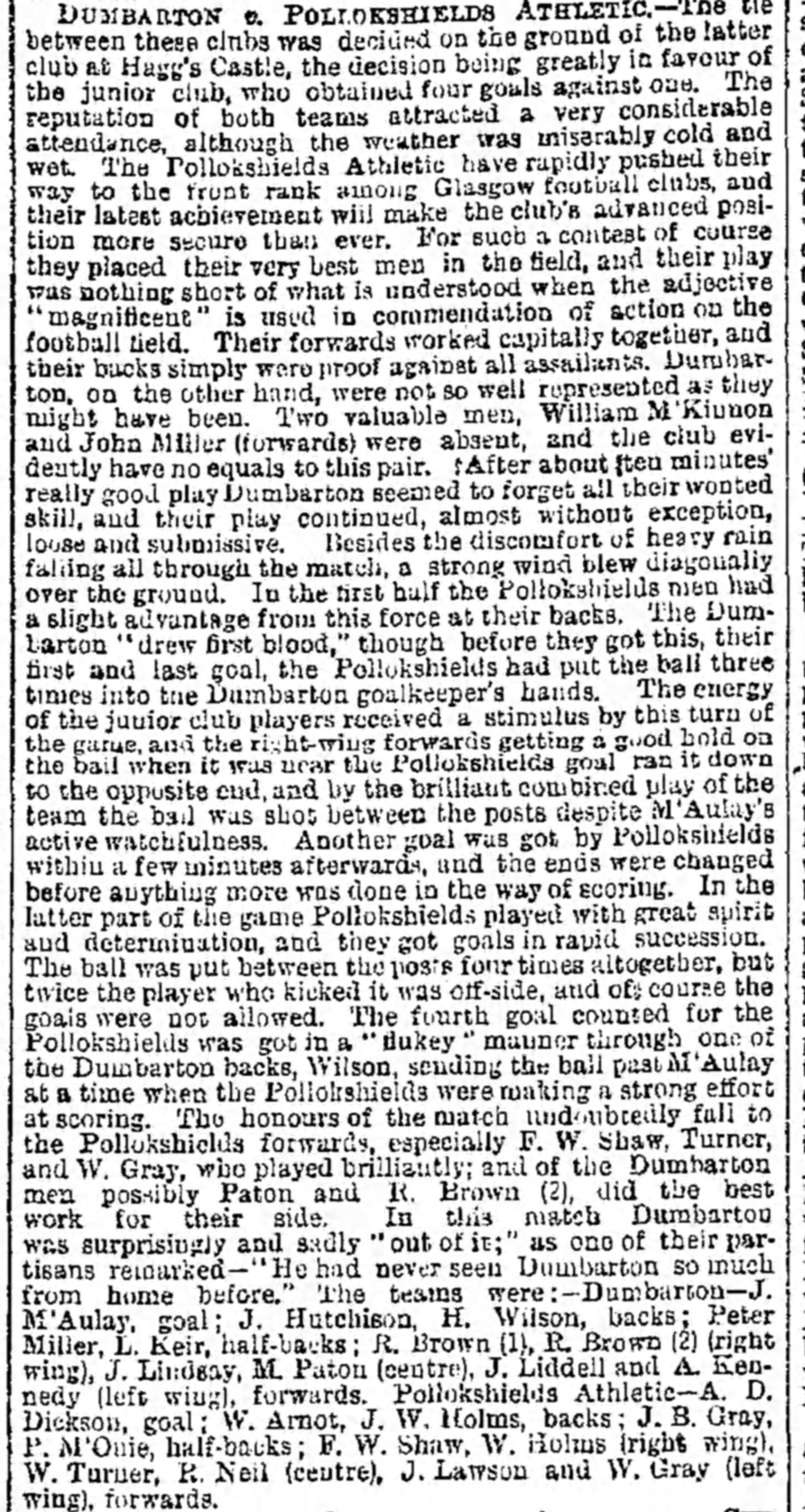
Pollokshields Athletic v Dumbarton, Scottish Cup Third Round 1884–85, from the Glasgow Herald, 27 October 1884

The club's last Scottish Cup match was in the first round of the Scottish Cup in 1888–89, when it lost to the United Abstainers F.C. side from Crosshill - the only win the Abstainers ever recorded in four entries. On 6 October 1888 the club lost 7–1 at home to Rangers F.C. in the Glasgow Cup. They were the last competitive matches of the Pollokshields club. By December, it had been taken over by fellow south Glasgow amateur side Battlefield F.C.

The name was revived in 1892 by a junior club which lasted two seasons.

== Colours ==
The club played in white shirts, navy blue shorts. From 1877 to 1884 the shirt bore a red and black badge, and from 1884 to 1887 a red, white, and black sash over the left shoulder.

== Grounds ==
For its first two seasons, the club played at Prince's Park; in 1877–78, the club used Lorne Park. From 1878 onwards the club played at Pollok Park, near Haggs Castle.

== Notable players ==
Three players won international caps for Scotland when at Shields:

- Frank Shaw (2 caps, 1884)
- Willie Turner (2 caps and 1 goal, 1885 and 1886)
- Woodville Gray (1 cap, 1886)

== See also ==
Category:Pollokshields Athletic F.C. players
