= Battlefield F.C. =

Association football club in Glasgow City, Scotland

Battlefield
- Full name: Battlefield Football Club
- Founded: 1873
- Dissolved: Aug 1897
- Ground: Mossfield Park
- Secretary: A. N. C. Smith
Home colours

Battlefield Football Club, often referred to as The Battlefield, was a 19th-century football club based in Langside, in Glasgow. The club took its name from the site of the Battle of Langside in 1568.

== History ==
The club's foundation was inspired by neighbours Queen's Park and eight of the club's initial membership were also members of the Hampden side. The club's membership was middle-class "gentlemanly" players, with a reputation for clean play that "cultivat[ed] the science of the game".

Although the club's foundation date was given as 1873, the first reported match for the club took place in October 1879, and first Scottish Cup entry was in 1881–82.

Battlefield had a reputation for causing shocks. In the 1883–84 Scottish Cup, the club beat South-Western in the Scottish Cup first round 8–1, "contrary to expectations". Battlefield reached the quarter-finals that season, which the club matched the following season, in which the club pulled off its biggest shock; beating Queen's Park 3–2 in the third round.

The defeat of Queen's Park by Battlefield, 26th October, 1884, at Hampden, in the third round of the Scottish Cup ties, created quite a sensation. Ill news travels apace. The game was finished before another tie at Cathkin Park between Rangers and 3rd Lanark was concluded. The news spread like wildfire, along the stand and round the ropes, at the latter ground, but no one believed it possible...

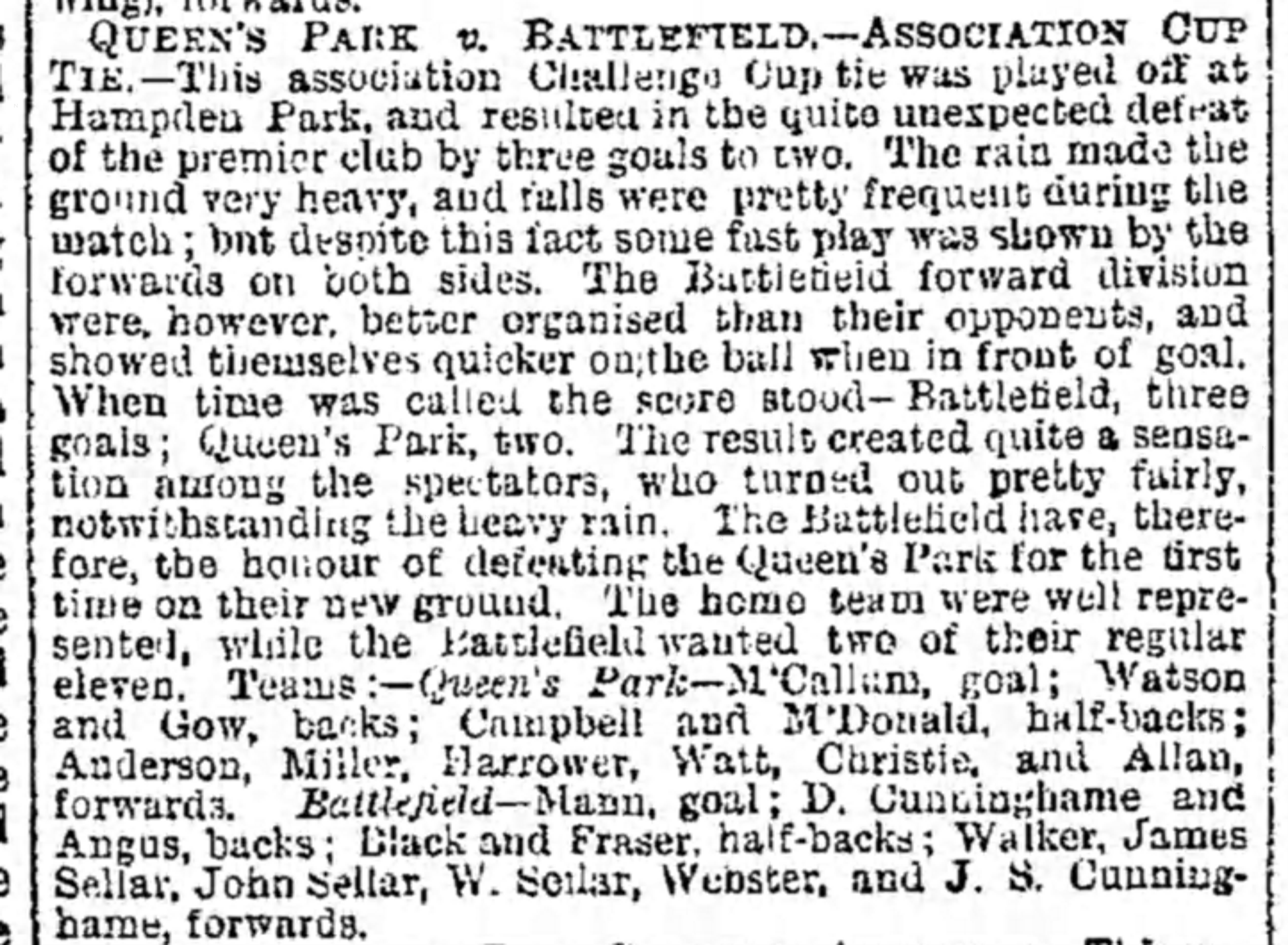
Queen's Park v Battlefield, Scottish Cup third round, 1884–85; report from the Glasgow Herald, 27 October 1884

Queen's Park protested on several bases, including having one goal wrongly disallowed, and three of the Battlefield players not having been registered, but the protests were dismissed. The size of the shock can be measured by Queen's Park reaching the FA Cup final that season.

Queen's Park felt the loss strongly and there were accusations that Battlefield was "poaching" players from Queen's Park; indeed one Smith, a member of the Queen's Park committee and secretary of Battlefield, was removed from his position at Queen's Park because of his alleged attempts at "tapping up".

After beating Pollokshields Athletic, conquerors of Dumbarton, in the fourth round, Battlefield was considered favourite to win the competition, The club was drawn to play Cambuslang in the quarter-finals, and Battlefield arranged the tie to take place at Kinning Park, but a frozen ground meant that Battlefield telegraphed Cambuslang to postpone the tie. Cambuslang agreed so long as the frost held; as temperatures rose, Cambuslang turned up at Kinning Park, but found no opposition and no referee. Cambuslang kicked a goal and claimed the tie. Battlefield's protest was upheld, but the replay was ordered to take place in Cambuslang because the uncertainty was blamed on the Battlefield. A special train was put on from Glasgow to bring the Battlefield support, and Battlefield was 1–0 up at half-time thanks to a Sellar header, but the home side turned it around to win 3–1.

With many amateur players having dual membership with Queen's Park and another club, and choosing more and more to play for the former, Battlefield boosted its ranks by taking over Pollokshields Athletic in late 1888. The instant result was a 2–1 win over Rangers at Ibrox Park, but the boost did not last long, and in the next year's Glasgow Cup, Battlefield suffered an 8–1 defeat to Queen's Park.

In the 1893–94 Scottish Cup, the club beat Scottish League club Thistle 3–1 in the first round, one of the first times a non-league side beat a League side. Battlefield lost in a second round replay to Abercorn.

The 1893–94 upset was the club's final success; professionalism and the various Scottish leagues had taken their toll on the club, with players either retiring or moving to professional clubs. Also, despite the club's success on the national stage, within Glasgow the club had never been prominent, with Queen's Park and 3rd Lanark on the club's doorstep, and other clubs in Glasgow having been paying players in secret from the 1880s onwards.

The club's final Scottish Cup tie was in the first round against St Mirren in 1894; after losing the tie, Battlefield protested on the basis that one of the Saints was under suspension for playing in an unsanctioned match. The Scottish FA upheld the protest, but St Mirren won the replayed tie by a larger margin.

The final reported senior matches for the club come from the 1896–97 season, when it was forced mostly to play friendlies. Around the end of 1896–97 season, the club was struggling as an amateur club with the likelihood of it disbanding. However they did enter the Glasgow Cup but scratched before playing a tie having disbanded.

== Colours ==
The club's colours were 1" black and white horizontal "stripes", possibly in honour of Queen's Park. In 1890 it adopted blue knickers.

== Grounds ==
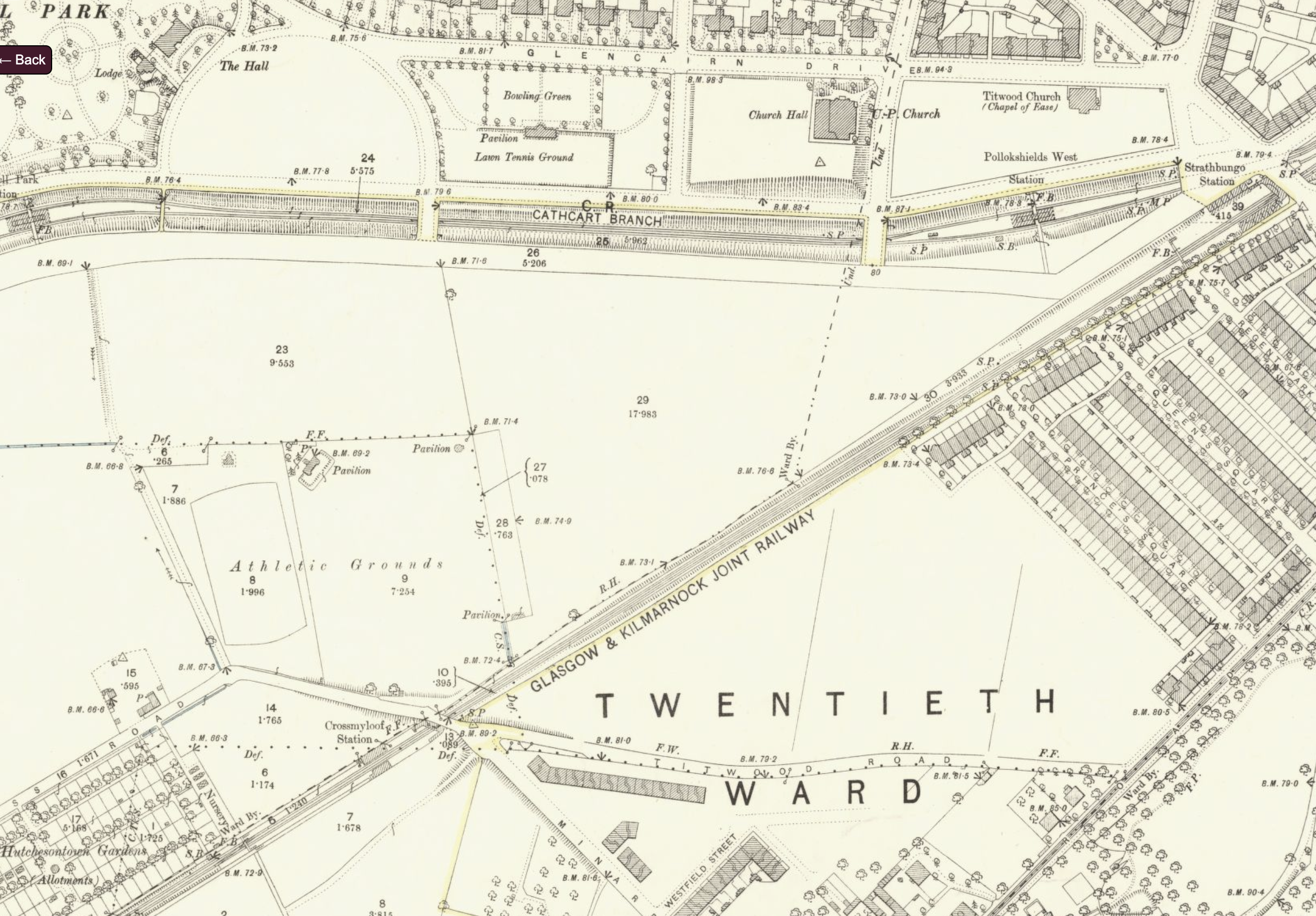
Mossfield (under the word Athletic) shown on the Renfrewshire XIII.6 map from 1899, with the Titwood cricket ground immediately to the right, and Strathbungo railway station at the top right.

The club originally played at Overdale Park. In 1884 the club moved to Mossfield, to the west of Titwood, four miles from the city centre.

== Notable players ==
- William Sellar, who won 5 caps for the Scotland national side as a Battlefield player.
- Donald Sillars, future Scotland international
- George Hector, right-winger, who represented Scotland against a Canada XI in 1891

== Records ==
=== Cups ===
- Scottish Cup:
  - Best run: quarter-finals 1883–84, 1884–85
- Glasgow Cup
  - Best run: second round 1889–90, 1891–92

=== Scoring ===
- Record competitive win: 11–0 v United Abstainers of Crosshill, Scottish Cup 1st Round, 22 September 1888.
- Record competitive defeat: 0–7 v Queen's Park, Glasgow Cup 1st Round, 19 September 1896.
