= 1955–56 Scottish Division Two =

Scottish Second Division
- Season: 1955–56
- Dates: August 28, 1955, to 30 April 1956
- Country: Scotland
- Teams: 19
- Champions: Queen's Park
- Runner up: Ayr United
- Promoted: Queen's Park; Ayr United
- Matches: 342
- Goals: 1,360 (3.98 per match)
- Biggest home win: Third Lanark v Montrose 9-0 31 December 1955
- All statistics correct as of 22 October 2025.

The 1955–56 Scottish Division Two was won by Queen's Park who, along with second placed Ayr United, were promoted to Division One. Montrose finished bottom.

In the summer of 1955, the Scottish League expanded from 32 clubs to 37 clubs. The five new teams from the Scottish Division C were: Berwick Rangers, Dumbarton, East Stirlingshire, Montrose and Stranraer (Division C was disbanded, with most of its members, which were reserve teams, moving to a separate Scottish (Reserve) League).

== Table ==
Pos	Team	Pld	W	D	L	GF	GA	GD	Pts	Promotion or relegation
1	Queen's Park	36	23	8	5	78	28	+50	54	Promotion to the 1956–57 Division One
2	Ayr United	36	24	3	9	103	55	+48	51	Promotion to the 1956–57 Division One
3	St Johnstone	36	21	7	8	86	45	+41	49	
4	Dumbarton	36	21	5	10	83	62	+21	47	
5	Stenhousemuir	36	20	4	12	82	54	+28	44	
6	Brechin City	36	18	6	12	60	56	+4	42	
7	Cowdenbeath	36	16	7	13	80	85	−5	39	
8	Dundee United	36	12	14	10	78	65	+13	38	
9	Morton	36	15	6	15	71	69	+2	36	
10	Third Lanark	36	16	3	17	80	64	+16	35	
11	Hamilton Academical	36	13	7	16	86	84	+2	33	
12	Stranraer	36	14	5	17	77	92	−15	33	
13	Alloa Athletic	36	12	7	17	67	73	−6	31	
14	Berwick Rangers	36	11	9	16	52	77	−25	31	
15	Forfar Athletic	36	10	9	17	62	75	−13	29	
16	East Stirlingshire	36	9	10	17	66	94	−28	28	
17	Albion Rovers	36	8	11	17	58	82	−24	27	
18	Arbroath	36	10	6	20	47	67	−20	26	
19	Montrose	36	4	3	29	44	133	−89	11	

Source: "1955-1956 Second Division - SPFL Archive". SPFL.
