= List of Queen's Park F.C. international players =

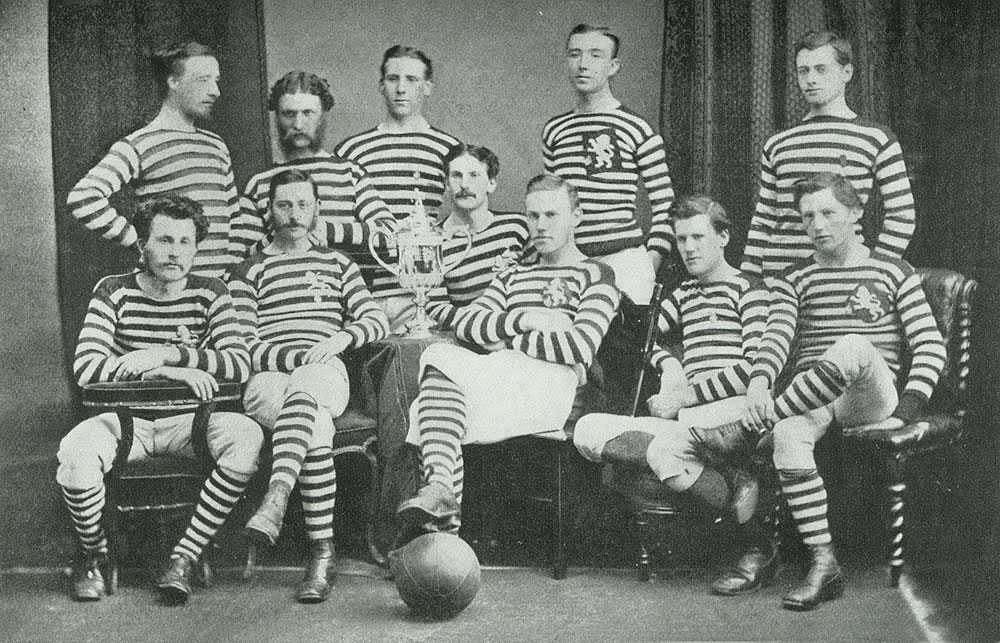
Queen's Park's 1874 team with the Scottish Cup – nine of them also played for Scotland.

Founded in 1867 in Glasgow, Queen's Park F.C. had a pivotal role in the development and expansion of the game of association football in the 19th century. Among other achievements, 76 of the club's players were selected for the Scotland national football team, with 252 appearances in total, between 1872 and 1946 (the majority coming before 1900).

== Background ==
=== 1870s ===
Queen's Park won the first three Scottish Cup competitions in the 1870s, reached the final of the English FA Cup twice in the 1880s and introduced several innovations in playing tactics and stadium procedures. Their contribution to the Scotland national football team was fundamental: all 11 players who appeared for the home side in the 1872 Scotland v England football match were officially representatives of the club (although some are known to have had strong links to other teams). The Spiders provided the majority of the Scotland team for the next two decades, particularly in the most important annual fixture against England. Scotland played without Queen's Park representation for the first time in 1885, but this was an anomaly: the club needed their players for an FA Cup semi-final against Nottingham Forest, and their absence was not felt – the 'weaker' Scotland team defeated Ireland 8–2.

=== 1880s and 1890s ===
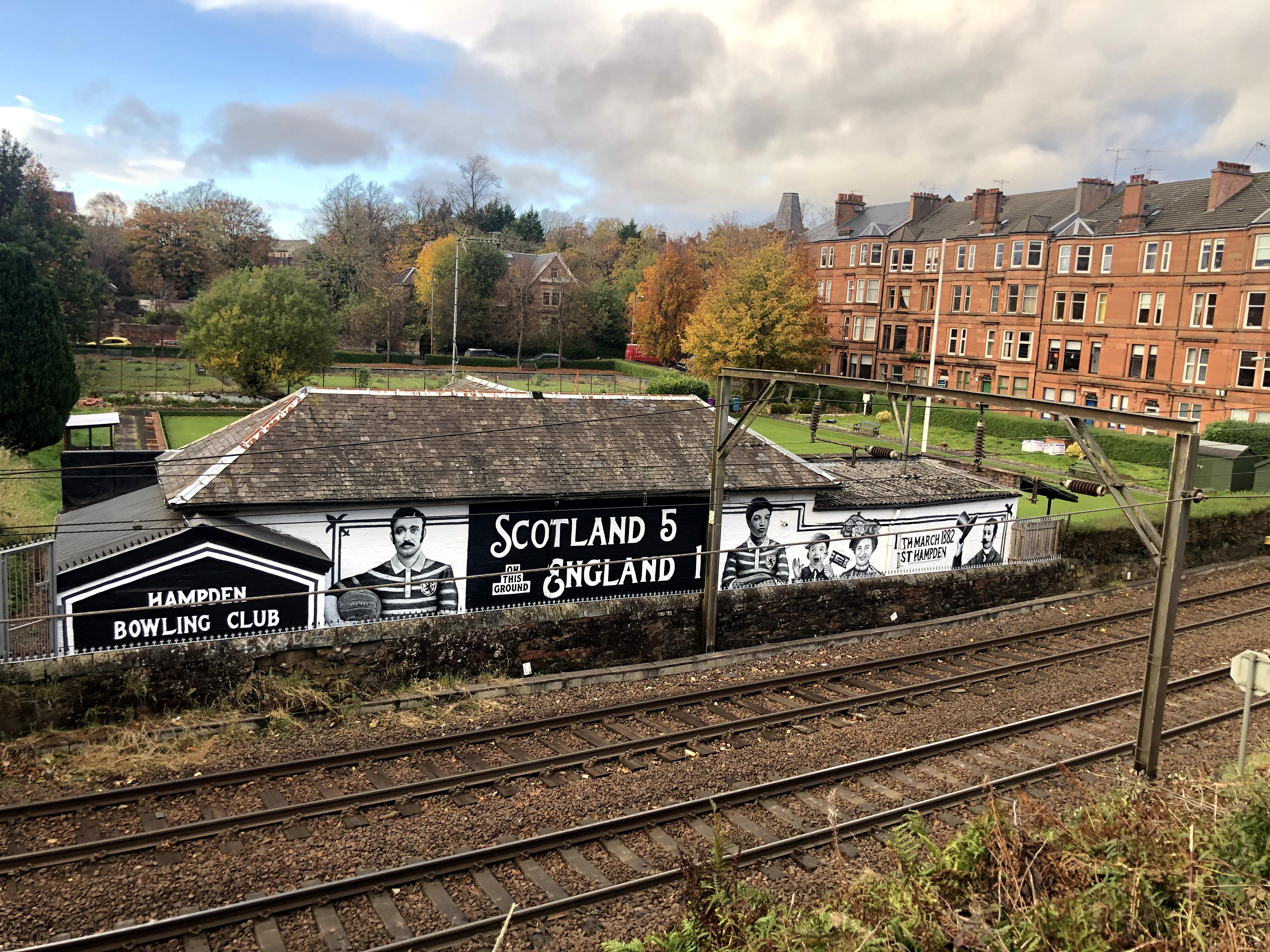
Mural at the site of the first Hampden Park commemorating a 5–1 win for Scotland over England in 1882 – the players featured are Andrew Watson and Charles Campbell, both of Queen's Park (five other men from the club also took part).

As football increased in popularity across Britain, talented Scottish players were regularly enticed to English clubs with unofficial financial inducements, which the Scottish Football Association and its members in general, and the Queen's Park club in particular, railed against, insisting that the sport was to be enjoyed by gentlemen for recreation on an amateur basis. This stance meant that when professionalism was legalised in England in the mid-1880s, Scottish teams withdraw from the FA Cup and the SFA ignored the 'mercenary' Scotch professors employed over the border, selecting only home-based players, a practice which continued even after the introduction of the Scottish Football League in 1890 (two years after England's Football League began); as standard-bearers of the amateur ethos, Queen's Park refused to join the league as they felt it would lead to professionalism among the larger clubs pursuing success which would lead to the demise of smaller provincial teams (also, it has been reported, weakening their own commercial appeal in playing occasional lucrative exhibition matches around the country). In this period the club had its only active international player from outwith Scotland: Humphrey Jones was already captain of the Wales team when he moved to Scotland in 1887 to work as a teacher, and gained his last two caps while registered as a Queen's Park player (he also turned out for East Stirlingshire and for other teams in England and Wales when circumstances allowed, with his amateur status meaning he was not tied to any one club).

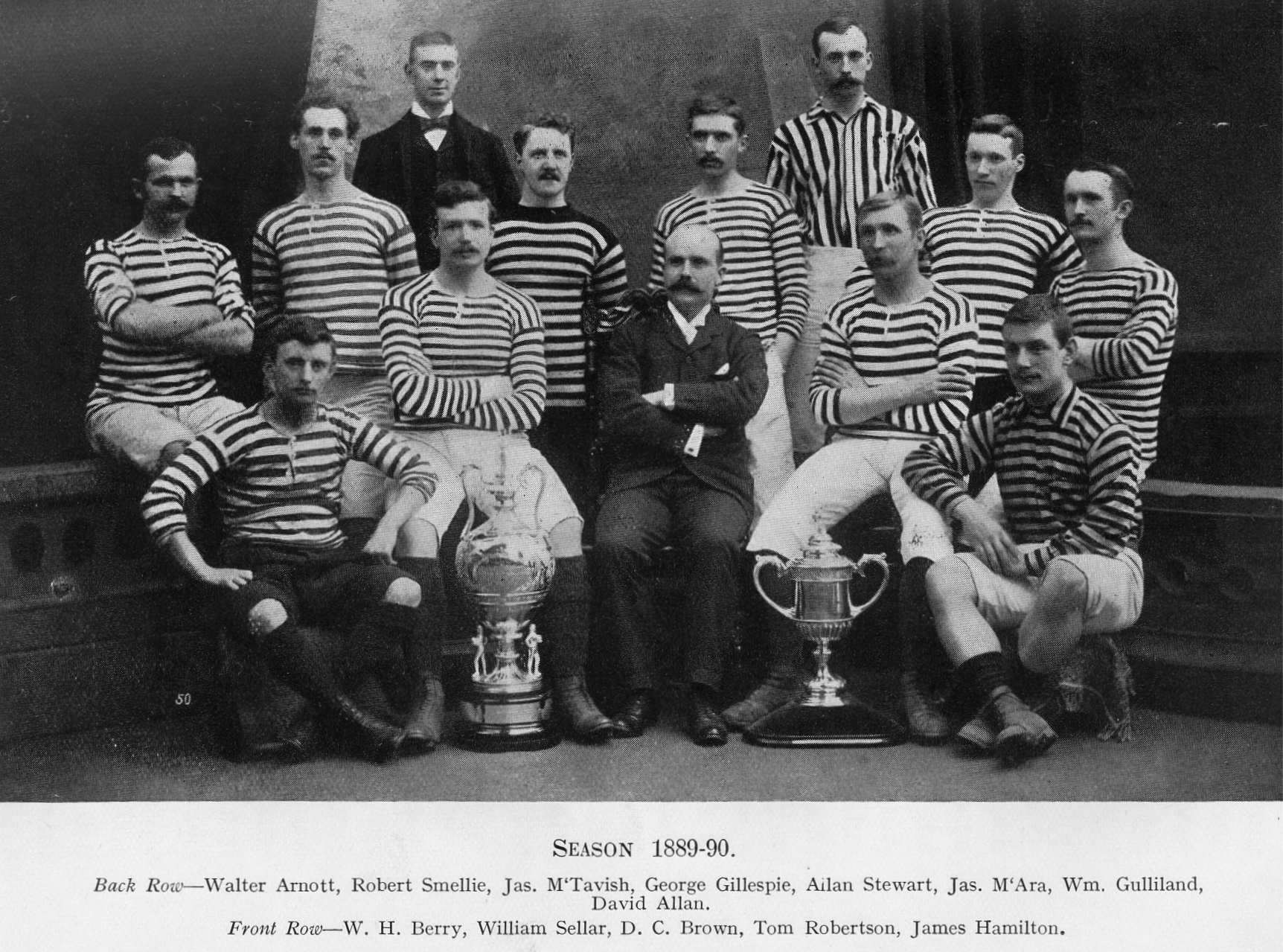
Queen's Park's 1890 team with the Scottish Cup and Glasgow Cup – ten were also internationals.

While the effects of wider professionalism in England were not immediate – Scotland continued to post strong results throughout the first decade of the British Home Championship which began in 1883–84 – gradually the economic and physical benefits of the more organised English system became clear, and with 'shamateurism' already rife in Scotland, professionalism was legalised in the SFL in 1893 and the better-supported clubs, including Queen's Park's city rivals Celtic and Rangers, could now compete with English clubs in recruiting and retaining the best talent. English-based players were admitted to the Scotland team in 1896 to arrest their larger rival's increasing dominance of the Home Championship, and Spiders representatives became increasingly rare.

=== Early 20th century ===
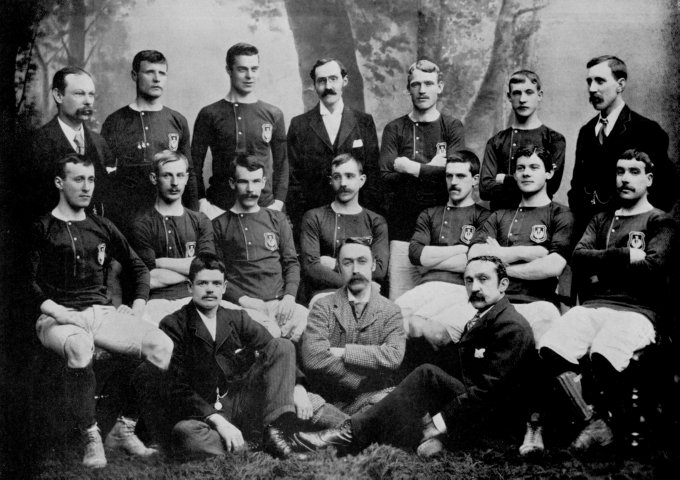
Scotland's team that faced England in 1895, including three Queen's Park players (the last time so many were involved in the fixture).

By the end of the 19th century Queen's Park had been displaced as the country's leading club; the divide in quality with the bigger professional clubs was initially not so wide that they could not still compete to some extent, but they never challenged for the Scottish League championship after belatedly joining the competition in 1900. The 1901–02 season was the first in which no Queen's Park player was involved in any of the three international fixtures, and tellingly the first time that none played in the prestige England match. the Spiders were relegated from the top division in 1922, though quickly regained their place in the top division and held it until 1948, after which they were largely a lower-tier club. With an unremarkable status as a league member, they provided only 14 different players to the Scottish League XI (ranking 16th in this respect), and only 12 of the club's players with over 100 appearances also gained a Scotland cap while at the club, with the vast majority of internationals being from the earlier era when only a small number of official cup fixtures were played each season. Instead, as they battled to compete at a high level with limited resources, the club became the main provider to the Scotland national amateur football team which was active from the 1920s to the 1970s – several of those players also represented Great Britain in Olympic football. In the 1930s, Mustafa Mansour, an Egyptian international goalkeeper, played for Queen's Park after moving to Glasgow to study, but it appears he was not capped during his time at the club.

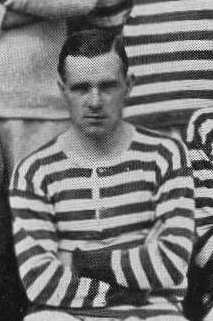
89 goals were scored for Scotland by Queen's Park players, the last by Alan Morton in 1920

Of the club's 76 different internationals (still the fourth-highest ranking club in this regard), only 18 of those men made their debut in the 20th century (eight after the end of the First World War), though an amateur being selected in an environment dominated by professionals is a notable achievement in itself. The final cap gained by a Queen's Park player was for Bobby Brown in 1946, but this itself was an outlier – more regular representation had ended when Bob Gillespie and James Crawford both won their last cap in a win over England in 1933. The final goal was scored by Alan Morton in 1920. 89 goals were scored, 3rd in club ranking overall, and 252 appearances made, 10th overall.

=== Late 20th and early 21st century ===
Despite their diminished status in the game as a result of the commitment to amateurism (a status which was ended in 2019 following a vote by club members), the club has continued to act as a stepping stone to several players who reached international status later in their career, including Sammy Cox, George Herd, Ronnie Simpson, John Little, Bobby Clark, David Holt, Alex Ferguson and Jamie Paton (for Australia) in the late 20th century, and Malky Mackay, Paul Paton (for Northern Ireland), Barry Douglas, Lawrence Shankland, Andy Robertson and Paul McGinn in the early 21st century. The last three played together at Hampden in the fourth tier during the 2012–13 season, with Robertson going on to become the national team captain, as well as gaining the most caps of any former Spiders player (75 as of 2024) and the first club graduate to win the English league championship. Modern-era internationals who played for Queen's Park at youth level include Derek Parlane, Simon Donnelly, Aiden McGeady (93 caps for Ireland) and Steven Saunders.

In women's football which became more organised in the 1990s, Queen's Park were never among the major Scottish clubs although they were a SWPL member before disbanding in 2008, reforming at a local level and eventually returning to the top division in 2024. Detailed records are not widely available before the 2000s, after which Megan Sneddon and Amy McDonald were capped for the national team while registered with the club, while Jen Beattie was selected after moving elsewhere. In the 2020s, Ho Wan Tung featured for Hong Kong.

== List of players ==
Queen's Park F.C. international players (Note: All for Scotland except where stated.)
Player	Ref.	Caps	Goals	First cap (Note: Cap while with Queen's Park, may have had others before or after, as individually noted.)	Last cap
Walter Arnott		14	0	12 March 1883 (Note: 1883: Wales 0–3 Scotland)	1 April 1893 (Note: 1893: England 5–2 Scotland)
Charles Campbell		13	1	7 March 1874 (Note: 1874: Scotland 2–1 England)	27 March 1886 (Note: 1886: Scotland 1–1 England)
Robert Smyth McColl		11 (Note: 13 caps in total)	13 (Note: 13 goals in total)	21 March 1896 (Note: 1896: Scotland 4–0 Wales)	30 March 1901 (Note: 1901: England 2–2 Scotland)
Henry McNeil		10	6	7 March 1874	14 March 1881 (Note: 1881: Wales 1–5 Scotland)
William Lambie (Note: William and John Lambie were brothers.)		9	5	19 March 1892 (Note: 1892: Ireland 1–5 Scotland)	3 April 1897 (Note: 1897: England 1–2 Scotland)
Billy MacKinnon		9	5	30 November 1872 (Note: 1872: Scotland 0–0 England)	5 April 1879 (Note: 1879: England 5–4 Scotland)
Tom Waddell		6	1	28 March 1891 (Note: 1891: Scotland 2–1 Ireland)	6 April 1895 (Note: 1879: England 3–0 Scotland)
Bob Smellie		6	0	19 February 1887 (Note: 1887: Scotland 4–1 Ireland)	1 April 1893
William Anderson		6	3	11 March 1882 (Note: 1882: Scotland 5–1 England)	23 March 1885 (Note: 1885: Wales 1–8 Scotland)
John Kay		6	5	13 March 1880 (Note: 1880: Scotland 5–4 England)	29 March 1884 (Note: 1884: Scotland 4–1 Wales)
Joseph Taylor		6	0	30 November 1872	25 March 1876 (Note: 1876: Scotland 4–0 Wales)
James Crawford		5	0	19 September 1931 (Note: 1931: Scotland 3–1 Ireland)	1 April 1933 (Note: 1933: Scotland 2–1 England)
Donald Sillars		5	0	28 March 1891	23 March 1895 (Note: 1895: Wales 2–2 Scotland)
Eadie Fraser		5	4	27 March 1880 (Note: 1880: Scotland 5–1 Wales)	12 March 1883
George Ker (Note: George and William Ker were brothers.)		5	10	13 March 1880	25 March 1882 (Note: 1882: Scotland 5–0 Wales)
David Davidson		5	1	23 March 1878 (Note: 1878: Scotland 9–0 Wales)	14 March 1881
Robert W. Neill		5	0	25 March 1876	13 March 1880
Robert Gillespie		4	0	30 October 1926 (Note: 1926: Scotland 3–0 Wales)	1 April 1933
William Sellar		4 (Note: 9 caps in total)	4 (Note: 4 goals in total)	4 April 1891 (Note: 1891: England 2–1 Scotland)	1 April 1893
William Gulliland		4	0	21 March 1891 (Note: 1891: Wales 3–4 Scotland)	6 April 1895
William Berry (Note: William and Davidson Berry were brothers.)		4	0	17 March 1888 (Note: 1888: Scotland 0–5 England)	4 April 1891
Alexander Hamilton (Note: Alexander and James Hamilton were brothers.)		4	0	21 March 1885 (Note: 1885: England 1–1 Scotland)	17 March 1888
Thomas Robertson (Note: The Scottish FA website merges the statistics of Tommy Robertson (born 1876) and Thomas Robertson (born 1864) into a single profile.)		4	0	9 March 1889 (Note: 1889: Scotland 7–0 Ireland)	19 March 1892
Thomas Highet		4	1	6 March 1875 (Note: 1875: England 2–2 Scotland)	2 March 1878 (Note: 1878: Scotland 7–2 England)
Jerry Weir		4	2	30 November 1872	23 March 1878
Jack Harkness		3 (Note: 12 caps in total)	0	26 February 1927 (Note: 1927: Ireland 0–2 Scotland)	31 March 1928 (Note: 1928: England 1–5 Scotland)
Harry Paul		3	2	1 March 1909 (Note: 1909: Wales 3–2 Scotland)	3 April 1909 (Note: 1909: England 2–0 Scotland)
Alex Christie		3	1	19 March 1898 (Note: 1898: Scotland 5–2 Wales)	8 April 1899 (Note: 1899: England 2–1 Scotland)
Kenneth Anderson		3	0	28 March 1896 (Note: 1896: Ireland 3–3 Scotland)	2 April 1898 (Note: 1898: Scotland 1–3 England)
Davidson Berry		3	1	24 March 1894 (Note: 1894: Scotland 5–2 Wales)	25 March 1899 (Note: 1899: Scotland 9–1 Ireland)
David Stewart		3	0	18 March 1893 (Note: 1893: Wales 0–8 Scotland)	27 March 1897 (Note: 1897: Scotland 5–1 Ireland)
James Hamilton (Note: The Scottish FA website merges the statistics of James Hamilton (born 1901) and James Hamilton (active in the 1890s) into a single profile.)		3	3	26 March 1892 (Note: 1892: Scotland 6–1 Wales)	1 April 1893
David Allan		3	2	21 March 1885	10 April 1886 (Note: 1886: Scotland 4–1 Wales)
John Smith		3 (Note: 10 caps in total)	4 (Note: 10 goals in total)	10 March 1883 (Note: 1883: England 2–3 Scotland)	15 March 1884 (Note: 1884: Scotland 1–0 England)
Andrew Holm		3	0	25 March 1882	12 March 1883
William Harrower		3	4	11 March 1882	10 April 1886
Andrew Watson		3	0	12 March 1881 (Note: 1881: England 1–6 Scotland)	11 March 1882
James Phillips		3	0	3 March 1877 (Note: 1877: England 1–3 Scotland)	23 March 1878
James J. Thomson		3	0	30 November 1872	7 March 1874
Willie Wiseman		2	0	30 October 1926	22 February 1930 (Note: 1901: Scotland 3–1 Ireland)
Alan Morton		2 (Note: 31 caps in total)	1 (Note: 5 goals in total)	26 February 1920 (Note: 1920: Wales 1–1 Scotland)	13 March 1920 (Note: 1920: Scotland 3–0 Ireland)
George McWattie		2	0	23 February 1901 (Note: 1901: Scotland 11–0 Ireland)	2 March 1901 (Note: 1901: Wales 1–1 Scotland)
William Stewart		2	1	26 March 1898 (Note: 1898: Ireland 0–3 Scotland)	3 March 1900 (Note: 1900: Ireland 0–3 Scotland)
Andrew Baird		2	0	19 March 1892	24 March 1894
Humphrey Jones (Wales)		2 (Note: 14 caps in total.)	0 (Note: 1 goal in total)	7 March 1891 (Note: 1891: England 4–1 Wales)	21 March 1891
Allan Stewart		2	1	24 March 1888 (Note: 1888: Ireland 2–10 Scotland)	15 April 1889 (Note: 1889: Wales 0–0 Scotland)
James Allan		2	2	19 March 1887 (Note: 1887: England 2–3 Scotland)	21 March 1887 (Note: 1887: Wales 0–2 Scotland)
John Lambie		2 (Note: Some sources attribute a cap and goal in 1886 to Lambie, who had to withdraw from the team at short notice but was still included in match reports – his replacement, who scored, was James Kelly.)	0	19 February 1887	17 March 1888
George Gillespie		2 (Note: 7 caps in total)	0	10 April 1886	28 March 1891
William Somers		2 (Note: 3 caps in total)	0	5 April 1879	27 March 1880
James Richmond		2	0	2 March 1878	25 March 1882
Robert Gardner		2 (Note: 5 caps in total)	0	30 November 1872	8 March 1873 (Note: 1873: England 4–2 Scotland)
William Ker		2	0	30 November 1872	8 March 1873
Robert Smith (Note: Robert and James Smith were brothers.)		2	0	30 November 1872	8 March 1873
David Wotherspoon		2	0	30 November 1872	8 March 1873
Bobby Brown		1 (Note: 5 caps in total)	0	23 January 1946 (Note: 1946: Scotland 2–2 Belgium)	
Stewart Chalmers		1	0	23 February 1929 (Note: 1929: Ireland 3–7 Scotland)	
William King		1	0	27 October 1928 (Note: 1928: Scotland 4–2 Wales)	
Peter Pursell		1	0	28 February 1914 (Note: 1914: Scotland 0–0 Wales)	
William Key		1	0	16 March 1907 (Note: 1907: Scotland 3–0 Ireland)	
Thomas Fitchie		1 (Note: 4 caps in total)	0	4 March 1907 (Note: 1907: Wales 1–0 Scotland)	
Andrew Richmond		1	0	3 March 1906 (Note: 1906: Scotland 0–2 Wales)	
Leslie Skene		1	0	12 March 1904 (Note: 1904: Scotland 1–1 Wales)	
James Irons		1	0	3 February 1900 (Note: 1900: Scotland 5–2 Wales)	
David Wilson		1	2	3 February 1900	
John L. Ritchie		1	1	20 March 1897 (Note: 1897: Wales 2–2 Scotland)	
John Cameron		1	0	28 March 1896	
John Gillespie		1	0	21 March 1896	
Willie Watt		1	1	19 February 1887	
George Somerville		1	1	27 March 1886	
John Gow (Note: The Scottish FA website merges the statistics of John Gow (born 1859) and John Gow (born 1869) into a single profile.)		1	0	21 March 1885	
Robert Christie		1	0	15 March 1884	
Archie Rowan		1 (Note: 2 caps in total)	0	25 March 1882	
Angus MacKinnon		1	1	7 March 1874	
Robert Leckie		1	0	30 November 1872	
Alex Rhind		1	0	30 November 1872	
James Smith		1	0	30 November 1872	
