= Scotland national football team results (1872–1914) =

- Win Draw Loss

The Scotland national football team represents Scotland in international association football and is controlled by the Scottish Football Association. It is the joint-oldest national football team in the world, alongside England, Scotland's opponents in what is now recognised as the world's first international football match, which took place at Hamilton Crescent in Glasgow in November 1872. Prior to this, a series of matches had been played between teams representing the two countries, but the Scottish team was drawn almost entirely from players based in and around London and these games are now not regarded as full international matches. The lack of involvement by players from Scottish clubs in these matches led to some controversy, which was resolved when The Football Association arranged to send a team to play in Glasgow, where the English players took on a Scotland team composed entirely of players from the Queen's Park club.

Between 1872 and 1914, when competitive football was interrupted by the First World War, Scotland played 113 international matches, resulting in 70 victories, 23 draws and 20 defeats. This total does not include a match in 1902 which was declared void after a disaster at Ibrox Park in which 25 spectators died. Scotland played an annual friendly against England each year until 1883, and added a regular game against Wales in 1876. These two teams remained Scotland's only opponents until the British Home Championship was instituted in 1884, consisting of a round-robin tournament between England, Scotland, Wales and Ireland. Of the 31 tournaments staged prior to the war, Scotland won 10 outright and 6 jointly. Scotland's 11–0 defeat of Ireland in 1901 is the national team's biggest win, and the 6–1 victory over England at Kennington Oval in 1881 remains the team's biggest win away to fierce rivals England. Scotland's games with England during this period drew extremely large crowds, with five matches prior to the First World War attracting crowds of over 100,000 spectators. The compilers of the World Football Elo Ratings retrospectively consider Scotland to have been ranked at number 1 during much of the early period of international football.

== Key ==
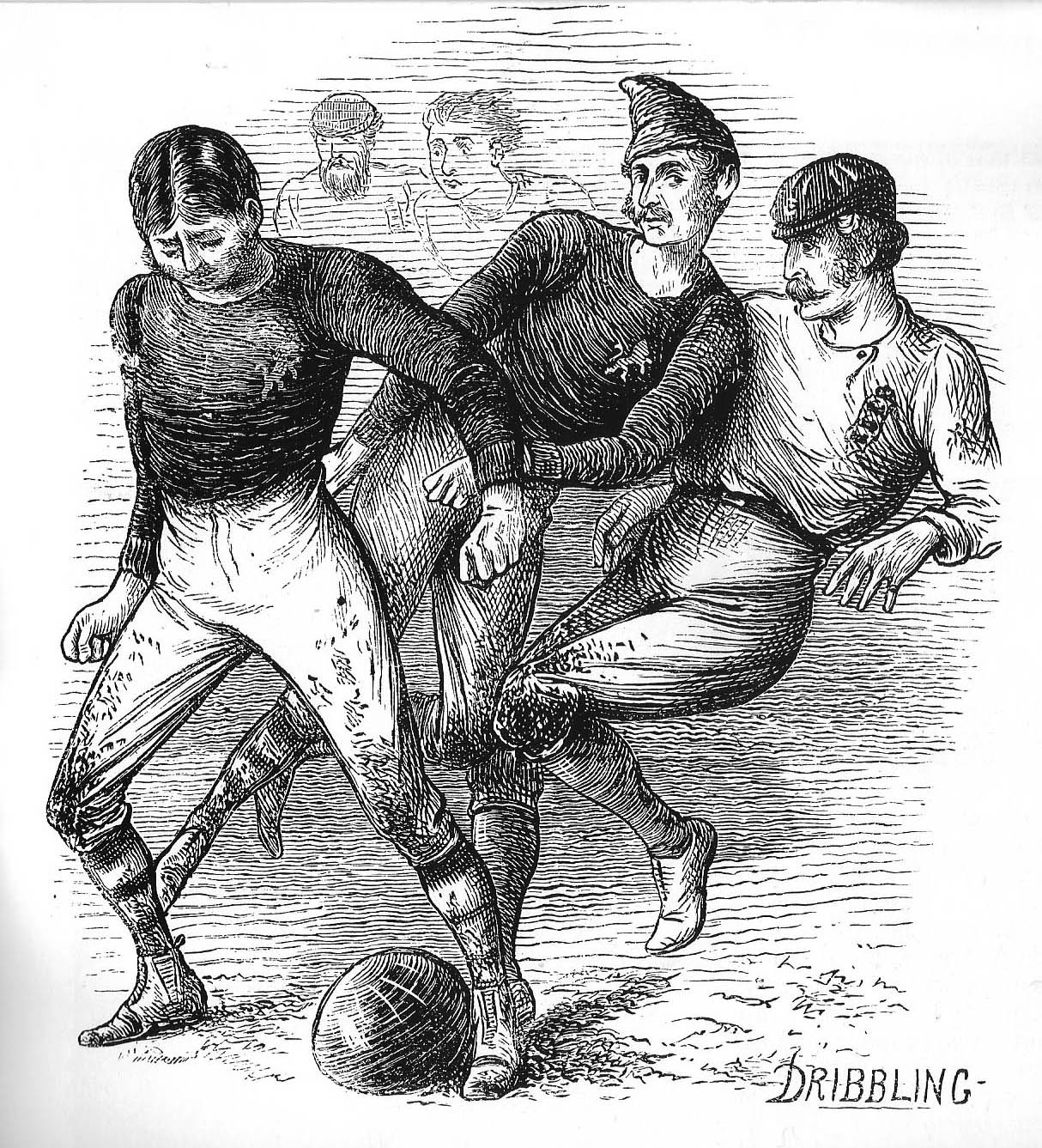
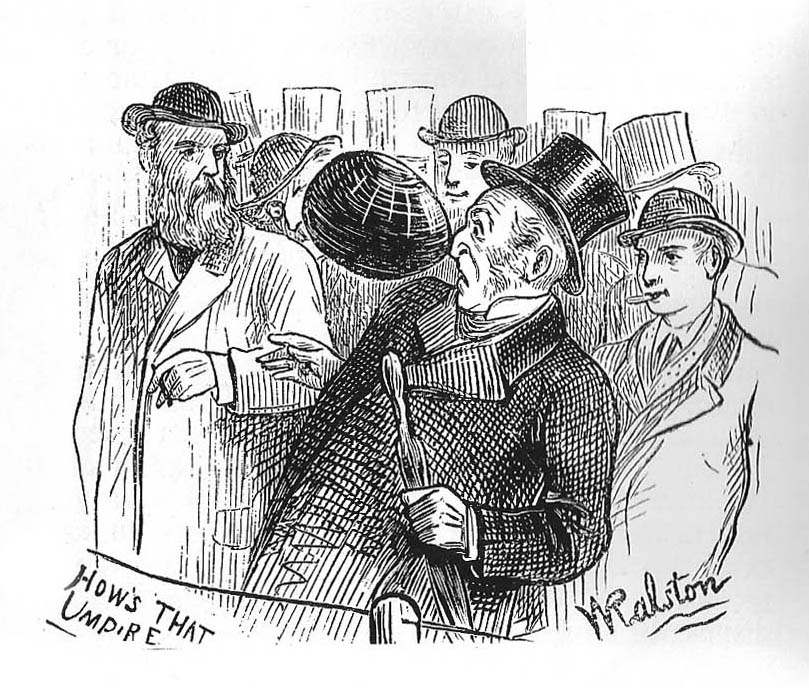
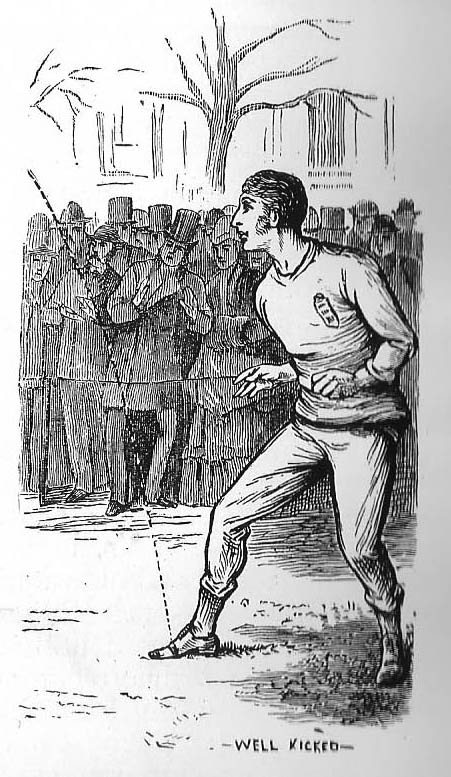
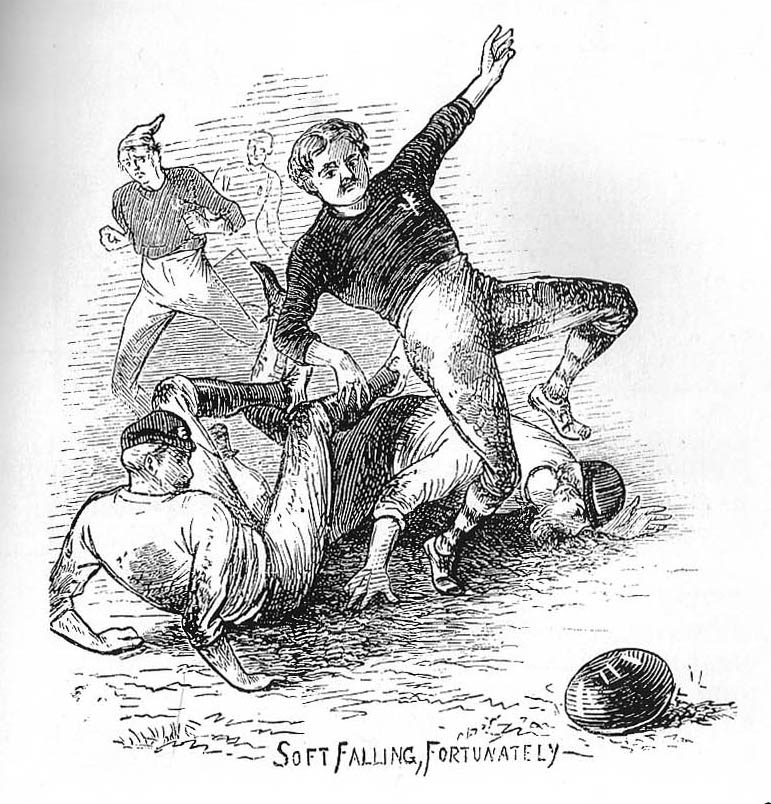
Illustrations of the first international at Hamilton Crescent, by William Ralston

Key to matches

- Att. = Match attendance
- (H) = Home ground
- (A) = Away ground

Key to record by opponent

- P = Games played
- W = Games won
- D = Games drawn
- L = Games lost
- GF = Goals for
- GA = Goals against

== Results ==
Scotland's score is shown first in each case.

Match number	Date	Venue	Opponents	Score	Competition	Scotland scorers	Att.	Ref.
1	30 November 1872	Hamilton Crescent, Partick (H)	England	0–0	Friendly		3,000	
2	8 March 1873	Kennington Oval, Lambeth (A)	England	2–4	Friendly	Henry Renny-Tailyour, William Gibb	3,000	
3	7 March 1874	Hamilton Crescent, Partick (H)	England	2–1	Friendly	Frederick Anderson, Angus MacKinnon	7,000	
4	6 March 1875	Kennington Oval, Lambeth (A)	England	2–2	Friendly	Henry McNeil, Peter Andrews	2,000	
5	4 March 1876	Hamilton Crescent, Partick (H)	England	3–0	Friendly	Billy MacKinnon, Henry McNeil, Thomas Highet	15,000	
6	25 March 1876	Hamilton Crescent, Partick (H)	Wales	4–0	Friendly	John Ferguson, Jimmy Lang, Billy MacKinnon, Henry McNeil	17,000	
7	3 March 1877	Kennington Oval, Lambeth (A)	England	3–1	Friendly	John Ferguson (2), James Richmond	2,000	
8	5 March 1877	Racecourse Ground, Wrexham (A)	Wales	2–0	Friendly	Own goal, Charles Campbell	4,000	
9	2 March 1878	Hampden Park [I], Crosshill (H)	England	7–2	Friendly	John McDougall (3), John McGregor, Henry McNeil (2), Billy MacKinnon	10,000	
10	23 March 1878	Hampden Park [I], Crosshill (H)	Wales	9–0	Friendly	Peter Campbell (2), Jerry Weir (2), John Ferguson (2), John Baird, James Watson, Jimmy Lang	6,000	
11	5 April 1879	Kennington Oval, Lambeth (A)	England	4–5	Friendly	Billy MacKinnon (2), John McDougall, John Smith	4,500	
12	7 April 1879	Racecourse Ground, Wrexham (A)	Wales	3–0	Friendly	John Smith (2), Peter Campbell	2,000	
13	13 March 1880	Hampden Park [I], Crosshill (H)	England	5–4	Friendly	George Ker (3), John Baird, John Kay	12,000	
14	27 March 1880	Hampden Park [I], Crosshill (H)	Wales	5–1	Friendly	David Davidson, William Beveridge, Joseph Lindsay, J. McAdam, John Campbell	2,000	
15	12 March 1881	Kennington Oval, Lambeth (A)	England	6–1	Friendly	John Smith (3), George Ker (2), David Hill	8,500	
16	14 March 1881	Racecourse Ground, Wrexham (A)	Wales	5–1	Friendly	George Ker (2), Henry McNeil, two own goals	1,500	
17	11 March 1882	Hampden Park [I], Crosshill (H)	England	5–1	Friendly	George Ker (2), William Harrower, John Kay, Robert McPherson	10,000	
18	25 March 1882	Hampden Park [I], Crosshill (H)	Wales	5–0	Friendly	Eadie Fraser (2), John Kay, George Ker, James McAulay	5,000	
19	10 March 1883	Bramall Lane, Sheffield (A)	England	3–2	Friendly	John Smith (2), Eadie Fraser	7,000	
20	12 March 1883	Racecourse Ground, Wrexham (A)	Wales	3–0	Friendly	John Smith, Eadie Fraser, William Anderson	2,000	
21	26 January 1884	Ulster Cricket Ground, Belfast (A)	Ireland	5–0	British Home Championship	James Gossland (2), William Harrower (2), John Goudie	2,000	
22	15 March 1884	Cathkin Park [I], Crosshill (H)	England	1–0	British Home Championship	John Smith	10,000	
23	29 March 1884	Cathkin Park [I], Crosshill (H)	Wales	4–1	British Home Championship	John Kay (2), Joseph Lindsay, Francis Shaw	5,000	
24	14 March 1885	Hampden Park [II], Crosshill (H)	Ireland	8–2	British Home Championship	Alexander Higgins (3), Alexander Barbour, W. Lamont, Willie Turner, John Marshall, Robert Calderwood	6,000	
25	21 March 1885	Kennington Oval, Lambeth (A)	England	1–1	British Home Championship	Joseph Lindsay	8,000	
26	23 March 1885	Racecourse Ground, Wrexham (A)	Wales	8–1	British Home Championship	Joseph Lindsay (3), Robert Calderwood (2), William Anderson (2), David Allan	4,000	
27	20 March 1886	Ulster Cricket Ground, Belfast (A)	Ireland	7–2	British Home Championship	Charles Heggie (4), James Kelly, James Gourlay, Michael Dunbar	3,000	
28	27 March 1886	Hampden Park [II], Crosshill (H)	England	1–1	British Home Championship	George Somerville	11,000	
29	10 April 1886	Hampden Park [II], Crosshill (H)	Wales	4–1	British Home Championship	Bob McCormick, James McCall, David Allan, William Harrower	5,500	
30	19 February 1887	Hampden Park [II], Crosshill (H)	Ireland	4–1	British Home Championship	William Watt, Tom Jenkinson, William Johnstone, James Lowe	1,000	
31	19 March 1887	Leamington Road, Blackburn (A)	England	3–2	British Home Championship	James McCall, Leitch Keir, James Allan	12,000	
32	21 March 1887	Racecourse Ground, Wrexham (A)	Wales	2–0	British Home Championship	William Robertson, James Allan	2,000	
33	10 March 1888	Hibernian Park, Edinburgh (H)	Wales	5–1	British Home Championship	Alex Latta (2), William Paul, Neil Munro, Willie Groves	8,000	
34	17 March 1888	Hampden Park [II], Crosshill (H)	England	0–5	British Home Championship		10,000	
35	24 March 1888	Solitude Ground, Belfast (A)	Ireland	10–2	British Home Championship	William Dickson (4), Geordie Dewar, Thomas Breckenridge, Allan Stewart, Neil McCallum, Ralph Aitken, own goal	5,000	
36	9 March 1889	Ibrox Park [I], Govan (H)	Ireland	7–0	British Home Championship	Willie Groves (3), Frank Watt (2), David Black, Tom McInnes	6,000	
37	13 April 1889	Kennington Oval, Lambeth (A)	England	3–2	British Home Championship	Neil Munro, Jimmy Oswald, James McLaren	10,000	
38	15 April 1889	Racecourse Ground, Wrexham (A)	Wales	0–0	British Home Championship		6,000	
39	22 March 1890	Underwood Park, Paisley (H)	Wales	5–0	British Home Championship	William Paul (4), Hughie Wilson	7,500	
40	29 March 1890	Ulster Cricket Ground, Belfast (A)	Ireland	4–1	British Home Championship	Gilbert Rankin (3), Tom Wylie	5,000	
41	5 April 1890	Hampden Park [II], Crosshill (H)	England	1–1	British Home Championship	John McPherson	26,379	
42	21 March 1891	Racecourse Ground, Wrexham (A)	Wales	4–3	British Home Championship	Bob Boyd (2), James Logan, Robert Buchanan	4,000	
43	28 March 1891	Celtic Park [I], Glasgow (H)	Ireland	2–1	British Home Championship	James Low, Tom Waddell	8,000	
44	4 April 1891	Ewood Park, Blackburn (A)	England	1–2	British Home Championship	Frank Watt	31,000	
45	19 March 1892	Solitude Ground, Belfast (A)	Ireland	3–2	British Home Championship	Alexander Keillor, William Lambie, Dave Ellis	10,500	
46	26 March 1892	Tynecastle Park, Edinburgh (H)	Wales	6–1	British Home Championship	James Hamilton (2), John McPherson (2), Davie Baird, William Thomson	600	
47	2 April 1892	Ibrox Park [I], Govan (H)	England	1–4	British Home Championship	Jack Bell	20,000	
48	18 March 1893	Racecourse Ground, Wrexham (A)	Wales	8–0	British Home Championship	Jake Madden (4), John Barker (3), William Lambie	4,500	
49	25 March 1893	Celtic Park, Glasgow (H)	Ireland	6–1	British Home Championship	William Sellar (2), James Kelly, James Hamilton, own goal	12,000	
50	1 April 1893	Athletic Ground, Richmond (A)	England	2–5	British Home Championship	William Sellar (2)	16,000	
51	24 March 1894	Rugby Park, Kilmarnock (H)	Wales	5–2	British Home Championship	Davidson Berry, John Barker, Thomas Chambers, David Alexander, John Johnstone	10,000	
52	31 March 1894	Solitude Ground, Belfast (A)	Ireland	2–1	British Home Championship	Jack Taylor, own goal	6,000	
53	7 April 1894	Celtic Park, Glasgow (H)	England	2–2	British Home Championship	William Lambie, John McPherson	45,017	
54	23 March 1895	Racecourse Ground, Wrexham (A)	Wales	2–2	British Home Championship	Jake Madden, John Divers	4,000	
55	30 March 1895	Celtic Park, Glasgow (H)	Ireland	3–1	British Home Championship	John Walker (2), William Lambie	15,000	
56	6 April 1895	Goodison Park, Liverpool (A)	England	0–3	British Home Championship		42,500	
57	21 March 1896	Carolina Port, Dundee (H)	Wales	4–0	British Home Championship	Robert Neil (2), Alexander Keillor, Daniel Paton	11,700	
58	28 March 1896	Solitude Ground, Belfast (A)	Ireland	3–3	British Home Championship	Robert Smyth McColl (2), Patrick Murray	8,000	
59	4 April 1896	Celtic Park, Glasgow (H)	England	2–1	British Home Championship	William Lambie, Jack Bell	56,500	
60	20 March 1897	Racecourse Ground, Wrexham (A)	Wales	2–2	British Home Championship	John Ritchie, John Walker	5,000	
61	27 March 1897	Ibrox Park [I], Govan (H)	Ireland	5–1	British Home Championship	John McPherson (2), Neil Gibson, Robert Smyth McColl, Alexander King	15,000	
62	3 April 1897	Crystal Palace, London (A)	England	2–1	British Home Championship	Tommy Hyslop, Jimmy Millar	35,000	
63	19 March 1898	Fir Park, Motherwell (H)	Wales	5–2	British Home Championship	James Gillespie (3), James McKee (2)	3,500	
64	26 March 1898	Solitude Ground, Belfast (A)	Ireland	3–0	British Home Championship	Thomas Robertson, Robert Smyth McColl, William Stewart	5,000	
65	2 April 1898	Celtic Park, Glasgow (H)	England	1–3	British Home Championship	Jimmy Millar	40,000	
66	18 March 1899	Racecourse Ground, Wrexham (A)	Wales	6–0	British Home Championship	Robert Smyth McColl (3), John W. Campbell (2), Harry Marshall	12,000	
67	25 March 1899	Celtic Park, Glasgow (H)	Ireland	9–1	British Home Championship	Robert Smyth McColl (3), Robert Hamilton (2), Jack Bell, Davidson Berry, John W. Campbell, Alex Christie	12,000	
68	8 April 1899	Villa Park, Aston (A)	England	1–2	British Home Championship	Robert Hamilton	25,590	
69	3 February 1900	Pittodrie, Aberdeen (H)	Wales	5–2	British Home Championship	Davie Wilson (2), Jack Bell, Alexander Smith, Robert Hamilton	12,500	
70	3 March 1900	Solitude Ground, Belfast (A)	Ireland	3–0	British Home Championship	Alexander Smith, John Campbell (2)	6,000	
71	7 April 1900	Celtic Park, Glasgow (H)	England	4–1	British Home Championship	Robert Smyth McColl (3), Jack Bell	63,000	
72	23 February 1901	Celtic Park, Glasgow (H)	Ireland	11–0	British Home Championship	Sandy McMahon (3), Robert Hamilton (4), John W. Campbell (2), John Campbell, Davie Russell	15,000	
73	2 March 1901	Racecourse Ground, Wrexham (A)	Wales	1–1	British Home Championship	John Robertson	5,000	
74	30 March 1901	Crystal Palace, London (A)	England	2–2	British Home Championship	John Campbell, Robert Hamilton	18,520	
75	1 March 1902	Grosvenor Park, Belfast (A)	Ireland	5–1	British Home Championship	Robert Hamilton (3), Robert Walker, Albert Buick	15,000	
76	15 March 1902	Cappielow Park, Greenock (H)	Wales	5–1	British Home Championship	John Robertson, Albert Buick, Alec Smith, Robert Walker, John Campbell	5,284	
77	3 May 1902	Villa Park, Aston (A)	England	2–2	British Home Championship	Bobby Templeton, Ronald Orr	15,000	^{[A]}
78	9 March 1903	Arms Park, Cardiff (A)	Wales	1–0	British Home Championship	Finlay Speedie	11,000	
79	21 March 1903	Celtic Park, Glasgow (H)	Ireland	0–2	British Home Championship		17,000	
80	4 April 1903	Bramall Lane, Sheffield (A)	England	2–1	British Home Championship	Finlay Speedie, Robert Walker	32,000	
81	12 March 1904	Dens Park, Dundee (H)	Wales	1–1	British Home Championship	Robert Walker	12,000	
82	26 March 1904	Dalymount Park, Dublin (A)	Ireland	1–1	British Home Championship	Robert Hamilton	1,000	
83	9 April 1904	Celtic Park, Glasgow (H)	England	0–1	British Home Championship		45,000	
84	6 March 1905	Racecourse Ground, Wrexham (A)	Wales	1–3	British Home Championship	John Robertson	6,000	
85	18 March 1905	Celtic Park, Glasgow (H)	Ireland	4–0	British Home Championship	Charles Thomson (2 pens.), Bobby Walker, Jimmy Quinn	35,000	
86	1 April 1905	Crystal Palace, London (A)	England	0–1	British Home Championship		32,000	
87	3 March 1906	Tynecastle Park, Edinburgh (H)	Wales	0–2	British Home Championship		25,000	
88	17 March 1906	Dalymount Park, Dublin (A)	Ireland	1–0	British Home Championship	Thomas Fitchie	8,000	
89	7 April 1906	Hampden Park, Glasgow (H)	England	2–1	British Home Championship	James Howie (2)	102,741	
90	4 March 1907	Racecourse Ground, Wrexham (A)	Wales	0–1	British Home Championship		7,715	
91	16 March 1907	Celtic Park, Glasgow (H)	Ireland	3–0	British Home Championship	Frank O'Rourke, Robert Walker, Charles Thomson (pen.)	26,000	
92	6 April 1907	St James' Park, Newcastle (A)	England	1–1	British Home Championship	Own goal	35,829	
93	7 March 1908	Dens Park, Dundee (H)	Wales	2–1	British Home Championship	Alex Bennett, Willie Lennie	18,000	
94	14 March 1908	Dalymount Park, Dublin (A)	Ireland	5–0	British Home Championship	Jimmy Quinn (4), James Galt	10,000	
95	4 April 1908	Hampden Park, Glasgow (H)	England	1–1	British Home Championship	Andrew Wilson	121,452	
96	1 March 1909	Racecourse Ground, Wrexham (A)	Wales	2–3	British Home Championship	Robert Walker, Harold Paul	6,000	
97	15 March 1909	Ibrox Park, Govan (H)	Ireland	5–0	British Home Championship	James McMenemy (2), Sandy MacFarlane, Alexander Thomson, Harold Paul	24,000	
98	3 April 1909	Crystal Palace, London (A)	England	0–2	British Home Championship		27,000	
99	5 March 1910	Rugby Park, Kilmarnock (H)	Wales	1–0	British Home Championship	Archie Devine	22,000	
100	19 March 1910	Windsor Park, Belfast (A)	Ireland	0–1	British Home Championship		17,000	
101	2 April 1910	Hampden Park, Glasgow (H)	England	2–0	British Home Championship	Jimmy McMenemy, Jimmy Quinn	106,205	
102	6 March 1911	Ninian Park, Cardiff (A)	Wales	2–2	British Home Championship	Robert Hamilton (2)	14,000	
103	18 March 1911	Celtic Park, Glasgow (H)	Ireland	2–0	British Home Championship	William Reid, James McMenemy	32,000	
104	1 April 1911	Goodison Park, Liverpool (A)	England	1–1	British Home Championship	Alexander Higgins	38,000	
105	2 March 1912	Tynecastle Park, Edinburgh (H)	Wales	1–0	British Home Championship	James Quinn	32,000	
106	16 March 1912	Windsor Park, Belfast (A)	Ireland	4–1	British Home Championship	Walter Aitkenhead (2), William Reid, Bobby Walker	12,000	
107	23 March 1912	Hampden Park, Glasgow (H)	England	1–1	British Home Championship	Andrew Wilson	127,307	
108	3 March 1913	Racecourse Ground, Wrexham (A)	Wales	0–0	British Home Championship		8,000	
109	15 March 1913	Dalymount Park, Dublin (A)	Ireland	2–1	British Home Championship	William Reid, Alex Bennett	12,000	
110	5 April 1913	Stamford Bridge, Chelsea (A)	England	0–1	British Home Championship		52,500	
111	28 February 1914	Celtic Park, Glasgow (H)	Wales	0–0	British Home Championship		10,000	
112	14 March 1914	Windsor Park, Belfast (A)	Ireland	1–1	British Home Championship	Joseph Donnachie	31,000	
113	14 April 1914	Hampden Park, Glasgow (H)	England	3–1	British Home Championship	Charles Thomson, James McMenemy, William Reid	105,000	

Notes

- A. This match replaced the original England–Scotland game, played at the new Ibrox Park on 5 April, which was declared void after a disaster in which 25 spectators died.

== Record by opponent ==
Team	Pld	W	D	L	GF	GA	GD	WPCT
England	43	18	12	13	85	75	+10	41.86
Ireland	31	26	3	2	128	27	+101	83.87
Wales	39	27	8	4	128	35	+93	69.23
Total	113	71	23	19	341	137	+204	62.83

Source: Results

== British Home Championship record by season ==
Year	Placing
1883–84	1st
1884–85	1st
1885–86	1st (joint)
1886–87	1st
1887–88	2nd
1888–89	1st
1889–90	1st (joint)
1890–91	2nd
1891–92	2nd
1892–93	2nd
1893–94	1st
1894–95	2nd (joint)
1895–96	1st
1896–97	1st
1897–98	2nd
1898–99	2nd
1899–1900	1st
1900–01	2nd
1901–02	1st
1902–03	1st (joint)
1903–04	3rd (joint)
1904–05	3rd (joint)
1905–06	1st (joint)
1906–07	3rd
1907–08	1st (joint)
1908–09	3rd
1909–10	1st
1910–11	2nd
1911–12	1st (joint)
1912–13	2nd (joint)
1913–14	2nd
