= 1850s in association football =

The following are events in the 1850s decade which are relevant to the development of association football. Included are events in closely related codes, such as the Sheffield Rules. All events happened in English football unless specified otherwise.

== Events ==
=== 1857 ===
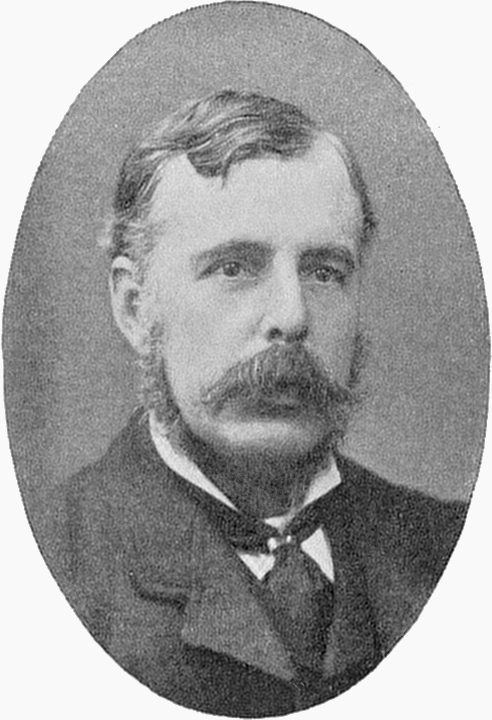
Charles W. Alcock

- 24 October – Foundation of Sheffield FC. The club is officially regarded by the FA and FIFA governing bodies as the world's oldest association football club. It is the oldest documented non-university club in any code of football.

=== 1858 ===
- 28 October – Final approval of the Laws of Sheffield Football Club which became known via several revisions as the Sheffield Rules. Originally created and maintained by Sheffield FC, responsibility for the rules passed to Sheffield & Hallamshire County Football Association upon its creation in 1867. They co-existed with the Football Association (FA) rules from 1863 until 1877 when the two codes were unified. The first version applied strict limits to handling of the ball but did allow the fair catch (earning a free kick). A goal could only be scored by kicking the ball, but not from a free kick. There was no offside rule but there were rules about the throw-in and the goal kick. There was no definition of goal size or structure, and no mention of team numbers. Besides carrying the ball by hand, certain other Rugby School practices were forbidden including hacking and holding opponents.

=== 1859 ===
- Foundation of Wanderers FC by a group of Old Harrovians including Charles W. Alcock. The club was originally called Forest Football Club and changed its name to Wanderers in 1864.

== Births ==
=== Unknown ===
- c.1850 – William Gibb (d. unknown), Scotland international in 1873 who played in the second official international match.
- c.1850 – John Hunter (d. 1891), Scotland international in four matches (1874–1877).
- c.1850 – Sandy Kennedy (d. unknown), Scotland international in six matches (1875–1884).
- c.1855 – David Davidson (d. unknown), Scotland international in five matches (1878–1881).
- c.1855 – John Kay (d. unknown), Scotland international in six matches, scoring five goals (1880–1884).
- c.1855 – George Ker (d. unknown), Scotland international in five matches, scoring ten goals including a hat-trick against England in March 1880 (1880–1882).

=== 1850 ===
- 1 January – Charles Chenery (d. 1928), England international 1872–1874 who played in the first three official international matches; also a county cricketer.
- 13 March – Alfred Goodwyn (d. 1874), England international in 1873 who played in the second official international match; the first international footballer to die.
- 14 March – Francis Birley (d. 1910), England international in 1874 and 1875; a three-time winner of the FA Cup.
- 23 April – Arnold Kirke Smith (d. 1927), England international in 1872 who played in the first official international match.
- 27 May – Charles Morice (d. 1932), England international in 1872 who played in the first official international match.
- 15 June – Charlie Clegg (d. 1937), England international in 1872 who played in the first official international match; later both chairman and president of The Football Association (The FA).
- 19 July – Cuthbert Ottaway (d. 1878), England international in 1872 and 1874 as team captain in the first and third official international matches; also a county cricketer.
- 16 December – Joseph Taylor (d. 1888), Scotland international in 1872 who played in the first official international match and, until 1876, made six international appearances.

=== 1851 ===
- March – Jimmy Lang (d. unknown), Scotland international in two matches, scoring two goals (1876–1878).
- 28 April – P. G. von Donop (d. 1921), England international in 1873 who played in the second official international match and in 1875, made two appearances.
- 30 April – John Blackburn (d. 1927), Scotland international in 1873 who played in the second official international match.
- 7 October – Alexander Bonsor (d. 1907), England international 1873–1875 made two appearances; twice an FA Cup winner with The Wanderers.
- 17 October – Reginald Courtenay Welch (d. 1939), England international in 1872 and 1874 who played in the first and third official international matches; twice an FA Cup winner with The Wanderers.
- 23 November – Jerry Weir (d. 1887), Scotland international in 1872 who played in the first official international match; made four international appearances.
- 25 December – James J. Thomson (d. 1915), Scotland international 1872–1874 who played in the first three official international matches.
- unknown date – John McGregor (d. unknown), Scotland international in four matches (1877–1880).

=== 1852 ===
- 18 January – Billy MacKinnon (d. 1942), Scotland international in 1872 who played in the first official international match and, until 1879, made nine appearances.
- 30 January – Hubert Heron (d. 1914), England international in 1873 who played in the second official international match and, until 1878, made five appearances.
- 21 April – William Clegg (d. 1932), England international in 1873 who played in the second official international match and in 1879 against Wales; brother of Charlie Clegg.
- unknown date – William Ker (d. 1925), Scotland international in 1872–73 who played in the first two official international matches.
- unknown date – Jack Hunter (d. 1903), England international in seven matches from 1878 to 1882; an early professional who was player-coach with Blackburn Olympic when they won the FA Cup in 1883.

=== 1853 ===
- 14 March – Arthur Cursham (d. 1884), England international forward in six matches (1876–1883), scoring two goals.
- 18 March – William Maynard (d. 1921), England international in 1872 who played in the first official international match.
- 3 September – Walpole Vidal (d. 1914), England international in 1873 who played in the second official international match.
- unknown date – Harry McNeil (d. 1924), Scotland international in ten matches, scoring six goals (1874–1881).
- unknown date – Thomas Highet (d. 1907), Scotland international in four matches (1875–1878).
- unknown date – Alex McLintock (d. 1931), Scotland international in three matches (1875–1880).
- unknown date – Robert Neill (d. 1928), Scotland international in five matches (1876–1880).
- unknown date – John McDougall (d. 1925), Scotland international in five matches, scoring four goals (1877–1879).

=== 1854 ===
- 25 January – Segar Bastard (d. 1921), England international in 1880 (one match); also a noted referee.
- 10 March – Alex McGeoch (d. 1922), Scotland international in four matches (1876–1877).
- unknown date – Charles Campbell (d. 1927), Scotland international in 13 matches, as captain in nine (1874–1886).

=== 1855 ===
- 1 June – Walter Buchanan (d. 1926), England international in 1876 (one match); played for Clapham Rovers.
- 4 July – Francis Sparks (d. 1934), England international forward in three matches (1879–1880), scoring three goals.
- 12 August – John Smith (d. 1934), Scotland international in ten matches, scoring ten goals (1877–1884).
- 7 December – Stuart Macrae (d. 1927), England international half-back in six matches (1883–1884).
- unknown date – William Davies (d. 1916), Wales international in four matches (1876–1880) who scored the first-ever goal for Wales.
- unknown date – John McPherson (d. 1934), Scotland international in eight matches (1879–1885).

=== 1856 ===
- 6 March – Horace Barnet (d. 1941), England international in 1882 (one match); played for Royal Engineers.
- 24 May – Andrew Watson (d. 1921), Scotland international in three matches (1881–1882), believed to have been the first black player at international level.
- 27 May – Tom Vallance (d. 1935), Scotland international in seven matches (1877–1881) and an early captain of Rangers.
- 27 July – John Baird (d. 1902), Scotland international in three matches (1876–1880).
- 12 November – Joe Beverley (d. 1897), England international in 1884 (three matches); an early professional player for both Blackburn Olympic and Blackburn Rovers.

=== 1857 ===
- 9 July – Norman Bailey (d. 1923), England international in 19 matches from 1878 to 1887.
- 23 July – Lindsay Bury (d. 1935), England international in two matches from 1877 to 1879.

=== 1858 ===
- 22 March – James Richmond (d. 1898), Scotland international in three matches (1877–1882).
- 30 July – Charles Bambridge (d. 1935), England international in 18 matches (scoring eleven goals) from 1879 to 1887.
- 13 November – Joseph Lindsay (d. 1933), Scotland international in eight matches, scoring six goals (1880–1886).
- 27 November – William Beveridge (d. 1941), Scotland international in three matches (1879–1880).
- unknown date – Alfred Dobson (d. 1932), England international full-back in four matches (1882–1884).
- unknown date – Peter Miller (d. 1914), Scotland international in three matches (1882–1883).

=== 1859 ===
- 2 January – Billy Mosforth (d. 1929), England international in nine matches from 1877 to 1882.
- 14 January – Albemarle Swepstone (d. 1907), England international goalkeeper in six matches (1880–1883).
- 15 March – Arthur Brown (d. 1909), England international in three matches (scoring four goals), all in 1882.
- 9 April – Bob Roberts (d. 1929), England international goalkeeper in three matches (1887–1890).
- 29 April – Rupert Anderson (d. 1944), England international goalkeeper for one match in 1879.
- 6 June – William McKinnon (d. 1899), Scotland international in four matches (1883–1884).
- 22 June – George Gillespie (d. 1900), Scotland international goalkeeper in seven matches (1880–1891).
- 6 October – George Holden (d. 1925), England international forward in four matches (1881–1884).
- 4 November – Andrew Holm (d. unknown), Scotland international in three matches (1882–1883).
- 27 November – Harry Cursham (d. 1941), England international forward in eight matches (1880–1884), scoring five goals.

== Bibliography ==
- Farnsworth, Keith (1995). Sheffield Football: A History. Volume 1, 1857–1961. Sheffield: Hallamshire Press. ISBN 978-1-87-471813-0.
- Murphy, Brendan (2007). From Sheffield with Love. Sports Book Limited. ISBN 978-1-89-980756-7.
- Sanders, Richard (2009). Beastly Fury – The Strange Birth of British Football. London: Transworld. ISBN 978-0-55-381935-9.
- Young, Percy M. (1964). Football in Sheffield. San Francisco: Dark Peak.
