= 1880 Scottish Cup final =

- Event: 1879–80 Scottish Cup
Queen's Park	Thornliebank
3	0
- Date: 21 February 1880
- Venue: Cathkin Park, Crosshill
- Referee: D. Hamilton
- Attendance: c. 8,000

The 1880 Scottish Cup final was the seventh final of the Scottish Cup and the final of the 1879–80 Scottish Cup, the most prestigious knockout football competition in Scotland. The match was played at Cathkin Park in Crosshill (today part of Glasgow) on 21 February 1880 and was watched by a crowd estimated as anything between 5,000 and 8,000 spectators. The final was contested by three-time former champions Queen's Park and Thornliebank who had never won the cup.

== Background ==
Queen's Park reached the final for the fourth time after winning the competition for three consecutive seasons between 1874 and 1876. Prior to the match, both Queen's Park and Vale of Leven had won the Scottish Cup three times, a record at the time.

No team from Renfrewshire had reached the final before Thornliebank in 1880 – their only appearance in the final. The team's previous best run in the competition came in 1877–78 when they lost to Renton in the fifth round.

The match marked the first and only time Queen's Park and Thornliebank met in a competitive fixture.

== Route to the final ==
=== Queen's Park ===
Round	Opposition	Score
First round	Rangers	0–0
First round replay	Rangers	5–1
Second round	19th Lanark RV	14–1
Third round	Partick	5–1
Fourth round	Strathblane	10–1
Fifth round	Hurlford	15–1
Quarter-final	bye	
Semi-final	Dumbarton	1–0

=== Thornliebank ===
Round	Opposition	Score
First round	Yoker	4–0
Second round	17th Renfrew RV	6–1
Third round	Barrhead Rangers	1–0
Fourth round	Possilpark	12–0
Fifth round	Rob Roy	12–0
Quarter-final	3rd Lanark RV	1–1
Quarter-final replay	3rd Lanark RV	2–1
Semi-final	Pollokshields Athletic	2–1

== Match details ==
21 February 1880
3.35pm

Queen's Park	3–0	Thornliebank
"scrimmage" 35'; Ker 45'; Highet 88'	Report

Cathkin Park, Crosshill
Attendance: c. 8,000
Referee: D. Hamilton

=== Report ===
Although Thornliebank was the holder of the Renfrewshire Cup, the match did not generate as much excitement as in previous years, as the result was considered a foregone conclusion; Queen's Park being "superior in all points to their opponents". Rain falling all day also spoilt the play and kept the crowd down to a few thousand; also many spectators watched from outside the ground to avoid paying "fancy prices" (1 shilling for admittance, 2 shillings for the grandstand). The ground cut up quickly in the rain, which ought to have been some help to the Model Villagers, who favoured a less scientific long ball style; however Queen's Park won the toss and played with the benefit of a strong breeze in the first half, and Queen's Park had the first chance, Cadden saving a "terrific shot" from Ker with his legs. The favourites kept up the pressure throughout the first half, occasional relief coming from long clearances by Wham, but the Thornliebank forwards "were unable to cope with the opposition", so could never retain possession for any meaningful time.

The pressure told after 35 minutes, a Neill corner being scrimmaged over the line. After two more saves from Cadden, Queen's Park doubled its lead on the stroke of half-time, a "very hard shot" from Ker deflecting in off a defender, an appeal against an earlier foul not finding any sympathy from the officials. The second half repeated the pattern of the first, with Queen's putting pressure on that was only occasionally relieved; as the match went on, Thornliebank did begin to create more chances, but its two best efforts were spoilt by T. Brannan's erratic shooting. The game was put beyond doubt in the 88th minute, after Weir nodded a Richmond cross down to Highet, who "sent it through the posts".

QUEEN'S PARK:
GK	(Scotland) John D. Graham
RB	(Scotland) William Somers
LB	(Scotland) Robert W. Neill
RH	(Scotland) Charles Campbell
LH	(Scotland) David Davidson
RW	(Scotland) James Richmond
RW	(Scotland) Jerry Weir
CF	(Scotland) Thomas Highet
CF	(Scotland) George Ker
LW	(Scotland) John Kay
LW	(Scotland) Henry McNeil (c)

THORNLIEBANK:
GK	(Scotland) J. Cadden
FB	(Scotland) J. Jamieson
FB	(Scotland) W. Marshall
HB	(Scotland) A. Henderson
HB	(Scotland) Bill McFettridge
FW	(Scotland) A. Clark
FW	(Scotland) A. Brannan
FW	(Scotland) W. Anderson (c)
CF	(Scotland) D. Wham
FW	(Scotland) T. Brannan
FW	(Scotland) A. S. Hutton
