= 1882 Scottish Cup final =

- Event: 1881–82 Scottish Cup
Queen's Park	Dumbarton
2	2
- Date: 18 March 1882
- Venue: Cathkin Park, Crosshill
- Attendance: 12,000

Replay
Queen's Park	Dumbarton
4	1
- Date: 1 April 1882
- Venue: Cathkin Park, Crosshill
- Attendance: 15,000

The 1882 Scottish Cup final was the ninth final of the Scottish Cup and the final of the 1881–82 Scottish Cup, the most prestigious knockout football competition in Scotland. The original match - which ended in a 2–2 draw - was played at the original Cathkin Park in Crosshill (today part of Glasgow) on 18 March 1882 and was watched by a crowd of 12,000 spectators. For the second season in succession, the final was contested by defending champions Queen's Park and Dumbarton.

The replay took place at the same venue on 1 April 1882 in front of 15,000 spectators. Queen's Park won the competition for the sixth time after they beat Dumbarton 4–1.

== Background ==
Two-time defending champions Queen's Park had reached the final on five previous occasions and had gone on to win the competition each time – including the last two consecutively. Prior to the final, Queen's Park's total of five Scottish Cup wins was a record and both Queen's Park and Vale of Leven had won the cup three times in-a-row.

Dumbarton reached the final for the second consecutive season becoming the first runner-up to reach the final in the following season. Only Queen's Park and Vale of Leven had previously reached the final in consecutive seasons.

This was the first time that the two finalists from the previous season had would meet in the next final. Queen's Park had won both previous Scottish Cup meetings between the two teams – the 1880 semi-final and the 1881 final.

== Route to the final ==
=== Queen's Park ===
Round	Opposition	Score
First round	Caledonian	9–0
Second round	Cowlairs	2–2
Second round replay	Cowlairs	9–0
Third round	bye	
Fourth round	Johnstone	3–2
Fifth round	Partick Thistle	10–0
Quarter-final	Shotts	15–0
Semi-final	Kilmarnock Athletic	3–2

=== Dumbarton ===
Round	Opposition	Score
First round	Alclutha	9–1
Second round	Vale of Leven	2–0
Third round	Jamestown	5–0
Fourth round	bye	
Fifth round	Hibernian	6–2 (match void)
Fifth round replay	Hibernian	6–2
Quarter-final	Rangers	2–1 (match void)
Quarter-final replay	Rangers	5–1
Semi-final	Cartvale	11–2

Notes

1. A-Hibernian successfully protested the outcome of the match and a replay was ordered.
2. B-Rangers protested that the match hadn't been played for 90 minutes. The protested was upheld and a replay was ordered.

== Match details ==
=== Original ===
18 March 1882
15:00

Queen's Park	2–2	Dumbarton
Harrower	Report	Brown; Meikleham

Cathkin Park, Crosshill
Attendance: 12,000

QUEEN'S PARK:
GK	Archie Rowan (Note: The Queen's Park players were known for using pseudonyms at the time. Rowan listed himself as "A. McCallum".)
RB	Andrew Watson
LB	Andrew H. Holm
HB	David Davidson
HB	John W. Holm
RW	William Anderson
RW	Eadie Fraser
CF	William Harrower
CF	George Ker
LW	James T. Richmond
LW	John Kay
For the replay, Charles Campbell replaced John Holm.

DUMBARTON:
GK	John Kennedy
RB	Jock Hutcheson
LB	Michael Paton
RH	Peter Miller
LH	William McKinnon
RW	James Meikleham
RW	Robert S. Brown
CF	Joseph Lindsay
CF	James McAulay
LW	Andrew Kennedy
LW	James Miller
For the replay, W. Watt replaced McKinnon.

=== Replay ===
1 April 1882
15:00

Queen's Park	4–1	Dumbarton
Ker; Harrower; Richmond; Kay	Report	Miller

Cathkin Park, Crosshill
Attendance: 15,000
