= 1881–82 in Scottish football =

Football in Scotland
- Season: 1881–82

1881–82 in Scottish football

Scottish Cup winners
- Queen's Park

The 1881–82 season was the ninth season of competitive football in Scotland.

== Honours ==
=== Cup honours ===
==== National ====
Competition	Winner	Score	Runner-up
Scottish Cup	Queen's Park	4 – 1 (Note: Replay needed.)	Dumbarton

==== County ====
After Hibernian won the Edinburgh FA Cup on three successive seasons, they were awarded it outright, and a new trophy, the East of Scotland Shield would in future be played for by Edinburgh clubs.

Competition	Winner	Score	Runner-up
Ayrshire Cup	Kilmarnock Portland	4 – 0	Kilmarnock
Buteshire Cup	Millport	1 – 0	Bute Rangers
East of Scotland Shield	Hibernian	4 – 2	St Bernard's
Lanarkshire Cup	Hamilton	4 – 3	Cambuslang
Renfrewshire Cup	Arthurlie	2 – 0	Cartvale

==== Other ====
Competition	Winner	Score	Runner-up
Glasgow Charity Cup	Vale of Leven	1 – 0	Dumbarton

== Teams in F.A. Cup ==
Season	Club	Round	Score	Result
1881–82	Queen's Park	1st round	(England) Accrington	Withdrew

== Scotland national team ==
Date	Venue	Opponents	Score (Note: Scotland's score is shown first.)	Competition	Scotland scorers
11 March 1882	Hampden Park, Glasgow	England	5 – 1	Friendly	George Ker (2), William Harrower, John Kay, Robert McPherson
25 March 1882	Hampden Park, Glasgow	Wales	5 – 0	Friendly	Eadie Fraser (2), John Kay, George Ker, James McAulay
