= 1880–81 in Scottish football =

Football in Scotland
- Season: 1880–81

1880–81 in Scottish football

Scottish Cup winners
- Queen's Park

The 1880–81 season was the eighth season of competitive football in Scotland.

== Honours ==
=== Cup honours ===
==== National ====
Competition	Winner	Score	Runner-up
Scottish Cup	Queen's Park	3 – 1	Dumbarton

==== County ====
Competition	Winner	Score	Runner-up
Ayrshire Cup	Lugar Boswell	5 – 0	Annbank
Buteshire Cup	Bute Rangers	1 – 0	St Blane's
Edinburgh FA Cup	Hibernian	1 – 0 (Note: Replay needed.)	St Bernard's
Lanarkshire Cup	Thistle	3 – 2	Shotts
Renfrewshire Cup	Arthurlie	3 – 1	St Mirren

==== Other ====
Competition	Winner	Score	Runner-up
Glasgow Charity Cup	Queen's Park	3–1	Rangers

== Teams in F.A. Cup ==
Season	Club	Round	Score	Result
1880–81	Queen's Park	1st round	(England) Sheffield Wednesday	Withdrew

== Scotland national team ==
Date	Venue	Opponents	Score (Note: Scotland's score is shown first.)	Competition	Scotland scorers
12 March 1881	Kennington Oval, London	England	6–1	Friendly	John Smith (3), George Ker (2), David Hill
14 March 1881	Acton Park, Wrexham	Wales	5–1	Friendly	George Ker (2), Henry McNeil, two own goals
