= BigSoccer =

Internet forum

- Website type: Internet forum
- Owner: Big Internet Group LLC
- Creator: Jesse Hertzberg
- Revenue: undisclosed
- Website: http://www.bigsoccer.com/
- Registration: 150,000
- Launched: 2000
- Current status: Active

BigSoccer.com is a soccer-related Internet forum in the United States. The site has more than 150,000 registered users and had over 1.2 million unique visitors during the 2006 FIFA World Cup. Forty percent of the site's traffic comes from outside the United States, with the site having particular popularity in Canada, Mexico, United Kingdom, Australia and Germany.

== History ==
=== First years ===
Founded by Jesse Hertzberg as personal hobby in 1995 with Ethan Beard joining in 1997, the site was originally located at www.inch.com/~huss and was created in the wake of the 1994 FIFA World Cup in the United States and in anticipation of the launch of Major League Soccer (which eventually was delayed from 1995 to 1996). The site was used to post links to MLS and US Soccer related news, with a particular focus on his local MLS team in New York (soon to be announced as the MetroStars, now known as the New York Red Bulls).

In the beginning, a significant number of BigSoccer posters came from the North American Soccer (NAS) listserv. In the early to mid-90s, the NAS list was one of the best sources of information and one of the few opportunities for community for supporters of the United States men's national soccer team. With the advent of MLS, the NAS list soon sprouted listservs for many of the teams in the new league as well. As the "bulletin board" technology advanced, the listservs soon faded away.

The site evolved in two directions, becoming two distinct sites, MetroFan.com and SoccerBoards.com (which evolved into the current BigSoccer.com). While MetroFan continued to focus on the local MLS squad and eventually evolved into MetroFanatic.com, SoccerBoards invited other MLS fan clubs to join an interactive forum where they could share news, gossip, opinions, etc. about their local MLS side, the league, and US Soccer, as well other soccer teams and leagues around the world.

=== Recent years ===
SoccerBoards continued to be a hobby for its founders until 2000, when, with financial backing from StarMedia Network, the business was renamed BigSoccer and became a full-time endeavor. The company acquired Matchday USA, a soccer magazine and online retailer, later that year. Though the magazine was subsequently shut down, the retail operations have grown substantially and today the BigSoccer Shop, in partnership with 365 and Eurosport, carries over 10,000 products from dozens of countries and hundreds of teams.

In addition to NAS, many smaller online soccer communities migrated to BigSoccer. These include Soccer America Graffiti.

=== Impact in American soccer ===
BigSoccer, described by Richard Deitsch of SI.com as "arguably the nerve center of American soccer", is read by prominent members of the American soccer community, including players, officials and coaches, as well as members of the media.

Former Chicago Fire general manager Peter Wilt regularly used the site to communicate with the club's supporters, and D.C. United senior vice president Stephen Zack does the same. Former US national team head coach Bruce Arena, who was introduced to BigSoccer by his successor Bob Bradley, said the site "helps me with some reports from Guatemala. I can find out more about their team over the Internet than just about any other way." And in October 2006, Major League Soccer commissioner Don Garber invited BigSoccer readers to submit questions, and his answers, whose subjects ranged from the league's marketing strategy to expansion, were posted on the site.

== Partnerships ==
- In 2003, BigSoccer partnered with News Corporation's Fox Sports World to become the network's official online community provider. The relationship was terminated in 2004.
- In August 2006, BigSoccer launched a partnership with Major League Soccer, to become the official supplier of online community tools to the league's and teams' official websites.

== Awards ==
In 2022, BigSoccer users elected the best players in history, annually from 1870 until 2021 via a panel consensus. The awards were dubbed as a revisited Ballon d'Or. Criteria were:

- A player's performances (individual and collective) duringa calendar year, his record of achievements
- Class (talent and fair play)
- Career and charisma

Results are as below:
Source: Consensus

=== 1870s ===
- 1870: (Scotland) Arthur Kinnaird
- 1871: (England) Charles W. Alcock
- 1872: (England) Charles W. Alcock (2)
- 1873: (Scotland) Arthur Kinnaird (2)
- 1874: (Scotland) Jerry Weir
- 1875: (Scotland) Harry McNeil
- 1886: (Scotland) Billy MacKinnon
- 1877: (Scotland) Jerry Weir (2)
- 1878: (Scotland) Harry McNeil (2)
- 1879: (England) Norman Bailey

=== 1880s ===
- 1880: (Scotland) George Ker
- 1881: (Scotland) George Ker (2)
- 1882: (Scotland) Andrew Watson
- 1883: (Scotland) Andrew Holm
- 1884: (Scotland) Walter Arnott
- 1885: (England) Nevill Cobbold
- 1886: (Scotland) Nick Ross
- 1887: (Scotland) Archie Hunter
- 1888: (Scotland) Nick Ross (2)
- 1889: (Scotland) Jack Gordon

=== 1890s ===
- 1890: (Scotland) Jimmy Ross
- 1891: (England) Edgar Chadwick
- 1892: (England) Billy Bassett
- 1893: (Scotland) John Campbell
- 1894: (England) John Reynolds
- 1895: (Scotland) John Campbell (2)
- 1896: (England) Gilbert Oswald Smith
- 1897: (England) Ernest Needham
- 1898: (England) Ernest Needham (2)
- 1899: (Scotland) Robert Hamilton

=== 1900s ===
- 1900: (Scotland) Alexander Smith
- 1901: (Scotland) Bobby Walker
- 1902: (Scotland) Ned Doig
- 1903: (Scotland) Bobby Walker (2)
- 1904: (Wales) Billy Meredith
- 1905: (Wales) Billy Meredith
- 1906: (Scotland) Alex Raisbeck
- 1907: (Wales) Billy Meredith
- 1908: (Wales) Billy Meredith
- 1909: (Wales) Billy Meredith (5)

=== 1910s ===
- 1910: (Scotland) Jimmy McMenemy
- 1911: (England) Charlie Roberts
- 1912: (England) Bob Crompton
- 1913: (England) George Holley
- 1914: (Scotland) Jimmy McMenemy (2)
- 1915: (Republic of Ireland) Patsy Gallacher
- 1916: (Republic of Ireland) Patsy Gallacher (2)
- 1917: (Hungary) Imre Schlosser
- 1918: (Hungary) Alfred Schaffer
- 1919: (Hungary) Alfred Schaffer (2)

=== 1920s ===
- 1920: (Hungary) Gyorgy Orth
- 1921: (Hungary) Gyorgy Orth (2)
- 1922: (Argentina) Manuel Seoane
- 1923: (Scotland) Alan Morton
- 1924: (Uruguay) Jose Leandro Andrade
- 1925: (Uruguay) Hector Scarone
- 1926: (Scotland) Alex Jackson
- 1927: (Czech Republic) Karel Pesek
- 1928: (England) Dixie Dean
- 1929: (Scotland) Alan Morton (2)

=== 1930s ===
- 1930: (Italy) Giuseppe Meazza
- 1931: (Italy) Raimundo Orsi
- 1932: (Austria) Matthias Sindelar
- 1933: (Austria) Matthias Sindelar (2)
- 1934: (Italy) Giuseppe Meazza
- 1935: (Hungary) Gyorgy Sarosi
- 1936: (Italy) Giuseppe Meazza (3)
- 1937: (Hungary) Gyorgy Sarosi
- 1938: (Hungary) Gyorgy Sarosi (3)
- 1939: (Paraguay) Arsenio Erico

=== 1940s ===
- 1940: (Brazil) Leonidas
- 1941: (Argentina) Jose Manuel Moreno
- 1942: (Argentina) Jose Manuel Moreno (2)
- 1943: (Brazil) Zizinho
- 1944: (Brazil) Zizinho (2)
- 1945: (Argentina) Rinaldo Martino
- 1946: (Argentina) Adolfo Pedernera
- 1947: (Italy) Valentino Mazzola
- 1948: (England) Stanley Matthews
- 1949: (Brazil) Ademir de Menezes

=== 1950s ===
- 1950: (Brazil) Ademir de Menezes (2)
- 1951: (Sweden) Gunnar Nordahl
- 1952: (Hungary) Ferenc Puskas
- 1953: (Hungary) Ferenc Puskas
- 1954: (Hungary) Sandor Kocsis
- 1955: (Argentina) Alfredo Di Stefano
- 1956: (Argentina) Alfredo Di Stefano
- 1957: (Argentina) Alfredo Di Stefano
- 1958: (Brazil) Pele
- 1959: (Argentina) Alfredo Di Stefano (4)

=== 1960s ===
- 1960: (Hungary) Ferenc Puskas (3)
- 1961: (Brazil) Pele
- 1962: (Brazil) Garrincha
- 1963: (Brazil) Pele
- 1964: (Brazil) Pele
- 1965: (Brazil) Pele
- 1966: (Portugal) Eusebio
- 1967: (Hungary) Florian Albert
- 1968: (Northern Ireland) George Best
- 1969: (Italy) Gianni Rivera

=== 1970s ===
- 1970: (Brazil) Pele (6)
- 1971: (Netherlands) Johan Cruyff
- 1972: (Netherlands) Johan Cruyff
- 1973: (Netherlands) Johan Cruyff
- 1974: (Netherlands) Johan Cruyff (4)
- 1975: (Soviet Union) Oleg Blokhin
- 1976: (Germany) Franz Beckenbauer
- 1977: (England) Kevin Keegan
- 1978: (Argentina) Mario Kempes
- 1979: (Argentina) Diego Maradona

=== 1980s ===
- 1980: (Argentina) Diego Maradona
- 1981: (Brazil) Zico
- 1982: (Brazil) Zico (2)
- 1983: (France) Michel Platini
- 1984: (France) Michel Platini
- 1985: (France) Michel Platini (3)
- 1986: (Argentina) Diego Maradona
- 1987: (Argentina) Diego Maradona (4)
- 1988: (Netherlands) Ruud Gullit
- 1989: (Netherlands) Marco van Basten

=== 1990s ===
- 1990: (Germany) Lothar Matthaus
- 1991: (France) Jean-Pierre Papin
- 1992: (Netherlands) Marco van Basten (2)
- 1993: (Italy) Roberto Baggio
- 1994: (Brazil) Romario
- 1995: (Finland) Jari Litmanen
- 1996: (Germany) Matthias Sammer
- 1997: (Brazil) Ronaldo
- 1998: (France) Zinedine Zidane
- 1999: (Brazil) Rivaldo

=== 2000s ===
- 2000: (France) Zinedine Zidane
- 2001: (Portugal) Luis Figo
- 2002: (France) Zinedine Zidane (3)
- 2003: (France) Thierry Henry
- 2004: (France) Thierry Henry (2)
- 2005: (Brazil) Ronaldinho
- 2006: (Brazil) Ronaldinho (2)
- 2007: (Brazil) Kaká
- 2008: (Portugal) Cristiano Ronaldo
- 2009: (Argentina) Lionel Messi

=== 2010s ===
- 2010: (Argentina) Lionel Messi
- 2011: (Argentina) Lionel Messi
- 2012: (Argentina) Lionel Messi
- 2013: (Portugal) Cristiano Ronaldo
- 2014: (Portugal) Cristiano Ronaldo
- 2015: (Argentina) Lionel Messi
- 2016: (Portugal) Cristiano Ronaldo
- 2017: (Portugal) Cristiano Ronaldo
- 2018: (Portugal) Cristiano Ronaldo (6)
- 2019: (Argentina) Lionel Messi

=== 2020s ===
- 2020: (Poland) Robert Lewandowski
- 2021: (Argentina) Lionel Messi (7)
- 2022: (France) Karim Benzema
- 2023: (Norway) Erling Haaland
- 2024: (Brazil) Vinicius Jr
- 2025:

=== Wins by player ===
Players with multiple wins.

| Player | Winner | Top5 |
|---|---|---|
| (Argentina) Lionel Messi | 7 | 16 |
| (Portugal) Cristiano Ronaldo | 6 | 14 |
| (Brazil) Pele | 6 | 10 |
| (Wales) Billy Meredith | 5 | 6 |
| (Spain) Alfredo Di Stéfano | 4 | 9 |
| (Argentina) Diego Maradona | 4 | 9 |
| (Netherlands) Johan Cruyff | 4 | 9 |
| (Italy) Giuseppe Meazza | 3 | 6 |
| (Hungary) Gyorgy Sarosi | 3 | 5 |
| (France) Michel Platini | 3 | 7 |
| (Hungary) Ferenc Puskas | 3 | 9 |
| (France) Zinedine Zidane | 3 | 7 |
| (Brazil) Ronaldinho | 2 | 3 |
| (Brazil) Zico | 2 | 8 |
| (Hungary) Gyorgy Orth | 2 | 4 |
| (France) Thierry Henry | 2 | 3 |
| (Scotland) Alan Morton | 2 | 6 |
| (Hungary) Alfred Schaffer | 2 | 3 |
| (Austria) Matthias Sindelar | 2 | 6 |
| (Brazil) Zizinho | 2 | 4 |
| (Brazil) Ademir de Menezes | 2 | 2 |
| (Netherlands) Marco van Basten | 2 | 4 |
| (Republic of Ireland) Patsy Gallacher | 2 | 4 |
| (England) Charles W. Alcock | 2 | 3 |
| (Scotland) Arthur Kinnaird | 2 | 4 |
| (Scotland) Jerry Weir | 2 | 4 |
| (Scotland) Harry McNeil | 2 | 6 |
| (Scotland) George Ker | 2 | 3 |
| (Argentina) Jose Manuel Moreno | 2 | 4 |
| (Scotland) Nick Ross | 2 | 5 |
| (Scotland) John Campbell | 2 | 4 |
| (England) Ernest Needham | 2 | 5 |
| (Scotland) Bobby Walker | 2 | 4 |
| (Scotland) Jimmy McMenemy | 2 | 5 |
