= 1881 Scottish Cup final =

- Event: 1880–81 Scottish Cup
| Queen's Park | Dumbarton |
| 2 | 1 |
- Replay ordered after Dumbarton protested over spectators encroaching onto the pitch
- Date: 26 March 1881
- Venue: Kinning Park sports ground, Kinning Park
- Attendance: 15,000

Replay
| Queen's Park | Dumbarton |
| 3 | 1 |
- Date: 9 April 1881
- Venue: Kinning Park sports ground, Kinning Park
- Attendance: 10,000

The 1881 Scottish Cup final was the eighth final of the Scottish Cup and the final of the 1880–81 Scottish Cup, the most prestigious knockout football competition in Scotland. The original match was played at Kinning Park sports ground in the burgh of Kinning Park (today part of Glasgow) on 26 March 1881 and was watched by a crowd of 15,000 spectators. The final was contested by defending champions Queen's Park and Dumbarton.

The result of the original match - a 2–1 win for Queen's Park - was declared void after Dumbarton protested about spectators on the pitch during the game and a replay was ordered. Queen's Park had also threatened to withdraw from the SFA. The gates had to be closed during the replay.

The replay took place at the same venue on 9 April 1881 in front of 10,000 spectators. Queen's Park won the competition for the fifth time after they beat Dumbarton 3–1 in a match which saw Dr John Smith score the first Scottish Cup final hat-trick.

== Background ==
Defending champions Queen's Park had reached the final on four previous occasions and had gone on to lift the trophy each time. Of those four finals, only the 1876 final required a replay. Prior to the final, Queen's Park's total of four Scottish Cup wins was a record and the most goals scored by a single player in a Scottish Cup final match was two by Queen's Park's Thomas Highet in the 1876 replay.

Dumbarton were one of only three teams to have competed in each of the first eight editions of the Scottish Cup not to have reached the final before, the others being Alexandra Athletic and Kilmarnock. They had previously reached the semi-finals on three occasions: in 1874–75 when they lost to Renton after a replay; 1875–76 when they lost to 3rd Lanark RV after a second replay and 1879–80 when they lost to eventual winners Queen's Park.

The previous season's semi-final, which Queen's Park won 1–0, was the only previous meeting between the teams.

== Route to the final ==
=== Queen's Park ===
| Round | Opposition | Score |
|---|---|---|
| First round | John Elder | 7–0 |
| Second round | Possilpark | 5–0 |
| Third round | Pilgrims | 8–1 |
| Fourth round | Beith | 11–2 |
| Fifth round | Mauchline | 2–0 |
| Quarter-final | Campsie Central | 10–1 |
| Semi-final | bye | |

=== Dumbarton ===
| Round | Opposition | Score |
|---|---|---|
| First round | Helensburgh Victoria | 7–0 |
| Second round | Jamestown | 2–1 |
| Third round | Falkirk | 7–1 |
| Fourth round | Glasgow University | 9–0 |
| Fifth round | St Mirren | 5–1 |
| Quarter-final | Rangers | 3–1 |
| Semi-final | Vale of Leven | 2–0 |

== Match details ==
=== Original ===
26 March 1881
15:00

| Queen's Park | 2–1 (Void) | Dumbarton |
|---|---|---|
| | Report |

Kinning Park sports ground, Kinning Park
Attendance: 15,000

Queen's Park:
| GK | Archie Rowan (Note: The Queen's Park players were known for using pseudonyms at the time. Rowan listed himself as "A. McCallum" while Campbell used "C. Elliott", as was the case for the replay.) |
| RB | Andrew Watson |
| LB | Andrew Holm |
| RH | Charles Campbell |
| LH | David Davidson |
| RW | William Anderson |
| RW | Eadie Fraser |
| CF | George Ker |
| CF | John Smith |
| LW | Henry McNeil (c) |
| LW | John Kay |
For the replay, David Allan replaced McNeil.

Dumbarton:
| GK | John Kennedy |
| RB | Jock Hutcheson |
| LB | Michael Paton |
| HB | Peter Miller |
| HB | J. Anderson |
| RW | James Meikleham |
| RW | Robert S. Brown |
| CF | Joe Lindsay |
| CF | James McAulay |
| LW | Andrew Kennedy |
| LW | William McKinnon |
Team unchanged for replay.

=== Replay ===
9 April 1881
15:00

| Queen's Park | 3–1 | Dumbarton |
|---|---|---|
| Smith | Report | Meikleham |

Kinning Park sports ground, Kinning Park
Attendance: 10,000
