= 1882–83 in Scottish football =

Football in Scotland
- Season: 1882–83

1882–83 in Scottish football

Scottish Cup winners
- Dumbarton

The 1882–83 season was the tenth season of competitive football in Scotland, United Kingdom. This season saw the introduction of the latest in the series of regional competitions with the inaugural playing of the Fife Cup.

== Honours ==
=== Cup honours ===
==== National ====
Competition	Winner	Score	Runner-up
Scottish Cup	Dumbarton	2 – 1 (Note: Replay needed.)	Vale of Leven

==== County ====
Competition	Winner	Score	Runner-up
Ayrshire Cup	Kilmarnock Athletic	3 – 2	Lugar Boswell
Buteshire Cup	Bute Rangers	3 – 1	Cumbrae
East of Scotland Shield	Edinburgh University	w.o. (Note: Match awarded as a Walkover.)	Hibernian
Fife Cup	Dunfermline Athletic	4 – 1	Cowdenbeath
Lanarkshire Cup	West Benhar	4 – 1	Royal Albert
Renfrewshire Cup	St Mirren	3 – 1	Thornliebank

==== Other ====
Competition	Winner	Score	Runner-up
Glasgow Charity Cup	Queen's Park	4–1	Rangers

== Teams in F.A. Cup ==
Season	Club	Round	Score	Result
1882–83	Queen's Park	1st round	(England) Grimsby Town	Withdrew

== Scotland national team ==
Date	Venue	Opponents	Score (Note: Scotland's score is shown first.)	Competition	Scotland scorers
10 March 1883	Brammall Lane, Sheffield	England	3–2	Friendly	John Smith (2), Eadie Fraser
12 March 1883	Acton Park, Wrexham	Wales	3–0	Friendly	John Smith, Eadie Fraser, William Anderson
