= 1881–82 Morton F.C. season =

Morton
1881–82 season
- Scottish Cup: First round (lost to Levern)

The 1881–82 season was Morton Football Club's fifth season in which they competed at a national level, entering the Scottish Cup.

== Fixtures and results ==
Win Draw Loss Postponed

=== Scottish Cup ===
| 10 September 1881 First Round | Levern | 4 – 2 | Morton | Wellington Park |
| | ,,, | | , |

=== Renfrewshire Cup ===
| 15 October 1881 First Round | Morton | 3 – 4 | Johnstone | Cappielow Park |
| | ,, | | ,,, |

=== Greenock & District Charity Cup ===
| 1 January 1882 First Round | Morton | 19 – 2 | Victoria 2nd | Cappielow Park |
| | ,,,,,,,,,,,,,,, | | , |

| 28 January 1882 Second Round | Morton | 5 – 1 | Aldergrove | Cappielow Park |
| | Roberts; Simpson; Barr, | | Clark |

| 4 March 1882 Third Round | Morton | 4 – 0 | Greenock Southern | Cappielow Park |
| | ,,, |

| 8 April 1882 Semi Final | Port Glasgow Athletic | 2 – 3 | Morton | Devol Farm |
| | , | | ,, |

| 29 April 1882 Final | Morton | 9 – 3 | Morton 2nd | Cappielow Park |
| | Gillespie; Fleming; Roberts,,,,, | | ,, |

=== Friendlies ===
| 17 September 1881 Friendly | Morton | 7 – 0 | Kilbarchan | Cappielow Park |
| | ,,,,,, |

| 24 September 1881 Friendly | Morton | 2 – 3 | Clyde | Cappielow Park |
| | , | | ,, |

| 29 October 1881 Friendly | Morton | 1 – 1 | Rangers Swifts | Cappielow Park |
| | Goal | | Goal |

| 29 October 1881 Friendly | Morton | 3 – 3 | Kilbirnie | Cappielow Park |
| | Fleming, | | ,, |

| 19 November 1881 Friendly | Morton | 1 – 3 | Abercorn | Cappielow Park |
| | Goal | | ,, |

| 10 December 1881 Friendly | Port Glasgow Athletic | 1 – 3 | Morton | Devol Farm |
| | Goal | | ,, |

| 21 January 1882 Friendly | Morton | 6 – 0 | Port Glasgow Athletic | Cappielow Park |
| | ,,,,, |

| 18 February 1882 Friendly | Morton | 2 – 0 | Thistle | Cappielow Park |
| | , |

| 11 March 1882 Friendly | Morton | 18 – 2 | Glasgow Deaf & Dumb | Cappielow Park |
| | ,,,,,,,,,,,,,, | | , |

| 25 March 1882 Friendly | Morton | 3 – 3 | Thornliebank | Cappielow Park |
| | ,, | | ,, |

| 1 April 1882 Friendly | Morton | 6 – 1 | Possil Park | Cappielow Park |
| | ,,,,, | | Goal |

| 22 April 1882 Friendly | Morton | 2 – 1 | Kilbirnie | Cappielow Park |
| | , | | Goal |
