= Humphrey Jones =

Welsh footballer

Personal information
- Full name: Humphrey Percy Jones
- Date of birth: 7 December 1862
- Place of birth: Bangor, Wales
- Date of death: 10 June 1946 (aged 83)
- Place of death: Gateshead, England
- Positions: Wing half; centre half

Senior career*
Years	Team	Apps	(Gls)
- Friars School
- Bangor
- Swifts
1887–1889	Queen's Park		
1889–1890	East Stirlingshire		
1890–1892	Queen's Park		

International career
1885–1891	Wales	14	(1)
- * Club domestic league appearances and goals

Humphrey Percy Jones (7 December 1862 – 10 June 1946) was a Welsh footballer who played for Bangor, Swifts, East Stirlingshire, Queen's Park and the Wales national football team.

Jones was born in Bangor and played football the Friars School before moving to play with Bangor F.C. After moving to Bangor, Jones earned his first international cap for Wales in 1885 against England in the British Home Championship. Jones left Bangor to play for Swifts and then moved to Scotland to become a schoolmaster (at Blairlodge School, Polmont) where he played for East Stirlingshire and Queen's Park, also featuring for Corinthian on a regular basis. He made a single appearance for Everton in 1890.

Jones won 14 caps and scored one goal^{[note 1]} for the Wales national football team between 1885 and 1891. He was the team captain for 13 of these matches, including on his debut.

Jones was one of several Welsh international footballers chosen to referee international matches during the 19th century. He refereed the decisive match of the 1895–96 British Home Championship between Scotland and England.

== International appearances ==
Year	Opponent
1885	England, Ireland, Scotland
1886	England, Ireland, Scotland
1887	England
1889	England, Ireland
1890	England, Scotland, Ireland
1891	England, Scotland

== See also ==
- List of Wales international footballers (alphabetical)
- List of Queen's Park F.C. international players

== Notes ==
^1. Humphrey Jones is named as the scorer of one goal in an 8–2 win against Ireland in 1885 in some sources. Other sources name Frederick Robert Jones as the scorer.
