= Willie Watt (footballer, born 1861) =

Scottish footballer

Personal information
- Full name: William Wilson Watt
- Date of birth: 17 December 1861
- Place of birth: Glasgow, Scotland
- Positions: Winger; centre forward

Senior career*
Years	Team	Apps	(Gls)
1884–1888	Queen's Park		

International career
1887	Scotland	1	(1)
- * Club domestic league appearances and goals

William Wilson Watt (born 17 December 1861) was a Scottish footballer who played as a winger and centre forward.

== Career ==
Born in Glasgow, Watt played club football for Queen's Park, and made one appearance for Scotland in 1887, scoring one goal. He played in the final of the English FA Cup with Queen's Park in 1884 (as well as being a member of the squad that claimed the Scottish Cup in the same year, though no final was played), and won the Glasgow Merchants Charity Cup a year later.
