= Robert Gillespie (Scottish footballer) =

Scottish footballer

Personal information
- Full name: Robert Gillespie
- Date of birth: 3 December 1900
- Place of birth: Strathbungo, Scotland
- Date of death: 11 August 1960 (aged 59)
- Place of death: Cathcart, Scotland
- Position: Centre half

Senior career*
Years	Team	Apps	(Gls)
–1919	Battlefield Juniors		
1919–1933	Queen's Park	428	(74)

International career
1922	Scottish League XI	1	(0)
1926–1933	Scotland	4	(0)
1926–1933	Scotland Amateurs	11	(0)
- * Club domestic league appearances and goals

Robert Gillespie (3 December 1900 – 11 August 1960) was a Scottish amateur footballer who made over 420 appearances as a centre half in the Scottish League for Queen's Park. After his retirement as a player, he served the club as secretary, committeeman and president until May 1957. Gillespie was capped by Scotland at full and amateur level and represented the Scottish League XI.

== See also ==
- List of one-club men in association football
- List of Scotland national football team captains
