= William King (footballer) =

Scottish footballer

Personal information
- Full name: William Walter Stewart King
- Date of birth: 1 February 1898
- Place of birth: Glasgow, Scotland
- Date of death: 10 March 1962 (aged 64)
- Position: Wing half

Senior career*
Years	Team	Apps	(Gls)
1920–1931	Queen's Park	187	(7)

International career
1928	Scotland	1	(0)
1929–1930	Scotland Amateurs	5	(0)
- * Club domestic league appearances and goals

William Walter Stewart King (1 February 1898 – 10 March 1962) was a Scottish amateur footballer who played as a wing half in the Scottish League for Queen's Park. He represented Scotland as a full and amateur international.
