= 1884 Scottish Cup final =

- Event: 1883–84 Scottish Cup
| Queen's Park | Vale of Leven |
| – | – |
- Vale of Leven did not appear for the final in protest and the cup was awarded to Queen's Park
- Date: 23 February 1884
- Venue: Cathkin Park, Crosshill

The 1884 Scottish Cup Final was scheduled to be the 11th final of the Scottish Cup and the final of the 1883–84 Scottish Cup, the most prestigious knockout football competition in Scotland. Six-time winners Queen's Park were due to face three-time winners Vale of Leven at Cathkin Park in Crosshill (today part of Glasgow) on 23 February 1884.

Following a bereavement, illness and injury, Vale of Leven requested that the match be postponed but this was refused by the SFA. In protest, Vale of Leven did not appear for the final. A subsequent meeting of an SFA committee narrowly decided to award the cup to Queen's Park rather than reorganising the final.

== Background ==
Queen's Park had reached the final on six previous occasions and had gone on to lift the trophy each time, most recently in 1882.

Runners-up in 1883, Vale of Leven reached the final for the second season in succession. This was their fifth appearance in the final and they had previously won the competition three times consecutively between 1877 and 1879.

Prior to the final, Queen's Park and Vale of Leven were the most successful teams in the competition having lifted the trophy in nine of the previous 10 seasons between them. However, they had only met twice previously in the competition. Queen's Park won 2–1 on their way to winning the trophy in 1875–76 before Vale of Leven recorded a 2–1 on their way to winning the cup the following season.

== Route to the final ==
=== Queen's Park ===
| Round | Opposition | Score |
|---|---|---|
| First round | Partick | 8–0 |
| Second round | 3rd Lanark RV | 4–2 |
| Third round | Cowlairs | 5–0 |
| Fourth round | Partick Thistle | 4–0 |
| Fifth round | bye | |
| Quarter-final | Cartvale | 6–1 |
| Semi-final | Hibernian | 5–1 |

=== Vale of Leven ===
| Round | Opposition | Score |
|---|---|---|
| First round | Levendale | 12–0 |
| Second round | bye | |
| Third round | Renton | 4–1 |
| Fourth round | Dundee Harp | 6–0 |
| Fifth round | Arthurlie | 0–0 |
| Fifth round replay | Arthurlie | 3–1 |
| Quarter-final | Pollokshields Athletic | 4–2 |
| Semi-final | Rangers | 3–0 |

== Match details ==
As a result of a bereavement, illness and injury, three of Vale of Leven's players were set to miss the final. As "to play without these members of the team would mean certain defeat", Vale appealed to the SFA on the Wednesday before the final to have the match postponed but this was refused. The club then asked opponents Queen's Park to agree to a postponement but failed to notify them of their situation. With no reason to postpone the game and an upcoming FA Cup final, Queen's Park refused and the game was expected to go ahead as planned.

After Vale failed to appear for the final, an SFA committee was tasked with deciding what should happen next. Chaired by the president of the SFA - a Queen's Park man - the committee decided by seven votes to six to award the cup to Queen's Park rather than reorganising the match. Following the decision, there were reports in the press that the SFA should be renamed the "Queen’s Park and Rangers Association" because of a perceived Glasgow bias.

23 February 1884

| Queen's Park | w/o | Vale of Leven |
