= Robert McPherson (footballer) =

Scottish footballer

Personal information
- Date of birth: c. 1850
- Position: Left winger

Senior career*
Years	Team	Apps	(Gls)
- Arthurlie

International career
1882	Scotland	1	(1)
- * Club domestic league appearances and goals

Robert McPherson (born c. 1850) was a Scottish footballer who played as a left winger.

== Career ==
McPherson played club football for Arthurlie, and he became their first ever international player when he made his sole appearance for Scotland in 1882.
