= Andrew Holm =

Scottish footballer

Personal information
- Full name: Andrew Hair Holm
- Date of birth: 4 November 1859
- Place of birth: Glasgow, Scotland
- Date of death: 8 January 1934 (aged 74)
- Place of death: Giffnock, Scotland
- Position: Full-back

Youth career
- Shaftesbury

Senior career*
Years	Team	Apps	(Gls)
–	Ayr Thistle		
1879–1884	Queen's Park		

International career
1882–1883	Scotland	3	(0)
- * Club domestic league appearances and goals

Andrew Hair Holm (4 November 1859 – 8 January 1934) was a Scottish footballer who played for Queen's Park and Scotland.

He won the Scottish Cup in 1881, 1882 and 1884 (the latter a walkover) and was selected for the Glasgow select team in addition to three international caps, but quit the game aged 24 to pursue business interests – he worked as a distiller, and became a director of the company which produced White Horse whisky.

His elder brother John also played for Queen's Park, as well as for Corinthian in England.

== See also ==
- List of Scotland national football team captains
