= William Anderson (Scottish footballer) =

Scottish footballer

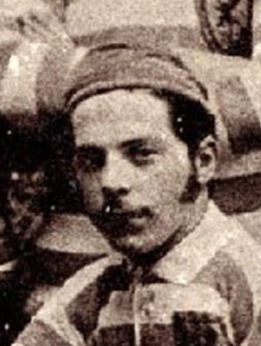
- Anderson in Scotland kit, 1882

Personal information
- Full name: William Anderson
- Date of birth: 25 April 1862
- Place of birth: Glasgow, Scotland
- Date of death: Unknown
- Position: Outside forward

Youth career
- Shawlands Athletic

Senior career*
Years	Team	Apps	(Gls)
1879–1885	Queen's Park		

International career
1882–1885	Scotland	6	(3 (Note: The SFA website and London Hearts website credit Robert Calderwood with two goals against Wales; Andy Mitchell's book and John Litster's files assign the first of these to Anderson, which would make him the fifth player to score an international hat-trick for Scotland (his three being completed before those by Joseph Lindsay in the same match).))
- * Club domestic league appearances and goals

William Anderson (born 25 April 1862) was a Scottish footballer who played as a right winger. He played club football for Queen's Park and appeared in the sides that won the Scottish Cup in 1881, 1882 and 1884, and finished as runners-up in the English FA Cup in 1884 and 1885.

He made his international debut for Scotland on 11 March 1882 and went on to play six matches in the next three years, never ending on the losing side. In his final appearance in the 1884–85 British Home Championship on 23 March 1885, he scored twice in an 8–1 win over Wales.

He worked in the insurance industry, and moved to England after living in the United States for several years (where he played for the Chicago Thistles).
