= William Ker (footballer) =

Scottish footballer

Personal information
- Date of birth: 21 March 1852
- Place of birth: Edinburgh, Scotland
- Date of death: 3 December 1925 (aged 73)
- Place of death: Washington, D.C., United States
- Position: Left back

Senior career*
Years	Team	Apps	(Gls)
- Queen's Park

International career
1872–73	Scotland	2	(0)
- * Club domestic league appearances and goals

William Ker (21 March 1852 – 3 December 1925) was a Scottish footballer, who played in the first ever international football match for Scotland against England in 1872.

Ker also played for Scotland against England the following year. He played for Scottish amateur club Queen's Park. His younger brother, George Ker, was also a Scotland international footballer.

He was the son of the renowned physicist Rev John Kerr, discoverer of the Kerr effect and revised the spelling of his surname as a young man to Ker. He emigrated to Canada in 1873 and later lived in Pennsylvania, Washington and finally Washington, D.C., where he died.
