= William Beveridge (footballer) =

Scottish footballer and track & field athlete

William Wightman Beveridge (27 November 1858 – 26 January 1941) was a Scottish footballer and track and field athlete.

A Scottish athletics sprint champion born in Cumnock, Ayrshire, and educated at Ayr Academy, Beveridge was capped three times by the Scotland national football team between 1879 and 1880 while studying at the University of Glasgow and playing for Glasgow University F.C. He scored one international goal – against Wales in March 1880. He later moved to the University of Edinburgh to study divinity.

In 1883 he was ordained as a Church of Scotland minister. He lived and worked in Port Glasgow until his retirement in 1927. Beveridge was an ardent supporter of the Temperance movement in Scotland and published a pamphlet, 'The athlete and alcohol: a message to young men', now held in New College Library (Special Collections) Edinburgh University.
