= William Somers =

Scottish footballer

William Somers (22 November 1853 - 9 July 1891) was a Scottish international footballer who played as a right back.

Born 1853, he started his career with Glasgow Eastern before moving to Third Lanark in 1877. The side reached the 1878 Scottish Cup Final, but were beaten 1–0 by Vale of Leven. In 1879, Somers transferred to Queen's Park where he won the Scottish Cup in 1880.

He made three appearances for the Scotland national football team, two while playing for Third Lanark in 1879 and the third while with Queen's Park in 1880.

== Death ==
Somers died on 9 July 1891 at the age of 38.
