= James McAulay =

Scottish footballer

Personal information
- Full name: James McAulay
- Date of birth: 28 August 1860
- Place of birth: Bonhill, Dunbartonshire, Scotland
- Date of death: 13 January 1943 (aged 82)

Youth career
- Albion (Dumbarton)

Senior career*
Years	Team	Apps	(Gls)
1880–1887	Dumbarton		

International career
1882–1887	Scotland	9	(1)
- * Club domestic league appearances and goals

James McAulay (28 August 1860 – 13 January 1943) was a Scottish footballer.

== Career ==
McAulay played for Dumbarton and Scotland.

== Honours ==
Dumbarton

- Scottish Cup: Winners 1882–83 - Runners Up 1886–87
- Dumbartonshire Cup: Winners 1884–85
- Glasgow Charity Cup: Runners-Up 1881–82;1884–85
- 9 caps for Scotland between 1881 and 1887, scoring 1 goal *
- 5 representative caps for Dunbartonshire
- 4 representative caps for Scotch Counties
- 8 international trial matches for Scotland between 1881 and 1887.

* - McAulay played for Scotland as a goalkeeper in most of his international appearances, but also played as a forward.

== See also ==
- List of Scotland national football team captains
