= Eadie Fraser =

Canadian-born Scottish footballer

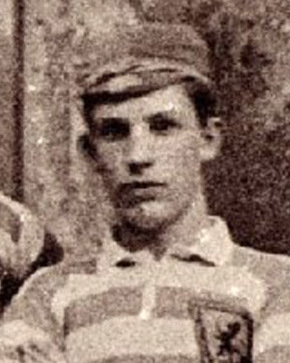
- Fraser in Scotland kit, 1882

Personal information
- Full name: Malcolm John Eadie Fraser
- Date of birth: 4 March 1860
- Place of birth: Goderich, Ontario, Canada
- Date of death: 8 January 1886 (aged 25)
- Place of death: Sydney, Australia
- Position: Right wing forward

Senior career*
Years	Team	Apps	(Gls)
1878–1884	Queen's Park		

International career
1880–1883	Scotland	5	(4)
- * Club domestic league appearances and goals

Malcolm John Eadie Fraser (4 March 1860 – 8 January 1886) was a Scottish international footballer who played for Queen's Park and Scotland in the 1870s and 1880s.

Fraser was born in Goderich, Canada West, the son of a Scottish Presbyterian minister. Returning to Scotland as a boy, he was brought up in Glasgow. A talented footballer, he won five caps for Scotland between 1880 and 1883, scoring four goals in the process. At Queen's Park he won two Scottish Cup medals in 1881 and 1882 plus three Glasgow Merchants Charity Cups, and was club secretary in 1882–83.

He died in Sydney, Australia of tuberculosis shortly after arriving on a sea journey from Scotland, having been sent there in an effort to cure the effects of the illness, which he contracted while working in Nigeria.

== See also ==
- List of Scotland international footballers born outside Scotland
