= John Smith (sportsman, born 1855) =

Scottish footballer and British Lions & Scotland international rugby union player

Personal information
- Date of birth: 12 August 1855
- Place of birth: Mauchline, Ayrshire, Scotland
- Date of death: 16 November 1934 (aged 79)
- Place of death: Kirkcaldy, Scotland
- Position: Inside forward

Senior career*
| Years | Team | Apps | (Gls) |
| 1877–1879 | Mauchline | | |
| 1880–1881 | Edinburgh University | | |
| 1881–1885 | Queen's Park | | |
| 1884–1888 | Corinthian FC | | |

International career^{‡}
| 1877–1884 | Scotland | 10 | (10) |
- * Club domestic league appearances and goals ‡ National team caps and goals as of

Rugby union career
- Position: Full Back
Amateur team(s)
| Years | Team | Apps | (Points) |
- Edinburgh University
| – | Edinburgh Wanderers | | |
Provincial / State sides
| Years | Team | Apps | (Points) |
| 1876 | Edinburgh District | | |
| 1876 | East of Scotland District | | |
International career
| Years | Team | Apps | (Points) |
| 1888 | British and Irish Lions | 9 | (0) |

John Smith (12 August 1855 – 16 November 1934) was a Scottish footballer of the 1870s and 1880s. He is also notable for playing rugby union and was a member of the first British Lions team that toured Australia and New Zealand in 1888.

== Football career ==
=== Club career ===
Smith began playing football at Mauchline F.C. before transferring to Edinburgh University while he studied. After completing his studies in the early 1880s he joined Queen's Park, where he won the Scottish Cup in 1881, 1882 and 1884. He became the first player to score a hat-trick in a Scottish Cup final when he scored all three of Queen's Park's goals in the 1881 final replay against Dumbarton. He was not selected to play in the 1882 final and no match took place in 1884 – Queen's Park were awarded the trophy after Vale of Leven failed to appear. In 1884 Smith was part of the Queen's Park team that reached the FA Cup Final, losing 2–1 to Blackburn Rovers. Whilst at Queen's Park, he also finished second in the 100 yards at the inaugural Scottish Athletics Championships of 1883.

Smith often played under the pseudonyms J.C. Miller and J.S. Miller. He also played occasionally as a guest for the Corinthians, Swifts and Liverpool Ramblers. He was banned from playing for or against any Scottish club or for the Scottish national team in 1885 after he played for Corinthians against a professional English club, thus breaching the Scottish Football Association's amateur regulations.

=== International career ===
Smith earned ten caps in total for the Scotland national football team, scoring 10 goals. His first four appearances were as a Mauchline player – he was the sole club representative to have been selected for international duty. In what proved to be his final appearance before being banished by the governing body, he scored the only goal of the match as Scotland defeated England to secure the 1883–84 British Home Championship (the first edition of the competition).

==== International goals ====
Scores and results list Scotland's goal tally first.

| # | Date | Venue | Opponent | Score | Result | Competition |
|---|---|---|---|---|---|---|
| 1 | 5 April 1879 | Kennington Oval, London | England | 3–1 | 4–5 | Friendly |
| 2 | 7 April 1879 | Acton Park, Wrexham | Wales | 2–0 | 3–0 | Friendly |
| 3 | 7 April 1879 | Acton Park, Wrexham | Wales | 3–0 | 3–0 | Friendly |
| 4 | 12 March 1881 | Kennington Oval, London | England | 1–0 | 6–1 | Friendly |
| 5 | 12 March 1881 | Kennington Oval, London | England | 1–0 | 3–1 | Friendly |
| 6 | 12 March 1881 | Kennington Oval, London | England | 1–0 | 5–1 | Friendly |
| 7 | 10 March 1883 | Bramall Lane, Sheffield | England | 1–0 | 3–2 | Friendly |
| 8 | 10 March 1883 | Bramall Lane, Sheffield | England | 2–1 | 3–2 | Friendly |
| 9 | 12 March 1883 | Acton Park, Wrexham | Wales | 1–0 | 3–0 | Friendly |
| 10 | 15 March 1884 | Cathkin Park [I], Glasgow | England | 1–0 | 1–0 | British Home Championship |

=== Referee ===
Smith sometimes officiated as a football referee.

== Rugby Union career ==
As well as football, Smith also played rugby union. He played as a forward for Edinburgh University and Edinburgh Wanderers, and was capped by Edinburgh District in 1876 and by East of Scotland District the following year.

In 1876 Smith was a reserve for the Scottish national rugby team. In 1888 he was selected as a member of the British and Irish Lions team to tour New Zealand and Australia (this squad contained few full internationals as the national bodies perceived it as akin to a professional enterprise and refused to sanction it). His skills as a player were called upon on nine occasions, though he failed to score in any of the matches. His primary role on the 1888 tour was to act as the team's referee.

== Medical career ==
As a physician, he practised in Brycehall, Kirkcaldy.

== See also ==
- List of Scotland national football team hat-tricks
