= John Kay (Scottish footballer) =

Scottish footballer

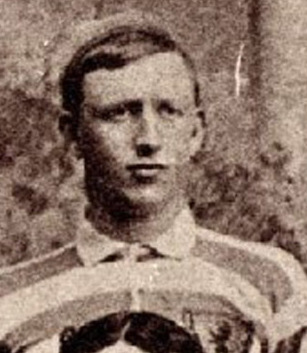
- Kay in Scotland kit, 1882

Personal information
- Full name: John Leck Kay
- Date of birth: 6 September 1857
- Place of birth: Crossmyloof, Scotland
- Date of death: 1 March 1933 (aged 75)
- Place of death: Glasgow, Scotland
- Position: Outside forward

Senior career*
Years	Team	Apps	(Gls)
18??–1879	Third Lanark		
1879–1883	Queen's Park		
1883–18??	Third Lanark		
- Pollokshields Athletic

International career
1880–1884	Scotland	6	(5)
- * Club domestic league appearances and goals

John Leck Kay (6 September 1857 – 1 March 1933) was a Scottish footballer of the 1870s and 1880s who played mainly as a left winger.

Kay's first senior club was Third Lanark where he won a Scottish Cup runners-up medal in 1878. He moved to Queen's Park in 1879 where he won three successive Scottish Cup winners' medals in 1880, 1881 and 1882, plus two Glasgow Merchants Charity Cups. He returned to Third Lanark in 1883 and later had a short spell at Pollokshields Athletic before emigrating to the United States in 1887.

He was capped 6 times by the Scotland national team between 1880 and 1884, scoring 5 goals.
