= Crosshill, Glasgow =

Area of Glasgow, Scotland

Coordinates: 55.83°N 4.25°W

Crosshill: Scots: Croashull
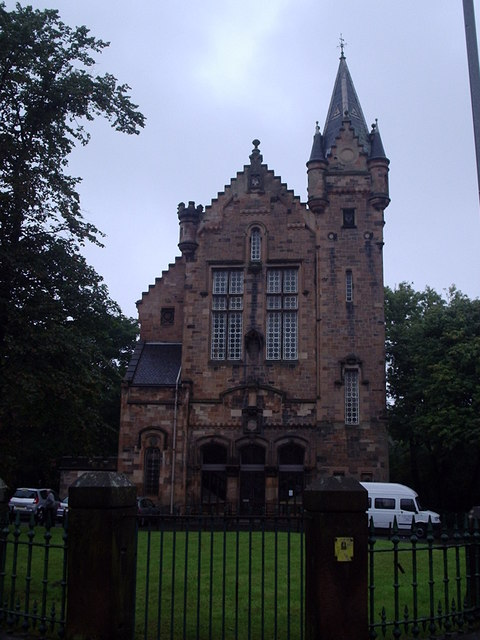
- Dixon Halls, formerly Crosshill and Govanhill Burgh Hall

- Location within Glasgow
- OS grid reference: NS590619
- Council area: Glasgow
- Lieutenancy area: Glasgow
- Country: Scotland
- Sovereign state: United Kingdom
- Post town: GLASGOW
- Postcode district: G42 8
- Dialling code: 0141
- Police: Scotland
- Fire: Scottish
- Ambulance: Scottish
- UK Parliament: Glasgow South
- Scottish Parliament: Glasgow Southside

Crosshill is an area of Glasgow, Scotland. It is situated south of the River Clyde. It was an independent police burgh from 1871 to 1891 before being annexed by the City of Glasgow.

== History ==
Formerly part of the County of Renfrew, Crosshill had a brief existence as an independent police burgh from 1871 until it was absorbed by Glasgow in 1891. Crosshill and Govanhill to its north form a continuous built-up area and due to sharing a postcode and amenities, as well as a similar design style in some buildings, they are often considered to be the same district (however historically this was not the case – Govanhill was in the County of Lanark). Crosshill also borders Queen's Park and Mount Florida to the south, Strathbungo to the west and Polmadie to the east. The area contains Holyrood Secondary School and former football stadium Cathkin Park.

== Etymology ==
The name Crosshill was formerly written as Corsehill or Corshill. In earlier maps the area is called Corsehill, which means Gorse hill, so the name is probably a corruption of this earlier name, and does not refer to a cross.

According to Hugh Macintosh's The Origin and History of Glasgow Streets (1902), "Crosshill derives its name from an ancient cross which stood on a height still named the Cross Hill. This monument was about ten feet high and three-and-a-half wide, and bore a sculptured representation of Christ entering Jerusalem riding on an ass. It was removed by some vandals about the end of the eighteenth century." This would suggest that if a corruption of the name "Corse Hill" to "Cross Hill" occurred, it may indeed have resulted from the presence of a cross on the hill.

== Architecture and art ==
=== Victorian architecture ===
==== Balmoral Crescent ====
Balmoral Crescent (Queen's Drive) with a view to Queen's Park, is one of the city's most distinctive examples of Victorian architecture. Designed by Scots architect William McNicol Whyte, around 1886, the curved terrace incorporates a figure at the eastern corner, holding a shield and brandishing a now broken sword. As guardian of Crosshill, she is reminiscent of the Statue of Liberty. There is also a carved portrait of the architect on a west-facing oriel window.

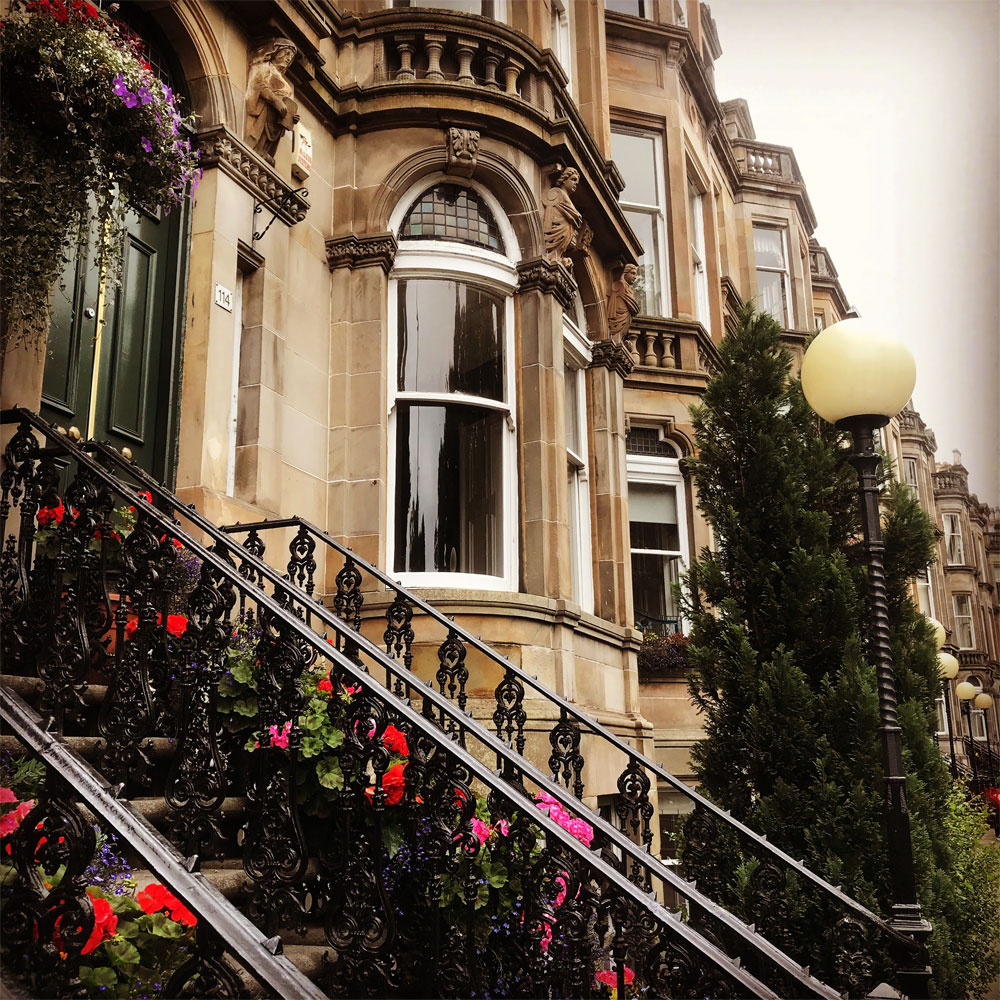
Balmoral Crescent in Crosshill, by William McNicol Whyte

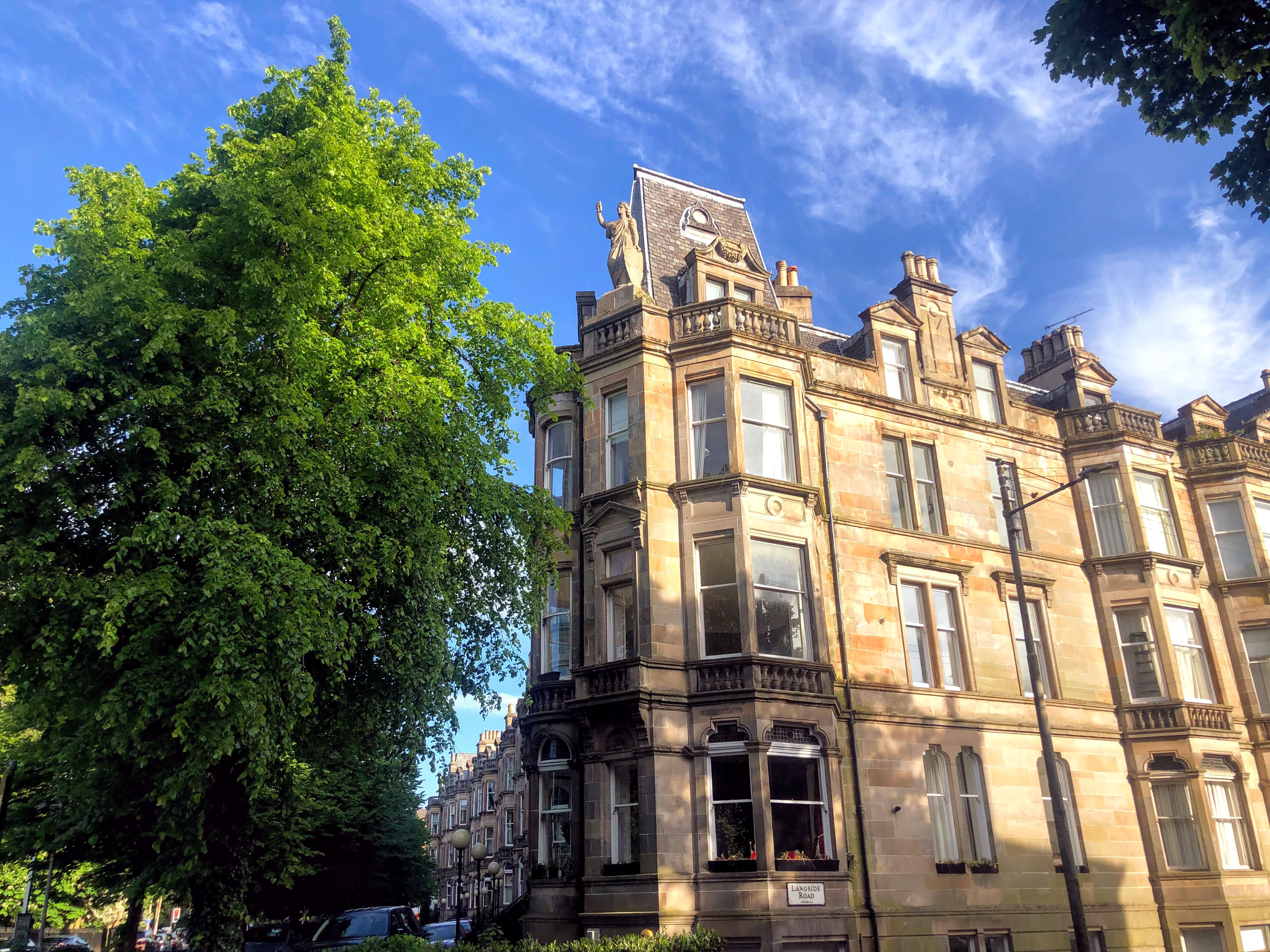
The female statue on tenements overlooking Queen’s Park

==== Dixon Halls ====
Dixon Halls was gifted to the burghs by William Smith Dixon of Govan Iron Works. Situated at an angle of 45 degrees to Dixon Avenue and Cathcart Road, the Scottish Baronial building was completed in 1879. The architect was Frank Stirrat, the winner of a competition for its commission. The boundary between the burghs of Crosshill and Govanhill bisected the building allowing courtrooms and offices for each burgh to have separate access. The building was renamed Dixon Halls shortly after it opened.

==== Queen's Park United Presbyterian Church ====
Designed by the eminent Scottish architect Alexander "Greek" Thomson in 1869-9, this church at 368 Langside Road was one of only three built by Thomson. The church was damaged beyond repair by German incendiary bombs on 24 March 1943 and subsequently demolished.

=== Crosshill Avenue sheltered housing ===
The red brick and red tiled cottages in Crosshill Avenue contrast with the sandstone villas surrounding them. They were designed by the architect Ronald Bradbury and built after 1948. The development was awarded a Festival of Britain Medal in 1951.

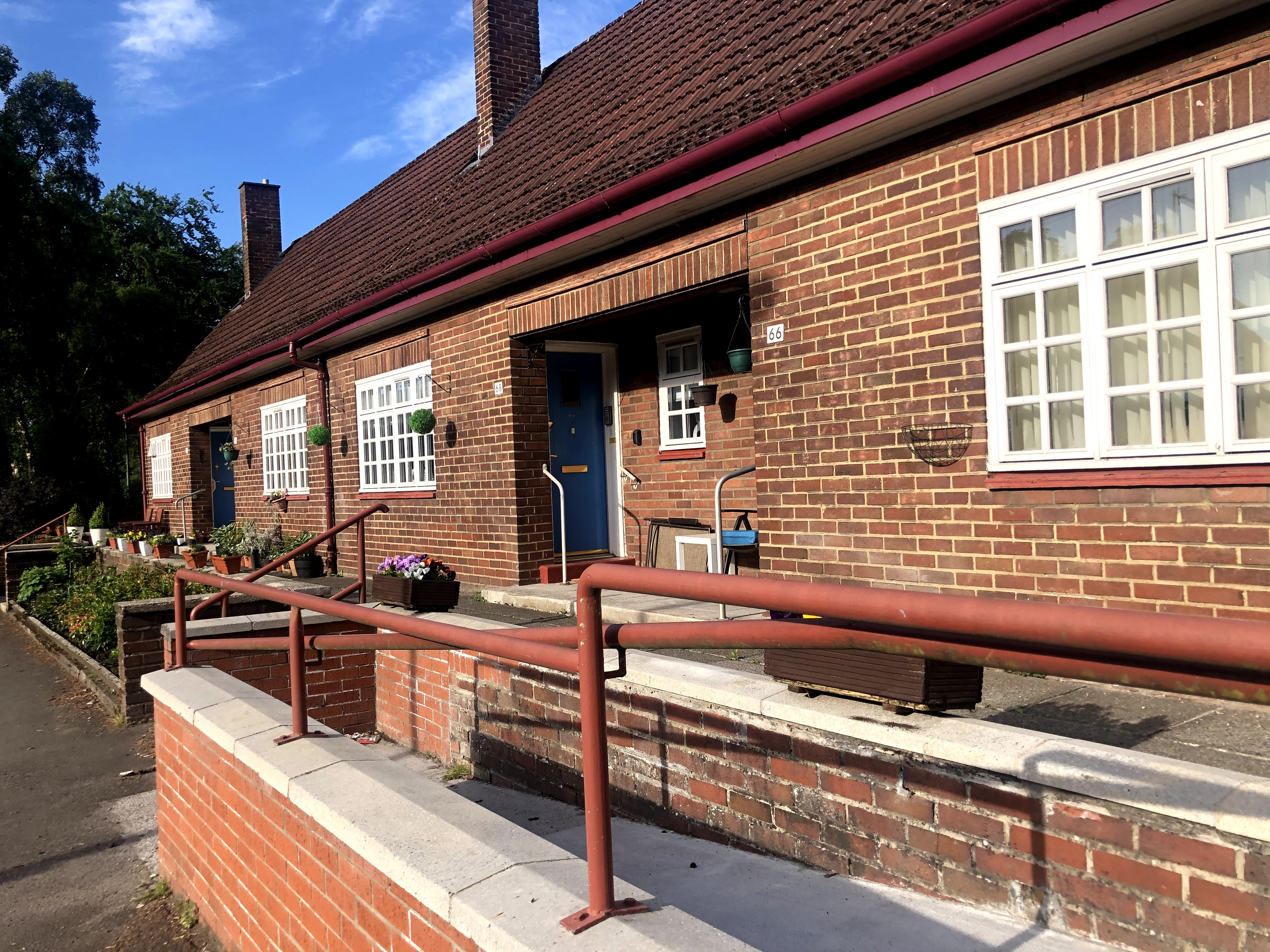
Crosshill Avenue sheltered housing

== Government ==
Crosshill is in the Southside Central ward for Glasgow City Council. It lies within the Glasgow Southside (Scottish Parliament constituency); the sitting MSP is Nicola Sturgeon. Crosshill is in the Glasgow South (UK Parliament constituency); the sitting MP is Stewart McDonald. The area is covered by Crosshill and Govanhill Community Council.

== Archaeological interest ==
The public gardens named Kingsley Gardens, and the adjacent grounds of the Hampden Bowling Club, are thought to be the site of the original Hampden Park Stadium. Archaeology Scotland and local residents from the Bowling Club and Community Gardens plan to excavate parts of the Crosshill site where it is believed the first stadium once stood. The dig is funded by Historic Environment Scotland and is planned to take place June 2021.

=== First Hampden Park mural ===
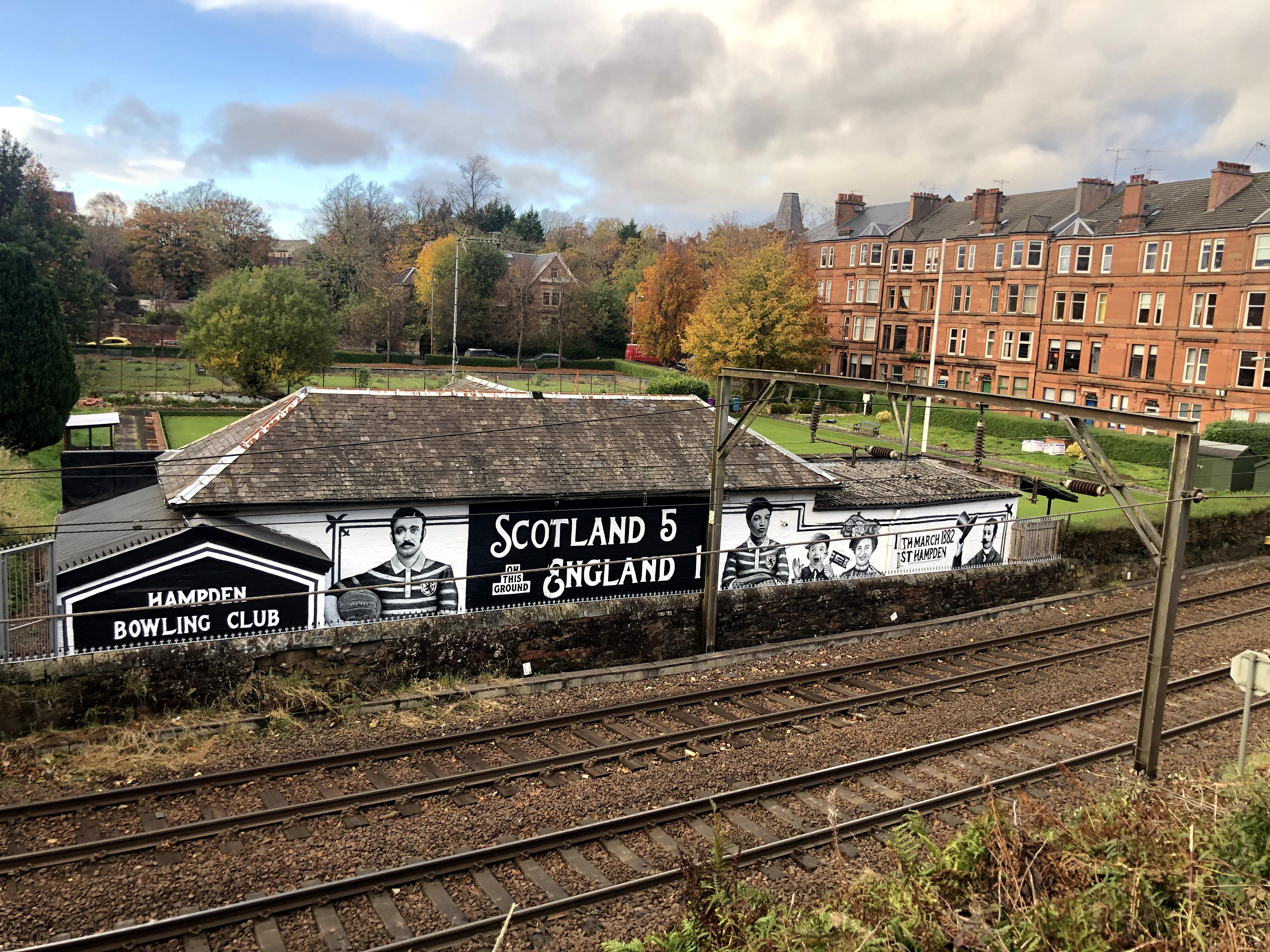
Kingsley Gardens and Hampden Bowling Club, site of the original Hampden Park

People travelling on the Cathcart Circle Line railway pass a commemorative mural on the wall of the Hampden Bowling Club, commemorating Scotland's 5-1 win over England at the site of Glasgow's first Hampden Park. The mural, by Glasgow-based artist Ashley Rawson, can also be viewed from the nearby Cathcart Road.

== Transport ==
The area is served by Crosshill railway station, on the Cathcart Circle Lines.

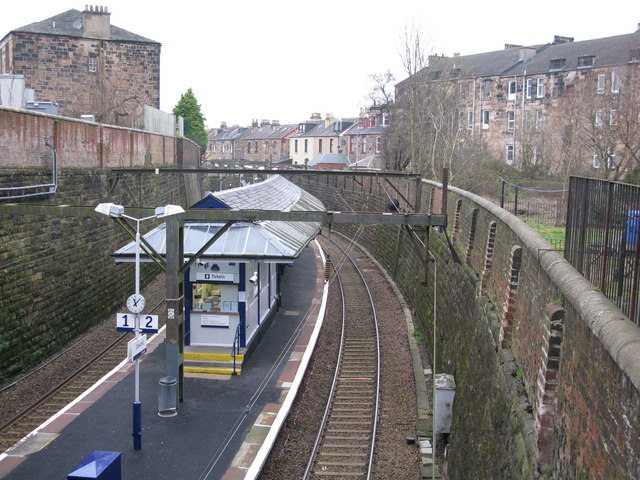
Crosshill station in 2008

== Notable natives and residents ==
- John Buchan (1875 – 1940), most famous as the author of the novel The Thirty-Nine Steps and adapted for the screen on multiple occasions, lived at 34 Queen Mary Avenue the manse for the John Knox Free Church, Gorbals where his father the Rev John Buchan was Minister. The house is Grade B Listed and bears a plaque recognising the link to Buchan.
- Hannah Frank (1908 – 2008), artist and sculptor
- Ashley Rawson, artist and illustrator
