= William Harrower =

Scottish footballer

Personal information
- Date of birth: 9 October 1861
- Place of birth: Glasgow, Scotland
- Date of death: 27 October 1910 (aged 49)
- Place of death: Paisley, Scotland
- Position: Inside forward

Senior career*
Years	Team	Apps	(Gls)
1881–1886	Queen's Park		

International career
1882–1886	Scotland	3	(4)
- * Club domestic league appearances and goals

William Harrower (9 October 1861 – 27 October 1910) was a Scottish footballer who played for Queen's Park and Scotland as an inside forward.

In three matches for the national team he scored four goals. He scored in each of his international participations, helping Scotland to win by a margin (3 goals or more) every time.

Harrower died early, at the age of 49.

== Honours ==
=== Club ===
Queen's Park

- Scottish Cup: 1882, 1884, 1886
- Glasgow Merchants Charity Cup: 1883, 1884, 1885

=== International ===
Scotland

- British Home Championship: 1883–84, 1885–86 (shared)
