= James Richmond (footballer, born 1858) =

Scottish footballer

Personal information
- Date of birth: 22 March 1858
- Place of birth: Glasgow, Scotland
- Date of death: 13 January 1898 (aged 39)
- Position: Forward

Senior career*
Years	Team	Apps	(Gls)
- Clydesdale
- Queen's Park

International career
1877–1882	Scotland	3	(1)
- * Club domestic league appearances and goals

James Richmond (22 March 1858 – 13 January 1898) was a Scottish footballer who played as a forward.

== Career ==
Born in Glasgow, Richmond played club football for Clydesdale and Queen's Park, and he made three appearances for Scotland, including scoring on his debut in 1877.
