= Henry McNeil (footballer) =

Scottish footballer

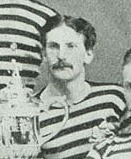

Personal information
- Full name: Henry McNeil
- Date of birth: 1849
- Place of birth: Shandon, Scotland
- Date of death: 2 June 1924 (aged 74–75)
- Place of death: Rutherglen, Scotland
- Position: Forward

Senior career*
Years	Team	Apps	(Gls)
1872–1873	Third Lanark		
1873–1883	Queen's Park		

International career
1874–1881	Scotland	10	(6)
- * Club domestic league appearances and goals

Henry McNeil (1849 – 2 June 1924) was a Scottish footballer.

During his career, McNeil played in several positions for Queen's Park (where he won five Scottish Cups) (Note: Including the 1881 Scottish Cup Final where McNeil was captain in the original match but missed the replay due to injury.) and Third Lanark, as well as the Scotland national team.

McNeil was football's caps world record holder from March 1881 (taking the title from clubmate Billy MacKinnon) until March 1882 when John Price of Wales earned his 11th cap.

He later managed a sports shop in central Glasgow with his brother Peter, ran a hotel in Bangor, County Down with his brother Moses, operated a public house in Rutherglen and worked as a travelling salesman.

His brothers Moses and Peter McNeil were also footballers, who were among the founders of Rangers F.C.; Henry contributed to some of Rangers' first matches in 1872 as a guest player and Moses and Henry McNeil played together for Scotland. Another sibling, William, also played for Rangers.

== International goals ==
Scores and results list Scotland's goal tally first.

#	Date	Venue	Opponent	Score	Result	Competition
1	6 March 1875	Kennington Oval, London	England	1–1	2–2	Friendly
2	4 March 1876	Hamilton Crescent, Glasgow	England	2–0	3–0	Friendly
3	25 March 1876	Hamilton Crescent, Glasgow	England	4–0	4–0	Friendly
4	2 March 1878	Hampden Park, Glasgow	England	3–0	7–2	Friendly
5	2 March 1878	Hampden Park, Glasgow	England	6–0	7–2	Friendly
6	14 March 1881	Acton Park, Wrexham	Wales	0–2	1–5	Friendly
