= Charles Campbell (footballer) =

Scottish footballer

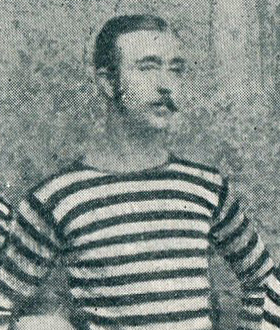

Personal information
- Date of birth: 20 January 1854
- Place of birth: Coupar Angus, Scotland
- Date of death: April 1927 (aged 73)
- Place of death: Ireland
- Position: Half back

Senior career*
Years	Team	Apps	(Gls)
1870–1886	Queen's Park	2	(0)

International career
1874–1886	Scotland	13	(1)
- * Club domestic league appearances and goals

Charles Campbell (20 January 1854 – April 1927) was a Scottish footballer of the 1870s and 1880s who played for, and captained, Queen's Park and the Scotland national team.

A former pupil of the Edinburgh Academy, Campbell joined Queen's Park, Scotland's oldest football club, in 1870. He won eight Scottish Cup winner's medals with the club and was runner-up in the 1884 and 1885 FA Cup finals. He sometimes played under the pseudonym "C. Elliott", including in major finals. He was also a member of the famous English amateur side Corinthians.

Campbell earned 13 caps for Scotland between 1874 and 1886, captaining them on nine occasions. He scored his only Scotland goal in a 2–0 win over Wales in March 1877 and lost only one match while playing for his country.

A keen orator, Campbell was also an important football bureaucrat, serving on the Queen's Park committee between 1874 and 1890 and holding the position of club president in 1879–80. He was elected president of the Scottish Football Association for the 1889–90 season. Campbell also served as match official for the 1889 Scottish Cup Final.

Campbell later moved to Ireland, where he had strong family connections and had spent much of his childhood, and died there in 1927. He was posthumously inducted into the Scottish Football Hall of Fame in 2005.

== Career statistics ==
=== International ===
Scotland
Year	Apps	Goals
1874	1	0
1875	—	
1876	1	0
1877	2	1
1878	1	0
1879	1	0
1880	1	0
1881	1	0
1882	2	0
1883	—	
1884	1	0
1885	1	0
1886	1	0
Total	13	1

==== International goals ====
Scores and results list Scotland's goal tally first.

#	Date	Venue	Opponent	Score	Result	Competition
1	5 March 1877	Acton Park, Wrexham	Wales	1–0	2–0	Friendly

== See also ==
- List of Scotland national football team captains
