= David Davidson (Queen's Park footballer) =

Scottish footballer

David Davidson (31 August 1850 – 7 March 1919) was a Scottish footballer, who played for Queen's Park and the Scotland national squad in the 1870s and 1880s.

== See also ==
- List of Scotland national football team captains
