= George Ker =

Scottish footballer

Personal information
- Date of birth: 26 February 1860
- Place of birth: Glasgow, Scotland
- Date of death: 26 February 1922 (aged 62)
- Place of death: Yakima, Washington, U.S.
- Positions: Defender; striker

Senior career*
Years	Team	Apps	(Gls)
- Queen's Park Juniors
- Kerland
- Alexandra Athletic
1877–1884	Queen's Park		

International career
1880–1882	Scotland	5	(10)
- * Club domestic league appearances and goals

George Ker (26 February 1860 – 26 February 1922) was a Scottish footballer who played for Queen's Park and the Scotland national team.

== Football career ==
Ker played for Queen's Park Juniors, Kerland FC, and Alexandra Athletic before joining Queen's Park in 1877. Until 1878, Ker had played as a defender but converted to a striker in 1878. He won the Scottish Cup in 1880, 1881 and 1882, scoring in the 1882 replay win over Dumbarton.

After the 1881–82 season he began struggling with injuries and retired early in summer of 1884.

He was capped five times by the Scotland national team, scoring ten goals including a hat-trick against England in March 1880.

His older brother William was also a Scotland international, winning two caps, including the first international against England on 30 November 1872.

=== International goals ===
Scores and results list Scotland's goal tally first.

#	Date	Venue	Opponent	Score	Result	Competition
1	13 March 1880	Hampden Park [I], Glasgow	England	1–0	5–4	Friendly
2	13 March 1880	Hampden Park [I], Glasgow	England	3–2	5–4	Friendly
3	13 March 1880	Hampden Park [I], Glasgow	England	4–2	5–4	Friendly
4	12 March 1881	Kennington Oval, London	England	4–1	6–1	Friendly
5	12 March 1881	Kennington Oval, London	England	6–1	6–1	Friendly
6	14 March 1881	Acton Park, Wrexham	Wales	1–1	5–1	Friendly
7	14 March 1881	Acton Park, Wrexham	Wales	4–1	5–1	Friendly
8	11 March 1882	Hampden Park [I], Glasgow	England	2–1	5–1	Friendly
9	11 March 1882	Hampden Park [I], Glasgow	England	5–1	5–1	Friendly
10	25 March 1882	Hampden Park [I], Glasgow	Wales	2–0	5–0	Friendly

== Emigration and death ==
After emigrating to the United States in July 1884, Ker died in Yakima, Washington on his 62nd birthday on February 26, 1922.

== See also ==
- List of Scotland national football team hat-tricks
