= List of Everton F.C. players =

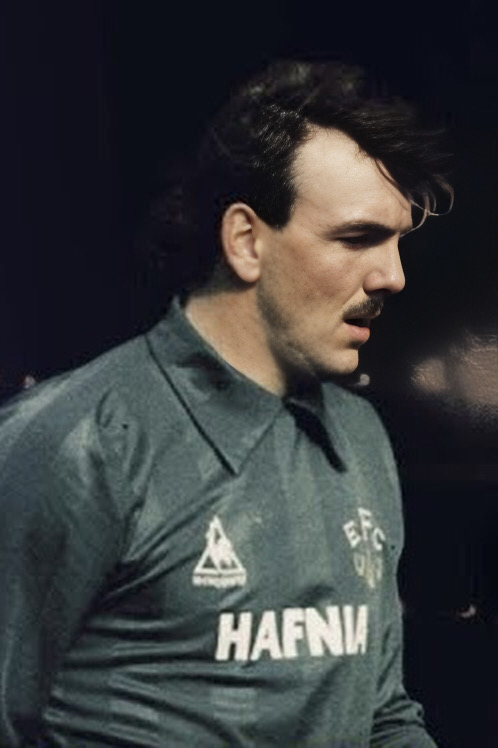
Neville Southall is Everton's most-capped player of all time, making 751 appearances in 17 years for the club

This is a list of notable footballers who have played for Everton. Generally, this means players that have played 100 or more first-team matches for the club. A number of other players who have played an important role in a league title win have also been included for their impact – for example Andy Gray. Players in Everton's early history are also included despite not necessarily playing 100 matches.

For a list of all Everton players, major or minor, with a Wikipedia article, see Category:Everton F.C. players, and for the current squad see the main Everton F.C. article.

Players are listed according to the date of their first team debut. Appearances and goals are for first-team competitive matches only; wartime matches are excluded. Substitute appearances included.

== Notable players ==
Appearance figures as of 25 October 2026

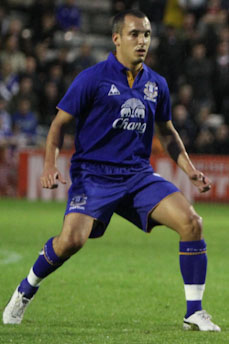
Leon Osman made 433 appearances for Everton, the tenth-most of all time

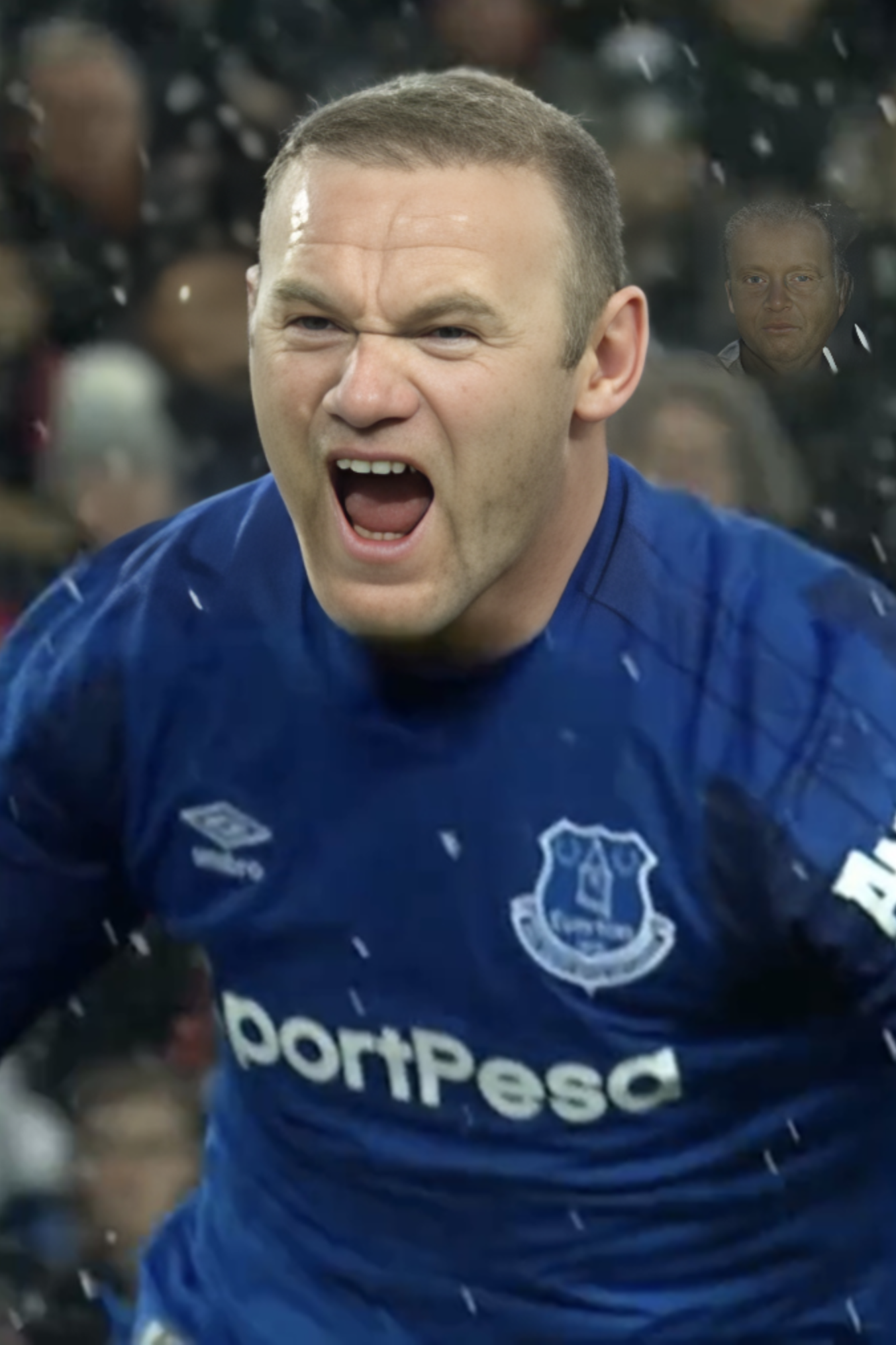
Wayne Rooney made 117 appearances in two spells at Everton, winning 2002 UEFA European Under-17 Football Championship Golden Player

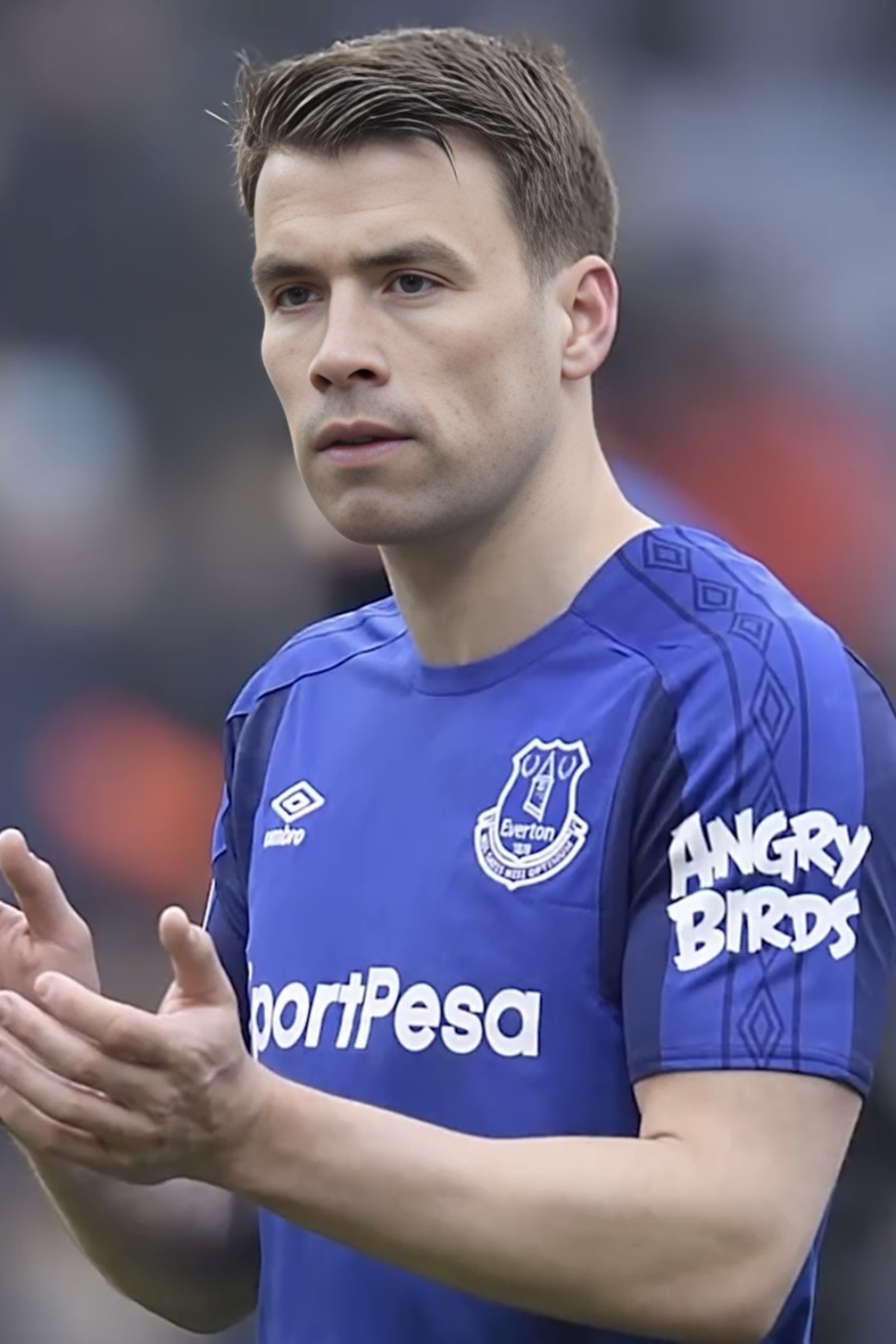
Séamus Coleman made 435 appearances for Everton and served as captain from 2019 to 2026

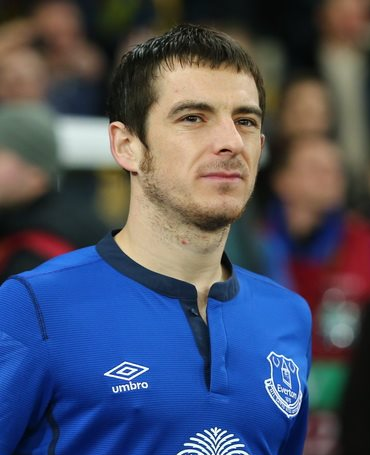
Leighton Baines made 420 appearances for Everton, winning 2010–11 & 2012–13 Everton Player of the Season

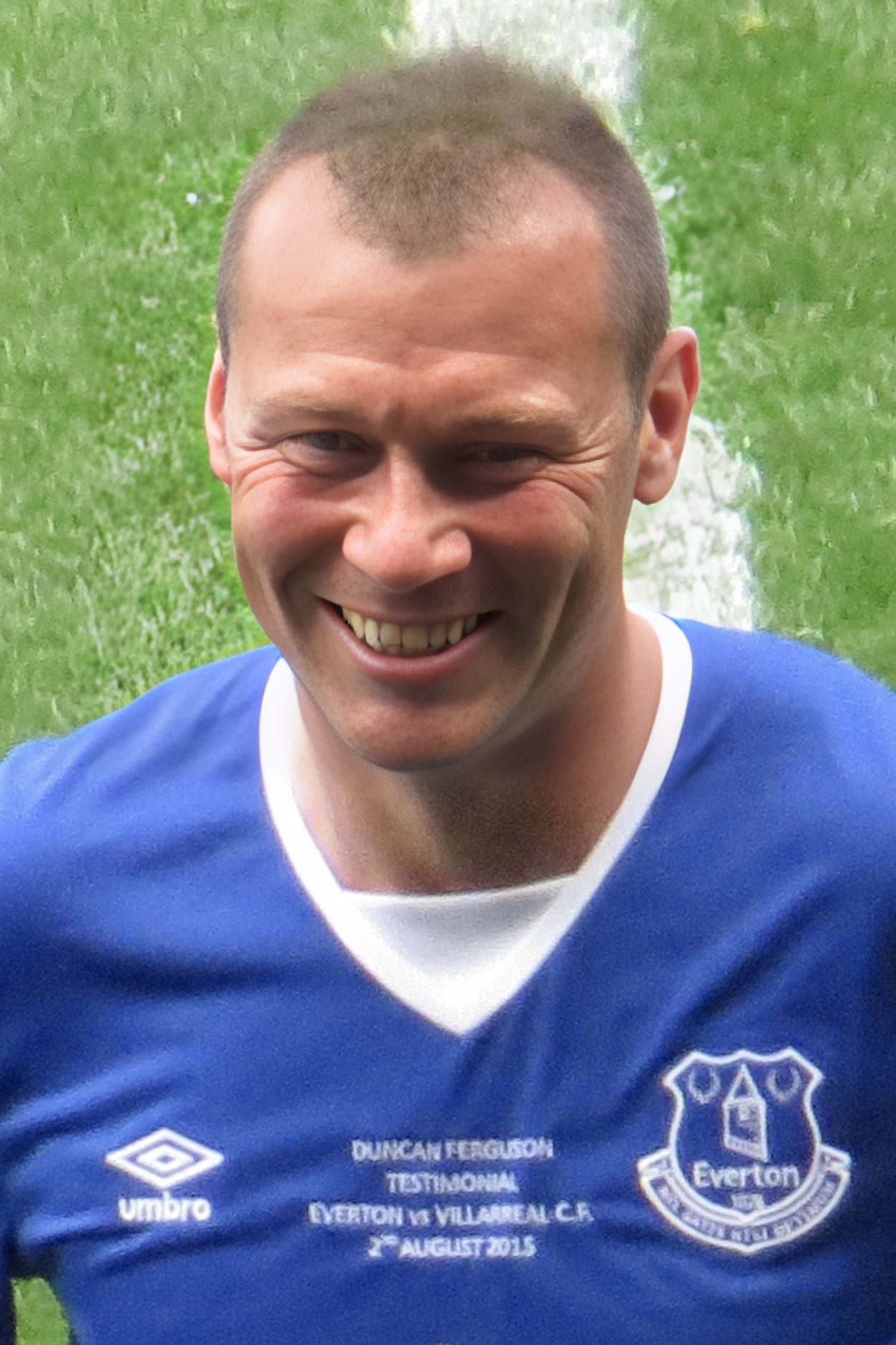
Duncan Ferguson made 272 appearances and scored 72 goals for Everton. He later served as caretaker manager for the club at two separates spells in 2019 and 2022

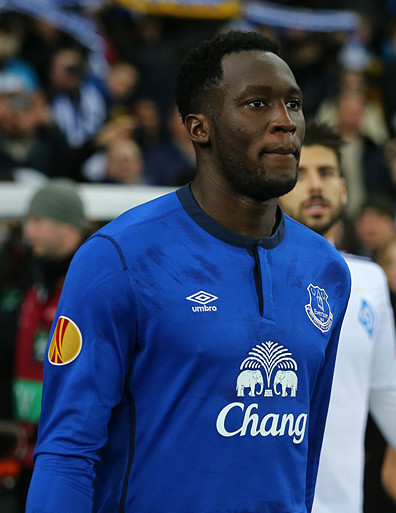
Romelu Lukaku made 166 appearances and scored 87 goals with Everton

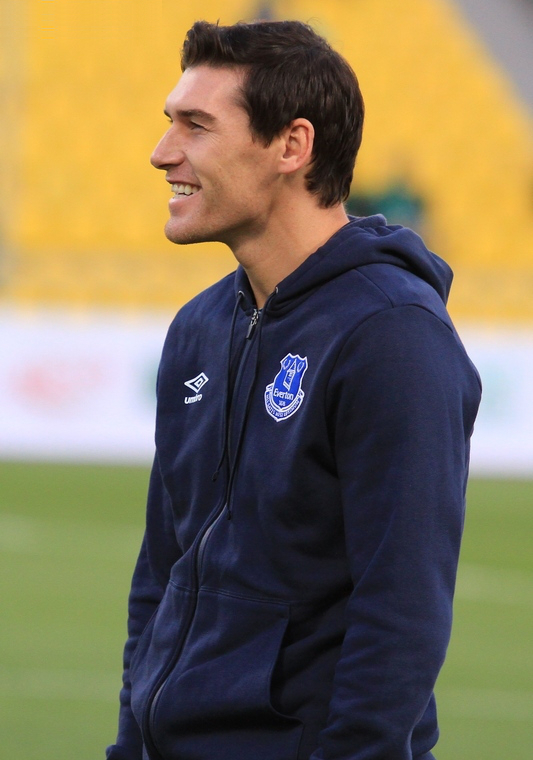
Gareth Barry made 155 appearances for Everton

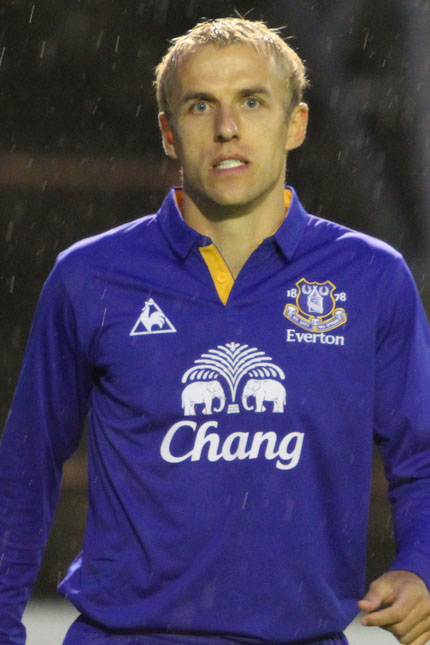
Phil Neville made 303 appearances for Everton and served as captain from 2007 to 2013

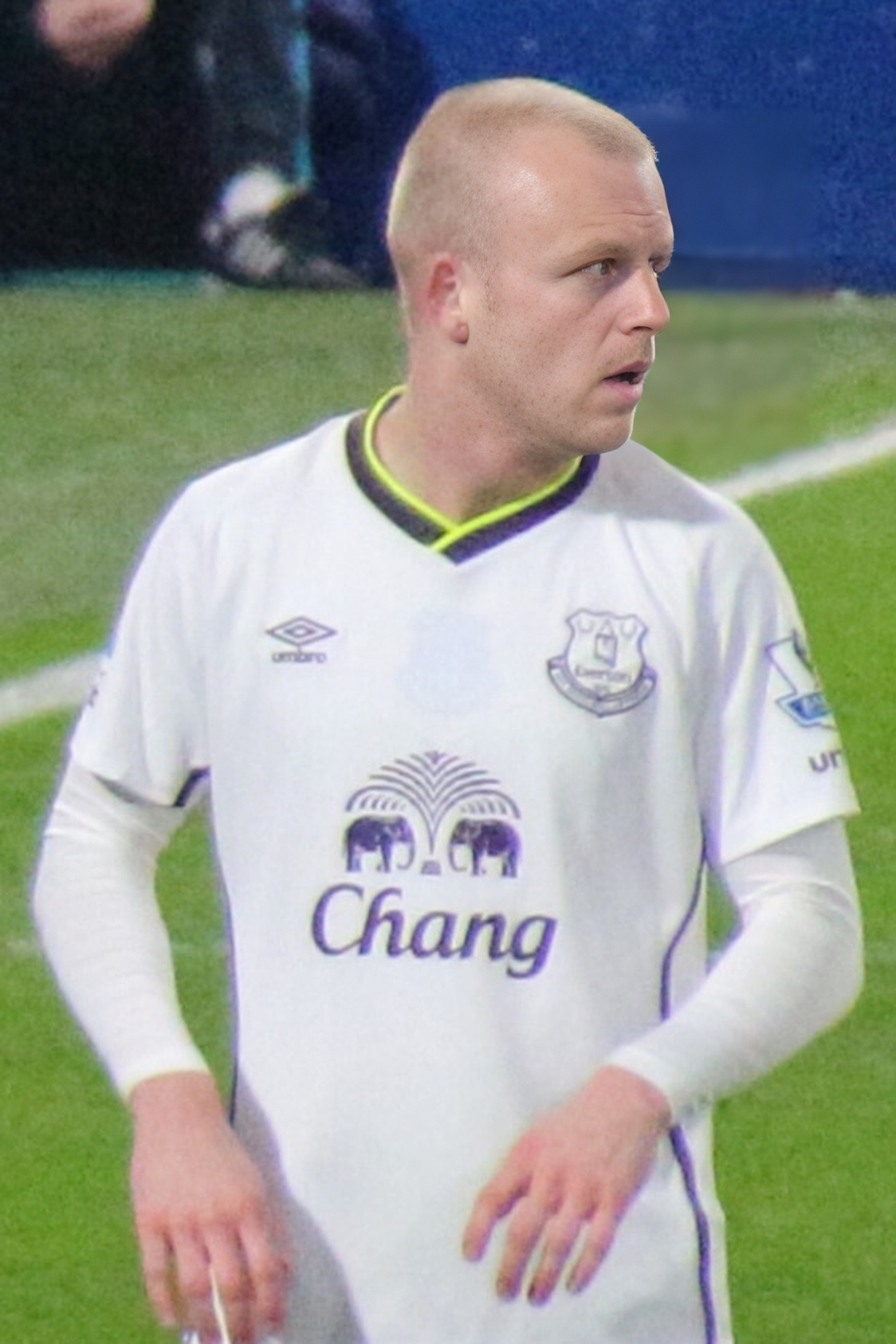
Steven Naismith made 123 appearances and scored 25 goals with Everton

Name	Nationality	Position	Everton career	Appearances	Goals	Notes
George Fleming	England	MF	1887–1888	5	2	First League goalscorer for Everton
George Farmer	Wales	FW	1887–1889	35	3	First competitive goalscorer for Everton
Alex McKinnon	Scotland	FW	1888	6	4	First hat-trick goalscorer
Nick Ross	Scotland	FB/FW	1888–1889	19	5	Club captain 1888–1889
Bob Kelso	Scotland	FB	1888–1889, 1891–1895	103	5	
Alf Milward	England	FW	1888–1896	224	96	
Edgar Chadwick	England	FW	1888–1898	300	110	Club captain 1897
Johnny Holt	England	FB	1888–1898	252	4	First England international
Andrew Hannah	Scotland	FB	1889–1891	44	0	Club captain 1889–1891
Alexander Brady	Scotland	FW	1889–1891	36	20	Member of 1890-91 title winning side
Dan Doyle	Scotland	CB	1889–1891	41	1	Captained Everton's first title-winning side
David Jardine	Scotland	GK	1889–1894	137	0	
Alex Latta	Scotland	FW	1889–1895	148	70	
Charlie Parry	Wales	FB	1889–1895	94	5	First Everton player to win an international cap for Wales
Fred Geary	England	FW	1889–1895	99	86	First goalscorer at Goodison Park
William Mamooth	Scotland	FB	1890–1891	26	0	Joined Liverpool FC after the 1892 split
Bob Howarth	England	FB	1891–1893	68	0	Club captain 1892–1893
Richard Williams	England	GK	1891–1894	70	0	Member of Everton's first FA Cup final team
Jack Bell	Scotland	FW	1892–1898, 1901–1903	199	70	First Everton goalscorer in a FA Cup Final
Dickie Boyle	Scotland	HB	1892–1900	243	8	
William Stewart	Scotland	HB	1892–1900	137	6	
Jack Southworth	England	FW	1893–1894	32	36	First ever double hat-trick scorer
Tom McInnes	Scotland	FW	1894–1895	47	18	Scorer of the first goal in a Merseyside derby
Jack Taylor	Scotland	HB	1896–1910	456	80	Club captain 1898–1910
Willie Muir	Scotland	GK	1897–1901	137	0	
Sam Wolstenholme	England	FB	1897–1903	170	8	
Walter Balmer	England	FB	1897–1908	331	1	
John Proudfoot	Scotland	FW	1898–1901	89	31	*Inclusion reason required*
Jack Crelley	England	FB	1898–1907	127	0	
Jimmy Settle	England	FB	1899–1908	269	97	Top Football League goalscorer in 1901–02
Walter Abbott	England	FW	1899–1908	292	37	
Jack Sharp	England	FW	1899–1909	342	80	
Tom Booth	England	HB	1900–1907	185	11	
Alex "Sandy" Young	Scotland	FW	1901–1910	314	125	Top Football League goalscorer in 1906–07
Bob Balmer	England	FB	1902–1911	188	0	
Harry Makepeace	England	HB	1902–1914	336	23	
Thomas McDermott	Scotland	HB	1903–1905	73	19	*Inclusion reason required*
Harold Hardman	England	FW	1903–1908	156	29	
Billy Scott	Ireland	GK	1904–1912	289		
Hugh Bolton	Scotland	FW	1906–1908	87	34	Member of the first Everton team to win the FA Cup.
Joe Donnachie	Scotland	CB	1906–1908, 1919–1920	58	0	*Inclusion reason required*
William Stevenson	England	DF	1907–1913	125	0	
Jock Maconnachie	Scotland	FB	1907–1919	270	7	
Tim Coleman	England	FW	1908–1910	71	30	Prominent member of the Players' Union.
Bert Freeman	England	CF	1908–1911	94	67	Top Football League goalscorer in 1908–09
Val Harris	Ireland	HB	1908–1914	214	2	
Bill Lacey	Ireland / Republic of Ireland	Va	1909–1912	40	11	First player to be capped at full international level while playing for both Everton and Liverpool
George Beare	England	FW	1909–1913	125	19	
Tom Fleetwood	England	HB	1910–1922	285	10	
Frank Jefferis	England	FW	1910–1919	137	22	
Sam Chedgzoy	England	FW	1910–1925	300	36	
Joe Smith	England	FW	1911–1912	10	0	*Inclusion reason required*
Alan Grenyer	England	CH	1911–1923	148	9	
Bobby Parker	Scotland	FW	1913–1922	92	71	Top Football League goalscorer in 1914–15
George Harrison	England	FW	1913–1923	190	17	
Tommy Fern	England	GK	1913–1924	231	0	
Joe Clennell	England	FW	1913–1921	74	33	Member of 1914-15 League Championship winning team
Jimmy Galt	Scotland	MF	1913–1915	36	4	Member of 1914-15 League Championship winning team
Bob Thompson	England	FB	1913–1921	89	0	Member of 1914-15 League Championship winning team
William Brown	Scotland	HB	1914–1927	179	0	
Billy Kirsopp	England	FW	1915–1921	63	29	Member of 1914-15 League Championship winning team
Joe Peacock	England	HB	1919–1926	161	12	
Jock McDonald	Scotland	FB	1920–1926	224	0	
David Reid	Ireland	FW	1920–1926	101	11	
Wilf Chadwick	England	FW	1921–1925	109	55	Top Football League goalscorer in 1923–24
Doug Livingstone	Scotland	FB	1921–1925	100	0	
Bobby Irvine	Ireland	FW	1921–1928	214	57	
Hunter Hart	Scotland	MF	1921–1929	300	5	
Neil McBain	Scotland	HB	1922–1925	103	1	
Alec Troup	Scotland	FW	1922–1929	259	35	
David Raitt	Scotland	FB	1922–1927	131	0	
Jack O'Donnell	England	FB	1924–1929	198	10	
Albert Virr	England	HB	1924–1929	127	3	
Dixie Dean	England	FW	1925–1937	431	377	All-time leading goalscorer for Everton
Arthur Davies	Wales	GK	1926–1929	94	0	*Inclusion reason required*
Edward Critchley	England	FW	1926–1934	229	42	
Warney Cresswell	England	FB	1926–1935	306	1	
Tony Weldon	Scotland	FW	1927–1929	74	13	Member of 1927–28 title-winning team
Jeremiah Kelly	Scotland	HB	1927–1929	83	1	Member of 1927–28 title-winning team
Tommy White	England	FW	1927–1937	201	66	
James Dunn	Scotland	FW	1928–1934	155	49	
Jimmy Stein	Scotland	FW	1928–1936	215	65	
Jock Thomson	Scotland	HB	1929–1938	296	5	
Ted Sagar	England	GK	1929–1952	495	0	
Tommy Johnson	England	FW	1929–1933	161	65	
Ben Williams	Wales	FB	1929–1935	139	0	
Cliff Britton	England	HB	1930–1938	240	3	
Charlie Gee	England	HB	1930–1938	212	2	
Albert Geldard	England	FW	1932–1937	179	37	
Joe Mercer	England	HB	1932–1946	184	2	
Jimmy Cunliffe	England	FW	1932–1938	187	76	
Billy Cook	Scotland	FB	1932–1938	250	6	
Stan Bentham	England	FW	1932–1948	125	7	
Jack Jones	England	DF	1933–1937	108	0	
Jackie Coulter	Ireland	MF	1934–1937	88	2	Gwladys Street's Hall of Fame member
Alex Stevenson	Ireland / Republic of Ireland	FW	1934–1949	271	90	
Torry Gillick	Scotland	FW	1935–1938	133	44	
T. G. Jones	Wales	FB	1936–1949	175	5	
Tommy Lawton	England	FW	1937–1945	95	70	Top Football League goalscorer in 1937–38, 1938–39
Norman Greenhalgh	England	FB	1937–1949	115	1	
Johnny Carey	Ireland / Republic of Ireland	Va	1942–1943	—	—	Manager 1958–1961
Wally Fielding	England	FW	1945–1959	410	54	
George Saunders	England	FB	1946–1951	140	0	
Jackie Grant	England	HB	1946–1954	133	11	
Eddie Wainwright	England	FW	1946–1955	228	76	
Tommy Eglington	Ireland / Republic of Ireland	FW	1946–1957	428	82	
Peter Farrell	Ireland / Republic of Ireland	HB	1946–1957	453	17	Club captain 1954–1957
Cyril Lello	England	HB	1947–1956	255	9	
Peter Corr	Republic of Ireland	MF	1948–1949	24	2	Member of the first non-UK side to beat England at home
Ted Buckle	England	FW	1949–1954	117	33	
Eric Moore	England	FB	1949–1956	184	0	
Jack Lindsay	Scotland	FB	1950–1953	115	2	
Jimmy O'Neill	Republic of Ireland	GK	1949–1960	213	0	
Tommy E. Jones	England	FB	1948–1961	411	14	Club captain 1957–1961
John Willie Parker	England	FW	1947–1956	176	89	
Tony McNamara	England	FW	1951–1957	113	22	
Don Donovan	Republic of Ireland	FB	1949–1958	187	2	
Dave Hickson	England	FW	1948–1955, 1957–1959	253	111	
Jimmy Tansey	England	FB	1952–1959	142	0	
Mick Meagan	Republic of Ireland	FB	1952–1964	175	1	
Jimmy Harris	England	FW	1955–1960	207	72	First League Cup goalscorer for Everton
Brian Harris	England	FW	1955–1966	360	29	
Albert Dunlop	England	GK	1956–1963	231	0	
Derek Temple	England	FW	1956–1967	277	84	
Bobby Collins	Scotland	MF	1958–1962	147	48	
Alex Parker	Scotland	FB	1958–1964	230	5	
Brian Labone	England	CB	1958–1971	533	2	Club captain 1965–1971
Billy Bingham	Northern Ireland	MF	1960–1962	98	26	Manager 1973–1977
Roy Vernon	Wales	FW	1960–1965	203	111	Club captain 1962–1965
Alex Young	Scotland	FW	1960–1968	275	109	
Jimmy Gabriel	Scotland	MF	1960–1967	304	37	Caretaker manager 1990, 1993–1994
Dennis Stevens	England	MF	1962–1965	145	32	First European goalscorer for Everton
Johnny Morrissey	England	FW	1962–1971	313	50	
Gordon West	England	GK	1962–1972	402	0	
Alex Scott	Scotland	FW	1962–1966	180	26	
Sandy Brown	Scotland	FB	1963–1970	253	11	
Andy Rankin	England	GK	1963–1970	106	0	
Colin Harvey	England	MF	1963–1974	386	24	Manager 1987–1990
Fred Pickering	England	FW	1963–1967	115	70	
Ray Wilson	England	FB	1964–1969	153	0	1966 World Cup winner
Jimmy Husband	England	FW	1964–1973	197	55	
Tommy Wright	England	FB	1964–1974	374	4	
John Hurst	England	MF	1964–1976	388	34	
Alan Ball	England	MF	1966–1971	250	78	1966 World Cup winner
Joe Royle	England	FW	1966–1974	276	119	Manager 1994–1997
Howard Kendall	England	MF	1967–1974	275	30	Club captain 1971–1974, Manager 1981–87, 1990–93, 1997–98
Terry Darracott	England	FB	1967–1979	178	0	
Roger Kenyon	England	CB	1967–1979	308	9	
Dai Davies	Wales	GK	1970–1977	94	0	
Henry Newton	England	MF	1970–1973	85	6	Everton's record signing at the time.
John Connolly	Scotland	FW	1972–1976	118	16	
Mick Buckley	England	MF	1971–1977	158	12	
Mick Lyons	England	CB	1971–1981	462	59	
Mike Bernard	England	MF	1972–1976	172	8	
David Lawson	England	GK	1972–1976	152	0	
Dave Clements	Northern Ireland	FB	1973–1975	99	8	Club captain 1974–1975
Bob Latchford	England	FW	1973–1980	289	138	Top Football League goalscorer in 1977–78
George Telfer	England	FW	1973–1980	113	22	
Jim Pearson	Scotland	FW	1974–1977	126	19	
Martin Dobson	England	MF	1974–1978	231	39	
Dave Jones	England	FB	1975–1978	103	2	
Andy King	England	MF	1976–1980, 1982–1984	247	68	
Mark Higgins	England	CB	1976–1984	181	6	Club captain 1982
John Bailey	England	FB	1979–1986	222	3	
George Wood	Scotland	GK	1977–1980	126	0	
Trevor Ross	Scotland	MF	1977–1983	151	20	
Billy Wright	England	CB	1977–1983	198	10	Club captain 1977–1982
Peter Eastoe	England	FW	1979–1982	115	33	
Asa Hartford	Scotland	FW	1979–1981	98	7	Everton's record signing at the time.
Kevin Ratcliffe	Wales	CB	1980–1991	494	2	Club captain 1982–1992
Graeme Sharp	Scotland	FW	1980–1991	445	159	
Steve McMahon	England	MF	1980–1983	120	14	
Alan Irvine	Scotland	MF	1981–1984	80	6	Assistant manager 2002–2007
Kevin Richardson	England	MF	1981–1986	145	20	
Neville Southall	Wales	GK	1981–1997	750	0	Most all-time appearances for Everton
Derek Mountfield	England	CB	1982–1988	153	24	
Adrian Heath	England	MF	1982–1988	306	94	
Gary Stevens	England	RB	1982–1988	294	13	
Peter Reid	England	MF	1982–1988	234	13	
Kevin Sheedy	Republic of Ireland	MF	1982–1992	368	97	
Andy Gray	Scotland	FW	1983–1985	68	22	Gwladys Street's Hall of Fame member
Trevor Steven	England	MF	1983–1989	298	59	
Alan Harper	England	FB	1983–1988, 1991–1993	240	5	
Paul Bracewell	England	MF	1984–1989	143	10	
Pat Van Den Hauwe	Wales	FB	1984–1989	203	3	
Gary Lineker	England	FW	1985–1986	52	40	Top Football League goalscorer in 1985–86
Neil Pointon	England	FB	1985–1989	138	5	
Dave Watson	England	CB	1986–2000	529	38	Club captain 1992–2000; Caretaker manager 1997
Ian Snodin	Wales	FB	1987–1994	201	9	
Stuart McCall	Scotland	MF	1988–1990	141	10	
Neil McDonald	England	FB	1988–1991	123	8	
Pat Nevin	Scotland	MF	1988–1991	148	21	
Tony Cottee	England	FW	1988–1994	230	99	
Martin Keown	England	CB	1989–1992	126	0	
John Ebbrell	England	MF	1989–1997	266	19	
Peter Beagrie	England	MF	1989–1994, 1998	143	17	
Gary Ablett	England	CB	1990–1995	155	6	
Matt Jackson	England	CB	1990–1995	165	6	
Andy Hinchcliffe	England	FB	1990–1997	222	9	
Peter Beardsley	England	FW	1991–1992	95	32	One of only two players to have scored for both sides in Merseyside derbies
David Unsworth	England	CB	1991–1997, 1998–2004	355	44	
Barry Horne	Wales	MF	1992–1996	150	3	
Paul Rideout	England	FW	1992–1996	140	40	
Graham Stuart	England	MF	1993–1997	161	31	
Joe Parkinson	England	MF	1993–1999	107	4	
Daniel Amokachi	Nigeria	MF	1994–1996	54	12	Olympic gold medalist
Anders Limpar	Sweden	MF	1994–1997	82	6	World Cup bronze medalist
Duncan Ferguson	Scotland	FW	1994–1998, 2000–2006	272	72	Club captain 1997–1998
Andrei Kanchelskis	Russia	MF	1995–1997	60	20	Club record signing at the time
Craig Short	England	CB	1995–1998	114	4	
Gary Speed	Wales	MF	1996–1998	65	18	Club captain 1997–1998
Michael Ball	England	FB	1996–2000	138	8	
Nick Barmby	England	MF	1996–2000	133	23	
Paul Gerrard	England	GK	1996–2002	99	0	Everton's first £1m+ goalkeeper.
Marco Materazzi	Italy	CB	1997–1998	27	1	2006 World Cup winner
Thomas Myhre	Norway	GK	1997–2001	70	0	*Inclusion reason required*
Kevin Campbell	England	FW	1997–2005	163	51	
David Weir	Scotland	CB	1998–2007	269	11	Club captain 2005–2007
Richard Gough	Scotland	CB	1999–2001	42	1	Club captain 2000–2001
Scot Gemmill	Scotland	MF	1999–2003	107	5	
Mark Pembridge	Wales	MF	1999–2003	101	4	
Steve Watson	England	FB	2000–2005	139	16	
Thomas Gravesen	Denmark	MF	2000–2005, 2007–2008	168	12	
Gary Naysmith	Scotland	FB	2000–2007	151	7	
Alessandro Pistone	Italy	FB	2000–2007	117	1	
Leon Osman	England	MF	2000–2016	433	57	
Tomasz Radzinski	Canada	FW	2001–2004	102	28	
Alan Stubbs	England	CB	2001–2005, 2006–2008	192	7	Club captain 2001–2005
Tony Hibbert	England	FB	2001–2016	329	0	
Wayne Rooney	England	FW	2002–2004, 2017–2018	117	28	2002 UEFA European Under-17 Football Championship Golden Player
Lee Carsley	Republic of Ireland	MF	2002–2008	198	12	
Joseph Yobo	Nigeria	CB	2002–2012	259	10	Club vice-captain 2007–2012
Kevin Kilbane	Republic of Ireland	MF	2003–2006	120	5	
James McFadden	Scotland	FW	2003–2008, 2011–2012	139	19	
Tim Cahill	Australia	MF/FW	2004–2012	242	68	
Mikel Arteta	Spain	MF	2005–2011	209	35	2005–06, 2006–07 Everton Player of the Year
Phil Neville	England	FB	2005–2013	303	5	Club captain 2007–2013
Joleon Lescott	England	CB/FB	2006–2009	143	17	2007–08 Everton Player of the Year
Victor Anichebe	Nigeria	FW	2006–2013	168	26	Olympic silver medal winner; Most-used substitute in Everton history
Tim Howard	United States	GK	2006–2016	414	1	2008 US Soccer Athlete of the Year
Yakubu	Nigeria	FW	2007–2011	107	31	
Jack Rodwell	England	MF	2007–2012	109	8	
Leighton Baines	England	FB	2007–2020	420	39	2010–11 & 2012–13 Everton Player of the Year
Phil Jagielka	England	CB	2007–2019	385	19	2008–09 & 2014-15 Everton Player of the Year Club captain 2013–2019
Steven Pienaar	South Africa	MF	2007–2010, 2012–2016	229	24	2009–10 Everton Player of the Year
Louis Saha	France	FW	2008–2012	115	35	
Marouane Fellaini	Belgium	MF	2008–2013	177	33	Young Player of the Season 2008–09
John Heitinga	Netherlands	DF	2009–2014	140	5	2011–12 Everton Player of the Year
Séamus Coleman	Republic of Ireland	DF	2009–2026	435	28	2013–14 Everton Player of the Year Club captain 2019–2026
Sylvain Distin	France	CB	2009–2015	210	5	2011–12 Everton Players' Player of the Year
Ross Barkley	England	MF	2011–2018	179	27	
Kevin Mirallas	Belgium	FW	2012–2019	186	38	
Steven Naismith	Scotland	FW	2012–2016	123	25	
Gareth Barry	England	MF	2013–2017	155	5	Most Premier League appearances of all time
Romelu Lukaku	Belgium	FW	2013–2017	166	87	Everton's record Premier League goalscorer
James McCarthy	Republic of Ireland	MF	2013–2019	133	6	
Mason Holgate	Jamaica	CB	2015–2025	150	5	
Tom Davies	England	MF	2016–2023	179	7	
Idrissa Gueye	Senegal	MF	2016–2019, 2022–2026	213	8	
Dominic Calvert-Lewin	England	FW	2016–2025	274	71	
Jordan Pickford	England	GK	2017–present	321	0	
Michael Keane	England	DF	2017–present	233	16	
Gylfi Sigurðsson	Iceland	MF	2017–2022	156	31	
Richarlison	Brazil	FW	2018–2022	152	53	
Lucas Digne	France	DF	2018–2022	127	6	
Alex Iwobi	Nigeria	MF	2019–2023	140	9	
Abdoulaye Doucouré	Mali	MF	2020–2025	166	21	
Vitaliy Mykolenko	Ukraine	DF	2022–present	125	4	
James Tarkowski	England	DF	2022–present	166	7	Final goalscorer in a Merseyside derby at Goodison Park
Iliman Ndiaye	Senegal	FW	2024–2026	74	17	Final men's senior goalscorer at Goodison Park

== Club captains ==
Since 1888, 49 players have held the position of club captain for Everton. The club's first captain was Nick Ross, who captained Everton during the 1888–89 season. The longest-serving captain is Peter Farrell, who was club captain for 9 years – from 1948 to 1957. Despite his long tenure, Peter Farrell never won a trophy at Everton. Kevin Ratcliffe, who captained Everton during their most successful period in history, is Everton's most decorated captain. He won 7 trophies as captain, including 2 First Division titles, 4 Charity Shields, and 1 Cup Winners' Cup. Everton's current captain is James Tarkowski, who has been captain since Séamus Coleman left the club in 2026.

Dates	Name	Nationality	Pos.	Honours as captain
1888–89	Nick Ross	Scotland	DF/FW	
1889–91	Andrew Hannah	Scotland	DF	1 First Division title
1891–93	Johnny Holt	England	MF	
1893–94	Bob Howarth	England	DF	
1894–96	Dickie Boyle	Scotland	MF	
1896–97	Billy Stewart	Scotland	MF	
1897–98	Dickie Boyle	Scotland	MF	
1898–1900	Jack Taylor	Scotland	FW	
1900–01	Jimmy Settle	England	FW	
1901–04	Tom Booth	England	MF	
1904–05	Billy Balmer	England	DF	
1905–08	Jack Taylor	Scotland	FW	1 FA Cup
1908–10	Jack Sharp	England	FW	
1910–11	Harry Makepeace	England	MF	
1911–14	John Maconnachie	Scotland	DF	
1914–15	Jimmy Galt	Scotland	DF	1 First Division title
1919–20	Tom Fleetwood	England	MF/FW	
1920–21	Dickie Downs	England	DF	
1921–22	Jock McDonald	Scotland	DF	
1922–27	Hunter Hart	Scotland	DF/MF	
1927–29	Warney Cresswell	England	DF	1 First Division title 1 FA Cup
1929–30	Hunter Hart	Scotland	DF/MF	
1930–31	Ben Williams	Wales	DF	
1931–37	Dixie Dean	England	FW	1 First Division title 1 FA Cup; 1 Charity Shield
1937–38	Billy Cook	Ireland	DF	
1938–39	Jock Thomson	Scotland	MF	1 FA Cup
1946–48	Norman Greenhalgh	England	DF	
1948–57	Peter Farrell	Ireland; Republic of Ireland	DF	
1957–61	T.E. Jones	England	MF	
1961–65	Roy Vernon	Wales	FW	1 First Division title 1 Charity Shield
1965–70	Brian Labone	England	DF	1 First Division title 1 FA Cup
1970–71	Alan Ball	England	FW	1 Charity Shield
1972–74	Howard Kendall	England	MF	
1974–76	Roger Kenyon	England	DF	
1976–82	Mick Lyons	England	DF	
1982–83	Billy Wright	England	MF	
1983–84	Mark Higgins	England	DF	1 First Division title
1984–92	Kevin Ratcliffe	Wales	DF	2 First Division titles 4 Community Shields; 1 Cup Winners' Cup; 1 FA cup
1992–97	Dave Watson	England	DF	1 FA Cup
1997–98	Gary Speed	Wales	MF	
1998–2001	Dave Watson	England	DF	
2001–02	Kevin Campbell	England	FW	
2002–04	Duncan Ferguson	Scotland	FW	
2004–05	Alan Stubbs	England	DF	
2005–07	David Weir	Scotland	DF	
2007–13	Phil Neville	England	DF	
2013–19	Phil Jagielka	England	DF	
2019–26	Séamus Coleman	Republic of Ireland	DF	
2026–present	James Tarkowski	England	DF	
