= Bob Thompson (footballer, born February 1890) =

English footballer

Personal information
- Full name: Robert Thompson
- Date of birth: 27 February 1890
- Place of birth: Bell's Close, Scotswood, England
- Date of death: 3 July 1958 (aged 68)
- Place of death: Liverpool, England
- Position: Full back

Senior career*
Years	Team	Apps	(Gls)
- Blaydon
- Swalwell
19??–1911	Scotswood		
1911–1913	Leicester Fosse	27	(0)
1913–1921	Everton	83	(0)
1921–1922	Millwall	9	(0)
1922–1923	Tranmere Rovers	35	(5)
- * Club domestic league appearances and goals

Robert Thompson (27 February 1890 – 3 July 1958) was an English professional footballer who made 154 appearances in the Football League playing as a full back for Leicester Fosse, Everton, Millwall and Tranmere Rovers. He was a regular in the Everton team that won the 1914–15 Football League title.

== Life and career ==
Thompson was born in 1890 in Bell's Close, Scotswood, Northumberland. He was a younger son of William Dann Thompson, a cartman, and his wife, Dorothy. The 1911 Census finds him living with his widowed mother and younger brother, still in Bell's Close, and working as a sand extraction labourer.

Thompson played non-league football in the Newcastle area for Blaydon, Swalwell and Scotswood before signing for Football League Second Division club Leicester Fosse in 1911. He made his debut on 16 September in a 4–1 defeat away to Nottingham Forest, and made nine league appearances in the 1911–12 season. He appeared more often in the following season, and attracted the attention of First Division club Everton. He and team-mate George Harrison signed for Everton in April 1913 for a fee of £750 the pair.

Thompson made his first appearance on 4 October 1913 in a 2–0 win at home to Middlesbrough and was almost ever-present for the rest of the season. Having finished 15th in 1913–14, Everton won the 1914–15 Football League title as well as reaching the semi-final of the FA Cup. Thompson played in 33 of the 38 league matches and all 5 cup-ties. He acted as club captain during the First World War, giving way to Tom Fleetwood when competitive football resumed. Injury interfered with Thompson's later career at Everton: he made 17 appearances in the first post-war season but rarely played in 1920–21, new signing Jock McDonald being preferred to partner Dickie Downs at full back, and was listed for transfer.

He signed for Millwall, but made only nine appearances in the Third Division South and returned north at the end of the season to join Tranmere Rovers as captain. He played regularly, making 35 appearances in the Third Division North, and scored his first Football League goal from the penalty spot in a 4–1 defeat to Stalybridge Celtic on 2 September 1922. He retired at the end of the season and took a pub, the Albany Hotel in Kirkdale, Liverpool.

Thompson died in 1958 in Liverpool.
