= William Brown (footballer, born 1897) =

Scottish footballer

Personal information
- Full name: William Brown
- Date of birth: 10 May 1897
- Place of birth: Cambuslang, Scotland
- Position: Wing-half

Senior career*
Years	Team	Apps	(Gls)
1912–1913	Flemington Hearts		
1913–1914	Cambuslang Rangers		
1914	Partick Thistle		
1914–1928	Everton	170	(0)
1928–1930	Nottingham Forest	5	(0)
1930	Prescot Cables		
Total		175	(0)
- * Club domestic league appearances and goals

William Brown (10 May 1897–unknown) was a Scottish footballer who played in the Football League for Everton and Nottingham Forest.
