= Carl Darlington =

Welsh football coach (born 1981)

Personal information
- Date of birth: 30 December 1981 (age 44)
- Place of birth: Wrexham, Wales

Managerial career
- Years: Team
- 2011–2014: The New Saints
- 2015: Wrexham (caretaker)

Carl Darlington (born 30 December 1981) is a Welsh football coach, currently head of academy coaching at Everton. He won three consecutive Welsh Premier League titles for The New Saints from 2012 to 2014, twice winning the Welsh Cup for a double. He was caretaker manager at Conference Premier club Wrexham in 2015.

== Career ==
Born in Wrexham, Darlington was an assistant manager at Cefn Druids and Airbus UK before joining The New Saints in May 2010. When Mike Davies was promoted to director of football in April 2011, Darlington succeeded him as head coach.

In 2011–12, Darlington's first full season as manager, TNS won the Welsh Premier League and the Welsh Cup, becoming the first team to win the double since their own achievement in 2005.

In November 2013, Darlington's team achieved a full calendar year of home victories in the league at their Park Hall venue; they scored 55 goals and conceded 3 in 14 games. The 2013–14 season saw him win another double.

In December 2014, with TNS 12 points ahead in the league, unbeaten in all competitions that season and unbeaten at home for over two years, Darlington left for Wrexham, his hometown club that he had supported all his life. He was named first team coach under Kevin Wilkin. Wilkin was sacked on 30 March 2015 after losing the FA Trophy final, with Darlington taking over at a team 15th in the Conference Premier. The following day, he drew 1–1 at home to higher-ranked Dover Athletic on his debut, while stating that he did not want the job permanently. After his eight-game spell saw the team rise in the table, he expressed shock at being released in May with a year left on his contract, as new manager Gary Mills wanted his own coaching staff.

Darlington returned to TNS in December 2015 as first team coach under Scott Harrison. In May 2017, he left and rejoined Wrexham to coach for Dean Keates. His contract at the Racecourse Ground was not renewed in June 2021, after missing out on promotion to the English Football League.

In September 2022, Darlington was hired as head of academy coaching at Premier League club Everton.
