= Harry Makepeace =

English cricketer and footballer

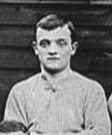
- Makepeace in 1906

Personal information
- Full name: Joseph William Henry Makepeace
- Born: 22 August 1881; Middlesbrough, England
- Died: 19 December 1952 (aged 71); Bebington, England
- Batting: Right-handed
- Bowling: Legbreak

International information
- National side: England
- Test debut: 31 December 1920 v Australia
- Last Test: 25 February 1921 v Australia

Career statistics
Competition	Test	First-class
Matches	4	499
Runs scored	279	25,799
Batting average	34.87	36.23
100s/50s	1/2	43/140
Top score	117	203
Balls bowled	–	4,055
Wickets	–	42
Bowling average	–	46.92
5 wickets in innings	–	0
10 wickets in match	–	0
Best bowling	–	4/33
Catches/stumpings	-/-	194/–
- Source: ESPNcricinfo

Joseph William Henry Makepeace (22 August 1881 – 19 December 1952) was an English sportsman who appeared for his country four times at each of cricket and football. He is one of just 12 English double internationals and the only one to have been a member of a team winning the Football League Championship, the FA Cup and the Cricket County Championship.

== Cricket ==
Makepeace played in four Tests for England in the 1920–21 Ashes series in Australia. His first-class career with Lancashire lasted from 1906 to 1930. "I count Makepeace amongst the immortals of Lancashire and Yorkshire cricket," wrote Neville Cardus. Dudley Carew described Makepeace as "a master against the turning ball on a difficult pitch", and continued:

There was little to catch the eye about his batting, but he was the most pleasing of defensive batsmen, of men whose art rises to the heights under the challenge of adversity. ... The fireworks, the rockets, and the frenzies of big hitting are admirable in their way, but cricket would not be the enchanting game it is were it not for the quiet beauty of the game's less riotous colours; Clare wrote poetry as well as Shelley, and Makepeace was of his school.

After his retirement from playing, Makepeace spent two decades as county coach.

When Albert Chevallier Tayler was preparing his 1906 painting, Kent vs Lancashire at Canterbury, he arranged sittings with the winning Kent team he was commissioned to celebrate. Tayler also intended to do include Makepeace. Makepeace however was unable to attend a sitting, so Tayler compromised by using William Findlay as the batsman. Findlay had not actually played in that particular match, but he was able to travel to Tayler's London studio as he had just been appointed as secretary of Surrey County Cricket Club.

== Football ==
Makepeace made 336 appearances and scored 23 goals for Everton between 1902 and 1919 and was a member of the team that won the FA Cup in 1906. He was also a member of the Everton team which won the First Division Championship in Season 1914–15. He made four appearances as a wing half for the England national football team between 1906 and 1912 and also represented the Football League XI. He is an inductee in Everton's Hall of Fame.

== Personal life ==
Makepeace served as a flight sergeant in the Royal Air Force during the First World War.

Sporting positions
Preceded by Jack Sharp	Everton captain 1910–1911	Succeeded by John Maconnachie
