= George Harrison (footballer, born 1892) =

English footballer (1892–1939)

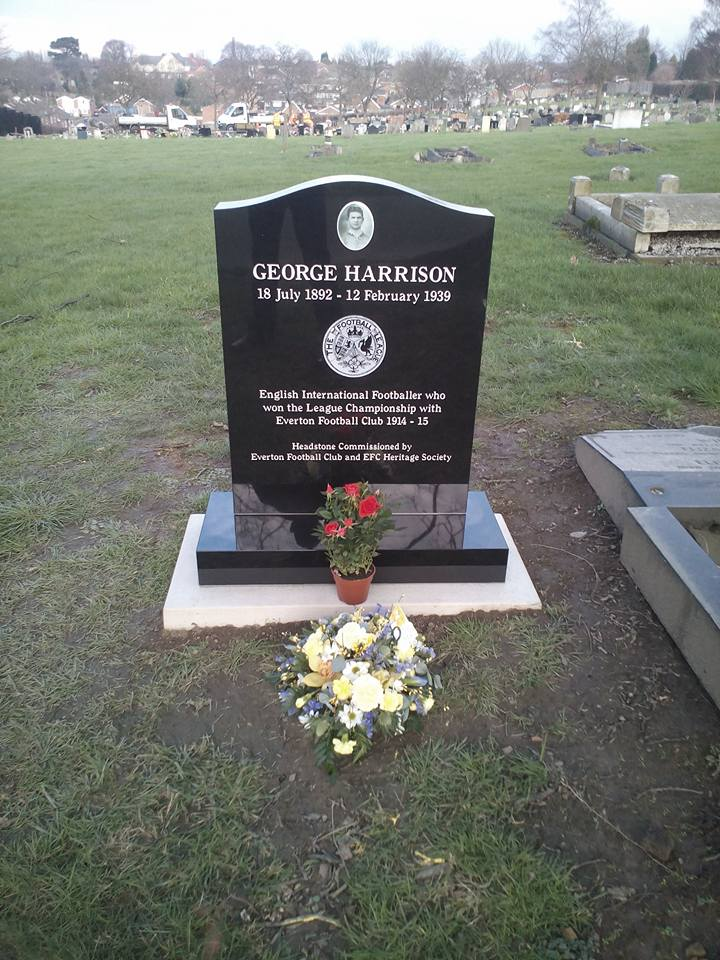
- Harrison's grave in York Road Cemetery, Church Gresley

Personal information
- Date of birth: 18 July 1892
- Place of birth: Church Gresley, England
- Date of death: 12 February 1939 (aged 46)
- Place of death: Church Gresley, England
- Height: 5 ft 7 in (1.70 m)
- Position: Outside left

Senior career*
Years	Team	Apps	(Gls)
1910–1911	Gresley Rovers	11	(1)
1911–1913	Leicester Fosse	59	(9)
1913–1923	Everton	190	(17)
1914–1916	→ Rangers (loan)		
1923–1931	Preston North End	274	(72)
1931–1932	Blackpool	16	(2)
Total		537	(101)

International career
1921	England	2	(0)
- * Club domestic league appearances and goals

George Harrison (18 July 1892 – 12 February 1939) was an English footballer who played as an outside left. He made two appearances for the England national team.

== Early and personal life ==
Harrison was born in Church Gresley in Derbyshire. He was also known as Jud Harrison. He had two older siblings, and four younger siblings. He had a son (also called George) born in June 1912, and married in May 1913.

== Club career ==
Harrison spent his early career with Gresley Rovers and Leicester Fosse. He played for Everton between 1913 and 1923. He won the First Division Championship with Everton in 1915. He was loaned to Rangers in December 1914, subsequently joining the Scots Guards. His football career was interrupted by World War One; Harrison joined the Army in February 1916 and served as a guardsman, being demobilised in October 1919. During the war he fought in the Battle of Passchendaele and was gassed. After leaving Everton in 1923 he played for Preston North End and Blackpool before retiring in 1932.

== International career ==
Harrison earned two caps for England in 1921, playing against Belgium in a 2–0 victory and against Ireland in a 1–1 draw.

== Later life and death ==
He later became the licensee of a pub in Preston and also the licensee of the Rising Sun pub in Church Gresley.

He died on 12 February 1939 aged 46, with his funeral being held in Church Gresley four days later. He had been found by his son with throat wounds in the bathroom, and an inquest ruled the death as suicide, as he suffered from depression.
