= Tom Booth =

England international footballer

Personal information
- Full name: Thomas Edward Booth
- Date of birth: 25 April 1874
- Place of birth: Ardwick, Manchester, England
- Date of death: 7 September 1939 (aged 65)
- Place of death: Blackpool, England
- Position: Centre-half

Youth career
- Hooley Hill
- Ashton North End

Senior career*
Years	Team	Apps	(Gls)
1896–1900	Blackburn Rovers	111	(10)
1900–1908	Everton	175	(9)
1908	Preston North End	0	(0)
1908–1909	Carlisle United		

International career
1898–1903	England	2	(0)
- * Club domestic league appearances and goals

Thomas Edward Booth (25 April 1874 – 7 September 1939) was an English footballer who played at centre-half for Blackburn Rovers and Everton. He also made two appearances for England in March 1898 and April 1903.

== Personal life ==
Booth was born in Ardwick, Manchester, the youngest of seven children to Isaac and Sarah Booth. His father was an accounts clerk.

Booth married Mary Elizabeth Brierley in September 1910.

== Football career ==
Booth played youth football with Hooley Hill and Ashton North End before joining Blackburn Rovers in 1896. He soon developed into "a dependable centre-back" and was called up for England for the Home Championship match against Wales played at Wrexham's Racecourse Ground on 28 March 1898. The match ended in a 3–0 victory for England, with two goals from Fred Wheldon.

The previous November, Booth was a member of the Football League side that defeated the Irish League 8–1 at Hyde Road, Manchester. Booth ended the 1897–98 season having scored six league goals, as Blackburn Rovers finished a "disappointing season" in the penultimate position in the league table. Despite finishing at the bottom of the play-offs, Blackburn avoided relegation to the Second Division as the First Division was expanded to 18 clubs.

In 1900, Blackburn Rovers were in financial difficulties and Booth was one of a number of players who were sold to raise funds. In his four years at Blackburn, Booth scored ten goals in 111 league matches.

Booth joined Everton where his arrival was expected to "materially strengthen" "the half backs division". He made his debut on 3 September 1900 in a 2–1 victory at Preston North End; his performance was praised in the match report in The Liverpool Mercury:

Booth had been putting in useful work and kept his forwards well occupied.

At halfback most interest was centred in Booth, and it may at once be stated that he proved himself as resourceful as ever, and kept the front line well employed all through. When danger threatened he anticipated its quarter. . . and avoiding aimless kicking always placed the ball to the best advantage. The value of his work cannot be overestimated, and his inclusion will undoubtedly tend to cement the attractive style of play between forwards and halves that football spectators of to-day delight in.

His second and last international appearance came five years after his first, against Scotland on 4 April 1903; the match was played at Bramall Lane, Sheffield and was won by the Scots, 2–1. Three weeks earlier, Booth had also represented the Football League against the Scottish League, with the English winning 3–0.

In 1906, Booth was part of the Everton team that reached the final of the FA Cup, including scoring in the 4–3 victory over Sheffield Wednesday in Round 4; however, injury prevented him taking part in the final itself, in which Everton defeated Newcastle United 1–0. Everton also reached the final in the following year, with Booth again sitting out the final which was lost 2–1 to Sheffield Wednesday.

Booth remained with Everton for one further season, before being released in the summer of 1908. In his eight years with Everton, he had made a total of 185 first-team appearances, scoring 11 goals.

He then joined Preston North End but moved on to Carlisle United without making an appearance for Preston. After a year at Carlisle, he retired in 1909.

== Later life ==
Following his retirement, Booth ran the Red Lion Hotel in Audenshaw with his wife, Mary.

He died in Blackpool on 7 September 1939.

Sporting positions
Preceded by Jimmy Settle	Everton captain 1901–1904	Succeeded by William Balmer
