= Ben Williams (footballer, born 1900) =

Welsh footballer

Personal information
- Full name: Benjamin David Williams
- Date of birth: 29 October 1900
- Place of birth: Penrhiwceiber, Wales
- Date of death: 5 January 1968 (aged 67)
- Height: 5 ft 7 1/2 in (1.71 m)
- Position: Full back

Senior career*
| Years | Team | Apps | (Gls) |
- Penrhiwceiber
| 1925–1930 | Swansea Town | 101 | (0) |
| 1930–1936 | Everton | 130 | (0) |
| 1936–1937 | Newport County | 18 | (0) |
| Total | | 249 | (0) |

International career
| 1927–1935 | Wales | 10 | (0) |
- * Club domestic league appearances and goals

Benjamin David Williams (29 October 1900 – 5 January 1968) was a Welsh international footballer who made 249 appearances in the English League playing as a full back for Swansea Town, Everton and Newport County.

== Sale of medal ==
In May 2005, his Second Division Championship winning medal was sold for £1,900 at auction.
