= Norman Greenhalgh =

English footballer

Personal information
- Date of birth: 10 August 1914
- Place of birth: Bolton, England
- Date of death: 1995 (aged 80–81)
- Height: 5 ft 9 in (1.75 m)
- Position: Left back

Senior career*
| Years | Team | Apps | (Gls) |
| 1933–1935 | Bolton Wanderers | 0 | (0) |
| 1935–1937 | New Brighton | 77 | (8) |
| 1937–1949 | Everton | 109 | (1) |
| 1949–19?? | Bangor City | | |

International career
| | The Football League XI | 1 | (0) |
| 1939 | England (wartime) | 1 | (0) |
- * Club domestic league appearances and goals

Norman H. Greenhalgh (10 August 1914 – 1995) was an English footballer who played as a left back in the Football League with New Brighton and Everton either side of World War II.

Greenhalgh started his career with his local club, Bolton Wanderers, but failed to break through into the first team. In 1935 he moved to New Brighton, where he suffered with appendicitis; after making a full recovery, he re-discovered his form and was sold to Everton. He made his Everton debut on 29 January 1938, and soon formed an effective partnership with Billy Cook. They helped Everton win the Football League title in 1938–39 before his career was interrupted by the war.

Having already appeared for the Football League, he was selected to represent England in a wartime international against Scotland at Newcastle's St James' Park on 2 December 1939; England won 2–1 with goals from Henry Clifton and Tommy Lawton.

He remained at Goodison Park until 1949, making a total of 115 appearances before moving to non-league Bangor City on a free transfer.

Sporting positions
| Preceded by None (due to outbreak of the Second World War) | Everton captain 1946-1948 | Succeeded by Peter Farrell |
