= Hunter Hart =

Scottish footballer and manager

Personal information
- Full name: Hunter Hart
- Date of birth: March 11, 1897
- Place of birth: Glasgow, Scotland
- Date of death: February 19, 1952 (aged 54)
- Position: Wing half

Senior career*
Years	Team	Apps	(Gls)
- Airdrieonians F.C. (1878)
1922–1930	Everton F.C.	300	(5)
- * Club domestic league appearances and goals

Hunter Hart (11 March 1897 – 19 February 1952) was a Scottish footballer who played for Everton in the Football League for most of the 1920s. He was born in Glasgow and played mainly as a wing half.

He started as a left-half but switched to the centre of defence before the end of his career. He was transferred from Airdrieonians for £4000 in 1922. Hart was made captain for a while and helped the club to avoid relegation, and was at the club when they won the 1927–28 league championship. He retired just after Christmas during the 1929–30 season, when Everton were ultimately relegated.

In total, he made 300 senior appearances for Everton (scoring on 5 occasions).
