= John Maconnachie =

Scottish footballer and manager (1885-1956)

Personal information
- Full name: John Smith Jackson Maconnachie
- Date of birth: 8 May 1885
- Place of birth: Aberdeen, Scotland
- Date of death: 1956 (aged 70–71)
- Position: Defender

Senior career*
| Years | Team | Apps | (Gls) |
| –1903 | Glasgow Perthshire | | |
| 1903–1907 | Hibernian | 78 | (6) |
| 1907–1920 | Everton | 245 | (6) |
| 1914 | → Hibernian (loan) | 1 | (0) |
| 1916 | → Djurgården (guest) | | |
| 1918 | → Shelbourne (guest) | | |
| 1920 | → Djurgården (loan) | | |
| 1920–1922 | Swindon Town | 55 | (3) |
| | Swindon Town | 1 | (0) |
| 1923 | Foleshill Great Heath | | |
- Lowestoft Town
| 1928 | Barrow | 2 | (0) |
| Total | | 382 | (15) |

Managerial career
- 1922: Djurgården
- 1926–1927: FC Zürich
- 1927–1928: Barrow
- * Club domestic league appearances and goals

John Smith Jackson Maconnachie (8 May 1885 – 1956) was a Scottish professional football player and manager.

== Career ==
Born in Aberdeen, Maconnachie spent his early career in his native Scotland with Glasgow Perthshire and Hibernian, before moving to English side Everton in 1907. Between September 1907 and May 1915 Maconnachie made 229 appearances in the English Football League, winning the competition as team captain in 1914–15 before the regular competitions were suspended during World War I, during which he served in the British Army, then as a mechanic in the Royal Air Force. He resumed his football career when the conflict was over and played one further top level season for Everton (16 league appearances, 2 goals) in 1919–20.

Maconnachie then moved to Swindon Town, making a further 55 appearances in the Football League Third Division (South) over two seasons. He moved to Sweden in 1922 to become manager of Djurgårdens IF, a club he had played for as a guest during the war, and then on loan, but soon returned to England, making one more appearance for Swindon in January 1923. In July 1926, he took over as coach of all teams at FC Zurich. He later managed Barrow between 1927 and 1928; now well into his 40s, he played twice for them in February 1928.
