= Jock McDonald =

Scottish footballer (born 1983)

Personal information
- Full name: John McDonald
- Date of birth: 11 March 1893
- Place of birth: Cleland, Scotland
- Height: 5 ft 10 in (1.78 m)
- Position: Right back

Senior career*
Years	Team	Apps	(Gls)
–1913	Shotts United		
1913–1914	Barnsley	0	(0)
1914–1917	Motherwell	2	(0)
1915–1916	→ Dykehead (loan)		
1916–1927	→ Airdrieonians (loan)	35	(0)
1917–1920	Airdrieonians	79	(3)
1920–1927	Everton	208	(0)
1927–1931	New Brighton	160	(3)
1931	Connah's Quay & Shotton		
1932	Colwyn Bay		

International career
1919	Scottish League XI	2	(0)
- * Club domestic league appearances and goals

John McDonald (born 11 March 1893) was a Scottish footballer who played as a right back for clubs including Airdrieonians, Everton and New Brighton. He was Everton captain in the 1921–22 season, and held the club record for most appearances without scoring (224) until the mark was passed by Tony Hibbert in 2011. With Airdrie, he had been selected twice for the Scottish Football League XI in 1919.
