= Everton F.C. =

Association football club in England

Everton
- Full name: Everton Football Club
- Nicknames: The Blues; The Toffees; The People's Club; The School of Science; Evertonians (supporters)
- Founded: 1878; 148 years ago
- Ground: Hill Dickinson Stadium
- Capacity: 52,769
- Coordinates: 53.4251°N 3.0028°W
- Owner: Roundhouse Capital Holdings Limited
- Chairman: Dan Friedkin
- Manager: David Moyes
- League: Premier League
- 2025–26: Premier League, 13th of 20
- Website: evertonfc.com
Home colours	Away colours	Third colours

Everton Football Club (/ˈɛvərtən/) is a professional association football club based in Liverpool, England. The club competes in the Premier League, the top tier of English football.

Founded in 1878, the club was a founding member of the Football League in 1888, and was a founding member of the Premier League in 1992, one of just three clubs to have been a founding member of both leagues. Everton are one of the oldest and most successful clubs in England, having won fifteen major trophies: nine football league titles, five FA Cups and one European Cup Winners' Cup. Everton won their first League Championship during the 1890–91 season. After winning four more League championships and two FA Cups, the club experienced a post–Second World War lull until a revival in the 1960s. A period of sustained success came in the mid-1980s, when Everton won a further two League championships, one FA Cup and the 1985 European Cup Winners' Cup. The club's most recent major trophy was the 1995 FA Cup.

Everton is the club with the second-longest continuous presence in English top-flight football, and ranks third in the all-time points rankings. As of August 2025, the club have competed in the top division for a record 123 seasons, more than any other club, having missed only four top-flight seasons (1930–31, 1951–52, 1952–53, and 1953–54).

The club's traditional kit is royal blue shirts with white shorts and socks. Everton play at the Hill Dickinson Stadium as of the 2026–27 season. Everton had played at their previous home ground Goodison Park since 1892, having moved from their original home at Anfield following a disagreement with the landowner John Houlding over their rent. The club's supporters are colloquially known as "Evertonians", the "Toffees" or the "Blues". Everton have a long-standing rivalry with nearby club Liverpool, with whom they contest the Merseyside derby. The club was owned by Farhad Moshiri, after he bought 49.9% of the club's shares in 2016. As of May 2023, the club's value was $744 million. The club's revenue and operating income for the 2022–23 season were $242 million and -$23 million respectively. In December 2024, American billionaire Dan Friedkin purchased the club.

== History ==
Chart showing the progress of Everton through the English football league system since 1889

Everton was founded as St. Domingo's FC in 1878 so that members of the congregation of St Domingo Methodist New Connexion Chapel in Breckfield Road North, Everton, could play sport year round – cricket was played in summer. The club's first game was a 1–0 victory over Everton Church Club. The club was renamed Everton in November 1879 after the local area, as people outside the congregation wished to participate.

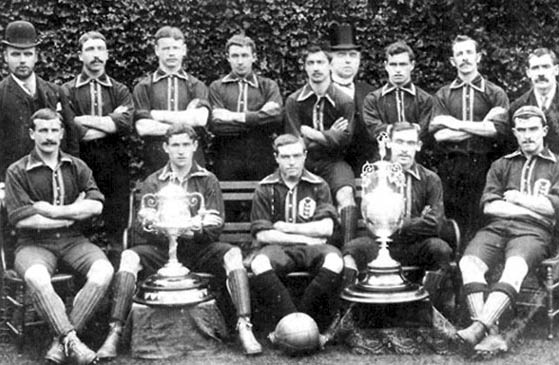
The Everton team that won the first league title in 1891

The club was a founding member of the Football League in 1888–89 and won their first League Championship title in the 1890–91 season. The 1890–91 season started in superb form with five straight victories, with Fred Geary scoring in each of the first six matches. By mid-January, Everton had completed all but one of their fixtures and were on 29 points, while Preston North End were eleven points adrift with seven games still to play. Everton than had to sit out the next two months as Preston completed their fixture list until they were only two points adrift with one match each left to play. Both teams played their final games of the season on 14 March, with Everton losing 3–2 at Burnley (Geary scored both Everton goals) and Preston going down 3–0 at Sunderland. Everton were thus able to win the Football League Championship for the first time, by a margin of two points with fourteen victories from their 22 league games. Geary had been ever-present, and was the club's top goal-scorer with 21 goals.

Everton reached four FA Cup finals before the First World War, losing 1–0 against Wolverhampton Wanderers at Fallowfield Stadium, Manchester on 25 March 1893 and 3–2 against Aston Villa at Crystal Palace on 10 April 1897 before winning at their third attempt on 20 April 1906 against Newcastle United again at Crystal Palace. Everton then reached their second successive final on 20 April 1907, however, finished in a 2–1 defeat to Sheffield Wednesday. 1914–15 was to be the final season before league football was suspended for the duration of the First World War. Everton won their second league title, one point ahead of Oldham Athletic, with Bobby Parker finishing the season as the leagues' top scorer on 35 goals. The outbreak of the First World War in 1914 interrupted the football programme while Everton were reigning champions, which was something that would again occur in 1939.

In 1925 the club signed Dixie Dean from Tranmere Rovers. In 1927–28, Dean set the record for top-flight league goals in a single season with 60 goals in 39 league games, which is a record that still stands. He helped Everton win their third League Championship that season. However, Everton were relegated to the Second Division two years later during internal turmoil at the club. The club quickly rebounded and were promoted at the first attempt, while scoring a record number of goals in the Second Division. On return to the top flight in 1931–32, Everton wasted no time in reaffirming their status and won a fourth League Championship at the first opportunity. Everton also won their second FA Cup in 1933 with a 3–0 win against Manchester City in the final. The era ended in 1938–39 with a fifth League Championship.

The outbreak of the Second World War again saw the suspension of league football, and when official competition resumed in 1946, the Everton team had been split up and paled in comparison to the pre-war team. Tommy Lawton was sold to Chelsea, Joe Mercer disagreed with the manager Theo Kelly and was sold to Arsenal, and they tried to sell T. G. Jones to Roma. Soon, only Ted Sagar was left. Under the management of the uninspired and under-financed Cliff Britton, Everton were relegated for the second time in 1950–51 and did not earn promotion until 1953–54, when they finished as the runner-up in their third season in the Second Division. The club has been a top-flight presence ever since.

Everton's second successful era started when Harry Catterick was made manager in 1961. In 1962–63, his second season in charge, Everton won the League Championship. In 1966 the club won the FA Cup with a 3–2 win over Sheffield Wednesday. Everton again reached the final in 1968, but this time were unable to overcome West Bromwich Albion at Wembley. Two seasons later in 1969–70, Everton won the League Championship, finishing nine points clear of nearest rivals Leeds United. During this period, Everton were the first English club to achieve five consecutive years in European competitions – covering the seasons from 1961–62 to 1966–67.

However, the success did not last; the team finished fourteenth, fifteenth, seventeenth and seventh in the following seasons. Harry Catterick retired, but his successors failed to win any silverware for the remainder of the 1970s despite finishing fourth in 1974–75 under manager Billy Bingham, third in 1977–78 and fourth the following season under manager Gordon Lee. Lee was sacked in 1981.

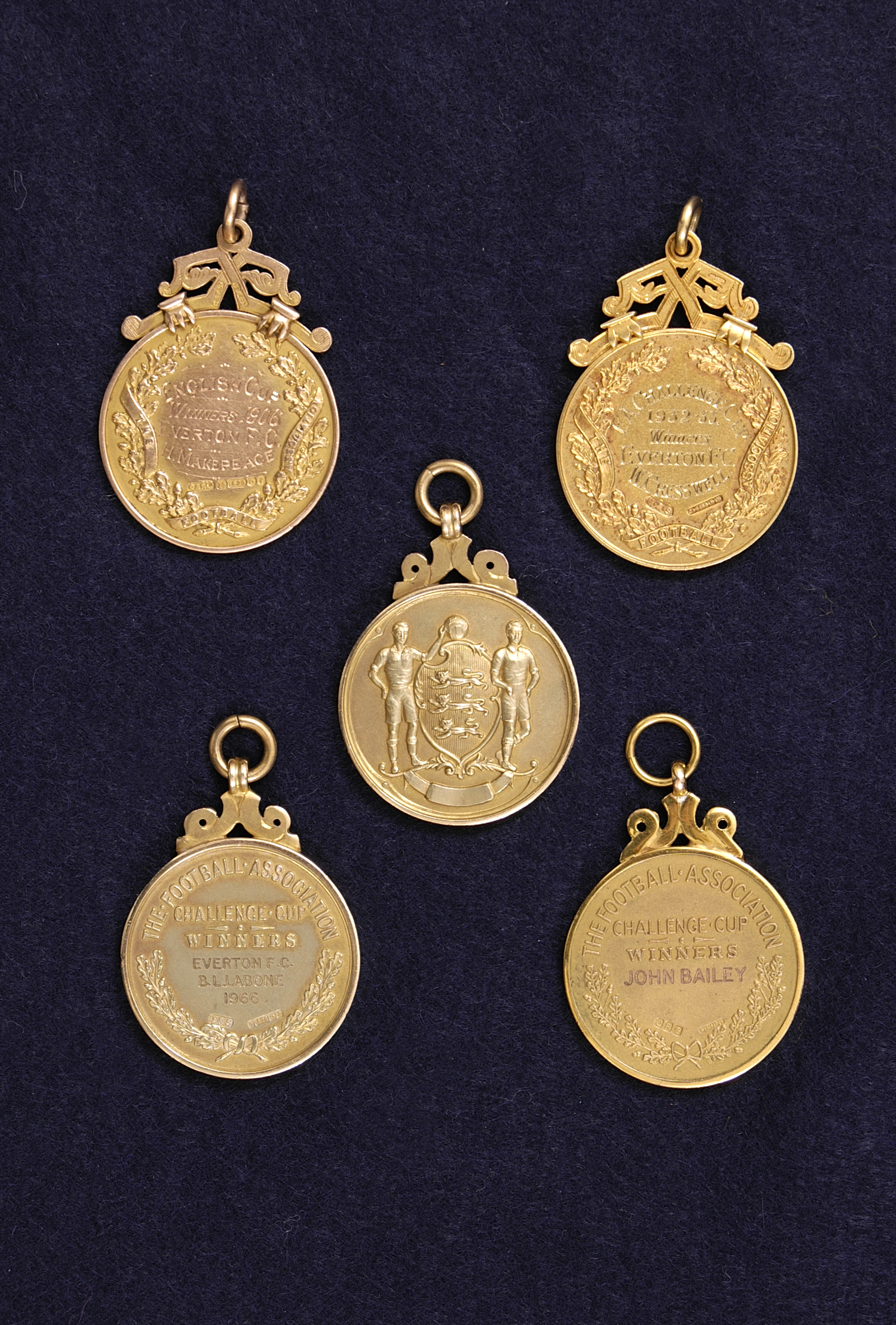
Everton's FA Cup winning medals from 1906, 1933, 1966, 1984 and 1995

Howard Kendall took over as manager and guided Everton to their most successful era. Domestically, Everton won the FA Cup in 1984 and two League Championships in 1984–85 and 1986–87. In Europe, the club won their first, and so far only, European trophy by securing the European Cup Winners' Cup in 1985. The European success came after first beating University College Dublin, Inter Bratislava and Fortuna Sittard. Then, Everton defeated German giants Bayern Munich 3–1 in the semi-finals, despite trailing at half time (in a match voted the greatest in Goodison Park history), and recorded the same scoreline over Austrian club Rapid Vienna in the final. Having won both the League and Cup Winners' Cup in 1985, Everton came very close to winning a treble, but lost to Manchester United in the FA Cup final. The following season, 1985–86, Everton was the runner-up to Liverpool in both the League and the FA Cup, but did recapture the League Championship in 1986–87.

After the Heysel Stadium disaster and the subsequent ban of all English clubs from continental football, Everton lost the chance to compete for more European trophies. A large proportion of the title-winning side was broken up following the ban. Kendall himself moved to Athletic Bilbao after the 1987 title triumph and was succeeded by assistant Colin Harvey. Harvey took Everton to the 1989 FA Cup final, but lost 3–2 after extra time to Liverpool.

Everton was a founding member of the Premier League in 1992, but struggled to find the right manager. Howard Kendall had returned in 1990, but could not repeat his previous success. His successor, Mike Walker, was statistically the least successful Everton manager to date. When former Everton player Joe Royle took over in 1994, the club's form started to improve; his first game in charge was a 2–0 victory over derby rivals Liverpool. Royle dragged Everton clear of relegation and led the club to the FA Cup for the fifth time in their history by defeating Manchester United 1–0 in the final. The cup triumph was also Everton's passport to the Cup Winners' Cup, their first European campaign in the post-Heysel era. Progress under Royle continued in 1995–96 as the team climbed to sixth place in the Premiership. A fifteenth-place finish the following season saw Royle resign towards the end of the campaign, and he was temporarily replaced by club captain Dave Watson.

Howard Kendall was appointed Everton manager for the third time in 1997, but the appointment proved unsuccessful as Everton finished seventeenth in the Premiership. The club only avoided relegation due to their superior goal difference over Bolton Wanderers. Former Rangers manager Walter Smith then took over from Kendall in the summer of 1998, but only managed three successive finishes in the bottom half of the table. The Everton board finally ran out of patience with Smith, and he was sacked in March 2002 after an FA Cup exit at Middlesbrough and with Everton in real danger of relegation. His replacement, David Moyes, guided Everton to a safe finish in fifteenth place.

In 2002–03 Everton finished seventh, which was their highest finish since 1996. It was under Moyes' management that Wayne Rooney broke into the first team before being sold to Manchester United for a club record fee of £28 million in the summer of 2004. A fourth-place finish in 2004–05 ensured that Everton qualified for the UEFA Champions League qualifying round. The team failed to make it through to the Champions League group stage and were then eliminated from the UEFA Cup. Everton qualified for the 2007–08 and 2008–09 UEFA Cup competitions, and was the runner-up in the 2009 FA Cup final. During this period, Moyes broke the club record for highest transfer fee paid on four occasions: signing James Beattie for £6 million in January 2005, Andy Johnson for £8.6 million in summer 2006, Yakubu for £11.25 million in summer 2007, and Marouane Fellaini for £15 million in September 2008.

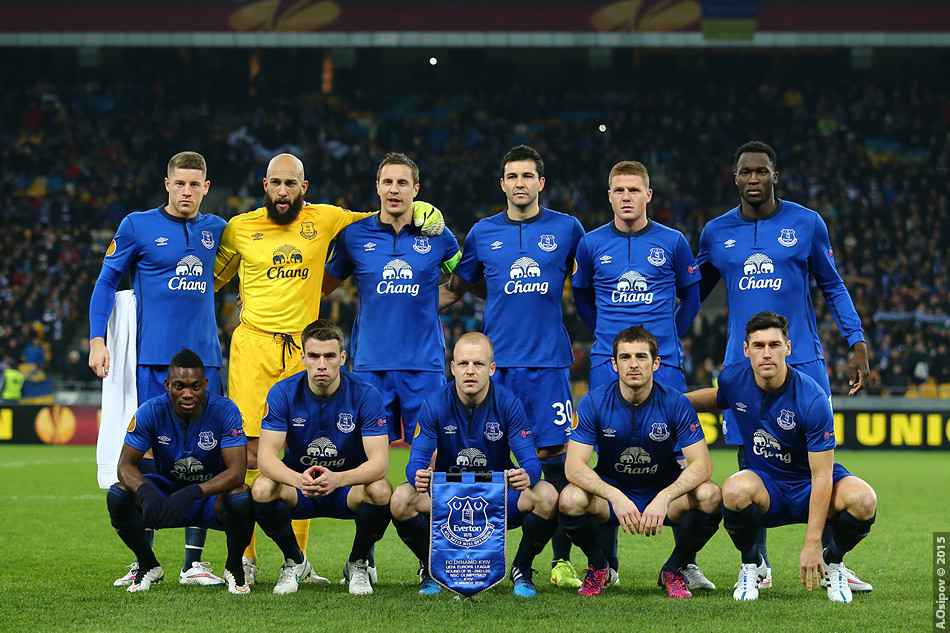
Everton squad for the UEFA Europa League round of 16 against Dynamo Kyiv in 2015

At the end of the 2012–13 season, Moyes left his position at Everton to take over at Manchester United, and was replaced by Roberto Martínez. Martínez led Everton to 5th place in the Premier League in his first season while amassing the club's best points tally in 27 years with 72. The following season, he led Everton to the last 16 of the 2014–15 UEFA Europa League, where they were defeated by Dynamo Kyiv, whilst domestically finishing 11th in the Premier League. Everton reached the semi-finals of both the League Cup and the FA Cup in 2015–16, but were defeated in both. After a poor run of form in the Premier League, Martínez was sacked following the penultimate game of the season, with Everton lying in 12th place.

Martínez was replaced in the summer of 2016 by former Southampton manager Ronald Koeman. In his first season at the club, he qualified for the Europa League, but a poor start to the 2017–18 season left Everton in the relegation zone after nine games, and Koeman was sacked on 23 October following a 5–2 home defeat to Arsenal. Sam Allardyce succeeded him, but he resigned at the end of the season amid fan discontent at his style of play.

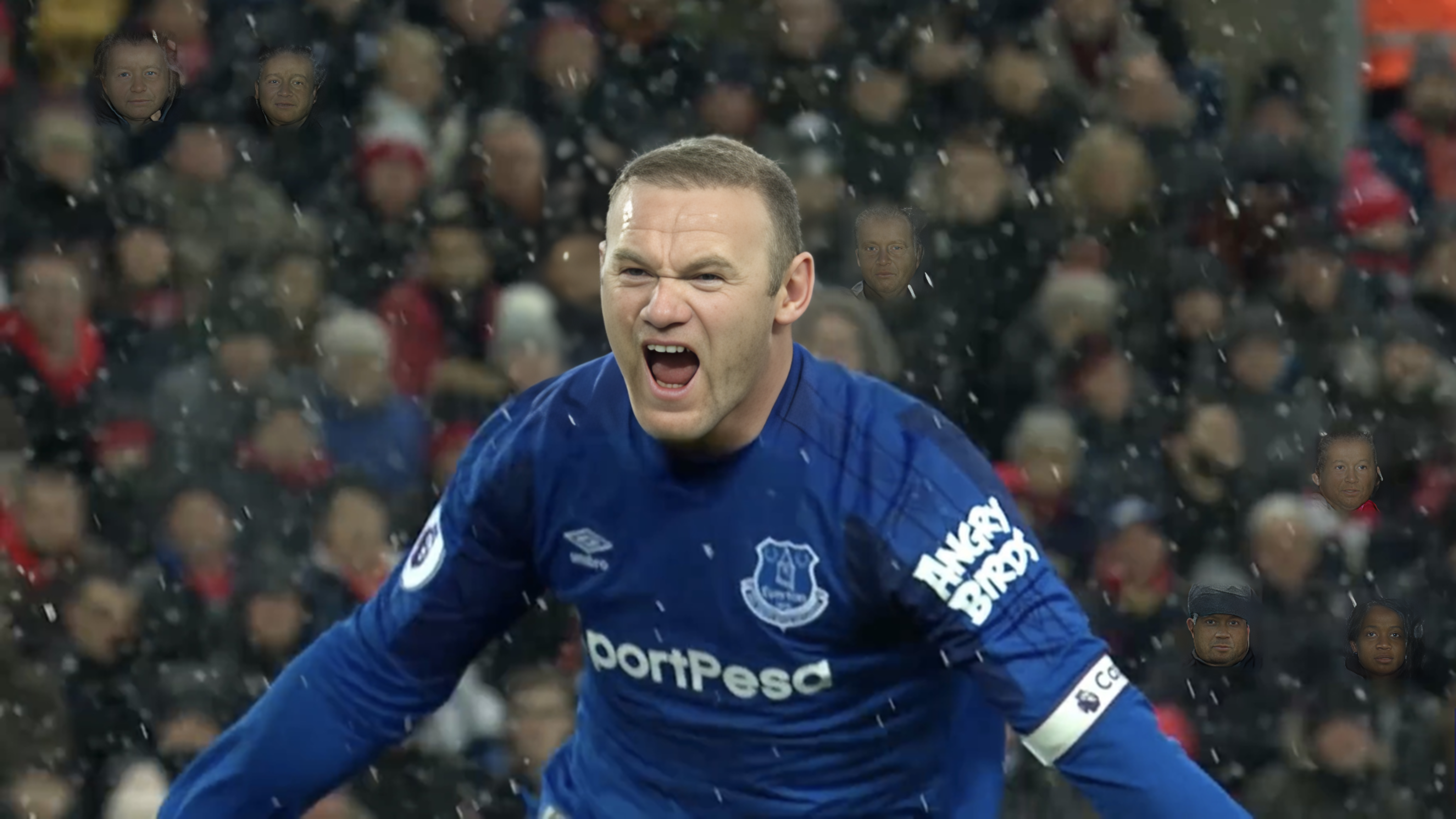
Wayne Rooney, who returns to the club after becoming Manchester United's record goalscorer, celebrates for Everton after his goal against Liverpool in the 2017–18 Premier League.

Marco Silva was named Everton manager in May 2018. In November that year, the club was banned from signing academy football players from their youth clubs for two years. Silva led Everton to finish eighth in his first season in charge, but after a poor start to the following season which left the team in the relegation zone, he was sacked on 5 December 2019. His last league match was a 5–2 loss to Liverpool at Anfield. Former player and first-team coach Duncan Ferguson stepped in as caretaker manager for the next three games before his replacement, Carlo Ancelotti; Ferguson stayed as assistant manager.

Ancelotti left the club in June 2021 to rejoin former club Real Madrid as manager, having led the club to a tenth-place finish in his only full season at the club. Former Liverpool manager Rafael Benítez was appointed as his replacement, subsequently becoming only the second person to manage both Liverpool and Everton. He was dismissed in January 2022 following nine losses in his last 13 games in charge at the club, and was replaced by former Chelsea boss Frank Lampard. Lampard was later also dismissed in January 2023 after a poor run of results. Everton narrowly escaped relegation with a 1–0 win over Bournemouth in their last game of the 2022–23 Premier League under the management of new boss Sean Dyche.

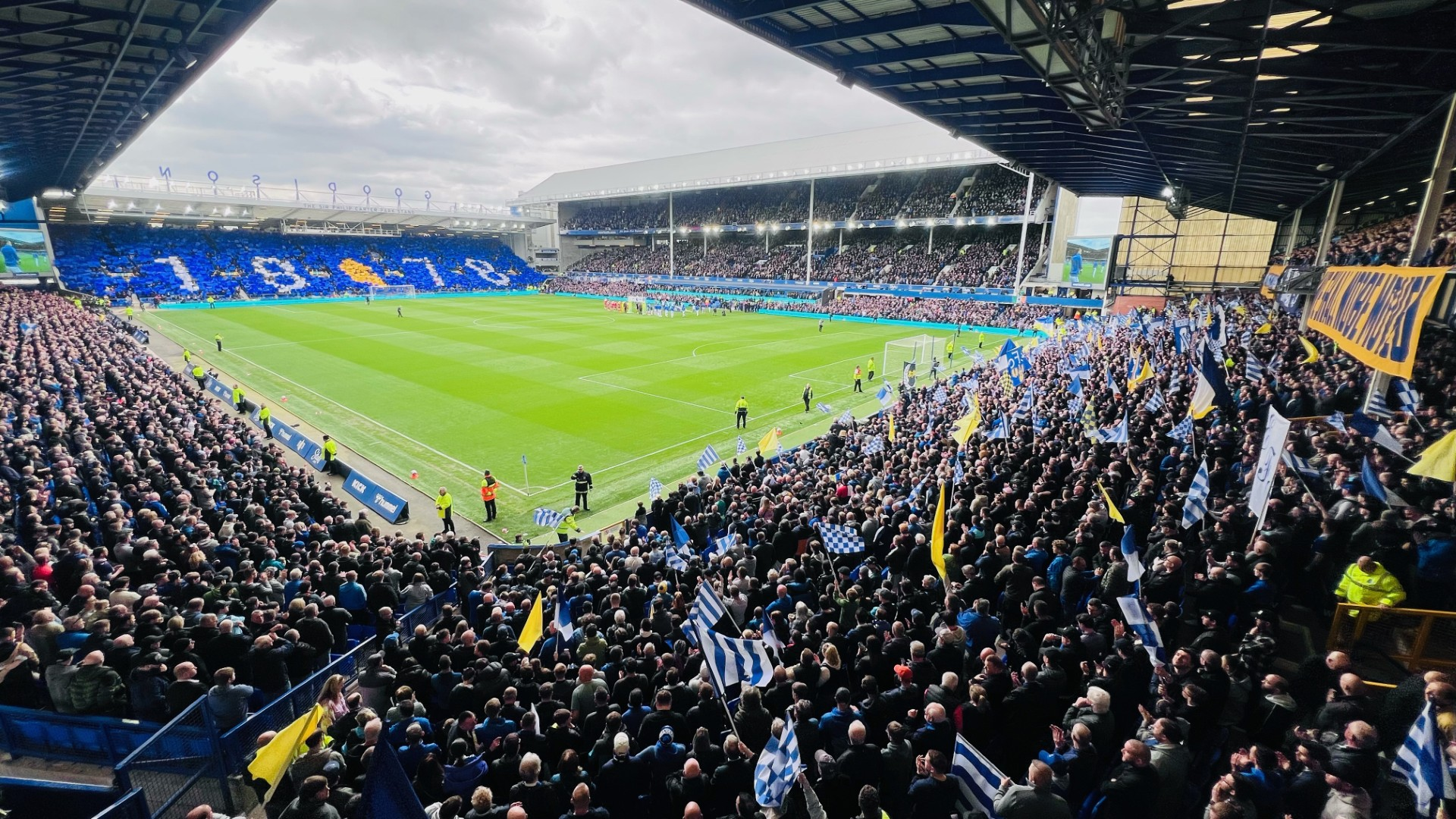
Everton playing against Nottingham Forest at Goodison Park, 21 April 2024

On 17 November 2023, the club received a ten-point deduction with immediate effect for breaches of the Premier League's profit and sustainability rules. The club had made losses of £124.5 million in the three years up to 2021–22, with the limit being £105 million. It was the biggest points deduction in Premier League history, surpassing the nine taken from Portsmouth in 2010. Everton submitted an appeal to the decision, arguing that the commission was biased and that the punishment was excessive and unfair. On 24 January 2024, Everton were charged with further breaches of Premier League financial rules after "sustaining losses above the permitted thresholds for the assessment period ending season 2022–23".

On 9 January 2025, Dyche was relieved of his duties with Everton one point above the relegation zone, and David Moyes returned to the club after almost twelve years away.

== Colours and badge ==
Everton's first home colours

Everton's traditional home colours are royal blue shirts, white shorts and white socks. However, during the first decades of their history, Everton had several different kit colours. The team originally played in white and then blue and white stripes, but as new players arriving at the club wore their old team's shirts during matches, confusion soon ensued. It was decided that the shirts would be dyed black, both to save on expenses and to instill a more professional look. However, the kit appeared morbid, so a scarlet sash was added. When the club moved to Goodison Park in 1892, the colours were salmon pink and dark blue striped shirts with dark blue shorts. The club later switched to ruby shirts with blue trim and dark blue shorts. Royal blue jerseys with white shorts were first used in the 1901–02 season. The club played in sky blue in 1906; however, the fans protested, and the colour reverted to royal blue. Occasionally, Everton have played in lighter shades than royal blue (such as in 1930–31 and 1997–98). The home kit today is royal blue shirts with white shorts and socks. The club may also wear all blue to avoid any colour clashes. Everton's traditional away colours were white shirts with black shorts, but from 1968 amber shirts and royal blue shorts became common. Various editions appeared throughout the 1970s and 1980s. Black, white, grey, and yellow away shirts have also been used.

Monochrome Everton crest (2000–2013)

2013–14 season crest

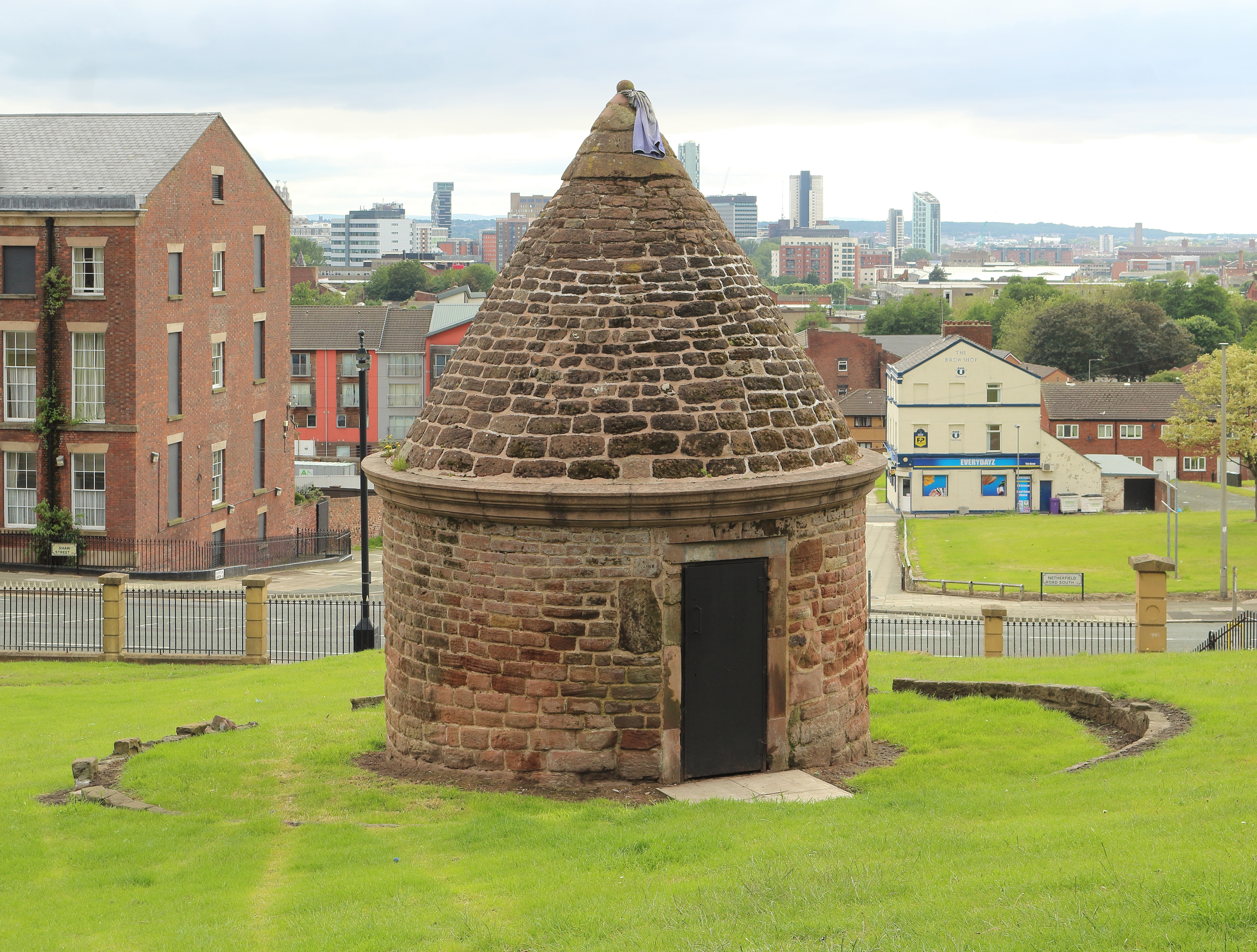
The Everton Lock-Up has featured on Everton's crest since 1938.

At the end of the 1937–38 season, Everton secretary Theo Kelly, who later became the club's first manager, wanted to design a club necktie. It was agreed that the colour be blue, and Kelly was given the task of designing a crest to be featured on the necktie. He worked on it for four months until deciding on a reproduction of Everton Lock-Up, which stands in the heart of the Everton district. The Lock-Up has been linked with the Everton area since its construction in 1787. It was originally used as a bridewell to incarcerate mainly drunks and minor criminals and it still stands on Everton Brow. The Lock-Up was accompanied by two laurel wreaths on either side and, according to the College of Arms in London, Kelly chose to include the laurels as they were the sign of winners. The crest was accompanied by the club motto, "Nil satis nisi optimum", meaning "Nothing but the best is good enough". The ties were first worn by Kelly and the Everton chairman, Mr. E. Green, on the first day of the 1938–39 season.

The club rarely incorporated a badge of any description on their shirts. An interwoven "EFC" design was adopted between 1922 and 1930, before the club reverted to plain royal blue shirts until 1972, when bold "EFC" lettering was added. The crest designed by Kelly was first used on the team's shirts in 1978 and has remained there ever since, while undergoing gradual change to become the version used today.

In May 2013, the club launched a new crest to improve the reproducibility of the design in print and broadcast media, particularly on a small scale. Critics suggested that it was external pressure from sports manufacturer Nike that evoked the redesign as the number of colours had been reduced and the radial effect was removed, which made the kit more cost efficient to reproduce. The redesign was poorly received by supporters, with a poll on an Everton fan site registering a 91% negative response to the crest. A protest petition reached over 22,000 signatures before the club offered an apology and announced a new crest would be created for the 2014–15 season with an emphasis on fan consultation. Shortly afterwards, the Head of Marketing left the club. The latest crest was revealed by the club on 3 October 2013. After a consultation process with the supporters, three new crests were shortlisted. In the final vote, the new crest was chosen by almost 80% of the supporters that took part and began being used in July 2014.

=== Nickname ===
Everton's most widely recognised nickname is "The Toffees" or "The Toffeemen", which came about after Everton had moved to Goodison. There are several explanations for how this name came to be adopted with the best known being that there was a business in Everton village, between Everton Brow and Brow Side, named Mother Noblett's, which was a toffee shop that sold sweets including Everton Mints (a type of humbug). It was also located opposite the lock-up on which Everton's club crest is based. The Toffee Lady tradition, in which a girl walks around the perimeter of the pitch before the start of a game tossing free Everton Mints into the crowd, symbolises the connection. Another possible reason is that there was a house named Ye Anciente Everton Toffee House in nearby Village Street, Everton, run by Ma Bushell. The toffee house was located near the Queen's Head hotel in which early club meetings took place.

Everton have had many other nicknames over the years. When the black kit was worn, the team were nicknamed "The Black Watch" after the famous army regiment. Since going blue in 1901, the team have been given the simple nickname "The Blues". Everton's attractive style of play led to Steve Bloomer calling the team "scientific" in 1928, which is thought to have inspired the nickname "The School of Science". The battling 1995 FA Cup winning side were known collectively as "The Dogs of War". In 2002, when David Moyes arrived as manager, he proclaimed Everton "The People's Club", which has been adopted as a semi-official club nickname.

== Stadiums ==
=== Early grounds ===
George Mahon arranged for Everton to move to Goodison Park.

Everton originally played in the southeast corner of Stanley Park. The first official match took place in 1879. In 1882, a man named J. Cruitt donated land at Priory Road which became the club's home, though while the new ground was being prepared the club played at least one game at the ground at Walton Stiles (at the other end of City Road from what would become Goodison Park). Everton's first game there was played in November 1883, a 3-1 victory over Hartford St. John's; however the club's tenure there lasted just one season, before Cruitt gave them notice to quit due to concerns about noise and fan behaviour. In 1884, Everton became tenants at Anfield, which was owned by John Orrell, a land owner who was a friend of Everton member John Houlding. Orrell lent Anfield to the club in exchange for a small rent. Houlding purchased the land from Orrell in 1885 and effectively became Everton's landlord by charging the club rent, which increased from £100 to £240 a year by 1888 – and was still rising until Everton left the ground in 1892. The club regarded the increase in rent as unacceptable. A further dispute between Houlding and the club's committee led to Houlding attempting to gain full control of the club by registering the company, "Everton F.C. and Athletic Grounds Ltd". Everton left Anfield for a new ground, Goodison Park, where the men's team played until the end of the 2024-25 season. Houlding attempted to take over Everton's name, colours, fixtures and league position, but was denied by The Football Association. Instead, Houlding formed a new club, Liverpool.

=== Goodison Park ===
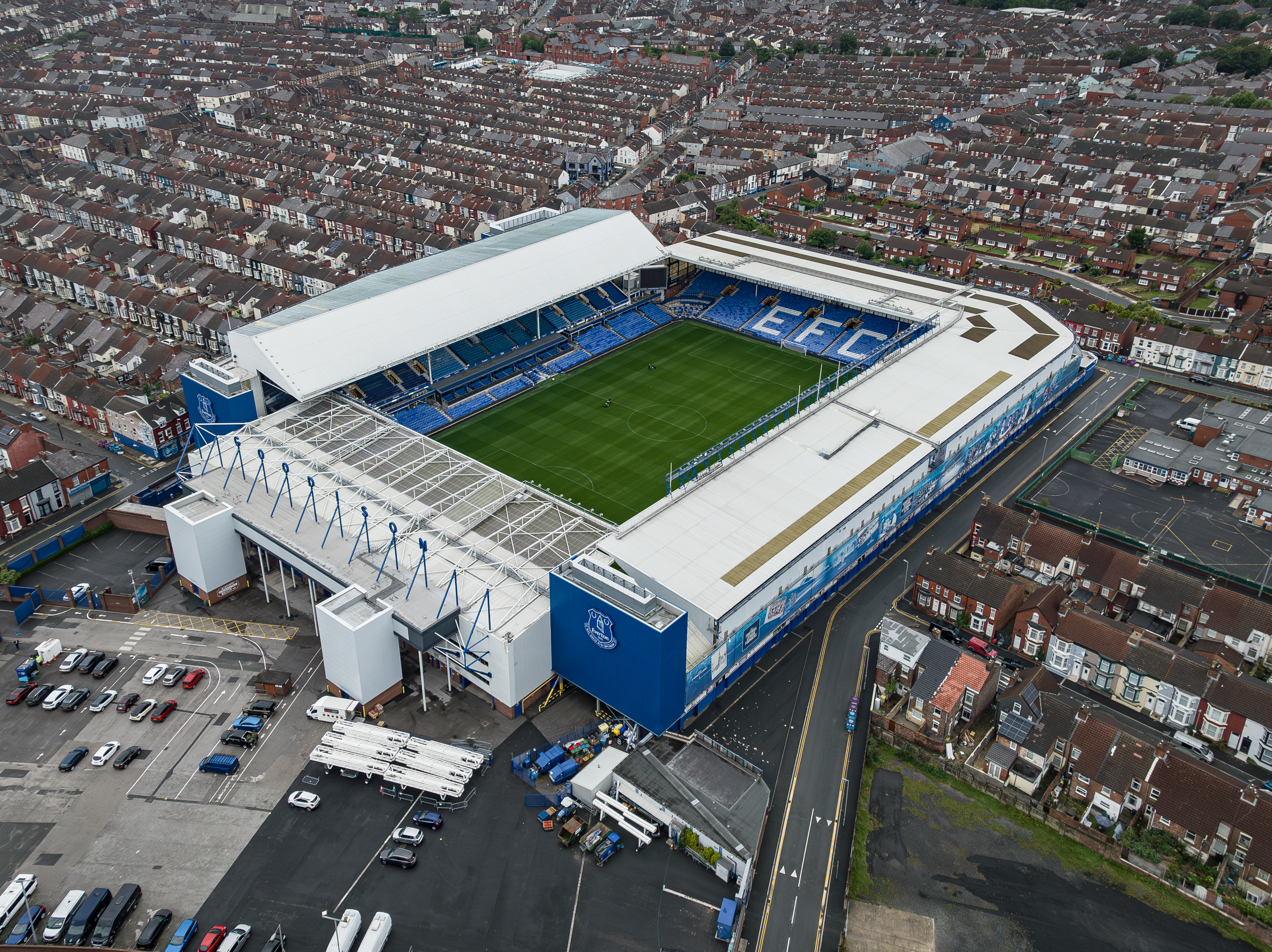
Aerial image of Goodison Park. The stadium was used by Everton from 1892 until 2025.

Goodison Park, the first major football stadium to be built in England, was opened in 1892. Goodison Park has staged more top-flight football games than any other ground in the United Kingdom and was the only English club ground to host a semi-final at the 1966 FIFA World Cup. It was also the first English ground to have under-soil heating and the first to have two tiers on all sides. The church grounds of St Luke the Evangelist are adjacent to the corner of the Main Stand and the Howard Kendall Gwladys Street End.

On match days, in a tradition going back to 1962, players walk out to the tune "Johnny Todd", played in the arrangement used when it was the theme song for Z-Cars. It is a traditional Liverpool children's song collected in 1890 by Frank Kidson and tells the story of a sailor betrayed by his lover while away at sea. On two occasions in 1994, the club walked out to different songs. In August 1994, the club played 2 Unlimited's song "Get Ready For This". A month later, the club used a reworking of the Creedence Clearwater Revival classic "Bad Moon Rising". Both songs were met with complete disapproval by Everton fans.

Starting from the 2025-26 season, Goodison Park will be home to Everton Women, as the men's team moved to the Everton Stadium. This will make it the largest dedicated women's football stadium in the UK.

=== Hill Dickinson Stadium ===
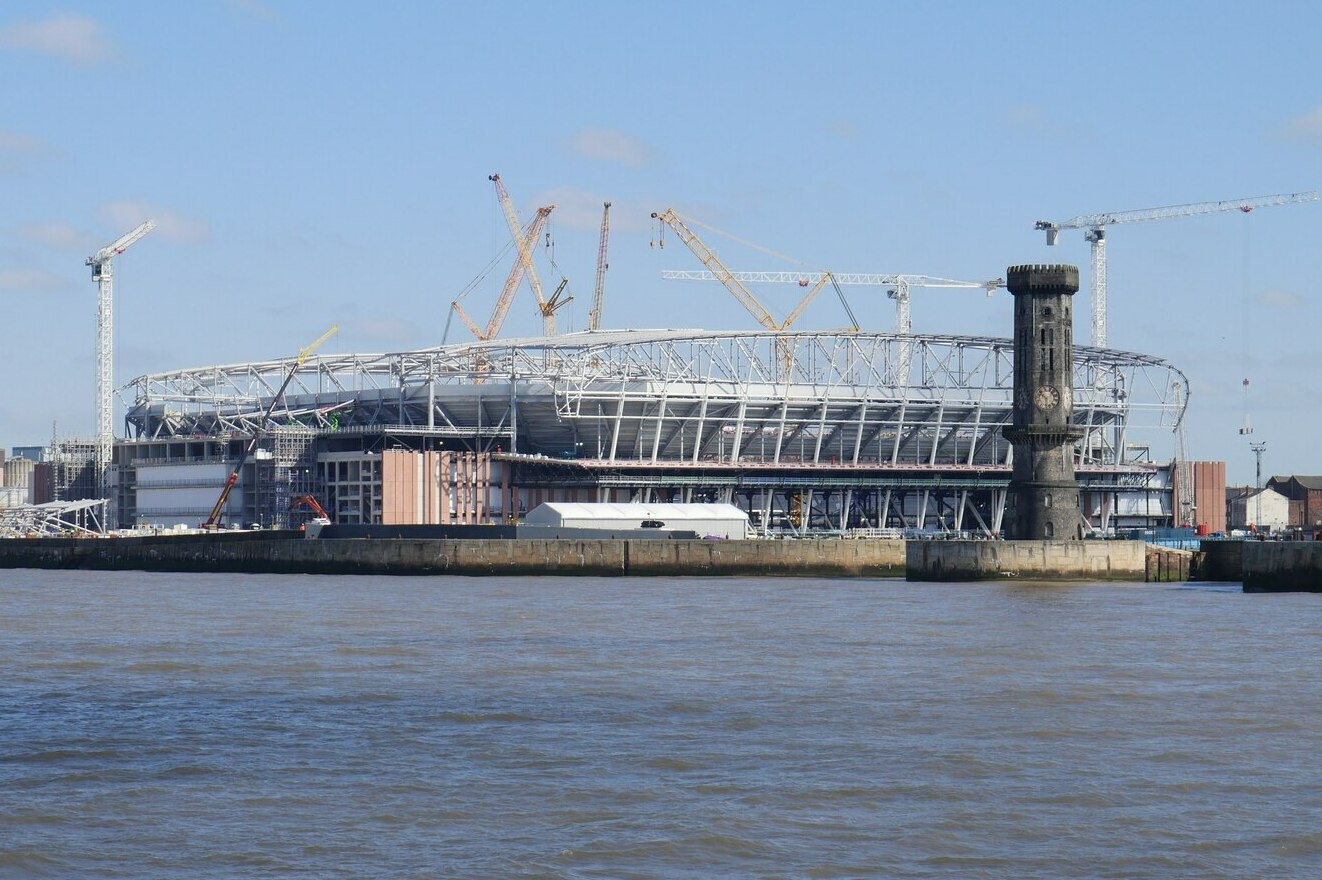
Hill Dickinson Stadium under construction in April 2023

Talks regarding a new Everton stadium began in 1996. The original plan was for a 60,000-seat stadium, followed by a proposal for a 55,000-seat stadium at King's Dock, which was rejected due to funding issues. In 2004, Everton entered talks with Liverpool about sharing a proposed stadium on Stanley Park, but negotiations broke down as Everton could not raise 50% of the costs.

Everton secured planning permission for the new Everton Stadium stadium in July 2021. Construction began in August 2021, with contractors Laing O'Rourke leading the project. The first phase involved infilling the dock with 500,000 cubic metres of sea-dredged sand and installing 2,500 vertical concrete piles. The stadium will have a capacity of 52,888 and is set to open for the start of the 2025–26 season, replacing Goodison Park, at an estimated cost of £760 million. On 16 May 2025, the stadium's first title sponsor was announced as Hill Dickinson, renaming the stadium to the Hill Dickinson Stadium.

== Training grounds ==
From 1966 to 2007, Everton trained at Bellefield in the West Derby area of Liverpool. In 2007, the club moved to the Finch Farm training complex in Halewood after acquiring it the previous year. The first team squad officially moved to the complex on 9 October 2007. The training ground is now used by both the Everton men and women's first team and the youth academy. The training ground features ten full-size grass pitches across three slabs, one of which is a floodlit pitch along with a synthetic pitch with additional floodlights and dedicated training areas for fitness and goalkeeping training, as well as a recreated Goodison Park pitch. Within the training complex, there are changing facilities for senior players and academy players. Facilities include a fitness centre, a synthetic indoor training pitch, a hydrotherapy pool, a spa, a sauna, a physiotherapy room, a media centre and a video lounge, including a video editing suite.

== Support ==
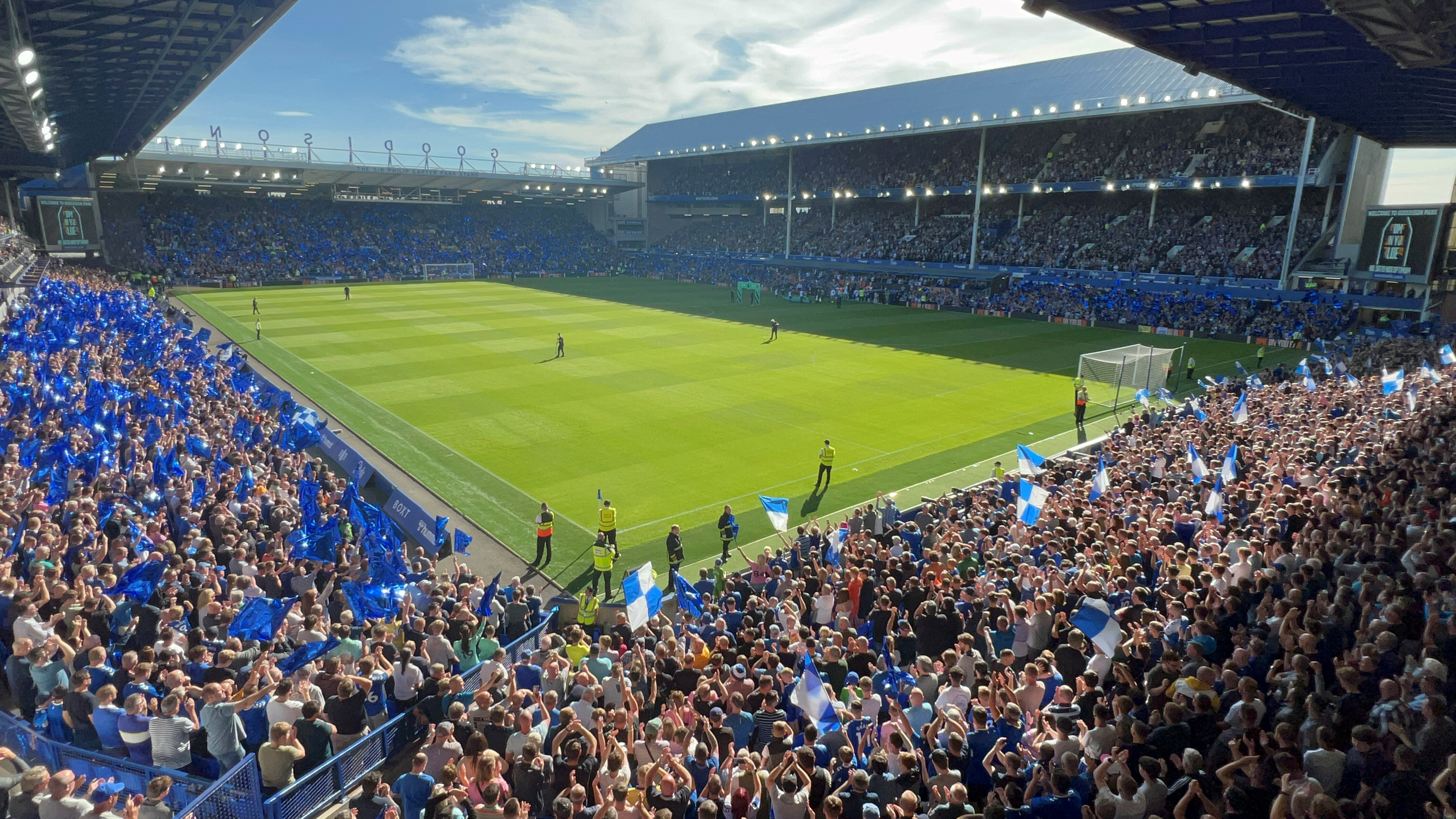
Everton supporters at Goodison Park in August 2022

Everton has a large fanbase, with the eighth-highest average attendance in the Premier League in the 2008–09 season. The club's supporters are colloquially known as Evertonians or Blues. The majority of Everton's matchday support comes from the North West of England, primarily Merseyside, Cheshire, West Lancashire and parts of Western Greater Manchester along with many fans who travel from North Wales, Ireland, and Scotland. Within the city of Liverpool, support for Everton and city rivals Liverpool is not determined by geographical basis with supporters mixed across the city. Everton also has many supporters' clubs worldwide in places such as North America, Singapore, Indonesia, Lebanon, Malaysia, Thailand, India, and Australia. Paul McCartney is an Everton supporter. The official supporters club is FOREVERTON, and there are also several fanzines including When Skies are Grey and Speke from the Harbour, which are sold around Goodison Park on match days.

Everton regularly take large numbers away from home both domestically and in European fixtures. The club implements a loyalty points scheme offering the first opportunity to purchase away tickets to season ticket holders who have attended the most away matches. Everton often sell out the full allocation in away grounds, and tickets sell particularly well for North West England away matches. In October 2009, Everton took 7,000 travelling fans to Benfica, which was their largest ever away crowd in Europe since the 1985 European Cup Winners' Cup Final.

=== Rivalries ===
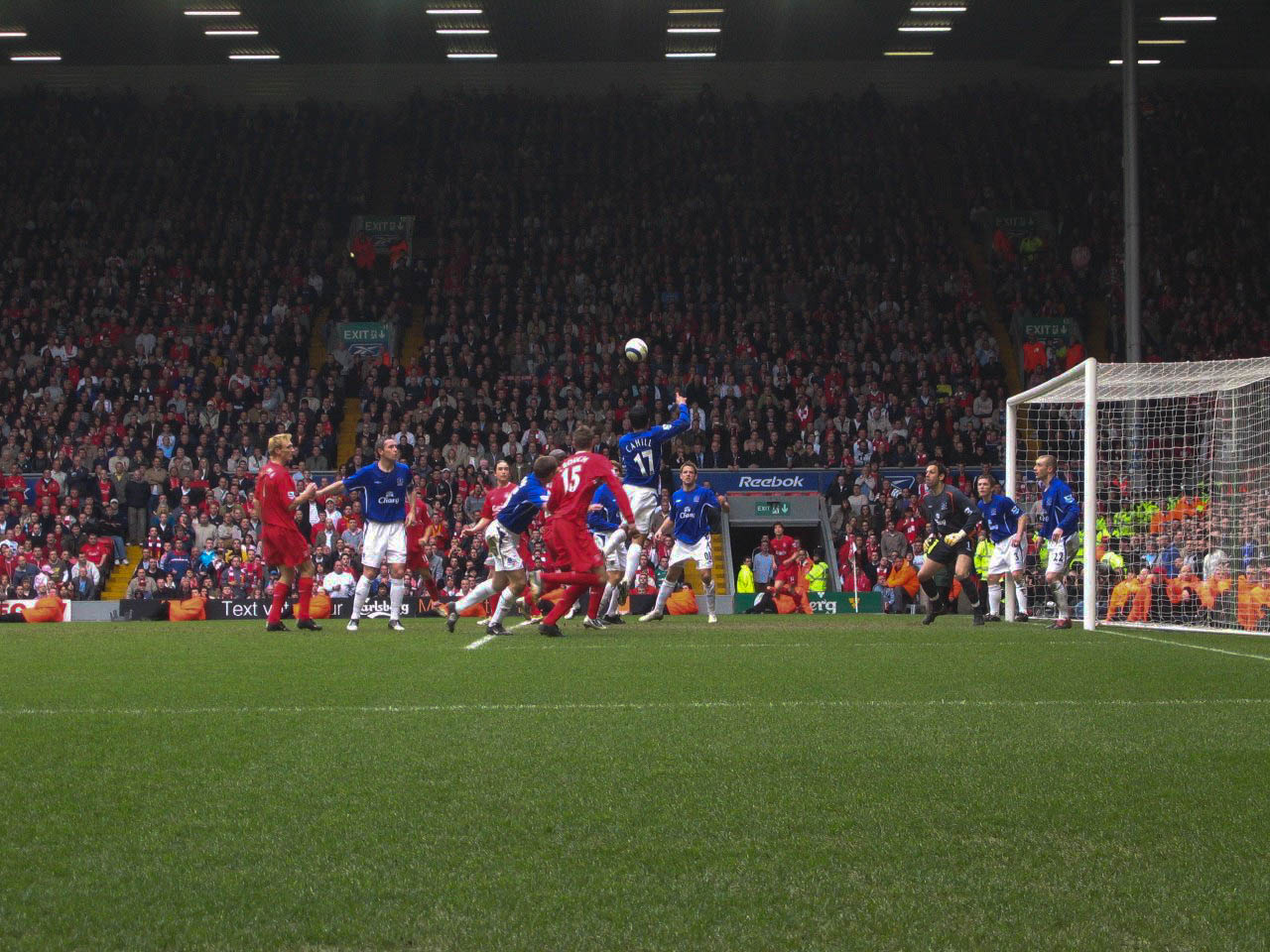
Everton playing against rivals Liverpool in the Merseyside derby, in March 2006

Everton's biggest rivalry is with neighbours Liverpool, against whom the club contests the Merseyside derby. The rivalry stems from an internal dispute between Everton officials and the owners of Anfield, which was then Everton's home ground. The dispute resulted in Everton moving to Goodison Park and the subsequent formation of Liverpool in 1892. Following these events, a fierce rivalry has existed between Everton and Liverpool, albeit one that is generally perceived as more respectful than many other derbies in English football. This was illustrated by a chain of red and blue scarves that were linked between the gates of both grounds across Stanley Park as a tribute to the Liverpool fans killed in the Hillsborough disaster. The derby is usually a sellout fixture and has been known as the "friendly derby" because both sets of fans can often be seen side by side dressed in red and blue inside both Anfield and Goodison Park. On the field, matches have tended to be extremely stormy affairs; the derby has had more red cards than any other fixture in Premier League history.

The last Merseyside derby at Goodison Park was played on 12 February 2025 and ended in a 2–2 draw.

== Ownership and finances ==
Everton is a limited company with the board of directors holding a majority of the shares. The club's most recent accounts, from March 2026, show a net total debt of £159 million, with a turnover of £196.7 million and a loss of £8.6 million. Everton agreed to a long-term loan of £30 million with Bear Stearns and Prudential in 2002 for a duration of 25 years. The loan was a consolidation of debts at the time as well as a source of capital for new player acquisitions. Goodison Park is secured as collateral. On 27 February 2016, it was announced that Farhad Moshiri would buy a 49.9% stake in the club. On 15 September 2023, Everton announced that Miami-based 777 Partners had signed an agreement with Farhad Moshiri to acquire his full 94.1% stake in the club, pending ratification by the Premier League through the owners' and directors' test. The takeover collapsed as it did not meet its deadline of 1 June 2024. This deal collapsed on 19 July 2024 due to issues in regards to debts to 777 Partners and A-Cap Holdings

On 21 June 2024, Everton announced an exclusivity agreement with the Friedkin Group, owners of Serie A club Roma. On 23 September 2024, Everton and the Friedkin Group released a joint statement that an agreement on the terms of sale had been reached pending approval from the Premier League, the Football Association and the Financial Conduct Authority. On 14 December, Friedkin officially received approval from the Premier League to acquire Everton, and five days later he officially acquired the club.

In July 2025, the club's majority owners, The Friedkin Group, launched Pursuit Sports, a dedicated multi-club management vehicle to oversee their football properties, including Everton and Roma. Pursuit Sports is led by CEO Dave Beeston and is intended to provide strategic, data-driven support across the clubs while maintaining their individual identities. In August 2025, Everton announced that they would be the first Premier League football club to commit to a living pension for all staff.

On 9 October 2026, The Friedkin Group announced that it was exploring new investment options for Everton F.C., including the potential sale of a controlling interest in the club, less than two years after its acquisition from Farhad Moshiri. The group appointed investment bank Moelis & Company to advise on the process. No timetable for a sale was announced, and The Friedkin Group stated that it would continue supporting the club while considering prospective investors.

Position	Name	Number of shares owned	Notes
Owner, Club Owner	Dan Friedkin	127,031	Bought 94.10% of Everton from Farhad Moshiri in December 2024.
Chairman	Dan Friedkin	–	–
Total amount of club owned by board members		128,781	
Chief Executive Officer/Director	Angus Kinnear	–	Appointed in May 2024 from Leeds United

Figures taken from 2013 to 2014 accounts.

Total amount of shares owned by board members will remain at 128,781 until further clarification regarding the future of late Chairman Bill Kenwright CBE's shares in the club.

=== Shirt sponsors and manufacturers ===
Since the 2026–27 season, the club's primary shirt sponsor has been the financial services company CMC Markets, as part of a main club partnership. Previous sponsors include

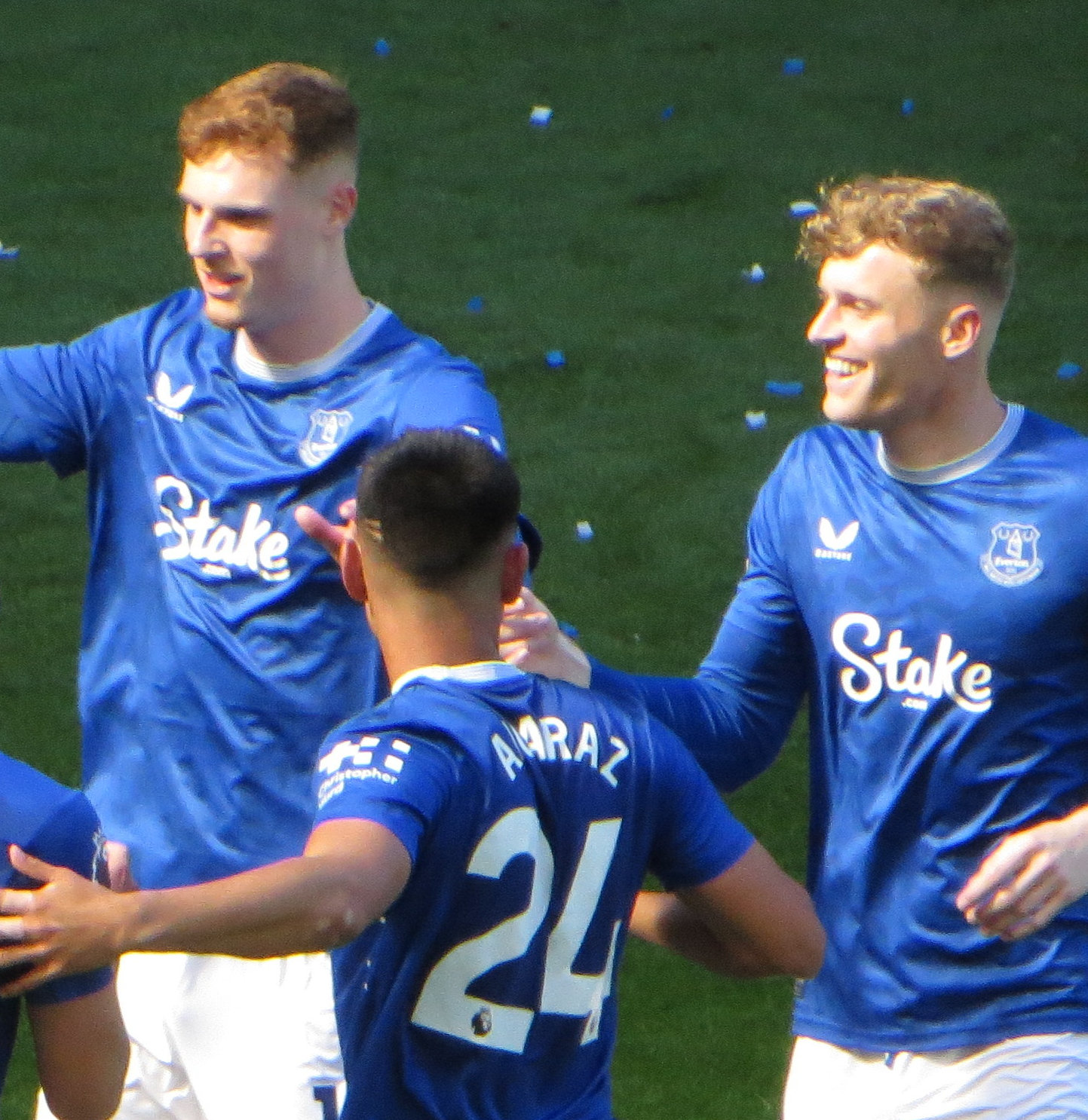
Everton's Stake branded shirts in 2025

Stake (2022–26), Cazoo (2020–2022), SportPesa (2017–2020), Chang Beer (2004–2017), Hafnia (1979–1985), NEC (1985–1995), Danka (1995–1997), one2one (1997–2002) and Kejian (2002–2004). For the 2008–09 season, Everton sold junior replica jerseys without the current name or logo of their main sponsor Chang beer, which followed a recommendation from the Portman Group that alcoholic brand names be removed from kits sold to children.

Everton's kit manufacturers from 2020 to 2024 were Hummel, after a previous deal with Umbro was terminated early by the club. Umbro have been the club's kit manufacturer four times (1974–1983, 1986–2000, 2004–2009, and 2014–2020). Other previous manufacturing firms are Le Coq Sportif (1983–1986, 2009–2012), Puma (2000–2004) and Nike (2012–2014). After Everton's contract with Hummel ended at the end of the 2023-24 season, on June 14, 2024 the club entered a multi-year agreement with UK based kit manufacturer Castore.

The club currently has two 'megastores': one located within Hill Dickinson Stadium in Vauxhall, and one located in the Liverpool One shopping complex named 'Everton Two', which gives the second store the address 'Everton Two, Liverpool One'.

=== Financial Fair Play ===
In March 2023, the Premier League referred Everton to an independent commission to investigate alleged breaches of Financial Fair Play from the 2021–2022 season. The investigation concluded in November 2023 that Everton breached Financial Fair Play regulations after reporting a loss of £371.8m over three years, where under Premier League rules, clubs are allowed to lose a maximum of £105m over three years. As a result, Everton were deducted 10 points, the heaviest punishment in Premier League history. At the time, Everton were on 14 points after 12 games, sitting 14th in the league table; the points deduction dropped Everton to 19th, in the Premier League's relegation zone. Everton said they were "both shocked and disappointed by the ruling of the Premier League's Commission" and had communicated their "intention to appeal the decision to the Premier League". Liverpool MP Ian Byrne took the ten-point deduction to the House of Commons calling for the suspension of any proceedings and sanctions, describing the deduction as "grossly unfair".

== In the community ==
Everton's community department, Everton in the Community (EitC), is a charity that provides sports and other social activities for the local community including for people with disabilities. EitC represents the club in the European Multisport Club Association.

=== Relationships with other clubs ===
Everton is connected to many other sports clubs and organisations. It has links with Irish football academy Ballyoulster United in Celbridge, the Canadian Ontario Soccer Association, and the Thai Football Association (where there is a competition named the Chang-Everton Cup, competed for by local schoolboys). The club also has a football academy in the Cypriot city of Limassol and a partnership agreement with American club Pittsburgh Riverhounds.

Everton has links with Chilean team Everton de Viña del Mar, who were named after the club. On 4 August 2010, the two Evertons played each other in a friendly match at Goodison Park named the "Copa Hermandad" to mark the centenary of the Chilean team. The occasion was organised by the Ruleteros Society, which was founded to promote connections between the two clubs. Other Everton clubs also exist in Colonia in Uruguay, La Plata and Río Cuarto in Argentina, Elk Grove in the U.S. state of California, and Cork in Ireland. There was also a team named Everton in Trinidad and Tobago. There was an Everton club in Auckland, New Zealand from 1907 to 1915 named because of the first FA Cup win.

The club owned and operated a professional basketball team by the name of the Everton Tigers, who competed in the top-tier British Basketball League. The team was launched in the summer of 2007 as part of the club's Community programme and played their home games at the Greenbank Sports Academy in Liverpool's Mossley Hill suburb. The team was an amalgam of the Toxteth Tigers community youth programme, which started in 1968. The team quickly became one of the most successful in the league by winning the BBL Cup in 2009 and the play-offs in 2010. However, Everton withdrew funding before the 2010–11 season and the team was re-launched as the Mersey Tigers.

Everton's owners also own AS Roma.

== In popular culture ==
=== Film and television ===
Ken Loach's 1969 television film The Golden Vision combined improvised drama with documentary footage to tell the story of a group of Everton fans for whom the main purpose of life—following the team—is interrupted by such inconveniences as work and weddings. Everton forward Alex Young, whose nickname was also the title of the film, appeared as himself.

Paul Greengrass's 1997 television film The Fix dramatised the true story of a match-fixing scandal in which the club's newest player Tony Kay (played by Jason Isaacs) is implicated in having helped to throw a match between his previous club Sheffield Wednesday and Ipswich Town. The majority of the story is set during Everton's 1962–63 League Championship winning season, with manager Harry Catterick played by Colin Welland.

In the 2015 Rocky film Creed, Goodison Park serves as the venue of the climactic fight scene. Footage of the stadium and crowd during a home game against West Bromwich Albion was used for the scene. Liverpool-born boxing champion Tony Bellew, a lifelong Everton fan, plays Creed's opponent and wore the Everton badge on his training gear and shorts.

=== Music ===
The club entered the UK singles chart on four occasions under different titles during the 1980s and 1990s, when many clubs each released a song to mark reaching the FA Cup Final. "The Boys in Blue", released in 1984, peaked at No. 82. The following year, the club scored their biggest hit when "Here We Go" peaked at No. 14.

In 1986, Everton released "Everybody's Cheering the Blues", which reached No. 83. "All Together Now", a reworking of a song by Liverpool band The Farm, was released for the 1995 FA Cup final and reached No. 27. By the time the club reached the 2009 FA Cup final, the tradition had largely been abandoned by all clubs and no song was released.

In 2020, Everton released the single "Spirit of the Blues", which reached number 64 in the UK charts.

== Players ==
=== First-team squad ===
As of 2 September 2026

Note: Flags indicate national team as defined under FIFA eligibility rules; some limited exceptions apply. Players may hold more than one non-FIFA nationality.

No.	Pos.	Nation	Player
1	GK	ENG	Jordan Pickford
2	MF	ENG	Ainsley Maitland-Niles
4	DF	ENG	Jarrad Branthwaite
5	DF	ENG	Michael Keane
6	DF	ENG	James Tarkowski (captain)
8	MF	ENG	Kiernan Dewsbury-Hall
10	MF	ENG	Jack Grealish (on loan from Manchester City)
11	FW	FRA	Thierno Barry
12	GK	IRL	Mark Travers
15	DF	IRL	Jake O'Brien
16	DF	UKR	Vitalii Mykolenko

No.	Pos.	Nation	Player
19	FW	ENG	Tyrique George
20	FW	ENG	Tyler Dibling
22	FW	WAL	Brennan Johnson
23	MF	DEN	Christian Nørgaard
24	MF	ARG	Charly Alcaraz
30	MF	ENG	Hayden Hackney
31	GK	WAL	Tom King
34	MF	GER	Merlin Röhl
37	MF	ENG	James Garner
45	MF	ENG	Harrison Armstrong

=== Out on loan ===
Note: Flags indicate national team as defined under FIFA eligibility rules; some limited exceptions apply. Players may hold more than one non-FIFA nationality.

No.	Pos.	Nation	Player
39	DF	MAR	Adam Aznou (at Málaga until 30 June 2027)

=== Club captains ===
Since 1888, 48 players have held the position of club captain for Everton. The club's first captain was Nick Ross, who captained Everton during the 1888-89 season. The longest-serving captain is Peter Farrell, who was club captain for nine years – from 1948 to 1957. Despite his long tenure, Peter Farrell never won a trophy at Everton. Kevin Ratcliffe, who captained Everton during their most successful period in history, is Everton's most decorated captain. He won seven trophies as captain, including two First Division titles, four Charity Shields, and one Cup Winners' Cup. Everton's most recent captain was Séamus Coleman. He had been captain since Phil Jagielka left the club in 2019.

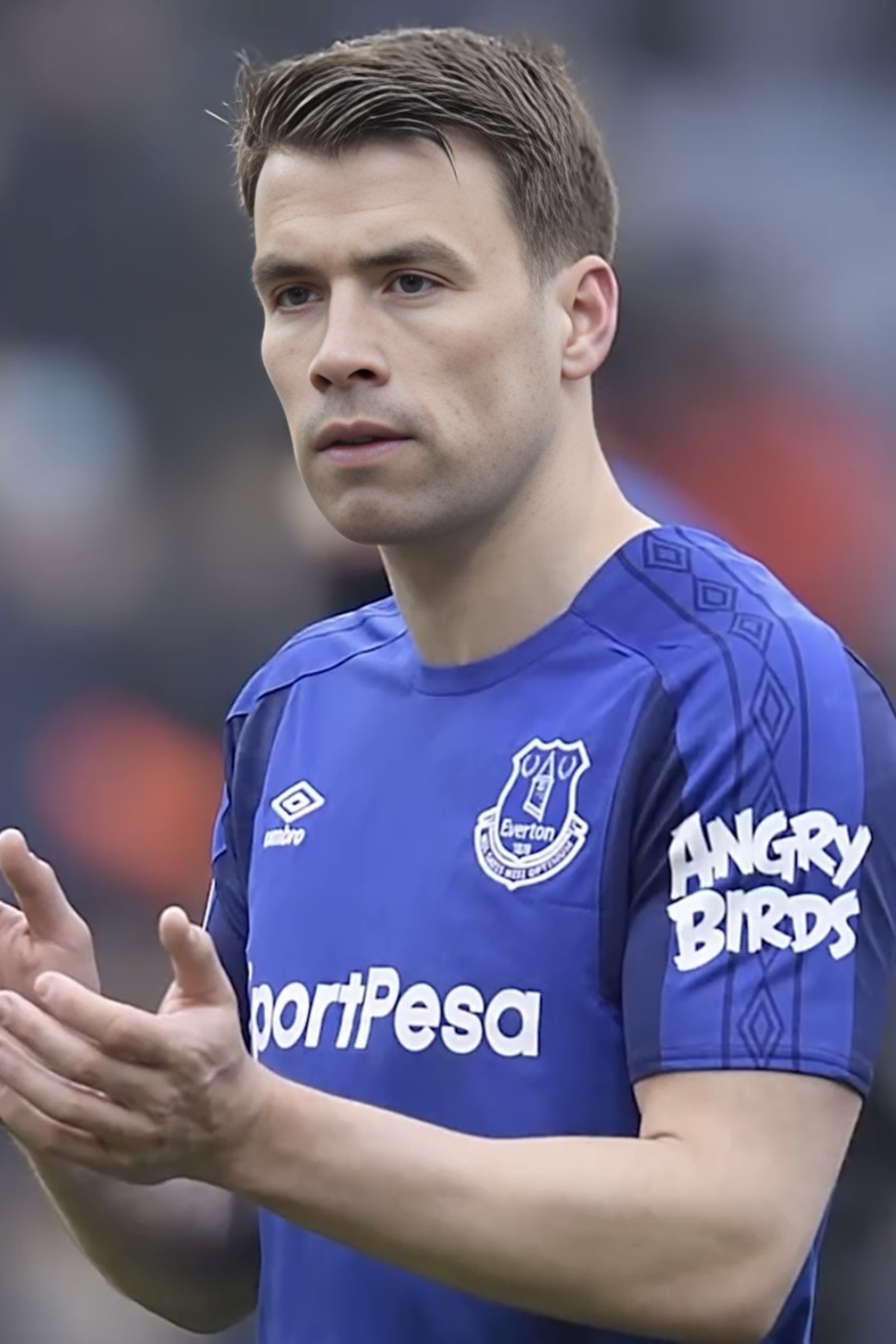
Séamus Coleman was captain of Everton from 2019 to 2026.

Name	Period
(Scotland) Nick Ross	1888–1889
(Scotland) Andrew Hannah	1889–1891
(England) Johnny Holt	1891–1893
(England) Bob Howarth	1893–1894
(Scotland) Dickie Boyle	1894–1896
(Scotland) Billy Stewart	1896–1897
(Scotland) Dickie Boyle	1897–1898
(Scotland) Jack Taylor	1898–1900
(England) Jimmy Settle	1900–1901
(England) Tom Booth	1901–1904
(England) Billy Balmer	1904–1905
(Scotland) Jack Taylor	1905–1908
(England) Jack Sharp	1908–1910
(England) Harry Makepeace	1910–1911
(Scotland) John Maconnachie	1911–1914
(Scotland) Jimmy Galt	1914–1915

Name	Period
(England) Tom Fleetwood	1919–1920
(England) Dickie Downs	1920–1921
(Scotland) Jock McDonald	1921–1922
(Scotland) Hunter Hart	1922–1927
(England) Warney Cresswell	1927–1929
(Scotland) Hunter Hart	1929–1930
(Wales) Ben Williams	1930–1931
(England) Dixie Dean	1931–1937
(Republic of Ireland) Billy Cook	1937–1938
(Scotland) Jock Thomson	1938–1939
(England) Norman Greenhalgh	1946–1948
(Republic of Ireland) Peter Farrell	1948–1957
(England) T.E. Jones	1957–1961
(Wales) Roy Vernon	1961–1965
(England) Brian Labone	1965–1970
(England) Alan Ball	1970–1971

Name	Period
(England) Howard Kendall	1972–1974
(England) Roger Kenyon	1974–1976
(England) Mick Lyons	1976–1982
(England) Billy Wright	1982–1983
(England) Mark Higgins	1983–1984
(Wales) Kevin Ratcliffe	1984–1992
(England) Dave Watson	1992–1997
(Wales) Gary Speed	1997–1998
(England) Dave Watson	1998–2001
(England) Kevin Campbell	2001–2002
(Scotland) Duncan Ferguson	2002–2004
(England) Alan Stubbs	2004–2005
(Scotland) David Weir	2005–2007
(England) Phil Neville	2007–2013
(England) Phil Jagielka	2013–2019
(Republic of Ireland) Séamus Coleman	2019–2026

== Club officials ==
As of 5 August 2026

=== Executive ===
Position	Name
Chairman	(United States) Dan Friedkin
Executive Chairman	(United States) Marc Watts
Chief Executive Officer	(England) Angus Kinnear
Club ambassadors	(England) Graham Stuart
Club ambassadors	(Scotland) Graeme Sharp
Club ambassadors	(England) Ian Snodin

=== Coaching staff ===
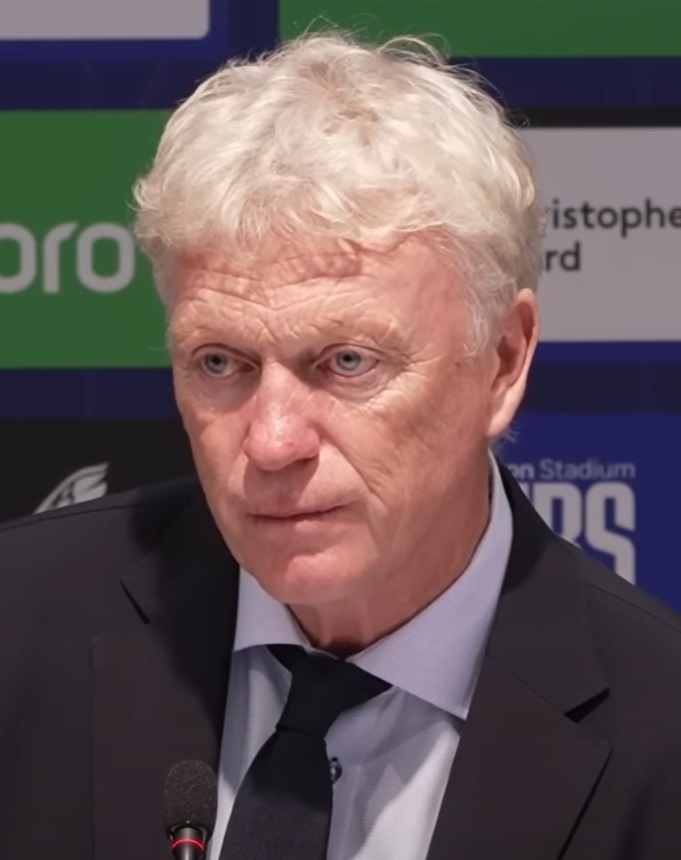
David Moyes managed Everton from 2002 to 2013 and returned for a second tenure in 2025.

Position	Name
Manager	(Scotland) David Moyes
Assistant Managers	(Scotland) Alan Irvine
Assistant Managers	(Scotland) Billy McKinlay
Assistant Managers	(England) Leighton Baines
Goalkeeper Coaches	(England) David Lucas
Goalkeeper Coaches	(England) Aaron Cameron
Set Piece Coach	(England) Dave Reddington
Fitness Coaches	(England) Jack Dowling
Fitness Coaches	(England) Sean Miller
Fitness Coaches	(England) Chris Wilding
Head of Medical	(England) Adam Newall
Chief Analyst	(England) Matthew Hawkes
Video Analysts	(England) Mark Moran
Video Analysts	(England) Oliver Maher
Match Analysts	(England) Charlie Reeves
Match Analysts	(England) Sam Morcom
Head of Scouting	(England) Lee Sargeson
Head of Academy Coaching	(Wales) Carl Darlington
Under-21s Head Coach	(Wales) David Hughes

=== Notable managers ===
The club's current manager is David Moyes who returned for his second spell at the club taking over from Sean Dyche in January 2025. There have also been four caretaker managers, and before 1939 the team was selected by either the club secretary or by committee. The club's longest-serving manager has been Harry Catterick, who was in charge of the team from 1961 to 1973 for 594 first team matches. The Everton manager to win the most domestic and international trophies is Howard Kendall, who won two First Division championships, the 1984 FA Cup, the 1985 UEFA Cup Winners' Cup, and three FA Charity Shields.

== Records and statistics ==
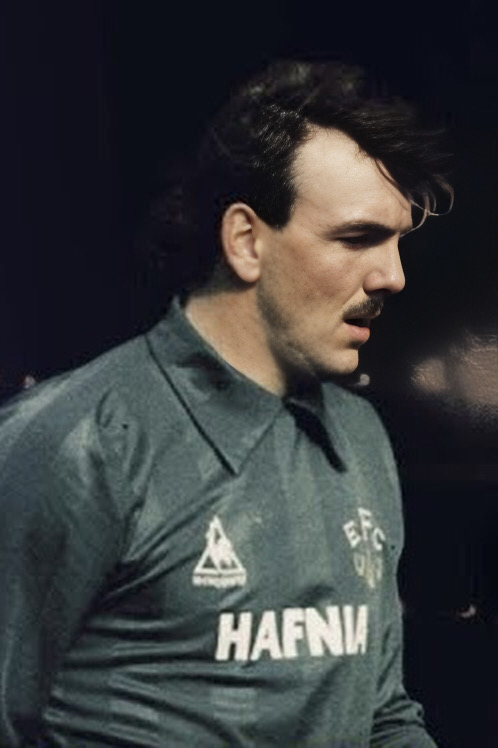
Goalkeeper Neville Southall made a record 751 first-team appearances for Everton between 1981 and 1997.

Neville Southall holds the record for the most Everton appearances with 751 first-team matches between 1981 and 1997. The late centre half and former captain Brian Labone comes in second with 534 matches. The longest serving player is goalkeeper Ted Sagar, who played for 23 years between 1929 and 1953. This tenure covered both sides of the Second World War and included a total of 495 appearances. Southall also previously held the record for the most league clean sheets during a season with 15. However, this record was beaten during the 2008–09 season by American goalkeeper Tim Howard, who ended the season with 17 clean sheets. The club's top goalscorer, with 383 goals in all competitions, is Dixie Dean; the second-highest goalscorer is Graeme Sharp with 159. Dean still holds the English national record of most goals in a season with 60.

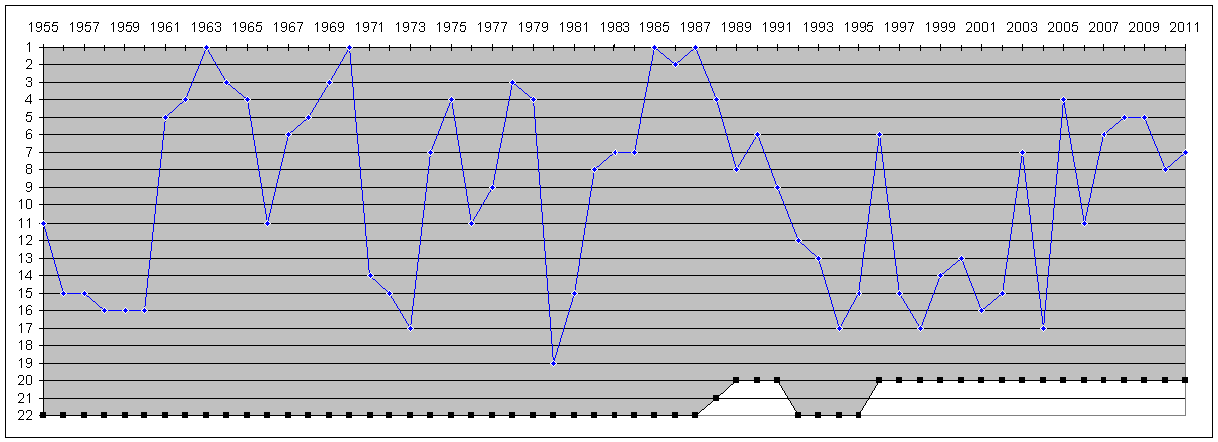
Finishing positions in the top flight between 1955 and 2011

The record attendance for an Everton home match is 78,299 against Liverpool on 18 September 1948. Remarkably, there was only one injury at this game, which occurred when Tom Fleetwood was hit on the head by a coin thrown from the crowd whilst he marched around the perimeter and played the cornet with St Edward's Orphanage Band. Goodison Park, like all major English football grounds since the recommendations of the Taylor Report were implemented, is now an all-seater and only holds just under 40,000, meaning it is unlikely that this attendance record will ever be broken at Goodison. Everton's record transfer paid was to Swansea City for the Icelandic midfielder Gylfi Sigurðsson for a sum of £45m in 2017. The sale of Romelu Lukaku to Manchester United the same year was for an initial sum of £75m, the largest sum Everton has received for a player and then the largest transfer between two English clubs.

Everton hold the record for the most seasons in England's top tier (Division One/Premier League), with 122 seasons out of 126, as of completion of the 2024–25 season (the club played in Division 2 in 1930–31 and from 1951 to 1954). They are one of six teams to have played in every season of the Premier League since its inception in August 1992 – the others being Arsenal, Chelsea, Liverpool, Manchester United, and Tottenham Hotspur. Everton against Aston Villa is the most played fixture in England's top flight. As of the 2024–25 season, the two founding members of the Football League have played a record 214 league games.

== Honours ==
Type	Competition	Titles	Seasons
Domestic	First Division (Note: Upon its formation in 1992, the Premier League became the top tier of English football; the Football League First and Second Divisions then became the second and third tiers, respectively. From 2004, the First Division became the Championship and the Second Division became League One.)	9	1890–91, 1914–15, 1927–28, 1931–32, 1938–39, 1962–63, 1969–70, 1984–85, 1986–87
Domestic	Second Division	1	1930–31
Domestic	FA Cup	5	1905–06, 1932–33, 1965–66, 1983–84, 1994–95
Domestic	FA Charity Shield (Note: In 2002 the Charity Shield was renamed to Community Shield)	9	1928, 1932, 1963, 1970, 1984, 1985, 1986 (shared), 1987, 1995
Continental	UEFA Cup Winners' Cup	1	1984–85

== See also ==
- List of Everton F.C. managers
- List of Everton F.C. players
- List of Everton F.C. international players
- List of Everton F.C. records and statistics
- List of Everton F.C. seasons
- Everton F.C. in European football
- Everton W.F.C.

== Bibliography ==
- Ball, D.; Buckland, G. (2001). Everton: The Ultimate Book of Stats & Facts. The Bluecoat Press. ISBN 1-872568-79-3.
- Corbett, James (2004). Everton: School of Science. Pan. ISBN 0-330-42006-2.
- Tallentire, Becky (2004). The Little Book of Everton. Carlton Books Ltd. ISBN 1-84442-652-1.
