= 1888–89 Everton F.C. season =

English football club season

Everton
1888–89 season
- Manager: William Edward Barclay
- The Football League: 8th
- Top goalscorer: Edgar Chadwick (6)
- Highest home attendance: 15,000 vs Preston (19 January 1889)
- Lowest home attendance: 2,079 vs West Brom (23 February 1889)
Home colours

In 1888–89, Everton F.C. was a founding member of the Football League and competed in the first edition of the competition. The team finished eighth, avoiding re-election by a single place.

== Regular First team ==
Note: Flags indicate national team as defined under FIFA eligibility rules; some limited exceptions apply. Players may hold more than one non-FIFA nationality.

Pos.	Nation	Player
GK	ENG	Robert Smalley, 18 appearances
DF	ENG	George Dobson, 18 appearances
DF	SCO	Nick Ross, 19 appearances
MF	SCO	John Weir, 16 appearances
MF	ENG	Johnny Holt, 17 appearances
MF	WAL	George Farmer, 21 appearances
FW	WAL	Joe Davies, 8 appearances at outside right
FW	ENG	Robert Watson, 18 appearances at inside right
FW	ENG	Frank Sugg, 9 appearances at centre forward
FW	ENG	Edgar Chadwick, inside left
FW	ENG	James Costley, 6 appearances at outside left

Teams at the time played a 2–3–5 formation. Thus, Dobson and Ross were "full-backs" while Weir, Holt, and Farmer were "halfbacks". However, Everton fielded by far the most unsettled side of all the twelve original Football League members, using thirty-five players in their twenty-two game campaign. Indeed, the club have never fielded more players in any season since, despite having played as many as twenty league games more in over fifty subsequent seasons. So inconsistent was their team selection that at no time did the above combination actually take the field. Not surprisingly Everton's best result of the season, a 6–2 victory over Derby County on 20 October 1888 was achieved with ten of the above players on the field. Robert Watson missed that game while his deputy, Alex McKinnon scored the only hat-trick obtained by an Everton player all season. This was the only game in which ten of the first eleven featured.

== Other players used ==
- Alec Dick (9 appearances – right back)
- David Waugh (7 apps – inside right)
- William Brown (6 apps – outside left)
- Alex McKinnon (6 apps – outside right)
- Alf Milward (6 apps – centre forward)
- Jack Angus (5 apps at outside left)
- George Fleming (4 apps – outside right)
- Charles Jolliffe (4 apps – goalkeeper)
- Wiliam Lewis (3 apps – centre forward)
- William Briscoe (3 apps – inside left)
- Albert Chadwick (2 apps – left back)
- Jas Coyne (2 apps – inside right)
- George Davie (2 apps – centre forward)
- Mike Higgins (1 app – centre half)
- Robert Jones (1 app – centre back)
- Bob Kelso (1 app – centre back),
- Jack Keys (1 app – centre forward)
- R Morris (1 app – centre forward)
- Henry Parkinson (1 app – centre half)
- Hugh Pollock (1 app – centre back)
- Roberts (1 app – centre back)
- George Stephenson (1 app – centre back)
- Harry Warmby (1 app – centre back)
- Walter Wilson (1 app – left back)

Note that position listed is that filled most commonly by the player during this season and may not always have been the role played.

== League ==
=== Table ===
Pos	Team	Pld	W	D	L	GF	GA	GAv	Pts	Qualification
6	West Bromwich Albion	22	10	2	10	40	46	0.870	22	
7	Accrington	22	6	8	8	48	48	1.000	20	
8	Everton	22	9	2	11	35	47	0.745	20	
9	Burnley	22	7	3	12	42	62	0.677	17	Re-elected
10	Derby County	22	7	2	13	41	61	0.672	16	Re-elected

Source: World Football
Rules for classification: 1) Points; 2) Goal average; 3) Goals scored

=== Results ===
Date	Opponents	Home/ Away	Result F – A	Scorers	Attendance
8 September 1888	Accrington	H	2–1	George Fleming (2)	12,000
15 September 1888	Notts County	H	2–1	Edgar Chadwick, Nick Ross	6,000
22 September 1888	Aston Villa	A	1–2	Robert Watson	5,000
29 September 1888	Bolton	A	2–6	William Lewis, Robert Watson	5,000
6 October 1888	Aston Villa	H	2–0	George Farmer, Dave Waugh	10,000
13 October 1888	Notts County	A	1–3	Nick Ross	4,000
20 October 1888	Derby	A	4–2	James Costley (2), Edgar Chadwick, Alex McKinnon	3,000
27 October 1888	Derby	H	6–2	Alex McKinnon (3), Nick Ross (2), Robert Watson	3,000
3 November 1888	Bolton	H	2–1	William Brown, Nick Ross	8,000
10 November 1888	Blackburn	A	0–3		6,000
17 November 1888	Burnley	A	2–2	Edgar Chadwick, Robert Watson	3,000
24 November 1888	Burnley	H	3–2	Edgar Chadwick, James Costley, Coyne	6,000
1 December 1888	West Brom	A	1–4	Edgar Chadwick	5,700
15 December 1888	Stoke	A	0–0		1,500
22 December 1888	Preston	A	0–3		8,000
29 December 1888	Accrington	A	1–3	William Brown	2,000
12 January 1889	Stoke	H	2–1	Joe Davies, Alf Milward	7,000
19 January 1889	Preston	H	0–2		15,000
26 January 1889	Wolves	A	0–5		4,500
9 February 1889	Wolves	H	1–2	Edgar Chadwick	6,000
23 February 1889	West Brom	H	0–1		2,079
30 March 1889	Blackburn	H	3–1	Joe Davies, Alf Milward, Dave Waugh	4,000

== Sources ==
- http://www.evertonfc.com/stats/?mode=players&era_id=1&season_id=2&seasons=2
- http://www.allfootballers.com
