= 1892–93 Everton F.C. season =

English football club season

Everton
1892–93 season
- Manager: Dick Molyneux
- The Football League: 3rd
- Top goalscorer: Fred Geary (19)
- Highest home attendance: 27,500 vs Preston (11 February 1893) record
- Lowest home attendance: 8,000 vs Notts County (7 January 1893)
- Average home league attendance: 12.964 (record average)
Home colours	Away colours

== Regular Football League First team ==
Note: Flags indicate national team as defined under FIFA eligibility rules; some limited exceptions apply. Players may hold more than one non-FIFA nationality.

Pos.	Nation	Player
	ENG	Richard Williams 11 appearances in goal
	ENG	Bob Howarth 26 appearances at right & left back
	SCO	James Collins 9 appearances at left back
	SCO	Dickie Boyle 25 appearances at left, centre and right half
	ENG	Johnny Holt 26 appearances at centre half
	SCO	Jimmy Jamieson 14 appearances at left half
	SCO	Alex Latta 28 appearances at outside right, inside right and centre forward
	SCO	Alan Maxwell 23 appearances at inside right, centre forward and inside left
	ENG	Fred Geary 24 appearances at outside right & centre forward
	ENG	Edgar Chadwick 27 appearances at inside left
	ENG	Alf Milward 27 appearances at outside left

Number of League games in which this eleven was fielded = 0

== Other members of the first team squad ==
Note: Flags indicate national team as defined under FIFA eligibility rules; some limited exceptions apply. Players may hold more than one non-FIFA nationality.

Pos.	Nation	Player
	SCO	David Jardine 8 appearances in goal
	GBR	Archibald Pinnell 3 appearances in goal
	GBR	William Thomas 1 appearance in goal
	SCO	Joey Murray 3 appearances in goal and 1 at inside right
	GBR	Alex Rennie 4 appearances in goal
	SCO	Bob Kelso 14 appearances at right back & left half
	ENG	James Dewar 1 appearance at left back
	ENG	Albert Chadwick 3 appearances at left back
	GBR	Robert Thompson 1 appearance at left back
	WAL	Charlie Parry 10 appearances at left back, right half and left half
	SCO	Alec Stewart 12 appearances at right and left half
	ENG	Jack Elliott 4 appearances at centre half and outside left
	WAL	Robert Jones 2 appearances at centre half
	SCO	Hope Robertson 6 appearances at left half
	SCO	Jack Bell 3 appearances at outside right
	SCO	Patrick Gordon 10 appearances at inside right and centre forward
	SCO	Abe Hartley 1 appearance at inside right
	SCO	James McMillan 2 appearances at inside left

Everton were expected to be serious title contenders in the 1892–93 season but a summer of off the field turmoil played a part in a good but not great season. The club were forced to vacate their Anfield Road home and set up at a brand new venue of Goodison Park, leaving behind them their first choice left back, Duncan McLean and forward Alan Wylie. The latter probably realised that the return from injury of Fred Geary would see him left out of the front line but McLean's decision was a surprise to the club and fans and Bob Howarth found himself with six full back partners during the season. For the second year in a row the club struggled to find a first choice keeper as six different custodians filled that role as well, including Joey Murray on three occasions, despite his normal position being as a forward. The indecision in goal was more down to the selectors than poor performance as each defeat the club suffered in the first half of the campaign was met with the keeper being dropped. Eventually the selectors settled for Richard Williams whose regular clean sheets in the latter half of the season saw the club rally to finish the season in third place and reach the cup final.

Everton's midfield trio was also broken up this season as Bob Kelso lost his place to Dickie Boyle who arrived from Dumbarton. The clubs erratic start also saw Hope Robertson replaced eight games in by Jimmy Jamieson. The Scottish left half's stay at Goodison was short and after just four months he left for Sheffield Wednesday.

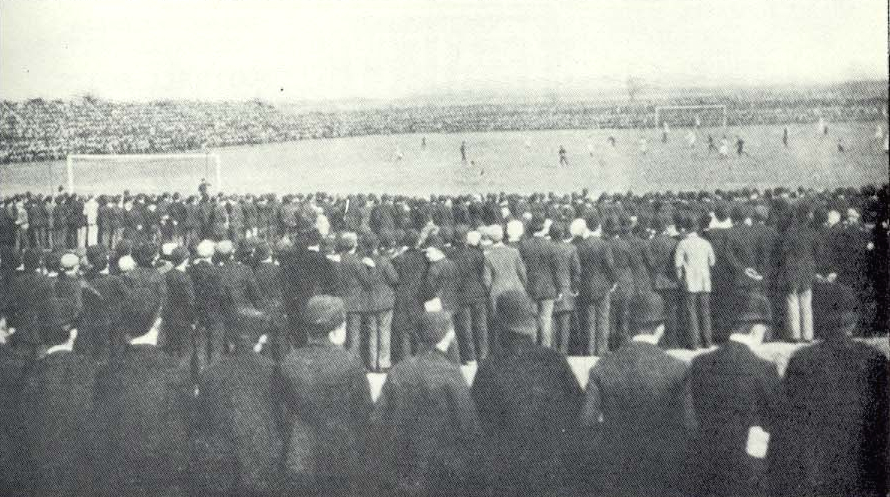
1893 FA Cup Final, Wolves beat Everton 1–0.

With Sunderland marching to the title and Everton having to settle for a distant third place, albeit after an excellent run in which saw them win nine of their last ten games it was the F A cup that captured the excitement as the club won through to the final for the first time. The selectors famously fielded a weakened side for the trip to Wolverhampton Wanderers in a league game a week before the two sides met in the cup final and won 4–2. Only four of that team appeared the following week at the cup final as Boyle and Latta were joined by Kelso, having re-established himself in defence ahead of Collins and Stewart who had taken over after Jamieson had left for Sheffield Wednesday the previous month. The major selection surprise was that Patrick Gordon was selected ahead of Fred Geary in attack. The game became farce when the fans encroached onto the woefully inadequate field at Fallowfield in Manchester and made it impossible for Latta and Milward to use their wing play to proper effect, the latter being physically tripped by a spectator on one occasion. Wolves won the game in the second half when Harry Allen's hopeful punt deceived Dick Williams who lost the ball in the sun. Everton were furious though that Allen had received the ball from a spectator who had kicked the ball of Dickie Boyle's toe as the Everton half was taking the ball away from danger and felt that the game should have been reduced to the level of a friendly with the cup being played for at a later date. The game would leave a bad taste in the mouths of every Evertonian for over a decade until they finally did win the cup in 1906.

== The Football League ==
Date	Opponents	Home/ Away	Result F – A	Scorers	Attendance
3 September 1892	Nottingham Forest	H	2–2	Fred Geary, Alf Milward	14,000
10 September 1892	Aston Villa	A	1–4	Fred Geary	12,000
17 September 1892	Blackburn	A	2–2	Alex Latta, Alan Maxwell	9,000
24 September 1892	Newtown Heath	H	6–0	Fred Geary (2), Edgar Chadwick (2), Alan Maxwell, Alf Milward	10,000
1 October 1892	Aston Villa	H	1–0	Alan Maxwell	10,000
8 October 1892	Sunderland	H	1–4	Alex Latta	18,000
15 October 1892	West Bromwich Albion	A	0–3		8,000
19 October 1892	Newtown Heath	A	4–3	Alex Latta (4)	4,000
24 October 1892	Accrington	H	1–1	Alf Milward	14,000
29 October 1892	Bolton Wanderers	A	1–4	Alex Latta	6,000
5 November 1892	Derby County	A	6–1	Alex Latta (3), Fred Geary (3)	5,000
12 November 1892	Stoke	H	2–2	Fred Geary, Alf Milward	12,000
26 November 1892	Wednesday	H	3–5	Edgar Chadwick (2), Alf Milward	12,000
3 December 1892	Preston North End	A	0–5		5,000
10 December 1892	Wolverhampton	H	3–2	Edgar Chadwick, Patrick Gordon, Fred Geary	10,000
17 December 1892	Notts County	A	2–1	Alex Latta, Fred Geary	10,000
24 December 1892	Burnley	H	0–1		10,000
3 January 1893	Sunderland	A	3–4	Alf Milward (2). Alex Latta	5,000
7 January 1893	Notts County	H	6–0	Alf Milward, Alex Latta, Alan Maxwell, Fred Geary (2), Edgar Chadwick	8,000
12 January 1893	Nottingham Forest	A	1–2	Alex Stewart	5,000
14 January 1893	West Bromwich Albion	H	1–0	Fred Geary	10,000
28 January 1893	Stoke	A	1–0	Alf Milward	5,000
11 February 1893	Preston North End	H	6–0	Alan Maxwell (2), Alex Latta, Patrick Gordon, Edgar Chadwick, Alf Milward	27,500
13 February 1893	Wednesday	A	2–0	Edgar Chadwick, Harry Brandon own goal
25 February 1893	Accrington	A	3–0	Edgar Chadwick (2), Bob Kelso (penalty)	4,000
18 March 1893	Wolverhampton Wanderers	A	4–2	Fred Geary (2), Abe Hartley, Jack Elliott	5,000
1 April 1893	Blackburn Rovers	H	4–0	Robert Jones, Alan Maxwell, Fred Geary, James McMillan	14,000
3 April 1893	Bolton Wanderers	H	3–0	Alex Latta, Fred Geary	20,000
8 April 1893	Burnley	A	0–3		7,000
15 April 1893	Derby County	H	5–0	Alex Latta (2), Fred Geary (2), Alf Milward	12,000

== Football Association Challenge Cup ==
Date	Round	Opponents	Home/ Away	Result F – A	Scorers	Attendance
21 January 1893	First	West Bromwich Albion	H	4–1	Fred Geary (2), Alex Latta, Alan Maxwell	23,867
4 February 1893	Second	Nottingham Forest	H	4–2	Fred Geary, Alf Milward (2), Edgar Chadwick	25,000
18 February 1893	Quarter final	Wednesday	H	3–0	Fred Geary, Bob Kelso (penalty), Edgar Chadwick	30,000
14 March 1893	Semi Final	Preston North End	Bramall Lane, Sheffield	2–2 (after extra time)	Patrick Gordon, Edgar Chadwick	30,000
16 March 1893	Semi Final replay	Preston North End	Bramall Lane, Sheffield	0–0		30,000
20 March 1893	Semi Final second replay	Preston North End	Ewood Park, Blackburn	2–1	Patrick Gordon, Alan Maxwell	20,000
25 March 1893	1893 FA Cup Final	Wolverhampton Wanderers	Fallowfield Stadium, Manchester	0–1		45,067

== Football League First Division ==
		P	W	D	L	F	A	GA	Pts
1	Sunderland	30	22	4	4	100	36	2.778	48
2	Preston North End	30	17	3	10	57	39	1.462	37
3	Everton	30	16	4	10	74	51	1.451	36
4	Aston Villa	30	16	3	11	73	62	1.177	35
5	Bolton Wanderers	30	13	6	11	56	55	1.018	32
6	Burnley	30	13	4	13	51	44	1.159	30
7	Stoke	30	12	5	13	58	48	1.208	29
8	West Bromwich Albion	30	12	5	13	58	69	0.841	29
9	Blackburn Rovers	30	8	13	9	47	56	0.839	29
10	Nottingham Forest	30	10	8	12	48	52	0.923	28
11	Wolverhampton Wanderers	30	12	4	14	47	68	0.691	28
12	The Wednesday	30	12	3	15	55	65	0.846	27
13	Derby County	30	9	9	12	52	64	0.813	27
14	Notts County	30	10	4	16	53	61	0.869	24
15	Accrington	30	6	11	13	57	81	0.704	23
16	Newton Heath	30	6	6	18	50	85	0.588	18

== Records ==
The following positive or neutral records were set by the 1891–92 Everton team

- Most points in a season = 36
- Most home points in a season = 21
- Most away points in a season = 15
- Most wins in a season = 16
- Equalled most home wins in a season = 9 matched 1890–91 team
- Most home draws in a season = 3
- Most goals scored in a season = 74
- Most home goals scored in a season = 44
- Most away goals scored in a season = 30
- Biggest away win in league history 6–1 @ Derby County 5 November 1892
- Equalled most goals in a single game = 4 Alex Latta, vs Newton Heath, 19 October 1892
- Most hat tricks by team in a season = 3
- Equalled Most season hat tricks = 2 Alex Latta matched his own 1892 record
- Most Everton Hat tricks career = 5 Alex Latta (added two this season)
- Longest winning sequence in club history = 8 from 14 January to 3 April 1893
- Longest home winning sequence in club history = 6 from 7 January to season's end
- Longest unbeaten run in club history = 8 from 14 January to 3 April
- Equalled longest unbeaten home run in club history = 6 from 7 January to season's end matching 1889–90 team and 1890–91 team
- Equalled longest home drawn sequence = 2 matching 1889–90 team
- Equalled fewest away draw in a season = 1 matching 1889–90 and 1890–91 teams

The following negative records were also set by the team

- Equalled most home defeats in a season = 3 matching with 1888–89 team and 1891–92 team
- Most goals conceded in a season = 51
- Equalled most home goals conceded in a season = 17 matching 1888–89 team
- Most away goals conceded in a season = 34
- First season in history without an ever present player
- Longest winless home sequence in a season = 4
