= 1889–90 Everton F.C. season =

English football club season

Everton
1889–90 season
- Manager: Dick Molyneux
- The Football League: Runners-up
- Top goalscorer: Fred Geary (21)
- Highest home attendance: 16,000 vs Preston (16 November 1889)
- Lowest home attendance: 4,000 vs Wolverhampton (30 September 1889)
Home colours

The 1889–90 season was Everton Football Club's second year in The Football League. The team's top goalscorer was Fred Geary.

== Regular Football League First team ==
Note: Flags indicate national team as defined under FIFA eligibility rules; some limited exceptions apply. Players may hold more than one non-FIFA nationality.

Pos.	Nation	Player
GK	ENG	Robert Smalley 17 appearances in goal
DF	SCO	Andrew Hannah ever present right full-back
DF	SCO	Dan Doyle ever present left full-back
MF	WAL	Charlie Parry ever present halfback
MF	ENG	Johnny Holt 21 appearances at halfback
MF	WAL	George Farmer 10 appearances at halfback
FW	SCO	Alex Latta 21 appearances at outside right
FW	SCO	Alec Brady 13 appearances at inside right
FW	ENG	Fred Geary 18 appearances at centre forward
FW	ENG	Edgar Chadwick ever present inside left
FW	ENG	Alf Milward ever present outside left

Such was the transition at Everton over the summer that just four of the previous season's first choice eleven, Smalley, Farmer, Holt and Chadwick remained in place, the latter being the only player to play in every Everton League game since the formation of the competition. Twenty-five-year-old right back, Andrew Hannah was brought from Renton to replace the retired George Dobson. A disappointed Nick Ross returned to Preston having missed their double winning season and was replaced by the Bolton veteran left back, Dan Doyle. Charlie Parry arrived from Chester St Oswalds, pushing James Weir out of the side and striker Frank Sugg was also pushed out as Fred Geary was brought in from Notts County. Joe Davies returned to his hometown club Chirk to be replaced by Alex Latta from Dumbarton meaning that no less than five new signings made their debut on the opening day of the season with two of them, Geary and Parry both becoming instant heroes by scoring the goals in a 3–2 victory over Blackburn.

The loss of inside right Robert Watson to Gorton Villa during the summer left a gap that wasn't properly filled until November when Alec Brady arrived from Sunderland and also scored on his debut in the 8–0 mauling of Stoke.

His arrival completed what became the first choice eleven for the season but they only actually played as a team on one occasion when, in the formation listed above, they slumped to their worst result of the entire season, losing 1–5 at home to Preston on 16 November, despite leading at half time. Their second half display that day would ultimately cost Everton the title as the two points won by Preston proved to be the margin between the two sides at the end of the season. Centre Half, George Farmer was heavily criticised for the defeat and was the only change for the next game, which Everton won 4–2 at Blackburn Rovers. He never regained his place in the side and was released at the end of the season. Farmer's and Brady's Everton careers overlapped only three games, hence the solitary appearance of the first eleven, although the other nine, along with Farmer during the first half of the season and Brady during the latter half were almost a constant, with the result that five played all twenty-two games while Holt and Latta each missed just one.

== Other players used in the Football League ==
Bob Cain (4 appearances at centre back), Walter Cox (4 apps in goal), Harry Hammond (1 app at left back), Jimmy Jamieson (1 app at centre forward), Charles Jolliffe (1 app in goal), Robert Jones (1 app at inside right), Daniel Kirkwood (11 apps at inside right), Willie Orr (1 app at centre forward), Frank Sugg (1 app at centre back), James Weir (3 apps at left back)

Sugg and Weir had both been first team regulars the previous season but were edged out by new faces, the former going on to achieve greater fame as a cricketer of the highest calibre. Harry Hammond made only this one appearance for Everton before going on to narrowly miss out on winning the title with Sheffield United

- NB position listed is that filled most commonly by the player during this season and may not always have been the role played.

== League ==
Date	Opponents	Home/ Away	Result F – A	Scorers	Attendance
7 September 1889	Blackburn	H	3–2	Fred Geary (2), Charlie Parry	12,000
14 September 1889	Burnley	H	2–1	Charlie Parry, Fred Geary	11,000
16 September 1889	Wolverhampton	A	1–2	Charlie Parry	2,000
21 September 1889	Bolton	A	4–3	Fred Geary (2), Edgar Chadwick, Alf Milward	4,500
28 September 1889	Bolton	H	3–0	Alex Latta, Fred Geary (2)	10,000
30 September 1889	Wolverhampton	H	1–1	Edgar Chadwick	4,000
5 October 1889	Derby	A	2–2	Edgar Chadwick, W Orr	2,500
19 October 1889	Notts County	A	3–4	Fred Geary, Alf Milward (2)	6,000
26 October 1889	Accrington	H	2–2	Fred Geary Edgar Chadwick	8,000
2 November 1889	Stoke	H	8–0	Alex Latta (2), Alexander Brady (2), FRED GEARY (3) Alf Milward	7,500
9 November 1889	Stoke	A	2–1	Alex Latta, Fred Geary	1,500
16 November 1889	Preston North End	H	1–5	Fred Geary	18,000
23 November 1889	Aston Villa	A	2–1	Fred Geary	6,000
7 December 1889	Notts County	H	5–3	Charlie Parry, ALEX LATTA (3), Edgar Chadwick	5,000
21 December 1889	Preston North End	A	2–1	Fred Geary, Alf Milward	7,000
28 December 1889	Blackburn Rovers	A	4–2	Alex Latta, Alexander Brady, Alf Miward (2)	12,000
4 January 1890	Aston Villa	H	7–0	Alex Latta, Fred Geary (2). Alexander Brady (2), Edgar Chadwick (2)	10,000
8 February 1890	Burnley	A	1–0	Edgard Chadwick	6,000
22 February 1890	Accrington	A	3–5	Alexander Brady (2), Fred Geary	6,000
8 March 1890	West Bromwich Albion	H	5–1	Edgar Chadwick, Johnny Holt, Alexander Brady, Alf Milward (2)	8,400
15 March 1890	Derby County	H	3–0	Alf Milward, Archibald Ferguson own goal, Albert Williamson own goal	12,000
23 March 1890	West Bromwich Albion	A	1–4	Fred Geary	4,000

== Football Association Challenge Cup ==
Date	Round	Opponents	Home/ Away	Result F – A	Scorers	Attendance
18 January 1890	First	Derby County	H	11–2	Dan Doyle, David Kirkwood, ALEXANDER BRADY (3), FRED GEARY (3), ALF MILWARD (3)	10,000
3 February 1890	Second	Stoke	A	2–4	Fred Geary, Alf Milward	7,000

== Achievements ==
The 1889/90 team set the following club records in the League

- Best ever finish = Runners up
- Most points gained = 31
- Most home points = 18
- Most away points = 13
- Most wins = 14
- Same number of home wins as last season = 8
- Most away wins = 6
- Most draws = 3
- First ever home draws = 2
- Fewest defeats = 5
- Fewest home defeats = 1
- Fewest away defeats = 4
- Most goals scored = 65
- Most home goals = 40
- Most away goals scored = 25
- Fewest goals conceded = 40
- Fewest home goals conceded = 15
- Fewest away goals conceded = 25
- Record League victory = 8–0 vs Stoke on 2 November 1889
- Equalled Record away victory = 4–2 at Blackburn Rovers on 28 December 1889
- Most hat-tricks as a team in a season = 2
- Equalled most hat-tricks in a season = Fred Geary and Alex Latta, 1 each
- Top League scorer in a season = Fred Geary (21 goals)
- Fewest players used in a League campaign = 21
- Most ever presents in a League campaign (22 games) = 5 – Hannah, Doyle, Parry, Chadwick, Milward
- Most consecutive League victories = 6
- Most consecutive home wins = 5
- Most consecutive away wins = 5
- Longest unbeaten run = 6
- Longest unbeaten home run = 6
- Longest unbeaten away run = 5
- Longest sequence of drawn games = 2
- Longest sequence of home draws = 2
- completed two seasons without drawing two consecutive away games
- Fewest away draws = 1
- Record home defeat = 1–5 vs Preston North End on 5 November 1889
- Completed two seasons without losing consecutive home games
- Longest winless home run = 2
- Record victory in all competitions = 11–2 vs Derby County (F A Cup) on 18 January 1890 (still stands)
- Most consecutive victories in all competitions = 6

== Sources ==
- https://web.archive.org/web/20181002023305/http://www.evertonfc.com/stats/?mode=season&era_id=1&season_id=3&seasons=3
- http://www.allfootballers.com
