= Gwladys Street's Hall of Fame =

Football hall of fame of Everton Football Club

- Established: 1996
- Number of inductees: 131
- Website: Evertonhalloffame.com

Gwladys Street's Hall of Fame celebrates the men who have contributed to the history of English football club Everton. Everton's former men's ground and current women's ground, Goodison Park, is on Gwladys Street in Walton, Liverpool.

== Formation ==
The Hall of Fame was conceived by David France and inaugurated in 1996. Initial inclusion was decided by a panel of players, journalists, shareholders and season-ticket holders who assessed the accomplishments of the candidates during their careers at Everton. It began with 75 players and five club officials. Additional members have been elected by Everton supporters via annual postal ballots and internet polls.

The Hall of Fame has been celebrated annually at the Britannia Adelphi Hotel in Liverpool. After an 8-year hiatus, the Twelfth Hall of Fame Dinner was held at the Liverpool Hilton in March 2017.

== Membership ==
As of 2009, there are 126 members of the Hall of Fame.

- (England) Walter Abbott (1899/1900 – 1907/08)
- (England) John Bailey (1979/80-1985/86)
- (England) Alan Ball (1966/67 – 1971/72)
- (England) Billy Balmer (1897/88 – 1907/08)
- (England) Dr James Baxter (Director & Chairman)
- (Scotland) Jack Bell (1892/93 – 1897/98 & 1901/02 – 1902/03)
- (England) Stan Bentham (1933/34 – 1947/48)
- (England) Arthur Berry (1909/10 – 1910/11)
- (Northern Ireland) Billy Bingham (1960/61 – 1962/63)
- (England) Tom Booth (1900/01 – 1907/08)
- (England) Wally Boyes (1937/38 – 1948/49)
- (Scotland) Richard Boyle (1892/93 – 1900/01)
- (England) Paul Bracewell (1984/85 – 1988/89) (Note: Inducted in 1999)
- (England) Frank Brettell (1880/81 – 1882/83)
- (England) Cliff Britton (1930/31 – 1938/39)
- (England) Kevin Campbell (1998/99 - 2004/05)
- (England) Sir Philip Carter (Director & Chairman) (Note: Inducted in 2000)
- (England) Harry Catterick (Manager)
- (England) Edgar Chadwick (1888/89 – 1898/99)
- (England) Rev. Ben Chambers (Founder) (Note: Inducted in 2009)
- (England) Sam Chedgzoy (1910/11 – 1925/26)
- (England) Joe Clennell (1913/14 – 1921/22)
- (Scotland) Bobby Collins (1958/59 – 1961/62)
- (Ireland) Billy Cook (1932/33 – 1938/39)
- (England) Harry Cooke (Trainer)
- (Ireland) Jackie Coulter (1933/34 – 1937/38)
- (England) Warney Cresswell (1926/27 – 1935/36)
- (England) Ted Critchley (1926/27 – 1933/34)
- (England) Will Cuff (Director & Chairman)
- (England) Dixie Dean (1924/25 – 1937/38)
- (England) George Dobson (1884/85 – 1888/89)
- (England) John Douglas (1879/80 – 1884/85)
- (Scotland) Jimmy Dunn (1928/29 – 1934/35)
- (Republic of Ireland) Tommy Eglington (1946/47 – 1956/57)
- (England) Jack Elliott (Trainer)
- (England) Tom Evans (1880/81 – 1884/85)
- (Wales) George Farmer (1886/87 – 1889/90)
- (Republic of Ireland) Peter Farrell (1946/47 – 1956/57)
- (Scotland) Duncan Ferguson (1994/95 – 1998/99 & 2000/01 – 2005/06)
- (England) Wally Fielding (1945/46 – 1958/59)
- (England) Tom Fleetwood (1910/11 – 1922/23)
- (England) George Fleming (1885/66 – 1888/89)
- (England) Bert Freeman (1907/08 – 1910/11)
- (Scotland) Jimmy Gabriel (1959/60 – 1966/67)
- (England) Fred Geary (1889/90 – 1894/95)
- (England) Charlie Gee (1930/31 – 1938/39)
- (England) Albert Geldard (1932/33 – 1937/38)
- (Scotland) Torry Gillick (1935/36 – 1945/46)
- (Scotland) Andy Gray (1983/84 – 1984/85)
- (Scotland) Andrew Hannah (1888/89 – 1890/91)
- (England) Harold Hardman (1903/04 – 1907/08)
- (England) Brian Harris (1955/56 – 1966/67)
- (Ireland) Val Harris (1907/08 – 1913/14)
- (Scotland) Hunter Hart (1921/22 – 1929/30)
- (England) Colin Harvey (1963/64 – 1974/75)
- (England) Adrian Heath (1981/82 – 1988/89)
- (England) Dave Hickson (1947/48 – 1955/56 & 1957/58 – 1959/60)
- (England) Mike Higgins (1880/81 – 1888/89)
- (England) Johnny Holt (1888/89 – 1897/98)
- (Wales) Barry Horne (1992/93 – 1995/96) (Note: Inducted in 2001)
- (England) John Hurst (1965/66 – 1975/66)
- (England) Jimmy Husband (1964/65 – 1973/74)
- (Ireland) Bobby Irvine (1921/22 – 1927/28)
- (England) Frank Jefferis (1910/11 – 1919/20)
- (England) Tommy Johnson (1929/30 – 1933/34)
- (England) Tommy E. Jones (1950/51 – 1961/62)
- (Wales) T. G. Jones (1936/37 – 1949/50)
- (England) Tony Kay (1962/63 – 1963/64)
- (England) Howard Kendall (1966/67 – 1981/82 & Manager) (Note: Howard Kendall is the only inductee who qualified for induction as both a player and as manager.)
- (England) Bill Kenwright (Director & Chairman)
- (England) Roger Kenyon (1967/68 – 1978/79)
- (England) Andy King (1975/76 – 1979/80 & 1982/83 – 1983/84)
- (England) Brian Labone (1957/58 – 1974/75)
- (England) Bob Latchford (1973/74 – 1980/81)
- (Scotland) Alex Latta (1889/90 – 1895/96)
- (England) Tommy Lawton (1936/37 – 1945/46)
- (England) Mick Lyons (1970/71 – 1981/82)
- (England) George Mahon (Director & Chairman)
- (England) Harry Makepeace (1902/03 – 1914/15)
- (England) Tom Marriot (1880/81 – 1885/86)
- (England) Nigel Martyn (2003/04 - 2005/06)
- (Scotland) Jack McGill (1880/81 – 1886/87)
- (England) Duncan McKenzie (1976/77 – 1977/78)
- (England) Joe Mercer (1932/33 – 1946/47)
- (England) Alf Milward (1888/89 – 1896/97)
- (England) Sir John Moores (Director & Chairman)
- (England) Bob Morris (1880/81 – 1885/86)
- (England) Johnny Morrissey (1962/63 – 1971/72)
- (England) Derek Mountfield (1982/83 – 1987/88)
- (Scotland) Alex Parker (1958/59 – 1964/65)
- (Scotland) Bobby Parker (1913/14 – 1920/21)
- (England) John Willie Parker (1950/51 – 1955/56)
- (England) Fred Pickering (1963/64 – 1966/67) (Note: Inducted in 2002)
- (Wales) Kevin Ratcliffe (1979/80 – 1991/92)
- (England) Peter Reid (1982/83 – 1988/89)
- (England) Jas Richards (1880/81 – 1884/85)
- (England) Kevin Richardson (1981/82 – 1986/87)
- (England) Joe Royle (1965/66 – 1974/75)
- (England) Ted Sagar (1929/30 – 1952/53)
- (Scotland) Alex Scott (1962/63 – 1966/67)
- (Ireland) Billy Scott (1904/05 – 1911/12)
- (England) Jimmy Settle (1898/99 – 1907/08)
- (Scotland) Graeme Sharp (1979/80 – 1990/91)
- (England) Jack Sharp (1899/1900 – 1909/10)
- (Republic of Ireland) Kevin Sheedy (1982/83 – 1991/92)
- (England) Ian Snodin (1986/87 - 1994/95)
- (Wales) Neville Southall (1981/82 – 1997/98)
- (England) Jack Southworth (1893/94 – 1894/95)
- (Scotland) Jimmy Stein (1928/29 – 1934/35)
- (England) Trevor Steven (1983/84 – 1988/89)
- (England) Gary Stevens (1981/82 – 1987/88)
- (Republic of Ireland) Alex Stevenson (1933/34 – 1948/49)
- (England) Graham Stuart (1993/94 – 1997/98)
- (Scotland) Jack Taylor (1896/97 – 1909/10)
- (England) Derek Temple (1956/57 – 1967/68)
- (Scotland) Jock Thomson (1929/30 – 1938/39)
- (Scotland) Alec Troup (1922/23 – 1929/30)
- (England) David Unsworth (1991/92 – 1997/98 & 1998/99 – 2003/04)
- (Wales) Pat Van Den Hauwe (1984/85 - 1988/89)
- (Wales) Roy Vernon (1959/60 – 1964/65)
- (England) Alfred Wade (1878/79 – 1879/80)
- (England) Dave Watson (1986/87 – 1998/99)
- (England) Gordon Watson (1936/37 – 1948/49)
- (England) Gordon West (1961/62 – 1972/73)
- (England) Tommy White (1927/28 – 1936/37)
- (England) Alan Whittle (1967/68 – 1972/73)
- (England) Ray Wilson (1964/65 – 1968/69)
- (England) Samuel Wolstenholme (1897/98 – 1903/04)
- (England) Tommy Wright (1964/65 – 1972/73)
- (Scotland) Alex Young (1960/61 – 1967/68)
- (Scotland) Alex Young (1901/02 – 1910/11)

Images and biographies of these men are included in the three books associated with the Hall of Fame and a video produced for the 2009 celebrations. The Hall of Fame has been celebrated annually at the Adelphi Hotel in Liverpool. These events have provided opportunities for fans to interact with their heroes.

== Other Hall of Fame awards won by Everton players ==
=== English Football Hall of Fame members ===
A number of Everton players have been inducted into the English Football Hall of Fame:

- (England) Dixie Dean (2002 inductee)
- (England) Paul Gascoigne (2002 inductee)
- (England) Alan Ball (2003 inductee)
- (Northern Ireland) Pat Jennings (2003 inductee)
- (England) Tommy Lawton (2003 inductee)
- (England) Gary Lineker (2003 inductee)
- (England) Howard Kendall (2005 inductee)
- (England) Peter Beardsley (2007 inductee) (Note: Beardsley became the first person to be inducted twice when his work at grass roots football was rewarded in 2008 as a "Football Foundation Community Champion".)
- (Wales) Mark Hughes (2007 inductee)
- (Wales) Neville Southall (2008 inductee) (Note: Southall was inducted along with Liverpool F.C.'s Steven Gerrard at a special European night to celebrate the city's successful European Capital of Culture bid.)
- (England) Ray Wilson (2008 inductee)
- (England) Joe Mercer (2009 inductee)
- (England) Harry Catterick (2010 inductee)
- (England) Peter Reid (2014 inductee)
- (Wales) Gary Speed (2017 inductee)

=== Football League 100 Legends ===
The Football League 100 Legends is a list of "100 legendary football players" produced by the Football League in 1998 to celebrate the 100th season of League football.

- (England) Alan Ball
- (England) Dixie Dean
- (England) Paul Gascoigne
- (England) Tommy Lawton
- (England) Gary Lineker
- (England) Joe Mercer
- (Wales) Neville Southall
- (Scotland) Alex Young

== Sources ==
- Gwladys Street's Hall of Fame ISBN 978-1-874799-09-2
- Gwladys Street's Hall of Fame 2nd edition ISBN 1-874799-10-5
- Gwladys Street's Hall of Fame 3rd edition ISBN 1-874799-12-1
