= Charlie Parry =

Welsh footballer

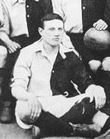
- Parry as part of the Wales team in March 1895

Personal information
- Full name: Charles Frederick Parry
- Date of birth: 25 December 1869
- Place of birth: Oswestry, Shropshire, England
- Date of death: 4 February 1922 (aged 52)
- Place of death: Oswestry, Shropshire, England
- Height: 5 ft 8 in (1.73 m)
- Positions: Half-back; full-back

Senior career*
Years	Team	Apps	(Gls)
1889	Chester St Oswalds		
1889–1895	Everton	86	(5)
1891–1892	→ Ardwick	11	(1)
1895	Ardwick	0	(0)
1895–1899	Newtown		
1899–1900	Aberystwyth Town	31	(4)
1900–1906	Oswestry United		

International career
1891–1898	Wales	13	(0)
- * Club domestic league appearances and goals

Charles Frederick Parry (25 December 1869 – 4 February 1922) was a Welsh footballer who played as a defender for Everton in the 1890s, helping them to win the Football League championship in 1891. He also made thirteen appearances for the Wales national football team including four as captain. Later in his career, he returned to Wales where he won the Welsh Cup with Aberystwyth Town in 1900. He subsequently fell on hard times and was the beneficiary of three testimonial matches.

== Club career ==
=== Early days ===
Parry was born in Oswestry contrary to some reports that list Parry's birthplace as Llansilin. He was spotted playing junior football by William Nunnerley (who was later to become secretary of the Football Association of Wales and an international referee) who signed him for the Chester St Oswalds club.

=== Everton ===
Parry soon came to the attention of Everton who were keen to sign him, but initially Parry was reluctant to move to the English club saying that he was worried that he was "not class enough". Despite this, Parry was persuaded and signed for Everton in the spring of 1889. His first appearance for Everton came in a friendly against Witton on 8 April, when he scored the final goal in a 4–1 victory. According to the match report in The Liverpool Mercury the spectators "seemed to be proud of the capabilities of the last acquisition to the team".

Parry made his Everton league debut in the opening match of the Football League's second season, scoring in a 3–2 victory against Blackburn Rovers. Parry was sent off in the 81st minute for "persistently fouling Forrest". He followed this with goals in the next two matches, against Burnley and Wolverhampton Wanderers. Parry was ever-present as Everton finished the season as runners-up in the league.

Parry was an extremely versatile player who was equally comfortable at full-back or half-back; he possessed good positional sense, a strong tackle and good speed and was an extremely accurate kicker. He was an expert at free-kicks, and over 60 yards he was able to place the ball "on the required spot". He did, however have a reputation for "bashing goalkeepers"; nonetheless he became a regular in the Everton side for six years and was an "exceedingly popular player".

For the 1890–91 season, Parry was paid a weekly wage of £2 and made 13 appearances, spending the early part of the season in the reserves, with new signing William Campbell taking his place in the first team. Following an injury to Alex Latta sustained in a friendly against Third Lanark, Daniel Kirkwood was moved to outside right with Parry being recalled at centre half for the match against Derby County on 4 October. "The combination worked well – so well" that the match ended in a 7–0 victory to Everton, who moved to the top of the table. Parry retained his place for the following five matches, but after a run of three defeats, he lost his place for the match against Sunderland on 15 November. Parry was quickly recalled in time for the crucial 1-0 victory at Molineux that saw Everton replace Wolverhampton Wanderers as League leaders on December 5th. Everton finished the season as champions of the Football League for the first time.

Parry got married in March 1891; the club agreed to pay him "an advance of £15 out of next season's wages . . . in consideration of (his) marriage". For the 1891–92 season his wages were increased to £2 per week during the summer and £2.10.0 during the winter.

Parry played at left-half in the first match of the 1891–92 season, a 4–0 defeat at West Bromwich Albion but then lost his place to Alex Lochhead. (Lochhead was in turn replaced after four matches, by Hope Robertson.) Parry requested to leave the club in October 1891; the board agreed to release him and gave him "full permission to join any other Club on repayment of £34 received during summer months together with the amount due to the club for loans advanced."

Parry appears to have temporarily joined Ardwick AFC playing eleven times (scoring once) between November 1891 and January 1892.

During the summer of 1892, off-field disputes led to Everton leaving the Anfield stadium and moving across Stanley Park to a new stadium at Goodison Park.

Parry was re-engaged by Everton in December 1892, on wages of £2 per week and returned to the first team in January 1893, when he took over from Jimmy Jamieson at left back for the match at Sunderland. Parry played in various positions in ten matches over the next three months until losing his place at left half to Alec Stewart for the final match of the season, following a 3–0 defeat at Burnley. During this period, Everton reached the final of the FA Cup, but Parry was not selected for any of the cup matches.

In September 1893, Parry was suspended for two weeks with no pay for drunkenness. For the 1893–94 season, manager Dick Molyneux used a reasonably settled first team, with eleven players appearing in 20 or more of the 30 league matches. As a result, it was not until 23 December that Parry played his first game of the season, replacing England international Bob Howarth at right back after Howarth suffered "lameness". The match against Sheffield Wednesday ended in an 8–1 victory, with four goals from Jack Southworth, and was followed a week later by a 7–1 victory over West Bromwich Albion in which Southworth scored a further six goals. For the latter match, Parry lined up alongside his fellow Welsh international, Smart Arridge at left back. Parry retained his place in the side for a further seven matches, switching to left back on Howarth's return, but was replaced by Dickie Boyle on 24 March, after a run of four defeats. On 19 March, Parry had again been in trouble with the board "for not attending training etc."; as a result he was suspended for a fortnight and had his bonuses revoked. Parry was recalled to the team for the last two matches of the season.

Following the departure of Bob Howarth at the start of the 1894–95 season, Parry "made the left back his own" with former Scotland international James Adams alongside him on the right. Parry only missed three matches as Everton finished as runners-up in the Football League, five points behind Sunderland.

Parry only made two appearances for Everton in the 1895–96 season, with his final appearance coming in a 3–4 defeat at Aston Villa on 30 September 1895. In this match, Jack Bell scored a hat-trick for Everton but Parry conceded a penalty by "deliberately handling" the ball in the area. The penalty was taken by Ireland and England international Jack Reynolds, but his kick hit the post and went out of play.

In his six years at Everton, Parry made 94 appearances in Football League and FA Cup matches, scoring five goals.

=== Later career ===
Following a short-lived move to Ardwick, for whom he made no first-team appearances, Parry returned to Wales in December 1895 when he took a public house, called the Oak Vaults, in Newtown and joined the local club, then playing in the Shropshire League. In 1897, he helped Newtown reach the final of the Welsh Cup, where they were defeated 2–0 by Wrexham.

In November 1898, Everton played a match at Newtown for the benefit of Parry; the match ended in a 5–1 victory for the visitors with Wilfred Oldham scoring a hat-trick.

In 1899, Parry joined Aberystwyth Town; during his season there, he again reached the Welsh Cup Final, defeating Druids 3–0 to take the trophy.

Parry returned to his home town, Oswestry, in 1900 where Oswestry United were in need of a goalkeeper. Parry became their "custodian" and "performed creditably" over the next six years before eventually retiring in 1906.

In April 1904, Parry was again the beneficiary of a testimonial match when Liverpool visited Park Hall to play Oswestry Town. The visitors won the match 4–0, with two goals from John Carlin.

== International career ==
Parry made his international debut for Wales, playing at left half in the 1891 British Home Championship match against England played at Newcastle Road, Sunderland on 7 March 1891, thus becoming the first Everton player to represent Wales. England won the match 4–1, with two of England's goals coming from Parry's Everton team-mates, Edgar Chadwick and Alf Milward. He kept his place in the Wales team for the next match against Scotland, two weeks later, at the Racecourse Ground, Wrexham. Parry was hurt in the first half and was injured again shortly after half time and was unable to play on, leaving Wales to complete the match with ten men. Scotland came from behind to win the match 4–3, with a late goal from Bob Boyd of Mossend Swifts. In their annual player assessment, the Football Association of Wales described Parry in 1891 as "a good half back but out of condition and got injured; played a splendid game v. England".

As a result of his being out of favour with Everton, Parry was not selected for any of Wales's matches in the 1892 British Home Championship but was recalled to the side as a fullback for one match the following year, a 6–0 defeat against England in March 1893. His next international appearance came a year later, when he scored an own goal in a 5–1 defeat by England on 12 March 1894. Three of England's goals came from John Veitch in his only international appearance.

Parry's best match for Wales came in the 1–1 draw against England in March 1895. For the next three matches, Parry was appointed captain in the absence of James Trainer, leading his team to a 6–1 victory over Ireland on 29 February 1896, with two goals each from Billy Lewis and Billy Meredith, although this was followed by a 9–1 defeat by England, for whom Steve Bloomer scored five goals. In the latter match, he lined up alongside his former Everton colleague, Smart Arridge.

Despite dropping out of the Football League and playing non-league football, Parry retained his international place until 1898. In his thirteen international appearances, Wales won only one match, with two draws and ten defeats.

=== International appearances ===
Parry made 13 appearances for Wales in official international matches, as follows:

Date	Venue	Opponent	Result	Goals	Position	Competition
7 March 1891	Newcastle Road, Sunderland	England	1–4	0	LH	1891 British Home Championship
21 March 1891	Racecourse Ground, Wrexham	Scotland	3–4	0	LH	1891 British Home Championship
13 March 1893	Victoria Ground, Stoke-on-Trent	England	0–6	0	LB	1893 British Home Championship
12 March 1894	Racecourse Ground, Wrexham	England	1–5	Own goal	RB	1894 British Home Championship
18 March 1895	Queen's Club, London	England	1–1	0	RB	1895 British Home Championship
23 March 1895	Racecourse Ground, Wrexham	Scotland	2–2	0	LB (Capt.)	1895 British Home Championship
29 February 1896	Racecourse Ground, Wrexham	Ireland	6–1	0	RB (Capt.)	1896 British Home Championship
16 March 1896	Arms Park, Cardiff	England	1–9	0	RB (Capt.)	1896 British Home Championship
21 March 1896	Carolina Port, Dundee	Scotland	0–4	0	RB	1896 British Home Championship
6 March 1897	Solitude Ground, Belfast	Ireland	3–4	0	LB	1897 British Home Championship
19 February 1898	The Oval, Llandudno	Ireland	0–1	0	RB (Capt.)	1898 British Home Championship
19 March 1898	Fir Park, Motherwell	Scotland	2–5	0	RB	1898 British Home Championship
28 March 1898	Racecourse Ground, Wrexham	England	0–3	0	RB	1898 British Home Championship

Win	Draw	Loss

==== Key ====
- LB – Left-back
- RB – Right-back
- LH – Left-half
- Capt. – Captain

== Life after football ==
Following his retirement from playing, Parry became a referee in the Birmingham and District League. After he was forced to quit through ill-health, he worked for Oswestry United as a groundsman/caretaker. By 1921, he had fallen on hard times and, after an appeal by the mayor and vicar of Oswestry, Everton granted a donation to him of £10.10.0 and arranged a friendly at Oswestry to raise funds for him. The match was held on 14 April at Oswestry in front of 3,000 spectators with Oswestry winning 1–0.

Parry's health continued to deteriorate and he died on 4 February 1922, leaving a widow and six children. At the Everton board meeting on 7 February, a letter was read from the vicar of Oswestry informing the club of Parry's death. It was "decided that as we had given him assistance last year, the question be left over". He was buried at Oswestry Cemetery in an unmarked grave; with help of contribution by the Everton FC Heritage Society a headstone was unveiled on 1 March 2019.

== Honours ==
Everton

- Football League champions: 1890–91
- Football League runners-up: 1889–90
- Football League runners-up: 1894–95

Newtown

- Welsh Cup finalists: 1897

Aberystwyth Town

- Welsh Cup winners: 1900
