= 1890–91 Everton F.C. season =

English football club season

Everton
1890–91 season
- Manager: Dick Molyneux
- Ground: Anfield
- The Football League: Champions
- FA Cup: First Round
- Top goalscorer: Fred Geary (20)
- Highest home attendance: 16,000 vs Preston (10 January 1891)
- Lowest home attendance: 8,000 vs Wolverhampton (13 September 1890) and Burnley (27 December 1890)
Home colours	Away colours	Third colours

In 1890–91, Everton competed in the Football League's third season, and were crowned champions for the first time by two points over two-time defending champions Preston North End. They also competed in the FA Cup but lost in the first round to Sunderland.

== Regular Football League First team ==
Note: Flags indicate national team as defined under FIFA eligibility rules; some limited exceptions apply. Players may hold more than one non-FIFA nationality.

Pos.	Nation	Player
GK	SCO	Jack Angus 11 appearances in goal
DF	SCO	Andrew Hannah 20 appearances at right back – club captain
DF	SCO	Dan Doyle 20 appearances at left back
MF	SCO	Daniel Kirkwood 19 appearances at right half
MF	ENG	Johnny Holt 21 appearances at centre half
MF	SCO	William Campbell 13 appearances at left half
FW	SCO	Alex Latta 10 appearances at outside right
FW	SCO	Alec Brady 21 appearances at inside right
FW	ENG	Fred Geary ever present centre forward
FW	ENG	Edgar Chadwick ever present inside left
FW	ENG	Alf Milward ever present outside left

== Other members of the title winning squad ==
Note: Flags indicate national team as defined under FIFA eligibility rules; some limited exceptions apply. Players may hold more than one non-FIFA nationality.

Pos.	Nation	Player
MF	WAL	Charlie Parry 13 appearances mostly at left half
GK	SCO	David Jardine 10 appearances in goal
FW	SCO	Jack Elliott 7 appearances mostly at outside right
DF	SCO	Duncan McLean 5 appearances mostly at right back
FW	SCO	Tom Wylie 4 appearances mostly at outside right
FW	SCO	Patrick Gordon 3 appearances mostly at outside right
FW	SCO	Hope Robertson 3 appearances in mostly at outside right
MF	SCO	Alex Lochhead 1 appearance at left half
GK	ENG	Robert Smalley 1 appearance in goal

Having finished the previous season as runners up Everton made just one signing of note during the summer when William Campbell was brought from Bootle to fill the centre half role, which had remained unsettled since George Farmer had been dropped the previous November. Robert Smalley's position in goal was also under threat from an emerging twenty-year-old Scot named Jack Angus while David Kirkwood having lost the battle to secure the inside right birth to Alec Brady, now shared the centre back duties with Charlie Parry

This settled look ensured that there were just two new faces in the opening day 4–1 victory at West Bromwich Albion, Campbell, who scored and Angus who kept goal in the side listed above as the most settled team used that season. The team remained unchanged through the first four games of the campaign, which were all won, before Latta missed the fifth game. Everton still won to take their winning start to five games before being held to a 2–2 draw at Aston Villa. Everton remained unbeaten for their first seven games but their first choice eleven did not play again as a run of three straight defeats saw the return of Robert Smalley for one game in place of Jack Angus before David Jardine was signed in November from Bootle.

Everton completed all bar one of their fixtures before the end of January and had to wait while the nearest challengers for the title, Preston played a series of games to close the gap at the top to two points. Everton's final game of the season was at Burnley on Saturday 14 March 1891 when almost half the 10,000 attendance was made up of visiting Everton fans. The team of Jardine, McLean, Doyle, Lochhead, Holt, Parry, Latta, Brady, Geary, Chadwick and Milward required only a draw but failed, losing 3–2. Preston would themselves have claimed a third consecutive title has they won their fixture at Sunderland but Evertonians, returning to Liverpool by train from Burnley were met with a delighted crowd at the station who informed them that Preston had lost 0–3 and that Everton had won the title for the first time.

There was no official honour for individual players for being crowned champions so the Everton directors had a medal minted for every player The Football League took up the idea the following year and medals have been presented to every championship winning side since.

== The Football League ==
Date	Opponents	Venue	Result F–A	Scorers	Attendance
6 September 1890	West Bromwich Albion	A	4–1	Fred Geary (2), William Campbell, Alec Brady	5,600
13 September 1890	Wolverhampton	H	5–0	Fred Geary (2), Alf Milward (2), Edgar Chadwick	8,000
20 September 1890	Bolton	A	5–0	Fred Geary (2), Alf Milward (2), Alex Latta	12,000
27 September 1890	Accrington	A	2–1	Fred Geary, Alf Milward	5,000
4 October 1890	Derby	H	7–0	Fred Geary (2), Alf Milward (2), David Kirkwood, Alexander Brady, Edgar Chadwick	12,000
11 October 1890	Aston Villa	A	2–2	Fred Geary (2)	5,000
18 October 1890	Bolton	H	2–0	Alexander Brady (2)	12,000
25 October 1890	West Bromwich	H	2–3	Johnny Holt, Alex Latta	9,200
1 November 1890	Notts	A	1–3	Fred Geary	13,000
8 November 1890	Blackburn	A	1–2	Edgar Chadwick	15,000
15 November 1890	Sunderland	H	1–0	Hope Robertson	12,000
22 November 1890	Preston North End	A	0–2		12,000
29 November 1890	Blackburn	H	3–1	Fred Geary (2), Alexander Brady	11,000
6 December 1890	Wolverhampton	A	1–0	Fred Geary	6,500
13 December 1890	Derby	A	6–2	THOMAS WYLIE (4), Fred Geary, Alexander Brady	4,000
20 December 1890	Sunderland	A	0–1		6,500
26 December 1890	Accrington	H	3–2	Alf Milward (2), Edgar Chadwick	14,000
27 December 1890	Burnley	H	7–3	EDGAR CHADWICK (3), Alex Latta (2), Alexander Brady, Alf Milward	8,000
1 January 1891	Aston	H	5–0	Alexander Brady (2), Fred Geary, Edgar Chadwick, Alf Milward	9,000
3 January 1891	Notts	H	4–2	Edgar Chadwick (2), Alf Milward, Fred Geary	12,000
10 January 1891	Preston	H	0–1		16,000
14 March 1891	Burnley	A	2–3	Fred Geary (2)	10,000

== Football Association Challenge Cup ==
Date	Round	Opponents	Venue	Result F–A	Scorers	Attendance
17 January 1891	First	Sunderland	A	0–1		21,000

== Final league table ==
Pos	Team	Pld	W	D	L	GF	GA	GAv	Pts
1	Everton (C)	22	14	1	7	63	29	2.172	29
2	Preston North End	22	12	3	7	44	23	1.913	27
3	Notts County	22	11	4	7	52	35	1.486	26
4	Wolverhampton Wanderers	22	12	2	8	39	50	0.780	26
5	Bolton Wanderers	22	12	1	9	47	34	1.382	25

(C) Champions

== Achievements ==
Despite being crowned champions the 1890/91 team actually picked up fewer points than the side who missed out on the title the previous season. Their title triumph came despite a record losing and winless away run in the middle of the season. The 1891 title side also equalled or set the following club records.

- English Football League Champions for the first time
- Equalled most home points = 18 with 1889–90 team
- Equalled most wins = 14 with 1889–90 team
- Most home wins in a season = 9
- Fewest goals conceded in a season = 29
- Fewest goals conceded at home in a season = 12
- Fewest goals conceded away from home in a season = 17
- Record away League victory = 6–2 at Derby County, 13 December 1890
- Most goals in a single game = 4 by Thomas Wylie at Derby County, 13 December 1890
- Equalled most team hat-tricks in a season = 2 with 1889–90 team
- Hat-tricks = 2 Fred Geary & Thomas Wylie
- Record Everton career League hat-tricks = 2 by Fred Geary 1890 & 1891
- Fewest players used in a season = 20
- Longest home winning sequence = 6 games
- Longest unbeaten sequence = 7 games
- Equalled Longest home unbeaten run = 6 games with 1889–90 team
- Longest sequence of away draws = 1 (with all previous Everton League teams)
- Fewest drawn games in a season = 1
- None of Everton's eleven home games were drawn, matching the 1888–89 team
- Equalled fewest away draws in a season = 1 with the 1889–90 team
- Equalled longest home losing sequence = 1 (with all previous Everton League teams)
- Longest losing sequence away from home = 3
- Equalled longest winless away run = 4 with the 1888–89 team

== Sources ==
- http://www.evertonfc.com/stats/?mode=season&era_id=1&season_id=4&seasons=4
- http://www.allfootballers.com
