= 1891–92 Everton F.C. season =

English football club season

Everton
1891–92 season
- Manager: Dick Molyneux
- The Football League: 5th
- Top goalscorer: Alex Latta (17)
- Highest home attendance: 16,000 vs Preston (10 October 1891) & Sunderland (25 December 1891)
- Lowest home attendance: 4,000 vs Burnley (2 January 1892)
- Average home league attendance: 11.200
Home colours

The 1891–92 Everton F.C. season lists the results of the British association football team Everton F.C. in the 1891–92 season.

== Regular Football League First team ==
Note: Flags indicate national team as defined under FIFA eligibility rules; some limited exceptions apply. Players may hold more than one non-FIFA nationality.

Pos.	Nation	Player
	SCO	David Jardine 17 appearances in goal
	SCO	Duncan McLean 20 appearances at left back, right back and centre half
	ENG	Bob Howarth 11 appearances at left & right back – club debut (5 December 1891)
	SCO	Bob Kelso 23 appearances at right half & right back
	ENG	Johnny Holt 21 appearances at left half
	SCO	Hope Robertson 20 appearances at centre half & right half
	SCO	Alex Latta 25 appearances at outside right and centre forward
	SCO	Tom Wylie 16 appearances at outside right, inside right and inside left
	SCO	Alan Maxwell 16 appearances at inside right & centre forward – club debut (31 October 1891)
	ENG	Edgar Chadwick 25 appearances at inside left
	ENG	Alf Milward Ever present with 26 appearances at outside left

Number of League games in which this eleven was fielded = 1

== The Football League ==
Date	Opponents	Home/Away	Result F – A	Scorers	Attendance
5 September 1891	West Bromwich Albion	A	0–4		6,000
7 September 1891	Darwen	H	5–3	Fred Geary (2), Alf Milward (2), Edgar Chadwick	8,000
19 September 1891	Blackburn	H	3–1	Fred Geary, Alex Latta, Bob Kelso	15,000
26 September 1891	Accrington	A	1–1	Patrick Gordon	3,500
3 October 1891	Sunderland	A	1–2	Fred Geary	10,000
10 October 1891	Preston	H	1–1	Samuel Thomson	16,000
17 October 1891	Bolton	A	0–1		10,000
24 October 1891	Derby County	A	3–0	Alex Latta (2), Edgar Chadwick	7,000
31 October 1891	Preston	A	0–4		1,200
7 November 1891	West Bromwich	H	4–3	Alex Latta (3), Alf Milward	8,100
14 November 1891	Darwen	A	1–3	Alex latta	4,000
21 November 1891	Wolverhampton	A	1–5	Alex Latta	5,000
28 November 1891	Aston	H	5–1	Edgar Chadwick (2), Alex Latta, Thomas Wylie, Alan Maxwell	15,000
5 December 1891	Blackburn	A	2–2	Alex Latta, Jimmy Douglas own goal	6,500
12 December 1891	Wolverhampton	A	2–1	Alex Latta, Edgar Chadwick	10,000
25 December 1891	Sunderland	H	0–4		16,000
28 December 1891	Aston	A	4–3	Alan Maxwell (2), Edgar Chadwick (2)	14,000
2 January 1892	Burnley	H	1–1	Alf Milward	4,000
9 January 1892	Notts	A	3–1	Alf Milward, Alex Latta, Alan Maxwell	4,000
13 February 1892	Burnley	A	0–1		7,000
5 March 1892	Stoke	H	1–0	Edgar Chadwick	7,000
12 March 1892	Stoke	A	1–0	Edgar Chadwick	2,000
19 March 1892	Accrington	H	3–0	Edgar Chadwick (2), Alex Latta	8,000
15 April 1892	Derby	H	1–2	Bob Kelso	12,000
18 April 1892	Bolton	H	2–5	Fred Geary, Alf Milward	12,000
23 April 1892	Notts	H	4–0	Fred Geary, Alex Latta (3)	10,000

== Football Association Challenge Cup ==
Date	Round	Opponents	Home/Away	Result F – A	Scorers	Attendance
23 January 1892	First	Burnley	H	1–3	Alf Milward	8,000

== Final league table ==
		P	W	D	L	F	A	GA	Pts
1	Sunderland	26	21	0	5	93	36	2.583	42
2	Preston North End	26	18	1	7	61	31	1.968	37
3	Bolton Wanderers	26	17	2	7	51	37	1.378	36
4	Aston Villa	26	15	0	11	89	56	1.589	30
5	Everton	26	12	4	10	49	49	1.000	28
6	Wolverhampton Wanderers	26	11	4	11	59	46	1.283	26
7	Burnley	26	11	4	11	49	45	1.089	26
8	Notts County	26	11	4	11	55	51	1.078	26
9	Blackburn Rovers	26	10	6	10	58	65	0.892	26
10	Derby County	26	10	4	12	46	52	0.885	24
11	Accrington	26	8	4	14	40	78	0.513	20
12	West Bromwich Albion	26	6	6	14	51	58	0.879	18
13	Stoke	26	5	4	17	38	61	0.623	14
14	Darwen	26	4	3	19	38	112	0.339	11

== Sources ==
- http://www.evertonfc.com/stats/?mode=season&era_id=1&season_id=4&seasons=4
- http://www.allfootballers.com
