= John Angus (footballer, born 1867) =

Scottish footballer

Personal information
- Full name: John Alexander Angus
- Date of birth: 1867
- Place of birth: King Edward, Aberdeen Scotland
- Date of death: 8 August 1891 (aged 24)
- Position: Goalkeeper

Senior career*
Years	Team	Apps	(Gls)
?-?	King's Park	?	(?)
1887–1890	Sunderland Albion	?	(?)
1890–1891	Everton	11	(0)
Total		11	(0)
- * Club domestic league appearances and goals

John Alexander Angus (1867 – 8 August 1891) was a Scottish footballer who played in the Northern League for Sunderland Albion and the Football League for Everton.

== Everton career ==
Everton's signing of 23-year-old Scottish goalkeeper John Angus from Sunderland Albion was announced in the Liverpool Mercury of 7 April 1890, as Angus joined his new teammates for a pre-season friendly versus Bootle. He lodged with the Williams family and fellow Everton player and Scot, Alex Lochhead, at 6 Skerries Road, adjacent to the Anfield ground where Everton were tenants, shortly before the fallout which forced their move to what would become Goodison Park in 1892.

Angus made his full debut for Everton alongside established stars including Johnny Holt, Fred Geary and Edgar Chadwick in the opening game of the 1890/91 season at Stoney Lane, as the Toffeemen overcame W.B.A. by four goals to one. In the coming weeks, Everton, with Angus between the sticks, stormed to the top of the Division 1 table, winning their next four games by an aggregate score of 19–1, before a 2–2 draw at Aston Villa slowed their progress. A 2–0 win at Bolton was followed by a 3–2 defeat in the return match at Anfield versus W.B.A. and a 1–3 loss at Notts County.

Angus was replaced in goal by Bob Smalley for a 2–1 reverse at Ewood Park versus Blackburn, but returned to keep a clean sheet in a 1–0 home win over Sunderland, a result which restored Everton's position at the top of the table. Angus's final league appearance for Everton came a week later, in a 2–0 defeat at Deepdale versus the mighty Preston side who had won the previous two Division 1 titles and would push Everton all the way in 1890/91. Angus received a kick to the knee in the Preston match, and fellow Scot David Jardine took his place for the following fixture at home to Blackburn. Jardine would keep goal for Everton in the remaining ten league fixtures, helping his side to claim their first league championship title in the process.

John Angus made his final appearance in Everton colours on 17 January 1891, in the club's sole F.A. Cup tie that season, a 1–0 defeat at Newcastle Road—where he played well and was not at fault for a superb winning goal, according to local news reports—fittingly, as fate would have it, versus his old rivals Sunderland.

Tragically, by the time Everton, the newly-crowned champions of England, kicked off their 1891/92 campaign, again at W.B.A, only this time ending up on the wrong end of a 4–0 hiding, Jack Angus would be dead. A short paragraph in the Liverpool Mercury, dated 10 August 1891, reads:

DEATH OF JOHN ANGUS, THE EVERTON GOALKEEPER
John Angus, the Everton Football Club custodian, died at his father's residence, Denny Loanhead, Denny, Scotland, on Saturday. Angus, who was spending the close season at home, was struck by typhoid fever, and gradually growing worse expired at ten o'clock on Saturday night. The deceased began his career in King's Park F.C., but his great fame reaching England he was engaged by Sunderland Albion, with whom he remained for three seasons, when he signed for Everton, in whose team he was last year. He was 24 years of age, unmarried, and was a plumber by trade.

Not to be confused with John William Angus, his contemporary at Everton.
