= William Brown (footballer, born 1865) =

English footballer

Personal information
- Full name: William Brown
- Date of birth: 1865
- Place of birth: Liverpool England
- Position: Outside forward

Senior career*
Years	Team	Apps	(Gls)
1887	Stanley (Liverpool) F.C.		
1888–1889	Everton	6	(1)
- * Club domestic league appearances and goals

William Brown was an English footballer who played in the Football League for Everton.

== Background ==
Brown was a reserve outside-left at Everton during the inaugural Football League season. He was signed between 1887 and 1888 from Stanley (Liverpool) Football Club. He played six times mainly at outside-left.

== League & Everton Debut ==
Outside-left was one of three problem forward positions for Everton and probably explains why Everton struggled to score goals in the 1888–1889 season. James Costley was injured after a 6–2 home win over Derby County. On 3 November 1888 Bolton Wanderers were the visitors to Anfield and this match gave William Brown a chance for his League and Everton debut. He played outside-left. Very little happened in the first half and the scores were level, 0–0 at half-time. Early in the second-half Brown crowned his debut with a debut League goal putting a shot past Bolton goalkeeper, Sam Gillam. Bolton played well after Brown scored and quickly equalised. Brown formed a good partnership with Everton inside-left, Edgar Chadwick but it was Nick Ross who scored the winner with a powerful shot. Everton pressed for a third but it was Bolton who came closest to scoring. Everton hung on to the lead in a close fought match. Final score - Everton 2-1 Bolton Wanderers.

== Playing Record ==
Brown's debut saw him play three successive matches at left-wing for Everton but he was left out/injured after a 2–2 draw at Turf Moor, Burnley. Brown returned to the team on 22 December 1888 for the trip to Deepdale, Preston but he now played centre-forward (another of Everton' problem positions) in place of R Morris. He played two games at centre-forward but was replaced by Jack Angus. His final appearance was for the visit of Wolverhampton Wanderers on 9 February 1889. He replaced Jack Angus at outside-left. Everton lost 2–1. Everton finished eighth in the League Scoring 35 goals, the second lowest tally by a League team in that first season.

== After Football ==
Brown was not retained for the 1889–1890 season and disappears from the records.
