= Walter Wilson (footballer, born 1865) =

English footballer

Personal information
- Date of birth: 1865
- Position: Full back

Senior career*
Years	Team	Apps	(Gls)
1889	Everton	1	(0)
- * Club domestic league appearances and goals

Walter Wilson was an English footballer who played in the Football League for Everton.

== Early career ==
Walter Wilson was an Everton reserve player. He was not retained for season 1889–1890.

== League debut ==
Walter Wilson made his League Debut on 30 March 1889 at Anfield, Liverpool against Blackburn Rovers. It was Everton' last match of the 1888–1889 season. Wilson was left-back, replacing Alec Dick. The match was originally scheduled for 5 January 1889 but the referee would not allow the match to start as the pitch was covered in ice. Alf Milward put Everton ahead but Blackburn soon equalised. Half-time - Everton 1-1 Blackburn Rovers. The second-half belonged to Everton. David Waugh restored Everton' lead and Joe Davies made it 3–1. Everton cruised after that to achieve a comfortable win against one of that season' top teams. Full-Time Everton 3-1 Blackburn Rovers.

== 1888-1889 Season ==
Wilson played just the one match, at left-back, for Everton and when he played his team conceded 1 out of 47 goals conceded for the season. Everton finished eighth in the League.

== End of career ==
Walter Wilson was not retained for 1889-1890 and nothing is known about him after he left Everton.
