= George Davie (footballer) =

English footballer

George Alexander Davie
Personal information
- Full name: George Davie
- Date of birth: 19 April 1864
- Place of birth: Cardross, Scotland
- Position: Centre-forward

Senior career*
Years	Team	Apps	(Gls)
1887	Renton		
1888–1889	Everton	2	(0)
1889–1890	Sunderland		
1890–1891	Renton		
1891–1892	Royal Arsenal		
- * Club domestic league appearances and goals

George Davie was an English footballer who played in the Football League for Everton.

== Background ==
George Davie was signed by Everton to strengthen their attack.

== League & Everton debut ==
Centre-forward was a problem position for Everton in 1888–89. He was the eighth player to play at centre-forward when he was picked to lead the attack against Burnley on 24 November 1888 at Anfield, Liverpool. Everton won the toss and played with the wind at their backs. It worked. Edgar Chadwick made it 1–0, J Coyne added the second and James Costley made it three via a deflection. Everton 3–0 Burnley at half-time. With the wind at their backs Burnley got into the game and reduced Everton's first-half lead to 3–2. There were chances at both ends but it finished Everton 3–2 Burnley.

== Playing record ==
Davie played two in a row at centre-forward. However after the beating Everton took from West Bromwich Albion (4-1) at Anfield on 1 December 1888 Davie was dropped for the rest of the season. Everton finished eighth in the League scoring 35 goals, the second lowest tally by a League team in that first season.

== After Everton ==
Davie left Everton in April 1889 and joined Sunderland. He never played top-flight football again.
