= Roberts (footballer) =

English footballer

Ike Roberts
Personal information
- Full name: Isaac Roberts
- Date of birth: c. 1865
- Place of birth: Ryleys Gardens, Liverpool
- Date of death: 14/01/1896
- Position: Centre half

Senior career*
Years	Team	Apps	(Gls)
1889	Everton	1	(0)
- * Club domestic league appearances and goals

Isaac Roberts was an English footballer who played in the Football League for Everton.

== Background ==
Roberts was a reserve centre-half at Everton during the inaugural Football League season. He got his chance to play at the end of the season.

== League & Everton debut ==
Johnny Holt, the regular Everton centre-half, missed a few games due to injury and the visit of high-flying Wolverhampton Wanderers to Anfield on 9 February 1889 was one of those games missed. This gave Roberts a chance for his League and Everton debut in a match played on a frosty pitch that today - February 2018 - would not be played. Nick Ross, the Everton left-back, was missing playing for Lancashire County. The first half was end-to-end with both goalkeepers in action. However, as the half came to an end Edgar Chadwick put Everton ahead. 1-0 to Everton at half-time. Everton continued to press the Wolves defence and only Billy Rose, the Wolves goalkeeper kept Everton from extending their lead. In the last 20 minutes Rose's good work paid off when Wolverhampton equalised. With the match nearly over and the game heading for a draw Wolverhampton stunned Everton with a winner which Everton players claimed was off-side. Final score - Everton 1-2 Wolverhampton Wanderers.

== Playing record ==
Roberts only played once. When he left Everton is unknown and what happened to him after he left Everton is also unknown. Everton finished eighth in the League conceding 47 goals in 1888-1889.
