= Hugh Pollock =

Hugh Pollock may refer to:

- Hugh MacDowell Pollock (1852–1937), Ulster Unionist member of the Parliament of Northern Ireland
- Hugh Alexander Pollock (1888–1971), British Army officer and publishing editor
- Hugh Pollock (footballer) (1865–1910), Scottish footballer
