= Charles Jolliffe =

English footballer

Personal information
- Full name: Charles James Jolliffe
- Date of birth: 1861
- Place of birth: Liverpool, England
- Date of death: 1943 (aged 81–82)
- Position: Goalkeeper

Senior career*
Years	Team	Apps	(Gls)
1885–1889	Everton	5	(0)
- * Club domestic league appearances and goals

Charles James Jolliffe (1861–1943) was an English footballer who played in the Football League for Everton.

== Background ==
Charles Jolliffe was a tall, lean footballer for Everton in the pre-Football League era. He was the number one choice as goalkeeper between October 1885 and October 1887. He lost his place to Robert Smalley as the Football League era dawned.

== League Debut ==
Robert Smalley was Everton's regular goalkeeper in 1888–89. However, in match seven, the trip to County Ground, Derby Robert Smalley was injured so Jolliffe got the chance to make his Football League debut. The opponents were Derby County and the date was 20 October 1888. Derby County were described as a "poor side" by the commentators of that time and James Costley soon put Everton ahead. He then scored his second to give Everton a comfortable lead. As the half wore on Derby County improved and Jolliffe conceded his first League goal to William Chatterton. 2–1 at half-time. The second half was more of the same however before Alex McKinnon put Everton 3-1 up Jolliffe made a fine save from Lawrence Plackett. Edgar Chadwick made it 4-1 before Joliffe conceded his second goal from George Bakewell. The final score 4–2 to Everton, their first away League win.

== Playing Record ==
Jolliffe was left out for the return home game against Derby County as Robert Smalley was fit again. He got his second chance to play when Robert Smalley was injured for the second time that season, after the defeat to Preston North End. He played in goal at Accrington (lost 3-1), made his Anfield League debut in a 2–1 win over Stoke. His final game of 1888-1889 was losing 2–0 to Preston North End at Anfield. He played four times for Everton, assisting them to finish eighth in the League and Everton conceded 47 goals. Jolliffe made only one appearance in 1889-1890 and retired from football after the 1889–1890 season finished.
