= 1890–91 in English football =

Football in England
- Season: 1890–91

Men's football
- Football League: Everton
- FA Cup: Blackburn Rovers

The 1890–91 season was the 20th season of competitive football in England.

== Events ==
Everton started the 1890–91 season in superb form with five straight victories, with Fred Geary scoring in each of the first six matches. By mid-January, Everton had completed all but one of their fixtures and were on 29 points, while Preston North End were eleven points adrift with seven games still to play. Everton then had to sit out the next two months as Preston completed their fixture list until they were only two points adrift with one match each left to play. Both teams played their final games of the season on 14 March, with Everton losing 3–2 at Burnley (Geary scored both Everton goals) and Preston going down 3–0 at Sunderland. Everton were thus able to win the Football League Championship for the first time, by a margin of two points with fourteen victories from their 22 league games.

== National team ==
In the 1891 British Home Championship, for the second time England played matches against Wales and Ireland on the same day, 7 March 1891, winning both comfortably.

=== Wales ===
England awarded six new caps for the Welsh game, including the Everton left wing pairing of Edgar Chadwick and Alf Milward. For three of the débutantes, Leonard Wilkinson (goalkeeper) of Oxford University, Thomas Porteous of Sunderland and Elphinstone Jackson of Oxford University, this was their single England appearance. The final débutante was Albert Smith of Nottingham Forest, who made the first of 3 appearances at right-half.

=== Ireland ===
For the Irish match, for which England selected a predominantly Midlands based team, another five players made their debut, of which Joseph Marsden of Darwen and Jem Bayliss of West Bromwich Albion (both defenders) were not selected again. The other débutantes were Alf Underwood of Stoke at left-back, George Cotterill of Cambridge University, who made the first of 4 appearances at centre-forward (scoring on his debut) and fellow forward Arthur Henfrey (Corinthian) (who also scored on his debut). This was also Tinsley Lindley's final England appearance, which he marked by scoring 2 goals, as England were comfortable 6–1 victors.

=== Scotland ===
Scotland also beat Wales and Ireland, so, once again, the England v. Scotland match, played at Ewood Park, Blackburn on 6 April 1891, was the championship decider. England selected an experienced team including four players from the Everton side who had recently won the Football League championship, although, rather surprisingly considering the venue, no players were selected from the Blackburn Rovers side who had won the FA Cup in the final on 21 March. England took an early lead and were 2–0 up at half time and, although Scotland pulled a goal back through Frank Watt late in the game, England managed to hang on in a close game to clinch victory and the championship.

Date	Venue	Opponents	Score*	Comp	England scorers
7 March 1891	Newcastle Road, Sunderland (H)	Wales	4–1	BHC	John Goodall (Derby County) (7 mins), Jack Southworth (Blackburn Rovers) (30 mins), Edgar Chadwick (Everton) (35 mins) & Alf Milward (Everton) (37 mins)
7 March 1891	Molineux, Wolverhampton (H)	Ireland	6–1	BHC	Tinsley Lindley (Nottingham Forest) (2), Billy Bassett (West Bromwich Albion), George Cotterill (Cambridge University), Arthur Henfrey (Corinthian) & Harry Daft (Notts County)
6 April 1891	Ewood Park, Blackburn (H)	Scotland	2–1	BHC	John Goodall (Derby County) (20 mins) & Edgar Chadwick (Everton) (30 mins)

* England score given first

Key

- H = Home match
- BHC = British Home Championship

== League tables ==
=== The Football League ===
Pos	Team	Pld	W	D	L	GF	GA	GAv	Pts	Qualification
1	Everton (C)	22	14	1	7	63	29	2.172	29	
2	Preston North End	22	12	3	7	44	23	1.913	27	
3	Notts County	22	11	4	7	52	35	1.486	26	
4	Wolverhampton Wanderers	22	12	2	8	39	50	0.780	26	
5	Bolton Wanderers	22	12	1	9	47	34	1.382	25	
6	Blackburn Rovers	22	11	2	9	52	43	1.209	24	
7	Sunderland	22	10	5	7	51	31	1.645	23 (Note: Sunderland were deducted two points for fielding an unregistered player.)	
8	Burnley	22	9	3	10	52	63	0.825	21	
9	Aston Villa	22	7	4	11	45	58	0.776	18	Re-elected
10	Accrington	22	6	4	12	28	50	0.560	16	Re-elected
11	Derby County	22	7	1	14	47	81	0.580	15	Re-elected
12	West Bromwich Albion	22	5	2	15	34	57	0.596	12	Re-elected

(C) Champions

=== The Football Alliance ===
Pos	Team	Pld	W	D	L	GF	GA	GAv	Pts	Qualification or relegation
1	Stoke (C, E)	22	13	7	2	57	39	1.462	33	Elected to the Football League
2	Sunderland Albion	22	12	6	4	69	28	2.464	30	Left to join the Northern League
3	Grimsby Town	22	11	5	6	43	27	1.593	27	
4	Birmingham St George's	22	12	2	8	64	62	1.032	26	
5	Nottingham Forest	22	9	7	6	66	39	1.692	23 (Note: Nottingham Forest were deducted two points for fielding an unregistered player.)	
6	Darwen (E)	22	10	3	9	64	59	1.085	23	Elected to the Football League
7	Walsall Town Swifts	22	9	3	10	34	61	0.557	21	
8	Crewe Alexandra	22	8	4	10	59	67	0.881	20	
9	Newton Heath	22	7	3	12	37	55	0.673	17	
10	Small Heath	22	7	2	13	58	66	0.879	16	
11	Bootle	22	3	7	12	40	61	0.656	13	
12	The Wednesday	22	4	5	13	39	66	0.591	13	

Rules for classification: 1) points; 2) goal average.
(C) Champions; (E) Elected to the Football League
