= William Briscoe =

William Briscoe may refer to:

- Billy Briscoe (1896–1994), English footballer
- Billy Briscoe (Australian footballer) (1892–1943), Australian rules footballer
- William Briscoe (footballer) (c. 1864–?), English footballer
- William Briscoe (politician) (c. 1606–1688), MP for Carlisle
- William E. Briscoe (c. 1869–1938), American politician from Maryland

== See also ==
- Briscoe (disambiguation)
