= Jas Coyne =

English footballer

Personal information
- Full name: James Coyne
- Date of birth: 1864
- Place of birth: Lincolnshire, England
- Position: Inside right

Senior career*
Years	Team	Apps	(Gls)
1886	Vale of Leven		
1888	Everton	2	(1)
1888–?	Ulster		
- * Club domestic league appearances and goals

James Coyne (born 1864; date of death unknown) was an English footballer who played for Vale of Leven, Everton and Ulster.

Coyne was a reserve player at Everton. He made his League debut at Anfield, Liverpool for the visit of Burnley on 24 November 1888, replacing Robert Watson who was injured. Everton won the toss and made Burnley play into the wind. The tactic worked and Everton led 3–0 at half-time. Edgar Chadwick opened the scoring and Coyne added the second soon after. The third goal, scored towards the end of the half, was scored by James Costley. Burnley, with the wind now at their backs got back into the match with two goals. With play end-to-end Everton hung on to win 3–2.

Coyne was retained for the next match, the visit of West Bromwich Albion, but this was a disaster. Everton lost at Anfield for the first time in a League game and were well beaten 4–1. Coyne never played a League match after that.

Everton finished 8th in the Football League, scoring 36 goals in 22 games (second lowest that season) and conceding 46 goals.

After Everton, Coyne moved to Ulster and played against Glentoran on 15 December 1888. Ten days later, on Christmas Day, he returned to Liverpool to play in a friendly against his old club.
