= R. Morris (footballer) =

English footballer

Personal information
- Date of birth: c. 1864
- Position: Forward

Senior career*
Years	Team	Apps	(Gls)
1888–1889	Everton	1	(0)
- * Club domestic league appearances and goals

R. Morris was an English footballer who played in the Football League for Everton. He made just one appearance for Everton which came in a 0–0 draw with Stoke on 15 December 1888.

Morris made his debut for Everton in the league at Victoria Ground in Stoke, during the match against Stoke on 15 December 1888. Morris replaced George Davie, who was out of favour. The game was described by a commentator of the time as "dull fare". The weather was damp and foggy, the pitch was heavy and apart from some good saves by Stoke goalkeeper, Billy Rowley the "entertainment on offer was of a mediocre fare". In the second-half, James Costley of Everton was badly injured and went off leaving Everton to play with ten men. With ten minutes to go the referee stopped the match as it was too dark to see the ball. The few spectators left must have breathed a sigh of relief.

Morris was not retained for the next match, and he never played a League match after that.

Everton finished 8th in the Football League scoring 36 goals in 22 games (second lowest that season).
