= Michael Higgins =

Michael, Mick or Mike Higgins may refer to:

== Actors ==
- Michael Higgins (actor) (1920–2008), stage actor best known for his performance in the 1974 Broadway production of Equus
- John Michael Higgins (born 1963), American actor and voice actor

== Athletes ==
- Mike Higgins (footballer) (1862–?), English footballer
- Pinky Higgins (Michael Franklin Higgins, 1909–1969), American baseball player and manager
- Mick Higgins (Australian footballer) (1911–1989), Australian rules footballer
- Mick Higgins (1923–2010), Cavan Gaelic footballer and coach
- Mike Higgins (basketball) (born 1967), American professional basketball player
- Michael Higgins (American football) (born 1987), American football tight end
- Michael Higgins (Galway footballer), captain of the 1934 All Ireland champions.

== Politicians ==
- Michael D. Higgins (born 1941), ninth President of Ireland
- Mike Higgins (Jersey politician)

== Others ==
- Michael Higgins (glass artist) (1908–1999), American artist
- Michael Higgins (priest) (born 1935), Anglican priest
- Michael W. Higgins (born 1948), Canadian academic and President of St Thomas University

== See also ==
- Michael S. Longuet-Higgins (1925–2016), British mathematician and oceanographer
- Michael O'Higgins (disambiguation)
