= Michael O'Higgins (disambiguation) =

Michael O'Higgins (1917–2005) was an Irish Fine Gael politician.

Michael O'Higgins may also refer to:

- Michael O'Higgins (economist), Irish economist
- Michéal Ó hUiginn (born 1942), Irish Fianna Fáil politician
- Mícheál O'Higgins, Irish judge

== See also ==
- Michael Higgins (disambiguation)
