= Fred Geary =

English footballer (1868–1955)

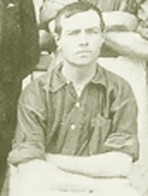
- Geary in a Liverpool team photo

Personal information
- Date of birth: 23 January 1868
- Place of birth: Hyson Green, England
- Date of death: 8 January 1955 (aged 86)
- Height: 5 ft 2 in (1.57 m)
- Position: Centre forward

Youth career
- Balmoral (Nottingham)

Senior career*
| Years | Team | Apps | (Gls) |
| 1886–1887 | Notts Rangers | | |
| 1887–1888 | Grimsby Town | | |
| 1888–1889 | Notts Rangers | | |
| 1889 | Notts County | 0 | (0) |
| 1889 | Notts Rangers | | |
| 1889–1895 | Everton | 91 | (78) |
| 1895–1896 | Liverpool | 39 | (14) |

International career
| 1890–1891 | England | 2 | (3) |
- * Club domestic league appearances and goals

Fred Geary (23 January 1868 – 8 January 1955) was an English professional footballer who played at centre forward for Everton in the 1890s, and made two appearances for England, scoring a hat-trick on his debut.

At Everton, Geary was a prolific goal-scorer, with 86 goals in 99 appearances, helping them to win the Football League championship for the first time in 1890–91. He was "the first Everton centre-forward to capture the imagination of their supporters" and "in his era he was as important to Everton as Dixie Dean was some years later".

== Football career ==
=== Early days ===
Geary was born at Hyson Green, on the outskirts of Nottingham. As a boy he won many sprinting titles on the athletics track, and was to use this speed to great effect during his football career. He played youth football for local side Balmoral before joining Notts Rangers. After spells with Grimsby Town and Notts County, he returned to Notts Rangers in 1888, where he played in front of future England internationals Alf and Charles Shelton. Everton had tried to sign him earlier, and eventually persuaded Geary to move to Liverpool in 1889.

=== Everton ===
Everton had finished in a disappointing eighth position in the inaugural Football League season, having scored only 35 goals and the directors "were determined to improve upon their indifferent performances", especially in front of the goal, by recruiting Geary, along with Scotsman Alex Latta (from Dumbarton) and Welshman Charlie Parry (from Chester St Oswalds). Geary had first been spotted at Grimsby Town, but had moved back to Notts Rangers before he was persuaded to join Everton.

Geary was described as "small and powerful", standing at barely 5 ft 2 in and weighing 9 st 6 lb. He relied on his pace and acceleration to get away from defenders and, according to the Liverpool Echo, "his team-mates complained that he was sometimes too quick, leaving the ball or his strike partners behind with his turbo-charged bursts".

Geary made his Football League debut for Everton on 7 September 1889 at home (then at Anfield) to Blackburn Rovers and scored twice in a 3–2 victory. He soon began to form a prolific scoring partnership with Latta, well supported by Edgar Chadwick and Alf Milward, and later in the season by Alexander Brady. Geary scored regularly throughout the season, including a hat-trick in an 8–0 demolition of Stoke City on 4 November. He ended the season with 21 league goals in 18 matches, as Everton finished runners-up, two points behind Preston North End. Geary had also scored four FA Cup goals, including a hat-trick in an 11–2 victory over Derby County on 18 January (with three goals also from Milward and Brady). This remains Everton's highest margin of victory in any competition.

On 15 March 1890, Geary was called up by the England selectors to play against Ireland in the 1890 British Home Championship. England also played against Wales on the same day, and the selectors picked a mainly amateur team to play at Wrexham (winning 3–1), while the players selected for the match against the Irish at Ballynafeigh Park, Belfast were mainly professional, including five players from Blackburn Rovers. England easily overcame the Irish by a 9–1 margin, with Geary scoring a hat-trick, and a pair each from William Townley and Kenny Davenport. The Irish goal was scored by Jack Reynolds, who later played for England. According to Cris Freddi, "a (not altogether coherent) match report in The Field credits Geary with four goals, and a (very confused) summary in The Athletic News maintains that 'the clever little Everton centre was responsible for five of the goals, and beauties they were'." Despite the margin of victory, the England selectors did not use any of the team that defeated the Irish for the next match against Scotland, preferring the team that had played against Wales. The match against Scotland was a 1–1 draw, and, thus, England and Scotland shared the 1890 British Home Championship title.

Geary started the 1890–91 season in superb form, scoring in each of the first six matches as Everton started the season with five straight victories. By mid-January, Everton had completed all but one of their fixtures and were on 29 points, while Preston North End were eleven points adrift with seven games still to play. Everton than had to sit out the next two months as Preston completed their fixture list until they were only two points adrift with one match each left to play. Both teams played their final games of the season on 14 March, with Everton losing 3–2 at Burnley (Geary scored both Everton goals) and Preston going down 3–0 at Sunderland. Everton were thus able to win the Football League Championship for the first time, by a margin of two points with fourteen victories from their 22 league games. Geary had been ever-present, and was the club's top goal-scorer with 21 goals.

Geary earned his second (and last) England cap for the match against Scotland on 6 April 1891. Although the match was played at Ewood Park, Blackburn, not one Blackburn player was selected, with the selectors opting for four players from Everton's championship winning team, with Geary lining up alongside Edgar Chadwick and Alf Milward (with Johnny Holt in defence). In a close game, England managed to hold on to a 2–1 victory with goals from John Goodall (Derby County) and Chadwick.

Geary started the 1891–92 season well, with four goals from the first five games until injury put him out of action for several months, with Alan Maxwell taking his place. Geary was able to return for the last five games of the season, scoring twice more as Everton ended the season in fifth place.

In the summer of 1892, Everton move out of their original home at Anfield after John Houlding, the leaseholder of the stadium, purchased the ground outright and proposed increasing the rent from £100 to £250 per year. Everton, who had played at Anfield for seven years, refused to meet his demands and moved to Goodison Park. Geary scored the first goal at the new stadium in a friendly against Bolton Wanderers to celebrate the opening. The first league game at Goodison Park took place on 3 September 1892 with Nottingham Forest supplying the opposition. The game ended in a 2–2 draw with the honour of scoring the first competitive goal at Goodison going to Forest's Horace Pike, with the first Everton goal coming from Geary. The team's first league victory at their new ground came in the next home game when they crushed Newton Heath 6–0, with Geary and Chadwick each scoring twice.

Geary failed to score for the next six games, before he and Alex Latta each scored hat-tricks in a 6–1 victory over Derby County on 5 November. Geary ended the league season as the club's top scorer (for the third time in four seasons) with 19 goals from 24 league appearances, as Everton finished third in the league table. Geary played in the first three matches of the FA Cup run, scoring four goals before a leg injury resulted in him missing the semi-final against Preston North End. Everton eventually defeated Preston after a second replay to set up a final against Wolverhampton Wanderers. Although Geary was now fit, he was not picked for the Final to be played at Fallowfield, Manchester on 25 March, with Alan Maxwell retaining his place at centre-forward. Wolves won the match with a goal from their captain, Harry Allen, as the Everton forwards were unable to break down Wolves' defence.

Injury prevented Geary making an appearance at the start of the 1893–94 season, and he lost his place at centre-forward to Jack Southworth who had arrived from Blackburn Rovers during the summer. Geary's first game of the season was against Burnley on 25 November 1893, when he scored in a 4–3 victory. He retained his place for the next two matches, before Southworth returned to the side. Geary completed the season having played only nine matches, scoring eight goals. The season ended with Everton in a disappointing sixth place, with Southworth top scorer in the Football League with a tally of 27 goals from just 22 games.

Injury again kept Geary out of the team until January 1895, and he was only able to make eight appearances with four goals in his final season at Goodison Park. His final appearance came on 13 April 1895, when he scored in a 2–3 defeat to Derby County. In his Everton career, he made 99 appearances in league and cup matches, scoring 86 goals.

=== Liverpool ===
In May 1895, he signed for Liverpool (who had just been relegated to the Second Division) for a fee of £60, making his debut in a 2–3 defeat at Notts County on 7 September. His first goals came when he was one of three players who scored twice in a 6–0 victory over Crewe Alexandra on 7 October. He made a total of 19 league appearances in 1895–96, scoring 11 goals as Liverpool took the Second Division title. Liverpool then had to play a series of "Test matches" against Small Heath and West Bromwich Albion with Liverpool securing their promotion at the expense of Small Heath.

By now his pace had been eroded and he was stricken by injuries, and he was only selected eight times as Liverpool finished fifth in the First Division at the end of the 1896–97 season. He made a further twelve appearances over the next two seasons, before his last appearance for Liverpool on 17 September 1898. In his four seasons at Anfield he made a total of 45 appearances with 14 goals.

== Later life ==
Geary subsequently returned to Goodison Park as a groundsman.

He died on 8 January 1955, a fortnight short of his 87th birthday.

== Honours ==
Everton

- Football League champions: 1890–91

Liverpool

- Football League Second Division champions: 1895–96
