= Joe Davies (footballer, born 1870) =

Welsh footballer

Personal information
- Full name: Joseph Davies
- Date of birth: 1870
- Place of birth: Chirk, Wales
- Height: 5 ft 6 1/2 in (1.69 m)
- Position: Inside right

Youth career
- 1887: Chirk

Senior career*
| Years | Team | Apps | (Gls) |
| 1888–1889 | Everton | 8 | (2) |
| 1889–1891 | Chirk | | |
| 1891–1894 | Ardwick | 38 | (15) |
| 1894–1895 | Sheffield United | 12 | (4) |
| 1895–1896 | Manchester City | 11 | (4) |
| 1896–1898 | Millwall Athletic | | |
| 1898–1900 | Reading | | |
| 1900–1901 | Manchester City | 8 | (1) |
| 1901–1902 | Stockport County | 29 | (7) |
| 1902–1905 | Chirk | | |

International career
| 1889–1900 | Wales | 11 | (0) |
- * Club domestic league appearances and goals

Joseph Davies (born 1870; date of death unknown) was a Welsh international footballer who played as an inside right.

== Career ==
=== Early career ===
Born in Chirk in Wales, Davies worked as a miner whilst playing for his hometown club of Chirk.

== Everton & league debut ==
Joe Davies made his League Debut on 1 December 1888 at Anfield, Liverpool against West Bromwich Albion. Davies was at outside-right. The first half was pretty much one-way traffic and although Everton had some attacks West Bromwich Albion dominated putting three past Everton goalkeeper Robert Smalley before half-time. Half-time: Everton 0–3 West Bromwich Albion. Everton hoped to lead a revival in the second half but suffered two major setbacks. Frank Sugg went off with an injured right foot and then James Costley had to withdraw leaving Everton with just nine men. Edgar Chadwick gave Everton some hope with an early goal. Everton tried to get a second goal but were not successful and towards the end with only nine men West Brom scored a fourth through a goalmouth scrimmage. Full-time: Everton 1–4 West Bromwich Albion.

== 1888–1889 season ==
Joe Davies debuted at outside-right and played that game and the week after. After the draw at Stoke City on 15 December 1888 Davies was left out until 12 January 1889 when he returned at outside-right for the home game against Stoke. In the second half, Joe Davies got a headed goal which was the winner in a 2–1 victory. Joe Davies played out the season at outside-right playing six games in a row and scoring two goals.

Davies played eight matches for Everton and when he played his team scored 7 goals (out of 35) (including 2 of his own). The 35 goals scored was the second lowest tally by any League club that season. Everton finished eighth.

== 1889 onwards ==
His spell on Merseyside was a brief one, and he returned to Chirk in 1889, remaining there for two further years.

A three-year spell at Ardwick followed before he was transferred to Sheffield United in January 1894.

The Blades were playing in the Football League First Division by this stage and Davies never cemented himself as a first team player, making only 18 appearances despite seven goals during them. He was suspended by United in September 1895 for "lodging in a public house" (the club was run on strict Methodist lines at the time), before being transferred back to Ardwick, now renamed Manchester City, in the following November along with Hugh Morris and Bob Hill.

Davies subsequently became a much travelled player with spells at Millwall Athletic (1896–98), Reading (1898–1900), a third spell at Manchester City (1900–1901), Stockport County (1901–1902) where he made the majority of his career Football League appearances, before finally returning to Chirk for a third time in 1902 where he played until retiring in 1905.

=== International career ===
Davies made his international debut for Wales on 15 April 1889, playing in a 0–0 draw with Scotland in Wrexham. He went on to play eleven times in total for his country without scoring a goal.
