= George Stephenson (footballer, born 1865) =

English footballer

Personal information
- Full name: George Stephenson
- Date of birth: 1865
- Position: Right-half

Senior career*
| Years | Team | Apps | (Gls) |
| 1888–1889 | Everton | 1 | (0) |
- * Club domestic league appearances and goals

George Stephenson (born 1865) was an English footballer who played in the Football League for Everton.

== Background ==
George Stephenson was signed by Everton in September 1888 as a reserve player.

== League & Everton Debut ==
Jimmy Weir was Everton's regular right-half in 1888–1889. He was injured in mid-January 1889 and missed the visit of Preston North End, his replacement was Bob Kelso. Weir also missed the trip to play high-flying Wolverhampton Wanderers and that is where George Stephenson got his chance to make his League and Everton debut. The date was 26 January 1889. Everton, kicking into the wind, could not make it a contest and Wolverhampton were 4-0 up at half-time. The second half was a bit more of a match as Everton had the wind at their backs but they could not score and when they conceded a fifth goal the players on both sides lost interest.

== Playing Record ==
Stephenson played the one match for Everton, assisting them to finish eighth in the League and Everton scored 35 goals in the season, the second lowest total and conceded 47 goals. Stephenson was not retained at the end of the season and disappears from the records.
