= Jimmy Weir (footballer, born 1864) =

Scottish footballer

Personal information
- Place of birth: Scotland
- Position: Inside forward

Senior career*
| Years | Team | Apps | (Gls) |
| 1887–1889 | Dumbarton | | |
| 1889 | Gateshead | | |
| 1889–1891 | Sunderland Albion | | |
- Dunblane
- * Club domestic league appearances and goals

James Weir, known as Jimmy Weir, was a Scottish footballer. (Note: His details have been confused with those of John Weir of Third Lanark and Everton in some sources.)

He is known to have played in the Scottish Cup for Dumbarton in 1888 before moving to England to sign for Gateshead, soon switching to Sunderland Albion. He later returned to Scotland with Dunblane.
