= Wilfred Oldham =

English footballer

Personal information
- Full name: Wilfred Oldham
- Date of birth: 1879
- Place of birth: Accrington, England
- Position: Centre forward

Senior career*
Years	Team	Apps	(Gls)
1898–1900	Everton	22	(11)
1900–1901	Blackburn Rovers	9	(1)
1901–1904	Padiham		
1904	Oswaldtwistle Rovers		
Total		31	(12)
- * Club domestic league appearances and goals

Wilfred Oldham (1879–unknown) was an English footballer who played in the Football League for Blackburn Rovers and Everton.
