= John Weir (footballer) =

Scottish footballer

Personal information
- Full name: John Weir
- Date of birth: 10 January 1865
- Place of birth: Crossmyloof, Scotland
- Date of death: 11 January 1946 (aged 81)
- Place of death: Newchurch, Lancashire, England
- Positions: Half-back; centre half

Youth career
- Wellpark

Senior career*
Years	Team	Apps	(Gls)
1884–1887	Third Lanark		
1887	Bootle		
1887–1890	Everton	19	(0)
1890–1891	High Park		
1891–1895	Rossendale		
1895–1896	Rawtenstall		

International career
1887	Scotland	1	(0)

Managerial career
- 1891–1895: Rossendale
- * Club domestic league appearances and goals

John Weir (10 January 1865 – 11 January 1946) was a Scottish footballer who played as a half-back. (Note: His details have been confused with those of Jimmy Weir of Dumbarton and Sunderland Albion in some sources.)

== Career ==
Weir initially played club football in Glasgow for Third Lanark, and made one appearance for Scotland in February 1887; he took part in a trial the following month but had no further international recognition.

In around August 1887 he moved south to England, initially joining Bootle before soon being tempted to sign for Everton along with another former Third Lanark player Robert Izatt, much to the annoyance of Bootle. At the same time Everton eliminated Bolton Wanderers from the 1887–88 FA Cup but following a protest were found to have several professionals in their ranks – against the rules of the time – and these players, including Weir (who by then had been injured in a match against Bootle), Izatt and other Scotsmen, had their registrations suspended while Everton were disqualified from the competition.

Most of the Scottish players left the area but Weir remained on Merseyside, was re-instated and played for the club in 16 of their 22 fixtures in the first season of the Football League in 1888–89 (Everton finished eighth of twelve teams). His elder brother Charles, a former Third Lanark teammate, featured for the Toffees reserve team for the latter part of the season (joining after playing against them in a friendly) but was not retained.

Weir played in the first three matches of the next campaign but then suffered a badly broken arm which caused him to miss the rest of the season and also impacted his trade as blacksmith. He appeared the following April in the Liverpool Senior Cup final, a victory over his old club Bootle, but was then released by the club. He spent a season with non-league High Park (Southport) then served Rossendale of the Lancashire League as player-manager for four seasons, the highlight of his time there being a 7–1 victory over local rivals Bury in the early rounds of the 1892–93 FA Cup. His family settled in the area, where he died in 1946.
