= Harry Warmby =

English footballer

Personal information
- Full name: William Henry Warmby
- Date of birth: 1863
- Place of birth: Rotherham, Yorkshire
- Date of death: 19 May 1916 (aged 52–53)
- Position: Defender

Senior career*
Years	Team	Apps	(Gls)
1883	Rotherham		
1884	Derby County		
1888	Everton	1	(0)
- * Club domestic league appearances and goals

Harry Warmby was an English footballer who played in The Football League for Everton.

Harry Warmby was born in 1863. He played a few games for Rotherham before joining Derby St. Luke's where Derby County signed him from in 1884, although he played a few more games with the Luke's. During his three seasons with Derby he played in 9 FA Cup games as well as 2 games in the Birmingham & District FA Cup and 1 in the Derbyshire County FA Senior Cup before leaving for Everton in June 1888. At Everton he was reserve to Johnny Holt during Everton' first season in League football, the unknown Warmby played only once in the first team on 22 September 1888. Harry Warmby, playing at centre—half, made his League debut on 22 September 1888 at Wellington Road, the then home of Aston Villa FC. Everton were defeated by the home team 2–1. Harry Warmby appeared in one of the 22 League matches played by Everton during the 1888–89 season.
