= John Douglas (footballer) =

English footballer

Personal information
- Date of birth: 13 March 1961 (age 65)
- Place of birth: Stockton-on-Tees, England
- Position: Forward

Senior career*
Years	Team	Apps	(Gls)
- Stockton
1986	Darlington	3	(0)
- * Club domestic league appearances and goals

John S. Douglas (born 13 March 1961) is an English former footballer who played as a forward for Darlington in the Football League.

Douglas was born in Stockton-on-Tees, County Durham. He played non-league football for Stockton before joining Darlington in January 1986. He made his debut on 31 March 1986, in the starting eleven for the visit to Rotherham United in the Third Division; Darlington won 2–1. He played in three more matches in what remained of the 1985–86 season: two league starts and a substitute appearance in the Associate Members' Cup.
