= Jack Keys =

English footballer

Personal information
- Full name: John Keys
- Date of birth: 1866
- Date of death: 1890 (aged 23–24)
- Position: Forward

Senior career*
Years	Team	Apps	(Gls)
1888	Everton	1	(0)
- * Club domestic league appearances and goals

John Keys (1865— 5 March 1890), was an English footballer who played in The Football League for Everton. NOTE: Sources disagree as whether Jack Keys was born in 1865 or 1866. Also only ENFA states he died in 1890. I have used the ENFA dates for his birth but the date maybe wrong. FreeBMD confirms a John Keys died in Liverpool in Quarter 1 of 1890. Jack Keys was injured while playing for Everton Athletic against Wigan Central. He was taken to his mother's home on Vauxhall Road, Liverpool, where he died just a few days later on 5 March 1890. His mother reported that he had been unwell for sometime before the game. He was buried on 9 March in Anfield Cemetery, Liverpool.

Jack Keys was an unknown forward who made just one League appearance for the Blues, taking over as leader of the attack from William Lewis on 22 September 1888. Jack Keys, playing at centre—forward, made his League debut on 22 September 1888 at Wellington Road, the then home of Aston Villa. Everton were defeated by the home team 2–1. Jack Keys appeared in one of the 22 League matches played by Everton during the 1888–89 season.
