= George Fleming (footballer, born 1864) =

Scottish footballer

Personal information
- Full name: George Spink Fleming
- Date of birth: 4 November 1864
- Place of birth: Arbroath, Scotland
- Date of death: 1 April 1912 (aged 47)
- Place of death: Waterloo, Liverpool, England
- Position: Forward

Senior career*
Years	Team	Apps	(Gls)
1887–1888	Everton	4	(2)
- * Club domestic league appearances and goals

George Spink Fleming (4 November 1864 – 1 April 1912) was a Scottish footballer. He was the first player to score for Everton in the Football League, registering twice in a 2–1 win against Accrington on the competition's opening day.

== Career ==
Described as a hard-running forward, able to occupy all five front-line positions, he produced his best form on the right wing.

Starting his football career with local club Arbroath, Fleming set up both goals in the inaugural final of the Forfarshire Cup in December 1883 as Arbroath beat Dundee club Harp by two goals to one, and represented Forfarshire in the annual inter-county fixture versus Fifeshire in 1884.

After moving to Liverpool early in 1885 and finding work as a clerk with the Bank of Liverpool (later Martin's Bank), Fleming made his first appearance for Everton versus Darwen in a 1–1 draw at Anfield on 22 August 1885 and scored his first goal a few weeks later in a 2–3 home defeat against Accrington.

Fleming went on to score 47 goals in 84 games before the Football League era began in 1888, placing him third on Everton's pre-Football League goalscoring charts behind Jack McGill and George Farmer. Fleming was part of the Everton teams which won the Liverpool Senior Cup and the Liverpool Athletic Shield in 1886 and retained the Liverpool Senior Cup in 1887, when he scored twice in the final versus Oakfield Rovers.

George Fleming made his Football League debut on the inaugural day of the competition, 8 September 1888, playing on the right wing, at Anfield, then the home of Everton. The home team defeated the visitors, Accrington 2–1 and Fleming scored both goals; making him scorer of the first Everton goal in the Football League, and the first Everton player to score twice in a single Football League match. Fleming appeared in four of the 22 League matches played by Everton in season 1888–89 and scored two goals, before retiring from playing to focus on his career at the bank.

As documented in the Everton FC minute books, Fleming was a member of the Everton FC management committee during his playing career, presumably utilising his financial expertise, and remained so until stepping down in 1891.

== Later life and death ==
George Spink Fleming married Margaret Speirs Crawford at the Church of St. John, Waterloo in Liverpool on 17 July 1900 and the couple had two sons, one of whom was killed in action while serving with the Royal Air Force over the Netherlands in 1943. Fleming was diagnosed with multiple sclerosis in his 30s, and died from the condition, aged 47, on 1 April 1912. Obituaries were published in the press in Liverpool and Arbroath and he was buried at Anfield Cemetery.
