= William Briscoe (footballer) =

English footballer

Personal information
- Full name: William H. Briscoe
- Date of birth: circa 1864
- Place of birth: Liverpool, England
- Position: Forward

Senior career*
Years	Team	Apps	(Gls)
1886–1888	Everton	69	(25)
- * Club domestic league appearances and goals

William H. Briscoe (circa 1864 – ) was an English footballer who played in The Football League for Everton.

== Early career ==
William Briscoe signed for Everton in August 1886. He appeared in all five forward–line positions for the Blues - scored 25 goals in 66 games during his first two seasons with Everton, appearing in the club's first–ever FA Cup tie against Bolton Wanderers in October 1887.

== Season 1888–89 ==
Briscoe, playing as a forward, made his League debut on 13 October 1888 at Trent Bridge, the then home of Notts County. The home team won 3–1. Briscoe appeared in three of the 22 League matches played by Everton in season 1888–89. However, he failed to establish himself in the side when League football was introduced, making just three appearances, as referred to above. He left Everton in May 1889.
