= David Waugh =

English footballer

Personal information
- Full name: David Waugh
- Date of birth: 1866
- Place of birth: England
- Position: Inside forward

Senior career*
Years	Team	Apps	(Gls)
1886	Padiham		
1887–1888	Burnley		
1888–1889	Everton	7	(2)
- * Club domestic league appearances and goals

David Waugh (born 1866, date of death unknown) was an English professional footballer who played as an inside forward. He played for Padiham before joining nearby Burnley in 1886. He made his competitive debut on 15 October 1887 in the club's 2–0 win against Darwen Old Wanderers in the first round of the FA Cup. He scored in his only other cup appearance for Burnley in the 2–3 loss to Accrington in the next round of the competition. He left Burnley to join Everton in July 1888.

== 1888-1889 Season ==
David Waugh made his League Debut on 8 September 1888, playing as a forward, at Anfield, the then home of Everton. The home team defeated the visitors Accrington 2–1. David Waugh scored his debut League goal on 6 October 1888, playing as a forward, at Anfield. The home team defeated the visitors, Aston Villa 2–0 and David Waugh scored the first of Everton' two goals. David Waugh appeared in seven of the 22 League matches played by Everton in season 1888–89 and scored two League goals.

== 1889 onwards ==
Waugh was not retained for 1889-1890 and nothing is recorded about him after he left Everton.
