= Albert Chadwick (English footballer) =

English footballer (1866–1937)

Personal information
- Date of birth: 1866
- Place of birth: Liverpool, England
- Date of death: 1937 (aged 70–71)

Youth career
- Everton

Senior career*
Years	Team	Apps	(Gls)
1888–1892	Everton	5	(0)
Total		5	(0)
- * Club domestic league appearances and goals

Albert Chadwick (1866 – 1937) was an English professional footballer who played in the Football League.

== League debut ==
Chadwick made his League Debut on 1 December 1888 at Anfield, Liverpool against West Bromwich Albion. Chadwick was at left-back covering Nick Ross who was unavailable to play. Everton made a bright start but did not score and then conceded a goal which changed the game. West Bromwich Albion went on the rampage and got two more before the half finished. Half-time - Everton 0–3 West Bromwich Albion. The second-half started positively for Everton and they got a goal back through Edgar Chadwick, a cousin. However, disaster struck as Frank Sugg had to leave the field of play with an injured right-foot. Matters got worse when with 15 minutes left James Coyne also stopped playing because of an injury. Down to nine men Everton had done well to contain West Bromwich Albion in the second-half but the Albion inevitably capitalised on the extra space and got a fourth goal.

Chadwick played two matches for Everton in the 1888–89 season. He played one at left-back and one at left-half. Everton conceded 6 of their 47 goals for the season when Chadwick played in his two matches. Everton finished eighth in the Football League.
