= Hugh Pollock (footballer) =

Scottish footballer

Personal information
- Full name: Hugh Pollock
- Date of birth: 23 May 1865
- Place of birth: Newmilns, Scotland
- Date of death: 1910 (aged 44–45)
- Position: Wing-half

Senior career*
Years	Team	Apps	(Gls)
1884	Kilmarnock Athletic		
1885	Liverpool Stanley		
1888–1889	Everton	1	(0)
- * Club domestic league appearances and goals

Hugh Pollock (23 May 1865 – 1910) was a Scottish footballer who played for Everton.

Hugh Pollock signed, as a 19-year-old, for Kilmarnock Athletic in 1884. After one year, like many Scottish footballers, he headed South to England and joined Liverpool Stanley in 1885. He spent three years with Liverpool Stanley and then signed for Everton in August 1888.

Hugh Pollock, playing as a wing–half, made his League and Everton debut on 29 September 1888 at Pike's Lane, the then home of Bolton Wanderers. Everton were defeated by the home team 6–2. Hugh Pollock appeared in that one League match and he left Everton in April 1889.

Hugh Pollock died in 1910 aged 34/35.
