= Alex McKinnon (footballer) =

Scottish footballer

Personal information
- Full name: Alexander McKinnon
- Date of birth: 1865
- Place of birth: Edinburgh, Scotland
- Date of death: 1935 (aged 69–70)
- Position: Forward

Senior career*
Years	Team	Apps	(Gls)
1887	Hibernian		
1888	Everton	6	(5)
- * Club domestic league appearances and goals

Alexander McKinnon (1865–1935) was a Scottish footballer who played for Hibernian and Everton.

Alex McKinnon made his League and Club debut on 15 September 1888, playing at centre-half, at Anfield, the then home of Everton. The home team defeated the visitors, Notts County 2–1. Alex McKinnon scored his debut Club and League goal on 20 October 1888, playing as a winger, at County Ground, the then home of Derby County. Everton defeated the home team 4–2 and McKinnon scored the third of Everton' four goals. Alex McKinnon scored his first and only League hat-trick, and the first by an Everton player on 27 October 1888. Playing as a winger at Anfield Alex McKinnon scored the second, fourth, fifth and sixth Everton goals as the home team defeated the visitors, Derby County FC 6–2. Alex McKinnon appeared in six of the 22 League matches played by Everton in season 1888–89 and scored five goals. Four of his five goals came in one match. As a winger (five appearances) he played in the Everton midfield when it achieved a big (three–League–goals–or–more) once. Playing as a centre-half (one appearance) he played in the Everton defence when they restricted the opposition to one–League–goal–in–a–match once.

McKinnon left the club suddenly in November/December 1888. No reason was given. He died in 1935 aged c. 70.
