= Dick Molyneux =

English football manager (1858–1906)

Richard Molyneux
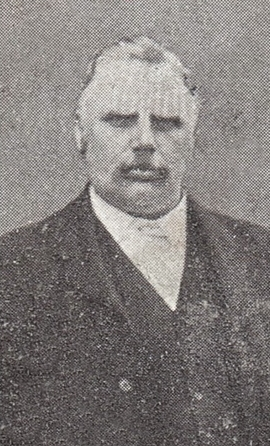
- Molyneux while with Brentford in 1903

Personal information
- Full name: Richard Molyneux
- Date of birth: January 1858
- Place of birth: Prescot, England
- Date of death: 5 June 1906 (aged 48)
- Place of death: West Derby, England

Managerial career
- Years: Team
- 1889–1901: Everton
- 1903–1906: Brentford

Richard Molyneux (January 1858 – 5 June 1906) was an English football manager. He managed in nearly 400 games in the Football League with Everton from 1889 to 1901 and later managed Brentford.

== Managerial career ==
=== Everton ===
Molyneux joined Everton in 1878, when the club was founded as St. Domingo FC. He became Everton secretary-manager on 23 August 1889. His Toffees team finished as runners-up in the Football League in the 1889–90 season and won the Liverpool Senior Cup. Everton went one better in the 1890–91 season, winning the Football League and retaining the Liverpool Senior Cup. In 1892, Molyneux was one of the instigators behind the club's move across Stanley Park from Anfield to Goodison Park. Despite dominating the Liverpool Senior Cup throughout the 1890s, Everton failed to win any further major silverware during Molyneux's tenure and finished as runners-up in the Football League First Division in 1894–95 and were FA Cup finalists in 1892–93 and 1896–97. Everton also twice won the Lancashire Senior Cup under Molyneux, in 1894 and 1897. Molyneux's tenure came to an end on 11 September 1901, when he was suspended by the board of directors for suspected drunkenness.

=== Brentford ===
Molyneux became manager of Southern League First Division club Brentford in 1903. Later in the year, Molyneux was suspended from football until the end of the 1903–04 season for attempting to buy goalkeeper John Bishop out of the Scots Guards. Molyneux managed the club to mid-table mediocrity in the following two seasons, with the club's best position being 9th in 1905–06. During Molyneux's reign and due to his nous, Brentford moved from Boston Park cricket ground to a ground of their own in 1904. Serious illness (described as "paralysis") saw Molyneux replaced temporarily by trainer Bob Crone and then secretary William Brown until the end of the 1905–06 season, at the end of which his contract was terminated. He returned to Liverpool in June 1906 to be with his wife Anne and died a few days after arriving home.

== Administrative career ==
Molyneux was a member of the Football League Management Committee from 1893 to 1899.

== Managerial statistics ==
Team	From	To	Record					Ref
Team	From	To	G	W	D	L	Win %	Ref
Everton	23 August 1889	11 September 1901	386	194	64	128	50.26	
Brentford	May 1903	February 1906	102	33	25	44	32.35	
Total			488	227	89	172	46.52	

== Honours ==
Everton

- Football League First Division (1): 1890–91
- Liverpool Senior Cup (9): 1890, 1891, 1892, 1894, 1895, 1896, 1898, 1899, 1900
- Lancashire Senior Cup (2): 1894, 1897

== See also ==
- List of English football championship winning managers
