= Alex Lochhead =

Scottish footballer (1863–1939)

Personal information
- Date of birth: 27 June 1863
- Place of birth: Neilston, Renfrewshire, Scotland
- Date of death: 9 January 1939 (aged 75)
- Place of death: Paisley, Renfrewshire, Scotland
- Position: Left half

Senior career*
Years	Team	Apps	(Gls)
- Arthurlie
1888–1891	Third Lanark	4	(0)
- Morton
1891–1892	Everton	6	(0)
1892–1893	Third Lanark	9	(0)
- Clyde

International career
1889	Scotland	1	(0)
- * Club domestic league appearances and goals

Alexander Lochhead (27 June 1863 – 9 January 1939) was a Scottish footballer who played as a left half.

== Career ==
Lochhead started his career with Neilston Victoria and played club football for Third Lanark, Morton, Everton and Clyde, and made one appearance for Scotland in 1889. He won the Scottish Cup with Third Lanark in 1889. For Everton, he made six appearances in the Football League between March and November 1891.
