= Jimmy Jamieson =

Scottish footballer

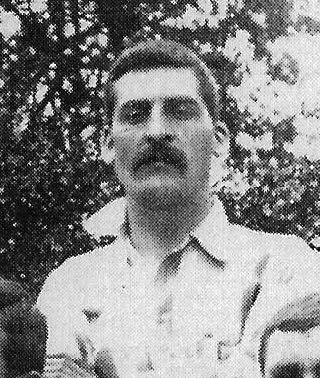

Personal information
- Full name: James Jamieson
- Date of birth: 3 November 1867
- Place of birth: Lockerbie, Scotland
- Position: Left half

Senior career*
| Years | Team | Apps | (Gls) |
| 1890–1892 | Cambuslang | 35 | (0) |
| 1892–1893 | Everton | 14 | (0) |
| 1893–1899 | The Wednesday | 124 | (3) |
| Total | | 173 | (3) |
- * Club domestic league appearances and goals

James Jamieson (3 November 1867–unknown) was a Scottish footballer who played in the Football League for Everton and The Wednesday. He was a strong signing for Wednesday, being a regular there for five seasons and a reserve in a sixth; he played four times in the club's run to the 1896 FA Cup Final, but did not take part in the match itself, which they won. He had begun his career in Scotland with Cambuslang.

== See also ==
- List of Sheffield Wednesday F.C. players
