= Robert Jones (footballer, born 1868) =

Welsh footballer

Personal information
- Full name: Robert Samuel Jones
- Date of birth: Q3 1868
- Place of birth: Wrexham, Wales
- Date of death: 25 May 1939
- Position: Defender

Senior career*
Years	Team	Apps	(Gls)
1887	Wrexham Grosvenor		
1887–1894	Everton	7	(1)
1894–1895	Ardwick	18	(0)
1895	South Shore	?	

International career
1894	Wales	1	(0)
- * Club domestic league appearances and goals as of 11:17, 8 July 2009 (UTC)

Robert Samuel Jones (1868–1939) was a Welsh footballer who played as a full back. He gained one international cap for Wales in 1894.

He joined Everton in December 1887. He was described as a burly, reliable reserve player in one source. Robert Jones made his League debut on 8 September 1888, playing at centre-half, at Anfield, the then home of Everton. The home team defeated the visitors Accrington 2–1. Robert Jones appeared in only one of the 22 League matches played by Everton in season 1888–89. Playing as a centre-half (one appearance) he played in the Everton defence when they restricted the opposition to one–League–goal–in–a–match once.

Robert Jones played 7 League games for Everton, before moving to Ardwick (who later became Manchester City) in the 1890s, and he played 18 League games for them.
