= Robert Watson (footballer) =

English footballer

Personal information
- Date of birth: circa 1866
- Place of birth: Liverpool England
- Position: Forward

Senior career*
Years	Team	Apps	(Gls)
1887–1889	Everton	18	(5)
1889	Gorton Villa		
- * Club domestic league appearances and goals

Robert Watson (1866 – after 1889) was an English footballer who played in the Football League for Everton.

Robert Watson was born in Liverpool in 1866. Signed by Everton in August 1887 he scored ten goals in 14 games in his first season with the club. Watson had made his club debut as an inside—forward in a first—round FA Cup tie against Bolton Wanderers in October 1887. Robert Watson, playing as a winger, made his League debut on 22 September 1888 at Wellington Road, the then home of Aston Villa. Everton were defeated by the home team 2—1 and Watson scored the solitary Everton goal. Robert Watson appeared in 18 of the 22 League matches played by Everton during the 1888–89 season and scored five goals. As a forward (15 appearances) he played in a forward line that scored three–League–goals–or–more on three separate occasions.

Watson was a sprightly forward, with good control, he was then switched to inside—right and had a sound first season of League action before losing his place to Welsh International Charlie Parry. He moved in 1889 to Gorton Villa.
