= Mike Higgins (footballer) =

English footballer

Personal information
- Date of birth: Q4 1862
- Position: Wing-half

Senior career*
Years	Team	Apps	(Gls)
1880–1889	Everton	1	(0)
- * Club domestic league appearances and goals

Michael Higgins (born Q4 1862) was an English footballer who played in The Football League for Everton.

== Career ==
Higgins signed for Everton in July 1880. He made his club debut in October 1880 against Darwen and was a Liverpool Cup winner in 1884, 1886 and 1887. Higgins also played in Everton's first-ever FA Cup tie in October 1887. Note: Matthews book describes his first name as Marcus. Other sources and FreeBMD web–site confirm the first name as Michael.

Mike Higgins, playing as a wing—half, made his League debut on 22 September 1888 at Wellington Road, the then home of Aston Villa. Everton were defeated by the home team 2–1. Mike Higgins appeared in one of the 22 League matches played by Everton during the 1888–89 season.

Mike Higgins was a long—serving half—back, who appeared in 178 matches (one League match) and scored 36 goals while occupying eight different positions during his time with Everton. Mike Higgins later became a publican who also posted telegram reports of other League games.
