= Daniel Kirkwood (footballer, born 1867) =

Scottish footballer, director, and chairman

Personal information
- Date of birth: 28 May 1867
- Place of birth: Linlithgow, Edinburgh, Scotland
- Date of death: 23 December 1928 (aged 61)
- Position: Half-back

Senior career*
Years	Team	Apps	(Gls)
1889–1892	Everton	36	(2)
- * Club domestic league appearances and goals

Daniel Kirkwood (28 May 1867 - 23 December 1928) was a Scottish football player, director, and chairman of Everton.
