= Robert Smalley =

English footballer (1867–1947)

Personal information
- Full name: Robert Edwin Smalley
- Date of birth: 1867
- Place of birth: Darwen, England
- Date of death: 1947 (aged 79–80)
- Position: Goalkeeper

Senior career*
Years	Team	Apps	(Gls)
1886–1887	Preston North End		
1887–1890	Everton	36	(0)
- * Club domestic league appearances and goals

Robert Edwin Smalley (1867–1947) was an English footballer who played in the Football League for Everton.

== Early career ==
Robert Smalley was signed by Preston North End in 1886. In the following year, May 1887, he moved to Everton and took over as first goalkeeper from Charles Jolliffe. He made his Everton debut in October 1887 against Notts County. Smalley played 30 matches before the Football League was created in September 1888. He was described as an agile goalkeeper and was Everton' number one for the next two seasons.

== 1888–89 season ==
Smalley made his League debut on 8 September 1888 at Anfield, then home of Everton. The home team defeated the visitors, Accrington, 2–1. Smalley appeared in 18 of the 22 League games played by Everton in 1888–89. As a goalkeeper, he played in an Everton defence that kept two clean sheets or restricted the opposition to one–League–goal–in–a–match on five occasions.

== 1889 onwards ==
Smalley was retained for 1889–90 and played 17 matches. His last season, 1890–91, he only played once. After his footballing career he became an accountant and went back to Preston.
