= David Jardine (footballer) =

Scottish footballer

Personal information
- Date of birth: 3 November 1867
- Place of birth: Lockerbie, Scotland

Senior career*
| Years | Team | Apps | (Gls) |
| –1890 | Bootle | | |
| 1890–1894 | Everton | 37 | (0) |
| 1894–1896 | Nelson | | |
| 1896–1902 | Wrexham | 9 | (0) |
- * Club domestic league appearances and goals as of 5 May 2014 ‡ National team caps and goals as of 8 September 2014

David Jardine (born 3 November 1867) was a Scottish footballer. He played for English clubs Bootle, Nelson, and Everton, with whom he won the Football League in 1890-91. He also played for Welsh club Wrexham

== Sources ==
- Profile on evertonfc.com
- Profile on wrexhamafcarchive.co.uk
