= Hope Robertson =

Scottish footballer

Personal information
- Full name: Hope Ramsey Robertson
- Date of birth: 17 January 1868
- Place of birth: Whiteinch, Scotland
- Date of death: 27 September 1947 (aged 79)
- Place of death: Goole, England
- Positions: Midfielder; right back

Senior career*
Years	Team	Apps	(Gls)
1888-1890	Morton		
- Minerva
1889–1890	Partick Thistle	3	(0)
1889–1890	Woolwich Arsenal	4	(4)
1890–1892	Everton	32	(1)
1892	Bootle	10	(1)
1893–1894	Partick Thistle	29	(2)
1894	Walsall Town Swifts	12	(0)
- * Club domestic league appearances and goals

Hope Ramsey Robertson (17 January 1868 – 27 September 1927) was a Scottish footballer who played in the English Football League for Bootle, Everton and Walsall Town Swifts, and in the Scottish Football League for Partick Thistle. He played in the first ever competitive match at Goodison Park in front of 14,000 spectators, a short time before leaving Everton.
