= George Dobson (footballer, born 1862) =

English footballer

Personal information
- Date of birth: April 1862
- Place of birth: Bolton, Lancashire, England
- Date of death: 16 October 1941 (aged 79)
- Place of death: Liscard, Wallasey, England
- Position: Full back

Senior career*
Years	Team	Apps	(Gls)
1884–1885	Bolton Wanderers		
1885–1889	Everton	18	(0)
- * Club domestic league appearances and goals

George Dobson (1862–1941) was an English footballer who played for Bolton Wanderers and then before and at the start of the Football League for Everton. He was one of the club's first professional players.

== Early career ==
George Dobson was signed by his local club, Bolton Wanderers in 1884. In the March of following year, 1885, he moved to Everton. He played 130 matches before the Football League started in September 1888. He was described as well built, strong and a clean kicker. He made right-back his own position in the 1888–1889 season until injury finished his career in 1889.

== 1888–1889 season ==
George Dobson made his League debut on 8 September 1888, as a wing-half, at Anfield, the then home of Everton. The home team defeated the visitors, Accrington 2–1. George Dobson appeared in 18 of the 22 League matches played by Everton in season 1888–89. As a full-back he played in an Everton defence that achieved one clean-sheet and restricted the opposition to one–League–goal–in–a–match on four occasions.

== End of Career ==
George Dobson was not retained as he had an injury that prevented him from continuing as a footballer. He died in Wallasey, Cheshire on 16 October 1941, aged 79.
