= George Farmer (Welsh footballer) =

Welsh footballer (1862–1905)

Personal information
- Date of birth: 13 December 1862
- Place of birth: Oswestry, England
- Date of death: 4 May 1905 (aged 42)
- Place of death: Liverpool, England
- Position: Half back

Senior career*
Years	Team	Apps	(Gls)
1880–1882	Oswestry White Star F.C.		
1882–1885	Oswestry		
1885–1890	Everton	31	(1)
1891-92	West Manchester F.C.		
1892-93	Liverpool Caledonians		
1893-1897	Liverpool South End F.C.		
1897	Rock Ferry F.C.		

International career
1885	Wales	2	(0)
- * Club domestic league appearances and goals

George Farmer (13 December 1862 – 4 May 1905) was a Welsh footballer who played in the Football League for Everton. On signing from Oswestry F.C. (not to be confused with the later Oswestry Town club) he became Everton's first professional player alongside George Dobson. Farmer later became the first professional player to score in a recognised competitive match for the club, a 2–2 draw in an FA Cup first-round replay against Bolton Wanderers on 29 October 1887, after teammate Robert Watson, an amateur player, had opened the scoring.

== Early career ==
Farmer was a skinner by trade. He joined a local club, Oswestry White Star, known as 'The Skinners' in 1880. Oswestry White Star merged with rival club Oswestry in 1882, and in 1884 Farmer helped them win the Welsh Cup. He was awarded two caps by Wales in 1885 (against England and Scotland) shortly before joining Everton. Farmer made his Everton debut in March 1885 against Crewe Alexandra at Anfield and had a goal disallowed in a 3–0 win. In the 1885–86 season he scored 34 goals from 41 games and played in six different positions, though primarily as an inside-left. Farmer scored 23 goals in the 1886–87 season and 15 goals in 1887–88. In the pre-Football League era he played 134 times for Everton scoring 81 goals. Farmer was 5'6" tall, he was a clever, constructive player, noted as a 'fine passer' who was capable of 'beautiful work'. He was also adept with in-swinging corner-kicks.

== 1888–89 season ==
Farmer made his Football League debut on 8 September 1888, playing as a winger, at Anfield, then home of Everton. The home team defeated the visitors Accrington 2–1. Farmer scored his first and only League goal on 6 October 1888 in a 2–0 home win versus Aston Villa. Farmer appeared in 21 of the 22 League matches that season, playing primarily in a more defensive wing-half role.

== End of career ==
Farmer played more as a reserve player in 1889–90 but did make ten League appearances. He left Everton in 1891 and played for a number of non-League clubs before retiring as a player. He died in Liverpool on 4 May 1905 at the age of 42 having suffered from heart disease.
