= Alex Latta =

Scottish footballer

Personal information
- Date of birth: 1 September 1867
- Place of birth: Dumbarton, Scotland
- Date of death: 25 August 1928 (aged 60)
- Position: Forward

Senior career*
| Years | Team | Apps | (Gls) |
| 1881–1889 | Dumbarton Athletic | 0 | (0) |
| 1889–1895 | Everton | 148 | (70) |
| 1895–1896 | Liverpool | 0 | (0) |

International career
| 1888–1889 | Scotland | 2 | (2) |
- * Club domestic league appearances and goals

Alexander Latta (1 September 1867 – 25 August 1928) was a Scottish footballer who made ten appearances, mostly at outside right, in Everton's Football League title-winning side of 1890–91. Latta began his career with Dumbarton Athletic as a 14-year-old but moved to Everton in 1889. He was a tall and stocky outside right who displayed great pace and dribbling skills.

Latta played twice for Scotland during his career. His debut came in the 5–1 defeat of Wales on 10 March 1888, in which he scored twice; he was the only serving player from Dumbarton Athletic (not to be confused with Dumbarton) to have been selected for international duty.
