= James Costley =

English footballer

Personal information
- Date of birth: 1862
- Place of birth: Liverpool, England
- Date of death: 1931 (aged 68–69)
- Position: Forward

Senior career*
Years	Team	Apps	(Gls)
1879–1886	Blackburn Olympic		
1886–1889	Everton	6	(3)
- * Club domestic league appearances and goals

James Costley (Q1 1862 – Q1 1931) was an English footballer who played in the Football League for Everton.

James Costley, although from Merseyside, signed for Blackburn Olympic in 1879. Blackburn Olympic never played League Football and majored on the FA Cup. Their two successful seasons (and Costley was involved) were 1882–83 and 1883–84. In 1882–83 Blackburn Olympic reached the Final. The date was 31 March 1883 and the venue was Kennington Oval. Blackburn Olympic played the FA Cup holders, Old Etonians and beat them 2–1, Costley scoring Olympic's second and winning goal. Costley played as an inside forward. The following season, 1883–84, Olympic, as holders, took the defence of the Cup to the semi–final. The match was played at Trent Bridge on 1 March 1884 against Queen's Park (Glasgow). Olympic were hoping to win and play their local rivals, Blackburn Rovers who played in, and won, the other semi–final. However, Olympic were outclassed by their Scottish opponents and lost 4–0. Costley was signed by Everton from Blackburn Olympic in 1886 and was described as a skilful winger and superb dribbler. He did very well in his first two seasons scoring 22 goals from 59 appearances. However, once League football arrived at Anfield he could no longer hold a regular place in the team.

Costley made his League debut, playing as a winger at County Ground on 20 October 1888, the then home of Derby County. The visitors won 4–2 and Costley, on his League debut scored both Everton's opening goals to put his team 2–0 ahead before half–time. Costley appeared in six of the 22 league matches played by Everton in the 1888–89 season and scored three goals.

Costley was released by Everton in May 1889. He died during the first quarter of 1931 in Blackburn aged 68/69.
