= Alf Milward =

English footballer (1870–1941)

Personal information
- Full name: Alfred Milward
- Date of birth: 12 September 1870
- Place of birth: Great Marlow, Buckinghamshire, England
- Date of death: 1 June 1941 (aged 70)
- Place of death: Winchester, England
- Height: 5 ft 7 in (1.70 m)
- Position: Left winger

Senior career*
Years	Team	Apps	(Gls)
- Old Borlasians
1886–1888	Marlow		
1888–1897	Everton	201	(84)
1897–1899	New Brighton Tower	32	(19)
1899–1901	Southampton	56	(35)
1901–1903	New Brompton		
1903–1905	Southampton Cambridge		

International career
1891–1897	England	4	(3)
- * Club domestic league appearances and goals

Alfred Milward (12 September 1870 – 1 June 1941) was a professional footballer who played in the 1893 and 1897 FA Cup Finals for Everton and in the 1900 FA Cup Final for Southampton.

== Early career ==
Born in Great Marlow, Milward was one of the first Southerners to establish himself in the Football League. The son of a tradesman, he was educated at Sir William Borlase's Grammar School and played for the school's Old Boys team and for Marlow, before joining Everton in May 1888.

He played as a winger, known to contest almost every ball, while playing at full stretch for the duration of each game. He had a knack for delivering cross-field passes from up to 40 yards, combined with his shooting power from wide positions.

== Everton ==
=== League debut ===
Milward made his league debut as centre-forward at Leamington Road against Blackburn Rovers on 10 November 1888. Both teams had uniforms of similar colours: blue and white, but Rovers allowed Everton to wear their normal colours and came out in red and black jerseys. The match started at a frantic pace but neither side was particularly threatened. However, at one point Everton's right side struggled to cope with the Rovers' attack and Rovers exploited this to score. At half-time the score was 1–0 to Blackburn Rovers. In the second half, Everton had the sun behind them and started more aggressively. Everton's goalkeeper Robert Smalley had to make a good save to prevent Rovers scoring, but with the wind at their backs, Everton's play became flat and Rovers took full advantage scoring twice more, with the match finishing 3–0 to Blackburn Rovers.

=== 1888–89 season ===
After their defeat at Blackburn in Milward's debut game, he was left out from 17 November until 29 December 1888. The new year of 1889 saw Milward back in favour, and he was picked to play at outside-left in the home match against Stoke City Potters where he scored his first League goal in a 2–1 win. Robert Watson made the pass and Milward shot past the Potters' keeper. The following week Preston North End were the visitors and Milward made his second appearance at centre-forward. From 19 January to 9 February, he played three consecutive games, all at centre-forward. He missed the visit to West Bromwich Albion but returned at centre-forward for the final game of the season, a 3–1 home win over Blackburn Rovers. He scored his second goal in that match.

Milward played six matches for Everton where he scored two of his team's six goals. The team's 35 total goals scored that season was the second lowest tally by any League club. Everton finished eighth.

== Later career ==
He quickly established himself and forced his way into the England squad, being one of five Everton players in the national team to play against Scotland in 1891. By this time Milward was noted as a hard-working outside-left at Everton and had forged a great partnership with Edgar Chadwick. Milward scored 11 goals in 22 games when Everton won the Football League title in 1890–91 and also won two FA Cup Runners-up medals before leaving Everton in 1897 and joining the newly formed New Brighton Tower club.

In 1899 Milward was enticed south to join an impressive-looking Southampton team who, despite being in the Southern League, boasted a star-studded side of experienced ex-internationals and former top flight players. With Milward in the side they surged past three top flight clubs in 1900 to reach the cup final, with Milward himself netting a brace to humiliate his former Everton colleagues in the first round.

On the day of the match, in-fighting between the English and Scottish players over the selection of one of the forwards caused a rift in the team that was evident in their easy defeat.

Milward died in Winchester on 1 June 1941.

== Honours ==
Everton

- Football League championship: 1890–91
- FA Cup finalist: 1893 and 1897

Southampton

- FA Cup finalist: 1900
- Southern League championship: 1900–01

== Sources ==
- Alf Milward at Englandstats.com
- Gary Chalk & Duncan Holley (1987). Saints - A complete record. Breedon Books. ISBN 0-907969-22-4.
- Duncan Holley & Gary Chalk (1992). The Alphabet of the Saints. ACL & Polar Publishing. ISBN 0-9514862-3-3.
- Michael Joyce (2004). Football League Players' Records 1888-1939. SoccerData. ISBN 1-899468-67-6.
