= Johnny Holt =

English footballer (1865–1937)

Personal information
- Date of birth: 10 April 1865
- Place of birth: Church, Lancashire, England
- Date of death: 1937 (aged 72)
- Positions: Half-back; centre-half

Senior career*
| Years | Team | Apps | (Gls) |
- King's Own Blackburn
| 1886 | Blackpool St. John's | | |
- Church
- Blackpool
| 1887–1888 | Bootle | | |
| 1888–1898 | Everton | 225 | (3) |
| 1898 | Reading | | |

International career
| 1890–1900 | England | 10 | (0) |
- * Club domestic league appearances and goals

Johnny Holt (10 April 1865 – 1937) was an English professional footballer who played in twenty-one of Everton's twenty-two game Football League title winning side of 1890–91.

== Career ==
=== Early career ===
Holt played for a number of clubs before signing for Everton in August 1888. His first club was called King's Own Blackburn, then he joined Blackpool St. John's in 1886, a club that pre-dated Blackpool but ceased to exist as the latter became the major club for the town. He then played for his hometown club of Church before returning to Blackpool to play for Blackpool F.C. He then went to Merseyside where, in football terms, he stayed and became a local favourite. He joined Bootle in 1887 and that must be where Everton discovered him as he signed for Everton to play in their inaugural Football League season in August 1888. Holt was a relatively small man at 5 ft 5in, but he was considered to be one of the best centre-halves in the United Kingdom during the 1890s, as well as being a character in the game of football. He was a pocket dynamo with boundless energy, he could outjump the tallest opponent but was a temperamental player, known for his petty and crafty fouls performed on the blind side of the referee. His nickname, a bit of a mouthful, was "Little Everton Devil".

=== 1888–1889 season ===
Holt made his League debut on 8 September 1888, as a wing-half, at Anfield, the then home of Everton. The home team defeated the visitors, Accrington 2–1. He played in 17 of the 22 League matches played by Everton in season 1888–89. As a centre-half (13 appearances) he played in an Everton defence that achieved a clean sheet on two occasions and restricted the opposition to one–League–goal–in–a–match on four separate occasions.

=== Rest of career ===
In March 1890 Holt became the first Everton player to win an England cap when he was picked to play against Wales. Holt joined Reading in 1897. He played 208 times for Everton after 1888–89, scoring three goals. He also made 28 appearances in the FA Cup scoring 1 goal.
