= Edgar Chadwick =

English footballer and manager (1869–1942)

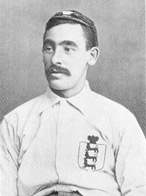

Personal information
- Full name: Edgar Wallace Chadwick
- Date of birth: 14 June 1869
- Place of birth: Blackburn, England
- Date of death: 14 February 1942 (aged 72)
- Place of death: Blackburn, England
- Height: 5 ft 6 in (1.68 m)
- Position: Inside left

Youth career
- 1884–1886: Little Dots F.C.

Senior career*
Years	Team	Apps	(Gls)
1886–1887	Blackburn Olympic	0	(0)
1887–1888	Blackburn Rovers	0	(0)
1888–1899	Everton	270	(97)
1899–1900	Burnley	31	(10)
1900–1902	Southampton	52	(18)
1902–1904	Liverpool	43	(7)
1904–1905	Blackpool	34	(8)
1905–1906	Glossop North End	35	(5)
1906–1908	Darwen		
Total		465	(145)

International career
1891–1897	England	7	(3)

Managerial career
- 1908–1913: Netherlands
- HVV
- HFC
- 1915: Sparta Rotterdam
- * Club domestic league appearances and goals

Edgar Wallace Chadwick (14 June 1869 – 14 February 1942) was a left-sided footballer who had a long and distinguished career with Everton during the 1890s. He was also the national coach for the Netherlands from 1908 to 1913.

His cousin, Arthur Chadwick, also played for England and Southampton, while another cousin, Albert Chadwick, played for Everton.

== Playing career ==
=== Early career ===
Born in Blackburn, he started his career at 15 with Little Dots FC, before signing as a professional with Blackburn Olympic in 1886. After one season at Olympic, he then joined Blackburn Rovers where he spent the 1887–88 season before signing for Everton in July 1888.

=== Everton ===
==== 1888–89 ====
Described by one source as one of the best known players of his day, 5 ft 6 in tall, he was a master strategist and dribbler with the ball.

Chadwick signed for Everton on 1 July 1888 and made his club and league debut on 8 September 1888, playing as a forward, at Anfield, the then home of Everton. The home team defeated the visitors Accrington 2–1. When he played as a forward against Accrington on 8 September 1888, Chadwick was 19 years 86 days old; which made him, on that first weekend of league football, Everton's youngest player. Chadwick scored his debut club and league goal on 15 September 1888, playing as a forward, at Anfield. The visitors were Notts County and the home team won 2–1 with Chadwick scoring the first of Everton's two goals. Chadwick appeared in all the 22 League matches played by Everton in the 1888–89 season and was the only player to achieve 22 matches in that first season. Chadwick also top scored for Everton with six League goals. Chadwick played in a forward line that scored three–League–goals–or–more on four separate occasions.

==== 1889 onwards ====
He was an ever-present in Everton's first two years as a Football League team. In 1889–90 Everton finished runners-up, with Chadwick contributing nine goals. He scored in five of the 14 League Games Everton won that season. In the following season, 1890–91, Everton won the League Championship with Chadwick contributing ten goals and assisting fellow forwards Fred Geary and Alf Milward to score 20 and 12, respectively, as Everton were also the top scorers with a total of 63 goals from 22 games.

Chadwick was nicknamed "Hooky", as his frequent trick was to run with the ball parallel with the goal line, drawing the goalkeeper in the direction of the post, before hooking the ball into the opposite corner of the net.

In 1893, Everton reached the final of the FA Cup, played at Fallowfield Stadium in Manchester, where they were defeated 1–0 by Wolverhampton Wanderers.

Over the next few seasons, Everton continued to be a major force in the Football League, coming runner-up in 1894–95 and reaching another Cup final in 1897 played at Crystal Palace where again they were defeated, this time by Aston Villa, 3–2.

Chadwick spent two further seasons at Everton before joining Burnley in May 1899.

In all, he spent eleven years with Everton, making 270 league appearances, plus a further 30 in the FA Cup, contributing 97 league and 13 cup goals. His goals tally ranks him eighth in the all-time list of Everton goal-scorers and makes him the earliest of Everton's football "legends".

=== England ===
Chadwick's contribution to Everton's League winning team was recognised by a call up to the England team (alongside Alf Milward) for the British Home Championship match against Wales on 7 March 1891. England were comfortable 4–1 winners with Chadwick and Milward claiming a goal each. Chadwick went on to make a total of seven appearances for England, scoring 3 goals.

=== Later career ===
His season at Burnley was not a great success, and although Chadwick was the team's top scorer, with ten goals, he could not prevent them being relegated to the Second Division. In a match against Glossop North End in December 1899, Chadwick scored all three goals in a 3–1 victory.

In August 1900 he moved to Southern League Southampton, where he was re-united with his former Everton left-wing colleague Alf Milward. Chadwick and Milward's partnership contributed 26 goals (14 and 12, respectively) as Southampton once again took the Southern League championship. In the following season, Southampton reached the FA Cup final, which they lost in a replay to Sheffield United.

In May 1902 he sought fresh fields, but as Burnley still held his Football League registration he had to pay them £35 to release him to join Liverpool, where he stayed for two seasons before moving on to Blackpool in 1904. He was an ever-present for Blackpool in his one season with the club, and was also the club's top scorer with eight goals.

He then played out his career with a season at Glossop North End before dropping out of the league to join Darwen where his long career finally ended in 1908 aged 39.

== Coaching career ==
After hanging up his boots in 1908, he moved to the continent where he coached in Germany before moving to the Netherlands where he coached various club sides including The Hague and Haarlem sides.

In 1908, Chadwick was approached to become coach of the Netherlands national team. The experts are in disagreement as to whether Chadwick, or his predecessor Cees van Hasselt, should be considered as the first manager of the Netherlands national team.

Chadwick was appointed manager of the Netherlands to prepare the team for the 1908 Summer Olympics held in London. As Hungary had pulled out of the tournament, the Netherlands had a bye into the semi-finals, where they met Great Britain. This match ended in a 4–0 defeat (with all four goals coming from Harold Stapley, who later spent six seasons with Glossop North End); and the Netherlands then played Sweden for the bronze medal, winning 2–0, as a result of which the Dutch gained their first international success.

Chadwick managed the Netherlands national team for 24 games (generally friendlies against Belgium), winning 14. In 1909 they met the England amateur side and were defeated 9–1 (with six goals from Vivian Woodward, who was an amateur who spent six seasons with Chelsea), but against Belgium, Germany and Sweden they avoided defeat.

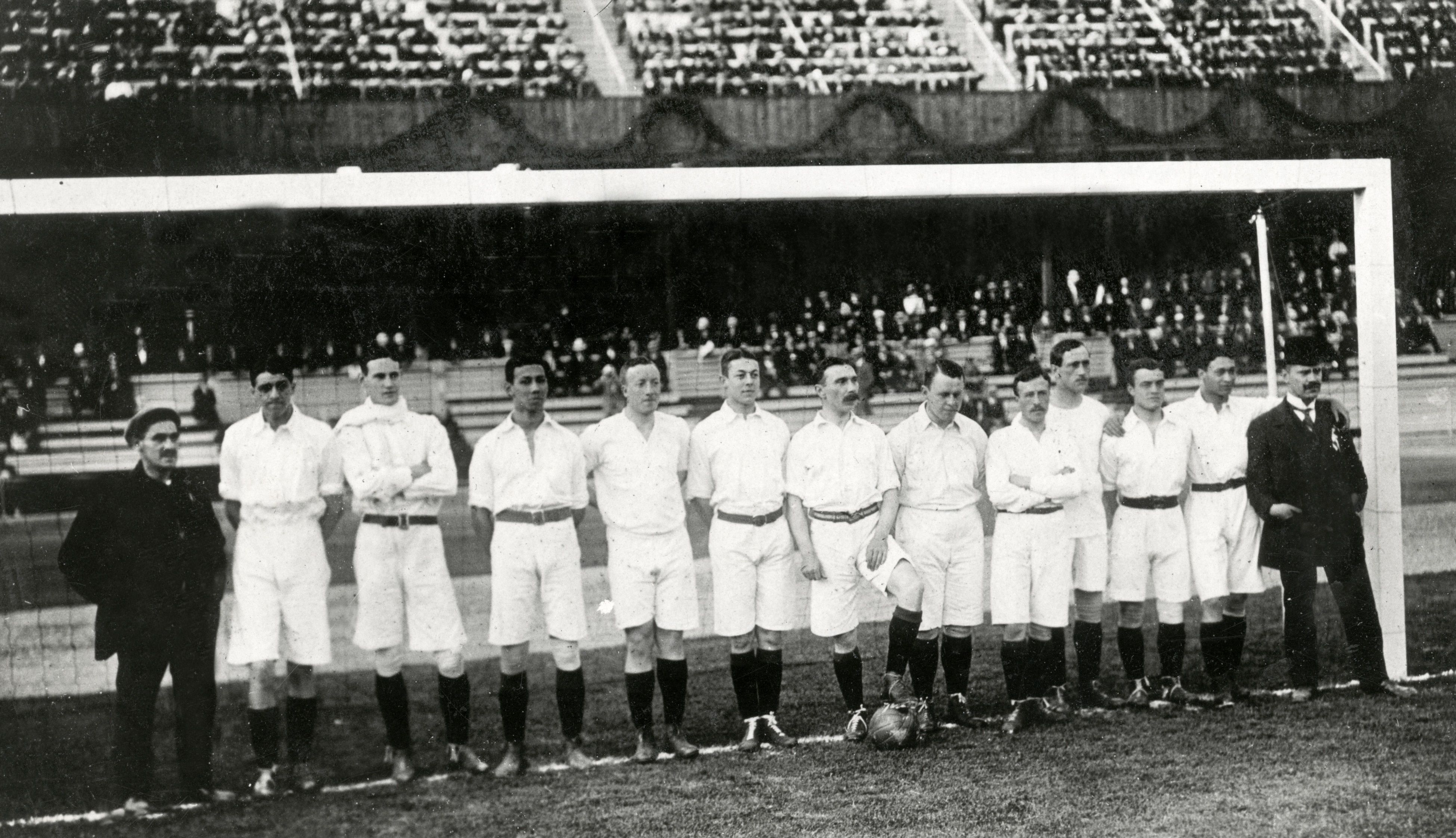
Chadwick (left) with the Netherlands national team during the 1912 Olympics

During the 1912 Summer Olympics held in Stockholm (where eleven teams participated in the football tournament, against only six in 1908) the Dutch defeated Sweden and Austria, but lost in the semi-final 4–1 to Denmark. In the play-off for the bronze medal Finland were crushed 9–0 with Jan Vos scoring five goals.

The greatest success of Chadwick's career as Dutch manager came on 24 March 1913, in a friendly against the English amateurs, which resulted in a 2–1 victory. Both Dutch goals came from Huug de Groot. After the match Vivian Woodward generously conceded: "The best team won."

Chadwick led the Netherlands national team again, in November 1913, when the English gained their revenge with a 2–1 victory.

He was also the coach of Sparta Rotterdam, with whom he won the 1915 Netherlands championship.

After World War I, he returned to Blackburn and reverted to his original trade as a baker. In December 1923, he applied for the manager's job at Blackpool, but after being on a short-list of two, he lost out to Frank Buckley.

== Honours ==
=== As a player ===
Everton

- Football League champions: 1890–91
- FA Cup finalist: 1893 and 1897

Southampton

- FA Cup finalist: 1902
- Southern League championships: 1900–01

=== As a manager ===
Netherlands

- Olympic Games – Bronze medal: 1908 & 1912

Sparta Rotterdam

- Dutch Championship: 1915
- Dutch Western Division: 1915

== Managerial statistics ==
Team	Nat	From	To	Record							
Team	Nat	From	To	G	W	L	D	Win %	F	A	Goal +/-
Netherlands	(Netherlands)	22 October 1908	15 November 1913	24	14	8	2	58.33	71	57	+14
