= Founding Fathers of Merseyside Football =

Series of oil paintings

- Artist: Wasan Suttikasem
- Medium: oil paint
- Location: United Kingdom

The Founding Fathers of Merseyside Football is a series of oil paintings which celebrate the contributions of the men who kick-started and shaped the game in the nineteenth century.

== Background ==
The artwork came about after the discovery of a Sepia tone photograph of Ben Chambers in a long-lost album containing those of the Methodist ministers who had served the St Domingo congregation. On behalf of the Everton Shareholders' Association, David France commissioned Wasan Suttikasem to produce a formal portrait of Rev Chambers and subsequently added the other individuals who influenced the direction of Merseyside football.

The six pioneers are Rev Ben Chambers, John Houlding, Dr James Baxter, George Mahon, John McKenna and Will Cuff, none of whom ever kicked a competitive football.

The six paintings will be exhibited together and rotated around different venues on Merseyside and beyond to promote stronger links between the two clubs.

== Pen Pictures ==
=== The Godfather of Merseyside Football ===
Ben Swift Chambers (1845–1901) By 1877, Rev Chambers' career in the Methodist ministry brought him to the New Connexion Chapel in Liverpool. Once settled at St Domingo's he became an avid supporter of the Band of Hope movement, a temperance organisation for working-class youngsters, and formed a cricket club to provide local youngsters with healthy exercise as well as the opportunity to develop the qualities of Christian sportsmanship. To that end Chambers persuaded the members of Young Men's Bible Class to start St Domingo Football Club in 1878.

=== King John of Everton ===
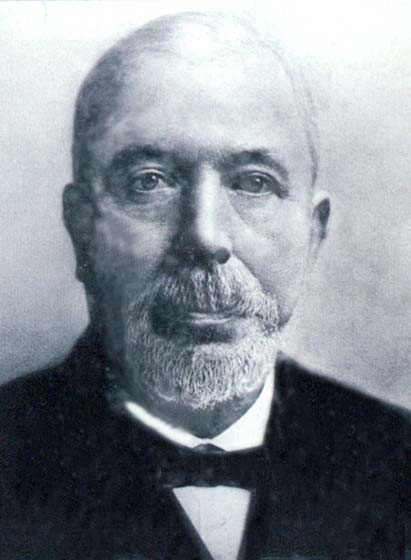
John Houlding

John Houlding (1833–1902)

The prosperous brewer was active as a Conservative councillor for the Everton & Kirkdale ward and eventually as Lord Mayor of Liverpool. As the first president of Everton Football Club, he ushered the club from Stanley Park to the Anfield ground adjacent to his Sandon Hotel and masterminded the 10-year transformation from amateur enthusiasts into League champions. It was as an Orangeman and Anfield landlord that he gained notoriety. He sought to charge more rent after the club became successful. This brought Houlding into conflict with the Everton committee before he served them with a notice to quit in 1892 and recruited a new squad of players for his new club. Within nine seasons Liverpool Football Club was anointed League champions.

=== The Good Doctor of Robson Street ===
James Clement Baxter (1857–1928) His dedication to the welfare of his patients, Irish migrants, the poor and local orphans, is legendary. It was almost matched by his devotion to Everton Football Club. Dr Baxter provided substantial funds to finance the construction of Goodison Park. James Baxter was a passionate Evertonian who served as a director, chairman and club doctor for nearly four decades. Born in Liverpool, the devout Roman Catholic also took an active part in local politics, serving as a Liberal councillor for the St Anne's ward from 1906 until 1920. His son Cecil succeeded him on the board and as the club doctor. This resulted in an unbroken link of 65 years between his family and his football club.

=== Blue Moses ===
George Mahon (1853–1908) Liverpool-born son of Dubliner parents, partner at the accounting firm of Roose, Mahon & Howard, organist at Great Homer Street Wesleyan Chapel and a Liberal politician, George Mahon was elected to the Everton committee in 1889. He clashed with John Houlding on the proposed improvements to the rented ground at Anfield, the term of the lease and also the size of the rent. Also he opposed the use of the Sandon Hotel as the club's headquarters and, anticipating expulsion from Anfield, arranged to lease Mere Green from Mr. CJ Leyland. In his role as Everton's first chairman, Mahon oversaw progress to two FA Cup finals before capturing the trophy in 1906. However, he will be always be celebrated as the man who led the club to the promised land in 1892.

=== Honest John of Liverpool ===
John McKenna (1855–1938) John McKenna was one of the many Ulstermen who came to Merseyside in search of work. A Freemason, Orangeman and Tory, he sided with John Houlding after 'The Split'. Subsequently, he was appointed secretary-manager and recruited the famous 'Team of Macs' which facilitated Liverpool's admission to Division 2 and eventual elevation to the top flight. Afterwards, McKenna concentrated on his administrative duties and served his club faithfully for four decades or so, during which time it captured the League title on three occasions. He retired in 1922 to devote his energies to the Football League. His friendship with Will Cuff created deep bonds between the Reds and the Blues.

=== Mr Everton ===
Will Cuff (1868–1949) While respected as the choir-master and trustee at St Domingo Chapel, Will Cuff (1868–1949) was venerated at Everton. The local solicitor served as secretary, director and chairman and effectively ran the club for four decades. Cuff's first tastes of success were the 1906 FA Cup win and the 1914/15 League title. As chairman, he led the club to the 1926/27 and 1931/32 League titles and the 1933 FA Cup triumph. Cuff stood down at the start of the successful 1938/39 season in order to replace his friend John McKenna as the President of the Football League but is still remembered as the man who demanded ‘School of Science’ style of play.
