= David France Collection =

Collection of Everton FC memorabilia

Coordinates: 53.40986°N 2.98028°W

The David France Collection is a collection of football memorabilia, consisting of more than 10,000 items related to the birth and development of Everton Football Club in Liverpool, England.

== Overview ==
Dr David France took over 25 years to assemble the collection from his home in the United States and includes rare programmes, season tickets, match tickets, medals, photographs, player contracts, cash books, handbooks, financial statements and other ephemera dating back to the 1880s, as well as the official club ledgers detailing the minutes of all board meetings between 1886 and 1964.

For health reasons, Dr France decided finally to part with his collection in 2002. Despite receiving numerous offers from private investors, his dream was to make the collection available to what he called The Everton Family, and sought to transfer his world-class archives to an independent Charitable Trust, at a heavily discounted price.

In September 2007, the Everton Charitable Trust announced that it had secured a grant from the UK Heritage Lottery Fund to obtain the collection, and it was finally transferred from Dr France to the Trust on 31 December 2007. Following this transfer, it was also announced that Everton F.C. would donate their own collection of memorabilia, and that, collectively, it would be known as The Everton Collection.

== Club ledgers ==
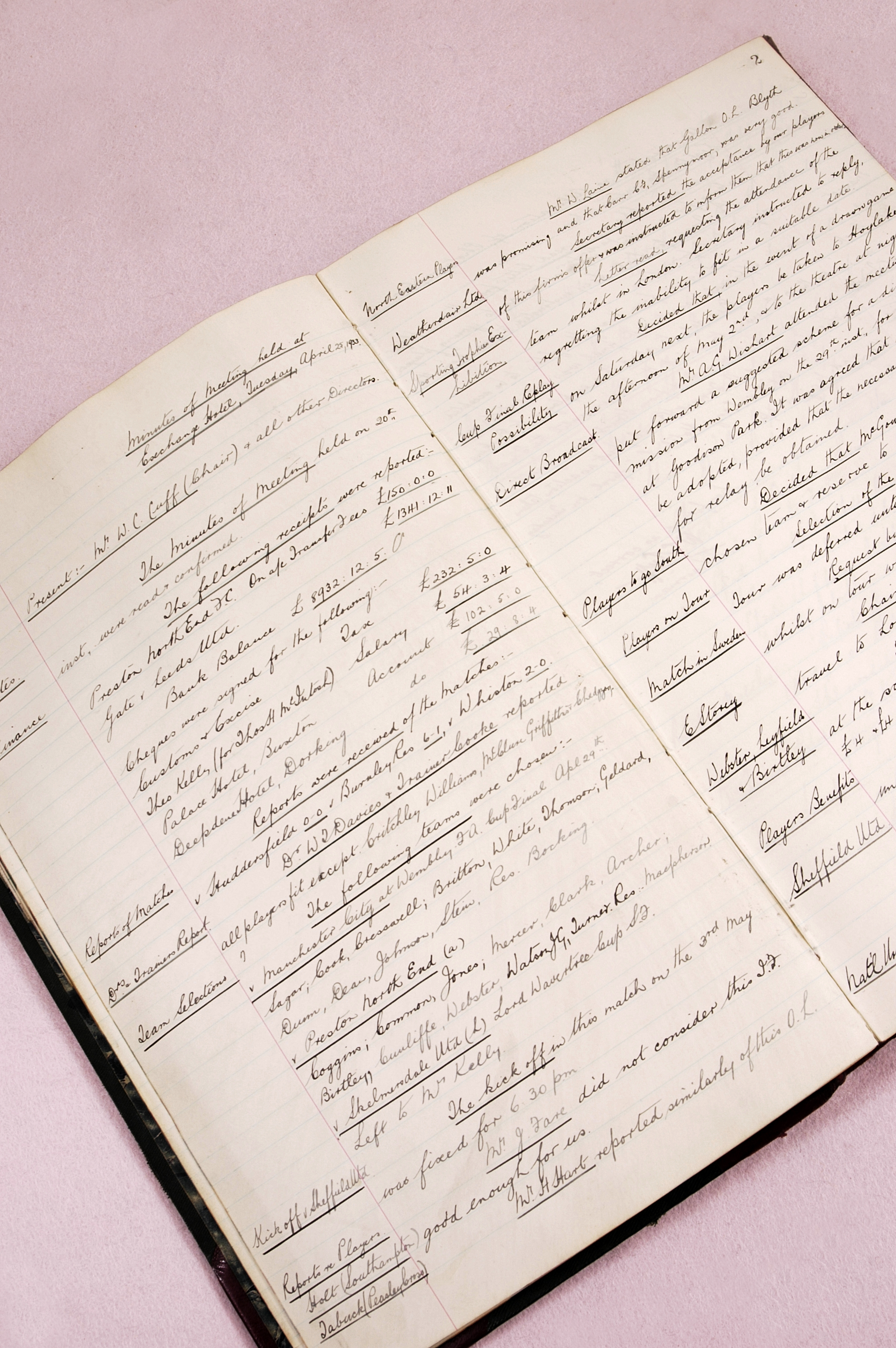
A page from the official club ledgers detailing the team selected by the board for the 1933 F.A. Cup Final against Manchester City.

Often referred to as The Everton Scriptures, and sometimes as The DNA of Everton, the official club ledgers chronicle the minutes of the weekly scheduled and emergency meetings of the early Management Committee, and latterly the Board of Directors, and provide details of the decisions of the Directors at over 5,000 meetings recorded in over 10,000 handwritten pages.

The collection boasts an unbroken sequence of 29 volumes from 1886 through to 1964. Prepared and signed by famous club chairmen, including John Houlding, George Mahon, Will Cuff and Sir John Moores, the ledgers provide the most complete documentation of the development of a professional football club.

Also, because Everton were one of the last professional clubs to appoint a manager, the Directors were responsible for all scouting appraisals, transfer negotiations and team selections during the first six decades, as well as documenting details of players’ wages, bonuses and benefits. The ledgers provide these details on a number of stars from the club's history, including Nick Ross, Jack Southworth, Bert Freeman, Dixie Dean, Warney Cresswell, Cliff Britton, Joe Mercer, Tommy Lawton and Alex Young.

However, the ledgers do not just deal with the club's players; they also include important decisions on the overall running of the club. Some of the most notable events recorded, from the early history of the club, in the ledgers include:

- The founding of the Football League and the subsequent preparations for the inaugural season (Ledger A: 1886–1891)
- The winning of the League Championship, as well as the awarding of the first ever League Championship medals (Ledger B: 1891–1892)
- The buildup of the rent dispute and the departure from Anfield to Goodison Park, which subsequently led to the formation of Liverpool F.C. (Ledger 1: 1892–1898)
- The first FA Cup final to be hosted by a League club, as well as the annual selection of team colours – before Everton settled on royal blue shirts and white shorts in 1902 (Ledger 2: 1898–1903)
- The first overseas tour by an English League club (Ledger 3: 1903–1905)
- The first FA Cup triumph by a Merseyside club (Ledger 4: 1905–1907)

There are also more recent historical events:

- Ground improvements to accommodate over 78,000 spectators at Goodison Park; the installation of state-of-the-art floodlights and under-soil heating and the elimination of the maximum wage for professional footballers. (Ledger 24: 1956–1959)
- The first participation of a Merseyside club in European competition, as well as initial preparations for five 1966 World Cup matches at Goodison Park, including one of the semi-finals. (Ledger 25: 1959–1964)

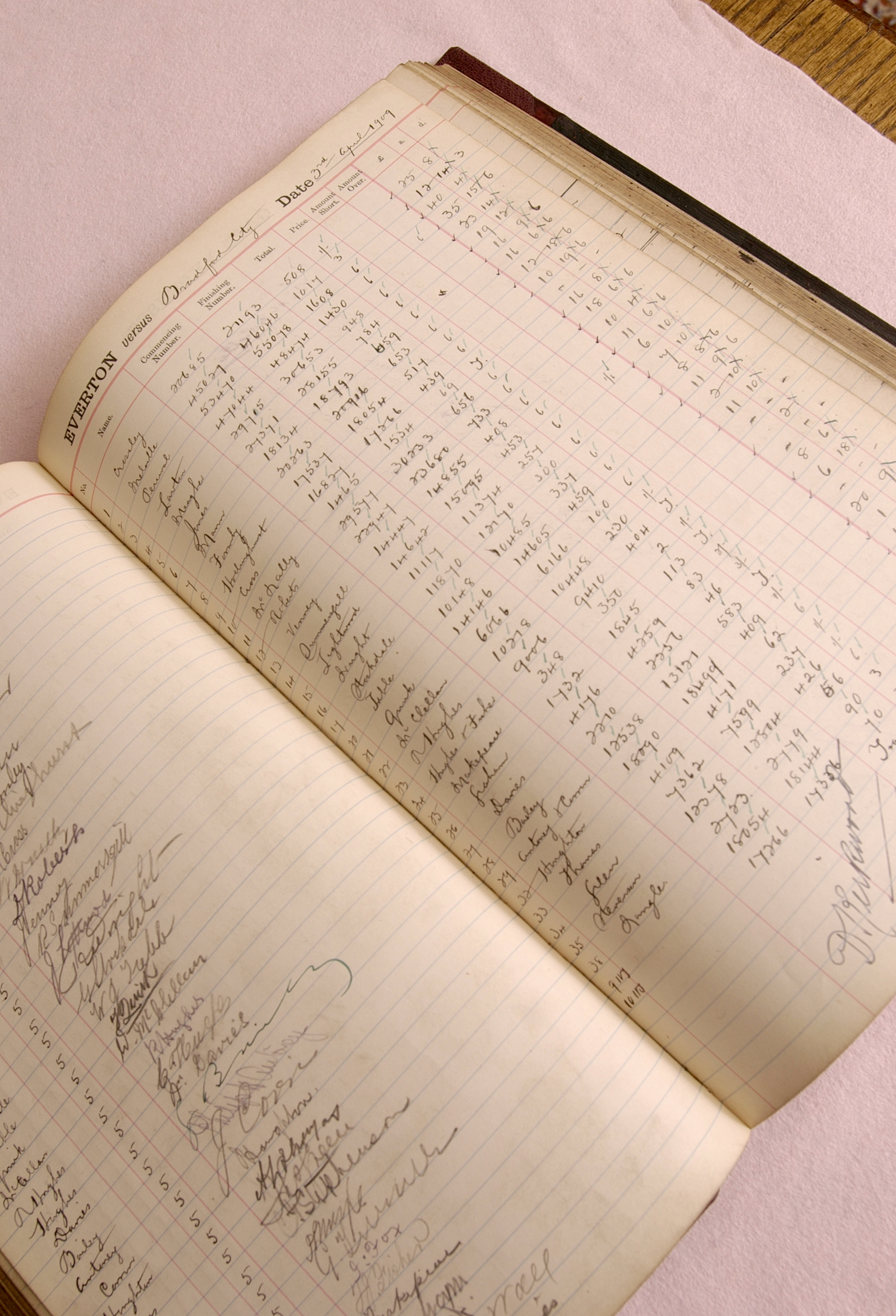
A gatebook from a match versus Bradford City on 3 April 1909.

=== Financial annals ===
In 1895, the amount of cash taken at the turnstiles at Goodison Park seemed to be much lower than what was expected from the attendance predictions of the club's directors, and the local newspaper reporters. At the home match against Sunderland that year, the turnstiles were double-checked prior to kick off and were found to have been tampered with, ensuring that Everton had been defrauded of approximately 15% of the gate money actually taken.

Following the implication and arrest of 15 employees (including turnstile operators, equipment mechanics and groundsmen), Everton introduced meticulously detailed gate books as well as new turnstile equipment.

The collection includes two of these gate books, detailing receipts for each individual turnstile for every match played at Goodison Park from 1907 to 1911 and 1916 to 1921. Each home fixture has a single page dedicated to it and every entry is signed by the turnstile operator and then verified by a club director.

The collection also includes two cash books, from 1892 to 1894 and from 1897 to 1900, providing details of all expenditure following the move to Goodison Park and the initial construction work there.

== Programmes ==
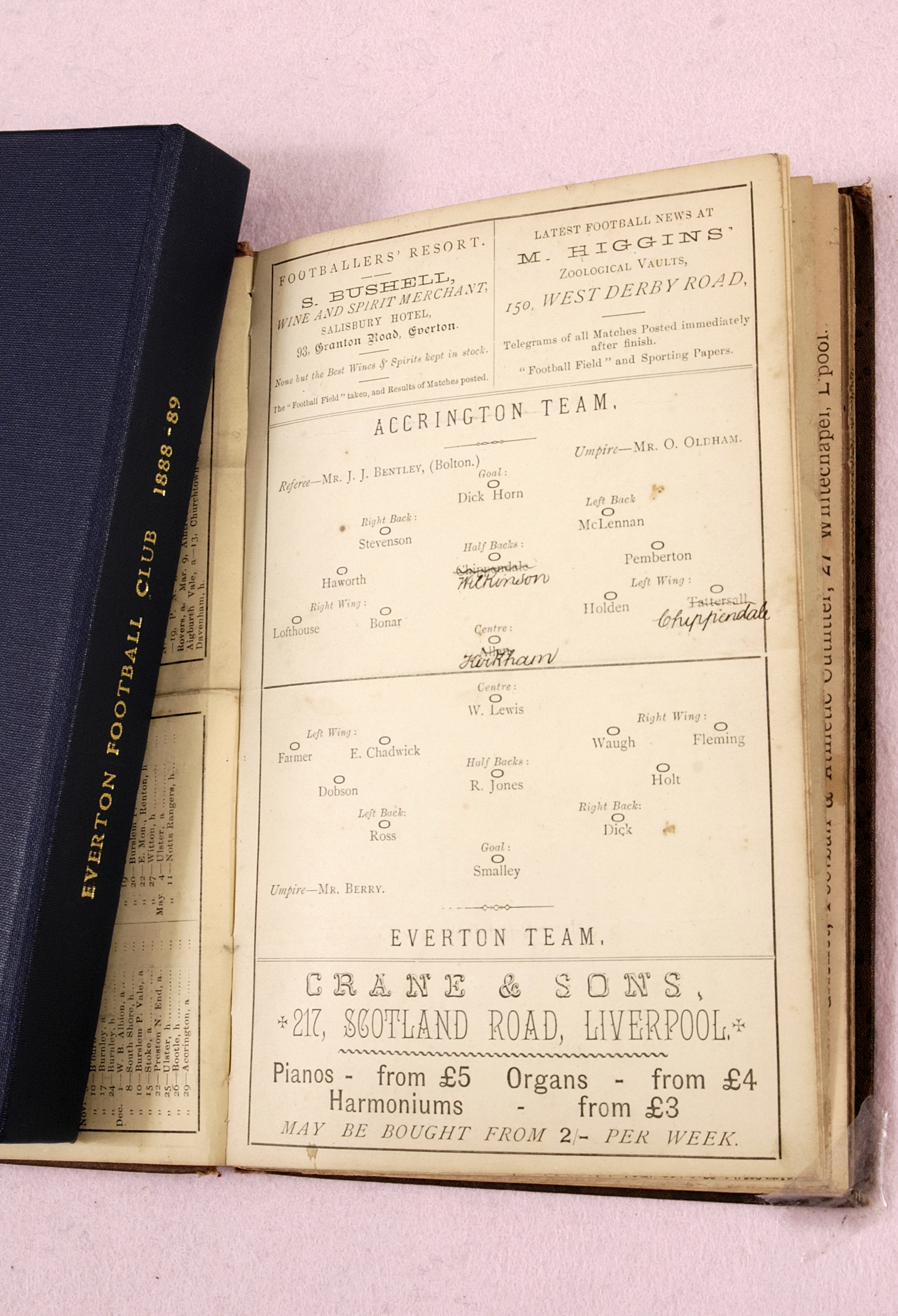
A programme from Everton's first ever Football League match against Accrington on the first day of the first season on 8 September 1888.

The David France Collection contains over 6,000 programmes covering Everton participation, both home and away, in league games, cup competitions, friendlies and reserve-team fixtures between 1886 and 2002.

It is difficult to calculate the precise number of friendly matches Everton have been involved in during this time, however, experts have estimated that the collection features over 90% of all programmes involving Everton over this period, and is hailed as the most complete compilation of such archival

The collection includes every Everton programme published in the inaugural 1888-9 League season. Another highlight is the 32 programmes from the pre-League era when Everton played at Anfield. The collection can also claim to include the earliest known programmes for a number of today's top clubs, including Manchester United (then known as Newton Heath), Celtic, Aston Villa, Derby County, West Bromwich Albion, Bolton Wanderers, Wolverhampton Wanderers and Blackburn Rovers.

It is also thought to contain the earliest home programmes for Southampton, Newcastle United, Walsall, Nottingham Forest, Sheffield United and Sheffield Wednesday, as well as numerous programmes from the early European tours undertaken by the club during the 1930s.

The earliest programme in the collection is from a match Everton played against Astley Bridge on 4 September 1886 at Anfield, with the earliest away programme being when a local team called Stanley entertained Everton on 21 January 1888.

The David France Collection can also claim that it is possibly the biggest collection of Liverpool programmes held privately as Everton and Liverpool produced a joint programme between 1904 and 1935 — nearly a thousand programmes.

== Everton tickets ==
=== Season tickets ===
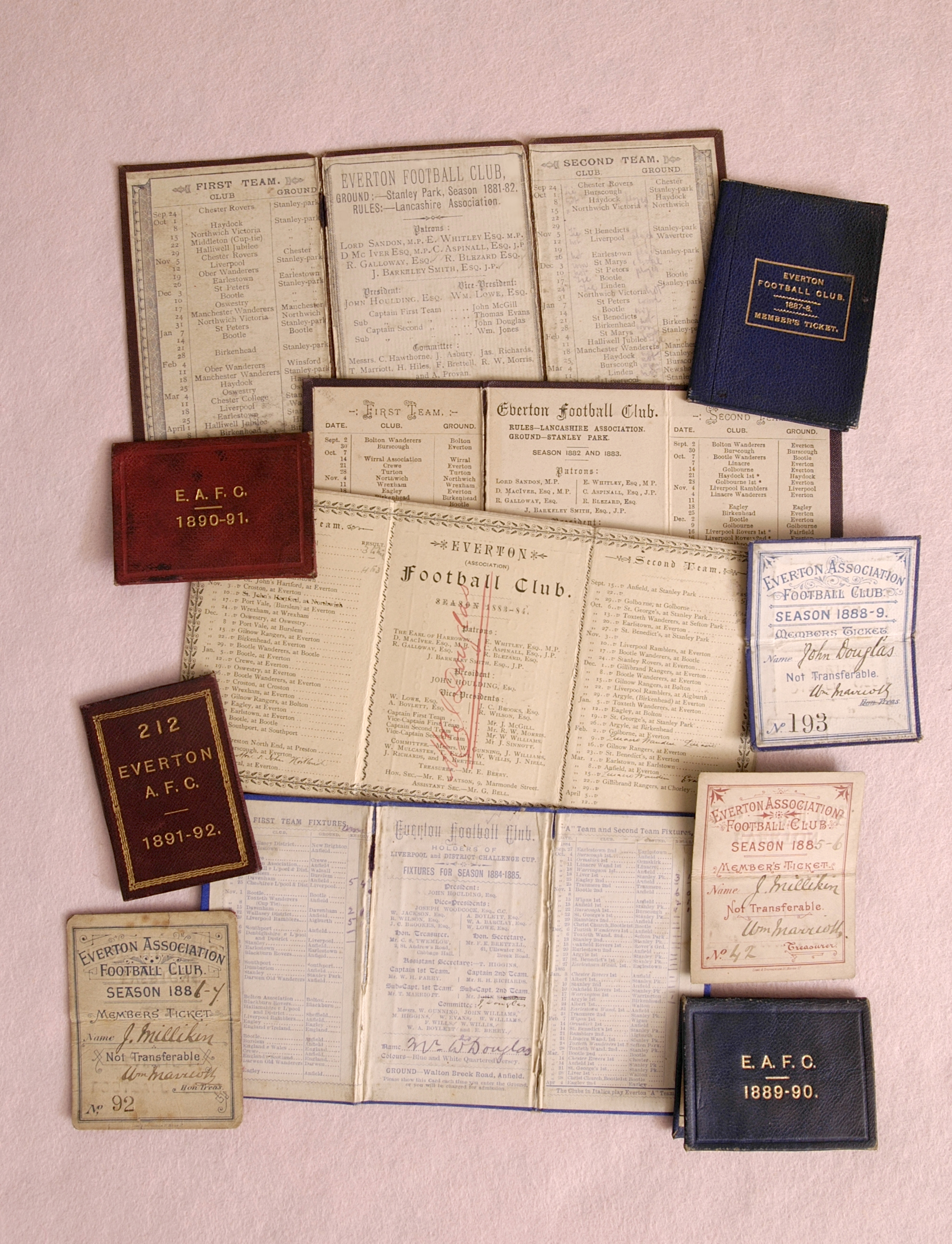
A selection of early Everton season tickets.

In the early days of the club, members (including the players) had to pay an annual subscription and were provided with a season ticket as a result. The David France Collection includes a consecutive run of 11 such season tickets, dating from 1881 through to 1892.

The colours of the member's ticket reflect those of the shirts worn for that season, and not only include first-team and reserve fixture lists for the season, but also some of the club officers including presidents, vice-presidents, secretary, treasurer and the first-team captain.

The earliest season ticket in the collection is for the 1881–82 season allowing the member, and his accompanying lady, to attend games at Stanley Park.

There is also a season ticket for the 1883–84 season, which was the only season that Everton played at Priory Road, before the landlord, Mr James Pruitt, insisted that they move.

Other season tickets included in the collection are from the first season at Anfield (1884–85), the inaugural League campaign (1888–89) and the first League Championship winning season (1890–91).

=== Match tickets ===
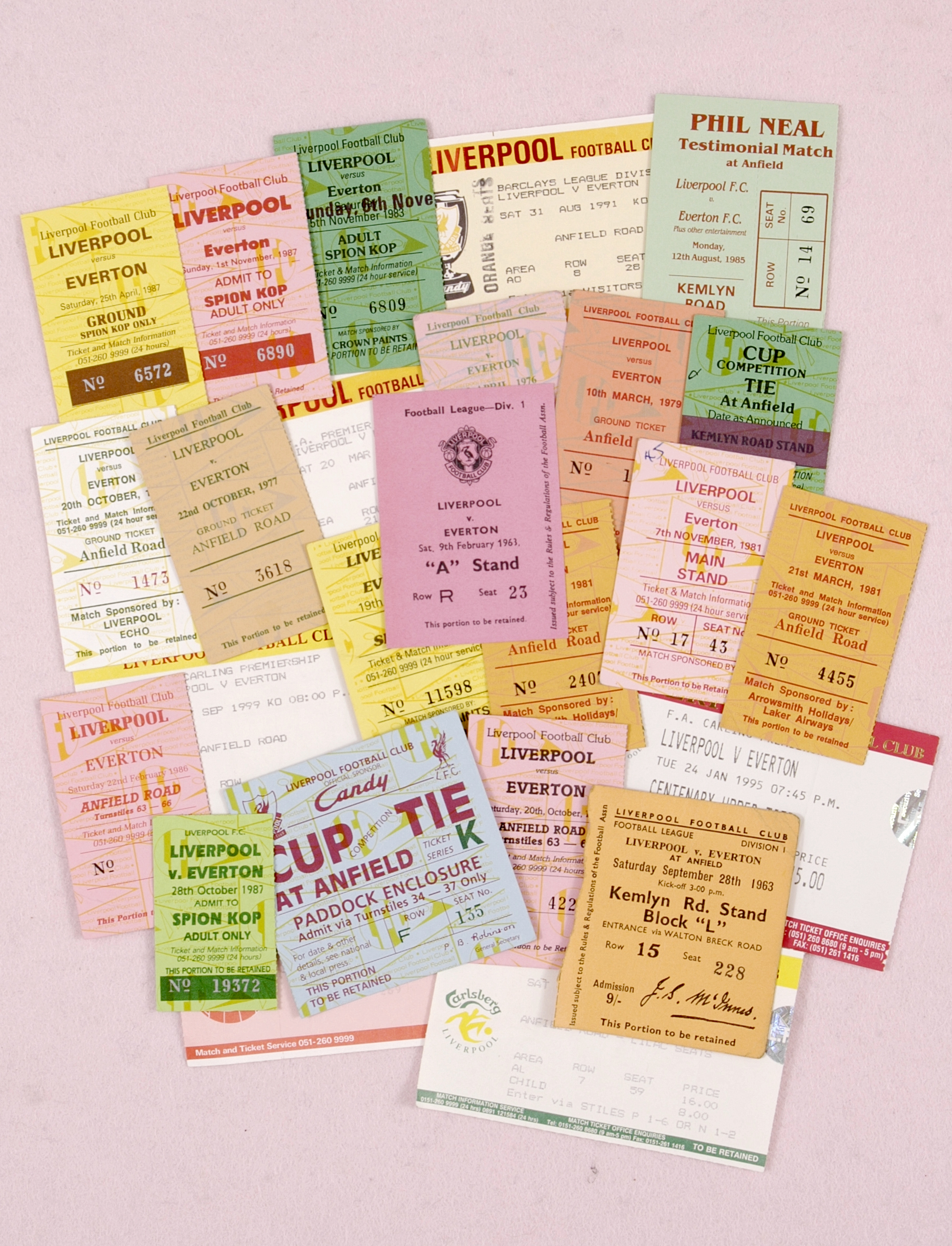
Ticket stubs from matches against Liverpool.

Match tickets were never intended to be saved; however, recently ticket stubs have become one of the more collectible items of memorabilia.

The collection includes hundreds of Everton tickets, not only of Cup Finals and Semifinals, but also less important matches.

When Everton were based at Anfield, they used the local public house, The Sandon, as their base which was owned by the club's president at the time, John Houlding. When the building went through some renovation work in the mid-1990s, a box of old tickets were found. It is believed that a number of these are also included within the collection.

The earliest match ticket is from a game played on 1 May 1890, between Everton and Notts County at Anfield in aid of the Hospital Saturday Fund.

== Medals ==
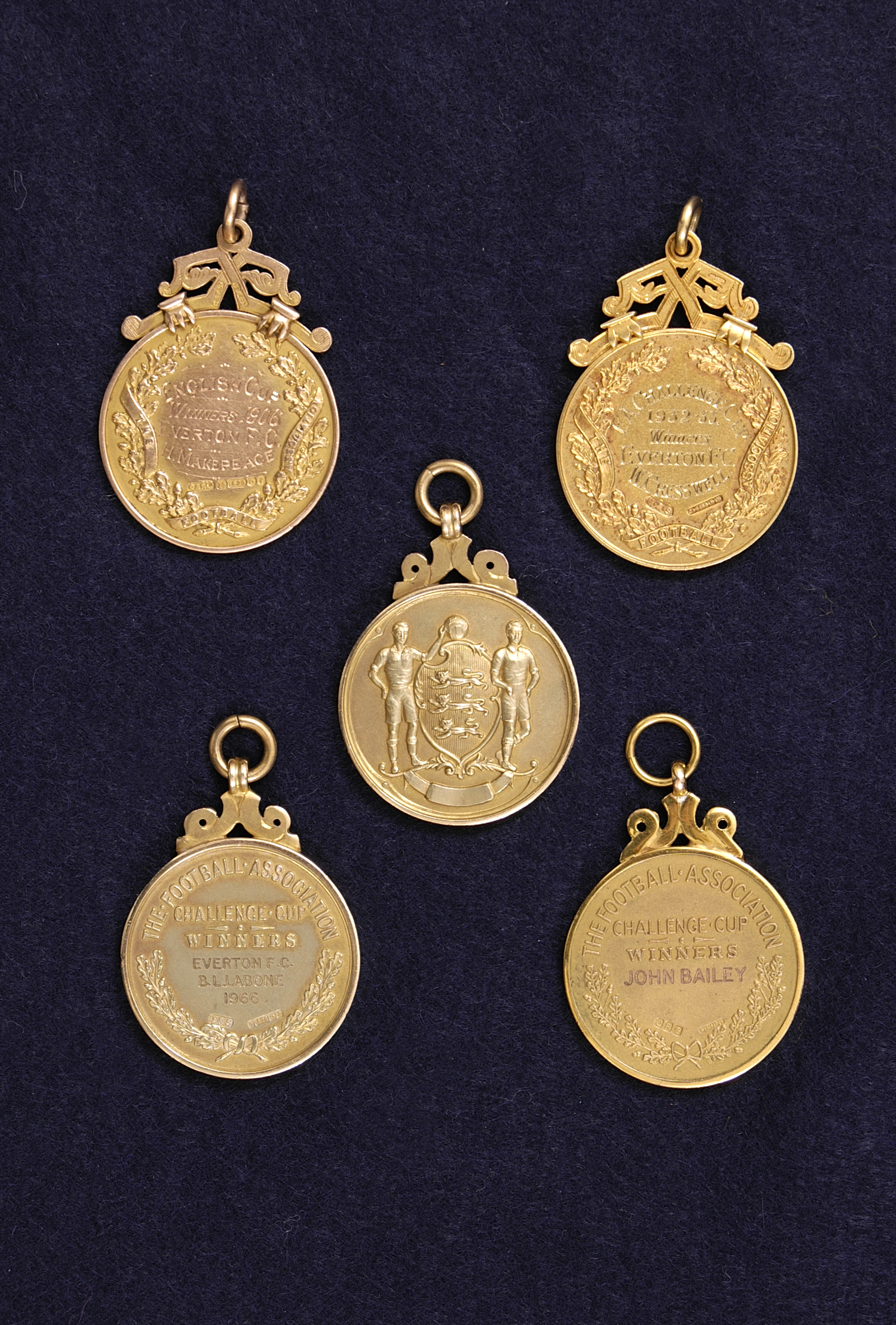
Everton's F.A. Cup winners medals from 1906, 1933, 1966 and 1984.

The collection boasts a total of 40 medals awarded to Everton players in various competitions in their history – including a medal awarded for every major trophy won by the club, except the 1986–87 League Championship and the 1995 FA Cup.

The medals for major competitions won by the club include the first ever League Championship medal awarded to a number of players in 1890–91, as well as medals for the League Championship winning seasons of 1914–15, 1927–28, 1930–31, 1938–39, 1962–63 and 1984–85; the 1906, 1933, 1966 and 1984 FA Cup winners medals plus a 1985 European Cup Winners' Cup medal.

Other medals included within the collection are those awarded for the Wartime Northern League Championship (1918–19), Division Two winners (1931–32), FA Cup runners-up medals (1897, 1907 and 1968), Milk Cup runners-up (1984) plus a number of medals from minor competitions such as the Liverpool Senior Cup (1895, 1899, 1930 and 1934), the Lancashire Cup (1904, 1910 and 1940), Norfolk & Norwich Hospital Cup (1907) and the Blackpool Hospital Cup (1926 and 1927).

While almost all of the medals are gold, the collection includes a silver medal commemorating the 1924 victory over Newcastle United F.C. at the Nou Camp Stadium, when Everton won the Barcelona Cup.

While it is not a medal won with Everton, the collection includes Brian Labone's bronze medal which was awarded when England finished third in the 1968 European Championship.

== Photographs ==
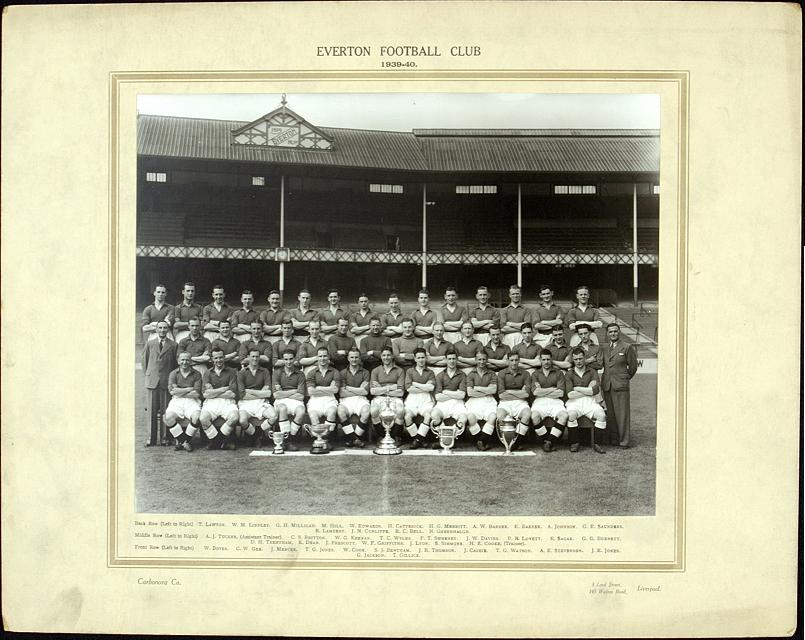
The 1939–40 team photograph.

=== Team groups ===
The corridors of Goodison Park leading to the boardroom boast team photographs dating back to 1929–30. Copies were presented to members of the playing staff and coaching staff.

The collection compliments these souvenirs with a number of early team photographs.

Firstly, there is the earliest known team photograph taken in 1881, shortly after the club had changed its name from St. Domingo F.C.

The collection contains other rarities, such as one photograph taken of Everton's first League Championship-winning side. It was taken on the bowling green of the Sandon Hotel (the club's headquarters at the time) and is the only known photograph of the Everton team wearing their infamous ruby shirts with blue trim. The sepia-toned photograph featured the diminutive Fred Geary sandwiched between the 1891 League championship trophy and the Liverpool Cup.

=== Candid photographs ===
The collection also includes over 100 photographs of players and staff taken by journalists and photographers during training sessions, social events and road trips. The candid snaps that weren't used in publications were usually discarded from the newspaper libraries and photographic studios, but do provide a social commentary on the lifestyles and fashions of professional footballers between 1925 and 1975.

One example shows the team boarding a Cambrian Airlines prop-plane for a 48-hour journey to Australia, in their tailored club suits, prior to the club's tour there in May 1964.

Other examples include candid shots of the team on the coach which took them to Speke Airport en route to an FA Cup fifth round tie at Roker Park in 1964, while another shows Ray Wilson, Alex Young, Sandy Brown and Derek Temple sitting in their first-class carriage at Lime Street station prior to their leaving for the 1966 FA Cup Final.

== Ephemera ==
=== Postcards and postal covers ===
In 1902, the Post Office finally allowed the message and address to be written on one side of a postcard and, thus, freed the other side of the postcard for the inclusion of a picture. As a result, postcards increased substantially in popularity and became a cheap medium for the transmission of messages, until the advent of the telephone.

Local photographers often recorded interesting community events and then published them as postcards and the collection includes 20 postcards featuring Everton teams and players from the early 20th century, the majority of which show team photographs prior to important matches.

In the late 20th century, postal covers were introduced as a means of commemorating special events or anniversaries. The David France Collection includes over 50 postal covers (or first-day covers as they are sometimes known). Many of these postal covers were autographed by the stars of the matches and issued as a numbered limited edition.

=== Cigarette cards ===
Football was one of the more popular subjects for illustrating cigarette cards. The collection includes all 312 cigarette cards ever known to be produced involving Everton between 1897 and 1939.

The first Everton player to appear on a cigarette card was Harry Reay in a series published by Cohen Weenen in 1897, which was surprising given that he only made 2 first-team appearances for Everton during his career.

One of the most popular subjects of Everton cigarette cards was Bill ‘Dixie’ Dean who appeared on 28 different cards, which is believed to make him the most popular subject of football related cigarette cards ever.

=== Trade cards ===
While cigarette cards were discontinued due to post-War rationing of tobacco, other trade cards were produced by tea and confectionery manufacturers, as well as newspapers and magazines.

In the mid-1950s bubble-gum cards were introduced and grew in popularity throughout the 1960s and 1970s. Nowadays, cards are produced along similar lines to the trading cards of Major League Baseball in America.

The first Everton player to appear on a bubble-gum card was Dave Hickson in 1956, and the most popular players on these cards were Alan Ball, Roy Vernon, Alex Young, Ray Wilson and Gordon West.

=== Player contracts ===
Prior to licensed football agents, football clubs had considerable power over the players and provided them with standard 12-month contracts.

The collection includes 20 examples of standard contracts drafted by the Football League and used by Everton between 1890 and 1975.

=== Letters ===
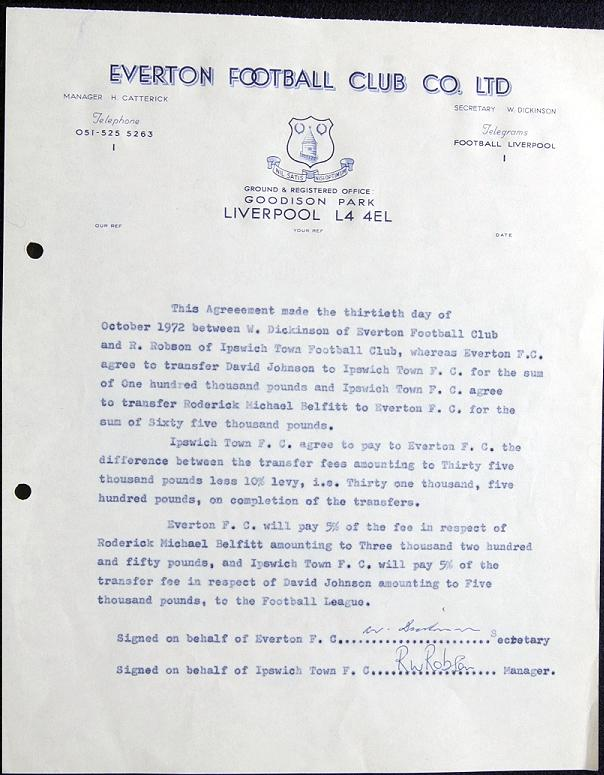
The letter detailing the transfer of David Johnson to Ipswich Town.

The collection includes over 200 letters showing the letterheads of approximately 80 different football clubs addressing all types of business and football issues from the co-ordination of transfers through to the re-arrangement of fixtures. Along with the ledgers, they provide insight into the day-to-day operations of a football club over the decades.

The earliest letter in the collection dates back to 6 March 1888 in which the secretary of Aston Villa invited Everton to play a match at Birmingham later in the month in a hand-written letter.

While the letters shed some light on the transfers of Tony Kay, Dai Davies, Rod Belfitt and Alex Young, as well as many others, they were also used to comply with FA regulations in which teams had to provide their opponents with a list of all eligible players for FA Cup semi-finals and finals.

There are also letters from less affluent clubs with appeals for financial help. One of these was a proposal from Macclesfield Town in which they state that they would be willing to act as a nursery club for Everton — though this was turned down by the Everton board at the time.

=== Autographs ===
The David France Collection includes hundreds of autographs from all eras of the club's history. One notable item is the Training Book from 1931. At this time, one of the rules was that players had to sign in for both morning and afternoon training. A red line was drawn across the page at the allotted time for the start of training and any players signing in after this time were usually fined by the club.

However this book not only includes numerous autographs Everton players from that era, but also includes a description of the exercises specified by Harry Cooke, the Everton trainer at the time. The usual entries for these training sessions show that they alternated between running or walking along with gym work or skipping. Occasionally players were treated to brine baths and even “ball practice – passing movements”.

An example of the training taken can be seen in an entry from August 1931 which shows the autographs of Ted Sagar, Bill ‘Dixie’ Dean, Warney Cresswell, Cliff Britton and 20 team-mates signing in for morning and afternoon training. The morning session consisted of a long walk along Queen's Drive, through West Derby village, and then along the East Lancs Road and Walton Hall Avenue to Goodison Park.

== Reaction to the collection ==
Feedback from memorabilia experts regarding the collection has been positive.

Grant McDougall of Christie's said:

It is the most comprehensive collection of memorabilia I’ve had the good fortune to catalogue. The official ledgers, rare programmes, unique season-tickets and magnificent medals are of interest to football enthusiasts of all ages and all persuasions. And there is so much more.

Graham Budd of Sotheby's added:

This collection has no match anywhere in the football world. It’s a unique record of Everton's history – possibly a history unparalleled by any other club. The collection offers a unique record of the evolution of British football and of the city of Liverpool.

And David Stoker of Liverpool Records Office stated:

The ledgers and programmes are of significant historical importance. They tell the week-by-week story of Merseyside over the past 125 years.

== Everton Collection Charitable Trust ==
120

Dr France claims that he was simply the guardian of Everton's history. It had always been his desire that the people of Merseyside have access to his treasures.

He insisted that all football fans have physical access to the collection in Liverpool, or online access via a dedicated website.

The collection will be housed within the Liverpool Record Office in Liverpool Central Library and is expected to be used in various displays associated with the city's new museum.

Presently, the collection is undergoing digitization which the Trust expects to take approximately one year to complete. After this process, the collection is expected to be available for viewing on a dedicated website, and items being on view at a museum within Everton new stadium, as well as various exhibitions throughout the city of Liverpool.

The dedicated website is now available at http://www.evertoncollection.org.uk/.
