= Goodison Park =

Football stadium in Walton, Liverpool

Coordinates: 53°26′20″N 2°57′59″W

- "The Grand Old Lady"
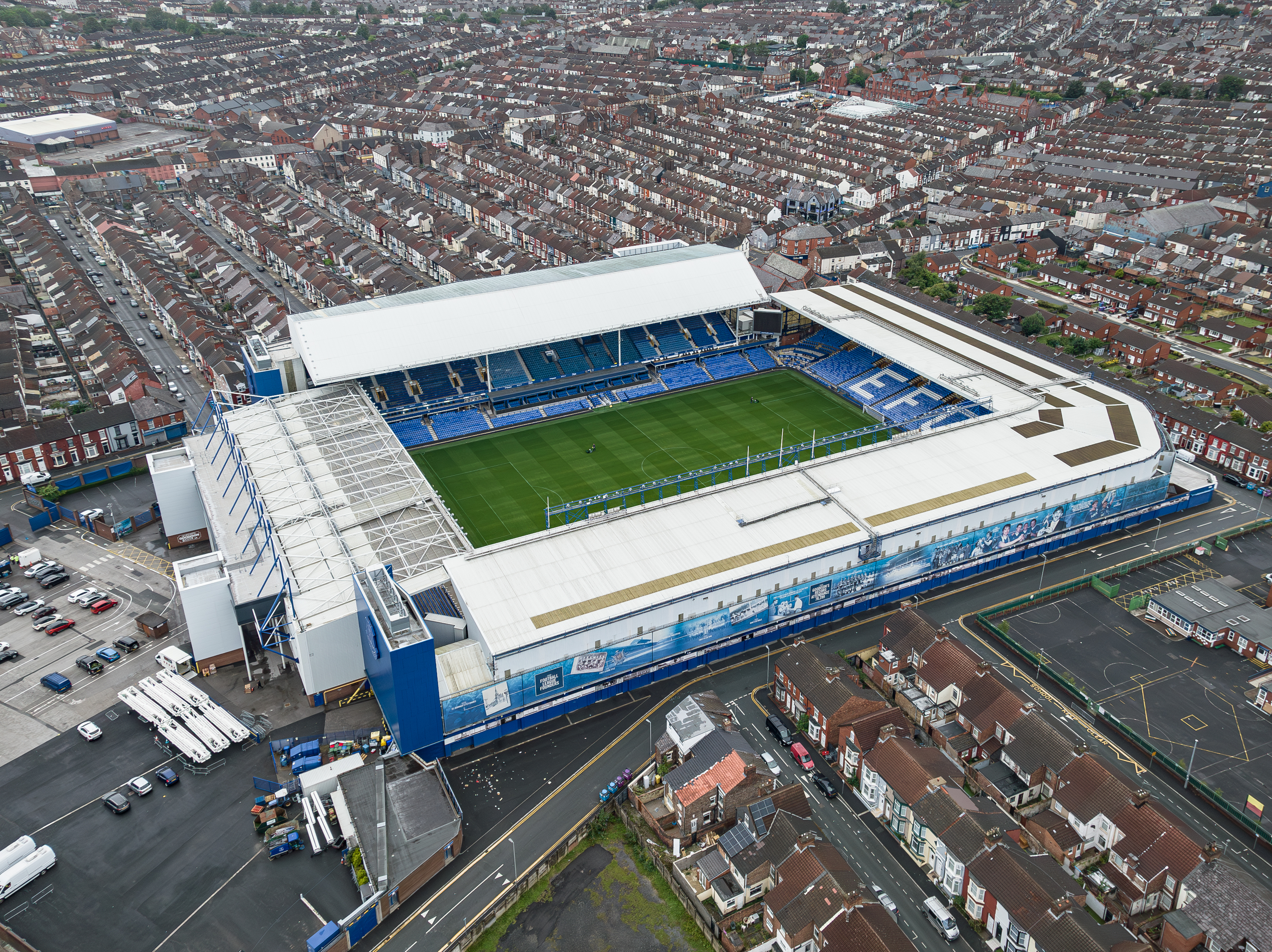
- Aerial view of Goodison Park
- Interactive map of Goodison Park
- Former names: Mere Green Field
- Location: Goodison Road; Walton, Liverpool
- Owner: Everton
- Operator: Everton Women
- Capacity: 39,414
- Surface: GrassMaster
- Record attendance: 78,299 (Everton vs Liverpool, 18 September 1948)
- Field size: 100.49 by 68 metres (109.9 yd × 74.4 yd)
- Public transit: Kirkdale

Construction
- Opened: 24 August 1892; 134 years ago
- Cost: £3,000 (Note: This is the original cost of the ground. Further costly developments have occurred since.)
- Architects: Kelly Brothers; Henry Hartley; Archibald Leitch

Tenants
- Everton (1892–2025); Everton Women (2025–): Major sporting events hosted; 1966 FIFA World Cup

Goodison Park is a football stadium in Walton, Liverpool, England, two miles (3 km) north of the city centre. It was built to serve as the home ground of Everton and opened in 1892. Goodison Park hosted the 1910 FA Cup Final, and was also a venue for the 1966 World Cup, in addition to hosting numerous other international fixtures. Everton relocated to the Hill Dickinson Stadium in 2025, and the stadium became the home of Everton Women. It has an all-seated capacity of 39,414.

== History ==
=== Before Goodison Park ===
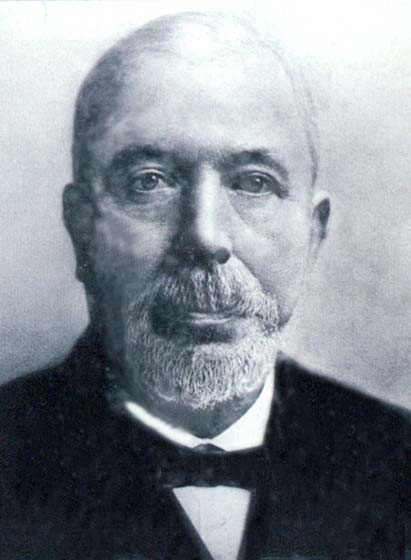
John Houlding, former Everton chairman and Anfield landowner

Everton originally played on an open pitch in the south-east corner of the newly laid out Stanley Park (on a site where rivals Liverpool considered building a stadium over a century later). The first official match following the renaming of the club from St. Domingo's to Everton was at Stanley Park, staged on 20 December 1879; St. Peter's was the opposition, and admission was free. In 1882, a man named J. Cruit donated land at Priory Road with the necessary facilities required for professional clubs, but asked the club to leave his land after two years because the crowds became too large and noisy.

Everton moved to nearby Anfield Road, a site where proper covered stands were built. Everton played at the Anfield ground from 1884 until 1892. During this time the club turned professional, entering teams in the FA Cup. They became founding members of the Football League, winning their first championship at the ground in 1890–91. Anfield's capacity grew to over 20,000, with the club hosting an international match as England played against Ireland. During their time at Anfield, Everton became the first club to introduce goalnets to professional football.

In the 1890s, a dispute about how the club was to be owned and run emerged with John Houlding, Anfield's majority owner and Everton's Chairman, at the forefront. Houlding disagreed with the club's committee, initially disagreeing about the full purchase of the land at Anfield from minor land owner Mr Orrell and later escalating into a principled disagreement about how the club was run. Two such disagreements included Houlding wanting Everton to sell only his brewery products during an event and for the Everton players to use his public house The Sandon as changing room facilities.

The most well-known of the disagreements concerns the level of increased rent Everton was asked to pay. In 1889, Everton paid £100 to Houlding in rent; by the 1889–90 season, this had risen to £250. Everton had to pay for all works and stands. The dispute escalated to a rent of £370 per year being demanded. In the complicated lead-up to the split in the club, the rent dispute is too simplistic to be singled out as the prime cause. The dispute was compounded by many minor disputed points.

The flashpoint was a covenant in the contract of land purchase by Houlding from Orrell causing further and deep friction. A strip of land at the Anfield ground bordering the adjacent land owned by Mr Orrell, could be used to provide a right of way access road for Orrell's landlocked vacant site. In early 1891, the club erected a stand on this now proposed roadway, which was also overlapping Orrell's land, unbeknown to the Everton Committee. In August 1891, Orrell announced intentions of developing his land next to the football ground, building an access road on the land owned by Houlding and occupied by Everton.

Everton stated it knew nothing of the covenant; Houlding stated it did. This situation created great distrust, leading to friction between Houlding and the Everton Committee. The rift and distrust between the two parties was on three levels: Houlding's personal business intentions, politically and morally. Nevertheless, the club faced a dilemma of having to destroy the new revenue generating stand or compensate Orrell.

Houlding's way around the problem was to propose a limited company with floatation of the club enabling the club to purchase Houlding's and Orrell's land outright, hoping to raise £12,000. Previous attempts to raise money from the community had failed miserably. This would have meant the club would need to find £6,000 in cash with an additional £4,875 mortgage. The Everton Committee initially accepted Houlding's proposal in principle, yet voted against it at a meeting.

After much negotiating and brinkmanship on both sides Everton vacated Anfield, leaving Houlding with an empty stadium with no one to play in it. As a consequence, Houlding formed his own football club, Liverpool, to take up residence at the stadium.

The clubs have differing versions of events of why it occurred.

Houlding explained why this situation arose in a Liverpool match programme against Cliftonville in April 1893. He pointed out that he had given Everton a rent free loan until the club started to make money. If the club had gone bust he would have lost it all.

Despite making no profit in this respect, the issue that upset the members at Everton most was his plan to sell Anfield and the land adjoining, with Houlding himself profiting. He felt it was a reasonable reward for the risk he had ventured in the club for nine years. Houlding, as the ambitious businessman he was, saw a great future for the club. He wanted the club to have its own home ground and wanted them to buy land so the club could expand in due course.

Unfortunately most of the Everton board members failed to share his forward thinking and lacked confidence. They wanted instead a long term rent deal on all the land, but for this to be acceptable to Houlding, he wanted a rent at a price considered too high for the Club. The members reacted to that by "offering" Houlding less rent. Houlding unsurprisingly refused to accept this stating that he did not want to be dictated: "I cannot understand why a gentleman that has done so much for the club [Everton] and its members should be given such treatment".

— Liverpool version of events

During their spell at Anfield, John Houlding decided to charge the Club rent based on the increase of gate receipts from attendances and not, as was previously the case, at a fixed rate.

"This – along with other conflicts with Everton – led to the Club being expelled from Anfield in 1892 and in need of a new home....

fully expecting Houlding to dismiss Everton from their Anfield home, he (George Mahon) acquired land on a patch off Stanley Park called 'Mere Green Field' and also made sure that the Club kept their name."

— Everton version of events

=== Genesis of Goodison Park ===
On 15 September 1891, a general meeting took place at Royal Street Hall, near Everton Valley. Everton's chairman John Houlding proposed that a limited company be formed with the new company purchasing his land and local brewer Joseph Orrell's adjacent land for a combined £9,237. A club run as a limited company was unusual for the time; football clubs were usually run as "sports clubs" with members paying an annual fee. The proposal was supported by William Barclay, the club secretary and a close friend of Houlding.

George Mahon arranged for Everton to move to Goodison Park.

Liberal Party politician and Everton board member George Mahon fought the proposal putting forward his own amendment which was carried by the Everton board. At the time Everton's board contained both Conservative and Liberal Party councillors. Houlding and Mahon had previously clashed during local elections.

Both men agreed that Everton should operate as a limited company; however, they had different ideas about share ownership. Houlding suggested that 12,000 shares be created with each Everton board member given one share and the other shares sold to the public or Everton board members. Mahon disagreed and proposed that 500 shares be created with no member carrying more than 10 shares with board members given "7 or 8" shares. Mahon reasoned "we would rather have a large number of individual applications so that there will be more supporters of the club."

A special general meeting was convened at the former Liverpool College building on Shaw Street on 25 January 1892. John Houlding's proposal was defeated once more with George Mahon suggesting that Everton relocate to another site. A heckler shouted, "You can't find one!" Mahon responded: "I have one in my pocket", revealing an option to lease Mere Green field, in Walton, Lancashire, the site of the current Goodison Park.

The Liverpool press were partisan. The proposal was deemed to be a positive move for the club by the Liberal-leaning Liverpool Daily Post which described Houlding's ousting as "having shaken off the incubus". The Tory-supporting Liverpool Courier and Liverpool Evening Express—owned by Conservative MP for Everton, John A. Willox, a Trustee of the Licensed Victuallers' and Brewers' Association—took Houlding's side. The Courier published letters regularly criticising Mahon's supporters—many of which were anonymous. Philanthropist William Hartley, a jam manufacturer and Robert William Hudson, a prominent soap-manufacturer supported Mahon.

The stadium was named Goodison Park because the length of the site was built against Goodison Road. The road was named after a civil engineer named George Goodison who provided a sewage report to the Walton Local Board in the mid-1800s, later becoming a local landowner.

Behold Goodison Park! no single picture could take in the entire scene the ground presents, it is so magnificently large, for it rivals the greater American baseball pitches. On three sides of the field of play there are tall covered stands, and on the fourth side the ground has been so well banked up with thousands of loads of cinders that a complete view of the game can be had from any portion.

The spectators are divided from the playing piece by a neat, low hoarding, and the touch line is far enough from it to prevent those accidents which were predicted at Anfield Road, but never happened... Taking it all together, it appears to be one of the finest and most complete grounds in the kingdom, and it is hoped that the public will liberally support the promoters.

— "Out of Doors", October 1892

The Mere Green field was owned by Christopher Leyland with Everton renting until they were in a position to buy the site outright. Initially, the field needed work as parts of the site needed excavation, the field was levelled, a drainage system was installed and turf was laid. This work was considered to be a 'formidable initial expenditure' with local contractor Mr Barton contracted to work on the 29,471 square yards (25,000 m^{2}) site at 4½d per square yard—a total cost of £552. A J. Prescott was brought in as an architectural advisor and surveyor.

Walton-based building firm Kelly Brothers were instructed to erect two uncovered stands that could each accommodate 4,000 spectators. A third covered stand accommodating 3,000 spectators was also requested. The combined cost of these stands was £1,640. Everton inserted a penalty clause into the contract in case the work was not completed by its 31 July deadline. Everton officials were impressed with the builder's workmanship agreeing two further contracts: exterior hoardings were constructed at a cost of £150 with 12 turnstiles installed at a cost of £7 each. In 1894, Benjamin Kelly of Kelly Brothers was appointed as a director of Everton.

Dr. James Baxter of the Everton committee donated a £1,000 interest-free loan to build Goodison Park. The stadium was England's first purpose-built football ground, with stands on three sides. Goodison Park was officially opened on 24 August 1892 by Lord Kinnaird and Frederick Wall of the Football Association. No football was played; instead the 12,000 crowd watched a short athletics event followed by music and a fireworks display. Upon its completion the stadium was the first joint purpose-built football stadium in the world; Celtic's basic Celtic Park ground in Glasgow, Scotland was inaugurated on the same day as Goodison Park.

The first known image of Goodison Park. Published by the Liverpool Echo in August 1892

The first football match at Goodison Park was on 2 September 1892 between Everton and Bolton Wanderers. Everton wore its new club colours of salmon and dark blue stripes and won the exhibition game 4–2. The first league game at Goodison Park took place on 3 September 1892 against Nottingham Forest; the game ended in a 2–2 draw. The stadium's first competitive goal was scored by Forest's Horace Pike and the first Everton goal scored by Fred Geary. Everton's first league victory at their new ground came in the next home game with a 6–0 defeat of Newton Heath in front of an estimated 10,000 spectators.

It was announced at a general meeting on 22 March 1895 that the club could finally afford to buy Goodison Park. Mahon revealed that Everton were buying Goodison Park for £650 less than the price of Anfield three years earlier, with Goodison Park having more land and a 25% larger capacity. The motion to purchase Goodison Park was passed unanimously. Dr. Baxter also lent the club £5,000 to redeem the mortgage early at a rate of 3½%. By this time the redrawing of political boundaries put Walton, and hence Goodison Park, inside the City of Liverpool.

In 1999, The Independent newspaper journalist David Conn unexpectedly coined the nickname "The Grand Old Lady" for the stadium, when he wrote: "Another potential suitor has apparently thought better of Everton, walking away on Tuesday from the sagging Grand Old Lady of English football, leaving her still in desperate need of a makeover."

=== Structural developments ===
Bullens Road c.1905

Goodison Road c.1905

The Goodison Park structure was built in stages. In the summer of 1895, a new Bullens Road stand was built and a roof placed on the original Goodison Road stand but only after five directors, including chairman, George Mahon had resigned over what was described in the club minutes as 'acute administrative difficulties'. In 1906, the double-decker Goodison Avenue Stand was built behind the goal at the south end of the ground. The stand was designed by Liverpool architect Henry Hartley who went on to chair the Liverpool Architectural Society a year later. The club minutes from the time show that Hartley was unhappy with certain aspects of the stand and the poor sightlines meant that the goal line had to be moved seven metres north, towards Gwladys Street. In January 1908, he complained that his fees had not been paid and the bill for the stand was near £13,000. There were 2,657 seats on its upper tier with a terrace below.

Archibald Leitch designed the Goodison Road Stand with construction in 1909. In September that year, Ernest Edwards, the Liverpool Echo journalist who christened the terrace at Anfield the "Spion Kop", wrote of the newly built stand: "The building as one looks at it, suggests the side of Mauretania at once." The stand was occasionally referred to as the "Mauretania Stand", in reference to the Liverpool-registered RMS Mauretania, then the world's largest ship, which operated from the Port of Liverpool.

The two-tier steel frame and wooden floor Bullens Road Stand, designed by Archibald Leitch, was completed in 1926. The upper tier was seated, with terracing below, a part of the ground called The Paddock. Few changes were made until 1963 when the rear of the Paddock was seated and an overhanging roof was added. The stand is known for Archibald Leitch's highly distinctive balcony trusses which also act as handrails for the front row of seats in the Upper Bullens stand. Goodison Park is the only stadium with two complete trusses designed by Leitch. Of the 17 created, only Goodison Park, Ibrox and Fratton Park retain these trusses.

Everton constructed covered dugouts in 1931. The idea was inspired by a visit to Pittodrie to play a friendly against Aberdeen, where such dugouts had been constructed at the behest of the Dons' trainer Donald Colman. The Goodison Park dugouts were the first in England.

Goodison Park was bombed in September 1940

The ground become an entirely two-tiered affair in 1938 with another Archibald Leitch stand at the Gwladys Street end. The stand completed at a cost of £50,000, being delayed because an old man would not move from his to be demolished home. The original Gwladys Street having had terraced houses on either side, with those backing on to the ground making way for the expansion. Architect Leitch and Everton Chairman Will Cuff became close friends with Cuff appointed as Leitch's accountant with Leitch moving to nearby Formby.

In 1940, during the Second World War, the Gwladys Street Stand suffered bomb damage. The bomb had landed directly in Gwladys Street and caused serious injury to nearby residents. The bomb splinter damage to the bricks on the stand is still noticeable. The cost of repair was £5,000 and was paid for by the War Damage Commission. Damage included the demolition of part of the new stand outer wall on this side, with destruction of all glass in this stand. Further harm was caused on the Bullens Road side by a bomb that fell in the school playground there.

The first floodlit match at Goodison Park took place when Everton hosted Liverpool on 9 October 1957 in front of 58,771 spectators. Four pylons 185 feet (56 m) each with 36 lamps installed were installed behind each corner of the pitch. At the time, they were tallest in the country. There was capacity for 18 more lamps per pylon if it was felt the brightness was insufficient for the game. Each bulb was a 1,500 watt tungsten bulb 15 inches in diameter and cost 25 shillings. It was recommended that the club made a habit of changing them after three to four seasons to save the club performing intermittent repairs. MANWEB installed a transformer sub-station to cope with the 6,000 volt-load.

The first undersoil heating system in English football was installed at Goodison Park in 1958, with 20 miles (30 km) of electric wire laid beneath the playing surface at a cost of £16,000. The system was more effective than anticipated and the drainage system could not cope with the quantity of water produced from the melting of frost and snow. As a consequence the pitch had to be relaid in 1960 to allow a more suitable drainage system to be installed.

The Everton chairman Sir John Moores, who presided over the club between 1960 and 1973, provided finances for the club in the form of loans to become involved in large-scale redevelopment projects and compete with other clubs for the best players; under his stewardship Everton acquired the nickname 'The Mersey Millionaires'.

Goodison Park featured in the filming of The Golden Vision, a BBC film made for television. The matches featured in the film were Division One games against Manchester City on 4 November 1967 (1–1 draw) and 18 November 1967 versus Sheffield United (1–0 win)—the scorer of the winner that day was Alex Young, also known as The Golden Vision or Golden Ghost after whom the film was named.

Everton was the first club to have a scoreboard installed in England. On 20 November 1971, Everton beat Southampton 8–0 with Joe Royle scoring four, David Johnson three and Alan Ball one. The scoreboard did not have enough room to display the goal scorer's names and simply read "7 9 7 9 8 9 9 7" as it displayed the goal scorers' shirt numbers instead.

The Goodison Road Stand was partially demolished and rebuilt during the 1969–70 season with striking images of both old and new stands side by side. The new stand opened in 1971, at a cost of £1 million. The new stand housed the 500 and 300 members clubs and an escalator to the tallest stand in the ground—the Top Balcony. However, not everyone thought that the upgrade was necessary at the time. Journalist Geoffrey Green of The Times wrote: "Goodison Park has always been a handsome fashionable stage for football, a living thing full of atmospherics-like a theatre. And now it has stepped into the demanding seventies with a facelift it scarcely seemed to need compared with some of us I know. New giant stands in place of the old; the latest in dazzling floodlight systems that cast not a shadow. A cathedral of a place indeed, fit for the gods of the game."

The Safety of Sports Grounds Act 1975 saw the Bullens Road Stand extensively fireproofed with widened aisles, which entailed closure of parts of the stand. Because of the closure, Anfield was chosen over first choice Goodison Park for a Wales vs. Scotland World Cup qualifying tie.

After the 1979 season, the rear half of the Park End's wooden terracing was deemed unsafe after problems during an FA Cup semi-final between Manchester United and Liverpool. This area was bricked up, leaving only the front concrete section open for use.

Following Moores' exit from Everton's hierarchy, minimum changes had been made to Goodison Park's structure due to costs, two British Government Acts; the Safety of Sports Grounds Act 1975 and Football Spectators Act 1989 had forced the club's hand into improving the facilities. Upon Moore's death, the club was sold to Peter Johnson.

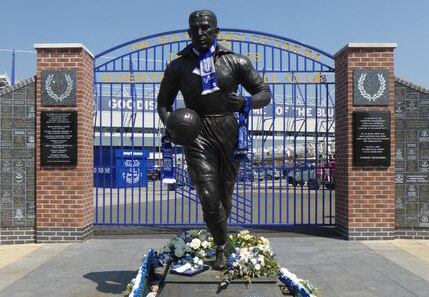
Statue of Dixie Dean outside the main gates of Goodison Park

Everton celebrated the centenary of Goodison Park with a game against German club side Borussia Mönchengladbach in August 1992. In addition, 200 limited edition medals were created.

=== Taylor report ===
Following the publication of the 1990 Taylor Report, in the wake of the Hillsborough disaster, top-flight English football grounds had to become all-seated. At the time, three of the four sides of the ground had standing areas. The Enclosure, fronting the main stand, had already been made all-seated in time for the 1987–88 season and was given the new name of Family Enclosure. The Paddock, the Park End terrace and the Gwladys Street terrace, known as "the Ground", were standing and had to be replaced. The fences around the perimeter of the ground fronting the terracing (which were to prevent fans, notably hooligans, running onto the pitch) were removed immediately post-Hillsborough, in time for the rearranged league fixture with Liverpool. The Everton match versus Luton Town in May 1991 was the final time that Gwladys Street allowed standing spectators. Seats were installed in the Paddock, while the Lower Gwladys Street was later completely rebuilt to accommodate seating with new concrete steps.

Everton opted to demolish the entire Park End stand in 1994 and replace it with a single-tier cantilever stand, with the assistance of a grant of £1.3 million from the Football Trust.

Following the conversion of Goodison Park into an all-seater stadium in 1994, plans for relocation to a new site have been afoot since 1997, when then chairman Peter Johnson announced his intention to build a new 60,000-seat stadium for the club. At the time, no English league club had a stadium with such a high capacity.

In January 2001, plans were drawn up to move to a 55,000-seat purpose-built arena on the site of the King's Dock in Liverpool. The proposed stadium would have had a retractable roof enabling it to be used for concerts and chairman Bill Kenwright had hoped to have it ready for the 2005–06 season.

However, the plans were abandoned in April 2003 due to the club not being able to raise adequate funds. Following this, plans were made to move to Kirkby, just outside the city, in a joint venture with the supermarket chain Tesco. The scheme was greatly divisive amongst supporters and local authorities, but was rejected in late November 2009 following a decision by Secretary of State for Communities and Local Government.

The site of Goodison Park was earmarked in 1997 and 2003 for a food store by Tesco who offered £12 million which was valued at £4 million for the site but Liverpool City Council was advised against allowing planning permission. The club were advised that the planning permission required would not necessarily be granted, and chose not to take the scheme further.

Supporters' groups have fought against the club moving to a new stadium twice. In 2007, a group was established called Keep Everton in Our City (KEIOC) whose aim is to keep Everton inside the city of Liverpool. The KEIOC attempted to prevent the club moving to a new stadium in Kirkby, just outside the city's boundaries. The supporters' groups have argued that it is possible to expand Goodison Park, despite the odd shaped landlocked site being surrounded by housing, local authority buildings, and have produced image renders, architectural drawings and costings for a redeveloped Goodison Park. The then Liverpool City Council leader Warren Bradley stated in November 2009 that a redevelopment of Goodison Park was his favoured option, and that relocation of the homes, infrastructure and businesses in streets adjoining the ground is "not a major hurdle". Council leader Joe Anderson stated that "the setback for Everton was an opportunity for both clubs to go back to the drawing board".

Everton was considering all options, including relocation, redevelopment of the current ground, or a groundshare with Liverpool, in a new, purpose-built stadium in Stanley Park, stressing that finance was the main factor affecting decision-making. In 2010, Everton supporters approached University of Liverpool and Liverpool City Council to initiate a dedicated 'Football Quarter'/'Sports City' zone around Goodison Park, Stanley Park and Anfield. The university and city council met with the North West Development Agency, Everton and Liverpool representatives but no further action was taken.

On 10 February 2011, Liverpool City Council Regeneration and Transport Select Committee proposed to open the eastern section of the Liverpool Outer Loop line using "Liverpool Football Club and Everton Football Club as priorities, as economic enablers of the project". This proposal would place both football clubs on a rapid-transit Merseyrail line circling the city giving high throughput, fast transport access.

In 2016, following his investment in the club by major shareholder Farhad Moshiri, the prospect of a new stadium was once again addressed, with a pair of options mentioned. The preferred option was to resurrect the idea of a riverside stadium, this time in partnership with the Peel Group using the Clarence Dock. However, the other option was a site located at Stonebridge Cross in Gillmoss, which is seen as more easily deliverable in some areas. The dockside site option was later confirmed as Bramley-Moore Dock.

In August 2010, Everton announced plans to build a new development situated between the Park End stand and Walton Lane; the site is currently used for a hospitality marquee. The £9 million scheme was designed by Manchester-based Formroom Architects. In September 2010 the club submitted a planning application to Liverpool City Council.

The proposed development is a four-storey building which include a retail store, ticket office, offices, conference and catering facilities and a museum. The project has been delayed twice and never happened in the end.

=== Transition to Everton Women stadium ===
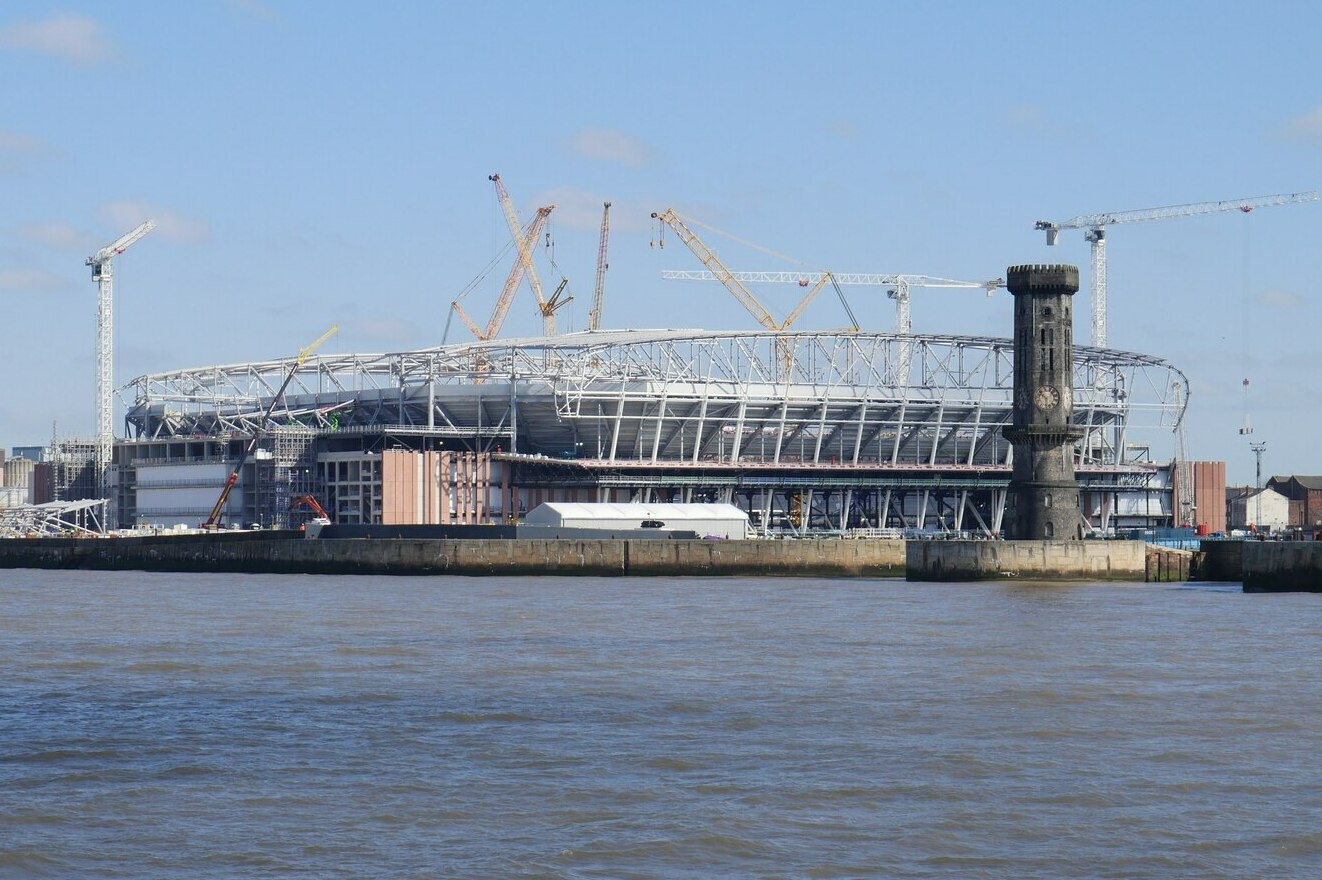
Hill Dickinson Stadium under construction in April 2023 with the Victoria Tower to the right.

In February 2021, Liverpool City Council voted in favour of Everton's £82 million plan to redevelop Goodison Park into a mixed-use scheme featuring 173 homes and 51,000 sq ft (4,700 m^{2}) of offices. The approval followed the green light for the club's new Everton Stadium, which was nearing completion, and was scheduled to be occupied by the summer of 2025. In September 2024 Historic England issued a Certificate of Immunity from Listing, guaranteeing that the stadium and its structures would not be statutorily listed within the next five years. As well as the homes and office space, the outline proposals for the Goodison Park site in Walton included a 63,000 sq ft (5,900 m^{2}) six-storey care home, more than 107,000 sq ft (9,900 m^{2}) of space for community uses, and 8,000 sq ft (740 m^{2}) of retail and leisure space.

Plans to demolish the stadium changed following Everton's 2024 takeover, with the new owners saying the stadium would be "preserved for community use" and a feasibility study was commissioned to determine if the stadium could host the club's women's team.

On 13 May 2025, Everton announced it would no longer pursue a redevelopment of the Goodison Park stadium, instead opting to use the stadium as the home ground for their women's team from the 2025–26 WSL season onwards, making the stadium the largest dedicated women's football stadium in the UK. The transition to becoming a home for the women's team would see the capacity reduced, with the upper tiers of the Gwladys Street End and the Bullens Road stand, as well as the top balcony of the Goodison Road stand being left out of use, instead covered with Everton Women's team branding unless demand for derbies and significant matches cause an opening of stands. Additionally, the number of seats in the remaining parts of the stadium would be reduced to create more space. Five days later, the Everton men's team played their final game at the stadium, securing a 2–0 win over Southampton with a brace from Iliman Ndiaye.

The Everton women's team played their first match at Goodison against Tottenham on 14 September 2025. Tottenham won the match 2–0, with midfielder Olga Ahtinen scoring the stadium's first goal in WSL competition.

On 8 August 2026, the 2026-27 EFL Cup first-round fixture between Preston North End and Huddersfield Town, had to be held at Goodison Park. This was due to the installation of a hybrid pitch at Deepdale not yet being complete. PNE won the match 4-3 on penalties after a 1-1 draw at full time; incidentally, their second-round tie was against Everton at Deepdale on 26 August, a 0-4 loss to the home team.

== Structure ==
Exploded view plan of the present-day layout of Goodison Park

Goodison Park has a total capacity of 39,572 all-seated and comprises four separate stands: the Goodison Road Stand, Gwladys Street Stand, Bullens Road Stand, and the Park End Stand.

=== Goodison Road Stand ===
Built in sections from 1969 to 1971 – replacing the large double-decker 1909 Archibald Leitch–designed stand – the Goodison Road Stand is a double-decker stand with the lower deck being two-tier. Each level is given a separate name. The middle-deck level is known as the Main Stand and is fronted by another seated section known as the Family Enclosure. The Enclosure was originally terracing prior to the advent of all-seater stadia. The Top Balcony is the highest part of the stadium. The stand became all-seater in 1987 and as of 2016 has a capacity of 12,664.

The back wall of the stand cuts into the stand because of the non-square nature of the Goodison Park site. The Goodison Road Stand is also home to the conference and hospitality facilities. On non-match days, Goodison Park holds conferences, weddings, meetings and parties on a daily basis.

=== Bullens Road ===
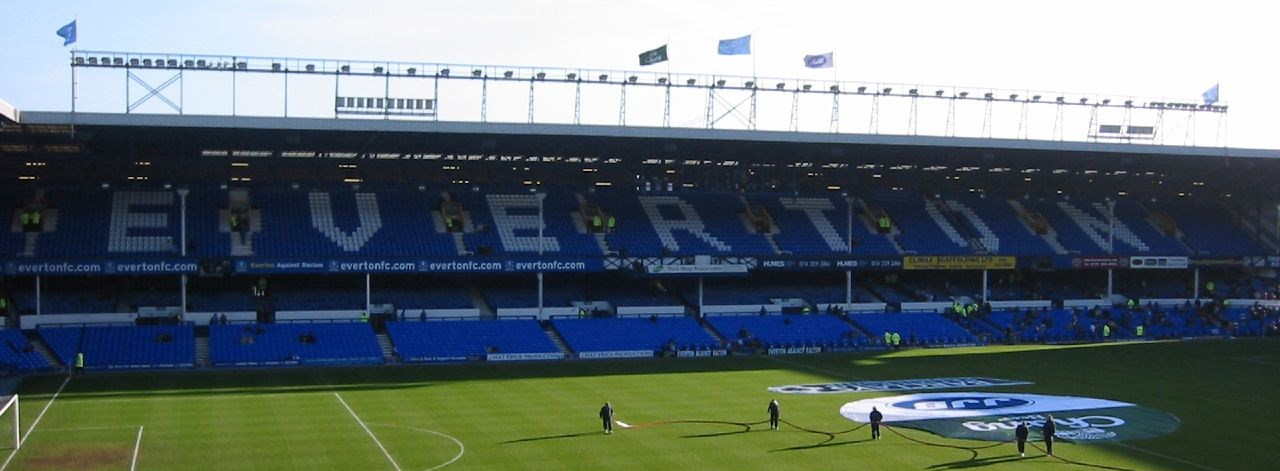
Bullens Road

On the east side of the ground, the Bullens Road stand is divided into the Upper Bullens, Lower Bullens and The Paddock. The rear of the south end of the stand houses away supporters. The north corner of the stand is connected to the Gwladys Street Stand. The current capacity of the stand is 10,546. The stand takes its name from the adjacent Bullens Road. The Upper Bullens is decorated with Archibald Leitch's distinctive truss design.

=== Howard Kendall Gwladys Street End ===
Behind the goal at the north end of Goodison Park, the Gwladys Street Stand is divided into Upper Gwladys and Lower Gwladys. This stand is the "Popular End", holding the most boisterous and vociferous home supporters. It is known colloquially as "The Street End". If Everton win the toss before kick-off the captain traditionally elects to play towards the Gwladys Street End in the second half. The stand has a capacity of 10,611 and gives its name to Gwladys Street's Hall of Fame. In July 2016, the stand was renamed the Howard Kendall Gwladys Street End, in honour of Everton's most successful manager.

=== Sir Philip Carter Park Stand ===
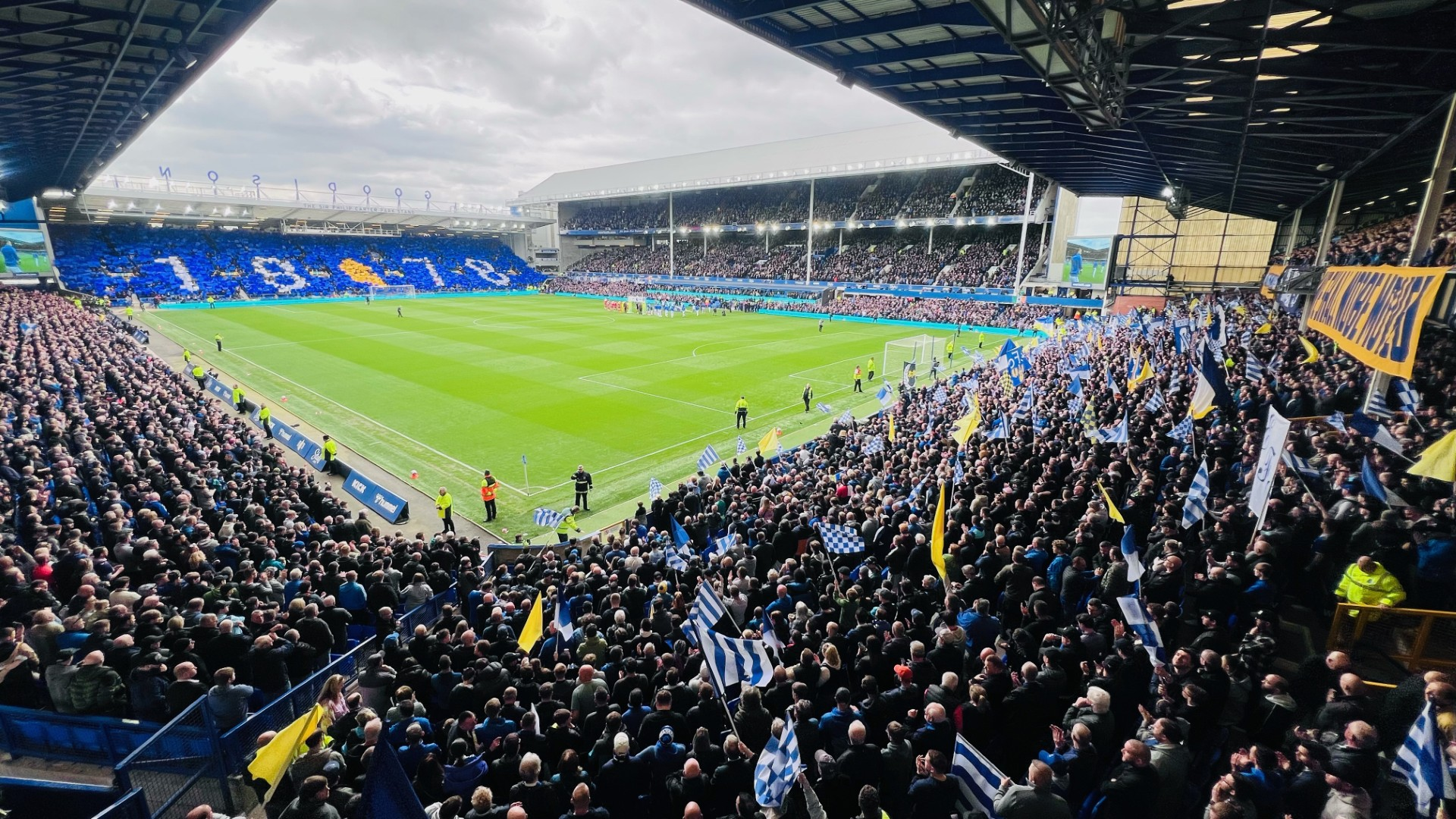
The Park End within the view of the Gwladys Street Stand

At the south end of the ground, behind one goal, the Park End Stand backs onto Walton Lane, which borders Stanley Park. The name of the stand was originally the Stanley Park End but it is commonly referred to as the Park End. The Park End has the smallest capacity at Goodison Park. The current layout of the stand was opened on 17 September 1994, with a capacity of 5,750. It was opened by David Hunt, a Member of Parliament. During the structure's development, fans were able to watch matches by climbing trees in neighbouring Stanley Park.

In the late 1970s and 1980s, the stand accommodated the away fans. Previously, it was open to home supporters. The lower tier of the old stand was terracing and this was closed off by the turn of the 1980s due to it being a fire hazard as the terracing steps were wooden. The front concrete terracing remained and was one of the last standing areas at a Premiership ground. During the 1960s and 1970s, both ends of the ground featured a large arc behind the goals. This was created as a requirement for the 1966 World Cup because the crowd had to be a required distance from the goals.

The area around Goodison Park when built was full of terraced housing, including Goodison Avenue behind the Park End stand. Oddly, housing was built right into the stand itself (as shown on old photographs of Goodison and in programmes). The club had previously owned many of the houses on the street and rented them to players. One of the players to live there, Dixie Dean, later had a statue erected in his honour near the Park End on Walton Lane. By the 1990s, the club had demolished virtually the whole street and this coincided with the redevelopment of the Park End stand. However, at present the majority of the land is now an open car park for the club and its marquee.

In July 2016, the stand was renamed the Sir Philip Carter Park Stand, in honour of the club's former chairman.

=== St Luke's Church ===
Sketch published by Outdoors Magazine in 1892, St. Luke's predecessor – a wooden church structure can be seen behind the corner of the pitch.

Goodison Park is unique in the sense that a church, St Luke's, protrudes into the site between the Goodison Road Stand and the Gwladys Street Stand only yards from the corner flag. Everton do not play early kick-offs on Sundays in order to permit Sunday services at the church. The church is synonymous with the football club and a wooden church structure was in place when Goodison Park was originally built. Former Everton players such as Brian Harris have had their funeral service held there.

The church can be seen from the Park End and Bullens Road and has featured prominently over the years as a backdrop during live televised matches. It is also the home to the Everton Former Players' Foundation of which the Reverend is a trustee.

The church has over the years curtailed development of the ground. Everton did attempt to pay for its removal in order to gain extra space for a larger capacity. One of two jumbotron screens (both installed in 2000) has been installed between the Goodison Road stand and Gwladys Street stand partially obscuring the church from view. The other is situated between the Bullens Road and Park End.

Imaginative spectators would climb the church and watch a football game from the rooftop; however, they have now been deterred from doing so with the installation of security measures such as barbed wire and anti-climb paint. In addition, the introduction of the 'all-seater' ruling following the Taylor Report has meant that spectators no longer resort to climbing nearby buildings for a glimpse of the event as a seat is guaranteed with a purchased ticket.

== Transport ==
Goodison Park is located two miles (3 km) north of Liverpool City Centre. Liverpool Lime Street railway station is the nearest mainline station. The nearest station to the stadium is Kirkdale railway station on the Merseyrail Northern Line which is located just over half a mile (800 m) away. On match days, there is also a shuttle bus service from Sandhills railway station known as "SoccerBus". In 2007, Sandhills underwent a £6 million renovation to help encourage people to use the rail service.

Walton & Anfield railway station, located on Walton Lane (the same road that the Park End backs onto), was the nearest station to Goodison Park until its closure in 1948. Although Everton shifted towards a new stadium away from Goodison Park, it remained a suggestion that the station could be re-opened, should the freight only Canada Dock Branch line once again run passenger trains.

There are on-site parking facilities for supporters (limited to 230 spaces) and the streets surrounding the ground allow parking only for residents with permits. The Car Parking resident parking scheme is operated by Liverpool City Council.

== Records ==
With Goodison Park now closed for men’s football at the end of the 2024–25 season, Everton have played here for all but four of their 122 league seasons in the top tier, giving it the distinction of hosting more top-flight games than any other ground in England for its time. Goodison is the only English club ground to have hosted a FIFA World Cup semi-final. Until the expansion of Old Trafford in 1996, Goodison Park held the record Sunday attendance on a Football League ground (53,509 v West Bromwich Albion, FA Cup, 1974).

Everton won 15 home league games in a row between 4 October 1930 and 4 April 1931. In the 1931–32 season, Goodison Park was the venue of the most goals scored at home in a league season, 84 by Everton. Between 23 April 1984 and 2 September 1986, Everton scored consecutively in 47 games, registering 36 wins and seven draws, scoring 123 goals in the process while conceding 38. Scottish striker Graeme Sharp scored 32 of these goals.

Jack Southworth holds the record for most goals scored in one game at Goodison Park, scoring six versus West Bromwich Albion on 30 December 1893.

The most goals scored in a game at Goodison Park is 12, this occurred in two Everton games: versus Sheffield Wednesday (9–3) on 17 October 1931 and versus Plymouth Argyle (8–4) on 27 February 1954.

== Attendances ==
Average yearly attendance for Goodison Park

Whilst at Goodison Park, the club has had one of the highest average attendances in the country. The stadium has only had six seasons where Everton has not been amongst the top ten highest attendances in the country.

The highest average attendance in the club's history has been 51,603 (1962–63) and the lowest was 13,230 (1892–93) which was recorded in Goodison Park's first year.

The five highest attendances for Everton at Goodison Park are:

Date	Competition	Opposition	Attendance
18 September 1948	Division One	Liverpool	78,299
14 February 1953	FA Cup	Manchester United	77,920
28 August 1954	Division One	Preston North End	76,839
29 January 1958	FA Cup	Blackburn Rovers	75,818
27 December 1954	Division One	Wolverhampton Wanderers	75,322

The five lowest attendances for Everton at Goodison Park are:

Date	Competition	Opposition	Attendance
20 December 1988	Simod Cup	Millwall	3,703
1 October 1991	Zenith Data Systems Cup	Oldham	4,588
22 January 1991	Zenith Data Systems Cup	Sunderland	4,609
16 February 1988	Simod Cup	Luton	5,204
28 February 1989	Simod Cup	Q.P.R.	7,072

== Other uses ==
Despite being purposefully built for Everton to play football, Goodison Park has hosted many other types of events.

=== Goodison Park as host stadium for football ===
Goodison Park became the first Football League ground to hold an FA Cup Final, in 1894. Notts County beat Bolton Wanderers, watched by crowd of 37,000. An FA Cup final replay was staged in 1910 with Newcastle United beating Barnsley 2–0.

On 27 December 1920, Goodison Park hosted a match between Dick, Kerr's Ladies & St Helens Ladies, which was attended by an estimated 53,000 people, at a time when the average gate at Goodison Park in 1919–20 was near 29,000. Dick, Kerr's Ladies won 4–0. More than £3,000 was raised for charity. Shortly after, the Football Association banned women's football on official pitches. The reasons given by the FA were not substantial and it is perceived by some that the women's teams were a threat to the men's game. The ban was lifted in 1970.

During the Second World War, Goodison Park was chosen as a host venue for the "Football League – Northern Section".

In 1949, Goodison Park became the site of England's first ever defeat on English soil by a non-Home Nations country, namely the Republic of Ireland. The ground hosted five matches including a semi-final for the 1966 FIFA World Cup. In April 1895, Goodison Park hosted England versus Scotland and so Everton became the first club to host England internationals on two grounds (the other being Anfield in 1889 when England won 6–2 versus Ireland). The city of Liverpool also became the first English city to stage England games at three different venues, the other being Aigburth Cricket Club.

In 1973, Goodison hosted Northern Ireland's home games against Wales and England.

==== 1966 FIFA World Cup ====
Goodison Park hosted five games during the 1966 FIFA World Cup. The original schedule of the 1966 World Cup meant that if England won their group and then reached the semi-final, the match would be held at Goodison Park. However, the organising committee were allowed to swap the venues, with England playing Portugal at Wembley.

===== Group stage =====
12 July 1966	Brazil	2–0	Bulgaria	Goodison Park, Liverpool
19:30	Pelé 15'; Garrincha 63'	(Report)		Attendance: 48,000; Referee: Kurt Tschenscher (West Germany)

15 July 1966	Hungary	3–1	Brazil	Goodison Park, Liverpool
19:30	Bene 2'; Farkas 64'; Mészöly 73' (pen.)	(Report)	Tostão 14'	Attendance: 52,000; Referee: Ken Dagnall (England)

19 July 1966	Portugal	3–1	Brazil	Goodison Park, Liverpool
19:30	Simöes 15'; Eusébio 27', 85'	(Report)	Rildo 70'	Attendance: 62,000; Referee: George McCabe (England)

===== Quarter-finals =====
23 July 1966	Portugal	5–3	North Korea	Goodison Park, Liverpool
15:00	Eusébio 27', 43' (pen.), 56', 59' (pen.); José Augusto 80'	(Report)	Pak Seung-Zin 1'; Lee Dong-Woon 22'; Yang Sung-Kook 25'	Attendance: 51,780; Referee: Menachem Ashkenazi (Israel)

===== Semi-finals =====
25 July 1966	West Germany	2–1	Soviet Union	Goodison Park, Liverpool
19:30	Haller 42'; Beckenbauer 67'	(Report)	Porkujan 88'	Attendance: 39,840; Referee: Concetto Lo Bello (Italy)

Portugal's Eusébio won the tournament's Golden Boot scoring nine goals, six of them at Goodison Park. Eusébio later stated that "Goodison Park is for me the best stadium in my life". In Garrincha's 50 caps for Brazil, the only defeat he experienced was in the game versus Hungary at Goodison Park.

==== FA Cup Final ====
Two years after construction, Goodison Park was chosen by the Football Association to host the final of the FA Cup.

Year	Attendance	Winner		Runner-up		Details
31 March 1894	37,000	Notts County	4	Bolton Wanderers	1	

==== British Home championships ====
===== England =====
Goodison Park has played host to England on eight occasions during the Home Championships. When Everton player Alex Stevenson scored for Ireland in the 1935 British Home Championship versus England, he became the first player to score an international away goal on his club's home ground.

Date	"Home" Team		"Away" Team		Details
6 April 1895	England	3	Scotland	0	
16 February 1907	England	1	Ireland	0	
1 April 1911	England	1	Scotland	1	
22 October 1924	England	3	Ireland	0	
22 October 1928	England	2	Ireland	1	
6 February 1935	England	2	Ireland	1	
5 November 1947	England	2	Ireland	2	
11 November 1953	England	3	Northern Ireland	1	

===== Northern Ireland =====
On 22 February 1973 the Irish Football Association announced that Northern Ireland's home matches in the 1973 British Home Championship would be moved to Goodison Park due to the civil unrest within Belfast at that time.

Date	"Home" Team		"Away" Team	
12 May 1973	Northern Ireland	1	England	2
19 May 1973	Northern Ireland	1	Wales	0

Both Northern Ireland goalscorers Dave Clements (vs. England) and Bryan Hamilton (vs. Wales) went on to play for Everton later on in their careers.

==== Other neutral matches at Goodison Park ====
Date	Competition	"Home" Team		"Away" Team		Details
21 April 1894	Inter-League Match	Football League XI	1	Scottish League XI	1	
21 March 1896	FA Cup semi-final	Bolton Wanderers	1	Sheffield Wednesday	1	
11 April 1896	Inter League Match	Football League XI	5	Scottish League XI	1	
21 March 1903	FA Cup semi-final	Bury	3	Aston Villa	0	
13 March 1904	FA Cup semi-final	Manchester City	3	Sheffield Wednesday	0	
28 April 1910	FA Cup Final (Replay)	Newcastle United	2	Barnsley	0	
1 April 1914	FA Cup semi-final replay	Burnley	1	Sheffield United	0	
14 March 1925	Inter-League Match	Football League XI	4	Scottish League XI	3	
26 March 1928	FA Cup semi-final replay	Huddersfield Town	0	Sheffield United	0	
25 September 1929	Inter-League Match	Football League XI	7	Irish League XI	2	
3 December 1934	FA Cup 1st round, 2nd replay	New Brighton	2	Southport	1	
11 May 1935 (Note: This was one of two matches which trialled having two referees in a single match. The other trial was on 8 May 1935 when the Football League team beat West Bromwich Albion 9–6 at The Hawthorns.)	Inter-League Match	Football League XI	10	Welsh Football League/Irish league XI	2	
21 October 1936	Inter-League Match	Football League XI	2	Scottish League XI	0	
4 November 1939 (Note: The game took place to aid the Red Cross fund.)	Representative Match	Football League XI	3	All British XI	3	
19 February 1947	Inter-League Match	Football League XI	4	Irish League XI	2	
24 January 1948 (Note: Due to war damage, Old Trafford was closed at the time, and Manchester United were playing their home matches at Maine Road. However, on the same day, Manchester City were at home to Chelsea in another FA Cup tie and as a result this tie was switched to Goodison Park.)	FA Cup 4th round	Manchester United (home team)	3	Liverpool	0	
2 April 1949	FA Cup semi-final replay	Wolverhampton Wanderers	1	Manchester United	0	
21 September 1949 (Note: This was the first time that England had been beaten at home by a team from outside the Home Nations.)	Friendly International	England	0	Republic of Ireland	2	
14 March 1951	FA Cup semi-final replay	Blackpool	2	Birmingham City	1	
19 May 1951	Friendly International	England	5	Portugal	2	
10 October 1951	Inter-League Match	Football League XI	9	League of Ireland XI	1	
7 December 1955	Inter-League Match	Football League XI	5	League of Ireland XI	1	
15 January 1958	U23 International	England U23	3	Scotland U23	1	
23 September 1959	U23 International	England U23	0	Hungary U23	1	
8 February 1961	U23 International	England U23	2	Wales U23	0	
17 August 1963	FA Charity Shield	Everton	4	Manchester United	0	
5 January 1966 (Note: England's goal was scored by Bobby Moore. This was his first international goal and the only one on English soil. Ray Wilson was chosen to play in this game, he is therefore the last Everton player to play for England at Goodison Park.)	Friendly International	England	1	Poland	1	
13 August 1966	FA Charity Shield	Everton	0	Liverpool	1	
1 May 1968	U23 International	England U23	4	Hungary U23	0	
30 November 1970	FA Cup 1st round, 2nd replay	Tranmere Rovers	0	Scunthorpe United	1	
19 April 1972	FA Cup semi-final replay	Arsenal	2	Stoke City	1	
18 March 1974 (Note: Due to a pitch invasion at the original match (which Newcastle United won 4–3), The FA ordered the tie to be replayed at a neutral venue.)	FA Cup 6th round replay	Newcastle United	0	Nottingham Forest	0	
21 March 1974	FA Cup 6th round, 2nd replay	Nottingham Forest	0	Newcastle United	1	
4 April 1979	FA Cup semi-final replay	Manchester United	1	Liverpool	0	
17 May 1983	UEFA U18 Championship Finals Group A	West Germany U18	3	Bulgaria U18	1	
13 April 1985	FA Cup semi-final	Manchester United	2	Liverpool	2	
6 April 1989	U18 International	England U18	0	Switzerland U18	0	
17 January 1991	FA Cup 3rd Round	Woking (home team)	0	Everton	1	
13 November 1993	FA Cup 1st round	Knowsley United	1	Carlisle United	4	
6 June 1995	Umbro Cup	Brazil	3	Japan	0	
9 September 2003	UEFA U21 Championship Qualifying	England U21	1	Portugal U21	1	
8 August 2026	EFL Cup 1st round, Northern section	Preston North End	1 (4)	Huddersfield Town	1 (3)	

=== Non-football usage ===
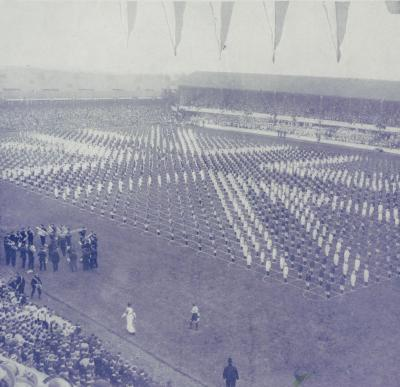
Men in dark blue and white suits stand across the pitch in formation, creating the image of a Union Flag. 80,000 people attended Goodison Park to see King George V.

On 11 July 1913, Goodison Park became the first English football ground to be visited by a reigning monarch when King George V and Queen Mary attended. The attending royals had opened Gladstone Dock on the same day. A tablet was unveiled in the Main Stand to mark the occasion. During the First World War, Goodison frequently hosted Territorial Army training drill sessions.

On 19 May 1938, George VI and Queen Elizabeth attended Goodison Park to present new colours to the 5th Battalion the King's Regiment (Liverpool) and the Liverpool Scottish (Queens Own Cameron Highlanders) in front of 80,000 spectators.

In 1921, Goodison Park played host to Lancashire's rugby league team when they took on Australia national rugby league team and lost 29–6. Goodison Park was chosen as one of two English venues for the Sox-Giants 1924 World Tour. On 23 October 1924, 2,000 spectators witnessed US baseball teams Chicago White Sox and New York Giants participate in an exhibition match. One player managed to hit a ball clear over the large Goodison Road Stand. The other English venue selected was Stamford Bridge.

In September 1939, Goodison Park was commandeered by military, the club's minutes read: "The Chairman reported that our ground has been commandeered as an anti-aircraft (Balloon Barrage section), post." During World War Two, an American forces baseball league was based at Goodison Park. In addition, a baseball game between two Army Air Force nines watched by over 8,000 spectators raised over $3,000 for British Red Cross and St. John's Ambulance fund.

The Liverpool Trojans and Formby Cardinals were the last two teams to play baseball at Goodison Park. This was in the Lancashire Cup Final in 1948.

Goodison Park is used as a venue for weddings. More than 800 fans' ashes have been buried at Goodison Park and since 2004 the club have had to reject further requests because there is no room for any more. Tommy Lawton wanted his ashes to be scattered at Goodison but his son chose to donate them to the national football museum because of Goodison's uncertain future.

Goodison Park was also the venue for the boxing match between "Pretty" Ricky Conlan (played by native Evertonian and Everton fan Tony Bellew) and Adonis Creed (Michael B. Jordan) in the 2015 film Creed. The stadium hosted the first outdoor boxing event in Liverpool since 1949 when Bellew defeated Ilunga Makabu on 29 May 2016 to claim the vacant WBC Cruiserweight title.

==== Rugby League at Goodison Park ====
Between 1908 and 1921, Goodison Park also played host to four rugby league Kangaroo Tour matches involving the Australian and Australasian teams from 1908 to 1921.

Game	Date	Host team	Result	Touring team	Attendance	Tour
1	18 November 1908	Northern Union XIII	9–10	Australia	6,000	1908–09 Kangaroo tour of Great Britain
2	3 March 1909	Northern Union XIII	14–7	Australia	4,500	1908–09 Kangaroo tour of Great Britain
3	25 October 1911	Northern League XIII	3–16	Australasia	6,000	1911–12 Kangaroo tour of Great Britain
4	30 November 1921	Lancashire	6–29	Australasia	17,000	1921–22 Kangaroo tour of Great Britain

== Footnotes ==
Preceded by Anfield	Home of Everton; 1892 – 2025	Succeeded by Hill Dickinson Stadium (Men's First Team)
Preceded by Fallowfield Stadium	Host of the FA Cup Final; 1894	Succeeded by Crystal Palace
Preceded by Crystal Palace	Host of the FA Cup Final replay 1910	Succeeded by Crystal Palace
