= George Mahon =

George Mahon may refer to:

- George H. Mahon (1900–1985), U.S. Representative from Texas
- George Mahon (Everton F.C. chairman) (1853–1908), former chairman of Everton Football Club
