= Everton Former Players' Foundation =

English charitable organisation

Everton Former Player's Foundation
- Formation: 1999 (Established 26 years)
- Legal status: Registered Charity
- Region served: Former Everton F.C. players
- Chairman: Henry Mooney
- Affiliations: European Former Players Foundation
- Website: www.evertonfpf.org
- Remarks: contact: p.labone 0151 677 5737

The Everton Former Players' Foundation is a registered charity based in Moreton, England. The Foundation raises money for the physical and pastoral care of former football players who have previously been contracted to Everton.

Money is raised for the charity through the following main sources:

- A testimonial game for a former player, the usual arrangement being that the Foundation receive 50% of the proceeds.
- A Foundation day at which the Foundation raises money through raffles in the lounges at Goodison Park.
- Regular raffles before each home game at Goodison Park.
- Dinners and social functions throughout the year at which former players normally attend and speak to the guests.

== Patrons ==
The Patrons of the charity are:

- Duncan McKenzie - Former player
- Graeme Sharp - Former player
- Barry Horne - Former player
- Bill Kenwright - Everton F.C. Chairman
- David France - Founder
- Alan Stubbs - Former player
- Joe Royle - Former player and manager
- Derek Temple - Former player
- Tony Bellew - Former boxer, WBC cruiserweight champion
