= David France =

Author, football historian and philanthropist

David France OBE
- Born: David Harry France; 30 June 1948 (age 78); Widnes
- Occupations: Retired oil & gas industry executive, Author
- Spouse: Elizabeth France
- Writing career
- Genre: Sport
- Subject: Everton Football Club

David Harry France, OBE (born 30 June 1948) is an author, football historian and philanthropist. Throughout the past three decades, he has been the driving force behind numerous initiatives related to Everton Football Club including Gwladys Street's Hall of Fame, the Everton Former Players' Foundation, the EFC Heritage Society, the Everton War Memorials, the Founding Fathers of Merseyside Football and the David France Collection (now known as the Everton Collection). In January 2011, Liverpool's Freedom of the City panel rewarded David France with the prestigious title of Citizen of Honour.

France was appointed Officer of the Order of the British Empire (OBE) in the 2012 New Year Honours for services to football in the United Kingdom and Europe.

== Background ==
France was born in Widnes, Lancashire (now Cheshire). Educated in the United Kingdom, the United States and Germany (BSc, MSc, MBA, PhD), he moved to North America in 1978 and worked in the nuclear and space industries before joining the executive of an oil & gas corporation. He retired from corporate life in 1990 to concentrate on consulting and charity work. Although based in Texas, he travelled in excess of 2 million miles supporting the club and his Everton initiatives. Known as ‘Dr Everton’, he was appointed Life President of the Everton Shareholders’ Association. In a 2009 website poll involving eight candidates, he came a close second to manager David Moyes as the person who Everton fans trust the most. The results were David Moyes 35%, David France 34%, Bill Kenwright 19%.

== Everton books ==
France has written 19 books to tell the Everton story. Some involved collaborations with David Prentice, Becky Tallentire, Barry Hewitt and cartoonist Peter King, while others embraced inputs from a cross-section of Everton enthusiasts. The profits from these books were donated to Merseyside charities.

- Toffee Cards – The Tobacco Years (1997) ISBN 1-874799-05-9
- Toffee Pages – The Post-War Years (1997) ISBN 1-874799-06-7
- Gwladys Street's Hall of Fame (1998) ISBN 1-874799-09-1
- Gwladys Street's Hall of Fame Edition 2 (1999) ISBN 1-874799-10-5
- Gwladys Street's Hall of Fame Edition 3 (1999) ISBN 1-874799-12-1
- Gwladys Street's Holy Trinity (with Becky Tallentire 2001) ISBN 1-874799-14-8
- Gwladys Street's Big Book for Kids of All Ages (with Peter King 2002) ISBN 1-874799-15-6
- Gwladys Street's Blue Book (with David Prentice 2002) ISBN 1-874799-16-4
- Virgin Blues (with David Prentice 2003) ISBN 1-874799-17-2
- Toffee Cards – The Bubble Gum Years (with Barry Hewitt 2005) ISBN 1-874799-18-0
- Moyesiah (2006) ISBN 1-874799-19-9
- Evertonians Eat Scouse (2006) ISBN 1-874799-19-9
- Everton Treasures – The David France Collection (with David Prentice 2007) ISBN 1-874799-20-2
- Dr Everton's Magnificent Obsession (with David Prentice 2008) ISBN 978-1-905266-79-1
- Alex Young – The Golden Vision (2008) ISBN 978-1-874799-21-4
- Everton Crazy - Sixty Seasons, Two Million Miles (2016) ISBN 978-1-909245-46-4
- Everton Proud (2016) ISBN 978-1-909245-52-5
- Blue Dragon - The Roy Vernon Story (with Rob Sawyer 2019) ISBN 978-1-9162784-0-0
- Toffee Soccer - Everton and North America (with Rob Sawyer and Darren Griffiths 2021) ISBN 978-1-9162784-0-0

== Gwladys Street's Hall of Fame ==
Conceived by France after consultation with baseball's counterpart in Cooperstown, New York, it pays tribute to the men who have contributed to Everton's history. In 1996 he recruited an independent panel of players, journalists, shareholders and season-ticket holders to painstakingly assess the qualifications of the 800 or so candidates and select the initial 75 members. Subsequent additions have been elected by Everton supporters via postal and internet ballots. The Hall of Fame inductions were celebrated passionately in 1998 and every subsequent year at Liverpool's Adelphi Hotel. Known locally as the "Nuremberg Rallies of Football", never before had any club's supporters interacted intimately with heroes who had won the World Cup, European silverware, FA Cups and League titles. The 2009 inductions of Duncan Ferguson and Bill Kenwright brought the total to 126 members. The 2017 additions of John Bailey, Kevin Campbell, Nigel Martyn, Ian Snodin and Pat van den Hauwe increased the membership to 131.

== The Everton Former-Players' Foundation ==
France registered the Everton Former-Players’ Foundation (Charity No 1080101) to alleviate their medical and other hardships of old footballers in 1999. With the support of the Professional Footballer's Association and the generosity Everton Football Club and its supporters, the EFPF has raised and spent over £100,000 per year during the past 10 years assisting individuals with knee and hip surgeries and even home improvements. All grants are confidential but any player who made one first-team appearance for Everton is eligible for help. The EFPF is the first of its kind in the football world and, under the current stewardship of Rev. Harry Ross and Laurence Lee, is considered to be the UEFA model. Subsequently, Real Madrid, Barcelona and Bayern Munich have established similar organisations and along with Everton are members of the European Former Players' Association.

== The David France Collection of Everton memorabilia ==
The David France Collection comprises memorabilia relating to the history and development of Everton Football Club.[22] France assembled the collection over 20 years, acquiring items dating from the club’s early years at Stanley Park. It includes extended sequences of match programmes and other material documenting Everton and football on Merseyside. The collection also contains the club’s official ledgers, including minutes of board meetings from 1886 to 1964 and records concerning the split that led to the formation of Liverpool Football Club.[23][24]

Poor health influenced Dr. France's decision in 2001 to find a secure and long-term home for his collection. Despite receiving offers from private investors, he was committed to make the collection available to the people of Merseyside. Six years later, the Everton Collection Charitable Trust (Charity No 1109480) announced that it had secured a grant from the UK Heritage Lottery Fund to acquire his collection, now named The Everton Collection. Subsequently, France donated the priceless ledgers and transferred the other treasures at a heavily discounted price. There were, however, a few conditions to the transaction. Every piece of memorabilia had to be professionally catalogued, preserved by experts and secured in a vault. No items can be disposed of and the collection had to be augmented with quality acquisitions when they become available. Equally as important, the items should be displayed physically in Liverpool and all printed materials digitised and incorporated into a website to facilitate worldwide access. Subsequently, Everton Football Club donated its archives.

Now known as The Everton Collection, it is housed at the Liverpool Record Office where it took a team of experts some 15 months to catalogue the artefacts. Highlights of the collection are featured in two books ‘Everton Treasures’ and ‘Dr Everton’s Magnificent Obsession’. Some of the Everton Collection has been digitised and is available online at www.evertoncollection.org.uk. At the formal launch the Everlution exhibition in late 2009, Andy Burnham, the UK Health Minister, said: "Thanks to David France the story of the heart and soul of our club has been brought together. We all owe him a huge debt of thanks for the passion and the meticulousness with which he has prepared this wonderful collection." Items from the collection will be on display at the Liverpool Central Library until mid-2010.

The collection has been lauded by other Everton fans and experts alike. Everton chairman Bill Kenwright said: ‘On behalf of all Evertonians, I would like to express our collective gratitude to David France for his foresight in acquiring these rarities and for his patience during the fund-raising period.’ Sir Philip Carter added: ‘There are so many sacred items spanning the 131 years from our days at Stanley Park. The treasure trove contained our first programmes, first photographs, first medals, first season-tickets, first contracts as well as the club ledgers circa 1886. Everything is in pristine condition.’ Technical experts offered similar appreciation: Janet Dugdale of the National Museums Liverpool reported: ‘The collection’s importance is increased by its integrity as a collection which has been amassed with a single-minded sense of purpose and intellectual rigour to which many museums aspire.’ Graham Budd of Sotheby's added: ‘The collection offers an extraordinary record of the evolution of British football and of the city of Liverpool. It has no match anywhere.’

== The Founding Fathers of Merseyside Football ==
Because there had been no recognition at Goodison or Anfield of the men who started and shaped football on Merseyside, Dr. France commissioned artist Wasan Suttikasem to produce six oil paintings depicting the key figures from the early days of Everton and Liverpool. Known as 'The Founding Fathers of Merseyside Football', The subjects are Rev. Ben Swift Chambers, John Houlding, Dr. James Baxter, George Mahon, John McKenna and Will Cuff. The portraits are owned by the Everton Shareholders' Association and will be rotated between different venues throughout the United Kingdom so that all football can celebrate the roots of Merseyside football.
