= John Houlding =

English businessman (1833–1902)

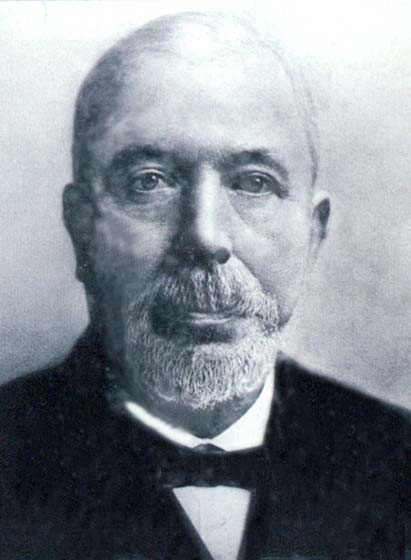

Lord Mayor of Liverpool
- In office 1897–1898
- Preceded by: Thomas Hughes
- Succeeded by: William Oulton

Personal details
- Born: c. August 1833
- Died: 17 March 1902 (aged 68) Cimiez, Nice, France
- Party: Conservative
- Education: Liverpool College
- Occupation: Businessman, politician
- Known for: Founding Liverpool F.C.

John Houlding (c. August 1833 – 17 March 1902) was an English businessman and local politician, most notable for being the founder of Liverpool Football Club and later Lord Mayor of Liverpool. Formerly he was Everton FC Club President and member.

In November 2017, Houlding was commemorated with a bronze bust outside Anfield to mark the 125th anniversary of Liverpool F.C.

== Biography ==
Houlding was a businessman in the city of Liverpool. He was educated at Liverpool College and was active towards the end of the 19th century, owning a brewery that left him in a comfortable financial state for the rest of his life. He was elected to the Liverpool City Council as a Conservative representing the Everton ward, before being appointed Lord Mayor of Liverpool in 1897. He was also a member of the Orange Order, a Protestant fraternal organisation that had a large following in the Liverpool area that operated under the Grand Orange Lodge of England. Houlding was also a freemason and founded Anfield Lodge No. 2215, he also attended Everton Lodge No. 823 and Hamer Lodge No. 1395. He was Provincial Senior Grand Warden in West Lancashire and, in 1897, was appointed Senior Grand Deacon. Houlding also attained the 33° of the Ancient and Accepted Scottish Rite.

=== Anfield Road prior to Liverpool F.C. ===
Prior to his election Houlding was involved with the city's first professional football team, Everton F.C. as their president. In 1882, a ruling forced Everton to play their games at an enclosed ground, having previously played them on the public Stanley Park. A meeting held in the Sandon Hotel in Anfield, Liverpool, owned by Houlding, led to Everton F.C. renting a field off Priory Road. When the owner of this field eventually asked them to leave, Houlding secured a new pitch at Anfield Road, paying a small rent to John Orrell, a fellow brewer.

At Anfield stands were erected, attendance reached 8,000 per game, and Everton became a founding member of the Football League in 1888. However, Houlding was beginning to annoy his fellow members; he increased the rate of interest on his loan to the club following works he had undertaken to the ground, and the players were forced to use the Sandon Hotel in Oakfield Road for changing, both before and after games.

Houlding purchased the land at Anfield Road from Orrell in 1885, developed it and charged rent to Everton. Orrell owned land next to the ground and planned to build an access road across Houlding's land. The only way to stop this was to rent Orrell's land or buy it. Houlding wanted Everton to buy his land and Orrell's land by floating the club. If his proposals had been accepted, Houlding would have made a lot of money from the purchase of the land and the club would have been run by a small number of large shareholders.

Many of the club's members accused Houlding of trying to make a profit at the club's expense. The club's 279 members met in January 1892 to discuss the matter. Following another meeting on 15 March 1892, the club decided to leave Anfield and find a new ground and with Houlding no longer club president. Later that year Everton moved to Goodison Park, on the north side of Stanley Park.

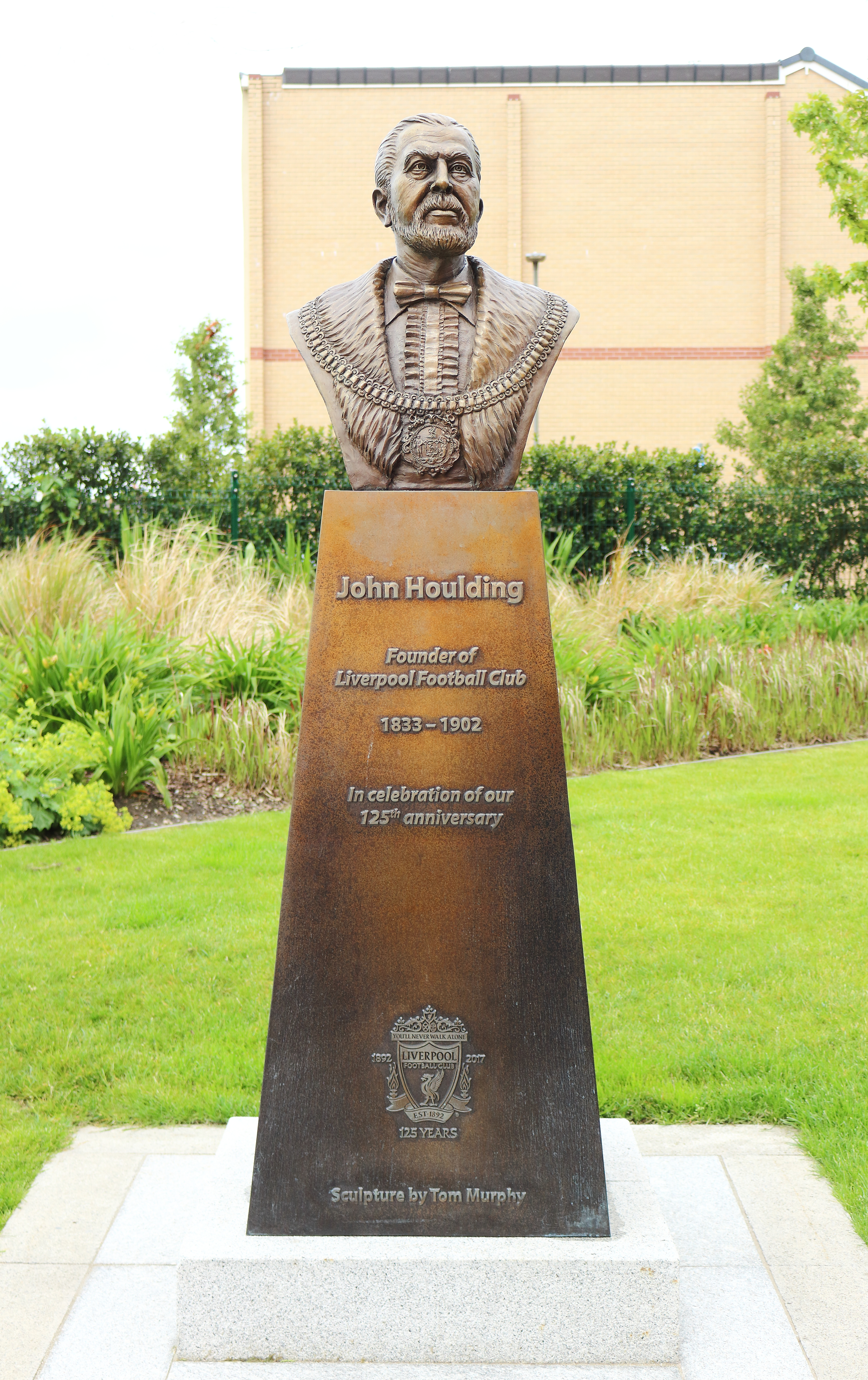
Memorial to Houlding outside Anfield on the 125th anniversary of Liverpool F.C.

=== Founding of Liverpool F.C. ===
After Everton's departure, Houlding and Orrell were left with an empty football ground, and Houlding felt that the only proper course of action would be to found a new football club, which he duly did, signing the contract in the same Sandon Hotel owned by Houlding. The new club was called Everton Athletic but the Football Association would not allow this name to be used due to its similarity to Everton FC, so the new club was renamed Liverpool F.C. The first ever Liverpool F.C. game was a friendly match with Rotherham Town, then of the Midland League, on 1 September 1892.

Having founded the club in 1892, Houlding remained chairman of Liverpool F.C. until 1902. Under its first manager John McKenna, the team won the Lancashire League in its debut season and joined the Football League Second Division at the start of the 1893–94 season. After the club was promoted to the First Division in 1896, Tom Watson was appointed manager, and he led Liverpool to its first league title in 1901.

=== Death and legacy ===
Houlding died following a lengthy illness in 1902 in Cimiez, a neighbourhood of Nice, France, at the age of 68. At his funeral, players of both Liverpool and Everton carried his coffin as a mark of respect for all he had done for football in the city. In November 2017, Houlding was officially commemorated with a bronze bust, which stands at just under 7 feet, outside Anfield, to mark the 125th anniversary of Liverpool F.C. Growing interest in the legacy of John Houlding led to a biography being published by historian David Kennedy in 2022. In 2024, a mural dedicated to Houlding was painted on the side of the Sandon Hotel & Pub outside Anfield stadium, the same pub where Liverpool F.C. was founded. The mural was commissioned by Sandon owner Kate Stewart, who said, "As a local girl and local entrepreneur, he's someone for us to look up to. He’s left the most amazing legacy."

== See also ==
- Founding Fathers of Merseyside Football
