= James Clement Baxter =

British politician

Personal details
- Born: 1 July 1857 Liverpool, Lancashire, England
- Died: 27 January 1928 (aged 70) Liverpool, Lancashire, England
- Party: Liberal
- Education: St. Francis Xavier's College (Liverpool)
- Alma mater: Royal College of Physicians of Ireland
- Profession: Politician, football club chairman, physician

James Clement Baxter (1 July 1857 – 27 January 1928) was an English politician and football club chairman, and doctor of medicine. Baxter represented the Liberal Party on Liverpool City Council between the years of 1906 and 1920 and was the chairman of Everton F.C.

James Clement Baxter was born in Liverpool, Lancashire, England, on 1 July 1857. He was baptised at St. Francis Xavier Roman Catholic Church on 2 August 1857. His father, William Baxter, was originally from Clitheroe and his mother, Ann Hughes, was from Liverpool. His father was Church of England and his mother was Roman Catholic. His father was a chemist and druggist in Great Homer Street Everton, Liverpool. His mother's father, James Hughes, was from Ireland.

Baxter was a Licentiate of the King and Queen's College of Physicians in Ireland, renamed Royal College of Physicians of Ireland from 1890 when, under charter of Queen Victoria, it adopted the present title. According to college records he was admitted on 13 December 1878. He had received his medical training at the Liverpool Royal Infirmary and, presumably, made the short journey to Dublin just to sit the examination (as many English doctors did). After qualifying as a doctor he set up a practice in Robson Street Liverpool.

Baxter was initially a medical adviser for Everton F.C. and later he reluctantly became the club's chairman. In 1892 he advanced the club a loan of £1000 to develop Goodison Park.
