= Stanley Park Stadium =

Proposed stadium in Liverpool, England

Coordinates: 53.4339807°N 2.9596138°W

- Artist's impression of HKS' Stanley Park Stadium
- Interactive map of Stanley Park Stadium
- Full name: Stanley Park Stadium
- Location: Stanley Park, Liverpool, Merseyside, England
- Owner: Fenway Sports Group
- Operator: Liverpool F.C.
- Capacity: 60,000 expandable to 73,000 (all-seater)
- Surface: Desso GrassMaster

Construction
- Built: Cancelled
- Opened: 2006 (planned)
- Cost: £400 million
- Architect: HKS, Inc.
- Project managers: KUD International with Davis Langdon, An AECOM Company
- Structural engineer: Ramboll Whitbybird
- General contractor: Laing O'Rourke

Stanley Park was a proposed football stadium in Stanley Park, Liverpool. If built, it would have become home to the Liverpool Football Club. It would have replaced their current stadium at Anfield. The stadium had a planned capacity of 60,000 all-seated. It was also potentially expandable to 73,000 or more.

There were two designs that were given planning permission. One was designed by architects AFL with a capacity of 60,000, the second was a more expensive futuristic design by Dallas-based architects HKS, which would originally seat 60,000 with a capacity for further expansion to 73,000.

As of January 2012, only small site preparation work had been completed. A change in owners resulted in the plans for Stanley Park Stadium being reexamined. In October 2012, new owners Fenway Sports Group announced their decision to redevelop and expand the current club stadium Anfield (in a similar way that they redeveloped Fenway Park for the Boston Red Sox) rather than proceed with the planned new stadium.

== Stadium ==
The stadium was initially scheduled to open in 2006 with a capacity of approximately 55,000 seats. This was designed by Manchester-based architects AFL. A subsequent redesign of this stadium brought the capacity to 60,000, and planning permission was granted for this in 2003. Construction on this never progressed past the ground works due to a lack of funds.

Under the ownership of Tom Hicks and George Gillette, Dallas-based architects HKS were asked to present a plan for a 60,000 seater stadium that could be easily expandable to over 73,000 in the future. They came up with a futuristic design with an 18,500 seater single tier kop. The design was estimated to cost £400m, and the club was granted planning permission for this stadium. Work never started on this as the owners Hicks and Gillette couldn't raise the funds.

In January 2008, AFL presented Liverpool FC with another redesign of their 60,000 capacity stadium. This was dubbed "New Generation Anfield" and would seat 73,000 with 18,500 in a single tiered kop, similar to the HKS capacity. The stadium would also include two Wembley-style arches. It would cost £290m to build. Planning permission has not been sought for this project however.

In January 2012, the Telegraph reported that the new club owners Fenway Sports Group had decided to ditch the HKS design on the basis of cost and practicality and focus on working with AFL's "First Generation Anfield" plans. They would modernise the now decade-old design, and include a single tiered kop. It was thought that at least £150m in sponsorship money would have had to have been raised before construction could begin. The current owners announced the expansion of Liverpool's current stadium. Work began on the project in 2015.

== History ==
Liverpool F.C. were approached by Liverpool City Council to become a tenant on the flagship King's Dock project. The club however rejected the offer because the site would only be suitable for a 50,000 capacity stadium. At the same time, Merseyside rivals Everton F.C. informally inquired about building on North West section of Stanley Park, Liverpool but were deterred when told that a Victorian covenant was in place. Liverpool's then CEO, Rick Parry threatened to move Liverpool into a neighbouring borough on Merseyside because the only other site he considered viable was to become a residential estate in Garston. The City Council then offered Everton F.C. the opportunity to become tenants of King's Dock. Everton agreed to this as they would only need to raise £30million for a 55,000 capacity stadium and the rest would be paid for with public money by the council.

Sensing an opportunity, former chief executive Rick Parry told Liverpool City Council that Liverpool F.C. wanted to build on the South East area of Stanley Park and that they were considering leaving the city boundaries and taking millions of pounds of income that would usually be paid to the council with them. The City Council reluctantly agreed to Parry's demands and Parry told the press that the solution was "under our noses all along". At the time, Everton chairman, Bill Kenwright chose not to contest the reasoning because they were being given financial support from the public sector. Plans to build on Stanley Park were resisted by local residents and Friends of Stanley Park who did not want to lose parkland for a football stadium.

The stadium designed by AFL was given planning permission in February 2003. Construction was expected to be finished in 2006.

=== Hicks & Gillett Era ===
In February 2007 the club was bought by American owners Tom Hicks and George Gillett Jr. The new owners stated that a new stadium was a priority and that work would begin soon. However the pair failed to secure funding for the stadium, and the AFL plans were replaced by newer and more expensive HKS ones. The HKS stadium was given final planning permission on 19 June 2008 and minor site preparation began on 24 June 2008.

On 15 May, Carlsberg stated their interest in a sponsorship deal of the stadium name, proposing Carlsberg Anfield. No official deal was signed however, and thus no major financial backing was secured.

Former Liverpool Chief Executive Rick Parry announced on 5 October 2008 that although the stadium would still be built, work would be delayed until economic conditions improve.

=== Fenway Sports Group Era ===
By mid-2010 the club were in serious financial trouble with huge debts. This prompted the takeover of the club by a consortium led by John W Henry in October 2010. The group known as New England Sports Ventures (now Fenway Sports Group) announced that the club wanted to expand stadium capacity, and that they would reexamine all options, including redeveloping Anfield. FSG permanently ditched the more expensive HKS stadium designs in favour of a revised AFL design that would conform with the original planning permission.

In October 2012, BBC Sport reported that the owners of Liverpool FC had decided to redevelop their current home at Anfield stadium, rather than building a new stadium in Stanley Park. As part of the redevelopment the capacity of Anfield was to increase from 45,276 to approximately 60,000 and would cost in the region of £150m.

== Groundshare with Everton FC ==
It was reported that, should funding prove sufficiently difficult to acquire, there was a possibility that the stadium would be co-financed by Everton FC, who were also looking into the possibility of a new stadium in Kirkby, although this had been strenuously denied by Liverpool's former co-owner Tom Hicks. Due to the government's rejection of Everton FC's stadium project and financial problems at Everton FC, there had been speculation in the media as to a joint stadium project. Such a project received support from the leader of Liverpool city council and the chief of Liverpool's bid to host matches as part of the failed English 2018 World Cup bid. Despite media rumours, Liverpool FC always maintained that a ground sharing situation was never on the agenda. This idea was quashed once Liverpool F.C. completed their new Main Stand, removing the need for a potential new stadium.

== Access ==
=== Anfield Railway Station ===
In February 2008, it was revealed that Liverpool FC were looking to build a new rail station. Three locations have been looked at; Utting Avenue, Stanley Park Avenue and Pinehurst Avenue.
