= George Mahon (Everton F.C. chairman) =

- Born: 27 July 1853; Liverpool
- Died: 9 December 1908 (aged 55); Liverpool
- Occupation: Accountant
- Known for: Everton FC Chairman (1892–1895) (?–1908)

George Mahon (27 July 1853 – 9 December 1908) was a founding father and former chairman of Everton Football Club.

== Biography ==
George Mahon was born in Liverpool, Lancashire, England, on 27 July 1853. He was baptised at St. Anne Richmond Church of England Liverpool on 14 August 1853. His parents, Robert Mahon and Harriet Bates, were Irish. The Mahons came to Liverpool from Dublin, Ireland, where Robert and his father were shoemakers.

The family moved back to Dublin when George was about three years old and they lived in Ireland for nearly a decade. They lived in Wicklow Street then later in Pitt Street (now called Balfe Street). In 1858 Robert was elected to the Office of Beadle of St. Ann's Church, Dawson Street. His election was supported by his brother-in-law, Edward Bates, who was sexton of the church at the time. Robert's duties were to attend to the churchwardens, look after deserted children, provide coffins for the poor and other parochial business.

The Mahons returned to Liverpool in the mid 1860s and after initially working as a shoemaker, Robert got a job as a book keeper. His son George went into a similar profession and eventually became a senior partner in Roose, Mahon & Howorth, a leading accountancy firm. In 1875 George Mahon married Margaret Fyfe at St. Peter's Church, Sackville Street, Everton. The marriage record shows that at the time of his marriage George was working as a cashier and living at 108 Field Street in Everton.

Although the Mahon family had links to the established church, the family's burial practices and chapel attendance in Liverpool suggest that they were Nonconformists. By 1879 George Mahon was regularly attending the Great Homer Street Wesleyan Chapel in Everton where he provided musical accompaniment to the choir playing an American organ. Mahon delivered a lecture entitled "An Hour with Nature's Little Things" for the Anfield Wesleyan Literary Society in their chapel's lecture hall on 18 March 1887. The lecture was illustrated through the medium of a lantern microscope showing insects and pond life and was much appreciated by a large audience.

== Politics ==
In 1887 Mahon stood as a candidate in the St. Simon and St. Jude's Ward and was elected to the Walton Local Board. He was later elected chairman of the board. Mahon was a member of Walton Liberal Association and supported the Liberal Party's campaign to grant Home Rule for Ireland. He reorganized the district body after the defection of Liberal Unionists who were opposed to Gladstone's proposed solution to the Irish Question.

== Football ==
George Mahon was a key figure in the history of a football team formed at another Everton chapel. Reverend Ben Swift Chambers, minister of St. Domingo Methodist New Connexion Chapel, encouraged young members of his congregation to play cricket. Members later took up football to provide a team sport for them to play during winter. Initially formed in 1878 as St. Domingo FC, named after the location of the chapel on the corner of Breckfield Road North and St. Domingo Vale, the football team was renamed Everton in 1879 after the district of Everton. Mahon became involved with the team after watching them play Preston North End in May 1886.

Due to the rising rental costs of Everton's then home ground Anfield, Mahon was key to the decision to move to Mere Green, which later became known as Goodison Park. At a Special General Meeting convened in the college on Shaw Street on 25 January 1892, Mahon talked about the need for a new ground. A heckler shouted, "Yer can't find one!" and Mahon famously responded, "I've got one in my pocket." Mahon became the club's chairman in 1892 and was responsible for overseeing Everton's move from Anfield to Goodison Park and the creation of Everton Football Club Company Ltd. He remained a board member after resigning from the post of chairman in 1895 and returned as chairman before retiring from the position in May 1908.
