= Will Cuff =

English football chairman (1868–1949)

- Born: William Charles Cuff; 19 August 1868; Liverpool
- Died: 6 February 1949 (aged 80); Holywell Hotel, Parkgate, Wirral
- Other name: "Old Cuff" W C Cuff
- Occupation: Solicitor
- Known for: Everton FC Chairman (1921 – May 1938)

William Charles Cuff (19 August 1868 – 6 February 1949) was an English football manager and chairman. He was in charge of Everton F.C. from 1921 to 1938.

== Career ==
William Charles Cuff was born in Liverpool, Lancashire, England, on 19 August 1868. His father, Henry Albert Cuff, was from London. His mother, Mary Thomas, was Welsh. Cuff was in charge of Everton F.C. for over 500 games between 1901 and 1918. He was Chairman of Everton from 1921 to 1938. Cuff was an active freemason attending Cecil Lodge No. 3274. As a manager of Everton FC he won the FA Cup in the 1905–06 season and the First Division league title in the 1914–15 season.

== See also ==
- List of English football championship-winning managers
