= Stanley Park, Liverpool =

Park in Liverpool, England

Coordinates: 53.433981°N 2.959614°W

Stanley Park
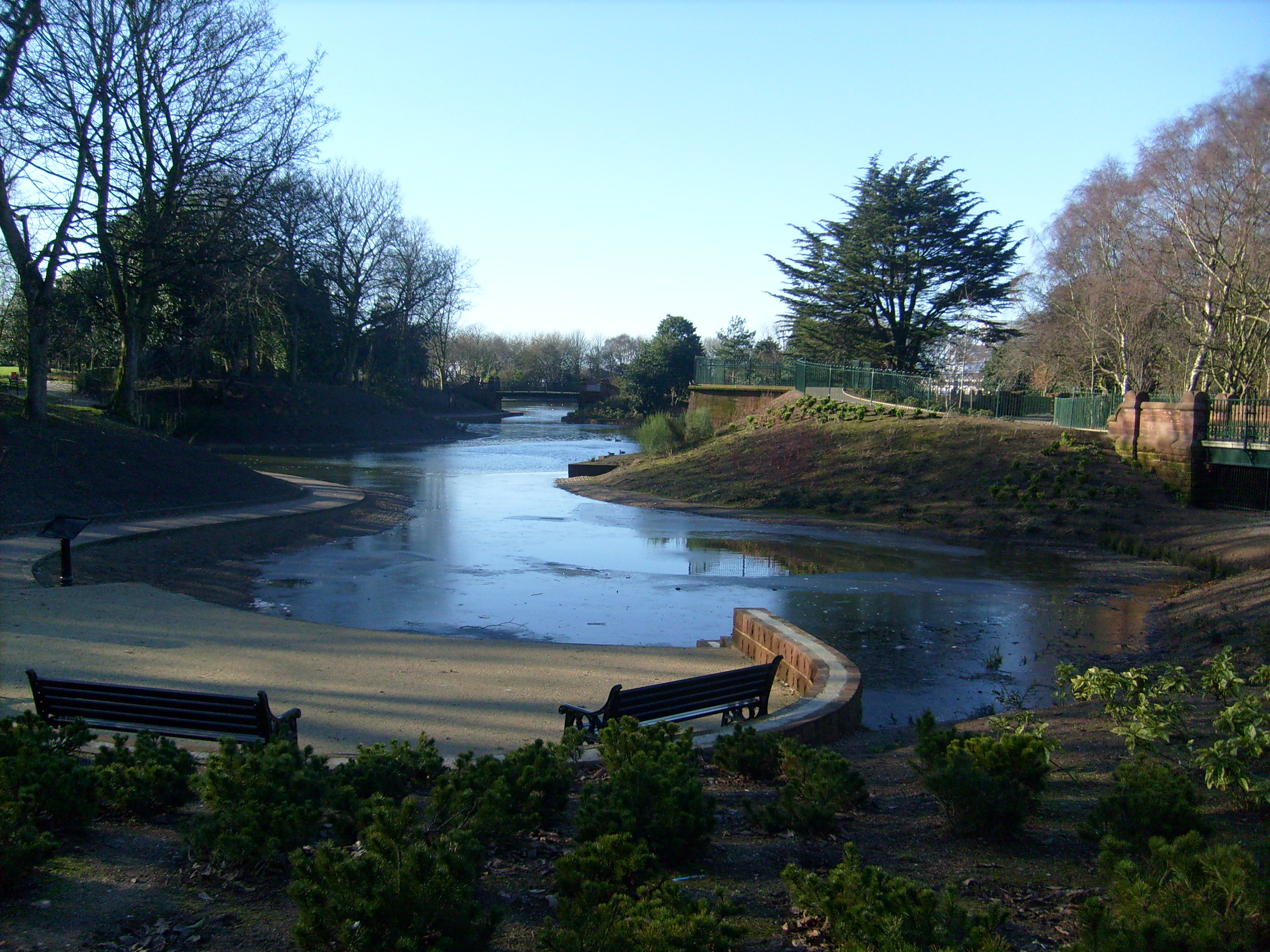
- Interactive map of Stanley Park
- Type: Municipal
- Location: Liverpool
- Area: 45 hectares (110 acres)
- Created: 14 May 1870
- Status: Open all year

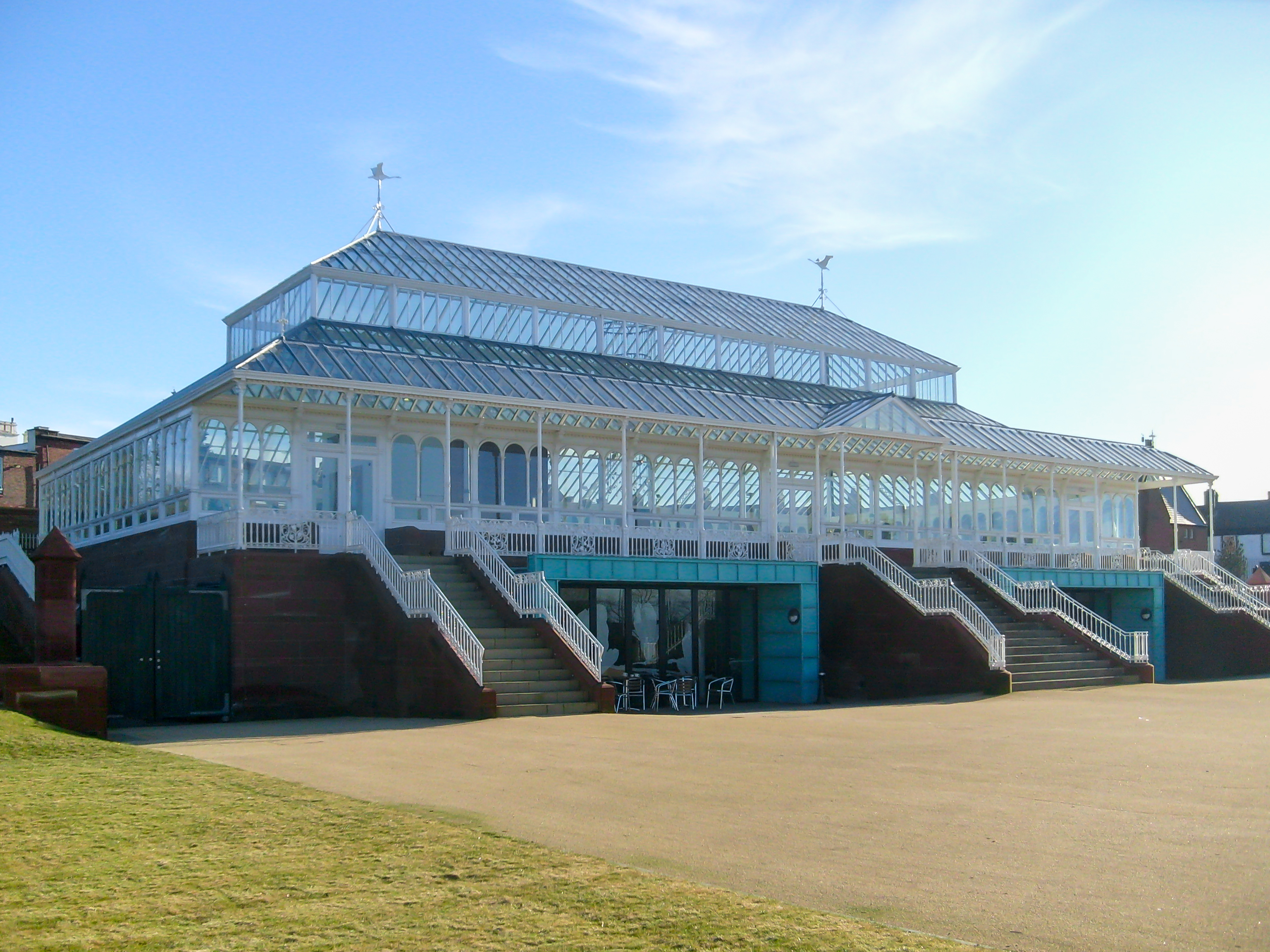
Isla Gladstone Conservatory

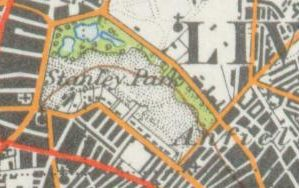
A map of Stanley Park from 1947

Stanley Park is a 110 acres (45 ha) park in Liverpool, England, designed by Edward Kemp, which was opened on 14 May 1870 by the Mayor of Liverpool, Joseph Hubback. It is significant among Liverpool's parks on account of its layout and architecture. It has a grand terrace with expansive bedding schemes that were once highlighted by fountains. It includes the 1899 Gladstone Conservatory (recently restored and renamed the Isla Gladstone Conservatory), a Grade II listed building built by Mackenzie & Moncur of Edinburgh. 50–60% of the land consisted of open turfed areas, suitable for sport, with most of the rest being laid out as formal gardens and lakes. Kemp designed a horse-riding track ('Rotten Row'), though it did not catch on and was restyled as a cycle track around 1907.

Stanley Park is known for dividing the home grounds of rival Merseyside football clubs Everton and Liverpool. However it was also the original home to a fledgling Everton Football Club in 1879 before the club moved to nearby Priory Road and then Anfield Road.

Part of Stanley Park was to have been incorporated into the area of Liverpool's proposed new stadium, plans for which were first announced in 2000, ironically the same location Everton F.C. played, but a change of ownership of the club during autumn 2010 resulted in the Stanley Park project being scrapped in October 2012, in favour of expanding Anfield.

The park has an Evangelical church located on the corner in between the two football teams. It is named "Stanley Park Church" and is over 100 years old.

The park is named after Lord Stanley of Preston.

== Stanley Park in literature and film ==
Stanley Park featured in Alexei Sayle's short story The Last Woman Killed in the War. As a film location it partly played a backdrop in Sayle's 1980s BBC documentary for the series Comic Roots. It featured in the 2003 film Dad's Dead.
