= 1894–95 Everton F.C. season =

English football club season

Everton
1894–95 season
- Manager: Dick Molyneux
- The Football League: Runners-up
- Top goalscorer: Jack Bell (15)
- Highest home attendance: 44,000 vs Liverpool (13 October 1894) record
- Lowest home attendance: 6,000 vs Stoke (7 January 1895), and Wolverhampton {8 April 1895}
- Average home league attendance: 17,860
Home colours

In the 1894–95 season, the English football team Everton F.C. finished second in the 1894–95 Football League. It was the team's best result since winning the League in 1891. Everton reached the quarterfinals of the F.A. Challenge Cup where they lost to Sheffield Wednesday F.C.

== Regular Football League First team ==
Note: Flags indicate national team as defined under FIFA eligibility rules; some limited exceptions apply. Players may hold more than one non-FIFA nationality.

Pos.	Nation	Player
	ENG	Richard Williams: 12 appearances in goal
	SCO	Bob Kelso: 19 appearances at right back and left half
	WAL	Charlie Parry: 27 appearances at left back
	SCO	Dickie Boyle: 30 appearances at right half and left half
	ENG	Johnny Holt: 27 appearances at left half
	SCO	Billy Stewart: 27 appearances at centre half
	SCO	Alex Latta: 20 appearances at outside right
	SCO	Tom McInnes: 23 appearances at inside right
	ENG	Jack Southworth: 9 appearances at centre forward
	ENG	Edgar Chadwick: 28 appearances at inside left
	SCO	Jack Bell: 29 appearances at outside left, inside right and centre forward

Number of games in which this eleven lined up = 0

== Other members of the first team squad ==
Note: Flags indicate national team as defined under FIFA eligibility rules; some limited exceptions apply. Players may hold more than one non-FIFA nationality.

Pos.	Nation	Player
	ENG	Tom Cain: 11 appearances in goal
	ENG	Jack Hillman: 6 appearances in goal
	GBR	William Sutton: 1 appearance in goal
	SCO	James Adams: 12 appearances at right back
	WAL	Smart Arridge: 3 appearances at left back
	SCO	David Storrier: 1 appearance at left half
	ENG	Jack Elliott 4 appearances at centre half and right half
	GBR	Bill Williams: 5 appearances at outside right
	SCO	Abe Hartley: 11 appearances at centre forward, inside right and inside left
	ENG	Fred Geary 8 appearances at centre forward and inside right
	SCO	James McMillan 1 appearance at inside left
	ENG	Alf Milward: 16 appearances at outside left, centre forward and outside right

Bob Howarth was the biggest name to leave Goodison Park during the summer as he returned to Preston North End. This gave Charlie Parry the chance to win back the left back shirt that he had lost when Howarth had arrived two years earlier. Reserve goalkeepers, John Whitehead and David Jardine both moved on, to Liverpool and Nelson respectively to seemingly cement Richard Williams' place between the posts. Two other fringe players, defender, Billy Lindsay and half back, Jack Walker left in search of regular first team football at Grimsby and Ardwick respectively. The only major inclusion to the first team squad was the signing of Tom McInnes from Scottish side Third Lanark. He instantly slotted into the inside right birth while Jack Bell moved out to outside left with Alf Milward making way.

Everton got off to a flying start when winning all their opening eight games and talk of the title coming to Goodison Park was high by the time of the ninth game at Blackburn. It was here that Jack Southworth suffered a leg injury that ended his career and without him Everton's air of invincibility slipped. Blackburn came from behind to beat the ten men and Everton then suffered a string of draws before returning to winning ways. Fred Geary took over at centre forward but yet again found himself losing the berth as Abe Hartley proved more potent in front of goal. Despite having seen off two rivals, Richard Williams' place in goal remained one that the selectors aimed to rectify. Reserves William Sutton and Tom Cain each got their chance but both were considered unworthy, which saw the board spend £150 to bring 'Happy' Jack Hillman from Burnley with Williams leaving to join Luton. Hillman was established as the regular keeper by the end of the season.

Despite the loss of Southworth, Everton maintained a strong title challenge and topped the table throughout the remainder of 1894 before dropping to third after a defeat by Wednesday on New Year's Day 1895. Everton never regained top spot and their failure to win the title was put down to their failing to win any of their final three games when victories would have seen them crowned champions. The first of the trio of games was a shock 2–3 reverse against Derby when a draw would have been enough to take them top. It was the penultimate game that proved crucial however.

The destiny of the title was still in Everton's hands going into the final two games but their opponents in the first of those two games were title rivals Sunderland at Newcastle Road in what was effectively a title decider. This was Sunderland's final game and they needed only to draw to clinch the title for themselves. Twenty thousand people saw Sunderland win the match and the championship with a 2–1 scoreline and rendered Everton's final game meaningless. As it was, Everton could only draw that game at Aston Villa 2–2, a result which would have taken the title to Sunderland regardless.

Everton's best season since being crowned champions in 1891 was viewed on Merseyside as a huge disappointment as everyone connected with the club felt that the title had been theirs to win and instead had been gift wrapped for a Sunderland side who, while deserving champions, seemed flattered by their five-point margin of victory. In addition Sunderland had taken three of the four points on offer from their encounters with Everton that season, making claims by Evertonians that the better side had finished second ring a little hollow.

== The Football League ==
Date	Opponents	Home/ Away	Result F – A	Scorers	Attendance
1 September 1894	Sheffield Wednesday	H	3–1	Tom McInnes, Edgar Chadwick, Jack Bell	19,000
3 September 1894	Small Heath	H	5–0	Jack Bell {2}, Jack Southworth (3)	8,000
8 September 1894	Stoke	A	3–1	Alex Latta, Tom McInnes, Edgar Chadwick	5,000
15 September 1894	Nottingham Forest	H	6–1	Alex Latta, Tom McInnes, Jack Southworth (3), Jack Bell	15,000
22 September 1894	Nottingham Forest	A	3–2	Edgar Chadwick, Jack Southworth, Jack Bell	7,000
29 September 1894	West Bromwich Albion	H	4–1	Edgar Chadwick, Jack Southworth, Jack Bell, Tom McInnes	19,900
6 October 1894	Bolton Wanderers	A	3–1	Edgar Chadwick, Tom McInnes, Alex Latta	14,000
13 October 1894	Liverpool	H	3–0	Alex Latta, Tom McInnes, Jack Bell	44,000
20 October 1894	Blackburn Rovers	A	3–4	Abe Hartley, Jack Southworth, Edgar Chadwick	15,000
27 October 1894	Sunderland	H	2–2	Dickie Boyle, Tom McInnes	15,000
3 November 1894	Small Heath	A	4–4	Alex Latta (3), Jack Bell	10,000
17 November 1894	Liverpool	A	2–2	Alex Latta, Bob Kelso {penalty}	30,000
24 November 1894	Blackburn	H	2–1	Alf Milward, Jack Bell	18,000
1 December 1894	West Bromwich Albion	A	4–1	Alf Milward, Alex Latta, Edgar Chadwick, Billy Stewart	18,000
8 December 1894	Bolton Wanderers	H	3–1	Alex Latta, Edgar Chadwick, Tom McInnes	12,000
15 December 1894	Preston North End	A	2–1	Abe Hartley, Alf Milward	10,000
1 January 1895	The Wednesday	A	0–3		20,000
5 January 1895	Wolves	A	0–1		6,000
7 January 1895	Stoke	H	3–0	Bill Williams, Fred Geary, Edgar Chadwick	6,000
12 January 1895	Derby County	A	2–2	Fred Geary, Charlie Parry	1,500
17 January 1895	Aston Villa	H	4–2	Fred Geary, Alf Milward (2), Jack Bell	15,000
26 January 1895	Sheffield United	H	1–1	Tom McInnes	15,000
23 February 1895	Preston North End	H	4–2	Alf Milward, Abe Hartley, Edgar Chadwick, Jack Bell	20,000
26 February 1895	Sheffield United	A	2–4	Abe Hartley, Tom McInnes	12,000
16 March 1895	Burnley	A	4–2	Billy Stewart, Jack Bell, Edgar Chadwick, Alf Milward	8,000
21 March 1895	Burnley	H	3–2	Jack Bell, Alf Milward, Alex Latta	8,000
8 April 1895	Wolves	H	2–1	Jack Bell, Alf Milward	6,000
13 April 1895	Derby County	H	2–3	Alf Milward, Fred Geary	10,000
20 April 1895	Sunderland	A	1–2	Edgar Chadwick	20,000
24 April 1895	Aston Villa	A	2–2	Dickie Boyle, Abe Hartley	5,000

== First Division final table ==
		P	W	D	L	F	A	GA	Pts
1	Sunderland	30	21	5	4	80	37	2.162	47
2	Everton	30	18	6	6	82	50	1.640	42
3	Aston Villa	30	17	5	8	82	43	1.907	39
4	Preston North End	30	15	5	10	62	46	1.348	35
5	Blackburn Rovers	30	11	10	9	59	49	1.204	32
6	Sheffield United	30	14	4	12	57	55	1.036	32
7	Nottingham Forest	30	13	5	12	50	56	0.893	31
8	The Wednesday	30	12	4	14	50	55	0.909	28
9	Burnley	30	11	4	15	44	56	0.786	26
10	Bolton Wanderers	30	9	7	14	61	62	0.984	25
11	Wolverhampton Wanderers	30	9	7	14	43	63	0.683	25
12	Small Heath	30	9	7	14	50	74	0.676	25
13	West Bromwich Albion	30	10	4	16	51	66	0.773	24
14	Stoke	30	9	6	15	50	67	0.746	24
15	Derby County	30	7	9	14	45	68	0.662	23
16	Liverpool	30	7	8	15	51	70	0.729	22

== Football Association Challenge Cup ==
Date	Round	Opponents	Home/ Away	Result F – A	Scorers	Attendance
2 February 1895	First	Southport	A	3–0	Jack Bell (3)	7,000
16 February 1895	Second	Blackburn	H	1–1	Edgar Chadwick	20,000
20 February 1895	replay	Blackburn	A	3–2	Edgar Chadwick (2), Abe Hartley	20,000
2 March 1895	Quarter final	The Wednesday	A	0–2		9,000

== Club League records set this season ==
- Most points in a season {42}
- Most home points in a season {26}
- Most away points in a season {16}
- Most victories in a season {18}
- Most victories at home in a season {12}
- Most drawn games in a season {6}
- Most games drawn away from home in a season {4}
- Equalled fewest home defeats in a season {1}
- Most goal scored away from home in a season {35}
- Alex Latta scored a club record sixth league hat-trick this season
- Equalled longest winning sequence in a season {8}
- Longest home winning sequence in a season {7}
- Equalled longest unbeaten sequence in a season {8}
- Longest unbeaten home sequence in a season {14}
- Longest sequence of drawn games in a season {3}
- Longest sequence of away drawn games {2}

=== Negative club records ===
- Equalled longest away sequence without a win {4}
