= 1896–97 Everton F.C. season =

English football club season

Everton
1896–97 season
- Manager: Dick Molyneux
- The Football League: 7th
- Top goalscorer: Jack Bell (15)
- Highest home attendance: 45,000 vs Liverpool 21 November 1896
- Lowest home attendance: 6,000 vs Wolves 31 October 1896, vs Burnley 28 November 1896 and vs Bury 24 April 1897
- Average home league attendance: 15,913
Home colours

The 1896-97 Football League season was the ninth in Football League history with Everton having been an ever present in the top division. The club played thirty-five games in England's two major competitions, winning eighteen, drawing three and losing fourteen. The club finished the season in seventh place, eight points clear of the test match relegation place, and reached their second FA Cup final but again lost, this time 2–3 against Aston Villa.

== Season review ==
In each of the previous two seasons Everton had started the calendar year on top of the League, only to falter in the second half of the season. In their bid to strengthen the forward line they brought in Jack Taylor from his hometown club St Mirren, slotting into the role vacated by Tom McInnes who had departed during the summer for Luton Town to join the forward line of Bell, Chadwick, Milward and Hartley.

Elsewhere, the established half-back line of Boyle, Holt & Stewart continued to play ahead of full-back Smart Arridge, who was partnered in defense by David Storrier following James Adams' return to his former club, Hearts.

On paper this side looked as good as any in the First Division but there was uncertainty over the ability of the inexperienced goalkeeper, Harry Briggs, who had stepped in to make just one appearance the previous season after the departure of Jack Hillman.

With the exception of the inclusion of John Cameron in place of Hartley, this was the team that won their opening game against The Wednesday, while Barker made his debut at the back, in place of Arridge in their second game, another victory over Wolves that took the Toffeemen joint top of the table with Bolton, albeit already having a game in hand on the Trotters. The Merseysiders went on to win four of their opening five games before embarking on a dreadful slump that provided just a solitary victory in their next nine games.

The change initially looked to have been a wise one as, shortly after Menham's arrival, Everton embarked on a run of seven consecutive League and Cup victories to put themselves right back into the title race, four points behind leaders, Aston Villa with ten games remaining.

The last of those victories was Everton's first round cup tie with Burton Wanderers and it seemed that the cup run once again affected their League form as they now went on a run of six consecutive League defeats which killed any lingering title ambitions.

== First team squad and appearances ==
Pos.	Name	League		FA Cup		Total	
Pos.	Name	Apps	Goals	Apps	Goals	Apps	Goals
GK	(England) Harry Briggs	10	0	0	0	10	0
GK	(England) Bob Menham	18	0	5	0	23	0
GK	(Scotland) John Patrick	1	0	0	0	1	0
GK	(England) John Palmer	1	0	0	0	1	0
FB	(Scotland) David Storrier	25	0	3	0	28	0
FB	(Wales) Smart Arridge	23	0	3	0	26	0
FB	(England) George Barker	4	0	0	0	4	0
FB	(England) George Molyneux	1	0	0	0	1	0
FB	(Scotland) Peter Meechan	7	0	4	0	11	0
HB	(Scotland) Dickie Boyle	29	0	5	1	34	1
HB	(England) Johnny Holt	25	1	5	1	30	2
HB	(Scotland) Billy Stewart {Capt}	29	3	4	0	33	3
HB	(Scotland) Hugh Goldie	3	0	0	0	3	0
HB	(Scotland) John Robertson	3	0	1	0	4	0
HB	(Scotland) George Meiklejohn	1	0	0	0	1	0
FW	(Scotland) Jack Bell	27	15	5	2	32	17
FW	(Scotland) Jack Taylor	30	13	5	2	35	15
FW	(Scotland) John Cameron	15	5	0	0	15	5
FW	(England) Edgar Chadwick	28	7	5	2	33	9
FW	(England) Alf Milward	27	9	5	3	32	12
FW	(Scotland) Abe Hartley	14	6	5	3	19	9
FW	(England) William Campbell	3	1	0	0	3	1
FW	(England) Alf Schofield	1	0	0	0	1	0
FW	(Scotland) William Maley	2	0	0	0	2	0
FW	(England) William Williams	1	0	0	0	1	0
FW	(England) Bert Banks	2	0	0	0	2	0
–	Own goals	–	1	–	1	–	2

== Final league table ==
Pos	Club	P	W	D	L	F	A	GA	Pts
1	Aston Villa	30	21	5	4	73	38	1.921	47
2	Sheffield United	30	13	10	7	42	29	1.448	36
3	Derby County	30	16	4	10	70	50	1.400	36
4	Preston North End	30	11	12	7	55	40	1.375	34
5	Liverpool	30	12	9	9	46	38	1.211	33
6	The Wednesday	30	10	11	9	42	37	1.135	31
7	Everton	30	14	3	13	62	57	1.088	31
8	Bolton Wanderers	30	12	6	12	40	43	0.930	30
9	Bury	30	10	10	10	39	44	0.886	30
10	Wolverhampton Wanderers	30	11	6	13	45	41	1.098	28
11	Nottingham Forest	30	9	8	13	44	49	0.898	26
12	West Bromwich Albion	30	10	6	14	33	56	0.589	26
13	Stoke	30	11	3	16	48	59	0.814	25
14	Blackburn Rovers	30	11	3	16	35	62	0.565	25
15	Sunderland	30	7	9	14	34	47	0.723	23
16	Burnley	30	6	7	17	43	61	0.705	19

Key: P = Matches played; W = Matches won; D = Matches drawn; L = Matches lost; F = Goals for; A = Goals against; GA = Goal average; Pts = Points

== The Football League ==
Everton home games were played at Goodison Park while away games were played at the venues stated

Date	Opponents	Venue	Result F – A	Scorers	Attendance
5 September 1896	Sheffield Wednesday	Goodison Park	2–1	John Cameron, Jack Taylor	15,000
12 September 1896	Nottingham Forest	Molineux	1–0	Tommy Dunn (own goal)	5,500
19 September 1896	Aston Villa	Goodison Park	2–3	Jack Taylor, Alf Milward	20,000
26 September 1896	Aston Villa	Wellington Road	2–1	James Welford (own goal), Edgar Chadwick	20,000
3 October 1896	Liverpool	Goodison Park	2–1	Alf Milward, Abe Hartley	45,000
10 October 1896	Burnley	Turf Moor	1–2	Billy Stewart	9,000
17 October 1896	Sheffield United	Goodison Park	1–2	William Foulke (own goal)	15,000
24 October 1896	Sheffield Wednesday	Olive Grove	1–4	Alf Milward	6,000
31 October 1896	Wolverhampton Wanderers	Goodison Park	0–0		10,000
14 November 1896	Bolton Wanderers	Goodison Park	2–3	Alf Milward, Edgar Chadwick	12,000
21 November 1896	Liverpool	Anfield	0–0		30,000
28 November 1896	Burnley	Goodison Park	6–0	John Cameron (3), Edgar Chadwick, Alf Milward, Jack Bell	10,000
7 December 1896	Bolton Wanderers	Burnden Park	0–2		7,000
12 December 1896	Sunderland	Newcastle Road	1–1	Johnny Holt	4,000
19 December 1896	Stoke City	Goodison Park	4–2	John Cameron, Jack Bell (2), Jack Taylor	10,000
26 December 1896	Sunderland	Goodison Park	5–2	Edgar Chadwick, Jack Bell (2), Alf Milward (pen), Abe Hartley	35,000
1 January 1897	Sheffield United	Goodison Park	2–1	Jack Taylor (2)	10,000
2 January 1897	Stoke City	Victoria Ground	3–2	Abe Hartley, Jack Taylor, Jack Bell	8,000
9 January 1897	Nottingham Forest	Goodison Park	3–1	Jack Taylor, Jack Bell (2)	7,000
16 January 1897	West Bromwich Albion	Stoney Lane	4–1	Jack Taylor (3), Jack Bell	3,950
6 February 1897	Preston North End	Stoney Lane	3–4	Jack Taylor, Abe Hartley, Edgar Chadwick	25,000
2 March 1897	Bury	Gigg Lane	1–3	Alf Milward	7,000
6 March 1897	Blackburn Rovers	Ewood Park	2–4	Jack Bell, Jack Taylor	6,000
10 March 1897	Nottingham Forest	Gregory Ground	0–3		2,000
13 March 1897	Blackburn Rovers	Goodison Park	0–3		10,000
3 April 1897	Preston North End	Deepdale	1–4	William Campbell	2,000
16 April 1897	Derby County	Goodison Park	5–2	Alf Milward, Edgar Chadwick (2), Abe Hartley, Jack Bell	25,000
17 April 1897	West Bromwich Albion	Goodison Park	6–3	Jack Bell (3), Jack Taylor, Alf Milward, Edgar Chadwick	9,700
20 April 1897	Derby County	Baseball Ground	1–0	Billy Stewart	14,000
24 April 1897	Bury	Goodison Park	1–2	Jack Bell	10,000
