= 1895–96 Everton F.C. season =

English football club season

Everton
1895–96 season
- Manager: Dick Molyneux
- The Football League: 3rd
- Top goalscorer: Alf Milward (19)
- Highest home attendance: 30,000 vs Aston Villa 21 December 1895
- Lowest home attendance: 7,000 vs Wolves 2 November 1895
- Average home league attendance: 15,242
Home colours

The 1895-96 Football League season was the eighth in Football League history with Everton having been an ever present in the top division. The club played thirty-three games in England's two major competitions, winning eighteen, drawing seven and losing eight. The club finished the season in third place, six points adrift of Champions Aston Villa, and were defeated in the quarter final of the F A Cup by eventual winners The Wednesday. Their Goodison Park home hosted the drawn semi final between Wednesday and Bolton Wanderers.

== Season review ==
The Everton board kept faith in the squad that had finished runners up the previous season with no major signings or departures during the summer. This meant that Jack Hillman was the undisputed first choice goalkeeper for the season and would go on to play all bar the final game in which Harry Briggs made his club debut in a 2–1 victory at Stoke. Bob Kelso, Charlie Parry and James Adams resumed their battle for the two full back positions from the previous season. Adams missed the first game of the season but returned to miss just one other game as he established himself as the first choice full back but Both Kelso and Parry fell out of favour as reserve, Smart Arridge emerged as a solid full back partner to Adams. Kelso, who played the first five games of the season, made just one further appearance for the club in the half back line before leaving to join Dundee in February. Parry's long love, hate relationship with the Goodison Park club finally came to an end after his second appearance of the season when he gave away a penalty, which was missed, in a 3–4 defeat at Aston Villa in September. Before the year was out the Welsh International defender had moved on to Ardwick.

The solid half back line of Dickie Boyle, Johnny Holt and Billy Stewart, considered so instrumental in the club's title push last year was unsurprisingly unaltered and the trio continued in the same vein as they had done the previous year. Hugh Goldie, a summer signing from St Mirren proved a successful reserve when required and regularly filled in for the regular trio when required.

Everton were strongest in the forward line where Jack Bell, Tom McInnes, Edgar Chadwick and Alf Milward remained regulars but the club's record hat-trick scorer, Alex Latta began to find opportunities limited as he slipped down the pecking order behind Abe Hartley. The arrival of John Cameron, yet another Scot, from Queens Park, in September further reduced Latta's opportunities and he left before the end of the season for local rivals Liverpool.

While the club seemed prepared to mount a fresh title challenge on the field, they were anything but prepared off it as chairman, George Mahon announced a healthy £6,000 profit at the club agm before promptly resigning, along with four other directors over 'acute administrative difficulties'. Six new directors were elected along with a new Chairman, Dr Baxter who pushed through the building of a new stand on the Bullens Road end of the ground and put a roof on the Goodison Road Stand.

The club made an indifferent start to the League campaign, winning four, drawing three and losing four of their first eleven games before embarking on a run of nine consecutive victories from November to January that took them top of the table and marked them as favourites to win their second League Title.

The Toffeemen were knocked off the top of the table on 4 January when Derby County won a game in hand to go a point clear. The Merseysiders' title challenge stuttered in the first three months of the year, winning just two of their next six games and leaving the club six points adrift of Aston Villa but with four games and eight points to play for against Villa's two remaining games. On 3 April Everton embarked on a hectic schedule of four games in eight days to win the title but their hopes were dashed at the first hurdle when a 2–2 draw at home to Derby County was coupled with victory for Villa at Nottingham Forest to leave Everton seven points adrift with just three games to play.

The Toffeemen finished the season in third position, six points behind champions, Villa, one place and three points worse off than when finishing Runners Up the previous season.

In the F.A. Cup Everton came through their first two ties comfortably defeating top flight opponents Nottingham Forest in Nottingham and Sheffield United at Goodison Park to an aggregate of 5–0. However confidence was low when the side traveled to Sheffield Wednesday on quarter final day, just nine days after the side had lost a League game at the same venue 1–3. They fared even worse in the cup tie, losing 0–4 to the eventual cup winners.

== Final league table ==
Pos	Club	P	W	D	L	F	A	GA	Pts
1	Aston Villa	30	20	5	5	78	45	1.733	45
2	Derby County	30	17	7	6	68	35	1.943	41
3	Everton	30	16	7	7	66	43	1.535	39
4	Bolton Wanderers	30	16	5	9	49	37	1.324	37
5	Sunderland	30	15	7	8	52	41	1.268	37
6	Stoke	30	15	0	15	56	47	1.191	30
7	The Wednesday	30	12	5	13	44	53	0.830	29
8	Blackburn Rovers	30	12	5	13	40	50	0.800	29
9	Preston North End	30	11	6	13	44	48	0.917	28
10	Burnley	30	10	7	13	48	44	1.091	27
11	Bury	30	12	3	15	50	54	0.926	27
12	Sheffield United	30	10	6	14	40	50	0.800	26
13	Nottingham Forest	30	11	3	16	42	57	0.737	25
14	Wolverhampton Wanderers	30	10	1	19	61	65	0.938	21
15	Small Heath	30	8	4	18	39	79	0.494	20
16	West Bromwich Albion	30	6	7	17	30	59	0.508	19

Key: P = Matches played; W = Matches won; D = Matches drawn; L = Matches lost; F = Goals for; A = Goals against; GA = Goal average; Pts = Points

== The Football League ==
Everton home games were played at Goodison Park while away games were played at the venues stated

Date	Opponents	venue	Result F – A	Scorers	Attendance
2 September 1895	Sheffield Wednesday	Goodison Park	2–2	Dickie Boyle, Alf Milward	15,000
7 September 1895	Nottingham Forest	Goodison Park	6–2	Edgar Chadwick {2}, Alf Milward {2} Jack Bell, Albert Flewitt	16,000
9 September 1895	Bury	Goodison Park	3–2	Jack Bell, Alf Milward, Edgar Chadwick	8,000
14 September 1895	Bolton Wanderers	Burnden Park	1–3	Tom McInnes	14,000
21 September 1895	Blackburn Rovers	Goodison Park	0–2		20,000
28 September 1895	Wolverhampton Wanderers	Molineux Stadium	3–2	Tom McInnes {2}, Alf Milward	6,000
30 September 1895	Aston Villa	Wellington Road	3–4	Jack Bell {3}	15,000
5 October 1895	Sheffield United	Goodison Park	5–0	Alex Latta, Edgar Chadwick {3}, Alf Milward	10,000
12 October 1895	Nottingham Forest	Town Ground	1–2	Edgar Chadwick	8,000
19 October 1895	West Bromwich Albion	Goodison Park	1–1	Alf Milward	18,900
26 October 1895	Burnley	Turf Moor	1–1	Abe Hartley	8,000
2 November 1895	Wolverhampton Wanderers	Goodison Park	2–0	Edgar Chadwick, Alf Milward	7,000
9 November 1895	Sheffield United	Bramall Lane	2–1	Alf Milward, Abe Hartley	4,000
16 November 1895	Sunderland	Goodison Park	1–0	Alf Milward	15,000
23 November 1895	West Bromwich Albion	Stoney Lane	3–0	Tom McInnes, Abe Hartley, Alf Milward	3,950
30 November 1895	Burnley	Goodison Park	2–1	James Adams, Dickie Boyle	14,000
7 December 1895	Small Heath	Muntz Street	3–0	Alf Milward {3}	3,000
14 December 1895	Stoke	Goodison Park	7–2	Tom McInnes {3}, Jack Bell {2}, John Cameron, Alf Milward	10,000
21 December 1895	Aston Villa	Goodison Park	2–0	Jack Bell, Tom Mcinnes	30,000
1 January 1896	Blackburn Rovers	Ewood Park	3–2	Jack Bell, Edgar Chadwick, Murray (own goal)	20,000
11 January 1896	Bury	Gigg Lane	1–1	Alf Milward	9,000
25 January 1896	Preston North End	Goodison Park	1–1	Edgar Chadwick	10,000
3 February 1896	Small Heath	Goodison Park	3–0	Abe Hartley {2}, Hugh Goldie	8,000
18 February 1896	Wednesday	Olive Grove	1–3	John Cameron	8,000
22 February 1896	Sunderland	Newcastle Road	0–3		7,000
7 March 1896	Preston North End	Goodison Park	3–2	Alf Milward, Dickie Boyle, Abe Hartley	12,000
3 April 1896	Derby County	Goodison Park	2–2	John Cameron (2)	25,000
6 April 1896	Bolton Wanderers	Goodison Park	1–1	Edgar Chadwick	15,000
7 April 1896	Derby County	Baseball Ground	1–2	William Williams	7,000
11 April 1896	Stoke	Victoria Ground	2–1	Abe Hartley, Alf Schofield	3,000

== Football Association Challenge Cup ==
Date	Round	Opponents	Venue	Result F – A	Scorers	Attendance
1 February 1896	First	Nottingham Forest	Town Ground	2–0	Edgard Chadwick, Alf Milward	15,000
15 February 1896	Second	Sheffield United	Goodison Park	3–0	Jack Bell, John Cameron, Alf Milward {penalty}	20,000
29 February 1896	Quarter Final	Wednesday	Olive Grove	0–4		12,000

- Source: Everton Stats.

== First Team Squad and Appearances ==
Pos.	Name	League		FA Cup		Total	
Pos.	Name	Apps	Goals	Apps	Goals	Apps	Goals
GK	(England) Jack Hillman	29	0	3	0	32	0
GK	(England) Harry Briggs	1	0	0	0	1	0
FB	(Scotland) James Adams	28	1	3	0	31	1
FB	(Wales) Smart Arridge	23	0	2	0	25	0
FB	(Wales) Charlie Parry	2	0	0	0	2	0
FB/HB	(Scotland) Bob Kelso	6	0	1	0	7	0
FB|HB	(Scotland) David Storrier	3	0	1	0	4	0
HB	(Scotland) Dickie Boyle	30	3	3	0	33	1
HB	(Scotland) William Stewart	28	0	3	0	31	0
HB	(England) Johnny Holt	14	0	2	0	16	0
HB	(Scotland) John Robertson	1	0	0	0	1	0
HB	(England) Jack Elliott	1	0	0	0	1	0
HB|FW	(Scotland) Hugh Goldie	15	1	1	0	16	1
FW	(England) Alf Milward	30	17	2	2	32	19
FW	(England) Edgar Chadwick	28	11	3	1	31	12
FW	(Scotland) Jack Bell	27	9	3	1	30	10
FW	(Scotland) Tom McInnes	19	8	1	0	20	8
FW	(Scotland) Abe Hartley	15	7	1	7	16	7
FW	(Scotland) John Cameron	13	4	3	1	16	5
FW	(England) William Williams	8	1	0	0	8	1
FW	(Scotland) Alex Latta	5	1	0	0	5	1
FW	(England) Albert Flewitt	3	1	0	0	3	1
FW	(England) Alf Schofield	1	1	1	0	2	1
–	Own goals	–	1	–	0	–	1
