= 1893–94 Everton F.C. season =

English football club season

Everton
1893–94 season
- Manager: Dick Molyneux
- The Football League: 6th
- Top goalscorer: Jack Southworth (27)
- Highest home attendance: 30,000 vs Sunderland (30 September 1893) record
- Lowest home attendance: 4,000 vs Bolton Wanderers (26 March 1894)
- Average home league attendance: 12,866
Home colours

The 1893–94 Everton F.C. season lists the results of the British association football team Everton F.C. in the 1893–94 season.

== Regular Football League First team ==
Note: Flags indicate national team as defined under FIFA eligibility rules; some limited exceptions apply. Players may hold more than one non-FIFA nationality.

Pos.	Nation	Player
	ENG	Richard Williams: 26 appearances in goal
	SCO	Bob Kelso: 26 appearances at right back, left back, right half and centre half
	ENG	Bob Howarth: 22 appearances at right & left back
	SCO	Dickie Boyle: 21 appearances at right and left half
	ENG	Johnny Holt: 26 appearances at left half
	SCO	Billy Stewart: 29 appearances at centre half
	SCO	Alex Latta: 29 appearances at outside and inside right
	SCO	Jack Bell: 24 appearances at inside right, centre forward and outside left
	ENG	Jack Southworth: 22 appearances at centre forward
	ENG	Edgar Chadwick: 24 appearances at inside left
	ENG	Alf Milward: 24 appearances at outside left, inside right and centre forward

Number of League games in which this eleven was fielded = 5

- 9 September, 3–7 defeat by Derby
- 30 September, 7–1 victory over Sunderland
- 7 October, 1–2 defeat by Burnley
- 14 October 2–2 draw with Blackburn(third consecutive game)
- 11 November 1–2 defeat by Derby

== Other members of the first team squad ==
Note: Flags indicate national team as defined under FIFA eligibility rules; some limited exceptions apply. Players may hold more than one non-FIFA nationality.

Pos.	Nation	Player
	ENG	John Whitehead: 2 appearances in goal
	SCO	David Jardine 2 appearances in goal
	WAL	Charlie Parry 11 appearances at right and left back
	ENG	Billy Lindsay 9 appearances at right and left back
	WAL	Smart Arridge 2 appearances at left back
	EGY	Jack Walker 3 appearances at right and left half
	SCO	David Storrier 1 appearance at left half
	ENG	Fred Geary 9 appearances across the forward line
	ENG	Harry Reay 1 appearance at outside right
	SCO	Alan Maxwell 4 appearances at inside right and centre forward
	SCO	Abe Hartley 6 appearances at inside right and centre forward
	SCO	James McMillan 4 appearances at inside left
	ENG	Jack Elliott 4 appearances at centre half and outside left

The departure of Alec Stewart to newly promoted Darwen and injury to Fred Geary left Everton needing a new left half and centre forward during the summer of 1893. The two men signed were of the highest calibre in the shape of Billy Stewart who had thrice been a league runner-up with Preston and record £400 signing of Jack Southworth from cash strapped Blackburn. Despite two such high-profile signings Everton's start to the season proved very inconsistent and was a bench mark for the rest of the season in which they would finish only sixth. The full back partnership of Kelso and Howarth was broken up after the first ten games and played together just three more times as six different combinations including Parry, Lindsay and Arridge were tried in a bid to bring stability in front of Richard William's goal. The half back line of Boyle, Holt and Stewart lasted just three games before John Walker was tried in place of Holt after the 3–7 defeat by Derby. Holt was quickly recalled while Kelso, having been moved out of the back line was tried regularly in place of Dickie Boyle at right half in the second half of the season. The expensive signing of Southworth came too late for the first two games of the season in which the forward line, still robbed of Geary started as Latta, Bell, Maxwell, Chadwick and Milward. Alan Maxwell was replaced at centre forward by Alf Milward for the second game with James McMillan coming into the reshuffled front rank before Southworth made the slot his own in the third game with John Bell deputising for three games and Fred Geary, now back from injury stepping in for three. Geary was restricted to just nine appearances all season in every position of the front rank while Maxwell was also unable to get into the side, moving to newly promoted Darwen where his goals were unable to stave off relegation.

== The Football League ==
Date	Opponents	Home/ Away	Result F – A	Scorers	Attendance
2 September 1893	Sheffield United	H	2–3	Alf Milward, Alex Latta	14,000
4 September 1893	Nottingham Forest	H	4–0	Dickie Boyle, Alf Milward, James McMillan (2)	12,000
9 September 1893	Derby County	A	3–7	Jack Southworth, Edgar Chadwick, Alf Milward	8,000
16 September 1893	Aston Villa	H	4–2	Bob Kelso, John Walker, Jack Bell, James McMillan	15,000
23 September 1893	Aston Villa	A	1–3	Jack Southworth	7,000
30 September 1893	Sunderland	H	7–1	Edgar Chadwick (3), Alex Latta (2), Jack Southworth, Alf Milward	30,000
7 October 1893	Burnley	A	1–2	William Stewart	10,000
14 October 1893	Blackburn Rovers	H	2–2	Jack Southworth, Alf Milward	15,000
21 October 1893	Darwen	H	8–1	Ales Latta (2), Alan Maxwell (2), Jack Southworth (2, 1-pen), Edgar Chadwick, Jack Bell	9,000
28 October 1893	Preston North End	H	2–3	Jack Southworth	16,000
4 November 1893	Sheffield Wednesday	A	1–1	Alf Milward	7,000
11 November 1893	Derby County	H	1–2	Alex Latta	15,000
25 November 1893	Burnley	H	4–3	Edgar Chadwick, Jack Bell, Fred Geary	10,000
2 December 1893	Newtown Heath	A	3–0	Fred Geary (2, 1-pen), Edgar Chadwick	6,000
4 December 1893	Wolverhampton Wanderers	A	0–2		4,000
9 December 1893	Sheffield United	A	3–0	Jack Southworth (2), Alf Milward	10,000
16 December 1893	Blackburn Rovers	A	3–4	Jack Bell, Jack Southworth, Edgar Chadwick	10,000
23 December 1893	Wednesday	H	8–1	Alex Latta, Jack Southworth (4), Jack Bell (2), Edgar Chadwick	9,000
30 December 1893	West Bromwich Albion	H	7–1	Jack Southworth (6), John Bell	14,000
1 January 1894	Darwen	A	3–3	Jack Southworth, Edgar Chadwick, John Leach (own goal)	10,000
6 January 1894	Newtown Heath	H	2–0	Jack Southworth, Edgar Chadwick	8,000
13 January 1894	Preston North End	A	4–2	Jack Southworth, Edgar Chadwick, Alf Milward, Moses Saunders (own goal)	10,000
18 January 1894	Nottingham Forest	A	2–3	Fred Geary, Alec Stewart (own goal)	4,000
3 February 1894	West Bromwich Albion	A	1–3	Jack Bell	3,000
6 February 1894	Sunderland	A	0–1		10,000
3 March 1894	Stoke	A	1–3	Jack Southworth	7,000
24 March 1894	Wolves	A	3–0	Fred Geary (2), Jack Southworth	5,000
26 March 1894	Bolton	H	3–2	Jack Southworth, Abe Hartley, Edgar Chadwick	25,000
7 April 1894	Stoke City	H	6–2	James McMillan, Alex Latta (2), Abe Hartley, Fred Geary	13,000
16 April 1894	Bolton Wanderers	A	1–0	Harry Reay	1,000

=== First Division ===
		P	W	D	L	F	A	GA	Pts
1	Aston Villa	30	19	6	5	84	42	2.000	44
2	Sunderland	30	17	4	9	72	44	1.636	38
3	Derby County	30	16	4	10	73	62	1.177	36
4	Blackburn Rovers	30	16	2	12	69	53	1.302	34
5	Burnley	30	15	4	11	61	51	1.196	34
6	Everton	30	15	3	12	90	57	1.579	33
7	Nottingham Forest	30	14	4	12	57	48	1.188	32
8	West Bromwich Albion	30	14	4	12	66	59	1.119	32
9	Wolverhampton Wanderers	30	14	3	13	52	63	0.825	31
10	Sheffield United	30	13	5	12	47	61	0.770	31
11	Stoke	30	13	3	14	65	79	0.823	29
12	The Wednesday	30	9	8	13	48	57	0.842	26
13	Bolton Wanderers	30	10	4	16	38	52	0.731	24
14	Preston North End	30	10	3	17	44	56	0.786	23
15	Darwen	30	7	5	18	37	83	0.446	19
16	Newton Heath	30	6	2	22	36	72	0.500	14

== Football Association Challenge Cup ==
Date	Round	Opponents	Home/ Away	Result F – A	Scorers	Attendance
27 January 1894	First	Stoke	A	0–1		14,000

== League club records set this season ==
- Most points won at home in a season (23)
- Most home victories in a season (11)
- Equalled most away drawn games in a season (2)
- Most goals scored in a season (90)
- Most goals scored at home in a season (63)
- Most individual goals in a single game (6 by Jack Southworth vs West Bromwich Albion, 30 December 1893)
- Most hat-tricks in a season by the team (4 – includes Southworth's six as a double hat-trick)
- Most individual hat-tricks in a season (3 – Jack Southworth, double hat-trick is counted as two hat-tricks)
- Record scorer for a single season (Jack Southworth; 27)
- Equalled longest sequence of away draws in a season twice (1)

=== Negative records ===
- Most defeats in a season (12)
- Equalled most home defeats in a season (3)
- Most away defeats in a season (9)
- Most goals conceded at home in a season (23)
- Equalled most goals conceded away from home in a season (34)
- Heaviest defeat (3–7 at Derby County; 7 September 1893)
- Second consecutive season with no ever present players
- Equalled longest sequence of consecutive defeats (4)
- Equalled longest sequence of consecutive home defeats (2)
- Longest sequence of consecutive away defeats (4)
- Equalled longest winless away sequence in a season twice (4)
