= 1899–1900 Scottish Cup =

Tournament details
- Country: Scotland

Final positions
- Champions: Celtic
- Runners-up: Queen's Park

The 1899–1900 Scottish Cup was the 27th season of Scotland's most prestigious football knockout competition. The Cup was won by holders Celtic when they beat Queen's Park in the final at the newly built Ibrox Park by a 4–3 scoreline to claim the trophy for a third time overall; it is the last major final to date for Queen's Park who were cup winners ten times in the 19th century.

== Calendar ==
Round	First match date	Fixtures	Clubs
First round	13 January 1900	16	32 → 16
Second round	27 January 1900	8	16 → 8
Quarter-finals	10 February 1900	4	8 → 4
Semi-finals	10 March 1900	2	4 → 2
Final	14 May 1900	1	2 → 1

== First round ==
Home team	Score	Away team
Abercorn (2)	5 – 2	Ayr Parkhouse (NL)
Airdrieonians (2)	0 – 1	Clyde (1)
Celtic (1)	7 – 1	Bo'ness (NL)
Dundee (1)	8 – 0	Douglas Wanderers (NL)
Forfar Athletic (NL)	3 – 4	Motherwell (2)
Forres Mechanics (NL)	1 – 1	Orion (NL)
Galston (NL)	1 – 2	Partick Thistle (2)
Hamilton Academical (2)	2 – 3	Hibernian (1)
Heart of Midlothian (1)	0 – 0	St Mirren (1)
Kilmarnock (1)	2 – 0	East Stirlingshire (NL)
Maybole (NL)	4 – 2	Wishaw (NL)
Port Glasgow Athletic (2)	7 – 1	Falkirk (NL)
Queen's Park (NL)	3 – 0	Leith Athletic (2)
Rangers (1)	4 – 2	Greenock Morton (2)
St Bernard's (1)	1 – 0	Arbroath (NL)
Third Lanark (1)	5 – 1	Raith Rovers (NL)

=== First round replay ===
Home team	Score	Away team
Orion	4 – 1	Forres Mechanics
St Mirren	0 – 3	Heart of Midlothian

== Second round ==
Home team	Score	Away team
Dundee	3 –3	Clyde
Heart of Midlothian	1 – 1	Hibernian
Kilmarnock	10 – 1	Orion
Partick Thistle	2 – 1	St Bernard's
Port Glasgow Athletic	1 – 5	Celtic
Queen's Park	5 – 1	Abercorn
Rangers	12 – 0	Maybole
Third Lanark	2 – 1	Motherwell

=== Second round replay ===
Home team	Score	Away team
Clyde	0 – 3	Dundee
Hibernian	1 – 2	Heart of Midlothian

== Quarter-final ==
Home team	Score	Away team
Celtic	4 – 0	Kilmarnock
Partick Thistle	1 – 6	Rangers
Queen's Park	1 – 0	Dundee
Third Lanark	1 – 2	Heart of Midlothian

== Semi-finals ==
Home team	Score	Away team
Queen's Park	2 – 1	Heart of Midlothian
Rangers	2 – 2	Celtic

=== Semi-final replay ===
Home team	Score	Away team
Celtic	4 – 0	Rangers

== Final ==
14 May 1900

Celtic	4–3	Queen's Park
Divers; Bell; McMahon		Battles (o.g.); W. Stewart; Christie

Ibrox Park, Govan
Attendance: 18,000
Referee: J. Walker

=== Teams ===
Celtic:
GK	Dan McArthur
RB	David Storrier
LB	Barney Battles
RH	Davie Russell
CH	Harry Marshall
LH	Willie Orr
OR	Johnny Hodge
IR	John Campbell
CF	John Divers
IL	Sandy McMahon
OL	Jack Bell

Queen's Park:
GK	David Gourlay
RB	David Stewart
LB	Archie Swann
RH	James Irons
CH	Alex Christie
LH	James Templeton
OR	William Stewart
IR	David Wilson
CF	Robert McColl
IL	Tom Kennedy
OL	Norman Hay

== See also ==
- 1899–1900 in Scottish football
