= 1899–1900 British Home Championship =

Tournament details
- Host country: England, Ireland, Scotland and Wales
- Dates: 3 February – 7 April 1900
- Teams: 4

Final positions
- Champions: Scotland (10th title)
- Runners-up: England

Tournament statistics
- Matches played: 6
- Goals scored: 21 (3.5 per match)
- Top scorer: (Scotland) Bob McColl (3 goals)

The 1899–1900 British Home Championship was an edition of the annual football tournament played between the British Home Nations. Conducted in the second half of the 1899–1900 season, it was dominated by Scotland who achieved a whitewash of their opponents by winning all three games. Wales and England shared second place, with Ireland bringing up the rear.

Wales and Ireland began the competition in Llandudno, the Welsh side winning 2–0 to take immediate advantage. Ireland then returned to Belfast to play Scotland, where they again lost, conceding three without reply. In Cardiff, Wales and England played out a draw giving both a chance of success in the tournament before Wales' hopes were ended by a heavy 5–2 defeat by Scotland in Aberdeen. In the final fixture Scotland were much too strong for England, dominating the match and winning 4–1 to complete three victories and win the competition.

== Table ==
Team	Pld	W	D	L	GF	GA	GD	Pts
Scotland (C)	3	3	0	0	12	3	+9	6
Wales	3	1	1	1	5	6	−1	3
England	3	1	1	1	4	5	−1	3
Ireland	3	0	0	3	0	7	−7	0

Rules for classification: 1) points. The points system worked as follows: 2 points for a win and 1 point for a draw.
(C) Champions

== Results ==
3 February 1900

Scotland	5–2	Wales
Bell 2'; Wilson 7', 35'; RC Hamilton 37'; Smith 61'	Scottish FA	Parry 45'; Butler 60'

Pittodrie, Aberdeen
Attendance: 12,500
Referee: Charles E. Sutcliffe (England)

24 February 1900

Wales	2–0	Ireland
Parry 73'; Meredith 87'

The Oval, Llandudno

3 March 1900

Ireland	0–3	Scotland
	Scottish FA	Campbell 8', 83'; Smith 23'

Solitude, Belfast
Attendance: 6,000
Referee: Charles E. Sutcliffe (England)

17 March 1900

Ireland	0–2	England
		Cochrane 12' (o.g.); Sagar 16'

Lansdowne Road, Dublin

26 March 1900

Wales	1–1	England
Meredith 55'		Wilson 3'

Cardiff Arms Park, Cardiff

7 April 1900

Scotland	4–1	England
McColl 1', 25', 44'; Bell 6'		Steve Bloomer 35'

Celtic Park, Glasgow
Attendance: 63,000
Referee: James Torrans (Ireland)

== Winning squad ==
- Scotland

Name	Apps/Goals by opponent			Total	
Name	(Wales) WAL	(Ireland) IRE	(England) ENG	Apps	Goals
Alex Smith	1/1	1/1	1	3	2
Nicol Smith	1	1	1	3	0
Bob McColl	1		1/3	2	3
Jack Bell	1/1		1/1	2	2
John Campbell		1/2	1	2	2
Neilly Gibson		1	1	2	0
Harry Rennie		1	1	2	0
Jackie Robertson	1		1	2	0
Bobby Walker		1	1	2	0
David Wilson	1/2			1	2
Bob Hamilton	1/1			1	1
Jock Drummond			1	1	0
Alex Raisbeck			1	1	0
David Crawford	1			1	0
Matthew Dickie	1			1	0
James Irons	1			1	0
Bobby Neil	1			1	0
Patrick Callaghan		1		1	0
Robert Glen		1		1	0
Harry Marshall		1		1	0
Willie Orr		1		1	0
William Stewart		1		1	0
