= 1899 Sheriff of London Charity Shield =

- Event: Sheriff of London Charity Shield
Aston Villa	Queen's Park
(England)	(Scotland)
0	0
- Date: 11 March 1899
- Venue: Crystal Palace, London
- Referee: Simpson
- Attendance: 12,000

The 1899 Sheriff of London Charity Shield was the second edition of the Sheriff of London Charity Shield. The match between Queen's Park and league champions Aston Villa was a goalless draw, even following thirty minutes of added time. No replay was agreed between the sides so the honour was shared.

== Match ==
=== Background ===
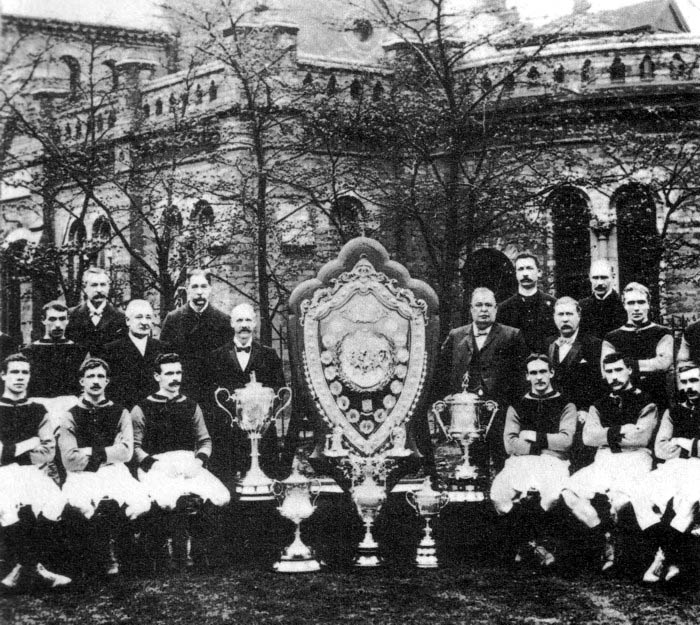
The Aston Villa team of 1899 that won the First Division and shared the Sheriff of London Charity Shield (pictured centre)

Aston Villa were the 1898–99 Football League champions for the fourth time in their history and Queen's Park of Glasgow were selected by the trophy committee as the best amateur side of the year, having defeated Corinthian twice that year (2–3 away and 4–1 at home). This was to be the only time that an amateur side other than Corinthian would contest the trophy, as well as the only game featuring a non-English side.

There was initially some difficulties in arranging the match for 11 March and in February, the match was rearranged to 1 April. Aston Villa had a prior engagement on that date and had they not been able to reschedule, it was believed that Liverpool would have been a candidate to take their place in the charity shield. Several days before the game was originally due to be played, reports suggested that the teams had overcome their difficulties and the original match date of 11 March was back on. Queens Park stipulated that in the event of a draw after 30 minutes extra-time, they would not want a replay but instead to share the shield as making a second trip from Scotland to London was seen as an unnecessary inconvenience.

=== Build-up ===
Queens Park had performed admirably against Scottish professional clubs during the season and the Glasgow Herald suggested that "there is no reason why they should not distinguish themselves equally against the Birmingham cracks", suggesting Queens Park had an excellent chance when drawing conclusions to Aston Villa's recent visit to the Ibrox stadium, where Rangers comfortably beat the visitors.

=== Details ===
11 March 1899

Aston Villa	0–0	Queen's Park

Crystal Palace, London
Attendance: 12,000
Referee: Simpson

Aston Villa
Queen's Park

GK	(England) Billy George
FB	(England) Charlie Aston
FB	(England) Albert Evans
HB	(Scotland) Tommy Bowman
HB	(Scotland) James Cowan
HB	(England) Jimmy Crabtree
FW	(England) Charlie Athersmith
FW	(England) Billy Garraty
FW	(England) George Johnson
FW	(England) Fred Wheldon
FW	(England) Steve Smith
Secretary-Manager:
George Ramsay

GK	(England) Wilf Waller
FB	(Scotland) David Stewart
FB	(Scotland) John Gillespie
HB	(Scotland) James Templeton
HB	(Scotland) Alex Christie
HB	(Scotland) James Irons
FW	(Scotland) William Stewart
FW	(Scotland) David Wilson
FW	(Scotland) Robert McColl
FW	(Scotland) Davidson Berry
FW	(Scotland) Robert Lambie
Manager:

== See also ==
- 1898-99 Aston Villa F.C. season
