= 1902 Scottish Cup final =

1902 Scottish Cup Final
- Event: 1901–02 Scottish Cup
Hibernian	Celtic
1	0
- Date: 26 April 1902
- Venue: Celtic Park, Glasgow
- Attendance: 16,000

The 1902 Scottish Cup Final was played on 26 April 1902 at Celtic Park in Glasgow and was the deciding match of the 29th season of the Scottish Cup. The match had been scheduled to be played at Ibrox Park on 12 April, but the first Ibrox disaster occurred the week earlier during the annual Scotland v England game. This meant that the final was delayed by two weeks and moved to Celtic Park, although Celtic were one of the finalists. Hibernian and Celtic contested the match. Hibernian won the match 1–0, by the 75th-minute goal from Andy McGeachan. This was Hibernian's last Scottish Cup triumph for 114 years, until they won it again in 2016 by beating Rangers 3–2.

== Final ==
26 April 1902

Hibernian	1 – 0	Celtic
McGeachan 75'

Celtic Park, Glasgow
Attendance: 16,000

=== Teams ===
Hibernian:
GK	(Scotland) Harry Rennie
RB	(Scotland) Archie Gray
LB	(Scotland) Robert Glen
RH	(Scotland) Bernard Breslin
CH	(Scotland) Jimmy Harrower
LH	(Scotland) Alex Robertson
OR	(Scotland) Johnny McCall
IR	(Scotland) Andy McGeachan
CF	(Scotland) John Divers
IL	(Scotland) Paddy Callaghan
OL	(Wales) Bobby Atherton
Manager:
(Ireland) Dan McMichael

Celtic:
GK	(Scotland) Rab Macfarlane
RB	(Scotland) Hugh Watson
LB	(Scotland) Barney Battles, Sr.
RH	(Scotland) Willie Loney
CH	(Scotland) Henry Marshall
LH	(Scotland) Willie Orr
OR	(Scotland) William McCafferty
IR	(Scotland) Tommy McDermott
CF	(Scotland) Sandy McMahon
IL	(Scotland) George Livingstone
OL	(Scotland) Jimmy Quinn
Manager:
(Scotland) Willie Maley
