= Robert Glen =

Scottish footballer (1875–1953)

Bob Glen
Personal information
- Full name: Robert Glen
- Date of birth: 16 January 1875
- Place of birth: Renton, Scotland
- Date of death: 16 July 1953 (aged 78)
- Place of death: Toronto, Canada
- Position: Left-back

Senior career*
Years	Team	Apps	(Gls)
1891–1893	Renton	12	(1)
1893–1894	Sheffield Wednesday	1	(0)
1893–1897	Renton	40	(2)
1897–1898	Rangers	6	(0)
1898–1907	Hibernian	139	(0)

International career
1895–1900	Scotland	3	(0)
1900	Scottish League XI	2	(0)
- * Club domestic league appearances and goals

Robert Glen (16 January 1875 – 16 July 1953) was a Scottish footballer who played for Renton, Sheffield Wednesday, Rangers, Hibernian and Scotland.

== Club career ==
Glen started his career with his local club Renton. He briefly left them in 1893 to play for Sheffield Wednesday, but returned later that season. He captained Renton in the 1895 Scottish Cup final, which they lost 2–1 to Edinburgh club St Bernards.

After a brief spell with Rangers, where he was used as a backup for the regular defensive players, Glen joined Hibernian in 1898. They finished third in the league in 1899–1900, but a mistake by Glen contributed to a second-round defeat by Hearts in the Scottish Cup. Hibs only finished sixth in the league in 1901–02, but then went on a prolonged run in the Scottish Cup. Wins against Clyde, Port Glasgow, Queen's Park and Rangers sent Hibs to the final, which was played against Celtic at Celtic Park (neutral Ibrox was intended to be the venue, but part of its terracing collapsed during a Scotland match there in April). Early in the game, Glen succeeded in protecting goalkeeper Harry Rennie. With fifteen minutes remaining, Andrew McGeachen scored the only goal of the match, and Hibs had won the cup. One match report said Glen was the star performer in defence for Hibs, as he would make interceptions "in the nick of time" and would use "trick" plays like overhead kicks to get the ball to safety. A few weeks later he was in the side that defeated the same opposition 6–2 to win the Glasgow Merchants Charity Cup (in that year only, entry was extended to clubs outwith that city to boost the income for the Ibrox Disaster Relief Fund).

Glen also helped the club win the Scottish League championship in 1902–03, although he made only three appearances that season due to injury. After spending the best part of nine seasons with Hibs, he played some further games for Renton, by now competing in the minor Scottish Football Union competition. Soon afterwards he emigrated with his family to Canada, where he worked as a bricklayer.

== International career ==
Glen made his full international debut for Scotland on 23 March 1895, in a 2–2 draw with Wales at the Racecourse Ground. He made two further appearances for Scotland, in a 4–0 win against the same opponents on 21 March 1896, and a 3–0 win against Ireland on 3 March 1900. He also played in an unofficial game for Scotland against Ireland on 9 August 1902, a match that also raised funds for victims of the Ibrox Disaster.

== Style of play ==
Glen played as a left-back, and was known for his strength and the intelligence of his play. At the time of the 1902 Scottish Cup final, he was a favourite player of the Hibs supporters and had been on good form leading up to the final.
