= 1897 FA Cup final =

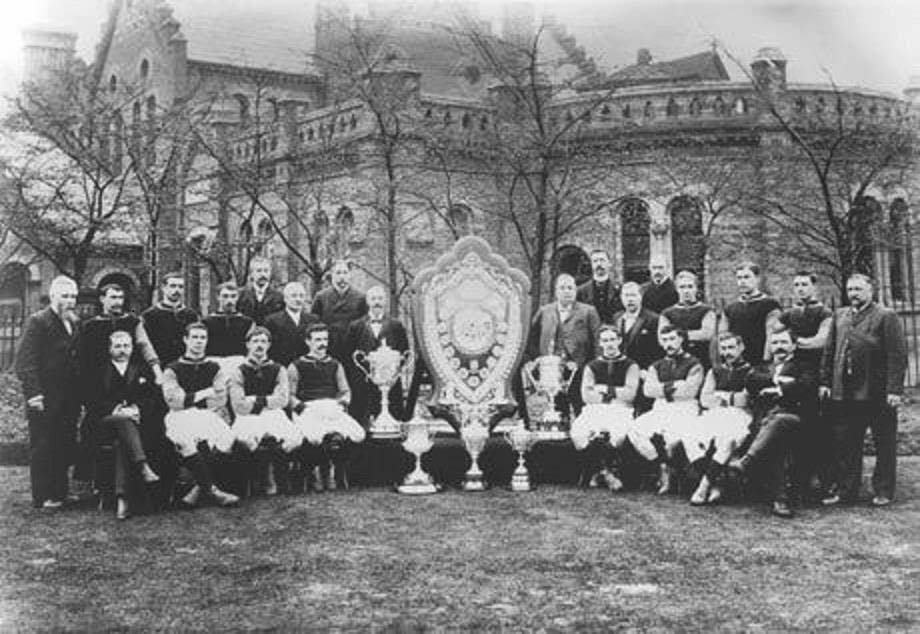
- The Aston Villa team of 1897 that won The Double
- Event: 1896–97 FA Cup
Aston Villa	Everton
3	2
- Date: 10 April 1897
- Venue: Crystal Palace, London
- Referee: J. Lewis
- Attendance: 65,891

The 1897 FA Cup final was contested by Aston Villa and Everton at Crystal Palace. Aston Villa won 3–2, with goals by John Campbell, Fred Wheldon and Jimmy Crabtree. Everton's goals came from Jack Bell and Dickie Boyle.

With results elsewhere going their way, Villa confirmed their status as League champions on this day. This makes them the only team to date to achieve the league and cup "double" on the same day.

== Match details ==
1896–97 FA Cup Final
10 April 1897
15:00 GMT

Aston Villa	3–2	Everton
Campbell 18'; Wheldon 35'; Crabtree 44'	Report	Bell 23'; Boyle 28'

Crystal Palace, London
Attendance: 65,891
Referee: J. Lewis

Aston Villa	Everton

GK	Jimmy Whitehouse
DF	Howard Spencer
DF	Jack Reynolds
MF	Albert Evans
MF	James Cowan
MF	Jimmy Crabtree
FW	Charlie Athersmith
FW	John Devey (c)
FW	John Campbell
FW	Fred Wheldon
FW	John Cowan
Secretary-Manager:
George Ramsay

GK	Bob Menham
DF	Peter Meehan
DF	David Storrier
MF	Dickie Boyle
MF	Johnny Holt
MF	Billy Stewart (c)
FW	Jack Taylor
FW	Jack Bell
FW	Abe Hartley
FW	Edgar Chadwick
FW	Alf Milward
Manager:
Dick Molyneux
