= 1898–99 Scottish Cup =

Tournament details
- Country: Scotland

Final positions
- Champions: Celtic
- Runners-up: Rangers

The 1898–99 Scottish Cup was the 26th season of Scotland's most prestigious football knockout competition. The cup was won by Celtic when they beat holders Rangers 2–0 in the final at the second Hampden Park to claim victory in the competition for the second time.

== Calendar ==
| Round | First match date | Fixtures | Clubs |
|---|---|---|---|
| First round | 14 January 1899 | 16 | 32 → 16 |
| Second round | 11 February 1899 | 8 | 16 → 8 |
| Quarter-finals | 18 February 1899 | 4 | 8 → 4 |
| Semi-finals | 11 March 1899 | 2 | 4 → 2 |
| Final | 22 April 1899 | 1 | 2 → 1 |

== First round ==
| Home team | Score | Away team |
|---|---|---|
| Airdrieonians | 3 – 3 | Arbroath |
| Ayr Parkhouse | 3 – 1 | Dundee |
| Clyde | 3 – 0 | Wishaw Thistle |
| East Stirlingshire | 4 – 1 | Dumbarton |
| Bo'ness | 3 – 3 | St Bernard's |
| Hibernian | 2 – 1 | Royal Albert |
| Forfar Athletic | 4 – 5 | West Calder |
| Greenock Morton | 3 – 1 | Annbank |
| Orion | 0 – 2 | Kilmarnock |
| Partick Thistle | 5 – 0 | Irvine |
| Port Glasgow Athletic | 3 – 2 | Renton |
| Queen's Park | 4 – 0 | Kilsyth Wanderers |
| Rangers | 4 – 1 | Heart of Midlothian |
| 6th GRV | 1 – 8 | Celtic |
| St Mirren | 7 – 1 | Leith Athletic |
| Third Lanark | 4 – 1 | Arthurlie |

=== First round replay ===
| Home team | Score | Away team |
|---|---|---|
| Arbroath | 3 – 2 | Airdrieonians |
| St Bernard's | 4 – 2 | Bo'ness |

== Second round ==
| Home team | Score | Away team |
|---|---|---|
| Ayr Parkhouse | 1 – 4 | Rangers |
| Celtic | 3 – 0 | St Bernard's |
| Clyde | 3 – 1 | Arbroath |
| East Stirlingshire | 1 – 1 | Kilmarnock |
| Partick Thistle | 2 – 2 | Greenock Morton |
| Port Glasgow Athletic | 3 – 1 | West Calder |
| Queen's Park | 5 – 1 | Hibernian |
| St Mirren | 2 – 1 | Third Lanark |

=== Second round replay ===
| Home team | Score | Away team |
|---|---|---|
| Kilmarnock | 0 – 0 | East Stirlingshire |
| Greenock Morton | 1 – 2 | Partick Thistle |

=== Second round second replay ===
| Home team | Score | Away team |
|---|---|---|
| Kilmarnock | 4 – 2 | East Stirlingshire |

== Quarter-final ==
| Home team | Score | Away team |
|---|---|---|
| Kilmarnock | 1 – 2 | St Mirren |
| Queen's Park | 2 – 4 | Celtic * |
| Port Glasgow Athletic | 7 – 3 | Partick Thistle |
| Rangers | 4 – 0 | Clyde |

- Game Abandoned

=== Quarter-final replay ===
| Home team | Score | Away team |
|---|---|---|
| Celtic | 2 – 1 | Queen's Park |

== Semi-finals ==
| Home team | Score | Away team |
|---|---|---|
| Celtic | 4 – 2 | Port Glasgow Athletic |
| St Mirren | 1 – 2 | Rangers |

== Final ==
22 April 1899

| Celtic | 2 – 0 | Rangers |
|---|---|---|
| Hodge; McMahon |

[2nd] Hampden Park
Attendance: 25,000

=== Teams ===
Celtic:
| GK | Dan McArthur |
| RB | James Welford |
| LB | David Storrier |
| RH | Barney Battles |
| CH | Harry Marshall |
| LH | Alex King |
| OR | Johnny Hodge |
| IR | John Campbell |
| CF | John Divers |
| IL | Sandy McMahon |
| OL | Jack Bell |

Rangers:
| GK | Matthew Dickie |
| RB | Nicol Smith |
| LB | Davie Crawford |
| RH | Neilly Gibson |
| CH | Bobby Neil |
| LH | David Mitchell |
| OR | John Campbell |
| IR | John McPherson |
| CF | Robert Hamilton |
| IL | Jimmy Millar |
| OL | Alec Smith |

== See also ==
- 1898–99 in Scottish football
