= 1899–1900 in Scottish football =

Football in Scotland
- Season: 1899–1900

1899–1900 in Scottish football

Division One champions
- Rangers

Division Two champions
- Partick Thistle

Scottish Cup winners
- Celtic

Junior Cup winners
- Maryhill

Scotland national team
- 1900 BHC

The season of 1899–1900 in Scottish football was the 27th season of competitive football in Scotland and the tenth season of the Scottish Football League.

== League competitions ==
=== Scottish Division One ===
Rangers were champions of the Scottish Division One.

Pos	Team	Pld	W	D	L	GF	GA	GD	Pts	Qualification or relegation
1	Rangers (C)	18	15	2	1	69	27	+42	32	Champions
2	Celtic	18	9	7	2	46	27	+19	25	
3	Hibernian	18	9	6	3	43	24	+19	24	
4	Heart of Midlothian	18	10	3	5	41	24	+17	23	
5	Kilmarnock	18	6	6	6	30	37	−7	18	
6	Dundee	18	4	7	7	36	39	−3	15	
6	Third Lanark	18	5	5	8	31	38	−7	15	
8	St Mirren	18	3	6	9	30	46	−16	12	
8	St Bernard's (R)	18	4	4	10	29	47	−18	12	Relegated to the 1900–01 Scottish Division Two
10	Clyde (R)	18	2	0	16	24	70	−46	4	Relegated to the 1900–01 Scottish Division Two

Source: "1899-1900 Division 1 - SPFL Archive". SPFL.
Rules for classification: Teams finish equal if level on points. Points system: 2 points for a win, 1 point for a draw, 0 points for a loss
(C) Champions; (R) Relegated

=== Scottish Division Two ===
Partick Thistle won the Scottish Division Two.

Pos	Team	Pld	W	D	L	GF	GA	GD	Pts	Promotion or relegation
1	Partick Thistle (C, P)	18	14	1	3	55	26	+29	29	Promoted to the 1900–01 Scottish Division One
2	Morton (P)	18	14	0	4	66	25	+41	28	Promoted to the 1900–01 Scottish Division One
3	Port Glasgow Athletic	18	10	0	8	50	41	+9	20	
4	Leith Athletic	18	9	1	8	32	37	−5	19	
4	Motherwell	18	9	1	8	38	36	+2	19	
6	Abercorn	18	7	2	9	46	39	+7	16	
7	Hamilton Academical	18	7	1	10	33	45	−12	15	
8	Ayr	18	6	2	10	39	48	−9	14	
9	Airdrieonians	18	4	3	11	27	49	−22	11	
10	Linthouse (R)	18	2	5	11	28	68	−40	9	Failed re-election (Note: Linthouse failed re-election to compete in the next season and were replaced by East Stirlingshire.)

Source: statto.com
Rules for classification: Teams finish equal if level on points. Points system: 2 points for a win, 1 point for a draw, 0 points for a loss
(C) Champions; (P) Promoted; (R) Relegated

== Other honours ==
=== Cup honours ===
==== National ====
Competition	Winner	Score	Runner-up
Scottish Cup	Celtic	4 – 3	Queen's Park.
Scottish Qualifying Cup	Galston	5 – 2	Arbroath
Scottish Junior Cup	Maryhill	3 – 2	Rugby XI

==== County ====
Competition (Note: The Linlithgowshire Cup was not held.)	Winner	Score	Runner-up
Aberdeenshire Cup	Victoria United	5 – 2	Peterhead
Ayrshire Cup	Kilmarnock	4 – 0	Ayr Parkhouse
Border Cup	Vale of Leithen	2 – 1	Duns
Dumbartonshire Cup	Vale of Leven	5 – 3	Renton
East of Scotland Shield	Hibernian	3 – 0	Hearts
Forfarshire Cup	Arbroath	1 – 0 (Note: Replay needed.)	Lochee United
Fife Cup	Cup withheld		
Glasgow Cup	Rangers	1 – 0	Celtic
Lanarkshire Cup	Albion Rovers	2 – 1	Royal Albert
North of Scotland Cup	Clachnacuddin	3 – 2	Inverness Caledonian
Perthshire Cup	Dunblane	7 – 2	Fair City Athletic
Renfrewshire Cup	Port Glasgow Athletic	4 – 3 (Note: Aggregate over two legs.)	Morton
Southern Counties Cup	Dumfries	4 – 2	6th GRV
Stirlingshire Cup	Stenhousemuir	2 – 1	Camelon

=== Non-league honours ===
Highland League

Top three
Pos	Team	Pld	W	D	L	GF	GA	GD	Pts
1	Inverness Caledonian	10	9	0	1	29	7	+22	18
2	Clachnacuddin	10	6	2	2	26	12	+14	14
3	Inverness Thistle	10	6	2	2	24	10	+14	14

Source: RSSSF

Other Senior Leagues

Division	Winner
Central Combination	Falkirk
Northern League	Dundee Wanderers
Perthshire League	unfinished
Scottish Combination	Queen's Park Strollers

== Scotland national team ==
Date	Venue	Opponents	Score (Note: "Scotland's score is shown first.)	Competition	Scotland scorer(s)
3 February	Pittodrie, Aberdeen (H)	Wales	5–2	BHC	David Wilson (2), Jack Bell, Alexander Smith, Robert Hamilton
3 March	Solitude Ground, Belfast (A)	Ireland	3–0	BHC	Alexander Smith, John Campbell (2)
7 April	Celtic Park, Glasgow (H)	England	4–1	BHC	Robert Smyth McColl (3), Jack Bell

Scotland were winners of the 1900 British Home Championship, having won all three of their matches.

Key:

- (H) = Home match
- (A) = Away match
- BHC = British Home Championship

Team	Pld	W	D	L	GF	GA	GD	Pts
Scotland (C)	3	3	0	0	12	3	+9	6
Wales	3	1	1	1	5	6	−1	3
England	3	1	1	1	4	5	−1	3
Ireland	3	0	0	3	0	7	−7	0

Rules for classification: 1) points. The points system worked as follows: 2 points for a win and 1 point for a draw.
(C) Champions

== Other national teams ==
=== Scottish League XI ===
Date	Venue	Opponents	Score (Note: Scottish League XI's score is shown first.)	Scotland scorer(s)
17 February	Easter Road, Edinburgh (H)	(Northern Ireland) Irish League XI	6–0	D.S. Campbell (3), John Hodge (2), John Neilson
31 March	Crystal Palace, London (A)	(England) Football League XI	2–2	Bobby Walker, ?

== See also ==
- 1899–1900 Rangers F.C. season
