= 1896–97 FA Cup =

Tournament details
- Country: England; Wales

Final positions
- Champions: Aston Villa (3rd title)
- Runners-up: Everton

The 1896–97 FA Cup was the 26th season of the world's oldest association football competition, the Football Association Challenge Cup (more usually known as the FA Cup). The cup was won by Aston Villa, who defeated Everton 3–2 in the final of the competition, played at Crystal Palace in London. In doing so, Aston Villa became only the second team to have won the Double, as they won the league on the same day as their cup victory (and the only team to do this).

Matches were scheduled to be played at the stadium of the team named first on the date specified for each round, which was always a Saturday. If scores were level after 90 minutes had been played, a replay would take place at the stadium of the second-named team later the same week. If the replayed match was drawn further replays would be held at neutral venues until a winner was determined. If scores were level after 90 minutes had been played in a replay, a 30-minute period of extra time would be played.

== Calendar ==
The format of the FA Cup for the season had a preliminary round, five qualifying rounds (for the first time), three proper rounds, and the semi-finals and final. Each of the Rounds Proper were played on a set date, whereas the Preliminary and Qualifying Round matches were played on several dates over a given period of time.

| Round | Start date | End date |
|---|---|---|
| Preliminary round | Saturday 10 October 1896 | |
| First round qualifying | Saturday 10 October 1896 | 31 October |
| Second round qualifying | Saturday 31 October 1896 | 21 November |
| Third round qualifying | Saturday 21 November 1896 | 12 December |
| Fourth round qualifying | Saturday 12 December 1896 | 2 January |
| Fifth round Qualifying | Saturday 2 January 1897 | 16 January |
| First round proper | Saturday 30 January 1897 | |
| Second round proper | Saturday 13 February 1897 | |
| Third round proper | Saturday 27 February 1897 | |
| Semi-finals | Saturday 20 March 1897 | |
| Final | Saturday 10 April 1897 | |

== Qualifying rounds ==
The 16 First Division sides were given byes to the first round, as were Notts County, Small Heath, Burton Wanderers, Grimsby Town, Newcastle United and Manchester City from the Second Division. The other Second Division sides were entered into the third qualifying round. Of those sides, only Newton Heath and Burton Swifts qualified for the main competition. Non-league sides Stockton, Barnsley St Peter's, Heanor Town, Glossop North End, Kettering, Luton Town, Millwall Athletic and Southampton St Mary's also qualified, with only Glossop North End appearing at this stage for the first time.

== First round proper ==
The first round proper contained 16 ties between 32 teams. The matches were played on Saturday, 30 January 1897. One match was drawn, with the replay taking place in the following midweek fixture.

| Tie no | Home team | Score | Away team | Date |
|---|---|---|---|---|
| 1 | Liverpool | 4–3 | Burton Swifts | 30 January 1897 |
| 2 | Preston North End | 6–0 | Manchester City | 30 January 1897 |
| 3 | Stoke | 5–2 | Glossop North End | 30 January 1897 |
| 4 | Blackburn Rovers | 2–1 | Sheffield United | 30 January 1897 |
| 5 | Aston Villa | 5–0 | Newcastle United | 30 January 1897 |
| 6 | The Wednesday | 0–1 | Nottingham Forest | 30 January 1897 |
| 7 | Grimsby Town | 0–0 | Bolton Wanderers | 30 January 1897 |
| Replay | Bolton Wanderers | 3–3 | Grimsby Town | 8 February 1897 |
| Replay | Bolton Wanderers | 3–2 | Grimsby Town | 11 February 1897 |
| 8 | Sunderland | 1–0 | Burnley | 30 January 1897 |
| 9 | Derby County | 8–1 | Barnsley St Peter's | 30 January 1897 |
| 10 | Luton Town | 0–1 | West Bromwich Albion | 30 January 1897 |
| 11 | Everton | 5–2 | Burton Wanderers | 30 January 1897 |
| 12 | Newton Heath | 5–1 | Kettering | 30 January 1897 |
| 13 | Stockton | 0–0 | Bury | 30 January 1897 |
| Replay | Bury | 12–1 | Stockton | 2 February 1897 |
| 14 | Small Heath | 1–2 | Notts County | 30 January 1897 |
| 15 | Millwall Athletic | 1–2 | Wolverhampton Wanderers | 30 January 1897 |
| 16 | Southampton St Mary's | 1–1 | Heanor Town | 30 January 1897 |
| Replay | Heanor Town | 0–1 | Southampton St Mary's | 3 February 1897 |

== Second round proper ==
The eight Second Round matches were scheduled for Saturday, 13 February 1897. There was one replay, played in the following midweek fixture.

| Tie no | Home team | Score | Away team | Date |
|---|---|---|---|---|
| 1 | Preston North End | 2–1 | Stoke | 13 February 1897 |
| 2 | Blackburn Rovers | 2–1 | Wolverhampton Wanderers | 13 February 1897 |
| 3 | Aston Villa | 2–1 | Notts County | 13 February 1897 |
| 4 | West Bromwich Albion | 1–2 | Liverpool | 13 February 1897 |
| 5 | Sunderland | 1–3 | Nottingham Forest | 13 February 1897 |
| 6 | Derby County | 4–1 | Bolton Wanderers | 13 February 1897 |
| 7 | Everton | 3–0 | Bury | 13 February 1897 |
| 8 | Southampton St Mary's | 1–1 | Newton Heath | 13 February 1897 |
| Replay | Newton Heath | 3–1 | Southampton St Mary's | 17 February 1897 |

== Third round proper ==
The four Third Round matches were scheduled for Saturday, 27 February 1897. There were two replays, played in the following midweek fixture, of which the Preston North End – Aston Villa match went to a second replay the following week.

| Tie no | Home team | Score | Away team | Date |
|---|---|---|---|---|
| 1 | Liverpool | 1–1 | Nottingham Forest | 27 February 1897 |
| Replay | Nottingham Forest | 0–1 | Liverpool | 3 March 1897 |
| 2 | Preston North End | 1–1 | Aston Villa | 27 February 1897 |
| Replay | Aston Villa | 0–0 | Preston North End | 3 March 1897 |
| Replay | Aston Villa | 3–2 | Preston North End | 8 March 1897 |
| 3 | Derby County | 2–0 | Newton Heath | 27 February 1897 |
| 4 | Everton | 2–0 | Blackburn Rovers | 27 February 1897 |

== Semi-finals ==
The semi-final matches were both played on Saturday, 20 March 1897. Aston Villa and Everton went on to meet in the final at Crystal Palace.

20 March 1897

| Aston Villa | 3–0 | Liverpool |

Bramall Lane, Sheffield

20 March 1897

| Everton | 3–2 | Derby County |

Victoria Ground, Stoke

== Final ==
The final took place on Saturday, 10 April 1897 at Crystal Palace. Just under 66,000 supporters attended the match. John Campbell opened the scoring for Villa after 18 minutes. Villa's lead was maintained for only five minutes before Everton equalised, through a goal from Jack Bell. Everton then went in front after Dickie Boyle scored five minutes later, but that lead only lasted seven minutes, when Fred Wheldon got an equaliser. Jimmy Crabtree put Villa back in front just before half-time, and Villa managed to come through the second half without conceding, meaning they had become only the second team ever to win the Double in England.

=== Match details ===
10 April 1897
15:00 GMT

| Aston Villa | 3–2 | Everton |
|---|---|---|
| Campbell 18'; Wheldon 35'; Crabtree 44' | | Bell 23'; Dickie Boyle 28' |

Crystal Palace, London
Attendance: 65,891
Referee: J. Lewis

| Aston Villa | Everton |

== See also ==
- FA Cup Final Results 1872–
