= Andrew Stewart (footballer) =

Scottish footballer

Personal information
- Full name: Andrew Stewart
- Date of birth: 26 September 1871
- Place of birth: Gorbals, Scotland
- Date of death: 23 August 1939 (aged 67)
- Place of death: Helensburgh, Scotland
- Position: Outside right

Senior career*
Years	Team	Apps	(Gls)
- Minerva
1890–1892	Third Lanark	0	(0)
1892–1893	Partick Thistle		
1893–1895	Third Lanark	16	(8)
- Queen's Park
1896–1897	St Bernard's	2	(0)

International career
1894	Scotland	1	(0)
- * Club domestic league appearances and goals

Andrew Stewart (26 September 1871 – 23 August 1939) was a Scottish footballer who played as an outside right.

== Career ==
Stewart played club football for Partick Thistle, Third Lanark, Queen's Park (Note: The Queen's Park archive website does not have an individual list of appearances for Stewart, who featured on an irregular basis. It is possible that some matches he did play in were attributed to William Stewart (no relation), a more prominent player in the same position.) and St Bernard's, with his status as an amateur allowing him to move fairly freely between clubs. He made one appearance for Scotland in 1894.

His elder brother David was also a footballer with Queen's Park and Scotland.
