= Association Footballers' Union =

Former trade union of the United Kingdom

The Association Footballers' Union (the AFU), formed in England in 1898, was the first attempt by football players in the United Kingdom to organize themselves into a union.

The AFU was formed in response to the introduction by the Football League of the "retain and transfer" system which restricted the movement of players from one club to another, and proposals to introduce a maximum wage of £4 per week.

The AFU was short-lived and failed to achieve any of its objectives. The AFU was dissolved in 1901, the same year in which the Football League introduced the maximum wage.

== Background ==
In 1885, faced with the threat of a breakaway British Football Association by 31 clubs, the Football Association (FA) relented to professional players being paid by their clubs for playing. Even then, the vast majority of players had other employment and only supplemented their wages by playing football.

Soon after, the FA introduced a registration system for players. Before that, a player could agree to play one or more games for any football club. After the FA recognized professionalism in 1885, it sought to control professional players by introducing a player registration system. Players had to register with a club each season, even if they remained with the same club from the season before. A player was not allowed to play until he was registered for that season. Once a player was registered with a club, he was not allowed to be registered with or play for another club during the same season without the permission of the FA and the club that held his registration. However, players were free to join another club before the start of each season, even if their former club wished to retain them.

The need for regular fixtures to earn sufficient revenue to afford player wages led to the formation of the Football League in 1888. As the Football League grew in popularity, the leading players of the day were in great demand and commanded ever-increasing wages. Players signed annual contracts with their clubs. If a club wished to retain a player for the following season, it would offer him a new contract. If the player declined the new contract, he could sign a contract with another club, and the player would be registered with the new club. Major reasons a player might move to a new club are that the club is more successful or that it was prepared to pay him a higher wage.

Smaller clubs became concerned about the growing imbalance in the game. They feared that bigger clubs would dominate the league as a consequence of being able to pay higher salaries. The Football League also took the view that a spread of talent was necessary to sustain the interest of spectators.

The Football League decided that restrictions had to be placed on the ability of richer clubs to lure players from other clubs. From the start of the 1893–94 season onwards, once a player was registered with a Football League club, he could not be registered with any other club, even in subsequent seasons, without the permission of the club he was registered with. It applied even if the player's annual contract with the club holding his registration was not renewed after it expired. The club was not obliged to play him, and, without a contract, the player was not entitled to receive a salary. Nevertheless, if the club refused to release his registration, the player could not play for any other Football League club. The Football League's regulations came to be known as the "retain and transfer" system.

Faced with such a situation, a player had the following stark choices:

1. Move to a club in the Southern League, a semi-professional league formed in England in 1894, or the Scottish Football League (SFL) formed in 1890, where equivalent restrictions on movement had not yet been introduced. However, until the turn of the century, both the standard of play and wages were lower in these other leagues compared to the Football League.
2. Quit playing football altogether and return to other full-time employment.

In September, 1893, Derby County proposed that the Football League should impose a maximum wage of £4 a week. At the time, most players were only part-time professionals and still had other jobs. These players did not receive as much as £4 a week and therefore the matter did not greatly concern them. However, a minority of players,were so good they were able to obtain as much as £10 a week. This proposal posed a serious threat to their income.

In 1897, the SFL introduced regulation to prevent its members from employing players still registered with Football League clubs, further restricting movement by players in the Football League.

== Formation of the AFU ==
In February 1898, at a meeting in Liverpool, some of the top players of the day announced the formation of the AFU. Jack Bell, the Everton forward and Scottish international, was the first chairman. John Cameron, also an Everton forward and Scottish international, was the first secretary. John Cameron announced that the union had 250 members.

Other leading players involved in the formation of the AFU or who took a leading role included Bob Holmes and Jimmy Ross of Burnley, John Devey of Aston Villa, John Somerville of Bolton Wanderers, Hugh McNeill of Sunderland, Harry Wood of Wolverhampton Wanderers, Tom Bradshaw and Abe Hartley of Liverpool, James McNaught of Newton Heath, Billy Meredith of Manchester City and Johnny Holt and David Storrier of Everton.

John Cameron also stated that the AFU "wanted any negotiations regarding transfers to be between the interested club and the player concerned - not between club and club with the player excluded".

However, neither the Football Association, nor the Football League recognized the AFU.

== Failure of the AFU ==
In 1900, at the behest of Stoke City, the Football Association placed a maximum wage in its statutes. It was removed from the Football Association's statutes in 1904.

In 1901, the Football League itself introduced the maximum wage of £4 per week in its regulations. It also abolished the paying of all bonuses to players. The AFU was dissolved in the same year, having failed to achieve its objectives.

One reason the AFU failed was that the players of the day were not all full-time professionals. The vast majority of players in the Football League had other employment and only supplemented their wages by playing football.

An example of this was Steve Bloomer of Derby County, who, in the 1890s, was also employed at the foundry near to the club's ground as a striker. Both the football club and the foundry were owned by Francis Ley at the time. Only when he was earning a significant figure as an international player and Derby regular was he able to forgo his other employment and play football full-time.

Most players at the time earned less than £4 a week and were not have been affected by the implementation of a maximum wage. Further, players earning less than the maximum wage did not want to offend their employers. If they were released by their club, there was no guarantee they would find another club willing to employ them, and they would have to return to other full-time employment.

Support for the AFU came mainly from the highest paid players. However, many of them, including members of the AFU committee, subsequently moved to clubs in the Southern League or the Scottish League, such as:

Jack Bell and David Storrier to Celtic of the Scottish League;
John Cameron and Tom Bradshaw to Tottenham Hotspur of the Southern League;
Harry Wood and Abe Hartley to Southampton of the Southern League; and
Johnny Holt to the Reading of the Southern League.

Charles Saer, who replaced John Cameron as secretary of the AFU, resigned in December 1898, "as his scholastic duties precluded the possibility of his devoting the necessary time to the office". A former player with Blackburn Rovers, Saer was working as a schoolteacher. His negotiations with the Football League had ended in failure.

When Bob Holmes was interviewed by the Lancashire Daily Post, he stated:

"I am not quite sure that we shall succeed in attaining all the objects with which we set out; it is not a certainty that we shall carry any... The break-up of the Everton team as we knew it last season may have a good deal in influencing the future of the Union. With John Cameron, Jack Bell, Robertson, Holt, Stewart, Storrier, and Meecham of Everton as well as Hartley and Bradshaw of Liverpool gone, our centre has lost strength. Liverpool was our headquarters, you know, and our registered offices were there. But the secretary, John Cameron, has gone to London, and Bell, the chairman, will not, as far as I know, play for anybody."

== Aftermath ==
It was another 6 years before professional footballers in England tried to organize themselves in a union, with the formation of the Association of Football Players' and Trainers' Union (the AFPTU, commonly referred to as the Players' Union), the old name for what is currently the Professional Footballers' Association.
