= Allan Maxwell =

Scottish footballer

Personal information
- Full name: Allan Maxwell
- Date of birth: 2 April 1869
- Place of birth: Motherwell, Scotland
- Date of death: 1956 (aged 86–87)
- Place of death: New Lexington, Ohio, United States
- Position: Forward

Senior career*
Years	Team	Apps	(Gls)
1890–1891	Cambuslang	13	(5)
1891–1893	Everton	43	(13)
1893–1895	Darwen	60	(22)
1895–1897	Stoke	31	(4)
1897–1898	St Bernard's	4	(1)
Total		151	(45)
- * Club domestic league appearances and goals

Allan Maxwell (2 April 1869 – 1956) was a Scottish footballer who played in the Football League for Darwen, Everton and Stoke.

== Career ==
Maxwell was born in Motherwell (though resided mainly in Hamilton in his youth) and played for Cambuslang in the inaugural season of the Scottish Football League, also featuring in the Glasgow FA v Sheffield FA challenge fixture, before joining English club Everton in 1891, along with goalkeeper Archibald Pinnell.

He spent three years at Everton during the period when they moved from Anfield to Goodison Park, scoring 15 goals, and helped them reach the 1893 FA Cup Final where he played in a 1–0 defeat to Wolverhampton Wanderers. He joined Darwen in 1893 and spent another three years with the struggling Lancashire club before he was subject to a bizarre transfer to Stoke: instead of requesting an amount of money for Maxwell, Darwen instead wanted Stoke to provide them with a new set of wrought iron gates. He spent two seasons with Stoke, making 37 appearances and scoring six goals, before returning to Scotland with St Bernard's. He soon emigrated to the United States in 1902 and remained living there until his death.

== Career statistics ==
Appearances and goals by club, season and competition
Club	Season	League			FA Cup		Test Match		Total	
Club	Season	Division	Apps	Goals	Apps	Goals	Apps	Goals	Apps	Goals
Everton	1891–92	Football League	16	4	0	0	—		16	4
Everton	1892–93	First Division	23	7	7	3	—		30	10
Everton	1893–94	First Division	4	2	0	0	—		4	2
Everton	Total		43	13	7	3	—		50	16
Darwen	1893–94	First Division	16	3	1	0	1	1	18	4
Darwen	1894–95	Second Division	27	12	2	0	—		29	12
Darwen	1895–96	Second Division	17	7	0	0	—		17	0
Darwen	Total		60	22	3	0	1	1	64	23
Stoke	1895–96	First Division	8	1	4	2	—		12	3
Stoke	1896–97	First Division	23	3	2	0	—		25	3
Stoke	Total		31	4	6	2	—		37	6
Career total			134	39	16	5	1	1	151	45
