= Daniel McArthur =

Scottish footballer

Personal information
- Full name: Daniel McArthur
- Date of birth: 9 August 1867
- Place of birth: Bargeddie, Scotland
- Date of death: 11 November 1943 (aged 76)
- Place of death: Shettleston, Scotland
- Position: Goalkeeper

Senior career*
Years	Team	Apps	(Gls)
–	Parkhead		
1892–1903	Celtic	104	(0)
1903–1904	Clyde	3	(0)
Total		107	(0)

International career
1895–1899	Scotland	3	(0)
1895–1897	Scottish League XI	4	(0)
- * Club domestic league appearances and goals

Daniel McArthur (9 August 1867 – 11 November 1943) was a Scottish footballer who played as a goalkeeper for Celtic, Clyde and Scotland. With Celtic, he won the Scottish Football League title in 1895–96 and 1897–98 and the Scottish Cup in 1899 and 1900.
