= William Campbell (footballer) =

Scottish footballer

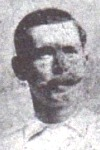

Personal information
- Full name: William Cecil Campbell
- Date of birth: 25 October 1865
- Place of birth: Inverness, Scotland
- Date of death: Unknown
- Position: Forward

Senior career*
| Years | Team | Apps | (Gls) |
| 1890 | Royal Arsenal | 0 | (0) |
| 1890–1891 | Preston North End | 4 | (4) |
| 1891–1892 | Middlesbrough | | |
| 1892–1893 | Darwen | 22 | (8) |
| 1893 | Blackburn Rovers | 1 | (0) |
| 1893–1894 | Newton Heath | 5 | (1) |
| 1894 | Notts County | 0 | (0) |
- Newark
| 1896–1897 | Everton | 3 | (1) |
- * Club domestic league appearances and goals

William Cecil Campbell (25 October 1865 – ?) was a Scottish footballer. His regular position was as a forward. He was born in Inverness.

He started his career at Royal Arsenal, joining in 1890 and making his debut in a September 1890 friendly against the 93rd Highlanders. Described as "an extrovert and a crowd pleaser", his stay at Arsenal was brief and by the end of the year he had joined Preston North End as a replacement for John Goodall. However he was regarded as an "enthusiastic novice" and quickly dropped by Preston, leaving the club in February 1891.

Campbell went on to have a brief spell at Middlesbrough before settling at Second Division Darwen. However he was suspended at the end of the 1892–93 season for a misdemeanour, delaying his transfer to Blackburn Rovers until October 1893. He lasted barely a month at Blackburn before being transferred again to Newton Heath. His stay at Newton Heath lasted just three months, before he joined Notts County, his fourth club that season, in February 1894.

In May 1894, he was suspended by The Football League for two years for illegally approaching his former Blackburn teammate John Murray for transfer and he played for two years in non-league football.

He played for Everton in the 1896–97 season.
