= Musselburgh F.C. =

Former association football club in Scotland

Musselburgh
- Full name: Musselburgh F.C.
- Nickname(s): the Esksiders
- Founded: 1912
- Dissolved: 1913
- Ground: Mall Park
- Secretary: James Minty
- Manager: Harry Marshall
Home colours

Musselburgh Football Club was an association football club from Musselburgh in East Lothian, which had a successful season in 1912–13, but could not survive the conviction of the club secretary for embezzlement.

== History ==
The club was set up in May 1912 in order to bring senior football to the town. Goalkeeper Willie Muir, previously involved with Heart of Midlothian and Dundee, became interim president. The club set out its ambition by recruiting the former international (and Celtic and Heart of Midlothian) centre-half Harry Marshall as trainer.

In August 1912, the club joined the Scottish Football Association, and entered the newly revived Eastern League and Scottish Qualifying Cup for the 1912–13 season. It set itself up as a limited liability company in the same month 1912 albeit with only two subscribers.

The club opened the renovated Mall Park with a League match against Hearts of Beath on 17 August. The first match was a major success, a crowd of 1,000 seeing Gordon score a hat-trick in a 4–0 win. The club's first cup tie, in the East of Scotland Qualifying Cup, at Broxburn Shamrock, was notable for Muir saving two penalties, and ended level; Musselburgh won the replay en route to the semi-final, where the club lost to Armadale.

Shamrock gained revenge in the first round of the King Cup, with a 3–0 win; this was something of a surprise as the Esksiders had beaten the Greens the previous week in a League match. Armadale proved something of a bugbear to Musselburgh, also beating the club in the first round of the Qualifying Cup, in a match held at Bathgate; Musselburgh's left half Strachan was ordered off with the Dale's Chambers shortly before half-time for fighting. Musselburgh at least had the consolation of reaching the final of the East of Scotland Consolation Cup, but lost 4–2 to Berwick Rangers at Coldstream in a match spoilt by a gusty wind - 'Burgh took a two-goal half-time lead with the wind behind them, but Rangers quickly equalized, and scored a dispiriting third with a Wakenshaw free-kick from almost the half-way line.

The club however was having an impressive debut league season, and was in contention for the championship itself with the final few fixtures remaining, registering 20 points from 16 games, half of them wins. However the League was never finished, with two clubs unable to play more than half the scheduled games and no club playing as many matches as Musselburgh.

Even worse was an issue that ultimately consumed the club. In February 1913, the club's secretary, James Minty, "found it necessary to resign the secretaryship of the club". The reason why became obvious; Minty, who had been an accountant at the Musselburgh & District Tramway Company, had found a similar role in England, but his sudden departure was down to a fraud he had committed on the company, and in April an arrest warrant was issued. His defence was that he borrowed money to repay a shortfall of £50, and, getting into trouble with moneylenders, took £210 from the company with a view of repaying it from his £2 per week wages; he was sentenced to 2 months imprisonment.

The club was unable to recover from the setback. It did not renew its membership of the Eastern League and its final act was its resignation from the Scottish FA in August 1913; its fixtures and fittings were auctioned off in October. The club was replaced by a Junior club - Musselburgh Juniors - at Mall Park.

== Colours ==
The club played in blue.

== Ground ==
The club played at Mall Park, which was by 1912 unoccupied as the Junior sides had moved to Olive Bank. The club had also planned to use King's Park, the former ground of Musselburgh Fern Juniors, should Mall Park not be available.
