= Archibald Pinnell =

Scottish footballer

Personal information
- Full name: Archibald Pinnell
- Date of birth: 1870
- Place of birth: Stevenston, Scotland
- Date of death: 1948 (aged 77–78)
- Place of death: Hamilton, Scotland
- Position: Goalkeeper

Senior career*
Years	Team	Apps	(Gls)
–	Blantyre Victoria		
1891–1893	Everton	3	(0)
1893–1894	Preston North End	1	(0)
1894–1898	Chorley	?	(?)
1898–1899	Burnley	5	(0)
1899–1900	New Brompton	2	(0)
1903–1904	Plymouth Argyle	7	(0)
- * Club domestic league appearances and goals

Archibald Pinnell (1870–1948) was a Scottish professional footballer who played as a goalkeeper.

== Career ==
Born in Ayrshire (although most of his early and later years were spent in Blantyre, South Lanarkshire), he initially played in the Scottish junior leagues with Blantyre Victoria and began his senior career with Everton (making the move south along with forward Allan Maxwell), where he made three appearances in the Football League.

He moved to Preston North End in 1893, where he played as a reserve in a number of outfield positions. Having played in one league match, Pinnell joined Lancashire League side Chorley and established himself as their first choice goalkeeper.

In June 1898, he returned to the Football League with Burnley, where he made six first-team appearances. Pinnell made his debut for Burnley in the 1–1 draw with Notts County on 3 September 1898, and played four more league matches but spent most of the campaign as an understudy to Jack Hillman. During the 1899–1900 season, he played in the Southern League with New Brompton.

Pinnell was playing for an amateur Plymouth side called Oreston Rovers in 1903 when he was signed by newly elected Southern League club Plymouth Argyle as back-up to former England international player Jack Robinson. He made seven appearances for the club before returning to Oreston Rovers in 1904.

== Personal life ==
Pinnell served in the Scots Guards during the latter stages of the Second Boer War. After 9 years as a reservist, he was discharged from the army in 1912 and re-enlisted in June 1915, nearly a year after the outbreak of the First World War. He served as an acting corporal in the Chinese Labour Corps.
