= John Divers (footballer, born 1874) =

Scottish footballer

Personal information
- Birth name: John Diver
- Date of birth: 19 January 1874
- Place of birth: Calton, Scotland
- Date of death: 13 March 1942 (aged 68)
- Place of death: Bridgeton, Scotland
- Position: Forward

Senior career*
Years	Team	Apps	(Gls)
- Vale of Clyde
- Benburb
–1893	Hibernian		
1893–1897	Celtic	29	(15)
1897–1898	Everton	30	(11)
1898–1901	Celtic	34	(22)
1901–1904	Hibernian	25	(10)
Total		118	(58)

International career
1895	Scotland	1	(1)
1895	Scottish League XI	1	(0)
- * Club domestic league appearances and goals

John Divers (19 January 1874 – 13 March 1942) was a Scottish footballer who played as a forward for Hibernian, Celtic, Everton and Scotland.

He won the Scottish Cup on three occasions: with Celtic in 1899 and 1900 (having returned to the club for a second spell after a dispute over critical press reporters which led to his suspension and departure, along with Peter Meechan, in 1897), and with Hibs in 1902.
