= Jack Taylor (footballer, born 1872) =

Scottish footballer

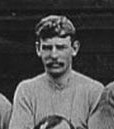
- Taylor in 1906

Personal information
- Full name: John Daniel Taylor
- Date of birth: 27 January 1872
- Place of birth: Dumbarton, Scotland
- Date of death: 21 February 1949 (aged 77)
- Place of death: Liverpool, England

Senior career*
Years	Team	Apps	(Gls)
1889–1894	Dumbarton	58	(35)
1894–1896	St Mirren	27	(12)
1896–1910	Everton	400	(80)
1910–?	South Liverpool		

International career
1892–1895	Scotland	4	(1)
1892–1895	Scottish League XI	6	(4)
- * Club domestic league appearances and goals

John Daniel Taylor (27 January 1872 – 21 February 1949) was a Scottish professional footballer.

== Career ==
Born in Dumbarton in 1872, Taylor started off his career at local club Dumbarton He signed for St Mirren in 1894. In 1896 Taylor was signed by English club Everton where he played in a number of positions. He was the only Everton player to feature in the FA Cup Finals of 1897, 1906 and 1907, finishing on the winning side in 1906.

In the 1910 FA Cup semi-final against Barnsley Taylor was struck by the ball in the throat, damaging his larynx. This effectively ended his professional career and he was transferred to amateurs South Liverpool. Taylor is currently one of only 6 players to make 400 Football League appearances for Everton, making 456 in all competitions, 7th in the club's all-time appearance chart.

== Death ==
Taylor died in Liverpool on February 21, 1949, aged 77.

== Honours ==
Dumbarton

- Scottish League: 1890–91, 1891–92
- Scottish Cup runner-up: 1890–91
- Dumbartonshire Cup: 1890–91, 1891–92, 1892–93
- League Charity Cup: 1890–91

Sporting positions
Preceded by Richard Boyle	Everton captain 1898-1900	Succeeded by Jimmy Settle
Preceded by William Balmer	Everton captain 1905-1908	Succeeded by Jack Sharp
