= Abe Hartley =

Scottish footballer (1872–1909)

Personal information
- Full name: Abraham Hartley
- Date of birth: 8 February 1872
- Place of birth: Dumbarton, Scotland
- Date of death: 9 October 1909 (aged 37)
- Place of death: Southampton, England
- Height: 5 ft 7 in (1.70 m)
- Positions: Right back; centre forward

Youth career
- 1891: Artizan Thistle

Senior career*
Years	Team	Apps	(Gls)
1892	Dumbarton	8	(5)
1892–1897	Everton	50	(24)
1897–1898	Liverpool	7	(1)
1898–1899	Southampton	21	(14)
1899	Woolwich Arsenal	5	(1)
1899–1900	Burnley	13	(5)
Total		104	(50)
- * Club domestic league appearances and goals

Abraham Hartley (8 February 1872 – 9 October 1909) was a Scottish footballer.

Hartley played for Everton as a centre forward for five years in the 1890s. He also played for Merseyside rivals Liverpool and for his local club, Dumbarton. His career also included stints at Southampton, Woolwich Arsenal and Burnley at the end of his career. He appeared on the losing side in the 1897 FA Cup Final while at Everton.

== Football career ==
=== Early days ===
Hartley was born in Dumbarton, Scotland and was the son of a tailor. After youth football with Artizan Thistle, he joined Dumbarton, where two of his brothers also played, in 1890. During his time with Dumbarton, he converted from a right back to a forward. While on the books of Dumbarton, the team won the first two Scottish Football League titles in 1891 and 1892 together with the 1891 Scottish Cup. However Hartley was not a regular with the club at this stage.

=== Everton ===
He moved south of the border to join Everton in December 1892, making his debut on 18 March when, playing at inside right, he scored in a 4–2 victory at Wolverhampton Wanderers. That was his only appearance in the 1892–93 season in which Everton finished third in the table. The following season, he made six league appearances, scoring twice, following this up with five goals from 11 appearances in the 1894–95 season when Everton finished as runners-up behind Sunderland. During this season he remained third–choice striker behind England internationals, Fred Geary and Jack Southworth.

Following Southworth's retirement through injury and Geary's move to Liverpool, Hartley played more regularly although the arrival of Scotland international John Cameron prevented Hartley from claiming the centre-forward's berth as his own. In the 1895–96 season he made 15 appearances, scoring seven goals as Everton finished in third place followed by 14 appearances with six goals in the following season.

In 1897 Everton reached the FA Cup Final with victories en route over Burton Wanderers (5–2), Bury (3–0), Blackburn Rovers (2–0) and Derby County (3–2). Hartley played in all five matches in the cup run, scoring against Blackburn (twice) and Derby. In the final Everton came up against Aston Villa who were dominating the Football League season. Although Everton took the lead after 28 minutes with goals from Jack Bell and Dickie Boyle, they were unable to prevent Villa claiming the Double with a 3–2 victory.

In the following season, he only made three appearances (scoring a hat-trick against Wolverhampton Wanderers on 18 September 1897) before moving across Stanley Park to join Liverpool in December.

In his five years at Everton, Hartley made 61 appearances, scoring 28 goals; his appearances were restricted due to the quality of forwards on Everton's books such as Geary, Southworth and Cameron as well as other internationals Alf Milward, Edgar Chadwick (both England) and Jack Bell (Scotland).

=== Liverpool ===
Hartley stayed at Liverpool for the remainder of the 1897–98 season. During his time with the club he scored the winning goal in a 2–1 away win at Sheffield United on 29 December 1897. Altogether Hartley was capped a sum of 12 times for Liverpool, scoring once.

By now, Hartley was a member of the Association Footballers' Union which was trying to improve player's wages and contract terms. To improve his wages, Hartley decided to join Southampton.

=== Southampton ===
Being members of the Southern League, Southampton were not bound by the restrictions imposed on Football League clubs and were quite willing to pay higher salaries for talented players. Southampton had just moved into their new stadium at The Dell and had signed England internationals Arthur Chadwick, Jack Robinson and Harry Wood as well as Scotland's Jacky Robertson.

Hartley was ever-present until injury forced him to sit out the last three matches of the 1898–99 season as Southampton claimed the Southern League title for the third consecutive year. Hartley's 14 league and two FA Cup goals made him joint top scorer for the season (with Harry Wood).

Hartley would place a hand-rolled cigarette behind his ear prior to kick-off and then smoke it in the changing room at half-time before re-taking the field.

=== Arsenal and Burnley ===
Hartley moved to Woolwich Arsenal in July 1899 where he scored once in five appearances. He made his debut away to Walsall on 23 September 1899 and scored his only goal in a 2–1 win over Gainsborough Trinity on 14 October. However that same month Arsenal signed Ralph Gaudie from Sheffield United, who forced Hartley out of the side. Hartley was sold in December, moving back to Lancashire to join Burnley where he brought an end to his playing days. His five goals from thirteen appearances were unable to prevent Burnley being relegated to the Second Division at the end of that season.

== Later career ==
After retiring from football in 1900, Hartley returned to live in Southampton. He took up employment with the London and South Western Railway but collapsed and died outside the pay office in Southampton Docks on 9 October 1909, aged only 37. A doctor at the inquest attributed his death to "syncope, arising from double pneumonia".

== Honours ==
Dumbarton

- 1 representative cap for Dumbartonshire in 1892.

Everton

- FA Cup runners-up: 1897
- Football League runners-up: 1894–95

Southampton

- Southern League champions: 1898–99
