= James Templeton =

Scottish footballer

Personal information
- Full name: James F. Templeton
- Place of birth: Scotland
- Position: Left half

Senior career*
Years	Team	Apps	(Gls)
1897–1903	Queen's Park	82	(2)

International career
1902–1903	Scottish League XI	2	(0)
- * Club domestic league appearances and goals

James F. Templeton was a Scottish amateur footballer who played as a left half in the Scottish League for Queen's Park. He represented the Scottish League XI.

== Career statistics ==
Appearances and goals by club, season and competition
Club	Season	League			Scottish Cup		Other		Total	
Club	Season	Division	Apps	Goals	Apps	Goals	Apps	Goals	Apps	Goals
Queen's Park	1897–98	Glasgow League	8	0	0	0	2 (Note: 1 appearance and 1 goal in Glasgow Cup, 1 appearance in Glasgow Merchants Charity Cup)	1	10	1
Queen's Park	1898–99	Glasgow League	9	0	3	0	4 (Note: 3 appearances in Glasgow Cup, 1 appearance in Glasgow Merchants Charity Cup)	0	16	0
Queen's Park	1899–1900	Inter City League	10	0	5	0	2 (Note: 1 appearance in Glasgow Cup, 1 appearance in Glasgow Merchants Charity Cup)	0	17	0
Queen's Park	1900–01	Scottish First Division	19	0	2	0	1 (Note: Appearances in Glasgow Cup)	0	22	0
Queen's Park	1901–02	Scottish First Division	14	1	1	0	4 (Note: 2 appearances in Glasgow Cup, 1 appearance in Glasgow Merchants Charity Cup, 1 appearance in Glasgow International Exhibition Cup)	0	19	1
Queen's Park	1902–03	Scottish First Division	15	1	0	0	2	0	17	1
Queen's Park	1903–04	Scottish First Division	7	0	0	0	2	0	9	0
Career total			82	2	11	0	17	1	110	3

== Honours ==
Queen's Park

- Glasgow Cup: 1898–99
