= William Butler (footballer) =

Welsh footballer

Personal information
- Date of birth: 1872
- Place of birth: Wales
- Date of death: 1953 (aged 80–81)
- Position: Forward

International career
Years	Team	Apps	(Gls)
1900	Wales	2	(1)

William Butler (1872 – 1953) was a Welsh international footballer. He was part of the Wales national football team, playing 2 matches and scoring 1 goal. He played his first match on 3 February 1900 against Scotland and his last match on 24 February 1900 against Ireland.

== See also ==
- List of Wales international footballers (alphabetical)
