= Archie Swann =

Scottish footballer

Personal information
- Full name: Archibald McE. Swann
- Place of birth: Scotland
- Position: Full back

Senior career*
Years	Team	Apps	(Gls)
1897–1904	Queen's Park	46	(0)
1904–1905	Partick Thistle	0	(0)
- * Club domestic league appearances and goals

Archibald McE. Swann was a Scottish amateur footballer who played as a full back in the Scottish League for Queen's Park.

== Personal life ==
Swann served as a lieutenant in the Royal Army Medical Corps during the First World War.
