= Sandy McMahon =

Scottish footballer (1870–1916)

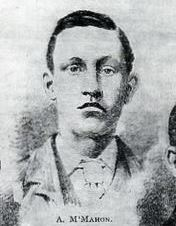
- Portrait of McMahon in 1892

Personal information
- Full name: Alexander McMahon
- Date of birth: 16 October 1870
- Place of birth: Selkirk, Scotland
- Date of death: 25 January 1916 (aged 45)
- Place of death: Glasgow, Scotland
- Position: Forward

Youth career
- Woodburn
- St Augustine's
- Leith Harp

Senior career*
Years	Team	Apps	(Gls)
1885–1886	Hibernian	0	(0)
–	Burnley		
1889–1890	Hibernian	0	(0)
1890–1903	Celtic	177	(131)
1903–1904	Partick Thistle	3	(1)

International career
1892–1902	Scotland	6	(4)
1892–1900	Scottish League XI	9	(4)
- * Club domestic league appearances and goals

Alexander McMahon (16 October 1870 – 25 January 1916) was a Scottish footballer who spent most of his career with Celtic.

== Career ==
Born in Selkirk, McMahon started his career with Woodburn F.C. then Darlington St Augustine's before relocating to Edinburgh. There he played with Leith Harp and Hibernian before a first venture to the professional game in England with Burnley. He returned to Hibs in February 1889 but found the club floundering due to the mass recruitment of their players by newly-formed Glasgow club Celtic.

McMahon eventually followed the path of other former Hibernian favourites, such as Willie Groves, to Celtic in late 1890. He played for the Glasgow team until 1903, making at least 217 appearances and scoring 171 goals. Equally adept at centre forward or inside left, he won three Scottish Cup medals in 1892, 1899 and 1900, and four Scottish League medals in 1893, 1894, 1896 and 1898. His first moment of glory came in the 1892 Scottish Cup Final replay, when he scored two goals in the 5–1 victory over Queen's Park. He also scored in the 1899 cup final when Celtic beat Rangers 2–0, and in the 1900 final when they beat Queen's Park 4–3. In 1892, following his cup final display, McMahon returned to professional football in England with Nottingham Forest but, after concerted efforts from the Celtic committee, returned to Glasgow without having played for the East Midlands side.

The advent of professionalism in Scotland the following year stemmed the southward drift and ensured players such as McMahon could earn sufficient remuneration for their talents by staying in their native country. He was also granted a testimonial match against Rangers in 1899. McMahon played six times for Scotland between 1892 and 1902 and scored three goals in the 11–0 rout of Ireland in 1901. He also represented the Scottish League XI on nine occasions.

McMahon eventually left Celtic in 1903, joining Partick Thistle where he played little due to injury and retired a year later. He earned several sobriquets during his playing days, such as the "prince of dribblers" and "The Duke". The later was derived from the French President Patrice de Mac-Mahon, duc de Magenta (the descendant of an Irish soldier who had served under Napoleon). Writer John Cairney recounts that when the duc de Magenta died, Glasgow news-vendors cried "McMahon died! McMahon died!" to sell more papers, with many Glaswegians purchasing the paper under the assumption that the story referred to the popular Celtic player, rather than the far-removed foreign politician.

In May 2015, a biography, Sandy McMahon And The Early Celts by Celtic historian David Potter, was published.

== See also ==
- List of Scotland national football team hat-tricks
