= Bob Menham =

English footballer

Personal information
- Full name: Robert William Menham
- Date of birth: 7 July 1871
- Place of birth: North Shields, England
- Date of death: January 1945 (aged 70)
- Position: Goalkeeper

Senior career*
Years	Team	Apps	(Gls)
1895–1896	Grenadier Guards		
1896–1897	Everton	18	(0)
1897–1898	Wigan County	22	(0)
1898–1903	Swindon Town	112	(0)
Total		130	(0)
- * Club domestic league appearances and goals

Robert William Menham (7 July 1871 – 1945) was an English footballer who played in the Football League for Everton. Menham played in the 1897 FA Cup Final defeat against Aston Villa.
