= Andrew McGeachen =

Scottish footballer

Personal information
- Date of birth: 1882
- Position: Inside forward

Senior career*
Years	Team	Apps	(Gls)
1901–1904	Cambuslang Hibernian		
1901–1904	Hibernian	35	(6)
1904–1906	Bradford City		
1906–1910	Clyde	13	(5)
1910	Morton	4	(0)
Total		86	(20)
- * Club domestic league appearances and goals

Andrew McGeachen (born 1882) was a Scottish professional footballer who played as an inside forward.

== Career ==
McGeachen began his senior career with Hibernian, playing for the Leith club between 1901 and 1904. He scored the only goal of the 1902 Scottish Cup Final, quickly followed by the Glasgow Merchants Charity Cup (defeating Celtic in both matches) and played in ten matches of the following 1902–03 Scottish Division One campaign as Hibs won the championship for the first time.

He joined Bradford City in November 1904, making 34 league appearances for the club, scoring nine goals; he also scored once in three FA Cup games. He left Bradford in September 1906 to join Clyde.

== Sources ==
- Frost, Terry (1988). Bradford City A Complete Record 1903-1988. Breedon Books Sport. ISBN 0-907969-38-0.
