= David Stewart (footballer, born 1869) =

Scottish footballer (1869–1933)

Personal information
- Full name: David McGregor Stewart
- Date of birth: 13 December 1869
- Place of birth: Gorbals, Scotland
- Date of death: 3 August 1933 (aged 63)
- Place of death: Perth, Scotland
- Positions: Defender; half back

Senior career*
Years	Team	Apps	(Gls)
- Minerva
1891–1900	Queen's Park		
1900–1903	London Caledonians		

International career
1893–1897	Scotland	3	(0)
- * Club domestic league appearances and goals

David Stewart (13 December 1869 – 3 August 1933) was a Scottish footballer who played as a defender or half back.

== Career ==
Born in Glasgow, Stewart played club football for Queen's Park, winning the Scottish Cup in 1893 by beating Celtic and also featuring on the losing side in the 1892 and 1900 finals against the same opposition. (Note: The Queen's Park archive website attributes the appearances in the 1892 and 1893 finals to Allan Stewart (no relation) with most contemporary match reports simply listing the surname. Research for biographical profiles and other match reports confirm these appearances (and all others from 1891 to 1894) were actually made by David and not Allan who had left the club.) He made two appearances for Scotland.

He later moved to London where he played for Caledonians. His younger brother Andy was also a footballer whose clubs included Queen's Park.
