= Hugh Goldie (footballer, born 1874) =

Scottish footballer

Personal information
- Full name: Hugh Goldie
- Date of birth: 10 February 1874
- Place of birth: Dalry, North Ayrshire, Scotland
- Date of death: 1 September 1935 (aged 61)
- Place of death: Kilmarnock, Scotland
- Position: Right half

Senior career*
Years	Team	Apps	(Gls)
1890–1894	Hurlford Thistle		
1894–1895	St Mirren	16	(2)
1895–1897	Everton	18	(1)
1897–1899	Celtic	24	(0)
1899	Dundee	0	(0)
1899	Barry Town		
1899–1900	Millwall Athletic		
1900–1903	Dundee	29	(0)
1902–1903	→ New Brompton (loan)		

International career
1895	Scottish League XI	1	(0)
- * Club domestic league appearances and goals

Hugh Goldie (10 February 1874 – 1 September 1935) was a Scottish footballer active at the turn of the 20th century. He played in England for Everton, making a total of 18 appearances in The Football League. In his native Scotland his clubs included Celtic, St Mirren and Dundee.

== Career ==
Goldie was born in Dalry, Ayrshire, where his father was a miner. He later moved to the Riccarton area of Kilmarnock where he played football for Hurlford Thistle, when he was not working as a bonded storeman. In 1895 he was playing for St Mirren and had been selected for the Scottish League XI when he was spotted by Everton, spending two seasons on Merseyside. He subsequently transferred to Celtic where he spent 18 months, winning the Scottish Football League title in 1897–98 but falling out of favour in the next campaign after two heavy losses to Rangers (1–4 and 0–4) confirmed they would be unable to repeat the achievement.

He then had spells at Dundee, Barry Town, Millwall and New Brompton.

During his married life he had four sons and four daughters. His sons Hugh and John both became professional footballers. He died in September 1935 in Kilmarnock. Although from the same district, his family is not closely related to the Goldie brothers (Archie and Bill) who played for Liverpool in the same era.
