= Alex Christie (footballer, born 1873) =

Scottish footballer

Personal information
- Full name: Alexander Jack Christie
- Date of birth: 28 September 1873
- Place of birth: Dunblane, Scotland
- Date of death: 26 March 1954 (aged 80)
- Place of death: Glasgow, Scotland
- Position: Centre half

Senior career*
| Years | Team | Apps | (Gls) |
| 1894–1897 | St Bernard's | 7 | (1) |
| 1897 | Dunblane | | |
| 1897–1901 | Queen's Park | 2 | (0) |
| 1901–1902 | St Bernard's | 4 | (1) |
| 1902–1903 | Queen's Park | 15 | (4) |

International career
| 1898–1899 | Scotland | 3 | (1) |
- * Club domestic league appearances and goals

Alexander Jack Christie (28 September 1873 – 26 March 1954) was a Scottish footballer who played as a centre half in the Scottish League for Queen's Park and St Bernard's. He was capped by Scotland at international level.

== Personal life ==
Christie was the younger brother of international footballer Robert Christie. Christie studied law in Edinburgh and became a lawyer in Glasgow. He was the sole partner in the legal firm Sellar and Christie and as of his death had been secretary of the Scottish Building Contractors' Association for approximately fifty years.
