= James McMillan (footballer, born 1869) =

Scottish footballer

Personal information
- Full name: James Andrew McMillan
- Date of birth: 11 April 1869
- Place of birth: Bonhill, Scotland
- Date of death: 20 February 1937 (aged 67)
- Place of death: Bootle, England
- Position: Inside forward

Senior career*
| Years | Team | Apps | (Gls) |
| 1888–1890 | Vale of Leven | 3 | (0) |
| 1890–1896 | Everton | 7 | (5) |
| 1896–1898 | St Bernard's | 25 | (4) |
| Total | | 33 | (9) |

International career
| 1897 | Scotland | 1 | (0) |
- * Club domestic league appearances and goals

James Andrew McMillan (11 April 1869 – 20 February 1937) was a Scottish footballer who played in the Football League for Everton. He had earlier played for Vale of Leven, featuring on the losing side in the 1890 Scottish Cup Final, and later returned to Scottish football with St Bernard's, his club at the time of making one appearance for the Scotland national team in 1897 against Wales after impressing in a trial. He later returned to live on Merseyside with his family.
