= John Whitehead (footballer) =

English footballer

Personal information
- Place of birth: England
- Position: Goalkeeper

Senior career*
Years	Team	Apps	(Gls)
1892	Bootle	7	(0)
1893	Everton	2	(0)
1894–1895	Liverpool	2	(0)
- * Club domestic league appearances and goals

John Whitehead was a footballer who played in the Football League for Bootle, Everton and Liverpool.
