= Harry Rennie =

Scottish footballer (1873–1954)

Personal information
- Full name: Henry George Rennie
- Date of birth: 1 June 1873
- Place of birth: Greenock, Scotland
- Date of death: 17 March 1954 (aged 80)
- Place of death: Greenock, Scotland
- Position: Goalkeeper

Senior career*
Years	Team	Apps	(Gls)
- Volunteers
- Bellgrove Ramblers
- Greenock West End
1895–1898	Morton	39	(0)
1898–1900	Heart of Midlothian	36	(0)
1900–1908	Hibernian	196	(0)
1908–1910	Rangers	33	(0)
1910	→ Morton (loan)	1	(0)
1910–1911	Kilmarnock	32	(0)
1911–1912	Morton	1	(0)
Total		338	(0)

International career
1900–1908	Scotland	13	(0)
1900–1908	Scottish League XI	7	(0)
- * Club domestic league appearances and goals

Henry George Rennie (1 June 1873 – 17 March 1954) was a Scottish football goalkeeper who played for Morton, Heart of Midlothian, Hibernian, Rangers, Kilmarnock and the Scotland national team.

== Career ==
Born in Greenock, Rennie started his career as a half-back with local Junior sides Volunteers, Bellgrove Ramblers and Greenock Junior West End. His early talent earned him selection for the Scottish Junior International side and eventually a move to Scottish Football League Division Two Morton, where he belatedly became a goalkeeper in 1897, at the age of 23.

Rennie introduced several innovative concepts to goalkeeping in Scottish football. He was the first to demark his goal area to assist him with judging angles, while he also pioneered the study of opposing forwards' gestures and body-language as they prepared to shoot. His scientific approach quickly brought him to national prominence and he signed for First Division Hearts in 1898 for £50. During two seasons at Tynecastle, he helped the Edinburgh side to second and fourth place League finishes and also made his international debut for Scotland.

In 1900, Hearts agreed Rennie's transfer to Celtic, however a problem with his contract ensured he never officially joined the Glasgow club. Instead, he signed for Hearts' city rivals Hibernian, where he became an important figure in one of the most successful eras in the club's history. He helped them to claim the 1901–02 Scottish Cup, defeating Celtic 1–0 in the final, with contemporary match reports crediting him with several notable saves. Hibs triumphed despite the final being played at Celtic Park, the home ground of their opponents, as a result of Ibrox's unavailability following the partial terracing collapse which occurred during the annual Scotland v England match two weeks earlier. The following year, Rennie helped Hibs to their first ever League title. Rennie and captain Bobby Atherton were the only two players to appear in every match during that campaign.

Hibs couldn't retain this level of success in the following years but Rennie remained a frequent choice as Scotland goalkeeper. He won 13 caps in total between 1900 and 1908, recording 4 clean sheets in the process. He also made seven appearances for the SFL representative side. He joined Rangers in 1908 and appeared for them in the infamous 1909 Scottish Cup Final, which was abandoned after crowd trouble involving rival Celtic and Rangers fans. Aside from brief emergency appearances for Morton, his last move was to Kilmarnock in 1910, where he retired short of his fortieth birthday.

Rennie's innovative approach to goalkeeping had earned him many admirers and after his playing retirement he maintained an interest in the game by mentoring prospective young goalkeepers. His most famous disciple was 1940s Morton and Scotland goalkeeper Jimmy Cowan.
