= Richard Williams (English footballer) =

English footballer (1866–1939)

Personal information
- Date of birth: 17 April 1866
- Place of birth: Bromborough Pool, England
- Date of death: 5 November 1939 (aged 73)
- Place of death: Leigh, Lancashire, England
- Height: 6 ft 0 in (1.83 m)
- Position: Goalkeeper

Senior career*
Years	Team	Apps	(Gls)
- Bromborough Pool
1891–1895	Everton	58	(0)
1895–1899	Luton Town		
1899–1900	Glossop North End/Glossop		
Total		58+	(0+)
- * Club domestic league appearances and goals

Richard Williams (17 April 1866 – 5 November 1939) was an English professional footballer who played as a goalkeeper.

== Career ==
Born in Bromborough Pool, Williams played for Bromborough Pool, Everton, Luton Town and Glossop North End/Glossop. At Everton he was a member of the first team between 1891 and 1895, making a total of 70 appearances - 58 in the Football League and 12 in the FA Cup. Williams played in the 1893 FA Cup Final for Everton, and moved to Luton Town in February 1895.

== Personal life ==
Williams worked at the Bromborough Pool soap factory (prior to turning professional at football) and was married twice.
