= James Irons =

Scottish footballer

Personal information
- Full name: James Hay Irons
- Date of birth: 30 October 1874
- Place of birth: Scoonie, Fife, Scotland
- Date of death: 1957 (aged 82–83)
- Place of death: Pollok, Scotland
- Position: Wing half

Youth career
- Pollokshields Athletic

Senior career*
Years	Team	Apps	(Gls)
1896–1901	Queen's Park	6	(0)
1896	→ Morton (loan)	3	(0)
- Abercorn

International career
1900	Scotland	1	(0)
- * Club domestic league appearances and goals

James Hay Irons (30 October 1874 – 1957) was a Scottish footballer who played as a wing half.

== Career ==
Born in Scoonie and raised in Cathcart, Irons played club football mainly for Queen's Park, winning the Glasgow Cup in 1898 and featuring on the losing side in the 1900 Scottish Cup Final. He also played briefly for Morton and Abercorn before retiring from the professional game in his mid-20s.

He made one international appearance for Scotland in 1900 against Wales and had also been selected for the Glasgow FA'a annual challenge match against Sheffield a year earlier.
