= James Adams (footballer, born 1864) =

Scottish footballer

Jimmy Adams
Personal information
- Full name: James Adams
- Date of birth: 17 August 1864
- Place of birth: Edinburgh, Scotland
- Date of death: 21 April 1943 (aged 78)
- Place of death: Kearny, New Jersey, United States
- Position: Defender

Youth career
- 1884–1885: Norton Park

Senior career*
| Years | Team | Apps | (Gls) |
| 1885–1894 | Heart of Midlothian | 75 | (0) |
| 1894–1896 | Everton | 40 | (1) |
| 1896–1897 | Heart of Midlothian | 4 | (1) |
| 1897–1898 | St Bernard's | 3 | (0) |
| Total | | 122 | (2) |

International career
| 1889–1893 | Scotland | 3 | (0) |
| 1893–1894 | Scottish League XI | 2 | (0) |
- * Club domestic league appearances and goals

James Adams (17 August 1864 – 21 April 1943) was a Scottish footballer who played for Heart of Midlothian, Everton and Scotland.

He started his senior career with Hearts, and won the Scottish Cup with the club in 1891 (their first major trophy and the first time the competition had been won by a team from the Scottish capital). He played in England for Everton for two seasons from 1894 to 1896, before playing one more season for Hearts in 1896–97 and finishing with a short spell at St Bernard's. Adams won three caps for Scotland, spread across four years. In an era when representative matches between cities and regions were frequent, he was selected for Edinburgh / East of Scotland on 17 occasions.

Adams once deliberately handled the ball to prevent a goal from being scored (against East Stirlingshire during Hearts' 1891 cup run), and the outcry resulting from this incident led to the introduction of the penalty kick. After retiring as a player, Adams became a football referee. He later emigrated to the United States where he worked as a mason, and died in New Jersey in 1943.
