= William Stewart (footballer, born 1868) =

Scottish footballer

Bill Stewart
Personal information
- Full name: William Steven Stewart
- Date of birth: 1868
- Place of birth: Arbroath, Scotland
- Date of death: 11 January 1937
- Place of death: Smithdown Road Hospital, Liverpool, England
- Position: Wing half

Senior career*
Years	Team	Apps	(Gls)
1889–1890	Distillery		
1890–1893	Preston North End	69	(4)
1893–1897	Everton	122	(6)
1898–1900	Bristol City	51	(0)
- * Club domestic league appearances and goals

William Stewart (born 1868) was a Scottish footballer who played in the Football League for Everton and Preston North End.

== Football career ==
Initially with Black Watch, Stewart was an Army Cup winner and helped Distillery win the Irish Cup while stationed in Ireland with the Royal Scots. Preston North End bought him out of the Army. He moved to Everton in July 1893, forming a notable half back line with Johnny Holt and Dickie Boyle and playing in the 1897 FA Cup Final, a defeat to Aston Villa. Stewart was signed for Bristol City by Sam Hollis in July 1898 and finished his career as captain playing 51 games in the Southern League with Bristol City. He was noted for his long throw-ins involving a running and jumping technique that was eventually outlawed.

== Professional baseball ==
In 1890 Stewart played right field professionally for Preston North End Baseball Club in the National League of Baseball of Great Britain.

== Later life, tragedy and hardship ==
Bill Stewart later settled in the Toxteth area of Liverpool. After his playing days ended he worked for a time on the Liverpool docks, only to suffer severe injuries in an accident at some point in the 1920s. Unable to earn a living Stewart fell on hard times and well-known Liverpool Echo football reporter 'Bee' suggested Everton F.C. should take a collection for their former captain at a match in October 1927. This suggestion was discussed at an Everton F.C. board meeting on 25 October 1927, but no agreement is detailed. Everton F.C. did later donate funds to Stewart and his family, as agreed at a board meeting in September 1936, after news had reached the club that their former player was seriously ill with cancer. Two payments of five pounds are detailed at subsequent meetings.

Stewart's son Robert, born to first wife, Mary Emma Bennett, was killed in action on 12 December 1917. Mary had died in 1900, aged just 29. Stewart remarried Ellen in 1910 and they had a son, Donald, who died aged just seven in 1915.

Bill Stewart died on 11 January 1937, at Smithdown Road Hospital. He was buried in an unmarked grave at the nearby Toxteth Park Cemetery. The Everton board of directors sent a wreath and letter to his family. Ellen died aged 69 in February 1937, barely a month after her husband, and was buried with him and their son at Toxteth Park Cemetery.

Sporting positions
Preceded by Richard Boyle	Everton captain 1896-1897	Succeeded by Richard Boyle
