= Tom McInnes (footballer, born 1869) =

Scottish footballer

Personal information
- Date of birth: 22 March 1869
- Place of birth: Glasgow, Scotland
- Date of death: 17 January 1939 (aged 69)
- Place of death: Luton, England
- Position: Forward

Senior career*
Years	Team	Apps	(Gls)
- Dalmuir Thistle
- Cowlairs
1889–1893	Notts County	73	(20)
1892	Rangers	4	
1893–1894	Third Lanark	18	(8)
1894–1896	Everton	42	(18)
1897–1900	Luton Town	93	(21)
- Bedford Queens Engineers

International career
1889	Scotland	1	(1)
1891–1892	Football League XI	2	(1)
- * Club domestic league appearances and goals

Thomas McInnes (22 March 1869 – 17 January 1939) was a Scottish professional footballer. McInnes was capped once for Scotland, against Ireland in 1889.

== Football career ==
McInnes was born in Glasgow. He joined local club Cowlairs, playing as a forward, most often at outside right. His performances for Cowlairs earned him a cap for the Scotland national team, on 9 March 1889 against Ireland in the 1889 British Home Championship. Scotland won the match 7–0, and McInnes scored the last goal, in the 88th minute.

McInnes scored 67 goals from 226 appearances playing as an inside forward for Notts County between 1889 and 1893. McInnes played on the losing side for Notts County against Blackburn Rovers in the 1891 FA Cup final. During 1892, he briefly returned to Scotland to play for Rangers. Upon his return to Notts County, McInnes was suspended for a month by the Football Association because his move to Rangers breached their rules.

McInnes later played for Everton and Luton Town in the Football League and for Third Lanark in the Scottish Football League. On 13 October 1894, McInnes scored the opening goal in the first ever Merseyside derby, which Everton won 3–0.
