= Smart Arridge =

Footballer

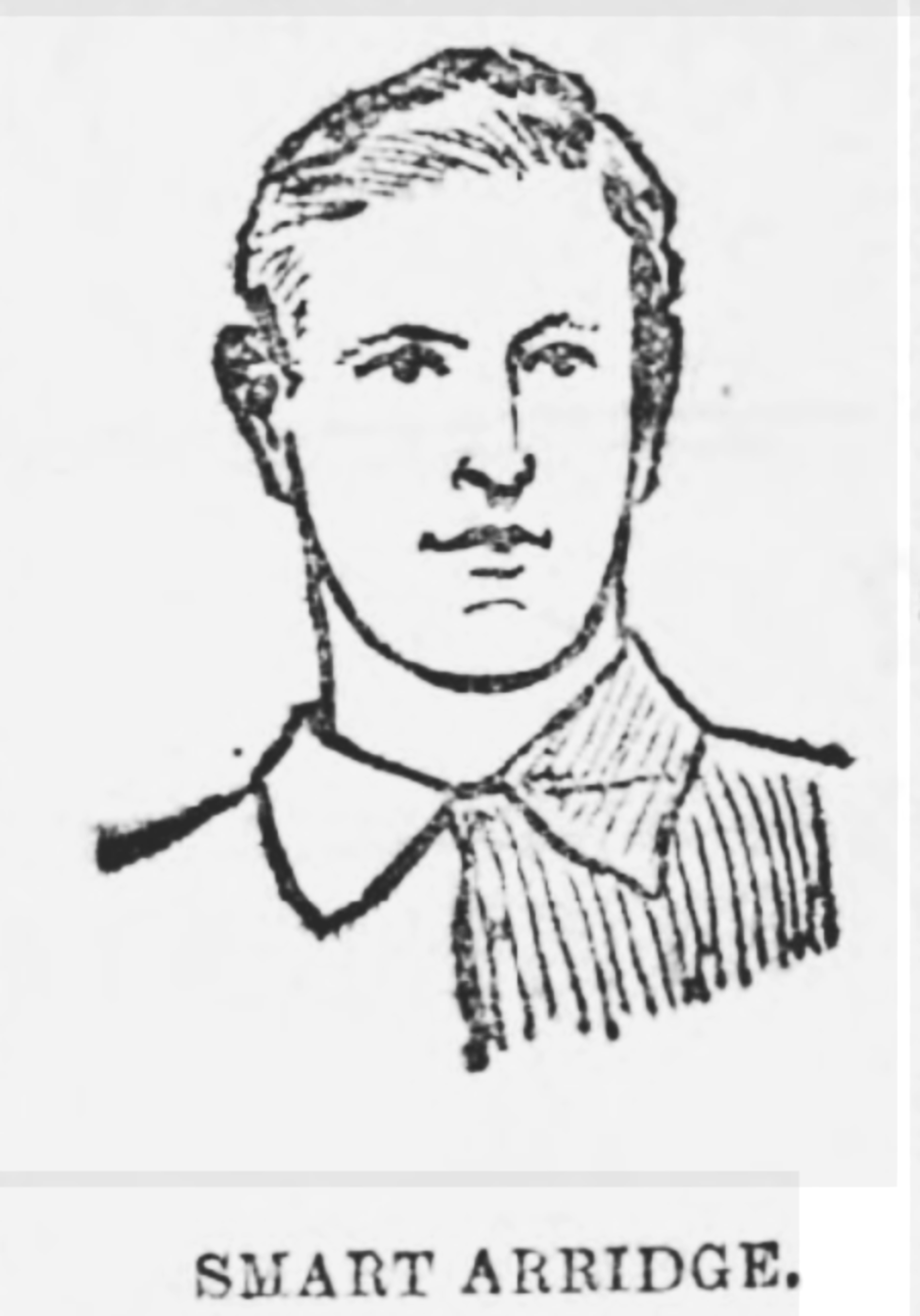
- Portrait of Smart-Arridge.

Personal information
- Full name: Smart Atkinson Arridge
- Date of birth: 21 June 1872
- Place of birth: Southwick, England
- Date of death: 19 October 1947 (aged 75)
- Place of death: Bangor, Wales
- Position: Left back

Senior career*
Years	Team	Apps	(Gls)
1888-1892	Bangor City	?	(?)
1892-1893	Bootle	21	(0)
1893–1896	Everton	51	(0)
1898–1900	New Brighton Tower	83	(2)
1901–1902	Stockport County	63	(0)
?-?	Bangor City	?	(?)

International career
1893–1896	Wales	8	(0)
- * Club domestic league appearances and goals

Smart Arridge (21 June 1872 – 19 October 1947) was a footballer who played in the Football League for Bootle, Everton, New Brighton Tower and Stockport County. He also played for Wales.
