= David Wilson (Queen's Park footballer) =

Scottish footballer

Personal information
- Full name: David J Wilson
- Date of birth: 21 February 1880
- Place of birth: Scotland
- Date of death: 20 June 1926 (aged 46)
- Position: Inside forward

Senior career*
Years	Team	Apps	(Gls)
1897–1908	Queen's Park	78	(24)

International career
1900	Scotland	1	(2)
1902–1903	Scottish League XI	2	(0)
- * Club domestic league appearances and goals

David J. Wilson (21 February 1880 – 20 June 1926) was a Scottish amateur footballer who played in the Scottish League for Queen's Park as an inside right. While playing for Queen's Park, he scored the first ever goal at the third (current) Hampden Park, in 1903. He scored two goals on his sole appearance for Scotland in 1900.

== Personal life ==
Wilson served as a second lieutenant in the Argyll and Sutherland Highlanders during the First World War. A Glasgow solicitor, he died in 1926.
