= William Stewart (footballer, born 1875) =

Scottish footballer

Willie Stewart
Personal information
- Full name: William Garven Stewart
- Date of birth: 7 January 1875
- Place of birth: Crosshill, Scotland
- Date of death: 30 April 1951 (aged 76)
- Place of death: Bootle, England
- Position: Outside right

Senior career*
Years	Team	Apps	(Gls)
1894–1901	Queen's Park	7	(1)
1896	→ St Bernard's (loan)	0	(0)
1901	Third Lanark	0	(0)
1901–1903	Newcastle United	37	(5)

International career
1898–1900	Scotland	2	(1)
- * Club domestic league appearances and goals

William Garven Stewart (7 January 1875 – 30 April 1951) was a Scottish footballer who played as an outside right.

== Career ==
Born in Glasgow, Stewart played club football for Queen's Park (most of his time there being in the period before the club joined the Scottish Football League), Third Lanark (appearing in the Scottish Cup only) and Newcastle United, and made two appearances for Scotland. He scored five goals in 41 appearances in all competitions for Newcastle, where he had moved as a result of his profession outside the game as a maritime engineer. He later settled on Merseyside.
