= Harry Marshall (Scottish footballer) =

Scottish footballer

Personal information
- Full name: Henry James Hall Marshall
- Date of birth: 24 November 1872
- Place of birth: Portobello, Scotland
- Date of death: 16 September 1936 (aged 63)
- Place of death: Leith, Scotland
- Position: Centre half

Youth career
- Portobello Thistle

Senior career*
Years	Team	Apps	(Gls)
1891–1892	St Bernard's		
1892	Heart of Midlothian	7	(1)
1892–1896	Blackburn Rovers		
1896–1899	Heart of Midlothian	37	(1)
1898	→ Blackburn Rovers (loan)		
1899	→ Celtic (loan)	0	(0)
1899–1903	Celtic	30	(5)
1900	→ Alloa Athletic (loan)		
1900–1901	→ Raith Rovers (loan)		
1903–1904	Clyde	6	(0)
1906–1907	Broxburn Athletic		

International career
1898–1900	Scottish League XI	4	(0)
1899–1900	Scotland	2	(1)
- * Club domestic league appearances and goals

Henry James Hall Marshall (24 November 1872 – 16 September 1936) was a Scottish footballer, who played for St Bernard's, Heart of Midlothian, Blackburn Rovers, Celtic, Clyde and Scotland. In 1912 he became trainer to the Eastern League side Musselburgh.

== See also ==
- List of Scotland national football team captains
