= David Storrier =

Scottish footballer

Personal information
- Date of birth: 25 October 1872
- Place of birth: Arbroath, Scotland
- Date of death: 27 January 1910 (aged 37)
- Place of death: Arbroath, Scotland
- Position: Left back

Youth career
- Arbroath Dauntless

Senior career*
Years	Team	Apps	(Gls)
1892–1893	Arbroath		
1893–1898	Everton	55	(0)
1898–1901	Celtic	34	(0)
1901–1905	Dundee	7	(0)
1902–1903	→ Millwall Athletic (loan)		

International career
1899	Scotland	3	(0)
1899–1901	Scottish League XI	2	(0)
- * Club domestic league appearances and goals

David Storrier (25 October 1872 – 27 January 1910) was a Scottish footballer who played for Arbroath, Everton, Celtic, Dundee, Millwall Athletic and Scotland. Storrier cost a Scottish record transfer fee of £320 in 1898 when Celtic signed him from Everton (where he played on the losing side in the 1897 FA Cup Final), and he went on to win the Scottish Cup in 1899 and 1900 with the Glasgow club. He was a keen cricketer, playing at Scottish county level for Forfarshire. He suffered a serious injury in 1902 when struck on the head by a ball.

== See also ==
- List of Scotland national football team captains
