= Dickie Boyle =

Scottish footballer (1869–?)

Personal information
- Full name: Richard Hill Boyle
- Date of birth: 24 September 1869
- Place of birth: Dumbarton, Scotland
- Date of death: 24 May 1947 (aged 77)

Senior career*
Years	Team	Apps	(Gls)
1888–1892	Dumbarton	40	(2)
1892–1901	Everton	231	(7)
1901–1902	New Brighton Tower		
1902–1906	Dundee	72	(3)

International career
1892	Scottish League XI	1	(0)
- * Club domestic league appearances and goals

Richard Boyle (24 September 1869 – 24 May 1947) was a Scottish professional footballer.

== Career ==
Boyle played club football in Scotland and England for Dumbarton, Everton, New Brighton Tower and Dundee.

== Honours ==
Dumbarton

- Scottish League: 1890–91, 1891–92
- Scottish Cup runner-up: 1890–91
- Dumbartonshire Cup: 1889–90, 1890–91, 1891–92
- League Charity Cup: 1890–91
- 1 cap for the Scottish League in 1892
- 1 international trial for Scotland in 1892
- 2 representative caps for Dumbartonshire during the 1889–90 season
