= Jack Bell (footballer, born 1868) =

Scottish footballer and manager

Personal information
- Full name: John Watson Bell
- Date of birth: 6 October 1868
- Place of birth: Dumbarton, Scotland
- Date of death: 12 April 1956 (aged 87)
- Place of death: Wallasey, England
- Positions: Outside left; inside forward

Youth career
- Dumbarton Union

Senior career*
Years	Team	Apps	(Gls)
1888–1893	Dumbarton	50	(45)
1892–1898	Everton	130	(41)
1898	Tottenham Hotspur	?	(?)
1898–1900	Celtic	35	(19)
1900–1901	New Brighton Tower	22	(9)
1901–1902	Everton	46	(19)
1903–1908	Preston North End	108	(29)
Total		391+	(162+)

International career
1890–1900	Scotland	10	(5)
1892–1899	Scottish League XI	2	(1)
- * Club domestic league appearances and goals

John Watson Bell (6 October 1868 – 12 April 1956) was a Scottish football player and manager.

== Career ==
A winger or inside-forward born in Dumbarton, Bell played with Dumbarton Union, Dumbarton, Everton, Tottenham Hotspur, Celtic, New Brighton Tower and Preston North End. During his time with Everton, he was one of a group of five men who were the first to be selected for Scotland while playing for an English club (although Bell had been capped already at Dumbarton), in the process becoming the club's first international for that nation. As well as playing for one season alongside his younger brother Laurie, previously also a Dumbarton teammate, he also helped organise the Association Footballers' Union and later served as its president; his activities in this area caused Everton to end his contract, and he switched to non-league Tottenham for a short period before returning to Scotland with Celtic, though he later returned to Goodison Park.

In 1909, Bell was appointed manager/coach of former club Preston. He later spent some time in Canada, but settled in the Merseyside area. His great-grandson Tom Smith was a Scottish international in rugby union.

=== International goals ===
Scores and results list Scotland's goal tally first.

#	Date	Venue	Opponent	Score	Result	Competition
1	2 April 1892	Ibrox Stadium, Glasgow	England	1–4	1–4	1892 British Home Championship
2	4 April 1896	Celtic Park, Glasgow	England	2–0	2–1	1896 British Home Championship
3	25 March 1899	Celtic Park, Glasgow	Ireland	5–0	9–1	1899 British Home Championship
4	3 February 1900	Pittodrie Stadium, Aberdeen	Wales	1–0	5–2	1900 British Home Championship
5	7 April 1900	Celtic Park, Glasgow	England	2–0	4–1	1900 British Home Championship

== Honours ==
Dumbarton

- Scottish League: Champions 1890–91, 1891–92
- Scottish Cup: Runner-up 1890–91
- Dumbartonshire Cup: Winners 1888–89, 1889–90, 1890–91, 1891–92, 1892–93
- League Charity Cup: Winners 1890–91
- Greenock Charity Cup: Winners 1889–90 - Runner-up 1888–89
- 2 caps for Scotland between 1889 and 1892, scoring one goal
- 1 cap for the Scottish League in 1892, scoring one goal
- 1 representative cap for Scotland against Canada XI in 1891, scoring two goals
- 7 representative caps for Dumbartonshire between 1888 and 1890, scoring three goals
- 2 international trial games for Scotland between 1890 and 1892
- top Scottish League goalscorer: 1890–91 (20 goals); 1891–92 (19 goals).
