= List of Rangers F.C. seasons =

Seasons of the Scottish football club

Rangers Football Club was founded in 1872 and is one of the 11 original members of the Scottish Football League in 1890. The club's home ground, Ibrox Stadium, is in the south-west of Glasgow, Scotland.

Rangers were the first British club to reach a UEFA tournament final and won the European Cup Winners' Cup in 1972 after being runner-up twice in 1961 and 1967. A third runners-up finish in Europe came in the UEFA Cup in 2008. A fourth runners-up finish in Europe came in the Europa League in 2022.

The table details the club's achievements in all national and European first team competitions and the top scorers for each season.

== Overview ==
Although Rangers had been playing in the Scottish Cup since season 1874–75, being runners-up twice, they did not compete in an official league until 1890–91. In their very first season the club played eighteen championship matches, also a play-off which they drew and so shared the first ever league title with Dumbarton.

The Scottish League Cup did not begin until season 1946–47, Rangers won the inaugural competition by defeating Aberdeen 4–0 in the final. The 1956–57 season saw the club enter the European arena.

Key

- Pld = Played
- W = Games won
- D = Games drawn
- L = Games lost
- GF = Goals for
- GA = Goals against
- Pts = Points
- Pos = Final position
- R1 = Round 1
- R2 = Round 2
- R3 = Round 3
- R4 = Round 4
- R5 = Round 5
- R6 = Round 6
- QF = Quarter-finals
- SF = Semi-finals
- n/a = not applicable

Colour coding

Champions	Runners-up	Promoted	Demoted

== Seasons ==
=== Prior to league formation (1872–1890) ===
Season	League									Scottish Cup	FA Cup	Top goalscorer		Notes
Season	Division	Pld	W	D	L	GF	GA	Pts	Pos	Scottish Cup	FA Cup	Name	Goals	Notes
1874–75	n/a									R2	n/a	Moses McNeil; David Gibb	1	
1875–76	n/a									R2	n/a	John Campbell	3	
1876–77	n/a									RU	n/a	Peter Campbell	5	
1877–78	n/a									R4	n/a	Peter Campbell	7	
1878–79	n/a									RU	n/a	William Struthers	6	
1879–80	n/a									R1	n/a	Archibald Steel; William Struthers	2	
1880–81	n/a									QF	n/a	George Angus	5	
1881–82	n/a									QF	n/a	David Hill	5	
1882–83	n/a									R2	n/a	W Corbett; William Pringle; James Watson	2	
1883–84	n/a									SF	n/a	James Gossland	5	
1884–85	n/a									QF	n/a	James Gossland; Alick McKenzie; Peter Morton	3	
1885–86	n/a									R1	R1	No goals scored	0	
1886–87	n/a									R3	SF	Matthew Lawrie	5	
1887–88	n/a									R2	n/a	John Gow	5	
1888–89	n/a									R2	n/a	Thomas Wylie	8	
1889–90	n/a									R3	n/a	Donald Gow; Thomas Wylie	5	

=== League football era, Pre-war (1890–1939) ===
Season	League									Scottish Cup	Top goalscorer		Notes
Season	Division	Pld	W	D	L	GF	GA	Pts	Pos	Scottish Cup	Name	Goals	Notes
1890–91	Scottish League	18	13	3	2	58	25	29	1st	R1	John McPherson	15	
1891–92	Scottish League	22	11	2	9	59	46	24	5th	SF	John McPherson	12	
1892–93	Scottish League	18	12	4	2	41	27	28	2nd	QF	Hugh McCreadie	13	
1893–94	Division One	18	8	4	6	44	30	20	4th	W	James Steel	12	
1894–95	Division One	18	10	2	6	41	26	22	3rd	R1	John McPherson; John Barker	9	
1895–96	Division One	18	11	4	3	57	39	26	2nd	QF	Alex Smith	16	
1896–97	Division One	18	11	3	4	64	30	25	3rd	W	Tommy Hyslop; John McPherson	15	
1897–98	Division One	18	13	3	2	71	15	29	2nd	W	Robert Hamilton	26	
1898–99	Division One	18	18	0	0	79	18	36	1st	RU	Robert Hamilton	25	
1899–1900	Division One	18	15	2	1	69	27	32	1st	SF	Robert Hamilton	23	
1900–01	Division One	20	17	1	2	60	25	35	1st	R1	Robert Hamilton	20	
1901–02	Division One	18	13	2	3	43	29	28	1st	SF	Robert Hamilton	11	
1902–03	Division One	22	12	5	5	56	30	29	3rd	W	Robert Hamilton	18	
1903–04	Division One	26	16	6	4	80	33	38	3rd	RU	Robert Hamilton	31	
1904–05	Division One	26	19	3	4	83	28	41	2nd	RU	Robert Hamilton	19	
1905–06	Division One	30	15	7	8	58	48	37	4th	QF	Robert Hamilton	10	
1906–07	Division One	34	19	7	8	69	33	45	3rd	QF	Jimmy Speirs	14	
1907–08	Division One	34	21	8	5	74	40	50	3rd	R2	Robert Campbell	25	
1908–09	Division One	34	19	7	8	91	38	45	4th	F	Robert Campbell	17	
1909–10	Division One	34	20	6	8	70	35	46	3rd	R2	Willie Hunter	19	
1910–11	Division One	34	23	6	5	90	34	52	1st	QF	Willie Reid	41	
1911–12	Division One	34	24	3	7	86	34	51	1st	R2	Willie Reid	34	
1912–13	Division One	34	24	5	5	76	41	53	1st	R3	Willie Reid	23	
1913–14	Division One	38	27	5	6	79	31	59	2nd	R3	Willie Reid	25	
1914–15	Division One	38	23	4	11	74	47	50	3rd	n/a	Willie Reid	28	
1915–16	Division One	38	25	6	7	87	39	56	2nd	n/a	Willie Reid	21	
1916–17	Division One	38	24	5	9	68	32	53	3rd	n/a	Charlie Duncan	15	
1917–18	Division One	34	25	6	3	66	24	56	1st	n/a	Tommy Cairns; Jimmy Gordon	11	
1918–19	Division One	34	26	5	3	86	16	57	2nd	n/a	David McLean	29	
1919–20	Division One	42	31	9	2	106	25	71	1st	SF	Andy Cunningham	25	
1920–21	Division One	42	35	6	1	91	24	76	1st	RU	Andy Cunningham	27	
1921–22	Division One	42	28	10	4	83	26	66	2nd	RU	Geordie Henderson	27	
1922–23	Division One	38	23	9	6	67	29	55	1st	R2	Geordie Henderson	24	
1923–24	Division One	38	25	9	4	72	29	59	1st	R3	Geordie Henderson	23	
1924–25	Division One	38	25	10	3	76	26	60	1st	SF	Geordie Henderson	32	
1925–26	Division One	38	19	6	13	79	55	44	6th	SF	Andy Cunningham; Jimmy Fleming	20	
1926–27	Division One	38	23	10	5	85	41	56	1st	QF	Jimmy Fleming	21	
1927–28	Division One	38	26	8	4	109	36	60	1st	W	Jimmy Fleming	37	
1928–29	Division One	38	30	7	1	107	32	67	1st	RU	Jimmy Fleming	40	
1929–30	Division One	38	28	4	6	94	32	60	1st	W	Jimmy Fleming	33	
1930–31	Division One	38	27	6	5	96	29	60	1st	R2	Bob McPhail	22	
1931–32	Division One	38	28	5	5	118	42	61	2nd	W	Sam English	53	
1932–33	Division One	38	26	10	2	113	43	62	1st	R3	Jimmy Smith	35	
1933–34	Division One	38	30	6	2	118	41	66	1st	W	Jimmy Smith	46	
1934–35	Division One	38	25	5	8	96	46	55	1st	W	Jimmy Smith	44	
1935–36	Division One	38	27	7	4	110	43	61	2nd	W	Jimmy Smith	37	
1936–37	Division One	38	26	9	3	88	32	61	1st	R1	Jimmy Smith	31	
1937–38	Division One	38	18	13	7	75	49	49	3rd	SF	Jimmy Smith	25	
1938–39	Division One	38	25	9	4	112	55	59	1st	R3	Alex Venters	37	
1939–40	Division One	5	4	1	0	14	3	9			Willie Thornton	5	

=== Football during and after the Second World War (1940–1955) ===
Season	League									Scottish Cup	League Cup	Top goalscorer		Notes
Season	Division	Pld	W	D	L	GF	GA	Pts	Pos	Scottish Cup	League Cup	Name	Goals	Notes
No competitive football was played between 1939 and 1946 due to the Second World War. Rangers entered unofficial competitions including the 1939–40 Emergency League, the 1940 Emergency Cup, the Southern League, the Summer Cup, the Southern League Cup and the 1946 Victory Cup, winning most of them.
1946–47	Division A	30	21	4	5	76	26	46	1st	R2	W	Willie Thornton; Jimmy Duncanson	25	
1947–48	Division A	30	21	4	5	64	28	46	2nd	W	SF	Willie Thornton	22	
1948–49	Division A	30	20	6	4	63	32	46	1st	W	W	Willie Thornton	34	
1949–50	Division A	30	22	6	2	58	26	50	1st	W	SF	Willie Findlay	18	
1950–51	Division A	30	17	4	9	64	37	38	2nd	R2	Sect	Willie Thornton	19	
1951–52	Division A	30	16	9	5	61	31	41	2nd	QF	RU	Willie Thornton	27	
1952–53	Division A	30	18	7	5	80	39	43	1st	W	SF	Derek Grierson	31	
1953–54	Division A	30	13	8	9	56	35	34	4th	SF	SF	Willie Paton	22	
1954–55	Division A	30	19	3	8	67	33	41	3rd	R6	QF	Billy Simpson	23	
1955–56	Division One	34	22	8	4	85	27	52	1st	QF	SF	Johnny Hubbard	27	

=== European football era ===
Season	League									Scottish Cup	League Cup	European	Top goalscorer		Notes
Season	Division	P	W	D	L	F	A	Pts	Pos	Scottish Cup	League Cup	European	Name	Goals	Notes
1956–57	Division One	34	26	3	5	96	48	55	1st	R6	SR	European Cup - R2	Max Murray	36	
1957–58	Division One	34	22	5	7	89	49	49	2nd	SF	RU	European Cup - R1	Max Murray	35	
1958–59	Division One	34	21	8	5	92	51	50	1st	R3	SR	—	Max Murray	24	
1959–60	Division One	34	17	8	9	72	38	42	3rd	W	SR	European Cup - SF	Jimmy Millar	36	
1960–61	Division One	34	23	5	6	88	46	51	1st	R3	W	Cup Winners' Cup - RU	Ralph Brand	40	
1961–62	Division One	34	22	7	5	84	31	51	2nd	W	W	European Cup - QF	Ralph Brand	40	
1962–63	Division One	34	25	7	2	94	28	57	1st	W	SF	Cup Winners' Cup - R1	Jimmy Millar	43	
1963–64	Division One	34	25	5	4	85	31	55	1st	W	W	European Cup - QR	Jim Forrest	39	
1964–65	Division One	34	18	8	8	78	35	44	5th	QF	W	European Cup - QF	Jim Forrest	57	
1965–66	Division One	34	25	5	4	91	29	55	2nd	W	RU	—	George McLean	39	
1966–67	Division One	34	24	7	3	92	31	55	2nd	R1	RU	Cup Winners' Cup - RU	Alex Smith	23	
1967–68	Division One	34	28	5	1	93	34	61	2nd	QF	SR	Inter-Cities Fairs Cup - QF	Alex Ferguson	22	
1968–69	Division One	34	21	7	6	81	32	49	2nd	RU	SR	Inter-Cities Fairs Cup - SF	Willie Johnston	23	
1969–70	Division One	34	19	7	8	67	40	45	2nd	QF	SR	Cup Winners' Cup - R2	Colin Stein	27	
1970–71	Division One	34	16	9	9	58	34	41	4th	RU	W	Inter-Cities Fairs Cup - R1	Colin Stein	20	
1971–72	Division One	34	21	2	11	71	38	44	3rd	SF	SR	Cup Winners' Cup - W	Colin Stein	25	
1972–73	Division One	34	26	4	4	74	30	56	2nd	W	SF	—	Derek Parlane	27	
1973–74	Division One	34	21	6	7	67	34	48	3rd	R4	SF	Cup Winners' Cup - R2	Derek Parlane	22	
1974–75	Division One	34	25	6	3	86	33	56	1st	R3	SR	—	Derek Parlane	18	
1975–76	Premier Division	36	23	8	5	60	24	54	1st	W	W	European Cup - R2	Derek Johnstone	31	
1976–77	Premier Division	36	18	10	8	62	37	46	2nd	RU	SF	European Cup - R1	Derek Johnstone	21	
1977–78	Premier Division	36	24	7	5	76	39	55	1st	W	W	Cup Winners' Cup - R1	Derek Johnstone	38	
1978–79	Premier Division	36	18	9	9	52	35	45	2nd	W	W	European Cup - QF	Gordon Smith	17	
1979–80	Premier Division	36	15	7	14	50	46	37	5th	RU	R3	Cup Winners' Cup - R2	Derek Johnstone	21	
1980–81	Premier Division	36	16	12	8	60	32	44	3rd	W	R3	—	Colin McAdam	21	
1981–82	Premier Division	36	16	11	9	57	45	43	3rd	RU	W	Cup Winners' Cup - R1	John MacDonald	22	
1982–83	Premier Division	36	13	12	11	52	41	38	4th	RU	RU	UEFA Cup - R2	John MacDonald	20	
1983–84	Premier Division	36	15	12	9	53	41	42	4th	QF	W	Cup Winners' Cup - R2	Ally McCoist	20	
1984–85	Premier Division	36	13	12	11	47	38	38	4th	R4	W	UEFA Cup - R2	Ally McCoist	18	
1985–86	Premier Division	36	13	9	14	53	45	35	5th	R3	SF	UEFA Cup - R1	Ally McCoist	27	
1986–87	Premier Division	44	31	7	6	85	23	69	1st	R3	W	UEFA Cup - R3	Ally McCoist	38	
1987–88	Premier Division	44	26	8	10	85	34	60	3rd	R4	W	European Cup - QF	Ally McCoist	42	
1988–89	Premier Division	36	26	4	6	62	26	56	1st	RU	W	UEFA Cup - R2	Kevin Drinkell	19	
1989–90	Premier Division	36	20	11	5	48	19	51	1st	R4	RU	European Cup - R1	Ally McCoist	18	
1990–91	Premier Division	36	24	7	5	62	23	55	1st	QF	W	European Cup - R2	Mo Johnston	19	
1991–92	Premier Division	44	33	6	5	101	31	72	1st	W	SF	European Cup - R1	Ally McCoist	39	
1992–93	Premier Division	44	33	7	4	97	35	73	1st	W	W	Champions League - GS	Ally McCoist	49	
1993–94	Premier Division	44	22	14	8	74	41	58	1st	RU	W	Champions League - R1	Mark Hateley	30	
1994–95	Premier Division	36	20	9	7	60	35	69	1st	R4	R3	Champions League - QR	Mark Hateley	15	
1995–96	Premier Division	36	27	6	3	85	25	87	1st	W	SF	Champions League- GS	Gordon Durie	23	
1996–97	Premier Division	36	25	5	6	85	33	80	1st	QF	W	Champions League - GS	Brian Laudrup	21	
1997–98	Premier Division	36	21	9	6	76	38	72	2nd	RU	QF	Champions League - QR2; UEFA Cup - R1	Marco Negri	37	
1998–99	Premier League	36	23	8	5	78	31	77	1st	W	W	UEFA Cup - R3	Rod Wallace	27	
1999–2000	Premier League	36	28	6	2	96	26	90	1st	W	QF	Champions League - GS; UEFA Cup - R3	Rod Wallace	21	
2000–01	Premier League	38	26	4	8	76	36	82	2nd	QF	SF	Champions League - GS; UEFA Cup - R3	Jörg Albertz	15	
2001–02	Premier League	38	25	10	3	82	27	85	2nd	W	W	Champions League - QR3; UEFA Cup - R4	Tore André Flo	25	
2002–03	Premier League	38	31	4	3	101	28	97	1st	W	W	UEFA Cup - R1	Ronald de Boer	20	
2003–04	Premier League	38	25	6	7	76	33	81	2nd	QF	SF	Champions League - GS	Shota Arveladze	15	
2004–05	Premier League	38	29	6	3	78	22	93	1st	R3	W	UEFA Cup - GS	Nacho Novo	25	
2005–06	Premier League	38	21	10	7	67	37	73	3rd	R4	QF	Champions League - L16	Kris Boyd	20	
2006–07	Premier League	38	21	9	8	61	32	72	2nd	R3	QF	UEFA Cup - L16	Kris Boyd	26	
2007–08	Premier League	38	27	5	6	84	33	86	2nd	W	W	Champions League - GS	Kris Boyd	25	
2007–08	Premier League	38	27	5	6	84	33	86	2nd	W	W	UEFA Cup - RU	Kris Boyd	25	
2008–09	Premier League	38	26	8	4	77	28	86	1st	W	RU	Champions League - QR2	Kris Boyd	31	
2009–10	Premier League	38	26	9	3	82	28	87	1st	QF	W	Champions League - GS	Kris Boyd	26	
2010–11	Premier League	38	30	3	5	88	29	93	1st	R5	W	Champions League - GS; Europa League - Ro16	Kenny Miller	22	
2011–12	Premier League	38	26	5	7	77	28	73†	2nd ↓↓↓	R5	R3	Champions League - QR3; Europa League - POR	Nikica Jelavić	17	
2012–13	Third Division	36	25	8	3	87	29	83	1st ↑	R5	QF	Challenge Cup - QF	Lee McCulloch	26	
2013–14	League One	36	33	3	0	106	18	102	1st ↑	SF	R1	Challenge Cup - RU	Jon Daly	25	
2014–15	Championship	36	19	10	7	69	39	67	3rd	R5	SF	Challenge Cup - SF	Nicky Law	13	
2015–16	Championship	36	25	6	5	88	34	81	1st ↑	RU	R4	Challenge Cup - W	Martyn Waghorn	28	
2016–17	Premiership	38	19	10	9	56	44	67	3rd	SF	SF	—	Martyn Waghorn	16	
2017–18	Premiership	38	21	7	10	76	50	70	3rd	SF	SF	Europa League - QR1	Alfredo Morelos; Josh Windass	18	
2018–19	Premiership	38	23	9	6	82	27	78	2nd	QF	SF	Europa League - GS	Alfredo Morelos	30	
2019–20	Premiership	29	21	4	4	64	19	67	2nd*	QF	RU	Europa League - Ro16	Alfredo Morelos	29	
2020–21	Premiership	38	32	6	0	92	13	102	1st	QF	QF	Europa League - Ro16	James Tavernier	19	
2021–22	Premiership	38	27	8	3	80	31	89	2nd	W	SF	Europa League - RU	Alfredo Morelos; James Tavernier	18	
2022–23	Premiership	38	29	5	4	93	37	92	2nd	SF	RU	Champions League - GS	James Tavernier; Antonio Čolak	18	
2023–24	Premiership	38	27	4	7	87	32	85	2nd	RU	W	Champions League - POR; Europa League - Ro16	James Tavernier	24	
2024–25	Premiership	38	22	9	7	80	41	75	2nd	R5	RU	Champions League - POR; Europa League - QF	Cyriel Dessers	22	
2025–26	Premiership	38	20	12	6	76	43	72	3rd	QF	SF	Champions League - POR; Europa League - LP	Youssef Chermiti	15	

^{†} Rangers were deducted 10 points when the club entered administration.
^{*} Season finished early due to COVID-19 pandemic.
