= 1892–93 Rangers F.C. season =

Rangers
1892–93 season
- President: Dugald MacKenzie
- Match Secretary: William Wilton
- Ground: Ibrox Park
- Scottish League: 2nd
- Scottish Cup: Quarter-finals
- Top goalscorer: League: Hugh McCreadie (10); All: Hugh McCreadie (13)

The 1892–93 season was the 19th season of competitive football by Rangers.

== Overview ==
Rangers played a total of 21 competitive matches during the 1892–93 season. They finished second in the Scottish League behind first-time winners Celtic, with a record of 12 wins from 18 matches.

The club ended the season without the Scottish Cup after being beaten at the quarter-final stage by St Bernard's, 3–2. They had previously defeated Annbank United and Dumbarton during the cup run.

Rangers reached the finals of both the Glasgow Cup and the Glasgow Merchants' Charity Cup and played both against Celtic, winning the Glasgow Cup 3-1 and losing the Charity Cup 5-0.

== Results ==
All results are written with Rangers' score first.

=== Scottish League ===
Date	Opponent	Venue	Result	Attendance	Scorers
20 August 1892	Abercorn	A	4–0		Bruce (2), J.McPherson, Barker
22 August 1892	Leith Athletic	H	3–2	5,000	McInnes (2), D.McPherson
3 September 1892	Dumbarton	H	3–2	6,000	Bruce (2), Barker
10 September 1892	Third Lanark	A	4–2	8,000	A.McCreadie (pen.), Bruce, H.McCreadie, Unknown
24 September 1892	Celtic	H	2–2	14,000	Turnbull, H.McCreadie
1 October 1892	Leith Athletic	A	2–1	5,000	H.McCreadie (2)
15 October 1892	St Mirren	H	0–0	4,000	
22 October 1892	Clyde	H	4–1		J.McPherson (2), Kerr, Mitchell
5 November 1892	Renton	A	2–2		Clark, H.McCreadie
4 February 1893	Abercorn	H	4–3		H.McCreadie (2), J.McPherson, Kerr (pen.)
11 March 1893	Clyde	A	3–0		H.McCreadie, Kerr, J.McPherson
18 March 1893	Hearts	A	2–1		Kerr, Steel
25 March 1893	St Mirren	A	2–2		J.McPherson, Dick
1 April 1893	Third Lanark	H	2–1	3,000	H.McCreadie, Barker
15 April 1893	Renton	H	2–0		Drummond, Scott
22 April 1893	Dumbarton	A	0–3		
29 April 1893	Celtic	A	0–3		
6 May 1893	Hearts	H	2–1		J.McPherson, H.McCreadie

=== Scottish Cup ===
Date	Round	Opponent	Venue	Result	Attendance	Scorers
26 November 1892	R1	Annbank	H	7–0		Kerr (4), H.McCreadie (2), Clark
21 January 1893	R2	Dumbarton	A	1–0		H.McCreadie
28 January 1893	QF	St Bernard's	A	2–3	8,000	Barker, Untraced

== Appearances ==
Player	Position	Appearances	Goals
(Scotland) David Haddow	GK	21	0
(Scotland) Robert Scott	DF	10	1
(Scotland) Jock Drummond	DF	20	1
(Scotland) Robert Marshall	DF	21	0
(Scotland) Andrew McCreadie	DF	17	1
(Scotland) David Mitchell	MF	19	1
(Scotland) David McPherson	MF	9	1
(Scotland) McInnes	MF	4	2
(Scotland) Fleming	FW	4	5
(Scotland) John McPherson	MF	21	7
(Scotland) John Barker	MF	14	4
(Scotland) Peter Turnbull	FW	2	1
(Scotland) Donald Gow	DF	11	0
(Scotland) Hugh McCreadie	MF	18	13
(Scotland) Neil Kerr	FW	16	8
(Scotland) Allan Martin	FW	2	0
(Scotland) Clark	FW	3	2
(Scotland) David Freebairn	DF	2	0
(Scotland) James Davie	MF	6	0
(Scotland) Frank Muir	DF	2	0
(Scotland) Dick	MF	2	1
(Scotland) James Steel	FW	2	1
(Scotland) Nicol Smith	DF	2	1
(Scotland) R. Reid	FW	2	1
(Scotland) William Hay	DF	1	0

== League table ==
Pos	Team	Pld	W	D	L	GF	GA	GD	Pts	Qualification or relegation
1	Celtic (C)	18	14	1	3	54	25	+29	29	Champions
2	Rangers	18	12	4	2	41	27	+14	28	
3	St Mirren	18	9	2	7	40	39	+1	20	
4	Third Lanark	18	9	1	8	53	39	+14	19	
5	Heart of Midlothian	18	8	2	8	39	41	−2	18	
6	Dumbarton	18	8	1	9	35	35	0	17	
6	Leith Athletic	18	8	1	9	35	31	+4	17	
8	Renton	18	5	5	8	31	44	−13	15	Re-elected
9	Abercorn (R)	18	5	1	12	35	52	−17	11	Not re-elected. Joined the 1893–94 Scottish Division Two
10	Clyde (R)	18	2	2	14	25	55	−30	6	Not re-elected. Joined the 1893–94 Scottish Division Two

Source: statto.com
Rules for classification: Teams finish equal if level on points. Points system: 2 points for a win, 1 point for a draw, 0 points for a loss
(C) Champions; (R) Relegated

== See also ==
- 1892–93 in Scottish football
- 1892–93 Scottish Cup
