= 1893–94 Rangers F.C. season =

Rangers
1893–94 season
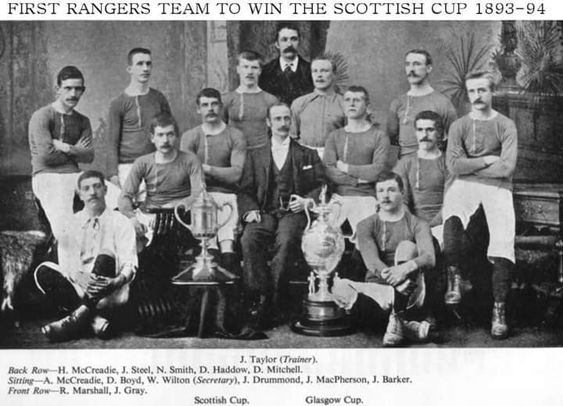
- Rangers F.C., 1893–94
- President: Dugald MacKenzie
- Match Secretary: William Wilton
- Ground: Ibrox Park
- Scottish League Division One: 4th
- Scottish Cup: Winners
- Top goalscorer: League: John Gray (9); All: James Steel (12)

The 1893–94 season was the 20th season of competitive football by Rangers.

== Overview ==
Rangers played a total of 23 competitive matches during the 1893–94 season. They finished a lowly fourth in the Scottish League Division One with only 8 wins from 18 matches.

However, the club did win the Scottish Cup after being Celtic in the final by 3–1. Hugh McCreadie opened the scoring in the 55th minute then Barker and John McPherson added to the tally in the following thirteen minutes. This was the first ever Scottish Cup final to feature Rangers versus Celtic.

== Results ==
All results are written with Rangers' score first.

=== Scottish League Division One ===
Date	Opponent	Venue	Result	Attendance	Scorers
12 August 1893	Dundee	A	3–3	6,000	Gray (3)
19 August 1893	Renton	H	5–3	5,000	Gray (2), Kerr, Barker, Steel
26 August 1893	St Bernard's	A	0–0	5,000	
2 September 1893	Celtic	H	5–0	18,000	Barker (3), McPherson, Gray
9 September 1893	Renton	A	2–1		Steel, Barker
23 September 1893	Dumbarton	H	4–0		H.McCreadie (2), Marshall, Unknown
30 September 1893	Leith Athletic	A	2–2	4,000	Steel (2)
14 October 1893	Heart of Midlothian	A	2–4	8,000	Blyth, Gray
4 November 1893	Leith Athletic	H	1–0	3,000	McPherson
11 November 1893	Third Lanark	A	2–1		McPherson, Boyd
23 December 1893	Third Lanark	H	0–3	5,000	
20 January 1894	Dumbarton	A	0–2		
27 January 1894	St Mirren	A	2–2		Boyd, Crawford (o.g.)
24 February 1894	Celtic	A	2–3	10,000	Gray, Barker
10 March 1894	Dundee	H	7–2	3,000	Boyd (2), Steel (2), Barker, A.McCreadie, Mitchell
14 April 1894	Heart of Midlothian	H	1–2	4,000	Boyd
2 May 1894	St Bernard's	H	1–2	1,000	Gray
21 May 1894	St Mirren	H	5–0	4,000	Steel, Unknown (4)

=== Scottish Cup ===
Date	Round	Opponent	Venue	Result	Attendance	Scorers
25 November 1893	R1	Cowlairs	H	8–0	5,000	McPherson (2), Boyd (3), Unknown (o.g.), H.McCreadie, Kerr
16 December 1893	R2	Leith Athletic	H	2–0	2,5000	McPherson, Blyth
13 January 1894	QF	Clyde	A	5–0	10,000	Steel (4), McPherson
3 February 1894	SF	Queen's Park	H	1–1	15,000	Boyd
10 February 1894	SF Rpl	Queen's Park	A	3–1	16,000	Smith, McPherson, Steel
17 February 1894	F	Celtic	N	3–1	17,000	H.McCreadie, Barker, McPherson

== Appearances ==
Player	Position	Appearances	Goals
(Scotland) David Haddow	GK	21	0
(Scotland) Nicol Smith	DF	23	1
(Scotland) Jock Drummond	DF	23	0
(Scotland) Robert Marshall	DF	24	1
(Scotland) Andrew McCreadie	DF	24	1
(Scotland) David Mitchell	MF	20	1
(Scotland) James Steel	FW	19	12
(Scotland) Hugh McCreadie	MF	14	5
(Scotland) John Gray	FW	23	9
(Scotland) John McPherson	MF	21	9
(Scotland) John Barker	MF	16	8
(Scotland) Neil Kerr	MF	7	2
(Scotland) Archibald McKenzie	GK	1	0
(Scotland) Bob Blyth	MF	6	2
(Scotland) David Boyd	MF	14	9
(Scotland) John Muir	DF	4	0
(Scotland) R.Drummond	DF	1	0
(Scotland) John Johnstone	MF	1	0
(Scotland) Archie Montgomery	GK	1	0
(Scotland) James Davie	MF	1	0

== League table ==
Pos	Team	Pld	W	D	L	GF	GA	GD	Pts	Relegation
1	Celtic (C)	18	14	1	3	53	32	+21	29	Champions
2	Heart of Midlothian	18	11	4	3	46	32	+14	26	
3	St Bernard's	18	11	1	6	53	39	+14	23	
4	Rangers	18	8	4	6	44	30	+14	20	
5	Dumbarton	18	7	5	6	32	35	−3	19	
6	St Mirren	18	7	3	8	49	47	+2	17	
7	Third Lanark	18	7	3	8	38	44	−6	17	
8	Dundee	18	6	3	9	47	59	−12	15	
9	Leith Athletic	18	4	2	12	36	46	−10	10	
10	Renton (R)	18	1	2	15	23	57	−34	4	Relegated to the 1894–95 Scottish Division Two

Source: worldfootball.net, Scottish Professional Football League
Rules for classification: Points system: 2 points for a win, 1 point for a draw, 0 points for a loss.
(C) Champions; (R) Relegated

== See also ==
- 1893–94 in Scottish football
- 1893–94 Scottish Cup
