= 1891–92 Rangers F.C. season =

Rangers
1891–92 season
- President: Dugald MacKenzie
- Match Secretary: William Wilton
- Ground: Ibrox Park
- Scottish League: 5th
- Scottish Cup: Semi-finals
- Top goalscorer: League: John McPherson (10); All: John McPherson (12)

The 1891–92 season was the 18th season of competitive football by Rangers.

== Overview ==
Rangers played a total of 28 competitive matches during the 1891–92 season. The club began the season as champions but ended it in fifth position, winning exactly half of their 22 league matches.

The club were knocked out the Scottish Cup at the semi-final stage after losing to eventual champions Celtic by 3–5.

Rangers reached the final of the Glasgow Merchants' Charity Cup for the first time in eight years, but lost the final 2-0 to Celtic at Celtic Park.

== Results ==
All results are written with Rangers' score first.

=== Scottish League ===
Date	Opponent	Venue	Result	Attendance	Scorers
15 August 1891	Renton	A	4–1		Muir (2), Kerr, McPherson
22 August 1891	Celtic	A	0–3	12,000	
29 August 1891	Third Lanark	H	2–3	5,106	McKenzie (2)
5 September 1891	Dumbarton	H	1–3	5,000	Kerr
12 September 1891	Vale of Leven	A	6–1		Unknown (6)
26 September 1891	Abercorn	H	6–2	3,000	Fraser (3), McPherson (2), Kerr
3 October 1891	Leith Athletic	A	1–3		Kerr
10 October 1891	Third Lanark	A	2–2	5,000	H.McCreadie, Fraser
17 October 1891	Cambuslang	H	2–1	3,000	Marshall, Blyth
24 October 1891	Clyde	H	1–5	5,000	Kerr
21 November 1891	Heart of Midlothian	H	0–1	3,000	
5 December 1891	St. Mirren	A	4–3		McPherson (2), Kerr, McGowan
13 February 1892	Vale of Leven	H	7–0	2,000	Law (3), McBain, Barker, Kerr, A.McCreadie
27 February 1892	Cambuslang	A	6–0		Barker, McPherson, Unknown (4)
19 March 1892	Renton	H	5–2	6,000	Barker (3), A.McCreadie, McPherson
26 March 1892	Abercorn	A	1–0		Law
16 April 1892	Leith Athletic	H	3–2		McBain, McPherson, A McCreadie
23 April 1892	Heart of Midlothian	A	2–3	5,000	Scott, McPherson
4 May 1892	Dumbarton	A	0–6	1,000	
7 May 1892	Celtic	H	1–1		H.McCreadie
10 May 1892	St Mirren	H	2–3		A.McCreadie, Allan
21 May 1892	Clyde	A	3–1		McPherson, A.McCreadie (pen.), Bowie (o.g.)

=== Scottish Cup ===
Date	Round	Opponent	Venue	Result	Attendance	Scorers
28 November 1891	R1	St Bernard's	H	5–1	3,000	Kerr, Blyth, McPherson, McBain, Unknown
19 December 1891	R2	Kilmarnock	H	0–0	2,000	
26 December 1891	R2 R	Kilmarnock	A	1–1	3,000	Kerr
23 January 1892	R2 R	Kilmarnock	N	3–2	5,000	Henderson (2), McPherson
30 January 1892	QF	Annbank United	H	2–0	5,000	Watt, H.McCreadie
6 February 1892	SF	Celtic	A	3–5	12,000	Law, Henderson, Kerr

== Appearances ==
Player	Position	Appearances	Goals
(Scotland) David Haddow	GK	28	0
(Scotland) Hay	DF	1	0
(Scotland) William Hodge	DF	21	0
(Scotland) Robert Marshall	DF	26	1
(Scotland) James McIntyre	DF	2	0
(Scotland) David Mitchell	MF	23	0
(Scotland) Hugh McCreadie	MF	20	3
(Scotland) James Henderson	MF	12	3
(Scotland) Neil Kerr	FW	26	10
(Scotland) John Muir	FW	5	2
(Scotland) John McPherson	MF	24	12
(Scotland) Scott	DF	13	1
(Scotland) Cullen	MF	5	0
(Scotland) Andrew McCreadie	DF	24	5
(Scotland) Archibald McKenzie	FW	2	2
(Scotland) Tait	DF	6	0
(Scotland) Fraser	MF	4	4
(Scotland) Fleming	MF	1	0
(Scotland) Bob Blyth	MF	6	2
(Scotland) J.Steel	FW	3	0
(Scotland) Glass	MF	1	0
(Scotland) Tom Dunbar	DF	17	0
(Scotland) McGowan	FW	3	1
(Scotland) McBain	MF	6	3
(Scotland) J.Law	FW	7	5
(Scotland) John Barker	MF	8	5
(Scotland) Frank Watt	MF	4	1
(Scotland) Jock Drummond	DF	4	0
(Scotland) Allan	MF	3	1
(Scotland) D.McPherson	MF	2	0
(Scotland) Peter Turnbull	FW	1	0

== League table ==
Pos	Team	Pld	W	D	L	GF	GA	GD	Pts	Qualification or relegation
1	Dumbarton (C)	22	18	1	3	79	28	+51	37	Champions
2	Celtic	22	16	3	3	62	21	+41	35	
3	Heart of Midlothian	22	15	4	3	65	35	+30	34	
4	Leith Athletic	22	12	1	9	51	40	+11	25	
5	Rangers	22	11	2	9	59	46	+13	24	
6	Renton	22	8	5	9	38	44	−6	21	
6	3rd LRV	22	8	5	9	44	47	−3	21	
8	Clyde	22	8	4	10	63	62	+1	20	
9	Abercorn	22	6	5	11	45	59	−14	17	
10	St Mirren	22	5	5	12	43	60	−17	15	Re-elected
11	Cambuslang	22	2	6	14	21	53	−32	10	Not re-elected
12	Vale of Leven	22	0	5	17	24	99	−75	5	Not re-elected

Rules for classification: 1) Points;
(C) Champions

== See also ==
- 1891–92 in Scottish football
- 1891–92 Scottish Cup
