= 1890–91 Rangers F.C. season =

Rangers
1890–91 season
- President: James Watson
- Match Secretary: William Wilton
- Ground: Ibrox Park
- Scottish League: Joint Winners
- Scottish Cup: First round
- Top goalscorer: League: John McPherson (15); All: John McPherson (15)

The 1890–91 season was the 17th season of competitive football by Rangers.

The season saw the club play in a league set-up for the first time in its history.

== Overview ==
Rangers played a total of 20 competitive matches during the 1890–91 season. They were the joint winners of the first ever Scottish League, sharing the title with Dumbarton. The club's drew the championship play-off 2–2, so both were awarded the title and declared champions.

The club ended the season without the Scottish Cup after being knocked out by Celtic in the first round by 1–0.

== Results ==
All results are written with Rangers' score first.

=== Scottish League ===
Date	Opponent	Venue	Result	Attendance	Scorers
16 August 1890	Heart of Midlothian	H	5–2	3,400	Kerr (2), H.McCreadie, McPherson, Adams (o.g.)
23 August 1890	Cambuslang	A	6–2		McPherson (4), Gow, Marshall
13 September 1890	Dumbarton	A	1–5	4,000	Hislop
4 October 1890	St. Mirren	H	8–2		McPherson (5), Kerr (3)
18 October 1890	Cowlairs	H	1–1		Hislop
17 January 1891	Vale of Leven	A	3–1		McPherson (pen.), Hislop, Henderson
24 January 1891	Heart of Midlothian	A	1–0	5,000	Kerr
7 February 1891	Abercorn	A	1–1		Marshall
21 February 1891	Cambuslang	H	2–1	2,000	H.McCreadie, McPherson
28 February 1891	St. Mirren	A	7–3		H.McCreadie (2), Henderson (2), Kerr, McPherson, Sloan (o.g.)
7 March 1891	Third Lanark	A	4–0		McPherson, Untraced (3)
14 March 1891	Abercorn	H	2–0	5,000	H.McCreadie, Henderson
21 March 1891	Celtic	A	2–2	12,000	A.McCreadie, Hislop
28 March 1891	Cowlairs	A	2–0		Henderson, Hislop
4 April 1891	Vale of Leven	H	4–0	2,000	Hislop (2), Untraced (2)
25 April 1891	Dumbarton	H	4–2	12,000	A.McCreadie, Hislop, Kerr, McPherson
2 May 1891	Celtic	H	1–2	10,000	Henderson
9 May 1891	Third Lanark	H	4–1		McKenzie (3), Hislop

==== Championship play-off ====
Date	Opponent	Venue	Result	Attendance	Scorers
18 May 1891	Dumbarton	N	2–2	10,000	Hislop, H.McCreadie

=== Scottish Cup ===
Date	Round	Opponent	Venue	Result	Attendance	Scorers
6 September 1890	R1	Celtic	A	0–1	16,000	

== Appearances ==
Player	Position	Appearances	Goals
(Scotland) David Mitchell	MF	20	0
(Scotland) Neil Kerr	MF	20	8
(Scotland) John McPherson	FW	20	15
(Scotland) David Hislop	FW	20	10
(Scotland) David Reid	GK	18	0
(Scotland) Donald Gow	DF	18	1
(Scotland) Robert Marshall	MF	18	2
(Scotland) Andrew McCreadie	DF	17	2
(Scotland) Hugh McCreadie	FW	16	6
(Scotland) James Henderson	FW	14	6
(Scotland) William Hodge	DF	10	0
(Scotland) James McIntyre	DF	9	0
(Scotland) John Muir	DF	9	0
(Scotland) Thomas Wyllie	MF	5	0
(Scotland) Archibald McKenzie	GK	3	3
(Scotland) John White	MF	2	0
(Scotland) William Wilson	MF	1	0

== League table ==
Pos	Team	Pld	W	D	L	GF	GA	GD	Pts	Qualification or relegation
1	Dumbarton (Note: Dumbarton and Rangers finished equal on points, and a play-off to determine the winner ended in a 2−2 draw so both teams were declared joint champions.) (C)	18	13	3	2	61	21	+40	29	Joint Champions
1	Rangers (C)	18	13	3	2	58	25	+33	29	Joint Champions
3	Celtic	18	11	3	4	48	21	+27	21 (Note: Celtic, 3rd LRV and Cowlairs were deducted four points each for fielding ineligible players.)	
4	Cambuslang	18	8	4	6	47	42	+5	20	
5	3rd LRV	18	8	3	7	38	39	−1	15	
6	Heart of Midlothian	18	6	2	10	31	37	−6	14	
7	Abercorn	18	5	2	11	36	47	−11	12	
8	St Mirren	18	5	1	12	39	62	−23	11	Re-elected
8	Vale of Leven	18	5	1	12	27	65	−38	11	Re-elected
10	Cowlairs (Note: Cowlairs failed re-election to compete in the league for the next season.) (R)	18	3	4	11	24	50	−26	6	Not re-elected
11	Renton (Note: Renton were expelled from the league in September 1890 for professionalism and their record was expunged.)	0	0	0	0	0	0	0	0	Expelled, record expunged

Rules for classification: 1) Points;
(C) Champions; (R) Relegated

== See also ==
- 1890–91 in Scottish football
- 1890–91 Scottish Cup
