= 1884–85 Rangers F.C. season =

Rangers
1884–85 season
- President: James Watson
- Match Secretary: John Wallace MacKay
- Ground: Kinning Park
- Scottish Cup: Sixth round

The 1884–85 season was the 11th season of competitive football by Rangers.

== Overview ==
Rangers played a total of 8 competitive matches during the 1884–85 season.

== Results ==
All results are written with Rangers' score first.

=== Scottish Cup ===
Date	Round	Opponent	Venue	Result	Attendance	Scorers
13 September 1884	R1	Whitehill	H	11–0	1,500	
4 October 1884	R2	Third Lanark	A	2–2	6,000	
11 October 1884	R2 R	Third Lanark	H	0–0	7,000	
25 October 1884	R3	Third Lanark	A	3–0	4,000	
15 November 1884	R4	Arbroath	H	3–4	2,000	Replay ordered
6 December 1884	R5	Bye				
20 December 1884	R4 R	Arbroath	A	8–1	2,000	
27 December 1884	R6	Renton	A	3–5	3,500	

== Appearances ==
Player	Position	Appearances	Goals
(Scotland) David Mitchell	MF	20	0
(Scotland) Neil Kerr	MF	20	8
(Scotland) John McPherson	FW	20	15
(Scotland) David Hislop	FW	20	10
(Scotland) David Reid	GK	18	0
(Scotland) Donald Gow	DF	18	1
(Scotland) Robert Marshall	MF	18	2
(Scotland) Andrew McCreadie	DF	17	2
(Scotland) Hugh McCreadie	FW	16	6
(Scotland) James Henderson	FW	14	6
(Scotland) William Hodge	DF	10	0
(Scotland) James McIntyre	DF	9	0
(Scotland) John Muir	DF	9	0
(Scotland) Thomas Wyllie	MF	5	0
(Scotland) Archibald McKenzie	GK	3	3
(Scotland) John White	MF	2	0
(Scotland) William Wilson	MF	1	0

== See also ==
- 1884–85 in Scottish football
- 1884–85 Scottish Cup
