= 1894–95 Rangers F.C. season =

Rangers
1894–95 season
- President: Dugald MacKenzie
- Match Secretary: William Wilton
- Ground: Ibrox Park
- Scottish League Division One: 3rd
- Scottish Cup: First round
- Top goalscorer: League: John McPherson, John Barker (9); All: John McPherson, John Barker (9)

The 1894–95 season was the 21st season of competitive football by Rangers.

== Overview ==
Rangers played a total of 19 competitive matches during the 1894–95 season. They finished third in the Scottish League Division One, behind Celtic and winners Heart of Midlothian, with a record of 10 wins from 18 matches.

The club ended the season without the Scottish Cup. They were knocked out of the first round by Heart of Midlothian, losing 2–1 at home.

== Results ==
All results are written with Rangers' score first.

=== Scottish League Division One ===
Date	Opponent	Venue	Result	Attendance	Scorers
18 August 1894	Dumbarton	H	3–0		Barker (2), Untraced
25 August 1894	St. Bernard's	A	4–1		McPherson (2), Barker (2)
1 September 1894	Dundee	H	1–0	4,000	W.Gibson
8 September 1894	Leith Athletic	A	4–3		Barker (2), Mitchell, Cowan
22 September 1894	Celtic	A	3–5	20,000	Gray, Barker, McPherson
29 September 1894	St. Mirren	H	4–3	5,000	McPherson (2), Cowan, Goldie (o.g.)
13 October 1894	Third Lanark	A	2–0	10,000	Hamilton, Untraced
20 October 1894	Heart of Midlothian	H	0–1	10,000	
3 November 1894	Leith Athletic	H	5–1		A.Smith (2), Gray, McPherson, McCreadie
1 December 1894	Dumbarton	A	0–1		
8 December 1894	Clyde	A	5–1		Barker (2), Gray (2), Cowan
22 December 1894	Clyde	H	4–1		McPherson, Untraced (3)
19 January 1895	Heart of Midlothian	A	0–0	10,000	
26 January 1895	Dundee	A	1–2	6,000	McCreadie
16 February 1895	Third Lanark	H	0–1	4,000	
9 March 1895	St. Mirren	A	2–4		McPherson, Boyd
23 March 1895	Celtic	H	1–1		McPherson
27 April 1895	St. Bernard's	H	2–1	5,000	Boyd, A.Smith

=== Scottish Cup ===
Date	Round	Opponent	Venue	Result	Attendance	Scorers
24 November 1894	R1	Heart of Midlothian	H	1–2	12,000	Cowan

== Appearances ==
Player	Position	Appearances	Goals
(Scotland) David Haddow	GK	12	0
(Scotland) Nicol Smith	DF	6	0
(Scotland) Jock Drummond	DF	17	0
(Scotland) Robert Marshall	DF	16	0
(Scotland) Willie Gibson	DF	18	1
(Scotland) David Mitchell	MF	11	1
(Scotland) John Cowan	MF	17	4
(Scotland) Hugh McCreadie	MF	14	2
(Scotland) David Boyd	MF	13	2
(Scotland) John McPherson	MF	18	9
(Scotland) John Barker	MF	16	9
(Scotland) Nicol Smith	DF	14	0
(Scotland) John Gray	FW	8	4
(Scotland) Jack Pray	DF	4	0
(Scotland) Archie Montgomery	GK	7	0
(Scotland) James Hamilton	FW	2	1
(Scotland) Alex Smith	FW	6	3
(Scotland) Neilly Gibson	MF	8	0
(Scotland) Henry Gardiner	DF	2	0

== League table ==
Pos	Team	Pld	W	D	L	GF	GA	GD	Pts	Qualification or relegation
1	Heart of Midlothian (C)	18	15	1	2	50	18	+32	31	Champions
2	Celtic	18	11	4	3	50	29	+21	26	
3	Rangers	18	10	2	6	41	26	+15	22	
4	Third Lanark	18	10	1	7	51	39	+12	21	
5	St Mirren	18	9	1	8	34	34	0	19	
6	St Bernard's	18	8	1	9	37	40	−3	17	
7	Clyde	18	8	0	10	38	47	−9	16	
8	Dundee	18	6	2	10	28	33	−5	14	
9	Dumbarton	18	3	1	14	27	58	−31	7	
10	Leith Athletic (R)	18	3	1	14	32	64	−32	7	Relegated to the 1895–96 Scottish Division Two

Source: "1894-1895 Division 1 - SPFL Archive". SPFL.
Rules for classification: Teams finish equal if level on points. Points system: 2 points for a win, 1 point for a draw, 0 points for a loss
(C) Champions; (R) Relegated

== See also ==
- 1894–95 in Scottish football
- 1894–95 Scottish Cup
