= 1895–96 Rangers F.C. season =

Rangers
1895–96 season
- President: Dugald MacKenzie
- Match Secretary: William Wilton
- Ground: Ibrox Park
- Scottish League Division One: 2nd
- Scottish Cup: Quarter-finals
- Top goalscorer: League: Alex Smith (13); All: Alex Smith (16)

The 1895–96 season was the 22nd season of competitive football by Rangers.

== Overview ==
Rangers played a total of 22 competitive matches during the 1895–96 season. They finished second in the Scottish League Division One with a record of 11 wins from 18 matches.

The club ended the season without the Scottish Cup after being knocked out in the quarter-final stage by Hibernian by 3–2. The club had beaten Dumbarton and St Mirren during the competition.

== Results ==
All results are written with Rangers' score first.

=== Scottish League Division One ===
Date	Opponent	Venue	Result	Attendance	Scorers
17 August 1895	Dumbarton	A	5–3		Miller (2), Barker (2), A.Smith
24 August 1895	Third Lanark	H	0–4		
31 August 1895	Heart of Midlothian	A	2–1		Oswald, Untraced
7 September 1895	Celtic	H	2–4	16,000	Stewart, A.Smith
14 September 1895	St. Bernard's	A	4–3		McPherson, Miller, A.Smith, Untraced
5 October 1895	St Mirren	A	7–1		A.Smith (4), McPherson, Oswald, McCreadie
12 October 1895	St. Bernard's	H	2–0	4,000	A.Smith, McPherson
26 October 1895	Hibernian	A	1–1	8,000	Barker
9 November 1895	Clyde	H	4–4	4,000	Oswald (2), McPherson, Mitchell
23 November 1895	Hibernian	H	4–0	6,000	Oswald (2), Barker, McPherson
30 November 1895	Dundee	A	3–1	3,000	Marshall, Barker, Oswald
7 December 1895	Heart of Midlothian	H	7–2		Oswald (3), N.Gibson, Barker, McPherson, Untraced
14 December 1895	Celtic	A	2–6	25,000	A Smith, McCreadie
21 December 1895	Third Lanark	A	3–2	5,000	A.Smith, McCreadie, Boyd
4 January 1896	Dumbarton	H	3–1	2,000	Oswald, McCreadie, Miller (o.g.)
8 February 1896	Clyde	A	2–2		Stewart, A.Smith
22 February 1896	St Mirren	H	3–3	3,000	A.Smith (2), Miller
29 February 1896	Dundee	H	3–1	3,000	McCreadie (2), McPherson

=== Scottish Cup ===
Date	Round	Opponent	Venue	Result	Attendance	Scorers
18 January 1896	R1	Dumbarton	A	1–1		Stewart
25 January 1896	R1 R	Dumbarton	H	3–1	6,000	A.Smith (2), Oswald
1 February 1896	R2	St Mirren	H	5–0	4,500	Oswald (3), McPherson, McCreadie
15 February 1896	QF	Hibernian	H	2–3	18,000	A.Smith, McCreadie

== Appearances ==
Player	Position	Appearances	Goals
(Scotland) Mungo Murdoch	GK	1	0
(Scotland) Nicol Smith	DF	21	0
(Scotland) Jock Drummond	DF	18	0
(Scotland) Robert Marshall	DF	16	1
(Scotland) Alex Mathie	DF	1	0
(Scotland) Neilly Gibson	MF	21	1
(Scotland) McIntyre	MF	3	0
(Scotland) Thomas Miller	MF	8	4
(Scotland) John Barker	MF	12	6
(Scotland) David Boyd	MF	4	1
(Scotland) Alex Smith	FW	21	16
(Scotland) William Wilson	GK	3	0
(Scotland) Jimmy Oswald	FW	21	15
(Scotland) John McPherson	MF	20	8
(Scotland) George Russell	DF	2	0
(Scotland) Stewart	MF	11	3
(Scotland) John McLeod	GK	5	0
(Scotland) David Crawford	DF	4	0
(Scotland) David Mitchell	MF	16	1
(Scotland) Robert Burns	DF	6	0
(Scotland) Hugh McCreadie	MF	14	8
(Scotland) John Bell	GK	7	0
(Scotland) Muir	MF	1	0
(Scotland) James Yuille	GK	1	0
(Scotland) James McAllan	GK	1	0

== League table ==
Pos	Team	Pld	W	D	L	GF	GA	GD	Pts	Qualification or relegation
1	Celtic (C)	18	15	0	3	64	25	+39	30	Champions
2	Rangers	18	11	4	3	57	39	+18	26	
3	Hibernian	18	11	2	5	58	39	+19	24	
4	Heart of Midlothian	18	11	0	7	68	36	+32	22	
5	Dundee	18	7	2	9	33	42	−9	16	
6	St Bernard's	18	7	1	10	36	53	−17	15	
6	Third Lanark	18	7	1	10	47	51	−4	15	
8	St Mirren	18	5	3	10	31	51	−20	13	
9	Clyde	18	4	3	11	39	59	−20	11	
10	Dumbarton (R)	18	4	0	14	36	74	−38	8	Relegated to the 1896–97 Scottish Division Two

Source: "1895-1896 Division 1 - SPFL Archive". SPFL.
Rules for classification: Teams finish equal if level on points. Points system: 2 points for a win, 1 point for a draw, 0 points for a loss
(C) Champions; (R) Relegated

== See also ==
- 1895–96 in Scottish football
- 1895–96 Scottish Cup
