= Willie Nicholson =

Scottish footballer

Personal information
- Full name: William G Nicholson
- Place of birth: Glasgow, Scotland
- Position: Outside left

Senior career*
Years	Team	Apps	(Gls)
1924–1929	Queen's Park	157	(29)
1929–1935	Rangers	70	(15)
1935–1936	St Johnstone	42	(11)

International career
1928–1929	Scotland Amateurs	2	(0)
1934	Scottish League XI	1	(0)
- * Club domestic league appearances and goals

William G. Nicholson was a Scottish professional football outside left who made over 260 appearances in the Scottish League for Queen's Park and Rangers.

== Honours ==
Rangers

- Scottish League First Division (3): 1929–30, 1933–34, 1934–35
- Scottish Cup (1): 1933–34
