= 1889–90 Rangers F.C. season =

Rangers
1889–90 season
- President: James Watson
- Match Secretary: William Wilton
- Ground: Ibrox Park
- Scottish Cup: Third round

The 1889–90 season was the 16th season of competitive football by Rangers.

== Overview ==
Rangers played a total of 4 competitive matches during the 1889–90 season.

== Results ==
All results are written with Rangers' score first.

=== Scottish Cup ===
Date	Round	Opponent	Venue	Result	Attendance	Scorers
7 September 1889	R1	United Abstainers Athletic	H	6–2		
28 September 1889	R2	Kelvinside Athletic	A	13–0		
19 October 1889	R3	Vale of Leven	H	0–0		
26 October 1889	R3 R	Vale of Leven	A	2–3		

== See also ==
- 1889–90 in Scottish football
- 1889–90 Scottish Cup
