= Alex Smith (footballer, born 1940) =

Scottish footballer

Personal information
- Full name: Alexander Smith
- Date of birth: 11 December 1940 (age 85)
- Place of birth: Scotland
- Position: Forward

Senior career*
Years	Team	Apps	(Gls)
1958–1966	Dunfermline Athletic	213	(68)
1966–1969	Rangers	41	(20)
1969	Aberdeen	1	(0)
- * Club domestic league appearances and goals

Alexander Smith (born 11 December 1940) is a former professional Scottish footballer who played for both Rangers and Dunfermline Athletic. He played as an inside-forward.

Smith was signed to Dunfermline in May 1958 by then manager Andy Dickson from junior side Dunbar United. He made his debut in September that year against Raith Rovers; however, the game was abandoned.

During his eight-year spell at East End Park he made 298 appearances and scored 98 goals. He won the 1961 Scottish Cup and played in the Scottish Cup final 1965 and European matches against the likes of Valencia and Athletic Bilbao.

In August 1966, Smith signed for Rangers for a then Scottish record transfer fee of £55,000. He made his debut on 13 August in a Scottish League Cup match versus Hibernian. He would stay at the club until in 1969 and make 68 appearances and score 26 goals, including playing in the 1967 European Cup Winners' Cup Final. Indeed, in that season he was top scorer for the club with 23 goals.

He left Ibrox for a brief spell at Aberdeen before becoming a landlord of a pub in Coaledge.

In 2010, a short documentary was made about Alex Smith and his football career.

His great grandchildren, Hannah and Matt Smith have played representative rugby for Scotland.
