= 1953–54 Rangers F.C. season =

Rangers
1953–54 season
- Chairman: John Wilson
- Manager: Bill Struth
- Ground: Ibrox Park
- Scottish League Division One: 4th P30 W13 D8 L9 F56 A35 Pts34
- Scottish Cup: Semi-finals
- League Cup: Semi-finals
- Top goalscorer: League: Derek Grierson (17); All: Willie Paton (22)
Home colours	Away colours

The 1953–54 season was the 74th season of competitive football by Rangers.

== Overview ==
Rangers played a total of 46 competitive matches during the 1953–54 season.

== Results ==
All results are written with Rangers' score first.

=== Scottish League Division A ===
Date	Opponent	Venue	Result	Attendance	Scorers
5 September 1953	Partick Thistle	H	3–0	60,000	
19 September 1953	Celtic	H	1–1	59,000	
26 September 1953	Stirling Albion	A	0–2	19,500	
17 October 1953	East Fife	H	2–0	40,000	
24 October 1953	Dundee	A	0–1	34,000	
31 October 1953	Heart of Midlothian	H	0–1	30,000	
7 November 1953	Aberdeen	A	1–1	25,000	
14 November 1953	Hamilton Academical	H	8–1	25,000	
21 November 1953	Raith Rovers	A	2–1	18,000	
28 November 1953	Clyde	H	1–1	40,000	
12 December 1953	Queen of the South	A	1–2	18,500	
19 December 1953	Partick Thistle	A	1–0	20,000	
26 December 1953	Hibernian	H	3–0	28,000	
1 January 1954	Celtic	A	0–1	65,000	
2 January 1954	Stirling Albion	H	3–1	28,000	
9 January 1954	St Mirren	A	1–0	37,500	
16 January 1954	Airdrieonians	H	3–0	19,000	
23 January 1954	East Fife	A	1–2	16,000	
6 February 1954	Dundee	H	2–0	38,000	
20 February 1954	Heart of Midlothian	A	3–3	49,000	
6 March 1954	Hamilton Academical	A	1–1	16,500	
17 March 1954	Raith Rovers	H	2–2	9,000	
20 March 1954	Clyde	A	5–2	8,000	
27 March 1954	Falkirk	A	3–4	16,000	
3 April 1954	Queen of the South	H	2–0	14,500	
14 April 1954	St Mirren	H	1–1	12,000	
17 April 1954	Aberdeen	H	1–3	34,000	
21 April 1954	Falkirk	H	3–0	22,000	
24 April 1954	Airdrieonians	A	0–2	8,000	
26 April 1954	Hibernian	A	2–2	17,300	

=== Scottish Cup ===
Date	Round	Opponent	Venue	Result	Attendance	Scorers
30 January 1954	R1	Queen's Park	H	2–0	34,133	
13 February 1954	R2	Kilmarnock	H	2–2	40,000	
17 February 1954	R2 R	Kilmarnock	A	3–1	33,545	
27 February 1954	R3	Third Lanark	A	0–0	45,591	
3 March 1954	R3 R	Third Lanark	H	4–4	17,000	
8 March 1954	R3 2R	Third Lanark	A	3–2	31,000	
13 March 1954	R4	Berwick Rangers	H	4–0	60,245	
10 April 1954	SF	Aberdeen	N	0–6	110,892	

=== League Cup ===
Date	Round	Opponent	Venue	Result	Attendance	Scorers
8 August 1953	SR	Raith Rovers	A	4–0	24,807	
12 August 1953	SR	Heart of Midlothian	H	4–1	60,000	
15 August 1953	SR	Hamilton Academical	H	5–1	35,000	
22 August 1953	SR	Raith Rovers	H	3–1	38,000	
26 August 1953	SR	Heart of Midlothian	A	1–1	33,874	
29 August 1953	SR	Hamilton Academical	A	5–0	17,000	
12 September 1953	QF L1	Ayr United	H	4–2	30,000	
16 September 1953	QF L2	Ayr United	A	2–3	20,000	
10 October 1953	SF	Partick Thistle	N	0–2	48,090	

== See also ==
- 1953–54 in Scottish football
- 1953–54 Scottish Cup
- 1953–54 Scottish League Cup
