= 1952–53 Rangers F.C. season =

Rangers
1952–53 season
- Chairman: John Wilson
- Manager: Bill Struth
- Ground: Ibrox Park
- Scottish League Division One: 1st P30 W18 D7 L5 F80 A39 Pts53
- Scottish Cup: Winners
- League Cup: Semi-finals
- Coronation Cup: First round
- Top goalscorer: League: Derek Grierson (23); All: Derek Grierson (31)
| Home colours | Away colours |

The 1952–53 season was the 73rd season of competitive football by Rangers.

== Overview ==
Rangers played a total of 46 competitive matches during the 1952–53 season.

== Results ==
All results are written with Rangers' score first.

=== Scottish League Division A ===
| Date | Opponent | Venue | Result | Attendance | Scorers |
|---|---|---|---|---|---|
| 6 September 1952 | St Mirren | A | 3–2 | 45,000 | |
| 20 September 1952 | Celtic | A | 1–2 | 48,000 | |
| 27 September 1952 | Third Lanark | H | 4–1 | 25,000 | |
| 11 October 1952 | Hibernian | H | 1–2 | 65,000 | |
| 18 October 1952 | East Fife | A | 2–3 | 20,000 | |
| 1 November 1952 | Queen of the South | H | 3–1 | 20,000 | |
| 8 November 1952 | Falkirk | A | 2–1 | 18,500 | |
| 15 November 1952 | Clyde | A | 6–4 | 28,000 | |
| 22 November 1952 | Raith Rovers | H | 3–2 | 30,000 | |
| 6 December 1952 | Aberdeen | H | 4–0 | 35,000 | |
| 13 December 1952 | Heart of Midlothian | A | 2–2 | 26,100 | |
| 20 December 1952 | St Mirren | H | 4–0 | 35,000 | |
| 27 December 1952 | Airdrieonians | A | 2–2 | 20,000 | |
| 1 January 1953 | Celtic | H | 1–0 | 73,000 | |
| 3 January 1953 | Third Lanark | A | 2–0 | 20,581 | |
| 10 January 1953 | Partick Thistle | H | 2–2 | 30,000 | |
| 17 January 1953 | Hibernian | A | 1–1 | 60,500 | |
| 31 January 1953 | East Fife | H | 4–0 | 52,000 | |
| 14 February 1953 | Dundee | A | 1–1 | 24,000 | |
| 28 February 1953 | Falkirk | H | 4–0 | 35,000 | |
| 7 March 1953 | Clyde | H | 1–2 | 55,000 | |
| 18 March 1953 | Raith Rovers | A | 1–3 | 18,000 | |
| 21 March 1953 | Motherwell | H | 4–1 | 35,000 | |
| 28 March 1953 | Aberdeen | A | 2–2 | 28,000 | |
| 6 April 1953 | Heart of Midlothian | H | 3–0 | 40,000 | |
| 11 April 1953 | Partick Thistle | A | 2–1 | 25,500 | |
| 15 April 1953 | Airdrieonians | H | 8–2 | 20,000 | |
| 20 April 1953 | Motherwell | A | 3–0 | 30,720 | |
| 2 May 1953 | Dundee | H | 3–1 | 60,000 | |
| 7 May 1953 | Queen of the South | A | 1–1 | 17,000 | |

=== Scottish Cup ===
| Date | Round | Opponent | Venue | Result | Attendance | Scorers |
|---|---|---|---|---|---|---|
| 24 January 1953 | R1 | Arbroath | H | 4–0 | 44,000 | |
| 7 February 1953 | R2 | Dundee | A | 2–0 | 43,024 | |
| 21 February 1953 | R3 | Morton | A | 4–1 | 22,000 | |
| 14 March 1953 | R4 | Celtic | H | 2–0 | 95,000 | |
| 4 April 1953 | SF | Heart of Midlothian | N | 2–1 | 116,475 | |
| 25 April 1953 | R4 | Aberdeen | N | 1–1 | 129,876 | |
| 29 April 1953 | SF | Aberdeen | N | 1–0 | 112,799 | |

=== League Cup ===
| Date | Round | Opponent | Venue | Result | Attendance | Scorers |
|---|---|---|---|---|---|---|
| 9 August 1952 | SR | Heart of Midlothian | A | 0–5 | 41,533 | |
| 13 August 1952 | SR | Motherwell | H | 2–0 | 50,000 | |
| 16 August 1952 | SR | Aberdeen | H | 3–1 | 40,000 | |
| 23 August 1952 | SR | Heart of Midlothian | H | 2–0 | 75,000 | |
| 27 August 1952 | SR | Motherwell | A | 3–3 | 35,000 | |
| 30 August 1952 | SR | Aberdeen | A | 2–1 | 35,000 | |
| 13 September 1952 | QF L1 | Third Lanark | H | 0–0 | 50,000 | |
| 17 September 1952 | QF L2 | Third Lanark | A | 2–0 | 42,000 | |
| 4 October 1952 | SF | Kilmarnock | N | 0–1 | 45,815 | |

=== Coronation Cup ===
| Date | Round | Opponent | Venue | Result | Attendance | Scorers |
|---|---|---|---|---|---|---|
| 13 May 1953 | QF | Manchester United | A | 1–2 | | |

== See also ==
- 1952–53 in Scottish football
- 1952–53 Scottish Cup
- 1952–53 Scottish League Cup
- Coronation Cup
