= 1947–48 Rangers F.C. season =

Rangers
1947–48 season
- Chairman: John F. Wilson
- Manager: Bill Struth
- Ground: Ibrox Park
- Scottish League Division One: 2nd P30 W21 D4 L5 F64 A28 Pts48
- Scottish Cup: Winners
- League Cup: Semi-finals
- Top goalscorer: League: Willie Thornton (17); All: Willie Thornton (22)

The 1947–48 season was the 68th season of competitive football by Rangers.

== Overview ==
Rangers played a total of 45 competitive matches during the 1947–48 season. This was the second official season played since the end of the Second World War. The club played in the Scottish League Division A and finished Runner-up to Hibernian, with 46 points.

The club were knocked out of the League Cup by Falkirk 1–0 at the Semi-Final stage.

The Scottish Cup campaign ended in success as the club beat Morton 1–0 in a replay in front of a crowd of 129,176 (a record for a midweek match). Williamson scored the winner in extra time.

Benfica were beaten 3–0 in a prestigious friendly match in Portugal.

== Transfers ==
18 December 1947: Willie Dougal to Preston North End.

== Results ==
All results are written with Rangers' score first.

=== Scottish League Division A ===
Date	Opponent	Venue	Result	Attendance	Scorers
13 August 1947	Third Lanark	H	5-2		Thornton (3), Williamson, Waddell
27 August 1947	Partick Thistle	A	1-0	35,000	Thornton
20 September 1947	Celtic	H	2-0	50,000	Williamson, Findlay
18 October 1947	Hibernian	H	2-1	55,000	Paton, Williamson
25 October 1947	St Mirren	A	1-2	24,000	Thornton
1 November 1947	Airdrieonians	H	3-0	15,000	Thornton, Shaw (pen), Marshall
8 November 1947	Queen of the South	A	3-0	21,000	Findlay (2), Marshall
15 November 1947	Clyde	A	2-1	30,000	Thornton, Marshall
22 November 1947	Morton	H	1-1	25,000	Duncanson
29 November 1947	Queen's Park	A	4-1	28,000	Gillick (2), Parlane, Duncanson
6 December 1947	Hearts	A	2-1	35,750	Duncanson, Rutherford
13 December 1947	Aberdeen	H	4-0	30,000	Gillick (2), Rutherford, Thornton
20 December 1947	Third Lanark	A	1-0	20,000	Gillick
25 December 1947	Dundee	A	3-1	25,000	Duncanson (3)
27 December 1947	Partick Thistle	H	2-1	20,000	Rutherford, Gillick
2 January 1948	Celtic	A	4-0	60,000	McColl, Thornton, Rutherford, Duncanson
3 January 1948	Dundee	H	2-1	35,000	Thornton (2)
10 January 1948	Falkirk	A	5-1	22,000	Gillick (2), Duncanson (2), Waddell
17 January 1948	Motherwell	H	2-0	35,000	Thornton, Young
31 January 1948	Hibernian	A	0-1	52,570	
14 February 1948	St Mirren	H	3-2	20,000	Thornton (3)
28 February 1948	Queen of the South	H	2-3	34,000	Gillick, Thornton
13 March 1948	Morton	A	1-0	18,000	Thornton
20 March 1948	Queen's Park	H	1-2	37,000	Rutherford
29 March 1948	Falkirk	H	1-1		Duncanson
2 April 1948	Aberdeen	A	1-1	43,800	Duncanson
24 April 1948	Motherwell	A	1-1	25,000	Duncanson
26 April 1948	Clyde	H	2-1		McPherson, Cox
1 May 1948	Airdrieonians	A	2-1	18,000	Findlay (2)
3 May 1948	Hearts	H	1-2	10,000	Findlay

=== Scottish Cup ===
Date	Round	Opponent	Venue	Result	Attendance	Scorers
24 January 1948	R1	Stranraer	A	1–0	6,000	Thornton
7 February 1948	R2	Leith Athletic	H	4–0	17,000	Thornton, Waddell, Cox, Rutherford
21 February 1948	R3	Partick Thistle	H	3–0	68,000	Young (pen), Duncanson, McGownan (og)
6 March 1948	QF	East Fife	H	1–0	90,000	Duncanson
27 March 1948	SF	Hibernian	N	1–0	143,570	Thornton
17 April 1948	F	Morton	N	1–1	131,975	Gillick
21 April 1948	F R	Morton	N	1–0	133,750	Williamson

=== League Cup ===
Date	Round	Opponent	Venue	Result	Attendance	Scorers
9 August 1947	SR	Celtic	H	2–0	80,000	Williamson (2)
16 August 1947	SR	Third Lanark	A	3–1	25,000	Williamson (2), Duncanson
23 August 1947	SR	Dundee	H	3–0	25,000	Williamson, Gillick, Thornton
30 August 1947	SR	Celtic	A	0–2	60,000	
6 September 1947	SR	Third Lanark	H	3–0	20,000	Findlay (2), Gillick
13 September 1947	SR	Dundee	A	1–1	39,000	Paton
27 September 1947	QF	Stenhousemuir	H	2–0	25,000	Findlay, Thornton
11 October 1947	SF	Falkirk	N	0–1	44,432	

== Appearances ==
Player	Position	Appearances	Goals
(Scotland) Bobby Brown	GK	45	0
(Scotland) Sammy Cox	DF	45	2
(Scotland) Jock Shaw	DF	43	1
(Scotland) Ian McColl	DF	43	1
(Scotland) Willie Woodburn	DF	37	0
(Scotland) Willie Rae	MF	24	0
(Scotland) William Waddell	MF	22	3
(Scotland) Torrance Gillick	MF	35	12
(Scotland) Billy Williamson	FW	12	9
(Scotland) Willie Thornton	FW	45	22
(Scotland) Jimmy Duncanson	FW	44	15
(Scotland) George Young	DF	26	2
(Scotland) Willie Findlay	FW	12	9
(Scotland) Willie Paton	MF	5	2
(Scotland) Eddie Rutherford	MF	27	6
(Scotland) Dave Marshall	FW	4	3
(Scotland) Jimmy Parlane	FW	1	1
(Scotland) Jimmy Caskie	MF	15	0
(Scotland) John Lindsay	DF	3	0
(Scotland) Adam Little	MF	1	0
(Scotland) Charlie Watkins	MF	4	0
(Scotland) Joe Johnson	FW	1	0
(Scotland) John McPherson	FW	1	1

== See also ==
- 1947–48 in Scottish football
- 1947–48 Scottish Cup
- 1947–48 Scottish League Cup
