= 1887–88 Rangers F.C. season =

Rangers
1887–88 season
- President: James Watson
- Match Secretary: James Gossland
- Ground: Ibrox Park
- Scottish Cup: Second round

The 1887–88 season was the 14th season of competitive football by Rangers.

== Overview ==
Rangers played a total of 2 competitive matches during the 1887–88 season.

== Results ==
All results are written with Rangers' score first.

=== Scottish Cup ===
Date	Round	Opponent	Venue	Result	Attendance	Scorers
3 September 1887	R1	Battlefield	H	4–1	3,500	
24 September 1887	R2	Partick Thistle	A	1–2		

== See also ==
- 1887–88 in Scottish football
- 1887–88 Scottish Cup
