= Joe Johnson (footballer, born 1920) =

Scottish footballer

Personal information
- Full name: Joseph Robert Johnson
- Date of birth: 13 September 1920
- Place of birth: Greenock, Scotland
- Date of death: 1 September 2005 (aged 84)
- Place of death: Vancouver, British Columbia, Canada
- Position: Inside forward

Senior career*
Years	Team	Apps	(Gls)
1947–1952	Rangers	32	(7)
1950–1951	→ Falkirk (loan)	20	(4)
1952–1953	Lincoln City	11	(2)
1953–1954	Workington	38	(5)
1954	Elgin City		
- * Club domestic league appearances and goals

Joseph Robert Johnson (13 September 1920 – 1 September 2005) was a Scottish professional football player who is best known for his time with Rangers.

Born in Greenock, Johnson began his career at Arthurlie before joining Rangers in 1947. He stayed with the club for five years making sporadic appearances and going on loan to Falkirk in 1950. He then moved to England and had season long spells with Lincoln City and Workington. Upon returning to Scotland, Johnson joined Elgin City, who at that time were not in the Scottish Football League. He died on 31 May 1988 in Vancouver, BC, Canada.
