= 1881–82 Rangers F.C. season =

Rangers
1881–82 season
- President: James Watson
- Match Secretary: John Wallace MacKay
- Ground: Kinning Park
- Scottish Cup: Second round

The 1881–82 season was the eighth season of competitive football by Rangers.

== Overview ==
Rangers played a total of 8 competitive matches during the 1881–82 season.

== Results ==
All results are written with Rangers' score first.

=== Scottish Cup ===
Date	Round	Opponent	Venue	Result	Attendance	Scorers
10 September 1881	R1	Third Lanark	H	2–1	3,000	
24 September 1881	R2	Harmonic	H	w/o		
22 October 1881	R3	Alexandra Athletic	H	3–1	3,000	
12 November 1881	R4	Thorneliebank	A	2–0	2,000	
3 December 1881	R5	South Western	A	2–1	3,000	Replay ordered
24 December 1881	R5 R	South Western	H	4–0	1,000	
28 January 1882	R6	Dumbarton	A	1–2	5,000	Replay ordered
4 February 1882	R6 R	Dumbarton	A	1–5		

== See also ==
- 1881–82 in Scottish football
- 1881–82 Scottish Cup
