= 1960–61 Rangers F.C. season =

Rangers
1960–61 season
- Chairman: John Wilson
- Manager: Scot Symon
- Ground: Ibrox Park
- Scottish League Division One: 1st P34 W23 D5 L8 F88 A46 Pts51
- Scottish Cup: Third round
- League Cup: Winners
- European Cup Winners' Cup: Runners-up
- Top goalscorer: League: All: Ralph Brand (40)

The 1960–61 season was the 81st season of competitive football by Rangers.

Rangers won the Scottish League Cup.

== Overview ==
Rangers played a total of 65 competitive matches during the 1960–61 season.

== Results ==
All results are written with Rangers' score first.

=== Scottish First Division ===
Date	Opponent	Venue	Result	Attendance	Scorers
24 August 1960	Partick Thistle	H	6–3	22,693	
10 September 1960	Celtic	A	5–1	29,789	
17 September 1960	Airdrieonians	H	3–0	76,198	
24 September 1960	St Johnstone	A	5–2	21,451	
1 October 1960	Third Lanark	A	4–2	15,599	
8 October 1960	Dundee	H	0–1	22,160	
15 October 1960	Dunfermline Athletic	H	3–1	37,288	
26 October 1960	Heart of Midlothian	A	3–1	19,046	
2 November 1960	Raith Rovers	H	3–0	10,503	
5 November 1960	Clyde	A	3–1	20,189	
12 November 1960	Dundee United	H	4–0	28,697	
26 November 1960	Kilmarnock	H	2–3	33,225	
3 December 1960	Aberdeen	H	4–0	15,409	
10 December 1960	Hibernian	A	2–1	22,204	
17 December 1960	St Mirren	H	5–1	13,212	
24 December 1960	Ayr United	A	0–1	31,003	
26 December 1960	Motherwell	A	2–1	19,783	
31 December 1960	Partick Thistle	A	3–0	58,445	
2 January 1961	Celtic	H	2–1	79,278	
7 January 1961	Airdrieonians	A	1–1	14,935	
14 January 1961	St Johnstone	H	1–0	18,870	
21 January 1961	Third Lanark	H	4–3	27,569	
28 January 1961	St Mirren	A	1–1	17,305	
8 February 1961	Dundee	A	2–4	8,706	
18 February 1961	Dunfermline Athletic	A	0–0	38,571	
4 March 1961	Raith Rovers	A	3–2	25,372	
8 March 1961	Heart of Midlothian	H	3–0	14,815	
11 March 1961	Clyde	H	2–1	12,421	
18 March 1961	Dundee United	H	1–1	19,535	
25 March 1961	Motherwell	H	2–2	16,387	
1 April 1961	Kilmarnock	A	0–2	13,927	
8 April 1961	Aberdeen	A	1–6	11,175	
11 April 1961	Hibernian	H	1–0	19,817	
29 April 1961	Ayr United	H	7–3	10,606	

=== Scottish Cup ===
Date	Round	Opponent	Venue	Result	Attendance	Scorers
11 February 1961	R2	Dundee	A	5–1	32,000	
25 February 1961	R3	Motherwell	A	2–2	31,958	
1 March 1961	R3 R	Motherwell	H	2–5	85,000	

=== League Cup ===
Date	Round	Opponent	Venue	Result	Attendance	Scorers
13 August 1960	SR	Partick Thistle	H	3–1	51,000	
17 August 1960	SR	Third Lanark	A	1–2	35,000	
20 August 1960	SR	Celtic	H	2–3	60,000	
27 August 1960	SR	Partick Thistle	A	4–1	35,000	
31 August 1960	SR	Third Lanark	H	3–2	40,000	
3 September 1960	SR	Celtic	A	2–1	60,000	
14 September 1960	QF1	Dundee	H	1–0	45,000	
21 September 1960	QF2	Dundee	A	4–3	32,000	
19 October 1960	SF	Queen of the South	N	7–0	17,000	
29 October 1960	F	Kilmarnock	N	2–0	82,063	

=== European Cup Winners' Cup ===
Date	Round	Opponent	Venue	Result	Attendance	Scorers
28 September 1960	QRL1	Ferencvaros	H	4–2	36,024	
12 October 1960	QRL2	Ferencvaros	A	1–2	25,000	
15 November 1960	QFL1	Borussia Monchengladbach	A	3–0	50,000	
30 November 1960	QFL2	Borussia Monchengladbach	H	8–0	38,174	
29 March 1961	SFL1	Wolverhampton Wanderers	H	2–0	79,229	
19 April 1961	SFL2	Wolverhampton Wanderers	A	1–1	45,163	
17 May 1961	FL1	Fiorentina	H	0–2	80,000	
27 May 1961	FL2	Fiorentina	A	2–1	50,000	

== See also ==
- 1960–61 in Scottish football
- 1960–61 Scottish Cup
- 1960–61 Scottish League Cup
- 1960–61 European Cup Winners' Cup
