= 1932–33 Rangers F.C. season =

Rangers
1932–33 season
- Chairman: Joseph Buchanan (until October); Duncan Graham (from October)
- Manager: Bill Struth
- Ground: Ibrox Park
- Scottish League Division One: 1st P38 W26 D10 L2 F113 A43 Pts62
- Scottish Cup: Third round

The 1932–33 season was the 59th season of competitive football by Rangers.

== Results ==
All results are written with Rangers' score first.

=== Scottish League Division One ===
Date	Opponent	Venue	Result	Attendance	Scorers
13 August 1932	St Mirren	A	0–2	25,000	
17 August 1932	Morton	A	3–1	16,000	
20 August 1932	Ayr United	H	4–1	17,000	
23 August 1932	Clyde	H	2–2	8,000	
27 August 1932	Airdrieonians	A	2–1	12,000	
31 August 1932	Third Lanark	H	5–0	15,000	
3 September 1932	East Stirlingshire	H	4–0	10,000	
10 September 1932	Celtic	A	1–1	60,000	
17 September 1932	Partick Thistle	H	3–0	13,000	
24 September 1932	Cowdenbeath	A	3–2	6,000	
1 October 1932	Motherwell	H	2–2	55,000	
8 October 1932	Dundee	A	3–0	6,000	
22 October 1932	Heart of Midlothian	A	0–1	24,342	
29 October 1932	Kilmarnock	H	2–0	6,000	
5 November 1932	Clyde	A	5–0	16,000	
12 November 1932	Morton	H	6–1	15,000	
19 November 1932	St Johnstone	H	3–0	15,000	
26 November 1932	Falkirk	A	4–1	12,000	
3 December 1932	Aberdeen	H	3–1	20,000	
10 December 1932	Queen's Park	A	0–0	16,000	
17 December 1932	Hamilton Academical	H	4–4	7,000	
24 December 1932	St Mirren	H	4–0	12,000	
31 December 1933	Ayr United	A	3–3	9,000	
2 January 1933	Celtic	H	0–0	42,000	
3 January 1933	Partick Thistle	A	0–0	40,000	
7 January 1933	Airdrieonians	H	5–1	7,000	
14 January 1933	East Stirlingshire	A	3–2	6,000	
28 January 1933	Cowdenbeath	H	4–1	6,000	
11 February 1933	Motherwell	A	3–1	27,000	
25 February 1933	Dundee	H	6–4	6,000	
4 March 1933	Third Lanark	A	3–1	15,000	
11 March 1933	Heart of Midlothian	H	4–4	28,000	
18 March 1933	Kilmarnock	A	6–2	7,000	
25 March 1933	St Johnstone	A	2–0	9,000	
8 April 1933	Falkirk	H	5–1	12,000	
15 April 1933	Aberdeen	A	1–1	18,000	
22 April 1933	Queen's Park	H	1–0	22,000	
29 April 1933	Hamilton Academical	A	4–2	4,000	

=== Scottish Cup ===
Date	Round	Opponent	Venue	Result	Attendance	Scorers
23 January 1933	R1	Arbroath	H	3–1	5,000	
4 February 1933	R2	Queen's Park	H	1–1	30,006	
8 February 1933	R2 R	Queen's Park	A	1–1	31,805	
13 February 1933	R3 R	Queen's Park	A	3–1	45,217	
18 February 1933	R4	Kilmarnock	A	0–1	32,745	

== See also ==
- 1932–33 in Scottish football
- 1932–33 Scottish Cup
