= 1926–27 Rangers F.C. season =

Rangers
1926–27 season
- Chairman: Joseph Buchanan
- Manager: Bill Struth
- Ground: Ibrox Park
- Scottish League Division One: 1st P38 W23 D10 L5 F85 A41 Pts56
- Scottish Cup: Fourth round

The 1926–27 season was the 53rd season of competitive football by Rangers.

== Results ==
All results are written with Rangers' score first.

=== Scottish League Division One ===
Date	Opponent	Venue	Result	Attendance	Scorers
14 August 1926	Dundee United	H	2–0	20,000	
17 August 1926	Dunfermline Athletic	H	2–0	16,000	
21 August 1926	Airdrieonians	A	3–3	15,000	
28 August 1926	Partick Thistle	H	2–1	22,000	
4 September 1926	St Johnstone	A	1–2	5,000	
11 September 1926	Motherwell	H	2–0	18,000	
18 September 1926	Heart of Midlothian	A	2–0	32,000	
25 September 1926	Aberdeen	H	3–2	23,000	
2 October 1926	St Mirren	A	7–3	34,000	
16 October 1926	Queen's Park	H	0–1	19,000	
23 October 1926	Morton	A	8–2	4,000	
6 November 1926	Cowdenbeath	H	4–1	10,000	
13 November 1926	Hibernian	A	2–2	18,000	
20 November 1926	Falkirk	H	2–1	20,000	
27 November 1926	Clyde	H	6–0	10,000	
4 December 1926	Hamilton Academical	H	1–4	10,000	
11 December 1926	Dundee	A	1–1	18,000	
18 December 1926	Kilmarnock	A	0–0	12,000	
25 December 1926	Dundee United	A	0–2	15,000	
1 January 1927	Celtic	H	2–1	63,000	
3 January 1927	Partick Thistle	A	4–1	40,000	
8 January 1927	St Johnstone	H	4–2	8,000	
15 January 1927	Motherwell	A	4–1	32,000	
29 January 1927	Heart of Midlothian	H	1–0	15,000	
12 February 1927	St Mirren	H	4–0	20,000	
16 February 1927	Aberdeen	A	2–2	16,000	
23 February 1927	Dunfermline Athletic	A	3–1	8,000	
1 March 1927	Queen's Park	A	2–1	18,000	
12 March 1927	Airdrieonians	H	1–1	27,000	
16 March 1927	Morton	H	2–1	8,000	
23 March 1927	Cowdenbeath	A	0–1	3,000	
29 March 1927	Hibernian	H	2–0	5,000	
2 April 1927	Falkirk	A	3–3	6,000	
9 April 1927	Clyde	A	0–0	20,000	
16 April 1927	Hamilton Academical	A	1–1	10,000	
18 April 1927	Celtic	A	1–0	35,000	
23 April 1927	Dundee	H	0–0	12,000	
30 April 1927	Kilmarnock	H	1–0	8,000	

=== Scottish Cup ===
Date	Round	Opponent	Venue	Result	Attendance	Scorers
22 January 1927	R1	Leith Athletic	A	4–1	14,130	
5 February 1927	R2	St Mirren	H	6–0	53,000	
19 February 1927	R3	Hamilton Academical	H	4–0	53,000	
5 March 1927	R4	Falkirk	A	2–2	20,233	
9 March 1927	R4 R	Falkirk	H	0–1	80,000	

== See also ==
- 1926–27 in Scottish football
- 1926–27 Scottish Cup
