= 1951–52 Rangers F.C. season =

Rangers
1950–51 season
- Chairman: John Wilson
- Manager: Bill Struth
- Ground: Ibrox Park
- Scottish League Division One: 2nd P30 W16 D9 L5 F61 A31 Pts41
- Scottish Cup: Quarter-finals
- League Cup: Runners-up
- St Mungo Cup: Round 1
- Top goalscorer: League: Billy Simpson (18); All: Willie Thornton (27)
Home colours	Away colours

The 1951–52 season was the 72nd season of competitive football by Rangers.

== Overview ==
Rangers played a total of 45 competitive matches during the 1951–52 season.

== Results ==
All results are written with Rangers' score first.

=== Scottish League Division A ===
Date	Opponent	Venue	Result	Attendance	Scorers
8 September 1951	Partick Thistle	H	4–1	45,000	
22 September 1951	Celtic	H	1–1	86,000	
29 September 1951	Dundee	A	0–1	31,000	
10 October 1951	East Fife	H	1–1	20,000	
20 October 1951	Heart of Midlothian	H	2–0	35,000	
3 November 1951	Hibernian	A	1–1	55,000	
10 November 1951	St Mirren	H	5–1	18,500	
17 November 1951	Raith Rovers	A	1–3	21,000	
24 November 1951	Stirling Albion	H	3–0	20,000	
1 December 1951	Third Lanark	H	1–1	17,000	
8 December 1951	Morton	A	1–0	14,000	
15 December 1951	Motherwell	H	3–0	40,000	
22 December 1951	Partick Thistle	A	3–1	35,000	
29 December 1951	Queen of the South	H	3–2	30,000	
1 January 1952	Celtic	A	4–1	45,000	
2 January 1952	Dundee	H	1–2	35,000	
5 January 1952	East Fife	A	1–2	18,000	
12 January 1952	Airdrieonians	H	1–0	35,000	
19 January 1952	Heart of Midlothian	A	2–2	47,684	
26 January 1952	St Mirren	A	5–0	32,000	
2 February 1952	Aberdeen	H	3–2	35,000	
13 February 1952	Hibernian	H	2–2	45,000	
16 February 1952	Airdrieonians	A	1–0	24,000	
27 February 1952	Raith Rovers	H	1–0	20,000	
1 March 1952	Stirling Albion	A	5–1	14,000	
15 March 1952	Morton	H	1–0	35,000	
22 March 1952	Motherwell	A	1–2	22,000	
29 March 1952	Queen of the South	A	2–2	12,000	
16 April 1952	Third Lanark	A	1–1	15,000	
19 April 1952	Aberdeen	A	1–1	20,000	

=== Scottish Cup ===
Date	Round	Opponent	Venue	Result	Attendance	Scorers
9 February 1952	R2	Elgin City	H	6–1	36,324	
23 February 1952	R3	Arbroath	A	2–0	13,510	
8 March 1952	QF	Motherwell	H	1–1	95,000	
12 March 1952	QF Replay	Motherwell	A	1–2	26,475	

=== League Cup ===
Date	Round	Opponent	Venue	Result	Attendance	Scorers
11 August 1951	SR	East Fife	A	0–0	18,500	
15 August 1951	SR	Aberdeen	H	2–1	60,000	
18 August 1951	SR	Queen of the South	A	3–0	19,000	
25 August 1951	SR	East Fife	H	4–1	28,000	
29 August 1951	SR	Aberdeen	A	1–2	28,000	
1 September 1951	SR	Queen of the South	H	5–2	40,000	
15 September 1951	QF L1	Dunfermline Athletic	A	0–1	20,000	
19 September 1951	QF L2	Dunfermline Athletic	H	3–1	45,000	
13 October 1951	SF	Celtic	N	3–0	82,050	
27 October 1951	F	Dundee	N	2–3	91,217	

=== St Mungo Cup ===
Date	Round	Opponent	Venue	Result	Attendance	Scorers
14 July 1951	SF	Aberdeen	A	1–2	30,000	Findlay

== See also ==
- 1951–52 in Scottish football
- 1951–52 Scottish Cup
- 1951–52 Scottish League Cup
