= 1954–55 Rangers F.C. season =

Rangers
1954–55 season
- Manager: Scot Symon
- Ground: Ibrox Park
- Scottish League Division A: 3rd P30 W19 D3 L8 F67 A33 Pts41
- Scottish Cup: Quarter-finals
- League Cup: Semi-finals
- Top goalscorer: League: All: Ralph Brand (40)

The 1954–55 season was the 75th season of competitive football by Rangers.

== Overview ==
Rangers played a total of 41 competitive matches during the 1954–55 season.

== Results ==
All results are written with Rangers' score first.

=== Scottish League Division A ===
Date	Opponent	Venue	Result	Attendance	Scorers
11 September 1954	Hibernian	H	1–1	54,000	
18 September 1954	Celtic	A	0–2	45,000	
2 October 1954	East Fife	A	7–2	16,500	
9 October 1954	Stirling Albion	H	3–1	20,000	
16 October 1954	Partick Thistle	A	5–2	35,741	
23 October 1954	Dundee	H	3–0	30,000	
30 October 1954	St Mirren	A	1–2	35,054	
6 November 1954	Kilmarnock	H	6–0	40,000	
13 November 1954	Falkirk	A	3–0	20,000	
20 November 1954	Clyde	A	1–1	32,000	
27 November 1954	Raith Rovers	H	4–0	26,000	
4 December 1954	Queen of the South	A	2–1	12,500	
11 December 1954	Aberdeen	H	3–1	45,800	
18 December 1954	Heart of Midlothian	A	4–3	35,000	
25 December 1954	Hibernian	A	1–2	43,000	
1 January 1955	Celtic	H	4–1	63,000	
3 January 1955	Motherwell	A	0–2	25,000	
8 January 1955	East Fife	H	2–0	28,000	
29 January 1955	Dundee	A	1–2	28,000	
12 February 1955	St Mirren	H	1–1	40,000	
26 February 1955	Kilmarnock	A	0–1	24,201	
5 March 1955	Stirling Albion	A	2–0	9,000	
9 March 1955	Falkirk	H	4–1	8,000	
12 March 1955	Clyde	H	1–0	55,000	
19 March 1955	Raith Rovers	A	0–1	14,500	
26 March 1955	Queen of the South	H	1–0	15,000	
2 April 1955	Aberdeen	A	0–4	32,500	
9 April 1955	Heart of Midlothian	H	2–1	30,000	
11 April 1955	Partick Thistle	H	3–1	28,000	
30 April 1955	Motherwell	H	2–0	30,000	

=== Scottish Cup ===
Date	Round	Opponent	Venue	Result	Attendance	Scorers
5 February 1955	R5	Dundee	H	0–0	58,000	
9 February 1955	R5 R	Dundee	A	1–0	25,600	
19 February 1955	R6	Aberdeen	A	1–2	44,647	

=== League Cup ===
Date	Round	Opponent	Venue	Result	Attendance	Scorers
14 August 1954	SR	Stirling Albion	A	5–0	24,000	
18 August 1954	SR	Partick Thistle	H	1–1	27,000	
21 August 1954	SR	Clyde	H	1–3	45,000	
28 August 1954	SR	Stirling Albion	H	2–0	30,000	
1 September 1954	SR	Partick Thistle	A	2–1	26,883	
4 September 1954	SR	Clyde	A	2–1	32,700	
22 September 1954	QF L1	Motherwell	A	1–2	24,000	
25 September 1954	QF L2	Motherwell	H	1–1	47,000	

== See also ==
- 1954–55 in Scottish football
- 1954–55 Scottish Cup
- 1954–55 Scottish League Cup
