= 1950–51 Rangers F.C. season =

Rangers
1950–51 season
- Chairman: John F. Wilson
- Manager: Bill Struth
- Ground: Ibrox Park
- Scottish League Division One: 2nd P30 W17 D4 L9 F64 A37 Pts38
- Scottish Cup: Second round
- League Cup: Sectional round
- Top goalscorer: League: Billy Simpson (13); All: Willie Thornton (19)
Home colours	Away colours

The 1950–51 season was the 71st season of competitive football by Rangers.

== Overview ==
Rangers played a total of 38 competitive matches during the 1950–51 season.

== Results ==
All results are written with Rangers' score first.

=== Scottish League Division A ===
Date	Opponent	Venue	Result	Attendance	Scorers
9 September 1950	East Fife	A	3–0	20,600	
16 September 1950	Dundee	H	0–0	40,000	
23 September 1950	Celtic	A	2–3	53,789	
30 September 1950	Airdrieonians	H	4–1	20,000	
7 October 1950	Partick Thistle	A	1–2	33,000	
14 October 1950	Third Lanark	H	2–1	35,000	
28 October 1950	Aberdeen	H	1–2	50,000	
4 November 1950	Hibernian	H	1–1	80,000	
11 November 1950	St Mirren	A	2–0	20,000	
18 November 1950	Raith Rovers	H	4–1	25,000	
25 November 1950	Falkirk	A	1–1	20,000	
2 December 1950	Clyde	A	1–2	22,000	
9 December 1950	Morton	H	2–0	30,000	
23 December 1950	East Fife	H	5–0	25,000	
30 December 1950	Dundee	A	0–2	37,400	
1 January 1951	Celtic	H	1–0	55,000	
6 January 1951	Partick Thistle	H	1–3	35,000	
20 January 1951	Heart of Midlothian	H	2–1	54,000	
3 February 1951	Aberdeen	A	4–2	42,000	
17 February 1951	St Mirren	H	1–1	20,000	
24 February 1951	Raith Rovers	A	1–3	24,000	
3 March 1951	Falkirk	H	5–2	20,000	
10 March 1951	Clyde	H	4–0	20,000	
17 March 1951	Morton	A	2–0	22,000	
24 March 1951	Motherwell	H	3–0	30,000	
31 March 1951	Airdrieonians	A	1–2	20,000	
7 April 1951	Motherwell	A	3–2	18,000	
21 April 1951	Heart of Midlothian	A	1–0	38,371	
25 April 1951	Third Lanark	A	5–1	15,000	
28 April 1951	Hibernian	A	1–4	40,000	

=== Scottish Cup ===
Date	Round	Opponent	Venue	Result	Attendance	Scorers
27 January 1951	R2	Queen of the South	H	2–0	40,000	
10 February 1951	R3	Hibernian	H	1–2	102,342	

=== League Cup ===
Date	Round	Opponent	Venue	Result	Attendance	Scorers
12 August 1950	SR	Morton	A	1–2	18,500	
16 August 1950	SR	Aberdeen	H	2–1	40,000	
19 August 1950	SR	Clyde	H	4–0	45,000	
26 August 1950	SR	Morton	H	6–1	35,000	
30 August 1950	SR	Aberdeen	A	0–2	42,000	
2 September 1950	SR	Clyde	A	5–1	28,000	

== See also ==
- 1950–51 in Scottish football
- 1950–51 Scottish Cup
- 1950–51 Scottish League Cup
