= 1880–81 Rangers F.C. season =

Rangers
1880–81 season
- President: James Watson
- Match Secretary: John Wallace MacKay
- Ground: Kinning Park
- Scottish Cup: Second round

The 1880–81 season was the seventh season of competitive football by Rangers.

== Overview ==
Rangers played a total of 6 competitive matches during the 1880–81 season.

== Results ==
All results are written with Rangers' score first.

=== Scottish Cup ===
| Date | Round | Opponent | Venue | Result | Attendance | Scorers |
|---|---|---|---|---|---|---|
| 11 September 1880 | R1 | Govan Athletic | Kinning Park (H) | 4–1 | | |
| 2 October 1880 | R2 | Northern | Hyde Park (A) | 1–0 | 3,000 | |
| 23 October 1880 | R3 | Partick Thistle | H | 3–0 | 1,000 | |
| 13 November 1880 | R4 | Clyde | H | 11–0 | | |
| 18 December 1880 | R5 | Hurlford | A | 3–0 | | |
| 25 December 1880 | R6 | Dumbarton | H | 1–3 | | |

== See also ==
- 1880–81 in Scottish football
- 1880–81 Scottish Cup
