= 1956–57 Rangers F.C. season =

Rangers
1956–57 season
- Manager: Scot Symon
- Ground: Ibrox Park
- Scottish League Division One: 1st P34 W26 D3 L5 F96 A48 Pts55
- Scottish Cup: Quarter-finals
- League Cup: Group stage
- European Cup: 1st round
- Top goalscorer: League: All: Ralph Brand (40)

The 1956–57 season was the 77th season of competitive football by Rangers.

== Overview ==
Rangers played a total of 46 competitive matches during the 1956–57 season.

== Results ==
All results are written with Rangers' score first.

=== Scottish First Division ===
Date	Opponent	Venue	Result	Attendance	Scorers
8 September 1956	Airdrieonians	A	3–3	17,000	
15 September 1956	Kilmarnock	H	0–1	30,000	
22 September 1956	Celtic	A	2–0	53,000	
29 September 1956	Ayr United	H	3–1	27,000	
6 October 1956	St Mirren	A	2–1	28,700	
13 October 1956	Partick Thistle	H	4–1	38,000	
3 November 1956	Hibernian	H	5–3	45,000	
10 November 1956	Motherwell	H	2–3	63,000	
17 November 1956	Falkirk	A	2–0	19,000	
24 November 1956	Aberdeen	H	2–1	29,100	
1 December 1956	East Fife	H	6–1	26,000	
8 December 1956	Raith Rovers	A	1–5	20,000	
15 December 1956	Heart of Midlothian	H	5–3	45,000	
22 December 1956	Kilmarnock	A	2–3	22,456	
29 December 1956	Queen of the South	H	4–0	30,000	
1 January 1957	Celtic	H	2–0	60,000	
2 January 1957	Dundee	A	3–1	28,500	
12 January 1957	Ayr United	A	0–1	15,000	
19 January 1957	St Mirren	H	1–0	33,000	
26 January 1957	Partick Thistle	A	3–0	35,000	
9 February 1957	Dunfermline Athletic	H	2–1	30,000	
23 February 1957	Queen's Park	H	3–3	19,000	
2 March 1957	Hibernian	A	3–2	40,000	
9 March 1957	Motherwell	A	5–2	30,000	
16 March 1957	Falkirk	A	1–1	35,000	
20 March 1957	Dundee	H	4–0	25,000	
23 March 1957	Aberdeen	A	2–1	26,500	
30 March 1957	East Fife	A	3–0	13,000	
2 April 1957	Raith Rovers	H	3–1	50,000	
13 April 1957	Heart of Midlothian	A	1–0	49,000	
17 April 1957	Airdrieonians	H	3–2	25,000	
22 April 1957	Queen's Park	A	6–4	33,786	
27 April 1957	Queen of the South	A	3–0	14,500	
29 April 1957	Dunfermline Athletic	A	4–3	10,000	

=== Scottish Cup ===
Date	Round	Opponent	Venue	Result	Attendance	Scorers
2 February 1957	R5	Heart of Midlothian	A	4–0	47,484	
16 February 1957	R6	Celtic	A	4–4	55,000	
20 February 1957	R6R	Celtic	H	0–2	88,000	

=== League Cup ===
Date	Round	Opponent	Venue	Result	Attendance	Scorers
11 August 1956	SR	East Fife	H	3–0	51,000	
15 August 1956	SR	Celtic	A	1–2	45,000	
18 August 1956	SR	Aberdeen	H	6–2	35,000	
25 August 1956	SR	East Fife	A	4–1	16,000	
29 August 1956	SR	Celtic	H	0–0	84,000	
1 September 1956	SR	Aberdeen	A	4–1	48,000	

=== European Cup ===
Date	Round	Opponent	Venue	Result	Attendance	Scorers
24 October 1956	R1L1	Nice	H	2–1	65,000	
14 November 1956	R1L2	Nice	A	1–2	12,000	
28 November 1956	R1R	Nice	N	1–3	15,000	

== See also ==
- 1956–57 in Scottish football
- 1956–57 Scottish Cup
- 1956–57 Scottish League Cup
- 1956–57 European Cup
