= 1930–31 Rangers F.C. season =

Rangers
1930–31 season
- Chairman: Joseph Buchanan
- Manager: Bill Struth
- Ground: brox Park Stadium
- Scottish League Division One: 1st P38 W27 D6 L5 F96 A29 Pts60
- Scottish Cup: Second round

The 1930–31 season was the 57th season of competitive football by Rangers.

== Results ==
All results are written with Rangers' score first.

=== Scottish League Division One ===
Date	Opponent	Venue	Result	Attendance	Scorers
9 August 1930	Cowdenbeath	A	3–1	12,000	
16 August 1930	Heart of Midlothian	H	4–1	40,000	
23 August 1930	Dundee	A	1–0	22,000	
30 August 1930	Motherwell	H	1–1	40,000	
2 September 1930	Hamilton Academical	H	1–0	30,000	
6 September 1930	St Mirren	A	1–1	20,000	
13 September 1930	Leith Athletic	H	4–1	15,000	
20 September 1930	Celtic	A	0–2	83,500	
27 September 1930	Partick Thistle	H	3–1	25,000	
4 October 1930	Airdrieonians	A	3–3	10,000	
18 October 1930	Kilmarnock	A	0–1	15,000	
1 November 1930	Aberdeen	H	4–0	12,000	
8 November 1930	Falkirk	A	3–1	12,000	
15 November 1930	Queen's Park	A	2–0	25,000	
22 November 1930	Morton	H	7–1	10,000	
29 November 1930	Clyde	H	5–1	10,000	
6 December 1930	Hibernian	A	2–1	20,000	
13 December 1930	East Fife	H	4–0	8,000	
20 December 1930	Cowdenbeath	H	7–0	16,000	
27 December 1930	Heart of Midlothian	A	0–3	37,000	
1 January 1931	Celtic	H	1–0	83,500	
3 January 1931	Dundee	H	3–0	17,000	
10 January 1931	Motherwell	A	0–1	26,000	
24 January 1931	St Mirren	H	1–1	12,000	
7 February 1931	Airdrieonians	H	0–1	14,000	
14 February 1931	Clyde	A	8–0	12,000	
18 February 1931	Ayr United	A	2–2	7,000	
21 February 1931	Kilmarnock	H	1–0	8,000	
28 February 1931	Hamilton Academical	A	3–0	5,000	
7 March 1931	Aberdeen	A	3–1	8,000	
14 March 1931	Leith Athletic	A	3–1	9,000	
18 March 1931	Falkirk	H	1–0	9,000	
1 April 1931	Queen's Park	H	2–0	10,000	
4 April 1931	Morton	A	2–1	12,000	
6 April 1931	Ayr United	H	5–1	14,000	
18 April 1931	Hibernian	H	1–0	10,000	
22 April 1931	Partick Thistle	A	1–1	43,400	
25 April 1931	East Fife	A	4–0	6,000	

=== Scottish Cup ===
Date	Round	Opponent	Venue	Result	Attendance	Scorers
17 January 1931	R1	Armadale	A	7–1	5,527	
31 January 1931	R2	Dundee	H	1–2	17,000	

== See also ==
- 1930–31 in Scottish football
- 1930–31 Scottish Cup
