= 1959–60 Rangers F.C. season =

Rangers
1959–60 season
- Chairman: John Wilson
- Manager: Scot Symon
- Ground: Ibrox Park
- Scottish League Division One: 3rd P34 W17 D8 L9 F72 A38 Pts42
- Scottish Cup: Winners
- League Cup: Group stage
- European Cup: Semi-finals
- Top goalscorer: League: All: Ralph Brand (40)

The 1959–60 season was the 80th season of competitive football by Rangers.

Rangers won the Scottish Cup after beating Kilmarnock in the final.

== Overview ==
Rangers played a total of 56 competitive matches during the 1959–60 season.

== Results ==
All results are written with Rangers' score first.

=== Scottish First Division ===
Date	Opponent	Venue	Result	Attendance	Scorers
19 August 1959	Stirling Albion	A	3–2	12,093	
5 September 1959	Celtic	H	3–1	65,000	
12 September 1959	Hibernian	A	1–0	31,500	
19 September 1959	Ayr United	H	0–3	28,000	
26 September 1959	Partick Thistle	A	3–0	30,500	
3 October 1959	Dunfermline Athletic	H	4–1	17,000	
10 October 1959	Dundee	A	3–1	22,000	
17 October 1959	St Mirren	H	1–3	45,000	
24 October 1959	Aberdeen	A	5–0	20,000	
31 October 1959	Heart of Midlothian	A	0–2	40,000	
7 November 1959	Clyde	H	6–0	40,000	
14 November 1959	Arbroath	A	4–0	6,025	
21 November 1959	Raith Rovers	H	2–3	30,000	
28 November 1959	Motherwell	A	1–2	21,343	
5 December 1959	Kilmarnock	H	5–0	20,000	
12 December 1959	Third Lanark	A	2–0	25,000	
19 December 1959	Airdireonians	A	5–0	20,000	
26 December 1959	Stirling Albion	H	3–0	21,000	
1 January 1960	Celtic	A	1–0	50,000	
2 January 1960	Hibernian	H	1–1	56,000	
9 January 1960	Ayr United	A	4–2	23,000	
16 January 1960	Partick Thistle	H	1–1	40,000	
23 January 1960	Dunfermline Athletic	A	5–0	16,000	
6 February 1960	Dundee	H	0–0	22,000	
1 March 1960	Aberdeen	H	2–2	15,000	
5 March 1960	Heart of Midlothian	A	0–2	45,000	
19 March 1960	Arbroath	H	1–1	15,000	
26 March 1960	Raith Rovers	A	2–1	11,000	
16 April 1960	Kilmarnock	A	1–1	26,925	
18 April 1960	Motherwell	H	0–2	30,000	
25 April 1960	St Mirren	A	1–1	14,000	
27 April 1960	Clyde	A	1–4	10,000	
30 April 1960	Airdrieonians	H	0–0	13,000	
7 May 1960	Third Lanark	H	1–2	8,500	

=== Scottish Cup ===
Date	Round	Opponent	Venue	Result	Attendance	Scorers
30 January 1960	R1	Berwick Rangers	A	3–1	16,000	
13 February 1960	R2	Arbroath	H	2–0	30,000	
27 February 1960	R3	Stenhousemuir	A	3–0	12,300	
12 March 1960	QF	Hibernian	H	3–2	63,000	
2 April 1960	SF	Celtic	N	1–1	79,768	
6 April 1960	SF R	Celtic	N	4–1	72,710	
23 April 1960	F	Kilmarnock	N	2–0	108,017	

=== League Cup ===
Date	Round	Opponent	Venue	Result	Attendance	Scorers
8 August 1959	SR	Hibernian	A	6–1	44,700	
12 August 1959	SR	Motherwell	H	1–2	65,000	
15 August 1959	SR	Dundee	H	2–0	37,000	
22 August 1959	SR	Hibernian	H	5–1	35,000	
26 August 1959	SR	Motherwell	A	1–2	33,000	
29 August 1959	SR	Dundee	A	3–2	20,000	

=== European Cup ===
Date	Round	Opponent	Venue	Result	Attendance	Scorers
16 September 1959	QRL1	Anderlecht	H	5–2	80,000	
23 September 1959	QRL2	Anderlecht	A	2–0	40,000	
11 November 1959	R1L1	CH Bratislava	H	4–3	80,268	
18 November 1959	R1L2	CH Bratislava	A	1–1	60,012	
9 March 1960	QFL1	Sparta Rotterdam	A	3–2	50,000	
16 March 1960	QFL2	Sparta Rotterdam	H	0–1	82,587	
30 March 1960	QFR	Sparta Rotterdam	N	3–2	34,176	
13 April 1960	SFL1	Eintracht Frankfurt	A	1–6	80,000	
5 May 1960	SFL2	Eintracht Frankfurt	H	3–6	70,432	

== See also ==
- 1959–60 in Scottish football
- 1959–60 Scottish Cup
- 1959–60 Scottish League Cup
- 1959–60 European Cup
