= 1955–56 Rangers F.C. season =

Rangers
1955–56 season
- Manager: Scot Symon
- Ground: Ibrox Park
- Scottish League Division One: 1st P34 W24 D8 L4 F85 A27 Pts52
- Scottish Cup: Quarter-finals
- League Cup: Semi-finals
- Top goalscorer: League: All: Ralph Brand (40)

The 1955–56 season was the 76th season of competitive football by Rangers.

== Overview ==
Rangers played a total of 46 competitive matches during the 1955–56 season.

== Results ==
All results are written with Rangers' score first.

=== Scottish League Division One ===
Date	Opponent	Venue	Result	Attendance	Scorers
10 September 1955	Stirling Albion	H	0–0	25,000	
24 September 1955	Celtic	H	0–0	47,000	
8 October 1955	Airdrieonians	H	4–4	25,000	
15 October 1955	Partick Thistle	A	3–1	30,000	
22 October 1955	Stirling Albion	A	2–2	14,000	
29 October 1955	Queen of the South	A	1–2	16,500	
5 November 1955	Falkirk	A	2–1	18,000	
12 November 1955	Heart of Midlothian	H	4–1	51,000	
19 November 1955	Kilmarnock	A	2–1	25,600	
26 November 1955	Motherwell	H	2–2	40,000	
3 December 1955	Raith Rovers	H	4–0	26,000	
10 December 1955	Aberdeen	A	0–0	18,000	
17 December 1955	Hibernian	H	4–1	50,000	
24 December 1955	Dunfermline Athletic	H	6–0	30,000	
31 December 1955	Clyde	A	4–0	31,000	
2 January 1956	Celtic	A	1–0	47,000	
7 January 1956	Dundee	H	3–1	46,000	
21 January 1956	East Fife	H	3–0	27,000	
28 January 1956	Airdrieonians	A	4–0	22,000	
11 February 1956	Partick Thistle	H	1–0	45,000	
25 February 1956	St Mirren	A	1–0	43,900	
7 March 1956	Queen of the South	H	8–0	30,000	
10 March 1956	Falkirk	H	4–0	45,000	
17 March 1956	Heart of Midlothian	A	1–1	50,000	
21 March 1956	St Mirren	H	4–1	30,000	
24 March 1956	Kilmarnock	H	3–2	30,000	
31 March 1956	Motherwell	A	2–1	27,500	
2 April 1956	Dundee	A	3–0	18,500	
7 April 1956	Raith Rovers	A	5–0	20,000	
9 April 1956	East Fife	A	1–2	10,000	
18 April 1956	Aberdeen	H	1–0	45,000	
21 April 1956	Hibernian	A	2–2	30,000	
25 April 1956	Dunfermline Athletic	A	0–1	10,000	
28 April 1956	Clyde	H	0–1	25,000	

=== Scottish Cup ===
Date	Round	Opponent	Venue	Result	Attendance	Scorers
4 February 1956	R5	Aberdeen	H	2–1	66,000	
18 February 1956	R6	Dundee	A	1–0	42,500	
3 March 1956	QF	Heart of Midlothian	A	0–4	47,258	

=== League Cup ===
Date	Round	Opponent	Venue	Result	Attendance	Scorers
13 August 1955	SR	Falkirk	A	5–0	19,000	
17 August 1955	SR	Falkirk	H	4–3	35,000	
20 August 1955	SR	Queen of the South	A	2–1	15,000	
27 August 1955	SR	Celtic	H	1–4	75,000	
31 August 1955	SR	Celtic	A	4–0	61,000	
3 September 1955	SR	Queen of the South	H	6–0	45,000	
14 September 1955	QF L1	Hamilton Academical	A	2–1	18,000	
17 September 1955	QF L2	Hamilton Academical	H	8–0	40,000	
1 October 1955	SF	Aberdeen	N	1–2	79,763	

== See also ==
- 1955–56 in Scottish football
- 1955–56 Scottish Cup
- 1955–56 Scottish League Cup
