= 1882–83 Rangers F.C. season =

Rangers
1882–83 season
- President: James Watson
- Match Secretary: John Wallace MacKay
- Ground: Kinning Park
- Scottish Cup: Second round

The 1882–83 season was the ninth season of competitive football by Rangers.

== Overview ==
Rangers played a total of 2 competitive matches during the 1882–83 season.

== Results ==
All results are written with Rangers' score first.

=== Scottish Cup ===
Date	Round	Opponent	Venue	Result	Attendance	Scorers
9 September 1882	R1	Jordanhill	A	4–0		
30 September 1882	R2	Queen's Park	A	2–3	5,000	

== See also ==
- 1882–83 in Scottish football
- 1882–83 Scottish Cup
