= 1928–29 Rangers F.C. season =

Rangers
1928–29 season
- Chairman: Joseph Buchanan
- Manager: Bill Struth
- Ground: Ibrox Park
- Scottish League Division One: 1st P38 W30 D7 L1 F107 A32 Pts67
- Scottish Cup: Runners-up

The 1928–29 season was the 55th season of competitive football by Rangers.

== Results ==
All results are written with Rangers' score first.

=== Scottish League Division One ===
Date	Opponent	Venue	Result	Attendance	Scorers
11 August 1928	Kilmarnock	H	4–2	20,000	
18 August 1928	St Mirren	A	5–1	18,000	Marshall 2, McPhail 3
25 August 1928	Cowdenbeath	H	3–1	15,000	Morton 2, Meiklejohn (pen)
8 September 1928	Dundee	A	3–2	16,000	Meiklejohn 2 (1 pen), Morton
15 September 1928	Heart of Midlothian	A	1–0	48,000	Fleming
22 September 1928	Raith Rovers	H	7–1	16,000	Morton, Fleming 3, McPhail 2, McMillan
29 September 1928	Motherwell	H	0–0	40,000	
6 October 1928	Third Lanark	A	5–2	22,000	Morton, Meiklejohn (pen), McPhail, Muirhead 2
13 October 1928	St Johnstone	H	8–0	18,000	Morton 3, Muirhead, Fleming 3, Archibald
20 October 1928	Celtic	A	2–1	35,000	McMillan, Archibald
3 November 1928	Hibernian	A	2–1	22,000	Archibald, Craig
10 November 1928	Falkirk	A	4–1	15,000	Muirhead, Fleming 3
17 November 1928	Hamilton Academical	H	4–0	14,000	Fleming 3, Cunningham
24 November 1928	Clyde	A	3–2	10,000	Cunningham, Craig, Fleming
1 December 1928	Ayr United	A	3–1	18,200	Fleming 3
8 December 1928	Aberdeen	H	2–0	15,000	McPhail, Muirhead
15 December 1928	Airdrieonians	A	5–2	8,000	Morton, Archibald, Fleming 3
22 December 1928	St Mirren	H	1–1	15,000	Archibald
29 December 1928	Kilmarnock	A	3–1	30,000	Archibald 2, Fleming
1 January 1929	Celtic	H	3–0	60,000	Fleming 2, Archibald
2 January 1929	Partick Thistle	H	1–0	40,000	Meiklejohn (pen)
5 January 1929	Cowdenbeath	A	2–0	7,000	McPhail, Fleming
12 January 1929	Queen's Park	A	4–0	60,000	McPhail 3, Fleming
26 January 1929	Airdrieonians	H	2–0	25,000	Archibald, Cunningham
9 February 1929	Raith Rovers	A	3–1	9,000	McPhail, Fleming, Muirhead
26 February 1929	Third Lanark	H	5–1	6,000	
6 March 1929	St Johnstone	A	3–1	8,000	
9 March 1929	Hibernian	H	3–0	15,000	Buchanan, Fleming, McPhail
12 March 1929	Heart of Midlothian	H	2–0	12,000	Marshall, Fleming
16 March 1929	Falkirk	H	1–1	20,000	Marshall
27 March 1929	Hamilton Academical	A	1–3	6,000	Morton
30 March 1929	Clyde	H	0–0	12,000	
1 April 1929	Queen's Park	H	2–1	22,000	
9 April 1929	Ayr United	H	0–0	5,000	
17 April 1929	Motherwell	A	4–2	6,000	Morton 2, McPhail, Craig
20 April 1929	Aberdeen	A	2–2	18,000	Archibald, Morton
24 April 1929	Partick Thistle	A	1–1	10,000	
27 April 1929	Dundee	H	3–0	5,000	McPhail, Fleming, Marshall

=== Scottish Cup ===
Date	Round	Opponent	Venue	Result	Attendance	Scorers
19 January 1929	R1	Edinburgh City	H	11–1	10,500	Craig 2, Fleming 3, Cunningham, McPhail 2, Archibald, Morton 2
2 February 1929	R2	Partick Thistle	H	5–1	67,000	Craig, Fleming 3, Morton
16 February 1929	R3	Clyde	A	2–0	34,000	Muirhead, Archibald
2 March 1929	R4	Dundee United	H	3–1	49,000	Marshall, Fleming, McPhail
23 March 1929	SF	St Mirren	N	3–2	69,727	Muirhead, Archibald, Morton
6 April 1929	F	Kilmarnock	N	0–2	114,708	

== See also ==
- 1928–29 in Scottish football
- 1928–29 Scottish Cup
- Glasgow Dental Hospital Cup
