= 1958–59 Rangers F.C. season =

Rangers
1958–59 season
- Chairman: John Wilson
- Manager: Scot Symon
- Ground: Ibrox Park
- Scottish League Division One: 1st P34 W21 D8 L5 F92 A51 Pts50
- Scottish Cup: Winners
- League Cup: Group stage
- Top goalscorer: League: All: Ralph Brand (40)

The 1958–59 season was the 79th season of competitive football by Rangers.

== Overview ==
Rangers played a total of 43 competitive matches during the 1959–60 season.

== Results ==
All results are written with Rangers' score first.

=== Scottish First Division ===
Date	Opponent	Venue	Result	Attendance	Scorers
20 August 1958	Third Lanark	H	2–2	35,000	
6 September 1958	Celtic	A	2–2	50,000	
13 September 1958	Partick Thistle	H	2–1	41,000	
20 September 1958	Airdrieonians	A	4–5	18,000	
27 September 1958	Dundee	H	2–1	32,000	
4 October 1958	Dunfermline Athletic	A	7–1	17,000	
11 October 1958	St Mirren	H	2–1	40,000	
18 October 1958	Raith Rovers	H	4–4	31,000	
25 October 1958	Stirling Albion	A	2–2	17,475	
1 November 1958	Hibernian	H	4–0	17,000	
8 November 1958	Clyde	A	4–1	25,000	
15 November 1958	Falkirk	H	3–0	35,000	
22 November 1958	Kilmarnock	A	3–0	25,672	
29 November 1958	Motherwell	A	2–2	32,977	
6 December 1958	Queen of the South	A	6–3	10,000	
13 December 1958	Heart of Midlothian	H	5–0	66,000	
20 December 1958	Aberdeen	A	3–1	18,000	
27 December 1958	Third Lanark	A	3–2	30,000	
1 January 1959	Celtic	H	2–1	55,000	
3 January 1959	Partick Thistle	A	0–2	36,000	
21 January 1959	Airdrieonians	H	2–1	30,000	
24 January 1959	Dunfermline Athletic	H	1–0	30,000	
28 January 1959	Dundee	A	1–3	16,000	
7 February 1959	St Mirren	A	3–1	29,000	
18 February 1959	Raith Rovers	A	2–2	8,000	
21 February 1959	Stirling Albion	H	3–0	30,000	
4 March 1959	Hibernian	A	2–2	32,000	
7 March 1959	Clyde	H	3–1	33,000	
14 March 1959	Falkirk	A	5–5	15,000	
21 March 1959	Kilmarnock	H	1–0	25,000	
28 March 1959	Motherwell	H	2–1	45,000	
6 April 1959	Queen of the South	H	3–1	15,000	
11 April 1959	Heart of Midlothian	A	0–2	30,000	
18 April 1959	Aberdeen	H	1–2	41,000	

=== Scottish Cup ===
Date	Round	Opponent	Venue	Result	Attendance	Scorers
31 January 1959	R1	Forfar Athletic	A	3–1	9,813	
14 February 1959	R2	Heart of Midlothian	H	3–2	53,000	
28 February 1959	R3	Celtic	A	1–2	42,000	

=== League Cup ===
Date	Round	Opponent	Venue	Result	Attendance	Scorers
9 August 1958	SR	Heart of Midlothian	H	3–0	63,000	
13 August 1958	SR	Raith Rovers	A	1–3	12,000	
16 August 1958	SR	Third Lanark	H	2–2	38,000	
23 August 1958	SR	Heart of Midlothian	A	1–2	42,000	
27 August 1958	SR	Raith Rovers	H	6–0	25,000	
30 August 1958	SR	Third Lanark	A	3–0	28,000	

== See also ==
- 1958–59 in Scottish football
- 1958–59 Scottish Cup
- 1958–59 Scottish League Cup
