= 1961–62 Rangers F.C. season =

Rangers
1961–62 season
- Chairman: John Wilson
- Manager: Scot Symon
- Ground: Ibrox Park
- Scottish League Division One: 2nd P34 W22 D7 L5 F84 A31 Pts54
- Scottish Cup: Winners
- League Cup: Winners
- European Cup: Quarter-finals
- Top goalscorer: League: All: Ralph Brand (40)

The 1961–62 season was the 82nd season of competitive football by Rangers.

== Overview ==
Rangers played a total of 58 competitive matches during the 1961–62 season.

== Results ==
All results are written with Rangers' score first.

=== Scottish First Division ===
| Date | Opponent | Venue | Result | Attendance | Scorers |
|---|---|---|---|---|---|
| 23 August 1961 | Hibernian | H | 3–0 | 22,693 | Wilson, Brand (2, 1 pen.) |
| 9 September 1961 | Partick Thistle | A | 4–1 | 29,789 | Wilson, Millar, Scott, Brand |
| 16 September 1961 | Celtic | H | 2–2 | 76,198 | Christie, Baxter |
| 23 September 1961 | St Mirren | A | 1–1 | 21,451 | Scott |
| 30 September 1961 | Stirling Albion | H | 4–1 | 15,599 | McMillan, Millar (2), Brand |
| 14 October 1961 | Raith Rovers | H | 6–0 | 22,160 | McMillan, Brand (4), Wilson |
| 21 October 1961 | Motherwell | A | 2–2 | 37,288 | Wilson, Brand |
| 4 November 1961 | Third Lanark | A | 3–0 | 19,046 | Brand, Christie (2) |
| 11 November 1962 | Dundee | A | 1–5 | 10,503 | Brand |
| 18 November 1961 | Falkirk | H | 4–1 | 20,189 | Wilson, Millar (3) |
| 25 November 1961 | Dundee United | A | 3–2 | 28,697 | Caldow (pen.), Greig, Murray |
| 2 December 1961 | St Johnstone | H | 2–0 | 33,225 | Wilson, Brand |
| 16 December 1961 | Dunfermline Athletic | A | 0–1 | 15,409 | |
| 23 December 1961 | Aberdeen | H | 2–3 | 22,204 | Brand, Greig |
| 30 December 1961 | Kilmarnock | A | 1–0 | 13,212 | Millar |
| 6 January 1962 | Hibernian | A | 0–0 | 31,003 | |
| 10 January 1962 | Heart of Midlothian | H | 2–1 | 19,783 | Holt (o.g.), Scott |
| 13 January 1962 | St Mirren | H | 4–0 | 58,445 | Caldow (pen.), McMillan, Henderson, Murray |
| 20 January 1962 | Stirling Albion | A | 6–0 | 11,701 | Brand (2), Millar (3), Caldow (pen.) |
| 24 January 1962 | Partick Thistle | H | 2–1 | 14,935 | Brand, Millar |
| 31 January 1962 | Airdrieonians | A | 5–2 | 18,870 | Greig (2), Millar (2), Brand |
| 3 February 1962 | Airdrieonians | H | 4–0 | 27,569 | Brand (2), Millar, Greig |
| 10 February 1962 | Raith Rovers | A | 3–1 | 17,305 | Brand (2), Scott |
| 24 February 1962 | Heart of Midlothian | A | 1–0 | 8,706 | McMillan |
| 28 February 1962 | Motherwell | H | 2–1 | 38,571 | Millar, Scott |
| 3 March 1962 | Third Lanark | H | 3–1 | 25,372 | Brand, Baxter, Scott |
| 14 March 1962 | Dundee | A | 0–0 | 14,815 | |
| 17 March 1962 | Falkirk | A | 7–1 | 12,421 | Wilson (6), Scott |
| 24 March 1962 | Dundee United | H | 0–1 | 19,535 | |
| 4 April 1962 | St Johnstone | A | 4–0 | 16,387 | Wilson, Greig (2), Brand |
| 7 April 1962 | Dunfermline Athletic | H | 1–0 | 13,927 | Murray |
| 9 April 1962 | Celtic | A | 1–1 | 51,175 | Wilson |
| 25 April 1962 | Aberdeen | A | 0–1 | 19,817 | |
| 28 April 1962 | Kilmarnock | H | 1–1 | 10,606 | Wilson |

=== Scottish Cup ===
| Date | Round | Opponent | Venue | Result | Attendance | Scorers |
|---|---|---|---|---|---|---|
| 13 December 1961 | R1 | Falkirk | A | 2–1 | 22,184 | Millar, Wilson |
| 27 January 1962 | R2 | Arbroath | H | 6–0 | 22,184 | Millar (3), Brand (2), Glasgow (o.g.) |
| 17 February 1962 | R3 | Aberdeen | A | 2–2 | 23,000 | Caldow (pen.), Brand |
| 20 February 1962 | R4 R | Aberdeen | H | 5–1 | 47,363 | McMillan, Millar (2), Wilson, Brand |
| 10 March 1962 | QF | Kilmarnock | A | 4–2 | 47,363 | Caldow (pen.), McMillan (2), Brand |
| 31 March 1962 | SF | Motherwell | N | 3–1 | 23,000 | Murray (2), Wilson |
| 21 April 1962 | F | St Mirren | N | 2–0 | 127,940 | Brand, Wilson |

=== League Cup ===
| Date | Round | Opponent | Venue | Result | Attendance | Scorers |
|---|---|---|---|---|---|---|
| 12 August 1961 | SR | Third Lanark | A | 2–0 | 45,000 | Wilson (2) |
| 16 August 1961 | SR | Dundee | H | 4–2 | 21,000 | Brand (2), Wilson, Millar |
| 19 August 1961 | SR | Airdrieonians | A | 2–1 | 15,000 | Brand, Davis |
| 26 August 1961 | SR | Third Lanark | H | 5–0 | 30,000 | Wilson (2), McGillivray (o.g.), Millar, Brand |
| 30 August 1961 | SR | Dundee | A | 1–1 | 35,000 | Brand |
| 2 September 1961 | SR | Airdrieonians | H | 4–1 | 28,000 | Greig, Christie, Brand (2) |
| 13 September 1961 | QF1 | East Fife | H | 3–1 | 20,000 | Davis, Christie (2) |
| 20 September 1961 | QF2 | East Fife | A | 3–1 | 30,000 | Wilson, Scott, Brand |
| 11 October 1961 | SF | St Johnstone | N | 3–2 | 39,584 | Wilson (2), Caldow (pen.) |
| 28 October 1961 | F | Heart of Midlothian | N | 1–1 | 88,211 | Millar |
| 18 December 1961 | F R | Heart of Midlothian | N | 3–1 | 47,669 | Millar, Brand, McMillan |

=== European Cup ===
| Date | Round | Opponent | Venue | Result | Attendance | Scorers |
|---|---|---|---|---|---|---|
| 5 September 1961 | PRL1 | Monaco | A | 3–2 | 6,024 | Baxter, Scott (2) |
| 12 September 1961 | PRL2 | Monaco | H | 3–2 | 67,501 | Christie (2), Scott |
| 15 November 1961 | R1L1 | Vorwaerts Berlin | A | 2–1 | 14,268 | Caldow (pen.), Brand |
| 23 November 1961 | R1L2 | Vorwaerts Berlin | H | 4–1 | 3,012 | Kalinke (o.g.), McMillan (2), Henderson |
| 7 February 1962 | QFL1 | Standard Liege | A | 1–4 | 35,891 | Wilson |
| 14 February 1962 | QFL2 | Standard Liege | H | 2–0 | 76,730 | Brand, Caldow (pen.) |

== See also ==
- 1961–62 in Scottish football
- 1961–62 Scottish Cup
- 1961–62 Scottish League Cup
- 1961–62 European Cup
