= 1929–30 Rangers F.C. season =

Rangers
1929–30 season
- Chairman: Joseph Buchanan
- Manager: Bill Struth
- Ground: Ibrox Park
- Scottish League Division One: 1st P38 W28 D4 L6 F94 A32 Pts60
- Scottish Cup: Winners

The 1929–30 season was the 56th season of competitive football by Rangers.

Rangers won the Scottish Cup, beating Partick Thistle in the final.

== Results ==
All results are written with Rangers' score first.

=== Scottish League Division One ===
Date	Opponent	Venue	Result	Attendance	Scorers
10 August 1929	Motherwell	A	2–0	25,000	
17 August 1929	Hibernian	H	3–0	18,000	
24 August 1929	St Johnstone	A	1–0	10,000	
31 August 1929	Falkirk	H	4–0	28,000	
3 September 1929	Queen's Park	H	1–0	18,000	
7 September 1929	Aberdeen	A	1–1	31,700	
14 September 1929	St Mirren	H	2–1	25,000	
21 September 1929	Kilmarnock	A	0–1	23,000	
28 September 1929	Dundee United	H	3–1	15,000	
5 October 1929	Heart of Midlothian	A	0–2	41,000	
19 October 1929	Partick Thistle	A	1–0	15,000	
26 October 1929	Celtic	H	1–0	50,000	
9 November 1929	Hamilton Academical	H	5–2	12,000	
16 November 1929	Ayr United	H	9–0	12,000	
23 November 1929	Clyde	A	3–3	15,000	
30 November 1929	Morton	A	2–2	16,000	
7 December 1929	Dundee	H	4–1	12,000	
14 December 1929	Airdrieonians	H	2–0	11,000	
21 December 1929	Motherwell	H	4–2	22,000	
28 December 1929	Hibernian	A	2–0	18,000	
1 January 1930	Celtic	A	2–1	40,000	
2 January 1930	Partick Thistle	H	2–1	35,000	
4 January 1930	St Johnstone	H	6–1	15,000	
25 January 1930	Aberdeen	H	3–1	45,000	
8 February 1930	Kilmarnock	H	4–0	25,000	
11 February 1930	St Mirren	A	1–0	10,000	
19 February 1930	Dundee United	A	1–0	8,000	
22 February 1930	Heart of Midlothian	H	1–3	30,000	
4 March 1930	Queen's Park	A	3–1	13,000	
8 March 1930	Cowdenbeath	H	5–0	12,000	
15 March 1930	Hamilton Academical	A	1–1	18,000	
26 March 1930	Ayr United	A	3–0	6,000	
29 March 1930	Clyde	H	3–0	10,000	
19 April 1930	Airdrieonians	A	0–1	4,000	
21 April 1930	Morton	H	3–0	15,000	
23 April 1930	Dundee	A	3–1	5,000	
26 April 1930	Cowdenbeath	A	2–3	2,500	
30 April 1930	Falkirk	A	1–2	5,000	

=== Scottish Cup ===
Date	Round	Opponent	Venue	Result	Attendance	Scorers
18 January 1930	R1	Queen's Park	A	1–0	95,722	
1 February 1930	R2	Cowdenbeath	H	2–2	30,000	
5 February 1930	R2 R	Cowdenbeath	A	3–0	18,754	
15 February 1930	R3	Motherwell	H	5–2	26,300	
1 March 1930	R4	Montrose	H	4–0	12,500	
22 March 1930	SF	Heart of Midlothian	N	4–1	92,084	
12 April 1930	F	Partick Thistle	N	0–0	107,475	
16 April 1930	F R	Partick Thistle	N	2–1	103,686	

== See also ==
- 1929–30 in Scottish football
- 1929–30 Scottish Cup
