= 1934–35 Rangers F.C. season =

Rangers
1934–35 season
- Chairman: James Bowie
- Manager: Bill Struth
- Ground: Ibrox Park
- Scottish League Division One: 1st P38 W25 D5 L8 F96 A46 Pts55
- Scottish Cup: Winners
- Top goalscorer: League: Willie Thornton, Jimmy Duncanson (18); All: Willie Thornton, Jimmy Duncanson (25)

The 1934–35 season was the 61st season of competitive football by Rangers.

== Results ==
All results are written with Rangers' score first.

=== Scottish League Division One ===
Date	Opponent	Venue	Result	Attendance	Scorers
11 August 1934	Dunfermline Athletic	A	7–1	14,000	
18 August 1934	Motherwell	H	1–0	51,000	
22 August 1934	Heart of Midlothian	H	2–1	30,000	
25 August 1934	Dundee	A	2–3	22,500	
1 September 1934	Partick Thistle	H	4–0	35,000	
4 September 1934	Kilmarnock	A	3–1	13,000	
8 September 1934	Celtic	A	1–1	36,000	
15 September 1934	Ayr United	H	2–0	15,000	
22 September 1934	St Mirren	A	2–0	9,000	
29 September 1934	Hibernian	H	4–2	8,000	
6 October 1934	Airdrieonians	A	2–1	10,000	
20 October 1934	Clyde	A	1–2	30,000	
27 October 1934	Queen of the South	A	3–2	12,100	
3 November 1934	St Johnstone	H	3–1	15,000	
10 November 1934	Albion Rovers	A	5–1	9,000	
17 November 1934	Aberdeen	H	2–2	18,000	
24 November 1934	Queen's Park	A	4–0	22,729	
1 December 1934	Hamilton Academical	H	1–1	14,000	
8 December 1934	Heart of Midlothian	A	1–4	36,345	
15 December 1934	Kilmarnock	H	2–3	12,000	
22 December 1934	Dunfermline Athletic	H	8–1	7,000	
25 December 1934	Falkirk	H	1–0	10,000	
29 December 1934	Motherwell	A	2–2	25,000	
1 January 1935	Celtic	H	2–1	83,000	
2 January 1935	Partick Thistle	A	0–1	23,000	
5 January 1935	Dundee	H	3–1	14,000	
12 January 1935	Ayr United	A	4–2	12,000	
19 January 1935	St Mirren	H	1–0	20,000	
2 February 1935	Hibernian	A	2–1	23,000	
16 February 1935	Airdrieonians	H	3–1	10,000	
2 March 1935	Falkirk	A	3–0	15,000	
16 March 1935	Queen of the South	H	5–0	10,000	
20 March 1935	Clyde	H	4–2	5,000	
23 March 1935	St Johnstone	A	0–2	11,700	
13 April 1935	Aberdeen	A	3–1	17,000	
24 April 1935	Albion Rovers	H	2–2	6,000	
27 April 1935	Hamilton Academical	A	1–2	6,000	
30 April 1935	Queen's Park	H	0–1	6,000	

=== Scottish Cup ===
Date	Round	Opponent	Venue	Result	Attendance	Scorers
26 January 1935	R1	Cowdenbeath	H	3–1	16,000	
9 February 1935	R2	Third Lanark	H	2–0	25,000	
23 February 1935	R3	St Mirren	H	1–0	41,000	
9 March 1935	R4	Motherwell	A	4–1	29,777	
30 March 1935	SF	Heart of Midlothian	N	1–1	102,661	
10 April 1935	SF R	Heart of Midlothian	N	2–0	90,428	
20 April 1935	F	Hamilton Academical	N	2–1	87,740	

== See also ==
- 1934–35 in Scottish football
- 1934–35 Scottish Cup
