= 1933–34 Rangers F.C. season =

Rangers
1933–34 season
- Chairman: Duncan Graham (until January); James Bowie (from January)
- Manager: Bill Struth
- Ground: Ibrox Park
- Scottish League Division One: 1st P38 W30 D6 L2 F118 A41 Pts66
- Scottish Cup: Winners

The 1933–34 season was the 60th season of competitive football by Rangers.

== Results ==
All results are written with Rangers' score first.

=== Scottish League Division One ===
Date	Opponent	Venue	Result	Attendance	Scorers
12 August 1933	Airdrieonians	H	5–1	10,000	
15 August 1933	Ayr United	H	9–1	8,000	
19 August 1933	Hibernian	A	0–0	21,000	
22 August 1933	Clyde	A	6–1	15,000	
26 August 1933	Cowdenbeath	H	3–1	7,000	
2 September 1933	Motherwell	A	1–2	25,000	
9 September 1933	Celtic	H	2–2	49,000	
13 September 1933	Queen of the South	H	5–1	8,000	
16 September 1933	Ayr United	A	2–0	12,000	
23 September 1933	Dundee	H	1–0	12,000	
30 September 1933	Partick Thistle	A	4–3	20,000	
7 October 1933	St Mirren	H	3–0	14,000	
21 October 1933	Heart of Midlothian	H	3–1	30,000	
28 October 1933	Kilmarnock	A	3–1	14,252	
4 November 1933	Clyde	H	3–1	10,000	
11 November 1933	Queen of the South	A	4–0	10,979	
18 November 1933	St Johnstone	A	1–3	6,000	
25 November 1933	Falkirk	H	3–1	12,000	
2 December 1933	Aberdeen	A	2–1	17,000	
9 December 1933	Queen's Park	H	4–0	7,000	
23 December 1933	Airdrieonians	A	7–2	10,000	
30 December 1933	Hibernian	H	6–0	6,000	
1 January 1934	Celtic	A	2–2	45,000	Venters, McPhail
2 January 1934	Partick Thistle	H	2–2	20,000	
6 January 1934	Cowdenbeath	A	4–3	2,000	
13 January 1934	Motherwell	H	4–2	67,000	
27 January 1934	Dundee	A	6–0	20,000	Fleming 5, A.N.Other
24 February 1934	St Mirren	A	2–1	14,000	
10 March 1934	Heart of Midlothian	A	2–1	22,782	
14 March 1934	Hamilton Academical	A	2–1	10,000	
17 March 1934	Kilmarnock	H	2–2	6,000	
21 March 1934	Third Lanark	H	1–0	4,000	
24 March 1934	St Johnstone	H	3–0	13,000	
2 April 1934	Third Lanark	A	1–0	18,000	
7 April 1934	Aberdeen	H	2–1	18,000	
25 April 1934	Falkirk	A	3–1	15,000	
28 April 1934	Hamilton Academical	H	4–2	20,000	
30 April 1934	Queen's Park	A	1–1	7,765	

=== Scottish Cup ===
Date	Round	Opponent	Venue	Result	Attendance	Scorers
20 January 1934	R1	Blairgowrie	H	14–2	5,000	Fleming 9, Venters 2, Marshall 2, Nicholson
3 February 1934	R2	Third Lanark	A	3–0	27,038	Smith 3
17 February 1934	R3	Heart of Midlothian	H	0–0	67,543	
21 February 1934	R3 R	Heart of Midlothian	A	2–1	48,895	
3 March 1934	R4	Aberdeen	H	1–0	53,000	
31 March 1934	SF	St Johnstone	N	1–0	60,119	
21 April 1934	F	St Mirren	N	5–0	113,403	

== See also ==
- 1933–34 in Scottish football
- 1933–34 Scottish Cup
