= Derek Grierson =

Scottish footballer

Personal information
- Full name: Derek Dunlop Grierson
- Date of birth: 5 October 1931
- Place of birth: Prestonpans, Scotland
- Date of death: 7 September 2011 (aged 79)
- Place of death: Glasgow, Scotland
- Position: Forward

Senior career*
Years	Team	Apps	(Gls)
- Largs Thistle
1948–1952	Queen's Park	83	(51)
1952–1956	Rangers	69	(42)
1956–1959	Falkirk	74	(23)
1959–1960	Arbroath	27	(8)
1960–1961	Stirling Albion	3	(1)
1960–1961	Forfar Athletic	16	(4)
1961–1962	Coleraine		
1961–1962	Cowdenbeath	4	(0)
Total		276	(129)

International career
1950–1952	Scotland Amateur	7	(3)
1952	Great Britain	2	(2)
- * Club domestic league appearances and goals

Derek Dunlop Grierson (5 October 1931 – 7 September 2011) was a Scottish football player who played mainly as an inside right, best known for his time with Rangers and Falkirk.

== Career ==
=== Club ===
Grierson started out at Queen's Park before manager Bill Struth brought him to Rangers in 1952. He made his competitive debut in a 5–0 defeat against Heart of Midlothian on 9 August. He scored his first and second goals for the club a week later in a League Cup match against Aberdeen.

In his four seasons at Rangers, Grierson scored 64 goals in total. He won the Scottish league championship and Scottish Cup in his first season, 1952–53, and was the club's top scorer with 31 goals in the three major competitions, including four in one match against Airdrieonians. He also won a Glasgow Cup in 1953. He is noted as scoring the first ever live goal on British television.

Having only played seven times in two years after suffering a serious injury to his right thigh in early 1955 (causing him to miss out on the 1955–56 title-winning season entirely), he left Rangers in late 1956 and joined Falkirk in a swap deal involving Bobby Morrison, and soon won the Scottish Cup in 1957. He scored 23 league goals for the Bairns before leaving in 1960 to join Arbroath. He later had short spells with Stirling Albion and Forfar Athletic, then with Coleraine in Northern Ireland, before ending his career at Cowdenbeath.

Grierson retired to Newton Mearns, in East Renfrewshire. He died on 7 September 2011, aged 79. At the Falkirk v Rangers Scottish League Cup third round match on 21 September 2011, Grierson was remembered during a minute's silence at the beginning of the match, in memory of his contribution to both clubs.

=== International ===
Grierson played at Wembley for Scotland Amateurs and scored in a 2–1 win to clinch the British Championship. He won seven amateur caps. As an amateur, he was selected for trials for the Great Britain side that was to take part in the Helsinki Olympic Games of 1952. Manager Walter Winterbottom was duly impressed and Grierson made the squad - one of three Scots selected (he did not play in the only match played by the team, but had scored in two warm-up friendlies). He joined Rangers immediately after the Games, bringing his amateur period to an end.
