= David Haddow =

Scottish footballer

Personal information
- Full name: David Haddow
- Date of birth: 12 June 1869
- Place of birth: Dalserf, Scotland
- Date of death: 14 April 1955 (aged 85)
- Place of death: Inverness, Scotland
- Position: Goalkeeper

Senior career*
| Years | Team | Apps | (Gls) |
| 1888–1890 | Albion Rovers | | |
| 1890–1891 | Derby County | 16 | (0) |
| 1891 | Albion Rovers | | |
| 1891–1895 | Rangers | 66 | (0) |
| 1895 | Motherwell | 8 | (0) |
| 1895–1898 | Burnley | 38 | (0) |
| 1898–1899 | New Brighton Tower | 34 | (0) |
| 1899–1901 | Tottenham Hotspur | 26 | (0) |
| 1901–1902 | Albion Rovers | 0 | (0) |

International career
| 1894 | Scotland | 1 | (0) |
| 1894 | Scottish Football League XI | 1 | (0) |
- * Club domestic league appearances and goals

David Haddow (12 June 1869 – 14 April 1955) was a Scottish professional footballer who played as a goalkeeper. He won one cap for Scotland, in 1894.

== Career ==
In 1890, Haddow was involved in an altercation between players from Airdrieonians and his team, local rivals Albion Rovers. The charge was not proven. He won a Scottish Cup (1894) and two Glasgow Cups in a four-year spell with Rangers,

Haddow joined Tottenham Hotspur in November 1899, as a replacement for the injured George Clawley. His debut for Spurs was in a away game in the Southern District Combinations league against Bristol City. He helped Tottenham during the course of the season towards winning the Southern Football League title.

== Honours ==
Glasgow Rangers

- Scottish FA Cup winner: 1894

Tottenham Hotspur

- Southern Football League winner: 1899–1900
