= Donald Gow =

Scottish footballer

- With Sunderland in 1894

Personal information
- Full name: Donald Robertson Gow
- Date of birth: 8 February 1868
- Place of birth: Blair Atholl, Scotland
- Date of death: 11 October 1945 (aged 77)
- Position: Full-back

Senior career*
Years	Team	Apps	(Gls)
1884–1885	Cessnock Bank		
1885–1891	Rangers	16	(1)
1891–1892	Sunderland	16	(0)
1892–1893	Rangers	10	(0)
1893–1897	Sunderland	82	(1)
1897	New Brighton Tower		
1898	Millwall Athletic		
1899	Girvan		

International career
1888	Scotland	1	(0)
1892	Football League XI	1	(0)
- * Club domestic league appearances and goals

Donald Robertson Gow (8 February 1868 – 11 October 1945) was a Scottish footballer who played for Rangers, Sunderland and the Scotland national team as a full back.

== Club career ==
Previously playing for Rangers where he claimed a Scottish Football League winner's medal from his first spell at Rangers in the competition's first edition of 1890–91, Gow made his debut for Sunderland against Bolton Wanderers on 19 September 1891 in a 4–3 defeat at Pike's Lane. He won the English Football League Championship in 1892 and 1895. He played for Sunderland on two separate occasions, between 1891 and 1892 then 1893 and 1897 with a year back at Rangers in the interim, in total making 98 league appearances scoring one goal at his time at the club.

== International career ==
While a Rangers player, Gow made his debut and only appearance for Scotland against England on 17 March 1888 in a 5–0 defeat at Hampden Park. Gow captained the Scottish side in this game. It is likely he would have gained more caps while with Sunderland had the Scottish Football Association not operated a policy of selecting only home-based players until 1896 (a situation which also affected Sunderland teammate Ned Doig among many others). After this was relaxed, Gow played in the Home Scots v Anglo-Scots trial match of 1897 but unlike Doig, did not make the full Scotland team again.

== Personal life ==
His brother John was also a Scottish international.

== See also ==
- List of Scotland national football team captains
- List of Scottish football families
