= Andrew McCreadie =

Scottish footballer

Personal information
- Full name: Andrew Donald McCreadie
- Date of birth: 27 September 1863
- Place of birth: Girvan, Ayrshire, Scotland
- Date of death: 16 April 1936 (aged 72)
- Height: 5 ft 5 in (1.65 m)
- Position: Defender

Senior career*
Years	Team	Apps	(Gls)
–1889	Maybole		
1889–1890	Cowlairs		
1890–1894	Rangers	22	(1)
1894–1896	Sunderland	42	(8)
1896–1898	Rangers	66	(10)
1898–1899	Bristol St George		
1899–1900	Wishaw Thistle		

International career
1893–1894	Scotland	2	(0)
1893	Scottish Football League XI	1	(0)
- * Club domestic league appearances and goals

Andrew Donald McCreadie (27 September 1863 – 16 April 1936) was a Scottish professional footballer, who played for Rangers, Sunderland and appeared in two international matches for Scotland.

He played as a centre-back despite only measuring five foot, five inches tall. His brother Hugh McCreadie played for Rangers alongside him.

During his career, McCreadie won the Scottish league championship, the English league championship and the Scottish Cup.

== Death ==
McCreadie died on 16 April 1936 at the age of 72.
