= James Watson (Rangers footballer) =

Scottish footballer

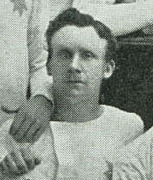
- Watson with Rangers in 1877.

Personal information
- Full name: James Andrew Kennedy Watson
- Date of birth: 21 February 1855
- Place of birth: Bridgeton, Scotland
- Date of death: 24 May 1915 (aged 60)
- Place of death: East Kilbride, Scotland
- Position: Forward

Senior career*
Years	Team	Apps	(Gls)
1874–1878	Rangers		

International career
1878	Scotland	1	(1)
- * Club domestic league appearances and goals

James Andrew Kennedy Watson (21 February 1855 – 24 May 1915) was a Scottish footballer who played as a forward.

== Career ==
Watson played club football for Rangers, taking part in the 1877 Scottish Cup Final, and made one appearance for Scotland in 1878, scoring one goal. He later served as a committee member, vice-president, and president of Rangers. Away from football he was a schoolteacher.
