= John Barker (Scottish footballer) =

Scottish footballer

Personal information
- Full name: John Bell Barker
- Date of birth: 28 June 1869
- Place of birth: Govan, Scotland
- Date of death: 29 June 1941 (aged 72)
- Place of death: Govan, Scotland
- Position: Outside left

Senior career*
Years	Team	Apps	(Gls)
1889–1892	Linthouse		
1892–1896	Rangers	59	(30)
1896–1898	Linthouse	18	(13)

International career
1893–1894	Scotland	2	(4)
1894–1895	Scottish League XI	2	(0)
- * Club domestic league appearances and goals

John Bell Barker (28 June 1869 – 29 June 1941) was a Scottish footballer who played for Linthouse, Rangers and the Scotland national team in the 1890s.

== Life and career ==
Barker was born in Govan (then a separate burgh from neighbouring Glasgow) in 1869, the son of John Barker and Margaret Trench Barker. His father worked as a fitter in the shipbuilding industry, which became a major industry in Govan in the mid-19th century.

Barker joined Rangers from Linthouse in early 1892 and made an immediate impact by scoring three goals in his first five appearances. He achieved a similar impact at international level, scoring a hat-trick in the first of his two Scotland caps against Wales in March 1893. He scored in his second, and what proved to be his last Scotland appearance, again against Wales, a year later in a 5–2 win. He scored for Rangers in their Scottish Cup triumph in 1894 against Celtic but left the club in 1896, returning to Linthouse for two seasons.

Barker also made a career in Govan's shipbuilding industry, working as a draughtsman. He died of lymphoma in 1941, one day after his 72nd birthday, in his hometown.

== See also ==
- List of Scotland national football team hat-tricks
