= Robert Marshall (footballer) =

Scottish footballer

Personal information
- Full name: Robert William Marshall
- Date of birth: 30 October 1864
- Place of birth: Glasgow, Scotland
- Date of death: 5 January 1924 (aged 59)
- Place of death: Glasgow, Scotland
- Position: Right half

Senior career*
Years	Team	Apps	(Gls)
–	St Andrews		
1883–1885	Partick		
1885–1889	Partick Thistle		
1889–1896	Rangers	99	(5)
1896–1897	Abercorn	16	(0)

International career
1892–1894	Scotland	2	(0)
1895	Scottish League XI	1	(0)
- * Club domestic league appearances and goals

Robert William Marshall (30 October 1864 – 5 January 1924) was a Scottish professional footballer, best known for his time with Rangers.

== Career ==
A right half, Marshall played for several clubs around Glasgow, starting at St Andrews, then Partick until they folded in the mid-1880s, and Partick Thistle. He joined Rangers in the summer of 1889, and was a key figure in the early years of the Scottish Football League. He won the shared 1890–91 championship, as well as the Scottish Cup in 1894. He made 124 appearances with Rangers in the two major competitions and scored five goals. In 1896 he moved to Abercorn.

Marshall won two Scotland caps in 1892 and 1894, captaining the side in the latter fixture, against Ireland. He also represented the Scottish League XI once in 1895.

== See also ==
- List of Scotland national football team captains
