= David Mitchell (footballer, born 1866) =

Scottish footballer

Davy Mitchell
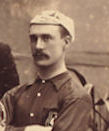

Personal information
- Full name: David Mitchell
- Date of birth: 29 April 1866
- Place of birth: Kilmarnock, Scotland
- Date of death: 6 December 1948 (aged 82)
- Place of death: Irvine, Scotland
- Position: Wing half

Senior career*
Years	Team	Apps	(Gls)
1886–1889	Kilmarnock		
1889–1900	Rangers	132	(6)

International career
1890–1894	Scotland	5	(0)
1893–1894	Scottish League XI	2	(0)
- * Club domestic league appearances and goals

David Mitchell (29 April 1866 – 6 December 1948) was a Scottish football player, best known for his time with Rangers.

== Playing career ==
Mitchell joined Rangers from Kilmarnock in September 1889. He was Rangers captain and won two Scottish Football League championships (the shared 1890–91 title and the perfect season of 1898–99), three Scottish Cups (1894, 1897 and 1898), four Glasgow Cups, two Glasgow Football Leagues and one Charity Cup. He made 171 appearances for the club in the league and Scottish Cup plus the 1891 championship playoff with Dumbarton, scoring eight goals. Mitchell also won five Scotland caps.

== Retirement ==
He retired in 1900 and moved to Denmark to coach.
