= Hugh McCreadie =

Scottish footballer

Personal information
- Full name: Hugh McCreadie
- Date of birth: 2 January 1874
- Place of birth: Girvan, Ayrshire, Scotland
- Date of death: 1941 (aged 66)
- Place of death: Girvan, Ayrshire, Scotland
- Position: Forward

Senior career*
Years	Team	Apps	(Gls)
1890–1896	Rangers	77	(24)
- * Club domestic league appearances and goals

Hugh McCreadie (2 January 1874 in Girvan – 1941 ) was a Scottish professional footballer, who played for Rangers. His brother Andrew McCreadie played for Rangers alongside him.

During his career McCreadie, a forward, won the Scottish league championship and the Scottish Cup, making 95 appearances in both for Rangers, scoring 32 goals.
