= 1896–97 Rangers F.C. season =

Rangers
1896–97 season
- President: John Robertson Gow
- Match Secretary: William Wilton
- Ground: Ibrox Park
- Scottish League Division One: 3rd
- Scottish Cup: Winners
- Top goalscorer: League: John McPherson, Tommy Hyslop (11); All: John McPherson (15)

The 1896–97 season was the 23rd season of competitive football by Rangers.

== Overview ==
Rangers played a total of 22 competitive matches during the 1896–97 season. They finished third in the Scottish League Division One with a record of 11 wins from 18 matches.

The club won the Scottish Cup that season. A 5–1 victory of Dumbarton on 20 March 1897 saw them win the trophy for only the second time in the club's history.

== Results ==
All results are written with Rangers' score first.

=== Scottish League Division One ===
Date	Opponent	Venue	Result	Attendance	Scorers
1 August 1896	St. Mirren	H	5–1	8,000	Turnbull (2), Hyslop, R.Crawford, J.Miller
22 August 1896	Third Lanark	A	1–1	15,000	Gibson
29 August 1896	Dundee	H	3–1	13,000	Hyslop, D.Crawford, Burgess (og)
5 September 1896	Hibernian	A	3–4		J.Miller (2), Turnbull
12 September 1896	Heart of Midlothian	H	5–0	14,000	R.Crawford, A.Smith, Oswald, Hyslop, J.Miller
21 September 1896	Heart of Midlothian	A	1–2	7,000	Gibson
26 September 1896	Abercorn	A	9–2		J McPherson (5), Turnbull (2), J.Miller, R.Crawford
3 October 1896	Hibernian	H	4–3	20,000	Turnbull (3), A.McCreadie
10 October 1896	Celtic	A	1–1	24,000	J .McPherson
17 October 1896	Clyde	H	2–1	4,000	J.McPherson (2)
24 October 1896	Third Lanark	H	6–1	5,000	Low (3), J.McPherson (2), Oswald
7 November 1896	St. Mirren	A	2–2		A.Smith, Mitchell
28 November 1896	Dundee	A	2–3	10,000	J.Miller, A.Smith
5 December 1896	Clyde	A	7–2	4,000	Hyslop (4), Unknown (3)
12 December 1896	Abercorn	H	6–1	2,000	Turnbull (2), Hyslop (2), A.Smith, Unknown
19 December 1896	Celtic	H	2–0	15,000	Low, J.Miller
26 December 1896	St. Bernards	A	2–3	2,000	J.Miller, Hyslop
20 February 1897	St. Bernards	H	3–2		A.Smith, J.McPherson, Russell (og)

=== Scottish Cup ===
Date	Round	Opponent	Venue	Result	Attendance	Scorers
9 January 1896	R1	Partick Thistle	A	4–2	6,000	Hyslop (2), N.Smith, N.Gibson
23 January 1896	R2	Hibernian	H	3–0	22,000	Low (2), J.McPherson
13 February 1896	QF	Dundee	A	4–0	16,000	N.Gibson, Hyslop, A.McCreadie, J.Miller
13 March 1896	SF	Greenock Morton	A	7–2	12,000	J.McPherson (2), Low, N.Gibson, J.Miller, Hyslop, A.Smith
20 March 1896	F	Dumbarton	N	5–1	15,000	J.Miller (2), Hyslop, J.McPherson, A.Smith

== Appearances ==
Player	Position	Appearances	Goals
(Scotland) Matthew Dickie	GK	23	0
(Scotland) Alex Miller	DF	2	0
(Scotland) Jock Drummond	DF	21	0
(Scotland) Neilly Gibson	MF	22	5
(Scotland) Andrew McCreadie	DF	23	2
(Scotland) David Mitchell	MF	22	1
(Scotland) R.Crawford	MF	7	3
(Scotland) James Millar	FW	20	12
(Scotland) Peter Turnbull	FW	11	10
(Scotland) Tommy Hyslop	FW	22	15
(Scotland) Alex Smith	MF	22	7
(Scotland) David Crawford	DF	7	1
(Scotland) Nicol Smith	DF	14	1
(Scotland) Jimmy Oswald	FW	6	2
(Scotland) John McPherson	MF	14	15
(Scotland) Jimmy Jackson	DF	1	0
(Scotland) Tommy Low	MF	14	7
(Scotland) Hay	DF	1	0
(Scotland) Robert Glen	DF	1	0

== League table ==
Pos	Team	Pld	W	D	L	GF	GA	GD	Pts	Qualification or relegation
1	Heart of Midlothian (C)	18	13	2	3	47	22	+25	28	Champions
2	Hibernian	18	12	2	4	50	20	+30	26	
3	Rangers	18	11	3	4	64	30	+34	25	
4	Celtic	18	10	4	4	42	18	+24	24	
5	Dundee	18	10	2	6	38	30	+8	22	
6	St Mirren	18	9	1	8	38	29	+9	19	
7	St Bernard's	18	7	0	11	32	40	−8	14	
8	Third Lanark	18	5	1	12	29	46	−17	11	
9	Clyde	18	4	0	14	27	65	−38	8	
10	Abercorn (R)	18	1	1	16	21	88	−67	3	Relegated to the 1897–98 Scottish Division Two

Source: statto.com
Rules for classification: Teams finish equal if level on points. Points system: 2 points for a win, 1 point for a draw, 0 points for a loss
(C) Champions; (R) Relegated

== See also ==
- 1896–97 in Scottish football
- 1896–97 Scottish Cup
