= 1897–98 Rangers F.C. season =

Rangers
1897–98 season
- President: John Robertson Gow
- Match Secretary: William Wilton
- Ground: Ibrox Park
- Scottish League Division One: 2nd
- Scottish Cup: Winners
- Top goalscorer: League: Robert Hamilton (18); All: Robert Hamilton (26)

The 1897–98 season was the 24th season of competitive football by Rangers.

== Overview ==
Rangers played a total of 25 competitive matches during the 1897–98 season. They finished third in the Scottish League Division One with a record of 13 wins from 18 matches.

The club won the Scottish Cup that season. A 2–0 victory of Kilmarnock on 26 March 1898 saw them win the trophy for the second time in two seasons.

== Results ==
All results are written with Rangers' score first.

=== Scottish League Division One ===
Date	Opponent	Venue	Result	Attendance	Scorers
4 September 1897	St Bernard's	A	4–2	7,000	Hamilton (2), J.Miller, Hyslop
11 September 1897	Hibernian	H	1–0	15,000	Hamilton
20 September 1897	Heart of Midlothian	A	2–2	13,000	Hamilton, A.Smith
25 September 1897	Third Lanark	A	3–0	15,000	Hyslop (pen), A.Smith, Hyslop
27 September 1897	Celtic	H	0–4	30,000	
2 October 1897	Heart of Midlothian	H	2–0	15,000	Hamilton (2)
9 October 1897	Partick Thistle	A	5–1	8,000	Mitchell, Gibson, Neil, Hamilton, Hyslop
16 October 1897	Clyde	A	8–1	6,000	A.Smith (3), J.Miller (2), Hamilton, Hyslop, J.McPherson
23 October 1897	Clyde	H	7–0	3,000	Hyslop (3, 1 pen), McPherson, Hamilton, J.Miller, A.Smith
6 November 1897	St Mirren	A	5–1		Turnbull (2), Low, McPherson, Hamilton
4 December 1897	St Mirren	H	9–0	5,000	Hamilton (4), McPherson (3), Neil, J.Miller
11 December 1897	Hibernian	A	5–0	9,000	Hamilton (3), Hyslop, A.Smith
25 December 1897	Dundee	H	5–0	6,000	J.Miller (4), A.Smith
3 January 1898	Partick Thistle	H	7–1	4,000	A.Smith (2), McPherson (2), J.Miller, Hyslop, Johnstone
12 February 1898	Dundee	A	1–2	11,000	A.Smith
19 March 1898	St Bernard's	H	8–1	5,000	Hyslop (3), McPherson (2), A.Smith, Neil, Turnbull
9 April 1898	Third Lanark	H	0–0	3,000	
11 April 1898 (Note: Replayed after original fixture on 1 January was abandoned due to repeated crowd encroachment.)	Celtic	A	0–0	15,000	

=== Scottish Cup ===
Date	Round	Opponent	Venue	Result	Attendance	Scorers
8 January 1898	R1	Polton Vale	H	8–0	3,000	J.Miller (2), J.McPherson (2), A.Smith, Hamilton, Goudie, Neil
22 January 1898	R2	Cartvale	H	12–0		Hamilton (4), A.Smith (2), Neil (pen), Mitchell, Kerr, N.Gibson, J.Miller, Coulrough (og)
5 February 1898	QF	Queen's Park	A	3–1	20,000	J.McPherson, Hamilton, J.Miller
19 February 1898	SF	Third Lanark	H	1–1	20,000	A.Smith
26 February 1898	SF Rpl	Third Lanark	A	2–2	16,000	Hamilton, A.Smith
12 March 1898	SF 2Rpl	Third Lanark	A	2–0	12,000	J.McPherson, N.Gibson (pen)
26 March 1898	F	Kilmarnock	N	2–0	14,000	A.Smith, Hamilton

== Appearances ==
Player	Position	Appearances	Goals
(Scotland) Matthew Dickie	GK	24	0
(Scotland) Nicol Smith	DF	16	0
(Scotland) Jock Drummond	DF	21	0
(Scotland) Andrew McCreadie	DF	4	0
(Scotland) Robert Neil	DF	19	5
(Scotland) David Mitchell	MF	17	2
(Scotland) Tommy Low	MF	14	2
(Scotland) Jimmy Millar	FW	22	14
(Scotland) Robert Hamilton	FW	22	16
(Scotland) Tommy Hyslop	FW	15	12
(Scotland) Alex Smith	MF	24	18
(Scotland) Neilly Gibson	MF	21	3
(Scotland) John McPherson	MF	19	14
(Scotland) Robert Glen	DF	5	0
(Scotland) Peter Turnbull	FW	5	3
(Scotland) David Crawford	DF	10	0
(Scotland) Jimmy Oswald	FW	5	0
(Scotland) Jamieson	MF	1	0
(Scotland) Murray	DF	3	0
(Scotland) Yuille	GK	1	0
(Scotland) Turner	MF	1	0
(Scotland) Neil Kerr	MF	3	1
(Scotland) Scott	DF	2	0
(Scotland) Goudie	MF	1	1

== League table ==
Pos	Team	Pld	W	D	L	GF	GA	GD	Pts	Qualification or relegation
1	Celtic (C)	18	15	3	0	56	13	+43	33	Champions
2	Rangers	18	13	3	2	71	15	+56	29	
3	Hibernian	18	10	2	6	47	29	+18	22	
4	Heart of Midlothian	18	8	4	6	54	33	+21	20	
5	St Mirren	18	8	2	8	30	36	−6	18	
5	Third Lanark	18	8	2	8	37	38	−1	18	
7	Dundee	18	5	3	10	29	36	−7	13 (Note: Dundee and Partick Thistle finished level on points but Dundee won a play-off match to determine ranking positions.)	
8	Partick Thistle	18	6	1	11	34	64	−30	13	
9	St Bernard's	18	4	1	13	35	67	−32	9	
10	Clyde	18	1	3	14	21	83	−62	5	

Source: statto.com
Rules for classification: Teams finish equal if level on points. Points system: 2 points for a win, 1 point for a draw, 0 points for a loss
(C) Champions

== See also ==
- 1897–98 in Scottish football
- 1897–98 Scottish Cup
