= 1899–1900 Rangers F.C. season =

Rangers
1899–1900 season
- Chairman: James Henderson
- Manager: William Wilton
- Ground: First Ibrox Park (until 9 December); New Ibrox Park (from 30 December)
- Scottish Division One: Winners
- Scottish Cup: Semi-finals
- Top goalscorer: League: Robert Hamilton (17); All: Robert Hamilton (23)
Home colours

The 1899–1900 season was the 26th season of competitive football by Rangers.

== Overview ==
Rangers played a total of 23 competitive matches during the 1899–1900 season. They finished top of the Scottish Division One with 15 wins from 18 matches, losing only once to Old Firm rivals Celtic.

The club again ended the season without the Scottish Cup after losing a semi-final replay to Celtic by 4–0, the original match was drawn 2–2.

== Results ==
All results are written with Rangers' score first.

=== Scottish League Division One ===
| Date | Opponent | Venue | Result | Attendance | Scorers |
|---|---|---|---|---|---|
| 19 August 1899 | Third Lanark | A | 5–1 | 16,000 | Campbell (2), J.Millar, Hyslop, N.Smith |
| 26 August 1899 | Clyde | A | 6–2 | 10,000 | Hyslop (2), McPherson, A.Smith, Robertson, Untraced (1) |
| 2 September 1899 | Heart of Midlothian | A | 4–3 | 20,000 | Campbell (2), Hamilton (2) |
| 9 September 1899 | Kilmarnock | A | 4–2 | 10,000 | Campbell, A.Smith, McPherson, Hamilton |
| 18 September 1899 | Heart of Midlothian | H | 1–1 | 15,000 | Hamilton |
| 25 September 1899 | Hibernian | H | 3–2 | 12,000 | Hamilton, A.Smith, Wilkie |
| 7 October 1899 | Celtic | H | 3–3 | 40,000 | Graham (2), A.Smith |
| 14 October 1899 | Clyde | H | 7–0 | 5,000 | McPherson (3), A.Smith (2), Sharp, Hamilton |
| 21 October 1899 | Hibernian | A | 2–0 | 16,000 | A.Smith (2) |
| 4 November 1899 | Dundee | H | 6–0 | 6,000 | A.Smith (3), Hamilton, Wilkie, Watson (o.g.) |
| 25 November 1899 | St. Bernard's | H | 4–3 | 5,000 | McPherson (2), Hamilton, Robertson |
| 2 December 1899 | St Mirren | A | 3–1 | | Hamilton (3) |
| 9 December 1899 | Kilmarnock | H | 6–1 | 5,000 | Wilkie (2), Hamilton (2), Robertson, Graham |
| 16 December 1899 | St Mirren | H | 4–1 | 2,000 | Neil (2, 1 pen.), A.Smith, Hamilton |
| 1 January 1900 | Celtic | A | 2–3 | 20,000 | A.Smith, Wilkie |
| 6 January 1900 | Third Lanark | H | 2–1 | 4,000 | Neil, McPherson |
| 20 January 1900 | Dundee | A | 3–2 | 12,000 | Hamilton (3) |
| 3 February 1900 | St. Bernard's | A | 4–1 | 4,000 | McPherson, Campbell, Gibson, Wilkie |

=== Scottish Cup ===
| Date | Round | Opponent | Venue | Result | Attendance | Scorers |
|---|---|---|---|---|---|---|
| 13 January 1900 | R1 | Morton | H | 4–2 | 7,000 | McPherson (2), Wilkie, A.Smith |
| 27 January 1900 | R2 | Maybole | H | 12–0 | 3,000 | Hamilton (4), Wilkie (3), A.Smith, Robertson; Hyslop, Neil, Gibson |
| 17 February 1900 | QF | Partick Thistle | A | 6–1 | 10,000 | Hamilton (2), A.Smith, McPherson, Wilkie, Graham |
| 24 February 1900 | SF | Celtic | H | 2–2 | 33,000 | A.Smith, McPherson |
| 10 March 1900 | SF R | Celtic | A | 0–4 | 32,000 | |

== Appearances ==
| Player | Position | Appearances | Goals |
|---|---|---|---|
| (Scotland) Matthew Dickie | GK | 22 | 0 |
| (Scotland) Neilly Gibson | MF | 21 | 2 |
| (Scotland) Alex Smith | FW | 21 | 17 |
| (Scotland) Robert Hamilton | FW | 20 | 23 |
| (Scotland) Jacky Robertson | DF | 20 | 4 |
| (Scotland) Jock Drummond | DF | 19 | 0 |
| (Scotland) Robert Neil | DF | 19 | 4 |
| (Scotland) James Graham | MF | 18 | 4 |
| (Scotland) John McPherson | MF | 17 | 13 |
| (Scotland) Jack Wilkie | FW | 16 | 11 |
| (Scotland) Nicol Smith | DF | 14 | 1 |
| (Scotland) David Crawford | DF | 10 | 0 |
| (Scotland) James Millar | FW | 8 | 1 |
| (Scotland) John Campbell | MF | 7 | 6 |
| (Scotland) Billy Dunlop | DF | 7 | 0 |
| (Scotland) Tommy Hyslop | FW | 6 | 4 |
| (Scotland) Andrew Sharp | MF | 3 | 1 |
| (Scotland) David Mitchell | MF | 2 | 0 |
| (Scotland) John McKinlay | DF | 2 | 0 |
| (Scotland) Billy Howden | GK | 1 | 0 |

== League table ==
| Pos | Team | Pld | W | D | L | GF | GA | GD | Pts | Qualification or relegation |
|---|---|---|---|---|---|---|---|---|---|---|
| 1 | Rangers (C) | 18 | 15 | 2 | 1 | 69 | 27 | +42 | 32 | Champions |
| 2 | Celtic | 18 | 9 | 7 | 2 | 46 | 27 | +19 | 25 | |
| 3 | Hibernian | 18 | 9 | 6 | 3 | 43 | 24 | +19 | 24 | |
| 4 | Heart of Midlothian | 18 | 10 | 3 | 5 | 41 | 24 | +17 | 23 | |
| 5 | Kilmarnock | 18 | 6 | 6 | 6 | 30 | 37 | −7 | 18 | |
| 6 | Dundee | 18 | 4 | 7 | 7 | 36 | 39 | −3 | 15 | |
| 6 | Third Lanark | 18 | 5 | 5 | 8 | 31 | 38 | −7 | 15 | |
| 8 | St Mirren | 18 | 3 | 6 | 9 | 30 | 46 | −16 | 12 | |
| 8 | St Bernard's (R) | 18 | 4 | 4 | 10 | 29 | 47 | −18 | 12 | Relegated to the 1900–01 Scottish Division Two |
| 10 | Clyde (R) | 18 | 2 | 0 | 16 | 24 | 70 | −46 | 4 | Relegated to the 1900–01 Scottish Division Two |

Source: "1899-1900 Division 1 - SPFL Archive". SPFL.
Rules for classification: Teams finish equal if level on points. Points system: 2 points for a win, 1 point for a draw, 0 points for a loss
(C) Champions; (R) Relegated

== See also ==
- 1899–1900 in Scottish football
- 1899–1900 Scottish Cup
