= 1896–97 British Home Championship =

Tournament details
- Host country: England, Ireland, Scotland and Wales
- Dates: 20 February – 3 April 1897
- Teams: 4

Final positions
- Champions: Scotland (9th title)
- Runners-up: England

Tournament statistics
- Matches played: 6
- Goals scored: 30 (5 per match)
- Top scorer: (England) Steve Bloomer (4 goals)

The 1896–97 British Home Championship was an international football tournament between the British Home Nations. It was won by Scotland after a late goal at The Crystal Palace which beat England to the trophy despite England's dominance of the competition up to that point. Ireland came third despite conceding 14 goals and Wales finished last having picked up only one point.

England began the tournament the strongest, scoring six without reply against the Irish in Belfast with Fred Wheldon claiming a hat-trick. Ireland recovered in the second match however, a high-scoring affair against Wales in which the Irish just claimed a 4–3 victory. Wales too improved in their second match, forcing a draw from Scotland in Wrexham, before Scotland too improved, beating Ireland 5–1 at home to temporarily take the top of the table. England surpassed them in the penultimate match, winning 4–0 over Wales and needing only a draw in the final game at home against Scotland to win the tournament. Scotland however were more than a match for the English and scored late to claim their 2–1 victory and win the trophy.

== Table ==
| Team | Pld | W | D | L | GF | GA | GD | Pts |
|---|---|---|---|---|---|---|---|---|
| Scotland (C) | 3 | 2 | 1 | 0 | 9 | 4 | +5 | 5 |
| England | 3 | 2 | 0 | 1 | 11 | 2 | +9 | 4 |
| Ireland | 3 | 1 | 0 | 2 | 5 | 14 | −9 | 2 |
| Wales | 3 | 0 | 1 | 2 | 5 | 10 | −5 | 1 |

Rules for classification: 1) points. The points system worked as follows: 2 points for a win and 1 point for a draw.
(C) Champions

== Results ==
20 February 1897

| England | 6–0 | Ireland |
|---|---|---|
| Wheldon 25', 30', 55'; Bloomer 19', 85'; Athersmith 75' |

Trent Bridge, Nottingham
Attendance: 13,490
Referee: Tom Robertson (Scotland)

6 March 1897

| Ireland | 4–3 | Wales |
|---|---|---|
| Barron 7'; Stanfield 62'; Pyper 66'; Peden 68' | | Meredith 19', 36'; Jenkyns 27' |

Solitude, Belfast
Attendance: 10,000
Referee: Tom Robertson (Scotland)

20 March 1897

| Wales | 2–2 | Scotland |
|---|---|---|
| Morgan-Owen 40'; Pugh 75' | | Ritchie 11' (pen.); Walker 60' |

Racecourse Ground, Wrexham
Attendance: 5,000
Referee: Thomas Armitt (England)

27 March 1897

| Scotland | 5–1 | Ireland |
|---|---|---|
| McPherson 5', 70'; Gibson 15'; McColl 25'; King 40' | | Pyper 62' |

Ibrox Park, Glasgow
Attendance: 15,000
Referee: James Cooper (Wales)

29 March 1897

| England | 4–0 | Wales |
|---|---|---|
| Milward 62', 64'; Needham 23'; Bloomer 44' |

Bramall Lane, Sheffield
Attendance: 5,000
Referee: Tom Robertson (Scotland)

3 April 1897

| England | 1–2 | Scotland |
|---|---|---|
| Bloomer 19' | | Hyslop 27'; Millar 83' |

The Crystal Palace, London
Attendance: 33,715
Referee: Richard Thomas Gough (Wales)

== Winning squad ==
- Scotland

| Name | Apps/Goals by opponent | | | Total | |
| Name | (Wales) WAL | (Ireland) IRE | (England) ENG | Apps | Goals |
|---|---|---|---|---|---|
| Neilly Gibson | | 1/1 | 1 | 2 | 1 |
| William Lambie | | 1 | 1 | 2 | 0 |
| John Patrick | 1 | | 1 | 2 | 0 |
| John McPherson | | 1/2 | | 1 | 2 |
| Tommy Hyslop | | | 1/1 | 1 | 1 |
| Jimmy Millar | | | 1/1 | 1 | 1 |
| John Ritchie | 1/1 | | | 1 | 1 |
| John Walker | 1/1 | | | 1 | 1 |
| Alex King | | 1/1 | | 1 | 1 |
| Bob McColl | | 1/1 | | 1 | 1 |
| George Allan | | | 1 | 1 | 0 |
| Jack Bell | | | 1 | 1 | 0 |
| Jimmy Cowan | | | 1 | 1 | 0 |
| Dan Doyle | | | 1 | 1 | 0 |
| Nicol Smith | | | 1 | 1 | 0 |
| Hughie Wilson | | | 1 | 1 | 0 |
| Bernard Breslin | 1 | | | 1 | 0 |
| Dave Gardner | 1 | | | 1 | 0 |
| Sandy Keillor | 1 | | | 1 | 0 |
| Jack Kennedy | 1 | | | 1 | 0 |
| James McMillan | 1 | | | 1 | 0 |
| Pat Murray | 1 | | | 1 | 0 |
| Jimmy Oswald | 1 | | | 1 | 0 |
| Davie Russell | 1 | | | 1 | 0 |
| William Baird | | 1 | | 1 | 0 |
| Matthew Dickie | | 1 | | 1 | 0 |
| Jock Drummond | | 1 | | 1 | 0 |
| Tommy Low | | 1 | | 1 | 0 |
| Duncan McLean | | 1 | | 1 | 0 |
| David Stewart | | 1 | | 1 | 0 |
