= British League Cup =

Tournament details
- Country: United Kingdom
- Dates: 30 April – 17 June 1902
- Teams: 4

Final positions
- Champions: (Scotland) Celtic
- Runners-up: (Scotland) Rangers
- Semifinalists: (England) Sunderland; (England) Everton

Tournament statistics
- Matches played: 4
- Goals scored: 18 (4.5 per match)
- Top goal scorer(s): Robert Hamilton (3); Jimmy Quinn (3)

The British League Cup was a football competition that was set up in April 1902 to raise money for the disaster at Ibrox Stadium, in which 25 people were killed and 517 injured at an international match between Scotland and England at the start of that month. The four clubs that participated in this competition were the winners and runners-up of the Scottish and English football leagues. It was a predecessor to the Empire Exhibition Trophy, Coronation Cup and Anglo-Scottish Cup. It succeeded the old World Championship matches between English and Scottish top clubs, as football became more widespread in the world and England-Scotland club matches could no longer be billed as World Championships.

== Summary ==
The competition took place in Glasgow, apart from one semi-final between Everton and Rangers played at Goodison Park in Liverpool, the replay for which took place at Celtic Park where Celtic had also played Sunderland. The final, played at the first Cathkin Park, was won 3–2 by Celtic against Rangers after extra time, with the winning goal coming so late that many newspapers reported that the result was a 2–2 draw. The event was held near to the accession date of King Edward VII and due to its Britain-wide scope was also referred to as the 'Coronation Cup' in some sources. The final was held six weeks after the semi-finals with the intention to play it as close as possible to the coronation ceremony event, but this was delayed until the August after Edward fell ill.

The trophy itself had first been won by Rangers the previous year as the Glasgow International Exhibition Cup. Despite its inscription still stating "Awarded to Rangers F.C." after Celtic won the British League Cup competition, they kept the trophy permanently.

== Participating teams ==
- (Scotland) Celtic (runners-up in 1901–02 Scottish Division One)
- (England) Everton (runners-up in 1901–02 Football League)
- (Scotland) Rangers (champions in 1901–02 Scottish Division One)
- (England) Sunderland (champions in 1901–02 Football League)

== Results ==
=== Semi-final ===
30 April 1902

Celtic (Scotland)	5 – 1	(England) Sunderland
McMahon; Marshall 10'; Campbell; McDermott	Report	Ferguson (pen.)

Celtic Park, Glasgow
Attendance: 4,000

1 May 1902

Everton (England)	1 – 1	(Scotland) Rangers
Young		Hamilton

Goodison Park, Liverpool
Attendance: 8,000

==== Replay ====
3 May 1902

Rangers (Scotland)	3 – 2	(England) Everton
Speedie; Hamilton; Walker	Report	Dilly; Brearley

Celtic Park, Glasgow

=== Final ===
17 June 1902

Celtic (Scotland)	3–2 (a.e.t.)	(Scotland) Rangers
Quinn	Report	Hamilton; Speedie

Cathkin Park (I), Glasgow
Attendance: 10,000
Referee: J. Hay

==== Teams ====
Celtic:
GK	Andrew McPherson
RB	Hugh Watson
LB	Barney Battles
RH	Willie Loney
CH	Henry Marshall
LH	Willie Orr
OR	Alec Crawford
IR	Johnny Campbell
CF	Jimmy Quinn
IL	Tommy McDermott
OL	Davie Hamilton

Rangers:
GK	Matthew Dickie
RB	Nicol Smith
LB	Davie Crawford
RH	Neilly Gibson
CH	James Stark
LH	John Robertson
OR	Willie Lennie
IR	Johnny Walker
CF	Robert Hamilton
IL	Finlay Speedie
OL	Alex Smith

== Benefit Tournament ==
There was a further 'Rangers Benefit Tournament' to raise funds at the start of the following season, held over a few weeks at various stadia, and with low attendances reported. Celtic also won that competition, defeating Morton 4–2 in the final at Ibrox after a 7–2 win over Rangers in the quarter-final.

== Other uses of the name ==
In the 21st century, suggestions have been made (mostly from Scotland, although some calls from English managers) that a 'British League Cup' could be played involving the amalgamation of the English EFL Cup and the Scottish League Cup due to the perception of both competitions diminishing in appeal under their current formats, with no such changes implemented as of 2023.

== See also ==
- Scottish Challenge Cup, lower-league Scottish cup competition with invitees from the top tiers of Wales, Northern Ireland and the Republic of Ireland, and the fifth tier of England
- Football World Championship, similar cross-border format competition in the late 19th and early 20th centuries
- Dubai Champions Cup, annual match in UAE between Scottish and English champions in late 1980s
- Anglo-Franco-Scottish Friendship Cup, cross-border competition in 1960s
- Coronation Cup (football), similar cross-border format competition in 1953
- Empire Exhibition Trophy, similar cross-border format competition in 1938
- Anglo-Scottish Cup, cross-border competition in 1970s and 1980s
- Texaco Cup, tournament for British Isles clubs in 1970s
