= 1897 in association football =

The following are the association football events of the year 1897 throughout the world.

== Events ==
=== February ===
- Jules Rimet founds Red Star Football Club in Paris.

== National League Champions ==
=== South America ===
Nation	Tournament	Winner	Score	Runner-up	Title	Previous title won
Argentina	Primera Division	Lomas	1-0 (both teams finished equal on points so a Championship final was held, which ended in a 1-1 draw and a 0-0 draw before Lomas won the third playoff)	Lanus	4th	1895

=== Europe ===
Nation	Tournament	Winner	Runner-up	Title	Previous title won
Belgium	First Division	Racing Club Bruxelles	F.C. Liégeois	1st	None
England	First Division	Aston Villa	Sheffield United	3rd	1896
France	French Championship	Standard	The White Rovers	3rd	1895
Ireland	Football League	Glentoran	Cliftonville	2nd	1894
Netherlands	Football League	RAP	HVV Den Haag	3rd	1894
Scotland	First Division	Heart of Midlothian	Hibernian	2nd	1895

== Domestic Cups ==
=== Asia ===
Nation	Tournament	Winner	Score	Runner-up	Venue	Title
India	Durand Cup	Black Watch	4-0 (after 0-0 in extra time)	Shimla Rifles	Annadale	1st

=== Europe ===
Nation	Tournament	Winner	Score	Runner-up	Venue	Title	Previous title won
England	FA Cup	Aston Villa	3-2	Everton	Crystal Palace	3rd	1895
Ireland	Irish Cup	Cliftonville	3-1	Sherwood Foresters	Grosvenor Park	3rd	1888
Scotland	Scottish Cup	Rangers	5-1	Dumbarton	Cathkin Park	2nd	1894
Wales	Welsh Cup	Wrexham	2-0	Newtown	Cricket Field	4th	1893
Sweden	Svenska Mästerskapet	Örgryte IS	1-0	Örgryte IS II	Idrottsplatsen	2nd	1896

== Clubs founded in 1897 ==
- Bristol City
- Juventus
- Royale Union Saint-Gilloise
- Northampton Town

== International tournaments ==
- 1897 British Home Championship (February 20 – April 3, 1897)

Scotland

== Births ==
- March 13 – Jock Ditchburn, English professional footballer (died 1992)
- June 16 – Ber Groosjohan, Dutch footballer (died 1971)
- Full date unknown
  - George Davies, English professional footballer (died 1956)
