= 1899–1900 Dundee F.C. season =

Dundee
1899–1900 season
- Manager: William Wallace
- Stadium: Dens Park
- Division One: 6th
- Scottish Cup: Quarter-finals
- Top goalscorer: League: Sandy Robertson & Fred McDiarmid (9); All: Robertson & McDiarmid (13)
Home colours

The 1899–1900 season was the seventh season in which Dundee competed at a Scottish national level, playing in Division One and finishing in 6th place. Dundee would also compete in the Scottish Cup. This was the first season Dundee played at their current home of Dens Park, after moving from Carolina Port. The club would also appoint their first ever manager this season with William Wallace.

== Scottish Division One ==
Statistics provided by Dee Archive

Match day	Date	Opponent	H/A	Score	Dundee scorer(s)	Attendance
1	2 September	Clyde	H	3–1	Stewart, Low, McDonald	9,000
2	9 September	St Mirren	A	0–4		3,000
3	16 September	Hibernian	H	2–2	Steven, Longair	6,000
4	23 September	St Bernard's	H	3–0	McDermott, Low, Keillor	5,000
5	7 October	St Bernard's	A	0–2		2,000
6	14 October	St Mirren	H	5–2	McDiarmid, Robertson (2), Low, McDermott	7,000
7	21 October	Kilmarnock	A	1–2	McDermott	3,000
8	28 October	Third Lanark	H	0–0		4,000
9	4 November	Rangers	A	0–6		6,000
10	11 November	Heart of Midlothian	A	1–4	Anderson	2,000
11	18 November	Hibernian	H	3–3	McDiarmid, Robertson (2)	2,000
12	25 November	Celtic	H	1–2	Robertson	10,000
13	2 December	Clyde	A	7–0	McDiarmid (3), Steven, Robertson, Low, Johnstone	
14	16 December	Heart of Midlothian	H	1–1	Steven	7,000
15	23 December	Celtic	A	1–1	Robertson	2,000
16	30 December	Third Lanark	A	3–3	Robertson (2), McDiarmid	
17	6 January	Kilmarnock	H	3–3	McDiarmid (2), McDermott	5,000
18	20 January	Rangers	H	2–3	McDiarmid, McDermott	12,000

=== League table ===
Pos	Team	Pld	W	D	L	GF	GA	GD	Pts
4	Heart of Midlothian	18	10	3	5	41	24	+17	23
5	Kilmarnock	18	6	6	6	30	37	−7	18
6	Dundee	18	4	7	7	36	39	−3	15
6	Third Lanark	18	5	5	8	31	38	−7	15
8	St Mirren	18	3	6	9	30	46	−16	12

Source: "1899-1900 Division 1 - SPFL Archive". SPFL.
Rules for classification: Teams finish equal if level on points. Points system: 2 points for a win, 1 point for a draw, 0 points for a loss

== Scottish Cup ==
Statistics provided by Dee Archive

Match day	Date	Opponent	H/A	Score	Dundee scorer(s)	Attendance
1st round	13 January	Douglas Wanderers	H	8–0	Robertson (2), Keillor, McDermott, Low (2), McDiarmid (2)	3,000
2nd round	27 January	Clyde	H	3–3	Robertson (2), McDiarmid	5,000
2R replay	17 February	Clyde	A	3–0	McDermott (2), McDiarmid	5,000
Quarter-finals	24 February	Queen's Park	A	0–1		8,000

== Player statistics ==
Statistics provided by Dee Archive

No.	Pos	Nat	Player	Total		First Division		Scottish Cup	
No.	Pos	Nat	Player	Apps	Goals	Apps	Goals	Apps	Goals
	FW	(Scotland) SCO	George Anderson	2	1	2	1	0	0
	MF	(Scotland) SCO	William Baird	21	0	17	0	4	0
	MF	(Scotland) SCO	Bob Crook	1	0	1	0	0	0
	GK	(Scotland) SCO	Bill Douglas	2	0	2	0	0	0
	FW	(Scotland) SCO	John Halkett	2	0	1	0	1	0
	DF	(Scotland) SCO	Willie Johnstone	18	1	15	1	3	0
	MF	(Scotland) SCO	Sandy Keillor	19	2	15	1	4	1
	MF	(Scotland) SCO	William Longair	22	1	18	1	4	0
	FW	(Scotland) SCO	Tommy Low	21	6	17	4	4	2
	FW	(Scotland) SCO	Tommy McDermott	22	8	18	5	4	3
	FW	(Scotland) SCO	Fred McDiarmid	16	13	12	9	4	4
	FW	(Scotland) SCO	David McDonald	4	1	2	1	2	0
	MF	(Scotland) SCO	George Philip	1	0	1	0	0	0
	FW	(Scotland) SCO	Sandy Robertson	17	13	15	9	2	4
	DF	(Scotland) SCO	Jimmy Sharp	21	0	17	0	4	0
	FW	(Scotland) SCO	David Steven	22	3	18	3	4	0
	FW	(Scotland) SCO	Harry Stewart	5	1	5	1	0	0
	GK	(Scotland) SCO	Tom Stewart	20	0	16	0	4	0
	DF	(Scotland) SCO	John Watson	6	0	6	0	0	0

== See also ==
- List of Dundee F.C. seasons
