= 1897–98 Scottish Cup =

Tournament details
- Country: Scotland

Final positions
- Champions: Rangers
- Runners-up: Kilmarnock

The 1897–98 Scottish Cup was the 25th season of Scotland's most prestigious football knockout competition. The cup was won by holders Rangers when they beat first-time finalists Kilmarnock 2–0 in the final at the second Hampden Park for a third victory in the competition. This was the first time the trophy had been retained since Queen's Park did so in 1882.

== Calendar ==
Round	First match date	Fixtures	Clubs
First round	8 January 1898	16	32 → 16
Second round	22 January 1898	8	16 → 8
Quarter-finals	5 February 1898	4	8 → 4
Semi-finals	19 February 1898	2	4 → 2
Final	26 March 1898	1	2 → 1

== First round ==
Home team	Score	Away team
Abercorn	1 – 1	Hibernian
Arthurlie	0 – 7	Celtic
Ayr Parkhouse	2 – 1	Kilmarnock Athletic
Bathgate	2 – 4	Cartvale
Clyde	1 – 3	Third Lanark
Dumfries Hibernians	2 – 7	St Mirren
Dundee	2 – 1	Partick Thistle
Dundee Wanderers	3 – 2	Orion
Bo'ness	0 – 6	Queen's Park
Kilmarnock	5 – 1	6th GRV
Leith Athletic	2 – 0	Port Glasgow Athletic
Lochee United	0 – 8	Heart of Midlothian
Greenock Morton	7 – 1	Motherwell
Raith Rovers	2 – 4	East Stirlingshire
Rangers	8 – 0	Polton Vale
St Bernard's	1 – 1	Dumbarton

=== First round replay ===
Home team	Score	Away team
Dumbarton	1 – 3	St Bernard's
Hibernian	7 – 1	Abercorn

== Second round ==
Home team	Score	Away team
Dundee	2 –0	St Mirren
Dundee Wanderers	3 – 6	Ayr Parkhouse
Heart of Midlothian	4 – 1	Greenock Morton
Hibernian	3 – 1	East Stirlingshire
Kilmarnock	9 – 2	Leith Athletic
Rangers	12 – 0	Cartvale
St Bernard's	0 – 5	Queen's Park
Third Lanark	3 – 2	Celtic

== Quarter-final ==
Home team	Score	Away team
Ayr Parkhouse	2 – 7	Kilmarnock
Dundee	3 – 0	Heart of Midlothian
Queen's Park	1 – 3	Rangers
Third Lanark	2 – 0	Hibernian

== Semi-finals ==
Home team	Score	Away team
Kilmarnock	3 – 2	Dundee
Rangers	1 – 1	Third Lanark

=== Semi-finals replay ===
Home team	Score	Away team
Third Lanark	2 – 2	Rangers

=== Semi-finals second replay ===
Home team	Score	Away team
Third Lanark	0 – 2	Rangers

== Final ==
26 March 1898

Rangers	2 – 0	Kilmarnock
A. Smith 59'; Hamilton 63'

Hampden Park
Attendance: 14,000

=== Teams ===
Kilmarnock:
GK	James McAllan
RB	Thomas Busby
LB	Robert Brown
RH	John Johnstone
CH	George Anderson
LH	David McPherson
OR	Robert Findlay
IR	William Reid
CF	James Campbell
IL	David Maitland
OL	Bobby Muir

Rangers:
GK	Matthew Dickie
RB	Nicol Smith
LB	Jock Drummond
RH	Neilly Gibson
CH	Bobby Neil
LH	David Mitchell
OR	Jimmy Millar
IR	John McPherson
CF	Robert Hamilton
IL	Tommy Hyslop
OL	Alec Smith

== See also ==
- 1897–98 in Scottish football
