= 1906–07 Dundee F.C. season =

Dundee
1906–07 season
- Manager: William Wallace
- Stadium: Dens Park
- Division One: 2nd
- Scottish Cup: Second round
- Top goalscorer: League: Billy Cox (17); All: Billy Cox (20)
Home colours

The 1906–07 season was the fourteenth season in which Dundee competed at a Scottish national level, playing in Division One, where they would finish in 2nd place, 7 points behind champions Celtic. Dundee would also compete in the Scottish Cup, where they would lose to Renton in the second round.

== Scottish Division One ==
Statistics provided by Dee Archive

Match day	Date	Opponent	H/A	Score	Dundee scorer(s)	Attendance
1	18 August	Port Glasgow Athletic	H	0–1		8,600
2	25 August	Hamilton Academical	A	3–1	MacFarlane, Cox, Dainty	6,000
3	1 September	Falkirk	H	3–2	Dainty, Cox (2)	7,000
4	8 September	Heart of Midlothian	A	0–0		11,000
5	22 September	Rangers	H	2–0	Cox, Russell	14,600
6	24 September	Clyde	A	1–1	Dainty	4,000
7	29 September	Hibernian	A	4–0	Fraser, MacFarlane, Cox (2)	12,000
8	6 October	Greenock Morton	H	1–0	Dainty	7,400
9	13 October	Motherwell	A	3–0	Webb, Russell, Fraser	
10	20 October	Celtic	H	0–0		27,000
11	27 October	Partick Thistle	A	0–0		4,000
12	3 November	Kilmarnock	H	4–2	Dainty, MacFarlane, Jeffray, Cox	8,100
13	10 November	Aberdeen	H	0–0		10,200
14	17 November	St Mirren	A	1–1	Russell	
15	24 November	Airdrieonians	A	2–1	Cox, MacFarlane	6,300
16	1 December	Port Glasgow Athletic	A	1–1	Fraser	
17	8 December	Aberdeen	A	3–0	MacFarlane, Webb (2)	9,500
18	15 December	Partick Thistle	H	5–0	MacFarlane, Dainty, McDermott, Fraser, Cox	7,800
19	22 December	Greenock Morton	A	2–1	Webb, McDermott	4,006
20	25 December	Third Lanark	A	0–2		5,500
21	29 December	St Mirren	H	2–1	Cox, McDermott	4,400
22	1 January	Clyde	H	0–2		8,380
23	12 January	Queen's Park	A	2–1	Mitchell, McDermott	6,000
24	19 January	Motherwell	H	1–0	MacFarlane	7,500
25	2 March	Third Lanark	H	2–1	McDermott, Fraser	5,500
26	9 March	Kilmarnock	A	3–1	Fraser, McDermott, Cox	
27	16 March	Hamilton Academical	H	1–0	Cox	5,000
28	23 March	Celtic	A	0–0		35,000
29	30 March	Airdrieonians	H	1–1	Jeffray	6,600
30	1 April	Rangers	A	2–2	Cox (2)	12,000
31	6 April	Falkirk	A	2–4	McDermott, Cox	4,500
32	8 April	Heart of Midlothian	H	2–0	Cox (2)	5,800
33	13 April	Queen's Park	H	0–0		6,500
34	20 April	Hibernian	H	0–0		5,100

=== League table ===
Pos	Team	Pld	W	D	L	GF	GA	GD	Pts	Qualification or relegation
1	Celtic (C)	34	23	9	2	80	30	+50	55	Champions
2	Dundee	34	18	12	4	53	26	+27	48	
3	Rangers	34	19	7	8	69	33	+36	45	
4	Airdrieonians	34	18	6	10	59	44	+15	42	
5	Falkirk	34	17	7	10	73	58	+15	41	

(C) Champions

== Scottish Cup ==
Statistics provided by Dee Archive

Match day	Date	Opponent	H/A	Score	Dundee scorer(s)	Attendance
1st round	9 February	Partick Thistle	A	2–2	Webb, Cox	13,160
1R replay	16 February	Partick Thistle	H	5–1	McDermott (3), Cox (2)	18,080
2nd round	23 February	Renton	A	0–1		6,500

== Player statistics ==
Statistics provided by Dee Archive

No.	Pos	Nat	Player	Total		First Division		Scottish Cup	
No.	Pos	Nat	Player	Apps	Goals	Apps	Goals	Apps	Goals
	FW	(England) ENG	Billy Cox	34	20	31	17	3	3
	GK	(Scotland) SCO	Bob Crumley	2	0	2	0	0	0
	DF	(England) ENG	Bert Dainty	36	6	33	6	3	0
	FW	(Scotland) SCO	Alex Fairweather	2	0	2	0	0	0
	FW	(Scotland) SCO	Jack Fraser	33	6	30	6	3	0
	FW	(Scotland) SCO	Davie Glen	4	0	4	0	0	0
	MF	(Scotland) SCO	William Henderson	21	0	21	0	0	0
	MF	(Scotland) SCO	Jimmy Jeffray	31	2	30	2	1	0
	MF	(England) ENG	Bert Lee	31	0	28	0	3	0
	FW	(Scotland) SCO	Sandy MacFarlane	37	7	34	7	3	0
	FW	(Scotland) SCO	Tommy McDermott	23	10	20	7	3	3
	MF	(Scotland) SCO	Stephen McDonald	16	0	13	0	3	0
	DF	(Scotland) SCO	John McKenzie	37	0	34	0	3	0
	FW	(Scotland) SCO	Alex Mitchell	8	1	8	1	0	0
	GK	(Scotland) SCO	Willie Muir	35	0	32	0	3	0
	FW	(Scotland) SCO	Allan Nimmo	2	0	2	0	0	0
	DF	(Scotland) SCO	Albert Oswald	15	0	13	0	2	0
	MF	(Scotland) SCO	Jim Ramsay	1	0	1	0	0	0
	FW	(Scotland) SCO	James Reid	1	0	1	0	0	0
	FW	(Scotland) SCO	John Russell	9	3	9	3	0	0
	FW	(England) ENG	Charlie Webb	29	5	26	4	3	1

== See also ==
- List of Dundee F.C. seasons
