= 1896–97 Dumbarton F.C. season =

Dumbarton
1896–97 season
- Stadium: Boghead Park, Dumbarton
- Scottish League Division Two: 10th
- Scottish Cup: Runners Up
- Top goalscorer: League: John Fraser/; Robert Hendry/; Henry Malloy (3); All: Robert Hendry (9)
Home colours

The 1896–97 season was the 24th Scottish football season in which Dumbarton competed at national level, entering the Scottish Football League and the Scottish Cup. In addition Dumbarton played in the Dumbartonshire Cup.

== Story of the Season ==
=== August ===
The first league game of the new season was played at home to Partick Thistle on 15 August, and after an evenly contested match the spoils were shared in a 2–2 draw.

The following Saturday Dumbarton visited Port Glasgow with a team that showed 3 changes, Juniors Rodger and Watson being given trials together with the addition of returnee Hugh Craig. Dumbarton led through a Malloy goal at half time, and while Port Glasgow equalised, the Sons regained the lead only for the home team to score twice in the last five minutes for a 3–2 win.

On 29 August Dumbarton were at home to play their league fixture against Greenock Morton. The team had a forced change with the departure of McIlhany, his place being taken by Reid. With a gale blowing down the field Dumbarton conceded a goal against the wind before half time. Morton scored another two in the second half, but Dumbarton put up a sterling struggle considering that most of the second 45 minutes were played with only 8 men as both Thomsons and Reid were all lost to injury.

=== September ===
On 5 September Dumbarton travelled to Rugby Park to play Kilmarnock. With the previous week's injuries, a reshuffle was required with Morrice and Weir returning together with Skinner stepping up from the reserves. Unfortunately in a poor performance the home team cruised to victory by 5–1.

It was another away tie the following week but the journey was short as the opponents were local rivals Renton. William Thomson returned to the side but it made little difference as the Sons fell to a disappointing 4–0 defeat.

After a weather disrupted weekend Dumbarton resumed league business at Boghead on 26 September against Leith Athletic. The match was a close affair but in the end Dumbarton succumbed to yet another defeat by 2–1.

=== October ===
The first ever league fixture against Airdrie was played at Broomfield Park on 3 October. More departures in the form of Craig, McIlhany and Weir meant further team changes including new boys McGregor and Adamson. The game however finished with the same story of a Dumbarton defeat – this time by 3–2.

For many seasons the relationship between Dumbarton and Queen's Park had been cold but on 10 October the teams met in a friendly at Hampden Park. Certainly this match – over two 35 minute halves - was between amateur sides but the Queen's Park had for many years attracted the cream of the crop and it showed in the 6–1 beating that was handed out.

The following Saturday it was a trip to Cappielow Park to play Morton in the return league fixture. There was another new face – Fraser - playing at inside left but while Dumbarton's play was much improved on previous outings it was yet another defeat – 3–1.

Yet another away fixture – the sixth in nine league matches – was set for 24 October. The venue was Beechwood Park to play Leith Athletic and the team showed three more changes with the introduction of Bowman in goals, McBirnie at left back and Hodge at inside left. The result was a disastrous 7–1 defeat.

There was a free week on 31 October but with nine matches down and nine to go, Dumbarton had a solitary point to show for their efforts and were marooned at the foot of the table.

=== November ===
The first game of November saw neighbours Renton visit Boghead on league duty. Docherty was back in goals but despite holding out 1–1 at half time it was Renton who took the points by scoring two more in the second half for a 3–1 win.

The only point gathered so far in the league was against Partick Thistle back in August and it was hoped that fortunes might pick up for the return fixture in Glasgow on 14 November. The first half was evenly contested with the Jags leading by the only goal but in the second half Dumbarton fell away and lost by 6–1.

The following weekend a friendly was arranged with the recently revived Vale of Leven at Millburn Park. In a dull game a 1–1 draw was achieved.

On 28 November Dumbarton visited Govan to play Linthouse in their first league fixture of the season. Dumbarton trialled Mitchell at left back and at half time the team had played well to lead 2–1. Linthouse levelled the scores in the second half but Dumbarton had at last secured their second point.

=== December ===
On 5 December Dumbarton welcomed Airdrie to Boghead for their return league fixture. Helping out the team was Dumbarton old boy Hugh Mair at inside left. In October the Sons had only lost out to the odd goal in five but on this occasion the visitors had the game tied up by half time – leading 3–0. Dumbarton got one back through Hendry but it was too little too late.

The weather put paid to any further play by Dumbarton during December and so 1896 found them still propping up the Second Division and still awaiting their first victory.

=== January ===
The first game of 1897 on 9 January pitted Dumbarton against Raith Rovers at Boghead in the First Round of the Scottish Cup. While the match was a closely contested affair, the Rovers reached the interval a goal ahead. However Dumbarton came back in the second half and two Mair goals sealed the tie and the Sons first victory of the season.

The Second Round of the Cup draw Dumbarton against Leith Athletic and while the tie was to have been played on 16 January, due to the weather it was not until 6 February that the game went ahead.

=== February ===
The team to play Leith showed a number of changes including the return of William Thomson at inside left and new boy Lewis Mackie just arrived from Artizan Thistle. In addition old boy Leitch Keir made a guest appearance for the club. At the interval all looked bleak as Leith had built up a 4–1 lead, but the new spirit of the Dumbarton side came through as they scored three times in the second half to earn a replay.

On 13 February the replay was held at Beechwood with the Dumbarton team strengthened further with the return of Alex Miller who took Keir's place and the introduction of Willie Speedie from Artizan Thistle at inside right. A Hendry hat trick had Dumbarton in ‘easy street’ but Leith reduced the leeway before the interval. The Second Division leaders showed their character and scored twice in the second half to take the tie to a second replay.

The following Saturday both teams went to Fir Park, Motherwell to finally decide this tie. Dumbarton fielded an unchanged side and with new boys Mackie and Speedie playing exceptionally, for the second week running Dumbarton built up a 3–0 lead. Again Leith fought back with two goals but were unable to find an equaliser – and so the Sons advanced. Alex Miller's appearance in this tie was his 112th competitive match for the club - overtaking Tom McMillan's record set in 1895.

Dumbarton's toughest match to date came on 27 February with a quarter final tie against First Division St Bernards. The Edinburgh side were installed as one of the favourites for the Cup, but an unchanged Dumbarton side were not about to stand aside. A penalty was saved by Docherty ensuring that half time was reached goalless. However William Thomson made no mistake with his penalty in the second half, and this followed up with a Dan Thomson strike meant that Dumbarton had reached the semi-final stage of the national cup for the first time since 1889.

=== March ===
On 6 March Dumbarton returned to league duty at Boghead against Linthouse. The Sons had earned one of their two points at Govan in August and hopes were high that an unchanged side could achieve their first league victory. As it was the match, while full of goals was sloppy, and whether or not Dumbarton had their minds on the cup, the game finished in a 5–4 defeat.

And so the following Saturday Kilmarnock who were having some success in the Second Division arrived at Boghead to decide who would head to Hampden in the final of the Scottish Cup. For the fifth match in succession Dumbarton's team was unchanged and in the first half matters were equal as Dan Thomson's penalty was cancelled out by Kilmarnock before half time. In the second period Dumbarton raced to a 4–1 lead, but Killie pegged this back to 4–3 before the final whistle sounded.

On 20 March at Hampden Park, Dumbarton played in their first final since 1891, facing Glasgow Rangers before a crowd of 13,000. Rangers took a two-goal lead before William Thomson scored for Dumbarton. A subsequent Dumbarton goal was disallowed for offside, and Rangers eventually won the match 5–1.

=== April ===
Dumbarton's next game was a county cup semi final tie against Newtown Thistle on 3 April. In a close game Dumbarton eventually ran out winners by 4–3.

The following Saturday Dumbarton played their return league fixture against Kilmarnock at Boghead. Kilmarnock had only one of their away fixtures and the Sons were anxious to show the home crowd their cup spirit. In an even first half Killie were ahead by a goal, but they more than gained revenge for their Scottish Cup semi final exit by easily brushing Dumbarton aside 6–0. The match would be Alex Miller's final game for the club. During his nine seasons he set a new record of 117 appearances in all national competitive matches.

On 17 April, Scottish Cup finalists Dumbarton travelled to Fir Park to play Qualifying Cup finalists Motherwell. It was decided long before that Dumbarton would finish bottom of the division but two points against the team immediately above them would be a success of sorts. Despite missing Saunderson and Miller the game started well as Fraser put Dumbarton into an early lead but from then on it was all Motherwell who won at a stroll by 5–1.

A week later Dumbarton and Vale of Leven met at Tontine Park to decide the fate of the Dumbartonshire Cup. Scott took Docherty's place in goal but it was expected that the ‘league’ side would come out on top. Up until 15 minutes from time Dumbarton had the best of the game and led 2-1 but the Vale found an extra gear and scored twice to secure the trophy.

Two days later on 26 April a Dumbartonshire Select XI played against Rangers for the benefit of Renton. Docherty, Mauchan, Hendry and Fraser all played in the county team which lost 2–1.

=== May ===
On 1 May Dumbarton played Vale of Leven again in a friendly at Boghead. This time the Sons made up for the disappointment of the previous week and gave their neighbours a lesson in goal scoring with a 5-1 drubbing.

The following Saturday Dumbarton played their penultimate league tie at Boghead against Port Glasgow – and after 16 failed attempts the Sons finally broke their ‘duck’ to win their first league fixture with a comfortable 4–1 win.

Then on 15 May Dumbarton finished off their season with a further success – a home league victory over Motherwell. Thus amassing 6 points from their 18 games but still stuck at the bottom of the league.

=== June ===
By finishing bottom, Dumbarton required to go through the election process for continued membership of the Scottish League. Despite the poor league performance it was hoped that the later cup successes would be a positive factor. Nonetheless, on 1 June it was Ayr from the Ayrshire Combination League that would step up, and just five years after retaining the league championship Dumbarton found themselves out in the wilderness. Full results of election as follows:

Team	Votes	Result
Motherwell	34	Re-elected to Second Division
Port Glasgow Athletic	27	Re-elected to Second Division
Ayr	24	Promoted from Ayrshire Combination
Dumbarton	17	Not elected to Second Division

== Match results ==
=== Scottish League ===
15 August 1896 Scottish League	Dumbarton	2–2	Partick Thistle	Boghead Park
	Malloy; McIlhany		Paul; Lawson	Attendance: 2,000

22 August 1896 Scottish League	Port Glasgow	3–2	Dumbarton	Clune Park
	Carson; McCorquodale 85'		Malloy 20'; McIlhany

29 August 1896 Scottish League	Dumbarton	0–3	Morton	Boghead Park
			Stone 35' Chalmers

5 September 1896 Scottish League	Kilmarnock	5–1	Dumbarton	Rugby Park
	Brown 10'; Watson; Fulton; Campbell 55'; McLean		scrimmage

12 September 1896 Scottish League	Renton	4–0	Dumbarton	Tontine Park
	Goal

26 September 1896 Scottish League	Dumbarton	1–2	Leith Athletic	Boghead Park
	Malloy		Marshall

3 October 1896 Scottish League	Airdrie	3–2	Dumbarton	Broomfield Park
	scrimmage Docherty 55'; Kyle		Saunderson; Adamson

17 October 1896 Scottish League	Morton	3–1	Dumbarton	Cappielow Park
	Chalmers; Drysdale		Fraser	Referee: Mr Macpherson

24 October 1896 Scottish League	Leith Athletic	7–1	Dumbarton	Beechwood Park (Leith)
	Goal		Hendry	Referee: Mr King

7 November 1896 Scottish League	Dumbarton	1–3	Renton	Boghead Park
	Boyle		Goal

14 November 1896 Scottish League	Partick Thistle	6–1	Dumbarton	Meadowside
	Donaldson; Lamont; Lawson; Paul		Fraser	Attendance: 1,500; Referee: Mr Jackson

28 November 1896 Scottish League	Linthouse	2–2	Dumbarton	Langlands Park (Govan)
	McTear		Hendry 2'; Saunderson

5 December 1896 Scottish League	Dumbarton	1–3	Airdrie	Boghead Park
	Hendry		Kyle 5' scrimmage

6 March 1897 Scottish League	Dumbarton	4–5	Linthouse	Boghead Park
	Miller; Mackie; Speedie; Thomson, W		Goal

10 April 1897 Scottish League	Dumbarton	0–6	Kilmarnock	Boghead Park
			20' (pen.)

17 April 1897 Scottish League	Motherwell	5–1	Dumbarton	Fir Park
	Thomson, W (o.g.); Logan		Fraser

8 May 1897 Scottish League	Dumbarton	4–1	Port Glasgow	Boghead Park
	(pen.)		Goal

15 May 1897 Scottish League	Dumbarton	3–1	Motherwell	Boghead Park
	Mackie; Morrice; Reid		Goal

=== Scottish Cup ===
9 January 1897 Cup R1	Dumbarton	2–1	Raith Rovers	Boghead Park
	Mair 55', 75'		10'	Referee: Mr Wallace

6 February 1897 Cup R2	Dumbarton	4–4	Leith Athletic	Boghead Park
	Thomson, W Gracie; Hendry; Mackie		Laidlaw; Marshall	Referee: Mr Quairns

13 February 1897 Cup R2r	Leith Athletic	3–3	Dumbarton	Beechwood Park (Leith)
	Hendry		Laidlaw; Marshall	Attendance: 6,000; Referee: Mr Quairns

20 February 1897 Cup R2r	Dumbarton	3–2	Leith Athletic	Fir Park
	Mackie; Speedie; Fraser		Laidlaw; Fotheringham	Attendance: 4,000; Referee: Mr Dickson

27 February 1897 CupR3	Dumbarton	2–0	St Bernard's	Boghead Park
	Thomson, D Hendry			Attendance: 6,000; Referee: Mr McArthur

13 March 1897 Cup SF	Dumbarton	4–3	Kilmarnock	Boghead Park
	Thomson, D 20' (pen.); Mackie; Hendry; Thomson, W		Campbell 45'	Attendance: 5,000; Referee: Mr McLeod

20 March 1897 Cup F	Dumbarton	1–5	Rangers	Cathkin Park
	Thomson, W		Miller; Hyslop; McPherson; Smith, A	Attendance: 15,000; Referee: Mr Simpson

=== Dumbartonshire Cup ===
3 April 1897 Semi-final	Newtown Thistle	3–4	Dumbarton	Dumbarton
	Goal		Goal

24 April 1897 Final	Dumbarton	2–3	Vale of Leven	Tontine Park
	Speedie		Goal	Attendance: 3,000

=== Friendlies ===
10 October 1896 Friendly	Queen's Park	6–1	Dumbarton	Hampden Park
	McColl 1'; Stewart 3' (o.g.) scrimmage Robb		Adamson	Attendance: 1,000

21 November 1896 Friendly	Vale of Leven	1–1	Dumbarton	Millburn Park
	Goal		Goal

1 May 1897 Friendly	Dumbarton	5–1	Vale of Leven	Boghead Park
	Speedie		Goal

== Player statistics ==
The drop to the Second Division had a limited effect on Dumbarton's strongest XI, although they did lose the services of Billy Nash to Clyde and Samuel Woods to Stoke. In addition a number of first XI players decided to leave during the season with John Gillan heading to Everton, Robert Hendry to Rangers and Albert Saunderson also leaving for pastures new. A good many more would follow.

However the side was strengthened by the return of former internationalist William Thomson.

No.	Pos	Nat	Player	Total		Second Division		Scottish Cup	
No.	Pos	Nat	Player	Apps	Goals	Apps	Goals	Apps	Goals
	GK	(Scotland) SCO	Bowman	1	0	1	0	0	0
	GK	(Scotland) SCO	John Docherty	25	0	18	0	7	0
	DF	(Scotland) SCO	Andrew Mauchlen	9	0	4	0	5	0
	DF	(Scotland) SCO	McBirnie	3	0	3	0	0	0
	DF	(Scotland) SCO	James McGregor	1	0	1	0	0	0
	DF	(Scotland) SCO	John McNicol	1	0	1	0	0	0
	DF	(Scotland) SCO	John Rodger	12	0	10	0	2	0
	DF	(Scotland) SCO	Samuel Skinner	4	0	4	0	0	0
	DF	(Scotland) SCO	Daniel Thomson	19	2	12	0	7	2
	MF	(Scotland) SCO	Duncan	1	0	1	0	0	0
	MF	(Scotland) SCO	Forrester	2	0	2	0	0	0
	MF	(Scotland) SCO	John Gillan	23	0	16	0	7	0
	MF	(Scotland) SCO	Robert Hendry	23	9	17	3	6	6
	MF	(Scotland) SCO	Leitch Keir	1	0	0	0	1	0
	MF	(Scotland) SCO	Alex Miller	7	1	2	1	5	0
	MF	(Scotland) SCO	Henry Mitchell	5	0	5	0	0	0
	MF	(Scotland) SCO	Morrice	9	1	9	1	0	0
	FW	(Scotland) SCO	Adamson	2	1	2	1	0	0
	FW	(Scotland) SCO	Bell	1	0	1	0	0	0
	FW	(Scotland) SCO	William Boyle	3	1	2	1	1	0
	FW	(Scotland) SCO	Hugh Craig	5	0	5	0	0	0
	FW	(Scotland) SCO	John Fraser	17	4	10	3	7	1
	FW	(Scotland) SCO	James Gracie	7	1	5	0	2	1
	FW	(Scotland) SCO	Hodge	1	0	1	0	0	0
	FW	(Scotland) SCO	Lewis Mackie	11	5	5	2	6	3
	FW	(Scotland) SCO	Hugh Mair	2	2	1	0	1	2
	FW	(Scotland) SCO	Henry Malloy	10	3	10	3	0	0
	FW	(Scotland) SCO	Hugh McIlhany	5	1	5	1	0	0
	FW	(Scotland) SCO	Thomas Reid	6	1	6	1	0	0
	FW	(Scotland) SCO	Albert Saunderson	23	2	16	2	7	0
	FW	(Scotland) SCO	John Seaton	3	0	2	0	1	0
	FW	(Scotland) SCO	Willie Speedie	8	2	3	1	5	1
	FW	(Scotland) SCO	William Thomson	19	4	12	1	7	3
	FW	(Scotland) SCO	Watson	4	0	4	0	0	0
	FW	(Scotland) SCO	Hugh Weir	3	0	3	0	0	0

== Reserve team ==
Dumbarton lost in the second round of the Scottish Second XI Cup to Rangers.
