= Robert Smellie =

Robert Smellie may refer to:

- Bob Smellie (1867–1951), Scottish footballer
- Robert Smellie (footballer) (1866–1941), Scottish footballer
- Robert Smellie (politician) (1923–2005), Canadian politician
- Robert Smellie (judge) (1930–2025), New Zealand judge
