= Billy Dunlop (Sunderland footballer) =

Scottish footballer

Personal information
- Full name: William Dunlop
- Date of birth: 16 August 1869
- Place of birth: Annbank, Scotland
- Date of death: 25 May 1960 (aged 90)
- Place of death: Tarbolton, Scotland
- Positions: Wing half; centre half

Senior career*
Years	Team	Apps	(Gls)
1888–1893	Annbank		
1893–1899	Sunderland	134	(6)
1899–1900	Rangers	6	(0)
1900	Partick Thistle	1	(0)
1900–1901	Annbank		
- * Club domestic league appearances and goals

William Dunlop (16 August 1869 – 25 May 1960) was a Scottish footballer who played in the English Football League for Sunderland and in the Scottish League for Rangers. He played as a half-back, either at wing half or in the centre.

== Career ==
Dunlop was born in Annbank, South Ayrshire, and played for his hometown club (taking part in a trial for the Scotland national team in 1890) before coming to England to sign for Sunderland at the start of 1893. He was the uncle (though only two years older) of his new club's star forward Jimmy Miller, while another former Annbank player, defender Robert Smellie, was also in the Sunderland side (he and Dunlop were teammates in the team's run to the quarter-finals of the 1891–92 Scottish Cup).

Dunlop made his debut for the Wearside club on 28 January 1893 in a 4–2 home win against The Wednesday, and played a few more games at the end of the 1892–93 season once the League title was secured. From the following season onwards he was a regular in the first team, contributing to their runners-up position in 1894 and third League championship in the 1894–95 season and making 146 appearances in League and FA Cup. He also played on the winning side in a post-season friendly match against Scottish champions Heart of Midlothian, dubbed by some the "1895 World Championship".

Dunlop returned to Scotland in 1899 to join Rangers, and played six Division One games in the 1899–1900 season – in each case covering for one of the regular half-backs, Neilly Gibson, Bobby Neil and Jacky Robertson – plus a few more games in other competitions, in a couple of which Jimmy Miller also played. He moved on to Partick Thistle in the summer of 1900 before returning to Annbank a few months later.
