= 1896–97 Scottish Cup =

Tournament details
- Country: Scotland

Final positions
- Champions: Rangers
- Runners-up: Dumbarton

The 1896–97 Scottish Cup was the 24th season of Scotland's most prestigious football knockout competition. The cup was won by Rangers when they beat Dumbarton (by then a lower division club, and playing in their last major final to date) in the final the second Hampden Park by a 5–1 scoreline to claim the trophy for the second time.

== Calendar ==
Round	First match date	Fixtures	Clubs
First round	9 January 1897	16	32 → 16
Second round	23 January 1897	8	16 → 8
Quarter-finals	13 February 1897	4	8 → 4
Semi-finals	13 March 1897	2	4 → 2
Final	20 March 1897	1	2 → 1

== First round ==
Home team	Score	Away team
Abercorn	4 – 0	Hurlford
Arthurlie	4 – 2	Celtic
Blantyre	5 – 0	Bathgate
Dumbarton	2 – 1	Raith Rovers
Duncrub Park	1 – 10	Hibernian
Dundee	7 – 1	Inverness Thistle
Falkirk	2 – 0	Orion
Heart of Midlothian	2 – 0	Clyde
Leith Athletic	5 – 1	Dunblane
Lochgelly United	1 – 2	King's Park
Greenock Morton	3 – 1	St Johnstone
Motherwell	3 – 3	Kilmarnock
Partick Thistle	2 – 4	Rangers
St Bernard's	2 – 1	Queen's Park
St Mirren	5 – 1	Renton
Third Lanark	8 – 1	Newton Stewart

=== First round replay ===
Home team	Score	Away team
Kilmarnock	5 – 2	Motherwell

== Second round ==
Home team	Score	Away team
Abercorn	4 –1	Blantyre
Arthurlie	0 – 2	Greenock Morton *
Dumbarton	4 – 4	Leith Athletic
Dundee	4 – 2	King's Park *
Kilmarnock	3 – 1	Falkirk *
Rangers	3 – 0	Hibernian
St Bernard's	5 – 0	St Mirren
Third Lanark	5 – 2	Heart of Midlothian

- Match Declared Void

== Second round replay ==
Home team	Score	Away team
Arthurlie	1 –5	Greenock Morton
Leith Athletic	3 – 3	Dumbarton
Dundee	5 – 0	King's Park
Kilmarnock	7 – 3	Falkirk

== Second round second replay ==
Home team	Score	Away team
Dumbarton	3 – 2	Leith Athletic

== Quarter-final ==
Home team	Score	Away team
Dumbarton	2 – 0	St Bernard's
Dundee	0 – 4	Rangers
Kilmarnock	3 – 1	Third Lanark
Greenock Morton	2 – 2	Abercorn

=== Quarter-final replay ===
Home team	Score	Away team
Abercorn	2 – 3	Greenock Morton

== Semi-finals ==
Home team	Score	Away team
Dumbarton	4 – 3	Kilmarnock
Greenock Morton	2 – 7	Rangers

== Final ==
20 March 1897

Rangers	5–1	Dumbarton
Millar 42' 74'; Hyslop 55'; McPherson 69'; A. Smith 71'		W. Thomson

Hampden Park
Attendance: 15,000

=== Teams ===
Rangers:
GK	Matthew Dickie
RB	Nicol Smith
LB	Jock Drummond
RH	Neilly Gibson
CH	Andrew McCreadie
LH	David Mitchell
OR	Tommy Low
IR	John McPherson
CF	Jimmy Millar
IL	Tommy Hyslop
OL	Alec Smith

Dumbarton:
GK	John Docherty
RB	Andrew Mauchlen
LB	Alex Miller
RH	John Gillan
CH	Daniel Thomson
LH	Albert Saunderson
OR	William Speedie
IR	Robert Hendry
CF	Lewis Mackie
IL	William Thomson
OL	Jack Fraser

== See also ==
- 1896–97 in Scottish football
