= Tommy McDermott =

Tommy McDermott may refer to:

- Tommy McDermott (footballer, born 1878) (1878–1961), Scottish footballer for Celtic, Everton, Dundee and Chelsea
- Tommy McDermott (footballer, born 2005), English footballer for Port Vale
