= Andrew McPherson =

Andrew McPherson may refer to:

- Andrew McPherson (RAF officer) (1918–1940), pilot with RAF Bomber Command in World War II
- Andrew McPherson (Australian footballer) (born 1999), Australian rules footballer
- Andrew McPherson (Scottish footballer) (1879–1944), Scottish footballer with Morton and Celtic
- Andrew McPherson, Canadian musician associated with the band Eccodek

== See also ==
- Andrew Macpherson (disambiguation)
