= 1896–97 in Scottish football =

Football in Scotland
- Season: 1896–97

1896–97 in Scottish football

Division One champions
- Heart of Midlothian

Division Two champions
- Partick Thistle

Scottish Cup winners
- Rangers

Scottish Junior Cup winners
- Strathclyde

Scotland national team
- 1897 BHC

The 1896–97 season of Scottish football was the 24th season of competitive football in Scotland and the seventh season of the Scottish Football League.

== League competitions ==
=== Scottish Division One ===
Hearts were champions of the Scottish Division One.

Pos	Team	Pld	W	D	L	GF	GA	GD	Pts	Qualification or relegation
1	Heart of Midlothian (C)	18	13	2	3	47	22	+25	28	Champions
2	Hibernian	18	12	2	4	50	20	+30	26	
3	Rangers	18	11	3	4	64	30	+34	25	
4	Celtic	18	10	4	4	42	18	+24	24	
5	Dundee	18	10	2	6	38	30	+8	22	
6	St Mirren	18	9	1	8	38	29	+9	19	
7	St Bernard's	18	7	0	11	32	40	−8	14	
8	Third Lanark	18	5	1	12	29	46	−17	11	
9	Clyde	18	4	0	14	27	65	−38	8	
10	Abercorn (R)	18	1	1	16	21	88	−67	3	Relegated to the 1897–98 Scottish Division Two

Source: statto.com
Rules for classification: Teams finish equal if level on points. Points system: 2 points for a win, 1 point for a draw, 0 points for a loss
(C) Champions; (R) Relegated

=== Scottish Division Two ===
Partick Thistle won the Scottish Division Two. Both Linthouse and Port Glasgow Athletic had four points deducted.

Pos	Team	Pld	W	D	L	GF	GA	GD	Pts	Promotion or relegation
1	Partick Thistle (C, P)	18	14	3	1	61	28	+33	31	Promoted to the 1897–98 Scottish First Division
2	Leith Athletic	18	13	1	4	55	27	+28	27	
3	Airdrieonians	18	10	1	7	49	39	+10	21	
3	Kilmarnock	18	10	1	7	44	33	+11	21	
5	Morton	18	7	2	9	38	40	−2	16	
6	Linthouse	18	8	2	8	44	53	−9	14 (Note: Linthouse were docked four points.)	
6	Renton	18	6	2	10	34	41	−7	14	
8	Motherwell	18	6	1	11	40	55	−15	13	
8	Port Glasgow Athletic	18	4	5	9	38	50	−12	13	
10	Dumbarton (R)	18	2	2	14	27	64	−37	6	Resigned (Note: Dumbarton resigned from the league at the end of the season.)

Source: statto.com
Rules for classification: Teams finish equal if level on points. Points system: 2 points for a win, 1 point for a draw, 0 points for a loss
(C) Champions; (P) Promoted; (R) Relegated

== Other honours ==
=== Cup honours ===
==== National ====
Competition	Winner	Score	Runner-up
Scottish Cup	Rangers	5 – 1	Dumbarton
Scottish Qualifying Cup	Kilmarnock	4 – 1	Motherwell
Scottish Junior Cup	Strathclyde	2 – 0 (Note: Replay ordered. First match was null and void.)	Dunfermline Juniors

==== County ====
Competition	Winner	Score	Runner-up
Aberdeenshire Cup	Orion	5 – 2	Victoria United
Ayrshire Cup	Kilmarnock Athletic	3 – 0 (Note: Replay needed.)	Kilmarnock
Border Cup	Selkirk	1 – 0	Vale of Leithen
Dumbartonshire Cup	Vale of Leven	3 – 2	Dumbarton
East of Scotland Shield	St Bernard's	3 – 2	Cowdenbeath
Fife Cup	Dunfermline Athletic	3 – 2	Clackmannan
Forfarshire Cup	Arbroath	5 – 2	Forfar Athletic
Glasgow Cup	Rangers	2 – 1	Celtic
Lanarkshire Cup	Airdrie	1 – 0	Wishaw Thistle
Linlithgowshire Cup	Armadale Volunteers	3 – 0	Broxburn Shamrock
North of Scotland Cup	Inverness Caledonian	2 – 1	Clachnacuddin
Perthshire Cup	Vale of Atholl	4 – 1	Dunblane
Renfrewshire Cup	St Mirren	1 – 0	Port Glasgow Athletic
Southern Counties Cup	6th GRV	8 – 0	St Cuthbert Wanderers
Stirlingshire Cup	East Stirlingshire	4 – 1	Stenhousemuir

=== Non-league honours ===
Highland League

Top three
Pos	Team	Pld	W	D	L	GF	GA	GD	Pts
1	Clachnacuddin	6	3	3	0	16	7	+9	9
2	Inverness Caledonian	6	3	2	1	13	8	+5	8
3	Inverness Thistle	6	1	2	3	13	15	−2	4

Source: RSSSF

Other Senior Leagues

Division	Winner
Ayrshire Combination	Ayr
Border League	Selkirk
Central League	Cowdenbeath
Midland League	Clackmannan
Northern League	Orion
Scottish Alliance	Third Lanark 'A'
Scottish Combination	Hearts 'A'

== Scotland national team ==
Date	Venue	Opponents	Score (Note: Scotland's score is shown first.)	Competition	Scotland scorer(s)
20 March 1897	Racecourse Ground, Wrexham (A)	Wales	2–2	BHC	John Ritchie, John Walker
27 March 1897	Ibrox Park, Glasgow	Ireland	5–1	BHC	John McPherson (2), Neil Gibson, Robert McColl, Alex King
3 April 1897	Crystal Palace, London	England	2–1	BHC	Tom Hyslop, James Millar

Scotland were winners of the 1897 British Home Championship.

Key:

- (H) = Home match
- (A) = Away match
- BHC = British Home Championship

Team	Pld	W	D	L	GF	GA	GD	Pts
Scotland (C)	3	2	1	0	9	4	+5	5
England	3	2	0	1	11	2	+9	4
Ireland	3	1	0	2	5	14	−9	2
Wales	3	0	1	2	5	10	−5	1

Rules for classification: 1) points. The points system worked as follows: 2 points for a win and 1 point for a draw.
(C) Champions

== Other national teams ==
=== Scottish League XI ===
Date	Venue	Opponents	Score (Note: Scottish League XI's score is shown first.)	Scotland scorer(s)
30 January	Solitude, Belfast (A)	(Northern Ireland) Irish League XI	2–0	Alex King (2)
24 April	Ibrox Park, Glasgow (H)	(England) Football League XI	3–0	Tommy Low, John McPherson (2)

== See also ==
- 1896–97 Rangers F.C. season
