= 1898–99 Celtic F.C. season =

Celtic
1898–99 season
- Manager: Willie Maley
- Stadium: Celtic Park
- Scottish First Division: 3rd
- Scottish Cup: Winners

1898–99 was Celtic's eleventh season of competitive football. They competed in the Scottish First Division.

Celtic won the Scottish Cup for the second time in the club's history, as they defeated Rangers 2-0 at Hampden Park. It was the club's sixth major domestic honour. It was also Dan Doyle's second and last season as captain.

Celtic won the Glasgow Charity Cup, 2-0 against Rangers.

== Competitions ==
=== Scottish First Division ===
==== League table ====
Pos	Team	Pld	W	D	L	GF	GA	GD	Pts	Qualification or relegation
1	Rangers (C)	18	18	0	0	79	18	+61	36	Champions
2	Heart of Midlothian	18	12	2	4	56	30	+26	26	
3	Celtic	18	11	2	5	51	33	+18	24	
4	Hibernian	18	10	3	5	42	43	−1	23	
5	St Mirren	18	8	4	6	46	32	+14	20	

Source: statto.com
Rules for classification: Teams finish equal if level on points. Points system: 2 points for a win, 1 point for a draw, 0 points for a loss
(C) Champions

==== Matches ====
20 August 1898 First Division	Celtic	2–1	Third Lanark	Glasgow
				Stadium: Celtic Park; Attendance: 17,000

27 August 1898 First Division	Clyde	0–0	Celtic	Glasgow
				Stadium: Shawfield Stadium; Attendance: 13,000

3 September 1898 First Division	Celtic	4–1	St Mirren	Glasgow
				Stadium: Celtic Park; Attendance: 10,000

10 September 1898 First Division	Hibernian	2–1	Celtic	Edinburgh
				Stadium: Easter Road; Attendance: 12,000

19 September 1898 First Division	Hearts	2–2	Celtic	Edinburgh
				Stadium: Tynecastle Park; Attendance: 13,500

24 September 1898 First Division	Celtic	0–4	Rangers	Glasgow
				Stadium: Celtic Park; Attendance: 44,868

26 September 1898 First Division	Celtic	1–2	Hibernian	Glasgow
				Stadium: Celtic Park; Attendance: 10,000

1 October 1898 First Division	St Mirren	4–0	Celtic	Paisley
				Stadium: St Mirren Park, Love Street; Attendance: 8,000

8 October 1898 First Division	Celtic	1–0	St Bernard's	Glasgow
				Stadium: Celtic Park; Attendance: 12,000

29 October 1898 First Division	St Bernard's	2–3	Celtic	Edinburgh
				Stadium: New Logie Green; Attendance: 2,000

5 November 1898 First Division	Celtic	9–2	Clyde	Glasgow
				Stadium: Celtic Park; Attendance: 5,000

19 November 1898 First Division	Dundee	1–4	Celtic	Dundee
				Stadium: Carolina Point; Attendance: 3,000

26 November 1898 First Division	Celtic	4–0	Partick Thistle	Glasgow
				Stadium: Celtic Park; Attendance: 2,500

3 December 1898 First Division	Partick Thistle	3–8	Celtic	Glasgow
				Stadium: Meadowside; Attendance: 3,000

17 December 1898 First Division	Celtic	3–2	Hearts	Glasgow
				Stadium: Celtic Park; Attendance: 6,000

31 December 1898 First Division	Third Lanark	2–4	Celtic	Glasgow
				Stadium: Cathkin Park; Attendance: 4,000

2 January 1899 First Division	Rangers	4–1	Celtic	Glasgow
				Stadium: Ibrox Park; Attendance: 30,000

7 January 1899 First Division	Celtic	4–1	Dundee	Glasgow
				Stadium: Celtic Park; Attendance: 800

=== Scottish Cup ===
14 January 1899 First round	6th GRV	1–8	Celtic	Dalbeattie

4 February 1899 Second round	Celtic	3–0	St Bernard's	Glasgow
				Stadium: Celtic Park; Attendance: 3,000

25 February 1899 Third round	Celtic	2–1	Queen's Park	Glasgow
				Stadium: Celtic Park; Attendance: 35,000

11 March 1899 Semi-final	Celtic	4–2	Port Glasgow Athletic	Glasgow
				Stadium: Celtic Park; Attendance: 9,000

22 April 1899 Final	Celtic	2–0	Rangers	Glasgow
				Stadium: Hampden Park; Attendance: 25,000
