= Peter Turnbull (footballer) =

Scottish footballer (1873–1942)

Personal information
- Full name: Peter Turnbull
- Date of birth: 30 December 1873
- Place of birth: Sanquhar, Scotland
- Date of death: 11 December 1942 (aged 68)
- Place of death: Hammersmith, England
- Position: Centre forward

Senior career*
Years	Team	Apps	(Gls)
1891–1893	Rangers	3	(1)
1893	Third Lanark	0	(0)
1893–1895	Burnley	46	(23)
1895	Bolton Wanderers	4	(5)
1895–1896	Blackburn Rovers	25	(7)
1896–1898	Rangers	16	(13)
1898	→ Blackburn Rovers (loan)	1	(0)
1898–1899	Millwall Athletic	19	(17)
1899–1901	Queens Park Rangers	22	(6)
1901–1902	Brentford	22	(16)
1902	Barrow		
1902	Tranmere Rovers		
Total		158	(88)
- * Club domestic league appearances and goals

Peter Turnbull (30 December 1873 – 11 December 1942) was a Scottish professional footballer who played as a centre forward, most notably in the Football League for Burnley and Blackburn Rovers and in the Scottish League for Rangers. Turnbull was described as having an "attitude problem towards authority", which caused his frequent moves between clubs.

== Career statistics ==
Appearances and goals by club, season and competition
Club	Season	League			National cup (Note: Includes Scottish Cup, FA Cup)		Other		Total	
Club	Season	Division	Apps	Goals	Apps	Goals	Apps	Goals	Apps	Goals
Rangers	1891–92	Scottish League	1	0	0	0	2 (Note: Appearances in Glasgow Merchants Charity Cup)	2	3	2
Rangers	1892–93	Scottish League	2	1	—		0	0	2	1
Rangers	Total		3	1	0	0	2	2	5	3
Third Lanark	1892–93	Scottish League	0	0	1	0	—		1	0
Burnley	1892–93	First Division	6	4	0	0	—		6	4
Burnley	1893–94	First Division	27	17	0	0	—		27	17
Burnley	1894–95	First Division	13	2	0	0	—		13	2
Burnley	Total		46	23	0	0	—		46	23
Bolton Wanderers	1894–95	First Division	4	5	0	0	—		4	5
Blackburn Rovers	1895–96	First Division	25	7	0	0	—		25	7
Rangers	1896–97	Scottish League Division One	11	10	0	0	3 (Note: Appearances in Glasgow Cup)	5	14	15
Rangers	1897–98	Scottish League Division One	4	3	1	0	1	0	6	3
Rangers	Total		18	14	1	0	6	7	25	21
Blackburn Rovers (loan)	1897–98	First Division	1	0	0	0	—		1	0
Blackburn Rovers (loan)	Total		26	7	0	0	—		26	7
Queens Park Rangers	1899–1900	Southern League First Division	19	6	6	7	—		25	13
Queens Park Rangers	1900–01	Southern League First Division	3	0	0	0	—		3	0
Queens Park Rangers	Total		22	6	6	7	—		28	13
Brentford	1900–01	Southern League Second Division	13	15	—		1 (Note: Appearance in Southern League promotion-relegation test match)	0	14	15
Brentford	1901–02	Southern League First Division	9	1	2	1	—		11	2
Brentford	Total		22	16	2	1	1	0	25	17
Career total			138	71	10	8	7	7	155	86

== Honours ==
Rangers

- Glasgow Cup: 1896–97

Brentford

- Southern League Second Division: 1900–01
