= Bill Cox (footballer) =

English footballer

Personal information
- Full name: William James Cox
- Date of birth: 1880
- Place of birth: Liverpool, England
- Date of death: 6 November 1915 (aged 35)
- Place of death: Birmingham, England
- Position: Centre forward

Senior career*
Years	Team	Apps	(Gls)
1901–1903	Rossendale United	28	(13)
1903–1904	Bury	4	(0)
1904–1905	Plymouth Argyle	14	(5)
1905	Leicester Fosse	3	(0)
- Accrington Stanley
- Oldham Athletic
1905	Preston North End	0	(0)
1906–1907	Dundee	31	(17)
1907	Heart of Midlothian	9	(6)
- Bradford Park Avenue
1908	Rossendale United	4	(0)
- * Club domestic league appearances and goals

William James Cox (1880 – 6 November 1915) was an English professional footballer who played as a centre forward in the Football League for Bury and Leicester Fosse.

== Personal life ==
Cox was the younger brother of England international forward Jack Cox. After retiring from football, he became a stonemason in Blackpool. Cox served as a private in the King's Own Royal Regiment (Lancaster) at Gallipoli during the First World War. During the campaign, he suffered a leg wound and contracted fatal dysentery. Cox died in hospital in Birmingham on 6 November 1915. He was buried in Layton Cemetery, Blackpool.

== Career statistics ==
Appearances and goals by club, season and competition
Club	Season	League			National Cup		Total	
Club	Season	Division	Apps	Goals	Apps	Goals	Apps	Goals
Plymouth Argyle	1904–05	Southern League First Division	14	5	0	0	14	5
Leicester Fosse	1904–05	Second Division	3	0	—		3	0
Dundee	1906–07	Scottish League First Division	31	17	3	3	34	20
Heart of Midlothian	1906–07	Scottish League First Division	1	2	—		1	2
Heart of Midlothian	1907–08	Scottish League First Division	8	4	0	0	8	4
Heart of Midlothian	Total		9	6	0	0	9	6
Career total			57	28	3	3	60	31
