= Andrew McPherson (Scottish footballer) =

Scottish footballer (1879–1944)

Personal information
- Full name: Andrew Forbes McPherson
- Date of birth: 22 September 1879
- Place of birth: Greenock, Scotland
- Date of death: 15 June 1944 (aged 64)
- Place of death: Greenock, Scotland
- Position: Goalkeeper

Senior career*
Years	Team	Apps	(Gls)
–	Morton Juniors		
1898–1902	Morton	73	(0)
1902–1906	Celtic	27	(0)
1904	→ Hibernian (loan)	1	(0)
1905	→ Stenhousemuir (loan)		
1906	→ Port Glasgow Athletic (loan)		
Total		101	(0)

International career
1902	Scottish League XI	1	(0)
- * Club domestic league appearances and goals

Andrew Forbes McPherson (22 September 1879 – 15 June 1944) was a Scottish footballer who played as a goalkeeper.

He began his career with hometown club Morton where he spent four years, helping them gain promotion from the lower division in 1899–1900 and continuing to impress in Scottish Division One, to the extent that he was selected for the Scottish League XI in February 1902. Two months later he signed for Celtic, moving to Glasgow in a swap deal involving Johnny Hodge, replacing Rab Macfarlane (coincidentally all three were from Greenock) who had moved to Middlesbrough. His first major test did not end well as Hibernian – who had already defeated Celtic in the 1902 Scottish Cup Final a few days earlier in Macfarlane's final appearance – scored five times in the first half of the Glasgow Merchants Charity Cup final, eventually winning 6–2. He conceded twice more in the British League Cup Final in June of that year, but this time his teammates outscored the opponents Rangers to win 3–2 and claim the trophy.

McPherson was installed as the regular Celtic goalkeeper for the 1902–03 season and played in all of the 22 Division One matches; however, the team only finished fifth in the table and lost 3–0 to Rangers in the early rounds of the Scottish Cup, and to Third Lanark in the Glasgow Cup final by the same scoreline. Minor success was had in the 'Ibrox Disaster Benefit Tournament' (beating Morton in the final) and the Charity Cup (defeating St Mirren) but McPherson had failed to convince overall. After a few appearances at the start of 1903–04, he was replaced by Davey Adams who would go on to great success with the club. At the end of that season, he had a short spell on loan at Hibernian, playing in one league match.

McPherson did not play for Celtic at all in the 1904–05 season, and was not paid by the club who had placed him on their 'open to transfer' list (meaning he was not wanted but could not sign for another club without a fee being paid). However, an administrative error had seen him also added to the list of 'retained players' (i.e. active and paid) at the beginning of the season, and in March 1905 McPherson successfully took court action against Celtic over unpaid wages for the year of inactivity, although the club appealed this on the basis that he never signed a registration form for the season and would have been aware that he could not play for them. Following the disputed period, he had spells at Stenhousemuir and Port Glasgow Athletic – these are listed as loans, indicating that Celtic did still hold his registration for at least a year after the court case. At Port Glasgow, Bob Ward was the regular goalkeeper before transferring to Sunderland; the player chosen to replace him ahead of McPherson was another future Celtic star, Charlie Shaw.
