= 1896–97 Scottish Football League =

Scottish football season

Statistics of the Scottish Football League in season 1896–97.

== Overview ==
Hearts were champions of the Scottish Division One.

Partick Thistle won the Scottish Division Two. Both Linthouse and Port Glasgow Athletic had four points deducted.

== Scottish League Division One ==
Pos	Team	Pld	W	D	L	GF	GA	GD	Pts	Qualification or relegation
1	Heart of Midlothian (C)	18	13	2	3	47	22	+25	28	Champions
2	Hibernian	18	12	2	4	50	20	+30	26	
3	Rangers	18	11	3	4	64	30	+34	25	
4	Celtic	18	10	4	4	42	18	+24	24	
5	Dundee	18	10	2	6	38	30	+8	22	
6	St Mirren	18	9	1	8	38	29	+9	19	
7	St Bernard's	18	7	0	11	32	40	−8	14	
8	Third Lanark	18	5	1	12	29	46	−17	11	
9	Clyde	18	4	0	14	27	65	−38	8	
10	Abercorn (R)	18	1	1	16	21	88	−67	3	Relegated to the 1897–98 Scottish Division Two

Source: statto.com
Rules for classification: Teams finish equal if level on points. Points system: 2 points for a win, 1 point for a draw, 0 points for a loss
(C) Champions; (R) Relegated

== Scottish League Division Two ==
Pos	Team	Pld	W	D	L	GF	GA	GD	Pts	Promotion or relegation
1	Partick Thistle (C, P)	18	14	3	1	61	28	+33	31	Promoted to the 1897–98 Scottish First Division
2	Leith Athletic	18	13	1	4	55	27	+28	27	
3	Airdrieonians	18	10	1	7	49	39	+10	21	
3	Kilmarnock	18	10	1	7	44	33	+11	21	
5	Morton	18	7	2	9	38	40	−2	16	
6	Linthouse	18	8	2	8	44	53	−9	14 (Note: Linthouse were docked four points.)	
6	Renton	18	6	2	10	34	41	−7	14	
8	Motherwell	18	6	1	11	40	55	−15	13	
8	Port Glasgow Athletic	18	4	5	9	38	50	−12	13	
10	Dumbarton (R)	18	2	2	14	27	64	−37	6	Resigned (Note: Dumbarton resigned from the league at the end of the season.)

Source: statto.com
Rules for classification: Teams finish equal if level on points. Points system: 2 points for a win, 1 point for a draw, 0 points for a loss
(C) Champions; (P) Promoted; (R) Relegated

== See also ==
- 1896–97 in Scottish football
