= John Halkett (footballer) =

Scottish footballer

Personal information
- Full name: John Halkett
- Place of birth: Scotland
- Position: Outside left

Senior career*
Years	Team	Apps	(Gls)
1899–1905	Dundee	7	(0)
- * Club domestic league appearances and goals

John Halkett was a Scottish footballer who played in the Scottish League for Dundee as an outside left.

== Personal life ==
Halkett's younger brother Alex was also a footballer.

== Career statistics ==
Appearances and goals by club, season and competition
Club	Season	League			Scottish Cup		Total	
Club	Season	Division	Apps	Goals	Apps	Goals	Apps	Goals
Dundee	1899–1900	Scottish Division One	1	0	1	0	2	0
Dundee	1901–02	Scottish Division One	6	0	0	0	6	0
Career total			7	0	1	0	8	0
