= Andrew Macpherson =

Andrew Macpherson may refer to:

- Andy Macpherson, Scottish rugby union referee
- Andrew Gordon Macpherson, Canadian film and television composer
- Andrew Macpherson (racing driver) in 2011 Australian GT Championship season
- Andy Macpherson (studio owner), owner of Revolution Recording Studios, where First Offense was recorded

== See also ==
- Andrew McPherson (disambiguation)
