= Jimmy Gibson (footballer, born 1901) =

Scottish footballer

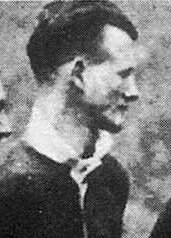
- Gibson prior to the 'Wembley Wizards match, 1928

Personal information
- Full name: James Davidson Gibson
- Date of birth: 12 June 1901
- Place of birth: Larkhall, Scotland
- Date of death: 1 January 1978 (aged 76)
- Place of death: Birmingham, England
- Positions: Right half; centre-half

Youth career
- Morning Star

Senior career*
Years	Team	Apps	(Gls)
–	Larkhall Thistle		
–	Kirkintilloch Rob Roy		
–	Ashfield		
1921–1927	Partick Thistle	168	(44)
1927–1936	Aston Villa	215	(10)
Total		383	(54)

International career
1925–1927	Scottish Football League XI	2	(0)
1926–1930	Scotland	8	(1)
- * Club domestic league appearances and goals

James Davidson Gibson (12 June 1901 – 1 January 1978) was a Scottish footballer who played for Kirkintilloch Rob Roy, Ashfield, Partick Thistle and Aston Villa. His career spanned 19 years, from 1917 to 1936.

== Career ==
Gibson played right-half and was regarded as one of the best players in that position at that time. He played almost 200 games for Partick before a transfer to Aston Villa for a then-record fee of £7,500. He made 227 appearances for Aston Villa, during which time they were runners-up in the Football League twice (1930–31 and 1932–33) but were relegated in his final season with the club, 1935–36.

He was capped eight times by Scotland; The highlight of his career was when he partnered Jimmy McMullan (his former Partick Thistle teammate) in the dominant Scottish midfield of the "Wembley Wizards" that defeated England 5–1 in 1928. He also played twice for the Scottish Football League XI.

== Personal life ==
His father Neilly Gibson was also a Scottish international, who too played for Partick Thistle though mainly for Rangers, while brothers Neil and Willie were also footballers.
