= 1897–98 in Scottish football =

Football in Scotland
- Season: 1897–98

1897–98 in Scottish football

Division One champions
- Celtic

Division Two champions
- Kilmarnock

Scottish Cup winners
- Rangers

Junior Cup winners
- Dalziel Rovers

Scotland national team
- 1898 BHC

The season of 1897–98 in Scottish football was the 25th season of competitive football in Scotland and the eighth season of the Scottish Football League.

== League competitions ==
=== Scottish Division One ===
Celtic are champions of the Scottish Division One.

Pos	Team	Pld	W	D	L	GF	GA	GD	Pts	Qualification or relegation
1	Celtic (C)	18	15	3	0	56	13	+43	33	Champions
2	Rangers	18	13	3	2	71	15	+56	29	
3	Hibernian	18	10	2	6	47	29	+18	22	
4	Heart of Midlothian	18	8	4	6	54	33	+21	20	
5	St Mirren	18	8	2	8	30	36	−6	18	
5	Third Lanark	18	8	2	8	37	38	−1	18	
7	Dundee	18	5	3	10	29	36	−7	13 (Note: Dundee and Partick Thistle finished level on points but Dundee won a play-off match to determine ranking positions.)	
8	Partick Thistle	18	6	1	11	34	64	−30	13	
9	St Bernard's	18	4	1	13	35	67	−32	9	
10	Clyde	18	1	3	14	21	83	−62	5	

Source: statto.com
Rules for classification: Teams finish equal if level on points. Points system: 2 points for a win, 1 point for a draw, 0 points for a loss
(C) Champions

=== Scottish Division Two ===
Kilmarnock won the Scottish Division Two but were not promoted.

Pos	Team	Pld	W	D	L	GF	GA	GD	Pts	Qualification or relegation
1	Kilmarnock (C)	18	14	1	3	64	29	+35	29	
2	Port Glasgow Athletic	18	12	1	5	66	36	+30	25	
3	Morton	18	9	4	5	47	38	+9	22	
4	Leith Athletic	18	9	2	7	40	39	+1	20	
5	Abercorn	18	6	4	8	33	41	−8	16	
5	Ayr	18	7	2	9	36	43	−7	16	
5	Linthouse	18	6	4	8	38	39	−1	16	
8	Airdrieonians	18	6	2	10	45	56	−11	14	
9	Hamilton Academical	14	5	2	7	26	32	−6	12 (Note: Hamilton Academical took Renton's place in the league and fulfilled the club's remaining fixtures.)	
10	Motherwell	18	3	4	11	31	56	−25	10	
-	Renton (R)	4	0	0	4	2	19	−17	0	Resigned (Note: Renton resigned after playing four games.)

Source: statto.com
Rules for classification: Teams finish equal if level on points. Points system: 2 points for a win, 1 point for a draw, 0 points for a loss
(C) Champions; (R) Relegated

== Other honours ==
=== Cup honours ===
==== National ====
Competition	Winner	Score	Runner-up
Scottish Cup	Rangers	2 – 0	Kilmarnock
Scottish Qualifying Cup	Port Glasgow Athletic	4 – 1	East Stirlingshire
Scottish Junior Cup	Dalziel Rovers	2 – 1	Parkhead

==== County ====
Competition	Winner	Score	Runner-up
Aberdeenshire Cup	Aberdeen	3 – 2	Orion
Ayrshire Cup	Kilmarnock	9 – 3	Galston
Border Cup	Peebles Rovers	4 – 3	Kelso
Dumbartonshire Cup	Dumbarton	3 – 2	Vale of Leven
East of Scotland Shield	Hearts	2 – 0 (Note: Replay needed.)	Leith Athletic
Fife Cup	Raith Rovers	3 – 1	Alloa Athletic
Forfarshire Cup	Dundee Wanderers	7 – 5	Arbroath
Glasgow Cup	Rangers	4 – 0	Queen's Park
Lanarkshire Cup	Airdrie	3 – 2	Motherwell
Linlithgowshire Cup	Bo'ness	3 – 0	Armadale Volunteers
North of Scotland Cup	Clachnacuddin	12 – 1	Inverness Citadel
Perthshire Cup	Fair City Athletic	3 – 2	Rob Roy
Renfrewshire Cup	St Mirren	2 – 0	Port Glasgow Athletic
Southern Counties Cup	Dumfries	2 – 1	Dumfries Hibs
Stirlingshire Cup	Camelon	6 – 5	Falkirk

=== Non-league honours ===
Highland League

Top three
Pos	Team	Pld	W	D	L	GF	GA	GD	Pts
1	Clachnacuddin	16	15	1	0	74	8	+66	31
2	Inverness Caledonian	16	13	1	2	49	20	+29	27
3	Elgin City	13	8	2	3	44	30	+14	18

Source: RSSSF

Other Senior Leagues

Division	Winner
Border League	Selkirk
Central League	unfinished
Central Combination	East Stirlingshire
Northern League	Victoria United
Perthshire League	Scone
Scottish Combination	Rangers 'A'
Southern Counties League	unfinished

== Scotland national team ==
Date	Venue	Opponents	Score (Note: Scotland's score is shown first.)	Competition	Scotland scorer(s)
19 March	Fir Park, Motherwell (H)	Wales	5–2	BHC	James Gillespie (3), James McKee (2)
26 March	Solitude Ground, Belfast (A)	Ireland	3–0	BHC	Thomas Robertson, Robert Smyth McColl, William Stewart
2 April	Celtic Park, Glasgow (H)	England	1–3	BHC	James Millar

Key:

- (A) = Away match
- (H) = Home match
- BHC = British Home Championship

Team	Pld	W	D	L	GF	GA	GD	Pts
England (C)	3	3	0	0	9	3	+6	6
Scotland	3	2	0	1	9	5	+4	4
Ireland	3	1	0	2	3	6	−3	2
Wales	3	0	0	3	2	9	−7	0

Rules for classification: 1) points. The points system worked as follows: 2 points for a win and 1 point for a draw.
(C) Champions

== Other national teams ==
=== Scottish League XI ===
Date	Venue	Opponents	Score (Note: Scottish League XI's score is shown first.)	Scotland scorer(s)
29 January	Carolina Port, Dundee (H)	(Northern Ireland) Irish League XI	5–0	Hugh Morgan, Bernard Breslin, Robert Hamilton (2), James Gillespie
9 April	Villa Park, Birmingham (A)	(England) Football League XI	2–1	Robert Hamilton (2)

== See also ==
- 1897–98 Rangers F.C. season
