= David McPherson (footballer) =

Scottish footballer

Personal information
- Full name: David Murray McPherson
- Date of birth: 22 August 1872
- Place of birth: Kilmarnock, Scotland
- Date of death: 24 July 1942 (aged 69)
- Place of death: Kilmarnock, Scotland
- Positions: Wing half; inside forward

Senior career*
Years	Team	Apps	(Gls)
1890–1892	Kilmarnock		
1892–1893	Rangers	10	(1)
1893–1904	Kilmarnock	155	(20)
Total		165	(21)

International career
1892	Scotland	1	(0)
1892	Scottish Alliance XI	1	(0)
- * Club domestic league appearances and goals

David Murray McPherson (22 August 1872 – 24 July 1942) was a Scottish footballer who played as a wing half.

== Career ==
Born in Kilmarnock, McPherson played club football for Kilmarnock and Rangers, and made one appearance for Scotland in 1892.

His older brother John was also a Kilmarnock and Rangers player (they played on opposite sides in the 1898 Scottish Cup Final) and a Scotland international, and several other family members were also involved in football (though not as many as claimed in some reports which erroneously connect his family to another set of sporting McPhersons from Kilmarnock).

== See also ==
- List of Scottish football families
