= Willie Gibson (footballer, born 1898) =

Scottish footballer (1898–1992)

Personal information
- Full name: William Muir Gibson
- Date of birth: 21 July 1898
- Place of birth: Larkhall, Scotland
- Date of death: 1992 (aged 93–94)
- Height: 5 ft 8 1/2 in (1.74 m)
- Position: Left half

Senior career*
| Years | Team | Apps | (Gls) |
- Larkhall Thistle
- St Anthony's
| 1919–1923 | Ayr United | 118 | (4) |
| 1923–1929 | Newcastle United | 124 | (2) |
- * Club domestic league appearances and goals

William Muir Gibson (21 July 1898 – 1992) was a Scottish professional footballer who played as a left half.

== Career ==
Born in Larkhall, Gibson played for Ayr United, before moving to Newcastle United, where he made over 120 appearances in the English Football League.

Gibson was trainer of Queen's Park from 1946 until 1963.

== Personal life ==
His father Neilly and brothers Neil and James were also footballers.

== Honours ==
Newcastle United

- FA Cup: 1923–24
