= 1893–94 Scottish Cup =

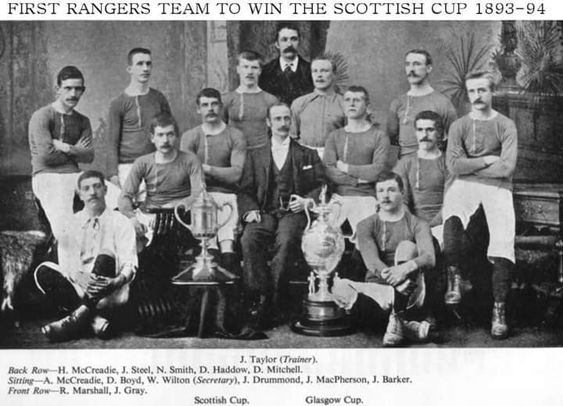
- Team photo of the winning Rangers team

Tournament details
- Country: Scotland

Final positions
- Champions: Rangers
- Runners-up: Celtic

The 1893–94 Scottish Cup was the 21st season of Scotland's most prestigious football knockout competition. The Cup was won by Rangers when they beat Celtic 3–1 in the final. It was the first Scottish Cup final between the two Glasgow clubs, whose dominance of the domestic game and 'old firm' rivalry were yet to be established – indeed this was the first time Rangers lifted the trophy in their third appearance at that stage (and their first since the 1870s); for Celtic it was a third defeat in four finals, all within the past six years.

== Calendar ==
Round	First match date	Fixtures	Clubs
First round	25 November 1893	16	32 → 16
Second round	16 December 1893	8	16 → 8
Quarter-finals	13 January 1894	4	8 → 4
Semi-finals	3 February 1894	2	4 → 2
Final	10 February 1894	1	2 → 1

== Teams ==
Competing teams
Clubs exempt from preliminary rounds	Clubs qualified via preliminary rounds
Abercorn; Broxburn Shamrock; Celtic; Clyde; Dumbarton; Heart of Midlothian; King's Park; Leith Athletic; Linthouse; Queen's Park; Rangers; Renton; St Bernard's; St Mirren; Thistle; 3rd Lanark RV	Airdrieonians; Albion Rovers; Arbroath; Battlefield; Black Watch; Cambuslang; Cowlairs; East Stirlingshire; Grangemouth; Hurlford; Inverness Thistle; Kilmarnock; Orion; Port Glasgow Athletic; Vale of Leven; 5th Kirkcudbright RV

== First round ==
First round results
Date	Home team	Score	Away team	Venue
25 November 1893	3rd Lanark RV	9–3	Inverness Thistle	Cathkin Park, Glasgow
25 November 1893	Grangemouth	1–7	Renton	Caledonian Park, Grangemouth
25 November 1893	Cambuslang	3–2	East Stirlingshire	Whitefield Park, Cambuslang
25 November 1893	St Mirren	1–0	Heart of Midlothian	Westmarch, Paisley
25 November 1893	Abercorn	2–1	5th Kirkcudbright RV	Underwood Park, Paisley
25 November 1893	Kilmarnock	1–3	St Bernard's	Rugby Park, Kilmarnock
25 November 1893	Albion Rovers	6–0	Black Watch	Meadow Park, Coatbridge
25 November 1893	King's Park	2–5	Clyde	Forthbank Park, Stirling
25 November 1893	Linthouse	1–5	Queen's Park	Langlands Park, Govan
25 November 1893	Thistle	1–3	Battlefield	Braehead Park, Glasgow
25 November 1893	Rangers	8–0	Cowlairs	Ibrox Park, Govan
25 November 1893	Orion	2–11	Leith Athletic	Cattofield, Aberdeen
25 November 1893	Celtic	6–0	Hurlford	Celtic Park, Glasgow
25 November 1893	Vale of Leven	1–2	Dumbarton	Millburn Park, Alexandria
25 November 1893	Broxburn Shamrock	3–8	Arbroath	Shamrock Park, Broxburn
25 November 1893	Port Glasgow Athletic	7–5	Airdrieonians	Clune Park, Port Glasgow

== Second round ==
Second round results
Date	Home team	Score	Away team	Venue
16 December 1893	Clyde	6–0	Cambuslang	Barrowfield Park, Glasgow
16 December 1893	Arbroath	0–3	Queen's Park	Gayfield Park, Arbroath
16 December 1893	Battlefield	3–3	Abercorn	Mossfield Park, Glasgow
16 December 1893	Rangers	2–0	Leith Athletic	Ibrox Park, Govan
16 December 1893	Dumbarton	1–3	St Bernard's	Boghead Park, Dumbarton
16 December 1893	Renton	2–2 (protested) (Note: A protest by Renton was upheld and a replay was ordered.)	Port Glasgow Athletic	Tontine Park, Renton
16 December 1893	3rd Lanark RV	3–2	St Mirren	Cathkin Park, Glasgow
16 December 1893	Celtic	7–0	Albion Rovers	Celtic Park, Glasgow

Second round replays
Date	Home team	Score	Away team	Venue
23 December 1893	Abercorn	3–0	Battlefield	Underwood Park, Paisley
23 December 1893	Renton	1–3	Port Glasgow Athletic	Tontine Park, Renton

== Quarter-final ==
Quarter-final results
Date	Home team	Score	Away team	Venue
13 January 1894	3rd Lanark RV	2–1	Port Glasgow	Cathkin Park, Glasgow
13 January 1894	Abercorn	3–3	Queen's Park	Underwood Park, Paisley
13 January 1894	Clyde	0–5	Rangers	Barrowfield Park, Glasgow
13 January 1894	Celtic	8–1	St Bernard's	Celtic Park, Glasgow

Quarter-final replay
Date	Home team	Score	Away team	Venue
20 January 1894	Queen's Park	3–3	Abercorn	Hampden Park, Glasgow

Quarter-final second replay
Date	Home team	Score	Away team	Venue
27 January 1894	Abercorn	0–2	Queen's Park	Ibrox Park, Govan (Note: Match played at a neutral venue.)

== Semi-finals ==
Semi-final results
Date	Home team	Score	Away team	Venue
3 February 1894	Rangers	1–1	Queen's Park	Ibrox Park, Govan
3 February 1894	3rd Lanark RV	3–5	Celtic	Cathkin Park, Glasgow

Semi-final replay
Date	Home team	Score	Away team	Venue
10 February 1894	Queen's Park	1–3	Rangers	Hampden Park, Glasgow

== Final ==
17 February 1894

Rangers	3–1	Celtic
H. McCreadie 55'; Barker 65'; McPherson 68'		Maley

Hampden Park
Attendance: 17,000
Referee: J. Marshall

=== Teams ===
Celtic:
GK	Joseph Cullen
RB	Jerry Reynolds
LB	Dan Doyle
RH	Willie Maley
CH	James Kelly
LH	John Curran
OR	Jake Madden
IR	James Blessington
CF	Joe Cassidy
IL	Sandy McMahon
OL	John Campbell

Rangers:
GK	David Haddow
RB	Nicol Smith
LB	Jock Drummond
RH	Robert Marshall
CH	Andrew McCreadie
LH	David Mitchell
OR	James Steel
IR	Hugh McCreadie
CF	John Gray
IL	John McPherson
OL	John Barker
