= Neil Gibson (footballer, born 1899) =

Scottish footballer

Personal information
- Date of birth: 1899
- Place of birth: Larkhall, Scotland
- Date of death: 1974 (aged 74–75)
- Place of death: Larkhall, Scotland
- Height: 5 ft 11 1/2 in (1.82 m)
- Position: Centre half

Senior career*
| Years | Team | Apps | (Gls) |
| – | Ashfield | | |
| 1921–1922 | Partick Thistle | 1 | (0) |
| 1922–1923 | Queen of the South | | |
| 1923 | Royal Albert | 11 | (2) |
| 1923–1933 | Clyde | 278 | (20) |
| Total | | 290 | (22) |
- * Club domestic league appearances and goals

Neil Gibson (1899 – 1974) was a Scottish footballer who played as a centre half, primarily for Clyde. He scored the goal which won the Glasgow Cup for the club in the 1925–26 season (with a win over Celtic at their own ground), and in 1929 was selected to play for the Glasgow FA select team in their annual match against the Sheffield FA.

His father Neilly Gibson and younger brother Jimmy both played for the Scotland national team and at club level with teams including Partick Thistle (where Neil had a short spell as a young player), while elder brother Willie also played professionally with Newcastle United.
