= Tommy Dilly =

Scottish footballer

Personal information
- Full name: Thomas Dilly
- Date of birth: 22 April 1880
- Place of birth: Arbroath, Scotland
- Date of death: 1953 (aged 72–73)
- Position: Winger

Senior career*
Years	Team	Apps	(Gls)
1899	Arbroath North End		
1899–1900	Arbroath		
1900	Forfarshire County		
1900–1902	Arbroath		
1902–1906	Everton	9	(2)
1906–1907	West Bromwich Albion	30	(9)
1907–1908	Derby County	10	(2)
1908–1909	Bradford (Park Avenue)	1	(0)
1909–1910	Walsall		
1910–1911	Shrewsbury Town		
1911–1914	Worcester City		
1914	Kidderminster Harriers		
Total		50	(13)
- * Club domestic league appearances and goals

Thomas Dilly (22 April 1880 – 1953) was a Scottish footballer who played in the Football League for Bradford (Park Avenue), Derby County, Everton and West Bromwich Albion.
