= Jock Ditchburn =

English footballer

Personal information
- Full name: John Hurst Ditchburn
- Date of birth: 13 March 1897
- Place of birth: Leeds, England
- Date of death: January 1992 (aged 94)
- Place of death: Exeter, England
- Position: Wing half

Senior career*
Years	Team	Apps	(Gls)
1920–1921	Blantyre Thistle		
1921–1922	Cambuslang Rangers		
1922–1923	Blantyre Victoria		
1923–1926	Sunderland	6	(0)
1926–1928	Exeter City	51	(0)
1928–1929	Exeter Loco		
1929–1932	Exeter City	34	(0)
- * Club domestic league appearances and goals

John Hurst Ditchburn (13 March 1897 – January 1992) was an English professional footballer who played as a wing half in the Football League for Sunderland and Exeter City. He was born in Leeds and settled in Exeter, but had spent most of his childhood in Cambuslang, Scotland and began his career with local clubs.
