= Billy Howden =

Scottish footballer (1879–1937)

Personal information
- Full name: William Howden
- Date of birth: 11 November 1879
- Place of birth: Barrhead, Renfrewshire, Scotland
- Date of death: 27 January 1937 (aged 57)
- Place of death: Ontario, Canada
- Position: Goalkeeper

Senior career*
Years	Team	Apps	(Gls)
- Benburb
- Rutherglen Glencairn
1899–1901	Rangers	1	(0)
1901–1912	Partick Thistle	162	(0)
1908–1909	→ Abercorn (loan)	14	(0)
1911–1912	→ Abercorn (loan)	22	(0)
1912–1913	Abercorn	25	(0)
Total		224	(0)

International career
1905	Scotland	1	(0)
- * Club domestic league appearances and goals

William Howden (11 November 1879 – 27 January 1937) was a Scottish footballer who played as a goalkeeper.

== Career ==
Howden played club football for Rutherglen Glencairn, Rangers, Partick Thistle (where he made 233 appearances in all competitions) and Abercorn.

He was capped for Scotland once, playing in a 4–0 win against Ireland in 1905.
