= Bob Ward (footballer) =

Scottish footballer

Personal information
- Full name: Robert Ward
- Date of birth: 1881
- Place of birth: Glasgow, Scotland
- Height: 5 ft 8 in (1.73 m)
- Position: Goalkeeper

Senior career*
Years	Team	Apps	(Gls)
1895–1897	Port Glasgow Athletic	22	(0)
1897–1898	Abercorn	11	(0)
1898–1906	Port Glasgow Athletic	169	(0)
1906–1908	Sunderland	48	(0)
1908–1909	Bradford (Park Avenue)	7	(0)
1909–19??	Marsden Rescue		
- * Club domestic league appearances and goals

Robert Ward (born 1881) was a Scottish professional footballer who played as a goalkeeper for clubs including Sunderland.
