= Tommy Hyslop =

Scottish footballer (1871–1936)

Personal information
- Full name: Bryce Thomas Scouller
- Date of birth: 20 August 1871
- Place of birth: Auchinleck, Scotland
- Date of death: 21 April 1936 (aged 64)
- Place of death: Paisley, Scotland
- Position: Forward

Senior career*
Years	Team	Apps	(Gls)
1889	Elderslie		
1890–1892	2nd Scots Guards		
1892	Millwall Athletic		
1893–1894	Sunderland	19	(10)
1894–1896	Stoke	33	(24)
1896–1898	Rangers	30	(23)
1898–1899	Stoke	12	(0)
1899–1900	Rangers	5	(3)
1900–1902	Partick Thistle	14	(6)
1902–1903	Dundee Wanderers		
1903–1904	Johnstone		
1904–1906	Abercorn	17	(2)
1906–1907	Philadelphia Thistle		
1907	Tacony Philadelphia		
Total		120	(68)

International career
1896–1897	Scotland	2	(1)
- * Club domestic league appearances and goals

Bryce Thomas Scouller, known by his sporting name Thomas Hyslop (20 August 1871 – 21 April 1936) was a Scottish footballer who played in the Football League for Stoke City and Sunderland He also played for Sunderland and Rangers.

He represented the Scotland national team, playing twice against England in 1896 and in 1897, scoring on his debut. He was one of a group of five men who were the first to be selected while playing for an English club, and also the first Stoke player to be capped by Scotland.

== Career ==
Hyslop was born as Bryce Scouller in Ayrshire but grew up in Elderslie, Renfrewshire; he began his career with Elderslie and also played football whilst serving with the Royal Scots. He moved to England and joined Millwall Athletic (using the pseudonym Tommy Hyslop – his middle name and his mother's maiden name– to escape his military connections) before joining Football League side Sunderland in 1893. He spent one season at Sunderland and joined a struggling Stoke side in March 1894.

Hyslop, as he was now known in football circles, made an instant impact at Stoke scoring seven goals in the final six matches of the 1894–95 season to move Stoke away from the foot of the table. In 1895–96 he finished top scorer with 21 goals to his name and at the end of the campaign he returned to Scotland with Rangers, where he won the Glasgow Merchants Charity Cup, Scottish Cup and Glasgow Cup in 1896–97 and retained the latter two trophies the following season.

He made a short unsuccessful return to Stoke in 1898 before continuing his career in Scotland. He later moved to Canada, where he used his birth name but supplied a false age enabling him to enlist in the Canadian Expeditionary Force during World War I, and also played football in the United States before returning to Scotland. He died in Paisley in 1936.

== Career statistics ==
=== Club ===
Appearances and goals by club, season and competition
Club	Season	League			FA Cup		Other		Total	
Club	Season	Division	Apps	Goals	Apps	Goals	Apps	Goals	Apps	Goals
Sunderland	1893–94	First Division	19	10	0	0	0	0	19	10
Stoke	1894–95	First Division	6	7	0	0	1	0	7	7
Stoke	1895–96	First Division	27	17	3	4	0	0	30	21
Rangers	1895–96	Scottish Division One	0	0	0	0	1	0	1	0
Rangers	1896–97	Scottish Division One	17	10	5	5	12	9	34	24
Rangers	1897–98	Scottish Division One	13	13	2	0	6	4	21	17
Stoke	1898–99	First Division	12	0	0	0	0	0	12	0
Rangers	1898–99	Scottish Division One	0	0	0	0	1	2	1	2
Rangers	1899–1900	Scottish Division One	5	3	1	1	7	1	13	5
Career total			99	60	11	10	28	16	138	86

=== International ===
National team	Year	Apps	Goals
Scotland	1896	1	0
Scotland	1897	1	1
Total		2	1

=== International goals ===
Scores and results list Scotland's goal tally first.

#	Date	Venue	Opponent	Score	Result	Competition
1	3 April 1897	London, England	England	1–1	2–1	Friendly
