= Bob Smellie =

Scottish footballer

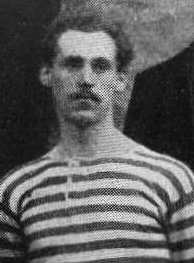

Personal information
- Full name: Robert Smellie
- Date of birth: 22 December 1867
- Place of birth: Blantyre, Scotland
- Date of death: 14 October 1951 (aged 83)
- Place of death: East Kilbride, Scotland
- Position: Left back

Youth career
- Clydesdale Colts

Senior career*
Years	Team	Apps	(Gls)
1884–1885	Hamilton Academical		
1885–1895	Queen's Park		
1895	Motherwell		
1896	St Bernard's		
1903	Hamilton Academical	1	(0)

International career
1887–1893	Scotland	6	(0)
- * Club domestic league appearances and goals

Robert Smellie (22 December 1867 – 14 October 1951) was a Scottish footballer who played for Hamilton Academical, Queen's Park, Motherwell, St Bernard's, Corinthian and Scotland, as a left back. He was a Scottish Cup winner with Queen's Park in 1890 and 1893. He was later the Queen's Park club president; away from football he was an auctioneer in the farming industry, working in a family business which continued into the 21st century.

His career has sometimes erroneously included details of another player of the same name who played in the same position for Annbank, Sunderland and Walsall Town Swifts in the mid-1890s, possibly based on the fact that as an amateur he was able to move fairly freely between different clubs. However, that did not apply to professional Football League clubs in England, and evidence such as both men playing matches for different clubs on the same day shows them to be separate people.

== See also ==
- List of Queen's Park F.C. international players
- List of Scotland national football team captains
