= George Davies (footballer, born 1897) =

English footballer

Personal information
- Full name: George Albert Davies
- Date of birth: 19 January 1897
- Place of birth: Prescot, England
- Date of death: 1956 (aged 58–59)
- Height: 5 ft 7 in (1.70 m)
- Position: Wing half

Senior career*
Years	Team	Apps	(Gls)
1919–1920	Prescot Cables		
1920–1922	Hull City	11	(0)
1922–1923	Merthyr Town	18	(0)
1923–1925	Grimsby Town	12	(1)
1925–1926	Whiston		
1926–1927	Llandudno		
1927–1928	Caernarvon Athletic		
1928–1929	Ashton National		
1929–19??	Northwich Victoria		
- * Club domestic league appearances and goals

George Albert Davies (19 January 1897 – 1956) was an English professional footballer who played as a wing half.
