= Robert Smillie (footballer) =

Scottish footballer (born 1866)

Personal information
- Date of birth: 9 November 1866
- Place of birth: Annbank, Scotland
- Date of death: 13 August 1941 (aged 74)
- Place of death: Annbank, Scotland
- Position: Left back

Senior career*
Years	Team	Apps	(Gls)
–	Annbank		
1892–1893	Sunderland	22	(0)
1893–1894	Walsall Town Swifts	14	(0)
- * Club domestic league appearances and goals

Robert Smillie (also spelled Smellie, 9 November 1866 – 13 August 1941) was a Scottish footballer who played as a left back.

Smillie initially played for hometown team Annbank where he was in the side that reached the quarter-finals of the 1891–92 Scottish Cup and won the Ayrshire Cup in the same year. After signing for reigning English Football League champions Sunderland who were seeking to replace defensive players Donald Gow, John Oliver and John Murray who had all moved on, Smillie helped the Wearsiders retain their title in the 1892–93 season as one of almost an entire team of Scots including former Annbank teammate Billy Dunlop, and Jimmy Millar who had also played for that club and with whom Smillie shared lodgings. However, despite their collective success, it was felt they were stronger in attack than defence and by the end of the campaign he had fallen out of favour and was not retained; Peter Meehan was brought in as a replacement and Donald Gow later also returned to the club.

Smillie moved on to second-tier Walsall Town Swifts where he played for one season against the likes of Manchester City (in their final season of being known as Ardwick), Liverpool and Newcastle United, leaving a match against the latter in December 1893 with an injury which may have been significant as it was his last appearance for Walsall. He subsequently returned to coal mining in the Annbank area.

He has often been confused with the better-known Bob Smellie of Queen's Park who was a Scotland international in the same era, playing in the same position (circumstantial evidence, and more significantly reports listing both men playing matches for different clubs on the same day, has shown them to be two different people).
