= George Anderson (footballer, born 1877) =

Scottish footballer

Personal information
- Date of birth: 6 January 1877
- Place of birth: Kilmarnock, Scotland
- Date of death: 20 May 1930 (aged 53)
- Place of death: Canada
- Position: Defender

Youth career
- Kilmarnock Rugby XI

Senior career*
Years	Team	Apps	(Gls)
1897–1905	Kilmarnock	149	(10)

International career
1901	Scotland	1	(0)
1901–1902	Scottish League XI	2	(0)
- * Club domestic league appearances and goals

George Anderson (6 January 1877 – 20 May 1930) was a Scottish professional footballer. He played as a defender and made over 170 appearances for Kilmarnock.
