= Sandy Robertson (footballer, born 1878) =

Scottish footballer

Alexander Robertson (1878 – unknown) was a Scottish footballer. He was born in Dundee. His regular position was as a forward. He played for Dundee Violet, Dundee, Middlesbrough, Manchester United and Bradford Park Avenue.
