= Davie Glen =

Scottish footballer

Personal information
- Full name: David Glen
- Date of birth: 31 March 1881
- Place of birth: Brechin, Scotland
- Date of death: 9 April 1917 (aged 36)
- Place of death: near Arras, France
- Position: Centre forward

Senior career*
Years	Team	Apps	(Gls)
–1906	Brechin Hearts		
1906–1907	Brechin City		
1907	Dundee	4	(0)
1907–1914	Brechin City		
- Millwall
- * Club domestic league appearances and goals

David Glen MM (31 March 1881 – 9 April 1917) was a Scottish amateur footballer, best remembered for his time in the Northern League with Brechin City, for whom he played as a centre forward and was club captain. He also played in the Scottish League for Dundee and was described as "a gentlemanly player, feared by all his opponents for his robust style of play".

== Personal life ==
In December 1914, four months after Britain's entry into the First World War, Glen enlisted in the Royal Scots. He was posted to the Western Front in August 1915 and was lightly wounded in the stomach and hands in June 1916. He won the Military Medal for bravery and was recommended for the Distinguished Conduct Medal on a number of occasions. On 9 April 1917, Glen was serving as a sergeant when he was killed near Arras during the First Battle of the Scarpe. He was buried in Cabaret-Rouge British Cemetery, Souchez.

== Career statistics ==
Appearances and goals by club, season and competition
Club	Season	League			National Cup		Total	
Club	Season	Division	Apps	Goals	Apps	Goals	Apps	Goals
Dundee	1906–07	Scottish First Division	4	0	—		4	0
Career total			4	0	0	0	4	0

== Honours ==
Brechin City

- Forfarshire Cup: 1909–10
