= Matthew Ferguson (Scottish footballer) =

Scottish footballer

Matthew Ferguson (c. 1876 – 15 June 1902) was a Scottish footballer who played for Sunderland as a centre half. He made his debut for the club against Bury on 1 September 1896 in a 1–0 defeat at Newcastle Road. He won the Football League Championship with Sunderland in the 1901–02 season, but he died just weeks later in the summer of that year from pleuropneumonia, aged 26, and ultimately missed out on gaining international caps for Scotland. Through his time at Sunderland, spanning from 1896 to 1902 he made 166 league appearances, scoring 5 goals. He was also remembered for keeping goal in a friendly against Tottenham on 2 January 1900 after Sunderland goalkeeper Ned Doig injured his wrist the day before. A large attendance at his funeral demonstrated his popularity.

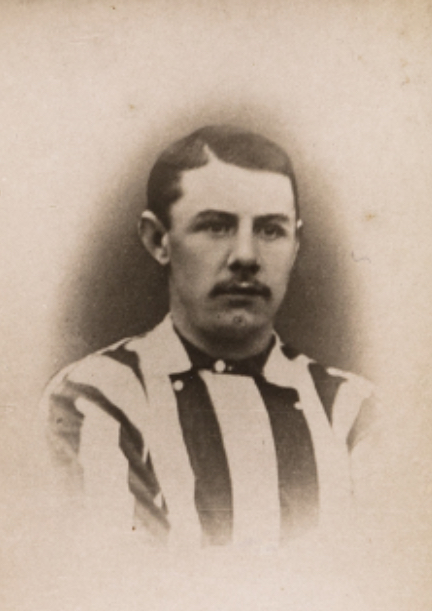
Ferguson for Sunderland - 1897
