= John Patrick (footballer, born 1870) =

Scottish footballer

Personal information
- Full name: John Patrick
- Date of birth: 10 January 1870
- Place of birth: Kilsyth, Scotland
- Date of death: 30 November 1945 (aged 75)
- Place of death: Kilsyth, Scotland
- Height: 5 ft 11 1/2 in (1.82 m)
- Position: Goalkeeper

Senior career*
Years	Team	Apps	(Gls)
- Grangemouth
1891–1892	Falkirk		
1892–1901	St Mirren	149	(0)
1896	→ Everton (trial)	1	(0)

International career
1895–1898	Scottish League XI	2	(0)
1897	Scotland	2	(0)
- * Club domestic league appearances and goals

John Patrick (10 January 1870 – 30 November 1945) was a Scottish footballer who played as a goalkeeper in the 1890s.

Patrick was born in Kilsyth, and after playing for Grangemouth and Falkirk he joined St Mirren. In 1896 he had a trial in the Football League with Everton but he only played one league game before returning to St Mirren, continuing as the regular goalkeeper until 1901 (Livingstone Rae became the new regular following a year when several players were tried).

Patrick made his debut for the Scotland national football team on 20 March 1897 against Wales in Wrexham. His second and final cap for Scotland came two weeks later against England. He also represented the Scottish Football League XI on two occasions.
