= William Baird (footballer) =

Scottish footballer

William Urquhart Baird (born 1 October 1874 in Leith – died 21 February 1943) was a Scottish footballer, who played for Dundee, St Bernard's and Scotland.
