= Bernard Breslin =

Scottish footballer

Personal information
- Date of birth: 2 May 1874
- Place of birth: Carfin, Scotland
- Date of death: 10 November 1913 (aged 39)
- Place of death: Harthill, Scotland
- Position: Right half

Senior career*
Years	Team	Apps	(Gls)
–	Carfin Shamrock		
1893–1906	Hibernian	226	(10)

International career
1897	Scotland	1	(0)
1898–1900	Scottish League XI	4	(1)
- * Club domestic league appearances and goals

Bernard Breslin (2 May 1874 – 10 November 1913) was a Scottish footballer who played as a right half for Hibernian and Scotland. Breslin was part of the Hibs teams that won the 1901–02 Scottish Cup and the Scottish league championship in 1903. He represented Scotland once, in 1897, and played four times for the Scottish League representative team between 1898 and 1900.

He died from tuberculosis in 1913.
