= David Crawford (footballer, born 1873) =

Scottish footballer

Personal information
- Date of birth: 9 March 1873
- Place of birth: Paisley, Scotland
- Date of death: 1937 (aged 63–64)
- Place of death: Dumfries, Scotland
- Height: 5 ft 10 in (1.78 m)
- Position: Full-back

Senior career*
Years	Team	Apps	(Gls)
–	Victoria		
1892–1894	St Mirren	32	(1)
1894–1903	Rangers	62	(1)
1903–1908	St Mirren	62	(1)

International career
1894–1900	Scotland	3	(0)
1906	Scottish Football League XI	1	(0)
- * Club domestic league appearances and goals

David Crawford (9 March 1873 – July 1937) was a Scottish footballer, who played for St Mirren, Rangers and the Scotland national team.

He was part of Rangers' 'perfect season' in the 1898–99 Scottish Division One where they won all 18 fixtures, featuring in the defence in 17 of those matches. Apart from that season, he was a capable reserve for the first team during the rest of his time at the Govan club, whereas in his two spells with hometown club St Mirren he was a regular, but had dropped out of the side by the time they reached the 1908 Scottish Cup Final.
