= 1897–98 Scottish Division Two =

Scottish Second Division
- Season: 1897–98
- Champions: Kilmarnock
- Promoted: n/a

The 1897–98 Scottish Second Division was won by Kilmarnock with Motherwell finishing bottom.

== Table ==
Pos	Team	Pld	W	D	L	GF	GA	GD	Pts	Qualification or relegation
1	Kilmarnock (C)	18	14	1	3	64	29	+35	29	
2	Port Glasgow Athletic	18	12	1	5	66	36	+30	25	
3	Morton	18	9	4	5	47	38	+9	22	
4	Leith Athletic	18	9	2	7	40	39	+1	20	
5	Abercorn	18	6	4	8	33	41	−8	16	
5	Ayr	18	7	2	9	36	43	−7	16	
5	Linthouse	18	6	4	8	38	39	−1	16	
8	Airdrieonians	18	6	2	10	45	56	−11	14	
9	Hamilton Academical	14	5	2	7	26	32	−6	12 (Note: Hamilton Academical took Renton's place in the league and fulfilled the club's remaining fixtures.)	
10	Motherwell	18	3	4	11	31	56	−25	10	
-	Renton (R)	4	0	0	4	2	19	−17	0	Resigned (Note: Renton resigned after playing four games.)

Source: statto.com
Rules for classification: Teams finish equal if level on points. Points system: 2 points for a win, 1 point for a draw, 0 points for a loss
(C) Champions; (R) Relegated
