= Nicol Smith =

Scottish footballer (1873–1905)

Nick Smith
Personal information
- Date of birth: 25 December 1873
- Place of birth: Darvel, Scotland
- Date of death: 6 January 1905 (aged 31)
- Place of death: Kilmarnock, Scotland
- Position: Fullback

Youth career
- Vale of Irvine

Senior career*
| Years | Team | Apps | (Gls) |
- Royal Albert
| 1891–1893 | Darvel | | |
| 1893–1904 | Rangers | 168 | (3) |

International career
| 1897–1904 | Scottish League XI | 9 | (1) |
| 1897–1902 | Scotland | 12 | (0) |
- * Club domestic league appearances and goals

Nicol Smith (25 December 1873 – 6 January 1905) was a Scottish footballer who played for Rangers.

== Biography ==
Born in Darvel, Ayrshire, Smith played as a fullback for local sides Vale of Irvine, Royal Albert and Darvel, earning junior international selection, before joining Rangers in 1893. He made only two league appearances in his first season at the club, but by 1893–94, he had established himself in the Rangers team, missing just one of the 18 league fixtures. During that season he was also responsible for bringing Alex Smith (who came from the same village but was not a relation) to the club, and the winger went on to become an important member of the side for the next 20 years.

Smith was part of Rangers' first ever Scottish Cup win in 1894, playing in all six games, including the 3–1 final win over Celtic. He formed an effective partnership in the defence alongside Jock Drummond for over a decade, and made over 300 competitive appearances.

Smith was also capped at international level, making 12 appearances for Scotland, two as captain. He also represented the Scottish League XI nine times.

In January 1905, aged 31, Smith died from enteric fever, an illness which also caused his wife's simultaneous death.

His son Jimmy was also a footballer who played as a winger, also for Rangers but primarily for Aberdeen in the 1920s (not to be confused with the Rangers striker of that name in the same era).

== Honours ==
Rangers

- Scottish League: 1898–99, 1899–1900, 1900–01, 1901–02
- Scottish Cup: 1893–94, 1896–97, 1897–98, 1902–03
  - Runner-up 1898–99, 1903–04

== See also ==
- List of Scotland national football team captains
- List of Scottish football families
