= Alec Smith (footballer, born 1875) =

Scottish footballer

Personal information
- Full name: Alexander Smith
- Date of birth: 7 November 1875
- Place of birth: Darvel, Scotland
- Date of death: 12 November 1954 (aged 78)
- Place of death: Darvel, Scotland
- Height: 5 ft 7 in (1.70 m)
- Position: Outside left

Youth career
- Darvel

Senior career*
Years	Team	Apps	(Gls)
1894–1915	Rangers	406	(128)

International career
1897–1913	Scottish League XI	14	(2)
1898–1911	Scotland	20	(3)
- * Club domestic league appearances and goals

Alexander Smith (7 November 1875 – 12 November 1954) was a Scottish footballer who played as an outside left for Rangers and the Scotland national team.

== Career ==
Born in Darvel, Ayrshire, Smith signed for Rangers in April 1894 from local side Darvel F.C., having been introduced at the suggestion of Nicol Smith (a defender who had made the same move a year earlier and came from the same village, but was not a relation).

He stayed with the Ibrox club for 21 years until retiring in 1915, was part of Rangers' treble-winning (Scottish Football League title, Glasgow Cup and Glasgow Merchants Charity Cup) teams of 1896–97, 1899–1900 and 1910–11, and played in 69 of the club's 74 matches during their run of four consecutive championships from 1898 to 1902. In total he made 642 competitive appearances for his only professional club (the fourth-highest tally in their long history) and scored 200 goals.

Smith received 20 caps in total for Scotland during his career, as well as representing the Scottish Football League XI 14 times. He returned to his native Darvel at the end of his footballing career, to work in a lace-making business in which he was a partner.

== Honours ==
Rangers

- Scottish League (7): 1898–99, 1899–1900, 1900–01, 1901–02, 1910–11, 1911–12, 1912–13
  - Runner-up 1895–96, 1897–98, 1904–05, 1913–14
- Scottish Cup (3): 1896–97, 1897–98, 1902–03
  - Finalist 1898–99, 1903–04, 1908–09
- Glasgow Cup (8): 1896–97, 1897–98, 1899–1900, 1900–01, 1901–02, 1910–11, 1911–12, 1912–13
- Glasgow Merchants Charity Cup (7): 1896–97, 1899–1900, 1903–04, 1905–06, 1906–07, 1908–09, 1910–11
