= Tommy McDermott (footballer, born 1878) =

Scottish footballer

Personal information
- Date of birth: 12 January 1878
- Place of birth: Glasgow, Scotland
- Date of death: 30 June 1961 (aged 83)
- Position: Inside forward

Youth career
- Rutherglen Rosebank

Senior career*
Years	Team	Apps	(Gls)
1898–1899	Cambuslang Hibernian		
1899–1901	Dundee	46	(9)
1901–1903	Celtic	12	(2)
1903–1905	Everton	64	(15)
1905–1906	Chelsea	31	(11)
1906–1908	Dundee	37	(16)
1908	Hibernian	0	(0)
1908	Bradford City	8	(1)
1908–1909	Gainsborough Trinity		
1909	Kilmarnock	3	(2)
1909	Forfar Athletic		
1909–1910	Dundee Hibernian	0	(0)
1910	Anfield Royal		
- St Helens Recreation
- Wirral Railway
1912–1913	Vale of Leven	1	(0)
- Broxburn Shamrock
1913–1914	Clyde	2	(0)
- * Club domestic league appearances and goals

Thomas McDermott (12 January 1878 – 30 June 1961) was a Scottish professional footballer who played as an inside forward.

== Career ==
Born in Bridgeton, Glasgow, McDermott spent his early career with Cambuslang Hibernian, Dundee, Celtic (winning the British League Cup and playing on the losing side in the 1902 Scottish Cup Final), Everton of England's top division (making 29 appearances in 1904–05 as the team missed out on the Football League title by a point) and second-tier, newly-formed Chelsea.

After a second spell at Dundee (where they were Scottish Football League runners-up in 1906–07), he joined Bradford City from Hibernian in February 1908. He made 8 league appearances for the West Yorkshire club, scoring once. He left the club in November 1908 to join Gainsborough Trinity; early in the following year was he back in Scotland featuring for Kilmarnock, followed by Forfar Athletic and the newly-formed Dundee Hibernian.

He later returned to the north-west of England, playing with amateur teams Anfield Royal, St Helens Recreation (better known as a rugby league team) and Wirral Railway's works team. Back in Scotland, he then signed for Vale of Leven and Broxburn Shamrock before coming home to the Glasgow area to play for Clyde in 1913.

== Sources ==
- Frost, Terry (1988). Bradford City A Complete Record 1903-1988. Breedon Books Sport. ISBN 0-907969-38-0.
