= Tommy Low =

Scottish footballer

Personal information
- Full name: Thomas Pollock Low
- Date of birth: 3 October 1874
- Place of birth: Cambuslang, Scotland
- Date of death: 11 December 1938 (aged 64)
- Place of death: San Diego, California, United States
- Position: Outside right

Senior career*
Years	Team	Apps	(Gls)
- Cambuslang Hibernian
1896–1899	Rangers	21	(5)
1899–1900	Dundee	17	(4)
1900–1901	Woolwich Arsenal	24	(1)
1901–1902	Falkirk		
1905	Abercorn		
1905	Rangers	3	(2)
1905–1906	Dunfermline Athletic		
1906–1907	Morton	10	(3)

International career
1897	Scotland	1	(0)
1897	Scottish League XI	1	(1)
- * Club domestic league appearances and goals

Thomas Pollock Low (3 October 1874 – 11 December 1938) was a Scottish footballer who played for Parkhead, Rangers (two spells, winning the Scottish Cup, Glasgow Cup and Glasgow Merchants Charity Cup in 1896–97), Dundee, Woolwich Arsenal, Falkirk, Abercorn (following a period out of the game due to a registration issue), Dunfermline Athletic, Morton and Scotland (one cap, 1897).

He was the brother of fellow Scottish international footballer James Low.
