= 1898–99 Scottish Division One =

6th season of top-tier football league in Scotland

Scottish Division One
- Season: 1898–99
- Champions: Rangers; 2nd title
- Relegated: Partick Thistle
- Matches: 90
- Goals: 402 (4.47 per match)
- Top goalscorer: Robert Hamilton (25 goals)

The 1898–99 Scottish Division One season was won by Rangers by ten points over nearest rival Heart of Midlothian. Rangers won all 18 of their league matches.

== League table ==
Pos	Team	Pld	W	D	L	GF	GA	GD	Pts	Qualification or relegation
1	Rangers (C)	18	18	0	0	79	18	+61	36	Champions
2	Heart of Midlothian	18	12	2	4	56	30	+26	26	
3	Celtic	18	11	2	5	51	33	+18	24	
4	Hibernian	18	10	3	5	42	43	−1	23	
5	St Mirren	18	8	4	6	46	32	+14	20	
6	Third Lanark	18	7	3	8	33	38	−5	17	
7	Clyde	18	4	4	10	23	48	−25	12	
7	St Bernard's	18	4	4	10	30	37	−7	12	
9	Partick Thistle (R)	18	2	2	14	19	58	−39	6	Relegated to the 1899–1900 Scottish Division Two
10	Dundee	18	1	2	15	23	65	−42	4	

Source: statto.com
Rules for classification: Teams finish equal if level on points. Points system: 2 points for a win, 1 point for a draw, 0 points for a loss
(C) Champions; (R) Relegated

== Results ==
Home \ Away	CEL	CLY	DND	HOM	HIB	PAR	RAN	STB	STM	THI
Celtic		9–2	4–1	3–2	1–2	4–0	0–4	1–0	4–1	2–1
Clyde	0–0		1–0	3–3	2–2	3–1	0–3	1–2	0–1	2–3
Dundee	1–4	1–3		2–5	2–4	5–1	1–2	1–1	1–7	1–3
Heart of Midlothian	2–2	4–0	6–3		4–0	5–1	2–3	3–1	4–2	2–1
Hibernian	2–1	2–1	5–0	1–5		1–1	3–4	4–3	4–3	1–1
Partick Thistle	3–8	0–1	2–0	0–1	1–4		0–5	0–3	1–4	1–3
Rangers	4–1	8–0	7–0	3–1	10–1	6–2		5–2	3–2	4–1
St Bernard's	2–3	4–1	2–2	1–3	1–3	2–3	0–2		0–0	4–2
St Mirren	4–0	2–2	5–1	2–3	2–0	2–2	1–3	2–1		4–1
Third Lanark	2–4	3–1	3–1	2–1	1–4	1–0	2–3	1–1	2–2	

Legend: Blue = home team win; Yellow = draw; Red = away team win.
