= Jock Drummond =

Scottish footballer

- Drummond in Scotland kit, 1895

Personal information
- Full name: John Drummond
- Date of birth: 13 April 1870
- Place of birth: Alva, Scotland
- Date of death: 24 January 1935 (aged 64)
- Place of death: Falkirk, Scotland
- Height: 5 ft 10 in (1.78 m)
- Position: Left back

Senior career*
Years	Team	Apps	(Gls)
1886–1892	Falkirk	0	(0)
1892–1904	Rangers	185	(2)
1904–1906	Falkirk	13	(0)

International career
1892–1903	Scotland	14	(0)
1895–1901	Scottish Football League XI	3	(0)
- * Club domestic league appearances and goals

John Drummond (13 April 1870 – 24 January 1935) was a Scottish footballer who played as a left back for Falkirk, Rangers and the Scotland national team.

== Career ==
Drummond joined Rangers from Falkirk (who had yet to join the Scottish Football League) in 1892. Over the next 12 years he went on to win five Scottish Cup medals (1894, 1897, 1898, 1899 and 1903) and four consecutive league titles (1898–99, 1899–1900, 1900–01 and 1901–02) – the first of which involved Rangers winning all 18 of their Scottish league matches (although Drummond only played in five).

He finished his playing career with first club Falkirk, latterly becoming their coach then, eventually, a director.

Drummond was capped 14 times by Scotland between 1892 and 1903. He captained his country on four occasions. He also played for the Scottish Football League XI.

Drummond was inducted into the Rangers F.C. Hall of Fame in 2011. He is notable for being the last outfield player in Scottish football to wear a cap while playing.

In 1935, Drummond killed himself by cutting his throat. His death took place less than a day before John Tait Robertson's death.

== See also ==
- List of Scotland national football team captains
