= Neilly Gibson =

Scottish footballer (1873–1947)

- Gibson in Scotland kit, 1895

Personal information
- Full name: Neil Gibson
- Date of birth: 23 February 1873
- Place of birth: Larkhall, Scotland
- Date of death: January 1947 (aged 73)
- Place of death: Larkhall, Scotland
- Position: Wing half

Senior career*
Years	Team	Apps	(Gls)
- Larkhall Thistle
1894	Royal Albert		
1894–1904	Rangers	157	(12)
1904–1909	Partick Thistle	104	(6)

International career
1895–1905	Scotland	14	(1)
1895–1903	Scottish League XI	11	(0)
- * Club domestic league appearances and goals

Neil Gibson (23 February 1873 – January 1947) was a Scottish footballer, who played for Rangers, Partick Thistle and the Scotland national team.

== Career ==
Adept at playing in either left or right wing half position, Gibson joined Rangers in 1894 from local Larkhall side Royal Albert, where he had been for only a few months after moving from Junior team Larkhall Thistle. During his time at Ibrox, he won four consecutive league titles (1898–99 (in which the team won all 18 fixtures), 1899–1900, 1900–01 and 1901–02) as well as the Scottish Cup in 1896–97, 1897–98, and 1902–03 plus five Glasgow Cups and three Glasgow Merchants Charity Cups.

He moved to Partick Thistle in 1904, where he remained for five years.

He was capped 14 times by Scotland between 1895 and 1905, scoring one goal. Gibson also represented the Scottish League XI 11 times.

Former Hibernian manager Willie McCartney stated that Gibson was "The greatest of my, and any generation following, in Scottish football", Steve Bloomer of Derby County and England described him as "The greatest footballer I ever saw", and Gibson's artistry led Harry Wood to dub him "Pavlova in football boots".

== International ==
=== International goals ===
Scores and results list Scotland's goal tally first.

#	Date	Venue	Opponent	Score	Result	Competition
1	27 March 1897	Ibrox Stadium, Glasgow	Ireland	2–0	5–1	1897 British Home Championship

== Personal life ==
His three sons, Willie, Neil and Jimmy, were also footballers, the latter a Scottish international.

== See also ==
- List of Scotland national football team captains
- List of Scottish football families
