= Matthew Dickie =

Scottish footballer (1873–1959)

Matt Dickie
Personal information
- Date of birth: 19 August 1873
- Place of birth: Rhu, Scotland
- Date of death: 30 December 1959 (aged 86)
- Place of death: Dunfermline, Scotland
- Position: Goalkeeper

Youth career
- Helensburgh Victoria

Senior career*
Years	Team	Apps	(Gls)
1894–1896	Renton	29	(0)
1896–1904	Rangers	141	(0)
1904–1907	Clyde	27	(0)

International career
1897–1900	Scotland	3	(0)
1898	Scottish League XI	1	(0)
- * Club domestic league appearances and goals

Matthew Dickie (19 August 1873 – 30 December 1959) was a Scottish professional footballer who played as a goalkeeper and is best known for his time with Rangers. He also played for Renton and Clyde.

Dickie made his Rangers debut against St Mirren in a 5–1 home win at Ibrox on 15 August 1896. He played 126 league matches from a possible 132 during one sequence and went on to make 175 first class appearances over his eight years at the club, and 275 in total.

Dickie won four Scottish Football League Championships (including the perfect season of 1898–99 in which he played in every match), three Scottish Cups, five Glasgow Cups and two Charity Cups with Rangers, and represented Scotland three times. Dickie was named to the All-Century Team for Scotland as goalkeeper.
