= John McPherson (footballer, born 1868) =

Scottish footballer (1868–1926)

- McPherson in Scotland kit, 1895

Personal information
- Date of birth: 19 June 1868
- Place of birth: Kilmarnock, Scotland
- Date of death: 31 July 1926 (aged 58)
- Place of death: Glasgow, Scotland
- Position: Forward

Youth career
- Britannia

Senior career*
Years	Team	Apps	(Gls)
1885–1887	Kilmarnock		
1887	Cowlairs		
1887	Everton		
1887	Kilmarnock		
1888–1890	Cowlairs		
1890–1902	Rangers	175	(98)

International career
1888–1897	Scotland	8	(6)
1897–1902	Scottish Football League XI	5	(2)
- * Club domestic league appearances and goals

John McPherson (19 June 1868 – 31 July 1926) was a Scottish footballer who played for Cowlairs, Kilmarnock, Rangers and the Scotland national team.

== Career ==
=== Early career ===
Born in Kilmarnock and known as 'Kitey' from a young age, McPherson started his career with his local side Kilmarnock, winning the Ayrshire Cup in 1885. He appeared for English club Everton as an amateur in 1887, also playing for Cowlairs of Glasgow in the early rounds of the 1887–88 Scottish Cup, which led to a protest by their defeated opponents Third Lanark over the possibility of McPherson and others having professional status (prohibited at the time). Another player (Robert Calderwood) was found to have been paid by an English club and received a two-year suspension, and the match was replayed with Cowlairs winning again. McPherson did not return to Everton, featuring instead for Kilmarnock in the same edition of the Scottish Cup before spending the next two years with Cowlairs, after which he joined Rangers in 1890.

=== Rangers ===
McPherson played mainly as a striker at Rangers, but was often used in other positions including goalkeeper. He played in the inaugural Scottish League season, 1890–91, where Rangers finished as joint champions with Dumbarton. McPherson's first recorded appearance was in a friendly against Everton on 19 April 1890 at Ibrox, and he scored in a 6–2 defeat. His first League appearance, however, was in Rangers' first ever Scottish League match, on 16 August 1890 in a 5–2 win over Hearts at Ibrox, in which he scored. McPherson scored 15 goals in Rangers' 18 matches in the League that season, including four in a 6–2 win over Cambuslang at Whitefield Park on 23 August 1890 (the first ever hat-trick scored in the Scottish Football League) and five in an 8–2 win over St Mirren on 4 October 1890.

Despite Rangers' successful introduction to the Scottish Football League, they had to wait until season 1898–99 to win the League title again. It was done in style as Rangers won all of their 18 League matches, with McPherson netting 10 times. That remarkable season was the first of four consecutive League titles and McPherson made significant contributions to all of them, scoring nine goals in 1899–1900, seven in 1900–01 and three in 1901–02 – which proved to be his last season with Rangers.

McPherson also won three Scottish Cup medals with Rangers, the first in 1894, where he scored in five of Rangers' six matches, including the 3–1 final win over Celtic at Hampden. McPherson also scored in the 1897 final, where Rangers defeated Dumbarton 5–1. His third medal came a year later, 1898, in a 2–0 win over his former club Kilmarnock. His final recorded appearance for Rangers was in a 2–0 friendly defeat to Glentoran on 2 April 1902.

== International career ==
McPherson was also a Scottish International, winning a total of eight caps and scoring six goals. (Note: In the Scottish Football Association's website profile, McPherson's record has been appended in error onto that of a namesake who gained two caps in 1890 and 1891.) (Note: Although most sources do attribute six goals, many include a goal against Ireland in 1890, though contemporary reports awarded it to Gilbert Rankin; this is balanced by a goal scored by McPherson against England in 1894, attributed to Sandy McMahon in some sources.) He was one of four players named John McPherson (none of whom were related) to have represented Scotland at full international level in the 19th century. He also played five times for the Scottish League representative side.

=== International goals ===
Scores and results list Scotland's goal tally first.

#	Date	Venue	Opponent	Score	Result	Competition
1	5 April 1890	Hampden Park (II), Glasgow	England	0–1	1–1	British Home Championship
2	26 March 1892	Tynecastle Park, Edinburgh	Wales	3–0	6–1	British Home Championship
3	26 March 1892	Tynecastle Park, Edinburgh	Wales	4–0	6–1	British Home Championship
4	4 April 1894	Celtic Park, Glasgow	England	2–1	2–2	British Home Championship
5	27 March 1897	Ibrox Park, Glasgow	Ireland	1–0	5–1	British Home Championship
6	27 March 1897	Ibrox Park, Glasgow	Ireland	5–1	5–1	British Home Championship

== Personal life ==
A qualified engine–fitter, McPherson maintained a close association with Rangers after his playing years, serving as a director from 1907 until his death in 1926 at the age of 58. He is buried in Craigton Cemetery, not far from Ibrox Stadium.

McPherson had several family members involved in football. His son Robert played at Junior level with Benburb, and his grandson Johnny (known as 'Sailor' due to his wartime navy service) played a single league match for Rangers in 1948 followed by spells at senior level with Ayr United and in the juniors with Irvine Meadow.

In addition, his younger brother David was a teammate at Rangers, had a long spell at Kilmarnock (including in the 1898 Scottish Cup final where he and John were on the opposing teams) and was also a Scottish international; elder brother James was a teammate at Kilmarnock, Cowlairs and the Glasgow FA team, and played as a guest for Celtic. (Note: Published accounts have suggested that 'Kitey' McPherson's family were related to James Quar McPherson who was the trainer at Kilmarnock when Kitey and his brothers played there, and then spent a lengthy period in the same role at Newcastle United working with Frank Watt (his sons Jim and Robert were also noted trainers, and Germany international Edwin Dutton was a son-in-law); however, other in-depth analyses state this is not accurate, with an apparently incorrect assumption being made that the fathers of James Quar and Kitey/David/James, both named James McPherson, were the same person.)
