= 1910–11 Dundee F.C. season =

Dundee
1910–11 season
- Manager: William Wallace
- Stadium: Dens Park
- Division One: 6th
- Scottish Cup: Semi-finals
- Top goalscorer: League: Robert Hamilton (17); All: Robert Hamilton (20)
Home colours

The 1910–11 season was the eighteenth season in which Dundee competed at a Scottish national level, playing in Division One, where they would finish in 6th place for the 2nd straight season. Dundee would also compete in the Scottish Cup, where they would mount a serious attempt to repeat their triumph the previous season, making it to the Semi-finals before losing to Hamilton Academical.

== Scottish Division One ==
Statistics provided by Dee Archive.

Match day	Date	Opponent	H/A	Score	Dundee scorer(s)	Attendance
1	20 August	Motherwell	A	0–3		9,000
2	27 August	Hibernian	H	1–1	Hamilton	10,000
3	3 September	Rangers	A	2–1	Lindley (2)	30,000
4	17 September	Celtic	A	1–2	Lindley	25,000
5	24 September	Queen's Park	H	5–0	Lindley, Hamilton, MacFarlane (2), Mair	8,000
6	26 September	Clyde	A	1–1	Hamilton	
7	1 October	Falkirk	A	1–0	Hamilton	11,000
8	8 October	Kilmarnock	H	2–1	Hamilton, Lee	6,000
9	15 October	Airdrieonians	A	1–3	Dainty	7,000
10	22 October	Third Lanark	H	2–1	MacFarlane, Bellamy	8,000
11	29 October	Heart of Midlothian	A	3–2	Hamilton (2), Lindley	11,000
12	5 November	Partick Thistle	H	2–1	MacLachlan, Mair	9,000
13	12 November	Aberdeen	H	2–0	Hamilton, MacFarlane	12,000
14	19 November	Greenock Morton	A	1–1	MacLachlan	7,000
15	26 November	Celtic	H	1–0	MacLachlan	20,000
16	3 December	Kilmarnock	A	0–2		9,000
17	10 December	Heart of Midlothian	H	4–1	Bellamy (2), Hamilton (2)	6,000
18	17 December	Clyde	H	1–0	Bellamy	10,000
19	24 December	Aberdeen	A	0–0		18,000
20	26 December	Third Lanark	A	0–2		7,000
21	31 December	Hamilton Academical	H	2–0	Mair, Hamilton	5,000
22	2 January	Falkirk	H	1–1	Comrie	13,000
23	7 January	Raith Rovers	A	1–2	Hamilton	4,000
24	14 January	St Mirren	H	5–1	Fraser (2), Langlands, Bellamy, Graydon	7,000
25	21 January	Raith Rovers	H	3–1	Fraser, Walker, Hamilton	4,000
26	4 February	Partick Thistle	A	2–3	Fraser, Bellamy	6,000
27	18 February	Hibernian	A	1–4	Langlands	3,000
28	25 March	St Mirren	A	0–1		
29	1 April	Queen's Park	A	2–1	Comrie, MacLachlan	7,000
30	8 April	Rangers	H	0–2		12,000
31	10 April	Airdrieonians	H	1–0	Hamilton	7,000
32	15 April	Motherwell	H	3–1	Bellamy, Hamilton (2)	8,000
33	19 April	Hamilton Academical	A	2–1	Neal, Hamilton	
34	29 April	Greenock Morton	H	1–2	Lindsay	6,000

=== League table ===
Pos	Team	Pld	W	D	L	GF	GA	GD	Pts
4	Partick Thistle	34	17	8	9	50	41	+9	42
5	Celtic	34	15	11	8	48	18	+30	41
6	Dundee	34	18	5	11	54	42	+12	41
7	Third Lanark	34	16	7	11	59	53	+6	39
8	Clyde	34	14	11	9	45	36	+9	39

Rules for classification: Teams finish equal if level on points. Points system: 2 points for a win, 1 point for a draw, 0 points for a loss

== Scottish Cup ==
Statistics provided by Dee Archive.

Match day	Date	Opponent	H/A	Score	Dundee scorer(s)	Attendance
1st round	28 January	Hibernian	H	2–1	MacFarlane, Hamilton	22,000
2nd round	11 February	Partick Thistle	A	3–0	Comrie, Langlands, Hamilton	28,000
Quarter-final	25 February	Rangers	H	2–1	Hamilton, Lee	30,000
Semi-final	11 March	Hamilton Academical	A	2–3	Bellamy (2)	15,000

== Player statistics ==
Statistics provided by Dee Archive

No.	Pos	Nat	Player	Total		First Division		Scottish Cup	
No.	Pos	Nat	Player	Apps	Goals	Apps	Goals	Apps	Goals
	FW	(England) ENG	Jim Bellamy	35	9	31	7	4	2
	DF	(Scotland) SCO	John Chaplin	9	0	9	0	0	0
	MF	(Scotland) SCO	George Comrie	30	3	26	2	4	1
	MF	(Scotland) SCO	John Comrie	1	0	1	0	0	0
	GK	(Scotland) SCO	Bob Crumley	35	0	31	0	4	0
	DF	(England) ENG	Bert Dainty	36	1	32	1	4	0
	FW	(Scotland) SCO	Billy Dickson	5	2	5	2	0	0
	FW	(Scotland) SCO	Jack Fraser	21	4	18	4	3	0
	FW	(Scotland) SCO	John Graydon	2	1	2	1	0	0
	FW	(Scotland) SCO	Robert Hamilton	35	20	31	17	4	3
	FW	(Scotland) SCO	John Hunter	2	0	2	0	0	0
	FW	(Scotland) SCO	George Langlands	19	3	16	2	3	1
	FW	(Scotland) SCO	Jim Law	2	0	2	0	0	0
	DF	(Scotland) SCO	Jimmy Lawson	19	0	19	0	0	0
	MF	(England) ENG	Bert Lee	26	2	22	1	4	1
	FW	(England) ENG	Frank Lindley	14	5	13	5	1	0
	DF	(Scotland) SCO	Archie Lindsay	13	1	9	1	4	0
	GK	(Scotland) SCO	Jack Lyall	1	0	1	0	0	0
	FW	(Scotland) SCO	Sandy MacFarlane	34	5	30	4	4	1
	MF	(Scotland) SCO	David Mair	19	3	19	3	0	0
	FW	(Scotland) SCO	David Martin	1	0	1	0	0	0
	DF	(Scotland) SCO	Bob McEwan	2	0	2	0	0	0
	FW	(Scotland) SCO	John McLachlan	16	4	16	4	0	0
	MF	(Scotland) SCO	Bert Neal	34	1	30	1	4	0
	FW	(Scotland) SCO	George G. Philip	1	0	1	0	0	0
	GK	(Scotland) SCO	George Philip	2	0	2	0	0	0
	MF	(Scotland) SCO	Andy Walker	4	1	3	1	1	0
	FW	(Scotland) SCO	Bill Wylie	1	0	1	0	0	0

== See also ==
- List of Dundee F.C. seasons
