= 1909–10 Dundee F.C. season =

Dundee
1909–10 season
- Manager: William Wallace
- Stadium: Dens Park
- Division One: 6th
- Scottish Cup: Champions
- Top goalscorer: League: Jim Bellamy (13); All: Jim Bellamy (15)
Home colours

The 1909–10 season was the seventeenth season in which Dundee competed at a Scottish national level, playing in Division One, where they would finish in 6th place. Dundee would also compete in the Scottish Cup, where they would win their first, and to date only, Scottish Cup, their first ever major honour. Playing 10 games, including 5 replays, the Dark Blues would lift the trophy after defeating Clyde at the third attempt 2–1 on 20 April 1910 at Ibrox Park in front of 24,000. Dundee would change up their kit slightly, returning to a buttoned shirt and adding three white hoops to their socks.

== Scottish Division One ==
Statistics provided by Dee Archive.

Match day	Date	Opponent	H/A	Score	Dundee scorer(s)	Attendance
1	21 August	Motherwell	H	2–0	Menzies, Bellamy	10,000
2	28 August	Greenock Morton	A	0–0		
3	4 September	Rangers	H	4–2	Langlands, McCann (2), Fraser	17,000
4	18 September	St Mirren	H	2–1	Langlands, MacFarlane	12,000
5	27 September	Rangers	A	1–2	Lee	35,000
6	2 October	Celtic	A	0–1		32,000
7	16 October	Kilmarnock	H	2–2	Lee, Bellamy	10,000
8	23 October	St Mirren	A	2–3	Bellamy (2)	
9	30 October	Third Lanark	H	2–0	Hunter, MacFarlane	9,000
10	6 November	Hibernian	A	0–0		8,000
11	13 November	Heart of Midlothian	H	4–1	Hunter, Langlands, Fraser, Bellamy	12,000
12	20 November	Port Glasgow Athletic	H	4–0	Hall (2), Bellamy, MacFarlane	8,000
13	27 November	Queen's Park	A	0–3		8,000
14	4 December	Clyde	H	1–1	McCann	7,000
15	11 December	Falkirk	A	1–6	Lee	
16	18 December	Airdrieonians	H	3–0	Bellamy (2), Fraser	6,000
17	25 December	Third Lanark	A	2–0	Dainty, Hunter	
18	1 January	Aberdeen	H	0–0		12,000
19	3 January	Heart of Midlothian	A	0–1		12,000
20	8 January	Hamilton Academical	A	3–3	Hall, Bellamy (2)	
21	15 January	Falkirk	H	1–0	Hall	18,000
22	12 February	Greenock Morton	H	2–1	Hunter, Bellamy	8,000
23	5 March	Hamilton Academical	H	2–1	Hall, Langlands	8,000
24	26 March	Port Glasgow Athletic	A	3–0	Bellamy, McCann, Langlands	8,000
25	28 March	Partick Thistle	A	0–1		12,000
26	2 April	Queen's Park	H	3–0	Hunter (2), Richardson (o.g.)	6,000
27	6 April	Partick Thistle	H	1–1	Hall	3,000
28	13 April	Hibernian	H	4–2	Hall (2), Dinnie (2)	6,000
29	19 April	Airdrieonians	A	0–3		
30	23 April	Aberdeen	A	1–3	Fraser	8,000
31	25 April	Motherwell	A	1–1	Bellamy	
32	26 April	Kilmarnock	H	1–2	Graydon	
33	27 April	Clyde	A	0–2		
34	30 April	Celtic	H	0–0		10,000

=== League table ===
Pos	Team	Pld	W	D	L	GF	GA	GD	Pts
4	Aberdeen	34	16	8	10	44	29	+15	40
5	Clyde	34	14	9	11	47	40	+7	37
6	Dundee	34	14	8	12	52	44	+8	36
7	Third Lanark	34	13	8	13	62	44	+18	34
8	Hibernian	34	14	6	14	33	40	−7	34

== Scottish Cup ==
Statistics provided by Dee Archive.

Match day	Date	Opponent	H/A	Score	Dundee scorer(s)	Attendance
1st round	22 January	Beith	A	1–1	G. Comrie	9,000
1R replay	29 January	Beith	H	1–0	Langlands	6,000
2nd round	5 February	Falkirk	H	3–0	Hall, Bellamy, Hunter	20,000
Quarter-final	26 February	Motherwell	A	3–1	Hall (3)	15,000
Semi-final	12 March	Hibernian	A	0–0		17,000
SF replay	19 March	Hibernian	H	0–0		23,000
SF 2nd replay	23 March	Hibernian	N	1–0	Hunter	20,000
Final	9 April	Clyde	N	2–2	Hunter, Langlands	60,000
Final replay	16 April	Clyde	N	0–0 (a.e.t.)		20,000
Final 2nd replay	20 April	Clyde	N	2–1	Bellamy 15', Hunter 56'	24,000

== Player statistics ==
Statistics provided by Dee Archive

No.	Pos	Nat	Player	Total		First Division		Scottish Cup	
No.	Pos	Nat	Player	Apps	Goals	Apps	Goals	Apps	Goals
	DF	(Scotland) SCO	Frank Allan	1	0	1	0	0	0
	FW	(England) ENG	Jim Bellamy	38	15	28	13	10	2
	DF	(Scotland) SCO	John Chaplin	35	0	26	0	9	0
	MF	(Scotland) SCO	George Comrie	32	1	22	0	10	1
	MF	(Scotland) SCO	John Comrie	5	0	5	0	0	0
	GK	(Scotland) SCO	Bob Crumley	41	0	31	0	10	0
	DF	(England) ENG	Bert Dainty	38	1	28	1	10	0
	DF	(Scotland) SCO	Charlie Dinnie	5	2	5	2	0	0
	DF	(Scotland) SCO	Tom Dorward	1	0	1	0	0	0
	FW	(Scotland) SCO	Jack Fraser	40	4	30	4	10	0
	FW	(Scotland) SCO	J. B. Gordon	1	0	1	0	0	0
	MF	(Scotland) SCO	Dave Gowans	3	0	3	0	0	0
	FW	(Scotland) SCO	John Graydon	7	1	7	1	0	0
	FW	(Canada) CAN	Sandy Hall	24	12	19	8	5	4
	FW	(Scotland) SCO	John Hunter	27	10	17	6	10	4
	MF	(Scotland) SCO	James Jackson	2	0	2	0	0	0
	FW	(Scotland) SCO	George Langlands	35	7	27	5	8	2
	DF	(Scotland) SCO	Jimmy Lawson	25	0	21	0	4	0
	MF	(England) ENG	Bert Lee	37	3	27	3	10	0
	DF	(Scotland) SCO	James Lyon	1	0	1	0	0	0
	FW	(Scotland) SCO	Sandy MacFarlane	26	3	19	3	7	0
	MF	(Scotland) SCO	David Mair	14	0	14	0	0	0
	FW	(Scotland) SCO	Daniel McCann	10	4	10	4	0	0
	DF	(Scotland) SCO	Bob McEwan	11	0	10	0	1	0
	FW	(Scotland) SCO	Alex Menzies	2	1	2	1	0	0
	FW	(Scotland) SCO	Jim Munro	2	0	2	0	0	0
	MF	(Scotland) SCO	Bert Neal	16	0	10	0	6	0
	GK	(Scotland) SCO	George Philip	3	0	3	0	0	0
	FW	(Scotland) SCO	George Richardson	1	0	1	0	0	0
	FW	(Scotland) SCO	George Steven	1	0	1	0	0	0

== See also ==
- List of Dundee F.C. seasons
