= 1908–09 Dundee F.C. season =

Dundee
1908–09 season
- Manager: William Wallace
- Stadium: Dens Park
- Division One: 2nd
- Scottish Cup: Second round
- Top goalscorer: League: John Hunter (29); All: John Hunter (32)
Home colours

The 1908–09 season was the sixteenth season in which Dundee competed at a Scottish national level, playing in Division One, where they would finish in 2nd place. In a very tight race which would go down to the final day, Dundee were pipped to the title by Celtic by just a single point. Dundee would also compete in the Scottish Cup, where they would lose to Rangers in the second round. Striker John "Sailor" Hunter would finish the season as Scotland's top scorer with 29 goals in the league, and 32 in all major competitions.

== Scottish Division One ==
Statistics provided by Dee Archive

Match day	Date	Opponent	H/A	Score	Dundee scorer(s)	Attendance
1	15 August	Heart of Midlothian	H	2–1	Hunter, Langlands	12,000
2	22 August	Airdrieonians	A	5–2	Fraser, Hunter (3), Langlands	7,000
3	29 August	Celtic	H	2–1	Hunter, Bellamy	21,000
4	5 September	Partick Thistle	A	1–1	Lee	3,000
5	12 September	Falkirk	H	1–1	Hunter	11,000
6	19 September	Greenock Morton	A	0–0		5,000
7	26 September	Queen's Park	H	7–1	MacFarlane (3), Hunter (3), Bellamy	7,000
8	28 September	Rangers	A	0–2		34,000
9	3 October	Hamilton Academical	A	1–0	Lee	5,000
10	10 October	Celtic	A	0–2		14,000
11	17 October	Hibernian	H	3–0	Hunter, MacFarlane, Fraser	9,000
12	24 October	Aberdeen	A	1–1	Langlands	12,500
13	31 October	Motherwell	H	3–1	Bellamy, Hunter (2)	7,000
14	7 November	Port Glasgow Athletic	A	3–2	Bellamy, Langlands, Hunter	2,000
15	14 November	Kilmarnock	H	5–0	MacFarlane, Bellamy (2), Hunter, Fraser	7,000
16	21 November	Falkirk	H	3–3	Langlands, Bellamy, Hunter	7,000
17	28 November	Airdrieonians	H	1–0	Hunter	7,000
18	12 December	Aberdeen	H	2–2	Dainty, Hunter	14,000
19	19 December	St Mirren	H	4–1	Hunter, Langlands, Dainty, MacFarlane	9,000
20	25 December	Third Lanark	A	1–2	Hunter	7,000
21	26 December	Kilmarnock	A	0–2		
22	1 January	Port Glasgow Athletic	H	1–0	Hunter	7,000
23	2 January	Motherwell	A	4–1	Hunter (2), MacFarlane, Lee	6,000
24	9 January	Rangers	H	4–0	Hunter (3), MacFarlane	16,000
25	16 January	Partick Thistle	H	3–2	McCann, Hunter (2)	6,000
26	30 January	Clyde	H	1–0	Bellamy	14,000
27	20 February	Hibernian	A	1–0	Bellamy	10,000
28	27 February	Greenock Morton	H	1–2	Fraser	6,000
29	6 March	Clyde	A	2–0	Bellamy, Hunter	3,000
30	13 March	St Mirren	A	2–1	Dainty, MacFarlane	7,000
31	20 March	Heart of Midlothian	A	0–1		12,500
32	27 March	Third Lanark	H	1–0	Lee	6,000
33	3 April	Hamilton Academical	H	3–0	Hunter, Langlands, Mair	5,000
34	24 April	Queen's Park	H	2–0	Bellamy, Langlands	6,000

=== League table ===
Pos	Team	Pld	W	D	L	GF	GA	GD	Pts
1	Celtic (C)	34	23	5	6	71	24	+47	51
2	Dundee	34	22	6	6	70	32	+38	50
3	Clyde	34	21	6	7	61	37	+24	48
4	Rangers	34	19	7	8	91	38	+53	45
5	Airdrieonians	34	16	9	9	67	46	+21	41

Source: "1908-1909 Division 1 - SPFL Archive". SPFL.
(C) Champions

== Scottish Cup ==
Statistics provided by Dee Archive

Match day	Date	Opponent	H/A	Score	Dundee scorer(s)	Attendance
1st round	23 January	Ayr Parkhouse	H	9–0	MacFarlane, Bellamy (3), Hunter (3), Dainty, Langlands	12,000
2nd round	6 February	Rangers	H	0–0		28,000
2R replay	13 February	Rangers	A	0–1		54,500

== Player statistics ==
Statistics provided by Dee Archive

No.	Pos	Nat	Player	Total		First Division		Scottish Cup	
No.	Pos	Nat	Player	Apps	Goals	Apps	Goals	Apps	Goals
	FW	(England) ENG	Jim Bellamy	34	14	31	11	3	3
	DF	(Scotland) SCO	George Chaplin	6	0	6	0	0	0
	DF	(Scotland) SCO	John Chaplin	29	0	26	0	3	0
	FW	(Scotland) SCO	Willie Cooper	2	0	2	0	0	0
	GK	(Scotland) SCO	Bob Crumley	36	0	33	0	3	0
	DF	(England) ENG	Bert Dainty	33	4	30	3	3	1
	FW	(Scotland) SCO	Jack Fraser	35	4	32	4	3	0
	FW	(Canada) CAN	Sandy Hall	3	0	3	0	0	0
	FW	(Scotland) SCO	John Hunter	35	32	32	29	3	3
	FW	(Scotland) SCO	Fred Kemp	1	0	1	0	0	0
	FW	(Scotland) SCO	George Langlands	32	9	29	8	3	1
	DF	(Scotland) SCO	Jimmy Lawson	25	0	25	0	0	0
	MF	(England) ENG	Bert Lee	36	4	33	4	3	0
	FW	(Scotland) SCO	Sandy MacFarlane	36	10	33	9	3	1
	MF	(Scotland) SCO	David Mair	19	1	16	1	3	0
	FW	(Scotland) SCO	Daniel McCann	7	1	7	1	0	0
	MF	(Scotland) SCO	Bert Neal	33	0	30	0	3	0
	DF	(Scotland) SCO	Albert Oswald	4	0	4	0	0	0
	GK	(Scotland) SCO	George Philip	1	0	1	0	0	0

== See also ==
- List of Dundee F.C. seasons
