= 1907–08 Dundee F.C. season =

Dundee
1907–08 season
- Manager: William Wallace
- Stadium: Dens Park
- Division One: 4th
- Scottish Cup: Second round
- Top goalscorer: League: John Hunter (18); All: John Hunter (18)
Home colours

The 1907–08 season was the fifteenth season in which Dundee competed at a Scottish national level, playing in Division One, where they would finish in 4th place. Dundee would also compete in the Scottish Cup, where they would lose to Aberdeen in the second round.

== Scottish Division One ==
Statistics provided by Dee Archive

Match day	Date	Opponent	H/A	Score	Dundee scorer(s)	Attendance
1	17 August	Falkirk	A	2–1	McDermott, Hunter	
2	24 August	Partick Thistle	H	1–0	Dean	10,000
3	31 August	Celtic	A	2–3	MacFarlane, Dean	27,000
4	7 September	Airdrieonians	H	3–1	Webb (3)	10,280
5	14 September	Heart of Midlothian	A	0–1		17,500
6	21 September	Aberdeen	H	1–0	Dean	10,000
7	28 September	Greenock Morton	H	5–2	Webb, McDermott (2), Dean, MacFarlane	8,280
8	5 October	Motherwell	A	1–0	Fraser	6,000
9	12 October	Clyde	H	6–1	Hunter (3), Webb, Dainty, Neal	8,000
10	19 October	Queen's Park	H	5–0	Hunter (3), Dainty, Webb	7,000
11	26 October	St Mirren	H	6–0	McDermott (4), Hunter, Jeffray	17,000
12	2 November	Hibernian	A	1–0	Hunter	10,000
13	9 November	Third Lanark	H	1–0	Dainty	9,800
14	16 November	Port Glasgow Athletic	A	5–0	MacFarlane (2), Hunter (2), Webb	1,200
15	23 November	Kilmarnock	H	4–0	MacFarlane, Dainty, McDermott, Hunter	9,000
16	30 November	Hamilton Academical	H	3–0	MacFarlane (2), McDermott	8,000
17	7 December	Aberdeen	A	1–1	Hunter	17,000
18	14 December	Greenock Morton	A	2–2	Dainty, Lee	4,500
19	21 December	Rangers	H	1–2	Hunter	15,000
20	25 December	Third Lanark	A	1–1	Dean	8,000
21	28 December	Clyde	H	3–2	Dainty, Lee, Hunter	
22	1 January	Port Glasgow Athletic	H	3–1	Currie, Neal, Dainty	10,000
23	2 January	Hibernian	H	0–1		11,000
24	4 January	Heart of Midlothian	H	0–0		9,000
25	11 January	Airdrieonians	A	2–0	Dean, Webb	
26	18 January	Partick Thistle	H	3–0	Dainty, Hunter, MacFarlane	
27	1 February	Motherwell	H	0–0		8,000
28	29 February	Falkirk	A	2–2	Langlands, Dean	8,000
29	7 March	Hamilton Academical	A	1–2	Hunter	5,500
30	14 March	Queen's Park	A	3–1	Langlands, Dean (2)	13,000
31	21 March	Kilmarnock	A	1–1	Fraser	5,500
32	28 March	Celtic	H	2–0	Dean, Hunter	16,000
33	20 April	Rangers	A	0–2		12,000
34	28 April	St Mirren	A	0–0		

=== League table ===
Pos	Team	Pld	W	D	L	GF	GA	GD	Pts
2	Falkirk	34	22	7	5	103	42	+61	51
3	Rangers	34	21	8	5	74	40	+34	50
4	Dundee	34	20	8	6	71	28	+43	48
5	Hibernian	34	17	8	9	55	42	+13	42
6	Airdrieonians	34	18	5	11	58	41	+17	41

== Scottish Cup ==
Statistics provided by Dee Archive

Match day	Date	Opponent	H/A	Score	Dundee scorer(s)	Attendance
1st round	25 January	Airdrieonians	A	1–0	Neal	9,000
2nd round	8 February	Aberdeen	H	0–0		15,000
2R replay	15 February	Aberdeen	A	2–2	Hall (2)	24,000
2R 2nd replay	19 February	Aberdeen	N	1–3	Hall	19,525

== Player statistics ==
Statistics provided by Dee Archive

No.	Pos	Nat	Player	Total		First Division		Scottish Cup	
No.	Pos	Nat	Player	Apps	Goals	Apps	Goals	Apps	Goals
	DF	(Scotland) SCO	George Chaplin	36	0	32	0	4	0
	GK	(Scotland) SCO	Bob Crumley	38	0	34	0	4	0
	FW	(Scotland) SCO	Pat Currie	1	1	1	1	0	0
	DF	(England) ENG	Bert Dainty	37	8	33	8	4	0
	FW	(England) ENG	Alf Dean	19	10	18	10	1	0
	FW	(Scotland) SCO	Jack Fraser	37	2	33	2	4	0
	FW	(Canada) CAN	Sandy Hall	5	3	3	0	2	3
	DF	(Scotland) SCO	Archie Harper	3	0	3	0	0	0
	FW	(Scotland) SCO	John Hunter	34	18	30	18	4	0
	MF	(Scotland) SCO	James Jackson	7	0	7	0	0	0
	MF	(Scotland) SCO	Jimmy Jeffray	30	1	26	1	4	0
	FW	(Scotland) SCO	George Langlands	7	2	7	2	0	0
	DF	(Scotland) SCO	Jimmy Lawson	1	0	1	0	0	0
	MF	(England) ENG	Bert Lee	32	2	28	2	4	0
	FW	(Scotland) SCO	Sandy MacFarlane	37	8	33	8	4	0
	FW	(Scotland) SCO	Tommy McDermott	17	9	17	9	0	0
	DF	(Scotland) SCO	John McKenzie	35	0	31	0	4	0
	MF	(Scotland) SCO	Bert Neal	18	3	16	2	2	1
	FW	(England) ENG	Charlie Webb	24	8	21	8	3	0

== See also ==
- List of Dundee F.C. seasons
