= Edinburgh Exhibition Cup =

- Founded: 1908
- Region: Scotland
- Teams: 4
- Current champions: (Scotland) Rangers

The Edinburgh Exhibition Cup was an invitational football tournament held at the Exhibition Sports Grounds, Saughton, Edinburgh in August 1908, as part of the Scottish National Exhibition event being held there during that summer.

== Results ==
Semi-finals
5 August
St Bernard's	0
Rangers	1
7 August
Queen's Park	1
Dundee	3

Final
13 August
Rangers	1
Dundee	1

Rangers beat Dundee on the toss of a coin.

== Details ==
=== Semi-finals ===
5 August 1908

St Bernard's	0 – 1	Rangers
		Livingstone

Exhibition Sports Grounds, Edinburgh
Attendance: 9,000
Referee: T. Robertson
7 August 1908

Queen's Park	1 – 3	Dundee
Murray		Fraser; MacFarlane

Exhibition Sports Grounds, Edinburgh
Attendance: 10,000
Referee: T. Robertson

=== Final ===
13 August 1908

Rangers	1 – 1	Dundee
Livingstone		MacFarlane

Exhibition Sports Grounds, Edinburgh
Attendance: 10,000
Referee: T. Robertson
- Both teams had a penalty kick saved during the match.
- Rangers won on the toss of a coin.

==== Teams ====
Dundee:
GK	Bob Crumley
RB	Jack Chaplin
LB	George Chaplin
RH	Bert Lee
CH	Herbert Dainty
LH	Bert Neal
OR	Jim Bellamy
IR	Sandy MacFarlane
CF	George Langlands
IL	John 'Sailor' Hunter
OL	Jack Fraser

Rangers:
GK	Harry Rennie
RB	Jimmy Sharp
LB	Alex Craig
RH	Jimmy Gordon
CF	Robert Campbell
LH	Jimmy Galt
OR	Robert Noble
IR	Thomas Gilchrist
CF	Thomas Murray
IL	George Livingstone
OL	Alex Smith

== Earlier editions ==
Football was also played at two earlier exhibitions in Edinburgh (the International Exhibition of Industry, Science and Art in 1886 and the International Exhibition of Science, Art & Industry in 1890), although these took the form of a series of single matches (with a cup and medals awarded for the winners of each) rather than a knockout tournament.

=== 1886 ===
All matches played at the exhibition's sports grounds at The Meadows.

Date	Team 1	Score	Team 2	Ref.
7 October 1886	Hibernian	2–1	3rd Lanark RV	
7 October 1886	Rangers	4–1	St Bernard's	
8 October 1886	Renton	2–1	Heart of Midlothian	

=== 1890 ===
All matches played at the exhibition's sports grounds at Meggetland.

Date	Team 1	Score	Team 2	Ref.
6 August 1890	Heart of Midlothian	2–0	Hibernian	
13 August 1890	Leith Athletic	3–1	St Bernard's	
20 August 1890	Dumbarton	3–1	Leith Athletic	
27 August 1890	Queen's Park	9–0	Hibernian	
30 August 1890	3rd Lanark RV	2–1	Dundee Our Boys	
15 September 1890	Heart of Midlothian	1–0	(England) Nottingham Forest	
18 September 1890	Kilmarnock	8–1	Wishaw Thistle	
2 October 1890	Rangers	2–0	(England) Sunderland Albion	

== See also ==
- 1888 Glasgow Exhibition Cup, similar tournament in 1888
- Glasgow International Exhibition Cup, similar tournament in 1901
- Empire Exhibition Trophy, similar tournament in 1938 (also featuring English clubs)
- Saint Mungo Cup, similar tournament in 1951
- Coronation Cup (football), similar tournament in 1953 (also featuring English clubs)
