= 1911–12 Dundee F.C. season =

Dundee
1911–12 season
- Manager: William Wallace
- Stadium: Dens Park
- Division One: 8th
- Scottish Cup: Second round
- Top goalscorer: League: Robert Hamilton (14); All: Robert Hamilton (15)
Home colours

The 1911–12 season was the nineteenth season in which Dundee competed at a Scottish national level, playing in Division One, where they would finish in 8th place. Dundee would also compete in the Scottish Cup, where they would make it to the 2nd round before losing to Heart of Midlothian.

== Scottish Division One ==
Statistics provided by Dee Archive.

Match day	Date	Opponent	H/A	Score	Dundee scorer(s)	Attendance
1	19 August	Motherwell	H	3–1	Bellamy (2), MacFarlane	10,000
2	26 August	Hibernian	A	1–2	Girdwood (o.g.)	11,000
3	2 September	Rangers	A	1–2	Hamilton	30,000
4	16 September	Celtic	H	3–1	Bellamy (2), MacFarlane	20,000
5	23 September	Queen's Park	H	4–0	MacFarlane, Martin	5,000
6	30 September	Airdrieonians	H	1–1	MacLachlan	
7	7 October	Heart of Midlothian	H	1–1	Hamilton	7,000
8	14 October	Raith Rovers	A	1–1	Hamilton	7,000
9	21 October	Greenock Morton	A	0–3		5,000
10	28 October	Heart of Midlothian	A	4–1	Langlands, Hamilton (2), Bellamy	10,000
11	4 November	Hibernian	H	3–2	Hamilton (2), Comrie	6,000
12	11 November	Airdrieonians	A	0–0		
13	18 November	St Mirren	H	4–0	Fraser, Langlands, Hamilton, Bellamy	5,000
14	25 November	Kilmarnock	A	0–1		4,000
15	2 December	Clyde	H	2–0	Fraser, Bellamy	5,000
16	9 December	Falkirk	H	1–1	MacLachlan	6,000
17	16 December	Aberdeen	A	1–2	Comrie	10,000
18	23 December	Hamilton Academical	H	2–0	Langlands, Martin	4,000
19	25 December	Third Lanark	A	0–1		10,000
20	30 December	Clyde	A	0–3		8,000
21	1 January	Falkirk	H	0–0		10,000
22	6 January	Motherwell	A	0–0		6,000
23	13 January	Aberdeen	H	4–0	Langlands, Bellamy (2), Wylie	12,000
24	20 January	Queen's Park	A	0–1		8,000
25	10 February	Raith Rovers	H	2–2	Bellamy, Comrie	5,000
26	17 February	Partick Thistle	A	0–2		12,000
27	2 March	Celtic	A	0–2		6,000
28	9 March	Partick Thistle	H	0–2		4,000
29	16 March	Rangers	H	2–1	Bellamy, Wylie	8,000
30	23 March	Kilmarnock	H	5–2	Hamilton (3), Langlands, MacLachlan	4,000
31	30 March	Third Lanark	H	3–1	Wylie, Bellamy, Langlands	5,000
32	6 April	St Mirren	A	1–1	MacFarlane	4,000
33	20 April	Hamilton Academical	A	1–0	Hamilton	
34	27 April	Greenock Morton	A	2–4	Hamilton (2)	4,000

=== League table ===
Pos	Team	Pld	W	D	L	GF	GA	GD	Pts
6	Morton	34	14	9	11	44	44	0	37
7	Falkirk	34	15	6	13	46	33	+13	36
8	Dundee	34	13	9	12	52	41	+11	35
9	Aberdeen	34	14	7	13	44	44	0	35
10	Airdrieonians	34	12	8	14	40	41	−1	32

Source: "1911-1912 Division 1 - SPFL Archive". SPFL.

== Scottish Cup ==
Statistics provided by Dee Archive.

Match day	Date	Opponent	H/A	Score	Dundee scorer(s)	Attendance
1st round	27 January	Partick Thistle	A	2–2	Neal, MacLachlan	15,000
1R replay	3 February	Partick Thistle	H	3–0	Hamilton, Wylie, MacLachlan	18,000
2nd round	11 March	Heart of Midlothian	A	0–1		30,000

== Player statistics ==
Statistics provided by Dee Archive

No.	Pos	Nat	Player	Total		First Division		Scottish Cup	
No.	Pos	Nat	Player	Apps	Goals	Apps	Goals	Apps	Goals
	MF	(Scotland) SCO	Andy Aitken	32	0	29	0	3	0
	FW	(England) ENG	Jim Bellamy	33	12	30	12	3	0
	MF	(Scotland) SCO	George Comrie	31	3	28	3	3	0
	MF	(Scotland) SCO	Jim Duncan	1	0	1	0	0	0
	DF	(United States) USA	Jock Ferguson	24	0	21	0	3	0
	FW	(Scotland) SCO	Jack Fraser	17	2	17	2	0	0
	FW	(Scotland) SCO	John Graydon	1	0	1	0	0	0
	FW	(Scotland) SCO	Robert Hamilton	33	15	30	14	3	1
	MF	(Scotland) SCO	Joe Johnstone	1	0	1	0	0	0
	FW	(Scotland) SCO	George Langlands	31	6	28	6	3	0
	DF	(Scotland) SCO	Jimmy Lawson	25	0	22	0	3	0
	DF	(Scotland) SCO	Archie Lindsay	23	0	23	0	0	0
	GK	(Scotland) SCO	Jack Lyall	37	0	34	0	3	0
	FW	(Scotland) SCO	Sandy MacFarlane	21	5	21	5	0	0
	MF	(Scotland) SCO	David Mair	2	0	2	0	0	0
	FW	(Scotland) SCO	David Martin	7	3	7	3	0	0
	FW	(Scotland) SCO	Bob McKnight	1	0	1	0	0	0
	FW	(Scotland) SCO	John McLachlan	30	5	27	3	3	2
	MF	(Scotland) SCO	Bert Neal	36	1	33	0	3	1
	FW	(Scotland) SCO	George G. Philip	5	0	5	0	0	0
	MF	(Scotland) SCO	Andy Walker	1	0	1	0	0	0
	FW	(Scotland) SCO	Bill Wylie	15	4	12	3	3	1

== See also ==
- List of Dundee F.C. seasons
