= Alexander Hall (footballer, born 1880) =

Scottish-Canadian soccer player

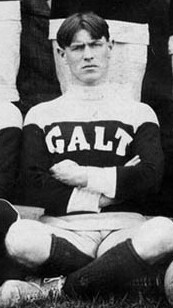
- Hall with Galt in 1904

Personal information
- Full name: Alexander Noble Hall
- Date of birth: 3 December 1880
- Place of birth: Aberdeen, Scotland
- Date of death: 25 September 1943 (aged 62)
- Place of death: Toronto, Ontario, Canada
- Position: Centre forward

Senior career*
Years	Team	Apps	(Gls)
1898–1901	Peterhead		
1901	Buckie Thistle		
1902–1903	Toronto Scots		
1904	Galt		
1905	Westmount		
1905	Aberdeen	0	(0)
1905–1906	Peterhead		
1906–1907	St Bernard's	10	(12)
1907–1908	Newcastle United	6	(2)
1908–1910	Dundee	25	(8)
1910–1911	Portsmouth		
1911–1912	Motherwell	11	(0)
1912–1915	Dunfermline Athletic	68	(33)
1920–1923	Peterhead		
- Mimico Beach

International career
1904	Canada Olympic	2	(3)
Medal record
Men's football
Canada
First place	Olympic Games	1904
- * Club domestic league appearances and goals

Alexander Noble Hall (3 December 1880 – 25 September 1943), sometimes known as Sandy Hall, was a professional soccer player who played as a centre forward in the Scottish League for Dunfermline Athletic, Dundee, Motherwell, and St Bernard's. Born in Scotland, he was a part of Canada's gold medal-winning 1904 Olympic team and finished the tournament as joint-top scorer, with three goals. The goals came in the form of a hat-trick in a 7–0 win over the United States, represented by Christian Brothers College.

== Personal life ==
Born in Aberdeen and growing up in Peterhead, Hall played amateur football and worked as a stonecutter locally before emigrating to Canada in 1901. He returned to Scotland in 1905 and became a professional footballer in 1906. In 1912, the Carnegie Hero Fund and the Royal Humane Society recognised Hall with awards for bravery for his rescue of a child from Peterhead harbour. While a player with Dunfermline Athletic prior to the First World War, he also served as the club's groundsman. During the war, Hall served in the Royal Garrison Artillery, the Royal Engineers, the Tank Corps, and married his wife, with whom he had three children. The family emigrated to Toronto in 1923 and he worked at Wellington Destructor. Hall died in Toronto on 25 September 1943.

In 1983, Hall's youngest son, Tom, became the first world's recipient of a successful single-lung transplant.

== Career statistics ==
=== Club ===
Appearances and goals by club, season and competition
Club	Season	League			National cup (Note: Includes Scottish Cup, FA Cup)		Other		Total	
Club	Season	Division	Apps	Goals	Apps	Goals	Apps	Goals	Apps	Goals
St Bernard's	1906–07	Scottish Second Division	10	12	0	0	7 (Note: Appearances in Scottish Qualifying Cup)	4	17	16
Newcastle United	1907–08	First Division	6	2	0	0	―		6	2
Dundee	1907–08	Scottish First Division	3	0	2	3	―		5	3
Dundee	1908–09	Scottish First Division	3	0	0	0	―		3	0
Dundee	1909–10	Scottish First Division	19	8	5	4	―		24	12
Dundee	Total		25	8	7	7	―		32	15
Motherwell	1911–12	Scottish First Division	11	0	5	0	―		16	0
Dunfermline Athletic	1912–13	Scottish Second Division	25	18	7	0	―		32	18
Dunfermline Athletic	1913–14	Scottish Second Division	21	11	0	0	6	0	27	11
Dunfermline Athletic	1914–15	Scottish Second Division	22	4	―		1	0	23	4
Dunfermline Athletic	Total		68	33	7		7	0	82	33
Career total			120	55	19	7	14	4	153	66

=== International ===
Appearances and goals by national team and year
National team	Year	Apps	Goals
Canada Olympic	1904	2	3
Total		2	3

Scores and results list Canada Olympic's goal tally first, score column indicates score after each Hall goal.

List of international goals scored by Alexander Hall
No.	Date	Venue	Opponent	Score	Result	Competition	Ref.
1	16 November 1904	World's Fair Stadium, St. Louis, United States	(United States) Christian Brothers College	1–0	7–0	1904 Summer Olympics	
2	16 November 1904	World's Fair Stadium, St. Louis, United States	(United States) Christian Brothers College	?–0	7–0	1904 Summer Olympics	
3	16 November 1904	World's Fair Stadium, St. Louis, United States	(United States) Christian Brothers College	?–0	7–0	1904 Summer Olympics	

== Honours ==
Galt FC

- Summer Olympic Games: 1904

St Bernard's

- Scottish League Second Division: 1906–07

Dundee

- Scottish Cup: 1909–10

Motherwell

- Lanarkshire Cup: 1911–12

Dunfermline Athletic

- Fife Cup: 1913–14

Peterhead

- Aberdeenshire Charity Cup: 1920–21

Individual

- Summer Olympic Games top-scorer: 1904
