= William Walker (footballer, born 1884) =

Scottish footballer

Willie Walker
Personal information
- Full name: William Walker
- Date of birth: 18 January 1884
- Place of birth: Yoker, Scotland
- Date of death: 2 May 1945 (aged 61)
- Place of death: Glasgow, Scotland
- Position: Right half

Senior career*
Years	Team	Apps	(Gls)
1902–1906	Glasgow Perthshire		
1902–1906	Rangers	2	(0)
1904–1906	→ Clyde (loan)	40	(8)
1906–1918	Clyde	316	(19)
1907–1908	→ Reading (loan)		
1917–1918	→ Clydebank (loan)	26	(0)
1918–1921	Clydebank	84	(3)
1921–1923	Fraserburgh		

International career
1906 (Note: Inter-league match between Second Division XI v First Division XI of the Scottish Football League.)	SFL 2 XI v SFL 1 XI	1	(0)
1909–1912 (Note: The source lists 1 match in 1909, but Walker also played in a 1912 match, with Jimmy Gordon counted twice.)	Scottish League XI	2	(0)
1909–1910	Scotland	2	(0)
- * Club domestic league appearances and goals

William Walker (18 January 1884 – 2 May 1945) was a Scottish footballer, who played for Rangers, Clyde, Reading, Clydebank, Fraserburgh and Scotland.

== Honours ==
Clyde

- Scottish Cup: Runner-up 1909–10, 1911–12
- Scottish Division Two: 1904–05
  - Runners-up: 1905–06
- Glasgow Charity Cup: 1909–10
- Glasgow & West Shield: 1906–07

Clydebank

- Clydebank Charity Cup: 1917–18, 1918–19, 1919–20

Fraserburgh

- Aberdeenshire League: 1922–23
- Aberdeenshire Charity Cup: 1921–22

Scotland

- British Home Championship: 1909–10
  - Runner-up: 1908–09
