= Mary Ann Maitland =

- Born: Mary Ann Davidson; 26 January 1839; Elgin, Moray, Scotland
- Died: February 24, 1919 (aged 80); St. Marys, Ontario, Canada
- Occupation: author
- Spouse: George Forbes Maitland (m. 1861)
- Writing career
- Genres: poems, hymns, short stories
- Subjects: The "Ann" character in Maitland's short story, "Charity Ann: Founded on Facts" (Godey's Lady's Book, January 1892), provided the background for Anne Shirley's history and adoption in Anne of Green Gables
- Notable work: "Charity Ann: Founded on Facts"

Mary Ann Maitland (née , Davidson; 26 January 1839 — 24 February 1919) was a Scottish-born Canadian author of poems, hymns, and short stories. She emigrated to Canada at the age of 18, where her work as a poet gained recognition. Maitland was a prolific contributor to numerous periodicals and a number of her hymns were set to music. Her short story "Charity Ann," published in 1892, provided the background for the character Anne Shirley's history in the novel Anne of Green Gables.

== Early life ==
Mary Ann Davidson was born in Elgin, Moray, Scotland, 26 January 1839. She is a daughter of James Alexander Davidson, the first teacher in the Infant School of Elgin, and Elizabeth Wilson Maitland. She was a maternal granddaughter of the Provost Wilson of that town. Maitland came to Canada with her father in 1857, when she was 18 years of age.

== Career ==
Before leaving Scotland, Maitland had written some creditable verses, but it was not until she came to Canada that her merits as a poet were acknowledged. In a short time, her contributions found their way into the S.S. Times, The New York Observer, Christian at Work, Godey's Lady's Book, Gems of Poetry, Woman's Magazine, and other standard American periodicals. Maitland's own estimate of her poems was:— "I am well aware that they contain no high poetic flight or lofty imagery; perhaps their only merit is their tenderness." A writer in Daughters of America who was familiar with Maitland and her writings, said of her that she is "one of the sweetest singers of the day," and the Idea said in a sketch of her:— "Mrs. Maitland is by nature a poet — one in whom the most natural form of expression is in rhyme and rhythm".

She married George Forbes Maitland (1835-1928), photographer, in Hamilton, Ontario on 4 February 1861, and they moved to Stratford, Ontario. After the death of a son, Maitland became depressed, which not only affected her health but her writing as well, with many of her subsequent poems being tinged with sadness.

Maitland's poems were collected and prepared for publication. A number of hymns written by Maitland were set to music.

== Personal life ==
Maitland and her husband had six children including, William James, Minnie Margaret, Marianne, Isabella "Belle" McDonald, Eleanor Lillian "Nellie", and George Herrie. She lived in Elgin, Scotland (1839-1857); Hamilton, Ontario (1861-1864); St. Catharines, Ontario (c1865-c1874); Buffalo, New York and New York City; Stratford, Ontario (1877, 1881, 1891, 1911); and St. Marys, Ontario (-1919). In religion, she was Baptist. She died 24 February 1919 at St. Marys, Ontario, at the age of 80.

== Selected works ==
- Autumn Leaves, 1907
- God Speed the True: a Little Volume of Cheerful Canadian Verse, 1919

=== Hymns ===
- "Keep a light in the window burning"
- "Today the saints in Zion are watching"
