= Frank Lindley =

Scottish footballer

Personal information
- Full name: Frank Louis Lindley
- Date of birth: 1885
- Place of birth: Sheffield, England
- Date of death: 1947 (aged 61–62)
- Height: 5 ft 9 in (1.75 m)
- Position: Outside right

Senior career*
Years	Team	Apps	(Gls)
- Midland Athletic
1910–1911	Dundee	13	(5)
1911–1912	Motherwell	24	(4)
1912–1913	Sheffield United	1	(0)
1913–1914	Newport County		
1914–1915	Luton Town	5	(0)
1916–1917	St Bernard's		
- * Club domestic league appearances and goals

Frank Louis Lindley (1885–1947) was an English professional footballer who played in the Scottish League for Motherwell and Dundee as an outside right. He made one appearance in the Football League for Sheffield United.

== Personal life ==
Lindley served in three battalions of the Middlesex Regiment during the First World War, most notably the 1st Football Battalion. He was posted to France in November 1915 and sustained a gunshot wound to the arm at Delville Wood in August 1916, which resulted in him being evacuated to Mater Infirmorum Hospital in Belfast. He returned to France in March 1917, but was sent to hospital in Sheffield with impetigo in July 1917.

== Career statistics ==
Appearances and goals by club, season and competition
Club	Season	League			National Cup		Total	
Club	Season	Division	Apps	Goals	Apps	Goals	Apps	Goals
Dundee	1910–11	Scottish First Division	13	5	1	0	14	5
Motherwell	1911–12	Scottish First Division	24	4	3	3	27	7
Luton Town	1914–15	Southern League First Division	5	0	0	0	5	0
Career total			42	9	4	3	46	12
