= Alex Chaplin =

Scottish footballer

Personal information
- Full name: Alexander Balfour Chaplin
- Date of birth: 6 February 1892
- Place of birth: Dundee, Scotland
- Date of death: 9 March 1986 (aged 94)
- Place of death: Fulham, England
- Height: 5 ft 10 in (1.78 m)
- Position: Full back

Senior career*
Years	Team	Apps	(Gls)
1914–1919	Dundee Hibernian	23	(0)
1919–1926	Fulham	259	(1)
1926–1929	Northfleet United		
- * Club domestic league appearances and goals

Alexander Balfour Chaplin (6 February 1892 – 9 March 1986) was a Scottish professional footballer who played as a full back.

== Football career ==
Born in Dundee, Chaplin started his career with Dundee Hibernian, signing for the club in May 1914. He played regularly during the 1914–15 season before volunteering for military service. He remained registered with Dundee Hibs throughout the First World War, but never played for the club again and was released in April 1919.

Upon recommendation from former Dundee Hibs manager, Pat Reilly, Alex joined Fulham in July 1919 and played with the club until 1926. He played 259 league matches for Fulham, scoring one goal and served as the club's captain from 1923 to 1926. He made 276 appearances in all competitions for the club, missing only 8 games in seven seasons.

After leaving Fulham, he played for Northfleet United for three years before retiring from playing.

== Personal life ==
His brothers were fellow professional players Jack Chaplin and George Chaplin.

After his retirement, he remained in the Fulham area until he died in 1986, serving as a local councillor and a member of the Labour Party.
