= Charles Webb (footballer) =

English footballer (1879-1939)

Personal information
- Date of birth: 4 March 1879
- Place of birth: Higham Ferrers, England
- Date of death: January 1939 (aged 59)
- Place of death: Wellingborough, England
- Height: 5 ft 6 in (1.68 m)
- Position: Outside right

Youth career
- Chesham Grenadiers
- Higham Ferrers

Senior career*
Years	Team	Apps	(Gls)
1898–1900	Rushden		
1900–1901	Kettering		
1901–1902	Leicester Fosse	32	(3)
1902–1903	Wellingborough		
1903–1904	Kettering		
1904–1905	Southampton	16	(5)
1905–1908	Dundee		
1908–1909	Manchester City	22	(3)
1909–19??	Airdrieonians		
- * Club domestic league appearances and goals

Charles Webb (4 March 1879 – January 1939) was an English footballer who played at outside left for various clubs in England and Scotland in the 1900s.

== Football career ==
Webb was born in Higham Ferrers, Northamptonshire and trained as a harness-maker. After playing football for his village team, he joined Rushden of the Midland League in 1898. After two seasons with Rushden, in 1900 he moved to Kettering who had just been admitted to the Southern League as Midland League champions.

Kettering finished their inaugural season in the Southern League 11th in the table. In the FA Cup, Kettering defeated Chesterfield of the Football League Second Division in the first round, with Webb scoring both Kettering goals in the replay (won 2–1 aet), only to be defeated 5–0 in the next round by Middlesbrough.

His cup exploits brought him to the attention of Leicester Fosse of the Football League Second Division who signed him in May 1901. Webb played in all but two of Leicester's league and cup matches in the 1901–02 season, scoring three goals. It was at Filbert Street that he first teamed up with Bert Dainty, with whom he was later to play at Southampton (1904–1905) and Dundee (1905–1908). At the end of the season, he returned to the Southern League to join Wellingborough where he spent a season, followed by a year back at Kettering, before moving to the Southern League champions, Southampton, in May 1904 to replace Dick Evans who had been forced to retire through ill health and injuries.

Webb joined the "Saints" with a reputation as a "brilliant wing man (who) had a fine turn of speed, with his centres and long shots being particular features of his play". He made his debut in the opening match of the 1904–05 season, a 2–1 victory a Luton Town. During his one season at The Dell, Webb was in and out of the side making a total of 19 first-team appearances with five goals, with former England international Archie Turner competing with him for the outside-right berth.

In the summer of 1905, Dundee made him an "irresistible offer" to move to Dens Park along with his former Leicester and Southampton teammate Bert Dainty. Webb remained with Dundee for three seasons, helping them to the runners-up position in the Scottish Football League in 1906–07.

In March 1908, he returned to England to join Manchester City of the Football League First Division, where he played the last eleven matches of the 1907–08 season, scoring three goals to help City reach third in the table. He remained at Maine Road until the end of the next season, when City were relegated, although he only made eleven appearances, as cover for George Dorsett.

In June 1909, Webb moved back to Scotland, where he played out his career with Airdrieonians.

== Later career ==
After retiring from his football career, Webb managed a large bakery business in Rushden, back in Northamptonshire, close to where he was born.

== Honours ==
Dundee

- Scottish Football League runners-up: 1906–07
