= James Comrie =

Scottish footballer (1881–1916)

Personal information
- Full name: James Comrie
- Date of birth: 31 March 1881
- Place of birth: Denny, Scotland
- Date of death: 9 August 1916 (aged 35)
- Place of death: near Méteren, France
- Position: Centre half

Senior career*
Years	Team	Apps	(Gls)
–1904	Dunipace Juniors		
1904–1906	Third Lanark	54	(15)
1906–1907	Reading	36	(1)
1907–1908	Glossop	38	(1)
1908–1910	Bradford City	48	(3)
1910–1911	Lincoln City	12	(1)
1911	Grantham Town	1	(0)
1911–1912	Stenhousemuir		
1912–1915	Reading	128	(2)

International career
	Southern League XI	2	
- * Club domestic league appearances and goals

James Comrie (31 March 1881 – 9 August 1916), sometimes known as Jock Comrie, was a Scottish professional footballer who played in the Football League for Bradford City, Glossop and Lincoln City as a centre half.

== Personal life ==
Comrie's younger brother George, cousin John and nephew Malcolm were also footballers. While a part-time footballer with Lincoln City, he worked as an attendant at Bracebridge Pauper Lunatic Asylum. In 1915, during the second year of the First World War, Comrie enlisted as a private in the Northumberland Fusiliers. He died of wounds inflicted by a German trench mortar on 9 August 1916 near Méteren, France, during the Battle of the Somme. Comrie is commemorated on the Menin Gate.

== Honours ==
Third Lanark

- Scottish Cup: 1904–05

== Career statistics ==
Appearances and goals by club, season and competition
Club	Season	League			National Cup		Other		Total	
Club	Season	Division	Apps	Goals	Apps	Goals	Apps	Goals	Apps	Goals
Third Lanark	1903–04	Scottish League Division One	4	1	0	0	1 (Note: Appearance in Glasgow Merchants Charity Cup)	0	5	1
Third Lanark	1904–05	Scottish League Division One	24	3	6	1	3 (Note: 2 appearances in Glasgow Merchants Charity Cup, 1 appearance in Glasgow Cup)	0	33	4
Third Lanark	1905–06	Scottish League Division One	26	11	7	2	1 (Note: Appearance in Glasgow Cup)	0	32	13
Third Lanark	Total		54	15	13	3	5	0	72	18
Reading	1906–07	Southern League First Division	36	1	1	0	—		37	1
Glossop	1907–08	Second Division	35	1	2	0	—		37	1
Glossop	1908–09	Second Division	3	0	—		—		3	0
Glossop	Total		38	1	2	0	—		40	1
Bradford City	1908–09	First Division	12	1	3	0	—		15	1
Bradford City	1909–10	First Division	31	2	2	0	—		33	2
Bradford City	Total		43	3	5	0	—		48	3
Lincoln City	1910–11	Second Division	12	1	0	0	—		12	1
Grantham	1911–12	Central Alliance	1	0	—		—		1	0
Reading	1912–13	Southern League First Division	36	0	0	0	—		36	0
Reading	1913–14	Southern League First Division	22	1	0	0	—		22	1
Reading	1914–15	Southern League First Division	34	0	0	0	—		34	0
Reading	Total		128	2	1	0	—		129	2
Career total			276	22	21	3	5	0	302	25
