= 1909–10 Scottish Cup =

Tournament details
- Country: Scotland

Final positions
- Champions: Dundee
- Runners-up: Clyde

The 1909–10 Scottish Cup was the 37th season of Scotland's most prestigious football knockout competition.

The cup was won by Dundee who defeated Clyde 2–0 in the second replay final, after drawing 2–2 and 0–0. As of 2025, it is the only time the club has won the trophy in its 132-year history, with the 115-year period since a last victory - including final defeats in 1925, 1952, 1964 and 2003 – exceeding that of Hibernian (114 years between 1902 and 2016).

== Calendar ==
| Round | First match date | Fixtures | Clubs |
|---|---|---|---|
| First Round | 22 January 1910 | 16 | 32 → 16 |
| Second Round | 5 February 1910 | 8 | 16 → 8 |
| Quarter-finals | 19 February 1910 | 4 | 8 → 4 |
| Semi-finals | 12 March 1910 | 2 | 4 → 2 |
| Final | 9 April 1910 | 1 | 2 → 1 |

== First round ==
| Home team | Score | Away team |
|---|---|---|
| Aberdeen | ~~2 – 2~~ | Bo'ness |
| Ayr | 3 – 2 | Alloa Athletic |
| Bathgate | 0 – 4 | Heart of Midlothian |
| Douglas Wanderers | 0 – 6 | Airdrieonians |
| Dumbarton | 1 – 2 | Celtic |
| East Fife | 4 – 1 | Hurlford |
| Falkirk | 3 – 0 | Port Glasgow Athletic |
| Hamilton Academical | 0 – 0 | Hibernian |
| Kilmarnock | 0 – 0 | Third Lanark |
| Leith Athletic | 0 – 1 | Clyde |
| Morton | 4 – 3 | Partick Thistle |
| Motherwell | 1 – 0 | Forfar Athletic |
| Queen's Park | 0 – 0 | Kirkcaldy United |
| Rangers | 5 – 1 | Inverness Thistle |
| St Mirren | 8 – 0 | Elgin City |

=== Repeat ===
| Home team | Score | Away team |
|---|---|---|
| Aberdeen | 3 – 0 | Bo'ness |

=== Replays ===
| Home team | Score | Away team |
|---|---|---|
| Dundee | 1 – 0 | Beith |
| Hibernian | 2 – 0 | Hamilton Academical |
| Queen's Park | 6 – 1 | Kirkcaldy United |
| Third Lanark | ~~6 – 1~~ | Kilmarnock |

==== Repeat Replay ====
| Home team | Score | Away team |
|---|---|---|
| Third Lanark | 2 – 0 | Kilmarnock |

== Second round ==
| Home team | Score | Away team |
|---|---|---|
| Aberdeen | 3 – 0 | Airdrieonians |
| Ayr | 0 – 1 | Hibernian |
| Celtic | 3 – 1 | Third Lanark |
| Clyde | 2 – 0 | Rangers |
| Dundee | 3 – 0 | Falkirk |
| East Fife | 2 – 3 | Queen's Park |
| Motherwell | 3 – 0 | Morton |
| St Mirren | 2 – 2 | Heart of Midlothian |

=== Replay ===
| Home team | Score | Away team |
|---|---|---|
| St Mirren | 0 – 0 | Heart of Midlothian |

==== Second replay ====
| Home team | Score | Away team |
|---|---|---|
| Heart of Midlothian | 4 – 0 | St Mirren |

== Quarter-finals ==
| Home team | Score | Away team |
|---|---|---|
| Celtic | 2 – 1 | Aberdeen |
| Hibernian | ~~0 – 1~~ | Heart of Midlothian |
| Queen's Park | 2 – 2 | Clyde |
| Motherwell | 1 – 3 | Dundee |

=== Replays ===
| Home team | Score | Away team |
|---|---|---|
| Clyde | 2 – 2 | Queen's Park |
| Heart of Midlothian | 0 – 1 | Hibernian |

==== Second replay ====
| Home team | Score | Away team |
|---|---|---|
| Clyde | 1-0 | Queen's Park |

== Semi-finals ==
12 March 1910

| Clyde | 3–1 | Celtic |

Attendance: 40,000

12 March 1910

| Hibernian | 0–0 | Dundee |

Attendance: 17,000

=== Replay ===
19 March 1910

| Dundee | 0–0 | Hibernian |

Attendance: 23,000

==== Second Replay ====
23 March 1910

| Dundee | 1–0 | Hibernian |

Celtic Park, Glasgow
Attendance: 20,000

== Final ==
9 April 1910

| Dundee | 2–2 | Clyde |
|---|---|---|
| Hunter 87'; Langlands 90' | | Chalmers; Booth |

Ibrox Park, Govan
Attendance: 60,000

=== Replay ===
16 April 1910

| Dundee | 0–0 (a.e.t.) | Clyde |

Ibrox Park, Govan
Attendance: 25,000

==== Second Replay ====
20 April 1910

| Dundee | 2–1 | Clyde |
|---|---|---|
| Bellamy 15'; Hunter 56' | | Chalmers 3' |

Ibrox Park, Govan
Attendance: 24,000

=== Teams ===
Clyde:
| GK | George McTurk |
| RB | Alex Watson |
| LB | Jimmy Blair |
| RH | William Walker |
| CH | Tom McAteer |
| LH | George Robertson |
| OR | Jock Stirling |
| IR | William McCartney |
| CF | Jackie Chalmers |
| IL | John Jackson |
| OL | Frank Booth |
| Replay: | Unchanged |
| 2nd Replay: | John Wyllie and Charles Wise replaced Stirling and Jackson |

Dundee:
| GK | Bob Crumley |
| RB | Jimmy Lawson |
| LB | Jack Chaplin |
| RH | Bert Lee |
| CH | Herbert Dainty |
| LH | George Comrie |
| OR | Jim Bellamy |
| IR | George Langlands |
| CF | John 'Sailor' Hunter |
| IL | Sandy MacFarlane |
| OL | Jack Fraser |
| Replay: | Bert Neal replaced Lawson |
| 2nd Replay: | Neal kept place, Bob McEwan replaced Chaplin |

== See also ==
- 1909–10 in Scottish football
