= Robert Hamilton (Scottish footballer) =

Scottish footballer (1877–1948)

Personal information
- Full name: Robert Cumming Hamilton
- Date of birth: 13 May 1877
- Place of birth: Elgin, Scotland
- Date of death: 2 May 1948 (aged 70)
- Place of death: Elgin, Scotland
- Position: Centre forward

Senior career*
Years	Team	Apps	(Gls)
- Elgin City
1896–1897	Queen's Park	0	(0)
1897–1906	Rangers	164	(154)
1906–1907	Fulham	29	(11)
1907–1908	Rangers	11	(3)
1908	Heart of Midlothian	5	(1)
1908–1910	Morton	52	(25)
1910–1913	Dundee	93	(37)
- Elgin City
Total		354	(231)

International career
1899–1911	Scotland	11	(15)
1898–1904	Scottish Football League XI	7	(9)
- * Club domestic league appearances and goals

Robert Cumming Hamilton (13 May 1877 – 2 May 1948) was a Scottish international footballer who played as a Centre forward and was known for his prolific scoring record and his ten-season association with Rangers.

== Playing career ==
=== Club ===
Hamilton started his football career with the local side Elgin City in the Highland League. He relocated to Glasgow in 1896 to attend the city's University and joined Queen's Park. A year later, he joined the Rangers until 1907, earning a reputation as a potent goal-scorer who was remarkably accurate from long range.

Hamilton played every match, was top scorer and captained the team during the 1898–99 season, in which they won every league match. He earned further League winners' medals in 1899–1900, 1900–01 and 1901–02 and was part of Rangers' Scottish Cup-winning sides in 1898 and 1903. He became Rangers' all-time top scorer against rivals Celtic during his time at Ibrox, was the club's top goalscorer for nine consecutive seasons and the highest overall in Scottish League Division One on six occasions (including two shared awards), his highest total being 28 from 24 appearances in 1903–04.

Hamilton moved south of the border to join Fulham in May 1906, helping them to win the 1906–07 Southern League title, before returning to Rangers a year later. He left the Govan club for a second time in 1908, briefly moving to Heart of Midlothian before joining Morton. He signed for Dundee at the end of the 1909–10 season, too late to be involved in the side which defeated Clyde to win the Scottish Cup, Dundee's first, that year. After three full seasons and part of a fourth at Dens Park, he returned to first club Elgin City in 1913 where he finally retired.

=== International ===
Hamilton won a total of eleven caps for Scotland between 1899 and 1911, scoring fifteen goals, four of which came in Scotland's 11–0 win over Ireland in 1901, their biggest ever margin of victory. He was also selected seven times for the Scottish League representative side, scoring nine goals.

== Post-football ==
After retiring from football, Hamilton went into education, and after graduating from the University of Glasgow, he became a school teacher, then eventually a master. He maintained an involvement in education throughout his life and eventually served on the Moray and Nairn Education Board in the mid-1930s. He was also involved in local politics, serving on the Elgin Town council between 1914 and 1937. For the last six years of this period, he was the Provost of Elgin. Hamilton died in May 1948, aged 71. In the late 1950s/early 1960s a new road in a private housing estate overlooking the River Lossie at the north side of Elgin was named after him as Hamilton Drive, which remains today.

== Career statistics ==
=== Club ===
Appearances and goals by club, season and competition
Club	Season	League			Cup		Other		Total	
Club	Season	Division	Apps	Goals	Apps	Goals	Apps	Goals	Apps	Goals
Rangers	1897–98	SFL	15	17	7	8	13	15	35	40
Rangers	1898–99	SFL	18	21	5	4	8	7	31	32
Rangers	1899–1900	SFL	16	17	4	6	15	9	35	32
Rangers	1900–01	SFL	19	20	1	0	15	12	35	32
Rangers	1901–02	SFL	16	9	2	0	7	3	25	12
Rangers	1902–03	SFL	19	13	7	5	7	4	33	22
Rangers	1903–04	SFL	24	29	4	3	3	0	31	32
Rangers	1904–05	SFL	17	19	1	0	4	2	22	21
Rangers	1905–06	SFL	20	9	3	1	3	0	26	10
Rangers	Total		175	157	34	27	77	52	286	236
Fulham	1906–07	Southern FL	29	11	0	0	0	0	29	11
Rangers	1907–08	SFL	11	3	0	0	2	0	13	3
Hearts	1907–08	SFL	5	1	1	0	0	0	6	1
Morton	1908–09	SFL	26	13	1	0	0	0	27	13
Morton	1909–10	SFL	26	12	4	2	0	0	30	14
Morton	Total	SFL	52	25	5	2	0	0	57	27
Dundee	1910–11	SFL	31	17	4	3	0	0	35	20
Dundee	1911–12	SFL	30	14	3	1	0	0	33	15
Dundee	1912–13	SFL	28	4	5	3	0	0	33	7
Dundee	1913–14	SFL	4	2	0	0	0	0	4	2
Dundee	Total		93	37	12	7	0	0	105	44
Career total			354	231	52	36	77	52	483	319

=== International ===
Appearances and goals by national team and year
National team	Year	Apps	Goals
Scotland	1899	3	3
Scotland	1900	1	1
Scotland	1901	2	5
Scotland	1902	2	3
Scotland	1903	1	0
Scotland	1904	1	1
Scotland	1911	1	2
Total		11	15

Scores and results list Scotland's goal tally first, the score column indicates the score after each Hamilton goal.

List of international goals scored by Robert Hamilton
No.	Date	Venue	Opponent	Score	Result	Competition	Ref.
1	24 March 1899	Celtic Park, Glasgow, Scotland	Ireland	3-0	9-1	Friendly	
2	24 March 1899	Celtic Park, Glasgow, Scotland	Ireland	7-1	9-1	Friendly	
3	7 April 1899	Villa Park, Birmingham, England	England	1-2	1-2	Friendly	
4	2 February 1900	Pittodrie Stadium, Aberdeen, Scotland	Wales	4-0	5-2	Friendly	
5	22 February 1901	Celtic Park, Glasgow, Scotland	Ireland	7-0	11-0	Friendly	
6	22 February 1901	Celtic Park, Glasgow, Scotland	Ireland	8-0	11-0	Friendly	
7	22 February 1901	Celtic Park, Glasgow, Scotland	Ireland	10-0	11-0	Friendly	
8	22 February 1901	Celtic Park, Glasgow, Scotland	Ireland	11-0	11-0	Friendly	
9	29 March 1901	Crystal Palace Stadium, London, England	England	2-1	2-2	Friendly	
10	1 March 1902	Grosvenor Park, Belfast, Ireland	Ireland	1-0	5-1	Friendly	
11	1 March 1902	Grosvenor Park, Belfast, Ireland	Ireland	3-0	5-1	Friendly	
12	1 March 1902	Grosvenor Park, Belfast, Ireland	Ireland	4-0	5-1	Friendly	
13	26 March 1904	Dalymount Park, Dublin, Ireland	Ireland	1-0	1-1	Friendly	
14	6 March 1911	Ninian Park, Cardiff, Wales	Wales	1-1	2-2	Friendly	
15	6 March 1911	Ninian Park, Cardiff, Wales	Wales	2-2	2-2	Friendly	

== See also ==
- List of footballers in Scotland by number of league goals (200+)
- List of Scotland national football team captains
- List of Scotland national football team hat-tricks
