= John Comrie (footballer) =

Scottish footballer

Personal information
- Full name: John Comrie
- Place of birth: Scotland
- Position: Half back

Senior career*
Years	Team	Apps	(Gls)
1909–1912	Dundee	6	(0)
1912–1915	Reading		
1915–1916	Armadale		
1916	→ Airdrieonians (loan)	15	(0)
1916–1918	Airdrieonians	33	(0)
1920	King's Park		
- * Club domestic league appearances and goals

James Comrie was a Scottish professional footballer who played in the Scottish League for Airdrieonians and Dundee as a half back. He also played in the Southern League for Reading.

== Personal life ==
Comrie's relatives George, James and Malcolm were also footballers.

== Career statistics ==
Appearances and goals by club, season and competition
Club	Season	League			National Cup		Total	
Club	Season	Division	Apps	Goals	Apps	Goals	Apps	Goals
Dundee	1909–10	Scottish First Division	5	0	0	0	5	0
Dundee	1910–11	Scottish First Division	1	0	0	0	1	0
Dundee	Total		6	0	0	0	6	0
Airdrieonians (loan)	1915–16	Scottish First Division	15	0	―		15	0
Airdrieonians	1916–17	Scottish First Division	26	0	―		26	0
Airdrieonians	1917–18	Scottish First Division	7	0	―		7	0
Airdrieonians	Total		48	0	―		48	0
Career total			54	0	0	0	54	0
