= Archie Lindsay =

Scottish footballer

Personal information
- Full name: Archibald Lindsay
- Date of birth: 1882
- Place of birth: Rosneath, Scotland
- Position: Left back

Senior career*
Years	Team	Apps	(Gls)
1902–1903	Rutherglen Glencairn		
1903–1904	Parkhead Albion		
1904–1905	Renton		
1905–1907	Reading		
1907–1910	Fulham	78	(1)
1911–1912	Dundee	32	(1)
1912	Third Lanark	0	(0)
1912–1914	St Johnstone	45	(1)
1914–1915	Lochgelly United	9	(0)
1915–	St Johnstone		
–1919	Lochgelly YMCA		
- * Club domestic league appearances and goals

Archibald Lindsay was a Scottish professional footballer who played as a left back in the Football League for Fulham. He also played in the Scottish League for St Johnstone, Dundee and Lochgelly United.

== Personal life ==
Lindsay served as a private in the Black Watch during the First World War.

== Honours ==
St Johnstone

- Consolation Cup: 1913–14

== Career statistics ==
Appearances and goals by club, season and competition
Club	Season	League			National Cup		Other		Total	
Club	Season	Division	Apps	Goals	Apps	Goals	Apps	Goals	Apps	Goals
Dundee	1910–11	Scottish First Division	9	1	4	0	―		13	1
Dundee	1911–12	Scottish First Division	23	0	―		―		23	0
Dundee	Total		32	1	4	0	―		36	1
Third Lanark	1911–12	Scottish First Division	0	0	1	0	―		1	0
St Johnstone	1912–13	Scottish Second Division	24	1	6	0	―		30	1
St Johnstone	1913–14	Scottish Second Division	21	0	―		8 (Note: Appearances in Scottish Qualifying Cup)	0	29	0
St Johnstone	Total		45	1	6	0	8	0	59	1
Lochgelly United	1914–15	Scottish Second Division	9	0	―		8	0	17	0
Career total			86	2	11	0	16	0	113	2
