= List of provosts of Elgin =

The Provost of Elgin was the head of the Elgin burgh council in Scotland. Provosts were elected by the council and served not only as the chairman of that body, but as a figurehead for the town.

Elgin Town Council ceased to exist in May 1975, its duties being taken over by Moray District Council and Grampian Regional Council.

Each of the 32 Scottish local authorities elects a convener or provost, but it is only the four main cities, Glasgow, Edinburgh, Aberdeen and Dundee that have a Lord Provost. This is enshrined in the Local Government etc. (Scotland) Act 1994.

Elgin Town Council decided to call the royal burgh a city in the mid 19th century. The provost of a city is entitled to the title “lord provost”. However, Elgin’s claim to be a city was never ratified by either the Lord Lyon or the Convention of Royal Burghs. In spite of this the council retained the title of lord provost for their chief magistrate.

== Provosts ==
- 1261 Thomas Wyseman
- 1272 Adam son of Stephen and Patrick Heroc
- 1330 Walter son of Ralph
- 1343 Walter son of Ralph
- 1488 James Douglas
- 1521–1525 David Douglas of Pittendreich
- 1529–1530 William Douglas
- 1538-1539 William Gaderer (or Gatherer)
- 1539-1540 John Young
- 1540-1542 William Gaderer
- 1542-1543 John Young
- 1543-1547 William Gaderer
- 1547-1548 St Giles
- 1548-1549 William Hay of Mayne
- 1549-1553 Alexander Innes
- 1553-1554 William Innes
- 1554-1557 Alexander Douglas
- 1557-1558 William Gaderar
- 1559-1561 Alexander Douglas
- 1565-1568 John Annand
- 1568-1569 Alexander Douglas
- 1569-1574 John Annand of Morristoun
- 1574-1575 Alexander Douglas
- 1575-1583 John Annand
- 1583-1584 Thomas Young
- 1584-1585 James Douglas of Shutting Acres
- 1585-1586 John Annand
- 1586-1587 James Douglas
- 1589-1594 John Annand
- 1594-1600 Alexander Seton, Lord Urquhart & Baron of Fyvie
- 1600-1601 James Douglas of Shutting Acres
- 1601-1607 Alexander Seton, 1st Earl of Dunfermline
- 1609-1610 James Douglas of Barflethills
- 1610-1611 Alexander Pringhill
- 1611-1612 James Rutherford
- 1612-1613 Alexander Pringhill
- 1613-1615 James Douglas of Barflethills
- 1615-1623 James Rutherford
- 1623-1631 Gavin Douglas of Shutting Acres
- 1631-1643 John Hay
- 1643-1645 Gavin Douglas of Morristoun
- 1645-1650 John Hay
- 1650-1653 John Douglas of Morristoun
- 1653-1655 John Hay
- 1655-1658 John Douglas of Morristoun
- 1658-1664 George Cumming of Lochtervandich
- 1664-1665 William Cumming of Banff
- 1665-1668 Thomas Calder
- 1668-1687 George Cumming of Lochtervandich
- 1688-1689 David Stewart
- 1689-1690 William Calder of Spynie
- 1690-1700 William King of Newmill
- 1700-1705 James, Lord Duffus
- 1705-1708 William Sutherland of Mostowie
- 1708-1711 William King of Newmill
- 1711-1714 George Innes of Inkinty
- 1714-1717 Sir Archibald Dunbar of Thunderton
- 1717-1720 Robert Innes MD
- 1720-1723 James Innes MD
- 1723-1726 Robert Innes MD
- 1726-1729 James Innes MD
- 1729-1731 James Anderson of Linkwood (d.1731)
- 1731-1734 James Innes MD
- 1734-1737 John Robertson MD
- 1737-1740 James Innes, MD
- 1740-1743 William Anderson of Linkwood
- 1743-1746 James Stephen, Merchant
- 1746-1749 John Duff Sr, Merchant
- 1749-1752 Alexander Brodie of Windyhills
- 1752-1755 James Robertson of Bishopmill
- 1755-1758 Alexander Brodie of Windyhills
- 1758-1761 James Robertson of Bishopmill
- 1761-1764 Alexander Brodie of Windyhills
- 1764-1767 James Robertson of Bishopmill
- 1767-1770 Alexander Brodie of Windyhills
- 1770-1771 Thomas Stephen, Merchant
- 1771-1774 John Duff, Merchant
- 1774-1775 Alexander Brodie of Windyhills
- 1775-1778 John Duff, Merchant
- 1778-1779 Alexander Brodie of Windyhills
- 1779-1782 John Duff, Merchant
- 1782-1785 George Brown, Linkwood
- 1785-1788 John Duff, Merchant
- 1788-1791 George Brown, Linkwood
- 1791-1792 John Duff, Merchant
- 1792-1795 Alexander Brander, Merchant
- 1795-1798 George Brown, Linkwood
- 1798-1799 Alexander Brander, Merchant
- 1799-1802 George Brown, Linkwood
- 1802-1803 Joseph King of Newmill
- 1803-1806 George Brown, Linkwood
- 1806-1809 Joseph King of Newmill
- 1809-1812 George Brown, Linkwood
- 1812-1815 George Fenton, Writer
- 1815-1816 George Brown, Linkwood
- 1816-1819 Colonel Francis William Grant, MP
- 1819-1820 Sir Archibald Dunbar of Northfield, Baronet
- 1820-1823 Alexander Innes, Merchant
- 1823-1826 Peter Nicholson, Merchant
- 1826-1829 Alexander Innes, Merchant
- 1829-1832 John Lawson, Jr, Banker
- 1832-1833 James Petrie, Merchant

This was the last election under the old system; the Reform Bill having come into operation at the election in November 1833.

- 1833-1835 William Gauldie, Merchant
- 1835-1839 John McKimmie, Merchant
- 1839-1840 Alexander Young, Banker
- 1840-1842 John McKimmie, Merchant
- 1842-1848 James Wilson
- 1848–1863 James Grant, solicitor
- 1863-1869 Alexander Russell, Publisher
- 1869-1875 Alexander Cameron of Mainhouse
- 1875-1881 William Culbard, Merchant
- 1881-1890 James Black, Publisher
- 1890-1896 William Law, Ironmonger
- 1896-1899 William Grant, Banker
- 1899-1905 John Young, Chemist
- 1905-1908 James Christie, Merchant
- 1908-1913 Charles Duff Wilson, Jeweller
- 1919-1925 William Ramsay of Longmorn
- 1925-1931 John Wittet
- 1931-1937 Robert Cumming Hamilton
- 1937-1940 Murdo Mackenzie
- 1940-1942 Charles Alexander Christie
- 1942-1949 Edward Stroud Harrison
- 1949-1952 John Brodie
- 1952-1955 Ronald Grant Fraser
- 1955-1961 William Batchen Munro
- 1961-1964 Isobel Ann Duncan
- 1964-1970 George Alexander Smith
- 1970-1971 George Edgar
- 1971-1975 Donald McLeman McIntosh
