= Alf Dean =

English footballer (1877–1959)

Personal information
- Date of birth: 2 January 1877
- Place of birth: West Bromwich, England
- Date of death: 1 January 1959 aged 81
- Position: Winger

Senior career*
Years	Team	Apps	(Gls)
1894–1896	Walsall	0	(0)
1896–1898	West Bromwich Albion	7	(3)
1898–1901	Walsall	65	(29)
1901–1901	Nottingham Forest	7	(0)
1901–1902	Grimsby Town	17	(1)
1902–1905	Bristol City	84	(35)
1905–1906	Swindon Town	34	(10)
1906–1907	Millwall Athletic	36	(7)
1907–1908	Dundee	18	(10)
1908–1909	Millwall Athletic	24	(8)
1909–1914	Wellington Town	??	(??)
Total		292	(103)
- * Club domestic league appearances and goals

Alfred Dean (2 January 1877 – 1 January 1959) was an English professional association football player in the years prior to the First World War. He made over 180 appearances in the Football League, 18 appearances in the Scottish League and over 90 appearances in the Southern League.

== Career ==
Born in West Bromwich, Alf Dean was a short in stature 5 ft 5 ins (1.65 m) but not negligible 11 st (69.8 kg) nippy diminutive outside right with great dribbling skills. He was educated at West Bromwich Baptist school and played for Tantany Rangers and West Bromwich Standard before he began his professional career with Walsall in 1894 but failed to make an impression and left to join his hometown club West Bromwich Albion in May 1896. Returning to Walsall in September 1898 Dean finished as second top scorer with 13 goals in 30 appearances in 1898–99 as Walsall finished 6th of 18 clubs in the Second Division. This included two hat tricks on 12 Nov 1898 in 6–1 win v Gainsborough Trinity and on 4 Mar 1899 in 10–0 win v Darwen. Dean began the following season 1899–1900 as outside right and finished as centre forward scoring 5 goals in 12 appearances. He was the highest scorer for Walsall in 1900–01 playing as centre forward scoring 11 goals in 23 appearances before a transfer to Nottingham Forest for £120 in February 1901. Dean also scored five goals in Walsall's 6–0 FA Cup win over Wellington Town on 8 Dec 1900. In a short spell at Nottingham Forest Dean made only seven appearances. In May 1901 he moved to Grimsby Town where he spent a single season in the First Division making 17 appearances at outside right scoring once before moving on to play for Bristol City in the Second Division. He made 25 appearances at outside right and finished second top scorer with 10 goals, including goals in all of his first four matches, in 1902–03 for the "Robins" who finished 4th. Bristol City also finished 4th in each of the next two seasons with Dean contributing 13 goals, joint top scorer, from 32 appearances in 1903–04 and 12 goals from 27 appearances in 1904–05 before joining Swindon Town of the Southern League in July 1905. After a season with Swindon he opted to join Millwall Athletic also of the Southern League in May 1906. Playing on the right wing he scored 8 goals in 36 appearances in 1906–07 as Millwall finished 7th of 20 clubs in the Southern League. A year later the much travelled Dean then spent 1907–08 in Scotland with Dundee in the Scottish First Division but returned to Millwall Athletic in May 1908 for a single season. Playing on the right wing Dean scored 8 goals in 23 appearances as Millwall finished 13th of 21 clubs in the Southern League. The club where Alf Dean finished his nomadic career was Wellington Town whom he joined in July 1909.

After retiring in 1914 Alf Dean ran a pub in Walsall.
