= Kirkcaldy United F.C. =

Former association football club in Scotland

Kirkcaldy United
- Full name: Kirkcaldy United Football Club
- Nicknames: the United, the Fifers
- Founded: 1901
- Dissolved: 1916
- Ground: Scott's Park
- Capacity: 12,000
Home colours

Kirkcaldy United Football Club was a football club from Kirkcaldy in Scotland.

== History ==
The club was founded as Kirkcaldy Amateurs at the start of the 1901–02 season, in the aftermath of the failure of Kirkcaldy F.C., one of the town's two senior clubs. The other, Raith Rovers, was elected to the Scottish League in 1902, which immediately made the prospects of another senior club surviving in the town much more difficult. Nevertheless, in 1903, the club turned professional under the name Kirkcaldy United; the club president, Robert Sinclair, became the president of the new Fife Football Association, also set up the same year, which split from the Eastern Association and affiliated directly with the Scottish Football Association.

The club joined the Northern League in 1904, and, in its first season as a member, won through to the fourth round of the Scottish Qualifying Cup, which entitled it to play in the first round proper of the Scottish Cup. In the first round, the club beat Crieff Morrisonians 3–1, coming from 1–0 down and missing a first-half penalty, before an equalizer from Fisher in the 70th minute and two late goals within a minute from Shaw and Cowie put the United into the second round. In the second round, at home to First Leaguers Partick Thistle, the United held out until a quarter of an hour to go, including withstanding a missed penalty, when Gray scored the only goal of the game; the United was handicapped by regular goalkeeper Dorward being injured before the match and Young, a junior at Vale of Wemyss, stepped in. The club only won through to the main stages of the Scottish Cup twice more, in 1909–10 and 1913–14, losing in its only ties to Queen's Park and Stevenston United respectively, although the club did hold Queen's Park to a surprise 0–0 draw at Hampden Park, thanks to the heroics of Dorward in goal.

After two mid-table seasons in the Northern League, the club had a banner year in 1906–07. It won the 8-team Fife Cup for the first time, beating Cowdenbeath 3–1 in the final at Stark's Park in front of 2,160 people; the strength of the tournament being demonstrated by each of the other teams being Scottish League members present or future. The same season, the club won the Northern League, jointly with the Dundee 'A' (i.e. reserve) side. The United had finished its fixtures one point clear of Dundee, who had not been able to play the newly-defunct Hearts of Beath; after expunging all fixtures, the United and Dundee were level on points, and the Fifeshire FA agreed to award the title jointly to the pair. Possibly as a result of this success, Raith Rovers proposed a merger of the two Kirkcaldy sides in 1908, but it did not proceed.

In 1909 the club was one of several of the Northern League sides which joined the Central League, a de facto third division in Scotland, which, between 1909 and 1915, featured 21 teams in total; three were reserve sides, and 17 of the other 18 would end up as members of the Scottish League. The only club which never made it was Kirkcaldy United. The United did apply in 1912–13, when runner-up in the Central League, and having won the Fife Cup a second time by beating East Fife 5–2 in the final, but the two clubs facing re-election were both re-elected.

Kircaldy United went into abeyance in 1916, pending the end of World War 1, but was never revived.

== Colours ==
The club originally played in black and white, changing to blue and white in 1913.

== Grounds ==
They played their early games in Steedman's Park, moving to an open field at Overton Park in 1903. In 1905 they moved into their new home, a purpose-built park named Scott's Park, and brought the fixtures and fittings over with them. It was situated at the corner of Factory Road and Kidd Street. After World War 1 this section of Factory Road was renamed Beatty Crescent.

The record crowd at Scott's Park was 12,000, for the 1909–10 Scottish Cup first round replay tie with Queen's Park, which the visitors won 6–1, the scores having been level at 1–1 at half-time.
