= George Comrie =

Scottish footballer

Personal information
- Full name: George Smart Comrie
- Date of birth: 31 March 1885
- Place of birth: Denny, Scotland
- Date of death: 15 April 1958 (aged 73)
- Place of death: Falkirk, Scotland
- Position: Left half

Senior career*
Years	Team	Apps	(Gls)
1903–1904	Dunipace Athletic		
1904–1905	Third Lanark	0	(0)
1905–1909	Millwall		
1909–1912	Dundee	76	(5)
1912–1913	Huddersfield Town	15	(0)
- Forfar Athletic
- * Club domestic league appearances and goals

George Smart Comrie (31 March 1885 – 15 April 1958) was a Scottish professional footballer who played in the Scottish League for Dundee as a left half and was a member of the club's 1909–10 Scottish Cup-winning team. He also played in the Southern League for Millwall and the Football League for Huddersfield Town.

== Personal life ==
Comrie's relatives James, John and Malcolm were also footballers. Comrie served as a sergeant in the Black Watch during the First World War and his son Daniel served with the Scots Guards during the Second World War.

== Career statistics ==
Appearances and goals by club, season and competition
Club	Season	League			National cup (Note: Includes Scottish Cup, FA Cup)		Total	
Club	Season	Division	Apps	Goals	Apps	Goals	Apps	Goals
Dundee	1909–10	Scottish First Division	22	0	10	1	32	1
Dundee	1910–11	Scottish First Division	26	2	4	1	30	3
Dundee	1911–12	Scottish First Division	28	3	3	0	31	3
Dundee	Total		76	5	17	2	93	7
Huddersfield Town	1912–13	Second Division	15	0	0	0	15	0
Career total			101	5	17	2	108	7

== Honours ==
Dundee

- Scottish Cup: 1909–10
