= Malcolm Comrie =

Scottish footballer

Personal information
- Full name: Malcolm Comrie
- Date of birth: 28 June 1906
- Place of birth: Denny, Scotland
- Date of death: 1992 (aged 86)
- Place of death: Denny, Scotland
- Height: 5 ft 8 in (1.73 m)
- Position: Inside forward

Senior career*
Years	Team	Apps	(Gls)
- Dunipace Juniors
–1931	Denny Hibernian		
1931–1932	Brentford	0	(0)
1932–1934	Manchester City	17	(1)
1934–1935	Burnley	8	(0)
1935–1936	Crystal Palace	2	(0)
1936–1938	York City	79	(20)
1938–1939	Bradford City	0	(0)

International career
1931	Scotland Juniors	2	(0)
- * Club domestic league appearances and goals

Malcolm Comrie (28 June 1906 – 1992) was a Scottish professional footballer who played in the Football League for York City, Manchester City, Burnley and Crystal Palace as an inside forward. He was capped by Scotland at junior level.

== Personal life ==
Comrie's uncle James and relative John were also footballers.

== Career statistics ==
Appearances and goals by club, season and competition
Club	Season	League			FA Cup		Total	
Club	Season	Division	Apps	Goals	Apps	Goals	Apps	Goals
Manchester City	1932–33	First Division	14	1	0	0	14	1
Manchester City	1933–34	First Division	3	0	0	0	3	0
Manchester City	Total		17	1	0	0	17	1
Crystal Palace	1935–36	Third Division South	2	0	0	0	2	0
Career total			19	1	0	0	19	1
