= St Mirren F.C. in European football =

Scottish club in European football

St Mirren in European football
- Club: St Mirren
- First entry: 1980–81 UEFA Cup
- Latest entry: 2024–25 UEFA Conference League

Titles
- Europa League: 0 (Best: Second round)
- Cup Winners' Cup: 0 (Best: Second round)
- Conference League: 0 (Best: Third qualifying round)

St Mirren Football Club is a Scottish association football club based in Paisley. The club first competed in European competition in 1980–81, entering the UEFA Cup following a third-place finish in the Scottish Premier Division. The club reached the second round, which remains the club's joint best run in a UEFA competition.

== History ==
=== 1980–81 UEFA Cup ===
St Mirren secured a third-place finish in the Scottish Premier Division behind Aberdeen and Celtic in the 1979–80 season which qualified the club to enter the first round of the UEFA Cup the following season, along with fellow Scottish club Dundee United. Their first opponents were IF Elfsborg, of Sweden. St Mirren won the first leg 2–1 at Ryavallen, and the two clubs played out a 0–0 draw at Love Street. This was enough to send the Scottish club through to the second round. The club faced French side AS Saint-Étienne with the first leg resulting in a similar 0–0 draw in Paisley. In the away leg St Mirren were defeated 2–0 at Stade Geoffroy-Guichard to end their European début.

Season	Competition	Round	Opponent	Home	Away	Aggregate
1980–81	UEFA Cup	First round	(Sweden) IF Elfsborg	0–0	2–1	2–1
1980–81	UEFA Cup	Second round	(France) AS Saint-Étienne	0–0	0–2	0–2

=== 1983–84 UEFA Cup ===
Following their début in the UEFA Cup three seasons beforehand, St Mirren similarly qualified for the competition in 1983–84 through their league ranking. The club faced Feyenoord of the Netherlands in the first round. In the first leg they went 1–0 down at home and were defeated in a similar fashion at the Feijenoord Stadion in Rotterdam in the away leg 2–0, rounding off a 3–0 aggregate defeat.

Season	Competition	Round	Opponent	Home	Away	Aggregate
1983–84	UEFA Cup	First round	(Netherlands) Feyenoord	0–1	0–2	0–3

=== 1985–86 UEFA Cup ===
With a fifth-place finish in the Scottish Premier Division St Mirren qualified for the UEFA Cup for a third time. In the first round they were drawn against Czechoslovak team SK Slavia Prague. In the first leg at Stadion Evžena Rošického St Mirren were narrowly defeated 1–0. In the return leg in Scotland the match ended 1–0 after 90 minutes but this time in favour of St Mirren which forced the match into extra time. The home team went on to score two goals and win the match 3–0 on the night at Love Street and 3–1 on aggregate to progress to the second round. Hammarby IF of Sweden were the opponents in the second round and the two clubs played out a 3–3 draw in the first leg at Söderstadion in Stockholm. In the return leg, St Mirren were defeated 2–1 on the night and 5–4 on aggregate.

Season	Competition	Round	Opponent	Home	Away	Aggregate
1985–86	UEFA Cup	First round	(Czechoslovakia) SK Slavia Prague	3–0 (a.e.t.)	0–1	3–1
1985–86	UEFA Cup	Second round	(Sweden) Hammarby IF	1–2	3–3	4–5

=== 1987–88 European Cup Winners' Cup ===
St Mirren qualified for the Cup Winners Cup as Scottish Cup winners from the previous season. The club faced Tromsø IL of Norway in the first round. St Mirren won the first leg 1–0 at Love Street and the second leg at Alfheim Stadion ended 0–0 which was enough to send the club through. Their second round opponents were KV Mechelen from Belgium. In the first leg the match ended 0–0 in Mechelen but St Mirren was defeated 2–0 at home in the return leg and were thus eliminated. KV Mechelen went on to be surprise winners of the tournament in their European début.

Season	Competition	Round	Opponent	Home	Away	Aggregate
1987–88	UEFA Cup Winners' Cup	First round	(Norway) Tromsø IL	1–0	0–0	1–0
1987–88	UEFA Cup Winners' Cup	Second round	(Belgium) KV Mechelen	0–2	0–0	0–2

=== 2024–25 UEFA Europa Conference League ===
St Mirren qualified for the UEFA Europa Conference League with a 5th place finish in the Scottish Premiership. The club ended their 36 year European drought by starting in the Conference League Second qualifying round with a 0–0 away draw to Icelandic side, Valur, before dispatching them 4–1 in Paisley. In the Third qualifying round, St Mirren were drawn against Norwegian side, SK Brann. Despite levelling the tie in the 90th minute in Paisley, Brann won the second leg in Bergen 3–1 with two stoppage time goals.

Season	Competition	Round	Opponent	Home	Away	Aggregate
2024–25	UEFA Conference League	Second Qualifying Round	(Iceland) Valur	4–1	0–0	4–1
2024–25	UEFA Conference League	Third Qualifying Round	(Norway) SK Brann	1–1	3–1	2–4

== Overall record ==
=== By competition ===
Competition	P	W	D	L	GF	GA	GD
UEFA Cup	10	2	3	5	9	12	-3
UEFA Cup Winners' Cup	4	1	2	1	1	2	-1
UEFA Conference League	4	1	2	1	6	5	+1
Total	18	4	7	7	16	19	-3

=== By country ===
Country	Pld	W	D	L	GF	GA	GD	Win%	Ref
Belgium	2	0	1	1	0	2	−2	0.00	
Czechoslovakia	2	1	0	1	3	1	+2	50.00	
France	2	0	1	1	0	2	−2	0.00	
Iceland	2	1	1	0	4	1	+3	50.00	
Netherlands	2	0	0	2	0	3	−3	0.00	
Norway	4	1	2	1	2	4	−2	25.00	
Sweden	4	1	2	1	6	6	+0	25.00	
