= Collie Martin =

Scottish footballer

Personal information
- Full name: David Collie Martin
- Date of birth: 19 March 1890
- Place of birth: Brechin, Scotland
- Date of death: 26 March 1917 (aged 27)
- Place of death: Ypres salient, Belgium
- Position: Forward

Senior career*
| Years | Team | Apps | (Gls) |
- Brechin City
| 1911–1913 | Dundee | 8 | (3) |
| 1913–1915 | Dundee Hibernian | 47 | (48) |
- * Club domestic league appearances and goals

David Collie Martin (19 March 1890 – 26 March 1917) was a Scottish footballer who played as a forward. He started his career as a centre forward at Brechin City before moving on to Dundee in 1911. He only played a few games for Dundee before transferring to Dundee Hibernian (Dundee United's name until 1923). He made his debut for Dundee Hibs on 16 August 1913 and in his first season scored 22 goals in Scottish Division 2, becoming the division's top scorer for 1913–14.

In his next season with Dundee Hibs he was again Scottish Division 2 top scorer, this time with 30 goals, scoring 5 in one game against Albion Rovers. After starting season 1915–16 in a similar fashion, he volunteered for the Black Watch in November 1915. In total, he scored 80 goals in 92 games for Dundee Hibs in all competitions. He was fatally wounded by a shell during a German trench raid at the Ypres salient on 26 March 1917, having attained the rank of corporal by the time of his death. He is buried in Railway Dugouts Burial Ground, Belgium.
