= Bob McEwan =

Scottish footballer

Personal information
- Full name: Robert Blaikie McEwan
- Date of birth: 1881
- Place of birth: Edinburgh, Scotland
- Date of death: 1957 (aged 75–76)
- Place of death: Edinburgh, Scotland
- Position: Full back

Senior career*
Years	Team	Apps	(Gls)
1896–1901	Edinburgh Rosebery		
1901–1903	St Bernard's	27	(2)
1903–1904	Bury	35	(0)
1904–1905	Rangers	9	(0)
1905–1906	Chelsea	19	(0)
1906–1908	Glossop	55	(1)
1908–1909	Queens Park Rangers	2	(0)
1909–1910	Dundee	12	(0)
Total		159+	(3+)
- * Club domestic league appearances and goals

Robert Blaikie McEwan (1881 – 1957) was a Scottish footballer who played for clubs including St Bernard's, Bury, Rangers, Chelsea, Glossop and Dundee. He played over 100 games in the Football League and nearly 50 in the Scottish Football League and was also on the winning team in the 1910 Scottish Cup final.

== Career ==
McEwan joined Bury of the Football League First Division from Scottish club St Bernard's in 1903; he played 35 times for Bury before returning to Scotland in 1904, where he played for Rangers. A year later, he returned to England to join newly-formed Chelsea. He played in the club's first game in the Football League and was technically the first Chelsea player to score a goal in a competitive match, as he scored an own goal which gave opponents Stockport County a 1–0 win.

After a season with Queens Park Rangers in which he barely featured in the first team, he returned to Scotland in 1909 to play for Dundee. He was in the "Dee" team that won the 1910 Scottish Cup final.

== Style of play ==
In 1905, the Penny Illustrated Paper likened his style of play to that of 19th-century Scottish international Donald Gow and said he had "plenty of speed and a safe kick".

== Personal life ==
In 1906, McEwan was acclaimed a hero for saving a boy from drowning in the Firth of Forth after a boat capsized.
