= 1906–07 in Scottish football =

Football in Scotland
- Season: 1906–07

1906–07 in Scottish football

Division One champions
- Celtic

Division Two champions
- St Bernard's

Scottish Cup winners
- Celtic

Junior Cup winners
- Strathclyde

Scotland national team
- 1907 BHC

The 1906–07 season was the 34th season of competitive football in Scotland and the 17th season of the Scottish Football League.

== League competitions ==
=== Scottish League Division One ===
Pos	Team	Pld	W	D	L	GF	GA	GD	Pts	Qualification or relegation
1	Celtic (C)	34	23	9	2	80	30	+50	55	Champions
2	Dundee	34	18	12	4	53	26	+27	48	
3	Rangers	34	19	7	8	69	33	+36	45	
4	Airdrieonians	34	18	6	10	59	44	+15	42	
5	Falkirk	34	17	7	10	73	58	+15	41	
6	Third Lanark	34	15	9	10	57	48	+9	39	
7	St Mirren	34	12	13	9	50	44	+6	37	
8	Clyde	34	15	6	13	47	52	−5	36	
9	Heart of Midlothian	34	11	13	10	46	43	+3	35	
10	Motherwell	34	12	9	13	45	48	−3	33	
11	Hibernian	34	10	10	14	40	49	−9	30	
12	Aberdeen	34	10	10	14	48	55	−7	30	
13	Morton	34	11	6	17	41	50	−9	28	
14	Partick Thistle	34	9	8	17	40	60	−20	26	
15	Queen's Park	34	9	6	19	51	66	−15	24	
16	Port Glasgow Athletic	34	7	7	20	30	67	−37	21	
17	Kilmarnock	34	8	5	21	40	72	−32	21	
18	Hamilton Academical	34	8	5	21	40	64	−24	21	

(C) Champions

Champions: Celtic

=== Scottish League Division Two ===
Pos	Team	Pld	W	D	L	GF	GA	GD	Pts
1	St Bernard's (C)	22	14	4	4	41	24	+17	32
2	Arthurlie	22	12	3	7	51	40	+11	27
2	Vale of Leven	22	13	1	8	54	35	+19	27
4	Dumbarton	22	11	3	8	52	35	+17	25
5	Leith Athletic	22	10	4	8	40	35	+5	24
6	Albion Rovers	22	10	3	9	43	36	+7	23
6	Cowdenbeath	22	10	5	7	36	40	−4	23 (Note: Cowdenbeath were docked two points for fielding an ineligible player.)
8	Ayr	22	7	6	9	34	38	−4	20
9	Abercorn	22	5	7	10	29	47	−18	17
10	Raith Rovers	22	6	4	12	40	48	−8	16 (Note: Raith Rovers and East Stirlingshire finished level on points but Raith Rovers won a play-off match to determine ranking positions.)
11	East Stirlingshire	22	6	4	12	36	48	−12	16
12	Ayr Parkhouse	22	5	2	15	33	63	−30	12

Source: statto.com
Rules for classification: Teams finish equal if level on points. Points system: 2 points for a win, 1 point for a draw, 0 points for a loss
(C) Champions
Notes:

Note: Cowdenbeath were docked two points for fielding an ineligible player.

== Other honours ==
=== Cup honours ===
==== National ====
Competition	Winner	Score	Runner-up
Scottish Cup	Celtic	3 – 0	Hearts
Scottish Qualifying Cup	Raith Rovers	3 – 1	St Bernard's
Scottish Junior Cup	Strathclyde	1 – 0	Maryhill

==== County ====
Competition	Winner	Score	Runner-up
Aberdeenshire Cup	Aberdeen	3 – 1	Aberdeen Harp
Ayrshire Cup	Hurlford	3 – 1	Lanemark
Border Cup	Berwick Rangers	3 – 0	Vale of Leithen
Dumbartonshire Cup	Vale of Leven	2 – 0 (Note: Second replay needed.)	Dumbarton
East of Scotland Shield	Hearts	1 – 0	Leith Athletic
Fife Cup	Kirkcaldy United	3 – 1	Cowdenbeath
Forfarshire Cup	Arbroath	1 – 0	Dundee
Glasgow Cup	Celtic	3 – 2	Third Lanark
Lanarkshire Cup	Motherwell	1 – 0	Airdrie
Linlithgowshire Cup	Bo'ness	2 – 1 (Note: Replay needed.)	Broxburn
North of Scotland Cup	Clachnacuddin	3 – 2	Inverness Citadel
Perthshire Cup	St Johnstone	1 – 0 (Note: Third replay needed.)	Vale of Teith
Renfrewshire Cup	Morton	4 – 1 (Note: Aggregate over two legs.)	Johnstone
Southern Counties Cup	Nithsdale Wanderers	1 – 0	Douglas Wanderers
Stirlingshire Cup	East Stirlingshire	2 – 0	Alloa Athletic

=== Non-league honours ===
Highland League

Top Three
Pos	Team	Pld	W	D	L	GF	GA	GD	Pts
1	Inverness Thistle	10	8	1	1	31	13	+18	17
2	Inverness Caledonian	9	3	5	1	18	15	+3	11
3	Inverness Citadel	10	3	4	3	18	17	+1	10

Source: SFHA

Other Senior Leagues

Division	Winner
Border Senior League	unfinished
Eastern League	unfinished
Northern League	Kirkcaldy United / Dundee 'A'
Perthshire League	Stanley
Scottish Combination	Galston / Johnstone
Scottish Union	Rangers 'A'

== Scotland national team ==
Date	Venue	Opponents	Score (Note: Scotland's score is shown first.)	Competition	Scotland scorer(s)
4 March 1907	Racecourse Ground, Wrexham (A)	Wales	0–1	BHC	
17 March 1907	Celtic Park, Glasgow (H)	Ireland	3–0	BHC	Frank O'Rourke, Bobby Walker, Charles Thomson (pen.)
6 April 1907	St James' Park, Newcastle (A)	England	1–1	BHC	Bob Crompton (o.g.)

Key:

- (H) = Home match
- (A) = Away match
- BHC = British Home Championship

Team	Pld	W	D	L	GF	GA	GD	Pts
Wales (C)	3	2	1	0	5	3	+2	5
England	3	1	2	0	3	2	+1	4
Scotland	3	1	1	1	4	2	+2	3
Ireland	3	0	0	3	2	7	−5	0

Rules for classification: 1) points. The points system worked as follows: 2 points for a win and 1 point for a draw.
(C) Champions

== Other national teams ==
=== Scottish League XI ===
Date	Venue	Opponents	Score (Note: Scottish League XI's score is shown first.)	Scotland scorer(s)
2 March 1907	Ibrox Park, Glasgow (H)	(England) Football League XI	0–0	

== See also ==
- 1906–07 Aberdeen F.C. season
- 1906–07 Rangers F.C. season
