= George Chaplin =

Scottish footballer

Personal information
- Full name: George Duncan Chaplin
- Date of birth: 26 September 1888
- Place of birth: Dundee, Scotland
- Date of death: 14 May 1963 (aged 74)
- Position: Full-back

Senior career*
Years	Team	Apps	(Gls)
- Dundee Arnot
1905–1908	Dundee	38	(0)
1908–1919	Bradford City	88	(0)
1919–1923	Coventry City	106	(0)
Total		232	(0)

International career
1908	Scotland	1	(0)
- * Club domestic league appearances and goals

George Duncan Chaplin (26 September 1888 – 14 May 1963) was a Scottish footballer who played as a full-back. He played professionally for various clubs in Scotland and England, and also made one senior international appearance for Scotland.

== Career ==
Born in Dundee, Chaplin played for Dundee, Bradford City and Coventry City. For Bradford City, he made 88 appearances in the Football League; he also made nine FA Cup appearances. He missed two seasons through tuberculosis, but made a full recovery to spend a decade with Bradford. His career was brought to an end in 1923 (although he was already 34 by that stage) when he was implicated in a match fixing scandal from three years earlier when it was found Bury had accepted payments from Coventry to prevent the latter's relegation, and Chaplin was banned for life along with several others.

His single international appearance came for Scotland against Wales on 7 March 1908, when Chaplin was only 19 years old. His performance was criticised in a match report which claimed: "Chaplin fell short of requirements at left back."

== Personal life ==
His brothers were fellow professional players Jack Chaplin and Alex Chaplin.

== See also ==
- List of Scottish football families
- Match fixing in English football
