= 1909–10 in Scottish football =

Football in Scotland
- Season: 1909–10

1909–10 in Scottish football

Division One champions
- Celtic

Division Two champions
- Leith Athletic

Scottish Cup winners
- Dundee

Junior Cup winners
- Ashfield

Scotland national team
- 1910 BHC

The 1909–10 season was the 37th season of competitive football in Scotland and the 20th season of the Scottish Football League.

== Overview ==
Celtic extended their record run of consecutive league titles to six, while Dundee were Scottish Cup winners for the first time. On the international front, Scotland were outright British champions for the first time in eight years.

== League competitions ==
=== Scottish League Division One ===
Pos	Team	Pld	W	D	L	GF	GA	GD	Pts	Relegation
1	Celtic (C)	34	24	6	4	63	22	+41	54	Champions
2	Falkirk	34	22	8	4	71	28	+43	52	
3	Rangers	34	20	6	8	70	35	+35	46	
4	Aberdeen	34	16	8	10	44	29	+15	40	
5	Clyde	34	14	9	11	47	40	+7	37	
6	Dundee	34	14	8	12	52	44	+8	36	
7	Third Lanark	34	13	8	13	62	44	+18	34	
8	Hibernian	34	14	6	14	33	40	−7	34	
9	Airdrieonians	34	12	9	13	46	57	−11	33	
10	Motherwell	34	12	8	14	59	60	−1	32	
11	Kilmarnock	34	12	8	14	53	59	−6	32	
12	Heart of Midlothian	34	12	7	15	59	50	+9	31	
13	St Mirren	34	13	5	16	48	58	−10	31	
14	Queen's Park	34	12	6	16	54	74	−20	30	
15	Hamilton Academical	34	11	6	17	50	67	−17	28	
16	Partick Thistle	34	8	10	16	45	59	−14	26	
17	Morton	34	11	3	20	38	60	−22	25	
18	Port Glasgow Athletic (R)	34	3	5	26	25	93	−68	11	Relegated to the 1910–11 Scottish Division Two

(C) Champions; (R) Relegated

Champions: Celtic

=== Scottish League Division Two ===
Pos	Team	Pld	W	D	L	GF	GA	GD	Pts	Promotion or relegation
1	Leith Athletic (C)	22	13	7	2	44	19	+25	33 (Note: Leith Athletic and Raith Rovers finished level on points but did not contest a play-off match for the championship so were declared joint winners.)	
1	Raith Rovers (C, P)	22	14	5	3	36	21	+15	33	Promoted to the 1910–11 Scottish Division One
3	St Bernard's	22	12	3	7	43	31	+12	27	
4	Dumbarton	22	9	5	8	44	38	+6	23	
5	Abercorn	22	7	8	7	38	40	−2	22	
6	Ayr	22	9	3	10	37	40	−3	21	
6	Vale of Leven	22	8	5	9	36	38	−2	21	
8	East Stirlingshire	22	9	2	11	38	43	−5	20	
9	Albion Rovers	22	7	5	10	34	39	−5	19	
10	Arthurlie	22	6	5	11	34	47	−13	17	
10	Cowdenbeath	22	7	3	12	22	34	−12	17	
12	Ayr Parkhouse	22	4	3	15	27	43	−16	11	Merged with Ayr

Source: statto.com
Rules for classification: Teams finish equal if level on points. Points system: 2 points for a win, 1 point for a draw, 0 points for a loss
(C) Champions; (P) Promoted

== Other honours ==
=== Cup honours ===
==== National ====
Competition	Winner	Score	Runner-up
Scottish Cup	Dundee	2 – 1 (Note: Second replay needed.)	Clyde
Scottish Qualifying Cup	Leith Athletic	4 – 0	Bathgate
Scottish Consolation Cup	Arthurlie	4 – 2	St Johnstone
Scottish Junior Cup	Ashfield	3 – 0 (Note: Replay ordered. First match null and void.)	Kilwinning Rangers
Scottish Amateur Cup	John Neilson Institute Former Pupils	6 – 1	Paisley Academical

==== County ====
Competition	Winner	Score	Runner-up
Aberdeenshire Cup	Aberdeen	2 – 1 (Note: Replay needed.)	Peterhead
Ayrshire Cup	Ayr	1 – 0	Ayr Parkhouse
Dumbartonshire Cup	Dumbarton Harp	2 – 1	Dumbarton
East of Scotland Shield	Hearts	1 – 1 (Note: Won on corners.)	St Bernard's
Fife Cup	Cowdenbeath	2 – 1	Lochgelly United
Forfarshire Cup	Brechin City	4 – 1	Arbroath
Glasgow Cup	Celtic	1 – 0	Rangers
Lanarkshire Cup	Hamilton Academical / Wishaw Thistle (Note: Trophy shared after two draws.)		
Linlithgowshire Cup	Bo'ness	1 – 0	Broxburn
Perthshire Cup	Dunblane	2 – 1	Morrisonians
Renfrewshire Cup	St Mirren	3 – 1 (Note: Aggregate over two legs.)	Abercorn
Southern Counties Cup	Dumfries	1 – 0	Nithsdale Wanderers
Stirlingshire Cup	Falkirk	10 – 0	Alloa

=== Non-league honours ===
Highland League

Top Three
Pos	Team	Pld	W	D	L	GF	GA	GD	Pts
1	Elgin City (Note: Finished first after play off.)	14	9	2	3	41	20	+21	20
2	Inverness Thistle	14	9	2	3	38	23	+15	20
3	Inverness Citadel	14	9	1	4	35	19	+16	19

Source: RSSSF

Other Senior Leagues

Division	Winner
Banffshire League	Portsoy Thistle
Border Senior League	Selkirk
Central League	Bo'ness
Midland League	Clackmannan
Northern League	Dundee 'A'
Perthshire League	Huntingtower
Scottish Combination	Nithsdale Wanderers / Girvan Athletic
Scottish Union	Dumbarton Harp

=== Other senior honours ===
- Carrie Cup: Dundee Hibernian
- North Eastern Cup: Heart of Midlothian
- Wemyss Cup: Dunfermline Athletic

== Scotland national team ==
Scotland were winners of the 1910 British Home Championship.

Date	Venue	Opponents	Score	Competition	Scotland scorer(s)
5 March 1910	Rugby Park, Kilmarnock (H)	Wales	1–0	BHC	Archie Devine
19 March 1910	Windsor Park, Belfast (A)	Ireland	0–1	BHC	
2 April 1910	Hampden Park, Glasgow (H)	England	2–0	BHC	Jimmy McMenemy, Jimmy Quinn

Key:

- (H) = Home match
- (A) = Away match
- BHC = British Home Championship

Team	Pld	W	D	L	GF	GA	GD	Pts
Scotland (C)	3	2	0	1	3	1	+2	4
England	3	1	1	1	2	3	−1	3
Ireland	3	1	1	1	3	5	−2	3
Wales	3	1	0	2	4	3	+1	2

Rules for classification: 1) points. The points system worked as follows: 2 points for a win and 1 point for a draw.
(C) Champions

== Other national teams ==
=== Scottish League XI ===
Date	Venue	Opponents	Score (Note: Scottish League XI's score is shown first.)	Scotland scorer(s)
25 October 1909	Firhill, Glasgow (H)	(Northern Ireland) Irish League XI	2–0	Jimmy Quinn, Sandy MacFarlane
26 February 1910	Ewood Park, Blackburn (A)	(England) Football League XI	3–2	Jimmy Quinn (2), Bobby Templeton

== See also ==
- 1909–10 Aberdeen F.C. season
