= Bert Dainty =

English footballer (1879–1957)

Personal information
- Full name: Herbert Charles Dainty
- Date of birth: 6 February 1879
- Place of birth: Geddington, England
- Date of death: 10 September 1957 (aged 78)
- Place of death: Dundee, Scotland
- Height: 5 ft 8 in (1.73 m)
- Position: Centre half

Senior career*
Years	Team	Apps	(Gls)
- Kettering
1899–1900	Leicester Fosse	30	(3)
1900–1901	New Brighton Tower	33	(3)
1901–1902	Leicester Fosse	23	(0)
1902–1903	Northampton Town		
1903–1904	Notts County	20	(0)
1904–1905	Southampton	31	(1)
1905–1911	Dundee	187	(24)
1911–1913	Bradford Park Avenue	63	(1)
1913–1915	Ayr United	60	(0)
1915–1918	Dundee Hibernian		

International career
1910	Scottish Football League XI	1	(0)

Managerial career
- 1914–1915: Ayr United
- 1915–1917: Dundee Hibernian
- 1931–1932: Kettering Town
- * Club domestic league appearances and goals

Herbert Charles Dainty (6 February 1879 – 10 September 1957) was an English footballer and manager. He was a restless player, who rarely stayed with one club for more than a year, but "served all his clubs with distinction".

== Playing career ==
Dainty was born in Geddington, Northamptonshire and started his playing career with local club Kettering.

=== A different club each year ===
He joined Football League Second Division team, Leicester Fosse in August 1899 and in the summer of 1900, he moved to fellow Second Division team, New Brighton Tower. At the end of the 1900–01 season, despite finishing in a creditable fourth place, New Brighton Tower folded and Dainty returned to Leicester Fosse.. In his second spell at Leicester, one of his teammates was Charles Webb who was later to play with him at Southampton (1904–1905) and Dundee (1905–1908).

He moved on again at the end of the season joining Southern League Northampton Town. His transient lifestyle continued when he joined Notts County at the end of the 1902–03 season to play for the first time in the First Division of the Football League.

=== Southampton ===
In May 1904, Dainty decided to move south to join Southern League champions Southampton.

According to Holley & Chalk's The Alphabet of the Saints, Dainty was "a worthy successor to previous Saints' centre-halves, Bowman and Chadwick. Bert was coolness personified and was at his best during desperate pressure around the goal area." He played alongside Saints' stalwarts, Samuel Meston and Bert Lee as Saints failed to repeat their previous season's performance, finishing in third place. At the end of the season Dainty decided to move on again, which "provoked an outcry in the town".

=== Dundee ===
He moved this time to Scotland where he joined Dundee in May 1905. He stayed at the club for six seasons, and was one of four Englishmen who helped Dundee to win the Scottish Cup in 1910.

== Managerial career ==
A two-year spell at Bradford Park Avenue followed before moving back to Scotland in October 1913 to join Ayr United, where he served as player/manager. In April 1915, Dainty moved to Dundee Hibernian (later to become Dundee United) and similarly became player/manager shortly afterwards, becoming the club's second ever manager. Dainty relinquished managerial duties in 1917 and retired from playing the following year, staying at the club as secretary and then briefly in 1922 as chairman.

During World War I, Dainty stayed on Tayside, where he formed his own side known as "Dainty's XI" which played regular matches for charity against other Tayside teams.

== Later career ==
After leaving Dundee Hibernian, Dainty travelled to South America as a coach, before returning to England as a coach with Ipswich Town from 1932 to 1934. He subsequently settled in the north west of England.

Herbert Dainty died on September 10, 1957.

== Family ==
His grandson was Albert Dainty (1923–1979), who played for Preston North End, Stockport County, Southport and Morecambe, and went on to become Morecambe's manager for the 1955–56 season. He also made guest appearances during the war for Manchester United, Leeds United and Millwall.

== Honours ==
Dundee

- Scottish Cup: winner 1910
- Scottish Football League runners-up: 1906–07 and 1908–09
