= 1913–14 Scottish Division Two =

Scottish Division Two
- Season: 1913–14
- Champions: Cowdenbeath
- Promoted: n/a

The 1913–14 Scottish Division Two was won by Cowdenbeath, with Johnstone finishing bottom.

== Table ==
Pos	Team	Pld	W	D	L	GF	GA	GD	Pts
1	Cowdenbeath (C)	22	13	5	4	34	17	+17	31
2	Albion Rovers	22	10	7	5	38	33	+5	27
3	Dundee Hibernian	22	11	4	7	36	31	+5	26
3	Dunfermline Athletic	22	11	4	7	46	28	+18	26
5	Abercorn	22	10	3	9	32	32	0	23
5	St Johnstone	22	9	5	8	48	38	+10	23
7	East Stirlingshire	22	7	8	7	40	36	+4	22
7	St Bernard's	22	8	6	8	39	31	+8	22
9	Arthurlie	22	8	4	10	35	38	−3	20
10	Leith Athletic	22	5	9	8	31	37	−6	19
11	Vale of Leven	22	5	3	14	23	47	−24	13
12	Johnstone	22	4	4	14	21	55	−34	12

Source: statto.com
Rules for classification: Teams finish equal if level on points. Points system: 2 points for a win, 1 point for a draw, 0 points for a loss
(C) Champions
