= Jack Chaplin =

Scottish footballer and manager

Personal information
- Full name: Jonathan Fowler Chaplin
- Date of birth: 10 October 1882
- Place of birth: Dundee, Scotland
- Date of death: 15 April 1952 (aged 69)
- Place of death: Doncaster, England
- Position: Left back

Senior career*
Years	Team	Apps	(Gls)
1901–1902	Dundee Arnot		
1902–1903	Dundee Wanderers		
1903–1905	Dundee	27	(0)
1905–1908	Tottenham Hotspur	66	(0)
1908–1910	Dundee	61	(0)
1910–1911	Manchester City	15	(0)

International career
1909	Scottish Football League XI	1	(0)

Managerial career
- 1926–1929: Huddersfield Town
- * Club domestic league appearances and goals

Jonathan Fowler Chaplin (10 October 1882 – 15 April 1952) was a Scottish football player and manager. A left back, Chaplin played for Dundee over two spells, winning the Scottish Cup in 1910, and represented the Scottish League. He also played for Tottenham Hotspur and Manchester City in England.

== Career ==
Chaplin signed for Tottenham Hotspur in May 1905 and didn't make his debut till November which occurred in the Western League against Plymouth Argyle. He went on to make a total of 102 appearances for the club.

He later managed Huddersfield Town after serving as trainer under Herbert Chapman (formerly his teammate at Tottenham and boss at Leeds City), leading the club to runners-up finishes in the Football League in 1926–27 and 1927–28, and to the 1928 FA Cup Final which they lost to Blackburn Rovers.

His brothers were fellow professional players George Chaplin and Alex Chaplin.

== Bibliography ==
- Goodwin, Bob (1992). The Spurs Alphabet. ACL & Polar Publishing (UK) Ltd. ISBN 0-9514862-8-4.
- Ian Thomas; Owen Thomas; Alan Hodgson; John Ward (2007). 99 Years and Counting: Stats and Stories. Huddersfield Town A.F.C. ISBN 978-0955728105.
