= Bob Crumley =

Scottish footballer

Personal information
- Full name: Robert Walker Crumley
- Birth name: Robert Walker Brymer
- Date of birth: 20 May 1876
- Place of birth: Lochee, Scotland
- Date of death: 27 January 1949 (aged 72)
- Place of death: Dundee, Scotland
- Position: Goalkeeper

Senior career*
Years	Team	Apps	(Gls)
1899–1902	Dundee Victoria		
1902–1903	Lochee United		
1903–1907	Newcastle United	4	(0)
1907–1911	Dundee	131	(0)
1911–1912	Darlington		
1912–1913	Dundee	0	(0)
1913–1914	Arbroath	30	(0)
- * Club domestic league appearances and goals

Robert Walker Crumley (20 May 1876 – 27 January 1949) was a Scottish professional footballer who made over 130 appearances in the Scottish League for Dundee as a goalkeeper.

== Personal life ==
Crumley's younger brother James was also a goalkeeper. After service with the Gordon Highlanders during the Second Boer War, Crumley served as a sergeant in the Black Watch during the First World War and saw action on the Western Front and at Salonika. He ended the war in the Labour Corps. Crumley received a war pension for malaria and rheumatism.

== Career statistics ==
Appearances and goals by club, season and competition
Club	Season	League			National cup (Note: Includes Scottish Cup, FA Cup)		Total	
Club	Season	Division	Apps	Goals	Apps	Goals	Apps	Goals
Newcastle United	1904–05	First Division	1	0	0	0	1	0
Newcastle United	1905–06	First Division	3	0	0	0	3	0
Newcastle United	Total		4	0	0	0	4	0
Dundee	1906–07	Scottish First Division	2	0	0	0	2	0
Dundee	1907–08	Scottish First Division	34	0	4	0	38	0
Dundee	1908–09	Scottish First Division	33	0	3	0	36	0
Dundee	1909–10	Scottish First Division	31	0	10	0	41	0
Dundee	1910–11	Scottish First Division	31	0	4	0	35	0
Dundee	Total		131	0	21	0	152	0
Career total			135	0	21	0	156	0

== Honours ==
Dundee

- Scottish Cup: 1909–10
