= Jimmy Lawson (Scottish footballer) =

Scottish footballer and golfer

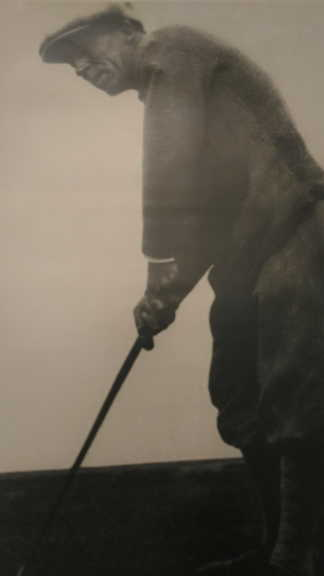
- Lawson in action as a golfer, 1930s

Personal information
- Full name: James Samson Lawson
- Date of birth: 26 March 1886
- Place of birth: Panbride, Scotland
- Date of death: 2 September 1962 (aged 76)
- Place of death: Nassau, Bahamas
- Height: 5 ft 8 in (1.73 m)
- Position: Right back

Senior career*
Years	Team	Apps	(Gls)
1906–1908	Neilston Victoria		
1908–1913	Dundee	121	(0)
1913–1914	Airdrieonians	17	(0)
1914–1915	New Bedford Whalers		
1915	Bethlehem Steel		
Total		138	(0)

International career
1912	Scottish League XI	1	(0)
- * Club domestic league appearances and goals

James Samson Lawson (26 March 1886 – 2 September 1962) was a Scottish footballer who played as a right back, primarily for Dundee, before moving to the United States to be a professional golfer.

== Career ==
He was part of the Dundee squad which won the Scottish Cup in 1910 and was selected to play for the Scottish Football League XI in 1912. After a one-year spell at Airdrieonians he quit the game in 1914 and moved to the United States to become a professional golfer, also remaining involved in football as a player with New Bedford Whalers and Bethlehem Steel, and as a coach for the Steel and at Lehigh University.

Over a long career he was a golf club manufacturer, and a country club pro in Chicago, Flint, Texas and Indianapolis, before retiring to Florida. He also served in the Canadian Expeditionary Force in World War I and in the U.S. Army in World War II.

== Personal life ==
Jimmy Lawson was born to George, a farmer who also worked as a gardener and draper, and Elizabeth "Betsy" (née Will), a domestic worker. Two of his brothers, Fred Reid Lawson (1888–1954) and Herbert Charles "Heb" Lawson (1892–1930) also moved to America to play golf professionally. Herbert also briefly played football at Bethlehem Steel.
