= John Hunter (footballer, born 1878) =

Scottish footballer and manager (1878–1966)

Personal information
- Full name: John Bryson Hunter
- Date of birth: 6 April 1878
- Place of birth: Johnstone, Scotland
- Date of death: 12 January 1966 (aged 87)
- Place of death: Motherwell, Scotland
- Position: Centre forward

Youth career
- Westmarch XI

Senior career*
Years	Team	Apps	(Gls)
1897–1899	Abercorn	20	(14)
1899–1902	Liverpool	37	(10)
1902–1904	Heart of Midlothian	43	(14)
1904–1905	Woolwich Arsenal	22	(4)
1905–1907	Portsmouth	37	(11)
1907–1910	Dundee	61	(46)
1910–1911	Clyde	17	(4)
Total		237	(103)

International career
1909	Scotland	1	(0)

Managerial career
- 1911–1946: Motherwell
- * Club domestic league appearances and goals

John Bryson Hunter (6 April 1878 – 12 January 1966), also known as "Sailor" Hunter, was a Scottish football player and manager. He is most notable as Motherwell's first and longest-serving manager, who guided the team to their only Scottish league title in the 1931–32 season.

== Playing career ==
Hunter was born in Johnstone, Renfrewshire, and at the age of 18 he signed for Abercorn, who had been relegated to Division Two the previous season. While Abercorn did not improve any during his time there – in his final season they finished bottom of the Second Division and thus bottom of the League, Hunter was duly signed by Liverpool. He was part of the Liverpool side that won their first ever English league championship in 1900–01. A year later he moved back to Scotland, signing for Hearts for £300 in a joint transfer with Tom Robertson. He was part of the Hearts side that lost the 1903 Scottish Cup final to Rangers.

In 1904 he joined Woolwich Arsenal in a £165 transfer, playing 22 times for them in 1904–05 before joining Portsmouth of the Southern League. It was when he joined Dundee in 1907, that he became a prolific goalscorer and earned his only cap for Scotland in a 3–2 defeat by Wales at Wrexham. In the 1910 Scottish Cup final Dundee were up against a strong Clyde team who had knocked out the champions Celtic 3–1 in the semi-final, and were 2–0 up in the final with six minutes to play, when Hunter scored a goal to give Dundee hope. Two minutes later Dundee equalised. The first replay ended in a 0–0 draw but Dundee won the second replay 2–1, with Hunter scoring the winning goal. He signed for Clyde in September 1910, but injury forced him to retire six months later.

== Managerial career ==
Two months later, in April 1911, Hunter was appointed secretary-manager at Motherwell at the age of 32. Motherwell had finished second bottom of Division One in the previous season, just above relegated Queens Park. Hunter would improve their position slightly in the following season, and the reserve side had won their League title. Motherwell improved steadily, although the First World War interrupted this progress. In 1916–17 Hunter gave a debut to young centre-forward Hughie Ferguson, who scored and followed it up with a hat-trick a week later against Dundee. Ferguson was Motherwell's top scorer in every season he played at Fir Park, and to this day he remains Motherwell's all-time top scorer. For the next four seasons Motherwell never finished lower than fifth in the league, but over time financial restraints began to tell on the club; local unemployment was higher than it had ever been and crowds were down, and the club had to abandon their reserve team. Motherwell began to slip in the league and they finished the 1924–25 third from bottom, on the same points total as the two teams immediately below them: only Ferguson's goals that kept them up. The following season started off pretty well for Motherwell but in October Hughie Ferguson was sold to Cardiff City.

Hunter had a replacement for Ferguson in Willie MacFadyen, who would more than justify the managers faith in him. Motherwell finished fifth that season and for the next eight seasons they would not finish lower than third, with a League title in 1931–32. Hunter would remain as manager at Fir Park until 1946 when George Stevenson, inside left and playmaker of the team which won the Championship would take over. Sailor found it hard to leave Fir Park and remained as club secretary until his retirement in 1959 at the age of 80. The club granted him a weekly pension upon his retirement. He died in January 1966.

On 9 November 2016, Motherwell FC renamed the East Stand at Fir Park the 'John Hunter Stand' with the club saying at the time:

We currently honour and remember a number of our legends from yesteryear with the Joe Wark Lounge, the Phil O'Donnell & Davie Cooper Stands and the Martis, Weir, Humphrey and Paton Boxes in the South Stand.

In future years, we want young fans to ask who John Hunter was so his incomparable half-century contribution to Motherwell FC and his amazing story can be kept alive and well for every generation.

On 4 November 2020, it was announced that Hunter was to be inducted into the Motherwell F.C. Hall of Fame.

== Managerial statistics ==
Team	Nation	From	To	Record							
Team	Nation	From	To	G	W	D	L	F	A	GD	Win %
Motherwell	Scotland	June 1911	June 1946	1,245	611	259	375	2,513	1,801	+712	49.08
Total				1,245	611	259	375	2,513	1,801	+712	49.08

As of 25 June 2023

== Honours ==
=== As a player ===
- Scottish Cup: 1910; Runner-up 1903

=== As a manager ===
- Scottish First Division (Level 1): 1932
- Scottish Cup: Runner-up 1931, 1933, 1939
