= Jim Bellamy =

English footballer and manager

Personal information
- Full name: James Francis Bellamy
- Date of birth: 11 September 1881
- Place of birth: Bethnal Green, England
- Date of death: 30 March 1969 (aged 87)
- Place of death: Chadwell Heath
- Positions: Right half; outside right

Senior career*
Years	Team	Apps	(Gls)
- Barking
- Grays United
	Reading	3	(2)
1903–1907	Woolwich Arsenal	29	(4)
1907–1908	Portsmouth	6	(3)
1908	Norwich City	17	(5)
1908–1912	Dundee	118	(44)
1912	Motherwell	8	(1)
1912–1914	Burnley	17	(3)
1914	Fulham	17	(1)
1917–1918	Dundee Hibernian		
	Southend United	6	(0)
- Ebbw Vale
- Barking Town

Managerial career
- 1926–1928: Brescia
- 1929–1931: Barcelona
- * Club domestic league appearances and goals

James Francis Bellamy (11 September 1881 – 30 March 1969) was an English football player and manager who played as right half or outside right for a number of clubs in the Football League, including Woolwich Arsenal, Burnley and Fulham. He also played in Scotland, winning the Scottish Cup with Dundee in 1910.

Bellamy went on to coach in various European countries, such as Germany, Italy with Brescia Calcio, and Spain with FC Barcelona.

== Early life ==
Bellamy was born in Bethnal Green, Middlesex, on 11 September 1881.

== Playing career ==
Bellamy began his career in non-League football with Barking, Grays United and Reading. He then joined Woolwich Arsenal in May 1903, making his first team debut in 1905. Altogether he made a sum of twenty nine league appearances for the Gunners, scoring four times in all. He was transferred to Portsmouth in 1907, and also played for Norwich City before joining Dundee in May 1908. He was part of the Dundee team that won the 1910 Scottish Cup Final against Clyde. After a goalless draw, Bellamy scored Dundee's first goal as they won the replay 2–1.

Bellamy left Dundee in May 1912, when he was transferred to Motherwell. He returned to England shortly afterwards, joining Burnley in October 1912. He then signed for Fulham in July 1914.

Bellamy later played for Dundee Hibernian during the 1917–18 season, and also played for Southend United and Ebbw Vale before ending his career at Barking Town. (Note: Bellamy's former club Barking had changed their name to Barking Town in 1919.)

== Management career ==
After retiring as a player, Bellamy began a coaching career in Europe. He had jobs in Germany and managed Brescia in the Italian Football Championship from 1926 to 1928 before going to Spain.

On 26 March 1929, Bellamy was appointed as the manager of Barcelona, succeeding Romà Forns. At the time he took up the position, Barcelona were placed eighth at five points off the top. Bellamy eventually took the club to their first ever La Liga title as they finished three points ahead of second placed Real Madrid. Bellamy's stay at Camp de Les Corts saw him lift a Catalan football championship title in 1929–30. During the 1930–31 season he led Barça to another Catalan championship, but was at the helm for the club's 12–1 record defeat to Athletic Bilbao in February 1931.

Returning to England, Bellamy was appointed coach of Barking Town in February 1933, but was dismissed three months later. He later claimed for wrongful dismissal, but lost in court.

== After football ==
Bellamy died at Chadwell Heath, London, on 30 March 1969.

== Honours ==
=== As a player ===
Dundee

- Scottish Cup: 1910
- Forfarshire Cup: 1909 & 1912

=== As manager ===
Barcelona

- La Liga: 1929
- Campionat de Catalunya: 1929–30, 1930–31
