= John Fraser (footballer, born 1876) =

Scottish footballer (1876-1952)

Personal information
- Date of birth: 10 November 1876
- Place of birth: Dumbarton, Scotland
- Date of death: 1 October 1952 (aged 75)
- Place of death: Stoke Newington, London, England
- Height: 5 ft 11 in (1.80 m)
- Position: Outside left

Senior career*
| Years | Team | Apps | (Gls) |
| 1896–1897 | Dumbarton | 10 | (3) |
| 1897–1898 | Motherwell | 9 | (2) |
| 1898–1899 | Notts County | 41 | (5) |
| 1899–1901 | Newcastle United | 49 | (9) |
| 1901–1902 | St Mirren | 18 | (6) |
| 1902–1905 | Southampton | 73 | (25) |
| 1905–1912 | Dundee | 188 | (26) |
| Total | | 388 | (76) |

International career
| 1902 | Scottish Football League XI | 1 | (0) |
| 1907 | Scotland | 1 | (0) |
- * Club domestic league appearances and goals

John Fraser (10 November 1876 – 1 October 1952) was a Scottish professional footballer who played as an outside left. He was part of the Dundee team who won the Scottish Cup in 1910, having earlier played for Dumbarton, Motherwell, Notts County, Newcastle United, St Mirren and Southampton. He also represented both Scotland and the Scottish Football League XI. In addition, while with Dumbarton he earned a representative cap for Dumbartonshire against Glasgow in 1897, and played for both sides in the Home Scots v Anglo-Scots trial matches. He later went on to coach Dundee and Chelsea.

== Career ==
Jack Fraser started his football career at the late age of 18 with his local club Dumbarton, where he appeared as part of the team that lost the Scottish Cup final 5–1 to Rangers in 1897. After then spending one season with Motherwell he decided to try his luck in England and joined First Division club Notts County in January 1898. He remained at County for eighteen months before moving on to Newcastle United where he remained for two seasons, until returning to Scotland with St Mirren for the 1901–02 season. Fraser represented the Scottish Football League XI in 1902.

By the time he joined Southampton in May 1902 he had clocked up eight years with five different clubs with no conspicuous success. He was signed by Southampton as a replacement for Edgar Chadwick who had moved on to Liverpool after leading the Saints to the 1902 FA Cup final. In an effort to reclaim the Southern League title, Southampton recruited six new players, including fellow Scots, Tom Robertson from Liverpool and Mark Bell from Heart of Midlothian.

Fraser scored a hat-trick on his debut against Brentford on 6 September 1902 (with the other goals from fellow débutante Tom Barlow (2) and Harry Wood) and soon became a fixture in the side and missed only a handful of games in the 1902–03 season, including twice giving way to C. B. Fry for his final appearances for the club. On 13 December 1902 he scored four goals as Saints recorded their joint highest victory margin of 11–0 against Watford.

When he joined the Saints he originally played at centre-forward, but he soon switched to inside-left where he had his best games and soon became a crowd favourite. Described in Holley & Chalk's "The Alphabet of the Saints" as "a bulky man" he "found the wing positions more to his liking and presented an awesome sight to defending goalkeepers when cutting inside and bearing down on them in full flight". Saints finished Fraser's first season by taking the Southern League championship for the fifth time in seven years with Fraser contributing 15 goals.

This success was repeated in the following season, although in February 1903 he lost his place through injury to Fred Mouncher. He was restored to the starting line-up for the 1904–05 season where he continued to dovetail well on the left with George Hedley, but Saints finished the season in a disappointing third place.

Fraser had planned on remaining in Southampton as his intention was to purchase a tobacconist's business in the town, but the deal fell through and he then accepted excellent terms from Dundee and returned to Scotland.

The return to Scotland paid dividends as he was to gain an international cap for Scotland on 16 March 1907 in a 1–0 victory over Ireland. He went on to win the Scottish Cup in 1910, defeating Clyde 2–1 in a second replay.

Fraser moved back to England in 1919 to work for Chelsea, firstly as a scout. He was later an assistant manager under David Calderhead and Leslie Knighton.

== Honours ==
Dumbarton

- Scottish Cup: finalist 1897

Southampton

- Southern League championship: 1902–03; 1903–04

Dundee

- Scottish Cup: winner 1910
