= Bert Lee (footballer) =

English footballer

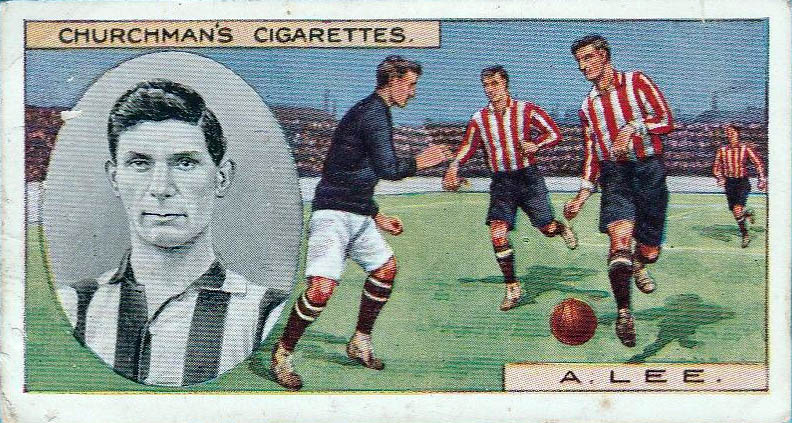

Personal information
- Full name: Ernest Albert Lee
- Date of birth: 19 August 1879
- Place of birth: Bridport, England
- Date of death: 14 January 1958 (aged 78)
- Place of death: Southampton, England
- Height: 5 ft 11 in (1.80 m)
- Position: Right half

Youth career
- 1894–1895: Brewery Rovers
- 1895–189?: Hamworthy St. Michaels

Senior career*
Years	Team	Apps	(Gls)
189?–1900	Poole		
1900–1906	Southampton	174	(8)
1906–1911	Dundee		
1911–1915	Southampton	77	(5)

International career
1904	England	1	(0)
- * Club domestic league appearances and goals

Ernest Albert Lee (19 August 1879 – 14 January 1958) was an English professional footballer who played in the 1902 FA Cup final for Southampton, and also made one appearance for England on 29 February 1904 against Wales. He also played for Dundee, winning the Scottish Cup in 1910.

== Honours ==
Southampton

- FA Cup finalist: 1902
- Southern League championship: 1900–01, 1902–03, 1903–04

Dundee

- Scottish Cup winner: 1910
