= Sandy MacFarlane =

Scottish footballer and manager

Personal information
- Full name: Alexander MacFarlane
- Date of birth: 1878
- Place of birth: Airdrie, Scotland
- Date of death: 22 December 1945 (aged 66–67)
- Place of death: Preston, England
- Position: Inside forward

Youth career
- Baillieston

Senior career*
Years	Team	Apps	(Gls)
1895–1896	Airdrieonians	0	(0)
1896–1897	Woolwich Arsenal	5	(0)
1897–1898	Airdrieonians	22	(17)
1898–1901	Newcastle United	84	(17)
1901–1913	Dundee	293	(68)
1913–1914	Chelsea	4	(0)
Total		408	(102)

International career
1904–1911	Scotland	5	(1)
1904–1911	Scottish Football League XI	3	(1)

Managerial career
- 1919–1925: Dundee
- 1925–1928: Charlton Athletic
- 1928: Dundee
- 1928–1932: Charlton Athletic
- 1933–1935: Blackpool
- * Club domestic league appearances and goals

Alexander MacFarlane (1878 – 22 December 1945) was a Scottish professional football player and manager. As a player, he won the Scottish Cup with Dundee in 1910. As a manager, he won the Third Division South with Charlton Athletic in 1929.

== Playing career ==
MacFarlane first played in Scotland for Airdrieonians before moving south to join Woolwich Arsenal in 1896. He only made seven appearances for Arsenal, his debut coming against Grimsby Town on 28 November 1896, and returned to Airdrie the following year. His second move south of the border was more successful, joining Newcastle and becoming their first-choice inside-left. In three seasons in the north-east, MacFarlane made eighty-four First Division appearances, scoring seventeen goals in three consecutive top six finishes, as well as two FA Cup appearances.

He returned to Scotland to play for Dundee in 1901. During his twelve years there, he won a Scottish Cup in 1909–10 and made five appearances for Scotland between 1904 and 1911, scoring once in a 5–0 victory over Ireland on 15 March 1909 in the British Home Championship. He moved to Chelsea in 1913, but only played sporadically and retired from playing in 1914.

== Managerial career ==
MacFarlane returned to Dundee in 1919 and spent six years in charge of the club, during which time they reached another Scottish Cup final in 1924–25. That summer, Charlton Athletic tempted him to move south. In January 1928 he returned to Dundee, but only lasted seven months before returning to Charlton. In his first full season back at the club, he led Charlton to the 1928–29 Third Division South title.

He left Charlton in 1932 and a year later joined Blackpool on a two-year contract. At Blackpool, he dismantled the Seasiders' squad, allowing nine players to leave Bloomfield Road as he brought in fresh faces. One player he signed, Peter Doherty, cost £1,000 but was sold on to Manchester City in 1936 for ten times that amount. At the end of the 1934–35 season, Blackpool sat in fourth position in the Division Two table, just missing out on a return to the top flight.

Blackpool was MacFarlane's last appointment, and he drifted out of football at the age of 57. He died in Preston, Lancashire, in December 1945.

== Honours ==
=== As a player ===
Dundee

- Scottish Cup: 1910

=== As manager ===
Charlton Athletic

- Third Division South: 1929

=== Individual ===
- Dundee FC Heritage Award: 2015
- Dundee FC Hall of Fame: 2015
