= George Langlands =

Scottish footballer

Personal information
- Full name: George Milne Langlands
- Date of birth: 1886
- Place of birth: Forfar, Scotland
- Date of death: 1951 (aged 64–65)
- Place of death: Forfar, Scotland
- Position: Inside left

Senior career*
Years	Team	Apps	(Gls)
1907–1908	Forfar Athletic		
1908–1920	Dundee	115	(24)
1920–1925	Forfar Athletic	131	(16)
Total		246	(40)
- * Club domestic league appearances and goals

George Milne Langlands (1886–1951) was a Scottish footballer who played as an inside left for Dundee and Forfar Athletic. He was a member of the Dundee team that won the Scottish Cup in 1910 (in the first of three matches in the final, he scored the last-minute equaliser which forced a replay), having been runners-up in the Scottish Football League the previous season.

In a career interrupted by World War I, he returned to hometown club Forfar Athletic (where he had also started out) after the conflict and was an important member of the team during the years when they moved up from the Scottish Football Alliance to become an SFL club.
