= 1910–11 Scottish Division One =

18th season of top-tier football league in Scotland

Scottish Division One
- Season: 1910–11
- Champions: Rangers

The 1910–11 Scottish Division One season was won by Rangers by four points over nearest rival Aberdeen.

== League table ==
Pos	Team	Pld	W	D	L	GF	GA	GD	Pts
1	Rangers (C)	34	23	6	5	90	34	+56	52
2	Aberdeen	34	19	10	5	53	28	+25	48
3	Falkirk	34	17	10	7	65	42	+23	44
4	Partick Thistle	34	17	8	9	50	41	+9	42
5	Celtic	34	15	11	8	48	18	+30	41
6	Dundee	34	18	5	11	54	42	+12	41
7	Third Lanark	34	16	7	11	59	53	+6	39
8	Clyde	34	14	11	9	45	36	+9	39
9	Hibernian	34	15	6	13	44	48	−4	36
10	Kilmarnock	34	12	10	12	42	45	−3	34
11	Airdrieonians	34	12	9	13	49	53	−4	33
12	St Mirren	34	12	7	15	46	57	−11	31
13	Morton	34	9	11	14	49	51	−2	29
14	Heart of Midlothian	34	8	8	18	42	59	−17	24
15	Raith Rovers	34	7	10	17	36	55	−19	24
16	Hamilton Academical	34	8	5	21	31	60	−29	21
17	Motherwell	34	8	4	22	37	66	−29	20
18	Queen's Park	34	5	4	25	28	80	−52	14

Rules for classification: Teams finish equal if level on points. Points system: 2 points for a win, 1 point for a draw, 0 points for a loss
(C) Champions

== Results ==
Home \ Away	ABE	AIR	CEL	CLY	DND	FAL	HAM	HOM	HIB	KIL	MOR	MOT	PAR	QPA	RAI	RAN	STM	THI
Aberdeen		1–0	1–0	1–0	0–0	1–0	2–2	3–2	1–1	1–1	3–1	3–0	1–1	5–1	2–0	1–0	2–1	3–1
Airdrieonians	1–3		0–0	2–2	3–1	3–1	0–1	4–1	3–0	3–1	2–1	1–1	2–0	5–2	3–3	1–4	3–2	0–1
Celtic	0–0	3–0		2–0	2–1	0–0	3–0	0–0	2–0	2–0	0–1	3–0	2–0	2–0	5–0	0–1	5–0	0–0
Clyde	0–0	2–0	0–2		1–1	2–1	1–0	4–0	2–0	0–0	0–0	2–0	1–2	3–0	0–0	0–1	1–1	2–0
Dundee	2–0	1–0	1–0	1–0		1–1	2–0	4–1	1–1	2–1	1–2	3–1	2–1	5–0	3–1	0–2	5–1	2–1
Falkirk	1–1	2–1	2–1	4–1	0–1		4–0	3–1	2–1	2–2	3–2	3–1	3–0	3–0	0–0	2–2	3–2	4–2
Hamilton Academical	1–0	1–1	0–1	1–1	1–2	3–2		1–2	1–1	0–2	2–1	1–0	0–1	2–1	3–1	2–4	2–0	1–4
Heart of Midlothian	0–3	2–2	1–1	1–1	2–3	1–1	2–0		2–0	5–0	2–0	1–0	3–1	4–1	0–0	1–4	0–0	0–1
Hibernian	2–1	2–0	0–4	1–1	4–1	1–2	2–1	1–0		0–1	3–3	2–1	1–0	1–0	2–0	1–3	2–0	2–1
Kilmarnock	0–1	0–1	1–0	5–2	2–0	2–2	3–0	3–1	3–1		2–3	1–0	1–1	2–1	1–0	0–2	2–2	1–5
Morton	1–1	0–1	1–1	0–2	1–1	0–1	2–1	2–2	2–2	0–0		3–0	1–1	4–1	1–0	2–2	2–3	2–3
Motherwell	0–1	2–2	2–1	0–2	3–0	0–3	2–2	3–2	1–2	1–0	3–2		2–3	3–3	0–1	1–2	2–0	0–1
Partick Thistle	1–0	2–1	1–1	0–0	3–2	3–1	1–0	2–1	2–1	1–0	1–0	2–1		3–0	3–0	2–2	2–2	1–0
Queen's Park	2–4	0–1	0–1	1–3	1–2	0–2	2–1	2–0	0–1	1–1	0–0	1–0	0–3		2–1	0–4	2–0	1–4
Raith Rovers	0–1	1–1	2–1	1–2	2–1	2–2	2–0	3–2	1–3	1–1	2–0	0–1	2–2	1–1		0–2	4–0	2–2
Rangers	2–4	7–1	1–1	6–1	1–2	1–1	4–0	2–0	4–0	3–0	1–5	7–1	2–0	4–0	4–1		1–0	3–1
St Mirren	2–0	3–1	1–1	0–2	1–0	1–3	1–0	3–0	2–0	1–1	1–2	4–1	2–1	3–1	2–1	2–1		1–2
Third Lanark	2–2	0–0	1–1	2–4	2–0	3–1	3–1	1–0	0–3	0–2	3–2	2–4	4–3	2–1	2–1	1–1	2–2	

Legend: Blue = home team win; Yellow = draw; Red = away team win.
