= List of Scotland international footballers with one cap =

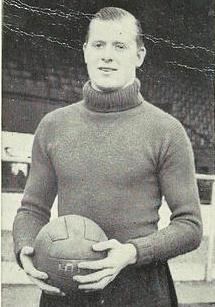
Goalkeeper John Brown, who came from a large sporting family, played once for Scotland in 1938.

The Scotland national football team is the joint-oldest international football team, having played in the first official international match, a goalless draw on 30 November 1872 against England. Since then, the team has established a long-standing rivalry with England, particularly in the annual British Home Championship, which Scotland won 24 times outright and shared a further 17 times. The team has enjoyed less success in continental and global competition. Although Scotland has participated in eight FIFA World Cup and three UEFA European Championship final tournaments, the team has never progressed beyond the first round of any major tournament.

Kenny Dalglish and Andy Robertson are the only men to have won more than 100 caps for Scotland, and Dalglish was the only Scottish player named in the FIFA 100. Denis Law, who shares with Dalglish the record for the most goals scored for the national team, is the only Scottish player to have won the European Footballer of the Year award. The Scottish Football Association maintains a roll of honour for players who have won at least 50 caps. This distinction was launched in March 1998, when 11 players had already achieved that mark.

This list includes all Scotland players who have made one appearance for the national team.

== List of players ==
Key

*	Still active for the national team

As of Scotland v North Macedonia, 13 November 2026

Scotland national football team players with one cap
Name	Refs.	Caps	Goals	Appearance	
Name	Refs.	Caps	Goals	Date	Opponent
Walter Aitkenhead		1	2	16 March 1912	Ireland
George Allan		1	0	3 April 1897	England
Henry Allan		1	0	15 March 1902	Wales
Frederick Anderson		1	1	7 March 1874	England
George Anderson		1	0	23 February 1901	Ireland
Harry Anderson		1	0	28 February 1914	Wales
Johnny Anderson		1	0	25 May 1954	Finland
Peter Andrews		1	1	6 March 1875	England
Jordan Archer		1	0	30 May 2018	Peru
Archie Baird		1	0	23 January 1946	Belgium
Hugh Baird		1	0	2 May 1956	Austria
William Baird		1	0	27 March 1897	Ireland
Alexander Barbour		1	1	14 March 1885	Ireland
Darren Barr		1	0	20 August 2008	Northern Ireland
Connor Barron*		1	0	9 June 2025	Liechtenstein
Barney Battles, Jr.		1	1	25 October 1930	Wales
Bobby Beattie (Note: The Scottish FA website attributes an appearance by Andy Beattie on 8 October 1938 to Bobby Beattie.)		1	0	9 November 1938	Wales
Alex Bell		1	0	16 March 1912	Ireland
Cammy Bell		1	0	16 November 2010	Faroe Islands
Mark Bell		1	0	2 March 1901	Wales
David Black		1	1	9 March 1889	Ireland
Ian Black		1	0	10 April 1948	England
Ian Black		1	0	15 August 2012	Australia
John Blackburn		1	0	8 March 1873	England
Jimmy Blair		1	0	19 October 1946	Wales
John Blair		1	0	4 October 1933	Wales
William Blair		1	0	21 March 1896	Wales
William Bowie		1	0	28 March 1891	Ireland
George Bowman		1	0	19 March 1892	Ireland
Jimmy Boyd		1	0	16 September 1933	Ireland
Tom Bradshaw		1	0	31 March 1928	England
Tom Brandon		1	0	4 April 1896	England
Thomas Breckenridge		1	1	24 March 1888	Ireland
Des Bremner		1	0	7 April 1976	Switzerland
Bernard Breslin		1	0	20 March 1897	Wales
Dod Brewster		1	0	9 April 1921	England
Eamonn Brophy		1	0	8 June 2019	Cyprus
Jim Brown		1	0	1 June 1975	Romania
John Brown		1	0	9 November 1938	Wales
Bob Brown (Note: The Scottish FA website attributes appearances by Bob Brown and Robert Brown to Robert Brown.)		1	0	22 March 1890	Wales
Robert Brown		1	0	23 March 1885	Wales
Sandy Brown		1	0	9 April 1904	England
John Browning		1	0	28 February 1914	Wales
Bobbie Bruce		1	0	29 November 1933	Austria
Daniel Bruce		1	0	22 March 1890	Wales
John Buchanan		1	0	9 March 1889	Ireland
Peter Buchanan		1	1	8 December 1937	Czechoslovakia
Robert Buchanan		1	1	21 March 1891	Wales
Francis Burns		1	0	5 November 1969	Austria
Matt Busby		1	0	4 October 1933	Wales
Paul Caddis		1	0	24 March 2016	Czech Republic
David Calderhead		1	0	9 March 1889	Ireland
Patrick Callaghan		1	0	3 March 1900	Ireland
John Cameron		1	0	20 March 1886	Ireland
John Cameron		1	0	28 March 1896	Ireland
Allan Campbell		1	0	14 June 2022	Armenia
Harry Campbell		1	0	15 April 1889	Wales
Jimmy Campbell		1	0	3 March 1913	Wales
Jimmy Campbell		1	0	23 January 1946	Belgium
John Campbell (Note: The Scottish FA website merges the statistics of John Campbell (active in the 1880s) and John Campbell (born 1872) into a single profile.)		1	1	27 March 1880	Wales
Peter Campbell (Note: The Scottish FA website merges the statistics of Peter Campbell (Morton FC, active in the 1890s) and Peter Campbell (Rangers FC, active in the 1870s) into a single profile.)		1	0	19 March 1898	Wales
Peter Canero		1	0	28 April 2004	Denmark
Stewart Chalmers		1	0	23 February 1929	Ireland
William Chalmers		1	0	14 March 1885	Ireland
Thomas Chambers		1	1	24 March 1894	Wales
George Chaplin		1	0	7 March 1908	Wales
Robert Christie		1	0	15 March 1884	England
John Clelland		1	0	28 March 1891	Ireland
Robert Clements		1	0	28 March 1891	Ireland
William Collier		1	0	4 February 1922	Wales
Tom Collins		1	0	1 March 1909	Wales
Alfie Conn, Sr.		1	1	2 May 1956	Austria
John Connolly		1	0	22 June 1973	Switzerland
James Connor (Note: The Scottish FA website merges the statistics of James Connor (active in the 1880s) and Jimmy Connor (active in the 1930s) into a single profile.)		1	0	20 March 1886	Ireland
Billy Cowan		1	1	12 April 1924	England
Jim Craig		1	0	22 November 1967	Wales
Joe Craig		1	1	27 April 1977	Sweden
Tommy Craig		1	0	7 April 1976	Switzerland
John Cross		1	0	21 March 1903	Ireland
Mick Cullen		1	0	2 May 1956	Austria
David Cumming		1	0	9 April 1938	England
Warren Cummings		1	0	23 May 2002	Hong Kong League XI
Murray Davidson		1	0	14 November 2012	Luxembourg
Stewart Davidson		1	0	9 April 1921	England
Johnny Deakin		1	0	23 January 1946	Belgium
Archie Devine		1	1	5 March 1910	Wales
John Dick		1	0	11 April 1959	England
William Dickson		1	4	24 March 1888	Ireland
John Divers		1	1	23 March 1895	Wales
John Divers		1	0	8 October 1938	Ireland
Ross Doohan		1	0	9 June 2025	Liechtenstein
Jimmy Dougal		1	1	15 April 1939	England
Neil Dougall		1	0	19 October 1946	Wales
Bobby Dougan		1	0	26 April 1950	Switzerland
Angus Douglas		1	0	18 March 1911	Ireland
Barry Douglas		1	0	27 March 2018	Hungary
Jimmy Douglas		1	0	27 March 1880	Wales
Peter Dowds		1	0	19 March 1892	Ireland
Robert Downie		1	0	26 March 1892	Wales
Johnny Doyle		1	0	17 December 1975	Romania
Michael Dunbar		1	1	20 March 1886	Ireland
Johnny Duncan		1	1	31 October 1925	Wales
Jimmy Duncanson		1	0	27 November 1946	Ireland
Billy Dunlop		1	0	7 April 1906	England
James Dunlop		1	0	22 February 1930	Ireland
Dave Ellis		1	1	19 March 1892	Ireland
Jock Ewart		1	0	9 April 1921	England
Robert Findlay		1	0	19 March 1898	Wales
Stuart Findlay		1	1	13 October 2019	San Marino
Charlie Fleming		1	2	3 October 1953	Northern Ireland
Robert Fleming		1	0	20 March 1886	Ireland
Jim Forrest		1	0	19 April 1958	England
James Fraser		1	0	28 March 1891	Ireland
John Fraser		1	0	16 March 1907	Ireland
William Fulton		1	0	26 January 1884	Ireland
John Fyfe		1	0	23 March 1895	Wales
Patrick Gallacher		1	1	20 October 1934	Ireland
Paul Gallagher		1	0	18 February 2004	Wales
Mike Galloway		1	0	16 October 1991	Romania
Ian Gardiner		1	0	13 November 1957	Wales
Dave Gardner		1	0	20 March 1897	Wales
William Gibb		1	1	8 March 1873	England
John Gilchrist		1	0	8 April 1922	England
Michael Gilhooley		1	0	4 February 1922	Wales
James Gillespie		1	3	19 March 1898	Wales
John Gillespie		1	0	21 March 1896	Wales
John Gilmour		1	0	25 October 1930	Wales
Stephen Glass		1	0	14 October 1998	Faroe Islands
Ronnie Glavin		1	0	27 April 1977	Sweden
James Gossland		1	2	26 January 1884	Ireland
John Goudie		1	1	26 January 1884	Ireland
James Gourlay (Note: The Scottish FA website merges the statistics of James Gourlay (born 1860) and James Gourlay (born 1862) into a single profile.)		1	0	10 March 1888	Wales
James Gourlay		1	1	20 March 1886	Ireland
Donald Gow		1	0	17 March 1888	England
John Gow (Note: The Scottish FA website merges the statistics of John Gow (born 1859) and John Gow (born 1869) into a single profile.)		1	0	21 March 1885	England
John Gow		1	0	24 March 1888	Ireland
Alex Graham		1	0	26 February 1921	Ireland
Johnny Graham		1	0	26 January 1884	Ireland
Archie Gray		1	0	21 March 1903	Ireland
Woodville Gray		1	0	27 March 1886	England
David Haddow		1	0	7 April 1894	England
Gladstone Hamilton		1	0	17 March 1906	Ireland
James Hamilton (Note: The Scottish FA website merges the statistics of James Hamilton (born 1901) and James Hamilton (active in the 1890s) into a single profile.)		1	0	1 March 1924	Ireland
Thomas Hamilton (Note: The Scottish FA website merges the statistics of Thomas Hamilton (born 1872) and Thomas Hamilton (born 1906) into a single profile.)		1	0	28 March 1891	Ireland
Thomas Hamilton		1	0	9 April 1932	England
Willie Hamilton		1	0	27 May 1965	Finland
Steven Hammell		1	0	17 November 2004	Sweden
Paul Hanlon		1	0	14 October 2020	Czech Republic
Andrew Hannah		1	0	10 March 1888	Wales
Jimmy Hannah		1	0	15 April 1889	Wales
Neil Harris		1	0	12 April 1924	England
Mike Haughney		1	0	3 April 1954	England
Charles Heggie		1	4	20 March 1886	Ireland
George Henderson		1	0	26 March 1904	Ireland
Bob Hepburn		1	0	19 September 1931	Ireland
Jock Hepburn		1	0	21 March 1891	Wales
Sandy Herd		1	0	20 October 1934	Ireland
Alex Higgins		1	3	14 March 1885	Ireland
David Hill (Note: The Scottish FA website merges the statistics of David Hill (born 1881) and David Hill (active in the 1880s) into a single profile.)		1	0	17 March 1906	Ireland
Bobby Hogg		1	0	15 May 1937	Czechoslovakia
James Hogg		1	0	4 March 1922	Ireland
Stewart Houston		1	0	29 October 1975	Denmark
William Howden		1	0	18 March 1905	Ireland
Hugh Howie		1	1	23 October 1948	Wales
Jimmy Howieson		1	0	26 February 1927	Ireland
Billy Hughes		1	0	16 April 1975	Sweden
Stephen Hughes		1	0	10 October 2009	Japan
Wilson Humphries		1	0	30 May 1952	Sweden
John Hunter (Note: The Scottish FA website merges the statistics of John Hunter (born 1878) and John Hunter (active in the 1870s) into a single profile.)		1	0	1 March 1909	Wales
Richard Hunter		1	0	29 March 1890	Ireland
James Hutton		1	0	19 February 1887	Ireland
John Inglis (Note: The Scottish FA website merges the statistics of John Inglis (a goalkeeper, born 1857) and John Inglis (a forward, born 1859) into a single profile.)		1	0	26 January 1884	Ireland
James Irons		1	0	3 February 1900	Wales
Andy Irving*		1	0	9 June 2025	Liechtenstein
Tom Jenkinson		1	1	19 February 1887	Ireland
Bert Johnston		1	0	8 December 1937	Czechoslovakia
James Johnstone		1	0	10 March 1888	Wales
John Johnstone		1	1	24 March 1894	Wales
Hughie Kelly		1	0	30 April 1952	United States
Liam Kelly		1	0	14 November 2012	Luxembourg
Tommy Kelso		1	0	28 February 1914	Wales
Joe Kennaway		1	0	29 November 1933	Austria
Jack Kennedy (Note: The Scottish FA website attributes an appearance by Sandy Kennedy on 25 March 1876 to Jack Kennedy.)		1	0	20 March 1897	Wales
John Kennedy		1	0	31 March 2004	Romania
Sam Kennedy		1	0	6 March 1905	Wales
Peter Kerr		1	0	1 March 1924	Ireland
George Key		1	0	1 March 1902	Ireland
William Key		1	0	16 March 1907	Ireland
William King		1	0	27 October 1928	Wales
Jimmy Kinloch		1	0	4 March 1922	Ireland
Arthur Kinnaird		1	0	8 March 1873	England
David Kinnear		1	1	8 December 1937	Czechoslovakia
Walter Lamont		1	1	14 March 1885	Ireland
Archibald Lang		1	0	27 March 1880	Wales
Jimmy Lawrence		1	0	1 April 1911	England
Denis Lawson		1	0	14 April 1923	England
Robert Leckie		1	0	30 November 1872	England
David Lindsay		1	0	21 March 1903	Ireland
Alec Linwood		1	1	9 November 1949	Wales
John Little		1	0	6 May 1953	Sweden
Alex Lochhead		1	0	15 April 1889	Wales
James Logan		1	1	21 March 1891	Wales
Tommy Logan		1	0	15 March 1913	Ireland
Jimmy Logie		1	0	5 November 1952	Northern Ireland
Hugh Long		1	0	27 November 1946	Ireland
William Longair		1	0	31 March 1894	Ireland
Alex Low		1	0	16 September 1933	Ireland
James Low		1	1	28 March 1891	Ireland
Tommy Low		1	0	27 March 1897	Ireland
James Lowe		1	1	19 February 1887	Ireland
James Lundie		1	0	10 April 1886	Wales
Jack Lyall		1	0	1 April 1905	England
John Macaulay		1	0	26 January 1884	Ireland
Alex MacDonald		1	0	7 April 1976	Switzerland
John Macdonald		1	0	27 March 1886	England
Rab Macfarlane		1	0	21 March 1896	Wales
Angus MacKinnon		1	1	7 March 1874	England
Bobby Main		1	0	30 October 1937	Wales
James Main		1	0	15 March 1909	Ireland
Gordon Marshall		1	0	17 May 1992	United States
John Martis		1	0	22 October 1960	Wales
David Mathers		1	0	25 May 1954	Finland
William Maxwell		1	0	2 April 1898	England
Stevie May		1	0	18 November 2014	England
James McAdam		1	1	27 March 1880	Wales
Jamie McAllister		1	0	30 May 2004	Trinidad and Tobago
Andrew McAtee		1	0	3 March 1913	Wales
Edward McBain		1	0	24 March 1894	Wales
Archie McCall		1	0	24 March 1888	Ireland
Neil McCallum		1	1	24 March 1888	Ireland
William McCartney		1	0	1 March 1902	Ireland
William McColl		1	0	23 March 1895	Wales
John McCorkindale		1	0	21 March 1891	Wales
Bob McCormick		1	1	10 April 1886	Wales
Jock McDougall		1	0	27 February 1926	Ireland
Willie McFarlane		1	0	24 May 1947	Luxembourg
James McGhee		1	0	10 April 1886	Wales
Paul McGinn		1	0	7 September 2021	Austria
Jimmy McGowan		1	0	23 January 1946	Belgium
Francis McGurk		1	0	4 October 1933	Wales
Hugh McHardy		1	0	14 March 1885	Ireland
Tom McInnes		1	1	9 March 1889	Ireland
William McIntosh		1	0	18 March 1905	Ireland
Hugh McIntyre		1	0	27 March 1880	Wales
James McIntyre		1	0	29 March 1884	Wales
Barrie McKay		1	0	4 June 2016	France
Bobby McKay		1	0	29 October 1927	Wales
John Reid McKay		1	0	16 February 1924	Wales
Bobby McKean		1	0	7 April 1976	Switzerland
James McKee		1	2	19 March 1898	Wales
Duncan McKenzie		1	0	10 November 1937	Ireland
Tom McKillop		1	0	21 May 1938	Netherlands
Andy McLaren		1	0	25 April 2001	Poland
David McLean		1	0	23 March 1912	England
George McLean (Note: The Scottish FA website attributes an appearance made by Tommy McLean on 16 October 1968 to George McLean.)		1	0	30 May 1968	Netherlands
William McLeod		1	0	20 March 1886	Ireland
Jimmy McLuckie		1	0	4 October 1933	Wales
John McMenemy		1	0	4 October 1933	Wales
James McMillan		1	0	20 March 1897	Wales
Thomas McMillan		1	0	19 February 1887	Ireland
Jock McNab		1	0	17 March 1923	Wales
Josh McPake*		1	0	6 October 2026	Slovenia
David Murray McPherson		1	0	19 March 1892	Ireland
John McPherson		1	0	6 March 1875	England
Robert McPherson		1	1	11 March 1882	England
Danny McRorie		1	0	25 October 1930	Wales
John McTavish		1	0	19 March 1910	Ireland
Peter Meechan		1	0	28 March 1896	Ireland
Alex Menzies		1	0	7 April 1906	England
Robert Middleton		1	0	22 February 1930	Ireland
Archie Miller		1	0	9 November 1938	Wales
Charlie Miller		1	0	25 April 2001	Poland
William Miller		1	0	4 March 1876	England
Willie Moir		1	0	15 April 1950	England
Henry Morris		1	3	1 October 1949	Ireland
Tom Morrison		1	0	2 April 1927	England
Willie Muir		1	0	16 March 1907	Ireland
John Murdoch		1	0	21 February 1931	Ireland
Frank Murphy		1	1	21 May 1938	Netherlands
John Murray (Note: The Scottish FA website merges the statistics of John Murray (born 1865) and John Murray (born 1874) into a single profile.)		1	0	23 March 1895	Wales
John Murray		1	0	22 March 1890	Wales
Steve Murray		1	0	10 November 1971	Belgium
George Mutch		1	0	9 April 1938	England
Robbie Neilson		1	0	11 October 2006	Ukraine
Tommy Niblo		1	0	9 April 1904	England
Jimmy Niven		1	0	14 March 1885	Ireland
Phil O'Donnell		1	0	8 September 1993	Switzerland
Duncan Ogilvie		1	0	29 November 1933	Austria
John O'Neil		1	0	25 April 2001	Poland
Frank O'Rourke		1	1	16 March 1907	Ireland
James Orr		1	0	26 March 1892	Wales
Robert Orrock		1	0	3 March 1913	Wales
John Paterson		1	0	10 April 1920	England
Daniel Paton		1	1	21 March 1896	Wales
William Paul (Note: The Scottish FA website merges the statistics of William Paul and Willie Paul into a single profile.)		1	0	28 March 1891	Ireland
Jackie Plenderleith		1	0	9 November 1960	Northern Ireland
William Porteous		1	0	21 March 1903	Ireland
Charlie Pringle		1	0	12 February 1921	Wales
Peter Pursell		1	0	28 February 1914	Wales
James Raeside		1	0	3 March 1906	Wales
Calvin Ramsay		1	0	16 November 2022	Turkey
Henry Renny-Tailyour		1	1	8 March 1873	England
Alex Rhind		1	0	30 November 1872	England
Andrew Richmond		1	0	3 March 1906	Wales
Archie Ritchie		1	0	21 March 1891	Wales
Billy Ritchie		1	0	2 May 1962	Uruguay
John L. Ritchie		1	1	20 March 1897	Wales
George Robertson		1	0	8 December 1937	Czechoslovakia
Hugh Robertson		1	0	29 November 1961	Czechoslovakia
Jimmy Robertson		1	0	3 October 1964	Wales
Peter Robertson		1	0	21 March 1903	Ireland
Tommy Robertson (Note: The Scottish FA website merges the statistics of Tommy Robertson (born 1876) and Thomas Robertson (born 1864) into a single profile.)		1	1	26 March 1898	Ireland
Doug Rougvie		1	0	13 December 1983	Northern Ireland
John Russell		1	0	29 March 1890	Ireland
Eddie Rutherford		1	0	23 May 1948	France
Steven Saunders		1	0	16 November 2010	Faroe Islands
Bill Sawers		1	0	23 March 1895	Wales
Peter Scarff		1	0	21 February 1931	Ireland
Erich Schaedler		1	0	27 March 1974	West Germany
Jim Scott		1	0	11 May 1966	Netherlands
Matthew Scott		1	0	19 March 1898	Wales
Robert Scott		1	0	31 March 1894	Ireland
William Semple		1	0	10 April 1886	Wales
Andrew Shinnie		1	0	14 November 2012	Luxembourg
Jackie Sinclair		1	0	18 June 1966	Portugal
Leslie Skene		1	0	12 March 1904	Wales
Cieran Slicker		1	0	6 June 2025	Iceland
Tom Sloan		1	0	12 March 1904	Wales
James Smith		1	0	30 November 1872	England
John Smith		1	0	12 April 1924	England
George Somerville		1	1	27 March 1886	England
Jimmy Speirs		1	0	7 March 1908	Wales
Lewis Stevenson		1	0	30 May 2018	Peru
Andrew Stewart		1	0	24 March 1894	Wales
David Stewart		1	0	7 September 1977	East Germany
Duncan Stewart		1	0	24 March 1888	Ireland
Willie Summers		1	0	17 April 1926	England
Scot Symon		1	0	7 December 1938	Hungary
Tommy Tait		1	0	6 March 1911	Wales
Willie Taylor		1	0	2 April 1892	England
Paul Telfer		1	0	29 March 2000	France
Willie Telfer		1	0	4 November 1953	Wales
Alexander Thomson		1	1	15 March 1909	Ireland
Bertie Thomson (Note: The Scottish FA website merges the statistics of Bertie Thomson and Robert Thomson into a single profile.)		1	1	31 October 1931	Wales
Charlie M. Thomson		1	0	15 May 1937	Czechoslovakia
David Thomson		1	0	26 February 1920	Wales
Jock Thomson (Note: The Scottish FA website merges the statistics of Jock Thomson and John Thomson into a single profile.)		1	0	26 October 1932	Wales
Robert Thomson		1	0	2 April 1927	England
William Thomson (Note: The Scottish FA website merges the statistics of William Thomson (Dundee FC player) and William Thomson (Dumbarton FC player) into a single profile.)		1	0	21 March 1896	Wales
Tom Townsley		1	0	31 October 1925	Wales
Thomas Turner		1	0	29 March 1884	Wales
Duncan Urquhart		1	0	4 October 1933	Wales
Hugh Wales		1	0	26 October 1932	Wales
Frank Walker		1	0	4 February 1922	Wales
Jimmy Walker		1	0	23 January 1946	Belgium
Ross Wallace		1	0	10 October 2009	Japan
Bobby Watson		1	0	14 June 1971	Soviet Union
James Watson		1	1	23 March 1878	Wales
Phil Watson		1	0	29 November 1933	Austria
William Watson		1	0	19 March 1898	Wales
Tony Watt		1	0	24 March 2016	Czech Republic
Willie Watt		1	1	19 February 1887	Ireland
Willie Waugh		1	0	8 December 1937	Czechoslovakia
John Weir		1	0	19 February 1887	Ireland
Alex Wilson		1	0	25 May 1954	Finland
David Wilson		1	0	5 April 1913	England
David Wilson		1	2	3 February 1900	Wales
Hugh Wilson (Note: The Scottish FA website merges the statistics of Hugh Wilson and Leitch Keir into a single profile.)		1	0	23 March 1885	Wales
Mark Wilson		1	0	9 February 2011	Northern Ireland
Paul Wilson		1	0	5 February 1975	Spain
Robbie Winters		1	0	28 April 1999	Germany
Keith Wright		1	0	19 February 1992	Northern Ireland
Thomas Wyllie		1	0	29 March 1890	Ireland
Benny Yorston		1	0	21 February 1931	Ireland
Harry Yorston		1	0	16 October 1954	Wales
James Young		1	0	17 March 1906	Ireland

== See also ==
- List of Scotland international footballers (2–3 caps)
- List of Scotland international footballers (4–9 caps)
- List of Scotland international footballers (10+ caps)
- Scotland national football team roll of honour (50+ caps)
