= 1883–84 British Home Championship =

Tournament details
- Host country: England, Ireland, Scotland and Wales
- Dates: 26 January – 29 March 1884
- Teams: 4

Final positions
- Champions: Scotland (1st title)
- Runners-up: England

Tournament statistics
- Matches played: 6
- Goals scored: 30 (5 per match)
- Top scorer: (England) Henry Cursham (3 goals)

The 1883–84 British Home Championship was the inaugural international football tournament, played between the Home Nations of the British Isles which at the time made up the constituent nations of the United Kingdom; England, Scotland, Wales and Ireland. International football matches had begun with annual games played between England and Scotland in 1872 and they had been joined by Wales in 1876 and Ireland in 1882.

The tournament was played in an unusual layout, with Ireland playing all three of their games first, and losing heavily in each one. Then England and Scotland played what would eventually be the deciding match of the tournament, which Scotland won in a close fought contest. Finally, Wales played both England and Scotland, losing heavily to each in turn and thus granting Scotland victory in the first British Home Championship. Scotland won the final match, even though many of the best Scottish players were absent playing for Queen's Park FC in the 1884 FA Cup Final, which took place on the same day.

== Table ==
Pos	Team	Pld	W	D	L	GF	GA	GD	Pts
1	Scotland (C)	3	3	0	0	10	1	+9	6
2	England	3	2	0	1	12	2	+10	4
3	Wales	3	1	0	2	7	8	−1	2
4	Ireland	3	0	0	3	1	19	−18	0

Rules for classification: 1) Points. The points system worked as follows: 2 points for a win and 1 point for a draw.
(C) Champions

== Results ==
26 January 1884

Ireland	0–5	Scotland
		Harrower 12', 86'; Gossland 30', 70'; Goudie 60'

Ulster Cricket Ground, Belfast
Attendance: 2,000
Referee: Thomas Hindle (England)

9 February 1884

Wales	6–0	Ireland
Owen 55', 70'; Shaw 20', 68'; Eyton-Jones 82'; Jones 59'

Racecourse Ground, Wrexham
Attendance: 2,000
Referee: Robert Sloane (England)

23 February 1884

Ireland	1–8	England
McWha 88'		Cursham; Johnson 15'; C. Bambridge; A. Bambridge

Ulster Cricket Ground, Belfast
Attendance: 3,000
Referee: Thomas Lawrie (Scotland)

15 March 1884

Scotland	1–0	England
Smith 7'

Cathkin Park, Glasgow
Attendance: 10,000
Referee: John Sinclair (Ireland)

17 March 1884

Wales	0–4	England
		Bromley-Davenport 7', 85'; Gunn 90'; Bailey 75'

Racecourse Ground, Wrexham
Attendance: 4,500
Referee: Sydney Broadfoot (Scotland)

29 March 1884

Scotland	4–1	Wales
Lindsay 22'; Shaw 49'; Kay 65', 87'		Roberts 15'

Cathkin Park, Glasgow
Attendance: 5,000
Referee: Robert M. Sloane (England)

== Winning squad ==
- Scotland

Name	Apps/Goals by opponent			Total	
Name	(Wales) WAL	(Ireland) IRE	(England) ENG	Apps	Goals
John Forbes	1	1	1	3	0
Joe Lindsay	1/1		1	2	1
Frank Shaw	1/1		1	2	1
Walter Arnott		1	1	2	0
William McKinnon	1		1	2	0
Robert S. Brown	1	1		2	0
Sammy Thomson	1	1		2	0
William Harrower		1/2		1	2
James Gossland		1/2		1	2
John Kay	1/2			1	2
John Smith			1/1	1	1
John Goudie		1/1		1	1
James McAulay			1	1	0
Charles Campbell			1	1	0
John McPherson			1	1	0
William Anderson			1	1	0
Robert Christie			1	1	0
John Inglis		1		1	0
John Graham		1		1	0
William Fulton		1		1	0
John Macaulay		1		1	0
Thomas Turner	1			1	0
Michael Paton	1			1	0
Sandy Kennedy	1			1	0
James McIntyre	1			1	0
