= History of East Stirlingshire F.C. =

Scottish football club history

East Stirlingshire F.C. is a Scottish association football club from the town of Falkirk, formed in 1881. The club played regional football until 1900 when the club was elected into the Scottish Football League, taking the place of Linthouse.

The club experienced success during the late 1800s, reaching the Scottish Cup quarter-finals twice and winning the regional Stirlingshire Cup for four successive seasons. The club won regional leagues such as the Midland League and Central Football Combination before election to the Scottish Football League in 1900, competing in Scotland's top-tier on two occasions in 1932–33 and 1963–64. The club has suffered financially in the past decade and has regularly finished bottom of the Scottish Football League during this period.

== Formation and early history: 1880–1900 ==
East Stirlingshire's official date of formation was in 1881, but its origins can be traced to the previous year in 1880 when a local cricket club called Bainsford Bluebonnets formed a football team under the name Britannia. The team's first ever recorded match was against Falkirk's second eleven and resulted in a 7–0 defeat. After the footballers broke away from the cricket club in 1881, they changed the name of the club to its present name of East Stirlingshire which is where the club gets its nickname "The Shire". Under its new guise, the club played one of its first known matches in a friendly against neighbours Falkirk, losing 5–0. After joining the Scottish Football Association, the club became eligible to compete in the Scottish Cup, which is Scotland's main association football knock-out competition. East Stirlingshire first entered the cup in 1882, eliminated in the first round 2–1 by Milngavie Thistle. In December 1883, the Stirlingshire Football Association was founded, resulting in the establishment of a new regional tournament called the Stirlingshire Cup, which was open to clubs exclusively from the county of Stirlingshire. The inaugural season of the tournament saw East Stirlingshire and Falkirk contest the final, the latter winning 3–1 in a replay after an initial 1–1 draw.

The latter years of the 19th century was the most successful period in East Stirlingshire's history in terms of in the Scottish Cup. In the 1888–89 season, East Stirlingshire reached the quarter-finals, recording the club's highest ever win in the tournament and equalling it in successive rounds with a 10–1 victory against local rivals Stenhousemuir in the first round and an 11–2 win over Vale of Bannock in the second round. The club was eventually eliminated in the quarter-finals 2–1, after a very closely fought encounter with a new football team – Celtic – who reached the final of the tournament in their first season in the competition. Two seasons later, East Stirlingshire again reached the Scottish Cup quarter-finals in what was to be the last time for 91 years, this time losing to Heart of Midlothian who went on to win the final. The earlier rounds of the tournament saw East Stirlingshire record an 8–2 victory against Grangemouth in round one and a 10–6 win against Camelon in a third round replay.

Between 1885 and 1889, East Stirlingshire won the Stirlingshire Cup four consecutive seasons, a record that remains. The run included 19 rounds without a defeat and an emphatic 9–0 victory against Falkirk in the 1888 final. It was during this period that four East Stirlingshire players earned international caps for their countries. The first was the Wales national team captain, Humphrey Jones, who earned five of his fourteen caps whilst with the club between 1889 and 1890. Three other players, David Alexander, Archibald Ritchie, and James McKee made appearances for the Scotland national team between 1891 and 1898.

== Election to the Scottish Football League: 1900–1914 ==
Chart showing the progress of East Stirlingshire F.C. through the Scottish football league system from 1900–01 to 2011–12

East Stirlingshire was elected to the Scottish Football League in 1900–01 to replace Linthouse who failed re-election the season before. At the time, the league consisted of two tiers and East Stirlingshire joined the second tier. The club's first ever victory in the league was a 3–0 away win against Motherwell at Fir Park in August 1900. The club ended its first season ranked 7th from ten. In March 1905, a proposal was raised for the club to merge with neighbours Falkirk with an aim to creating a bigger and more financially stable club, which Falkirk accepted in a vote. However, East Stirlingshire's vote was not as unanimous and the club's chairman, John Rutherford, cast the deciding vote and rejected the proposal with both clubs remaining separate entities. The years following included finishing bottom of the league in 1905–06, recording only one win from 22 games, contrasting with finishing as high as third in table in 1912–13, narrowly missing out on winning the championship by two points behind champions Ayr United and runners-up Dunfermline Athletic. The club remained in Division Two until 1914–15 when it, and the Scottish Cup, were both suspended due to the outbreak of World War I.

== Inter-war years: 1919–1939 ==
After the end of World War I, the club was re-elected to join the old Division Two which was re-established in the 1921–22 season. The year beforehand saw East Stirlingshire move to Firs Park after leaving their old ground of Merchiston Park in 1920. Shortly after Firs Park opened, the club's record home attendance was set when 12,000 spectators watched the club take on the eventual champions, Partick Thistle, in a Scottish Cup third round match in February 1921. In 1922–23, the club finished second-bottom in Division Two and was relegated to the newly created, but short lived, Division Three, earning promotion back to Division Two after only one season. It was during this season the East Stirlingshire recorded its longest unbeaten home record with 23 games without a loss. Had they not achieved promotion they would almost certainly have lost their place in the Scottish Football league when this level was abandoned in 1925.

A decade later, East Stirlingshire won promotion to Division One, Scotland's top flight, for the first time. En route to promotion, the club spent 32 weeks at the top of Division Two, ending the season equal on 55 points with St Johnstone, with East Stirlingshire winning the championship by virtue of a superior goal average. East Stirlingshire spent only one season in its first spell in the top flight, ending the year bottom of the league in 20th, amassing a total of seventeen points. Despite being relegated, the club was only one of two teams in the league to win both encounters against Aberdeen, one of which was East Stirlingshire's only away league win of the season in a 3–1 victory at Pittodrie in front of 10,000 spectators. Back in Division Two in the 1935–36 season, East Stirlingshire's heaviest league defeat was inflicted by Dundee United in April 1936. With only one point separating the two clubs in the mid-table before the match, Dundee United won 12–1 at Tannadice Park. In 1938–39, the final season before the league was suspended due to World War II, East Stirlingshire finished second-bottom of the league, ahead of only Edinburgh City, who had occupied the bottom spot for six of the previous eight seasons. Despite finishing low in the league, Malcolm Morrison became East Stirlingshire's highest league goalscorer in a single season with 36 goals.

== Post-war exclusion and re-election: 1939–1964 ==
The club was excluded from a wartime league in 1939 and was also denied re-entry to the Scottish Football League Division Two at the end of World War II, along with six other small league clubs. As a result, East Stirlingshire competed in a newly created Division C along with pre-war clubs such as Montrose, Leith Athletic and Brechin City. The league also consisted of the reserve teams of some of Scotland's top clubs. In the second season in Division C, East Stirlingshire won the league and earned promotion back to Division Two, now renamed "Division B", but the club finished last in the league after only one season in 1948–49 and were relegated back to the "C Division".

After another six seasons competing in "Division C" the club rejoined Division Two in 1955–56 when the " C Division" was abolished and the number of teams in the Scottish Football League was expanded. In the 1962–63 season, the club won promotion to the top flight for a second time as runners-up in Division Two behind, ironically, champions St Johnstone. Like the previous occasion in 1932–33, East Stirlingshire spent one solitary season in Scotland's top tier before being relegated.

== Merger with Clydebank Juniors F.C.: 1964–65 ==
After relegation from Scotland's top flight, East Stirlingshire was controversially merged with Clydebank Juniors in 1964, a junior football club based in the town of Clydebank. The merge was the idea of East Stirlingshire's businessmen owners, Jack and Charlie Steedman, who renamed the club East Stirlingshire Clydebank – often E.S. Clydebank for short – and relocated to Kilbowie Park in Clydebank despite the fans' wishes. However, the merge lasted only one season, with East Stirlingshire shareholders winning several court cases against it and thus the club reverted to its original legal status and moved back to Falkirk, parting company with the Steedman brothers, who reformed a senior Clydebank team which was elected to the Scottish Football League in 1966. During the single season as E.S. Clydebank, the club set a record attendance at Kilbowie Park when 14,900 spectators attended a Scottish Cup first round replay against Hibernian in February 1965.

== First manager and league reconstruction: 1965–1981 ==
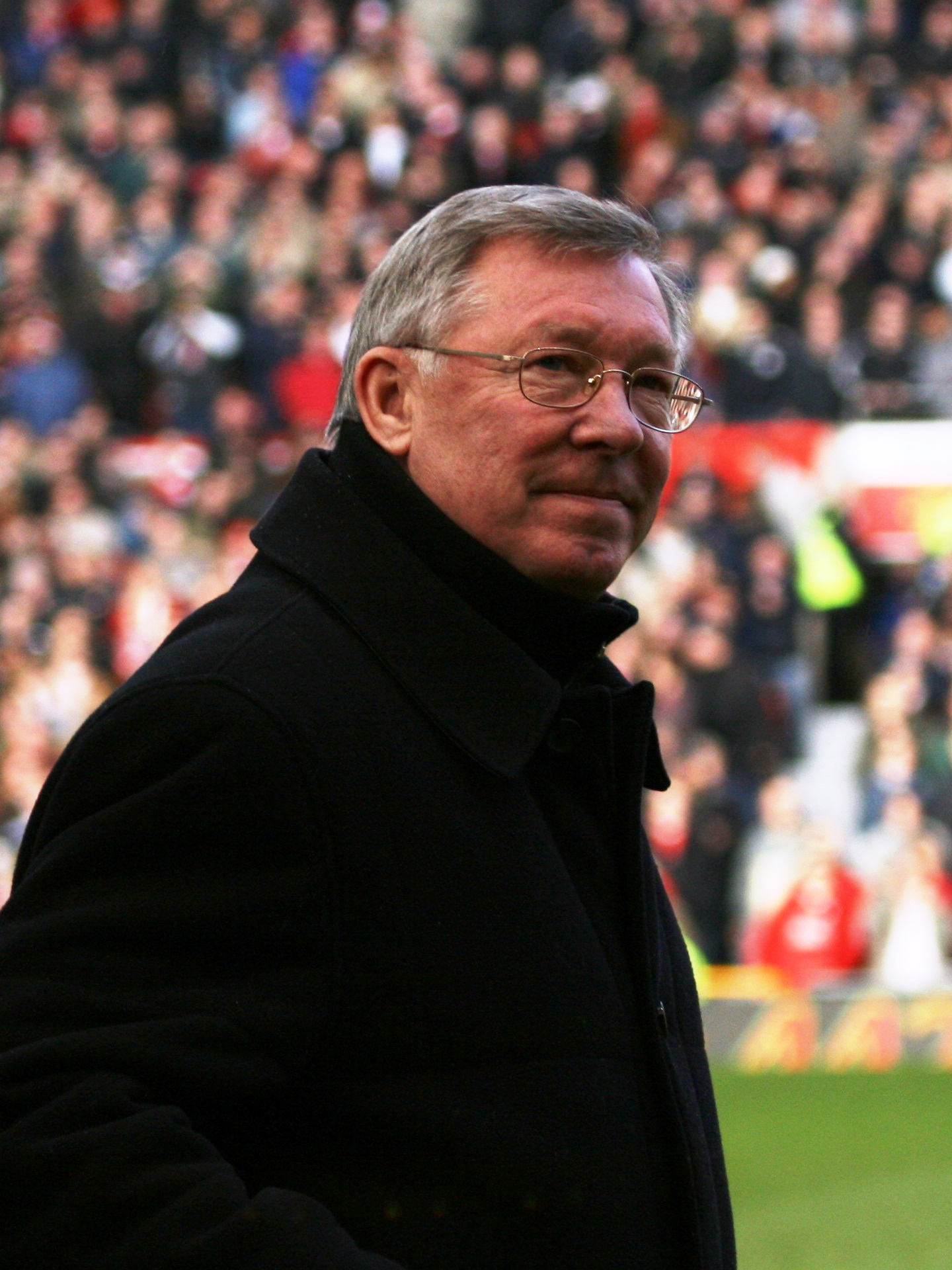
Alex Ferguson was East Stirlingshire manager in 1974, his first managerial position

In 1966, Lawrence Binnie became the club's first official manager, prior to his appointment the board of directors took responsibility for management roles. After de-merging with Clydebank Juniors, the club spent a further 10 seasons in Division Two before being moved by league reconstruction to a new Second Division for the 1975–76 season, now the third tier, to make way for a new Premier Division at the top of the Scottish Football League. During this period, the club reached the supplementary round of the Scottish League Cup for the first time ever since it was inaugurated in 1947, progressing past the group stages after 18 consecutive seasons of being eliminated at this stage. The year beforehand saw the club appoint its most famous manager, Alex Ferguson, who was at the club during 1974 before moving to St Mirren.

In 1979–80, East Stirlingshire won promotion to the First Division, which is currently the last time the club was promoted in the league. Managed by Billy Lamont, the club finished runners-up by one point to rivals Falkirk in the Second Division. The clubs shared the top two spots in the league for the majority of the season and entered the final match equal on 48 points, with East Stirlingshire required to better Falkirk's result to win the championship due to an inferior goal difference. However, Falkirk won its match and East Stirlingshire managed only a 1–1 draw away to Brechin City and had to settle for second position.

== Third Division/League Two era: 1994–2016 ==
In the 1994–95 season, the Scottish Football League was again restructured and East Stirlingshire was moved from the old Second Division to create a new Third Division, now the fourth-tier. The club finished its first season in the Third Division ranked fourth from ten and repeated it again in 1997–98. With these exceptions East Stirlingshire generally finished below mid-table, including a final day victory against Arbroath in the 1996–97 season to leapfrog the club and avoid finishing last. In 2000–01, the club reached the semi-final of a national cup competition for the first time in its history, losing 2–1 to Livingston for a place in the final of the Scottish Challenge Cup.

At the start of the 21st century the club struggled financially; as a result East Stirlingshire ranked last in the Scottish Football League for five consecutive seasons from 2002–03 to 2006–07, losing 24 consecutive league games in the 2003–04 season, recording only 8 points from two wins and two draws in 36 games.

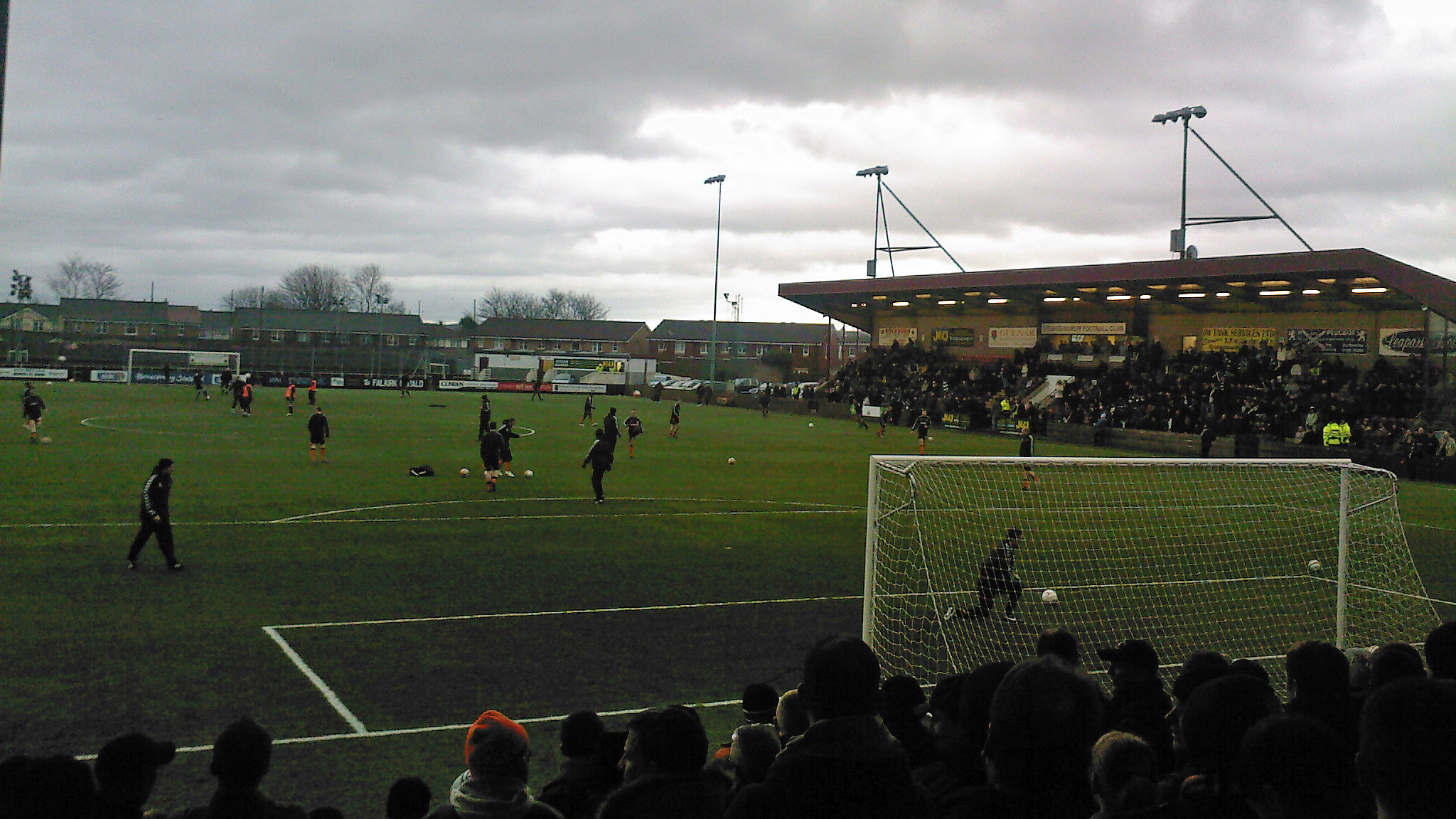
Warm up before a Scottish Cup match between East Stirlingshire and Dundee United at Ochilview Park in 2009

From the 2005–06 season, the Scottish Football League determined if any club finished bottom of the Third Division twice in successive years, the club would face the risk of being reduced to associate member status, meaning the loss of voting rights. As East Stirlingshire finished last in successive years, a league vote was held and concluded in favour of the club retaining its full member status with the condition that it did not finish last the following season. Another final day victory saw the club move off the bottom of the table in a 3–1 win against Montrose which was the last ever game at Firs Park, the club's home ground for 87 years. The following season, retaining its full member status, the club moved to Ochilview Park in a ground-share agreement with neighbours Stenhousemuir. Under new manager Jim McInally, the club finished third in successive years to qualify for the promotion play-offs to the Second Division.

In the 2010–11 Scottish Cup, East Stirlingshire initially reached the fifth round of the tournament with a 1–0 victory against Buckie Thistle at Ochilview Park but was expelled a week later for failing to register the loan extension of Falkirk goalkeeper Michael Andrews to the Scottish Football Association, who therefore became ineligible to play for the club. At the end of season 2015–16, East Stirlingshire, having finished bottom of League Two, faced a play-off against Edinburgh City for a place in League Two in season 2016–17. The first leg of the play-off at Meadowbank Stadium on Saturday 7 May ended in a 1–1 draw, with the second leg at Ochilview ending in a one-nil defeat for The Shire after they conceded a last minute penalty. They subsequently became the first team to be demoted from the professional league set-up into the Lowland League.

== Lowland League: 2016-Present ==
East Stirlingshire adapted relatively well to life in the Lowland League, putting in a strong title bid in their first season after relegation, but ultimately finished second, 7 points behind East Kilbride, and missed out on the promotion play-offs.

In 2017–18, Shire again competed strongly for the Lowland League title, though despite club's going 19 games unbeaten, the long unbeaten run in its history, they finished in 4th place, 9 points behind champions Spartans. East Stirlingshire announced that they would be leaving Ochilview Park at the end of 2017–18, ending a 10-year stint at the ground. They will play their home games at the Falkirk Stadium from 2018 to 2019.
