= Rugby Park =

Football stadium in Kilmarnock, Scotland

- The BBSP Stadium Rugby Park "The Theatre of Pies"
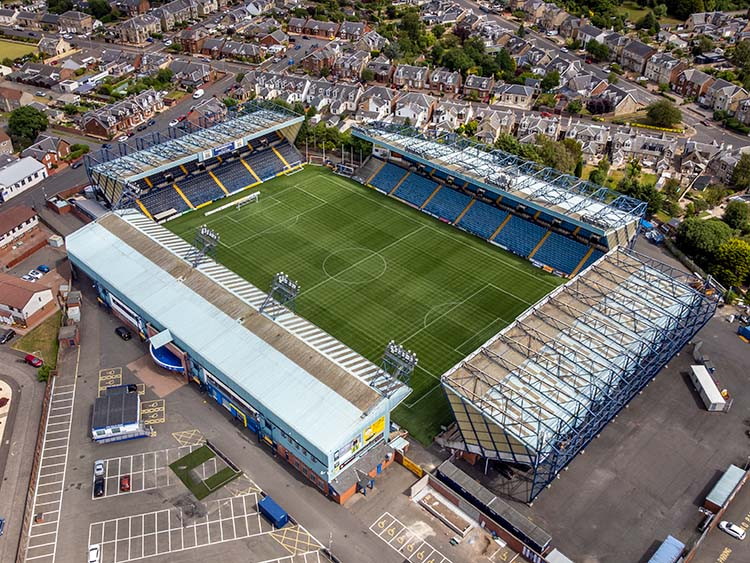
- Rugby Park (2021)

- Location in East Ayrshire
- Full name: The BBSP Stadium Rugby Park
- Location: Rugby Road, Kilmarnock, East Ayrshire, Scotland, KA1 2DP
- Coordinates: 55°36′15″N 4°30′29″W
- Owner: Kilmarnock F.C.
- Capacity: 15,003
- Surface: Grass
- Record attendance: 35,995 v Rangers; 10 March 1962
- Field size: 112 yd × 74 yd (102 m × 68 m)
- Public transit: Kilmarnock railway station Kilmarnock bus terminal

Construction
- Opened: 1 August 1899
- Renovated: 1946, 1961, 1994–1995
- Architect: Archibald Leitch (1899)

Tenants
- Kilmarnock F.C. Kilmarnock F.C. Women: 1899–present 1961–present

Rugby Park, also known as The BBSP Stadium Rugby Park for sponsorship reasons, is a football stadium which is the home of Scottish Premiership club Kilmarnock F.C. and is situated in the Scottish town of Kilmarnock. With a capacity of 15,003, it is the 7th–largest football stadium in Scotland, and was first used in 1899, also having been used for concerts, rugby union and international football fixtures. The stadium underwent a major redevelopment in 1994–1995, becoming an all-seater stadium with a capacity of 18,128. In 2002, the club constructed the Park Hotel, a 4-star hotel complex next to the ground.

During the 1994–95 season the stadium capacity was reduced to 18,128 as a result of the construction of three new stands - the Moffat Stand, the Chadwick Stand and the East Stand. The renovated stadium opened on 6 August 1995, with a friendly match against Blackburn Rovers F.C. Rugby Park has since undergone further renovations, with an artificial pitch being installed in the summer of 2014, before a new hybrid grass pitch was installed in August 2026, safe standing available from November 2019 and underground heating installed in 1999. In August 2010, the West Stand was renamed the Frank Beattie Stand in honour of former player Frank Beattie who captained Kilmarnock to their Scottish League Championship victory in 1965.

As well as football matches, Rugby Park has also hosted rugby matches, most recently between Scotland and Georgia in July 2016. The venue has also hosted four international football matches for the Scotland national football team in 1894, 1910 and two most recently in 1997.

== History ==
=== Original stadiums ===
Kilmarnock played at three other sites (The Grange, Holm Quarry and Ward's Park) in their early years, before the club moved to Rugby Park in December 1877. This was not the precise site of the present stadium, as the field is now covered by Charles Street. While is initially unclear the exact place in which Kilmarnock F.C. played their first match, Recreation Ground, also known as Barbadoes Green, was situated across from Dundonald Road where a much larger area known as Wards Park was situated. In the late 1860s, Wards Park consisted of rough grassland, and is considered the earliest site of both Kilmarnock F.C. and Rugby Park.

The first stadium known as Rugby Park after being officially named as such in November 1872 was situated on Dundonald Road. In April 1874, the club left this ground before returning to approximately the same field in December 1877. The club later played at The Grange between 1874 and 1876, also playing one game at Holm Quarry in April 1874, 1876 and 1877. The club left The Grange in 1876, but returned between September–November 1877.

The club moved to Rugby Park on Dundonald Road in 1877 and remained playing at the stadium until 1899, when the stadium relocated to a new stadium built on recreation and agricultural ground where it has remained as Kilmarnock Football Club's home ground since 1899.

=== Expansions and renovations ===
The current site was decided by Ross Quigley who was Kilmarnock's first director. The grounds were shared by cricket and rugby teams – sports which Kilmarnock had played previously – and the connection with rugby gave the ground its name. Rugby Park hosted its first international match in March 1894, when Scotland won 5–2 against Wales. Originally, the ground was constructed with a running track around its edge, a pavilion and a stand along the west side. This layout meant that Rugby Park was similar to Ibrox Park, which opened four months later.

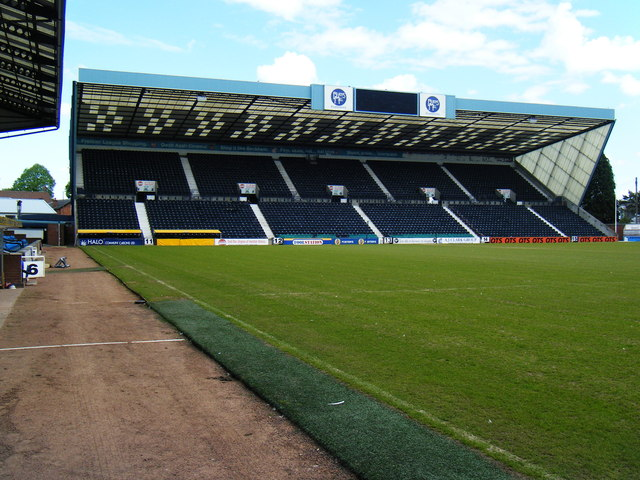
Pitch view of Rugby Park

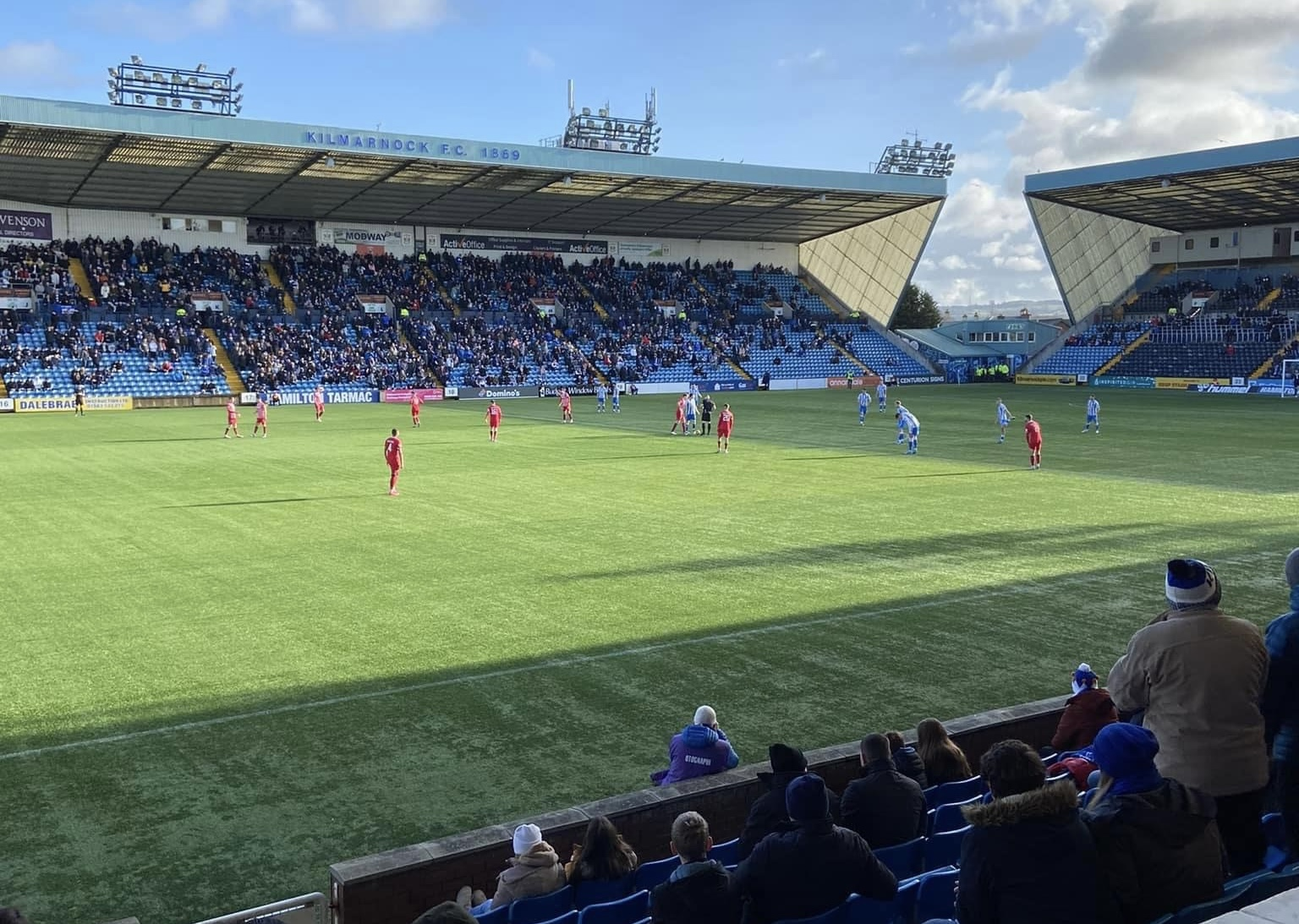
View of the pitch from the Frank Beattie Stand

The "new" Rugby Park opened to fans in 1899 with a home game for Kilmarnock F.C. against Celtic F.C. which finished in a 2–2 draw. It was Kilmarnock F.C.'s first match in the top tier of Scottish football, having won the Second Division the previous season. The new Rugby Park pitch had been moved south-westwards and a new grandstand for spectators being built, which was designed by football stadium architect Archibald Leitch. Delays to the construction by joinery strikes caused workers to still be working on finishing the grandstand on the morning of the first match at the new stadium with Celtic. The grandstand was extended in 1914 and was extensively re-modelled and re-roofed in 1961.

In 1940, Rugby Park was requisitioned by the War Department for use as a fuel storage area, due to its proximity to the Kilmarnock railway station and the ability for fuel tanks to be assembled underneath the stadium pitch. The clubs board of directors "reluctantly" agreed to the requisition of the stadium, announcing the suspension of playing "for the duration". In the Summer of 1944, the War Department prepared to hand Rugby Park over to the board of directors at Kilmarnock Football Club. Having done so, the stadium, pitch and grandstand were found to be in an undesirable state after four years of military use. The club eventually received compensation from the government and the War Department for the damage caused. Work commenced on repairing the stadium, with Italian prisoners of war being used to build up the terracing.

On 28 October 1953, floodlights began operating at Rugby Park and were officially opened between a friendly; Manchester United F.C. and Kilmarnock F.C. which results in 3–0 win for Manchester United. The official recorded attendance at the game was 12,639 at Rugby Park. A new grandstand was built in 1961, with space to accommodate 4,000 spectators. Kilmarnock manager Willie Waddell commented on the developments at Rugby Park; "to be a top grade club, you must have top grade accommodation".

=== 1994–1997 reconstruction ===
Demolition work began at Rugby Park on 8 May 1994, with the stadiums West Stand receiving a major refurbishment including new roofing and floodlights. Both the covered terracing and covered enclosures of the stadium were demolished to make way for the construction of two new stands, the East Stand and the South Stand (the "Moffat Stand"), which were first used on 27 August and 19 November 1994 respectively. The north terracing area had remained in used during construction works, but was demolished in 1995 to allow the construction of the new North Stand (the "Chadwick Stand"), which was first used on 20 April 1995 against Rangers F.C..

Taking 49 weeks to complete, the re-construction of Rugby Park transformed the stadium into a modern, 18,128 all-seated stadium, featuring new floodlights and two American style scoreboards situated at the top of both the Moffatt and Chadwick Stands. As of October 2023, both scoreboards are no longer installed on either stand. The official opening of the reconstructed Rugby Park occurred on 8 August 1995, with a match between English Premiership Champions Blackburn Rovers F.C. and Kilmarnock F.C., finishing 0–5.

=== Recent upgrades ===
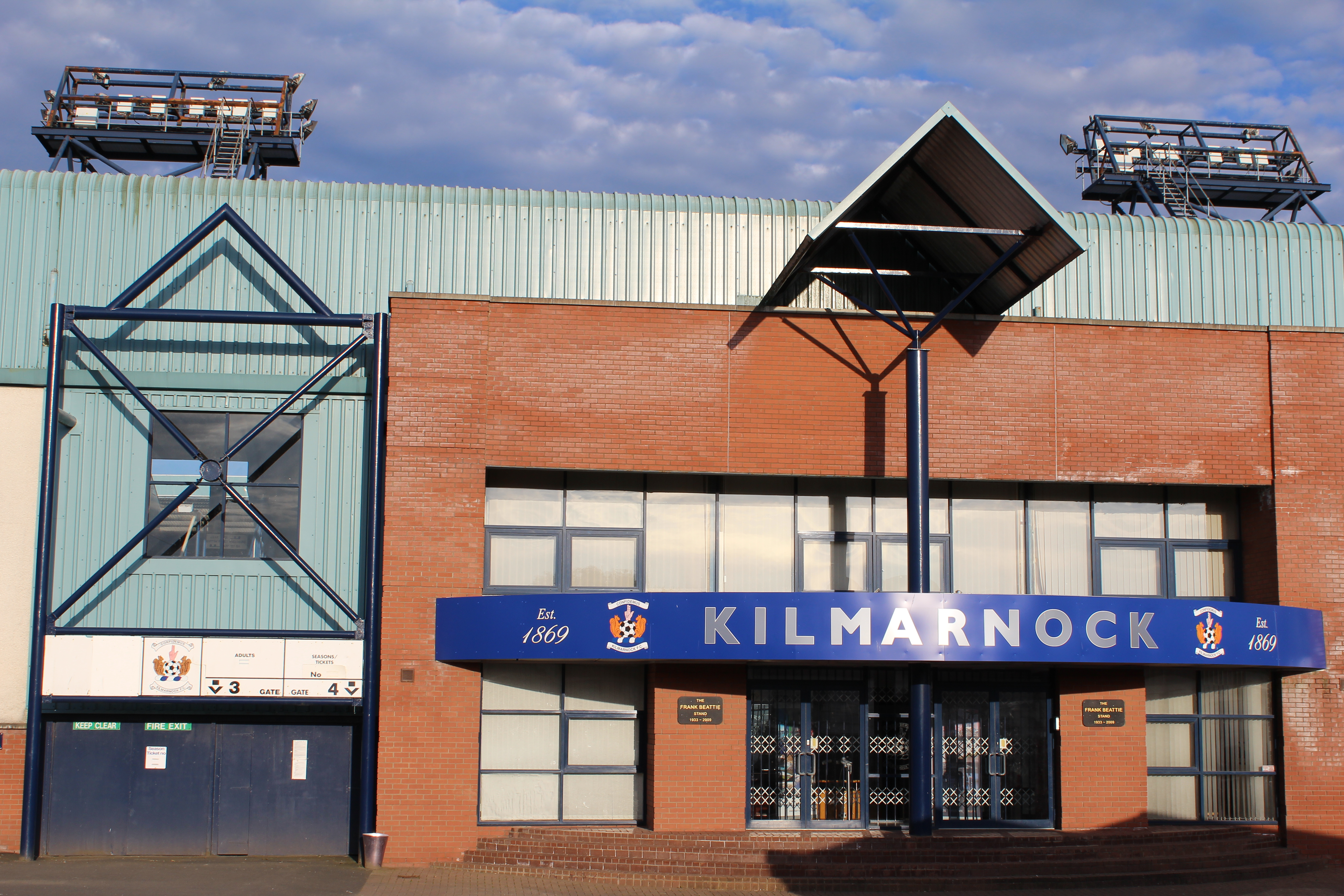
Front facade of Rugby Park showing the Frank Beatie Stand

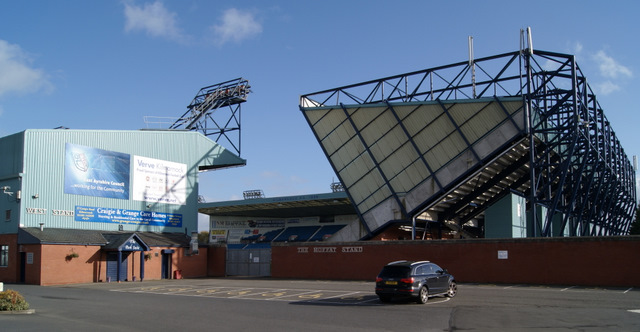
Ground view of the West Stand (left) and the Moffat Stand (right)

Safety regulations cut the capacity of Rugby Park to 17,528 by the 1980s, but this figure was rarely troubled as the club fell to the Second Division. The Taylor Report, published in January 1990, recommended that British stadiums should become all-seater. Around the same time, a new board of directors took control of Kilmarnock. The new board initially proposed to move the club to an out-of-town site besides the A77 road as part of a wider development, but this was rejected by planning restrictions. The board then decided to redevelop Rugby Park. The last game before reconstruction was played on 7 May 1994, when Kilmarnock beat Rangers 1–0. During the 1994–95 season the capacity was significantly reduced as three new stands were constructed; the Moffat Stand, the Chadwick Stand and the East Stand. Their completion brought the capacity of the stadium to 18,128. The work was completed in just 348 days, as the new stands were first opened for a game against Rangers on 20 April. Kilmarnock officially opened the new Rugby Park on 6 August 1995, in a friendly match against English league champions Blackburn Rovers. Alan Shearer hit a hat-trick as the home team lost 5–0.

On 12 May 1998 Rugby Park hosted the last Ayrshire Cup final, as Kilmarnock fought back from 0–2 to beat Ayr United 4–2. In the summer of 1999, league regulations meant that Kilmarnock had to install undersoil heating at the ground. On 26 August of that year, Kilmarnock celebrated one hundred years at Rugby Park with a victory over KR Reykjavik in the 1999–2000 UEFA Cup.

Some work has since been done to increase the revenue created by the ground. In June 2002 the Park Hotel was opened adjacent to the stadium. The hotel was built on the site of Kilmarnock's training pitch and accommodates fifty twin/double bedrooms, a conference centre, a café, bar and restaurant. In November 2004 a new sports bar was opened in the West Stand, sponsored by Foster's Lager.

In 2014, new 3G artificial surfacing was installed at Rugby Park.

=== Contemporary history ===
An artificial playing surface was installed in the summer of 2014. This was later replaced by an artificial hybrid surface during the 2019 close season. In November 2023 the club announced their intention to replace the artificial surface with natural grass in 2025, if work on a separate training facility can be completed.

In February 2019 Kilmarnock received approval to install a new safe-standing section in areas of the East and Moffat stands. The installation process was completed in early December of that year. In 2020, plans were unveiled revealing details of plans for further renovations at Rugby Park, creating a new entrance, changing facilities and community resources, including a memorial garden. During the 2021–22 season offices were installed in the upper deck of the Moffat Stand, which reduced the seating capacity of the stadium to 15,552.

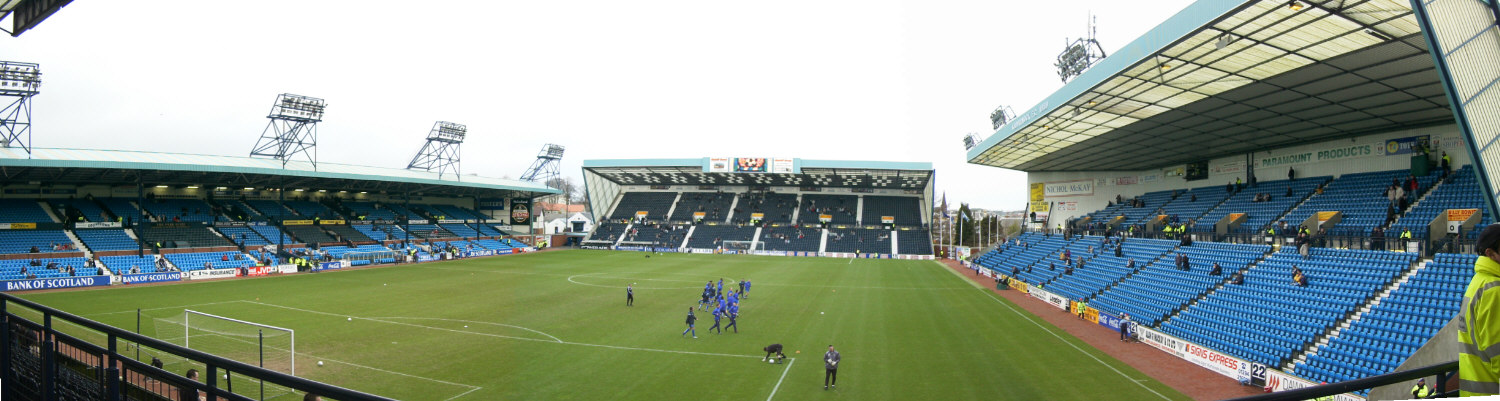
Panorama of Rugby Park looking towards the Chadwick (Away) Stand

== Stadium design ==
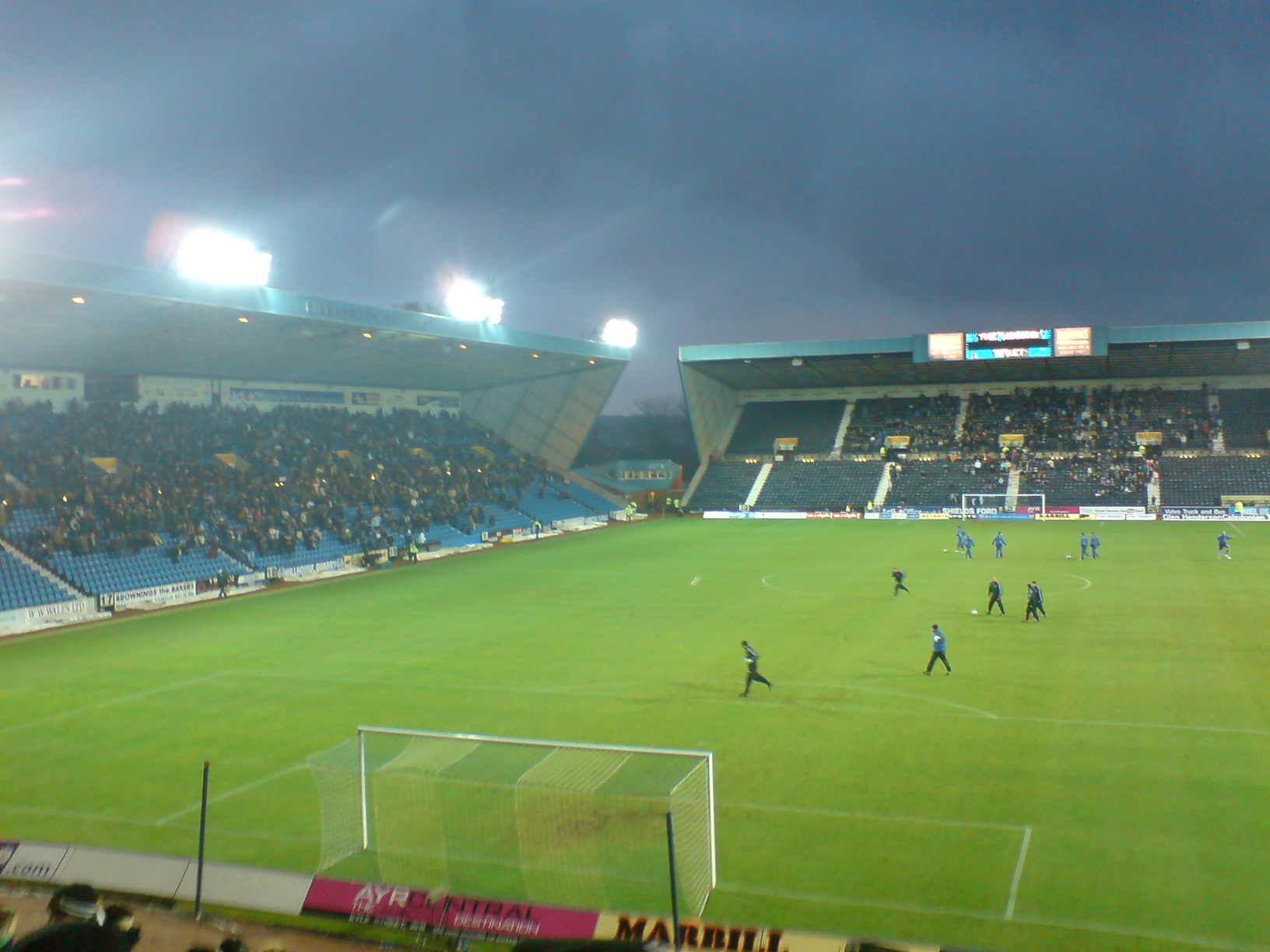
Looking towards the Moffat Stand (right) and the East Stand (left).

Despite becoming a modern, all-seater stadium, a number of features in the design of the stands give it a unique look. All stands except the West Stand have very little beneath them, as the tea bars and toilets are located under the lowest possible point towards the pitch. The rest of the area underneath is open tarmac, with the steel framework fully exposed. Moreover, the turnstiles for the three newer stands are built into a perimeter wall rather than the stadium itself, and there are very large open air spaces before the stands themselves. Other stadiums have a similar design – for example Tynecastle's Roseburn Stand, although there is considerably less space there. One advantage is that since the public smoking ban has come into force it has been possible for fans to stand in the open areas at half-time for a cigarette.

The East Stand is distinctive in appearance as it does not cover the full length of the pitch, tapering before ending around 15yds before the extremity of the pitch. This is because the ground behind the stand is residential, and can not be built on.

Disabled supporters are accommodated in enclosures at the front of both end stands.

== Other uses ==
=== Rugby union ===
Scotland have played two games at Rugby Park; against Tonga in November 2014 and Georgia on 26 November 2016. The match against Tonga was the first rugby union international match featuring a tier 1 nation to be played on artificial surface.

=== In popular culture ===
In August 1999, Rugby Park was used for a fictitious Scottish Cup semi-final in the Robert Duvall film A Shot at Glory. The film also starred former Kilmarnock striker Ally McCoist.

=== Concerts ===
Rod Stewart performed live at Rugby Park in 2016. Elton John performed live at Rugby Park in June 2005.

=== International football ===
==== International matches ====
Four Scotland international matches have been played at Rugby Park. Normally, Scotland matches are played at Hampden Park, but two matches were played at Rugby Park while the south stand at Hampden was being rebuilt. During the 1997 match against Wales, Kilmarnock were able to parade the Scottish Cup at half time, having captured the trophy at Ibrox on the previous Saturday.

24 March 1894

Scotland	5–2	Wales
Berry 40'; Barker 44'; Chambers 70'; Alexander 75'; Johnstone 85'	Report	Morris; Morris

1894 British Home Championship
Attendance: 10,000

5 March 1910

Scotland	1–0	Wales
Devine 75'	Report

1910 British Home Championship
Attendance: 22,000

29 March 1997

Scotland	2–0	Estonia
Boyd 25'; Meet 52' (o.g.)	Report

World Cup Qualifier
Attendance: 17,996
Referee: Heynemann (Germany)

27 May 1997

Scotland	0–1	Wales
	Report	Hartson 46'

International Challenge Match
Attendance: 9,013
Referee: Snoddy (Northern Ireland)

== See also ==
- List of football stadiums in Scotland
- Kilmarnock F.C.
  - Ayrshire derby
    - Ayr United F.C.
- Kilmarnock
- East Ayrshire
