= 1883–84 in Scottish football =

Football in Scotland
- Season: 1883–84

1883–84 in Scottish football

Scottish Cup winners
- Queen's Park

Scotland national team
- 1884 BHC

The 1883–84 season was the 11th season of competitive football in Scotland. This season saw the introduction of the British Home Championship, with Scotland winning the inaugural contest. In addition, two further regional competitions were played for the first time with the inaugural Forfarshire Cup and Stirlingshire Cup.

== Honours ==
=== Cup honours ===
==== National ====
Vale of Leven asked for a postponement to the date of the Scottish Cup Final due to bereavements, illness etc. but the Scottish Football Association refused and awarded the cup to Queen's Park.

Competition	Winner	Score	Runner-up
Scottish Cup	Queen's Park	w.o. (Note: Match awarded as a Walkover.)	Vale of Leven

==== County ====
Competition	Winner	Score	Runner-up
Ayrshire Cup	Kilmarnock	1 – 0 (Note: Replay needed.)	Hurlford
Buteshire Cup	Cumbrae	4 – 1	St Blane's
East of Scotland Shield	Hibernian	7 – 0	St Bernard's
Fife Cup	Dunfermline Athletic	2 – 0	Alloa Athletic
Forfarshire Cup	Arbroath	2 – 1	Dundee Harp
Lanarkshire Cup	Cambuslang	4 – 0	Dykehead
Renfrewshire Cup	St Mirren	7 – 1 (Note: Fourth replay needed.)	Thornliebank
Stirlingshire Cup	Falkirk	3 – 1	East Stirlingshire

==== Other ====
Competition	Winner	Score	Runner-up
Glasgow Charity Cup	Queen's Park	8 – 0	3rd Lanark RV

== Scotland national team ==
Scotland won the inaugural British Home Championship after defeating Ireland, England and Wales

Date	Venue	Opponents	Score (Note: Scotland's score is shown first.)	Competition	Scotland scorers
26 January 1884	Ulster Cricket Ground, Belfast	Ireland	5 – 0	British Home Championship	William Harrower (2), James Gossland (2), John Goudie
15 March 1884	Cathkin Park, Glasgow	England	1 – 0	British Home Championship	John Smith
29 March 1884	Cathkin Park, Glasgow	Wales	4 – 1	British Home Championship	Joseph Lindsay, Frank Shaw, John Kay (2)

Pos	Team	Pld	W	D	L	GF	GA	GD	Pts
1	Scotland (C)	3	3	0	0	10	1	+9	6
2	England	3	2	0	1	12	2	+10	4
3	Wales	3	1	0	2	7	8	−1	2
4	Ireland	3	0	0	3	1	19	−18	0

Rules for classification: 1) Points. The points system worked as follows: 2 points for a win and 1 point for a draw.
(C) Champions
