= 1893–94 British Home Championship =

Tournament details
- Host country: England, Ireland, Scotland and Wales
- Dates: 24 February – 7 April 1894
- Teams: 4

Final positions
- Champions: Scotland (7th title)
- Runners-up: England

Tournament statistics
- Matches played: 6
- Goals scored: 29 (4.83 per match)
- Top scorer(s): (Ireland) Olphie Stanfield (England) John Veitch (3 goals)

The 1893–94 British Home Championship was an edition of the annual international football tournament played between the British Home Nations. It was won by Scotland in a close competition in which neither Scotland nor England lost a game but Scotland managed to accumulate one more point than England with a victory over Ireland.

Wales and Ireland began the tournament, Wales winning the match easily 4–1 and gaining an early advantage. Ireland's second match was against England and the Irish managed to hold their opponents to a 2–2 draw in a very tough match. England recovered to beat Wales, scoring five goals, but this total was matched by Scotland in their first match. Scotland also managed to beat Ireland, the Irish again only narrowly missing out on victory, losing 1–2. In the final game of the competition England and Scotland played, Scotland only needing a draw to achieve the trophy. Despite a very strong encounter, the Scots held England to a 2–2 draw and took the tournament by a single point.

== Table ==
Team	Pld	W	D	L	GF	GA	GD	Pts
Scotland (C)	3	2	1	0	9	5	+4	5
England	3	1	2	0	9	5	+4	4
Wales	3	1	0	2	7	11	−4	2
Ireland	3	0	1	2	4	8	−4	1

Rules for classification: 1) points. The points system worked as follows: 2 points for a win and 1 point for a draw.
(C) Champions

== Results ==
24 February 1894

Wales	4–1	Ireland
Lewis 55', 82'; James 40'; Rea 75'		Stanfield 20'

St Helens Rugby Ground, Swansea
Attendance: 7,000
Referee: John Campbell(Scotland)

3 March 1894

Ireland	2–2	England
Stanfield 70'; Gibson 83'		Devey 43'; Spiksley 55'

Solitude, Belfast
Attendance: 8,000
Referee: Thomas Park (Scotland)

12 March 1894

Wales	1–5	England
Bowdler 10'		Veitch 30', 55', 80'; Gosling 85'; Perry 31' (o.g.)

Racecourse Ground, Wrexham
Attendance: 5,500
Referee: Thomas Park(Scotland)

24 March 1894

Scotland	5–2	Wales
Berry 40'; Barker 44'; Chambers 70'; Alexander 75'; Johnstone 85'		Morris 15', 40'

Rugby Park, Kilmarnock
Attendance: 10,000
Referee: Joseph McBride (Ireland)

31 March 1894

Ireland	1–2	Scotland
Stanfield 65'		Torrans 25' (o.g.); Taylor 28'

Solitude, Belfast
Attendance: 6,000
Referee: Edward Phennah (Wales)

7 April 1894

Scotland	2–2	England
Lambie 7'; McPherson 75'		Goodall 35'; Reynolds 85'

Celtic Park, Glasgow
Attendance: 45,017
Referee: John Reid (Ireland)

== Winning squad ==
- Scotland

Name	Apps/Goals by opponent			Total	
Name	(Wales) WAL	(Ireland) IRE	(England) ENG	Apps	Goals
David Alexander	1/1	1		2	1
James Blessington		1	1	2	0
David Crawford	1	1		2	0
William Lambie			1/1	1	1
John McPherson			1/1	1	1
Jack Taylor		1/1		1	1
John Barker	1/1			1	1
Davidson Berry	1/1			1	1
Thomas Chambers	1/1			1	1
John Johnstone	1/1			1	1
Isaac Begbie			1	1	0
Dan Doyle			1	1	0
William Gulliland			1	1	0
David Haddow			1	1	0
Andrew McCreadie			1	1	0
David Mitchell			1	1	0
Donald Sillars			1	1	0
Sandy McMahon			1	1	0
Frank Barrett		1		1	0
Jock Drummond		1		1	0
Sandy Keillor		1		1	0
William Longair		1		1	0
Robert Marshall		1		1	0
Robert Scott		1		1	0
David Stewart		1		1	0
Andrew Baird	1			1	0
Bob Foyers	1			1	0
James Kelly	1			1	0
Edward McBain	1			1	0
Andy Stewart	1			1	0
