= John Macaulay =

John Macaulay may refer to:

- John Macaulay (politician) (1792–1857), political figure in Upper Canada
- John Simcoe Macaulay (1791–1855), another political figure in Upper Canada
- John MacAulay (1895-1978), Canadian lawyer and chairman of the International Red Cross and Red Crescent Societies
- John Macaulay (American football) born 1959, American football player in the NFL
- John Macaulay (footballer) (fl. 1884), Scottish football player (national team)
