= Archibald Ritchie =

Archibald Ritchie may refer to:

- Archibald Ritchie (British Army officer)
- Archibald Ritchie (footballer, born 1868)
- Archibald Ritchie (footballer, born 1894)
- Archibald Alexander Ritchie (1806–1856), American ship captain, China trader, and California businessman
