= Edwin James =

Edwin James may refer to:

- Edwin James (barrister) (c. 1812–1882), English lawyer, Member of Parliament and would-be actor
- Edwin James (scientist) (1797–1861), American botanist, geographer, geologist and explorer
- Edwin Leland James (1890–1951), American newspaper editor
- Edwin James (footballer) (1869–?), Welsh footballer
- E. O. James (1888–1972), anthropologist in the field of comparative religion
- Eddy James (1874–1937), Australian rules footballer
