= Peter Campbell (Greenock Morton footballer) =

Scottish footballer

Personal information
- Full name: Peter Campbell
- Date of birth: 17 January 1875
- Place of birth: Greenock, Scotland
- Date of death: 4 May 1948 (aged 73)
- Place of death: Greenock, Scotland
- Position: Left half

Youth career
- Greenock Volunteers

Senior career*
Years	Team	Apps	(Gls)
1894–1895	Glasgow Perthshire		
1895–1896	Burton Swifts		
1896–1898	Morton	34	(2)
1898–1899	Burton Swifts		
1899–1903	Morton	44	(0)

International career
1898	Scotland	1	(0)
- * Club domestic league appearances and goals

Peter Campbell (17 January 1875 – 4 May 1948) was a Scottish footballer who played for Glasgow Perthshire, Burton Swifts, Greenock Morton and Scotland.

== See also ==
- List of Scotland international footballers with one cap
