= Matthew Scott (footballer, born 1872) =

Scottish footballer

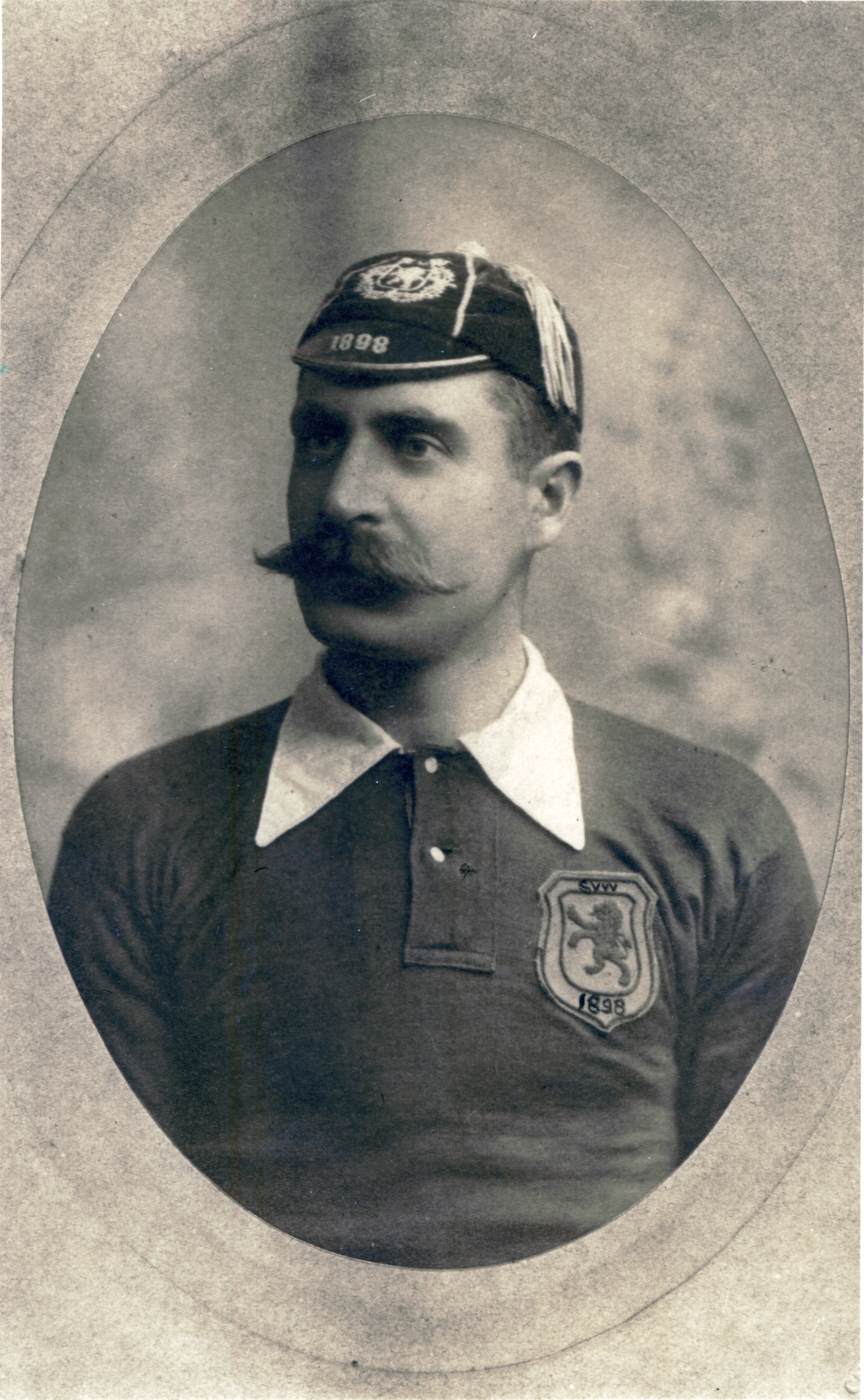
- Scott wearing his Scotland cap.

Personal information
- Full name: Matthew McLintock Scott
- Date of birth: 11 July 1872
- Place of birth: Airdrie, Scotland
- Date of death: 14 August 1941 (aged 69)
- Place of death: Glasgow, Scotland
- Height: 5 ft 10 in (1.78 m)
- Position: Full back

Senior career*
Years	Team	Apps	(Gls)
1890–1900	Airdrieonians	77	(3)
1900–1901	Newcastle United	5	(0)
1902–1903	Albion Rovers		
1904–1906	Airdrieonians	14	(0)

International career
1898	Scotland	1	(0)
- * Club domestic league appearances and goals

Matthew McLintock Scott (11 July 1872 – 14 August 1941) was a Scottish footballer who captained Scotland against Wales in the 1897–98 British Home Championship. He played most of his career at Airdrieonians, but also played for one season at Newcastle United and Albion Rovers. As a footballer, he was considered a "powerfully built full back."

== Early life ==
Scott was born in Airdrie, a town in North Lanarkshire, Scotland, in 1872. He was the son of Daniel Scott, who worked as an engine fitter on the railway at Airdrie, and Helen (née McLintock). At the age of 18, Matthew Scott was working as a commercial clerk in Airdrie.

== Football career ==
Scott first joined Airdrieonians in September 1890, playing as a full back. He "kicked the ball long and with purpose" and specialised in clearances off the line. In a survey of Scottish footballers published in The Scottish Referee in 1894, Scott, "in conjunction with his partner Bob McFarlane, are known throughout Lanarkshire as Scotland's defenders. They could make the Welshmen trot around."

On 19 March 1898, Scott captained the Scotland national football team against Wales at Fir Park, as part of the 1897–98 British Home Championship. Scott played full back and the result was a 5–2 victory for Scotland.

Scott signed for Newcastle United for the 1900–01 season, having been brought in as cover for Dave Gardner. He played five matches in total and his debut was against Sheffield United on 8 December 1900, playing as a left back. He was described as being a "touch slow when against a winger with pace". For the duration of this season, Scott resided in Newcastle as a boarder of Mrs Isobel Harrison, a widow who lived at 136 Croydon Road.

Scott returned to Airdrieonians after his season at Newcastle, and continued playing for them until 1902 when he signed for Albion Rovers. In February 1903, whilst playing in a match for Albion Rovers against Renton, Scott sustained a "serious wound to the right shin bone". Following this injury Scott was forced to retire from football. Scott has been inducted into the Airdrieonians F.C. Hall of Fame, which was inaugurated in 2002.

== Personal life and family ==
Scott had a number of siblings. An older brother, Robert, also played for Airdrieonians and was capped for Scotland in the 1893–94 British Home Championship. On 28 August 1896, he married Annie Steel in Airdrie. He died on 14 August 1941 in the Royal Glasgow Cancer Hospital.

== See also ==
- List of Scotland national football team captains
- List of Scottish football families
