= William Watson (footballer, born 1873) =

Scottish footballer

Personal information
- Date of birth: 19 April 1873
- Place of birth: Westoe, England
- Date of death: 29 September 1929 (aged 56)
- Place of death: Shotts, Scotland
- Position: Goalkeeper

Senior career*
Years	Team	Apps	(Gls)
1893–1895	Dykehead		
1895–1897	East Stirlingshire		
1897–1898	Falkirk		

International career
1898	Scotland	1	(0)
- * Club domestic league appearances and goals

William Watson (19 April 1873 – 29 September 1929) was a Scottish footballer who played as a goalkeeper.

== Career ==
Watson played club football for Dykehead, East Stirlingshire and Falkirk.

He made one appearance for Scotland in 1898; though largely raised in Shotts, Watson was born in north-east England, which should have disqualified him (and Ireland-born teammate James McKee) from being selected under the rules of the time.
