= William Berry (footballer, born 1867) =

Scottish footballer

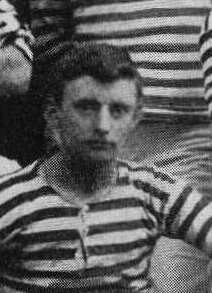

Personal information
- Full name: William Hall Berry
- Date of birth: 20 August 1867
- Place of birth: Calton, Scotland
- Date of death: 5 February 1919 (aged 51)
- Place of death: Hillhead, Scotland
- Position: Inside right

Youth career
- Rawcliffe

Senior career*
Years	Team	Apps	(Gls)
1887–1892	Queen's Park		

International career
1888–1891	Scotland	4	(0)
- * Club domestic league appearances and goals

William Hall Berry (20 August 1867 – 5 February 1919) was a Scottish footballer who played for Queen's Park and the Scotland national team.

Berry, an inside right, joined Queen's Park from local club Rawcliffe as a teenager and remained with the Glasgow club for the remainder of his football career. He won the Scottish Cup with the club in 1890 and won four caps for the Scotland national team between 1888 and 1891. His younger brother, Davidson, also played for Queen's Park and was also a Scottish internationalist.
