= Bob Brown (footballer, born 1870) =

Scottish footballer

Personal information
- Full name: Robert Neilson Brown
- Date of birth: 19 August 1870
- Place of birth: Port Eglinton, Scotland
- Date of death: 17 August 1943 (aged 72)
- Place of death: Farnworth, England
- Positions: Inside forward; centre half

Senior career*
| Years | Team | Apps | (Gls) |
- Blantyre Thistle
| 1888–1891 | Cambuslang | 27 | (12) |
| 1891–1894 | The Wednesday | 45 | (8) |
| 1894–1895 | Third Lanark | 10 | (2) |
| 1895–1902 | Bolton Wanderers | 125 | (14) |
| 1897 | → Burnley (loan) | 4 | (1) |
| Total | | 211 | (37) |

International career
| 1890 | Scotland | 1 | (0) |
- * Club domestic league appearances and goals

Robert Neilson Brown (19 August 1870 – 17 August 1943), sometimes misidentified as J. Brown, was a Scottish footballer whose career included periods at Sheffield Wednesday and Bolton Wanderers.

== Club career ==
Brown was born in Port Eglinton in the south of Glasgow, but moved with his family to Halfway, a district of Cambuslang, during his childhood. He began his senior career as an at local club Cambuslang F.C. who were founder members of the Scottish Football League in 1890. He signed for The Wednesday before the club gained admission to the English Football League in 1892, making a name for himself when scoring in a 4–1 defeat of League side Bolton Wanderers in the FA Cup shortly after arriving in January of that year. He went on to make 45 appearances in Wednesday's first two League seasons and, after a brief spell back in his native Scotland with Third Lanark, he then joined Bolton Wanderers in 1895, moving to a more defensive role and latterly operating as a capable reserve in almost any outfield position as needed; he made 149 appearances at Burnden Park, 94 of them in the top flight. Brown also briefly had a loan spell at Burnley in 1897, making four appearances but was unable to save them from relegation. He retired in 1902 and settled in Lancashire.

== International career ==
While a teenager at Cambuslang, Brown was selected once for the Scotland national team against Wales in 1890. The following year he played for the Glasgow FA in their annual challenge match against Sheffield, and after moving to that city he featured in a 'Midlands v North' representative fixture.
