= John McCorkindale =

Scottish footballer

Personal information
- Date of birth: 1867
- Place of birth: Dalmuir, Scotland
- Date of death: 1953 (aged 85–86)
- Place of death: Clydebank, Scotland
- Position: Goalkeeper

Senior career*
Years	Team	Apps	(Gls)
- Partick
1888–1892	Partick Thistle		
1892–1894	Clyde	44	(0)

International career
1891	Scotland	1	(0)
- * Club domestic league appearances and goals

John McCorkindale (1867–1953) was a Scottish footballer who played as a goalkeeper.

== Career ==
McCorkindale played club football for Partick, Partick Thistle and Clyde, and made one appearance for Scotland in 1891, a 4–3 win over Wales. He was selected for the Glasgow FA's challenge matches which were common in the era, facing Edinburgh twice (both in 1890) and Sheffield in 1891.

He later became a referee.
