= Robert Scott (footballer, born 1870) =

Scottish footballer

Personal information
- Date of birth: 2 October 1870
- Place of birth: Airdrie, Scotland
- Position: Inside forward

Senior career*
Years	Team	Apps	(Gls)
1888–?	Airdrieonians	68	(46)
1893	→ Celtic (loan)	1	(0)

International career
1894	Scotland	1	(0)
- * Club domestic league appearances and goals

Robert Scott (born 2 October 1870, date of death unknown) was a professional footballer who played for Scotland against Ireland in the 1893–94 British Home Championship. Scott was born in Airdrie, North Lanarkshire.

== Career ==
Scott played for Airdrieonians for around ten years from 1888. During his time at the club, the "Diamonds" joined Division Two of the Scottish League in 1894. Scott also had a one-match loan to Celtic on 29 April 1893. Scott was appearing in place of Mick Mulvey, and helped Celtic secure a 3–0 victory over Rangers, which ultimately led Celtic to win their first league title. He suffered a broken leg just before the turn of the century which effectively ended his playing career.

Scott made one appearance for Scotland, a 2–1 victory over Ireland on 31 March 1894, during the 1893–94 British Home Championship.

== Playing style ==
Scott was noted for his "fierce low shots".

== Family ==
Scott's brother, Matthew Scott, also played for Airdrieonians and played for Scotland in 1898.
