= Davidson Berry =

Scottish footballer

Personal information
- Date of birth: 27 May 1875
- Place of birth: Cathcart, Scotland
- Date of death: 26 November 1952 (aged 77)
- Place of death: Shawlands, Scotland
- Positions: Inside left; outside left

Senior career*
Years	Team	Apps	(Gls)
1891–19??	Queen's Park		

International career
1894–1899	Scotland	3	(2)
- * Club domestic league appearances and goals

Davidson Berry (27 May 1875 – 26 November 1952) was a Scottish footballer who played for Queen's Park and the Scotland national team.

Berry, an inside left / outside left, joined Queen's Park as a teenager in 1891. Aged just 18, he won his first cap for Scotland in March 1894 and scored in a 5–2 win over Wales. He won two more caps in 1899, scoring against Ireland.

His elder brother William also played for Queen's Park and was also a Scotland internationalist.
