= Edwin James (footballer) =

Welsh footballer

Personal information
- Date of birth: 1869
- Place of birth: Wales

International career
Years	Team	Apps	(Gls)
1893–1899	Wales	8	(2)

Edwin James (born 1869) was a Welsh international footballer. He was part of the Wales national football team between 1893 and 1899, playing 8 matches and scoring 2 goals. He played his first match on 13 March 1893 against England and his last match on 4 March 1899 against Ireland.

== See also ==
- List of Wales international footballers (alphabetical)
