= Archibald Ritchie (footballer, born 1868) =

Scottish footballer (1868–1932)

Archie Ritchie
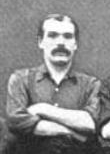
- With Nottingham Forest in 1894

Personal information
- Full name: Archibald Ritchie
- Date of birth: 21 October 1868
- Place of birth: Alloa, Scotland
- Date of death: 18 January 1932 (aged 63)
- Place of death: Nottingham, England
- Position: Defender

Senior career*
Years	Team	Apps	(Gls)
1891	East Stirlingshire		
1891-1899	Nottingham Forest (Note: Includes stats for Football Alliance for 1891–92.)	175	(0)
1899–1900	Bristol Rovers	22	(0)
1901–1902	Swindon Town	26	(0)

International career
1891	Scotland	1	(0)
- * Club domestic league appearances and goals

Archibald Ritchie (21 October 1868 – 18 January 1932) was a Scottish footballer who played as a defender for East Stirlingshire, Nottingham Forest, Bristol Rovers, Swindon Town and the Scotland national football team.

== Nottingham Forest ==
Ritchie made his debut for Nottingham Forest on 5 September 1891 in a 4–1 victory away to Bootle and his last competitive game was on 20 April 1899 at Derby County which Forest lost 2–0. He was part of the team that won the FA Cup in 1898.

== International career ==
Ritchie won one cap with the Scotland national team against Wales in the 1891 British Home Championship.

== Honours ==
Nottingham Forest

- Football Alliance 1892
- FA Cup winner: 1898

== See also ==
- List of Scotland international footballers (1–4 caps)
