= John Inglis (footballer, born 1857) =

Scottish footballer

Personal information
- Full name: John Inglis
- Date of birth: 15 September 1857
- Place of birth: Riccarton, Scotland
- Date of death: 30 October 1942 (aged 85)
- Place of death: Kilmarnock, Scotland
- Position: Goalkeeper

Senior career*
Years	Team	Apps	(Gls)
1878–1884	Kilmarnock Athletic		

International career
1884	Scotland	1	(0)
- * Club domestic league appearances and goals

John Inglis (15 September 1857 – 30 October 1942) was a Scottish footballer who played as a goalkeeper.

== Career ==
Inglis played club football for Kilmarnock Athletic (winning the Ayrshire Cup twice), and made one appearance for Scotland in 1884. He was the only serving player from Kilmarnock Athletic (not to be confused with Kilmarnock) to have been selected for international duty.
