= Thomas Chambers (footballer) =

Scottish footballer

Personal information
- Full name: Thomas Chambers
- Place of birth: Scotland
- Position: Inside forward

Senior career*
Years	Team	Apps	(Gls)
1892–1893	Burnley	16	(4)
1893–1896	Heart of Midlothian		
1896–1897	Burnley	10	(5)

International career
1894	Scotland	1	(1)
- * Club domestic league appearances and goals

Thomas Chambers was a Scottish international association footballer. He was awarded one cap for the Scotland national football team in 1894, but he was never selected again despite scoring on his début.

== International goals ==
#	Date	Venue	Opponent	Result	Competition	Scored
1	1894-03-24	Rugby Park, Kilmarnock	Wales	5–2	British Home Championship	1
