= William Fulton (1880s footballer) =

Scottish footballer

Personal information
- Date of death: 14 January 1941
- Position: Defender

Senior career*
Years	Team	Apps	(Gls)
- Abercorn

International career
1884	Scotland	1	(0)
- * Club domestic league appearances and goals

William Fulton (died 14 January 1941) was a Scottish footballer who played as a defender.

== Career ==
Fulton played club football for Abercorn, a club of which he was a co-founder. He also made one appearance for Scotland in 1884.

He later worked as a newsagent in Paisley.
