= James McKee (footballer) =

Scottish footballer

Personal information
- Date of birth: 18 March 1871
- Place of birth: Moira, Ireland
- Date of death: 12 May 1949 (aged 78)
- Place of death: Harthill, Scotland
- Position: Centre forward

Senior career*
Years	Team	Apps	(Gls)
- West Benhar Violet
- Dykehead
1895–1896	Heart of Midlothian	2	(1)
1896–1897	Darwen	8	(3)
1897–1900	East Stirlingshire		
1900–1903	Bolton Wanderers	81	(19)
1903–1904	Luton Town		
1904–1906	New Brompton		

International career
1898	Scotland	1	(2)
- * Club domestic league appearances and goals

James McKee (alternately McKie, 18 March 1871 – 12 May 1949) was a Scottish footballer who played as a centre-forward for Scotland and for various clubs in Scotland and England in the 1890s and 1900s.

== Football career ==
McKee started his football career with Heart of Midlothian before moving to England to spend one season at Darwen in 1896. He then returned to Scotland to join East Stirlingshire, and later went back to England to play for Bolton Wanderers, Luton Town and New Brompton.

His only Scotland cap came in Scotland's 5–2 win over Wales on 19 March 1898 when he scored two goals, with the others from fellow debutant, James Gillespie. Though largely raised in Shotts, McKee was born in County Down in Ireland which should have disqualified him (and England-born teammate William Watson) from being selected under the rules of the time.
