= East Stirlingshire F.C. =

Association football club in Scotland

East Stirlingshire
- Full name: East Stirlingshire Football Club
- Nickname: The Shire
- Founded: 1 October 1880; 146 years ago (as Bainsford Britannia)
- Ground: Ochilview, Falkirk
- Capacity: 3,746
- Coordinates: 56.028238°N 3.814663°W
- Chairman: Simon Dickerson
- Manager: Callum Tapping
- League: Lowland League East
- 2025–26: Lowland League, 18th of 18
- Website: eaststirlingshire.com
Home colours

East Stirlingshire Football Club is a Scottish association football club based in the town of Falkirk. The club was founded in 1881 and competes in the Lowland League East, the fifth tier of the Scottish football league system. The club's origins can be traced to 1880 when a local cricket club formed a football team under the name Bainsford Britannia.

The club was elected to the Scottish Football League in 1900–01 and has competed in the league system for most of its existence. East Stirlingshire has won the second tier of Scottish football once and finished runners-up once, earning promotion to the top-flight on both occasions. The club's highest league ranking came during the two solitary seasons it competed in the top flight in 1932–33 and 1963–64. In 2016, East Stirlingshire became the first club ever to be relegated out of the national league system.

East Stirlingshire first entered in the Scottish Cup in 1882, its best result reaching the quarter-finals on three occasions, the last in 1981. The club's best result in a national cup competition was in the 2000–01 season when it reached the semi-finals of the Scottish Challenge Cup, losing to Livingston for a place in the final. In 2008, the club left Firs Park and moved to Ochilview Park to ground-share with local rivals Stenhousemuir. In 2018 they moved to groundshare with Falkirk at Falkirk Stadium until returning to Ochilview for the 2025–26 season.

== History ==
East Stirlingshire's official date of formation was in 1881, but its origins can be traced to the previous year when a local cricket club called Bainsford Bluebonnets formed a football team under the name Britannia. The team's first recorded match was a friendly against Falkirk's second eleven in December 1880 and resulted in a 7–0 defeat while its first match as East Stirlingshire was against the same opponent in August 1881. The club's nickname is "The Shire", which refers to the Stirlingshire part of the club name. After joining the Scottish Football Association, the club became eligible to compete in the Scottish Cup, Scotland's main association football knock-out competition, eliminated in its first game in 1882. In December 1883, the Stirlingshire Football Association was founded, with membership open to clubs exclusively from the county of Stirlingshire. It resulted in the establishment of a new regional tournament called the Stirlingshire Cup, with the club reaching the final in its first season. East Stirlingshire dominated the tournament in its early years, winning it for a record four consecutive seasons 91885 and 18890, including an emphatic 9–0 victory against Falkirk in the 1888 final. Two goals came from Lawrence McLachlan who was an influential goalscorer in the club's early successes; scoring more times than any other East Stirlingshire player with 135 known goals.

East Stirlingshire squad in 1891 with several trophies won by the club including the Stirlingshire Cup.

The latter years of the 19th century was East Stirlingshire's most successful era in the Scottish Cup. In the 1888–89 and 1890–91 tournaments, the club reached the quarter-finals in what was to be the last time for 91 years, losing to Celtic and Hearts respectively. In the 1888–89 tournament, the club recorded its highest win and equalled it in successive rounds with a 10–1 victory against local rivals Stenhousemuir in the first round and an 11–2 win over Vale of Bannock in the second round. It was during this period that four East Stirlingshire players earned international caps for their countries. The first was the Wales national team captain, Humphrey Jones, who earned five caps whilst with the club. Three other players, David Alexander, Archibald Ritchie, and James McKee made appearances for the Scotland national team from 1891 to 1898.

Between 1891 and 1899, the club competed in regional leagues, including winning the Midland Football League and Central Football Combination, before being elected to the second tier of Scotland's main national league competition – the Scottish Football League – in 1900–01, ending its first season ranked 7th from ten. In March 1905, a proposal was raised for the club to merge with neighbours Falkirk with an aim to creating a bigger and more financially stable club, which Falkirk accepted in a vote. However, East Stirlingshire's vote was not in favour and the club rejected the proposal. The years following included finishing bottom of the league in 1905–06, recording only one win from 22 games, contrasting with finishing as high as third in table in 1912–13, narrowly missing out on winning the championship by two points. The club remained in Division Two until 1914–15 when it, and the Scottish Cup, were both suspended due to World War I.

Chart showing the progress of East Stirlingshire F.C. through the Scottish football league system from 1900–01 to 2011–12

At the end of World War I, the club was re-elected to the old Division Two which was re-established in the 1921–22 season. The year beforehand saw the club move to Firs Park after leaving their old ground of Merchiston Park in 1920. In the same year, a record home attendance of 12,000 was set when the club played eventual champions, Partick Thistle, in the Scottish Cup in February 1921. The club was relegated to the newly created, but short lived, Division Three in 1922–23, earning promotion back to Division Two after one season; setting a record of 23 home games without a loss. A decade later, East Stirlingshire won promotion to Division One, Scotland's top flight, for the first time. En route to promotion, the club spent 32 weeks at the top of Division Two, ending the season equal on 55 points with St Johnstone, with East Stirlingshire winning the championship on a superior goal average. East Stirlingshire spent one season in its first spell in the top flight, ending the year bottom of the league in 20th with seventeen points. Back in Division Two in the 1935–36 season, the club's heaviest league defeat of 12–1 was inflicted by Dundee United in April 1936. In 1938–39, the final season before the league was suspended due to World War II, East Stirlingshire finished second-bottom of the league, ahead of only Edinburgh City, but despite finishing low, Malcolm Morrison became the club's highest league goalscorer in a single season with 36 goals.

The club was excluded from a wartime league in 1939 and was also denied re-entry to the Scottish Football League Division Two at the end of World War II, along with six other small league clubs. As a result, the clubs competed in a newly created Division C along with the reserve teams of some of Scotland's top clubs. In the second season in Division C, East Stirlingshire won the league and was promoted back to Division Two, now renamed "Division B", but finished last after one season in 1948–49, and were relegated back to the "C Division".

After another six seasons competing in "Division C" the club rejoined Division Two in 1955–56 when the " C Division" was abolished and the number of teams in the Scottish Football League was expanded. The club sold many young players to larger clubs, including defender Eddie McCreadie to Chelsea in 1962 who earned 23 international caps for Scotland and is tenth in Chelsea's all-time appearance list with 410. The money earned from the transfer helped attract new players and in the 1962–63 season, the club won promotion to the top flight for a second time, as runners-up in Division Two behind St Johnstone. Like the previous occasion in 1932–33, East Stirlingshire spent one solitary season in the top tier before being relegated.

After relegation from Scotland's top flight, East Stirlingshire was controversially merged with Clydebank Juniors in 1964. The new club was renamed East Stirlingshire Clydebank – often E.S. Clydebank for short – and relocated to Kilbowie Park in Clydebank against fans' wishes. However, the merge lasted only one season, with East Stirlingshire shareholders winning several court cases against it and thus the club reverted to its original legal status and moved back to Falkirk. During the single season as E.S. Clydebank, the club set a record attendance at Kilbowie Park when 14,900 spectators attended a Scottish Cup first round replay against Hibernian in February 1965.

In 1966, Lawrence Binnie became the club's first official manager, prior to his appointment the board of directors took responsibility for management roles. After de-merging with Clydebank Juniors, the club spent ten seasons in Division Two before being moved by league reconstruction to a new Second Division for the 1975–76 season, now the third tier with the creation of the Premier Division at the top of the Scottish Football League. During this period, the club progressed past the group stage of Scottish League Cup for the first time since it was inaugurated in 1947. The year beforehand saw the club appoint its most famous manager, Alex Ferguson, who was at the club during 1974 before moving to St Mirren. In 1979–80, East Stirlingshire won promotion to the First Division, which is the last time the club was promoted in the league. Managed by Billy Lamont, the club finished runners-up by one point to rivals Falkirk in the Second Division. The clubs shared the top two spots in the league for most of the season and entered the final match equal on points, with East Stirlingshire required to better Falkirk's result to win the championship due to an inferior goal difference. However, Falkirk won its match and East Stirlingshire drew and so finished second.

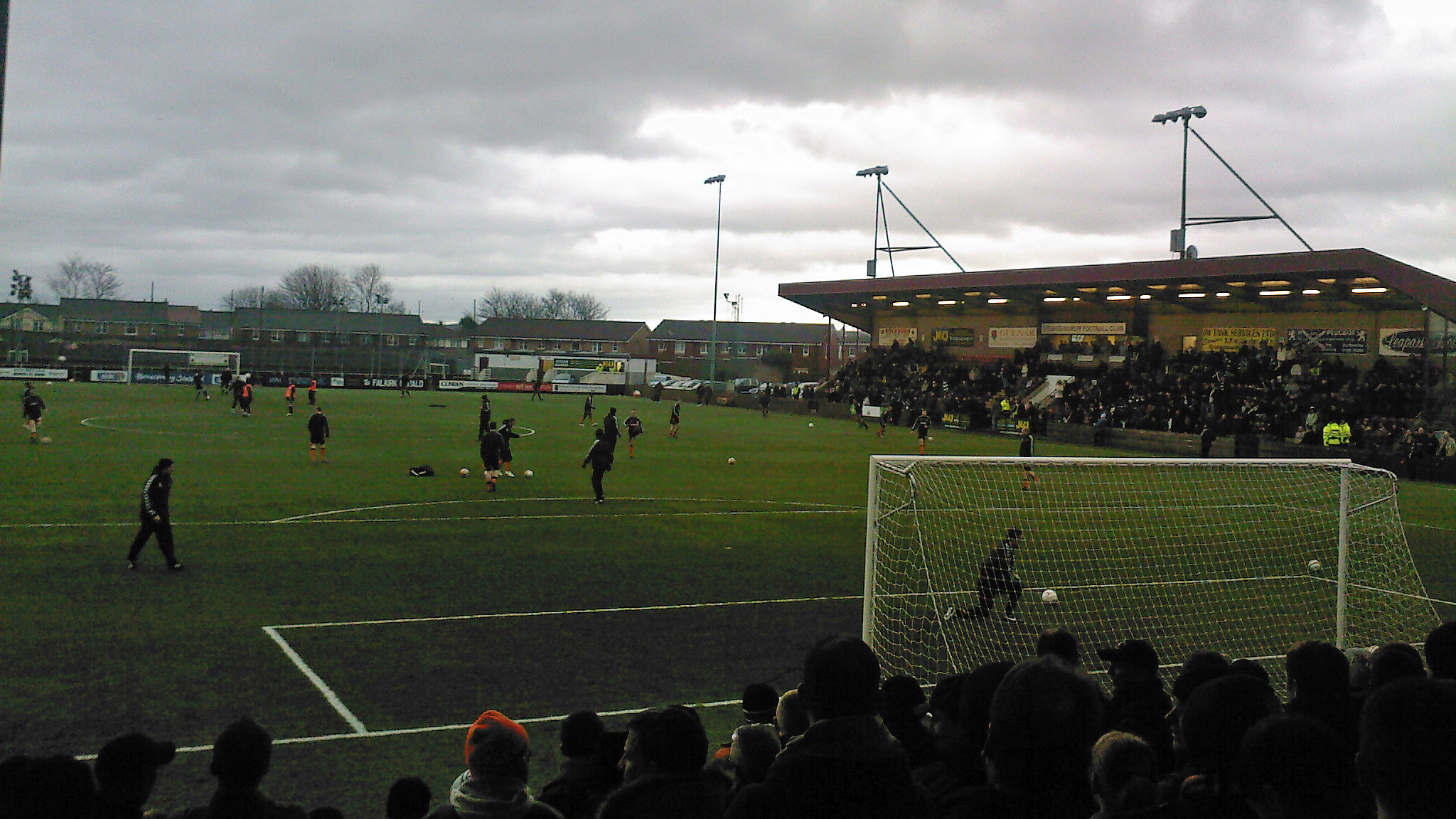
Warm up before a Scottish Cup match between East Stirlingshire and Dundee United at Ochilview Park in 2009

In the 1994–95 season, the Scottish Football League was again restructured and East Stirlingshire was moved to a new Third Division, now the fourth-tier. The club finished its first season in the Third Division ranked fourth from ten and repeated it again in 1997–98. With these exceptions East Stirlingshire generally finished below mid-table, including a final day victory against Arbroath in the 1996–97 season to avoid finishing last. In 2000–01, the club reached the semi-final of a national cup competition for the first time in its history, losing 2–1 to Livingston for a place in the final of the Scottish Challenge Cup.

At the start of the 21st century the club struggled financially, paying players £10-a-week and manager Dennis Newall became the first unpaid manager at senior level in Scottish football. As a result, the club ranked last in the Scottish Football League for five consecutive seasons from 2002–03 to 2006–07, losing 24 consecutive league games in the 2003–04 season, recording only 8 points from two wins and two draws in 36 games. From the 2005–06 season, it was determined if a club finished bottom of the Third Division twice in successive years, it would face the risk of being reduced to associate member status, meaning the loss of voting rights. In East Stirlingshire's case, a league vote was held and concluded in favour of the club retaining full member status with the condition that it did not finish last the following season in 2008. The club won its final game of the season to move off the bottom of the table in a 3–1 win against Montrose, which was also the last game at Firs Park. The following season, retaining full member status, the club moved to Ochilview Park in a ground-share agreement with neighbours Stenhousemuir.

Under manager Jim McInally, the club finished third in successive years to qualify for the promotion play-offs to the Second Division. However, a second-bottom place finish in the 2010–11 season saw McInally sacked and replaced by John Coughlin. The club would subsequently post another two bottom-place finishes in the seasons to follow, which could have again put them in danger of reduction to associate member status, but due to ongoing negotiations about league restructuring for the 2013–14 season, the league opted not to enforce the rule. The negotiations ultimately saw the formation of a new governing body, the Scottish Professional Football League, following the merger of the Scottish Football League and Scottish Premier League. East Stirlingshire joined the Scottish League Two, the successor to the old Third Division. In October 2015, on loan Raith Rovers forward Jonny Court scored the SPFL's 5000th goal (across all four divisions, but not including play-offs), in a 2–0 home win over Elgin City. Having finished bottom of 2015–16 Scottish League Two, East Stirlingshire faced a play-off against Edinburgh City for a place in 2016–17 Scottish League Two. Edinburgh City won 2–1 on aggregate, relegating East Stirlingshire to the Lowland League and ending their 61-year tenure in the Scottish national league set-up.

== Colours and crest ==
Black and white hoops from 1882

East Stirlingshire's home colours have been black and white hoops for most of its existence since 1882. The club's first strip was thin blue and white hoops between 1880 and 1882, before changing to colours similar to the present day. An all-black shirt was introduced between 1960 and 1962, and again between 2008 and 2010, while the club's centenary strip in 1981 was all-white. In 1996–97, the stripes were changed from horizontal to vertical for a full season; a similar design featured for one month in August 1982 before changing back.

The first company to supply kits for East Stirlingshire was Bukta between 1979 and 1987. For the 1998–99 season, the club signed a deal with French kit supplier Le Coq Sportif who failed to deliver the kits in time for the start of the season so sent a set of Queen's Park strips with East Stirlingshire's crest and sponsors ironed on top of the original. The supplier for the 2012–13 season is Jako. Past suppliers include Hummel, Umbro and Joma.

The club crest is a shield with black and white stripes and a stylised football, with a banner displaying the club name at the top. It has several variations with the football and banner coloured black, white or orange in different versions.

=== Sponsorship and manufacturers ===
Period	Kit manufacturer	Shirt sponsor
1979–1987	(England) Bukta	none
1983–1987	(England) Bukta	Sunlife of Canada
1987–1988	(Japan) Matsudo	Lynben Ltd
1988–1999	(Iceland) Henson	Lynben Ltd
1990–1991	(England) Spall	none
1991–1992	(England) Umbro	GJ Sports
1992–1993	(England) Ellgren	Reebok
1993–1994	Alpa Sportswear	Greenaway of Falkirk
1994–1995	Ideal Sports	Central FM
1995–1996	Ideal Sports	J.G. Kelly Watchmaker
1996–1997	(England) Prostar	Angus Williamson Therapy Clinic
1997–1998	(England) Prostar	J. Rae & Son
1998–1999	(France) Le Coq Sportif	Richmond Park Hotel
1999–2000	(France) Le Coq Sportif	Euro Environmental Contracts Ltd
2000–2004	Secca	Finewood
2004–2005	(England) Prostar	McFadden's Timber
2005–2006	(England) Prostar	Littlewoods Football Pools
2006–2007	(England) Prostar	SX Records
2007–2008	(Spain) Joma	Northern Blue Ltd
2008–2009	(Denmark) Hummel	Chicago Shire Supporters
2009–2010	(Denmark) Hummel	Eas-Sup Shire
2010–2011	(England) Prostar	Foxlane Garden Centre
2011–2013	(Germany) Jako	Foxlane Garden Centre
2013–2014	(Germany) Jako	Larbert Mortgage Centre
2014–2015	(Germany) Jako	LK Galaxy Sports
2015–2016	(Germany) Jako	AiiB Consulting
2016–2017	(Spain) Joma	Ladbrokes
2017–2019	(Spain) Joma	Independent Asbestos (Home); AiiB Consulting (Away)
2019–2020	(England) EV2 Sportswear	Central Industrial Services (Home)
2020–	(England) EV2 Sportswear	EV2SPORTSWEAR.COM

== Grounds ==
East Stirlingshire has played at several grounds over its history. In the club's early existence as Britannia, it played one of its first known matches at Burnhouse against a Falkirk 2nd XI, which ended in a 7–0 defeat for the team. Burnhouse is thought to be the location that was to become Merchiston Park, where the club played many of its matches in the late 19th century. Some home matches were also played at Randyford Park in the town.

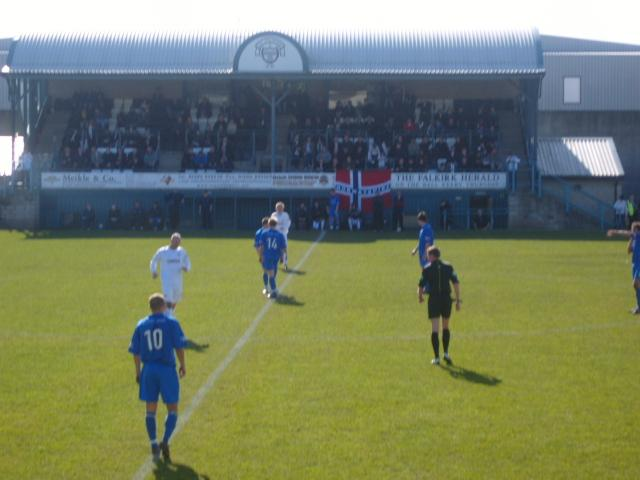
Firs Park's final match, showing the main stand in the background

Merchiston Park was a football ground located in the village of Bainsford, approximately 1 mile (1.6 km) north of Falkirk. It was situated on the northern bank of the Forth and Clyde Canal near to present day Main Street in Bainsford. The ground hosted East Stirlingshire's first Scottish Football League match in 1900–01 which ended in a 3–2 defeat to Airdrieonians. Merchiston Park remained the club's home until 1921 when a nearby iron works acquired the ground for expansion and the club moved to Firs Park.

Firs Park was located to the south of the canal in the centre of Falkirk, named after the street in which it was situated, Firs Street. The club moved to the ground in 1921 and in the same year, the club's record attendance was set at a Scottish Cup match against Partick Thistle when 12,000 spectators attended. Firs Park was East Stirlingshire's home for 87 years, except a solitary season in 1964 when the club played at Kilbowie Park in Clydebank after being controversially merged with Clydebank Juniors. As a result of the merger, Firs Park was closed, however, after only one season, the merger was disbanded and East Stirlingshire moved back to the ground, where it remained until the end of the 2007–08 season. The decision was taken by the club to close Firs Park due to the prohibitive costs of potential refurbishing to meet new Scottish Football Association stadium criteria. At the time of closure, the ground had a capacity of 1,800 with 200 seated in the main stand.

After leaving Firs Park in 2008 they played their home matches at Ochilview Park the home of local rivals Stenhousemuir; the club entered a groundshare agreement with Stenhousemuir, originally intended to be for a period of five years, during which the club planned to develop a new stadium in Falkirk.

Since the summer of 2018, East Stirlingshire have been playing their home matches at Falkirk Stadium which is the home ground of local rivals Falkirk. In May 2014, the club entered into a partnership with LK Galaxy Sports and others to develop a new playing facility at the former BP Club site at Little Kerse, between Grangemouth and Polmont. The site would also host other sports in due course. Planning was approved by Falkirk Council, but did not proceed at the time due to a lack of funds. The club trained at Little Kerse until the 2018 switch to the Falkirk Stadium, when all operations were moved to that venue.

== Rivalries ==
East Stirlingshire's traditional rival is Falkirk. The club's first match known as both Britannia and East Stirlingshire were friendly games against Falkirk in 1880 and 1881. Both clubs are based in Falkirk and have competed against each other in competitions such as Stirlingshire Cup since the late 19th century. East Stirlingshire was elected to the bottom tier of the Scottish Football League in 1900, closely followed by Falkirk two seasons later in 1902–03. The first competitive league meeting between the clubs ended in a 2–0 win for Falkirk at Merchiston Park in August 1902. The two clubs' old grounds of Firs Park and Brockville Park were geographically close, separated by less than half a mile (0.8 km).

On a regional scale, East Stirlingshire has rivalries with football clubs from the historical county of Stirlingshire, who have competed in the Stirlingshire Cup against each other since the early 1880s such as Stenhousemuir and since 1945, Stirling Albion and Alloa Athletic. East Stirlingshire played its home matches in a ground-share agreement with rivals Stenhousemuir at their Ochilview Park home until 2018.

== Current squad ==
As of 28 July 2026 Note: Flags indicate national team as defined under FIFA eligibility rules; some limited exceptions apply. Players may hold more than one non-FIFA nationality.

No.	Pos.	Nation	Player
—	GK	SCO	Dean Wilson
—	GK	SCO	Jay Cantley
—	GK	SCO	Joe Hastings (co-operation loan from Falkirk)
—	GK	SCO	Ruaridh MacDonald
—	DF	SCO	Alex Walker
—	DF	SCO	Alex Webb
—	DF	SCO	Blair Sneddon
—	DF	SCO	Harley Ewen
—	DF	SCO	Kyle Ewing
—	DF	SCO	Tony Coutts (Captain)
—	DF	SCO	Ryan McLean
—	DF	SCO	Oliver Simpson (on-loan from Stenhousemuir)
—	DF	SCO	Stephen Nixon (co-operation loan from Falkirk)
—	MF	SCO	Adam MacDonald
—	MF	SCO	Chris Ogilvie
—	MF	SCO	Kai Wilson

No.	Pos.	Nation	Player
—	MF	SCO	Kalvin Bennett (co-operation loan from Falkirk)
—	MF	SCO	Stephen O'Neill (Vice-captain)
—	MF	SCO	Jay Tapping
—	MF	SCO	Ryan Duncan
—	MF	SCO	Ryan Stevenson
—	FW	SCO	Ben Lamont
—	FW	SCO	Finlay Malcolm
—	FW	SCO	Kai Brown (co-operation loan from Falkirk)
—	FW	SCO	Matty Flynn
—	FW	SCO	Michael Weir
—	FW	SCO	Lewis Harrison (On-loan from East Kilbride)
—	FW	SCO	Sonny Aluko

== Coaching staff ==
As of 21 June 2025

Position	Name
Manager	Callum Tapping
Assistant manager	Matty Flynn
Assistant manager	Martin Mooney
Goalkeeping coach	Jamie Stephen
Sports scientist	Calum Dignan
Club physiotherapist	Jacob Silverston
Kit Managers	Tom & Gregor Muirhead

== Notable players ==
Gordon Russell holds the record for the most number of Scottish Football League appearances for East Stirlingshire with 415 between 1983 and 2002. He also went on to become the manager of the club for a short period in 2002.

East Stirlingshire players have been capped for their country at full international level 9 times by four players. The first person to do so was Humphrey Jones, who captained the Wales national team four times out of the five caps he earned whilst at East Stirlingshire. His first came in a British Home Championship match against England in 1889. The three other players to make an appearance for their country are Archibald Ritchie, David Alexander and James McKee, all for the Scotland national team at the British Championship. Each of them made their début against Wales, although in different seasons. Archibald Ritchie's one and only Scotland cap came in March 1891 against Wales, who were captained by former East Stirlingshire player Humphrey Jones. David Alexander made two appearances, one against Ireland and scoring against Wales at the 1894 British Home Championship which Scotland won. James McKee scored twice during his only appearance for Scotland, in a 5–2 victory over Wales in 1898. He is the last East Stirlingshire player to be capped by his country. Murray Brown was a steadfast defender during the late 90s having performed to a high standard at West Bromwich Albion during his teenage years.

== Notable managers ==
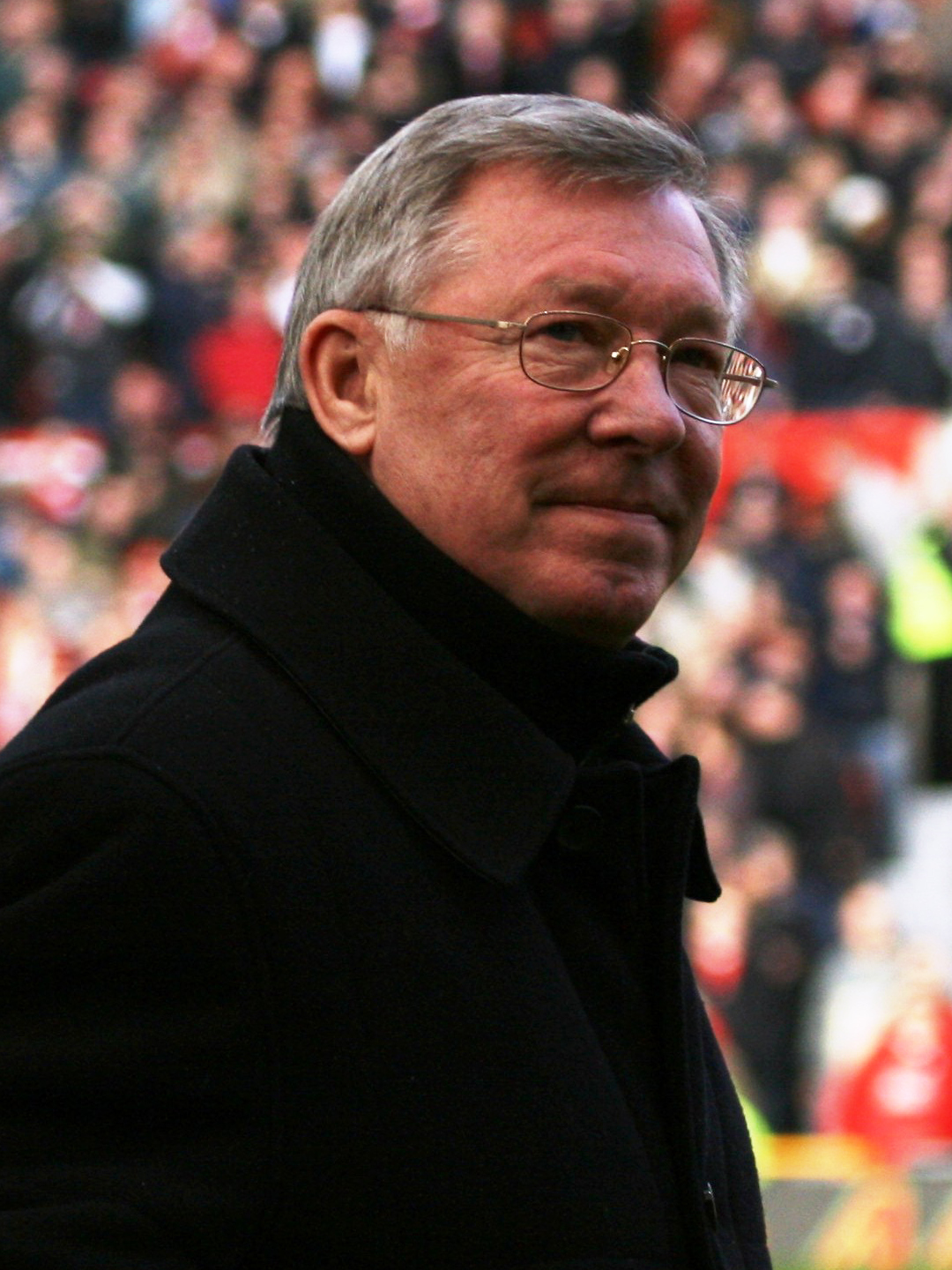
Alex Ferguson's first managerial role was at East Stirlingshire in 1974.

East Stirlingshire did not officially appoint a manager until 1966. Before then, all management decisions were taken by the board of directors at the club. The first person to manage the club was Lawrence Binnie in 1966. The club's most famous manager is former Manchester United manager, Sir Alex Ferguson, who in his first position as manager, stayed at East Stirlingshire during 1974 before moving to St Mirren.

No manager has won a league title with the club, however, Billy Lamont managed East Stirlingshire to promotion to the 1980–81 Scottish First Division after finishing runners-up in Division Two, one point behind rivals Falkirk. He also took East Stirlingshire to the quarter-finals of the Scottish Cup, the furthest stage of the tournament the club has reached since reaching the same stage 91 years beforehand in 1889–90.

After five consecutive seasons finishing bottom of the Scottish Football League in the mid-2000s, Jim McInally also changed fortunes at the club, managing East Stirlingshire to successive third-place finishes in the Third Division between 2008 and 2010 to qualify for the promotion play-offs.

== Honours ==
League

- Division Two (before 1975) and First Division (after 1975):
  - Winners (1): 1931–32
  - Runners-up (1): 1962–63
- Division Three (1923 to 1926), Division C (1946 to 1949) and Second Division (after 1975):
  - Winners (1): 1947–48
  - Runners-up (2): 1923–24, 1979–80

Cup

- Scottish Qualifying Cup:
  - Winners (2): 1888–89, 1910–11
  - Runners-up (3): 1895–96, 1897–98, 1900–01
- Scottish Qualifying Cup Midlands:
  - Runners-up (2): 1946–47, 1947–48
- Lowland League Cup
  - Runners-up: 2018–19
Other minor honours

League

- Midland Football League:
  - Winners (1): 1893–94
- Central Football Combination:
  - Winners (1): 1897–98
  - Runners-up (1): 1898–99
- Falkirk District Football League:
  - Winners (1): 1888–99
  - Runners-up (1): 1899–1900

Cup

- Stirlingshire Cup:
  - Winners (21): 1885–86 1886–87, 1887–88, 1888–89, 1890–91, 1892–93, 1893–94, 1896–97, 1900–01, 1902–03, 1906–07, 1913–14, 1923–24, 1927–28, 1928–29, 1931–32, 1935–36, 1961–62, 1968–69, 1984–85, 2000–01
  - Runners-up (16): 1883–84, 1903–04, 1904–05, 1907–08, 1919–20, 1924–25, 1933–34, 1952–53, 1970–71, 1972–73, 1975–76, 1990–91, 1995–96, 1998–99, 2003–04, 2005–06
- Dewar Shield:
  - Winners (1): 1929–30
  - Runners-up (2): 1900–01, 1949–50
- Falkirk and District Charity Cup:
  - Winners (6): 1884–85, 1885–86, 1886–87, 1887–88, 1890–91, 1895–96
  - Runners-up (4): 1888–89, 1889–90, 1891–92, 1913–14
- Falkirk Infirmary Shield (known as Falkirk Cottage Hospitals Shield from 1889 to 1905):
  - Winners (9): 1889–90, 1890–91, 1898–99, 1899–1900, 1903–04, 1924–25, 1926–27, 1928–29, 1931–32
  - Runners-up (16): 1891–92, 1892–93, 1893–94, 1896–97, 1901–02, 1904–05, 1911–12, 1913–14, 1915–16, 1916–17, 1920–21, 1921–22, 1923–24, 1929–30, 1935–36, 1936–37
- Victory Qualifying Cup (preliminary competition):
  - Winners (1): 1945–46
- Stirlingshire Coronation Tournament:
  - Winners (1): 1902–03

== Records and statistics ==
Chart showing East Stirlingshire's average home league attendance from 1900 to 2012

The club's record Scottish Football League victory is 8–0 against Arthurlie in August 1927 in Division Two and its record defeat is 12–1 to Dundee United in April 1936 in the same division. In the Scottish Cup, the club's record winning margin is 9 goals which it achieved in consecutive rounds of the 1888–89 Scottish Cup tournament: 10–1 against Stenhousemuir in the first round on 1 September 1888 and 11–2 against Vale of Bannock in the second round on 22 September 1888. In only its second season of competing in the cup, East Stirlingshire recorded its greatest loss: 2–10 to Renton in October 1884.

East Stirlingshire's record home attendance is 12,000 for a third round Scottish Cup match against Partick Thistle on 19 February 1921 at Firs Park. (Note: During the solitary season that East Stirlingshire was merged with Clydebank Juniors, a crowd of 14,900 attended a Scottish Cup game against Hibernian at Kilbowie Park on 10 February 1965; a record for the ground.)

Gordon Russell holds the record for East Stirlingshire league appearances, playing 445 first-team matches between 1983–84 and 2000–01. The record for most league goals in a single season is 41 by Andy Rodgers in the 2016–17 Lowland Football League. Humphrey Jones holds the record number of international caps earned as an East Stirlingshire player with 5 for the Wales national football team between 1889 and 1890.

The highest transfer fee received for an East Stirlingshire player is £35,000 from English club Chelsea for Jim Docherty in 1978, while the most paid by the club is the compensation development fee paid to Spartans for Jamie Dishington. The amount was higher than the previous record, £6,000 for the transfer of Colin McKinnon from Falkirk in 1991.
