= Thomas Turner (footballer) =

Scottish footballer

Personal information
- Position: Goalkeeper

Senior career*
Years	Team	Apps	(Gls)
- Arthurlie

International career
1884	Scotland	1	(0)
- * Club domestic league appearances and goals

Thomas Turner was a Scottish footballer who played as a goalkeeper.

== Career ==
Turner played club football for Arthurlie, and made one appearance for Scotland in 1884. He was later active as a referee, before emigrating to Australia.
