= David Alexander (footballer) =

Scottish footballer

Personal information
- Full name: David Alexander
- Date of birth: 22 April 1869
- Place of birth: Cambusnethan, Scotland
- Date of death: 14 January 1941 (aged 71)
- Place of death: Glasgow, Scotland
- Position: Centre forward

Senior career*
Years	Team	Apps	(Gls)
- East Stirlingshire
1891–1892	Darwen	21	(9)
1892–1893	Accrington	6	(1)
- East Stirlingshire

International career
1894	Scotland	2	(1)
- * Club domestic league appearances and goals

David Alexander (22 April 1869 – 14 January 1941) was a Scottish footballer, who played for East Stirlingshire, Darwen, Accrington and Scotland.
