= John Goudie =

Scottish footballer

Personal information
- Date of birth: 5 July 1857
- Place of birth: Paisley, Scotland
- Date of death: 23 April 1921 (aged 63)
- Position: Centre forward

Senior career*
| Years | Team | Apps | (Gls) |
- Abercorn
- Rangers
- Kilmarnock

International career
| 1884 | Scotland | 1 | (1) |
- * Club domestic league appearances and goals

John Goudie (5 July 1857 – 23 April 1921) was a Scottish footballer who played as a centre forward.

== Career ==
Born in Paisley, Goudie played club football for Abercorn, Rangers and Kilmarnock, and scored on his only appearance for Scotland in 1884.
