= John Macaulay (footballer) =

Scottish footballer

Personal information
- Position: Forward

Senior career*
Years	Team	Apps	(Gls)
- Arthurlie

International career
1884	Scotland	1	(0)
- * Club domestic league appearances and goals

John Macaulay was a Scottish footballer who played as a forward.

== Career ==
Macaulay played club football for Arthurlie, and made one appearance for Scotland in 1884.
