= John Johnstone (footballer, born 1869) =

Scottish footballer

Personal information
- Date of birth: 23 January 1869
- Place of birth: Riccarton, Scotland
- Date of death: 6 February 1953 (aged 84)
- Place of death: Kilmarnock, Scotland
- Position: Left half

Senior career*
Years	Team	Apps	(Gls)
–	Riccarton Victoria		
1890–1901	Kilmarnock	82	(3)

International career
1894	Scotland	1	(1)
- * Club domestic league appearances and goals

John Johnstone (23 January 1869 – 6 February 1953) was a Scottish footballer who played as a left half for Kilmarnock and Scotland. He played in the 1898 Scottish Cup Final which Kilmarnock lost to Rangers, and was a winner of Scottish Division Two in the same season and again in 1898–99 (they were elected for promotion on the second occasion).
