= 1874–75 Queen's Park F.C. season =

Queen's Park
1874–75 season
- Stadium: Hampden Park
- Scottish Cup: Winners
Home colours

The 1874–75 season was the fourth season of competitive football by Queen's Park.

This was the second season in which Queen's Park played in their now traditional black and white hoops. Between 1874 and 1876, each player wore distinctive socks.

== Scottish Cup ==
Queen's Park retained the Scottish Cup, winning the competition for the second time after they defeated Renton in the final.

Date	Round	Opponents	H / A	Result F–A	Scorers	Attendance
24 October 1874	First round	Western	A	1–0	Thomson	
21 November 1874	Second round	West End	H	7–0	Unknown	
December 1874	Quarter-final	Rovers	w/o			
20 March 1875	Semi-final	Clydesdale	A	0–0		
27 March 1875	Semi-final replay	Clydesdale	H	2–2	Highet, B. MacKinnon	
3 April 1875	Semi-final second replay	Clydesdale	A	1–0	Own goal	
10 April 1875	Final	Renton	H	3–0	A. MacKinnon 55', Highet 70', B. MacKinnon 75'	7,000

== Friendlies ==
Date	Opponents	H / A	Result F–A	Scorers	Attendance
30 January 1875	(England) Notts County	H	6–0	H. McNeil (2), B. MacKinnon, Weir (2), Spencer (o.g.)	4,500
8 March 1875	(England) Notts County	A	1–1		

== Squad statistics ==
Name	Scottish Cup	
Name	Apps	Goals
Robert W. Neill	6	0
Joseph Taylor	6	0
James Phillips	6	0
James J. Thomson	1	1
Charles Campbell	6	0
Jerry Weir	5	0
Billy MacKinnon	6	2
Angus MacKinnon	6	1
Henry McNeil	6	0
Thomas Highet	5	2
T. Lawrie	6	0
J. Dickson	5	0
R. Rae	1	0
Robert Leckie	1	0
