= List of Queen's Park F.C. seasons =

This is a list of Queen's Park Football Club seasons up to the present day. The list details Queen's Park's record in major league and cup competitions, and the club's top league goal scorer of each season. Top scorers in bold were also the top scorers in Queen's Park's division that season. Records of regular minor competitions such as the Glasgow Cup are only included for seasons where the club reached a final.

== Summary ==
Chart of yearly table positions of Queen's Park in the Scottish league system.

Queen's Park is the oldest football club in Scotland, founded in 1867. They were the nation's earliest dominant force, winning 10 Scottish Cups over the competition's first two decades, providing many players to the Scotland national football team (including all 11 players for the first official international match in 1872) and also playing in the English FA Cup final on two occasions in the 1880s when Scottish teams were permitted to enter. Determined to maintain an amateur ethos at the club, they declined to participate in the Scottish Football League when it launched in 1890, eventually joining ten years later – by which time professionalism had been adopted and standards raised among their competitors, most prominently Glasgow rivals Celtic and Rangers who soon began to eclipse the Spiders' success and popularity. Despite their diminishing status, in an ambitious 1903 project the club constructed the world's largest stadium, Hampden Park (their third home ground bearing that name) which became the national stadium for cup finals and Scotland fixtures, though still proudly owned by the amateurs.

Although no longer making an impact on the Scottish Cup and consistently among the lower-ranked sides in Division One (any successful period would usually result in all the best players quickly being signed by professional clubs, with no financial incentive to entice them to stay meaning there was never much chance to build and maintain a strong squad), with the exception of one year Queen's Park still maintained their top level status until after World War II, but after a relegation in 1948 they only returned to the elite group for two more seasons in the 1950s, and then fell towards the bottom of the lower tier, dropping into a third division when it was introduced in the 1970s and a fourth division in the 1990s, remaining there since and playing home matches at a modernised, near-empty Hampden Park.

With relegation out of the Scottish Professional Football League system having been introduced, in 2019 the club's members voted to turn professional in an effort to pull away from the lowest reaches of the setup and maintain greater control over the young players they trained, who had previously been allowed to move on for nothing. They also sold Hampden to the Scottish Football Association, using the funds to upgrade the adjacent training ground Lesser Hampden to become their regular match venue from 2021, having already built a new club pavilion there seven years earlier. The effects of the change were swift: with successive promotions from the fourth tier to the second in 2021 and 2022 were almost followed by another into the Scottish Premiership, but the team finished a few points off the automatic place and then lost quickly in the play-offs; there was less stability off-field in that period, with frequent changes of head coach and revisions and delays in development at Lesser Hampden, requiring ground-shares and the rental of Hampden for home fixtures.

== Seasons ==
Key

Champions	Runners-up	3rd / Semi-final	Promoted	Relegated

Season	League											Scottish Cup	League Cup	Other	Manager	Top league scorer(s)	
Season	League	Div	Pld	W	D	L	GF	GA	GD	Pts	Pos	Scottish Cup	League Cup	Other	Manager	Name	Goals
1871–72	N/A (Note: the Scottish Football League was established in 1890.)											N/A (Note: the Scottish Cup was established in 1873.)	N/A (Note: the Scottish League Cup was established in 1946.)	FA Cup Semi-final	-	N/A	
1872–73	N/A											N/A	N/A	FA Cup Semi-final	-	N/A	
1873–74	N/A											Winners	N/A	N/A	-	N/A	
1874–75	N/A											Winners	N/A	N/A	-	N/A	
1875–76	N/A											Winners	N/A	N/A	-	N/A	
1876–77	N/A											Quarter-final	N/A	FA Cup Quarter-final Charity Cup Winners	-	N/A	
1877–78	N/A											Third round	N/A	FA Cup Second round Charity Cup Winners	-	N/A	
1878–79	N/A											Quarter-final	N/A	N/A	-	N/A	
1879–80	N/A											Winners	N/A	FA Cup First round Charity Cup Winners	-	N/A	
1880–81	N/A											Winners	N/A	FA Cup First round Charity Cup Winners	-	N/A	
1881–82	N/A											Winners	N/A	FA Cup First round	-	N/A	
1882–83 (Note: Last season playing home matches at first Hampden Park.)	N/A											Quarter-final	N/A	FA Cup; First round Charity Cup Winners	-	N/A	
1883–84 (Note: Home matches played at Titwood, Glasgow.)	N/A											Winners	N/A	FA Cup Runners-up Charity Cup Winners	-	N/A	
1884–85 (Note: First season playing home matches at second Hampden Park.)	N/A											Third round	N/A	FA Cup Runners-up Charity Cup Winners	-	N/A	
1885–86	N/A											Winners	N/A	FA Cup Second round	-	N/A	
1886–87	N/A											Semi-final	N/A	FA Cup First round	-	N/A	
1887–88	N/A											Semi-final	N/A	N/A	-	N/A	
1888–89	N/A											Third round	N/A	Glasgow Cup Winners Charity Cup Runners-up	-	N/A	
1889–90	N/A											Winners	N/A	Glasgow Cup Winners Charity Cup Runners-up	-	N/A	
1890–91	Did not enter (Note: The Scottish Football League began in 1890, but Queen's Park declined to enter until 1900.)											Quarter-final	N/A	Charity Cup Winners	-	N/A	
1891–92	Did not enter											Runners-up	N/A	N/A	-	N/A	
1892–93	Did not enter											Winners	N/A	N/A	-	N/A	
1893–94	Did not enter											Semi-final	N/A	Charity Cup Runners-up	-	N/A	
1894–95	Did not enter											First round	N/A	N/A	-	N/A	
1895–96	Glasgow League	−	6	1	0	5	8	17	−9	2	4th	Third round	N/A	Glasgow Cup Runners-up Charity Cup Runners-up	-	Unknown	Unknown
1896–97	Glasgow League	−	8	6	1	1	23	10	13	13	1st	First round	N/A	N/A	-	Robert Smyth McColl	Unknown
1897–98	Glasgow League	−	8	5	1	2	23	17	6	11	2nd	Third round	N/A	Glasgow Cup Runners-up Charity Cup Runners-up	-	Robert Smyth McColl	7
1898–99	Glasgow League	−	10	4	2	4	19	17	2	10	3rd	Third round	N/A	Sheriff of London Charity Shield Winners (shared) Glasgow Cup Winners	-	Robert Smyth McColl	8
1899–1900	Inter City League	−	10	2	1	7	9	23	−14	5	6th	Runners-up	N/A	N/A	-	Robert Smyth McColl	5
1900–01	Division One	1	20	7	3	10	33	37	−4	17	7th	Second round	N/A	N/A	-	Robert Smyth McColl / David Wilson	7
1900–01	Inter City League	−	10	1	1	8	6	28	−22	3	6th	Second round	N/A	N/A	-	Harry Reginald Dinsmore	3
1901–02	Division One	1	18	5	4	9	21	32	−11	14	8th	Third round	N/A	Glasgow Exhibition Cup Quarter-final	-	David Wilson / Thomas A. Bowie	4
1901–02	Inter City League	−	10	0	2	8	5	10	−5	2	6th	Third round	N/A	Glasgow Exhibition Cup Quarter-final	-	Willie Lennie / Harry Reginald Dinsmore	2
1902–03 (Note: Last season playing home matches at second Hampden Park.)	Division One	1	22	5	5	12	33	48	−15	15	10th	First round	N/A	N/A	-	Alexander Ferguson Currie	Unknown
1902–03	Inter City League	−	8	1	0	7	11	23	−12	2	9th	First round	N/A	N/A	-	Hugh Crawford Shaw	3
1903–04 (Note: First season playing home matches at (third) Hampden Park.)	Division One	1	26	6	9	11	28	47	−19	21	8th	First round	N/A	N/A	-	Peter Forbes Jones / Alexander McAllister	5
1903–04	Inter City League	−	5	2	1	2	5	4	1	5	−	First round	N/A	N/A	-	Unknown	Unknown
1904–05	Division One	1	26	6	8	12	28	45	−17	20	12th	First round	N/A	N/A	-	David Wilson	5
1904–05	Glasgow League	−	8	3	1	4	9	12	−3	7	4th	First round	N/A	N/A	-	Peter Forbes Jones / David Wilson / William Davidson	2
1905–06	Division One	1	30	5	4	21	41	88	−47	14	16th	Second round	N/A	Charity Cup Runners-up	-	William Davidson	8
1905–06	Glasgow League	−	5	1	0	4	4	9	−5	2	6th	Second round	N/A	Charity Cup Runners-up	-	John Dick / John S. Murphy / John Nicol / Johnny McLean	1
1906–07	Division One	1	34	9	6	19	51	66	−15	24	15th	Semi-final	N/A	N/A	-	Andy Armour	11
1907–08	Division One	1	34	7	8	19	54	84	−30	22	16th	Third round	N/A	Charity Cup Runners-up	-	Thomas Fitchie	15
1908–09	Division One	1	34	6	13	15	42	65	−23	25	15th	Third round	N/A	Edinburgh Exhibition Cup Semi-final	-	Harry Paul	8
1909–10	Division One	1	34	12	6	16	54	74	−20	30	14th	Third round	N/A	N/A	-	Robert Smyth McColl	17
1910–11	Division One	1	34	5	4	25	28	80	−52	14	18th	Second round	N/A	N/A	-	James Hamilton / George Ramsay	3
1911–12	Division One	1	34	8	9	17	29	53	−24	25	17th	Third round	N/A	N/A	-	John Clark	7
1912–13	Division One	1	34	5	3	26	34	88	−54	13	18th	Third round	N/A	N/A	-	Willie Walker	8
1913–14	Division One	1	38	10	9	19	52	84	−32	29	15th	Fourth round	N/A	N/A	-	Bob Morton	22
1914–15	Division One	1	38	4	5	29	27	90	−63	13	20th	N/A (Note: The Scottish Cup was not held in the 1914–15, 1915–16, 1916–17, 1917–18 or 1918–19 seasons due to World War I, or the 1939–40, 1940–41, 1941–42, 1942–43, 1943–44, 1944–45 or 1945–46 seasons due to World War II.)	N/A	War Fund Shield Quarter-final	-	Jim Walker / Alan Morton	4
1915–16	Scottish League	1	38	11	6	21	53	100	−47	28	18th	N/A	N/A	N/A	-	Bob Morton	15
1916–17	Scottish League	1	38	11	7	20	56	81	−25	29	18th	N/A	N/A	Charity Cup Runners-up	-	Robert Forsyth McDermid	11
1917–18	Scottish League	1	34	14	6	14	64	63	+1	34	7th	N/A	N/A	War Fund Shield Quarter-final	-	Bob Morton	15
1918–19	Scottish League	1	34	15	5	14	59	57	+2	35	8th	N/A	N/A	Victory Cup Second round Charity Cup Runners-up	-	Bob Morton	21
1919–20	Scottish League	1	42	14	10	18	67	73	−6	38	12th	Third round	N/A	Charity Cup Runners-up	-	John Barr Bell	25
1920–21	Scottish League	1	42	11	11	20	45	80	−35	33	19th	First round	N/A	N/A	-	Andy Fyfe	11
1921–22	Division One	1	42	9	10	23	38	82	−44	28	21st	Second round	N/A	Charity Cup Runners-up	-	Andy Fyfe	10
1922–23	Division Two	2	38	24	9	5	73	31	+42	57	1st	Third round	N/A	Charity Cup Runners-up	-	Russell Moreland	17
1923–24	Division One	1	38	11	9	18	43	60	−17	31	17th	Third round	N/A	N/A	-	James McAlpine	9
1924–25	Division One	1	38	11	9	18	50	72	−22	31	17th	Second round	N/A	N/A	-	Robert Gillespie	17
1925–26	Division One	1	38	15	4	19	70	81	−11	34	13th	Second round	N/A	Charity Cup Runners-up	-	Robert Rennie Milne Barr	15
1926–27	Division One	1	38	15	6	17	74	84	−10	36	12th	Second round	N/A	N/A	-	Laurie McBain	17
1927–28	Division One	1	38	12	6	20	69	80	−11	30	16th	Semi-final	N/A	Charity Cup Runners-up	-	Douglas McLelland	19
1928–29	Division One	1	38	18	7	13	100	69	+31	43	5th (Note: 5th place in the 1928–29 Scottish Division One is Queen's Park's highest-ever league finish.)	Second round	N/A	Glasgow Cup Runners-up	-	Douglas McLelland	27
1929–30	Division One	1	38	15	4	19	67	80	−13	34	15th	First round	N/A	N/A	-	Douglas McLelland	19
1930–31	Division One	1	38	13	7	18	71	72	−1	33	13th	Second round	N/A	Charity Cup Runners-up	-	James McAlpine	19
1931–32	Division One	1	38	13	5	20	59	79	−20	31	16th	Second round	N/A	Glasgow Cup Runners-up	-	James McAlpine / John Dodds	13
1932–33	Division One	1	38	17	7	14	78	79	−1	41	9th	Second round	N/A	Charity Cup Runners-up	-	John Dodds	30
1933–34	Division One	1	38	13	5	20	65	85	−20	31	15th	Second round	N/A	N/A	-	John Dodds	20
1934–35	Division One	1	38	13	10	15	61	80	−19	36	12th	Second round	N/A	Charity Cup Runners-up	-	John Dodds	27
1935–36	Division One	1	38	11	10	17	58	75	−17	32	13th	First round	N/A	N/A	-	John Dodds	17
1936–37	Division One	1	38	9	12	17	51	77	−26	30	15th	Second round	N/A	Charity Cup Runners-up	-	Joseph Kyle	15
1937–38	Division One	1	38	11	12	15	59	74	−15	34	12th	Second round	N/A	N/A	-	William Martin	30
1938–39	Division One	1	38	11	5	22	57	83	−26	27	19th	Second round	N/A	N/A	-	Joseph Kyle	18
1939–40	Division Two	2	4	1	3	0	7	5	+2	5	−	N/A	N/A	Emergency Cup First round Glasgow Cup Runners-up	-	Joseph Kyle	3
1939–40	Emergency League West (Note: The official Scottish Football League was suspended from 1939 to 1946 due to World War II. Unofficial competitions were held.)	-	30	7	7	16	55	82	−27	21	14th	N/A	N/A	Emergency Cup First round Glasgow Cup Runners-up	-	Joseph Kyle	22
1940–41	Southern League	-	30	6	3	21	46	79	−33	15	16th	N/A	Southern League Cup Group stage	Summer Cup First round	-	William Browning	11
1941–42	Southern League	-	30	11	5	14	55	56	−1	27	10th	N/A	Southern League Cup Group stage	Summer Cup First round	-	David Wilkie	13
1942–43	Southern League	-	30	7	4	19	55	76	−21	18	14th	N/A	Southern League Cup Group stage	Summer Cup Second round	-	Arthur Dixon	16
1943–44	Southern League	-	30	10	6	14	64	75	−11	26	11th	N/A	Southern League Cup Group stage	Summer Cup First round	-	Arthur Dixon / Johnny Aitkenhead	13
1944–45	Southern League	-	30	12	4	14	60	62	−2	28	10th	N/A	Southern League Cup Semi-final	Summer Cup Second round	-	Arthur Dixon	15
1945–46	Southern League A Division	-	30	11	8	11	60	60	0	30	8th	N/A	Southern League Cup Group stage	Victory Cup First round Glasgow Cup Winners	-	Colin Liddell	15
1946–47	Division A	1	30	8	6	16	47	60	−13	22	13th	Third round	Group stage	N/A	-	Andrew Irving Aitken	14
1947–48	Division A	1	30	9	2	19	45	75	−30	20	16th	Third round	Group stage	N/A	-	Andrew Irving Aitken	11
1948–49	Division B	2	30	14	7	9	66	49	+17	35	5th	First round	Group stage	Supplementary Cup First round	-	Robert Hugh Gunn	21
1949–50	Division B	2	30	12	7	11	63	59	+4	31	9th	First round	Group stage	Supplementary Cup First round	-	Derek Grierson	17
1950–51	Division B	2	30	13	7	10	56	53	+3	33	6th	Second round	Group stage	N/A	-	Derek Grierson	20
1951–52	Division B	2	30	8	4	18	40	62	−22	20	15th	Second round	Group stage	Saint Mungo Cup First round Supplementary Cup First round	-	Derek Grierson	15
1952–53	Division B	2	30	15	7	8	70	46	+24	37	3rd	Second round	Group stage	Charity Cup Runners-up	-	Seamus O'Connell	20
1953–54	Division B	2	30	9	9	12	56	51	+5	27	10th	First round	Group stage	N/A	-	Maxwell Murray	14
1954–55	Division B	2	30	15	5	10	65	36	+29	35	4th	Fourth round	Group stage	Charity Cup Runners-up	-	Robert Johnston McCann	15
1955–56	Division Two	2	36	23	8	5	78	28	+50	54	1st	Sixth round	Group stage	N/A	-	Charlie Church	17
1956–57	Division One	1	34	11	7	16	55	59	−4	29	13th	Sixth round	Group stage	Charity Cup Runners-up	-	Unknown	Unknown
1957–58	Division One	1	34	4	1	29	41	114	−73	9	18th	Third round	Group stage	N/A	-	Andrew P. McEwan	9
1958–59	Division Two	2	36	9	6	21	53	80	−27	24	18th	Second round	Group stage	N/A	-	Malcolm Darroch	8
1959–60	Division Two	2	36	17	2	17	65	79	−14	36	11th	Third round	Group stage	N/A	-	Charlie Church	13
1960–61	Division Two	2	36	10	6	20	61	87	−26	26	15th	First round	Group stage	N/A	-	Peter Buchanan	17
1961–62	Division Two	2	36	12	9	15	64	62	+2	33	12th	First round	Group stage	N/A	-	Peter Buchanan	24
1962–63	Division Two	2	36	13	6	17	66	72	−6	32	14th	Third round	Group stage	N/A	-	Peter Buchanan	18
1963–64	Division Two	2	36	17	4	15	57	54	+3	38	7th	Second round	Group stage	N/A	-	Peter Buchanan	23
1964–65	Division Two	2	36	17	9	10	57	41	+16	43	4th	Second round	Group stage	Glasgow Cup Runners-up	-	Malky Mackay	16
1965–66	Division Two	2	36	13	7	16	62	65	−3	33	13th	First round	Group stage	N/A	-	Malky Mackay	14
1966–67	Division Two	2	38	15	10	13	78	68	+10	40	7th	Third round	Group stage	N/A	-	Niall Hopper	13
1967–68	Division Two	2	36	20	8	8	76	47	+29	48	4th	Second preliminary round	Quarter-final	N/A	-	Ian Campbell	18
1968–69	Division Two	2	36	13	7	16	50	59	−9	33	11th	First round	Group stage	N/A	-	Ian Campbell	10
1969–70	Division Two	2	36	10	6	20	38	62	−24	26	15th	Second preliminary round	Group stage	N/A	-	Ian Whitehead	12
1970–71	Division Two	2	36	13	4	19	51	72	−21	30	14th	Third round	Group stage	N/A	-	Malky Mackay	8
1971–72	Division Two	2	36	12	9	15	47	61	−14	33	12th	Second round	Group stage	N/A	-	Malky Mackay	11
1972–73	Division Two	2	36	9	12	15	44	61	−17	30	14th	Second round	Group stage	N/A	-	Malky Mackay	9
1973–74	Division Two	2	36	12	4	20	42	64	−22	28	14th	Third round	Group stage	N/A	-	Ian Fallis	12
1974–75	Division Two	2	38	10	10	18	41	54	−13	30	16th (Note: The teams placed 1st–6th were added to the new First Division (below a new Premier Division) with the remaining clubs making up the new Second Division.)	Fourth round	Group stage	N/A	David McParland	Malky Mackay / Hugh McGill	10
1975–76	Second Division	3	26	10	9	7	41	33	+8	29	4th	First round	Group stage	Spring Cup First round	David McParland	Hugh McGill / Alexander Crawford McNaughton	8
1976–77	Second Division	3	39	17	11	11	65	51	+14	45	5th	Third round	Group stage	N/A	Joe Gilroy	Bernard Donnelly	15
1977–78	Second Division	3	39	13	15	11	52	51	+1	41	7th	Fifth round	Second round	N/A	Joe Gilroy	Bernard Donnelly	7
1978–79	Second Division	3	39	8	12	19	46	57	−11	28	13th	Third round	Second round	N/A	Joe Gilrory → Eddie Hunter	John Ian Ballantyne	14
1979–80	Second Division	3	39	16	9	14	59	47	+12	41	5th	First round	Third round	N/A	Eddie Hunter	James Anthony Gillespie	21
1980–81	Second Division	3	39	16	18	5	62	43	+19	50	1st	First round	Second round	N/A	Eddie Hunter	Gerard McCoy	17
1981–82	First Division	2	39	13	10	16	41	41	0	36	8th	Fifth round	Group stage	N/A	Eddie Hunter	Gerald M. Crawley	9
1982–83	First Division	2	39	6	11	22	44	80	−36	23	14th	Fifth round	Group stage	N/A	Eddie Hunter	Jimmy Gilmour	10
1983–84	Second Division	3	39	14	8	17	58	63	−5	36	10th	Third round	Second round	N/A	Eddie Hunter	Lex Grant	17
1984–85	Second Division	3	39	12	9	18	48	55	−7	33	10th	Second round	First round	Glasgow Cup Runners-up	Eddie Hunter	Jimmy Nicholson	18
1985–86	Second Division	3	39	19	8	12	61	39	+22	46	4th	Fourth round	First round	N/A	Eddie Hunter	Gary Fraser	11
1986–87	Second Division	3	39	9	19	11	48	49	−1	37	9th	Second round	First round	N/A	Eddie Hunter	Ross Caven	13
1987–88	Second Division	3	39	21	9	9	64	44	+20	51	3rd	Second round	Second round	N/A	Eddie Hunter	Paul O'Brien	17
1988–89	Second Division	3	39	10	18	11	50	49	+1	38	7th	Third round	First round	N/A	Eddie Hunter	George Campbell Crooks	8
1989–90	Second Division	3	39	13	10	16	40	51	−11	36	11th	First round	Second round	N/A	Eddie Hunter	Michael Hendry	10
1990–91	Second Division	3	39	17	8	14	48	42	+6	42	5th	Second round	Second round	Challenge Cup First round	Eddie Hunter	**Michael Hendry**	17
1991–92	Second Division	3	39	14	7	18	59	63	−4	35	9th	First round	Second round	Challenge Cup Second round	Eddie Hunter	Stephen McCormick	17
1992–93	Second Division	3	39	8	12	19	51	73	−22	28	11th	First round	First round	Challenge Cup First round	Eddie Hunter	James Rodden	9
1993–94	Second Division	3	39	12	10	17	52	76	−24	34	11th (Note: The teams placed 7th–14th were relegated to a new Third Division.)	First round	First round	Challenge Cup Second round	Eddie Hunter	John O'Neill	17
1994–95	Third Division	4	36	12	6	18	46	57	−11	42	8th	Second round	First round	Challenge Cup First round	Eddie Hunter → Hugh McCann	Brian McPhee	8
1995–96	Third Division	4	36	12	12	12	40	43	−3	48	6th	Third round	First round	Challenge Cup First round	Hugh McCann	Scott Edgar	6
1996–97	Third Division	4	36	9	9	18	46	59	−13	36	8th	Third round	Second round	Challenge Cup First round	Hugh McCann	Daniel Ferry	7
1997–98	Third Division	4	36	10	11	15	42	55	−13	41	7th	Second round	First round	Challenge Cup First round	Graeme Elder	Scott Edgar	9
1998–99 (Note: Home games played at Lesser Hampden due to major redevelopment work at Hampden.)	Third Division	4	36	11	11	14	41	46	−5	44	6th	Third round	First round	N/A (Note: The Scottish Challenge Cup was not held in the 1998–99 season.)	John McCormack	Scott Edgar	7
1999–2000	Third Division	4	36	20	9	7	54	37	+17	69	1st	Second round	Second round	Challenge Cup quarter-finals	John McCormack	Mark Andrew Gallagher	13
2000–01	Second Division	3	36	10	10	16	28	40	−12	40	9th	Second round	Second round	Challenge Cup Second round	John McCormack	Mark Andrew Gallagher	7
2001–02	Third Division	4	36	9	8	19	38	53	−15	35	10th (Note: 10th place in the 2001–02 Scottish Third Division and in the 2013–14 Scottish League Two is Queen's Park's joint lowest-ever league finish.)	Second round	First round	Challenge Cup First round	John McCormack	Stephen Canning / Ross Douglas Jackson	5
2002–03	Third Division	4	36	7	11	18	39	51	−12	32	8th	Third round	Second round	Challenge Cup Semi-final	John McCormack → Kenny Brannigan	John Gemmel	8
2003–04	Third Division	4	36	10	11	15	41	53	−12	41	7th	First round	Second round	Challenge Cup First round	Kenny Brannigan	Steven Reilly	7
2004–05	Third Division	4	36	13	9	14	51	50	+1	48	4th	Second round	First round	Challenge Cup Second round	Kenny Brannigan → Billy Stark	Frankie Carrol	14
2005–06	Third Division	4	36	13	12	11	47	42	+5	51	6th	Third round	Second round	Challenge Cup First round	Billy Stark	Mark Ferry	8
2006–07	Third Division	4	36	21	5	10	57	28	+29	68	3rd	First round	Third round	Challenge Cup Second round	Billy Stark	David Weatherston	16
2007–08	Second Division	3	36	13	5	18	48	51	−3	44	8th	Third round	Second round	Challenge Cup Second round	Billy Stark → Gardner Speirs	Alan Trouten	12
2008–09	Second Division	3	36	7	12	17	35	54	−19	33	9th	Fifth round	First round	Challenge Cup First round	Gardner Speirs	Paul Cairney	7
2009–10	Third Division	4	36	15	6	15	42	42	0	51	4th	Second round	First round	Challenge Cup First round	Gardner Speirs	Barry Douglas	8
2010–11	Third Division	4	36	18	5	13	57	43	+14	59	3rd	Second round	First round	Challenge Cup Second round	Gardner Speirs	Jamie Longworth	12
2011–12	Third Division	4	36	19	6	11	70	48	+22	63	2nd	Fourth round	First round	Challenge Cup First round	Gardner Speirs	Jamie Longworth	20
2012–13	Third Division	4	36	16	8	12	60	54	+6	56	3rd	Third round	Third round	Challenge Cup Second round	Gardner Speirs	Lawrence Shankland	10
2013–14 (Note: Home matches in second part of season played at Excelsior Stadium, Airdrie due to repurposing of Hampden for the 2014 Commonwealth Games.)	League Two (Note: The leagues were renamed for the 2013–14 season, but the divisions remained as before.)	4	36	5	9	22	36	68	−32	24	10th	Third round	First round	Challenge Cup First round	Gardner Speirs → Gus Macpherson	Eamonn Brophy	7
2014–15 (Note: Home matches in first part of season played at Excelsior Stadium, Airdrie due to repurposing of Hampden for the 2014 Commonwealth Games.)	League Two	4	36	17	10	9	51	34	+17	61	2nd	Third round	First round	Challenge Cup First round	Gus Macpherson	Paul Woods	9
2015–16	League Two	4	36	15	11	10	46	32	+14	56	4th	Third round	First round	Challenge Cup Semi-final	Gus Macpherson	Paul Woods	11
2016–17	League One	3	36	12	10	14	37	51	−14	46	6th	Fourth round	Group stage	Challenge Cup Fourth round	Gus Macpherson	Ross Millen	7
2017–18	League One	3	36	7	10	19	42	72	−30	31	9th	Third round	Group stage	Challenge Cup First round	Gus Macpherson	Adam Cummins / Luke Donnelly / Aidan Keena	8
2018–19	League Two	4	36	11	10	15	44	47	−3	43	7th	Third round	Group stage	Challenge Cup Quarter-final	Gus Macpherson → Mark Roberts	David Galt / Lewis Hawke / Scott McLean	6
2019–20	League Two (Note: Season curtailed due to the COVID-19 pandemic in Scotland.)	4	28	11	7	10	37	35	+2	40	5th	Fourth round	Group stage	Challenge Cup First round	Mark Roberts → Ray McKinnon	Salim Kouider-Aïssa	13
2020–21 (Note: Home matches to end of March 2021 played at Hampden Park, the remainder (6 fixtures) played at Falkirk Stadium; matches played behind closed doors due to the Covid-19 pandemic.)	League Two (Note: Season shortened due to the Covid-19 pandemic.)	4	22	17	3	2	43	13	+29	54	1st	Second round	Group stage	N/A (Note: The Scottish Challenge Cup was not played in the 2020–21 season due to the Covid-19 pandemic.)	Ray McKinnon	Bob McHugh / Simon Murray	6
2021–22 (Note: Home matches played at Firhill Stadium, Glasgow due to redevelopment work at Lesser Hampden not being completed.)	League One	3	36	11	18	7	51	36	+15	51	4th (Note: Promoted in play-offs.)	Third round	Group stage	Challenge Cup Third round Glasgow Cup Runners-up	Laurie Ellis	Bob McHugh / Luca Connell	8
2022–23 (Note: Home matches played at Ochilview Park, Stenhousemuir due to redevelopment work at Lesser Hampden not being completed. Two fixtures played at Hampden Park.)	Championship	2	36	17	7	12	63	52	+11	58	3rd (Note: Eliminated in promotion play-offs.)	Fourth round (Note: Qualified for quarter-finals onfield, but disqualified for using ineligible player.)	Group stage	Challenge Cup Quarter-final	Owen Coyle	Simon Murray	18
2023–24 (Note: Home matches played at Hampden Park.)	Championship	2	36	11	10	15	50	56	-6	43	8th	Third round	Group stage	Challenge Cup Fourth round	Robin Veldman → Callum Davidson	Ruari Paton	17
2024–25	Championship	2	36	9	8	17	36	55	-19	35	8th	Quarter-final	Second round	Challenge Cup Runners-up	Callum Davidson → Steven MacLean	Zak Rudden	9

== League performance summary ==
The Scottish Football League was founded in 1890 and, other than during seven years of hiatus during World War II, (Note: The incomplete 1939–40 edition has not been counted in the totals.) the national top division has been played every season since. (Note: The top tier became the Scottish Premier League in 1998, and all four divisions became the Scottish Professional Football League in 2013.) The following is a summary of Queen's Park's divisional status:

- **125** total eligible seasons (including 2021–22)
- **42** seasons in top level (Note: Has existed between 1890–1939, and since 1946.)
- **28** seasons in second level (Note: Has existed between 1893–1915, 1921–1939 and since 1946.)
- **23** seasons in third level (Note: Has existed between 1923–1926, 1946–1949, and since 1976.)
- **22** seasons in fourth level (Note: Has existed since 1994.)
- **10** seasons not involved – before club was league member
