= 1873–74 Queen's Park F.C. season =

Queen's Park
1873–74 season
- Stadium: Hampden Park
- Scottish Cup: Winners
Home colours

The 1873–74 season was the third season of competitive football by Queen's Park.

== Overview ==
As one of the eight founder members of the Scottish FA, Queen's Park took part in the inaugural Scottish Cup. Subscription fees from 15 of the 16 clubs that entered the competition were used to pay for the trophy for which they compete.

Queen's Park's long and successful history in the competition began with a 7–0 win over Dumbreck in the highest scoring game in the inaugural competition on 25 October. They would go on to reach the final without conceding a goal with wins over Eastern and Renton in the quarter-finals and semi-finals respectively. In the final, they would face off against another Glasgow side – Clydesdale. Second half goals from Billy MacKinnon and Robert Leckie saw Queen's Park run out 2–0 winners at the original Hampden Park to lift the trophy for the first time.

This was the first season that the club didn't enter the FA Cup.

For the first time, Queen's Park played in their now traditional black and white hoops. Between 1874 and 1876, each player wore distinctive socks.

== Results ==
=== Scottish Cup ===
| Date | Round | Opponents | H / A | Result F–A | Scorers | Attendance |
|---|---|---|---|---|---|---|
| 25 October 1873 | First round | Dumbreck | H | 7–0 | Broadfoot, Lawrie (2), B. MacKinnon (2), H. McNeil (2) | |
| 22 November 1873 | Quarter-final | Eastern | H | 1–0 | Weir | |
| 13 December 1873 | Semi-final | Renton | H | 2–0 | B. MacKinnon (2) | |
| 21 March 1874 | Final | Clydesdale | H | 2–0 | B. MacKinnon 60', Leckie 85' | 2,500 |

Notes

1. A-The Queen's Park vs. Eastern match was due to kick off at 15:00 but, due to the late arrival of the Eastern team, kick-off was delayed and the match was abandoned with 10 minutes still to play due to darkness as a result. The result was allowed to stand.

== Squad statistics ==
| Name | Scottish Cup | |
| Name | Apps | Goals |
|---|---|---|
| Robert W. Neill | 4 | 0 |
| Joseph Taylor | 4 | 0 |
| Charles Campbell | 4 | 0 |
| William Ker | 1 | 0 |
| James J. Thomson | 4 | 0 |
| Robert Leckie | 4 | 1 |
| Angus MacKinnon | 4 | 0 |
| Billy MacKinnon | 4 | 5 |
| T. Lawrie | 4 | 2 |
| A. P. Broadfoot | 2 | 1 |
| Henry McNeil | 3 | 2 |
| V. Dickson | 3 | 0 |
| Jerry Weir | 3 | 1 |
