= 1875 Scottish Cup final =

1875 Scottish Cup Final
- Event: 1874–75 Scottish Cup
Queen's Park	Renton
3	0
- Date: 10 April 1875
- Venue: Hampden Park, Crosshill
- Referee: A. Campbell (Clydesdale)
- Attendance: 7,000
- Weather: Sunny

The 1875 Scottish Cup final was the second final of the Scottish Cup and the final of the 1874–75 Scottish Cup, the most prestigious knockout football competition in Scotland. The match took place at Hampden Park on 10 April 1875 and was contested by Queen's Park and Renton.

Queen's Park won the match 3–0 with goals from Angus MacKinnon, Thomas Highet and Billy MacKinnon.

== Background ==
For defending champions Queen's Park, this was their second consecutive appearance in the final following the creation of the competition the previous season. Renton reached the final for the first time.

The teams had met in the Scottish Cup once before. In the 1873–74 semi-final, Queen's Park beat Renton 2–0 at Hampden Park on 13 December 1873.

== Route to the final ==
Both clubs entered the competition in the first round. Neither club won all its matches before the final at the first attempt. Queen's Park needed two replays in the semi-final to eliminate Clydesdale, the team they defeated in the previous final. Renton also required a replay at the semi-final stage to see off Dumbarton.

=== Queen's Park ===
Round	Opposition	Score
First round	Western	1–0
Second round	West End	7–0
Quarter-final	Rovers	w/o
Semi-final	Clydesdale	0–0
Semi-final replay	Clydesdale	2–2
Semi-final second replay	Clydesdale	1–0

Queen's Park began their defence of the cup in the first round on 24 October 1874. In the competition's early years, the first few rounds were regionalised so Queen's had been drawn away to fellow Glasgow club Western and, in a tightly contested match, they won 1–0 at Regent's Park. The second round saw a home tie with West End which was a much easier tie for the defending champions who equalled the tournament record for the largest margin of victory as they won 7–0 at Hampden Park. They then didn't play a match in the quarter-finals as their opponents Rovers, who hadn't played a match in the tournament following a walkover against Hamilton in the first round and a bye in the second round, scratched from the tie meaning Queen's Park advanced to the semi-finals. This set up a replay of the 1874 final against Clydesdale. The first match at Clydesdale's Kinning Park finished scoreless on 20 March 1875 and the replay a week later at Hampden Park also ended in a draw. However, in the second replay on 3 April, the stalemate was finally broken as Queen's Park won 1–0 to reach the final for the second year running.

=== Renton ===
Round	Opposition	Score
First round	Blythswood	w/o
Second round	Helensburgh	2–0
Quarter-final	Eastern	1–0
Semi-final	Dumbarton	0–0
Semi-final replay	Dumbarton	1–0

After receiving a walkover against Glasgow side Blythswood in the first round, Renton hosted fellow Dunbartonshire club Helensburgh on 21 November 1874 and the home side won 2–0. Renton were then involved in one of just two quarter-final matches as they defeated the Glasgow side Eastern 1–0 at home on Boxing Day. In the semi-finals, they face Dunbartonshire rivals Dumbarton. The first match, played in Renton, finished in a 1–1 draw before Renton eliminated their rivals with a 1–0 away win.

== Match ==
=== Report ===
Renton won the toss and elected to play with the slight breeze to their backs. In the first half, Queen's Park soaked up pressure from a Renton side who elected to play the ball long and tackle hard. Despite this, they were unable to break down Queen's Park who created chances for Jamie Weir, Harry McNeil and Tom Highet. However, referee A. Campbell ended the half with the game scoreless.

After the interval, a change of ends saw the wind now in Renton's faces. Queen's Park were on the front foot but couldn't find a breakthrough and the spectators had to wait until the last 15 minutes for the three goals. Angus MacKinnon opened the scoring from a Weir corner before, five minutes later, McNeil ran forward and set up Highet for 2–0. Shortly before full time, Billy McKinnon sealed the win with a fine shot.

Edinburgh newspaper The Scotsman reported after the game that the match was "an exceptionally rough one" with "charging which seems to be the speciality of the Renton men".

=== Detail ===
10 April 1875
15:45

Queen's Park	3–0	Renton
A. MacKinnon 75'; Highet 80'; B. MacKinnon

Hampden Park, Crosshill
Attendance: 7,000
Referee: A. Campbell (Clydesdale)

QUEEN'S PARK:
GK	(Scotland) Robert W. Neill
FB	(Scotland) Joseph Taylor (c)
FB	(Scotland) James Phillips
HB	(Scotland) Charles Campbell
HB	(Scotland) John Dickson
FW	(Scotland) Jerry Weir
FW	(Scotland) Thomas Lawrie
FW	(Scotland) Billy MacKinnon
FW	(Scotland) Angus MacKinnon
FW	(Scotland) Henry McNeil
FW	(Scotland) Thomas Highet

RENTON:
GK	(Scotland) Turnbull
FB	(Scotland) McKay
FB	(Scotland) J. Kennedy
HB	(Scotland) Scallion
HB	(Scotland) McGregor
FW	(Scotland) McRae
FW	(Scotland) Melville
FW	(Scotland) J. Brown
FW	(Scotland) M. Kennedy
FW	(Scotland) Glen
FW	(Scotland) L. Brown
