= 1876 Scottish Cup final =

- Event: 1875–76 Scottish Cup
Queen's Park	3rd Lanark RV
1	1
- Date: 11 March 1876
- Venue: Hamilton Crescent, Partick
- Referee: A.S. McBride
- Attendance: 10,000
- Weather: Sunny

Replay
Queen's Park	3rd Lanark RV
2	0
- Date: 18 March 1876
- Venue: Hamilton Crescent, Partick
- Referee: A.S. McBride
- Attendance: 6,000

The 1876 Scottish Cup final was the third final of the Scottish Cup and the final of the 1875–76 Scottish Cup, the most prestigious knockout football competition in Scotland. The original match took place at Hamilton Crescent on 11 March 1876 and was contested by Queen's Park and 3rd Lanarkshire Rifle Volunteers. The match was the first final to be held at a neutral venue and also the first to require a replay to decide a winner.

The first match ended in a 1–1 draw with the first goal from Drinnan of 3rd Lanark RV in the second minute of the match. Queen's Park equalised in the second half with a goal from Thomas Highet. In the replay a week later – also played at Hamilton Crescent – Queen's Park won 2–0 with a double from Highet to seal a hat-trick of cup final victories.

== Background ==
In the three years of the competition, Queen's Park had reached every final, even with a significant rise in the number of competitors. This was 3rd Lanark RV's début appearance in the final having previously reached the quarter-finals in 1873–74 and 1874–75.

This was the first time the final was played at a neutral venue as both the previous finals in 1874 and 1875 were played at Hampden Park, the home of Queen's Park.

The match also marked the first competitive meeting of Queen's Park and 3rd Lanark RV.

== Route to the final ==
Both clubs entered the competition in the first round. Queen's Park won all their matches before the final at the first attempt, also without conceding a single goal. 3rd Lanark RV also managed similar success until the semi-final which required two replays to settle.

=== Queen's Park ===
Round	Opposition	Score
First round	Alexandra Athletic	3–0
Second round	Northern	5–0
Third round	Clydesdale	2–0
Quarter-final	Dumbreck	2–0
Semi-final	Vale of Leven	2–1

In the competition's early years, the first few rounds were regionalised so Queen's Park began their second consecutive defence of the cup on 16 October 1875 with a home tie against fellow Glasgow side Alexandra Athletic. They sealed their passage to the second round with a 3–0 win at Hampden Park. That saw Queen's take part in another all-Glasgow affair with Northern also at Hampden Park. This was an easier affair as the home side progressed with a 5–0 win. The third round was the first 'all in' round but Queen's were again drawn at home to another Glasgow-based club – Clydesdale. The two had previous in the competition having played against one another in the 1874 final and the 1875 semi-final with Queen's Park coming out on top on both occasions. This tie was to be no different as Queen's progressed with a 2–0 win in front of 3,000 spectators. The quarter-finals was another all-Glasgow affair as the defending champions eliminated Dumbreck with a 2–0 win, again at Hampden Park. Queen's semi-final was the only match other than the final to be played in front of 10,000 spectators as they took on Dunbartonshire side Vale of Leven. The game was played at Hampden Park on 8 January 1876 and, despite conceding their first goal in the competition, Queen's Park sealed a third successive appearance in the final by winning 2–1.

=== 3rd Lanark RV ===
Round	Opposition	Score
First round	Havelock	2–0
Second round	Rangers	2–1
Third round	Levern	3–0
Quarter-final	Western	5–0
Semi-final	Dumbarton	1–1
Semi-final replay	Dumbarton	1–1
Semi-final second replay	Dumbarton	3–0

3rd Lanark RV also began the competition with a first round tie at home to Glasgow-based Havelock. The match took place at Cathkin Park on 16 October 1875 with 3rd Lanark RV recording a 2–0 win. That set up a second round tie with Rangers at the same venue on 30 October in which Peter Campbell scored the only goal to give the away side a 1–0 win. However, as was common at the time, 3rd Lanark protested to the Scottish Football Association that Rangers kick-off in both halves and the result of the match was declared void. In the re-match two weeks later at Rangers' ground, Flesher's Haugh, 3rd Lanark RV ran out 2–1 winners. In the third round, 3rd Lanark defeated Levern 3–0 at Wellington Park in Hurlet to advance to the quarter-finals. There they faced fellow Glasgow side Western at Cathkin Park against whom they recorded a convincing 5–0 win. This set up a semi-final marathon against Dumbarton. Goals from Crichton and Harley saw the two sides play out a 1–1 draw in the first match at Cathkin Park on 8 January 1876. Crichton scored for 3rd Lanark RV again in the replay in Dumbarton a week later but it wasn't enough as they again drew 1–1. The second replay at Cathkin Park on 22 January was to prove decisive as 3rd Lanark RV ran out 3–0 winners to reach the final for the first time.

== Original match ==
=== Report ===
Queen's Park kicked off the match in front off 10,000 spectators at 15:35 with a slight wind in their faces. However, it was 3rd Lanark who got off to a better start despite playing into the sunlight as hey took the lead within two minutes. The Herald described the opening goal as "a grand and successful raid" as Drinnan, "to the astonishment of all", kicked the ball between the posts. It was the first goal Queen's Park had conceded in a Scottish Cup final. They had been expected to win the match but they weren't playing to their potential and found themselves a goal down at the break.

In the second half, it took less than four minutes for Queen's Park to level the scores. A fine piece of dribbling by Billy MacKinnon on the right resulted in a clever pass for Highet who slotted the ball home. The rest of the match was played out with neither side able to find a winner as the cup final ended in a draw for the first time. Neither team was particularly praised for their performance in the match however Billy MacKinnon of Queen's Park and William Miller of 3rd Lanark received plaudits for their fast runs and dribbling skills.

=== Details ===
11 March 1876
15:35

Queen's Park	1–1	3rd Lanark RV
Highet 49'		W. Drinnan 2'

Hamilton Crescent, Partick
Attendance: 10,000
Referee: A.S. McBride (Vale of Leven)

QUEEN'S PARK:
GK	(Scotland) John Dickson
FB	(Scotland) Joseph Taylor
FB	(Scotland) Robert W. Neill
HB	(Scotland) Charles Campbell
HB	(Scotland) James Phillips
FW	(Scotland) Tom Lawrie
FW	(Scotland) Billy MacKinnon
FW	(Scotland) D. McGill
FW	(Scotland) Angus MacKinnon
FW	(Scotland) Thomas Highet
FW	(Scotland) Henry McNeil

3RD LANARK RV:
GK	(Scotland) Wallace
FB	(Scotland) John Hunter
FB	(Scotland) J. Watson
HB	(Scotland) White
HB	(Scotland) Davie Davidson
FW	(Scotland) Crichton
FW	(Scotland) W. Drinnan
FW	(Scotland) Samuel Scoular
FW	(Scotland) McDonald
FW	(Scotland) William Miller
FW	(Scotland) Robert Walker

== Replay ==
=== Report ===
Queen's Park made two changes for the replay as Tom Lawrie and Angus MacKinnon, who had not been fully fit for the original match, were replaced by Andrew Hillcote and T. F. Smith. As it turned out, the changes made the difference as Queen's Park returned to their usual selves. Highet was instrumental in the game's opening goal before taking the final shot to give Queen's Park the lead for the first time in the tie after 15 minutes.

In the second half, it was Highet again who struck the ball between posts to double the lead early on. As time went by, Queen's Park took their foot off the gas and almost allowed 3rd Lanark back into the match when Hunter put the ball narrowly over the bar but they held out to claim the trophy for the third year in succession.

=== Details ===
18 March 1876
15:00

Queen's Park	2–0	3rd Lanark RV
Highet 15', 46'

Hamilton Crescent, Partick
Attendance: 6,000
Referee: A.S. McBride (Vale of Leven)

QUEEN'S PARK:
GK	(Scotland) John Dickson
FB	(Scotland) Joseph Taylor
FB	(Scotland) Robert W. Neill
HB	(Scotland) Charles Campbell
HB	(Scotland) James Phillips
FW	(Scotland) Thomas Highet
FW	(Scotland) Andrew Hillcote
FW	(Scotland) D. McGill
FW	(Scotland) Henry McNeil
FW	(Scotland) T. F. Smith
FW	(Scotland) Billy MacKinnon

3RD LANARK RV:
GK	(Scotland) Wallace
FB	(Scotland) John Hunter
FB	(Scotland) Watson
HB	(Scotland) White
HB	(Scotland) Davidson
FW	(Scotland) Crichton
FW	(Scotland) W. Drinnan
FW	(Scotland) Samuel Scoular
FW	(Scotland) McDonald
FW	(Scotland) William Miller
FW	(Scotland) Robert Walker
