= 1875 in association football =

The following are events in 1875 which are relevant to the development of association football. Included are events in closely related codes, such as the Sheffield Rules.

== Events ==
- 6 March – England and Scotland meet at the Kennington Oval. The result is a 2–2 draw.
- 13 March – The 1875 FA Cup Final is contested by Royal Engineers and Old Etonians at the Kennington Oval before a crowd of 2,000. The result is a 1–1 draw, necessitating the first-ever cup final replay.
- 16 March – Royal Engineers defeat Old Etonians 2–0 in the FA Cup Final replay, again played at the Kennington Oval, with an increased attendance of 3,000.
- 10 April – Queen's Park retain the Scottish Cup by defeating Renton 3–0 in the final at Hampden Park before an attendance of 7,000.

== Clubs founded ==
=== England ===
- Birmingham City (then known as Small Heath Alliance)
- Blackburn Rovers

=== Scotland ===
- Hibernian

== Domestic cups ==
Nation	Tournament	Winner	Score		Runner-up	Venue	Title	Last honour
England	1874–75 FA Cup	Royal Engineers	Final	1–1 (a.e.t.)	Old Etonians	Kennington Oval	1st	—N/a
England	1874–75 FA Cup	Royal Engineers	Replay	2–0	Old Etonians	Kennington Oval	1st	—N/a
Scotland	1874–75 Scottish Cup	Queen's Park	3–0		Renton	Hampden Park	2nd	1873–74

== Births ==
- 23 May – Frank Forman (d. 1961), England international half-back in nine matches (1898–1903).
- 10 August – Sam McCappin (d. 1945), English footballer
- 23 August – Howard Spencer (d. 1940), England international full-back in six matches (1897–1905).
- 24 July – George Molyneux (d. 1942), England international full-back in four matches (1902–1903).
- 5 September – Jimmy Settle (d. 1954), England international forward in six matches (1899–1903), scoring six goals.
- 6 September – Albert Wilkes (d. 1936), England international half-back in five matches (1901–1902).
