= Highet =

Highet is a surname, and may refer to:

- Alex Highet (c. 1914 – 1940), Scottish footballer
- Allan Highet (1913–1992), New Zealand politician
- Fiona Highet, Scottish entomologist
- Gilbert Highet (1906–1978), Scottish classicist
- Harry Highet (1892–1989), New Zealand engineer
- John Highet (1886–1950), Scottish footballer
- Thomas Highet (1853–1907), Scottish footballer

== See also ==
- Highett (disambiguation)
