= 1875–76 Queen's Park F.C. season =

Queen's Park
1875–76 season
- Stadium: Hampden Park
- Scottish Cup: Winners
Home colours

The 1875–76 season was the fifth season of competitive football by Queen's Park.

Queen's Park played in their traditional black and white hoops and between 1874 and 1876 each player wore distinctive socks.

== Scottish Cup ==
For the third season in a row, Queen's Park won the Scottish Cup after defeating 3rd Lanark RV in a replayed final.

Date	Round	Opponents	H / A	Result F–A	Scorers	Attendance
16 October 1875	First round	Alexandra Athletic	H	3–0		
6 November 1875	Second round	Northern	H	5–0		
27 November 1875	Third round	Clydesdale	H	2–0		
18 December 1875	Quarter-final	Dumbreck	H	2–0		
8 January 1876	Semi-final	Vale of Leven	H	2–1		
11 March 1876	Final	3rd Lanark RV	N	1–1	Highet 35'	10,000
18 March 1876	Final replay	3rd Lanark RV	H	2–0	Highet 15', 46'	6,000

== Friendlies ==
Date	Opponents	H / A	Result F–A	Scorers	Attendance
9 October 1875	(England) Wanderers	H	5–0		
5 February 1876	(England) Wanderers	A	0–2		
