= 1875–76 in Scottish football =

Scottish football season

Football in Scotland
- Season: 1875–76

1875–76 in Scottish football

Scottish Cup winners
- Queen's Park

Teams in the FA Cup
- Clydesdale

Season 1875–76 was the third season of competitive domestic football in Scotland. It also saw the introduction of the international fixture against Wales. In addition, the first regional competition was introduced, with the first playing of the Edinburgh FA Cup, for clubs in Edinburgh and surrounding areas.

== Overview ==
The Scottish Cup was contested for the third time, with Queen's Park continuing to exert a stranglehold on the trophy. On the international front, the now-established fixture with England was joined in the calendar by what would become another annual contest, against Wales.

In addition, Clydesdale became the second Scottish club to compete in the FA Cup, while the first representative fixture involving two Scottish selects saw Glasgow take on Dumbarton.

== Scottish Cup ==
The increasing popularity of the competition saw 49 clubs entering the tournament's third edition, but the ultimate outcome was the same with Queen's Park lifting the trophy for a third successive year. Queen's progress to the latter stages was comfortable, eliminating Alexandra Athletic, Northern, Clydesdale and Dumbreck without conceding a goal; they had now ended Clydesdale's interest in the cup three years running. In the semi-finals, a 2–1 win over Vale of Leven saw Queen's through, while 3rd Lanark RV defeated Dumbarton in a replay.

There were two notable firsts for the final – the use of a neutral venue, and the need for a replay. The first match was staged at Hamilton Crescent rather than on Queens' ground at Hampden, with an estimated five-figure attendance. A 1–1 draw saw the local rivals from Glasgow's South Side meet at Hampden a week later, with the holders overcoming 3rd Lanark by a 2–0 scoreline.

== County honours ==
Competition	Winner	Score	Runner-up
Edinburgh FA Cup	3rd Edinburgh RV	6–0	Thistle

== FA Cup ==
For a third year running, Queen's Park chose not to enter the FA Cup, but there was Scottish representation in the draw with the inclusion of Clydesdale. The Glasgow club was drawn away to South Norwood of Surrey in round one, but as with most of Queens' previous attempts to compete in the tournament, eventually decided they withdrew. Clydesdale never entered the FA Cup again.

== Scotland national team ==
=== Overview ===
The two matches played this season proved to be the final internationals staged at the West of Scotland cricket ground in Partick. Scotland recorded a pair of comfortable victories, against both England and a Welsh team gaining its first experience of international football.

=== Results ===
Date	Venue	Opponents	Score	Competition	Scotland scorer(s)
4 March	Hamilton Crescent, Partick	England	3–0	Friendly	Billy MacKinnon, Henry McNeil, Thomas Highet
25 March	Hamilton Crescent, Partick	Wales	4–0	Friendly	John Ferguson, Jimmy Lang, Billy MacKinnon, Henry McNeil

== Representative matches ==
19 February 1876
Sheffield (England)	0–2	(Scotland) Glasgow	(Bramall Lane, Sheffield)
29 April 1876
Glasgow (Scotland)	0–2	(Scotland) Dumbarton	(Hampden Park, Crosshill)

== Notes and references ==
- Smailes, Gordon (1995). The Breedon Book of Scottish Football Records. Derby: Breedon Books. ISBN 1-85983-020-X.
