= 1876–77 Queen's Park F.C. season =

Queen's Park
1876–77 season
- Stadium: Hampden Park
- Scottish Cup: Quarter-finals
- FA Cup: Third round
- Glasgow Merchants Charity Cup: Winners

The 1876–77 season was the sixth season of competitive football by Queen's Park. This was the first season that Queen's entered both the Scottish Cup and the FA Cup.

== Scottish Cup ==
For the first time, Queen's Park lost a Scottish Cup tie when they were beaten by eventual champions Vale of Leven in the quarter-finals.

Date	Round	Opponents	H / A	Result F–A	Scorers	Attendance
30 September 1876	First round	Sandyford	H	7–0		
28 October 1876	Second round	Caledonian	H	5–0		
18 November 1876	Third round	Arthurlie	H	7–0		
2 December 1876	Fourth round	Northern	H	4–0		
30 December 1876	Quarter-final	Vale of Leven	H	2–1		

== FA Cup ==
Queen's Park entered the FA Cup for the first time since 1872–73. They received a bye through rounds one and two but they withdrew before their round match with Oxford University.

Date	Round	Opponents	H / A	Result F–A	Scorers	Attendance
November 1876	First round	Bye				
December 1876	Second round	Bye				
December 1872	Third round	(England) Oxford University	Walkover			

== Glasgow Merchants' Charity Cup ==
For the first edition of the end-of-season Glasgow Merchants' Charity Cup, Queen's Park were due to face Vale of Leven in the final. However, the Scottish Cup tie between the teams earlier in the season had ended in controversy as Queen's accused Vale of wearing illegal spikes on their boots. It was hoped the charity cup could be used to heal relations between the clubs but Vale refused to play and were replaced by Rangers.

Date	Round	Opponents	H / A	Result F–A	Scorers	Attendance
21 April 1877	Semi-final	3rd Lanark RV	H	3–0		
28 May 1877	Final	Rangers	H	4–0		

== Friendlies ==
Date	Opponents	H / A	Result F–A	Scorers	Attendance
7 October 1876	(England) Notts County	H	5–1		
4 November 1876	(England) Wanderers	A	6–0	Senior, MacKinnon (2), Weir (3)	
9 December 1876	(England) Cambridge University	H	3–0		
6 January 1877	Clydesdale	A	1–0		
