= 1872–73 Queen's Park F.C. season =

Queen's Park
1872–73 season
- Stadium: South Side Park
- FA Cup: Semi-finals
Home colours

The 1872–73 season was the second season of competitive football by Queen's Park.

== Overview ==
Queen's Park again entered the FA Cup in 1872–73. This was the only season the FA Cup was a true "challenge" cup. The defending champions were given a bye to the final with the remaining teams facing off against one another to determine who should challenge them for the trophy.

In order to reduce travel, Queen's Park were given byes through to the semi-finals where they were due to face Oxford University for the right to face defending champions Wanderers in the final. However, they withdrew before the match and Oxford University were given a walkover.

During the club's early years, the team would play in dark blue shirts and grey shorts. The now traditional black and white hoops weren't introduced until October 1873.

== Results ==
=== FA Cup ===
Date	Round	Opponents	H / A	Result F–A	Scorers	Attendance
October 1872	First round	Bye				
November 1872	Second round	Bye				
December 1872	Third round	Bye				
February 1873	Quarter-final	Bye				
March 1873	Semi-final	(England) Oxford University	N	Walkover		

Notes

1. A-Queen's Park withdrew from the competition ahead of their semi-final with Oxford University.

=== Friendlies ===
Date	Opponents	H / A	Result F–A	Scorers	Attendance
28 August 1872	Airdrie	H	6–0	Thomson, Ker (2), Weir, W. MacKinnon (2)	
19 October 1872	Granville	H	4–0	Leckie, Wotherspoon, Rhind (2)	
1 March 1873	Vale of Leven	A	1–0		1,500
5 April 1873	Glasgow Wanderers	H	1–0	Gardner	1,000
