= 1871–72 Queen's Park F.C. season =

Queen's Park
1871–72 season
- FA Cup: Semi-finals
Home colours

The 1871–72 season was the first season of competitive football by Queen's Park.

== Overview ==
Queen's Park were one of 14 teams to enter the first edition of the FA Cup in 1871–72. The club would go on to reach the semi-finals without playing a match due to a combination of an inability to agree on a venue, opponents withdrawing from the competition and byes. After drawing with Wanderers at a neutral venue in London, Queen's were forced to withdraw as they could not afford to return to London for a replay.

During the club's early years, the team would play in dark blue shirts, grey shorts and black socks. The now traditional black and white hoops weren't introduced until October 1873.

== Results ==
=== FA Cup ===
| Date | Round | Opponents | H / A | Result F–A | Scorers | Attendance |
|---|---|---|---|---|---|---|
| November 1871 | First round | (England) Donington School | H | Not played | | |
| December 1871 | Second round | (England) Donington School | Walkover | | | |
| January 1872 | Quarter-final | Bye | | | | |
| 5 March 1872 | Semi-final | (England) Wanderers | N | 0–0 | | |
| March 1872 | Semi-final replay | (England) Wanderers | N | Walkover | | |

Notes

1. A-As Queen's Park and Donington School were unable to agree on a mutually acceptable date for the game, they were both allowed to progress to the second round without playing.
2. B-Donington School withdrew from the competition after they were drawn to face Queen's Park in the second round.
3. C-Queen's Park withdrew from the competition after their semi-final draw with Wanderers as they could not afford to return to London for a replay.

=== Friendly ===
| Date | Opponents | H / A | Result F–A | Scorers | Attendance |
|---|---|---|---|---|---|
| 7 October 1871 | Granville | H | 1–0 | | |

== Squad statistics ==
| Name | FA Cup | |
| Name | Apps | Goals |
|---|---|---|
| R. Gardener | 1 | 0 |
| R. Edmiston | 1 | 0 |
| J. Hepburn | 1 | 0 |
| William Ker | 1 | 0 |
| Robert Leckie | 1 | 0 |
| James Smith | 1 | 0 |
| Robert Smith | 1 | 0 |
| Joseph Taylor | 1 | 0 |
| J. Walker | 1 | 0 |
| David Wotherspoon | 1 | 0 |
| Jerry Weir | 1 | 0 |
