= 1875–76 Scottish Cup =

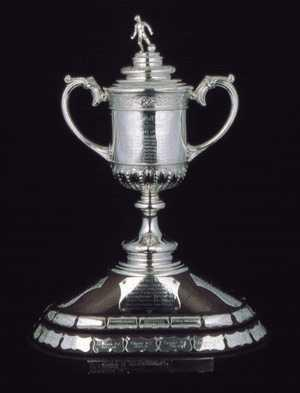
- The Scottish Cup trophy

Tournament details
- Country: Scotland
- Teams: 49

Final positions
- Champions: Queen's Park (third title)
- Runners-up: 3rd Lanark RV

Tournament statistics
- Matches played: 59
- Goals scored: 137 (2.32 per match)

The 1875–76 Scottish Cup – officially the Scottish Football Association Challenge Cup – was the third edition of Scotland's most prestigious football knockout competition. The number of entrants nearly doubled from the previous season with 49 teams included in the first round draw. The competition began on 2 October 1875 and concluded with the final replay on 18 March 1876. This was the first season that teams would change ends only at half time, the tradition of changing ends after a goal had been scored came to an end.

The cup was won for the third time by Queen's Park who defeated fellow Glasgow club 3rd Lanark RV 2–0 in the replayed final.

== Format ==
As with the previous competitions, the third edition of the Scottish Cup took on the format of a traditional knockout tournament. For the earlier rounds, the names of competing teams were placed into lots according to their districts and drawn into pairs. The home team for each tie was determined by the toss of a coin unless it was mutually agreed or only one of the two clubs drawn against one another had a private ground. In the event of a draw, the team who lost the toss would have the choice of ground for the replay. A similar procedure was used for subsequent rounds however, any club which had received a bye in the previous round would first be drawn against one of the winners of the previous round. The names of winning teams were placed into one lot for later rounds. The choice of venue for the final matches was reserved to the Scottish Football Association.

=== Calendar ===
1875–76 Scottish Cup calendar
Round	First match date	Fixtures			Clubs
Round	First match date	Original	Byes	Replays	Clubs
First round	2 October 1875	24	1	7	49 → 28
Second round	30 October 1875	14	0	2	28 → 14
Third round	27 November 1875	7	0	0	14 → 7
Quarter-finals	18 December 1875	3	1	0	7 → 4
Semi-finals	9 January 1876	2	0	2	4 → 2
Final	11 March 1876	1	0	1	2 → 1

- Six teams qualified for the second round after drawing their first round replays

== Teams ==
All 49 teams entered the competition in the first round.

Competing teams arranged by district
Ayrshire	Dunbartonshire	Edinburgh	Glasgow and Suburbs			Lanarkshire	Renfrewshire
Ardrossan; Ayr Eglinton; Ayr Thistle; Kilbirnie; Kilmarnock; Mauchline	Alclutha; Dumbarton; Helensburgh; Lennox; Renton; Star of Leven; Vale of Leven; Vale of Leven Rovers (Alexandria)	Edinburgh Thistle; Heart of Midlothian; 3rd Edinburgh RV	Alexandra Athletic; Caledonian; Clydesdale; Dumbreck; Eastern; Havelock; Lancelot; Northern	Oxford; Partick; Queen's Park; Queen's Park Juniors; Ramblers; Renton Thistle; Rovers	St Andrew's; Telegraphists; Towerhill; Vale of Leven Rovers (Glasgow); West End; Western; 3rd Lanark RV	Airdrie; Arthurlie; Barrhead; Drumpellier; Hamilton; Levern; Rangers; 1st Lanark RV	Sandyford; 23rd Renfrew RV

== First round ==
=== Edinburgh district ===
Edinburgh Thistle received a bye to the second round.

Edinburgh district first round result
Date	Home team	Score	Away team	Venue
16 October 1875	Heart of Midlothian	0–0	3rd Edinburgh RV	The Meadows, Edinburgh

Edinburgh district first round replay
Date	Home team	Score	Away team	Venue
23 October 1875	3rd Edinburgh RV	0–0 (Note: The six clubs involved in drawn replays advanced to the second round.)	Heart of Midlothian	The Meadows, Edinburgh

=== Dunbartonshire district ===
Dunbartonshire district first round results
Date	Home team	Score	Away team	Venue
9 October 1875	Lennox	2–2	Dumbarton	Levengrove Park, Dumbarton
16 October 1875	Alclutha	0–1	Renton	Barloan Toll, Dumbarton
16 October 1875	Helensburgh	1–0	Star of Leven	Ardenconnel Park, Helensburgh
	Vale of Leven Rovers (Alexandria)	w/o (Note: Vale of Leven Rovers scratched and Vale of Leven advanced to the second round.)	Vale of Leven	

Dunbartonshire district first round replay
Date	Home team	Score	Away team	Venue
16 October 1875	Dumbarton	1–0	Lennox	Lowmans Road, Dumbarton

=== Glasgow and Suburbs ===
Glasgow and Suburbs first round results
Date	Home team	Score	Away team	Venue
2 October 1875	Partick	1–1	West End	Inchview, Partick
16 October 1875	Clydesdale	1–0	Eastern	Kinning Park, Kinning Park
16 October 1875	3rd Lanark RV	2–0	Havelock	Cathkin Park, Crosshill
16 October 1875	Towerhill	2–0	Lancelot	Mosefield Park, Glasgow
16 October 1875	Northern	4–0	Ramblers	Hyde Park, Glasgow
16 October 1875	Queen's Park	3–0	Alexandra Athletic	Hampden Park, Crosshill
16 October 1875	St Andrew's	3–0	Telegraphists	Glasgow Green, Glasgow
23 October 1875	Caledonian	0–0	Western	Burnbank Park, Glasgow
	Queen's Park Juniors	w/o (Note: Queen's Park Juniors scratched and Renton Thistle advanced to the second round.)	Renton Thistle	
	Dumbreck	w/o (Note: Vale of Leven Rovers scratched and Dumbreck advanced to the second round.)	Vale of Leven Rovers (Glasgow)	
	Rovers	w/o (Note: Oxford scratched and Rovers advanced to the second round.)	Oxford	

Glasgow and Suburbs first round replays
Date	Home team	Score	Away team	Venue
16 October 1875	West End	1–1	Partick	Burnbank Park, Glasgow
30 October 1875	Western	3–0	Caledonian	Holyrood Park, Glasgow

=== Renfrewshire district ===
Renfrewshire district first round result
Date	Home team	Score	Away team	Venue
9 October 1875	23 Renfrew RV	0–0	Sandyford	Muirend Park, Cathcart

Renfrewshire district first round replay
Date	Home team	Score	Away team	Venue
16 October 1875	Sandyford	0–0	23 Renfrew RV	Kelvinbank Park, Govan

=== Lanarkshire district ===
Lanarkshire district first round results
Date	Home team	Score	Away team	Venue
9 October 1875	Arthurlie	0–0	Levern	Arthurlie Cross, Barrhead
16 October 1875	Rangers	7–0	1st Lanark RV	Burnbank Park, Glasgow
16 October 1875	Hamilton	0–0	Airdrie	South Avenue, Hamilton
16 October 1875	Drumpellier	0–0	Barrhead	Drumpellier Cricket Ground, Coatbridge

Lanarkshire district first round replays
Date	Home team	Score	Away team	Venue
16 October 1875	Levern	4–0	Arthurlie	Wellington Park, Hurlet
23 October 1875	Barrhead	0–1	Drumpellier	Beacon's Field, Barrhead
23 October 1875	Airdrie	0–1	Hamilton	Academy Park, Airdrie

=== Ayrshire district ===
Kilmarnock's 8–0 win over Ayr Eglinton set a new record for both the highest-scoring game and the biggest win in the competition.

Ayrshire district first round results
Date	Home team	Score	Away team	Venue
9 October 1875	Kilmarnock	8–0	Ayr Eglinton	The Grange, Kilmarnock
16 October 1875	Kilbrinie	1–0	Ayr Thistle	Stonyholm Park, Kilbirnie
	Ardrossan	w/o (Note: Ardrossan scratched and Mauchline advanced to the second round.)	Mauchline	

== Second round ==
=== Lanarkshire district ===
Lanarkshire district second round result
Date	Home team	Score	Away team	Venue
13 November 1875	Levern	3–0	Hamilton	Wellington Park, Hurlet

=== Edinburgh district ===
Edinburgh district second round results
Date	Home team	Score	Away team	Venue
30 October 1875	Drumpellier	2–0	Heart of Midlothian	Drumpellier Cricket Ground, Coatbridge
6 November 1875	Edinburgh Thistle	0–0 (abandoned) (Note: Edinburgh Thistle vs. 3rd Edinburgh RV was abandoned after 65 minutes due to rain. As no goals had been scored, a replay was ordered.)	3rd Edinburgh RV	East Meadows, Edinburgh

Edinburgh district second round replay
Date	Home team	Score	Away team	Venue
13 November 1875	3rd Edinburgh RV	1–0	Edinburgh Thistle	East Meadows, Edinburgh

=== Ayrshire district ===
Ayrshire district second round result
Date	Home team	Score	Away team	Venue
6 November 1875	Kilbirnie	0–0	Mauchline	Stonyholm Park, Kilbirnie

Ayrshire district second round replay
Date	Home team	Score	Away team	Venue
	Mauchline	w/o (Note: Kilbirnie scratched and Mauchline advanced to the third round.)	Kilbirnie	

=== Glasgow and Suburbs ===
Glasgow and Suburbs second round results
Date	Home team	Score	Away team	Venue
30 October 1875	3rd Lanark RV	0–1 (void) (Note: 3rd Lanark RV protested the result after Rangers kicked-off in both halves. The match was declared void and replayed two weeks later.)	Rangers	Cathkin Park, Crosshill
6 November 1875	Clydesdale	6–0	Kilmarnock	Kinning Park, Kinning Park
6 November 1875	Dumbreck	2–0	St Andrew's	Ibroxhill, Govan
6 November 1875	Partick	2–0	Towerhill	Inchview, Partick
6 November 1875	Queen's Park	5–0	Northern	Hampden Park, Crosshill
6 November 1875	West End	0–6	Rovers	Burnbank Park, Glasgow
6 November 1875	Western	3–0	Sandyford	Holyrood Park, Glasgow

Glasgow and Suburbs second round replay
Date	Home team	Score	Away team	Venue
13 November 1875	Rangers	1–2 (Note: Rangers vs. 3rd Lanark RV was abandoned after 83 minutes due to darkness. The result was allowed to stand.)	3rd Lanark RV	Burnbank Park, Glasgow

=== Dunbartonshire district ===
Dunbartonshire district second round results
Date	Home team	Score	Away team	Venue
6 November 1875	Dumbarton	2–1	Renton Thistle	Broomfauld Park, Dumbarton
13 November 1875	Vale of Leven	3–0	Renton	North Street Park, Alexandria

=== Renfrewshire district ===
Renfrewshire district second round result
Date	Home team	Score	Away team	Venue
13 November 1875	Helensburgh	1–0	23rd Renfrew RV	Ardenconnel Park, Helensburgh

== Third round ==
Third round results
Date	Home team	Score	Away team	Venue
27 November 1875	Dumbarton	5–1	Drumpellier	Lowmans Road, Dumbarton
27 November 1875	Levern	0–3	3rd Lanark RV	Wellington Park, Hurlet
27 November 1875	Mauchline	0–6	Vale of Leven	Cathkin Park, Crosshill (Note: Match played at a neutral venue.)
27 November 1875	Partick	0–5	Dumbreck	Inchview, Partick
27 November 1875	Queen's Park	2–0	Clydesdale	Hampden Park, Crosshill
27 November 1875	Rovers	4–0	3rd Edinburgh RV	Queen's Park, Glasgow
27 November 1875	Western	2–0	Helensburgh	Holyrood Park, Glasgow

== Quarter-finals ==
Dumbarton received a bye to the semi-finals.

Quarter-final results
Date	Home team	Score	Away team	Venue
18 December 1875	Queen's Park	2–0	Dumbreck	Hampden Park, Crosshill
18 December 1875	Vale of Leven	2–0	Rovers	North Street Park, Alexandria
18 December 1875	3rd Lanark RV	5–0	Western	Cathkin Park, Crosshill

== Semi-finals ==
Semi-final results
Date	Home team	Score	Away team	Venue
8 January 1876	Queen's Park	2–1	Vale of Leven	Hampden Park, Crosshill
8 January 1876	3rd Lanark RV	1–1	Dumbarton	Cathkin Park, Crosshill

Semi-final replay
Date	Home team	Score	Away team	Venue
15 January 1876	Dumbarton	1–1	3rd Lanark RV	Lowmans Road, Dumbarton

Semi-final second replay
Date	Home team	Score	Away team	Venue
22 January 1876	3rd Lanark RV	3–0	Dumbarton	Cathkin Park, Crosshill

== Final ==
11 March 1876
15:00

Queen's Park	1–1	3rd Lanark RV
Highet 35'		Drinnan 2'

Hamilton Crescent, Partick
Attendance: 10,000
Referee: A.S. McBride (Vale of Leven)

=== Replay ===
18 March 1876
15:00

Queen's Park	2–0	3rd Lanark RV
Highet 15', 46'

Hampden Park, Crosshill
Attendance: 6,000
Referee: A.S. McBride (Vale of Leven)

== See also ==
- 1875–76 in Scottish football
