= Helensburgh Football Club =

Helensburgh Football Club may refer to:

- Helensburgh F.C., association football club from Helensburgh, Dunbartonshire, Scotland, active between 1896 and 1928, formerly a member of the Scottish Football League
- Helensburgh F.C. (1874), association football club which was active between 1874 and 1882, and which once reached the Scottish Cup semi-final
- Helensburgh F.C. (1882), association football club known as Helensburgh Albion from 1882 to 1885, and Helensburgh from 1885 until its dissolution in 1886
