= William Browning =

William Browning may refer to:

- William A. Browning (1835–1866), private secretary of President Andrew Johnson
- William J. Browning (1850–1920), American politician
- William Browning (pianist) (1924–1997), American pianist
- William Docker Browning (1931–2008), U.S. federal judge
- William Browning (cricketer) (fl. 1795), English cricketer
- William Browning (footballer) (fl. 1933–1941), Scottish footballer
- Bill Browning (1931–1977), American bluegrass musician

== See also ==
- William Browning Spencer (born 1946), American writer
