= Hamilton Football Club (disambiguation) =

Hamilton Football Club may refer to:

- Hamilton Football Club, a former Australian rules football and netball club, merged into the Hamilton Kangaroos Football Club
- Hamilton Football Club, the original name of Hamilton Tigers (football), a former Canadian football club
- Hamilton Football Club, former full name of K–W United FC, a former Canadian association football club
- Hamilton F.C. (1874–78) (full name: Hamilton Football Club), a former Scottish association football club
