= Archibald Rowan =

Archibald Rowan may refer to:

- Archie Rowan (1855–1923), Scottish footballer
- Archibald Hamilton Rowan (1751–1834), founder of the Society of United Irishmen
