= Vale of Leven Rovers F.C. =

Vale of Leven Rovers F.C. or Vale of Leven Rovers Football Club may refer to:

- Vale of Leven Rovers F.C. (Alexandria), a defunct Scottish association football club from Alexandria that competed in the Scottish Cup between 1874 and 1878
- Vale of Leven Rovers F.C. (Glasgow), a defunct Scottish association football club from Glasgow that competed in the Scottish Cup between 1875 and 1876

== See also ==
- Vale of Leven F.C.
