= Standard F.C. =

Former association football club in Scotland

Standard
- Full name: Standard Football Club
- Founded: 1873
- Dissolved: 1876
- Ground: Mossdale Park
- Secretary: David McNair
- Captain: J. Mellis, J. Lennie
Home colours

Standard Football Club was a 19th-century football club based in Glasgow.

== History ==
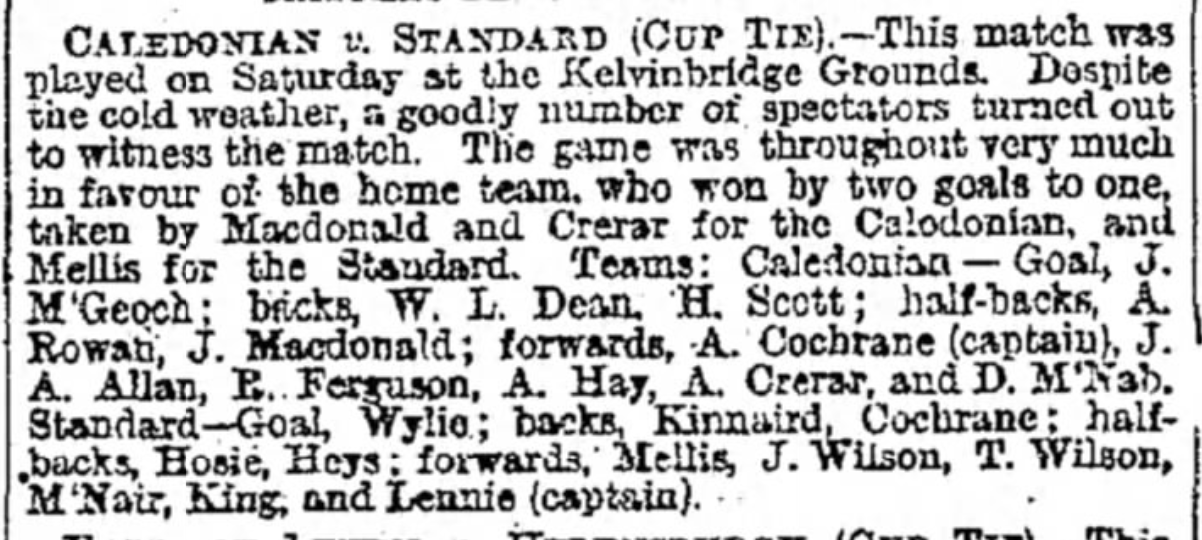
Match report of Caledonian v Standard, Scottish Cup 1st Round, 1876-77, from the Glasgow Herald, 2 October 1876

The club was formed in 1873, out of a cricket club (founded in 1863) based at Mossdale Park. In its first season the club claimed not to have conceded a goal, with 4 wins and 3 draws, scoring six goals in the process. One of the draws, on 28 February 1874, was against Rangers.

Perhaps buoyed by this season, the club entered the second edition of the Scottish Cup in 1874–75, and was the recipient of the first-ever bye in the tournament in the first round. In the second, the club was drawn away to the Third Lanarkshire Rifle Volunteers; after a 0–0 draw, in which the Standard goalkeeper "Mr Charleston executed his work in a very creditable manner", Standard lost the replay at home 2–0. Over the season, the club played 17 matches, with a record of 5 wins, 7 draws, and 5 defeats, scoring just 7 goals, but only conceding 11.

By 1875–76 the club had been overtaken by the plethora of other clubs starting up; it did not win a match during the season, drawing twice and losing four times. The club lost 2–1 in the first round of the Scottish Cup at fellow Glaswegian side Caledonian in 1876–77, despite having taken the lead, and it does not leave any further record afterwards.

== Colours ==
The club played in blue jerseys, white knickerbockers, and blue and white hooped stockings.

== Grounds ==
The club played its first two seasons at its cricket ground at Mossdale Park, and its final season at Shawlands Park.
