= Helensburgh F.C. (1882) =

Former association football club in Scotland

Helensburgh
- Full name: Helensburgh
- Founded: 1882
- Dissolved: 1886
- Ground: Range Park, Mossend
- Hon. Secretary: Thomas Robinson
- Match Secretary: James M'Innes
- Captain: A. Hutchison
Home colours

Helensburgh F.C. was a nineteenth-century association football club from Helensburgh in Dunbartonshire, Scotland.

== History ==
The first record of the club is as Helensburgh Athletic, playing against the Star of Leven 2nd XI in March 1882. In the aftermath of the demise of the two previous senior clubs in the town, Helensburgh and Victoria, the club kept a low profile, although it did take part in the first Dumbartonshire Cup in 1884, losing 10–1 to the quasi-professional Dumbarton in its first tie. The club changed its name to the simpler Helensburgh in early August 1885, having entered a pre-season tournament as Helensburgh Athletic, but playing in it as Helensburgh.

In August 1885, with club membership having risen to a respectable 70, Helensburgh joined the Scottish Football Association. In effect the club merged with another club in town, Helensburgh Albion, as two of the players in the 1885–86 Scottish Cup tie with Dumbarton Athletic - back D. Campbell and captain Hutchison - had been Albion players.

Its first (and only) Scottish Cup tie in September, against Dumbarton Athletic, was suffused with confusion. The tie did not take place, voided by the referee on the basis of "mismanagement" by Helensburgh. The referee had assessed that the goal-posts were too high, which led to protest and counter-protest; Helensburgh about the non-registration of a number of Athletic players, Athletic that it should be awarded the tie as the pitch was not in a proper state. The FA ruled that the match should be played out at Mossend, and the visitors went into a 2–0 half-time lead, but Helensburgh nearly pulled the scores level, only to be caught by a sucker punch break at the end to go down 3–2.

The club never took part in the Scottish Cup again, not renewing its subscription the next August. The gap between the club and the three big Dumbartonshire sides was demonstrated by it losing to Vale of Leven in the 1884–85 and 1885–86 Dumbartonshire Cups, by scores of 6–1 (Helensburgh taking the lead through a Connal goal) and 8–2; despite encouragement from the President of the Vale, who noted that "the mettle was in the Helensburgh", there is only one record of a Helensburgh club after 1886, a 2–0 defeat at Methlan Park in April 1887, which may refer to the Victoria junior club.

== Colours ==
The club wore blue jerseys and white knickers.

== Ground ==
The club originally played on a public park in Helensburgh. Requiring a private ground in order to become a senior club, Helensburgh rented Range Park in Mossend, ¼ mile from Helensburgh railway station, from late 1884.
