= Hamilton Gymnasium F.C. =

Former association football club in Scotland

Hamilton Gymnasium
- Full name: Hamilton Gymnasium Football Club
- Founded: 8 May 1866
- Dissolved: 1872
- Ground: Mr Munro's field
- Chairman: William Stratton

Hamilton Gymnasium Football Club was a 19th-century football club based in Hamilton, in South Lanarkshire, Scotland. It was the earliest-founded football club in Scotland to play under Association laws and the first to host Queen's Park F.C. in an association match.

== History ==
=== Foundation ===
On 8 May 1866, a public meeting was held in the Lesser Town Hall, Hamilton, at which a society was founded for "field sports, such as cricket, football, rounders, &c". The founders called their society the Hamilton Gymnasium.

As Hamilton lacked a public park, the Gymnasium members held a Christmas concert at the Town Hall on 15 December 1866 to raise funds, although one attendee "felt not a little pained to witness the low buffoonery displayed on the occasion". On 3 May 1869, the club was able to open a dedicated field, near the railway station, and tenanted by a Mr Munro, with a series of athletic events including foot-racing, cricket-ball throwing, and sack races; "croquet was also provided for the ladies".

=== First football match ===
The first match the club played against external opposition was at home to Queen's Park on 29 May 1869, the visitors winning "by four goals and nine touches down"; the clubs were using an outdated set of Association laws as counting touchdowns (a tiebreaker in the event of the goals being equal) was only in force from February 1866 to February 1867. This match was played as 15 per side, as at the time the Association laws did not have any provision as to the number of players. Queen's Park had the advantage of playing to tactics that had been developed in English association matches and via extensive training, its captain Robert Gardner distributing cards to the Park players indicating where they should play.

After the match, H.N. Smith of Queen's Park composed a poem of 21 stanzas, which was sent to the Gymnasium, "in order to stimulate and rouse them to better action in future."

=== Later matches ===
The clubs played a return game on 7 August 1869 at Queen's Park; this time the Gymnasium lost by only two goals.

The club continued to host athletic events and cricket matches, but the only other reported football matches were the "home and home" fixtures against Queen's Park in 1870–71. The game at Hamilton, which was another 15 per side match, took place on 24 September 1870, and ended in another victory for Queen's Park, by four goals to nil. The return at Queen's Park, on 29 October 1870, was played with 14 on the Queen's Park side and 18 on the Gymnasium side. Nevertheless, Queen's Park won again, by three goals to nothing.

=== End of the club ===
In 1871, the club applied to the town council for permission to occupy the rented field on a more permanent basis, because of the "considerable expense in erecting their apparatus, the removal of which to the field set apart by the Council for the purpose of recreation would cause greater outlay than the club could well afford". The council gave such permission.

However it appears that the ground was unsuitable for the club, and by 1872 it was looking to move to a field in Clydesdale Street, owned by a Mr Robb. There is no further record of the club, although two new clubs (Hamilton Academical and Hamilton F.C.) were founded in 1874, and the younger members of the Gymnasium club joined the Academical.

== Colours ==
There is no record of the club colours, and it is possible that the club did not have any formal colours, as its only recorded games were against Queen's Park, so its players may have worn anything which did not clash with the opposition's dark blue jerseys.

== Players ==
The identities of only four Gymnasium players have been recorded:

- Archibald Laidlaw (who played in the first game)
- James Mackie (former town chamberlain)
- James Cassells (honorary sheriff)
- ex-Bailie Small
