= 1877–78 Queen's Park F.C. season =

Queen's Park
1877–78 season
- Stadium: Hampden Park
- Scottish Cup: Quarter-finals
- FA Cup: Second round
- Glasgow Merchants Charity Cup: Winners

The 1877–78 season was the seventh season of competitive football by Queen's Park.

== Scottish Cup ==
Queen's Park played only four competitive fixtures in 1877–78 as they were knocked out of the Scottish Cup by eventual runners-up 3rd Lanark RV in the third round.

Date	Round	Opponents	H / A	Result F–A	Scorers	Attendance
29 September 1877	First round	Whiteinch	H	9–0		
20 October 1877	Second round	Clydesdale	A	2–0		
10 November 1877	Third round	3rd Lanark RV	A	0–1		

== FA Cup ==
Queen's Park received a bye through to the second round but they withdrew before their match with Welsh side Druids.

Date	Round	Opponents	H / A	Result F–A	Scorers	Attendance
November 1877	First round	Bye				
December 1877	Second round	(Wales) Druids	Walkover			

== Glasgow Merchants' Charity Cup ==
Originally, Queen's Park were due to play Rangers in the first round but instead advanced straight to the final while Rangers played 3rd Lanark RV instead. The club retained the cup after they defeated Vale of Leven in the final.

Date	Round	Opponents	H / A	Result F–A	Scorers	Attendance
4 May 1878	Final	Vale of Leven		1–0		

== Friendlies ==
Date	Opponents	H / A	Result F–A	Scorers	Attendance
6 October 1877	(Wales) Druids	H	3–0		
17 November 1877	(England) Notts County	H	6–1		
15 December 1877	(England) Cambridge University	H	0–0		
19 January 1878	(England) Notts County	A	2–1		
6 April 1878	(England) Manchester Birch	A	6–0		
