= Alpha F.C. =

Former association football club in Scotland

Alpha
- Full name: Alpha F.C.
- Founded: 1881
- Dissolved: 1886
- Ground: Roman Road Park
- Chairman: John Anderson
- Match Secretary: James S. Ferguson
Home colours

Alpha Football Club was an association football club from Motherwell, Lanarkshire, that was the ancestor club of Motherwell Football Club.

== History ==
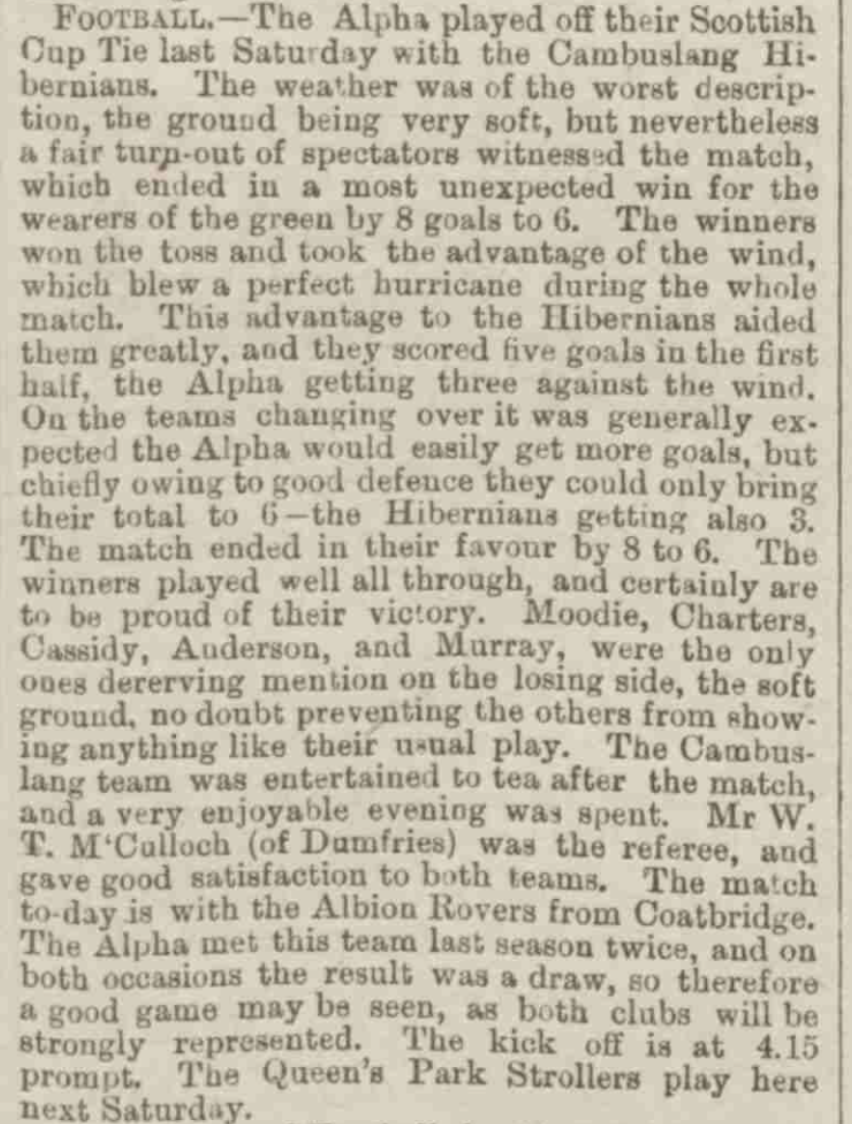
1885–86 Scottish Cup 1st Round, Alpha 6–8 Cambuslang Hibernians, Motherwell Times, 19 September 1885

The club was formed in 1881 as the works side of the Alpha Steam Crane and Engine Works. The media sometimes referred to the club as Motherwell Alpha.

Alpha's first competitive football came in the 1883–84 Lanarkshire Cup, and, thanks to two wins and a bye, reached the semi-final. Alpha lost 4–0 at the more experienced Cambuslang, who scored 3 goals in the final 10 minutes, and who beat Dykehead in the final by the same score.

The club entered the Lanarkshire again in the following season, "unexpectedly" beating Hamilton Academical 5–2, but losing to Dykehead in the quarter-final.

In August 1885, Alpha turned senior by joining the Scottish Football Association, and entered the 1885–86 Scottish Cup. It played Cambuslang Hibernians at home in the first round, and the match was a 14-goal thriller, the visitors winning through 8–6.

There was a chance for Alpha to gain revenge on the town in the Lanarkshire Cup, as Cambuslang was drawn to visit Motherwell, but again the visitors scored 8 - this time however Alpha only scoring 1, against the side that would go on to reach the Scottish Cup final two years later.

On 17 May 1886, the club held a meeting in Mrs Baillie's pub in Merry Street, and decided to break up the Alpha and form a new club, to be called Motherwell Football Club. The resulting club, which included members of the Glencairn works side, retained James Ferguson as secretary and Roman Road as its ground, and was considered more a continuation of Alpha.

The Alpha still had to play out the season, which included the latter stages of the first Motherwell Charity Cup; there was not much charity shown in the semi-final with Wishaw Swifts, which included a protested match and one match abandoned because of fighting. Wishaw Swifts scratched, and Alpha's very last match was a 5–1 defeat to Royal Albert in the final.

== Colours ==
The club wore navy blue jerseys and hose, and white knickers.

== Ground ==
The club first played on a field behind Baillie's Square on Merry Street, but in March 1885 moved into Roman Road Park, 400 yards from Motherwell railway station, which ultimately offered "the finest piece of turf in the shire". The move allowed the club to rent out its former ground for grazing purposes.

The first game at the new ground was a 2–2 draw with Hamilton Academical on 7 March, some spectators taking issue with the timekeeping, as the referee insisted that the Acas' equalizer came when the game "wanted a few seconds of being finished". The rent was £18 per year, and one problem the club had was the ease with which trespassers could sneak into the ground without paying, by climbing over the meagre fencing.

== Notable players ==
- James "Skinner" Cassidy, who played for Alpha on its foundation, and later for Everton
