= Highett =

Highett may refer to:

- Highett, Victoria, Australia
  - Highett railway station
- William Highett (1807–1880), Australian politician
- Highett Football Club, Australian-rules football club in Highett, Melbourne, Victoria, Australia

== See also ==
- Highet
- Highest (disambiguation)
