= John Highet =

Scottish footballer

Personal information
- Full name: John James Inglis Highet
- Date of birth: 3 July 1886
- Place of birth: Govan, Scotland
- Date of death: 3 May 1950 (aged 63)
- Place of death: Ayr, Scotland
- Position: Outside right

Senior career*
Years	Team	Apps	(Gls)
1906–1908	Queen's Park	1	(0)
1910–????	Rangers	0	(0)
–1911	Ayr United	0	(0)
- * Club domestic league appearances and goals

John James Inglis Highet (3 July 1886 – 3 May 1950) was a Scottish amateur footballer who played as an outside right in the Scottish League for Queen's Park.

== Personal life ==
Highet's father was Scottish international footballer Thomas Highet. He served as a second lieutenant in the Machine Gun Corps during the First World War.

== Career statistics ==
Appearances and goals by club, season and competition
Club	Season	League			Scottish Cup		Total	
Club	Season	Division	Apps	Goals	Apps	Goals	Apps	Goals
Queen's Park	1906–07	Scottish First Division	1	0	0	0	1	0
Career total			1	0	0	0	1	0
