= Archie Rowan =

Scottish footballer

Personal information
- Full name: Archibald Rowan
- Date of birth: 4 October 1855
- Date of death: 14 November 1923 (aged 68)
- Position: Goalkeeper

Senior career*
Years	Team	Apps	(Gls)
- Caledonian F.C. (Glasgow)
- Third Lanark
- Queen's Park

International career
1880–1882	Scotland	2	(0)
- * Club domestic league appearances and goals

Archibald Rowan (4 October 1855 – 14 November 1923) was a Scottish footballer who played as a goalkeeper.

== Career ==
Rowan was born on 4 October 1855. He played club football for Caledonian, Third Lanark and Queen's Park, and made two appearances for Scotland. He sometimes played under the pseudonym "A. McCallum", including in major finals.

He later served on the committee at Queen's Park, and was elected president once and chairman twice. Rowan was also a cricketer (playing for the Caledonian Cricket Club and the West of Scotland Cricket Club) golfer and billiard player. He died on 14 November 1923.

== See also ==
- List of Scotland national football team captains
