= Sam McCappin =

English footballer

Personal information
- Full name: Samuel Alfred McCappin
- Date of birth: 10 August 1875
- Place of birth: Kilburn, London, England
- Date of death: 1945 (aged 72–73)
- Position: Goalkeeper

Senior career*
Years	Team	Apps	(Gls)
1893–1894	Barking Excelsior		
1894–1895	St Luke's (Canning Town)		
1895–1896	Barking Woodville		
1896–1899	Ilford		
1899–1900	Notts County	7	(0)
Total		7	(0)
- * Club domestic league appearances and goals

Samuel Alfred McCappin (10 August 1875 – 1945) was an English footballer who played in the Football League for Notts County.
