= Vale of Leven Rovers F.C. (Glasgow) =

Association football club in Glasgow City, Scotland

Vale of Leven Rovers
- Full name: Vale of Leven Rovers Football Club (Glasgow)
- Founded: 1874
- Dissolved: 1876
- Ground: Glasgow Green
- Secretary: D. M'Allister
- Captain: James Cunningham

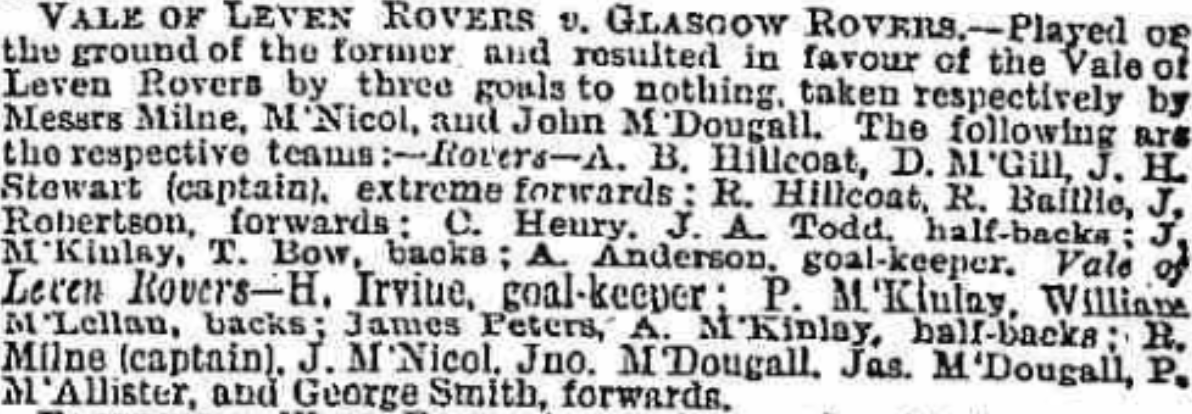
Report and teams of a friendly association football match, Vale of Leven Rovers v Rovers, The Scotsman, 9 November 1874

Vale of Leven Rovers Football Club was a short-lived Scottish association football club based in the city of Glasgow.

== History ==
The club was founded in 1874. It entered the Scottish Cup in 1874–75 for the first time, and lost at Kilmarnock in the first round, The XI which faced the Ayrshire side was:

W. M'Lellan, goal; P. M'Kinley and P. Docherty, backs; J. M'Nicol and A. M'Kinley, half-backs; R. Milne (captain), H. Irvine, J. M'Allister, P. M'Allister, J. M'Dougall, and G. Smith, forwards.

The club entered again the following season, and was drawn to face Dumbreck in the first round, but scratched. There is no further record of the club - a requirement for clubs to have their own grounds meant that the Rovers, who played on public grounds, could not retain membership of the Scottish Football Association.

There are references to a Glaswegian Vale of Leven Rovers in 1887 and 1892, but these almost certainly relate to different clubs, as there is no record of the Vale of Leven Rovers (Glasgow) between 1876 and 1887.

== Ground ==
The club played its home matches on Glasgow Green.
