= Rovers F.C. (Glasgow) =

Association football club in Glasgow City, Scotland

Rovers
- Full name: Rovers Football Club
- Founded: 22 April 1873
- Dissolved: 1878
- Ground: Queen's Park
- President: Robert Murdoch
- Match Secretary: James Bell, C. R. Riddell
Home colours

Rovers Football Club was a 19th-century football club based in Glasgow.

== History ==
The club was founded on 22 April 1873. The club may have emerged from a rugby club known as Queen's Park Rovers which is recorded to have had a fixture at the start of the year. It was very active in its first season of football, claiming 10 wins from 19 games.

Rovers was one of the original 16 teams to participate in the inaugural season of the Scottish Cup, although it was considered in the second rank of sides, only being considered fit opposition in friendlies for the Eastern F.C. second XI. However the club did have one achievement in February 1874 by beating the second XI of Queen's Park 1–0, at the First Hampden Park. It was the first time that any Queen's Park side had ever conceded a goal, let alone lost a match, and came after its first and second elevens had played a combined total of 97 matches.

It took part in Scottish Cup tournaments between 1873–74 and 1877–78, reaching the quarter-finals on two occasions. The first time the club reached the last eight was in 1874–75, and it did so without playing a match in the tournament - accepting a walkover from Hamilton F.C. in the first round and receiving a bye in the second round, before scratching to eventual winner Queen's Park.

The following season the club reached the quarter-finals - that season, the final seven - on merit, with wins over the Glasgow side West End and the 3rd Edinburgh Rifle Volunteers F.C., but losing to Vale of Leven; the game at Alexandria ended early because of bad light but Rovers agreed that the result should stand.

In 1877, the club took over the Winton club of Mount Florida. However the club does not seem to have survived the season, with Winton reforming as Apsley; in its final season, its membership had dropped to 40, making it one of the smaller sides in Glasgow.

Rovers F.C. should not be confused with other Scottish teams of the same name, such as Rovers F.C. (1872–1882) in Edinburgh, or Rovers F.C. (1888–1889) in the Scottish Highlands.

== Colours ==
The club originally played in blue jerseys with a white cross, white knickerbockers, and blue stockings, supplied by Forsyths of Renfield Street. It is not known whether the cross was a Maltese cross, which was a popular design on football jerseys at the time, or a saltire. In 1877 it changed its stockings to blue and white.

== Grounds ==
The club played at the following grounds:

- 1873–75: South Side Park/Queen's Park, Glasgow
- 1875–76: Lorne Park, also the home of Ramblers
- 1876–78: Victoria Road, Glasgow
