= Alex Highet =

Scottish footballer

Personal information
- Full name: Alexander Galt Highet
- Date of birth: c. 1914
- Place of birth: Glasgow, Scotland
- Date of death: 14 October 1940 (aged 26)
- Place of death: HMT Lord Stamp, English Channel, off Isle of Portland, England
- Position: Left back

Senior career*
Years	Team	Apps	(Gls)
1938	Queen's Park	1	(0)
- * Club domestic league appearances and goals

Alexander Galt Highet (c. 1914 – 14 October 1940) was a Scottish amateur footballer who made one appearance in the Scottish League for Queen's Park as a left back.

== Personal life ==
Highet served as an able seaman in the Royal Naval Volunteer Reserve during the Second World War. He was killed in the English Channel when HMT Lord Stamp hit a naval mine on 14 October 1940. Highet is commemorated on the Portsmouth Naval Memorial.

== Career statistics ==
Appearances and goals by club, season and competition
Club	Season	League			National Cup		Total	
Club	Season	Division	Apps	Goals	Apps	Goals	Apps	Goals
Queen's Park	1937–38	Scottish First Division	1	0	0	0	1	0
Career total			1	0	0	0	1	0
