= Havelock F.C. =

Former association football club in Scotland

Havelock
- Full name: Havelock Football Club
- Founded: 1873
- Dissolved: 1880
- Ground: Middleton Park
- Secretary: James Ingram, Andrew Turnbull
Home colours

Havelock Football Club was a 19th-century Scottish association football club based in Govan, now in Glasgow.

== History ==
The club was founded in 1873 and had 30 members in its first season, winning 5 of its 12 matches. Havelock was formed from a cricket club which seems to have been founded in the same year and which played at the same ground.

Havelock's first recorded matches were a pair of fixtures with the short-lived Ibrox club, which also used Middleton Park.

The Havelock was not a successful club. It entered the Scottish Cup every season from 1875–76 to 1879–80 and only won one tie. It was unlucky in its first entry to draw the 3rd Lanarkshire Rifle Volunteers in the first round, who went on to reach the final, and Havelock only went down 2–0, despite being under near constant pressure, the second goal coming at the end of the match.

Havelock did gain an unexpected 1–0 win against the Thirds in a friendly in March 1877, which brought out a large crowd to Kinning Park the following week for a friendly with Rangers; normal service was resumed as the home side won 8–0, the Havelock being "rather deficient in passing".

The club's sole win in the Scottish Cup came a few months later, 6–0 against Craig Park, although the match went unreported, suggesting the club secretary had not sent a report in to the newspapers. In the second round, South Western beat Havelock 2–0 in a "very fast" replay.

Havelock's final entry in 1879–80 saw the club gain a walkover in the first round, as the 4th R.R.V. scratched. In the second round, the club was drawn to play at the original Partick club, and turned up to the tie with only ten men; although the eleventh player turned up during the first half, Havelock was 3–1 down at half-time, and there was no further scoring in the match. There is also no further record of the club.

== Colours ==
The club's colours were black and white 2-inch "stripes", which in the context of the time referred to hoops.

== Ground ==
The club played at West Middleton Park in Glasgow, half-a-mile from to Paisley Road Toll.
