= 1874–75 Scottish Cup =

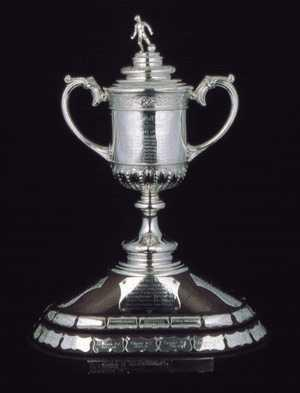
- The Scottish Cup trophy

Tournament details
- Country: Scotland
- Teams: 25

Final positions
- Champions: Queen's Park (second title)
- Runners-up: Renton

Tournament statistics
- Matches played: 29
- Goals scored: 57 (1.97 per match)

The 1874–75 Scottish Cup – officially the Scottish Football Association Challenge Cup – was the second edition of Scotland's most prestigious football knockout competition. Teams from Edinburgh, Renfrewshire and Lanarkshire entered the competition for the first time and with 12 new teams entering the competition, a total of 25 were included in the first round draw. The competition began with the first round match between Rangers and Oxford on 10 October 1874 and concluded with the final on 10 April 1875. After 27 matches and 56 goals scored, defending champions Queen's Park retained the trophy by defeating Dunbartonshire club Renton 3–0 at the original Hampden Park in the final.

== Format ==
As with the inaugural competition, the second edition of the Scottish Cup took on the format of a traditional knockout tournament, however, an odd number of teams entering the competition necessitated the introduction of byes for the first time.

For the earlier rounds, the names of competing teams were placed into lots according to their districts and drawn into pairs. The home team for each tie was determined by the toss of a coin unless it was mutually agreed or only one of the two clubs drawn against one another had a private ground. In the event of a draw, the team who lost the toss would have the choice of ground for the replay. A similar procedure was used for subsequent rounds however, any club which had received a bye in the previous round would first be drawn against one of the winners of the previous round. The names of winning teams were placed into one lot for later rounds. The choice of venue for the final matches was reserved to the Scottish Football Association.

=== Rules ===
Like the inaugural competition, matches were played according to the rules of The Football Association, known as the Laws of the Game. Pitches could be no more than 200 yards by 100 yards and goals were marked by two upright posts at either end, 8 yards apart, with tape between them at 8 ft high. A coin toss decided the ends each team would shoot towards and which team kicked off. A goal was scored when the ball passed between the posts below the tape and ends were changed after each goal was scored. Players were considered "out of play" if they were nearer to the goal than their teammate when they kicked the ball unless there were at least three of their opponents between them and their own goal. Players who were out of play could not touch the ball or prevent any other players from doing so until they were back in play. The rules specifically forbade players from kicking and hacking their opponents as well as from wearing "projecting nails, iron plates or gutta percha" on the soles of their boots.

=== Teams ===
All 25 teams entered the competition in the first round.

Competing teams arranged by county
Ayrshire	Dunbartonshire	Edinburgh	Glasgow		Lanarkshire	Renfrewshire
Kilmarnock	Dumbarton; Helensburgh; Renton; Star of Leven; Vale of Leven	3rd Edinburgh RV	Alexandra Athletic; Blythswood; Clydesdale; Dumbreck; Eastern; Oxford; Queen's Park	Standard; Rangers; Rovers; Vale of Leven Rovers; West End; Western; 3rd Lanark RV; 23rd Renfrew RV	Hamilton	Arthurlie; Barrhead

=== Calendar ===
1874–75 Scottish Cup calendar
Round	First match date	Fixtures			Clubs
Round	First match date	Original	Byes	Replays	Clubs
First round	10 October 1874	12	1	1	25 → 13
Second round	21 November 1874	6	1	1	13 → 7
Quarter-finals	19 December 1874	3	1	0	7 → 4
Semi-finals	20 March 1875	2	0	3	4 → 2
Final	10 April 1875	1	0	0	2 → 1

== First round ==
Glasgow team Standard were the first team in the competition's history to receive a bye and advanced straight to the second round. The first round got underway on 10 October 1874 when Rangers and Oxford made their Scottish Cup debuts. Goals from McNeil and Gibb gave Rangers a 2–0 home win at Flesher's Haugh to see them through. Dumbarton and Kilmarnock recorded their first wins in the competition a week later while Helensburgh – who were also making their debut in the competition – defeated 3rd Edinburgh RV in a match played at a neutral venue in Glasgow. On the same day, Eastern secured their passage to the second round with a 3–0 win over 23rd Renfrew RV and the 3rd Lanark RV–Barrhead and Rovers–Hamilton ties both went to replays. The remaining matches were played on 24 October 1874. Holders Queen's Park defeated Western, Dumbreck won 5–1 against Alexandra Athletic, West End beat Star of Leven and 3rd Lanark RV won their replay against Barrhead. Before their match kicked off, Clydesdale protested against Ferguson, a professional runner, playing for Vale of Leven. The match ended 0–0 but Vale of Leven were disqualified before the replay. Hamilton's replay against Rovers ended 0–0 which meant a second replay was to be organised but Rovers advanced to the second round after Hamilton scratched. Blythswood also scratched from their tie with Renton.

First round results
Date	Home team	Score	Away team	Venue
10 October 1874	Rangers	2–0	Oxford	Flesher's Haugh, Glasgow
17 October 1874	Dumbarton	3–0	Arthurlie	Meadow Park, Dumbarton
17 October 1874	Eastern	3–0	23rd Renfrew RV	Dixon's Park, Glasgow
17 October 1874	Rovers	1–1	Hamilton	Queen's Park, Crosshill
17 October 1874	Helensburgh	3–0	3rd Edinburgh RV	Neutral venue, Glasgow (Note: Played at an unknown neutral venue.)
17 October 1874	Kilmarnock	4–0	Vale of Leven Rovers	The Grange, Kilmarnock
17 October 1874	3rd Lanark RV	0–0	Barrhead	Cathkin Park, Crosshill
24 October 1874	Clydesdale	0–0	Vale of Leven	Kinning Park, Kinning Park
24 October 1874	Dumbreck	5–1	Alexandra Athletic	Ibroxhill, Govan
24 October 1874	West End	3–0	Star of Leven	Burnbank Park, Glasgow
24 October 1874	Western	0–1	Queen's Park	Regent's Park, Glasgow
	Renton	w/o (Note: Blythswood scratched and Renton advanced to the second round.)	Blythswood	

First round replays
Date	Home team	Score	Away team	Venue
24 October 1874	3rd Lanark RV	1–0	Barrhead	Cathkin Park, Crosshill
24 October 1874	Hamilton	0–0	Rovers	South Avenue, Hamilton
	Clydesdale	w/o (Note: Vale of Leven were disqualified and Clydesdale advanced to the second round.)	Vale of Leven	

First round second replay
Date	Home team	Score	Away team	Venue
	Rovers	w/o (Note: Hamilton scratched and Rovers advanced to the second round.)	Hamilton	

== Second round ==
With 13 teams remaining in the competition, Rovers received a bye to the quarter-finals. Queen's Park's 7–0 win over West End was the highest-scoring game in the 1874–75 competition and equalled the record for the biggest win they themselves had set in the previous season. Renton overcame Helensburgh while Kilmarnock lost 3–0 at home to Eastern. Clydesdale defeated Dumbreck 1–0 but a successful protest from Drumbreck resulted in the SFA ordering the match to be replayed. It was almost two months before the replay took place and it ended in the same result as Clydesdale progressed. Dumbarton advanced to the quarter-finals after a replay despite a protest from Rangers over the only goal in the match. They claimed the ball had gone "over the tape" rather than under and the goal shouldn't count however the referee – who was a member of Dumbarton – allowed it. 3rd Lanark RV also advanced to the quarter-finals after overcoming Standard in a replay following goalless draws in the original matches.

Second round results
Date	Home team	Score	Away team	Venue
21 November 1874	3rd Lanark RV	0–0	Standard	Cathkin Park, Crosshill
21 November 1874	Clydesdale	1–0 (protested) (Note: A protest by Dumbreck was upheld and a replay was ordered.)	Dumbreck	Kinning Park, Kinning Park
21 November 1874	Kilmarnock	0–3	Eastern	The Grange, Kilmarnock
21 November 1874	Queen's Park	7–0	West End	Hampden Park, Crosshill
21 November 1874	Renton	2–0	Helensburgh	Public Park, Renton
28 November 1874	Rangers	0–0	Dumbarton	Flesher's Haugh, Glasgow

Second round replays
Date	Home team	Score	Away team	Venue
28 November 1874	Standard	0–2	3rd Lanark	Mossdale Park, Glasgow
12 December 1874	Dumbarton	1–0	Rangers	Meadow Park, Dumbarton
16 January 1875	Clydesdale	1–0	Dumbreck	Kinning Park, Kinning Park

== Quarter-finals ==
Only two matches were played in the quarter-finals after Rovers scratched their tie with Queen's Park and Clydesdale received a bye to the semi-finals. Both matches finished 1–0 to the home teams as Renton saw off Eastern on Boxing Day 1874 and Dumbarton defeated 3rd Lanark RV on 30 January 1875.

Quarter-final results
Date	Home team	Score	Away team	Venue
26 December 1874	Renton	1–0	Eastern	Public Park, Renton
30 January 1875	Dumbarton	1–0	3rd Lanark RV	Meadow Park, Dumbarton
	Queen's Park	w/o (Note: Rovers scratched and Queen's Park advanced to the semi-finals.)	Rovers	

== Semi-finals ==
The two semi-finals produced a total of four replays between them. Renton had defeated Dumbarton 1–0 in the original fixture on 6 March 1875 but a protest from Dumbarton over a disputed goal saw a replay ordered. The replay, three weeks later, ended 1–1 at a neutral venue in Alexandria before Renton won the third match on 3 April. The other semi-final saw old rivals Queen's Park and Clydesdale face off in a replay of the previous season's final. A goalless draw at Kinning Park was followed by a 2–2 draw at Hampden Park before Queen's edged the second replay 1–0 away from home.

Semi-final results
Date	Home team	Score	Away team	Venue
6 March 1875	Dumbarton	1–0 (protested) (Note: A protest from Renton was upheld and a replay was ordered.)	Renton	Meadow Park, Dumbarton
20 March 1875	Clydesdale	0–0	Queen's Park	Kinning Park, Kinning Park

Semi-final replays
Date	Home team	Score	Away team	Venue
27 March 1875	Queen's Park	2–2	Clydesdale	Hampden Park, Crosshill
27 March 1875	Renton	1–1	Dumbarton	Neutral venue, Alexandria

Semi-final second replays
Date	Home team	Score	Away team	Venue
3 April 1875	Clydesdale	0–1	Queen's Park	Kinning Park, Kinning Park
3 April 1875	Dumbarton	0–1	Renton	Ropework Lane, Dumbarton

== Final ==
After 26 matches played and 53 goals scored, the tournament culminated in the 1875 Scottish Cup Final on 10 April 1875. The match, played at the original Hampden Park in Crosshill, was watched by 7,000 spectators and refereed by A. Campbell of Clydesdale. As Hampden Park was the home of finalists Queen's Park, the match was one of a select few cup finals in Scotland that were not played on neutral territory.

All three goals came in the final 15 minutes of the match courtesy of Scotland internationals Angus MacKinnon, Thomas Highet and Billy MacKinnon. Queen's Park won 3–0 to claim the trophy for the second consecutive season.

10 April 1875
15:00

Queen's Park	3–0	Renton
A. MacKinnon 75'; Highet 80'; B. MacKinnon

Hampden Park, Crosshill
Attendance: 7,000
Referee: A. Campbell (Clydesdale)

== See also ==
- 1874–75 in Scottish football
