= Caledonian F.C. (Glasgow) =

Former association football club in Scotland

Caledonian
- Full name: Caledonian Football Club
- Founded: 1875
- Dissolved: 1882
- Ground: Burnbank Park
- Secretary: C. M. Mackay
Home colours

Caledonian Football Club, occasionally referred to as Glasgow Caledonian, was a 19th-century association football club based at Kelvinbridge, in Glasgow.

== History ==
From 1872, a number of cricket clubs in Glasgow had adopted the laws of association football, to keep the members active in the winter. The Caledonian cricket club was a comparative latecomer to the association game; it did not set up a football club until 1875, coupled with a lacrosse club. Almost the first activity of the club was to enter the Scottish Cup - the club's first match was its first round tie at home to Western on 23 October 1875. The match ended in a goalless draw thanks to "the formidable resistance shown by the youngest Association club", although, as some players were more familiar with rugby rules, "hands" was claimed against the club a number of times. Although the Caledonian played better in the replay, before "several hundred" spectators, Western was 2–0 up inside 25 minutes, and scored a third late on.

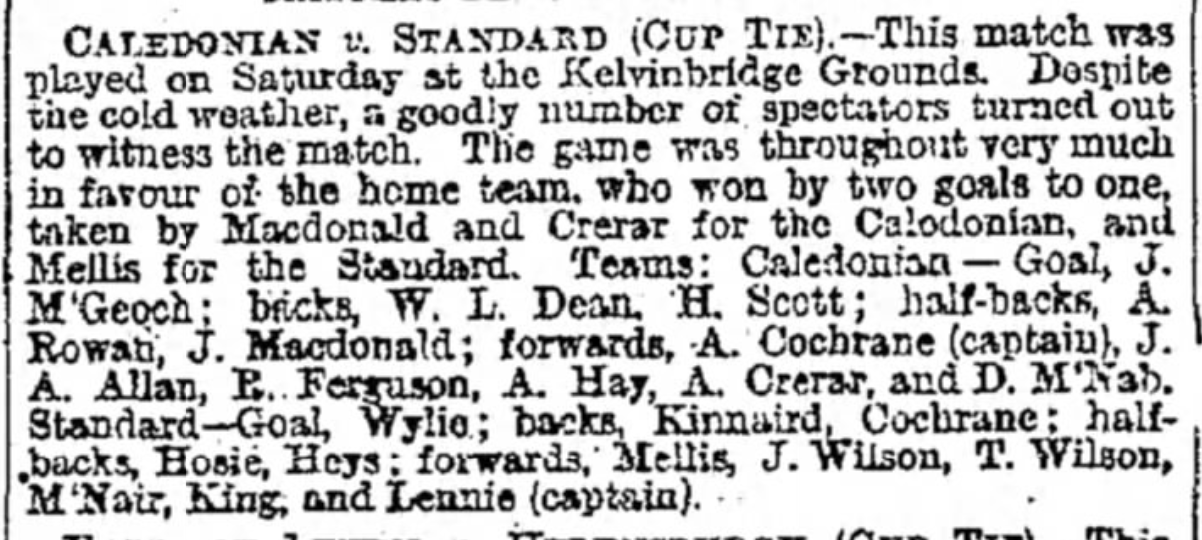
Match report of Caledonian v Standard, Scottish Cup 1st Round, 1876-77, from the Glasgow Herald, 2 October 1876

Its first friendly of note was against "their old rivals in the cricket field", the Clydesdale club, at the latter's Kinning Park in February 1876, and "much interest was centred in the event". Although the Caledonian forwards were "much faster and heavier" than their opponents, they were "greatly inferior to the Clydesdale in combined play", and the experience of the home side in teamwork saw it win 4–0. The club's record in its first season was 2 wins, 2 draws, and 6 losses.

The club quickly attracted members; by 1876–77 it had 78 members, more than anyone in Glasgow other than Queen's Park and the Third Lanarkshire Rifle Volunteers, and three more even than Rangers, although when the club hosted Rangers in a friendly in January 1877, the older club won 5–1.

That season Caledonian won for the first time in the Cup, coming from behind to beat Standard, but the club was unlucky to be drawn against Queen's Park in the second round, as the Spiders at the time had never been beaten. By now the Caledonian was considered one of the "big" Glasgow clubs, and between 2,000 and 3,000 spectators turned up to Kelvinbridge for the match; although the club was expected to lose, the final score of 7–0 was not - four goals scored in the second half "with alarming rapidity" to add to a Senior first-half hat-trick.

The club had a little more luck in 1877–78, being drawn a bye in the first round, and beating Rosslyn 1–0 in the second. However that was the last tie the club would ever win. In the third round the club lost 3–0 at home to the first Partick club "after a very hard contested game".

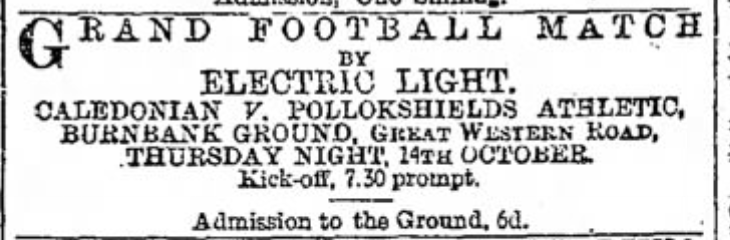
Advert for floodlit football match between Caledonian and Pollokshields Athletic, Glasgow Herald, 12 October 1880

The club now was not considered a leading side and did not attract high-profile friendly matches in Glasgow. The club was still an attraction outside; the Caledonian was one of the first teams to visit Ireland for football, and in October 1879 beat Cliftonville 10–1 in a friendly. The club's trip to Kilmarnock Athletic in 1880, being the first visit to Ayrshire, attracted 2,000 spectators, and the Caledonian won 2–1. Later that year the club experimented with floodlit football, taking advantage of the Gas Exhibition in Glasgow to invite firms to demonstrate their lights to the public. The club played Pollokshields Athletic on 14 October, with the Burnbank ground lit by a Crompton 4,000 candlepower light, two Lontin lights of 2,000 candlepower, and one Strode light. The experiment was a success, as "the lights were very bright, and enabled the spectators to follow the movements of the players quite clearly"; the match itself was not, as Athletic won 4–0.

After the 1880–81 season, the Ewing brothers, who had played for both the football and lacrosse sides from the club's inception, emigrated to New Zealand. This seems to have taken a lot of the spirit out of the club and its final match of note was a 14–0 defeat to Queen's Park in the first round of the 1881–82 Scottish Cup, the club by now being considered "not by any means one of the first or even second order". The club's decline from prominence is demonstrated by two other clubs using the name by 1882 (one from Rutherglen and one from Airdrie), as well Caledonia F.C. (Greenock) who played in the Scottish Cup in 1883–84.

== Colours ==
The club's colours were originally given as orange, red, and blue. From its second season they were given as red, yellow, and blue; these were described as "stripes", which, at the time, referred to hoops.

== Ground ==
The club played at the Kelvin Bridge cricket ground on the Great Western Road. From 1877 the club moved to the Burbank Ground, the old cricket ground being "feued for housing". In 1879, because of a shift in the club's pitch, the club sold the old pavilion to Queen's Park.

== Notable players ==
- Archie Rowan, goalkeeper, earned one international cap for Scotland in 1880 when a Caledonian player
