= William Browning (footballer) =

Scottish footballer

Personal information
- Full name: William Browning
- Place of birth: Scotland
- Position: Outside left

Senior career*
Years	Team	Apps	(Gls)
1933–1941	Queen's Park	83	(22)

International career
1934–1939	Scotland Amateurs	3	(0)
- * Club domestic league appearances and goals

William Browning was a Scottish amateur football outside left who played in the Scottish League for Queen's Park. He was capped by Scotland at amateur level.
