= Robert W. Neill =

Scottish footballer

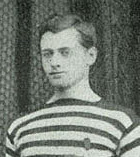
Neill in 1874

Robert Walker Neill (11 September 1853 – 19 August 1928) was a Scottish footballer in the early years of the sport. He played for Queen's Park, claiming the Scottish Cup in 1874 (its first edition), 1875, 1876 and 1880, and Scotland (featuring in five matches between 1876 and 1880, finishing on the winning side on every occasion). Some years after retiring due to injury, he emigrated to Perth, Australia without the knowledge of his family.

His younger brother Quintin was also a footballer, who began his career at Queen's Park before moving to England with Lincoln City.

== See also ==
- List of Scotland national football team captains
