= Hamilton F.C. (1874–1878) =

Former association football club in Scotland

Hamilton
- Full name: Hamilton Football Club
- Founded: 1874
- Dissolved: 1878
- Ground: South Avenue
- Secretary: Richard Mackintosh
Home colours

Hamilton Football Club was a 19th-century football club based in Hamilton, in Lanarkshire, Scotland.

== History ==
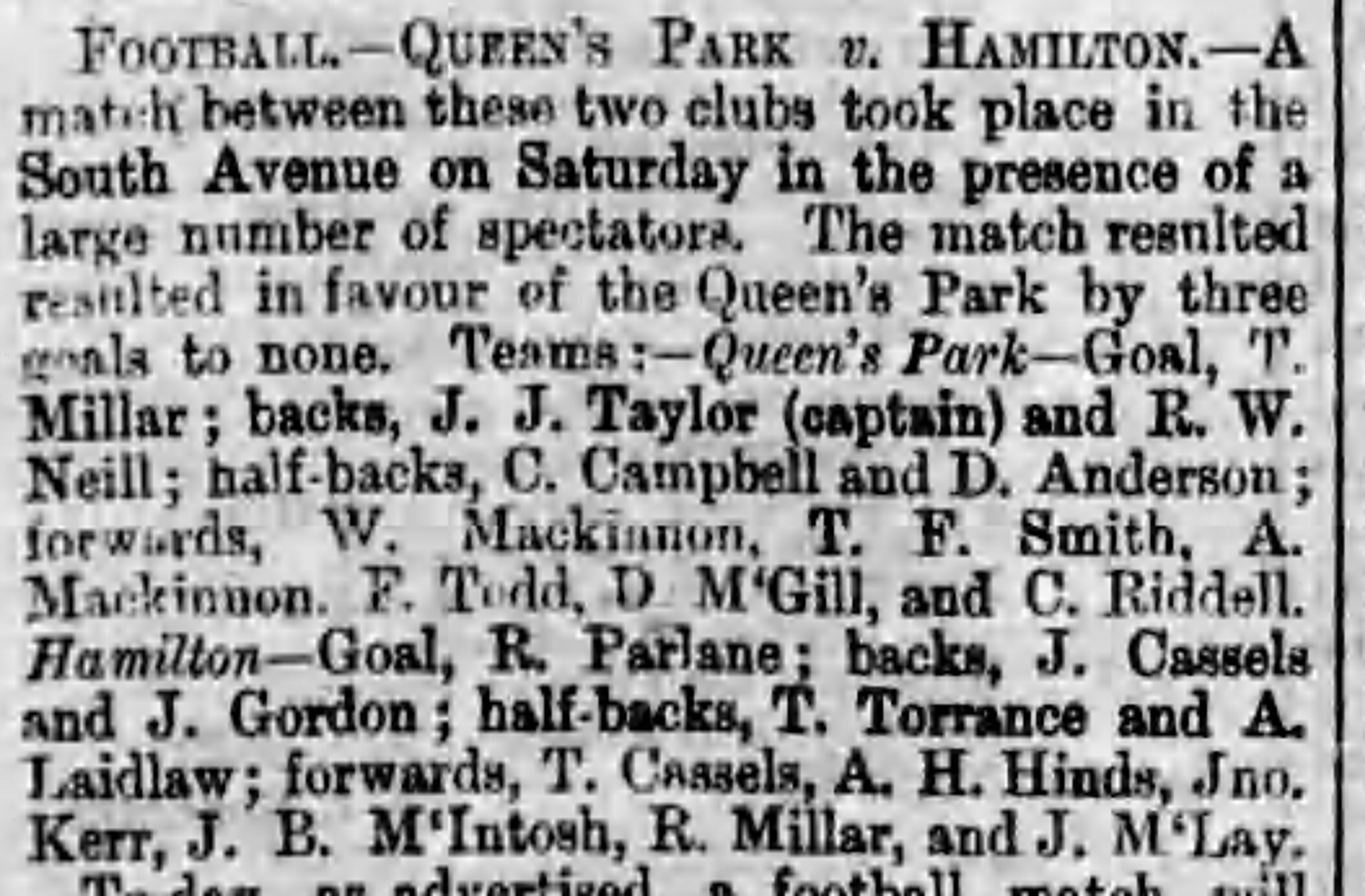
Report of a friendly match between Hamilton F.C. and Queen's Park F.C., Hamilton Advertiser, 21 April 1877

The club was founded shortly after the dissolution of Hamilton Gymnasium as a footballing section of the Hamilton Cricket Club, with the earliest known match being against Eastern of Glasgow in April 1874. The club promptly entered the second edition of the Scottish Cup, in 1874–75, but after two draws with Rovers at the first round stage, Hamilton scratched.

In December 1874, the club's second XI was the first opponent for Hamilton Academical.

The club's best run came in 1876–77. At the third round stage, after two draws with Busby, the second in front of a crowd of over 500, both clubs were put through to the fourth round in accordance with the regulations at the time. Hamilton then lost 2–0 at Lancefield of Glasgow in "a very one-sided game".

The club's home second round defeat to Uddingston in 1877–78 seems to have been the end of the club. In 1878 the club's ground was taken over by Hamilton Academical, and the club was not represented at the first meeting of the Lanarkshire Football Association in 1879.

== Colours ==
Hamilton played in blue jerseys, and white knickerbockers.

== Grounds ==
Hamilton originally played on the grassland on the South Haugh, before, in February 1875, they secured a pitch at South Avenue, renting it from the Duke of Hamilton for £50 per annum.
