= James J. Thomson =

Scottish footballer

James Thomson
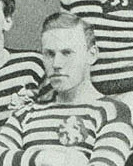

Personal information
- Full name: James John Thomson
- Date of birth: 25 December 1851
- Place of birth: Annan, Scotland
- Date of death: 23 July 1915 (aged 63)
- Place of death: London, England
- Position: Half back

Senior career*
Years	Team	Apps	(Gls)
1871–1874	Queen's Park		

International career
1872–1874	Scotland	3	(0)
- * Club domestic league appearances and goals

James John Thomson (25 December 1851 – 23 July 1915) was a Scottish footballer who played in three international matches for Scotland. Thomson appeared in the first official international football match, a goalless draw with England, and also took part in the fixture in the two subsequent years. Like the majority of the earliest Scotland internationals, he played club football with Queen's Park, winning the inaugural edition of the Scottish Cup in 1874 as team captain, before relocating to London on business shortly afterwards.

== See also ==
- List of Scotland national football team captains
