= Joseph Taylor (footballer, born 1850) =

Scottish footballer

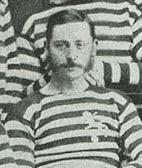

Personal information
- Date of birth: 16 December 1850
- Place of birth: Dunoon, Scotland
- Date of death: 4 October 1888 (aged 37)
- Place of death: Glasgow, Scotland
- Position: Fullback

Senior career*
Years	Team	Apps	(Gls)
1870–1877	Queen's Park		

International career
1872–1876	Scotland	6	(0)
- * Club domestic league appearances and goals

Joseph Taylor (16 December 1850 – 4 October 1888) was a Scottish amateur footballer who played for Scotland in the first ever international football match against England in 1872.

Taylor is regarded as an important figure in early international football, playing in all of Scotland's first six international games, and captaining them on two occasions. A fullback, Taylor played for Queen's Park with whom he won the Scottish Cup in 1874, 1875 and 1876.

His final international appearance came in the first international match against Wales on 25 March 1876. After retirement from football in 1877, Taylor was appointed Club President of Queen's Park.

== Honours ==
- Scottish Cup: 1874, 1875, 1876

== See also ==
- List of Scotland national football team captains
