= James Phillips (footballer) =

Scottish footballer

Personal information
- Position: Half back

Senior career*
Years	Team	Apps	(Gls)
- Queen's Park

International career
1877–1878	Scotland	3	(0)
- * Club domestic league appearances and goals

James Phillips was a Scottish footballer who played as a half back.

== Career ==
Phillips played club football for Queen's Park, and made three appearances for Scotland. He won the Scottish Cup twice with Queen's Park and was elected a life member of the club in 1879.
