= Helensburgh F.C. (1874) =

Former association football club in Scotland

Helensburgh
- Full name: Helensburgh Football Club
- Founded: 1874
- Dissolved: 1882
- Ground: Ardencaple Park
- Secretary: Joseph Jamieson
Home colours

Helensburgh F.C. was a nineteenth-century association football club from Helensburgh in Dunbartonshire, Scotland.

== History ==
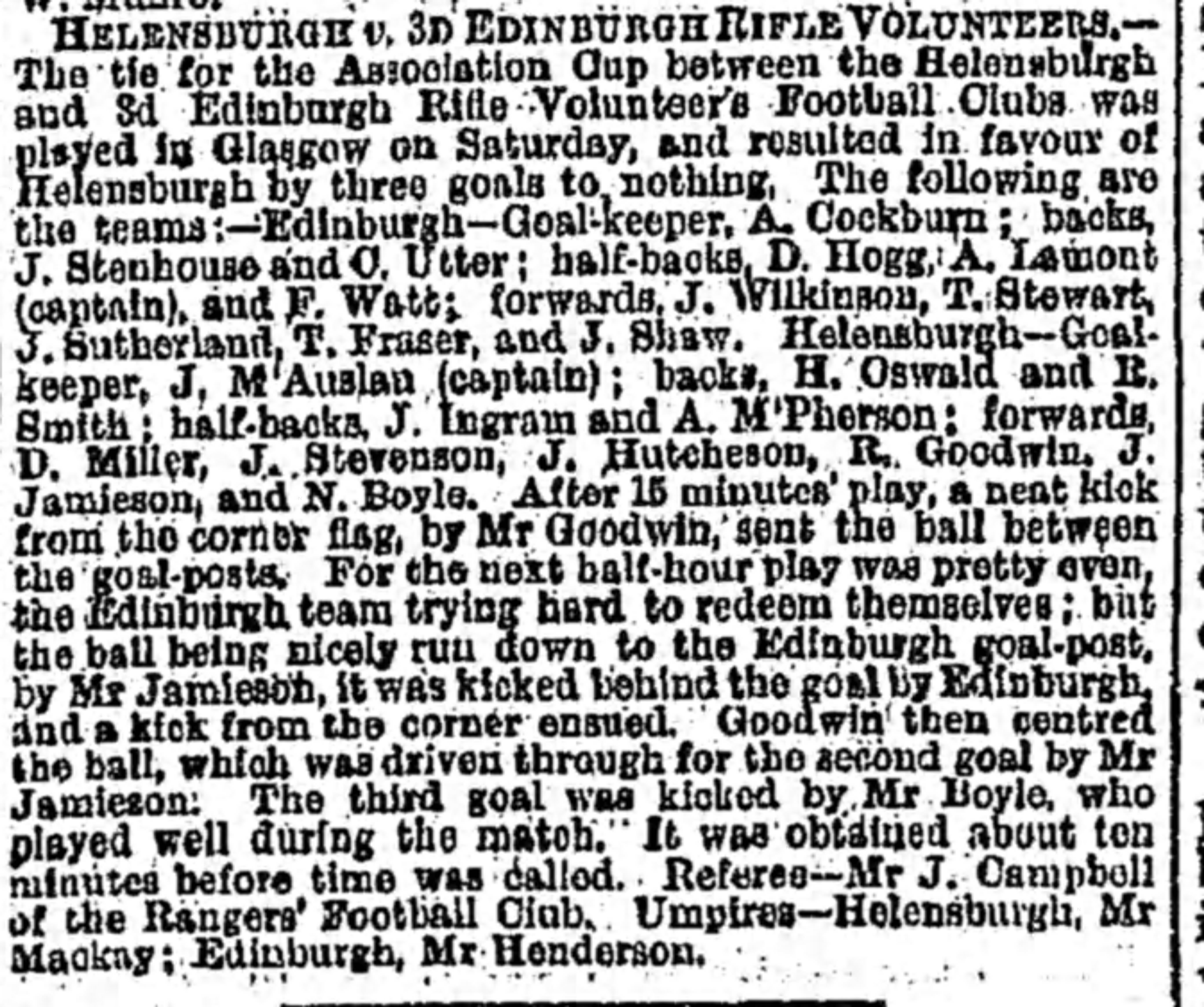
Report of Helensburgh v 3rd Edinburgh R.V., Scottish Cup First Round, 1874-75

The club was founded in 1874. The club's earliest association match reported was a defeat at home to Rangers F.C. in March 1874.

The club entered the Scottish Cup for the first time in 1874–75, beating the 3rd Edinburgh Rifle Volunteers F.C. in Glasgow in the first round, and losing to local rivals Renton F.C. in the second.

Helensburgh's best run in the Cup came in 1878–79. The club was awarded its tie with Heart of Midlothian F.C. after the Hearts refused to play a replay in accordance with the Scottish Football Association's instructions, and beat Hibernian F.C. at the Powderhall ground, on its way to the semi-finals, which, that season, had three clubs; unfortunately for the club, Helensburgh missed out on the bye to the final, and lost 3–0 at home to a Vale of Leven side heavily backed by a local factory and de facto a professional side.

The following season, the club again lost to the Vale, and lost to Vale for the third year in succession - the regional nature of the draws making such repeat ties more likely - in 1880–81, two goals just before half-time contributing to a 4–1 defeat.

The club's last entry to the competition came in 1881–82, losing in the fourth round to Arthurlie F.C. in a match spoilt by heavy wind. The club folded during the season, thanks to crowds dwindling to the single figures, with competition from the successful Dunbartonshire sides in the vicinity, and the club was struck off the register in August 1882. The name was later used by at least three other clubs, including one founded in 1896 which became a member of the Scottish League.

== Colours ==
The club originally played in blue and yellow shirts and shorts, with black hose. In 1880 the club changed to blue shirts and white shorts.

== Ground ==
The club originally played at Ardencaple Park, two miles from the railway station. In 1877 it moved to Kirkmichael Park.
