= Robert Leckie (footballer) =

Scottish footballer

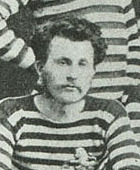

Personal information
- Date of birth: 19 October 1846
- Place of birth: Killearn, Stirlingshire, Scotland
- Date of death: February 1887 (aged 40)
- Place of death: Port Elizabeth, South Africa

Senior career*
Years	Team	Apps	(Gls)
1867–1875	Queen's Park		

International career
1872	Scotland	1	(0)
- * Club domestic league appearances and goals

Robert Leckie (19 October 1846 – February 1887) was a Scottish footballer and one of the founding members of Queen's Park Football Club.

Leckie played for Queen's Park from its formation in 1867 until his retirement from football in 1875, winning the inaugural Scottish Cup competition in 1874.

He also won a solitary cap for the Scotland national team, playing in the first ever international match against England on 30 November 1872, where he nearly won the game for Scotland in the dying moments after shooting the ball just over the line of tape used as the crossbar in a goalless draw.
