= Angus MacKinnon =

Scottish footballer

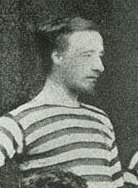
MacKinnon in 1874

Angus MacKinnon (c. 1851 – 24 July 1880) was a Scottish footballer who played for Queen's Park and represented Scotland. Born in Glasgow (but not related to his teammate Billy), he played once for Scotland, scoring the winning goal in a 2–1 victory against England in March 1874. After winning two Scottish Cups at club level, he emigrated to Canada but died there aged 29.
