= Billy MacKinnon =

Scottish footballer

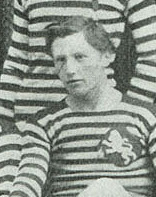

Personal information
- Full name: William Muir MacKinnon
- Date of birth: 18 January 1852
- Place of birth: Glasgow, Scotland
- Date of death: 24 May 1942 (aged 90)
- Place of death: Cambuslang, Scotland
- Position: Forward

Senior career*
Years	Team	Apps	(Gls)
1870–1880	Queen's Park		

International career
1872–1879	Scotland	9	(5)
- * Club domestic league appearances and goals

William Muir MacKinnon (18 January 1852 – 24 May 1942) was a Scottish footballer who played for Queen's Park and the Scotland national team in the 1870s.

With Queen's Park, MacKinnon won the first three Scottish Cup competitions in 1874, 1875 and 1876 (being no relation of teammate Angus MacKinnon), as well as the first Glasgow Merchants Charity Cup in 1877. He was also capped by Scotland, making nine appearances between 1872 and 1879, scoring five goals. As a player, he was described as "a brilliant dribbling artist".

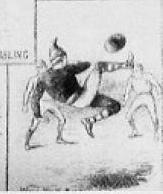
This illustration from the 1872 Scotland v England football match is known to be of MacKinnon, as reports mentioned his use of an overhead kick technique

MacKinnon was the only player who appeared in all of the first seven official international matches between Scotland and England, making him the first caps record holder in international football history. He held the Scotland record until March 1881, when Henry McNeil earned his 10th cap.

Outside the game he was an ironworks engineer and had a great interest in music with a talent for singing.

== International goals ==
Scores and results list Scotland's goal tally first.

#	Date	Venue	Opponent	Score	Result	Competition
1	4 March 1876	Hamilton Crescent, Glasgow	England	1–0	3–0	Friendly
2	25 March 1876	Hamilton Crescent, Glasgow	Wales	2–0	4–0	Friendly
3	2 March 1878	Hampden Park, Glasgow	England	6–0	7–2	Friendly
4	5 April 1879	Kennington Oval, London	England	1–1	4–5	Friendly
5	5 April 1879	Kennington Oval, London	England	4–1	4–5	Friendly
