= Jerry Weir =

Scottish footballer

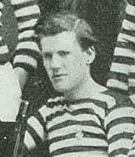
Weir in 1874

James Biggar "Jerry" Weir (21 October 1851 – 22 December 1887) was a Scottish footballer, who played for Queen's Park and Scotland. Weir scored two goals in four appearances for Scotland. He also won the Scottish Cup three times with Queen's Park.

A joiner to trade, he emigrated to Australia, and died of typhoid fever while working on a railway construction project.
