= Thomas Highet =

Scottish footballer

Thomas Cochrane Highet (28 August 1853 – 26 January 1907) was a Scottish footballer, who played for Queen's Park and represented Scotland four times.

Highet was born in Ayr and was educated at Ayr Academy. He joined Queen's Park after moving to the Glasgow area in 1873, although his first competitive match - in the first Scottish Cup, in 1873–74 - was for Granville.

Highet also played cricket, representing Clydesdale, Ayr Eglinton and Granville.

== Personal life ==
Thomas' son John was also a footballer for Queen's Park.
