= Hampden Park (1873) =

Former football ground in Crosshill, Renfrewshire, Scotland

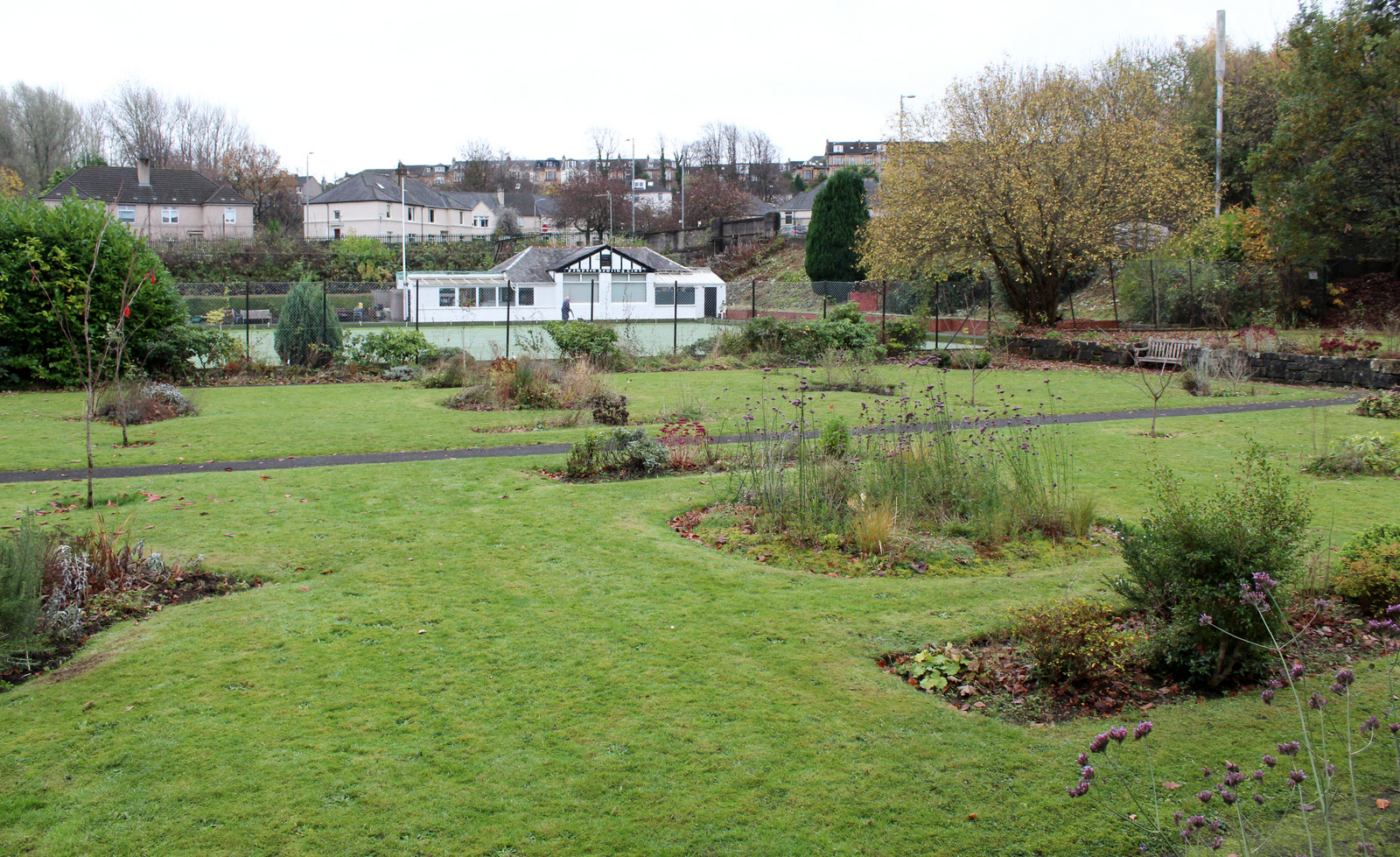
- The stadium site, now Kingsley Gardens

- Location within Glasgow council area
- Location: Crosshill, Scotland
- Coordinates: 55.8304°N 4.2566°W
- Surface: Grass

Construction
- Opened: 25 October 1873
- Closed: 1883

Tenants
- Queen's Park; Scotland national football team

Hampden Park was a football ground in Crosshill, Renfrewshire (now part of Glasgow). The home ground of Queen's Park from 1873 until 1883, it was the first of three stadiums to bear the same name, and hosted the first-ever Scottish Cup final in 1874.

== History ==
Hampden Park was built between the Queen's Park Recreation Ground (where the club had played until then) and Hampden Terrace, taking its name from the road. The first enclosed stadium with turnstiles in the United Kingdom, it was opened on 25 October 1873 for Queen Park's first-ever competitive match, a Scottish Cup first round tie against Dumbreck, with Queen's Park winning 7–0. The ground later hosted the first Scottish Cup final, which saw Queen's Park beat Clydesdale 2–0. It was subsequently used to host the finals in 1875, 1876 (the replay), 1877 (the second replay), 1878, 1879 (the final and the replay), 1880 and 1883 (the final and replay).

Hampden was used to host six Scotland international matches; it was first used on 2 March 1878 for a 7–2 win against England, and a 9–0 win against Wales followed on 23 March. It hosted four more matches, the last being a 5–0 win over Wales on 25 March 1882.

In 1883 the club left Hampden Park due to plans by the Caledonian Railway to build the Cathcart branch across the site (Cathcart Road, which had run to the west of the ground, was also rerouted between Queen Mary Avenue and Prospecthill Road to run alongside the new railway lines); they moved a few hundred metres east to a new ground, which they also named Hampden Park. However, it was not ready until 1884, until which home matches were played at the Titwood cricket ground owned by Clydesdale Cricket Club. In 1903 Queen's Park moved again to the current Hampden Park, with the second Hampden taken over by Third Lanark, rebuilt and renamed Cathkin Park.

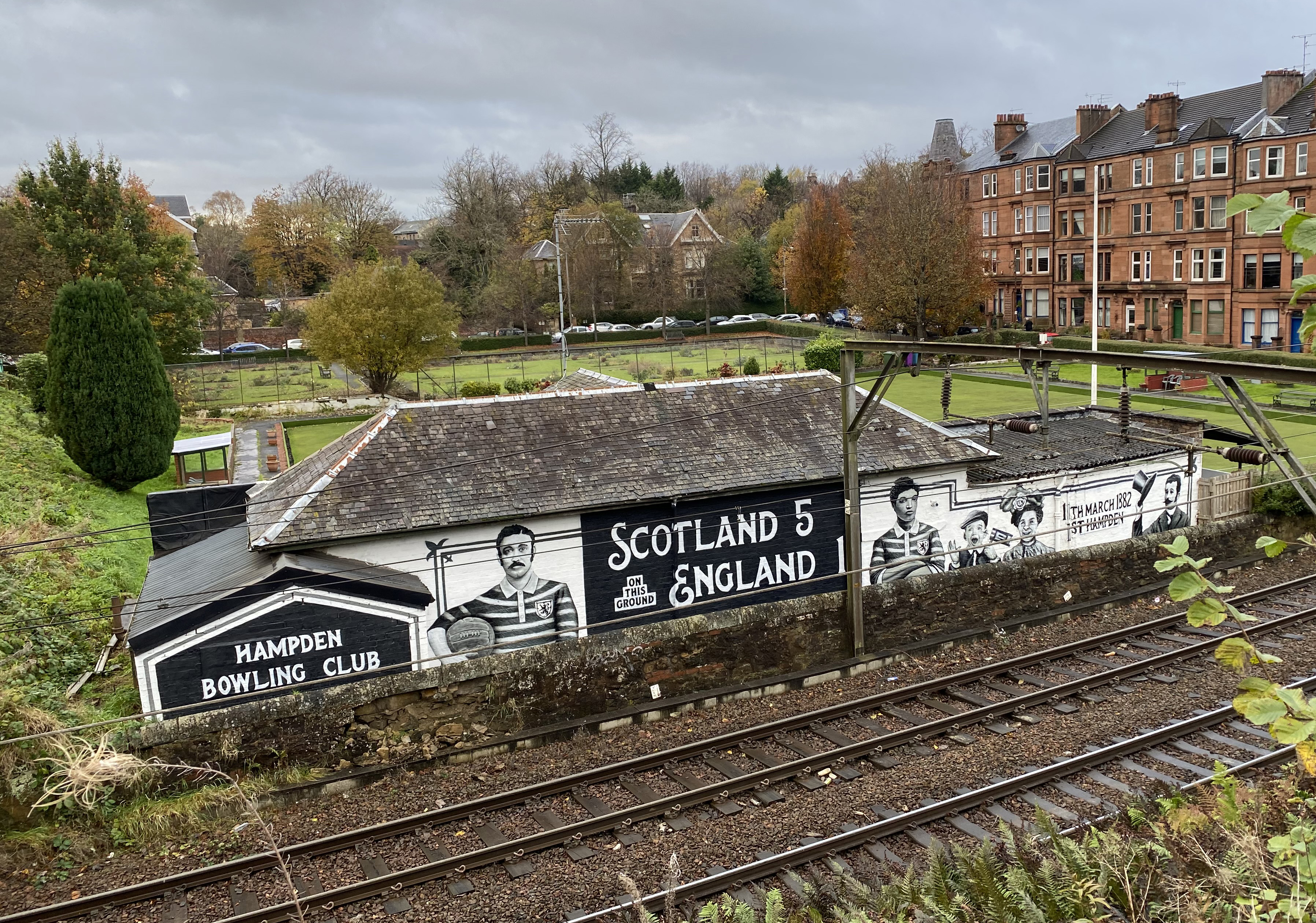
Mural overlooking railway lines at rear of Hampden Bowling Club

The site of the first Hampden Park is now occupied by railway lines, Hampden lawn bowling club and Kingsley Gardens. Its precise location was uncertain until 2017 when a map of the railway plans was found which showed the line's route across the pitch. An archaeological dig was conducted at the site in 2021 in an effort to more fully establish the layout and structures and uncover historical artifacts.

In 2019 a mural was painted onto the rear wall of the clubhouse by Glasgow-based artist Ashley Rawson, on the theme of Scotland's 5–1 win over England in March 1882, featuring portraits of players Charles Campbell and Andrew Watson.

The lawn bowling club closed in 2025. In May 2026, the first Hampden Park was given protected status by Historic Environment Scotland. The listing refers only to the Kingsley Gardens portion at the north of the site, with no evidence found to support claims that the bowling clubhouse was the same building as the football pavilion, or was constructed using materials from it.

== See also ==
- Scotland national football team 1872–1914 results
