= Ayrshire derby =

Derby in Scottish football

Ayrshire Derby
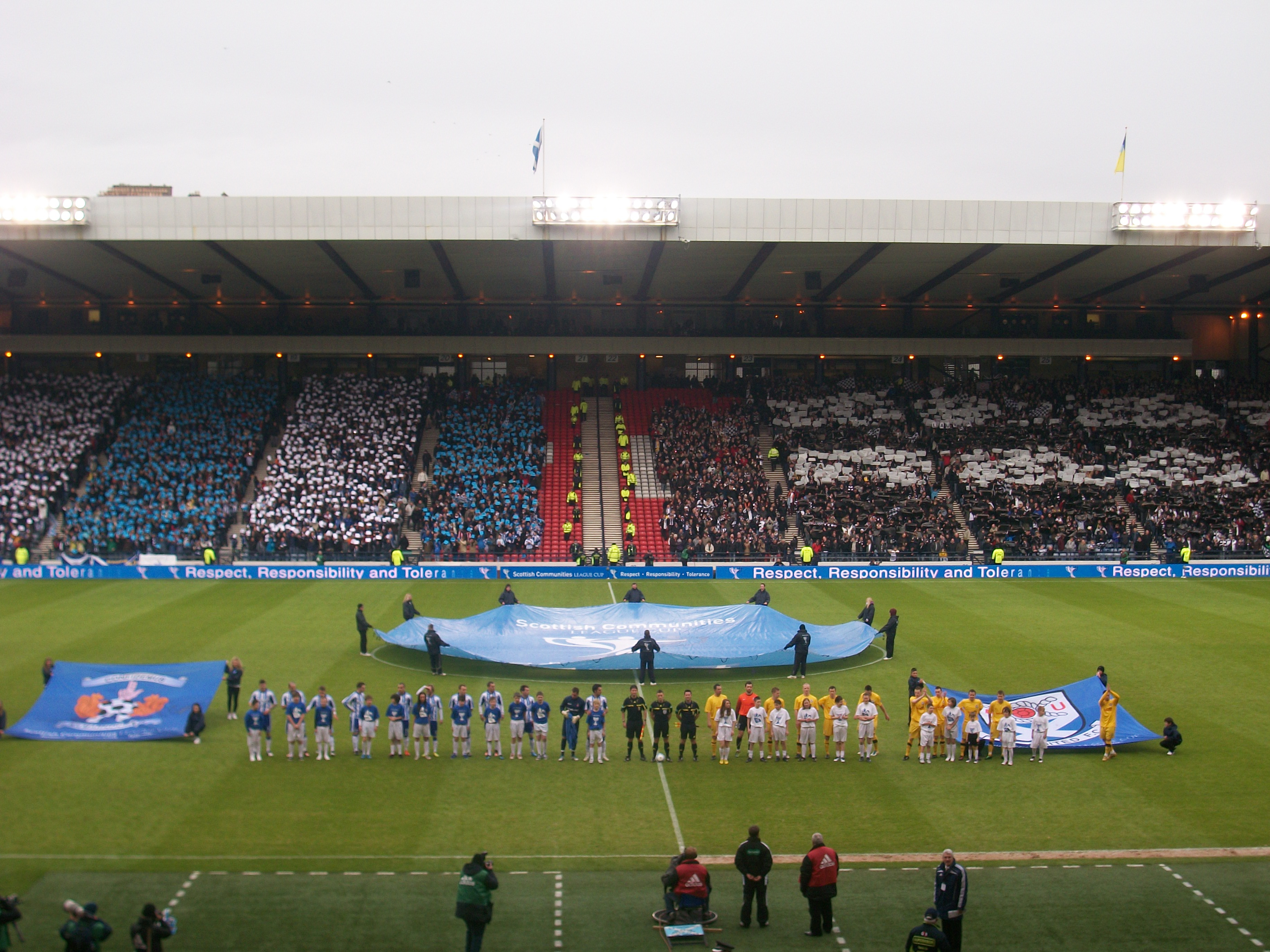
- Both sets of fans hold up card displays as the teams line up before the 2012 Scottish League Cup Semi-final at Hampden Park
- Location: Ayrshire
- Teams: Ayr United F.C. Kilmarnock F.C.
- First meeting: 14 September 1910
- Latest meeting: Kilmarnock 3–2 Ayr United; 2026-27 Scottish League Cup (14 August 2026)
- Stadiums: Rugby Park (Kilmarnock); Somerset Park (Ayr)

Statistics
- Total meetings: 143 (Note: National competitions only)
- Most wins: Kilmarnock (60)
- Largest victory: Kilmarnock 7–2 Ayr United (1935)
- Largest goal scoring: Kilmarnock 3–5 Ayr United (1932)
- Longest win streak: 4 games Kilmarnock (2021–2022)
- Longest unbeaten streak: 9 games Kilmarnock (2021–2022)
- Location of the two teams' stadia

The Ayrshire Derby refers to football matches between the Scottish professional football clubs Ayr United F.C. and Kilmarnock F.C., both based in Ayrshire. The clubs play at Somerset Park and at Rugby Park respectively. The first match was held on 14 September 1910, in the same year that Ayr United were formed. This game was the final of the Ayrshire League in the 1909–10 season, and finished in a 4–4 draw. Ayr United were the first of the clubs to record a win the following season.

The six most recent meetings took place in national cup competitions because Kilmarnock have more regularly played in a higher division than Ayr since 1993. Up until 1998, both clubs competed in a local cup competition, the Ayrshire Cup, which also involved local junior sides.

The current record for Ayrshire derby games in major competitions stands at 60 wins for Kilmarnock and 49 for Ayr United. The term Ayrshire Derby has also been used to refer to Scottish Cup matches involving two teams from the county, most recently in the 2018–19 fourth round when Auchinleck Talbot beat Ayr United.

== Results table ==
=== National competitions ===
As of August 2026

| Competition (Note: Does not include minor or wartime tournaments such as the Scottish War Emergency Cup) | GP | AYR | D | KIL | AYRG | KILG |
|---|---|---|---|---|---|---|
| Scottish Football League (Note: Includes all divisions and versions of main league system (they never met during the Scottish Premier League era, nor since the advent of the Scottish Professional Football League)) | 113 | 40 | 27 | 46 | 148 | 191 |
| Scottish Cup | 10 | 3 | 2 | 5 | 12 | 16 |
| Scottish League Cup | 18 | 6 | 5 | 8 | 17 | 21 |
| Scottish Challenge Cup | 1 | 0 | 0 | 1 | 0 | 1 |
| Total | 143 | 49 | 34 | 60 | 179 | 232 |

Table only includes matches between Kilmarnock and Ayr United from 1910. Major fixtures involving Ayr's predecessor clubs are shown below:

- 1875–76 Scottish Cup Round 1: Kilmarnock 8–0 Ayr Eglinton
- 1877–78 Scottish Cup Round 2: Ayr Academicals 1–0 Kilmarnock
- 1880–81 Scottish Cup Round 2: Kilmarnock 6–3 Ayr FC
- 1887–88 Scottish Cup Round 1: Kilmarnock 8–2 Ayr Thistle
- 1897–98 Scottish Cup Qualifying Round: Kilmarnock 7–1 Ayr FC
- 1897–98 Scottish Cup Round 4: Ayr Parkhouse 2–7 Kilmarnock
- Scottish Football League Second Division
  - 1897–98: Kilmarnock 5–2 Ayr FC, Ayr FC 0–3 Kilmarnock
  - 1898–99: Ayr FC 1–1 Kilmarnock, Kilmarnock 5–1 Ayr FC

=== Defunct local competitions ===
| Competition | GP | AYR | D | KIL | AYRG | KILG |
|---|---|---|---|---|---|---|
| Ayrshire Cup (1930–1998) | 70 | 26 | 11 | 33 | 93 | 123 |
| Ayrshire League (1910–1911) | 4 | 2 | 1 | 1 | 10 | 8 |
| Ayr Charity Cup (1928–1939) | 11 | 5 | 4 | 2 | 28 | 15 |
| Kilmarnock Charity Cup (1928–1939) | 11 | 5 | 1 | 5 | 24 | 33 |
| West Sound Trophy (2003–2005) | 3 | 0 | 1 | 2 | 2 | 7 |
| Total | 99 | 38 | 18 | 43 | 157 | 186 |

== Recent matches ==
This section shows the most recent competitive match-ups between the sides.

Scottish League Cup 2026–27
14 August 2026
19:45

| Kilmarnock | 3–2 | Ayr United |
|---|---|---|
| Hugill 38'; Schjønning-Larsen 79'; Cleșcenco 89' | BBC Report | Stirton 5'; Taylor 48' |

Rugby Park, Kilmarnock
Attendance: 12,365
Referee: Matthew MacDermid

Scottish Championship 2021–22
11 March 2022
19:45

| Ayr United | 1–3 | Kilmarnock |
|---|---|---|
| Fjørtoft (red card) 30'; McInroy 38' | BBC Report | McKenzie 7'; Shaw 12'; Sanders 16' |

Somerset Park, Ayr
Attendance: 6,136
Referee: Alan Muir

Scottish Championship 2021–22
9 February 2022
19:45

| Kilmarnock | 1–2 | Ayr United |
|---|---|---|
| F. Murray 7' | BBC Report | Maxwell 14'; Reading 80' |

Rugby Park, Kilmarnock
Attendance: 7,560
Referee: Bobby Madden

Scottish Championship 2021–22
26 October 2021
19:45

| Ayr United | 0–1 | Kilmarnock |
|---|---|---|
| | BBC Report | Shaw 89' (pen.) |

Somerset Park, Ayr
Attendance: 6,052
Referee: Nick Walsh

Scottish Championship 2021–22
2 August 2021
19:45

| Kilmarnock | 2–0 | Ayr United |
|---|---|---|
| Polworth 56'; Cameron 86' (pen.) | BBC Report |

Rugby Park, Kilmarnock
Attendance: 3,600
Referee: Don Robertson

Scottish League Cup 2017–18
14 July 2017
19:45

| Ayr United | 1–0 | Kilmarnock |
|---|---|---|
| Geggan 39' | SPFL Report |

Somerset Park, Ayr
Attendance: 6,417
Referee: John Beaton

Scottish League Cup 2014–15
26 August 2014
19:45
Second Round

| Kilmarnock | 1–0 | Ayr United |
|---|---|---|
| Rory McKenzie 69' | BBC Report |

Rugby Park
Attendance: 8,877
Referee: Craig Thompson

Scottish League Cup 2011–12
28 January 2012
13:00
Semi Final

| Ayr United | 0–1 (a.e.t.) | Kilmarnock |
|---|---|---|
| | | Dean Shiels 109' |

Hampden Park
Attendance: 25,057
Referee: Steven McLean

Scottish Cup 2008–09
22 January 2009
19:45
Fourth round (replay)

| Kilmarnock | 3–1 | Ayr United |
|---|---|---|
| Simon Ford 50', 80'; Mehdi Taouil 76' | BBC Report | Bryan Prunty 13' |

Rugby Park
Attendance: 11,563

Scottish Cup 2008–09
10 January 2009
Fourth round

| Ayr United | 2–2 | Kilmarnock |
|---|---|---|
| Dean Keenan 15'; Alex Williams 90' | BBC Report | Manuel Pascali 9'; Craig Bryson 54' |

Somerset Park
Attendance: 9,280

Scottish League Cup 2001–02
9 October 2001

| Ayr United | 0–0 (a.e.t.) | Kilmarnock |
Penalties
| | 5–4 |

Somerset Park
Attendance: 7,418

Scottish Cup 1998–99
23 November 1999

| Ayr United | 3–0 | Kilmarnock |
|---|---|---|
| Andrew Lyons 29'; Andy Walker 81' (pen.), 83' (pen.) |

Somerset Park
Attendance: 10,153

In January 2009, the two clubs met for the first time in over seven years. They were drawn together in the Scottish Cup at Somerset Park. The game finished 2–2, Kilmarnock twice taking the lead and Ayr United equalising twice, with the final goal of the game scored by substitute Ayr striker Alex Williams in injury time. Ayr keeper Stephen Grindlay also saved a penalty kick from Kilmarnock's Allan Russell. In the replay at Rugby Park, Ayr United took the lead with a goal from Bryan Prunty, which television replays confirmed had involved the use of his hand. However, Kilmarnock won the tie 3–1 with goals from Simon Ford (twice) and Moroccan Medhi Taouil. This was Kilmarnock's first victory in the derby in a senior competition for seventeen years.

The previous meeting was a Scottish League Cup tie in October 2001. Ayr United had midfielder Paul Sheerin sent off early in the second half, playing the rest of the 90 minutes and extra time with ten men. However, no goals were scored in open play, and Ayr United won 5–4, with Chris Innes of Kilmarnock missing the vital spot-kick. Prior to that, Ayr United recorded 3–0 and 2–0 wins in the Scottish Cup in 1997–98 and 1998–99, the former bringing to an end Kilmarnock's reign as the cup holders. In the 1998–99 match, Andy Walker scored two penalties, the second of them being chipped over the Kilmarnock goalkeeper Gordon Marshall.

=== 2011–12 League Cup Semi-Final ===
On 28 January 2012, Ayr United and Kilmarnock met at Hampden Park for the League Cup semi-final. Kilmarnock won 1–0 thanks to a 109th-minute goal from Dean Shiels. This was the first time that the Ayrshire derby had taken place in the semi-finals of a major competition and it was also the first derby to be played at a neutral venue. The game also achieved the highest recorded post-World War II crowd of any Ayrshire derby with 25,057 people travelling to Hampden (Kilmarnock versus Ayr United on 19 March 1938 had a crowd of 27,442).

== League ==
The last league meeting between the sides was on 20 March 1993 at Rugby Park, finishing in a 1–1 draw. Since then, Kilmarnock have played in the Scottish Premier League and Ayr in the First or Second Divisions. By contrast, in the late 1970s Ayr United played in the then-top tier of Scottish league football with Kilmarnock in the division below. Following Kilmarnock's relegation from the Premiership in 2020–21, the two clubs will share a division for the first time in 28 years in the following season. Kilmarnock would win the first derby of the season on both clubs' opening league day, winning 2–0 at Rugby Park.

== Ayrshire Cup ==
The two clubs have both won this local competition on many occasions, but the last time it was contested was in 1998, when Kilmarnock won 4–2 at Rugby Park after trailing 2–0 at half time. This match was made even more special with Kilmarnock left back Dylan Kerr jumping into the Moffat Stand to celebrate his superb strike to make it 3–2. The trophy has been won by Kilmarnock on 42 occasions and by Ayr United on 27.

== Other matches ==
Between 2003 and 2005, a series of annual one-off friendly matches were held in October, sponsored by a local commercial radio station and named the West Sound Trophy. Kilmarnock won the first match at Rugby Park 1–0; the following year at Somerset Park Ayr United won on penalties, having earlier been 2–0 behind; and in the final match Kilmarnock won 4–0 at home. Kilmarnock and Ayr United played on July 4th, 2025, for a testimonial game in honour of Rory McKenzie. Kilmarnock took the lead through a goal by Greg Kiltie in the 47th minute, and held their lead for a 1–0 win.
