= Dean F.C. =

Association football club in Kilmarnock, Scotland

Dean
- Full name: Dean Football Club
- Founded: 1874
- Dissolved: 1881
- Ground: Hillhead
- Captain: R. Loudon
Home colours

Dean Football Club, sometimes referred to as Kilmarnock Dean, was an association football club from Kilmarnock in Ayrshire.

== History ==
The club was founded in 1874 and took its name from a castle near Kilmarnock. As the club had its meetings at Robertson's Temperance Hotel, it may have had links with the Temperance Movement. The club only ever played 7 competitive fixtures; 4 in the Scottish Cup and 3 in the Ayrshire Cup. The club lost 6 of these fixtures. The biggest recorded win for the club is a 3–0 home win against St Andrew's of Kilmarnock in a friendly in 1875.

Its Scottish Cup results grew progressively worse in its first three years of entry. In 1876–77, the club was let down by its nominated umpire, in a 3–2 defeat against Girvan played at Eglinton Park in Ayr; the Dean players disputed the winner for Girvan, which the Girvan umpire had given as a goal, but, as the Dean umpire could not make up his mind either way, the referee gave the goal.

The following season the club lost 6–0 at Kilbirnie, the home team penning Dean in its goal area for 35 minutes before the first goal. In 1878–79 the club suffered its worst defeat, 9–0 to Portland.

Its last Scottish Cup tie, in 1879–80, against Mauchline at Holm Quarry (the home of Kilmarnock Athletic), ended 3–1 to the village side, Alex Robertson scoring Dean's only competitive goal when the club was 2–0 down.

The club's first Ayrshire Cup tie came in the first season of the competition. Dean was favoured to beat the newly founded Hawthorn club at home, but, in a "very fast" game, the visitors won 1–0. In 1878–79, the club lost 1–0 at the village side of Coylton Coila.

In the 1879–80 competition the club finally avoided a defeat, drawing 0–0 against Mauchline in the first round, but the club was then disqualified, as the Ayrshire Football Association found the club at fault for not arranging a replay within the competition deadline.

The club did not enter the Ayrshire Cup again, and the last known reference to the club is its being drawn at home to Auchinleck Boswell in the 1881–82 Scottish Cup.

== Colours ==
The club wore royal blue shirts and white knickerbockers.

== Ground ==
The club played at Hillhead, off Kilmaurs Road.
