= Winton F.C. (Kilmarnock) =

Association football club in Kilmarnock, Scotland

Winton
- Full name: Winton Football Club
- Founded: 1875
- Dissolved: 1877
- Ground: Dundonald Road
- President: John Watson
- Secretary: Hugh Gibson
- Captain: J. Whyte, William Kennedy
Home colours

Winton Football Club was an association football club from Kilmarnock in Ayrshire.

== History ==
The club was founded in 1875, out of a cricket club. Its first recorded fixture was at Kilmarnock Dean on 2 October 1875, which the Dean won 3–0.

Winton entered the 1876–77 Scottish Cup, and was drawn away to Mauchline. The home side had the advantage of the wind in the first half, and were 2–0 up at the change of ends. The key moment in the match was soon after half-time when Winton had a free-kick for handball right in front of the Mauchline goal, but put the ball straight through, as the Mauchline defence "drew back to give it a clear passage"; under the laws at the time, all free-kicks were indirect. Mauchline's better combination play saw it score a further three goals afterwards.

The final fixture noted for Winton was also against Mauchline, in April 1877, the club gaining a measure of rehabilitation with a goalless draw in "one of the fastest and most exciting games played this season in Kilmarnock", with Winton having a goal disputed because of "hands"; the performance was all the more promising because Winton played the game one man short.

The climax of the 1876–77 season in Ayrshire was a charity match on 5 May between an Ayrshire select and a Glasgow select, in order to raise funds for a statue in honour of Robert Burns, held at the Kilmarnock Cricket Club's Holm Quarry ground. The Ayrshire side contained two Winton players (J. Whyte and W. Smith). The Ayrshire Football Association was formed the following week, of which Winton was a founder member.

The final match involving Winton was a friendly between Rangers and a combination side made up of Winton and Portland players, on the latter's ground, to raise money for unemployed weavers in Newmilns.

Possibly because of the success of the Ayrshire v Glasgow match, the Kilmarnock Cricket Club decided to add a football section, and, instead of forming a new side, the K.C.C. merged with Winton, to form a new club, the Kilmarnock Football And Cricket Club, including a number of the Winton players, such as Whyte, Cunningham, Smith, and captain Kennedy. The new club was granted membership of the Scottish Football Association in time for the 1877–78 Scottish Cup. The new club swiftly changed its name to Kilmarnock Athletic, under which it had considerable success.

== Colours ==
The club's colours were blue and white.

== Ground ==
The club played at Southdean, on Dundonald Road, near the New Cemetery.
