= Girvan F.C. (1874) =

Association football club in Scotland

Girvan
- Full name: Girvan Football Club
- Founded: 1874
- Dissolved: 1886
- Ground: Shore Park
- Secretary: Alexander Thompson
Home colours

Girvan Football Club was a Scottish football club based in the town of Girvan, South Ayrshire.

== History ==
The club was formed in 1874, with matches being reported in the 1875–76 season.

Girvan entered the Scottish Cup from 1876 to 1880, but scratched from its last three entries. Its first run in the competition, in 1876–77, was its best. In the first round, the club beat Dean of Kilmarnock, at the ground of Ayr Eglinton, 3–2; Dean disputed one of the goals for offside, but Dean's own nominated umpire could not give a decision either way, and the referee allowed the goal. In the second round Girvan beat Queen of the South Wanderers, at Newton Stewart, 4–0 in a "one-sided game". The run came to an end in the third round of fixtures, which involved 21 clubs, with a 3–0 defeat against Lancefield of Glasgow played in Ayr.

The club played in the first round in 1877–78, but lost 6–0 at home to a strong Mauchline side.

The club subsequently had a low-key existence, often playing reserve sides, until the 1885–86 season. It entered the Ayrshire Cup intermittently from the first competition in 1877–78 until 1886–87, but scratched from most of its entries, and only ever won one match (4–0 at home to Ochiltree in 1879). The club's final match in the competition was at Ayr F.C.'s Beresford Park in 1885–86, and Girvan, "to the surprise of all", took the lead after 2 minutes, but turned around at half-time 6–1 down, and only just kept the score out of double figures.

== Colours ==
The club played in blue jerseys with white knickerbockers.

== Ground ==
The club originally played on public parks, before moving to Shore Field by 1879. The club's final ground was the Stair Park cricket ground.
