= Ayr Academicals F.C. =

Former association football club in Scotland

Ayr Academicals
- Full name: Ayr Academicals Football Club
- Founded: 1876
- Dissolved: 1879
- Ground: Springvale Park
- Secretary: John Watt
Home colours

Ayr Academicals Football Club was a football team from the Scottish town of Ayr.

== History ==
The club was founded in October 1876, at a meeting at the Ayr Assembly Rooms, in which it was "unanimously agreed" to merge the Ayr Academy and Ayr Eglinton clubs, to form a new club, Ayr Academicals. The new club's secretary was to be the Eglinton secretary John Watt, with Eglinton captain John Holm captaining the Academicals side. The two clubs had previously been close, the Eglinton side which had played in the Scottish Cup earlier in the season including at least 5 players who had played for Ayr Academy in friendlies the previous season, 4 of whom had played in the academy side which beat Eglinton 2–0 in November 1875.

The new side entered the Scottish Cup in 1877–78, reaching the third round (last 34); in the second round the club beat Kilmarnock. The club was also a founder member of the Ayrshire Football Association and entered the first Ayrshire Cup, losing in the first round to Kilbirnie.

In 1878–79, the club lost in the second round of the Scottish Cup to Mauchline, the club which had beaten the Academicals the previous year. The club did go further in the Ayrshire Cup; in the first round the club walked over Ayr Thistle and was eliminated in the fourth round (the final 6) by Kilmarnock Portland, the Portland side defending a one-goal lead through time-wasting tactics, continually sending the ball "into 'touch'".

The club entered the Scottish Cup for 1879–80, and was drawn to play Kilmarnock. This appears to have been a speculative entry, perhaps as a back-up plan, as the football club no longer existed. In April 1879, the club had merged with Ayr Thistle to form Ayr F.C., in time for a friendly match against Calthorpe F.C. of Birmingham, which was touring Scotland over Easter, and to whom Archie Hunter had recommended Ayr Thistle as an opponent. The name Ayr Academical (in the singular) survived as an athletics club.

== Colours ==
The club played in navy shirts with a white Maltese cross badge, and white knickerbockers.

== Grounds ==
At the initial foundation meeting, the club secured the use of the Cattle Show Ground, close to Ayr railway station, from the owner Mr Dewar. From its second season the club played at Springvale Park.

The club experimented with floodlit football in 1878, but the match (against Glasgow University F.C.) was not a success, thanks to continual rain causing intermittent blackouts.
