= 1877–78 Scottish Cup =

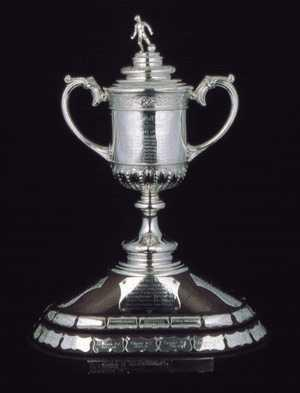
- The Scottish Cup trophy

Tournament details
- Country: Scotland
- Teams: 116

Final positions
- Champions: Vale of Leven (second title)
- Runners-up: 3rd Lanark RV

Tournament statistics
- Matches played: 134
- Goals scored: 422 (3.15 per match)

The 1877–78 Scottish Cup – officially the Scottish Football Association Challenge Cup – was the fifth season of Scotland's most prestigious football knockout competition. For the first time, over 100 teams took part in the competition which began with the first round on 22 September 1877. The cup was won by Vale of Leven for a second time after they defeated Glasgow club 3rd Lanark RV 1–0 in the final on 30 March 1878.

Heart of Midlothian and Hibernian were drawn to face each other in the first round in what would be the first competitive Edinburgh derby. Hibernian won 2–1 after a replay.

== Calendar ==
The exact dates of some matches are unknown as newspaper coverage of football in the late 19th century was not as comprehensive as it would become.

Round	First match date	Fixtures			Clubs
Round	First match date	Original	Byes	Replays	Clubs
First round	22 September 1877	55	4	3	116 → 61
Second round	20 October 1877	28	5	5	61 → 34
Third round	10 November 1877	16	2	2	34 → 19
Fourth round	1 December 1877	9	1	3	19 → 12
Fifth round	22 December 1877	6	0	0	12 → 6
Quarter-finals	12 January 1878	3	0	0	6 → 3
Semi-finals	9 March 1878	1	1	2	3 → 2
Final	30 March 1878	1	0	0	2 → 1

- 2 teams qualified for the second round after drawing their first round replay.
- 2 teams qualified for the third round after drawing their second round replay.
- 2 teams qualified for the fourth round after drawing their third round replay.
- Barrhead were disqualified after winning their fourth round match against Partick, due to discrepancies in their third round match against Renfrew. Both Renfrew and Partick were reinstated.

== Teams ==
All 116 teams entered the competition in the first round.

Ayrshire	Dunbartonshire	Glasgow and Suburbs		Renfrewshire
Ayr Academicals; Ayr Thistle; Beith; Catrine; Cumnock; Dean; Girvan; Hurlford; Kilbirnie; Kilmarnock; Kilmarnock Cricket and Football Club; Kilmarnock Portland; Mauchline; Maybole Carrick; Maybole Thistle; St Andrew's; Tarbolton Burntonians; Vale of Calder	Alclutha; Alexandria; Dumbarton; Helensburgh; Kilmaronock Thistle; Lennox; Milngavie; Renton; Renton Thistle; Star of Leven; Vale of Leven; Vale of Leven Rovers; Waverley; 10th Dumbarton RV	Ailsa; Albatross; Alexandra Athletic; Blackfriars; Blythswood; Caledonian; Clyde; Clydesdale; Craig Park; Dennistoun; Derby; Dumbreck; Govan; Havelock; Hyde Park Locomotive Works; John Elder; Jordanhill; Kelvinbank; Lancefield; Lenzie; Northern; Our Boys; Oxford; Parkgrove	Partick; Petershill; Pollokshields Athletic; Possilpark; Queen's Park; Queen's Park Juniors; Ramblers; Rangers; Rosslyn; Rovers; Sandyford; Shaftesbury; South Western; Stonefield; Strathclyde; Telegraphists; Union; West End; Whiteinch; Winton; 1st Lanark RV; 3rd Lanark RV; 4th Renfrew RV	Arthurlie; Barrhead; Busby; Glenkilloch; Levern; Morton; Pollokshaws; Port Glasgow; Renfrew; Thornliebank; Wellington Park; 17th Renfrew RV; 23rd Renfrew RV
Edinburgh	Forfarshire	Galloway	Lanarkshire	Stirlingshire
Edinburgh Thistle; Hanover; Heart of Midlothian; Hibernian; Swifts; 3rd Edinburgh RV	Dunfermline; Dunmore; St Clement's	Queen of the South Wanderers; Stranraer	Airdrie; Avondale; Drumpellier; Glengowan; Hamilton; Mount Vernon; Newmains; Shotts; Stonelaw; Uddingston	Clifton & Strathfillan; Grasshoppers; Shaugraun

== First round ==
=== Matches ===
==== Glasgow and Suburbs ====
Caledonian received a bye to the second round.

22 September 1877	Oxford	0–1	Sandyford	Crosshill
				Stadium: Queen's Park

22 September 1877	Partick	2–0	Union	Partick
				Stadium: Inchview

22 September 1877	Jordanhill	1–0	Queen's Park Juniors	Glasgow
				Stadium: Anniesland Park

29 September 1877	South Western	8–0	Our Boys	Glasgow
				Stadium: Copeland Park

29 September 1877	Govan	6–0	Albatross	Govan
				Stadium: Moore Park

29 September 1877	Clyde	0–1	3rd Lanark RV	Glasgow
				Stadium: Barrowfield Park

29 September 1877	Ramblers	0–1	Stonefield	Crosshill
				Stadium: Lorne Park

29 September 1877	Northern	3–0	Pollokshields Athletic	Glasgow
				Stadium: Hyde Park

29 September 1877	Petershill	2–3	Kelvinbank	Glasgow
				Stadium: Avenue Park

29 September 1877	Strathclyde	5–1	West End	Rutherglen
				Stadium: Private Park

29 September 1877	Lenzie	2–0	Ailsa	Lenzie
				Stadium: Lenzie Football Field

29 September 1877	Alexandra Athletic	2–0	Lancefield	Glasgow
				Stadium: Kennyhill Park

29 September 1877	Clydesdale	3–0	Dennistoun	Pollokshields
				Stadium: Titwood

29 September 1877	1st Lanark RV	1–0	Blythswood	Glasgow
				Stadium: Burnbank Park

29 September 1877	Telegraphists	1–0	4th Renfrew RV	Govan
				Stadium: Woodville Park

29 September 1877	Havelock	6–0	Craig Park	Govan
				Stadium: Middleton Park

29 September 1877	Rovers	0–0	John Elder	Crosshill
				Stadium: Victoria Road

29 September 1877	Queen's Park	9–0	Whiteinch	Crosshill
				Stadium: Hampden Park

6 October 1877	Shaftesbury	2–3	Rosslyn	Partick
				Stadium: Ashton Park

6 October 1877	Rangers	13–0	Possilpark	Kinning Park
	Ricketts; Hill (x2); J. Campbell (x2); Marshall (x2); Watson (x2); McNeil; P. Campbell (x3)			Stadium: Kinning Park

Parkgrove	w/o	Winton

Derby	w/o	Dumbreck

Blackfriars	w/o	Hyde Park Locomotive Works

==== Renfrewshire district ====
17th Renfrew RV received a bye to the second round.

29 September 1877	Glenkilloch	2–0	Wellington Park	Neilston
				Stadium: Butterwell Park

29 September 1877	Renfrew	0–0	Pollokshaws	Renfrew
				Stadium: Glebe Park

29 September 1877	Levern	0–1	23rd Renfrew RV	Hurlet
				Stadium: Wellington Park

29 September 1877	Barrhead	7–0	Morton	Barrhead
				Stadium: Beacon's Field

29 September 1877	Arthurlie	3–0	Busby	Barrhead
				Stadium: Arthurlie Cross

29 September 1877	Port Glasgow	0–1	Thornliebank	Port Glasgow
				Stadium: Dubbs Farm

==== Lanarkshire district ====
22 September 1877	Newmains	1–3	Uddingston	Newmains
				Stadium: Brown Street

29 September 1877	Stonelaw	1–1	Airdrie	Rutherglen
				Stadium: Burnside Park

6 October 1877	Hamilton	1–0	Avondale	Hamilton
				Stadium: South Avenue

6 October 1877	Shotts	2–3	Drumpellier	Shotts
				Stadium: Calderhead

6 October 1877	Glengowan	2–1	Mount Vernon	Caldercruix
				Stadium: Little Dumbreck

==== Dunbartonshire district ====
29 September 1877	Alexandria	0–2	Milngavie	Alexandria
				Stadium: Balloch Road

29 September 1877	10th Dumbarton RV	1–0	Star of Leven	Kirkintilloch
				Stadium: Holm Park

29 September 1877	Dumbarton	4–0	Waverley	Dumbarton
	Lawrence (x2); Anderson; McMaster			Stadium: Townend

6 October 1877	Helensburgh	0–2	Lennox	Helensburgh
				Stadium: Kirkmichael Park

6 October 1877	Renton Thistle	2–0	Alclutha	Renton
				Stadium: Southend Park

Renton	w/o	Vale of Leven Rovers

Vale of Leven	w/o	Kilmaronock Thistle

==== Ayrshire district ====
29 September 1877	Kilmarnock Cricket and Football Club	4–0	Maybole Thistle	Kilmarnock
				Stadium: Holm Quarry

29 September 1877	Girvan	0–6	Mauchline	Girvan
				Stadium: Public Park

29 September 1877	Catrine	0–1	Beith	Catrine
				Stadium: Burn Park

29 September 1877	Cumnock	0–1	Kilmarnock Portland	Cumnock
				Stadium: Greenmill Holm

29 September 1877	Maybole Carrick	1–1	Tarbolton Burntonians	Maybole
				Stadium: Myremill Holm

29 September 1877	Kilmarnock	5–1	Hurlford	Kilmarnock
				Stadium: The Grange

29 September 1877	Kilbirnie	6–0	Dean	Kilbirnie
				Stadium: Stonyholm Park

29 September 1877	Ayr Academicals	4–1	Vale of Calder	Ayr
				Stadium: Springvale Park

Ayr Thistle	w/o	St Andrew's

==== Edinburgh district ====
29 September 1877	Heart of Midlothian	0–0	Hibernian	Edinburgh
				Stadium: The Meadows

29 September 1877	3rd Edinburgh RV	0–0	Swifts	Edinburgh
				Stadium: Powburn

29 September 1877	Hanover	1–0	Edinburgh Thistle	Edinburgh
				Stadium: East Meadows

==== Forfarshire district ====
Dunmore received a bye to the second round.

St Clement's	w/o	Dunfermline

==== Galloway district ====
6 October 1877	Queen of the South Wanderers	6–0	Stranraer	Dumfries

==== Stirlingshire district ====
Grasshoppers received a bye to the second round.

29 September 1877	Shaugraun	1–2	Clifton & Strathfillan	Campsie

=== Replays ===
==== Glasgow and Suburbs ====
6 October 1877	John Elder	2–2	Rovers	Govan
				Stadium: Fairfield

==== Renfrewshire district ====
6 October 1877	Pollokshaws	0–2	Renfrew	Pollokshaws
				Stadium: Norwood Park

==== Lanarkshire district ====
13 October 1877	Airdrie	0–2	Stonelaw	Partick
				Stadium: Inchview

==== Ayrshire district ====
6 October 1877	Tarbolton Burntonians	0–3	Maybole Carrick	Tarbolton
				Stadium: Langlands Farm

==== Edinburgh district ====
6 October 1877	Hibernian	2–1	Heart of Midlothian	Edinburgh
				Stadium: The Meadows; Attendance: 1,200

6 October 1877	3rd Edinburgh RV	1–2	Swifts	Edinburgh
				Stadium: East Meadows

Notes

1. A-First competitive meeting of Heart of Midlothian and Hibernian.
2. B-Both teams advanced to the second round.

== Second round ==
=== Matches ===
==== Ayrshire and Dumfriesshire district ====
20 October 1877	Ayr Academicals	1–0	Kilmarnock	Ayr
				Stadium: Springvale Park

20 October 1877	Ayr Thistle	0–0	Kilbirnie	Ayr
				Stadium: Robbsland Park

27 October 1877	Beith	1–0	Kilmarnock Portland	Beith
				Stadium: Gateside Toll

27 October 1877	Mauchline	1–0	Kilmarnock Cricket and Football Club	Mauchline
				Stadium: Connell Park

27 October 1877	Maybole Carrick	2–0	Queen of the South Wanderers	Cumnock
				Stadium: Greenmill Holm

==== Forfarshire district ====
27 October 1877	St Clement's	3–0	Dunmore	Dundee
				Stadium: Magdalen Green

==== Dunbartonshire district ====
Renton Thistle received a bye to the third round.

20 October 1877	Lennox	9–0	Milngavie	Dumbarton
				Stadium: Levengrove Park

20 October 1877	Renton	3–0	10th Dumbarton RV	Renton
				Stadium: South Park

20 October 1877	Dumbarton	1–1	Vale of Leven	Dumbarton
				Stadium: Townend; Attendance: 3,000

==== Renfrewshire district ====
Barrhead received a bye to the third round.

20 October 1877	Arthurlie	1–0	17th Renfrew RV	Barrhead
				Stadium: Arthurlie Cross

20 October 1877	23rd Renfrew RV	0–1	Thornliebank	Cathcart
				Stadium: Muirland Park

27 October 1877	Glenkilloch	0–4	Renfrew	Neilston
				Stadium: Butterwell Park

==== Edinburgh district ====
Swifts received a bye to the third round.

20 October 1877	Hanover	1–1	Hibernian	Edinburgh
				Stadium: East Meadows

==== Glasgow and Suburbs ====
Stonefield received a bye to the third round.

20 October 1877	1st Lanark RV	4–0	Telegraphists	Glasgow
				Stadium: Burnbank Park

20 October 1877	Rovers	2–2	Blackfriars	Crosshill
				Stadium: Victoria Road

20 October 1877	Caledonian	1–0	Rosslyn	Glasgow
				Stadium: Burnbank Park

20 October 1877	Clydesdale	0–2	Queen's Park	Polloksheilds
				Stadium: Titwood

20 October 1877	Govan	1–0	John Elder	Govan
				Stadium: Moore Park

20 October 1877	Jordanhill	2–1	Lenzie	Glasgow
				Stadium: Anniesland Park

20 October 1877	Parkgrove	2–1	Kelvinbank	Govan
				Stadium: Trinidad Park

20 October 1877	Partick	8–1	Strathclyde	Partick
				Stadium: Inchview

20 October 1877	Northern	1–2	Sandyford	Glasgow
				Stadium: Hyde Park

20 October 1877	Havelock	2–2	South Western	Govan
				Stadium: Middleton Park

27 October 1877	Rangers	8–0	Alexandra Athletic	Kinning Park
	Dunlop; J. Campbell; McNeil (x3); P. Campbell (x3)			Stadium: Kinning Park

27 October 1877	3rd Lanark RV	11–0	Derby	Crosshill
				Stadium: Cathkin Park

==== Lanarkshire district ====
Drumpellier received a bye to the third round.

20 October 1877	Glengowan	3–1	Stonelaw	Caldercruix
				Stadium: Little Dumbreck

20 October 1877	Hamilton	0–3	Uddingston	Hamilton
				Stadium: South Avenue

==== Stirlingshire district ====
20 October 1877	Grasshoppers	3–0	Clifton & Strathfillan	Callander
				Stadium: Roman Camp

=== Replays ===
==== Ayrshire and Dumfriesshire district ====
27 October 1877	Kilbirnie	3–1	Ayr Thistle	Kilbirnie
				Stadium: Stonyholm Park

==== Dunbartonshire district ====
27 October 1877	Vale of Leven	4–1	Dumbarton	Alexandria
			Meikleham	Stadium: North Street Park; Attendance: 5,000

==== Edinburgh district ====
27 October 1877	Hibernian	3–0	Hanover	Edinburgh
				Stadium: The Meadows

==== Glasgow and Suburbs ====
27 October 1877	Blackfriars	0–0	Rovers	Glasgow
				Stadium: Belvedere Park

27 October 1877	South Western	2–0	Havelock	Govan
				Stadium: Copeland Park

Notes

1. C-Both teams advanced to the third round.

== Third round ==
=== Matches ===
==== Glasgow and Suburbs ====
3 November 1877	Blackfriars	1–1	Rovers	Glasgow
				Stadium: Belvedere Park

10 November 1877	Govan	5–2	Stonefield	Govan
				Stadium: Moore Park

10 November 1877	South Western	4–0	1st Lanark RV	Govan
				Stadium: Copeland Park

10 November 1877	3rd Lanark RV	1–0	Queen's Park	Crosshill
				Stadium: Cathkin Park

10 November 1877	Parkgrove	3–2	Sandyford	Govan
				Stadium: Trinidad Park

10 November 1877	Jordanhill	4–0	Grasshoppers	Glasgow
				Stadium: Anniesland Park

17 November 1877	Caledonian	0–3	Partick	Glasgow
				Stadium: Burnbank Park

==== Lanarkshire district ====
10 November 1877	Rangers	13–0	Uddingston	Kinning Park
	Hill; J. Campbell; Marshall (x4); Watson (x4); McNeil (x2); P. Campbell			Stadium: Kinning Park

10 November 1877	Drumpellier	2–2	Glengowan	Coatbridge
				Stadium: Drumpellier Cricket Ground

==== Renfrewshire district ====
10 November 1877	Renfrew	1–2	Barrhead	Renfrew
				Stadium: Glebe Street

10 November 1877	Arthurlie	0–0	Thornliebank	Barrhead
				Stadium: Arthurlie Cross

==== Dunbartonshire district ====
10 November 1877	Vale of Leven	3–0	Lennox	Alexandria
				Stadium: North Street Park

17 November 1877	Renton	2–0	Renton Thistle	Renton
				Stadium: South Park

==== Ayrshire district ====
Kilbirnie received a bye to the fourth round.

10 November 1877	Ayr Academicals	1–3	Mauchline	Ayr
				Stadium: Springvale Park

10 November 1877	Beith	3–0	Maybole Carrick	Beith
				Stadium: Gateside Toll

==== Edinburgh district ====
St. Clement's received a bye to the fourth round.

10 November 1877	Hibernian	2–0	Swifts	Edinburgh
				Stadium: The Meadows

=== Replays ===
==== Glasgow and Suburbs ====
10 November 1877	Rovers	1–0	Blackfriars	Crosshill
				Stadium: Victoria Road

==== Lanarkshire district ====
17 November 1877	Glengowan	0–0	Drumpellier	Caldercruix
				Stadium: Little Dumbreck

==== Renfrewshire district ====
17 November 1877	Thornliebank	2–0	Arthurlie	Thornliebank
				Stadium: Heatherty Hill

Notes

1. D-Barrhead advanced to the fourth round but were disqualified following their match against Partick. Renfrew were subsequently reinstated in the fifth round.
2. E-Both teams advanced to the fourth round.

== Fourth round ==
Jordanhill received a bye to the fifth round.

=== Matches ===
1 December 1877	Kilbirnie	1–2	Mauchline	Kilbirnie
				Stadium: Stonyholm Park

1 December 1877	Parkgrove	3–1	Drumpellier	Govan
				Stadium: Trinidad Park

1 December 1877	Barrhead	0–0 (Abandoned)	Partick	Barrhead
				Stadium: Beacon's Field

1 December 1877	3rd Lanark RV	7–0	Govan	Crosshill
				Stadium: Cathkin Park

1 December 1877	South Western	5–0	Glengowan	Govan
				Stadium: Copeland Park

1 December 1877	Rangers	0–0	Vale of Leven	Kinning Park
				Stadium: Kinning Park; Attendance: 4,000

1 December 1877	Thornliebank	1–2	Hibernian	Thornliebank
				Stadium: Heatherty Hill

8 December 1877	Renton	4–0	Rovers	Renton
				Stadium: South Park

Beith	w/o	St Clement's

=== Replays ===
8 December 1877	Barrhead	1–0 (Void)	Partick	Barrhead
				Stadium: Beacon's Field

8 December 1877	Hibernian	2–2	Thornliebank	Edinburgh
				Stadium: Mayfield Park

15 December 1877	Vale of Leven	5–0	Rangers	Alexandria
				Stadium: North Street Park; Attendance: 4,000

Notes

1. F-Barrhead's match against Partick was abandoned after 25 minutes after Currie of Partick had his leg broken.
2. G-The result between Thornliebank and Hibernian was considered as a draw by the Scottish Football Association after Thornliebank protested against one of Hibernian's goals.
3. H-Barrhead were disqualified for discrepancies in their third round match against Renfrew. Both Partick and Renfrew were reinstated.
4. I-Both teams advanced to the fifth round.

== Fifth round ==
=== Matches ===
22 December 1877	Vale of Leven	10–0	Jordanhill	Alexandria
				Stadium: North Street Park

29 December 1877	Parkgrove	1–1	Partick	Govan
				Stadium: Trinidad Park

29 December 1877	Hibernian	1–3	South Western	Edinburgh
				Stadium: The Meadows

29 December 1877	Renton	2–1	Thornliebank	Renton
				Stadium: South Park

5 January 1878	Beith	0–4	3rd Lanark RV	Beith
				Stadium: Gateside Toll

5 January 1878	Renfrew	0–2	Mauchline	Renfrew
				Stadium: Glebe Street

=== Replay ===
5 January 1878	Partick	1–2	Parkgrove	Partick
				Stadium: Inchview

== Quarter-finals ==
=== Matches ===
12 January 1878	South Western	1–0 (Void)	3rd Lanark RV	Govan
				Stadium: Copeland Park

19 January 1878	Renton	3–1	Mauchline	Renton
				Stadium: South Park

19 January 1878	Vale of Leven	5–0	Parkgrove	Alexandria
				Stadium: North Street Park

=== Replays ===
19 January 1878	South Western	1–2	3rd Lanark RV	Govan
				Stadium: Copeland Park

== Semi-finals ==
Vale of Leven received a bye to the final.

=== Match ===
16 February 1878	Renton	1–3 (Void)	3rd Lanark RV	Renton
				Stadium: Tontine Park

=== Replay ===
9 March 1878	Renton	1–1 (a.e.t.)	3rd Lanark RV	Renton
				Stadium: Tontine Park

=== Second Replay ===
16 March 1878	3rd Lanark RV	1–0	Renton	Crosshill
				Stadium: Cathkin Park

== Final ==
30 March 1878
15:00

Vale of Leven	1–0	3rd Lanark RV
McDougall 65'

Hampden Park, Crosshill
Attendance: 5,000
Referee: Robert W. Gardner (Glasgow)

== See also ==
- 1877–78 in Scottish football
