= Ramblers F.C. (Scotland) =

Association football club in Glasgow City, Scotland

Ramblers
- Full name: Ramblers Football Club
- Founded: 1874
- Dissolved: 1877
- Ground: Lorne Park
- Secretary: R. Macdougall Jr, Robert Telford
- Captain: Slimmon
Home colours

Ramblers Football Club was a 19th-century football club based in Glasgow.

== History ==
The club was founded in 1874. Its first recorded match was a 0–0 draw with Burnbank, and its first recorded goal and win came at Hamilton Academical the following month.

The Ramblers entered the Scottish Cup for the first time in 1875–76. The club was drawn away to Northern and lost by 4 goals, plus one disputed goal, to nil. The club entered the competition three times in total, losing in the first round on every occasion - its other appearances being a 6–0 (plus one disputed) loss at 3rd Lanarkshire Rifle Volunteers in 1876–77, and a 1–0 defeat at home to Stonefield in 1877–78, in a "hard but pleasant game".

The club recorded winning 10 of its 18 matches in the 1876–77 season, and boasted a membership of 50 that season; however the club's last advertised match was against Blythswood in December 1877, but there is no report that the match took place. The final recorded match was a 2–0 defeat at Stonelaw the previous month, against a scratch side rather than the regular Stonelaw XI.

== Colours ==
The club wore blue and black jerseys, white knickers, and blue and black hose.

== Grounds ==
The club played originally at Queen's Park. By 1876 the club had a private ground at Lorne Park, on Victoria Road, Crosshill, Glasgow, shared with Pollokshields Athletic.
