= Winton F.C. =

Winton F.C. may refer to:

- Winton F.C. (Kilmarnock)
- Winton F.C. (Glasgow), later Apsley F.C.

== See also ==
- Ardrossan Winton Rovers F.C.
