= Thornhill F.C. (1875) =

Former association football club in Scotland

Thornhill
- Full name: Thornhill Football Club
- Founded: 1875
- Dissolved: 1880
- Ground: Thornhill Park
- Secretary: Thomas Morton
- President: John Steele Esq.
Home colours

Thornhill Football Club was a Scottish association football club based in the town of Blantyre, Lanarkshire.

== History ==
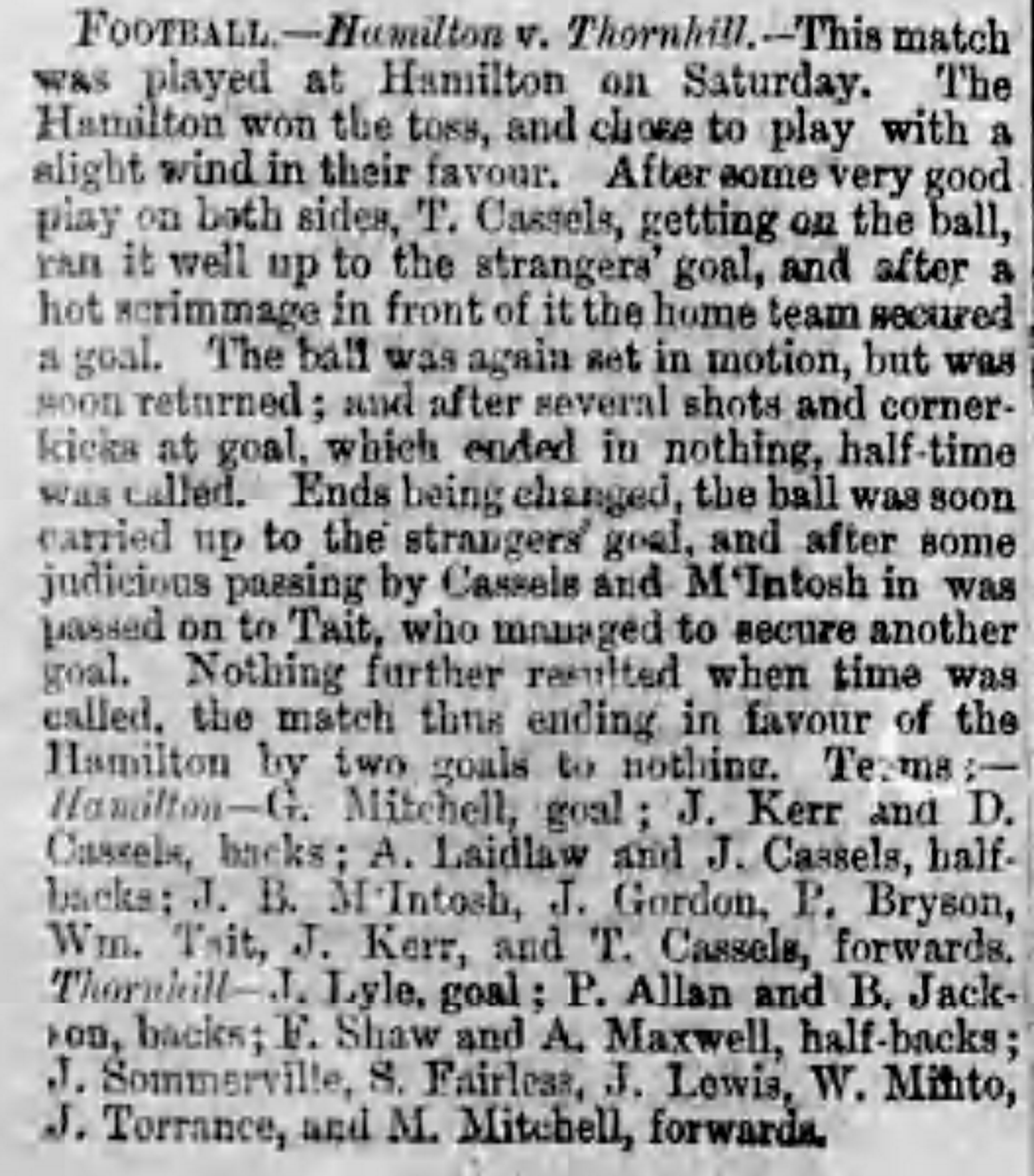
Hamilton 2–0 Thornhill, Scottish Cup 1st Round, 1876–77, from the 7 October 1876 edition of the Hamilton Advertiser

The club was founded in late 1875 and took its name from Thornhill Park, where it played its matches. It was one of the first ten senior clubs in Lanarkshire and, with 36 members in its first season, a mid-sized club; with a record of 3 wins, 1 draw, and 4 defeats in its first season, it was also of middling standard. The club's opponents in that first season included Hamilton Academical, and goals from captain W. Minto, Morrison, and Tennant secured Thornhill a 3–0 win over the Accies.

In 1876, Thornhill entered the third edition of the Scottish Cup, and lost 2–0 at Hamilton in the first round, but picked up with a 4–0 friendly win over Avondale of Strathaven a week later.

The last reference to the club playing as the Thornhill is against Shotts at Christmas 1876, For 1877 the club seems to have changed its name to Blantyre, given that the Blantyre club members included players such as Begg, Minto, Maxwell, and Robert Jackson, who were also Thornhill players. However Blantyre played at a junior level, and only on rare occasions, until its last recorded matches in 1879–80.

== Colours ==
The club wore white jerseys, with a red × and monogram, white knickers, and red stockings.

== Ground ==
The club's ground was at Thornhill Park and described as "excellent".
