= Ayr Thistle F.C. =

Former association football club in Scotland

Ayr Thistle
- Full name: Ayr Thistle Football Club
- Founded: 1872
- Dissolved: 1879
- Ground: Low Green (1872–1875); Thistle Park (1875–1876); Robbsland Park (1876–1879)
- Secretary: John Blair, Thomas Sym
Home colours

Ayr Thistle Football Club was a Scottish football team from the town of Ayr.

== History ==
Founded in 1872 out of a cricket club, Ayr Thistle originally played the rugby football code, but switched to association football thanks to the influence of Queen's Park. The earliest recorded match for the club was in October 1874, a 3–0 defeat to Mauchline at Low Green. The club was the biggest in Ayr in 1876, with 52 members, and one of the biggest in the county.

The club first entered the Scottish Cup in 1875–76, losing 1–0 to Kilbirnie. The following season, Thistle reached the semi-final. All of the club's victories were 1–0 wins; the second round saw revenge over Kilbirnie and the third round a surprise 1–0 win over Dumbreck, after an Aitken cross was only half-cleared by M'Geoch and Henry "cleverly shot it through". The club's fourth round tie with Partick ended 1–1, but Partick was disqualified for "neglecting to take advantage of the dates fixed by the Association for playing their tie" - presumably not agreeing a replay date. That put the Thistle into the quarter-final, and the club secured a replay win over Lancefield, Hugh Cunningham scoring the winner with a quarter of an hour to go, after the original tie in Govan ended 2–2.

The run ended with Thistle being defeated 9–0 by Vale of Leven at a snowy Kinning Park, then home of Rangers. Thistle did not concede until the 32nd minute, and the score was still only 2–0 at half-time, the second of which had been a Vale counter-attack; Vale's superior fitness told in the second half and two further Vale goals were counted as disputed.

After Ayr Eglinton and Ayr Academy merged to form Ayr Academicals in 1876, Thistle was briefly only the second largest club in town. Thistle was much the more active club, playing nearly three times as many matches, and in April 1878 being the first club in the town to play an English club, hosting Nottingham Forest - the game unfortunately affected by Aitken breaking his collarbone early on and Forest running out 3–0 winners. However Thistle suffered a blow before the 1878–79 season when captain Archie Hunter was "poached" by Aston Villa, and the club only won one more Cup tie (against Auchinleck Boswell in the first round in the 1878–79 Scottish Cup). Its final competitive match - a 3–1 defeat to Beith in the second round of the Cup - had a bizarre aftermath with a hoaxer convincing one paper that the referee had agreed to chalk off one of the Beith goals.

After the Thistle was drawn to play the Academicals in the 1878–79 Ayrshire Cup, the two Ayr clubs agreed to form the Ayr Club, the new club's secretary being the Academicals' secretary Robert Highet. In 1910, Ayr merged with Ayr Parkhouse to form Ayr United.

The Ayr Thistle name was twice revived in the 1880s for unrelated clubs.

== Colours ==
The club's colours were blue and black jerseys with white knickers.

== Grounds ==
The club played at the Low Green, before moving to Thistle Park in 1875 and eventually Robbsland Park in 1876.

== Notable players ==
- Archie Hunter, later an FA Cup winner with Aston Villa, played as a back for Thistle in the 1876–77 season
