= 17th Renfrewshire Rifle Volunteers F.C. =

Association football club in Greenock, Scotland

17th R.R.V.
- Full name: 17th Renfrewshire Rifle Volunteers Football Club
- Founded: 1877
- Dissolved: 1881
- Ground: Barr Castle Park
- Hon. secretary: John R. MacDowell
1877–79 colours	1879–81 colours

The 17th Renfrewshire Rifle Volunteers Football Club was a 19th-century association football club based in Lochwinnoch, Renfrewshire, Scotland.

== History ==
The club was formed out of a company in the Volunteer movement of the British Army. The Volunteers included sporting activities within their purview and newspapers often carried reports of such activities. The growth of football in Scotland, especially thanks to Queen's Park F.C., and the success of army teams in England such as the Royal Engineers A.F.C., encouraged regiments to form football clubs as part of the physical regimen. The 17th division was part of the 2nd Administrative Battalion of the Renfrewshire RV.

The 17th R.R.V. was formed in 1877 with 37 members and joined the Scottish Football Association in September 1877. The club had already played its first match, a 4–0 defeat at Kilbirnie in August.

The Volunteers entered the Scottish Cup every year from 1877–78 to 1880–81. It won two first round ties, in 1879–80 against Levern, and in 1880–81 against Wellington Park; the 6–1 win against the latter was the club's biggest recorded victory. The 17th lost its second round tie both times, its final tie being a 3–2 defeat to St Mirren.

As a member of the Renfrewshire association, the 17th also entered the first three editions of the Renfrewshire Cup, from 1878–79 to 1880–81, but lost in the first round each time. Its final defeat, 5–1 at home to Thornliebank, was the club's last recorded match.

By the time of the club's final competition entries, more clubs with a wider constituency were starting up, and the club does not re-emerge after the 1880–81 season. In 1881, a new club, Lochwinnoch F.C., was founded to represent the village, playing at the same ground, and not being solely reliant on the volunteer forces.

== Colours ==
The club originally wore blue and white inch-striped jerseys and hose, with white knickers. In 1879 the club changed to red jerseys and white knickers.

== Grounds ==
The club's first ground was at Barr Castle Park, Garthland, ¾ of a mile from Lochwinnoch railway station, and used the Temperance Hotel for facilities. In 1878 it moved to Field Park, Calderhaugh, half-a-mile from the station, with the Wheat Sheaf Hotel now providing facilities.
