= Sandyford F.C. =

Association football club in Glasgow City, Scotland

Sandyford
- Full name: Sandyford Football Club
- Founded: 1874
- Dissolved: 1877
- Ground: Brighton Park
- Secretary: John Hamilton
- Captain: Cairns
Home colours

Sandyford Football Club was a 19th-century football club based in the west of Glasgow.

== History ==
The club was founded in 1874. Its first recorded match was against Northern in November, resulting in a 1–0 defeat.

Sandyford entered the Scottish Cup for the first time in 1875–76. The club made it through the first round, thanks to two draws with the 23rd Renfrew Rifle Volunteers, and the rule at the time that teams advanced after two draws. In the second round, the club lost 3–0 at the Western club, despite the efforts of goalkeeper Watt, new captain Tait at the back, and the left-wingers Bryce and Jamison being particularly praised.

In 1876–77 the club had an unlucky draw in the first round, at the near-unbeatable Queen's Park; the Spiders duly won 7–0, six of the goals coming in the first half when the home side had the advantage of the wind.

The club's best run came in its last entry in 1877–78, beating Oxford 1–0 and Northern, both at Brighton Park, to reach the third round, made up of 34 clubs. The tie with Northern appears to be contentions as two reports give different scores; one that Sandyford won 2–1, and the other that it was a 1–1 draw, both reports stating Sandyford had scored a disputed goal as well. As Sandyford was put into the third round, the dispute was resolved in its favour. In the third, Sandyford lost 3–2 at Parkgrove after a "splendidly contested game".

In the 1876–77 season, the club played 15 times, winning 9, but with only 40 members was one of the smaller Senior sides in Glasgow, with Rangers, Govan, and Parkgrove close by being more active and with larger memberships. The final fixtures advertised for the club in late 1877 were for the second XI, and the Parkgrove tie is the last recorded fixture for the club.

== Colours ==
The club wore navy blue shirts, white knickers, and royal blue and white stockings.

== Grounds ==
The club originally played at Kelvinbank Park. By 1876 it had moved to Sandyford Park, near Overnewton Station. In 1877 it moved south of the Clyde, to play at Brighton Park, in Govan.
