= Stonefield F.C. =

Former association football club in Glasgow City, Scotland

Stonefield
- Full name: Stonefield Football Club
- Founded: 1871
- Dissolved: 1879
- Ground: Barrowfield Park
- Owner: Secretary
- Chairman: John Macmillan
Home colours

Stonefield Football Club was a 19th-century football club based in Glasgow, Scotland.

== History ==
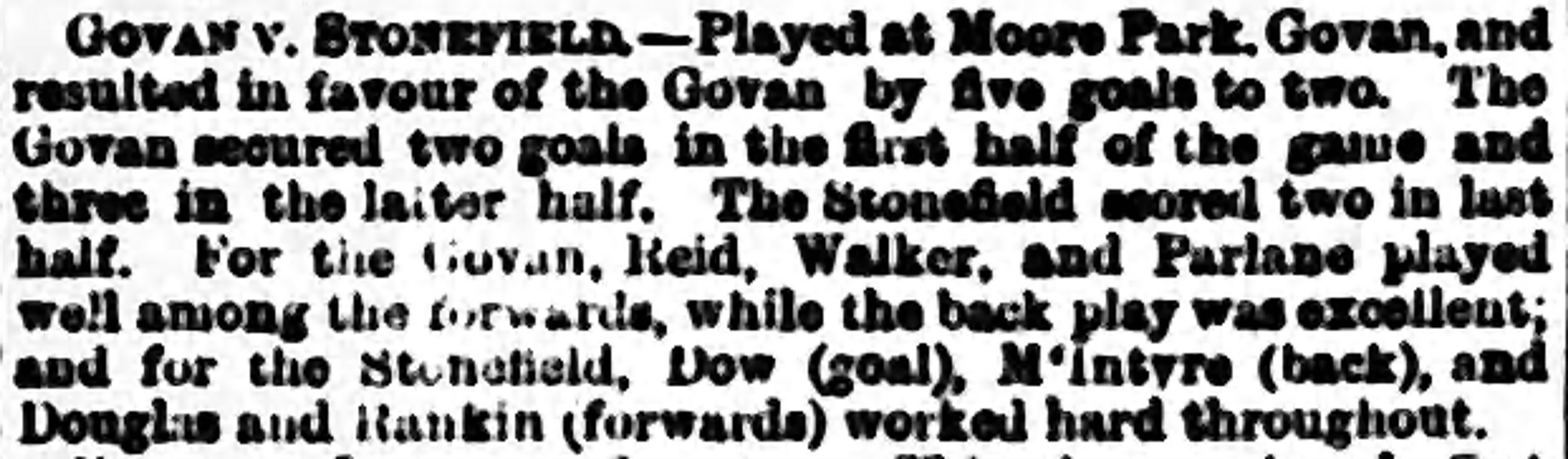
Govan 5–2 Stonefield, 1877–78 Scottish Cup Third Round, North British Daily Mail 12 November 1877

The club claimed a foundation date of 1871. However its first recorded match was in February 1876 and it did not join the Scottish Football Association until the 1877–78 season. As this is after the previous club playing at Barrowfield Park (Eastern) broke up, the club may have had an influx of members from that club, with others having joined the new (and larger) Clyde club, which also played at Barrowfield.

Stonefield first entered the Scottish Cup in 1877–78. It beat Ramblers in a "hard but pleasant game" thanks to a goal from William Reid. After a bye in the second round, Stonefield went out in the third round, 5–2 at Govan. One of the players noted for his play (McIntyre) may have been James McIntyre of Eastern.

In the 1878–79 Scottish Cup the club walked over the 4th R.R.V. in the first round but lost 4–0 against the John Elder works side at Dalmarnock Park in the second. It was the club's last competitive match, as it dissolved before playing Harmonic in the first round in the 1879–80 Scottish Cup.

There is one further match recorded for a club named Stonefield, in June 1880, played on Glasgow Green, but this appears to be a separate club lacking its own ground.

== Colours ==
The club played in blue jerseys, stockings, and cap with white knickerbockers.

== Stadium ==
The club played at Barrowfield Park, which was also known informally as Glengarry Park, after the open space next to the roped-off area.
