= 2021–22 Scottish Championship =

Scottish Championship
- Season: 2021–22
- Dates: 31 July 2021 – 29 April 2022
- Champions: Kilmarnock
- Promoted: Kilmarnock
- Relegated: Dunfermline Athletic; Queen of the South
- Matches: 180
- Goals: 432 (2.4 per match)
- Top goalscorer: Michael McKenna (15 goals)
- Biggest home win: Greenock Morton 5–0 Dunfermline Athletic (8 January 2022)
- Biggest away win: Hamilton Academical 1–6 Partick Thistle (15 October 2021); Greenock Morton 1–6 Inverness CT (11 December 2021)
- Highest scoring: Raith Rovers 4–4 Hamilton Academical (31 July 2021)
- Longest winning run: Inverness CT; 5 games
- Longest unbeaten run: Raith Rovers; 13 games
- Longest winless run: Dunfermline Athletic; 13 games
- Longest losing run: Queen of the South; 6 games
- Highest attendance: 11,500; Kilmarnock 2–1 Arbroath (22 April 2022)
- Lowest attendance: 197; Queen of the South 0–3 Hamilton Academical (2 January 2022)

The 2021–22 Scottish Championship (known as the cinch Championship for sponsorship reasons) was the ninth season of the Scottish Championship and the 114th of second tier football in Scotland. The league was contested by 10 teams – Arbroath, Ayr United, Dunfermline Athletic, Greenock Morton, Hamilton Academical, Inverness Caledonian Thistle, Kilmarnock, Partick Thistle, Queen of the South and Raith Rovers – and began with the first matches on 31 July 2021. The season concluded with the second leg of the play-off final on 15 May 2022.

Kilmarnock, competing in the Championship for the first time and the second tier for the first time since 1992–93, earned promotion back to the Scottish Premiership at the first time of asking after claiming the league title following a 2–1 comeback win against nearest challengers Arbroath in their penultimate match. It was their first second-tier title since 1898–99. Inverness Caledonian Thistle defeated Partick Thistle and Arbroath in the Premiership play-offs but lost 6–2 on aggregate to St Johnstone in the play-off final.

Queen of the South were relegated to Scottish League One following a 1–1 draw against Ayr United in their penultimate match. Dunfermline Athletic were also relegated after losing 1–0 on aggregate to Queen's Park in the Championship play-offs. Queen's Park were subsequently promoted to the Championship after defeating Airdrieonians 3–2 on aggregate in the play-off final.

In total, 432 goals were scored across the 180 matches during the league season and Arbroath's Michael McKenna was the top scorer with 15 goals.

== Background ==
The Scottish Championship sits as the second-tier of the Scottish Professional Football League (SPFL) and of the Scottish football pyramid. It was formed in 2013 following the merger of the Scottish Premier League (SPL) and the Scottish Football League (SFL). A second-tier competition had existed in Scotish football since 1893–94, save for a few years when it was suspended during World War I and World War II. This would be the ninth season of the Championship and the 114th season of second-tier competition.

Falkirk and St Johnstone were the most successful teams in second-tier competition, having both won seven previous titles. Of the teams who would contest the Championship in 2021–22, Ayr United, Greenock Morton, Raith Rovers and Partick Thistle were the most successful, having each won six previous titles.

=== Team changes ===
After one season in the Championship, Heart of Midlothian won the previous season's title and earned promotion back to the Scottish Premiership. Hamilton Academical were automatically relegated from the Premiership after a 2–0 defeat on the final day of the season. In the Premiership play-offs, Dundee defeated Kilmarnock 4–2 on aggregate to earn promotion to the Premiership. Kilmarnock were relegated to the Championship as a result, ending a run of 28 years in the top flight.

Similar to Hearts, one season after relegation, Partick Thistle won promotion back to the Championship by winning the Scottish League One title. Alloa Athletic were relegated to League One after finishing bottom of the Championship. In the Championship play-offs, Greenock Morton were earned a repreive from relegation after defeating Airdrieonians 4–0 on aggregate.

=== Sponsorship ===
At the start of the season, used car dealership cinch entered into a five-year agreement with the SPFL, worth around £1.6 million per season, to become the title sponsor of league's four divisions (the Premiership, Championship, League One and League Two).

== Teams ==
=== Stadia and locations ===
| Arbroath | Ayr United | Dunfermline Athletic | Greenock Morton |
|---|---|---|---|
| Gayfield Park | Somerset Park | East End Park | Cappielow |
| Capacity: 6,600 | Capacity: 10,185 | Capacity: 11,480 | Capacity: 11,589 |
| Hamilton Academical | Location of teams in 2021–22 Scottish Championship | | Inverness Caledonian Thistle |
| New Douglas Park | Location of teams in 2021–22 Scottish Championship | | Caledonian Stadium |
| Capacity: 6,018 | Location of teams in 2021–22 Scottish Championship | | Capacity: 7,750 |
| Kilmarnock | Partick Thistle | Queen of the South | Raith Rovers |
| Rugby Park | Firhill Stadium | Palmerston Park | Stark's Park |
| Capacity: 17,889 | Capacity: 10,102 | Capacity: 8,690 | Capacity: 8,867 |

=== Personnel and kits ===
| Team | Manager | Captain | Kit Manufacturer | Shirt Sponsor |
|---|---|---|---|---|
| Arbroath | (Scotland) Dick Campbell | (Scotland) Thomas O'Brien | Macron | Megatech |
| Ayr United | (Scotland) Lee Bullen | (Republic of Ireland) Sean McGinty | Hummel | Bitcoin BCH |
| Dunfermline Athletic | (Scotland) John Hughes | (Scotland) Graham Dorrans | Joma | SRJ Windows |
| Greenock Morton | (Scotland) Dougie Imrie | (South Africa) Kyle Jacobs | est 1874 | McGill's |
| Hamilton Academical | (Scotland) Stuart Taylor | (Scotland) Brian Easton | Adidas | Cullen |
| Inverness Caledonian Thistle | (Scotland) Billy Dodds | (Scotland) Sean Welsh | Puma | ILI Group |
| Kilmarnock | (Scotland) Derek McInnes | (England) Chris Stokes | Hummel | Brownings The Bakers |
| Partick Thistle | (Scotland) Ian McCall | (Scotland) Ross Docherty | O'Neills | Just Employment Law |
| Queen of the South | (Scotland) Willie Gibson | (England) Josh Todd | Macron | Rosefield Salvage |
| Raith Rovers | (Scotland) John McGlynn | (Scotland) Kyle Benedictus | Joma | valmcdermid.com(Home); TAG (Away) |

=== Managerial changes ===
| Team | Outgoing manager | Manner of departure | Date of vacancy | Position in table | Incoming manager | Date of appointment |
|---|---|---|---|---|---|---|
| Inverness Caledonian Thistle | (Scotland) Neil McCann | End of interim spell | 1 May 2021 | Pre-season | (Scotland) Billy Dodds | 1 June 2021 |
| Dunfermline Athletic | (Scotland) Stevie Crawford | Resigned | 18 May 2021 | Pre-season | (Scotland) Peter Grant | 28 May 2021 |
| Hamilton Academical | (Scotland) Brian Rice | Resigned | 11 August 2021 | 5th | (Scotland) Stuart Taylor | 20 August 2021 |
| Ayr United | (Scotland) David Hopkin | Resigned | 9 September 2021 | 9th | (Scotland) Jim Duffy | 9 September 2021 |
| Dunfermline Athletic | (Scotland) Peter Grant | Sacked | 31 October 2021 | 10th | (Scotland) John Hughes | 12 November 2021 |
| Greenock Morton | (Scotland) Gus MacPherson | Sacked | 4 December 2021 | 8th | (Scotland) Dougie Imrie | 21 December 2021 |
| Kilmarnock | (Northern Ireland) Tommy Wright | Sacked | 18 December 2021 | 5th | (Scotland) Derek McInnes | 4 January 2022 |
| Ayr United | (Scotland) Jim Duffy | Sacked | 20 December 2021 | 8th | (Scotland) Lee Bullen | 7 January 2022 |
| Queen of the South | (Scotland) Allan Johnston | Sacked | 13 February 2022 | 10th | (Scotland) Willie Gibson | 13 February 2022 |

== League summary ==
=== League table ===
| Pos | Team | Pld | W | D | L | GF | GA | GD | Pts | Promotion, qualification or relegation |
|---|---|---|---|---|---|---|---|---|---|---|
| 1 | Kilmarnock (C, P) | 36 | 20 | 7 | 9 | 50 | 27 | +23 | 67 | Promotion to the Premiership |
| 2 | Arbroath | 36 | 17 | 14 | 5 | 54 | 28 | +26 | 65 | Qualification for the Premiership play-off semi-final |
| 3 | Inverness Caledonian Thistle | 36 | 16 | 11 | 9 | 53 | 34 | +19 | 59 | Qualification for the Premiership play-off quarter-final |
| 4 | Partick Thistle | 36 | 14 | 10 | 12 | 46 | 40 | +6 | 52 | Qualification for the Premiership play-off quarter-final |
| 5 | Raith Rovers | 36 | 12 | 14 | 10 | 44 | 44 | 0 | 50 | |
| 6 | Hamilton Academical | 36 | 10 | 12 | 14 | 38 | 53 | −15 | 42 | |
| 7 | Greenock Morton | 36 | 9 | 13 | 14 | 36 | 47 | −11 | 40 | |
| 8 | Ayr United | 36 | 9 | 12 | 15 | 39 | 52 | −13 | 39 | |
| 9 | Dunfermline Athletic (R) | 36 | 7 | 14 | 15 | 36 | 53 | −17 | 35 | Qualification for the Championship play-offs |
| 10 | Queen of the South (R) | 36 | 8 | 9 | 19 | 36 | 54 | −18 | 33 | Relegation to League One |

Rules for classification: 1) Points; 2) Goal difference; 3) Goals scored; 4) Head-to-to head points; 5) Head-to-head goal difference; 6) Play-off (only for deciding promotion, play-off participation and relegation).
(C) Champions; (P) Promoted; (R) Relegated

=== Positions by round ===
The table lists the positions of teams after each week of matches. To preserve chronological evolvements, any postponed matches are not included in the round at which they were originally scheduled, but added to the full round they were played immediately afterwards. For example, if a match is scheduled for round 13, but then postponed and played between rounds 16 and 17, it is added to the standings for round 16.

| Team ╲ Round | 1 | 2 | 3 | 4 | 5 | 6 | 7 | 8 | 9 | 10 | 11 | 12 | 13 | 14 | 15 | 16 | 17 | 18 | 19 | 20 | 21 | 22 | 23 | 24 | 25 | 26 | 27 | 28 | 29 | 30 | 31 | 32 | 33 | 34 | 35 | 36 |
|---|---|---|---|---|---|---|---|---|---|---|---|---|---|---|---|---|---|---|---|---|---|---|---|---|---|---|---|---|---|---|---|---|---|---|---|---|
| Kilmarnock | 1 | 2 | 1 | 3 | 2 | 2 | 2 | 2 | 3 | 2 | 1 | 1 | 1 | 1 | 1 | 3 | 4 | 5 | 4 | 3 | 4 | 3 | 3 | 2 | 2 | 2 | 2 | 2 | 1 | 1 | 1 | 1 | 1 | 1 | 1 | 1 |
| Arbroath | 9 | 7 | 4 | 4 | 3 | 3 | 3 | 3 | 5 | 5 | 3 | 3 | 3 | 5 | 5 | 5 | 3 | 1 | 1 | 1 | 1 | 1 | 1 | 1 | 1 | 1 | 1 | 1 | 2 | 2 | 2 | 2 | 2 | 2 | 2 | 2 |
| Inverness Caledonian Thistle | 3 | 3 | 2 | 1 | 1 | 1 | 1 | 1 | 1 | 1 | 2 | 2 | 2 | 3 | 3 | 1 | 1 | 2 | 2 | 2 | 2 | 2 | 2 | 3 | 3 | 3 | 3 | 4 | 4 | 3 | 3 | 3 | 3 | 3 | 3 | 3 |
| Partick Thistle | 2 | 1 | 3 | 2 | 4 | 4 | 5 | 5 | 4 | 4 | 5 | 5 | 5 | 4 | 4 | 4 | 5 | 4 | 5 | 5 | 5 | 5 | 5 | 5 | 5 | 5 | 4 | 3 | 3 | 4 | 4 | 4 | 4 | 4 | 4 | 4 |
| Raith Rovers | 5 | 6 | 7 | 5 | 6 | 5 | 4 | 4 | 2 | 3 | 4 | 4 | 4 | 2 | 2 | 2 | 2 | 3 | 3 | 4 | 3 | 4 | 4 | 4 | 4 | 4 | 5 | 5 | 5 | 5 | 5 | 5 | 5 | 5 | 5 | 5 |
| Hamilton Academical | 4 | 5 | 8 | 6 | 9 | 9 | 9 | 8 | 8 | 8 | 7 | 7 | 7 | 7 | 8 | 6 | 6 | 6 | 6 | 6 | 6 | 6 | 6 | 6 | 7 | 7 | 7 | 8 | 8 | 7 | 6 | 6 | 7 | 6 | 6 | 6 |
| Greenock Morton | 7 | 4 | 5 | 7 | 8 | 8 | 8 | 9 | 9 | 9 | 9 | 9 | 8 | 8 | 9 | 8 | 10 | 10 | 10 | 10 | 10 | 8 | 8 | 9 | 6 | 6 | 6 | 7 | 6 | 6 | 7 | 7 | 6 | 7 | 7 | 7 |
| Ayr United | 10 | 8 | 9 | 9 | 7 | 6 | 6 | 7 | 6 | 6 | 6 | 6 | 6 | 6 | 7 | 7 | 7 | 8 | 7 | 7 | 7 | 7 | 7 | 8 | 8 | 8 | 8 | 6 | 7 | 8 | 8 | 8 | 8 | 9 | 8 | 8 |
| Dunfermline Athletic | 6 | 9 | 10 | 10 | 10 | 10 | 10 | 10 | 10 | 10 | 10 | 10 | 10 | 10 | 6 | 9 | 8 | 9 | 9 | 9 | 9 | 10 | 9 | 7 | 9 | 9 | 9 | 10 | 10 | 9 | 9 | 9 | 9 | 8 | 9 | 9 |
| Queen of the South | 8 | 10 | 6 | 8 | 5 | 7 | 7 | 6 | 7 | 7 | 8 | 8 | 9 | 9 | 10 | 10 | 9 | 7 | 8 | 8 | 8 | 9 | 10 | 10 | 10 | 10 | 10 | 9 | 9 | 10 | 10 | 10 | 10 | 10 | 10 | 10 |

| Leader and promotion to the Premiership |
| Qualification for the Premiership play-off semi-final |
| Qualification for the Premiership play-off quarter-final |
| Qualification for the Premiership play-off quarter-final |
| Qualification for the Championship play-offs |
| Relegation to League One |

== Results ==
| Home \ Away | ARB | AYR | DNF | GMO | HAM | ICT | KIL | PAR | QOS | RAI | ARB | AYR | DNF | GMO | HAM | ICT | KIL | PAR | QOS | RAI |
|---|---|---|---|---|---|---|---|---|---|---|---|---|---|---|---|---|---|---|---|---|
| Arbroath | — | 1–1 | 4–2 | 2–1 | 4–0 | 0–1 | 0–0 | 3–1 | 1–1 | 0–0 | — | 1–0 | 1–0 | 3–0 | 2–2 | 0–0 | 1–0 | 1–1 | 5–1 | 3–3 |
| Ayr United | 2–2 | — | 3–1 | 0–0 | 1–1 | 2–2 | 0–1 | 0–4 | 2–1 | 0–2 | 1–0 | — | 1–1 | 0–2 | 1–1 | 2–2 | 1–3 | 3–1 | 0–1 | 2–0 |
| Dunfermline Athletic | 0–3 | 3–0 | — | 1–3 | 0–0 | 0–0 | 2–2 | 0–3 | 3–3 | 1–1 | 0–3 | 2–1 | — | 1–1 | 1–0 | 1–1 | 0–0 | 4–1 | 1–2 | 2–0 |
| Greenock Morton | 2–2 | 2–2 | 2–2 | — | 1–1 | 1–6 | 0–2 | 0–0 | 2–3 | 0–1 | 0–0 | 1–1 | 5–0 | — | 0–1 | 0–1 | 1–1 | 2–1 | 2–1 | 2–2 |
| Hamilton Academical | 1–1 | 0–2 | 1–0 | 0–1 | — | 2–1 | 0–2 | 1–6 | 1–0 | 0–3 | 0–1 | 1–1 | 2–2 | 1–0 | — | 1–1 | 2–3 | 2–2 | 1–0 | 0–2 |
| Inverness Caledonian Thistle | 0–1 | 1–0 | 1–2 | 2–0 | 1–2 | — | 1–0 | 3–1 | 2–1 | 1–0 | 3–0 | 1–2 | 2–0 | 0–1 | 4–0 | — | 2–1 | 3–3 | 2–2 | 1–1 |
| Kilmarnock | 0–1 | 2–0 | 2–1 | 1–0 | 2–1 | 0–1 | — | 0–1 | 4–0 | 1–3 | 2–1 | 1–2 | 2–0 | 1–1 | 2–0 | 1–0 | — | 2–1 | 2–1 | 3–0 |
| Partick Thistle | 0–2 | 4–0 | 0–0 | 3–0 | 1–0 | 0–0 | 0–2 | — | 3–2 | 1–0 | 0–0 | 1–0 | 1–0 | 0–1 | 0–4 | 1–0 | 1–1 | — | 1–0 | 0–1 |
| Queen of the South | 0–2 | 3–0 | 1–0 | 0–0 | 1–2 | 1–2 | 0–1 | 0–0 | — | 1–1 | 0–0 | 1–1 | 0–2 | 3–0 | 0–3 | 2–1 | 0–2 | 0–1 | — | 0–1 |
| Raith Rovers | 2–1 | 2–1 | 1–1 | 2–1 | 4–4 | 1–1 | 1–0 | 3–2 | 0–1 | — | 1–2 | 0–4 | 0–0 | 0–1 | 0–0 | 2–3 | 1–1 | 0–0 | 3–3 | — |

Legend: Blue = home team win; Yellow = draw; Red = away team win.

== Season statistics ==
=== Scoring ===
==== Top scorers ====
| Rank | Player | Club | Goals |
|---|---|---|---|
| 1 | (Scotland) Michael McKenna | Arbroath | 15 |
| 2 | (Scotland) Oli Shaw | Kilmarnock | 14 |
| 3 | (Scotland) Brian Graham | Partick Thistle | 13 |
| 4 | (England) Tomi Adeloye | Ayr United | 11 |
| 5 | (Scotland) Shane Sutherland | Inverness CT | 10 |

== Awards ==
| Month | Manager of the Month | | Player of the Month | |
| Month | Manager | Club | Player | Club |
|---|---|---|---|---|
| August | (Scotland) Billy Dodds | Inverness CT | (Scotland) Michael McKenna | Arbroath |
| September | (Scotland) Dick Campbell | Arbroath | (England) Joel Nouble | Arbroath |
| October | (Scotland) John McGlynn | Raith Rovers | (Scotland) Oli Shaw | Kilmarnock |
| November | (Scotland) Ian McCall | Partick Thistle | (Scotland) Ethan Ross | Raith Rovers |
| December | (Scotland) Dick Campbell | Arbroath | (Scotland) Anton Dowds | Arbroath |
| January | (Scotland) Dougie Imrie | Greenock Morton | (Scotland) Gavin Reilly | Greenock Morton |
| February | (Scotland) Dougie Imrie | Greenock Morton | (Northern Ireland) Kyle Lafferty | Kilmarnock |
| March | (Scotland) Derek McInnes | Kilmarnock | (Northern Ireland) Kyle Lafferty | Kilmarnock |
| April | (Scotland) Derek McInnes | Kilmarnock | (Scotland) Logan Chalmers | Inverness CT |

== Championship play-offs ==
The semi-finals will be contested by the teams placed second to fourth in Scottish League One, as well as the team placed ninth in the Scottish Championship. The winners will advance to the final, with the highest-ranked team hosting the second leg.

=== Bracket ===
Semifinals
1 | Dunfermline Athletic | 0 | 0 | 0
4 | Queen's Park | 0 | 1 | 1
3 | Airdrieonians (a.e.t.) | 0 | 6 | 6
2 | Montrose | 1 | 4 | 5

Final
Airdrieonians | 1 | 1 | 2
Queen's Park (a.e.t.) | 1 | 2 | 3

=== Semi-finals ===
==== First leg ====
| 4 May 2022 | Queen's Park | 0–0 | Dunfermline Athletic | Glasgow |
| 19:45 | | | | Stadium: Firhill Stadium; Attendance: 1,403; Referee: Colin Steven |

| 3 May 2022 | Montrose | 1–0 | Airdrieonians | Montrose |
| 19:45 | Johnston 8' | | | Stadium: Links Park; Attendance: 1,362; Referee: Graham Grainger |

==== Second leg ====
| 7 May 2022 | Dunfermline Athletic | 0–1 (0–1 agg.) | Queen's Park | Dunfermline |
| 15:00 | | | Murray 89' | Stadium: East End Park; Attendance: 3,179; Referee: Craig Napier |

| 7 May 2022 | Airdrieonians | 6–4 (a.e.t.) (6–5 agg.) | Montrose | Airdrie |
| 15:00 | Smith 53', 70', 75'; Gallagher 86'; Afolabi 105'; G.McGill 119' | | Ballantyne 12', 26'; Milne 69'; Rennie 120' | Stadium: Excelsior Stadium; Attendance: 2,080; Referee: Alan Newlands |

=== Final ===
==== First leg ====
| 12 May 2022 | Queen's Park | 1–1 | Airdrieonians | Glasgow |
| 19:30 | Murray 64' | | McCabe 87' (pen.) | Stadium: Firhill Stadium; Attendance: 1,899; Referee: Gavin Duncan |

==== Second leg ====
| 15 May 2022 | Airdrieonians | 1–2 (a.e.t.) (2–3 agg.) | Queen's Park | Airdrie |
| 13:10 | McCabe 13' | | Smith 17'; Murray 112' (pen.) | Stadium: Excelsior Stadium; Attendance: 3,026; Referee: Steven McLean |
