= 1876–77 Scottish Cup =

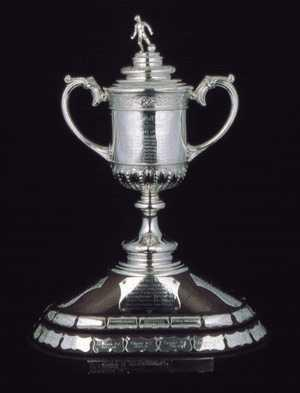
- The Scottish Cup trophy

Tournament details
- Country: Scotland
- Teams: 81

Final positions
- Champions: Vale of Leven (first title)
- Runners-up: Rangers

Tournament statistics
- Matches played: 88
- Goals scored: 280 (3.18 per match)

The 1876–77 Scottish Cup – officially the Scottish Football Association Challenge Cup – was the fourth season of Scotland's most prestigious football knockout competition. Entries to the competition again increased with a total of 81 clubs involved in the first round draw. This resulted in an earlier start to the competition than in previous seasons with the first matches played on 23 September 1876. The cup was won for the first time by Dunbartonshire club Vale of Leven who defeated Rangers 3–2 in a twice-replayed final.

This was the first final which did not involve defending champions Queen's Park who lost 2–1 to Vale of Leven in the quarter-finals and the first time the cup was won by a team from outside Glasgow.

== Calendar ==
1876–77 Scottish Cup calendar
Round	First match date	Fixtures			Clubs
Round	First match date	Original	Byes	Replays	Clubs
First round	23 September 1876	40	1	3	81 → 41
Second round	21 October 1876	20	1	1	41 → 21
Third round	11 November 1876	10	1	1	21 → 12
Fourth round	23 November 1876	6	0	0	12 → 6
Quarter-finals	23 December 1876	3	0	0	6 → 3
Semi-finals	10 March 1877	1	1	0	3 → 2
Final	17 March 1877	1	0	2	2 → 1

- 2 teams qualified for the second round after drawing their first round replays
- 23rd Renfrew RV resigned after winning their first round match
- 2 teams qualified for the fourth round after drawing their third round replays

== Teams ==
All 81 teams entered the competition in the first round.

Competing teams arranged by district
Ayrshire	Dunbartonshire	Edinburgh	Glasgow and District			Lanarkshire	Renfrewshire
Ardrossan; Ayr Eglinton; Ayr Thistle; Beith; Cumnock; Dean; Girvan; Kilbirnie; Kilmarnock; Kilmarnock Portland; Mauchline; Maybole Carrick; Queen of the South Wanderers; St Andrew's (Kilmarnock); Winton	Alclutha; Dumbarton; Helensburgh; Lennox; Renton; Renton Thistle; Star of Leven; Vale of Leven; Vale of Leven Rovers; 10th Dumbarton RV	Dunfermline; Edinburgh Thistle; Grasshoppers; Hanover; Heart of Midlothian; Lenzie; St Andrew's (Edinburgh); St Clement's; Swifts; 3rd Edinburgh RV	Alexandra Athletic; Blythswood; Caledonian; Clydesdale; Craig Park; Crosshill; Dennistoun; Dumbreck; Eastern; Govan; Havelock	Hyde Park Locomotive Works; Lancefield; Northern; Parkgrove; Partick; Possilpark; Queen's Park; Queen's Park Juniors; Ramblers; Rangers; Rovers	Sandyford; South Western; Standard; Telegraphists; Towerhill; West End; Western; 1st Lanark RV; 3rd Lanark RV; 4th Renfrew RV	Airdrie; Arthurlie; Barrhead; Drumpellier; Hamilton; Hamilton Academical; Thornhill; Levern; Shotts; Stonelaw	Busby; Renfrew; Thornliebank; 23rd Renfrew RV

== First round ==
=== Glasgow and District ===
Glasgow and District first round results
Date	Home team	Score	Away team	Venue
23 September 1876	Partick	3–1	Havelock	Inchview, Partick
30 September 1876	Towerhill	2–1	Rovers	Mosefield Park, Glasgow
30 September 1876	Hyde Park Locomotive Works	1–2	Crosshill	Vale Park, Glasgow
30 September 1876	Parkgrove	0–2	Lancefield	Clifford Park, Govan
30 September 1876	Northern	12–0	Telegraphists	Hyde Park, Glasgow
30 September 1876	West End	2–0	4th Renfrew RV	Avenne Park, Glasgow
30 September 1876	Caledonian	2–1	Standard	Kelvinbridge Cricket Ground, Glasgow
30 September 1876	3rd Lanark RV	6–0	Ramblers	Cathkin Park, Crosshill
30 September 1876	Dumbreck	3–1	Dennistoun	Ibroxhill, Govan
30 September 1876	Queen's Park	7–0	Sandyford	Hampden Park, Crosshill
30 September 1876	Rangers	4–1	Queen's Park Juniors	Kinning Park, Kinning Park
30 September 1876	1st Lanark RV	0–1	South Western	Burnbank Park, Glasgow
30 September 1876	Alexandra Athletic	1–1	Eastern	Kennyhill Park, Glasgow
30 September 1876	Possilpark	1–2	Blythswood	Saracen Park, Possilpark
7 October 1876	Clydesdale	6–0	Craig Park	Titwood, Pollokshields
	Govan	w/o (Note: Western scratched and Govan advanced to the second round.)	Western	

Glasgow and District first round replay
Date	Home team	Score	Away team	Venue
7 October 1876	Eastern	2–0 (void) (Note: A protest by Alexandra Athletic was upheld and a replay was ordered.)	Alexandra Athletic	Barrowfield Park, Glasgow

Glasgow and District first round second replay
Date	Home team	Score	Away team	Venue
15 October 1876	Alexandra Athletic	1–0	Eastern	Kennyhill Park, Glasgow

=== Renfrewshire district ===
Renfrewshire district first round results
Date	Home team	Score	Away team	Venue
30 September 1876	Busby	2–0	Renfrew	Field Park, Busby
30 September 1876	23rd Renfrew RV	1–1	Thornliebank	Muirend Park, Cathcart

Renfrewshire district first round replay
Date	Home team	Score	Away team	Venue
7 October 1876	Thornliebank	0–2	23rd Renfrew RV	Cowglen, Thornliebank

=== Dunbartonshire district ===
Dunbartonshire district first round results
Date	Home team	Score	Away team	Venue
30 September 1876	Renton Thistle	0–0	Vale of Leven Rovers (Alexandria)	Southend Park, Renton
30 September 1876	Vale of Leven	1–0	Helensburgh	North Street Park, Alexandria
30 September 1876	Dumbarton	1–1	Renton	Townend, Dumbarton
30 September 1876	Star of Leven	4–0	10th Dumbarton RV	Bridge Street, Alexandria
7 October 1876	Lennox	3–0	Alclutha	Levengrove Park, Dumbarton

Dunbartonshire district first round replays
Date	Home team	Score	Away team	Venue
7 October 1876	Vale of Leven Rovers (Alexandria)	1–1 (Note: Both teams advanced to the second round.)	Renton Thistle	Public Park, Alexandria
7 October 1876	Renton	0–2	Dumbarton	Public Park, Renton

=== Edinburgh district ===
Edinburgh district first round results
Date	Home team	Score	Away team	Venue
30 September 1876	Edinburgh Thistle	5–0	Hanover	East Meadows, Edinburgh
30 September 1876	St Andrew's (Edinburgh)	1–0	Grasshoppers	East Meadows, Edinburgh
30 September 1876	Lenzie	1–2	Swifts	Lenzie Football Field, Lenzie
30 September 1876	St Clement's	1–0	3rd Edinburgh	Neutral venue, Kirkcaldy (Note: Played at an unknown neutral venue in Kirkcaldy.)
	Dunfermline	w/o (Note: Heart of Midlothian scratched and Dunfermline advanced to the second round.)	Heart of Midlothian	

=== Ayrshire district ===
Kilmarnock received a bye to the second round.

Ayrshire district first round results
Date	Home team	Score	Away team	Venue
23 September 1876	Kilbirnie	5–0	Maybole Carrick	Stonyholm Park, Kilbirnie
30 September 1876	St Andrew's (Kilmarnock)	1–1	Ayr Eglinton	Grange Park, Kilmarnock
30 September 1876	Ayr Thistle	1–0	Beith	Robbsland Park, Ayr
30 September 1876	Mauchline	5–0	Winton	Connel Park, Mauchline
30 September 1876	Girvan	3–2	Dean	Eglinton Park, Ayr (Note: Match played at a neutral venue.)
30 September 1876	Cumnock	1–2	Kilmarnock Portland	Greenmill Holm, Cumnock
	Queen of the South Wanderers	w/o (Note: Ardrossan scratched and Queen of the South Wanderers advanced to the second round.)	Ardrossan	

Ayrshire district first round replay
Date	Home team	Score	Away team	Venue
7 October 1876	Ayr Eglinton	0–1 (Note: Played as 2 halves of 30 minutes.)	St Andrew's (Kilmarnock)	Robbsland Park, Ayr (Note: Match played at a neutral venue.)

=== Lanarkshire district ===
Lanarkshire district first round results
Date	Home team	Score	Away team	Venue
30 September 1876	Arthurlie	3–0	Drumpellier	Arthurlie Cross, Barrhead
30 September 1876	Levern	0–1	Airdrie	Wellington Park, Hurlet
30 September 1876	Hamilton	2–0	Thornhill	South Avenue, Hamilton
30 September 1876	Stonelaw	3–0	Shotts	Burnside Park, Rutherglen
7 October 1876	Hamilton Academical	0–4	Barrhead	Bent Farm, Hamilton

== Second round ==
=== Glasgow and District ===
Glasgow and District second round results
Date	Home team	Score	Away team	Venue
21 October 1876	Towerhill	0–8	Rangers	Mosefield Park, Glasgow
21 October 1876	West End	2–2	Govan	Avenne Park, Glasgow
21 October 1876	3rd Lanark RV	0–0	Clydesdale	Cathkin Park, Crosshill
21 October 1876	Partick	5–1	Blythswood	Inchview, Partick
21 October 1876	Crosshill	0–0	Lancefield	Kilmaining Park, Cathcart
21 October 1876	Northern	4–0	Alexandra Athletic	Hyde Park, Glasgow
28 October 1876	South Western	0–2	Dumbreck	Copeland Park, Govan
28 October 1876	Caledonian	0–7	Queen's Park	Kelvinbridge Cricket Ground, Glasgow

Glasgow and District second round replays
Date	Home team	Score	Away team	Venue
28 October 1876	Govan	0–1	West End	Fairfield Park, Govan
28 October 1876	Clydesdale	0–4	3rd Lanark RV	Titwood, Pollokshields
28 October 1876	Lancefield	2–0	Crosshill	Brighton Park, Govan

=== Dunbartonshire district ===
Dunbartonshire district second round results
Date	Home team	Score	Away team	Venue
21 October 1876	Vale of Leven	7–0	Vale of Leven Rovers	North Street Park, Alexandria
21 October 1876	Star of Leven	0–4	Dumbarton	Bridge Street, Alexandria
28 October 1876	Lennox	5–1	Renton Thistle	Levengrove Park, Dumbarton

=== Edinburgh district ===
Edinburgh district second round results
Date	Home team	Score	Away team	Venue
21 October 1876	St Andrew's (Edinburgh)	1–2 (void) (Note: A protest by St Andrew's was upheld and a replay was ordered.)	St Clement's	Neutral venue, Kirkcaldy
21 October 1876	Swifts	1–0	Edinburgh Thistle	Roseburn Park, Edinburgh
21 October 1876	Dunfermline	1–2	Hamilton	Towngreen, Dunfermline

Edinburgh district second round replay
Date	Home team	Score	Away team	Venue
	St Clement's	w/o (Note: St Andrew's scratched and St Clement's advanced to the third round.)	St Andrew's (Edinburgh)	

=== Lanarkshire district ===
Lanarkshire district second round results
Date	Home team	Score	Away team	Venue
21 October 1876	Barrhead	4–0	Airdrie	Beacon's Field, Barrhead
21 October 1876	Stonelaw	0–4	Arthurlie	Burnside Park, Rutherglen

=== Renfrewshire district ===
Renfrewshire district second round results
Date	Home team	Score	Away team	Venue
21 October 1876	Busby	1–0	23rd Renfrew RV	Field Park, Busby

=== Ayrshire district ===
Ayrshire district second round results
Date	Home team	Score	Away team	Venue
21 October 1876	Kilmarnock	1–2	Mauchline	Holm Quarry, Kilmarnock
21 October 1876	Kilmarnock Portland	2–0	St Andrew's (Kilmarnock)	Nursery Park, Kilmarnock
21 October 1876	Kilbirnie	0–1	Ayr Thistle	Stonyholm Park, Kilbirnie
28 October 1876	Girvan	4–0	Queen of the South Wanderers	Race Park, Newton Stewart (Note: Match played at a neutral venue.)

== Third round ==
Rangers received a bye to the fourth round.

Third round results
Date	Home team	Score	Away team	Venue
11 November 1876	Mauchline	7–0	Kilmarnock Portland	Connel Park, Mauchline
11 November 1876	Hamilton	0–0	Busby	South Avenue, Hamilton
11 November 1876	Girvan	0–3	Lancefield	Neutral venue, Ayr (Note: Played at an unknown neutral venue in Ayr.)
11 November 1876	St Clement's	1–2	Northern	Magdalen Green, Dundee
18 November 1876	Vale of Leven	1–0	3rd Lanark RV	North Street Park, Alexandria
18 November 1876	Queen's Park	7–0	Arthurlie	Hampden Park, Crosshill
18 November 1876	Lennox	1–0	Dumbarton	Levengrove Park, Dumbarton
18 November 1876	Swifts	1–1 (Note: West End were disqualified and Swifts advanced to the fourth round.)	West End	Roseburn Park, Edinburgh
18 November 1876	Partick	2–0	Barrhead	Inchview, Partick

Third round replay
Date	Home team	Score	Away team	Venue
18 November 1876	Busby	0–0 (Note: Both teams advanced to the fourth round.)	Hamilton	Field Park, Busby

== Fourth round ==
Fourth round results
Date	Home team	Score	Away team	Venue
2 December 1876	Queen's Park	4–0	Northern	Hampden Park, Crosshill
2 December 1876	Vale of Leven	4–0	Busby	North Street Park, Alexandria
2 December 1876	Lancefield	2–0	Hamilton	Brighton Park, Govan
2 December 1876	Swifts	0–4	Lennox	Roseburn Park, Edinburgh
9 December 1876	Mauchline	0–3	Rangers	Connel Park, Mauchline
9 December 1876	Ayr Thistle	1–1 (Note: Partick were disqualified and Ayr Thistle advanced to the quarter-finals.)	Partick	Robbsland Park, Ayr

== Quarter-finals ==
Quarter-final results
Date	Home team	Score	Away team	Venue
23 December 1876	Lancefield	2–2	Ayr Thistle	Brighton Park, Govan
30 December 1876	Queen's Park	1–2	Vale of Leven	Hampden Park, Crosshill
30 December 1876	Lennox	0–3	Rangers	Levengrove Park, Dumbarton

Quarter-final replay
Date	Home team	Score	Away team	Venue
30 December 1876	Ayr Thistle	1–0	Lancefield	Robbsland Park, Ayr

== Semi-final ==
Rangers received a bye to the final.

Semi-final results
Date	Home team	Score	Away team	Venue
13 January 1877	Vale of Leven	9–0	Ayr Thistle	Kinning Park, Kinning Park

== Final ==
17 March 1877
15:00

Vale of Leven	1–1	Rangers
Paton 10'		McDougall 65' (o.g.)

Hamilton Crescent, Partick
Attendance: 8,000
Referee: James Kerr (Hamilton)

=== Replay ===
7 April 1877
15:00

Vale of Leven	1–1 (a.e.t.)	Rangers
McDougall 70'		Dunlop 20'

Hamilton Crescent, Partick
Attendance: 15,000
Referee: James Kerr (Hamilton)

=== Second replay ===
13 April 1877
15:00

Vale of Leven	3–2	Rangers
Watson 15' (o.g.); Baird 70'; Paton 88'		W. McNeil 47'; Campbell 50'

Hampden Park, Crosshill
Attendance: 12,000
Referee: James Kerr (Hamilton)

== See also ==
- 1876–77 in Scottish football
