= 10th Dumbartonshire Rifle Volunteers F.C. =

Association football club in Glasgow City, Scotland

10th D.R.V.
- Full name: 10th Dumbartonshire Rifle Volunteers Football Club
- Nickname: the Volunteers
- Founded: 1874
- Dissolved: 1882
- Ground: Holm Park
- President: Lt Sandeman
- Secretary: Andrew Matson
Home colours

The 10th Dumbartonshire Rifle Volunteers Football Club, known as Kirkintilloch Athletic Football Club from 1879 until the club was wound up in 1882, was a 19th-century association football club based in Kirkintilloch in Dunbartonshire.

== History ==
The club was formed out of the 10th Dumbartonshire Rifle Volunteers, a company in the Volunteer movement of the British Army. The Volunteers included sporting activities within their purview and newspapers often carried reports of such activities. The growth of football in Scotland, especially thanks to Queen's Park F.C., and the success of army teams in England such as the Royal Engineers A.F.C., encouraged regiments to form football clubs as part of the physical regimen.

=== 10th D.R.V. ===
The 10th D.R.V. was formed in 1874, in the vanguard of other Volunteer regimental sides. Its first recorded match against another side was the first round of the 1876–77 Scottish Cup, losing 4–0 at Star of Leven.

In 1877–78, the club was again drawn against the Star, but this time gained a walkover victory, when the Star walked off the pitch in protest at a second goal being given to the 10th. In the second round, the club lost 3–0 at Renton.

The difficulties the Volunteers had as a competitive outfit were its narrow recruitment base (although the club secretary and treasurer, Andrew Matson, worked at the National Bank of Scotland) and the strength of the three leading clubs in Dunbartonshire, who all made the Scottish Cup final repeatedly over the 1870s and 1880s. In the 1878–79 Scottish Cup, the club was drawn at Dumbarton F.C., and lost 8–1, the defeat being put down to a lack of teamwork.

=== Kirkintilloch Athletic ===
In 1879 therefore club sought to widen its appeal beyond the Volunteer movement, and changed its name to Kirkintilloch Athletic, although the link with the regiment remained strong, the 10th D.R.V. instrumental band providing the pre-match entertainment for a friendly with Falkirk which opened the 1879–80 season.

Under the new name, the club entered the 1879–80 Scottish Cup, and, after getting a bye in the first round, were seemingly knocked out in the second by Jamestown F.C., 1–0. However, after Jamestown beat Lennox F.C. in the third round, Lennox protested that four Jamestown players were not bona fide members of the Jamestown club. After the Scottish FA committee heard the evidence, the effect of the ruling was the expulsion of Jamestown from the competition ab initio, meaning that Jamestown's first-round victim - the Star of Leven - was put back into the second round, to play Kirkintilloch, in order for the right to meet Lennox in the third round. Kirkintilloch made the most of the reprieve, beating Star 5–2 in the second round, and Lennox in the third 6–2. The run ended in the fourth round with a 5–1 defeat at 3rd Lanarkshire Rifle Volunteers.

It was the club's best run in the competition. In 1880–81 the club was drawn, again, to face Star of Leven, and lost 3–2, having been 2–1 up with ten minutes remaining; and in the 1881–82 Scottish Cup the clubs were drawn together yet again, but by the time the competition kicked off, the Athletic was defunct. The name was revived in 1885 for another club.

== Colours ==
The club originally wore navy and red hoops. In 1879, with the name change, the club changed colours to white.

== Grounds ==
The club originally played at Holm Park, near Townhead in Kirkintilloch. From 1878 the club played at Bellfield Park.
