= St Clement's F.C. =

Former association football club in Scotland

St. Clement's
- Full name: St. Clement's Football Club
- Founded: 1875
- Dissolved: 1881
- Ground: Magdalen Green
- Secretary: D. R. Stewart, William Robertson
Home colours

St. Clement's Football Club was a football club from Dundee, Scotland. Founded in 1875, they were the first club in Dundee playing association rules, and the first from the city to enter the Scottish Cup.

== History ==
The club was founded in 1875, the first club in Dundee to be founded, and the first to enter the Scottish Cup, in 1876–77. The club quickly absorbed the Dunmore club, with a number of Dunmore players (including captain Gorthy) being listed as St Clement's players by the end of 1877.

The club had early ambitions, in its first season arranging home-and-home matches against Queen's Park (albeit a second XI), and not being disgraced with defeats by 3–0 and 3–1, the club's only goal coming from a scrimmage in the match at Hampden Park being "loudly cheered" by the generous home fans.

One problem the club had was that the early rounds of the Scottish Cup was drawn on a regional basis, and, with no neighbouring clubs entering, the club was placed in the draw with the Edinburgh clubs; the club's first two ties in 1876–77 were played off at neutral ground in Kirkcaldy. The club's first tie was a win over the Edinburgh Cup holders 3rd Edinburgh Rifle Volunteers, Stiven scoring the only goal after nine minutes. In the second round, the club came from behind to beat St. Andrew's, with goals from Sharp and captain M'Lennan (the latter from a Stiven left-wing cross); St. Andrew's protested that Sharp's goal should not have been allowed, but it was turned down.

The club's run ended in the third round with a 2–1 home defeat to Northern of Glasgow, St. Clement's handicapped by captain M'Lennan being forced to miss the game.

St. Clement's reached the fourth round in the 1877–78 Scottish Cup, but the club only won one match (against Dunmore, in the latter's only Scottish Cup tie), being the beneficiary of one walkover and one bye. In the fourth round, drawn away at Beith, the club scratched.

In the 1877–78 season it was still one of the top sides in the town, beating East End 4–0 and Strathmore 2–0, and it was the side invited to play an Arbroath scratch side on 16 March 1878, before an "immense concourse" of spectators, as the first association game played in the town; St. Clement's won 6–0.

However, the club seems barely to have played afterwards. A return match at home to Arbroath at the start of the 1878–79 season ended in a goalless draw, and, although St. Clement's was said to have been scheduled to play at Heart of Midlothian later that week, the fixture was taken by the Our Boys side instead, with the Our Boys side including at least three St. Clement's players (Dron, who captained the side, Westwater, and Gorthy). By the 1879–80 season, Westwater and Gorthy were turning out regularly for Our Boys instead and St. Clement's may no longer have existed other than as a notional member of the Scottish FA; the local media did not report on any matches which did take place. St. Clement's continued to enter the Scottish Cup but did not play any ties after the Dunmore victory. The last reference to the club is to its being drawn to visit Strathmore in the 1881–82 Scottish Cup.

== Colours ==
The club played in white shirts and knickerbockers.

== Grounds ==
The club's first ground was Baxter Park. From 1876 to 1878 the club played at Magdalen Green, and from the start of the 1878–79 season the club was back at Baxter Park.
