= Vale of Leven Rovers F.C. (Alexandria) =

Former association football club in Scotland

Vale of Leven Rovers
- Full name: Vale of Leven Rovers Football Club (Alexandria)
- Nickname: Rovers
- Founded: 1873
- Dissolved: 1877
- Ground: Public Park, Alexandria
- Secretary: D. M'Gregor of Bonhill
Home colours

Vale of Leven Rovers Football Club was a Scottish association football club based in the town of Alexandria, Dunbartonshire.

== History ==
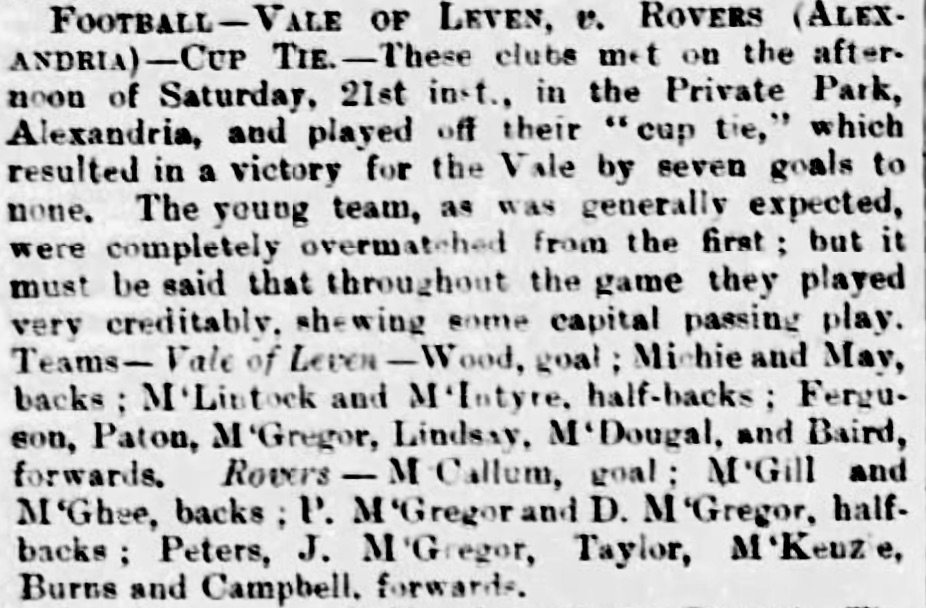
1876–77 Scottish Cup 1st Round, Vale of Leven 7–0 Vale of Leven Rovers, Dumbarton Herald, 26 October 1876

The club was founded in 1873. Owing to a club in Glasgow having an identical name, the media sometimes referred to the club as Rovers (Alexandria).

The club's first recorded matches took place in October 1875. and it first entered the Scottish Cup that season, the only one in which both the Alexandria and Glasgow Vale of Leven Rovers clubs both entered. However neither played a tie; the Glaswegian club scratching to Dumbreck, and the Alexandria club scratching to Vale of Leven, which was the strongest club in Dunbartonshire at the time.

The club's only matches in the competition came in 1876–77. The club drew twice against Renton Thistle in the first round, and, under the rules of the competition at the time, both clubs went through to the second round. Rovers then were drawn against Vale of Leven again; this time Rovers attended the tie, but lost 7–0, despite some "capital passing play".

The club's final Scottish Cup entry was in 1877–78, and was drawn to visit Renton, but scratched before the tie.

There are no records of the club after this withdrawal, probably due to the lack of a private ground (by now a requirement for Scottish Football Association members), and the name was revived in 1887 for the Vale of Leven second XI.

== Colours ==
The club's home colours were light blue shirts with white knickers and black hose.

== Ground ==
The club played on a public park in Alexandria, a two minute walk from Alexandria railway station.
