= Craig Park F.C. =

Association football club in Glasgow City, Scotland

Craig Park
- Full name: Craig Park Football Club
- Founded: 1874
- Dissolved: 1877
- Ground: Haghill Park
- Secretary: George H. Bruce
Home colours

Craig Park Football Club, usually recorded as Craigpark, was a Scottish association football club based in Dennistoun, in Glasgow.

== History ==
The club was founded in 1874, and was named after the Craig Park estate, one of those bought up by Alexander Dennistoun when building the suburb. The earliest record of the club is its failure to turn up at Bellahouston of Govan for a match in December 1874. The club was not one of Glasgow's leading clubs, only being considered of status to face the second XIs of Northern and Alexandra Athletic.

Nevertheless, Craig Park entered the Scottish Cup in 1876–77. Craig Park was drawn to play Clydesdale, who had played in the first final, at the latter's Titwood Park. The Clydesdale won 6–0, the Craig Park players being described as "showing good play, but want of combined effort prevented them from having a single shot at their opponents' goal".

Craig Park entered again the following season. The club opened the season by being the first visitor to Rosslyn's new ground at Brighton Park, drawing 1–1. In the Cup, the club was drawn at home to Havelock, but switched the tie to their opponent's Middleton Park, and lost 6–0 again.

The club was active throughout the 1877–78 season, even running a second XI, but the last recorded presence of the club is for a match at Kelvinbank in February 1878, the senior football role in the district being taken on by the Dennistoun club.

== Colours ==
The club's colours were orange and black jerseys and hose, with dark blue knickers.

== Ground ==
The club played at Haghill Park, a minute's walk from the tram terminus at Dennistoun. The Dennistoun club took the ground over from 1879.
