= Kilmarnock Portland F.C. =

Association football club in Kilmarnock, Scotland

Kilmarnock Portland
- Full name: Kilmarnock Portland Football Club
- Nickname: the Whites
- Founded: 1873
- Dissolved: 1883
- Ground: Hamilton Park
- President: J. Littlejohn
1873–78 colours	1878–83 colours

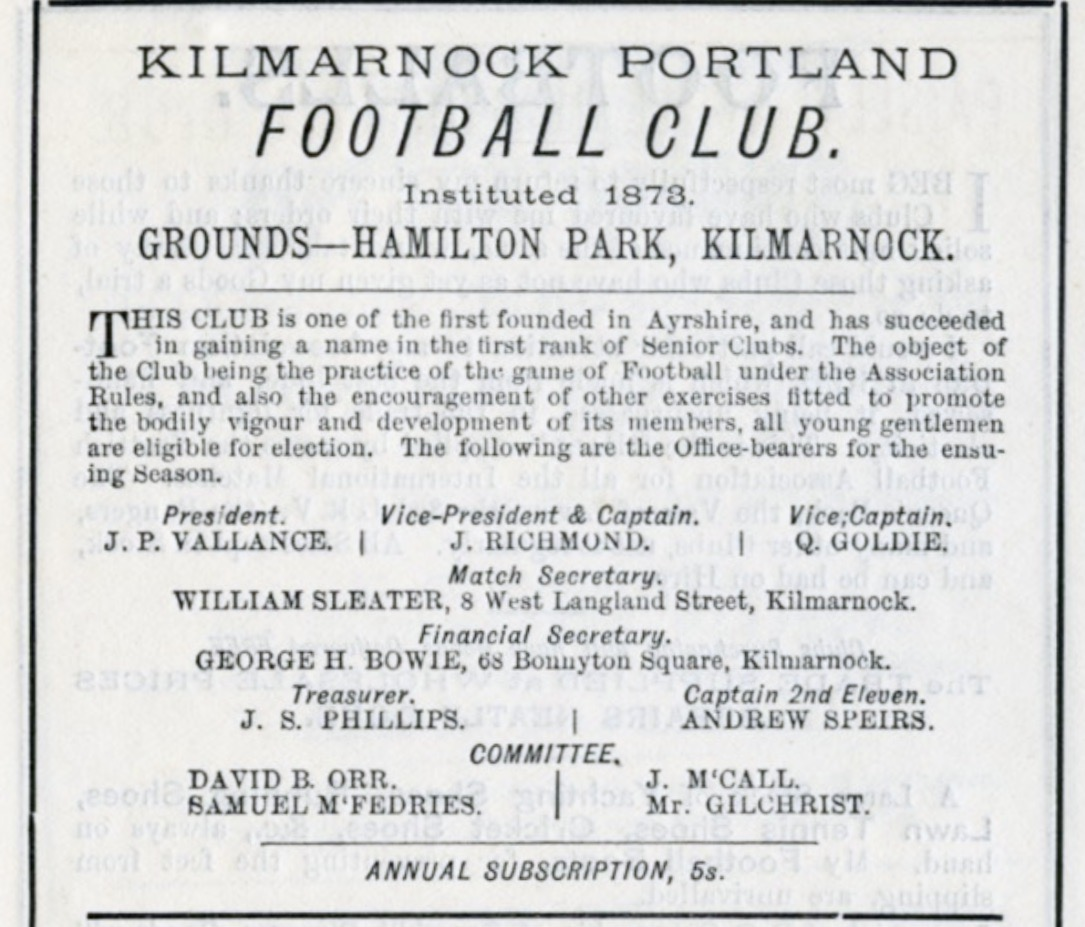
Advert for Kilmarnock Portland Football Club in the SFA Yearbook 1881

Kilmarnock Portland Football Club was an association football club from Ayrshire in Scotland.

== History ==
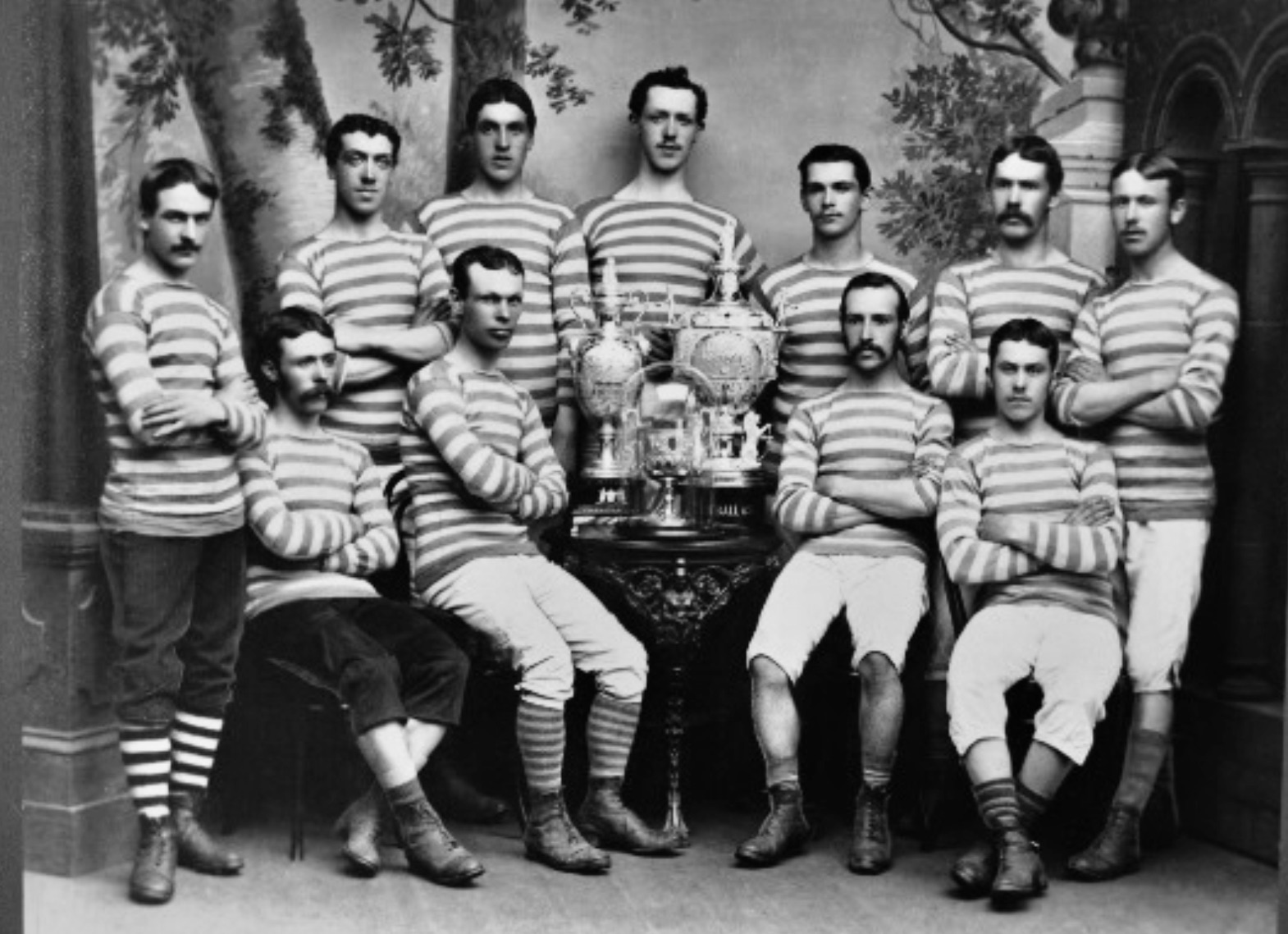
The 1877–78 side.

The club was founded in 1873, out of a cricket club, and quickly became the leading club in Kilmarnock. The club's name - often given simply as Portland - was taken from Portland Street in the town centre. The club was considered the favourite of the "rustics" from around the town.

The first time the club undertook competitive play was in the Scottish Cup in 1876–77. The club won its first tie 2–1 at Cumnock In the second it beat fellow Kilmarnock side St Andrew's 2–0, in a "one-sided game". The third round consisted of 21 clubs, and was still drawn on a regional basis; Portland lost 7–0 at the strong Mauchline side, to the surprise of those attending who were expecting a close game - at the time, with 130 members, Portland was the biggest club outside Glasgow, except for Vale of Leven, and had 60 more members than Mauchline. Portland conceded within 90 seconds of the start and the second goal came from a Portland attack, when Harrison "selfishly" failed to pass the ball, and Mauchline broke back.

Portland was runner-up to Mauchline in the first Ayrshire Cup in 1877–78, losing 4–2 in the final, played at Holm Quarry, the home ground for a number of other Kilmarnock sides. The match proved to be a test between the Portland's wider wing play and Mauchline's more compact forward line; Portland's opening goal was a Goldie header from a Sinclair corner, and the club went 2–1 up after Mauchline's back Wilson impeded his goalkeeper, but two goals in the last 20 minutes won the trophy for Mauchline.

The club reached the final again in 1878–79, beating Ayr Academicals in the club's penultimate tie by defending a one-goal lead through time-wasting tactics, continually sending the ball "into 'touch'". The club had also survived an apparent elimination by Beith, in a tie which included 500 spectators from Kilmarnock travelling by a special train; the only goal of the game came from a free-kick after an appeal for hands, which the referee had not actually given, but for which the Beith umpire had flagged. Despite Portland protesting the goal, which under the rules at the time would be considered later, Beith refused to play extra-time. The Ayrshire Football Association ordered a replay at Hamilton Park, which Portland won following "a fine piece of cross-play" between Harrison, Gallocher, and Goldie. Again however the club was runner-up in the final, losing to Kilmarnock Athletic in a replay, in extra-time; in that period Portland's captain Vallance sent the ball into the goalmouth from a free-kick, and the ball went through the goal without touching anyone. At the time, all free-kicks were indirect, so no goal was given. Worse for Vallance was that it was his slip near the end that presented Johnston with the winning goal.

Portland had some consolation in 1878–79 by winning the Burns Cup, an invitational tournament to raise funds for a statue to Robert Burns, coming from behind to beat Mauchline 2–1 in the final - the first time the Portland had beaten the Mauchline. The club placed the cup in the Burns Museum in order to raise more funds for the monument.

The season also saw the club gain its longest run in the Scottish Cup, reaching the fourth round, made up of 18 clubs; the first round saw Portland gain its biggest Cup win with a 9–0 score against Dean. In the fourth round, the club was drawn at home to the quasi-professional Dumbarton side, and earned a 1–1 draw (Vallance this time placing a free-kick "beautifully" for Campbell to equalize), but in the replay was 5–0 down at half-time, albeit some honour was gained with a (disputed) goal in the second-half.

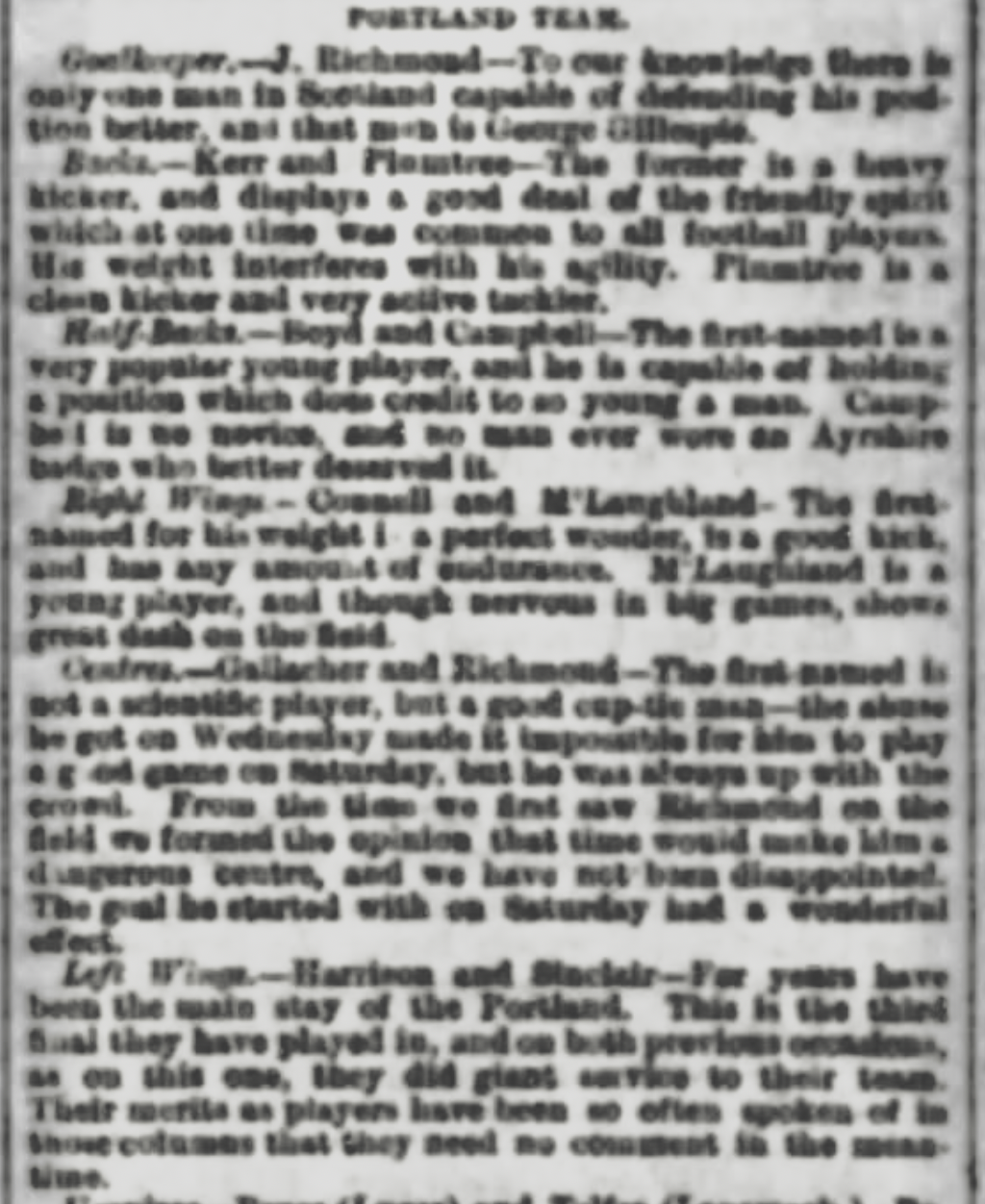
The players who won the 1881–82 Ayrshire Cup for Kilmarnock Portland, Kilmarnock Standard, 1 April 1882

Portland finally won the Ayrshire Cup in 1881–82, beating Kilmarnock 4–0 in the final thanks to goals from Richmond (2), Connell, and Harrison, and completed a double with a win in the invitational Merchants' Charity Cup final, over Lugar Boswell. The club's defence of both trophies ended with defeats to Kilmarnock Athletic, which had reached the Scottish Cup semi-final for the previous two years, and which would go on to match Portland's double.

With Kilmarnock Athletic losing players to English clubs, Portland looked as if it could take over the mantle as the leading side in Kilmarnock; in 1880, it was considered one of the two leading sides in the town (with Athletic), and Kilmarnock F.C. was considered "second-rank". However, in July 1883, despite having already entered the Scottish and Ayrshire Cups for 1883–84, the club disbanded, "in consequence of losing its ground". One problem was that the Athletic had been getting bigger crowds during the season. Portland's assets were put up for sale in September 1883.

== Colours ==
The club's colours were originally navy and white one-inch hoops. From 1877 onwards they were white jerseys with a badge, white knickers, and blue stockings.

== Ground ==
The club originally played on Mr Blair's field at Holehouse Road. In 1875, the club moved to Nursery Park, off West Netherton Street. In 1877 the club moved to its most famous ground, Hamilton Park, next door to Rugby Park.

== Honours ==
- Ayrshire Cup
  - Winners: 1881–82
  - Runners-up: 1877–78, 1878–79
- Burns Cup
  - Winners: 1878–79
- Kilmarnock Merchants Charity Cup
  - Winners: 1881–82
