= Ayr Academy F.C. =

Ayr Academy
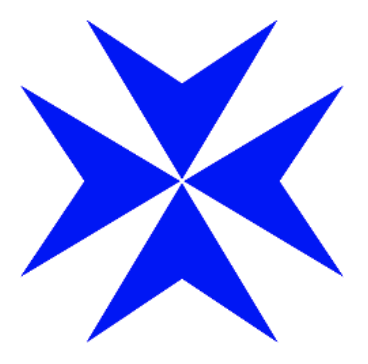
- Full name: Ayr Academy Football Club
- Founded: 1869
- Dissolved: 1876
- Ground: Low Green
- Secretary: D. Kirkland
Home colours

Ayr Academy Football Club was an association football club from Ayr, Scotland. The club was one of the ancestral clubs to the current Scottish League club Ayr United.

== History ==
The club claimed a foundation date of 1869, which would have made it the earliest football club in Ayr, although there are no recorded matches for the club until the 1873–74 season. The club played both association football and rugby football; as an example of the fluidity in codes, in October 1873 the club lost to Kilmarnock in a game played to rugby rules. By 1874 the club had 73 members.

=== Proximity to Ayr Eglinton ===
The academy did not enter the Scottish Cup, but there were close links with the Ayr Eglinton club, which was formed in 1875. From the Ayr Academy cricket side, the King brothers played for Eglinton in the 1875–76 Scottish Cup, and of the XI which played against the Ayr Volunteers in the 1875–76 season, two players (Sliman and Reid) played for Eglinton in the 1875–76 Cup, and another five (goalkeeper Gemmell, three members of the Highet family, and Craig) played for Eglinton in the 1876–77 Scottish Cup. Academy even played Eglinton in October 1875, winning 2–0.

=== Merger ===
The final Academy match was scheduled to take place on 14 October 1876, at Girvan. It is not clear whether this match took place. In a meeting at the Ayr Assembly Rooms that weekend, it was "unanimously agreed" to merge the academy and Eglinton clubs, to form a new club, Ayr Academicals.

== Colours ==
Its colours were red cap, jersey, and stockings, with white knickerbockers, and a blue Maltese cross on the left breast.

== Ground ==
The club played at the Low Green, using the Ayr Arms on the High Street for its facilities.

== Notable players ==
- William Beveridge earned one cap for Scotland when registered as an Ayr Academy player
