= Avondale F.C. =

Avondale
- Full name: Avondale Football Club
- Founded: 1875
- Dissolved: 1879
- Ground: Townhead
- Hon. secretary: James Grierson
Home colours

Avondale Football Club was a 19th-century football club based in Strathaven, Lanarkshire, Scotland.

== History ==
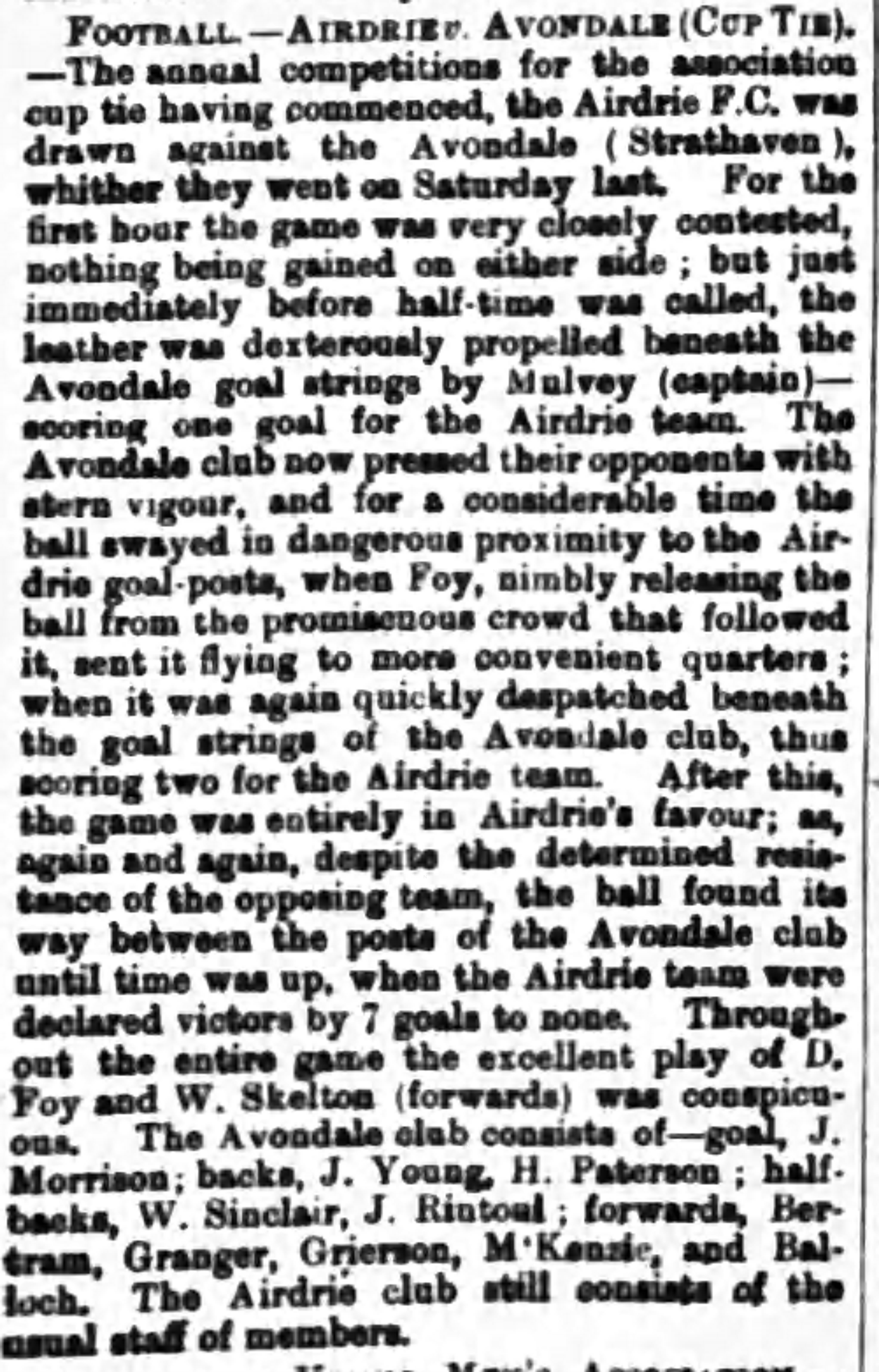
1878–79 Scottish Cup 1st Round, Avondale 0–7 Airdrie, Airdrie Advertiser, 12 October 1878

The club was formed in 1875, making it one of the first four clubs founded in Lanarkshire. It was however a short-lived and unsuccessful club, entering the Scottish Cup three times, but losing the only two ties it played.

It prepared for its first Cup tie in 1877–78 at Hamilton by playing Hamilton's neighbours Hamilton Academical, losing 3–1 (and disputing a fourth goal), and the following week losing 3–0 at home to Jordanhill. In the circumstances it was not surprising that the club lost the tie at South Avenue 1–0.

Its second tie, the following season, was disastrous, the club losing 7–0 at Airdrie, the latter club's biggest-ever Scottish Cup win, despite Airdrie having a smaller membership. Avondale was dissolved before it could play in the first round in 1879–80.

The club was replaced in Strathaven by the Vale of Avon club, which played at a ground owned by Avondale's James Grierson, and originally wore the same colours. The name was revived by an unrelated club from Lennoxtown in 1882.

== Colours ==
The club wore 1" navy blue and white hooped jerseys and hose, with blue knickers.

== Grounds ==
The club played at Townhead, an 8-minute walk from the station.
