= 4th Renfrewshire Rifle Volunteers F.C. =

Association football club in Glasgow City, Scotland

4th R.R.V.
- Full name: 4th Renfrewshire Rifle Volunteers Football Club
- Nickname: the Volunteers
- Founded: 1874
- Dissolved: 1879
- Ground: Renfrew Road/Shawholm Park
- Secretary: De Hort Baird
Home colours

The 4th Renfrewshire Rifle Volunteers Football Club was a 19th-century Scottish association football club based in Pollokshaws, now part of Glasgow.

== History ==
The club was formed out of the 4th Renfrewshire Rifle Volunteers, a company in the Volunteer movement of the British Army. The Volunteers included sporting activities within their purview and newspapers often carried reports of such activities. The growth of football in Scotland, especially thanks to Queen's Park, and the success of army teams in England such as the Royal Engineers, encouraged regiments to form football clubs as part of the physical regimen.

The 4th R.R.V. was formed in 1874, in the vanguard of other Volunteer regimental sides. It was playing matches against external sides at least by the 1875–76 season, by which time it was running two XIs.

The club entered the Scottish Cup for the first time in 1876–77. The club was drawn to play West End in Cowlairs and lost to two first-half goals, "play on both sides being very fast and good".

The Volunteers entered a second time in 1877–78, losing 1–0 to Telegraphists in the first round.

The club entered in the following two years, but scratched before its first round ties, and the club was dissolved after being drawn to face Havelock in the first round of the 1879–80 Scottish Cup before the tie could take place.

== Colours ==
The club originally wore blue jerseys and knickers, with blue and white hose. In 1877 it changed the knickers to white.

== Grounds ==
The club played on the Renfrew Road until 1876, and Shawholm Park afterwards.
