= St Andrew's F.C. (Kilmarnock) =

Association football club in Kilmarnock, Scotland

St Andrew's
- Full name: St Andrew's Football Club
- Founded: 1873
- Dissolved: 1877
- Ground: Holehouse Road
- Captain: J. Lyle, W. Millar
Home colours

St Andrew's Football Club was an association football club from Kilmarnock, Ayrshire in Scotland.

== History ==
The club was founded in 1873.

St Andrew's first entered the Scottish Cup in 1876–77, and was drawn at home to Ayr Eglinton in the first round. The game ended in a 1–1 draw.

The replay was played on 7 October at the neutral Robbsland Park (the ground of Ayr Thistle F.C.) and lasted only an hour, St Andrew's winning 1–0.

In the second round, the club was drawn to play at the Portland club, on the latter's ground at Nursery Park, on Holehouse Road. The home side won 2–0 in a "one-sided game".

The club played matches regularly until the end of the season, the final one advertised being against Rosevale of Strathbungo on 14 April 1877, but the club appears to have wound up before the start of the 1877–78 season, as it scratched from its first round Scottish Cup tie with Ayr Thistle, and did not enter the new Ayrshire Cup.

== Colours ==
The club's colours were black and red hoops.

== Ground ==
The club probably started out playing on public parks, but it had a new ground at Holehouse Road for the 1875–76 season, opening it with a match against a Kilmarnock F.C. scratch XI. It moved to Grange Park in time for its Cup tie with Ayr Eglinton.
