= Lancefield F.C. =

Former association football club in Scotland

Lancefield
- Full name: Lancefield Football Club
- Founded: 1874
- Dissolved: 1882
- Ground: Clifford Park
- Secretary: George Cross
Home colours

Lancefield Football Club was a 19th-century football club based in Govan, near Glasgow.

== History ==
The club claimed a foundation date of 1864, but this is probably the foundation date of the cricket club from which the club seems to have arisen. The earliest matches recorded for the club are from the 1874–75 season.

The club entered the Scottish Cup for the first time in 1876–77. Its first entry was its most successful. The club beat Parkgrove F.C. in the first round, at the latter's ground of Clifford Park, although Parkgrove would move out at the end of the season, allowing Lancefield to move in; Lancefield's two goals came from M'Callum and Jeffrey. Lancefield won through to the quarter-finals, which, given the regional nature of the earlier rounds, was the final 6 of the competition. Lancefield was drawn at home to Ayr Thistle F.C. and the original tie at Brighton Park was the only senior match to survive an overnight snowstorm, ending 2–2. Thistle won the replay thanks to a goal from Cunninghame with about 15 minutes to go.

The club's home defeat in the first round in 1877–78 to Alexandra Athletic F.C. seems to have disheartened the club, as it dropped out of the Scottish Football Association, not rejoining until 1880 when it entered the Scottish Cup for the last time. The club again lost in the first round, 4–2 to the Pilgrims side at Middleton Park, despite the "great credit" of goalkeeper Boyd, who "used both hands and feet cleverly, and saved his charge repeatedly"; S.Lyall of Pilgrims scored all four goals for the home side.

The club continued to play at a lower level, the final match recorded being a 3–1 win over the Ardoch club of Pollokshields at the end of the 1881–82 season. The name was revived by later clubs in Edinburgh; there is reference to one match in 1885, which does not seem to have been the same as this club.

== Colours ==
The club's colours were red and black 3-inch hooped jerseys, white knickerbockers, and red and black stockings. In its final season the club wore navy shirts and white shorts.

== Ground ==
The club originally used Brighton Park as its home, but in the latter part of the 1875–76 season it played matches at Queen's Park, despite it being some distance from Govan; it is possible that, given the number of teams in the locality, the club had some temporary difficulty in securing a pitch. By 1877, the club had moved to Clifford Park, a private ground on Helen Street in Govan, in place of Parkgrove, which had moved to Trinidad Park.
