= Auchinleck Boswell F.C. =

Former association football club in Scotland

Auchinleck Boswell
- Full name: Auchinleck Boswell Football Club
- Founded: 1877
- Dissolved: 1882
- Ground: Glenshamrock Holm
- Secretary: William Caldow
Home colours

Auchinleck Boswell Football Club was an association football club from Auchinleck, Ayrshire, Scotland.

== History ==
Auchinleck Boswell was formed in 1877. The club took its name from the Boswell family, which had held the lairdship of the village since 1504.

Boswell entered the Scottish Cup from 1878–79 until 1881–82. It played four ties and lost them all, including a 7–1 home defeat to Cumnock in 1880–81, the latter side's first Scottish Cup win after five years of trying.

The club did gain a walkover against Kilmarnock Dean in its last entry, so played in the second round for the only time. It suffered another 7–1 defeat, this time at Kilmarnock, although it startled the home fans by taking the lead inside five minutes, and holding onto it until almost half-time. The kicking of one of the backs (Devlin) was praised for "being sure - never once missing - and much admired".

Boswell had a little more success in the Ayrshire Cup, beating Cumnock Bute 3–0 in its first match in the competition in 1878–79, but losing at Kilbirnie in the second. Boswell entered the competition in the following three seasons, but lost twice and scratched once. Its 13–0 defeat at Kilmarnock Athletic in the first round in 1881–82 was the club's last competitive match and in August 1882 the club was removed from the Scottish Football Association membership roll for not paying its subscription.

== Colours ==
The club wore one-inch black and white hooped jerseys, white knickers, and black and white hooped hose.

== Ground ==
The club's first ground was Darson Park, 10 minutes' walk from Auchinleck railway station. In 1879 the club moved to Glenshamrock Holm.
