= Ayrshire Football Association =

Ayrshire Football Association or Ayrshire Football League or variation, may refer to:

- Ayrshire Football League (1891–1895; 1900–1901)
- Ayrshire Football Combination (1893–1897)
- Ayrshire and Renfrewshire Football League (1903–1905)
- Ayrshire Junior Football League (1919–2002)
- Ayrshire Amateur Football Association (est. 1935)
