= Ayr Eglinton F.C. =

Former association football club in Scotland

Ayr Eglinton
- Full name: Ayr Eglinton Football Club
- Founded: 1875
- Dissolved: 1876
- Ground: Eglinton Park
- Secretary: John Watt
Home colours

Ayr Eglinton Football Club was a short-lived association football club from Ayr, Scotland. The club was one of the ancestral clubs to the current Scottish League club Ayr United.

== History ==
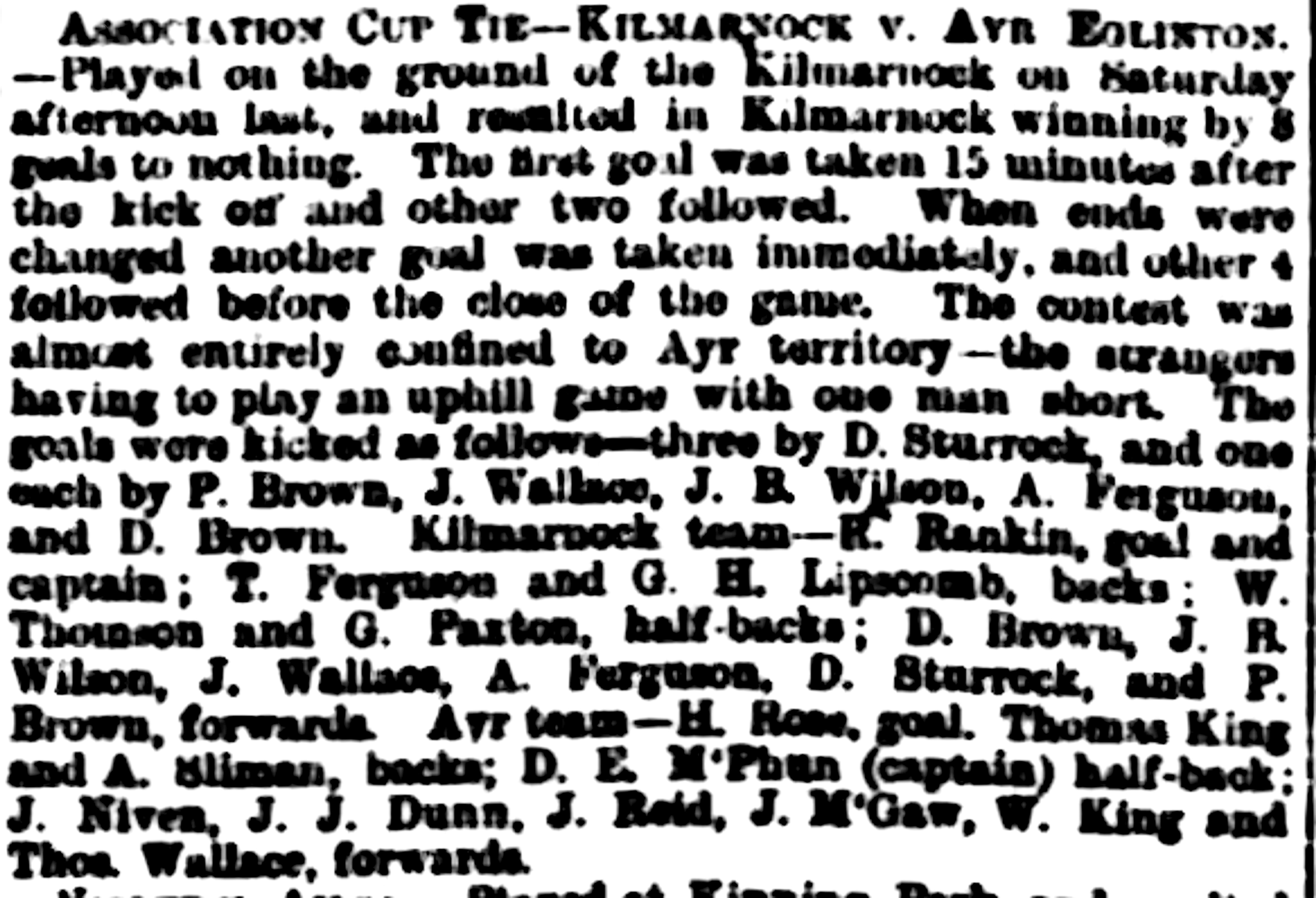
Kilmarnock 8–0 Ayr Eglinton, Scottish Cup First Round, North British Daily Mail, 11 October 1875

The club was formed in 1875. Its first reported association match was in the 1875–76 Scottish Cup against Kilmarnock. The club turned up without its full complement of players, and was beaten 8–0. The club finished its first season with 5 wins, 8 draws, and 6 defeats.

The club was drawn at St Andrew's of Kilmarnock in the first round of the 1876–77 Scottish Cup, on the latter's new Grange Park ground, and Eglinton earned a replay with a 1–1 draw. Only 2 of the players from the 1875 tie played in the 1876 tie, and four of the new players came from the Highet family, including a father and son. The side included at least 5 players who had played for Ayr Academy F.C. in friendlies the previous season, 4 of whom had played in the academy side which beat Eglinton 2–0 in November 1875.

The replay was played on 7 October at the neutral Robbsland Park (the ground of Ayr Thistle F.C.) and lasted only an hour, St Andrew's winning 1–0.

The following weekend, in a meeting at the Ayr Assembly Rooms that weekend, it was "unanimously agreed" to merge the academy and Eglinton clubs, to form a new club, Ayr Academicals.

== Colours ==
The club wore scarlet and black hoops, with blue (serge) knickers.

== Ground ==
The club played at Eglinton Park, from which the club took its name. The club used the Athole Hotel in Alloway Street to provide changing facilities.
