= Mauchline F.C. =

Former association football club in East Ayrshire, Scotland

Mauchline
- Full name: Mauchline Football Club
- Nickname: the Boxmakers
- Founded: 1873
- Dissolved: 1897
- Ground: Connel Park, Mauchline
- Secretary: William Murray, John Paton
- League: Ayrshire Football League (1891–1892); South of Scotland Football League (1892–1993)
Home colours

Mauchline Football Club was a senior football team based in the small town of Mauchline in East Ayrshire.

== History ==
The club was founded in 1873. Its first match against another side was in February 1874, against Ayr Academy.

The club was known as a cup team, appearing in every Scottish Cup from 1875–76 to 1885–86 (and intermittently thereafter), and often reaching the later rounds. Its best run was to the quarter-finals in 1877–78, at which stage the club lost 3–1 at Renton, going behind in the first three minutes after the ball was scrimmaged into the goal, but equalizing through M'Ilveen, who put in a "beautiful long shot" from near the corner-flag which saw even the Renton fans applaud. Renton however scored two second-half goals, the first from another scrimmage, to win through.

In the same season, the club won the Ayrshire Cup for the only time, beating Portland 4–2 in the final, played at Holm Quarry, the home ground for a number of other Kilmarnock sides. The match proved to be a test between the Portland's wider wing play and Mauchline's more compact forward line; Portland's opening goal was a Goldie header from a Sinclair corner, and the club went 2–1 up after Mauchline's back Wilson impeded his goalkeeper, but two goals in the last 20 minutes won the trophy for Mauchline. Portland had a measure of revenge in 1878–79 by winning the Burns Cup, an invitational tournament to raise funds for a statue to Robert Burns, coming from behind to beat Mauchline 2–1 in the final - the first time the Portland had beaten the Mauchline. The club remained competitive within Ayrshire, but after 1880 had a distinct falling-off, with suspicion about the bona fides of the registrations of at least two of their players, resulting in the Ayrshire FA tightening residency requirements.

Mauchline was an original member the Ayrshire Football League in 1891–92, but only played in it for one unsuccessful season The following season it was a founder member of the South of Scotland Football League, but the season was never played out, and the championship abandoned.

A second Mauchline Football Club was founded in 1911 and existed until 1922 although all competitions were suspended throughout the First World War, 1914–1918.

== Colours ==
The club played in blue and white hooped jerseys and hose, with white knickers.

== Ground ==
The club's ground at Connel Park was a 3-minute walk from the Mauchline railway station. As late as 1886 the club did not have facilities on the ground, teams having to change at the Loudoun Hotel.

== Notable players ==
- Dr John Smith gained four of his ten Scottish caps whilst a Mauchline player, scoring three goals; he was the sole club representative to have been selected for international duty.
- Hughie Wilson played for the club until 1884.
- W. H. Campbell of Mauchline F.C. finished second in the Scottish long jump championship of 1888.
