= 1874 Scottish Cup final =

- Event: 1873–74 Scottish Cup
Queen's Park	Clydesdale
2	0
- Date: 21 March 1874
- Venue: Hampden Park, Crosshill
- Referee: James McIntyre (Eastern)
- Attendance: 2,500
- Weather: Windy

The 1874 Scottish Cup final was the inaugural final of the Scottish Cup and the final of the 1873–74 Scottish Cup, the most prestigious knockout football competition in Scotland. The match took place at Hampden Park on 21 March 1874 and was contested by Queen's Park and Clydesdale.

Queen's Park won the match 2–0 with goals from Billy MacKinnon and Robert Leckie. Subscription fees from 15 of these clubs were used to pay for the Scottish Cup trophy which the teams would compete for. The trophy is the oldest in association football and is also the oldest national trophy in the world.

== Background ==
Following the foundation of The Football Association in 1863 and the success of their FA Cup, established in 1871, the committee of Queen's Park convened a meeting in Dewar's Hotel, Glasgow on 13 March 1873 to form the Scottish Football Association. Seven clubs attended the meeting; Clydesdale, Dumbreck, Eastern, Granville, Queen's Park, Vale of Leven and 3rd Lanark RV while the eighth founding member – Kilmarnock – intimated by letter their support. The founding members decided to establish their own annual competition and thus the Scottish Football Association Challenge Cup was born. Subscription fees from these eight clubs plus seven of the other eight to enter the inaugural competition were used to pay for the Scottish Cup trophy which the teams would compete for. Unlike the FA Cup, the original trophy is still awarded to the winners of the competition.

== Route to the final ==
Both clubs entered the competition in the first round. Queen's Park won all of their matches before the final at the first attempt whilst Clydesdale need two replays to see off 3rd Lanark RV in the quarter-finals.

=== Queen's Park ===
Round	Opposition	Score
First round	Dumbreck	7–0
Quarter-final	Eastern	1–0
Semi-final	Renton	2–0

Queen's Park entered the competition in the first round and defeated Dumbreck with an emphatic 7–0 victory on 25 October 1873. In the quarter-finals the club faced Eastern, producing a 1–0 win to progress to the first semi-final. The club eliminated Renton in a 2–0 win to complete a hat-trick of clean sheets in the tournament and qualify for the final of the first ever Scottish Cup.

=== Clydesdale ===
Round	Opposition	Score
First round	Granville	6–0
Quarter-final	3rd Lanark RV	1–1
Quarter-final replay	3rd Lanark RV	0–0
Quarter-final second replay	3rd Lanark RV	2–0
Semi-final	Blythswood	4–0

Along with Queen's Park, Clydesdale produced an emphatic victory in the first round, defeating Granville 6–0 in what would be Granville's only competitive match. In the next round the club faced 3rd Lanarkshire Rifle Volunteers where the first two matches ended in draws forcing replays. The original fixture ended 1–1 and the first replay 0–0. In the second replay of the fixture, Clydesdale overcame their opponents 2–0 to progress the semi-final stage. The club faced Blythswood at Kinning Park and won 4–0 to progress to the first Scottish Cup final.

== Match ==
=== Report ===
Queen's Park and Clydesdale took to the pitch at a windy Hampden Park on 21 March 1874. The match kicked-off at quarter to four, Clydesdale with the disadvantage of having the wind in their faces.

In the first half Clydesdale controversially had a goal ruled out. Queen's Park protested when referee James McIntyre initially appeared to award a goal after Fred Anderson kicked the ball past Queen's goalkeeper John Dickson. There were no goal nets to catch the ball if it had been placed between the posts and it was claimed that Anderson's shot had rebounded off a spectator's knee. Had the goal been allowed to stand, the teams would have changed ends according to the rules at the time and Clydesdale would gain the advantage of having the wind behind them.

Instead, Queen's Park retained that advantage and, early in the second half, Billy MacKinnon gave them the lead with "a powerful shot after a superb individual run". Robert Leckie scored Queen's Park's second goal with a shot not long before time was called.

=== Details ===
21 March 1874
15:45

Queen's Park	2–0	Clydesdale
B. MacKinnon 65'; Leckie 80'

Hampden Park, Crosshill
Attendance: 2,500
Referee: James McIntyre (Eastern)

QUEEN'S PARK:
GK	John Dickson
FB	Joseph Taylor
FB	Robert W. Neill
HB	Charles Campbell
HB	James J. Thomson (c)
FW	Robert Leckie
FW	Jerry Weir
FW	Angus MacKinnon
FW	Billy MacKinnon
FW	Henry McNeil
FW	Thomas Lawrie
Coach:
(Scotland) Archibald Rae

CLYDESDALE:
GK	Robert Gardner (c)
FB	David Wotherspoon
FB	James McAuley
HB	Ebenezer Hendry
HB	A.H. Raeburn
FW	Fred Anderson
FW	James Lang
FW	John McPherson
FW	William Gibb
FW	James Kennedy
FW	James Wilson
