= West End F.C. (Glasgow) =

Association football club in Glasgow City, Scotland

West End
- Full name: West End Football Club
- Founded: 1873
- Dissolved: 1878
- Ground: Avenue Park
- Secretary: Hugh McColl, Robert Clark
Home colours

West End Football Club was a Scottish association football club based in Cowlairs, Glasgow.

== History ==
The club was founded in August 1873 out of a cricket club. The club's name was often given as West-end or West-End, although for its first couple of matches the name was given as West-End Wanderers, and the side said to be made up of footballers and cricketers.

The club competed in the Scottish Cup for four seasons between 1874 and 1878, winning its first tie against Star of Leven at home with three unanswered second-half goals, but being unlucky enough in its first season to be drawn against Queen's Park; West End lost 7–0 in a "rough" game, "West End considering that charging was the play".

The club's best run came in 1876–77. The club beat Govan in the second round in a confusing game; the result was reported as both 1–0 and 1–1, presumably because of a disputed Govan goal, and Govan issued a protest to the Scottish Football Association, which was dismissed. In the third round (last 21), West End drew at home to the Edinburgh Swifts; after the match the teams dined together at the Athole Arms Hotel. The replay however did not take place. West End was disqualified for "not playing Swifts in accordance with the rules", and the Swifts were placed in the fourth round.

The club's last recorded fixture was against South Western in March 1878. The club's first secretary, Hugh McColl, later worked in Chile, and was instrumental in the foundation of Valparaíso F.C., Chile's first football club.

== Colours ==
The club's colours were originally given as white and blue. By 1874 the colours had changed to amber & black; from 1876 they were given as orange and black, but may have been the same kit.

== Ground ==
The cricket club moved into Burnbank Park in 1873, just before forming the football section; Blythswood F.C. also played cricket there, and adopted football in August 1873, which may have been an influence on West End doing so the same month. One early difficulty the club had was that it had leased its cricket pitch to the Glasgow Academicals for rugby before taking up football, so could not use it during its first season. It was however able to use it from the 1874–75 season.

From the 1875–76 season, the club moved to Avenue Park in Cowlairs, with Rangers taking over at Burnbank; a consequence was that the cricket section wound up.
