= 1873–74 Scottish Cup =

Inaugural Scottish Cup football competition

Tournament details
- Country: Scotland
- Teams: 16

Final positions
- Champions: Queen's Park (first title)
- Runners-up: Clydesdale

Tournament statistics
- Matches played: 16
- Goals scored: 38 (2.38 per match)

The 1873–74 Scottish Cup – officially the Scottish Football Association Challenge Cup – was the first season of Scotland's most prestigious football knockout competition. A total of 16 teams from the west of Scotland entered the competition, but only 14 played a match after two teams withdrew. The competition began with a match between Renton and Kilmarnock on 18 October 1873 and concluded with the final on 21 March 1874. After 16 matches and 38 goals, the inaugural cup was won by Queen's Park who defeated fellow Glasgow club Clydesdale 2–0 in the final.

The sixteen teams that entered the competition consisted of the eight founder members of the Scottish Football Association (SFA) – namely Clydesdale, Dumbreck, Eastern, Granville, Kilmarnock, Queen's Park, Vale of Leven and the 3rd Lanarkshire Rifle Volunteers – as well as Alexandra Athletic, Blythswood, Callander, Dumbarton, Renton, Rovers, Southern and Western. Subscription fees from 15 of these clubs were used to pay for the Scottish Cup trophy which the teams would compete for. Unlike the FA Cup, the original trophy is still awarded to the winners of the competition. It is the oldest trophy in association football and the oldest national trophy in the world. (Note: The four constituent countries of the United Kingdom (England, Northern Ireland, Scotland and Wales) are represented separately in association football and each has its own national trophy.)

== Background ==
Queen's Park had been founded in July 1867 and became the first Scottish club to join the previously solely England-based Football Association three years later. They had contributed to the cost of the FA Cup trophy and entered the competition in its inaugural season. However, the cost of travelling to England for matches was prohibitive. In both 1872 and 1873, they were forced to withdraw from the competition in the semi-finals.

In March 1873, the club took out an advertisement in a Glasgow newspaper to invite football clubs to a meeting in the Dewar's Hotel with the intention of discussing the formation of a football association for Scotland. The club's secretary Archibald Rae also wrote a letter to a number of clubs, including Kilmarnock – who had been influenced by Queen's Park to play association football rather than rugby – to invite them to the meeting. Committee members from Queen's Park were joined by representatives from six other clubs – Clydesdale, Vale of Leven, Dumbreck, the 3rd Lanarkshire Rifle Volunteers (more commonly known as 3rd Lanark RV or 3rd LRV), Eastern and Granville – at the meeting and a letter of support was received from Kilmarnock who were unable to attend. The eight clubs agreed to establish the Scottish Football Association (SFA) and resolved that:

The clubs here represented form themselves into an association for the promotion of football according to the rules of The Football Association and that the clubs connected with this association subscribe for a challenge cup to be played for annually, the committee to propose the laws of the competition.

Eight further teams joined the SFA over the next few months and subscription fees from fifteen of the members were used to pay for the trophy; the only non-contributor was Southern, which was also the last club to enter. The Scottish Cup is the oldest trophy in association football. It has been awarded to the winner of every edition of the competition and is competed for on an annual basis by SFA member clubs.

== Format ==
As 16 teams entered the competition, the first edition of the Scottish Cup took on the format of a straightforward knockout tournament. In future years, the number of entrants would expand to regularly include over 100 teams which resulted in the need for byes before the introduction of the Scottish Football League in 1890 and the Scottish Qualifying Cup in 1895.

For the first round, the names of the 16 teams were placed into a single lot and drawn into pairs. The home team for each tie was determined by the toss of a coin unless it was mutually agreed or only one of the two clubs drawn against one another had a private ground. In the event of a draw, the team who lost the toss would have the choice of ground for the replay. This process was repeated for the quarter-finals and semi-finals. The choice of venue for the final and any replay(s) was reserved to the SFA.

=== Rules ===
The inaugural competition was played according to the rules of The Football Association, known as the Laws of the Game. Matches were 90 minutes long with a break after 45 minutes. Pitches could be no more than 200 yards (180 m) by 100 yards (91 m) and goals were marked by two upright posts at either end, 8 yards (7.3 m) apart, with tape between them at height of 8 feet (2.4 m). A coin toss decided the ends each team would shoot towards and which team would kick off. A goal was scored when the ball passed between the posts below the tape. Ends were changed after each goal was scored unless no goals were scored in the first half. In the event that no goals were scored in the first half, ends would only be changed at half time. A player was considered "out of play" if he was nearer to the goal than a teammate who kicked the ball to him, unless there were at least three opponents between him and the goal. Players who were out of play could not touch the ball or prevent any other players from doing so until they were back "in play". The rules specifically forbade players from kicking and hacking their opponents as well as from wearing "projecting nails, iron plates or gutta-percha" on the soles of their boots.

=== Teams ===
All 16 teams entered the competition in the first round. Of the clubs that entered, eight were founder members of the SFA. Those included Clydesdale, Granville, Queen's Park and 3rd Lanark RV from Renfrewshire as well as Dumbreck from Lanarkshire, Eastern from Glasgow, Ayrshire side Kilmarnock and Vale of Leven from Dunbartonshire. A further five Glasgow clubs – Alexandra Athletic, Blythswood, Callander, Rovers, and Western – entered alongside Dumbarton and Renton from Dunbartonshire and Southern from Renfrewshire.

Of the 16 teams to enter the first round, Southern were the only team who would not play a single match in any edition of the Scottish Cup. By 1967, all the teams had become defunct except for Dumbarton, Kilmarnock, Queen's Park and Vale of Leven and, as of 2026, only the first three of these still compete regularly in the competition.

=== Calendar ===
Round	Date	Fixtures				Clubs	New entries this round
Round	Date	Original	Replays	Walkovers	Byes	Clubs	New entries this round
First round	18 - 25 October 1873	8	0	0	0	16 → 8	16
Quarter-finals	8 November - 6 December 1873	4	3	0	0	8 → 4	none
Semi-finals	13 - 20 December 1873	2	0	0	0	4 → 2	none
Final	21 March 1874	1	0	0	0	2 → 1	none

== First round ==
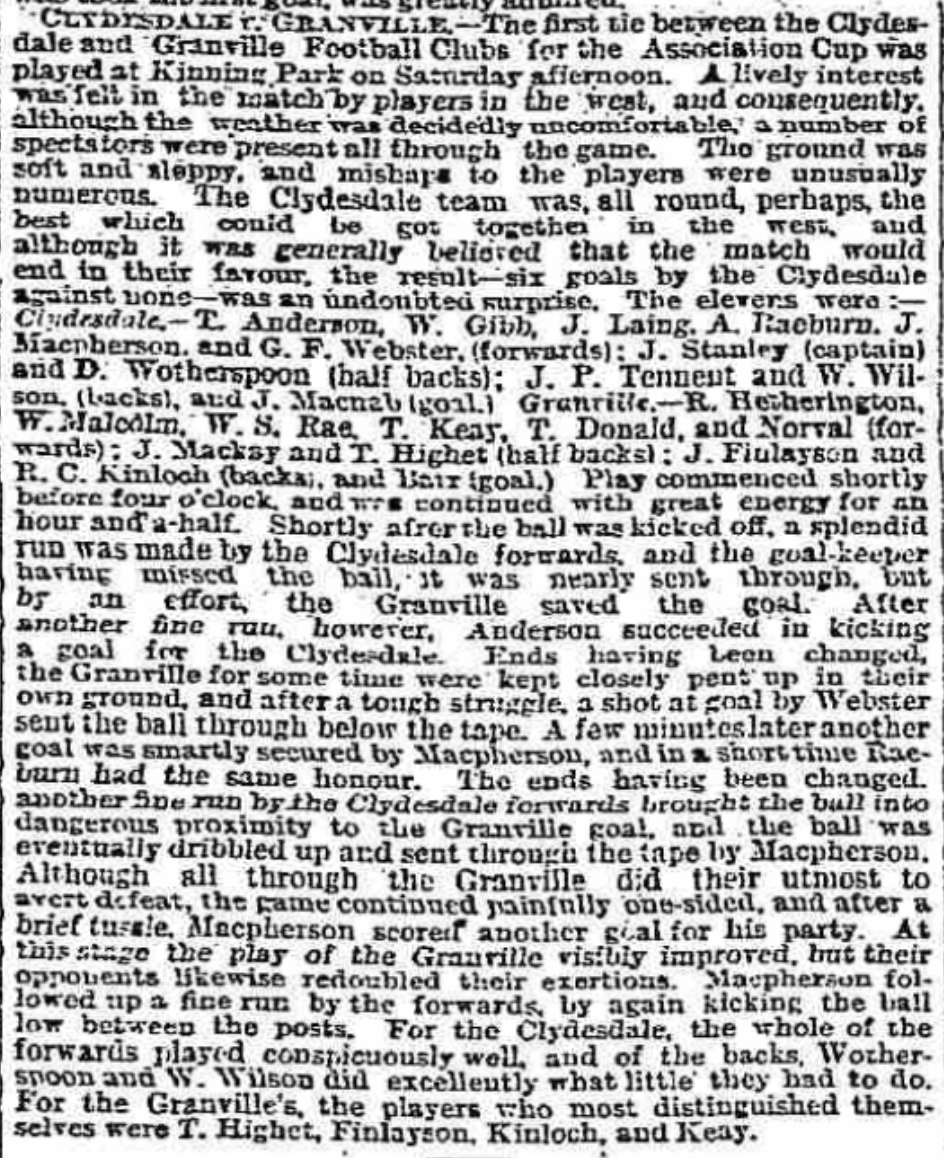
Report from the Clydesdale vs. Granville first round match in the North British Daily Mail of 27 October 1873.

At a committee meeting of the Scottish Football Association on 9 October 1873, the first round ties were drawn. The first match took place on 18 October 1873 when Renton defeated Kilmarnock (who played the entire match with 10 players) 2–0 in the first round. The match was played in Crosshill, at the neutral Hampden Park. Newspaper reports from the time suggest Kilmarnock may have been at a disadvantage as they were more used to playing rugby. Later on the same day, Alexandra Athletic and Eastern recorded wins over Callander and Rovers respectively and the following week Queen's Park began the competition with a 7–0 win over Dumbreck in the highest scoring game in the inaugural competition. John McPherson scored the first ever Scottish Cup hat-trick as Clydesdale defeated Granville 6–0 in what would be the latter's only Scottish Cup match and Blythswood won 1–0 away to Western.

Southern and Vale of Leven scratched their first round matches against Dumbarton and 3rd Lanark RV respectively.

First round results
Date	Home team	Score	Away team	Venue
18 October 1873	Renton	2–0	Kilmarnock	Hampden Park, Crosshill (Note: Played at a neutral venue)
18 October 1873	Eastern	4–0	Rovers	Flesher's Haugh, Glasgow
18 October 1873	Alexandra Athletic	2–0	Callander	Kennyhill Park, Glasgow
25 October 1873	Queen's Park	7–0	Dumbreck	Hampden Park, Crosshill
25 October 1873	Western	0–1	Blythswood	Regent's Park, Glasgow
25 October 1873	Clydesdale	6–0	Granville	Kinning Park, Kinning Park
	3rd Lanark RV	w/o (Note: Southern scratched and 3rd Lanark RV advanced to the quarter-finals.)	Southern	
	Dumbarton	w/o (Note: Vale of Leven scratched and Dumbarton advanced to the quarter-finals.)	Vale of Leven	

== Quarter-finals ==
The quarter-final stage began on 8 November 1873 when Clydesdale and 3rd Lanark RV drew 1–1 at Kinning Park to set up the first Scottish Cup replay eight days later. This match also finished in a draw meaning a second replay was played on 6 December. In the meantime, Dumbarton lost 1–0 to Renton in a replay on a public park in Renton on 29 November 1873 after the first match had finished goalless a week earlier at the same venue. Queen's Park's match against Eastern was due to kick off at 15:00 but, due to the late arrival of the Eastern captain, kick-off was delayed by 20 minutes and the match was abandoned with 10 minutes still to play due to darkness as a result. Queen's Park were leading 1–0 and the result was allowed to stand. Blythswood also reached the semi-finals without the need for a replay as they defeated Alexandra Athletic 2–0. In the last match of the quarter-final stage, Clydesdale defeated 3rd Lanark RV 2–0 at Kinning Park in their second replay.

Quarter-final results
Date	Home team	Score	Away team	Venue
8 November 1873	Clydesdale	1–1	3rd Lanark RV	Kinning Park, Kinning Park
22 November 1873	Queen's Park	1–0	Eastern	Hampden Park, Crosshill
22 November 1873	Renton	0–0	Dumbarton	Public park, Renton
22 November 1873	Alexandra Athletic	0–2	Blythswood	Kennyhill Park, Glasgow

Quarter-final replays
Date	Home team	Score	Away team	Venue
16 November 1873	Clydesdale	0–0	3rd Lanark RV	Kinning Park, Kinning Park
29 November 1873	Renton	1–0	Dumbarton	Public park, Renton

Quarter-final second replay
Date	Home team	Score	Away team	Venue
6 December 1873	Clydesdale	2–0	3rd Lanark RV	Kinning Park, Kinning Park

== Semi-finals ==
The two semi-final matches were played a week apart in December 1873. Queen's Park were the first team to reach the final as they defeated Renton 2–0 at the original Hampden Park on 13 December. Clydesdale then booked their place in the inaugural final a week later as they recorded a 4–0 win over Blythswood at Kinning Park. The match had been abandoned after the fourth goal due to darkness but the result was allowed to stand.

Semi-final results
Date	Home team	Score	Away team	Venue
13 December 1873	Queen's Park	2–0	Renton	Hampden Park, Crosshill
20 December 1873	Clydesdale	4–0	Blythswood	Kinning Park, Kinning Park

== Final ==
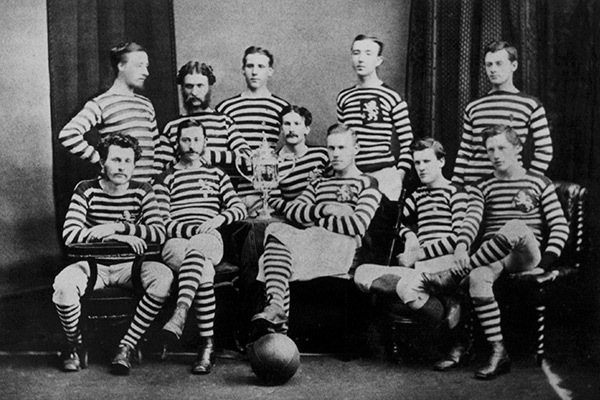
The Queen's Park players who won the 1874 Scottish Cup final.

After 15 matches played and 36 goals scored, the tournament culminated in the 1874 Scottish Cup final on 21 March 1874. The match, played at the original Hampden Park in Crosshill, was watched by 2,500 spectators and refereed by James McIntyre of Eastern. As Hampden Park was the home of finalists Queen's Park, the match was one of a few cup finals in Scotland that were not played on neutral territory.

Both goals came in the second half courtesy of the Scotland internationals Billy MacKinnon and Robert Leckie. Queen's Park won 2–0 to claim the trophy for the first of their 10 triumphs.

21 March 1874
15:00

Queen's Park	2–0	Clydesdale
MacKinnon 60'; Leckie 85'

Hampden Park, Crosshill
Attendance: 2,500
Referee: James McIntyre (Eastern)

== See also ==
- 1873–74 in Scottish football
