= 1873–74 in Scottish football =

Football in Scotland
- Season: 1873–74

1873–74 in Scottish football

Scottish Cup winners
- Queen's Park

Season 1873–74 was the first in Scottish football to feature competitive domestic fixtures, with the introduction of the Scottish Cup.

== Overview ==
Financial obstacles had badly hindered Queen's Park's attempts to compete for the FA Cup in the previous two seasons, with only one match actually being played. As a result, although retaining membership of the Football Association, Queen's elected not to enter for the cup on this occasion (neither would they compete in the next two seasons). Instead, there was now a domestic equivalent to compete for, the Scottish Football Association (founded in March of the previous season) having instituted its own challenge cup competition modelled on the English tournament – the Scottish Cup.

As well as the international fixture with England, which returned to Partick in March, cross-border rivalry was also fuelled with the introduction of what became a prestige representative fixture of the late 19th century, an inter-city match between Glasgow and Sheffield.

== Scottish Cup ==
Sixteen clubs entered the draw for the first round of the first ever Scottish Cup tournament, which was organised on the same unseeded, straight knockout basis as the FA Cup. The trophy and a set of medals were purchased as a result of subscription by member clubs at a cost of £56 12s 11d.

Although details of several matches are sketchy, the first round match between Renton and Kilmarnock at Crosshill (then an independent burgh from Glasgow) on 18 October 1873 was the first match to get underway in the competition, and therefore the first competitive club fixture on Scottish soil.

Queen's Park went on to underline their position as the pre-eminent club in Scottish football by lifting the trophy. After wins over Dumbreck, Eastern and Renton, they secured the Scottish Cup with a 2–0 victory over Clydesdale in the final.

== Scotland national team ==
=== Overview ===
The international against England took place at Partick in March. Staged almost exactly a year on from the inaugural London clash, it established a pattern of the fixture taking place on an annual basis in the latter part of the season, with home advantage alternating. Scotland conceded the opener, but with goals either side of half time, secured their first ever international victory.

=== Results ===
Date	Venue	Opponents	Score	Competition	Scotland scorer(s)
7 March 1874	Hamilton Crescent, Partick	England	2–1	Friendly	Fred Anderson, Angus MacKinnon

== Representative matches ==
As well as selecting a team for the international fixture, the SFA were also responsible for the Glasgow side chosen to face their Sheffield counterparts (there was no Glasgow Football Association prior to 1883).

14 March 1874: (England) Sheffield 2 (Scotland) Glasgow 2 (Bramall Lane, Sheffield)

== Notes and references ==
- Smailes, Gordon (1995). The Breedon Book of Scottish Football Records. Derby: Breedon Books. ISBN 1-85983-020-X.
