= Charles Heggie =

Scottish footballer

Charles Winton Heggie (26 September 1862 – 15 July 1925) was a Scottish footballer who played for Rangers, St Bernard's and the Scotland national team. He is one of just two players to have scored four goals in their only Scotland appearance.

== Career ==
Heggie began his career at Govan based club Ailsa FC before joining Rangers in 1882. At Rangers he initially played as a defender but moved to a forward position for much of the 1883–84 season and finished the season as the club's top scorer with 13 goals in 30 matches. In these early years of football, with the exception of the Scottish Cup, Rangers only contested friendly matches but Heggie helped Rangers reach the Cup semi-finals, scoring in a 5–1 win against Cambuslang in the quarter-finals.

The following season, he only played 7 times for Rangers, scoring 5 goals, but was a regular again in 1885–86 with 29 goals in 31 games. His only Scotland appearance was against Ireland on 20 March 1886 at Ballynafeigh Park, Belfast. Scotland won the match 7–2 and Heggie scored four of the Scotland goals. Heggie holds the distinction of being one of just two players in Scottish football history to have scored 4 goals in their only international cap; two years later William Dickson would repeat the feat, again against Ireland.

The Scottish Umpire and Cycling Mercury noted in October 1886 that:

It is an open secret that the Rangers and C. Heggie, their crack centre are at loggerheads. It would not reflect credit on either party if we rehearsed the cause of this unfortunate breach, but the sooner it is satisfactorily bridged over the better for all concerned. The Rangers, from present appearances and performances, can't get on very well without Heggie, although they may imagine so and Heggie shows to most advantage when he is in harness. Come down from your stools both of you and don't spoil by your stiffneckedness a season that has opened auspiciously, and which under prudent management should end gloriously."

Unsurprisingly perhaps, the 1886–87 season proved to be his last at Rangers and he played 8 matches, scoring 3 times. After his spell with Rangers he moved to St. Bernard's in January 1887. This proved to be his final club; however he remained within football as a referee. Heggie later emigrated to Western Australia, where he died in 1925.

== See also ==
- List of Scotland national football team hat-tricks
