= Dennistoun F.C. =

Association football club in Glasgow City, Scotland

Dennistoun
- Full name: Dennistoun Football Club
- Founded: 1875
- Dissolved: 1880
- Ground: Onslow Park
- Secretary: James W. Bowie
Home colours

Dennistoun Football Club was a Scottish association football club based in Dennistoun, in Glasgow.

== History ==
The club was founded in 1875, the earliest recorded match being at home to Abercorn in January 1876. Its first entry onto the wider stage was when entering the Scottish Cup in 1876–77, losing 3–1 at Dumbreck, the opening goal being a corner-kick that goalkeeper Brown fumbled over the line; the club claimed to have won 15 and drawn 6 of its 24 matches during the season.

In the 1877–78 Scottish Cup, the club was drawn against Clydesdale, who had been runners-up in the first competition four years before. Clydesdale won 3–0 in a "one-sided" game, but never won another Cup tie; the clubs were drawn together again in the first round in 1878–79, and the rapidly disintegrating Clydesdale "conceded a bye" to Dennistoun. However Dennistoun also withdrew before the second round was drawn.

The following season, the club was suspended from the Scottish Football Association for playing a pre-season four-a-side tournament on the "professional ground at Shawfield". After apologizing to the SFA, the club was re-admitted. Although the first round of the Cup had already been played, Dennistoun was allowed to enter at the second round stage, where it lost 5–1 at Pollokshields Athletic.

Dennistoun finished the 1879–80 season on a high, as it won the inaugural Royal Standard and Grand National Challenge Cup, for clubs in the Gorbals area of Glasgow. In the final at Kennyhill Park on 17 April, Dennistoun beat Thistle 1–0, the winning goal coming after 55 minutes via a deflected shot from the left wing, and Thistle having an equalizer disallowed. However it was also the last hurrah for the club. It entered the Scottish Cup in 1880–81, but did not play its fixture with Partick Thistle, and, at a meeting on 30 October 1880, a motion dissolving the club was passed.

== Colours ==
The club wore navy blue.

== Ground ==
The club originally played at Onslow Park, two minutes' walk from the Dennistoun car stop. The ground was also the home of Harmonic Good Templars and was re-occupied in 1882 by Whitehill, which later took the name Dennistoun Athletic. For its final season, the club played at Haghill Park.
