= St Andrew's F.C. (Glasgow) =

Football club in Glasgow, Scotland

St Andrew's
- Full name: St Andrew's Football Club
- Founded: 1874
- Dissolved: 1876
- Ground: Glasgow Green
- Captain: Thomas Shirra

St Andrew's Football Club was a short-lived Scottish football club based in the city of Glasgow.

== History ==
The club was formed in 1874. Its first recorded match was a 1–0 win over the Ramblers club at the latter's Queen's Park ground, thanks to a goal "taken in capital style" by Marshall, who dribbled past the Ramblers' half-backs and putting in a shot just under the tape.

St Andrew's had enough members to form two sides by 1875 as the second XI beat the Hamilton Academical F.C. second XI 1–0 in September that year.

The club's only entry to the Scottish Cup was in 1875–76. In the first round the club beat Telegraphists F.C. at home 3–0; St Andrew's held the Telegraphists off in the first half, playing into a heavy wind, but scored three times in the first 15 minutes of the second.

In the second round, the club lost 2–0 against Dumbreck F.C. at Ibroxhill, with a third Dumbreck goal not allowed as the umpires could not agree on an offside.

The last listed fixture for the club was at Lancefield F.C. in January 1876. For the 1876–77 season, at least three of the St Andrew's players are found playing for Alexandra Athletic.

== Ground ==
In common with a number of other Glasgow clubs, the club used the Glasgow Green whenever hosting matches.

== Notable players ==
- Sam Ricketts, later a Rangers player and official, played for the side in 1874.
