= 1874–75 Vale of Leven F.C. season =

Vale of Leven
1874–75 season
- Stadium: North Street Park
- Scottish Cup: First round

The 1874–75 season was the first season of competitive football by Vale of Leven.

Vale had entered the inaugural Scottish Cup in 1873–74 but withdrew from the competition without playing a match.

== Scottish Cup ==
Vale of Leven entered the Scottish Cup for the second time. They played their first match against Clydesdale at home but withdrew from the competition after the match which had finished 0–0.

| Date | Round | Opponents | H / A | Result F–A | Scorers | Attendance |
|---|---|---|---|---|---|---|
| 24 October 1874 | First round | Clydesdale | A | 0–0 | | |
| October 1874 | First round replay | Clydesdale | H | Walkover | | |
