= 1877–78 Hibernian F.C. season =

Hibernian
1877–78 season
- Scottish Cup: Fifth Round (vs. South Western)
- Edinburgh FA Cup: Final (vs. Hearts)

Season 1877–78 was the first in which Hibernian competed at a Scottish national level, entering the Scottish Cup for the first time.

== Overview ==
Hibs reached the fifth round of the Scottish Cup, losing 3–1 to South Western. They had defeated Edinburgh derby rivals Hearts in the first round after a replay. The fourth round match against Thornliebank was highly unusual. Hibs won the first match 2–1, but the Scottish Football Association decided to consider the result a draw and ordered a replay. After the replay ended in a 2–2 draw, both clubs were admitted to the fifth round of the competition.

Later that season, Hibs and Hearts contested the final of the Edinburgh FA Cup. Hearts eventually won the local competition after a fourth replay, with the decisive match (won 3–2 by Hearts) played over two months after the first attempt. The long running saga established Hibs and Hearts as the predominant clubs in Edinburgh. The Edinburgh derby, as it would become known, is the second oldest regularly played derby match, after the Nottingham derby between Notts County and Nottingham Forest.

== Results ==
All results are written with Hibs' score first.

=== Scottish Cup ===
Date	Round	Opponent	Venue	Result	Attendance	Scorers	Ref
29 September 1877	R1	Hearts	East Meadows	0–0			
6 October 1877	R1	Hearts	East Meadows	2–1			
20 October 1877	R2	Hanover	East Meadows	1–1			
27 October 1877	R2	Hanover	East Meadows	3–0			
10 November 1877	R3	Edinburgh Swifts	East Meadows	2–0			
1 December 1877	R4	Thornliebank	Pollokshaws	2–1			
8 December 1877	R4	Thornliebank	Mayfield Park, Newington	2–2			
29 December 1877	R5	South Western	Glasgow	1–3			

=== Edinburgh FA Cup ===
Date	Round	Opponent	Venue	Result	Attendance	Scorers	Ref
22 September 1877	R1	Hanover	East Meadows	1–0			
12 January 1878	R2	Thistle	Mayfield Park, Newington	4–0			
9 February 1878	F	Hearts	Mayfield Park, Newington	0–0			
16 February 1878	F	Hearts	Mayfield Park, Newington	1–1			
23 February 1878	F	Hearts	Mayfield Park, Newington	1–1			
6 April 1878	F	Hearts	Bainfield Park, Merchiston	1–1			
20 April 1878	F	Hearts	Powburn, Newington	2–3			

=== Friendly matches ===
Date	Opponent	Venue	Result	Attendance	Scorers	Ref
13 October 1877	Thistle	East Meadows	1–0			
17 November 1877	Arthurlie	Barrhead	0–2			
9 March 1878	Edinburgh Swifts	Mayfield Park, Newington	3–0			

== See also ==
- List of Hibernian F.C. seasons
