= Western F.C. =

Association football club in Glasgow City, Scotland

Western
- Full name: Western Football Club
- Founded: 1873
- Dissolved: 1878
- Ground: Regent's Park
Home colours

Western Football Club was a 19th-century football club based in Partick, in Glasgow.

== History ==
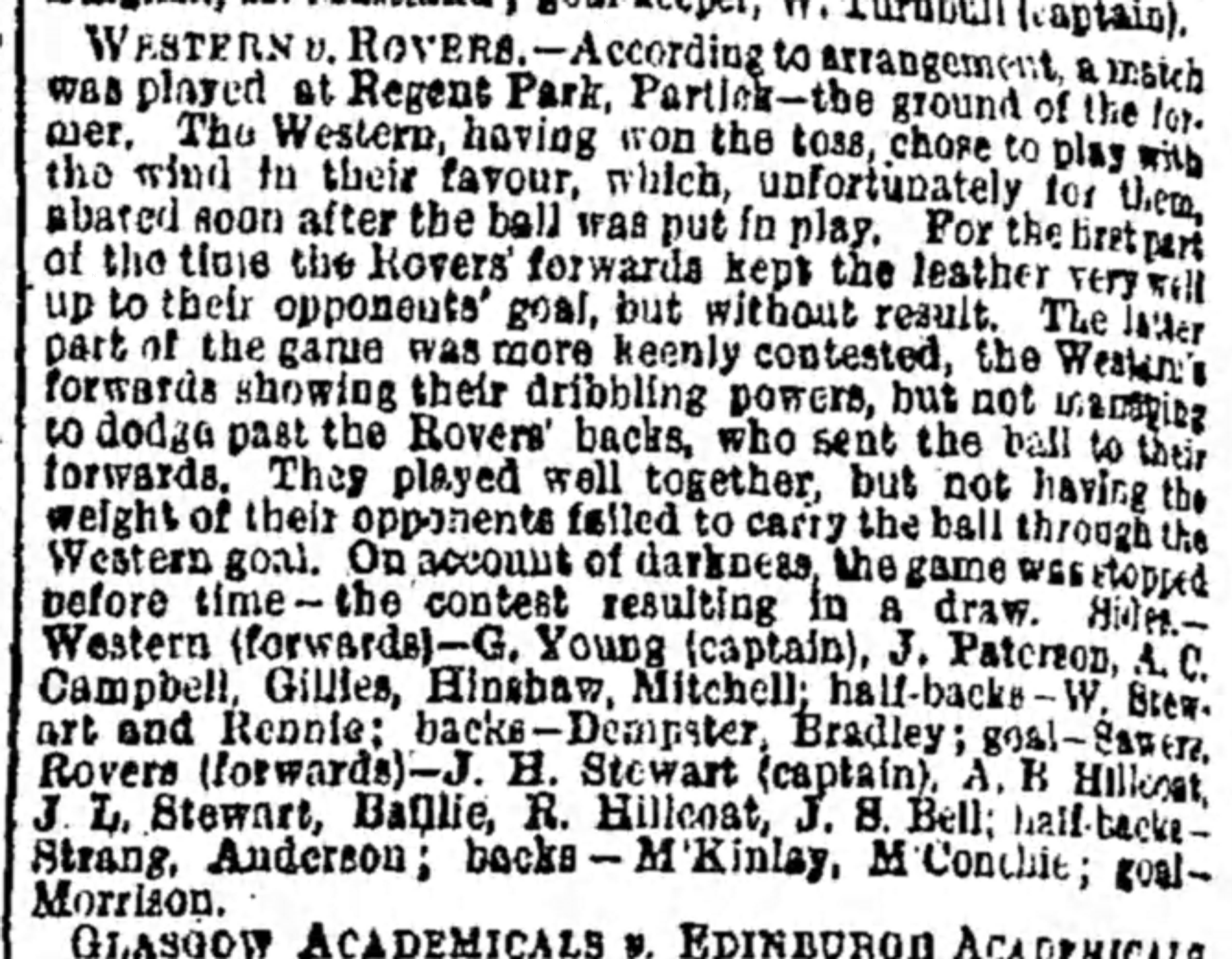
Match report for Western v Rovers, Glasgow Herald, 25 November 1873

The club was formed out of a cricket club and was one of the original 16 teams to participate in the inaugural season of the Scottish Cup. It seems to have had some wealthy benefactors, as the club contributed £4 to the cost of the Cup, £1 more than the well-backed Alexandra Athletic F.C. and only behind Queen's Park and Clydesdale, both of whom had large memberships.

The club was also active in the administration of the game, the club's R. M. Liddell acting as the Scottish Football Association treasurer in its early days.

In the first round of the first competition, in the 1873–74 season, the club lost 1–0 to eventual semi-finalists Blythswood. The club took notice of the defeat and recruited a number of the Blythswood players for 1874–75. The club also experimented with rugby union, playing out a goalless draw with Southern, an association club which had abandoned the round ball game for the oval in toto, in late 1873.

The only ties the club won came in 1875–76, beating the Caledonian club (of Kelvinbridge), Sandyford, and Helensburgh, to reach the quarter-finals, which, that year, was the final seven. The club faced the 3rd Lanark Rifle Volunteers, and, although Western had been good enough to draw with the Volunteers in 1874, the Cup tie was an easy win for the Volunteers. This was put down in part to the Western club losing several first team players for the tie, despite its high profile, and having to rely on several reserves, who had "an almost total lack of knowledge of the passing game".

The following season, rather than face Govan F.C., the club withdrew from the competition, suggesting that the club was struggling in the face of so many other clubs emerging. In 1877, the club faced a claim of £465 10/ in breach of contract, for the building of a club house on the cricket pitch, and that seems to have hastened the end of the club (both cricket and football), as no more is heard of either, and the club was definitely dissolved by 1878.

== Colours ==
The club's colours were black and white stripes, which in the context of the time referred to hoops.

== Grounds ==
The club originally played at Regent's Park in Partick, before moving in 1874 to the Caledonian cricket ground at Holyrood Park, reckoned to be the best in Glasgow.
