= 1st Lanarkshire Rifle Volunteers A.C. =

Association football club in Glasgow City, Scotland

1st L.R.V.
- Full name: 1st Lanarkshire Rifle Volunteers Athletic Club
- Nickname(s): the Greys, the Warriors
- Founded: 1874
- Dissolved: 1882 (for association football)
- Ground: Burnbank, Great Western Road
- Secretary: R. H. Sinclair
Home colours

The 1st Lanarkshire Rifle Volunteers Athletic Club was a 19th-century association football club based in Glasgow.

== History ==
The club was formed out of the 1st Lanarkshire Rifle Volunteers, a company in the Volunteer movement of the British Army. The Volunteers included sporting activities within their purview and newspapers often carried reports of such activities. The growth of football in Scotland, especially thanks to Queen's Park, and the success of army teams in England such as the Royal Engineers, encouraged regiments to form football clubs as part of the physical regimen.

The 1st LRV was the second Volunteer club in Glasgow to form, after the 3rd Lanarkshire club. On formation the club joined the Football Association as well as the Scottish Football Association.

The club entered the Scottish Cup for the first time in 1875–76. The club was drawn at home to Rangers, already one of the most established clubs in Scotland, and lost by 7 goals to nil.

The club entered the competition seven times in total, scratching once and losing in the first round five times. The club's only wins came in the 1877–78 Scottish Cup, when victories at home to Blythswood (by 1–0, having "pressed their opponents during the whole game") and Telegraphists put the club into the third round, made up of 34 clubs. Playing away at Copeland Park, the club went down 4–0 to South Western in a "very fast and pleasant" game.

The following season the club drew 0–0 with Parkgrove at Burnbank in the first round, but was largely outclassed all match, only Connel in goal keeping the club in the match; two of the players in the match (Bews and Dewar) were among the four players known to have played in the Rangers match three years before. Parkgrove however won the replay 6–2.

It is not clear when the club last played; its last Senior match was a defeat in the Scottish Cup to Northern in the first round in 1882–83. The only reported football matches for the club after 1882 are under rugby union rules.

== Colours ==
The club wore light blue and grey, with the regimental badge, matching the regimental colours.

== Grounds ==
The club played at Burnbank, on the Great Western Road in Glasgow.
