= 1886–87 Rangers F.C. season =

Rangers
1886–87 season
- President: James Watson
- Match Secretary: James Gossland
- Ground: Kinning Park
- Scottish Cup: Second round
- FA Cup: Semi-finals

The 1886–87 season was the 13th season of competitive football by Rangers.

== Overview ==
Rangers played a total of 10 competitive matches during the 1886–87 season.

== Results ==
All results are written with Rangers' score first.

=== Scottish Cup ===
Date	Round	Opponent	Venue	Result	Attendance	Scorers
11 September 1886	R1	Govan Athletic	H	9–1	500	
2 October 1886	R2	Westbourne	H	5–2	600	
26 October 1886	R3	Cambuslang	H	5–2	4,000	

=== FA Cup ===
Date	Round	Opponent	Venue	Result	Attendance	Scorers
30 October 1886	R1	Everton	H	0–0		
20 November 1886	R2	Church	H	2–1		
4 December 1886	R3	Cowlairs	H	3–2		
15 January 1887	R4	Bye into R5				
29 January 1887	R5	Lincoln City	H	3–0		
19 February 1887	R6	Old Westminsters	H	5–1		
5 March 1887	SF	Aston Villa	A	1–3		

== See also ==
- 1886–87 in Scottish football
- 1886–87 Scottish Cup
