= Telegraphists F.C. =

Former association football club in Scotland

Telegraphists
- Full name: Telegraphists Football Club
- Founded: 1874
- Dissolved: 1886
- Ground: Woodville Park
- Secretary: John McFadyen, Peter Mackie
Home colours

Telegraphists Football Club was a 19th-century association football club based at Govan, now in Glasgow.

== History ==
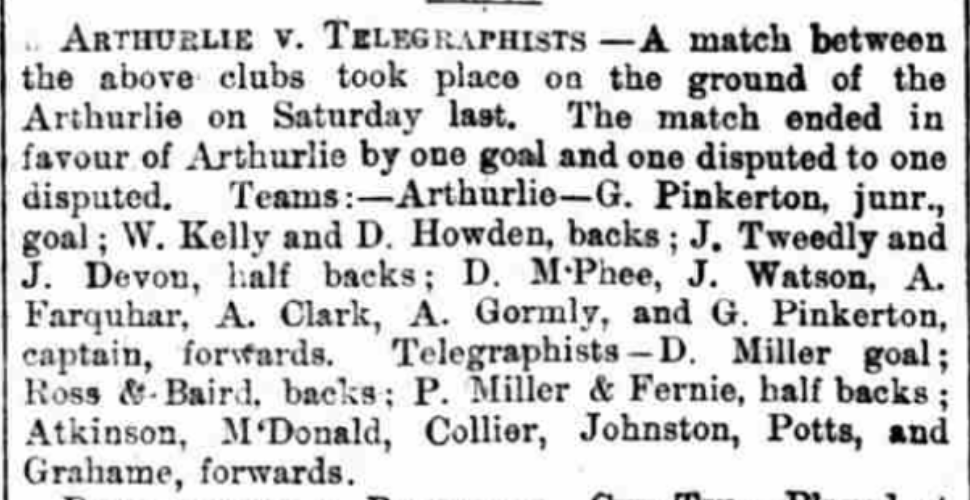
Friendly between Arthurlie and Telegraphists, Renfrewshire Independent, 30 October 1875

The club was founded in 1874 for workers at the Telegraph Department of the Glasgow General Post Office, as a winter activity for cricket club members; the Telegraphists cricket club used the same venue for its home matches, and cricket captain Atkinson was one of the club's forwards. In 1876 and 1877 the club had 43 members. The media occasionally referred to the club as Telegraphers but its title as reported to the Scottish Football Association was Telegraphists.

The club entered the Scottish Cup for the first time in 1875–76, losing 3–0 to the St Andrew's (Glasgow) club on Glasgow Green; all three goals came between the 46th and 60th minutes, as St Andrew's had a strong wind behind them after the break, although the Telegraphists' back play received particular praise.

In 1876–77 the club was hammered 12–0 at Northern, five of the goals falling to Cunningham. In 1877–78, the club gained its only win (and scored its only goal) in the competition, beating the 4th Renfrewshire Rifle Volunteers 1–0 in the first round, but losing 4–0 against the 1st Lanarkshire equivalents in the second.

The club's 10–0 defeat at Whitefield in 1878–79 was the club's last Cup tie. Although it entered the 1879–80 competition, it withdrew rather than play Possil Bluebell.

After 1880 the club's activities almost cease, the most notable matches being against telegraphist offices in other towns. The last reference to a match played by the club is a 3–3 draw against Burnbank Swifts F.C. in June 1886. The club may not have continued after this, given the difficulties with its home ground.

== Colours ==
The club's colours were given as white and black (or black and white), probably in hoops, which was the dominant design at the time.

== Ground ==
The club played at Woodville Park in Govan. Towards the end of the 1885–86 season, the ground owner sued the club's committee for the £5 quarterly rent, which the club defended on the basis that constant flooding kept causing the postponement of matches. The committee was ordered to pay half of the rent claimed (£2 10s).
