= 1885–86 Rangers F.C. season =

Rangers
1885–86 season
- President: James Watson
- Match Secretary: James Gossland
- Ground: Kinning Park
- Scottish Cup: First round
- FA Cup: First round

The 1885–86 season was the 12th season of competitive football by Rangers.

== Overview ==
Rangers played a total of 2 competitive matches during the 1885–86 season.

== Results ==
All results are written with Rangers' score first.

=== Scottish Cup ===
Date	Round	Opponent	Venue	Result	Attendance	Scorers
12 September 1885	R1	Clyde	A	0–1	1,500	

=== FA Cup ===
Date	Round	Opponent	Venue	Result	Attendance	Scorers
31 October 1885	R1	Rawtenstall	A	w/o		

== Appearances ==
Player	Position	Appearances	Goals
(Scotland) David Mitchell	MF	20	0
(Scotland) Neil Kerr	MF	20	8
(Scotland) John McPherson	FW	20	15
(Scotland) David Hislop	FW	20	10
(Scotland) David Reid	GK	18	0
(Scotland) Donald Gow	DF	18	1
(Scotland) Robert Marshall	MF	18	2
(Scotland) Andrew McCreadie	DF	17	2
(Scotland) Hugh McCreadie	FW	16	6
(Scotland) James Henderson	FW	14	6
(Scotland) William Hodge	DF	10	0
(Scotland) James McIntyre	DF	9	0
(Scotland) John Muir	DF	9	0
(Scotland) Thomas Wyllie	MF	5	0
(Scotland) Archibald McKenzie	GK	3	3
(Scotland) John White	MF	2	0
(Scotland) William Wilson	MF	1	0

== See also ==
- 1885–86 in Scottish football
- 1885–86 Scottish Cup
