= Alex McGeoch =

Scottish footballer (1854-1922)

Alex McGeoch OBE
Personal information
- Birth name: Alexander McGeoch
- Date of birth: 10 March 1854
- Place of birth: Partick, Scotland
- Date of death: 24 January 1922 (aged 67)
- Place of death: Birmingham, England
- Position: Goalkeeper

Senior career*
Years	Team	Apps	(Gls)
- Glasgow Western
- Dumbreck

International career
1876–1877	Scotland	4	(0)
- * Club domestic league appearances and goals

Alexander McGeoch (10 March 1854 – 24 January 1922) was a Scottish footballer who played for Glasgow Western, Dumbreck and Scotland. A goalkeeper, he was the only serving Dumbreck player to have been selected for international duty. McGeoch also played cricket and rugby union (representing the West of Scotland club in both sports); in his professional life he was a company director at a brass hardware firm in England, and in 1920 was awarded an OBE for services relating to work in relation to the First World War.
