= James Duncan (football left-back) =

Scottish footballer

Personal information
- Position: Left back

Senior career*
Years	Team	Apps	(Gls)
- Eastern
- Alexandra Athletic
1882–1884	Rangers		

International career
1878–1882	Scotland	2	(0)
- * Club domestic league appearances and goals

James Duncan was a Scottish footballer, who played for Eastern, Alexandra Athletic, Rangers and Scotland. After retiring as a player, Duncan served on the Rangers management committee.
