= Whiteinch F.C. =

Former association football club in Scotland

Whiteinch Football Club
- Full name: Whiteinch
- Founded: 1874
- Dissolved: 1879
- Ground: Westburn Park
- Secretary: John Gardner
Home colours

Whiteinch Football Club was a football club based in the burgh of Whiteinch (now part of the city of Glasgow), Scotland.

== History ==
The club was formed in 1874. It was not a large or prestigious side; by 1877, its closest rival, Partick, had over twice the membership, and one of the earliest Whiteinch matches recorded is the Whiteinch first XI taking on the Partick second XI in the 1875–76 season.

Whiteinch entered the Scottish Cup on three occasions. Whiteinch was particularly unlucky in its competition debut in 1877–78, being drawn to play at the dominant Queen's Park. The Q.P. duly won 9–0, seven of the goals coming in the second half.

The club was a little more successful in the 1878–79 Scottish Cup, reaching the second round after two draws with Pollokshields Athletic, both matches ending 3–3. The rules of the competition at the time allowed both teams to proceed in the event of two draws. In the second round, Whiteinch lost 3–1 at home to fellow Glaswegians Derby.

In the 1879–80 Scottish Cup, Whiteinch was drawn at home to South-Western, but did not arrange the tie before the due date, thus scratching from the competition. The club seems to have disbanded before the season started as there are no matches recorded for the club.

== Colours ==
The club played originally played in navy and white 1 inch hooped shirts, white knickerbockers, and red stockings. After 1877 the club wore navy shirts with a 1-inch hoop around the left arm, the design being a form of canting on the name White-inch.

== Ground ==
The club had a private ground at Westburn Park.
