= David Wotherspoon =

David Wotherspoon may refer to:

- David Wotherspoon (footballer, born 1849) (1849–1906), Scotland international who played for Queen's Park and Clydesdale
- David Wotherspoon (footballer, born 1990), for Hibernian and St Johnstone
