= Kinning Park (sports ground) =

Former football stadium in Glasgow, Scotland

Coordinates: 55°50′59″N 4°17′04″W

Kinning Park was a 19th-century sports ground in Kinning Park, Renfrewshire, Scotland, (Note: Located in the Renfrewshire portion of Govan parish when the ground existed, Kinning Park is now an area of Glasgow, having been incorporated into the city in 1905.) primarily used for cricket and football. It was the home of Clydesdale Cricket Club from 1849, staging a number of important matches against visiting English teams. It was also the original home of the club's football team, Clydesdale F.C. When both teams relocated to Titwood in 1876, Kinning Park was taken over by Rangers F.C., who played there until moving to the first Ibrox Park in 1887. The ground was the venue for the 1881 Scottish Cup Final (and replay) between Queen's Park and Dumbarton.

== History ==
=== Cricket ===
Clydesdale Cricket Club were founded in 1848 by the merger of the Thistle and Wallace-grove clubs. They originally played at Kinning Park on a field rented from a Mr Tweedie, a "cow feeder", close to the present site of Shields Road subway station, which had previously been used by Wallace-grove. They played their first home game on 16 September 1848 against Greenock, but after one more game were asked to leave by Mr Tweedie due to the damage to his grass. For the 1849 season, Clydesdale moved to a new ground about 500 yards to the west on the corner of Lambhill Street and West Scotland Street, rented from a Mr Meiklewham. The first match there was on 30 June 1849 against Barrhead.

From 1851 onwards, Kinning Park hosted a number of prestigious "international" matches against visiting select teams. The first, on 18–20 September 1851, is recorded by CricketArchive as being between Glasgow and an All England Eleven, although some contemporary newspapers billed "the great cricket match in Glasgow" as being "Scotland versus England"; the Glasgow Herald previewed the fixture by describing it as "an interesting match, which is exciting such an intense curiosity all over Scotland". The twenty-two-man Glasgow team, which was effectively a Clydesdale side augmented by guest English professionals, gained a draw against an All England team that included Alfred Mynn, Fuller Pilch and John Wisden. Kinning Park continued to host similar prestigious matches, pitting teams variously billed as Clydesdale, Glasgow or Scotland against an All England Eleven or United England Eleven until 1864, while there were also matches against a United Ireland Eleven in 1860 and the United South of England Eleven in 1866. (Note: None of the matches played at Kinning Park are categorised as first-class or equivalent as they were "odds matches", with the local team permitted additional players to make for a better contest against the relative strength of the visiting sides.)

In the early 1860s, Kinning Park was still the rural locality it had been when Clydesdale arrived. At this time, there were two more cricket fields to the east of the Clydesdale ground, used by minor local clubs including Alma, St Clair and Russley, while nearby to the north was an archery ground. By the following decade the area had transformed into a rapidly growing industrial suburb, to the extent that it gained independent burgh status in 1871. With increasing demand for land development, Clydesdale were informed in 1874 by landowner Sir William Stirling-Maxwell of the Pollok Estate that they would have to vacate the ground to make way for the Caledonian Railway's Kinning Park Goods Yard, with a choice of alternative grounds elsewhere on the estate. The final cricket match at Kinning Park was in September 1875, when Clydesdale members played the last of their annual "North v South" (of the River Clyde) matches. For the 1876 season, they relocated to their new ground at Titwood in nearby Pollokshields.

=== Football ===
Clydesdale F.C. was formed around 1872 as an offshoot of the cricket club, and were one of the founder members of the Scottish Football Association (SFA) in 1873. They reached the final of the inaugural Scottish Cup in 1873-74, with Kinning Park staging its first Cup tie in the competition's first round, Clydesdale beating Granville 6–0.

Although the cricket field was lost to the railway development in 1875, enough land remained for football to continue at Kinning Park, although Clydesdale would play only one further season there in 1875–76 before joining the cricket club at Titwood. In April 1876, Clydesdale defeated The Wednesday of Sheffield 2–0 in a prestige friendly match that attracted a large crowd, with around one thousand spectators accommodated in a grandstand on the north side of the ground and six thousand more standing. With many more trying to view the game from outside the ground, a shed roof behind the west goal with two hundred people atop it collapsed, although there were no serious injuries.

Two weeks prior to the Wednesday match, Clydesdale had hosted Rangers at Kinning Park, and it was they who became the ground's new tenants later that year. After playing initially on Glasgow Green, the up-and-coming club then spent the 1875–76 season renting their first enclosed ground at Burnbank in the West End of Glasgow, but the location proved unpopular with their growing band of supporters. The move to Kinning Park saw Rangers first begin to establish themselves in the south-western fringe of Glasgow where they would make their permanent home. They officially opened their new ground on 2 September 1876 with a 2–1 victory over one of the leading clubs of the era, Vale of Leven.

Kinning Park was selected by the SFA as the neutral venue for the 1881 Scottish Cup Final between Queen's Park and Dumbarton. The match was played on 26 March 1881, with Queen's Park winning 2–1 in front of a "vast crowd" estimated at up to twenty thousand people, then "the largest that has ever been seen at a football match". Dumbarton lodged a protest that this had led to spectators encroaching on the field and interfering with play. This was upheld by the SFA, who ordered that the match should be replayed. With Kinning Park again chosen to host the replay, measures were taken to improve the spectator accommodation, with two temporary stands and new barriers being erected, while Rangers sought to prevent people climbing onto their clubhouse roof — as at the first game — by having it freshly tarred. On this occasion, the gates were locked with approximately ten thousand people inside, while perhaps half as many again watched from outside, including from trucks on the adjacent railway and from the windows of surrounding buildings. Queen's Park won again, this time 3–1.

Rangers continued to play at Kinning Park for the next six years, suffering their all-time record defeat there on 6 February 1886, losing 10–2 to Airdrieonians in a friendly match. The club eventually decided to leave due to the limitations of the cramped site and their inability to expand its capacity. During their final season at the ground they reached the semi-finals of the FA Cup, (Note: 1886–87 was the last season in which Scottish clubs were able to enter the (English) FA Cup, as they were subsequently barred from doing so by the SFA.) with the last competitive game at Kinning Park being their 5–1 quarter-final win over Old Westminsters on 19 February 1887, watched by between five and six thousand spectators. The last match of all took place one week later, with a match between the "Moderns" and the "Ancients" — current members against players from the club's early days. For the following season, Rangers moved further out from the city, to the Ibrox area of Govan, where they opened the first Ibrox Park.

=== Athletics ===
The first Rangers Sports, the football club's annual athletics meeting, took place at Kinning Park on 20 August 1881. Clydesdale Harriers, Scotland's first open amateur athletics club, were formed in 1885 and initially used the ground for training and events, as they had a significant membership overlap with Rangers; they would later follow them to Ibrox.

A sawmill was built over the site of the ground, followed by a school (Lambhill Primary), and it is now covered by the eastbound carriageway of the M8 motorway.
