= Callander F.C. =

Former association football club in Scotland

Callander
- Full name: Callander Football Club
- Founded: 1872
- Dissolved: 1874
- Ground: Haughs, Glasgow Green
- Captain: Archibald McLaren
- Secretary: William McFarlane
Home colours

Callander Football Club was a short-lived 19th-century football club from Glasgow.

== History ==
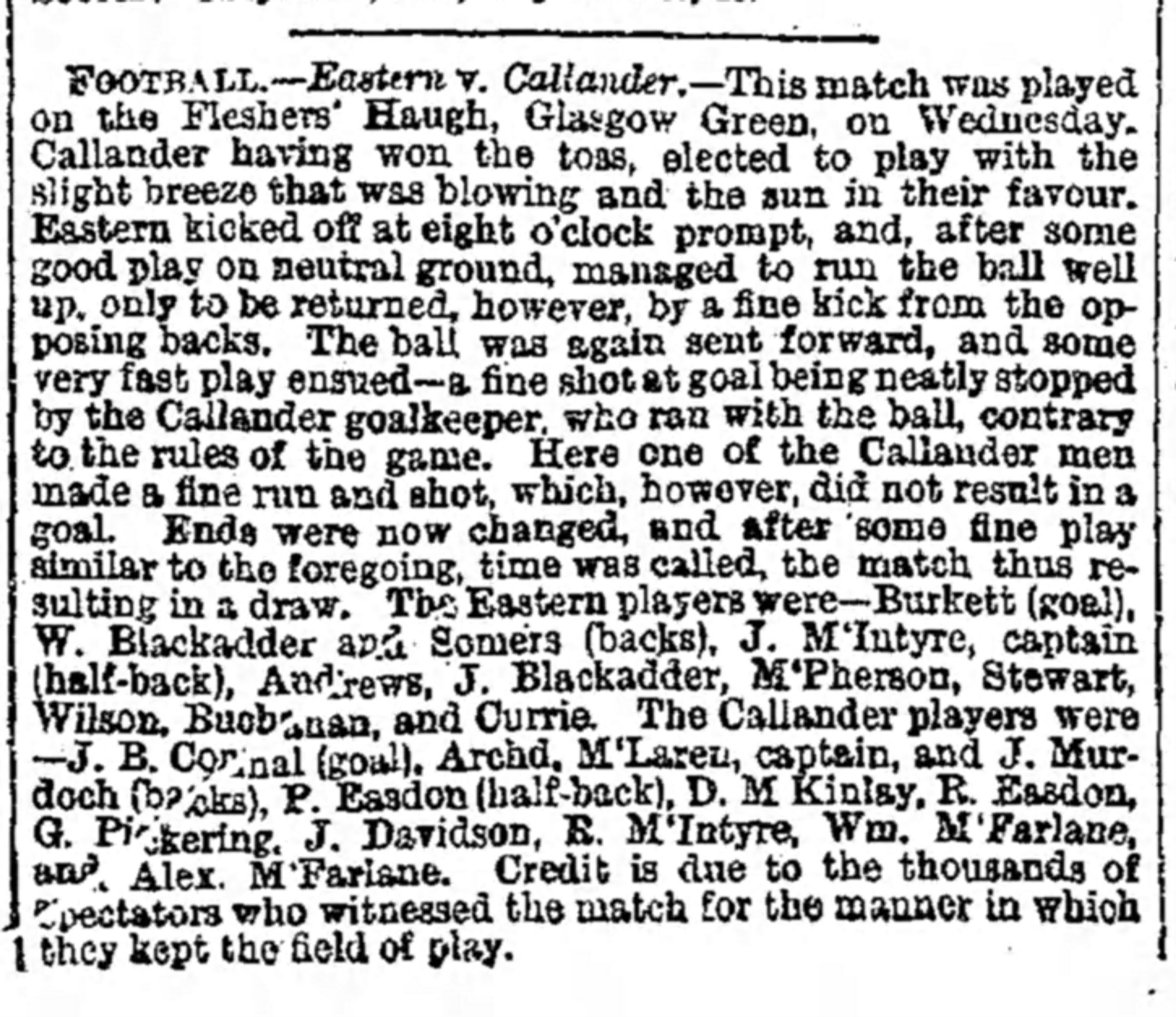
Match report for Callander v Eastern, Glasgow Herald, 20 June 1873

The club was formed in 1872, out of members of the defunct original Thistle F.C., and named after the Perthshire village which was the origin of many of its members.

In its first half-season, the club claimed to have played three matches, all of which were 0–0 draws. One of those draws, at Fleshers' Haugh on Glasgow Green in May 1872, was the first match for Rangers F.C.

The club was one of the original 16 teams to participate in the inaugural season of the Scottish Cup. It lost in the first round of the 1873–74 Scottish Cup, 2–0 to Alexandra Athletic; the Glasgow Herald stated that the Callander side "manoeuvred at times very badly". One issue is that its membership overlapped with that of the bigger Eastern club (which also played at the Haughs) and some of its better players, including back W. Somers and forward Peter Andrews, had thrown their lot in with Eastern for the tournament. Callander also changed its line-up from 2–1–7 to 2–2–6, so the players may not have been as familiar with each other and their roles as the Athletes were.

The club seems to have wound up shortly afterwards as there is no record of it playing again; it was in effect absorbed into Eastern, as players such as goalkeeper G. Pickering, backs J. B. Connell, Somers, and W. M'Farlane, and forwards J. Davidson, J. Blackadder, and Andrews, are found in Eastern line-ups in 1874.

== Colours ==
The club colours were blue caps, white jerseys, and blue knickerbockers.

== Ground ==
The club played at the Haughs, on Glasgow Green, one and a half miles from the Royal Exchange.

== Notable players ==
- Peter Andrews, the only Callander player to go on to win an international cap, playing against England in 1875.
