= Derby F.C. (Glasgow) =

Former association football club in Scotland

Derby
- Full name: Derby Cricket and Football Club
- Founded: 1876
- Dissolved: 1879
- Ground: Craigbank Park
- Secretary: Robert Fraser, Charles M'Fie
Home colours

Derby Football Club was a 19th-century football club based in Glasgow.

== History ==
Although an earlier Derby club (playing at Belmont Park) had been active in 1873, this club was founded in 1876 out of the Shawfield Cricket Club, and played its first season under the name Shawfield. Despite being one of the smaller clubs in Glasgow, with only 25 members in its first season, its resulting record was: 9 wins, 9 draws and 2 defeats.

Shawfield entered the Scottish Cup for the first time in 1877–78; the club was drawn to face Dumbreck in the first round, but the latter scratched. In September 1877 the club changed its name to the Derby Cricket and Football Club. Its first match in the competition therefore was under its new name, an away 11–0 defeat to 3rd Lanarkshire Rifle Volunteers.

The following season, the club drew twice against the Glaswegian club Oxford, which under the competition rules at the time meant both clubs progressed into the second round. In the second Derby beat Whiteinch 3–1, but in the third was drawn to visit Govan, who had beaten Oxford in the second round, and the Govanites duly beat Derby 4–0.

Derby had regular fixtures until the end of 1878, but no football fixtures are mentioned from 1879 onwards; only one cricket fixture is reported and the club gained more attention for being a victim of theft, when equipment was lifted from the pavilion. The club did enter the Scottish Cup for 1879–80, and was drawn to play the John Elder works side, but John Elder took a walkover.

== Colours ==
The club's colours were red and black striped jerseys and hose, which in the 1870s referred to hoops, with white knickerbockers.

== Ground ==
The club played at a private ground at Craigbank Park, near Springburn.
