= Burnbank Park =

Sports field in Glasgow, Scotland

- Location within Glasgow council area
- Location: Glasgow, Scotland
- Coordinates: 55.872354°N 4.275547°W
- Owner: 1st Lanarkshire Rifle Volunteers
- Surface: Grass

Tenants
- 1st Lanarkshire Rifle Volunteers F.C. 1st Lanarkshire Rifle Volunteers RFC; Caledonian Cricket Club; Glasgow Academicals RFC; Rangers F.C. Caledonian F.C.

Burnbank Park was a sports ground in Glasgow, Scotland. It was situated in the city's Woodlands area, found at Barrington Drive (between Great Western Road and Woodlands Road). No trace of the ground remains, having been built on by sandstone tenement housing in the late 19th century, which survives into the 21st century. The name endures locally with the Burnbank Bowling Club a few blocks to the south, founded in 1866, around the same time the sports grounds were coming into use for team sports.

== History ==
Burnbank Park was originally owned by the 1st Lanarkshire Rifle Volunteers, who used the area for practising their drills. The regiment leased out the ground for use by various sports clubs.

The venue was used for the first rugby union provincial representative match in the world; the 'Inter-City' match between Glasgow District and Edinburgh District on 23 November 1872. The current professional district teams Glasgow Warriors and Edinburgh Rugby play for the 1872 Cup to celebrate their first derby match.

The ground was also used as a venue for cricket matches an All-England eleven took on Scottish club sides there.

=== 1st Lanarkshire Rifle Volunteers F.C. ===
The 1st Lanarkshire Rifle Volunteers had their own short-lived football club which was extant from 1874 to 1883.

=== 1st Lanarkshire Rifle Volunteers RFC ===
The 1st Lanarkshire Rifle Volunteers also had a rugby union club. One of its players W. A. McDonald played for Glasgow District in the 1884 inter-city match against Edinburgh District.

=== Caledonian Cricket Club ===
The Caledonian Cricket Club was founded c.1850 and used this ground for their matches, together with another ground in Kelvinbridge (where Glasgow Academy is now situated – the school took over the Kelvinbridge site in 1878).

=== Glasgow Academicals RFC ===
Glasgow Academicals rugby club leased the ground from 1866 to 1872.

=== Rangers F.C. ===
The ground was leased to Rangers for one season (1875–76). Rangers' first match there was on 11 September 1875 against Vale of Leven; their last was on 18 March 1876 against Clydesdale. At the end of that season, Clydesdale vacated their ground at Kinning Park on the south-west side of Glasgow (though technically outside the city boundary at the time) and Rangers took over that site, beginning their enduring association with that part of town.

=== Caledonian F.C. ===
An off-shoot of the Caledonian Cricket Club was the Caledonian Football Club, who also leased Burnbank.
