= Whitehill F.C. =

Association football club in Glasgow City, Scotland

Whitehill
- Full name: Whitehill Football Club
- Founded: 1882
- Dissolved: 1886
- Ground: Haghill Park
- Match Secretary: George Gilmour
Whitehill colours	Dennistoun Athletic colours

Whitehill Football Club was a Scottish association football club based in Dennistoun, in Glasgow.

== History ==
The club was founded in 1882 by the Stewart brothers, former pupils of Glasgow High School, with its first reported match coming at the start of 1883 against a Partick reserve side.

Whitehill entered the Scottish Cup for the first time in 1883–84. In the first round, the club beat neighbours Alexandra Athletic 3–1, Whitehill's two second-half goals coming against the wind. The Whitehill side lined up as:

J. Strathearn, R. Stewart, J. Clark, J. Goodall, A. Macrae, A. Stewart, J. M'Menemy, P. White, J. Rankin, R. Gill, J. Cummings

In the second round, the club was drawn to play Rangers away. Rangers had the disadvantage of losing goalkeeper Chalmers after 15 minutes through a hand injury; however, and despite Whitehill's "young players show[ing] good play at times", the home side won by 14 goals to 2, with two further goals disputed. This remains Rangers' (joint) highest score.

The following season the club had the misfortune to be drawn against Rangers again in the first round, losing this time 11–0.

In 1885, the club changed its name to Dennistoun Athletic. It entered the Scottish Cup one last time in 1885–86 but lost 3–1 at Whitefield.

The club's lack of success on the national stage was mirrored in more local football. It entered the Glasgow North-Eastern Cup from 1882–83 to 1885–86 but lost in the first round each time, the final match being an 8–0 defeat at Clyde in 1886. The last recorded game for the club is a 5–4 defeat at Port Glasgow Athletic in May 1886 and the club was struck from the Scottish Football Association register before the 1886–87 season.

== Colours ==
The club originally wore all white, the inspiration possibly coming from the club name. With its change of name, the club changed its colours to black and white one-inch hoops and blue knickers.

== Ground ==
The club originally played at Onslow Park, two minutes' walk from the Dennistoun car stop, taken over from the recently defunct Harmonic Good Templars.

By the 1883–84 season the club had moved to Craigpark's former ground at Haghill Park and, as Dennistoun Athletic, played at Kennyhill Park, 10 minutes' from the tram terminus, and the former home of Alexandra Athletic.
