= 1883–84 Rangers F.C. season =

Rangers
1883–84 season
- President: James Watson
- Match Secretary: John Wallace MacKay
- Ground: Kinning Park
- Scottish Cup: Semi-finals
Home colours

The 1883–84 season was the tenth season of competitive football by Rangers.

== Overview ==
Rangers played a total of 7 competitive matches during the 1883–84 season.

== Results ==
All results are written with Rangers' score first.

=== Scottish Cup ===
Date	Round	Opponent	Venue	Result	Attendance	Scorers
8 September 1883	R1	Northern	A	1–0		
29 September 1883	R2	Whitehill	H	14–2		
20 October 1883	R3	Falkirk	H	5–2	2,000	
10 November 1883	R4	Dunblane	A	1–6		
1 December 1883	R5	St Bernard's	A	3–0	2,000	
22 December 1883	R6	Cambuslang	A	1–5		
19 January 1884	SF	Vale of Leven	A	0–3	7,000	

== See also ==
- 1883–84 in Scottish football
- 1883–84 Scottish Cup
