= Govan F.C. =

Association football club in Glasgow City, Scotland

Govan
- Full name: Govan Football Club
- Founded: 1873
- Dissolved: 1881
- Ground: Moore Park
- Secretary: D. M. Bethune
Home colours

Govan Football Club was a Scottish association football club based in Govan, now part of Glasgow.

== History ==
The club was founded in 1873, although the first of the club's fixtures to be published were in the 1874–75 season.

The club first entered the Scottish Cup in 1876–77. The club had a walkover in the first round after Western withdrew but lost to West End of Glasgow in the second round. The result was reported as both a 1–1 draw and a 1–0 win for West End, because of a disputed Govan goal; Govan issued a protest to the Scottish Football Association, which was dismissed. This was the club's only defeat in the season, finishing with 19 wins in 22 games, although it had not played any of the leading Glasgow clubs.

Govan reached the fourth round of the competition in both 1877–78 and 1878–79, both times being one of the last 18 clubs in the competition. In 1877–78, the club's fourth round opponent, the 3rd Lanark Rifle Volunteers, was by far the hardest opponent the club had faced, and the Volunteers won 7–0. The following season followed a similar pattern; after three easy matches, the club was drawn to face the holders Vale of Leven, and lost 11–1, Gray scoring Govan's only goal when seven goals down.

The club was still active in the 1880–81 season, even playing a friendly at Middlesbrough, but it struggled to raise a team. The last recorded match for the club was a 2–1 defeat at Abercorn at the end of the 1880–81 season. Govan's last entry to the Scottish Cup was for 1881–82, but the club withdrew when drawn to face Harmonic F.C. of Dennistoun, and no more is heard of the club.

== Colours ==
The club's colours were 1 inch red and white hoops.

== Ground ==
The club originally played at Fairfield Park. In 1877 the club moved to a private ground, Moore Park, on Broomloan Road.
