= William Gibb (footballer) =

Scottish footballer

Personal information
- Positions: Half-back; forward

Senior career*
Years	Team	Apps	(Gls)
- Clydesdale
- Queen's Park

International career
1873	Scotland	1	(1)
- * Club domestic league appearances and goals

William Gibb was a Scottish footballer who played as a half-back and forward.

== Career ==
Gibb played club football for Clydesdale and Queen's Park, and scored on his only appearance for Scotland in 1873.
