= Eastern F.C. =

Former association football club in Glasgow City, Scotland

Eastern
- Full name: Eastern Football Club
- Founded: 1872
- Dissolved: 1877
- Ground: Barrowfield Park
- Secretary: George Forrest
Home colours

Eastern Football Club was a 19th-century football club based in Glasgow, Scotland. It was one of the founder members of the Scottish Football Association (SFA) and one of the sixteen teams to participate in the inaugural season of the Scottish Cup.

== History ==
Eastern was formed in 1872 by members of the original Thistle club. The club's first game, at Fleshers' Haughs, took place on 25 January 1873, against a Celtic football club, and ended in a 4–0 win to Eastern, although the Celtic goalkeeper claimed the score was merely 3–0.

Eastern were one of the eight clubs that agreed to form the SFA in March that year. Eastern participated in Scottish Cup tournaments between 1873–74 and 1876–77, reaching the quarter-finals on the first two occasions; its run in 1874–75 included a 3–0 win over Kilmarnock, despite thoughts that the Eastern "hardly played with its usual fettle".

A member of Eastern, James McIntyre, was selected to referee the first Scottish Cup final between Queen's Park and Clydesdale on 21 March 1874. The same year the Eastern in effect took over the smaller Callander club, fielding a number of Callander players in matches from early in 1874.

The club's final Cup tie was against Alexandra Athletic in 1876. The clubs drew the first game, and Eastern won the second 2–0, but the Athletes protested on the basis that the referee who took charge of the match had not been agreed beforehand; ironically, this was down to Eastern objecting to the Alexandra nominee, but Eastern called the protest "a mean subterfuge to attempt to wrest the honours which have already been fairly won". Perhaps as a result of the Scottish FA acceding to the protest, and the Athletes winning the third match, Eastern does not seem to have played football again, with members instead forming the Clyde club, and possibly also joining the Stonefield club which, with Clyde, took over the Eastern ground.

== Colours ==
The club played in royal blue and scarlet shirts, originally with blue serge knickerbockers, which were white for the club's final season.

== Stadium ==
The club's first ground was Fleshers' Haugh on Glasgow Green. In 1875, the club moved to Barrowfield Park, which was also known informally as Glengarry Park, after the open space next to the roped-off area. It was immediately to the east of the Barrowfield print works and considered short at 130 yards.

== Notable players ==
During its relatively short time, Eastern provided Scotland with some of its early international players, with John Hunter, Peter Andrews and Sandy Kennedy representing Scotland on a number of occasions.
