= John McPherson (Clydesdale footballer) =

Scottish footballer

Personal information
- Position: Forward

Senior career*
Years	Team	Apps	(Gls)
- Clydesdale

International career
1875	Scotland	1	(0)
- * Club domestic league appearances and goals

John McPherson was a Scottish footballer who played as a forward.

== Career ==
McPherson played club football for Clydesdale. He scored the first hat-trick in the Scottish Cup during Clydesdale's 6–0 victory over Granville on 25 October 1873.

McPherson also made one appearance for Scotland in 1875.
