= James Gossland =

Scottish footballer

Personal information
- Date of birth: 6 September 1860
- Place of birth: Glasgow, Scotland
- Date of death: 1944 (aged 83–84)
- Place of death: East Transvaal, South Africa
- Position: Forward

Senior career*
Years	Team	Apps	(Gls)
- Dennistoun
18??–1882	Alexandra Athletic		
1882–1889	Rangers	15	(8)

International career
1884	Scotland	1	(2)
- * Club domestic league appearances and goals

James Gossland (born 6 September 1860 in Glasgow) was a Scottish footballer who played for Dennistoun, Alexandra Athletic, Rangers and the Scotland national team.

After spells at Dennistoun and Alexandra Athletic, the latter for whom he also served as general secretary, he joined Rangers in 1882. During his time at Rangers, he won his only cap for Scotland, and scored twice in a 5–0 win over Ireland on 26 January 1884. In 1885, he was appointed as Rangers' match secretary and continued to feature intermittently in the first team until 1889. He had the honour of being the first person to score in the British Home Championship.

Gossland died in East Transvaal, South Africa, around November 1944.
