= Granville F.C. =

Former association football club in Scotland

Granville
- Full name: Granville Football Club
- Founded: 1872
- Dissolved: 1874
- Ground: Myrtle Park
- Secretary: John C. Mackay
- Captain: R. C. Kinloch
Home colours

Granville Football Club was a short-lived 19th-century football club based at Myrtle Park, in Crosshill, Glasgow.

== History ==
The club was officially founded in 1872 as a football playing division of the Granville Cricket Club. However the club's first match had already taken place, with Queen's Park beating a Granville side 1–0 in November 1871; six Queen's Park men made up the numbers for Granville.

By 1873 the club had 80 members, which made it nearly as big as Queen's Park, and in April 1872 the club was the first Scottish side to avoid defeat to Queen's Park, with a 0–0 draw. Along with Queen's Park, Granville was one of the founder members of the Scottish Football Association. Club secretary John Mackay became the first secretary of the Scottish FA.

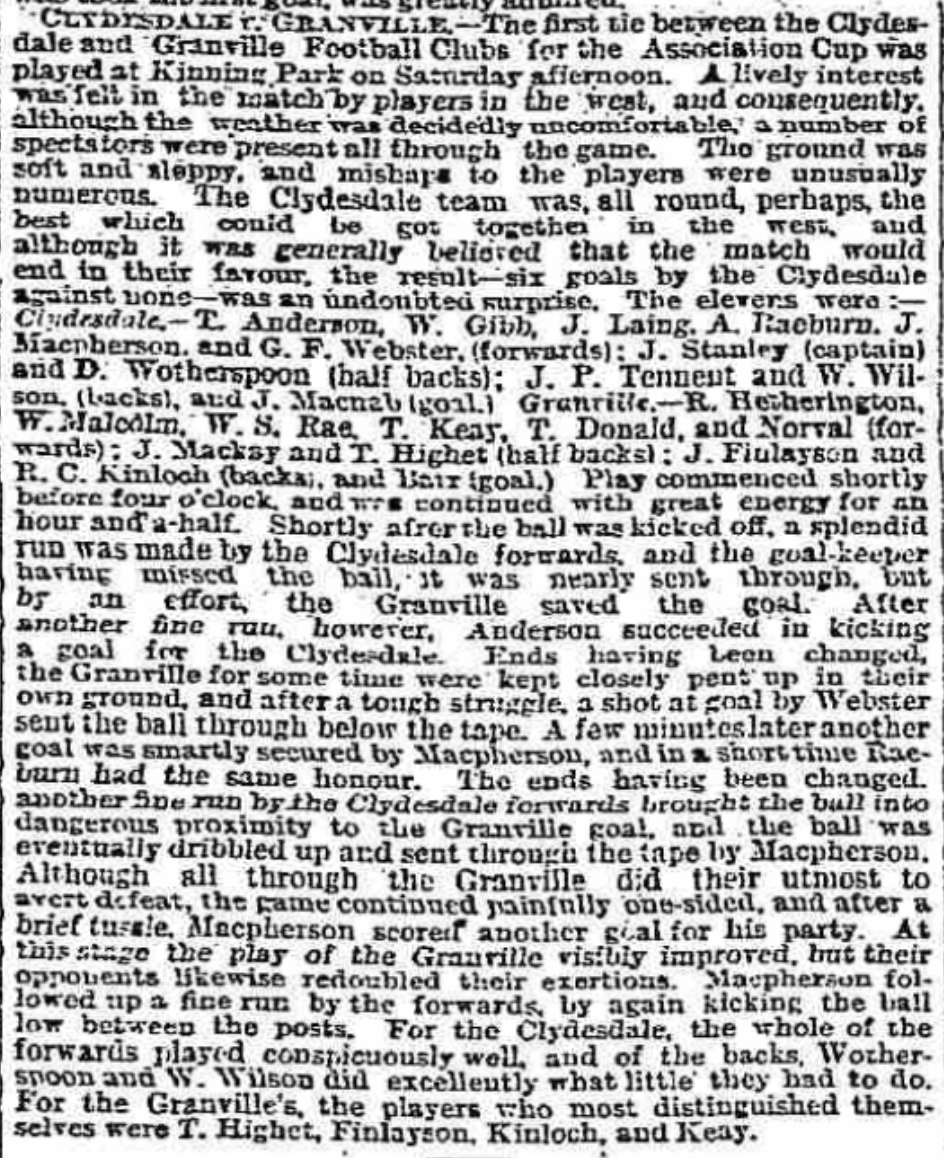
1873–74 Scottish Cup 1st Round, Clydesdale 6–0 Granville, North British Daily Mail, 27 October 1873

The club entered the first Scottish Cup in 1873–74 season. The club had an unlucky draw, away to the eventual finalists Clydesdale, and lost 6–0, being "completely overmatched by the splendid and powerful combined play of the younger club"; at 5–0 down the Granville swapped the "deficient" Barr out of goal for the forward Hetherington. That seemed to dilute the club's enthusiasm for the association game, as by 1874 its membership had nearly halved, and the team did not enter the Cup again. The final match recorded for the club is a 1–0 defeat at Dumbreck in March 1874.

John Mackay did stay on as Scottish FA secretary in 1874–75, but in 1875 he became a Football Association committee member as a nominee of Queen's Park, and by 1878 his loyalties had switched to Govanhill.

== Notable players ==
- William Ker, who played in the first ever official international football match in 1872, in a 0–0 draw at Hamilton Crescent, and who was credited as a member of the Granville
- Thomas Highet, future Scotland international, a "powerful" forward criticized for playing "too independently", a member of the club in 1874

== Colours ==
The club's colours were red, black, and white striped jerseys and stockings.
