= David Wotherspoon (footballer, born 1849) =

Scottish footballer

Personal information
- Date of birth: 9 April 1849
- Place of birth: Hamilton, Scotland
- Date of death: 28 February 1906 (aged 56)
- Place of death: Pollokshields, Scotland
- Position: Defender

Senior career*
Years	Team	Apps	(Gls)
1872	Queen's Park	0	(0)
- Clydesdale

International career
1872–1873	Scotland	2	(0)
- * Club domestic league appearances and goals

David Wotherspoon (9 April 1849 – 28 February 1906) was a Scottish footballer who played as a defender.

== Early and personal life ==
He was born on 9 April 1849 in Hamilton, South Lanarkshire, son of William Wotherspoon, a baker, and Mary Hamilton. He married Mary Galbraith in 1876 and had five daughters.

Wotherspoon died of tuberculosis on 28 February 1906 in Pollokshields, Glasgow.

== Career ==
Wotherspoon played club football for Queen's Park and Clydesdale, and made two appearances for Scotland. He also served as a committee member and club secretary at Queen's Park. He has been credited with the introduction of Queen's Park's black and white hooped kit design.

He made one official competitive appearance for Queen's Park, in the English FA Cup.
