= South Western F.C. =

Former association football club in Scotland

South Western
- Full name: South Western Football Club
- Nickname: the S.W.
- Founded: 1875
- Dissolved: 1883
- Ground: Copeland Park
- Secretary: Hugh C. Fraser
1875–78 colours	1880–83 colours

South Western Football Club (sometimes referred to as Glasgow South Western) (Note: Also stylised as South-Western in contemporary sources.) was a Scottish football club active in the 19th century.

== History ==
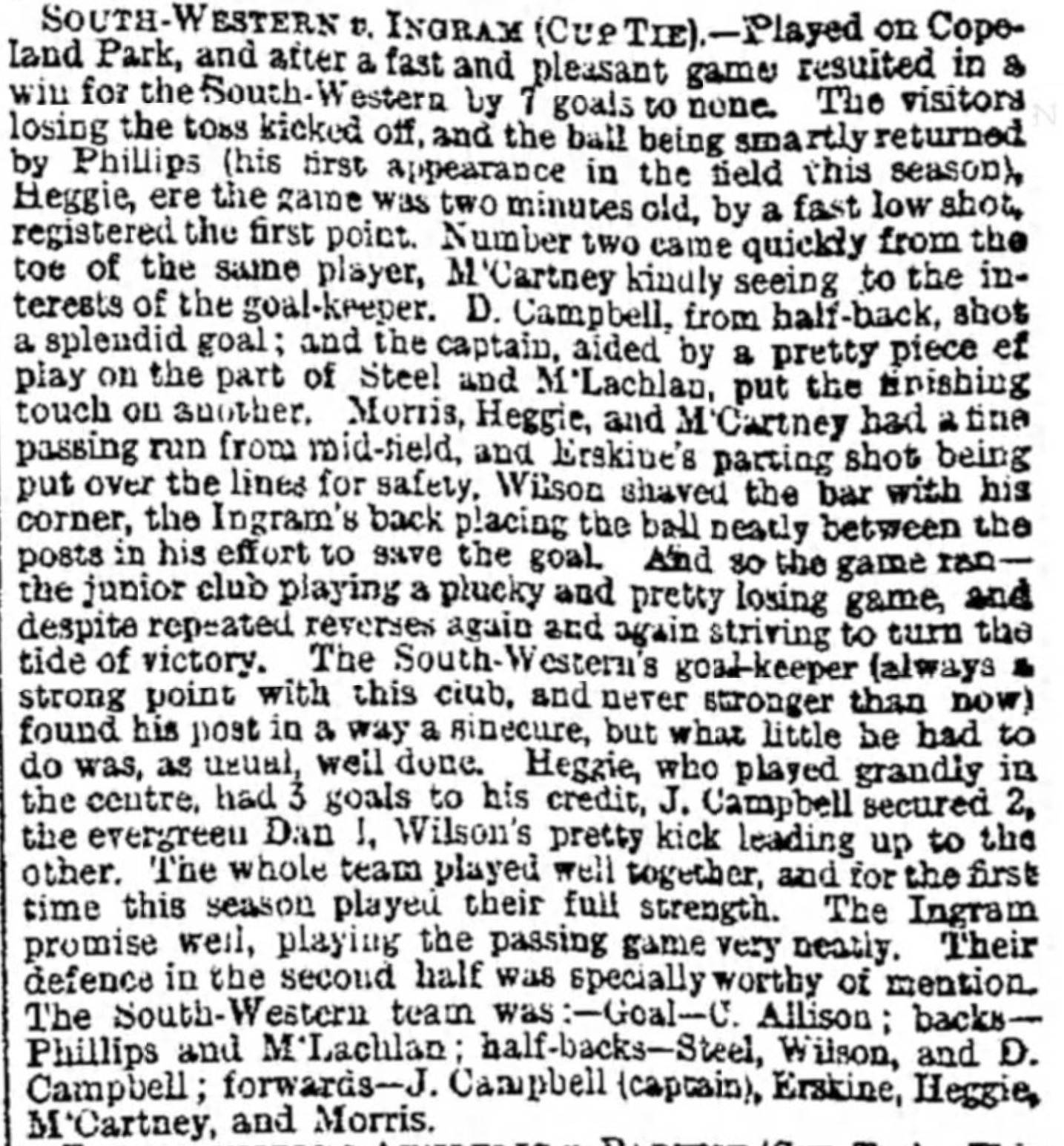
1880–81 Scottish Cup 1st Round, South-Western 7–0 Ingram, Glasgow Herald, 13 September 1880, p. 3

The club was founded in 1875, the first known match being against Govan F.C. at Fairfield Park that December. The club became a member of the Scottish Football Association at the start of the 1876–77 season, in time to enter the Scottish Cup, which it did from that season to 1883–84.

The club's furthest run was to the quarter-finals, which it achieved twice. In 1877–78 the S.W. won (to general surprise) the initial quarter-final match against the 3rd Lanarkshire Rifle Volunteers, before losing 2–1 when the tie was replayed following a protest by their opponents; the protest being that the ropes around the ground were not secure enough to keep the spectators back, and there was therefore interference with play, although the Volunteers did not protest before the match. South Western protested about the Scottish FA's decision, to no avail.

The club reached the same stage again in 1879–80, losing 6–1 to Pollokshields Athletic. In 1880–81 the club lost 4–3 at Arthurlie in the third round, but protested on the basis that the final half-an-hour was played in the dark, and "the home team again and again claimed to have scored, and every run, no matter where it finished, was hailed with shouts of a goal by the spectators". The protest was successful, and the tie re-played, with South-Western scoring a last-minute equalizer with a shot from Allan going in off the bar. However no further replays took place as South-Western was disqualified for an unknown reason.

Despite joining the newly formed Glasgow Football Association in April 1883, South Western made its final appearance in the Scottish Cup in September of that year, losing 8–1 against Battlefield in the first round. The club had recently been affected by a tragedy, as James Gordon, Arbroath goalkeeper, had died of injuries received in a match with South-Western the previous month.

Shortly afterwards, it was reported that the South-Western was considering amalgamating with another local club, Pilgrims, for whom some of the South Western players had been guesting. Within the next couple of months, South Western had been absorbed by Pilgrims, who took over the use of Copeland Park.

A club of the same name re-emerged in the area in 1885 (a merger of two local teams, Beaconsfield and Woodbourne) and joined the newly founded Scottish Junior Football Association a year later; they survived until 1894.

== Colours ==
The club's initial colours were black and orange one-inch stripes and white knickerbockers. In 1878 the club changed to cardinal and white, and in 1880 to navy shirts and white shorts.

== Ground ==
The club's home ground was Copeland Park in Govan, (Note: A separate burgh at the time, Govan was later incorporated into Glasgow in 1912.) situated close to Ibrox railway station. The club planned to hire a new ground off the Paisley Road for the start of the 1876–77 season but it did not move.

== Notable players ==
- John Campbell of South Western played for Scotland in an international match against Wales in March 1880.
- John Belger, "the Goalkeeper Smasher", who became captain of Preston North End in the 1880s, and whose career was ended by a broken leg in 1884.
