= Blythswood F.C. =

Former association football club in Scotland

Blythswood
- Full name: Blythswood Football Club
- Founded: 1873
- Dissolved: 1882
- Ground: Westburn Park
- Secretary: George Armstrong
Home colours

Blythswood Football Club was a 19th-century football club based in Glasgow.

== History ==
The club was founded on 14 August 1873 as an offshoot of the Blythswood Cricket Club, which had changed its name from the Bellegrove club in 1866, and which played at Queen's Park until 1869.

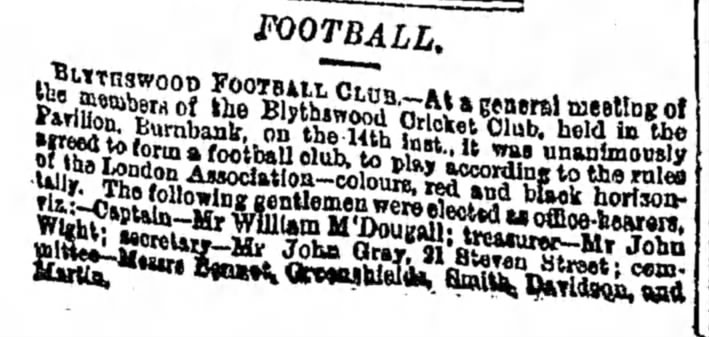
Announcement of the foundation of the Blythswood Football Club, Glasgow Herald, 26 August 1873, page 7

Blythswood was one of the clubs taking part in the first Scottish Cup in 1873–74. Its first entry saw its best run, with two wins taking the club to the semi-final. In the second round, the club won 2–0 at Alexandra Athletic, although it caused a little controversy by appointing one of the club members as its umpire, who then proceeded to give tactical advice during the match; nevertheless the clubs enjoyed a convivial toast afterwards.

In the semi-final, the club was 4–0 down to Clydesdale after 80 minutes, when the match was stopped because of bad light. However the score was allowed to stand.

The club continued to enter until 1878–79, albeit without any success, a number of its players having joined the Western club before the 1874–75 season; the club's final entry saw it drawn away to the Clyde club in the first round, but before the tie took place, Blythswood amalgamated with the Derby club.

In 1880, some of the club members founded a junior offshoot which became a founder member of the Scottish Junior Football Association, and Blythswood played in the inaugural Scottish Junior Cup that season; although the club beat Luton 1–0 in the first round, a protest saw a replay being ordered, and the club eventually lost in a second replay. The last recorded game Blythswood game was a 9–0 defeat to the Hawthorne club in 1882; a game against Glenburn scheduled for the next month does not seem to have taken place.

== Ground ==
The club played at Westburn Park (also known as Burnbank), in Kelvinside, as a senior club. From 1880 the club played at Trinidad Park in Govan.

== Colours ==
The club's colours were red and black 1 inch "stripes", which in the 1870s referred to hoops.
