= Alexandra Athletic F.C. =

Former association football club in Glasgow City, Scotland

Alexandra Athletic
- Full name: Alexandra Athletic Football Club
- Nicknames: the A.A.C., the Athletes
- Founded: 1873
- Dissolved: 1884
- Ground: Kennyhill (now Alexandra) Park, Glasgow
- Match Secretary: Walter Crichton
1876–82 colours

Alexandra Athletic Football Club was a 19th-century football club from Dennistoun, in Glasgow, which participated in the early years of the Scottish Cup.

== History ==
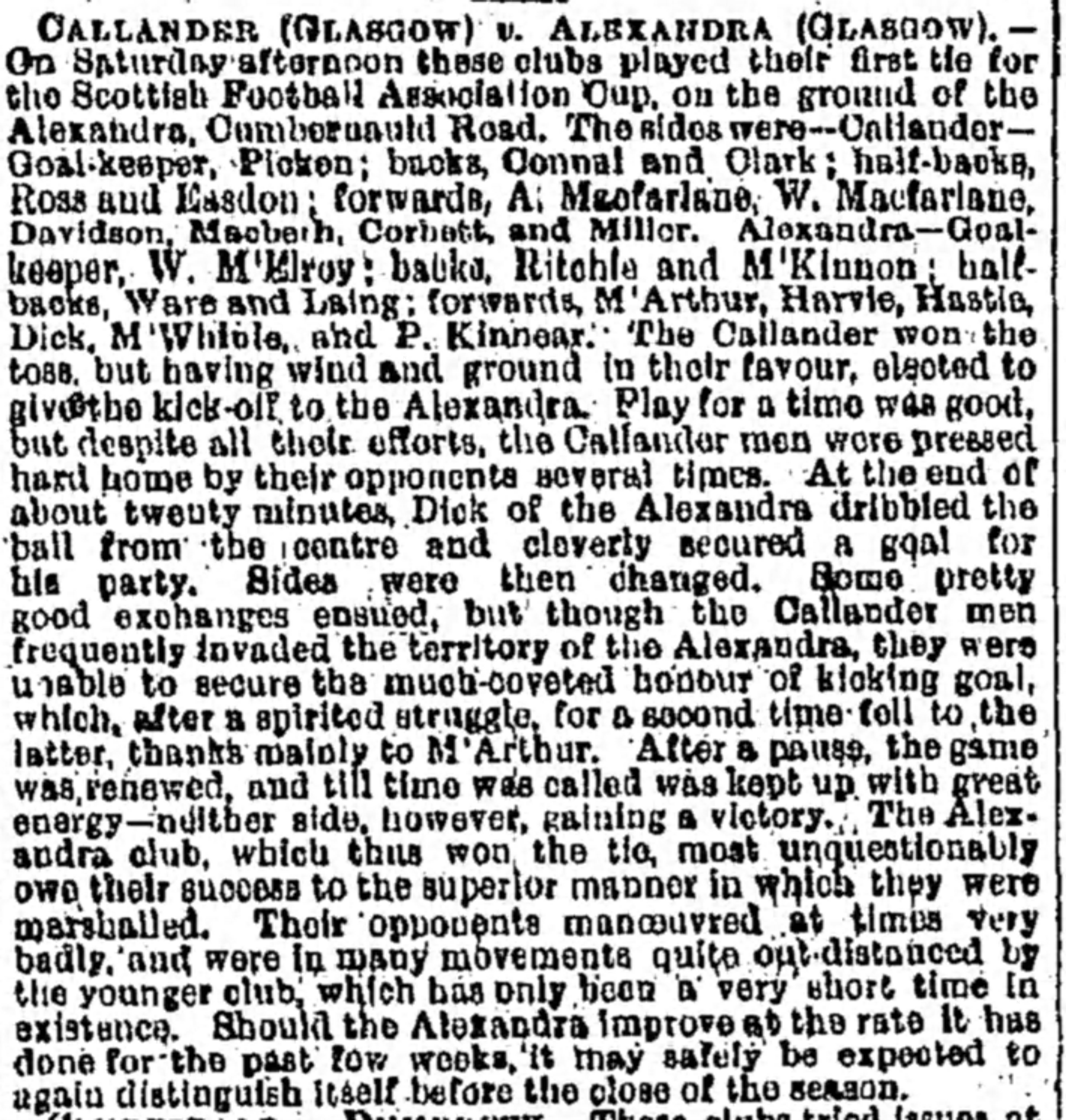
Match report for Alexandra Athletic v Callander, Glasgow Herald, 20 October 1873

The football club was founded in 1873 as an all-round athletics club, with football as the "ruling pastime"; originally, the club's request to use part of Alexandra Park as a home ground was declined, despite the club being "a body of working men...who had done a very gracious thing in asking permission to get the use of a portion of the park". Within two months however the new club was given permission to lease part of the park for sporting activities; by this time the Earl of Glasgow and Robert Dalglish MP had agreed to become the club's patrons and the club had an elite image, with amongst the best sporting facilities and equipment in Glasgow. Indeed, the club's first secretary, William Dick, was also the secretary of the Scottish Football Association.

By the following season, the issue had been sorted out, and the club was able to play its first Scottish FA Cup tie on the park; after beating Callander F.C. at home in the first round, the club lost 2–0 to Blythswood in the second (last eight), the club complaining that the Blythswood-nominated umpire was not merely a member of the Blythswood club, but had also been giving coaching advice during the match; nevertheless the clubs enjoyed a convivial toast after the match.

At the end of 1875, the club played an exhibition match in Dundee, with the aim of promoting the association game there; the one Dundee club that had played association before (in 1871) had quickly switched to rugby.

The club entered the Scottish Cup until 1884, after which there is no further record. The club reached the second round in 1876–77, beating Eastern in the first round, but losing 4–0 at Northern in the second. The win over Eastern was at the third time of asking, the clubs having drawn in the first game, and Eastern winning the second 2–0, but being the subject of a successful post-match protest on the basis that the referee who took charge of the match had not been agreed beforehand; ironically, this was down to Eastern objecting to the Alexandra nominee, but Eastern called the protest "a mean subterfuge to attempt to wrest the honours which have already been fairly won".

The following year, the club bested Lancefield F.C. in the first round but lost 8–0 at Rangers in the next. In 1878–79 the club had its most successful run, reaching the fourth round (last 18), but again losing to Rangers, this time 3–0. The club had suffered a blow the previous month, as it lost the funds it had deposited with the collapsing City of Glasgow Bank.

The club does not seem to have survived the 1883–84 season; the A.A.C. was knocked out of the Cup in the first round by Whitehill, a protest against the state of the pitch being unanimously dismissed. It also did not enter the North-Eastern Cup, which the club had entered for the previous two seasons, without winning a tie.

The club was still enough of a draw towards the end of the season to be invited to the north, and the club lost 9–4 at Arbroath in February 1884, after the club was 4–1 up at half-time. However the final recorded match for the club was an ignominious one - a 15–0 defeat to Cowlairs in the Glasgow North-Eastern Cup in April.

The club was removed from the SFA register in August 1884. On the club's demise, a number of its members and players joined Rangers; club secretary Walter Crichton took the same role at the Light Blues.

== Colours ==
The club played in a variety of colours, mostly arranged around a white and blue schema:

Colours
Years	Jersey colour	Shorts	Socks
1873–74	Blue & white	Blue	(red cap)
1874–76	Brown, blue, & white hoops	White	Blue (red cap)
1876–82	White with blue Prince of Wales feather on left breast	White	
1882–84	White with blue Prince of Wales feather on left breast	Blue	

== Ground ==
The club's Kennyhill Park ground on the Cumbernauld Road was the reason for the club's existence; it had its own clubhouse and was a 10-minute walk from the tramway terminus. After the club's end, the ground was taken over by Dennistoun Athletic, the club formerly known as Whitehill.

== Notable players ==
- James Gossland and Tuck McIntyre, who joined Rangers in 1880 and were later capped for Scotland
- James Duncan, who won two caps for Scotland when playing for the A.A.C., and who also later joined Rangers
