= Dumbreck F.C. =

Former association football club in Scotland

Dumbreck
- Full name: Dumbreck Football Club
- Nickname: The South Side Club
- Founded: 1871
- Dissolved: 1877
- Ground: Middleton Park, Ibroxhill
- Secretary: William Turnbull
Home colours

Dumbreck Football Club was a 19th-century association football club based in Glasgow.

== History ==
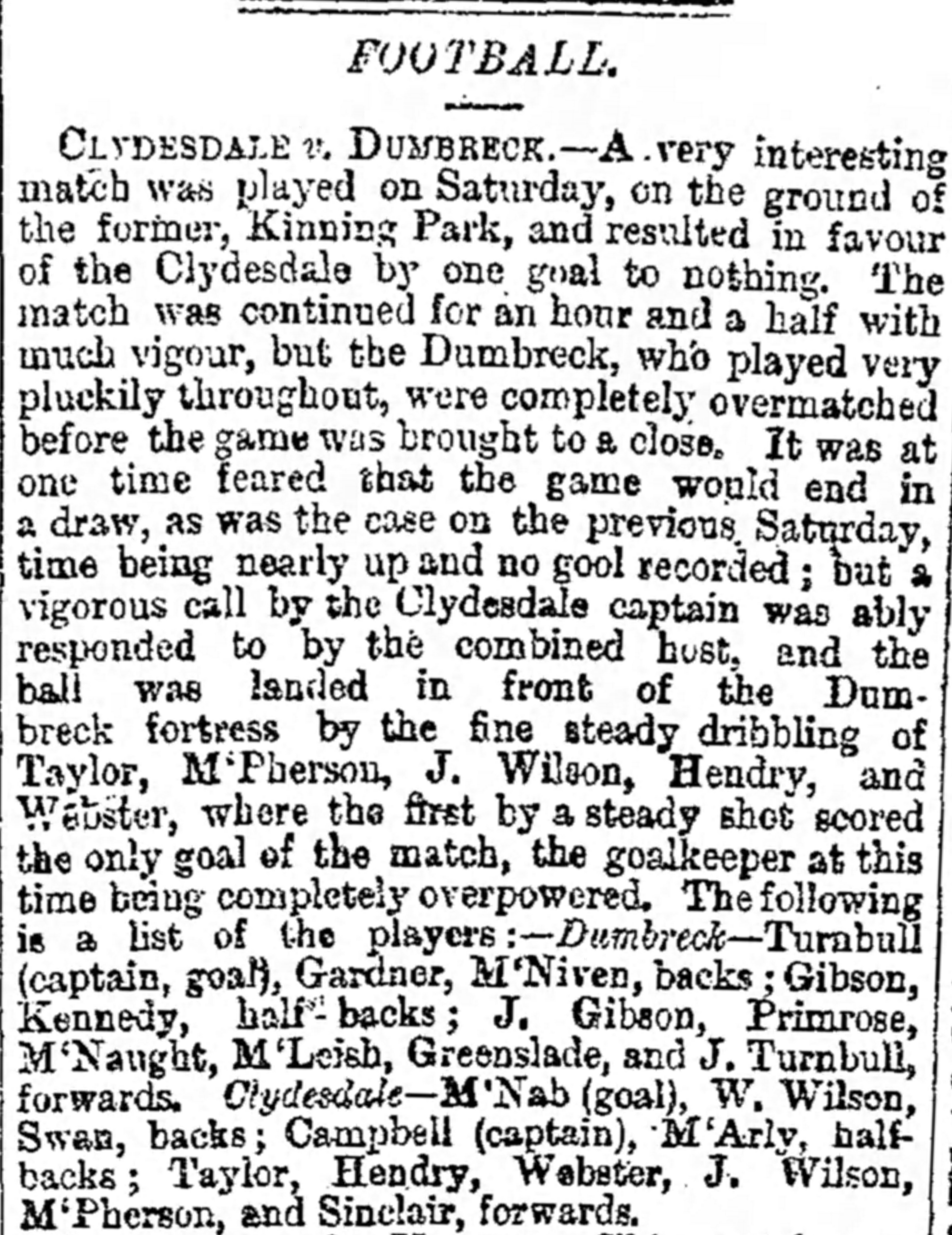
Clydesdale 1–0 Dumbreck, one of the first matches played after the formation of the Scottish FA, 22 March 1873

The club was formed in 1872 out of the Dumbreck Cricket Club and was one of the eight founder members of the Scottish Football Association. Its earliest recorded matches were against the Clydesdale club in early 1873.

Dumbreck was the opposition for Queen's Park on 25 October 1873 for the first match played at the first Hampden Park. It was also the first match in which Queen's Park wore its iconic black and white hooped jerseys.

Dumbreck entered Scottish Cup tournaments between 1873–74 and 1877–78, the club's best run coming in 1875–76, when it reached the quarter-finals (last 7). The club was unlucky to draw the dominant Queen's Park at that stage and lost 2–0; the club protested after the match about one of the Queen's Park goals. One noteworthy factor was that the Dumbreck goalkeeper M'Geoch was a pioneer in drop-kicking the ball, rather than kicking it from dead, which was considered at the time to generate greater distance.

Although the club was active in the Scottish FA committees until 1877, and (with 75 members in 1876) was on a par with Rangers, the club disappeared before the 1877–78 season. It withdrew from the Scottish Cup rather than face the new Shawfield club having resolved not to play any more fixtures.

== Colours ==
Dumbreck played in blue shirts with white shorts, with scarlet stockings in 1873 and black and white stockings in 1874.

== Notable players ==
- Alex M'Geoch (also spelled McGeoch), who represented Scotland on four occasions.
