= Clydesdale F.C. =

Former association football club in Scotland

Clydesdale
- Full name: Clydesdale Football Club
- Founded: 1872
- Dissolved: 1881
- Ground: Kinning Park (1872–1876), Titwood Park (1876–1881)
- Hon. Secretary: A. M'Donald, (from 1880) John Mitchell of W. B. M'Iver of Regent Street
Home colours

Clydesdale F.C. was a nineteenth-century Glasgow-based football club, which was attached to Clydesdale Cricket Club.

== History ==
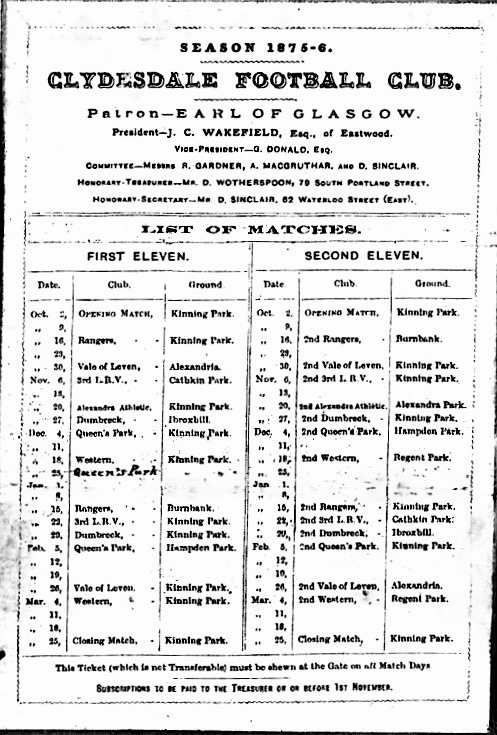
Clydesdale Football Club fixture card for 1875–76

The club was formed in 1872, in the wake of the Queen's Park. In 1873, Clydesdale was one of the teams to found the Scottish Football Association, with the club's Archibald Campbell being appointed president, and made a generous donation of £5 towards the cost of the Scottish Cup. This was more than any team other than Queen's Park, which had a much larger membership (103 to Clydesdale's 30 at the time).

The first Clydesdale player to represent Scotland was William Gibb, who played against England in 1873, scoring a goal.

The club's fortune took a turn for the better in November 1873 after a dispute within Queen's Park led to international player Frederick Anderson joining Clydesdale, soon followed by a number of players, including internationals Robert W Gardner, who had been the Scottish captain, and David Wotherspoon, who had been the best man at his wedding. The bitterness from the split meant Gardner lost the captaincy of the Scottish national side, although he remained captain of the Glasgow select side and teams in trial matches for selecting the Scottish XI.

=== 1874 Scottish Cup final ===
The new players were available to Clydesdale in the first Scottish Cup tournament in 1873–74. Clydesdale had won 6–0 in the first round against Granville, with McPherson scoring the competition's first hat-trick. In the second round, it took two replays for the club to get past the 3rd Lanarkshire Rifle Volunteers; that put the club through to a semi-final against Blythswood, which ended after 80 minutes, when the match was stopped because of bad light. However, as Clydesdale was 4–0 up, the result was allowed to stand and Clydesdale put into the final at the first Hampden Park against Queen's Park.

After half-an-hour of the final, with the scores goalless, a Raeburn shot was fumbled by Dickson in the Queen's Park goal, and the ball "dribbled through between himself and the goalpost" with the spectators behind the goal unanimous in saying that "we all saw definitely – and had not the very slightest doubt – that the ball passed off the goalkeeper's hands between the posts". However the referee refused to award a goal, as only one umpire decided the ball had crossed the line. Early in the second half, with the wind behind Queen's Park, Billy MacKinnon gave the senior club the lead with "a powerful shot after a superb individual run". Robert Leckie scored Queen's Park's second goal with a shot not long before time was called.

=== 1875 Scottish Cup semi-final ===
It proved to be the club's only final, and although it was the strongest competitor to Queen's Park over the next couple of years, it could not quite get past the older club, losing in the semi-final to it in 1874–75 in a second replay. The club had had a walkover against Vale of Leven in the first round, as Clydesdale protested the presence of John Ferguson before the tie, who, as a former professional athlete, was barred from playing in the competition at the time, even though Ferguson was described as an amateur who "usually wrought in the Vale of Leven from year to year, and no objection was made to him in the international match"; the tie was played under protest, and, after a goalless draw, Vale withdrew rather than re-play. The 0–0 draw with Queen's Park in the first semi-final, at Kinning Park before 3,000 spectators, made Clydesdale only the second Scottish club to hold Queen's Park to a draw. The replay (before a crowd of 5,000 at the original Hampden) saw Clydesdale become the first club to score twice against Queen's Park, but, although twice ahead, the club could not hold on to the lead. It took an own goal to separate the sides in the second replay.

=== Later years ===
In 1877, Clydesdale proposed a change to the Laws of the Game, that a throw-in could go in any direction rather than being perpendicular to the touchline as in the English Football Association's rules, and instead of a kick in any direction under the Sheffield Rules; although originally rejected, it was soon brought helping to unify the Sheffield rules and association football law.

However the 1877–78 season was something of a last hurrah for the club, with a number of players leaving over the summer, although Gardner (by now Scottish FA President) and his friend Wotherspoon remained faithful to the club. After losing to Queen's Park in the second round of the competition in 1877–78, the club did not play another tie; in 1878–79 the club conceded a bye to Dennistoun (which was subsequently disqualified) and in the following three seasons the club scratched.

== Colours ==
Clydesdale played in blue and yellow hoops, described as "gold bars" at one point. The strips were made by Forsyths of Renfield Street.

== Ground ==
The club played at the cricket club's ground at Kinning Park, and stayed within the park after the cricket club sold the lease to its pitch to Rangers. The club moved with the cricket club to Titwood in 1876. The Titwood goals had a bar as early as 1877.

== Notable players ==
The following Clydesdale players represented Scotland when registered with the club:

- Robert Gardner
- David Wotherspoon
- Frederick Anderson
- John McPherson
- William Gibb
- Jimmy Lang
- James Richmond
