= Scottish Football Association =

Governing body of football in Scotland

UEFA
- Founded: 13 March 1873; 153 years ago
- Headquarters: Hampden Park
- Location: Mount Florida, Glasgow, Scotland
- FIFA affiliation: 1910–1920; 1924–1928; 1946–present
- UEFA affiliation: 15 June 1954; 72 years ago
- IFAB affiliation: 1886
- President: Mike Mulraney
- Vice-President: Les Gray
- Website: www.scottishfa.co.uk

The Scottish Football Association (Scottish Gaelic: Comann Ball-coise na h-Alba; also known as the Scottish FA and the SFA) is the governing body of football in Scotland and has the ultimate responsibility for the control and development of football in Scotland. Members of the SFA include clubs in Scotland, affiliated national associations as well as local associations. It was formed in 1873, making it the second-oldest national football association in the world. It is not to be confused with the Scottish Football Union, which is the name that the SRU was known by until the 1920s.

It is a member of both UEFA and FIFA and holds a permanent seat on the International Football Association Board (IFAB) which is responsible for the Laws of the Game. It is based at Hampden Park in Glasgow. In addition, the Scottish Football Museum is located there.

The Scottish Football Association is responsible for the operation of the Scotland national football team, the annual Scottish Cup and several other duties important to the functioning of the game in Scotland.

== History ==
=== Formation ===
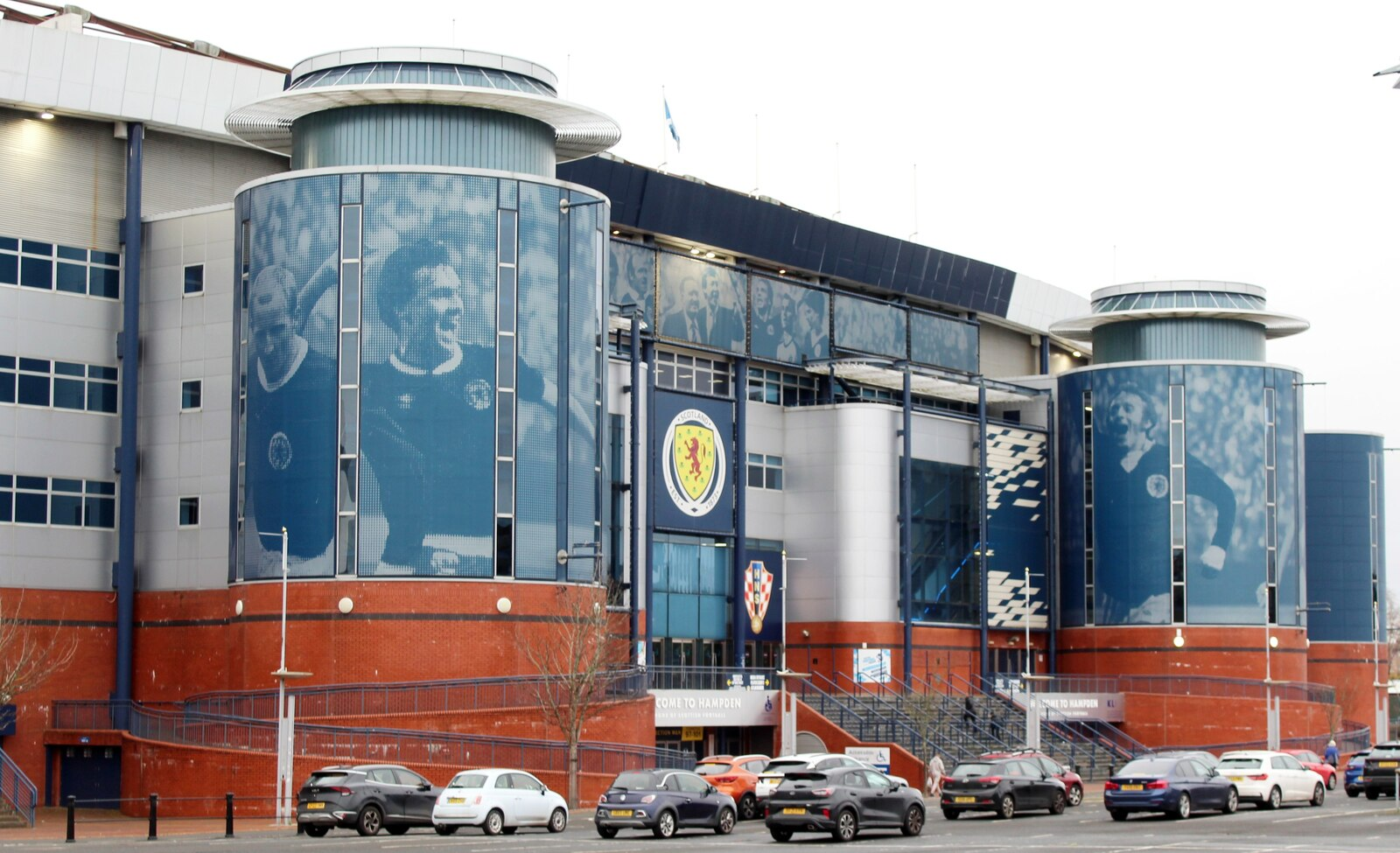
The SFA has its headquarters located within the national stadium in Glasgow

Following the formation of Scotland's earliest football clubs in the 1860s, football experienced a rapid growth but there was no formal structure, and matches were often arranged in a haphazard and irregular fashion.

Queen's Park, a Glasgow club founded in 1867, took the lead, and following an advertisement in a Glasgow newspaper in 1873, representatives from seven clubs – Queen's Park, Clydesdale, Vale of Leven, Dumbreck, Third Lanark, Eastern and Granville – attended a meeting on 13 March 1873. Furthermore, Kilmarnock sent a letter stating their willingness to join.

That day, these eight clubs formed the Scottish Football Association, and resolved that:

The clubs here represented form themselves into an association for the promotion of football according to the rules of The Football Association and that the clubs connected with this association subscribe for a challenge cup to be played for annually, the committee to propose the laws of the competition.

=== Founding members ===
The following eight football clubs founded the Scottish Football Association:

Club Name	Location
Queen's Park	Glasgow
Clydesdale	Glasgow
Vale of Leven	Alexandria
Dumbreck	Glasgow
Third Lanark	Glasgow
Eastern	Glasgow
Granville	Glasgow
Kilmarnock	Kilmarnock

=== Chief Executive ===
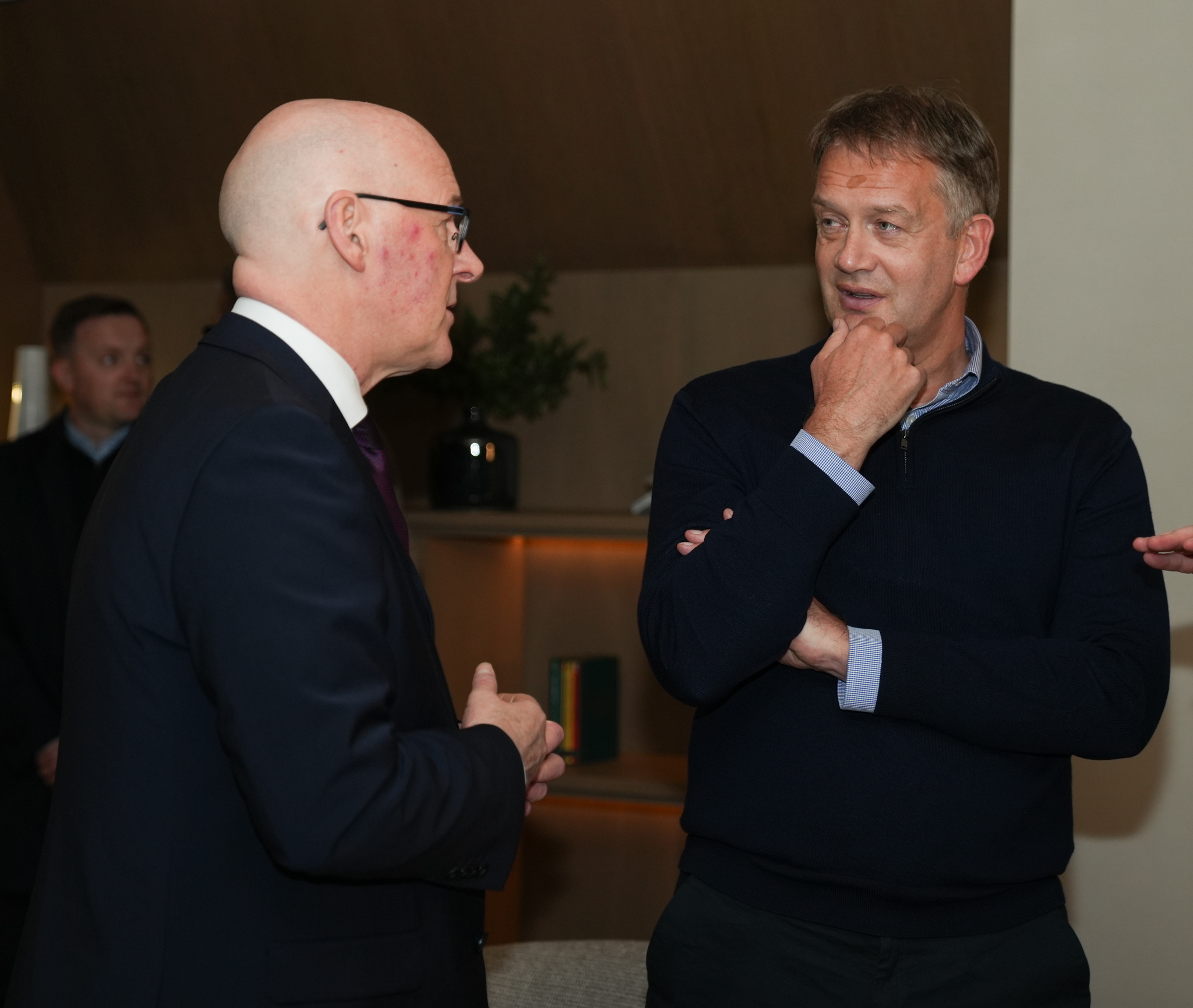
Chief Executive of the SFA, Ian Maxwell, meets First Minister John Swinney, 2026

The chief executive of the Scottish Football Association oversees the development of football in Scotland and the administration of disciplinary matters, and is also responsible for the general organisation of the national side. One of the most prominent roles of the chief executive is to hire and dismiss Scotland national football team managers.

- Archibald Rae (1873–1874)
- J.C. Mackay (1874–1875)
- William Dick (1875–1880)
- James Fleming (1880–1882)
- Robert Livingstone (1882)
- John McDowall (1882–1928)
- Sir George Graham (1928–1957)
- Willie Allan (1957–1977)
- Ernie Walker CBE (1977–1990)
- Jim Farry (1990–1999)
- David Taylor (1999–2007)
- Gordon Smith (2007–2010)
- Stewart Regan (2010–2018)
- Ian Maxwell (2018–present)

== Association overview ==
=== National teams ===
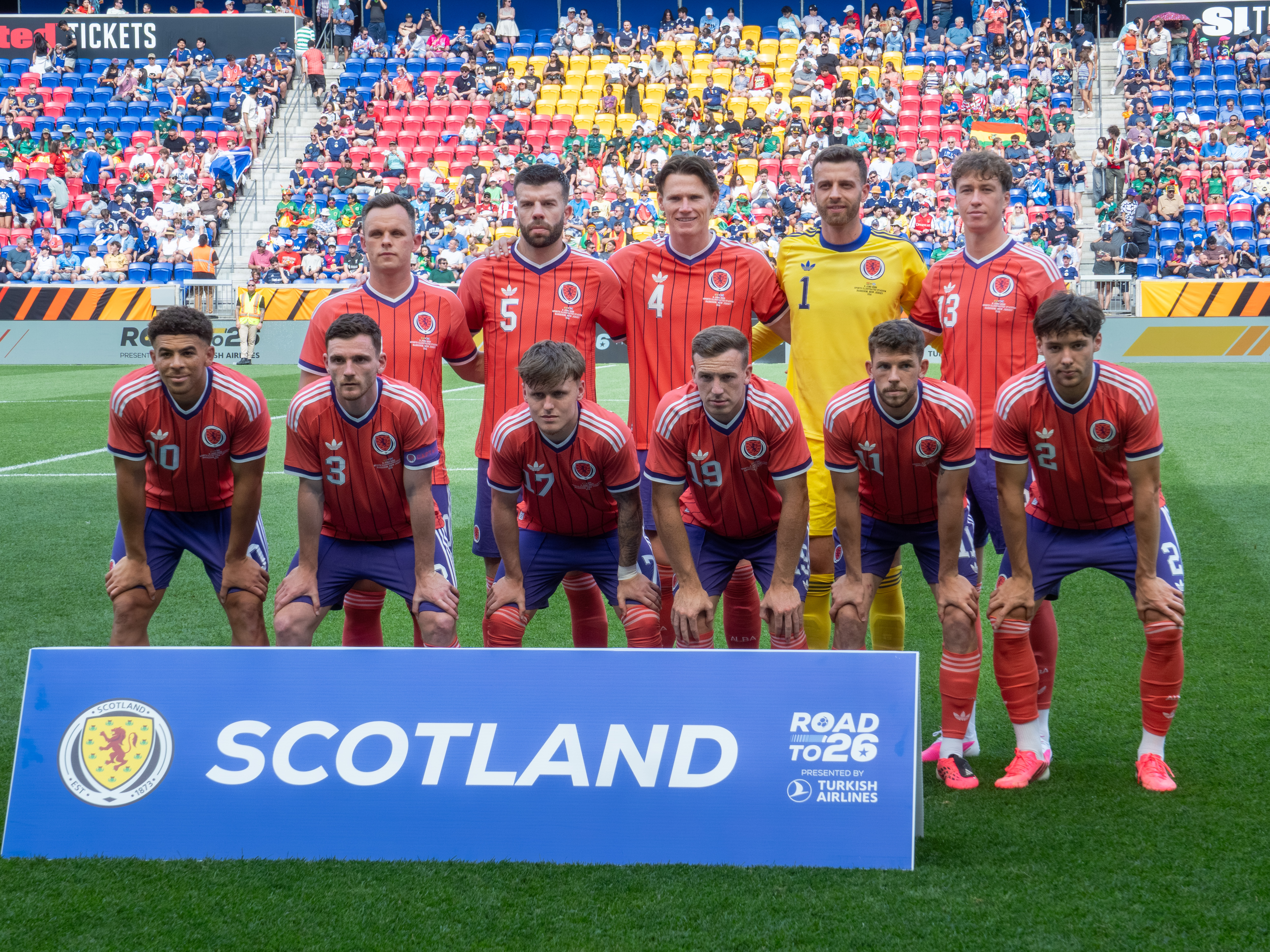
The SFA is responsible for the national football team (pictured in 2026)

As well as the Scotland national football team, the Scottish Football Association is also currently responsible for organising the Scotland national football B team, as well as men's national teams at under-21, under-19, under-18 and under-17 levels. There was also a semi-professional team, but this was disbanded in 2008. In women's football, there is the full Scotland women's national football team, under-19 and under-17 teams. In Futsal, there is a full national side.

=== Club competitions ===
The Scottish Football Association organises the Scottish Cup and the Scottish Youth Cup. Although the SFA are not involved in the day-to-day operation of the Scottish Professional Football League or other league competitions, they do appoint referees to officiate the games in these leagues, as well as dealing with player registrations and disciplinary issues.

=== Club licensing ===
All SFA member clubs are assessed annually in four areas (ground, first team, youth team, and governance) and, if appropriate, awarded a licence at platinum, gold, silver, bronze or entry level. As of June 2025, only Celtic are currently holders of a platinum-level licence, while four others (Hibernian, Rangers, St Johnstone, and St Mirren) hold gold-level licences. All clubs in the Scottish Professional Football League are required to be licensed at bronze level, Highland Football League, and Lowland Football League are required to be licensed at entry level or above.

=== Performance Schools ===
The Scottish Football Association established a number of performance schools around Scotland in 2012 with the aim of developing footballing talent in young people and at grassroots level. The programme is for under-12 players, and will provide them with 800 hours of additional coaching. As of June 2023, seven performance schools exist:

- Hazlehead Academy – Aberdeen (Head Coach: Stuart Glennie)
- St John's Roman Catholic High School – Dundee (Head Coach: Iain Jenkins)
- Broughton High School – Edinburgh (Head Coach: Keith Wright)
- Graeme High School – Falkirk (Head Coach: Ian Ross)
- Holyrood Secondary School – Glasgow (Head Coach: Joe McBride)
- Grange Academy – Kilmarnock (Head Coach: James Grady)
- Braidhurst High School – Motherwell (Head Coach: Stephen Clarke)

== Member clubs ==
As of June 2026, 134 clubs are full members of the Scottish Football Association, comprising:

- All 42 clubs in the Scottish Professional Football League
- All 18 clubs in the Highland Football League
- All 16 clubs in the Lowland Football League East
- All 16 clubs in the Lowland Football League West
- 1 club in the North Caledonian League:
  - Golspie Sutherland
- 22 clubs in the East of Scotland Football League:
  - Blackburn United, Burntisland Shipyard, Camelon Juniors, Coldstream, Dalkeith Thistle, Dunbar United, Dundonald Bluebell, Easthouses Lily Miners Welfare, Haddington Athletic, Hawick Royal Albert, Jeanfield Swifts, Lothian Thistle Hutchison Vale, Newtongrange Star, Penicuik Athletic, Preston Athletic, Sauchie Juniors, St Andrews United, Tweedmouth Rangers Tynecastle, Vale of Leithen, and Whitehill Welfare
- 2 clubs in the Midlands Football League:
  - Broughty Athletic and Tayport
- 3 clubs in the South of Scotland Football League:
  - Creetown, St Cuthbert Wanderers, and Wigtown & Bladnoch
- 14 clubs in the West of Scotland Football League:
  - Benburb, Bonnyton Thistle, Carluke Rovers, Darvel, Drumchapel United, Girvan, Glasgow University, Glenafton Athletic, Irvine Meadow XI, Kirkintilloch Rob Roy, Rutherglen Glencairn, St Cadoc's, Threave Rovers, and Whitletts Victoria

== Affiliated associations ==
=== National associations ===
The Scottish Football Association has affiliated to it the following seven national associations:

- Scottish Amateur Football Association
- Scottish Junior Football Association
- Scottish Para Football Association
- Scottish Schools Football Association
- Scottish Welfare Football Association
- Scottish Women's Football
- Scottish Youth Football Association

=== Local associations ===
There are 10 local associations affiliated and the competitions they manage are also listed below:

- Aberdeenshire and District Football Association
  - Aberdeenshire Cup
  - Aberdeenshire Shield
  - Aberdeenshire League
- East of Scotland Football Association
  - East of Scotland Cup
  - East of Scotland Shield
  - King Cup
  - East of Scotland Qualifying Cup
  - Alex Jack Cup
- Fife Football Association
  - Fife Cup
- Forfarshire Football Association
  - Forfarshire FA Challenge Cup
- Glasgow Football Association
  - The City of Glasgow Cup
- North of Scotland Football Association
  - North of Scotland Cup
  - North of Scotland FA U20 League
- Southern Counties Football Association
  - Alba Cup
  - Southern Counties FA Challenge Cup
  - J Haig Gordon Memorial Trophy
  - Potts Cup
  - East, South and West of Scotland Cup Winners Shield
  - South Region Challenge Cup
- Stirlingshire Football Association
  - Stirlingshire Cup
- West of Scotland Football Association
  - Renfrewshire Cup
  - Renfrewshire Victoria Cup
- Wigtownshire & District Football Association
  - Cree Lodge Cup
  - Tweedie Cup
- 5 North Caledonian Football Association competitions also registered:
  - North Caledonian League
  - Ness Cup
  - North Caledonian Cup
  - Football Times Cup
  - Jock Mackay Cup

=== Recognised leagues ===
The following six leagues with their affiliated leagues and cups are recognised by The Scottish Football Association:

- Scottish Professional Football League
  - Scottish League Cup
  - Scottish Challenge Cup
- Scottish Highland Football League
  - Highland League Cup
  - SHFL U17 League
- Scottish Lowland Football League
  - Lowland League Cup
  - Lowlands Development League
  - Lowlands Development League Cup
  - Lowlands Development Challenge Cup
  - Lowlands Development Knock Out Cup
- East of Scotland Football League
  - East of Scotland Football League Cup
- West of Scotland Football League
  - West of Scotland Football League Cup
  - Strathclyde Cup
- South of Scotland Football League
  - South of Scotland Football League Cup
