= 1870s Rangers F.C. seasons =

Rangers were founded in 1872, and began competitive play in 1874. The team then participated in the Scottish Cup during every season for the rest of the decade. Though they did not win the Scottish cup during the 1870s, Rangers reached the final round twice.

== 1874–75 season ==
Rangers
1874–75 season
- President: William McBeath
- Ground: Flesher's Haugh
- Scottish Cup: Second round
- Top goalscorer: League: All: Moses McNeil, David Gibb (1)
Home colours

The 1874–75 season was the first season of competitive football by Rangers.

=== Overview ===
Rangers entered the Scottish Cup for the first time and reached the second round where they lost to Dumbarton after a replay.

Between 1873 and 1879, Rangers played in their now traditional royal blue shirts and white shorts.

=== Scottish Cup ===
Date	Round	Opponents	H / A	Result F–A	Scorers	Attendance
10 October 1874	First round	Oxford	A	2–0	M. McNeil, Gibb	
28 November 1874	Second round	Dumbarton	H	0–0		
12 December 1874	Second round	Dumbarton	A	0–1		

== 1875–76 season ==
Rangers
1875–76 season
- Match Secretary: John Campbell
- Ground: Burnbank Park
- Scottish Cup: Second round
- Top goalscorer: League: All: John Campbell (3)
Home colours

The 1875–76 season was the second season of competitive football by Rangers.

=== Overview ===
Rangers entered the Scottish Cup for the second time. They equalled their previous best in the competition by reaching the second round where they lost to 3rd Lanark RV after a replay.

=== Scottish Cup ===
Date	Round	Opponents	H / A	Result F–A	Scorers	Attendance
16 October 1875	First round	1st Lanark RV	H	7–0	J. Campbell (3), Watson (2), P. Campbell, Phillips	
30 October 1875	Second round	3rd Lanark RV	A	1–0	P. Campbell	
13 November 1875	Second round replay	3rd Lanark RV	H	1–2	M. McNeil	2,000

Notes

1. A-3rd Lanark RV protested the result after Rangers kicked-off in both halves. The match was declared void and replayed two weeks later.

=== Friendlies ===
Date	Opponents	H / A	Result F–A	Scorers	Attendance
11 September 1875	Vale of Leven	H	1–1		
18 March 1876	Clydesdale	H	0–0		

== 1876–77 season ==
Rangers
1876–77 season
- President: James McBlane Watt
- Match Secretary: Peter McNeil
- Ground: Kinning Park
- Scottish Cup: Runners-up
Home colours	Away colours

The 1876–77 season was the third season of competitive football by Rangers.

=== Overview ===
Rangers entered the Scottish Cup for the third time. Wins over Queen's Park Juniors and Towerhill saw Rangers go one stage further than the previous two seasons as they reached the third round where they were given a bye to the fourth round. They then defeated Mauchline and Lennox to reach the semi-finals for the first time. With only three teams in the semi-finals, Rangers were the lucky ones to receive a bye straight to the final where they would play Vale of Leven. After two 1–1 draws at Hamilton Crescent, Vale finally overcame their opponents 3–2 at the original Hampden Park thanks to an 88th-minute winner from Robert Paton.

=== Scottish Cup ===
Date	Round	Opponents	H / A	Result F–A	Scorers	Attendance
30 September 1876	First round	Queen's Park Juniors	H	4–1	J. Campbell	
21 October 1876	Second round	Towerhill	H	8–0	Dunlop (2), Watson (2), Marshall (2), P. Campbell (2)	
November 1876	Third round	Bye				
9 December 1876	Fourth round	Mauchline	H	3–0	Watson, Marshall, P. Campbell	
30 December 1876	Quarter-final	Lennox	H	3–0	Dunlop, Marshall, P. Campbell	
January 1877	Semi-final	Bye				
17 March 1877	Final	Vale of Leven	N	1–1	McDougall 65' (o.g.)	8,000
7 April 1877	Final replay	Vale of Leven	N	1–1	Dunlop 20'	15,000
13 April 1877	Final second replay	Vale of Leven	N	2–3	W. McNeil, P. Campbell	12,000

== 1877–78 season ==
Rangers
1877–78 season
- Match Secretary: Peter McNeil
- Ground: Kinning Park
- Scottish Cup: Fourth round
Home colours

The 1877–78 season was the fourth season of competitive football by Rangers.

=== Overview ===
Rangers entered the Scottish Cup for the fourth time. In the first round, they set a new club record for the biggest win after defeating Possilpark 13–0. Wins over Alexandra Athletic and Uddingston saw Rangers through to the fourth round where they lost to defending champions Vale of Leven after a replay.

=== Scottish Cup ===
Date	Round	Opponents	H / A	Result F–A	Scorers	Attendance
6 October 1877	First round	Possilpark	H	13–0	*Ricketts, Hill (2), J. Campbell (2), Marshall (2), Watson (2), M. McNeil, P. Campbell (3)	
27 October 1877	Second round	Alexandra Athletic	H	8–0	Dunlop, J. Campbell, M. McNeil (3), P. Campbell (3)	
10 November 1877	Third round	Uddingston	H	13–0	Hill, J. Campbell, Marshall (4), Watson (4), McNeil (2), P. Campbell	

Date	Round	Opponent	Venue	Result	Attendance	Scorers
1 December 1877	R4	Vale of Leven	H	0–0	4,000	
15 December 1877	R4 R	Vale of Leven	A	0–4	4,000	

== 1878–79 season ==
Rangers
1878–79 season
- Match Secretary: Peter McNeil
- Ground: Kinning Park
- Scottish Cup: Runners-up
Home colours

The 1878–79 season was the fifth season of competitive football by Rangers.

=== Overview ===
Rangers played a total of 7 competitive matches during the 1878–79 season.

=== Results ===
All results are written with Rangers' score first.

==== Scottish Cup ====
Date	Round	Opponent	Venue	Result	Attendance	Scorers
28 September 1878	R1	Shaftesbury	H	3-0		
19 October 1878	R2	Whitefield	A	6–1		
9 November 1878	R3	Parkgrove	H	8–2	3,000	
30 November 1878	R4	Alexandria Athletic	H	3-0		
8 March 1879	R5	Partick	H	4-0		
22 March 1879	QF	Queen's Park	A	1-0		
29 March 1879	SF			Bye		
19 April 1879	F	Vale of Leven	N	1–1	28,000	

== 1879–80 season ==
Rangers
1879–80 season
- Match Secretary: Peter McNeil
- Ground: Kinning Park
- Scottish Cup: First round
Home colours

The 1879–80 season was the sixth season of competitive football by Rangers.

=== Overview ===
Rangers played a total of 2 competitive matches during the 1879–80 season.

=== Results ===
All results are written with Rangers' score first.

==== Scottish Cup ====
Date	Round	Opponent	Venue	Result	Attendance	Scorers
20 September 1879	R1	Queen's Park	H	0–0	7,000	
27 September 1879	R1 R	Queen's Park	A	1–5	5,000	
