= 1878 Scottish Cup final =

1878 Scottish Cup Final
- Event: 1877–78 Scottish Cup
Vale of Leven	3rd Lanark RV
1	0
- Date: 30 March 1878
- Venue: Hampden Park, Crosshill
- Referee: Robert W. Gardner
- Attendance: 5,000

The 1878 Scottish Cup final was the fifth final of the Scottish Cup and the final of the 1877–78 Scottish Cup, the most prestigious knockout football competition in Scotland. The match was played at Hampden Park in Crosshill (today part of Glasgow) on 30 March 1878 and was watched by a crowd of 5,000 spectators. The final was contested by the defending champions Vale of Leven and 3rd Lanark RV who had never won the cup.

Scotland international forward John McDougall scored the only goal of the game after 65 minutes to give Vale of Leven a 1–0 victory and a second successive cup triumph.

== Background ==
For both defending champions Vale of Leven and 3rd Lanark RV, the 1878 final marked their second appearance in the Scottish Cup final. Vale of Leven had beaten Rangers in the 1877 final while 3rd Lanark RV lost to the defending champions, Queen's Park, in 1876.

The teams' only prior meeting was in the previous season's competition when Vale of Leven recorded a 1–0 third-round win on their way to lifting the trophy for the first time.

== Route to the final ==
Both teams progressed through six previous rounds to reach the final.

=== Vale of Leven ===
Round	Opposition	Score
First round	Kilmaronock Thistle	w/o
Second round	Dumbarton	1–1
Second round replay	Dumbarton	4–1
Third round	Lennox	3–0
Fourth round	Rangers	0–0
Fourth round replay	Rangers	5–0
Fifth round	Jordanhill	10–0
Quarter-final	Parkgrove	5–0
Semi-final	bye	

Vale of Leven were given a walkover in the First Round of the cup, before being handed a second round tie away at Dumbarton. They drew 1–1 at Dumbarton before sealing a 4–1 victory in the replay. Vale progressed through the third round with a 3–0 win over Lennox to secure a fourth round tie against Rangers. The first match ended in a goalless draw, but Rangers were soundly beaten 5–0 in the replay at home. A convincing 10–0 win over Jordanhill followed in the fifth round to set up a quarter-final match against Parkgrove. Vale of Leven won 5–0 and were then given a bye in the semi-final stage.

=== 3rd Lanark RV ===
Round	Opposition	Score
First round	Clyde	1–0
Second round	Derby	11–0
Third round	Queen's Park	1–0
Fourth round	Govan	7–0
Fifth round	Beith	4–0
Quarter-final	South Western	0–1 (match void)
Quarter-final replay	South Western	2–1
Semi-final	Renton	3–1 (match void)
Semi-final replay	Renton	1–1
Semi-final second replay	Renton	1–0

3rd Lanark RV's cup campaign began with a 1–0 win away at Clyde to give the team a second round tie against Derby, who they defeated 11–0 at Cathkin Park. The team secured a 1–0 victory at home to Queen's Park in the third round. In the fourth round, 3rd Lanark RV again won at home, this time defeating Govan 7–0. They were then again handed a home tie in the fifth round and were again victorious, beating Beith 4–0. The Volunteers appeared to have suffered a surprise upset in the quarter-final against South-Western, but a protest about inadequate pitch security was upheld, and the Thirds won the replay, before eventually overcoming Renton after two replays in the semi-final.

== Match details ==
=== Report ===
A large crowd of all ages filled the Hampden grandstand an hour before kick-off, and the ground was so full that the perimeter fence was also fully occupied. The Vale was favoured, although the game was expected to be rough, "both teams having the reputation of being capable of taking full advantage of the rule which allows of charging". The Vale was in all dark blue and the Thirds in red and white; the Vale the taller side, the Thirds the "wider". The game was not a scientific exhibition of skill, the game being notable for "long kicking, fierce charging, and indiscreet tackling".

The only goal of the game came in the first half, the Vale breaking upfield after the Volunteers had a run of shots saved by Parlane; McDougall and Ferguson manoeuvred close to the Volunteers' goal, and John Hunter in defence tried to head a McDougall shot wide, but "it touched the wrong part of his head, and passed between the posts". The Thirds nearly scored on half-time, a scrimmage on the Vale goal-line being interrupted by the umpires signalling the end of the half. In the second half, Somers had a free-kick for Thirds six yards out after McIntyre handled a shot, but he sent the ball over the bar; from the resulting goal-kick, Vale in turn gained a free-kick close to the Volunteers' goal, and McIntyre sent the ball through the posts, but, as nobody touched the ball en route, and under the regulations at the time all free-kicks were indirect, there was no goal.

30 March 1878

Vale of Leven	1–0	3rd Lanark RV
J. Hunter 25' (o.g.)	Report

Hampden Park, Crosshill
Attendance: 5,000
Referee: Robert W. Gardner

Vale of Leven	3rd Lanark RV

VALE OF LEVEN:
GK	Robert Parlane
FB	Andrew McIntyre
FB	Alex McLintock
HB	Will Jamieson
HB	John McPherson
FW	John Campbell Baird
FW	John McDougall (c)
FW	James J. Baird
FW	John McGregor
FW	John McFarlane
FW	John Ferguson
Manager:
John B. Wright

3RD LANARK RV:
GK	John Wallace (c)
FB	John Hunter
FB	William Somers
HB	Sandy Kennedy
HB	John McKenzie
FW	John Kay
FW	J. McCririck
FW	James Lang
FW	W. Peden
FW	Archie Hunter
FW	William Miller
Manager:
None
