= 1879 Scottish Cup final =

- Event: 1878–79 Scottish Cup
Vale of Leven	Rangers
1	1
- Date: 19 April 1879
- Venue: Hampden Park, Crosshill
- Referee: J. Wallace (Beith)
- Attendance: 6,000

Replay
Vale of Leven	Rangers
–	–
- Rangers refused to play. Vale of Leven awarded the cup.
- Date: 26 April 1879

The 1879 Scottish Cup final was the sixth final of the Scottish Cup and the final of the 1878–79 Scottish Cup, the most prestigious knockout football competition in Scotland. The match was played at Hampden Park in Crosshill (today part of Glasgow) on 19 April 1879 and was watched by a crowd of 6,000 spectators. The final was contested by the defending champions Vale of Leven and Rangers who had never won the cup.

The match finished 1–1 and would have been replayed; however, Rangers objected to a disallowed goal in the original match and refused to play the replay and the cup was awarded to Vale of Leven.

== Background ==
Two-time defending champions Vale of Leven reached the final for the third time and had lifted the trophy in both their previous appearances in 1876 and 1877. A third triumph would equal both Queen's Park's records at the time for most Scottish Cup wins and most consecutive Scottish Cup wins.

The match marked the third time Vale of Leven and Rangers would contest a Scottish Cup tie. Vale won both previous meetings but had required replays to do so, although they would win the trophy on both occasions. They defeated Rangers 3–2 after a second replay in the 1877 final and advanced from a fourth round replay with a 5–0 win in 1877–78.

== Route to the final ==
Both teams progressed through six previous rounds to reach the final.

=== Vale of Leven ===
Round	Opposition	Score
First round	Alclutha	6–0
Second round	Renton Thistle	11–0
Third round	Jamestown	15–0
Fourth round	Govan	11–1
Fifth round	Beith	6–1
Quarter-final	Dumbarton	3–1
Semi-final	Helensburgh	3–0

=== Rangers ===
Round	Opposition	Score
First round	Shaftesbury	3–0
Second round	Whitefield	6–1
Third round	Parkgrove	8–2
Fourth round	Alexandra Athletic	3–0
Fifth round	Partick	4–0
Quarter-final	Queen's Park	1–0
Semi-final	bye	

== Match details ==
=== Original ===
==== Report ====
Just before the match started, there was drama as the wooden pavilion was so overburdened with spectators that it collapsed, burying several boys, with one severely hurt.

Rangers kicked off with the advantage of a "stiffish breeze" behind, and had all the early pressure, twice skimming the bar in the early exchanges. The Vale's first chance came after about ten minutes, ending with a wide shot, and Rangers took the ball from the goal kick up the field "with scarcely a break", ending with Struthers scoring after "a short but brilliant piece of dribbling". Struthers claimed a second goal after he nodded home a Dunlop lob which Parlane had mishandled, but he was ruled offside.

With the wind against Rangers in the second half, McDougall pulled one of the forwards out of the front line to strengthen the backs. Vale only really started to perform to its capabilities in the last 20 minutes, also having a "goal" disallowed as a McIntyre free-kick from 20 yards out was sent between the posts without anyone touching the ball (as required under the laws then), and J. C. Baird struck the Light Blues' bar soon afterwards, but Rangers tended to have most of the possession - albeit ruining chances to score by relying on long shots rather than working the ball closer. Rangers paid the penalty with three minutes remaining as Vale, playing "with something akin to desperation", equalized; McDougall extricated the ball from a scrimmage a few yards from goal, passed to Ferguson, who dribbled past Drinnan, and sent a low shot just inside the left-hand post.

19 April 1879
15:00

Vale of Leven	1–1	Rangers
Ferguson 87'	Report	Struthers 12'

Hampden Park, Crosshill
Attendance: 6,000
Referee: J. Wallace (Beith)

VALE OF LEVEN:
GK	Robert Parlane
FB	Alex McLintock
FB	Andrew McIntyre
HB	James McIntyre
HB	John McPherson
FW	Johnny McFarlane
FW	John Ferguson
FW	James Baird
FW	Peter McGregor
FW	John Campbell Baird
FW	John McDougall (c)

Rangers:
GK	George Gillespie
FB	Alex Vallance
FB	Tom Vallance (c)
HB	James Drinnan
HB	Hugh McIntyre
FW	David Hill
FW	William Dunlop
FW	Archie Steel
FW	Willie Struthers
FW	Peter Campbell
FW	Moses McNeil

=== Replay ===
==== Protest ====
Before leaving the pitch in the original game, Rangers lodged a protest in respect of Struthers' disallowed goal. The Scottish FA Committee considered the protest on 21 April, and ruled that, "as the point was one connected with the play", it was a matter for the officials, and it could not therefore interfere. The Scottish FA therefore arranged the replay for 26 April, with provision for an extra half-an-hour if necessary.

The Vale duly turned up at Hampden, but found no opponent present, as Rangers had asked - unsuccessfully - to have the appeal heard by the full association, rather than simply the committee. The referee and umpires declared Vale had duly won the Cup.

26 April 1879

Vale of Leven	w/o	Rangers

==== Appeal ====
As the Scottish FA's annual meeting was to take place on the following Tuesday, Rangers raised the matter afresh. Thoams Vallance, representing Rangers as club captain, claimed that the umpires had misidentified Struthers for another player who had not played the ball, and James Watt of Rangers questioned apparent bias from the officials, who had warned the Vale when time was approaching, as well as an assumption that the replay would not take place as Queen's Park had arranged a match with Glasgow University at the same time. The meeting chairman, Colquhoun of Lennox, who was one of the umpires, had to scotch rumours that he had money on the game, and that, unlike a Vale protest the previous year, the Rangers protest was on fact, not the laws of the game.

The repercussions rumbled on, with a call for a public subscription to give Rangers a trophy, or for the Vale to relinquish its title voluntarily and play afresh. However the Vale had its name engraved on the trophy within a week.

== Glasgow Charity Cup ==
Rangers however did not have to wait long for revenge and a genuine cup of its own - the two clubs met in the final of the Glasgow Charity Cup on 20 May 1879, again at Hampden, and, although McDougall headed the Vale into the lead after just two minutes, Rangers fought back with goals from Struthers and a controversial goal awarded after Parlane mishandled a Struthers shot against the post, and the umpires ruled it had gone behind the line before being smuggled out of goal; the decision saw the Vale players "excitedly gathered around the umpires after the decision was given, and seemed anxious to make them reconsider". In the final minute, Parlane, who had advanced upfield, was charged by a considerably lighter Rangers forward, and Parlane took enough exception to this to kick his prostrate opponent, causing a brief pitch invasion. Despite the brouhaha, the teams dined together that evening at the Athole Arms hotel.

Perhaps inevitably, the Vale protested against the second goal, and the protest was dismissed. In effect honour was satisfied; Rangers had proved its point by beating the Vale for the first time, both teams had a trophy, and the Scottish FA had proved its neutrality by deciding both protests on the same grounds.
