= List of Scottish Gaelic–speaking people =

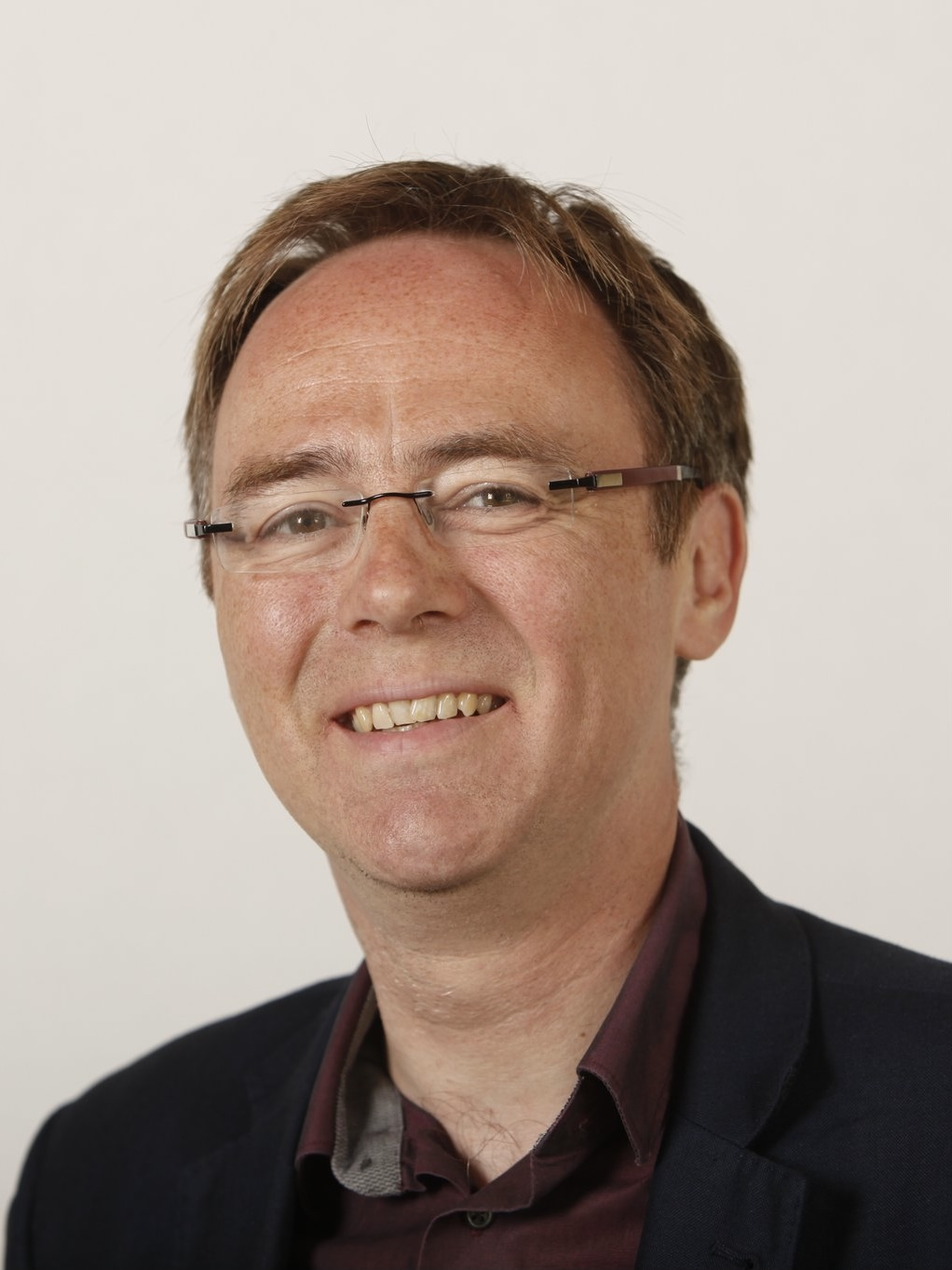
Alasdair Allan

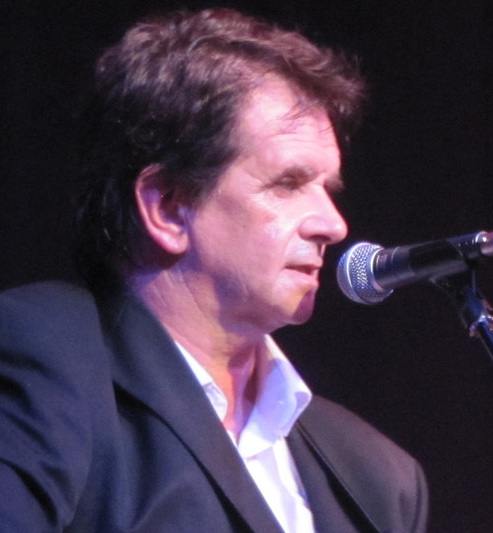
Donnie Munro

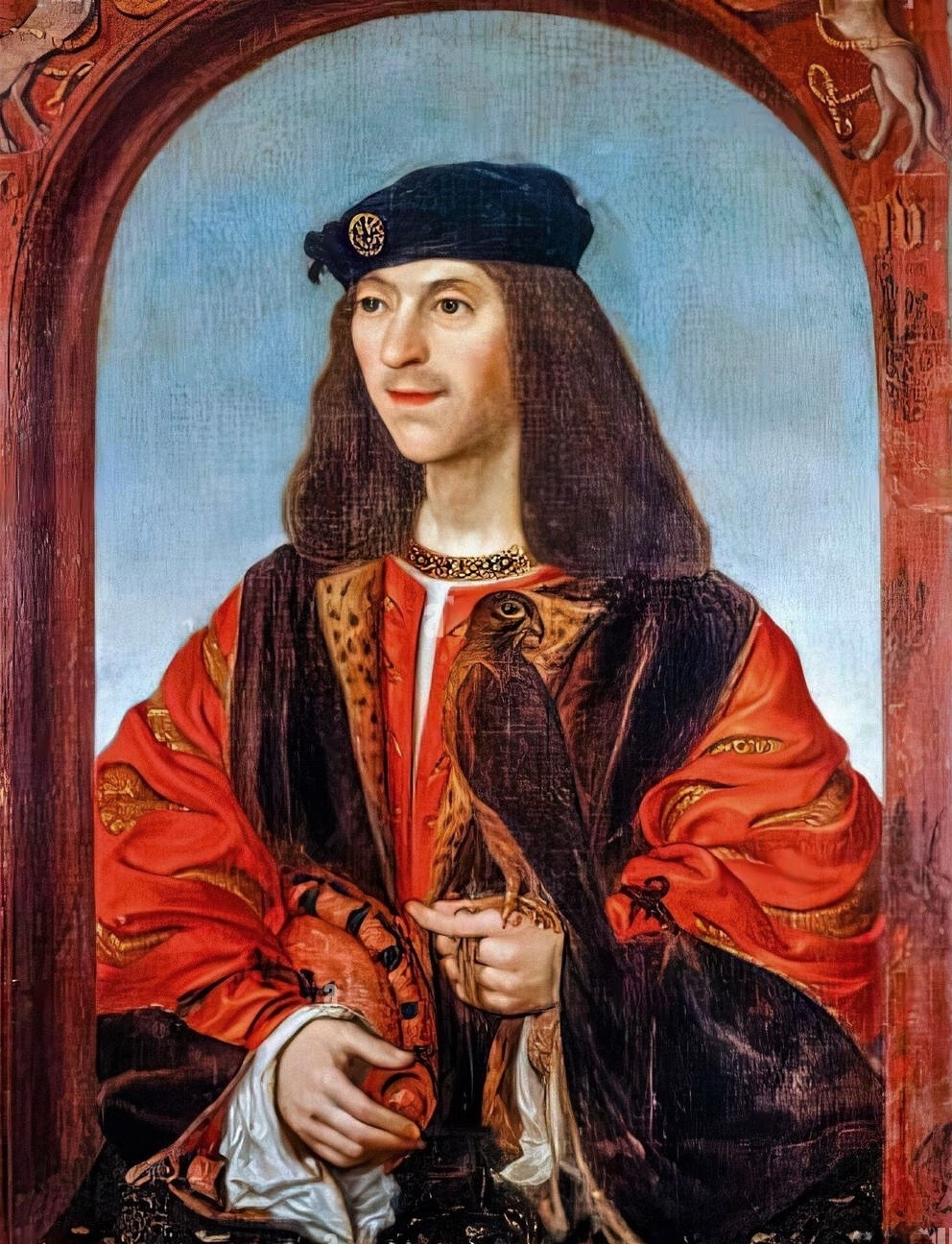
James IV of Scotland

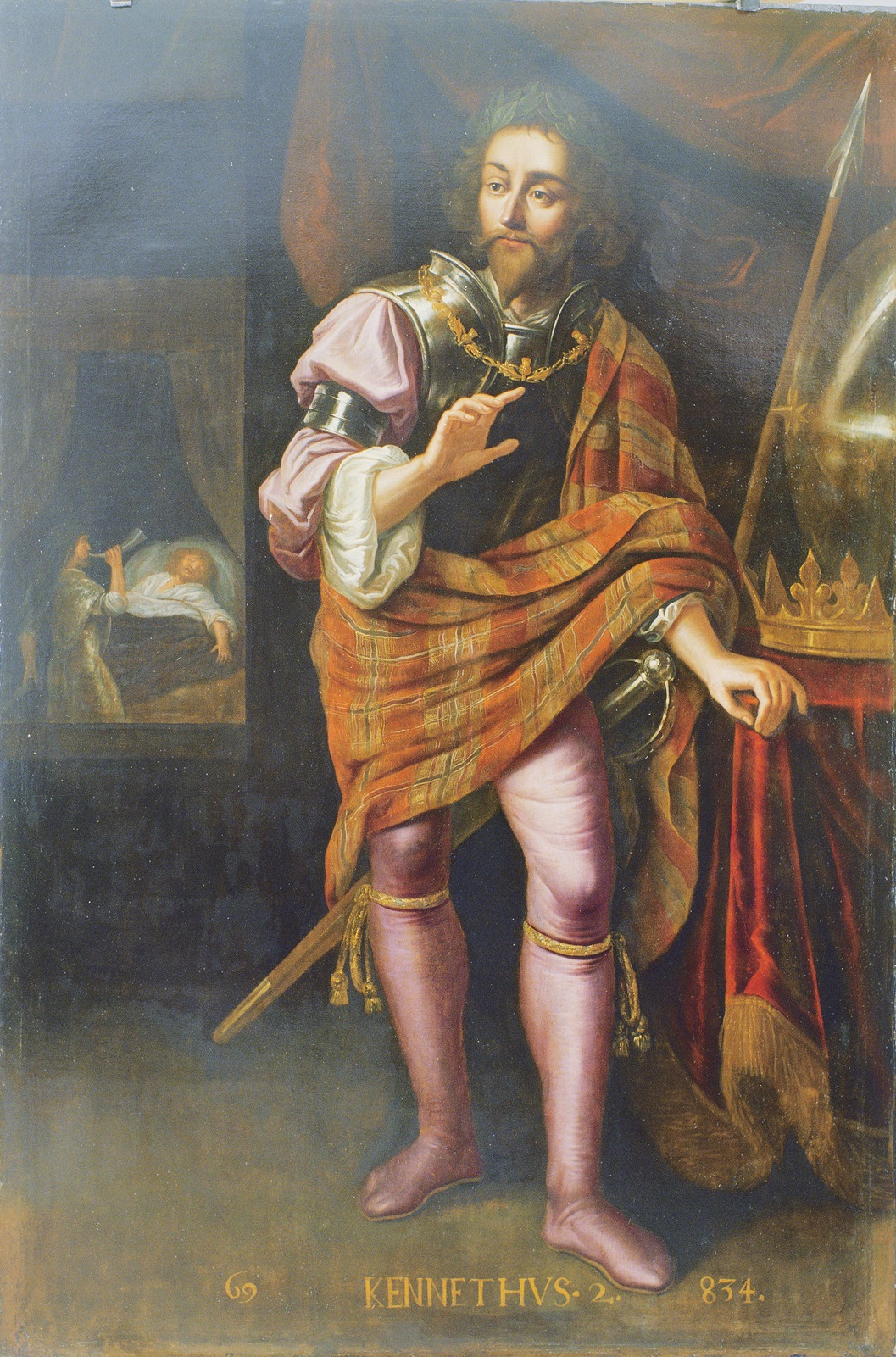
Kenneth MacAlpin

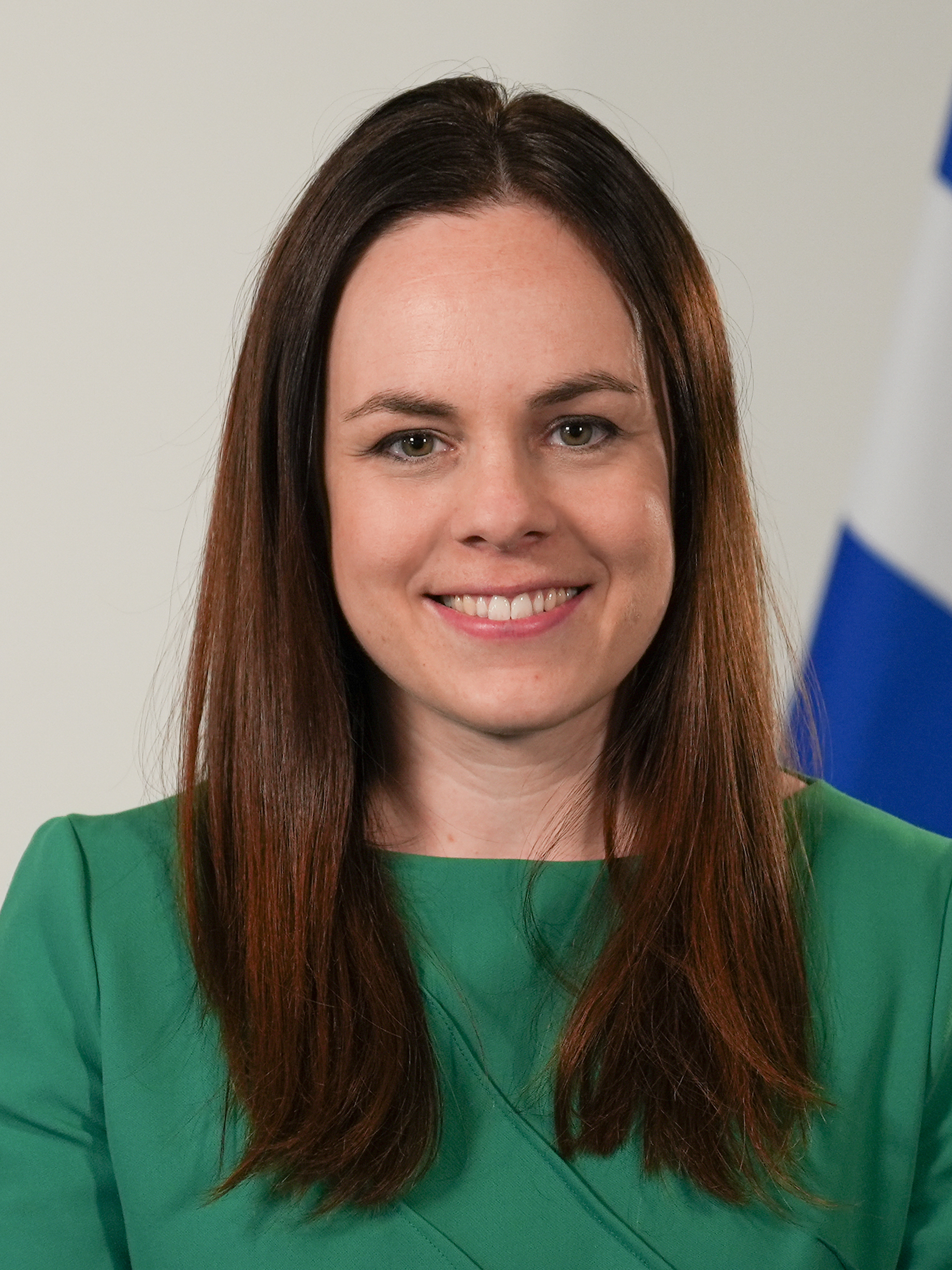
Kate Forbes

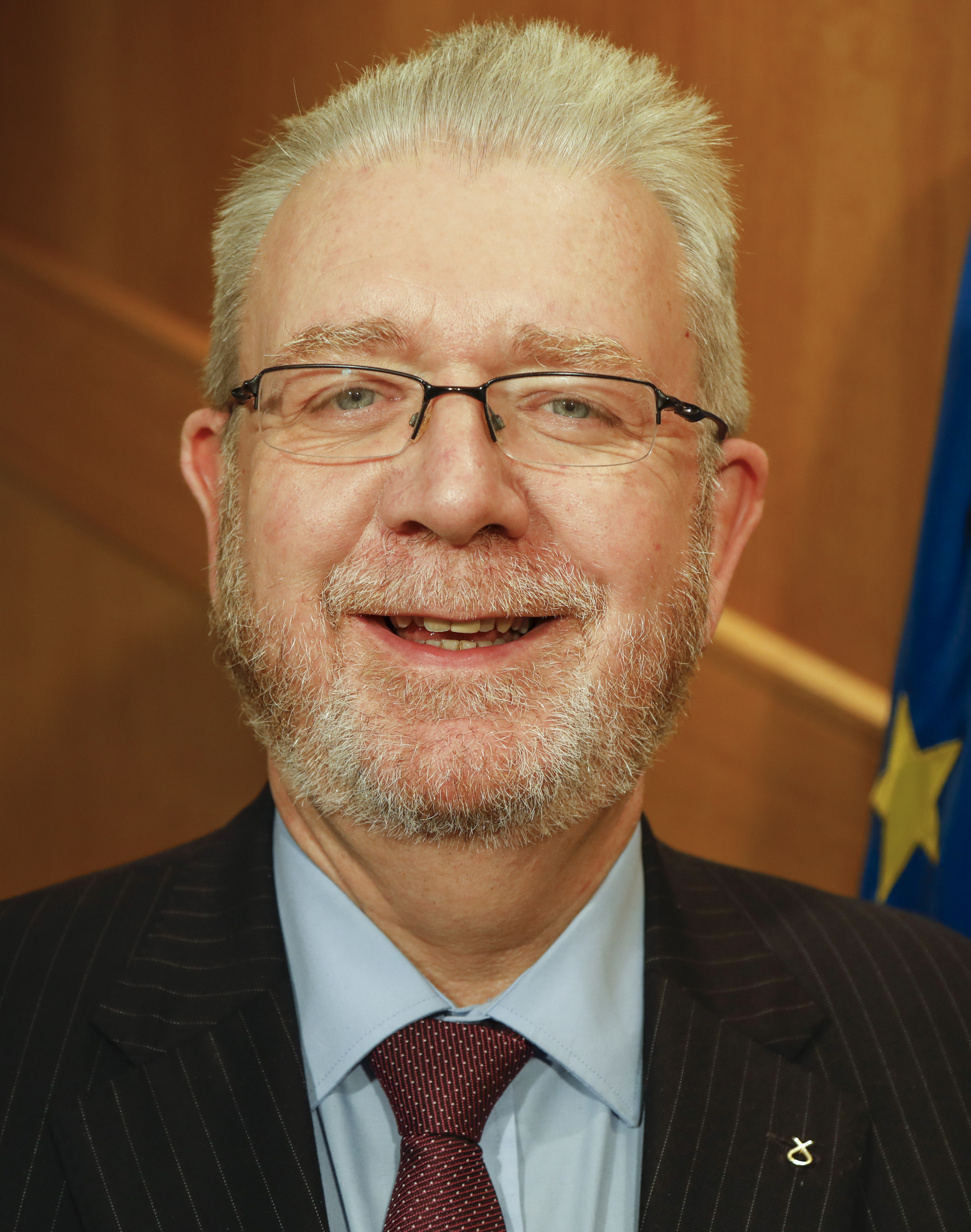
Michael Russell

Some notable fluent Scottish Gaelic language speakers

This page lists biographies of notable people who speak or spoke the Scottish Gaelic language with some degree of fluency, but not necessarily as native speakers. In 1891, over 254,000 people in Scotland spoke Scottish Gaelic, however, by 2011, it had fallen to just over 57,000. Largely in part due to Scottish Government policy initiatives, the number of speakers has increased, with the 2022 Scottish census recording over 69,000 speakers.

== List ==
- Alasdair Allan
- Ewen Bain
- John Bannerman, Baron Bannerman of Kildonan
- Meg Bateman (born 1959)
- Brahan Seer
- John Brown (servant)
- Marjorie, Countess of Carrick
- George Buchanan
- Angus Peter Campbell
- Maoilios Caimbeul
- Charles Muir Campbell
- John Francis Campbell
- John Lorne Campbell
- Peter Campbell (Rangers footballer)
- Kyle Carey
- Alexander Carmichael
- Séon Carsuel
- Donald Caskie
- Sìleas na Ceapaich
- Dòmhnall Ruadh Chorùna
- Arthur Cormack
- Iain Crichton Smith
- A. J. Cronin
- Rob Donn
- Joy Dunlop
- Edward Dwelly
- Elizabeth I
- Ruaraidh Erskine
- Adam Ferguson
- Calum Ferguson
- Christiana Fergusson
- Tommy Flanagan (actor)
- Kate Forbes
- Julie Fowlis
- Charles Fraser-Mackintosh
- Gillebríghde Albanach
- Anne Lorne Gillies
- Ewen Gillies
- John Gregorson Campbell
- George Campbell Hay
- Ewen Henderson (musician)
- George Henderson (scholar)
- James IV of Scotland
- Tony Kearney
- Calum Kennedy
- John Kennedy of Dingwall
- Mary Ann Kennedy (Scottish singer)
- Walter Kennedy (poet)
- Robert Kirk (folklorist)
- Mary Jane Lamond
- Johann Lamont
- David Livingstone
- Iain Lom
- Simon Fraser of Lovat
- Iain Mac Fhearchair
- Artúr Dall Mac Gurcaigh
- Donald MacAlister
- Kenneth MacAlpin
- Ishbel MacAskill
- Hugh MacColl
- Malcolm MacColl
- Allan MacDonald (poet)
- Calum MacDonald (musician)
- Calum MacDonald (politician)
- Cathy MacDonald
- Flora MacDonald
- Hector MacDonald
- John of Islay, Earl of Ross
- John A. Macdonald
- Kirsteen MacDonald
- Niall Iain MacDonald
- Rory Macdonald (musician)
- Murdo Macfarlane
- Walter Scott MacFarlane
- Tormod MacGill-Eain
- Gregor MacGregor
- Ewen MacLachlan
- Kathleen MacInnes
- Maggie MacInnes
- David Lowe MacIntyre
- Duncan Ban MacIntyre
- Alexander Mackenzie (politician)
- Alexander Mackenzie (explorer)
- Fiona J. Mackenzie
- James Mckenzie (outlaw)
- Neil Mackinnon
- Jessie MacLachlan
- Christian Maclagan
- Alistair MacLean
- Iain MacLean (journalist)
- Sorley MacLean
- Hugh Dan MacLennan
- Calum MacLeod (cricketer)
- Donald MacLeod (pipe major)
- Norman Macleod (journalist)
- Alasdair mac Mhaighstir Alasdair
- Aonghas MacNeacail
- Angus MacNeil
- Flora MacNeil
- Catherine-Ann MacPhee
- MacQueen of Findhorn
- Donnchadh MacRath
- Samuel Liddell MacGregor Mathers
- Hans Matheson
- Karen Matheson
- John Mathieson (surveyor)
- John and George Maxwell
- William McBeath
- Andy McCombie
- Thomas Robert McInnes
- John McKenzie (footballer, born 1925)
- Neil McLennan
- Norman McLeod (minister)
- Margaret McMurray
- Moses McNeil
- Peter McNeil
- Ray Michie, Baroness Michie of Gallanach
- Alexander Montgomerie
- James Graham, 7th Duke of Montrose
- Alasdair Morrison (politician)
- Donald Morrison (outlaw)
- Donnie Munro
- John Munro (poet)
- John Farquhar Munro
- Neil Munro (writer)
- Derek Murray (sports presenter)
- William Neill (poet)
- Iain Noble
- Àdhamh Ó Broin
- Niall O'Gallagher
- James Adolphus Oughton
- John Ross (missionary)
- Michael Russell (politician)
- Thomas Douglas, 5th Earl of Selkirk
- Donald Stewart (Scottish politician)
- John Roy Stewart
- Derick Thomson
- Mary Anne MacLeod Trump
- William J. Watson
- Brian Wilson (Labour politician)
