= 1877–78 in Scottish football =

Football in Scotland
- Season: 1877–78

1877–78 in Scottish football

Scottish Cup winners
- Vale of Leven

The 1877–78 season was the fifth season of competitive football in Scotland. This season saw the first playing of the Ayrshire Cup.

== Scottish Cup ==
Winner	Score	Runner-up
Vale of Leven	1–0	3rd Lanark RV

== County honours ==
Competition	Winner	Score	Runner-up
Ayrshire Cup	Mauchline	4–3	Kilmarnock Portland
Edinburgh FA Cup	Heart of Midlothian	3–2	Hibernian

== Other honours ==
Competition	Winner	Score	Runner-up
Glasgow Charity Cup	Queen's Park	1–0	Vale of Leven

== Scotland national team ==
Date	Venue	Opponents	Score	Competition	Scotland scorers
2 March 1878	Hampden Park, Glasgow	England	7–2	Friendly	John McDougall (3), John McGregor, Henry McNeil (2), Billy MacKinnon
23 March 1878	Hampden Park, Glasgow	Wales	9–0	Friendly	Peter Campbell (2), Jerry Weir (2), John Ferguson (2), John Campbell Baird, James Watson, Jimmy Lang
