= 1877 Scottish Cup final =

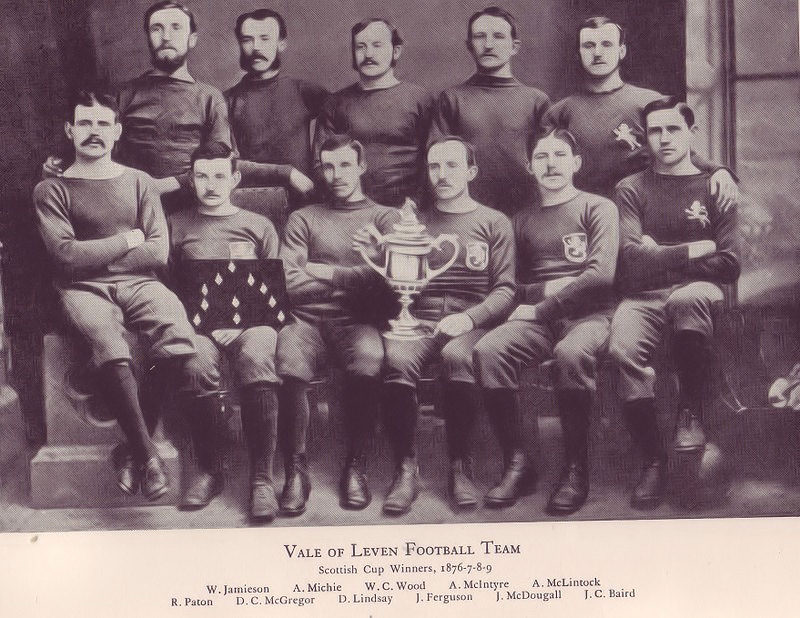
- The winning Vale of Leven team with the trophy
- Event: 1876–77 Scottish Cup
Vale of Leven	Rangers
1	1
- Date: 17 March 1877
- Venue: Hamilton Crescent, Partick
- Referee: James Kerr
- Attendance: 8,000

Replay
Vale of Leven	Rangers
1	1
- Date: 7 April 1877
- Venue: Hamilton Crescent, Partick
- Referee: James Kerr
- Attendance: 14,000

Second replay
Vale of Leven	Rangers
3	2
- Date: 13 April 1877
- Venue: Hampden Park, Crosshill
- Referee: James Kerr
- Attendance: 7,500

The 1877 Scottish Cup final was the fourth final of the Scottish Cup and the final of the 1876–77 Scottish Cup, the most prestigious knockout football competition in Scotland. The original match took place at Hamilton Crescent on 17 March 1877 and was contested by Vale of Leven and Rangers. The match was the first final to require two replays to decide a winner.

The original match ended in a 1–1 draw. Robert Paton opened the scoring for Vale of Leven, but Rangers equalised courtesy of an own goal from John McDougall. In the replay three weeks later, McDougall evened the scores for Vale of Leven after William Dunlop had opened the scoring for Rangers to force a second replay. In what turned out to be the decider, an early own goal from Jimmy Watson and two late goals from John Campbell Baird and Paton were enough to seal a narrow 3–2 victory for Vale of Leven to win the tournament for the first time. This was the first time the cup had been won by a team other than Queen's Park.

== Background ==
This was the first final not to feature Queen's Park – who had won all three previous tournaments – after they were defeated by Vale of Leven in the quarter-finals. It was both Vale of Leven's and Rangers' début appearance in the Scottish Cup final.

Vale of Leven's previous best run in the competition saw them reach the semi-finals in 1875–76 before losing to eventual winners Queen's Park. Rangers had never made it beyond the second round before reaching the 1877 final.

The tie also marked the first competitive meetings of Rangers and Vale of Leven.

== Route to the final ==
Both clubs entered the competition in the first round. Rangers won all of their matches before the final at the first attempt. However, the club received two byes through the duration of the tournament, one in the third round and one in the semi-final. Vale of Leven played in all rounds and also won all of their ties without needing a replay, conceding only one goal in the process.

=== Vale of Leven ===
Round	Opposition	Score
First round	Helensburgh	1–0
Second round	Vale of Leven Rovers	7–0
Third round	3rd Lanark RV	1–0
Fourth round	Busby	4–0
Quarter-final	Queen's Park	2–1
Semi-final	Ayr Thistle	9–0

In the competition's early years, the first few rounds were regionalised so Vale of Leven were drawn at home to fellow Dunbartonshire club Helensburgh in the first round. They began the competition with a tightly contested match at North Street Park, Alexandria on 30 September 1876 which they won 1–0. In the second round they faced local rivals Vale of Leven Rovers at the same venue, winning comfortably 7–0. The third round saw another tightly contested match as Vale defeated 3rd Lanark RV 1–0 at North Street Park before they eliminated Busby with a 4–0 home win in the fourth round. That set up a historic quarter-final with three-time defending champions Queen's Park at Hampden Park. Vale of Leven became the first team to defeat Queen's Park in the competition's history, ending their stranglehold on the trophy in the process, after winning 2–1 on 30 December 1876. The aftermath of the victory was marred by tense exchanges between the two clubs – whose representatives had already fallen out over arranging a friendly a year earlier – regarding the alleged use of illegal spiked boots by the Vale of Leven players (local businessmen made attempts to resolve this in a positive manner with the creation of the Glasgow Merchants Charity Cup, but the Alexandria club refused to participate in its first year in a further dispute over gate receipt sharing). Two weeks later, Vale eased into the final, thumping Ayr Thistle 9–0 in the semi-final at the neutral Kinning Park.

=== Rangers ===
Round	Opposition	Score
First round	Queen's Park Juniors	4–1
Second round	Towerhill	8–0
Third round	bye	
Fourth round	Mauchline	3–0
Quarter-final	Dumbarton	3–0
Semi-final	bye	

Rangers began the competition with a 4–1 win against Queen's Park Juniors at Kinning Park on 30 September 1876. In the second round, Dunlop, Watson, Marshall and Campbell all scored twice as they recorded an 8–0 home win against Towerhill. Rangers were then given a bye in the third round. They faced Ayrshire side Mauchline in the fourth round, winning 3–0 at Kinning Park thanks to goals from Watson, Marshall and Campbell. Dunbartonshire side Lennox were their opponents for the quarter-finals where goals from Dunlop, Marshall and Campbell were enough to see them through as 3–0 winners. With just three clubs reaching the semi-finals, Rangers were the lucky ones who received a bye to the final.

== Match details ==
=== Original ===
The match took place at the West of Scotland R.F.C. ground in Partick and attracted a crowd of as much as 10,000. coming in "an almost unbroken line of cabs, hansoms, 'buses, and machines of every description". The Vale was considered the favourites and kicked uphill in the first half, and Rangers took advantage of the slope to earn a series of early corners, but the only goal in the first half was scored by the Vale, McLintock centering a free-kick from the right wing - one of many awarded for handball - and Paton headed home. A McLintock corner in the second half nearly led to Vale doubling its lead, the ball bouncing off the top of the bar, but Rangers equalized in a mass scrimmage from a throw-in, the Rangers forwards able to force the ball between the posts. McIntyre was picked out as the best of the Leven backs, while the Rangers back duo of Vallance and Gillespie were considered to have been remarkable even by their high standards.

17 March 1877
15:00

Vale of Leven	1–1	Rangers
Paton 10'		McDougall 65' (o.g.)

Hamilton Crescent, Partick
Attendance: 8,000
Referee: James Kerr (Hamilton)

Vale of Leven	Rangers

VALE OF LEVEN:
GK	(Scotland) William Wood
FB	(Scotland) Andrew McIntyre
FB	(Scotland) Archie Michie
HB	(Scotland) Will Jamieson
HB	(Scotland) Alex McLintock
FW	(Scotland) John Ferguson (c)
FW	(Scotland) John McGregor
FW	(Scotland) David Lindsay
FW	(Scotland) Robert Paton
FW	(Scotland) John McDougall
FW	(Scotland) John Baird

RANGERS:
GK	(Scotland) James Watt
FB	(Scotland) Tom Vallance (c)
FB	(Scotland) George Gillespie
HB	(Scotland) Sam Ricketts
HB	(Scotland) William McNeil
FW	(Scotland) Moses McNeil
FW	(Scotland) Peter Campbell
FW	(Scotland) James Watson
FW	(Scotland) Alex Marshall
FW	(Scotland) William Dunlop
FW	(Scotland) David Hill

The teams were unchanged for the two replays.

=== Replay ===
The replay took place at the same venue and again ended in a draw. The crowd was even greater, the tramway company putting on special services. This time the Vale won the toss and elected to kick downhill from the north goal, but, as before, Rangers took the initiative, and this time took the lead, after just 7 minutes; Gillespie sent a free-kick for handball into the goalmouth, and, after Vallance had tried to force the ball through, it came back to Dunlop, who put the ball just under the bar. Vale retaliated with a Baird shot that went wide by a foot, and, just after the second half started, with rain starting to fall, some neat passing between the Vale forwards presented Baird with a chance he could not miss. Rangers generally had the balance of play in the second half, and, after 90 minutes ended with the score 1–1, the clubs agreed to play two 15 minute periods of extra time. Soon after the start of the second period, Rangers claimed a goal after a goalbound shot crashed off the bar and was punted out by Wood, which caused a pitch invasion of delighted fans, but the umpires agreed the ball had not crossed the line.

7 April 1877
15:00

Vale of Leven	1–1	Rangers
Baird 47'		Dunlop 7'

Hamilton Crescent, Partick
Attendance: 15,000
Referee: James Kerr (Hamilton)

=== Second replay ===
The teams were finally separated at the third time of asking, on a cool but dry Friday evening. There was some ill-feeling because of the disallowed goal in the previous match, and "it is to be regretted...that two of the players [McNeil and Baird] should have quarrelled during the match, and that a Vale of Leven man [Baird] should have so far forgot himself as to kick one of the Rangers wilfully...we hope never to see the same repeated," although the players later shook hands on the incident. The ill-feeling extended to the mostly-Glaswegian crowd, accused of behaving "as if they were a party of Bashi Bazouks of the most blood-thirsty type". Again handball was "painfully frequent" and the play "not as pretty" as in the earlier matches.

The Vale, wearing a change strip of white jerseys, won the toss again, so chose to have the wind behind it in the first half. Vale took the lead when Watson, trying to clear his goal, mis-headed it past a despairing Watt. Shortly afterwards, a Vallance free-kick went just under the Vale bar, but, at the time, all free-kicks were indirect, and no goal was awarded. Rangers equalized soon after the start of the second half, thanks to a comedy of errors in the Vale defence - a long shot from Campbell was mis-kicked by Wood, who had come out of his goal; McLintock rushed back to clear it, but, seeing McIntyre behind him, hesitated, and McIntyre, perhaps distracted, missed his kick as well, the ball slowly going into the Vale goal. Soon afterwards McNeil made it 2–1 to the Light Blues when the ball ran loose from a scrimmage. Baird equalized for Vale after a McLintock "place-kick" put the ball in the goalmouth, and Vale won the Cup thanks in part to another McLintock free-kick; Ferguson, Baird, and Paton being on the end of it and working the ball between themselves before Paton found a gap between the backs, and "sent the ball flying past Watt".

13 April 1877
15:00

Vale of Leven	3–2	Rangers
Watson 15' (o.g.); Baird 70'; Paton 88'		P. Campbell 47'; W. McNeil 50'

Hampden Park, Crosshill
Attendance: 12,000
Referee: James Kerr (Hamilton)

== Aftermath ==
The Vale was welcomed back to Alexandria by a crowd of 3–4,000, who had been keeping tabs on the match via telegrams sent to the post office, and the players paraded around Main Street and the town centre fountain, serenaded by pipes and rockets.

One sour point was that the Vale withdrew from the Glasgow Charity Cup because of "that most outrageous and unfair reception given to our team...it is hard enough to play a football match and to win it before fair spectators, but to play a match for a public benefit to those who hurl at you only the lowest epithets is doubly hard, and to win it, almost impossible."
