= Alexander McLintock =

Alexander McLintock may refer to:

- Alex McLintock (1853–1931), Scottish footballer
- Alexander Hare McLintock (1903–1968), New Zealand teacher, university lecturer, historian and artist
