= Lancelot F.C. =

Football club in Glasgow, Scotland (1874–1878)

Lancelot
- Full name: Lancelot Football Club
- Founded: 1874
- Dissolved: 1878
- Ground: Glasgow Green
- Secretary: Arthur Herriot Jr

Lancelot Football Club was a Scottish football club based in the city of Glasgow.

== History ==
The club was formed in 1874 out of a cricket club, which dated back to 1869 and played on Glasgow Green, with bowler John Haddow being noted as a strong forward, and batsman Flett also praised for his play. The is at least one reference to the club under the name Launcelot.

Its first reported matches took place in November 1874. The club's earliest recorded win was a 1–0 triumph against fellow Glaswegian club Rovers, who were Scottish Cup quarter-finalists in successive seasons.

Lancelot entered the Cup for the only time in 1875–76. In the first round, the club was drawn away to Towerhill, and lost 2–0, with a third goal disputed, in a poor performance which saw the club only draw one save out of the opposing goalkeeper. The following week the club played Thornliebank in one of the latter's first fixtures. Later in the season the club beat the young Hamilton Academical 2–0.

The club's friendly match with Crosshill in November 1875 may have seen the first use of a substitute in a match; one of the Lancelot players was injured and Crosshill "allow[ed] them to put a fresh man in his place".

The club remained comparatively active until 1878, although it did not enter the Scottish Cup again, as in 1877 the Scottish Football Association turned down membership requests from clubs which did not have private grounds. The club therefore joined a new organization for these clubs - the West of Scotland Football Association - and entered the West of Scotland Cup, a competition for the clubs excluded by the Scottish FA. The club's only match in the competition was a 2–0 defeat to the Camden club of Glasgow.

At the start of the 1877–78 season Lancelot was one of the Cowlairs club's first opponents, playing out a 1–1 draw. The club was still able to run two XIs during the season, but the final record of any Lancelot matches is for the second XI against Clutha Rangers at the end of the season; the records for the cricket club end in 1875. There is a one-off defeat to the obscure Maybank F.C. in 1885 but this presumably refers to a separate club for which there are no other records.

== Ground ==
In common with a number of other Glasgow clubs, the club used the Glasgow Green whenever hosting matches.
