= Robert Paton (footballer) =

Scottish footballer

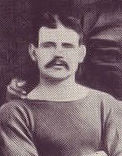
- Paton with Vale of Leven in 1877.

Personal information
- Date of birth: c. 1854
- Place of birth: Bonhill, Scotland
- Date of death: 17 February 1905 (aged 51)
- Place of death: Bonhill, Scotland
- Position: Forward

Senior career*
Years	Team	Apps	(Gls)
- Vale of Leven

International career
1879	Scotland	2	(0)
- * Club domestic league appearances and goals

Robert Paton (c. 1854 – 17 February 1905) was a Scottish footballer who played as a forward.

== Career ==
Born in Bonhill, Paton played club football for Vale of Leven, and made two appearances for Scotland in 1879. He was a founder member of Vale of Leven and was part of the team that won the Scottish Cup in 1877, scoring the winning goal in the final's second replay. He was still with the club when they retained the trophy in 1878 and 1879, but he did not take part in either of those finals. According to historical records of Queen's Park, Paton was the first player ever to score against the Glasgow club in January 1875.

== Personal life ==
Some publications assert that Daniel Paton, also an international from the same neighbourhood, was his brother, but this was found to be incorrect.
