= Seachd Là =

Scottish Gaelic-language TV news magazine

Production
- Producer: BBC Naidheachdan
- Production locations: Studio G, Inverness, Scotland
- Running time: 55 minutes

Original release
- Network: BBC Alba
- Release: 28 September 2008 – present

Seachd Là (Seven Days) is a weekly Scottish Gaelic-language news programme produced by BBC Alba, featuring a round up of the week's news. Its stories are from BBC Alba's news programmes An Là and Eòrpa. It is shown on Sundays from the BBC Alba studio in Inverness.

== See also ==
- An Là
