= Jordanhill F.C. =

Former association football club in Scotland

Jordanhill
- Full name: Jordanhill Football Club
- Founded: 1875
- Dissolved: 1882
- Ground: Anniesland Park
- Secretary: John Rowan
Home colours

Jordanhill Football Club was a 19th-century association football club based at Jordanhill, now in Glasgow.

== History ==
The club was founded in 1875. In the 1876–77 season, the club claimed to have won 16 and drawn 2 of its 18 matches, but none seems to have been reported, with the only opponents recorded for the club being the obscure Smithfield club.

Perhaps emboldened by this record against the smaller clubs, Jordanhill the Scottish Cup for the first time in the following season. In the first round Jordanhill beat Queen's Park Juniors 1–0, in the second beat Lenzie 2–1, and in the third beat Grasshoppers of Bonnybridge 4–0, with goals from Fleming, Morrison, club secretary Rowan, and "off one of the Grasshoppers' backs"; every time the club had been drawn at home.

The club was even luckier with the fourth round draw, being the only team to receive a bye, but in the fifth round (last 12) the club's luck ran out - it was drawn away to Vale of Leven, who would go on to win the competition. Jordanhill were "outmatched from the first", only the goalkeeping of Fleming and defensive play of Smith keeping the score down to 10.

1877–78 was the only time the club got past the second round. Jordanhill continued to enter until 1882–83, its final tie in the competition being a 4–0 defeat at home to Rangers. The last reference to a Jordanhill match is from November 1882.

== Colours ==
The club's colours were originally black and white jerseys and hose. In 1880 the club changed to white shirts and navy shorts, and in 1882 changed its shirts to navy.

== Ground ==
The club had a private ground at Anniesland Park, a mile from the Botanic and Partick Car stops.
