= John Hunter (Third Lanark footballer) =

Scottish footballer (1854–1881)

Jack Hunter
Personal information
- Full name: John Hunter
- Date of birth: 1854
- Place of birth: Coylton, Scotland
- Date of death: 2 November 1881 (aged 26–27)
- Place of death: Ayr, Scotland
- Position: Full back

Senior career*
Years	Team	Apps	(Gls)
1873–1875	Third Lanark		
1875	Eastern		
1875–1878	Third Lanark		

International career
1874–1877	Scotland	4	(0)
- * Club domestic league appearances and goals

John Hunter (1854 – 2 November 1881) was a Scottish footballer who played for Third Lanark, Glasgow Eastern and Scotland (four caps). He played on the losing side in the Scottish Cup finals of 1876 and 1878, and made several representative appearances for Glasgow. After retiring as a player, Hunter coached Linthouse.

His younger brothers Archie and Andy both played for Aston Villa, Archie being one of the club's most noted early players.

== See also ==
- List of Scottish football families
