= William Miller (1870s footballer) =

Scottish footballer

Personal information
- Date of death: May 1894
- Position: Right winger

Senior career*
Years	Team	Apps	(Gls)
- Third Lanark

International career
1876	Scotland	1	(0)
- * Club domestic league appearances and goals

William Miller (died May 1894) was a Scottish footballer who played as a right winger.

== Career ==
Miller played club football for Third Lanark, and made one appearance for Scotland in 1876. He was one of the "founding fathers" of Third Lanark and was runner-up with them in the Scottish Cup finals of 1876 and 1878.
