= An Là =

Scottish Gaelic-language news programme

- Title card used since 2022
- Country of origin: United Kingdom (Scotland)
- Original language: Scottish Gaelic (although some English is used in this programme)

Production
- Producers: BBC Naidheachdan; BBC Scotland
- Production locations: Studio G, Inverness, Scotland (News), Pacific Quay, Glasgow, Scotland (Weather and other reports)
- Running time: 30 minutes (25 minutes Fridays, 15 minutes Weekends)

Original release
- Network: BBC Alba
- Release: 22 September 2008 – present

Related
- Seachd Là; Eòrpa; Reporting Scotland

An Là (The Day) is a Scottish Gaelic-language news programme broadcast on BBC Alba and produced by BBC Naidheachdan (BBC News) and BBC Scotland.

The programme, based at BBC Alba's newsroom in Inverness, began at 8pm on 22 September 2008 and provides a 30-minute bulletin of Scottish, British and international news for Gaelic speakers seven days a week. The Sunday night review programme, composed of highlights from the week's bulletins as well as material from Eòrpa, called Seachd Là, began at 6.30pm on 28 September 2008.

== Broadcast history ==
An Là broadcasts from Studio G at the BBC Alba studio in Inverness alongside Seachd Là and An Là Sports (BBC Spòrs). An Là Weather (BBC Aimsir) comes from BBC Pacific Quay in Glasgow.

An Là is the first daily television news programme to be broadcast in Scots Gaelic since the axing of Grampian Television's Telefios bulletins in 2000. When the show first aired, it was only presented by two presenters taking turns presenting daily. It is currently presented by the current team below.

An Là was shortlisted in the Best Current Affairs category at the 2009 Celtic Media Festival.

== Presenters ==
=== News presenters ===
Person	Position
Angela MacLean	Main Presenters
Donald Morrison	Main Presenters
Karen Elder	Main Presenters
Innes Munro	Main Presenters
Mairi Rodgers	Main Presenters
Andrew MacKinnon	Relief Presenters
Anne McAlpine	Relief Presenters
Iain Macinnes	Relief Presenters
Ruairidh MacLennan	Relief Presenters
Eilidh Grant	Relief Presenters
Eilidh Mackay	Relief Presenters
Iain MacLean	Relief Presenters

=== Weather presenters ===
Person	Position
Derek MacIntosh	Main Presenters
Sarah Cruickshank	Main Presenters
Kirsteen MacDonald	Relief Presenters
Joy Dunlop	Relief Presenters
Anne McAlpine	Relief Presenters
Alasdair Fraser	Relief Presenters

=== Sports presenters ===
Person	Position
Alasdair MacLennan	Main Presenters
Calum Macaulay	Main Presenters
Javen Houston	Relief Presenters
Ruairidh MacLennan	Relief Presenters
Donald Morrison	Relief Presenters
Allan MacLeod	Relief Presenters

=== Reporters ===
Scottish Parliament

- Niall O'Gallagher (politics)

== See also ==
- Seachd Là
- Telefios
