= Moses McNeil =

Scottish footballer

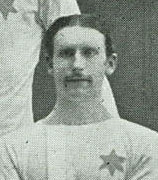

Personal information
- Full name: Moses McLay McNeil
- Date of birth: 29 October 1855
- Place of birth: Belmore, Garelochside, Scotland
- Date of death: 9 April 1938 (aged 82)
- Place of death: Dumbarton, Scotland
- Position: Outside forward

Senior career*
Years	Team	Apps	(Gls)
1872–1882	Rangers		

International career
1876–1880	Scotland	2	(0)
- * Club domestic league appearances and goals

Moses McNeil (29 October 1855 – 9 April 1938) was a Scottish footballer who was one of the founding members of Rangers Football Club. He played as an outside forward.

== Early life ==
Moses McLay McNeil was born on the 29 October 1855, at Belmore, Garelochside; now the location of the HMNB Clyde Naval Base at Faslane.

His father was John McNeil (Master Gardner) from Comrie, Perthshire and his mother was Jean Lowdon Bain from Downpatrick, County Down. They were married in Glasgow 1839. When born, he had seven brothers and two sisters.

== Club career ==
McNeil, along with fellow founding members Peter McNeil (his brother) and friends William McBeath and Peter Campbell, adopted the name Rangers, reportedly from an English rugby annual. Rangers played their first ever match against Callander F.C. at Glasgow Green's Flesher's Haugh in May 1872, which resulted in a 0–0 draw. Rangers played one more match in 1872, an 11–0 win against a team called Clyde (not the surviving Clyde F.C.).

In 1874 Rangers played their first-ever Scottish Cup match, and McNeil scored in a 2–0 win over Oxford, but Rangers lost to Dumbarton in the second round. Rangers reached their first Scottish Cup final in 1877 but lost to Vale of Leven after two replays.

McNeil's Rangers reached the Scottish Cup final again in 1879 but, after Rangers refused to play in the replay following a 1–1 draw at the first Hampden, the trophy was awarded to Vale of Leven. Rangers won their first trophy later in 1879: the Glasgow Merchants Charity Cup, after beating Vale of Leven 2–1 in front of 11,000 spectators at Hampden.

McNeil's last recorded appearance for Rangers was on 30 September 1882 in a Scottish Cup replay defeat to Queen's Park at Hampden Park. He made 34 Scottish Cup appearances and scored ten goals during his Rangers career.

== International career ==
McNeil won two caps for Scotland, the first on 25 March 1876 in a 4–0 win over Wales (the first international between the two countries) and the second on 13 March 1880 in a 5–4 win over England, in which he played alongside his brother, Henry. McNeil was the first Rangers player to play for Scotland and the club's first international footballer.

== Later life ==
After playing football, McNeil focused on his occupation as a Commercial Traveller. He never married and died of cardiac disease on 9 April 1938 at 50 Townend Road, Dumbarton, although his usual address was Craig Cottage at Clynder, Argyll and Bute, aged 82.

A plaque was laid at McNeil's grave, which is in St Modan's Parish Churchyard, Rosneath (near Helensburgh) on 30 June 2015, which reads "Moses McNeil 29th October 1855, 9th April 1938. A local man and founder of Rangers Football Club".
