= Iain MacLean (journalist) =

- Iain MacGilleEathain
- Education: University of Aberdeen
- Occupation: Journalist

Iain MacLean (Scottish Gaelic: Iain MacGilleEathain) is a Scottish-Gaelic speaking news anchor for BBC Scotland's Gaelic language news and current affairs programme, An Là, which broadcasts every weekday at 8pm on BBC Alba.

MacLean also made occasional appearances on other Gaelic language programmes, such as the BBC's Gaelic audience discussion programme Cunntas. He is a fully trained video journalist.

== Early life and education ==
He was born and raised in Harris and, although his father's family are from Liurbost in Lewis, he considers himself a Hearach (Harris person). MacLean has one brother and one sister; both are fluent Gaelic speakers.

He graduated in 2001 from the University of Aberdeen with a degree in Gaelic Studies and prior to working for An Là, was a regular presenter on BBC Radio nan Gàidheal's daily news programmes - Aithris na Maidne, Aithris an Fheasgair and Aithris na Seachdainn.
