= Crosshill F.C. =

Former association football club in Scotland

Crosshill
- Full name: Crosshill Football Club
- Founded: 1873
- Dissolved: 1877
- Ground: Kilmaining Park
- Secretary: A. McTavish
- Captain: L. Liddell
Home colours

Crosshill Football Club was a 19th-century football club based in Glasgow.

== History ==
The club was founded in 1873, under the name Woodbank. The club's first recorded match took place in September 1873, being a 0–0 draw against Queen's Park Juniors. Its first recorded win came the next year against the Regent Park, thanks to a George Munro hat-trick. The club was running two XIs by the end of the season.

The club changed its name to Crosshill in February or March 1875. Under the Crosshill name, the club entered the 1876–77 Scottish Cup, the only time it would enter the competition. In the first round, Crosshill won 2–1 at Hyde Park Locomotive Works of Cowlairs, with goals from Munro and club secretary McTavish. In the second round (last 41), the club drew 0–0 at home to Govan side Lancefield, but lost 2–0 in the replay.

Although there are references to a Crosshill club playing from the 1877–78 season onwards, this was a different club, the Crosshill Rangers, who had been active in 1876–77 using Queen's Park as its home. It seems the original Crosshill club had ceased operations after the 1876–77 season.

== Colours ==
The club played in white jerseys and knickers, and blue and white stockings.

== Grounds ==
The club originally played at Queen's Park. By 1876 it had moved to Kilmaining Park, in Old Cathcart, 100 yards from the Cathcart omnibus stop.
