= Kirsteen MacDonald =

Scottish weatherwoman (born 1982)

- Kirsteen NicDhòmhnaill
- Born: 18 December 1983 (age 41); Inverness, Scotland
- Occupation: Weather presenter
- Employer(s): BBC Scotland, BBC Alba
- Television: Reporting Scotland

Kirsteen MacDonald (Scottish Gaelic: Kirsteen NicDhòmhnaill) is a Scottish broadcaster.

MacDonald was born in Inverness, and educated at the Gaelic-medium unit at the city's Central Primary School, and at Millburn Academy.

She regularly presents the weather for BBC's Reporting Scotland and An Là.

MacDonald won the prestigious women's gold medal at the Royal National Mòd in 2006. In 2008, she had an operation to remove her appendix, shortly after her operation she entered the Mòd in Falkirk, where she won the women's traditional medal. MacDonald received the "Gaelic Ambassador of the Year Award" at the 2014 Royal National Mod.
