= William McBeath =

Scottish footballer and club founder

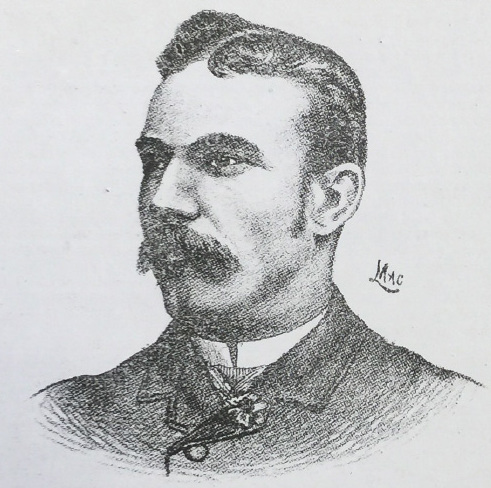

Personal information
- Full name: William McBeath
- Date of birth: 7 May 1856
- Place of birth: Callander, Scotland
- Date of death: 15 July 1917 (aged 61)
- Place of death: Lincoln, England
- Position: Defender

Senior career*
Years	Team	Apps	(Gls)
1872–1876	Rangers		
- * Club domestic league appearances and goals

William McBeath (7 May 1856 – 15 July 1917) was a Scottish footballer and one of the founding members of Rangers Football Club. He made five Scottish Cup appearances for the club.

== Early life ==
William McBeath was born in Callander, Perthshire on 7 May 1856; the third of four children to Peter and Jane McBeath (although the youngest child did not survive past infancy). McBeath also had a further four half-brothers and sisters from his father's previous relationships. At age eight, soon after the death of his father; William's mother moved with William and his older sister Jane to Glasgow, no doubt attracted by the rapidly expanding industrial city. The census of 1871 lists William, then aged fourteen, as an assistant salesman and living on Cleveland Street in the Sandyford area of Glasgow and close to five members of the McNeil family, two of whom would later join with McBeath and Peter Campbell to form Glasgow Rangers.

== Playing career ==
In 1872, McBeath along with three friends Peter Campbell (15), Peter McNeil (the oldest at 17) and Moses McNeil saw a group of men playing football on Glasgow Green's Flesher's Haugh. Indeed, the club's first game was played at Flesher's Haugh against a now-defunct Glasgow team named Callander, which resulted in a 0–0 draw. His exertions in the game were said to have been so great and taxing on his fitness, that he spent the next week 'laid up' in bed.

McBeath was listed in the Roll of Office Bearers as the first president of the club for the 1874–75 season. He played his last game for Rangers in November 1875 and left the club soon after.

== Private life ==
In 1878, at the age of 22, William McBeath married Jeannie Yates Harris (21). They had three children, William Duncanson McBeath (born 1880), Agnes Isabella (1882), Norman Douglas (1890). In 1881 the family had moved from Glasgow to Bristol; however some time after 1893 the family unit had collapsed and there is little or no trace of Jeannie and the young family, and preciously little of William (Sr).

A hard life began to befall William with accusation of fraud arising in 1896 which resulted in trial in 1897. He was cleared of falsely selling advertisements for a newspaper that was never distributed. He soon married in 1898, but this was most likely a bigamous marriage. as no evidence exists of a divorce.

William lived the majority of his later years in a Poorhouse in Lincoln, branded an "imbecile", although today he would have been probably diagnosed as suffering from Alzheimer's disease. McBeath died on Sunday 15 July 1917 aged 61; he had spent his last seven years in the poorhouse. He was buried in an unmarked grave in a Lincoln cemetery.

== Legacy ==
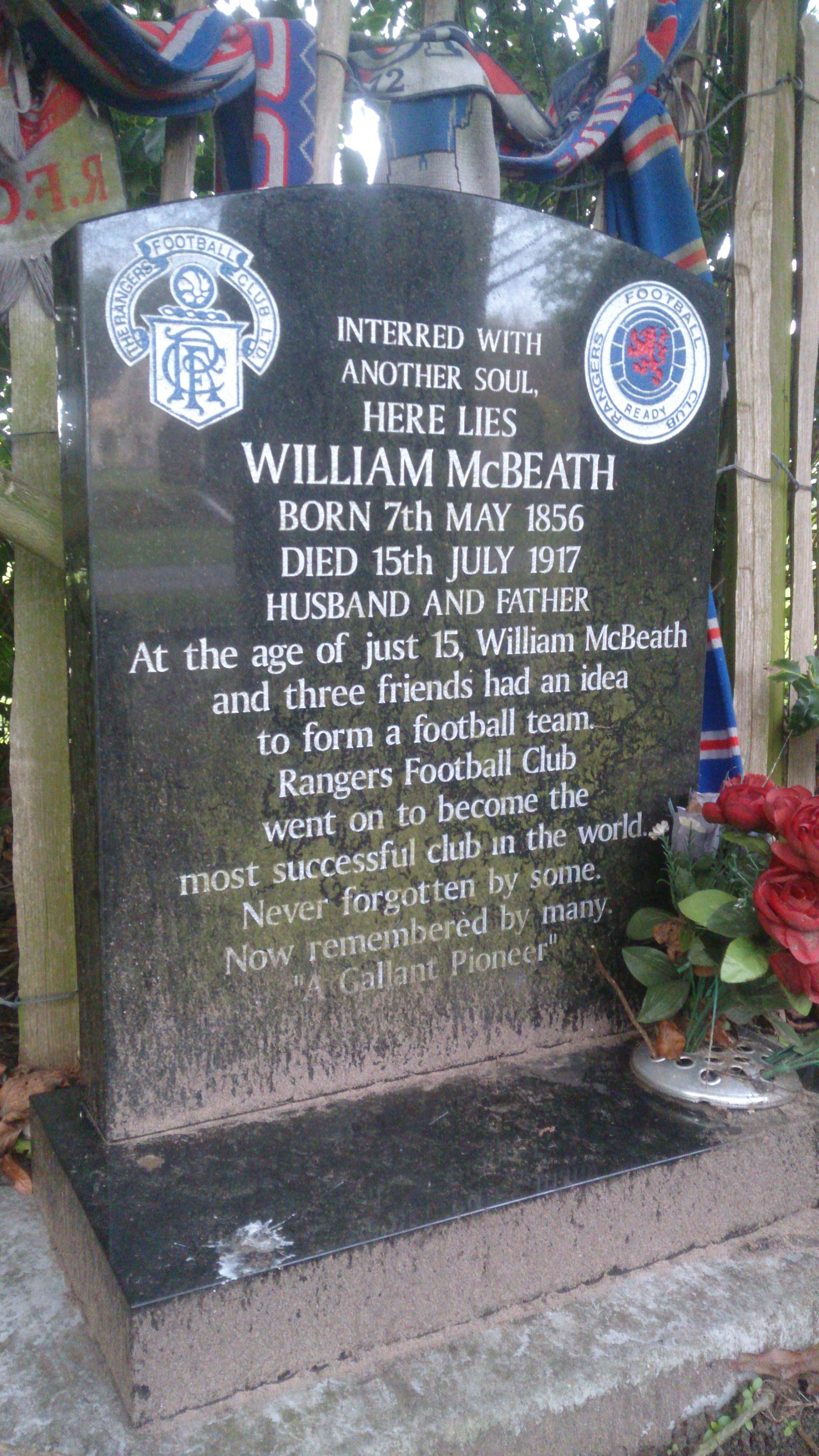
The headstone of William McBeath 1 May 2018

Willam McBeath's contribution to the creation of Rangers Football Club was not considered to be as celebrated or honoured as much as the other founding members of the club. His grave remained unmarked at the back end of a Lincolnshire cemetery until a Rangers fan placed a solitary Saltire and a simple plaque bearing the inscription: "In this place lies William McBeath who in 1872, Along with three friends, had an idea to start a football Team. That team became Rangers F.C."

In summer 2010, members of the Rangers supporters' internet forum Vanguardbears bought a 50-year lease on the grave, thanks to co-operative Lincoln City Council, and purchased and dedicated a gravestone to honour McBeath and his final resting place.

On 22 February 2010, William McBeath was inducted into the Rangers Hall Of Fame alongside Lorenzo Amoruso, Derek Parlane, Ian McMillan and George Brown.
