= Niall O'Gallagher =

Scottish political correspondent

Niall O'Gallagher (born 1981), along with Michael MacNeill, is the political correspondent (neach-naidheachd) for the BBC's An Là News programme. Before the launch of An Là, O'Gallagher worked on Radio nan Gaidheal's Aithris na Maidne and Aithris an Fheasgair, also on politics. O'Gallagher was the first correspondent to appear on the first night of An Là, from the Labour Party Conference in Manchester. He writes a political blog for the BBC Alba Naidheachdan website.

O'Gallagher is originally from Edinburgh and learnt Gaelic at Glasgow University, where he graduated with a first class MA(Hons) degree in English and Scottish Literature, and a PhD in English Literature on the work of the writer Alasdair Gray. He remains an Honorary Research Associate of the Glasgow University Celtic Department.

O'Gallagher also made a film for BBC2's Eòrpa on Slovak immigrants to Glasgow, and provides occasional commentary for First Minister's Questions on Holyrood Live.

O'Gallagher also writes poetry in Gaelic. O'Gallagher's debut collection, Beatha Ùr (A New Life), containing a group of ten sonnets on various subjects and a longer set of poems about Glasgow, was published by Scottish Gaelic publisher CLÀR in 2013. Beatha Ùr, with its Gaelic-only content, contradicts the 'culture of translation' recognised as being dominant within 20th and 21st Century Scottish Gaelic poetry publications.

In 2019 O'Gallagher was appointed Bàrd Baile Ghlaschu, or as the City of Glasgow's first ever Gaelic language poet laureate.
