= John Campbell (footballer, born 1850s) =

Scottish footballer

Personal information
- Position: Winger

Senior career*
Years	Team	Apps	(Gls)
1874–1875	Rangers		
- South Western

International career
1880	Scotland	1	(1)
- * Club domestic league appearances and goals

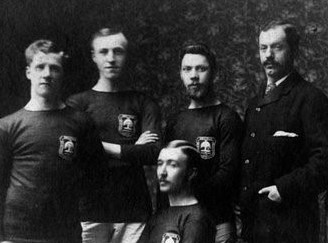
Campbell (standing 2nd left) with other members of the Glasgow select team in 1880

John Campbell was a Scottish footballer who played for South Western and Scotland. He also played for and was match secretary of Rangers.
