= Robert Parlane =

Scottish footballer

Personal information
- Date of birth: 5 January 1847
- Place of birth: Bonhill, Dunbartonshire, Scotland
- Date of death: 13 January 1918 (aged 71)
- Place of death: Belfast, Ireland
- Height: 6 ft 3 in (1.91 m)
- Position: Goalkeeper

Senior career*
Years	Team	Apps	(Gls)
- Vale of Leven

International career
1878–1879	Scotland	3	(0)
- * Club domestic league appearances and goals

Robert Parlane (5 January 1847 – 13 January 1918) was a Scottish footballer who played as a goalkeeper.

== Career ==
Born in the Vale of Leven in Dunbartonshire, Parlane played club football for Vale of Leven, and made three appearances for Scotland. He won the Scottish Cup three times in a row with Vale of Leven (1877–1879).

Parlane was also a cricketer for the Vale of Leven Cricket Club.
