= Queen's Park Juniors F.C. =

Association football club in Glasgow City, Scotland

Queen's Park Juniors
- Full name: Queen's Park Juniors Football Club
- Founded: 1870
- Dissolved: 1878
- Ground: Recreation Park
- Chairman: Mr Rae
- Secretary: H. Sinclair Jr
Home colours

Queen's Park Juniors Football Club was a 19th-century football club based in Glasgow.

== History ==
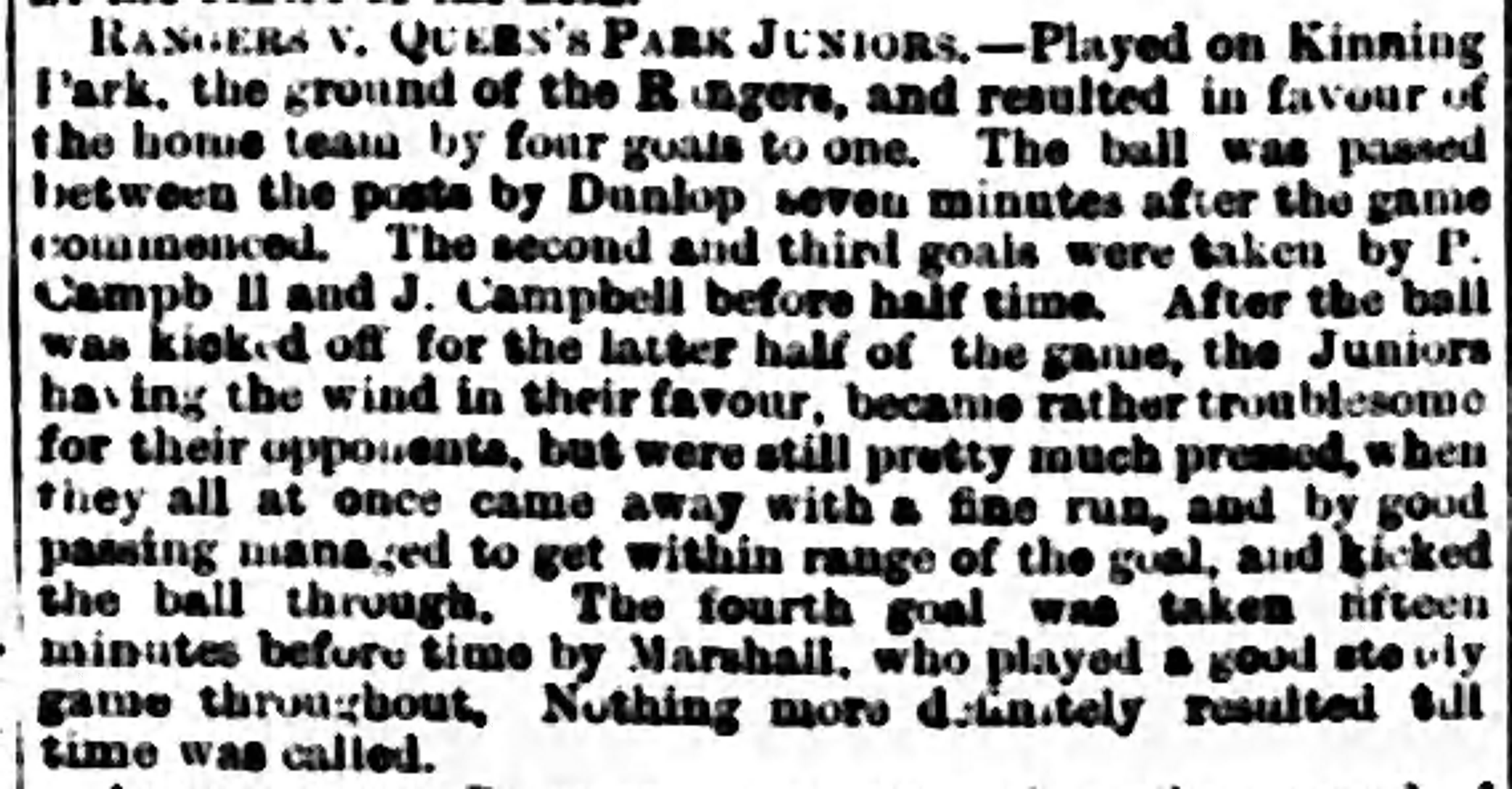
Match report, Rangers 4-1 Queen's Park Juniors, Scottish Cup first round, North British Daily Mail, 2 October 1876

Despite the club's name, it was never formally part of the Queen's Park F.C. organization; the reserve teams of Queen's Park were called the Strollers and the Hampden XI. However, there were close links, as the Juniors played on the former ground of Queen's Park, enjoyed free entry to matches, and often provided players to Queen's Park.

The club gave its foundation date as 1870, although the earliest recorded match was a goalless draw against the Woodbank club in September 1873.

The club entered the Scottish Cup on three occasions in the late 1870s, but never progressed beyond the first round. In 1875–76 the club scratched to Renton Thistle F.C., in 1876–77 the club lost 4–1 to eventual finalists Rangers, and in 1877–78 it lost to 1–0 away to Jordanhill. The club seems to have stopped playing matches against other teams soon afterwards, its last recorded fixtures being from November 1877.

== Colours ==
The club's colours were the same black and white jersey and hose as those of Queen's Park.

== Grounds ==
The club played at the Recreation Park in Queen's Park, near to Hampden Park, a 2-minute walk from the Crosshill tram terminus.

== Notable players ==
- George Ker, future Scottish international
- Stewart Lawrie, later President of Queen's Park
- Sgt Yates, winner of the Queen's Prize for rifle-shooting in 1898 and a forward with the club in 1875
