= Peter Campbell (Rangers footballer) =

Scottish footballer

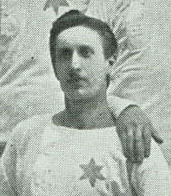

Personal information
- Full name: Peter Campbell
- Date of birth: 1850s
- Place of birth: Rhu, Argyll, Scotland
- Date of death: 28 January 1883
- Place of death: Bay of Biscay
- Position: Forward

Senior career*
Years	Team	Apps	(Gls)
1872–1879	Rangers		
1879–1880	Blackburn Rovers		

International career
1878–1879	Scotland	2	(3)
- * Club domestic league appearances and goals

Peter Campbell (late 1850s – January 1883) was a Scottish footballer, who was one of the four founding members of Rangers Football Club. He made 24 Scottish Cup appearances for Rangers and scored 15 goals.

== Club career ==
Along with fellow founding members Peter McNeil, Moses McNeil and William McBeath, Campbell played in Rangers' first ever match against Callander F.C. at Flesher's Haugh, Glasgow Green in 1872. He continued to play for Rangers until 1879, helping the club to the Scottish Cup finals of 1877 and 1879. He played briefly for English club Blackburn Rovers for the 1879–80 season before retiring from football.

On 22 February 2010, Peter Campbell was inducted into the Rangers Hall of Fame.

== International career ==
He also represented the Scotland national team, playing twice against Wales in 1878 and in 1879, scoring in both.

=== International goals ===
Scores and results list Scotland's goal tally first.

#	Date	Venue	Opponent	Score	Result	Competition
1	23 March 1878	Hampden Park, Glasgow	Wales	1–0	9–0	Friendly
2	23 March 1878	Hampden Park, Glasgow	Wales	3–0	9–0	Friendly
3	7 April 1879	Acton Park, Wrexham	Wales	1–0	3–0	Friendly

== Death ==
He died from drowning after his ship Saint Columba sank 28 January 1883 in the Bay of Biscay during a storm. as it ferried coal from south Wales to Bombay in 1883.
