= John McPherson (footballer, born 1855) =

Scottish footballer

John Campbell McLeod McPherson (born c. 1855; died 14 March 1934) was a Scottish footballer, who played for Vale of Leven and Scotland.

== See also ==
- List of Scotland national football team captains
