= Towerhill F.C. =

Association football club in Glasgow City, Scotland

Towerhill
- Full name: Towerhill Football Club
- Founded: 1874
- Dissolved: 1877
- Ground: Janefield Park
- Secretary: John Breeze, Allison A. Sim
- Captain: William Barclay
Home colours

Towerhill Football Club was a 19th-century football club based in the Springburn area of Glasgow.

== History ==
The club was founded in 1874, playing its first match - between club members - on 26 September. Its first season was not successful; the club won 1 of its first 17 matches, albeit it managed to draw 8.

Towerhill entered the Scottish Cup for the first time in 1875–76. In its first tie the club played Lancelot F.C. at home, and won 2–0, with a third goal disputed, the Towerhill goalkeeper only needing to make one save. In the second round the club lost 2–0 at Partick of Whiteinch. The club's season was more promising, with 10 wins out of 20 fixtures.

The club's second and last Cup entry came the following season. The club again won through the first round, with a 2–1 victory over Rovers, thanks to goals from Menzies and H. Johnson. In the second round, Towerhill lost 8–0 at home to Rangers F.C., only twice having shots at goal, albeit Towerhill was forced to play with ten men in the second half.

A Towerhill club is found playing in a four-a-side tournament at Alexandra Athletic F.C. in 1879, but this almost certainly refers to a different club, or perhaps four players of other clubs forming an ad-hoc team, as there is no other reference to Towerhill after 1877, the last recorded reference to the club being a defeat at home to Shawfield in March that year.

== Colours ==
The club wore blue and orange shirts in 2-inch "rings", white knickers, and blue and orange stockings, originally accompanied by a blue cowl.

== Grounds ==
The club originally played at Janefield Park in Springburn. For its second season, the club played at Mosesfield Park.
