= John McGregor (footballer, born 1851) =

Scottish footballer

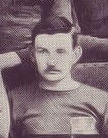
McGregor in 1877

John C. McGregor (born 1851) was a Scottish footballer, who played for Vale of Leven and Scotland. McGregor played four times for Scotland and scored one goal, in a 7–2 victory against England in 1878.
