= Andrew McIntyre =

Scottish footballer

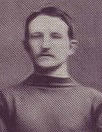
- McIntyre with Vale of Leven in 1877.

Personal information
- Date of birth: 9 August 1855
- Place of birth: Bonhill, Scotland
- Date of death: 30 March 1941 (aged 85)
- Position: Full back

Senior career*
Years	Team	Apps	(Gls)
- Vale of Leven

International career
1878–1882	Scotland	2	(0)
- * Club domestic league appearances and goals

Andrew McIntyre (9 August 1855 – 30 March 1941) was a Scottish footballer who played as a full back.

== Career ==
Born in Bonhill, McIntyre played club football for Vale of Leven and made two appearances for Scotland. With Vale of Leven he won the Scottish Cup on three occasions.
