= David Hill (Rangers footballer) =

Scottish footballer

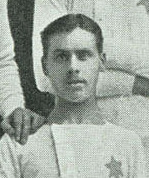
- Hill with Rangers in 1877.

Personal information
- Position: Winger

Senior career*
Years	Team	Apps	(Gls)
- Rangers

International career
1881–1882	Scotland	3	(0)
- * Club domestic league appearances and goals

David Hill was a Scottish footballer who played as a winger.

== Career ==
Hill played club football for Rangers, and made three appearances for Scotland. He had been a founder member of Rangers.
