= Alex McLintock =

Scottish footballer

Personal information
- Full name: Alexander McLintock
- Date of birth: 1853
- Place of birth: Alexandria, Scotland
- Date of death: 17 May 1931 (aged 77)
- Positions: Defender; goalkeeper

Senior career*
Years	Team	Apps	(Gls)
1874–1884	Vale of Leven		
1884–1885	Burnley		

International career
1875–1880	Scotland	3	(0)
- * Club domestic league appearances and goals

Alexander McLintock (1853 – 17 May 1931) was a Scottish international footballer who initially played as a defender, but was used as a goalkeeper in the latter stages of his career. He started his career with Vale of Leven and was a part of the side that won three successive Scottish Cup victories. He later played in England with Burnley.

== Personal life ==
McLintock was born in 1853 in Alexandria, West Dunbartonshire and during his early years he worked as a tinsmith. After his retirement from football in 1885, he owned a public house in Burnley before returning to Scotland to resume his original trade as a tinsmith. He died on 17 May 1931, aged 77.

== Club career ==
McLintock's senior football career started in his early twenties when he signed for Vale of Leven in 1874. He played for the club for the next ten years, regularly appearing for the first team at half-back and full-back. He was a part of the team that won three consecutive Scottish Cup titles, in 1877, 1878 and 1879. In the summer of 1884, he moved south to England to join Burnley. Upon his move to Turf Moor, McLintock was converted to a goalkeeper. When he started alongside Alf Jones in a friendly against a Blackburn Select XI on 23 February 1885, it was the first time that two international footballers had appeared in the same Burnley line-up. In the following match, a 4–4 draw with Preston North End, McLintock suffered a severe leg injury which prevented him from playing again for a considerable period of time. He continued to play for a short while after his recovery but the problem re-occurred, forcing him to retire from football in December 1885.

== International career ==
Thanks to his defensive performances for Vale of Leven, McLintock was called up to the Scotland national football team in 1875. He went on to play three matches for his country, all of them against England. His international debut came on 6 March 1875, when he played in the 2–2 draw at the Kennington Oval. He played his second match for Scotland the following year in a 3–0 win at Hamilton Crescent on 4 March 1876. It was another four years until he was included in the squad again, and his final match for Scotland came on 13 March 1880 in the 5–4 win over England at Hampden Park.
