= John Ferguson (footballer, born 1848) =

Scottish footballer

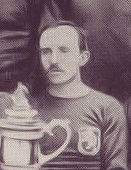
Ferguson in 1877

John Ferguson (22 June 1848 – 6 September 1929) was a Scottish footballer who played for Vale of Leven and the Scotland national team in the very early days of Scottish football in the 1870s.

Previously a noted shinty player and sprinter, Ferguson joined Vale of Leven in 1872. He played as a forward for their great team which won the Scottish Cup three times in 1877, 1878 and 1879. He played in all three cup finals, and was captain of the Vale team in the 1877 final. In 1878, after winning the final, they travelled down to England and beat Wanderers F.C., the FA Cup winners, 3–1. Although an important game in a way, the match was not advertised, and they had not decided beforehand whether to use the Scottish or English throw-in rule.

He played for Scotland six times (three times each against England and Wales) and scored a total of five goals.

In later years he ran a pub in Kilmarnock.
