= Peter McNeil (footballer) =

Scottish footballer (1854–1901)

Personal information
- Date of birth: 1854
- Place of birth: Rhu, Scotland
- Date of death: 30 March 1901 (aged 47)
- Place of death: Hawkhead, Scotland
- Position: Midfielder

Senior career*
Years	Team	Apps	(Gls)
1872–1877	Rangers		
- * Club domestic league appearances and goals

Peter McNeil (1854 – 30 March 1901) was a Scottish footballer and along with brother Moses, one of the founding members of Rangers Football Club. He made seven Scottish Cup appearances for the club.

== Life ==
He was born at Belmore House in Rhu in Dunbartonshire, the son of John McNeil and his wife, Jane Loudon Bain. His father was the gardener at Belmore House. Around 1870 the family moved to 17 Cleveland Street in Anderston.

Peter McNeil was apprenticed as a clerk in Anderston around 1871.

He played in Rangers first ever match in May 1872 against another Glasgow team, Callander F.C. on Fleshers Haugh, Glasgow Green.

After finishing playing football, he continued as match secretary and was hugely influential in the fledgling years of the Club. McNeil died in 1901 at the Hawkhead Asylum near Paisley aged 47. He was certified insane and had been sectioned. The pressures from financial problems had taken its toll on his mental and physical health.

He is buried in Craigton Cemetery in southwest Glasgow.

== Recognition ==
On 22 February 2010, Peter McNeil was inducted into the Rangers Hall of Fame.

== Family ==
In 1885, he married Jeannie Fraser. They lived at 31 Rawcliffe Terrace in Pollokshields. In 1888, they moved to 37 Bentinck Street in the Kelvingrove district.
