= John Campbell Baird =

Scottish footballer

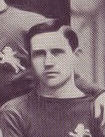
Baird in 1877

John Campbell Baird (27 July 1856 – 4 March 1902) was a Scottish footballer, who played for Vale of Leven and Scotland.
