= John McDougall (footballer, born 1853) =

Scottish footballer

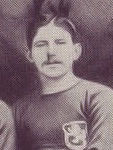
McDougall in 1877

John Smith McDougall (9 April 1854 – 16 May 1925) was a Scottish footballer, who played for Scotland between 1877 and 1879. During his international career he played five matches, scoring four goals. He was the first player to score a hat-trick in an international game, scoring three goals for Scotland against England in a 7–2 win on 2 March 1878. During his domestic career he played for Vale of Leven.

== International matches ==
| | Date | Against | Venue | Result (Scotland first) | Goals scored |
|---|---|---|---|---|---|
| 1 | 3 March 1877 | England | Kennington Oval | 3–1 | 0 |
| 2 | 5 March 1877 | Wales | Acton Park, Wrexham | 2–0 | 0 |
| 3 | 2 March 1878 | England | Hampden Park | 7–2 | 3 |
| 4 | 5 April 1879 | England | Kennington Oval | 4–5 | 1 |
| 5 | 7 April 1879 | Wales | Acton Park | 3–0 | 0 |

== See also ==
- List of Scotland national football team captains
- List of Scotland national football team hat-tricks
