= Vale of Leven F.C. =

Association football club in Scotland

Vale of Leven
- Full name: Vale of Leven Football & Athletic Club
- Nickname: The Vale
- Founded: 1872 (original club); 1939 (current club)
- Ground: Millburn Park, Alexandria
- Capacity: 3,000
- Coordinates: 55°58′53″N 4°34′40″W
- Chairman: Angus Wallace
- Manager: Brian Brown
- League: West of Scotland League Third Division
- 2025–26: West of Scotland League Fourth Division, 6th of 16 (promoted)
- Website: http://www.valeoflevenfc.co.uk/
Home colours

Vale of Leven Football Club is a Scottish football club based in the town of Alexandria, in the Vale of Leven area of West Dunbartonshire. Nicknamed "the Vale" and reformed in 1939, the club competes in West of Scotland League Third Division, the ninth tier of Scottish football, holding home games at Millburn Park.

== History ==
=== Original club ===
In the early days of Scottish football, Vale of Leven (based in Alexandria) and their neighbours Renton were real powers in the land, thanks to significant backing from local factories; Vale was backed by Archibald Orr-Ewing's dye works, which meant that Vale could recruit players as factory workers but allow them the time and facilities to play football.

One early controversy over this veiled professionalism came in the 1874–75 Scottish Cup. The club was drawn against Clydesdale F.C. in the first round; the Glaswegian club protested the presence in the Vale side of John Ferguson, who, as a former professional athlete, was barred from playing in the competition at the time, even though Ferguson was described as an amateur who "usually wrought in the Vale of Leven from year to year, and no objection was made to him in the international match"; the tie was played under protest, and, after a goalless draw, Vale withdrew rather than re-play.

The rule was changed for the next season and Vale promptly reached the semi-final, and then won the Cup three times in succession (1877, 1878 and 1879). In 1878 they travelled down to England and beat the FA Cup winners, The Wanderers, 3–1 at Kennington Oval. The Wanderers had the advantage that the game was played under the English throw-in rule, but the Vale's Scottish passing game proved superior to the English game of individual dribbling. The club also won the Glasgow Celtic Society Cup in shinty in 1879.

Vale of Leven was a founder member of the Scottish Football League when it was formed in 1890. By this time, the club was being eclipsed by the rising stars of well-supported clubs based in Glasgow, and local rivals Dumbarton. In their second season, they failed to win a single game and finished last, being the last senior Scottish club to suffer this ignominy until Brechin in 2018. Rather than face re-election for the second time, the club withdrew and joined the rival Scottish Alliance where they played for a single season.

Between 1893 and 1902, the Vale played only friendly matches and in cup competition before joining the Scottish Football Combination. In 1905, they applied successfully for readmission to the Scottish League when Division Two was expanded for two additional teams. They finished as runners-up in 1907 and in 1909, but did not receive the votes they needed to be elected to Division One. As the following decade wore on, Vale of Leven struggled and regularly finished near the foot of the table. When Division Two was suspended in 1915, Vale joined the Western League.

After World War I ended, Vale of Leven returned to the Scottish League for the third time as members of the reformed Division Two. After a decent fourth-place finish in their first season, the club was relegated to the new Division Three in 1924, but this ill-fated competition was shut down in 1926 and that year's championship withheld after it became clear that the costs of meeting match guarantees and travel and other expenses were beyond the capacity of its member clubs to pay.

After a season playing in the Scottish Alliance, financial constraints forced the club into a local district league before being discontinued in 1929, victims of the Great Depression which had proven so disastrous for many small Scottish football clubs at professional and amateur level. There was every intention of reviving the club once local economics made it viable; however, unlike previous occasions, they were struck off the SFA club roll after withdrawing from their Scottish Qualifying Cup match against Dykehead.

== Vale Ocoba ==
Vale Ocoba
- Full name: Vale of Leven Old Church Old Boys Association Football Club
- Nickname: The Vale
- Founded: 1930
- Dissolved: 1939
- Ground: Millburn Park
Home colours

In 1930, a new amateur side, Vale of Leven Old Church Old Boys Association (usually known as "Vale Ocoba"), was founded, and joined the West of Scotland Football Association to take part in amateur competition, playing at Millburn Park.

Vale Ocoba took part in the Scottish Cup from 1931 until 1938, and enjoyed success in first the West of Scotland Amateur League and then the Scottish Combinations. The club won through the Scottish Qualifying Cup to the Scottish Cup proper every season from 1934 to 1937, although the club never won through into the second round proper.

The club's best run in the Qualifying Cup was in 1936–37, winning the North section, beating Keith F.C. in a second replay, at Boghead Park, after two draws at Borough Briggs. In the first round of the Cup proper, the club lost against 8–0 against Clyde F.C., in front of 4,500 spectators, holding out for 18 minutes before conceding a penalty, and going in at half-time 2–0 down; the club blamed a lack of fitness for the eventual scoreline.

The club also won the Dumbartonshire Cup twice, but from 1931 to 1937 there were only two eligible entrants - Dumbarton F.C. and the Vale - so each tie was, in effect, a final. By beating the League club in 1933–34 and 1934–35, the Vale became Dumbartonshire champions.

The club played in the final incarnation of the Scottish Football Combination, finishing mid-table in the first revived season of 1935–36, but the Combination did not finish its second season.

=== Notable players ===
The most notable Ocoba player was Johnny Granger, formerly of Celtic, who was re-instated as an amateur player in 1931 so he could sign for Ocoba.

== Revival of Vale of Leven ==
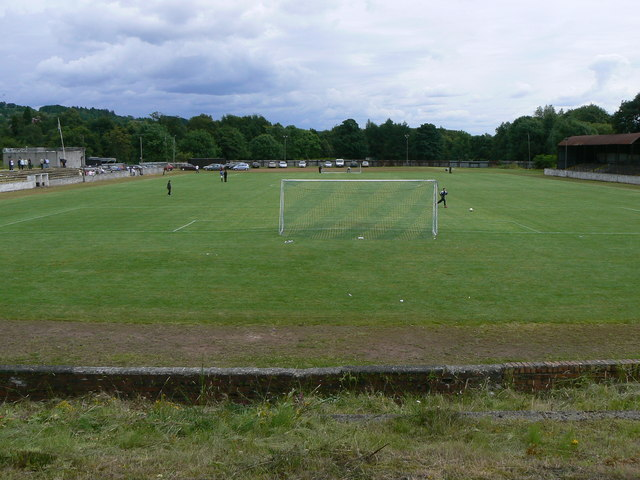
Milburn Park

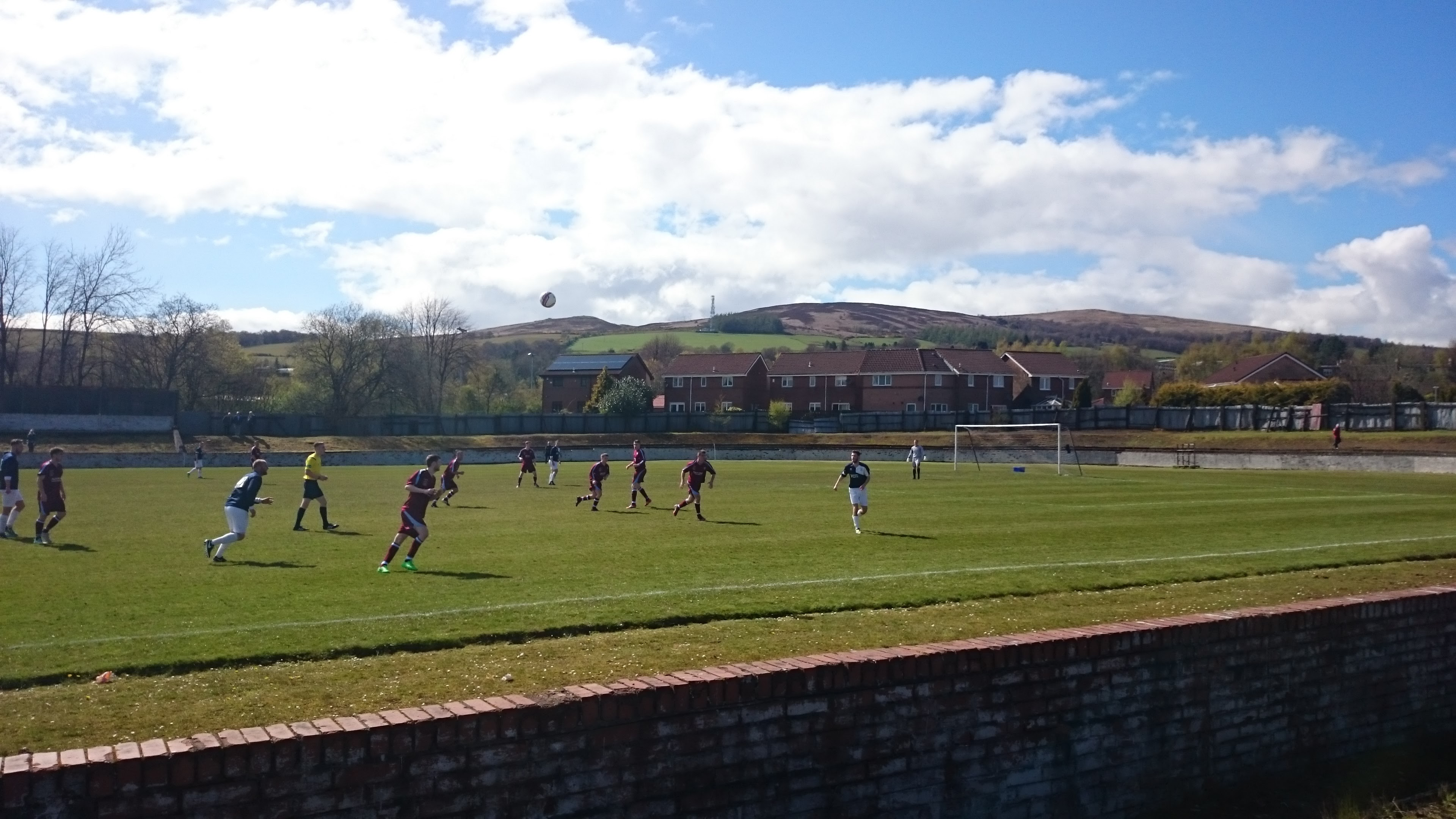
Millburn Park

Vale Ocoba was invited to be part of a reconstituted Scottish Football Alliance, along with Babcock & Wilcox (a works team), fellow former Scottish League and Alliance member Galston, Girvan Athletic, another former Scottish League member Nithsdale Wanderers, Queen's Park Strollers (Queen's Park third team), and Stranraer, which they duly did, but having changed name to Vale of Leven Football & Athletic Club.

Disaster struck however when the start of World War II obliged the league to be suspended due to restrictions on travel by December 1939. In order to survive, Vale Of Leven promptly joined the ranks of the Scottish Junior Football Association - suffering an abrupt vacancy in their Central League due to the bankruptcy of Springfield Athletic - and thus bringing to a final end 67 years of membership of the Scottish Football Association the club had helped to create. The first junior match was against Vale of Clyde F.C. at Milburn Park in 1940 and the Vale's proudest junior moment was winning the Scottish Junior Cup in 1953.

In 2020 Vale, along with other members of the Scottish Junior Football Association, West Region moved back into senior football - as members of the newly formed West of Scotland Football League.

== Colours ==
The club's original colours were red and blue. By 1875–76 the club was wearing dark blue, with red stockings. The club changed to all dark blue in 1900, and in 1912 changed its shorts to white, which remained the club's scheme, with a red V in 1915–16.

The club wore white on two notable occasions because of colour clashes - in the 1877 Scottish Cup final and the 1887–88 Dumbartonshire Cup final, as Renton also wore dark blue, so the Vale was ordered to wear the white jerseys of the Dumbartonshire Association.

The Vale Ocoba side wore black and white hooped shirts.

== Grounds ==
The club originally played at North Street Park. In 1888, the club created a new ground at Millburn Park, the ceremonial cutting of the sod taking place on 28 June 1888.

== Notable former players ==
15 Vale of Leven players were chosen to represent Scotland between 1879 and 1890. The club's international players were as follows:

- John Baird
- Daniel Bruce
- John Ferguson
- John Forbes
- John McDougall
- John McGregor
- Andrew McIntyre
- Alex McLintock
- John McPherson
- John Murray
- Robert Parlane
- Robert Paton
- Gilbert Rankin
- Andrew Whitelaw
- James Wilson

Former professionals that played for the modern club include:

- Danny O'Donnell
- Drew Busby
- Columb McKinley
- Bob McNicol
- Evan Williams

== Honours ==
=== Senior ===
- Scottish Cup
  - Winners (3): 1876-1877, 1877-1878, 1878-1879
  - Runners-up (4): 1882-1883, 1883-1884, 1884-1885, 1889-1890
- Scottish Qualifying Cup
  - Winners (2): 1909, 1937
- Glasgow Merchants Charity Cup
  - Winners (1): 1882
- Dumbartonshire Cup
  - Winners (11)

=== Junior ===
- Scottish Junior Cup
  - Winners (1): 1952-1953
- Central Junior Football League
  - A Division winners (1): 1946–1947
  - B Division winners / overall champions (1): 1969–1970
  - C Division winners (1): 1978–1979
  - Central District Third Division Winners (1): 2007–2008
- Evening Times Cup Winners Cup
  - Winners (2): 1947, 1970
- Kirkwood Shield
  - Winners (4): 1951, 1954, 1958, 1965
- Dunbartonshire Junior Cup
  - Winners (2): 1940, 1965
- Dunbartonshire Junior Charity Cup
  - Winners (5): 1943, 1946, 1947, 1953, 1954
- Erskine Hospital Charity Cup
  - Winners (1): 1970

=== Shinty ===
- Celtic Society Cup (shinty)
  - Winners (1): 1879
